= Kat Chapman =

Fictional character

- Home and Away character
- Portrayed by: Pia Miller
- Duration: 2015–2018
- First appearance: 5 February 2015
- Last appearance: 29 January 2018
- Introduced by: Lucy Addario
- Spin-off appearances: Home and Away: An Eye for an Eye (2015)
In-universe information
- Occupation: Senior Constable; Co-owner of Summer Bay Auto
- Mother: Devera Chapman
- Brothers: Leo Chapman; Paulo Chapman

Katarina Chapman is a fictional character from the Australian soap opera Home and Away, played by Pia Miller. The actress joined the cast in July 2014 following a successful audition. She began filming during the following month, and initially commuted from her home in Melbourne to the set in Sydney. Home and Away marked Miller's first major acting role. She made her first appearance during the episode broadcast on 5 February 2015. The actress was drawn to the part after reading that her character was a strong and resilient policewoman, who was not sexualised in any way. Miller wanted viewers to focus on Kat and not her appearance. The actress filmed her final scenes in August 2017 and Kat was killed off in the season finale, broadcast on 18 December 2017.

Kat's first storylines saw her interact with Darryl Braxton (Stephen Peacocke) as she investigated him for murder. She forms a relationship with local doctor Nate Cooper (Kyle Pryor), which is tested a number of times. Kat has survived falling over a cliff face and being shot. Towards the end of 2015, she was targeted by villain Charlotte King (Erika Heynatz). The character's background was explored further with the introduction of her abusive former fiancé Dylan Carter (Jeremy Lindsay Taylor), who arrived in the Bay to lead the investigation into Charlotte's murder. Following Dylan's departure, Kat began a relationship with Martin "Ash" Ashford (George Mason). She also faced problems in her career and briefly resigned from the police force. Miller earned a nomination for the Logie Award for Best New Talent for her portrayal of Kat.

== Casting ==
On 4 August 2014, Luke Dennehy of the Herald Sun reported actress and model Pia Miller had joined the regular cast of Home and Away as Katarina. Miller said joining the show had been "such a whirlwind". She auditioned for the role in July, two weeks before the casting announcement, and began filming her first scenes on 5 August. She initially commuted from her home in Melbourne to Sydney, where the show's studios are based. She later relocated to the city to be closer to the set. Home and Away marked Miller's first major acting role. She made her debut as Kat on 5 February 2015. Miller marked two years on the show in 2017. She stated "To get a job like this that is consistent, and I have a character I can really work in all those nuances and little things about her that I can relate to and make up and put my own touch on. It is just so much fun to have a character I can sink my teeth into."

== Development ==
=== Characterisation and introduction ===
She's tough, resilient and dedicated to her job. Acutely analytical as well as fit and active, she has an easy, laid-back charm. But dig a little deeper and you'll find how reluctant she is to trust people. She's been burned before.

— An excerpt from Kat's profile on the official Home and Away website.

Ahead of her introduction, Jonathon Moran of The Daily Telegraph described Kat as "a tough and resilient police officer driven by success in her work life." Miller explained that Kat is dedicated to her career, but she feels that "she has a lot to prove to others and to herself." Miller also said Kat displayed a "laid back charm" on the surface, but she was "her own harshest critic." In an interview published on the official website, Miller said she shared some similarities with the character. Both she and Kat were "straight down the line" people. Series producer Lucy Addario said it would not be immediately clear why Kat has moved to the Bay, and that she would have "a darker story behind her." As she settles into the Bay, Kat's walls begin to come down.

Miller wanted viewers to focus on the character and not her looks, commenting "Katarina is quite removed from being the 'hot chick' that comes into town." Miller was drawn to the role when she saw the character breakdown, as Kat was not sexualised at all. She comes to Summer Bay to do her job as a policewoman and help people. Miller continued, "She is probably the coolest chick ever! I'm proud to get to play her. She is a strong woman, a city girl, and she's been through a bit and had experiences – some good and some not so great. She came to Summer Bay with the idea of putting her head down and getting back to the city." Some critics and fans pointed out that Kat resembled former character Charlie Buckton (Esther Anderson). Miller replied that although Kat and Charlie were both women and were in the police force, they were two different characters.

Kat's introductory storyline saw her assigned to the investigation into Dean Sanderson's (Kevin Kiernan-Molly) death. Evidence leads the police to Darryl Braxton (Stephen Peacocke). Even though Kat is from the city, she has heard all about the reputation of the Braxton family. As she investigates the case, she feels empathy and sympathy for them. Miller explained that the human aspect of Kat comes into play during the story, and she is also battling against her professionalism. She continued by saying the "cop/Braxton relationship" does gets tested. Brax's friend Martin "Ash" Ashford (George Mason) confronts Kat with a theory that Dean was murdered by Sam Kennedy (Wade Briggs). Kat is "less than enthusiastic" about Ash's hunch, and will not listen to his theory, unless he can produce some evidence to back it up. She also reminds Ash that the police have already looked into Sam and dismissed him as a suspect, since he has no criminal history or connection to the murder.

=== Relationship with Nate Cooper ===
When asked if there was any romance ahead for Kat, Miller said Kat was "not immune to the Summer Bay romance", but it was not high on her agenda after her arrival. A few weeks later Kat befriends local doctor Nate Cooper (Kyle Pryor), who is ready to move on from his failed marriage to Sophie Taylor (Bridgette Sneddon). Pryor said Nate is attracted to Kat's cheeky personality, and thinks he can "press her buttons." Kat agrees to go on a date with Nate, and she takes the opportunity to learn more about his former relationship with Bay resident Ricky Sharpe (Bonnie Sveen). Following their date, Kat and Nate spend the night together at his place. Pryor commented that Kat and Nate had a lot in common, and there was an undeniable spark between them. Believing that they are forming a connection, Nate is left disappointed when Kat leaves early the following morning. When they later catch up, Kat explains that she just wants to keep their relationship casual and a secret. Pryor said Nate was a little confused as to why Kat did not want people knowing about them, because they are both adults and should not be ashamed. Nate goes along with Kat's wishes, but when she realises that people are already gossiping about them, she breaks up with him.

Kat later challenges Nate to race her in a Color Run, and agrees to meet Chris Harrington (Johnny Ruffo) for a coffee, after he asks her to prove that nothing is going on between her and Nate. Miller commented that Kat has fun with Chris, while Stephen Downie of TV Week pointed out that she has more in common with Nate. Miller also said that Kat and Nate's relationship is full of "cheekiness" and they bring out a competitive streak in each other. In June 2015, series producer Lucy Addario revealed that Kat would eventually open up to Nate about her past and her history would explain why she acts the way she does. Addario also revealed that Billie Ashford's (Tessa de Josselin) crush on Nate would test his relationship with Kat. The storyline began to play out that same month as Kat and Nate rescue Billie from drowning in the sea. Nate administers mouth-to-mouth resuscitation to get Billie breathing again, and as he assures her that she will be okay, Billie begins to develop her crush. Billie tries to break up Kat and Nate's relationship, but when her plans fail, she accuses him of sexually assaulting her. Nate is questioned by Kat's Sergeant, Mike Emerson (Cameron Stewart), who produces evidence of a sexually explicit text sent from Nate's phone to Billie.

Kat initially wants to support Nate and believes Billie is lying, but she also has a duty as a police officer to take such accusations seriously. When she learns of the text message, Kat lets go of Nate's hand and he realises that she doubts his innocence. Kat then opens up to him about her "troubled past" and why she briefly doubted him. Kat and Nate plead Nate's innocence to Chris and ask him to help catch Billie out. When Chris discovers that Billie is behind an embarrassing poster that threatened to ruin Kat's career, he agrees to help. Chris invites Billie over to his house and tries to get her to confess to setting Nate up, by explaining that he wants to see Nate punished. Billie notices that Chris is recording the conversation and she switches his phone off, while claiming that she did frame Nate. Chris then reveals that he is actually wearing a police wire and Billie is arrested by Emerson. Nate and Kat's relationship becomes strained and they decide to take some time apart. Nate grows closer to Ricky again during that time. When he and Kat resume their relationship, they continue to have problems due to Kat's lack of trust in him.

Kat struggles when she learns Nate had sex with Ricky, and when Nate finds out how upset she is, he tries to apologise. Pryor commented, "He hated what he did to Kat. So, while there's a pull towards Ricky, he tries to man up and stick by their relationship." Kat refuses to accept his apology and she later sees him talking to Ricky, leaving her "confused and humiliated." Kat tells Nate that she is prepared to forgive him if he commits to their relationship, and he agrees. Pryor said Nate wants to do the right thing by Kat, as he knows she has been having a hard time, just like Ricky. Kat later notices Ricky staring at Nate and becomes suspicious of the pair once again. Kat and Nate's relationship ends for good, and Nate reunites with Ricky. Pryor told TV Week's Gavin Scott, "He's worried about telling Kat. He doesn't want to hurt her, considering everything she's been through. He will always care for her. However, he knows what is best for both of them, and that's being apart."

=== Cliff fall and shooting ===
Billie is later accused of arson and becomes depressed when her brother Ash doubts her innocence. Nate grows concerned for her mental and physical health when she goes missing from the hospital. He contacts Kat, who realises Billie is close to breaching her bail conditions, and she and Ash start a search for Billie. However, they fail to locate her and have to call the search off for the night. The following day, Kat receives a call about a sighting of a young woman near the lighthouse on the headland. Worried that Billie could jump any minute, Kat gently tries to coax her away from the edge. Billie continues to stare out to sea, until she is startled by Kat's radio and fearing that she is about to be arrested, she moves closer to the edge of the cliff. Kat lunges towards her to pull her back, but Billie steps to the side at the last minute, causing Kat to go over the edge of the cliff instead. She manages to grab hold of the ledge and calls Billie to help her. Billie eventually manages to pull Kat back over.

In early August 2015, Stephen Downie of TV Week reported that a character would be shot in an upcoming siege storyline and left fighting for their life. Kat was named as one of four potential victims, along with Josh Barrett (Jackson Gallagher), Evelyn MacGuire (Philippa Northeast), and Marilyn Chambers (Emily Symons). The storyline begins with Kat investing local drug dealer Damo Adams (Josh Anderson), after receiving a tip off from Josh Barrett. Kat and her colleagues raid Damo's dorm room and find his stash of drugs and money. Damo finds Josh at his home and uses a cricket bat to smash various objects, scaring Josh. Marilyn sees what is happening through the window and contacts the police. Josh is trying to talk Damo around when Kat enters the house, but Damo pulls Josh into a headlock. Kat tries to coax him into dropping the bat by putting her gun down on a table. When Damo hears police sirens outside, he lunges for the gun and Kat is shot. She is rushed to the hospital where Nate watches on as she is treated.

=== Charlotte King ===
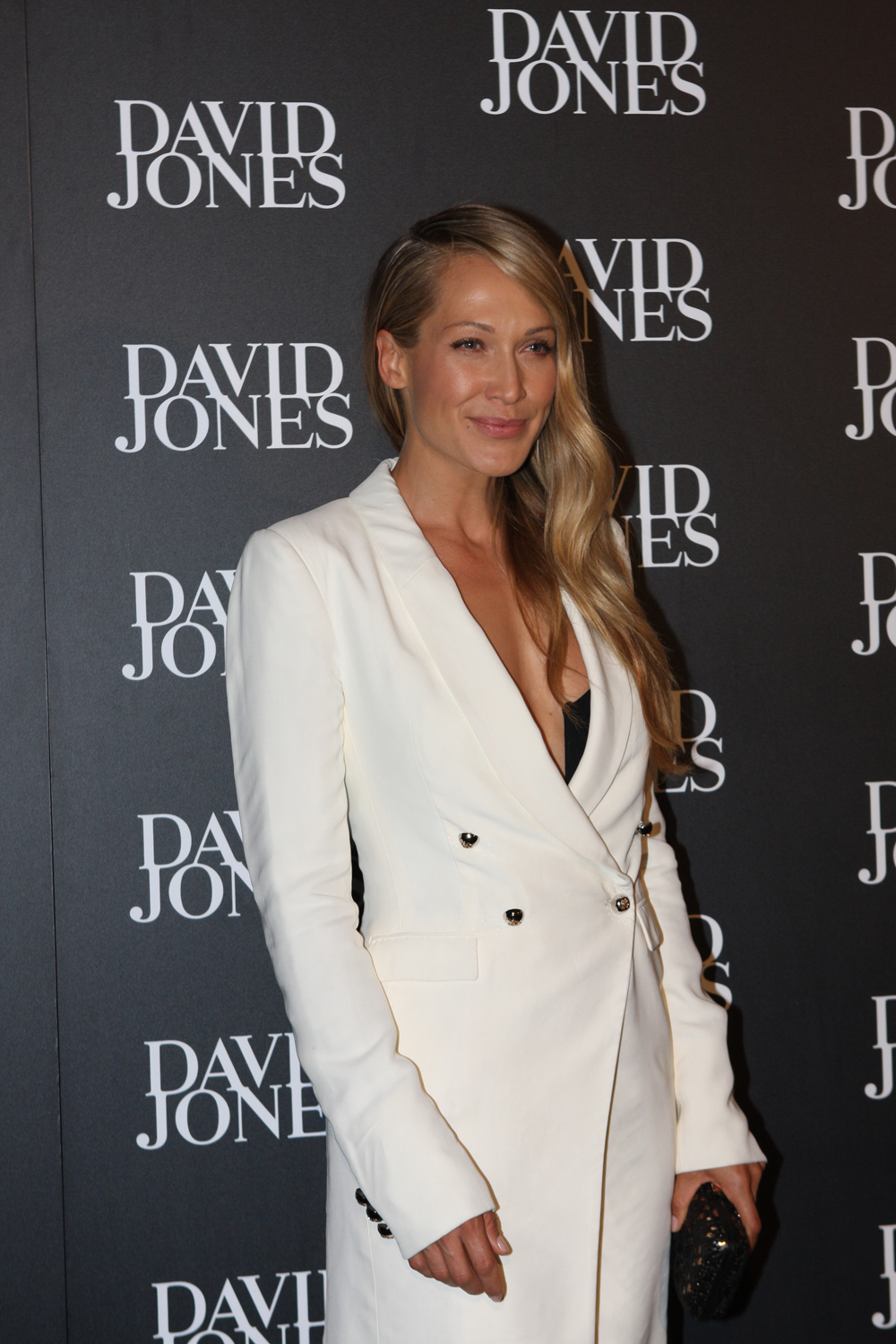
Kat was targeted by Charlotte King, played by Erika Heynatz (pictured), before she began investigating her murder in 2016.

Towards the end of 2015, Kat is targeted by villain Charlotte King (Erika Heynatz). The storyline began with Kat questioning Charlotte about her involvement with Trystan Powell (Ben Mingay), who has been attacked. Days later, Kat finds Charlotte's son Hunter (Scott Lee) by the roadside, after he has been kidnapped and drugged on Trystan's orders. Charlotte later strikes Trystan with her car and tells Kat that he stepped out in front of her. However, when Nate informs Kat that Trystan's injuries are not consistent with Charlotte's story, Kat remembers Trystan had been harassing Charlotte, raising her suspicions. After Trystan dies from his injuries, Kat knows that Charlotte has not been honest with her.

Kat makes it clear that she knows Charlotte deliberately ran Trystan down and will prove it. Charlotte retaliates by spiking Kat's drink at Angelo's, while Kat is in the bathroom. The drug leaves Kat feeling groggy and unsteady. She staggers outside and collapses to the ground, while Charlotte watches on. Kat comes to in her patrol car and realises her gun and handcuffs have been taken. Kat catches the attention of Kyle Braxton (Nic Westaway), before falling unconscious again. Kyle gets Kat to the hospital, where she insists that her blood is checked for drugs. However, the test comes back clear and instead shows that she has a large amount of alcohol in her system. Kat insists that she has been set up, while Kyle also suspects Charlotte is behind the attack.

Kat is suspended for having alcohol in her system while on duty, but she continues to investigate Charlotte. Miller commented, "She starts investigating and she becomes relentless." Kat accesses Charlotte's apartment and finds a travel itinerary for her friend Denny Miller (Jessica Grace Smith), who left the Bay. Kat confronts Charlotte about Denny's connection to Trystan, but Charlotte "coolly pleads her ignorance", leaving Kat to suspect that Charlotte has something to do with Denny. Desperate not to get caught, Charlotte targets Kat again. While Kat is searching through Denny's belongings at the Farmhouse, she is hit from behind by two men and left next to the oven with the gas on. As Kat lies unconscious on the floor, Charlotte receives a message letting her know her problem has been dealt with. Martin Ashford turns up at the Farmhouse and immediately turns the gas off and opens a window. He manages to wake Kat, who later tells Sergeant Emerson that Charlotte organised her attack.

In November 2015, it was announced that either Kat, Charlotte, Hunter or Ash would be shot and killed off during the series finale on 9 December. During the episode, Kat found the evidence she needed to link Charlotte to Denny's death, and then informed Denny's family that Charlotte was responsible. Shortly after, Charlotte was shot at the pier by an unseen culprit, who she knew. Her death sparked a "whodunit" storyline, involving ten suspects. After a few months, the investigation is wound down. However, Kat is still determined to find Charlotte's killer. Miller told Downie (TV Week) "In the back of her mind, Kat feels it's her obligation as a resident of Summer Bay." As she is going through the evidence, Kat makes a discovery that links one of the residents to the murder. Kat arranges to meet the killer at the pier, where Charlotte was shot. Miller said that Kat feels the location will help with her interrogation. The actress added, "She is 100 per cent ready for this confrontation. It's the moment she's been waiting for." In a 90-minute episode broadcast on 5 May 2016, Charlotte's killer was revealed to be Josh Barrett. Kat chooses not to arrest Josh straight away, as his girlfriend Evelyn is grieving the deaths of her brother and aunt, and needs Josh for support.

=== Dylan Carter ===
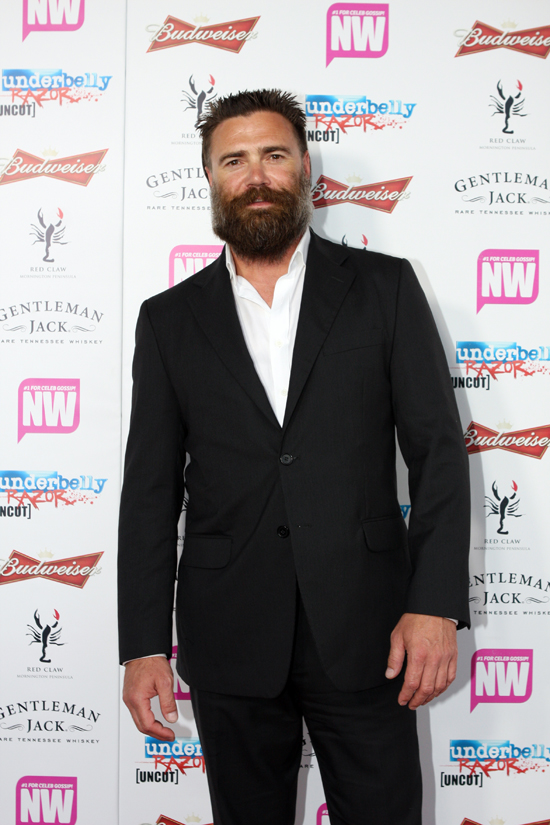
Actor Jeremy Lindsay Taylor (pictured) joined the cast as Kat's former fiancé Dylan Carter in early 2016.

In early 2016, Detective Dylan Carter (Jeremy Lindsay Taylor) was introduced to the show. A reporter for The Daily Telegraph said he would be mainly interacting with Kat. Dylan comes to the Bay to lead the investigation into Charlotte's murder. It also emerges that he and Kat used to be engaged, but their relationship ended when he mentally and physically abused her. Of their relationship, Lindsay Taylor stated "One of the problems when they were engaged was that Kat has a lot of male friends and he can't deal with that really because of his own insecurities. It's up to him to prove himself, to prove that he has changed." Taylor found the subject of domestic violence tough to explore. He also said that Dylan wants Kat back and lets her know straight away, leaving her to wonder if he took the job to be near her. The actor commented, "He's still deeply in love with her and can't let her go." Kat turns down his invitation to dinner and reminds him of how he used to hit her. During the course of the investigation, Kat and Dylan get back together, which concerns her friends.

After Dylan questions Ash about Charlotte, Ash starts to have doubts about the detective. He realises that Dylan is jealous of his friendship with Kat, and that he ordered Ash's garage to be trashed. Kat also starts to see that Dylan is not the changed man he is pretending to be. Mason pointed out that Kat had "fallen under his spell and thought he'd changed his ways. She tried to forget the past." Kat and Ash soon discover that Dylan paid an ex-con to trash the garage, and that he blackmailed the judge in Zac MacGuire's (Charlie Clausen) trial for Charlotte's murder. Kat tells Dylan that their relationship is over, but an "enraged" Dylan hits Kat, throws her on the bed and tells her the relationship is not done until he says so. Kat then exposes Dylan's blackmail and he is suspended from the force. Kat believes Dylan has left the Bay, unaware that he is hiding in the bushes outside her home. When he sees that Kat is alone, Dylan begs her to reconsider ending their relationship. When he goes to grab her, Kat pushes him to the ground, leaving him in a heap on the floor. Ash then turns up and comforts Kat.

=== Relationship with Martin Ashford ===
Kat and Ash develop feeling for each other and share several kisses. They agree that they cannot start a relationship until they speak with Ash's former partner and Kat's friend, Phoebe Nicholson (Isabella Giovinazzo). Kat and Ash arrange to have dinner with Phoebe, so they can tell her that they are together, but she cancels. Kat and Ash then give into their feelings and Phoebe walks in on them kissing. Phoebe "reluctantly" gives Kat and Ash's relationship her blessing, but feels somewhat betrayed by them. Ash later organises a dinner for himself, Kat, Phoebe and her partner Dom Loneragan (Lindsay Farris). Both Kat and Phoebe are hesitant, but Ash assures them that they need to face what has happened. Kat later ends her relationship with Ash after learning that he knew about car rebirthing at the garage, despite Ash insisting that he will change.

Kat resumes her relationship with Ash a couple of months later, risking her career as her sergeant has warned her against reuniting with him. Kat becomes closer to Ash when she learns he gave drugs to Caroline Stewart (Nicole Shostak). She is initially "furious" with him, but he soon explains that Caroline has Huntington's disease and he could not watch her suffer. Kat realises that she still has strong feelings for Ash and they get back together. However, Kat tells Ash that they have to keep their relationship a secret until she is no longer on probation at work. Kat and Ash's relationship is tested when he wins custody of his young niece Luc Patterson. Kat begins working longer hours in order to bring down a drug dealer and gain a promotion, forcing Ash to care for Luc on his own. Ash calls Kat for help when he cannot settle Luc, but Kat refuses to return to their apartment. Ash makes it known that he feels Kat is putting her work before Luc, and he is "livid" when Kat mentions that she will miss Luc's four-month check-up because she has to work.

Kat and Ash eventually decide to end their relationship, after it becomes strained due to her long work hours and lack of commitment to Ash and Luc. Mason commented that it was "a tough situation" for them both. Ash expects Kat to step up because she loves him, but she does not. When Ash tells Kat that he wants them to adopt Luc, she refuses as she does not want to be a mother and Ash realises their relationship is over. Mason continued, "Ash can't blame Kat for feeling that way, but it hurts him. He'll do whatever is best for Luc." Kat leaves their home and Ash turns to their mutual friend Tori Morgan (Penny McNamee) for support.

=== Career problems ===
Executive producer Lucy Addario wanted to explore how Kat would cope without "the armour of her police uniform" and implemented a story arc in which she resigns from the police force. Miller was told that she would not be wearing make-up for the storyline, although dark circles were added under her eyes. She felt both vulnerable and liberated by the experience, and found it was easier to focus on Kat's pain. On-screen, Kat discovers that Ash knew Andy Barrett (Tai Hara) was rebirthing cars at the garage. When Ash asks her to keep quiet, they argue. Kat starts to feel increasingly guilty that she has abused her position, and following another argument with Ash, she walks off. Ash believes Kat has gone to tell Sergeant Phillip McCarthy (Nicholas Cassim) about the cover up, but instead Kat resigns. Ash finds Kat on the beach, where she has a panic attack. Mason told Ali Cromarty from TV Week that Ash is worried about her state of mind and did not realise how much the cover up was affecting her.

Phoebe persuades Brody Morgan (Jackson Heywood) to give Kat a waitressing job at his restaurant Salt. During Kat's first shift, Ash walks in and expresses his surprise that she has taken a job there. Later that day, Sergeant McCarthy and some of Kat's former colleagues turn up to dine there, embarrassing her. However, Kat continues to work. Nearing the end of her shift, Kat is approached by a customer, Jeremy Glanville (Adam Franklin), who asks her to have a drink with him. Jeremy's bad behaviour grows worse when Phoebe asks him to leave, and he pinches her bottom. He then attempts to grab Kat, who "instinctively" twists his arm behind his back and slams him into the counter. Jeremy soon goes, but the incident leaves both Kat and Phoebe shaken. McCarthy returns to the restaurant to inform Kat that Jeremy has made a complaint, and he places her under arrest for assault. Kat later rejoins the police force on probation. Addario was proud of Miller's performance during the arc, while the actress called it "one of the best storylines I've ever done."

=== Departure ===
In August 2017, news outlets published photos of the cast filming Kat's funeral. Daniel Kilkelly of Digital Spy confirmed that Kat's death would take place during the 2017 season finale. Miller's final scenes as Kat aired on 18 December, with Kat and her unborn child dying after being involved in a car accident. Miller described her last day as "super emotional", and said that it was hard knowing she would not be returning to the set the following week. Of leaving the show, she stated "It feels quite surreal. It was a huge part of my life for three years and I am so proud to have been a part of Home And Away. It has provided me with a really solid foundation and so many skills."

== Reception ==
For her portrayal of Kat, Miller received a nomination for the Logie Award for Best New Talent in 2016. Ahead of Kat's introduction, Stephen Downie of TV Week commented, "The people of Summer Bay won't want to mess with this tough chick." Of Kat and Nate, Tess Lamacraft of the South Wales Echo observed "the smitten pair can't keep their hands off each other". Helen Vnuk of TV Week included Kat in her feature on soap heroes. She stated that Kat "put her life on the line" during the hostage situation with Josh and Damo. Holly Byrnes, writing for news.com.au, branded Kat "resilient" and a "Summer Bay siren". After Ash was granted custody of Luc, a Sunday Mail reporter noted "it's clear Kat is unhappy".

Sophie Dainty of Digital Spy included Miller in her feature about people who reinvented themselves by appearing in a soap. Dainty praised Miller for successfully moving away from her sex symbol image. Dainty stated, "Policewoman Kat Chapman is strong, intelligent and about to crack Charlotte's murder, throwing any model stereotypes well and truly out the window."
