= Hannah Wilson (Home and Away) =

- Home and Away character
- Portrayed by: Cassie Howarth
- Duration: 2013–2016
- First appearance: 29 August 2013
- Last appearance: 5 May 2016
- Introduced by: Lucy Addario
In-universe information
- Occupation: Nurse
- Sisters: Sarah Wilson
- Nephews: Oscar MacGuire
- Nieces: Evelyn MacGuire

Hannah Wilson is a fictional character from the Australian soap opera, Home and Away, played by Cassie Howarth. The character made her first screen appearance on 29 August 2013. She was introduced as part of established character Zac MacGuire's (Charlie Clausen) extended family. Hannah is characterised as a "strong and determined" and very family orientated. She arrives in Summer Bay with newfound responsibility of looking after her dead sister's children Oscar (Jake Speer) and Evelyn MacGuire (Philippa Northeast). She takes a job at the local hospital as a nurse. Her early storylines focused mainly on the MacGuire family and Hannah shared a brief relationship with brother-in-law Zac. Producers created a new partnership between Hannah and Andy Barrett (Tai Hara). The latter being a self-destructive character, their relationship is short-lived following the revelation that he is a drug dealer.

Writers continued to involve Hannah in romantic themed stories when she develops feelings for her married colleague Nate Cooper (Kyle Pryor). Their attraction causes a feud between Hannah and Nate's mentally unstable wife Sophie Taylor (Bridgette Sneddon). When Hannah and Nate share a kiss, Sophie takes Nate hostage and causes a bus crash. The scenes formed the 2014 series finale and Hannah was left with life changing injuries after two of her vertebrae were crushed leaving her paralysed. The story marked the character's first issue-led storyline. Howarth researched the plot intensively because she wanted to portray the disability correctly. Writers eventually paired Hannah and Andy together again. But their relationship is marred with Andy's personal issues, Hannah's struggle to regain the use of her legs and Hannah's infidelity with her ex-fiancé Sean Gleeson (Luke Pegler). After her break-up with Andy, she starts dating Chris Harrington (Johnny Ruffo). The character was killed off on 5 May 2016 ending two and a half years on the show. She suffered a head injury during an explosion at the Caravan Park.

== Casting ==
The character and Howarth's casting were publicised on 27 August 2013. The character made her on-screen debut during the episode broadcast on 29 August 2013.

== Development ==
=== Characterisation ===
Hannah is the youngest daughter of a well off family and as such, has enjoyed all the privileges financial security and parental support can provide. But that doesn’t mean she’s cruised through her life… on the contrary, Hannah has always been determined to ‘make it on her own’.

— An excerpt taken from The official Home and Away website revealing Hannah's background.

Hannah is characterised as being "a free spirit". Howarth called her character strong and determined. She also stated that Hannah would "fight fiercely for her family", but she has a fear of being alone and needs to be loved. The character is described on the show's official website as striving to be an independent female despite coming from a wealthy background. Hannah is left with the responsibility of caring for her deceased sister's children Oscar (Jake Speer) and Evelyn MacGuire (Philippa Northeast). Howarth told a Yahoo!7 reporter that "Hannah has to now struggle to stay selfless and responsible, to make sure the twins have the life their mother wanted for them." Hannah is a strong and determined woman who is prepared to fiercely fight for the interests of her family. But Howarth noted that despite this, "[Hannah] needs to feel loved as she has a fear of being alone." Howarth described Hannah's qualities as a "big heart" and being a positive person with "much get up and go".

=== Introduction ===
Hannah comes to Summer Bay to ask Zac MacGuire (Charlie Clausen) for his help, when she believes their niece and nephew are being brainwashed by a cult that Zac's brother, Ethan (Matt Minto), has got them involved in. Howarth explained "Hannah hasn't seen Zac in years, because he's been estranged from his brother. Hannah's sister, Sarah, was married to Ethan, but died a year ago. Hannah has been looking after the kids and helping her brother-in-law. She's played a real motherly role with them." Zac initially thinks Hannah is over reacting, but decides to go and see Ethan and his children at the camp. Howarth said that Hannah has been to the camp a few times and has got a bad feeling about what goes on there. Ethan gives Hannah and Zac a tour; passing the place off as a group enlightening camp. Howarth called the storyline "hard-hitting" and added that it was not a smooth transition to life in the Bay. When Hannah arrives in Summer Bay she is in a lonely stage of her life. She feels as though she has no one due to her sister's death. The town provides a community atmosphere which Hannah embraces and Howarth added that her character wants to share this with Oscar and Evelyn.

Hannah moves in with Zac and the twins, but her brother-in-law has romantic feelings for her and they try to start a relationship. It develops following the explosion at the hospital and the twins going missing, Hannah seeks comfort with Zac. Clausen said that "they're very attracted to each other. He's opened his arms to her and helped her through so much."

The pair decide to have a temporary break-up to concentrate on the twins well being. But Zac struggled to be around Hannah and she began spending time with Andy Barrett (Tai Hara) and an attraction develops between them. Clausen told Rebecca Lake from TV Week that "Zac never thought Hannah would be looking elsewhere for romance or that anyone else had come on the scene. It's a blow to his ego!" When Zac and Hannah stop communicating, he looks through Hannah's phone and she catches him. Clausen tried to defend his character's spying, saying that he does not mean to check up on her, but Hannah has the right to be angry. While Zac evaluates the situation he becomes regretful about his actions because he still has feelings for Hannah.

=== Relationship with Andy Barrett ===
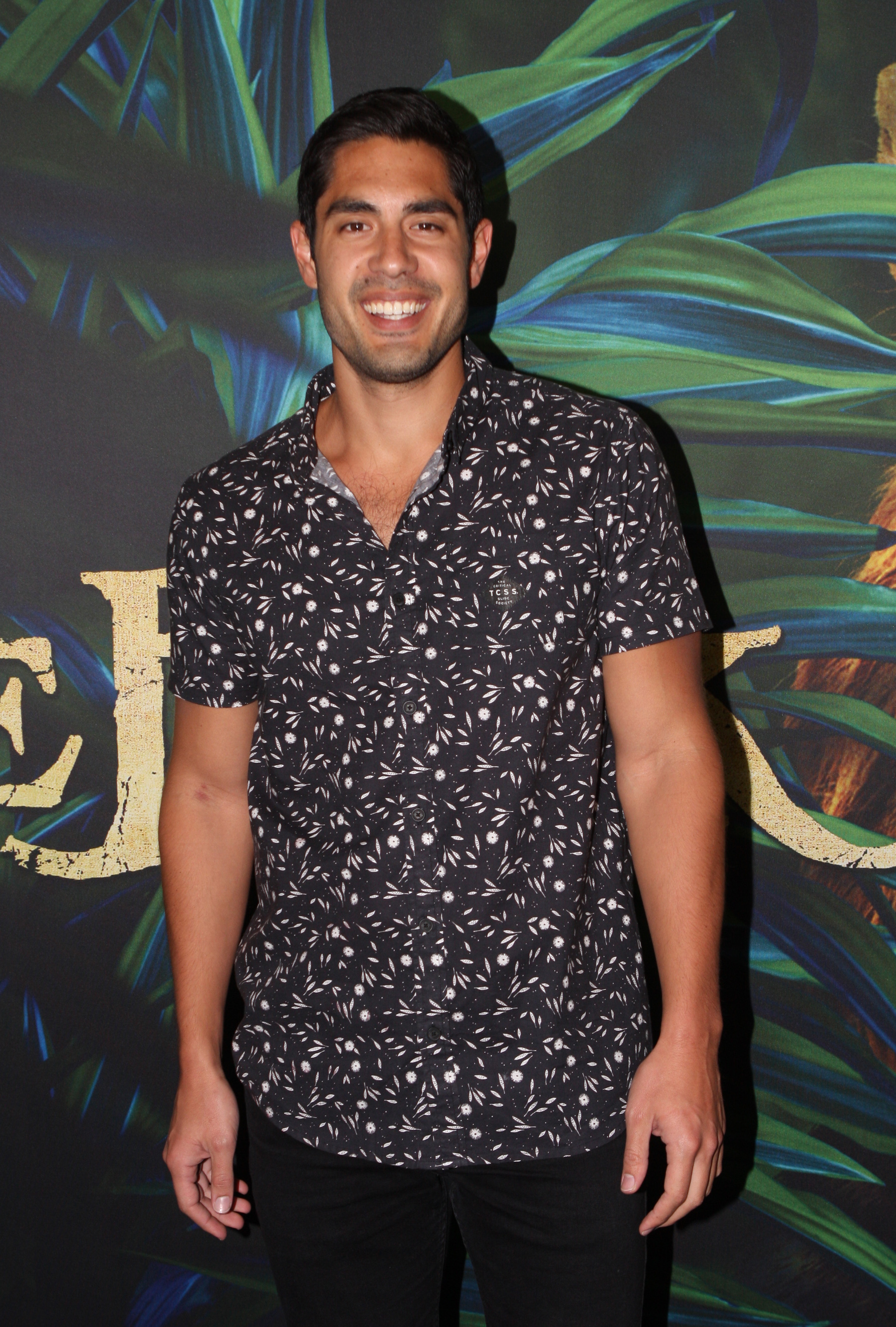
Tai Hara (pictured) played Hannah's second love interest Andy Barrett.

The show created a new romance storyline for Hannah with trouble-making character Andy. The show involved Andy is a drug dealing story in which he sells marijuana. On one occasion he stores a supply of the drug in Hannah's home but she discovers it and flushes it down the toilet. Hannah's actions leave Andy in debt and endanger his brother, Josh Barrett's (Jackson Gallagher) life. The storyline created increased danger and Andy was eventually beaten up by his suppliers. Hara said that Hannah finds Andy left on the side of a road with "quite severe injuries". He also warned that the unpredictable nature of the drug dealers leave those closest to him, including Hannah, at risk. An Inside Soap writer said that the beating leaves Hannah shocked.

Following their second attempt at their relationship and her paralysis, Hannah tries to help to improve Andy's literacy skills. Andy needs to qualify as a personal trainer and pass exams. Hannah attempts to tutor Andy but he becomes irate and the pair argue. A TV Soap reporter stated that Andy "hated feeling like a five year old in front of her." Andy tells Josh the truth which makes Andy realise that he needs to apologise to Hannah. Part of Andy's motivation to succeed at his exams is to make Hannah proud, so Andy receives tutoring from Josh instead of Hannah. Howarth told Kerry Harvey from TV Guide that Hannah and Andy have complete opposite personas but "balance each other well". She concluded, "I think with what's happened with the accident he's really risen to the occasion and he's been so good to her. I think at least for a while they'll be able to be happy."

Following Hannah's recovery and reuse of her legs, producers decided to create a series of new relationship problems for the duo to work through. Andy becomes jealous of Hannah's new found freedom: he sees Hannah dancing with another man and becomes violent and punches him. Hara said that the bad side of Andy had not surfaced for sometime, but seeing Hannah with another man makes him "see red". Hannah then meets her ex-boyfriend Sean Gleeson (Luke Pegler) and is unfaithful. Howarth said that her character "loves Andy and doesn't want to hurt him, but ultimately she's not happy." Hannah remembers how exciting her life was with Sean and doesn't feel the same when she is with Andy. The pair are nearly caught in bed together when Andy comes home early. As she is not vindictive, Hannah struggles with the guilt of cheating, but still decides she wants Sean instead. But Hannah is shocked to learn that Sean is married and realises her mistake. She wants her infidelity to remain a secret, but Sean's wife arrives to confront Hannah. Howarth stated that the whole situation "blows up in her face". Hannah tells Sean that she is going to be honest with Andy, unaware that Josh has recorded her.

=== Nate Cooper ===
"He wants out of his marriage with Sophie. Hannah doesn't know what to think of his announcement - she can't deny that she has some strong feelings for Nate, but she doesn't want to have anything to do with breaking up a marriage."

— a TV Soap columnist on Hannah's morality.

In later 2014, Hannah was briefly separated from Andy. Writers used the opportunity to introduce the character into her colleague Nate Cooper's (Kyle Pryor) storylines. Hannah develops feelings for him, but in denial over their attraction, Hannah's niece Denny Miller (Jessica Grace Smith) forces her to acknowledge her crush. His wife Sophie Taylor (Bridgette Sneddon) becomes suspicious of Hannah's intentions and is jealous when she sees Nate comforting Hannah. Hannah and Nate's attraction grows and the pair kiss while at work. Pryor told Stephen Downie from TV Week that "it's a spur of the moment thing" as Nate too had been in denial. He has relationship problems with Sophie but continues to protest she is imagining the attraction. Pryor added that Hannah is attractive and Nate is not having fun in his marriage. While he should keep away from her, "he's looking for moral support and he finds that in Hannah."

While Nate is in hospital following an abdominal injury, Hannah presides over his treatment, which annoys Sophie. Howarth says that Hannah and Sophie have never got on properly since they met. Though "Hannah seems to be enjoying his company more than perhaps she should. To Sophie, everytime Hannah and Nate are even in the same room it looks suspicious." Desperate to keep Hannah away from Nate, she tries to compromise her career by accusing Hannah of medical negligence. This causes an argument between the two, and Nate tries to defuse the situation. As a result, he collapses and requires additional treatment. Howarth believes that it was her character's fault, and Hannah is left with the task of saving Nate's life. The pair kiss again, Pryor says a "good connection" had been developed between the two and it is hard for Nate to resist temptation. Sophie witnesses their tryst and retaliates by taking an overdose of pills she steals from Hannah.

=== Paralysis ===
For the 2014 series finale, Home and Away devised a bus crash story for their annual "cliffhanger". Hannah is one of the characters caught in the accident. Sophie becomes increasingly unhinged in the aftermath of Nate's infidelity and causes their vehicle to crash into the bus. The crash leaves Hannah and several other character's lives in danger. When the show returned in 2015, Hannah is seriously injured in the accident and is impaled by a piece of metal which lodges in her spine. Nate rushes to free her and save her life. It was played out as a "touch and go as to whether she will survive" scenario. Hannah is freed from the wreckage after drifting in and out of consciousness due to pain. But the "real battle" to survive starts in hospital when she is rushed into surgery. After, Nate informs Hannah that she has two crushed vertebrae and that she may never walk again. Howarth branded it an "horrific" situation for her character. First she believes she might not live and secondly she faces the prospect of being permanently paralysed. This leaves Hannah without any hope. Her nursing profession also plays a part in Hannah's pessimistic attitude. Howarth added that "Hannah knows what it means to be injured. So, no matter how much Nate assures her she will heal, she knows the facts."

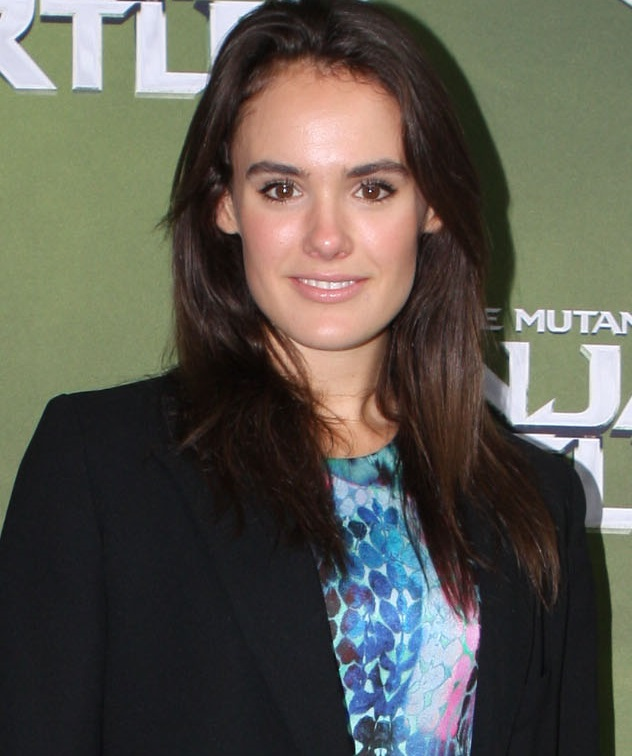
Certain aspects of Hannah's paralysis upset Howarth (pictured)

Howarth began researching paralysis and read about people's experiences living with the condition. She found it difficult to comprehend because she believed it an impossible situation to come to terms with. She wanted to do the story "justice" and make it believable to respect those who really do lose their ability to walk. Howarth added "at the same time, you can really only go as far as the script takes you and, of course, it's television and it's going to be exaggerated a little."

One issue led part of the storyline showed Hannah wanting to be intimate with Andy. But due to her disability he is afraid of hurting her. Howarth was unhappy when she read the scripts as believed there were other topics that the storyline could have explored. However writers told Howarth that it is a "very real situation" and one they felt Home and Away needed to portray. Hara also defended the storyline stating, "I don't think anyone could possibly imagine this until they were in that situation." It began on-screen as Hannah presumes that she is a burden on Andy. She wants to have sex and Andy's reluctance leaves Hannah feeling dejected. Howarth told an Inside Soap writer that Andy "freaks out" when Hannah tries to be intimate. That while Andy has been "fantastic" to Hannah, they do not have the same physical relationship they once shared so he finds it "strange". Nate informs Andy that there is no medical reason not resume sexual activity. Before he can apologise, Hannah ends their relationship wanting him to "enjoy a normal life" elsewhere. Howarth added that "Andy has become more like a carer to Hannah than a boyfriend, and she doesn't want that for either of them. She wants Andy to have the opportunity to be happy with someone else." Despite this their love for one another remains and the actress added that Andy chooses not to give up on their relationship. But warned "it's going to be a big challenge going forward." Andy decides he wants to be with Hannah still and tries to convince her otherwise. Hara told Erin Miller (TV Week) that Andy told Hannah he had changed and now he wants to prove it. His aim is to show Hannah that he loves her.

The pair get back together but Hannah develops "cabin fever" from being homebound. She decides she needs to do something spontaneous and begs Andy to take her out on a boat ride. Howarth explained that being stuck at home has "taken its toll on her both physically and emotionally" and is "desperate" to go outside. The writers threw Hannah into yet another dangerous scenario as their boat capsizes and paralysed Hannah begins to drown. Howarth added that it is dangerous because of her condition and Andy frantically searches for her to save her. The stunt was actually only filmed in waist-deep water and Howarth had to make her character's drowning look authentic. Hannah regains feeling in her legs and in time makes a full recovery.

=== Relationship with Chris Harrington ===
Following the second break-down of her relationship with Andy, writers devised a new screen partner for Hannah. Hannah works alongside Chris Harrington (Johnny Ruffo) on a charity fund-raiser and they become better acquainted. When Hannah and Chris both have bad experiences dating, Irene Roberts (Lynne McGranger) suggests that the two should date which is not well received by Hannah. Howarth told a TV Week reporter that Hannah had not contemplated romance with Chris because she considered them only as friends. Writers created an ex-girlfriend for Chris to continue to develop their bond. Ivana Frost (Tegan Martin) pays a visit to Summer Bay, but Chris feels he must prove he has moved onto a more successful life and convinces Hannah to pose as his girlfriend. Ivana does not believe them because of Chris, Hannah fakes a kiss with him to fool Ivana's suspicions. Howarth commented that her character thinks she is helping Chris because "Hannah loves hanging out with Chris. She thinks he is really funny and he is a breath of fresh air." The two become official following Hannah's jealousy when Chris kisses another woman. Howarth revealed that Hannah feels awkward about the kiss, but more unsettled that it makes her jealous. She truly believed Chris was just a friend and her jealousy peaks when he asks for dating advice. Hannah feels she cannot explain her feelings and reacts by kissing Chris. Howarth explained "she doesn't know how to articulate the way she feels, she just wants to kiss so she does." But writers soon introduced problems playing Hannah wanting to be secretive about their romance. Chris eventually threatens to leave Hannah and she publicly confirms their relationship to other characters.

Writers later reintroduced Hannah's main love interest Andy into her story, forming a love triangle. Howarth said that her character would try to "right her wrongs" in 2016. Hannah wants to learn from past mistakes when she ruined her relationship with Andy by being unfaithful. Ultimately Hannah wants "a fresh start". But by episodes airing in February 2016, Hannah succumbs to Andy's advances while still with Chris. Hara told Downie that "they've been through so much together, but, I think the constant is that he's always loved her." It marked the first time she reciprocates and is unfaithful to Chris.

=== Departure ===
During episodes broadcast on 5 May, Hannah was caught up in the Caravan Park explosion and received a head injury. She initially appeared to be fine, but she later collapsed with internal bleeding and died Howarth later posted a message on her social media account, saying she was "forever grateful" for her time on the show.

== Reception ==
An Inside Soap reporter included Hannah and Andy's romance in their "best bits of August [2014]" feature. They branded Hannah a "naughty nurse" and said they had undeniable on-screen chemistry. Stephen Downie (TV Week) branded Hannah an "unlucky-in-love" character. He later said that the chemistry between Hannah and Nate was "just too strong" and they were "like super-magnets".
