= Nate Cooper =

- Home and Away character
- Portrayed by: Kyle Pryor
- Duration: 2013–2017
- First appearance: 26 September 2013
- Last appearance: 5 June 2017
- Introduced by: Lucy Addario
- Book appearances: Home and Away: An Eye for an Eye; Home and Away: New Beginnings
- Spin-off appearances: Home and Away: An Eye for an Eye (2015); Home and Away: Revenge (2016); Home and Away: All or Nothing (2017)
In-universe information
- Occupation: Doctor
- Father: Gavin Cooper
- Wife: Sophie Taylor (until 2015); Ricky Sharpe (2016)
- Stepsons: Casey Braxton

Nate Cooper is a fictional character from the Australian soap opera Home and Away, played by Kyle Pryor. The character made his first screen appearance on 26 September 2013. Pryor originally auditioned for another character before he was offered the role of Nate. He had to keep his involvement with the show a secret prior to arriving on-screen. The actor had moved from another country for work which made him similar to his character. Nate is characterised as a career driven and respected doctor. He comes to work Northern Districts Hospital because he had longed to work in a busy emergency department. Personally he is calm and collected with a love of kayaking.

Nate's storylines have often focused on his on/off relationship with Ricky Sharpe (Bonnie Sveen). The pair have reunited at various points during Nate's time in the show. However, the constant presence of Ricky's ex-partner Darryl Braxton (Steve Peacocke) has always ruined their relationship. In 2014, the show explored Nate's backstory by casting Bridgette Sneddon to play Nate's estranged wife Sophie Taylor. Their marriage had broken down because of the latter's drug addiction. Her arrival prompts Nate to give her another chance. However, her mental health and obsessive nature cause Nate endless problems. She starts fires, attacks Nate's friends, kidnaps him and causes a bus crash. Other relationships include Nate developing feelings for Hannah Wilson (Cassie Howarth) and later romancing Katarina Chapman (Pia Miller). Their relationship was jeopardised by a false accusation of sexual assault made by Billie Ashford (Tessa de Josselin). Another main story for Nate involved him being in a life-threatening accident in the Australian bush damaging his liver. Nate has proved to be a popular character with critics of the genre due to his attractive appearance. Nate made his final appearance during the episode broadcast on 5 June 2017.

== Casting ==
The character and casting was announced on 8 September 2013. Pryor originally auditioned for the role of Andy Barrett, but Tai Hara was cast instead. However, the producers liked Pryor so much, that they asked him to return to try out for the part of Nate. Pryor had begun filming four months prior to his casting announcement. Of having to keep his role a secret, the actor admitted "It can be quite difficult not spilling the beans but it is a good exercise in self-control." British born Pryor had also moved to Australia following living in New Zealand. He said that he and his character had been on similar journeys.

== Development ==
=== Characterisation and introduction ===
"Doctor Nathaniel Cooper, who prefers to be called Nate, is a young man embarking on his career in Medicine. It’s all he’s ever wanted to do and he’s damn good at it. From a working class family, Nate struggled to deal with the ongoing illness of his mother. He, along with his father and siblings, had to navigate the emotional minefield of watching the most important person in their lives slowly fade away from them. He vowed that he was going to make sure no other family would ever go through what they were going through."

Nate is characterised as a career driven man due to his childhood experiences. Nate's profile on the show's official website details a backstory of having to cope with a terminally ill mother, a poor financial situation while studying a medical degree. Nate is described as a "fighter" who keeps on progressing despite a troubled personal life. Other character's are drawn to Nate due to his positive outlook on life. He comes to work Northern Districts Hospital because he had longed "for the adrenalin rush a busy Emergency Department provides." Nate is a respected medic and fellow residents appreciate his skills. Nate is a calm character and it takes a lot of drama to unsettle him. Writers have only used Nate's love for others to "shake him" emotionally. One of Nate's hobbies often portrayed in the show is kayaking. Production asked Pryor if he had any sporting abilities. He informed them that he had kayaked when he was younger and believed they would not be interested. However, they liked the idea and made Nate a kayaking enthusiast.

=== Relationship with Ricky Sharpe ===
Nate enters a relationship with Ricky Sharpe (Bonnie Sveen), who had recently separated from Darryl Braxton (Steve Peacocke) after he was sent to prison. The pairing was formed over many episodes as Nate supported Ricky through the aftermath of a bomb blast, a miscarriage and Brax's incarceration. The two characters grow close and attend a funeral together, where it becomes obvious they share feelings for each other. A TV Soap writer noted that Ricky had tried to suppress her feelings for Nate, but could no longer hide it. When Nate kisses Ricky she decides to avoid being in his company. Ricky believes she has unresolved issues with Brax that prevent her from entering a relationship with Nate. She also faces disapproval from Brax's brother Kyle Braxton (Nic Westaway) which results in a confrontation with Ricky. When Kyle realises that Ricky has the right to move on, he encourages her to date Nate.

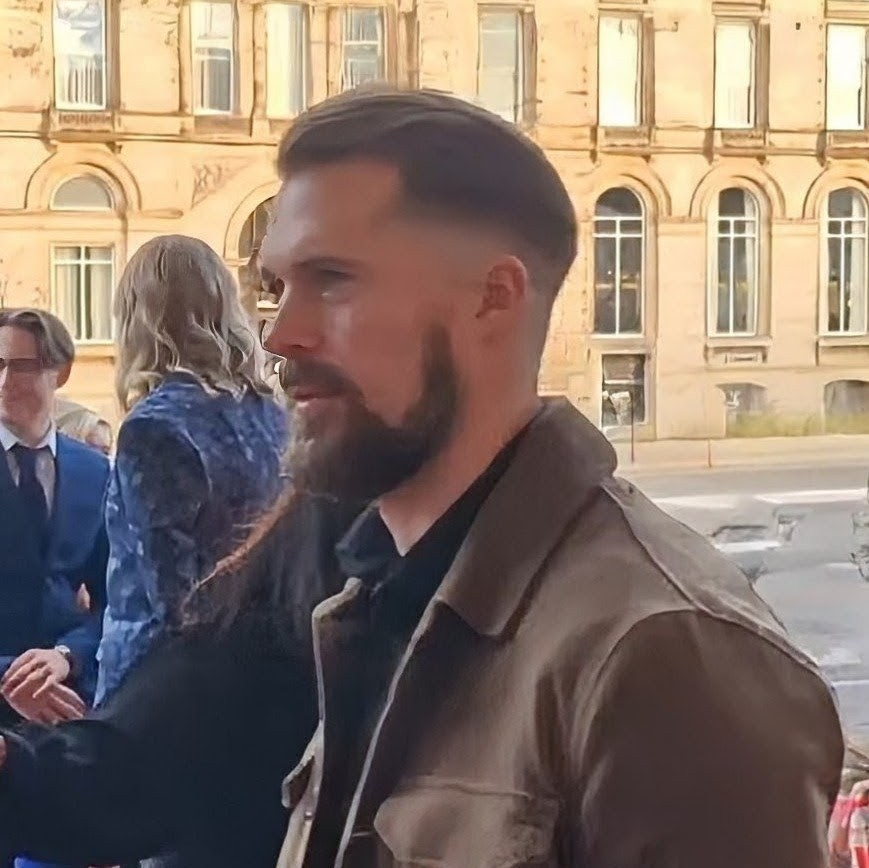
Kyle Pryor (pictured in 2025) plays Nate

When Brax is released from prison he tries to win Ricky back. Nate visits Brax to request that he leave Ricky alone and avoid complicating her life. Sveen believed that Nate's actions were motivated purely out of concern for Ricky. However, Ricky is defined as an independent woman and would not like Nate intervening. Ricky and Nate argue when she learns the truth. Pryor said that Brax's reintroduction would have always created friction and drama for the duo. He added that his character had forgotten "that fire" Ricky has for her own independence. She views Nate as "condescending" and orders him to leave her alone. Ricky is left confused about her feelings for both men. Nate decides to fight for Ricky and confirms his love for her. He "pours his heart out" and tells her that he will always strive to make her happy. When she visits Brax the pair end up sleeping together. Sveen believed that Ricky has always loved Brax. She told a reporter from Inside Soap that viewers were divided as to who Ricky should be with. She added that older female viewers prefer Nate while the rest prefer Brax. Their storyline concludes when Ricky leaves Nate in favour of a photography career in London.

=== Marriage to Sophie Taylor ===
Bridgette Sneddon was hired to play Nate's estranged wife Sophie Taylor. She arrives in Summer Bay and introduces herself to Nate's ex-girlfriend Ricky. She is furious with Nate for keeping his marital status a secret, which leaves Nate confused as she is back with Brax. Sneddon told an Inside Soap reporter that Nate and Sophie's marriage was ruined by Sophie's drug addiction. She explained that writers created a backstory in which Sophie was involved in a car accident and relied on pain killers in her recovery. As Nate had access to medication in his profession he was able to supply her with the medication she needed. As she became reliant on the drugs it caused trouble in their relationship, resulting in Nate leaving her. The character remained in the series and aimed to convince Nate to give their marriage another chance. When she feels ill, Nate fears that she is pregnant and is attempting to trap him. She later collapses and is diagnosed with appendicitis. Her operation causes pain and she is required to take prescription medication to aid her recovery. Nate fears that Sophie will become hooked on the drugs once again.

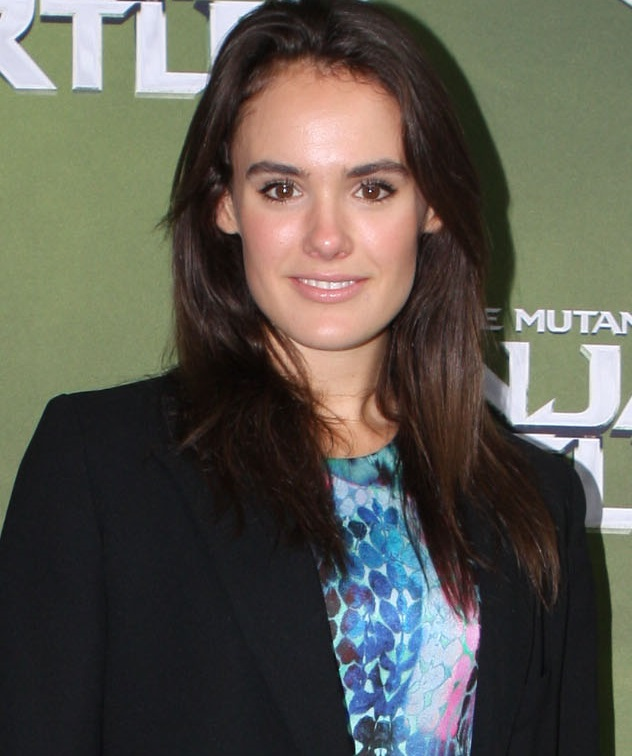
Cassie Howarth (pictured) plays Nate's friend Hannah Wilson.

Nate's friend Leah Patterson-Baker (Ada Nicodemou) begins to worry about Sophie's condition. Nate tires of Leah's interference and he becomes aggravated. Pryor said that Nate wants to move on with Sophie but cannot because Leah keeps reminding him of his past. Sneddon added that Sophie takes a dislike to Leah and there is tension between them. Pryor added that Nate is "really pushing his concerns about Sophie to the back of his mind." Sophie uses an opportunity to divert Leah's interest elsewhere and encourages her to romance Zac MacGuire (Charlie Clausen). Sneddon explained that while Sophie genuinely tries to help Leah and Zac, "it helps her cause" to have Nate to herself.

Sophie's dislike of Nate's friends grows. She becomes convinced that Nate is sleeping with his colleague Hannah Wilson (Cassie Howarth). Her accusation is not unfounded as Hannah is secretly in love with Nate. Sophie becomes jealous of their friendship and annoyed when she witnesses Nate consoling Hannah. Nate becomes unhappy with Sophie and his attraction to Hannah grows and the pair kiss. Pryor told Stephen Downie from TV Week that "it's a spur of the moment thing" as Nate too had been in denial. He has relationship problems with Sophie but continues to protest she is imagining the attraction. Pryor added that Hannah is attractive and Nate is not having fun in his marriage. While he should keep away from her, "he's looking for moral support and he finds that in Hannah." Pryor also believed that Nate wanted to help Sophie with her issues but it no longer matters to him.

Following time apart Sophie tries to spend time with Nate. He tells her that he will not give their marriage another chance despite her pleas to overcome her addiction. Sneddon explained that she still had faith in the estranged couple because they share a connection. Nate decides the only way to escape Sophie is to leave Summer Bay. Sophie becomes delusional and tells Ricky that Nate is sending her love letters when he has not. When Ricky confronts Nate he reveals that Sophie has a history of mental health issues. He reveals that when he originally called time on the marriage, she attempted to run him over. Pryor said that it was a difficult situation for Nate because he does love Sophie. However, being apart from each other is the only solution. "Nate believes that tough love is the only approach here." Sophie is upset and begins to forget what day it is. Her "bizarre behaviour" worries other residents. Sophie cannot deal with the "harsh reality" that her marriage is over. She has a mental breakdown and begins a fire in her caravan to attract Nate's attention. Pryor described her as "working herself into a state". Sneddon stated that Sophie "knows what to do to keep Nate on the end of the fishing line." Her plan works and Nate risks his life and pulls her from the burning caravan.

Sophie's mental state deteriorates and she begins to behave more obsessively towards Nate and later stalks him. Nate tries to distance himself from her further but she lures him to her hotel room and knocks him unconscious. She pours petrol around the room and threatens to start a fire with a candle. Pryor found filming the scenes an intense experience. It took a series of thirteen scenes shot over an entire day. Pryor told Colin Vickery of news.com.au that "it was a big challenge emotionally as well as technically, I felt a strong sense of responsibility in playing that (scenes involving mental instability and violence)." Nate tries to convince Sophie to let him go and promises they will leave Summer Bay to restart their relationship elsewhere. While driving away she realises he has lied and she crashes his car which collides with a bus filled with several other regular characters. The scenes formed the 2014 annual series cliffhanger. In the aftermath of the accident Nate battles to save as many lives as possible. Pryor explained "Nate feels extremely guilty for what's happened, he's trying everything he can to save these people, because he feels very much responsible. He wants to take control of things now, and deal with the repercussions later."

=== Accident in the bush ===
Writers devised a deadly scenario for the character when he is involved an accident in the Australian bush. Nate and Brax go in search of missing VJ Patterson (Matthew Little) who has been tied up by Tyson Lee (Ben Bennett). Nate stumbles and falls down a ravine. To his horror Nate realises that on impact he has been impaled by a tree branch and is stuck in a remote area of the bush. Pryor explained that his medic character is worried because of the site of the impalement. Nate is "horribly impaled on a protruding stick, he thinks it may have even pierced his liver." Brax has to try to save Nate's life while he continues to bleed "profusely". Nate tries to instruct Brax of ways to stabilise his condition. Pryor branded it is a "tricky situation" and said his character truly believed he would die from the injury. Nate begs Brax to help keep him awake because the medic knows if he were to lose consciousness it would likely kill him. A Soap World columnist announced that Nate's former love rival Brax would successfully perform the rescue because Brax does not want to feel responsible for anyone else losing their lives.

Nate is rushed to hospital and survives his injuries. Hannah presides over his treatment, which annoys Sophie. Howarth said that Hannah and Sophie have never liked each other. Though "Hannah seems to be enjoying his company more than perhaps she should. To Sophie, everytime Hannah and Nate are even in the same room it looks suspicious." Desperate to keep Hannah away from Nate, she tries to compromise her career by accusing Hannah of medical negligence. This causes an argument between the two, and Nate tries to defuse the situation. As a result, he collapses and requires additional treatment. Howarth believes that it was her character's fault, and Hannah is left with the task of saving Nate's life.

=== Relationship with Kat Chapman ===
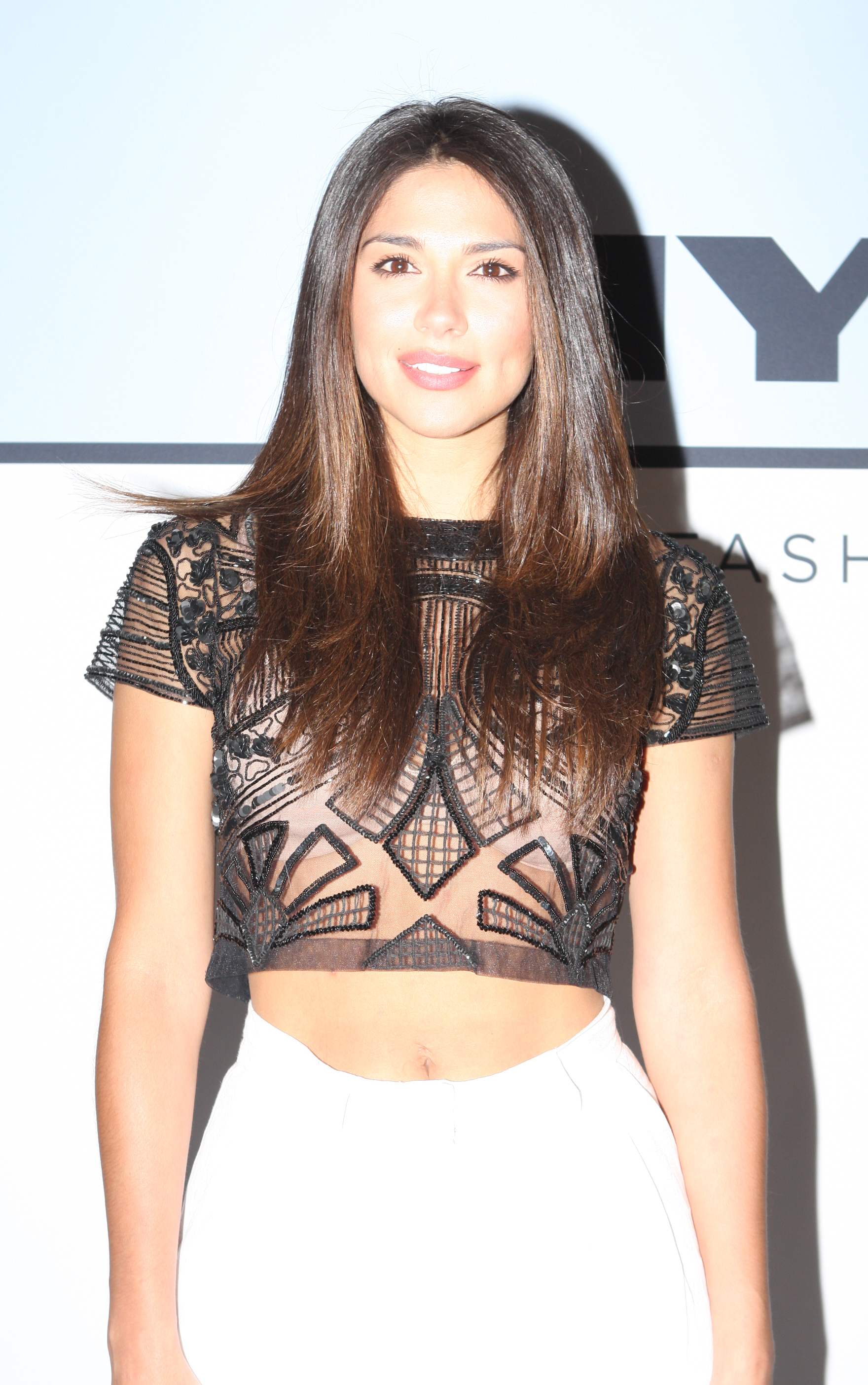
Pia Miller (pictured) plays Nate's love interest Katarina Chapman.

Writers devised a new romance story for Nate alongside Katarina Chapman (Pia Miller). The pair flirt and later spend the night together. However, Kat does not want to spend time with Nate the following morning. Pryor told an Inside Soap writer that there is an undeniable spark between them and Nate has much in common with Kat. They share a successful date but she wants to keep their romance a secret. Pryor stated that his character was confused by Kat wanting a casual relationship because they are both adults and should not be ashamed. He decides to behave "easy-going" and go along with Kat's wish of secrecy. When fellow Summer Bay residents begin to gossip about their relationship Kat dumps Nate. Producer Lucy Addario told Stephen Downie from TV Week that Kat would slowly "let her walls down" with Nate and become close to him. She explained that Kat's past was to blame for her reluctance to be with Nate.

In June 2015, it was announced that Nate would be involved in a controversial storyline in which Billie Ashford (Tessa de Josselin) accuses him of assault. Addario told Downie that the story was designed to test Nate and Kat's relationship. She called it a "vicious lie" that threatens to destroy Nate's integrity and career. Nate and Kat notice Billie floating face down in the sea and Nate rescues her. He has to resuscitate her to get her breathing again. Nate is very reassuring towards Billie that she will be okay. As Billie looks at Nate "adoringly", Stephen Downie of TV Week noted that she was developing a crush on the doctor. A Sunday Mail writer assessed that following this Billie behaves like an "obsessed teenager" and follows him around. Nate shows no interest in Billie and she becomes "unhinged" and tries to ruin Nate and Kat's relationship. Billie goes to visit Nate and realises that he is alone. She scratches his face, begins to rip her clothes and screams. This attracts the attention of Chris Harrington (Johnny Ruffo), who rushes to Billie's aid and she accuses Nate of assaulting her. Sergeant Mike Emerson (Cameron Stewart) takes Nate in for questioning, where he protested his innocence. However, Emerson then produced proof of a sexually explicit text message sent from Nate's phone to Billie the previous week.

Kat initially wants to support Nate and believes Billie is a liar. The accusation causes Kat to doubt Nate's innocence because of the text message. Kat has a duty as a n officer to take such accusations seriously. Kat decides to be honest with Nate and blames her past experiences for her doubting him. Nate pleads his innocence to Chris and Kat asks him to help catch Billie out. When Chris discovers that Billie is behind an embarrassing poster designed to ruin Kat's career, he agrees to help. Chris invites Billie over to his house wanting her confess to setting Nate up. He tells Billie that he knows Nate is innocent but wants to see him punished anyway. He suggests they work together, but Billie notices Chris is recording the conversation and stops it. Unbeknownst to her, Chris is wearing a wire and she then admits to framing Nate and Billie is arrested.

The events cause Nate to become stressed and overworked. He does not let Kat help him but when Ricky tries he listens to her. She convinces him to take a break from work to rest. Pryor said that Ricky is there for Nate in his "time of need" and the only one able to "get through to him". Nate later sees Ricky on the beach and a gust of wind blows documents from her hands. He helps her collect them and they share a "moment". Pryor said that his character is "surprised by what has happened, he thought his feelings for Ricky were in the past." Nate and Kat decide to resume their relationship following time apart. It does little to improve things due to Kat's lack of trust. Sveen told Downie that Ricky feels guilty for having feelings for Nate while he is still with Kat. However, Ricky cannot deny that there is "something special between them". Nate's relationship with Kat continues to deteriorate until they decide to break up. This leaves Ricky free to pursue Nate. Kat begins to struggle and learns of Nate and Ricky's tryst. She offers to forget about it and Nate feels obliged to get back with her. Pryor said that his character wanted to support Kat and agreed to give their relationship another chance. He thinks Kat needs him as much as Ricky does, which Pryor assessed as there being "a constant battle between his feelings and his obligations to the people close to him." However, their romance is set to fail as Kat notices Ricky staring at Nate and becomes suspicious once again. Nate later decides to be with Ricky instead. Pryor told Gavin Scott (TV Week) that Nate does not want to hurt Kat and will always care for her.

=== Reconciliation with Ricky ===
Ricky begins to develop feeling for Nate again following the departure of Brax. Ricky tells Nate that she has been picturing her life if she had of chose to remain with Nate and not reconcile with Brax. Nate is "gobsmacked" by Ricky's revelation and he shocks her by admitting he never stopped loving her. Pryor explained that his character had just been in denial and "hung up on her". Ricky asks Nate to leave but she changes her mind and chases after him, resulting in them kissing. However, her brother-in-law Kyle remains close and supports her through her ordeal. Kyle kisses Ricky and she is shocked and vows to forget about it. Nate witnesses the kiss and confronts Ricky over her feelings. Sveen told an Inside Soap columnist that "Ricky really is falling for Nate" and wants to forget about Kyle's mistake. She is unaware Brax is still alive and viewers were still supporting a reunion for them. Sveen believed that Ricky's own fans would prefer her to be in a stable relationship and which Nate can give her. She concluded with her belief that Ricky would remain loyal to Nate rather than Brax.

Nate decides that he wants to marry Ricky and makes plans for a proposal. Pryor told a reporter from New Idea that Nate had a vision of the perfect proposal. He added "there were a lot of blundered attempts, then Ricky got wind of it and it was all a bit of a nightmare, really." Nate becomes emotional while attending Zac MacGuire (Charlie Clausen) and Leah Patterson-Baker's (Ada Nicodemou) wedding and proposes. Ricky learns that Brax is still alive. Sveen added that the revelation could change everything for Ricky, but noted that Ricky and Nate's relationship could withstand as she would find it difficult to forgive Brax for letting her grieve. Sveen said that Ricky believed Nate is "good dad material". With so he bonds well with her son Casey.

Producers brought closure to the Ricky and Brax storyline and Peacocke returned to filming. Ricky is shocked that Brax is alive and cannot forgive him for fooling her and abandoning his child. He kisses Ricky but she rebuffs his advances. Sveen explained that "She's engaged to Nate now, and she believes that he is the right man for her." Sveen observed that viewers on social media were not as accepting of Ricky's relationship with Nate than they were with Brax. However, she believed that the older demographic were relieved Ricky had found a "nice, good boy" character. In March 2016, Pryor told an Inside Soap reporter that he had tried his best to win viewers acceptance of Nate and Ricky's relationship. The largely popular pairing of Ricky and Brax had a prominent fanbase. Pryor assessed that Nate is the complete opposite of Brax and the more suitable partner for Ricky. The fight for their relationship following Brax's departure as Nate is uncomfortable with Brax gifting a toy to his son. Pryor stated that Nate has reached a point where he wants to marry Ricky and start a family with her.

The preparations for their wedding was problematic. The pair argue on what type of ceremony to have. Pryor explained that Nate is so focused on doing everything right that he fails to consider what Ricky wants. Writers decided to create more problems for the pair using Brax. Ricky receives a text message from her former partner which makes her doubt marrying Nate. Pryor said Nate is not happy, but he trusts that Ricky wants to move forward with him. He added that ultimately Nate is "hoping for the best". Ricky's car breaks down and she is late for her wedding. The actor admitted that Nate thinks Ricky has changed her mind about marrying him. He added "matters of the heart have the ability to shake him." He tries to call the wedding off, but Ricky eventually arrives and they marry. The ceremony was filmed at Ku-ring-gai Chase National Park on a look-out point. Drone cameras were uses to film aerial shots of the character's nuptials. Pryor enjoyed filming the wedding because he believed it gave "a culmination" to Nate and Ricky's story.

Nate and Ricky are caught up in an explosion at the caravan park. Nate goes into "doctor mode" and discovers Ricky is trapped inside a caravan. He is "running on instinct" to save the woman he loves, but sustains serious injuries. Ricky has to have a hysterectomy and is unable to have any more children. Nate accepts the situation but the pair begin to argue more often. Ali Cromarty (TV Week) reported that Ricky thinks Nate will resent her for not providing him with a biological child. Nate insists that Ricky and Casey are enough for him.

=== Father ===
In 2015, Producers introduced Nate's father Gavin Cooper with Daniel Roberts in the role. The storyline explore Nate's past coming back to haunt him as he is forced to face the man who abandoned him as a child. After Nate's hostility subsides the pair try to repair their relationship. Nate is hopeful when he shares a pleasant meal with Gavin and Ricky. Gavin's behaviour becomes a concern when he gropes Ricky. She is unsure of informing Nate about Gavin's behaviour, but when he witnesses him drunk and flirting with Maddy Osborne (Kassandra Clementi), she tells Nate about the incident. Nate is angry and wants nothing more to do with his father. Daniel Kilkelly from Digital Spy observed that "Nate's old and unspoken anger comes flooding out" as he bans Gavin from his life. Gavin is involved in a car collision with a tree and rushed to hospital. Nate is shocked to witness his father being wheeled into the ward.

=== Departure ===
The character departed on 5 June 2017. Following the breakdown of his relationship with Tori Morgan (Penny McNamee), Nate decides to leave the Bay to take up a job with CareFlight. Pryor thanked the crew and fans of the show on his social media accounts after Nate's exit scenes were aired. He stated, "I want to say a big thank you to everyone who has followed Nate's journey on Home and Away. Playing Dr. Cooper has been a hugely rewarding experience... something I will never forget."

== Reception ==
Russell Blackstock writing for The New Zealand Herald branded Nate and Ricky "Home and Away's hot couple". Nate's charm and appearance have led columnists of Inside Soap to constantly refer to him as "Hunky Dr Nate" and dedicate an archive on their website to the term. A Soap World writer praised Sophie's involvement with "Dr Sexy" Nate and how she kept him at the forefront of the show.
