= Martin Ashford (Home and Away) =

- Home and Away character
- Portrayed by: George Mason
- Duration: 2014–2018
- First appearance: 27 October 2014
- Last appearance: 20 June 2018
- Introduced by: Lucy Addario
- Spin-off appearances: Home and Away: An Eye for an Eye (2015); Home and Away: Revenge (2016); Home and Away: All or Nothing (2017)
In-universe information
- Occupation: Waiter; Mechanic; Garage co-owner
- Brothers: Patrick Stanwood
- Sisters: Billie Ashford
- Nieces: Luc Patterson

Martin "Ash" Ashford is a fictional character from the Australian soap opera Home and Away, played by George Mason. The character made his first screen appearance on 27 October 2014. When Mason auditioned he believed Ash to be a "great character" and moved from Melbourne to accept the role. Ash is characterised as a tough, ex-prisoner who has a backstory of criminal activity. He was sent to prison after committing a robbery with Dean Sanderson (Kevin Kiernan-Molloy), but he framed Ash as the sole perpetrator and turned his sister Billie (Tessa de Josselin) against him.

Ash is introduced into the show as an old prison friend of established character Darryl Braxton (Steve Peacocke) and they soon embark on a journey into the Australian Outback in search of Billie. His storyline continued to be centric to Brax's story. The show later developed a relationship storyline with Denny Miller (Jessica Grace Smith). Critics have stated that the character quickly assumed the role of the show's "hunk" and "bad boy". Mason decided to leave Home and Away in early 2018. His character took a temporary break in April, ahead of his departure on 20 June 2018.

== Casting ==
New Zealand born George Mason had been residing in Melbourne when he secured an audition for the role. He recalled thinking that Ash was a "great character". He was about to sign a long-term lease on a property in the city when he discovered he had been awarded the role. A Woman's Day reporter commented that Mason would "bring an explosive plot line" to the show. Ash comes to Summer Bay looking for Darryl Braxton (Steve Peacocke). Mason's agent later confirmed that he would be playing Martin Ashford who goes by the nickname "Ash". The character was introduced on-screen during the episode broadcast on 27 October 2014.

== Development ==
=== Characterisation ===
Ash is tough and independent, resilient and focused. He’s had to watch his back, every minute of every day. Prison has hardened him, made him wary and often suspicious, but it hasn’t dampened his spirit or his resolve to clear his name. And it certainly hasn’t stopped him from having a wicked sense of humour and an almost hyperactive energy... he rarely sits still, and he’s hardly ever idle.

— An excerpt taken from The official Home and Away website.

Ash is portrayed as a tough male character that has had to survive prison. Despite this he has a comical side to his personality and behaves in a hyperactive manner. Ash is "haunted" because his sister wrongly believes he tried to blame her boyfriend for a joint crime. But he is the type of person who would "never dodge responsibility at the expense of another". Mason described his character as being "chilled" and said "He plays up like a second-hand lawnmower but it's all in good fun. I don't think he takes life too seriously but when it comes to family he definitely wants somewhere to belong." He added that Ash had a good heart, but his upbringing meant that he was a bit of a bad guy. Mason told a TV Week reporter that Ash behaves like a "mystery man". In reference to female attention Ash receives, he added that "it's certainly interesting when he hits the beach". Ash is also described as "a pretty raw sort of bloke". He added that he wants fun while in Summer Bay to catch up the time he lost while in prison. The actor believed that certain aspects of Ash could annoy viewers but predicted that he would become be a liked character.

=== Introduction ===
Ash arrives in Summer Bay to stay with his friend Brax who he had met while in prison. Mason told Kerry Harvey writing for TV Guide that "he will definitely ruffle a few feathers when he comes into the Bay. He's a tough sort of a bloke with a few unresolved issues. He's come to the Bay looking for Brax so it will be interesting to see what happens there, whether it's good or bad." Mason added that most of Ash's scenes are shared with Brax. He revealed an on-set "bromance" had formed with Peacocke, who acted as a mentor for Mason. When Brax becomes aggressive with his brother Kyle Braxton (Nic Westaway) because of his bad experiences in prison; the Braxton family question whether Ash should be around Brax. Westaway told a TV Week reporter that "everyone is trying to figure out whether having Ash there is going to help Brax work out his problems, or whether Ash will be a constant reminder of what was one of the most painful times in his life."

Ash's first storyline sees him heading into the Australian Outback with Brax in search of his sister Billie (Tessa de Josselin) and her violent boyfriend Dean Sanderson (Kevin Kiernan-Molloy). Mason told Sarah Ellis (Inside Soap) that "Billie is the only family Ash has left, and he feels they need to make amends now he's out of jail." They travel to Broken Hill in search of her only to find she has moved on. The duo meet Sam Kennedy (Wade Briggs) who tells them where Dean lives. Mason explained that Dean does not know where Billie is and Ash decides to get drunk to forget about it. Brax then follows Dean to an abandoned mine where he retrieves the money that Dean and Ash stole before the latter went to prison for the crime. Brax is vague about his encounter and refuses to fully explain how he got the money from Dean. Mason added that "the trip will be life-changing for Ash, without Billie in his life he will struggle to find a new direction." For the actor, filming in the outback was a welcome change because he felt like he was "shooting an action movie".

Dean is found dead and Brax is accused of his murder. Ash recalls his time in the outback and realises that Sam must be the actual culprit. Ash warns local police constable Katarina Chapman (Pia Miller) about his suspicions. Miller told TV Week's Stephen Downie that her character will not listen to anything Ash has to say about Sam. Ash and Brax decide to travel back to the outback to confront him directly. But they have to outsmart Katarina who is convinced that Brax plans to leave Summer Bay. Mason told Downie that Ash could have gone alone but Brax wants to confront Dean himself. He added that Ash feels obliged to help Brax because Dean's murder would not have implicated Brax had they not been searching for Billie. Mason later told an Inside Soap reporter that there is no plan but they do find Sam and have their suspicions confirmed. But Sam refuses to change his police statement. Brax's impending legal issues make Ash feel guilty. Mason explained "Brax is like family, and Ash feels responsible for him being in this situation in the first place. Ash wouldn't be able to live with himself knowing an innocent man went to jail because of him." He added that Ash would be forever indebted to Brax and his girlfriend Ricky Sharpe (Bonnie Sveen). Sveen added that with the evidence incriminating Brax, his lawyer advises him to accuse Ash of murdering Dean. But Brax's strong loyalty to Ash means betraying him is not an option. The storyline continues to develop animosity between Ash and Ricky. Sveen told Erin Miller (TV Week) that Ricky is "deeply wary" of Ash's continued presence. She does not trust him because he has got Brax into trouble.

=== Denny Miller ===
"She make's it her mission to persuade Ash they're meant to be together. Eventually he opens up and reveals he's never had a proper relationship. But with Denny still getting over the Casey-shaped hole in her heart, she says that neither of them is perfect... and that's what makes them right for each other."

— an All About Soap columnist observes Ash and Denny's relationship.

Ash becomes acquainted with Denny Miller (Jessica Grace Smith) and they flirt. Sophie Dainty of Digital Spy stated that "sparks fly" when they meet, adding that "the chemistry between the two is obvious." But their encounters occur not long after Denny's ex-boyfriend Casey Braxton (Lincoln Younes) had died. The show's producer Lucy Addario told TV Week's Downie that they had planned a romance storyline for Ash, "but in typical Summer Bay style, it won't be easy and things will get in the way." Denny later acknowledges her attraction to Ash and John Palmer (Shane Withington) encourages her to move on. Smith told Downie that "Denny was confused about her feelings for Ash. She had a lot of guilt about moving on from Casey." Denny decides to arrange a meeting with Ash and surprises Ash with a kiss. Smith added that "Ash is really into it, but suddenly he runs away." Smith later explained to an Inside Soap journalist that Denny is left confused by Ash's reaction. She added that Ash is Denny's type of love interest because she has never been attracted to the "typical clean-cut guy". Denny realises that Ash is being loyal to Brax, who in turn was looking out her best interests. She decides to must convince Ash to begin a relationship and he later agrees. They continue to date and Denny believes she has finished grieving for Casey. The pair decide to consummate their relationship but after Denny feel "odd". Mason told Downie (TV Week) that Ash is understanding of her situation and "he knows he's walking on shaky ground with her."

=== Departure ===
In April 2018, Mason confirmed that he was leaving Home and Away and had already filmed his final scenes. Mason commented that the role had been "a dream job", but it was also "overwhelming" playing a main character on the show. The show aired a temporary exit for Ash on 26 April 2018. His final appearance occurred during the episode broadcast on 20 June.

== Storylines ==
Ash goes to Angelo's to find Darryl Braxton, causing his girlfriend, Ricky to be wary of him. Ash later gets on the wrong side of Andy Barrett (Tai Hara). Brax reveals that Ash is his former cellmate, who helped him out while he was in prison. Brax gives Ash a job at his restaurant and lets him sleep on the couch. When Brax loses his temper with his brother, Ash realises that he is not coping and urges him to open up to his family about his time inside. Ash and Ricky join forces to help Brax. Ash announces that he wants to find his sister, Billie, and Brax joins him on a road trip to find her boyfriend Dean, who let Ash take the blame for an armed robbery they committed. They locate Dean and Brax manages to get Ash's share of the robbery money back. Ash gives the money to Phoebe Nicholson (Isabella Giovinazzo).

He meets Denny and flirts with her, causing Brax to warn him off as she was dating his younger brother Casey before his death. But he ignores Brax's advice and helps Denny fix her car and they bond. Ash sees that Denny is wearing her old engagement ring from Casey. Ash congratulates her assuming that she has a new fiancé. Ash and Andy Barrett (Tai Hara) travel to the city to accompany Phoebe at her concert. The duo are fooled and locked in a cellar by Neive Devlin (Jolene Anderson) who drugs Phoebe to create a career boosting scandal. Ash and Andy manage to escape and save Phoebe from her ordeal. Ash is shocked when Brax is arrested for murdering Dean and Ricky hits him believing he is to blame. Ash realises that Sam must have committed the crime but fails to convince Katarina. Ash and Brax head to the outback to confront Sam but he refuses to confess. When Brax faces his court hearing Sam exposes that they took stolen money from Dean's hiding place. When the money is found in Angelos, Ash is implicated in Dean's murder and arrested alongside Brax, but the latter takes the blame. Ash pledges to look after Ricky following Brax's imprisonment but she blames him and tells him to keep away. Ash decides to begin a relationship with Denny which annoys Ricky who believes he is betraying Brax. Brax is attacked in prison by Trevor Gunson (Diarmid Heidenreich) because he witnessed Ash visiting. Ash tells Ricky that Gunno wants revenge on him because he exposed his drug dealing. He visits Gunno who orders Ash to help him deal or he will kill Brax. Ash came to visit his late brother, Luke's grave and bumped into his sister, Billie Ashford (Tessa de Josselin), they talked for a while and Ash told Billie that Dean's dead and that he didn't punch the security guard during a robbery. Ash discovers that Kyle's been sleeping with Billie behind Phoebe's back after walking in on them. Ash thought Kyle had seduced her and attacks him, until Billie explained everything.

Ash finds out that from Chris Harrington (Johnny Ruffo) that Dr Nate Cooper tried to allegedly rape Billie and he attacks Nate at the police station. But Ash later uncovers out that Billie made up Nate's sexual assault and is mad at her for causing trouble. Billie tells Ash that she likes Nate, but he was dating Kat and since Dean died, she wants to move on, but Kyle and Nate both reject her. Ash finds out that Billie has leg injuries and burns from a fire after she rescues Zac MacGuire, (Charlie Clausen) Matt Page (Alec Snow) and Oscar MacGuire (Jake Speer) from the fire, which lit their house and that Billie is the main suspect behind the fire. Billie is to a hospital in the city. Kyle takes Ash's place during a drug deal. Later after Brax manages to get himself transferred to another prison after he reports Gunno, Kyle and Ash come up with an escape plan so Brax and Ricky can have a life with baby Casey. The plan goes haywire after Gunno sends someone to kill Brax. The police car transferring Brax is run off the road and into a river. Brax survives and convinces Ash to let everyone think that he is dead so his friends and family will be safe from Gunno. Ash reluctantly agrees. Denny eventually breaks up with Ash because of his lies and the dangerous choices he has makes. Ash and Phoebe have a fling when she and Kyle temporarily break up. Ash and Phoebe eventually start a relationship. Ash discovered that Phoebe is pregnant and he assumes he's the father. But Ash found out that Kyle's the father, causing a strain in his relationship with Phoebe and he breaks up with her. But they got back together and Ash tells Phoebe that he'll support the baby and will love the baby like his own. However, Phoebe discovered she's pregnant with twins, and suffered a miscarriage. Billie returns to Summer Bay and reunite with Ash, after she rescues Oscar. Billie was a main suspect when police discover Kat's missing handcuffs are in Billie's bag and Ash suspects that Zac's ex, Charlotte King (Erika Heynatz) is behind this. He comes to her house and attacks her, almost strangling her to death, until Kat stops him. Ash attends Zac and Leah Patterson-Baker's wedding. Ash became a suspect to Charlotte's murder and Kat's abusive ex-fiancé, Detective Dylan Carter (Jeremy Lindsay Taylor) suspects that Ash killed Charlotte and arrests him for murder, but the police have no evidence to prove him guilty. During Billie's trial, Ash is shocked when Zac and Charlotte's son, Hunter King (Scott Lee) confesses that he started the fire at Leah's house.

Ash notices that Kat has been seeing Dylan and warns her that Dylan is a bad influence, but she doesn't listen to him or to Phoebe. Ash and Phoebe break up when she finds out Ash was heavily drunk at a bar and finds a barmaid from the bar in his house the next day and assumes he is cheating on Phoebe and tells her the truth. The barmaid returns to collect her jewellery and Ash told her that he and Phoebe breaks up because he cheated on her. But the barmaid says that they have not slept together and she slept on the couch during the night he was drunk. Ash tells Phoebe the truth but Phoebe tells him that they can't be together anymore and they end things for good. Ash quickly moves on from Phoebe and starts to like Kat. Ash is held hostage by Dylan in his house, along Kat and Billie too. But Dylan is arrested. Kat and Ash soon fall in love and start a relationship, which makes Phoebe jealous. Ash finds out that Billie is pregnant with Leah's son VJ Patterson (Matt Little). Ash was happy when Billie and VJ are engaged and Ash accepts VJ. On Billie and VJ's wedding, Billie runs off. Ash finds out that VJ isn't the father of Billie's baby and that Irene Roberts' long lost son, Mick Jennings (Kristian Schmid) is the father, who raped Billie at the gym. In 2017, Ash meets his newborn niece, Luc Patterson. Ash discovers that Billie has lung cancer and has only a few moments to live. Ash is hurt and devastated when VJ tells him that Billie died on the beach in his arms, Ash breaks down and Justin Morgan (James Stewart) calms him down.

When VJ discovers that John Palmer (Shane Withington), is the arsonist behind the recent fires, he informs Ash who then heads to the hospital and openly blames John for Billie's death, lashing out at John and leading to the hospital's staff throwing Ash out. When Ash tries to assist Leah in helping to care for Luc, she constantly pushes him away and lectures him on how to care for Luc. Ash loses control and says that Leah is not Luc's real family. He then apologises and settles his differences with Leah, Irene and VJ. After he receives Billie's death certificate in the mail, Ash breaks down and Kat comforts him, leading to them having sex soon afterwards.

Ash tries to make it so that his niece will receive her late mother's money but must prove his brother Luke is dead first. Kat calls Births, Deaths and Marriages so that they can get Luke's death certificate, but there isn't one. An unknown caller then calls Ash and the caller turns out to be a man named "Patrick Stanwood". Ash is shocked as Stanwood sounds exactly like his late brother and he and Kat agree to investigate further. Kat has Stanwood's number traced by one of her colleagues and they head to Stanwood's address. After getting no answer from the door, Ash goes around the back and kicks the door in. Kat protests that they are breaking and entering, but Ash continues searching the house, to no avail. Just as they are about to leave Stanwood's house, a man appears out of the bushes and is revealed to be Luke. Ash then punches him in the face and he and Kat leave the area and go back to The Farmhouse. Ash wins custody over Luc and she moves in with Ash and Kat.

Ash starts to become close to Tori Morgan (Penny McNamee), which annoys Kat. But Ash becomes more annoyed when Kat becomes close to newcomer Robbo (Jake Ryan). Kat and Ash break up and Ash is annoyed when Kat quickly moves on and starts a relationship with Robbo. Ash accidentally sees Tori naked when he visits her house, while she is having a shower. Ash tells Hunter, who everyone, which upsets Tori. Ash confess to Justin that he has feelings for Tori, but Tori, who is unaware of Ash's feelings towards her tells him that she wants to be mates. Ash is annoyed when Tori went on a blind date with Colin and Ash interrupts the date, upsetting Tori. The next day, Ash confess his feelings to Tori and Tori believes Ash is using her as a rebound, after his break up with Kat. Leah and Justin tell Tori that Ash really likes her, and doesn't want to get back with Kat anymore. Ash later meets Liz after Luc's pram bumps into her baby, Phoenix's pram, which breaks the wheel. After Ash fixes it, Liz asks him out for a drink, and he accepts. They share a drink at Salt, with their babies but sees Tori there with Colin and becomes distracted when he keeps looking at Tori. Liz realises that Ash likes Tori and leaves with Colin. Tori leaves and Ash runs off, with Justin babysitting Luc. Ash confesses to Tori that he really likes her and kisses her, but she runs off after she kisses him back. The next day, Tori told Ash that she likes him and wants to be with him, and they kiss, starting a relationship. Ash and Tori go on their first date and they talk about taking their relationship further.

== Reception ==
Mason won two awards at the 2015 TV Week and Soap Extra #OMGAwards for Best Shock Kiss between his character Ash and Phoebe, and Best Love Triangle between Ash, Phoebe and Kyle Braxton (Nic Westaway). In August 2017, Mason was longlisted for Best Daytime Star at the Inside Soap Awards. The nomination did not progress to the viewer-voted shortlist. TV Guide's Harvey said Mason attracted international media interest even before he debuted on-screen. She added that Australian magazines were quick to brand him "Home And Away's newest hunk". A What's on TV reporter branded Ash a "handsome stranger". Bianca La Cioppa from TV Week did not approve of Ash's flirtation with Denny because it was too soon after Casey's death. But added "trust me, I get it. Ash is easy on the eye. Having him flirt with you would be mighty hard to resist." Her colleague Stephen Downie disagreed believing that Denny should be with "handsome Ash". A writer from TV Magazine said that the chemistry between "hot newcomer Ash" and Denny was undeniable.

A writer from New Idea branded Mason a "cute newcomer" and named his on-screen coutnerpart a "tough and resilient" character. TV Week's Sharon Goldstein Hunt branded Ash "the Bay's newest bad boy and Brax's bestie". While their colleague bemoaned Ash's lack of development writing "just who is Ash? By the end of last year's finale Brax's old prison buddy still seemed a bit of a mystery." Sarah Ellis of Inside Soap opined that Ash is "obviously no angel" and "there's not really much hope of him ever going straight" because of his connections to the Braxton family. But she did believe the character has heart because of his caring nature towards Billie and Brax. Ellis later observed, "Those luscious locks of his are obviously a magnet for the ladies of Summer Bay!"
