= List of Home and Away characters introduced in 2014 =

Home and Away is an Australian television soap opera. It was first broadcast on the Seven Network on 17 January 1988. The following is a list of characters that appeared in 2014, by order of first appearance. All characters were introduced by the serial's executive producer Lucy Addario. The 27th season of Home and Away began airing from 27 January 2014. The following month saw the characters Sean Green and Denny Miller introduced. Linda Somerset began appearing from April. Sophie Taylor arrived in June, while Martin Ashford made his debut in October. Jolene Anderson was introduced as Neive Devlin in November.

== Sean Green ==
Sean Green
- Home and Away character
- Portrayed by: Khan Chittenden
- First appearance: 6 February 2014
- Last appearance: 11 February 2014
- Introduced by: Lucy Addario

Sean Green, played by Khan Chittenden, made his first screen appearance on 6 February 2014. The character and Chittenden's casting was announced during the 1–7 February 2014 issue of TV Week. Sean is a part of established character Andy Barrett's (Tai Hara) "dark" past. Sean turns up in Summer Bay and trashes the gym, shortly after Andy begins working there. Andy is then blamed for the damage and shortly afterwards, he runs into Sean. Hara commented "Andy's shocked because Sean's the last person he'd expected to see in Summer Bay. Andy thought he was in jail." Sean wants Andy to go to the police and change his story about a deal they were both involved in. Sean then threatens Andy's younger brother, Josh (Jackson Gallagher) and his girlfriend Maddy Osborne (Kassandra Clementi),

Sean takes Maddy hostage, but lets her go when Kyle Braxton (Nic Westaway) tells him to. Kyle tries to give Sean some money, but he refuses to take it and attempts to punch Kyle. Kyle dodges the punch and beats Sean up. Sean tries to find a doctor and ends up at Irene Roberts's (Lynne McGranger) house. When Irene tells him that he needs help, he threatens her, Chris Harrington (Johnny Ruffo), Spencer Harrington (Andrew James Morley) and Sasha Bezmel (Demi Harman) with a kitchen knife. Sean attempts to take Sasha hostage, but Chris overpowers him and throws him into a chair. Sean is knocked unconscious and stops breathing, so Spencer performs CPR on him. Irene calls an ambulance and Sean is taken to hospital.

== Denny Miller ==
Denise "Denny" Miller, played by Jessica Grace Smith, made her first screen appearance on 12 February 2014. The character and casting was announced on 28 January 2014. Smith won the role in 2013, a week before she planned to move to Los Angeles. The actress commented "It was crazy! My bags were almost packed for LA. I was so stoked to be a part of the show and have full time work. It's an actor's dream." Denny is a tomboy and Smith described her as being honest and "pretty straight up". Smith branded Denny "not your typical girl" and adding that she would work in the bait shop with Alf Stewart (Ray Meagher).

== Linda Somerset ==
Linda Somerset
- Home and Away character
- Portrayed by: Hannah Britland
- First appearance: 1 April 2014
- Last appearance: 15 April 2014
- Introduced by: Lucy Addario

Linda Somerset, played by Hannah Britland, made her first screen appearance on 1 April 2014. Britland appears as Linda in five or six episodes as part of a storyline which sees several show regulars come to London. Britland commented "There is a possibility that I might go out to Australia next year, but nothing is confirmed yet. They came here and met Linda in London, so I was representing Britain for all the Australians to see. I hope I don’t mess it up for us!" The role gave Britland a chance to improve her Australian accent, which she thought was better than it was, until the Australian crew began laughing at her. Britland added "Linda is definitely British not Australian – she's from Preston." It was later confirmed that Casey Braxton (Lincoln Younes) would have a holiday romance with Britland's character. Younes stated that Casey and Linda would "hit it off from the get-go" and that she was fun.

Linda spots Casey Braxton on a tour bus. She later finds him in Trafalgar Square and gives him directions, before spending the rest of the day with him. Linda takes Casey back to her apartment and they have sex. Casey has to leave suddenly when he learns his brother has been taken to the hospital. Casey later returns to Linda's apartment and stays the night. After returning to Australia, Casey video chats with Linda. She asks Casey to return, but he tells her that he needs to stay and be with his family for the time being. A couple of weeks later, Linda invites Casey back to London. However, he tells her that he is dealing with some things at home and decides that they should not see or contact each other again.

== Sophie Taylor ==
Sophie Taylor
- Home and Away character
- Portrayed by: Bridgette Sneddon
- Duration: 2014–15
- First appearance: 3 June 2014
- Last appearance: 3 February 2015
- Introduced by: Lucy Addario
In-universe information
- Occupation: Principal of Summer Bay High (2014–15)
- Husband: Nate Cooper (until 2015)

Sophie Taylor, played by Bridgette Sneddon, made her first screen appearance on 3 June 2014. The character and Sneddon's casting was announced on 7 December 2013. Sneddon auditioned for the role on the advice of her agent and partner Steve Peacocke, who plays Darryl Braxton in the show. The actress filmed her first scenes during the week commencing 9 December. Holly Byrnes from the Herald Sun reported at the time Sneddon had not learned whether her character would have any airtime with Brax. Of her casting, Sneddon commented "I'm so happy. For so long, Steve's been talking about how great working on Home and Away is. Now I get to experience that too – plus we get to spend more time together, so it's win-win!" Sneddon filmed her final scenes in late 2014 and Sophie departed in early February 2015. Sneddon won the 2015 TV Week and Soap Extra #OMGAward for Best Villain for her portrayal of Sophie.

Sophie was billed as having "a connection to the Bay which brings her back", while Sneddon said her arrival would stir things up. Rebecca Lake from TV Week later reported that Sophie was Nate Cooper's (Kyle Pryor) estranged wife. Sneddon called Sophie's arrival "dramatic" and said she would apprehensive about seeing Nate for the first time in years, while Pryor quipped that Nate would be shocked and horrified to see Sophie. Sophie revealed to Nate that she had got a job in town and would be staying around indefinitely. She also admits that she still loves him and wants him back.

== Martin Ashford ==
Martin "Ash" Ashford, played by George Mason made his first screen appearance on 27 October 2014. A Woman's Day reporter commented that Mason would "bring an explosive plot line" to the show. Ash comes to Summer Bay looking for Darryl Braxton (Steve Peacocke). Mason described his character as being "chilled" and said "He plays up like a second-hand lawnmower but it's all in good fun. I don't think he takes life too seriously but when it comes to family he definitely wants somewhere to belong." He added that Ash had a good heart, but his upbringing meant that he was a bit of a bad guy.

== Neive Devlin ==
Neive Devlin
- Home and Away character
- Portrayed by: Jolene Anderson
- Duration: 2014–15
- First appearance: 12 November 2014
- Last appearance: 5 February 2015
- Introduced by: Lucy Addario
In-universe information
- Occupation: Record producer

Neive Devlin, played by Jolene Anderson, made her first screen appearance on 12 November 2014. The character and Anderson's casting was announced on 22 June 2014. Anderson has a three-month guest stint with the show and she commented, "I flew in to spend some time with my family and all of a sudden a couple of auditions came up. There was one in Melbourne and I thought 'no, too cold' and then this came up and I thought 'Sydney in winter is not too bad actually' and it's been beautiful." Anderson began filming a week before her casting was announced. Anderson described her character as "a woman in a man's world" and added that Neive's arrival would rock one of the show's established relationships. Anderson later said Neive was "a fun character", which attracted her to the role, and that she liked how well the writers wrote for her. Anderson added, "She is quite blunt and doesn't mind speaking her mind. I think she lacks a filter. It's a kind of energy in a character I have never played."

Neive owns a record label, and when she sees Phoebe Nicholson's (Isabella Giovinazzo) music video, she comes to Summer Bay to hear her sing. Neive takes a phone call during Phoebe's performance and then leaves. When Neive returns she tells Phoebe that she wants to sign her. Phoebe's boyfriend Kyle Braxton (Nic Westaway) tries to negotiate a better contract with Neive, but she tells him she is not open to negotiations. Phoebe decides to reject Neive's offer, but Neive likes Phoebe's attitude and gives her the contract she asked for.

== Others ==
Date(s)	Character	Actor	Circumstances
17 March – 29 July, 1–2 February 2017	Harley Braxton	Various babies Isaac Brown (2017); Zayden Brown (2017)	Harley is Heath Braxton (Dan Ewing) and Jess Lockwood's (Georgia Chara) son. He is delivered by Heath and Nate Cooper (Kyle Pryor) on the beach in Summer Bay. Jess takes Harley back to Melbourne with her, but when she dies, Heath brings Harley back to the Bay to stay with him. His wife, Bianca (Lisa Gormley), struggles to bond with Harley. When Heath tries to cheer him up with their late son's teddy bear, Bianca snatches it from him. When Heath bring his daughter, Darcy Callahan to meet Harley, she became jealous of Harley, convincing Heath to bring Harley back to his mother. When Heath refuses, Darcy takes Harley with her. Harley became sick and Darcy calls Heath, who he, Brax and Bianca later found. Harley was taken to hospital after that. When it seems like the Braxtons are a target, Bianca offers to care for Harley and she finally bonds with him. Harley, Heath and Darcy later depart the Bay and move to the city with Bianca. When Heath and Bianca return to the Bay in 2017, they bring Harley with them. He cuts his hand on a broken seashell and Mason Morgan tends to the injury. Harley later departed Summer Bay with Bianca, Heath and Darcy.
27 March–23 October, 25 August 2016 – 21 March 2017	Eloise "Elly" Page	Darcey Wilson	Eloise is Matt Page's (Alec Snow) younger sister. Sasha Bezmel (Demi Harman) meets Eloise when she comes to check up on Matt, who is looking after her. After Eloise and Matt's father goes back to prison, a neighbour contacts the authorities to take Eloise into care. Matt takes her to the diner and Sasha looks after them. She convinces Matt to let Eloise go into care, as it will be better for them both. Eloise's father, Gray, comes to Summer Bay and takes her out of her foster home for the day, so she can spend time with him and Matt. Gray is later arrested for taking Eloise without permission, and she is returned to the care of her aunt. A couple of years later, Elly runs away to the Bay, where she begs Matt to let her stay with him and Roo Stewart. Elly starts at Summer Bay High, but struggles with her studies due to dyslexia. Evelyn MacGuire becomes her tutor and Elly initially refuses her help, and lies to Matt that Evie left her. She later apologises and accepts Evie's help with her homework. She befriends Raffy Morrison and they try to set Matt and Evie up on a date, but Evie tells Elly that she likes Matt as a brother. Matt and Evie begin dating. When Evie is offered a job in Vietnam, Matt decides that he and Elly should be with her, but Elly refuses to go. Matt and Evie tell Elly that they want to be her guardians, and she agrees to go to Vietnam. They leave the Bay after Matt and Evie hold a ceremonial wedding.
1 April	Walkerby	Nick Grimshaw	The walkerby bumps into Heath Braxton (Dan Ewing), who then has a go at him. Darryl Braxton (Steve Peacocke) also gets in the walkerby's face.
1 April	UK Celebrity	Eliza Doolittle	Ricky Sharpe (Bonnie Sveen) becomes Doolittle's official photographer for her upcoming promotional tour.
1 April	Security Guard	Derek Lea	The Security Guard stops Darryl Braxton (Steve Peacocke) from trying to talk to Ricky Sharpe (Bonnie Sveen), while she is photographing Eliza Doolittle. Brax punches him and takes off after Ricky.
2–3 April	Dr Matthews	Huw Higginson	Dr Matthews treats Darryl Braxton (Steve Peacocke) when he is brought in following a car accident. He becomes worried when Brax suffers a seizure and urges Nurse Tennyson (Danielle King) to find his next of kin. When Casey Braxton arrive, he tells Dr Matthews that Brax hit his head a couple of years ago and needed surgery. Dr Matthews then orders an MRI.
2–3 April	Nurse Tennyson	Danielle King	Nurse Tennyson works with Dr Matthews (Huw Higginson) to find out who Darryl Braxton (Steve Peacocke) is and what is wrong with him. Tennyson later informs Brax's brother, Casey (Lincoln Younes), that Brax has a broken leg and has experienced a seizure. Tennyson helps to stabilise Brax after he has a cardiac arrest.
2 April	Poisoned Diner	Ryan Bennett	After eating Chris Harrington's (Johnny Ruffo) mushroom risotto, the diner collapses and is taken to the hospital, where his condition deteriorates rapidly.
10 April	Docs Worker	Cheryl Ward	The Docs Worker takes Eloise Page Darcey Wilson into care, after her father is jailed.
8 May–10 June	Mark Nicholson	Steve Rodgers	Mark is Phoebe Nicholson's father and a lawyer. He meets Kyle and thinks his surname is Bennett, but soon finds out that Kyle has changed it to Braxton. Mark does a background check on Kyle and learns about Kyle kidnapping Casey Braxton two years earlier and tries to get Phoebe to leave him. Mark then gives Kyle $50,000 to leave Phoebe alone and he tries to reject it.
8 July–25 August	Mitch Todd	Matthew Pearce	Mitch bullies Oscar MacGuire while they complete community service together.
18 August–7 November	Cody Dalton	Aaron Glenane	Cody follows Casey Braxton to the local gym, where he threatens to harm Casey and Denny Miller, if Casey does not tell them where Andy Barrett is. After leaving the gym, the group go to Casey's home and kidnap Andy's brother, Josh, and Evelyn MacGuire. Cody takes them to the farmhouse and calls Andy to tell him what he has done. Andy later turns up and after he gives Cody money, Cody, Jim and Boris leave.
18–19 August	Jim Stone	John Harding	Jim and Boris are part of Cody Dalton's crew. They threaten to harm Casey Braxton and Denny Miller, if Casey does not tell them where Andy Barrett is. After leaving the gym, the group go to Casey's home and kidnap Josh Barrett and Evelyn MacGuire.
18 August	Boris Struik	Nathan Waring	Jim and Boris are part of Cody Dalton's crew. They threaten to harm Casey Braxton and Denny Miller, if Casey does not tell them where Andy Barrett is. After leaving the gym, the group go to Casey's home and kidnap Josh Barrett and Evelyn MacGuire.
25 September–21 October	Tyson Lee	Ben Bennett	Tyson is a bully at Summer Bay High student, who bullies VJ Patterson and teased him about the video of Zac MacGuire and Vj's mother Leah Patterson-Baker kissing. Tyson fakes a head injury to get VJ into trouble, Sophie Taylor suspends him. Tyson and his friends later kidnap VJ, tied him up to a tree and left him at the bushes. The police interrogates Tyson for VJ's disappearance and Tyson denies them for kidnapping him. Leah asked him where VJ was, but Tyson refuses to tells her. At the beach, Leah tries to ask him again, but Tyson still refuses, until Darryl Braxton force him to tell Leah and Tyson tells her that he thought kidnapping VJ is meant to be a joke. Tyson was later arrested and Sophie expelled him from Summer Bay High.
9–30 October	Gray Page	Craig Ball	After he gets out of rehab, Gray comes to Summer Bay to see his son, Matt. He is furious that his family have been split up and he hits Matt. Matt gets him a caravan to stay in and buys him some food. Gray manipulates Matt into staying with him, instead of letting him studying for his HSC. Matt's girlfriend, Sasha Bezmel, worries about Gray's influence on Matt.
23–28 October	Keith Pots	Drayton Morley	Keith meets Spencer Harrington at the Surf Club, and they chat about the area. When Spencer turns up at the local motel to meet his internet date Amy, Keith greets him and explains that Amy is his daughter. He wanted to meet Spencer first to make sure he was who he said he was. Spencer waits for Amy in the motel room, but he soon realises she is not coming. Keith shuts the door and he tries to touch Spencer, who punches him. Keith speaks to the police and Spencer is charged with assault. Spencer later confronts Keith in the hospital and gives a statement to the police.
23 October	Magistrate Gail McCarthy	Sarah Woods	Gail comes to Marilyn Chambers and John Palmer's house to finalise their adoption of Jett James.
12–13 November	Monique Wu	Grace Palmer	Monique and her friends are invited to Angelo's by Chris Harrington. Monique talks to Chris's brother Spencer, but has to leave when Chris upsets one of her friends. Chris later invites Monique to a party and she turns up to see Spencer. Spencer initially tells Monique that he is not interested in her romantically, but they later have sex.
28 November–16 March 2015	Sam Kennedy	Wade Briggs	Sam is a barman, who helps out Darryl Braxton and Martin Ashford when they come looking for Dean Sanderson and Ash's sister. Sam later kills Dean and Brax is arrested for the crime. Brax and Ash return to try and convince Sam to own up to killing Dean. Sam is brought to Summer Bay for Brax's court case. Brax's lawyer brings up Sam's beating at the hands of Dean as a possible motive, but Sam counters by telling the court that Brax and Ash were looking to get some money back from Dean. Brax is sentenced to 20 years for Dean's murder. It is later revealed that Sam confessed to killing Dean, resulting in Brax's freedom.
28 November–1 December	Dean Sanderson	Kevin Kiernan-Molloy	Darryl Braxton and Martin Ashford come looking for Dean, as they want to know where they can find his girlfriend, and Ash's sister, Billie. Dean tries to run away, but Ash and Brax catch him. Dean claims that Billie took off and he has not seen her since. Brax later follows Dean to a mine and finds him digging up proceeds from a robbery. Brax beats Dean and takes the money. Sam Kennedy later turns up and kills Dean.
10 December–2 February 2015	Grant Barnes	Adam Gray	Grant is Neive Devlin's assistant. He drugs Phoebe Nicholson at her record launch, under Neive's orders. He then knocks Andy Barrett unconscious and locks him and Martin Ashford in the basement. Grant attempts to undress and have sex with Phoebe in front of a camera, but Andy, Ash and Matt Page turn up and save Phoebe. Neive later fires Grant.
