= Life After Fighting =

2024 martial arts action film

- Directed by: Bren Foster
- Written by: Bren Foster
- Music by: Jason Fernandez
- Production company: Broken Yellow
- Release date: 2024
- Country: Australia
- Language: English
- Budget: $350,000
- Box office: $5,686

Life After Fighting is a 2024 Australian martial arts film written, starring and directed by Bren Foster.

== Plot ==
A martial arts instructor is confronted with the disappearance of two of his students, leading him into a direct confrontation with a group of international child traffickers.

== Cast ==
- Bren Foster as Alex Faulkner
- Cassie Howarth as Samantha Hathaway
- Luke Ford as Victor Dimov
- Annabelle Stephenson as Julie Creylan
- Arielle Jean Foster as Violet Creylan
- Anthony Nassif as Terry Dimov

== Reception ==
Film School Rejects said, "Life After Fighting is the real deal, and so is Foster. He’s had a healthy career on television, but the film will leave you wondering why he hasn’t been given a shot like this before.". The film won the 2025 Vulture Stunt Award for "Best Fight"
