= Cassie Howarth =

Australian actor

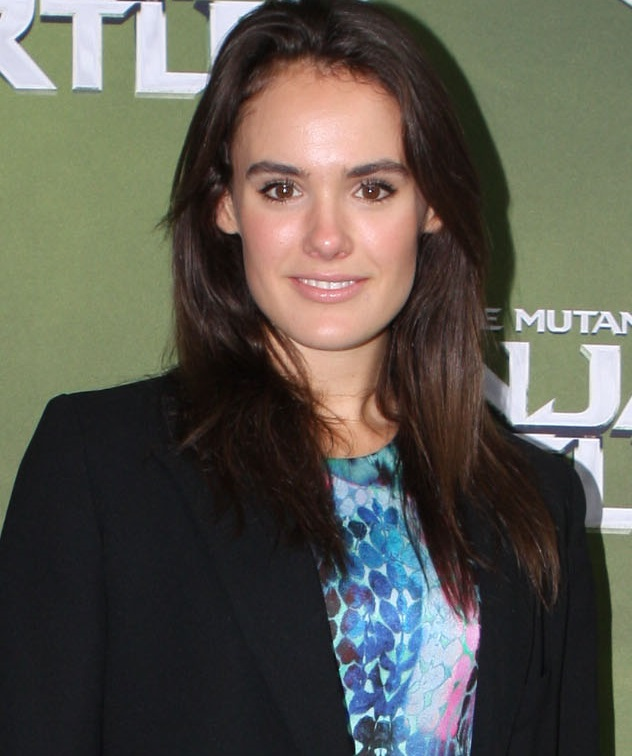
- Howarth in 2013
- Born: 1985 or 1986 (age 40–41); Avoca Beach, New South Wales, Australia
- Occupation: Actress
- Years active: 2010–present

Cassie Howarth is an Australian actress, known for her role as Hannah Wilson in the soap opera Home and Away from 2013 until 2016. Howarth also played Dayna Rollins in the sci-fi television series Bar Karma in 2011, and has had guest roles in Packed to the Rafters and NCIS: Sydney. Her film roles include Deranged High (2010), 2 Graves in the Desert (2020), and Life After Fighting (2024). She has also appeared in several theatre productions, including The Crucible and The Pass.

== Early life ==
Howarth and her two brothers are from Avoca Beach on the Central Coast. She attended the University of Sydney and received a Bachelor of Arts in Liberal Studies. She lived in New York City for three years and trained in acting at the Atlantic Acting School and the Stella Adler Conservatory. She also trained at the Actors Centre Australia.

Howarth has coeliac disease.

== Career ==
Howarth made her screen acting debut in the 2010 comedy film Deranged High, followed by the lead role of waitress Dayna Rollins in the Current TV sci-fi series Bar Karma. The 12 episode series was community-developed, with fans able to vote on storylines, art direction, and the soundtrack. Howarth had a guest role in Packed to the Rafters in 2013, and appeared in several theatre productions, including The Crucible, Happy Hour and The Circus.

In 2013, Howarth joined the main cast of soap opera Home and Away as Hannah Wilson. She was introduced alongside Philippa Northeast and Jake Speer, who played her character's niece and nephew. respectively. Howarth described her character as "a strong, determined woman who will fight fiercely for her family, but needs to feel loved as she has a fear of being alone." Howrath moved to Sydney to be closer to the Seven Network studios and shared an apartment with her schoolfriend and newsreader Leanne Jones. Howarth's character was involved in various notable storylines, including extracting her family from a cult, a romance with Andy Barrett (played by Tai Hara), and paralysis. Howarth departed the serial in May 2016, after her character was killed-off in a Caravan Park explosion storyline.

After leaving Home and Away, Howarth starred in the Lifetime television thriller film A Deadly Price for Her Pretty Face as Amanda Archer, feature film 2 Graves in the Desert alongside Michael Madsen and William Baldwin, and the action-comedy series Bondi Slayer. In February 2021, Howarth appeared in a production of John Donnelly's The Pass at The Reginald Theatre in the Seymour Centre, alongside Ben Chapple and Deng Deng.

Howarth appears in the first season of The Twelve. She made a guest appearance in NCIS: Sydney in 2023, followed by a role in the 2024 martial arts thriller film Life After Fighting with Bren Foster.

== Filmography ==
Film and television performances
Year	Title	Role	Notes
2010	Deranged High	Marissa	Feature film
2011	Bar Karma	Dayna Rollins	Main cast
2013	Packed to the Rafters	Dee	Episode: "Head vs. Heart"
2013–2016	Home and Away	Hannah Wilson	Series regular
2020	A Deadly Price for Her Pretty Face	Amanda Archer	Also known as Model Citizen
2020	2 Graves in the Desert	Blake	Feature film
2020	Bondi Slayer	Cass	Episode: "Home and a Slay"
2022	The Twelve	Jane	Miniseries
2023	NCIS: Sydney	Allison	Episode: "Blonde Ambition"
2024	Life After Fighting	Samantha Hathaway	Feature film
