= Zac MacGuire =

- Home and Away character
- Portrayed by: Charlie Clausen
- Duration: 2013–2017
- First appearance: 22 January 2013
- Last appearance: 25 May 2017
- Introduced by: Lucy Addario
In-universe information
- Occupation: Prison education officer Teacher and principal at Summer Bay High
- Brothers: Ethan MacGuire
- Wife: Leah Patterson-Baker (2015–2017)
- Stepsons: VJ Patterson
- Nephews: Oscar MacGuire
- Nieces: Denny Miller; Evelyn MacGuire

Zac MacGuire is a fictional character from the Australian soap opera Home and Away, played by Charlie Clausen. The actor successfully auditioned for the role in 2012 and was told he had won the role on his birthday. Clausen began filming almost immediately and was initially contracted for three years. Clausen had to give up recording his podcast TOFOP at Seven Network's request, as it was deemed a conflict of interest. He made his first screen appearance on 22 January 2013.

Zac is portrayed as being honest, strong, non-judgmental and someone who lives his life to the fullest. Clausen said he and Zac shared some similarities, which he liked. Zac was introduced as Natalie Davison's (Catherine Mack) former boyfriend. As he was the local prison's education officer, Natalie asked Zac to watch out for new inmate Casey Braxton (Lincoln Younes). This brought Zac and Natalie back together and they rekindled their relationship, which had ended when Zac was sent to prison in his twenties.

After he started teaching at the high school, Zac almost lost his job when student Holly Chapman (Sacha Vivian-Riding) developed an intense crush on him and then accused him of trying to start an inappropriate relationship with her. Clausen said the storyline was the most interesting that he had ever worked on. Exploration of the character's background began when his family were introduced in late 2013 and Zac briefly became romantically involved with his sister-in-law Hannah Wilson (Cassie Howarth). Zac later married Leah Patterson-Baker (Ada Nicodemou) and learned that he had fathered a son. After the breakdown of his marriage, Zac departed the Bay on 25 May 2017.

== Casting ==
Actor Charlie Clausen successfully auditioned for the role of Zac in 2012 and started filming almost immediately. He was initially contracted with the show for three years. Clausen was forced to stop recording his comedy podcast TOFOP at the request of Seven Network, as it was a conflict of interest. A TV Week reporter noted that the role of Zac marked something of a return to acting for Clausen. The character and Clausen's casting was announced on 13 January 2013. Of joining the show, Clausen commented "I'm very excited to join the cast of Home and Away. I found out I got the role on my birthday and I couldn't think of a better gift. It's a fantastic opportunity for any actor and I've been made to feel really welcome by the cast, crew and production team. I'm looking forward to 2013 and beyond."

== Development ==
=== Backstory and introduction ===
In his fictional backstory, Zac was convicted and sent to prison for cultivating and selling marijuana in his twenties. Zac's stint in prison cost him his university girlfriend and "the love of his life" Natalie Davison (Catherine Mack). Mack commented that Zac and Natalie were really in love and thought they would be together forever, until Zac was convicted and they broke up. They had not seen each other since university, until Casey Braxton (Lincoln Younes) was sent to prison, and Natalie contacted Zac, the prison's education officer, and asked him to look out for Casey. Casey was surprised to learn of Zac's connection to Natalie, but overlooked it when he received a beating from a fellow inmate. Younes said that Casey realises that having a friend on the inside was not a bad thing. Zac tried to help Casey out by placing him in the kitchen, but this brought him into contact with his bully Courtney Freeman (Joshua Brennan) and Casey ended up getting attacked for refusing to help deliver drugs. When Casey's brother and Natalie's ex-boyfriend Darryl Braxton (Steve Peacocke) learned about the beating, he confronted Zac demanding to know why he did not prevent it.

=== Characterisation ===
Clausen said that Zac had "a lot of integrity" despite his past. He continued, "he's a really sort of stand-up guy but he's someone who's had a bit of a shady past and come through that so the benefit of that life experience is he's very non-judgemental, he feels like he can talk to anyone." Clausen also called Zac "a good guy" and said that his mistake ended up dictating every choice he had made since. A writer for the official Home and Away website described Zac as living his life "to the fullest" and loving "deeply and without hesitation." Clausen later branded Zac "an everyman" and thought he was good at providing a contrast to the Braxton family. Clausen also liked that his character was strong and enjoyed the friction between him and other characters. He added that Zac was similar to himself, which he liked and thought it was a challenge to play.

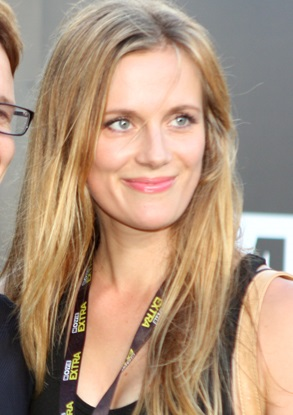
Catherine Mack played Zac's first love interest, Natalie Davison in 2013.

=== Love triangle ===
Shortly after Zac's introduction, he became part of a love triangle with Natalie and Brax. Clausen joked, "the whole Brax, Nat thing, Zac is definitely coming in as that third point of a love triangle. It's my speciality to be honest; I've done quite a few shows where I get brought in as the third point of a love triangle." Following Natalie's decision to end her relationship with Brax, she and Zac shared a kiss. Mack explained that her character was ready to move on and she was curious about Zac, especially as her feelings for him had resurfaced. Mack thought Natalie was better suited to Zac, as she knew everything about him, while Brax was "the bad boy". When Natalie witnessed Brax taking his anger out on Zac, she realised that she wanted to make things work with Zac. Mack said "he's such a great guy, he's a really good human being and she wants to try it. She's still attracted to him." When Zac noticed that Natalie was still involved with Brax and his family, he accused her of "being fixated on her ex". Seeing how upset Natalie was after an argument with Brax, Zac confronted his rival and learned that Natalie was constantly interfering in his problems. Zac was convinced that Natalie was trying to keep Brax in her life, which made Natalie see that she needed to cut ties with the Braxtons. Mack left the show in June 2013 and Natalie departed Summer Bay to sort out "some unfinished business with her family".

=== Holly Chapman ===
When Zac took a job at Summer Bay High, student Holly Chapman (Sacha Vivian-Riding) developed a crush on him, which almost cost him his job when he rejected her advances. Zac was initially "unfazed" by Holly's obvious flirting towards him and put it down to normal teenage girl behaviour. Clausen explained to Erin Miller of TV Week reporter that Zac thought it was harmless, while Holly believed herself to be more suited to Zac than boys her own age. As Zac was not secure in his new job, he did not want to be seen creating trouble and tried to handle the situation on his own. However, Holly became more forward in her advances towards him, forcing Zac to tell her that he was not interested and her actions were inappropriate. Clausen said "he blindly goes into this thinking he can handle it, but he underestimates the strength of where she is coming from. She is so committed to making this work, and this becomes a very tough situation for him." At first Holly was embarrassed, but her behaviour became more manic and Clausen called her "delusional". Clausen said the storyline was the most interesting that he had worked on because of the twists.

When Holly was confronted by Bianca Scott (Lisa Gormley) about a graphic essay she handed in to Zac, she admitted that she had feelings for Zac and he felt the same about her. Zac later found Holly in tears on the beach and tried to comfort her, but she took it to mean something more and tried to kiss him. Clausen called it "a real wake-up call" for Zac and he quickly backed off. Hurt at being rejected, Holly then told Bianca that Zac had tried to initiate an inappropriate relationship with her. Bianca then suspended Zac from his job and an investigation was started. The situation was made worse when the local newspaper printed a story about Holly's allegations. The storyline came to an end when Holly threatened to throw herself off a cliff, unless Zac declared his love for her. Clausen likened the situation to defusing a bomb, stating that Zac was aware that Holly was fragile and that he had to tread carefully. He was also under pressure to say the right thing, as one wrong move could have seen Holly jump. Clausen said, "Prior to this, Holly has shown she will go to extreme lengths to get his attention. He can't afford to treat it lightly." Clausen believed that Zac saying the words Holly wanted to hear would help in the short term, as it got her way from the cliff, but may have done "more harm than good" in the long term.

=== Introduction of family ===
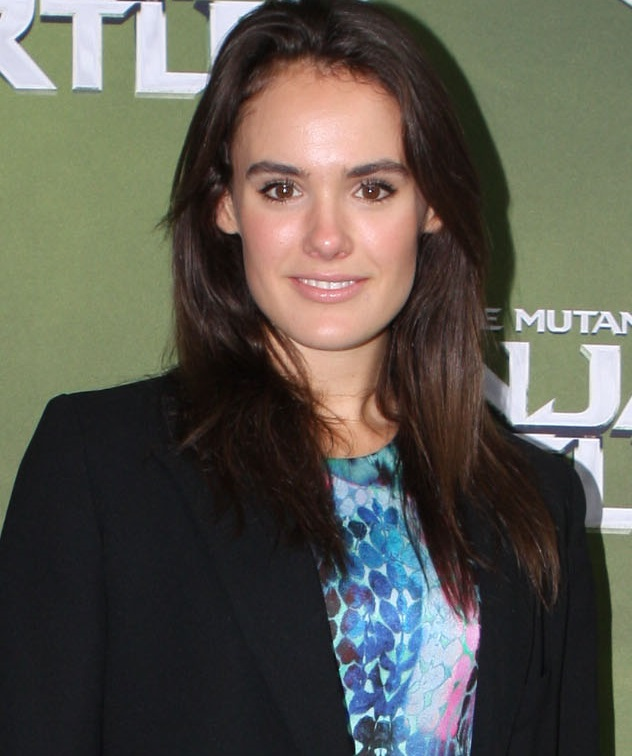
Zac's sister-in-law Hannah Wilson played by Cassie Howarth (pictured) was introduced along with their niece and nephew in late 2013.

In August 2013, further exploration of Zac's background began when his family were introduced. His sister-in-law Hannah Wilson (Cassie Howarth) came to Zac to ask for his help in rescuing their niece and nephew, Evelyn (Philippa Northeast) and Oscar (Jake Speer), from a cult that they have been inducted into by Zac's brother Ethan (Matt Minto). Howarth told TV Week's Jessica Grubb that Hannah and Zac had not seen each other in years, as Zac was estranged from his brother. Hannah had been helping to look after the twins following their mother's death. Zac initially thought Hannah was overreacting, but accompanied her on a visit to see his brother. Howarth observed that Zac did not see the cult for what it was straight away, as Ethan passed it off as a group enlightenment camp.

When Zac finally realised that Ethan was a member of a cult, he decided to team up with the Braxton brothers to help rescue Oscar and Evelyn. Zac knew that the lifestyle of the cult was not healthy for the twins and that they were not happy being there anymore. Nic Westaway, who plays Kyle Braxton, commented "Over the time they have known Zac, the Braxtons have learned to trust his judgement. If he says his brother is bad news, they are going to go with that and try and get the kids out." Zac and the Braxtons had to fight their way out of the camp, but managed to rescue the twins and brought them to Summer Bay. Ethan later followed them to the Bay and was killed during a bomb explosion at the local hospital. Following his funeral, his secret daughter, Denny (Jessica Grace Smith) arrived in town to get to know her family.

After a few months living with Hannah and the twins, Zac developed feelings for his sister-in-law and they tried to start a relationship. However, they decided to put it on hold for the sake of the twins. While Hannah was able to move on, Zac struggled to be around her and watch as she developed a romance with Andy Barrett (Tai Hara). Clausen said, "Zac never thought Hannah would be looking elsewhere for romance or that anyone else had come on the scene. It's a blow to his ego!" When Zac and Hannah stopped communicating, Zac looked through her phone and Hannah caught him. Clausen tried to defend his character's actions, saying that he did not mean to snoop, but Hannah had a right to be angry. While he was cooling off, Zac became depressed and regretful about what had happened, as he still had feelings for Hannah. After running into Bianca, Zac shared a "serious flirtation" with her and they ended up having a one-night stand.

=== Relationship with Leah Patterson-Baker ===
In September 2014, Zac began a relationship with his friend Leah Patterson-Baker (Ada Nicodemou). Nicodemou first hinted at a romance between Zac and Leah the previous year, saying that she had received many comments from viewers asking when the characters were going to get together. She also said "Leah was initially quite standoffish with the character of Zac, as she didn't quite know how to take him. Now they've become really good mates". After Zac and Leah became closer, Leah developed a crush on Zac and they shared a moment while they took part in a high school fundraiser. When student Matt Page (Alec Snow) realised that Leah liked Zac, he tricked her into kissing him by telling her that Zac had not sold any kisses at the kissing booth. When Leah initially refuses, Matt joked that she must really like Zac, so she kissed him to prove Matt wrong. But she became embarrassed and quickly left. A show spokesperson noted that up until that point, Zac took his friendship with Leah for granted and that it was up to him to decide whether they became romantically involved.

When asked what Zac thought about the kiss, Clausen told Stephen Downie from TV Week that he had not really thought of Leah in a romantic way before, so it came as a bit of a surprise to him. The actor explained that they would make a good couple, as they have lots in common. Clausen said, "They are both people who have had some heartbreak and trust issues in the past. They both have good senses of humour, they're smart and they work at the same school." Downie thought Leah would be "a refreshing change" for Zac, as he tends to fall for girls that like the bad boys. After starting a relationship, Leah and Zac tried to keep it a secret out of respect for her son VJ Patterson (Matt Little), who Leah wanted to tell in her own time. However, Matt secretly filmed Leah and Zac kissing and ended up showing the footage to the students, which left VJ "humiliated".

The following year, Zac decided to propose to Leah. Clausen explained, "For Zac, this proposal is about not wanting to waste any more time. He and Leah have been through so much. Leah's had two close calls, but they've weathered the worst of the storm. Now Zac wants to show her how much he loves her." As he asked VJ for his permission, he was overheard by Chris Harrington (Johnny Ruffo). Chris convinced Zac to stage an elaborate proposal during the surf carnival on the beach. Clausen said Zac initially wanted to do something simple, but he just got caught up in Chris's plans. Leah's friends led her to the beach, where she found Zac with an engagement ring asking her to be his wife. Leah turned down the proposal, but later accepted a more simple one at home.

Shortly before the wedding, the police informed Zac that the body of his niece Denny Miller (Jessica-Grace Smith) had been found. Zac and Leah made the "difficult decision" to cancel the wedding. However, Evie points out that Denny would not have wanted to be the reason they did not get married, and Zac and Leah decided to hold the ceremony in the grounds of Summer Bay House. VJ walked his mother down the aisle, while Oscar, Matt and Zac's son Hunter King (Scott Lee) were Zac's groomsmen. The ceremony was interrupted by Zac's former girlfriend Charlotte King (Erika Heynatz), who "lets rip" at the guests. Clausen told Sarah Ellis of Inside Soap, "She really tries her best to ruin the day, but Zac and Hunter manage to get her out of there. Zac and Leah eventually tie the knot – nothing will stop them from getting married right now!" During the reception, Kat Chapman (Pia Miller) informed Denny's family that Charlotte was her killer. Clausen said Zac's feelings of guilt and anger turned the happiest day of his life into the "most terrible". He believed that if it was not for him, Charlotte would never have come to the Bay. Charlotte was shot and killed that same day, leading to a whodunit storyline. Clausen added that Zac was capable of her murder.

=== Secret son ===
After Zac's ex-girlfriend Charlotte King moved to the Bay, her teenage son Hunter King also turned up and it emerged that Zac was his father. Hunter eventually told Zac his identity during a community fundraising banquet for Leah, whose house was burnt down. Lee explained that Hunter could no longer stand to see Zac with his "other family" and felt invisible, so he wanted to be noticed when he told Zac the truth. Zac was unaware that he had fathered a child with Charlotte and was "gobsmacked" by the revelation. He demanded answers from Charlotte and struggled to understand why she had kept such a secret from him, causing him to reject Hunter. Lee called Zac's reaction "a massive slap in the face", as he had been waiting his whole life to meet his father.

Hunter's presence later caused Zac and Leah's relationship to become strained. Hunter made it clear to Leah that he wanted Zac to himself and when she voiced her concerns about him, Zac refused to believe his son was up to no good. When Hunter pretended to drown during a trip to the beach, his actions caused Zac to stand Leah up. Nicodemou told an Inside Soap columnist, "After Leah hears that Hunter didn't want to go to hospital, she thinks it was just a plot to get his mum and dad back together." Zac was upset when Leah accused Hunter, as he believed she should trust him. Realising that there would be a time where Zac would have to choose between her and Hunter, Leah decided to make the decision for him and ended their engagement.

=== Departure ===
In 2016, Clausen's management updated his online CV to indicate that the actor had finished filming on Home and Away. In May 2017, the character's departure was confirmed. Clausen later admitted to having "mixed feelings" about leaving the show, but said he thought it was the right time to go. He liked Zac's exit storyline, commenting "I couldn't have asked for a better exit... I was happy with the work I'd done – and the storyline wrapped up nicely." He added that he would be tempted to make a return in the future. In the lead up to his departure, Zac and Leah's marriage ends, after he admits to having sex with Samantha Webster (Cheree Cassidy). As they are finalising their divorce, Zac then learns that he is not Hunter's biological father. Zac "breaks down" while talking to Evie during a video call, as he struggles with what has happened. Although he has been offered a job elsewhere, Zac decides to accept Evie's offer to live with her and Matt in Vietnam.

== Storylines ==
Zac's former girlfriend, Natalie Davison, gets in contact and asks Zac to look out for Casey Braxton when he is admitted to the Crestview Correctional Centre. Zac befriends Casey and provokes him into punching him to earn the respect of other inmates. Zac tries to help Casey when he is targeted by another inmate, but Casey ends up getting attacked, which angers his brother Darryl. Zac tells Natalie he still has feelings for her, and they begin dating. Zac helps Casey to get an early release and arranges for Jamie Sharpe (Hugo Johnstone-Burt) to be transferred, which costs him his job. Zac confronts Natalie when he believes she still has feelings for Brax, and she vows to cut ties with the Braxtons. Zac successfully applies for a teaching position at Summer Bay High. On his first day, Zac takes his class off school property and is reprimanded by principal Bianca Scott.

Zac is liked by the students and Holly Chapman develops a crush on him. Holly flirts repeatedly with Zac, but he dismisses her advances which upsets her. Natalie warns Zac about Holly's behaviour, before she leaves Summer Bay to find her mother. Holly later claims that Zac sexually harassed her and Zac is suspended while Bianca investigates. Holly threatens to throw herself off a cliff, but Zac manages to stop her. Bianca is fired after she speaks out in defence of Zac, but a student protest sees her reinstated. Zac develops feeling for Bianca, but when he learns that she almost postponed her wedding, he apologises and makes Bianca realises how much she loves her fiancé. Zac's sister-in-law, Hannah Wilson, comes to the Bay asking for Zac's help in rescuing their niece and nephew from a cult that Zac's brother, Ethan, has got them involved in.

Zac visits the camp and is reunited with Ethan. When he realises that his nephew, Oscar, hates the camp, he gives him his phone number and tells him to call if he wants to talk. Oscar is later beaten and Zac asks the Braxton brothers to help him rescue the twins. After getting them away from the cult, Zac and Ricky Sharpe (Bonnie Sveen) attempt to de-program Evelyn. However, she manages to escape and returns to her father. Oscar struggles without his sister and having Zac as a father figure, but eventually Evelyn returns and the family move into the farmhouse. Zac and Hannah become attracted to each other. The twins disappear and Ethan is killed in a bomb explosion at the hospital. Zac and Hannah realise that Ethan kidnapped the twins and they find them in a shipping container. Zac and Hannah decide to put their relationship on hold, and Zac later learns Hannah is dating Andy Barrett.

Zac drifts apart from Hannah and begins drinking. When Oscar finds Zac passed out in the back of his car, Oscar opts to drive him home. Oscar accidentally hits Tamara Kingsley (Kelly Paterniti) when he takes his eyes off the road, and is not aware of what he has done until later when Zac believes it was his fault. Zac tries to protect Oscar by taking the blame, but Oscar eventually confesses to the police. Zac decides to move in with Leah and she kisses him at a school event. They begin dating, but decide to keep their relationship a secret from Leah's son VJ to protect him. However, Matt Page films them kissing and shows the footage to the other students and VJ. When Zac finds out VJ has a tattoo, he agrees to keep it from Leah, but she is angry with him when she does find out. Zac tries to stay out of VJ's life, but Leah asks him for help when VJ plans to leave school.

When VJ acts up, Matt tells Zac that VJ probably feels like he has lost Zac as a friend. Zac talks to VJ and tells him he can talk to him anytime, but Leah has the final say. After Leah is seriously injured in a bus crash, Zac is forced to take care of VJ and they both struggle. They are later told that Leah may never wake from her coma. Zac thinks about giving up on her, but feels guilty when she wakes up. Leah learns that she has an aneurysm and Zac and VJ try to convince her to have the surgery, but she refuses. She then goes missing in the bush, and after she is found, agrees to have the surgery. Zac proposes to Leah, but she turns him down. She later changes her mind and proposes to him, which he accepts. Zac's ex-girlfriend Charlotte King becomes the new biology teacher at the school. When Leah's house catches fire, Zac goes inside to rescue Oscar and Matt. Billie Ashford (Tessa de Josselin) also goes inside to help to him. The house is destroyed and everyone moves into Summer Bay House. During a fundraiser for the family, Charlotte's son Hunter turns up and reveals that Zac is his father.

Charlotte dies after being shot and Zac becomes the prime suspect. He is arrested and charged with her murder. Morag Bellingham (Cornelia Frances) defends Zac, but he is sent to prison on remand. He is attacked by some of the other prisoners and stabbed, despite Tank Snelgrove's (Reece Milne) intervention. Morag finds evidence proving Zac is innocent and he is released.

When an explosion happens at the Caravan Park during the hospital fundraiser, Oscar suffers a severe head injury and dies in hospital. Hannah dies soon afterwards, causing Evie to undergo a lot of grief. Zac then consoles his niece through her pain and gives a eulogy at Hannah and Oscar's joint funeral. After he finds out Tank was involved in causing the explosion, he heads to the hospital and lashes out at Tank, having to be restrained by Leah. After Greg steps down as principal, Zac becomes acting principal again. When he finds out that Hunter altered his exam results, he initially puts the blame on Hunter despite constant claims from Hunter that Tabitha Ford (Eliza Scanlen) framed him. Hunter is proven innocent when his girlfriend Olivia comes up with evidence that Tabitha altered the exam paper.

When Tabitha sets up a fake Twitter profile to humiliate Olivia, Zac comes to Olivia's defence and tells the other students that Olivia has been set up. When a small fire breaks out at the school, Zac initially suspects Tabitha is responsible, but Matt later reveals that his sister Ellie caused the fire. When Hunter plans to buy a stolen exam paper, Zac immediately launches an investigation into who he tried to buy it from. Zac then acts as chauffeur at his stepson VJ's wedding to Billie. Zac later goes to meet his book editor Samantha Webster (Cheree Cassidy) at Salt, under the pretence he is meeting a teacher. After a run in with Ash and being seen with Sam by Marilyn Chambers, who thinks he is having an affair, Zac comes clean to Leah and tells her he is not cheating. Leah then meets Sam but tension arouses when she finds out Zac told Sam about her history of troubled marriages. Due to Leah's discomfort with Sam, Zac calls the meeting off. During a later meeting, Sam attempts to kiss Zac who resists. Sam tries harder and disrobes in front of Zac. Zac turns her down and keeps the encounter from Leah.

Sam rejects Zac's book and Zac believes it's just a ploy for Sam to get back at him for turning her down. However, he soon realizes the truth that the publishers, and even Leah, are not interested in his book, Leah herself not being impressed after reading it. Sam then leaves the bay to move onto another novelist. Zac books an anniversary meal for him and Leah, who is in the city, at Salt, but Leah never turns up. Bianca, who is back in the bay with Heath, has a drink with him and tries to kiss him afterwards, Zac again resists. When Leah returns from the city. Zac keeps the encounter with Bianca to himself but it soon becomes common knowledge after Heath finds out and punches him.

Zac attends Billie's funeral after she dies of untreateable cancer. Sam returns to the bay a few weeks later, much to Zac and Leah's annoyance. She constantly tries to win Zac over and even tries to kiss him and question the state his marriage is in, but fails nonetheless. Zac asks Leah for support, but she constantly pushes him away. Zac, overwhelmed and frustrated, goes to Sam to talk with her, culminating in them having a one-night stand. Zac feels guilty after the encounter and keeps it from Leah and VJ. However, the truth soon comes to mind when Matt eventually finds out. Zac then goes away from the bay to attend a teacher's conference. At the same time, Evie and Matt organise their wedding, which Zac can't make it to. However he makes it just after the ceremony and hands Evie the rings of her deceased parents. Evie and Matt leave soon after.

Zac can't handle his guilt and admits to Leah that he cheated. She then isolates herself from him and tells him not to tell VJ while she is away at her parents' house. Zac tries to make amends by phoning Leah but she hangs up every time. He tries emailing her, and she replies that she wants him to leave her alone as he cheated. Zac goes out shopping for dinner that night and VJ sees Leah's reply whilst he is out, knowing now that Zac cheated on his mother. VJ, like Leah, isolates himself from Zac and demands he moves out to the Caravan Park. Leah returns from her trip and Zac tries to make amends and he and Leah end up kissing. However, Leah breaks off after she sees the way he looks at her and demands he moves out of the house permanently. Zac rents a caravan and ends up having a chat with John Palmer (Shane Withington), whose court trial is just days away. John gives some advice on how to make amends with Leah. After VJ sees that Zac is at the Caravan Park and not with his mother, he is convinced Zac no longer cares about Leah and takes a punch at Zac, but John restrains VJ before he can do any serious damage.

Zac tries to support Leah when the courts decide to give custody of Billie's daughter Luc to Ash. Despite his acts of goodwill, Leah is convinced their marriage is at breaking point and files for divorce, much to Zac's shock and disbelief. Zac continually tries to win her back but his attempts prove futile and he fails. After having a chat and a drink with Nate Cooper, Zac ends up drunk and heads over to Leah's. He climbs onto the roof and Roo and Leah watch him in shock. After making a heartwarming speech to Leah that he will always love her, Zac trips and falls from the roof, sustaining near fatal injuries. He is rushed into hospital afterwards and manages to make a full recovery. Hunter visits him whilst he is resting and Zac makes a remark about when he and Charlotte broke up, causing Hunter to question whether Zac is really his father. Zac eventually finds out about the test and reassures Hunter that he is his father by telling him that he and Charlotte were in an on-off relationship around the time of his conception, ridding Hunter of all doubt. Hunter bins the test but curiosity takes him over and he reads it, finding out that Zac is in fact not his father. Zac goes to leave the bay, wanting to take Hunter with him, but Hunter tells him he is not his father and convinces him to just leave the Bay. With his marriage to Leah no longer functional and hit by Hunter not being his son, Zac then leaves for his new teaching post in Vietnam to join Evie and Matt.

== Reception ==
Holly Richards (The West Australian) observed that "Zac looks set to be one of the hottest new arrivals at the Bay". While a writer for TVFIX branded him the show's "newest heart-throb". A Sunday Mail reporter branded Zac "ever helpful" and thought he was "better husband material" for Bianca than Heath Braxton. After Zac turned to alcohol and fell out with his family, a journalist for the Coventry Evening Telegraph observed "Zac's hardly flavour of the month at the moment".
