= Tessa de Josselin =

Australian actress and voiceover artist

- Born: 13 April 1989 (age 37); Narrabeen, New South Wales, Australia
- Occupation: Actress
- Years active: 2012–present

Tessa de Josselin (born 13 April 1989) is a French/Australian actress and voiceover artist. She left her job as an environmental planner to pursue a career in acting. Shortly after joining an acting agency, de Josselin appeared in an episode of Tricky Business and was cast as Samantha "Sam" Hazelton in children's drama In Your Dreams. In 2015, de Josselin appeared as Macy in Ready for This and Anna Conigrave in the feature film Holding the Man. From April 2015, de Josselin began starring in the long-running soap opera Home and Away as Billie Ashford. She departed the cast in 2016 and her last scenes aired in February 2017.

== Early life ==
Tessa de Josselin was born in Narrabeen and attended Manly High School. At 14 she joined the Australian Theatre for Young People, where she received her first acting role in a production of Debra Oswald's Skate. She later enrolled at Sydney University, where she studied a combined arts and environmental sciences degree. She went on to work for the New South Wales Government and two grassroots organisations based in the Northern Beaches. De Josselin has been surfing since she was six years old. She is a member of the North Narrabeen Boardriders team, who compete in the Australian women's Surf Tag Championships. She also has a black belt in Taekwondo.

== Career ==
While working as an environmental planner, de Josselin joined an acting agency. After a guest appearance in Tricky Business, de Josselin was cast in the lead role of Samantha "Sam" Hazelton in the children's drama In Your Dreams. The series is shot in both Australia and Germany, and the second season aired in 2014. De Josselin also appeared in two short films, Drift and Nerds in Love.

In late 2014, de Josselin joined the cast of soap opera Home and Away as Billie Ashford, the younger sister of established character Martin Ashford. She made her first screen appearance on 27 April 2015. De Josselin admitted to a TV Week writer that she had found some of Billie's storylines "challenging", particularity an arc where Billie falsely accused another character of sexual assault. The actress departed the show in 2016 and Billie's exit storyline aired in February 2017.

2015 saw de Josselin make recurring appearances in the teen drama Ready for This as "roller-derby enthusiast" Macy. Macy is also a lesbian, and de Josselin was pleased with the development, commenting that "there aren't many gay roles being written for young adults on commercial tv." De Josselin also appeared as Anna Conigrave in the Neil Armfield directed film Holding the Man, alongside Ryan Corr and Guy Pearce. Following her departure from Home and Away, De Josselin joined the cast of SBS crime thriller Dead Lucky, alongside Rachel Griffiths.

In early 2019, de Josselin was cast in romantic comedy film Paper Champions, directed by Jo-Anne Brechin. De Josselin plays "confident and determined nurse" Holly.

== Filmography ==
Year	Title	Role	Notes
2012	Tricky Business	Krista	Episode: "Secrets and Lies"
2013	Drift	Pele	Short film
2013	Nerds In Love	Jess	Short film
2013–2014	In Your Dreams	Samantha Hazelton	
2015	Holding the Man	Anna Conigrave	Feature film
2015	Ready for This	Macy	
2015–2017	Home and Away	Billie Ashford	Main cast; Seasons 28–30
2018	Dead Lucky	Jess Roberts	
2020	Paper Champions	Holly	Feature film
2021	Mr Inbetween	Karen	Episodes "All I Ever Wanted", "Cut The Crap Princess"
2021	Ke Nui Road	Jenn	Pilot Episode
