= Kyle Pryor =

English actor (b. 1984)

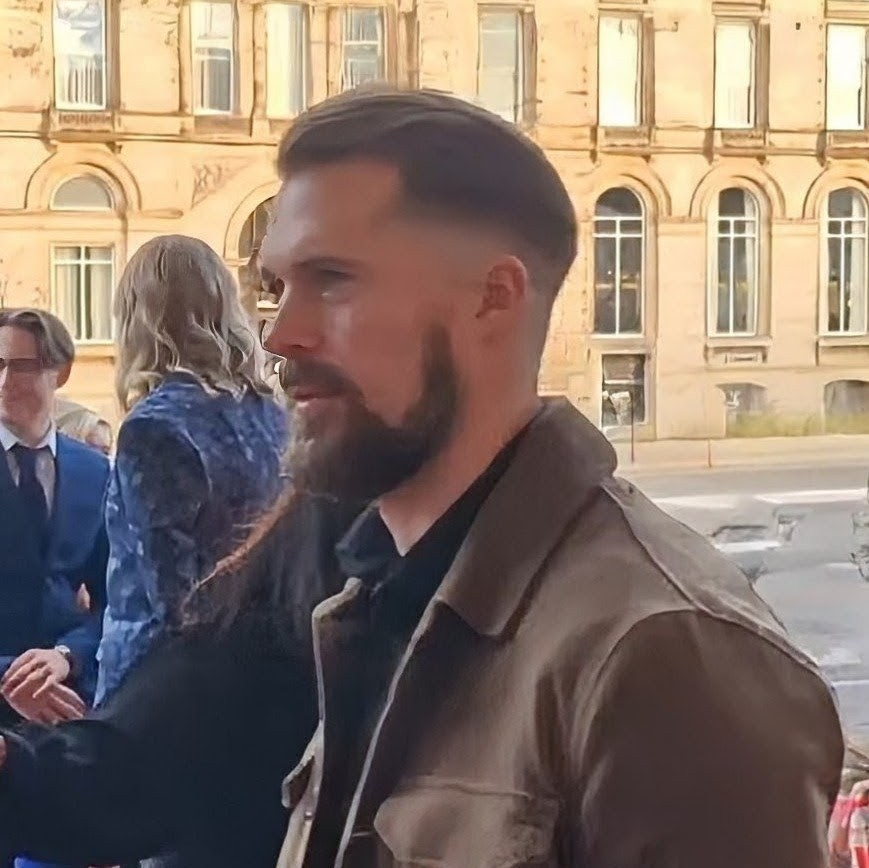
- Born: Kyle Pryor; 10 January 1984 (age 42); Surrey, England, United Kingdom
- Occupation: Actor
- Years active: 2009–present
- Partner: Anna Passey (2019–present)
- Website: kylepryor.com

Kyle Pryor (born 10 January 1984) is a British actor from Surrey, England. He is known for his roles as Nate Cooper in the Australian soap Home and Away and Laurie Shelby in the Channel 4 British soap opera, Hollyoaks. Before these appearances, he was a stunt man on several films including Underworld: Rise of the Lycans. He also acted on several New Zealand–based television dramas, including This Is Not My Life and Go Girls.

== Early life ==
Pryor began training in the Korean martial art of Taekwondo at age 14. He competed in various national competitions, winning the British and English Championships in his weight and grade category. In 2003, he was awarded a 'Distinction' Black Belt.

Between 2003 and 2006, he attended the University of Worcester to complete a Joint Honours Bachelor of Arts in Media and Culture and Sports Science. In late 2011, Pryor received full New Zealand citizenship.

== Career ==
Pryor emigrated to New Zealand in 2006 and he became a stuntman due to his fitness training and martial arts skills on Underworld: Rise of the Lycans in 2009 and The Warrior's Way in 2010.

He got his first major acting role as Marcus in the series Spartacus: Blood and Sand in 2010. He later starred in This Is Not My Life, a local New Zealand production, and in the ABC series Legend of the Seeker.

In 2012, the actor moved to Australia, auditioning for the role of Kyle Braxton. He was considering returning to the UK, when he auditioned for the role of Andy Barrett in Home and Away in September 2013. He was unsuccessful, but was later cast as doctor Nate Cooper. Pryor made his final appearance as Nate on 5 June 2017.

On 7 August 2018, it was announced that Pryor had joined the cast of British soap opera Hollyoaks. He left the show when his character Laurie Shelby was killed off in August 2019. Pryor made a guest appearance in fellow British soap opera Emmerdale as Darren in December 2022.

Pryor stars as the romantic lead in the 2024 television film Christmas at Plumhill Manor which premiered on the Great! Christmas channel on 15 November. In 2025, he joined the cast of Days of Our Lives in the role of Dominic Marino. His image first appeared during the 20 October 2026 episode.

== Personal life ==
Pryor was previously engaged to creative director Julia-Rose O'Connor. He has been in a relationship with his former Hollyoaks co-star Anna Passey since 2019. The couple run the candle company Kip Candle Co. Pryor took up candle making while he was in Home and Away as a way to decompress. When he took it up again, Passey suggested they turn it into a business.

== Filmography ==
Year	Title	Role	Notes
2010	Spartacus: Blood and Sand	Marcus	1 episode
2010	This Is Not My Life	Safeway Guard 1	
2010	Legend of the Seeker	Walter as 'D'Haran'	
2011	Go Girls	Shane	
2011	The Fall Guys	Max	
2011	Nothing Trivial	Saul	
2012	Auckland Daze	Kyle	
2013	The Blue Rose	Anton	
2013	Battles	Ryan	
2013	White Lies	Soldier	New Zealand film
2013–2017	Home and Away	Nate Cooper	Main cast (seasons 26–30)
2018–2019	Hollyoaks	Laurie Shelby	Main cast
2020	Finding Joy	Will Dack	4 episodes
2022	Emmerdale	Darren Walker	Guest
2024	Christmas at Plumhill Manor	Alfie	Television film
2026	Days of Our Lives	Dominic Marino	
