= List of Home and Away characters introduced in 2016 =

Home and Away is an Australian television soap opera. It was first broadcast on the Seven Network on 17 January 1988. The following is a list of characters that appeared in 2016, by order of first appearance. All characters are introduced by the soap's executive producer, Lucy Addario. The 29th season of Home and Away began airing on 1 February 2016. Dylan Carter was introduced during the same episode. Isla Schultz and Lindsay Ford arrived in March. May saw the arrivals of Mick Jennings and Tori Morgan. Her brothers – Brody, Justin and Mason Morgan – were introduced in June. The following month, Tabitha Ford arrived. Hope Morrison and Raffy Morrison made their debuts in September, while Jeannie Woods made her first appearance in November. Justin's daughter Ava Gilbert was introduced in December.

== Dylan Carter ==
Dylan Carter
- Home and Away character
- Portrayed by: Jeremy Lindsay Taylor
- Duration: 2016–2017, 2019
- First appearance: 1 February 2016
- Last appearance: 2 October 2019
- Introduced by: Lucy Addario
In-universe information
- Occupation: Detective
- Sons: Anton Carter

Dylan Carter, played by Jeremy Lindsay Taylor, made his first appearance on 1 February 2016. Lindsay Taylor's casting was announced on 5 August 2015. He commented, "I have always wanted to be a part of this. Home and Away is an institution, it is iconic Australian TV. It is great to finally be a part of the family. I play a great role, my character is very complex and very interesting so that is really what drew me to it." Dylan Carter is a detective, who works alongside Katarina Chapman (Pia Miller), following his arrival in Summer Bay. Lindsay Taylor said Dylan would be kept busy and added that he had a connection to the Bay. The actor reprised his role in 2017. Dylan returned in September that year, as part of a storyline involving Robbo (Jake Ryan), who suffers from amnesia. Lindsay Taylor reprised the role for another guest stint in September 2019.

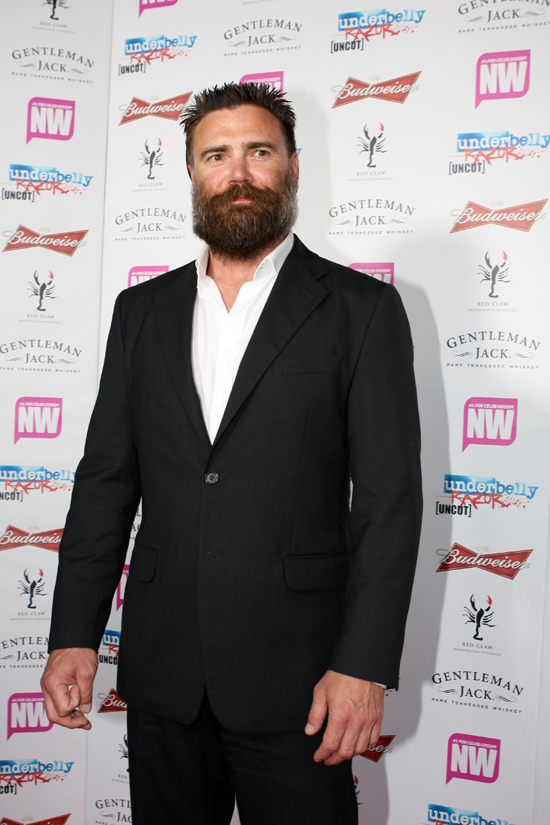
Jeremy Lindsay Taylor played Dylan Carter.

Dylan is the lead detective on the Charlotte King (Erika Heynatz) murder case, working alongside his former fiancée Katarina Chapman and Mike Emerson (Cameron Stewart). Dylan knows how uncomfortable Kat is when he signs up for the investigation, but Kat tells him that she is okay with his presence. Dylan and Kat question Martin Ashford (George Mason), Zac MacGuire (Charlie Clausen) and Zac and Charlotte's teenage son Hunter King (Scott Lee). Dylan asks Kat out to dinner as friends, but Kat refuses his offer as she is still affected by the abuse she suffered by Dylan. He apologises for his actions and Kat agrees that he should be sorry. Kat and Dylan question Irene Roberts (Lynne McGranger) over a piece of Irene's clothing being found at the crime scene but she is then cleared. Dylan asks Billie Ashford (Tessa de Josselin) a few questions and questions Phoebe Nicholson (Isabella Giovinazzo) about Ash's whereabouts on the night of the murder before he violently arrests Ash but is later cleared after Kat finds an alibi. Kat and Dylan discover that Charlotte had a second phone and learn that she made a call to Kyle Braxton (Nic Westaway) half an hour before her murder. They soon come to a dead end with Kyle but they discover footage from the Bait Shop that clearly shows Zac following Charlotte. Dylan then charges Zac with Charlotte's murder.

Morag Bellingham (Cornelia Frances) represents Zac and she immediately clashes with Dylan. At Zac's bail hearing, Morag notices a suspicious look between the judge and Dylan moments after Zac is denied bail. Morag later confronts Dylan about it. Zac is later released after Morag finds an alibi proving that he was at the caravan park at the time of Charlotte's death. Dylan and Kat stray from work to reattach before they find an article of a sex tape of Charlotte and Matt Page (Alec Snow) that has been released to the public. Matt is questioned but cleared. Determined not to let Dylan win, Kat asks Zac's wife Leah Patterson-Baker (Ada Nicodemou) if she remembers anything that was dodgy. Leah remembers Morag saying she had bad feelings about a look between the judge and Dylan after Zac was denied bail. Kat pays a visit to the judge and blackmails him into confessing that Dylan knew about an affair the judge was having and used that to blackmail him to refuse Zac bail. Kat then takes the judge's statement to Phillip McCarthy (Nicholas Cassim) who is appalled. McCarthy brings in David Joyce (Don Halbert) who tells Dylan is suspended until further notice. When Kat is alone at the Farmhouse, Dylan approaches her and tells her how they belong together. Kat tells him to go, and when he grabs her arm, she pushes him to the ground. She tells him that he is pathetic and that she is not going to let him intimidate her anymore, and Dylan leaves. Dylan has a run-in with Billie at the gym. Dylan later attacks Ash and holds him, Billie and Kat hostage at 31 Saxon Avenue. Kat tells Dylan that he has not dealt with the death of his son Anton properly, and he is arrested.

The following year, the police find Dylan's blood and gun on an abandoned boat that is also linked to amnesic Robbo. Constable Corelli (Nick Cain) later finds CCTV footage of Dylan holding Robbo at gunpoint in a marina. Two years later, Robbo has a flashback to the day he and Dylan were on the boat together. He and Dylan fought and Dylan was shot, but as Robbo's back was turned, Dylan hit him with a metal pipe, knocking him into the water. He then saw Dylan being helped into a second boat, confirming that Dylan is still alive. Robbo is kidnapped while visiting his family's graves and held captive in an old bunker. Dylan reveals himself to be behind Robbo's kidnapping, as he knows Robbo has been looking for him. He tells Robbo that he was not responsible for having his family killed. Dylan and Robbo fight, and Robbo gets the upper hand. He handcuffs Dylan and takes him to meet Ouroboros gang leader Victor (Patrick Thompson), who tasked Robbo to find Dylan. Victor's gang and Dylan are arrested by the Australian Federal Police. Several weeks later, Robbo learns that Dylan has been murdered in his prison cell.

== Isla Schultz ==
Isla Schultz
- Home and Away character
- Portrayed by: Samantha Jade
- First appearance: 3 March 2016
- Last appearance: 21 April 2016
- Introduced by: Lucy Addario
- Spin-off appearances: Home and Away: All or Nothing (2017)
In-universe information
- Daughters: Florence Kingswood; Lulu Kingswood

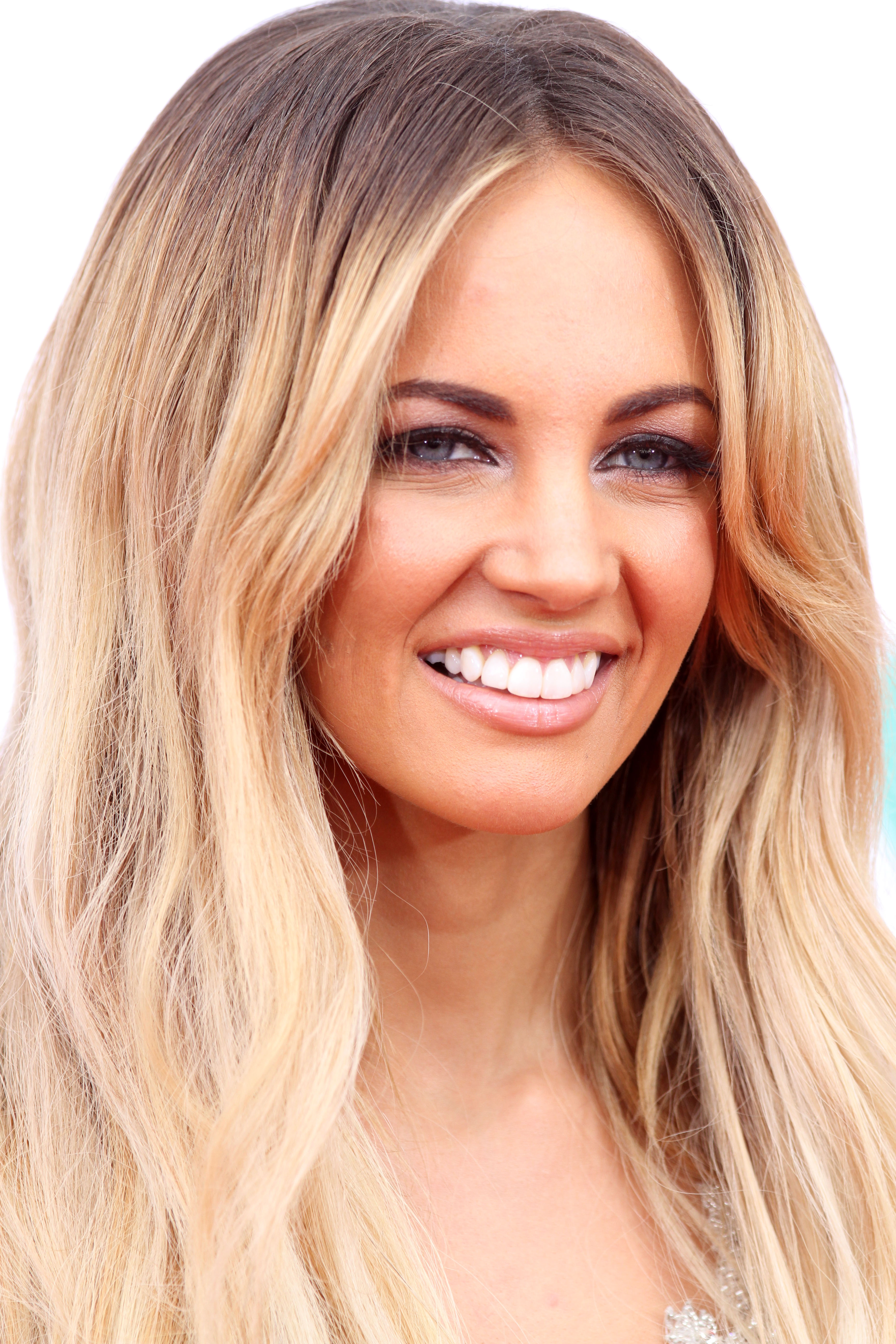
Samantha Jade played Isla Schultz.

Isla Schultz, played by singer Samantha Jade, made her first appearance on 3 March 2016. The character and Jade's casting was announced on 5 September 2015. Jade told Jonathon Moran of The Daily Telegraph, "I'm always asked when I will do more acting & now I am saying yes, I am coming to the Bay. It is really exciting. I've wanted to do more acting & I wanted to do something unexpected & different and this is very very different to Kylie (Minogue)." Jade began filming her first scenes three days after her casting announcement. She wrapped her stint on the show in November.

Isla comes to Summer Bay with "bad intentions" and Jade said she would have "a bit of a past". Isla also becomes a love interest for one of the male characters. Jade later described her character as "a bit naughty − a bit of a bad girl", as she has become involved with some bad people. However, Jade added that Isla would mean well.

Isla goes to Angelo's and flirts with Kyle Braxton (Nic Westaway), before informing someone on the phone that she has found him. Isla later tells Kyle that she works for Dave Rogers (Yure Covich), a man Kyle lost money to during a poker game in Melbourne. Dave has sent Isla to collect Kyle's debt, but Kyle does not pay up. When Dave makes threats, Kyle tries to get Isla out of Summer Bay to protect her, but Dave has them kidnapped and driven out to the bush. Dave gives Kyle and Isla a shovel and tells them to dig their own graves. They manage to escape and Kyle goes to the police. He lets Isla stay with him and they have sex. Isla's former partner, Harry Kingswood (Wayne Bradley), brings their daughters to Summer Bay to visit her. After spending the day with them, Isla later takes her daughter and Harry threatens to call the police. Kyle finds Isla working in a brothel and convinces her to return the girls to Harry. When Isla learns Harry is moving interstate, she buys a gun and tries to rob the Reefton Lakes golf club. Kyle finds out her plan and arrives to talk her out of it. He convinces her to run, just as the police storm the building. Kyle is arrested and charged with armed robbery. He refuses to give up Isla to the police as he wants her to have a better life with her daughters. Isla intends to hand herself in, but Kyle takes the money and the gun and gives them to the police with his fingerprints on them. Isla comes to see Ricky Sharpe (Bonnie Sveen), who informs her Kyle has been sentenced to thirteen years in prison. When Ricky tells Isla that she hopes she was worth it, Isla states that she will make sure she is. She adds that Kyle is the best man she has ever known, before leaving.

== Lindsay Ford ==
Lindsay Ford
- Home and Away character
- Portrayed by: Georgia Flood
- First appearance: 17 March 2016
- Last appearance: 31 March 2016
- Introduced by: Lucy Addario

Lindsay Ford, played by Georgia Flood, made her first appearance on 17 March 2016. Flood's casting was announced on 7 October 2015, while her character was revealed in March 2016. When Flood was offered the role, she was unsure that she could see herself on the show, but thought her character was "really cool" and accepted. She enjoyed filming her guest appearance, commenting, "I loved, loved doing it and would go back there in a heartbeat."

Lindsay tries to contact Hunter King (Scott Lee), but he refuses to take her calls. She later comes to the caravan park to see him. She introduces herself to Hunter's girlfriend Olivia (Raechelle Banno) and reveals that she was the person who picked Hunter up the night he left Summer Bay. Hunter thanks Lindsay for letting him stay with her and she explains that she wanted to see him after reading that his father is in prison. Lindsay also mentions that she plans on staying for a while, but adds that she does not want to ruin Hunter and Olivia's relationship. However, she later tells Olivia that she and Hunter kissed. Lindsay comes to check on Hunter and he apologises for leading her on, before asking her to leave so he can fix his relationship with Olivia. Lindsay runs into Olivia on the beach and implies that she and Hunter did more than just kiss. When Olivia later sees Lindsay with her arm around Hunter, she ends their relationship. Lindsay throws a party on the beach and pays Drew Panton (Govinda Roser-Finch) to make advances towards Olivia, so she can take a photo of them together. Hunter and Olivia break up. Lindsay goes to the diner and purposely annoys Olivia, who attempts to hit her. Lindsay meets up with Hunter, telling him that Olivia has moved on. They spend the day watching films and Lindsay tries to kiss Hunter, but he tells her he just wants to be friends. Lindsay steals Alf Stewart's (Ray Meagher) ute and Hunter is knocked unconscious trying to stop her. Lindsay flees the scene. She later meets up with Olivia, who tells her to leave town or she will call the police about Hunter's accident.

== Mick Jennings ==
Mick Jennings
- Home and Away character
- Portrayed by: Kristian Schmid
- Duration: 2016–2017
- First appearance: 5 May 2016
- Last appearance: 28 November 2017
- Introduced by: Lucy Addario
In-universe information
- Mother: Irene Roberts
- Half-brothers: Nathan Roberts; Damian Roberts
- Half-sisters: Finlay Roberts
- Daughters: Luc Patterson

Mick Jennings, played by Kristian Schmid, made his first appearance on 5 May 2016. Mick was introduced as the long-lost son of established character Irene Roberts (Lynne McGranger). Shortly before his arrival, Irene revealed that she had been raped when she was 14 and gave birth to a baby when she was 15. The baby was given up for adoption. Mick was also revealed to be Billie Ashford's (Tessa de Josselin) rapist, a storyline which Daniel Kilkelly from Digital Spy branded "dark". Kilkelly also called Mick "twisted" and a "villain". A TV Week writer opined, "Wouldn't you hate to have a son like Mick?" Upon Mick's second appearance in the Bay, a columnist for New Idea commented, "There's not a soul in Summer Bay who doesn't want Mick to leave town for good."

Mick comes to the Beach House on the pretence that he is Chris Harrington's (Johnny Ruffo) uncle. Irene Roberts lets him wait inside with her. While looking through some photos, Mick makes a comment about Irene acting as a surrogate for her daughter. He tries to pass it off as something Chris told him, but Irene grows suspicious and tries to leave. Mick stops her and tells her she is not leaving him again. He then kidnaps Irene and uses her phone to text Olivia Fraser Richards (Raechelle Banno). Mick tells Irene that he is the son she gave up when she was a teenager, but she refuses to believe him. When Mick tries to abduct Olivia, she hides her phone in his car to allow the police to track him. Mick realises the police are closing in on him, so he prepares to move Irene to a new location, but she escapes and Mick is caught by the police. He is taken to the hospital, where a DNA test confirms that he is Irene's son. Billie Ashford realises Mick is her rapist after seeing a distinctive tattoo on his arm. Mick is released from the psychiatric hospital early and he returns to Summer Bay to see Irene, who tells him to stay away from her. Mick tries again to talk to Irene and grabs her arm. He is tasered by Kat Chapman (Pia Miller) and arrested for breaching an AVO. He is checked out at the hospital, where he sees Billie with her newborn daughter Luc Patterson. He realises that he must be Luc's father and takes her from the hospital. He contacts Irene and asks her to meet him at the park, where he asks her to listen to him. Irene tells Mick that she never had the chance to hold him when he was born and Mick apologises to Irene for hurting her and Billie. Irene forgives him and Mick says goodbye to Luc, before handing her over to Irene. As Irene returns Luc to Billie, Mick surrenders to the police and is arrested. He later asks for access to Luc.

Months later, Mick calls Irene to try and let her know that he is up for parole from the psychiatric hospital, but she refuses to listen to him. Billie's brother Martin Ashford (George Mason) goes to see Mick at the hospital. When Mick realises who Ash is, he apologises for hurting Billie, but Ash lashes out and attacks him. Mick begs Irene to help him get out, but she decides she cannot support him. Mick is later granted parole. Irene visits him at a halfway house, where she discovers he has been attacked. She moves him to a motel in the Bay. While out walking, Mick comes across Maggie Astoni (Kestie Morassi) attempting to change a flat tyre. He helps her out and she invites him back to her house, where Olivia sees him and reveals that Mick is a rapist. Maggie's husband Ben Astoni (Rohan Nichol) throws him out. Irene tells Mick that she cannot be in his life anymore and Alf Stewart (Ray Meagher) arranges a job for Mick in the mines in Western Australia, but Mick refuses to leave. Mick visits Irene with Luc and tries to give her a teddy bear, but Irene asks him to leave. She collapses and Mick takes Luc back to her home, while Irene goes to the hospital. VJ Patterson (Matt Little) turns up and takes Luc from him, and Mick flees when Ash arrives. Ash later kidnaps Mick and takes him out to the bush, where he threatens to kill him. Mick falls over a cliff, but he manages to hang onto the edge despite dislocating his shoulder. He is rescued by Hunter King (Scott Lee), Mason Morgan (Orpheus Pledger) and Brody Morgan (Jackson Heywood). Mick tells Irene that he does not trust Ash and that Luc is not safe with him. Mick hires a lawyer and attempts to gain custody of Luc. When his medication runs out, he approaches Ziggy Astoni (Sophie Dillman) for help, but she is scared of him and runs away. She later makes a statement to the police, who question and release Mick. Mick suspects Ash is going to leave the Bay with Luc, but Irene assures him that is not true. He later learns that VJ left the Bay with Luc. Alf convinces him to take the job in WA, and Irene decides to go too, so she can help him settle in. Months later, Mick has a mining accident and Irene goes over there to support him

== Tori Morgan ==
Tori Morgan, played by Penny McNamee, made her first appearance on 5 May 2016. The character and casting was announced on 22 November 2015. McNamee commented that the role was her "dream job" and something she had wanted since she began her acting career. She began filming her first scenes in early November and praised her co-star Georgie Parker for helping her out on set. Tori is a doctor who comes to Summer Bay for a fresh start. McNamee commented that she would have "dark secrets". In an interview with Ali Cromarty of TV Week, McNamee explained that Tori was running from something and came to check out Summer Bay for her family. Tori is the first of four Morgan siblings to arrive, and she wants to see if it is safe to bring her brothers there.

== Brody Morgan ==
Brody Morgan, played by Jackson Heywood, made his first appearance on 7 June 2016. Heywood previously appeared on the show in 2009 as Lachie Cladwell. The character and Heywood's casting was announced on 5 December 2015, alongside James Stewart and Orpheus Pledger, who play Brody's brothers. The actors began filming their first scenes during the week commencing 7 December. Heywood expects the Morgan brothers to be compared to the Braxton brothers who were introduced to the show in 2011. He commented, "I can definitely see that, but I think we have a very different dynamic. It will be exciting to tell the story and as it will be revealed, it will be a very different story." Brody is a chef who has "big ambitions".

== Justin Morgan ==
Justin Morgan, played by James Stewart, made his first appearance on 7 June 2016. The character and Stewart's casting was announced on 5 December 2015, alongside Jackson Heywood and Orpheus Pledger, who play Justin's brothers. The actors began filming their first scenes during the week commencing 7 December. Justin is Stewart's first on-going role since he took a year off to care for his young daughter. Like Heywood, Stewart expected Braxton brothers comparisons, but he told Jonathon Moran of The Daily Telegraph, "Creating this family is probably more our priority than taking over the Brax boys. How do you take on Steve Peacocke (Brax)? I hope Australia is ready for it, it is the way it is." In August 2017, Stewart was longlisted for Best Daytime Star at the Inside Soap Awards. The nomination did not progress to the viewer-voted shortlist.

== Mason Morgan ==
Mason Morgan, played by Orpheus Pledger, made his first appearance on 7 June 2016. The character and Pledger's casting details were announced on 5 December 2015, alongside Jackson Heywood and James Stewart, who play Mason's brothers. The actors began filming their first scenes during the week commencing 7 December. Pledger relocated from his home town of Melbourne to Sydney for the role. Pledger described his character as having a "positive outlook on life" and someone who "stands up for what he believes in". Mason is a medical student, who struggles to fit to maintain a social life in between studying and working out in the gym.

== Tabitha Ford ==
Tabitha Ford
- Home and Away character
- Portrayed by: Eliza Scanlen
- First appearance: 21 July 2016
- Last appearance: 27 September 2016
- Introduced by: Lucy Addario
In-universe information
- Occupation: Student
- Sisters: Juliette Ford

Tabitha Ford, played by Eliza Scanlen, made her first appearance on 21 July 2016. Johnathon Hughes of Digital Spy included Tabitha on his list of the "most evil mean girls in soap". He stated, "The scourge of Summer Bay High was obsessed with frenemy Olivia Fraser Richards and tried to steal the vulnerable teen's life by playing on her abusive past. Attempting to take Olivia's hunky boyfriend Hunter, terrible Tabitha turned more Single White Female than Mean Girls when she started dressing like her rival to tempt him." Hughes went on to say that Tabitha "crossed the line" when she posed as Olivia's abuser and that everyone in the Bay was relieved when she left for boarding school.

Tabitha approaches Olivia Fraser Richards (Raechelle Banno) to ask for directions for the Surf Club, and they recognise each other from group counselling. Olivia invites Tabitha to a school sleep out. Tabitha warns Olivia's former boyfriend Hunter King (Scott Lee) to stay away from Olivia. She tells Olivia that Hunter called her self-harm scars disgusting, and denies lying when confronted. Tabitha records Zac MacGuire (Charlie Clausen) entering his password in the school system, and she later uses it to change Hunter's exam result, which results in his suspension. Olivia discovers the video on Tabitha's phone and tells Zac, but Tabitha erases the video. Olivia later records Tabitha confessing to the switch and she ends their friendship. Tabitha starts dressing like Olivia and sneaks into Hunter's caravan to kiss him. Hunter kisses her back, mistaking her for Olivia. Tabitha tells Olivia what happened, hoping Olivia will break up with Hunter. Zac contacts Tabitha's parents about her behaviour and the police give her a warning. After Olivia cancels plans to go to the dance with him, Hunter goes to the Diner and notices Tabitha on her laptop. He becomes suspicious when Tabitha brings up his cancelled date. He takes the laptop from her and sees that she is blackmailing Olivia by pretending to be her abuser Kirk Sheppard. The following day, Olivia confronts Tabitha at school, as she packs up her belongings. Olivia and Hunter later see Tabitha and her sister, Juliette (Rose Marel), at the Diner and they eat lunch with them. Olivia wishes Tabitha well at her new school, and they say goodbye.

== Hope Morrison ==
Hope Morrison
- Home and Away character
- Portrayed by: Jessica Falkholt
- First appearance: 19 September 2016
- Last appearance: 7 November 2016
- Introduced by: Lucy Addario
In-universe information
- Occupation: Waitress
- Uncles: Atticus Decker
- First cousins: Raffy Morrison

Hope Morrison, played by Jessica Falkholt, made her first appearance on 19 September 2016.

Hope attempts to hit Justin Morgan (James Stewart) with a piece of timber, after hearing him outside her home. Martin Ashford (George Mason) and Kat Chapman (Pia Miller) stop her from running away. Justin tells Hope that Atticus Decker (John Adam) is in the hospital. Her younger sister Raffy Morrison (Olivia Deeble) comes outside and reveals that Decker is their uncle. Justin tells Hope that Decker's car was deliberately run off the road. Spike Lowe (Jason Montgomery) and his associates attempt to kidnap Raffy and Hope. Ash saves Raffy, but Hope is thrown into the waiting car and driven away. Spike takes Hope to the hospital and pretends to be her husband, so he can access Decker's room. Spike attempts to give Decker a lethal injection, but is stopped just in time and arrested. Raffy and Hope are invited to stay at the farmhouse with Kat and Phoebe Nicholson (Isabella Giovinazzo). Hope annoys Phoebe when she wears her clothes and eats her food. Hope accidentally breaks her phone and later accuses John Palmer (Shane Withington) of breaking it when he bumps into her. She asks for a few hundred dollars, which John refuses to pay. Justin gives Hope a part-time job at the garage, where she steals credit card details from customers. Hope tries to flee the Bay, but she is arrested and charged for misappropriation of funds.

On the day she is released, Justin tells Hope that Raffy is Decker's daughter and his half-sister. Hope packs up her and Raffy's belongings and steals Mason's car. She picks up Raffy, but the car breaks down and they are forced to walk. Hope slips and falls down a steep bank, causing a tear in her liver. Raffy flags down Nate Cooper (Kyle Pryor) and he treats Hope, before she is taken to the hospital for surgery. While she recovers, Hope tells Raffy not to trust the Morgans. Raffy soon learns that she is related to the Morgans and that Hope is not her sister. She and Hope decide to leave the Bay. Hope steals money from Salt, but she is caught and arrested by Kat. Hope is sent to remand, but she is brought back to the Yabbie Creek police station when she struggles to cope being in solitary confinement. Hope struggles to sleep, so Nate Cooper (Kyle Pryor) prescribes her some diazepam. Hope steals some sleeping pills from his kit and takes an accidental overdose, resulting in her hospitalisation. Hope apologises to Phoebe and asks her to look after Raffy. After Hope is discharged, she is able to say goodbye to Raffy before she is taken back to prison. She encourages Raffy to trust the Morgans and tells Justin to take care of Raffy. Hope was then escorted back to prison by the police. A year later, Hope send Raffy a hand-made card for her 14th birthday.

== Raffy Morrison ==
Raffy Morrison
- Home and Away character
- Portrayed by: Olivia Deeble
- Duration: 2016–2019
- First appearance: 19 September 2016
- Last appearance: 12 September 2019
- Introduced by: Lucy Addario
In-universe information
- Occupation: Waitress; Juice bar worker
- Father: Atticus Decker
- Mother: Kate Lee
- Half-brothers: Justin Morgan; Brody Morgan; Mason Morgan
- Half-sisters: Tori Morgan
- Nephews: Mason
- Nieces: Ava Gilbert; Grace Morgan
- First cousins: Hope Morrison

Raffy Morrison, played by Olivia Deeble, made her first appearance on 19 September 2016. Details of Deeble's casting and her character were announced on 9 September. The actress relocated to Sydney from Melbourne for filming, and she has a three-year contract with the show. On 10 May 2019, Jonathon Moran of The Daily Telegraph reported that Deeble had finished filming with the serial. Deeble chose not to renew her contract. Her final scenes as Raffy aired on 12 September 2019.

Raffy hears her sister Hope Morrison (Jessica Falkholt) talking to Justin Morgan (James Stewart) about their uncle Atticus Decker (John Adam), who is in the hospital. Raffy is almost kidnapped by Spike Lowe (Jason Montgomery) and his associates, but saved by Martin Ashford (George Mason). However, Hope is taken. Kat Chapman (Pia Miller) tells Raffy that the police will find Hope. Raffy then breaks down and admits that she has no one else. However Hope was safe and she and Raffy move into the Farmhouse with Katarina Chapman (Pia Miller), Billie Ashford (Tessa de Josselin) and Phoebe Nicholson (Isabella Giovinazzo). Raffy attends Summer Bay High and befriends Eloise Page (Darcey Wilson). Decker later reveals to the Morgans that he had an affair with their mother, Kate Lee née Sparrow, and that Raffy is in fact their half-sister and Hope's cousin. Raffy found out the truth after finding DNA test results at the Morgan's house and confronts Justin and Tori Morgan (Penny McNamee) who come clean, telling her that their mother Kate is her real mum and Decker is her real dad. Raffy was hurt and upset by this and runs away. Hope convinces Raffy to run away with her and she accepts. But their plan fails as Hope gets arrested. Raffy found out from Justin that Hope got arrested and refuses to leave with Justin. Raffy meets Hope again and Hope tells her that she's going back to prison and will stay there 6 months or a year and tells her that she should stay with the Morgans. But Raffy refuses to leave Hope, but Hope gave Raffy to Justin and Raffy cries in Phoebe's arms as Hope is taken away by the police. Raffy learnt from her siblings that their parents were murdered by drug dealers and that they are under witness protection. Raffy runs away and ends up at the Farmhouse. Raffy almost exposes the Morgans' secret to Kat, but Phoebe arrives in time, able to stop Raffy revealing her siblings' secrets. Phoebe tells her to grow up and show some respect to her older siblings. A week later, Raffy found out Decker was shot. But at the hospital, Tori told her that Decker didn't make it and Raffy runs off in tears, with Mason running after her and comforting her in his arms.

Brody who was on drugs, shouted at Raffy and Justin was furious. Justin was even more angry when Brody drove high speed with Raffy inside. When Eloise told her that her brother Matt Page (Alec Snow) and his fiancée Evelyn MacGuire (Philippa Northeast) invites her to go to Vietnam with them, which she refuses to go. Raffy tells her that Matt isn't her legal guardian, nor is Evelyn. But Eloise changed her mind. Raffy attends to Matt and Evelyn's wedding at the Farmhouse and the next day, she says goodbye to Elly as she left for Vietnam with Matt and Evelyn. Raffy meets her niece and Justin's daughter Ava Gilbert (Grace Thomas) who showed up at Summer Bay from the city. Raffy later plays with Justin and Ava at the beach. One day, Raffy was told by her siblings that she has to move out, due to Brody's drug addiction got worse and Raffy moves in with John Palmer (Shane Withington) and Marilyn Chambers (Emily Symons), but is hurt that she cannot live her family. Raffy befriended with newcomer Coco Astoni (Anna Cocquerel), who moves to Summer Bay from the city with her family. Raffy stood up for Coco when she was bullied by Jennifer Dutton (Brittany Santariga), but Coco tells Raffy to back off.

When Brody became addicted to drugs, Raffy moves in with John Palmer (Shane Withington) and Marilyn Chambers (Emily Symons). New school principal Maggie Astoni asked Raffy move up in her daughter, Coco's year and she refuses but later change her mind. But Raffy struggles as she is also bullied by Jennifer too. While waiting for the bus, Raffy encounters former student, Mackenzie (Luke Davis), who offers her a ride home and she accepts a lift. Once getting into his truck, Mackenzie takes advances towards her, by putting his hand on her leg, making Raffy uncomfortable and she tries to leave the truck, but Mackenzie drives off with Raffy inside. Raffy begs him to let her out, but he refuses. Raffy was saved by Robbo (Jake Ryan).

When Coco starts hanging out with Jennifer and her friends, Raffy felt left out, and it strain their friendship. Raffy helps Olivia Fraser Richards with her fashion designs but accidentally cut all of Olivia's fabrics. Olivia gets angry and called Raffy "stupid". Raffy flees and took all her anger and accidentally threw a rock at Roo Stewart's (Georgie Parker) car, which is witnessed by Maggie and her husband Ben Astoni (Rohan Nichol). While attending to Olivia's fashion launch party at Salt, Jennifer gives Raffy alcohol to drink, while still underage. Raffy gets drunk and takes more drinks, until being caught by Brody. Raffy confronts Jennifer for getting her drunk and pushes her, but was caught Maggie. Raffy admits to Maggie, John and Marilyn that she hates school. Justin seeing how much she misses her family, decided to let her move back with him again and Raffy agrees and she moves back with the Morgans. Raffy and Coco reconcile their friendship and Raffy befriended with Ryder Jackson (Lukas Radovich) and takes a liking to him. But finds out that Coco also taking a liking to Ryder and tells Coco to pursue Ryder.

While taking Alf Stewart (Ray Meagher)'s boat for a joyride with Ryder, they both discover the dead body of Dennis Novak. They quickly flee and Ryder ask her to keep it quiet and she agrees. But Raffy started having nightmares which worries her brothers and Raffy tells Justin and Mason about the body. At first they thought she was joking until she took them to the scene, and called the police. Raffy and Ryder joins Coco when she has been protesting the community. Raffy later tells Ryder that Coco likes him. Raffy was devastated when she learned that Kat has died in a car accident. Raffy and Ryder supports Coco when Maggie is diagnosed with cancer. Raffy. Raffy moves back in with John and Marilyn when Robbo is in hiding. Raffy meets John and Marilyn's new foster son Ty Anderson (Darius Williams) and they didn't get along well at first and started fighting. When Ty tells her that John and Marilyn will never love her like their own, Raffy slaps him. Roo tells them to apologise but they refuse. Raffy apologise to Ty and they start to get along and bond. Ty stood up for Raffy when another student shoves her. But they argue again when Ty refuses to let her listen to his music.

Ty later lets her listen to his music and while listening to it, he kisses her, only to be walked in by Justin and John. Justin takes her home. Raffy and Ty meets up at the beach and they share another kiss. Raffy moved back in with John and Marilyn the next day. Ty and Raffy began a relationship but Ty became close to Ryder and Raffy assumes Ty has lost interest in her. Raffy visits Ty at the hospital after he got injured in the bush. Ty tells her that he's gay and Raffy felt like he's using her and they broke up, leaving her heartbroken. Raffy was bullied by Abbi Springwell about her break up with Ty. Raffy became distant towards Ty and Ryder, but later she and Ty remain as friends. Ty and Raffy helps Ryder and Coco get back together. When Ty's estranged mother Jodi Anderson (Sara Zwangobani) comes to the bay, Raffy supports Ty and encourages him to talk to her. Raffy and Ty says their final goodbye when he leaves with his mother. Raffy, Ryder and Coco goes camping together and Ryder takes them to an old hideout of the River Boys and they found underground hideout. But the roof collapsed and Raffy was trapped after getting hit in the head.

Raffy is rescued by Dean Thompson (Patrick O'Connor), Colby Thorne (Tim Franklin) and Chelsea Campbell (Ashleigh Brewer) and is taken to hospital. Raffy began to have seizures and learns that she has epilepsy. Raffy and Ryder starts to have feelings for each other and they start a relationship. But Coco, became hurt after she and Ryder has broken up a few months, but accepts them to be together. Raffy learns that Tori is pregnant with Robbo's baby. Raffy's epilepsy gets worse and Mason use drugs to make an epilepsy oil to stop the seizures. But Mason was arrested after he was caught getting drugs. Raffy befriended with Colby's sister Bella Nixon (Courtney Miller). Raffy learns that Brody cheated on his wife Ziggy Astoni (Sophie Dillman) with Simone Bedford (Emily Eskell), Raffy confronts Simone for ruin Brody and Ziggy's marriage. Raffy was accused of graffitiing Simone's office, but turns Bella was responsible as she wants to impress Raffy. Raffy accepts Simone and Raffy befriended with John and Marilyn's adoptive son Jett James (Will McDonald) who helps her with her studies. Raffy and Ryder were unable to spend time together due to their schedules and they break up. Raffy became devastated as Tori was taken into witness protection with Robbo and his wife Jasmine Delaney (Sam Frost). Raffy got accepted to a medical trial, which is in Victoria and Justin tells her that Brody and Simone would be happy to have her move in with them if she accepts the trial. Raffy accept her medical trial. She says goodbye to her family and friends, and left a letter to John and Marilyn before leaving Summer Bay.

== Jeannie Woods ==
Jeannie Woods
- Home and Away character
- Portrayed by: Anna Bamford
- First appearance: 1 November 2016
- Last appearance: 28 November 2016
- Introduced by: Lucy Addario
In-universe information
- Occupation: Waitress
- Father: Randall Woods

Jeannie Woods, played by Anna Bamford, made her first appearance on 1 November 2016. Bamford was on-screen for approximately six weeks. Jeannie was introduced as a potential love interest for Brody Morgan (Jackson Heywood). She comes to Summer Bay after Evelyn MacGuire (Philippa Northeast) invites her to play in a volleyball match at the local youth centre. Bamford told Stephen Downie of TV Week that Jeannie and Brody would form "an unusual relationship". She also said that she developed a good friendship with Heywood during filming.

Jeannie sees Brody Morgan drop some barbecue supplies and helps him pick them up. Jeannie signs up for the charity beach volleyball game, and she is paired with Matt Page (Alec Snow). Brody offers Evelyn MacGuire $1000 to play the last match with Jeannie. He later tries to give Jeannie a bracelet he thinks she dropped, but it actually belongs to Matt's sister, Eloise Page (Darcey Wilson). Jeannie then disappears. Days later, she returns for a job interview and comes across Brody on the beach, where she gets him to ask her out for a drink. Brody walks to work in the same direction as Jeannie and she thinks he is following her. She soon learns Brody owns the restaurant where she has her interview. Jeannie leaves when the interview does not go well, but she later returns to start over with Brody, who gives her the job. Brody trains Jeannie on her first day, and they flirt with each other. They share a drink at the end of the day and Jeannie thanks Brody with a kiss on the cheek. When he tries to kiss her back, she shoves him and he tells her to leave.

Jeannie returns to apologise, and while Brody does not fire her, she decides to quit. She tells Evie that she overreacted and that she likes Brody, but did not want to jeopardise her job. That night, Jeannie meets Brody at Salt and he offers her the job back. Jeannie accepts and kisses him. They arrange a dinner date at Brody's house. Jeannie turns up in tears and tells Brody that her parents have thrown her out. The following day, Jeannie's father, Randall (Paul Ceaser) turns up at the house looking for her. Once he has calmed down, Jeannie introduces him to Brody. After he leaves, Jeannie tells Brody that her parents are doomsday preppers. Jeannie and Brody agree to date in secret. Randall later follows Jeannie to work and finds her and Brody kissing. Brody ends up insulting Randall and his beliefs. He later apologises to Jeannie and she accepts that her father's ideas can seem strange. They agree to a fresh start, but they fall out again when Brody makes a joke about doomsdays preppers. They decide to stop seeing each other, and Jeannie quits the restaurant for a job in Yabbie Creek.

== Ava Gilbert ==
Ava Gilbert
- Home and Away character
- Portrayed by: Grace Thomas (2016–18); Alice Roberts (2019–2020); Annabel Wolfe (2023–2024)
- Duration: 2016–2020, 2023–2024
- First appearance: 8 December 2016
- Last appearance: 10 April 2024
- Introduced by: Lucy Addario
In-universe information
- Father: Justin Morgan
- Mother: Nina Gilbert
- Stepfather: Brian Gilbert
- Uncles: Brody Morgan; Mason Morgan
- Aunts: Tori Morgan; Raffy Morrison
- First cousins: Grace Morgan

Ava Gilbert made her first appearance on 8 December 2016. She is Justin Morgan's (James Stewart) daughter. Ava was originally played by Grace Thomas upon her introduction, followed by Alice Roberts. The role was recast to Annabel Wolfe in February 2023. The recast allowed writers to give Ava more grown up storylines, as she is now a teenager. Ava makes an unannounced return to the Bay to see her father, but she is unable to hide her admiration for his apprentice Theo Poulos (Matt Evans). Wolfe thought the storyline would be relatable to "father-daughter relationships", saying "Until now, Ava has appeared on the show only as a 'little girl' or at a stage of pre-adolescence, Justin quickly realises how much she's grown up in his absence – not only physically, but mentally." Wolfe also said this would lead to problems as they struggle to understand one another. Justin learns from Ava's mother that she has been talking to a boy online, so when they argued about it, she left for the Bay. While Justin pushes Ava into opening up to him about the boy, Theo and Kirby Aramoana (Angelina Thomson) defend her, pointing out that it is likely just a crush. Wolfe told Tamara Cullen of TV Week that Ava would "bring chaos" to Justin's life with her rebellious, resentful attitude. The character returns to the Bay for Justin's wedding to Leah in April 2024.

While Ava is walking home from school, she notices Justin Morgan leaving his cap behind on a bench and returns it to him. Justin realises that she is his daughter when she enters Nina Gilbert's (Zoe Naylor) house. Weeks later, Ava turns up at Justin's house, having left the city on a bus. She asks Justin if he is her father and he confirms that he is. Ava bonds with Justin's fiancée Phoebe Nicholson and his sister Raffy Morrison. Ava's stepfather Brian Gilbert (Tom O'Sullivan) comes to collect her and gets into an argument with Justin, causing her to run off. She is struck by Patrick Stanwood's (Luke McKenzie) car. Brian later allows Justin to spend time with Ava. When Nina and Brian go away for a few days, Ava comes to stay with Justin and befriends Scarlett Snow (Tania Nolan). Months later, Ava returns to the Bay to see Justin and meets his girlfriend Willow Harris (Sarah Roberts), who she bonds with. Ava is kidnapped by Boyd Easton (Steve Le Marquand) and his mother Hazel Easton (Genevieve Lemon). When Boyd is found with Ava, Willow helps saves her and tells her to run, where she is rescued by Justin and Colby Thorne (Tim Franklin). Justin and Willow's relationship ends and Nina bans Justin from seeing Ava for a while.

Ava returns to the Bay to stay with Justin and meets his new partner Leah Patterson (Ada Nicodemou), whom she initially seems to dislike. Leah offers Ava a piece of quiche, but Ava gives it to Buddy. After seeing Justin and Leah kissing, Ava asks to go home. Justin becomes suspicious of Ava's strange behaviour and asks her if something happened back at home. Ava admits that Nina and Brian had an argument and Brian has moved out. Ava soon bonds with Leah, after playing football together with Justin, and she agrees to visit more often. Nina later asks Justin to look after Ava, as she and Brian have decided to break up. Justin learns Ava is not allowed to contact Brian and he and Leah take her camping. He later persuades Nina to let Ava speak to Brian. After Justin's sister Tori Morgan (Penny McNamee) is hospitalised, a struggling Justin takes Ava to visit Brody Morgan (Jackson Heywood) and Raffy Morrison (Olivia Deeble) in Yarra Valley, and then returns her to Nina. Tori later invites Ava to visit Justin, but he decides to go to the city to see her and then brings her back to the Bay. Justin tells Ava that he has a tumour on his spine and he agrees to have surgery to remove it. Not wanting Ava around if the surgery goes wrong, he spends the day with her, before sending her back to the city.

== Others ==
Date(s)	Character	Actor	Circumstances
11 February	Louisa O'Brien	Claudia Cranstoun	Louisa spots Josh Barrett in the diner and invites him to spend the afternoon with her and some friends from their HSC course. When Josh has to look after Casey Braxton, Louisa, Glen Day and Adriana Kerr come to his house. Louisa becomes fed up with Casey's crying and turns off the baby monitor to spend time with Josh.
11 February	Glen Day	Logan Stevenson	Glen and Adriana spend the afternoon with Louisa O'Brien and Josh Barrett from their HSC course. Glen later leaves for work and Louisa encourages Adriana to go after him, so she can spend time with Josh alone.
11 February	Adriana Kerr	Hana Lee Woodbridge	Glen and Adriana spend the afternoon with Louisa O'Brien and Josh Barrett from their HSC course. Glen later leaves for work and Louisa encourages Adriana to go after him, so she can spend time with Josh alone.
11 February	Psych Nurse	Angie Diaz	The Psych Nurse lets Skye Peters into see her mother Carol. She also lets Skye know that Carol can hear her, despite her condition.
18 February	Destiny Starr	Lara Schwerdt	Destiny meets Chris Harrington for a first date at the diner. They get on well, until Chris starts talking about his ex-girlfriend. Destiny realises that Chris is not over that relationship and she leaves.
25 February	Coach McKinnon	Warren Ekermans	During a high school basketball game, Coach McKinnon breaks up a fight between VJ Patterson and Hunter King, and sends VJ off.
2 March	Zara Leonard	Georgia Nichols	Oscar MacGuire notices Zara at Angelo's and goes over to speak to her about their university course. Skye Peters later spots Oscar and Zara kissing on the balcony.
2–17 March	Claire Lewis	Anita Hegh	Claire turns up at Irene Roberts's house and tells Irene that she might be her daughter. They bond during a conversation about their lives. Olivia Fraser Richards is suspicious of Claire and suggests she and Irene take a DNA test. She later tells Claire that Irene's child was conceived via sexual assault and Claire leaves. Irene finds her and tells her that she did want her child, despite who her father was. When Irene finds out that Claire has been evicted, she invites her to move in. They continue to bond, but Olivia reveals that she has done a DNA test and Claire is not Irene's daughter. Claire decides to leave.
15 March–11 April	Harry Kingswood	Wayne Bradley	Harry brings Florence and Lulu to Summer Bay to visit their mother Isla Schultz. The girls spend the afternoon playing on the beach with Isla, while Harry talks with Kyle Braxton. Harry believes Isla has not changed. Hours later, Harry turns up at Kyle's house and tells him Isla has taken the girls. Kyle finds Isla working in a brothel and convinces her to return the girls to Harry.
15 March–11 April	Florence Kingswood	Charlee Kwintner	Harry brings Florence and Lulu to Summer Bay to visit their mother Isla Schultz. The girls spend the afternoon playing on the beach with Isla, while Harry talks with Kyle Braxton. Harry believes Isla has not changed. Hours later, Harry turns up at Kyle's house and tells him Isla has taken the girls. Kyle finds Isla working in a brothel and convinces her to return the girls to Harry.
15 March–11 April	Lulu Kingswood	Mia Kwintner	Harry brings Florence and Lulu to Summer Bay to visit their mother Isla Schultz. The girls spend the afternoon playing on the beach with Isla, while Harry talks with Kyle Braxton. Harry believes Isla has not changed. Hours later, Harry turns up at Kyle's house and tells him Isla has taken the girls. Kyle finds Isla working in a brothel and convinces her to return the girls to Harry.
17 March	Alessia De Luca	Bridgette Hollitt	Alessia attends a university party at Angelo's. Maddy Osborne introduces Alessia to her set of friends, and Alessia flirts with Oscar MacGuire. Skye Peters later sees them kissing on the balcony.
17 March	Tanya Hardy	Ashleigh O'Brien	Tanya attends the university party at Angelo's and meets Oscar MacGuire after Alessia De Luca leaves. When Skye Peters mentions Oscar was with another girl at the party, Tanya walks off.
22–31 March	Drew Panton	Govinda Roser-Finch	Drew attends Lindsay Ford's beach party. Lindsay pays him $50 to make advances towards Olivia Fraser Richards, with the intention of taking a photograph of them together to provoke Hunter King. Drew later tells Olivia that he does not even like Lindsay and only came to the party for the free alcohol. He also tells Olivia that Lindsay paid him to kiss her.
19 April–8 June	Dom Loneragan	Lindsay Farris	Dom is a photographer friend of Ricky Sharpe. She asks him to photograph her wedding to Nate Cooper. Dom flirts with Phoebe Nicholson. Dom is hired to take photos at the hospital fundraiser event at the caravan park, where he also continues to flirt with Phoebe. Both Dom and Phoebe survive the explosion, and he supports her when her friends are killed. Dom and Phoebe share a kiss, but when she overhears him telling someone he loves them on the phone, she assumes he has a girlfriend. Dom explains that he has a daughter, Bella, and he brings her to meet Phoebe at the diner. Bella reacts badly when Dom and Phoebe tell her they are a couple, but she later gives them her blessing. Dom's wife Tess brings Bella to the Bay to see him. Dom tells Phoebe that Tess cheated on him while she was away with the Navy. Phoebe realises that Dom is still in love with Tess and breaks up with him, so he can be with his family.
20 April	Womma	Dean Kyrwood	Kat Chapman and Martin Ashford pay Womma a visit, after learning Dylan Carter has paid him to trash businesses and intimidate witnesses.
21 April–9 March 2020	Sergeant Phillip McCarthy	Nicholas Cassim	After Sergeant Mike Emerson is promoted, McCarthy is sent to Summer Bay as his replacement. Katarina Chapman comes to McCarthy to report Dylan Carter for assault. McCarthy tells Kat that Dylan denied hitting her and that the OPP want Dylan to remain on the Charlotte King murder case. McCarthy tells Kat to come to him if she has any problems at work.
12 May–8 June	Bella Loneragan	Teagan Croft	Bella is Dom Loneragan's daughter. Dom brings her to the diner to meet Phoebe Nicholson. Bella is initially hostile towards Phoebe, and tells her that she does not want a new mother. Phoebe convinces her that she just wants to be her friend and Bella tells her she is not so bad after all. Dom and Phoebe tell Bella they have decided to start dating and she reacts badly. Dom makes her apologise, but erases photos of Phoebe from Dom's camera, unaware that there are other photos on the SD card. When Dom tells Bella off, she runs away to Phoebe's house and finally gives Dom and Phoebe's relationship her blessing. Bella's mother, Tess Loneragan, brings Bella to the Bay to be with Dom and Phoebe.
16 May	Alexandra Newman	Kate Fraser	Alexandra is rushed into hospital when her baby is in fetal distress. She gives birth to a girl and names her baby after Nate Cooper and Tori Morgan.
16 May	Natalie Newman	Uncredited	Alexandra is rushed into hospital when her baby is in fetal distress. She gives birth to a girl and names her baby after Nate Cooper and Tori Morgan.
17 May 2016 – 10 April 2017	Dr Bernice Chung	Karen Pang	Dr Chung conducts interviews for the head of emergency position at the hospital, alongside Dr Ben Dawson. Dr Chung prescribes Roo Stewart diazepam for stress. Roo later asks Dr Chung if she can write her another prescription as she accidentally threw the bottle out. The following year, Dr Chung calls Nate Cooper to the hospital to talk about a case of medical negligence in Billie Ashford's death. Dr Chung tells Tori that they need to make financial cuts across the hospital, and that Tori will have to fire one doctor in her department. Dr Chung picks Nate, but Tori chooses Anna Griffin. When Dr Griffin files a complaint against Tori, because she is in a relationship with Nate, he tells Dr Chung that he will take redundancy.
30 May	Andrew	Uncredited	Andrew and Kathy are brought to the hospital with gunshot wounds following an armed robbery. Kathy panics when Andrew briefly flatlines but doctors are able to resuscitate him.
30 May	Kathy	Susan Boyd	Andrew and Kathy are brought to the hospital with gunshot wounds following an armed robbery. Kathy panics when Andrew briefly flatlines but doctors are able to resuscitate him.
31 May–8 June	Tess Loneragan	Sophie Roche	Tess is Dom Loneragan's wife and Bella Loneragan's mother. Tess drives Bella to Summer Bay to see Dom and she meets his new girlfriend, Phoebe Nicholson. Tess tells Dom she still loves him and has applied for shore leave from the Navy. She later informs Phoebe that she wants Dom back and that she spoke to Dom about. Tess spends the day with Dom and Bella.
7 June 2016–12 July 2021	Buddy the dog	Himself/Buddy	Buddy is the Morgan family's boxer dog. Raffy Morrison befriends Buddy when she moves in with the Morgans. Buddy finds a packet of methamphetamine pills that fell out of Brody Morgan's pocket and eats them. Raffy finds him lying on the floor and he is rushed to the vet, where he makes a full recovery. Willow Harris kidnaps Buddy after learning Justin Morgan has the money she hid in a car he was servicing. Justin admits he gave it to the police and she later returns Buddy. The animal actor, also named Buddy, died in May 2025.
9 June	Janette Davis	Beth Aubrey	Janette meets with John Palmer to let him know Skye Peters has been in contact with the DHS with a change of address. Janette explains that Skye does not have to tell John where she is as she is sixteen.
13 June, 20 February 2018	Nurse Erica	Claudia Barrie	Tori Morgan asks Erica to take a patient's chart to Nate Cooper, but Erica questions if Tori would prefer to do it as Nate is attractive. Tori later sees Erica talking about her with some other nurses and confronts her. Erica tells her that everyone thinks Tori is the reason Nate's marriage ended. Nate later announces to the staff that his marriage broke down due to long standing issues, not Tori. Erica attends to Maggie Astoni after she is admitted following a bad reaction to chemotherapy.
14 June–12 July	Lara Adams	Elle Harris	Lara turns up at the Morgan's house, surprising Mason Morgan, her ex-boyfriend. They spend the afternoon together, but Mason's brother Justin is not impressed that Lara knows where the family is. He later tells Lara to stay away from Mason and that he will stop her from seeing him if he has to. Lara comes to the hospital to see Mason and he rushes to get rid of her. She later sees him hugging Evelyn MacGuire and assumes they are dating, despite Mason reassuring her that they are just friends. Lara breaks up with Mason and he tells her his family are in witness protection. Mason and Lara continue seeing each other in secret, until she has to return to Brisbane. Lara later meets up with Spike Lowe and it emerges she is working for the people after the Morgans. Lara, Spike and Blaine Varden kidnap Mason. When the Morgan's attempt an escape, Lara helps free Mason. Lara is soon arrested by Decker and his police squad.
23 June–14 July	Danika Kulevski	Ash Ricardo	Danika is the supervisor for a group of teens carrying out community service on the beach. She confiscates Hunter King's phone. When he later tells her Jordan Walsh is dehydrated, she tells them to get on with their work. Danika later brings Jordan to his new foster parents John Palmer and Marilyn Chambers. Danika notices Nate Cooper at the beach and he asks her out to lunch. They have sex and start a casual relationship.
23 June–26 July	Jordan Walsh	Benny Turland	Jordan carries out community service at the beach, where he befriends Hunter King. Jordan becomes dehydrated and collapses. Hunter and his father Zac MacGuire help him, angering the supervisor, Danika Kulevski. Jordan admits that he has not drunk enough water and decides to carry on working. Danika brings Jordan to live with his foster parents John Palmer and Marilyn Chambers. John tries too hard to bond with Jordan. Hunter invites Jordan to a party at VJ Patterson's house and he invites his friends. Hunter gets drunk and becomes jealous when he sees Jordan talking to his girlfriend, Olivia Fraser Richards, so he starts a fight. Jordan punches Hunter and Zac breaks up the fight. When Hunter and Olivia argue, Jordan tells her that she deserves someone better. John and Marilyn find a pocket knife in Jordan's bag and question him about it, but he refuses to answer. Jordan stays at a friend's place and is angry when he sees John and Marilyn have called the police about him. Jordan soon opens up about needing the knife to protect himself while he slept on the streets. John offers Jordan a job at the juice bar and they bond. Jordan starts at Summer Bay High and Olivia invites him to the school charity sleep out. Jordan's father Aaron Walsh visits after getting out of prison and asks Jordan to move to the city with him, but Jordan declines. When John and Marilyn's house is burgled, Jordan realises his father has committed the act. Aaron later John and Marilyn's belongings back and apologises to them and Jordan. He tells Jordan that he has a job and Jordan decides to give him a second chance, so they leave for the city. Jordan says goodbye with John and Marilyn before moving back to the city with his father.
27 June	Sarah Smedley	Ella Rose Corby	Sarah is a med student. She wonders out loud who the group, which includes Mason Morgan, are going to be assigned to. When Mason mentions that his sister has got him paired with Nate Cooper, Sarah remarks that he is an amazing doctor. She then asks Mason if he is worried about making mistakes.
28 June–10 November	Burt "Simmo" Simmons	James O'Connell	Andy Barrett contacts Simmo about re-birthing cars to earn money. Simmo is hesitant, but Andy tells him he has a garage and Simmo later brings him a BMW. Simmo is impressed with Andy's work and agrees to keep bringing him cars. A few months later, Martin Ashford contacts Simmo to buy some marijuana for Caroline Stewart. When he learns Simmo and Andy re-birthed cars from the garage, he attacks him and Kat Chapman chases after Simmo. Ash arranges to meet with Simmo, who realises that the police are waiting to arrest him. He escapes and carjacks Phoebe Nicholson. Simmo photographs Ash and Kat together and blackmails them. He asks Ash to rebirth cars, but Ash attacks him. Simmo cuts the brake line on Ash's sister's car, before he has Ash beaten up.
29 June–20 September	Kevin Arthur "Spike" Lowe	Jason Montgomery	Spike follows Brody Morgan in his car and later watches Tori Morgan talk to Nate Cooper. He goes to the gym and asks Nate about the area, after introducing himself as Tim Mitchell. Spike watches Justin Morgan and later drugs Nate at the hospital with ketamine. He then goes to the Morgan's house and holds Tori hostage, threatening to hurt her if Justin refuses to give him a book, but neither Justin or Tori know what he is talking about. Justin tackles Spike and Tori uses pepper spray in Spike's face. Spike leaves and meets up with Mason Morgan's girlfriend Lara Adams and Blaine Varden. They kidnap Mason and hold his family hostage. When the Morgan's escape, Spike goes after Brody and pushes him down a bank, causing Brody to hit his head. Spike later shows up at the farmhouse and demands Justin give him the book his father compiled about the syndicate. He makes Justin and Phoebe Nicholson look for it and then tells them they have until the following day to get it for him. Spike trashes Brody's van and then gives Justin two more days to find the book or he will harm his family. After Justin gives Brody the book, the police arrest Spike and he tells Justin to say goodbye to Tori for him. Days later, Spike attempts to kidnap Raffy and Hope Morrison. Raffy is saved by Martin Ashford and Kat Chapman, but Spike drives off with Hope. He takes her to the hospital and attempts to kill Atticus Decker, but he is stopped just in time and arrested.
5 July 2016 – 2 February 2017	Nurse Gretchen	Vanessa Buckley	Gretchen thanks Nate Cooper for showing her around the hospital. She later runs into Tori Morgan with a trolley as she is hurrying to theatre. Gretchen checks over Mick Jennings after he suffers minor injuries during an arrest. She later finds the constable guarding him unconscious on the floor.
5 July	Beau Mitchell	Andrew Den	Andy Barrett pays Beau to help his brother Josh Barrett escape police custody. As Beau leads Josh from the court, he gives Josh the signal and Josh elbows him in the stomach and runs to Andy's car.
11–12 July	Blaine Varden	Ashley Lyons	Blaine comes to Salt looking for Brody Morgan, but Phoebe Nicholson tells him Brody is not around. Blaine, along with Spike and Lara Adams, later pick Mason Morgan up from the side of the road. Blaine threatens him with a gun, demanding to know where the rest of his family are. Blaine holds the Morgans hostage and details how he shot their parents and demands that Justin Morgan give him a book. Justin tackles Blaine, giving everyone a chance to escape. The police soon arrive and arrest Blaine.
12 July–1 December	Atticus Decker	John Adam	Decker is a federal police officer and the Morgan family's witness protection handler. When Blaine Varden holds the family hostage, Tori Morgan manages to contact Decker and he turns up to rescue them. Decker later arrests Spike Lowe. Decker believes there is a mole inside the police force and gives Justin Morgan an address. Justin refuses to help, so Decker gives a letter to Phoebe Nicholson to pass on to Justin. Decker is deliberately run off the road and he suffers serious head injuries. Brody asks Decker how he knew his mother, but Decker can only utter the word Sparrow before losing conscious. Justin goes to the address and finds Decker's nieces Hope and Raffy Morrison. Spike kidnaps Hope and brings her to the hospital, with the intention of killing Decker with a lethal injection. Spike is stopped, but Decker goes into cardiac arrest and has to be resuscitated. When his brain swelling decreases, Tori attempts to wake Decker, but he goes into respiratory arrest and lapses back into a coma. He later wakes and tells Brody that he had an affair with his mother. Decker leaves the hospital after learning his life is still in danger. He comes to tell Brody that he and his siblings are safe. Brody works out that Raffy is Decker's daughter and the Morgan's half-sister. Weeks later, Decker returns to tell Justin that he knows who the corrupt police officer is and that the drugs syndicate is close to being brought down. Decker also spends time with Raffy. While talking with Kat Chapman about the Morgan's situation, Decker is shot. He dies after undergoing surgery.
13 July 2016 – 10 May 2018, 19 February 2019	Doctor Genner	Jennifer White	Doctor Genner looks after Brody Morgan after he has been injured by Spike Lowe. She treats him again after he injures his leg in the aftermath of the plane crash, stabilising him for surgery. After Tori Morgan is admitted to the hospital, Doctor Genner informs her that she has a high level of potassium in her system. Doctor Genner treats Maggie Astoni, who is admitted after a fall. She later treats Hunter King for a head injury after he is involved in a scuffle with smugglers on the wharf. The following year, Doctor Genner attends to Willow Harris after she is shot. The character's first name is variously given as Kate, Jennifer, Elizabeth and Faye in dialogue and credits.
20–26 July	Aaron Walsh	Justin Smith	Aaron turns up at the Palmer house to see his son, Jordan Walsh. He brings Jordan a birthday present and asks him to move to the city with him, but Jordan decides to stay with John Palmer and Marilyn Chambers. Aaron was upset that Jordan chose to stay with John and Marilyn, rather than him and Aaron vandalised John and Marilyn's house and stole some of their stuff. The police finds him and brings him to the station for questioning. Aaron denies of involvement and isn't charged. Jordan accused him for robbing the house. Jordan confronts him at Salt and claims to Aaron that he doesn't him again. Soon, Aaron returned John and Marilyn's stuff back and Aaron apologized to them and Jordan. He tells Jordan that he has a job and Jordan decided to give him a second chance and they left Summer Bay, and moves back to the city.
1 August	Professor Calabra	Grant Lyndon	Professor Calabra interviews former police officer Kat Chapman for a lecturing job at the university. He offers her the job, but then withdraws it after learning she was in a relationship with a criminal and invested in his business.
25 August 2016 – 18 May 2017	Kate Lee	Lucia Mastrantone	Kate is the mother of Justin Morgan, Tori Morgan, Brody Morgan and Mason Morgan. She and her husband Koby were killed by a drugs syndicate. Following a plane crash, an injured and dehydrated Brody sees Kate in a hallucination. Brody continues to dream about Kate, and later recalls an argument he heard between her and Atticus Decker. The Morgans later learn that Kate had an affair with Decker and gave birth to Raffy Morrison. Brody hallucinates Kate again when he is withdrawing from methamphetamine.
29 August	May	Kelly Butler	May is Matt Page and Eloise Page's aunt who looks after Elly after her father is sent to prison. May abuses Elly and she runs away. Matt invites May to Salt and she tells him that he can have her.
1 September	Brian Dyson	Sean Hawkins	Chris Harrington sets Brian and Derek up on a blind date with Phoebe Nicholson and Katarina Chapman after they split from their boyfriends. Though the date goes well, when Phoebe and Kat invite them over they find them shirtless and they ask the girls to play. They then ask them to leave.
1 September	Derek Babcock	Patch May	Chris Harrington sets Brian and Derek up on a blind date with Phoebe Nicholson and Katarina Chapman after they split from their boyfriends. Though the date goes well, when Phoebe and Kat invite them over they find them shirtless and they ask the girls to play. They then ask them to leave.
1 September	Mia Whyte	Debra Ades	After failing a date at Salt, Mia sees Chris Harrington spying on a group and he tells her that he set them up on a blind. They get on well but he is called into work. Whilst he is cleaning at The Diner she comes in and asks for a caramel slice and a Chris burger. She tells him that she prefers this food over the restaurant at the Sands that she runs. They kiss but Chris realises he’s not over his deceased girlfriend and asks her to leave.
6 September	Jeremy Glanville	Adam Franklin	Jeremy is dining at Salt when he notices Kat Chapman and whistles at her. She tells him off for harassment. Jeremy later offers to double her tips if she has a drink with him. Phoebe asks him to leave and Jeremy pinches her bottom. He goes to grab Kat, who twists his arm behind his back and slams him into the counter, injuring his nose. Jeremy makes a complaint to the police, but withdraws it when he is threatened with a charge of sexual harassment.
8 September–20 October	Caroline Stewart	Nicole Shostak	Caroline is Duncan Stewart's ex-wife and she brings their son Bryce to the Bay to see his father after she learns that he was involved in a plane crash. Caroline meets Tori Morgan and asks how she and Duncan know each other, before she is reunited with Duncan's father Alf Stewart and sister Roo Stewart. Alf is initially hostile towards Caroline, but after Bryce refuses to talk to him because of the way he is treating her, Alf and Caroline clear the air. Caroline becomes jealous of Duncan and Tori's relationship. She warns Tori to back off, causing Tori to break up with Duncan. He tells Caroline that he will not get back together with her. Caroline uses marijuana and panics when her bag falls into the sea. She visits Nate Cooper to talk about her condition, which she is keeping from Duncan, but Nate can only giver her some samples and not marijuana. While spending time with Alf, Bryce jumps off the pier to find Caroline's bag and Alf rescues him. Caroline blames Alf for not watching Bryce, but later apologises. Martin Ashford overhears Caroline asking Nate for marijuana and he buys her some. Bryce runs away when Caroline falls asleep after smoking marijuana. He is found by Tori and Duncan confronts Caroline about taking drugs, before deciding to sue for full custody. Caroline tells Roo that she has Huntington's disease and she decides to leave the Bay with Bryce. Duncan finds her at a motel and she tells him the truth. Caroline and Bryce return to Hawaii a week later, accompanied by Alf. Duncan flies out to be with Caroline when she hurts herself. In 2018, Caroline dies and Alf and Roo fly to the US to attend the funeral.
8 September–20 October	Bryce Stewart	Jack and Ace Long	
27 September	Juliette Ford	Rose Marel	Juliette is having lunch with her sister Tabitha Ford at the diner, when she notices Olivia Fraser Richards with Hunter King. Juliette introduces herself to Olivia and invites her and Hunter to her table for lunch. Juliette reveals that her parents are sending Tabitha to boarding school. Juliette and Tabitha leave together, after Tabitha says goodbye to Olivia.
3–4 October	Damien Grogan	Aaron Cottrell	Phoebe Nicholson sees Damien is having car trouble and offers to take a look at the engine. Realising she does not know what is wrong, she asks Justin Morgan for help. He recognises Damien and fixes the car. Damien asks Phoebe out to dinner and she arranges a brunch date with him. Justin talks Damien out of the date, as he has feelings for Phoebe.
10 October	Richard Legrande	Peter Tregilgas	Richard is a renowned food critic, who comes to Salt. After sampling Brody Morgan's food, Richard asks to feature him in his magazine.
10 October	Guitarist	Nick Perjanik	The guitarist is hired to play at Salt. He takes a break, so Justin Morgan can play a song for Phoebe Nicholson.
17 October	Mrs Day	Kerry Woods	Mrs Day comes to Summer Bay Auto to collect her car from Martin Ashford.
20 October	Stephanie Suttle	Georgia Blizzard	Evelyn MacGuire sets Stephanie up on a date with Matt Page, but Stephanie prefers Mason Morgan and spends most of the evening flirting with him. She apologises to Matt and tells him that it is obvious Evie has feelings for him.
25–26 October	Rebekah Pops	Sophie Cox	Rebekah notices Hunter King is struggling with his revision for their English exam and she offers to sell him the exam paper for $300. Rebekah comes looking for Hunter at the diner, and tells Olivia Fraser Richards that he has agreed to buy the exam paper.
26 October 2016 – 6 March 2017	Samantha Webster	Cheree Cassidy	Samantha meets with Zac MacGuire at Salt, where he talks to her about his personal life. He later meets with her at a motel room. Zac continues to meet with Sam, who turns out to be his book editor. He organises a lunch so Sam can meet his wife Leah Patterson-Baker. Leah is uncomfortable when she learns Sam knows all about her personal life. Sam later speaks with Leah about the situation. Sam reads Zac's draft and then makes advances towards him, which he rejects. Zac returns to talk about what happened and Sam takes her bathrobe off in front of him. Zac asks Sam to keep their relationship professional, but she tells him his book has been rejected by the publishers. A few months later, Sam returns to the Bay and tells Zac that she wants him. They eventually have a one-night stand.
2 November	HSC Examiner	Christopher Galletti	The HSC examiner refuses to let Hunter King into the exam room, as he is late.
3 November	Shenae	Zoe Jensen	Shenae is Burt "Simmo" Simmons girlfriend. Martin Ashford discovers Shanae asleep when he breaks into Simmo’s house to delete incriminating photos of Katarina Chapman. When Shenae walks into the same room as Ash, he covers her mouth and tells her to be quiet whilst the police are here and after they leave Ash runs off.
10–30 November	Zoe Gardner	Kat Risteska	While she is enjoying a drink at Salt, Zoe notices Matt Page and she gives him her phone number. A few days later, Zoe meets Matt in the Surf Club and he introduces her to his sister and Evelyn MacGuire, before she invites him to go swimming with her. Zoe and Matt start dating, but he later breaks up with her.
10–24 November	Randall Woods	Paul Ceaser	Randall follows his daughter Jeannie to Brody Morgan's house and confronts him. Once he has calmed down, Randall sits down to talk. Jeannie tells Randall how she met Brody. Randall later returns to tell Brody that Jeannie is going away for a while, and that he cannot allow her to be with him, as he does not share the same beliefs. Randall later follows Jeannie to Brody's restaurant, where he and Brody get into an argument.
1 December 2016 – 1 February 2017	Ranae Turner	Sacha Horler	Ranae is assigned to be the Morgan siblings' temporary witness protection officer, after Atticus Decker is shot and killed. She questions Kat Chapman about the Morgan's situation and later makes a call, telling the shooter to move on to the next target. Kat later hands Ranae a USB stick that belonged to Decker, claiming that a doctor at the hospital gave it to her. Ranae checks out the story and realises Kat knows she is working for the drugs syndicate. She takes shots at the Morgan house and chases after Kat and Justin Morgan. Justin later returns to the house for the real USB stick and is held hostage by Ranae, who tells him she ordered the hit on his father. The police arrive before Ranae can shoot Justin. Ranae is next seen at the court trial for the syndicate, where she and her associates are found guilty of all charges. She tells Justin that it is not over and she threatens him. Ranae later escapes house arrest and arranges for Tori to be kidnapped, so Justin will come after her. Ranae stabs Justin, but when she learns he is still alive, she disguises herself as a nurse and gives him an overdose of insulin. Ranae is arrested as she tries to escape.
8 December	Detective Geddes	Julia Billington	After human remains are found out in the Blue Mountains, Detective Geddes brings in Heath Braxton and questions him about his last interaction with Trevor Gunson, as he previously stated they fought in the same area. Geddes believes Heath killed Gunson and urges him to confess, but he refuses. Geddes later tells Heath that the remains belonged to a lost bush walker.
8 December	Prosecutor	Alan Dukes	The prosecutor meets with Justin Morgan and Kat Chapman, as they arrive at the court for the trial of Ranae Turner and the drugs syndicate, who killed Justin's parents. He asks if they are ready and Kat tells him that they have been over Justin's testimony. The prosecutor notices Justin is tense and assures him that the hearing is going well so far. He tells Justin that the defence will try to discredit him. After Justin testifies, the prosecutor tells him and Kat that the judge has made his decision.
8 December	Defence Lawyer	Leof Kingsford-Smith	The defence lawyer questions Justin Morgan about Detective Atticus Decker's suspicions there was a police insider working with the drugs syndicate. He asks how Justin was able to identify his client Ranae Turner as the insider and Justin tells him about finding Decker's USB stick with all the information he had gathered. The defence points out that the woman in the photos only has a passing resemblance to Ranae. He remarks that Justin is only testifying in order to protect himself from prosecution over his involvement in the syndicate. He withdraws this statement when the prosecution objects.
8 December	Judge	Martin Portus	The judge presides over the trial of Ranae Turner and her associates from a drugs syndicate, who are accused of murdering the Morgan family's parents and Detective Atticus Decker. After hearing Justin Morgan's testimony, the judge tells the court that the evidence against Ranae and her associates is substantial and significant, and he finds them guilty of all charges.
8 December	Bailiff	Kelly Blanco	The bailiff asks the court to rise as the judge returns with his verdict.
8 December	Mossy	Sam Lyndon	A River Boy and friend of Heath Braxton, who finds him outside the Surf Club. He tells Heath that he got out of prison a few months ago and is headed up the coast for some surfing. He invites Heath to come with him, which Heath initially turns down, until Mossy jokes about his wife not wanting him to go. Heath's wife Bianca Scott later finds him and Mossy drinking at Salt, and Mossy quickly leaves. He makes a phone call to someone, telling them that Heath has no idea and if the money keeps coming, he will continue to keep an eye on him.
8 December 2016 – 25 April 2018	Nina Gilbert	Zoe Naylor	As Nina is returning home, she sees her former partner Justin Morgan at her front door. She expresses her anger at Justin's disappearance from her and their daughter's lives for seven years. Justin tells Nina that he and his family were in witness protection, but she does not believe him and tells him that he is not allowed to see Ava. Nina later comes to Summer Bay to see Justin after reading about his family in the press. She asks him to explain everything that has happened in the last seven years. After speaking with Justin's sister Tori, Nina agrees to let Justin see Ava. While Nina and her husband Brian Gilbert go on holiday, Nina sends Ava to stay with Justin. Months later, Nina and Brian go on a cruise and she sends Ava to stay with Justin for a few weeks, but Nina later finds out Ava was kidnapped and she cuts her holiday short to collect Ava from Justin. She tells him he is not fit to be a father and tells Willow to break up with Justin, so he can see Ava. Nina later calls Justin to look after Ava for a while, following her split from Brian.
12 December	Marco	James Caitlin	Raffy Morrison overhears Marco and Steve criticising her family and accusing them of being dodgy and druggies, following the revelation that they were in witness protection. She defends her siblings and Marco tells her to get lost. Phoebe Nicholson tries to get her back inside, but not before Raffy calls Marco and the rest of the group idiots. Steve points out that Phoebe works for the family and Marco questions whether she likes working for "drug scum". Phoebe tells them that the Morgans are good people, who got caught up in a bad situation. Marco accuses Justin Morgan of being part of the syndicate, leading Phoebe to defend him and call him the bravest person she knows. She then threatens to call the police over the vandalism to the family's restaurant and the group leave, as Raffy calls them cowards.
12 December	Steve	Lance Rice	
13 December	Frank	Oliver Cooney	A firefighter who attends a fire at the Summer Bay Auto garage. He yells at Matt Page to get away from the flames.
15–19 December	Carl	George Banders	A man who watches the Morgans leaving their home for Atticus Decker's funeral. He later watches Tori Morgan and Brody Morgan from behind a tree as they leave the Surf Club. He makes a phone call and tells the person on the other end that Tori is alone and asks whether to do it now or later. He then follows her into Salt and, having put his arm in a sling, deliberately bumps into her and asks if she can help carry his pizzas to his car. Just as he pulls out a knife, Mason Morgan appears and Tori leaves with him. Carl later follows Tori as she drives out of town and pulls in front of her car, causing her to hit her head as she applies the brakes. Carl moves Tori into his car and hides hers, just as Kat Chapman comes down the road. Carl tells her he almost struck a Kangaroo and was just looking for it. He checks on Tori and uses her real name, suggesting he is with the drugs syndicate after her family. She kicks him and escapes into the bush with Carl following behind. He later finds her as she gets to her car and pulls her out. He gives her his phone and, after learning her brother has been kidnapped, she agrees to go with him and Carl brings her to Ranae Turner.
19 December	Jessica Mauboy	Herself	Mauboy performs at the Summer Grooves music festival, after receiving an invite from organiser Evelyn MacGuire.
19 December	Garbo	Luke Quinton	One of Ranae Turner's henchmen. He and another man find Justin Morgan lurking in the warehouse and bring him to Ranae. They then proceed to beat Justin up, until Justin fights back and escapes.
19 December 2016 – 30 January 2017	Festival DJ	Flexmami	The DJ plays in between sets at the Summer Grooves music festival, while the band provide backing music and vocals for Phoebe Nicholson during her performance.
19 December	Phoebe's Band	Interim	The DJ plays in between sets at the Summer Grooves music festival, while the band provide backing music and vocals for Phoebe Nicholson during her performance.
