= Hunter King (Home and Away) =

Fictional Australian soap opera character

- Home and Away character
- Portrayed by: Scott Lee
- Duration: 2015–2018
- First appearance: 27 July 2015
- Last appearance: 10 September 2018
- Introduced by: Lucy Addario
In-universe information
- Occupation: Student; Bait shop assistant
- Father: Wally Burns
- Mother: Charlotte King
- Grandfathers: Ernest King
- Grandmothers: Peggy King

Hunter King is a fictional character from the Australian soap opera Home and Away, played by Scott Lee. The actor did not think he would win the role, as he believed that he had performed badly in the audition. However, after receiving a callback, Lee was cast as Hunter and he began filming the following week. His casting was revealed when he attended the 57th Logie Awards alongside other Home and Away cast members. The role marks Lee's television acting debut. Reece Milne, who went on to play Tank Snelgrove in the show, also auditioned for the part. Lee made his first appearance as Hunter during the episode broadcast on 27 July 2015.

Hunter is portrayed as brooding, moody, and misunderstood. Hunter had a tough upbringing and was left without a male role model in his life upon his grandfather's death. His bad actions stem from his desire to have a family and be loved. Lee enjoyed exploring the similarities between himself and his character. Hunter's attitude began to change as he settled into Summer Bay, as he realised that his attitude was pushing people away. Hunter was introduced as the secret son of Zac MacGuire (Charlie Clausen). His presence caused Zac's relationship with Leah Patterson-Baker (Ada Nicodemou) to become strained, as he wanted his father all to himself.

Hunter's later storylines saw him kidnapped and drugged by Trystan Powell (Ben Mingay), and named as a suspect in his mother Charlotte King's (Erika Heynatz) murder. Lee said Hunter loved his mother, despite the many bad things she did. Hunter formed a romantic relationship with Olivia Fraser Richards (Raechelle Banno), as she helped him deal with his grief and bond with his family. The relationship was tested by Hunter's failure to plan for his future and an unplanned pregnancy. When they broke up in 2016, Lee hoped they would eventually reconcile, as he thought the pair were soulmates. In late 2016, Lee announced his intentions to leave Home and Away to pursue other roles. His character departed on 10 September 2018.

== Casting ==
Scott Lee's casting was revealed when he appeared alongside the Home and Away cast at the Logie Awards in May 2015. He had been filming with the show for around three months prior to his appearance. Two months later, Lee's casting as Hunter was officially announced. Lee told his agent that he did not think he would win the role, as he believed that he had performed badly in his audition. He later received a callback and started filming the following week. Actor Reece Milne also auditioned for the role of Hunter, before he was cast as Tank Snelgrove a month later. The role marks Lee's television acting debut. Lee commented that joining the cast was "very exciting", and he told Kaylee Martin of The West Australian: "It's Home and Away, you grow up watching it and I just thought 'if I'd ever get on that show, it would be so out of this world'. It was really bizarre and strange walking past Ray Meagher and all the people who have been on there that you grow up watching, I'm over the moon." Lee made his first appearance as Hunter during the episode broadcast on 27 July 2015.

== Development ==
=== Characterisation ===
Ahead of his first appearance, Lee described Hunter as being "angsty, brooding and moody". Lee told Stephen Downie of TV Week that Hunter's actions stem from his desire to have a family and be loved by them. His grandfather's death left him without a "solid" male role model in his life, and Lee thought Hunter was "searching for support." Lee also thought Hunter was misunderstood, saying "he may seem very disrespectful, but at the end of the day he is a hurt soul..." The actor also said Hunter had "a bit of a temper" and that his issue stem from his tough upbringing. Lee found Hunter's "bad guy" persona fun to play, as he was nothing like that in real life. He explained, "Hunter is very misunderstood and treads on people's toes in a big way, when you get the chance to do something different that's away from yourself it's really cool."

Lee also enjoyed exploring the similarities between himself and his character, especially with Hunter's background being quite different to his own. As he settled into the Bay, Hunter's attitude started to change. Lee explained that Hunter realised that he cannot continue to act in the same manner, as he was pushing those around him away. Since Hunter just wanted to be loved and have a good life, he knew that he had to change what he was doing to make that happen. Lee told Kerry Harvey of Stuff.co.nz that Hunter's emotions often took over and he forgot to stop and look at what he had. He also advised his character to stop being "so aggressive" and relax.

=== Introduction ===
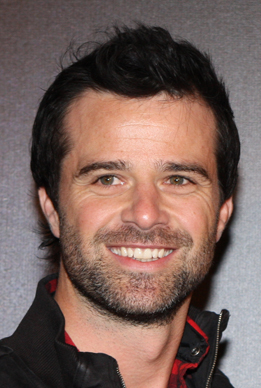
Hunter comes to Summer Bay meet his father, Zac MacGuire, played by Charlie Clausen (pictured).

Lee told Peter Way of the Macarthur Chronicle Wollondilly that Hunter's arrival would cause trouble between some of the established couples within the show. After following his mother, Charlotte King (Erika Heynatz), to Summer Bay, Hunter burns down Leah Patterson-Baker's (Ada Nicodemou) house and assaults Josh Barrett (Jackson Gallagher) after breaking into Summer Bay House. Hunter then asks to meet his father Zac MacGuire (Charlie Clausen), who resides in the town. Hunter later shows up to a community fundraising banquet for Zac and his fiancée Leah, and he reveals that he is Zac's son. Lee explained that Hunter had begun to feel invisible and was no longer able to stand by and watch Zac with his "other family". He also said Hunter was often impulsive and did not think about the consequences of his actions. Zac is shocked by Hunter's revelation and demands answers from Charlotte, who confirms that Hunter is telling the truth. As Zac struggles to understand why Charlotte kept Hunter a secret from him, he ends up rejecting his son. Lee called Zac's bad reaction "a massive slap in the face" for Hunter, and added, "he's waited his whole life to meet his father – he just wants to be a normal kid with a loving family."

Hunter's presence causes strain in Zac and Leah's relationship, as he makes it clear to Leah that he wants his father all to himself. Nicodemou explained that Leah does not trust Hunter and although she feels that she should be more accepting, she is uncomfortable around him. Leah also believes that Hunter is trying to get between her and Zac. After voicing her concerns to Zac, he refuses to believe his son is deliberately causing trouble for them. However, Hunter soon "makes a spectacle" by pretending to drown in the sea, leading Zac to miss a meeting with Leah. Nicodemou commented, "After Leah hears that Hunter didn't want to go to hospital, she thinks it was just a plot to get his mum and dad back together. Of course Zac is very upset when she suggests this – she's accused Hunter of things before, and Zac feels she should trust him by now." Leah comes to realise that Zac may be forced to choose between her and Hunter in the future, so she decides to end their engagement, believing that it the best thing for her family. Hunter eventually starts to see Zac and Leah as his second family instead of something that he has to break up.

=== Kidnap and Charlotte's murder ===
In November 2015, Hunter was involved in his mother's blackmail storyline. Charlotte was being threatened by Trystan Powell (Ben Mingay), who wanted her to find evidence that Darryl Braxton (Steve Peacocke) was still alive. When Charlotte fails to find out any information, Trystan has Hunter kidnapped. Lee told Stephen Downie of TV Week that Hunter goes out to clear his head when he is grabbed by two men. He knows something weird is going on with his mother, and thinks that this has something to do with it. Hunter is dragged into a waiting car and drugged. His stepbrother VJ Patterson (Matt Little) witnesses everything and tries to chase the car, but it pulls away. VJ then alerts Zac and Leah to Hunter's kidnapping and they contact the police. Meanwhile, Hunter wakes up alone in the bush and suffering with the effects of the chloroform used to knock him out. Lee explained, "He is disorientated, confused, and he doesn't know where he is. Waking up in the middle of the bush is a terrifying thing to happen to someone." Hunter manages to stumble through the bush until he is within sight of the road, and when he thinks he hears a car approaching he tries to walk towards the sound. But still suffering from being drugged, Hunter collapses. Downie noted that things did not look good for Hunter, as he needed medical attention and was at risk of exposure after spending a night in the bush. Constable Kat Chapman (Pia Miller) eventually finds Hunter.

After Charlotte dies from being shot by a mystery assailant, a whodunnit storyline began and Hunter was named as one of ten suspects. When Kat comes to Summer Bay House with news of Charlotte's death, Hunter is not there as he has briefly left town. When he returns home, he learns of his mother's death and "shuts down and goes numb". Lee continued, "In time these feelings that he's suppressed will comes out, but I think his first stage of grieving is to not deal with it – it's too much to handle." The actor pointed out that Hunter did love Charlotte, explaining that she was his only parent for a large part of his life and while they had some "challenging times" before her death, she was still his mother. Producers introduced Detective Dylan Carter (Jeremy Lindsay Taylor) for the plot, and he immediately begins questioning anyone who had a reason to want Charlotte dead. Hunter is at the top of his list, and Carter thinks that Hunter is capable of killing his mother. Lee thought that there were plenty of things linking Hunter to Charlotte's murder, as they had "a close but turbulent relationship". Zac and Leah also suspect that Hunter could be responsible, having witnessed him losing his temper with Charlotte at their wedding. When asked by Sarah Ellis of Inside Soap if his character was a killer, Lee replied that Hunter easily loses control and was capable of doing some "extreme stuff without thinking of the consequences". He added that many viewers thought that Hunter was guilty and joked that his feelings were hurt by the speculation.

After Hunter learns Andy Barrett (Tai Hara) has confessed to murdering Charlotte, he plans to get revenge. Lee quipped, "Nothing is going to stop him." Hunter goes to the police station and demands to speak with Andy, but his request is refused. Downie (TV Week) observed that Hunter was a "ticking time bomb", while Lee said that his character suppressed his emotions in the wake of his mother's death. He also feels guilty that many of the bad things she did – such as killing his cousin Denny Miller (Jessica Grace Smith) – were done to protect him. Struggling to control his emotions, Hunter waits outside the station. When he sees Andy being led from his cell, Hunter grabs a pair of scissors and stabs him.

=== Relationship with Olivia Fraser Richards ===
"Hunter and Olivia have both been through a lot and they comfort each other. They're both quite lonely. I think you'd naturally gravitate towards someone like that if you've been through what they have."

— Lee on Hunter and Olivia's relationship.

Lee hoped Hunter would get a love interest at some point during his tenure, commenting "everyone wants a girlfriend!" Producers later established a friendship between Hunter and Olivia Fraser Richards (Raechelle Banno) following her return to the Bay two months later. While they are spending time together at the beach pool, Olivia asks Hunter not to look at her when she gets out of the water. However, Hunter "can't resist a peek" and is shocked when he notices Olivia's thighs are covered in scars. Hunter realises that Olivia is hiding something, and he later tells VJ about the scars, as he feels that he cannot talk to Olivia about it. VJ, who is competing with Hunter for Olivia's affections, takes the opportunity to tell Olivia that Hunter saw her scars and says he will be there for her. Olivia helps Hunter to deal with his mother's death and bond with his new family. Their relationship is tested by Hunter's failure to plan for the future, and the arrival of Lindsay Ford (Georgia Flood), who wants Hunter for herself.

Hunter surprises her with a romantic "high tea" picnic in the bush. Lee called the gesture "a bit cute". He also said that Hunter spends the day "feeling odd", but he does not get it checked out as he is stubborn. During the picnic, Hunter suddenly doubles over in pain and collapses. Unable to get a phone signal, Olivia leaves Hunter to run to the road and flags down the first car she sees, which happens to be Zac's. As Hunter's condition deteriorates, Zac manages to contact Doctor Nate Cooper (Kyle Pryor), who diagnoses Hunter with a tension pneumothorax. Lee told an Inside Soap writer that he was nervous about the scenes. He wanted them to look as accurate as possible, and was offered advice by a nurse on the set. Nate talks Zac through the procedure to ease Hunter's condition, but as Zac makes the incision with a knife, he is momentarily reminded of the attack he suffered in prison. Zac manages to get Hunter breathing again and he is later given the all-clear at the hospital.

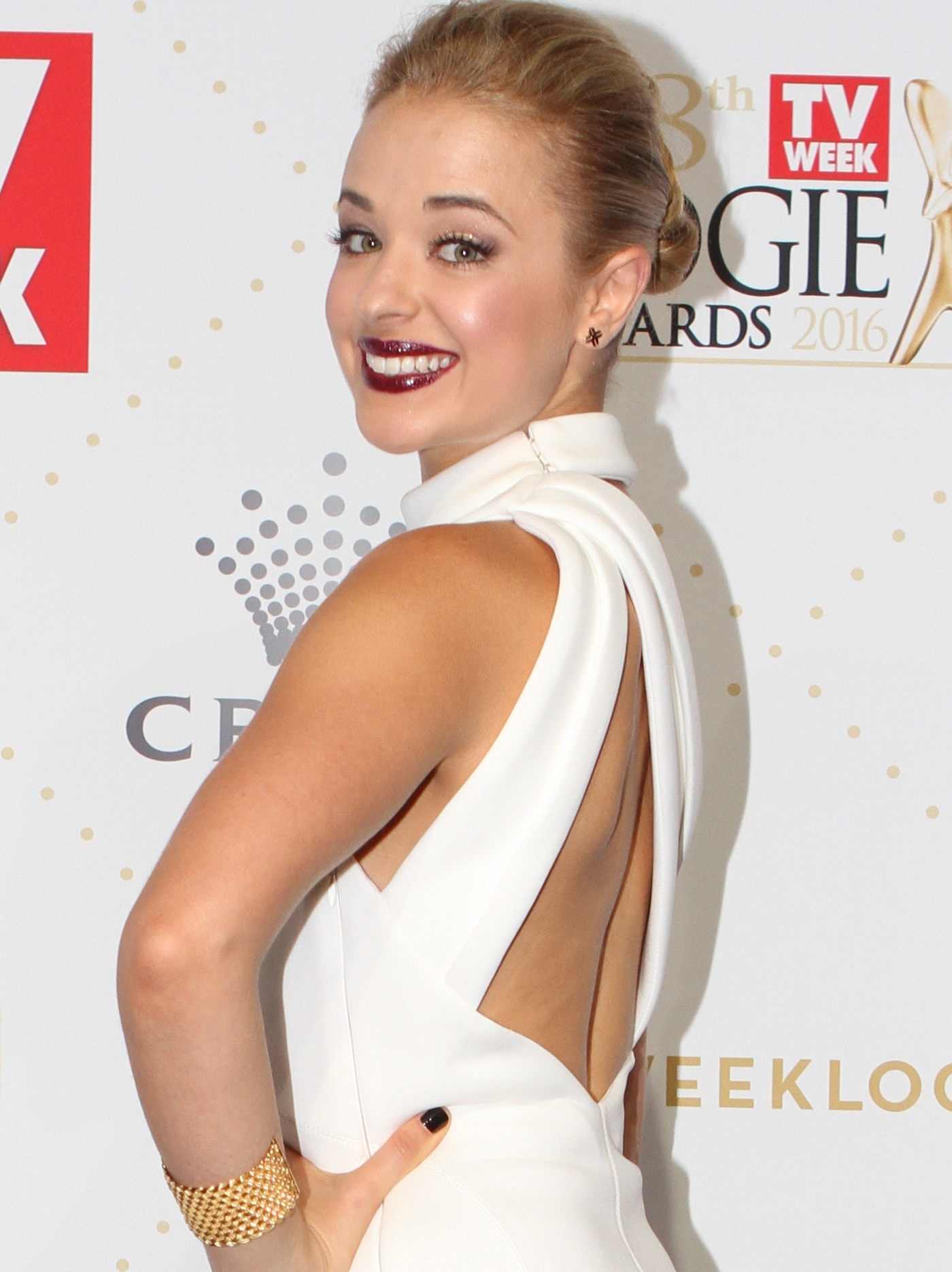
Hunter's first love interest is Olivia Fraser Richards, played by Raechelle Banno.

The "traumatic" experience brings Hunter and Olivia closer together. Banno said Olivia wants a fresh start, and the fact that their relationship is back on track means a lot to her. When Hunter tries to initiate sex, Olivia appears to be thinking about something else. Olivia organises another picnic for them both, but she is unable to tell Hunter what is bothering her and leaves the date early. Olivia then takes a pregnancy test and learns she is pregnant. When Hunter hears the news, his instinct is to flee, but he realises that he needs to face the situation with Olivia. Banno explained, "They're two 16-year-olds dealing with an adult issue. He was there for her and ready to make the decisions they needed to make together." Hunter and Olivia make the decision to have an abortion. Olivia struggles after the procedure and begins self-harming again.

Hunter punches Jordan Walsh (Benny Turland) in the face when he gets drunk at a party. The following day, Jordan tells Olivia that she deserves better, and she considers his advice, as Hunter's actions have really affected their relationship. Olivia attempts to reconcile with Hunter, but when she tells him what Jordan said, Hunter breaks up with her in a "jealous rage". Olivia then accepts that their relationship is over. The couple later reconciled, before breaking up again. Olivia was then paired with newcomer Mason Morgan (Orpheus Pledger). Banno said that Hunter and Olivia hope that they will reunite, but they both have this fear that they might not. The actress stated, "They broke up, not because they don't love each other anymore, but because they seemed a bit toxic around each other." When Hunter receives a job at the Bait Shop, he immediately tells Olivia and asks her to help him celebrate. When he notices a text message on her phone from Mason, they argue and Olivia says that she might be better off with Mason. During an interview with Kerry Harvey of Stuff.co.nz Lee thought Hunter's relationship with Olivia had calmed his character down. He said the couple were "soulmates", who would always love each other, but their relationship had become "a little bit co-dependent".

Hunter and Olivia later reunite and their relationship is immediately tested when VJ attempts to kiss Olivia. The plot begins with Olivia and Hunter taking VJ out to Salt in a bid to cheer him up, after he loses custody of his step-daughter. VJ drinks too much alcohol and he becomes verbally abusive towards Hunter. Olivia is trying to calm VJ down when he kisses her. Hunter and VJ fight, forcing Olivia to separate them. She then "goes ballistic" at Hunter, causing tension between them. Hunter decides to propose to Olivia, and he purchases an engagement ring while he is drunk. Lee thought that his character was serious about his love for Olivia though. While they are dining at Salt, Hunter places the ring in Olivia's champagne glass, but it gets knocked to the floor and she believes the ring belongs to someone else. Lee said Hunter is "a bit embarrassed", especially when Olivia calls the ring "ugly". The incident prompts Hunter to plan the proposal out properly. However, Lee did not want Hunter to go through with it, as he believed the couple were no longer compatible, stating, "Once upon a time, I would have said that Hunter and Olivia were perfectly suited. But their lives have taken different directions – and I don't think they complement each other in a healthy way." Hunter organises a second proposal. He makes "a heartfelt speech" about their relationship in front of their friends, but Olivia rejects him and leaves the beach.

=== Departure ===
In the 24 December 2016 – 6 January 2017 edition of TV Week, Lee confirmed that he would be leaving the show at the end of 2017 to pursue his acting career in the United States. Lee stated, "I'm excited. The times I've had has gone so quickly and I've learnt a lot as an actor." Hunter departed on 10 September 2018. His exit storyline sees him leave the Bay to join Zac in Vietnam. Lee said, "He wants a fresh start. Nothing's going right in his life, so making this move could really help." Lee's departure came shortly after Banno also departed the serial. Lee explained that he and Banno thought they would leave together, as their characters were involved for so long, but he liked that they received their own exits, as it allowed them to "stand on their own two feet." Lee also liked that his final scene had his character receiving advice from Alf. He added, "I'll never forget it. Home and Away has been such a special period of my life."

== Storylines ==
After spending days following Zac MacGuire and Leah Patterson-Baker around Summer Bay, Hunter breaks into Summer Bay House and rummages through their drawers. Josh Barrett catches him and Hunter knocks him down the stairs. VJ Patterson gives chase and manages to pull Hunter's backpack off of him. Hunter then visits his mother, Charlotte, at her motel room and tells her he is done waiting and wants to meet Zac, his father, now. She realises that he set fire to Zac and Leah's house and sends him away. Upon his return, Hunter finds Zac and reveals that he is his son. VJ confronts Hunter about pushing Josh down the stairs and they fight. Zac and Hunter bond over a shared interest in basketball. Hunter has trouble accepting Leah and VJ as part of his life. He manipulates Zac into spending more time with him, causing a strain on Zac and Leah's relationship. After arguing with them about his behaviour, Hunter breaks into Leah's diner and steals the safe. He accidentally exposes some electrical wiring and knocks over a bucket of water, causing Marilyn Chambers (Emily Symons) to suffer a serious electric shock. Hunter feels guilty, but Charlotte refuses to let him go to the police and instead sends him to stay with his grandmother for a few days.

Hunter promises Zac that he will try to be a better son. He soon learns Charlotte has been having sex with Matt Page (Alec Snow), a high school student, and that she has stolen money from his trust fund. He moves out of their apartment and stays with Zac and Leah. Hunter is abducted by Trystan Powell, who wants revenge on Charlotte. He is drugged and left in the bush. Hunter is eventually rescued by Kat Chapman. Hunter begins a relationship with Olivia Fraser Richards. When he learns that Charlotte plans to reveal he was behind the fire at Leah's house and that she killed his cousin, Denny Miller, Hunter leaves the Bay after flagging down passing motorist, Lindsay Ford. On his return, Hunter finds out his mother has died. He finally admits that he caused the fire at Leah's house during Billie Ashford's (Tessa de Josselin) arson trial. He is later accused of his mother's murder. Lindsay tries to break up his relationship when she tells Olivia that she and Hunter kissed. Lindsay takes Alf Stewart's (Ray Meagher) ute and knocks Hunter over when he tries to stop her. He later suffers a collapsed lung during a picnic with Olivia, and Zac performs an emergency procedure to get him breathing properly again.

Olivia falls pregnant and she and Hunter decide to have an abortion, as they are not ready to be parents. Hunter and Olivia's relationship is strained and she starts self-harming again. Hunter stabs Andy Barrett after learning he was responsible for Charlotte's death. Hunter is arrested and given community service work. He later learns Andy's brother Josh shot his mother. Hunter befriends Jordan Walsh during his community service and invites him to a party at The Farmhouse. Hunter gets drunk and fights with Jordan, leading to the break up of relationship with Olivia. Olivia's new friend Tabitha Ford (Eliza Scanlen) warns Hunter to stay away from her, before she begins manipulating Olivia. Tabitha frames Hunter when she accesses school records and changes his exam score, resulting in his suspension. Olivia eventually ends her friendship with Tabitha, who seeks revenge. She dresses in a similar style to Olivia, enters Hunter's caravan at night and kisses him in the hope of breaking up his friendship with Olivia. Hunter rescues Olivia when Tabitha poses as Olivia's abuser on social media. Olivia and Hunter reconcile. Hunter becomes stressed about his final exams and his lack of plans for university. He is also tempted to cheat when he is offered the English exam paper.

Olivia asks that they take a break from their relationship. Hunter clashes with John Palmer (Shane Withington), when John fails him during his Bronze Medallion exam. Hunter smashes John's walkie talkie after he bumps into him. When a fire breaks out at the caravan park, Hunter is blamed, but John soon realises that he caused the fire and apologises. Hunter later finds John collapsed outside the surf club and he and Olivia call an ambulance. Hunter becomes jealous when Olivia begins dating Mason Morgan. When a bush fire breaks out and heads towards the Summer Grooves music festival, Hunter risks his life to find Olivia and Mason. After escaping the fire, Hunter is injured when he returns to find Olivia, who later turns up safe. The police bring Hunter in for questioning about the recent cases of arson around the town. Hunter fights with Mason, and later suggests to Olivia that they should stay away from each other. After Olivia breaks up with Mason, Hunter helps her out with her university nerves by asking Evelyn to give her a tour of the campus. Hunter and Olivia get back together. After they struggle to find time to see each other, Hunter suggests he and Olivia move in together and she agrees. They eventually find a place, but they are forced to clean it up. After they are burgled, Irene invites them to move in with her. Hunter and Olivia take out VJ to cheer him up, but when he gets drunk and tries to kiss Olivia, Hunter fights with him.

Zac falls from the roof of Summer Bay House and Hunter initially blames Leah, as Zac was trying to get her attention. When Zac makes a remark about when his break up with Charlotte occurred, Hunter starts to question his paternity. After learning Zac is planning to leave the Bay, he conducts a DNA test. When Zac says he wants Hunter to come with him, Hunter tries to stop VJ from posting the test, but he is too late. The results arrive and Hunter throws them away, before retrieving them and learning that Zac is not his father. After he tells Zac, he encourages him to leave the Bay. Hunter struggles with the revelation about his paternity and Olivia encourages him to stay in contact with Zac. Alf asks Hunter to help out with an event at the beach, and he clashes with Mason. After he tries to start a fight, Hunter breaks down and tells Mason about Zac. They apologise to each other. Hunter decides to look for his biological father and contacts his grandmother, Peggy King (Caroline Gillmer), who comes to the Bay. He tells her about Zac, but Peggy reacts badly and accuses Hunter of ruining Charlotte's life. Olivia makes things worse when she talks with Peggy, who tells the police about the Diner robbery, leading to Hunter's arrest. He and Olivia have a big argument. Hunter apologises to Irene, Marilyn and Leah, before learning that he will not be charged. Hunter and Peggy reconcile and she suggests that a former neighbour, Wally Burns (Julian Garner), could be his father. Hunter writes to Wally, but the letter is returned to him. However, Wally comes to the Bay and meets with Hunter. He tells him that he cannot be his father, as he is infertile. Hunter asks Wally to take a DNA test, before Wally leaves. He returns a few days later and reveals that a DNA test confirmed that he is Hunter's father. Hunter tries to bond with Wally, but finds that they do not have much in common.

== Reception ==
Following Hunter's early appearances, an Inside Soap writer commented, "From what we've seen of Hunter so far, it seems he could be big trouble!" Another writer for the publication called him a "creepy teenager". While Sarah Ellis branded him "volatile". Michael Cregan included the reveal of Hunter's identity in his feature on the top five moments for Tuesday 22 September 2015. Cregan wrote, "At last! The identity of the mysterious stranger lurking around Summer Bay is revealed tonight, and it's worth waiting for. Yes, the hooded stranger is none other than Charlotte's son, Hunter." Lee revealed that when fans met him in real life they appeared to be scared of him due to Hunter's actions.

Kerry Harvey of Stuff.com.nz said Hunter "upset locals and fans with his wicked ways." Both Kaylee Martin of The West Australian and Stephen Downie of TV Week branded Hunter a "bad boy". Martin also wrote "brooding teenager Hunter will be creating drama and shaking things up". Following Charlotte's death, a reporter for the South Wales Echo noted, "Hunter's world is turned upside down when he finds out about Andy's confession." In November 2015, 58% of TV Week readers voted that they liked Hunter and Olivia as a couple.

Of Hunter and Christina's chemistry, a South Wales Echo reported observed, "she's married, he's a hunk – and fate keeps throwing them together. Surely it's only a matter of time before one thing leads to another for Christina and Hunter." A writer for Liverpool Echo wrote, "Hunter has been having a tough time, so you would imagine that finally hearing Christina admit she made up her allegations would put a smile on his face. However, he had to trick her into it, so takes no pleasure." Summing up Hunter's time in the Bay, Tamara Cullen of TV Week stated "From a troubled teen to a loveable larrikin, Hunter's time in the Bay has been action-packed."
