= Dylan Carter =

Dylan Carter may refer to:

- Dylan Carter (swimmer) (born 1996), Trinidad and Tobago swimmer
- Dylan Carter (Home and Away), a character on the soap opera Home and Away
