= Anna Bamford =

Australian actress

- Born: 19 September 1989 (age 37); Sydney, New South Wales, Australia
- Occupation: Actress
- Years active: 2011–present

Anna Bamford (born 19 September 1989) is an Australian television and theatre actress. She won the role of Miranda Beaumont in Wonderland shortly after graduating from the Western Australian Academy of Performing Arts in 2012. For her performance, Bamford earned a nomination for the Logie Award for Most Outstanding Newcomer. After Wonderland was cancelled in 2015, Bamford made her major theatre debut in a production of Freak Winds. Later that year, she began appearing in Andrew Upton's production of The Present, which later transferred to Broadway. In 2016, Bamford joined the cast of Home and Away in the recurring role of Jeannie Woods.

== Early life ==
Bamford was born in Sydney. She grew up in Killara and attended Barker College. After taking a year off to travel, Bamford studied nursing for six months, before deciding that she wanted to be an actress. She moved to Perth to study at the Western Australian Academy of Performing Arts (WAAPA), graduating in 2012. Bamford appeared in various theatre productions while at WAAPA, including The Crucible and A Midsummer Night's Dream.

== Career ==
Shortly after graduating from WAAPA, Bamford secured the leading role of Miranda Beaumont in the Network Ten drama Wonderland. Miranda is a photographer, who moves in with fellow lead character Tom Wilcox (played by Michael Dorman) and becomes his love interest. For her portrayal of Miranda, Bamford was nominated for Most Outstanding Newcomer at the 2014 Logie Awards. Wonderland was cancelled after three seasons in 2015. Bamford also made a guest appearance in Miss Fisher's Murder Mysteries in 2013.

Bamford made her theatre debut in a production of Freak Winds at the Old Fitz Theatre in Woolloomooloo. She also became the Australian ambassador for beauty brand ModelCo. In August 2015, Bamford began appearing in Andrew Upton's production of The Present, alongside Cate Blanchett, Richard Roxburgh, Jacqueline McKenzie and Marshall Napier at the Sydney Theatre Company. She was also named as an ambassador for the Sydney Spring Carnival at the Randwick Racecourse, and a judge for Myer Fashions on the Field at the Spring Champion Stakes.

Bamford joined the cast of soap opera Home and Away as Jeannie Woods in 2016. She told Tiffany Dunk of the Herald Sun that she auditioned on a Friday and was on set filming her first scenes the following week. She was contracted for six weeks. Her character was introduced as love interest for Brody Morgan (Jackson Heywood). Bamford described their romance as being "sort of doomed from the start" as Jeannie comes from an unusual background.

The actress was named as the new ambassador for Australian skincare brand Dr LeWinn's in September 2016. Bamford made her Broadway debut in January 2017 when The Present transferred to the Ethel Barrymore Theatre in New York City with the entire original cast. She has also made guest appearances in the second season of comedy series Here Come the Habibs, and miniseries Underbelly Files: Chopper.

== Filmography ==
=== Television ===
| Year | Title | Role | Notes |
|---|---|---|---|
| 2013 | Miss Fisher's Murder Mysteries | Lola | |
| 2013–2015 | Wonderland | Miranda Beaumont | Series regular Nominated – Logie Award for Most Outstanding Newcomer |
| 2016 | Home and Away | Jeannie Woods | Recurring role |
| 2017 | Here Come the Habibs | Samantha | |
| 2018 | Underbelly Files: Chopper | Elizabeth Allman | |

=== Stage ===
| Year | Production | Role | Theatre | Notes |
|---|---|---|---|---|
| 2015 | Freak Winds | Myra | Old Fitz Theatre | |
| 2015 | The Present | Maria | Sydney Theatre Company | |
| 2017 | The Present | Maria | Ethel Barrymore Theatre | |
