= Brody Morgan =

Fictional character

- Home and Away character
- Portrayed by: Jackson Heywood
- Duration: 2016–2019
- First appearance: 7 June 2016
- Last appearance: 10 June 2019
- Introduced by: Lucy Addario
In-universe information
- Other names: Bartholomew Lee (birth name)
- Occupation: Chef; Restaurant owner
- Father: Koby Lee
- Mother: Kate Lee
- Brothers: Justin Morgan; Mason Morgan
- Sisters: Tori Morgan
- Half-sisters: Raffy Morrison
- Wife: Ziggy Astoni (2018–2020)
- Sons: Mason
- Nieces: Ava Gilbert; Grace Morgan

Brody Morgan is a fictional character from the Australian soap opera Home and Away, played by Jackson Heywood. The actor had previously appeared in the show as Lachie Cladwell in 2009. During the audition process, Heywood was paired up with several different actors until the producers found the right combination for the Morgan family. Heywood began filming his first scenes in December 2015. He made his first appearance as Brody during the episode broadcast on 7 June 2016.

Brody was introduced to the show along with his three siblings; Tori Morgan (Penny McNamee), Justin Morgan (James Stewart) and Mason Morgan (Orpheus Pledger). The family received immediate comparisons to the show's popular Braxton brothers. Brody is a passionate and ambitious chef. He is also portrayed as being loyal, smart, and occasionally pessimistic. For the first few weeks after their arrival, Brody and his siblings concealed the fact that they were in witness protection. They were later held hostage by their parents' killer and involved in a plane crash, which left Brody badly injured. Brody was originally created to be a gay character but the storyline was blocked by Seven Network. Jeannie Woods (Anna Bamford) was introduced as a love interest for Brody in late 2016.

The character became the focus of the show's first storyline about ice addiction, which was a prevalent issue in Australia at the time. Series producer Lucy Addario implemented the storyline, as she felt the show could no longer ignore it. Heywood carried out extensive research, so his portrayal of Brody would be as accurate as possible. Brody uses ice to help him cope with the pressures of running a restaurant. He soon gets into debt with his dealer, leading to major consequences for himself and his family. While recovering from his addiction, Brody begins a relationship with Bay newcomer Ziggy Astoni (Sophie Dillman), whom he later marries. The marriage ends when Brody begins an affair with Simone Bedford (Emily Eskell). The storyline led to the character's exit on 10 June 2019.

== Casting ==
On 5 December 2015, Jonathon Moran from The Daily Telegraph reported actors Jackson Heywood, James Stewart and Orpheus Pledger had joined the cast of Home and Away as brothers Brody, Justin and Mason Morgan respectively. All three began filming their first scenes during the following week, ahead of their on-screen debut in 2016. During the audition process for the Morgans, Heywood was paired with several actors until the producers found the right combination. He formed an immediate connection with Stewart, Pledger and Penny McNamee, who plays their sister Tori Morgan, and commented "It was really nice to see the ones I had the most connection with were the ones that were given the job."

Heywood had previously appeared in Home and Away as recurring character Lachie Cladwell in 2009. He explained that his first appearance in the show was "overwhelming", as it was his first professional acting job, but rejoining the cast alongside three other actors, meant that there was less pressure on him the second time around. The family drew immediate comparisons to the show's Braxton brothers, who were introduced to the show in 2011, which Heywood expected. He stated, "I can definitely see that, but I think we have a very different dynamic. It will be exciting to tell the story and as it will be revealed, it will be a very different story." Brody made his first appearance on 7 June 2016, alongside Justin and Mason.

== Development ==
=== Characterisation and introduction ===
Brody was originally created as the show's first regular gay male character. In 2022, the show's former script executive, Dan Bennett revealed that the storyline was blocked by Seven Network. Bennett also revealed that another character was supposed to be gay but they were forced to rewrite the scripts. He stated "one of the series regulars during my latest stint was designed to be gay, another to be larger set in frame... both were rebuked by the network."

Ahead of his screen debut, Heywood described his character as "quite jaded and somewhat pessimistic at times, deep down he always has the best intentions and a true heart of gold." He also thought Brody was "passionate" and loyal, with "a wonderful complexity of emotions". Brody's profile on the TVNZ Home and Away website states that he can occasionally be "a bit gruff" and he struggles to let people in. Brody is the second youngest Morgan sibling and he shares a close bond with Tori. The death of his parents affected him the more than the others. Heywood later called Brody "the most ambitious" member of the Morgan family, as well as the smartest and most reliable. He also said Brody was the most apprehensive about moving to Summer Bay, as he feels that the town will not provide him with many career opportunities. Elaborating further on the comparisons to the Braxtons, Heywood explained that the Morgan siblings had "a very different dynamic". They all had professions, and are not criminals. Brody is a successful chef and Heywood called him "a real craftsman".

Brody, his two brothers Justin and Mason, and their dog Buddy are driving to Summer Bay to join their sister Tori, who moved to the town five weeks before them, when they are almost involved in a car crash with Martin "Ash" Ashford (George Mason). Brody and Mason desperately try to keep Justin and Ash from fighting. The brothers continue their journey to the Bay, where they find Ash talking with Tori and Alf Stewart (Ray Meagher) on the beach and another fight almost breaks out, until Tori reveals that Justin, Brody and Mason are her brothers. The siblings wonder if they will be able to stay in their new home this time, leading to the start of their first major storyline.

=== Witness protection ===
"On surface level, the Morgan family appear to live a normal life but audiences will learn that they have a dangerous past and no one can find out who they really are. What is this new family hiding?"

— A Yahoo7 writer on the family's secret. (2016)

An Inside Soap columnist observed that the family had been hiding something about their past from the Bay's residents. They initially keep to themselves and Justin warns Tori against befriending local doctor Nate Cooper (Kyle Pryor). Stewart explained that there were a set of rules that the Morgans had to live by, which related to their secret, and Justin worries when Tori reveals that she told Nate their parents are dead. Mason's former girlfriend Lara Adams (Elle Harris) visits him in the Bay and he tells her that his family are in witness protection. Later that day, Brody informs his siblings that he is being followed, and Justin decides that the family need to pack up and leave.

After Spike Lowe (Jason Montgomery) turns up at their house and threatens Tori, the family contact their police liaison officer Atticus Decker (John Adam), who has them moved to a safe house. The family all agree that they are tired of running from the people who killed their parents. Brody is "so far in denial" about the situation that he continues planning menus for his recently purchased restaurant Salt. While he, Justin and Tori are arguing, they fail to notice Mason leaving the house to meet up with Lara, who is revealed to be working with Spike and Blaine Varden (Ashley Lyons), the Morgan's parents' killer. Spike and Blaine get Mason to tell them where the safe house is and the family are held hostage. Blaine produces a gun and threatens to kill them all, before revealing that Justin knew the truth about the circumstances that led to their parents' deaths.

Brody is one of nine characters involved in a plane crash. After receiving a warning from Spike, Justin realises that he has sabotaged the plane being used for Tori's birthday trip. He attempts to contact the pilot Duncan Stewart (Benedict Wall) to tell him to land the plane, but the radio communication between them is poor. Meanwhile, a broken pipe leaks carbon dioxide into the cabin. Justin calls Brody to ask him for the plane's coordinates, but he passes out. Duncan also loses conscious, but manages to crash land the plane in the sand first. While most of the passengers escape major injury, Mason soon realises that Brody is missing and he is presumed dead. After the passengers are rescued, Tori and Justin search the bush for Brody, along with Nate and Duncan. They soon find him, but realise he is in a serious condition.

Brody begins recalling memories of his mother arguing with somebody. Heywood said Brody does not remember his mother being an argumentative person, so the memories worry him. Brody turns to Decker for answers, but feels that the police officer is keeping something from him. He soon realises that Decker is the person arguing with his mother, leaving him "confused, angry and worried." The Morgans feel they cannot trust Decker anymore. Soon after, Decker is rushed to hospital when his car is run off the road and he is placed in a coma. Heywood commented, "The family now feel incredibly vulnerable, and it's a hugely traumatic experience. Decker has been like an uncle to them."

While Decker is in the hospital, the Morgans find and meet his nieces Hope (Jessica Falkholt) and Raffy Morrison (Olivia Deeble). When Decker eventually wakes from his coma, Brody asks him why he has a memory of him arguing with his mother. Decker tells Brody that he used to work as an undercover officer and that he was tasked with helping to bring down the drugs syndicate that Brody's father worked for. Heywood said Brody senses that Decker's secret is "something much bigger" than he first thought. Decker plans to leave town, and when Hope is arrested, the Morgans agree to look after Raffy. The Morgans later learn Raffy is Decker's daughter and their half-sister. They soon tell her the truth about being in witness protection because their parents were killed by drug dealers, a revelation that she struggles to cope with. The Morgan's secret is soon revealed to the rest of the Bay in the local newspaper, and Brody's restaurant is vandalised.

=== Relationship with Jeannie Woods ===
Producers introduced a love interest for Brody in early November 2016. Actress Anna Bamford joined the cast as Jeannie Woods for six weeks. Woods said Jeannie and Brody would form "an unusual relationship" while she was in the Bay. The actress added that she developed a good friendship with Heywood during filming. Jeannie comes to the Bay to take part in a charity volleyball match arranged by Evelyn MacGuire (Philippa Northeast). Brody bumps into her while he is making a food delivery to the event, but she disappears quickly into the crowd. Brody becomes determined to find her, but Bamford said that "things keep happening to stop Brody getting to her!" When Brody finally finds Jeannie, he sees she is playing volleyball with Matt Page (Alec Snow), so he offers Evelyn some money if he can switch places with Matt and partner Jeannie in the competition. Heywood thought Brody was attracted to Jeannie's natural charm and beauty, and said she takes Brody's "breath away".

Brody offers Jeannie a job as a waitress at Salt, which proves awkward for them both. Heywood described Brody as being "a blubbering mess" while he is around Jeannie. She later reacts badly to Brody's attempts at flirting with her, leaving him confused. Heywood admitted that Brody did not have much time for relationships while he and his family were in witness protection. He told TV Week's Stephen Downie, "He's been out of love and out of practice with women for so long, he completely forgets how to read females." At the end of Jeannie's shift, she thanks Brody for giving her the job and kisses his cheek. Brody misreads the situation and kisses her on the lips, causing her to push him into a trolley. Brody asks her to leave Salt, which Heywood called "a terrible reaction."

Jeannie later hides from her father at Brody's home, where she explains that her parents are doomsday preppers. She also tells Brody that she cannot live like her parents, who are preparing for the apocalypse. Heywood said Jeannie's background explains why she is "shy and closed off" around Brody. It also makes it harder for her to express her feelings to him. Brody initially struggles with the revelation, and questions whether he and Jeannie have a future together. Heywood thought there would be restrictions on her life that would not allow Jeannie to have a relationship. Later that night, Jeannie's father Randall Woods (Paul Ceaser) turns up at the house to take her away, as he does not want her to be with someone who is not one of "them". Brody and Jeannie's differences ultimately stop their relationship from progressing.

=== Drug addiction ===
"Home and Away is a prime-time television show, it has reach. So we felt obligated to keep it as accurate as possible so we could educate people on what (ice addiction) looks like."

— Heywood discussing the storyline's potential impact on viewers.

In the character's first issue-led storyline, Brody develops an addiction to methamphetamine or "ice". This was the first time the show had aired a long-running storyline about ice addiction, and at the time it was a prevalent issue in Australia, as demand for the drug had rapidly increased since 2013. Series producer Lucy Addario said the production crew could no longer ignore the subject, and along with the scriptwriters, she implemented the storyline for Brody, who begins using the drug to deal with the pressure of running a restaurant.

Heywood was pleased upon receiving the storyline, saying "I was like, 'Great' because it's such a switch but also really realistic because it does happen to people like that." Heywood carried out extensive research in order to accurately portray an ice addict, while avoiding any stereotypes. He read stories from former addicts, spoke with the show's on-set medic, and with his brother, who is a paramedic. Heywood also recalled his experiences of dealing with a friend who was addicted to heroin, and how that affected his relationships. As the show has an average audience of 1.27 million viewers, Heywood hoped that the storyline would help contribute to a social change.

The storyline begins shortly after Brody catches Mason's university friend Lena Ascot (Felicity McKay) selling drugs in his restaurant. He initially dislikes Lena, but later hires her as a waitress. When Brody catches Lena with drugs again, he tells her that his parents were killed by drug dealers and he fires her. Lena persuades Brody to rehire her ahead of a visit from restaurant critic Terry Diamond (Rob Flanagan). Lena offers Brody cocaine to make him feel calmer, however, Brody becomes over-confident and insults Terry when he give Brody constructive criticism. Heywood told Alison James of Soaplife that Brody feels "terrible" and he is acting out of character, which makes his brothers suspicious. Justin searches the storeroom and finds an empty drugs packet, which Brody denies is his. Justin makes Brody promise not to use drugs and to fire Lena again. When Lena texts Brody to ask if he wants more cocaine, Brody accepts and he tells Justin that they are just arranging for her to collect her paycheck.

Brody's continued cocaine use results in him staying out late and suffering from mood swings. When he arranges to meet Lena to buy more cocaine, he finds William Zannis (Caleb Alloway) in her place. Brody is initially reluctant to buy from Zannis, but he is "desperate". Before Brody can take the cocaine, his sister Raffy asks him to drive her to Yabbie Creek. Brody notices a police road block and turns around to avoid it. As the police give chase, Brody hides the cocaine in Raffy's bag. After he pulls over, Brody is taken to the station for a drugs test, which comes back negative. He tells Justin what happened and promises to stop taking cocaine. Justin later finds Brody contacting Lena to buy more drugs, and he tells the rest of the family the truth about Brody's drug taking. Brody's siblings cancel his credit cards, but he steals from Salt and meets with Zannis, who is only willing to sell him ice.

Heywood said Brody's perception of drug use had become "skewed" following his release from witness protection, and he finds that it is the outlet he has been looking for. The actor also reckoned that Brody was feeling "unbearable" guilt about how his addiction is affecting his siblings. However, Brody finds the drugs give him confidence in his ability to run his restaurant. The more Brody uses ice, the more he begins to rely on it. Brody agrees to sell drugs for Zannis to pay his debts, but the packet of drugs falls out of his coat pocket and is eaten by Buddy. Raffy throws the rest of the packet away, leaving Brody further in debt to Zannis. Needing money, Brody visits a pawn shop to sell Raffy's necklace, but upon receiving a low evaluation, he smashed up the shop. Heywood commented, "He's unhinged and in a rage – and he's making bad decision after bad decision." Brody then hijacks Scarlett Snow's (Tania Nolan) car. She gives him her handbag so he will leave, but Brody feels guilty about his actions and attempts to return it. Scarlett finds Brody in her house and knocks him out.

As the storyline progresses, Brody's addiction leads him to lose ownership of his restaurant and ruin his relationships with his sibling and friends. Heywood found that aspect of the storyline to be "the most realistic", pointing out that an addict usually does not see how much stress their family comes under. Brody also suffers at the hands of Zannis, who wants Brody to take delivery of a package of drugs at Salt. When Brody refuses and threatens to go to the police, Zannis retaliates by breaking into the Morgan's house and poisoning the water jug with potassium, leading Tori to be hospitalised after she drinks from it. Brody later hits rock bottom and "flies into an ice rage", which results in Mason and Justin having to restrain him. They have to lock him in his bedroom, but Brody escapes and steals from Scarlett. Brody is then found to be staying at a drugs den in Mangrove River and his brothers bring him home. He is arrested for his crimes and later learns that Raffy has temporarily moved out for her safety.

After Brody learns Zannis has been released on bail, he worries that the drug dealer will come after him. Brody's paranoia causes him to relapse and Mason finds him searching through the bin for drugs. Mason convinces Brody to let him drive him to rehab, so he can get some help. Brody soon becomes convinced that Zannis is following them and he grabs the wheel from Mason, causing their car to leave the road and crash. While Brody suffer minor injuries, Mason is left paralysed after suffering spinal damage. The crash is "a wake up call" for Brody, who vows to get help for his addiction. He sells his restaurant to fund his place at a private rehab out of town.

=== Marriage to Ziggy Astoni ===
A trailer released in June 2017 for the show's new Astoni family appeared to show a new love interest for Brody in the form of Ziggy Astoni (Sophie Dillman). Brody meets Ziggy while he is attending a Narcotics Anonymous meeting. When he goes to the bathroom, Ziggy suddenly enters and asks Brody to hide her. Brody agrees and hides Ziggy in his car, as her father Ben Astoni (Rohan Nichol) comes looking for her. Of the moment, Dillman said, "Brody questions what he's doing, but Ziggy doesn't give him a choice." Brody and Ziggy meet again the following day at the Surf Club, where she declines his offer of a tour of the area. Brody and Ziggy spend time together and agree not to talk about their pasts. They eventually share a kiss, however, Ben puts a stop to a potential relationship when he discovers Brody is a drug addict.

Brody's drug dealer, Zannis, notices Brody and Ziggy are close, so he kidnaps her and holds her hostage at a motel. Zannis tries to get Ziggy to text Brody asking him to meet her, but she refuses. Dillman commented that Ziggy "tries everything she can to protect Brody." When Zannis threatens her with a gun, Ziggy finally sends the text to Brody. When Brody turns up at the motel, he is expecting "a sexy rendezvous" with his girlfriend, but finds himself tied to a chair and confronted by Zannis instead. Brody feels guilty for bringing Ziggy into his problems, and they are both scared when Zannis explains how he will kill them with an overdose. Kat tracks Brody down to the motel, but she is attacked by one of Zannis' henchmen and knocked unconscious. Zannis attempts to move Brody and Ziggy to a new location, but they are rescued by Robbo (Jake Ryan), who was in the back of Kat's police car.

As Ben disapproves of their relationship, Brody and Ziggy agree to date in secret. But when Justin catches them sneaking out of Brody's bedroom, things between them become "super-awkward". Justin is Ziggy's boss and he threatens to tell Ben, as they are good friends. Both Brody and Ziggy beg Justin not to tell Ben, but Brody later suggests that they should just tell her parents they are dating. Ziggy reacts badly to the suggestion, and Dillman said "She knows it will go badly, and she really doesn't want her relationship with Brody to end." Ben discovers that Ziggy has been dating Brody in secret, leading to an argument when Ziggy asks him to give Brody a chance. Ben ends up throwing Ziggy out. Realising that the relationship is causing problems between Ziggy and her family, Brody suggests that they break up. Of Brody's decision, Heywood stated, "He loves her. Which makes it so much harder, because if he wants to do the best by her, he kind of has to keep his distance."

Brody and Ziggy begin spending time together again, and Ben gives them his blessing to be friends again. Daniel Kilkelly of Digital Spy noted there was "clearly a spark between Brody and Ziggy", which does not go unnoticed by Ben or his wife Maggie Astoni (Kestie Morassi), who tells Ziggy that she should be with Brody if she loves him. A brief love triangle develops when Ziggy's former boyfriend Jarrod McGregor (Joel Davies) comes to the Bay to win her back. Dillman told an Inside Soap writer that Ziggy hates Jarrod for cheating on her, and she does not want to ruin what she has with Brody. However, Jarrod refuses to accept that Ziggy no longer loves him and he convinces her to spend time with him. After taking Ziggy out on his bike, Jarrod kisses her, but it makes Ziggy realise that she wants to be with Brody.

In December 2017, a Home and Away fan photographed Dillman and Heywood filming wedding scenes at Palm Beach, the show's outdoor filming location. Scenes featuring the couple getting engaged were broadcast in May 2018. Ziggy proposes to Brody, after reading a letter from her mother, who wants to see her daughter marry amidst her battle with lymphoma. Ziggy arranges for her family and friends to gather outside Salt, before she unfurls a large banner asking Brody to marry her. Brody is "stunned" by the proposal and readily accepts. However, writers threw an obstacle in the couple's way, by having Brody overhear Maggie questioning Ziggy's motives for the engagement. Ziggy assures her mother that she loves Brody, but he later calls off the engagement. After Ben convinces Brody that he and Ziggy "are made for one another", Brody makes his own banner to accept Ziggy's proposal again.

Brody and Ziggy's wedding storyline aired on 28 June 2018. The scenes were filmed at the Ku-ring-gai Chase National Park and Dillman described them as being "just beautiful". Heywood was also excited to film the wedding, saying "It's so cool to be part of Home And Away history as another couple who get married." Jackie Brygel of New Idea speculated that there could be problems for the couple shortly after the wedding, with Dillman commenting "You can never have smooth sailing in Summer Bay. You'll have to stay tuned!" The couple move into Ziggy's parents' house, which leads to tension and problems within their marriage. Heywood said the wedding stressed Brody and moving into Ben and Maggie's home "feels like a backwards step".

=== Affair and departure ===
In November 2018, Simone Bedford (Emily Eskell) was introduced as a potential love interest for Brody. Simone wins a cooking lesson with Brody at an auction. When Ziggy comes to apologise to Brody for an argument they had, she notices that Simone is flirting with Brody. Eskell commented that Simone has "a career crush" on Brody. As Simone and Brody begin working together, they end up sharing a kiss. Heywood explained that there had been a slow build up of "underlying tension" between Brody and Simone, before the kiss. Brody realises that he has betrayed Ziggy and feels a lot of guilt. He reiterates to Simone that he married and that it was a mistake, but he is also in denial as their attraction towards one another grows. Heywood thought his character was "fooling himself" by pretending nothing is happening.

Heywood admitted to Sarah Ellis of Inside Soap that he was not happy with Brody's infidelity storyline, saying "It was a very difficult plot for me to deliver – it really challenged me." Brody asks Simone to leave the restaurant, as he cannot work alongside her anymore. Heywood told Ellis that Brody is confused, as he loves his wife, but he is falling for Simone, who he has more in common with. Brody later lies to Ziggy that he does not have the time to train Simone. When Justin notices Brody is hiding something, Brody admits that he kissed Simone. Heywood hoped Brody would be honest with the ones he loves and brave enough to make the tough decisions about his future.

Simone returns to the restaurant to see Brody and they end up having sex. Simone is "horrified" when she learns Brody has not broken up with Ziggy, while Brody is feels immense guilt when Ziggy wants to celebrate their one-year anniversary. Brody and Simone continue their affair, while Ziggy starts making plans for the future, and later announces that she has sold their honeymoon vouchers for a house deposit. Simone overhears this news and ends her relationship with Brody. Eskell commented, "She feels like a home-wrecker. It's an awful, awful feeling." Justin, who knows about the affair, witnesses the exchange and confronts Brody about pursuing Simone while married. Brody ignores his brother and pleads with Simone to give him another chance, but she criticises him for not being able to choose between her and Ziggy. Brody then tells Justin that he loves Simone and wants to leave Ziggy to be with her.

Brody attempts to make his marriage work, but soon tells Simone that he loves her. Justin encourages Brody to come to a decision and stop "messing Ziggy around". Meanwhile, Ziggy makes plans for the couple to have a baby, which Brody appears to go along with, until he meets up with Simone and reconciles with her. Brody and Simone's affair is exposed when Ziggy catches them in bed together in Simone's caravan. Dillman told Sarah Ellis of Inside Soap that her character is "absolutely heartbroken, and in disbelief. Their marriage is completely torn to shreds." Ziggy goes home and packs her belongings, while Brody begs her give him a chance to explain. Ziggy initially thinks they can fix their marriage, but she then overhears Brody saying he loves Simone. Dillman said that Ziggy realises that he has fallen out of love with her. Dillman felt the best thing about the storyline was how honest the writing is.

After Simone is branded a "homewrecker" in some graffiti at the school, she decides to resign and move away from the Bay, as she cannot cope with being known as a "scarlet woman". After telling Brody that they can have a long-distance relationship, he suggests that they leave the Bay together. Heywood explained that the situation has been harder on Simone, as she has no connections to the Bay, but neither of them appear to have anyone on their side. He commented, "I think they do both need to start a new life somewhere else." The development led to speculation that the characters would be making their exits from the show. In May 2019, Daniel Kilkelly of Digital Spy reported that Heywood had not been seen filming on set. Brody departed the show during the episode broadcast on 10 June 2019. Heywood found his exit was "a bit bitter-sweet", however, he admitted that he had got "everything I wanted from the show".

== Storylines ==
Brody moves to Summer Bay along with his siblings Justin, Mason and Tori. Brody insults Leah Patterson's (Ada Nicodemou) food at the Pier Diner and she throws him and Mason out. Brody befriends Phoebe Nicholson (Isabella Giovinazzo) and he helps her out after the chef leaves Angelo's restaurant. Brody buys the business and renames it Salt. After Brody is followed and Mason admits to telling his former girlfriend that his family is in witness protection, the siblings are relocated to a safe house by their protection officer, Decker. They are later held hostage by their parents' killer Blaine Varden. Brody suffers a head injury when he is pushed down an embankment by Blaine's associate Spike Lowe (Jason Montgomery). Brody is badly injured when he is ejected from a plane that is carrying Tori, Mason and their friends to a vineyard. The plane suffers a carbon carbon monoxide leak and crashes when the passengers and the pilot pass out. Dehydration causes Brody to hallucinate and he falls off a cliff. He is eventually rescued and undergoes surgery at the hospital. Brody recalls overhearing an argument between his mother and Decker, and Decker reveals that they had an affair, which resulted in the birth of their daughter, Raffy Morrison.

Brody briefly dates Jeannie Woods, whose parents are doomsday preppers. When Jeannie feels that Brody has been rude to her father, they end their relationship. Brody takes cocaine after he is offered it by his new waitress Lena Ascot, and they have sex in the store room. Lena continues to supply Brody with cocaine. While he is high, Brody insults a restaurant critic. Justin discovers Brody's drug use and gets Brody to fire Lena. Brody buys more cocaine from Lena, who later sends William Zannis to supply him. When Brody cannot afford to pay for cocaine, Zannis sells him ice instead. Brody develops a dependence on ice, which results in debts and strained relationships with his siblings and friends. Zannis also has Brody beaten up, after he loses a large quantity of ice, which Zannis expected him to sell. Brody later smashes up a pawn shop, before jumping into Scarlett Snow's car and forcing her to drive away. She gives him her handbag to get rid of him. When Brody attempts to return the bag, Scarlett knocks him out and ties him up. Brody then tells her about his drug addiction. She befriends the Morgans and allows Brody to stay with her, but he steals from her and goes to a drugs den. After he is brought home, Brody is arrested and charged with theft.

Brody attends a Narcotics Anonymous meeting in the city and helps Ziggy Astoni to hide from her father, Ben. Brody kisses Ziggy and tells her about his addiction. Ziggy's parents disapprove of their relationship. Zannis threatens Brody's family, so Brody arranges for the police to catch them handling drugs and they arrest Zannis. Mason catches Brody looking for drugs and offers to drive him to rehab. Brody panics when he sees Zannis behind them and grabs the steering wheel, causing the car to crash and leaving Mason paralysed. Brody loses the restaurant when it is sold to pay for his stay in a private rehab facility. Brody tells Justin that he witnessed their parents’ deaths and has been trying to distract himself with drugs. Zannis kidnaps Ziggy and Brody, and intends to kill them with an overdose. However, they are located and rescued by Constable Kat Chapman and Robbo. Ziggy asks Brody to leave her alone, but later thanks him for sending Tori to help her with her panic attacks. They date in secret, as Brody is still in recovery. The Astonis discover the relationship, and Brody ends it, as he does not want to be responsible for breaking up a family. Scarlett represents Brody in court and he receives a suspended sentence.

Brody works at the Pier Diner, but is frustrated when he is not allowed to change the menu. He soon buys back Salt. Brody saves Ziggy from being assaulted, but Ben misinterprets the situation and punches Brody. Ben later gives his blessing for them to date. The relationship is tested by Ziggy's former boyfriend, Jarrod McGregor's unsuccessful attempt to win her back, and her mother's cancer diagnosis. Ziggy proposes to Brody and he accepts, but he soon questions whether Ziggy has just asked him to fulfil Maggie's wish of seeing her daughter marry. Ziggy tries to assure him that she wants to marry him because she loves him. Brody then proposes to Ziggy and she accepts. They decide to get married at the lighthouse within two weeks, so Maggie will be well enough to attend. Brody and Ziggy take their honeymoon on a boat, but they are forced to cut it short when Maggie falls ill, so Ziggy can help Ben and Coco look after her. Brody continues to support Ziggy and her family during Maggie's illness.

Brody bonds with Simone Bedford after she wins a cooking lesson with him at a charity auction. This leads Brody to hire Simone for a one-month trial at Salt. Brody helps calm Simone down when she accidentally locks them both in the store cupboard. Simone later admits she has feelings for Brody and they eventually begins an affair. Justin discovers the affair and asks Simone to back off, but Brody tells him that he loves her. Mason and Tori also find out about the affair. Ziggy later catches Brody in bed with Simone, ending their marriage. Ziggy moves out and her family feud with Brody and the Morgans. Brody and Simone go public with their relationship, which angers the Astonis, Raffy and Mason. Ziggy later confronts them after seeing them together and punches Brody. Brody notices Ziggy spending time with Dean Thompson (Patrick O'Connor) and tells him to stay out his and Ziggy's marriage, but Ziggy tells Brody to back off.

Brody asks Simone to move in with him, but they are rejected for a lease due to Brody's drug addiction. Simone moves into the cottage that Brody shared with Ziggy, which angers his siblings. Brody and Simone plan to leave Summer Bay together and Brody puts Salt up for sale, while Simone finds a new job. At Raffy's 16th birthday party, Coco returns from Queensland and confronts Brody for cheating on her sister. When Coco continues to insult Simone, Brody tells her that she should be mad at him, not Simone, and Coco tells him and Simone that they do not deserve happiness. Simone decides to leave the Bay without Brody when he has doubts about selling Salt. Brody and Ziggy finalise their divorce, and Brody gives her their wedding photo album. Brody and Simone sell Salt and move to Yarra Valley together.

== Reception ==
Ali Cromarty and Stephen Downie of TV Week were impressed by the new brothers, commenting, "Move over Braxtons, there's a new family of hot brothers in Summer Bay." They also branded them "loyal, caring and hard-working". Downie later called them "the mysterious Morgan brothers" and noted that they landed in "a whole lot of trouble" the moment they arrived. Daniel Kilkelly of Digital Spy dubbed the Morgans "Summer Bay's unluckiest family". A South Wales Echo reporter observed that there was an obvious spark between Brody and Phoebe. A New Idea columnist named Brody a "Summer Bay hunk" and thought he was becoming "the new bad boy in town".

A reporter for the Birmingham Mail bemoaned Brody's actions after getting into debt with his drug dealer, quipping "the latest resident suffering from the results of their own ridiculous actions is Brody, who must resort to theft if he's to pay off Zannis. Unfortunately, he fails miserably and ends up getting a beating." When Brody has to sell Salt to fund his rehab, Tamara Cullen of TV Week commented, "Ah, Brody. He's certainly made a mess! Now, he has to face the consequences." A journalist for South Wales Echo wrote, "The pleasure-pain principle seems to be at play for Brody this week. The pleasure comes from his blossoming new relationship with Ziggy, while the pain comes in the form of a court summons." Inside Soap's Sarah was a fan of the character, writing "Not only is Brody a genuinely nice guy, but he can cook as well! Ziggy's a lucky lady..." Seth Adamson from TV Soap opined that Brody was a changed character. He added "only months ago he had been in so much trouble with his ice addiction. Brody proved to be a man capable of change. He has worked overtime to win the trust of all in the Astoni family."
