= Jackson Heywood =

Australian actor (born 1988)

- Born: 20 July 1988 (age 38); Canberra, Australia
- Occupation: Actor
- Years active: 2008–present
- Notable work: Home and Away (2016–2019)
- Spouse: Anneliese Zanchetta (m. 2025)

Jackson Heywood (born 20 July 1988) is an Australian actor. He played Brody Morgan on the Seven Network soap opera Home and Away from 2016 to 2019.

On 3 June 2019 it was confirmed Heywood had chosen to leave Home and Away after three years and made his last appearance on 10 June 2019.

In 2024, Heywood appears in Stan Australia hit series Critical Incident, as key cast member, Greg Hall.

== Early life ==
Heywood was born in Canberra, Australia. As the third of six children, he was raised in a coastal areas Newport and later Narrabeen in Sydney, where he relocated at an early age with his family and his mother, Christine. He attended St Ives High School and following graduation in 2006, before he pursued as career in acting and enrolled at the National Institute of Dramatic Art (NIDA).

== Career ==
Heywood attended the National Institute of Dramatic Art and went on to audition for roles in Australian television. In his debut, he was offered the four-month recurring role of Lachie Cladwell in the Seven Network soap opera Home and Away in 2008. His first appearance on the show was in May 2009, during the 22nd season, as the violent ex-boyfriend of character Claudia Hammond (Alexandra Park). In 2010, he appeared in the Australian feature film Vulnerable and two guest spots in the teen-oriented drama series Dance Academy, and the crime drama series East West 101, before relocating to Los Angeles to pursue an acting career in the United States. Following several auditions, Heywood landed a guest role in the MTV series Teen Wolf in 2014. His final work in the U.S. to date were the two short film projects The Answers and The Weight of Blood and Bones in 2015.

Upon his return to Australia, Heywood earned the role of Brody Morgan during the 29th season of Home and Away. Brody's family arrived in Summer Bay in mid-2016. He is the third of four children having an older brother, Justin (James Stewart), an older sister, Tori (Penny McNamee) and a younger brother, Mason (Orpheus Pledger). For the first few months after arriving in Summer Bay, Brody and his family concealed the fact that they had been living in witness protection for the past seven years and that his true name is Bartholomew Lee, following the shooting deaths of his parents who were part of a drugs syndicate. The family's secret was exposed in the lead-up to the 2016 season finale. Heywood said he expected the Morgans to be seen as the new Braxtons of the Bay, stating in an interview with TV Week, "I can definitely see that, but I think we have a very different dynamic." In May 2019, Daniel Kilkelly of Digital Spy reported that Heywood had not been seen filming on set. It was later confirmed that Brody would depart on 10 June 2019 as Heywood had chosen to leave the role after 3 years.

In November 2019, it was announced that Heywood had been cast in Stan original television web series Bloom. He appeared in season 2, which released on 9 April 2020.

In 2021, Heywood starred in the critically acclaimed FX series Mr Inbetween. In 2023, Heywood appeared in the SBS series While the Men Are Away.

In 2024, Heywood would appear in Stan Australia series Critical Incident.

== Personal life ==
Heywood was in a long-term relationship with American actress, Zelda Williams, daughter of Robin Williams. The pair began dating in November 2013 and they kept a low profile, eventually making their relationship public in May 2014 while they attended a Tiffany & Co. event at Chateau Marmont in Los Angeles. It is believed that they initially met on the set of Teen Wolf, while Heywood was residing in Los Angeles. In an interview with The Daily Telegraph in 2016, Heywood announced that the couple had split following their three-year relationship.

In July 2020 it was reported that he is in a relationship with Anneliese Zanchetta.

In November 2025 it was reported that he and Anneliese Zanchetta got married.

== Filmography ==
Year	Title	Role	Notes
2009	Home and Away	Lachie Cladwell	Recurring role; Season 22 (8 episodes)
2010	Vulnerable	Ben	Feature film
2010	Dance Academy	Revhead #1	Season 1, episode 4
2011	East West 101	Abe Wiley	Season 3, episode 2
2014	Teen Wolf	Merrick	Season 3, episode 21
2015	The Answers	Doppleganger	Short film
2015	The Weight of Blood and Bones	Buck Duane	Short film
2016–2019	Home and Away	Brody Morgan	Main role; Season 29–32 (298 episodes)
2020	Bloom	Young Ray	Television web series (Season 2)
2021	Mr Inbetween	Matty	Season 3 (2 episodes)
2022	Father	Connor	Short film
2023	While the Men Are Away	Dickie	Season 1, episode 3
2024	Critical Incident	Greg Hall	6 episodes
