= Raechelle Banno =

Australian actress (born 1993)

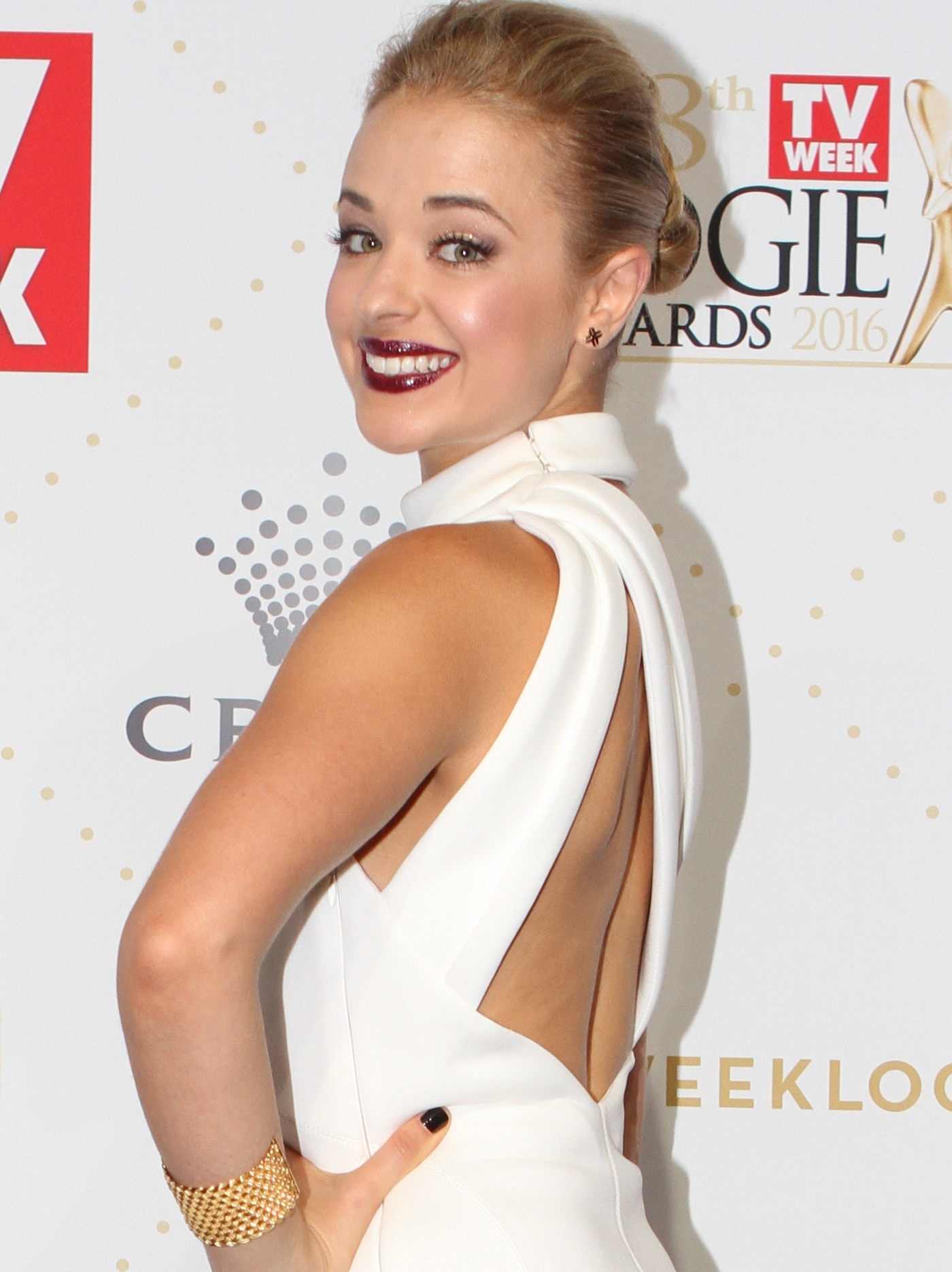
- Banno at the 2016 Logie Awards
- Born: Raechelle Jasmine Banno; 28 April 1993 (age 33); Sydney, New South Wales, Australia
- Education: Fairvale High School (2010); National Institute of Dramatic Art
- Occupations: Actress; dancer; writer; model
- Years active: 2002–present
- Known for: Home and Away

Raechelle Jasmine Banno (born 28 April 1993) is an Australian actress, dancer, writer, and model. Banno began acting and modelling when she was nine years old. After appearing in various television commercials and short films, Banno played Olivia Fraser Richards in the Australian soap opera Home and Away from 2015 until 2018. Banno played Atria Nine in the first season of sci-fi action series Pandora (2019). She portrayed Ruby Landry in four television films adapted from V. C. Andrews' Landry novels in 2021.

== Early life ==
Raechelle Banno was born in Sydney, New South Wales, Australia in 1993. She is one of three children born to Joanne Banno; her elder sister Stephanie Banno works in public relations and communications, and her identical twin sister Karina Banno is an actress. During her primary education, she attended Fairfield West Public School, and Fairvale High School from which she graduated in 2010.

== Career ==
Banno commenced her career as a dancer at the age of three, following the completion of FATD Jazz and Tap exams ad, and all her RAD ballet exams until her Intermediate grade, and in her later years she additionally participated in hip-hop classes while at dance school teaching ballet and contemporary dance to 9-12 year olds. She subsequently went on to become an actor and model from the age of nine, appearing for the Australian counterpart of British Boden's subsidiary Mini Boden, King Cow, Little Romeo, Barbie and Total Girl magazine.

When Raechelle and her sister, Karina, decided they wanted to pursue acting careers, they approached a family friend, who was a casting director for advice. Banno's acting career began in 2002 at the age of nine, having taken courses at the National Institute of Dramatic Art (NIDA). Initially appearing in commercials for companies such as McDonald's and Vodafone, she moved onto television roles, debuting in an episode of the 7Two children's drama series In Your Dreams. In 2016, Banno appeared in short films, including Second Best and Phenomena. She also wrote and produced the short film Exposure, which was directed by her sister, Karina.

In 2015, it was announced that Banno had joined the cast of Seven Network soap opera Home and Away, in which she would play the role of Olivia Fraser Richards, the daughter of Chloe Richards. The character has been played by various actresses since her birth in 1998, including Ivy Latimer who portrayed the role in 2005. Banno made her first appearance during the 28th season of the series on 28 October 2015 in episode 6313. One of her character's early storylines highlighted the issues of self-harm and child abuse, after it was discovered that Olivia had been cutting herself due to the trauma of being sexually abused by her uncle's friend as a child. In May 2018, it was confirmed Banno had decided to leave Home and Away.

After wrapping on Home and Away, Banno voiced three characters in the ABC ME animated series 100% Wolf: Legend of the Moonstone. She also joined the main cast of The CW's sci-fi action series Pandora as Atria Nine. In 2020, Banno and her sister Karina co-directed the short film @Bladeroller: Case Unsolved, which was selected for the Sydney Underground Film Festival's Take 48 lineup. The sisters and George Maher were also one of eight finalists selected for the 2020 AACTA and Monster Pictures pitch competition for their project Blackheath.

Banno played Ruby Landry in four television films adapted from V. C. Andrews' Landry novels for Lifetime. Ruby, Pearl in the Mist, All That Glitters and Hidden Jewel which was broadcast across two consecutive weekends from 20 March 2021. Banno's sister Karina also starred in the adaptations.

== Filmography ==
=== Television ===
Year	Title	Role	Notes
2012	In Your Dreams	Courtney	Episode: "Verliebter Jack"
2014	Karralak	Krissy	Pilot (series not yet screened)
2015–2018	Home and Away	Olivia Fraser Richards	Main cast
2019	Pandora	Atria Nine	Main cast
2020	100% Wolf: Legend of the Moonstone	Scarlet Jagger / Doris / Beatrice Beefcheek (Voice)	
2021	Ruby	Ruby Landry	
2021	Pearl in the Mist	Ruby Landry	
2021	All That Glitters	Ruby Landry	
2021	Hidden Jewel	Ruby Landry	

=== Film ===
Year	Title	Role	Notes
2013	Exposure	—	Writer and producer
2016	Second Best	Nouchka Bortsov	Short
2018	Phenomena	Emma	Short
2020	@BladeRoller: Case Unsolved	Kris Kent	Writer and co-director
2024	Better Man	Nicole Appleton	
