= Evelyn MacGuire =

Fictional character

- Home and Away character
- Portrayed by: Philippa Northeast
- Duration: 2013–2017
- First appearance: 3 September 2013
- Last appearance: 24 May 2017
- Introduced by: Lucy Addario
In-universe information
- Occupation: Student; Teacher's aide Fundraiser organiser
- Father: Ethan MacGuire
- Mother: Sarah Wilson
- Brothers: Oscar MacGuire
- Half-sisters: Denny Miller
- Uncles: Zac MacGuire
- Aunts: Hannah Wilson

Evelyn "Evie" MacGuire is a fictional character from the Australian soap opera Home and Away, played by Philippa Northeast. The actress was cast in the role after a successful audition and a callback, in which she was paired with various actors to find the right one to play Evelyn's brother. Northeast had to relocate from her hometown of Melbourne to Sydney for filming. She made her first screen appearance during the episode broadcast on 3 September 2013. Northeast left Home and Away in 2016, and her character made her departure on 24 May 2017.

Evelyn was introduced to the show along with her twin brother Oscar (Jake Speer) and their aunt Hannah Wilson (Cassie Howarth), creating a family for established character Zac MacGuire (Charlie Clausen). Evelyn is portrayed as being gentle, strong-willed, feisty, and down-to-earth. She and her brother entered the show as part of a cult storyline. The twins were forced to join the cult by their father, Ethan (Matt Minto) and they had differing opinions about living at the camp. The character's early storylines focused on her rescue from the cult and later return. A few months after settling into Summer Bay, producers developed Evie's first major relationship with Josh Barrett (Jackson Gallagher). The couple breaks up when Josh begins using drugs.

Evie was later paired with newcomer Tank Snelgrove (Reece Milne). Tank's influence on Evie caused her to rebel against her friends and family. The relationship also explored the topic of unprotected sex, a storyline that Northeast was glad to have the chance to take on. Evie and Josh are later reunited and become engaged. An issue-led storyline focusing on the BRCA1 gene saw the character go through a cancer scare. This was followed by the deaths of Hannah and Oscar, which led Northeast to worry that her character was also going to be killed off. After Josh went to prison for killing Charlotte King (Erika Heynatz), producers established a romantic relationship between Evie and Matt Page (Alec Snow), and they departed the serial together.

== Casting ==
On 25 August 2013, it was announced that Philippa Northeast had joined the cast of Home and Away, alongside Jake Speer. Northeast was cast as Evelyn MacGuire, one of three new characters introduced to the show as relations of Zac MacGuire (Charlie Clausen). On the way to her audition for the role, Northeast found a dollar coin on the steps to the casting agent, which she took to be a sign of luck. She was surprised to learn that she had won the role and had to ask her agent if she joking. Northeast relocated from her hometown of Melbourne to Sydney, where Home and Away is shot. She commented, "It was so exciting to have landed the opportunity. It opened so many new doors for me, not only in a career sense, but also because I relocated my life and moved to a new city." During a callback, Northeast was paired with various actors to find Evelyn's twin brother Oscar. She and Speer were the first pairing, and producers kept coming back to them as they realised that they had the right chemistry. Northeast made her first appearance as Evelyn on 3 September 2013.

== Development ==
=== Characterisation and family ===
Evelyn is a gentle young lady whose world has been shaken by the death of her mother, Sarah. Now her mother is gone, Evelyn feels responsible for her father and brother. Although her Aunt Hannah has been there to support them, she can see her father is not coping. As a consequence, Evelyn has spent her entire life finding refuge in the special bond she has with her brother.

— An excerpt from Evelyn's profile on the official Home and Away website.

Evelyn, or "Evie" was initially billed as being a "strong-willed character". Northeast described her as having a gentle side and "a sharp sense of humour". She often makes her feelings known, especially is she believes that her opinions are not being heard. The actress credited the writers for making Evie very real, and called her "complex", "down-to-earth" and "a little bit of a tomboy". Northeast later stated that Evie had "a strong personality", and that she was fun to play due to her stubborn and feisty sides. The actress also commented, "I really love the way she fights for what she believes in, which is something I associate with also – although at times Evie can be a bit irrational which is where I think we differ. We are similar in our kooky and inclusive sense of humour." In September 2015, Northeast reflected on Evie's personality, saying that she had an edge and was "very moral and black and white" but had never really done anything dangerous. She later told an Inside Soap columnist that she would be friends with Evie in real life, calling her loyal. But she thought that it would also be challenging due to Evie's irrational nature, adding, "She's a truth teller, which is hard to swallow, but she's a good mate in the end." Northeast said that she shared a similar wardrobe to Evie, saying they both liked the boho style. She also noted that Evie's style had come a long way since her days in the cult.

Evie is the niece of Zac MacGuire and Hannah Wilson, and the twin sister of Oscar (Jake Speer). Northeast stated that family is important to her character, explaining "Evelyn believes strongly in the value of family, having lost her mother at an early age and witnessing her father try to deal with the repercussions. This, in turn, has strengthened the sibling bond she shares with Oscar, in whom she finds comfort and entertainment." She is older than Oscar by two minutes and often reminds him when they argue. The official website stated that in their fictional backstory, Evie and Oscar created their own place to escape to when they were younger, before becoming "a formidable force" when they reached their teenage years. Northeast revealed that she did not get much time to work on forming a bond with Speer before filming began, but they later developed "a very sibling-like relationship". She also said that as Evie and Oscar are twins they had a different dynamic to a regular sibling relationship, including a sixth sense about one another.

Following their father's death, the twins met their half-sister Denny (Jessica Grace Smith) for the first time. Evie was instantly suspicious of Denny and was not interested in forming a relationship with her. She later upset Denny so much that Denny considered leaving the Bay. Oscar tried to bring them together, but it was not until Evie spoke with Leah Patterson-Baker (Ada Nicodemou) that she changed her mind.

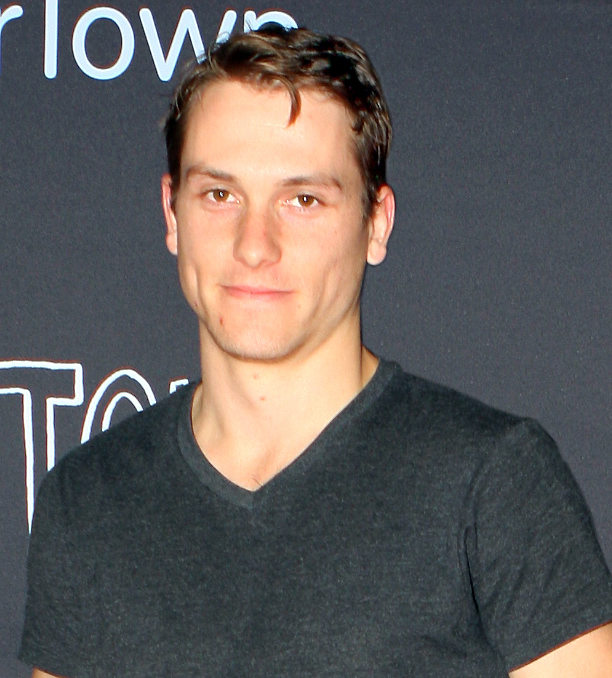
Jake Speer (pictured) played Evie's twin brother Oscar. Northeast said the siblings had a strong bond.

=== Introduction ===
Evie and Oscar were introduced to the show as part of a cult storyline. After Hannah informed Zac that the twins and their father Ethan (Matt Minto) had seemingly been brainwashed, he visited them at the retreat they had moved to. During the visit, Ethan tried to pass off the cult as a group enlightenment camp called Sanctuary Lodge. Evie was happy to be at the camp, and Northeast told Jessica Grubb of TV Week that she was prepared to do anything the cult asked her to do, as she wanted to keep her family together, while Oscar chose to rebel. Evie also believed that the camp offered her and Oscar a chance to establish a better relationship with their father. When Zac finally realised the truth about the cult, he asked the Braxton brothers to help rescue Oscar and Evelyn. Actor Nic Westaway, who plays Kyle Braxton, explained that Ethan was "holding them in a life they are not happy with", and as the Braxtons trusted Zac, they were ready to help out. Zac and the Braxtons fought their way out of the camp after managing to rescue the twins.

Evie was unhappy at being rescued and saw it more as a kidnapping. Zac and Ricky Sharpe (Bonnie Sveen) took Evie camping and tried to get through to her, but she chose to return to the cult to be with her father. Northeast commented, "Evelyn is unable to live with herself knowing she has left her father behind." A TV Week columnist noted that Evie's well-being was in danger as she was about to turn 16. Northeast explained that Evie had been told that her 16th birthday was a special occasion and would be marked in a "life-changing" event. Spencer Harrington (Andrew Morley) later joined Sanctuary Lodge in an attempt to gain control of his bipolar disorder and Evie befriended him. After the cult leader, Murray Granger (Christopher Stollery), announced that they would be taking part in a "discovery weekend", Evie and Spencer realised that they would be forced into getting married. When it came to their turn to marry, Spencer stood up to Murray and refused to go ahead. Murray had Spencer taken away, and Evie later found him badly beaten. She managed to convince Spencer to leave and return to Summer Bay with her.

A couple of months later, while Evie and Oscar were attending a music festival, Ethan turned up and had them kidnapped, along with Kyle. Ethan locked them all in a shipping container, and Speer said it was a "terrifying and confusing" time for them all, as they wondered how long it would take for them to be rescued. Due to the warm weather, conditions inside the container quickly turned into a sauna. Evie, Kyle, and Oscar suffered from dehydration and a lack of oxygen, which left them feeling groggy. Kyle tried to comfort the twins, and Speer believed they were lucky to have him there to keep them sane.

=== Relationships ===
==== Josh Barrett ====
In mid-2014, Evie was given her first love interest in Josh Barrett (Jackson Gallagher). When Spencer admitted to Evie that he had a crush on her, she was forced to tell him that she only liked him as a friend, as she had feelings for Josh. This shocked Spencer, as Josh was dating their friend Maddy Osborne (Kassandra Clementi) at the time. When Maddy discovered Evie's infatuation with Josh, she exposed it to all their friends, leading to a confrontation between Josh and Evie. When Josh had a fight with Maddy about her pushing him away, he met up with Evie on the beach, and they decided to spend the day together at the farmhouse. At the farm, they came across an escaped horse, and Josh suggested they ride it back to its owner. After the journey, Josh helped Evie to dismount and they ended up kissing. Gallagher commented that Josh realised in that moment that his feelings for Maddy were no longer there, and that he "sees something in Evie that excites him." Northeast enjoyed portraying Josh and Evie's first kiss on location with the horse, calling it an exciting and new experience. Josh and Evie agreed that the kiss was a mistake, but struggled to stop themselves from doing it again at the bus stop. Gallagher told an Inside Soap writer that there was a lot of support for a relationship between Evie and Josh from viewers who wanted to know what it would look like.

When Josh was attacked by drug dealers, he turned to Evie for help rather than Maddy, leaving her suspicious of the pair. A couple of weeks later, Maddy confronted them both, and Evie admitted that she and Josh had kissed. Maddy then ended her relationship with Josh. To get back at Evie, who began dating Josh, Maddy had a one-night stand with Oscar. Evie was infuriated when she discovered them together the following morning. When Maddy realised that Oscar thought it was the start of a proper relationship between them, she had to tell him that it just part of her plan to get back at Evie and Josh. In August 2014, Josh and Evie became involved in Andy Barrett's (Tai Hara) drug dealing storyline. The couple were kidnapped and taken to the farmhouse, where they were tied up together. Having been beaten by the dealers before, Josh really did not want Evie to get hurt. Before they could be harmed, Andy and Darryl Braxton (Steve Peacocke) arrived to pay off Andy's debt. Josh and Evie were left "shaken up" by the ordeal and Josh blamed Andy for putting Evie in danger. Evie was "livid" when Maddy learned that she and Josh had yet to consummate their relationship. She believed Maddy would think that they were not serious and attempt to win Josh back.

Shortly after, Evie and Josh's relationship was tested by his infidelity with Maddy. After his one-night stand with Maddy, Josh felt instant regret and tried to apologise to a "devastated" Evie, who refused to listen to him. Northeast described their relationship as "a little bit of a mess" following Josh's infidelity. Northeast explained to Stephen Downie of TV Week that Evie did not feel ready to have sex with Josh and was worried that she somehow pushed him into seeking comfort with Maddy. Evie was further incensed when Oscar tried to help Maddy out and accused her of stealing both her boyfriend and her brother. Northeast said, "Evie is appalled at Oscar. But even more so at Maddy for using her brother, and trying to ruin their relationship with Josh." After supporting Josh through Maddy's pregnancy scare, Evie realised that she wanted things between them to go back to how it was before his betrayal. She then met up with Josh to tell him that she wanted to get back together and he agreed. When Evie wanted to lose her virginity to Josh, he got "cold feet" as he did not want her first time to be in the back of a car, which left Evie feeling "utterly rejected". Josh later surprised Evie with a romantic gesture, and they finally consummated their relationship.

Evie broke up with Josh following his revelation that he had been using drugs. He tried to win her back and asked her out to dinner after they worked on his submission essay for a HSC course. She continued to resist his attempts to get her to change her mind and made it clear that she only wanted to be friends with him. Northeast stated that Evie and Josh had a strong connection, and would always be involved in each other's live whether they were a couple or not. The actress wanted the characters to get back together, as she enjoyed working with Gallagher. Josh and Evie later reunited and Northeast commented, "The fact she and Josh were able to work out their differences together has made them stronger." During a visit to the city, Josh made an "impromptu" marriage proposal, which Evie accepted. Northeast told an Inside Soap columnist that neither Josh or Evie see it coming, but Josh did not want to waste another minute, and he used a champagne wire as a ring. The actress said Evie was "over the moon", as being with Josh is all she ever wanted.

==== Tank Snelgrove ====
"She knew that Tank was a little bit dangerous, but the fact that all the people close to her were really worried made Evie rebel a little bit. She really wanted them to see the good side in him, the side that Evie sees."

— Northeast on Evie relationship with Tank

In September 2015, Evie was paired with the show's new "bad boy" Tank Snelgrove (Reece Milne). Evie was the first character to interact with Tank, after they bumped into one another on the beach. Milne commented that "Evie quite likes how mysterious he is". He later said that Tank latched on to the innocence he saw in her. Evie grew closer to Tank during a paddleboarding lesson, and she later told Maddy how good Tank made her feel. Josh reacted badly to the relationship and tried to warn Evie off Tank, as he knew him from his HSC course. Tank and Evie's relationship continued at an accelerated pace. When he took her to Jump Rock, he convinced her to leap off the cliff into the water below. However, as Evie went to jump, Tank pulled her back and the adrenaline led to them having sex for the first time. Of that moment, Northeast stated, "Evie has no regrets about having sex with Tank, but she's left aware that it was a very stupid idea not to use protection."

Evie later confided in Maddy, who persuaded her to take the emergency contraception to prevent pregnancy. Northeast said she was pleased that the subject of unprotected sex was being dealt with. Evie's friends believed Tank was being careless and not looking out for her, but she refused to listen to them and thought they were against her new relationship. Zac also voiced his concerns as Evie began sneaking out to be with Tank and changed her style to match him. Northeast commented that Tank brought Evie out of her shell and she was attracted to the danger he brought to her life. Northeast later told Kerry Harvey of Stuff.co.nz that Evie should have listened to her family and friends as "they had her best interests at heart". Tank eventually held Evie captive in a house in the bush, before he attacked and injured Josh. Northeast thought the bad relationship between Evie and Tank should act as a warning to female viewers.

Days later, Tank left a bomb threat for his father Greg (Paul Gleeson), leading to the evacuation of the school. As everyone was waiting outside, Evie received a text from Tank asking her to meet him or he would detonate the bomb. Northeast said, "At that point, Evie is very concerned. She now knows just how unpredictable and dangerous Tank really is." Evie managed to leave the school and met Tank at the Caravan Park, where she tried to persuade Tank to hand himself in to the police. Tank then revealed that the bomb threat was a hoax. He asked Evie to run away with him again, so they could start over. Northeast noted that Tank seemed unaware of the damage he had caused, particularly to Josh who was lying in a coma. Months later, just as Evie got engaged to Josh, she learned Tank was in the local hospital following a prison fight. She also learned Zac was helping Tank to get parole and saw it as a betrayal. Northeast added, "Seeing Tank brings up a lot of emotions in Evie. He caused so much tragedy for her and her loves ones, and it's still fresh in her mind."

=== Cancer scare ===
In February 2016, it was announced that Evie would be part of an issue-led storyline focusing on cancer and the BRCA1 gene. The storyline started with Evie discovering a lump in her breast. Northeast commented, "She immediately jumps to the conclusion it must be cancer." The actress explained that Evie's fears come from the fact that her mother died from cancer. The situation brought back "traumatic memories" for her. Evie's family came together to support her as she waited for a diagnosis. At the hospital, Nate Cooper (Kyle Pryor) told Evie that the lump was benign and she did not have cancer. Evie was "overwhelmed with relief", but she later broke down as she was further reminded of her mother's death. Hannah later urged the family to get tested for the BRCA gene to see if they had a higher chance of developing cancer. However, Oscar initially refused to take the test, as he did not want to know his fate.

=== Family deaths ===
While attending a hospital fundraiser at the Caravan Park, a fight between Andy and Tank caused a gas explosion that tore through the party. When Evie began suffering a panic attack, she was taken back to Summer Bay House by Zac and Leah. Speaking to Sarah Ellis of Inside Soap, Northeast said that Evie was "freaking out" about where Oscar, Hannah, and Josh were. Josh and Hannah eventually turned up at the house alive, but Josh was forced to tell Evie that Oscar had been killed. Northeast called the moment "the most horrific thing Evie has ever experienced" and explained that Evie struggles to process the news, as she and Oscar had a special connection. Hannah, who sustained a head injury in the explosion, chose to go to work to keep herself distracted. There, she collapsed, and the doctors were unable to revive her. Northeast told Ellis, "When Evie finds out Hannah has dropped dead as well, it's beyond her comprehension. She's so angry—it seems like a cruel joke that another family member could die in such a short period of time."

"Evie hasn't dealt with the pain of losing Oscar. Evie is a lost girl, clinging to anything that might bring Oscar back."

— Northeast on Evie's grief at Oscar's death.

In an interview with Kerry Harvey of Stuff.co.nz, Northeast revealed that the cast had agreed that Evie was now a "bigger curse" than Leah, who has been widowed twice. She admitted to being scared that her character was also going to die. She also admitted that she cried when Speer told her that he was leaving the cast. Weeks after Oscar and Hannah's deaths, Evie also learned that Josh had been responsible for killing Charlotte King (Erika Heynatz). He kept the truth from her while she was grieving. Northeast told Harvey that Evie is angry with Josh when he tells her what he has done, but she is "determined" to stop him from going to prison. The actress added that Evie would go on "a massive journey" over the following months.

A few months later, Evie was still struggling to cope with Oscar's death. She was also involved in a plane crash, where she became convinced that she survived because Oscar was protecting her. Evie then set out to prove to her friend Mason Morgan (Orpheus Pledger) that Oscar was watching over her by driving recklessly. She was convinced that she would not crash, but Mason was shaken up by the stunt and "lets rip at her". Evie then went to the beach, hoping that Oscar would appear to her. She then decided to wade out into the sea, and Northeast commented, "She has the idea that if she gets into the water, he'll come to her again. She's really hoping for the impossible." As Evie gets further out to sea, she struggles to stay afloat and required rescuing.

=== Departure ===
In 2016, Northeast's management company updated her online CV to show that she had finished filming on Home and Away. In the 18–24 March 2017 edition of TV Week, it was confirmed that Evie would depart that week, along with her love interest Matt Page, played by Alec Snow. The characters had a ceremonial wedding before leaving the Bay for Vietnam. On 24 May 2017, Evie was seen in a video call to Zac, inviting him to come and live with her and Matt in Vietnam.

== Reception ==
Ahead of Oscar and Evelyn's introduction, Jo Casamento from The Sydney Morning Herald stated "The River boys have calmed down, so Summer Bay is due for another shake-up, this time in the shape of teen twins Oscar and Evelyn." While Kerry Harvey of Stuff.co.nz dubbed her "rather strait-laced". An Inside Soap contributor thought she was an "impressionable teenager", and their colleague dubbed her "plucky". As Josh and Evie's shared their first kiss, a Daily Record reporter noted "The attraction between Josh and Evelyn has been obvious for a while". Mark James Lowe of All About Soap said the kiss was "ill-advised", but it "will come as a shock to nobody, as they've been fighting their attraction to each other for weeks."

Stephen Downie of TV Week branded Josh and Evie a "once adorable couple" during their first break-up. A reporter for the Sunday Mail observed "the penny drops for Evelyn that falling for a chap called Tank may be quite romantic but it's not going to lead to a rosy future." A contributor to the Liverpool Echo noted "At long last, Evelyn has something to smile about – she's given the all-clear from cancer." After Hannah and Oscar died, Sarah Ellis of Inside Soap quipped "If there was an award for the unluckiest person in soap, surely Summer Bay's Evie MacGuire would be odds-on favourite to win right now."
