= List of Home and Away characters introduced in 2015 =

Home and Away is an Australian television soap opera. It was first broadcast on the Seven Network on 17 January 1988. The following is a list of characters that appeared in 2015, by order of first appearance. All characters were introduced by the soap's executive producer, Lucy Addario. The 28th season of Home and Away began airing from 2 February 2015. Katarina Chapman and Ryan Kelly were introduced in the same month. Martin Ashford's sister, Billie Ashford arrived in April, while Charlotte King made her first appearance in June. James Edmunds and Charlotte's teenage son Hunter King made their debuts in July. September saw the arrival of Tank Snelgrove, while Trystan Powell was introduced in October. Skye Peters made her first appearance in November.

== Katarina Chapman ==
Katarina "Kat" Chapman, played by Pia Miller, made her first screen appearance on 5 February 2015. The character and Miller's casting was announced on 4 August 2014. Miller auditioned for the role two weeks before the announcement and she began filming from 5 August. Of joining Home and Away, Miller said "I'm feeling very excited, it just feels like it's been such a whirlwind." Kat moves to Summer Bay from the city and she was described as being "tough and resilient". Kat is a policewoman and Miller explained that her character was there "to enforce the law and help people", instead of being a "sex symbol". The actress added that Kat "has been through a bit and had experiences - some good and some not so great". For her portrayal of Kat, Miller earned a nomination for the Logie Award for Best New Talent in 2016.

== Ryan Kelly ==
Ryan Kelly
- Home and Away character
- Portrayed by: Daniel Webber
- First appearance: 17 February 2015
- Last appearance: 24 March 2015
- Introduced by: Lucy Addario

Ryan Kelly, played by Daniel Webber, made his first screen appearance on 17 February 2015. Webber is the real-life flatmate of Nic Westaway, who plays Kyle Braxton. After being cast as Ryan, he told Westaway that he would be stalking his on-screen girlfriend Phoebe Nicholson (Isabella Giovinazzo). Westaway recalled "He said, 'I'm stalking your girlfriend'. Then he added, 'on the show'." Stephen Downie branded Ryan "a mysterious peeping Tom" and added "we get the vibe he doesn't seem like the sort of guy who'll settle for an autograph."

After arriving in Summer Bay, Ryan goes to the diner and tells Roo Stewart (Georgie Parker) that he is in the Bay to meet a girl. He spots Phoebe Nicholson and tells Roo that he is a fan of hers. He follows Phoebe home and watches her from the bushes. Ryan talks to her the following day and is spotted by John Palmer (Shane Withington) looking through the window of her house. Ryan sees Phoebe's boyfriend Kyle Braxton leave town and later shows up at her house, telling Phoebe he knows she is alone. Phoebe tries to get Ryan to leave, but he tells her he wants to help as she is not safe. Phoebe's screams alert John and Ryan leaves. The following day, Ryan is questioned by Katarina Chapman (Pia Miller) and told to stay away from Phoebe, who also gets an AVO. Phoebe's boyfriend, Kyle, and Ash (George Mason) threaten Ryan. After learning the Braxton house is empty, Ryan breaks in and plants a camera in Phoebe's bedroom. He later returns and kidnaps Phoebe. He forces her to wear a white dress and he cleans the make-up off her face, telling her he preferred her previous image and music. Ryan asks Phoebe to sing "Amazing Grace" and during the performance, Phoebe kicks him in the groin and manages to open the door, where Kyle is waiting to save her. Katrina then arrests a horrified Ryan, who vainly pleads for Phoebe to not let Katrina and Kyle take him away from her as he is dragged away. Katrina later informs Phoebe that Ryan pleaded guilty to stalking and kidnapping, and is now being held in a psychiatric facility.

== Billie Ashford ==
Billie Ashford, played by Tessa de Josselin, made her first screen appearance on 27 April 2015. Details about her casting and character were released on 21 April 2015. Of joining the cast, De Josselin said "I was super chuffed. No doubt there was a huge grin on my face for the rest of the week. It's a cool thing when hard work pays off and you know you've been given an opportunity to do what you love." Billie is the younger sister of Martin Ashford (George Mason), who tried to track her down after he was released from prison. Mason commented, "Billie is the only family Ash has left, and he feels they need to make amends now he is out of jail." Describing Billie, de Josselin said "Billie's super upfront and sometimes lacks a social filter." Billie and Ash were reunited at their brother Luke's graveside on Anzac Day. The character was killed off on the 15 February 2017.

== Charlotte King ==
Charlotte King, played by Erika Heynatz, made her first screen appearance on 25 June 2015. The character and casting was announced on 11 January 2015. Heynatz began filming on-set during the week commencing 12 January. Of her casting, Heynatz commented "Just like with any new job or new environment, there are always some nerves. But ultimately, I am really thrilled. It feels like the perfect timing, the perfect role and the character is going to be a lot of fun to play." Charlotte is a biology teacher, who joined the staff at the local high school. She later explained that Charlotte comes to Summer Bay for a fresh start, something that Haynatz related to, but would be hiding "a secret history". Debbie Schipp for news.com.au commented that Charlotte would not have a low key arrival, while Heynatz added "there is no slinking into the show in the background – she definitely makes an entrance." The character was killed off by Josh Barrett in the season finale on 9 December 2015.

== James Edmunds ==
James Edmunds
- Home and Away character
- Portrayed by: Myles Pollard
- First appearance: 9 July 2015
- Last appearance: 20 October 2015
- Introduced by: Lucy Addario
In-universe information
- Occupation: Doctor; Associate professor
- Wife: Megan Edmunds

James Edmunds, played by Myles Pollard, made his first screen appearance on 9 July 2015. Pollard's casting was announced in March 2015. He previously appeared in Home and Away in 2007 as Dane Jordans. Of his workload this time around, Pollard said "The amount of scripts you have to learn daily is quite full on and also for me, playing a doctor and an academic, you have lots of exposition in the writing and a lot of that is jargon driven; lots of big words and only one or two takes to make it work."

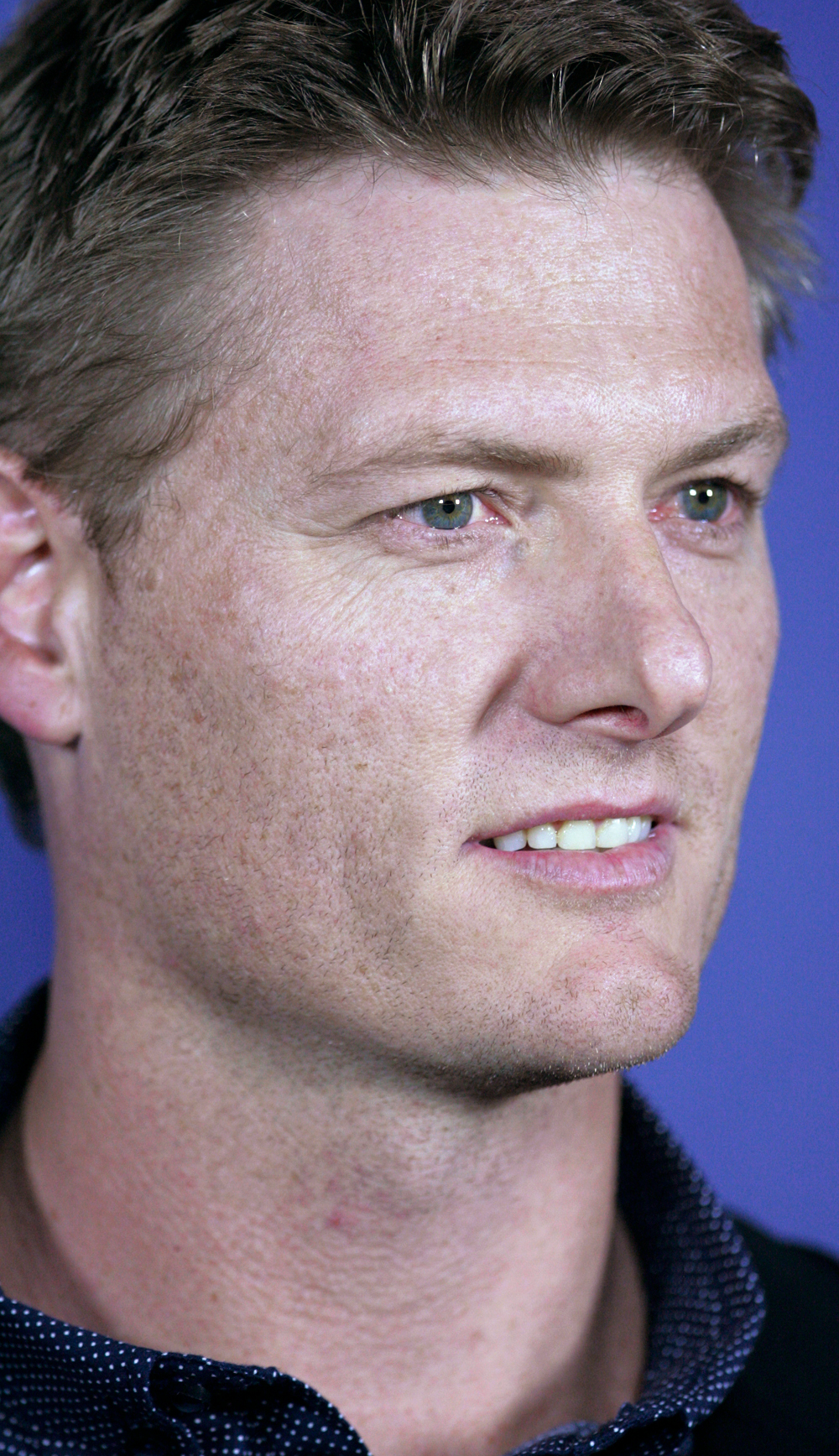
Myles Pollard played James Edmunds.

James is a doctor and an associate professor. He was introduced as a love interest for established character Roo Stewart (Georgie Parker). Pollard explained that James was more of a challenge to play than Dane and would play an integral part in Roo's storyline. He commented, "He's an intelligent character and really cares for Roo and her family, he really values that relationship. He's more of a protagonist too, so he's driving the story more than the other character I played. It's more responsibility, which is nice." Emma Bergmeier-Varian from The West Australian described James as "charming and affable" and reported that he has a dark past, an aspect of the character Pollard enjoyed playing. He said that James had good intentions, but was flawed and complicated.

James comes to The Diner looking for his former school friend Roo Stewart, after they ran into each other at a conference. He offers her a teaching job at the university, before revealing that he is moving back to Summer Bay, as he has found work at the hospital. On Roo's first day at the university, James wishes her luck and later invites her out for coffee. They get on well and discuss their teaching methods. Roo then invites James to Casey Braxton's naming ceremony. They later go out on a proper date, but Roo acts strangely, prompting James to leave early. When he learns that she was nervous and had received some bad dating advice from her friends, he kisses her and they begin dating. They attend a dinner with Roo's friends and her father, Alf (Ray Meagher), who takes a dislike to James. James starts work at the local hospital and treats both Katarina Chapman (Pia Miller) and Marilyn Chambers (Emily Symons). James asks Roo and Maddy Osborne (Kassandra Clementi) to move in with him. James tells Roo that his parents will be attending their house warming party, but he later tells her they cannot make it.

Maddy becomes suspicions of James when she learns he has two phones, while Denny Miller (Jessica Grace Smith) remembers seeing him at the university with a young girl she assumed was his daughter. James proposes to Roo and she accepts. They try to get married quickly, but Alf stops the wedding after learning that there is no record of James having worked at the Blue Mountains Hospital. James assures Roo that he simply went by his middle name instead. James suffers burn injuries when he tries to stop an aerosol can from being thrown into a fire. At the hospital, Roo comes face to face with his wife Megan (Sophie Gregg) and learns that they have two children. James apologises for lying and Roo ends their engagement, but continues the relationship. After James admits that his parents are actually dead, she breaks up with him and tells him to get help.

== Hunter King ==
Hunter King, played by Scott Lee, made his first screen appearance on 27 July 2015. Lee's casting was revealed when he appeared alongside the cast at the Logie Awards in May 2015. The role marks Lee's acting debut and he called it "very exciting". Lee described his character as being "angsty, brooding and moody". He added that Hunter would cause some trouble between some of the established couples within Summer Bay. Hunter is the son of Charlotte King (Erika Heynatz) and he follows her to the Bay, so he can finally meet his father Zac MacGuire (Charlie Clausen). In 2016, Lee confirmed that he would be leaving the show at the end of 2017 to pursue his acting career in the United States. Lee stated, "I'm excited. The times I've had has gone so quickly and I've learnt a lot as an actor."

== Tank Snelgrove ==
Tank Snelgrove
- Home and Away character
- Portrayed by: Reece Milne
- Duration: 2015–16
- First appearance: 9 September 2015
- Last appearance: 2 June 2016
- Introduced by: Lucy Addario
In-universe information
- Occupation: Student
- Father: Greg Snelgrove

Wayne "Tank" Snelgrove, played by Reece Milne, made his first screen appearance on 9 September 2015. Milne's casting and character details were confirmed on 5 September. He originally auditioned for the role of Hunter King, but Scott Lee was cast instead. One month later he was offered the role of Tank. Milne described his character as "every bad boy cliche rolled into one" and "cunning". He said Tank would have secrets, which intrigues Evelyn MacGuire (Philippa Northeast), who meets him on the beach. Tank departed the show in October 2015, but returned in April 2016. He was romantically linked into a relationship with Skye Peters, who is a friend of his ex-girlfriend, Evelyn. Tank departed on 2 June 2016 with Skye.

Tank accidentally bumps into Evelyn MacGuire on the beach. He apologises and tells her that he will see her around. They later run into each other at Angelo's and Tank asks Evie for her number. They later meet up for a date at the beach. Evie's ex-boyfriend, Josh Barrett (Jackson Gallagher) notices Tank and Evie together, and he tries to warn Evie off him. Tank and Evie spend more time together and consummate their relationship, but they forget to use protection. After spending the evening at his place, Evie questions Tank's commitment to her, after a comment from one of his friends. Tank flirts with Maddy Osborne (Kassandra Clementi), leading Evie to ask if they can slow their relationship down. Tank becomes angry and walks away. She later witnesses Tank arguing with Greg Snelgrove (Paul Gleeson) on the beach and Tank reveals that Greg is his father. He tells Evie that Greg is physically abusive towards him. Tank gets a tattoo with the letter "E" for Evelyn on his arm and they confess their love for each other. Evie's love for Tank gets stronger. Leah Patterson-Baker (Ada Nicodemou) confronts Greg about him abusing Tank but Greg says that he did not do it and Tank is manipulative. At Maddy's 18th birthday party Tank wants to meet up with Evie but she does not want to leave the party so Tank brings a lot of his mates to Maddy's party.

They then trash the place leading one of them throwing an aerosol can into the fire which explodes and James Edmunds gets hurt. Leah and Zac MacGuire (Charlie Clausen) forbid Evie to see Tank. One night he sneaks into Evie's room and stays the night but is seen by VJ Patterson (Matt Little) as he leaves off the roof the following morning. Evie gets into trouble and Tank convinces her to runaway with him. They do and Evie's family is worried about where they are. Tank becomes aggressive and scares Evie who wants to leave but is prevented. She uses Tank's phone to send a map of where she is to Josh. Tank catches her and Evie runs away into the bush. Tank chases after her and Josh goes to the location of the map. He guesses that Evie is in the bush and it is confirmed by Tank's shouts that he will find her. Josh goes into the bush and finds her and brings her back home. He leaves Evie at home and tells her he will visit her that evening but while leaving the caravan park Tank runs up behind him and punches him in the back of the head leaving him unconscious and in a coma for a long time. Tank plants a fake note saying there is a bomb in his father's office and the HSC exam is stopped and the school is evacuated. Tank texts Evie saying if she does not come to him he will explode the 'bomb'. Evie finds him and Tank opens up about his past and his mother's death. They are found by police and Tank is arrested over the bomb hoax and Josh's punch.

A few months later, Greg learns Zac was in prison with Tank and that his son saved Zac when he was stabbed by a group of prisoners. Greg visits Tank and realises he has been beaten up by the same group of prisoners. When Zac also visits, one of the prisoners stabs Tank. He is taken to the hospital and treated by Doctor Anna Griffin (Pip Edwards). Josh comes to see Tank, who tries to apologise for what he did, but Josh attacks him when Tank mentions Evie's name. Evie also visits Tank and he tells her he has changed. Zac helps Tank get parole. While out jogging, Tank collapses in pain and Skye Peters (Marlo Kelly) helps him. After they spend the afternoon together, Skye invites Tank to a party that night. As they arrive, Josh attempts to attack Tank again and he leaves, as Skye realises who he is. She comes to find him and asks him about kidnapping Evie and punching Josh. The following day, VJ sees Skye and Tank together and he tells Tank to get away from Skye. When Tank tells Skye that they cannot hang out anymore, she kisses him. He asks her to come back to his place, but she tells him that kissing is a far as she is going, which he respects. VJ catches them kissing and Tank leaves. At the beach, Tank tells Skye that he thought that he and Evie would be together forever and Skye realises that he still loves Evie. Josh confronts Tank and tells him to stay from them. Josh's older brother, Andy Barrett (Tai Hara) also threatens Tank. Skye apologises for telling Evie about his feelings for her, and they continue to spend time together. Tank decides to attend a hospital fundraiser at the Caravan Park, but Andy Barrett follows him and they fight. They knock over some gas canisters, which are then ignited by a loose wire and cause an explosion, which kills Oscar and his aunt, Hannah Wilson (Cassie Howarth). Andy later finds an injured Tank wandering on the road and he is taken to the hospital. Tank is questioned by the police about the explosion and tells Skye that he caused the explosion that killed Oscar. Skye is furious and ends her friendship with Tank. Everyone finds out that Tank caused the explosion and Zac attacks Tank.

Greg knows Tank was not responsible and knows that his son was trying to protect someone. Tank tells Andy that he is going to hand himself in to the police. Tank is arrested for the explosion and killing Oscar and Hannah. But Tank is bailed, when Andy turns to the police. Skye knew about Tank protecting Andy and confronts Tank. He tells her and finds out that Skye told Evie, which angers him. He later reconciles with Skye. Skye's foster father, John Palmer (Shane Withington) is not happy with Tank and Skye's relationship. When Skye tells Tank that she is ready to sleep with him, he tries to be careful and make sure if Skye is really ready. They sleep together at Skye's house. Tank finds out that his father was offered a job in the city and wants Tank to come with him to start a new life, since the Bay does not give him a second chance. Skye decides to join him, but Greg refuses. Tank then leaves Summer Bay with Skye to start a new life together. A week later, Skye returns home to get her other belongings before heading off with Tank.

== Trystan Powell ==
Trystan Powell
- Home and Away character
- Portrayed by: Ben Mingay
- First appearance: 5 October 2015
- Last appearance: 11 November 2015
- Introduced by: Lucy Addario

Trystan Powell, played by Ben Mingay, made his first screen appearance on 5 October 2015. The character and casting was announced in May 2015. Of his casting, Mingay said "It's awesome news, I'm thrilled to be working on a show that has great value, a strong storyline and is well shot."

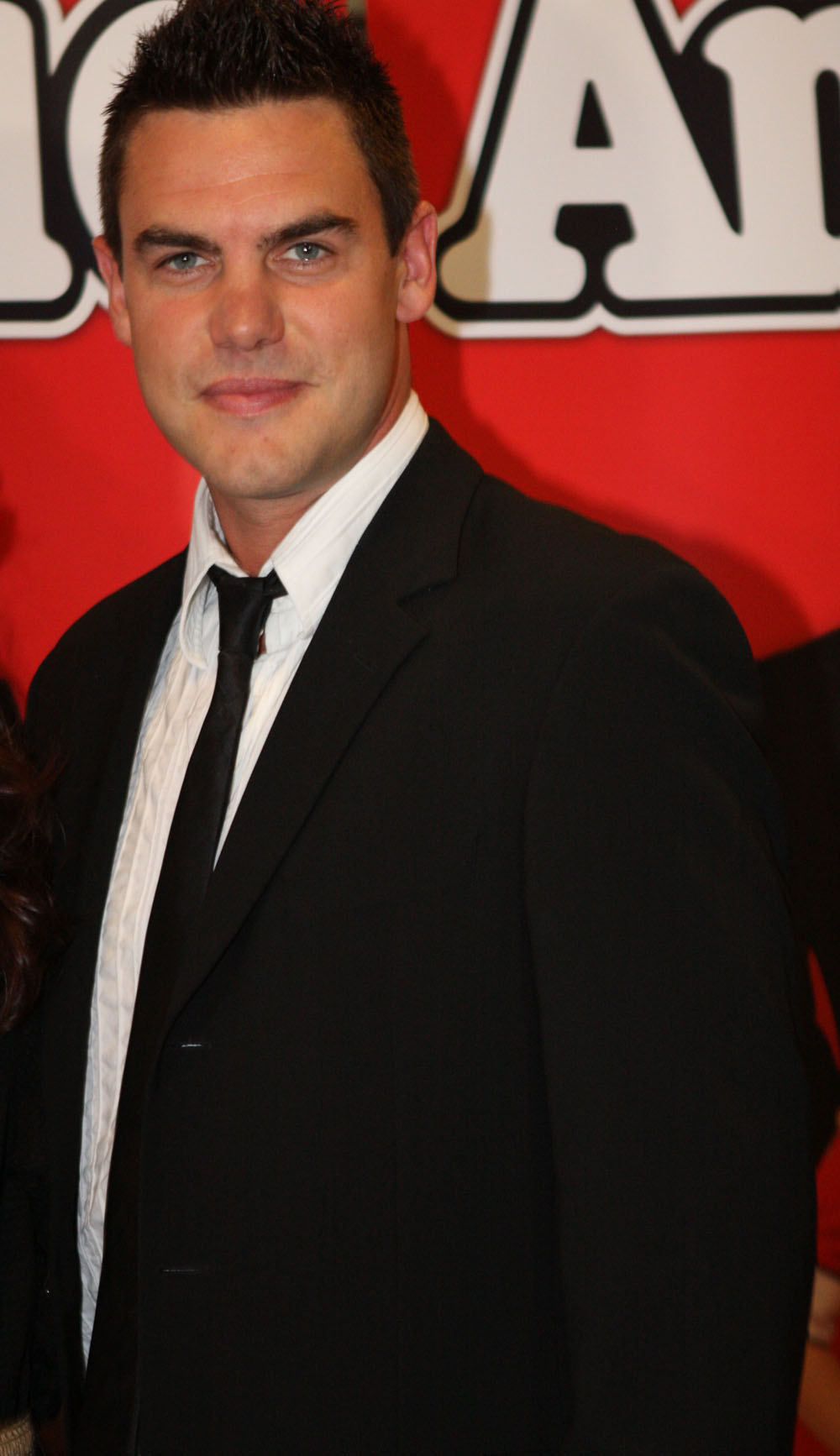
Ben Mingay played Trystan Powell.

Mingay described Trystan as "a dark and shady character", while The Daily Telegraph's Matt Bamford commented that he was "tempestuous" and would cause trouble in Summer Bay. Mingay later told Gavin Scott from TV Week that he relished the chance to play a villain, as he had mostly portrayed funny characters before. He commented, "The go-to for a lot of guys portraying villains is to be scary, but I tried to be a bit more calculating." He also branded his character "a shark in a suit", as he is well turned out. The actor revealed that Trystan would be interacting with Charlotte King (Erika Heynatz), saying that would cause "a massive headache" for her.

Trystan begins watching Charlotte King and sends her a note revealing that he knows she murdered Denny Miller (Jessica Grace Smith). When he learns that Charlotte is planning on leaving the Bay he sabotages her car to stop her. He blackmails Charlotte into giving him $100,000. It soon emerges that Trystan is working for Trevor Gunson (Diarmid Heidenreich) who believes Darryl Braxton (Steve Peacocke) has faked his death. Trystan forces Charlotte to get close to the people in Brax's life, starting with his half-brother Kyle Braxton (Nic Westaway). When Kyle sees Trystan arguing with Charlotte, she tells him that he has been blackmailing her, so Kyle attacks him. This only angers Trystan, who threatens to hurt someone close to Charlotte. He then has her son Hunter (Scott Lee) kidnapped and dumped in the bush. Charlotte meets with Trystan in her car at the side of a road and begs him to stop coming after her. After he makes it clear that he has no intention of backing down, Charlotte runs him down with her car. Trystan suffers serious internal injuries and dies the following day.

== Skye Peters ==
Skye Peters
- Home and Away character
- Portrayed by: Marlo Kelly
- Duration: 2015–2016
- First appearance: 19 November 2015
- Last appearance: 9 June 2016
- Introduced by: Lucy Addario
In-universe information
- Occupation: Student
- Mother: Carol Peters
- Sisters: Lisa Peters

Skye Peters, played by Marlo Kelly, made her first screen appearance on 19 November 2015. The role marked Kelly's acting breakthrough. Her character was introduced as Jett James's (Will McDonald) girlfriend. In April 2016, Sophie Dainty of Digital Spy reported Skye would have a "controversial" relationship with reformed "bad boy" Tank Snelgrove (Reece Milne), causing some of the locals to worry about her. The character made her final appearance on 9 June 2016.

In 2022, the show's former script executive Dan Bennett revealed Skye was supposed to be featured in the show for three years. He cancelled the character's stories and Kelly left the show. Bennett explained via Twitter that "Skye was meant to be a 3 year player; I canned her after her initial 13 weeks because (that poor girl) they cast someone geometrical different to what the story required."

Jett James invites Skye to Summer Bay to meet his father John Palmer (Shane Withington). Skye tells John that she has run away from her mother, as she blames Skye for the death of her sister Lisa in a car accident. John decides to speak with Skye's mother, causing her to run off. After talking with Leah Patterson-Baker (Ada Nicodemou), Skye agrees to go with John to see her mother. Shortly after arriving, Christian Thomas (Harry Turnbull O'Brien) walks past and tells Jett and John that Skye is a liar. Skye explains to John that she befriended Christian and started making things up to keep his attention, but she is not lying about her mother's behaviour towards her. Skye's mother Carol (Caroline Brazier) apologises for how she has been treating her. After John and Jett leave, Carol locks Skye in her bedroom. Skye escapes through a window and returns to John's house. She befriends Oscar MacGuire (Jake Speer), whom she tried to help him get over his ex-girlfriend, Maddy Osborne (Kassandra Clementi). When John was out, leaving Skye at home alone, Carol turns up and tries to take Skye home. Skye tries to escape, but Carol grabs her and held her hostage. Carol continues to blame Skye for Lisa's death and Oscar barged into the house and rescues Skye from her mother. Carol was taken away by the police and was placed in a psychiatric facility. Skye decided to move in with her aunt, who lives in Adelaide, but instead, John invites Skye to live with him and his wife Marilyn (Emily Symons), Skye accepts his offer and John fosters her. Skye visits Carol in a psychiatric facility, accompanied by Oscar. When Jett breaks up with Skye and she worries that John will ask her to leave, but he wants her to stay. After Marilyn breaks her leg while she is in Italy, John flies out to look after her. He asks Irene Roberts (Lynne McGranger) to take Skye in.

Olivia Fraser Richards (Raechelle Banno) takes an instant dislike to Skye, who badmouths about her behind her back. Olivia's boyfriend, Hunter King (Scott Lee) invites Skye to his basketball practice and there she befriends Billie Ashford, who watches the basketball game. Skye breaks up the fight between Hunter and his stepbrother, VJ Patterson (Matt Little), who blames Hunter for burning his old house. That night, Hunter forced Olivia to apologise to Skye. Olivia apologises to Skye, who forgives her and they become friends. Oscar invites Skye to Angelo's and she assumes it is a date, but she finds him kissing another girl on the balcony and leaves. Skye and VJ sneak into a university party at Angelo's and she becomes jealous when she sees Oscar with another girl. After VJ got drunk, Billie takes Skye and VJ out of the party. Skye and Oscar briefly fall out when she tells his date that he was with another girl earlier during the party. Skye comforts and supports Olivia, after her break-up with Hunter, who cheated on her with Lindsay Ford (Georgia Flood). VJ invites Skye and Olivia to the beach, where Lindsay and her friends held a party there. Skye accidentally confess her feelings towards Oscar to Olivia out loud, which Lindsay and her friends overheard and mocks her. Skye stood up for herself and tells Lindsay that she is not a horrible person. Skye and VJ stopped Olivia from slapping Lindsay at the Diner, who annoyed her, while Olivia was working.

When Oscar tries to ask her out, Skye tells him that she is no longer interested in him after finding out that his sister, Evelyn MacGuire (Philippa Northeast), knew about Skye's crush on him. Skye asks VJ to teach her to surf, and Billie steps in to help. Skye realises VJ has a crush on Billie and agrees to pretend to be his girlfriend to make Billie jealous. However, when VJ kisses her, she pushes him away and they agree to end the pretence. Skye supports Olivia when she learns she is pregnant. Skye helps Tank Snelgrove when he collapses at the beach. Skye invites Tank to a party at Angelo's, but soon learns he is Evie's ex-boyfriend, who kidnaps her and later coward-punches Evie's fiancé, Josh Barrett (Jackson Gallagher). Tank tells Skye that his time in prison has changed him and Skye believes him. She spends more time with him, despite warnings from VJ and Oscar. When Tank tells Skye they cannot spend any more time together, she kisses him. VJ later caught them kissing. Evie later tells Skye to be careful, as she does not want her to go through the same ordeal. Olivia also voices her concerns. Skye realises Tank still loves Evie and accidentally tells her, making things difficult for Tank. He forgives Skye and they continue to spend time together. Skye learns Tank is responsible for the explosion at the Caravan Park that killed Oscar and Hannah Wilson (Cassie Howarth) and ends her friendship with him.

Skye attends to Oscar and Hannah's funeral. At the wake, Skye tells Olivia and Hunter that Tank killed Oscar and Hannah. Hunter immediately tell his father, Zac MacGuire (Charlie Clausen), and Evie. Skye tells everyone what Tank told her. However, Skye knows he is protecting someone and confronts him to tell her the truth, or he will never see her again. Tank tells her that it was Josh's brother, Andy Barrett (Tai Hara), who caused the explosion and killed Oscar and Hannah, and Skye accidentally tells Evie, which angers Tank, but they reconcile. Skye tells Tank that she is ready to sleep with him; Skye later loses her virginity to Tank. Skye tells Olivia about her first time. Tank and Skye are caught together at the beach by Chris Harrington (Johnny Ruffo), who informs John, who is furious about Skye seeing Tank and tells her to stay away. Skye finds out from Tank that his father, Greg, had offered a job in the city, which leads Tank to leave the bay with him. Skye decides to join Tank, but Greg refuses. Skye and Tank decide to leave the Bay together. Skye says goodbye to Olivia and leaves a farewell letter to John. Skye then leaves Summer Bay with Tank to start a new life together. A week later, Skye returns to the Bay to pick up her other belongings and John finds her in the house. John asks her to stay, but she declines, saying that she wants to be with Tank. John accepts this to let her go. He gives her a photo of him and Skye so she can remember him. Skye takes her bags and leaves Summer Bay with Tank, but leaves the photo of her and John behind. A few days later, Roo Stewart (Georgie Parker) tells John that Skye and Tank have moved to the city with Greg. Greg promises John that he will keep an eye on Skye for him.

== Others ==
Date(s)	Character	Actor	Circumstances
2 February	Ed Devitt	Jason Kos	Ed is a security guard, who is called to Phoebe Nicholson's dressing room by Neive Devlin. Martin Ashford punches Ed, so he will not prevent him and Andy Barrett taking a drugged Phoebe out of the room.
11–16 March	Judge Menzies	David Roberts	Judge Menzies presides over Darryl Braxton's trial for Dean Sanderson's murder. After Brax confesses, Judge Menzies sentences him to 20 years in prison.
11–16 March	Paul Willows	Richard Sydenham	Paul is the police prosecutor for Darryl Braxton's trial.
12 March	Court Sheriff	Rebecca Clay	The Court Sheriff serves Nate Cooper with divorce papers from his wife Sophie Taylor.
26 March–9 June	Gregory Hayes	Robert Jago	Hayes is a prison officer. He accompanies Ricky Sharpe to the yard on her visit to Darryl Braxton. After Brax is attacked, Hayes asks him to give a name, but Brax refuses and is sent to solitary. Hayes later tells Brax that Ricky has not turned up for her scheduled visit. Hayes is forced to search Ricky's newborn son when she arrives for her next visit and tries to comfort Brax by telling him that he will not be inside forever. Hayes accompanies Brax on his transfer to the new prison. When the car ends up in the water, Brax pulls Hayes out and saves his life. Hayes takes Brax's handcuffs off so he can rescue the driver, but neither surface and are presumed dead.
1 April–18 November	Trevor "Gunno" Gunson	Diarmid Heidenreich	Gunno threatens Darryl Braxton when he sees Martin Ashford visiting him. After noticing Ash is still on Brax's visitors list, Gunno arranges for Brax to be beaten up. Gunno later tries to provoke Brax into a fight during visiting hours. Brax tells the guards about Gunno's drug deals. Gunno arranges for the vehicle transferring Brax to another prison to be run off the road. A few months later, Gunno sends Trystan Powell to blackmail Charlotte King into finding information about Brax, who he believes is still alive. Trystan dies after Charlotte runs him down with her car, so Gunno asks her to visit him in prison. He threatens to reveal that she murdered Denny Miller, but Charlotte counters that he has no proof. They come up with a plausible cover story for their meeting. Constable Katarina Chapman learns of the meeting and visits Gunno. He tells her that Charlotte is his ex-girlfriend. Gunno features in three spin-offs. In Home and Away: An Eye for an Eye, he escapes prison and kidnaps Casey Braxon. He is presumed dead after Heath Braxton lets him fall from a cliff edge. In Home and Away: Revenge, Gunno follows Heath and Bianca Scott to Northern Territory, where he kidnaps Bianca and holds her hostage. During Home and Away: All or Nothing, Gunno returns to prison and starts a riot, so he can kill Kyle Braxton and Heath, who is visiting along with Bianca. After shooting Kyle, Gunno fights with Ash, who pushes him onto a coat hook, which kills him. A guard witnesses the fight and tells Ash that he will take responsibility.
6 April	Dr Patricia	Briony Williams	Dr Patricia is Leah Patterson-Baker's doctor. She advises Leah about the effects of her head injury.
21 April	Dr. Delaney	Jessica Donoghue	Dr. Delaney takes care of Alf Stewart after he is brought into St Gabriel's Hospital following a collapse. She informs his daughter Roo Stewart that Alf has shortness of breath and chest pain, but it is not necessarily a heart attack. Dr. Delaney later informs Alf that he has an irregular heartbeat and needs to wait for a cardiologist.
21–22 April	Tom Knight	Vincent Ball	A WWII veteran who Alf Stewart meets in St Gabriel's Hospital. Tom introduces himself to Roo Stewart and overhears their conversation about Alf's trip to the Australian War Memorial with some students. Tom asks why Alf was brought in and Alf tells him that it was his dodgy heart, while Tom admits that it is everything with him. Jett Palmer comes to check on Alf and Tom asks him to help with his water glass. When Alf tells Jett that he reminds him of an old army doctor, Tom asks if he served and Alf tells him he did two tours of Vietnam, while Tom reveals that he was in the air force in 1941 and flew Lancaster Bombers. Jett asks if he bombed a lot of places and Tom explains that he spent his 21st birthday in occupied France. He mentions that too many boys did not make it home to their families, becoming upset. He asks Jett to close the curtain so he can sleep. Jett says goodbye to Tom before he leaves and Tom reminds him that family is important. Tom tells Alf that he is lucky to have a daughter that cares, and mentions that he has not seen his son in years. Tom later wakes Alf telling him that it should have been him and that he should have got them back safely. Alf listens as Tom recalls a time in the War when he and his crew were shot at by a night fighter causing him to crash land in a field. He lost all six members of his crew that night. When Alf wakes up, he learns that Tom has died and he tells a nurse that he will give Tom's belongings to his son.
21 April	Bob Harmsworth	Richard Carlwin	Bob works for Gunno. He drops off a bag of money to Martin Ashford and tells him the meeting is still set to go ahead.
22 April	Nurse	Emma Playfair	The nurse informs Alf Stewart that Tom Knight has died. She packs his belongings and mentions that she does not think Tom had any family, but Alf tells her Tom had a son and will give this things to him.
18 May–7 June 2016 9 March–20 April 2026	Casey Braxton	Various babies Austin Cutcliffe (2026)	Casey is the son of Ricky Sharpe and Darryl Braxton. Ricky gives birth to Casey with Kyle Braxton by her side, as Brax is incarcerated. Ricky and Brax decide to name the baby after his late uncle Casey Braxton. Following Brax's death and memorial, Ricky tells Phoebe Nicholson that she struggles to look at Casey as he reminds her of Brax. Casey falls ill with meningitis and is treated at the hospital. He is later kidnapped by Gunno. Brax is revealed to have faked his death and he briefly returns to the Bay to see Casey and Ricky. After Ricky marries Nate Cooper, Casey calls Nate "dad". Nate and Ricky's marriage breaks down, and she and Casey leave the Bay with Brax.
20 May	Bouncer	Ivan Se	The bouncer tries to stop Chris Harrington from entering a nightclub, but Phoebe Nicholson tells him to let Chris in.
20–27 May	Oliver Klozoff	Jack Ellis	Oliver asks Hannah Wilson if he can buy her a drink at a pub. She turns him down, but they later dance together. Martin Ashford and Denny Miller tell Oliver to back off so they can take Hannah home, but he refuses. Chris Harrington defuses the situation and takes Oliver away to meet some other women. Oliver later runs into Hannah on the beach and apologises for his behaviour at the pub. Andy Barrett tells Oliver to leave and then punches him. Oliver decides not to press charges against Andy.
25 May 2015 – 30 May 2016	Maria Carmichael	Blazey Best	Maria is a psychologist, who Alf Stewart visits in a bid to deal with his PTSD. After Maria starts to ask questions, Alf walks out on their meeting. Alf's daughter, Roo, invites Maria to their home and Maria asks Alf why he left. She also asks him to give her another chance and gets Alf to open up. Alf agrees to see Maria again.
3–30 June	Sean Gleeson	Luke Pegler	Leah Patterson-Baker meets with Sean to discuss her upcoming operation to reduce her brain aneurysm. Sean later spots his ex-fiancée Hannah Wilson at the hospital and they catch up. Sean tells Hannah that he never stopped thinking about her and later overhears her telling Leah that she still has feelings for him. Despite meeting Hannah's boyfriend Andy Barrett, Sean comes to Hannah's house and they have sex. Sean then reveals to Hannah that he is married. His wife, Emma, comes to the Bay and Sean tells Hannah that he will end his marriage for her if she wants. Emma learns the truth and argues with Sean on the beach. Sean later tells Hannah that he has ended his marriage and asks her to go away with him. She refuses and tells him to get out of her life.
24–30 June	Emma Gleeson	Samantha Clarke	Emma is Sean Gleeson's wife. She lunches with Sean at the Diner and he introduces her to Hannah Wilson and Andy Barrett. Emma and Sean attend Leah Patterson-Baker and Zac MacGuire's engagement party. Emma later confronts Hannah about her affair with Sean and reveals that Sean has cheated before. She tells Hannah that she will not keep quiet and that Andy has a right to know. Emma invites Andy to join her for a drink, after she reveals that she broke-up with Sean. She flirts with Andy and they almost have sex in the gym, but he tells her to leave.
1 July	Sandra Budd	Nhyree Sheldrick	Maddy Osborne sets Sandra up with Matt Page as part of a double date. Matt does not appear interested in Sandra and belittles her taste in music, while she dismisses his interest in video games. Matt cuts the date short, but pays for dinner.
14 July–11 August	Ambulance Officer	Nicholas Kai	The ambulance officer brings Billie Ashford to the hospital and explains that she has severe smoke inhalation and partial thickness burns. He later attends a shooting at the Braxton house and takes Katarina Chapman to the hospital.
14 July	Mike Powers	Sean Brandtman	Mike is a fireman, who investigates a fire at Leah Patterson-Baker's house in James Street. He explains to Katarina Chapman that the fire was bad, but he has yet to determine the cause.
16 July	Tania Jones	Demi Bryant	Tania notices Kyle Braxton in a bar and comes over to join him for a drink. Kyle gets increasingly drunk and Tania invites him back to her place. He agrees, but Denny Miller drags him away, leaving Tania alone at the bar.
21 July	Ben Allman	Dan Young	Ben meets Hannah Wilson at The Diner, after connecting via a dating app. Ben instantly puts Hannah at ease and they have a one-night stand.
23 July–11 August	Damo Adams	Josh Anderson	Damo meets Josh Barrett at a university open day and offers him some pills to help him study. Josh later meets Damo to buy the pills. A couple of weeks later, he meets with Damo again to buy more pills. Damo sells him a stronger dose. When one of Damo's clients overdoses, Josh reports him to the police. Damo tracks Josh down and holds him hostage. Katarina Chapman tries to negotiate with Damo and puts her gun down. They both go for the gun and Damo shoots Kat. He is then arrested.
27 July	Amber Schultz	Gabriella Maselli McGrail	Amber comes to Summer Bay High to inform Zac MacGuire that Greg Snelgrove has been hired as permanent principal.
27 July 2015 – 9 June 2016	Greg Snelgrove	Paul Gleeson	Greg is the new principal of Summer Bay High. He lets Leah Patterson-Baker go from her job as student counsellor on his first day. Greg asks Irene Roberts out on a date and she accepts. He also expels Josh Barrett for his drug use. Irene invites Greg to her house for dinner with John Palmer and Marilyn Chambers. John and Greg do not get along, and they later fight. When Greg learns the fight cost John and Marilyn a chance to become foster parents, he arranges for a DHS worker to visit them again. Greg argues with his son Wayne "Tank" Snelgrove. Leah confronts Greg about his behaviour and he denies hitting his son. He then advises Leah to keep Evelyn MacGuire away from Tank. Greg is angry with Tank, after he kidnaps Evie and then coward-punches Josh. Greg finds a bomb threat in the school from Tank, resulting in an evacuation. When Tank is eventually arrested, Greg blames himself for not being there for his son, after the death of his wife. Greg helps Zac MacGuire save his son, Hunter King, and Greg learns Zac was in prison with Tank, who saved Zac from an attack. Tank is stabbed in prison and Zac helps him get parole, forcing him to live with Greg. John informs Greg that Tank has been dating Skye Peters. When Tank is continually targeted, Greg takes a job in the city. When Tank asks if Skye can come with them, Greg refuses. Greg and John later discover Tank and Skye have run away. Greg moves to the city.
3 August	Dr Chan	Jason Chong	Dr Chan treats Kyle Braxton after he is attacked and left at a Melbourne hospital. Dr Chan tells Ricky Sharpe and Phoebe Nicholson that Kyle has bruising and swelling of the brain. When Kyle wakes, the doctor tells him he has been lucky and can go home soon.
3 August	Jay Bowden	Chris Noffke	Jay has a one-night stand with Hannah Wilson. Hannah encourages Jay to leave by agreeing to help Chris Harrington move some tables.
4 August	Monica Grymson	Madeline Withington	Monica and Wayne go on dates with Chris Harrington and Hannah Wilson respectively. Neither of the dates go well as they do not have much in common. Hannah ends her date with Wayne early, but Chris has more trouble and ends up insulting Monica, who pours a milkshake over him.
4 August	Wayne Eccles	Sam Tretman	Monica and Wayne go on dates with Chris Harrington and Hannah Wilson respectively. Neither of the dates go well as they do not have much in common. Hannah ends her date with Wayne early, but Chris has more trouble and ends up insulting Monica, who pours a milkshake over him.
13 August	Ivana Frost	Tegan Martin	Ivana is a potential investor in the Surf Club. She is also Chris Harrington's ex-girlfriend. Ivana does not initially believe Chris is dating Hannah Wilson, until they kiss.
20 August	Laura Marsh	Belinda Small	Laura performs Phoebe Nicholson's first ultrasound scan.
26 August–7 September	Mary Keen	Catherine Moore	Mary is a DOCS case worker who arrives for a meeting with Marilyn Chambers and John Palmer, only to find John fighting with Greg Snelgrove. By the time Marilyn turns up, Mary has to leave. She later organises another meeting with John and Marilyn, after being contacted by Greg. She tells them that she has been in contact with Nicole Franklin and has learnt that Marilyn kidnapped her son, which has jeopardised their chances of becoming foster parents.
3 September	Ed Sheeran	Himself	Ed Sheeran comes to the Bay to visit his former nanny Marilyn Chambers, who affectionately refers to him as "Teddy". She is initially unaware of his popularity. Matt Page asks Ed to play a song for the town and he obliges with a performance of "Thinking Out Loud" at Angelo's.
3 September	Dr Jacqui Hargrove	Julia Ohannessian	Dr Hargrove carries out an ultrasound on Phoebe Nicholson when she experiences some cramping during her pregnancy. Dr Hargrove tells Phoebe that she is fine, but she should avoid tension and stressful situations in future.
7 September	Dr Edward Povich	Michael Howlett	Dr Povich gives Phoebe Nicholson, Martin Ashford and Kyle Braxton the results of a paternity test.
8 September	Paula Davies	Jo Briant	Paula is a DOCS manager, who meets with John Palmer, after he and his wife Marilyn Chambers are turned down as foster parents. John explains to Paula that Marilyn is a good person and was born to be a mother.
14 September 2015 – 30 November 2016	Dr Samantha Benson	Alyson Standen	Dr Benson carries out an ultrasound on a pregnant Phoebe Nicholson after she experiences pain and bleeding. Dr Benson notices that Phoebe is carrying twins, but one of them has died. She later tells Phoebe that the other baby has a congenital heart defect. A few months later, Dr Benson informs Evelyn MacGuire that the lump in her breast is benign. She also tells Billie Ashford that she is pregnant. Dr Benson continues to treat Billie throughout her pregnancy. She later discovers that Billie's conception date has been altered on her medical records.
21 September–	Nurse Sarah	Samantha Ward	Sarah is a nurse at the Northern Districts Hospital.
28 September–8 October	Azza Mason	Tim Franklin	Azza is one of Tank Snelgrove's friends. He attends a party at Summer Bay House, which gets out of control. He vandalises the property with spray paint, before throwing it at the fire, causing an explosion which injures James Edmunds.
29 September	Jem Beijan	Mia Lethbridge	Jem is Azza Mason's girlfriend. She notices Evelyn MacGuire with Tank Snelgrove, and mentions that he has commitment issues.
30 September–6 October	Pete Ashfield	Andrew Cutcliffe	Pete is a school friend of Katarina Chapman. They meet for lunch at The Diner, along with Nate Cooper and Ricky Sharpe. Pete later returns for a photoshoot and ropes Kat and Nate into being models. When Kat has to leave, Pete asks Ricky to fill in.
8–19 October	Megan Edmunds	Sophie Gregg	Megan is called to the hospital when her husband James Edmunds is brought in with burn injuries. After learning James has been having an affair with Roo Stewart, Megan begs Roo not to break up her family. She gives Roo some family photos to make her reconsider her affair.
15 October	Brad Peterson	Stephen Hunter	Brad notices Charlotte King is selling her car and he takes a look. When he offers Charlotte a low price due to its condition, she reacts angrily and tells him the car is no longer for sale.
21 October 2015 – 30 November 2017	Dr Anna Griffin	Pip Edwards	Dr Griffin treats Josh Barrett after he hits his head following a coward punch. Dr Griffin informs Josh's brother Andy that Josh's condition is not good and to expect the worst. She later advises Andy to switch Josh's life support off as tests indicate that he is brain dead. Shortly after Andy agrees, he sees Josh move and Josh later regains consciousness. After running more tests, Dr Griffin tells Andy that Josh is in a vegetative state. Josh starts to recover and Dr Griffin tells Andy that he will be able to come soon, but tests have shown that his eyesight has not yet returned. Dr Griffin treats Tank Snelgrove when he is brought in with a stab wound. She later is fired by Tori Morgan, who chooses her over her partner Nate Cooper. However, when Dr Griffin complains, Nate decides to take redundancy instead. Dr Griffin treats Roo Stewart when she is brought in with a back injury following a car accident.
27 October	Freya Fairweather	Gemma Laurelle	Freya searches Summer Bay High following a bomb threat. She informs Mike Emerson that the building is clear, so it was probably a hoax.
12–24 November	Gavin Cooper	Daniel Roberts	Gavin is Nate Cooper's estranged father. After he is contacted by Nate's partner Ricky Sharpe, Gavin comes to Summer Bay to see his son. Nate is initially hostile towards his father, but they later enjoy a dinner together. The following day, Gavin joins Ricky and her son at the beach, and he makes flirtatious comments towards her. Gavin later gets drunk at Angelo's and tries to touch Ricky, who tells him to leave. Gavin then visits Nate and they bond over a card game. However, when Ricky tells Nate about Gavin's behaviour, he tells his father that he does not want to see him again. Gavin is later involved in a car accident and Nate manages to save his life. Katarina Chapman informs Nate that Gavin did not attempt to stop before crashing his car into a tree. After Gavin is discharged, he visits Nate to give him his grandmothers engagement ring and to thank him for saving his life. He also tells Nate that he is getting help for his drinking and they part on good terms.
17 November 2015–	Ambulance Officer	Rowan Freeman	The Ambulance Officer brings Nate Cooper's father Gavin to the hospital following a car crash. Weeks later, he brings Ricky Sharpe's infant son Casey Braxton to the hospital after Casey falls ill. He also brings Hannah Wilson in after she suffers a concussion and later a couple with gunshot wounds. Months later, the Ambulance Officer brings Hope Morrison to the hospital after she suffers an overdose, and he hands Nate some pills he found at the scene. Months later, he brings in Marilyn Chambers after she suffers burns in a bush fire.
19–30 November	Asia Chalker	Pearl Herbert	Asia is a student from Summer Bay High who asks Maddy Osborne to help her organise the Year 12 formal to raise money for Josh Barrett. Asia invites Matt Page to help out. Maddy's boyfriend, Oscar MacGuire, joins them and flirts with Asia to make Maddy jealous. Asia asks Matt to be her date at the formal and he accepts. At a schoolies party, Asia tries to kiss Matt, but he backs away and leaves. Oscar tells Asia that Matt is in love with Maddy, and Asia tells them they deserve each other, before leaving the party. Oscar finds Asia at the Caravan Park and when she compliments him, he kisses her. While organising the formal, Asia is rude to Maddy and Oscar tells her to stop. Asia and Matt agree to go to the formal as friends. Asia tells Oscar that she wants to be with him and Matt overhears them talking about the kiss. At Angelo's, Asia tells Maddy that she and Oscar kissed, causing their break up.
30 November	Christian Thomas	Harry Turnbull O'Brien	When Christian notices Skye Peters with Jett James and John Palmer, he warns them that she is a liar and an attention seeker.
30 November 2015 – 11 February 2016	Carol Peters	Caroline Brazier	Carol is Skye Peters's mother. She blames Skye for the death of her sister and is abusive towards her. After John Palmer and Jett James bring Skye home to Carol to talk, she apologises to her daughter. Once John and Jett leave, Carol locks Skye in her bedroom. When Skye escapes and goes to Summer Bay, John calls the police on Carol. She later tracks Skye down and confronts her. As Carol tries to force Skye to come home with her, Oscar MacGuire intervenes and Carol is taken to a psychiatric facility by the police. A week later, Skye and Oscar visit her at the facility.
