= Josh Barrett (Home and Away) =

- Home and Away character
- Portrayed by: Jackson Gallagher
- Duration: 2013–2016
- First appearance: 27 August 2013
- Last appearance: 5 July 2016
- Introduced by: Lucy Addario
- Spin-off appearances: Home and Away Extras (2013)
In-universe information
- Occupation: Student; Pizza delivery worker Waiter
- Father: Johnny Barrett
- Mother: Debbie Barrett
- Half-brothers: Andy Barrett; Casey Braxton

Josh Barrett is a fictional character from the Australian soap opera Home and Away, played by Jackson Gallagher. The actor was initially hesitant about auditioning for the role, as he believed he was too old to portray a 16-year-old. However, three days after attending the audition, he learnt he was successful. Gallagher relocated to Sydney for filming. His character was introduced along with his on-screen brother Andy Barrett (Tai Hara) through a series of online webisodes titled Home and Away Extras. He then made his debut appearance in Home and Away during the episode broadcast on 27 August 2013. Gallagher's departure from Home and Away was announced in May 2016, and Josh's last scenes aired on 5 July 2016.

Josh is portrayed as being troubled, but also someone who tries to do the right thing. Gallagher thought Josh was a lovable character deep down and someone who did not want his past to define his future. Several of Josh's storylines has centred around his relationships with Maddy Osborne (Kassandra Clementi) and Evelyn MacGuire (Philippa Northeast), the latter whom he became engaged to. He has also been involved in Andy's feud with the Braxton family, shot by his mother, held hostage and coward punched by Tank Snelgrove (Reece Milne), which almost ended his life and left him temporarily blind. In May 2016, Josh was revealed to be Charlotte King's (Erika Heynatz) killer, ending months of speculation. After confessing to Charlotte's murder, Josh fled Summer Bay with Andy before he was sent to prison.

== Casting ==
On 3 August 2013, Debbie Schipp of The Daily Telegraph reported that Jackson Gallagher and Tai Hara had joined the cast of Home and Away as brothers Josh and Andy Barrett respectively. Schipp also reported that the two characters would appear in stand-alone webisodes before making their debuts in the main show. When Gallagher heard about the role, he was "hesitant" about auditioning as he thought he was too old to portray a 16-year-old. The actor was in his early 20s and he did not think he had a chance of securing the part. After attending the audition on a Friday, he learnt he had been successful on the Monday. He commented, "Whatever idea they had in their heads of Josh, I happened to fit that image." The actor relocated to Sydney for filming, and admitted to being "terrified" on his first day. He spent a total of five months preparing for the part and filming with the show, before making his on-screen debut as Josh on 27 August 2013.

== Development ==
=== Characterisation ===
Josh is a troubled kid with a heart of gold. Life hasn't exactly dealt him the best cards, but he's strong enough to know the difference between what's right and wrong, and he won't let anyone tell him otherwise. Well, that is except for his big brother Andy.

— An excerpt from Josh's profile on the official Home and Away website.

Josh comes from Summer Bay's neighbouring suburb Mangrove River, where he was often blamed for things he had not done and received little support from his teachers at school, who thought he was "a waste of space" like his brother Andy. This caused Josh to ignore their rules and avoid going to school, causing him to be expelled. Gallagher said Josh was "funny", often tried to do the right thing and had his heart in the right place. He wanted someone to give him a chance. The actor thought the audience could relate to Josh's story, especially those that had been misunderstood or judged for where they came from. Speaking to a reporter for the Hepburn Advocate, Gallagher felt his character occasionally took over his real identity as he started to think like Josh and often lost himself in the character. He said that he enjoyed portraying the character, saying "what I really like about Josh's story is it demonstrates that your past doesn't necessarily define your future, and you don't have to be who people expect you to be."

Gallagher also felt that deep down Josh was "a loveable character". Gallagher told Lucy Thomas of SheRa magazine that he felt "funny" about portraying a 17-year-old and trying to reconnect with that period of his life. He also explained that Andy has looked out for Josh and taken care of him in the absence of their father. When Josh started to question whether he wanted to be like Andy, it caused some tension between them. Josh felt that he had to do what Andy said, leading to him getting into trouble. The actor also said that the brothers often found themselves getting into fights. Gallagher found it interesting portraying a younger brother, as he is the elder brother in his family in real life. Gallagher created "a really great bond" with Hara, and he put it down to them joining the cast at the same time. They developed a strong brotherly friendship by going on road trips and taking up rock climbing.

=== Webisodes ===
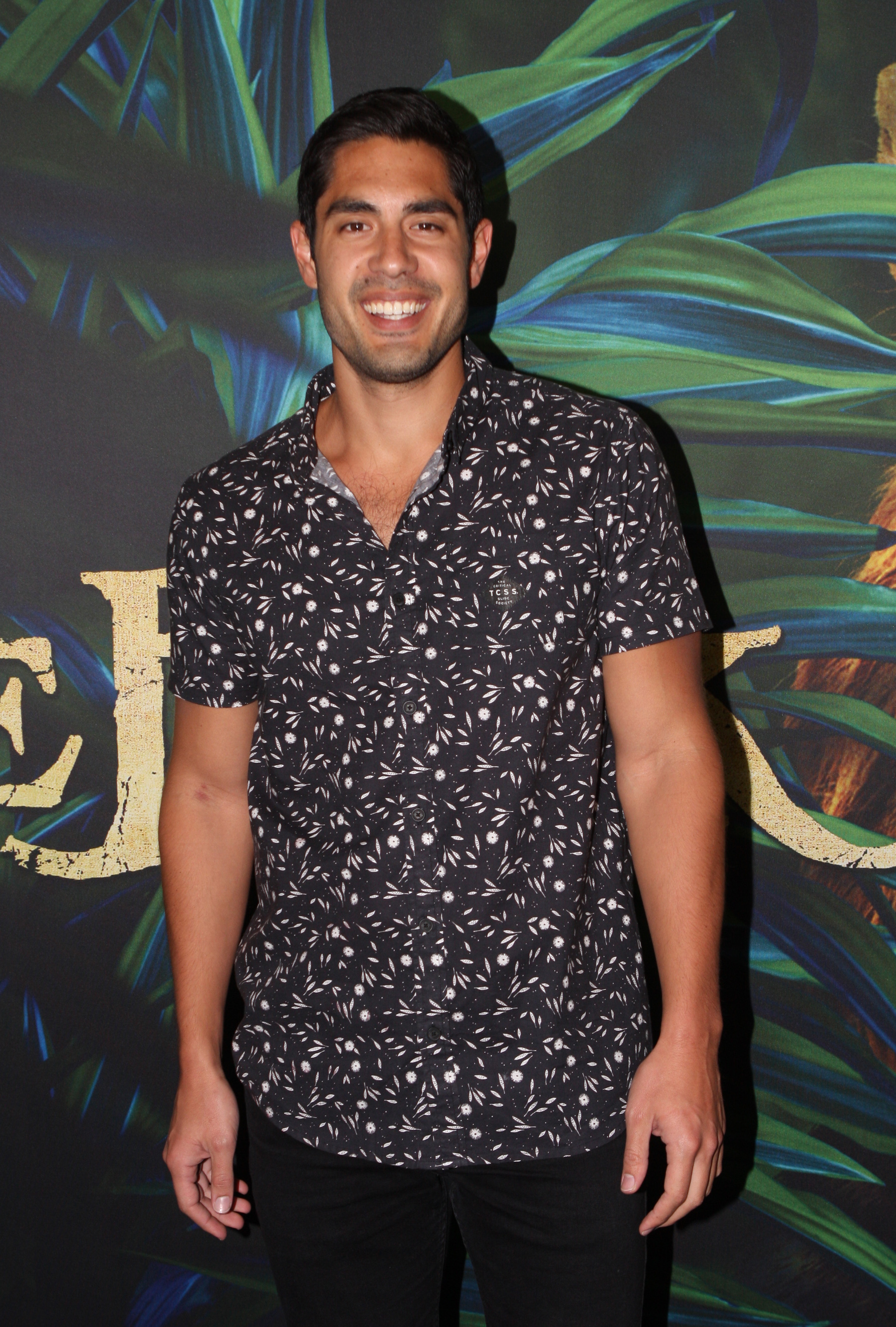
Tai Hara (pictured) played Josh's brother Andy. Hara and Gallagher formed a strong brotherly friendship as they were introduced at the same time.

Josh, his brother Andy and their backstory were introduced to viewers during four stand-alone webisodes titled Home and Away Extras, ahead of their first appearance in the main show. The webisodes were written by Louise Bowes and directed by Danny Raco. Home and Away's series producer Lucy Addario stated, "We wanted to provide fans with new ways to engage with one of Australia's longest running and most loved television brands. We're going to reveal dramatic details of the characters' back-stories before they are introduced as a major storyline." The first webisode was released on 7 August 2013, immediately following that day's broadcast of Home and Away. An article on the show's official website explained that Barrett brothers come from Mangrove River. They share a history and "bad blood" with the Braxton brothers – Brax (Steve Peacocke), Heath (Dan Ewing) and Casey (Lincoln Younes) – an established family who arrived in 2011.

In the first episode, Josh watches on as Andy throws a glass bottle at the Summer Bay sign. Andy tells Josh that they have come to the Bay, so he can check up on the Braxton brothers, after he saw their mother in his local pub. Andy discovers the Braxtons have left town for Heath's bucks night. Josh recalls that Andy was in juvie with Heath and realises Andy is trying to settle a score with him. Andy tells Josh that the Braxtons were responsible for their father leaving. In the third episode, Andy chases after Josh, who storms out of their house following his expulsion from school. Josh tells Andy that stole an exam paper and hid it under their house. Andy offers his help in getting rid of it. Josh meets up with Andy, after he goes to the Braxton's restaurant, and tells him Heath's wedding is back on. He then asks Andy what is going on. Andy explains that their father was friends with Danny Braxton (Andy McPhee) and took part in an armed robbery that went wrong. He then left the family to avoid the police.

=== Introduction ===
Josh's introductory storyline to Home and Away began with him attending Heath's wedding reception on the beach, where he met Maddy Osborne (Kassandra Clementi). Clementi told an Inside Soap columnist that Maddy's first impression of Josh was that he was "handsome and mysterious". After spending the evening talking, Maddy decided that kissing Josh would be the perfect way to make Casey jealous. When Casey noticed Josh and Maddy together, he intervened as he was suspicious of Josh and dragged Maddy away. As Casey was driving Maddy home, Josh and Andy came up behind them in their vehicle and rammed them, forcing them off the road. Casey and Maddy's car crashed, but Casey managed to get her out before it exploded. He then passed out due to his serious injuries.

Casey was left paralysed following the crash. When his older brother, Brax, learnt from Maddy that Josh and Andy were responsible, he attacked Josh. Brax pinned him to the bonnet of his car and was set to punch him when Maddy and Bianca Scott (Lisa Gormley) intervened. When Brax learned that Josh had been sleeping on the beach, he surprised him by offering him a place to stay. Gallagher told a TV Week writer that Josh was "unsure about Brax's offer" and did not understand why he wanted to help him out, especially after what he and Andy did to Casey. Gallagher said Josh did not trust Brax, but the offer was tempting as he did not want to stay on the beach anymore. The actor also explained that Josh's attitude towards the Braxton brothers had always been influenced Andy. He added, "deep down, he doesn't hold the anger and resentment Andy does. His attitude towards them isn't necessarily changing, but he is seeing another side to them."

=== Shooting ===
After Brax visited Josh and Andy's mother Debbie (Olivia Pigeot), he began acting strangely, causing his partner Ricky Sharpe (Bonnie Sveen) to suspect that he might be Josh's father. However, Brax soon confessed to killing Josh's father Johnny Barrett (Stephen Anderton) several years ago. Ricky begged Brax to keep quiet about Johnny's death, but he told the police and was charged. On the day of Brax's trial, Andy planned to take his revenge on his rival by shooting him. He told Josh that he had bought a gun, as he believed prison was too good for Brax. Speaking to an Inside Soap reporter, Gallagher said Josh did not think Andy shooting Brax was a good idea because he would end up going to prison himself. Josh had just found out his father was dead, he did not want to lose his brother too. Brax was sentenced to fifteen years in prison and as he was being led out of court, Josh begged Andy to reconsider. But when Andy went to get the gun from his car, he discovered it was missing.

Josh and Andy soon realised that Debbie had taken the gun, with the intention of shooting Brax herself. Josh went into a panic and Gallagher explained, "in an effort to stop his mum, he puts himself in the firing line. So the bullet meant for Brax hits him in the chest." As Debbie realised she had just shot her son, Brax was led away to jail, leaving Andy and Ricky to help Josh. While Josh was recovering in hospital, Nate Cooper (Kyle Pryor) became concerned that he might develop pneumonia. Ricky stayed by Josh's side, after telling him that Brax wanted her to watch over him. Weeks later, Johnny's body was located and Josh and Andy returned to the Bay with his ashes and belongings. While they were going through Johnny's wallet they found a photo of a baby that neither of them recognised. Brax later saw the photo and realised it was Casey. After speaking to his mother, he learnt that Johnny was Casey's biological father, making him and Josh half-brothers.

=== Relationship with Evelyn MacGuire ===
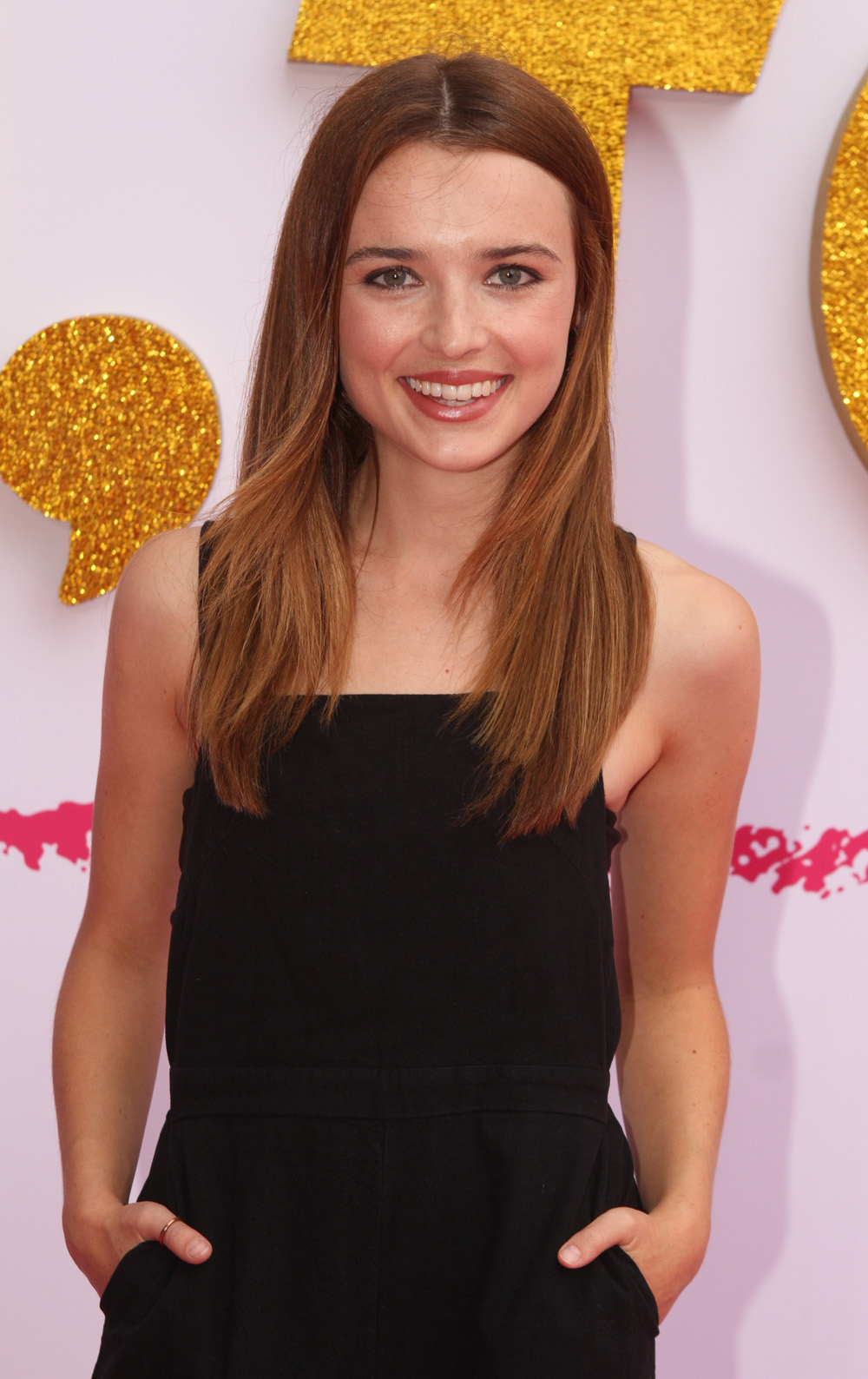
Phillipa Northeast (pictured) plays Evelyn MacGuire, Josh's second love interest.

When Evelyn MacGuire (Phillipa Northeast) revealed that she had a crush on Josh, Maddy exposed it to all their friends, leading to a confrontation between him and Evie. Josh went on to develop feelings for Evie. His relationship with Maddy began to suffer when she pushed him away and turned to Spencer for support, as their foster mother was ill. After fighting with Maddy, Josh meet Evie on the beach and they spend the day together at the farmhouse. At the farm, they came across an escaped horse and Josh suggested they ride it back to its owner. After the journey, Josh helped Evie to dismount and as she fell into his arms, they got "caught up in the moment" and kissed. They both agreed that the kiss was a mistake, but struggled to "keep their hands off each other" and were spotted kissing at the bus stop by Marilyn Chambers (Emily Symons) Gallagher stated "This kiss feels right at the time, but Josh is consumed by guilt about what he's doing to Maddy." He told Shannon Molloy of TV Week that Josh realised he no longer had feelings for Maddy. He also said that he had seen a lot of support for a relationship between Josh and Evie from viewers.

Weeks later, Josh decided to break up with Maddy, as he did not want to hide his feelings for Evie any longer. Josh confessed to Maddy that he had kissed Evie, leaving her heartbroken and humiliated. Clementi commented that Maddy knew deep down that something was wrong with their relationship, but she was hoping she was wrong. As Josh and Evie started openly dating, Maddy used Evie's brother Oscar (Jake Speer) to get back at them. Weeks later, Josh and Evie's relationship was tested by his infidelity with Maddy. In the wake of Casey's death, Josh turned to Maddy for comfort and they had a one-night stand. Josh had immediate regrets and apologised to Evie, but she refused to hear him out. She felt that Josh had sought Maddy out, as she had told him she was not ready to have sex yet. Evie later realised that she wanted her relationship with Josh to go back to how it was before his infidelity. She met with Josh to tell him that she wanted to get back together and he agreed. When Evie made it clear she was ready to consummate their relationship, Josh got "cold feet" as he did not want her first time to be in the back of a car. Evie felt rejected, but Josh then surprised her with a romantic gesture and they had sex.

Evie broke up with Josh after he started using drugs. He attempted to win her back, but she resisted. Josh asked Evie to have a coffee with him and look at some HSC brochures he had received. She turned him down, but agreed to help him with his submission essay for a course. Josh asked her out to dinner, but Evie told him she only came over as a friend. Northeast commented that Evie and Josh had a strong connection, and would always be involved in each other's lives. She wanted them to get back together, as she enjoyed working with Gallagher. A month later, Josh and Evie were reunited and during a visit to the city, Josh "impulsively" proposed to Evie, who accepted.

=== Assault and kidnap ===
In 2014, Josh was written into Andy's drug dealing storyline. Josh was set upon and physically assaulted by the drug dealers Andy was working for, after they mistook him for his brother. Josh turned to Evie for help and came to the farmhouse, where her aunt Hannah Wilson (Cassie Howarth) treated his wounds. Evie realised that Andy was the intended target and he begged Hannah not to call the police, claiming that the drugs she found at the house some days prior belonged to her brother-in-law Zac MacGuire (Charlie Clausen). Josh saw through Andy's lie and Hannah soon got the truth out of him. Andy insisted that he was trying to support Josh, but she threw him out. Hara commented that as Andy was "incredibly protective of his little brother", he felt responsible for what happened. Maddy was not pleased when she learnt Josh had stayed the night at Evie's. Even after she found out he was attacked, she felt he should have turned to her.

Weeks later, Josh and Evie were kidnapped and held hostage. While they were along at the Braxtons' house, three drug dealers led by Cody Dalton (Aaron Glenane) turned up and dragged the couple to the farmhouse, where they were tied up. Cody then forced Josh to leave Andy a voicemail message for Andy. Gallagher told an Inside Soap reporter, "Josh is aware that these guys are serious. They've already bashed up him and Andy pretty bad, and Josh really doesn't want Evie to get hurt." Andy received Josh's message and he and Brax soon showed up. Andy gave Cody the money to pay off his debt, but when Cody tried to extort more money, Brax intimidated him and the other men into leaving. Gallagher said Josh was "very relieved" when they left, but he and Evie were left "shaken up" by the ordeal. The actor also said Josh was furious with his brother for putting Evie in danger.

Andy later joined forces with criminal Jake Pirovic (Fletcher Humphrys), after becoming resentful of the growing bond between Josh and Brax. Andy was initially unaware that Jake had previously killed Brax's partner, and what the details of his revenge plan against Brax were. Brax believed Andy when he told him he was trying to stop dealing drugs, as did Josh and Casey. When Brax invited Andy over to his house to help Josh get ready for his formal, Andy was surprised by the warm, family atmosphere and realised that they did not deserve what Jake was planning. Andy told Jake that he did not want anything bad happening to Brax, but Jake said it was too late and he had Josh kidnapped off the street. Andy and Casey managed to find Josh, but Jake escaped. When Brax arrived, Jake fired a gun through the window and the bullet hit Casey, killing him.

=== Coward punch ===
Josh became central to a storyline focusing on the consequences of a coward punch. Evie turned to Josh when her new boyfriend Tank Snelgrove (Reece Milne) held her hostage. After receiving a distressed message from her, Josh immediately raced to her location to rescue her. Gallagher said that Josh was worried, as he knew what type of guy Tank was, as he had grown up with people just like him. After Josh brought Evie home, everyone believed the ordeal was over. However, when Oscar spotted Tank outside, Josh went out to confront him. Tank then came up behind Josh and punched him, causing Josh to fall and hit his head on the ground. He was not discovered until the following morning. Josh was rushed to hospital in a critical condition and Gallagher explained, "Josh could die. He's in a coma on life support. It appears he's brain-dead – there's a real chance this could be the end."

=== Murder confession and departure ===
During the final episode of 2015, guest character Charlotte King (Erika Heynatz) was seen meeting a mystery person near the pool, before she was shot and killed. Josh was named as one of eleven suspects in her death. Kerry Barrett of All About Soap stated "Yes, we know he's blind. But what if his sight's back just in time for him to take his revenge on Charlotte? Stranger things have happened in Summer Bay..." In early May 2016, it was finally revealed that Josh had fatally shot Charlotte. Constable Kat Chapman (Pia Miller) worked out Josh was the shooter, after examining some evidence found at the crime scene which belonged to him. She asked him to meet her and he explained that after he had got his sight back that evening. He was angry that she had killed Evie's half-sister Denny Miller (Jessica Grace Smith) and that she knew Andy had killed Jake Pirovic (Fletcher Humphrys). As he confronted her, Josh reached for his phone and Charlotte pulled a gun on him. He tried to defend himself and in the struggle, he accidentally shot her. Josh asked Kat to hold off on arresting him, as Evie had just suffered the loss of her brother and aunt, and she agreed.

On 14 May, Kerry Harvey of Stuff.co.nz reported that Gallagher would be leaving Home and Away. Josh's last scenes were broadcast on 5 July 2016. His exit storyline saw him and his brother Andy flee Summer Bay to avoid going to prison. After confessing to killing Charlotte, Josh was charged with her manslaughter. Evie was "devastated" when she learned Josh had killed Charlotte. Ahead of his sentencing, the couple shared "an emotional farewell" at the police station, where they remembered their first kiss. Josh then told Evie that going to prison meant his life was over. At the court, Josh was sentenced to a minimum of twenty years. As he was led away from the court, Josh pushed the guard to the ground and he ran to a getaway car driven by Andy. Following his escape, Josh sent Evie a goodbye text message, telling her she would never hear from him again. Josh and Andy are later captured and taken to prison (off-screen), where it is revealed that Josh has a new girlfriend. This upsets Evie, who soon develops a relationship with Matt Page.

== Reception ==
Following the Barrett's introduction, a TV Week columnist quipped "watch out, Braxtons – the Barrett boys are after your crown as Summer Bay's resident bad lads!" Lucy Thomas of SheRa magazine dubbed Josh "the current misunderstood bad boy character". A TV Week writer dubbed Josh and Maddy "Summer Bay's cute couple" and commented "they're young, they're gorgeous and they're in love." A Daily Record reporter observed, "The attraction between Josh and Evelyn has been obvious for a while". Mark James Lowe from All About Soap said their kiss was "ill-advised", but that it "will come as a shock to nobody, as they've been fighting their attraction to each other for weeks."
