= Charlotte King (Home and Away) =

Fictional character from Home and Away

- Home and Away character
- Portrayed by: Erika Heynatz
- Duration: 2015–2016
- First appearance: 23 June 2015
- Last appearance: 5 May 2016
- Introduced by: Lucy Addario
In-universe information
- Occupation: Biology teacher
- Father: Ernest King
- Mother: Peggy King
- Sons: Hunter King

Charlotte King is a fictional character from the Australian soap opera Home and Away, played by Erika Heynatz. She made her first screen appearance during the episode broadcast on 25 June 2015.

== Creation and casting ==
Script executive Dan Bennett intended for Charlotte to become the show's next villain from the start. Series producer Lucy Addario said Charlotte would be central to many plots and she would also make enemies that want to see her leave Summer Bay. On 10 January 2015, Briana Domjen of The Daily Telegraph reported that actress and singer Erika Heynatz had joined the cast of Home and Away as a school teacher. Heynatz admitted to being nervous during her audition for the role, but loved the character breakdown. The role marked Heynatz's first television acting job, and she began filming her first scenes during the week commencing 12 January.

Of joining the cast, Heynatz commented "Just like with any new job or new environment, there are always some nerves. But ultimately, I am really thrilled. It feels like the perfect timing, the perfect role and the character is going to be a lot of fun to play." Heynatz said she would turn to her mother and mother-in-law for advice as they were both teachers, and she hoped that her character would be well received by the students. Heynatz had been filming with the show for six months before her character debuted. The actress told Chloe Lal of Woman's Day that she was happy waiting because it prevented her being critical of her portrayal and gave her time to learn. She made her first screen appearance on 23 June 2015.

== Development ==
=== Introduction and characterisation ===
Charlotte is a biology teacher, who joined the staff at the local high school. Heynatz said that Charlotte came to Summer Bay for a fresh start, something that the actress could relate to. Charlotte was also hiding "a secret history" that was set to affect one of the show's established couples. Debbie Schipp for news.com.au commented that Charlotte would not have a low key arrival, while Heynatz added "there's no slinking into the show in the background – she definitely makes an entrance." When Heynatz read the character breakdown, she was "immediately drawn to her resilience, her instincts and her duplicitous nature." Charlotte is scandalous and has many secrets.

Ahead of Charlotte's secret being revealed in August, a reporter for TV Week noted that "it could spell chaos for several people". During a community fundraiser for Leah Patterson-Baker (Ada Nicodemou) and Zac MacGuire (Charlie Clausen), Charlotte was caught off-guard when Hunter King (Scott Lee) turned up and told the attendees that he was her son and Zac was his father. Zac was unaware that he had fathered a child with Charlotte and was "gobsmacked" by the revelation. As Charlotte confirmed that Hunter was his son, Zac struggled to understand how she kept it from him and ended up rejecting Hunter. As Zac later forged a relationship with his son, Charlotte realised she still had feelings for him. When Zac and Leah ended their engagement, Charlotte invited Zac to stay with her and Hunter. She then tried to kiss him, but he rejected her.

=== Matt Page ===
"Back at the bar, it would never have occurred to Charlotte that the liaison she had was with a student. It was an innocent mistake. But, what happens after that is what people will base their judgements on when it comes to this character."

— Heynatz on Charlotte and Matt's relationship

Charlotte's first storyline was an affair with school student Matt Page (Alec Snow). She did not initially know that he was a student as they embarked on a one-night stand. The storyline was first discussed by Home and Away producer Lucy Addario; who revealed to Stephen Downie of TV Week that Matt would become embroiled in a new relationship. Fearing other Summer Bay residents will not approve, they conduct their affair in secrecy. Heynatz and Snow did not have time to get better acquainted before they filmed their character's first passionate encounter. Heynatz told Kerry Harvey from Stuff.co.nz that it worked well for the scene, which was a "sexy chance meeting, inherent with all its awkward moments." She added that a "lasting connection" develops between the two characters, but branded their relationship a dangerous one.

The couple were pushed together by Leah, who asked Charlotte to tutor Matt. Charlotte realised that she should not be with Matt, but could not help herself when he kissed her. As Charlotte and Matt continued seeing each other, Maddy Osborne (Kassandra Clementi) soon found out about the relationship and urged Matt to end it.

=== Denny's death and blackmail ===
When Denny Miller (Jessica Grace Smith) made an unannounced visit to Charlotte's flat to offer Hunter her old job, she caught Charlotte with the stolen safe from the Diner. As Denny realised that Hunter had been responsible for the break-in, she urged Charlotte to go to the police. A fight broke out between the two women as Denny tried to take the safe. Charlotte pushed Denny away, causing her to hit her head and die. Despite knowing Denny's death was an accident, Charlotte did not report it to the police. Instead, she buried Denny's body and her belongings out in the bush. Heynatz commented that Charlotte would do anything to protect her son. Not long after, Charlotte began suffering from hallucinations and started seeing Denny around the flat. The images continued to appear, as Charlotte worked to cover up her crime. She hacked into Denny's social media accounts to make it seem like she was alive and enjoying her overseas trip. One particular hallucination of Denny caused Charlotte to throw a glass at a mirror, shattering it. When Andy Barrett (Tai Hara) stops by to ask her out to dinner, he becomes worried by the scene. Hara commented, "it's a side of Charlotte that Andy's never seen. Obviously seeing the glass is a shock." Andy was aware that Charlotte had previously covered up the fact Hunter burnt down Leah's house. Andy believed that she might be covering for Hunter again, but Charlotte refused to talk about it.

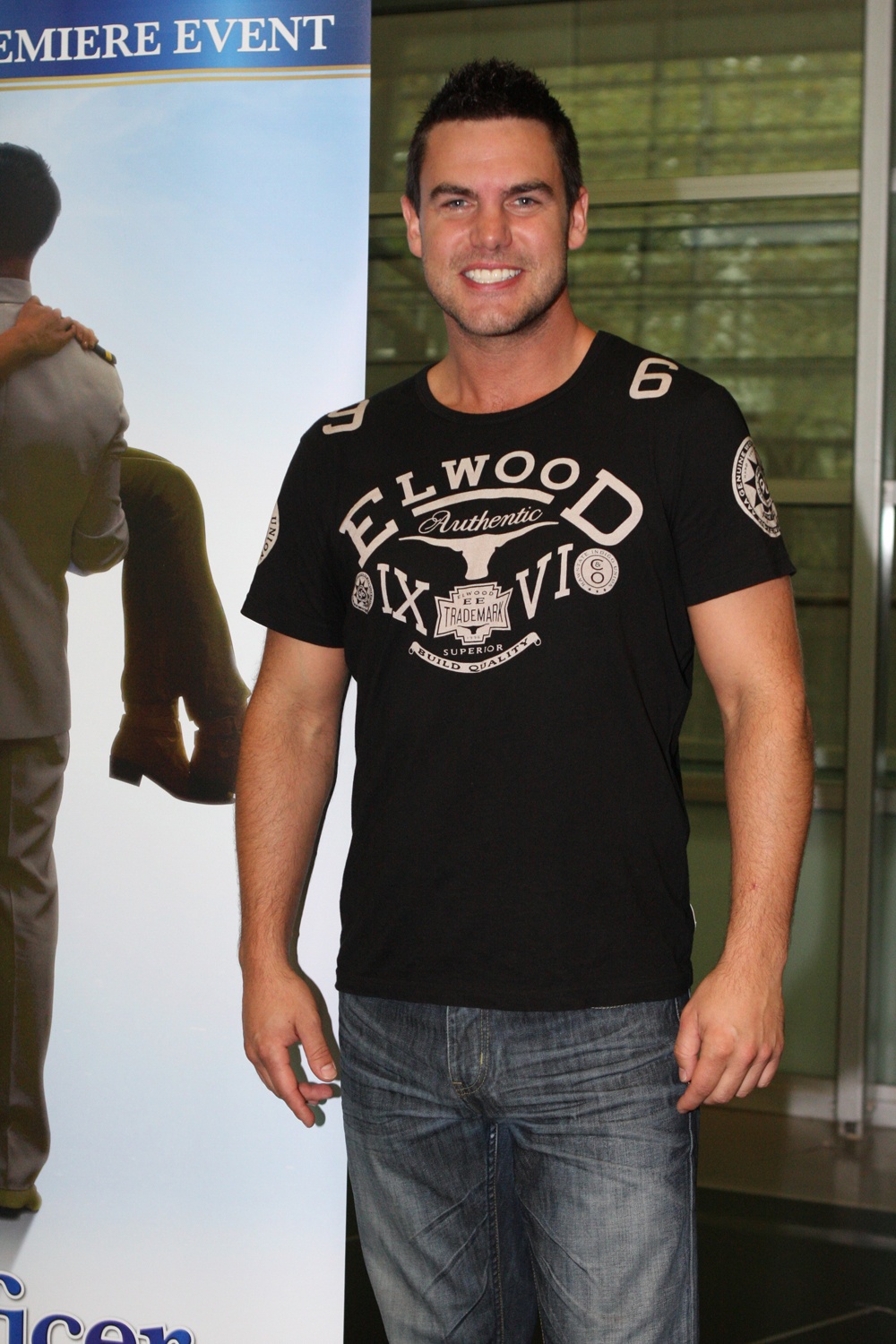
Trystan Powell, played by Ben Mingay (pictured), was introduced to stir up Charlotte's story arc.

Charlotte also became the victim of a stalker in the wake of Denny's death. She began receiving notes telling her that someone was watching her every move. As she continued her affair with Matt, his friend Josh Barrett (Jackson Gallagher) asked her to end it, causing Charlotte to lash out and accuse him of sending the notes. Josh then told Matt what had happened, and Matt felt obliged to offer his help. Snow said, "he wants to help her and be that man who steps up and solves all her problems." Charlotte continued to struggle with the images of Denny and the presence of her stalker. Heynatz told Stephen Downie of TV Week that it was a "scary time" for Charlotte. She continued, "She's carrying the burden of guilt over Denny's death and is fearful of the real threat of someone watching her." The actress also said Charlotte was desperate to protect Hunter no matter what, even if it meant lying to him about her strange behaviour.

When actor Ben Mingay joined the cast as Trystan Powell, he revealed that his character would cause "a massive headache" for Charlotte. Mingay explained that Trystan would be stirring up Charlotte's storyline and believed that as she was disliked by a lot of viewers, Trystan would be "a bit of a welcome villain". It later emerged that Trystan was Charlotte's stalker and that he was working on behalf of incarcerated criminal Trevor "Gunno" Gunson (Diarmid Heidenreich). Gunno believed former prison inmate Darryl "Brax" Braxton (Steve Peacocke) was not dead, and he wanted Charlotte to find out information from his friends and family. Charlotte later handed over a large sum of money to Trystan, obtained from Hunter's trust fund. This caused a rift between Charlotte and Hunter and he moved in with Zac. Hunter told Zac that Charlotte had stolen from him and that she had also been having a sexual relationship with Matt. When Charlotte went to Angelo's for a drink, she began flirting with Brax's brother Kyle Braxton (Nic Westaway), who was unaware that she had an ulterior motive.

As Trystan continued to pressure her to find out the truth about Brax, Charlotte realised that Kyle might know something. Charlotte went to his house to look for clues, but Kyle soon caught her and she made it clear that she was attracted to him. Westaway told an Inside Soap writer, "Kyle has been working hard recently, so to have a gorgeous woman like Charlotte make a move on him isn't the worst thing ever!" Charlotte and Kyle spent the afternoon together, and the writer noted that Kyle appeared to have fallen "hook, line and sinker" for Charlotte. When Kyle later saw Charlotte being hassled by Trystan, and then learnt that he was black mailing her, Kyle attacked him. The incident prompted Constable Katarina Chapman (Pia Miller) to become involved and she questioned Charlotte about the nature of her relationship with Trystan.

When Trystan demanded to know what Charlotte had found out about Brax, she begged him for more time. He then had Hunter kidnapped and dumped in the bush by the road. After learning what happened, Charlotte called Trystan and confronted him in her car, where he then threatened her. Upon Trystan leaving the car, Carena Crawford from All About Soap observed "he's forgetting one thing about Ms King – she's a killer! And pushed to the extreme, she makes a split-second decision and slams on the accelerator, charging towards Trystan!" After hitting Trystan with her car, Charlotte got out and looked at his body, as Irene Roberts (Lynne McGranger) arrived on the scene. When Kat came to question her, Charlotte said Trystan had stepped out in front of her. However, Kat soon learned that Trystan's injuries were not consistent with Charlotte's story and she remembered that Trystan had been harassing her. When Trystan later died, Kat realised that Charlotte had not been entirely honest with her.

=== Targeting Kat Chapman ===
Kat believed Charlotte was responsible for Trystan's death, and during a confrontation she told Charlotte that she would soon be able to prove it. As Kat made it her mission to prove Charlotte deliberately ran down Trystan, Charlotte retaliated by spiking Kat's drink at Angelo's, while Kat was in the bathroom. The drug left Kat groggy and unable to walk straight. She collapsed to the ground and Charlotte took the chance to steal her gun and handcuffs. She then placed an unconscious Kat in her patrol car. As she came round, Kat managed to catch Kyle's attention before collapsing again. Westaway told Melissa Field of TV Week that the circumstances left Kyle feeling unsettled and he immediately suspected Charlotte was behind the incident. Kat was rushed to the hospital, where she asked the doctor to check her blood for drugs, but the test came back negative, except for a large amount of alcohol. Kat tried to explain that she had been set up, while an unsettled Kyle confronted Charlotte about the incident.

Kat continued to investigate Charlotte despite being suspended for having alcohol in her system. She started to suspect Charlotte might also be involved in Denny's disappearance, and confronted her about Denny's connection to Trystan and Gunno. Although Charlotte "coolly pleads her ignorance", it left Kat more suspicious of her. Desperate not to get caught out by Kat, Charlotte targeted her again. As Kat was searching through Denny's belongings at the Farmhouse, she was hit from behind by two men and left next to the oven with the gas on. Charlotte then received a text message informing her that Kat had been dealt with per her plan. Charlotte was "filled with relief that her problem has seemingly been sorted".

=== Who Shot Charlotte? ===
In November 2015, Sophie Dainty of Digital Spy reported that a major character would be killed off in the season finale, broadcast on 9 December. Dainty revealed that the character would die after being shot, but further details were being held back until the scenes were aired. TV Week confirmed that the victim would be either Charlotte, Hunter, Kat or Ash. Dainty added that the repercussions of the death would continue into 2016. On 9 December, Charlotte was revealed to be the victim when she was shot by an unseen culprit, who she knew.

In the lead up to the shooting, Charlotte gatecrashed Zac and Leah's wedding intent on getting revenge. She was also carrying Kat's stolen gun in her bag. During the ceremony, Charlotte announced that she knew all of the secrets in Summer Bay and was prepared to expose them. Hunter managed to lead her away, but they argued and Charlotte said that she had sacrificed everything for him. She eventually left the wedding, which continues without any more problems. During the reception, Kat informs Denny's family that Charlotte was responsible for her death. Elsewhere, Kyle informed Andy and Josh that she had threatened him. While Andy admitted that she knew he had killed Jake Pirovic (Fletcher Humphrys). Ash told Phoebe that he had to stop Charlotte telling Ricky that Brax is still alive, while Hunter left town. Charlotte was standing near the local pool when she heard someone approach her. There was a brief fight and she is shot. Charlotte's body then falls into the sea.

Charlotte's death started a "whodunit" storyline. There were ten suspects, which included Evelyn MacGuire (Philippa Northeast), Oscar MacGuire (Jake Speer), Zac MacGuire, Irene Roberts, Hunter King, Leah Patterson-Baker, Andy Barrett, Josh Barrett, Matt Page, Kyle Braxton, Martin Ashford (George Mason) and Olivia Fraser Richards (Raechelle Banno). Nicodemou explained that the cast and crew did not know the identity of the shooter, and each suspect filmed a different ending to keep the conclusion to the storyline from being leaked. Viewers were invited to download an app, so they could begin their own investigation. Nicodemou thought it would be funny if someone worked it out before the cast did. She also said that it would take a while for the truth to come out and that some people would be wrongly accused. She quipped, "Basically Charlotte is dead but she keeps ruining all our lives in the Bay for a long time." Nicodemou added that she always knew Heynatz's character would be killed off, but asked the series producer not to make her bad, as she wanted Heynatz to stay around for longer.

In a 90-minute episode broadcast on 5 May 2016, Charlotte's killer was revealed to be Josh. After looking at the evidence one last time, Kat realised that a piece recovered from the crime scene belonged to Josh. When she confronted him, he explained that his motives for killing Charlotte were Denny's murder and her knowledge of Andy's role in Jake Pirovic's death. Flashbacks revealed that Josh had regained his sight that evening and he went to find Charlotte. She aimed the gun at Josh, but in the ensuing struggle, he ended up shooting her.

== Storylines ==
While enjoying a drink at Angelo's, Charlotte notices Matt Page and he joins her at her table. Charlotte goes back to Matt's caravan and they have sex. The following day, Charlotte goes to the high school and Zac introduces her to Leah Patterson-Baker as his former girlfriend and the new biology teacher. Charlotte soon realises that Matt is a student and they both agree to keep their one-night stand a secret. Charlotte helps Josh Barrett locate his brother Andy, who has taken off in his car while intoxicated. Leah later asks Charlotte to tutor Matt and she reluctantly agrees. During their first session, Charlotte and Matt reignite their affair. Maddy later witnesses Matt trying to give Charlotte a flower and works out that they are dating. Matt takes photos of himself and Charlotte in bed together. Matt informs Charlotte that Maddy knows about them, and she threatens Maddy. Charlotte then ends things with Matt. When Leah tries to work out who she is dating, Charlotte panics and Andy lies that it is him. Matt threatens to release the photos and Charlotte tries to take his phone. He later tells her that the photos are on his laptop. When Leah's house burns down, Matt accuses Charlotte. He later apologises and they agree to move on. Charlotte and Andy kiss and begin dating for real. Charlotte gives Zac a loan after he learns the house insurance lapsed. Charlotte's son Hunter King (Scott Lee) breaks into her motel room and then demands to be introduced to his father – Zac. Charlotte later realises that Hunter set fire to Zac and Leah's house. Charlotte admits to Andy that she is still in love with Zac. She later tries to kiss Zac, but he rejects her and returns to Leah.

Charlotte learns that Hunter stole the Diner's safe and left Marilyn Chambers (Emily Symons) injured, Charlotte refuses to let Hunter confess to the police and orders him to leave the Bay. A week later, Charlotte gets an unexpected visit from Zac's niece, Denny Miller, who stops by on her way to the airport to see if Hunter wants to take her job at the bait shop. Denny notices the Diner safe and she tries to take it. The two women fight and Charlotte pushes Denny away, causing her to hits her head and die. After initially deciding to call the police, Charlotte panics and later buries Denny and her belongings in the bush. Charlotte subsequently suffers nightmares about the incident. Charlotte overhears from Denny's family and friends that Denny has not updated her social media account, so she breaks into the Farmhouse and takes her diary to update her account. Trystan Powell (Ben Mingay) appears in the Bay and reveals to Charlotte that he knows she killed Denny. He begins blackmailing her into giving him money. Charlotte steals Hunter's trust fund money to pay Trystan. She and Matt continue their relationship, until Hunter tells Zac and Leah. Charlotte is fired from her job.

Hunter moves in with Zac and Leah, which devastates Charlotte. Trystan explains to Charlotte that he and Trevor Gunson (Diarmid Heidenreich) believe Darryl Braxton (Steve Peacocke) is still alive and they want her to get information from his family and friends. Charlotte gets close to Brax's brother, Kyle Braxton, after he gives her a job. Charlotte realises many of the residents have turned against her after her car is covered in rubbish and a brick is thrown through her window. When she argues with Irene Roberts, Olivia Fraser Richards takes against her. Charlotte threatens Olivia, and in revenge, Olivia vandalises Charlotte's apartment. Charlotte learns from Alf Stewart (Ray Meagher) that Trystan had Hunter kidnapped and left in the bush. Charlotte confronts Trystan about the kidnapping. After Trystan leaves her car, Charlotte drives it at him, causing him serious injuries. He dies the following day. Charlotte tells Irene and Constable Katarina Chapman that it was an accident, but Kat refuses to believe her.

Charlotte receives a call from Trevor Gunson who asks her to visit him in prison. Gunno is unhappy that Charlotte killed Trystan and refuses to believe her when she says it was an accident, reminding her that she also murdered Denny. Charlotte tells Gunno that she is done working for him. When Kat questions Charlotte about her visit to Gunno, Charlotte tells her that Gunno is her ex-boyfriend. Martin "Ash" Ashford knows that Gunno is not her ex-boyfriend and she gets him to admit that Brax is alive. She agrees to keep the secret.

Charlotte spikes Kat's drink and when Kat passes out, Charlotte steals her gun and handcuffs. When Kat becomes convinced Charlotte is behind the incident, Charlotte contacts Gunno and arranges for his henchman to kill Kat. They are unsuccessful. A week later, Denny's body is found. Charlotte asks Hunter and Kyle for money, but they refuse her. After overhearing Ash's conversation about Billie being framed for the fire at Leah's house, Charlotte breaks into Ash's caravan and plants Kat's handcuffs in Billie's bag, framing her for drugging Kat too. Ash confronts Charlotte and has to be pulled off of her. Kat finds evidence that proves Charlotte killed Denny and comes to arrest Charlotte, but she has already left the flat. Charlotte turns up at Leah and Zac's wedding and threatens to reveal everyone's secrets. She leaves and goes to the pier, where she is approached by someone she knows. The unseen person shoots Charlotte and she falls into the sea. Her body is recovered the following day. Months later, as the investigation is being closed down, Kat realises Josh Barrett killed Charlotte. He explains that after he regained his eyesight, he found Charlotte by the pier and during a confrontation, she pulled Kat's gun on him. As Josh tried to defend himself, the gun went off and Charlotte was shot.

== Reception ==
Harvey (Stuff.co.nz) branded Charlotte a "femme fatale" and "the woman currently turning things upside down in Summer Bay". She added that there is "scandal there is aplenty" when Charlotte is around. After Leah asked Charlotte to tutor Matt, a South Wales Echo reporter noted that "it's lessons in love he will be receiving". An Inside Soap contributor branded Charlotte "wicked", while another called her a "bad girl". A reporter for the Liverpool Echo dubbed her a "villainess".

A Soaplife contributor stated, "Crazy Charlotte King's certainly made more than a few waves since she arrived in Summer Bay last year. In fact, she's nothing short of a one-woman tsunami." They also pointed out that Charlotte had a long list of "extra-curricular mayhem", adding "make no mistake, she's a piece of work!" Carena Crawford from All About Soap said of "cunning" Charlotte, "what a nasty piece of work!" After she was evicted and Hunter was kidnapped, a Sunday Mail reporter observed, "Charlotte's troubles are piling up with biblical force". They added that she went into "full vengeance mode" because of these events. A reporter for the Belfast Telegraph thought Charlotte was "vindictive".

Following Charlotte's exit, a TV Week columnist quipped "Ding dong, the witch is dead!" They wrote that Charlotte had done "some terrible things" during her stint in the Bay, but believed that she was just trying to protect Hunter. The columnist added that it was not a surprise when she was shot. Sue Yeap of The West Australian praised the character, saying "Heynatz's murderous Charlotte has been one of the show's best baddies".
