= Andy Barrett =

Australian soap opera fictional character

- Home and Away character
- Portrayed by: Tai Hara
- Duration: 2013–2016
- First appearance: 28 August 2013
- Last appearance: 5 July 2016
- Introduced by: Lucy Addario
- Spin-off appearances: Home and Away Extras (2013)
In-universe information
- Occupation: Personal trainer Mechanic; Garage co–owner
- Mother: Debbie Barrett
- Stepfather: Johnny Barrett
- Half-brothers: Josh Barrett

Andy Barrett is a fictional character from the Australian soap opera Home and Away, played by Tai Hara. The character made his first screen appearance on 28 August 2013. Hara relocated to Sydney to take on the role. Kyle Pryor who plays fellow character Nate Cooper originally auditioned for the role. Andy and his half-brother Josh (Jackson Gallagher) were introduced to viewers through a series of online webisodes titled Home and Away Extras, prior to appearing in the main series. Andy is characterised as a troubled man because of his upbringing and disappearance of his father. Hara has described his character as "extremely unpredictable" and very protective of his brother. Andy has spent time in prison and causes trouble from his first episode. Andy's initial storyline was a feud with the Braxton family which had been ongoing before he was born. Through this story, writers involved Andy in crimes ranging from fights and car chases to explosions and shootings. Hara announced he would be departing from the show on 22 February 2016, after over three years in the role and Andy made his final appearance on 5 July 2016.

Producers created a romantic partnership between Andy and Hannah Wilson (Cassie Howarth). Their on/off relationship has been focused on heavily during his tenure. Andy is also involved in drug dealing which saw him temporarily separated from Hannah. His involvement leads to the death of Casey Braxton (Lincoln Younes), which prompts Andy to want to change his life. He sets on course to become a gym instructor, become literate and maintain a relationship with Hannah. The latter rarely goes well as they face problems such as Hannah's paralysis, her infidelity and Andy's temper. The character became popular with viewers as the Barrett brothers gained a fan-base. A reporter from The Daily Examiner said that Andy continually causes friction on the show. A writer from TV Soap noted that trouble follows Andy everywhere. They concluded that writers transformed the character from "rough customer" to "respectable citizen".

== Casting ==
The character and Hara's casting was reported by Debbie Schipp from The Daily Telegraph on 3 August 2013. Hara relocated from Gold Coast to Sydney to take on the role. Of being cast in Home and Away, Hara commented "I thought how lucky I was. It's just a real privilege to be on a show that is so loved." Andy was introduced to the show along with his brother Josh (Jackson Gallagher). The characters first appeared in online webisodes, which explored their backgrounds. The Barretts were initially rivals of the Braxton brothers and Hara said "There is a lot of history behind both the families. I carry the secrets of what our whole relationship is with them." Andy's debut on the main show was broadcast on 28 August 2013. British actor Kyle Pryor also auditioned for the role with an Australian accent. But producers thought he was better suited to the role of Nate Cooper.

== Development ==
=== Characterisation ===
Andy's father was his world during his formative years in Mangrove River. So Johnny Barrett’s disappearance was a devastating blow. In the aftermath, the Barrett family fell to pieces. Thirteen-year-old Andy tried to step up but he struggled to cope. Andy continued to carry the stress with him to school and began lashing out. He soon landed in juvie.

— An excerpt taken from the official Home and Away website outlining Andy's backstory.

Andy is characterised as an over-protective brother to Josh. He has an uncontrollable temper which leads gets him into trouble. His anger issues date back to the disappearance of his father which changed him and eventually led to him being reprimanded by the law. He is a "feisty" resident of the infamous Mangrove River who "thinks with his fists before thinking of consequences". He is a "loose cannon" and harbours a "volatile mood" which has gained him a significant criminal history. They added that his attitude would only carry on adding to his criminality. Hara told a Yahoo!7 reporter that "he's an extremely unpredictable and protective character and regardless of his circumstances, family always comes first." Andy was forced to take care of Josh in the absence of their father. Hara added that "although sometimes he lacks morals and normal social behaviour, everything he does for his brother, despite how reckless, it comes from a place of love."

=== Home and Away Extras ===
Andy and Josh were introduced to viewers in a series of four special online episodes titled Home and Away Extras, which were made available online from 7 August. The episodes gave fans a chance to see the characters prior to their on-screen arrival. They were written by Supervising Script Producer, Louise Bowes and directed by Danny Raco.

A promotional article stated that the footage would reveal a shared history and angst with the established characters of Brax (Steve Peacocke), Heath (Dan Ewing) and Casey Braxton (Lincoln Younes). To coincide with the content the show produced a series of additional content such as spoilers and cast interviews as extra promotion. Series Producer Lucy Addario created the "webisodes" because she wanted alternative ways for viewers to interact with the Home and Away brand. She added "we're going to reveal dramatic details of the characters' back-stories before they are introduced as a major storyline." Home and Away Extras completed its run on 26 August and Andy was introduced into the main show two days later.

=== Feud with the Braxton family ===
To introduce Andy and Josh into the main series Home and Away developed a feud storyline between the Barrett and the Braxton brothers. The established Braxton family were popular with viewers and garnered a large fan base. Hara was not worried about their popularity ruining the chances of his character being successful and believed the Barretts would gain their own fans. He warned that Andy does not get intimidated by anyone and would comfortably rival the Braxton brothers. Ewing told a TV Week reporter that the Braxtons would still be the "top dog" but the Barretts would give them "a run for their money". He believed his family had the advantage because they learned to carefully think about their actions whereas Andy is an "act first, think later" type of character.

The storyline began when Josh meets Maddy Osborne (Kassandra Clementi) at a party and she refuses to leave. Her friend Casey does not approve of Maddy trying to lose her virginity and starts an argument with Josh. Younes explained that Andy gets involved and they fight, but he manages to defuse the trouble. He added "Casey has no idea who these guys are. He's never met them, but they say that they have." When Casey and Maddy drive away Andy decides to start a car chase and runs Casey's car off the road causing an accident and explosion. He is left with life changing injuries. The crash and subsequent explosion were big stunt scenes for the show. The car chase scenes Andy featured in were filmed at night on location down a narrow road, the cast described the shoot as a "scary" scenario. When Casey's brother Brax learns that Andy and Josh caused the accident he attacks Josh. Bianca Scott (Lisa Gormley) intervenes but Brax hits Andy instead. Hara stated that "hot head" Andy is not afraid of a fight or Brax because of his upbringing. Andy and Brax have known each other for a long time and there was "bad blood" between them. He added that "revenge is something they've all grown up with. You strike someone and they strike back. I think Andy will be prepared whatever happens." Gallagher added that there is a "lot of unspoken history" between Andy and Brax.

The writers then decided to cause a divide between the Barrett brothers and added a new dynamic between Brax and Josh. Realising that Josh is homeless, Brax asks Josh to stay at his home. Gallagher explained that it was Andy's hatred that influenced Josh's feelings towards the Braxtons. His attitude does not change but he begins to see another side to Brax. The actor added, "deep down he doesn't hold the same anger and resentment Andy does." But the effect the Barrett's arrival has on Brax becomes apparent and he visits Debbie Barrett (Olivia Pigeot) to confess that he killed Andy's step-father Johnny Barrett (Stephen Anderton). Andy attacks Brax in retaliation. When Brax appears in court Andy considers shooting Brax. But Debbie steals the gun and tries to shoot Brax, but Josh is hit by the bullet but survives. The cast were not allowed to reveal who fired the shot before the episode aired. After this Andy becomes jealous that Josh is spending all his time with Maddy and spikes her drink. A reporter from TV Week wrote that following Maddy behaving erratically Josh punches his brother for his crime.

In a later development it is revealed that Johnny had slept with Cheryl Braxton (Suzi Dougherty) and had fathered Casey. Andy was angry with this and Hara told Shayn from The Edge that "he is never going to be considered a Barrett in Andy's eyes" and "Brax is not happy to learn his mother slept with their dad". He also explained that the Barrett and Braxton feud had been going on long before Andy was born.

=== Drug dealing ===
The show decided to begin Andy's journey through 2014 by exploring his "dark past". A guest character, Sean Green (Khan Chittenden) was introduced on-screen as Andy's old prison enemy. He targets Andy's livelihood by vandalising the gym he works at. Hara told Miller that it comes at a point in Andy's life when things were "looking up for him". It becomes apparent that Sean wants revenge because Andy made a deal to leave jail at Sean's expense by naming him for a crime. He threatens to hurt Josh and Maddy if he does not tell the truth. Hara added that "Andy feels responsible for putting them at risk, he doesn't want Josh involved in this." Andy tries to reason with Sean but he gathers a gang to punish the character. The storyline marked a turning point of the Braxton/Barrett feud as Casey gathers his family to help Andy and Kyle Braxton (Nic Westaway) rescues him by attacking Sean.

The show created a drug dealing storyline for Andy, which saw him trying to raise money to move out of the Summer Bay caravan park. He begins selling marijuana but his girlfriend Hannah Wilson (Cassie Howarth) destroys the drugs when she finds them in her home. This gets Andy into debt with the drug gang. In retaliation Josh is seriously assaulted by the gang. Hara told an Inside Soap reporter that Andy knows that the attack on Josh is a warning. He added that "he's incredibly protective of his little brother, so of course he feels responsible for what's happened." Despite Josh becoming involved in his predicament he cannot afford to pay his debt. Hara explained that his character is "dead broke" and "in some deep debt".

The storyline developed chaotically as Andy's debt continued to grow. He believes he can prolong paying his suppliers off by meeting up with them and pleading for more time. Hara said that it does not go according to plan and Andy is left with severe injuries following an assault and being thrown from a moving vehicle. The story sees Andy turning to Casey for help, Hara explained Andy's out-of-character actions were because the dealers are "unpredictable so everyone close to Andy is at risk." The storyline made way for a different dynamic between Andy and "arch-nemesis" Brax as he is forced to accept money from him to clear his debts. But Hara warned that his character would become more erratic, adding "Andy's heading down a path of self-destruction - and someone will pay for his mistakes."

Brynmor Pattison from the Irish Mirror observed the storyline as a "dramatic development that pulls many other characters into a vortex of trouble." While Hara explained that the drug dealing "will cause a domino effect that implicates numerous people and puts their lives at risk".

=== Casey's death ===
The main dealer is revealed to be Jake Pirovic (Fletcher Humphrys), unbeknownst to him the sworn enemy of the Braxton family. He uses Andy in his plan to enact revenge on Brax for killing his brother, Hammer (Benedict Samuel) . But when Andy tries to defy him, Josh is kidnapped and Andy if forced to beg Casey for help. Gallagher explained that Stephen Downie (TV Week) that Andy does not realise the severity of his involvement with Jake. He added that the storyline was "very heavy" viewing. Hara said that Andy no longer wants anything to do with Jake because "he's exploited and manipulated him into a situation that seems irreversible." The interviewers questioned why Casey would want to help Andy after his constant trouble making. Younes explained that his character "sees the best in Andy" and wants him to change his life for the better. When Casey realises that Jake is involved he tries to keep Brax out of the situation. But he fails and Andy, Brax, Casey and Kyle end up in a fatal confrontation with Jake. Home and Away's producers put an embargo on which character would be killed off in the scenes. They kept viewers guessing by confirming one character at the scene would definitely die. Following a shooting, Casey dies in Brax's arms.

Hara told Chantay Logan of the Gold Coast Bulletin that many fans were "devastated" following the death of Casey. But he noted that "a lot of them were sticking up for me too, there’s not that much hate there. It’ll be interesting to see if the audience goes along on the rest of Andy’s journey with him." Susan Hill from the Daily Star reported that Andy and Brax would team up to avenge Casey's death. But a high speed car chase results in a crash. Hara stated that "Andy and Brax need to end this before more people get killed." With Jake dead, Andy is left to face the wrath of other characters. But Brax is forgiving of his one-time-nemesis. Hara explained that "Brax doesn't blame Andy for what happened to Casey. He understands that Andy was manipulated by Jake."

=== Relationship with Hannah Wilson ===
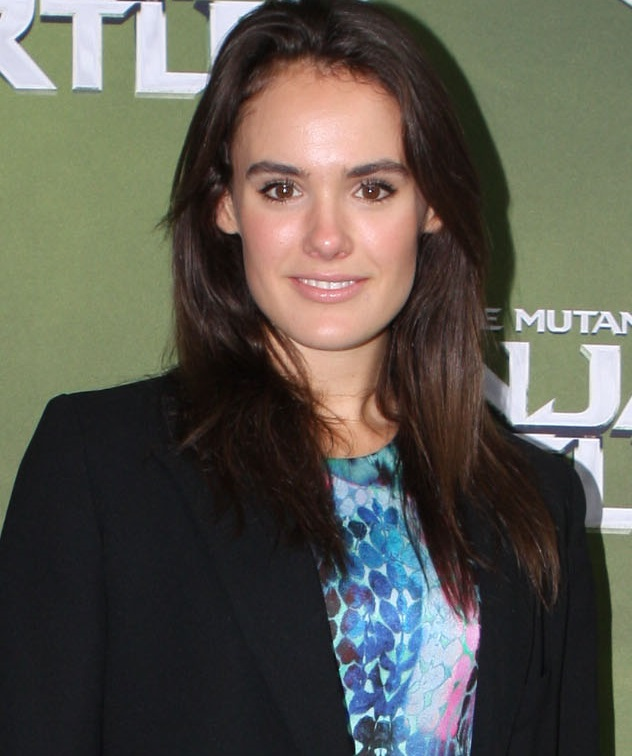
Cassie Howarth (pictured) plays Andy's love interest Hannah Wilson.

The show decided to renew the partnership between Andy and Hannah. She asks Andy to meet with her, feeling confused Andy asks Denny Miller (Jessica Grace Smith) how Hannah feels. But Denny still blames Andy for Casey's death and lies to him. Andy sleeps with Neive Devlin (Jolene Anderson) in retaliation.

Hannah is involved in a bus crash and is told she may never walk again. One aspect of the storyline showed Andy afraid to have sex with Hannah in case he hurt her due to her disability. Howarth was unhappy when she received the scripts because she believed that there were other topics that their storyline could have explored. But writers told Howarth that it is a "very real situation" and one they felt Home and Away needed to portray. Hannah presumes that she has become a burden on Andy. She wants to have sex and Andy's reluctance leaves Hannah feeling dejected. Howarth told an Inside Soap writer that Andy "freaks out" when Hannah tries to be intimate. They do not have the same physical relationship they once shared so he finds it "strange". Nate Cooper (Kyle Pryor) advises Andy that there is no medical reason not resume sexual activity, but Hannah ends their relationship before he can apologise. Howarth added that "Andy has become more like a carer to Hannah than a boyfriend, and she doesn't want that for either of them. She wants Andy to have the opportunity to be happy with someone else. She wishes for him to enjoy a normal life." Despite this their love for one another remains and the actress added that Andy chooses not to give up on their relationship. Andy knows that he still loves Hannah and tries to resume their relationship, asking Denny for help. Hara told Erin Miller (TV Week) that "Andy told Hannah he's not the same person he used to be. It's going to be a test for their relationship but he wants to prove that he loves her."

The pair get back together but Hannah soon becomes depressed because she cannot go outside. She decides to behave spontaneously and begs Andy to take her on a boat ride at sea. Howarth explains that being stuck at home has "taken its toll on her both physically and emotionally" and she is "desperate" to go outside. The writers throw the duo into yet another dangerous situation as their boat capsizes. With Hannah's paralysis she is unable to stay afloat and disappears beneath the water. Howarth added that it is dangerous because of her condition. Andy frantically searches for her to save her. Another problem the duo encounter is Andy's literacy problems when he needs help with revision for his personal trainer qualifications. He becomes angry and argumentative with Hannah despite her help. A TV Soap reporter stated that Andy "hated feeling like a five year old in front of her." But when he admits the truth to Josh he decides to apologise to Hannah. Josh struggles to mentor him but carries on knowing that Andy is trying to make Hannah proud of him.

Howarth told Kerry Harvey from TV Guide that Andy and Hannah "balance each other well", two opposites personality wise, but they get along so well. She concluded "I think with what's happened with the accident he's really risen to the occasion and he's been so good to her. I think at least for a while they'll be able to be happy." Following Hannah's recovery and reuse of her legs, Andy becomes jealous of Hannah's new found freedom. When he witnesses Hannah dancing with another man he becomes violent and punches him. Hara said that the bad side of Andy had not surfaced for sometime and likened him to the Hulk. He defended his character's overreaction, "imagine walking into a bar and seeing the one you love dancing with someone else." Hannah then meets her ex-boyfriend Sean Gleeson (Luke Pegler) and is unfaithful. Howarth said that her character "loves Andy and doesn't want to hurt him, but ultimately she's not happy." Hannah remembers how exciting her life was with Sean and doesn't feel the same when she is with Andy. She sleeps with Sean and is nearly caught by Andy. Hannah struggles with the guilt of cheating, but still decides she wants Sean instead. But Hannah is shocked to learn that Sean is married. Hannah realises that she has made a mistake and wants to keep her infidelity a secret. But Sean's wife arrives and confronts Hannah. Howarth told a TV Week reporter that the whole situation "blows up in her face". Hannah tells Sean that she is going to be honest with Andy, unaware that Josh has recorded her and Andy learns the truth.

=== Departure ===
On 22 February 2016, the Seven Network Twitter account announced Hara's departure from Home and Away. They implied that he was travelling overseas to Venice Beach. The actor stated, "My time on HAA has been a once in a lifetime experience that I'll never forget and I can't wait for what's to come!" Andy's exit storyline was not immediately revealed, but he is one of several suspects in the Charlotte King's (Erika Heynatz) murder.

== Reception ==
An Inside Soap reporter included "local bad boy" Andy and Hannah's romance in their "best bits of August [2014]" feature. They added that "there was no denying the heat between these two." They also included Andy's drug dealing as one of the best soap opera storylines airing in September 2014. A reporter from The Daily Examiner opined that Andy is a "bad boy" who causes much friction on the show. A writer from TV Soap opined that "trouble seems to have followed Josh and Andy wherever they've gone since arriving in town, with the two brothers quickly developing a reputation as rough customers." They added that despite their bad impression created on their arrival, there has been much work to transform the characters into "respectable citizens". A writer from the Sunday Mail opined "Andy is the sort of bloke who couldn't learn a lesson if you drilled it into his head. Having caused no end of hassle to an astoundingly large circle of people, what does he do? Take on another illegal job, that's what."
