= Diarmid Heidenreich =

Australian film and television actor (born 1975)

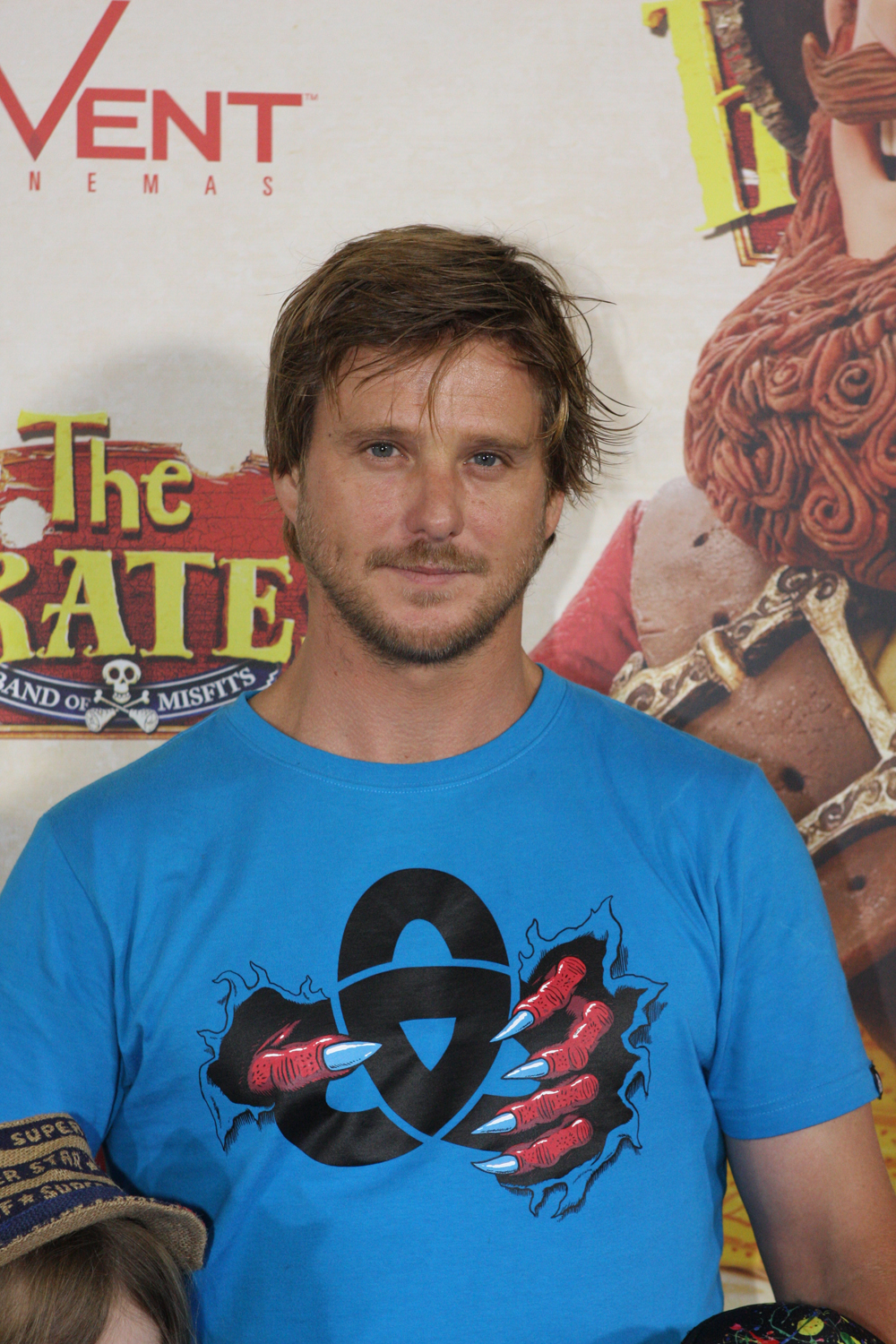
- Heidenreich in August 2012
- Born: Diarmid Heidenreich; 1975 (age 50–51); Australia
- Occupation: Television actor
- Known for: Pizza Hut commercials (as 'Dougie the Pizza Delivery Guy')

Diarmid Heidenreich (born 1975) is an Australian film and television actor. Heidenreich graduated from Waverley College in Sydney's east, in 1993 before going on to become a well-known actor.

== Television career ==
Heidenreich began his television career in 1993, appearing in G. P. as a guest role. Over the next few years, he had guest roles in several drama series, including Echo Point (1995) and Big Sky (1997). Heidenreich was also the host of the children's game show Challenger until he left the show and Adrian de Vito & Zoe Sheridan co-hosted the show together.

From 1993 to 1996 and again since 2019, Heidenreich starred in a series of television commercials for Pizza Hut, as 'Dougie the Pizza Delivery Guy', which he still is commonly known as. Heidenreich had a leading role in Water Rats in 2000 and 2001 as Senior Constable Matthew Quinn. In 2003, he had a 4 episode guest role in McLeod's Daughters. He also appeared in the Carlton Draught 'Slo Motion' ads.

In 2009, Heidenreich starred in The Cut, and had a guest role in Packed to the Rafters. In 2010 he starred in the TV crime drama Underbelly: The Golden Mile.

In 2015, he guest-starred in Home and Away, as inmate Trevor Gunson, nemesis of fellow prisoner Darryl Braxton.

== Personal life ==
Heidenreich was arrested and served periodic detention for an incident involving a car crash and drug use, leaving his girlfriend in hospital in 1996.

He married journalist Genevieve Quigley in 2003. The couple has two children: daughter Ivory born in 2005, and son Jasper born in 2007.

Heidenreich joined Melbourne thrash stoner slow dance band Pizza Death in 2025 November as the rhythm guitarist and is occasionally a florist.

Heidenreich’s sister Siobhann is a member of the 1992 girl pop group [[Girlfriend]].
