= Erika Heynatz =

Australian actress (born 1975)

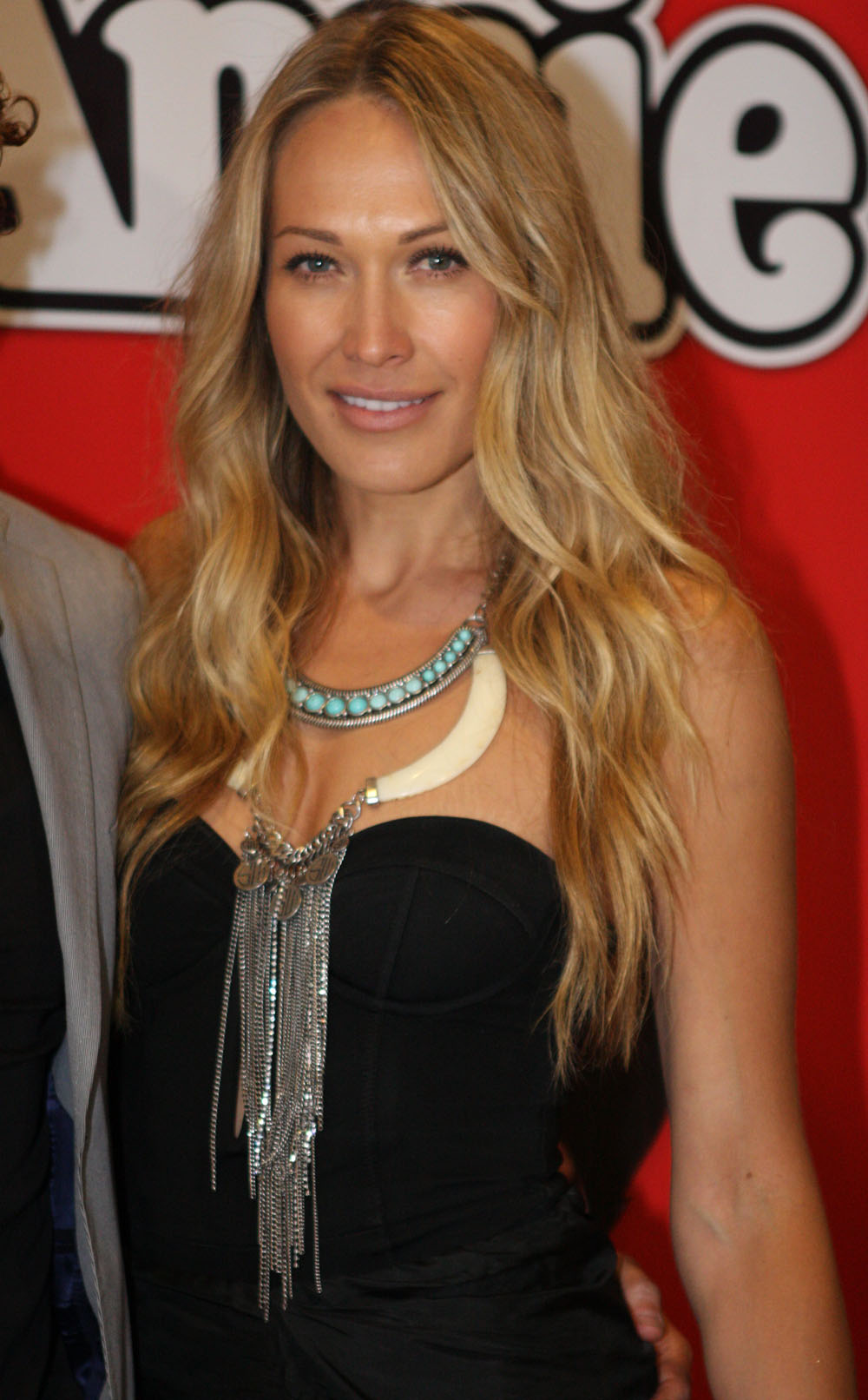
- Heynatz in 2012
- Born: 25 March 1975 (age 51); Port Moresby, Territory of Papua New Guinea
- Occupations: Singer, actress, model, television personality
- Years active: 2000–present
- Spouse: Andrew Kingston (m. 2007)
- Children: 1
- Musical career
- Genre: Pop: Pop rock
- Label: EMI Music

Erika Heynatz (born 25 March 1975) is an Australian model, actress, singer, and television personality. She joined long-running Australian TV series Home and Away in June 2015, as villainous biology teacher Charlotte King.

== Career ==
Heynatz hosted the first two cycles of the Foxtel reality TV show Australia's Next Top Model and the only season of the Ten Network's The Hot House. She demonstrated a commitment to a singing career by leaving her Australia's Next Top Model job, which went to Australian lads mag girl Jodhi Meares. Heynatz left Australia's Next Top Model to pursue her singing and her commitment to appear on the Seven Network's celebrity singing contest It Takes Two in 2006. Paired with David Hobson as her tutor, she eventually won the contest.

In 2003, she starred in the television movie Mermaids, and has since appeared in numerous other feature film roles. She also appeared as a guest star in the sci-fi series Farscape in the episodes "Terra Firma" and "Unrealized Reality". In 2007, Heynatz starred in the motion picture Gabriel.

Heynatz has starred in an Olay commercial and was the co-host of the third series of It Takes Two. She was a special guest judge during Cycle 8 of America's Next Top Model where one of the episodes was filmed in Sydney.

On 15 April 2008, Heynatz performed a cover of the Rosi Golan song "Slide" on It Takes Two and impressed the critics with the performance.

Heynatz had a recording contract with EMI Music Australia. Her debut single, "Kingdom", was released on 12 February 2010. The video for the clip was filmed in the US. Her second single, "Bullet", was released on 18 June 2010. Her debut album, Sweeter Side, was released on 16 July 2010, which contains the singles "Kingdom" and "Bullet".

Heynatz appears in Rockstar Games' L.A. Noire, as Elsa Lichtmann, which is produced using advanced motion capture technology. Although her character performs several 1940s-style songs in the game, synth-pop singer Claudia Brücken performed the vocals.

In 2013, she appeared in the musical Legally Blonde as Brooke Wyndham. Also in 2014, she starred as the Usherette and Magenta in the Australian tour of The Rocky Horror Show.

In 2015, it was announced that Heynatz had joined Seven Network soap opera Home and Away in a recurring role as school teacher Charlotte King.

== Personal life ==
Heynatz's grandfather immigrated to Australia at the age of fourteen and a half from Denmark.

On 8 March 2007, she married long-term partner Andrew Kingston.

== Filmography ==
=== Film ===
| Year | Title | Role | Notes |
|---|---|---|---|
| 2003 | George of the Jungle 2 | Kowalski | Video |
| 2006 | Voodoo Lagoon | Penny | |
| 2007 | Gabriel | Lilith | |
| 2020 | Children of the Corn | June Willis | |
| 2026 | Spa Weekend | Shanti | |

=== Television ===
| Year | Title | Role | Notes |
|---|---|---|---|
| 2001 | Head Start | Guest | "New Beginnings" |
| 2001 | Crash Palace | Katrina | "1.17" |
| 2002 | Heroes' Mountain | Nicola | TV film |
| 2002–03 | Farscape | Caroline Wallace | "Unrealized Reality", "Terra Firma" |
| 2003 | Mermaids | Diana | TV film |
| 2005–2006 | Australia's Next Top Model | Herself (host) | |
| 2007 | America's Next Top Model (cycle 8) | Herself (guest judge) | |
| 2015–16 | Home and Away | Charlotte King | Recurring role |
| 2017–19 | The Family Law | Diane | Recurring role |

=== Video Games ===
| Year | Title | Role | Notes |
|---|---|---|---|
| 2011 | L.A. Noire | Elsa Lichtmann (voice & motion capture) | Video game |
