= Chris Harrington (Home and Away) =

- Home and Away character
- Portrayed by: Johnny Ruffo
- Duration: 2013–2016
- First appearance: 1 April 2013
- Last appearance: 22 September 2016
- Introduced by: Lucy Addario
In-universe information
- Occupation: Waiter; Lifeguard
- Father: Ian Harrington
- Brothers: Spencer Harrington

Christopher Eugene "Chris" Harrington is a fictional character from the Australian soap opera Home and Away, played by Johnny Ruffo. The character made his first screen appearance on 1 April 2013. He was introduced as the brother of Spencer Harrington (Andrew Morley). Ruffo was a well-known professional singer and had previously auditioned for two other roles in the show. He was initially a guest character, but Ruffo was later promoted to the regular cast. With some personality traits resembling his own, Ruffo believed the character was especially written for him. Chris is characterised as a "cheeky" traveler who comes from a wealthy family. He is not academically gifted and prefers to spend his time trying to impress the show's female characters. Ruffo requested that writers make his character "more in-depth" so he could show his emotional range. Producers also introduced a comedic pairing with long-running character Irene Roberts (Lynne McGranger).

His first relationship storyline revolves around Indi Walker (Samara Weaving) and they face relationship problems because of her ex-partner's terminal illness and the arrival of Chris' ex-girlfriend Robyn Sullivan (Alexandra Park). He later goes on to share a romance with Denny Miller (Jessica Grace Smith), which writers developed into a "love-triangle" plot and resulted in Denny choosing to be with Casey Braxton (Lincoln Younes). Another romantic entanglement was devised for the character when he was coupled with Hannah Wilson (Cassie Howarth). Other storylines include Chris' need to look after his brother Spencer. Despite Chris' attempts to help, Spencer causes a rift between them. The show also highlighted the dangers of eating wild mushrooms which resulted in Chris accidentally poisoning two fellow characters. In 2014, Ruffo's contribution to the show was recognised with a Logie Award for Most Popular New Talent nomination. On 27 April 2016, it was announced Ruffo was to leave Home and Away and Chris made his final appearance on 22 September 2016.

== Casting ==
The character and Ruffo's casting was announced on 19 October 2012. Ruffo told Christine Sams of The Sydney Morning Herald that he had asked his agent to check out what roles were available, when the Home and Away part came up. Ruffo had already auditioned for two separate characters but was unsuccessful. After his first audition for Chris, he received a callback for a second audition. Ruffo called himself "very fortunate" after learning he had won the role because quite a few people also tried out for it. Home and Away marked Ruffo's acting debut and he relocated from Perth to Sydney for filming. He was initially contracted to appear in about sixteen episodes and he began shooting his first scenes in September. Ruffo's contract was later extended. Of his casting, Ruffo stated "I'm thrilled to be joining Home and Away. The cast and crew have made me feel so welcome and can't wait for everyone to meet my character Chris next year." The character's first episode was broadcast 1 April 2013. While contracted to home and Away, Ruffo continued to work on his music career and remained signed to a major record label.

== Development ==
=== Characterisation and introduction ===
For almost ten years of his life, Chris was an only child, and all of his parents’ hopes and dreams were pinned on him. It was expected that he would follow in his father’s footsteps and become a doctor. Unfortunately, Chris was in no way academic, driven, or even responsible, causing him to be at constant loggerheads with his father. But then Chris received the answer to his prayers – the arrival of a baby brother, Spencer.

— An excerpt taken from The Official Home and Away website revealing Chris' background.

Chris is Spencer Harrington's (Andrew Morley) older brother. He comes to Summer Bay to visit Spencer and convince him to return home and sort things out with his family. He also causes trouble and disrupts Spencer's relationship with Maddy Osborne (Kassandra Clementi). Ruffo thought that the scriptwriters had written the character just for him and he described Chris as being "fun and cheeky, he's a bit of a ladies' man and a little bit cheesy like me. He's a traveller who has been around, much like myself." The actor also called him "a lover, not a fighter" and added that he likes to stir the pot. Sams wrote that Chris would become the "focal point" of a romantic storyline and some family dramas.

Chris is from a rich family and enjoys the perks that it brings. He does not like responsibility and is not characterised as being intelligent. Following his brother's birth, he was happy that his parents focused all their attention on Spencer being the successful sibling. Chris prefers trying to impress females, of this Ruffo said "he's a fun guy, he likes the ladies and he's confident." As Chris was initially a guest character his he was a "pretty straightforward, open character". Writers expanded the role when Ruffo became a more prominent cast member. Chris' personality was made "more in-depth" following a request made by Ruffo, at the time he stated, "I wanted to show a lot more emotion. That challenges me."

Producers decided to have Ruffo working closely with Lynne McGranger who plays Irene Roberts and form a comedy partnership. Irene takes Chris into her home as a lodger and then gives him a job. Ruffo said that "Chris lives with Irene, he works with Irene in the diner and they have this ‘mother/son’ relationship and its a lot of fun to work with her. She is always telling me off." McGranger also enjoyed the on-screen partnership and branded Ruffo one of her favourite cast members to work with. McGranger told Daniel Kilkelly from Digital Spy that the two characters share "good comedy scenes" and she "loved" working on the relationship.

=== Relationship with Indi Walker ===
The character's first relationship storyline is with Indi Walker (Samara Weaving). Chris tries to romance Indi following her terminally ill husband's (Romeo Smith played by Luke Mitchell) departure. Following a short-time away from Summer Bay (due to Ruffo's break in filming) Chris returns and declares that he wants to be with Indi. Ruffo told Jessica Grubb from TV Week that Chris is at first hesitant to tell Indi how he feels. But he does tell her that he really cares about her. He described Indi's reluctance to move on from Romeo as "a bit of a battle" for Chris, but believed the timing was good because she was at least ready to "have her mind taken off things". Chris does face oppostition from Indi's sister Sasha Bezmel (Demi Harman) who dislikes him and thinks that Indi is too vulnerable for a new relationship. Chris decides that he needs to impress Indi and arrives at her home with a horse-drawn-carriage to transport them to a romantic meal. Ruffo defended his character's grand gestures and stated "Chris is trying to impress Indi as much as he can" and believes this to be the solution. Indi is "bemused" by Chris' actions but decides to accompany him to dinner. She sees a "softer side" to Chris and "warms to him a bit more" as a result. Sasha continues to bemoan Chris' presence but Indi's brother Dexter Walker (Charles Cottier) offers his approval.

Their relationship becomes complicated with the arrival of Chris' ex-girlfriend Robyn Sullivan (Alexandra Park). Indi had decided to move on following her realisation that Romeo would have wanted her to be happy. Ruffo believed that his character's outlook on relationships had changed via his involvement with Indi. He said that "Indi's made Chris realise there's more to girls than just one-night-stands. She definitely changed the way he thinks." Chris also learns that making a connection with another takes commitment so the pair reach a decision to make their relationship official. But soon after Robyn arrives and "throws a spanner in the works". Ruffo explained that Chris fears his relationship with Indi will be ruined by Robyn's arrival. The pair had not been together for long and Robyn causing issues makes him question their future. Robyn wants Chris back and makes her intention known. He is keen to see her leave Summer Bay, but Indi witnesses this and misinterprets it to be an intimate moment. Indi is upset and presumes it is evidence that Chris is cheating on her. He decides to keep Robyn's declaration a secret, but Indi questions him. Ruffo said “the worst thing is that Chris lies to Indi which causes trouble for their relationship”.

The show created more problems for the duo in the lead up to Samara Weaving's departure. Indi receives news that Romeo has died and this leaves her devastated. Ruffo said that while "Chris and Indi are a good couple", she has unresolved personal issues surrounding Romeo's illness and death. Ruffo added that it prevented Indi from being fully invested in his character. Indi pushes Chris away, but the actor stressed Chris tries his best to support her. But Indi's behavior continues and Chris is hurt by her actions because he believed they had overcome their problems. Romeo's presence in their relationship was constant through the storyline. Ruffo believed his character often feels inadequate because of Romeo, that "he isn't good enough for Indi". The events lead Indi to question her life and she decides that she needs a fresh start travelling. Chris is "stunned" by her decision but he tells Irene he is leaving with "the love of his life" Indi informs him that their relationship has come to an end and she will leave without him. Weaving believed that it was "done in a healthy way" and she was not running away from Chris.

=== Helping Spencer ===
One of Chris' recurrent roles has been to help his brother Spencer through his many personal problems. But there is also much confrontation between the two as Spencer feels that Chris is interfering in his life. One such episodic block featured Chris trying to be an advisor in Spencer's relationship issues with Maddy, but ends up causing more trouble. Spencer has Bipolar disorder and take medication to control the symptoms. Spencer later begins a relationship with Sasha and decides to stop taking his medication in order to regain control. Chris is "understandably alarmed" by Spencer's actions and questions him. Morley said that his character is annoyed with Chris and orders him to stop interfering. He added that "Chris knows how bad Spencer can become" with his bipolar disorder. But Chris tries to mask his concerns because of "family pride". Indi is Sasha's sister so is also drawn into the storyline over her fears for Sasha's wellbeing while with Spencer. Morley explained that Chris is in an "awkward position" because he wants to remain loyal to his brother but also offer reassurance to his girlfriend too.

Spencer's behaviour becomes more erratic and Chris tries to intervene. Morely said (in a TV Week interview) that "he takes what Chris says as an attack and his brother trying to control his life." Spencer then punches Chris, he becomes angry and just wants to take it out on Chris. Morely described it as a "heart-breaking situation" of someone turning on their own brother. But his anger causes him to pass out and Chris is left fearing for his younger brother's life. Chris becomes even more concerned when Spencer joins a cult at "Sanctuary Lodge" to help him control his disorder. Chris decides to attempt to help his brother again. Chris does not want Spencer to be brainwashed and visits him at the lodge. But Chris is rude to the cult leader, Morley said that Spencer is ashamed of Chris and he again turns violent towards his sibling.

Chris and Spencer learn that their father has been badly injured in a car accident. Ruffo described it as "not the greatest news, he is his brother so they deal with it together and have decisions to make, it is going to be tough for them." Spencer decides to go visit his father following the accident. But Spencer decides to leave Summer Bay after re-evaluating his life, following Morley being written out of Home and Away, leaving Chris without any on-screen family.

=== Mushroom poisonings ===
Producers decided to highlight the danger of misidentification of non-edible poisonous mushrooms. Chris was at the center of the storyline after he picks wild mushrooms as ingredients for a risotto. Chris is unaware that he has picked out death cap mushrooms, which are usually fatal if consumed. Two characters, Alf Stewart (Ray Meagher) and Leah Patterson-Baker (Ada Nicodemou) eat Chris' risotto and succumb to mushroom poisoning. Leah is first to gain symptoms and collapses in her home leading to her hospitalisation. Chris accompanies Alf on a boat ride when the engine fails. Then Alf's symptoms begin to surface and Chris rushes to save his life. But with his mobile telephone not working he is forced to load Alf into a dinghy to try and reach the shore, while Alf's condition deteriorates. Ruffo said that his character has to act fast and added "Chris is feeling incredibly guilty. He can't stop beating himself up about it."

Alf begins to recover following treatment but Leah goes into liver failure and experiences bleeding. Chris is "guilt-racked" by what he has done. He organises a community meeting to inform locals of Leah's condition and to appeal for a liver donor. Chris' actions draw in a number of people wanting to be tested. Nicodemou told a TV Week reporter that Leah is "overwhelmed" at the support she receives because of Chris' actions. The actress also told Susan Hill from the Daily Star that fellow victim Alf decides put himself forward as her liver donor.

=== Relationship with Denny Miller ===
Writers developed a new romance for Chris in 2014. Chris feels an attraction to Denny Miller (Jessica Grace Smith) and tries to convince her to date him. But he faces competition from Casey Braxton (Lincoln Younes) who writers also wrote into Chris' storyline. Ruffo told a reporter from stuff.co.nz that "Chris is definitely falling for Denny but in the back of his mind there's this shadow of doubt about Casey." Casey is a River Boy and has a reputation as being "strong and buff", and Chris feels threatened by him because Casey's "bad-boy attitude" could appeal to Denny. Chris behaves in an over-confident manner and his attempts to impress Denny go "spectacularly wrong" despite believing she will fall for him. Ruffo defended his character's misfortune with Denny stating "I think Chris thinks he's a lot more adorable than what he is sometimes, he's that happy-go-lucky kind of guy who sometimes opens his mouth and says things he thinks are going to help but instead brings things back a few pegs." Chris eventually manages to gain Denny's attentions and she confesses her love. But Chris is hesitant to accept her change of mind. Smith told Rebecca Lake (TV Week) that Chris "has the typical man reaction and starts freaking out." But Denny is a "straight-up" type of character and order Chris to decide what he wants.

Writers continued to involve Casey in their relationship forming a "love-triangle" plot. As a TV Soap writer observed that Denny and Casey's "undeniable" chemistry "was plain to see" and Chris had his "fair share of bumpy patches" with Denny. The development occurs when Chris decides he wants his relationship with Denny to be serious. She has doubts because of her growing feelings for Casey. Younes told Lake that Casey does not want to steal another man's girlfriend and distances himself from Denny. But when Denny cancels her gym membership to avoid Casey he decides he must make his feelings known and kisses her. Denny begins avoiding Chris due to her guilt. Smith told Shannon Molloy from TV Week that her character feels bad and is unsure of how to let Chris know about the kiss. She added "when he finds out, he's pretty upset" and he punches Casey in the face. Tired of Denny's confusion Chris dumps her, she tries to save their relationship but he realises that she wants to stay with him out of guilt.

=== Relationship with Hannah Wilson ===
In 2015, writers devised a new relationship for Chris with Hannah Wilson (Cassie Howarth). The pair become better acquainted when they work together on a fund-raising event. Irene suggests that the two should form a relationship, but Hannah does not take her advice seriously. Howarth told a TV Week reporter that Hannah only views Chris as a friend and had not thought romance was a possibility. When Chris' ex-girlfriend Ivana Frost (Tegan Martin) pays a visit to Summer Bay, he decides he must prove he has been successful and moved on. Chris convinces Hannah to pose as his girlfriend but Ivana does not believe them. They fake a kiss to fool Ivana's suspicions. Howarth commented that her character thinks she is helping Chris because "Hannah loves hanging out with Chris. She thinks he is really funny and he is a breath of fresh air." The duo later succumb to their feelings and begin a relationship. But writers soon added problems playing Hannah trying to keep the romance a secret. Chris eventually threatens to leave Hannah and she publicly confirms their relationship to other characters. Writers later reintroduced Hannah's ex-boyfriend Andy Barrett (Tai Hara) into the story to form a love triangle. Howarth said that her character would try to "right her wrongs" in 2016. Hannah wants "a fresh start" and make it work. But by episodes airing in February 2016, Hannah succumbs to Andy's advances while still with Chris. Hara told Downie that Andy has always loved Hannah, been through a lot with her and it marked the first time she reciprocates and is unfaithful to Chris.

=== Departure ===
On 27 April 2016, Channel 7 announced through Twitter that Ruffo had left Home and Away to pursue new challenges. Ruffo stated, "I've loved my time in Summer Bay. There's a lot more coming up for Chris and I hope fans continue enjoying his time on screen."

== Reception ==
For his portrayal of Chris, Ruffo was nominated in the category of "Most Popular New Talent" at the 2014 Logie Awards. Tom Williams of The Daily Edition said that Ruffo was "stealing the show as the trouble-making, heart-breaking Chris". While his co-presenter Monique Wright observed the character as having "a lot of tough times and unrequited love". A writer from stuff.co.nz branded the character a "likeable clown". A TV Week reporter noted that there appeared to be a rivalary between the Harrington brothers, adding "there hasn't been much brotherly love between Chris and Spencer." Mark James Lowe from All About Soap said that he loved the character and branded him an "unsung hero". Watching Chris grieve for Hannah upset the critic and his co-workers. Lowe added that the character had been "a great addition to Irene’s harem of waifs and strays, with his cheeky demeanour and caring attitude."
