= Oscar MacGuire =

- Home and Away character
- Portrayed by: Jake Speer
- Duration: 2013–2016
- First appearance: 3 September 2013
- Last appearance: 5 May 2016
- Introduced by: Lucy Addario
In-universe information
- Occupation: Student
- Father: Ethan MacGuire
- Mother: Sarah MacGuire
- Sisters: Evelyn MacGuire
- Half-sisters: Denny Miller
- Uncles: Zac MacGuire
- Aunts: Hannah Wilson

Oscar MacGuire is a fictional character from the Australian soap opera Home and Away, played by Jake Speer. The actor was cast in the role after a successful audition and a callback, in which he acted alongside various actresses to find the right one to play Oscar's sister. He began filming his first scenes in April 2013. Speer expressed his surprise at being cast in Home and Away, as he did not think he had "the right look" for the show. He made his first screen appearance during the episode broadcast on 3 September 2013.

Oscar was introduced to the show along with his twin sister Evelyn (Philippa Northeast) and their aunt Hannah Wilson (Cassie Howarth), creating a family for established character Zac MacGuire (Charlie Clausen). Oscar is portrayed as being a quiet, funny, headstrong teenager. He and his sister entered the show as part of an unusual storyline focusing on a cult. The twins were forced to join the cult by their father Ethan (Matt Minto), which made Oscar uncomfortable and left him struggling to "maintain his individuality". Oscar and Evelyn's early storylines focused on their escape from the cult and Ethan's attempts to get them back.

A few months after settling into Summer Bay, Oscar struck Tamara Kingsley (Kelly Paterniti) with a car, leading to his arrest. He was later depicted suffering a panic attack as he struggled with his guilt. Shortly after, the character was at the centre of an issue-led storyline focusing on body image and fitness obsession. Speer hoped the storyline would show younger viewers the dangers of becoming obsessed with being healthy. Oscar's first love interest was his friend Maddy Osborne (Kassandra Clementi). Following a one-night stand in 2014, Oscar and Maddy began a relationship the following year, as he supported her through a cancer diagnosis. Oscar was fatally injured during an explosion at the Caravan Park, and his last scenes aired on 5 May 2016.

== Casting ==
On 25 August 2013, it was announced that Jake Speer had joined the cast of Home and Away. Speer was cast as Oscar MacGuire, one of three new characters introduced to the show as relations of Zac MacGuire (Charlie Clausen). Speer successfully auditioned for the role of Oscar and he called the process "unique", as he was paired with various actresses during his callback to find the one with the right chemistry to play Oscar's sister. Speer began filming his first scenes in April. Of his casting, he said "It's pretty incredible now that I'm able to talk about it ... obviously my close friends and family knew. I've been on the show since April ... I didn't really know what to expect to start off with, but it's been fantastic." Before the part of Oscar became available, Speer did not think he would be cast in a show like Home and Away, as he believed that he did not have "the right look". The actor also admitted to being "very stiff" during his first day on set, as he was not used to the pace of filming. Speer made his first appearance as Oscar on 3 September 2013.

== Development ==
=== Characterisation and family ===
Oscar is a lively teen with a headstrong attitude and a genuine love of life. He's academically gifted and can find the humour in most things… which has enabled him to get through some tough times in a family that operates under a constant black cloud after the death of his mother.

— An excerpt from Oscar's profile on the official Home and Away website.

Speer said that Oscar had not seen much of the world, meaning he had missed out on having a normal teenage life. He described his character as quiet and living "under the radar". He does not like to make a fuss, but is funny, quirky and tries not to take life too seriously. Oscar was also described as being "an observer of people" on the official website. Speer enjoyed portraying his character and hoped that viewers would also like him once they got to know him well.

Oscar is the nephew of established character Zac MacGuire, who arrived in early 2013, and Hannah Wilson (Cassie Howarth). He has a twin sister Evelyn (Philippa Northeast). Speer explained that the twins were sixteen upon their introduction, but Evelyn liked to remind Oscar that she was older by two minutes. They had a strong bond and were each other's "safety nets". Oscar disliked it when Evelyn just dived into situations and often found her annoying. The official website stated that during their early school years, Evelyn and Oscar liked to escape to a world they created when they were young. They then became "a formidable united force in their teens." In the family's fictional backstory, the twins' mother, Sarah, died, leaving them to develop a deep bond with her sister Hannah. Speer said Hannah was like a second mother to the twins, which Evelyn did not like. Following their father's death, the twins met their half-sister Denny (Jessica Grace Smith).

=== Introduction ===
Oscar and Evelyn were introduced to the show as part of a cult storyline. Speer explained that it was "not your everyday run-of-the-mill thing" and he called the storyline "exciting". Zac visited the twins at a retreat that their father, Ethan (Matt Minto), had moved them to. Ethan initially tried to pass off the cult as a group enlightenment camp. Oscar was uncomfortable with his father's decision to move him and his sister into the cult's camp. He was aware that something was wrong and tried to "maintain his individuality and survive." Speer commented that Oscar was sceptical of the cult and found it strange, as he just wanted a normal teenage life. The cult forbade phones and computers, which was a disappointment to Oscar, who loved technology. Northeast noted that while Evelyn did what the cult asked of her, Oscar chose to rebel a bit more. When Zac finally realised the truth about the cult, he asked the Braxtons to help rescue Oscar and Evelyn. Zac was aware that the cult's lifestyle was not healthy for the twins and that neither of them were happy being there.

Actor Nic Westaway, who plays Kyle Braxton, commented that the Braxtons trusted Zac and if he said his brother was bad, then they would get the twins. Zac and the Braxtons had to fight their way out of the camp, but managed to rescue the twins and bring them to Summer Bay. A couple of months later, while the twins were attending a music festival, Ethan returned and kidnapped them, along with Kyle. Ethan locked them in a shipping container and Speer commented that it was "terrifying and confusing" for them all, as they wondered how long it would take for them to be released. Due to the warm weather, conditions inside the container quickly became worse as it turned into a sauna. Speer continued, "it's extremely hot, they're dehydrated and there's a lack of oxygen. All of them are starting to get groggy." Kyle tried to comfort the twins and Speer thought that they were lucky to have him there to keep them sane.

=== Hit-and-run accident ===
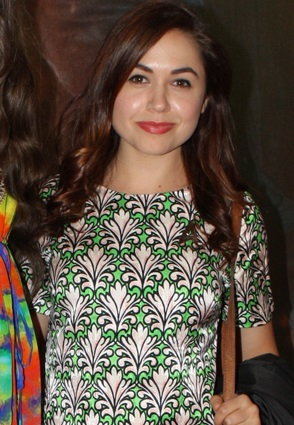
Oscar was arrested after hitting Tamara Kingsley, played by Kelly Paterniti (pictured), with Zac's car.

When Darcy Callahan (Alea O'Shea) went missing, Oscar joined the search party and soon found Zac passed out drunk at the wheel of his car. Trying to spare Zac further humiliation, Oscar decided to drive him home using the back roads around Summer Bay, despite not having his learner's permit. Speer said that as Oscar "always fights for the underdog", he could not leave Zac alone as he could potentially lose his job at the school. Speer continued, "Oscar sees an opportunity to take his 'man of the house' duties to the next level." As he was driving, Oscar became distracted by Zac, who began to wake up, and hit something in the road. He stopped the car and looked around, but could not see anything. Assuming he hit a branch or a kangaroo, Oscar carried on driving. However, it soon emerged that he had actually struck Tamara Kingsley (Kelly Paterniti), who had also been out looking for Darcy. Speer believed Oscar would be unable to forgive himself for hurting Tamara, calling it "a scary time for him". Following the accident, Oscar became torn about whether to confess. Evelyn begged him not to say anything as she did not want them to be separated.

When Zac noticed that the head lamp on his car was broken, he believed that he caused the crash. After Zac's confesses to the police, a "conscience-stricken" Oscar realised that he could no longer keep quiet and told Zac the truth. Despite his anger and guilt, Zac continued to cover for his nephew. But Oscar refused to let him "take the fall" and made a confession to the police, but they did not initially believe him. Oscar eventually made a statement and was formally charged. As he was fingerprinted and photographed for his mugshot, the enormity of what happened sunk in. Speer explained, "Oscar's been in denial for a long time. He never imagined himself as the kind of guy this could happen to. He's a good guy! But this is the first time he realises he could actually go to prison." Both Hannah and Zac felt that they had let Oscar down and the family started to turn against each other. Oscar struggled to cope with the gossip and ended up having a panic attack. He received help from Andy Barrett (Tai Hara), prompting Speer to comment "you find help in the strangest places!"

=== Fitness obsession ===
In August 2014, it was announced that Oscar would be the focus of an issue-led storyline focusing on body image and fitness obsession. Following the hit-and-run accident and his resulting community service, in which he was hazed by Mitch Todd (Matthew Pearce), Oscar began to self-destruct. He began skipping school to attend the gym as much as he could and developed "an unhealthy habit." It soon became an obsession and Oscar began punishing himself with exercise routines, which consisted of runs along the beach or intense work outs at the gym. His friends Spencer Harrington (Andrew Morley) and Maddy Osborne (Kassandra Clementi) tried to get through to him, but he pushed them away. Oscar then pushed himself to exhaustion during a run, causing him to fall to his knees. Of Oscar's obsession, Speer said "He's pursuing this idea of being healthy right to the max. But, the truth is quite the opposite. He does it until it becomes extremely unhealthy. It also becomes like self-punishment, in a way. He thinks he isn't good enough and isn't satisfied until he's pushing himself that little bit too far."

Oscar continued to push himself and ignored his body's warnings, like vomiting as he ran too much. When Hannah noticed his odd behaviour, she banned him from the gym. Oscar then sunk to a new low "to feed his addiction" and lied to her about asking Zac to pick him up from community service. Instead, he asked Mitch to give him a ride and drop him off outside of town, so he could run. Speer commented that Oscar did not know where he was, but he just wanted to keep going. However, his body soon began to shut down due to insufficient food and water. Oscar was left dazed and confused, before collapsing alone in the bush. When they realised what had happened, Hannah, Andy and Nate Cooper (Kyle Pryor) went out to find and help Oscar. Speer hoped Oscar's storyline would show younger viewers the potential danger of fitness obsession. He commented, "There is a lot of pressure on men to have a six-pack. And for Oscar, it becomes a little too much."

=== Relationship with Maddy Osborne ===
Oscar developed a crush on his friend Maddy and was "thrilled" when they had a one-night stand, following her break-up with Josh Barrett (Jackson Gallagher). Speaking to Inside Soap, Speer explained that Oscar wanted to be "a gentleman" and be supportive of Maddy, but he realised that this was his chance to be with her. He finally received the attention that he had always wanted from her. Oscar was blind to the fact that Maddy was using him to get back at his sister, who had begun dating Josh. When Evelyn and Spencer raised their concerns, Oscar refused to listen to them. Speer said, "He's blind. Things are finally working out for him, so he won't let others bring him down. He just tries to 'bloke' it out." When Oscar invited Maddy to his house, he ended up losing his virginity to her. Evelyn was infuriated when she discovered them the following morning. Speer admitted that Oscar did not plan it, he just wanted some time alone with Maddy, but he believed that it was the start of a proper relationship. However, Maddy confirmed that she had just used him to get back at Josh and Evelyn.

A couple of months later, Maddy learned that she was pregnant, but was unsure whether Oscar or Josh was the father of her baby. Maddy wanted the baby to be Josh's and initially refused to get an ultrasound, fearing it would confirm that Oscar was the father, someone she has never loved. After Oscar joked to her that he would be the baby's "fruncle", a portmanteau of friend and uncle, Maddy told him that the truth. When Oscar found out that she was also keeping the paternity issue from Josh, it became "too much for Oscar to handle" and he told Josh about it himself. Maddy later learned that she was not pregnant and actually had ovarian cancer. Oscar supported her with the diagnosis and accompanied her to the hospital, where she learned about her upcoming treatment. Maddy later shuts Oscar out after being informed that it would be difficult for her conceive in the future. While he left the room to find some food, Maddy ran away. After learning she was in the city, Oscar left to find her. Speer commented, "no-one knows where she is. It's a needle-in-the-haystack scenario." Oscar managed to find Maddy through her scrapbook, which was a bucket list of things she wanted to do before she dies, and convinced her to come home.

Stephen Downie of TV Week noted that Maddy and Oscar had developed "a seemingly unbreakable bond", while Clementi added that Oscar was the one that gets through to Maddy and their connection was unspoken. Oscar and Maddy embarked on a relationship, but during a date, as they were about to kiss, Maddy's nose began bleeding, serving as a reminder of her cancer. Oscar became worried that he was to blame for her latest health issue and Speer stated that all Maddy wanted to do was escape from the reality of her cancer, but found that there was no escape. Of Oscar's state of mind, Speer explained "finally he's having a relationship with Maddy. But, he's also dealing with some grown-up issues. The shadow of cancer is unavoidable." Oscar then went into "protective mode", but did not want to wrap her in cotton wool like other people. Oscar later had doubts about the relationship when it began to affect his studies. He was "afraid" to break-up with Maddy, but realising that he cannot hide his feelings, he told her that he wanted to end things.

=== Swept out to sea ===
When Oscar learnt his friend Matt Page (Alec Snow) had feelings for Maddy, his relationship with her began to suffer, as he was convinced she would leave him for Matt. Oscar later kissed another girl at a party and then told Maddy the truth. Speer called it a "classic Oscar moment" and said Maddy was "deeply hurt" by his actions. As Maddy ended the relationship, she ended up hurting him with some cutting remarks. Speer explained, "He's lost, and is left questioning not only Maddy and their relationship, but who he is as a person." Oscar headed to the beach and decided to go for a night swim. Speer told an Inside Soap columnist that he thought Oscar wanted to clear his head and maybe escape the world for a while. Oscar was then swept out to sea. When his belongings were found on the beach in the morning, his family became concerned for his safety, especially when they learned a storm was about to hit the Bay. Speer said the late night shoot in the ocean was "a little bit creepy" and he had to wear a wetsuit under his clothes to keep him warm.

An unconscious Oscar eventually washed up on a beach. He was found by Billie Ashford (Tessa de Josselin), who dragged him to a nearby shack and gave him fresh water. As he came round, Oscar was surprised to see Billie had rescued him and accused her of starting the fire that destroyed Leah Patterson-Baker's (Ada Nicodemou) house. Bille maintained her innocence and explained to Oscar that she had been living rough since leaving the town a few months prior. Billie then called the local police to tell them where Oscar was. He asked her to return to the Bay with him, but she quickly left. When the police arrived, Oscar told them that Billie had rescued him. He was soon reunited with his family.

=== Departure ===
"You invest so much time into creating what you think is a living, breathing version of a human being. And, then to have someone say an 18-year-old kid is going to die – it is very sad."

— Speer's reaction to Oscar's exit storyline.

During the episode broadcast on 5 May, scenes showed Oscar had suffered fatal injuries following an explosion at the Caravan Park. His aunt, Hannah, also died that same night after sustaining a serious head injury. Daniel Kilkelly of Digital Spy later confirmed that Speer had departed the show several months prior to Oscar's exit.

Speer said filming Oscar's death was not easy and he spent "a lot of cold wet nights" on his back. He also recalled that he had been joking about Oscar's exit, shortly before he was told Oscar would die and it turned into "a sombre moment." Speer told a TV Week columnist that seeing Evie losing her twin and her aunt during the same night was "really heartbreaking stuff." He also thanked fans for their support via his social media account after his last scenes aired.

== Reception ==
Ahead of Oscar and Evelyn's introduction, Jo Casamento from The Sydney Morning Herald stated "The River boys have calmed down, so Summer Bay is due for another shake-up, this time in the shape of teen twins Oscar and Evelyn." A TV Week columnist observed "since arriving in Summer Bay, Oscar (Jake Speer) has seen loads of drama, but not a whole lot of lovin'." Chelsea Anstee for OK! Australia branded the character "headstrong". A Sunday Mail observed that Oscar had become "smitten" with Maddy, but realised that "it's clear it's quite a one–way street and she's only using him to get back at Evelyn." When Maddy assured Oscar that she had genuine feelings for him in 2015, a contributor to the Evening Chronicle commented "Ahem, we're not convinced." Another Sunday Mail reporter branded Oscar and Maddy's relationship a "neverending will-they-or-won't-they saga". After Oscar and Maddy broke up, Sarah Ellis of Inside Soap felt sorry for the character, saying "Aw, poor Oscar! Although I'd have trouble choosing between him and Matt too..."
