= Matt Page =

Fictional character from the Australian soap opera "Home and Away"

- Home and Away character
- Portrayed by: Alec Snow
- Duration: 2013–2017
- First appearance: 21 October 2013
- Last appearance: 21 March 2017
- Introduced by: Lucy Addario
In-universe information
- Occupation: Student; Pizza delivery worker; Apprentice mechanic
- Father: Gray Page
- Sisters: Eloise Page
- Aunts: May

Matt Page is a fictional character from the Australian soap opera Home and Away, played by Alec Snow. The character made his first screen appearance on 21 October 2013. Snow won the role after auditioning in early 2013. Originally contracted for a three-month guest role, producers signed him permanently. Matt's backstory detailed him leading a tough life growing up in the Mangrove River area. He arrives to study at Summer Bay High following the school burning down. Matt is characterised as a troublemaker who lacks self-belief because of his upbringing. No one had ever given him the attention he needed to better his life. He also has a keen interest in music which is explored during his tenure. Initially bullying other characters, writers paired him romantically with Sasha Bezmel (Demi Harman) and provided a home for the character with Leah Patterson-Baker (Ada Nicodemou). Alongside these characters Matt is depicted on a journey trying to turn his life around.

His relationship with Sasha was developed with many problems. His father Gray Page (Craig Ball) was written into the series only for him to use and manipulate Matt. Snow has singled out the storyline for developing Matt into a more "three-dimensional" character. Sasha and Matt briefly became estranged while Gray was in the series, but the duo later reconciled. They continued try to make their relationship successful, but when Harman quit the series writers were tasked with separating them. Following her departure, Matt's dark-side was revisited which culminated in an ATM robbery, arrest and a storyline focused on alcoholism. Producers then lined up a controversial relationship story for the character. Matt has sex with Charlotte King (Erika Heynatz), who turns out to be his new biology teacher. The two decide to carry on their affair regardless. Snow has said the storyline helped his character finally mature. Matt's behaviour has drawn attention from various television critics. A writer from the South Wales Echo branded him a "troubled soul" and a Sunday Mail reporter suggested that Matt was incapable of making a sensible decision. The character made his final appearance on 21 March 2017, following Snow's decision to leave the show.

== Casting ==
Snow attended an audition for the character in early 2013 and won the part. He told Nick Houghton from The Toowoomba Chronicle that he was nervous ahead of the audition and did not expect to win the role. However, he received a call back the next day and won the part. He then went to Sydney to shoot his scenes. Snow was initially contracted for a three-month stint. Of his casting, Snow said "It is an absolute privilege to be on Home and Away. It truly is an iconic show and I am very proud to be a part of it." Snow later signed a contract to stay with the show for three-years. Snow called his character a "troubled kid", who does not where he fits in. The actor added "He is a bit confused about life and definitely ruffles people's feathers in the Bay." The character debuted on-screen during the episode airing on 21 October 2013.

== Development ==
=== Characterisation and introduction ===
"Matt Page hails from Mangrove River, and has therefore led a bit of a tough life. Growing up with a single Mum, no money, and an overwhelming feeling that ‘this is as good as it gets,’ it’s fair to say he has a bit of a chip on his shoulder. So when his local high school is burnt down in an arson attack, Matt approaches his transfer to Summer Bay High with some trepidation and a lot of attitude. He’s very much a fish out water in the ‘nicer’ school, but he’s been brought up to hide any hint of vulnerability or insecurity... where he comes from, it makes you look weak. And weakness just isn’t an option."

Having grown up in Mangrove River he has been conditioned to wide his vulnerable side because it is viewed as weak by other residents. He has developed a "screw you" mentality which makes him appear as a troublemaker. He is an intelligent character but has no time for school work and lacks self-belief that he can succeed. The show's official website reveals that in the character's backstory those around him never gave him the attention to try and better his life. They added that even if they did Matt would have rebelled because he is suspicious of those that claim to care about him. Matt had been hurt and disappointed by those closest to him and he learned to be defensive letting people get close to him. They concluded that "he operates very much on the philosophy that it’s better to never try, than run the risk of trying and failing." Snow described Matt as a "troubled kid from the wrong side" and he is unsure of where he fits into Summer Bay. He added "He is a bit confused about life and definitely ruffles people’s feathers in the Bay".

Matt is introduced into the series as a former pupil of Mangrove River High who comes to Summer Bay to study after his previous school burned down. Upon his arrival be misbehaves and expresses his dislike of his new classmates and teachers. Matt's other old classmates join in causing trouble at Summer Bay High and they argue about having to wear school uniform. He takes a dislike to Sasha Bezmel (Demi Harman) and begins to bully her. Harman told a TV Week reporter that "Matt is very mean to Sasha. To put it plainly, he is just a jerk and annoys everyone."

=== Music ===
Snow was a member of a band and he revealed that Matt also has a musical background which would be introduced on-screen. The storyline began when Matt was reluctant to perform in public and his friends become concerned. A reporter from TV Soap noted "music may be Matt's passion but he's still steadfastly refusing everyone's efforts to embrace his dreams." Kyle Braxton (Nic Westaway) tries to get Matt to perform at the Summer Bay High formal in the place of his girlfriend Phoebe Nicholson (Isabella Giovinazzo). Matt refuses Kyle's offer and Phoebe incorrectly assumes that Matt has performance anxiety. Her advice is not well received and Matt insists that he is not nervous about performing. Phoebe impulsively hosts a concert and invites Matt on stage to perform but he angrily exits the venue. When Sasha finds Matt he confesses that he cannot perform because his drive for a music career caused an incident which endangered the lives of his relatives. Matt also played a role in a high-profile cameo appearance from singer Ed Sheeran. When Matt sees the singer he convinces him to perform at Angelo's restaurant. Snow branded filming the scenes as an "awesome experience".

=== Relationship with Sasha Bezmel ===
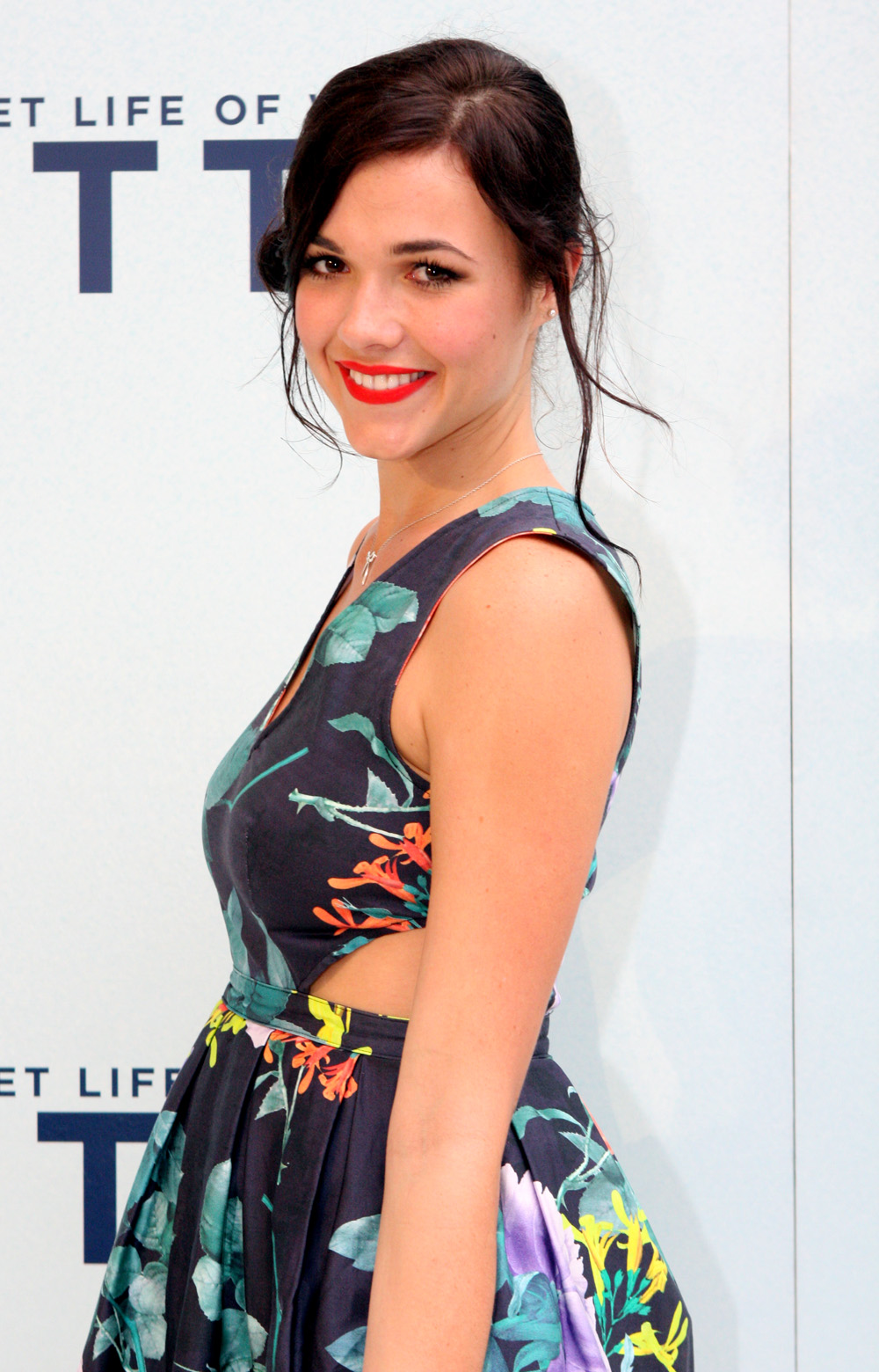
"Sasha and Matt are in love. They're supposed to be together, but life is really tearing them apart, which is really sad." — Demi Harman (pictured) speaking on Matt and Sasha's doomed relationship.

The show devised a relationship storyline for Matt with Sasha. The two characters were described in Australian magazine Woman's Day as "polar opposites from one another". The duo spend time together working on the school election campaign. Sasha was in a relationship with Spencer Harrington (Andrew J Morley) but he is preoccupied with family problems. Sasha helps Matt to write an election speech and he kisses her. Morley told Rebecca Lake of TV Week that "the kiss comes as a shock to Sasha but she doesn't push him away. Spencer's not at the forefront of her mind in that moment." The storyline also began a feud between Matt and Spencer, Morley added "he presses Spencer's buttons and tells him about the kiss." Matt's bragging causes Spencer to punch him and break-up with Sasha. They begin dating but Matt begins to feel insecure because he believes that he is not good enough for Sasha. He boasts about the intimate moments he shares with Sasha. When she discovers his betrayal Sasha is left hurt. Matt realises he may lose her and declares his love for her in the hope she will continue their relationship.

Snow told Stephen Downie of TV Week that he and Harman "worked hard to develop their character's relationship. He believed that Sasha's influence throughout their relationship has helped Matt to mature. He's gone from being a bully from Mangrove River to being a bit more grown up, which is nice." Snow added that Sasha tells Matt when he is being stupid which makes them get along better. Writers devised relationship problems between the two when they introduce Matt's father, Gray Page (Craig Ball). Gray is released from rehab and locates Matt and punches him in the face. He blames Matt for the breakdown of his family while he was away. Matt takes pity on his father and hires a caravan for him to stay in and buys him food. Sasha becomes concerned that Gray is manipulating Matt. Despite needing to study, Gray manages to lure Matt away to spend time with him. This prompts Sasha to voice her concerns but Matt accuses her of ruining his family. The argument causes the pair to become distant for a while as Gray continues to manipulate Matt. Snow labelled the introduction of his character's father as his favourite storyline of 2014. He explained that his involvement with Gray made Matt a more "three-dimensional" character. He added "you got to see where he's from. It gave an insight into what Matt's like." When their relationship recovers, it faces yet more problems. Matt goes for a late-night swim with Evelyn MacGuire (Philippa Northeast) which angers Sasha. A show publicist told Susan Hill of the Daily Star that Matt thinks Sasha is overreacting because the swim was innocent. They added "all they did was go for a swim. But Sasha thinks it was completely inappropriate."

Harman decided to leave the series to pursue other projects. The show devised an exit storyline for Sasha which meant that her relationship with Matt would come to an end. It begins when Sasha takes Matt away to the city but decides to check out universities. Snow told Downie (TV Week) that Matt does not want to know because he fears it will end their relationship. But fearing that Sasha will leave him anyway, he dumps her. Snow explained that "it's not like he's fallen out of love with her, but breaking up with Sasha is almost a self-sacrificing thing." As an Inside Soap columnist noted, "the strain of their long-distance love takes a heavy toll". Matt is then banned from Sasha's dorm room and she considers moving to a university closer to Summer Bay. Worried that she is about to ruin her career and future plans Matt decides to end their relationship. The pair agree to try to give their relationship another chance. But the distance begins to prove difficult, Harman stated that "It’s stressful on both of them. They can both see things are not as easy as they once were." Sasha and Matt decide to accept their relationship is over and she leaves to live at university. Off-screen Snow and Harman began a relationship together too and Harman told Colin Vickery of News.com.au that it was a case of life imitating art. Their relationship made it feel as though it was real and not acting when filming the character's goodbye scenes. Harman hoped that viewers could see the realism when watching the scenes. She added that leaving the show and moving to Melbourne away from Snow, just like Sasha did from Matt, which led to the characters separating had worried her in respect of her own romance. Harman believed that not many actors in the industry had been in their scenario. One which she defined as lovers acting out the break-down of a relationship but in reality remaining together. Snow described the final break-up scenes as "a real tear-jerker".

=== Drinking and robbery ===
Producer Lucy Addario revealed that the break-up proved a testing time for Matt and hinted he would return to his old ways. In the weeks that followed Matt's behaviour becomes increasingly self-destructive and he turns to crime. The development begins when Matt begins to drink heavy. He tries to kiss Evie who does not welcome his advances. Her boyfriend Josh Barrett (Jackson Gallagher) attacks Matt when he learns the truth. Leah Patterson-Baker (Ada Nicodemou) becomes concerned that Matt is drinking too much and has a problem. She had previously taken him into her home and helped him through his troubles. She finds Matt collapsed on the floor as a result of too much alcohol. She manages to save him but blames herself for not supporting him while she was in a coma.

Matt is involved in a robbery at an ATM in Mangrove River while he is out drinking alcohol. Police officer Katarina Chapman (Pia Miller) examines CCTV and identifies Matt as being on the scene. She brings Matt in for questioning over the incident and he claims he cannot remember anything because he was drunk at the time. Snow explained that his character thought he had gotten away with the crime. He even forgot about it himself but it is now "back to haunt him". Leah refuses to believe that Matt is guilty and accuses Kat of targeting Matt because of his past. But Leah finds a bundle of money hidden in Matt's mattress and is then convinced he is responsible. Matt feels ashamed of himself when Leah confronts him as he has let her down. Snow told Downie that "to let Leah down is a massive thing, he feels horrible about it." Leah is also suffering from an aneurysm and needs to rest. But the revelation causes her stress and Matt's drinking endangers Leah's life and his future.

=== Charlotte King ===
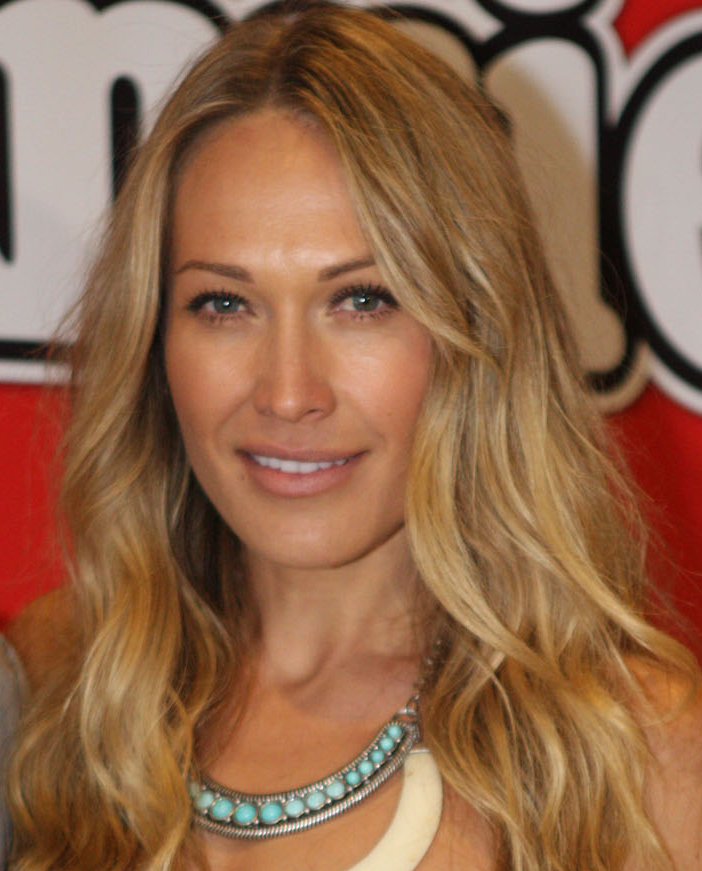
Erika Heynatz plays Charlotte King

In June 2015, Addario spoke of her intention to play a "rebound relationship" for Matt. But she warned that it would remain a secretive relationship because Matt believes other characters will not approve. Matt meets Charlotte King (Erika Heynatz) and they sleep together. Heynatz and Snow did not have time to get better acquainted before they filmed their character's first passionate encounter. Heynatz told Kerry Harvey from Stuff.co.nz that it worked well for the scene, which was a "sexy chance meeting, inherent with all its awkward moments." She added that a "lasting connection" develops between the two characters, but branded their relationship a dangerous one. Charlotte does not realise that he is a student and she has taken the role of Summer Bay High's new biology teacher. Despite learning this, the pair decide to carry on their affair. Matt confides in Maddy Osborne (Kassandra Clementi) about the relationship, she disapproves and urges him end it. Charlotte does try to stop it, but when Matt kisses her she succumbs to her feelings. Heynatz said that their initial interaction was an "innocent mistake", but her character would be judged by viewers for carrying on with their romance. Writers continued to keep the pair together as they played Leah, who was unbeknownst to their affair, convincing Charlotte to personally tutor Matt.

Snow said it was continuing the tradition of Matt getting into "sticky situations" as Charlotte turned out to be a "crazy" character. Snow told Downie that the storyline really interested him because it was often shown from Matt's point of view. He believed it furthered a trend in storyline's exploring why Matt behaves certain ways. Matt would often lack self-belief but with Charlotte he became confident. He branded the character "Char-nado" and added that Charlotte was always "using her womanly charms to put a spell on him". He believed that Matt's experiences with Charlotte helped the character to mature and drew comparisons to the Shakespearen play A Midsummer Night's Dream. Despite their relationship ending, Snow noted that his character "really doted on" Charlotte. Snow was 23 at the time while Heynatz was 40. Snow said that he had fun filming the storyline. He reflected that he tried to do the best job he could to make it appear truthful and justify their relationship.

=== Relationship with Maddy Osborne ===
In 2015, Producers lined up yet another relationship for the character. Matt develops feelings for Maddy, despite him going out with his good friend Oscar MacGuire (Jake Speer). Clementi told Downie that there are some "serious vibes" from Matt, but Maddy is oblivious to them. Matt has hope that he may have a chance with Maddy when she has a serious argument with Oscar. She added that Maddy and Oscar do not have "that spark" but are good together. Oscar enlists Matt to help sort his problems. Matt finds the situation difficult because he tries to remain calm when talking to Maddy about her relationship. But he wants to tell her how he feels and this makes him a "tangled mess of emotions". Speer told Downie that Matt and Oscar had formed "such a bizarre friendship". One that began with Matt bullying Oscar and ended in them being firm friends. But their friendship was ruined when they fight over the same girl.

The pair begin a relationship but writers devised a series of problems for the characters. Matt decides to drop out of university which angers Maddy. Then Matt is arrested in connection with Charlotte's murder. She leaked a sex tape of them online and the police wrongfully believe he killed her in an act of revenge. Matt is worried about how Maddy will react to the sex tape. Snow said that his character is "completely blindsided by it". Matt is criticised online by trolls and Maddy defends him. But following her supportive post, she becomes their target of the online bullying. But Maddy soon fears that she is being followed and harassed. Snow said that Matt feels guilty and blames himself for Maddy's situation. He added "if anyone should have to deal with this it's him". But Matt is furious when he reads certain comments and goes to the station to report the trolls. Snow praised the storyline because online bullying is a current issue many have to deal with.

=== Departure ===
After four years in the role, Snow's departure from Home and Away was confirmed in March 2017. Snow left the show on 21 March, along with Philippa Northeast, who plays Matt's love interest Evelyn MacGuire. Matt and Evelyn left Summer Bay for Vietnam, shortly after holding a ceremonial wedding. Snow admitted that he was "apprehensive" during his last day on set, but thought the ceremony, with Alf Stewart (Ray Meagher) as the celebrant, was the "perfect parting gift."

== Reception ==
A writer from TV Week said "There's no denying it. Home and Away's Sasha and Matt have more chemistry than a nuclear power plant. While their colleague Shannon Molloy branded him a "troubled teen" character and weighed up his time in the show, stating "he isn't taking much seriously at the moment. He's mucking up as a school captain, pushing the new Summer Bay High principal's buttons and treating his girlfriend like rubbish." A writer from TV Soap observed "having grown up in a poor household with a single mum, Matt's 'me against the world' attitude rubbed plenty of people the wrong way." Of his bad attitude they added "you could see the chip on his shoulder from a mile away." But they believed the character also had hidden depths concluding that "behind the tough, cocky exterior lies a decent young man who's had a pretty difficult life." TV Week's Stephen Downie insulted the character for not caring about his future, stating "what a turkey" he was behaving like towards Sasha.

A writer from the South Wales Echo said they were thankful that Matt decided to stop drinking and branded him a "troubled soul". A Sunday Mail reporter suggested that Matt was incapable of making a sensible decision. They noted that alls Matt needed to do was to cooperate with authorities to avoid jail time for robbery, but they were not holding their breath. Susan Hill (Daily Star) liked the character's appearance and branded him "hunky Matt".
