= Denny Miller (Home and Away) =

- Home and Away character
- Portrayed by: Jessica Grace Smith
- Duration: 2014–2015
- First appearance: 12 February 2014
- Last appearance: 1 October 2015
- Introduced by: Lucy Addario
In-universe information
- Occupation: Bait shop assistant
- Father: Ethan MacGuire
- Mother: Olivia Miller
- Half-brothers: Oscar MacGuire
- Half-sisters: Evelyn MacGuire
- Uncles: Zac MacGuire

Denny Miller is a fictional character from the Australian soap opera Home and Away, played by Jessica Grace Smith. The actress was a fan of the show prior to being cast. She originally auditioned for the role of Phoebe Nicholson, before she was offered the part of Denny in 2013, a week before she left for Los Angeles. She made her first screen appearance during the episode broadcast on 12 February 2014.

Denny was introduced as the long-lost daughter of Ethan MacGuire (Matt Minto). She was portrayed as a tough, honest, self-sufficient tomboy. Shortly after her arrival, Denny was at the centre of a love triangle involving Chris Harrington (Johnny Ruffo) and Casey Braxton (Lincoln Younes). Denny and Casey then embarked on a relationship, but it was cut short following his death. Denny initially struggled with her grief, and filming the scenes challenged Smith as an actress. Denny eventually moved on with Martin Ashford (George Mason). On 14 September 2015, the character was killed off and Smith believed viewers must have cared about her to get such a dramatic exit.

== Casting ==
On 28 January 2014, Daniel Kilkelly of Digital Spy announced that New Zealand actress Jessica Grace Smith had been cast as Denny. Smith had been a fan of Home and Away during her teenage years and wanted to appear on the show when she relocated to Australia. Smith originally auditioned for the role of Phoebe Nicholson, but Isabella Giovinazzo was cast instead. Having spent three years auditioning for parts, Smith planned to move to Los Angeles and was a week away from leaving when she was offered the role of Denny by the producers in late 2013. She commented, "It was crazy! My bags were almost packed for LA. I was so stoked to be a part of the show and have full time work. It's an actor's dream." Smith made her screen debut as Denny on 12 February 2014.

== Development ==
=== Characterisation and family ===
Denise, or Denny as she preferred to be called, has always been a bit of a tomboy. Since she could walk and talk, she’s thought of herself as a tough nut; refusing to play with dolls or wear anything girlie. Instead, she always saw herself as the man of the house. This could be because there was no other man around.

— An excerpt from Denny's profile on the official Home and Away website.

Ahead of her first appearance, Smith described Denny as an honest and "pretty straight up" character, who was "not your typical girl". The actress later said that Denny is a tomboy and very self-sufficient. Smith was pleased that Denny was also a tomboy like herself, saying "It's really nice sharing that with her. It means I don't have to wear too many of the high heels that I'm terrible at walking in." The actress later said that she would advise Denny "to let loose a little more" and relax, as she was always doing the right thing.

Denny arrived in Summer Bay on the day of Ethan MacGuire's (Matt Minto) funeral, attracting scepticism and worry from Ethan's sister-in-law Hannah Wilson (Cassie Howarth), who wondered if she was a member of the cult that Ethan had been involved in. Smith said viewers would be surprised by Denny's true identity and teased "it's a bit of a family thing." It later emerged that Denny was Ethan's daughter. In her fictional backstory, Denny was raised by her single mother, but longed to find her father. She had trouble finding him, until she learned of his death. At the funeral, Denny learned that she had half-siblings, Evelyn (Philippa Northeast) and Oscar MacGuire (Jake Speer), and she was keen to form a relationship with them.

After moving to Summer Bay, Denny found employment at the local bait shop run by town stalwart Alf Stewart (Ray Meagher), and developed a close working relationship with him. Smith explained that Denny saw Alf as a father figure, making it the first time she had had that type of relationship in her life. Denny liked that she could talk to Alf about life's issues and get a straight answer.

=== Love triangle ===
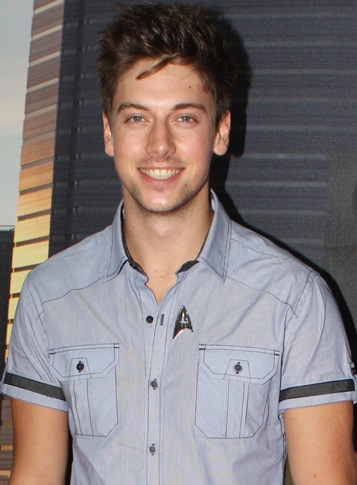
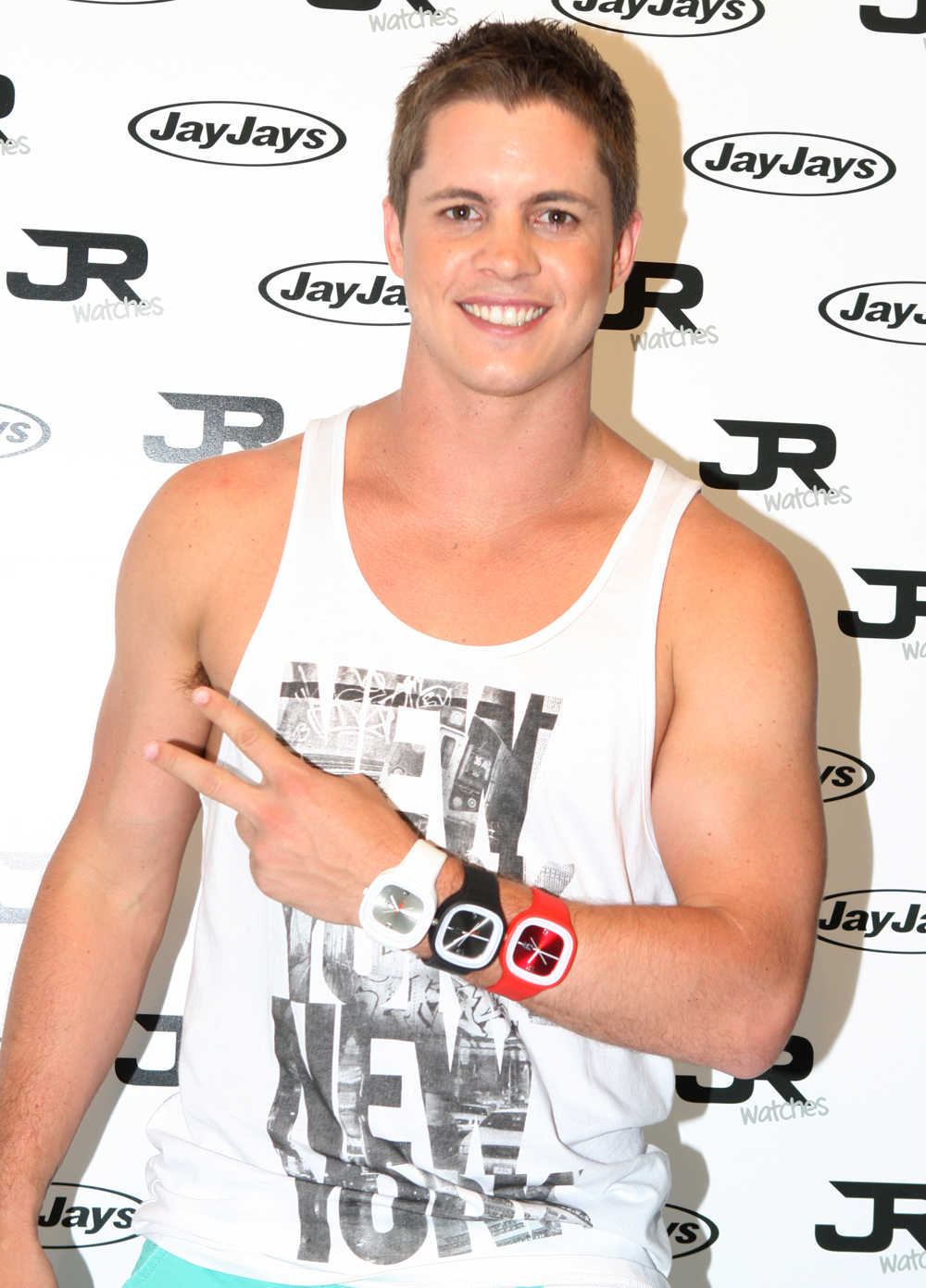
Lincoln Younes (left) and Johnny Ruffo (right) portray Denny's first love interests Casey Braxton and Chris Harrington.

A few months after Denny's introduction, she developed a romance with Chris Harrington (Johnny Ruffo). Smith commented that her character thought Chris was "really cute". When Denny tried to flirt with him, he was oblivious to her advances. But Irene Roberts (Lynne McGranger) noticed Denny's interest in Chris and told him to take her on a date, in exchange for adding his meal ideas to the Diner menu. Chris and Denny went on a boat ride and he enjoyed the date. However, when he accidentally revealed Irene's bribe, an angry Denny took off in the boat, leaving Chris stranded on the beach. Smith said Denny was upset with Chris because he was not honest and upfront with her. She told him to forget about the date, but Chris began pursuing her.

Weeks later, Denny tells Chris that she had fallen in love with him, but Chris did not react well and Smith noted that he "starts freaking out". Denny was not impressed and told him to come and find her when he had thought things through. While Denny was waiting for Chris, she developed a connection with Casey Braxton (Lincoln Younes). Smith told Rebecca Lake from TV Week, "Denny is a bit taken aback by Casey. She thinks he's so hot!" When Chris spotted them together, he was wary of their chemistry and questioned whether he had messed up his romance with Denny. Ruffo explained that Chris was "definitely falling for Denny", but he developed doubts about Casey and believed that he had competition for her.

Smith was aware that Denny would eventually have a love interest, and thought it was "cool" knowing that she had two men fighting over her, instead of having Denny and another female character fighting over one man. She commented, "I was like, 'This is great. I'll just sit back and they can fight it out'." Denny and Chris's romance suffered due to her growing feelings for Casey, and Chris's inability to make a decision about whether he was ready for an adult relationship. Casey had also fallen for Denny, despite her previously rejecting him. Denny cancelled her gym membership in an effort to avoid Casey, but Younes said that it just encouraged Casey to "man up" and take action. Denny and Casey then shared a kiss on the beach. Smith said it was out of character for Denny and she felt guilty, as she did not want to hurt Chris, but the kiss made her realise how she really felt about Casey. When asked which man she would choose, Smith replied "Definitely Casey! He's so funny, lovely, and sexy – and they've had a connection from the start."

Denny became conflicted about whom she wanted to be with and began avoiding Chris. She later admitted to him that she was confused as Casey also liked her. Chris then broke up with her and punched Casey. Denny asked Chris to take her back, but he refused as he knew that she only wanted to be with him out of guilt. Denny realised that Chris was right and thanked him for being brave enough to end their relationship when she could not. Denny then told Casey about her feelings for him and they began dating. Younes described their relationship as "honest" and said they really liked each other. He also hinted that she might be "the one" for Casey.

=== Relationship with Casey ===
Denny and Casey's relationship progressed and Smith commented, "Casey and Denny are really loved-up. It's nice. They kind of have had their ups and downs. And they still butt heads a lot and they still have these little fights. But now they are like, 'Oh, no, actually you're awesome.'" Smith branded the couple "cute" and thought they were a good match for each other. Denny and Casey's relationship was tested when Andy Barrett's (Tai Hara) drug troubles came between them. Casey kept getting in the middle of Andy's dramas, which annoyed Denny as she did not like Andy. When Denny questioned Casey about his involvement with Andy, it became a big issue between them. Chris also caused problems when he misread a moment with Denny and kissed her. Chris invited Denny to spend some time with him when he noticed that she seemed down. Denny spoke to Chris about her struggles with Casey and Andy's relationship. When she thanked Chris for listening to her, he kissed her and she threw him out.

Andy's involvement with drug dealers later led to Casey and Denny being held hostage. While they were at the gym, three men arrived and pinned Casey to some gym equipment. Smith explained that Denny was scared and finally realised how badly Andy had messed up. Denny managed to text Casey's brother Darryl Braxton (Stephen Peacocke), but the men left before he arrived. Denny continued to worry about the trouble Andy had brought to her relationship and her family, but she managed to put her worries aside to help with preparations for the a school formal. When she admitted to Casey that she had missed her own school formal, Casey organised a romantic dinner for them at Angelo's. Stephen Downie of TV Week noted that in that moment they both realised how much they meant to each other.

Weeks later, Casey was shot dead by Jake Pirovic (Fletcher Humphrys) while attempting to rescue Andy's brother Josh (Jackson Gallagher). When Casey learned that Josh had been taken by Jake and his men, he put his plans with Denny on hold to go after them. Casey reassured Denny that everything would be fine, but Denny was unconvinced and told Brax about the situation. While the brothers were arguing, Jake fired a gun through the window and killed Casey. After learning that Casey had died, Denny was consumed by grief and struggled to cope, resulting in her collapse after his funeral. When she admitted to Alf that she could not face going to Angelo's or the beach, he offered her support and told her that she was stronger than she thought. Smith said filming the "hard-hitting scenes" was challenging to her as an actress.

=== Relationship with Ash ===
A few months after Casey's death, Denny met Bay newcomer Martin "Ash" Ashford (George Mason) when he offered to help her fix her car. Ash was impressed by Denny's "feisty nature" when she turned him down. When Denny then saw Ash working at Angelo's, they started flirting. Brax then warned Ash off Denny, explaining that she had been Casey's girlfriend. When Ash later offered his condolences for Casey, Denny was "uncomfortable", but there was an obvious chemistry between them. Denny developed a crush on Ash, but she was reluctant to start a relationship with him as she was still grieving for Casey. Smith told an Inside Soap columnist, "It's the first time she's been attracted to someone since Casey died, so I think she's just trusting her instinct. But it's definitely not all smooth sailing." Denny received advice from John Palmer (Shane Withington) about moving on after the death of a partner. She then made the first move and kissed Ash, but he soon ran off leaving her confused by his reaction. Ash later organised a day of romance for them both, telling Denny that he wanted to spend the whole day and night with her. Denny was "a little nervous", but decided that she was ready to consummate their relationship. However, she felt odd about it afterwards.

=== Departure ===
In early September 2015, Denny was named as one of five potential murder victims for an upcoming storyline. Stephen Downie (TV Week) reported that one of the characters would be "brutally killed off". Downie speculated that Denny might have made herself a target after voicing her suspicions about newcomer James Edmunds (Myles Pollard), as well as learning that Brax was still alive. In the episode broadcast on 14 September, Denny died after suffering a head injury during a fight with Charlotte King (Erika Heynatz). Denny had been due to leave the Bay to go backpacking around Europe, but shortly before she left, she discovered Charlotte with a stolen safe from The Diner. As Denny and Charlotte fought over it, Denny hit her head and died instantly.

Smith did not mind being killed off, saying, "When I found out that was happening to my character I thought, 'Oh my God, they love me enough to kill me'. I thought, if you kill someone off, the public must really care about that character. Otherwise they would just send them off to university." She later admitted to being shocked to learn of her character's fate, but was happy to have that kind of closure, so she could move on to other roles. Smith thought it was fitting that Denny's death mirrored that of Casey's, and she added that as both characters were dead they could be together at last. Series producer Lucy Addario stated that Denny's "sudden and accidental death" would be the catalyst for Charlotte's downfall.

== Storylines ==
Denny attends the funeral of Ethan MacGuire. At the end of the service, his sister-in-law Hannah Wilson approaches Denny to ask who she is, but Denny is defensive and she leaves. Hannah later apologises and Denny tells her she is Ethan's daughter. Denny stays at the local caravan park and asks Hannah and Ethan's brother Zac (Charlie Clausen) if she can meet her half siblings Evelyn and Oscar. Zac finds a picture of Denny among Ethan's possessions, and she realises that Ethan knew she existed. The twins initially refuse to meet Denny, but Oscar changes his mind. Evelyn accuses Denny of lying, but when Denny plans to leave the Bay, she comes to talk to Denny and they bond. Denny eventually moves into The Farmhouse with her family, and she begins working at Alf Stewart's bait shop. Chris Harrington flirts with Denny and she agrees to go on a date with him. After a rocky start, Denny and Chris begin dating. However, Chris is shocked at the extent of Denny's feelings for him and they break up. Denny becomes attracted to Casey Braxton, but she reconciles with Chris when he admits he is ready to commit to her. Casey and Denny kiss and Chris breaks up with her. Denny then begins a relationship with Casey.

Denny develops a bitterness towards Andy Barrett when Hannah believes his drugs were Zac's, causing him to move out. Casey supports Andy through his troubles putting strain on their relationship. Chris asks Denny to spend time with him as friends, but he misreads the situation and kisses her. Andy is threatened by drug dealers, putting Denny and her family at risk. Cody Dalton (Aaron Glenane) and his men later threaten Casey and Denny at the gym. She manages to text Casey's brother Brax, but Cody catches her and attempts to hurt her. Cody and his men leave, but they later kidnap Evelyn and Josh Barrett. Denny and Evelyn try to help Casey and Josh bond after they learn they are half-brothers. When Denny tells Casey about missing her school formal, he organises a romantic dinner at Angelo's. Just as Denny and Casey are set to leave for a romantic getaway, Casey goes to help Andy rescue a kidnapped Josh. Kyle Braxton (Nic Westaway) later informs Denny that Casey is dead, after being shot. Denny attends his funeral alone and later collapses from dehydration. She continues to struggle with her grief and tries to avoid going to Angelo's and beach. Brax gives Denny an engagement ring that he found in Casey's bag.

Denny supports her siblings and friends through their problems, and accompanies Sasha Bezmel (Demi Harman) on a university open day. When Andy asks her about Hannah, Denny tells him that she is not interested in him anymore. Hannah berates her for lying to Andy and Denny reminds her of everything Andy had done to their family. Denny meets Martin "Ash" Ashford and is attracted to him. Despite warning Ash off, Brax tells Denny to move on when she is ready. Denny decides to join a coach party going to Phoebe Nicholson's (Isabella Giovinazzo) record launch in the city. The coach crashes, but Denny is not injured. Denny feels ready to move on with Ash and kisses him. They begin dating, but Denny breaks up with Ash when she learns that he lied to her about going after Kyle, who was carrying out a drugs deal. After speaking with Ash's sister Billie (Tessa De Josselin), Denny gives her relationship with Ash a second chance. A few weeks later, Ash breaks up with Denny in order to protect her, after agreeing to help Brax escape jail. Denny ask Ash to consider a casual relationship, but is hurt when she sees him and Phoebe kissing. The girls put their differences aside when Phoebe moves into the Farmhouse, along with Katarina Chapman (Pia Miller).

Denny discovers a note meant for Ricky and learns that Brax is still alive, following his apparent death during a failed prison escape. Denny confronts Ash and is determined to tell Ricky, but she later changes her mind. Denny is introduced to James Edmunds and believes she has met him before. She later realises that she saw him at the university open day with his daughter. James tells her she is mistaken and the girl was a friend's daughter. Shortly after the first anniversary of Casey's death, Denny decides to travel around Europe like they had planned. Kat initially agrees to go with her, but later changes her mind. On her last day in the Bay, Denny says goodbye to her family and friends. She stops by Charlotte King's flat to ask her cousin Hunter (Scott Lee) if he was interested in taking over her job at the bait shop. Denny notices the stolen safe from the Diner and she and Charlotte fight over it. Charlotte pushes Denny, causing her to fall back and hit her head against the corner of an armchair, killing her instantly. Charlotte later buries Denny's body in the bush and her guilt causes her to see visions of Denny. A couple of months later, backpackers find Denny's body and her funeral is held in the city weeks later.

== Reception ==
Following Denny's arrival, a TV Week writer commented "This fresh face is set to get tongues wagging". Kerry Harvey of Stuff.co.nz observed that Denny's job at the bait shop had "led to some heart-warming scenes" between her and Alf. Laura-Jayne Tyler from Inside Soap believed Denny "can hold her own with the Braxtons!" Following Casey's death, Stephen Downie of TV Week stated that Denny had "wrestled the kind of demons that would make Hulk Hogan cower in a corner." When Brax gave Casey's engagement ring to Denny, a reporter for the Coventry Evening Telegraph noted that "the poor girl is left heartbroken". When Denny and Ash met, a Birmingham Mail television critic branded them a "lovestruck pair". A contributor to Sunday Life noted that "sparks fly" between Denny and Ash. While debating whether Denny should move on with Ash, TV Week's Bianca La Cioppa stated that Denny had "better be ready for the backlash" from Casey fans. Of Denny's exit, a fellow TV Week reporter wrote that her "inquisitive nature inadvertently cost Denny her life".
