= Maddy Osborne =

- Home and Away character
- Portrayed by: Kassandra Clementi
- Duration: 2013–2016
- First appearance: 24 January 2013
- Last appearance: 31 May 2016
- Introduced by: Lucy Addario
In-universe information
- Occupation: Student
- Mother: Tanya Osborne
- Sisters: Annalise Osborne

Maddy Osborne is a fictional character from the Australian television soap opera Home and Away, played by Kassandra Clementi. Maddy made her first appearance during the episode broadcast on 24 January 2013. The actress was living abroad when she was offered the role and flew back to Sydney to take the role. Maddy is from a middle class Australian family and is a talented violinist. Despite this Maddy chose to run away from home and arrives in Summer Bay with her boyfriend Spencer Harrington (Andrew Morley). She is taken in by Roo Stewart (Georgie Parker) and Harvey Ryan (Marcus Graham). The storyline was part of producer Lucy Addario's vision for Home and Away to revisit the issues of fostering. Maddy settles into the local school and her relationship with Spencer comes to an end. Following this the character begins to misbehave and is involved in a car accident. The writers then paired her up with new character Josh Barrett (Jackson Gallagher) and their relationship dramas took Maddy through into her second year in the series. Maddy and Josh's relationship comes to an end and she behaves erratically after he gets with Evelyn MacGuire (Philippa Northeast). Maddy remains in love with Josh and an infidelity storyline soon follows.

Maddy, who also has sex with Oscar MacGuire (Jake Speer) is told she is pregnant and becomes unsure of who the father is. In a "storyline twist" Maddy is told that she is not pregnant and actually has ovarian cancer. Clementi branded it a "contemporary issue" and wanted to portray the "raw truth" of the illness. The plot explored Maddy taking chemotherapy, losing an ovary and facing the prospect of not having children. Maddy develops a connection with Oscar as he supports her and they go on to share a relationship. The storyline also introduced the character's mother Tanya Osborne (Kathryn Hartman), leading to exploration of their fictional backstories. In May 2016, Maddy is caught up in an explosion at the caravan park, resulting in a life-threatening injury to her arm, which is later amputated. Maddy is shown to be "broken and confused" by the whole ordeal. The storyline led to the character's departure from the show, as she plans to go to the city for rehabilitation, before going travelling. Clementi filmed her final scenes in late 2015, having decided to pursue new roles overseas. Her final scenes aired on 31 May 2016.

== Casting ==
The character was first seen during an official promo for the 2013 season. Clementi's casting was announced on 6 January 2013. The actress was living overseas and was offered the role on 4 July 2012. She immediately got an airplane to Sydney and accepted the role. The actress revealed that she was homesick for Australia and thought it was "a wonderful opportunity" to join Home and Away. She stated that she wanted to make Maddy "one of the most loved characters in Summer Bay."

== Development ==
=== Characterisation ===
"Maddy is an energetic, responsible girl who shows a maturity beyond her 16 years. She’s routine oriented and sets very high standards for herself. She also needs structure in her life, and to stay organised - if anything goes out of kilter, Maddy’s life can become a chaotic mess. The problem with Maddy’s perfectionist outlook is that, if she doesn’t think she can succeed at something, she won’t try it. She’s incredibly warm and accepting of everyone’s shortcomings except her own."

— Yahoo!7 on Maddy (2013)

She is described on the show's official website as being "a cautious kid and a thinker". She likes to play it safe and dislikes gossiping. Clementi described Maddy as being "an energetic and very loving young girl who is mature and wise beyond her 16 years. She can be a perfectionist and works hard to achieve her goals. She has a passion and flair for music - especially the violin." Despite Maddy being a talented violinist, Clementi can not play the instrument but has taken violin lessons. She told Yahoo!7's reporter that Maddy is "very quirky, bubbly and wise for her age and very mature." But because she is sixteen, she still makes mistakes and is in the process of finding out who she is. Maddy is from a middle class Australian family.

=== Introduction ===
In a November 2012 interview, producer Lucy Addario said that Home and Away would revisit the issue of fostering. The refocus allowed her to introduce "new talents" to the show. Maddy is a teen runaway, who arrives in the Bay with Spencer Harrington (Andrew Morley). Maddy falls ill and she and Spencer are found living in the local high school. They later turn up on the doorstep of Roo Stewart (Georgie Parker) and Harvey Ryan's (Marcus Graham) home. Clementi's co-star, Lynne McGranger (Irene Roberts), told Amie Parker-Williams from Digital Spy that Maddy and Spencer arrive with a secret and that an older brother, Chris (Johnny Ruffo), would also turn up and create some drama. The character's introduction comes after producers announced that they would feature more fostering storylines in the show. During a photo-shoot for TV Week, Clementi revealed that "they are really doing all they can to survive at that time, stealing food, and doing what they need, and sleeping in places they shouldn't be for shelter." Maddy and Spencer also want to protect their secret and Clementi said that this causes a lot of trust issues. It is the reason they are on the run and reluctant to tell people the truth. Sasha Bezmel (Demi Harman) discovers them sleeping in the school and convinces Roo to help. They leave Maddy and Spencer food and an offer of help. Clementi told a reporter from Inside Soap that "at first, they're very reserved about Roo's offer - they know that living with others presents the possibility that whatever they're hiding may be revealed." The duo remain reluctant to accept help until Maddy becomes ill. Maddy does not want to go to hospital. Clementi told Miller that her character is fearful that the hospital will contact her parents once they know her details. But she later noted that it was the point that Maddy accepts help.

Parker told Claire Crick from All About Soap that Roo can empathise with Maddy and Spencer because of her own history. Roo is "immediately drawn to them" and angry that no one else views them the same way. Parker was pleased with fostering themed storylines because the show was about "giving people with nowhere to go a home". Parker also wants Roo to become their actual foster parent.

Maddy decides that she is ready consummate her relationship with Spencer on his birthday. Morely told Inside Soap's reporter that "now they're more settled in the Bay and their relationship is stronger, they feel it is the right time." But the couple cannot get privacy due to Chris' presence. Spencer manages to solve the problem, but as they get passionate, it makes them feel awkward. Morely explained that the lovers are under pressure, have other things on their minds and do not feel right. This event makes Maddy question their relationship.

=== Car accident ===
Following her break-up with Spencer she begins to behave erratically. She befriends Casey Braxton (Lincoln Younes) who is upset over his ex-girlfriend Tamara Kingsley (Kelly Paterniti). She decides to comfort him and tries to seduce him. Younes explained that his character rejects her advances because he senses that she will feel better in the future. He knows that she is doing it for the wrong reasons and chooses to do the "noble thing". Maddy later attends a party with Casey and meets Josh Barrett (Jackson Gallagher). Roo attempts to convince Maddy to come home but she refuses. She sneaks off with Josh to avoid Casey taking her home. Younes told a TV Week reporter that Casey knows Maddy is trying to lose her virginity and he believes it is not right. When Casey drags Maddy away from Josh a fight ensues and they drive off.

However Josh and his brother Andy Barrett (Tai Hara) start a car chase. Younes explained that Maddy is making amends with Casey when they are suddenly hit by a four-wheel-drive. He revealed that "Maddy is unconscious and the car is burning so he has to act very quickly, he's really hurt but manages to carry Maddy out of the car before it explodes." The car then explodes and the impact knocks the two characters to the ground. No one realises they are missing and are found the following morning when Maddy gets help. The crash and explosion were part of big stunt scenes for Home and Away. Younes revealed that he filmed his own stunts carrying Clementi when the explosion impacted. The car chase scenes were filmed at night on location down a narrow road. The cast described the shoot as a "scary" scenario.

=== Relationship with Josh Barrett ===
Following the accident Maddy tries to support Josh. He decides to try to make amends with the Braxton family but they are not interested. She comforts him and they kiss. Gallagher told Gavin Scott (TV Week) that it his "dream come true". He added that "Maddy is just this beautiful girl, he's blown away by her beauty. He has fallen in love with how sweet and caring she is."

Their relationship later becomes scrutinised by fellow characters following a fire at Mangrove River High School. The police believe that Maddy and Josh have started the fire because they find CCTV footage placing them at the scene of the crime. Clementi told TV Week's Erin Miller that the fire is bad and leaves the school unusable. Maddy and Josh were sleeping there after they ran away from home but their trespassing makes them suspects. Roo is disappointed with Maddy and is unsure of her innocence. The actress added "Roo freaks out because she knows if there's hard evidence, they may be involved, she's scared Josh and Maddy could get into a lot of trouble. Maddy did not start the fire and protests her innocence." The storyline marked the first time their relationship becomes problematic. Clementi explained that Maddy suspects Josh of arson and which makes him angry and "it throws a spanner in the works for their relationship." She also noted that despite his bad track record Maddy has continued to be there for Josh. But Roo believes he is responsible and decides to warn Josh to keep away from Maddy. Gallagher told Miller that "he's developed quite strong feelings for Maddy, but thinks it might be in her best interest for him to leave." Writers continued to use Maddy's involvement with Josh as ways to create dangerous scenarios for the character. One example occurred when Josh chooses to spend time with Maddy, leaving his brother Andy jealous. The latter spikes Maddy's drink and she begins to behave oddly. Josh discovers the truth and fight ensues over Maddy.

Josh and Maddy's relationship comes to an end. He begins dating Evelyn MacGuire (Philippa Northeast) but Maddy remains in love with Josh. When he refuses to take Evelyn to the school formal because he is embarrassed over his financial situation, Maddy assumes that he still wants to be with her instead. Gallagher believed that the partnership between Josh and Evelyn is stronger than the one he shared with Maddy. He felt that they experienced a lack of mutual respect, adding that "with Maddy he always felt like he was beneath her, and that she would talk down to him." Following Casey's death Josh is feeling vulnerable and Evelyn rebuffs his attempts at being intimate. Josh seeks comfort with Maddy and they sleep together. Maddy also uses a previous one-night-stand Oscar MacGuire (Jake Speer) and this angers Evelyn more. Northeast told Downie that Maddy takes advantage of Josh when he is vulnerable. But she also feels like she pushed Josh into having sex with Maddy because she wouldn't. The actress concluded that Maddy was able to give Josh something that Evelyn could not.

=== Cancer ===
The show created an issue led plot for Maddy which began airing in November 2014. Maddy is taken ill during the night with a "mystery illness". Doctor Nate Cooper (Kyle Pryor) assumes it is a virus but runs blood tests to find out. Maddy discover that she is pregnant and assumes that Josh is the father. But when Marilyn Chambers (Emily Symons) points out that she looks more than eight weeks pregnant she realises that Oscar might be the father. Clementi explained that "she's always been in love with Josh and regards it as an opportunity to become a family with him. Maddy tells Oscar everything but tries to prevent Josh from learning the truth.

When Maddy goes to have a scan to determine the father Nate is shocked to discover that she is not pregnant. Nate informs her that she has a suspicious mass growing on one of her ovaries. Clementi said that it no-one saw the shock coming. The news is "life changing" for Maddy, and she had already endured too much drama during the suspected pregnancy. Maddy decides to go ahead with an operation to remove the mass. But Nate informs her that they also had to remove her ovary, lessening the chance of her having children. Maddy is told that she has an aggressive form of cancer and will need to begin chemotherapy. Maddy is left with an "indescribable feeling" and fears it may be the end of her life. Other character decide to offer her their support, but Maddy refuses to see anyone. Clementi defended her character stating that she feels "suffocated" and people are "crowding her". She cannot come to terms with her diagnosis because "it's all too much". She is also reluctant to start chemotherapy because she wants to decide on treatment option. The actress believed her character was not behaving weak but rather using her "strong and smart" personality traits to fight the illness. But Nate warns her that she needs to begin treatment right away to survive. Clementi believed the storyline was a "contemporary issue" and hoped it was portrayed "in the right light". The actress was an ambassador for a cancer charity, so was keen to depict the "raw truth" of the illness. Her main priority for her was to do the storyline justice and make it accurate for real life cancer patients.

Maddy learns that having chemotherapy may mean she will be infertile. Having already had one ovary removed, Nate tells her that her only hope is having tissue removed and stored. Clementi explained that her character only thought about starting a family when she got believed that she was pregnant, but that was taken away from her. She added that when she is left alone in hospital, "a wave of clarity washes over her". She believes that her prognosis means her treatment may not work and she may die. So Maddy decides to run away and gain new experiences. When Roo learns that Maddy has left she asks Oscar to help find her. He discovers her "bucket list" and realises where she is. Oscar travels to the city to find Maddy and convinces her to return home for treatment. Clementi later commented that she believed Maddy's time in the city helps her accept her diagnosis. She has the space she needs to think and realise her cancer may not be a "death sentence". Oscars influence helps her to be a "strong woman" and he continues to support her. The actress noted a "connection that is unspoken" and "unbreakable bond" between Maddy and Oscar, adding "he really gets through to her".

Writer's decided to introduce a romantic side plot in which Maddy embraces her feelings for Oscar and they begin dating. But she begins to overexert herself which leads to her nose bleeding while on a date with Oscar. Speer believed "the shadow of cancer is unavoidable" and it serves as a stark reminder she is undertaking serious treatment. He goes into "protective mode" but wants to remain positive for Maddy. He believed that while Oscar was worried and concerned, he is the only character not "wrapping her up in cotton wool". But Oscar soon realises that Maddy's illness is affecting his school work and he decides to break-up with her. In an additional story writers dealt the absence of Maddy's mother Tanya Osborne (Kathryn Hartman). Roo realises that Tanya should be informed and Maddy telephones her. Tanya arrives in Summer Bay and is angry at Roo for not informing her. She demands that Maddy return home with her. Parker noted that Maddy's relationship with her mother is "dysfunctional" and that Maddy leaving with Tanya would be like losing a child. Maddy needs a "stable environment" while battling cancer and Roo can offer her that.

=== Amputation and departure ===
Maddy is one of several characters heavily involved in the show's caravan park explosion storyline. She suffers a life-threatening injury to her arm, which requires amputation. Maddy is "hysterical" upon learning that she will need to have her arm amputated in order to stop the spread of deadly toxins in her body. She initially refuses to sign the consent forms until Roo convinces her that the surgery will save her life. Stephen Downie of TV Week noted that Maddy is left "broken and confused" by the ordeal. She begins questioning her future and whether Matt will still want to be with her. As she struggles to cope with being an amputee, Maddy makes a "misguided move" to flee the hospital, unaware that she has a serious infection. Maddy hides out in a hotel, where she collapses after suffering a sudden pain in her chest. She tries to crawl to her phone, but passes out before she can make a call.

After Maddy is found, she makes plans to leave Summer Bay for a rehabilitation centre in the city, before she goes travelling. Georgie Parker commented: "I think Maddy feels that, having battled cancer and survived it, and having been through this horrific accident, she just wants to get out. She's a young women now. She's left school and wants the freedom to experience the world." Roo supports Maddy's plans, but is "an emotional wreck" and admits to Alf that she is not ready for Maddy to leave, having come to think of her like a daughter. Parker explained that Roo has been a mother figure to Maddy and her wanting to leave brings up "an enormous sense of loss."

Maddy's last scenes aired on 31 May 2016. Clementi later admitted that she had decided to leave Home and Away after four years to pursue new acting roles in Los Angeles, where she had secured management. She filmed her final scenes in late 2015. In a post on her social media, Clementi stated "And that's a goodbye to Maddy Osborne! From 2012 - 2016 and through several runaways, teenage pregnancy, ovarian cancer, meningitis, a few explosions, the loss of a limb, lots of tears and more boyfriends than I can count... Thank you for watching Maddy grow up (and me simultaneously) on the sands of Summer Bay and for all the love and support for one little teenage runaway xxx."

== Reception ==
An Inside Soap reporter branded Maddy panicking about her pregnancy predicament a soap highlight. Stephen Downie from TV Week branded Maddy "trouble with a capital t" and the "Summer Bay wild child". He questioned if the character was just out of control, adding "stealing, drinking... just what will the girl do next?" In May 2016, following Maddy's arm amputation, some viewers believed that the show had made a continuity error and shown a scene in which her amputated arm switched sides. The supposed mistake was also noted by Media Watch. However, Seven later pointed out that the character was actually looking in a mirror during the scene and the image was her reflection.
