= List of Home and Away characters introduced in 2013 =

Home and Away is an Australian television soap opera. It was first broadcast on the Seven Network on 17 January 1988. The following is a list of characters that first appeared or will appear in 2013, by order of first appearance. All characters are introduced by the soap's executive producer, Lucy Addario. The 26th season of Home and Away began airing from 21 January 2013. The first introduction of the year was Zac MacGuire then followed by Courtney Freeman, Maddy Osborne, Spencer Harrington and Rosie Prichard who all made their debuts in the same month. Chris Harrington and Ricky Sharpe arrived in April. Josh, Andy Barrett and Hannah Wilson debuted in August, while Zac's family – Ethan, Evelyn and Oscar MacGuire – began appearing from September, as did Nate Cooper. Jade Montgomery and Matt Page arrived in October, while Phoebe Nicholson debuted in November.

== Zac MacGuire ==
Zac MacGuire, played by Charlie Clausen, made his first screen appearance on 22 January 2013. The character and casting was announced on 13 January 2013. A TV Week reporter noted that the role marked something of a return to acting for Clausen. The actor commented "I'm very excited to join the cast of Home and Away. I found out I got the role on my birthday and I couldn't think of a better gift. It's a fantastic opportunity for any actor and I've been made to feel really welcome by the cast, crew and production team. I'm looking forward to 2013 and beyond." Zac is a prison education officer who encounters Casey Braxton (Lincoln Younes) when he breaks up a brawl. Clausen revealed that Zac has been asked to keep an eye on Casey by Natalie Davison (Catherine Mack). The actor stated that Zac is "a good guy", who began working in the prison system after spending time inside when he was younger.

== Courtney Freeman ==
Courtney Freeman
- Home and Away character
- Portrayed by: Joshua Brennan
- First appearance: 22 January 2013
- Last appearance: 7 March 2013
- Introduced by: Lucy Addario

Courtney Freeman, played by Joshua Brennan, made his first screen appearance on 22 January 2013. The character and casting was announced on 14 January 2013. Courtney is an inmate at Crestview Correctional Centre, which Casey Braxton (Lincoln Younes) has to attend for his part in a failed robbery. Casey's efforts to try to keep to himself fail when Courtney notices him and they have a "run-in". Younes described Courtney as being a "stereotypical prison bully." When Casey is placed in the prison kitchens, Courtney asks him to keep an eye on some food delivery that contain drugs. When Casey stands up to Courtney and refuses, he is left "battered and bruised" by the encounter.

Courtney takes a dislike to Casey and begins to make his stay difficult. He orders Casey to help with drug smuggling and attacks him when he refuses. When Jamie Sharpe (Hugo Johnstone-Burt) arrives at the facility, Courtney learns of the Braxton's animosity with the Sharpe family. He uses his gang to intimidate Jamie into attacking Casey. Zac MacGuire (Charlie Clausen) breaks up the fight. When Casey learns Courtney has asked Jamie to run drugs for him, Casey begs Jamie to say no and stand up for himself. Courtney manages to get Jamie alone and attacks him. When Casey tries to help Jamie, Courtney stabs Casey with a shiv. Zac manages to arrange a deal in which Casey is released and Jamie is transferred to another prison in return for them giving evidence against Courtney.

== Maddy Osborne ==
Madeline "Maddy" Osborne, played by Kassandra Clementi, made her first screen appearance on 24 January 2013. The character was first seen during an official promo for the 2013 season. Clementi's casting was announced on 6 January 2013. The actress revealed that she was homesick for Australia and thought it was "a wonderful opportunity" to join Home and Away. Maddy was a teen runaway, who arrived in the Bay with Spencer Harrington (Andrew Morley). The character's introduction comes after producers announced that they would feature more fostering storylines in the show. Clementi described Maddy as being "an energetic and very loving young girl who is mature and wise beyond her 16 years."

== Spencer Harrington ==
Spencer Harrington
- Home and Away character
- Portrayed by: Andrew Morley
- Duration: 2013–2015
- First appearance: 24 January 2013
- Last appearance: 23 April 2015
- Introduced by: Lucy Addario
In-universe information
- Occupation: Student; Gym trainer
- Father: Ian Harrington
- Brothers: Chris Harrington

Spencer Harrington, played by Andrew Morley, made his first screen appearance on 24 January 2013. The character was first seen during a promotional trailer for the serial's 2013 season. On 22 January, Home and Away released Morley's official cast shots. On 1 March 2015, it was announced that Morley had quit Home and Away after two years to pursue acting opportunities in the United States. Morley finished filming in late 2014. Spencer departed on 23 April 2015.

Spencer was a teen runaway, who arrived in Summer Bay with Maddy Osborne (Kassandra Clementi). They initially set up home in the local high school, but are discovered by Sasha Bezmel (Demi Harman). Clementi revealed that Maddy and Spencer are trying to cover up a secret and that they are scared of what their parents will do when they find out where they are. They later turn up at Roo Stewart (Georgie Parker) and Harvey Ryan's (Marcus Graham) home. It was also announced that new character, Chris (Johnny Ruffo), would be related to Maddy and Spencer and that he would create some drama for them. Maddy and Spencer's introductions came shortly after producers announced that they would feature more fostering storylines in the show. Describing his character, Morley said "Spencer is genuine, confident and a big charmer. He has a quality that turns heads and his positive attitude enlightens those around him. Spencer is a romantic, loyal and selfless man that puts the ones he cares for above and beyond himself."

Spencer and Maddy come to the Summer Bay Caravan Park to ask Roo Stewart for caravan. At The Diner, Spencer reveals that he cannot pay for their meal, but promises to come back with the money. He later works off his debt and tells Roo that his parents are dead. Spencer and Maddy spend the night on a boat, before moving to the local high school. Spencer becomes concerned when Maddy gets sick. When they learn that Roo knows they are staying at the school, Spencer and Maddy initially disagree about contacting her. However, Maddy's health deteriorates and Spencer calls Roo. She and Harvey bring them back to Summer Bay House for the night. Spencer and Maddy later run away, but struggle out in the bush. They return to the caravan park and discover an injured Romeo Smith (Luke Mitchell) in the shed. Maddy fetches Roo to help and she and Spencer later decide that they can trust Roo. Spencer is given a job in the bait shop and Maddy reveals that they are not brother and sister, but lovers. Spencer's brother Chris (Johnny Rufflo) turns up in Summer Bay and becomes a third wheel in their relationship. Spencer and Maddy eventually break up.

Spencer gets into a relationship with Sasha Bezmel (Demi Harman), and Maddy is jealous. They have sex within weeks of becoming a couple, further infuriating Maddy. Chris returns to the Bay to try and win Sasha's sister Indi Walker (Samara Weaving) back, and he argues with Sasha, trapping Spencer in the middle again.

== Rosie Prichard ==
Rosie Prichard
- Home and Away character
- Portrayed by: Teri Haddy
- First appearance: 30 January 2013
- Last appearance: 15 July 2013
- Introduced by: Lucy Addario
In-universe information
- Occupation: Student
- Adoptive mother: Kerry Doyle (foster)

Rosie Prichard, played by Teri Haddy, made her first screen appearance on 30 January 2013. The character and casting was announced on 13 January 2013. Shortly after she relocated to Sydney in May 2012, Haddy won the role of Rosie. She is six years older than her character, who is sixteen upon her entrance. Haddy called her character "sweet, but awkward" and noted that she is a bit of "a loner". Rosie has always lived in Summer Bay, but has never been seen on-screen before. She looks up to Sasha Bezmel (Demi Harman) and when they eventually become friends, Sasha invites her to a party. Haddy revealed "Rosie hears she used to be with Casey and gets excited because, to her, he's like royalty in Summer Bay."

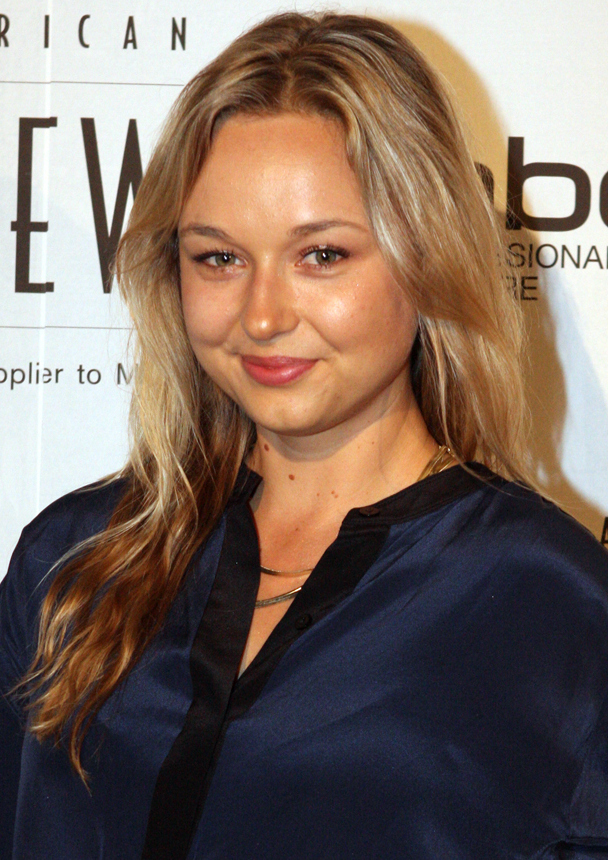
Teri Haddy plays Rosie Prichard

In early April, Rosie was raped by fellow student Alexander Mullens (Louis McIntosh). Haddy explained "It's Rosie's first boyfriend and because he paid her all this attention and she felt really special, at first she doesn't see it as him attacking her. They were spending time together kissing, so she feels like she brought this on herself." Rosie goes to Sasha and Roo Stewart (Georgie Parker) and tells them what has happened to her. She also goes to the police to report Mullens. Haddy told Erin Miller from TV Week that she did research into how teenage girls have coped with being sexually assaulted. She also hoped the storyline would show girls that they do not have to be afraid to say no to what the guy is asking.

Rosie and Sasha Bezmel pair up for a science assignment. Sasha tries to get Rosie to touch a crab at the pier, but she becomes scared and falls into the sea. Sasha then jumps in to help her and they become friends. Rosie is invited to a toga party at Sasha's home and she is excited to meet Sasha's ex-boyfriend, Casey Braxton (Lincoln Younes). She later mistakes his kindness for flirting. Sasha notices Rosie talking to Natalie Davison (Catherine Mack) and presumes that Rosie has problems. She begins to question Rosie about her family. Rosie refuses to let Sasha stay over her house and pays Tilda Hogan (Gigi Perry) to pretend to be her younger sister Hannah. Sasha discovers Tilda's real identity from Jett James (Will McDonald) and she follows Rosie home, when she confronts her, Rosie reveals that her mum left her when she was young and her dad splits his time between her and his second family in the city, and Rosie lives on her own. When Sasha befriends Maddy Osborne (Kassandra Clementi), Rosie becomes jealous. She decides to run into the sea, despite not being able to swim well and Sasha has to run in and save her. However, both girls get caught in a rip and have to be saved by Casey and John Palmer (Shane Withington).

Sasha distances herself from Rosie, who befriends some other teens from the school. Rosie kisses Alexander Mullens and he brags about taking advantage of her. Sasha tries to get Rosie to stop hanging out with Mullens, but she refuses. While on a date, Mullens rapes Rosie and she initially blames herself for what has happened. Sasha supports Rosie, as she reports Mullens to the police. Rosie attends Zac MacGuire's (Charlie Clausen) self-defence classes and befriends Bella Lugrano (Hayley Mitchell-Miller), who later tells her that she was raped by Mullens too. The next day, Bella meets up with Rosie and Sasha at the Diner and tells them that she reported her rape to the police. One of Mullens's friends, Lachlan Stone (Michael Windeyer) stalks Rosie and scares her. At self-defence, she becomes frightened when Lachlan shows up and Maddy, Tamara and Sasha try to comfort her. Zac asks Lachlan to leave, but he explains that he just wants to talk to Rosie, as he has Mullens's text messages and videos of her rape. Rosie asks him to go to the police. A few days later, Mullens is arrested. While working at the Diner, Rosie collapses and soon learns that she is pregnant. Rosie briefly leaves school, as she feels unsafe, but she soon returns. Holly Chapman (Sacha Vivian-Riding) bullies Rosie about her pregnancy and her bond with Zac. Rosie decides to keep the baby and she later leaves the Bay to live in the city with her father.

== Chris Harrington ==
Chris Harrington, played by Johnny Ruffo, made his first screen appearance on 1 April 2013. The character and Ruffo's casting was announced on 19 October 2012. Ruffo told Christine Sams from The Sydney Morning Herald that he had asked his agent to check out what roles were available, when the Home and Away part came up. After his first audition, he received a callback for a second audition. Ruffo called himself "very fortunate" after learning he had won the role because quite a few people also tried out for it. Home and Away marks Ruffo's acting debut and he relocated from Perth to Sydney for filming. He was initially contracted to appear in about sixteen episodes and he began shooting his first scenes in September. Ruffo's contract was later extended. Of his casting, Ruffo stated "I'm thrilled to be joining Home and Away. The cast and crew have made me feel so welcome and can't wait for everyone to meet my character Chris next year." Chris is Spencer Harrington's (Andrew Morley) older brother. He comes to Summer Bay to visit Spencer and convince him to return home and sort things out with his family.

== Ricky Sharpe ==
Erica "Ricky" Sharpe, played by Bonnie Sveen, made her first screen appearance on 2 April 2013. Sveen previously appeared in the small guest role of Hayley Doven in 2010. She told Tim Martain from The Mercury that she was "thrilled" to receive the ongoing role of Ricky. She explained "I wanted Ricky more than anything I've ever auditioned for. I often think of my Nan [a huge fan of the show]. Home and Away was often on the telly at her house...and now I'm a River Girl." Ricky is Adam Sharpe's (Martin Lynes) younger sister. Amy Mills from New Idea revealed that Ricky would arrive in Summer Bay to attend Heath Braxton's (Dan Ewing) engagement party. She also became a love interest for Heath's older brother, Brax (Stephen Peacocke), who she has known since he was a teenager. In 2014, Sveen won the Most Popular New Talent Logie Award for her portrayal of Ricky.

== Josh Barrett ==
Joshua "Josh" Barrett, played by Jackson Gallagher, made his first screen appearance on 27 August 2013. The character and Gallagher's casting was reported by Debbie Schipp from The Daily Telegraph on 3 August 2013. Gallagher admitted he was starstruck when he filmed a scene with long term cast member Ray Meagher (who plays Alf Stewart), adding "That was when it hit home." Josh was introduced to the show along with his brother Andy (Tai Hara). The characters first appeared in online webisodes, which explored their backgrounds. On 14 May 2016, Kerry Harvey of Stuff.co.nz reported that Gallagher would be leaving Home and Away. His character will depart following his confession about shooting Charlotte King (Erika Heynatz).

== Andy Barrett ==
Andrew "Andy" Barrett, played by Tai Hara, made his first screen appearance on 28 August 2013. The character and Hara's casting was reported by Debbie Schipp from The Daily Telegraph on 3 August 2013. Of being cast in Home and Away, Hara commented "I thought how lucky I was. It's just a real privilege to be on a show that is so loved." Andy was introduced to the show along with his younger brother Josh (Jackson Gallagher). The characters first appeared in online webisodes, which explored their backgrounds. The Barretts were initially rivals of the Braxton brothers and Hara said "There is a lot of history behind both the families. I carry the secrets of what our whole relationship is with them."

== Hannah Wilson ==
Hannah Wilson, played by Cassie Howarth, made her first screen appearance on 29 August 2013. The character and casting was announced in late August 2013. Hannah was described as being "a free spirit". Howarth called her character strong and determined. She also stated that Hannah would "fight fiercely for her family", but she has a fear of being alone and needs to be loved. Hannah comes to Summer Bay to ask Zac MacGuire (Charlie Clausen) for his help, when she believes their niece and nephew are being brainwashed by a cult that Zac's brother, Ethan (Matt Minto), has got them involved in. Howarth called the storyline "hard-hitting" and added that it was not a smooth transition to life in the Bay.

== Ethan MacGuire ==
Ethan MacGuire
- Home and Away character
- Portrayed by: Matt Minto
- Duration: 2013–2014
- First appearance: 2 September 2013
- Last appearance: 27 January 2014
- Introduced by: Lucy Addario
In-universe information
- Occupation: Lawyer
- Brothers: Zac MacGuire
- Wife: Sarah Wilson
- Sons: Oscar MacGuire
- Daughters: Denny Miller; Evelyn MacGuire

Ethan MacGuire, played by Matt Minto, made his first screen appearance on 2 September 2013. The character and casting was announced in late August 2013. Minto originally auditioned for another role with the serial, but was offered the part of Ethan instead. He began filming in April 2013. Ethan is Zac MacGuire's (Charlie Clausen) estranged brother. He has got himself and his teenage children Evelyn (Philippa Northeast) and Oscar (Jake Speer) involved in a cult and has moved them into the camp. When Zac comes to visit, Ethan greets him "warmly" and tries to pass the cult off as a group enlightenment camp. Zac eventually teams up with Ethan's sister-in-law Hannah (Cassie Howarth) to try to get the children out of the cult, but it proves difficult and Ethan is "hard to fight." The character has also been described as being "controlling". Carena Crawford from All About Soap branded the character "Evil Ethan". Ethan departed on 27 January 2014.

Following the death of his wife, Ethan moved his children, Oscar and Evelyn, to an enlightenment camp run by Murray Granger (Christopher Stollery), which turns out to be a cult. Ethan's late wife's sister Hannah visits the family and tries to get the twins to come live with her. She later turns to Ethan's brother, Zac, for help. Zac comes to the camp to visit Ethan and the twins. Ethan later catches Oscar contacting Zac and he is beaten. Zac returns, but Ethan and Evelyn warn him to stay away. He is then issued with an AVO on behalf of Ethan. Zac, along with Darryl (Steve Peacocke), Heath (Dan Ewing) and Kyle Braxton (Nic Westaway), manages to rescue the twins from the cult. Evelyn later returns to be with her father. When Spencer Harrington (Andrew Morley) is beaten, Evelyn pleads with Ethan to help her get Spencer to a hospital and away from the cult. Murray is arrested for assaulting Spencer and Ethan takes over the cult. During a music festival, he has Oscar and Evelyn kidnapped. When Kyle tries to intervene, he is hit over the head and Ethan takes Kyle with them. Oscar, Evelyn and Kyle are locked inside a shipping container. Ethan goes to the hospital to tell Hannah not to worry about the twins anymore. Shortly after, a bomb explodes, leaving Ethan badly injured. Hannah helps him, but he later goes into cardiac arrest and dies.

== Evelyn MacGuire ==
Evelyn "Evie" MacGuire, played by Philippa Northeast, made her first screen appearance on 3 September 2013. The character and casting was announced in late August 2013. Evelyn is the niece of established character Zac MacGuire (Charlie Clausen) and the twin of Oscar MacGuire (Jake Speer). Oscar and Evelyn are introduced to the show when Zac visits them after he is told that their father, Ethan (Matt Minto), has got them involved in a cult. Evelyn was happy to be living at the camp, but her brother disliked it. Describing her character, Northeast stated "Evelyn believes strongly in the value of family, having lost her mother at an early age and witnessing her father try to deal with the repercussions. This, in turn, has strengthened the sibling bond she shares with Oscar, in whom she finds comfort and entertainment." She called Evelyn gentle, but said that she has "a sharp sense of humour" and will voice her feelings, especially is she feels that her opinions are not being heard.

== Oscar MacGuire ==
Oscar MacGuire, played by Jake Speer, made his first screen appearance on 3 September 2013. The character and casting was announced in late August 2013. Speer successfully auditioned for the role of Oscar in early 2013. Of his casting, Speer said "It's pretty incredible now that I'm able to talk about it ... obviously my close friends and family knew. I've been on the show since April ... I didn't really know what to expect to start off with, but it's been fantastic." Oscar is the nephew of established character Zac MacGuire (Charlie Clausen) and the twin of Evelyn (Philippa Northeast). The twins were introduced along with their father, Ethan (Matt Minto), as part of a cult stroryline. Oscar was uncomfortable with his father's decision to move him and his sister into the cult's camp and he struggled to "maintain his individuality and survive."

== Nate Cooper ==
Nathaniel "Nate" Cooper, played by Kyle Pryor, made his first screen appearance on 26 September 2013. The character and casting was announced on 8 September 2013. Pryor originally auditioned for the role of Andy Barrett, but Tai Hara was cast instead. However, the producers liked Pryor so much, that they asked him to return to try out for the part of Nate. Pryor had begun filming four months prior to his casting announcement. Of having to keep his role a secret, the actor admitted "It can be quite difficult not spilling the beans but it is a good exercise in self-control." Doctor Nathaniel Cooper takes a position at the Northern Districts Hospital, despite wanting to work at a bigger hospital in the city to further his "climb up the professional ladder, to a speciality and beyond."

== Jade Montgomery ==
Jade Montgomery
- Home and Away character
- Portrayed by: Tasma Walton
- Duration: 2013–14
- First appearance: 16 October 2013
- Last appearance: 29 January 2014
- Introduced by: Lucy Addario
In-universe information
- Occupation: Principal of Mangrove River High (until 2013); Deputy principal of Summer Bay High (2013)

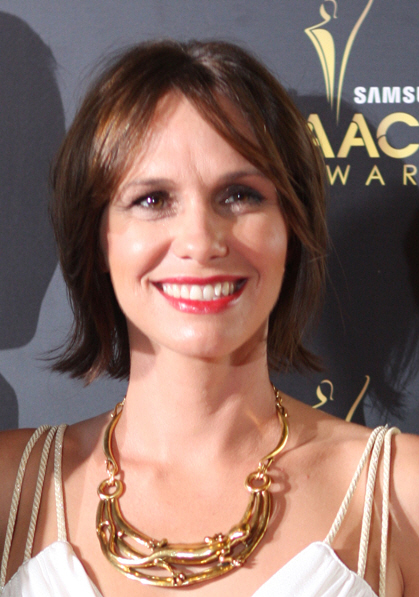
Tasma Walton played Jade

Jade Montgomery, played by Tasma Walton, made her first screen appearance on 16 October 2013. The character and Walton's casting was announced on 27 July 2013. Walton previously appeared in Home and Away as Rachel Watson in 1995. The actress accepted the offer to appear in the show again as it coincided with the premiere of a film that she features in, which was shown at the Sydney Film Festival. Walton commented "I try to get back for a couple of months at this time each year, and the timing was perfect." Debbie Schipp from The Daily Telegraph reported that Walton had begun shooting her scenes a couple of weeks before her casting announcement. Jade Montgomery is a teacher, who was on-screen for "over a couple of months", as her story led into the season finale for 2013. She departed on 29 January 2014.

Jade Montgomery is the headmistress of Mangrove River High and when it burns down in an arson attack she arrives in Summer Bay to negotiate the merger between her school and Summer Bay High. When she learns that Bianca Scott (Lisa Gormley) will continue to serve as head of Summer Bay throughout the merger, Montgomery is put out and does not believe Bianca will be able to handle the students. She also criticises Bianca's husband, Heath Braxton (Dan Ewing), a former pupil of hers, and clearly discriminates against him. When she does the same to Mangrove River High students including Matt Page (Alec Snow), Bianca disciplines her, and as a result, Montgomery trashes her office, graffitis the word “slag” on her door, and frames Page for the crime. Bianca and several of her colleagues including Leah Patterson-Baker (Ada Nicodemou) suspect Montgomery of being behind several crimes committed at the school, and when they manage to get evidence of this from Matt, Montgomery is suspended. Wanting revenge against Bianca, she purchases a bomb and places it in Bianca's laptop bag to try and kill her. The bomb goes off at the Northern Districts Hospital, and results in the death of Ethan Macguire (Matt Minto). When Montgomery discovers what has happened, she panics and Heath realises that she was behind the explosion. Heath engages in a brutal interrogation with Montgomery, before Andy arrives and tries to talk Heath out of getting revenge. Montgomery uses this distraction to attempt to flee, while being pursued by Heath and Andy. They are confronted by Leah and John Palmer (Shane Withington), and Montgomery tries to make it look like Heath is crazy, but to her horror, Leah reveals that she knows Montgomery was responsible for the bombing, as Page revealed Montgomery's actions to her earlier, and has called the police on her. Montgomery ultimately breaks down and confesses to all her crimes and her motives for committing them, before she is subsequently arrested.

== Matt Page ==
Matthew "Matt" Page, played by Alec Snow, made his first screen appearance on 21 October 2013. Snow was cast as Matt after attending an audition in early 2013. He told Nick Houghton from The Toowoomba Chronicle that he was nervous ahead of the audition and did not expect to win the role. However, he received a call back the next day and won the part. He then went to Sydney to shoot his scenes. Snow was initially contracted for a three-month stint. Of his casting, Snow said "It is an absolute privilege to be on Home and Away. It truly is an iconic show and I am very proud to be a part of it." Snow later signed a contract to stay with the show for three-years. Snow called his character a "troubled kid", who does not where he fits in. The actor added "He is a bit confused about life and definitely ruffles people's feathers in the Bay."

== Phoebe Nicholson ==
Phoebe Nicholson, played by Isabella Giovinazzo, made her first screen appearance on 26 November 2013. The character and casting was announced on 24 November 2013. After relocating to Sydney in mid-2013, Giovinazzo successfully auditioned for the role of Phoebe. It is her first acting job. Of joining the show, the actress commented "It's been a lot of fun. I'm still figuring out what to do. Phoebe's been a really great person to start with. Just developing her character and rounding this woman has been wonderful and I've got a lot to play with because she's a little bit kooky." Phoebe arrives in Summer Bay after learning that her ex-boyfriend Kyle Braxton (Nic Westaway) is putting together a music festival. Phoebe is a singer and songwriter, who grew up with Kyle in Melbourne and was "brokenhearted" when he moved away. Phoebe was billed as being "a bright, attractive and boundlessly energetic young woman".

== Others ==
Date(s)	Character	Actor	Circumstances
5 February	Gavin Wheeler	Ande Cunningham	Gavin is a social worker who visits Heath Braxton and Bianca Scott to discuss their application for custody of Heath's daughter Darcy Callahan. He comments on the fact Heath is still sharing with his brothers and questions Heath about his criminal history and the timing of his application. He informs them he will pass on his assessment to his supervisors. (The character is credited as Gavin MacIntosh but referred to as Gavin Wheeler.)
8 February–29 July 2014	Connie Callahan	Celia Ireland	Connie is Darcy Callahan's grandmother. She meets with Heath Braxton and Bianca Scott to discuss Darcy living with them full-time. Connie contacts the Department of Community Services and is awarded full custody of Darcy. She later comes to Darryl Braxton and tells him that Heath has taken Darcy from school. Connie takes Darcy home and she has minimal contact with Heath. Darcy leaves Connie's to go to Heath and Bianca's house, and later states that she wants to be with her father. When Connie sees Heath is trying to make an effort, she decides to have Heath's name put on the birth certificate. Connie later agrees that Darcy can move to the city with Heath and Bianca.
12 February	Eugene Broad	Sonny Vrobao	Eugene is a drug dealer, who meets with Darryl Braxton. Before their deal is completed, Darryl's brother, Heath, finds a gunman outside and Eugene makes his escape. Outside, he drives his car at Brax, but Adam Sharpe pushes him out of the way, taking the full impact of the car.
13–15 February	Nelson Gregory	Anthony Gee	Nelson is Tamara Kingsley's ex-boyfriend, who comes to Summer Bay to find her. Tamara agrees to return home with Nelson, to stop him from hurting Casey Braxton. However, Kyle Braxton knocks Nelson out and helps take him to the police station. Tamara then tells the police about Nelson's part in the death of her brother and he is arrested.
13–21 February	Dr Padley	Nicholas Brown	Sid Walker visits Dr Padley, fearing that he may be having a breakdown. Padley counsels him as a voluntary patient at a clinic and Sid discharges himself after speaking with his son Dexter.
15 February–6 October 2014	Nina Bailey	Emmy Dougall	Nina attends the Summer Bay disco and takes a liking to Jett James. However, she is too nervous to ask him to dance. Jett comes over and asks her instead. Quite a while later, Nina and Jett start a relationship. However, they break up because Jett is persuaded by his mate VJ that Nina was stealing but they get back together when Jett sings a song to her. Nina later breaks up with Jett when her parents make her change to a boarding school after Mangrove River High students transfer to Summer Bay High. Nina comes back and she and Jett run away when their parents, particularly John Palmer, try to take her back. They end up at the farmhouse where they are eventually found by Spencer Harrington who advises them, on his own past experience, not to continue this. He then takes the pair back to John at the Surf Club and Nina goes home. She later returns to be Jett's date at John and Marilyn Chambers' wedding. In 2015, Jett returns to Summer Bay told John that he and Nina broke up since they couldn't handle with the long distance of their relationship.
15 February–15 March	Tilda Hogan	Gigi Perry	Tilda attends a school dance at the surf club. Rosie Prichard introduces Tilda as her younger sister, Hannah, to Sasha Bezmel. Tilda later bullies Jett James into doing their joint assignment by himself. But with Maddy and Spencer's help Jett stands up to Tilda and she backs off after being humiliated in class.
15 February	Olivia Fraser	Tiahn Green	Olivia is a girl at the Summer Bay disco that Jett James attempts to ask to dance but he is unable to remember her name. After Liam Murphy has arranged for Sasha Bezmel and Rosie Prichard to dance with Jett, Olivia and her friends join them.
18–19 February, 16 April 2015 – 31 May 2016	Tanya Osborne	Kathryn Hartman	Roo Stewart invites Tanya to Summer Bay to see her daughter, Maddy and Spencer Harrington, who have moved in with Roo. Both Roo and Spencer encourage Maddy to go back home with Tanya and she agrees. However, when Tanya tries to send Maddy to boarding school in Melbourne, she returns to the Bay with Spencer. In 2015, Maddy asks Tanya to come to the Bay and after they catch up, she informs her mother that she has cancer. Tanya is angry with Roo for not telling her and asks Maddy to return home. After thinking things over, Maddy tells her mother that she wants to stay in the Bay. Tanya returns when Maddy has her arm amputated following an explosion. She asks her daughter to return to Sydney with her, so she can go to rehab. Tanya decides to sue Roo, after learning Roo blames herself for the incident, but later changes her mind. Tanya attends Maddy's farewell party, where she apologises to Roo. She later drives Maddy to the city.
22–25 February	Sheldon Atkinson	Laurence Coy	Celia Stewart holds Sheldon responsible for her gambling problem and she decides to contact him. When he turns in Summer Bay to see her, Celia's brother, Alf, is not happy. Both Celia and Sheldon claim that they are going to get help for their addiction. Alf gives Celia $7000, which he was guarding for her. Sheldon tries to convince Celia that they should use the money to bet on the horses, as he has a great tip. Celia admits that she loves Sheldon, but she cannot let him gamble her money away. Sheldon then leaves the Bay alone.
28 February–1 March	Ian Harrington	Matt Dale	Ian turns up at the Caravan Park and reveals to Roo Stewart that he is Spencer's father. He demands to see his son and starts shouting at Roo, until her husband, Harvey, intervenes and asks him to leave. The following day, Roo and Harvey tell Ian that Spencer and his girlfriend, Maddy, are going to stay with them. Ian demands that Spencer comes home, but Spencer refuses and says goodbye to his father. In 2015, Ian is injured in a car accident and Chris and Spencer visit him. Spencer mentioned that he's leaving the Bay, so he could help his mother to look after Ian.
13 March	Weight Lifter	Paul Davies	The weight lifter and treadmill guy are two customers at the gym who Heath Braxton gives instructions to on his first day working there.
13 March	Treadmill Guy	Rob Harys	The weight lifter and treadmill guy are two customers at the gym who Heath Braxton gives instructions to on his first day working there.
14 March	Aron Dawkin	Nicholas Cooper	Aron is one of Dexter Walker's lecturers at university. Dexter introduces himself to Aron prior to a lecture, having forgotten that they met the previous day. When Aron asks him a question during the lecture, Dexter is unable to recall the answer prompting Aron to remind the class of the importance of reading the specified texts.
14 March	Maureen Hogan	Melanie De Ferranti	Maureen is the mother of Tilda Hogan. Gina Palmer calls her into school to discuss Tilda's bullying of Jett James. Maureen replies that Tilda comes from a good family and Jett is a delinquent, refusing to believe that Tilda is a bully. Gina and her husband John later overhear Maureen loudly repeating the opinion to Tilda outside the surf club.
21 March	Brett Smith	Oliver Edwin	Brett is a classmate of April Scott from uni. April invites him to the Diner for a study session but he misunderstands and thinks they are on a date. When Dexter Walker, who knows Brett from chess club, arrives, Brett realizes April is the girl Dexter has told him about and quickly leaves, telling April they should pretend it never happened.
21 March	Robin Sutton	Phillipe Klaus	Robin is a counsellor, who meets with Heath Braxton and Bianca Scott. Heath is not happy with Robin's questions and quickly leaves, but he and Bianca later return.
25 March–25 April	Steph Green	Zara Michales	Steph is a nurse at the local hospital, who befriends Dexter Walker. When Dex plays a trick on Steph, she tells him to buy her a coffee to make it up to her. Dex confides in Steph about his brother-in-law's cancer diagnosis. April Scott sees Steph and Dex together and reveals that he has a brain injury, but Steph already knows. Dex later tells Steph that he does not want to be just friends with her and they kiss. The pair embark upon a relationship but Dexter learns Steph has been making up patients' obs figures. When she refuses to stop, he reports her and she is dismissed but retaliates by alerting their supervisor to the fact they had sex in a storage cupboard when they were supposed to be working.
25 March	Jake Twomey	Laurence Brewer	Jake is one of April Scott's lecturers at university. He is impressed when she speaks passionately of doctors' need to communicate effectively with patients' relatives during a discussion on bedside manner. Afterwards, they have lunch together.
25 March	Mr Andrews	Colin Huxley	Mr Andrews is a patient at the Northern District Hospital. He draws Dexter Walker's attention to the fact his drip has fallen out, prompting Dexter to summon Steph Green to correct it.
26 March–25 April	Alexander Mullens	Louis McIntosh	Rosie Prichard begins hanging out with Mullens and his friends. She and Mullens kiss in the Diner and Sasha Bezmel tries to intervene. Sasha later overhears Mullens bragging about taking advantage of Rosie and she sees that he has made a list of all the guys who have kissed Rosie and given her a score. Sasha asks Mullens to leave Rosie alone and tips a milkshake in his lap. Mullens later takes Rosie out in his car and while they are in the backseat of his car, Mullens rapes Rosie. He is questioned by the police but there is insufficient evidence to charge him. When he taunts Rosie at school and says that no-one will touch her now, Sasha punches him. Mullens reports Sasha assaulting him to the police. Tamara Kingsley hears what had happened, and attempts to confront him, but Kyle Braxton threatens Mullens into dropping an assault complaint against Sasha and moving school. Once being transferred, Mullens rapes Bella Lugarno, who tells Rosie and Sasha. After one of Mullens' friends, Lachlan Stone agrees to give evidence against him, Zac MacGuire reports that Mullens has been arrested and charged for sexual assault.
26 March–9 May	Lachlan Stone	Michael Windeyer	Lachlan is one of Alexander Mullens' friends. He expresses amusement when Sasha Bezmel insults Mullens. After Mullens has been accused of raping Rosie Prichard, Lachlan tries to stop him getting into an argument with her and Sasha at school. He begins watching Rosie but she runs off when he tries to talk to her. Zac MacGuire confronts him when he turns up at a self-defence class and Lachlan says he is not like Mullens. Zac visits him at the caravan park where he is staying with his father and he admits he wanted to convince himself Rosie was all right. He meets Rosie and Sasha at school, admitting he knows Mullens raped Rosie and Bella Lugarno, and reveals he has kept text messages in which Mullens admitted to the rape, agreeing to show them to the police.
4 April–24 September	Constable Taylor	Amy Scott-Smith	Constable Taylor is the police officer who takes Rosie Prichard's statement after she is raped by Alexander Mullens. She later arrests Sasha Bezmel after Mullens makes an assault complaint against her. She informs Zac MacGuire that his brother Ethan has taken out an AVO ordering Zac to stay away from his family and escorts Ethan's daughter Evelyn back to the lodge when she chooses to return to the cult.
24 April	Priest	Bruce Glen	The priest conducts Gina Palmer's funeral service.
25 April	Mr Thompson	Trevor Michel	Mr Thompson is a diabetic patient at the Northern District Hospital. Steph Green is assigned to look after him but Dexter Walker notices she is making up his obs figures.
30 April–1 May	Bella Lugarno	Hayley Mitchelhill-Miller	Bella attends a self-defence class run by Zac MacGuire and befriends Rosie Prichard. She later confesses that she was also raped by Alexander Mullens, but did not tell the police. She agrees to make a statement but is upset when the police are still unable to proceed with a case against Mullens.
8 May	Caleb Van Huessen	Miles Jovanoski	Caleb is a courier who Kyle Braxton collects a gun from on Ricky Sharpe's instructions. Ricky secretly photographs the exchange.
27 May–17 July	Holly Chapman	Sacha Vivian-Riding	Holly learns that Rosie Prichard is pregnant and comments that Rosie can hardly look after herself, let alone a child. Holly befriends Maddy Osborne and reveals that she has a crush on Zac MacGuire. She becomes jealous of Rosie receiving attention from Zac and continues to bully her. Holly's crush on Zac intensifies and she openly flirts with him, forcing Zac to tell her he was not interested. Holly behaviour continues and when she is confronted by Bianca Scott about a graphic essay she handed in to Zac, she admits that she has feelings for Zac and he feels the same way about her. Zac later finds a tearful Holly by the pier and comforts her. Holly tries to kiss Zac, who rejects her, and she reports him for sexual harassment. Holly later threatens to throw herself off a cliff, unless Zac declares his love for her. Zac manages to save Holly. Holly was then sent to hospital afterwards.
30 May–3 June	Henchman 1	James Willing	Two of Adam Sharpe's henchmen spy on the Braxtons and kidnap Tamara Kingsley. Two henchmen later bring Ricky Sharpe to the building where Tamara is being held.
30 May–3 June	Henchman 2	Mark Norton	Two of Adam Sharpe's henchmen spy on the Braxtons and kidnap Tamara Kingsley. Two henchmen later bring Ricky Sharpe to the building where Tamara is being held.
3 June	Joey Beresford	Cain Thompson	Joey is a long-term associate of Adam Sharpe who is assigned to guard Tamara Kingsley and Adam's sister Ricky. He lets Tamara know that Ricky is aware of who he works for and makes a pass at Ricky, saying the rules have changed now she is out of favour. Ricky rejects his advances but later flirts with and kisses him, only to knee him in the groin and run out of the building, although Joey grabs Tamara before she can follow. After the incident, Adam notes he has dispensed with Joey's services.
4 June	Henchman 3	Dusan Durdevic	Another of Adam Sharpe's henchman arrives with him at the house where Adam's sister Ricky is being held just as she runs outside shouting for help and quickly recaptures her.
4 June	Mr Silver	Robin Queree	Mr Silver is a patient at the Northern District Hospital with a badly gashed leg who Sid Walker looks after. Sid leaves April Scott to stitch the wound but Dexter Walker, checking Silver's notes and finding he is diabetic, gets her to take a full history from him beforehand.
7 June	Kerry Doyle	Clodagh Crowe	Kerry and her husband foster Rosie Prichard. Kerry is shocked to learn that Rosie is pregnant and is keeping the baby. She assumes that Rosie has a boyfriend or planned to have a child, until Bianca Scott tells her that the pregnancy is a result of sexual assault. Kerry then accompanies Rosie to her hospital appointment.
17 June	Nurse 1	Isabel Goudie	A nurse at the Northern District Hospital informs Sid Walker that theatre is ready after Darryl Braxton is brought in with gunshot wounds.
25 June	Andrea Marlowe	Ellen Bailey	Andrea is the journalist for the Coastal News who wrote the article accusing Zac MacGuire of sexual assault. She attends the protest Maddy Osborne organises to get Bianca Scott reinstated as Summer Bay High principal. She initially takes the angle of Bianca failing to control the students, but comments from Zac and John Palmer rallying the protesters convinces her to make it a positive article.
25 June	Photographer	Andy Trieu	The photographer joins Andrea Marlowe in covering the protest organised by Maddy Osborne to get Bianca Scott reinstated as Summer Bay High principal.
8 July–29 August	Nurse Liz	Kelly Robinson	This Northern District Hospital nurse looks after April Scott when she is bitten by a snake and informs Sid Walker that his son Dexter sent the ambulance to the wrong address. She later looks after Pippa Saunders after she has had a seizure. Peta Bradley tells her to look after Maddy Osborne after she has been in a car crash.
9 July	Intern	Irmgard Wessels	A staffmember at the Northern District Hospital where April Scott is treated for an allergic reaction to anti-venom.
10–11 July	Joanne Kingsley	Pippa Grandison	Casey Braxton contacts Tamara Kingsley's parents to tell them about their daughter's memory loss. They arrive in Summer Bay to see Tamara, but worry that she will not want to see them. Joanne and Patrick show Tamara pictures from the last time they were all together and then ask her to come home with them. She initially agrees but changes her mind at the last minute, not wanting to run from her problems, and says goodbye to them.
10–11 July	Patrick Kingsley	Jason Montgomery	Casey Braxton contacts Tamara Kingsley's parents to tell them about their daughter's memory loss. They arrive in Summer Bay to see Tamara, but worry that she will not want to see them. Joanne and Patrick show Tamara pictures from the last time they were all together and then ask her to come home with them. She initially agrees but changes her mind at the last minute, not wanting to run from her problems, and says goodbye to them.
18–22 July	Jerri Landale	Fely Irvine	Jerri is a process server who serves Darryl Braxton with the notification that he has been subpoenaed to testify against Ricky Sharpe. She later goes to the gym and serves a similar subpoena to Casey Braxton.
23 July	Peyton Tedd	Paige Houden	Peyton is a girl staying at the caravan park who goes to the gym for a workout. She flirts with Casey Braxton and invites him to join her and her friends for a drink. When he turns up, her friends have gone to the beach and she suggests they find something more interesting to do. She goes into her van and Casey follows her.
25 July	Franco Chilvers	Drayton Morley	Franco is Bianca Scott's supervisor who welcomes her to a principals' function at Angelo's. Bianca introduces him to Zac MacGuire, who he initially believes is her fiancé until Bianca corrects him. After going to find his wife, he announces it is time to eat.
30 July–9 October 2013	David Morrell	Charlton Hill	David is Ricky Sharpe's solicitor. He fails to reassure her and Darryl Braxton prior to her sentencing hearing when he observes that Ricky's brother Adam received a sentence of twenty-five years to life. He is present for the sentencing. He later represents Brax after he confesses to the manslaughter of Johnny Barrett and argues for mitigation, again being present at the sentencing.
1 August–26 September	Peta Bradley	Nadia Townsend	Peta is a doctor who begins work at the Northern Districts Hospital. She is initially unimpressed with medical student April Scott. She treats Casey Braxton after his alcohol poisoning and when he was in a car crash. She tells Brax about Casey's injuries. She is soon transferred and promises April that she will spend some time her family.
12 August	Hotel Maitre d'	Nick Mitchell	The maître d' of a Melbourne restaurant. When the Braxtons turn up, he denies that Kyle has made a reservation and claims there are no tables available.
13 August–20 March 2014	Jess Lockwood	Georgia Chara	Jess is a barmaid in a Melbourne night club. She allows Heath Braxton to use the bar phone to call his fiancée Bianca Scott. After Zac MacGuire answers and Heath assumes they are having an affair, Jess finds Heath in an alley outside the club and he kisses her. They then have a one-night stand. Months later, Jess comes to Summer Bay to inform Heath that she is pregnant. Jess gives birth to Harley on the beach with assistance from Heath and Nate Cooper. Jess later faints and tells Nate that she has stage 4 cancer, and will not live to see Harley's first birthday. A few weeks later, while Heath is looking after Harley, Jess dies.Heath drove to Melbourne with Harley to attend to Jess' funeral.
13 August	Paris Wells	Herself	Paris Wells performs in a Melbourne night club that Kyle Braxton takes his brothers to.
10 September–29 October	Murray Granger	Christopher Stollery	Murray is the leader of a cult called Sanctuary Lodge. He tries to prevent Evelyn and Oscar from leaving the camp with Zac MacGuire and Darryl Braxton. He later shows up in Summer Bay looking for the twins and he threatens to involve the police, until Oscar says he will tell the police about the beating he gave him. Evelyn later returns to the cult. Murray brings her back to the Bay to visit Oscar and he also baits Zac into becoming violent. Spencer Harrington comes to the Lodge to seek help for his bipolar disorder. After listening to Murray's ideologies, he decides that he wants to be a member. After Chris tried to bring Spencer back, he kicks Chris out. Later, Evelyn records incriminating evidence on Chris' phone about the discovery weekend and when Spencer refused to go further, Murray punches him in the face and takes him away to beat him up. Murray is later arrested by Emerson when Evelyn hands him the phone.
16 September	Physio 1	Brett Clancy	Physios at the Northern District Hospital where Casey Braxton is treated for spinal injuries.
17 September	Physio 2	Bronwyn Chilvers	Physios at the Northern District Hospital where Casey Braxton is treated for spinal injuries.
19 September–17 October	Robyn Sullivan	Alexandra Park	Robyn turns up in Summer Bay looking for her boyfriend, Chris Harrington. She reveals that she met Chris on holiday and is in town to win him back. She also has a one-night stand with Kyle Braxton.
30 September–9 October	Debbie Barrett	Olivia Pigeot	Debbie is Andy and Josh Barrett's mother. She helps Andy to hide after he runs Casey Braxton off the road and Darryl Braxton comes looking for him. Brax finds Debbie at an old house and Debbie tells Brax that her sons were hurt when their father Johnny left them after a botched robbery. Andy arrives and hits Brax, who then chases and catches him. Debbie defends Brax and then asks him if he knows where Johnny is, Brax says he does not. Just as Brax is about to enter the police van, Debbie steals Andy's gun and tries to shoot him, but as she fires, her son Josh is hit and she is arrested. A few weeks later, Andy came to visit her in jail.
2 October	Johnny Barrett	Stephen Anderton	Johnny was the father of Josh Barrett and stepfather of Andy, who is seen in flashback. He committed an armed robbery with Danny Braxton. After Danny was arrested, he went to the Braxtons' house demanding the money from the robbery and hit Casey. Brax met him and offered him a half share but Johnny wanted it all. Brax pushed him and caused him to fall and hit his head, killing him. It was later revealed that he was still breathing but Adam Sharpe later finished him off. His body was recovered and his personal effects are given to Josh where Brax later steals a ripped baby photo of Casey to show his mother. Cheryl confesses that Casey is Johnny's son, not Danny's.
14 October	Freya Lund	Ellie Gall	Freya is a member of Murray Granger's lodge. Murray points her out to Evelyn MacGuire as having been on a discovery weekend. When Evelyn asks her about it, Freya says it has to be approached with an open mind. When they speak in private later, however, Freya admits it was awful and tells Evelyn not to go on one.
