= Kassandra Clementi =

Australian actress (born 1990)

- Born: 10 October 1990 (age 36); Adelaide, South Australia
- Occupation: Actress
- Years active: 2009–present
- Notable work: Single Ladies; Home and Away
- Partner(s): Jacqueline Toboni (2019–2022); Daniel McKernan (engaged)
- Children: 1

Kassandra Clementi (born 10 October 1990) is an Australian actress. She is known for her role as Maddy Osborne on the Seven Network soap opera Home and Away, a role she played for over three years before leaving in May 2016.

== Early life ==
Clementi was born in Adelaide, South Australia and dreamed of becoming a vet when she was a child. She took acting classes as a teenager and decided to pursue that career direction after high school, moving away from Adelaide to study it further. As a child, Clementi would spend time on family holidays in the coastal town of Middleton in South Australia.

== Career ==
In 2009, Clementi appeared in a minor role in Australian/UK feature film The Boys Are Back, with Clive Owen. Clementi successfully began to receive roles in television series'. The first roles she received was that of 'Cara' in Offspring and 'Chelsea' in the television film Underbelly Files: Infiltration. Following her part in the film, she relocated to Atlanta, Georgia when she received yet another role in the American television series Single Ladies, with Queen Latifah, in which she played 'Christina' for six months.

In early 2012, Clementi travelled to Los Angeles to film the television film Christmas Twister (F6 Twister), which starred Casper Van Dien. Clementi also starred in the feature film Hatfields and McCoys: Bad Blood in 2012 alongside Christian Slater.

In 2012, Clementi received the role of Madeleine "Maddy" Osborne on the Seven Network soap opera Home and Away after auditioning because she was homesick and knew this opportunity would bring her back to Australia. The character of Maddy is a teenager who comes to Summer Bay with her boyfriend Spencer Harrington (Andrew Morley) after running away from home.

In 2017, Clementi joined the cast of UnReal and used an American accent for the part.

Clementi fronted the summer 2018/2019 campaign for lifestyle brand Sunnylife, that was shot in Northern Queensland.

In 2020, The Christmas High Note, a Lifetime Movie, was released with Clementi playing the part of Emma. During filming Clementi adopted a rescue dog.

== Personal life ==
In 2014, Clementi dated Australian veterinarian and TV personality, Dr. Chris Brown. Clementi resides in Los Angeles, USA.

On 18 August 2021, Clementi announced her engagement to actress Jacqueline Toboni. However, on 7 August 2022, Kassandra confirmed via an Instagram comment that she and Toboni had "separated awhile [sic] ago, amicably".

Clementi is in a relationship with Daniel McKernan of the Animal Planet series Saved by the Barn. On 28 November 2022, McKernan announced via social media that he and Clementi were expecting their first child. The couple's daughter was born in May 2023. Clementi confirmed in April 2024 that she and McKernan had been engaged for over a year.

== Filmography and Television ==
| Year | Title | Role | Notes |
|---|---|---|---|
| 2009 | The Boys Are Back | Beach Kid | |
| 2010 | Offspring | Cara | Episode: "Taking Charge" |
| 2011 | Underbelly Files: Infiltration | Chelsea McLaren | Television film |
| 2011 | Single Ladies | Christina Carter | 10 episodes |
| 2012 | Snow White and the Seven Movies | Sleeping Beauty | Short film |
| 2012 | Hatfields and McCoys: Bad Blood | Rosanna McCoy | |
| 2012 | Christmas Twister | Lexi | Television film (F6 Twister) |
| 2013–2016 | Home and Away | Maddy Osborne | Main role |
| 2016 | My Summer Prince | Lady Isabella | Hallmark Movie |
| 2016 | Becoming Bond | Belinda | documentary/drama |
| 2017 | Unreal | Crystal | |
| 2020 | Breach | Hayley | |
| 2020 | The Christmas High Note | Emma | Lifetime Movie |
| 2022 | From Scratch | Caroline | |
| TBA | Dwellers | Claire Kingsley | |
