= Andrew James Morley =

Australian actor

Andrew Morley
- Born: Andrew James Morley; 10 November 1989 (age 37); Melbourne, Victoria, Australia
- Occupations: Actor, television presenter
- Years active: 2010–present
- Spouse: Jay Haggar (m. 2018)
- Children: 1

Andrew James Morley (born 10 November 1989) is an Australian actor, known for his roles as Brandon Benedict in Lightning Point and Spencer Harrington in Home and Away. Following his departure from Home and Away in 2015, Morley worked as a presenter on Melbourne Weekender and joined the cast of Neighbours as Jack Callahan.

== Early and personal life ==
Morley was raised on a farm in Clarkefield, Victoria. He has an elder brother, Thomas and an elder sister, Alison. After graduating from high school, Morley studied civil engineering at RMIT University. Two years later, at the age of 20, he began acting and appeared in various short films.

Morley has been a volunteer firefighter since the early 2000s. Morley became engaged to his partner Jay Haggar in August 2017. Haggar gave birth to their first child, a daughter, on 14 December 2017. Morley is also a step-father to Haggar's two children from a previous relationship. Morley and Hagger married in December 2018.

== Career ==
In late 2010, Morley was cast as the lead role of Brandon Benedict in the Jonathan M. Shiff produced television series Lightning Point, which began airing from 2012. He had to relocate to the Gold Coast for the seven month shoot. In January 2013, Morley began appearing in Home and Away as Spencer Harrington. Morley left Home and Away in April 2015 after two years. A few months later, he joined the presenting team of travel and lifestyle show Melbourne Weekender.

In January 2016, it was announced that Morley had joined the regular cast of Neighbours as a character initially known as John Doe. He was billed as having no family ties and a "mysterious past". He made his first screen appearance on 4 April 2016. Morley's character was later revealed to be a Catholic priest called Jack Callahan. Morely left the show in 2018. He reprised the role for the show's 35th anniversary in March 2020.

After leaving Neighbours, Morley became a full-time firefighter. He also owns and co-runs the Store My Van caravan storage business with his mother.

== Filmography ==
Year	Title	Role	Notes
2011	Shepherd's Hill	Daylen	
2011	Ice	John Smith	
2012	Lightning Point	Brandon Benedict	
2013–2015	Home and Away	Spencer Harrington	Main cast
2015	Melbourne Weekender	Himself	Presenter
2016–2018, 2020	Neighbours	Jack Callahan	Main cast; 239 episodes
