= Tai Hara =

Australian actor (born 1990)

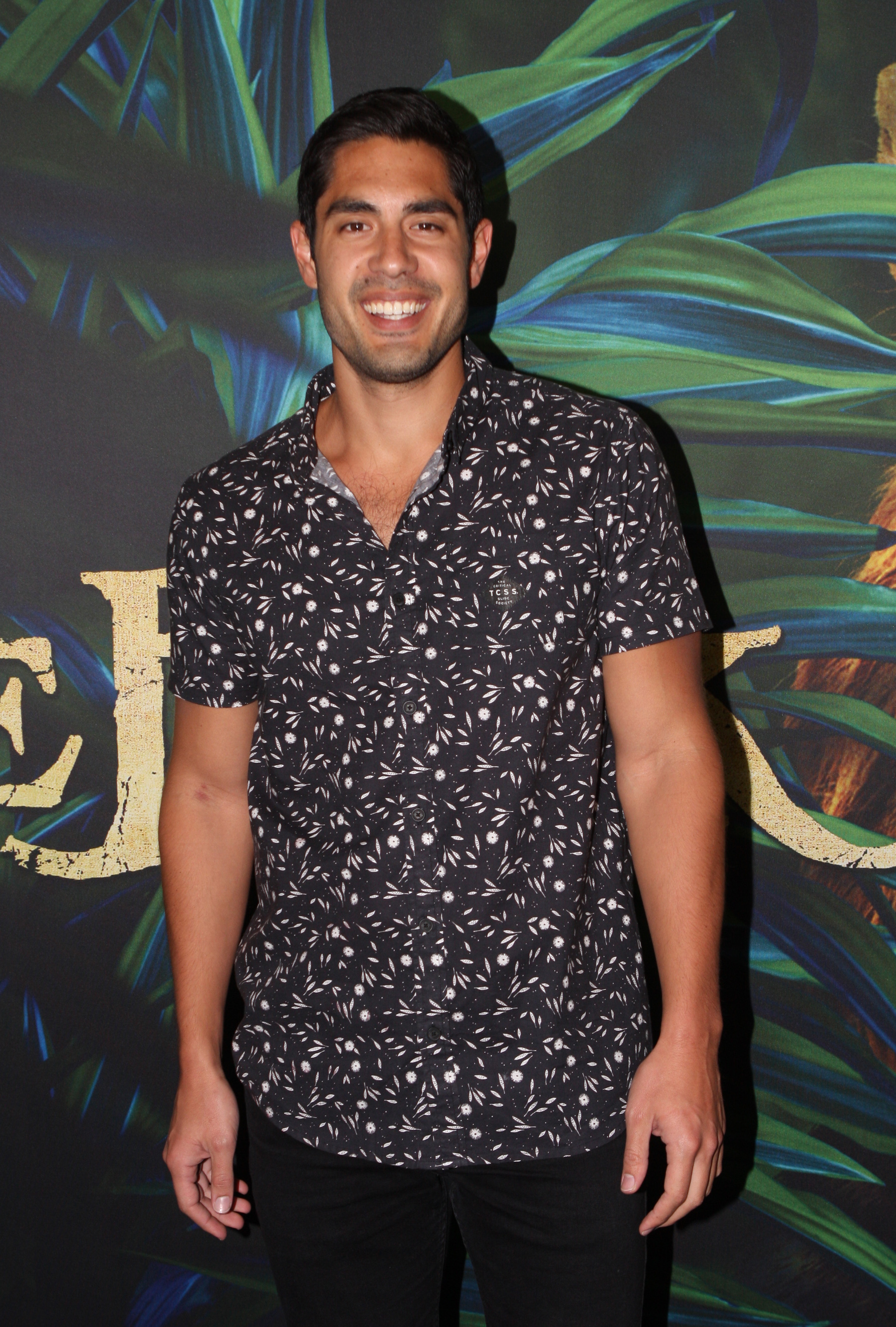
- Hara at The Jungle Book premiere at Event Cinema in Sydney, March 2016
- Born: 29 March 1990 (age 36); Sydney, Australia
- Occupations: Actor; Presenter; Filmmaker
- Years active: 2010–present
- Notable work: Home and Away (2013–16); Return to Paradise
- Height: 1.90 m (6 ft 3 in)
- Spouse: Fely Irvine (m. 2017)
- Children: 1

Tai Hara (born 29 March 1990) is an Australian actor, presenter and filmmaker.

== Early life and career ==
Hara was born in Sydney. He attended The Southport School on the Gold Coast, Queensland. before attending Queensland University of Technology where he graduated with a Bachelor of Fine Arts (Acting) in 2010. Following his graduation, Hara presented the television show Cash Call, which he hosted for two seasons.

Hara made his screen debut in 2011, appearing in a small role in a short-lived American science fiction drama Terra Nova. Hara is best known for his role on the Seven Network soap opera Home and Away, as Andy Barrett, from 2013 (the series' twenty-sixth season) until 2016. Hara has since appeared in Australian crime drama Hyde and Seek and the popular US series Madam Secretary and Preacher.

In 2014, Hara competed in the 14th series of Dancing with the Stars.

He created a web-series in 2020 called Colour Blind, a mockumentary about casting agents.

Hara in 2022 appeared in the first season of Colin from Accounts and in 2024 Hara was announced to return. Hara was also named as part of the support cast for ABC drama mystery series Return to Paradise.

On 17 April 2025, Hara would return for the filming for series two of Return to Paradise.

In June 2025, Hara was nominated for a Logie award for his work on the ABC series Return to Paradise.

== Personal life ==
Hara became engaged to Hi-5 cast member, Fely Irvine, in 2015, and the couple married in Bali in 2017. Their daughter was born in late 2020.

== Filmography ==
=== Television ===
Year	Title	Role	Notes
2011	Terra Nova	Compound Guard No. 1	2 episodes
2011–12	Cash Call	Himself	110 episodes
2013	Hi-5: Some Kind Of Wonderful	Himself	Documentary
2013–16	Home and Away	Andy Barrett	Series regular (268 episodes)
2016	Hyde and Seek	Detective Kevin Soga	Series regular
2017	SEAL Team	Anderson	1 episode
2019	Madam Secretary	David Akua	Guest
2019	Preacher	TV Anchor	2 episodes
2020	Bondi Slayer	Tom	1 episode
2022	Underbelly: Vanishing Act	Vincent Lee	2 episodes
2022-2026	Colin From Accounts	James	9 episodes
2024	Austin	Barman	4 episodes
2024–present	Return to Paradise	Glenn Strong	TV series: 18 episodes

=== Film ===
Year	Title	Role	Notes
2020	Colour Blind	Tai	
2018	Final Resting Pose	Henry	
2018	A Low Hum	Billy	
2012	Mourning After	Tai	Short film
2012	Reef 'n' Beef	Bass	Feature film
