= List of Home and Away characters introduced in 2012 =

Home and Away is an Australian television soap opera. It was first broadcast on the Seven Network on 17 January 1988. The following is a list of characters that first appeared in 2012, by order of first appearance. The 25th season of Home and Away began airing from 23 January 2012. Until mid-April, characters are introduced by the soap's executive producer, Cameron Welsh. Thereafter, they are introduced by his successor, Lucy Addario. January also saw Peter Phelps debut as Alan Henderson. Henrietta Brown arrived in February, while Christy Clarke began appearing from March. Melissa Gregg and Lottie Ryan made their first appearances in April. Jett James, Natalie Davison and Danny Braxton made their debuts in May. Kyle Bennett and Tim Graham arrived in August, while Tamara Kingsley, Lisa Flemming, Adam Sharpe and his son, Jamie Sharpe, began appearing from October.

== Alan Henderson ==
Alan Henderson
- Home and Away character
- Portrayed by: Peter Phelps
- First appearance: 23 January 2012
- Last appearance: 13 April 2012
- Introduced by: Cameron Welsh
In-universe information
- Wife: Margaret Henderson
- Sons: Stu Henderson

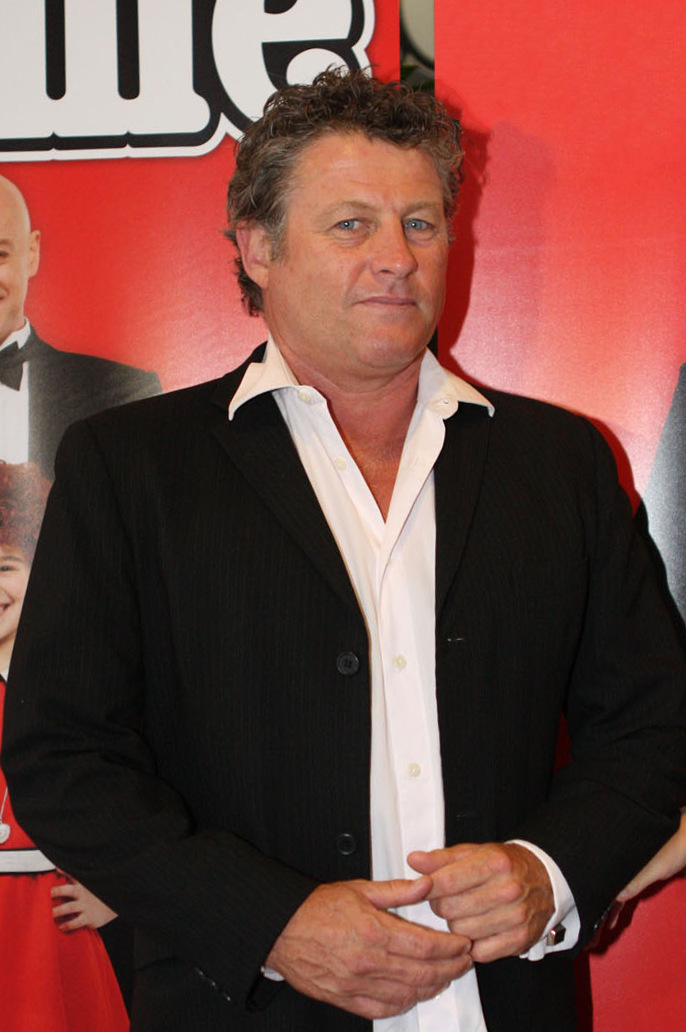
Peter Phelps played Alan Henderson

Alan Henderson, played by Peter Phelps, made his first on screen appearance on 23 January 2012. The character and casting was announced on 22 December 2011. Alan is the father of Stu Henderson (Brenton Thwaites). Phelps was reunited with Robert Mammone (Sid Walker), who he previously worked with on Stingers. Mammone said "Peter and I have known each other for 20 years. It's like a school reunion when you work with actors that you've worked with before for a long time. It's been lots of fun."

Alan is visiting his son in the hospital, when he runs into Sid Walker, the man who beat Stu up for physically abusing his daughter. Alan confronts Sid and threatens to beat him up. Sid apologises and tells Alan that there has been too much violence already. Alan agrees and walks away. Alan later confronts Sasha Bezmel (Demi Harman) about sending naked pictures to boys and her accusations against Stu. Sid drags Alan away and they have a physical confrontation. Alan comes to the Walker's home and offers Sid a deal; drop the charges against Stu or have the police arrest him for assaulting him at the hospital. Alan later catches Stu with Sasha and he hits his son. When Stu is found dead, Alan is questioned by the police over his behaviour towards his son. Alan tells them to ask Dexter Walker (Charles Cottier) and Xavier Austin (David Jones-Roberts) about Stu, as they were looking for him shortly before he died. Alan and his wife Margaret (Susan Prior) attend a memorial service for Stu at the school. Alan goes to Angelo's for a drink and he collapses in front on Sid. Alan is taken to the hospital and Sid gets his heart restarted. Alan tells Dexter that he has regrets and later takes back his complaint against Sid, allowing him to get his job back. Alan collapses again and is brought into the hospital. Sid believes Alan's medication may be wrong and gains permission from him to go to his house and look at it. Sid later realises Margaret has been poisoning Alan and she is arrested. When Alan learns of the news he decides to leave the hospital and knocks over a nurse when she tries to stop him. Alan attends Sasha's court hearing and is angry when she is found not guilty.

== Henrietta Brown ==
Henrietta Brown
- Home and Away character
- Portrayed by: Emma Leonard
- First appearance: 6 February 2012
- Last appearance: 2 May 2012
- Introduced by: Cameron Welsh
In-universe information
- Occupation: English teacher
- Mother: Margi Sloane

Henrietta "Henri" Brown, played by Emma Leonard, made her first on screen appearance on 6 February 2012. Henri is a substitute teacher, who gets a job at Summer Bay High. She is also Heath Braxton's (Dan Ewing) ex-girlfriend. In late January 2012, it was announced an "old flame" of Heath's would arrive in the Bay and cause April Scott (Rhiannon Fish) to fear she will lose him. Of this, the show's new series producer Lucy Addario said "There's a juicy love triangle [coming up] between April, Heath and a gorgeous woman from Heath's past." Daniel Kilkelly of Digital Spy said Henri "soon starts trying to rekindle her connection with Heath." Sarah Morgan of the Daily Record said "Henri is an odd name for a woman, but she certainly knows how to turn men's heads – especially Heath's." Henri later becomes attracted to her student, and Heath's brother, Casey (Lincoln Younes). Henri and Casey kiss twice, which leaves the audience wondering whether "a full-blown teacher-pupil relationship" could be about to happen. Younes said he was "worried and excited" about the controversial storyline and added "I think for the moment, it's going to be that playful, dangerous line between risk-taking and the possible repercussions that could come. Right now, it's hard to say where this will go." A writer from TV Buzz said that "Henri may be an excellent teacher, but were not sure she should be tutoring young Casey in lessons of love."

Gina Austin (Sonia Todd) hires Henri as a substitute English teacher for Summer Bay High. Henri reveals she used to attend the school when she was younger. Henri befriends Bianca Scott (Lisa Gormley) and reconnects with Heath Braxton. She later asks him out for a drink. Henri turns up at Heath's on the day of Bianca's wedding with beers. They talk about their past, but are interrupted by April Scott. Henri realises Heath has been dating April. Henri attends a cage fight and runs into Heath. She later tells April about it. Henri comes to Bianca and tells her April failed to do something for an assignment due to her boyfriend. April becomes upset with Henri when she receives a bad mark and accuses her of being jealous of her and Heath. Casey Braxton (Lincoln Younes) confides in Henri about an incident that he was involved in while in juvenile detention. Heath comes to Henri after an argument with April and they have sex. Heath asks Henri to keep their one-night stand quiet and Henri later gives April a good mark in class. Heath confronts Henri, but she tells him she is not playing games. Henri pursues Heath and books a room for them at a motel. However, April finds the details of the booking and shows up thinking the room is for her and Heath. Henri reveals her affair with Heath to April and later, Bianca. Henri decides to break things off with Heath. When Casey learns of Henri's affair with Heath, he confronts her. She becomes upset and later tells Casey she cannot tutor him any more. Henri assures him that she does not have feelings for Heath and they kiss. Casey tells Gina that he wants to quit school and she asks Henri to talk to him. Henri agrees to resume tutoring Casey and they begin a relationship in secret.

== Christy Clarke ==
Christy Clarke
- Home and Away character
- Portrayed by: Isabelle Cornish
- First appearance: 6 March 2012
- Last appearance: 12 April 2012
- Introduced by: Cameron Welsh
In-universe information
- Occupation: Student

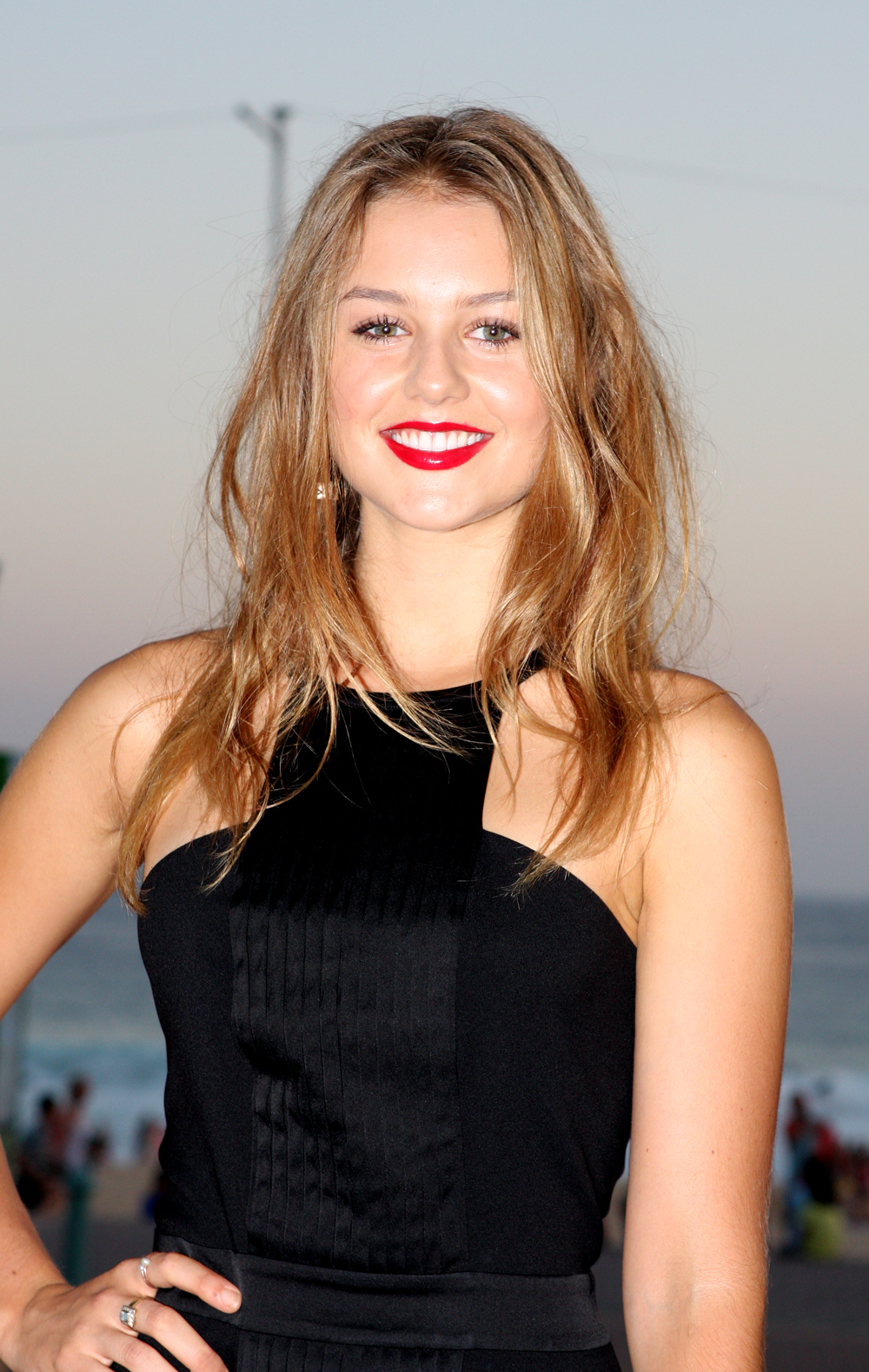
Isabelle Cornish played Christy Clarke

Christy Clarke, played by Isabelle Cornish, made her debut screen appearance on 6 March 2012. The character and Cornish's casting was announced in late February 2012. The actress has an extended guest role with the show. Cornish initially auditioned for the role of Sasha Bezmel, however, it was actress Demi Harman who was eventually cast.

Of her character and casting, Cornish told Richard Clune of The Daily Telegraph "I get to play the bad girl Christy, the new girl who comes in and causes some trouble. She's so mean, it was so much fun to play." The actress described her character as "flawlessly groomed, popular and demanding attention." A writer for TV Week revealed Christy is involved with one of the show's biggest 2012 storylines – who killed Stu Henderson (Brenton Thwaites)? Cornish explained that Christy was good friends with Stu and she had a crush on him. When she learns he is dead, she becomes upset and then determined to find out who is responsible. Christy turns to Stu's ex-girlfriend, Sasha, and she lashes out at her. Cornish revealed "Christy doesn't like Sasha. Her aim is to destroy her. She tries to get rid of her friends, bully her and make her uncomfortable." The actress added that she had to make herself believe Sasha was a bad person and that she wanted to make her feel unhappy.

Christy starts bullying Sasha Bezmel after it is revealed she accidentally killed Stu Henderson. Christy manages to convince Alicia Spears (Chelsea Giles) to reject Sasha's friendship. Christy kicks Sasha during break and pretends it was an accident in front of Gina Austin (Sonia Todd). Christy and her friends start sending Sasha hate emails and she tells Sasha to stay away from school. While Sasha is leaving the beach by herself, Christy and her friends beat her up. Sasha tells Gina that Christy has been bullying her and Gina finds a video of Christy beating Sasha up. She then expels Christy from the school. Christy later testifies and provokes Sasha at her murder trial

== Melissa Gregg ==
Melissa Gregg
- Home and Away character
- Portrayed by: Allison Cratchley
- First appearance: 13 April 2012
- Last appearance: 11 September 2012
- Introduced by: Cameron Welsh
In-universe information
- Occupation: Doctor
- Husband: Harvey Ryan (until 2010)
- Sons: Ben Ryan
- Daughters: Lottie Ryan

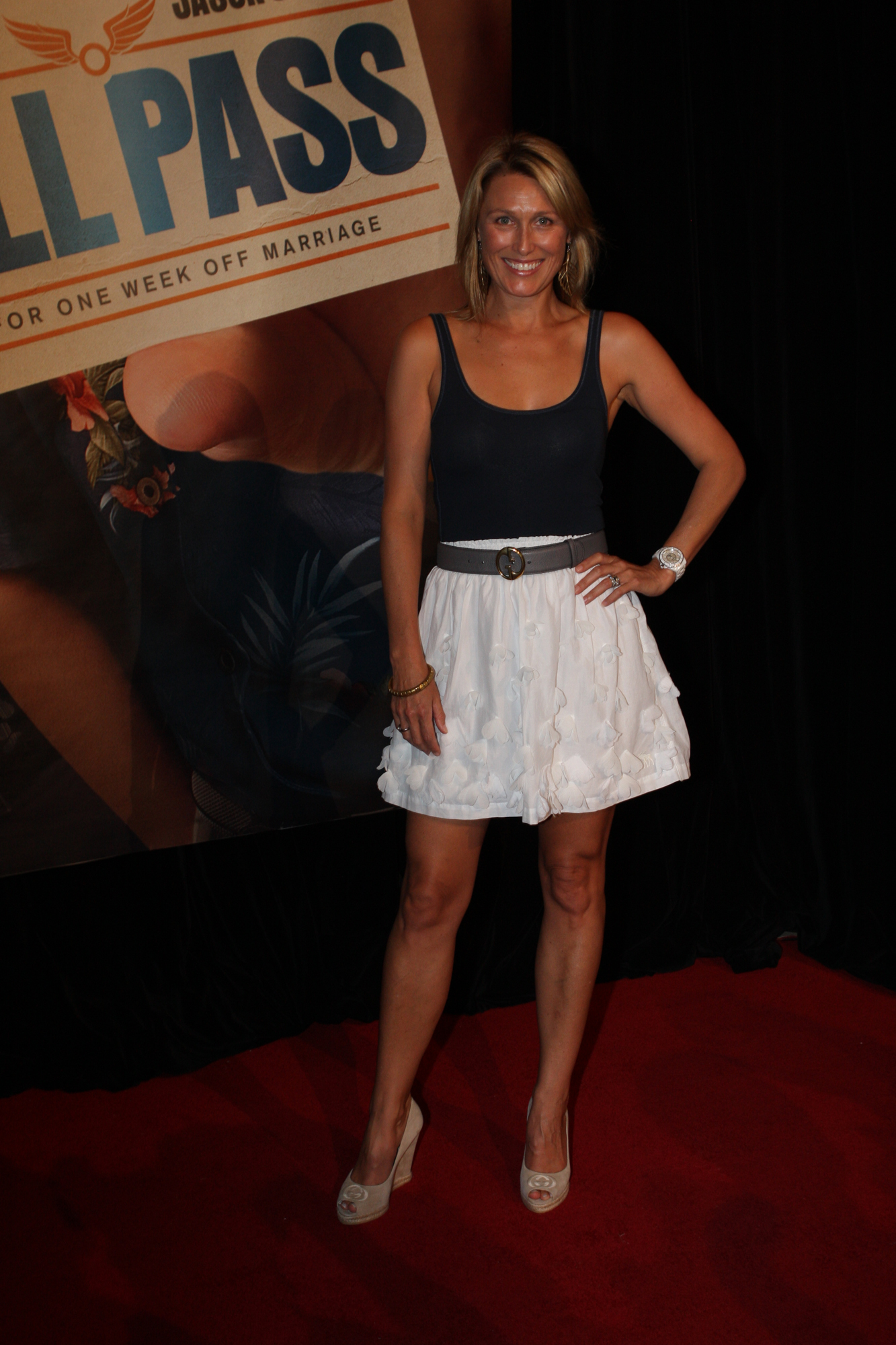
Allison Cratchley played Melissa Gregg.

Melissa "Mel" Gregg, played by Allison Cratchley, made her debut screen appearance on 13 April 2012. The character and Cratchley's casting was announced on 31 March 2012. Mel is a doctor and the ex-wife of Harvey Ryan (Marcus Graham). Of her character, Cratchley said "She had the break-up with Marcus's character and then they separated and she went to the city with another man and their daughter, Lottie, played by Morgan Weaving. But then that relationship breaks down, and since Mel's parents live in Summer Bay, she comes back for a bit of support." Cratchley told a reporter for TV Week that sparks fly between Mel and Harvey's girlfriend, Roo Stewart (Georgie Parker). She added that there would be tension between the two women and that Mel is a single mother who is "trying to keep her head above water and projecting stuff on to [Roo]." The reporter said Summer Bay would get "a shake-up" when Mel arrives. Mel later has a one-night stand with Harvey and Graham stated "Mel has always had unresolved feelings for him and I think she sees an opportunity and takes it."

Melissa goes to the Summer Bay Caravan Park to have her hair done by Marilyn Chambers (Emily Symons). While they are chatting, Melissa tells Marilyn about her ex-husband, Harvey, and Marilyn reveals she knows him and that he is currently in the hospital. Melissa visits Harvey and explains she broke up with her boyfriend and she and their daughter need his house to live in. Melissa gets a job at the hospital and she goes out for dinner with Sid Walker (Robert Mammone), her new colleague. During her shift at the hospital, a life-threatening car accident comes in and Mel states that she cannot face it. She later reveals to Harvey that she is struggling to cope with their son, Ben's, death. Mel become angry with Harvey when their finances fall into disarray and he has to sell their house. When Lottie comes to her to talk about her relationship issues, Mel snaps at her and Lottie moves in with Harvey. Mel struggles at work and freezes while treating a baby, Sid sends her home. Mel attacks Harvey and his girlfriend, Roo Stewart (Georgie Parker), accuses her of not being there for Lottie. Mel admits that she cannot cope and decides to seek treatment in the city. When Mel returns, she and Harvey start fighting for custody of Lottie. Mel threatens to reveal the truth about Ben's death and Harvey backs down. Roo later goes to see Mel and she explains that Harvey was drunk when Ben died during a boating accident. Lottie tells Mel that she wants to stay in Summer Bay, but when she realises that Mel will be alone in the city, she changes her mind. A few weeks later, Harvey turns up on Mel's doorstep and reveals that his relationship with Roo is over.

== Lottie Ryan ==
Lottie Ryan
- Home and Away character
- Portrayed by: Morgan Weaving
- First appearance: 16 April 2012
- Last appearance: 11 September 2012
- Introduced by: Lucy Addario
In-universe information
- Occupation: Student
- Father: Harvey Ryan
- Mother: Melissa Gregg
- Brothers: Ben Ryan

Charlotte "Lottie" Ryan, played by Morgan Weaving, made her first screen appearance on 16 April 2012. The character and casting was announced on 31 March 2012. Weaving is the younger sister of Samara Weaving who plays Indigo Walker in the soap. She relocated to Sydney in October 2011 for filming and she revealed "It's nice to be in the same city as Sam and work is an added bonus." Lottie is the daughter of Melissa Gregg (Allison Cratchley) and Harvey Ryan (Marcus Graham). After Melissa broke up with Harvey, she took Lottie to the city where they lived with another man. After that relationship ends, Melissa and Lottie arrive in Summer Bay. Describing her character, Weaving said "she's good fun, a sweet nerd who speaks her mind". On 22 April 2012, Richard Clune of The Daily Telegraph reported Weaving's "escapades as Lottie" would start to gain momentum from that week on.

Harvey meets with Lottie and Mel in Angelo's restaurant in Summer Bay and he apologises for not being there for her. Mel reveals Harvey has a girlfriend and Lottie realises he has not told her about his family. Lottie spends the day with Harvey and Roo Stewart (Georgie Parker) and she is given a new phone. She meets Dexter Walker (Charles Cottier) in The Diner and they play chess together. Lottie wins his money and gives it to Harvey for the phone, so her mother will not continue to be angry with him. Lottie asks Dex if he will be her tutor and he accepts, but he has to cancel their lunch time meeting to comfort April Scott (Rhiannon Fish). Lottie tells Dex about her younger brother's death and he helps her out with her science assignment. She later moves to the city with her mother.

== Jett James ==
Jett James, played by Will McDonald, made his first screen appearance on 7 May 2012. The character and casting was announced in April 2012. McDonald told Andrew Mercado of TV Week that he was "stunned" to get the role of Jett. He explained "I was speechless at first. I honestly thought I was in a dream, and then as reality faded in I realised this was really happening." The character of Jett is McDonald's first television role. Jett arrives in Summer Bay and "wastes no time in ruffling a few feathers", especially those of VJ Patterson (Felix Dean). McDonald described his character as "a delinquent who comes to the Bay and causes a bit of trouble and gets on some people's bad sides." While a writer for Channel 5 said Jett has "a knack for causing trouble". In 2013, McDonald received a nomination for the Most Popular New Male Talent Logie Award.

== Natalie Davison ==
Natalie Davison
- Home and Away character
- Portrayed by: Catherine Mack
- Duration: 2012–2013
- First appearance: 16 May 2012
- Last appearance: 9 July 2013
- Introduced by: Lucy Addario
In-universe information
- Occupation: Counsellor

Natalie Davison, played by Catherine Mack, made her first appearance on 16 May 2012. The character and casting was announced on 6 May 2012. Mack revealed to Luke Dennehy of the Herald Sun that the role of Natalie "came out of the blue". She explained "I was settled in Los Angeles and when they asked me to send an audition tape, I didn't think much of it. In January I got a call from my agent in Australia and he said 'come back straight away'. I didn't pack anything up because I thought it would be a quick trip." The actress called the role her dream job and said she had always wanted to live in Sydney, where the show is filmed. Natalie is a school counsellor, who helps Sasha Bezmel (Demi Harman) and Casey Braxton (Lincoln Younes). A writer for Channel 5 said she would "have her work cut out for her" due to the amount of teen drama in Summer Bay. Mack said that while Natalie initially appears in her "professional capacity", viewers would slowly start to see aspects of her private life. She told Colin Vickery of The Advertiser: "She hasn't had a whole lot of experience in her field but her work is her life."

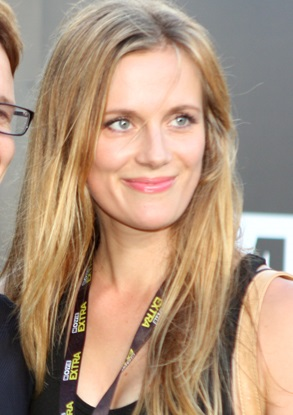
Catherine Mack plays Natalie Davison

Mack described her character as having "a very selfless quality and determination to help others that I really admire." She stated that Natalie "is passionate and strong", but she does have flaws, adding that Natalie went through some tough times as a teenager, which forced her to grow up quickly. When asked if Natalie interacts with the Braxton brothers, Dan Ewing (who plays Heath Braxton) quipped to a TV Week writer that she has "no direct cuddles" with his character. In June 2012, it was revealed Natalie would become Darryl Braxton's (Steve Peacocke) love interest. Mack said Natalie finds Brax interesting and she is trying to work out who he is and what he is about. Natalie tries to help Casey after he shoots his father dead, which complicates the romance between herself and Brax. She thought the relationship allowed for the chance to show a new side of Brax. She explained "There are a few dark twists and turns that come up that make Brax not have that flirty relationship he had with (former girlfriend) Charlie (Esther Anderson). They're thrown together."

In 2013, Mack received a nomination for the Most Popular New Female Talent Logie Award. In June that year it was announced that Mack had decided to leave Home and Away and that she had already filmed her final scenes. The actress told a TV Week reporter "It was time for Natalie to leave the Bay, as she had some unfinished business with her family to attend to. She really needed to move forward with her life." Mack added that she had enjoyed her experience on the show and was looking forward to the future.

Natalie moves into her new office at Summer Bay High and meets with Sasha Bezmel. Natalie also starts counselling sessions with Casey Braxton, who opens up to her about his father. She tells him to meet his father if he wants to, but his brother, Brax, asks Natalie not to interfere in their lives. Natalie grows concerned for Casey when his father, Danny (Andy McPhee), is released from prison. Natalie grows closer to Brax, prompting him to tell her about Danny's violent past. Natalie and Brax have a one-night stand. Jett James' (Will McDonald) foster mother, Gina Austin (Sonia Todd), asks Natalie to counsel him after his biological father rejects him. However, Natalie realises that she cannot counsel Jett without his full co-operation and consent. Brax becomes worried when Casey spends more time Danny and they disappear from the Bay. He and Natalie learn that Danny is planning to rob a local bar and they go to find Casey. Shortly after getting to the bar, they hear a shot and find Casey has shot Danny. Natalie tries to help Danny, but he later dies. Natalie becomes friends with Bianca Scott (Lisa Gormley). Natalie and Brax notice that Casey is acting strange and they agree to put their relationship on hold to help him. Brax goes on a camping trip with Casey, who later goes missing. Brax and Natalie learn that he has been taken to the desert and they try and track him down. Natalie and Brax find Casey and he tells them about a mysterious girl named Tamara Kingsley (Kelly Paterniti) who helped him. Natalie initially thinks Casey was hallucinating. Back home, Natalie learns that she must make a statement at Casey's court case. Natalie's testimony is considered questionable and Casey is told that he must check into a detention centre each weekend. Natalie asks Zac MacGuire (Charlie Clausen) to watch over Casey in prison and Brax thanks her. Brax later breaks up with Natalie. She grows closer to Zac and they start dating, however, Zac becomes annoyed with her constant dealings with the Braxtons. Natalie and Brax continue to argue and they eventually confess their love for one another, but she decides to stay with Zac. Zac later tells Natalie to choose between himself or the Braxtons and she distances herself from them. After Brax is shot by Adam Sharpe (Martin Lynes), Natalie becomes concerned for his welfare. Zac accuses Natalie of still being in love with Brax and she admits that he is right and that she is not over Brax. Zac and Natalie break up and Zac realizes that the reason Natalie clung to the Braxtons was due to her trying to fill a void in her life caused by her mother leaving her as a child. Zac resolves to help Natalie overcome her issues and when he discovers that Natalie's mother is still alive, Natalie then leaves the Bay to go and find her.

== Danny Braxton ==
Danny Braxton
- Home and Away character
- Portrayed by: Andy McPhee
- First appearance: 30 May 2012
- Last appearance: 17 August 2012
- Introduced by: Lucy Addario
In-universe information
- Wife: Cheryl Braxton (divorced)
- Sons: Darryl Braxton; Heath Braxton; Kyle Braxton
- Grandsons: Rocco Scott-Braxton; Harley Lockwood; Casey Braxton
- Granddaughters: Darcy Callahan

Daniel "Danny" Braxton, played by Andy McPhee, made his debut screen appearance on 30 May 2012. The character was announced on 14 May 2012, while McPhee's casting was revealed in January 2012. He began filming in the same month and had a six-month guest contract with the show. Danny is the father of Darryl (Steve Peacocke), Heath (Dan Ewing) and Casey Braxton (Lincoln Younes). A reporter for The West Australian commented "If you thought Home and Away's River Boys were tough, wait until you meet their dad." A TV Week writer stated details about the Braxton's brothers' father "have been few and far between" since their arrival, but that would all change when Heath visits Danny in prison. Ewing explained that after Heath's son is born, he realises he has a lot of questions about his father and why he left the family. He wants to make peace with Danny, so he will feel like a better father towards his son. The TV Week writer explained that there is not a happy family reunion, with Danny's desertion and his criminal past still sore points for Heath. Ewing told the writer "Heath definitely resents his father mainly because he idolised him so much when he was a young teenager. So it's pretty icy and there's a lot of pent-up anguish and emotion." Danny surprises Heath by admitting that he regrets a lot of the things he did in the past, like throwing his family away. Roz Laws from the Sunday Mercury called Danny a "deadbeat dad".

Heath visits Danny in jail and receives an icy reception from him. They eventually relax into conversation and Danny reveals that he has regrets about letting his family go. Brax also visits Danny and realises he has not changed. He tells his father to give up his dream of freedom and Danny reveals that he was not aware Heath is trying to get him out. Brax later returns to the jail with Casey and Heath begins an appeal to free Danny. Danny attends his court hearing and is later freed. He turns up in Summer Bay and Brax allows him to spend the night at his house. Danny later moves into the caravan park and befriends Marilyn Chambers (Emily Symons). Danny tells Brax that he wants his money back and starts playing games with him. Danny invites Marilyn out to dinner, while some guys that he hired knock Brax out and leave him in the bush. When Casey confronts his father, Danny manages to lie his way out of it. Danny hints to Brax that he is going to get his money back from his ex-wife, Cheryl, and Casey becomes aware of Danny's darker side. Danny learns that Ruby Buckton (Rebecca Breeds) has a lot of money and he befriends her, hoping to scam her out of the money. When Heath tells Danny about his son's progress in hospital, Danny does not seem to care. Heath confronts him and Danny lashes out, making Heath realise that he has not changed.

Brax tells Danny to leave Casey alone, but he refuses. Danny is visited by Kyle Bennett (Nicholas Westaway), who gives him a gun and a fake passport. Danny learns that Casey has double crossed him, when Ruby moves into Summer Bay House. Danny attacks Casey, but he pretends to still be on his side. Casey accompanies his father to a motel and Danny robs the bar. They are caught by the owner and Danny pulls out his gun, forcing the owner to open the safe. Danny realises Casey is on Brax's side and asks him to shoot the owner. Casey refuses and shoots Danny instead. Danny is rushed to hospital, but dies in surgery.

== Kyle Braxton ==
Kyle Braxton, played by Nic Westaway, made his first screen appearance on 8 August 2012. The character and casting was announced on 28 June 2012. Digital Spy's Daniel Kilkelly reported that Lincoln Younes had been tweeting about Westaway joining the cast and revealed that he had been listed as a Home and Away series regular on his agency profile. He added "The page names his character as Kyle Braxton, so it seems that recent arrival Danny won't be the last addition to the family!" In September, Kyle kidnaps Casey Braxton (Younes) and holds him hostage in the desert. Younes told TV Week's Erin Miller "There has certainly been someone watching him for few weeks, which you've seen snippets of, and the inference is that it's related to his dad." Kyle eventually reveals that he is Danny Braxton's (Andy McPhee) son.

== Tim Graham ==
Tim Graham
- Home and Away character
- Portrayed by: Jonny Pasvolsky
- First appearance: 17 August 2012
- Last appearance: 7 September 2012
- Introduced by: Lucy Addario
In-universe information
- Occupation: Businessman

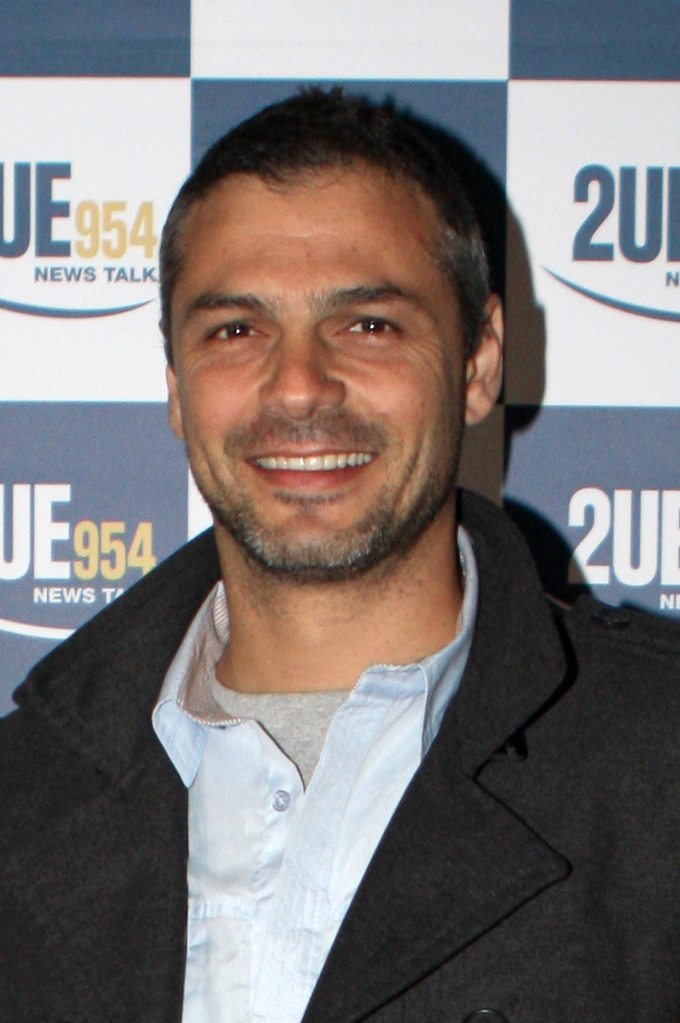
Jonny Pasvolsky played Tim Graham.

Tim Graham, played by Jonny Pasvolsky, made his first screen appearance on 17 August 2012. The character and Pasvolsky's casting was announced on 6 August 2012. Tim is Roo Stewart's (Georgie Parker) ex-boyfriend, who turns up unexpectedly in Summer Bay shortly after she has got engaged to Harvey Ryan (Marcus Graham). Roo and Tim dated while she lived in New York, but the relationship "soured" before her return to Australia.

Of Tim and Roo, Pasvolsky explained "He was married and had an affair with her – he was completely in love with her – but chose in the end to go back to his wife. And then, subsequently, that's fallen through and he's realised that Roo was the love of his life." Tim tries to win Roo back and he does not take no for an answer. He also has "a few tricks up his sleeve" to help him. Pasvolsky described Tim as being suave and well dressed, adding that he has a "New York energy" about him.

== Tamara Kingsley ==
Tamara Jane Kingsley, played by Kelly Paterniti, made her first screen appearance on 1 October 2012 and departed on 21 May 2014. Paterniti relocated from West Australia to Sydney for filming. She revealed that she was initially nervous about joining Home and Away, saying "There is the fear that at some point you are going to be in a bikini, and that did play on my mind. You can't obsess over it, though. I think once you rip the bandaid off, it's fine."

Tamara became involved in a love triangle with Casey Braxton (Lincoln Younes) and Sasha Bezmel (Demi Harman) in late 2012. Paterniti revealed that things would become more complicated for the trio in 2013. Tamara feels that she has an instant connection to Casey, especially because she helped him out when he was in "a really vulnerable state". Tamara's ex-boyfriend, Nelson (Anthony Gee), arrives in Summer Bay and Paterniti revealed that Tamara was involved in "a fairly abusive relationship" with him.

== Lisa Flemming ==
Lisa Flemming
- Home and Away character
- Portrayed by: Rachael Beck
- First appearance: 5 October 2012
- Last appearance: 22 November 2012
- Introduced by: Lucy Addario
In-universe information
- Occupation: Physiotherapist
- Husband: Neil Flemming

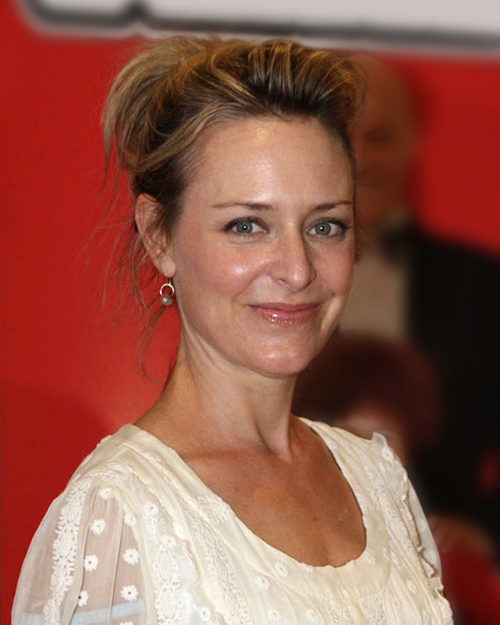
Rachael Beck plays Lisa Flemming

Lisa Flemming, played by Rachael Beck, made her first screen appearance on 5 October 2012 and 22 November 2012. The character and casting was announced on 3 September 2012. Lisa is a physiotherapist who helps Dexter Walker (Charles Cottier) with his recovery following his involvement in a car crash. A writer for the official Home and Away website stated "She has a few surprises in her storyline which cause a certain doctor to do some soul searching." It was later revealed that Lisa would be a love interest for Dex's father, Sid (Robert Mammone). Sid hits it off with Lisa and he admires her positivity and her "can-do attitude." Lisa meets with Sid for lunch to discuss Dex, but sparks begin flying and they later share a kiss in the back of Sid's car. Mammone stated "The chemistry is obvious between these two, but it's complicated."

Sid Walker meets up with Lisa to discuss his son, Dex's, physiotherapy. They begin flirting over lunch and start kissing in the back of Sid's car. When Dex starts to feel like a burden, Lisa talks to him and make him see that he can be useful. Sid tells Lisa that what happened between them was a mistake and it cannot happen again. However, he later apologises and asks to keep seeing her. Sid and Lisa decide to keep their relationship a secret, but Dex notices them together and reveals that Lisa is married. Sid confronts her and she reveals that she is separated from her husband, Neil (Josef Ber), but he does stay over at their house occasionally. Sid allows Lisa to continue with Dex's treatment and they start their relationship over in secret. However, when Dex finds out about it and becomes angry, Sid breaks up with Lisa. Dex later invites Lisa to Indigo (Samara Weaving) and Romeo Smith's (Luke Mitchell) wedding and she tells Sid that her husband will not let her go.

Lisa announces that she is going to leave Neil. During a training session with Dex, Lisa takes a call and does not notice him falling over. Angry with Lisa, Sid goes to her house where Neil informs him that she is not home. Neil then confronts Lisa about her relationship with Sid, but she denies that anything has happened. Lisa later comes to the Walker's home with a bruised face. Lisa tells Sid that Neil has been physically abusing her for a few years. Sid lets her stay the night and when they go to collect her things, they find Neil has changed the locks. Lisa later tells Neil that she wants to leave and takes out an AVO against him. Sid is later attacked by Neil. When Lisa learns that Neil came to the Walker's house, she is upset at the thought of Sid's family being involved in her problems. Neil threatens Indi when he cannot find Lisa and is arrested. When he is released, Lisa calls him. She then tells Sid that she is returning to Neil, so he will not take his anger out on Sid's family any more. Lisa explains that she will then leave him for good, before saying goodbye to Sid.

== Adam Sharpe ==
Adam Sharpe
- Home and Away character
- Portrayed by: Martin Lynes
- Duration: 2012–2014
- First appearance: 16 October 2012
- Last appearance: 5 March 2014
- Introduced by: Lucy Addario
In-universe information
- Occupation: Businessman
- Sisters: Ricky Sharpe
- Sons: Jamie Sharpe
- Nephews: Casey Braxton

Adam Sharpe, played by Martin Lynes, made his first screen appearance on 16 October 2012. Dan Ewing teased Adam's arrival, saying that he is one of the "worst guys" from the Braxton family's past. While Darryl Braxton (Steve Peacocke) welcomes his "former mentor", his brother, Heath (Ewing) does not. Ewing said "Heath went to jail when he was younger and he blames Adam for that. Adam's a bad egg, but he's charming and has lots of money, so he's not the clichéd nasty guy." Adam later agrees to help Heath's on-off girlfriend, Bianca Scott (Lisa Gormley), get some drugs, so she can cope with the death of her son. After a brief departure, Adam returned on 7 May 2013.

Adam is a friend of the Braxton brothers, who arrives in Summer Bay to help them locate their missing half-brother, Kyle (Nic Westaway). He offers guidance to Casey Braxton (Lincoln Younes) and helps pay off Darryl Braxton's (Steve Peacocke) debt. Adam meets Bianca Scott, who is suffering with the loss of her son, and she asks him for some drugs. Bianca starts to rely on Adam, as he continues to supply her with pills. Heath asks Adam to stay from Bianca, but Adam taunts him about her instead. He then tries to blackmail him into doing a job for him. Adam and Brax locate Kyle in Melbourne. Adam has sex with Bianca and her estranged husband, Liam Murphy (Axle Whitehead), confronts him about supplying her with drugs. Adam warns his son, Jamie (Hugo Johnstone-Burt), to stay away from Leah Patterson-Baker (Ada Nicodemou). He becomes angry with Jamie when he learns that he trashed the Diner. Adam asks Liam to organise a party for him and states that he will cut Bianca loose. However, he goes back on his word and Heath comes to get Bianca, who refuses to leave. Adam later asks Bianca if she wants him to get rid of Heath, but she tells him no. Bianca later breaks up with Adam. Jamie then leaves Heath for dead under Adam's orders but then Heath survives. Brax then cuts ties with Adam. Brax, Liam, Heath and Kyle then set a trap for Jamie into finding Leah. Brax then give Adam an ultimatum either Adam and Jamie get arrested or for Adam to never see Jamie again. Adam and Jamie are later arrested for their crimes.

When Adam is released and he kidnaps Heath's daughter Darcy Callahan (Alea O'Shea). He calls Heath and says the way to get her back is doing a dangerous job for him. Heath and Brax later go to a warehouse to meet Adam and Brax decides to do the job instead of Heath. Adam leaves Brax to make a deal with someone but Heath then finds someone who was going to shoot Brax. The dealer then escapes. Brax then goes to Adam and the dealer finds him and tries to run him over but Adam pushes him out of the way and later takes full impact of the vehicle. Brax and Heath end up leaving Adam for dead. However, Adam survives and uses his sister Ricky Sharpe (Bonnie Sveen) to seek revenge against the brothers. He frames Casey for a robbery and kidnaps Casey's girlfriend, Tamara Kingsley (Kelly Paterniti), holding her hostage with Ricky, who turns against him due to her feelings for Brax. He lets Tamara go and gets Brax to meet him. He later shoots Brax while he was trying to save Ricky, leaving him fighting for his life, he then goes to Brax's hospital room and tries to finish him off but is caught by Heath and Dexter Walker (Charles Cottier). Adam is later arrested for his crimes and sentenced to 25 years to life in prison. Casey and Ricky visit Adam to ask him to tell the police Brax was a teenager when he killed Johnny Barrett (Stephen Anderton). Adam later confesses that he actually killed Johnny, not Brax.

== Jamie Sharpe ==
Jamie Sharpe
- Home and Away character
- Portrayed by: Hugo Johnstone-Burt
- Duration: 2012–2013
- First appearance: 19 October 2012
- Last appearance: 8 March 2013
- Introduced by: Lucy Addario
In-universe information
- Father: Adam Sharpe
- Aunts: Ricky Sharpe
- First cousins: Casey Braxton

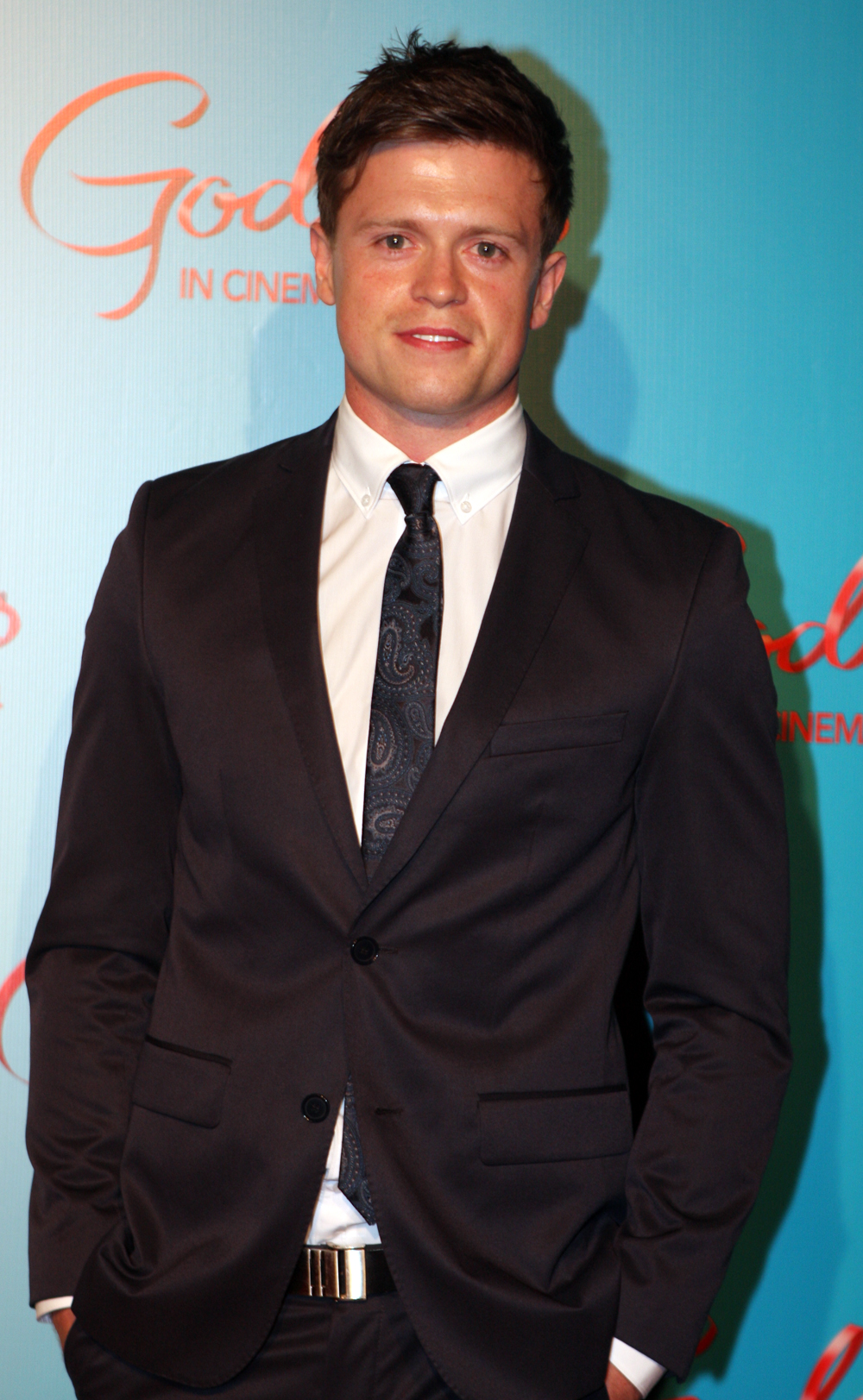
Hugo Johnstone-Burt plays Jamie Sharpe

James "Jamie" Sharpe, played by Hugo Johnstone-Burt, made his first screen appearance on 19 October 2012 and departed on 8 March 2013. The character and Johnstone-Burt's casting was revealed on 28 June 2012. The actor revealed "I'm doing a little stint on Home and Away. I'm playing a super-creepy stalker guy." He added that he was working a lot with Ada Nicodemou who plays Leah Patterson-Baker.

Nicodemou revealed that when Leah and Jamie see each other at a fundraising night, there is "an attraction across the room". Leah thinks Jamie is "very cute" and when he later approaches her, they share a kiss. Leah is hesitant about starting a romantic relationship with Jamie, especially as she has a young son and there is an age gap between them. However, Jamie does not mind their age difference and begins sending Leah lots of text messages asking for a date. Leah eventually agrees to go out with him and Nicodemou explained "On the date, Jamie's very open and interested in finding out about VJ. He opens up about his own family, and Leah really feels for him." Following the date, Leah invites Jamie to spend the night with her and Nicodemou thought that there was "definitely chemistry" between them. The next day Jamie starts "showering" Leah with gifts, which makes her feel uncomfortable.

Claire Crick from All About Soap called Jamie "creepy" and stated "At first, his gifts seemed sweet, but what appeared to be innocent enough soon turned sinister when Leah told Jamie she wasn't interested, so he trashed the Diner… Um, that's not really how normal people deal with rejection, Jamie!" Crick went on to say that she did not blame Leah for running away and thought that viewers had not seen the last of "Jamie's weird ways".

Jamie attends a fundraiser at Angelo's Restaurant in Summer Bay and catches the eye of Leah Patterson-Baker. Her friend, Marilyn (Emily Symons), goes up on stage and reveals to Jamie that Leah likes him. Jamie then comes over to talk to Leah and they share a kiss at the end of the night. Jamie sends Leah text messages asking her out on a date and comes to meet her at the Surf Club. Leah tells him she thinks she is too old for him, but Jamie states that he likes her and does not mind her having a son. He invites her out to dinner, where he reveals that his mother died while she having an affair. Leah invites Jamie back to her house and they have sex. The following day, Jamie sends Leah lots of gifts, including an expensive scarf. He tells her that he will pick her up at eight o'clock for another date, but is told by Liam Murphy (Axle Whitehead) that Leah has gone out.

As Leah soon changes her mind about embarking on a relationship with Jamie she continuously tries to cut ties with Jamie but when he begins to take a dark turn by watching her sleep and deliberately spending time with VJ things come to a head when VJ tries to warn Jamie off he violently grabs his arm threatening him Leah arrives just in time and packs her things, says goodbye before departing Summer Bay and escaping Jamie. Jamie later leaves Heath for dead under Adam's orders. He and Adam are later arrested for their crimes. Jamie then goes to prison where Casey is doing time as well. Casey then saves Jamie from getting attacked and Jamie is later transferred.

== Others ==
| Date(s) | Character | Actor | Circumstances |
|---|---|---|---|
| 1 February | Andy | Jack Horsley | Andy is a friend of Ruby Buckton (Rebecca Breeds) in the city who comments on her still being up after a party the previous night while she is with Casey Braxton (Lincoln Younes). |
| 2 February | Adrian | Daniel Nemes | Adrian is a potential client for the new resort. Dennis Harling (Daniel Roberts) leaves Romeo Smith (Luke Mitchell) to attempt to do business with him. Adrian goes surfing with Romeo to sample the local area, Dennis becomes annoyed because he thinks it is a waste of time. However, Adrian later buys five apartments. |
| 3 February | Mrs Porter | Annie Suttor | Nurse Julie Cooper (Lisa Hayson-Phillips) and Dexter Walker (Charles Cottier) help Mrs Porter through the hospital. |
| 3 February – 17 August | Dr Worsley | Michael Cullen | Dr Worsley assists Nurse Julie Cooper (Lisa Hayson-Phillips) in treating Irene Roberts (Lynne McGranger) at the hospital. He reappears, credited as Dr Edward Wilson, to inform Darryl (Stephen Peacocke) and Heath Braxton (Dan Ewing) that their father Danny (Andy McPhee) died in surgery. |
| 3–9 February | Kathy | Rachel Strickland | Kathy starts dating Harvey Ryan (Marcus Graham) and joins him at the councillors and resort development debate. Kathy tries to rally support for Harvey's campaign and accuses Dennis Harling's (Daniel Roberts) development project of not being eco friendly. She then confronts Roo Stewart (Georgie Parker) and accuses her of being jealous of the fact that Harvey is now dating her. After Harvey wins the election, he begins dating Fleur Simpson (Alys Daroy) and reveals the relationship with Kathy did not go anywhere. |
| 6 February | Bruce | Dan Prowse | Bruce delivers some chairs to Angelo's restaurant, despite Darryl Braxton (Stephen Peacocke) not having ordered any. Geoffrey King (Geoff Morrell) reveals he ordered them, signs Bruce's receipt and pays him for the delivery. |
| 7 February | Nathan Cunningham | Erin Mullally | Nathan is a stripper hired to perform at Bianca Scott's hen party. However, when he sees Bianca and Gina Austin, his former teachers, he leaves saying he cannot take his clothes off in front of them. |
| 9 February | Election official | Lindsay Moss | The election official announces that Harvey Ryan (Marcus Graham) has been elected as the councillor for Summer Bay. |
| 13–14 February | Paparazzo | Nick Dale | The paparazzo harasses Liam Murphy (Axle Whitehead) and Bianca Scott (Lisa Gormley) in the lead-up to their wedding. He offers Liam a bag of talcum powder, pretending it is drugs, and has him arrested for criminal damage when he smashes his camera. He later follows Bianca to a meeting with Heath Braxton (Dan Ewing), prompting her to panic and tell Heath to drive off. The paparazzo then goes to the wedding and shows Liam photos of them together. |
| 15 February – 26 March | Sully | Roger Scriberras | Sully helps Darryl Braxton (Steve Peacocke) train for his cage fights. He later robs Darryl's restaurant and hits him over the head with a cricket bat to stop him fighting. Sully is confronted about the incident by Heath Braxton (Dan Ewing). He runs away and grabs Bianca Scott (Lisa Gormley), threatening to throw her off a cliff. Heath allows Sully to leave after he lets Bianca go. |
| 16 February – 14 March | Tyler Churchill | Gustavo Barbosa | Tyler was in juvenile detention with Casey Braxton (Lincoln Younes) and he comes to Summer Bay to visit Casey. He meets Ruby Buckton (Rebecca Breeds) and when he learns Casey and Ruby broke up, he has a go at Ruby. Tyler takes John Palmer's (Shane Withington) car and sells it, keeping the money for himself. Tyler gets a job at the Caravan Park and he unsuccessfully asks Ruby out. Darryl (Steve Peacocke) and Heath Braxton (Dan Ewing) find out about Tyler's money and where he got it. They also learn that Casey saved Tyler from being beaten up in juvie by throwing oil in the attacker's face. Tyler leaves town, but later returns and Casey tries to help him. Tyler steals a knife from the Pier Diner and invites Casey to go camping. Casey admits he is not Tyler's friend and is only helping out of guilt. Tyler snaps and chases Casey with the knife, but Brax comes to save his brother. |
| 17 February | Jim | Matt Greenlaw | Jim considers buying John Palmer's car and takes it for a test drive. While John is trying to talk him into the purchase, the car is stolen by Tyler Churchill (Gustavo Barbosa). |
| 21 February – 23 March | Referee | Nick Zemaitis | The referee oversees the cage fight between Darryl Braxton (Stephen Peacocke) and Dick Norris. Prior to a later cage fight, Leah Patterson-Baker (Ada Nicodemou) tries to convince him to call it off because Brax has a head injury but Brax denies it and the referee goes ahead with the fight. |
| 21 February | Announcer | Kieran Revell | The announcer introduces Darryl Braxton (Stephen Peacocke) and Dick Norris prior to their cage fight. |
| 21 February | Dick Norris | Uncredited | Norris is a cage fighter with a reputation for brutality who Darryl Braxton (Stephen Peacocke) is scheduled to fight. Norris is over the weight limit for the fight but Brax elects to go ahead since he will be paid Norris' appearance fee. Brax nearly wins the fight but is distracted by the appearance of Leah Patterson-Baker (Ada Nicodemou), allowing Norris to beat him. |
| 22 February | Shari | Jacqueline Doran | Shari is a girl that Leah Patterson-Baker (Ada Nicodemou) finds with Darryl Braxton (Steve Peacocke) in his bedroom during a party. |
| 23 February – 23 March | Fleur Simpson | Alys Daroy | Fleur is the mayor's niece, who begins dating Harvey Ryan (Marcus Graham) shortly after he is elected to the council. She helps Alf Stewart (Ray Meagher) with his attempts to raise money for a school in Thailand by persuading her uncle to donate ten thousand dollars. While she is having dinner with Harvey at Angelo's restaurant, she becomes frustrated when he pays more attention to Roo Stewart (Georgie Parker) than her. Fleur ends up leaving the restaurant with Roo's date Dale Canning (Josef Brown). |
| 24 February | Traveller | James Colette | The traveller is a passenger on one of John Palmer's (Shane Withington) buses. He approaches John while he is talking on his mobile and asks when the bus is going to leave. |
| 28 February | Darren | Jamel Boukabou | Darren is a removal man that John Palmer (Shane Withington) discovers clearing out Dennis Harling's (Daniel Roberts) house as Dennis is preparing to flee town. |
| 29 February | Tess Green | Victoria Darke | Leah Patterson-Baker (Ada Nicodemou) and Roo Stewart (Georgie Parker) see Tess kissing Darryl Braxton (Stephen Peacocke) at the surf club. Later, Ruby Buckton (Rebecca Breeds) finds the two of them at his house, kissing in a state of undress. |
| 2 March | Council PA | Melissa Armstrong | The council PA welcomes Roo Stewart (Georgie Parker) to the press conference where Harvey Ryan (Marcus Graham) is announcing his development plans. She express relief Roo is involved in the project again and reveals that, contrary to what Harvey told her earlier, she is the only applicant, prompting Roo to push Harvey into a swimming pool. |
| 5–9 March | Sergeant Rafferty | Wayne Bradley | Sergeant Rafferty is Xavier Austin's (David Jones-Roberts) training instructor at the police academy, who Xavier believes is bullying him. He objects to Xavier leaving the academy without permission to support Sasha Bezmel (Demi Harman) but is convinced to give him another chance by Sergeant Watson (Jaclyn Albergoni). He continues to criticise Xavier during training and is initially dismissive after Xavier foils a robbery. After Xavier stands up to him, he changes his stance and tells the other cadets Xavier has set the standard for them. |
| 5 March | Sam Langsford | Elliott Collinson (as Elliott Langsford) | Sam Langsford is a police officer who is sitting with Sergeant Rafferty (Wayne Bradley) when Xavier Austin (David Jones-Roberts) asks permission to leave the police academy. |
| 6 March – 3 April | Margaret Henderson | Susan Prior | Margaret is Stu Henderson's (Brenton Thwaites) mother. She confronts Sasha Bezmel (Demi Harman) in the Diner about his death. Margaret and her husband Alan (Peter Phelps) attend a memorial service for Stu at the high school. After Alan collapses twice, Sid Walker (Robert Mammone) suspects Margaret had been poisoning him. Margaret catches Sasha in her house, trying to steal a book that incriminates her. Sasha later comes to Margaret and tells her how she loved Stu and did not mean for him to die. Margaret is arrested for poisoning Alan and she tells Sid to take the book. |
| 9 March | Offender | Jack Martin | The offender is part of a stop and arrest role play that Xavier Austin's (David Jones-Roberts) police cadet team are involved in. |
| 9 March | Toby | Jack McTaggart | Toby is one of the police cadets who is sharing a joke with Xavier Austin (David Jones-Roberts) and Cato when Sergeant Rafferty (Wayne Bradley) informs them that Xavier's arrest has set the standard for the rest of the group. |
| 9 March | Robber | Christopher Darling | The robber attempts to hold up a coffee shop that Xavier Austin (David Jones-Roberts) is visiting, taking a waitress (Miranda O'Hare) hostage. Xavier holds his attention and tries to talk him down, eventually overpowering and arresting him when he loses his balance and telling the other customers to call the police. |
| 9 March 9 May | Waitress | Miranda O'Hare | The waitress greets Xavier Austin (David Jones-Roberts) when he arrives at a coffee shop and is promptly taken hostage by a robber (Christopher Darling). Xavier attempts to talk the man down, causing him to lose his balance and allowing the waitress to pull away from his grip. Afterwards, she thanks Xavier for his help and promises him free coffee. She later has lunch with Dave Townsend (Ryan Gibson) at Angelo's restaurant in Summer Bay (listed as Woman in the credits), where she takes offence at something he says, throws a drink over him and storms out, leaving him to pay the bill. |
| 9 March | Cato | Uncredited | Cato is a police cadet who is partnered with Xavier Austin (David Jones-Roberts) for a stop and arrest exercise. Sergeant Rafferty (Wayne Bradley) singles the pair out to repeat the exercise. She is later on her way for a drink with Xavier and Toby (Jack McTaggart) when Rafferty tells them that Xavier's recent arrest has set the standard for the others. |
| 13 March – 11 April | Eddie Trumper | Alan Flower | Eddie is a vocal coach hired by Irene Roberts (Lynne McGranger) to further her singing hobby. Eddie is excited when he meets Liam Murphy (Axle Whitehead), a former rock star. Irene invites Eddie to her birthday party and tells him she wants to get to know him better. Eddie gives Irene a song for her birthday and she allows him to use her time in the recording studio, which Liam paid for. Liam accuses Eddie of stealing his lyrics and threatens legal action. Eddie denies taking the lyrics and comments on Liam's past drug addiction. Liam then smashes Eddie's guitar and Irene says goodbye to him. |
| 16–23 March | Dale Canning | Josef Brown | Dale is a carpenter who Harvey Ryan (Marcus Graham) persuades to donate some materials to Alf Stewart's (Ray Meagher) Thailand appeal. Roo Stewart (Georgie Parker) flirts with him in front of Harvey and later takes him on a date to Angelo's restaurant knowing Harvey will be there with Fleur Simpson (Alys Daroy). Dale attempts to engage her in conversation but she is more interested in what Harvey is doing. After Roo and Harvey spend most of the evening arguing with each other and ignoring their dates, Dale and Fleur leave together. |
| 19 March | Serena | Kiara Legay | Along with Christy Clarke (Isabelle Cornish), Serena leads a group of girls in attacking Sasha Bezmel (Demi Harman) on the beach in revenge for Stu Henderson's (Brenton Thwaites) death. She videos the beating on her mobile phone. Gina Palmer (Sonia Todd) later takes the video as evidence and suspends Serena for her part in the assault. |
| 21 March 1 May | Sonographer | Meg MacIntosh | The sonographer meets Bianca Scott (Lisa Gormley) and her sister April (Rhiannon Fish) when they come in for Bianca's ultrasound and tells them Bianca is twelve or thirteen weeks pregnant rather than eight as Bianca had believed. She meets Bianca again when she and Liam Murphy (Axle Whitehead) come in for her nineteen-week scan. |
| 29 March | Lindsay Meyer | Susie Collins | Collins' casting was announced on 17 March 2012. Lindsay is a university student and friend of Indigo Walker (Samara Weaving). She meets up with Indi at The Diner for a study session. Lindsay introduces Indi to her brother Logan (David Berry) and he helps them with their assignment. |
| 29 March – 5 June | Logan Meyer | David Berry | Logan's sister, Lindsay (Susie Collins), introduces him to Indigo Walker (Samara Weaving) and he develops an interest in her. He invites her to a party, but Indi turns him down and reveals she is married. Logan later invites Indi to go out with him and he kisses her. Logan comes to The Diner and gives Indi a pair of earrings. He is disappointed when she tells him she is staying with Romeo, but insists she keeps the earrings. |
| 5 April–10 September 2013, 16 September 2015–9 May 2022 | Constable Ben Murray | John-Paul Jory | A police officer who Gina Palmer (Sonia Todd) allows to search the lockers at Summer Bay High after a police car is vandalised. He finds a broken aerial and spray can in VJ Patterson's (Felix Dean) locker. He later arrests Neil Flemming (Josef Ber) after he threatens Indigo Walker (Samara Weaving). Murray allows Darryl (Stephen Peacocke), Heath (Dan Ewing) and Kyle Braxton (Nic Westaway) to see their brother Casey (Lincoln Younes) before he is transferred to remand after being framed for armed robbery, and he arrests Kyle when he is also implicated. Murray takes Josh Barrett (Jackson Gallagher) in for questioning over his involvement in the car accident that left Casey hospitalised. Two years later, Murray is in charge of the crime scene investigation when Kat Chapman (Pia Miller) shoots at Charlotte King (Erika Heynatz). He escorts Martin Ashford (George Mason) to the cells when he is accused of Charlotte's murder. He later stops Hunter King (Scott Lee) from gaining access to Andy Barrett (Tai Hara) in the cells, after Andy confesses to shooting Charlotte. Murray and Kat search for Irene Roberts (Lynne McGranger) when she is kidnapped by Mick Jennings (Kristian Schmid) and he is involved in the search for survivors of the plane crash caused by Spike Lowe (Jason Montgomery). He and Neal Stevenson (Michele-Antonio Mattiuzzi) retrieve Burt Simmons' laptop from his house. Murray takes Heath to see Detective Geddes (Julia Billington), consults with Kat on a number of arsons in the area and takes Irene's statement when she is confronted by Mick again. He accompanies Mick to the hospital when he is arrested for breaking his restraining order only to be overpowered by him, and finds the accelerant used to start the bushfire, before informing Kat than John Palmer's (Shane Withington) fingerprints are on the lighter found at another attempted arson. Murray investigates when Hunter and Olivia Fraser Richards' (Raechelle Banno) house is broken into and gives Brody Morgan (Jackson Heywood) a drug test after Brody tries to avoid a random breathalyser test. He looks after Luc Patterson (Tayari Gee, Piper Dickson, Anastasia Lee Hayes) while Kat searches for Patrick Stanwood (Luke McKenzie). He helps her investigate pawn shop vandalism committed by Brody and tries to arrest William Zannis (Caleb Alloway). He brings Hunter and Olivia in for questioning over the Diner robbery and tries to look into Robbo's (Jake Ryan) identity. Murray inadvertently prompts Jay Turner (Aidan Gillett) to accuse Brody of assault by bringing him to the station while Brody is there. He later joins Kat in unsuccessfully looking for Dennis Novak (Mirko Grillini) at the caravan park. He collects money Justin Morgan (James Stewart) found in a car at the garage, is knocked out by Novak when he abducts Kat, pulls Willow Harris (Sarah Roberts) over for driving an unroadworthy motorcycle and arrests Boyd Easton (Steve Le Marquand) for assault. Murray provides Kat with a copy of Robbo's file while she is suspended and is tricked into leaving her alone at the station where she helps Robbo escape. At Kat's funeral, Murray tries to keep the River Boys in line and suggests Ash look for Robbo at hospitals. He later splits up a fight between Ash and Robbo and is on duty when the federal police erase all Robbo's details from the police station computers. Murray helps rescue Ava Gilbert (Grace Thomas) after she is kidnapped by Hazel Easton (Genevieve Lemon). He is tricked by a suspended Colby Thorne (Tim Franklin) into giving him access to the police computers, but later helps him track the phone used by the person who set him up. Murray arrests Ben Astoni (Rohan Nichol) when drugs are found concealed in his surf boards, searches the factory where the boards were made with Colby and helps search Tommy O'Reilly's (Adam Sollis) house. He reports the discovery of Tommy's body and provides Colby and Robbo with details of a chemist robbery while they are searching for Jasmine Delaney (Sam Frost). He assists in the arrest of Douglas Maynard (Adam Booth) and in the search for Tori Morgan's (Penny McNamee) car when it is stolen with her baby daughter Grace Morgan (Michaela Harper Fields; Genevieve Hamilton) inside. He brings Angelo Rosetta (Luke Jacobz) a fake report that murder victim Ross Nixon (Justin Rosniak) was seen two months after his disappearance. The following year, Murray arrests Kieran Baldivis (Rick Donald). Murray later arrests Theo Poulos (Matt Evans) for vehicle theft and greets Felicity Newman (Jacqui Purvis) when she comes to the station looking for her brother Cash (Nicholas Cartwright). |
| 5 April – 28 June | Jayden Post | Christian Antidormi | Jayden is a Summer Bay High student and a member of the River Boys. VJ Patterson (Felix Dean) asks for his help in joining the gang, so Jayden dares him to vandalise a police car and steal Darryl Braxton's (Stephen Peacocke) surfboard, then tells him he cannot join. He later get into arguments with Casey Braxton (Lincoln Younes) at school and with John Palmer (Shane Withington) when he tries to get on the school bus without his pass card. He turns up late for detention with Dave Townsend (Ryan Gibson) because of football practice and causes trouble by stirring Casey about his relationship with Henri Brown (Emma Leonard). He makes fun of Dexter Walker (Charles Cottier) when he sees him training with Xavier Austin (David Jones-Roberts). He leads a group of boys who bully Jett James (Will McDonald) outside the surf club and steal his school bag before Xavier and Senior Sergeant Emerson (Cameron Stewart) step in. |
| 6 April – 11 May | Steve Carmody | Michael Sheasby | Steve meets Ruby Buckton (Rebecca Breeds) and Romeo Smith (Luke Mitchell) at a surf competition. He becomes friendly with Ruby and they later kiss. Romeo tells Ruby and Steve that he is not going to the surfing championship, which pleases Steve. Ruby and Steve later spend the night together. Steve lights up a joint, but he puts it out to please Ruby. He later places a bag of marijuana in her bag before their flight. After denying the drugs are his when Ruby is arrested, Steve leaves for the surfing competition. However, he finds Darryl Braxton (Steve Peacocke) in his hotel room and is intimidated into confessing to planting the marijuana on Ruby. Steve attends another surfing competition and Ruby tells him to leave. He gets high and when he sees Ruby and Romeo together, he reverses his car at them, injuring Romeo. |
| 13 April | Jury Foreman | Lyndall Iron | The jury foreman pronounces Sasha Bezmel (Demi Harman) not guilty of murder, following a court case where she was accused of deliberately causing Stu Henderson's (Brenton Thwaites) death. |
| 16 April | Officer Dan Foley | Garth Russell | Foley is a customs officer who finds marijuana in Ruby Buckton's (Rebecca Breeds) bag. After talking with Morag Bellingham (Cornelia Frances), Ruby suggests Steve Carmody (Michael Sheasby) put it there but Foley is unconvinced. |
| 18 April–31 January 2013 | Katie Miles | Rae Loomes | Katie and Alexa are university friends of Dexter Walker (Charles Cottier). When Dexter confides in them about his feelings for April Scott (Rhiannon Fish) and her relationship with Heath Braxton (Dan Ewing), Katie encourages him to tell April how he feels. She also admits she would not date him herself. Alexa tells Dexter to play hard to get by acting in a disinterested manner around April and puts a message on his phone telling him not to call her. They later attend a toga party Dexter organises to welcome April to university. |
| 18 April–31 January 2013 | Alexa Campbell | Camille Piazza | |
| 26 April | Mayor Bryan Coombes | Jack O'Rourke | Coombes is the mayor of Summer Bay. Xavier Austin (David Jones-Roberts) and Sasha Bezmel (Demi Harman) see him in a heated discussion with Harvey Ryan (Marcus Graham), where Harvey insists they do not have to worry about what John Palmer (Shane Withington) has been saying. Despite this, Coombes refuses to pass Harvey's plans for the redevelopment. |
| 27 April | Craig Jensen | Tim Draxl | Craig is a man from Yabbie Creek who Leah Patterson-Baker (Ada Nicodemou) meets on an internet dating site. They go for a meal at Angelo's restaurant, where Craig reveals he has depression and shows a tendency to rant about subjects that annoy him. When Leah gets drunk and lets slip she only took him there so Darryl Braxton (Stephen Peacocke) would see them together, Craig walks out and leaves Leah with the bill. |
| 27 April – 12 November | Biff Carruthers | Mitchell Burgess | Biff is a River Boy who gets chatting to a drunken Leah Patterson-Baker (Ada Nicodemou) at Angelo's restaurant after her disastrous date with Craig Jensen (Tim Draxl). When Darryl Braxton (Stephen Peacocke) arrives, Biff says he was about to take Leah home and Brax tells him not to. After Casey Braxton (Lincoln Younes) has punched Dave Townsend (Ryan Gibson) and Townsend has made a complaint to the police, Biff and two other River Boys are sitting on Townsend's car when he comes back to it and Biff makes a comment about it being damaged. He and his friend also harass Indigo Walker (Samara Weaving) at Angelo's, prompting Liam Murphy (Axle Whitehead) to throw them out. He is among the River Boys Heath Braxton (Dan Ewing) takes to see his son Rocco (Jenson Lane) but Bianca Scott (Lisa Gormley) tells them Rocco is asleep and orders them out. He attends a party that Adam Sharpe (Martin Lynes) throws at Angelo's. |
| 8 May – 4 June | Liz James | Sophie Gregg | Liz is the mother of Jett James (Will McDonald). She is called into Summer Bay High by Gina Austin (Sonia Todd) to discuss her son's behaviour. Liz reveals that she has no job due to being ill and Jett looks after her. Liz also reveals that she cannot read or write well and turns down Gina's offer of adult literacy classes. Gina later visits Jett's home and finds Liz dead in her bed. |
| 9–23 May | Dave Townsend | Ryan Gibson | Dave Townsend is a teacher at Summer Bay High. When he believes he has caught Casey Braxton (Lincoln Younes) boasting about his relationship with Henrietta Brown (Emma Leonard), Townsend gives him detention. Casey leaves detention early and Townsend later catches him giving Sasha Bezmel (Demi Harman) an illegal lift on his bike. He reports Casey to the police and Casey confronts him. |
| 11 May | Shop Owner | Sarah Pope | When Indigo Walker (Samara Weaving) attempts to return a dress she is unable to afford, the shop owner tells her the dress was on sale and not refundable. |
| 11 May | Terry Kosla | Michael Cumes | Terry Kosla is the owner of a surf shop in Yabbie Creek and an associate of John Palmer (Shane Withington). He meets Romeo Smith (Luke Mitchell) at Angelo's restaurant to discuss a sponsorship deal and agrees in return for the exposure Romeo's surfing career will give him and Romeo making personal appearances at the store. He later pulls out of the deal when he learns Romeo has a knee injury. |
| 16 May–11 April 2016 | Snr. Sgt. Mike Emerson | Cameron Stewart | Senior Sergeant Emerson is the police officer in charge of Yabbie Creek Police Station. He is first seen investigating a break-in at Colleen Smart's (Lyn Collingwood) caravan and questions Jett James (Will McDonald) when Xavier Austin (David Jones-Roberts) suggests him as a suspect but agrees not to press charges when it is learned his mother Liz (Sophie Gregg) has died. He acts as Xavier's mentor when he is posted to the station and catches him illegally accessing police records to help his mother Gina Palmer (Sonia Todd) but decides not to report him. He investigates the shooting of Danny Braxton (Andy McPhee) and realises Casey (Lincoln Younes) is responsible. He arranges for Casey to be released on bail after he misses a court appearance as a result of being kidnapped by Kyle Bennett (Nic Westaway) and gives evidence at Casey's trial. He arrests Adam (Martin Lynes) and Jamie Sharpe (Hugo Johnstone-Burt) and later Nelson Gregory (Anthony Gee). He also informs Roo Stewart (Georgie Parker) that Maddy Osborne (Kassandra Clementi) has told her mother, Tanya (Kathryn Hartman), not to come to Summer Bay. He arrests Casey for armed robbery but later takes a statement from Ricky Sharpe (Bonnie Sveem) confessing that she framed him. He arrests Adam when he tries to kill Darryl Braxton (Stephen Peacocke) and convinces him to give the doctors the information they need to save him. He arrests Brax after he confesses to killing Johnny Barrett (Stephen Anderton) and closes down the Sanctuary Lodge cult, arresting Murray Granger (Christopher Stollery). He investigates the arson at Mangrove River High, briefly suspecting Maddy and Josh Barrett (Jackson Gallagher), and Jade Montgomery's (Tasma Walton) attempt to frame Heath Braxton (Dan Ewing) for assault. He initially refused to believe Oscar MacGuire (Jake Speer) when he tried to confess to the hit and run in which Tamara Kingsley (Kelly Paterniti) was injured but later charged him. He investigates the murders of Casey and Jake Pirovic (Fletcher Humphrys). He returns Eloise Page (Darcey Wilson) to her foster parents when her father Gray (Craig Ball) takes her without permission, and investigates Spencer Harrington's (Andrew J. Morley) encounter with internet predator Keith Potts (Drayton Morley). He advises Katarina Chapman (Pia Miller) against investigating Brax without authorisation and arrests Billie Ashford (Tessa De Josselin) after she tries to frame Nate Cooper (Kyle Pryor) for assault. He also arrests Tank Snelgrove (Reece Milne) and investigates the deaths of Denny Miller (Jessica Grace Smith), Trystan Powell (Ben Mingay) and Charlotte King (Erika Heynatz). He leads the response team when Isla Schultz (Samantha Jade) commits an armed robbery. When he learns Kat is in a relationship with Detective Dylan Carter (Jeremy Lindsay Taylor), he refers the matter to Superintendent Joyce (Don Halbert), resulting in Kat being taken off the investigation into Charlotte's murder. Not long after, it is mentioned Emerson has been transferred to the city. |
| 30 May 6 June | Matthew Pearson | Stephen Noad | Matthew Pearson is one of the prison guards present when Heath Braxton (Dan Ewing) visits his father Danny (Andy McPhee). During a later visit, Matthew informs Danny that the governor wants to see him. |
| 7 June | Scott Lewis | Joss McWilliam | Scott Lewis is a prison guard who escorts Darryl Braxton (Stephen Peacocke) to the yard when he comes to visit Danny (Andy McPhee). Brax tells Scott he is Danny's son and Scott comments on the number of family who have visited Danny recently. |
| 7 June – 5 October | Rocco Scott-Braxton | Uncredited | Rocco is Heath Braxton (Dan Ewing) and Bianca Scott's (Lisa Gormley) son. He was born prematurely by caesarean section after Bianca developed pre-eclampsia. Rocco is placed into an incubator and visited by Heath and Bianca. Rocco develops jaundice and he has a fit, causing him to need a blood transfusion. Rocco remains in hospital, after Bianca is discharged. Eventually Bianca and Heath take Rocco home, but he develops meningitis and has to be rushed back into hospital. Shortly after he is discharged, Rocco dies from sudden infant death syndrome. |
| 15 June | Mia Cameron | Kate Skinner | Mia is a representative from a modelling agency who meets Indigo Walker (Samara Weaving) at Angelo's and looks at her portfolio. She takes Indi's details but feels her lack of flexibility means she cannot offer her much work. She tells Indi it will cost $1,000 for her to get a proper portfolio done and to contact her if her situation changes. |
| 19 June | Jackson | Douglas Hansell | Jackson is a photographer hired by Indigo Walker (Samara Weaving) to take some shots of her. He convinces her to do some bikini shots but, when he suggests some "arty" topless shots, she refuses and brings the shoot to an end. |
| 22–13 June 2013 | Nurse Alex | Joanna Downing | Alex is a member of staff at the Northern District Hospital who performs a check on a delusional Bianca Scott (Lisa Gormley) and tries to convince her her baby is safe and sound. When Bianca later becomes hysterical on seeing Liam Murphy (Axle Whitehead), Alex prepares some diazepam so Sid Walker (Robert Mammone) can sedate her. She looks after Dexter Walker (Charles Cottier) when he suffers brain damage in a car accident and is overheard by April Scott (Rhiannon Fish) complaining to her colleague Romina (Rose Purse) about how much trouble he is. She informs Gina Palmer (Sonia Todd) that Doctor Young (Charlie Hopkins) has ordered tests on her husband John (Shane Withington) after he has suffered a blow to the head. She later looks after Jett James (Will McDonald) when he faints after Gina's death from an aneurysm and after John when he slips a disc, instructing Dexter to give him a sponge bath. |
| 26 June | Dean Phillips | Anthony Burke | Dean is a representative of Mungo Sports Surf who interviews Romeo Smith (Luke Mitchell) at Angelo's restaurant for a salesman position. Romeo makes a good impression on him and later learns he has the job. |
| 4 July | Nurse Wanda Fisher | Alexandra Aldrich | Wanda is the nurse watching Heath Braxton (Dan Ewing) and Bianca Scott's (Lisa Gormley) son Rocco when he has a fit. She summons assistance and helps Sid Walker (Robert Mammone) treat him. |
| 10 July 22 October | Clay | Lucas Connolly (as Lucas Connelly) | Clay is one of two men paid by Danny Braxton (Andy McPhee) to knock his son Brax (Stephen Peacocke) unconscious and dump him in the bush. He is later tricked by Adam Sharpe (Martin Lynes) into going to Angelo's restaurant where Brax and Adam ask him for information about Danny's secret son Kyle (Nic Westaway). Clay refuses to respond to Brax's threats so Adam offers to help his brother, who is facing criminal charges, if he helps them. |
| 13 July–26 March 2013 | Richard Bozic | Radek Jonak | Gina Austin visits Richard to discover whether he is Jett James' (Will McDonald) father. Richard decides not to meet with Jett, which angers him and he turns up at Richard's house to smash his plant pots. Richard comes to Summer Bay and meets with Jett. He later demands a DNA test and when it reveals he is Jett's biological father, Richard decides to take Jett to West Australia with him. However, when Jett begins acting up, Richard brings him back and allows him to stay with Gina. When John and Gina decide that they want to adopt Jett, Richard returns to the Bay to talk about the situation. |
| 13 July | Patient | Dave Kirkham | A patient at the Northern District Hospital where Dexter Walker (Charles Cottier) works. |
| 19 July | Gary Turner | Daniel Krige | Gary is a shady acquaintance of Darryl Braxton (Steve Peacocke) who Brax is discussing a drug deal with when Casey (Lincoln Younes) comes home and interrupts them. Gary and Brax later meet in a car where Gary gives him the details to collect the drugs from the wharf. |
| 25 July – 9 August | Bob Lawson | Danny Mulvihill | Bob is in charge of the drug run that Darryl Braxton (Stephen Peacocke) becomes involved in. After delaying their boat's departure, he learns the police are waiting for them at the wharf and wants to dump the drugs. Brax convinces him to take the drugs in a dinghy while he meets the police. Bob fails to turn up at the rendezvous and Brax thinks he has betrayed him but Bob has simply gone to the wrong side of the river. Brax later agrees to take part in another deal but when Bob changes the buyer and the merchandise at the last minute Brax pulls out. |
| 25 July | Bill Crosby | Ben McNalli | Crosby is the courier who is meant to be delivering drugs to Bob Lawson (Danny Mulvihill) and Darryl Braxton (Stephen Peacocke). He turns up late after getting a flat tyre. |
| 26 July | Water Policeman | Christian Willis | The water policeman boards Darryl Braxton's (Stephen Peacocke) boat while investigating drug activity. He queries Brax's claim to be on his way to pick up a bucks party but leaves when he finds nothing. |
| 1 August–6 May 2013 | Molly Brenner | Alison McGirr | Molly is Jett James' (Will McDonald) case worker. She meets Gina Palmer (Sonia Todd) to discuss his progress and John (Shane Withington) interrupts the meeting to announce they want to foster Jett permanently. As part of the process, Molly contacts Richard Bozic (Radek Jonak) to arrange a DNA test to determine whether he is Jett's father. When the test comes back positive, Molly tells the Palmers and Jett that Richard wants custody of Jett. She meets with Gina after Jett has gone to live with Richard and advises her against trying to get in contact. When the Palmers later decide to adopt Jett, Molly is concerned that they have told him of their plans when the adoption is still in the early stages. After Jett convinces her he wants the adoption, she contacts Richard and tells them that he will fly down to discuss matters. She mediates a meeting between the four of them after which Richard agrees to the adoption. After Gina's death, she meets with John and Marilyn Chambers (Emily Symons) to discuss the possibility of John adopting Jett on his own. |
| 16 August – 13 November | Pete Simpson | Mark Hodson | Pete is a pub manager who discovers Danny (Andy McPhee) and Casey Braxton (Lincoln Younes) committing an armed robbery. Danny forces him to empty the safe and tells Casey to tie him up, then orders Casey to shoot him. Casey shoots Danny instead and Pete is freed when Darryl Braxton (Stephen Peacocke) and Natalie Davison (Catherine Mack) arrive. Brax tries to claim responsibility for the shooting and tells Pete to back him up but, when Casey also confesses, Pete tells Senior Sergeant Emerson (Cameron Stewart) that Casey is telling the truth. He later gives evidence at Casey's trial and states Casey saved his life but prosecutor Paul Willows (Richard Sydenham) questions his interpretation of Casey's motives. |
| 27 August–17 May 2016 | Dr Ben Dawson | Richard Healy | Dr. Dawson is the neurologist who tests Dexter Walker's (Charles Cottier) responses and memory after he recovers from a coma. He later chairs a conference meeting to discuss Dexter's progress, after which he advises Sid (Robert Mammone) that Dexter would be better off at a rehab centre in the city. He examines Dexter after he has a seizure and keeps him in overnight for observation. Afterwards, he tells Dexter the scans are clear but he should still be careful. In 2015, he chairs the enquiry into Nate Cooper (Kyle Pryor) treating Kyle Braxton (Nic Westaway) without keeping proper records and gives him a month's suspension. He later diagnoses Marilyn Chambers (Emily Symons) with retrograde amnesia after she has received an electric shock. In 2016, it is mentioned that Dawson is leaving to work in the private sectors. He interviews both Nate and Tori Morgan (Penny McNamee) to replace him as head of emergency medicine and offers the job to Tori. |
| 4 September–22 January 2013 | Nurse Romina | Rose Purse | Romina is one of the nurses looking after Dexter Walker (Charles Cottier) following the car accident where he suffered brain damage. April Scott (Rhiannon Fish) overhears her and Nurse Alex (Joanna Downing) discussing his care and criticises them for their lack of sympathy. She looks after Romeo Smith (Luke Mitchell) when he collapses as a result of steroid abuse, Sid Walker (Robert Mammone) after he has been attacked by Neil Flemming (Josef Ber) and Heath Braxton (Dan Ewing) when he is brought in with hypothermia after being left out at sea. |
| 12 September | Sophie White | Julia Kennedy Scott | Sophie is a physiotherapist at the Northern District Hospital who attends a conference meeting headed by Doctor Dawson (Richard Healy) to discuss Dexter Walker's (Charles Cottier) recovery. She speaks encouragingly of Dexter's progress but when pressed admits he had difficulty finding his way around. |
| 24 September | Dr Alex Bennett | Penny Gray | Dr Bennett is a doctor in the city who looks after Rocco Scott-Braxton. (She introduces herself as Alex Bennett but is credited as Dr Rosi Bennett.) She informs Bianca Scott (Lisa Gormley) and Heath Braxton (Dan Ewing) that Rocco has an infection and is not responding as well to antibiotics as the staff had hoped. She later tells Bianca and Irene Roberts (Lynne McGranger) that Rocco has strep B and there is a risk of meningitis. |
| 25 September | Dr Jonathan Fitzsimmons | James Lugton | Dr Fitzsimmons brings Bianca Scott (Lisa Gormley) and Heath Braxton (Dan Ewing) the results of their son Rocco (Hunter Charlesworth)'s latest blood tests and tell them it is good news. |
| 28 September | Ross Farghar | Himself | Ross greets Darryl Braxton (Stephen Peacocke) and Natalie Davison (Catherine Mack-Hancock) on their arrival in the outback, providing them with a truck and directions to Nanburrula. |
| 28 September | Pilot | Eddie Farghar | The pilot flies Darryl Braxton (Stephen Peacocke) and Natalie Davison (Catherine Mack-Hancock) to the outback. |
| 10 October – 1 May 2013 | Alistair Pepplewell | Joel Barker | Alistair is a student at Summer Bay High. Gina Palmer (Sonia Todd) tells him to pick up some litter in the corridor even though someone else dropped it and threatens to put him on detention when he argues. Jett James (Will McDonald) hears him make a comment about Gina and fights with him until Gina steps in. He is in a class with Jett shortly after Gina's death, where he is referred to as Toby Oakwood, and reminds Zac MacGuire (Charlie Clausen) of what Jett has gone through. |
| 15 October | Repo Man 1 | Alex Nicholas | Two repo men comes to Angelo's restaurant while Alf Stewart (Ray Meagher), Roo Stewart (Georgie Parker), Marilyn Chambers (Emily Symons) and Harvey Ryan (Marcus Graham) are eating there and begin removing the fridges. When Darryl (Stephen Peacocke) and Casey Braxton (Lincoln Younes) arrive, one of them gives Brax a letter revealing he has defaulted on his loan and they have been instructed to remove anything of value. Brax stops Casey grabbing hold of the man and lets them take what they want. |
| 15 October | Repo Man 2 | Ben Jesinowski | Two repo men comes to Angelo's restaurant while Alf Stewart (Ray Meagher), Roo Stewart (Georgie Parker), Marilyn Chambers (Emily Symons) and Harvey Ryan (Marcus Graham) are eating there and begin removing the fridges. When Darryl (Stephen Peacocke) and Casey Braxton (Lincoln Younes) arrive, one of them gives Brax a letter revealing he has defaulted on his loan and they have been instructed to remove anything of value. Brax stops Casey grabbing hold of the man and lets them take what they want. |
| 18 October | Cordelia Tuck | Taylor Thomson | Cordelia is a representative of a SIDS charity. Sasha Bezmel (Demi Harman) sees her with Casey Braxton (Lincoln Younes) going into his bedroom and believes they have slept together but in fact he was donating his vintage surfboard to a charity auction. Heath Braxton (Dan Ewing) later presents Cordelia with the cheque for the money raised by the surf carnival. |
| 29–30 October | Mackenzie Watson | Kate Jenkinson | Darryl (Steve Peacocke) and Heath Braxton (Dan Ewing) comes to Mackenzie's house in Melbourne and ask her if Kyle Bennett (Nic Westaway) is staying with her. Mackenzie states that he was there, but left. She takes their number and as they leave, she asks Kyle if he heard their conversation. She later encourages him to meet up with Brax and Heath. |
| 29–30 October | Thug 1 | Jason Cavenagh | A trio of thugs accompany Kyle Braxton (Nic Westaway) to his meeting with his brothers Brax (Stephen Peacocke) and Heath (Dan Ewing). The situation is about to become violent when two policemen (Thomas Hayden, Chris Weir) appear and they flee the scene with Kyle. |
| 29–30 October | Thug 2 | Liam Pederson | A trio of thugs accompany Kyle Braxton (Nic Westaway) to his meeting with his brothers Brax (Stephen Peacocke) and Heath (Dan Ewing). The situation is about to become violent when two policemen (Thomas Hayden, Chris Weir) appear and they flee the scene with Kyle. |
| 29–30 October | Thug 3 | Cayde Joy | A trio of thugs accompany Kyle Braxton (Nic Westaway) to his meeting with his brothers Brax (Stephen Peacocke) and Heath (Dan Ewing). The situation is about to become violent when two policemen (Thomas Hayden, Chris Weir) appear and they flee the scene with Kyle. |
| 29–30 October | Policeman 1 | Thomas Hayden | A police officer in Melbourne where Darryl (Stephen Peacocke) and Heath Braxton (Dan Ewing) are searching for their brother Kyle (Nic Westaway). He is sent by Mackenzie Watson (Kate Jenkinson) to break up a tense encounter between the three. |
| 30 October | Policeman 2 | Chris Weir | One of two policemen who arrive at an underpass as a fight is about to break out between Darryl (Stephen Peacocke) and Heath Braxton (Dan Ewing) on one side and their half-brother Kyle (Nic Westaway) and three thugs (James Cavenagh, Liam Pederson, Cayde Joy) on the other. |
| 31 October | Sean Dougherty | Scott Johnson | Sean is a man Marilyn Chambers (Emily Symons) meets through an internet dating agency. They have a meal at Angelo's and get on well when Sean reveals he owns a New Age bookshop that Marilyn frequents. However, when John Palmer (Shane Withington) approaches them to check on Marilyn and questions Sean, Sean becomes suspicious of their relationship and he and Marilyn part company. |
| 31 October–19 September 2013 | Winston Markman | John Batchelor | Winston goes on a date with Marilyn Chambers (Emily Symons) at The Diner, but it is not successful. A few weeks later, Winston returns to Summer Bay when Roo Stewart calls him to be Harvey Ryan's best man. In 2013, Winston buys the Blaxland of Harvey as they are raising money to get Pippa Saunders (Piper Morrissey) to America, and he becomes close with Marilyn again. He stops a fight between Spencer and Josh, telling Josh to go away and escorts Maddy home. |
| 1–15 November | Neil Flemming | Josef Ber | Neil is Lisa Flemming's (Rachael Beck) husband. He becomes suspicious when Sid Walker (Robert Mammone) turns up looking for Lisa, even though she states that his son is a patient. When Lisa leaves him, Neil becomes angry and he attacks Sid. He later goes looking for Lisa and holds Sid's daughter, Indi (Samara Weaving) hostage. Neil is arrested, but later released. Lisa then decides to go back to him, so he will not terrorise Sid's family any more. |
| 7 November | Anastasia Delaserra | Ksenija Lukich | Anastasia is one of the attendees at a party at Adam Sharpe's (Martin Lynes) house. She messes around in the swimming pool with a young man and encourages Bianca Scott (Lisa Gormley) to join them. |
| 13–20 November, 25 February–16 March 2015 | Craig Stanley | Christopher Morris | Craig is Casey Braxton's (Lincoln Younes) lawyer. He informs the Braxton family that Tamara Kingsley (Kelly Paterniti) has gone missing before she can give evidence. He calls Kyle Braxton (Nic Westaway) as a witness and has him testify about their father Danny (Andy McPhee) setting Casey up over the armed robbery. He also calls Tamara to the stand when she arrives and manages to get the failure to appear in court charge dismissed. He makes a request for leniency after Casey is found guilty of the robbery and afterwards advises the family that appealing against the conviction would be unwise considering the light sentence. In 2015, Craig acts as Darryl Braxton's lawyer. He advises Brax to plead guilty to murder to get a reduced sentence. When Brax insists on pleading not guilty, Craig attempts to discredit Sam Kennedy (Wade Briggs) as a witness by bringing up his hatred of Dean Sanderson (Kevin Kiernan-Molloy) but his argument falls apart when Sam reveals Brax stole money from Dean. |
| 13 November–10 April 2017 | Judge Beech-Jones | Fiona Press | Judge Beech-Jones presides over Casey Braxton's (Lincoln Younes) trial. She agrees to dismiss the failure to appear in court chargeafter hearing Kyle Braxton (Nic Westaway) and Tamara Kingsley's (Kelly Paterniti) evidence. After Casey is found guilty of armed robbery, she sentences him to a good behaviour bond and periodic detention. She later serves as magistrate at Ricky Sharpe's (Bonnie Sveen) sentencing hearing where she attempts to direct Darryl Braxton (Stephen Peacocke) to give evidence. When he refuses, she has him imprisoned for contempt of court until a $12,000 fine is paid. On hearing the evidence of the other victims, she gives Ricky a two-year suspended sentence. She later performs the same role when Brax confesses to the manslaughter of Johnny Barrett (Stephen Anderton) and sentences him to fifteen years with a non-parole period of ten years. Judge Beech-Jones oversees John Palmer's arson and manslaughter trial. When he is found guilty, she sentences him to fifteen years in prison. |
| 13 November–9 October 2013 | Clerk Tarrant | Patrick Trumper | Tarrant is the clerk of court at Casey Braxton's (Lincoln Younes) trial who reads out the charges against him. He later serves as a court official at Ricky Sharpe's (Bonnie Sveen) sentencing hearing where he attempts to swear in an uncooperative Darryl Braxton (Stephen Peacocke) as a witness. He takes Brax into custody after he is sentenced for the manslaughter of Johnny Barrett (Stephen Anderton). |
| 20 November | Jury Foreperson | Stephanie Son | The jury foreperson announces that Casey Braxton (Lincoln Younes) has been found not guilty of murdering his father Danny (Andy McPhee) but guilty of armed robbery. |
| 23–27 November | Gary Reed | Richard Huggett | Gary is Harvey Ryan's (Marcus Graham) best friend. Winston Markman (John Batchelor) contacts Gary and invites him to Harvey's stag party in the city. |
