= Tamara Kingsley =

- Home and Away character
- Portrayed by: Kelly Paterniti
- Duration: 2012–2014
- First appearance: 1 October 2012
- Last appearance: 21 May 2014
- Introduced by: Lucy Addario
In-universe information
- Occupation: Waitress; Student
- Father: Patrick Kingsley
- Mother: Joanne Kingsley
- Brothers: Pete Kingsley

Tamara Jane Kingsley is a fictional character from the Australian Channel Seven soap opera Home and Away, played by Kelly Paterniti. Tamara debuted on-screen during the episode airing on 1 October 2012. Originally a guest cast member, Paterniti was promoted to the show's regular cast. Tamara is a country girl, characterised as a "strong-willed and feisty female". Paterniti has described her as "very bold and quite pragmatic". Paterniti filmed her final scenes as Tamara in late 2013 and made her screen exit on 21 May 2014.

Tamara's storylines are heavily associated with the Braxton family, particularly through her romance with Casey Braxton (Lincoln Younes). Tamara is introduced during the show's storyline set in the Australian outback desert. She finds Casey stranded after his brother, Kyle Braxton (Nic Westaway), tries to kill him. Upon moving to Summer Bay, Tamara testifies in court for Casey, competes with Sasha Bezmel (Demi Harman) for his affections and begins a relationship with him. Other stories include Kyle falling in love with Tamara and being abducted by Adam Sharpe (Martin Lynes). Vanessa Williams from The West Australian said that Tamara "made her mark" on Home and Away. A Brisbane Times reporter described Tamara and Casey as the show's hottest couple.

== Casting ==
Paterniti's first scenes were aired during 1 October 2012. Paterniti relocated from Western Australia to Sydney for filming. She revealed that she was initially nervous about joining Home and Away, saying "there is the fear that at some point you are going to be in a bikini, and that did play on my mind. You can't obsess over it, though. I think once you rip the bandaid off, it's fine." In February 2013, it was revealed that Paterniti had been promoted to the show's regular cast. She told Vanessa Williams of The West Australian that "Tamara is going to be around for a while but who knows just yet how long."

== Development ==
=== Characterisation and introduction ===
"Tamara is a country girl, through and through. Brought up in a small town, the youngest child of a sheep farming family, she spent her youth in open fields with fresh air. She loves the land. She loves her family. But she could see how hard the life was, what it had done to her mother, a once vibrant woman systematically worn down by hard work and isolation, and so Tamara craved more for her future."

— Yahoo!7 on Tamara (2013)

Tamara is characterized as strong-willed and feisty. Partneriti told Erin Miller from TV Week that "I'm not as bold as Tamara, but I certainly would like to be. Tamara is a tough nut and she's got guts. She's very bold and quite pragmatic - a true bush girl." She is described on the show's official website as being "industrious, practical and lives her life in the knowledge that it can be taken from you in a heartbeat." She is emotionally strong and has a strong sense of social justice.

Tamara is introduced during a storyline in which Casey Braxton (Lincoln Younes) is kidnapped by Kyle Braxton (Nic Westaway) and left for dead in the Australian desert. Darryl Braxton (Steve Peacocke) and Natalie Davison (Catherine Mack) also feature in the storyline. In an interview with Kylie Gillies on The Morning Show, Westaway said that the episodes are action packed and Peacocke added that there were helicopters, stunt men and an explosion carried out on set. Executive producer Lucy Addario told Miller that such a stunt could only be filmed in a remote location in the outback. Younes told Erin Miller of TV Week that halfway through his ordeal a "mystery woman" appears and he is unsure if she wants Casey or Kyle. Mack added that "we really don't know anything about her the whole time". However, it soon becomes apparent that Tamara is an ally and gives Casey water. Kyle, who left Casey for dead, returns to the scene after Brax's car chases him. He recaptures Tamara and Casey. She throws a flaming petrol can at Kyle, causing an explosion, and then attempts to shoot him. Brax and Natalie locate them, bringing the ordeal to an end.

Casey was due to attend court when Kyle kidnapped him. Casey is taken to trial once again and he needs Tamara to testify for him. Younes told an Inside Soap reporter that without Tamara's help Casey would have been sent to prison. But she complicates the scenario because, as Younes explained, "Tamara has an aversion to authority, so she's reluctant to take on the responsibility." However, Tamara changes her mind and testifies in court.

=== Relationship with Casey Braxton ===
==== Tamara/Casey/Sasha ====
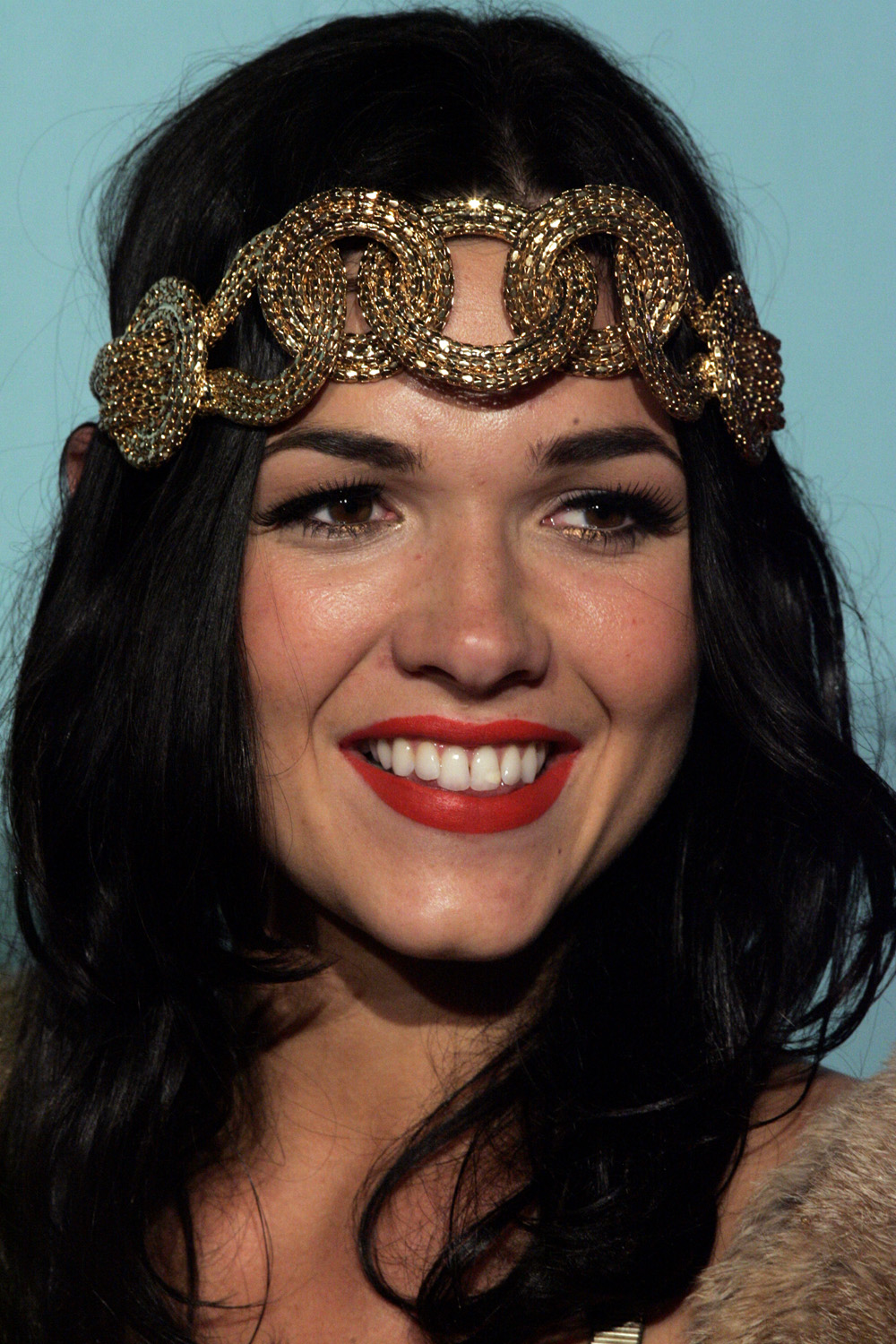
Demi Harman plays love rival Sasha Bezmel.

Tamara became involved in a love triangle with Casey and Sasha Bezmel (Demi Harman) in late 2012. Tamara's arrival makes Sasha jealous. Younes told Miller that Casey has mixed emotions because he did not think he would see Tamara again. Casey and Tamara went through a "spiritual ordeal" and he is "overjoyed" to see her again. Paterniti revealed that things would become more complicated for the trio in 2013. Tamara feels that she has an instant connection to Casey, especially because she helped him out when he was in "a really vulnerable state". Tamara decides to visit her estranged family, but she returns after they reject her. Paterniti told an Inside Soap reporter that Tamara is stranded and grateful when Casey lets her move in. But she feels the need to confess her feelings to Casey and they sleep together. Paterniti revealed that "she's so happy when they go on to spend the night together, because she's wanted to be with Casey for a long time." But their happiness does not last as Sasha's jealousy becomes a problem. Then Tamara's ex-boyfriend, Nelson (Anthony Gee), arrives in Summer Bay and Paterniti revealed that Tamara was involved in "a fairly abusive relationship" with him. Tamara "freaks out" when she learns Nelson is in the Bay and decides that she needs to leave immediately. However, Casey insists that she should stay and not be intimidated by her ex. Paterniti explained "Casey tries to help and convince her she should go to the police, but she's lost faith in the authorities." Nelson later demands that Tamara leaves with him, but she and Casey are rescued by Kyle, who stands up to Nelson.

Tamara was the victim of domestic abuse during her relationship with Nelson. Paterniti wanted to portray the issue sensitively because she did not want to insult victims of domestic abuse. She felt it was challenging because no violence aspects were depicted. The actress told Williams that "being hit on screen or thrown around, you'd build up that tension where it happens at any second, but if you don't actually see it, it's a lot more challenging. It was quite difficult to do."

"Casey has a strong connection to both, and he can't seem to put the history he shared with Tamara in the desert behind him. I think Casey and Tamara are better suited, purely because she doesn't let him become too down or introspective."

— Lincoln Younes on Tamara, Casey and Sasha (2013)

==== Tamara/Casey/Kyle ====
Tamara and Casey's relationship faces more uncertainty when his brother Kyle develops feeling for Tamara. The two become closer as they both work at Angelo's restaurant. Westaway told a reporter from Inside Soap that "he thinks that if he and Tamara hadn't met in the circumstances they did, they'd get along really well". He feels as though they have much more in common than she does with Casey. Kyle decides to make Tamara aware of his feelings to see how she reacts. But she is unnerved and keeps her distance from Kyle. Westaway explained that "he desperately tries to make Tamara see that there could be something between them." Tamara is an "amazingly passionate and strong woman" and Kyle cannot change the way he views her, despite Tamara calling him delusional.

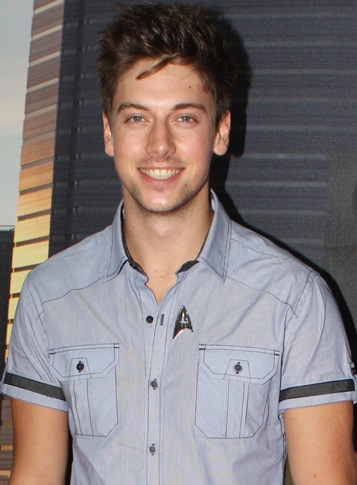
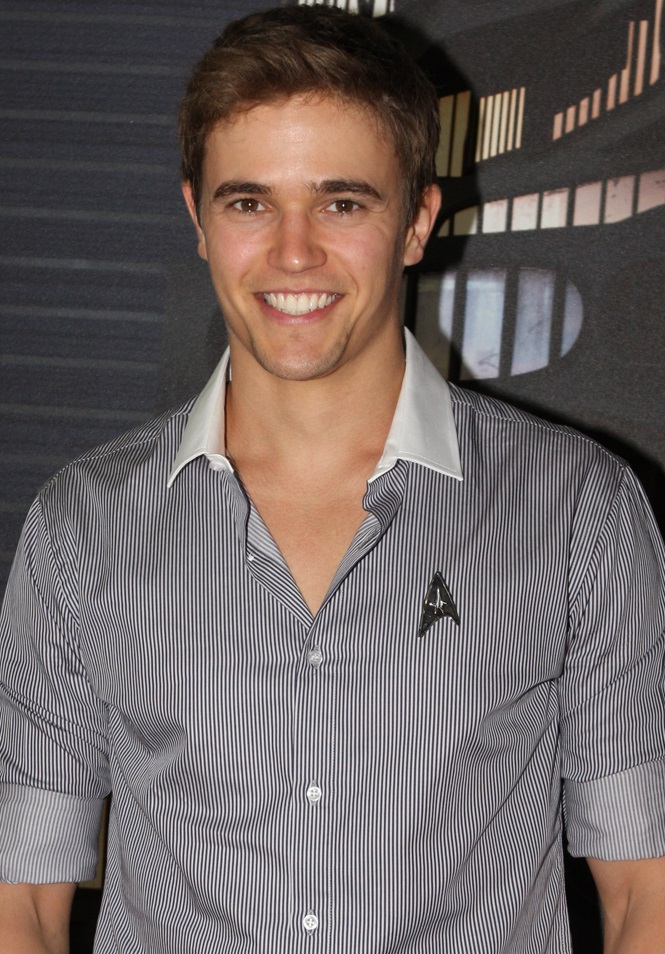
Lincoln Younes (left) and Nic Westaway (right) portray Casey and Kyle Braxton.

Paterniti told Amber Giles from TV Week that Tamara "never in a million years" could have thought Kyle loved her. "It throws her off-guard, because she's been nothing but severe with him and shown him very little love." It comes at a time when Tamara and Casey set up a home together and she is "excited" because she loves him. But Kyle's behaviour around her makes Tamara think "gosh, does he have feelings for me". Paterniti added that Kyle believes Tamara loves him too, which leaves her feeling "stunned". Tamara keeps the admission a secret. But the truth is revealed during a Braxton family event.

The actress told Miller (TV Week) that Tamara is preoccupied with Casey and fails to notice Kyle admiring her. Cheryl Braxton (Suzi Dougherty) notices and deliver the revelation, causing a drunken fight. The actors particularly enjoyed filming the violent stunts. Subsequently, Tamara and Casey's relationship becomes unstable - she explained that Tamara and Casey "have a rule to remain open and honest with each other and she hasn't been". But Tamara wanted to avoid anymore conflict, and after the fight she feels justified. Despite still feeling angry, Tamara agrees to a reconciliation with Kyle. But she finds herself on the receiving in a "very one-sided" kiss from Kyle. Paterniti opined that it is the point in the storyline that gives Tamara "a real shock". She fears it could destroy her relationship. Brax becomes aware of the kiss and becomes "incredibly annoyed" with them. The actress added that "it's the worst thing that could have happened and it brings back all of the tension between the Braxton's again."

=== Abduction ===
Tamara is later abducted at a bus stop by accomplices of Adam Sharpe (Martin Lynes), an enemy of the Braxton family. The drama begins when Casey is framed for drug dealing. Younes told Carolyn Stewart from TV Week that "Tamara is hysterical because she and Casey were just getting their relationship back on track, it's been a bit rocky, then, out of nowhere, this happens." When she learns that Kyle and Ricky Sharpe (Bonnie Sveen) were involved in the plot, Tamara attacks Kyle. Paterniti told Miller (TV Week) that Tamara "sees red" and in a fit of anger punches Kyle. She also feels betrayed by Ricky because the Braxton's welcomed her into their lives. Tamara decides to tell the police the truth. "Under the circumstances, Tamara doesn't care about the bigger picture. She loves Casey and she wants to get him out of jail." Brax and Heath Braxton (Dan Ewing) persuade Tamara to keep quiet as police involvement could endanger their lives. But Adam decides to remove Tamara and organises her abduction. Paterniti added that "she’s grabbed off the roadside and shoved into a car. One minute she is excited about seeing Casey and the next she’s terrified and unconscious."

=== Departure ===
Paterniti confirmed that she had left Home and Away, shortly after Tamara's last scenes were broadcast on 21 May 2014. Paterniti told a TV Week columnist, "This was always when I wanted to leave. It would be different if I felt I hadn't done much. But, Tamara went through a lot! We never had to repeat storylines." Paterniti said that it was the longest she had played a character, and admitted that she was ready to try something new as she gets bored easily. Paterniti also confirmed that she had finished filming in late 2013. Producers did not want Paterniti to leave and offered her a three-year contract to remain on the show. But she felt it was too long to commit to.

== Storylines ==
Tamara finds a kidnapped Casey Braxton bound to a broken down car and tortured in the desert and helps him by giving him water to drink. When Kyle Bennett, Casey's abductor returns, he finds Tamara trying to tamper with his vehicle and proceeds to kidnap the pair, but after taking them to an old dirt track location and a brief chase between Casey & Kyle, Tamara starts Kyle's vehicle tricking him into thinking she's driving off but Kyle notices she has escaped and demands she returns. Unknown to Kyle, Tamara ignites the spare petrol container Kyle kept in his truck and tosses it at him causing an explosion allowing all 3 to escape. Weeks later, she turns up in Summer Bay for Casey's court case and gives evidence. Tamara decides to stay in the Bay and she tells Casey that she cannot go home because she feels responsible for her brother's death. Casey gets her a job at Angelo's and Tamara later kisses him on the beach. Casey's girlfriend Sasha Bezmel becomes jealous and Casey tells them both that he just wants to be friends. Tamara gets a delivery job at Angelo's and she confronts Casey, telling him that she wants a relationship with him. Casey tells Tamara that she should go home and talk to her parents about her brother's death. Tamara returns and breaks down, telling Casey that things with her parents did not go well. The pair decide to begin a relationship. But Nelson arrives in Summer Bay and attempts to force Tamara into returning home with him. Kyle attacks Nelson and they hand him in to the police station. Tamara is spared charges for covering up the circumstances of her brother's death. She constantly worries as Casey has to spend his weekends in prison.

Tamara and Casey move into together and she decides to enrol at Summer Bay High to complete her HSC. Tamara begins to be hostile with Kyle despite his help. But she begins to change her opinion of him unaware that he is attracted to her. Kyle tells Tamara how he feels and she rejects him. Casey finds out the truth and Tamara is upset when Casey does not trust her. Kyle tries to kiss Tamara and she threatens to leave Summer Bay to defuse the tension. She soon becomes annoyed when Casey spends all of his time working at the gym. She convinces Casey to stand up for himself and has an argument with his boss Indi Walker (Samara Weaving). Tamara and Ricky are kidnapped by Adam and fail to escape. Tamara refuses food and soon becomes weak so Adam lets her go. She is admitted to hospital and she is diagnosed with amnesia. Tamara cannot remember who Casey is and becomes dependent on Kyle. Casey is upset that she cannot remember him and agrees to give her space. However, Tamara develops feelings for Kyle and the two later start dating.

After Casey suffered from alcohol poisoning, Tamara gets her memory flashbacks about the desert. Later, after Ricky's trial, she gets some more memories back. After Heath and Bianca married, Tamara's friend, Maddy along with Casey were involved in a car crash. Maddy manage to survive, but Casey broke his spine, resulting in his legs being paralyzed. Ricky convinces her to help Casey with the physio and managed to get the feeling into his feet again. She brings Casey home while he is on crutches and was excluded from a family meeting when Brax confessed to killing a man, which the public disbelief when Brax is arrested. Casey and Tamara reconcile and continue their relationship. When Mangrove River High burnt down, Tamara came back to Summer Bay High and didn't get along with Matt Page who tried to steal one of her books until Montgomery tells him to give it back.

Tamara is hit by Oscar MacGuire (Jake Speer) while driving his uncle Zac's car. Oscar later admits to hitting her leaving Tamara upset, she finds out she could become blind which results in her wanting to leave Summer Bay to be with her parents. Tamara asked Oscar why he left her for dead on the road. Oscar confessed that he thought he hit an animal, not a human. Tamara makes her peace with Oscar and leaves Summer Bay the same day.

== Reception ==
Williams of The West Australian said "from filming dramatic scenes in a red-hot desert to stirring things up in Summer Bay, it's safe to say [..] Kelly Paterniti has already left her mark on" Home and Away. A reporter from the Brisbane Times said that Tamara and Casey are "Home & Away's hottest couple". Laura Morgan from All About Soap described her as a "beautiful brunette", Casey's "temptress" and nicknamed her "ticked-off Tam". The desert storyline was named the best plot of November 2012 by Inside Soap. Their reporter declared it as one of Home and Away's "most spectacular and ambitious storylines ever".
