= Jett James =

Fictional character from the soap opera Home and Away

- Home and Away character
- Portrayed by: Will McDonald
- Duration: 2012–2015, 2017, 2019
- First appearance: 7 May 2012
- Last appearance: 30 May 2019
- Introduced by: Lucy Addario
In-universe information
- Other names: Jett Palmer (adoptive name)
- Occupation: Student; Army Lieutenant
- Father: Richard Bozic
- Mother: Liz James
- Adoptive father: John Palmer
- Adoptive mother: Marilyn Chambers
- Brothers: Byron Fisher (adoptive)
- Sisters: Shandi Ayres (adoptive); Heather Frazer (adoptive)
- Wife: Lindsey (2023–present)

Jett Palmer (also James) is a fictional character from the Australian soap opera Home and Away, played by Will McDonald. The actor received a request through his agent to audition for the role of Jett. After two weeks, he was shocked to learn that he had won the part. Home and Away marks McDonald's first television role. He made his first screen appearance during the episode broadcast on 7 May 2012. In May 2015, it was announced that McDonald was to leave Home and Away, Jett departed on 1 July 2015. McDonald has since reprised his role for guest appearances in November 2015, May 2017, and March 2019.

Jett was introduced as a rebellious teenager, who had plenty of attitude, but needed someone to trust him. He was forced to fend for himself at a young age because his mother was a drug addict, who often moved them from place to place. Following his mother's death, Jett was fostered by Gina (Sonia Todd) and John Palmer (Shane Withington). Todd thought that Jett was "a much-needed light" when the Palmer's relationship began to suffer. In February 2013, Jett developed a crush on Indigo Walker (Samara Weaving), which spiralled out of control when her husband was injured. The character was later involved in a boating accident. McDonald earned a nomination for the Most Popular New Male Talent Logie Award for his portrayal of Jett.

== Casting ==
The character and McDonald's casting was announced in late April 2012. McDonald had learned from his agent that there was request for him to audition for Home and Away. Two weeks after auditioning, he was informed that he had won the part of Jett. McDonald told Andrew Mercado from TV Week that he was "stunned" to get the role of Jett and later stated "When I got the part, Mum and Dad called me downstairs and Dad told me the role was mine. I was speechless. I thought this had to be a dream; I was so excited I could not stop jumping around." Jett is McDonald's first television role and he revealed that his first day on the set was "so surreal" and nerve-wracking. McDonald explained that it was hard to keep up with his school work during the week, so he has to catch up at the weekends. McDonald made his debut screen appearance as Jett during Episode 5512, which was broadcast on 7 May 2012.

== Development ==
=== Characterisation ===
Jett was introduced to Home and Away as a rebellious 13-year-old boy. A Channel 5 writer described him as "a delinquent with a lack of respect for authority and a knack for causing trouble", adding that he would fit in with Summer Bay's reputation for being "a playground to wayward teens". McDonald said that Jett would get on some of the other character's bad sides, especially VJ Patterson's (Felix Dean), while he would also make an enemy of Gina Austin (Sonia Todd), the principal of Summer Bay High. A writer from the official Home and Away website called Jett "a smart kid with plenty of attitude". He learnt to fend for himself because his mother, Liz (Sophie Gregg), was a drug addict, who often moved from place to place when she suffered a relapse. With no father around, Jett stole food and money to help himself and his mother. The website writer added that Jett is "a good kid" at heart, who loves his mother and just needs someone to trust him. McDonald told Andrea Black, editor of the Home & Away Collector's Edition 2012 magazine, that Jett was a regular teenager, who just wanted to fit in. He has had a lot of independence in his life due to his mother's situation. When asked what the most challenging aspects of playing Jett were, McDonald said "I've led an opposite life to Jett - he had this horrible upbringing, so I've had to put myself in that place as to what I would do if I had to survive on my own and provide for a family."

=== Family ===
After his mother died, Jett was fostered by Gina and her husband, John (Shane Withington). When Jett's biological father, Richard Bozic (Radek Jonak), turns up, Jett suddenly decides to move away with him, which leaves "a gaping hole" in Gina and John's life. Gina attempts to win Jett back, causing a strain on her marriage, but it pays off when Jett returns home. Todd stated that Jett's arrival in Gina and John's life came at the right time, calling him "a much-needed light" when their relationship began to suffer. The Palmers later announce their intention to adopt Jett and Todd said "John and Gina love Jett – they feel they can give him the love and parenting that he deserves. Gina has a strong maternal streak." When the adoption is approved, the family decide to go on holiday, but during the journey Gina collapses at the wheel of the car. Both John and Jett are scared by what has happened and are unsure about what to do. Jett is both shocked and confused by Gina's collapse, fearing that he is going to lose another mother. Gina dies from an aneurysm and McDonald said that her death would have a big impact on Jett. He explained "Jett's just had a horrible roller-coaster ride and things aren't getting better for him. There's more heartbreak ahead. It's going to get harder. I can say that although Gina's passing is a horrible experience, it does bring Jett and John closer." He added that the two characters would form a strong father-son bond.

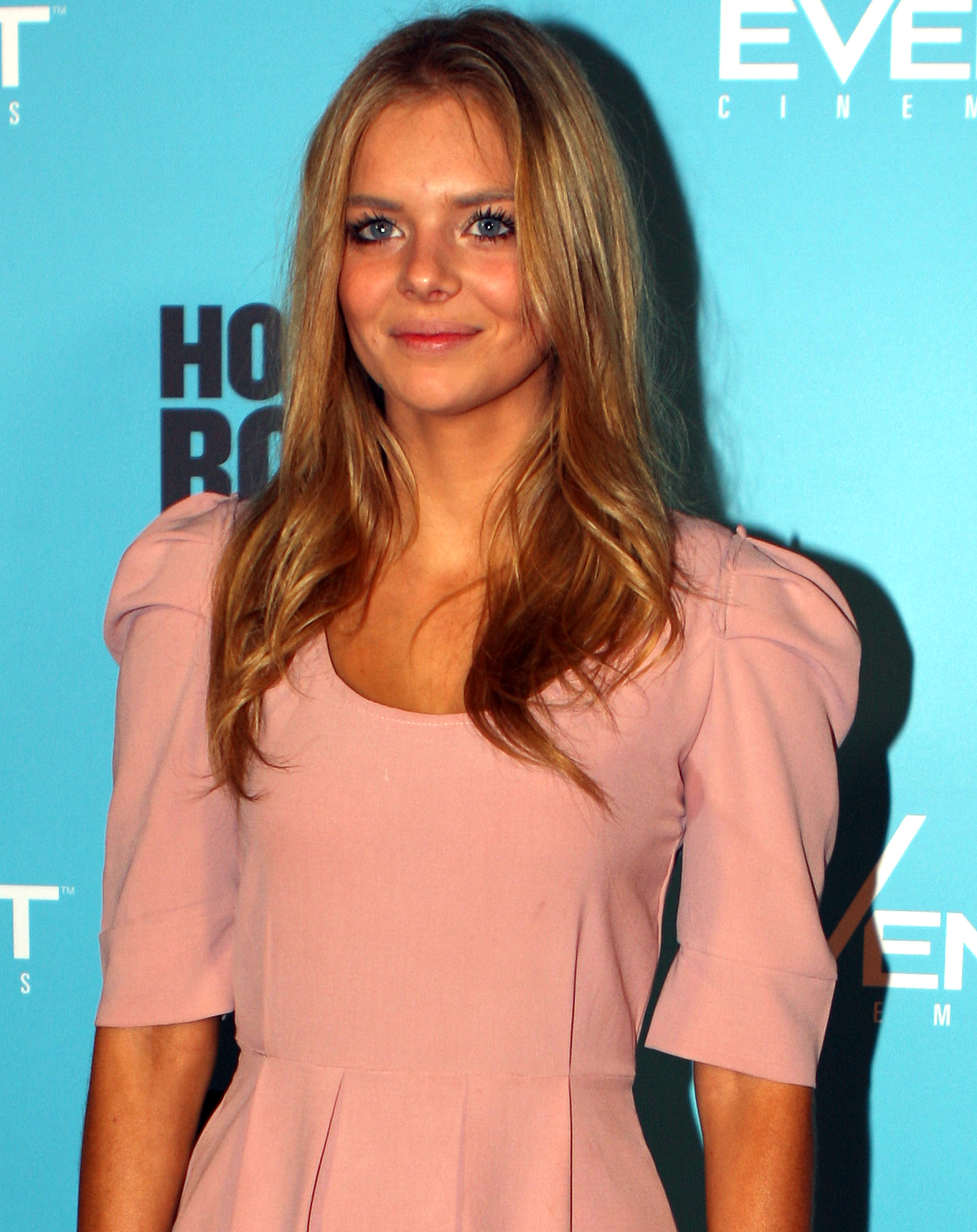
Jett developed a crush on Indigo Walker played by Samara Weaving (pictured).

=== Crush on Indi Walker ===
On 3 February 2013, Susan Hill from Daily Star reported Jett would develop "a dangerous crush" on Indi Walker (Samara Weaving). Weaving explained that Jett tries to impress Indi, but the situation would get out of control when Indi's husband, Romeo (Luke Mitchell) is injured. The actress told a TV Week columnist that Indi is not aware of Jett's infatuation with her at first. She continued "He's trying to impress her by being a 'man', like Romeo. Indi's really nice to him – she helps him with his studies since he doesn't have many friends in the Bay, and she enjoys his company. It's harmless – until it goes a bit crazy." Jett tricks John into taking Gina on a night out, so he can call Indi to babysit. However, his plan is almost derailed when John asks Romeo to visit Jett and talk to him about growing up.

In order to spend time with Indi alone, Jett takes Romeo's wallet and throws it in a shed, before locking Romeo inside. Weaving believed that Jett was not thinking of the repercussions because of his young age. Jett's plan amounts to nothing when John and Gina insist that he spends the night at the Walker family's home instead. When Indi begins to worry about Romeo's whereabouts, Jett uses Romeo's phone to send her a text saying he is in the pub. Meanwhile, Romeo attempts to escape the shed, but falls and knocks himself unconscious. An All About Soap reporter noted that Indi soon realises what has been occurring and tells Jett that nothing can happen between them. Weaving quipped that Jett would not be able to lie his way out of what has happened. When Romeo is found, he, John and Gina turn up at the Walker's and Jett is forced to apologise for his actions.

=== Boating accident ===
In one storyline Jett nearly drowns in a boating accident. His predicament begins when Jett takes a trip on his boat which is not seaworthy. John and Marilyn (Emily Symons) decide to get married and they try to find Jett and get his blessing. But they are alarmed when they cannot find him. Alf Stewart (Ray Meagher) alerts John that Jett must have headed into the sea in the boat. The pair begin a frantic search to find Jett while Marilyn stays on land to keep a look-out. Jett's boat sinks and he is forced to try and swim back to the shore. Marilyn notices Jett having trouble swimming back and realises she cannot reach him in time. She alerts Darryl Braxton (Steve Peacocke) who decides to risk his life to save Jett and jumps in the water. Peacocke told Rebecca Lake of TV Week that it was a "being in the right place at the right time" scenario as Brax rushes to save Jett's life. But he warned that Brax begins to run out of energy the closer he gets to Jett and more drama ensues. He does manage to save Jett and Peacocke added that the scenes resembled US television series Baywatch.

=== Departure and returns ===
In May 2015, it was announced that McDonald would be leaving Home and Away. His character's exit aired on 1 July 2015. The storyline sees Jett leave the Bay to attend military school. Both John and Marilyn are unhappy that he is joining the armed forces, especially John, who feels that he is losing his best friend. Jett is disappointed when he realises that no one is making a fuss about his departure. When he learns that there will not be a party, he is "deflated". However, the Bay residents have secretly planned a farewell party at the Diner for him.

McDonald later returned for guest appearances from 19 November 2015, and in May 2017. McDonald was pictured filming scenes on Palm Beach, alongside Symons and Withington in September 2018. A writer for Inside Soap confirmed that the character would make his return in early 2019. Jett returned in the episode broadcast on 12 March 2019. He turns up at the Diner to surprise John and Marilyn, and they soon wonder if there is more to his unexpected return than first thought. Jett is injured in an explosion while serving abroad, and the serial then explored how Jett deals with paralysis.

Four years later, writers offered an update on the character's off-screen life, as John tells Marilyn that Jett has gotten engaged to his girlfriend Lindsey.

== Storylines ==
While at the beach, Jett steals a tourist's wallet. John Palmer tries to catch him, but Jett outruns him. Jett later steals VJ Patterson's shirt and hits him. When he starts attending Summer Bay High, principal Gina Austin punishes him for bullying. Jett asks Heath Braxton (Dan Ewing) for some drugs and steals money from Colleen Smart (Lyn Collingwood). Jett is questioned by the police and Gina tries to get him to open up to her. Jett steals Indigo Walker's wallet, but she decides not to press charges. Gina tries to visit Jett and his mother at home, but Jett refuses to let her in. When Marilyn Chambers is mugged, Gina's son Xavier (David Jones-Roberts), is convinced Jett did it. Jett later admits that Xavier is right. Gina tries to see Jett's mother, but he claims that she is in the hospital. Gina then invites him to stay with her family and makes him to apologise to Marilyn. Gina later takes Jett's house keys and discovers his mother has died. Jett had been keeping her death a secret and he is sent to live with a foster family. When he runs away, Gina takes him in.

After his mother's funeral, Jett acts out and pushes Gina. He runs away, but returns to apologise. Jett is bullied by Jayden Post (Christian Antidormi) and during a fight with him, Jett drops a photo of his mother with a man, who he believes is his father. Xavier learns that the man is Richard Bozic and Gina goes to speak with him, only to learn that Richard does not want to meet Jett. Angered at Richard's rejection, Jett smashes Richard's garden up. Richard then meets with Jett. Gina and John decide to foster Jett on a permanent basis, but Richard decides that he wants his son to live with him. Jett leaves with Richard, but returns weeks later. Jett bonds with VJ and they train for the surf carnival. When he learns John kissed Marilyn, Jett calls Marilyn a marriage wrecker. When VJ and his mother suddenly leave town, Jamie Sharpe (Hugo Johnstone-Burt) questions Jett about where they have gone. Jamie steals Jett's phone and John advises Jett to stay away from him. Indi reassures Jett that VJ will return and Jett develops a crush on her.

Indi babysits Jett, which delights him, until her husband, Romeo, turn up. Jett rubs lipstick on Romeo's shirt collar, hoping to cause trouble, but Romeo quickly realises what he has done. Jett tricks John and Gina into going out for the night and asks Indi to babysit. He then steals Romeo's wallet and locks him in a shed. Jett's plan to be alone with Indi is ruined when he has to go to the Walker's. Jett sends Indi a text from Romeo's phone, telling her that Romeo is in the pub, which makes her suspicious. Shortly afterwards, Gina, John and Romeo arrive to confront Jett. Realising that Romeo was injured, he apologises. Tilda Hogan (Gigi Perry) begins bullying Jett. She hits him and forces him to complete assignments for her. Jett gets his own back by writing an essay for her, in which she admits to bullying Jett because she has a crush on him. Gina and John decide to adopt Jett. Richard flies in and tells them that he does not want to give up on his son. This angers Jett and he accuses Richard of not wanting anyone else to have him. Richard relents and a court date is set to make the adoption official. To celebrate, they family decide to go on holiday afterwards. During the trip, Gina suddenly stops the car, falls unconscious and dies, leaving Jett and John devastated. Jett begins dating Nina Bailey (Emmy Dougall), a girl he met at the school disco. Jett is happy when VJ returns and they begin catching up. Jett introduces VJ to Nina, but they reveal that they hate each other as VJ believes Nina stole a Pokémon card he owned in primary school. When VJ asks Jett to choose between him and Nina, Jett chooses Nina.

John and Marilyn get engaged and John asks Jett to be his bestman. John's daughter Shandi Ayres (Tess Haubrich) tries to break up John and Marilyn's relationship, and Jett tells her to stop. At the wedding, Jett asks John and Marilyn to adopt him and they agree. Jett calls John "Dad", but struggles to see Marilyn as his mother. Jett goes on a school trip to Canberra and joins the other students sleeping in a trench at an ANZAC experience. Jett finds Alf, who has become seriously ill. Jett visits Alf at the hospital and befriends Tom Knight (Vincent Ball). Jett attends an ANZAC Memorial and then tells John and Marilyn that he wants to join the army. He enrolls in a military school and the Summer Bay residents throw him a farewell party. Jett calls Marilyn "Mum" for the first time. A few months later, Jett returns to the Bay to see John, while Marilyn is away. Jett tells John that he and Nina broke up and he introduces John to his new girlfriend, Skye Peters (Marlo Kelly). Jett and Skye tell John that Skye has run away from her mother after her she was blamed her for the death of her sister. Jett returns to military school and has a long-distance relationship with Skye, but they eventually break up.

A couple of years later, Jett surprises John at the Surf Club and explains that Alf rang him, so he decided to come and see what is going on with John and Marilyn, who have separated due to Marilyn's lack of trust in John. Jett encourages John to seek professional help. Discovering John has dissociative amnesia they visit John's childhood home, where they discover that John's father died the day after his 10th birthday and not of a heart attack as John believed. John begins counselling, as he is plagued by images of his former self carrying a Jerry can, and hypnotherapy is recommended. Jett discovers that Marilyn has begun learning hypnotherapy, but she struggles and he pushes her to try harder and practice on him. Despite many attempts Jett and Marilyn fail, however, John volunteers to try and he remembers that his father killed himself. John and his mother burned down the barn with his father's body inside, shocking Marilyn and Jett. John has no memory of what happened during the hypnotherapy session. Jett and Marilyn keep the details from John, but Jett struggles and presses Marilyn to inform John of the truth.

Jett makes a surprise return to the Bay to see John and Marilyn. He bonds with John and Marilyn's foster daughter, Raffy Morrison (Olivia Deeble) as he helps her with her homework. John wonders why Jett has turned up unannounced, and Jett explains that he is being deployed to Afghanistan for six months. Marilyn is upset by the news and thinks he is too young to go. Jett seeks advice from Alf, and Marilyn later apologises for asking him not to go. Jett assures her that he has a good team and they will look out for each other. Jett says his goodbyes to Marilyn, John and Alf, telling them to take care of each other. Not long after, Marilyn and John learn there has been an explosion at Jett's base and they struggle to get in touch with him. An officer soon informs them that Jett has been critically injured and is being evacuated to a hospital in Germany. John and Marilyn fly out to be with him, and they soon return to Summer Bay together, where Jett is transferred to the Northern Districts hospital. Tori Morgan (Penny McNamee) informs them that Jett has suffered a serious injury to his spinal cord, resulting in complete loss of sensation and muscle function from the waist down, meaning Jett will not walk again. Jett initially has trouble accepting the diagnosis. He breaks down in front of nurse Jasmine Delaney (Sam Frost) and says that he has let his team, John and Marilyn down.

Jett struggles to use a wheelchair for the first time and pushes everyone away, but after some encouragement from John, he tries again. Tori's brother, Mason Morgan (Orpheus Pledger) helps Jett to improve his muscle mass and upper body strength. He also bonds with Robbo (Jake Ryan) over their shared experiences, and Robbo encourages him to ask for help when he needs it. Jett then talks with the Army Chaplain about his survivors guilt. He applies for a home, as he feels ready to move out and be independent. However, he struggles to do things on his own, and realises that his mind has not caught up with his body. John also tries to do things for him, until Marilyn and Alf get him to back off. Marilyn also helps Jett to decides on a new career, after he admits he wants to help other veterans and soldiers. An apartment in the city becomes available and Jett accepts it. After a family breakfast, Jett visits Gina's bench and thanks John and Marilyn for all their help, before he moves to the city. Four years later, John and Marilyn attend Jett's wedding to his fiancée Lindsey.

== Reception ==
For his portrayal of Jett, McDonald received a nomination for the Most Popular New Male Talent Logie Award in 2013. Claire Crick from All About Soap wrote that Jett had "never been a loveable sort of character", until he met Richard and his softer side emerged. Crick continued "When he first arrived in town, Jett gave us very little reason to like him. He picked on poor VJ for a start, and also made a habit of mugging the locals. But since he's moved in with Gina and John, we've seen a different side to the student. Without his mum, he's clearly a confused soul who just wants to be loved."
