= Marriage Acts =

2000 Australian TV movie

- Directed by: Robert Marchand
- Written by: Anne Brooksbank
- Produced by: Gary Reilly
- Starring: Colin Friels; Sonia Todd
- Cinematography: Kim Batterham
- Edited by: Christopher Spurr
- Music by: Carl Vine
- Release date: 2000
- Running time: 90 minutes
- Country: Australia
- Language: English

Marriage Acts is a 2000 Australian telemovie starring Colin Friels as a family law judge who is targeted by a mad bomber. It was directed by Rob Marchand and co-stars Sonia Todd as the judge's wife.

== Cast ==
- Colin Friels as David McKinnon
- Sonia Todd as Jean McKinnon
- David Whitney as Detective Jansen
- Linden Wilkinson as Miriam Hawkins
- Anna Lise Phillips as Anna McKinnon
- Laurence Breuls as Michael McKinnon
- Dean Atkinson as John
- Philip Holder as Brian Hutching
- Odile Le Clezio as Marj
- Adam Hedditch as Malcolm
- Mark Priestley as Dan Hawkins
- John Batchelor as Constable
- Sarah Aubrey as Christine Zuanic

== Reception ==
Tony Johnston from the Herald Sun wrote "These sound like lofty ideals for any sort of engrossing telemovie, but in the hands of Friels, director Robert Marchand (Kangaroo Palace, The Potato Factory), and a generally strong supporting cast, Marriage Acts succeeds as a compelling piece of drama." The Age's Brian Courtis gave it 3 stars praising the performances from Friels and Sonia Todd.
