= Martin Lynes =

Australian actor (born 1967)

- Born: 12 July 1967 (age 59); Sydney, Australia
- Occupation: Actor
- Years active: 1995–2014
- Partner: Jo Kempshall Giles

Martin Lynes (born 12 July 1967) is a retired Australian actor who was best known for his role as Luke Forlano in Australian Drama All Saints.

== Career ==
Lynes is known for his work as Dr. Luke Forlano on All Saints, an Australian hospital drama. On the series he tried many times to become the Chief medical officer but failed. He was primarily a surgeon but spent time helping in ward 17. He has also played Rick Gallager in Sea Patrol. Lynes then played Coach Simmo who ran the surf academy Solar Blue for budding pro surfers in Blue Water High, shown on ABC Australia. Lynes has also had roles in the now defunct McLeod's Daughters and as the head of an advertising company in the popular TV drama Packed to the Rafters.

Lynes joined the cast of Home and Away in 2012 as villain Adam Sharpe.

== Post acting career ==
Currently, Lynes lives on the Central Coast of NSW and worked as a Real Estate Agent, for the agency Property Central Long Jetty.

In August 2017 he was found guilty of sexual assault. He received a custodial sentence of 5 years.

== Filmography ==
Year	Title	Role	Notes
1995	Police Rescue	Ned Spinks	
1996	Pacific Drive	Scott Ballintyne	
1997	The Devil Game	Muzza	
1997	Big Sky	Roger	Episode: "Good Luck Baby"
1998–2004	All Saints	Luke Forlano	
2005–08	Blue Water High	Craig "Simmo" Simmonds	
2006	Monarch Cove	Detective Straker	
2007	Sea Patrol	Rick Gallagher	
2008	The Black Balloon	Emergency Doctor	
2008	McLeod's Daughters	Frank Edwards	
2010–11	Packed to the Rafters	Paul Morgan	
2011	The Eye of the Storm	Edward	
2011	Burning Man	Graham	
2012–2013, 2014	Home and Away	Adam Sharpe	

== External life ==
- Martin Lynes at IMDb
