= Demi Harman =

Australian actress and television presenter (born 1993)

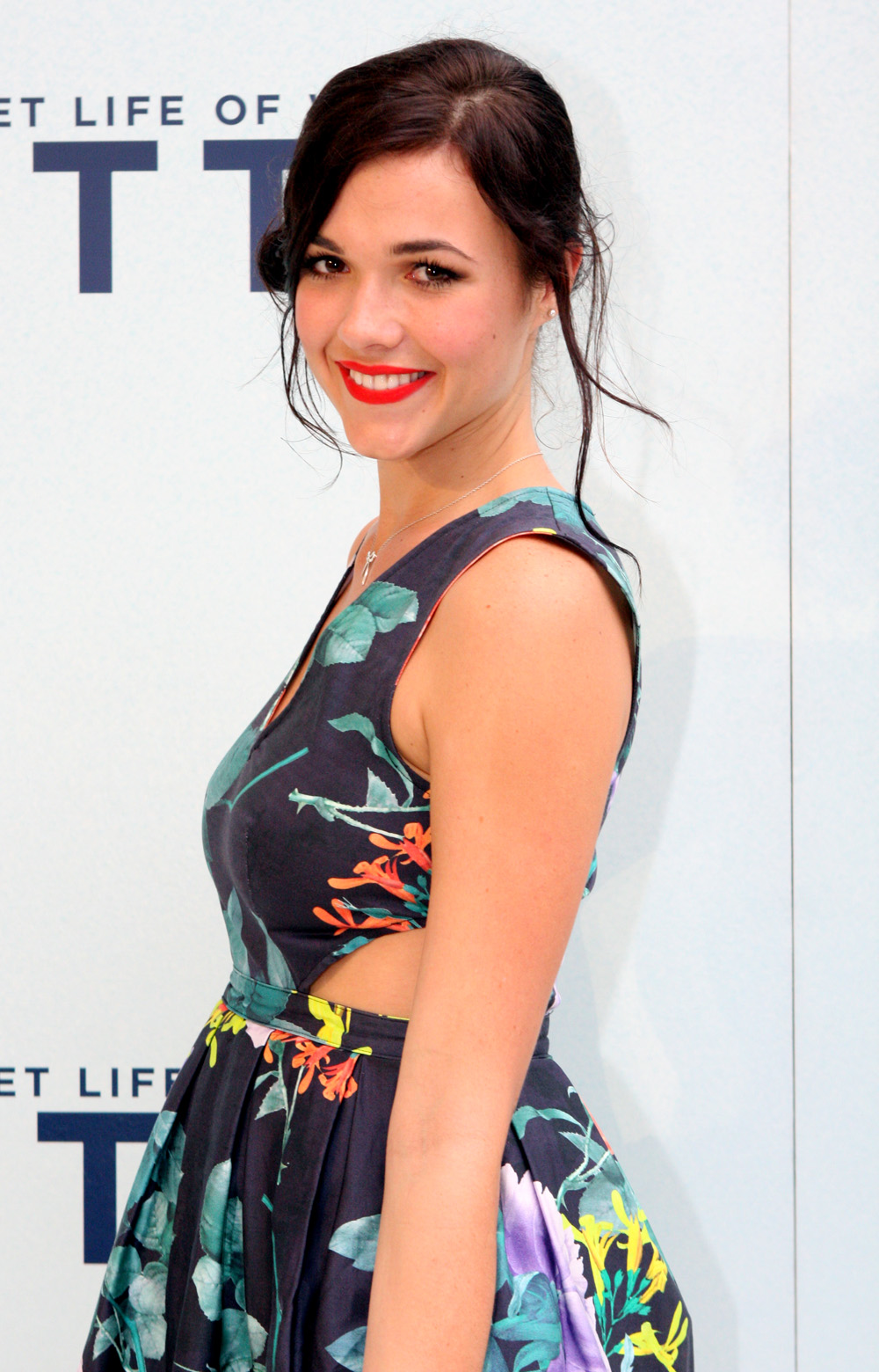
- Demi Harman at The Secret Life of Walter Mitty Sydney premiere in 2013
- Born: 11 March 1993 (age 33); Brisbane, Queensland, Australia
- Education: Brisbane Adventist College
- Occupations: Actress, television presenter
- Years active: 2009–present
- Spouse: Andrew Brooks (m. 2022)
- Children: 1
- Relatives: Brooke Harman (sister)

Demi Renee Harman (born 11 March 1993) is an Australian actress and television presenter. She is perhaps best known for her role as Sasha Bezmel in Home and Away. She was a contestant on the first series of Celebrity Splash!. Following her departure from Home and Away in 2015, Harman co-hosted Better Homes and Gardens and played Riley Hart in television drama Winners & Losers.

== Early life ==
Harman was born in Brisbane, Australia in 1993 to an American father and an Australian mother, Carrie, who formerly worked as a weather girl on the Seven Network. She is the third of four children. Her older sister is American-Australian actress Brooke Harman, and she also has an older brother, Beau, and younger sister, Paige. When Harman was growing up, she lived between the United States and Australia, and at the age of nine she moved to Melbourne when her sister Brooke began working on television series Pirate Islands. Harman finished high school at Brisbane Adventist College in 2010 and was accepted into the University of Queensland for an arts/Japanese course. Japanese culture has been a great influence in her life after a holiday to Japan.

== Career ==
Harman studied drama in high school and took Tom McSweeney acting classes. She began acting in 2010 with a role in Australian horror film Still Waters between 2010 and 2011.

In August 2011, Harman joined the main cast of Australian television soap opera Home and Away as rebellious teenager Sasha Bezmel, the illegitimate daughter of Sid Walker. Harman relocated to Sydney for the role.

In 2013, Harman was a contestant in the first Australian season of Celebrity Splash!. The following year, Harman announced her departure from Home and Away. She joined the presenting team of Better Homes and Gardens in 2015. That same year, she also joined the cast of Winners & Losers as Riley Hart. The role required her to relocate to Melbourne.

In 2021 Harman starred in Stan's original film Christmas on the Farm.

== Personal life ==
Harman dated her former Home and Away co-star Alec Snow, who played Matt Page from 2013 to 2017. Harman announced her engagement to producer Andrew Brooks in July 2019, and they married in California on January 23, 2022. In March 2023, Harman and Brooks announced they were expecting their first child, and Harman gave birth to their son in early August.

== Filmography ==
Year	Title	Role	Notes
2009	H_{2}O: Just Add Water	Student, uncredited	Season 3, Episode 20
2011	Still Waters	Sarah	
2011–2015	Home and Away	Sasha Bezmel	Series regular
2013	Celebrity Splash	Herself	
2015–2016	Better Homes and Gardens	Presenter	
2016	Winners & Losers	Riley Hart	
2019	Modern Family	Tattoo Girl	Season 10, Episode 22
2021	Christmas on the Farm	Avalon	Original film
