= Sonia Todd =

Australian actress

- Born: 1959 (age 66–67); Adelaide, South Australia, Australia
- Education: National Institute of Dramatic Art (BFA)
- Occupation: Actress
- Years active: 1984–present
- Notable work: Police Rescue (1989–1996); McLeod's Daughters (2001–2009); Home and Away (2009–2013)

Sonia Todd (born 1959) is an Australian actress. She is best known for her television roles as Sgt. Georgia Rattray in Police Rescue (1989–1996), Meg Fountain in McLeod's Daughters (2001–2008) and Gina Austin in the soap opera Home and Away (2009–2013).

== Career ==
Todd studied at the National Institute of Dramatic Art where she starred in the play Strictly Ballroom, directed by Baz Luhrmann.

Todd became known from her role of 'Georgia Rattray' in the television series Police Rescue, for which she won for an AFI Award in 1991. She was also nominated for an AFI Award for her role in the four-part mini-series The Potato Factory (2000).

From 2001–06, 2007, 2009 (guest), she played Meg Fountain in McLeod's Daughters.

Todd held a recurring role in All Saints from late 2007 to early 2008; portraying psychiatrist Dr Elizabeth Foy, after having previously played the part of Kate Larson

In January 2009, Todd joined the cast of Seven Network drama series Home and Away in the regular role of Gina Austin. After four years on the show, Todd decided to leave Home and Away to pursue other acting challenges. She appeared in the legal drama Janet King.

== Personal life ==
Todd is married to Rhett Walton and has two sons (born in 1992 and 2000), the first from a previous relationship.

== Filmography ==
=== Television ===
Year	Title	Role	Notes
1989–96	Police Rescue	Sgt. Georgia Rattray	Seasons 1–5 (main role, 62 episodes)
1990	Come In Spinner	Helen McFarland	Miniseries (4 episodes)
1991	A Country Practice	Jane Anderson	Season 11, Episodes 9 & 10
1992	Mother and Son	Policewoman	Season 5, Episode 3
1994	G.P.	Judy Walsh	Season 6, Episode 6
1997	Good Guys, Bad Guys	Wendy Johnson	Season 1, Episode 1
1997	Return to Jupiter	Commander Edwina Dent	Season 1 (main role, 13 episodes)
1997	Simone de Beauvoir's Babies	Karla	Miniseries (4 episodes)
1997–98	Mirror, Mirror	Caroline McFarlane	Season 2 (26 episodes)
1998	Water Rats	Detective Sergeant Louise Bradshaw	Season 3 (13 episodes)
1999	Halifax f.p.	Helen Hunt	Season 1, Episode 13
1999	Wildside	Dr. Alexa Grant	Season 2, Episode 20
2000	The Potato Factory	Hannah Solomon	Miniseries (4 episodes)
2001	All Saints	Kate Larson	Season 4 (recurring, 10 episodes)
2001–08	McLeod's Daughters	Meg Fountain / Dodge	Seasons 1–4 (main role, 88 episodes)
2001–08	McLeod's Daughters	Meg Fountain / Dodge	Season 4 (guest, 1 episode)
2001–08	McLeod's Daughters	Meg Fountain / Dodge	Seasons 5–6 (recurring, 19 episodes)
2001–08	McLeod's Daughters	Meg Fountain / Dodge	Seasons 7–8 (guest, 3 episodes)
2007–08	All Saints	Dr. Elizabeth Foy	Seasons 10–11 (recurring, 7 episodes)
2009–13	Home and Away	Gina Austin	Seasons 22–26 (main role, 322 episodes)
2010–18	Rake	Jane Greene	Seasons 1–2, 4–5 (13 episodes)
2014	Janet King	Gail Jones	Season 1 (5 episodes)
2022	The Secrets She Keeps	Judge	Season 2, Episodes 1 & 2
2022	After the Verdict	Anita Lang	Season 1 (recurring, 3 episodes)
2026	Return to Paradise	Yvonne Clayton	1 episode (1.4 Buried Past)

=== Film ===
Year	Title	Role	Notes
1987	Damsels Be Damned	Female Shoe Sales Assistant	Short film
1994	Police Rescue	Sgt. Georgia Rattray	Feature film version of series
1996	Shine	Sylvia	Feature film
1996	Natural Justice: Heat	Jennifer Harivald	TV movie
1997	Reprisal	Susan	TV movie
2000	Marriage Acts	Jean McKinnon	TV movie
2012	Spirit-ED	Miss Judy	Short film

== Theatre ==
=== As actor ===
Year	Title	Role	Notes
1984	Strictly Ballroom	Jenny Ferguson	NIDA, Sydney
1984	Holiday Makers	Yulia	NIDA, Sydney
1984	Three French Farces: Impromptu at Versailles	Mrs du Parc	NIDA, Sydney
1984	All's Well That Ends Well		NIDA, Sydney
1985	Dreamplay		NIDA, Sydney
1985	Chamber Music		NIDA, Sydney
1985	The Greeks trilogy	Athene	NIDA, Sydney & St Martins Youth Arts Centre, Melbourne
1985	Once in a Lifetime		NIDA, Sydney
1986	Much Ado About Nothing	Hero	Shakespeare in the Park
1986	Strictly Ballroom	Jenny Ferguson	Bratislava with Bond Theatre Co.
1987	The Winter Tale	Perdita	Seymour Centre, Sydney with Nimrod Theatre Company
1987	The Golden Age	Angel / Nurse / Maid	Seymour Centre, Sydney with Nimrod Theatre Company
1987	Les Liaisons Dangereuses	Cecile	Seymour Centre, Sydney with Nimrod Theatre Company
1987	Hamlet	Ophelia	Q Theatre, Penrith
1989	Directors' Workshop		The Peter Summerton Foundation
1989	Operation Holy Mountain		Seymour Centre, Sydney with Toe Truck Theatre
1989	Harold in Italy	Julia	Sydney Opera House Drama Theatre with Sydney Theatre Company
1994	Table for One?	Jenny	Ensemble Theatre, Sydney with Hunter Valley Theatre Company for Sydney Festival
2005	Love Letters		Parade Theatre, NIDA
2007	ALP Arts Election Launch		Riverside Theatres Parramatta
2014	A Murder Is Announced	Leititia Blacklock	Mousetrap Productions Ltd
2014	Worst Kept Secrets	Annie Steeper	Bontom Productions
2017	Cold Light	Edith Campbell Berry	Street Theatre, Sydney
2020	Rules for Living	Edith	Sydney Opera House Drama Theatre with Sydney Theatre Company

=== As crew ===
Year	Title	Role	Notes
1986	Ridin' High: the Ethel Merman Story	Choreographer	Stables Theatre, Sydney with Griffin Theatre Company.
