= List of Home and Away characters introduced in 2010 =

Home and Away is an Australian television soap opera. It was first broadcast on the Seven Network on 17 January 1988. The following is a list of characters that first appeared during 2010, by order of first appearance. They were all introduced by series producer Cameron Welsh. The 23rd season of Home and Away began airing from 25 January 2010. Two days later Mitzi Ruhlman made her debut as Rabbit. Mink Carpenter and Elijah Johnson arrived in February, while Justin Jefferies began appearing from March. Mink's mother, Jill, arrived in May. Christian Clark and Rhiannon Fish began portraying Penn Graham and April Scott from June. April's older sister, Bianca, made her debut in July, while Paolo Rosetta was introduced to the show in August. The following month Mitzy Fraser, Vittorio Seca, Daria Hennessy were introduced to the show.

== Rabbit ==
Rabbit
- Home and Away character
- Portrayed by: Mitzi Ruhlman
- First appearance: 27 January 2010
- Last appearance: 5 May 2010
- Introduced by: Cameron Welsh
In-universe information
- Other names: Amber Copeland
- Father: Miles Copeland
- Mother: Louise Copeland
- Grandfathers: Aaron Copeland
- Grandmothers: Diana Wilson
- Aunts: Sally Fletcher
- First cousins: Pippa Saunders

Amber "Rabbit" Copeland, played Mitzi Ruhlman, made her first screen appearance on 27 January 2010. Rabbit was Ruhlman's first television role. The character was introduced to help bring "a little fun" back into Miles Copeland's (Josh Quong Tart) life. When asked how the idea for Rabbit came about, Tart revealed "I was very keen to get a bit more magic into the character of Miles. He came in with a great sense of magic and I think we wanted to capture that again." The actor explained that the concept of Miles having Rabbit in his life brings all sorts of questions about psychology and mental illness in the equation. He added that the storyline was something young children could enjoy because Rabbit is "feisty and mischievous" and there is an innocence to it all.

Rabbit appears to a hungover Miles Copeland, after he spends the night on the beach. She later appears at Summer Bay House and tells him she is staying for a while. During a game of cards, Rabbit tells Miles of her visions of fire and people hiding under tables. Miles does not take her seriously, but when he arrives at the Pier Diner, he finds the place under siege from drunks who have set it alight. Rabbit is visibly shaken, but Miles convinces her the visions are a good thing. She later tells Miles he will die if he falls asleep. After falling asleep at school, Miles is nearly killed by a ceiling fan. A spate of graffiti attacks occur in the Bay, including at the Caravan Park and Surf Club. Miles notices the writing is done in Amber and spots Rabbit. When he catches up with her, she denies doing anything. Marilyn Chambers (Emily Symons) begins having strange dreams involving Rabbit dressed as a rabbit eating a carrot. Rabbit tells her that Miles is unwell and then presents her a vision of her late son, Byron Fisher (Nathianiel Davey) at the age of eleven. Rabbit also tells Marilyn that she will die too.

Marilyn has another dream involving Rabbit being drenched in water. She awakes and finds Miles adding graffiti onto a van in the park and realises Rabbit's real name is Amber. Miles confesses that Rabbit is actually his daughter, who died in the Boxing Day Tsunami five years earlier along with her mother, Louise. He has been seeing visions of her for several months. After Miles visits Michael Patton (Jack Campbell) for a psychiatric assessment, he is prescribed some medication, but Rabbit begs him not to take it. However, Miles takes the pills and Rabbit disappears for a while. She reappears when he stops taking the medication. Miles struggles to keep Rabbit's visions quiet resulting in an outburst at school, which gets him suspended. Rabbit has another premonition involving Elijah Johnson (Jay Laga'aia), Leah Patterson-Baker (Ada Nicodemou) and several school children in danger on an excursion. She and Miles then discover the group are unconscious due to an exposed gas main on the site. Miles manages to break down the door and save them. Miles and Rabbit part ways on the beach, after he sees a vision of Louise at the water's edge and goes towards her. Rabbit stops him and states that her mother will look after her and she heads to the sea, disappearing from Miles' life.

A reporter from the Daily Record praised Rabbit because they believed that Home and Away lacked "a spooky little girl called Rabbit". They added that "ever since she first appeared the show has been terrific". The episode featuring Miles finally letting go of his visions of Rabbit won the Australian Writers' Guild Award for "Best Episode in a Television Serial" in 2010 and was presented to the episode's writer, Sam Meikle.

== Mink Carpenter ==
Mink Carpenter
- Home and Away character
- Portrayed by: Matylda Buczko
- Duration: 2010-2011
- First appearance: 1 February 2010
- Last appearance: 17 November 2011
- Introduced by: Cameron Welsh
In-universe information
- Occupation: Surfer
- Mother: Jill Carpenter
- Brothers: Romeo Smith

Mink Smith (previously Carpenter), played by Matylda Buczko, made her first screen appearance on 1 February 2010. Buczko shared the same agent as Luke Mitchell and he suggested that they both move to Sydney to look for work. Mitchell won the role of Romeo Smith within a week of moving to the city, while Buczko auditioned for the role of a goth rock chick. She did not receive the part, but was asked back to audition for Mink, a professional surfer and Romeo's sister. Buczko commented that it felt weird to be playing Mitchell's on screen sister. The actress decided to "hit the gym" after getting the role and Mitchell advised her to take surfing lessons, so she would pass as a pro surfer. Buczko reprised her role for a brief guest stint in November 2011.

Mink was a top surfer, who had just left juvie for an unknown crime, when she arrived in Summer Bay. Buczko explained "I always said, if I ever did Home and Away, I'd love to have a character who was a bit of a stirrer. I like to cause trouble, and I'm a bit fiery and feisty at times, and I do like to have a bit of mischief in my life." Describing her character, Buczko stated that Mink is feisty but quite fragile. She has been separated from Romeo for a few years and comes to the Bay to find him. Catherine Woulfe from Stuff.co.nz called Mink "mysterious" and a "stroppy surf chick". She added "Mink's hot, with plenty of sass and street smarts, and maybe even a soft heart under her bad-girl exterior." Mink unexpectedly returns to the Bay a year later and asks Romeo for money.

Mink arrives in Summer Bay looking for her brother, Romeo Smith. It is revealed that she has served time in juvenile detention for killing their abusive stepfather, after taking the blame for Jill (Josephine Mitchell), Their mother who really killed him. Xavier Austin (David Jones-Roberts) invites Mink to stay with him and his mother, Gina (Sonia Todd). She steals some money belonging to Xavier's brother, Hugo (Bernard Curry), which is stashed in a box in his bedroom. However, Mink later has a change of heart after being admonished by Romeo and returns the money. She then shares a kiss with Xavier and tells Ruby Buckton (Rebecca Breeds), Xavier's ex-girlfriend. Mink is upset when Xavier lets Ruby and Gina know about her past, but she forgives him before leaving the Bay. Mink returns the following year and borrows $2,000 from Romeo, much to the annoyance of his wife, Indigo Walker (Samara Weaving). Mink enters a surfing competition and performs badly, almost drowning in the process. One of the other competitors tells Romeo that Mink has been turning up to competitions drunk and has been struggling for a while. He later learns that she has Ménière's disease and will never be able to surf competitively again. Indi asks Mink to stay, but she departs, leaving a note for Romeo.

== Elijah Johnson ==
Elijah Johnson, played by Jay Laga'aia, made his first appearance on 11 February 2010. Laga'aia's casting was announced in November 2009 into the serial to play a new local reverend, Elijah Johnson. Elijah was introduced as a potential love interest for established character Leah Patterson-Baker (Ada Nicodemou). Laga'aia left the serial in 2010 but co-star Nicodemou later called for Laga'aia's character to return to the serial. Laga'aia had agreed to rejoin the cast Home and Away and returned to filming at the end of the month. Laga'aia described Elijah as not being a typical Reverend and when you see him in normal clothing people would mistake him for a rugby player. In February 2012, Colin Vickery of the Herald Sun reported Laga'aia had finished filming with Home and Away the previous year. Inside Soap asked its readers to decide who their favourite "clergyman" was in a poll which Elijah gained the lowest number of votes, receiving nine percent of the poll.

== Justin Jefferies ==
Justin Jefferies
- Home and Away character
- Portrayed by: Matthew Walker
- First appearance: 19 March 2010
- Last appearance: 6 May 2010
- Introduced by: Cameron Welsh
In-universe information
- Father: Larry Jefferies
- Brothers: Sean Jefferies; Aden Jefferies
- Grandfathers: Stan Jefferies
- First cousins: Simon Jefferies

Justin Jefferies, played by Matthew Walker, made his first screen appearance on 19 March 2010. He was introduced as the brother of established character Aden Jefferies (Todd Lasance). The actor and Justin's first scenes were with the character Marilyn Chambers (Emily Symons). Walker told a reporter from the official Home and Away website that it was his first day of "filming in the middle of the bush" at 5 am. Walker was pleased to work alongside Symons for his initial scenes because he saw her as a "legend".

A writer from TV Week reported that producers had considered offering Walker a contract with the show to have Justin featured in a recurring capacity. A representative for the show said that bosses were "impressed" with the work he put into the role.

Justin is Aden's older brother. He arrives when Marilyn finds him bloodied, dazed and confused. Marilyn takes Justin to hospital and he recovers. He regains his memory of being in a car accident but little else. Justin visits Aden much to his surprise as the brothers have not seen each other for a long time and tells him he is in the army and encourages him to enlist, which Aden rejects due to their war veteran grandfather, Stan molesting him as a child. It is later revealed that Justin was responsible for the death of his and Aden's father, Larry (Paul Gleeson) in the accident. He wants to contact the police but Aden suggests they bury the body. They do so but Justin confesses and Aden moves the body and tells the police he found Larry alone. The brothers face a charge of conspiracy to commit murder but Morag Bellingham (Cornelia Frances) successfully defends them and the prosecution drop the case. Aden and Justin then leave for the city without telling anybody.

== Jill Carpenter ==
Jill Carpenter
- Home and Away character
- Portrayed by: Josephine Mitchell
- First appearance: 14 May 2010
- Last appearance: 29 June 2010
- Introduced by: Cameron Welsh
In-universe information
- Sons: Romeo Smith
- Daughters: Mink Carpenter

Jill Carpenter, played by Josephine Mitchell, made her first screen appearance on 14 May 2010. The character and casting was announced on 8 March 2010. Mitchell previously appeared in the soap in 1990 as Jane Holland. A journalist for The Sydney Morning Herald reported Mitchell's scenes as the "troubled mother" of Romeo Smith (Luke Mitchell) would be broadcast mid-year.

Jill is a "high functioning alcoholic" who spends her entire day drinking, but still attempts to lead a "normal life". While being interviewed on The Morning Show Mitchell revealed that "it's not something I do personally, just to let everybody know, but it's a wonderful layer for a character. I like complexity. I like trying to do subtext at the same time as doing the words." Mitchell researched alcoholism in preparation for the role to learn how it affects other people and what Jill would be able to do during the state of intoxication. Sue Yeap from The West Australian described Jill as "a flirtatious, fun-loving woman". She is "cashed up" from the life insurance payout that she received following her abusive husband's death and often uses the money to buy alcohol. Jill comes to Summer Bay to re-establish her relationship with her son. Although Romeo loves his mother, he is often humiliated by her actions and just wants her to be normal. Over time he has become the adult in their relationship.

Mitchell told Yeap that the storyline between Jill and Romeo was very character driven, explained "Even though the underlying issue is the alcoholism it was very much the relationship between Romeo and his mother and how her relationship with others filters through the community." When Jill is rejected by John Palmer (Shane Withington), she relapses. Luke Mitchell explained that Romeo feels responsible because he was not supportive of her potential relationship with John. Jill becomes depressed when John chooses Gina Austin (Sonia Todd) over her and she feels the only way she can cope is to "drink herself into oblivion." Romeo turns to Irene Roberts (Lynne McGranger) for help, as she knows what Jill is going through. The actor revealed "Irene's also an alcoholic, she gets it completely. She thinks Jill needs to hit rock bottom before she can admit she has a problem. As long as Romeo's there to pick up the pieces, Jill will keep drinking." Romeo decides not to help Jill the next time she gets drunk, telling her to ruin her life if she wants.

Jill arrives in Summer Bay looking for Romeo. He refuses to see her after having the latest letter he sent her returned to him unopened. Romeo is annoyed when he learns that Jill has been spending his stepfather's life insurance and angered further when Alf Stewart (Ray Meagher) and Marilyn Chambers (Emily Symons) bring a drunken Jill home. She offers him a cheque for $50,000, but he tears it up and tells her it is too late to make amends. John Palmer and Irene Roberts offer Jill support and she accepts, leaning on John in particular. Jill's friendship with John causes friction with Gina Austin leading Romeo to fall out with Gina's son, Xavier (David Jones-Roberts). After realising the damage she has caused, Jill promises Romeo she will attend an AA Meeting, which he is pleased about. However, Romeo discovers Jill has the left the bay the following morning.

== Penn Graham ==
Penn Graham
- Home and Away character
- Portrayed by: Christian Clark; Cameron Ealey (flashback)
- Duration: 2010–11
- First appearance: 14 June 2010
- Last appearance: 7 February 2011
- Introduced by: Cameron Welsh
In-universe information
- Mother: Tulip O'Hare
- Sons: George
- Grandfathers: Douglas Graham

Penn Tiberius Graham, played by Christian Clark, made his first screen appearance on 14 June 2010. The character and Clark's casting was announced on 7 June 2010 by a reporter from The Advertiser. The reporter described Penn as "a mysterious stranger who comes to town and sets hearts aflutter from the second he arrives." The reporter revealed that Clark was booked on a flight to Los Angeles when he was offered the role of Penn. After reading the scripts, he realised he wanted to take on the part and he cancelled his plans to leave the country. Clark stated "Penn is the epitome of cool - he says and does things I wish I could in real life. Full credit to the writers and producers for creating such a great dynamic character...I just hope I can do him justice."

A Holy Soap reporter revealed that Penn had a connection to Summer Bay through his father. A writer for Yahoo!7 described Penn as having an "unmistakable sexual fire to him" and a bravado of not seeming to care about anything. The writer observed that this made him more attractive. The writer also called an enigma, explained that he kept things to himself and no one knew where he had come from or who he had relationships with. Penn had an "entirely devilish" attitude and he possessed a "glint in his eye" that made everyone aware of when he was stirring up trouble. Clark said that when he received his scripts he was always "shocked, excited and nervous" about what was planned for Penn. Clark warned the audience that his character would confuse and shock them, just like Penn did to himself. Clark felt that there were no other character resembling Penn in the show at the time, and he believed that he would need to research some archetypical "cool" figures such as actors James Dean and Steve McQueen. Clark added that Penn's way of being cool was saying and doing what he wants.

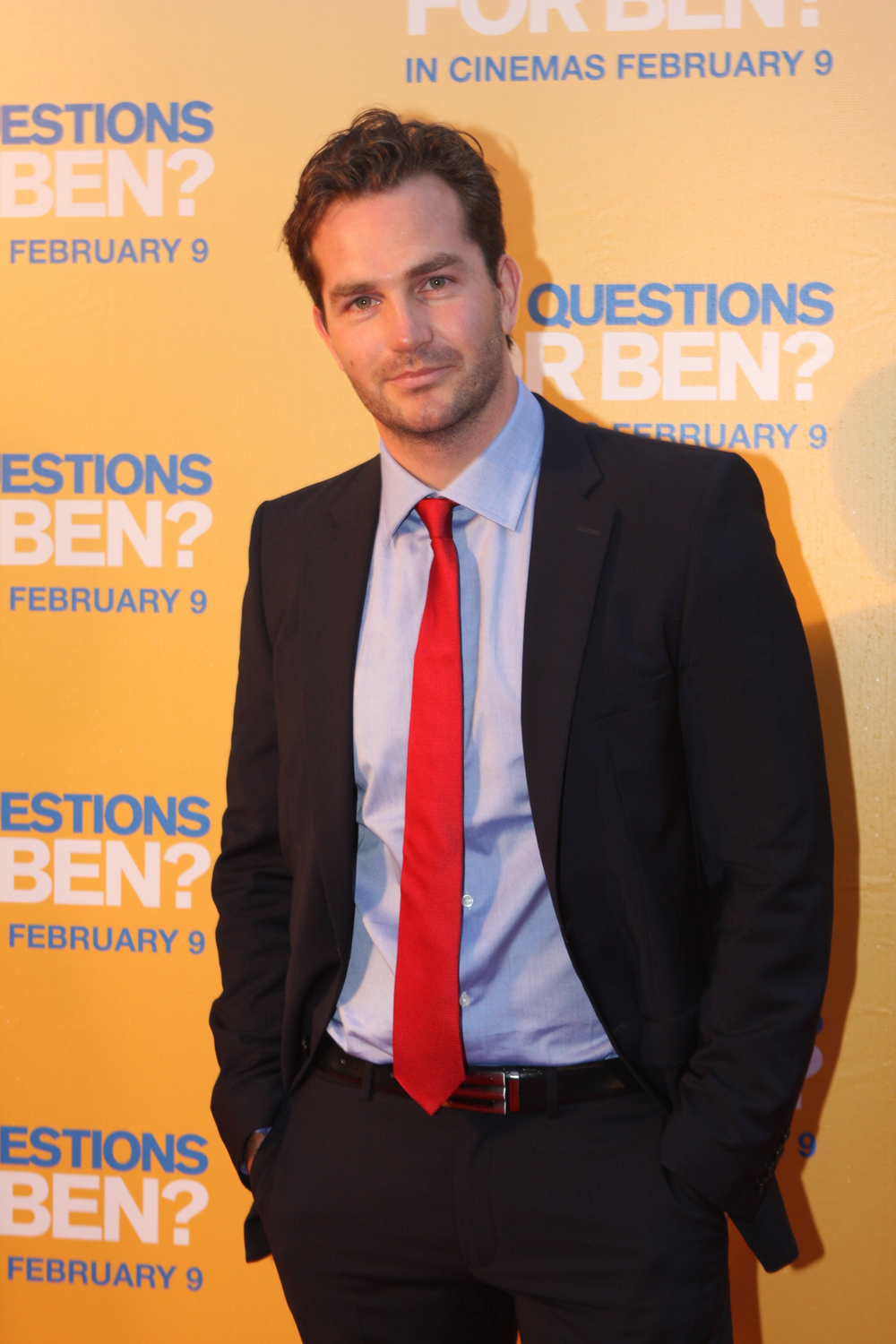
Christian Clark portrayed Penn.

Shortly before Penn was introduced, TV Week's Carolyn Stewart revealed he would develop a relationship with Nicole Franklin (Tessa James). Clark admitted "Nicole and Penn hit it off very quickly. The first scene I shot was on Palm Beach, with the sun setting as I was kissing her. I was thinking 'Damn, it doesn't get better than this!'" Clark opined that Nicole had an appealing sense of "vulnerability" about herself. Penn has never seen this in a girl before and so it was endearing to him. On 5 October 2010, Daniel Kilkelly from Digital Spy reported Penn would be at the centre of another mystery when he disappears in suspicious circumstances. After engaging in a number of "heated clashes" with Summer Bay residents, Penn goes missing and a pool of blood is found in his hotel room. Kilkelly revealed "In the aftermath of his disappearance, it will be unclear whether Penn left town of his own accord or whether there is a more sinister explanation." Meagher thought Alf would become "a likely suspect" if anything happened to Penn. Nicole, John Palmer (Shane Withington), Miles Copeland (Josh Quong Tart), Marilyn Chambers (Emily Symons) and Sid Walker (Robert Mammone) were also named as suspects.

Penn arrives in Summer Bay and Nicole is immediately attracted to him. They begin dating but Romeo Smith (Luke Mitchell) spots Penn kissing Hayley Doven (Bonnie Sveen) and tells Nicole. Nicole downplays it but is visibly uncomfortable with Penn seeing someone else. Penn later causes trouble in town when he frames Colleen Smart (Lyn Collingwood) for theft by planting several items, including his own wallet in her mobile home, leading to her arrest. He also creates friction by telling Nicole that Sid Walker still has feelings for her. Miles Copeland and Marilyn Chambers try to convince Nicole that Penn is lying, but she will not listen. Penn is then evicted from the Caravan Park.

Penn apologises to Nicole on the beach and hides a syringe in the sand which pierces Nicole's hand when she places her hand on it. Penn takes her to the hospital to get checked out and comforts her. Nicole takes a HIV test and gets some anti-viral medication. While out at dinner, Penn admits to planting the needle but refuses to confirm whether it was infected or not. Nicole then finishes with Penn. Shortly after Penn is beaten up and hospitalised. Alf Stewart (Ray Meagher) is a prime suspect after a heated argument but is exonerated when Penn admits it wasn't him but some guys who wanted a ride. It emerges that Penn is the son of Tulip O'Hare (Kimberley Hews), a woman who Alf had an affair with in 1987, two years after the death of his wife Martha (Alison Mulvaney). Tulip was in love with Alf, but after Penn saw them together, he ended the affair and Tulip committed suicide by overdosing on diazepam. Penn blames Alf for his mother's death and he begins taunting him. He later disappears and blood is found in his hotel room, but no body.

Several weeks later Penn's body washes up on the beach and Alf is the prime suspect after several witnesses heard him threaten to kill Penn. Alf is remanded in custody for six weeks and eventually released. Will Smith (Zac Drayson) reveals he stabbed Penn in self-defence and Daria Hennessy (Samantha Tolj) helped him dispose of the body. Will is then arrested following his confession. Nicole later gives birth to Penn's son, George.

A writer for Holy Soap stated that Penn's most memorable moment was "Getting to grips with teen temptress Nicole." A Sunday Mercury writer called Penn a "mysterious, nasty newcomer". After Penn was murdered, a reporter for the Daily Record commented "H&A bosses have dragged this murder investigation out longer than the latest loveless spell in Leah's romantic life". Channel 5 included Penn's murder in their "Top 20 Aussie Soap Moments of 2011" program.

== April Scott ==
April Scott, played by Rhiannon Fish, made her first on screen appearance on 15 June 2010. The character and Fish's casting was announced on 23 May 2010. Fish told a writer for the official Home and Away website that she began filming a week after she won the role. Shortly before she arrived on screen, April was described as being "worldly, intelligent and quick witted." A reporter from the Metro commented that April was "fun-loving", while Fish branded her a passionate and unique character. April and her older sister, Bianca (Lisa Gormley), have a fiery, but supportive relationship.

== Bianca Scott ==
Bianca Scott, played by Lisa Gormley, made her first screen appearance on 9 July 2010. Shortly after Gormley graduated from the National Institute of Dramatic Art, she landed the role of Bianca. The character was created as a sister for April Scott (Rhiannon Fish). Gormley described Bianca as being "the kind of woman every girl wishes she had the confidence to be". She revealed that Bianca has a feisty persona, which is a front to hide her "softer side". A Channel 5 website writer called Bianca "strong, opinionated and beautiful". Bianca comes to Summer Bay to get over a broken heart. She later begins a relationship with Liam Murphy (Axle Whitehead). For her portrayal of Bianca, Gormley was included on the long-list for the Most Popular New Female Talent award at the 2011 Logie Awards.

== Paulie Rosetta ==
Paulie Rosetta
- Home and Away character
- Portrayed by: Ryan Johnson
- First appearance: 24 August 2010
- Last appearance: 23 September 2010
- Introduced by: Cameron Welsh
In-universe information
- Occupation: Restaurant owner
- Mother: Carla Rosetta
- Brothers: Angelo Rosetta

Paolo "Paulie" Rosetta, played by Ryan Johnson, made his first screen appearance on 24 August 2010. The character and Johnson's casting was announced shortly before he arrived. Daniel Kilkelly of Digital Spy reported Paulie is Angelo Rosetta's (Luke Jacobz) younger brother and he surprises him by turning up in Summer Bay. Kilkelly commented "It soon becomes clear that there's an agenda behind Paulie's sudden appearance and he wants Angelo's help - but, with bad blood between the brothers, will he get what he's looking for?" A writer for Holy Soap revealed that the reason for the brothers' bad relationship was down to an accident in which Paulie started a fire at his parents' restaurant. Angelo took the blame and was subsequently kicked out of the family business. Paulie was later left in charge, but "bit off more than he could chew".

Talking to TV Week's Carolyn Stewart, Johnson described Paulie as being the "starry-eyed dreamer in the family". His ideas have often led him into trouble and he acts before he thinks. The actor continued "Ever since they were kids, Paulie's done crazy things - and Angelo has had to bail him out." Angelo is "less than thrilled" to see his brother, especially when he tries to charm his girlfriend, Charlie Buckton (Esther Anderson). He also knows that Paulie has only shown up because things are not going well. Johnson explained "If Paulie's in town, there has to be some sort of agenda. Angelo's waiting for the truth to come out." A Daily Record reporter called Paulie a smooth-talker and said he laid on the "charm thick and fast".

When he arrives in Summer Bay, Paulie is mistaken for a food critic by Irene Roberts (Lynne McGranger) and Colleen Smart (Lyn Collingwood). He eventually catches up with his brother, Angelo, who is not pleased to see him. Angelo resents Paulie due to him inheriting the family restaurant. Paulie reveals that he is in trouble with some loan sharks and owes $30,000. Angelo agrees to bail him out, despite being in debt himself. Charlie Buckton offers Paulie a loan, from money that Xavier Austin (David Jones-Roberts) does not want, which angers Angelo as he knows it is illegal. Charlie changes her mind and Angelo tells Paulie to ask the loan sharks for more time. However, they threaten to set fire to Angelo's restaurant if they do not get their money on time. Angelo and Paulie lay down a bet at the races and they win. Paulie then decides to bet again and he loses the money. Angelo learns Paulie used their parents' business as collateral and he tells them what is going on. Charlie explains to Paulie that his brother just wants him to take responsibility for the restaurant fire and his finances. Paulie and Angelo's parents offer to pay off Paulie's debts. They brothers continue to fight, but eventually make up and Angelo drives Paulie back home to the city.

== Mitzy Fraser ==
Mitzy Fraser
- Home and Away character
- Portrayed by: Helen Dallimore
- First appearance: 3 September 2010
- Last appearance: 7 October 2010
- Introduced by: Cameron Welsh
In-universe information
- Occupation: Psychic

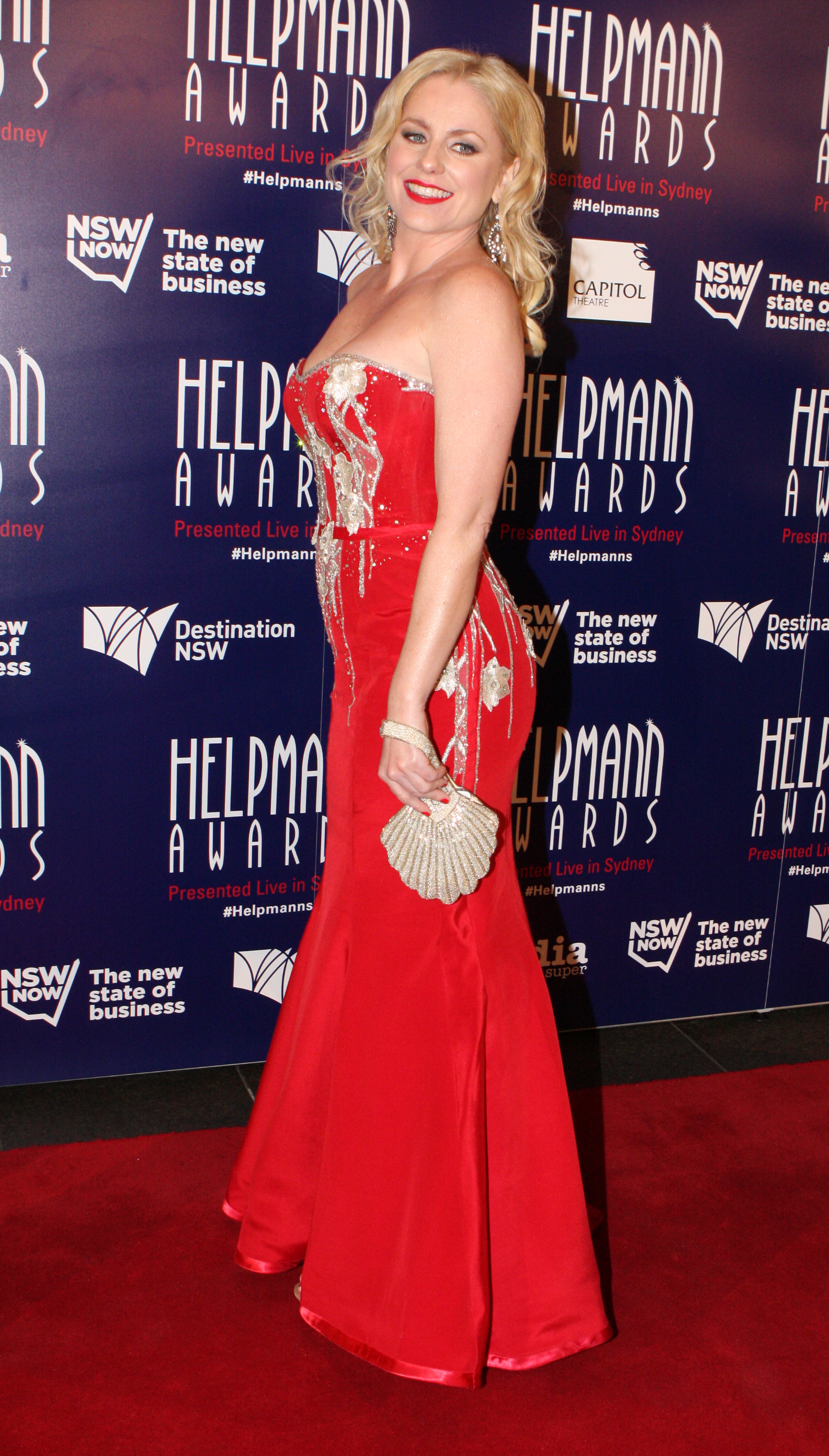
Helen Dallimore portrayed Mitzy Fraser.

Mitzy Fraser, played by Helen Dallimore, made her first screen appearance on 3 September 2010. Mitzy is a psychic who befriended Marilyn Chambers (Emily Symons) and offered her spiritual guidance when she was grieving for her son and fighting cancer. Mitzy comes to Summer Bay after having a vision about Marilyn's death. However, Mitzy's "gloomy predictions" do not go down well with Sid Walker (Robert Mammone). Describing Mitzy, Dallimore stated "She is Marilyn's best friend from London, a bit of a loner because she is a psychic and she has been stigmatised. People are skeptical and they tend to not believe her, but in Marilyn she has found a believer and a kindred soul." Mitzy later suffers a fatal stroke during a disagreement with Marilyn, when she is confronted about her "dodgy" predictions. On her death bed she tells Marilyn that she made up her end date prediction, however she tells Sid the exact opposite. Yvette Chegwidden from TV Week called Mitzy "kooky".

Mitzy comes to Summer Bay House to see Marilyn Chambers and reveals that she knows exactly when she is going to die. Marilyn's partner, Sid Walker, dismisses Mitzy's prediction and confronts her about her abilities. Romeo Smith (Luke Mitchell) asks Mitzy's advice about whether to have sex with his girlfriend and she gives him a cryptic answer. Mitzy learns Dexter Walker (Charles Cottier) has feelings for Marilyn and she tries to make him see that Marilyn does not have any for him. When Dexter becomes defensive, Mitzy kisses him to show him that it is not okay to push himself onto other people. Marilyn becomes upset with Mitzy and she feels bad for affecting her friend's relationship. Mitzy tells Marilyn that her end date is only a couple of months away, leaving her devastated. Sid later asks Mitzy to stop ruining Marilyn's life.

When Mitzy feels sick after a meal, she reveals to Marilyn that she has lung cancer and is dying. That same evening Mitzy walks home from the Diner with Dex and collapses. Sid informs Mitzy that she has an inoperable brain tumour and only has weeks to live. Sid accuses Mitzy of scamming Marilyn with her end date prediction and he stands down as her doctor. After leaving the hospital, Mitzy tells Ruby Buckton (Rebecca Breeds) that she will find love within the next two months, but later admits to Nicole Franklin (Tessa James) that she made the prediction up. Marilyn overhears the conversation and when she starts to question whether Mitzy made up her end date, Mitzy has a stroke. At the hospital, Marilyn apologises and Mitzy tells her that she lied about her end date. However, Mitzy then tells Sid that she did not make it up and she dies.

== Vittorio Seca ==
Vittorio Seca
- Home and Away character
- Portrayed by: Richard Brancatisano
- First appearance: 17 September 2010
- Last appearance: 25 November 2010
- Introduced by: Cameron Welsh

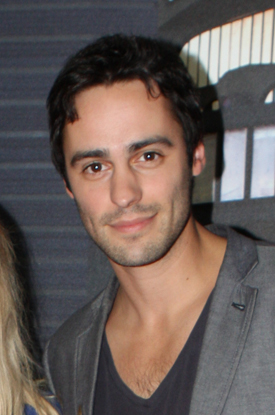
Richard Brancatisano played Vittorio Seca.

Prince Vittorio Seca, played by Richard Brancatisano, made his first screen appearance on 17 September 2010. Brancatisano previously appeared in Home and Away in a minor role in 2002 and as Theo Barrett in 2007. Vittorio is an Italian Prince and Bianca Scott's (Lisa Gormley) ex-fiancé. He cheated on her back in Italy, causing her to return home to Australia. Vittorio comes to Summer Bay seeking forgiveness and he tries to win Bianca back. However, he gets caught up in a love triangle with her and Liam Murphy (Axle Whitehead). Of Vittorio, a Sunday Mercury reporter commented "Fancy having a suave man called Prince Vittorio at your beck and call."

Vittorio is Bianca Scott's ex-fiancé who tries to win her back after he cheated on her. Vittorio refuses to give up after being rejected by Bianca and she eventually relents. He proposes to her and she accepts. Vittorio warns Liam Murphy to stay away from Bianca, as he believes he still has feelings for her. On the day of their wedding, Bianca realises she still loves Liam and jilts Vittorio at the altar. Vittorio grabs Bianca and tries to drag her back, but Romeo Smith (Luke Mitchell) punches him. Vittorio then leaves the Bay.

== Daria Hennessy ==
Daria Hennessy
- Home and Away character
- Portrayed by: Samantha Tolj
- Duration: 2010–11
- First appearance: 30 September 2010
- Last appearance: 7 February 2011
- Introduced by: Cameron Welsh
In-universe information
- Other names: Shandi Ayres

Daria Hennessy, played by Samantha Tolj, made her first screen appearance on 30 September 2010. The character was called Shandi Ayres upon her introduction, but as the storyline developed it was eventually revealed that her real name was Daria. Tolj auditioned for the role and she revealed that Shandi was described to her as someone who "lives her life one day at a time". Tolj stated that she loved playing Shandi and working on Home and Away. She told an interviewer for the official website "the whole cast were so welcoming, they're just warm friendly people who are really good at their craft and the crew and directors are amazing. It was beautiful to work with Danny Raco (who played Leah's brother Alex) as a director, because we have worked alongside each other as actors, so it was really nice to have him directing my first block as Shandi."

Tolj described Shandi as being "very direct", "warm hearted" and someone who "is not afraid to say what she thinks". She is a hippy, who comes to town to find her father. Tolj later told a TV Week writer, "She's a really coulourful, lively, free-spirited hippie who takes each day as it comes." The first person Daria meets is Angelo Rosetta (Luke Jacobz) and he is "wowed" by her. Tolj added that Daria also makes an impression on the other men of Summer Bay. Shandi starts a relationship with Miles Copeland (Josh Quong Tart) and a reporter for TV Week described them as a "kooky" pairing. The relationship only lasts a few weeks. Quong Tart commented that Miles "couldn't believe his luck" when he got together with Shandi. He thought they were compatible because she was "beachy and hippy" and like Miles, she enjoyed talking about the meaning of life.

Daria is a con artist who uses her friend, Shandi's (Elizabeth Blackmore), identity. Her van breaks down on the way to Summer Bay and Angelo Rosetta offers her a lift. Daria flirts with him and he is tempted to reciprocate. She later has brief relationship with Miles Copeland. Daria convinces John Palmer (Shane Withington) that she is his long-lost daughter. Daria begins dating Will Smith (Zac Drayson), which upsets his daughter Lily (Charlie-Rose MacLennan). Daria later leaves town. A few weeks later, Daria is tracked down and arrested for fraud by Charlie Buckton (Esther Anderson) and Angelo. They question her for information on Penn Graham's (Christian Clark) murder and it is revealed that Penn attacked her, but Will stabbed him. He and Daria then disposed of Penn's body in the sea.

== Others ==
Date(s)	Character	Actor	Circumstances
27 January	Priest	Gary Woods	Priest presides over the funeral service of Hugo Austin (Bernard Curry).
1 February	Drunks	Dean Jeffrey	The racist drunks accuse Hazem Kassir (Ben Kermode) of being a terrorist and attack him, along with several of their friends. They then set the pier diner alight.
1 February	Drunks	Joshua Griffin	The racist drunks accuse Hazem Kassir (Ben Kermode) of being a terrorist and attack him, along with several of their friends. They then set the pier diner alight.
3 February	Patrick Grady	Gary Woods	Patrick reports on the aftermath of the Australia Day riots that took place outside of the Pier Diner. His superior, Kristina Cantar (Mel Grob), asks for a better edit of his report and suggests he interviews Alf Stewart (Ray Meagher).
3 February	Kristina Cantar	Mel Grob	Patrick reports on the aftermath of the Australia Day riots that took place outside of the Pier Diner. His superior, Kristina Cantar (Mel Grob), asks for a better edit of his report and suggests he interviews Alf Stewart (Ray Meagher).
18 February	Nira Kassir	Lenita Vangellis	Nira is Hazem Kassir's (Ben Kermode) mother. She meets Leah Patterson-Baker (Ada Nicodemou) at the hospital, when she comes to visit Hazem, who has been attacked. Nira invites Leah and her son, VJ (Felix Dean), to stay with her and she thanks John Palmer (Shane Withington) for helping Hazem.
8 March–15 April	Britt Hobart	Diana Glenn	Britt teaches Nicole Franklin's (Tessa James) fashion course. She is impressed when Nicole shows her some swimwear designs and allows her to use them. Britt passes Nicole's work off as her own and when Nicole confronts her about it, Britt threatens a defamation of character suit if she tells the truth. Nicole's classmates then stage a walkout, leading Britt to resign.
25 March–13 April	Michael Patton	Jack Campbell	Michael is Charlie Buckton's (Esther Anderson) counsellor. Charlie's boyfriend, Angelo Rosetta (Luke Jacobz), sees them together and suspects they are having an affair. He befriends Michael, but later learns he is just Charlie's counsellor. Michael prescribes Miles Copeland (Josh Quong Tart) some medication when he begins seeing visions of his late daughter, Amber (Mitzi Ruhlman).
21 April–22 June 2011	Bishop Pitt	Danny Adcock	Bishop Pitt is Elijah Johnson's (Jay Laga'aia) superior. He expresses concern about Elijah's relationship with Leah Patterson-Baker (Ada Nicodemou) and tells Elijah he cannot be with her. Eljiah challenges Pitt and wins his blessing. Pitt later tells Elijah he is not wanted at the Church.
5 May	Louise Copeland	Uncredited	Louise is Miles Copeland's (Josh Quong Tart) late wife, who died in the Boxing Day Tsunami in 2004 along with their daughter, Amber (Mitzi Ruhlman). She appears to Miles in a vision on the beach. He attempts to go towards her, but Rabbit stops him, before they both vanish.
27 May–4 June	Killer	Mirko Grillini	Killer is a criminal who arrives in the Bay to gain revenge on Hugo Austin (Bernard Curry). He kidnaps Hugo's brother, Xavier (David Jones-Roberts), their mother, Gina (Sonia Todd), and Martha MacKenzie (Jodi Gordon). Killer attempts to drown them in a water tank, but Hugo manages to escape and runs Killer over. Killer is then knocked unconscious by Tony Holden (Jon Sivewright) and arrested. He is interrogated by Gordon Eaves (Lewis Fitz-Gerald) at the police station and he starts a fight with him. Eaves is forced to shoot him dead.
4–9 June	Gordon Eaves	Lewis Fitz-Gerald	Senior Detective Eaves investigates Killer (Mirko Grillini) and Hugo Austin (Bernard Curry) recognises him as the man he paid off while people smuggling. Eaves later shoots Killer dead during a struggle. He realises Angelo Rosetta (Luke Jacobz) and Charlie Buckton (Esther Anderson) do not trust him and he pursues Hugo and Martha MacKenzie (Jodi Gordon). Eaves prepares to shoot Hugo, but Angelo overpowers him. However, Eaves shoots Hugo in the leg and runs off. He tries to shoot Charlie, but he is foiled by Angelo and hit over the head by Tony Holden (Jon Sivewright). Eaves is then arrested.
4–29 June	Lijuan Johnson	Mémé Thorne	Lijuan is Elijah Johnson's (Jay Laga'aia) adoptive mother. She arrives with her husband Song (Jon-Claire Lee) after learning of their son's engagement to Leah Patterson-Baker (Ada Nicodemou). Lijuan uses traditional Chinese techniques to find out if Leah is compatible for Elijah. She feels they are unsuited after a chain of events, but gives them her blessing.
5–29 June	Song Johnson	Jon-Claire Lee	Song is Elijah Johnson's (Jay Laga'aia) adoptive father.
30 June	Gordon Stewart	Ray Meagher	Gordon is the late father of Morag Bellingham, Alf, Celia, Barbara and Debra Stewart. He appears during a flashback of Alf's fifth birthday. It is revealed Gordon had an affair with Mavis Hickie, resulting in the conception of their daughter, Colleen (Lyn Collingwood).
30 June	Debra Stewart	Madison Hopkins	Debra is Alf Stewart's younger sister who appears in a flashback of his fifth birthday.
30 June	Clown	Troy Carlson	Clown appears in flashbacks of Alf Stewart's (Max Buckley) fifth birthday party. He is hired by Gordon Stewart (Ray Meagher) and he brings along a ventriloquist dummy named Mr. Oddly, which frightens Alf.
8–9 July	Hayley Doven	Bonnie Sveen	Hayley is a caravan park guest who Penn Graham (Christian Clark) convinces to drop theft charges against Colleen Smart (Lyn Collingwood). Hayley is later admitted to hospital after she begins haemorrhaging during labour. Sid Walker (Robert Mammone) tends to her and pretends to be her husband David Stone (Hamish Briggs) in order to comfort her as she dies.
9 July	David Stone	Hamish Briggs	David is the husband of Hayley Doven (Bonnie Sveen). Sid Walker (Robert Mammone) informs him that Hayley died while giving birth to their daughter.
2 September	Councillor Leary	Victor Kline	Councillor Leary is a local councillor who passes John Palmer's (Shane Withington) water bottle proposal. Leary informs John that the money will be taken out of his Highway to Summer Bay project.
10–16 September	Tulip O'Hare	Kimberly Hews	Tulip is Penn Graham's (Christian Clark) mother who appears during flashbacks to 1987. Tulip had an affair with Alf Stewart (Ray Meagher) after the supposed death of his wife, Martha (Alison Mulvaney). Penn witnessed them in an embrace and Alf ended things with Tulip, prompting her to commit suicide by overdosing on Diazepam. Penn discovered her body.
14–15 September	Emmanuelle	Fifi Box	Emmanuelle is the host of the Fashions in the Field competition that Nicole Franklin (Tessa James) and Charlie Buckton (Esther Anderson) enter. When Charlie chases down a pickpocket, Emmanuelle is impressed and declares her the winner.
1–14 October	Adrian Hall	Phoebe Tonkin	Adrian works in a pet store in Yabbie Creek. Dexter Walker (Charles Cottier) purchases a goldfish and returns to the store for pet supplies and asks Adrian out on a date. Adrian accepts and meets Dexter at the surf club. However, he leaves mid-date to ask his sister Indigo (Samara Weaving) for advice. Adrian goes and Dexter finds a note telling him not to contact her again. However, she later agrees to be friends with him.
18 October–4 November	Alexander Pitt	Marcus Jacometti	Alexander is Ruby Buckton's (Rebecca Breeds) driving instructor. When she begins flirting with him, Alex tells her he cannot date a student. He later kisses her, despite having a girlfriend. Ruby confronts Alexander and he initially tells her that he is going break up with his girlfriend. He then turns on her and calls her easy. Charlie Buckton (Esther Anderson) then uses her position of authority to bully Alexander into apologising to her daughter.
19 October–26 November	Detective Graves	Eryn-Jean Norvill	Graves and Robert Robertson (Socrattis Otto) try to solve Penn Graham's (Christian Clark) disappearance. Dexter Walker (Charles Cottier) falls for Graves and goes out of his way to woo her much to her annoyance. However, she accepts a dinner date with him, but uses it to gain information on Penn's murder after his body is washed up on the beach. Graves tells Dexter he needs to get over the need to replace his mother, Jody (Victoria Haralabidou), with relationships with older women.
1–9 November	Nina Bailey	Clare Bowen	Nina is seen with Liam Murphy (Axle Whitehead) when he returns to Summer Bay. Liam introduces Nina as his new girlfriend and they have dinner with Liam's ex, Bianca Scott (Lisa Gormley), and her fiancé, Vittorio Seca (Richard Brancatisano). Nina quickly leaves after she realises Liam is still in love with Bianca.
19–26 November	Joanna Scott	Tara Morice	Joanna is Bianca (Lisa Gormley) and April Scott's (Rhiannon Fish) mother. She arrives for Bianca's wedding to Vittorio Seca (Richard Brancatisano). After Bianca jilts Vittorio in favour of Liam Murphy (Axle Whitehead), Joanna blames April and takes her back to Europe with her.
