= Sasha Bezmel =

Fictional character

- Home and Away character
- Portrayed by: Demi Harman
- Duration: 2011–2015
- First appearance: 31 August 2011
- Last appearance: 1 April 2015
- Introduced by: Cameron Welsh
In-universe information
- Occupation: Waitress (2011–15); Student (2011–)
- Father: Sid Walker
- Mother: Regina Bezmel
- Half-brothers: Felix Bezmel; Dexter Walker
- Half-sisters: Indi Walker

Sasha Bezmel is a fictional character from the Australian Channel Seven soap opera Home and Away, played by Demi Harman. The actress relocated to Sydney from Brisbane for filming and she stated that winning the role was a dream come true. Harman told a reporter that her character forced changes within herself, which she had difficulty adjusting to. Harman made her first screen appearance as Sasha during the episode broadcast on 31 August 2011. Harman decided to leave the show in 2014 and filmed her final scenes in October. Sasha made her official departure on 1 April 2015.

Sasha was introduced as established character Sid Walker's (Robert Mammone) illegitimate daughter. Upon her mother's death, Sasha and her half-brother Felix Bezmel (Max Felice) were orphaned and Sasha had to move to Summer Bay. Sasha was initially "a rebellious and furious teenager". Harman described Sasha as being "sassy" and "angry", as well as having a stubborn streak. Shortly after her arrival, Sasha embarked on a relationship with Stu Henderson (Brenton Thwaites), which eventually turned abusive. Harman admitted that she was both scared and excited about taking on a domestic violence storyline. In February 2012, a whodunnit was formed when Stu was found dead. The Walker family soon became suspects and Sasha was bullied by a group of students led by Christy Clarke (Isabelle Cornish). Sasha soon confessed to killing Stu in self-defence when her father became the prime suspect.

While on the rebound from Stu, Sasha began dating Xavier Austin (David Jones-Roberts). However, the age difference and timing soon caused them to break up and Sasha quickly developed feelings for Casey Braxton (Lincoln Younes). Sasha lost her virginity to Casey and also went through a pregnancy scare. After splitting from Casey, Sasha began dating Spencer Harrington (Andrew Morley). They initially kept the relationship a secret, so they did not hurt Spencer's ex-girlfriend and Sasha's close friend, Maddy Osborne (Kassandra Clementi). In the same year, Sasha befriended Rosie Prichard (Teri Haddy), who became obsessive with Sasha's company and almost caused them both to drown during a stunt to get Sasha's attention. The character of Sasha has been positively received by critics and Harman was nominated for the Most Popular New Female Talent Logie Award in 2012.

== Casting ==
Isabelle Cornish auditioned for the role of Sasha, however, it was actress Demi Harman who was eventually cast. Harman had not long been attending university and relocated from Brisbane to Sydney for filming. Receiving the role was Harman's "dream come true" and she fell in love with her character. While being interviewed by Holly Richards from The West Australian, Harman disclosed to her that the role forced changes in her and adjusting to them was "hell difficult". Harman made her debut screen appearance as Sasha during the episode first broadcast on 31 August 2011.

== Development ==
=== Characterisation ===
Sasha is the illegitimate daughter of Sid Walker (Robert Mammone) and Regina Bezmel. On the serial's official website, Sasha is described as originally coming from "just another working class family" who were "battling along". However, the death of her mother leaves Sasha and her half-brother Felix Bezmel (Max Felice) orphaned. Sid meets Sasha a number of months after her mother's death because there is delay in the contact process. With "months of grieving, misery and building resentment" - Sasha becomes "a rebellious [and] furious teenager". She was also billed as "uncontrollable, naughty and independent". Harman said that liked her character's had a stubborn streak and that face that she is "sassy" and "angry". Sid was initially "just a means to an end" to Sasha because he played no part in her life. She was soon introduced to her older siblings Dexter (Charles Cottier) and Indigo Walker (Samara Weaving). Harman enjoyed working with her on-screen family and even came to think of Weaving as being her second sister. Sasha develops three romantic relationships during her first year in the series. Harman has stated that Sasha uses relationships as a method to convey that she is mature and grown up despite being sixteen.

=== Domestic violence ===
"We've tackled abuse storylines in the past but we haven't done it with such a young character before. [...] It is really a case of presenting it and leaving it open for discussion. Our research tells us Home and Away is watched a lot by mums and teenagers. (That means) we can present an issue like this (domestic violence) at 7 o'clock at night. Families can watch it and then discuss it."

— Producer Cameron Welsh on the storyline (2011)

The serial used Sasha's relationship with Stu Henderson (Brenton Thwaites) to depict the issue of domestic violence. The actress told Erin Miller from TV Week that Sasha is "absolutely smitten" with Stu, despite Dexter's concerns. Sasha just begins dating Stu without carrying out any "groundwork" into who he is. There were no "warning signs" for her and it happened so rapidly that Sasha just "kind of fell into" the relationship. Harman added that he is "very protective" over Sasha, and went on to explain that he is jealous and does not want her to interact with other males. Lachie (Gig Clarke) begins text messaging Sasha and Stu becomes angry, the actress stated that Stu "tries to take Sasha's phone and he questions why she would be texting another guy" and subsequently hits her. Sasha decides to get advice from Ruby Buckton (Rebecca Breeds), but does not tell her the full story. But Sasha decides to end their relationship.

Stu then steals Xavier Austin's (David Jones-Roberts) car and forces Sasha to get into it. He threatens that he shall do something "extreme" if she does not forgive him. Harman said that "he is out of control and Sasha feels like she has no choice but to get in the car even, though she is scared." Stu's anger issues are revealed to her at a "very fast rate" but there are "elements of ignorance" because she is not willing to accept the predicament. Harman opined that it could be "dangerous" for her character if she becomes embroiled in a cycle of forgiveness. One of the reasons she puts up with Stu is because she is not fully over the death of her mother. She concluded that it was a "disaster waiting to happen".

The storyline later came to the centre of the serial. Harman told Daniel Kilkelly from Digital Spy that she was both scared and excited about taking on Sasha's domestic abuse storyline. The actress has anti-violence values and it was "really challenging" for her to portray - but she was grateful for the opportunity to play the victim. Harman researched the issue by visiting a range of anti-abuse blogs and websites such as White Ribbon and The Line. She also learned about the "psychology behind it". Harman explained that the story was "necessary" for Sasha's development and it subsequently scored positive feedback from the audience. There was also praise given to Home and Away for choosing to portray abuse within a teenage relationship. In various scenes the violence that Sasha endures from Stu becomes "quite heavy". Harman stated that she and Thwaites knew it was a "serious" issue and made an effort not to take both their character's state of minds home with them.

Sasha is convinced that Stu will change and forgives him. Harman explained that "I think she reminds herself that as much as Stu hurts her, she genuinely loves him enough to want to help him stop doing what he's doing." Sasha actually sees Stu's "true colours" from the first time he hurts her - but she does not do anything about it. She just carries on letting it happen until it begins happening in public. Harman felt that Sasha's denial was the most "frustrating part" of the scenario. She hoped that anyone in a similar situation to Sasha would seek help and tell someone. When her father, Sid learns the truth he attacks Stu in "intense" scenes. The actress revealed that some characters understand that Sid is trying to protect his daughter. But she added that "it does bring to light in the Summer Bay community the issue of trying to solve violence with violence." Harman later revealed that the storyline had been her favourite so far because it was "epic". Discussing her character's future with a writer from Yahoo!7, she said that "a lot of people" wanted Sasha to grow up and Stu's behaviour would "greatly impact her in the future". Harman hoped that Sasha would eventually find a boyfriend who would treat her "right".

=== Stu's death and bullying ===
In the 2011 series finale, Sid is arrested for violently assaulting Stu in response to discovering his abuse towards Sasha. Harman later revealed that Stu's father Alan Henderson (Peter Phelps) would clash with Sid. In response to Stu's violence the Walker family "form a protective circle" around Sasha. In February 2012, it was announced that Alf Stewart (Ray Meagher) would find Stu's body as the caravan park, sparking a whodunnit storyline. Because of Stu's "chequered history" the police believe that one of the local residents could be responsible for his death and Sasha's father Sid is the prime suspect due to the beating he gave Stu and the AVO that was taken out against him. A reporter from TV Week announced that the entire Walker family would become suspected of the murder when a bloodied shirt is discovered on their property.

Luke Mitchell, who plays Romeo Smith revealed that the actual killer would confess. He added that the storyline would explore whether or not his death was accidental or premeditated. When her father become the prime suspect, Sasha decides to confess that she killed Stu. Mammone told Digital Spy's Kilkelly that Sid is quick to support Sasha because he believes it was an accident. He is "sad and disappointed in himself" because Sasha did not feel safe to trust him with her problems sooner. The family hire Morag Bellingham (Cornelia Frances) for legal support. Sid is frustrated with Sasha because her dishonesty gives the police reason to issue murder charges. Mammone explained "Demi is a lovely girl and a talented actress - she has handled this storyline like a veteran!" He concluded that Sasha's situation would worsen as students who liked Stu target Sasha.

Shortly after it was announced that Isabelle Cornish had been cast as student Christy Clarke, who was good friends with Stu. Cornish explained that Christy had developed a crush on Stu and when she learned that he had died, she became determined to find out who was responsible. After Sasha admits that she killed Stu, Christy lashes out at her and Sasha finds herself victimised at school. Cornish revealed "Christy doesn't like Sasha. Her aim is to destroy her. She tries to get rid of her friends, bully her and make her uncomfortable." The actress added that she had to make herself believe Sasha was a bad person and that she wanted her to feel unhappy. Harman explained that she found it easy to relate to Sasha's bullying storyline, as she herself was bullied at school. The actress said that Sasha does not cope with well with the bullying and it is "definitely a test of her strength and stability."

=== Relationships ===
==== Xavier Austin ====
In January 2012, a writer for TV Week observed that with sparks already flying between Sasha and Xavier, it looked like they would become Home and Away's newest couple over the coming months. Jones-Roberts agreed and stated that when Sasha first came to the Bay she and Xavier clashed nonstop. Xavier likes the "fiery" aspect of the girls he dates and tries to match them. Following Sid's arrest for Stu's murder, Sasha is taunted by some Summer Bay High students in the Diner and Xavier sticks up for her because he feels it is the right thing to do. Through this, Sasha and Xavier develop a friendship. The TV Week writer added "But because Sasha is quite strong-willed, this budding romance could take a while to develop." Sasha also initially rejects him because she feels too "toxic" to begin a relationship. Sasha and Xavier's relationship eventually comes to an end. Harman told The West Australian's Richards that Sasha quickly got together with Xavier while on the rebound from Stu. She believed that Sasha loves him, but the age difference and Xavier not being ready cause the break up. Harman concluded that Sasha is left feeling bitter over Xavier and directly develops feelings for Casey Braxton (Lincoln Younes). The actress also told Susan Hill from the Daily Star that Sasha were more "big storylines" lined up for Sasha.

==== Casey Braxton ====
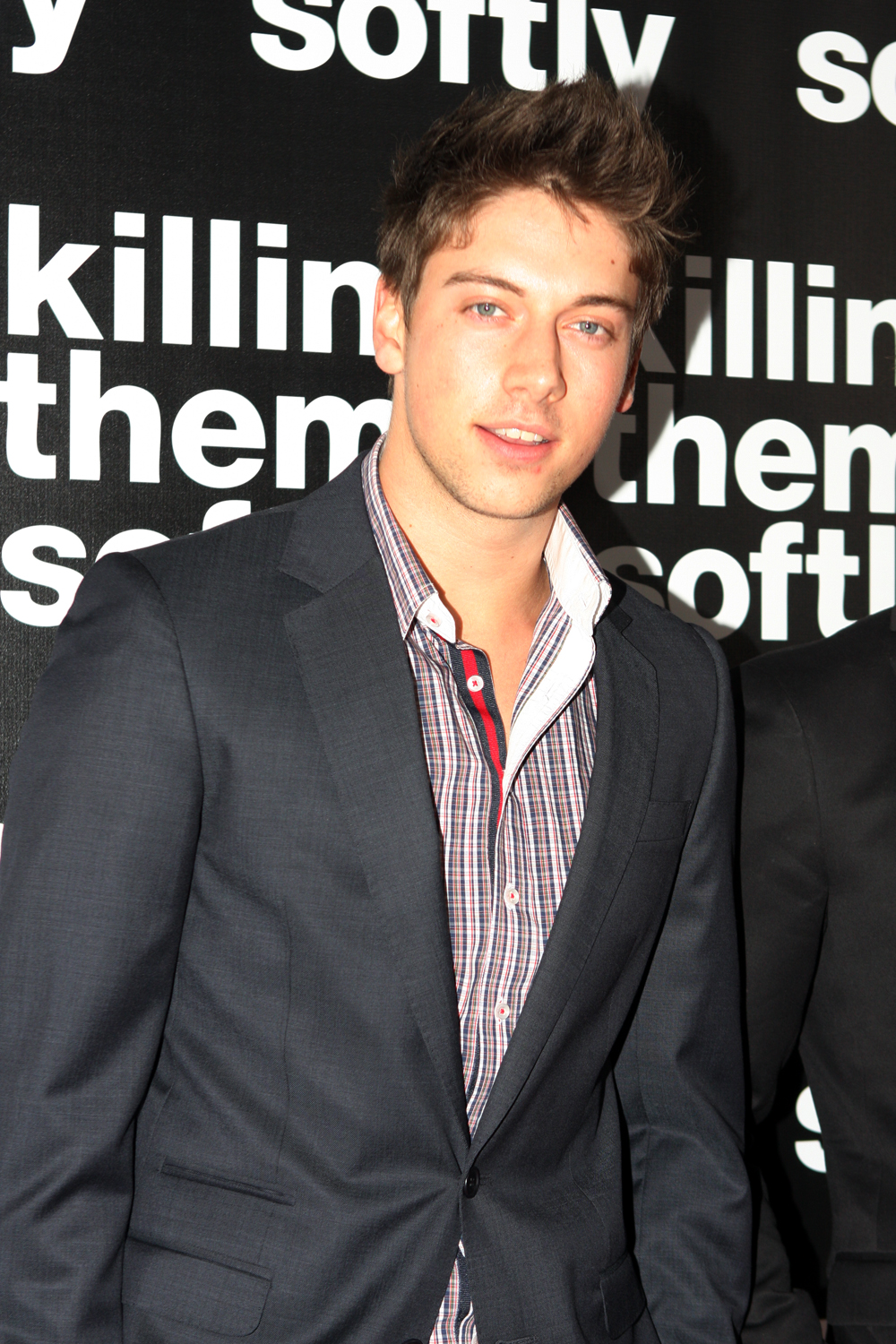
Lincoln Younes plays Sasha's third love interest, Casey Braxton.

Harman told TV Week's Miller that she was shocked that her character would be interested in another River Boy, after what happened with Stu. The actress thought Casey was the good one out of the group, so that appealed to Sasha. Harman commented "I think she's had a bit of a bad run with Stu and then with Xavier not pulling his weight for her. But she's very keen on Casey because he's always been there and she hasn't really noticed him until now, so she becomes a bit curious." Harman called the situation "the butterfly period" and explained that when Sasha is around Casey, she gets butterflies and then she wants more butterflies. Sasha and Casey become closer when she helps him with his feelings towards his incarcerated father, Danny (Andy McPhee). Sasha supports and encourages Casey, proving to be a loyal friend. Through this she slowly falls in love with him. Harman added that things between Sasha and Casey would not be smooth, saying "I think the upcoming stuff is all about Danny and Casey's issues, and he doesn't always treat Sasha the best way. She gets thrown around a little bit before she sees any good signs of him."

Sasha later loses her virginity to Casey, shortly after he is released from prison. She then believes that she may be pregnant. Harman said that she was shocked when she learned that a pregnancy storyline may be on the way for her character. She commented "I was reading the storyline and I was like, 'Oh my gosh!' I was extremely sad about the pregnancy. It's a terrible thing to happen to a 16-year-old. It would be so shocking. I wouldn't have known what to do [at that age]. I probably still wouldn't know what to do." Sasha "feels unable" to talk to Casey, believing that he does not feel as strongly about her as she does him. Harman explained that the situation is awkward for Sasha because their night together meant more to her, plus Casey is in "a really bad headspace" with his upcoming court case. Sasha decides to confide in Natalie Davison (Catherine Mack), the school counsellor, because she trusts her.

==== Spencer Harrington ====
Following his break up with Maddy Osborne (Kassandra Clementi), Spencer Harrington (Andrew Morley) becomes attracted to Sasha and she feels the same way. It is not long before Dex and Indi notice it too. When Dex realises how much chemistry Sasha and Spencer share, he encourages Spencer to act on his feelings. Indi become aware of the situation when Sasha recommends Spencer for a job at her gym. Harman explained that Sasha's siblings want things to happen for Sasha, especially since she has had her fair share of heartbreak and "bad times with boys". Dex and Indi believe Spencer is eligible and they try everything to make him and Sasha admit their feelings for each other. When Spencer gets the gym job, he celebrates with Sasha and they start to realise that they are becoming something more than friends. However, they are hesitant to act on it, as they do not want to hurt Maddy.

Sasha initially rejects Spencer's advances, but she eventually confesses her feelings for him. Spencer is suspicious at first, but realises that she is being genuine. Morley explained that Sasha does not want to jump in and get hurt like before, but Spencer realises that she is a sweet girl and that they are both unsure. When Sasha goes to walk away from Spencer, he kisses her. Morley quipped "It's a cute little scene, because they're both really honest with each other and go with their instincts." The begin dating, but decide to keep the relationship to themselves at first, as they are worried about breaking the news to Maddy. Both Sasha and Spencer feel guilty and struggle to find the right time to tell her.

=== Friendship with Rosie Prichard ===
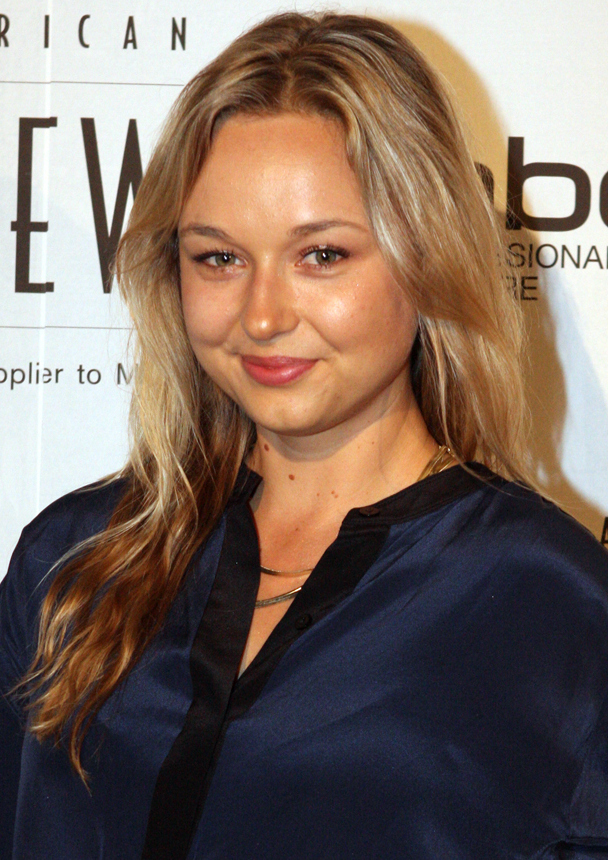
Teri Haddy played Sasha's friend Rosie.

In January 2013, a new friend for Sasha arrived in the form of "sweet, but awkward" Rosie Prichard (Teri Haddy). Haddy revealed that Harman made her feel right at home on set and gave her a bug hug on her first day. Rosie had always lived in Summer Bay, but had never been seen on-screen before. Haddy called Rosie a bit of "a loner" and said that she looks up to Sasha. After Rosie becomes friends with Sasha, she is invited to a party at her house. Haddy explained that when Rosie learns that Sasha used to date Casey, she gets excited because, to her, he is like royalty in the Bay.

Harman explained that Rosie would become "a bit obsessive about Sasha's company" and in trying prove that their friendship is genuine, she runs into the rough surf to get Sasha's attention. Rosie feels Sasha has not been taking enough notice of her. Rosie cannot swim and soon finds herself in trouble. Harman said that there is "huge danger" for the both of them, as the beach is not being patrolled and Sasha is not a confident swimmer. Sasha eventually becomes concerned for Rosie and she is forced to confront her fears and enter the surf to rescue her. However, both girls soon end up in danger when they become stuck in a rip. While filming the scenes, Harman and Haddy got stuck in a rip for real. Harman ended up getting dragged out further than Haddy and she called the experience scary, but felt safe as there were lifesavers on the beach.

When Rosie was raped by fellow student Alexander Mullens (Louis McIntosh), she immediately turned to Sasha for help and support. Sasha proves to be "a tower of strength" for Rosie in the aftermath of her ordeal. Both girls are shocked when Mullens turns up at school and brags about being let go by the police. Seeing how much it is hurting Rosie, Sasha lashes out and punches Mullens in the face. Sasha finds herself in trouble and worries that Mullens might report her to the police for assault.

=== Departure ===
On 2 November 2014, it was confirmed that Harman had left Home and Away after three and a half years. She filmed her final scenes on 10 October. Of leaving, Harman commented, "Leading up to finishing was so traumatic, it was so scary. Letting go of something you have known and loved for three-and-a-half years was traumatic." Sasha made her screen departure in mid-2015 and Harman hinted that her exit storyline would contain "tears, tears and more tears".

== Storylines ==
Following her mother's death, Sasha arrives in Summer Bay to live with her long-lost father Sid. He initially appears uncaring as he is forced to work shifts at the hospital. Sasha decides to seek employment with the aim of supporting herself and her half-brother Felix. Leah Patterson-Baker (Ada Nicodemou) offers Sasha a job at the Pier Diner. Felix runs away from his home and finds Sasha. When a storm passes through Summer Bay the pair take refuge in John Palmer's (Shane Withington) house. Sasha finds John has collapsed and she calls Sid, who sends an ambulance. Felix hides in the local school, while Sasha steals money from the Diner till. Roo Stewart (Georgie Parker) convinces Sasha to hand over the money and gives her a second chance. Sid asks Felix's father to let Felix move in with his family, but Felix's father refuses. Sasha begins dating Stu Henderson and Sid voices his disapproval, but later relents when he realises that Sasha will not stop seeing Stu.

Sasha is delighted when Stu tells her he loves her. Stu later becomes angry when she does not reply to his texts. Sasha tries to explain herself, but Stu slaps her. He buys her a ring and apologises to convince her to stay with him. Sasha gets a tattoo for Stu, but he is unimpressed and slaps her in the face. She forgives him, but Stu slaps her again when she talks to another guy. Sasha attempts to give the ring back to Stu who becomes angry and steals Xavier's car. He insists that Sasha accompany him on a drive and successfully begs for another chance. Sasha's tattoo becomes infected and Xavier takes her to the hospital to be treated. Sasha tries to avoid Stu, but he begins to harass her via the telephone. While attending a Year 12 formal, Stu hassles Sasha and hits her once again. This time Sid witnesses the attack and he beats Stu up. Sasha reveals the truth about the abusive relationship and Stu's father, Alan, confronts Sasha about her accusations. Stu is later found dead and the Walker family become suspects. Sasha also becomes the victim of a bullying campaign.

When Sid is named as the prime suspect, Sasha confesses to killing Stu in self-defence and the police are informed. However, they view it as a murder and press charges. She is later found innocent. Sasha has a brief romance with Xavier before turning her advances to Casey. She supports him through his many problems and they become good friends. As she spends more time with him she develops feelings for him and she loses her virginity to him. Sasha then has a pregnancy scare. When Tamara Kingsley (Kelly Paterniti) arrives in the Bay, Sasha finds herself competing for Casey's affections. He chooses Tamara, which leaves Sasha upset. Sasha befriends Rosie Prichard, but she soon becomes possessive. Rosie tries to gain Sasha's attention by running into the surf. While trying to help Rosie, Sasha nearly drowns in the process. Sasha then asks for space and Rosie refuses to speak to her. This hurts Sasha and she tries to make amends when Rosie befriends Mullens. Sasha and Spencer Harrington support Rosie when she is raped and the two grow close. They initially refuse to acknowledge their feelings, but soon begin dating. They try to keep the relationship a secret from Spencer's ex-girlfriend, Maddy, but she finds out and becomes jealous.

Spencer's older brother, Chris (Johnny Ruffo), arrives in the Bay and Sasha does not get along with him, after he throws her in the sea. They eventually become friends when Spencer attacks Chris and she learns Spencer has bipolar disorder. Spencer joins a cult and when he cannot be persuaded to come home, Sasha asks Evelyn MacGuire (Philippa Northeast) to look out for him. She later becomes jealous of their closeness. Mangrove River High School is burnt down and some of the students are sent to Summer Bay High. Sasha does not get along with Matt Page (Alec Snow). After Dexter marries April Scott (Rhiannon Fish) and leaves for Paris, Sid tells Sasha that she must move to Broken Hill with him. However, wanting to stay in the Bay, Sasha moves in with Irene Roberts (Lynne McGranger). Sasha, Irene, Chris and Spencer are held hostage by Sean Green (Khan Chittenden). He threatens Sasha and attempts to take her with him, but Chris saves her by tackling Sean.

Sasha and Tamara compete for the school captain position. Matt also becomes involved and he and Tamara win. Sasha helps Matt with his speech and he kisses her. She rejects him as she is dating Spencer, but he later breaks up with her. Sasha grows closer to Matt when she learns that he is struggling to take care of his younger sister, Eloise (Darcey Wilson). Sasha convinces Matt to let Eloise go into care. Matt kisses Sasha again, but she rejects his advances. She finds him a place to live with Leah. Matt and Sasha later begin dating. Sasha writes an article about Oscar MacGuire (Jake Speer) hitting Tamara with a car. Evelyn blames Sasha when Oscar is arrested by the police and Matt comes to her defence, but embarrasses Sasha in the process. Matt apologises by Matt stripping off in public to embarrass himself. Sasha replaces Tamara as school captain. Matt and Sasha organise the year 12 formal and they consummate their relationship. Sasha learns Casey has died and she explains to Matt that she never forgave Casey for hurting her.

Sasha tells Matt that she does not want him to end up like Casey and Matt comforts her. Sasha and Matt's relationship is strained when Matt's father, Gray (Craig Ball), arrives. He attacks Matt for letting Eloise go and threatens Sasha. Things become worse when Sasha thinks Matt cheated on her with Evelyn. Sasha learns that Matt is performing at Phoebe Nicholson's (Isabella Giovinazzo) music launch in the city and she joins other Summer Bay residents on a bus to the launch. The bus crashes, but Sasha only suffers minor injuries. She tries to save the bus driver, but he dies in her arms. Sasha gets into her preferred university and arranges to commute back to the Bay to see Matt every week, when he is forced to return to school. She spends her last night with Matt before leaving for university. Sasha returns early to surprise Matt and they spend the night in the diner. After missing her bus, Matt drives Sasha back to the city. Sasha returns after failing her first assignment. After realising that their relationship won't work long-term, she and Matt break-up and Sasha leaves for good.

== Reception ==
For her portrayal of Sasha, Harman was nominated in the Most Popular New Female Talent category at the 2012 Logie Awards. Susan Hill from the Daily Star called Sasha a "wayward teen". A Daily Record reporter thought Sasha and Xavier were a "photogenic couple". Carena Crawford from All About Soap questioned whether a girl of Sasha's size could kill Stu and whether she was being truthful over the events.
