= Xavier Austin =

- Home and Away character
- Portrayed by: David Jones-Roberts
- Duration: 2008–2013
- First appearance: 20 November 2008
- Last appearance: 24 April 2013
- Introduced by: Cameron Welsh
In-universe information
- Occupation: Student (2008–2011); Pizza delivery boy (2011–2012); Police Officer (2012–)
- Father: Jeremy Austin
- Mother: Gina Austin
- Stepfather: John Palmer
- Brothers: Hugo Austin; Brendan Austin
- Uncles: Tony Holden
- First cousins: Jack Holden; Lucas Holden; Harry Holden

Xavier Austin is a fictional character from the Australian Channel Seven soap opera Home and Away, played by David Jones-Roberts. The character debuted on-screen during the episode airing on 20 November 2008. Jones-Roberts was cast in the role after previously auditioning for the roles of four other characters. Xavier has been portrayed as a caring character who has had to look after his family. Many of his storylines have been centred on his relationship with Ruby Buckton. Xavier departed on 3 July 2012, but made a brief return from 23 to 24 April 2013, for the funeral of his mother, Gina.

== Casting ==
Auditions were held and actor Jones-Roberts was cast in the role. Jones-Roberts had previously auditioned for the roles of Henry Hunter, Lucas Holden, Drew Curtis and Geoff Campbell and stated that receiving the role of Xavier was "all the more awesome" because he had to wait for such a long time. Whilst surfing his agent told him he had the role over a pay-phone and Jones-Roberts adds: "I got all excited and started jumping around. I ran up to a couple of people I saw that I knew and just started screaming."

== Development ==
=== Characterisation ===
The serial's official website describe Xavier stating: "Xavier's not your typical teen – he’s had it tougher than most. In fact, he hasn’t really been allowed a proper childhood." Xavier has had to care for his family a lot of the time, of this they state: "The responsibility of 'man of the house' fell on Xavier’s shoulders and he has dutifully played that role ever since. He has a deep love and incredible patience with Brendan (Kain O'Keeffe) who is twenty, but with a mental capacity of a four year old." Xavier was seen yearning for a care-free life and started taking recreational drugs and partying, but they add that later he "matured into a caring and thoughtful young man." Jones-Roberts describes Xavier adding: "When we first met Xavier we think he is a bit of a ratbag, but when we get to know him and his family we discover his mucking about has been his release and escape from his family responsibilities." Xavier chooses to join the police force after he leaves school. He feels that joining the force will allow him the opportunity to help other people, something that he has always done himself.

=== Relationships ===
Xavier starts a romance with Ruby Buckton (Rebecca Breeds), but Ruby is seen having to impress him after Xavier initially shows her little interest. Speaking of Xavier's attitude Breeds states: "He's a challenge, she had to work for him and there is something mysterious and naughty about him but deep down she knows he is loyal and decent." He later starts dating April Scott (Rhiannon Fish), of Fish this states: "I know April would like there to be a little romance between her and Xavier. However, there are a few obstacles she encounters along the way so it's really a question of whether he's going to man up..."

In January 2012, a writer for TV Week observed that with sparks already flying between Xavier and Sasha Bezmel (Demi Harman), it looked like they would become Home and Away's newest couple over the coming months. When an upset Sasha is taunted by some Summer Bay High students in the Diner, Xavier sticks up for her because he feels it is the right thing to do. "They then create a friendship, but their romance takes a while to develop as Sasha is quite strong-willed." Jones-Roberts stated "When she arrived in the Bay, they were clashing heads nonstop. But Xavier likes that about the girls he's been with – they've all been really fiery and he always finds it a good challenge to try and match them."

=== Departure ===
During the episode broadcast on 3 July 2012, Xavier was seen leaving Summer Bay to live in Goulburn permanently. It was then confirmed that Jones-Roberts had left the cast of Home and Away. The actor thanked fans for their support, writing "Just wanted to say thanks to all my fans out there for your continued support throughout the years. Truly wouldn't be where I am without you guys."

Following Sonia Todd's departure from Home and Away in 2013, Jones-Roberts returned to film funeral scenes for her character and Xavier's mother, Gina.

== Storylines ==
Xavier arrives in Summer Bay at a party. He takes drugs and meets Ruby. Ruby likes Xavier and starts pursuing him. After a few dates with Ruby, her sister Charlie (Esther Anderson) finds drugs in his coat. His cousin Jack Holden (Paul O'Brien) decides to send him home. Xavier returns for Jack's funeral, along with his mother Gina (Sonia Todd) and brother Hugo (Bernard Curry). Xavier and Hugo do not get on and he reveals his resentment for him because he left the family to cope with their troubles and Brendan's condition alone. Ruby was delighted by his return and tried to pick up where they left off. He rejects her and reveals he has a girlfriend Freya Duric (Sophie Hensser). He eventually dumps Freya for Ruby, but she turns up and wins him back and then forces him to sell drugs at the school. Freya kisses Hugo in view of Xavier and plants drugs on Xavier. Ruby tries to rid of them but Charlie catches her. Belle Taylor (Jessica Tovey) then exposes Freya as the supplier. Ruby then borrows money from Roman Harris (Conrad Coleby), she then gives it to Freya to leave for good, which she does. This upsets Xavier and he realises that he should be with Ruby after all. Jai Fernandez (Jordan Rodrigues) helps the pair reconcile their relationship.

Brendan comes to stay after Gina breaks her ankle. Xavier initially hides Brendan from his friends, but they soon realise he needs help with looking after him. Hugo makes it clear he doesn't want to look after him and palms him off on Xavier. Martha MacKenzie (Jodi Gordon) offers to look after him, whilst in her care he runs off and hides. Xavier finds him but a startled Brendan catapults a rock through a passing blue car window. In the car is Leah Patterson-Baker (Ada Nicodemou) and Roman, the rock hits Roman in the head and Leah crashes the car. Xavier tries to protect Brendan but Gina hands him in to the police but Roman refuses to press charges. His feud with Hugo escalates until Hugo is attacked by a shark; he tries to make things better.

Xavier accidentally injures Jai with a gun at the farm. Ruby loses her virginity to Xavier only to be caught by their family. Ruby's father Ross (David Downer) is furious and take Ruby away to stay with him. When she returns she avoids Xavier and spends more time with Geoff (Lincoln Lewis). He becomes convinced they are seeing each other. Ruby goes through some more hard times and Nicole Franklin (Tessa James) convinces her to end things with Xavier. Ruby dumps him, and he accuses her of only doing it because of Geoff. Hugo gets into a fight, he tries to help but is knocked unconscious. When he comes around he cannot remember Ruby dumping him so she plays along. He gives her a false alibi for the night her real father Grant Bledcoe (Clayton Watson) was murdered. He later remembers Ruby dumping him and is annoyed when she starts dating Geoff. He starts dating both Ali and Rosie until they find out about each other and fight.

Xavier becomes annoyed at Gina for dating John Palmer (Shane Withington) and emotionally blackmails her to keep her distance from him. Xavier realises Hugo has been involved in the refugee scandal and Hugo is killed. He later finds out that Hugo is really still alive and finds money from him. He tries to donate it to the refugees but Gina ruins his plans. He tries to give it to Charlie to no avail and he tells Mink Carpenter (Matylda Buczko) about the money. She steals it and later has a change of heart giving it him back and kissing him. She tells Ruby about their kiss, annoying Xavier who had hoped for a chance to reconcile with Ruby. Xavier tries to ruin Gina and John's relationship after they got back together. Xavier, Gina and Martha are kidnapped and trapped in a vat filling with water, Xavier manages to save everyone. He was further annoyed when he noticed Ruby was falling for Liam Murphy (Axle Whitehead). Xavier eventually learns to accept his mother's relationship with John.

When April decides to take her environmental protesting to extremist levels, April steals chemicals from the school. Xavier convinces April to dispose of the chemicals. However, they react with one another and cause harm to April and Xavier. April later ends their relationship and they agree to remain friends. April grows close to Dexter Walker (Charles Cottier) while she battles OCD. Xavier later gets back together with April, but she starts an affair with Dexter. Xavier sees the pair kissing and refuses to talk to them. Xavier asks Gina if Kelly O'Mara (Martika Sullivan) can move in. They later start a romance which is complicated when her brother Dean (Rick Donald) is revealed to be Bianca Scott's (Lisa Gormley) rapist. Kelly decides to go back to her home in remote farmland. Xavier goes to staty with her, but he finds working on the farm hard and clashes with Kelly's mother Rhonda (May Lloyd). They then amicably decide to end their relationship as Xavier returns to Summer Bay. Xavier decides he wants to go travelling and take a gap year. Gina does not approve, but John talks her around. Xavier changes his mind about travelling and reveals his intention to sign up to the police force. Xavier grows concerned for Sasha Bezmel after he learns her boyfriend Stu Henderson (Brenton Thwaites) has been hitting her.

Xavier defends Sasha when she is hassled by some students in the Diner, and he develops feelings for her. He tries to kiss her, but she tells him that he would be better off keeping away from her. However, he continues supporting her and they eventually begin dating. Gina and John go through a rough patch in their marriage and Xavier unsuccessfully tries to convince John to resolve the problems. The next time he returns from the police academy, Xavier and Sasha cook for John and Gina to help mend the rift between them. When Xavier helps Sasha win her court case, they go to the beach and declare their love for one another. However, they later break up and Xavier tells Sasha that she needs to deal with what happened with Stu. Xavier becomes suspicious of Jett James (Will McDonald) when Colleen Smart's (Lyn Collingwood) caravan is broken into and her money is stolen. He tells Senior Sergeant Mike Emerson (Cameron Stewart) and tries to get a confession out of Jett. Xavier also suspects Jett of mugging Marilyn Chambers (Emily Symons) and tries to question him. Both Xavier and John disapprove of Gina's plan to look after Jett when his mother dies. When Xavier learns Jett attacked his mother, he becomes angry and tells Gina to let him go. Gina refuses and when Jett apologises, Xavier thinks that maybe Jett can be helped.

Xavier returns from the academy to begin work-experience at the police station. He and Emerson break up a fight involving Jett, and Xavier finds a photo of an older man that fell out of Jett's bag. Xavier illegally looks the man up on the COP database and learns he is Richard Bozic (Jadek Ronak). Jett tells Xavier that he thinks Richard may be his father and Gina asks him to find out more. Xavier is caught using the COP database by Emerson and he believes he might be kicked out of the academy. However, Emerson decides not to report him. Xavier tells Gina and John that he is going to move to Goulburn permanently, to attend the academy, and he leaves Summer Bay. The following year, Xavier returns to the Bay to attend his mother's funeral and leaves the following day after asking Casey Braxton (Lincoln Younes) to look out for Jett in his absence, to which Casey agrees.

== Reception ==
Soap opera reporting website Holy Soap recall Xavier's most memorable moment as being: "Watching in horror as Brendan caused a horrific car accident with his catapult." Michael Idato of The Sydney Morning Herald said as that Xavier's one of storylines was a "little rickety" because Jones-Roberts' delivery of his lines, adding he had the "tilt of the head and pout of the lip that we remember so well from a certain Fast Forward sketch." A columnist for the Daily Record opined that the character was "at a loose end" following his separation from Ruby.
