= Ruby Buckton =

Fictional character in Home and Away

- Home and Away character
- Portrayed by: Rebecca Breeds
- Duration: 2008–2012
- First appearance: 20 June 2008
- Last appearance: 15 August 2012
- Introduced by: Cameron Welsh
In-universe information
- Occupation: Student at Summer Bay High (2008–2011)
- Father: Grant Bledcoe
- Mother: Charlie Buckton
- Half-sisters: Mila Bledcoe
- Grandfathers: Ross Buckton
- Grandmothers: Elsie Buckton
- Other relatives: Michelle

Ruby Buckton is a fictional character from the Australian Channel Seven soap opera Home and Away, played by Rebecca Breeds. She debuted on-screen during the episode airing on 20 June 2008. Ruby was created by executive producer Cameron Welsh. When she was first introduced she appeared to hide her problems and pretends to be strong. She was characterised as a free spirited and independent girl. Her storylines have consistently followed themes such as romance, unrequited love and rejection. In what has been described as a "shock storyline" Ruby discovered her sister Charlie Buckton was in fact her mother. This had subsequent effects in her character development. She became out of place and confused about her life. It destroyed her trust in Charlie and their relationship never recovered. Ruby went on a journey of self-discovery and used men to redefine herself. Her relationship with Xavier Austin was characterised through their mutual friendship, which ended through lack of passion. She controversially fell in love with her music teacher Liam Murphy, the pair shared an emotional and creative connection through music. Yet, her advances were unrequited and it created problems with her state of mind and began binge drinking. Breeds felt the storyline differed to her romance with Xavier, as it showed Ruby "headstrong and unconfined". Breeds felt they were ill-suited to one another.

Ruby later develops feelings for Romeo Smith and attempts to ruin his relationship with Indigo Walker. Off-screen Breeds got into a relationship with Luke Mitchell who plays Romeo, and the pair had previously stated they did not want their characters to get together in case it created problems for them in real life. Ruby and Romeo sleep together and after she is rejected, Ruby becomes wayward, self-harms and sleeps with Casey Braxton on the rebound. The storyline also created more tension with Charlie who found it difficult to offer Ruby any parental advice. In other minor storylines, Ruby has come to terms with having diabetes and discovered a talent for singing. Breeds is a classically trained singer and she had to change her voice to suit Ruby's amateur vocals. Ruby has received critical analysis through her storylines. Some have branded her a "boyfriend-stealer", "self-absorbed" and a "randy school girl". Her storylines with Liam were partially favoured to others. Breeds has been nominated for the "Most Popular New Female Talent" and "Most Popular Actress" Logie Awards for her portrayal of Ruby.

== Development ==
=== Characterisation ===
On the outside Ruby gives the appearance of being bright and free-spirited, but she's not without her problems: she hit Summer Bay still grieving her mother's death, and went on to witness the decline of her late father, discover that 'sister' Charlie is actually her mother and, after one romantic knockback too many, develop a drinking problem.

— Channel 5 on Ruby.

The serial's official website describes Ruby as being carefree, though she puts on a front to hide her emotions. Ruby arrives grieving for the loss of her mother; unlike her sister, Ruby takes an "internal approach and bottled it up inside", creating a facade and appearing to be strong. They also brand her as independent and she does not care what others think about her and is inclined to keep to herself. Speaking of her aspirations in life, they add: "Her goal in life is simply to be happy and to be content in enjoying life’s simpler things and the people in it."

Describing her character, portraying actress Rebecca Breeds stated: "Ruby has gone through a lot and had to gain a level of independence I really admire. She is free-spirited and sure of whom she is. I love playing Ruby; she is cheeky and easy-going, but very passionate about her family." Breeds also described Ruby's hatred to being underestimated: "When people think something is beyond her, or she's too young, she gets twice as determined."

Ruby is often "prepared to be confrontational and abrasive". She is often not careful in situations and is unaware of the consequences and what is coming up in the future. Breeds said she is "idealistic and has high expectations" of herself and is a "very passionate" person, but is flawed by her "outspoken and brash" nature. Breeds said that she can sympathise that she is irrational and silly because she is young.

=== Relationships ===
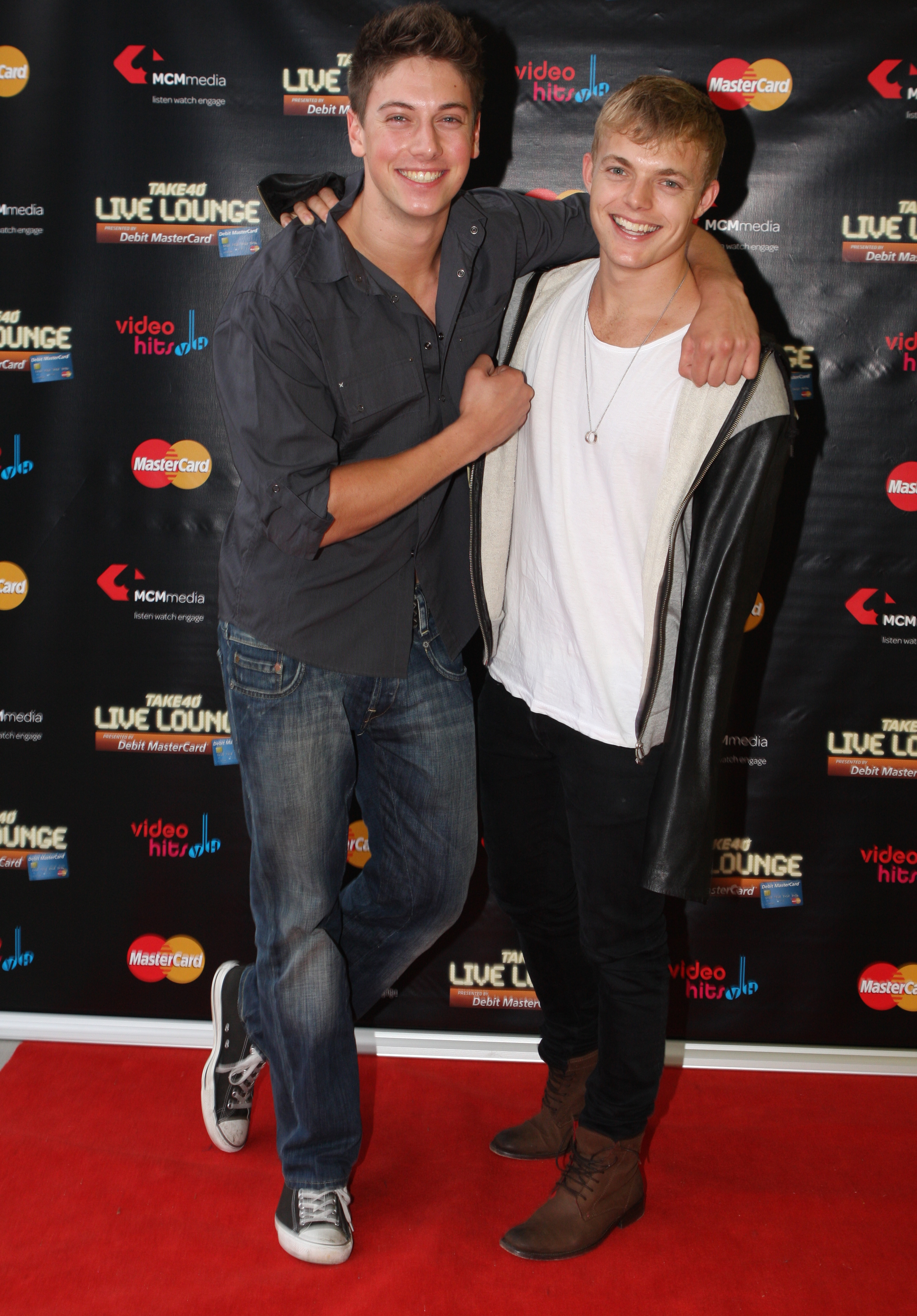
Lincoln Younes and David Jones-Roberts (pictured) play Casey Braxton and Xavier Austin, two of Ruby's love interests.

Ruby has a relationship with Xavier Austin (David Jones-Roberts), who initially messes her around. Ruby decides to try and win Xavier back even after her initial heartbreak, of this Breeds states: "She pushes boundaries where I wouldn't and she has a lot of fun. She thinks she is so mature, but she's really young and innocent." Breeds explains her attraction to Xavier as "a challenge - she had to work for him and there is something mysterious and naughty about him but deep down she knows he is loyal and decent." Their relationship ultimately ends after they grow apart. Breeds said that Ruby and Xavier's relationship was a more "beautiful friendship and really good support" dynamic, rather than a romantic scenario. She also said it was "lacking passion, which everyone deserves. It's there but it's not there enough."

Ruby later starts to have feelings for Romeo Smith (Luke Mitchell). Of the storyline Breeds states: "It's going to be the easiest thing I've ever had to do. There's no acting involved at all. But he's got a girlfriend so Ruby has to find a way to justify going after someone who has a girlfriend. So that's kind of hard. But he's the hero. She believes he's the love of her life. I guess with that in mind you wouldn't let anything get in the way of that. Who knows, he might be." However Breeds previously revealed she did not want the pair to romance each other, due to her real life relationship with Mitchell. Mitchell himself had also revealed he did not want the pair to start a romance. In comparison to her willingness to take him from Indigo, Breeds said Ruby would not have done the same whilst Romeo was with her best friend Annie Campbell (Charlotte Best).

Mitchell revealed that Romeo's relationship with Indigo Walker (Samara Weaving) would drift apart in the event of the "love triangle" storyline. Executive producer Cameron Welsh promised viewers that the storyline would play a big part of the serial in 2011. He also stated: "Fans will definitely take sides on this one. Luke Mitchell, Rebecca Breeds and Samara Weaving are having a great time with this storyline, and we'll see a new side to all of them as they face the consequences of their actions." Breeds later explained Ruby's reasoning and the hidden issue which makes her believe she loves him so quickly stating: "Ruby has a lot of insecurity because Ruby never really had a father figure. There's a lot of looking to belong and looking for love because she's had a displaced family life, and she feels like Romeo is her family. Romeo has some issues of his own. He is struggling with his relationship with Indi. The pair find themselves in a similar place of understanding." After Romeo sleeps with Ruby, Mitchell said Romeo immediately regrets it. Ruby then decides to reveals the truth to Indigo. This ruins their friendship and Weaving said: "I think that friendship is pretty much over now!".

Ruby has a brief fling with Casey Braxton (Lincoln Younes) after her romance with Romeo ends. When Ruby realises that Romeo is back with his girlfriend, she sleeps with Casey. He then takes "great pleasure" in revealing the details about Ruby's relationship with Romeo.

=== Maternal issues ===
In another storyline her sister Charlie Buckton (Esther Anderson) reveals she is in fact her mother. The reveal episode centered around Ruby interrogating Charlie about the identity of her secret child, with Charlie breaking down whilst she admits the truth. Whilst filming the episodic block, both Breeds and Anderson found the storyline challenging; furthermore they felt a responsibility to get the narrative flow and emotions perfect. Breeds said she had to let it affect her own emotions in order to affect the viewing public. Although she was nervous, Breeds was pleased with the end result.

The revelation ruins their relationship. The actresses shared insight: "Ruby just wants to get some security back, everything she thought her life was is totally up in the air"; whilst Charlie was "trying desperately to bridge this gap" The events impact Ruby's self-identity, leaving her feeling confused and her backstory succumb the distortion Charlie causes. Ruby starts to ask herself questions such as "Where do I stand now with everything?" and "How do I reconcile this?". Breeds said it was a "big exploration" and "a journey" for Ruby, with Anderson agreeing. Anderson felt there was a beautiful element to the storyline and opined "Although it is tragic, you feel sorry for Charlie and you can sort of understand where it has all come from." She said that ultimately everyone feels sorry for Ruby, meaning neither are wrong. Furthermore, she said "You are just rooting for them, you just want them to get back to how they were and it is a bit of a journey."

Charlie later struggles to deal with Ruby's relationship with Casey. Discussing Charlie's motives, Anderson stated: "Ruby's at that age where she is quite impressionable, and Charlie doesn't want to see her getting hurt. She's only very recently been in a relationship with Romeo, and Charlie is concerned about her moving from one guy to the next too quickly." Casey's brother Darryl Braxton (Steve Peacocke) tries to advise Ruby through her troubles. Although she was not prepared to listen, Darryl gave her a new understanding, a development that is said to "surprise" Ruby. Questioned about Ruby's situation Anderson opined: "He offers the first bit of good advice that she's heard in relation to parenting so, as much as she doesn't want to admit it, he does get through."

=== School girl crushes ===
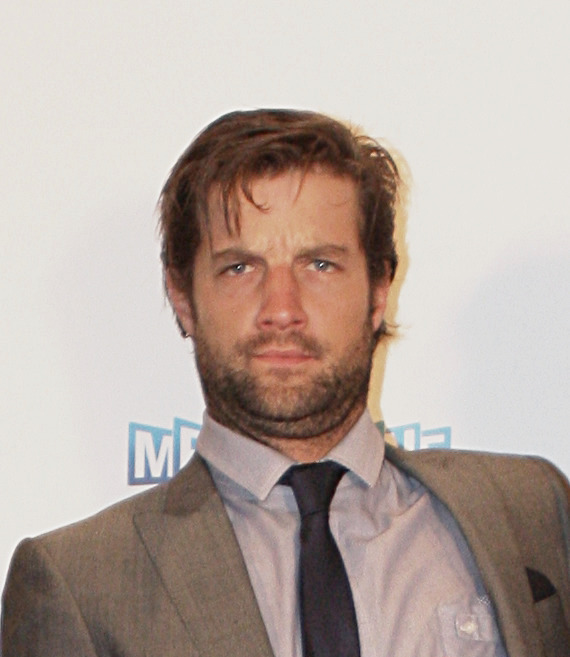
Axle Whitehead (pictured) plays Liam, the object of Ruby's forbidden feelings.

Ruby has fallen in love with two of her teachers during her tenure. The first being Miles Copeland (Josh Quong Tart). Breeds said it was a "genuine teenage infatuation" and Ruby was "drawn to his maturity" rather than his physical appearance. Quong Tart said Miles was "taken back" by the kiss him and the subsequent investigation he faces from the school board.

Ruby later becomes good friends with her music teacher Liam Murphy (Axle Whitehead). They work closely together and Ruby develops feelings for him. The storyline creates many hurdles for the characters and highlights "controversial negotiation" in its themes. This sees Ruby experience a "different kind of love" than she felt for Xavier. At this point Breeds said: "She's matured a bit and is exploring different parts of herself and love." Through Liam she was "realising something she's passionate about, and being encouraged in her creativity with her music." It is the intoxication of the situation that has been misappropriated to Liam. Breeds opined they shared "really strong chemistry emotionally and creatively." She said Ruby is ignorant to the fact he is her teacher by virtue of the fact she is feeling "headstrong and doesn't confine herself to boxes." Ruby was initially in denial of her feelings, she realised it was "controversial" – Yet, ultimately she decided to be true to her feelings.

Breeds acknowledged that from a musical stand point someone who inspires you creatively and acts as your muse, is a special bond. She attributed it to Liam's feelings for Ruby. Ruby and Liam continue to act a support unit for one another. As the scholarship develops they talk to each other about "mature things that surpass a student-teacher relationship." Liam later develops feelings for Bianca Scott (Lisa Gormley) and Ruby is seeing Liam slip from her grasp. Breeds said "She sees them flirting and she has a moment where she realises that she's so in love with this guy and it's kind of now or never. She needs to take action." True to Ruby's persona she does not preconceive her actions and Ruby feels she has to "set the record straight and to give it a really good crack." For Ruby it is a spontaneous, impromptu moment; "She's just totally spilling out with feelings for him."

"When she crosses the line, he knows they can't go back and she knows that and I think that's why she's so devastated. She hasn't been working under the parameters of teacher/student. She sees him as one of her best friends and someone who has brought her into who she is and introduced her into this whole new world. She doesn't see teacher. She doesn't see age. She just sees him. Him to her, he sees all the circumstances and the complications."

— Breeds discussing the impact Liam has on Ruby's life.(2011)

However Liam is forced to maintain his responsibility. Breeds attributes this to the fact he has a "professional career to think about it. He's not a teenager, so he's in a different place. I think it's very confusing for him. Liam issued a firm warning that he would terminate their professional relationship if her feelings became uncontrollable." Breeds subsequently stated she did not think Liam was right for Ruby. She said the ideal scenario for the pair would be "in a different lifetime and if they were closer in age. It would have been beautiful if there weren't logistics standing in the way." Ruby then cannot handle rejection and turns to alcohol for comfort and to "numb her feelings".

Aside from the romantic theme in her storyline Ruby has been shown as an aspiring singer. Breeds is classically trained in real life and said she doesn't mind singing on camera. Discussing this she stated: "When you're playing a character you can hide behind them. I know it's still my voice, [...] I was more confident singing from Ruby's point of view. Even though there was a storyline where she was terrified about singing in a school play, I wasn't nervous at all. I had to try really hard to make myself feel nervous." She revealed she had to play down her voice and make it "a bit cleaner" and a "bit more inexperienced". This was due to the fact it was meant to be that she had never sung before – "I have to pull her back a bit." She added the storyline was realistic because there are no set guidelines for discovering vocal talent.

=== Departure ===
In June 2012, TV Week's Miller reported that Breeds had filmed her final scenes and left Home and Away. Breeds told Miller that she could not discuss her departure because of her contract with the series. She added that "Ruby is still very much alive, I'm not free of Ruby just yet". Two months later, the Daily Star's Susan Hill announced that Ruby decides to leave Summer Bay after she makes "an emotional visit" to her mother's grave. She then realises that she needs to move on from recent events and the only way she can do that is to leave the Bay. A spokesperson told Hill "Ruby knows that to save her life she must leave for a fresh start. It's going to be emotional as she has so many good memories but the bad ones are all she can think of." However, Ruby leaves Summer Bay after she confesses to tampering with the brakes of a car, which resulted in Dexter Walker (Charles Cottier) being seriously injured. Ruby regrets what she has done and hands herself in to the police after saying goodbye to Darryl Braxton (Steve Peacocke). Breeds thanked her fans on Twitter, saying "Thank you. Such beautiful feedback. So sad that it's all over, but kind of relieved to let poor Ruby go and heal... And my Eyes.. Love you."

== Storylines ==
Ruby arrives in Summer Bay following the death of her grandmother Elsie Buckton. She and her boyfriend Pat Jenkins (Lachlan Jeffrey) spend a few weeks together until she realises it is not going to work out, he leaves her. Her friends Jai Fernandez (Jordan Rodrigues) and Annie, who are in a relationship, make her feel lonely so she convinces herself she loves Miles. When her father Ross Buckton is diagnosed with Alzheimer's, she finds it hard to cope. She contacts - via the internet - classmate Matthew Lyons (Ross Pirelli), a wayward teenager, and reveals he is experiencing the same with his grandmother. When she finds out it is Matthew, she thinks he has lied and photographs him undressed and displays them. She then realises he was telling the truth and Matthew will not forgive her and decides to exact revenge.

She later takes a romantic interest in Xavier and they have a brief fling until he has to leave because of drug couriering. He later returns and she opts to resume their relationship, but his ex-girlfriend Freya Duric (Sophie Hensser) ruins things. She makes him sell illegal drugs again and Xavier is torn between her and Ruby. He later decides to settle down with Ruby much to her delight after Ruby exposes Freya and pays her to leave. When Xavier's brother Brendan (Kain O'Keeffe) arrives, he pushes Ruby away because he has learning difficulties, he feels they will act strangely. Ruby later bonds with Brendan; Xavier is pleased and they resume their relationship.

Ruby initially finds it hard to cope with her sister Charlie's relationship with Joey Collins (Kate Bell), but grows to accept it. Ruby decides to sleep with Xavier, they are caught by Ross who sends Ruby away for a while. Ruby learns Charlie had a secret child when she was young, she tries to track her down and is shocked when her Aunt Michelle (Michelle Pettigrove) tells her that Charlie knows who it is. Charlie reveals the truth, that Ruby is actually her daughter and that she became pregnant when Grant Bledcoe raped her. Charlie's parents agreed to bring Ruby up as their own. Ruby tracks Grant down and accuses him of ruining everyone's lives. Grant tells Ruby she has convinced herself it was not consented, Charlie then kidnaps Grant to get the truth. Grant later turns up dead on the beach and Charlie and Ruby are in the frame for his murder, until Ross later admits he did it.

Ruby starts to have feelings for Geoff Campbell (Lincoln Lewis), Xavier is jealous and they drift apart. She tries to dump him but he is knocked unconscious and forgets what she told him. After a while he remembers and their relationship ends. While seeing Geoff, Ruby starts to feel unwell and is diagnosed with diabetes. She later organises a rally to stop a number of refugees being deported, but the event is fire bombed by racists. After this event Geoff blames Ruby and leaves her and Summer Bay. She briefly reunites with Xavier but Mink Carpenter (Matylda Buczko) ruins it. Ruby later enlists Liam to become her music tutor. They form a strong friendship but Ruby starts to have feeling for him. Nicole Franklin (Tessa James) tells Liam, he agrees to keep tutoring her and tells her where they stand. Although Liam tells her they will not be together, she lets her feelings develop into love for Liam and tries to kiss him. He tells her again that it is wrong and decides to put some space between them. Ruby kisses Casey, but she later reveals she really wants to be with Romeo. She has sex with Romeo, but is devastated when he rejects her. She tells Charlie that she wants to hurt Romeo like he hurt her and tells Indigo about their one-night stand. Ruby then begins a relationship with Casey. She is devastated when Charlie dies, after being shot. Ruby blames Darryl Braxton (Steve Peacocke) for her mother's death and she pushes Casey away and their relationship ends.

Ruby begins entering surf competitions with Romeo and when his marriage breaks down, he tells her that he has feelings for her. They begin dating later move in together. Ruby suspects Romeo is going to break up with her and she tells him she is pregnant. Leah Patterson-Baker (Ada Nicodemou) learns Ruby is lying and urges her to tell Romeo the truth. Ruby does and Romeo leaves her. Ruby later notices Romeo trying to get back with Indi and she decides to tamper with the brakes on Indi's car in order to get rid of her. However, Indi's brother, Dexter (Charles Cottier), drives the car and crashes, leaving him with serious injuries. Ruby feels guilty for what she has done and decides to hand herself into the police.

== Reception ==
Breeds received a Logie Award nomination for "Most Popular New Female Talent" at the 51st Logie Awards for her portrayal of Ruby. She was later nominated for the "Most Popular Actress" Logie in 2010, with Breeds stating: "To know that people like Ruby makes me think I'm doing a good job." At the 2012 Inside Soap Awards, Breeds was nominated for "Best Daytime Star". Holy Soap recall Ruby's most memorable moment as being: "Trying to cope with her Dad's illness, Ruby started talking to someone on Skype, only to find out it was Matthew playing a trick. She got revenge by convincing him to go skinny-dipping and nicking his clothes." Carolyn Stewart writing for TV Week felt it was unrealistic for Ruby and Nicole to be best friends after she has "actively pursued two of Nicole's ex-boyfriends." She criticised Bianca's role in Ruby and Liam's storyline, quipping "Bianca-The-Butt-In-Ski" offered "her two cents worth" – subsequently calling her efforts unhelpful to Ruby. She also discussed Ruby's sudden descent into drink and wearing make up; "Obviously heavy make-up is a clue that a character is about to go off the rails… and, boy did she!" She said the moral of the storyline was to never fall in love with a teacher and that the situation had resulted in her as the "drowned-rat Ruby with eye-liner pouring down her face". Stewart later said "The way Ruby stares at Liam... oh, I'm just so embarrassed for the poor little petal! Hilarious!" She also criticised Nicole's bad advice. She later praised the storyline stating it was getting "juicy". Catrin Griffiths writing for the Daily Express said the serial came back in style after its summer break in the UK, owing to storylines such as Ruby's binge drinking.

The Daily Record also said ever since the Buckton family arrived they "created drama", noting it was Ruby and Charlie especially. All About Soap questioned whether "poor Ruby" would ever find a "good bloke" to pair up with. They also said it should not have been to hard for Ruby with all the "surfer types". Holy Soap later said "If there's one thing that Ruby seems to have inherited from Charlie, it's her sometimes questionable taste in men." When Ruby impressed everyone with her singing voice, the Daily Record said "there is actually a rather pleasant storyline involving Ruby". They described the week Ruby slept with Romeo as an eventful one for her and opined she was on "cloud nine". Debbie Schipp writing for Adelaide's Sunday Mail brands Ruby "a low-down boyfriend-stealer" for her affair with Romeo. TV Week said the "impulsive teen" waited until Romeo dropped his guard and "moved in for the kill", but had her "head in the clouds". They correctly predicted it would end "messy". They also showed Ruby little sympathy when she told Indigo about her affair and lost her friends. They said: "The salient lesson here is: don't cop off with your best mate's boyfriend, so you're just gonna have to ride this one out, Rubes." Peter Dyke writing for the Daily Star said Ruby is a "randy schoolgirl" and said that her romance with Casey was merely a "passionate rebound romp". Whilst Erin Miller of TV Week said: "Phew, it's hard to keep up with Ruby's romantic escapades lately!" In April 2011, TV Week said Ruby had become "increasingly trouble-prone" and concluded that "belle in blue Charlie is at her wits' end about what to do with her wayward daughter".
