= Indi Walker =

- Home and Away character
- Portrayed by: Samara Weaving
- Duration: 2009–2013
- First appearance: 30 July 2009
- Last appearance: 13 November 2013
- Introduced by: Cameron Welsh
In-universe information
- Occupation: Student; Waitress; Gym co-owner
- Father: Sid Walker
- Mother: Jody Walker
- Brothers: Dexter Walker
- Half-sisters: Sasha Bezmel
- Husband: Romeo Smith (2011–2013)

Indigo "Indi" Walker is a fictional character from the Australian soap opera Home and Away, played by Samara Weaving. She made her first appearance during the episode broadcast on 30 July 2009. Weaving and her on-screen family initially appeared in 2009 for a guest stint, in 2010 they were written back into the serial on a permanent basis. Indi's storylines have often focused on her relationship with Romeo Smith (Luke Mitchell). Weaving announced her departure from Home and Away in July 2013 and Indi departed on 13 November 2013

== Creation and casting ==
In a June 2009 interview with Digital Spy, series producer Cameron Welsh said a few new cast members would arrive during the coming weeks. The following month, it was announced that the four-strong Walker family would be introduced to Home and Away. The family consists of father Sid (Robert Mammone), mother Jody (Victoria Haralabidou), son Dexter (Tom Green) and daughter Indigo or "Indi". Former Out of the Blue actress Samara Weaving was cast as Indigo. She initially appeared for five weeks in a recurring capacity. The Walker family departed at the conclusion of their storyline.

Weaving reprised the role the following year after producers brought back Indi, Sid and Dexter (now played by Charles Cottier) as part of the main cast. Weaving relocated from Canberra to Sydney for filming. Of her return, Weaving stated "I have loved returning to Home and Away and working with everyone again. It's a fantastic place to work and I look forward to what's next for Indi." Weaving also admitted that her return was "easier" as she did not have to fit in filming around her studies. Weaving later committed herself to a long-term future with the serial stating she wanted to be around for years.

== Development ==
=== Characterisation ===
Indi was initially described as being "in turmoil", because she believes people are all liars and cheats. Indi puts up "barriers" in order to cope. Weaving found this challenging to play, as she came from a stable family. After an accident, Indi is described as re-evaluating her life and has a new-found level of confidence and maturity. Weaving has described Indi as being very forward, not afraid to ask questions and being confident to confront others. The Daily Telegraph describe Indigo as being a "tortured teenager". Richard Clune of The Sunday Telegraph describes her as a typically troubled teen.

=== Relationship with Romeo Smith ===
From her return in 2010, one of Indi's first storylines was her relationship with Romeo Smith (Luke Mitchell). Smith hinted at a romance between the pair before Weaving had appeared on-screen again. Whilst interviewed by TV Week Smith stated: "Initially, Indi goes out of her way to see that he's okay - even though she doesn't know him, so he thinks it's nice that she cares about him. They have a lot in common, but he tells her he's not looking for romance." Their relationship as friends slowly develops into more. Of this Weaving stated during an interview with TV Week: "It's quite funny because Indi is yelling at Romeo for reading into their friendship too much, and then he decides to just kiss her as she's half-way through telling him off! It's what she's always wanted ever since she saw him, so it's a kiss that makes her totally forget what she's saying and why she was angry at him in the first place." Weaving then stated the pair would not find love together quickly: "Indigo responds well to the kiss, but there's definitely still some speed bumps pending in them getting together. Indi definitely thinks that this is going to be a relationship, whereas Romeo has his doubts about it."

In late 2010 it was revealed that Indi and Romeo would begin to drift apart, with Mitchell confirming this. Fellow character Ruby Buckton (Rebecca Breeds) falls in love with Romeo, whilst breeds states that Ruby doesn't consider Indigo's feelings because she sees him as her hero. Speaking in early 2011 Weaving stated that Indi was to face relationships drama stating: "Ruby has her eyes on my boyfriend [Romeo], so that's always cause for trouble, I guess." Executive producer Cameron Welsh promised viewers that the storyline would play a big part of the serial in 2011. He also stated: "Fans will definitely take sides on this one. Luke Mitchell, Rebecca Breeds and Samara Weaving are having a great time with this storyline, and we'll see a new side to all of them as they face the consequences of their actions." After Romeo's infidelity he decides that Indigo is whom he wants to be with Ruby tells Indi the truth. Weaving said that at this point Indigo's "knight in shining armour has been shattered" as she thought he was the one person who wouldn't cheat; Indigo cannot "understand the circumstances." She admitted although you would expect them to be over "she just needs time to grieve" as it leaves her "devastated". However Indi cannot forgive Ruby, Weaving said: "I think that friendship is pretty much over now!"

=== Departure ===
Weaving confirmed her departure from Home and Away in July 2013. She had already filmed her final scenes as Indi. The actress commented "Storyline-wise, it was perfect timing. Plus, with Home and Away so well-known overseas, I felt it was time to pursue other directions, and really start a more versatile career." Weaving said filming her final scenes was both sad and exciting. She also added that she would miss the cast and the Walker family.

== Storylines ==
Indi arrives in Summer Bay with her mother, Jody, father, Sid and brother, Dexter from the city as Sid is covering for Rachel Armstrong (Amy Mathews) at the Northern Districts Hospital. Indi meets Jai Fernandez (Jordan Rodrigues) at the Surf club, she also meets Annie (Charlotte Best) and Geoff Campbell (Lincoln Lewis). Indi invites them all to a party at the docks, where she takes an interest in Geoff, but after Nicole Franklin (Tessa James) tells her she is being too flirty she says she is just being friendly. Indi is angry when Sid tracks them down at the party and snaps when he lectures them about honesty. Indi sees Nicole trying to kiss Sid after she revealed that she had feelings for him, however, he pushes Nicole away. After seeing them Indi starts to behave erratically, she tries to persuade Alf Stewart (Ray Meagher) to serve her alcohol, but he refuses. Indi then goes off with a group of teenagers and she begins to spiral out of control and smokes marijuana. After falling asleep. Indi wakes up and loses her footing, causing her to fall through a glass coffee table and badly cutting her face. The group of teenagers drop Indi off at the hospital and run off. Whilst Indi is being treated for her injuries she refuses to see her father. Nicole later visits Indi in hospital and tries to convince her that it was she who pursued Sid, but Indi does not believe her. Indi is told by a surgeon that her injuries should be easy to treat and with that Jody announces that she is taking Indi and Dexter back to the city. Indi then leaves Summer Bay with Dexter and Jody.

Indi and Dexter leave Jody at the airport and return to Sid's home after deciding not to go travelling with her. Indi agrees to return to Summer Bay along with Sid as he returns for a permanent position at the hospital. Indi moves into the Farmhouse along with her family. Indi and Nicole see each other at school, but both end their feud and start afresh. She later meets Romeo and becomes attracted to him but Indi is disappointed when he says he is not interested in romance at the moment. Indi is annoyed when Dexter reveals to Romeo the dreams she has been having about him therefore revealing her feelings for him. She is later angry with Dexter as Romeo begins to avoid her as he is not ready for a relationship, following his split with Annie. Indi becomes disheartened when Sid starts to go back to his philandering ways, but he tells Indi and Dexter that they are the most important people in his life. Indi and Romeo start to realise their feelings for each other after spending time together, but Romeo admits he is hesitant to start a relationship. They eventually kiss and start dating. Indi gets a job at Angelo Rosetta's (Luke Jacobz) restaurant. She sells alcohol to Ruby thinking she is giving it to Charlie Buckton (Esther Anderson) as a present. Charlie sees this and tells Angelo, who sacks Indi. Irene then offers Indi a job at the Pier Diner and she accepts.

Indi begins to feel like she loves Romeo and when Romeo asks her about it, she confesses that she may love him a little bit. He cannot say it back because of his feelings about Annie, so he breaks up with Indi, which leaves her devastated. Romeo realises he made a mistake and gets back with Indi by telling her that he may love her a little bit too. Romeo decides he is ready to lose his virginity to her and they go upstairs, but a few minutes later Indi runs out crying without explaining to Romeo why. He tries to ring her, but she does not answer. She later talks to Sid and Nicole and she tells Romeo that they need to take things slowly. Romeo encourages her to email her mother. Indi steals a letter from Annie to Romeo and he is angry when he finds out. Indi believes that Romeo is still in love with Annie, but Romeo states that she is the only one for him. Indi apologises for her behaviour. Indi worries about failing her HSC. Romeo deliberately fails his because he loves her and wants to be with her. However, Indi passes her HSC and she begins a business studies course at university. Romeo starts to question his relationship with Indi and he believes she is going to break up with him. Indi leaves Romeo some cryptic clues for a special night she has planned for him, but he fails to turn up. Ruby later tells Indi that she and Romeo had sex. Romeo tries to apologise, but Indi insists they are over. Indi meets Kieran Monroe (Andrew Hazzard) at a party. Romeo warns Indi not to go out with him, but she refuses to listen. When Kieran turns nasty one night, Indi calls Romeo to rescue her.

Romeo professes his feelings for Indi and they get back together. Nicole leaves Summer Bay, leaving Indi upset. Romeo invites Indi to accompany him and Roo Stewart (Georgie Parker) to Hawaii to attend a tourism exhibition. Their host, Marty Jones (Matty Lui), later offers Indi a job. Romeo proposes and she accepts. They decide to get married straight away. Sid arrives and interrupts the wedding, but he gives Romeo and Indi his blessing and they marry. On their return home, they move in with Roo. When they struggle financially, they move into the Farmhouse. Indi turns against Roo when she discovers she is seeing Sid, however they later make up. Sid learns he has another daughter called Sasha (Demi Harman). He brings her home to meet Indi and Dex and they eventually bond. Indi secures an internship with Dennis Harling (Danny Roberts), but she gives Romeo a hard time about their financial situation when he opens a surf school. Things get worse when Romeo admits to lending a large amount of money to his sister, Mink. Indi urges him to get a job with the new resort. Sasha admits that her boyfriend, Stu (Brenton Thwaites), has been hitting her. Dex and Indi suspect Sid of Stu's murder when his body turns up, but Sasha confesses it was her fault. Romeo leaves his job in sales to start surfing in competitions, which annoys Indi. They talk and she eventually supports him.

When she discovers Ruby is attending the competitions with Romeo, she decides to trust him. Indi is introduced to Logan Meyer (David Berry), who makes it clear he is interested in her. When she decides to surprise Romeo in his room one night, Indi finds Ruby there and jumps to the wrong conclusion. Indi goes out with Logan and Ruby sees them together. Romeo tries to persuade her to make their marriage work and she agrees. Logan gives Indi some expensive earring and they later kiss. Romeo and Indi realise they got married too young. Indi continues to see Logan, who buys her a dress for an evening out. Romeo insinuates she is a gold-digger and he later begins dating Ruby. Indi becomes concerned for Romeo, when she learns he has had an accident. She tries to visit him in the hospital, but Ruby stops her and asks her to leave. Indi tells Romeo that she is in debt and is thinking of dropping out of university. Romeo later transfers some money into Indi's account and tells her to pay it back when she can. Logan learns Indi still has feelings for Romeo and they break up. Indi learns Ruby is pregnant and she resolves to stay away from Romeo. However, Ruby later confesses she made the pregnancy up and Indi allows Romeo to stay the night at the farm. Romeo confesses that he still loves Indi and he attempts to kiss her, but she asks him to leave. She later tells him to break up with Ruby if he wants to move on and he does. Indi bonds with Liam Murphy (Axle Whitehead) and he later gives her a job at the restaurant.

Ruby cuts the brake cables on Indi's car as an act of revenge but Dexter borrows the car and crashes sustaining a life-threatening head injury. As Ruby has left a voicemail on Indi's phone warning her not to drive the car it is clear who the culprit is and she ends up confessing and going to jail. Indi and Romeo get back together although they still have a turbulent relationship. They re-open the gym in the Surf Club and it seems like their life is good. However, Romeo learns that he has skin cancer and together with Sid they keep it a secret from Indi. Indi suspects something is going on, but no one will tell her. Romeo leaves the Bay, unable to tell Indi that he has cancer and with the intention of sparing her watching him die. Indi is devastated and eventually Sid tells her Romeo has cancer. Indi tries to find Romeo, but later gives up. She begins a relationship with Chris Harrington (Johnny Ruffo) and carries on running the gym, employing Casey (Lincoln Younes) and Heath Braxton (Dan Ewing) to help her. Indi later discovers that Romeo has died of his illness and she is devastated and grief-stricken. She scatters his ashes with Dex and Sasha and starts having recurring dreams about him. She also ends her relationship with Chris, feeling that she is betraying Romeo's memory. After reassessing her life, Indi decides to leave the Bay to travel overseas and leaves the gym in Casey and Heath's hands. Sid then drives her, Dex and April to the airport. It is later mentioned that she now lives in Copenhagen, Denmark.

== Reception ==
For her portrayal of Indigo, Weaving was nominated for Best Female Performance at the 2011 AACTA Television Awards. Weaving's look has been compared to former character Tasha Andrews (Isabel Lucas) and AdelaideNow commented that scriptwriters wasted no time in having the character stripped off into her bikini on the beach, they also stated they could see why. Holy Soap describe her most memorable moment as being: "Falling through a coffee table after smoking marijuana, an accident which put her in hospital."
