= Dexter Walker =

- Home and Away character
- Portrayed by: Thom Green (2009); Charles Cottier (2010–2013)
- Duration: 2009–2013
- First appearance: 30 July 2009
- Last appearance: 13 November 2013
- Introduced by: Cameron Welsh
In-universe information
- Occupation: Student at Summer Bay High (2009, 2010–11); Student at Yabbie Creek University (2012–13); Trainee nurse (2012–)
- Father: Sid Walker
- Mother: Jody Walker
- Sisters: Indigo Walker
- Half-sisters: Sasha Bezmel
- Wife: April Scott (2013–)

Dexter "Dex" Walker is a fictional character from the Australian soap opera Home and Away, played by Charles Cottier. He made his first screen appearance during the episode broadcast on 30 July 2009. Thom Green originated the role, but when the Walker family returned in 2010, Cottier took over the part. Cottier quit the role in early 2013 and Dexter made his last appearance on 13 November 2013.

== Creation and casting ==
In July 2009, it was announced that the Walker family would be introduced to Home and Away for a five-week guest stint. Actor Tom Green was cast in the role of Dexter Walker, the son of Sid (Robert Mammone) and Jody Walker (Victoria Haralabidou) and brother to Indigo (Samara Weaving). A year later, Dexter, Sid and Indigo made a permanent return to Home and Away. Green did not continue in the role of Dexter and Charles Cottier was cast instead. Cottier auditioned for the role on the Gold Coast and he received a call asking him to come to Sydney the following day. Shortly after that, he learned that he had won the role of Dexter. Of his casting, Cottier stated "I'm so happy to be joining Home and Away. Moving from Brisbane was a big step, but the cast and crew have gone out of their way to make me feel at home." In 2011, Cottier admitted that initially he had been "slightly intimidated" about taking over the role from Green. Cottier revealed "I sometimes hang out with Tom Green - he's a really nice guy - but I chose not to watch what he'd done. I think Dex is quite a different character now, too."

== Development ==
Upon his return in 2010, Dexter has a "different personality". Of this Cottier said, "I think he's more mature, from what I've heard. And he's hilarious. He's funny." He added that Dexter "doesn't really turn it off". Channel Five's soap opera reporting website Holy Soap describe him as a "quick-witted and sensitive schoolboy". Holy Soap also add that Dexter is "very funny and sarcastic", but he loves his family deeply. Seven Network comment that Dexter "wears his sense of humour like a suit of armour". Describing the character in an interview with the official Home and Away website, Cottier said: "He's quite a strange boy. He's funny and quirky and I think he finds it a little bit difficult to make friends." He added that on the inside Dexter is "quite a sweet person and quite vulnerable".

Following his return, Dexter falls in love with Sid's new partner Marilyn Chambers (Emily Symons). Cottier told Inside Soap magazine that the storyline was embarrassing because of the age difference between the characters. Of this, Cottier explained: "It was one of the first things I read about the character, and I was kind of embarrassed, but excited to do it! Not every guy comes to Summer Bay and falls in love with a woman 20 years older than he is. My friends gave me grief about that! I got to work with Emily Symons though, and she's fantastic."

In July 2013, Cottier's co-star Teri Haddy (Rosie Prichard) confirmed to a TV Week reporter that he would be leaving the show, along with Rhiannon Fish (April Scott). Haddy commented "I think because they have both been on the show for so long, they wanted to start a brand new chapter. I want it to be a really positive ending for April and Dex, and an open-ended one."

== Storylines ==
Dexter and his family move to Summer Bay after his father, Sid, finds employment at the local hospital, covering for Doctor Rachel Armstrong (Amy Mathews) while she takes maternity leave. Dexter meets Annie Campbell (Charlotte Best) and takes a liking to her. He comforts Annie following the death of her friend Belle Taylor (Jessica Tovey) making Annie's former partner Jai Fernandez (Jordan Rodrigues) jealous. When Jai confronts Annie about her friendship with Dexter, he shows her a photograph that Dexter printed of her. Annie shows Dexter the photo and asks why he printed it. Dexter tells Annie that it was for a photo album he made of the last photos that Belle took. Dexter is upset when Annie refers to him as a friend. When Annie tries to talk to Dexter, he kisses her but she pulls away. Dexter apologises and Annie kisses him. They then begin a relationship. Jai discovers their relationship and Dexter tells Jai that Annie is happy with him. Annie ends their relationship because she does not want to hurt Jai's feelings. When Indigo is injured at a party, Jody returns and tells Sid that she is taking Dexter and his sister Indigo (Samara Weaving) with her. Dexter is unhappy, but Indigo convinces him to leave Summer Bay.

The following year, Dexter arrives at Sid's house along with Indigo, where they reveal that they are not moving to Europe with Jody. Dexter, Sid and Indigo return to Summer Bay and move into The Farmhouse. He re-enrolls at Summer Bay High School. Dexter meets Sid's new partner Marilyn Chambers and develops feelings for her. He then sends her some flowers anonymously. Dexter invites himself for dinner with Marilyn and Sid. Dexter makes jibes about Sid throughout the dinner to make Marilyn notice him. He visits Marilyn and asks her personal questions. After Marilyn tells him, Sid confronts Dexter who explains that he is looking out for him. When Sid organises a picnic with Marilyn, Dexter helps him get it ready. Dexter lies to Marilyn telling her that they have to go to the picnic alone and wait for Sid to join them. When Sid does not arrive, Marilyn discovers messages from him on her phone and realises that Dexter lied because he has feelings for her. Dexter writes Marilyn a letter and gives it to her before quickly leaving. Later, he goes to see Marilyn who tells him that she is going to show the letter to Sid. Dexter becomes worried and tells her that the letter was a creative writing exercise for school. Dexter visits Marilyn once again and when she receives news of Alf Stewart's (Ray Meagher) arrest, he comforts her. Marilyn questions Dexter, wondering whether he has feelings for her, but he denies it and leaves. As Dexter prepares to tell Marilyn about his feelings, she calls wanting to invite Sid for dinner. Marilyn also offers Dexter an invite to which he agrees. He tells Sid that it was the hospital calling and want him to work. Dexter arrives at Marilyn's and tells her that Sid is working. Dexter admits to Marilyn that he has feelings for her, leaving her stunned. Sid insists that Dexter should apologise and he goes to see Marilyn, telling her he still has feelings for her. Marilyn leaves and Dexter meets her friend Mitzy Fraser (Helen Dallimore), who tells him that Marilyn does not have any feelings for him. Mitzy then kisses him to show how he is pushing his feelings onto Marilyn. Dexter tells Sid and Marilyn and apologises for developing feelings for Marilyn. Sid and Indigo become worried about Dexter and Marilyn talks to him, helping him move on from his feelings for her. Mitzy apologises to Dexter and he forgives her.

Dexter buys a goldfish and meets Adrian Hall (Phoebe Tonkin) who works at the pet store. He returns to the store for pet supplies and arranges a date. He meets Adrian at the Surf club and after becoming worried, leaves the date to asks Indigo for advice. On returning he discovers that Adrian has left, leaving a note telling him not to call her again. Dexter goes to see Adrian and apologises to her, explaining why he left. Adrian forgives him and tells him that she knows why he acts the way he does. Dexter receives advice from April Scott (Rhiannon Fish) about how to speak to women. He then goes to talk to Adrian and try to resume their relationship. However, Dexter reveals that April told him what to say and Adrian leaves. He visits Adrian again after Marilyn tells him that she might not be interested in him. Adrian tells him that Marilyn is correct and they agree to be just friends. Dexter meets Detective Graves (Eryn Jean Norvill) and takes a liking to her. He decides to wear a suit to impress her, but Sid refuses to let him leave wearing it. Dexter then truants from school to meet her, but she remains uninterested. He sends Detective Graves a bouquet of flowers asking her out on a date. She initially refuses but Robert Robertson (Socratis Otto) encourages her to go to find information on the murder of Penn Graham (Christian Clark). During the date, Detective Graves becomes charmed by Dexter and at the end of the night he asks her if they could meet again. She then confesses that the date was a set-up. However, when Detective Graves tells him to get over his need to replace his mother with an older woman, Dexter takes a dislike to her.

Leah Patterson-Baker (Ada Nicodemou) asks Dexter to talk to her son VJ Patterson (Felix Dean) who is starting secondary school, about attending Summer Bay High. Dexter begins filming people with a video camera and is caught by Casey Braxton (Lincoln Younes) who is a member of a surfing gang named The River Boys. Dexter is kidnapped by two of the gang's members, who leave him in the forest. Dexter later returns home. Sometime afterwards Dexter and his group of friends go on a camping trip. Dexter is interested romantically in April but she is already dating Dexter's friend Xavier Austin (David Jones Roberts). Dexter takes Kate Hanlon (Mikayla Southgate) on the trip to make April jealous. April later begins a relationship with Dexter Behind Xavier's back. Xavier finds out about Dexter's relationship with April when he sees them kissing. Xavier is furious and punches Dexter in the nose. The two later become friends again. Dexter finds out that he has a half-sister, Sasha Bezmel (Demi Harman). Shortly afterwards Dexter sees naked pictures of Sasha around school and is furious. Dexter and April plan to sleep with each other after the upcoming year 12 formal. Dexter attends the year 12 formal. Dallas Phillips (Emma Griffin) kisses Dexter just as April enters. April later ends their relationship. Dexter becomes a nurse at Summer Bay Hospital. His first patient is Dallas's son William (Daniel Place). Dexter finds out that Dallas is living in her car and gets her a job at the Gelato Bar. Dexter is jealous when April begins to date Heath Braxton (Dan Ewing). Dexter and the rest of the Walker family discover that Sasha has been assaulted repeatedly by her boyfriend Stu Henderson (Brenton Thwaites). Dexter and Xavier look for Stu with the intention of confronting him but he has disappeared. Stu is later found dead.

Dexter meets Lottie Ryan (Morgan Weaving) at the Diner and the two become friends. April, Who has broken up with Heath becomes jealous of Dexter's and Lottie's friendship when Colleen Smart (Lyn Collingwood) tells her that they are dating when they are, in fact, not. April invites herself to a picnic that Dexter and Lottie organise. When Dexter asks April to leave April falls and pretends to hurt her ankle so that Dexter will take care of her. At the hospital April reveals that there is nothing wrong with her ankle and that she only said it was hurt to get close to Dexter. April tells Dexter that she loves him but Dexter tells April he cannot love somebody who is so deceitful. Dexter later begins a relationship with Lottie. However, he realises he loves April and they break up. April confesses that she love Dex too and they get back together. Dex and April struggle to find some time to themselves and decide to move in together. Sid and Bianca give their approval and they find a place. On moving day, Dex borrows Indi's car and crashes it, when the brakes fail to work. Dex is found and taken to hospital where it is revealed he has major injuries. Dex almost dies, but Sid saves him. Ruby Buckton (Rebecca Breeds) later admits that she cut the brake line, but did not intend for Dex to get hurt.

Dex is diagnosed with a brain injury, leaving him initially unable to speak. April refuses to leave his side during his hospital stay despite Dex's attempts to push her away. Sid had considered sending him to a rehab facility which specialises in brain injury but changes his mind after Dex vehemently refuses to go anywhere except back home. Sasha, in particular, has difficulty coming to terms with Dex's disabilities. Dex begins to train as a nurse but struggles with seizures, which often take place as a result of stress. He lies to April about his seizures, much to her chagrin. For some time he contemplates quitting as he feared that he would be a danger to patients. Dex proposes to April and she accepts. April gets a work placement in Paris and the couple move there straight after their wedding with Sid driving them and Indi to the airport.

== Reception ==
Holy Soap describe Dexter's most memorable moment as: "Doing his best impression of David Attenborough to report on the breakdown of his family's car as they drove back to Summer Bay." In December 2010, Cottier received a nomination in the "Most Popular New Male Talent" category at the 2011 TV Week Logie Awards. Sarah Ellis of Inside Soap said that the magazine's staff love Dexter and were upset at the prospect of him remaining single, when April reconciled with Xavier.
