= The Cut (Australian TV series) =

Television series

- Genre: Drama
- Created by: John Misto
- Written by: John Misto
- Directed by: Mandy Smith; Karl Zwicky
- Starring: John Wood; Matt Passmore
- Composers: Paul Berton; Stewart D'Arrietta
- Country of origin: Australia
- No. of seasons: 1
- No. of episodes: 6

Production
- Executive producers: Miranda Dear; Amanda Higgs
- Producer: Tom Blacket
- Production locations: Sydney, New South Wales
- Running time: 60 minutes
- Production company: Blacket Television Production

Original release
- Network: ABC1
- Release: 23 February – 30 March 2009

The Cut is an Australian television drama series which screened in 2009 on ABC1. The series comprises six one-hour episodes, starring John Wood and written by John Misto.

== Synopsis ==
The Cut is the story of Bill Telford, a colourful sporting identity (player/manager/agent), who has fallen on his feet in the past decade as Australian professional sports have boomed. Bill is injured in a bomb attack in Bangkok. His estranged son, Andrew, is reluctantly persuaded by his mother to return to Sydney and run the business until Bill recovers. Andrew uncovers financial disaster and must confront several skeletons in the closet.

== Cast ==
- John Wood as 'Wild' Bill Telford
- Matt Passmore as Andrew Telford
- Ben Oxenbould as Danny
- Julieanne Newbould as Roz Telford
- Eloise Oxer as Naomi
- Diarmid Heidenreich as Jason Kerslake
- Ria Vandervis as Vanessa Stewart
- Kelly Butler as Sandy Haffner
- Paul Barry as Karl
- Ian Roberts as Sports Beat Anchor
- John McNeil as Stan
- Bill Young as Ray
- Matthew Walker
- Simmone Jade Mackinnon as Dominova Blaine
- Alan David Lee as Jimmy Bartlett
- Lani Tupu as Norberto Silva

== Episode list ==
No. in season	Title	Directed by	Written by	Original release date	Aus. viewers (millions)
1	"A Little Bit of Beef"	Mandy Smith	John Misto	23 February 2009	0.562
2	"The Best Sex I Ever Had"	Mandy Smith	John Misto	2 March 2009	0.479
3	"Picking The Seam"	Mandy Smith	John Misto	9 March 2009	0.399
4	"Pursed Lips"	Karl Zwicky	John Misto	16 March 2009	0.381
5	"A Falcon’s Tail"	Karl Zwicky	John Misto	23 March 2009	0.452
6	"Brain Snap"	Karl Zwicky	John Misto	30 March 2009	0.314

== Production ==
The Cut was first announced in February 2008 and was filmed in June/July 2008.

== See also ==
- List of Australian television series
- List of programs broadcast by ABC (Australian TV network)
