= Matthew Walker (Australian actor) =

New Zealand-Australian actor

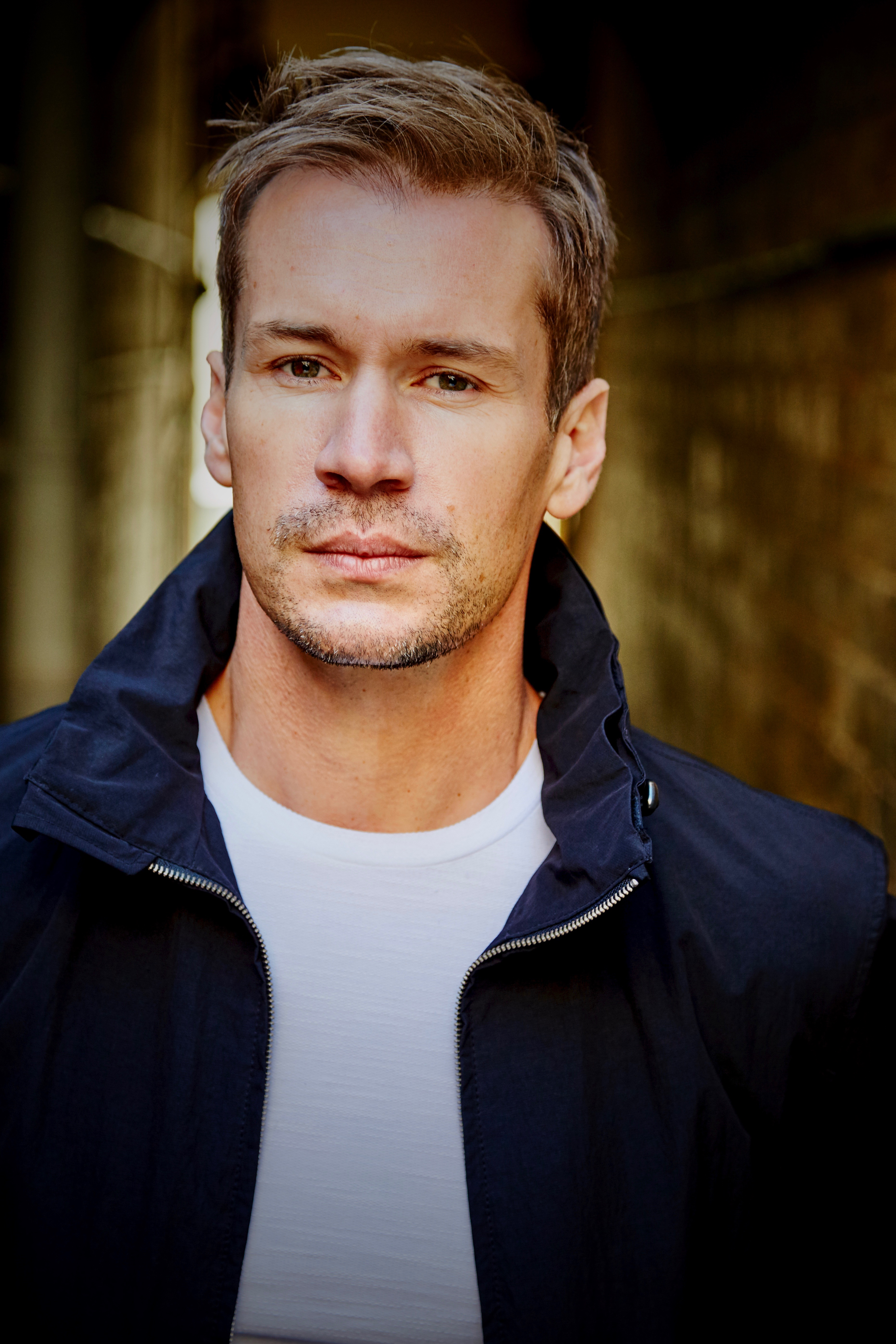
- Born: 11 May 1979 (age 46); Hamilton, New Zealand
- Occupation: Actor
- Years active: 2004–present
- Known for: Straight Forward; Filthy Rich; Home and Away; Hercules: The Legendary Journeys headLand; The Children of Huang Shi; Shortland Street

Matthew Walker is a New Zealand–born Australian-trained actor and performer.

== Early life ==
Walker was born on 11 May 1982 in Hamilton, New Zealand.

Walker trained at the prestigious National Institute of Dramatic Art (NIDA), Australia's leading drama school, boasting graduates such as Cate Blanchett, Toni Collette and Sam Worthington. He was accepted into NIDA in 2002, after auditioning alongside over 4,000 other people for the 20 places in the school's acting course. He graduated in 2004.

Walker also completed a business and arts degree at Victoria University of Wellington, majoring in marketing, and theatre and film.

== Career ==
=== Television ===
Walker played the leading role of Adam Martini in Danish / New Zealand co-production Straight Forward. Described as an 'international crime caper', the big budget 8-part series was filmed in Auckland, Queenstown and Copenhagen.

He appeared in the TVNZ drama Dirty Laundry as bad guy Nikki Rossini, and played a recurring character, Ford Hathaway, in the second season of TVNZ's Filthy Rich. He also played Vince Cully, a recurring character in the final season of Australian Channel 7 series 800 Words.

Walker is well known for his role as Justin Jefferies, the elder brother of Aden Jefferies in the popular Channel 7 soap Home and Away.

Other television credits include Rake, The Cut (for the ABC), and Legend of the Seeker (for Disney). Walker played Dr. Karl Vanderbeck in New Zealand's popular prime time drama series Shortland Street in 2020-2021.

=== Film ===
Walker appeared in Chinese war epic The Children of Huang Shi alongside Jonathan Rhys-Meyers.

=== Stage ===
Walker has appeared on-stage in Much Ado About Nothing at the Sydney Opera House with the Bell Shakespeare Company, in the world premiere of Colder with Griffin Theatre Company and in the Australasian premiere of Tracey Letts' Bug. He also played Lysander in A Midsummer Night's Dream by Mendelssohn with the Sydney Symphony Orchestra under Vladimir Ashkenazy.

== Filmography ==
=== Film ===
| Year | Title | Role | Notes |
|---|---|---|---|
| 2008 | The Children of Huang Shi | Andy Fischer | Feature film |
| 2009 | Vinyl | DJ | Short film |
| 2021 | Love Knots | William 'Will' Calvin | TV film |

=== Television ===
| Year | Title | Role | Notes |
|---|---|---|---|
| 1998 | Hercules: The Legendary Journeys | Tiresius | TV series, 1 episode |
| 2002 | Dark Knight | Outlaw son | TV series, 1 episode |
| 2005-06 | headLand | Heath Forbes (main) | TV series |
| 2009 | Legend of the Seeker | Kieran | TV series, 1 episode |
| 2009 | The Cut | Nathan Bailey / Kerry Bailey (Identical twins) | TV series, 2 episodes |
| 2010 | Rake | Bill Hampton (Advisor) | TV series, 2 episodes |
| 2010 | Home and Away | Justin Jefferies (main) | TV series |
| 2016 | Dirty Laundry | Nikki Rossini | TV series, 4 episodes |
| 2017 | Filthy Rich | Ford Hathaway | TV series, season 2, 4 episodes |
| 2017-18 | 800 Words | Vince Cully (recurring) | TV series, final season |
| 2019 | Straight Forward | Adam Martini | TV series, 7 episodes |
| 2020-21 | Shortland Street | Dr. Karl Vanderbeck (main) | TV series |

=== Directing ===
| Year | Title | Role | Notes |
|---|---|---|---|
| 2022 | Small Waves | Director | Short film |

== Stage ==
| Year | Title | Role | Notes |
|---|---|---|---|
| 2006 | The Mediator | | East Village Hotel with The Judas Tree |
| 2006 | Romeo and Juliet | Abraham / Benvolio | Bell Shakespeare Company |
| 2008 | Colder | David Norman | World premiere at Stables Theatre with Griffin Theatre Company |
| 2009 | Sydney Ghosts Story | Various characters | Old Fitzroy Theatre |
| 2009 | A Midsummer Night's Dream | Lysander & Francis Flute / Thisbe | Sydney Theatre Company & Sydney Symphony Orchestra |
| 2010 | Bug | Peter Evens | Australasian premiere at SBW Stables Theatre with Griffin Theatre Company / Picture This Productions |
| 2011 | Othello | Cassio | Peach Theatre Company |
| 2011 | Much Ado About Nothing | Don Pedro | Sydney Opera House, The Playhouse Canberra, Playhouse, Melbourne with Bell Shakespeare Company |
