= Charles Cottier =

Australian actor

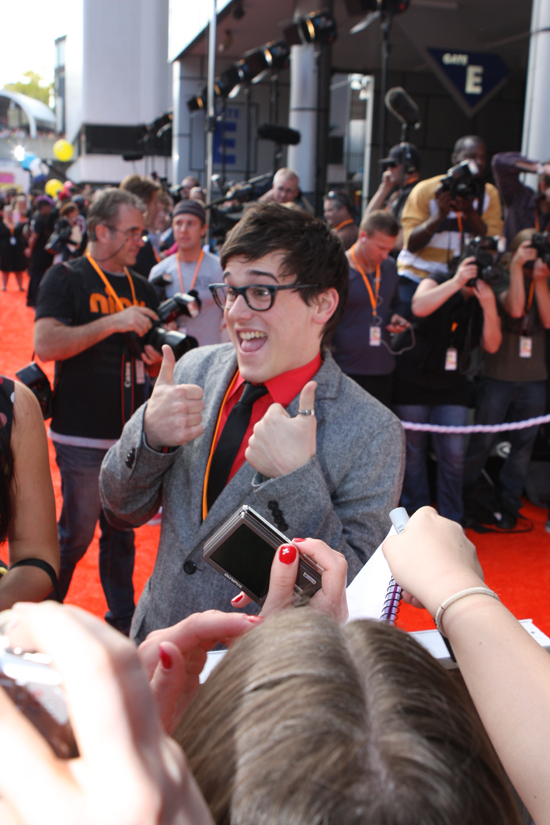
- Cottier attends the Nickelodeon Kid's Choice Awards 2011
- Born: 27 October 1992 (age 34); Brisbane, Queensland, Australia
- Occupation: Actor
- Years active: 2010–present

Charles Cottier (born 27 October 1992) is an Australian actor, perhaps best known for portraying Dexter Walker on the Australian soap opera Home and Away.

== Early life ==
Cottier was born in Brisbane, Australia, completed primary school at Kenmore South State School and secondary school at Brisbane Boys' College. He always wanted to be an actor and loved performing in home videos from a young age. He grew up in a close knit family of three boys (one older and one younger brother). Cottier started taking acting classes at the age of twelve at The Australian Acting Academy and graduated from secondary school in 2009, where he was drama captain.

Cottier enjoys playing music, something that runs in his family; his dad plays guitar, brothers play saxophone and piano. Cottier himself has played drums since aged nine and was part of indie rock bands in Brisbane, including We Were Arks, NALI and a three piece band called Mods and Cons.

== Career ==
Cottier auditioned for the role of Dexter Walker in Home and Away on the Gold Coast, and got a call back to come to Sydney the next day. Then the following day he found out he got the role. Cottier is the second person to play Dexter as the role was previously played by Tom Green. In 2011, Cottier was nominated for a Logie Award for Most Popular New Male Talent. Cottier left Home and Away in 2013. He joined the cast of Please Like Me in February 2014. In 2015, he appeared in the third series of Miss Fisher's Murder Mysteries with former Home and Away star, Ella Scott Lynch, who played Hayley Smith in 2005.

In 2016, Cottier featured in the Channel Seven series Wanted with Rebecca Gibney and former Home and Away co-star Stephen Peacocke. Cottier and Peacocke were reunited in the feature film Cooped Up, in which Cottier plays the lead, Jake.

In 2024, Cottier filmed the role of Luke in the fantasy horror film Dusk.

== Filmography ==
Year	Title	Role	Notes
2010–13	Home and Away	Dexter Walker	Regular role
2014	Please Like Me	Patrick	Regular role
2015	Miss Fisher's Murder Mysteries	Terence Lawson	Guest role
2016–2017	Wanted	David Buckley	Regular role
2016	Cooped Up	Jake Ridge	Film
2018	The Confession	Jake	Short film
2019	The Pet Killer	Brooks	Regular role
2020	My Birthday Romance	Kyle	Film
2022	The Curious Case of Dolphin Bay	Nate	Film
2022	Irreverent	Guido	Guest role
2024	The Demon Disorder	Phillip	Film
2024	Dusk	Luke	Film
