= Cameron Welsh =

Australian actor, writer, producer and director

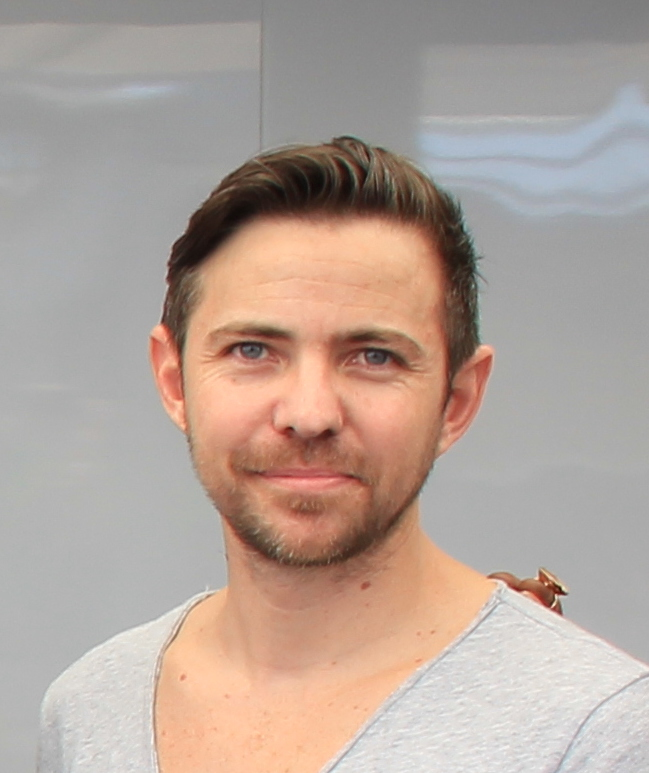
- Born: 9 March 1977 (age 49); Muswellbrook, New South Wales, Australia
- Occupations: actor; writer; producer; director
- Known for: Home and Away, The Last Ship
- Spouse: Julie McGauran (m. 2007)
- Children: 2

Cameron Welsh (born 9 March 1977) is an Australian actor, writer, producer and director, best known for his role as Mitch McColl on Australian soap opera Home and Away from 1999 until 2001; he then went on to become the series producer from 2007 until 2012.

== Career ==
In 1999, Welsh auditioned for a guest role in the Channel Seven soap opera Home and Away. Through his audition he secured the regular role of Mitch McColl. In 2000, Welsh was diagnosed with a herniated disc in his back and Producers granted Welsh a six-week break. The serial hired Mitchell McMahon to play Mitch in Welsh's absence. He was nominated for a Logie Award in 2000 for "Most Popular New Male Talent". Welsh decided to quit the role and Mitch's final scenes aired in early 2001.

He went on to direct for Home and Away. Welsh's other directing credits include All Saints and Blue Heelers.

In 2005, Welsh filmed a cameo for the serial's 4000th episode, which saw Mitch return for Alf Stewart's (Ray Meagher) birthday.

Welsh became series producer of Home and Away in 2007. He took over the role from Julie McGauran, whom he married in April 2007. They have two children. In January 2012, Welsh stepped down from his role as the producer of Home and Away. Welsh said he had enjoyed his twelve years working on the drama and was looking forward to future projects.

After Home and Away, Welsh worked extensively in American television, producing and writing on series such as TNT's The Last Ship, Starz's Ash vs Evil Dead, Syfy's Krypton,, Constantine, and Foundation, which premiered on Apple TV+ in September 2021. He was the series producer of Nautilus.
