= April Scott (Home and Away) =

- Home and Away character
- Portrayed by: Rhiannon Fish
- Duration: 2010–2013
- First appearance: 15 June 2010
- Last appearance: 13 November 2013
- Introduced by: Cameron Welsh
In-universe information
- Occupation: Student at Summer Bay High (2010–2012); Waitress (2010); Medical student (2013–)
- Mother: Joanna Scott
- Half-sisters: Bianca Scott
- Husband: Dexter Walker (2013–)
- Nephews: Rocco Scott-Braxton

April Scott is a fictional character from the Australian soap opera Home and Away, played by Rhiannon Fish. The actress successfully auditioned for the role of April and she described the process as quick. Fish's role in the soap was announced in May 2010 and she made her first on screen appearance as April on 15 June 2010. In April 2013, it was announced that Fish had decided to leave Home and Away and April departed on 13 November 2013.

Before her arrival on screen, April was described as being "worldly, intelligent and quick witted" by a writer for The Daily Telegraph. April has travelled the world and has become independent and wise beyond her years because of it. She is passionate, has strong opinions and stands up for what she believes in. With her outgoing and thoughtful nature, April makes friends easily. She has a unique and quirky dress sense and likes to reinvent her outfits, not caring what other people think of her style. April has a fiery relationship with her half-sister, Bianca (Lisa Gormley). Fish said she enjoys playing April, especially as she has gone on quite a journey during her time on the show.

April's storylines initially focused on her relationship with Xavier Austin (David Jones-Roberts) and her views on environmental issues. April tried to get bottled water banned in Summer Bay with Xavier's help and she stole chemicals from the high school as a form of protest. When April doubts her abilities and begins to write her assignments over and over, she is diagnosed with OCD. Fish revealed this was one of her favourite storylines. April breaks up with Xavier and enters into a relationship with his best friend, Dexter Walker (Charles Cottier). A notable storyline for April saw her self-medicate in order to deal with the stress caused by her HSC exams. Following her break up with Dexter, April decides to lose her virginity and ends up having a one-night stand with Heath Braxton (Daniel Ewing).

== Casting ==
On 23 May 2010, a reporter for The Daily Telegraph announced Fish had joined the cast of Home and Away as April Scott. Of the audition process, Fish told the official Home and Away website, "It all happened so quickly. Monday was my first audition, I got a call back on Friday and by the next Monday I was sitting in the Home and Away make-up chair." Fish was in an airport at the time she learned she had won the part of April. The actress admitted that she started "crying hysterically" upon hearing the news. Fish commented that she had watched Home and Away her whole life and was nervous about meeting the cast. She made her screen debut as April during the episode broadcast on 15 June 2010.

== Development ==
=== Characterisation ===
"I love playing her...and the cool thing is that she's gone on quite a journey. She started off as this kind of boring, standard schoolgirl, and then I got to do the whole OCD storyline, and now...she's really changing and growing up, which is really fun, to stick to the character as they do that."

— Fish speaking to S-press about April's development (2011)

Shortly before she arrived on screen, April was described as being "worldly, intelligent and quick witted." The Metro said April was "fun-loving" and Fish branded her character passionate and unique. The actress told the official Home and Away website that April does not care that she is different from other people. Fish added "She has strong opinions on everything from the environment to fashion and is not afraid to express those and be herself." April is fluent in several languages and has travelled the world, living in many foreign cities and cultures. Through her travels April became "independent and worldly wise beyond her years", she has a wealth of experiences that set her apart from those around her. With her open mindedness and outgoing nature, April makes friends easily. She is intelligent, thoughtful and caring. Channel 5 said April stands up for what she believes in and is committed to causes like saving the environment. Holy Soap said April "has a unique and quirky sense of style." April likes to wear clothes that have the "occasional nod to fashion", but she often reinvents an outfit to suit her style and does not care what others think of it.

April and her sister, Bianca (Lisa Gormley), share a mother, Joanna (Tara Morice), but they have different fathers. April's father is French, while Bianca's is Italian. April and her sister have a fiery, but supportive relationship. In February 2011, Susan Hill of Daily Star reported April would have a breakdown over her schoolwork. April doubts her abilities and she begins rewriting her assignments over and over again. Dexter Walker (Charles Cottier) notices April's behaviour and he asks her to take a break from her studies, but April refuses and Dex realises she needs some help. April becomes stressed and she cannot cope with the amount of pressure she puts on herself. April is diagnosed with OCD and Fish said the storyline has been her favourite to portray. The actress told Katharine Rivett of teen magazine S-press that as she is interested in psychology and similar areas, she did a lot of research into the disorder, so she could understand it.

=== Relationships with Xavier and Dexter ===
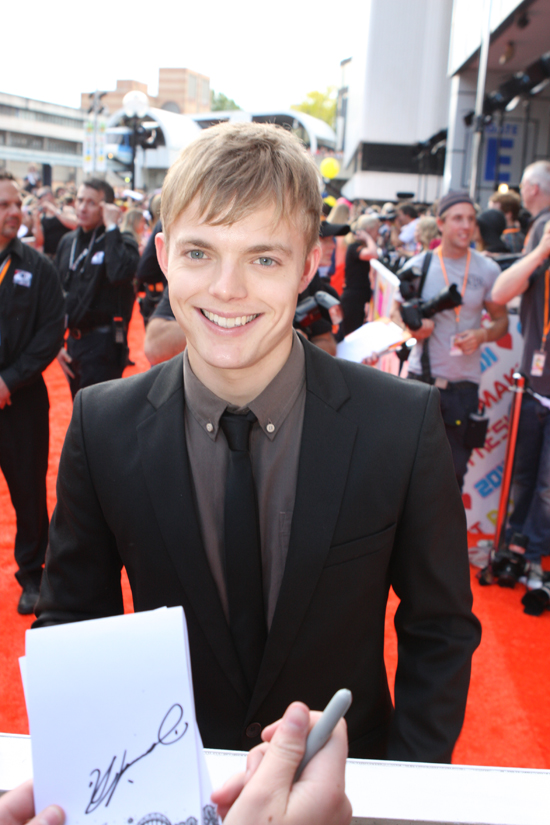
David Jones-Roberts plays April's first love interest, Xavier Austin.

Shortly after her arrival in Summer Bay, April meets and takes a shine to Xavier Austin (David Jones-Roberts). April comes across Xavier on the pier and watches him throw photos of himself and his ex-girlfriend, Ruby Buckton (Rebecca Breeds), into the sea. April is not impressed and she orders him to retrieve the photos. Xavier then jumps into the sea to gather them all up. Of April and Xavier's first meeting, Fish said "She notices very quickly that he's kind of special and a little bit different from the other boys she's been with in the past. As soon as she points out he's doing something bad to the environment he leaps off the pier and gets the pictures out. She likes what she sees." When asked if the character's connection would develop into something more, Fish said April would like there to be a romance between herself and Xavier. However, April would encounter a few obstacles along the way and Fish added it is a question of whether Xavier would man up and take April.

Xavier and April eventually begin a relationship. When April wants to see water bottles banned in the Bay, Xavier blackmails his step-father, John Palmer (Shane Withington) into presenting her idea to the council. April is angry with Xavier when she learns about the blackmail and warns him to stop. Xavier agrees to help April with her next scheme, but is shocked when he learns she has stolen some chemicals from the school. Xavier begs April to get rid of the chemicals, so they do not get into trouble with his mother, Gina (Sonia Todd). Inside Soap said April "reluctantly" agrees and they pour the liquids down the sink, but they do not realise the chemicals are lethal. Both April and Xavier pass out after inhaling the fumes, but April recovers and goes for help. Colleen Smart (Lyn Collingwood) finds April on the beach and she taken to the hospital. Bianca finds Xavier and he is also taken to the hospital.

In 2011, April breaks up with Xavier to be with his best friend, Dexter Walker. However, she does not inform Xavier of the real reason she is breaking up with him, leaving him confused. Xavier decides to go in search of April to find out the reason behind their break-up. At the same time, she is discussing how to tell him the truth with Dex and Susan Hill of the Daily Star said "the pair can't keep their hands off each other." Xavier sees April kissing Dex and he is devastated. He then tells his friends to stay away from him. April and Dex continue their relationship, but when April witnesses Dex kissing another girl, she is devastated and breaks up with him. Before the incident, April decides that she is ready to lose her virginity to Dex on the night of a schoolies party. Of this, Fish said "I guess she just realises how much she loves him and makes the decision that she's ready to take their relationship to the next level."

However, April is forced to stay home and care for Irene Roberts (Lynne McGranger), who is sick from her chemotherapy treatment. She insists Dex goes to the party with his friends as she trusts him completely. At the party, Dex catches the eye of Dallas Phillips (Emma Griffin). Dalles comes onto Dex, who tries to resist her advances. Cottier told Erin Miller of TV Week that Dex has never had a girl come onto him the way Dallas does and before he knows it he is kissing her. Dex is unaware April has decided to go to the party after all and has spotted him kissing Dallas. He tries to apologise to her the next day, but April informs him their relationship is over as she no longer trusts him. Fish said her character is a strong girl and the second Dex breaks her heart, she realises they are done as she does not want to get hurt again.

=== Self-medication ===
In October 2011, Fish revealed April would begin "dabbling in drugs" due to the stress caused by her HSC exams. April struggles with her studies and when she notices Dex appears to be breezing through his with ease, she becomes frustrated and begins to investigate ways to improve her results. Fish told Erin Miller of TV Week that April is the type of person who puts a lot of pressure on herself. While she is accompanying Irene Roberts (Lynne McGranger) to her chemotherapy session, April meets a student who tells her about a drug that could help her stay awake and study. April approaches Heath Braxton (Daniel Ewing) and asks him if he can supply her with the drug. Heath turns April down and he becomes concerned about her. Fish said "Heath has a lot of flaws, but when it comes down to it, he can be a good guy." April then comes up with a plan to steal Sid Walker's (Robert Mammone) prescription pad. She takes advantage of a moment alone at the Walker house and takes the pad. Fish explained "The fact it's illegal doesn't cross her mind; she just needs something to help her make it through the exams." April then offers to collect Irene's medication from the chemist and she gets the study drug for herself. The drug works and April is able to stay up all night and study. She later invites herself over to Dex's house for dinner, so she can return the prescription pad.

TV Soap said it starts to become obvious that April "is becoming more and more on edge." Bianca and Irene notice April's odd behaviour and they think it has something to do with her OCD. April becomes paranoid when she learns Sid has told the police about his missing prescription pad and that he has accused his daughter, Sasha (Demi Harman), of stealing it. April's stress and anxiety levels rise when she discovers she has been awarded Dux of the school. The drug and the pressure of writing a speech get to April and she realises she can no longer cope. She confesses everything to Ruby Buckton (Rebecca Breeds), who gets rid of the drugs for her. During her speech, April passes out in front of the whole school. At the same time Heath tells Bianca that April has been self-medicating and Liam Murphy (Axle Whitehead) wrongly believes Heath was supplying the drugs to April. However, Bianca realises he has done the right thing in telling her. Gormley said "Initially [Bianca] doesn't believe it, because April isn't that kind of girl. But then she realises that she's missed something big and her sister's in trouble." Sid realises April stole his pad and has been self-medicating. He orders her to get as much rest as possible before her exams begin. Fish said the situation would have lasting consequences for April, saying "It's something that will affect her for the rest of her life, taking these drugs."

=== Heath Braxton ===
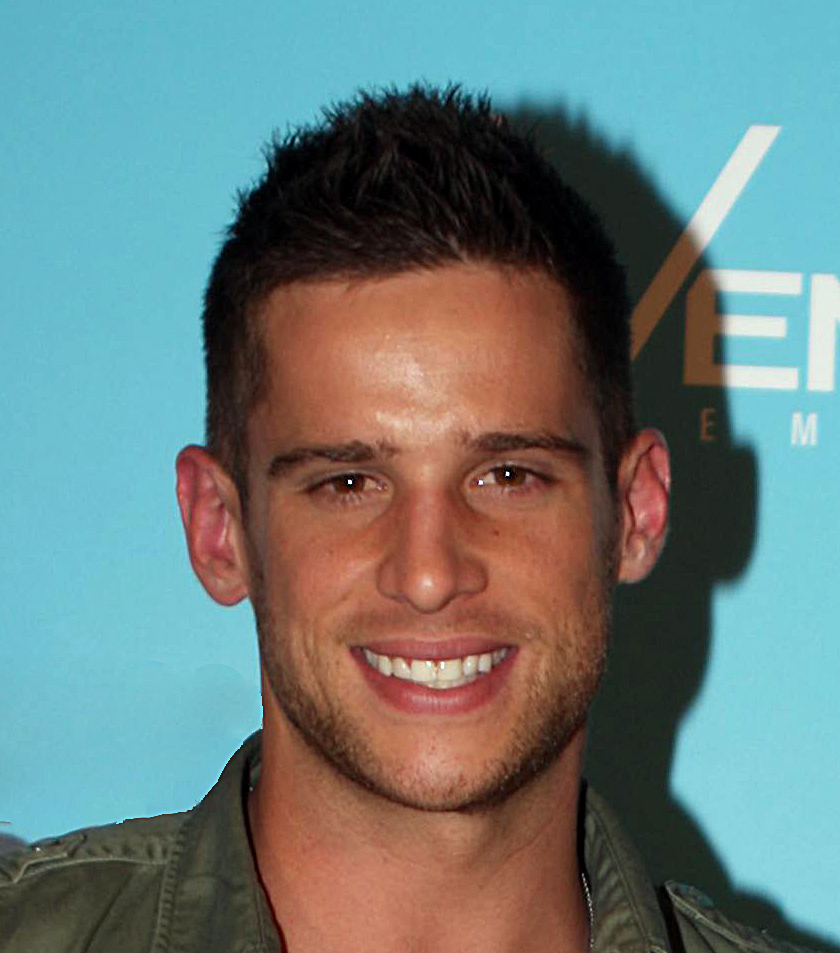
April has a one-night stand with Dan Ewing's character, Heath Braxton

Following her break up with Dex, April becomes determined to lose her virginity. After April sees Dex leaving Dallas' caravan she makes up her mind to have sex with Xavier on the evening of the school formal. Speaking to Lucy Walker of TV Week, Fish said "She sees Dex and Dallas together again and flips. She loses sense of what's right and just wants to lose her virginity. It's heartbreaking. Every time she goes to forgive Dex, Dallas turns up." Fish said April believes Dex is having sex with Dallas, but the situation is a big misunderstanding. Bianca tells her sister that having sex with Dex's best friend out of revenge is a bad idea, but April does not listen as she is on a mission. Dex and Xavier get into a fight and April leaves the formal and goes to the beach. Daniel Kilkelly of Digital Spy explained April then has a "chance meeting" with Heath Braxton and they both seek comfort in each other. April and Heath then have sex. Fish explained she was shocked when she found out about her character's new storyline, but Heath has always been there for April and he is good looking. The actress said April knows Heath is interested and she is not worried about the age difference between them. When asked if there is a future for the couple, Fish said "April would like there to be a future, but I think Heath sees this more as a one-night stand."

In January 2012, Fish revealed April would begin pursuing Heath following their one-night stand. April becomes keen to keep seeing Heath, but she is disappointed when he does not appear interested. Fish said "As soon as April sleeps with him, she can't get him out of her head. [But] he wants absolutely nothing to do with her. So it's a really hard situation she's found herself in." April then tries to attract Heath's attention at Bianca's engagement party. She gets dressed up to look "as hot as she possibly can" and tries to win him back. Because Heath is not the "sharpest tool in the shed", April's plan works and she and Heath share a steamy encounter on the beach. Bianca discovers them together and tries to stop April and Heath's relationship. Series producer, Lucy Addario told Jason Herbison of Inside Soap that there would be repercussions from April and Heath's relationship for some time to come and that it would test the strength of April and Bianca's family bond. Addario also confirmed someone from Heath's past would arrive in the Bay and viewers could expect a "juicy" love triangle.

=== Departure ===
In April 2013, Fish revealed that she would be departing Home and Away. She explained that she wanted to pursue new projects and go to Los Angeles. Fish said "It's exciting and I want to do something that makes me nervous and puts me on my toes again. I'm just so happy to have had this experience and now be going on to something different." The actress, who had yet to film her final scenes, felt upset at the thought of having to say goodbye to her co-stars and the crew. Fish later denied the report, but her co-star Teri Haddy (Rosie Prichard) confirmed to a TV Week reporter in July that Fish and Cottier would be leaving the show. Haddy commented "I think because they have both been on the show for so long, they wanted to start a brand new chapter. I want it to be a really positive ending for April and Dex, and an open-ended one."

== Storylines ==
April arrives in Summer Bay and goes to the beach. She sees Xavier Austin throwing pictures in the sea and she tells him off for harming the environment. Xavier jumps into the water and picks up all pictures and throws them in the bin. April and Xavier talk and they get on well. April starts at Summer Bay High and she befriends Ruby Buckton and Dexter Walker. April joins a boxing class run by Tony Holden (Jon Sivewright) and she recalls how she helpless she felt when she was attacked during a protest in Paris. April supports Xavier through his problems with his stepfather and they begin dating. April's half-sister, Bianca, moves to Summer Bay and they move in with Irene Roberts. April asks Gina Austin to install recycle bins at the school and she then plans to have the sale of bottled water banned. April and Xavier ask John Palmer to present their proposal to the council. April is not happy with Xavier when she discovers he has been blackmailing John. She competes with Xavier for a job at Angelo Rosetta's (Luke Jacobz) restaurant and she wins. April is upset when she learns John has pulled out of the bottled water campaign, especially as she has emailed her father about it. John changes his mind, but the campaign fails.

April worries about Bianca when she gets engaged to Prince Vittorio Seca (Richard Brancatisano), especially as Vittorio cheated on her. April believes Bianca is actually in love with Liam Murphy and she tries to push her sister and Liam together. April and Bianca's mother, Joanna, arrives for the wedding. April makes sure Liam and Bianca chaperone the Year 12 formal and she is happy when they leave together. However, Bianca announces she is still marrying Vittorio and April refuses to be a bridesmaid. April is delighted when Bianca stops the ceremony and runs off with Liam. Joanna then takes her back to Europe. April returns a few weeks later and sees Xavier kissing another girl. Xavier apologises, but April appears distant. Xavier thinks they have grown apart and he tries to finds out what is going on. April tells Xavier she is going to perform a form of environmental protest and she steals some chemicals from the school. Xavier manages to convince April that they need to get rid of the chemicals as they are dangerous. When they pour them down the sink, the chemicals react with one another and cause April and Xavier to fall unconscious.

April wakes up and drags herself from the house to look for help. Colleen Smart finds her on the beach and April is taken to the hospital. Bianca finds Xavier and he is also rushed to the hospital. His condition is more serious than April's, but he starts to recover. April apologises to everyone for taking the chemicals and she later breaks up Xavier. April begins to feel isolated at school and she has a panic attack. April helps Dex with his blog and he later notices April redoing her work over and over again. April has a breakdown and Liam and Irene become concerned about April's cleaning and tidying. Bianca thinks April may have OCD and she messes up her room and asks April to ignore it. However, April cannot and she breaks down in tears. April begins attending therapy sessions and she gets back together with Xavier. Dex confesses his feelings for her and April tells him she has feelings for him too. April breaks up with Xavier, but she does not tell him about Dex. Xavier sees April and Dex kissing and he tells them to stay away from him. Bianca is raped and April becomes angry with Liam for not being there when her sister needed him the most. April consoles her sister when she begins having nightmares and she supports Irene when she learns she has breast cancer.

When she learns about the closure of Summer Bay High, April chains herself to the gates. The police arrive and she is arrested. April finds her exam studies stressful and she is annoyed when Dex appears to be breezing through his. April meets a student who tells her about a drug that can help her study. April asks Heath Braxton if he can supply her with the drug, but Heath turns her down. April steals Sid Walker's prescription pad and gets the drugs for herself. April stays up all night after taking the drug. She starts to become paranoid when Sid reports his missing pad to the police. April is named Dux of the School and she confesses to Ruby that she took Sid's prescription pad. Ruby gets rid of the drugs for her, but during her speech, April collapses. Sid orders April to rest and he reprimands her for taking the pad. April decides to lose her virginity to Dex on the night of a schoolies party. However, she has to cancel her plans when Irene is sick. Eventually Irene recovers and April goes to the party, where she sees Dex kissing Dallas Phillips. Dex apologises to April, but she tells him their relationship is over. Dex later asks her to the formal, but April turns him down.

April tells Ruby that she plans on losing her virginity to someone at the formal and she picks Xavier. April sees Dex leaving Dallas' caravan and she assumes they are together. At the formal, Dex and Xavier learn of April's plan and Xavier tells her he would never betray his friend. April leaves the formal and goes to the beach, where she meets Heath. He offers to drive her home and April kisses him. They then have sex. April does not get the marks she needs to study medicine and decides to repeat Year 12. She pursues Heath and Bianca catches them kissing on the beach. Bianca asks April to stay away from Heath because the drama is causing stress for Irene. However, April continues her relationship with Heath in secret. April becomes jealous when Heath's ex-girlfriend, Henrietta Brown (Emma Leonard), arrives in Summer Bay. She finds out that Heath and Henri have had an affair and she breaks up with him. When Bianca learns she is pregnant with Heath's baby, she and Liam try to keep it a secret. April disapproves and tells Heath the truth, angering Bianca who tells her to stay out of her life. The sisters eventually reconcile and Bianca asks April to be her birthing partner.

April becomes jealous when Dex befriends Lottie Ryan (Morgan Weaving) and she tells him that she wants him back. Bianca gives birth to a son, but suffers a seizure and is placed in an induced coma. April turns to Dex for comfort and they get back together. When they struggle to find privacy, April and Dex decide to move in together. Dex is involved in a serious car accident and almost dies. April initially shuts everyone out as she struggles to cope with what has happened. Dex suffers a brain injury, but April vows to stand by him and moves into the Farmhouse. Irene tells April that her nephew has died and April tries to comfort both Bianca and Heath. She becomes concerned with Bianca's way of dealing with her son's death. April gets upset when Dex lies to her about having seizures, but apologises for her reaction. She later learns that she has been accepted into university.

April and Dex become engaged and April's father gets in touch and offers her a place on a medical course at a university in Paris. April tells Dex and they both agree to go and plan to hold their wedding before they leave and before Indi departs to travel around the world. They couple get married and then leave for Paris the next day, with Sid driving them and Indi to the airport.

== Reception ==
For her portrayal of April, Fish was included on the long list for the 2011 Most Popular New Talent Logie Award. Holy Soap said April's most memorable moment was "Showing her passionate nature when she reprimanded Xavier for polluting the Bay." TV Week's Carolyn Stewart branded April Home and Away's "resident greenie activist." Of April and Dex, Inside Soap's Sarah said "the relationship developing between these two kooky teenagers has my heart melting right now. Dex has struggled to fit in since arriving in Summer Bay, and April's the only person so far who really gets him." She also called their relationship "innocent and sweet."
