= List of Home and Away characters introduced in 2011 =

Home and Away is an Australian television soap opera. It was first broadcast on the Seven Network on 17 January 1988. The following is a list of characters that first appeared in 2011, by order of first appearance. All characters were introduced by the shows series producer Cameron Welsh. The 24th season of Home and Away began airing on 24 January 2011. The following month, the Braxton brothers; Darryl, Heath and Casey were introduced. Miranda Jacobs and Kieran Monroe made their debuts in April. Marty Jones made his debut in June and Tegan Callahan arrived the following month. Fletcher Humphrys joined the cast in July as Gang Member Jake Pirovic. August saw the introductions of Harvey Ryan, Hammer, Stu Henderson and Sasha Bezmel. Shane Emmett made his debut as Mark Gilmour in September and lawyer Hayley O'Connor began appearing from October.

== Darryl Braxton ==
Darryl "Brax" Braxton, played by Steve Peacocke, made his first screen appearance on 16 February 2011. The character and casting was announced on 9 January 2011. Peacocke heard about the role from his agent and he called the audition process "a lot of fun". Brax is the oldest of three brothers known as The River Boys, a "bad-boy surf gang with dodgy reputations." A writer for Channel Seven's Home and Away website stated that Brax has a "dodgy reputation and a chip on his shoulder." He is a surfing legend and commands a respect from his fellow surfies, which he finds useful. Peacocke commented that Brax just wants to escape his upbringing and have a successful family life. Brax tries to keep his younger brothers Heath (Dan Ewing) and Casey (Lincoln Younes) out of trouble. Shortly after his arrival, Darryl began a relationship with Charlie Buckton (Esther Anderson). For his portrayal of Darryl, Peacocke won the Logie Award for Most Popular New Male Talent in 2012.

== Heath Braxton ==
Heath Braxton, played by Daniel Ewing, made his first on-screen appearance on 16 February 2011, originally departed on 29 July 2014 and made a one-off appearance on 23 September 2014. Heath is the second oldest of the Braxton brothers and was initially described as being "feared by cops and the residents of his home town of Mangrove River" and having a short fuse. Heath was the first of The River Boys to be announced, with Ewing's casting revealed on 24 September 2010. Heath is Ewing's second role with Home and Away, having appeared as Reuben Humphries in 2007. For his role, Ewing had to get fit and he joked "I don't think they would cast overweight guys to play surfers, so yeah, I'm sure it was a factor for the producers." He added that he cannot surf well and was relieved that the producers did not test his surfing skills at his audition.

== Casey Braxton ==
Casey Braxton, played by Lincoln Younes, made his first on-screen appearance on 17 February 2011 and departed on 16 September 2014. Casey is the youngest of the Braxton brothers. The Daily Telegraph said that Casey is trying to break out of the River Boys mould and that he was kicked out of his last high school. Younes was planning to go to London to travel and to find himself, but after a successful audition for Home and Away, he decided to cancel his plans to play the part of Casey. He relocated to Sydney for the role. Casey is described as being a "modern day Rebel Without a Cause." He has never quite fitted in and he does not know what he wants from life. He has been overshadowed by both of his brothers and he has struggled at school. Casey later begins a relationship with Ruby Buckton (Rebecca Breeds), following her fling with Romeo Smith (Luke Mitchell).

== Miranda Jacobs ==
Miranda Jacobs
- Home and Away character
- Portrayed by: Ashley Cheadle
- First appearance: 6 April 2011
- Last appearance: 10 May 2011
- Introduced by: Cameron Welsh

Miranda Jacobs, played by Ashley Cheadle, made her first on-screen appearance on 6 April 2011. Miranda comes to Summer Bay to compete in the Surf Carnival and she begins dating Xavier Austin.

It was revealed in January 2011 that Cheadle had joined the cast of Home and Away as a love interest for one of the characters. Cheadle is a professional surfer and Tania Seager of Yahoo!7 said she is "not the standard beach blond surfer that typifies our Summer Bay culture." Cheadle's character, Miranda, competes against Ruby Buckton (Rebecca Breeds) in the Surf Carnival and Cheadle revealed that she and Breeds did their own stunts, which she said was "fun." Seager said "Miranda also sorts out the boys from the men and gives Xavier a lot to think about." Miranda briefly dates Xavier Austin (David Jones-Roberts) and she is "annoyed" when she discovers that he lied to her about being in university. Miranda gives him a second chance, but Xavier manages to "mess things up" again. Holy Soap said that it had not been confirmed how long Miranda would be in the show.

Xavier Austin delivers pizza to Miranda's house and she flirts with him. Xavier later attends a party at Miranda's home and she assumes he is a university student. They arrange to meet her again and go to a party hosted by Ruby Buckton and Casey Braxton (Lincoln Younes). When April Scott (Rhiannon Fish) is thrown into the swimming pool, Miranda and Xavier help her out and take her home. Miranda invites Xavier to an exhibition at an art gallery and they late fall asleep on the beach. Miranda tells Xavier that she will help train him for the Surf Carnival. Gina Austin (Sonia Todd) invites Miranda to give a talk at Summer Bay High and Miranda discovers Xavier is a school student. Xavier begs Miranda for a second chance, which she agrees to. She helps him out with a pizza delivery, but when she hears him lying to Angelo Rosetta (Luke Jacobz) she tells him that he needs to grow up and leaves. On the day of the Surf Carnival, Ruby Buckton goads Miranda and during the race, Ruby deliberately tries to cut Miranda off. Miranda knocks Ruby into the water and wins the race. Ruby has a go at Miranda for cheating and Xavier stands up for her.

== Kieran Monroe ==
Kieran Monroe
- Home and Away character
- Portrayed by: Andrew Hazzard
- First appearance: 6 April 2011
- Last appearance: 5 May 2011
- Introduced by: Cameron Welsh
In-universe information
- Occupation: Student

Kieran Monroe, played by Andrew Hazzard, made his first on-screen appearance on 6 April 2011. Kieran was introduced as a love interest for Indigo Walker, but his attempts to win her over make him seem "creepy".

Hazzard said joining Home and Away was "fun" and that the cast and crew had been very welcoming. Hazzard described Kieran as being a "quite a straightforward, achievement-orientated guy... in his own mind anyway." Hazzard told Holy Soap that he saw his character as wanting to succeed at his university course and his relationship with Indigo (Samara Weaving). Kieran wants to own a farm and become a great husband and father. Hazzard also felt that Kieran has been "messed around" by people. Kieran meets Indigo at a party and he falls in love with her instantly. Even though she lies to him and he does not know what is happening with their relationship, Kieran cannot stop his feelings of love for her. Kieran meets Indigo's family and Hazzard said that he "tries to be as amiable as he possibly can be. I think he feels if he makes a great impression on Indi's family, then he will have more of a chance with Indi."

Kieran also meets Indigo's ex-boyfriend, Romeo Smith (Luke Mitchell) at the party. Hazzard said that his character "definitely knows something has happened" between Indigo and Romeo and Kieran wants Romeo out of his way. When asked if Kieran is dangerous, Hazzard opined that he thinks his character has a "dangerous streak", but he did not think Kieran would hurt Indigo. The actor explained that Kieran want to be the best he can possibly be and his emotions get the better of him. On playing a bad guy, Hazzard told the website, "I didn't actually see Kieran as a 'bad guy'. Even in his final scene, where he is manhandling Indi out of the bushes and attempting to put her in his car, I feel that he was doing all of that with the best intentions. He says, 'What would your dad say if I left you out here?', and I feel that really was his motivation for wanting to get her back in his car. He really did just want to get her home safely." The actor added that Kieran could appear to come across as a bad guy from the viewer's point of view, but not from his character's. He said "He's lovesick, I think. And as we all know, sometimes love makes us do some crazy things."

Kieran meets Indigo Walker at a party and he later sends her a flirty text. Kieran asks her out and Indigo says that she will get back to him. Romeo Smith then warns Kieran to back off. Indigo accepts Kieran's invitation for a date, but when he wants to meet up again, Indigo tells him that she is busy. Kieran shows up and Indigo's house and he helps Indigo and her brother, Dexter (Charles Cottier), put together some furniture. Indigo tells Kieran that she just got out of a relationship and she is not interested in him. Kieran appears to accept this, but when Indigo goes to a club to see a band, he turns up too. Kieran offers to drive Indigo and Nicole Franklin (Tessa James) and they accept. Kieran drops Nicole off, but tries to take Indigo somewhere else. She panics and asks him to let her out of the car. Kieran does and he drives off. He later comes back to find Indigo, which scares her. He grabs her and is trying to get her into his car, when Romeo arrives. Romeo goes to fight Kieran, but Indigo tells him not to.

Erin Miller of TV Week called Kieran "freaky" and a stalker. She also said that he "kept hanging around Indi like a bad smell." Miller later said Kieran was "a rather intense suitor" and "crazed."

== Marty Jones ==
Marty Jones
- Home and Away character
- Portrayed by: Matty Lui
- First appearance: 27 June 2011
- Last appearance: 29 June 2011
- Introduced by: Cameron Welsh
In-universe information
- Occupation: Tourism manager

Marty Jones, played by Matty Lui, made his first appearance on 27 June 2011. Lui won the role of Marty after an audition in Hawaii. Lui told Yahoo!7, "My agent called me up and said that they are casting a really cool role on the most famous show in Australia and if I was up to auditioning for it, I jumped at the chance and it was awesome working with a super great cast and crew in Hawaii." Lui is a Hawaiian five time surf champion, which the writers incorporated into his character's storyline. While Lui was on the set he taught Samara Weaving to surf.

Roo Stewart (Georgie Parker), Romeo Smith (Luke Mitchell) and Indi Walker (Weaving) travel to Hawaii to attend a tourism exhibition. Marty is Roo and Romeo's business acquaintance and Indigo helps win him over. Marty later makes Indi a job offer, but Indi turns it down. Marty is happy for her and Romeo when they get married during their stay. Roo tries to distract herself from talking to Sid Walker (Robert Mammone) by spending time with Marty. When she introduces Sid to Marty, he makes Roo realise that she is actually attracted to Sid, and he encourages her to pursue a relationship with him.

== Tegan Callahan ==
Tegan Callahan
- Home and Away character
- Portrayed by: Saskia Burmeister
- First appearance: 4 July 2011
- Last appearance: 8 September 2011
- Introduced by: Cameron Welsh
In-universe information
- Mother: Connie Callahan
- Daughters: Darcy Callahan

Tegan Mary Callahan, played by Saskia Burmeister, made her first on-screen appearance on 4 July 2011. Tegan is a River Girl and Darryl Braxton's (Steve Peacocke) ex-girlfriend. She comes to Summer Bay to try and win him back. The character and casting was announced on 24 April 2011. Burmeister told The Daily Telegraph that she had an extended guest role and the door would be left open for a future return. Burmeister said she would love to come back. The actress revealed she and her husband were finalising a European holiday, just as the offer to appear in Home and Away came through. She also revealed that she bleached her usual brown hair blonde for the role. Burmeister's younger sister, Martika Sullivan, who played Kelly O'Mara also landed a role in the show at the same time.

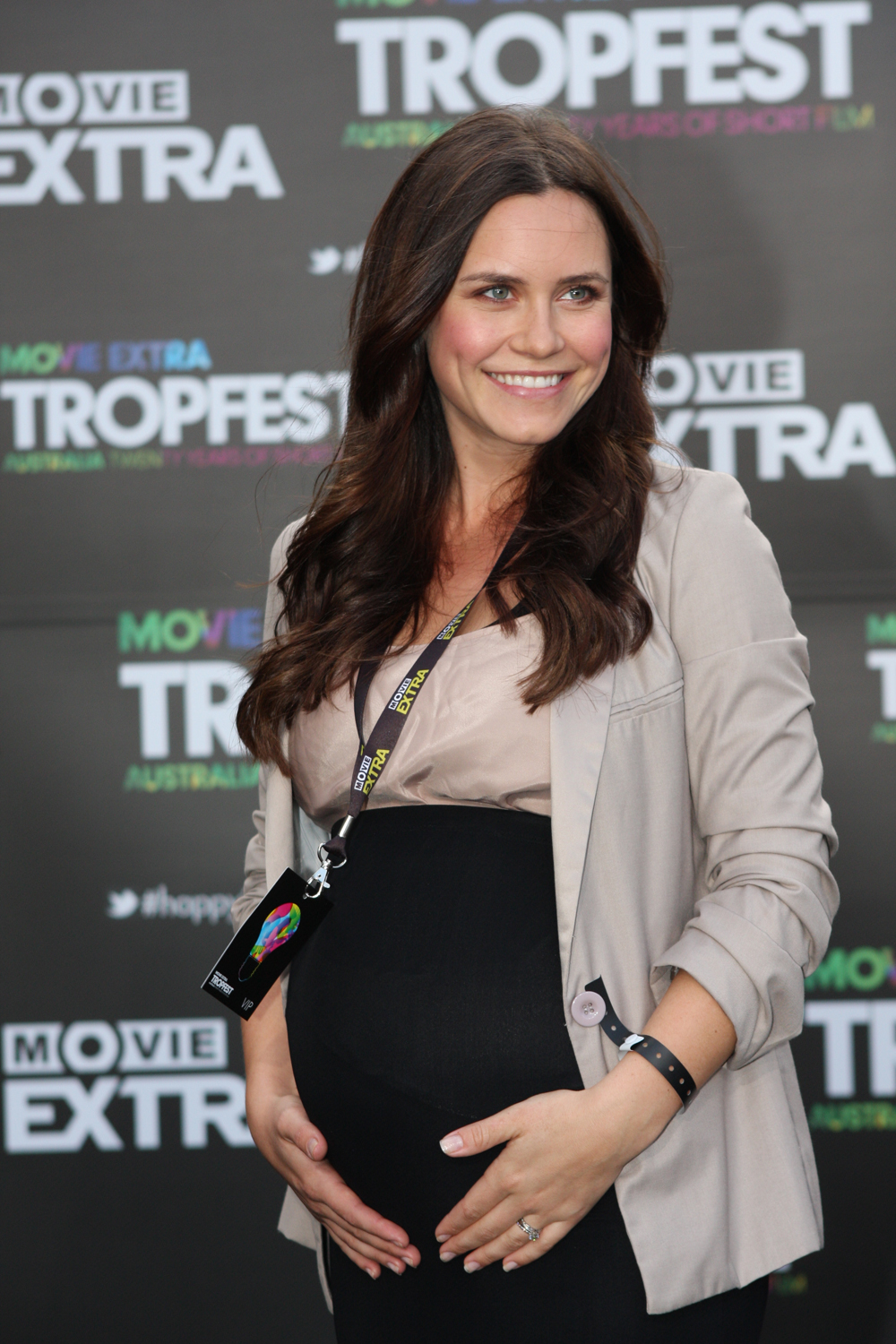
Saskia Burmeister played Tegan Callahan

Burmeister described Tegan as a bitch and a "naughty character", which she said attracted her to the role. Burmeister is often cast as the girl next door and she relished the chance to play Tegan. She said "I love her. I find myself gasping at what she is doing." The actress added "She's really nasty, dark and menacing and likes to cause trouble." Lizzy Lovette of The Sun-Herald said Tegan is a "manipulative surfer chick", who arrives in the Bay to ruffle some feathers. Peacocke revealed that Tegan comes to town to do his mother's bidding. He told TV Week, "Brax has been butting heads with his mum, Cheryl (Suzi Dougherty), so she decides to contact Tegan to suss out what's going on with [him]." Peacocke explained that Darryl has a soft spot for Tegan because they share a history, but he does not trust her and she is not the type of person he can confide in. Tegan is shocked to learn that Darryl is in a relationship with Charlie Buckton (Esther Anderson). The Daily Star Sunday reported that Tegan will stop at nothing to split Darryl and Charlie up. Darryl wants nothing to do with Tegan and he orders her to leave town after she threatens Charlie. An insider told the paper: "She's devastated when he tells her to leave. But there really is nothing worse than a woman scorned." The Daily Record said Tegan was "certainly a firebrand."

Tegan comes to Angelo's to see Darryl Braxton, after talking to his mother, Cheryl. Tegan asks him about his new girlfriend, but Darryl refuses to give her any details, so she cannot report back to his mother. Tegan tells Heath Braxton (Daniel Ewing) that Darryl has changed and when he mentions that Darryl owns Angelo's, Tegan goes to see Colleen Smart (Lyn Collingwood). Colleen tells Tegan all about the River Boys and Darryl's arrival in Summer Bay. Tegan later spots Darryl with Charlie Buckton. She confronts Charlie, telling her that she knows about her relationship with Darryl and that their secret is not safe with her. Darryl later tells Tegan to leave. Tegan returns and reveals to Darryl that she is dating Jake Pirovic (Fletcher Humphrys). She tells him that Jake knows about Heath's plan to launch a raid on his land and tells Darryl to stop Heath before he gets killed. Tegan later turns up with bags of drugs and Heath helps her hide them. Tegan goes to see Darryl and she kisses him. They have sex and Charlie finds them together. Jake stabs Darryl and Tegan helps him with his injury. She later reveals to Charlie that Darryl is Darcy's father. Tegan tells Darryl and he initially asks for a DNA test, but changes his mind. Casey (Lincoln Younes) overhears Tegan and Cheryl talking and learns Tegan is lying to Darryl. Casey tells Darryl, who confronts Tegan and she reveals Heath is Darcy's real father. Tegan decides to go back to Jake. A storm hits the Bay and Heath takes Darcy to the high school. Tegan arrives and tells Heath he had no right taking Darcy and they leave. Tegan crashes her car and Charlie arrives to help her. Tegan panics when she realises Darcy is missing, but Darryl finds her. Tegan tells Charlie she loves Darryl, but he does not love her. Tegan is pulled out of the car and taken to hospital. She reveals to Darryl that she told Hammer (Benedict Samuel) about him and Charlie. Tegan goes into surgery, but she dies from her injuries.

== Harvey Ryan ==
Harvey Ryan
- Home and Away character
- Portrayed by: Marcus Graham
- Duration: 2011–14
- First appearance: 10 August 2011
- Last appearance: 27 February 2014
- Introduced by: Cameron Welsh
In-universe information
- Occupation: Fishing charterer Councillor; Bait shop worker
- Wife: Melissa Gregg (until 2010); Roo Stewart (2012–14)
- Sons: Ben Ryan
- Daughters: Lottie Ryan

Harvey Ryan, played by Marcus Graham, made his first on screen appearance on 10 August 2011. The character and casting was announced on 31 July 2011. Graham was originally supposed to have a small guest role, but he asked the producers if he could stay and was contracted until the end of 2012. Of this, Graham told the Herald Sun, "I came in for a couple of episodes and it was just a really, really great experience ... I've worked with Georgie (Parker) before in theatre and we started in the business around the same time and get along very well so I thought, why not?"

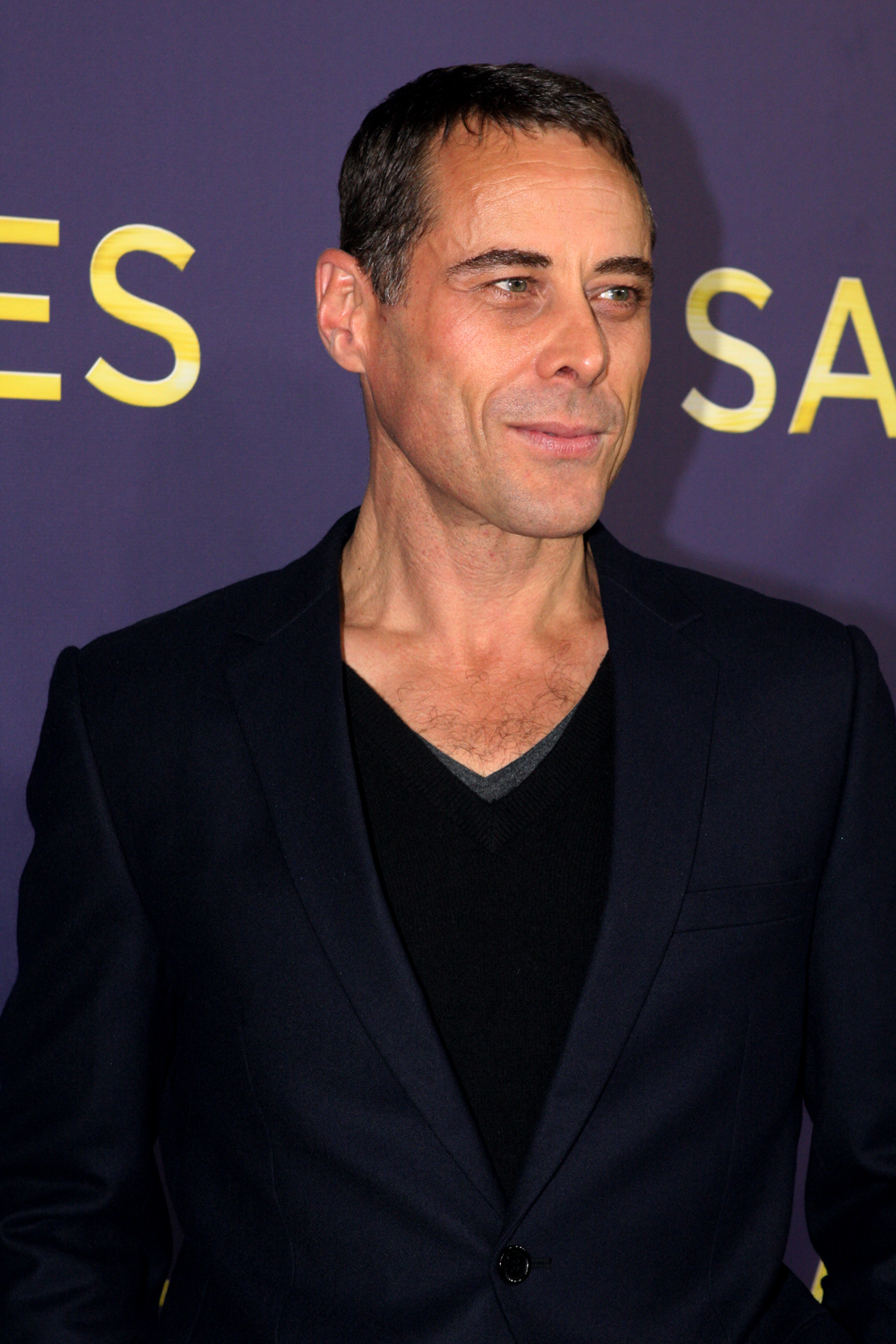
Marcus Graham portrays Harvey

Harvey Ryan is described as being the "expert on all things sailing and boating in Summer Bay." He was brought up in Summer Bay and runs a local fishing charter. Of Harvey, the official Home and Away website explained, "Harvey is a big fish in a small pond and more than capable of winning a woman over with his smile, his easy charm and his blokey boatie ways." However, Harvey is capable of making enemies and he gets on the wrong side of many locals, including Romeo Smith (Luke Mitchell), who becomes convinced Harvey trashed his boat to ruin his business. Romeo finds out Harvey has been stealing his clients and copying his ideas, and when his boat is vandalised, Romeo decides to report him to the police. The official website said "The gloves are off and both men settle in for a war." Romeo later apologises to Harvey, but Harvey is not interested and he complains to the council about Romeo and Alf Stewart (Ray Meagher) not having a permit for their mooring.

On 4 July 2013, it was revealed Graham had finished filming on Home and Away. Following his on-screen departure, Graham explained that it was agreed all round "that it was time to finish Harvey" and he called his exit "harmonious". Graham admitted to staying with the show longer than he originally planned, as he was enjoying the work. He added that he would not rule out a return to Home and Away in the future.

When Romeo Smith's boat is trashed, he believes Harvey is behind it. He also learns Harvey has stolen some of his clients and has obviously copied his business ideas. Romeo reports Harvey to the police, but Elijah Johnson (Jay Laga'aia) clears Harvey of the crime when he finds the real culprit. Romeo apologises, but Harvey informs him that he has just complained to the council about Romeo's lack of permit for his mooring. Romeo and his partner, Alf, are forced to move their boat, when the council tell them in legal terms, their mooring did not officially exist. Harvey tells Romeo that he is next in line to take over the mooring. However, when he checks it out, he finds it gone. Harvey later confronts Romeo with a story about Alf and the mooring in the paper. Roo Stewart (Georgie Parker) invites three investors to look at the new resort site. Due to an impending storm, Alf stops Romeo from using the Blaxland, but Harvey agrees to take them all out in his boat in the hope of winning the marina contract. The bad weather causes Harvey's boat to sink and Romeo and Alf are forced to save Roo, Harvey and the investors. Romeo finds Harvey, who is injured and manages to get him to the hospital. Harvey asks Alf if they could go into business together as he has the mooring and Alf has the boat. Alf persuades Romeo to agree to the deal. Harvey and Roo go on a date, but Roo leaves early. Harvey asks her out again and they go out to dinner. Romeo gets fed up of Harvey neglecting his jobs and confronts him. Harvey tells Romeo he will pull his weight, but he later tells Alf that Romeo skipped his chores.

Romeo believes Harvey is trying to get the marina contract behind his back when Harvey reveals he is thinking about getting his own boat. Roo begins avoiding Harvey and he thinks she is still in love with Sid Walker (Robert Mammone). However, Roo denies this and kisses Harvey. Harvey empties a can of petrol on the Blaxland and blames Romeo for it in front of Alf. Harvey later offers to buy the Blaxland from Alf. Roo confronts Harvey about using her to get the Blaxland and she breaks up with him. Harvey and Roo realise that they still have feelings for each other and get back together. Harvey runs for a position on the council against Alf and wins. He shuts down the proposed resort and John Palmer (Shane Withington) starts to suspect him of being corrupt. Roo and Harvey briefly break up again, but reconcile. Harvey's ex-wife Melissa (Allison Cratchley) arrives in the Bay with their daughter, Lottie (Morgan Weaving). Harvey contracts food poisoning and while he is in the hospital, Mel visits him and asks to stay at his house. When Harvey is reunited with Lottie, she gives him a cold reception due to his absence. Harvey then tells Roo about Mel and Lottie and she initially gives him the silent treatment as he did not tell her straight away. A week later Roo tells him that she wants to meet Lottie and they go on a picnic. John comes to Harvey and Roo with questions about a newly proposed Eco Park and warns them that he is going to the council. Harvey is later seen arguing with the mayor.

John tells the press that Harvey rigged the council elections and Harvey resigns from the council. He is also punched by a member of the public and Mel treats him. She admits that she is still struggling to deal with their young son, Ben's death. Harvey admits that he was aware of the Mayor's vote rigging scam and has to go to court. Roo convinces him to let her aunt, Morag (Cornelia Frances), represent him and when he pleads guilty, he is given community service and a fine. Harvey then realises he has to sell his house to pay the fine. Harvey and Lottie move into Summer Bay House with Roo, while Mel goes to a clinic in the city to help her deal with Ben's death. When Harvey returns from visiting her, he reveals that she wants Lottie to join her in the city. He breaks the news to Lottie and she decides that she wants to stay in the Bay. Mel does not take the news well and she and Harvey begin a custody battle. Mel threatens to reveal that Harvey was drunk when Ben fell off their boat and died, so Harvey tells Lottie and Roo himself. Lottie eventually decides that Mel needs her and they leave. Harvey proposes to Roo and she accepts. Roo's ex-boyfriend Tim Graham (Jonny Pasvolsky) arrives in Summer Bay intending to get Roo back. Tim and Roo share a kiss, causing Harvey to fight with Tim. When Harvey thinks that Roo has chosen Tim, he goes to the city to see Lottie and ends up having a one-night stand with Mel. Roo later finds out and the pair fight, but they eventually reconcile. Harvey and Roo begin planning their wedding and Roo invites Winston Markman (John Batchelor) to be Harvey's best man. They later marry and run the caravan park together. When teenage runaways Maddy Osborne (Kassandra Clementi) and Spencer Harrington (Andrew Morley) rent a caravan from Harvey and Roo, they become like parents to the two children and they eventually move into Summer Bay House with them.

When Winston returns to the Bay, Harvey makes plans with his best friend to go on a fishing trip with him away from the area. However, Roo receives news that Harvey and Winston's boat is missing, and, although Winston is found quickly, Harvey vanishes for several months. He returns abruptly without explanation of where he has been, but is obviously scarred by the experience. He finds Summer Bay claustrophobic and realising that things have changed between him and Roo, they decide to get a divorce so Harvey can leave. Spencer takes the news that Harvey is leaving badly but they reconcile before Harvey leaves.

== Jake Pirovic ==
Jake Pirovic
- Home and Away character
- Portrayed by: Fletcher Humphrys
- Duration: 2011–2012, 2014
- First appearance: 22 July 2011
- Last appearance: 6 October 2014
- Introduced by: Cameron Welsh (2011); Lucy Addario (2014)
In-universe information
- Occupation: Career criminal
- Brothers: Hammer Pirovic

Jake Pirovic, played by Fletcher Humphrys, made his first screen appearance on 22 July 2011 and departed on 23 January 2012. In 2014, Humphrys reprised his role as Jake and returned to the serial. Humphrys' co-star Tai Hara, who plays Andy Barrett, spoke to TV Week about Andy's involvement with Jake: "He's on a one-way train that's going nowhere but off the tracks. It's relentless in terms of the number of stuff-ups he's making. Andy has lied to so many people. Everyone has turned their back on him. He's at his lowest point and thinks he can't possibly make any more bad decisions. Jake's older and Andy thinks he's a shady person. But Jake also gives Andy a sense of validation. It makes him feel better." It was revealed that Jake's return storyline would culminate in a murder.

Jake is the leader of a rival surf gang to the River Boys. He dates Tegan Callahan (Saskia Burmeister). Jake is arrested alongside Heath Braxton (Dan Ewing), when Heath attempts to raid the rival gang's drug crop but Pirovic is later released. He demands his drugs back from Heath's brother Darryl (Steve Peacocke) and kidnaps their younger brother Casey (Lincoln Younes) and Ruby Buckton (Rebecca Breeds). Brax returns the drugs to Jake in exchange for Casey and Ruby, but when he realises some are missing, he stabs Brax. Jake is later arrested and sent to jail. While inside prison, Jake's brother Hammer (Benedict Samuel) takes over the lead of his crew but is later shot dead by Charlie Buckton after a failed kidnap attempt. Upon his release, he goes to Charlie Buckton's (Esther Anderson) home and shoots her twice killing her in revenge for killing his brother. Jake waits for Brax at his house and the pair fight before Jake takes off in his car, closely followed by Brax. They fight again on the beach and Jake is caught by the police. He confesses to shooting Charlie and is re-sentenced.

Two years later, Jake is revealed to be the leader of a drug dealing gang that Andy Barrett owes money to. He has three members of his gang including his second, Cody Dalton (Aaron Glenane) to attack Casey and Denny Miller (Home and Away) (Jessica Grace Smith) and kidnap Josh and Evie MacGuire (Philippa Northeast). to make sure Andy pays up. Jake tells Andy about Charlie killing Hammer and blames Brax for his brother's death as well. After Josh wants nothing to do with Andy following the kidnap ordeal, Jake uses it to his advantage and tries to convince Andy that he can stop Brax before his brother gets killed. Andy initially agrees to help Jake but then realises that Jake is planning to kill Brax. When Andy refuses to help Jake anymore with his plan to try to get Brax's attention, Jake kidnaps Josh as leverage. Andy and Casey meet up with Jake to try and rescue Josh and Casey hits Jake with a stick allowing Andy to run off. Brax and his brother Kyle (Nic Westaway) arrive to assist Casey, but Jake ends up shooting Casey from outside the barn whilst aiming for Brax. Casey then dies of his injuries.

Andy later calls Jake and tells him to leave Brax alone because he is already suffering due to Casey's death, but an unrepentant Jake tells him that he is not finished with Brax. Brax then goes looking for Jake to avenge Casey. Brax and Andy hide out at the murder scene where they believe Jake will return to inspect the sight. After spotting tyre tracks on the dirt road he quickly speeds off with Brax & Andy in pursuit. Brax and Jake attempt to run each other off the road when Jake quickly manages to lose the pair but is then cornered on a dead end road, Brax hurtles the car causing it to crash into Jake's vehicle knocking him off the road and seriously injuring him. Brax proceeds to confront the already injured Pirovic one last time but his car explodes. Jake is hospitalised and is put into a medically induced coma on life support. Senior Sergeant Mike Emerson (Cameron Stewart) reveals that Jake was transferred from prison to a low-security facility, as he was deemed not responsible for his actions when shooting Charlie two years ago, under a psychiatric order and had been held there for the past year and ended up escaping.

Brax tells doctor Nate Cooper (Kyle Pryor) to let Jake die but when he refuses Brax tries one last attempt to kill Pirovic by disconnecting his life support machine, but he is arrested by the police before he can do so. Andy then after hours sneaks into the hospital and disconnects Jake's life support machine, causing him to die as a result.

== Hammer ==
Hammer
- Home and Away character
- Portrayed by: Benedict Samuel
- First appearance: 22 August 2011
- Last appearance: 19 September 2011
- Introduced by: Cameron Welsh
In-universe information
- Brothers: Jake Pirovic

Harman "Hammer" Pirovic, played by Benedict Samuel, made his first appearance on 22 August 2011. The character and casting was announced on 30 July 2011. Hammer is a member of a gang rivalling the River Boys. His real name is Harman and Samuel told the Herald Sun that he comes to uphold his honour and stir things up in Summer Bay. He added "I'm hired muscle, which is kind of ironic since I'm the skinniest person you've ever met. There's a lot of pursed lips and steely looks." The Advertiser described Hammer as a "big, hard guy with a lot of attitude" who plays second fiddle to his brother.

Hammer is a member of his brother Jake's (Fletcher Humphrys) gang. While Jake is in prison, Hammer becomes the leader of the gang. He gives Darryl "Brax" Braxton (Steve Peacocke) a warning and when he learns Heath Braxton (Daniel Ewing) turned witness on Jake for an early release from jail, he threatens the brothers. Hammer and his gang beat Heath up. Heath and some members of the River Boys, retaliate by smashing up Hammer's car. Hammer and his gang set fire to Heath's car and the gangs face off on the beach. They are broken up by the police, but Hammer's gang get a hold of Stu Henderson (Brenton Thwaites) and remove his tattoo. They dump him outside of Brax and Heath's house. Charlie Buckton (Esther Anderson) and her colleague Georgina Watson (Jacklyn Albergoni) stop Hammer for speeding and they find a large piece of wood. Georgina stays with him to search the rest of his ute, while Charlie goes to stop a brawl between the gangs. Hammer goes to the hospital when he learns Jake's girlfriend, Tegan Callahan (Saskia Burmeister) died. He warns Brax that the next time they meet, both he and Charlie will be dead. Hammer later tells Brax that Jake wants to see him suffer, so he and his gang are going to go after Charlie. Someone then shoots Charlie from Hammer's car. One of Charlie's colleagues reveals Hammer was at the station reporting his stolen car when she was shot. Charlie decides to bring in Hammer, but he reveals nothing about the shooting. Hammer attends Tegan's funeral and then confronts Brax, demanding he gives up his territory. Hammer kidnaps Charlie and tells Brax to come and save her. When Brax arrives, Hammer reneges on his deal and reveals he intends to kill them both. He prepares to shoot Brax, but Charlie attacks and disarms him, causing a brief fight to breaks out. Hammer attempts to shoot Brax with a second gun, but Charlie takes Hammer's first gun and uses it to shoot Hammer dead.

== Stu Henderson ==
Stu Henderson
- Home and Away character
- Portrayed by: Brenton Thwaites
- Duration: 2011–12
- First appearance: 23 August 2011
- Last appearance: 5 March 2012
- Introduced by: Cameron Welsh
In-universe information
- Occupation: Student
- Father: Alan Henderson
- Mother: Margaret Henderson

Stuart "Stu" Henderson, played by Brenton Thwaites, made his first appearance on 23 August 2011. Shortly after Thwaites relocated to Sydney from Cairns in April 2011, he was given the five-month recurring role of Stu on Home and Away. He called the show a great learning experience and said his co-stars were easy to work with. Tristan Swanwick of The Courier-Mail said Thwaites' character is part of a major storyline, which lasts for the rest of the year.

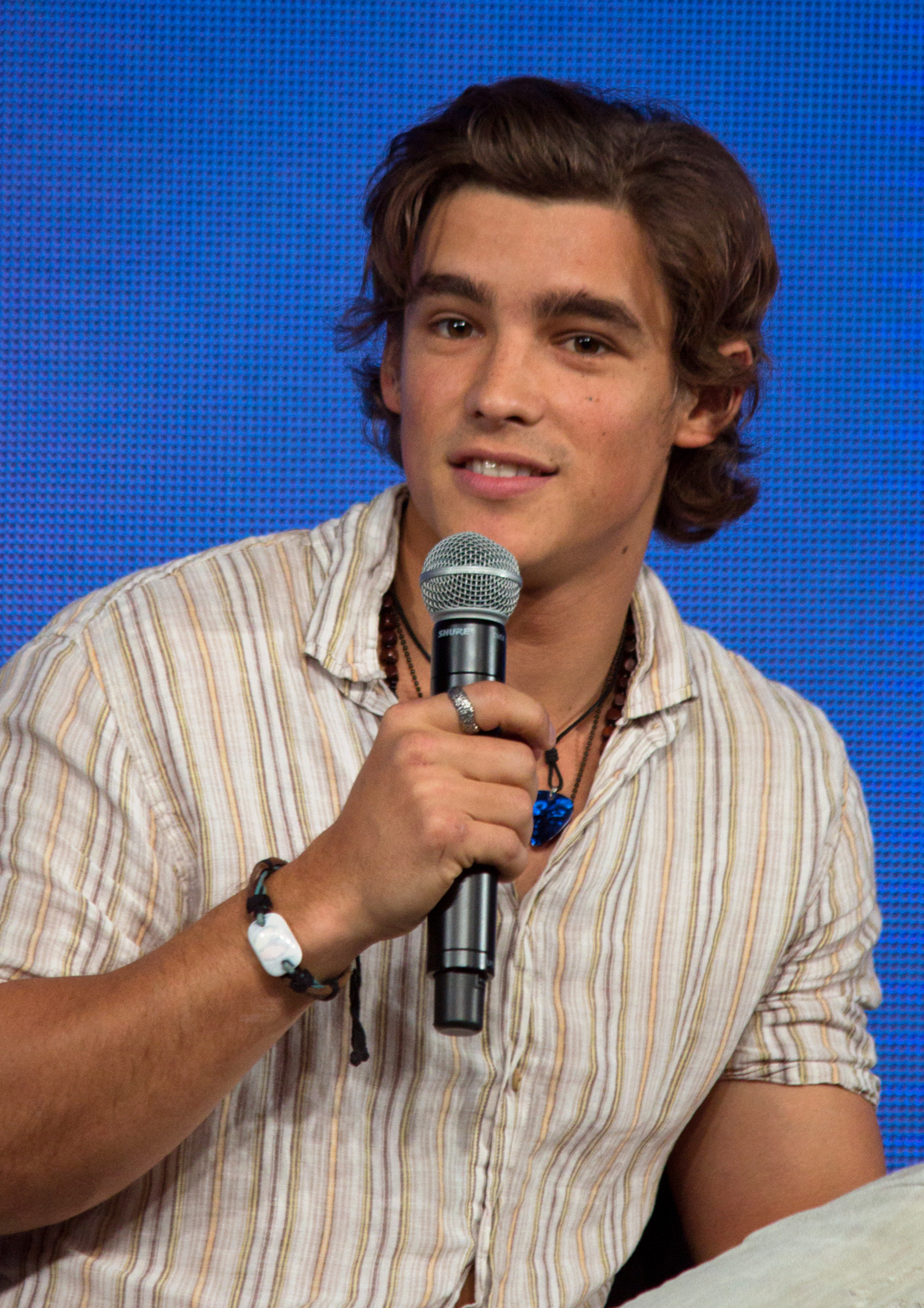
Brenton Thwaites played Stuart Henderson.

Stu is a new member of the Bay's River Boys. The Gold Coast Mail called him "another pot-stirring River Boy who comes in to 'rock The Bay'." Swanwick said Thwaites was too a "bit too pretty to be a bad-ass River Boy", but a few fake tattoos would fix that. Of his character, Thwaites told The Courier-Mail, "Stu's awesome, he has some fights, he gets the girls, it's awesome fun." Thwaites also told The Cairns Post that Stu would come in and steal the heart of a "beautiful young lady." The River Boys rival's are Hammer's (Benedict Samuel) gang. Hammer targets Stu as he is new and he gets his "Blood & Sand" tattoo sliced off his arm. Steve Peacocke (who plays Darryl Braxton) said "They chose the youngest and freshest face to send out a warning, and that's just fuel for the fire." The attack on Stu, prompts a brawl between the River Boys and Hammer's gang. In February 2012, it was announced Stu's lifeless body would be found in the caravan park by Alf Stewart (Ray Meagher). Robert Mammone who plays Sid Walker, told a columnist for All About Soap that the investigation into Stu's death is "very thorough and you never know what they may find". Mammone added that there would be a high amount of questioning and "several bay residents will becomes suspects".

Stu becomes a member of The River Boys and is excited to show off his new tattoo at school. Stu and Heath Braxton (Daniel Ewing) come across Hammer's (Benedict Samuel) car and trash it, which sparks a gang war. The two gangs face off on the beach, but are broken up by the police. Shortly after, Hammer's gang get a hold of Stu and remove his tattoo. They dump him outside of Darryl (Steve Peacocke) and Heath's house. Stu goes to the hospital and has surgery on his arm. Stu meets Sasha Bezmel (Demi Harman) and they spend the day together. Sid does not approve of Stu and warns him to stay away from his daughter. Sid later relents and allows Stu to date Sasha. Stu asks Sasha for a sexy picture and she sends him a topless photo of herself. Stu later tells Sasha he loves her. Stu confronts Sasha when she does not reply to his texts. She tells him she did not have any credit, but Stu becomes angry and thinking she may have moved on, he slaps her. Stu apologises and presents Sasha with a ring. Stu draws a picture for Sasha and she later reveals she got it tattooed on her stomach. Stu becomes angry at what she has done and slaps her across the face. Stu apologies and Sasha forgives him. Stu slaps Sasha again when he learns she received a text from another boy. Sasha screams at Stu to leave and later breaks up with him. Stu steals Xavier Austin's (David Jones-Roberts) car and insists Sasha gets in, she does and he begs her to give him another chance. Sasha agrees and accepts her ring back. Sasha ends up in hospital after her tattoo becomes infected. Sid assumes Stu talked Sasha into getting the tattoo and Sasha begins avoiding Stu and his calls. Stu asks Sasha to the Year 12 formal, but she turns him down. Stu spots Sasha at the formal and he starts harassing her. When she yells at him, he hits her. Sid witnesses this and proceeds to violently bash Stu, hospitalising him. Stu is later charged with assault. He meets with Sasha to discuss their fathers' behaviour. Stu's father, Alan (Peter Phelps), catches them together and drags Stu away. Stu later reveals to Sasha that Alan hit him and he has decided to leave. Alf finds Stu's body near the caravan park. Following a police investigation, Sasha confesses to killing Stu in self-defence. Sasha refused to go with Stu and attempted to escape. Stu chased her and hit her again in a rage, but it provoked Sasha into finally fighting back against Stu and pushing him away, but in the process, he hit his head on a rock, dying instantly on impact. It is revealed that Dennis Harling (Daniel Roberts) moved Stu's body from the scene and dumped him at the park. Sasha is subsequently found not guilty.

== Sasha Bezmel ==
Sasha Bezmel, played by Demi Harman, made her first on screen appearance on 31 August 2011. Isabelle Cornish initially auditioned for the role of Sasha, however Harman was eventually cast. The actress relocated from Brisbane to Sydney for the part, which she said was a dream come true. Sasha is Sid Walker's (Robert Mammone) fifteen-year-old, illegitimate daughter. When Sasha's mother is killed in a car accident, Sasha is forced to move to Summer Bay to be with her father and half-siblings. Of her character Harman said "I just fell in love with her. Sasha is sassy, angry, stubborn and has a rebellious streak." A writer for the official show website explained "Though she's happy to meet with other half-siblings, in Dex and Indi, she is uncontrollable, naughty and independent." The writer added that Sasha is at an age where girls want to go "wild and ruin their future." For her portrayal of Sasha, Harman was nominated in the category of "Most Popular New Female Talent" at the 2012 Logie Awards.

== Mark Gilmour ==
Mark Gilmour
- Home and Away character
- Portrayed by: Shane Emmett
- First appearance: 22 September 2011
- Last appearance: 13 October 2011
- Introduced by: Cameron Welsh

Mark Gilmour, played by Shane Emmett, made his first on screen appearance on 22 September 2011. Emmett had an extended guest turn on the show. The actor is the brother of late Home and Away actress Belinda Emmett (who played Rebecca Fisher) and he told The Daily Telegraph, "Of all the gigs, I knew it would be difficult because Belinda spent so much of her professional time there. And there are a lot of the characters Belinda used to work with still there, so I found myself surrounded by her." Mark is the wealthy boyfriend of Gypsy Nash (Kimberley Cooper). He and Gypsy's daughter, Lily Smith (Charlie Rose Maclennan), do not get on well as she is not ready for a new man in her and her mother's life.

Mark comes to visit Gypsy in Summer Bay and he clashes with her daughter Lily. Mark suggests sending Lily to boarding school, but Gypsy disagrees with the idea. Gypsy cooks dinner for Mark, but their evening is ruined when Lily reveals that Gypsy had a one-night stand with Liam Murphy (Axle Whitehead). Angered, Mark confronts Liam at Angelo's. Gypsy then breaks up with Mark.

== Hayley O'Connor ==
Hayley O'Connor
- Home and Away character
- Portrayed by: Alyssa McClelland
- Duration: 2011–2012
- First appearance: 10 October 2011
- Last appearance: 22 June 2012
- Introduced by: Cameron Welsh
In-universe information
- Occupation: Lawyer

Hayley O'Connor, played by Alyssa McClelland, made her first on screen appearance on 10 October 2011. McClelland previously appeared in Home and Away as Brooke MacPherson.

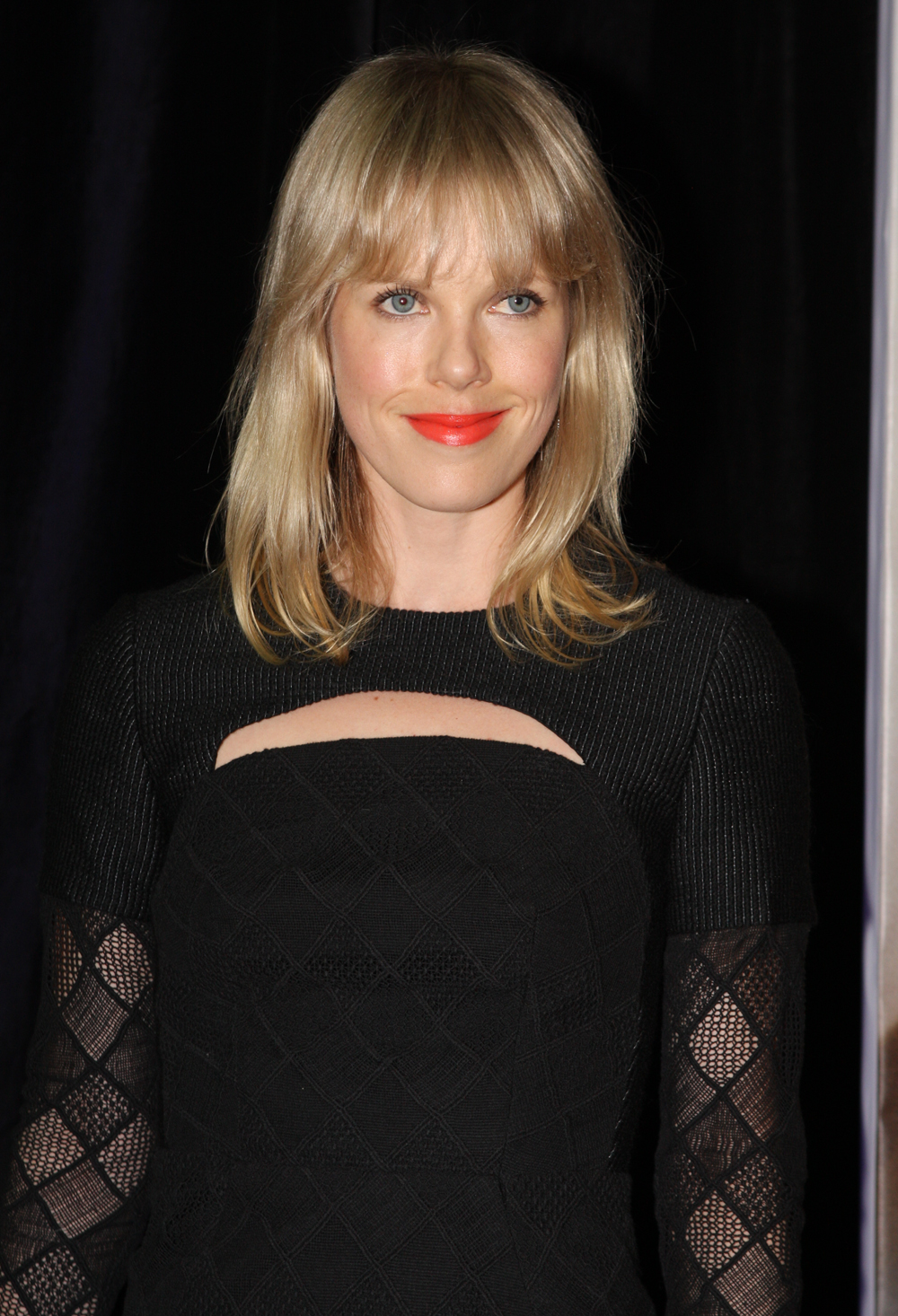
Alyssa McClelland played Hayley O'Connor

Hayley is Casey Braxton's (Lincoln Younes) lawyer and she comforts his older brother, Darryl "Brax" (Steve Peacocke), when he is sent to jail. Of Hayley and Darryl, Peacocke said "Hayley is quite cunning, because she knows he's in a bad place. She sees the opportunity to go in when he's at his low point." Darryl's on-off girlfriend, Charlie Buckton (Esther Anderson), later sees the pair kissing and believes Darryl has moved on. Peacocke also confirmed there would be an "air of intrigue surrounding Hayley and her intentions", adding there will be a mystery as to why Hayley is in Summer Bay. Charlie becomes jealous when she sees Darryl giving Hayley a surfing lesson. The official Home and Away website said McClelland had to brave the elements "in a bikini on a freezing cold windy day at Palm Beach." McClelland returned to Home and Away as Hayley on 30 April 2012.

Hayley defends Casey Braxton in court, following his charge of arson. Hayley outs Charlie Buckton's relationship with Casey's brother, Brax. Despite her efforts, Casey is found guilty and sent to Juvenile Detention. The next day, Charlie runs into Hayley, who gives her the impression she is dating Brax. Later that evening, Hayley kisses Brax before they go out to dinner. Brax gives Hayley a surfing lesson on the beach. Charlie calls round to Brax's house and she finds Hayley there. Hayley then spends the night with Brax. When Brax is taken in for questioning about a robbery, he uses Hayley as his alibi. However, Hayley denies being with Brax and she tells him about her false statement just before she leaves town. Hayley returns to Summer Bay after Heath Braxton (Dan Ewing) hires her to help him stop Bianca Scott (Lisa Gormley) leaving town with his child. Hayley runs into Brax and he takes her to the edge of a cliff, where he confronts her about Charlie's death. Hayley confesses that she set him up and helped get Jake Pirovic (Fletcher Humphrys) released from prison because she had a drug problem. Brax tells her that he holds her responsible for Charlie's death and eventually lets her go.

== Others ==
Date(s)	Character	Actor	Circumstances
24 January – 5 October	Judge/Magistrate Hanson	Rhett Walton	A Judge at Alf Stewart's (Ray Meagher) court hearing. As Magistrate Hanson, he presides over the trial of Casey Braxton (Lincoln Younes) and sentences him to thirty days in juvenile detention.
24 January	Clerk	Anthony Milne	A clerk that appears at Alf Stewart's (Ray Meagher) court hearing.
27 January – 21 November	Summer Horgan-Jones	Jaimee Taylor-Nielsen	Summer is a new student at Summer Bay High who befriends Ruby Buckton (Rebecca Breeds), Romeo Smith (Luke Mitchell) and Xavier Austin (David Jones-Roberts). Summer takes a liking to Xavier and kisses him, not knowing Xavier's girlfriend April Scott (Rhiannon Fish) is looking on. Summer attends a party and gets drunk. Dexter Walker (Charles Cottier) looks after her. April and Xavier set Summer up with Dexter and they all go on a double date. Summer leaves early after realising that Dexter likes April. Summer runs into Xavier and she tells him that she is going to a party. She manages to persuade Xavier to end his work shift and come with her. On their way to the party, Xavier crashes his bike and Summer is left with a broken arm and concussion. Summer flirts with Casey Braxton (Lincoln Younes) at a party and he kisses her to make Ruby jealous.
27–25 January 2012	Jase McKenzie	Nick Bartlett	Jase is a bully who picks on VJ Patterson (Felix Dean). Dexter Walker (Charles Cottier) tries to protect him, Jase brawls with him, punching Dexter in the face. He later causes April Scott (Rhiannon Fish) to break down. Jase later laughs at Irene Roberts (Lynne McGranger), when she drops hot drinks over the Diner floor. When Stu Henderson (Brenton Thwaites) sends a naked photograph of Sasha Bezmel (Demi Harman) to all his friends, Jase mocks Sasha in the Diner. Xavier Austin (David Jones-Roberts) snatches his phone and throws it in his bowl of soup to silence him.
31 January, 5 October–19 November 2013, 19 May 2014, 17 March 2015 – 5 May 2016	Constable Nader/Neal Stevenson	Michele-Antonio Mattiuzzi	Constable Nader brings the real Shandi Palmer into the police station for questioning. As Neal Stevenson he deals with a noise complaint at the Braxton household. Then he investigates a robbery at a petrol station alongside Charlie Buckton (Esther Anderson). He releases Dennis Harling (Daniel Roberts) on bail for moving Stu Henderson's (Brenton Thwaites) body and orders him to keep away from the resort. Neal later reprimands Heath Braxton (Dan Ewing) for not returning his daughter Darcy Callahan (Alea O'shea) to her grandmother on time.
31 January–1 February, 18 August–7 October 2014	Shandi Ayres	Elizabeth Blackmore (2011); Tess Haubrich (2014)	Shandi is John Palmer's (Shane Withington) daughter. She is brought to the police station where it is revealed that her identity was stolen by her friend, Daria Hennessy (Samantha Tolj). She later goes to meet John for the first time, but decides not to stay in touch with him. Three years later, Shandi returns for John's wedding to Marilyn Chambers.
1 February	Park Worker	Peter Cridland	Angelo Rosetta (Luke Jacobz) bribes the man with money, in return he sends Daria (Samantha Tolj) to him.
1 February	Lifesaver	Christian Miranda	A life guard working on the beach with John.
2 February	René Lisle	Akos Armont	René is the French friend of April Scott (Rhiannon Fish), she talks to him online for a while, when appears on her webcam.
9 February	Stephanie	Jacinta Acevski	Stephanie is a tour guide at Open week. She tries to reassure Nicole Franklin (Tessa James) that there are many pregnant students at the university.
9 February	Simone Bollen	Angela Bauer	Simone is a lecturer at the university. Nicole Franklin (Tessa James) approaches her about doing a second year course, she tells her she will not be able to cope with this whilst pregnant.
9 February	Evan	Ryan Oliver Gelbart	Evan meets Nicole Franklin (Tessa James) at a toga party at university. He likes her and they spend the day together. They kiss, Nicole informs him she is pregnant. He tells her he is sorry and is no longer interested in her.
18–21 February	Rick	Curtis Oakes	Rick hangs around on the beach with the River Boys. He helps Pee Wee kidnap Dexter Walker (Charles Cottier) he then tells the police it was a prank.
18 February–20 June	Pee Wee	Ty Hungerford	Pee Wee is Rick's accomplice in kidnapping Dexter Walker (Charles Cottier) after he films them. He is seen again when the police question them. Pee Wee goes to Charlie Buckton's (Esther Anderson) birthday party at Angelo's. He gets drunk and tries to flirt with all the women there. Heath Braxton (Dan Ewing) later takes him outside. The next day, Charlie reveals to Heath that Pee Wee was bashed and is in hospital. Pee Wee tries to complete a drug deal on board Romeo Smith's (Luke Mitchell) boat, but is caught by the police.
21 February–31 May	Brodie Upton	Guy Edmonds	Brodie arrives as part of the River Boys. He gets on the wrong side of Colleen Smart (Lyn Collingwood) and begins to harass her. When she is abducted in her caravan, Colleen accuses him. He pleads his innocence. He gives Colleen money, believing he may have been the cause of her abduction. Brodie is involved in harvesting a marijuana crop for the Braxton's. He takes Angelo Rosetta (Luke Jacobz) to the hospital when he is knocked unconscious. Brodie is set up by the Braxton brothers, but he escapes the police and threatens the brothers with a gun. He then turns himself in. Brodie is brought to the hospital with stomach pains. He manages to take Nicole Franklin (Tessa James) hostage, before escaping. Brodie goes to Darryl (Steve Peacocke) for help. He witnesses an exchange between Darryl and Charlie Buckton (Esther Anderson) and asks Darryl to help him escape from the country. He also tells Darryl to get out of the relationship with Charlie.
23 February–31 May	Emily Logan	Madison Kerry	Emily is a Summer Bay student. She appears in a corridor and taunts Dexter Walker (Charles Cottier). When April Scott (Rhiannon Fish) tries to help him, Emily has a go at her too until Bianca (Lisa Gormley) stops her. Emily later teases April when they are paired up for an assignment. Emily briefly dates Romeo Smith (Luke Mitchell). Emily comes to see Sid Walker (Robert Mammone) at the hospital and he confirms that she has chlamydia. She then tells him that she caught it off Romeo.
23 February–26 March 2012	Rob Mitchell	Matty Burn	Rob is a River Boy, who starts spending time in Summer Bay with the main gang. He is present when the River Boys cause trouble at the Surf Club. Rob overhears Romeo Smith (Luke Mitchell) talking about needing money for his charter business and tells Heath Braxton (Dan Ewing) about it. Rob defaces Alf Stewart's (Ray Meagher) election campaign posters and John Palmer (Shane Withington) tells him off.
25 February – 15 March	Leo	Haydn Robertson	Leo is a River Boy who appears alongside the main gang.
24 February – 4 April	Grace Johnson	Clare Chihambakwe	Grace arrives with her son Thabo and new husband Elijah Johnson (Jay Laga'aia). She has married Elijah so she can come to Australia and save Thabo's life. She later decides that she wants Elijah for real. Morag Bellingham (Cornelia Frances) tries to befriend her and finds out about the sham marriage. Grace is left devastated when Thabo dies. Grace and Elijah consummate their relationship, but Grace believes that Elijah still loves Leah Patterson-Baker (Ada Nicodemou). Two immigration officers arrive and question Grace and Elijah. They later take Grace away and Morag tells her that Thabo told a nurse that he believed that her marriage to Elijah was a sham. Grace then makes a statement and asks that Elijah is not punished.
24 February – 21 March	Thabo Manthenga	Joshua Mbakwe	Thabo arrives with his mother Grace Johnson who has married Elijah Johnson (Jay Laga'aia) so he can receive treatment. He is immediately taken to hospital where Sid Walker (Robert Mammone) agrees to do everything he can for him. He starts to get better and is later released from hospital and becomes friends with VJ Patterson (Felix Dean). Thabo becomes ill again and has to have an operation. He goes into arrest and Sid and his fellow doctors try to save him, but Thabo dies.
2 March 2011 – 15 December 2016	Cheryl Braxton	Suzi Dougherty	Cheryl is the mother of Darryl (Steve Peacocke), Heath (Dan Ewing) and Casey Braxton (Lincoln Younes). She comes to the High School to talk with Gina Austin (Sonia Todd) about Casey. Charlie Buckton (Esther Anderson) later pulls Cheryl over for speeding. Cheryl kicks Casey out when he decides to stay in school instead of working with her. She reappears for her son, Heath's marriage to Bianca Scott and in the aftermath, takes Darcy home. In 2016, she reappears to help Heath and Bianca sort out their marriage.
10 March	Bill Lawson	Ian McPhee	Charlie Buckton (Esther Anderson) visits Bill at the Caravan Park to find out more information about Darryl Braxton (Steve Peacocke).
10 March	Cameron Sangster	Jo Turner	Cameron is Darryl Braxton's (Steve Peacocke) lawyer. He asks Charlie Buckton (Esther Anderson) to drop that charges against Darryl.
14 March – 2 June	Keith Irwin	Alan Lovell	Keith runs a victims of crime group that Colleen Smart (Lyn Collingwood) and Morag Bellingham (Cornelia Frances) attend. Colleen meets up with Keith again and he takes her to volunteer at a shelter. Colleen and Keith kiss and they go on a picnic with Leah Patterson-Baker (Ada Nicodemou) and Miles Copeland (Josh Quong Tart). The police raid Keith's home and find marijuana. Colleen is devastated and breaks up with him. Keith later comes to the diner to speak to her.
14 March	Teena	Paige Gardiner	Colleen Smart attends a victims of crime group and listens to Teena's story of how she was held hostage.
14 March	Mick	Michael Howlett	Another member of the victims of crime group that Colleen attends.
18–29 March	Angus McCathie	Tim Pocock	Angus is a university student in Nicole Franklin's (Tessa James) class. He and Nicole go on a date to Angelo's. Angus walk Nicole home and they kiss. Angus goes to an antenatal class with Nicole and he learns that she is giving her baby to Marilyn Chambers. He later tells Nicole that he needs to step back from their relationship.
5 April	Janelle Riley	Dina Gillespie	Janelle runs the Bayside Mission and she employs Elijah Johnson (Jay Laga'aia) to help out.
22–26 April	Billy McVeigh	Dallas Bigelow	Billy comes to the Bayside Mission looking for a room. Elijah Johnson (Jay Laga'aia) tries to help him out and tells Billy that he can stay in his caravan. Billy later attacks Elijah. Billy asks Romeo Smith (Luke Mitchell) for a job and Romeo later asks him to help out on his boat. Morag Bellingham (Cornelia Frances) calls the police on Billy and he is arrested. He is let out on bail and Colleen Smart (Lyn Collingwood) sees him walking along the beach. Elijah confronts him and Billy tries to attack him again, but Elijah manages to restrain him. They then talk and agree to drop the charges against each other.
27 April – 2 June	Vanessa Unley	Sarah Chadwick	Vanessa is an old friend of Gina Austin (Sonia Todd). She comes to the Bay to catch up with Gina. Gina drives Xavier (David Jones-Roberts), April Scott (Rhiannon Fish) and Vanessa to a music festival, but when the festival is cancelled, Vanessa suggests that she and Gina go camping. They have a picnic lunch instead and then rescue Xavier and John, after their car is stuck in the mud.
27 April – 21 June	George	Charlie Clancy-Agius; Scarlett Collum; Jack Place; Luca Raymond; Will Conder; Skye Faulks	George is the son of Nicole Franklin (Tessa James) and Penn Graham (Christian Clark). After finding out she is pregnant, Nicole decides to give the baby to Marilyn Chambers. Nicole goes into labour on the beach and Angelo Rosetta (Luke Jacobz) helps her to deliver a baby boy. After arriving at the hospital, Nicole gives the baby to Marilyn, who names him George. George often cries, which leads Marilyn to think that she is doing something wrong. When Marilyn leaves Nicole alone with George, he begins crying and Nicole breastfeeds him. Marilyn then asks Nicole to stay away from the baby, but she later backs down. Nicole later tells Marilyn that she wants George back and Marilyn takes George. However, she returns him and Nicole leaves Summer Bay with him and Angelo.
9–10 May	Gary O'Connor	Grant Dodwell	Gary is the President of Wilson's Bay Surf Club and John Palmer's rival. Gary comes to Summer Bay for a photo shoot with John the day before the Surf Carnival. John uses Twitter to tell everyone how Gary cheated in the 1975 Surfing Carnival. Gary declares war on John. Wilson's Beach lose and Gary has a heart attack.
24 May	Carla Rosetta	Cris Parker	Carla is Angelo Rosetta's (Luke Jacobz) mother. She goes to the hospital to visit her son and meets Roo Stewart (Georgie Parker) and Nicole Franklin (Tessa James).
3 June – 19 July	Laura Carmody	Roxane Wilson	Laura is a friend of Roo Stewart (Georgie Parker) and she arrives in Summer Bay to catch up with her. Laura and Roo decide to go into business together to organise a fund-raising opportunity for an African hospital. Laura flirts with and later kisses Elijah Johnson (Jay Laga'aia). They then begin dating. Laura helps organise the B&S Ball and sells tickets to the River Boys. Laura decides to leave and she takes Roo's money.
9 June	Douglas Graham	Shane Porteous	Douglas is the grandfather of Penn Graham (Christian Clark). Douglas comes to the Bay to meet his great-grandson, George.
16–22 June	Kate Hanlon	Mikayla Southgate	Dexter Walker (Charles Cottier) is accused of cheating on his trials, when his fellow student, Kate looks at his paper. Kate asks Dex for help with her school work and in return she poses as his girlfriend. Kate later works out that Dexter likes April Scott (Rhiannon Fish) and they fake a break up.
15 July – 9 August	Dean O'Mara	Rick Donald	Dean and his sister, Kelly (Martika Sullivan), arrive in Summer Bay for the B&S Ball. The next day, Dean is in a hurry to leave, but Kelly refuses to go with him. Dean returns two weeks later to visit Kelly and to get her to sign over her share in some farm land. When Kelly refuses, Dean gets angry and John Palmer tells him to leave. Bianca Scott (Lisa Gormley), who was date raped at the B&S Ball, sees Dean on the beach and realises he was the one who raped her. While in his car, Dean runs Bianca down. Liam Murphy (Axle Whitehead) assaults Dean, who is arrested for raping and running down Bianca.
15 July – 2 September	Kelly O'Mara	Martika Sullivan	Kelly and her brother, Dean (Rick Donald), arrive in Summer Bay for the B&S Ball. Kelly is attracted to Xavier Austin (David Jones-Roberts). She refuses to leave the Bay with her brother and stays with Xavier and his parents. She also gets a job at Angelo's. Kelly and Xavier go horse riding and begin dating. Dean returns and tries to get Kelly to sign over some land she owns, but she refuses. Kelly decides to leave town after Dean is arrested for raping Bianca Scott (Lisa Gormley). Xavier follows her to the farm, which delights Kelly. Xavier stays for a while, but decides he needs to go home to his mother.
21 July – 27 October, 25 November 2015 – 27 April 2016	David Joyce	Don Halbertt	David is an Inspector and orders his sergeant; Charlie Buckton (Esther Anderson) to take the River Boys off the streets. He later becomes concerned when Charlie reveals that she has compromised herself by starting a relationship with Darryl Braxton (Steve Peacocke). David tells Charlie that he trusts her and lets her continue on the case. Georgina Watson (Jaclyn Albergoni) thinks that Charlie's relationship with Brax is getting in the way of the investigation; so David takes Charlie off the case. Some time between 2012 and 2015 he is promoted to Superintendent. He suspends Katarina Chapman (Pia Miller).
22–26 July	Mick	Ben Barber	A river boy, who talks to Heath Braxton (Dan Ewing) about an upcoming raid on a rival gang. He later burns a newspaper, featuring a story on a drugs bust, in front of Charlie Buckton (Esther Anderson). He also threatens Bianca Scott (Lisa Gormley) and Liam Murphy (Axle Whitehead).
25–29 July 2014, 1 December 2016 – 2 February 2017	Darcy Callahan	Alea O'Shea	Darcy is Tegan Callahan's (Saskia Burmeister) daughter. Darcy believes her father is Darryl Braxton (Steve Peacocke) and she enjoys spending time with him. However, Tegan later reveals Darcy's real father is Heath Braxton (Dan Ewing). Darcy spends time with Heath and he manages to convince her grandmother Connie (Celia Ireland) to share custody with him. Heath and Darcy befriend Sally Fletcher and her daughter, Pippa Saunders. Darcy returns for her father's marriage to Bianca Scott and is taken home afterwards by Cheryl Braxton (Suzi Dougherty). Darcy enrols at Summer Bay High and develops a crush on Jett James. She bullies a Year 10 girl she sees hanging around him and later throws orange juice on her. Darcy meets her half-brother Harley, but she becomes jealous and takes him out into the bush. Harley becomes sick, and Darcy calls Heath to pick them up. When she breaks her arm falling off an old boat, Darcy hides the injury from Heath. Heath is accused of abusing Darcy. When Heath tells Darcy that he and Harley are moving to the city with Bianca, Darcy is upset as Connie refuses to let her go. She later changes her mind and allows Heath to have full custody. Two years later, Cheryl brings Darcy to Summer Bay after Heath is hospitalised. Knowing Heath and Bianca's marriage is strained, she urges them to sort it out and they agree to try again.
23 August – 1 September	Rhonda O'Mara	May Lloyd	Rhonda is Dean (Rick Donald) and Kelly O'Mara's (Martika Sullivan) mother. She is not happy when Xavier Austin (David Jones-Roberts) turns up at the farm to see Kelly. Rhonda puts him to work around the farm, but is far from impressed by his efforts.
5 September–18 April 2012	Felix Bezmel	Max Felice	Felix is Sasha Bezmel's (Demi Harman) half-brother. He runs away from his father's house and comes to Summer Bay to stay with Sasha. The siblings are caught up in a storm and seek shelter at John Palmer's house. Felix and Sasha find John collapsed on the floor and Sasha calls an ambulance, before they leave the house. Felix stays in the toilets of the empty High School and he is injured when VJ Patterson throws a rock through the window. Felix is taken to the hospital, where he is reunited with Sasha. Sid Walker (Robert Mammone) contacts Felix's father and asks him if Felix can stay with Sasha. His request is denied and Felix leaves. A few months later, Sasha goes to the city to visit Felix. He tells her things at his father's house are better than they were previously.
6 September–28 February 2012	Dennis Harling	Daniel Roberts	Dennis arrives in Summer Bay to start his plans for the planned development of the area. He asks Romeo Smith (Luke Mitchell) to take some clients out on a boat trip. When a storm arrives, Romeo decides against the trip, so Dennis takes up Harvey Ryan's (Marcus Graham) offer instead. While out at sea the boat capsizes and they are forced to swim to the shore, Romeo arrives and saves Dennis. He thanks Romeo by promising him the development charter contract. Romeo later asks Dennis for the agreement in writing, but he says he will not need it written. When Harvey pushes Romeo out of the business and uses Roo Stewart (Georgie Parker) in an attempt to buy the boat – Dennis tells Harvey that he does not want any business with him. Indigo Smith (Samara Weaving) starts her internship with Dennis' business and models for Dennis' beach promotion. Harvey decides to run for council and campaigns against the development project. Harvey enlists Peter (Matthew Moore) to bribe Romeo into getting development plans to use in his smear campaign.
28 September–15 March 2012	Alicia Spears/Angela	Chelsea Giles	Alicia is a Summer Bay High student in the same year as Sasha Bezmel (Demi Harman). She is introduced to Sasha by Dexter Walker (Charles Cottier) on Sasha's first day at school. On her second appearance, where Romeo Smith (Luke Mitchell) serves her at the gelato bar, she is listed as Angela before reverting to Alicia and being given a surname. She is friends with Sasha until Christy Clarke (Isabelle Cornish) starts bullying her. Alicia feels that she cannot stand by Sasha any more. Sasha father, Sid Walker (Robert Mammone), later questions Alicia as to whether Sasha is being bullied and she tells him she has not seen anything.
5–18 October	Samuel Foster	Alexander Bruszt	Sam is a River Boy who makes too much noise at a Braxton house party and refuses to listen to Gina Austin's (Sonia Todd) complaints. He later appears with Benji Perrin (Andrew Steel) who has just been released from prison. Sam and Benji commit a robbery at a petrol station. They plant evidence at the scene to incriminate Darryl Braxton (Steve Peacocke). However, when the police investigate they discover they are the real perpetrators and arrest them.
13 October	Phil Jamison	Adrian Pudlyk	Phil Jamison is a doctor at the hospital. He sets Irene Roberts' (Lynne McGranger) chemotherapy session up. April Scott (Rhiannon Fish) asks Phil how he coped with exam stress and subtly advises her that prescription pills helped.
18–25 October	Benji Perrin	Andrew Steel	Benji is a River Boy who was recently released from prison. He asks Darryl Braxton (Steve Peacocke) for a job and Darryl offers him a delivery job at his restaurant, which Benji turns down. He later robs a petrol station. Darryl comes to Benji and threatens him for information about the robbery. The police bring Benji in for questioning and he tells them Darryl was driving the getaway car.
18–22 October	Simon Peet	Rory Williamson	Simon runs a petrol station and is the victim of a robbery. He talks to Charlie Buckton (Esther Anderson) about the crime and he later asks her out. They go to the Diner for coffee, but Charlie tells him she does not want to start a relationship with him.
24 October	Tai chi instructor	Jackie Murray	A tai chi instructor holds a class on the beach and local students attend to relieve their exam stress.
2 November	Lachie	Gig Clarke	Lachie sit down with Sasha Bezmel (Demi Harman) in the Surf Club; claiming that he wants a break from his friends. Sasha refuses to give out her number and he introduces Ruby Buckton (Rebecca Breeds) to his friend, Dan (Rémy Brand). When her boyfriend, Stu Henderson (Brenton Thwaites) sees Sasha talking to Lachie, he takes her away. Lachie takes Sasha's number from Ruby's phone when she is not looking and texts Sasha. Stu confronts Lachie, who calls him a bogan. After a fight, the River Boys chase Lachie and Dan away.
2 November	Dan	Remy Brand	Dan meets Ruby Buckton (Rebecca Breeds) in the Surf Club and he flirts with her. Ruby tells Dan that she has a boyfriend. Dan is chased away from the Surf Club by the River Boys.
2 November	Luke	Nick Shields	Luke approaches Xavier Austin (David Jones-Roberts) claiming he is interested in buying his car. However, after a test drive he tells Xavier he is no longer interested causing an argument.
3 November–17 February 2012	Dallas Phillips	Emma Griffin	Dallas turns up in Summer Bay during schoolies. Xavier Austin (David Jones-Roberts) reveals Dallas' nickname is the "virgin slayer". Dallas takes a shine to Dexter Walker (Charles Cottier) and during a party, she kisses him. Dexter explains he has a girlfriend and leaves. Dex later encounters Dallas at the hospital and learns she has a three-year-old son called William. Dex gets Dallas a job in the Surf Club and a home in the caravan park. Dex comes to Dallas and asks if she will have sex with him. Dallas turns him down and Dex apologises.
3 November	Melissa	Carissa Walford	Melissa hangs out on the beach with her two friends for Schoolies week. She notices that Romeo Smith (Luke Mitchell) is running a surf school and asks for a lesson.
4 November	Girl Schoolie	Sarah Pope	A schoolie girl who has a surfing lesson with Romeo Smith (Luke Mitchell).
7 November	Schoolies girl	Demi Bryant	Mink Smith (Matylda Buczko) watches Romeo Smith (Luke Mitchell) give a schoolie girl a surfing lesson.
8 November	Carrie	Shannon Dooley	Carrie is Irene Roberts' (Lynne McGranger) nurse who gives her the news that she is in remission. Sid Walker (Robert Mammone) pays a visit to Irene, who notices that Carrie likes Sid. Irene organises a date between to two and then realises Roo Stewart (Georgie Parker) still has feelings for Sid. Irene interrupts their date to tell him the news. Sid tells Irene that he is glad that she got him away from Carrie.
11 November	Gary	Daniel Marsh	Gary sees April Scott (Rhiannon Fish) walking along the beach in her bikini. He and his fellow River Boys think she is attractive and start whistling at her.
12 November	Jonathan Brewer	Louis McIntosh	April Scott (Rhiannon Fish) and Ruby Buckton (Rebecca Breeds) spot Jonathan at a car sale. April tells Ruby that he is the perfect candidate to lose her virginity to at the school formal. Jonathan tells April that his father is buying him a car and he could take her to the formal as his date. Ruby later talks April out of it and Jonathan is okay with being let down by April.
15 November–7 February 2012	Geoffrey King	Geoff Morrell	Geoffrey is a businessman. Heath Braxton (Dan Ewing) contacts Geoffrey and informs him that his brother, Darryl (Steve Peacocke), is selling his restaurant, Angelo's. Geoffrey comes to the Bay with his family to look at the restaurant. He makes an offer, but Brax rejects it after learning Geoffrey will be using the place as a front for illegal activities. Geoffrey refuses to give up and resorts to dirty tactics. He manipulates Heath into buying a large quantity of alcohol for the bar, resulting in a huge debt. Geoffrey then threatens Brax with a gun and he calls his bluff. Leah Patterson-Baker (Ada Nicodemou) witnesses this and pays off the debt for Brax.
16 November	Cody Matthews	Melissa Ambrosini	Cody arrives in Summer Bay to attend a surfing competition. She spots Mink Smith (Matylda Buczko) and mocks her surfing. When Mink is struggling out at sea, Cody tells Mink's brother, Romeo Smith (Luke Mitchell), that Mink has been turning up to surfing competitions drunk.
18 November–17 February 2012	William Phillips	Daniel Place	William is the son of Dallas Phillips (Emma Griffin) who is sent to hospital. Dexter Walker (Charles Cottier) plays a game to get him drink his water. Dexter soon discovers that Dallas is living in her car, so he gets a caravan for them to stay in.
21 November	Peter	Matthew Moore	Peter is hired by Harvey Ryan (Marcus Graham) to gain information about Dennis Harling's (Daniel Roberts) development for Summer Bay. He tries to gain information from Alf Stewart (Ray Meagher), who refuses. He then approaches Romeo Smith (Luke Mitchell) to find information from his wife Indigo Walker (Samara Weaving) and bribes him with money. Romeo finds development plans and hands them to Peter and Romeo later realises he has been conned.
