= Romeo Smith =

Fictional character from the Australian Channel Seven soap opera Home and Away

- Home and Away character
- Portrayed by: Luke Mitchell
- Duration: 2009–2013
- First appearance: 10 September 2009
- Last appearance: 23 October 2013
- Introduced by: Cameron Welsh
In-universe information
- Occupation: Surf instructor and lifeguard; Student at Summer Bay High; Skipper; Surfer; Salesman; Gym owner
- Mother: Jill Carpenter
- Sisters: Mink Carpenter
- Wife: Indi Walker (2011–2013)

Todd "Romeo" Smith is a fictional character from the Australian Channel Seven soap opera Home and Away, played by Luke Mitchell. He made his first appearance on 10 September 2009. The character of Romeo is Mitchell's third acting job and he began filming his scenes in May 2009. Romeo is described as being cheeky, funny and confident. His storylines have included his relationships with Annie Campbell and Indi Walker and the introduction of his sister and mother. Romeo and Mitchell have proven popular and Mitchell won "Most Popular New Male Talent" at the 2010 Logie Awards. On 4 November 2012, it was revealed that Mitchell had decided to leave Home and Away. Romeo made his last appearance on 3 April 2013, but made a brief cameo appearance in Indigo's dream on 23 October 2013.

== Casting ==
The role of Romeo is Mitchell's third acting job, having previously appeared in Neighbours and H_{2}O: Just Add Water. Mitchell was given the part after he moved to Sydney with no work. He said "I was applying for regular jobs and had a trial in the local bowling alley when my agent called me about the role, I went to the bathroom to take the call and he told me I had the job". Mitchell began filming his first scenes in May 2009.

On 4 November 2012, it was reported that Mitchell had left Home and Away, along with Axle Whitehead (Liam Murphy). The actors had already filmed their final scenes, while their characters remained on-screen until 3 April 2013 but made a brief cameo appearance on 23 October 2013.

== Character development ==
=== Characterisation ===
Romeo is described as good looking and "cheeky, funny and gentlemanly". He knows how to "turn on the charm" and flirts with every woman he meets. Romeo is also "sharp as a tack" and can bite back. Mitchell describes his character as being "very good with the girls, but not in a sleazy way". "He gets a kick out of seeing a girl smile rather than getting her phone number". Mitchell also added that his character is different to him, he said "He's so confident and I can be quite shy, so it's liberating".

=== Family ===
In January 2010, Romeo's sister, Mink Carpenter (Matylda Buczko), was introduced. Mink, who was called Romeo's "mysterious sister", arrives in the Bay to see her brother after she is released from a youth detention center for an unknown crime. Mink is a surfer, like her brother, and is described as being "stroppy" and having "plenty of sass and street smarts". Despite the siblings being apart for several years, Mink is quick to defend her brother and she punches John Palmer (Shane Withington), when he insults Romeo. It is later revealed that Mink killed her and Romeo's abusive stepfather. Mink and Romeo have a heart-to-heart and she later decides to leave the bay.

A few months later, Romeo's mother Jill Carpenter (Josephine Mitchell), arrives in the Bay. Jill is an alcoholic and even though Romeo loves her, he is humiliated by her actions and wants his mother to be normal. Romeo has turned into the adult in their relationship. Jill has used the life insurance money she received after the death of her husband to buy drink. Of her arrival, Mitchell said "She comes back to the Bay to try to re-establish her relationship with her son Romeo". The storyline between Romeo and Jill was character-driven, of this Mitchell said "Even though the underlying issue is the alcoholism it was very much the relationship between Romeo and his mother and how her relationship with others filters through the community".

=== Relationship with Indi Walker ===
Romeo begins dating Indi Walker (Samara Weaving) following his split from Annie Campbell (Charlotte Best). Mitchell hinted at a romance between the pair before Weaving returned to the screen again in June 2010. Mitchell said "They meet at school. There's an attraction, because Indi's a beautiful girl, but Romeo isn't looking for a girlfriend. He's still heartbroken over Annie". He added that Romeo and Indigo have a lot in common and that she goes out of her way to see that he is okay. The character's friendship begins to develop into something more and Weaving admitted that Indigo and Romeo were likely to face a "rocky road" before they eventually got together. Their first kiss comes as a surprise and Weaving said "It's quite funny because Indi is yelling at Romeo for reading into their friendship too much, and then he decides to just kiss her as she's half-way through telling him off!" Weaving said that the kiss is what Indigo has "always wanted ever since she saw him", so she forgets that she is angry with Romeo. However, Weaving explained that the pair would not get together quickly, saying "Indi responds well to the kiss, but there's definitely still some speed bumps pending in them getting together. Indi definitely thinks that this is going to be a relationship, whereas Romeo has his doubts about it." In October 2010, Weaving revealed that Indi would confess a secret to Romeo. Indi is reluctant to take their relationship to the next level because of an unresolved issue from a previous relationship. She starts ignoring Romeo in a bid to avoid the problem, but she eventually tells him that her ex-boyfriend started dating her mother. Weaving said that Indi avoids Romeo because she has not got closure over her past relationship. She added "[Indi] didn't realise until she got close to Romeo that she still has unresolved feelings about her past". Romeo encourages Indi to talk to her mother and attempt to sort things out.

Mitchell revealed in January 2011 that Romeo and Indi's relationship would come under strain. Mitchell said "There are a lot of interesting times ahead for Romeo. A lot of relationship stuff, a lot of ups and downs. He goes through a really torturous time. It's a very rocky path." Indi and Romeo start drifting apart after she goes to university and Romeo remains at high school. Mitchell also commented on a teaser clip, which showed Romeo kissing Ruby Buckton (Rebecca Breeds), he said "I saw the teaser and was like, 'Wow, that's certainly going to raise some eyebrows!'. She decides that Romeo is the guy for her, but time will tell if this is actually the case." Executive producer Cameron Welsh promised viewers that the storyline would play a big part of the serial in 2011. He also stated: "Fans will definitely take sides on this one. Luke Mitchell, Rebecca Breeds and Samara Weaving are having a great time with this storyline, and we'll see a new side to all of them as they face the consequences of their actions." After Romeo has sex with Ruby, Mitchell said his character immediately regrets it and realises that Indi is the right girl for him. Ruby reveals the truth to Indi. Weaving said her "knight in shining armour has been shattered" as she thought Romeo was the one person who wouldn't cheat; Indi cannot "understand the circumstances" which have led to Romeo's infidelity. She said that they could repair their relationship; "she just needs time to grieve" and that viewers expected them to part ways.

Romeo and Indi get back together and while on a trip to Hawaii, Romeo proposes. The Hawaii shoot was announced in February 2011 by Cameron Welsh. He revealed that it would be a big story, while The Sunday Telegraph reported that Weaving was one of four cast members who had travelled to Hawaii for a "powerful storyline". It was later announced that Mitchell, along with Georgie Parker and Robert Mammone, had also travelled to Hawaii to film the storyline. The storyline sees Roo Stewart (Parker) and Romeo travel to Hawaii to attend a tourism exhibition. Parker explained "I think Roo has just championed Romeo's cause a bit – she sees a young man who has some drive and wants to encourage him to do his best." Roo is not happy when she learns that Romeo traded in his business class ticket for two economy seats so Indi can join them. However, Indi helps win over Roo and Romeo's business acquaintance, Marty. Marty makes Indi a job offer, which leads to Romeo proposing. Mitchell told TV Week: "The fact that Indi's been offered a job brings up the prospect of being separated from her again. And Romeo doesn't deal with that well. He's finally got the girl of his dreams, and she might be going away." Weaving described the proposal as "beautiful" and said her character is "shocked, but also just overwhelmed with happiness." The Herald Sun reported that Romeo and Indi "get caught up in the romance of Hawaii" and marry. In a July 2011 interview Welsh explained that the newlyweds will face challenges when they discover marriage is hard work and their relationship will be put under strain.

== Storylines ==
Romeo arrives in town looking for Jai Fernandez (Jordan Rodrigues), his old friend from foster care. He is taken in by Miles Copeland (Josh Quong Tart), Jai's foster father. Gina Austin (Sonia Todd) persuades Romeo to go back to school. It is later revealed that Romeo's family broke down when his mother killed his abusive stepfather to protect him and his sister took the blame. His sister, Mink, arrives in town and a few months later, his alcoholic mother, Jill (Josephine Mitchell), arrives too. Romeo and Mink part on good terms, but he and Jill do not. He dates Annie Campbell for a while until she chooses to return to Japan. Romeo then starts dating Indigo Walker and they enjoy spending time with each other. Romeo is put to work in the kitchen at the Diner as his presence starts to interfere with Indi's work. Romeo later decides that he is ready to lose his virginity, but Indi leaves the house crying and without explaining to Romeo why. He tries calling her, but she does not answer. He then talks to Nicole Franklin (Tessa James) about what happened and she tells him that she will speak to Indi. Romeo snaps at Bianca Scott (Lisa Gormley) for moving on too quickly from her relationship with his friend, Liam Murphy (Axle Whitehead). Indi finds Romeo and tells him that they need to take things more slowly. Romeo is angry when Indi confesses that she took and read a letter from Annie to him. Indi believes that Romeo is still in love with Annie and Romeo proves to her that she is the only one for him. Indi then apologises for how she has been acting and the two reconcile.

Romeo reveals to Indi that he deliberately failed his HSC because he loves her and wants to be with her. Indi passes her HSC and begins university, while Romeo repeats Year 12. Romeo starts to question his relationship with Indi and he becomes frustrated with being back in school while Indi is at university meeting lots of people. Romeo becomes friends with Casey Braxton (Lincoln Younes) after they end up in detention together. Indi leaves Romeo some cryptic clues for a special night she has planned for him, but he believes Indi is going to end their relationship. Romeo instead goes to see Ruby Buckton, who tells Romeo that she likes him, and they have sex. Romeo is shocked when he learns that Indi was not going to break up with him. He tells Ruby that he and Indi are still together and that nothing will ever happen between them because he loves Indi. Ruby tells Indi that she and Romeo had sex, devastating both Indi and Romeo. Romeo tries to apologise, but Sid (Robert Mammone) refuses to let him into the house. Romeo invites Indi out on a picnic and she goes, but tells Romeo that they are over. Romeo drops out of school, which Miles and Morag Bellingham (Cornelia Frances) disapprove of. Romeo meets Emily Logan (Madison Kerry) and they have sex. Romeo loses interest in her and tells her that she meant nothing to him, appalling Indi. Romeo spends time working at the shelter and decides to stop wallowing and take action. He starts a Surf School business. Romeo does not like Indi's new admirer, Kieran Monroe (Andrew Hazzard), and warns Indi not to go out with him, but she refuses to listen. Kieran turns nasty one night and Indi calls Romeo, who rescues her.

After getting approval from Morag and advice from Roo, Romeo starts a chartering business with Alf Stewart's (Ray Meagher) boat, the Blaxland. Sid warns Romeo off of Indi and he agrees, which annoys Indi. However, he decides to profess his feelings for her and they get back together. Sid is not happy and expresses his distrust of Romeo at a dinner. Romeo discovers that he has Chlamydia and tries to contact Ruby. When Casey finds out, he punches Romeo. The Blaxland breaks and Romeo attempts to fix it himself. Romeo gets distracted trying to stop a River Boy fight and neglects his lifesaving duty. When a man nearly drowns, John Palmer (Shane Withington) sacks Romeo. Romeo becomes desperate to fix the boat and agrees to take two River Boys out on a charter. He then becomes caught up in a drugs bust. Morag tells Romeo that he cannot use the Blaxland for his business, but Roo decides to be his mentor and Morag changes her mind. Roo invites Romeo to Hawaii after he is chosen to represent Summer Bay Tourism. Romeo exchanges his business class ticket for two economy ones and invites Indi to go with him. During their trip, Romeo proposes to Indi and she accepts. They decide to get married straight away. Sid arrives in Hawaii, but gives Romeo and Indi his blessing. They marry and on their return home, they move in with Roo. When they start to struggle financially, Romeo and Indi move into the Farmhouse.

Romeo starts giving surfing lessons and later lends a large amount of money to his sister, which upsets Indi. She urges him to get a job with the new resort, which he does. However, Romeo quits shortly after to start surfing in competitions. Ruby decides to join Romeo on the circuit, which makes Indi become jealous. When Indi catches Romeo and Ruby sharing a motel room she jumps to the wrong conclusion and later goes out with Logan Meyer (David Berry). Romeo pleads with Indi to make their marriage work and she agrees. They go on a holiday and when they return, Indi vows to trust Ruby and support Romeo with his surfing. However, the couple soon realise that they got married too young. Indi reveals that she slept with Logan, while Romeo admits to kissing Ruby. Indi continues to see Logan and Romeo insinuates that she is a gold-digger. Romeo admits to Ruby that he has feelings for her and they start dating. Romeo wins a surfing competition, but when he is nearly hit by a car, he badly injures his knee. Sid tells Romeo that he will probably not be able to surf again. Ruby suggests that she and Romeo go into business together using the money she inherited from Charlie's death. She transfers some money to Romeo, but when Indi tells Romeo that she is in debt and thinking of dropping out of university, he lends her Ruby's money. When Romeo learns that Ruby has warned Indi off, he confronts her about her manipulation. When Romeo goes to break up with Ruby, she tells him she is pregnant. Romeo does not take the news well, but vows to stick by Ruby and the baby. However, Ruby later confesses she made the pregnancy up and Romeo breaks up with her, confessing that he still loves Indi. Ruby tampers with the breaks to Indi's car, which results in Dexter Walker (Charles Cottier) being in a near-fatal accident, leaving him with brain damage. During this time, Indi has a brief relationship with Liam, leaving Romeo hurt, but determined to win her back.

The pair eventually reunite following Dex's accident and they remarry in an intimate ceremony with their family and friends. They also embark on a new business venture, opening the Summer Bay Body and Soul gym. Not long after, Romeo begins experiencing pain in his upper back. After consulting with Sid Walker (Robert Mammone), he learns he has stage four melanoma and begins chemotherapy. Romeo asks Sid not to tell Indi and Sid reluctantly agrees. Realising that he is going to die and unwilling to put Indi through anymore heartache, Romeo plans a romantic getaway for the two of them as a way to say goodbye. He leaves a letter for her, still not divulging his cancer diagnosis, and goes to meet Liam, who has also decided to leave the Bay. The two ride off on Liam's motorcycle. Not long after, Romeo signs over the gym to Indi. A few months later, Indi receives news from Liam that Romeo has died. His ashes were returned to the Bay and sprinkled across the cliff where the couple had spent their last night together. Romeo later appears to Indi in a dream.

== Reception ==
For his portrayal of Romeo, Mitchell won the "Most Popular New Male Talent" Logie Award in 2010. Holy Soap said that Romeo's most memorable moment was "Showing off his ripped physique shortly after arriving in Summer Bay". The character has become popular in terms of his appearance. Nick Levine of media and entertainment website Digital Spy claimed, in a section aimed specifically at gay readers, that Romeo is the "new fitty in Home and Away". Levine also said "Luke Mitchell, [..] plays a character called Romeo – well, if the cap fits". After Romeo has sex with Ruby and tells they have no future, Erin Miller of TV Week said "What has happened to good guy Romeo? He's always been the dependable and loveable guy in Summer Bay but this week audiences have seen a nastier side to him."

In a Holy Soap poll to find Home and Away's "All-time hottest couple", Romeo and Indigo came in second place with 38% of the vote. Debbie Schipp of the Herald Sun said Romeo and Indigo are "one of Summer Bay's most angst-ridden and gorgeous couples." The character's wedding was named as the fourth best television wedding from 2011 by Yahoo! TV. Of Romeo's relationship with Ruby, Erin Miller of TV Week wrote "the romance between Ruby and Romeo has been pretty awkward to watch – given it's clear he's still in love with his ex!" Claire Crick from All About Soap commented that Romeo and Ruby were "so hot together." She continued "We also have to confess that the fact that Rebecca Breeds and Luke Mitchell, who play Ruby and Romeo, are dating in real life makes us love them even more… See, they're a match made in sunny Aussie heaven! So move over, Indi – it's time for Rumeo to brighten up Summer Bay!"
