= Danny Roberts (Australian actor) =

Australian actor

- Born: Daniel Roberts; 27 January 1966 (age 60); Perth, Western Australia, Australia
- Occupation: Actor
- Years active: 1983–present
- Known for: Sons and Daughters (1983–1987); Home and Away (1997, 2011–2012, 2015)
- Spouse: Lindsay Neil (m. 1989)
- Children: 2 including David Jones-Roberts

Daniel Roberts (born 27 January 1966), also credited as Danny Roberts, is an Australian actor. He is perhaps best known for his role as Andy Green on the long running Australian soap opera Sons and Daughters from 1983 to 1987.

== Early life ==
Roberts was born in Perth, Western Australia on 27 January 1966. He started with the Patch Theatre at age 12, and was in the first round at Western Australian Academy of Performing Arts in 1979.

== Acting career ==
Roberts moved to Melbourne in 1982 where he appeared in Cop Shop and The Sullivans. He then played a lead role in the soap opera Waterloo Station (1983), but the series was cancelled after a few months on air. Roberts then joined the main cast of Sons and Daughters as Andy Green in September 1983. He remained with the series until it ended in 1987.

Roberts went on to a regular role in soap opera The Power, The Passion, which ran for eight months in 1989. After the series was cancelled he moved to Byron Bay, New South Wales, where he founded the Australian Theatre Company in 1991. He was artistic director of the company until 1995. Following this, he appeared in the series Fire, playing Georgie Parker's character's brother, Ted Cartright. He also played Nate's father Gavin Cooper on Home and Away.

Roberts' television credits include Blue Heelers, Murder Call, Stingers, Young Lions, Big Sky and the first two seasons of Underbelly.

His film credits include Blackwater Trail, Walking on Water, Beneath Clouds, Mission: Impossible 2, and Dreamland

== Personal life ==
After Sons and Daughters, Roberts travelled to the United States, where he met his future wife Lindsay Neil. They married in 1989. They had two children. His son David Jones-Roberts appeared in Home and Away as Xavier Austin from 2008 until 2013.

== Filmography ==
=== Film ===
| Year | Title | Role | Type |
|---|---|---|---|
| 1995 | Blackwater Trail | Davies | TV movie |
| 1995 | The Last Bullet | Williams | TV movie |
| 1999 | Close Contact | Wyatt | TV movie |
| 2000 | House! | Andy | Feature film |
| 2000 | Mission: Impossible 2 | Co-pilot | Feature film |
| 2002 | Walking on Water | Carl | Feature film |
| 2002 | Beneath Clouds | | Feature film |
| 2004 | What Grown-Ups Know | Maurice | Short film |
| 2004 | The Silence | David Dawkins | TV movie |
| 2009 | Invasion | The Stranger | Short film |
| 2010 | Dreamland | Dan Freeman | Feature film |
| 2011 | Killer Elite | Simon McCann | Feature film |
| 2013 | Mystery Road | Macca | Feature film |

=== Television ===
| Year | Title | Role | Type |
|---|---|---|---|
| | Cop Shop | | TV series |
| | The Sullivans | | TV series |
| 1983 | Waterloo Station | Trevor Brown | TV series |
| 1983–87 | Sons and Daughters | Andy Green | TV series, 559 episodes |
| 1989 | The Power, The Passion | Samuel Wright | TV series |
| 1995 | Fire | Ted Cartwright | TV series, 5 episodes |
| 1996 | Blue Heelers | Craig Robertson | TV series, 1 episode: "Dead and Alive" |
| 1997 | Home and Away | Tony O'Rourke | TV series, 2 episodes |
| 1997 | Fallen Angels | Quentin | TV series, 1 episode: "In Defence of Electricity" |
| 1997 | Murder Call | Matt Propert | TV series, 1 episode: "Black Friday" |
| 1998 | All Saints | Mr Jennings | TV series, season 1, 1 episode: "Think Positive" |
| 1999 | Big Sky | Johnny | TV series, 2 episodes |
| 2001 | Water Rats | Fred Pearson | TV series, 1 episode |
| 2002 | Jeopardy | Policeman | TV series, 1 episode: "Pilot" |
| 2002 | Young Lions | Ross Kennedy | TV miniseries, 1 episode: "Lone Star Blues" |
| 2004 | All Saints | David McLachlan | TV series, season 7, 1 episode: "Peripheral Vision" |
| 2004 | Stingers | Jake Taylor | TV series, 3 episodes |
| 2005 | McLeod's Daughters | Joe Kershaw | TV series, 1 episode: "Do You Read Me...?" |
| 2009 | Underbelly: A Tale of Two Cities | James 'Jimbo' Egan | TV series, 8 episodes |
| 2010 | Underbelly: The Golden Mile | James 'Jimbo' Egan | TV series, 13 episodes |
| 2010 | Cops L.A.C. | Brett | TV series, 1 episode: "Illegal Dumping" |
| 2011 | Rescue: Special Ops | Graham Cooper | TV series, 1 episode: "The Dunes" |
| 2011 | Wild Boys | Mulligan Jones | TV series, 1 episode |
| 2011–12 | Home and Away | Dennis Harling | TV series, 14 episodes |
| 2014 | Old School | Andy Muir | TV miniseries, 1 episode: "Her Weight in Gold" |
| 2015 | Home and Away | Gavin Cooper | TV series, 6 episodes |
| 2018 | Tidelands | Grayson Raxter | TV series, 4 episodes |
