= Ashley Cheadle =

Australian actress and surfer

Ashley Cheadle is an Australian actress and surfer.

== Early life ==
Cheadle is from a family of five. Her older brother, Luke Cheadle, is a professional surfer. Her father was also once a competitive surfer.

== Career ==
Cheadle's professional surfing was sponsored by surf-wear giant Billabong, which promoted her as a member of the company's "Billabong Girls" team. She participated in tournaments and in special events designed to cultivate public interest in surfing.

Cheadle's association with Billabong included a featured role in the 2006 Billabong-sponsored surf film Free as a Dog. Cheadle then appeared in the Australian television series Blue Water High and in the Hollywood movie Fool's Gold (2008 film).

Cheadle joined the cast of Home and Away as Miranda Jacobs in April 2011.
