= Liam Murphy (Home and Away) =

Character from the television series Home and Away

- Home and Away character
- Portrayed by: Axle Whitehead
- Duration: 2009–2013
- First appearance: 5 March 2009
- Last appearance: 3 April 2013
- Introduced by: Cameron Welsh
In-universe information
- Occupation: Musician; Tutor; Barman; Teacher at Summer Bay High (2010–11)
- Wife: Chelsea Hutchins (until 2010); Bianca Scott (2012–13)
- Sons: Ash Murphy

Liam Murphy is a fictional character from the Australian Channel Seven soap opera Home and Away, played by Axle Whitehead. The character debuted on-screen during the episode airing on 5 March 2009. Whitehead auditioned for the role and stated it would help improve his acting skill. Liam was created by executive producer Cameron Welsh and is described as a "badboy minor rockstar" who comes to Summer Bay to start a new life. His storylines have focused on his addiction to drugs and many relationships. Liam has also been involved in controversial scenes in which it featured "sexually charged content" with fellow character Martha MacKenzie. Whitehead's departure was announced in November 2012. He made his final appearance as Liam on 3 April 2013.

== Creation and casting ==
Musician and presenter Axle Whitehead was chosen to play Liam after he auditioned for the role. Whitehead has stated that he jumped at the chance to audition because he believes the serial is a good place to improve acting skills. Speaking the role Whitehead has stated: "I've been taking classes for the last 18 months and it’s wonderful to be able to put it into practice. Home and Away has been very supportive, the pace of the show is very challenging and it’s been a fantastic opportunity for me to further my skills." Whitehead was originally only signed to a fifteen-episode contract.

On 4 November 2012, it was reported that Whitehead had left Home and Away, along with Luke Mitchell (Romeo Smith). The actors had already filmed their final scenes. Their characters departed on-screen on 3 April 2013.

== Development ==
The serial's official website describe Liam branding him a "disgraced minor rock star". Liam makes some changes to his life and returns to Summer Bay to make amends, they add he is "clean and eager to start a new life." and that he hopes will keep him on "the straight and narrow". Liam likes to be in relationship's and the website state "he doesn't like to be alone for long." Whitehead himself describes Liam as "a bit of a bad-boy rocker. There'll be some blues and a bit of lovin' – I'm channelling Bon Scott." Whitehead draws inspiration from his past experiences with old friends to portray Liam's drug taking.

Speaking of his characters relationship with Bianca Scott (Lisa Gormley) when she agrees to marry Vittorio Seca (Richard Brancatisano), Whitehead states: "Liam puts on a tough-guy act and pretends everything is cool and that he's moved on – but I don't know if that's really the truth. Bianca is marrying someone else and Liam has a new girlfriend, so this could spell the end for any future they might've had."

As the storyline progresses Liam feels hurt about the whole situation because he thinks Bianca doesn't want him, of this Whitehead states: "Liam's being quite sensitive about the issue. If Bianca's engaged to Vittorio, then she's clearly made her decision." However he goes on to add: "There are still very strong feelings there, though – and at the formal, after being tricked into going as chaperones for the kids, they can actually sit and talk about things. They're like, 'Let's get out of here and talk about the past' – and it gets a bit hot and steamy!" Whitehead added that the storyline results in "a really good week of episodes" for the characters, as Bianca chooses who she wants to be with.

== Storylines ==
Liam first appears during a concert. Belle Taylor (Jessica Tovey) interviews him and admits she is a fan. After he offers her drugs and they get intoxicated. Liam is next seen in rehab along with Belle, they form a friendship. He admits his wife Chelsea (Georgia Gorman) has left him and banned him from seeing his son Ash (Dusty Piper). He accuses Belle of selling a story on him, but he later finds out the truth and the remain friends. When they are both released Liam comes to Summer Bay to enlist Belle's help to try to see his son. However another story in printed in the paper and Chelsea wants nothing to do with him and he loses his recording contract.

Liam moves in with Belle and wants a relationship with her. She turns him down and Aden Jefferies (Todd Lasance) warns Belle that he is trouble. After Belle thinks he has overdosed she agrees to see how things go and dates Liam until she finds drugs on him. She ends things and takes him to the hospital. He climbs on the roof and tries to kill himself but Aden talks him around. Belle admits she still loves Aden. He returns later claiming to be clean, he wants to see Belle who is now dying of cancer but cannot face it. He goes to her funeral high on drugs and causes a scene. He sleeps with Nicole Franklin (Tessa James) and runs away.

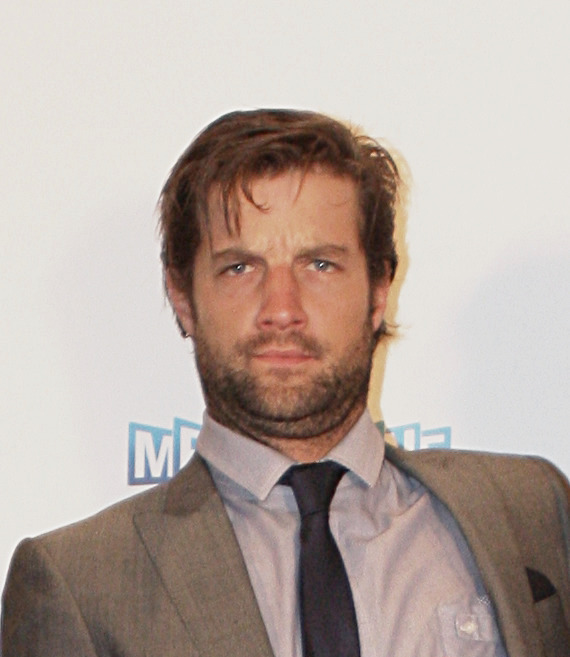
Axle Whitehead (pictured) was originally signed to appear in just fifteen episodes of Home and Away.

He moves to Summer Bay to make a fresh start around people who know him. He gives Romeo Smith (Luke Mitchell) a job on the conversion he is doing. He then starts a relationship with Nicole, but when she misses her exams Aden convinces her to break up with Liam. They start seeing each other again on the quiet. At a party Liam throws Ned out who has taken drugs. Romeo drinks a beverage spiked with drugs and collapses. He convinces Aden not to call the emergency services and take him to the hospital because everybody would assume he was behind it. Liam and Nicole's relationship hits a hurdle when she won't sleep with him. He admits he loves her but confused by this he sleeps with a young woman, Poppie. Nicole dumps him for cheating, and he later tells Poppie to leave him alone when she takes drugs.

Liam sees Aden and Nicole kissing and upset he takes a pill and is charged with drug possession. He tries to get help from Gina Austin (Sonia Todd), makes peace with Nicole and Aden before moving out. He sleeps with Martha MacKenzie (Jodi Gordon), but she wants a casual relationship which annoys Liam. She manages to get Gina to agree to letting Liam be a guitar tutor at the school. Martha has a pregnancy scare and he does not like the idea of being a father. They sleep together again, but Martha still does not want a relationship. Xavier Austin (David Jones-Roberts suspects Liam is taking drugs again and he did not want to ruin his friendship with Martha, so he decides to move out. Liam starts working at the school with Ruby Buckton (Rebecca Breeds), they become good friends and Ruby starts to fall for him. He finds out from Nicole and after advice from Alf Stewart (Ray Meagher) he continues to work with her until she makes a pass at him.

A new language teacher, Bianca Scott, arrives to work at Summer Bay High, he feels an attraction to her. They sleep together in the library. Bianca's ex Vittorio returns to resume their relationship. Bianca agrees to marry him, even though she still likes Liam. He feels hurt that she does not want him and tries to accept the situation. On Bianca's wedding day she decides not to go through with it and chooses Liam. She and her sister April (Rhiannon Fish) move into the field house with Liam, but they later decide to move in with Irene. Liam then moves in with Angelo Rosetta (Luke Jacobz) and Roo Stewart (Georgie Parker). Liam's is dumped by his record label and he buys some pills from Heath Braxton (Daniel Ewing). When Liam covers a class for Miles and sets the students an assignment, in which they have to plan a terrorist attack against Summer Bay. Gina withdraws the assignment and Liam is reported to the school authorities. He takes some pills before a meeting with the state education officer. Liam launches a verbal attack and the meeting is cut short. Gina later tells him that he can no longer teach at Summer Bay High. Liam takes more pills and Bianca finds out, they break up. Liam then decides to check into rehab. He returns to the Bay unannounced and learns Bianca was raped and that she had a one-night stand with Heath. Charlie Buckton (Esther Anderson) asks Liam to testify against Heath on drug charges, Liam agrees, but is later beaten up. Liam shuts Bianca out, but they eventually talk and forgive each other. Liam moves into the caravan park and asks Gina for some tutoring work, but she cannot give him any. Bianca realises Dean O'Mara (Rick Donald) raped her and she and Liam try to find him. Dean runs Bianca down and Liam later finds him and beats him up. Liam and Bianca break up and Liam is offered a job by Darryl Braxton (Steve Peacocke). He was further upset to see her talking with Heath but accepted a job working for Brax at the restaurant. When he heard Bianca had been trapped when the school collapsed, he went to see if she was all right but was upset to see her joking with Heath and ended up in an argument with her. After April chided him for his behaviour, he asked Gypsy, newly arrived in town, to pass on a letter to Bianca for him. He met her at the hospital while visiting Irene, who was undergoing treatment for breast cancer, and they agreed to an amicable split and he was disappointed to see her with Heath and Darcy not long after. He tried to help out when Gypsy and Bianca were harassed by a patron at the restaurant and later consoled Gypsy when she was stood up by her boyfriend Mark, as well as looking after Lily when she avoided meeting him. When a singer he'd arranged to play at the restaurant cancelled, Gypsy and Lily persuaded him to play instead and he and Gypsy got on well after the gig. He was pleased to hear Bianca was jealous but when he spoke to her she snapped at him and started eyeing up Heath.

When he went round the Braxton house to drop the float off and found Bianca there in her dressing gown, he assumed something had happened and ended up having sex with Gypsy on the beach. Gypsy's boyfriend Mark later turned up and threatened him over their fling. The next day, he spoke to Gypsy, admitting he'd used her to try to get over Bianca, and helped her realise she wouldn't have slept with him if she was serious about Mark. He wound up Brax when his relationship with Charlie made front-page news. When he heard April had collapsed because of drug use and Colleen claimed Heath was responsible, Liam went to confront him only for Bianca to step in and reveal Heath was innocent. He later commented to Miles that you know when a relationship is over. He saw Harvey Ryan sabotaging the Blaxland and told Romeo but left town before he could confirm the story to Alf.

He was later involved in an accident when he drove into Charlie and Brax's vehicle when he went through an intersection and ended up in hospital. He came round to find Bianca by his side and was told Heath had hit him. He recalled seeing Charlie and Brax but Bianca told him she had been in the car with Heath and he realised she'd slept with him again. He insisted on being taken off his painkillers, fearing they were making him hallucinate, but had reason to feel better when he got back with Bianca. He moved into the beach house with her but was bemused both by the fact she no longer seemed to be friends with Charlie and her wanting him to give up his job at the restaurant. He went to buy a new car but was shocked when Bianca tried to get him to buy a family car. When Heath wound him up about it, he ended up buying another bike instead. Bianca convinced him to put it up for sale but he was confused when Brax made him redundant and when he realised Bianca and Charlie had fallen out. Charlie admitted she and Brax had been in the car and Bianca had covered for them and Liam was annoyed she had lied to him. He took his job and bike back and moved out to the caravan park but then surprised Bianca at the surf club and proposed to her, which she accepted. After stopping by the caravan park to say goodbye to Miles, they went to tell his parents in the city.

Bianca discovers she is pregnant and Liam is pleased to be a father again. However when she has an ultrascan, the due date reveals that Heath is the baby's father. When Heath finds out, he takes legal action to allow him access to his child. Bianca and Liam attempt to leave Summer Bay, but when Bianca reveals that she would like to allow Heath to play a part in the baby's life, Liam concludes that she still has feeling for Heath and ends their marriage.

Liam briefly dates Indigo Walker (Samara Weaving) when she separates from Romeo, now her husband. Romeo is angered by this and accuses Liam of betraying their friendship. Liam ends things with Indi and she and Romeo get back together. Liam begins to re-evaluate his life and decides he wants to reconnect with Ash. Romeo also confides in Liam that he is terminally ill, dying from skin cancer and cannot bring himself to tell Indi. Liam and Romeo both decide to leave Summer Bay. Liam says goodbye to Bianca at her and Heath's engagement party, and he also makes his peace with Heath and they part on good terms. Liam and Romeo then ride out of Summer Bay together on Liam's motorbike.

== Reception ==
Holy Soap recall Liam's most memorable moment as being: "A showdown with Aden on the roof of a hotel, which eventually saw Aden talk him down." After Belle befriended Liam, a critic for the Daily Record wrote "but given how good-looking Liam is, who could blame Belle for being even the slightest bit attracted?" The fast pace of their relationship later led the critic to state: "After knowing her for about five minutes, the rock star ditches his wife (who was about to file for divorce) and professes his love for Belle. She is, naturally, aghast and turns Liam down, but eventually (after perhaps 10 more minutes) he wears her down and she agrees to them becoming a couple."

In 2010, it was announced that an episode of Home and Away featuring Liam and Martha had been was deemed too "raunchy" for New Zealand television. The Broadcasting Standards Authority decided to uphold a complaint about a scene between the characters, which saw them sharing a passionate kiss before Martha showed her bra. The scene was said to be too "sexually charged" for its G rating. This was the first time that a complaint about Home and Away's sexual content had been upheld. Ray Meagher later defended the scenes stating he did not understand what all the fuss was about, branding it as tame compared to the scenes involving guns that aired previously.

Holy Soap ran a poll to find out which of the serial's couple were favoured. Liam and Bianca received the fewest votes. Michael Idato of The Sydney Morning Herald said that as Liam, Whitehead was one of the serial's leads who puts in a "robust performance" and credited it as being part of Home and Away's success.
