= The Last Bullet =

- Directed by: Michael Pattinson
- Written by: Brian Trenchard-Smith
- Based on: story by Hiroaki Yoshida
- Produced by: Georgina Pope; Hiroaki Yoshida
- Starring: Jason Donovan; Kōji Tamaki; Charles Tingwell; Danny Roberts
- Production company: Twenty First Century Australia
- Release date: 1995
- Country: Australia
- Language: English

The Last Bullet is a 1995 Australian film about a Japanese soldier and Australian soldier who fight in World War Two.

The film is set in Borneo, towards the end of World War II. It follows Stanley Brennan (Jason Donovan), a nineteen-year old recruit and the only survivor of his patrol when they are killed by a Japanese sniper.

== Cast ==
- Jason Donovan as Stanley Brennan
- Kōji Tamaki as Ichiro Yamamura
- Charles Tingwell as Old Stanley
- Danny Roberts as Williams
