= Alexander Bruszt =

Australian actor and former TV presenter

- Born: Alexander Bruszt; 1983 (age 42–43); Sydney, Australia
- Occupations: Actor; television personality
- Years active: 2009–present
- Height: 1.83 m (6 ft 0 in)

Alexander Bruszt (born 1983) is an Australian actor and former TV presenter. He is best known for being a former presenter of Australian Fox 8 Channel, and for portraying the role of Fynn Thompson on the NBC's soap opera, Days of Our Lives.

== Career ==
Bruszt was previously signed with Chadwick Model. He joined a talent agency at the age of 16, and in 2011, at the age of 28, he went on to land a guest-starring role on Australia's most popular soap opera show "Home and Away" as Sam. In 2010, he appeared in the Ohlala magazine. He has appeared in many commercials including Pepsi Light opposite actress Christie Hayes and Verizon Wireless.

In 2015, Bruszt had joined the cast of Daytime Emmy Award winning soap opera Days of Our Lives in the three-month contract role of Fynn Thompson and first appeared on 12 November 2015. He was one of the 300 actors who had auditioned for the role of Fynn in Arena's online competition for the soap's 'Search for a Star' Contest. Three Australian finalists : Andrew Steel, Alex Bruszt and Tom Dalzell were selected to fly down to Los Angeles for the screen test, in the end, Alex beat out the two finalists winning the role. He had screen tested opposite actress Arianne Zucker during the audition. In early November 2015, it was announced that his contract had been extended and that he would remain with the soap for an unknown period of time. In June 2016, it was announced that he would last air on the show in July 2016.

== Filmography ==
Film
| Year | Title | Role | Notes |
|---|---|---|---|
| 2009 | Overdrawn | Denton | Short film |
| 2009 | Little Black Dress | Bond | Short film |

Television
| Year | Title | Role | Notes |
|---|---|---|---|
| 2011 | Home and Away | Sam | Three episodes |
| 2015 | Days of Our Lives | Fynn Thompson | Series regular; 2015-2016 |
