= David Jones-Roberts =

Australian actor (born 1990)

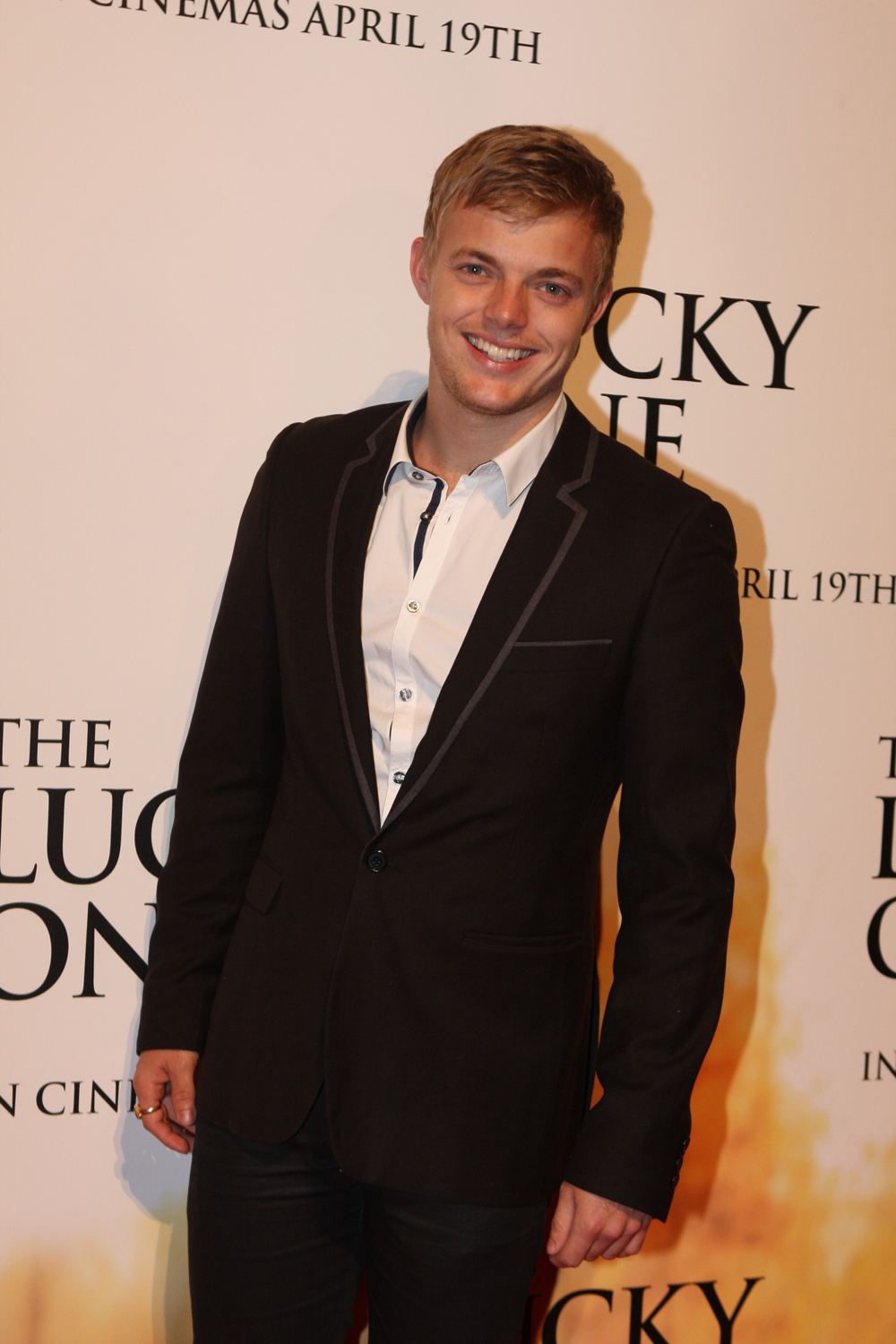
- David Jones-Roberts at The Lucky One World premiere
- Born: 9 April 1990 (age 35); Sydney, Australia
- Occupation: Actor
- Years active: 2006–present
- Family: Danny Roberts (father); Lindsay Neil (mother)

David Jones-Roberts (born 9 April 1990) is an Australian actor, best known for portraying Xavier Austin in the soap opera Home and Away.

== Early and personal life ==
Jones-Roberts was born on 9 April 1990 to actors Danny Roberts and Lindsay Neil. He graduated from the Newtown High School of the Performing Arts. In his spare time, Jones-Roberts does gymnastics, which he has enjoyed from a young age. His father Danny appeared in Home and Away as Ailsa Stewart's younger creepy brother Tony O'Rourke in 1997, and Dennis Harling from 2011 until 2012.

On 15 September 2018, Jones-Roberts was involved in a motorcycle accident on Melrose Avenue, Los Angeles after he crashed into a car and was flung from his bike. Jones-Roberts had to have surgery to repair a ruptured quadriceps tendon and lost mobility in his leg.

== Career ==
Jones-Roberts previously auditioned for numerous other roles in the series (including the roles of Henry Hunter, Lucas Holden, Drew Curtis and Geoff Campbell) in Home and Away. He later successfully auditioned for the role of Xavier Austin. The actor was surfing when his agent told him he had won the role. Jones-Roberts quit Home and Away in 2012 and his final episode was broadcast on 3 July 2012. The actor thanked his fans for their support on Twitter, writing "Just wanted to say thanks to all my fans out there for your continued support throughout the years. Truly wouldn't be where I am without you guys."

== Filmography ==
Year	Title	Role	Notes
1991	Waiting	Baby	Feature film
2006	Wobbegong	Stoner	Short film
2008–13	Home and Away	Xavier Austin	Seasons 21–25 (main role), Season 26 (guest)
2013	Hard	Removalist	Short film
2014	Merry Ex-Mas	Russ	Feature film
2016	Cassidy Way	Trent Polish	Feature film
2019	iZombie	Sneaky Guy	Season 5, Episode 4 – "Dot Zom"
TBA	Swipe Right	James Willis	Upcoming TV series
