= Sid Walker =

- Home and Away character
- Portrayed by: Robert Mammone
- Duration: 2009–2013
- First appearance: 30 July 2009
- Last appearance: 13 November 2013
- Introduced by: Cameron Welsh
In-universe information
- Occupation: Doctor
- Wife: Jody Walker
- Sons: Dexter Walker
- Daughters: Indi Walker; Sasha Bezmel

Sidney Walker is a fictional character from the Australian Seven Network soap opera Home and Away, played by Robert Mammone. He made his first on-screen appearance on 30 July 2009. Sid was originally introduced for a five-week guest stint in 2009. In 2010, Mammone returned to Home and Away and Sid became a regular character. Mammone confirmed his exit in May 2013 and Sid departed on 18 July 2013. He made a brief return from 7 November 2013.

== Character creation and casting ==
In July 2009, it was announced that a new family, the Walkers, would be introduced to Home and Away on a five-week guest contract. Actor Robert Mammone was cast in the role of Doctor Sid Walker, the husband of Jody Walker (Victoria Haralabidou) and the father of Indigo (Samara Weaving) and Dexter (Tom Green). It was revealed that newcomer Charles Cottier would take over the role of Dexter.

== Character development ==
=== Characterisation ===
Channel Five's soap opera reporting website Holy Soap said of the character: "While on the outside he looks like the perfect family man, he's actually a serial love cheat." Seven Network describe Sid as "his own worst enemy". He is an excellent doctor with a "winning bedside manner". Sid has never had trouble charming people – be they patients or co-workers. Seven Network also add that Sid "can’t turn off the charm, especially when it comes to women".

=== Relationships ===
In June 2010, Mammone revealed that Sid was to find a new romance with an existing character following his return. Mammone said "He finds himself quite attracted to a particular person in the Bay and he's quite surprised." He also said that Sid was not looking for romance or "anything to do with matters of the heart" and stated: "His focus is on his children. So when this comes along it's a really pleasant surprise." In July, it was revealed that Sid's new romance is to be with Marilyn Chambers (Emily Symons).

=== Departure ===
In May 2013, Mammone confirmed that he had departed Home and Away after previously hinting about a possible exit. Mammone claimed that he was written out because of "speaking up for the truth too often". He had previously criticised a cancer storyline involving his on-screen son-in-law Romeo Smith (Luke Mitchell) via his Twitter account. Mammone told his followers that he decided to re-write some scenes because they were unrealistic. However, Mammone was dismissed prior to making the public comments.

== Storylines ==
Sid, wife Jody, daughter Indigo and son Dexter move to Summer Bay after Sid finds employment Northern Districts Hospital, covering for Doctor Rachel Armstrong (Amy Mathews) whilst she takes maternity leave. Sid receives a text message from a woman and Jody reads it, thinking that he is having an affair once again. Sid protests his innocence, but Jody refuses to listen to him and decides to end their marriage. He then tells Indigo and Dexter that Jody has returned to Sydney. Sid helps Indigo's friend Nicole Franklin (Tessa James) as she struggles with the death of Belle Taylor (Jessica Tovey). Sid begins to wonder whether Nicole is developing feelings towards him. She thanks him for his help and hugs him, telling him that she has wanted to hug him for a long time. Sid tells her that he does not have feelings for her. Nicole then admits that she is attracted to him, but Sid tells her that nothing can happen between them. She later visits Sid and whilst he comforts her, she kisses him, but he pulls away and Indigo sees them. Nicole tells Sid that she loves him. but he asks her to leave. When Indigo is injured at a party, Jody returns and tells Sid that she is taking Indigo and Dexter with her. Sid then leaves Summer Bay and returns to Sydney.

In June 2010, Indigo and Dexter arrive at Sid's house, where they reveal that they are not moving to Europe with Jody. Sid, Indigo and Dexter return to Summer Bay and move into The Farmhouse. Marilyn Chambers pricks her finger on an old nail and goes to Northern Districts Hospital, where she is apprehensive about meeting Sid after Miles Copeland (Josh Quong Tart) tells her that he dislikes him. After treating Marilyn, Sid's ex-girlfriend Nurse Therese (Rose Ashton) pours coffee over him and he and Marilyn laugh together. Marilyn then gives Sid her business card. Sid later tells Rachel that he is not going to make a complaint against Therese. The nurses begin to disobey Sid and Nurse Julie (Lisa Hayson-Phillips) tells Rachel that they refuse to work with him after what he did to Therese. Sid tells Julie that personal matters should not affect professional conduct, but she refuses to listen. When patient Hayley Doven (Bonnie Sveen) begins to hemorrhage after giving birth, Sid shouts at the nurses to help him and they agree. The nurses begin to respect Sid after he tries to save Hayley's life. Sid arranges a date with Marilyn. When Sid returns home, Nurse Veronica (Sophie Katinis) arrives and they sleep together. Romeo Smith (Luke Mitchell) tells Marilyn that Sid slept with Veronica, leaving Marilyn surprised. Marilyn confronts Sid and he tells her that he is not in another relationship. During their date, Marilyn tells Sid that she believes she is going to die and Sid is supportive. Sid takes Marilyn home and they kiss. Marilyn then invites Sid to stay the night. They later begin a relationship.

Marilyn's friend Mitzy Fraser (Helen Dallimore) who is a psychic arrives and tells Sid that she knows when Marilyn is going to die. Sid refuses to believe Mitzy's prediction, which leaves Marilyn disappointed and she asks him to leave. Sid and Marilyn reconcile and he tries to accept Mitzy's prediction. Mitzy kisses Dexter to show how he is pushing his feelings onto Marilyn and Sid berates her. When Mitzy tells Marilyn that she is going to die earlier than predicted, Marilyn tells Sid. He tells her that Mitzy is a bad person to have in her life. Marilyn is upset that Sid is not tolerating Mitzy and her beliefs. Mitzy reveals that she has cancer, which makes Sid think that she told Marilyn about her prediction so she had someone else to experience dying with. Mitzy collapses and is rushed to hospital where Sid discovers she has an inoperable brain tumour and may only have weeks to live. Sid confronts her, convinced that she made up the prediction of Marilyn's death, leaving Mitzy furious. He then asks another doctor to take on Mitzy's case. Mitzy later has a stroke and is rushed to hospital, where she tells Marilyn that she lied about the prediction of her death. She then tells Sid that she did not lie and dies. Sid asks Marilyn to move in with him and she agrees. He admits to Marilyn that Mitzy lied and that her prediction is true, leaving her shocked. On the day Mitzy predicted Marilyn will die, Marilyn notices a baby in a pushchair rolling off the wharf and into the sea. She jumps into the sea to save the drowning baby and passes the pushchair to the baby's mother. Marilyn then becomes exhausted and struggles to stay afloat. Sid rescues her from the sea and revives her. Marilyn is taken to hospital where she recovers.

When Nicole discovers she is pregnant by Penn Graham (Christian Clark), Marilyn tells Sid that she has agreed to adopt Nicole's baby when it is born. Sid is hesitant, but later agrees to the adoption after Marilyn discovers that she is unable to have children.

== Reception ==
In August 2011, Inside Soap readers voted Sid their least favourite doctor in soap opera.
