= Summer Bay =

Fictional coastal town

- Home and Away location
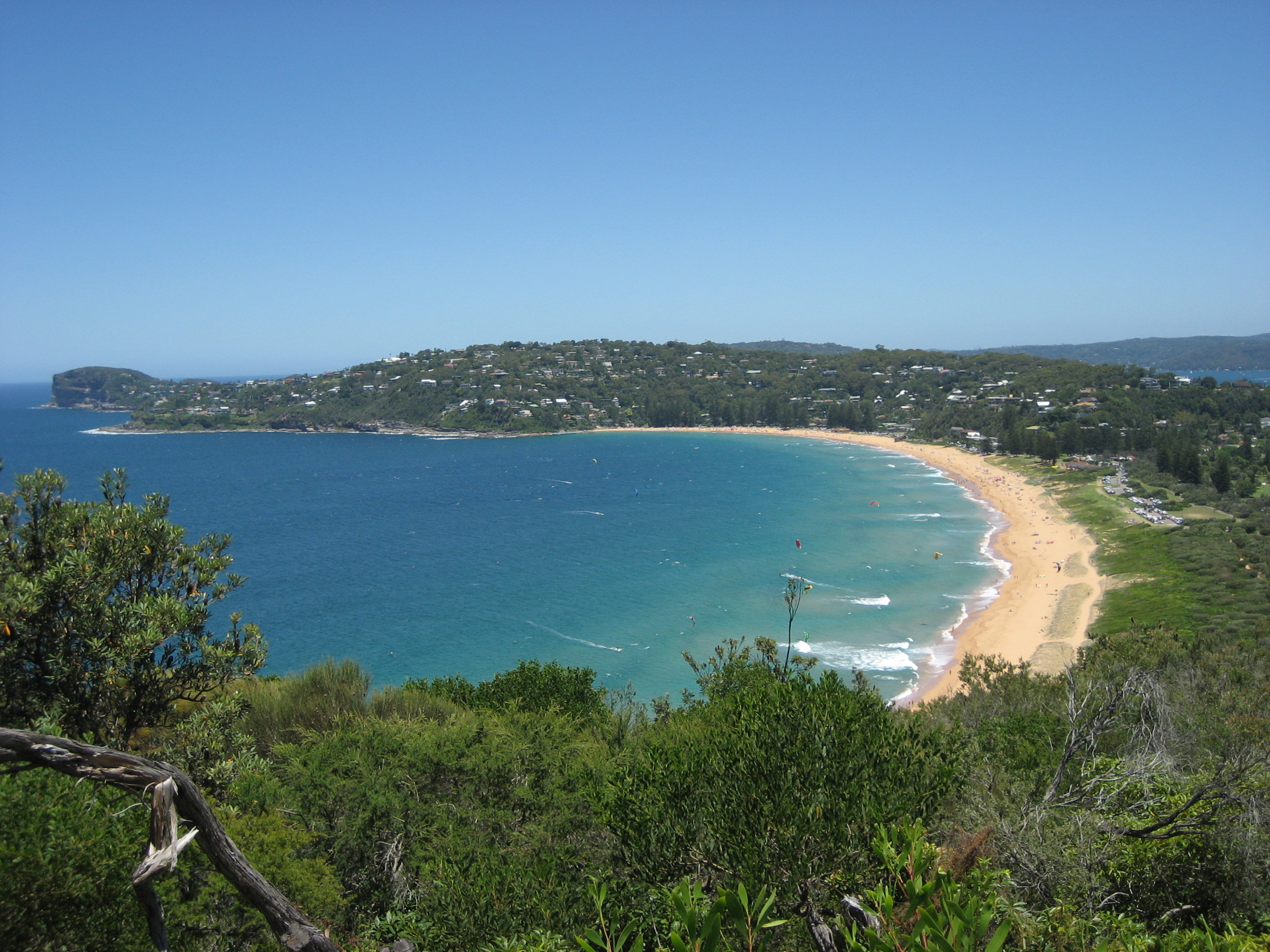
- Palm Beach, Sydney, where Home and Away exterior shots are filmed
- Genre: Soap opera

In-universe information
- Type: Fictional township
- Locations: Summer Bay Surf Life Saving Club; Pier Diner; Salt; Gelato; Summer Bay High School; Summer Bay Caravan Park

Summer Bay is the fictional coastal town featured in the Australian soap opera, Home and Away, located in rural coastal New South Wales. Palm Beach, the northernmost beach in Sydney, is used for the show's exterior scenes to depict the Bay. Between 2010 and 2014, the Lane Cove River Tourist Park in Macquarie Park was used as the location for filming of scenes involving the Summer Bay Caravan Park.

== Locations in Summer Bay ==
=== Summer Bay Surf Lifesaving Club ===
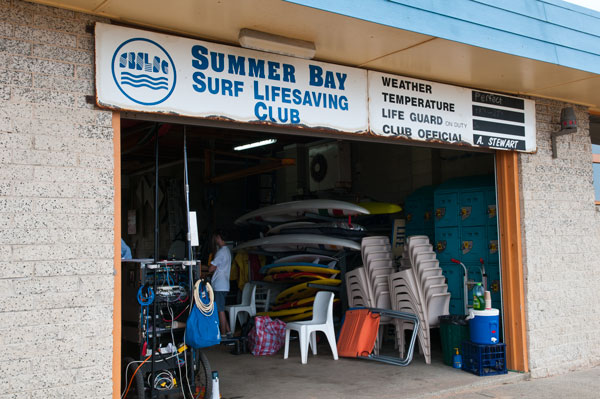
The Summer Bay Surf Lifesaving Club set.

As with many real life Australian beaches Summer Bay has its own Surf and Lifesaving Centre (SLSC). It was first seen on screen in 1989. Over the years as well as serving its purpose as a centre for sea and land rescues it has been a place for the young people of the Bay to relax and socialise. Town meetings are often held in the Surf Club. It has also been used as a polling station and a private party/formal venue and has housed various food outlets, most notably the ill-fated Bonza Burger in 1998. Several characters have been trained as lifeguards over the years and surf competitions take place occasionally. The club has undergone renovations in 1992, 1996, 2004, 2010, and 2023, respectively.

==== Salt ====
Salt (previously Angelo's) is a restaurant located upstairs in the renovated SLSC. It replaces Noah's Bar as the only licensed premises in Summer Bay. It was initially a business venture by Angelo Rosetta after he was discharged from the Police force and it was always his dream to own his own restaurant after growing up with his parents running a restaurant. Indi Walker worked there, but was fired by Angelo after she sold alcohol to Ruby Buckton without his permission. Darryl Braxton buys into the business and helps turn it into a successful pizza restaurant. Angelo and Darryl employ Xavier Austin and Casey Braxton to deliver pizza. Darryl eventually buys Angelo out after Angelo left the Bay in 2011. Heath briefly works there in 2012, and so does Liam Murphy. Indi returned working there briefly in 2012, but left. Xavier left the job in 2012, Kyle started working there in late 2012. Casey and Heath left their jobs in early 2013, to start working at the Body & Soul gym. Liam was then fired by Brax for stealing money at the restaurant. Tamara Kingsley worked there in 2013, but left in 2014 to return home to her family. Matt works there as a pizza deliverer in 2014. Josh Barrett works there as a pizza deliverer in 2014, but left in 2016 to go to university. Martin Ashford works there in late 2014. Brax left the job in 2015, while on the run. Then, Maddy Osborne started working there in mid 2015. In 2016, Ash left the job to start his own company and Kyle left the job after being sent to jail. Matt left the job in 2016 and Maddy leaves the bay on the same year. After Ricky leaves the Bay, Phoebe is placed in charge and Brody Morgan becomes the new chef. He later buys the restaurant and renames it Salt. He employs various Bay residents as waiting staff. Brody briefly loses the restaurant after he has to sell it to fund his time in rehab, but buys it back a few months later. The restaurant is sold to Mackenzie Booth (Emily Weir) following Brody's departure. That same year, Ryder Jackson starts working at the restaurant, but he got fired by Mackenzie in 2021, but later rehired again a few months later. Chloe Anderson starts working there, but was fired by Mackenzie after she gets into feud with Chloe's mother, Mia Anderson and the Parata family, and even fired Ryder, later rehires him weeks later.

==== JP's Juice Bar ====
JP's Juice Bar (previously Noah's Bar and Gelato) is a small kiosk selling gelato, juices and smoothies located downstairs in the SLSC. The set was originally known as Noah's Bar when it was established in 2005. Producer Julie McGauran said the location would be "a new get-together area for the younger residents during the day and will attract the older members of the Bay at night when it reopens as a bar." Noting that it would a place for adult issues to be discussed, McGauran called the set versatile. The kiosk was later renamed Gelato. There was also a small workout area tucked in the corner replacing Summer Bay Super Bods, as well as a boutique selling magazines and surf, skateboard and fashion items and a pool table in the centre of the area. The kiosk is owned and run by John Palmer. Alf Stewart, Dallas Phillips and VJ Patterson have all worked there. Alf's grandson Ryder Jackson later replaced VJ. The kiosk underwent a revamp in 2023 and is renamed JP's Juice Bar.

==== Summer Bay Fit ====
Summer Bay Fit (previously Summer Bay Body & Soul is a gym located downstairs in the Surf Club. It is initially owned by Romeo Smith and Indigo Walker. Shortly after it opened in March 2013, Romeo departed the Bay, leaving Indi to run the business alone. She left the business to Casey and Heath after she departed in November 2013. Spencer Harrington worked as an employee in 2013, and left to return home in 2015. Andy started to work there in early 2014, so he could pay for his brother Josh Barrett's school bills. Heath left in 2014 to move to the city with his family. Casey dies in late 2014 and Brax bought the gym after his death. Maddy Osborne works there until late 2014, but was fired by Brax for stealing the business' money for buying new clothes and shoes. Billie Ashford works there in early 2015, but left to recover her burns. But she returned to the job in 2016. After Casey's death in 2014, his brother Darryl Braxton bought the gym in his memory. In 2016, Billie was raped by Irene Roberts long lost son, Mick Jennings during the end of the night shift. Kyle Braxton sells the gym. Andy leaves to go on the run, and left Billie to run the business alone, until she goes to maternity leave. In 2018, Willow Harris starts working, and is the only employee ever since. Mason Morgan works there until he gets his internship at the hospital. The gym has been owned by Robbo since 2018. After Robbo dies in 2020, he left the business to his wife, Jasmine. In 2021, Jasmine sold the gym to Ari Parata and Mia Anderson.

==== Manta Ray Boards ====
Manta Ray Boards (previously Ben's Boards) is a surfboard and surfing accessories shop. It was originally owned and run by Ben Astoni (Rohan Nichol), with the help of Dean Thompson (Patrick O'Connor). Following Ben's departure from the Bay, he leaves the business to Dean. In August 2021, Ryder Jackson takes over the business temporarily while Dean recovers his injuries from a car accident, but later quits and Nikau Parata takes over. Dean's girlfriend, Ziggy Astoni helps out with surfing lessons. Following the departures of Dean and Ziggy, Mali Hudson took over the business and renamed it Manta Ray Boards as part of a revamp of the Surf Club in the show.

=== Pier Diner ===
The Pier Diner (previously Bayside Diner and Beachside Diner) is a restaurant used by the local residents and tourists. It is connected to the Summer Bay Pier. The Diner is currently owned by Leah Patterson-Baker and Irene Roberts. The Boathouse in Palm Beach is used for exterior filming of the Diner and Alf Stewart's bait shop, while interior scenes are filmed at Technology Park in Redfern. In June 2021, a report in the Manly Daily confirmed that The Boathouse was set to be demolished to make way for a new café on the site. A tenant of The Boathouse said Home and Away would have to carry out some prerecording or write a dramatic storyline, such as "some sort of explosion" to explain why the bait shop no longer exists. This led writers to create the Pier Diner Coffee Cart, a new outdoor location while the redevelopment took place.

The original diner was the Bayside Diner run by Bobby Simpson and Ailsa Stewart and later Ailsa's husband Alf. For a while this diner included a Beauty Salon set up in a back room, this was run by Marilyn Fisher. This Diner was given a makeover in 1998 when it was revealed a Bonza Burger outlet was being set up in Summer Bay.

In 2000, the kitchen of the Bayside was badly damaged by fire, due to Colleen Smart mistakenly pouring water onto the flames of a chip-pan fire, making it worse and instead of repairing the building Alf and Ailsa decided to relocate the diner to an existing building in front of the beach, subsequently the diner became known as The Beachside Diner. Prior to the original diner fire Alf and Ailsa's home had been destroyed by a landslide and fire, as the new diner had a flat attached upstairs this is where Alf and Ailsa lived with their son Duncan, and Mitch McColl. Alf continued to live here following Ailsa's death. Alf sold his share of the business to Irene Roberts in 2004 but continued to live in the flat until 2006, when he moved back into Summer Bay House and the flat became home to many other Summer Bay residents for the next few years.

In 2008, the structure of The Beachside Diner became unsafe as result of aftershocks from the 1996 earthquake and the building was condemned. The Diner was relocated to its current location as The Pier Diner; originally this Diner was located in a room to the left of the Kitchen which was central to the building with a room to the right being used as a youth centre known as The Den, this was started by Leah as a tribute to her late husband Dan. As The Den struggled to survive financially Leah made a decision to close The Den with The Pier Diner then moving to the location of The Den. The room used for the original Pier Diner was then used only as an additional store room. Belle Taylor and Aden Jefferies previously worked at the Diner before Belle's death and Aden's departure. Roman Harris, who owned a third of the business also left the Bay to serve a prison sentence.

On Australia Day 2010 a riot took place outside the Diner, which resulted in the Diner being badly damaged by fire. The Diner was given a major makeover inside with there now being two sets of sliding glass doors leading onto a terraced area overlooking the pier and one set of sliding glass doors on the opposite wall reflecting the real life location of the Pier Diner. The kitchen is now located to the left of the building and toilets on the right with the dining area central to the building, scenes can be filmed facing all walls as it is a 4-walled set unlike the previous set.

Leah scales back her work as she is employed at Summer Bay High School, however, she does some casual shifts and continues to own her half of the diner. Chris Harrington (Johnny Ruffo) unintentionally poisons some diners, as well as Alf and Leah, when he uses Death cap mushrooms in a risotto. Irene considers closing the diner permanently when there are no customers, but business soon picks up. Employees since then have included Olivia Fraser Richards, Skye Peters, Brody Morgan, Gemma Parata and Chloe Anderson.

=== Summer Bay High School ===
The local co-ed high school for students aged 12–18. It is also used as a shelter in extreme weather conditions such as cyclones and has been the scene of a hostage situation. During Donald Fisher's reign as principal, Adult Evening classes were often held. The school was rebuilt in 1996 following a major earthquake that occurred in Summer Bay that year. In 2011, a storm occurred and did a great deal of damage, rendering the building unsafe. The school was rebuilt at the start of the 2012 school year. Most of the younger characters attend the school, and many of the adult characters have worked there.

=== Other locations in Summer Bay ===
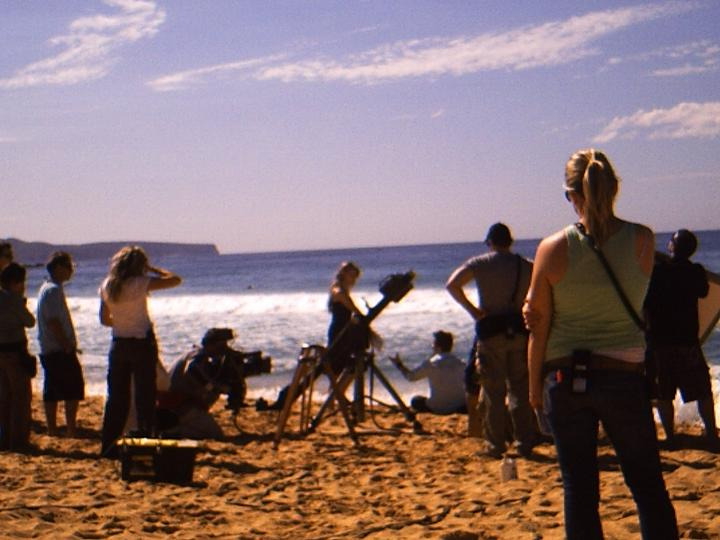
Indiana Evans, Mark Furze and the crew during filming

- The Bait Shop – The local bait shop is owned by Alf Stewart (Ray Meagher). It was intended to be a business venture between Alf and his grandson Ric Dalby, but Ric moved to university instead. Various Bay residents have worked at the Bait Shop over the years, including Hugo Austin (Bernard Curry), Harvey Ryan (Marcus Graham), Denny Miller (Jessica Grace Smith), Hunter King (Scott Lee), Justin Morgan (James Stewart), and Nikau Parata (Kawakawa Fox-Reo). In 2025, the location of the set was moved to the Caravan Park and given a makeover.
- Summer Bay Auto – The garage was set up by Andy Barrett (Tai Hara) and Martin Ashford (George Mason), with the help of Katarina Chapman (Pia Miller). Andy and Ash take on Matt Page (Alec Snow) as their apprentice mechanic. The garage was trashed on the orders of Dylan Carter (Jeremy Lindsay Taylor). In July 2016, Andy left Summer Bay on the run and left Ash to run the business alone. Justin tried to find a job there, but left when he found that Ash is the owner, after Justin had a fight with Ash on his arrival to Summer Bay. But Justin returned and takes the job. He later becomes the owner of the auto after Ash left. Ziggy Astoni starts working there as an apprentice in 2017 and Dean Thompson works there in 2018 but left to start working at Ben's Boards a year later. In 2021, Theo Poulos starts working there.
- The Farm – Previously owned by Bruce Campbell – the grandfather of Geoff Campbell and Annie Campbell. In March 2009 Martha Mackenzie had bought the farm with the money from her husband Jack Holden after his death in honour of him. Martha sold the farm to her grandfather Alf Stewart in June 2010 before going on the run with Hugo Austin. Later in the year Sid Walker started renting the property, then a few months later bought the farm off of Alf and now lives there with his daughters Indigo and Sasha and son Dexter. Sid later left it to his kids with Dex moving into his room and having his girlfriend April move in. When the Walker family departed in 2013, they started renting it out to the Maguire Family and they moved in during the 2013 finale. In 2017, the Astoni Family moves in.
- The Beach – The beach is an important part of the Bay and several major story lines have revolved around it. It is the main outdoor location, often used for casual encounters between characters. It also serves to showcase the looks of the cast, who are often seen wearing beachwear. There is a small salt-water swimming pool – referred to locally as the Ocean Pool – at one end of the beach which is used occasionally.
- The Lighthouse – The Lighthouse is mentioned as being located at Stewart's Point, and appears in establishing shots.
- St. James Church – The local Anglican Church is often used for weddings and funerals. Previous Ministers have included Reverend Flowers, Reverend John Hall and Elijah Johnson.
- The Library – The Library is somewhere around in Summer Bay, and students from Summer Bay High are occasionally mentioned as going there to study. However, it has never been seen on-screen.
- Yabbie Creek Primary School – The closest Primary school situated in the neighbouring town of Yabbie Creek. It is the local primary school for Summer Bay residents after the closure of Summer Bay Primary School. Previous students of Summer Bay Primary include Sally Fletcher, Sam Marshall, Duncan Stewart, Christopher Fletcher, Rachel McGregor. Previous students of Yabbie Creek Primary School include Ryan Baker, VJ Patterson and for a short time, Darcy Callahan and Lily Smith.

== Former locations ==
- Hogan's General Store (1988–89) – The local store was originally owned by Bobby Simpson's grandparents until they sold it to Ailsa Hogan in 1987, shortly after she moved to town and they moved away. Food was originally served on the premises but ceased with the opening of the Bayside Diner. The following year, Ailsa sold the store to her sister-in-law, Celia Stewart before temporarily leaving town. The store was later destroyed in an arson attack by Brian "Dodge" Forbes, which resulted in the death of Philip Matheson, who was living on the premises at the time. Celia then merged with Alf's liquor store until the insurance settlement came in for a new store which they ran together.
- The Stewart Store (1989–91) – Alf and Celia ran this together until Celia left for Africa in 1990. Alf took over sole responsibility until 1991 when the store was later sold due to financial problems, and he and Ailsa went into business in their own store. This store was bigger and resembled a mini-market.
- The Stewart Store (1991–96) – Alf and Ailsa purchased the store in mid-1991 and this became the main grocery shop in Summer Bay until 1996 when it was destroyed in a major earthquake.
- Sarah McKay Drop-in Center (1999–2004) – Named after a teenage girl identified as Sarah McKay who was found dead in a sewer drain. Mitch McColl and the Summer Bay community decided to start up a Drop-in Center. The Drop-in Center was run by Shelley Sutherland with several other volunteers. In 2004, the Drop-in Center was burnt to the ground.
- Fisher Houses (1988–1995) – Don Fisher's house, this house in the pilot episode was suggested to be located next door to the Summer Bay Caravan park. In 1992, Don sold the house to Julia Bowman and her daughter Meg and moved to a new residence; his old house not being seen again after Julia Bowman left town a few months later following Meg's death from leukaemia. In 1995, the second house was destroyed by fire when a major bush fire swept through Summer Bay.
- The Norfolk Boat Shed (1990–95, 2003) – Michael Ross bought the Norfolk Boat Shed in 1990 and moved to Summer Bay. As well as providing employment for various Summer Bay residents, it was where Michael lived during his temporary split from Pippa in 1994/1995. The Rosses sold the boat shed to Rob Storey in 1995. It and Rob quietly vanished from sight later that year, though Rob was referred to as still living in town for the next four years. It made a brief return in 2003 when it was burned down.

== Neighbourhood ==
=== Summer Bay House ===
The House was originally owned by Alf Stewart, who lived there with his wife Martha and daughter, Roo. In 1985, Martha was reported to have drowned in a boating accident and Alf and Roo remained in the house until 1988 when Alf sold the property and the Caravan park that came with it to Tom and Pippa Fletcher who had moved from the city with their foster children. The house became a foster home for various kids over the years. Tom died in 1990 and Pippa married Michael Ross a year later and he moved in. Michael drowned in a flood in 1996 and Pippa was widowed again.

Two years later Pippa decided to move with new partner, Ian Routledge to The Carrington Ranges and let Travis and Rebecca Nash take over the tenancy on the house and the care of the remaining foster children who opted to stay behind, Sam Marshall, Tiegan Brook and Justine Welles.

Sally Fletcher, Pippa's adoptive daughter felt like her home was not hers anymore and moved in with Jesse McGregor and Vinnie Patterson at Travis' house. Within a year, Travis and Rebecca moved to Canada, Sam had moved in with Donald Fisher and Tiegan had joined Pippa in the Carrington Ranges and the house was now occupied by Travis' brother, Joel and his wife Natalie and their children Tom and Gypsy. During the Nashes tenure they took in Peta Janossi and Rachel McGregor. They eventually bought the house and caravan park from Pippa along with Alf Stewart and Colleen Smart.

In 2000, the family had ultimately split up and Joel sold the house. The Sutherland Family had purchased it and lived there for four years. The family merged with the Hunters when Rhys Sutherland married local widow Beth Hunter. The marriage didn't last as Rhys went back to his ex-wife Shelley. Beth, not feeling comfortable in Rhys' home, elected to house swap with Flynn Saunders and Sally Fletcher, selling the adjoining Caravan Park as a separate entity. In 2005, it was revealed Pippa had purchased the Caravan Park from Tasha Andrews for Sally and Flynn and they took in local teenagers, Ric Dalby and Cassie Turner.

In 2006, Belle Taylor arrived in the Bay and secretly camped at the house with Ric, she moved out after she was caught. After Flynn's death in 2006, Alf moved back in. Sally left the Bay in April 2008 and let her long-lost twin brother, Miles Copeland take over the running of the house and caravan park. Ric's girlfriend, Matilda Hunter, who had lived there previously with her family also moved back in. Jai Fernandez, an orphaned youth Miles had met in Phuket came to live with them.

After Ric and Matilda moved to Perth together, Kirsty Sutherland, Matilda's former stepsister and her son moved into the house. Nicole Franklin, moved in with Miles after her father Roman Harris left Summer Bay in June 2009. In September 2009 Jai's friend from when he lived in a foster home Romeo Smith came to stay and live in the Bay. In October 2009 Jai had left Summer Bay with Annie Campbell to go to Japan on a student exchange programme. A week after Jai had left Kirsty and Ollie left Summer Bay with her mother Shelly after she had a miscarriage with her and Miles' baby. The recurring character of Rabbit, who was Miles Copeland's dead daughter briefly stayed in the house in early 2010, this went unnoticed by the others as Miles could only see her. Marilyn Chambers moved in when she returned to the Bay. Alf's daughter Roo (Georgie Parker) returned to Summer Bay in October 2010 moving into the house, after twenty years in New York City. Romeo moved out after marrying Indigo Walker and Miles left to join Sally in Phuket in late 2011. Roo and her husband foster Spencer Harrington (Andrew Morley) and Maddy Osborne (Kassandra Clementi). Sally and Pippa briefly stayed in the house in 2013, as did Josh Barrett (Jackson Gallagher). Harvey Ryan moved out of the house after separating from Roo in 2014, Spencer returned to the house after his break-up with Sasha Bezmel. Then left again in May 2014. Marilyn Chambers moved out in October 2014 after marrying John Palmer. Leah, Zac, VJ, Oscar and Evelyn move into the house after Leah's house was burnt down by Hunter King. Roo moves out of the house to live with her new boyfriend, James Edmunds (Myles Pollard). The following year, Maddy also moves out and Oscar dies. Evie moves out in 2016 to move back into the Farmhouse, and Billie Ashford moves in. Billie gives birth to a daughter Luc Patterson and dies days later. Zac moves out after his divorce with Leah. In October, Alf's grandson Ryder Jackson arrives in Summer Bay and moves in. VJ and Luc departed Summer Bay in 2017. In 2020, Martha moves back in after remarrying Alf. Marilyn moves back in to the house in 2020 after separating from John and moving out of 33 Saxton Avenue.

=== Summer Bay Caravan Park ===
Scenes for the caravan park have been shot at the Jackaroo Ranch in Kenthurst since the show began airing in 1988. The caravan park and house were severely damaged during a bush fire in 2002, causing production to move. Other filming locations for the caravan park included the Lane Cove River Tourist Park and Waratah Park Earth Sanctuary in Duffys Forest. The caravan park set moved back to the Jackaroo Ranch following a rebuild, and returned to screens in 2015. Sarah Thomas of The Sun-Herald wrote that the caravan park has been "a pillar of the community since Home & Away's beginnings in 1988." Thomas also described the park as "a fictional budget-friendly holiday spot".

The Park, like the house, was owned by Alf. Following the supposed death of his wife Martha, Alf let the condition of the park slide and eventually sold it to Tom and Pippa Fletcher who inherited full-time tenants Floss and Neville McPhee who lived in their circus caravan until March 1989, but their van remained in the park until 1991 when Pippa decided she needed to make space for additional caravans. Bobby Simpson lived in a caravan until moving into the house. Lance Smart also rented a van until he purchased a mobile home further up the park following a lottery win and was joined by Martin Dibble and they lived there for two years. They were joined by Marilyn Chambers for a while, but following their departures, she moved out. The home was rarely seen on screen for the next few years and when it was briefly shown in 1995 when Marilyn returned the steps had been removed. Lance's mother Colleen returned in 1997 to clean out the home for sale but stayed for the next fifteen years. In 2013, Casey Braxton stayed for a while after his break-up with his girlfriend, Tamara Kingsley. In 2014, Denny Miller stayed since she arrived to the Bay, but left in July and moved to the Farmhouse with her family. Matt later moved to the Caravan Park after Hunter King burnt Leah's house down. In October 2015, Hunter moved in the Caravan Park after he found out his mother's affair with Matt, but in February 2016, Hunter left the Caravan Park after he confess that he burnt Leah's house, but returned. In February 2016, Maddy moves in with her new boyfriend, Matt. During the same month, Matt and Maddy move out of the Caravan Park. During episodes broadcast on 5 May 2016, the Caravan Park was the setting for an explosion that killed Oscar MacGuire (Jake Speer) and Hannah Wilson (Cassie Horwath), and injured many other characters. In 2021, Cash Newman and his sister Felicity Newman moves into the caravan park after they got evicted from their home.

=== 12 James Street ===
12 James Street (originally 26 Bailey Street, later 6 James Street) was originally owned by Travis Nash, who grew up in the house with his brother Joel, and inherited it after their father, Jack's death. The house first seen on screen in 1995. Leah Patterson-Baker moved into the house shortly after arriving in the Bay. In July 2015, it was intentionally burnt down by Hunter King (Scott Lee).

=== 33 Saxon Avenue ===
The house has been home to John Palmer (Shane Withington) since 2010. He initially moved in with his partner, and later wife, Gina Austin (Sonia Todd) and her son Xavier Austin (David Jones-Roberts). Four years later, Marilyn Chambers (Emily Symons) moves in and she and John marry. Following the couple's separation, which aired in 2020, Marilyn moves out to live with the Stewarts.

=== 55 Saxon Avenue ===
The house was first seen in 1998 when Sean Ellis (Mark Gerber) and his daughter move in. Throughout the 2000s, it was known for being a share house with various characters staying there, including James Fraser (Michael Piccirilli), Harry Reynolds (Justin Melvey), Shauna Bradley (Kylie Watson), Leah Patterson (Ada Nicodemou), and Charlotte Adams (Stephanie Chaves-Jacobsen). Sally Fletcher (Kate Ritchie) and Flynn Saunders (Martin Dingle-Wall) made it their marital home, and had an annexe built for Flynn's surgery. They later moved into Summer Bay House after swapping with the newly introduced Hunter family. The annexe was later turned into living space when Beth Hunter (Clarissa House) established a relationship with Tony Holden (Jon Sivewright). From 2011 until 2016, the house was home to the Braxton family and their friends. It was reintroduced in 2022 when Eden Fowler (Stephanie Panozzo), Remi Carter (Adam Rowland) and Kirby Aramoana (Angelina Thomson) rent it.

=== 59 Saxon Avenue ===
The house was introduced to the show in 2020 following the arrival of the Parata family – Ari Parata (Rob Kipa-Williams), Tane Parata (Ethan Browne), Nikau Parata (Kawakawa Fox-Reo), and Gemma Parata (Bree Peters). After renting the home, the family dig a Hāngī, a Māori pit oven, in the back garden and host a party for their friends and neighbours, however, the party ends when John Palmer (Shane Withington) has a stroke.

=== Beach House ===
This property located on Beach Road was previously owned by Ernie Jacobs, who rented it to Marilyn Chambers, Adam Cameron and Matt Wilson. Marilyn bought the property outright in 1991 and sold it to Greg and Bobby, following her departure the next year. After Bobby's death, Greg put the house up for sale and Irene Roberts purchased it at auction in 1994 and remained living there until 2025 when she sold the house to Sergerant David Langham. Originally the house had three bedrooms but a fourth was added. Skye Peters moved in temporarily while her foster father John Palmer left to care for his wife overseas. Skye moved out after John returned home. Hunter moves in during 2017. In 2018, Jasmine Delaney and Willow Harris moves in. In 2019, Bella Nixon moves in briefly, before moving back in with her brother Colby Thorne. In 2021, Willow departed the Bay and move to Queensland.

=== The Farmhouse ===
The Farmhouse address is 17 Ferry Road. The farm is situated within driving distance of the Bay and a local bus service is frequently used. The property was first owned by Bruce Campbell (Chris Haywood), who lives there with his grandchildren Annie Campbell (Charlotte Best) and Geoff Campbell (Lincoln Lewis). Geoff and Annie eventually move to the Beach House and leave Bruce on his own until his death. Two years later, Martha MacKenzie (Jodi Gordon) buys the property. The Walker family purchase the farm in 2010. After they depart in 2013, Zac MacGuire (Charlie Clausen), Hannah Wilson (Cassie Howarth) and their niece and nephew, Evelyn (Philippa Northeast) and Oscar MacGuire (Jake Speer) move in. Denny Miller (Jessica Grace Smith) moves in during the following year. Zac moves out when his relationship with Hannah becomes strained. In 2015, Evelyn and Oscar moved out and Phoebe Nicholson and Katarina Chapman moved in. Phoebe's boyfriend, Martin Ashford, briefly moves in after Denny leaves. His sister, Billie Ashford later moves in, while Hannah dies from a head injury sustained during the explosion at the Caravan Park. Justin Morgan briefly moves in after his siblings kick him out of their house. Evie moves back in after finding Summer Bay house too crowded, while Billie moves out to live with her fiancé VJ Patterson and his family. After the house is sold, Phoebe moves in with her fiancé Justin Morgan. Evelyn leaves to live and work in Vietnam. The Astoni family, consisting of Ben Astoni (Rohan Nichol), his wife Maggie (Kestie Morassi), and their two daughters, Ziggy (Sophie Dillman) and Coco (Anna Cocquerel), move into the house in 2017. Brody Morgan (Jackson Heywood) moves in after he married Ziggy, but he and Ziggy later move out and move into Brody's place. Coco left to go to boarding school in Cairns and Ziggy moves back in after she finds out that Brody was having an affair with Simone Bedford. In 2020, Ziggy moves out to live with her boyfriend Dean Thompson. On that same year, Ben moves out after separating with Maggie. They later reconcile and decided to move to Italy to have a fresh start. Ziggy moves back in after she and Dean split and later invites Mackenzie Booth (Emily Weir) to move in. But in 2021, Mackenzie moves out after Ziggy kicks her out, for kissing her new boyfriend, Tane Parata. Tane then moves in, but later moved out a few months later after he and Ziggy breaks up. Dean, who got back with Ziggy, moves in to recover his injuries from a car accident. Mackenzie moves in temporarily to take care of Dean when Ziggy was away, and move out after Ziggy returns.

=== Pier flat ===
This property is located above the Pier Diner in Summer Bay. It was first seen in August 2015 when Charlotte King (Erika Heynatz) and her son Hunter (Scott Lee) moved in. Hunter moves out a couple of months later, while Charlotte leaves the flat after the police come to arrest her for murder. The next occupants are Roo Stewart (Georgie Parker), Maddy Osborne (Kassandra Clementi) and Matt Page (Alec Snow). In May 2016, Maddy departs the Bay. Matt's sister Eloise Page (Darcey Wilson) runs away from her aunt and Roo and Matt allow her to live with them. Matt and Elly move to Vietnam with Evelyn MacGuire. Roo moves back to the Summer bay house. Kat Chapman (Pia Miller) and Martin Ashford (George Mason) move in, after Ash fails to win custody of Luc Patterson. Ash's brother Patrick Stanwood (Luke McKenzie) briefly stays with them. Raffy Morrison (Olivia Deeble) also stays briefly, but leaves after Kat and Ash break up and Kat moves out. Ash leaves when he cannot afford to pay the rent himself. Kat moves back in with Scarlett Snow (Tania Nolan), until Scarlett leaves Summer Bay with her husband. Robbo (Jake Ryan) moves in with Kat. But she dies in a car crash and he goes on the run, before being arrested. Senior Constable Colby Thorne (Tim Franklin) rents the flat and allows Robbo to stay with him. Dean Thompson (Patrick O'Connor) and Willow Harris (Sarah Roberts) move in after they get kicked out of the caravan park, but Willow leaves when she breaks up with Dean. Colby's sister, Bella Nixon moves in and Chelsea Campbell moves in after she married Colby, but soon leaves. In 2020, Dean's girlfriend Ziggy Astoni moves in, but moves out after they split. Dean's new girlfriend Amber Simmons and their son Jai Simmons moves in, but Amber and Jai moves out and depart the Bay after Dean and Amber split. Mackenzie moves in after being kicked out of the Farmhouse by Ziggy and Bella moves back in after breaking up with Nikau Parata.

=== 13 Healey Road ===
13 Healey Road is owned by the Morgan family, who move in during May 2016. Tori Morgan (Penny McNamee) is the first to arrive, and is followed by her three brothers, Justin (James Stewart), Brody (Jackson Heywood) and Mason Morgan (Orpheus Pledger) follow in June. In November, their half-sister, Raffy Morrison (Olivia Deeble) moves in with them, after her cousin, Hope Morrison (Jessica Falkholt), is sent to prison. Justin's fiancée Phoebe Nicholson (Isabella Giovinazzo) moves in briefly before she leaves for a tour of the United States. Raffy goes to live with John Palmer (Shane Withington) and Marilyn Chambers (Emily Symons) when Brody's drug addiction grows worse, and the move is later made permanent until her accident. Brody moves out to live with his wife Ziggy Astoni (Sophie Dillman), while Justin invites Willow to stay when she becomes homeless. Brody and Ziggy move into the cottage behind the house. Raffy returns after being diagnosed with epilepsy in 2018, and when Jett James stays with John and Marilyn. Brody and Raffy both depart Summer Bay, and Mason dies. Leah moves in as her relationship with Justin develops. Christian Green moves in after dating Tori, but moves out after their break up. But he later moves back in after getting back with Tori. In 2021, Leah's nephew, Theo Poulos moves in and Tori and Christian departs the Bay and moves to London.

=== 8 Ebbons Hill Road Mansion ===
Was owned by Amanda Vale after she inherited her late husband Graham Walters' estate. The mansion also features an outdoor pool. After Amanda leaves Summer Bay, she rents it out to Jazz Curtis. It is burnt down by fire after Jazz lights a candle which falls down while she is sleeping. The damage is beyond repair and the house has to be demolished.

== Locations outside Summer Bay ==
=== Mangrove River ===
Mangrove River is a neighbouring suburb to Summer Bay, often mentioned in the earlier years of the programme. Its first mention came in 1989 when Tom Fletcher and Alf Stewart were hospitalised there after being lost at sea. Tug O'Neale lived there and attended school until Year 10 when he transferred to Summer Bay High. Vinnie Patterson originally lived in Mangrove River before coming to the Bay. Throughout the years, Mangrove River began to be mentioned more frequently and has been started to become involved in many storylines including Nicole Franklin inviting some guests from suburb to a party and David "Gardy" Gardener coercing Roman Harris into a robbery on the Wharf. The River Boys, who were introduced in 2011, come from Mangrove River. Wilson's Beach is Mangrove River's main beach for surfing. Mangrove River High School was burnt down in October 2013 and its students were subsequently transferred to Summer Bay High. In 2015, Evelyn and Josh went to Mangrove River to find Matt.

=== Yabbie Creek ===
Yabbie Creek is Summer Bay's nearest neighbouring town where various characters either dine out, shop or take in movies. Yabbie Creek houses the police, fire, ambulance, medical, court house, major transport hubs and other services.

- Yabbie Creek High School – Emma Jackson attended the school for a month after being expelled from Summer Bay High for cheating. Ric Dalby originally attended here until he was expelled, as did Nick Smith following a temporary expulsion from Summer Bay High following accusations of sexual assault by Angie Russell. In the earlier years, the school had a soccer rivalry with Summer Bay High School.
- Northern Districts Hospital – The closest hospital to Summer Bay. Employees have included Dr. Sid Walker, Dr. Kelly Watson, Dr. Lachlan Fraser, Dr. James Fraser, Dr. Charlotte Adams, Dr. Flynn Saunders, Sam Holden, Rachel Armstrong, Dr. Nate Cooper, Dr. Tori Morgan, and nurses Eve Jacobsen and Jasmine Delaney. The hospital is located in Yabbie Creek or at least was during the early years of the programme, but moved during continental drift that also caused an earthquake that destroyed the Beachside Diner in 2008. The hospital was featured in a major storyline in the season finale for 2013 when a bomb was detonated inside, killing at least one person and injuring several others.
- Yabbie Creek University – The local university where many characters have enrolled over the years including Noah Lawson, Hayley Smith, Dani Sutherland, Irene Roberts, Indigo Walker, Dexter Walker, April Scott, Maddy Osborne, Matt Page, Josh Barrett, Evelyn MacGuire, Olivia Fraser-Richards and Mason Morgan.
- Yabbie Creek Police Local Area Command – The closest New South Wales Police Force Local Area Command to Summer Bay. Yabbie Creek LAC has gone through several upgrades during the show. The Command was used frequently when Nick Parrish lived in Summer Bay. After his departure, it was only seen occasionally, when Joel Nash became the main resident police officer. The LAC was used regularly again when the Summer Bay Stalker began terrorising the town in 2004 and Detective Peter Baker was on the case. Various Summer Bay residents have worked at the station, including Terri Garner, Pia Corelli, Jack Holden, Angelo Rosetta, Charlie Buckton. The station was then run for a time by the newly promoted Sergeant Georgina Watson, but after Senior Sergeant Mike Emerson assumed the role of Local Area Commander, she became his second-in-command. Detective Dylan Carter was based in Summer Bay for the Charlotte King murder investigation. After Sergeant Emerson was promoted in 2016 and moved to the city, Sergeant Phillip McCarthy took his place. Senior Constables Kat Chapman, Colby Thorne and Cash Newman have all worked at the station.
- Yabbie Creek RSL Club – The RSL has been mentioned throughout the series' run and seen sparingly. Alf Stewart has attended various functions there and Colleen Smart attended Gamblers Anonymous meetings there in 2002.
- Yabbie Creek Train Station – The train station was only seen twice in Episode 885 and was filmed at Hawkesbury River station on the Main North Line.
- Reefton Lakes – Another neighbouring suburb where Reefton Lakes High School is situated. Along with Summer Bay High School, it was under threat from closure in 2002. It was mentioned by Angelo Rosetta in 2010 when he offered to take his girlfriend Charlie Buckton on a date there and in 2012, Darryl Braxton competed in a cage fight there.
- Goulburn - Goulburn is a regional city outside Sydney. It is where the New South Wales Police Force Police College is. Its often referenced as the Academy by police officers. When Xavier Austin start Police College some scenes were filmed around him and his training, although no scenes of the Police College where filmed at the New South Wales Police Force College. Some scenes were shot in Goulburn when Xavier stops an armed robbery while still in training
- Sydney (Commonly referred to as The City) – The capital city of New South Wales, and is seen often on the show when residents visit. Morag Bellingham lives here when she is not in Summer Bay. In 1995, Shane Parrish and Angel Parrish went there as their date and in 2013, Bianca Scott and Heath Braxton went there for a few days. In 2016, Evelyn MacGuire, Josh Barrett, Matt Page and Maddy Osborne went to the city for the day. On the same night, Josh proposed to Evelyn. The Astoni family also lived there before they moved to Summer Bay.
- Melbourne – Melbourne is the capital city of Victoria, it was featured on the show in 2009 – when Melody Jones ran away from home and lived on the streets of Melbourne with Miles Copeland and Charlie Buckton looking for her. Melbourne also featured in 2012 when Darryl Braxton and Heath Braxton search for Kyle Braxton and force him to give evidence at Casey Braxton's trial for murdering Danny Braxton. It is also where Heath has his stag night with his brothers before his wedding to Bianca Scott. Melbourne was also seen in 1988 when Brett Macklin ran away with his newborn daughter Martha MacKenzie. Martha later stops breathing and Brett brings her to the hospital there. Martha's mother Roo Stewart later discusses adoption with Alf. Martha is then adopted by the MacKenzie's and is not seen again until 2005.

== Reception ==
A columnist for Jackie praised the setting of Summer Bay, stating that it was "pretty gorgeous and judging by the amount of sun they get it certainly lives up to its name! Wouldn't it be brilliant to live beside a beach and be able to watch all those hunky surfers and swimmers splashing about in the water? We personally can't think of anything better!"

In May 2000, Jackie Brygel of the Herald Sun noted that "Growing up in Summer Bay can't be easy. After all, we're talking about a place where tragedy happens at a more frequent rate than the opera." Brygel later pointed out that storylines in soaps move at a rapid pace, writing "The town of Summer Bay, a rural retreat where only those wishing to have their lives turned upside down would ever retreat to, is a perfect example of this phenomenon." Brygel said the Bay was perfect place if someone was "looking for love, romance and a place to swan around, day in, day out in the skimpiest of swimwear". She also said that "declarations of everlasting love are made more often than the entire cast of The Bold and the Beautiful hit the tanning salon."

Of the high number of bodies found in the town, a critic writing for the Daily Record commented "Perhaps Summer Bay should stop trying to be a holiday resort for sun-seekers and offer a tour of murder sights and tragic locations. There's barely a week goes by without a death." Following a series of issue-led storylines, including Leah Patterson's miscarriage and Irene Roberts' cancer diagnosis, another Daily Record reporter observed how the demeanour in the town had changed, writing "There was once a time when Summer Bay was a happy place to be. The sun was always shining, the birds sang and people went around with a smile on their faces. Only the odd cloud passed by to spoil things. Ah, how times have changed. These days the locals are more likely to go around feeling miserable than chirpy."

The Daily Record critic called the Bay "a bit of a bustling place", and believed it to be "the unluckiest area in the whole of Soapland – second only to Coronation Street". In August 2017, a reporter for the Birmingham Mail quipped "given the crime rate in Summer Bay, it's a wonder anyone wants to live there." They also dubbed the town "the sun-kissed den of doom".
