= The Great Storm (Home and Away) =

Storyline on the television show "Home and Away"

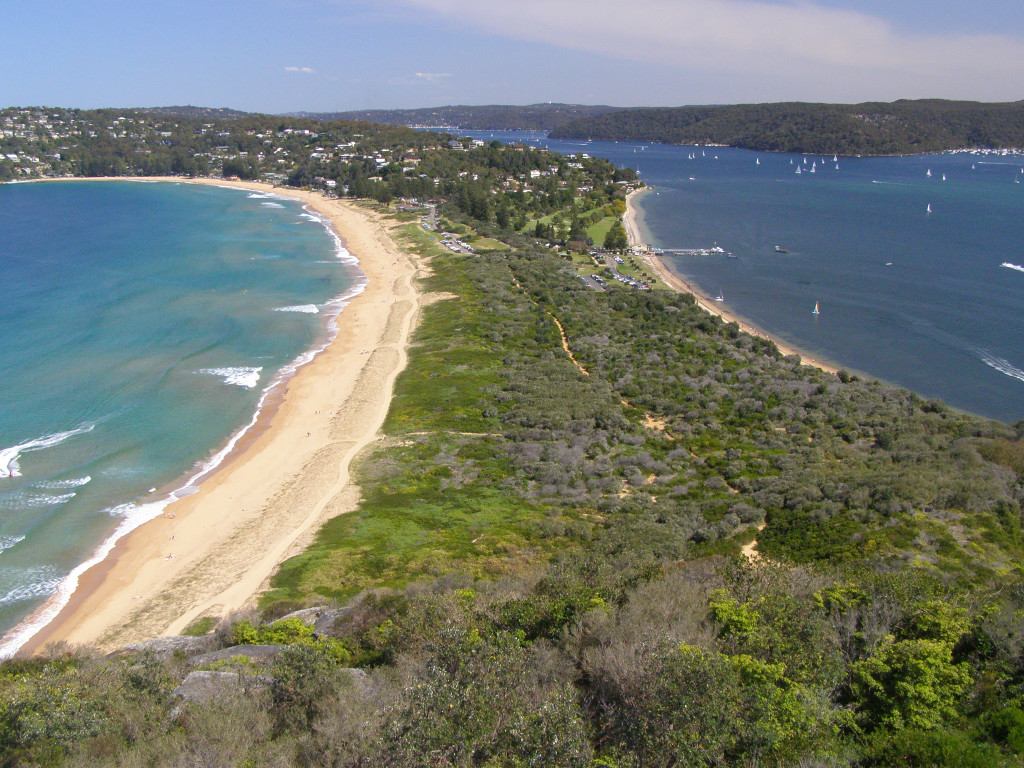
Palm Beach provides the setting of the fictional town of Summer Bay, in which The Great Storm occurs.

The Great Storm is a group of four episodes of the Australian soap opera Home and Away, broadcast between 5 and 8 September 2011 on Network Seven, during the show's twenty-fourth season. The episodes focused on a severe storm which crosses over the fictional town of Summer Bay and leaves several of the serial's characters in danger. Home and Away's producer Cameron Welsh first announced intention to screen the storyline in June 2011. It was self-described to be the "biggest stunt/disaster storyline" to ever feature in the serial. In the months prior to its screening, the cast filmed a series of stunts for the episodes on a shoot lasting eleven days. It marked the first time that Home and Away used a wide combination of special effects such as FX, green screen, wind machines and rain machines. Along with more time than usual spent filming the block of episodes, the storyline became Home and Away's most expensive to date. Welsh said that the use of machinery became problematic during filming so additional dialogue recordings were added to the scenes during post-production.

The storyline was promoted by the Seven Network and overseas broadcaster Channel 5, in the form of televisual adverts. One of the serial's cast members revealed that one character would die in the disaster, but details were kept under wraps until transmission. The storyline follows the struggle the characters encounter when the storm hits. Various characters become stranded in different locations while the majority take shelter at Summer Bay High where an evacuation centre is set up. The characters of Harvey Ryan (Marcus Graham) and Roo Stewart (Georgie Parker) become stranded when their boat capsizes, while Romeo Smith (Luke Mitchell) takes on the role of the "hero" and tries to save lives. Other segments include the character of Leah Patterson-Baker (Ada Nicodemou) nearly losing her unborn child and the roof collapsing at Summer Bay High leaving the characters of Colleen Smart (Lyn Collingwood), Bianca Scott (Lisa Gormley) and Heath Braxton (Dan Ewing) trapped in the wreckage. When the storm passes guest character Tegan Callahan (Saskia Burmeister) is killed in a car accident.

The episodes rated well on the Seven Network averaging at 1.131 million viewers for the whole block of episodes. The ratings fared less in the UK staying below the million mark. The storyline was not popular with Erin Miller from TV Week who opined that the special effects used ruined many scenes.

== Creation and development ==
In June 2011, the serial's producer Cameron Welsh revealed that Home and Away would air a special week of episodes featuring a storm. In July, Welsh told entertainment website Digital Spy that there were plans for the "biggest stunt/disaster storyline" that production team had ever undertaken. He said they were in the final stages of post-production meaning that it would come to air "very soon".

In August, Rhiannon Fish who plays April Scott told TV Week that the storyline would focus on a "deadly storm" that crosses the path of Summer Bay. Fish said that filming of the storyline was "full on" and wind and rain machines were installed on set to create the correct environment. Fish added that the cast felt like they were filming during an actual storm. Ada Nicodemou who plays Leah Patterson-Baker revealed that one character would die in the storm, but was not permitted to reveal their identity. She also said her character Leah would become trapped inside the Pier Diner and worried about the whereabouts of her son VJ Patterson (Felix Dean). As she is pregnant, when she discovers bleeding she presumes that she has miscarried. Nicodemou said the ill turn is down to the stress of the storm. Welsh later revealed more details on the storyline and the effects it would have on the characters. The main storyline threads feature the characters of Harvey Ryan (Marcus Graham) and Roo Stewart (Georgie Parker) facing danger when their boat capsizes during "rough seas". Alf Stewart (Ray Meagher) and Romeo Smith (Luke Mitchell) then go on the trail to save their lives. The serial's local school, Summer Bay High would become the "evacuation centre". Then a collapsed roof then traps the characters of Bianca Scott (Lisa Gormley) and Heath Braxton (Dan Ewing).

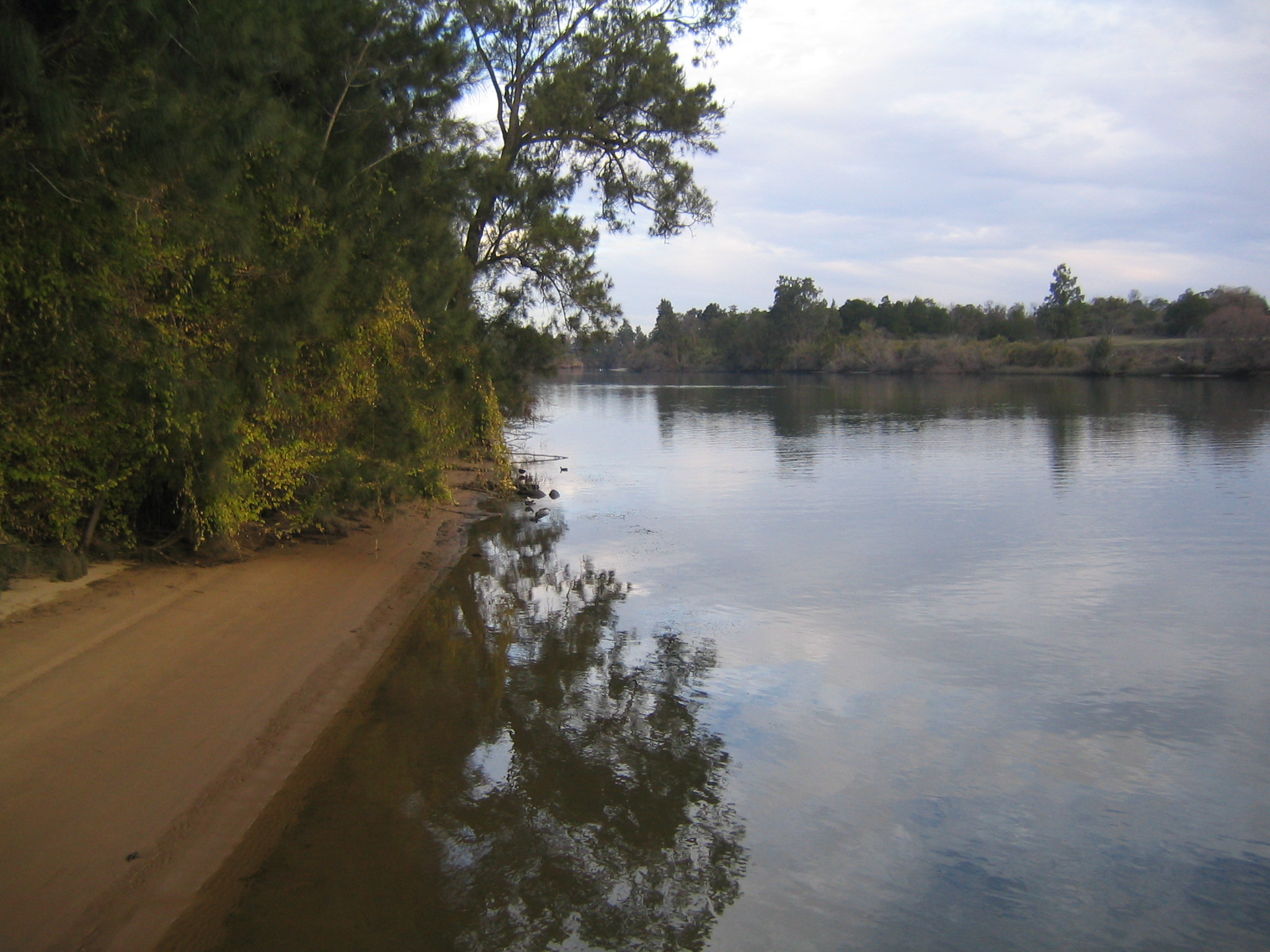
Romeo and Alf's attempts to rescue those on board a capsized boat were filmed at Cattai National Park (pictured)

The Great Storm is one of Home and Away's most expensive storylines to date. The episodes were filmed on a budget which was double the amount in costs that are needed to produce a "usual block" of episodes. Extra money was spent on additional days of shooting, wind and rain machines, FX and Computer-generated imagery. Filming took place for eleven days, five were spent on location while the rest were studio based. The shoot lasted three days extra than the typical number of days required to film. In the filming of the episodic block green screen and special effects were used. Home and Away previously had not used a combination of both, but Welsh said they needed to because it "brings the reality of the storm into our studio sets". While filming scenes on location shoots they were used to "intensify the overall feel of the storm". The cast also played out stunts and filmed in excess water.

The scenes in which Romeo and Alf rescue characters from a capsized boat were filmed on location at Cattai National Park. Rain machines and light towers were installed. Despite cold conditions Welsh said the cast morale had remained high because they felt they were "part of something special". Welsh said seeing the cast pull together creating "something so massive" was a memorable moment. He added that Luke Mitchell had to endure the worst conditions for a prolonged period of time while filming and praised his portrayal. Due to heightened set noise from the wind and rain machines, their cast members dialogue could not be heard in initial filming. A number of weeks later they added additional dialogue recordings to the scenes, this was the "biggest difficulty" that was faced during the production process.

== Plot ==
When John Palmer (Shane Withington) hears a severe weather warning issued via the local radio, he sends Xavier Austin (David Jones-Roberts) to close the beach down. Alone, John collapses from a ruptured spleen. Sasha Bezmel (Demi Harman) takes cover in the Austin household where she discovers John unconscious. When the ambulance crews arrive to save John, Sasha steals supplies from the house but is stopped by Xavier. Sid Walker (Robert Mammone) takes charge at the hospital responding to those injured in the storm.

Dennis Harling (Daniel Roberts) convinces Harvey and Roo to take his boat out on a business venture with potential clients. Alf and Romeo receive a distress signal from Harvey stating that their boat has capsized. Alf ensembles a response team and heads out to the national park. They find Roo and Dennis when they swim to the shore. Romeo tells Alf to take them to the hospital while he rescues Harvey. Romeo finds Harvey who has a deep laceration to his leg and is losing blood. When they attempt to drive back a tree fall ditches Romeo's vehicle and falls to the edge of a cliff. Romeo eventually manages to drag the car out of the ditch and seeks medical treatment for Harvey. Leah Patterson-Baker (Ada Nicodemou) and Elijah Johnson (Jay Laga'aia) take shelter in the Pier Diner. Leah is worried when her son VJ Patterson (Felix Dean) goes missing, but Elijah finds him on the beach. Leah feels ill and tells Elijah that she is bleeding and thinks she has lost her unborn baby.

Miles Copeland (Josh Quong Tart) and Gina Austin (Sonia Todd) set up a shelter at Summer Bay High. Heath arrives seeking shelter with his daughter Darcy Callahan (Alea O'Shea). Tegan Callahan (Saskia Burmeister) arrives in search of Darcy, she is annoyed that Heath took her without permission and drives off with her. Water begins to leak into the school and Colleen Smart (Lyn Collingwood) warns everyone that the storm is getting worse, though she is ignored. When the problem water gain worsens Gina decides to evacuate everyone to the other side of the school. Ruby Buckton (Rebecca Breeds) and Casey Braxton (Lincoln Younes) are nearly injured as part of the roof falls behind them. As they run, Bianca stands under the remaining segment of roofing. Heath plunges to save Bianca as the roof caves in on top of them. They remain trapped under the wreckage for a while, but rescue teams manage to save them. Colleen is found trapped using a lavatory which she rushed to use because of stress. Charlie Buckton (Esther Anderson) attends a car accident in which Tegan is trapped in. Tegan cannot break free as she is trapped under the steering wheel. After she is cut out of the wreckage, she is taken to hospital for surgery where she later dies. As the storm passes the residents of Summer Bay come to terms with the events and begin the clean-up operation.

== Promotion ==
To promote the storyline, the Seven Network issued two televisual advertisements which were broadcast on their station. They began airing in August advertising the start date for the storyline. The first showed Summer Bay in a calm setting with a warning of The Great Storm arriving. While the other profiled previous disaster style storylines which Home and Away had featured, with the addition of The Great Storm. It also featured preview clips and interviews with the cast talking about the scenes. The promotion revealed that the roof at Summer Bay High would collapse, a car would slip to the edge of a cliff and showed various character battling severe storm conditions.

The serial UK broadcaster Channel 5 released an advert in October before they were due to air the scenes. The clip featured several scenes from the episodes.

== Ratings and reception ==
The first episode of The Great Storm was the third most watched programme in Australia averaging at 1.208 million viewers. The second episode featuring Romeo and Alf's rescue mission average at 1.176 million viewers. The third episode featuring the roof collapse at Summer Bay High averaged at 1.09 million. While the serial's fourth outing saw a considerable drop averaging at 707 thousand viewers. The end of week ratings report concluded that Home and Away performed well on the Seven Network averaging at 1.131 million. The first gained 998,000 while the second dropped to 870,000 with the third and fourth steadying onto 893,000 and 824,000 viewers.

A columnist from TV Central said that The Great Storm was the Seven Network's "highly anticipated television event" and added that Summer Bay was "hit like never before" compared to previous disaster plots. Erin Miller of TV Week had a mixed reaction to the episodes. While it was "great to see Summer Bay deal with a natural disaster" that created many "tense moments", Miller said that the special effects ruined various scenes. She opined that Indigo Walker (Samara Weaving) was left to play "the irritating self-absorbed character" as usual. Miller commented that Romeo triumphed as the "hero" of the storyline when he saves Harvey's life.

In the Inside Soap Yearbook 2012 "The Great Storm" was chosen as the "big moment" of October 2011 in UK soaps. Their columnist said that the storyline made a "spectacular week" of episodes centered around the "powerful" storm that left "despair and destruction" in its path. They said "we were on the edge of our seats as we waited to find out if the tempest would take anyones life."
