= Great Storm =

Great Storm may refer to:

- Great Storm of 1703
- Great Lakes Storm of 1913
- North Sea flood of 1953, also known as The Great Storm of 1953
- Ash Wednesday Storm of 1962, also known as The Great Atlantic Storm of 1962
- Great Storm of 1975 - Tornado outbreak and large blizzard in the United States
- Great Storm of 1987

== In media ==
- The Great Storm (Home and Away), a set of episodes which broadcast during the 2011 season of Australian soap opera, Home and Away, in a special story arc.
- The Great Storm Is Over, a song by Bob Franke

== See also ==
- European windstorm
- Great Gale (disambiguation)
