= Charlie Buckton =

Fictional Australian TV character

- Home and Away character
- Portrayed by: Esther Anderson
- Duration: 2008–2013
- First appearance: 6 June 2008
- Last appearance: 20 June 2013
- Introduced by: Cameron Welsh
In-universe information
- Occupation: Police Sergeant
- Father: Ross Buckton
- Mother: Elsie Buckton
- Stepmother: Morag Bellingham
- Daughters: Ruby Buckton
- Aunts: Michelle

Charlie Buckton is a fictional character from the Australian Channel Seven soap opera Home and Away, played by Esther Anderson. Anderson was added to the cast in a bid to add more "sex appeal" to the show. She said it was her dream job and relocated to Sydney immediately to accommodate filming. The character made her on-screen debut during the episode airing on 6 June 2008. Charlie was billed as having a "warm heart" and being "family oriented"; however, her actions are often misunderstood and her persona has been perceived as "brash". She is described as being "passionate about her work" and often neglects her daughter, Ruby's (Rebecca Breeds) needs.

Charlie's first notable storyline was a lesbian relationship with Joey Collins (Kate Bell). The storyline was implemented by producers to boost ratings and Anderson said it helped portray Charlie's vulnerable side. The storyline angered Christian and conservative oriented family groups. They complained that Home and Away had featured sexualised plotlines unsuitable for children. As a result, producers cut scenes to attune to viewers' wishes, which outraged the LGBT community. Charlie's sexuality was never named within the series, and is cited as contributing to a growing trend of 'unnamed bisexuality' for women characters who explore temporary same-sex romances in Australian drama. The storyline came to a natural end and Anderson and executive producer Cameron Welsh praised the plot because it portrayed a real-life situation and denounced the conservative views as outdated. Anderson stated that the storyline was a great one to portray in terms of acting.

Charlie's sexuality was sidelined and she began a relationship with Angelo Rosetta (Luke Jacobz). Throughout their romance Charlie played out various family oriented plots and was described as having strong feelings for him. Their romance was portrayed to be wayward and unstable. In 2011, their relationship ended after producers felt there were no more storylines to give to the pair. Charlie later develops feelings for Darryl Braxton (Steve Peacocke). Another notable storyline for Charlie saw her reveal that her supposed sister, Ruby, was in fact her daughter. Anderson said the filming process was challenging as they felt the need to get the story right. Viewers sympathised with Charlie and saw a "beautiful element" in the portrayal. The revelation ruined the on-screen relationship between Charlie and Ruby, and was never repaired.

Charlie has received critical analysis through her storylines and persona and opinion has been mixed. Ruth Deller of Lowculture said Charlie had endured "scandalous-headline-grabbing-faux-lesbianity", whilst Holy Soap stated that she has a "questionable taste in men." The Daily Star liked Charlie's image, which they branded "sexy", and the Daily Record praised her for the drama she creates. Anderson's portrayal of Charlie has seen her earn various award nominations, including the "Most Popular Personality on Australian Television" and "Most Popular Actress" Logie Awards. Charlie departed on 24 January 2012, following Anderson's decision to quit Home and Away. However, in November 2012, it was announced that Anderson had reprised her role and Charlie returned on 17 June 2013.

== Casting ==
In May 2008, former model Anderson was recruited by Home and Away in a bid to add "sex appeal" to the show. Anderson was a long-time fan of Home and Away and she said she was "thrilled" when she won the role of Charlie after an audition. Four days after hearing that she had landed the part, Anderson had to move to Sydney from Melbourne for filming. Anderson has said that her job as a model should not reflect on her acting ability. She added "For me, modelling was just an avenue that got me into acting, I have always wanted to act". She also stated that the role is her dream job.

== Development ==
=== Characterisation ===
When Charlie first arrived in the Bay, Channel Seven described her as having a "bone to pick and the prowess to do it" in reference to her father, Ross' (David Downer) relationship with Morag Bellingham (Cornelia Frances), which Charlie disapproved of because her mother had only recently died. They also described her as having a "warm heart" and being "family oriented". Charlie can be "misunderstood" at times, which makes her appear brash. On her character, Anderson said, "Charlie is strong-willed with lots of guts and she is never afraid to show who she is, which makes her genuine and likeable". Whilst interviewed by the Llanelli Star, Anderson described Charlie's responsibilities stating: "Charlie is very passionate about her work. She cares about Ruby more than life itself and is responsible for her, so these are priorities over a finding a man. I don't think it's a matter of need for her but she definitely would like someone to share her life with and that romantic element is a good balance in Charlie's somewhat serious life."

=== Relationship with Roman Harris ===
Charlie's first relationship is with Roman Harris (Conrad Coleby), which was confirmed by Coleby via an interview in TV Week. Roman initially rejects Charlie's advances; until she goes on a date with Angelo Rosetta (Luke Jacobz). Coleby told TV Week that Charlie and Roman's first kiss is a "strange moment". The pair get off to a bad start because of a misunderstanding. Coleby said that Charlie is "feisty" and Roman finds that attractive. He added that Roman was not on the rebound after splitting up with Martha MacKenzie (Jodi Gordon) because Roman ended it. Coleby said that his daughter, Nicole Franklin (Tessa James) creates problems with Charlie because Roman "has his hands full" with her. Charlie's has headstrong expectations of herself and also expects the same from those around her. This trait often causes problems for her romance with Roman.

Roman soon tires of Charlie's outlook on life and decides to end their relationship. Coleby told TV Week that "whenever things go wrong in life, Charlie sees them as black and white, whereas Roman can see that there are two sides to a story." Coleby opined that Roman has "residual feelings" for Martha that he is not aware of.Natalie Franklin (Adrienne Pickering) also makes Roman realise that Charlie is "kind of irritating". Natalie's actions make Roman realise that "they're just not suited to each other". However, Coleby said that he hoped there was a future for the characters, but felt it was better that they "move apart for a while".

After their break up Charlie gets drunk and goes into work as normal the next day. While on duty Annie Campbell (Charlotte Best) becomes stuck down a storm drain. Charlie attempts to save her but a storm forces the water levels to rise. As Charlie is hungover, Anderson told Inside Soap that "Charlie's a bit dazed and confused when all this happens". However, she is a "professional and goes straight into work mode". When Charlie frees Annie, a wave of water floods the drain and Charlie is swept away. Roman then arrives on the scene and fights to save Charlie. Anderson explained that it is up to Roman to save Charlie's life and said "of all people it has to be the guy who's just broken her heart". Off-screen the scenes in the storm drain posed a series of logistical challenges for the production team. The series had a specially built set for the scenes and they placed jets under the water to create rough waves. Anderson said that she could swim and was not afraid to film in the water. The only problem was the temperature of the water. Anderson said "It was absolutely freezing. Filming was tough work, but I think the finished result is worth it."

=== Relationship with Joey Collins ===
When I first saw the storyline, I knew straight away that it's an opportunity every actor looks for – to be given a challenge and a role and story to sink their teeth into, I looked forward to telling the story and working on telling it the right way.

— Anderson's reaction to receiving the storyline.

In 2009, Home and Away producers introduced a storyline that saw Charlie begin a relationship with another woman. Producers hoped the plot would boost the shows ratings. Over five weeks, the storyline would see Charlie realise that her friendship with Joey Collins (played by Kate Bell) is beginning to develop into something else. As they fall for each other, Charlie and Joey share intimate kissing and dance scenes. Anderson explained that the producers came to her about the storyline and asked if she was okay with it, as it was to be emotional and it required commitment. Anderson told them that she was okay with it and she said she was pleased to be given the storyline as it showed more of Charlie's vulnerable side. This was Anderson's first big storyline in the show and she was required to work more hours. Anderson explained that she and Bell formed a trust early on, which helped them to portray the story in the right light. Anderson spoke with gay friends, so she could form an accurate portrayal of her character's feelings. The storyline "throws [Charlie's] world upside down" and changes her whole identity; it surprises her.

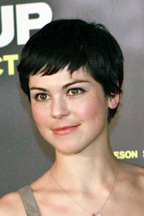
Kate Bell (pictured) and Anderson developed a trust early on, which helped them to portray the storyline right.

Upon the announcement of the storyline, church and conservative family groups attacked the plot. Pro-Family Perspectives director Angela Conway said "They (Home and Away) continue to market to kids and they continue to develop quite sexualised plot lines". Two weeks after the storyline began airing, viewing figures for the show fell by over 100,000 and Channel Seven was inundated with complaints from parents asking for their children not to be exposed to same-sex relationships in a family show. Following pressure from the conservative groups, it was announced that Channel Seven had decided to censor a kissing scene between Charlie and Joey. Producers were to cut "intimate images" from a scene in which the characters share a passionate kiss.

Gay and lesbian groups staged protests against the show, despite an announcement from Channel Seven saying that the episode would be shown in its entirety. The broadcaster said the kiss would air as planned, but they had decided against showing a "more lusty follow up" scene. Seven's head of creative drama and development, Bevan Lee, said Home and Away bosses cut the "more lusty follow up because it fitted better with the storyline". Lee added that he was "saddened" that the storyline had been reduced to a "facile argument about six missing seconds of screen time and that the bulk of commentators, both conservative and liberal, are making pronouncements on story material they know nothing of". British broadcaster, Five, said that they would show the kiss during their airing of the episode. The channel said "Five, the UK broadcaster for Home and Away, will screen a lesbian kiss in a forthcoming episode. It forms part of a six-week-long story, about the attraction between two female characters, Joey and Charlie. There will be several episodes where the characters kiss". They added that the producers at Channel Seven "edit all episodes for artistic and editorial reasons only" and the storyline would remain uncompromised in its Australian airing.

A Channel Seven spokeswoman revealed that the network received fewer than 30 telephone calls nationally after screening the "lesbian kiss" episode of the show. The calls were evenly split between those supporting the broadcast of the kiss, and those raising concerns. The show's series producer Cameron Welsh and Anderson both spoke out in defence of the storyline. Welsh said, "The idea of this show has always been that we hold a mirror to society – and when society changes, we change with it. What's ahead in Home and Away is right not only for the series, but also for the times we are living in". Anderson said that she felt it was the right time to tell this story and added, "It's really important for us to reflect society, and this storyline is what is going on for many people in real life". She also said that she did not think the plot would be so shocking, but was glad the show was exploring a gay relationship.

The end of the storyline was criticised by gay advocates after Charlie was seen having sex with Hugo Austin (Bernard Curry) and Joey left Summer Bay alone. Anderson also suggested that Hugo may have been enough to "sway" Charlie towards men. Some sceptics had suggested that Home and Away would not allow Charlie and Joey to remain in a same-sex relationship. Anderson later acknowledged she had feared that the story would see her typecast as "the lesbian cop." Anderson reflected on the storyline during an interview with The Daily Telegraph, saying "The Charlie/Joey (lesbian) storyline was the first time you got to see Charlie's vulnerable side. (The controversy) blew my mind – I wasn't expecting it at all. I think it was a fantastic storyline because for the first time I got to show the producers and audience what I could do."

=== Relationship with Angelo Rosetta ===
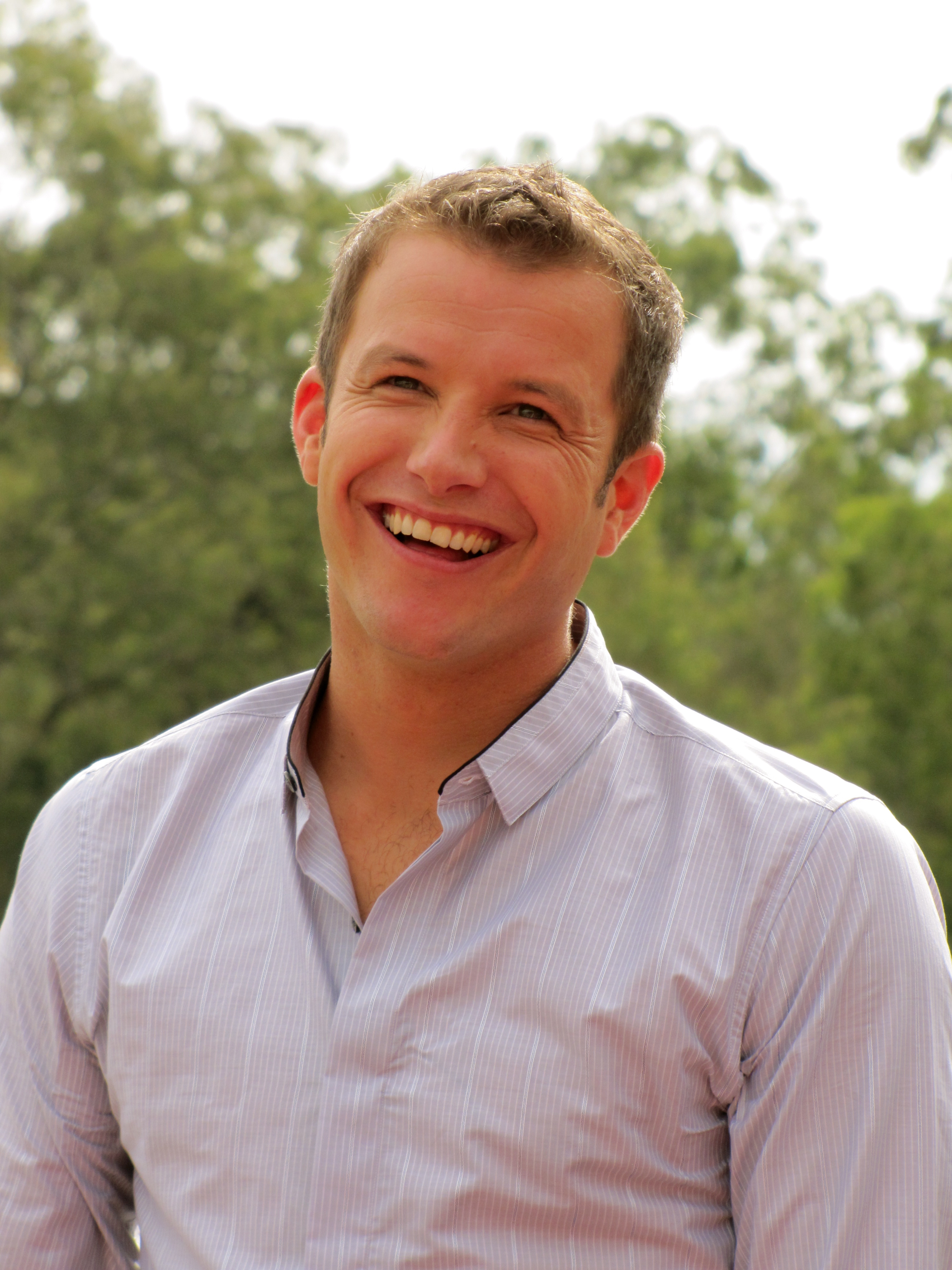
Luke Jacobz (pictured) played Angelo Rosetta; producers decided to separate Charlie and Angelo to provide a new challenge for them.

Charlie's relationship with Angelo has been a focal point in her storylines. They originally date, but break up after Angelo kills Jack Holden (Paul O'Brien). Charlie becomes jealous when Angelo begins dating May Stone (Alin Sumarwata) and Anderson told Inside Soap that "Charlie's feelings for Angelo are complex." Charlie cannot fight her attraction to Angleo and the actress claimed that the couple would not have broken up if it had not been for Jack's death. Anderson also stated that the storyline sees a new side to Charlie, jealousy. She decides to get in the way of his new relationship. Anderson went on to explain: "She admits part of her wanted to cause trouble, but Angelo is still attracted to Charlie and they sleep together." The actress also defends Charlie's actions claiming she did not intentionally set out to hurt May. Charlie and Angeo's relationship dynamic becomes strained after Charlie refuses to give Angelo an "easy life." Although they have a "great connection between them", Anderson felt Angelo would not put up with Charlie for long because she can be "quite bossy." She also said "Charlie's got the good end of the stick and poor Angelo is in for a pretty rough ride!"

Anderson later revealed that Charlie and Angelo would face tough times in 2011, stating: "They've had their fair share of hurdles – and there are more to come." Charlie and Angelo split up and Anderson admitted she was happy that there is always drama in Charlie's love life and she added "I think it's going to be full-on for Ms Buckton this year. But, you know, romances in Summer Bay never last." Of breaking Charlie and Angelo up, Welsh said, "The thinking behind that was to challenge the characters and do something a bit different." He went on to explain that with characters who have been together a long time, there is a temptation to repeat storylines and the team wanted to change the dynamic between Charlie and Angelo.

=== Illegitimate daughter ===
Another story arc saw Charlie reveal that her sister Ruby Buckton (Rebecca Breeds) is in fact her daughter. Charlie gave birth to Ruby after she was raped by Grant Bledcoe (Clayton Watson), when she was younger. Both Anderson and Breeds found the storyline challenging and felt they had to get it right. Breeds said it made her nervous but was pleased with the result. She said she had to let it affect her own emotions to effect the viewing public. "The revelation ruins their relationship, and Anderson said that Charlie was "trying desperately to bridge this gap". Breeds added "Ruby just wants to get some security back, everything she thought her life was is totally up in the air". Ruby becomes confused and starts to ask herself questions such as "Where do I stand now?" and "How do I reconcile this?" Breeds said it was a "big exploration" and a journey for Ruby, with Anderson agreeing. Anderson felt there was a beautiful element to the storyline and opined: "Although it is tragic, you feel sorry for Charlie and you can sort of understand where it has all come from." She added that everyone feels sorry for Ruby, meaning neither are wrong. Furthermore, she said, "You are just rooting for them, you just want them to get back to how they were and it is a bit of a journey." Comparing the storyline to the lesbian plot she said, "Perhaps this storyline was a little bit harder, you've seen the start of this storyline and there is a lot more to come and it wasn't easy."

Charlie later struggles to deal with Ruby's relationship with Casey Braxton (Lincoln Younes). Discussing Charlie's motives, Anderson stated: "Ruby's at that age where she is quite impressionable, and Charlie doesn't want to see her getting hurt. She's only very recently been in a relationship with Romeo Smith (Luke Mitchell), and Charlie is concerned about her moving from one guy to the next too quickly." Anderson opined it is Darryl Braxton (Steve Peacocke) who gives Charlie her first piece of good parenting advice. She concluded that Charlie's approach only causes conflict with Ruby because she is so strong-willed.

=== Darryl Braxton ===
"It's a great struggle for Charlie and Brax, and it shows that you can't choose who you fall for. It's sizzling because they both want one thing, but they can't really go there."

— Anderson on Charlie and Darryl

In February 2011, Darryl Braxton was introduced to the show and The Daily Telegraph reported that he was set to get to know Charlie in a future storyline. Charlie meets Darryl after she comes to ask him to keep his surf gang under control. During an interview with Digital Spy, Peacocke was asked if Darryl likes Charlie romantically and he said, "For a bloke like Brax, Charlie is pretty ideal – she's smart, sexy and is strong enough to take him on. He's all about testing himself and he knows he'll be running a gauntlet if he pursues her. She's got that X-factor he can't ignore." When a fight breaks out at the Surf Club, Charlie arrives to investigate and she asks Darryl to step outside, so they can talk. Darryl misinterprets the situation and believes Charlie just wants to be alone with him, he then kisses her. Charlie is "horrified" and she arrests Darryl for assaulting a police officer. Peacocke revealed that after the arrest, "things will develop dangerously" between Charlie and Darryl and that it will be "tense to watch!" Charlie is put under pressure from the community to find a more serious crime with which to charge Darryl and his gang. She believes that he is selling stolen alcohol to Angelo, but everything checks out and Darryl come to the belief that the kiss has "sparked something in Charlie."

Darryl is initially unsuccessful in his attempts to win Charlie over, but Anderson hinted that her character would fall for him. She said, "I think the way Steve [Peacocke] has played Brax, there is definitely enough there for Charlie to see that he has a heart and to see the good side in him as well." Discussing the plot in which Charlie tried to keep Ruby away from Casey, Anderson said, "I think she's also telling herself to stay away from Brax, but Charlie can't get him out of her head." Colin Vickery of The Daily Telegraph said Darryl had turned Charlie's "safe police world" upside down, and Anderson told him, "What is wonderful about this relationship is that it is forbidden love. There is this element of danger that brings excitement along with it." She described the relationship as "fun and flirty" and said it shows another layer to Charlie, as it has brought out her fun side. The arrival of Darryl's ex-girlfriend Tegan Callahan (Saskia Burmeister) causes Charlie and Darryl to split. However, Vickery said it was obvious that Charlie cannot stay away from Darryl for long.

=== Departure and death ===
In November 2011, Jonathon Moran and Elle Halliwell of The Daily Telegraph announced Anderson had quit Home and Away to further her acting career in Hollywood. The following month, Inside Soap writer Sarah Ellis reported Anderson had confirmed her departure from the show. Moran and Halliwell said it was unknown whether Charlie would be killed off or move to The city. On 22 January 2012, The Daily Telegraph's Debbie Schipp reported Anderson had filmed her final scenes with the show in August and they would air later that week. Anderson said she was happy with her decision to leave Home and Away and "throw my life in the air and see what happens." On screen, Charlie decided to move to the city with Brax, Ruby and Casey. However, at the end of the show's 23rd season, Charlie was shot twice by Jake Pirovic (Fletcher Humphrys), in revenge for her shooting dead his brother. Charlie was critically injured and rushed to the hospital, where she underwent surgery. Sid Walker (Robert Mammone) later told Ruby that Charlie was being kept alive by a ventilator and that she would not breathe on her own again. Ruby was then left with the decision as to whether she should turn Charlie's life support off or not.

Both Ruby and Brax decide Charlie's ventilator should be turned off as there is nothing more the doctors can do for her and Charlie dies. Speaking about her character's exit storyline, Anderson said "When I read the final script for Charlie's exit, I made sure I was in the privacy of my own home. It was written really well – it was a tragic love story and I hope the fans like it." The actress explained that the storyline was great and the writers had done a brilliant job with Charlie and Brax. She also said some fans would be disappointed that the couple did not end up together. Anderson revealed that the series producer had told her that after investing so much in getting Charlie together with Brax, she would not have left the Bay for another reason and killing her off was the best way. Of her reaction to the storyline, Anderson said "I started sobbing! But that was the initial shock. You play this character for three and a half years and you really empathise with them. You have to love a part of them – it's a little extension of you. So it's just so final, the death. But once I had time to let it sink in, now I'm really, really happy with the ending. It's very dramatic and it's definitely going out with a bang, so to speak!" Anderson departed on screen on 24 January 2012.

=== Return ===
On 25 November 2012, Debbie Schipp from the Herald Sun reported that Anderson would return to Home and Away in December to shoot "a handful of episodes" to be broadcast during the following year. Schipp revealed that there was "intense speculation" about how the writers would get around the fact that Charlie died on-screen in January. Of her return, Anderson explained "I told my mum and dad that I was coming back, and they almost fell off their chairs. They said: 'Hang on, didn't Charlie die?' It's hilarious, because this time twelve months ago I was keeping it the biggest secret from everyone as to whether Charlie would live or die, and now I'm in the same boat again as far as not giving anything away." The actress added that the return storyline was outlined a couple of months ago and she just knew that she wanted to do it. Charlie returned on 17 June 2013.

== Storylines ==
Charlie arrives in Summer Bay to tell Morag Bellingham to leave her father, Ross, alone. However, Ross tells her that he loves Morag. Charlie is partnered with Jack Holden when she starts her job as a Senior Constable at the Yabbie Creek Police Station and her sister, Ruby, arrives in the Bay. Charlie begins a relationship with Roman Harris and she eventually accepts Ross and Morag being together. Ross and Morag marry, but after they come back from their honeymoon, Charlie realises something is wrong with her father. Ross is diagnosed with Alzheimer's, devastating Charlie. He later moves into a home. Roman breaks up with Charlie and she begins drinking and refusing help. She rescues Annie Campbell from a storm drain and nearly dies. She is rescued by Roman, which makes her bitter. Charlie gets a promotion at work and she goes on a date with Angelo Rosetta. Charlie becomes a respected member of the community and she builds up strong friendships with Leah Patterson-Baker (Ada Nicodemou) and Miles Copeland (Josh Quong Tart).

Charlie gets involved in Joey Collins' rape investigation. When Joey's brother, Brett (Toby Levins), kicks her out of their home, Charlie invites her to stay at Leah's. Charlie and Joey grow closer and after Charlie saves Joey from drowning, they kiss. Charlie rejects Joey, but she eventually admits that she likes her and they begin a relationship. One night, Charlie gets drunk and sleeps with Hugo Austin. Joey finds out and leaves town. Charlie admits to Angelo that she has feelings for him and they begin dating. Charlie is deliberately run over by Brett during a date with Angelo. She is taken to the hospital and a doctor notices a cesarean scar. Morag confronts Charlie and she claims that she had a baby boy who died. Charlie later tells Angelo and Ruby that she was raped by her boyfriend, Grant, when she was fourteen and that Ruby is actually her daughter. Ruby runs away, but she returns and moves in with Irene Roberts (Lynne McGranger). Grant arrives in the Bay, horrifying Charlie. She angrily confronts Grant and later kidnaps him and tries to force him into confessing that he raped her. Grant later dies and Charlie becomes the prime suspect. She is arrested, but Ross later confesses to killing Grant.

Angelo is promoted to Sergeant and Charlie is promoted to Leading Senior Constable, becoming his second-in-command, which causes tension between the pair; not only does Charlie have to take orders from an officer who was until recently her subordinate, but also has to get used to sharing what had once been her own office. Angelo is forced to leave the police force and Charlie feels guilty when she is made Sergeant. She encourages Angelo when he decides to set up a restaurant. They later decide to end their relationship and agree to remain friends. Ross dies and Charlie and Ruby attend his funeral. The River Boys, a surf gang from Mangrove River, arrive in town and Darryl "Brax" Braxton begins flirting with Charlie. He later kisses her and Charlie arrests him for assault. Charlie becomes concerned when Ruby tells her that she had sex with Romeo Smith and later suffers a hypoglycemic attack. Charlie discovers Ruby with Casey Braxton and she tells Brax to keep Casey away from Ruby. Charlie is called out to a party at a mansion and arrests Casey. She realises that Ruby was also involved and threatens to stop her from seeing Casey. Brax visits Charlie and they argue. Brax kisses her again and they have sex. Charlie tells him it was a mistake, but she kisses him again and asks him to keep their relationship quiet.

Angelo tells Charlie about a marijuana plantation. When Charlie and the other officers get to it, they find and arrest Heath Braxton (Daniel Ewing). Angelo goes missing and Charlie worries that Brax is involved. Angelo is eventually found, but he tells Charlie that he does not remember what happened. Morag and Angelo discover Charlie's relationship with Brax and she decides to end it. The couple eventually get back together. Brax's ex-girlfriend, Tegan, arrives in the Bay and works out Charlie is seeing Brax. Charlie arrests Heath and Jake Pirovic following a drugs raid and Ruby learns of Charlie and Brax's relationship. Brax and Charlie split up again. Charlie is devastated when she learns Brax had sex with Tegan. Charlie arrests Heath again and he is sent to jail. Brax is stabbed and Charlie finds him and gets him to the hospital. She realises she loves him, but Tegan arrives and announces Brax is the father of her daughter. Charlie later learns Tegan was lying.

Heath gets out of jail and walks in on Charlie and Brax together. Charlie tells the Inspector about her relationship with Brax, but he allows her stay with the case. During The Great Storm, Tegan is in a car accident and Charlie attends to her, they talk about loving Brax. Tegan dies and Charlie learns Jake's brother, Hammer (Benedict Samuel), has threatened her life. While she is out jogging, Charlie is shot at. Brax pushes her out of the way, but she sustains an injury to her arm. Hammer kidnaps Charlie and holds her and Brax hostage. When Hammer goes to kill Brax, Charlie shoots him dead. She is briefly suspended from her job. Charlie begins investigating an arson attack at Jake's place and she arrests Casey. During his hearing, Casey's lawyer, Hayley O'Connor (Alyssa McClelland), exposes Charlie and Brax's relationship and the Coastal News publishes a front-page article about it. Charlie tells Brax they should be together, but she changes her mind when she learns Brax had sex with Hayley.

Charlie investigates a robbery at a petrol station and she goes on a date with Simon Peet (Rory Williamson). Forensics link Brax to the robbery and he tells Charlie he is being set up. Charlie is later removed from the case and she gives Brax an opportunity to steal evidence. Charlie goes to a cabin in the countryside with Bianca Scott (Lisa Gormley) and Brax and Heath show up. Brax and Charlie talk and they get back together. On their way home, Charlie and Brax crash into Liam Murphy (Axle Whitehead). Bianca and Heath cover for them and Charlie's friendship with Bianca breaks down. Charlie decides to quit her job and she asks Brax to leave the River Boys, which he does. Charlie and Brax then make plans to move to the city with Casey and Ruby. On her last day in uniform, Charlie is shot by Jake. She is found by Casey, Ruby and Brax and taken to the hospital, when she undergoes surgery. Charlie is placed on life support and Ruby is told she will not breathe on her own again. Ruby and Brax decide Charlie's ventilator should be turned off and Charlie dies.

When Brax is shot by Adam Sharpe (Martin Lynes), he falls unconscious and Charlie appears to him in a vision. She warns Brax that he is in danger and that night he is poisoned by Adam in the hospital, causing him to go into a coma. Charlie appears to Brax again and he explains that he is tired of fighting. He tells Charlie that he wishes to remain with her, saying that his brothers no longer need him. Charlie tries to encourage Brax to go back and asks him about Ricky Sharpe (Bonnie Sveen). She realises that Brax loves Ricky and tells him to let go, so he can return to her.

== Reception ==
For her portrayal of Charlie, Anderson has garnered various award nominations. At the 2008 Inside Soap Awards, Anderson received a nomination for "Sexiest Female". In 2010, she was nominated for "Best Daytime Star". That same year saw Anderson earn nominations for the "Most Popular Personality on Australian Television" and "Most Popular Actress" Logie Awards. 2011 saw Anderson nominated once again for "Best Daytime Star" at the Inside Soap Awards. Anderson received nominations for Most Popular TV personality and Most Popular Actress at the 2012 Logie Awards. The episode featuring Charlie's death was nominated for an Australian Writers' Guild award.

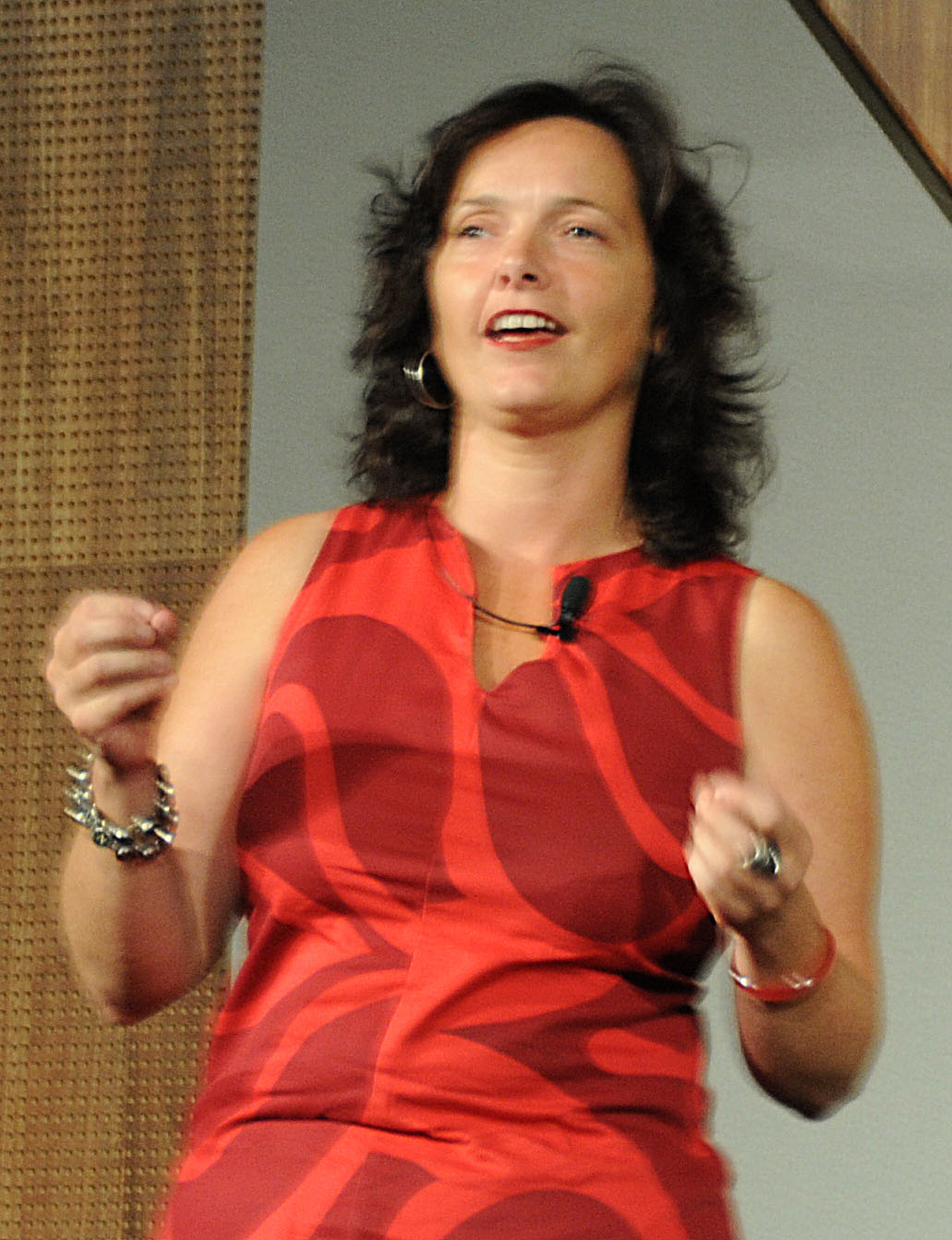
Catherine Deveny criticised the reaction to Charlie's lesbian plot

Holy Soap described the character's most memorable moment as "Locking lips with gal pal Joey". In her book Free to a Good Home, author Catherine Deveny criticised the reaction to Charlie and Joey's same sex relationship. She called the first kiss between the couple the "TV disappointment of the year" and she nicknamed the soap Homo Go Away because the scene in which the kiss featured were diluted to suit certain viewers. Of the decline in ratings during the storyline, Deveny said "Since the lesbian plotline began two weeks ago, 100,000 people have turned off. Wow! Turned off. That must be the first time the words 'lesbian' and 'turn off' have occurred in the same sentence. And all we'd seen until Tuesday was lingering touches and intense stares." Deveny then explained that she would rather let her children watch lesbians on television than Christians. She highlighted that only mothers complained to the network about their children being exposed to a same-sex relationship during a family show, not fathers.

In September 2010, the Holy Soap website ran a poll to find viewers' favourite Home and Away couple, which Charlie and Angelo won with 45% of the vote. The website branded them as "the Bay's criminally hot couple" and said they had been keeping viewers glued to their screens with their on/off-relationship. They later said Charlie had a "questionable taste in men". Peter Dyke, writing for British tabloid the Daily Star, branded Charlie as "Sexy" and states: "Most fellas would not mind feeling the strong arm of the law if this beauty was their local police officer." The Daily Record opined that Charlie's determination to prove Grant as a rapist was "dangerously close to an obsession." They also said that ever since Charlie and her family arrived in Summer Bay they have "created drama."

The character was negatively received by Ruth Deller of television website Lowculture. In May 2009, Deller placed Charlie at number five on her list of worst soap opera characters segment. Deller said, "The Summer Bay cop may have lots of storylines, but the LC community don't really approve – mainly due to Esther Anderson's apparent lack of acting chops. It's like our hatred for Michelle Connor (Coronation Street) all over again, only this time with added scandalous-headline-grabbing-faux-lesbianity!" In July 2009, Deller said, "It would be easy to spend every month slagging off Charlie, because there's so much to dislike". Deller also added that Charlie's daughter is "everything Charlie isn't".

All About Soap said Charlie and Darryl's chemistry was "clear for everyone to see" and wondered when she would stop hiding behind her "law-abiding facade". When Charlie and Darryl share their "steamy moment", Erin Miller of TV Week said "It was the moment we've all been waiting for."

Kerry Barrett and Carena Crawford of All About Soap said Charlie was both a "sexy sergeant" and the soap opera's "cutest crime fighter". They opined that getting involved with Brax was never going to end well for Charlie but did not suspect she would die. The pair concluded that while it was sad for them, they were unsure how the residents of Summer Bay would manage without Charlie.
