= Great Gale =

Great Gale may refer to the following weather events:

- Great September Gale of 1815 – New England
- 1848 Tampa Bay hurricane - Tampa Bay, 24 September 1848
- Great Gale of 1861 – Hartlepool and the north east coast of England, Saturday 9 February 1861
- Great Gale of 1865 – Table Bay, South Africa, 17 May 1865
- Great Gale of 1871 – Bridlington and north east coast of England, Friday 10 February 1871
- Great Gale of 1880 – Oregon, 9 January 1880
- Great Coastal Gale of 2007 – Pacific Northwest, November 29–December 4 2007

== See also ==
- European windstorm
- Great Storm (disambiguation)
