= Lane Cove River Tourist Park =

Coordinates: 33°47′22.30″S 151°8′35.40″E

Lane Cove River Tourist Park is a caravan park and campground in the Australian state of New South Wales located in the suburb of Macquarie Park within the boundaries of the Lane Cove National Park and about 10 kilometres (6.2 mi) north of the Sydney Harbour Bridge. It is operated by the NSW National Parks & Wildlife Service. It is located on the western side of national park.

== History ==
The land within the national park allocated to the tourist park has been a camping area since at least 1968. There are records of amenities buildings being constructed in 1968 but it is believed that there was a campground or caravan park at this location previous to this date, likely dating back to the 1940s. Easts Holidays operated a lease at this site for a number of years until 1998. The NSW National Parks & Wildlife Service took over the operation of the tourist park in 1998. Since that time the amount of tree planting, bush regeneration and habitat creation has totally transformed the look and feel of the tourist park.

It was used in the television series, Home & Away from 2009 to 2014.
