= Bianca Scott =

Fictional character from the Australian soap opera Home and Away

- Home and Away character
- Portrayed by: Lisa Gormley
- Duration: 2010–2014, 2016–2017
- First appearance: 9 July 2010
- Last appearance: 3 February 2017
- Introduced by: Cameron Welsh
- Book appearances: Home and Away: An Eye for an Eye
- Spin-off appearances: Home and Away: An Eye for an Eye (2015); Home and Away: Revenge (2016); Home and Away: All or Nothing (2017)
In-universe information
- Occupation: Language teacher Principal of Summer Bay High
- Mother: Joanna Scott
- Half-sisters: April Scott
- Husband: Liam Murphy (2012–2013); Heath Braxton (2013–)
- Sons: Rocco Scott-Braxton
- Stepsons: Harley Braxton
- Stepdaughters: Darcy Callahan

Bianca Scott is a fictional character from the Australian Channel Seven soap opera Home and Away, played by Lisa Gormley. Gormley had recently graduated from NIDA when she secured the role of Bianca, who was introduced as the sister of fellow new character April Scott (Rhiannon Fish). Bianca debuted on-screen during the episode airing on 9 July 2010. Bianca is the daughter of an Italian father and Australian mother. She retains certain Italian traits as she is characterised as a "fiery, opinionated, beautiful, sophisticated" female. Gormley has said that Bianca puts up a feisty attitude to hide her "softer side". Bianca's vice has often been powerful men who break her heart. She arrives in Summer Bay to "nurse a broken heart" after her fiancé, Prince Vittorio Seca (Richard Brancatisano) is unfaithful to her.

Bianca can speak English, Italian and French; she secures employment as a language teacher. She soon meets Liam Murphy (Axle Whitehead). Initially, Bianca does not find happiness with Liam as the serial implemented a "love-triangle storyline", which sees Vittorio return in hope of a reconciliation. This results in Bianca becoming confused as to which man she should be with. The storyline cumulated in the programme's annual cliff-hanger episode where she chooses Liam. Their relationship is a main focus for Bianca's storyline during the early 2011 quarter. However, Liam's drug addiction weakens their relationship. The serial introduced an issue lead storyline for Bianca, in which she becomes drunk and is sexually assaulted by a mystery assailant. The storyline raised awareness of the outcome that binge drinking can hold. Bianca's ordeal ruined her romance with Liam.

Other storylines included a friendship with Gypsy Nash (Kimberley Cooper) and an attraction to local "bad boy" Heath Braxton (Dan Ewing). In late 2011, Bianca featured in a plot in which she fabricates the scene of the car accident and lies to the police. After marrying Liam, Bianca learned she was pregnant with Heath's child. Bianca and Liam ended their marriage and Bianca began a relationship with Heath. Their son died of sudden infant death syndrome, causing Bianca to turn to drugs to block out the pain. She and Heath later married. Some critics from publications such as TV Week and Holy Soap praised Bianca's introduction – stating that she "made an impression" and "impact" on Home and Away. Her relationship with Liam has proved popular with certain critics. After Gormley decided to leave Home and Away, Bianca departed on 12 June 2014. She made a brief appearance for Heath's departure on 29 July 2014. In June 2016, it was confirmed that Gormley had reprised the role for a short stint and Bianca returned on 17 November.

== Character development ==
=== Creation and characterisation ===
In 2010, it was announced that actress Lisa Gormley had joined the cast of Home and Away playing Bianca Scott. The character was created as sister for fellow new character April Scott (Rhiannon Fish). Gormley had just graduated from National Institute of Dramatic Art and the serial quickly signed her up to appear as Bianca. Gormley said that the character is a fun role to portray. Bianca debuted on-screen during the episode airing on 9 July 2010.

Bianca Scott is Italian in every respect. She's fiery, opinionated, beautiful, sophisticated – she's everything her father wished for in a daughter and everything Fellini wished for in a leading lady. However, she's also the product of an Aussie mum who knew how to keep her daughter's arrogance in check with undercutting humour and a healthy dose of reality. Her half-sister April also keeps her 'princess' behaviour in check.

— Yahoo!7 on Bianca

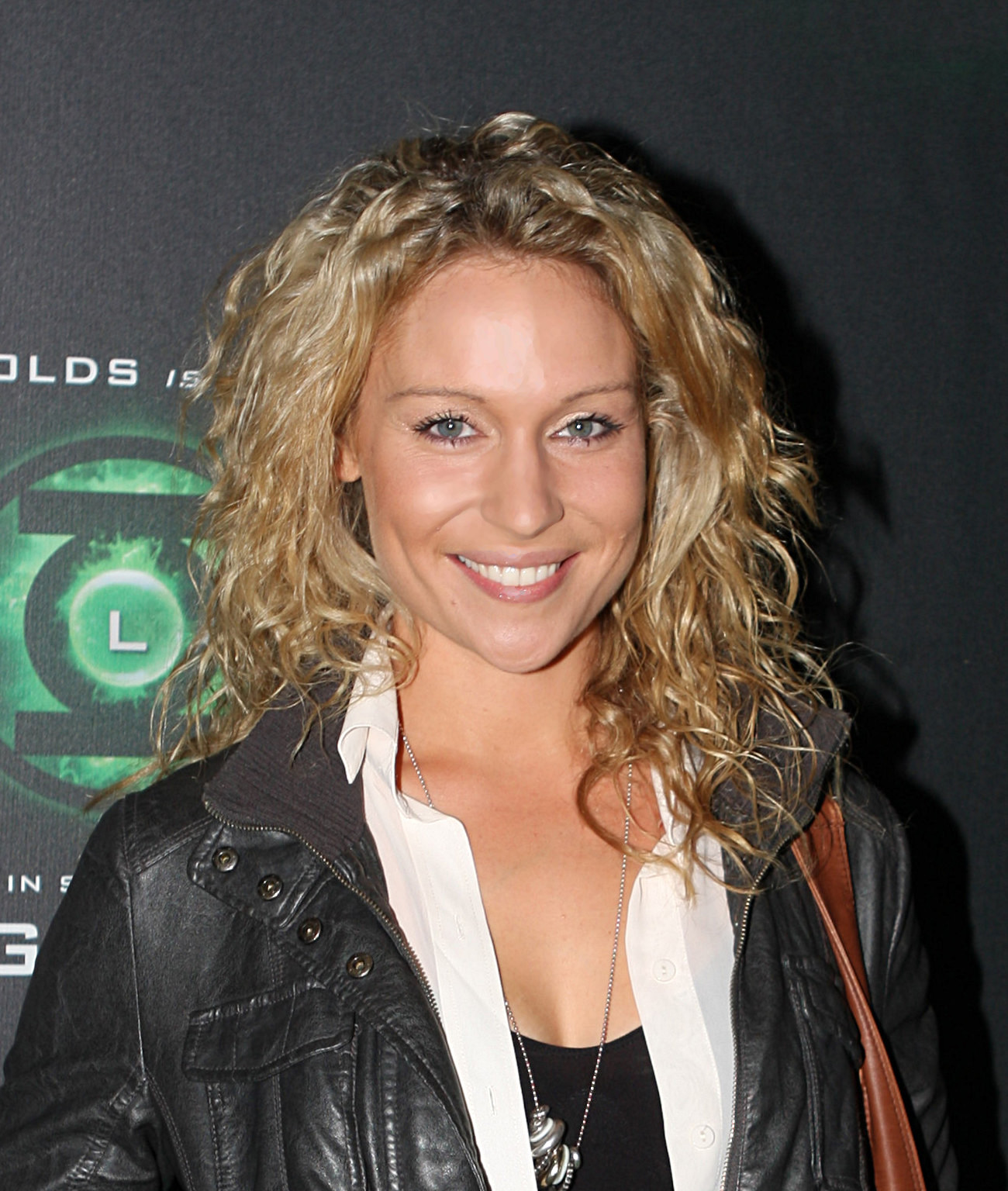
Lisa Gormley (pictured) has said Bianca's feisty persona is a front to hide her "softer side".

Style is an important to Bianca, but she does not care for vanity because she "values intelligence over everything". Bianca can speak English, French and Italian and has used her skill to become a language teacher. She has previously dated men in big career roles such as doctors and Italian royalty. While she is reluctant to give her heart away easily and cannot trust many men, she is passionate about romance. Bianca is not afraid to speak her mind even when she knows she is in the wrong. Bianca and her sister, April, share a mother, Joanna (Tara Morice), but they have different fathers. Bianca's father is Italian while April's is French. Bianca and her sister have a fiery, but supportive relationship. Bianca is often protective over April's choice in men and likes to make sure they treat her right. Bianca has good points and flaws about her personality. Gormley had fun portraying the character from the one-dimensional state of a "feisty blonde Italian" girl to showing why Bianca wants to live in Summer Bay. Gormley summarised Bianca as being "the kind of woman every girl wishes she had the confidence to be". She also opined that Bianca's feisty persona is a front to hide a "softer side". Channel 5 similarly describe her as "Strong, opinionated and beautiful", but attribute her qualities as coming from her parents.

=== Vittorio Seca and Liam Murphy ===
Bianca arrives in Summer Bay to get over a broken heart. Bianca had recently discovered that her fiancé, Prince Vittorio Seca, had cheated on her. Bianca soon develops an attraction to Liam Murphy (Axle Whitehead). Initially Gormley said Bianca views Liam as "a bit of fun" because she is a "little bit broken-hearted" and not looking for love. Bianca wants to gain control of her love life, so she enjoys a "bit of cat and mouse fun" with Liam. Gormley and Whitehead told The Morning Show that Bianca doesn't fall for the "Liam Murphy charm" quite so easily. Whitehead said that Bianca is a "tough nut to crack" for Liam. While Gormley said it was because she had been hurt in the past. It was later announced that Richard Brancatisano has signed up to play Vittorio. The development was described as the start of a "love-triangle storyline", which sees him arrive and attempt to win Bianca back, who in turn romancing Liam. When Vittorio arrives, Bianca realises she has feelings for him and kisses him, causing Liam to leave. Whitehead said that upon Liam's return to the serial he introduces a new girlfriend Nina Bailey (Clare Bowen) to Bianca. Liam "puts on a tough-guy act and pretends everything is cool" while pretending to have moved on. Whitehead opined that Liam is not being truthful with himself and the fact they are both moving on could "spell the end" for their future together.

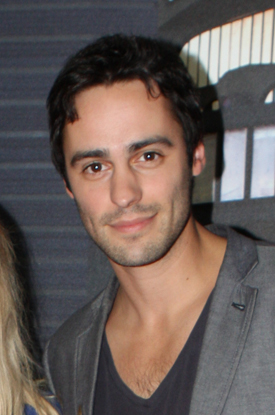
Richard Brancatisano plays Vittorio Seca.

Bianca agrees to marry Vittorio and plans her wedding. However, Liam still has feelings for Bianca and the pair decide to talk about their situation. Whitehead said that his character was "quite sensitive" about the "issue" because he believes Bianca has made the choice to be with Vittorio. The two characters have "very strong feelings" still present and talk about the past. The scenes were described as "hot and steamy" as the pair kiss. Whitehead said it was the start of the build-up to the series finale. He branded it "a really good week of episodes" as Bianca reaches the point she must choose who she wants to be with. Whitehead explained that "Bianca has dismissed what happened between them as an infatuation and tells him that her future is with Vittorio." However, he said that Bianca does not "have the courage to follow her heart". Bianca manages to make it down the altar but cannot take her vows and chooses to be with Liam. The scenes formed the serial's annual "cliff-hanger" episode. While filming the wedding episode, the director chose to play a piece of emotional music. Whitehead said he had to stop himself from crying because he thought the music "perfectly" fitted what the characters were going through. Whitehead said the scenes that follow were a "cool" moment in which Liam puts Bianca "on the back of a Harley and riding off into the sunset". He also said the scenes were fun to play and a personal highlight.

Liam previously battled a drug addiction, which then resurfaces and threatens to ruin Bianca's relationship with him. The serial were highlighting the issue of those closest to drug addicts effectively being unable to help. Whitehead told Digital Spy that not being able to help Liam is "crushing for her". Bianca thinks that "tough love and leaving him to his own devices" was the correct way to approach Liam. However, his addiction takes over and "she can't do anything about it". While Liam is in rehab Bianca sleeps with Heath Braxton (Dan Ewing).

=== Sexual assault ===
In 2011 the serial decided to portray the issue of sexual assault through Bianca. Bianca gets drunk at a "Bachelors & Spintsters Ball" where she is drugged and attacked by a mystery assailant. Gormley explained that Bianca is "heartbroken because she's realised her relationship with Liam Murphy is over". As he has checked out of rehab and not contacted her "Bianca decides to dress up and have a good time". She said that Bianca drinks alcohol to excess to "hide the pain; it's like hitting the self-destruct button". Bianca becomes "oblivious" and flirts with Heath because "she's happy to have attention from anyone". Television journal TV Week noted that is a common reaction to go "on a bender to numb the pain" of losing a partner. However, they said it is not always a "smart" idea because Home and Away portrayed how binge drinking can lead people into "serious trouble".

The next morning Bianca cannot remember who attacked her because she was drugged. Liam later returns to Summer Bay to "mend fences" with Bianca. Though she is "in a pretty bad state herself" and does not want to speak to Liam. Whitehead explained that Liam feels "terrible and wants to support her". He is shocked to learn Heath is a suspect and that Bianca slept with him. He said there was some irony in the storyline because "of all the people she could have ended up with, it had to be Heath Braxton". Heath was Liam's drug dealer so he "hates Heath, he wants him out of his life". Bianca remembers the real identity of her attacker who is revealed to be guest character, Dean O'Mara (Rick Donald) and soon breaks up with Liam.

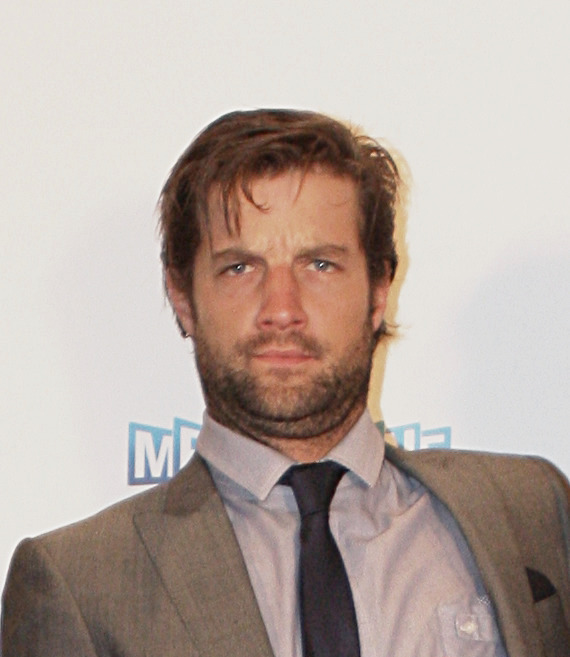
Axle Whitehead (pictured) stars as Bianca's main love interest, Liam Murphy.

=== Friendship with Gypsy Nash ===
Bianca later forms a friendship with Gypsy Nash (Kimberley Cooper), Cooper said that off-screen she had become best friends with Gormley too. Gormley said it was good to have another "strong willed female" living with Bianca. She is someone for her to go out and have a drink with. While Cooper stated that Gypsy's first impression of Bianca is "at least she is not as uptight as her sister" Gypsy has trouble with her daughter Lily Smith (Charlie-Rose McLennan) and does not get on with April. They both explained that the pair bond over drinks as Bianca "moves Gypsy from the firing line" and helps her.

Gormley opined that Gypsy is "hot stuff" and Liam is single, so Bianca has "suspicions" about Gypsy stealing Liam. She added that it causes a "tension" and Liam likes the idea of "two girls fighting over one man". However, in "classic Bianca fashion" she pretends that she does not care and Cooper said that because of this "Gypsy doesn't even notice" an issue. Though Liam is "obviously still in love with Bianca". Gormley and Cooper predicted that viewers would like Bianca and Gypsy's double act because they "had so much fun" filming the storyline. Whitehead said that Liam is attracted to Gypsy's "energy and spirit" and he thinks he has lost Bianca. Liam assumes Bianca is sleeping with Heath and this is the "final straw" for Liam. He has a deep conversation with Gypsy and they kiss, only for Bianca to find them together. Whitehead said that "it's pretty embarrassing for everyone". The incident has bigger implications because "Bianca and Gypsy also have to deal with this" and the effect it has on their friendship.

=== Relationship with Heath Braxton ===
It was later reported that Bianca's sister, April would begin "dabbling in drugs" due to exam stress. Bianca first hears about April's drug use from Heath. Gormley said that Bianca cannot believe it because she does not think it is something April would do. However, despite Liam's concerns she soon realises that Heath is telling the truth and Bianca sees a new side to Heath. Gormley said that "Bianca is so proud she's started seeing this good side of Heath and is disappointed that Liam's still judging him on face value, like she did initially, she defends him because he did good." Bianca thinks that Heath is "hard done by" and the only way to show her "appreciation" in Heath's world is to kiss him. Ewing said that the reason Heath is honest is because he "cares about Bianca so much". Though, Heath is not sure whether he can do the "settle down" scenario yet, Ewing said "he loves her, whether he knows it or not. I certainly think Heath's extremely attracted to her because he's never met anyone like her." Gormley said that there is definitely chemistry present between Bianca and Heath and noted that viewers picked up on it too. However, she felt that there were so many "pros and cons" and too many cons for Bianca to seriously consider a relationship with him. She concluded that Bianca is still "very much in love with Liam".

"She's angry and scared and doesn't know what to do. Is she really going to lie to the police and the man she loves? There's no good way out of it."

— Gormley on Bianca's dilemma. (2011)

Bianca is later involved in a storyline in which she lies to the police. The plot features an ensemble of the serial's characters as they fabricate the scene of a car accident which leaves Liam seriously injured. The storyline plays out as Bianca's police officer friend Charlie Buckton (Esther Anderson) and her secret lover Darryl Braxton (Steve Peacocke) crash into Liam. While Bianca and Heath are travelling in the car behind them, they are forced to involve the police. However, Charlie is not allowed to be seen with a known criminal such as Darryl. To protect them, Bianca and Heath tell the police they were driving the vehicle. However, for Bianca the storyline has bigger implications to her relationship with Liam. Gormley said "this is the man she cares so much for and she comes face-to-face with losing him and it's devastating – she's so scared she might lose him." Anderson revealed that Charlie is worried her friendship with Bianca will be ruined by the lie. The characters realise the truth would have "monumental" consequences, so they decide to continue with the lie.

=== Departure ===
On 10 October 2013, Gormley's agent Mark Morrissey revealed that she would leave Australia following the expiration of her contract in December 2013. He added that Gormley had already signed with a United States-based management firm. On 17 March 2014, Sophie Dainty from Digital Spy said that Gormley was thought to have finished filming with Home and Away. Gormley revealed that she would be enjoying her free time after leaving Home and Away and would be auditioning, teaching and travelling. She thanked the fans for accepting Bianca and added that she was proud of the work she had done during her time with the show. Bianca departed on 12 June 2014, but she made a brief return in July for Heath's exit.

=== Return ===
Gormley reprised her role for a feature-length spin-off called Home and Away: An Eye for an Eye in late 2015. She told Shannon Molloy of news.com.au that she was open to a Home and Away return at some point, but did not think it would be for a while, as she wanted to try out new things first. In June 2016, it was announced that Gormley had agreed to reprise the role, alongside Ewing at Heath, for a short stint later in the year. Ewing called the couple's return storyline "a great, fun opportunity". Gormley made her screen return as Bianca during the episode broadcast on 17 November.

== Storylines ==
Bianca arrives in Summer Bay to start working at the school as their new language teacher. Bianca had run away from her fiancé Vittorio, an Italian Prince, after discovering he had been unfaithful. Bianca starts to flirt with fellow teacher Liam and they develop an attraction. Bianca has a burst pipe in her new home and argues with her landlord. Speaking in Italian, she threatens to burn the property down, but the landlord understands and evicts her. Gina Austin (Sonia Todd) lets Bianca and April move in with her, however, she soon becomes annoyed with Bianca who refuses to get along with John Palmer (Shane Withington). After Gina asks them to leave they move in with Irene Roberts (Lynne McGranger). Bianca discovers that Ruby Buckton (Rebecca Breeds) is in love with Liam. Bianca warns Liam to stop spending time with Ruby. She tells Ruby to get over her crush and informs Charlie Buckton (Esther Anderson) about her behaviour. Bianca slaps Liam after he insults her and Gina forces them to work in the library together. Bianca starts to receive text messages from Vittorio and she admits that she still loves him, even though she goes on a date with Liam.

Vittorio arrives in Summer Bay and though she is angry at first, Bianca gives into her feelings and kisses him. Liam sees the kiss and leaves town. Vittorio arranges a press conference and reveals he is in town to win Bianca back. Bianca tells Vittorio that she does not want Liam any more and Bianca accepts Vittorio's proposal of marriage. Liam's friend, Romeo Smith (Luke Mitchell), criticises her for forgetting about Liam. Vittorio tells Bianca that he is going back to Italy, but he changes his mind. Liam leaves a message for Bianca, asking her to get in touch if she is still interested. She does not, but sits listening to the call. When Liam returns, he develops a rivalry with Vittorio. Liam and Bianca kiss and he confesses his love for her. Bianca decides to stay with Vittorio and carries on with the wedding arrangements. However, the encounter causes Bianca to become confused about what she wants. During her wedding, Bianca makes it to the altar, but halfway through her vows, she tells Vittorio she cannot marry him. She runs into Liam's arms and they ride off on his motorbike.

Upon their return, Bianca and Liam move into an outdoor home. They have sex every day, until Liam becomes worn out and decides to concentrate on his music. Bianca thinks he has lost interest in her, but he soon convinces her otherwise. Bianca starts to tire of not having a proper home to live in and when she electrocutes herself, she moves back in with Irene. Liam starts taking drugs again and Bianca tries to help him. When Liam loses his job, Bianca tells him she will only stand by him if he kicks his habit. When he does not, she breaks up with him. Liam checks into rehab and Bianca changes her mind, but Liam refuses to speak to her until he recovers. Bianca goes to the B&S Ball and is raped. Bianca refuses to talk about her ordeal despite Irene and April's attempts to help. Liam returns and supports Bianca, but she still cannot open up. Bianca sees her attacker, Dean O'Mara, and he runs her over. Liam tracks Dean down and he is arrested. Bianca and Liam break up, but Bianca is jealous when she sees him having sex with Gypsy Nash. Gypsy later tells Bianca that Liam is not over her. Charlie and Bianca decide to stay in a cabin in the country. Brax and his brother, Heath, join them and Heath has sex with Bianca.

As they are returning home, Brax and Charlie crash into Liam, who comes off his motorbike. Bianca stays by Liam's side while he recovers in the hospital. She and Heath tell the police they were in the car that hit Liam, to protect Brax and Charlie. Bianca rejects Heath and she convinces Liam that Charlie and Brax were not in the car. Bianca's friendship with Charlie deteriorates as a result of the deception. Bianca asks Liam to move in when he is discharged from hospital. Bianca offers to lend him some money to buy a car, but she is displeased when he purchases a motorbike instead. Liam is furious with Bianca when he learns the truth about his accident and he moves back to the caravan park. However, the couple reunite and Liam proposes to Bianca, who accepts. Bianca is shocked to find out that April has been seeing Heath and warns her sister to stay away from him. Bianca is late to her wedding, when she tries to talk to Heath about April and they are chased by a paparazzo. Upon her return from her honeymoon, Bianca discovers that she is pregnant. Heath asks her is the baby is his, but she says no. However, at her scan she finds out the baby is further along than she thought. Bianca and Liam try to keep the news from Heath, but April tells him the baby is his.

Bianca and Liam decide to leave the Bay, but Liam realises that it is not what Bianca wants and he ends their marriage. Bianca develops Pre-eclampsia and is admitted to hospital. Sid Walker (Robert Mammone) tells her and Heath that the baby will have to be born early. Shortly before she goes into theatre, Bianca has a seizure and the doctors perform a caesarean section. When Bianca wakes up, she believes her baby has died, despite Heath taking her to meet their son. Sid then diagnoses her with postnatal psychosis. Bianca leaves to find Liam, forcing Sid to sedate her to get her back to the hospital. When Bianca comes round, she cannot remember the past few days and finally acknowledges the existence of her son. The baby has a fit and has to have a blood transfusion. Bianca and Heath decide to name their son Rocco. When Rocco is allowed home, Bianca and Heath decide to move into Irene's together, which makes Heath's daughter, Darcy (Alea O'Shea), feel left out. Bianca returns to work part-time, while Heath looks after Rocco. Rocco falls ill with meningitis, but recovers. The family move into the Braxton house and Bianca clashes with Heath's mother, Cheryl (Suzi Dougherty).

When Bianca goes to wake Rocco up for a feed, she finds he has died from cot death. Both Heath and Bianca struggle to come to terms with Rocco's death. Bianca breaks up with Heath and begins self-destructing. She begins taking drugs, which are supplied by Adam Sharpe (Martin Lynes). Bianca has sex with Adam, moves into his place and begins partying. April manages to make Bianca realise what she is doing and Bianca stops. Adam orders Heath to be killed, but he is found in time. Bianca visits Heath in hospital and they reunite. Heath proposes and Bianca initially refuses, but changes her mind and proposes to him. Bianca supports Heath when Darcy's grandmother refuses to give him access to her. Bianca becomes acting principal of the high school when Gina dies. Bianca is demoted when she defies the department to make a statement about Zac MacGuire (Charlie Clausen), who was being accused of sexual harassment by a student. However, a protest by the students sees Bianca reinstated as principal. Bianca becomes attracted to Zac, who also has feelings for her. Bianca tells Heath that they should postpone the wedding. Feeling he might be to blame, Zac apologises and Bianca realises how much she loves Heath. During their wedding, Heath takes Bianca aside and confesses to cheating on her. Bianca punches Heath and declares their relationship is over. However, realising the part she played in Heath's betrayal, Bianca stops him from leaving town and they get back together. They marry the following day.

Despite her initial concerns, Heath manages to convince Bianca to merge Summer Bay High and Mangrove River High when Mangrove River is burnt down in a mysterious accident. However, Bianca clashes with Mangrove River's principal, the prickly Jade Montgomery (Tasma Walton), who is put out when she discovers that Bianca will become the principal of both schools during the merger. Montgomery also has a vendetta against Heath, one of her old students, and believes Bianca will not be able to control the Mangrove River students. On the first day of the merger, Bianca's office is trashed by rebellious student Matt Page (Alec Snow). When Bianca learns that Heath fathered a child when he had a one-night stand with Jess Lockwood (Georgia Chara), she struggles to accept his son, Harley. After Jess dies, Heath gets custody of his son. Bianca struggles to bond with Harley and snatches Rocco's old teddy bear back when Heath uses it to cheer Harley up. Bianca moves into Leah's and asks Heath to bring Harley to her when the Braxtons are being targeted by someone. When Harley cries, Nate Cooper (Kyle Pryor) convinces Bianca to hold him. She finally bonds with her stepson and accepts him, knowing that Harley will never replace Rocco.

Bianca asks for a transfer to a different school after Heath asks for a divorce. However, after they reconcile she attempts to revoke the request, but learns it has already been approved. Heath confronts her about it after he accidentally finds the transfer request. He tells Bianca that she should go for a new start and he will follow her soon. Bianca then leaves Summer Bay for her new job in Sydney. She returns a few weeks later to accompany Heath and the children to the city.

Two years later, Bianca comes to the Bay for a visit and she spends the day catching up with Nate and befriended with Tori Morgan (Penny McNamee), who thought Bianca was Nate's ex, but Nate assume that he and Bianca are just friends. She later admits to Irene that she and Heath are having marital problems, as Heath is keeping things from her and she feels lonely. Bianca noticed that Nate has a thing for Tori and convince him to win Tori over.

== Reception ==
For her portrayal of Bianca, Gormley was short-listed for the "Most Popular New Female Talent" award at the 2011 Logie Awards. The 2010 season finale based around Bianca's impending wedding to Vittorio won the Australian Writer's Guild Award for "Best Television Serial" and was presented to the episode's writer, Series Producer Cameron Welsh. The episode's director Geoffrey Nottage won the Australian Directors' Guild Award for "Best Direction in a Television Serial". The search to find the identity of Bianca's attacker was nominated for "Best Mystery" at the 2012 All About Soap Bubble Awards. At the 2012 Inside Soap Awards, Gormley was nominated for "Best Daytime Star". She was longlisted for the same award at the 2014 Inside Soap Awards.

Before Bianca arrived on British screens, Holy Soap predicted that viewers would enjoy watching "feisty" Bianca's "antics". They opined that she "made an impression straight away" and branded her most memorable moment as "arriving on a moped and in a racy red dress". Carolyn Stewart writing for TV Week said that Bianca made quite an impact on Home and Away. She said she liked the fact she was the first character to acknowledge and criticise Liam for chewing his trademark toothpick. She also said she would be happy for her to stay around "for a long time". A columnist of the Daily Record said "whoever said the course of true love runs smooth had clearly never paid a visit to Summer Bay" and seen Bianca's Liam/Vittorio dilemma. They opined that "life could be hard for Bianca" because she actually had "two very lovely men falling at her feet".

A writer of The Sun-Herald observed the beginning of Bianca and Liam's relationship as being "blissfully removed" from the serial's usual drama. They correctly predicted that happiness "does not make for good soap fodder and the lovebirds can only avoid the Summer Bay vortex for so long." As Jim Schembri writing for The Age said that Liam was "nuts" and had "a screw loose" when he tires of having sex with her. He said it was "weird behaviour" to rather drink camomile tea than succumb to a woman like Bianca's advances.

Stewart later said that she was happy Bianca gave Heath "the flick" because she thought she should be with Liam. She said it was easy to be "lovey-dovey" while Liam is in a coma, but it would be a "whole different ball game" if he was awake.
