= John Palmer (Home and Away) =

- Home and Away character
- Portrayed by: Shane Withington; Rex Palazzi (flashbacks)
- Duration: 2009–present
- First appearance: 27 March 2009
- Introduced by: Cameron Welsh
In-universe information
- Occupation: Councillor; Lifeguard; Surf Club manager; Bus driver/tour guide; Foster parent; Celebrant
- Father: George Palmer
- Mother: Enid Palmer
- Wife: Jenena Palmer (until 2009); Gina Austin (2010–2013); Marilyn Chambers (2014–2021)
- Daughters: Shandi Ayres
- Adoptive sons: Jett James
- Stepsons: Trey Palmer; Xavier Austin

John Palmer is a fictional character from the Australian soap opera Home and Away, played by Shane Withington. He made his first appearance during the episode broadcast on 27 March 2009. Withington was introduced as a recurring cast member for twelve weeks. John was initially an angry father, but Withington thought that the character would not last if he continued that way, so began portraying him as "funny and very human". John is also egotistical and insecure. He has worked several jobs during his time in Summer Bay, including managing the Juice Bar and working as a Surf Life Saver. The character was married to school principal Gina Austin (Sonia Todd) and they fostered Jett James (Will McDonald). Following Gina's death, John married Marilyn Chambers (Emily Symons) in 2014.

== Casting ==
Withington had previously guest starred in Home and Away as helicopter pilot Colin Page. He began playing John Palmer, a recurring guest role in 2009. He was initially only signed to the show for twelve weeks. The character was said to be a "strict father to his stepson" Trey Palmer (Luke Bracey), and a member of the surf lifesaving club.

In February 2012 Withington signed a three-year contract with the serial. He later told Holly Richards from The West Australian that he was content in remaining part of the cast because he had the chance to work on a daily basis.

== Character development ==
"John Palmer is a loveable larrikin, he likes to think he is a capable handyman, but an electrician he is not, which was highlighted when he blew up the fuse box on Indi and Romeo's opening night of the Gym. However he has tried his hand at a few things, running for council, managing the Juice Bar and working as a Surf Life Saver. He can be very competitive [...and] his past relationships were complicated."

— Yahoo!7 on John (2012)

A writer for Channel 5 described John as having "his hand in a number of the town's prized pies: a member of the surf lifesaving club, he was first elected to the local council and then bought the gym." Withington told a reporter from Home and Away Official Collector's Edition that John was initially an angry dad. He thought that "an angry guy isn't going to last" in the show and decided to make John "funny and very human". He described John as being vain, egotistical and insecure. Art director Marianne Evans has revealed that she enjoys working Withington because he brings a "natural style" to the role.

In May 2011, Michael Idato writing for The Sydney Morning Herald reported that Grant Dodwell had been cast as Gary O'Connor, the boss of the Mangrove River surf club. Gary arrives to take on John at the surf carnival. Withington and Dodwell had previously worked together on A Country Practice and Dodwell told Idato that working with Withington on the storyline was "just like old times".

John was married to Gina Austin (Sonia Todd) and Withington credits the mutual respect between himself and Todd as creating a successful dynamic between the two characters. Todd added that Withington acts as her "bridge" to get her into the right place for the drama. In 2012, John and Gina take Jett James (Will McDonald) into their care. However he later moves in with his biological father Richard Bozic (Radek Jonak) and this causes problems in John's marriage. The predicament becomes more difficult when John lies to Gina about spending an evening spent drinking with Marilyn Chambers (Emily Symons). Withington told The West Australian's Richards that "He has got a lot of love in his heart for Jett, he genuinely does love him but there's friction there all the way." He also described the situation a "very tough" for John and Gina and revealed that there would be "some hard drama" ahead. Withington told Erin Miller from TV Week that Gina thinks that Marilyn is after John, despite his protests that she is wrong. He added that "their marriage has lost its sparkle; John has been feeling a bit rejected and a bit left out and he sees Marilyn as someone he can be friends with." John is "lonely" and his marriage does not appear to be working out. Marilyn is just there being "cute and available". Withington explained that "John tries it on rather foolishly and then hates himself for what he has done". He also noted that they were keen to not portray Marilyn as a "home wrecker", but she does like John. He also teased that the storyline would continue with more "high drama" for the three characters. Withington found the storyline challenging because he had to play to storyline so John would not be seen as betraying Gina.

After the death of Gina in March 2013 John begins a relationship with Marilyn. She finds it awkward when John suggests they move in together, but they agree it is too soon but acknowledge that their relationship is working. The wedding announcement came one year after Gina's final scenes were broadcast. Home and Away publicity told a reporter from Inside Soap that "while it's true that Gina's sad passing wasn't all that long ago, John's been given a second chance at love - so he's going to grab it with both hands."

== Storylines ==
John married Jenena (Anna Lise Phillips) and he became stepfather to Trey. When Trey is institutionalised after suffering a breakdown, John and Jenena's marriage breaks down and they both leave town. John returns and he is elected to the local council and he buys the gym. When John insults Romeo Smith (Luke Mitchell) one day, Mink Carpenter (Matylda Buczko) punches him. A few weeks later Romeo's mother, Jill Carpenter (Josephine Mitchell), arrives in town and she and John have a brief relationship. John begins a relationship with Gina Austin (Sonia Todd), which makes her son, Xavier (David Jones-Roberts) unhappy. Things between John and Xavier become tense, but they eventually start to get on. John proposes to Gina, but, to his shock, he is rejected. Shandi Ayres (Samantha Tolj) comes to the Bay and tells John that she is his daughter. When Bianca Scott (Lisa Gormley) runs out of her wedding to Vittorio Seca (Richard Brancatisano), Gina whispers in John's ear to say there will be a wedding between John and herself. They marry and John runs out of the chapel with Gina in his arms. John later discovers Shandi is actually a con woman called Daria Hennesy. His real daughter, Shandi Palmer (Elizabeth Blackmore), turns up and they meet.

John organises the surf carnival and becomes competitive against the Mangrove River team. However the event ends in his competitor's captain, Gary collapsing from a heart attack. John supports Gina through her many problems with Xavier when he wants attend festivals and moves to the countryside. John is present during a fight which erupts in the surf club involving the River Boys. He is punched to the ground and kicked in the face. While recovering at home a storm crosses Summer Bay. John is left home alone when his spleen ruptures as a result of the attack. He tries to call for help but passes out. Sasha Bezmel (Demi Harman) enters the Austin house for shelter, finding John unconscious on the floor. She calls him an ambulance and after surgery he is sent home to recover. John begins a feud with Harvey Ryan (Marcus Graham) when they both enter the local election. John is angry when Harvey tries to get him fired from his bus driving job. Harvey wins the election. John invests money in the resort for Dennis Harling (Daniel Roberts). Harvey later ruins the plans for the resort. John asks for his money from Dennis, but he flees without paying him back. Gina is angry that John did not feel he could tell her about the investment.

John and Gina begin arguing and John briefly moves in with Alf Stewart (Ray Meagher). Marilyn Chambers and Roo Stewart (Georgie Parker) get annoyed with his laziness and they convince Gina to take him back. John encounters Jett James when he steals from people on the beach. Jett later steals from Marilyn and John reports him to the police. Gina invites Jett to stay when his mother dies and he starts to bond with the family. Xavier decides to move away to be closer to the police academy. John then takes Jett under his wing and he and Gina decide to foster him. Jett meets his father, Richard Bozic, who initially rejects him. John starts to train Jett for the swim carnival, leading Gina to think that he is trying to take Jett's mind off his father. Gina tricks John and Jett into talking to school counsellor, Natalie Davison (Catherine Mack-Hancock). John becomes annoyed with Gina, but they eventually reconcile. John and Gina plan to adopt Jett, but Richard gets in touch and states that he wants his son. Gina and John say goodbye to Jett, but a couple of weeks later, Richard allows him to return. John thinks that Gina and Jett are leaving him out of their celebrations. He confides in Marilyn and they get drunk. He lies to Gina and says that he got drunk in a meeting, but Marilyn accidentally reveals the truth. Gina confronts John over being dishonest and she later accuses Marilyn of having an affair with John. He moves out but Gina asks him to return when he injures himself doing maintenance on the house.

Gina and John decide to adopt Jett. Richard flies in and tells them that he does not want to give up on his son. This angers Jett and he accuses Richard of not wanting anyone else to have him. Richard relents and the adoption goes ahead. However, on the drive to the court to finalize the adoption, Gina begins suffering from a headache and hallucinations of herself. Gina suddenly stops the car, falls unconscious and dies from an aneurysm. John thinks he cannot look after Jett any longer but Marilyn decides to look after them while they grieve. John becomes dependent on her and Alf and Roo warn Marilyn to distance herself from him. John becomes upset with Marilyn for thinking he could move on from Gina so soon. The pair later reconcile but Jett disapproves of them spending time together, especially when they begin a bus touring business. They later begin a relationship and Jett gives his approval. John and Marilyn get engaged and finally marry in front of their friends and family. At the reception, Jett asks them to adopt him and the adoption is finalised a couple of weeks later. In 2015, John was furious at Jett for driving his lifeguard cart into a tent of a caravan park and tells new cop, Katarina Chapman (Pia Miller) to get Jett into trouble, but realised that he had upset him and John apologised. John was not happy when Chris told him that Josh Barrett (Jackson Gallagher) spray-painted a mural on the wall of the Surf Club for his girlfriend, Evelyn MacGuire (Philippa Northeast). Jett, Marilyn and the residents of the Bay thought it was nice, but John and Chris disagrees and attempts to clean it off. But Evelyn, Josh and Jett stops them and Evelyn threatens Chris and John that the mural will be removed over her dead body and the trio used their bodies as a human shield to protect the mural and many students join in to save it, including Marilyn.

John brings Katarina to the mural and give Evelyn a warning, but Katarina said that the students didn't break the law and there was nothing she can do to stop them. The next day, the students gave up by Alf, letting John and Chris remove the mural. Marilyn was upset about this and refused to talk to him. John realised how much Marilyn was hurt and decided to a romantic gesture to win her back. John and Marilyn reconciles and Jett tells John and Marilyn that he's going to military boarding school and John receives a new apron from him on the day of Jett's departure. When Marilyn was electrocuted at the diner and lost her memories of him and their marriage and mistook John for her ex-husband Fisher, leaving her memories stranded in 1996. Months later, Marilyn remembers him after remembered their wedding day. John and Marilyn renew their vows and Marilyn goes off to travel around the world. Jett returns to the bay and John meets Jett's new girlfriend, Skye Peters (Marlo Kelly). Skye told John that she ran away from home because her mother, Carol was abusing her and blaming her for the death of her other daughter, Lisa. In 2016, John found Skye in his house, learning that Carol continues to abuse Skye and allows her to stay. John calls the police to arrest Carol, but Carol was soon released. John left Skye alone in the house for a few hours and Carol tries to take Skye back. John returns home and sees the police arresting Carol at his driveway and felt guilty that he left Skye all alone, but luckily Oscar MacGuire (Jake Speer), came to Skye's rescue. John offers Skye to move in with him while Carol's in a psychiatric hospital, and Skye accepts and John fosters her. Nate Cooper (Kyle Pryor, his fiancee Ricky Sharpe (Bonnie Sveen) and her son, Casey moved into John's house. John gets a phone call from Italy that Marilyn injured her leg and John decided to fly there to look after her and leaves Skye under Irene's care.

A few weeks later, John returns home and Skye moves back in. John learns Skye is dating Tank Snelgrove (Reece Milne), the boy who kidnapped Evelyn and punched Josh. John orders Skye to stay away from Tank and tells Tank's father, Greg Snelgrove (Paul Gleeson) to keep his son away from Skye. John finds a letter from Skye saying that she has left the Bay with Tank. A week later, Skye returns home to collect the rest of her stuff and John begs her to stay, but Skye declines, saying she wants to be with Tank. When Alf suffers a heart attack and a stroke, Marilyn returns him to support him. John tells Marilyn that he wants to foster another child and they foster Jordan Walsh (Benny Turland). John initially tries too hard to befriend Jordan, but he later offers him a job at the juice bar and they bond. John and Marilyn's house is burgled by Jordan's father. He apologises and Jordan decides to give him a second chance, so they leave for the city. After Hunter King (Scott Lee) fails his Bronze Medallion test, he smashes John's radio. John unintentionally sets fire to Hunter's caravan and soon apologises when Hunter gets the blame. John collapses outside the Surf Club and is hospitalised. Soon, John starts committing arson around the Bay. He sets the bush alight during the Summer Grooves music festival, and the smoke contributes to Billie Ashford's (Tessa de Josselin) early death. Kat works out John is behind the arson attacks. John collapses and is told that he has a brain tumour. He undergoes surgery and learns that he is the Bay's arsonist. He receives abuse from the community and is fired from his job, until Alf steps in and gets it back for him. VJ Patterson (Matt Little), decides to forgive John despite his actions but it does little to make John change his mind. Martin Ashford (George Mason), pushes John against a pylon and badly injures him, having to be restrained by Patrick Stanwood (Luke McKenzie), and causing John to undergo a checkup at the hospital. After having a talk with Patrick, Ash eventually forgives John. Although Marilyn assures him that their lives are back on track, John still decides to leave the bay. John then attends his trial and despite having Morag Bellingham (Cornelia Frances) to represent him, John is found guilty and given jail time. John is sent to prison for arson and Billie's death. During visiting hours, a fellow inmate sexually harasses Marilyn, and John starts a fight in retaliation.

John tells Marilyn news that Jett is getting married and he wants to pay for it for him as a gift. Marilyn who tells him she also wants to help out but he says not to bother, this causes Marilyn to become a brand ambassador for Stunning Organics. As Marilyn tries to make many with selling her product it becomes harder when the company doesn't take her calls and ignores her to the point boxes pile up. Marilyn who is staying at Irene's house has a brick thrown threw the window as John was keeping her company. Later on as the company finally agree to stop sending her boxes Marilyn decides to throw them out, unbeknownst to her one of the boxes had a bomb planted in it, Marilyn learns what the company are up to when she is sent a text of the bomb she tries to call John and tell him but he doesn't answer. When Mali catches up to them he yells for Roo and John to get out of the van and when they do the van explodes. Mali, Roo and John are taken to hospital and are treated, but Roo has to be flown to the city hospital as she has neck injuries. Marilyn blames herself and says that it should've been her, John says that it shouldn't have been anyone, John undergoes surgery for internal bleeding and suffers a bout of SVT while in ICU, John realises that when he was having his attack having Irene there made him feel happy again.

While John is released from hospital he is told by Bree that he needs to be with someone while he recovers, Irene agrees to take him in and when he moves in he says that he is only going to stay a couple of days as he doesn't want to put Irene out, Irene tells him that it is fine and asks him what's up, John says that moment in the hospital left him shaken. John and Irene later hear rumours that they are 'dating' and both of them think that it is a crazy assumption, Irene has idea and tells him to play along, the two are spotted at dinner together.

Later John supports Irene during her legal trouble after she is arrested for helping Dana and Harper. John during Irene's trial asks Irene's lawyer to do something as Irene faces years behind bars. Irene confides in John that she is scared of what's about to come. The following morning John is pleased when Irene's charges are dropped by the judge.

== Reception ==
John and Marilyn's wedding won the 2015 TV Week and Soap Extra #OMGAward for Best Wedding. In 2022, Withington received a nomination for Best Daytime Star at the Inside Soap Awards. A columnist for the Western Mail was left unimpressed when John's attitude towards April Scott's (Rhiannon Fish) recycling plans. They stated: "Just when we had started to put all our doubts about John Palmer to one side and were beginning to believe that he'd turned over a new leaf he goes and shows us where his selfish priorities really lie." Joe Brett from Holy Soap opined that John was a "wicked stepfather" to Trey. An Inside Soap writer branded them a popular pairing.
