= Esther Anderson (Australian actress) =

Australian actress and model (born 1979)

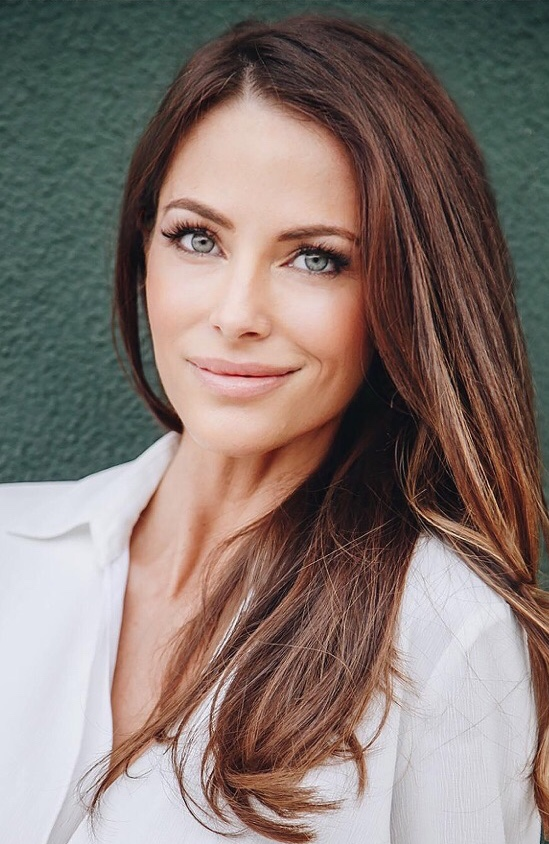
- Born: Esther Jackie Anderson; 13 June 1979 (age 47); Geelong, Victoria, Australia
- Occupations: Actress; Model
- Years active: 2007–present
- Spouse: Howard Moggs (m. 2017)
- Children: 2

Esther Jackie Anderson (born 13 June 1979) is an Australian actress and model, best known for her role as Charlie Buckton on the Australian soap opera Home and Away from 2008 until 2012. She was nominated for two Gold Logie Awards in 2010 and 2012. After leaving Home and Away, Anderson starred in the NBC television drama Siberia and was a contestant on The Celebrity Apprentice Australia.

== Early life ==
Anderson was born on 13 June 1979 and she grew up in Geelong. Anderson is a model and she lived in Japan for six years, travelling between the country and Europe for work. She appeared in a number of television commercials in Japan, which led her to move to Melbourne to take acting courses, as she wanted to begin acting and presenting.

== Career ==
In 2007, Anderson landed a presenting role on the Victorian version of Australian travel show Postcards. A year later, she secured an audition for television soap opera Home and Away and was cast as police constable Charlie Buckton. Producers introduced a lesbian plot for Charlie and Kate Bell's character Joey Collins to boost the shows ratings. It was Anderson's first big storyline and she was required to work more hours. The storyline was criticised by religious and conservative family groups, and Channel Seven later cut a kiss between the characters. Anderson earned four Logie Award nominations for her work on Home and Away, including two Gold Logie Awards. She quit Home and Away in 2011 and filmed her final scenes in August that year. She moved to Los Angeles for work in 2012.

Anderson stars in short film Breathless as Jodie, a woman in mourning over her deceased child. In August 2012, it was announced Anderson had landed a role in the NBC television drama Siberia, which was filmed in Canada. The series masquerades as a reality show, with the actors using their own names as they play a group of contestants who compete for a cash prize in the Siberian wilderness. Anderson reprised her role as Charlie Buckton in 2013 for "a handful of episodes".

In 2014, Anderson was cast in her first feature film Broken Contract by writer-director James Pentecost. She stars opposite Christopher Morris as Detective Keeling, an internal affairs cop. Broken Contract was filmed in Perth, Australia. The following year, Anderson was a contestant on the fourth season of The Celebrity Apprentice Australia. Anderson made a guest appearance in Netflix series GLOW, and appears in 2019 films Apple Seed and Madness in the Method. In 2021, she appeared in the Channel 9 series Amazing Grace.

Anderson made a guest appearance as Dr Sian Caton on the Australian television soap opera Neighbours in June 2022.

== Personal life ==
Anderson was in a relationship with fellow Home and Away actor Conrad Coleby from 2008 until 2010, and with footballer Joel Selwood in 2012. She began dating advertising executive Howard Moggs in December 2014. They got engaged in February 2016, and married in Geelong in February 2017. In April 2018, Anderson announced she was expecting the couple's first child, and she gave birth to their son in August. In April 2022, Anderson confirmed she and Moggs were expecting their second child, and she gave birth to their second son on 28 September 2022.

== Filmography ==
Year	Title	Role	Notes
2008–2012, 2013	Home and Away	Charlie Buckton	Main cast
2010	Breathless	Jodie Layersmith	Short film
2012	The Next Big Thing	Janet	Short film
2013	Siberia	Esther	Main cast
2014	Half Sisters	Baby Shower Guest	Guest role
2015	Wait	Sam	Voice role
2017	GLOW	Carolyn	Guest role
2017	Lifeline	Mimi	Guest role
2018	Broken Contract	Detective Keeling	Film
2019	Apple Seed	Regan	Film
2019	Madness in the Method	Georgie M. Anderson	Film
2019	Airplane Mode	Uncredited	Voice over
2021	Amazing Grace	Martha	Guest role
2022	Everything in Between	Linda	Film
2022	Neighbours	Sian Caton	Guest

== Awards and nominations ==
Year	Association	Category	Work	Result	Ref
2010	Inside Soap Awards	Best Daytime Star	Home and Away	Nominated	
2010	Logie Awards	Most Popular Personality on Australian Television	Home and Away	Nominated	
2010	Logie Awards	Most Popular Actress	Home and Away	Nominated	
2011	Inside Soap Awards	Best Daytime Star	Home and Away	Nominated	
2012	Logie Awards	Most Popular Personality on Australian Television	Home and Away	Nominated	
2012	Logie Awards	Most Popular Actress	Home and Away	Nominated	
2019	Los Angeles Film Awards	Best Actress in an Indie Film	Breathless	Won	
2019	New York Film Awards	Best Actress in an Indie Film	Breathless	Won	
