= VJ Patterson =

- Home and Away character
- Matthew Little as VJ (2016)
- Portrayed by: Carlo Teodorowych & Jack Monger; Max Theoharis & Marcus Spinetti; Jack Riddle; Harry & James Roberts; Nicholas & Cameron Stevens; Cooper Scott; Felix Dean (2007–2014); Matthew Little (2014–2024)
- Duration: 2001–2018, 2024
- First appearance: 30 November 2001
- Last appearance: 10 April 2024
- Introduced by: John Holmes
- Felix Dean as VJ (2010)
In-universe information
- Occupation: Student; Juice bar worker
- Father: Vinnie Patterson
- Mother: Leah Patterson-Baker
- Stepfather: Dan Baker; Zac MacGuire
- Brothers: Ryan Baker (step)
- Daughters: Luc Patterson (legal)
- Grandfathers: Ralph Patterson; Theo Poulos
- Grandmothers: Stella Patterson; Helen Poulos
- Uncles: Dimitri Poulos; Chris Poulos; Alex Poulos
- First cousins: Theo Poulos

Vincent Alexandros "VJ" Patterson, Jr. is a fictional character from the Australian soap opera Home and Away. VJ has been portrayed by various child actors since his introduction. Felix Dean played the role from 2007 until it was recast in 2014, and Matthew Little took over. VJ made his first appearance during the episode broadcast on 30 November 2001. He is the son of Leah Patterson (Ada Nicodemou) and Vinnie Patterson (Ryan Kwanten). After departing on 23 November 2017, he made a brief appearance in video footage on 5 February 2018. Little reprised the role in 2024 for Leah's wedding to Justin Morgan (James Stewart).

== Casting ==
The character made his first appearance on 30 November 2001 when he was born to established characters Leah (Ada Nicodemou) and Vinnie Patterson (Ryan Kwanten). From his introduction, VJ has been played by eleven different child actors: Carlo Teodorowych, Jack Monger, Max Theoharis, Marcus Spinetti, Jack Riddle, Harry Roberts, James Roberts, Nicholas Stevens, Cameron Stevens and Cooper Scott. Scott was four years old when he took over the role in early 2006. Twins Nicholas and Cameron Stevens also continued to appear in the role, but a spokesperson told Jackie Brygel of TV Week that the twins were growing up and not always available on set. Felix Dean was cast in the role in 2007. Nicodemou viewed Dean as a "surrogate son" and felt the same way that Leah does for VJ. She has also stated that she became attached to each actor that has played VJ.

In May 2014, Nicodemou confirmed that the character had been recast once again. Dean finished filming earlier in the year, while VJ went off-screen for a while. Of the new actor, Nicodemou explained "We've got a new bloke, Matt, who's started in the role. He is really lovely and eager. I think he's going to be really, really popular as well." The actress added that VJ would be all grown up when he returns, as the producers wanted him to look older. On 31 August 2014, it was confirmed that Matthew Little had taken over the role. Little was cast shortly after he completed a brief stint in rival soap opera Neighbours. He said, "I was facing unemployment and literally got the call, so it was a relief to be offered another job to be honest."

== Development ==
=== Father figures ===
Early storylines for VJ were developed through his mother, Leah's relationships. His father, Vinnie is sent to prison and meets his old friend Jesse McGregor (Ben Unwin). Vinnie convinces Jesse to go to Summer Bay on his release and look out for VJ and Leah. Nicodemou told Jason Herbison from Inside Soap that Leah thinks Jesse is a reformed character because Vinnie would not have sent him to stay otherwise. Leah grows close to Jesse following the death of Vinnie in a fire. VJ begins to choke and Jesse saves his life and subsequently Leah kisses him. The actress told Herbison that Jesse forms a bond with VJ which makes him an ideal partner. Jesse helps Leah through problems with VJ's hearing. Following a break-up, Leah learns that VJ will become permanently deaf unless he has another operation. Jesse acts as Leah's "rock" throughout VJ's health issues and Leah wants to reconcile their relationship.

Leah begins a relationship with Miles Copeland (Josh Quong Tart) They keep it a secret knowing that VJ is still close to her ex-boyfriend Elijah Johnson (Jay Laga'aia). Nicodemou told a writer from Inside Soap that VJ and Miles get along "really well" and he plays a "great father figure" to VJ. Leah does not want to ruin their friendship. VJ discovers the truth but chooses not to tell Leah. When Leah does admit to being with Miles, VJ reveals that already knew and has "major reservations" about their relationship. The actress said that Leah has been a struggling single mother since VJ was born. "As a result, the poor boy's had to grow up so quickly. He's very protective of his mum, so any man coming into their lives is going to have to prove himself worthy - even Miles." Leah later discovers that she is pregnant. But VJ is unhappy with the development and voices his concern. Nicodemou told the writer that Leah and Miles are worried because VJ is unenthusiastic about her pregnancy. She explained that VJ has "seen his mum go through a lot over the years, and isn't sure that they're ready for this just yet." VJ is devastated when Leah and Miles break up and he blames his mother.

=== Kidnap ===
In early 2009, VJ was kidnapped by Brian Lawler (Ric Herbert), who was desperate to get his hands on Leah's inheritance. VJ was playing with Jai Fernandez (Jordan Rodrigues) and Annie Campbell (Charlotte Best) when he went missing. When Leah started looking for him, she was not initially worried, until she got a phone call from someone asking for a ransom of $25,000. Leah was not aware that the kidnapper was Brian, until she went to hand over the money. Nicodemou revealed that VJ was in "a lot of danger" and Leah did not know if he was okay. When she met with Brian, she saw VJ in the car, but Brian had a police radio and when he heard there was a call-out, he drove off with VJ. Leah was hysterical and thought that since Brian had the money, why would he come back with her son? Brian was eventually apprehended by the police and VJ was reunited with his mother.

=== Departure and return ===
On 23 November 2017, Little's final scenes as VJ were broadcast. VJ flees the Bay with Luc Patterson, so that her biological father Mick Jennings (Kristian Schmid) cannot gain custody of her. Little admitted that he was not surprised to learn that VJ was being written out, saying "I knew it had to end at a certain point. The way he left, I was comfortable in that it made sense." Following Little's departure, his co-stars paid tribute to him on social media, with Nicodemou commenting "I miss you so much and work just isn't the same without my little big boy there. I'm so proud of your work and your journey and I can't wait to see what the next adventure looks like."

In March 2024, it was confirmed via a promotional trailer that Little had reprised his role for Leah's wedding to Justin Morgan (James Stewart). Little admitted that returning to the set and being reunited with the cast was "emotional" for him. He stated "It was amazing (reuniting with) long time friends and it was really quite emotional to get to work with people that I haven’t worked with in a long time and I was close to." He also admitted that it was a challenge not to reveal his return on social media. The wedding scenes aired in early April 2024.

== Storylines ==
On the day VJ is born, his father Vinnie is arrested for fraud and later stands trial. Vinnie is found guilty and sentenced to 18 months' imprisonment. VJ's mother Leah struggles to raise him despite assistance from VJ's uncle Alex Poulos (Danny Raco). Further problems arise with the discovery that VJ has a hearing impairment and needs a cochlear operation to repair it. Jesse McGregor, Vinnie's friend, supports VJ and Leah through this difficult time and becomes a father figure to VJ. Leah is left devastated when she learns of Vinnie's apparent death. Jesse and Leah get together but break up and Leah begins dating Dan Baker who proposes and she accepts. On VJ's third birthday, Vinnie, revealed to be alive in witness protection, visits in the guise of a teddy bear and leaves a letter telling Leah and VJ to move with their lives. VJ is left injured when Dan's son Ryan (Issac Gorman) sets fire to Dan and Leah's wedding invitations but makes a recovery. In spite of Ryan's behaviour, Leah and Dan marry and VJ gains a new father figure and stepbrother.

Early into Leah and Dan's marriage, there is disharmony when Dan gets into debt through gambling and VJ's life is threatened by Dan's creditors. The final straw comes when VJ drinks some left-over alcohol while Dan falls asleep while watching him. VJ is rushed to hospital and Leah is furious but he recovers and Leah eventually forgives Dan and they reconcile. When Alex returns the following year, his drug dealing is uncovered when VJ finds Alex's tablets and nearly takes them. Leah banishes Alex as a result. Further family upheaval occurs when Ryan decides to go back to live with his mother Amanda Vale (Holly Brisley) in the city and Dan takes a new job in America and plans for Leah and VJ to join him. However, Dan dies in an abseiling accident and VJ is without a father once again.

VJ is kidnapped by Brian Lawler for a ransom of $25,000 but is freed when the police catch up with Brian. He then begins acting up and then admits that he is being bullied by older boys. Miles tries to help VJ but it backfires when Miles is charged with assaulting VJ's bully, Riley Radcliffe (Tani Edgecombe), and problems escalate. After a newspaper article portrays Miles in a bad light, VJ angrily confronts Riley and throws his bag into the sea. He then overhears Riley's dad, Ian (Ben Simpson), shouting at him for getting his mobile phone wet and tells Miles, Leah and Alf Stewart (Ray Meagher). The charges against Miles are dropped. Elijah, the new reverend at St James' church, helps VJ ease into his first day of High School and VJ quickly warms to him. After initial anger about the knowledge of Vinnie's death being kept from him, VJ asks Elijah to take him and Leah to Vinnie's final resting place in order to achieve closure. Elijah and Leah's relationship breaks up but VJ keeps secretly continues to keep in contact with Elijah when he begins missionary work in Africa.

VJ befriends Lily Smith (Charlie Rose Maclennan), who was born on the same day as he was and they engineer a plan to sneak off to Africa to see Elijah. They hitch-hike but get nervous when the driver wants to take them to his house and they hide in a nearby garage, where detectives Robert Robertson (Socratis Otto) and Graves (Eryn-Jean Norvill) find them. When the River Boys arrive in Summer Bay, VJ joins them for a surf but is knocked of his board by a wave and rescued by Heath Braxton (Dan Ewing). He begins idolising the group, but Leah sees them as a bad influence. When Jett James (Will McDonald) arrives in Summer Bay, he initially bullies VJ and steals his belongings. They soon become friends. Jamie Sharpe (Hugo Johnstone-Burt) becomes obsessed with Leah and VJ. When he threatens them, Leah takes VJ on a long trip to get away from him. A few months later, they return to the Bay and surprise everyone in the Diner. VJ discovers Jett is dating Nina Bailey (Emmy Dougall), whom he fell out with during primary school over a missing Pokémon card. Sally Fletcher (Kate Ritchie) returns and tells Leah that her daughter, Pippa Saunders, who Leah carried as a surrogate, has mitochondrial disease. Leah gets VJ tested and he is given the all-clear. Pippa didn't know about it until VJ and Jett told her about her disease and VJ and Jett felt stupid to tell her. When Zac's nephew Oscar MacGuire (Jake Speer) stays with them, VJ gets along with him well and lets him play some video games. VJ (now played by Matt Little) is angry at Leah for not telling him about her relationship with Zac after watching Matt Page's (Alex Snow) video of Zac and Leah kissing.

When Hunter King (Scott Lee) arrives in Summer Bay, he reveals that he is Zac's biological son and begins bullying VJ. He believes VJ and Leah are trying to prevent Zac from getting to know him. VJ moves into the Summer Bay House with Leah, Zac, Oscar and Evie after their house is burnt down. He befriends Olivia Fraser Richards (Raechelle Banno) after she arrives in town to stay with Irene Roberts (Lynne McGranger). VJ and Olivia take Leah's car for a joyride. VJ develops feelings for Olivia, but she likes Hunter and they agree to just be friends. VJ is one of Zac's bestmen at his wedding to Leah. During Billie Ashford's (Tessa de Josselin) arson trial, Hunter confesses to starting the fire. VJ starts bullying Hunter as a result. They eventually make peace after VJ receives some advice from Billie. VJ and Skye Peters (Marlo Kelly) sneak into a university party at Angelo's and VJ becomes drunk. Billie finds them and helps VJ out. VJ develops a crush on Billie, and he asks Skye to pretend to be his girlfriend to make Billie jealous. Billie tells VJ that she does not feel the same way about him. However, when VJ is comforting Billie, following Oscar's death, they kiss and VJ loses his virginity to her. VJ worries that Billie will tell him it was a mistake, but she assures him it was not.

VJ and Billie start dating and Leah disapproves because of the age difference. Billie's brother Martin Ashford (George Mason) tells VJ that Billie is pregnant with his child. He worries about being a teenage father, but supports Billie. When VJ turns 18, he proposes to Billie. She initially rejects his proposal, but later changes her mind. She asks that they keep their engagement a secret. However, VJ tells everyone at the Diner. During his bucks night with Matt, Ash and Mason Morgan (Orpheus Pledger), VJ climbs up on the roof of the surf buggy and jumps off. When he wakes up the following morning, he is in the hospital with both of his arms in plaster. Ash tells VJ that Billie has decided to cancel the wedding. VJ asks her to change her mind, and she tells Ash and Mason to tell VJ the truth. They admit that VJ's arms are not broken and they have been playing a joke on him. During the wedding, Billie stops the celebrant and runs off. She tells VJ that the baby is not his, and that she was raped shortly before they became a couple. VJ goes away with Leah for a while.

Upon his return, VJ realises Irene's son, Mick Jennings (Kristian Schmid), is Billie's rapist when she suffers a panic attack upon hearing he has been released from the psychiatric facility. Billie goes into labour and VJ drives her to the hospital, but the car breaks down. After failing to find a phone signal, VJ carries Billie to a roadblock, where she is put in a police car and taken to the hospital There, she gives birth to a daughter, who she and VJ name Lucinda Leah "Luc" Patterson. Mick later kidnaps Luc, but Irene returns her to VJ and Billie. After Luc's blessing, Billie collapses after coughing up blood. She is diagnosed with terminal cancer. VJ and Billie decide to marry at the hospital, surrounded by their family and friends. After the wedding, Billie asks VJ to take her and Luc to the beach one last time. VJ and Billie watch the sunrise, and Billie dies in his arms. VJ returns Luc to the hospital. Ash blames VJ for Billie's death, because he took her out of the hospital, and Ash punches him.

VJ decides to get custody of Luc and gets into a huge argument with Ash and Irene, who also want custody of Luc. Ash wins custody of Luc and VJ decides to let her go. VJ struggles to move on from Billie and has a one night stand with Rebecca Brown (Kate Betcher). VJ later befriends Coco Astoni (Anna Cocquerel) and he asks her out on a date. But Leah interrupts them and tells VJ that Coco is only 16. VJ kindly rejects Coco, who takes a liking to him. VJ almost catches Coco making herself sick after she had eaten. VJ later teaches Coco and Jennifer Dutton (Brittany Santariga) to surf. But Coco faints and VJ and Jennifer help her.

VJ finds out from Ash that Mick has returned and is coming back to get custody of Luc. VJ takes Ash's side when he wants Mick gone. VJ later gets into a fight with Mick when he finds out that Mick is Luc's biological father. When Mick refuses to change his mind about getting custody, Ash and VJ's relatives agree that VJ should flee the country with Luc. VJ's family hold a farewell dinner and Leah gives VJ his late father, Vinnie's wedding ring. The next day, Irene distracts Mick as VJ and Luc plan to leave for Cyprus on a plane. VJ says goodbye to Leah and Ash before his and Luc's flight takes off. Seven years later, VJ returns to Australia for Leah's wedding to Justin Morgan. He walks his mother down the aisle and stays for the reception, where he gives Irene a picture from Luc. After saying his goodbyes to Leah and Justin, VJ goes to the city to see Jett, before returning home to Luc.

== Reception ==
For his portrayal of VJ, Dean was nominated for Best Young Actor at the 2008 and 2009 Inside Soap Awards. VJ's name has been a source of amusement to some critics, with one calling him "unfortunately named" and another believing that he was named after an "early model Holden". Linda Barnier and Ben Doherty from the Newcastle Herald wrote that they understood his name to be short for "Video Disc Jockey", while the Sun Herald' Brian Courtis thought he had been "sensitively named". A reporter for the Sunday Mail dubbed the character a "hideous brat".

Gary Gillatt from Inside Soap bemoaned VJ's 2014 recast, saying "Are we really supposed to believe these Summer Bay 'kids' are the same age? VJ now looks about 10 years older than Jett!" Claire Crick from Digital Spy put the recast on her list of eight soap opera recasts that did not "work out", writing that viewers "loved the bond that Felix Dean clearly had with Ada Nicodemou" and that fans were "outraged" by the recast. Crick added that "producers decided they wanted VJ to have a more grown-up look – and they certainly achieved that!" and noted that whilst Little did "slowly win fans over" by the time of his own departure, some fans had never accepted the recast.

In November 2021, three critics for The West Australian placed VJ at number 26 in their feature on the "Top 50 heroes we love and villains we hate" from Home and Away. Of the character, they stated: "Born to Leah and Vinnie, little Vinnie Jr, aka VJ, has been a Summer Bay mainstay for more than two decades. Over the years various kid actors have jumped into his skin, but Matthew Little, who joined as grown-up VJ, really made the part his own. He's out there somewhere still, and we eagerly await his return. Again."
