= Morag Bellingham =

Fictional character in Home & Away

- Home and Away character
- Portrayed by: Cornelia Frances; Eve Kelman (flashback); Vanessa Goddard (flashback); Phoebe Taylor-Bush (flashback)
- Duration: 1988–1989, 1993, 2001–2009, 2011–2013, 2016–2017
- First appearance: 7 June 1988
- Last appearance: 25 April 2017
- Introduced by: Alan Bateman (1988); Andrew Howie (1993); Julie McGauran (2001); Cameron Welsh (2011); Lucy Addario (2016)
- Book appearances: The Bobby Simpson Story; Scandal at Summer Bay; Dani on Trial
In-universe information
- Occupation: Judge; Lawyer
- Father: Gordon Stewart
- Mother: Sarah-Jane Stewart
- Brothers: Alf Stewart
- Sisters: Celia Stewart; Barbara Stewart; Debra Stewart
- Half-sisters: Colleen Smart
- Husband: Richard Bellingham (1969–1989); Ross Buckton (2008–2011)
- Daughters: Bobby Simpson
- Stepdaughters: Charlie Buckton
- Granddaughters: Ruby Buckton
- Grandfathers: Angus Stewart
- Nephews: Alan Fisher; Lance Smart; Owen Dalby; Duncan Stewart
- Nieces: Maureen Evans; Quinn Jackson; Roo Stewart; Rebecca Nash
- Other relatives: Seb Miller; Martha MacKenzie; Ric Dalby; Maggie Smart; Bryce Stewart

Morag Bellingham (also Stewart) QC is a fictional character from the Australian Channel Seven soap opera Home and Away, played by Cornelia Frances. She debuted on-screen in the episode airing on 7 June, 1988. She continued to appear until 1989 and then briefly appeared in 1993. She returned yearly from 2001 until 2009, again from 2011 to 2013 and again from 2016 to 2017. Before she died, Frances had expressed her desire to once again become a permanent cast member. Morag has been described as an antagonistic, independent and cold character and is portrayed as a tough lawyer. She has been involved in storylines such as adopting out her illegitimate daughter Bobby Simpson, being widowed, helping her brother Alf Stewart through his many legal battles and a friendship with troubled teen Aden Jefferies. She has been well received by certain critics for her feisty persona, whilst others have criticised her professional skills.

== Casting ==
Frances played the role of Morag on and off for twenty-nine years. During flashbacks to the character's past, Morag was portrayed by Eve Kelman, Vanessa Goddard and Pheobe Taylor-Bush respectively. Frances joined the cast in a guest capacity, before producers promoted her to the regular cast in June 1988. In June 1989, Suellen Topfer of TV Week reported that Frances would be leaving the show in September, after producers decided to write out Morag in order to focus on storylines centred on the younger characters. Frances stated "The show is in a six o'clock timeslot and they want more young characters because that is what the young audience wants – it doesn't matter what we think." She thought her character had been written "into a corner" and she had become "too big and too strong", so the writers wanted a bit of relief and refocus on the original concept for the serial, which was about the "schoolkids". Frances admitted that she understood the decision, but she was disappointed. She believed Morag could go on for longer and that the writers could some good "mileage" out of her connections with Celia Stewart (Fiona Spence) and Donald Fisher (Norman Coburn). She told Topfer: "Morag had an affair with Donald and I've had only three scenes with him, which is really silly." Ahead of the character's on-screen exit, writers tried to soften her, as, according to Frances, they felt that she was "too strong and too bitchy".

After an eight-year hiatus, in 2001 it was announced that Frances had returned to the serial and Morag would be "more evil" than ever. In 2002 Frances again returned to the serial. In 2008, Frances signed another six-month contract with the serial. She also revealed that fans miss her when she is absent. Discussing this, Frances said "I really adore playing her and I get a lot of people saying 'when are you coming back?" Of her return Frances said "I've played Morag for so long that I have no trouble slipping back into character. I know her so well."

In 2009 executive producer Cameron Welsh revealed that Frances was back filming and she was "very much part of plans going forward" for the future. In 2010, she signed another six-month contract and appeared again from January 2011. Frances admitted she wanted to become a permanent cast member. On 14 April 2011, it was announced that Frances had finished filming her final scenes. A show spokesman said "Morag is a much-loved Summer Bay character and we're sure we'll see her back." Frances returned for another guest stint in early 2012. Frances reprised the role in late 2015 for a brief return in early 2016. In November 2016, a writer for TV Soap reported that Frances had reprised the role once more for a brief stint in 2017. Frances had hoped to return to the role in 2018 as part of the show's 30th anniversary celebrations, however, on 28 May 2018, Frances died from bladder cancer.

== Character development ==
Frances branded Morag "a worthy and antagonistic character." She also describes her as an "independent, amazingly strong woman, but I think she now realises family is what matters most, and she'd probably like to stay in the Bay." Holy Soap said Morag is known for her "barbed comments and cold, cruel demeanour". Morag has softened over time around certain characters but Frances said "she still holds her own, and she's still this very strong independent person." Frances believes that Morag should never find happiness with a lover because "she's put so much doom on everybody". A lot of things have happened to her, that are ultimately her own fault. Frances added: "So it's that nemesis that keeps coming back for the things she has done to other people". Morag's main connection in the serial has been with her brother Alf Stewart (Ray Meagher). There has been much fighting and antagonism between the pair. Morag later softens towards him. Frances said: "She's been through so many mishaps with, underneath she will always care for him and look after him." She holds a great deal of "love and concern" for him which Morag is "reluctant to show a lot of the time". Frances felt it perhaps not the best development because she enjoyed their "wonderful fights".

In an early storyline Morag had a daughter with Donald Fisher (Norman Coburn) and had her adopted. It was later revealed she was existing character Bobby Simpson (Nicolle Dickson). However, when the truth comes out, Morag and Bobby do not want to know each other. Frances liked the fact she gave her baby away and no one knew about it. She also enjoyed playing scenes in which Bobby calls her "mother" and Morag says, "Don't you dare call me that!" Frances also added: "I enjoyed a lot of the original storylines where Morag was fighting against her family." However, Dickson felt the storyline was frustrating because she felt Bobby was turning her back on her foster parents.

In 2001, Morag returns to preside over the trial of Kane Phillips (Sam Atwell) for his sexual assault of Dani Sutherland (Tammin Sursok). Her ruling proved unpopular with many of the residents and caused a further rift between herself and Alf. In 2008 Morag becomes central to storylines with Aden Jefferies (Todd Lasance). Morag wants to know why he has problems because she had "taken a bit of a shine to him". Aden initially doesn't want her help. Whilst interviewed by Digital Spy Frances stated: "There's lots of lovely dialogue that goes on between him and I - I take him under my wing and I find out what's wrong with him." He eventually looks up to her and moves in with her. Frances said: "So I sort of adopt him in a way." She was also about to have a romance storyline. Frances revealed; "there's another storyline which sees an ex-lover of mine come in as a detective". This was Ross Buckton (David Downer), they later resume their relationship and eventually marry.

Morag's 2011 return was planned for six months worth of episodes. Morag returns for husband Ross' funeral and say a "sad farewell". Her other reason is to get the murder charges against Alf dropped. As Morag had no legal work for over one year, the sudden change leaves her confused "about what she actually wants out of life". Frances said of her return "a lot of things happen that she gets involved with". Morag gets involved in Nicole Franklin's (Tessa James) plans to give her child to Marilyn Chambers (Emily Symons). Frances said Morag's "very much in the middle of Nicole, Marilyn and Sid" saying illegal things, Morag becomes involved because "She's very concerned with what is legal and illegal." Morag was initially estranged from niece Roo Stewart (Justine Clarke). Later Roo (now played by Georgie Parker) returns, Morag remembers the young Roo and they "renew hostilities". Frances said "she doesn't think a leopard ever changes its spots. She knows more about Roo than Roo does herself." As the storyline progresses they eventually get along better. Frances said "There isn't the same antagonism between the characters that there was in the past". As Roo is now an adult, Morag "gives in a bit".

== Storylines ==
Morag grew up in Summer Bay and she was close to her brother Alf. It is disclosed before her appearance that Morag is a magistrate. Her niece, Roo contacts her to do a background check on Alf's new fiancée Ailsa Hogan (Judy Nunn) which reveals Ailsa had served time in prison for murdering her abusive father. In June 1988, Morag returns to Summer Bay to attend Roo's wedding to Frank Morgan (Alex Papps) and soon learns that Roo is pregnant and Frank is not the father. She advises her to come clean to Frank about the baby's paternity and Roo does so on the day of the wedding. After Roo becomes a pariah, Morag lets her stay with her in the city but this does not last when Roo learns Morag is conspiring with Brett Macklin (Gerry Sont) to get Roo to sign over custody of their unborn child to him.

Morag reappears for the funeral of her nephew, Alan Fisher (Simon Kay) and later enjoys sparring with Colleen Smart (Lyn Collingwood), a former schoolmate who constantly gets on her nerves. Shortly after she return to the city. It is later revealed that Morag had a secret child with Donald and then put the child up for adoption. Her daughter is then revealed to be Bobby. Bobby is angry to find out Donald is her father, and she is even more angry when she finds out Morag is her mother. Morag is later involved in a plane crash at sea. She survives but is in a coma and Bobby decides to wait until she wakes up to tell her how much she hates her. Following the collapse of her marriage to Richard (John Bonney), Morag moves to Summer Bay permanently. Danny Farnsworth (Justin Connor) takes a job as Morag's assistant under an assumed name but he has an ulterior motive; to gain revenge for her sentencing his father to prison, resulting in his suicide. Danny begins playing mind-games with Morag, and, when she exposes him, he loses control and tries to kill her but Donald and Bobby are able to calm Danny down. After this, Morag returns to the city and puts her house up for sale. When Bobby dies in a boating accident 1993, Morag returns and tries to gain custody of Bobby's adoptive son Sam Marshall (Ryan Clark). When Ailsa finds out about her plans, she manages to stop her.

In 2001, Morag decides to come back to Summer Bay to see her family. She is now a judge and she presides over the trial of Kane for his sexual assault of Dani. She returns in 2002, this time staying longer. During her stay, Morag found herself set against Angie Russell (Laurie Foell). Their many battles nearly resulted in Morag getting sued after accusing Angie of attempted murder. Morag also attended to Alf's health after he insisted Ailsa was back from the dead. While trying to get Alf medical attention, Morag nearly died after he pushed her down the stairs. Fortunately, Alf got the help he needed and a brain tumour was removed in surgery. Morag later decides to move back to Summer Bay permanently and the following year she faces Dani in court once more when she is on trial for running over Kane and sentences her to imprisonment. In 2005 she decides to help the locals over power Project 56. Josh West (Daniel Collopy) becomes the mayor and along with Amanda Vale's (Holly Brisley) help, they try to enforce the project. Along the way, Josh frames Alf for money embezzlement, seeing Alf sent to jail, Morag then declares a battle on Project 56. However, Morag's interference in Josh's plots nearly cost Morag her life. Josh is then killed and Morag finds out her friend Barry Hyde (Ivar Kants) is Josh's murderer so she questions him with Peter Baker (Nicholas Bishop) listening in. After Peter arrests Barry, Morag then feels sorry for him and defends Barry in court, gaining him bail.

Barry's son Kim (Chris Hemsworth) is later wrongfully accused of sexual assault and Morag is first on the scene to defend him. She also defends Robbie Hunter (Jason Smith) over allegations he killed his grandfather. Then she helps Brad Armstrong (Chris Sadrinna) on his drug and assault charges after he is framed by Johnny Cooper (Callan Mulvey). Morag becomes suspicious of Martha's new boyfriend Ash Nader (Ben Geurens) and tries linking him to Johnny's gang. In 2007, Morag learns that Ash was married and attempts to expose the truth. Ash tells Martha himself but manages to convince her to stay with him. After Morag manages to turn everyone against Ash, Martha accuses Morag of giving Bobby up for own selfish reasons and for not being able to understand love. Hurt, Morag then returns to the city to work as a magistrate, wanting to redefine herself in her work. She later returns to help her great-nephew Ric Dalby (Mark Furze) when he is charged with the murder of Rocco Cooper (Ian Meadows). She then exposes Jazz Curtis (Rachel Gordon) after she lies about her mother's death and inheritance.

Morag is horrified to learn that Colleen is actually her half-sister. She starts being mean to Colleen for interfering in Stewart family business. They argue on different occasions, until Morag goes to far. She later makes up with Colleen and lets her have a role in her life. She later befriends Aden, she becomes determined to help him with his issues. Over time the pair bond and she is only one who can make him see any sense. He confides to her about all the abuse of his childhood, she then looks out for him whenever he gets into any trouble. Morag also managed to save Miles Copeland (Josh Quong Tart) from losing his teaching position after a disturbed parent attempted to frame him for child abuse. She then solves Sam Holden's (Jessica Chapnik) murder. She then sees an old friend, police officer Ross Buckton, who is planning on retiring. She starts a relationship with him and they eventually marry. He is then diagnosed with Alzheimer's disease, she leaves with Ross so he can receive the correct treatment in the city. She comes back to support Martha after her husband Jack Holden (Paul O'Brien) is murdered. She then exposes Bridget Simmons's (Joy Smithers) lies before leaving Summer Bay again.

She returns in 2011 for Ross's funeral and to support Alf after he is accused of Penn Graham's (Christian Clark) murder. She tries to expose Will Smith (Zac Drayson) as the killer, but her interference results in Will escaping town and later getting arrested. Alf's name is later cleared. She then meddles with Nicole's plans to give her baby away, she has a go at her and reminds her that she gave her own child up. Morag then finds out about Elijah (Jay Laga'aia) and Grace Johnson's (Clare Chihambakwe) sham marriage, she agrees to keep quiet and helps Grace. Morag realises that Charlie Buckton (Esther Anderson) is dating Darryl Braxton (Steve Peacocke) and manages to stop Charlie from revealing the relationship to her friends and family. Once Alf returns from his trip away, Morag takes a job in the city. She briefly returns to Summer Bay for Charlie's funeral and takes Ruby Buckton (Rebecca Breeds) home with her. Morag becomes concerned that Ruby has not grieved for Charlie properly and encourages her to return to Summer Bay. Sid Walker (Robert Mammone) contacts Morag and brings her back to Summer Bay to help defend his daughter Sasha Bezmel (Demi Harman) when she is accused of the murder of her ex-boyfriend Stu Henderson. Morag defends Sasha in court and she is found not guilty. Morag later helps Ruby, when a bag of marijuana is found in her bag at the airport. Morag returns for Roo's wedding to Harvey Ryan (Marcus Graham). Following the wedding, Morag stays for a few days but Alf gets fed up of her and Colleen's presence and tells them to leave.

Morag returns to defend Zac MacGuire (Charlie Clausen), after he is arrested for the murder of Charlotte King (Erika Heynatz). She immediately clashes with Detective Dylan Carter (Jeremy Lindsay Taylor). Zac is denied bail, but Morag manages to get him some alone time with his wife Leah Patterson-Baker (Ada Nicodemou). She later accuses Dylan of making a deal with the judge, and warns him that she will find out the truth. She also gives Irene Roberts (Lynne McGranger) a phone number of someone who can help with the search for her adopted child. At the diner, Morag threatens Dylan and reveals Dylan's past relationship with his ex-fiancée, Constable Katarina Chapman (Pia Miller). Months later, Roo calls Morag to help John Palmer (Shane Withington) with his arson and manslaughter trial. Morag stays with Roo, and is the first to find out that Roo is dating a younger man, James Mayvers (Tim Ross). At the end of John's trial, he is found guilty and sentenced to fifteen years in prison. Morag begins the appeal process immediately, but warns John and Marilyn that they can only appeal the sentence. After Roo faints, Morag suggests that she is going through menopause. When Roo reveals that she is pregnant, Morag is initially less than supportive but she later tells Roo that she supports her. John's appeal is brought forward and he receives community service. He thanks Morag before she leaves.

== Reception ==
Inside Soap said that "in the ever changing world or Summer Bay, It's comforting to know that one thing remains constant. Every so often, usually when a resident is in legal trouble, we're treated to an extended visit from the formidable Morag Bellingham." During an interview, members of the Wellington Lions were shocked that their interviewer did not know who Morag was. Emily Dunn writing for The Sydney Morning Herald branded Morag a "fearsome judge". The Sunday Mercury branded her as "the frightening Morag". Whilst the Sunday Mail call her a "tough lawyer". Keily Oakes writing for the BBC stated that Frances is "known to many Australians as the feisty Morag." Brian McFlarne in his book The Oxford Companion to Australian Film said Frances's "commanding presence and steely voice" were ideally suited to play a "soap opera super-bitch type" like Morag. In his book, Super Aussie Soaps, Andrew Mercado describes Morag as the "snooty sister" out of the Stewart siblings. He also opined that Bobby's situation was made worse by discovering she had Morag as a mother.

Holy Soap describe Morag's most memorable moment as being "Finally finding true love when she married old flame Ross". The Liverpool Echo chose Morag finding out the truth about Ash as their television pick of the day. Ausculture placed Morag seventh on their list of Australian soap villains. They called Morag "cold-hearted" and said she will be remembered for "being the least liked resident of Summer Bay. After it was revealed that Bobby was in fact her love child with Donald Fisher (shagging Flathead? How could you, Morag!), she lost her husband and her credibility." They added "Morag has sent many loved Summer Bay residents to jail, but rather than one specific moment, it is Morag's reliable day to day bitchery that earns her a place on this list. Plus her name is Morag - names don't get much more evil!"

Bree Hoskin writing for LGBT website Gaydar, included Morag on their list of "Top Ten Soap Bitches". Describing her they stated: "This statuesque woman in all her shoulder-padded, Amazonian-bodied, terracotta-haired glory had a lump of coal where her heart should have been." They also said she has mellowed since finding love. They concluded they too would have felt bitter in her position, quipping "her super-bitch demeanour was all down to the fact that her last love interest had been Donald Fisher." Natalie Reilly of The Sun-Herald compiled a list of the five most "twisted sisters" on television and listed Morag as second. She added: "Until his snivelling, villainous elder sister, Morag, turned up to wreak havoc, the genial patriarch of Summer Bay, Alf Stewart, was doing very well." Reilly also included her in her list of "television divas" and said Frances was perfect to play "Summer Bay's schemer, the judgmental Judge Bellingham". Greg Hassall of The Sydney Morning Herald said Morag's 2011 return was the latest in a trend of bringing back "legacy characters" such as Marilyn and Roo. Carena Crawford from All About Soap named her "ballsy Bellingham" the "super solicitor".
