= Billie Ashford =

- Home and Away character
- Portrayed by: Tessa de Josselin
- Duration: 2015–2017
- First appearance: 27 April 2015
- Last appearance: 15 February 2017
- Introduced by: Lucy Addario
In-universe information
- Occupation: Personal trainer
- Brothers: Luke Ashford; Martin Ashford
- Daughters: Luc Patterson

Belinda "Billie" Ashford is a fictional character from the Australian soap opera Home and Away, played by Tessa de Josselin. The actress was first pictured on set in November 2014, before it was announced the following year that she had joined the cast as the younger sister of established character Martin Ashford (George Mason). De Josselin shot her first scenes in a cemetery on the Central Coast. She made her first appearance during the episode broadcast on 27 April 2015. The actress departed the show at the end of her guest stint, but she was later asked back by the producers and she became part of the regular cast.

Billie is portrayed as a feisty, upfront, "tomboy surfer". Bille's introductory storylines focused on her reunion with her brother Ash and a brief casual relationship with Kyle Braxton (Nic Westaway). Later storylines saw Billie develop an infatuation with Nate Cooper (Kyle Pryor) after he saved her life. She became jealous of his relationship with Kat Chapman (Pia Miller) and tried to ruin her career. As the storyline progressed, Billie accused Nate of assaulting her, leading to his arrest. The storyline was criticised by Rosa Walling-Wefelmeyer of The F-Word, who thought it could potentially reinforce harmful stereotypes about victims of sexual violence.

Billie was then accused of burning down Leah Patterson-Baker's (Ada Nicodemou) house, despite helping to save three of its occupants and sustaining serious burns. Following a brief departure, Billie returned to Summer Bay for her court appearance. Billie's early storylines have led her to be called "unhinged", "troublesome" and "the Bay's bad girl" by critics. Billie was later raped by Mick Jennings (Kristian Schmid) and became pregnant with his child. She also had a relationship with a then seventeen year old VJ Patterson (Matt Little). Shortly after giving birth to her daughter, Luc, Billie was diagnosed with terminal cancer and she died on 15 February 2017.

== Casting ==
On 19 April 2015, it was announced that Tessa de Josselin would be portraying Billie, Martin "Ash" Ashford's (George Mason) younger sister. Of joining the cast, she stated "I was super chuffed. No doubt there was a huge grin on my face for the rest of the week. It's a cool thing when hard work pays off and you know you've been given an opportunity to do what you love." De Josselin shot her first scenes in a cemetery on the Central Coast, alongside Mason, who she met for the first time that morning. De Josselin made her debut as Billie during the episode broadcast on 27 April 2015. Billie was initially a guest role and de Josselin left at the end of her contract to film new episodes of In Your Dreams, before she was invited back as part of the regular cast.

== Development ==
=== Characterisation ===
Billie is the younger sister of Martin Ashford (George Mason), who was introduced in late 2014. Billie is a feisty, "tomboy surfer", who endured a troubled childhood. De Josselin said Billie was fun to play and added "Billie's super upfront and sometimes lacks a social filter." De Josselin told Stephen Downie of TV Week that she shared some similarities with Billie, such as being "very active", but did not think she was as abrasive and as closed off as Billie. De Josselin added, "I think she puts on a front – her kind of tough-girl thing – but I think that's hiding a lot of stuff on the inside." The actress was grateful to the writers for writing in her passion for surfing and joked that she always wanted more surfing scenes in the scripts.

=== Introduction ===
After he was released from prison, Ash began a search to find his sister. Mason commented, "Billie is the only family Ash has left, and he feels they need to make amends now he's out of jail." The siblings were finally reunited on Anzac Day when they both visited their brother Luke's grave. Billie ran away from Ash and tried to leave in her car, but he stood in the way and asked her not to go. She eventually agreed to stay and they returned to Luke's grave, where they talked about their past. Ash then convinced Billie to return to Summer Bay with him, so he could show her around. He introduced her to Ricky Sharpe (Bonnie Sveen), who invited them both to lunch. While they were talking about the events that led to Ash's prison sentence, he admitted to Billie that her boyfriend Dean Sanderson (Kevin Kiernan-Molloy) was dead. Billie was "horrified" and initially believed Ash was responsible, until he explained that his friend Darryl Braxton (Steve Peacocke) had been charged with Dean's murder.

When Ash offered to let Billie stay in his caravan, she turned him down and decided to stay at the Braxton house instead. De Josselin commented that Billie was "excited" about meeting new people and finally having a roof over her head, as she had been living out of her car for the past few months. Unaware that Billie was in the other room, Kyle Braxton (Nic Westaway) came home and started playing his guitar, waking her up. Billie introduced herself to Kyle and explained that Ricky had allowed her to stay at the house. Kyle apologised for waking her and Billie began flirting with him, before leaning over to kiss him. De Josselin told Stephen Downie of TV Week, "I think Billie can sense Kyle's a sensitive, caring guy. She can also sense he's going through something." Despite going through a recent break-up, Kyle responded to the kiss and he and Billie had a one-night stand. Kyle felt guilty the following morning and made it clear to Billie that their night together was a mistake. When Kyle's ex-girlfriend, Phoebe Nicholson (Isabella Giovinazzo) came over to reconcile with him, she overheard Kyle asking Billie to keep their one-night stand a secret.

=== Assault allegation ===
Billie's first major storyline occurred in June 2015 when she developed a crush on Nate Cooper (Kyle Pryor) and later accused him of assault. The storyline began when Nate and his girlfriend Kat Chapman (Pia Miller) spotted Billie floating face down in the sea. Nate ran into the surf to get Billie and carried her to the beach, where he administered mouth-to-mouth resuscitation to get her breathing again. As Billie came round, Nate assured her she would be okay. As Billie looked at Nate "adoringly", Stephen Downie of TV Week noted that she was developing a crush on the doctor. Billie's crush on Nate intensified and she began trying to break up his relationship with Kat. Nate rejected Billie's advances and made it clear to her that he was not interested in her romantically, which she seemed to accept. Billie later approached Nate when she found herself alone with him in the gym and thanked him for being a gentleman, unnerving Nate. Billie's demeanour suddenly changed and she ran her nails down his cheek, scratching his face, and tore at her clothes, while screaming for him to stop. Her screams attracted the attention of Chris Harrington (Johnny Ruffo), who rushed into the gym and comforted Billie, as she accused Nate of assaulting her. Nate was questioned by Sergeant Mike Emerson (Cameron Stewart) at the police station, where he protested his innocence. However, Emerson then produced proof of a sexually explicit text sent from Nate's phone to Billie the previous week.

Nate was arrested for the attempted sexual assault of Billie. Kat immediately began trying to prove that Nate was innocent, but had difficulty as Billie "put on a confident performance" for the police, while Chris also backed up her story. However, Nate and Kat came to Chris to plead Nate's innocence and then asked him to help catch Billie out. Chris agreed to help them after finding evidence that Billie was behind an embarrassing poster that threatened to ruin Kat's career. Chris invited Billie over to his house and then tried to get her to confess to setting Nate up. He told her that he knew she was lying, but he wanted to see Nate punished and suggested they work together. Billie soon spotted that Chris's phone was recording the conversation and she switched it off, while claiming that she had not fallen for his plan. However, when she also admitted to framing Nate, Chris revealed that he was actually wearing a police wire and Billie was arrested by Emerson. De Josselin found the storyline challenging to portray, saying "it's not something I would ever do. So, there's a challenge with breaking it down and thinking from the perspective of your character."

=== Arson accusation and depression ===
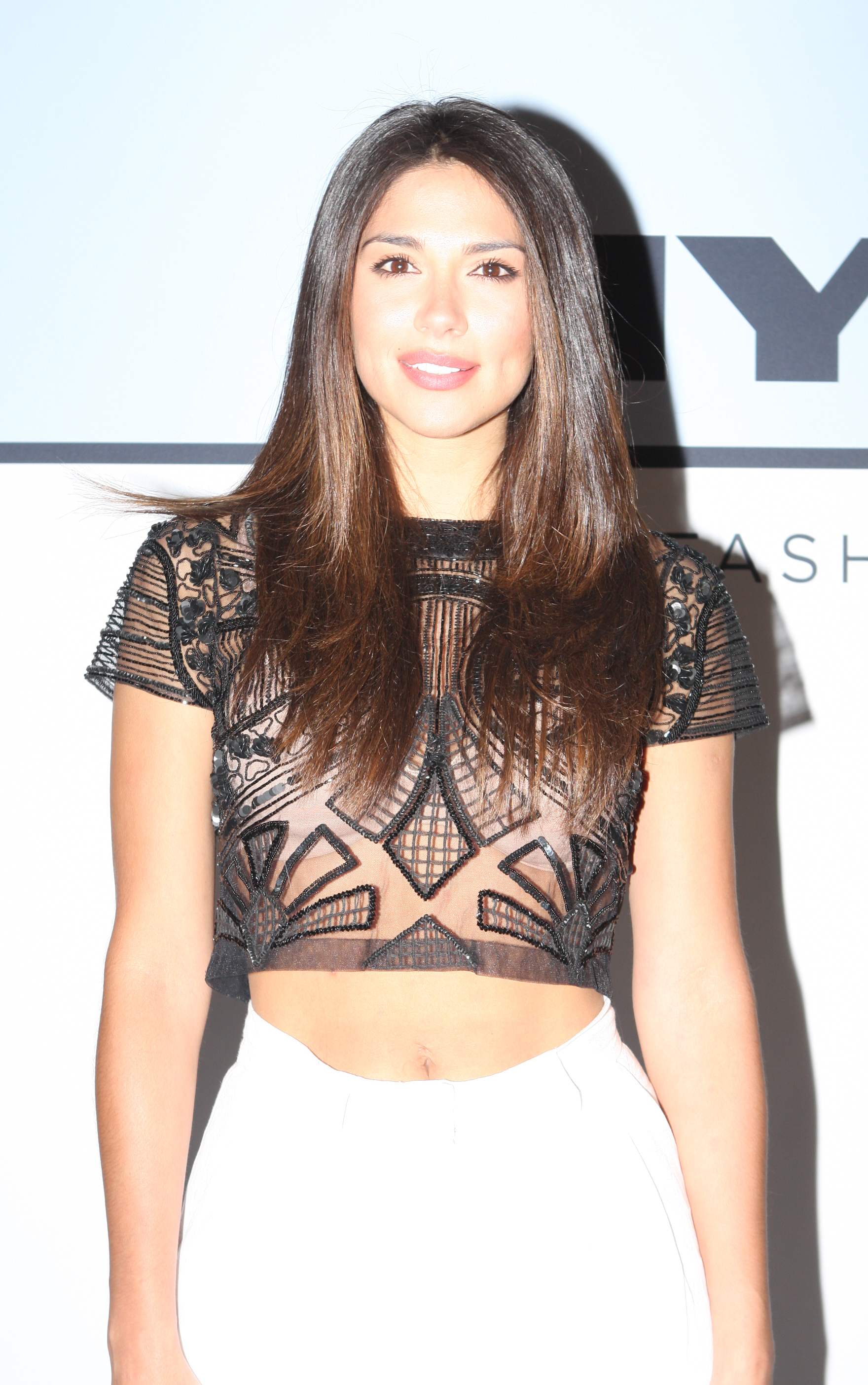
Billie helped save Kat Chapman, played by Pia Miller (pictured), from falling off a cliff edge, shortly after Kat had arrested her for arson.

When Billie noticed Leah Patterson-Baker's (Ada Nicodemou) house was on fire, she ran into the building to help Zac MacGuire (Charlie Clausen) rescue Oscar MacGuire (Jake Speer) and Matt Page (Alec Snow). She helped Zac kick down a bedroom door, allowing Oscar and Matt to escape. As the men rushed to get out of the house, they inadvertently left Billie behind. She became trapped by falling ceiling debris and was seriously injured. While Billie was recovering at the hospital, Kat arrested her for arson. Ash refused to believe that she was innocent, following her false assault allegation against Nate, and walked away from her. When Billie began to feel that no one cared about her, she "fell into a dark depression", leaving Nate concerned about her state of mind. Nate urged Ash to visit her in the hospital. Ash realised that Billie would not be able to cope with losing another sibling, so he tried to "clear the air" between them.

However, when Ash voiced his doubts about Billie's innocence, she grew angry and disowned him. Billie then decided to get revenge by writing a letter to Ricky telling her that Brax had faked his death and that Ash had lied to her about it. When Billie discharged herself from the hospital, Nate told Kat that he was worried about her mental and physical health, as her burns needed constant treatment. Kat was also aware that Billie was close to breaching her bail conditions and she and Ash began a search. After failing to find her, they called off the search for the night, leaving Ash feeling guilty. The following day, Kat found Billie on top of the headland. De Josselin told an Inside Soap journalist that Billie felt that she had lost her brother and that the whole town was against her, so she had no reason to stay in Summer Bay.

Kat was worried that Billie might jump due to her unstable behaviour, so she tried to talk her into stepping away from the edge. However, it appeared Billie had not heard her as she continued to stare at the sea. When a message came through on Kat's police radio, it startled Billie and in her panic at seeing Kat, she moved closer to the edge of the cliff. De Josselin commented, "When Billie hears Kat's radio, she snaps straight back to reality. She immediately thinks that Kat is there to arrest her for setting fire to Leah's house." Kat was worried that Billie might fall and reached out to grab her in an attempt to save her. Billie stepped to the side at the last minute, causing Kat to go over the edge. She managed to grab hold of a ledge and called for Billie to help her. Billie managed to save Kat by pulling her back over. At the hospital, Billie reiterated that she did not start the fire, before she was transferred to a hospital in the city.

=== Return and trial ===
Months later Billie found an unconscious Oscar MacGuire (Jake Speer) washed up on a beach. She dragged him to a nearby shack, shook him awake and gave him fresh water. As he came round, Oscar was surprised to see Billie was his rescuer and immediately accused her of trying to burn Leah's house down with him inside. Bille maintained her innocence and explained to Oscar that she had been living rough since leaving town a few months prior. She then called the police to tell them where Oscar was. He wondered if she would return to the Bay with him to see Ash, but she quickly left. Despite Billie not wanting to be found, Oscar told them that she had rescued him. Billie was eventually persuaded to return to Summer Bay ahead of her trial for arson. Ash now believed his sister was innocent and was against her lawyer's suggestion that she should plead guilty to gain a lesser sentence. He was also worried about her future, and when Phoebe told Billie his fears, she decided that the only option she had was to skip town. Phoebe managed to talk her round, but the following morning, they realised Billie had tried to flee and stopped her.

Speaking to Ali Cromarty of TV Week, de Josselin explained that Billie knew she had been set up, but she was "at a loss" because she did not know who really started the fire. As she entered the courtroom, Billie was nervous and apprehensive. She knew she was innocent, but she was not sure the judge would feel the same way. She also thought her reputation and past could be used against her. De Josselin said, "she feels there are so many things that have happened in the past, so why would anyone believe her? She's feeling disheartened." The actress added that Billie was "resigned" to going to prison, especially after Leah gave her testimony. Billie's fate rested on whether the real arsonist, Hunter King (Scott Lee), would stand up and confess. Already struggling with his guilt, Hunter was put under more pressure when Andy Barrett (Tai Hara) admitted he knew Hunter had started the fire. Cromarty pointed out that if Billie was found innocent, it could be the chance she needed to change her ways. De Josselin agreed, stating "all Billie wants is to feel a part of the Summer Bay family. She's upset she's been falsely accused. It could be a turning point – if she can get over it." Hunter eventually admitted to starting the fire, clearing Billie's name.

=== Relationship with VJ Patterson ===
"For Billie, there's this beautiful person willing to be there for her when she's needing love."

— De Josselin on Billie and VJ's relationship (May 2016).

A few months later, Billie was given a love interest in the form of seventeen year old VJ Patterson (Matt Little). The story arc began with VJ developing a crush on Billie, who was initially amused by his flirty behaviour. When she noticed VJ trying unsuccessfully to teach Skye Peters (Marlo Kelly) how to surf, she offered her help. When Skye told VJ how good Billie was at teaching her, VJ's quick agreement caused Skye to realise he had feelings for Billie, despite his denial. VJ later asks Skye to pose as his girlfriend to make Billie jealous, as he believes Billie will want him if she thinks he is unavailable. He also wanted to prove to Billie that he was "definite boyfriend material". Skye thought the plan was "silly", but VJ pointed out that it could help her catch Oscar's attention too. Although Billie was initially uninterested in VJ, she began to develop feelings for him and his friendship helped provide a distraction from everything that had happened to her.

In an interview with Kerry Harvey of Stuff.co.nz, de Josselin admitted to being surprised by the development. She thought the age gap between Billie and VJ, who were twenty-three and seventeen respectively, was "a big difference in real life", but she was okay with it and thought that the relationship had a good chance. She stated, "I don't think age is too much of a deciding factor. If two people are compatible and they've got a good strong bond then they've got a good chance of making it work." When VJ's mother, Leah Patterson-Baker (Ada Nicodemou) spotted Billie and VJ together, she was "livid" to learn they were in an intimate relationship. She was concerned about the age gap, as VJ was still at school. Leah was also aware of Billie's past and her bad reputation. De Josselin thought Leah had not had a chance to get to know Billie, especially as she had changed. She also was not aware of how genuine the couple's feelings for each other were. The actress also said that Billie's new relationship was helping to heal her and she could tell VJ really loved her. Leah and VJ's stepfather Zac chose to support the couple.

Months later, on his 18th birthday, VJ proposes to Billie. VJ creates a romantic setting in the garden by stringing up fairy lights to spell out "Will you marry me?", but it is "the last thing Billie is expecting" and she turns down the proposal. VJ was "gutted" by the rejection and demanded to know why Billie did not want to marry him. Unable to tell him the truth about the paternity of her unborn child, Billie explains that she thinks VJ only proposed because she is pregnant. VJ then gave Billie an ultimatum, saying that if she does not want to get married, then he thinks they should end their relationship. Billie eventually gives into pressure and accepts his proposal.

A couple of months later, Billie finally tells VJ the truth about how she conceived her baby. As VJ says his vows during their wedding, Billie realises that she is unable to go through with marrying him and runs away. When VJ demands to know why she has changed her mind, Billie reveals that the baby is not his and that she was raped. A spokesperson told Sarah Ellis of Inside Soap, "The sad thing is, if she had been honest with him from the start, he probably would have stood by her. Instead, she's lied to him for months and humiliated him in front of his loved ones." VJ admits that he still loves Billie, but he cannot promise that they have a future together.

=== Rape and subsequent pregnancy ===
At the same time Billie was beginning a relationship with VJ, she was struggling to cope after being raped by a masked man in the gym. She initially kept her assault a secret, until she confided in Oscar, who later died in an explosion, and Phoebe, who agreed to keep quiet. De Josselin commented, "She's really traumatised by the incident and is looking for some reassurance that everything is going to be OK." The actress wished that Billie had listened to Phoebe, who advised her to go to the police, as she thought Billie would have been able to take control of the situation. However, due to her past, Billie was reluctant to report her attack. De Josselin said that it was "very hard" for Billie, and that things would get more difficult as the story arc continued. de Josselin explained to Harvey (Stuff.co.nz) that everything had just started to go well for Billie, so the attack had blindsided her and left her in shock. She continued, "I think initially it's not even really registering in her brain that it happened and that it was real. I think after that she just starts to freak out that no one will believe her because of her past behaviour."

As the storyline developed, the character soon learned that she was pregnant as a result of her assault. De Josselin admitted that the rape and pregnancy was "a confronting storyline" for her. She did a lot of research before filming to gain an understanding of how women feel after being assaulted. When Billie was admitted to hospital with severe morning sickness, Ash came to see her and found out she was pregnant. As Billie could not face telling him about her assault, she let him assume VJ was the father of her baby. Ash then confronted VJ, who was shocked to learn he was going to be a father. Billie undertakes "bizarre behaviour" to hide her ordeal by doctoring her medical records to alter her date of conception. Billie later discovered that Irene Roberts' (Lynne McGranger) son, Mick Jennings (Kristian Schmid) is her rapist and the father of her child.

=== Departure ===
Details about Billie's exit storyline were released on 7 February 2017. In the lead up to her daughter's blessing, Billie suffers with "a persistent cough". At the ceremony, Billie collapses and is rushed to the hospital, where Nate has to run a bronchoscopy to learn what is wrong with her. Billie's condition "rapidly" deteriorates and Little commented that VJ has to face the fact that Billie might die.

The character's exit occurred during the episode broadcast on 15 February. After being diagnosed with an aggressive, terminal cancer, Billie is informed that she only has a short time left. She and VJ decide to marry at the hospital, before Billie requests that VJ take her and her daughter Luc Patterson to the beach. While watching the sun rise, Billie dies in VJ's arms. After her character's exit aired, de Josselin revealed that she was "bummed out" when the producers told her that Billie would die, as she wanted her to carry on and do good things. She also felt sadness at seeing a character she had "built, lived and breathed for so long" go. The actress added that she found Billie's final storyline interesting and was glad that she finally achieved peace.

== Reception ==
While recapping Billie's first episode, a writer for the TV Week website commented "at first, Billie wanted nothing to do with Ash – what a great relationship these two have." During the Nate storyline, a contributor to the Sunday Mail noted "Billie has taken to following Nate around a lovelorn puppy". A colleague stated, "Ash's sister Billie has caused the usual tornado that extended family members tend to do in the Bay when they arrive. She has been following Nate around like an obsessed teenager, much to cop Kat's annoyance." TV Week's Stephen Downie thought Billie was "slightly unhinged". Rosa Walling-Wefelmeyer, writing for the feminist blog The F-Word, expressed her disappointment about the false assault allegation storyline, saying it was not "that original – or entertaining". Walling-Wefelmeyer thought the writers' had introduced the trope with the intention of having it "challenged and subverted", instead she believed the plot could "reinforce harmful stereotypes" about victims of sexual violence.

A Birmingham Mail reporter later observed, "Billie's life in Summer Bay hasn't been a happy one so far – although she mostly only has herself to blame for that. Lying about being attacked, she has become a social pariah – but finds a way to redeem herself this week when she rescues Zac, Oscar and Matt from a fire at Leah's house." Another Sunday Mail contributor had a similar view, stating "It's never easy being the town pariah but that's the position Billie finds herself in after her recent unfounded accusations." After the fire, a Liverpool Echo journalist commented "Billie isn't the most popular person around". However, Helen Vnuk of TV Week included Billie in her feature on soap heroes, saying that "it was troubled Billie who saved everyone." Digital Spy's Sophie Dainty dubbed her "troublesome", while Laura Morgan of All About Soap thought she was "unhinged" and "venomous". Stephen Downie of TV Week called her "the Bay's bad girl" and quipped "when Billie arrived in the Bay last year, she brought a whirlwind of trouble."

Following Billie's rape, Sarah Ellis of Inside Soap stated "There's no doubt that Billie's ordeal has been a harrowing plot to watch."
