= Miles Copeland (Home and Away) =

Fictional character in Home and Away

- Home and Away character
- Portrayed by: Josh Quong Tart; Jackson Edwards (Flashback); Ryley Mickle (Flashback)
- Duration: 2007–2011
- First appearance: 30 November 2007
- Last appearance: 23 November 2011
- Introduced by: Julie McGauran
In-universe information
- Occupation: English teacher Caravan park owner Foster parent
- Father: Aaron Copeland
- Mother: Diana Wilson
- Stepfather: Derek Wilson
- Sisters: Sally Fletcher
- Wife: Louise Copeland (2000–04)
- Daughters: Amber Copeland
- Grandmothers: Mrs. Keating
- Uncles: Ross Keating
- Nieces: Pippa Saunders

Miles "Milco" Copeland is a fictional character from the Australian Channel Seven soap opera Home and Away, played by Josh Quong Tart. He debuted on-screen during the episode airing on 30 November 2007. Ryley Mickle and Jackson Edwards played Miles in flashback sequences, showing him at ages three and eight years old respectively. During the early years of Home and Away, Sally Fletcher (Kate Ritchie) often spoke of an imaginary friend she called "Milco". When Ritchie announced her departure from the soap, producers decided to introduce the real Milco, as regular character Miles Copeland. The development was described by the media as a "legacy storyline." Quong Tart announced his departure from Home and Away in October 2011. Miles departed on 23 November 2011.

Miles is characterised as being charming and quick witted. His clothes often consist of board shorts and crumpled shirts, with his long hair, this gives him a trademark "beachy" look. Miles' style changed in 2010 following Quong Tart's break from the show. Upon returning to Home and Away, the actor had lost weight, grown a beard and cut his hair short. Producers were impressed with the changes and wrote them into the scripts. Miles is often seen consuming large amounts of food, which stems from his time spent living hungry on the streets. This was a character trait created by Quong Tart. Some viewers have written to Home and Away to complain about Miles' eating habits.

Miles' storylines have often centred on his friendships and romantic relationships with other characters. He has become a surrogate father to several teenagers, including Jai Fernandez (Jordan Rodrigues) and Melody Jones (Celeste Dodwell). Miles and Kirsty Sutherland (Christie Hayes) had a long relationship together, during which they lost an unborn child. Kirsty eventually left town, ending their relationship. After sharing a long friendship, Miles and Leah Patterson-Baker (Ada Nicodemou) entered into a romantic relationship in 2011. Leah becomes pregnant and Miles proposes to her. Miles has earned a generally positive reception, while Quong Tart has been nominated for three Inside Soap Awards.

== Creation and casting ==
The character of Miles was introduced to Home and Away in 2007, as Sally Fletcher's (Kate Ritchie) brother, whom she had always referred to as "Milco". For twenty years, viewers had been led to assume Milco was just Sally's imaginary friend. Channel Seven ran an on-air promotion campaign, which promised viewers "a 20-year-old mystery" would be solved. In the 2007 season finale, Miles mysteriously arrives in Summer Bay and writes "Milco" in the sand on the beach. Quong Tart was cast in the role of Miles. He previously starred in the Home and Away spin-off headLand as Will Monk. In 2010, Miles was briefly written out of the serial, while Quong Tart took a break from filming to rehearse for a play at the Sydney Opera House.

In October 2011, Quong Tart announced his departure from Home and Away. Of his time in the show, Quong Tart told TV Week, "I couldn't have imagined how much fun I would have and the friends I would make on Home and Away. Playing Miles was a gift." Rebecca Davies from Digital Spy reported the actor had already filmed his final scenes, while TV Week said the way in which Miles leaves the Bay was being kept secret. Miles departed on 23 November 2011.

== Character development ==
=== Characterisation and career ===
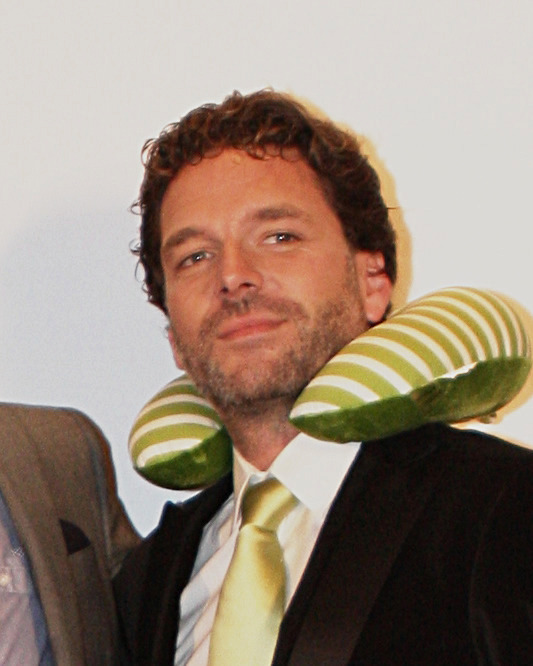
Josh Quong Tart (pictured) plays unlucky-in-love Miles.

Once he returned to set up home in the Bay, the adult Miles soon developed his trademark style. The crumpled shirts and board shorts might not have been to everyone's taste, but his charm and quick wit more than made up for his sartorial shortcomings, earning him a string of admirers, from on-off squeeze Kirsty to bessie mate Leah, with whom he's recently struck up a relationship.

— Channel 5 on Miles.

Quong Tart told Channel 5 that he liked the way Miles looks at the world and revealed that he shared similarities with the character's personality. Miles is often shown consuming large amounts of food on-screen. Miles enjoys his food because of his time spent living hungry on the streets. This was a character choice made by Quong Tart. He thought it was important that viewers see his eating habits, staying true to "representing human beings." However, Quong Tart stated that it sometimes reached a "point where it might not be very pleasant to watch." Viewers had written letters to Quong Tart requesting that Miles should stop "pigging out on television."

In 2011, Miles returns to Home and Away with a new look. Miles had lost weight, cut his hair short and grew a beard. Off-screen Quong Tart had such a busy schedule that he lost weight. When he revealed his new look to producers, they were so impressed they decided to change Miles' image, because it suited the storyline.

Miles secures employment as a teacher at Summer Bay High. One of his students, Ruby Buckton (Rebecca Breeds), develops romantic feelings for him. Breeds said it was a "genuine teenage infatuation" and Ruby was drawn to Miles' maturity rather than his physical appearance. Quong Tart said Miles was "taken back" when he was faced with accusations of kissing Ruby. He manages to prove they are false.

=== Relationship with Kirsty Sutherland ===
"They weren't trying to impress each other – they just became friends straightaway. There's a bit of an age gap, but they have a lot of fun together. They're running the Summer Bay house together, so it's like they already have a partnership."

— Christie Hayes on Miles and Kirsty's relationship (2008)

One of Miles' first relationships is with Kirsty Sutherland (Christie Hayes), which develops from a friendship. Miles is left upset over his foster child Jai Fernandez (Jordan Rodrigues). His emotional state has an effect on Kirsty and she kisses him. Hayes told TV Week that as Kirsty's feelings "take over in the moment", Miles is left surprised because he had been harbouring feelings for her too. Hayes also said Miles did not want to scare Kirsty away and they agree to take their relationship slowly. Hayes later said that Miles and Kirsty's relationship worked so well because "they talk about things and they're mature about their relationship." Kirsty decides that she needs to raise money for her husband Kane Phillips' (Sam Atwell) trial. She secretly begins work as an escort behind Miles' back. Hayes' explained Kirsty was "terrified" that Miles would find out and hated lying to him, but "has no choice." When Miles discovers the truth about Kirsty's escorting, he feels "totally betrayed" and ends their relationship. However, when Kirsty nearly sleeps with a client, Miles comes to her aid. At this point Leah Patterson-Baker (Ada Nicodemou) tries to kiss Miles, as the two previously shared a connection. However, Miles defends Kirsty when he learns Leah had argued with Kirsty over her deceit. The state of their relationship remained troubled, though Hayes correctly predicted the couple would reunite.

In 2009 Hayes quit the serial and her exit storyline played out the same year. It was initially left unclear what impact her departure would have on Miles'. Their relationship deteriorates after Kirsty miscarries their unborn baby. Kirsty is left distraught and feels she has to move with her life without Miles. However, Kirsty does not tell Miles she is leaving and leaves him a goodbye letter. Speaking of the scenes, Hayes said "I don't agree with what she did or how she did it but Kirsty in her warped, grieving mind thinks it's best for everybody." She felt that Kirsty's actions were "horrible and selfish." She also described her as "emotionally detached" and Miles would have tried to talk her out of leaving if he had been made aware of her departure. Viewers were not shown the full content of the goodbye letter. Hayes said it was good because she wrote a private goodbye letter to Quong Tart, and noted the personal element was best left between the two. After Miles chances of a family are again ruined, Miles loses control. He starts drinking and on one occasion he tries to kiss Leah. Producers decided to introduce a character named Rabbit (Mitzi Ruhlmann), who "brings a little fun back into Miles' life." Though Rabbit later turns out to be his dead daughter and a figment of Miles' imagination.

=== Relationship with Leah Patterson-Baker ===
In 2008, Miles and Leah develop feelings for one another. Nicodemou who plays Leah said her character becomes "freaked out" when she realises they share a connection. At this point in the series Leah was still grieving for her late husband Dan Baker (Tim Campbell). Leah is so ashamed of herself she "cuts Miles off". Nicodemou added that the characters "bonded straight away" because Miles understands Leah and has supported her when she needed help. However, Miles "cannot deny the attraction" which sends Leah further into denial. She decides she is not ready to move on, Nicodemou said this was to respect Dan's memory. Though, she concluded that Leah sees Miles as an "old sock you just feel comfortable with."

In January 2011, Quong Tart revealed Miles was set to have a new love interest. The actor said he found his character's new romance intriguing and explained Miles is "more surprised than anyone that it happens." A few months later, the Daily Star reported Miles would confess his love to Leah, who is shocked by the declaration. Miles is left wondering whether he has ruined their friendship by revealing his feelings to her. An insider told the paper, "Miles and Leah have both been unlucky in love so if they could find happiness together it would be pretty special. Leah is shocked but once the confession starts to sink in she wonders whether they could work as a couple. She begins to consider making a go of it with him." Nicodemou explained that Leah and Miles have tried to get together in the past, but the timing has never been right for them. She later told RTÉ TEN that she thinks Miles and Leah are well suited and hoped they find happiness with each other. Miles and Leah discuss their situation and Leah decides to take the first step and kisses Miles to see if they have any chemistry. Nicodemou said once Leah realises she and Miles have chemistry, she decides to go for it and they begin dating.

In August 2011, Leah discovers she is pregnant. She realises that she does not want a baby as she previously had a miscarriage, which made her decide not to have children again. Of the impact the storyline would have on Miles and Leah, Nicodemou said "It's a really interesting storyline for them. It makes everything serious because things have been quite light, so it's good to see that side of them. There are some rocky times ahead for them because there are differences of opinion." A week later it was announced Miles would propose to Leah in a bid to "solidify" their relationship. Miles confides in Alf Stewart (Ray Meagher) about his plans and Quong Tart said Alf is very excited and encourages Miles. Of Miles' decision to propose to Leah, Quong Tart said "They've dated for a while and they know each other so well, and I think it's just one of those things that makes sense."

=== Other relationships ===
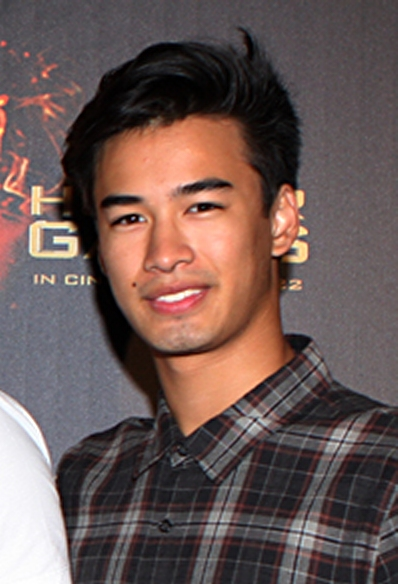
Jordan Rodrigues (pictured) plays Jai Fernandez; who is taken into Miles' care.

Miles starts a relationship with Shandi Palmer (Samantha Tolj), TV Week described them as a "kooky" pairing. However their relationship was short-lived, lasting only a number of weeks. Quong Tart said "It came and went like every romance in his life." Miles "couldn't believe his luck" with Shandi because of her attractive appearance. They were compatible because she was "beachy and hippy" and like Miles enjoyed to talk about the meaning of life. Miles drunkenly sleeps with Roo Stewart (Georgie Parker), the next morning she reacts badly. A Home and Away spokesperson said Miles was one of the "nicest blokes in the Bay" and felt like a humiliated "idiot".

In various storylines Miles has taken in teenagers without homes. Jai Fernandez (Jordan Rodrigues) is the first to be taken into Miles' care. Miles knew Jai from the Boxing Day tsunami in which they both lost their families. Rodrigues said that Jai is "angry at the world" because Miles "ditched" him in Phuket. Miles tries to help Jai because he realises that he is having a tough time at the refuge. Off-screen Quong Tart mentored Rodrigues to improve his acting skill. He later takes in Melody Jones (Celeste Dodwell), though she makes life hard for Miles by causing chaos at the school formal and running away to Melbourne. In the latter storyline Miles and Charlie Buckton (Esther Anderson) travel to Melbourne to search for Melody. The episodes marked the first time the cast had filmed in Melbourne. Location shoots took place at Queen Victoria Market, Docklands Studios Melbourne and St Kilda. Anderson told Inside Soap that "It's a nice self-contained little storyline" and described it as a treat for British and Irish viewers. She added that Melody ends up on the streets and Charlie and Miles fail to locate her straightaway. The situation leaves them feeling "vulnerable" and they kiss. Anderson opined the kiss was "a rebound thing" and they feel "awkward the following morning."

Miles lets teenagers Nicole Franklin (Tessa James) and Romeo Smith (Luke Mitchell), and adult character Marilyn Chambers (Emily Symons) move in with him. Together they form a new character unit, Meagher who plays Alf praised the dynamic. He said as none of them have external relationships at the time, there was a "genuine caring for the well-being of the other people in the house."

== Storylines ==
=== Backstory ===
Miles and his twin Sally initially lived together with their alcoholic father Aaron (Timothy Walter) and mother Diana. Aaron used to beat Diana, so she left him and took Sally with her. When Miles was eight years old, Aaron read that Diana and her new husband Derek Wilson had been killed in a boating accident. Aaron and Miles went to find Sally, but after seeing Sally was better off with the Fletcher family, they left. In the serial Sally constantly insisted her imaginary friend Milco was real, it was actually Miles she was thinking about, but no one believed Sally and her bullying foster brother Brian "Dodge" Forbes (Kelly Dingwall) eventually stopped her believing in him. Aaron died of alcohol-related illness, so Miles became an English teacher. He married a woman called Louise and they had a daughter called Amber. They both died in the Boxing Day tsunami whilst on holiday in Phuket. He then went on a downward spiral and became a homeless drifter.

=== 2007–11 ===
Miles turns up in Summer Bay and decides to stick around after he thinks it is a familiar setting. He has nowhere to live and is starving. Irene Roberts (Lynne McGranger) becomes annoyed with him for stealing food out of the bins, but Roman Harris (Conrad Coleby) takes pity on him and feeds him. He sees Sally on the beach and writes Milco in the sand. They later become friends and she feels like she has a close connection. He reveals his family's death to be the reason why he became a drifter. He eventually reveals the truth to Sally, that he is Milco and her twin brother. After it sinks in she is delighted with this and they become close. Miles stays with her and one night forgets to lock the door. Johnny Cooper (Callan Mulvey) enters the house and stabs Sally, however she survives but he blames himself. He decides to get his life back on track and becomes an English teacher at the school. Aden Jefferies (Todd Lasance) initially gives him a hard time, but he is well liked after he and Ric Dalby (Mark Furze) arrange a leaving party for Sally, who has decided to move away. At the party Steven Matheson (Adam Willits) and Carly Morris (Sharyn Hodgson) are startled to meet the person they heard so much about whilst growing up.

Miles becomes the new owner of the caravan park. He becomes good friends with Leah and falls in love with her. She feels it is to soon after husband Dan's death and does not feel the same, leaving him upset. Morag Bellingham (Cornelia Frances) then helps him track down Jai, a boy from Phuket whom he told he would help, but never did. He comes to live with Miles, their relationship is strained by Jai's reluctance to trust him, eventually they become close. Religious Christine Jones (Elizabeth Alexander) later starts a campaign to have Miles removed from his job when she does not agree with his choice of book used for teaching. Morag later helps rid of Christine and saves his career. He lets Melody Jones stay with him, but she rebels and causes trouble for him with her new-found bad attitude. He then has a brief relationship with Jazz Curtis (Rachel Gordon).

He gives Kirsty a place to stay. They start a relationship and he falls in love with her, however he finds out she has been working as an escort to raise money for husband Kane Phillips' (Sam Atwell) trial and throws her out. Melody becomes more wild and runaway from home, he tracks her down with the help of Charlie, who he shares a kiss with. He lets Melody leave to live in New Zealand with her mother. Kirsty returns with Kane who attacks him and he has to admit they were never together. After Trey Palmer (Luke Bracey) makes advances on Kirsty and Miles supports her, they reconcile. Trey tries to attack Kirsty, but Miles pushes him over, Miles is then under investigation for assault, later Trey drops the charges. Whilst out fishing Miles falls overboard and is nearly eaten by a shark, he discovers Lou De Bono's (David Roberts) body in the process. He promises to look after Nicole after Roman is sent to prison. Miles then decides he wants to try for a baby with Kirsty, she agrees but he is angry when he sees her taking the pill. She says he thought he would leave her, he reassures her this is not the case. Kirsty starts university studying teaching. He resents her for spending time at university with her new friends, he suspects she is having affair. Upon confrontation she admits she is actually pregnant. She is unhappy about it, but agrees to keep the baby. He breaks his promise of keeping the pregnancy a secret, Kirsty starts to feel more at ease about the baby. Kirsty has a series of fits causing her to miscarry. Their relationship becomes strained and Kirsty's mother Shelley (Paula Forrest) convinces her to run away to the city with her. Miles is devastated she has left and becomes withdrawn from everyone.

After VJ Patterson (Felix Dean) is bullied by Riley Radcliffe (Tani Edgecombe) he goes to see his father Ian (Ben Simpson) but he laughs it off. Miles is attacked and beaten and presumes it was Ian. He later finds out it was in fact Riley and his friends. He tries to drag Riley to the police station but he breaks his wrist. Miles is arrested for assault. Ian blackmails him saying he will drop the charges for money, the police find out Ian was responsible for the injuries. However the newspapers published an article on Miles branding him a thug. Miles destroys a classroom and Gina Austin (Sonia Todd) forces him to take leave. He starts drinking heavily again, makes a pass at Leah and sleeps on the beach. Miles begins having visions of a girl called Rabbit, who tells him about future events. She convinces him to do good deeds. Miles becomes good friends with Elijah Johnson (Jay Laga'aia) and he goes to Africa with him. On his return he is assaulted by Heath Braxton (Daniel Ewing). He then gets drunk and kisses Roo Stewart (Georgie Parker) and wakes up next to her in the morning. He later confesses his love to Leah and they start a relationship. Elijah is initially annoyed, but they repair their friendship. Leah learns she is pregnant, which delights Miles. Leah is initially hesitant about going ahead with the pregnancy, but she and Miles talk and she decides to keep the baby. Miles proposes to Leah, but she turns him down, saying they are not ready. She later asks him to move in with her and VJ. Leah suffers a miscarriage, which devastates Miles. The couple struggle with their grief and Miles moves out. He and Leah later break up. Miles learns Elijah is still in love with Leah. Miles tells Marilyn that Sally has got him a teaching job in Thailand and he leaves the Bay.

== Reception ==
For his portrayal of Miles, Quong Tart was nominated for "Best Newcomer" at the 2008 Inside Soap Awards. The following year he received a nomination for "Best Actor". At the 2011 Inside Soap Awards he was nominated for "Best Daytime Star". The episode where Miles conquers his fear of water to save Jai Fernandez who feigns drowning earned Writer Sean Nash an Australian Writer's Guild award nomination for "Best Television Serial" in 2009. The episode featuring Miles finally letting go of his visions of Rabbit won the Australian Writers' Guild Award in the same category the following year and was presented to the episode's writer, Sam Meikle.

The week ahead of the serial's airing, Mark Patrick of The Sun-Herald said Milco, "an imaginary friend of one of the brats" was his favorite character. Michael Idato writing for the Sydney Morning Herald said Milco being not being imaginary seemed "ludicrous". He said that Milco being revealed to be Miles, was Home and Away delivering a "plot twist equal to the genre's best." He opined that Miles' "timely" arrival softened the blow of Sally's departure. They said it was "a tender baton change that evokes memories of the iconic '80s soap Sons And Daughters" Idato later said Miles and Sally's story was an example of "strong legacy storylines" Home and Away creates.

Ruth Deller of entertainment website Lowculture placed Miles at number nine on her best characters of February 2009 list. In July 2010, she placed Miles second on her list of best soap characters. She spoke about how "ridiculous storylines" turn out to be great onscreen and referred to Miles's visions of Rabbit, which she went on to praise. She said "Miles's grief, his visions of Rabbit and his torment at everyone telling him she wasn't real were devastating to watch, and this was a really interesting avenue to take one of the soap's best-loved characters down that could have spectacularly backfired, but instead, had people bawling their eyes out." Holy Soap have said that Miles's most memorable moment is "When he found student Trey trying to kiss Kirsty, Miles pushed him and found his job as a teacher in jeopardy". The website also named Miles as one their Summer Bay hunks. In 2010, the Daily Record said that "poor old Miles" had a so many problems that "he was probably happier when everybody thought he was just sister Sally's friend". After Miles became involved with Shandi, they stated that true love "never ran smoothly in Summer Bay" and that with Shandi; Miles got "a lot more than he first bargained for". Australian television website Throng, said Miles looked completely different after Quong Tart lost weight. They said he looks "a lot older, thinner, has a new hair style and is sporting a dark beard!"

When he left the series, Sarah Ellis of Inside Soap said that Home and Away "won't be the same without Miles' shaggy barnet". Laura Morgan of All About Soap said that she and her colleagues were "in mourning" over Miles' exit. She added that they "sorely missed" him.
