= Poulis =

Poulis is a Greek surname.

== List of people with the surname ==
- Konstantinos Poulis (born 1973), Greek journalist, author, playwright and theatre practitioner
- Kostas Poulis (1928–1986), Greek footballer
- Stamatis Poulis, Greek politician

== See also ==
- Polis, Ancient Greek organisation
- Poulos (disambiguation)
