= Poulos =

Poulos, feminine: Poulou, is a Greek-origin surname. Notable people with the surname include:

- Brett Poulos, American student involved in a 2010 dispute over First Amendment rights
- Dimi Poulos, nickname of Dimitra Tsiliaskopoulos, Australian association football goalkeeper
- Ernie T. Poulos (1926–1997), American Thoroughbred horse trainer
- George R. Poulos, Michigan politician
- Georgios Poulos, Nazi collaborator during the Axis occupation of Greece
- Ioannis Poulos, Greek fencing competitor at the 1896 Summer Olympics in Athens
- Jimmy Poulos (born 1952), American player of gridiron football
- John Poulos (1947–1980), American drummer, original member of the band The Buckinghams
- Leah Poulos-Mueller (born 1951), American speed skater

== Fictional characters ==
- Alex Poulos, a fictional character from the Australian soap opera Home and Away
- Leah Poulos, birth name of Leah Patterson-Baker, another fictional character of the Australian soap opera Home and Away

== See also ==
- Poulos v. New Hampshire, a 1953 case of the Supreme Court of the United States
- -poulos, a surname suffix found in some Greek family names
