= Elijah Johnson (Home and Away) =

- Home and Away character
- Portrayed by: Jay Laga'aia
- Duration: 2010–2012
- First appearance: 11 February 2010
- Last appearance: 11 April 2012
- Introduced by: Cameron Welsh
In-universe information
- Occupation: Reverend; Missionary; Jiu-jitsu instructor
- Adoptive father: Song Johnson
- Adoptive mother: Lijuan Johnson
- Wife: Grace Johnson (until 2011)
- Stepsons: Thabo Manthenga

Elijah Johnson is a fictional character from the Australian Channel Seven soap opera Home and Away, played by Jay Laga'aia. When the serial created the character, they felt it was a role that would be well suited to Laga'aia and invited him to join the cast. Laga'aia accepted and filmed for a number of months before leaving to film for a separate project. Laga'aia agreed to return to filming in November 2010. In February 2012, it was announced Laga'aia had finished filming with Home and Away and Elijah departed on screen on 11 April 2012.

Producers created Elijah as a new love interest for established character Leah Patterson-Baker (Ada Nicodemou). Elijah arrives in Summer Bay as a new Reverend posted at the local church. He is portrayed as out of conjunction with usual roles filled by clergymen. Laga'aia said the fact that Elijah is a "6'2″ Polynesian man with a white collar" who looks more suited to playing rugby is a lot for viewers to understand. The serial has described him as being "muscular, tough and handsome with a charming smile". However, Elijah's dedication to his career has left him prone to feeling alone. Though, Elijah has been subject to a long running romantic storyline-arc in which he falls in love with Leah. In 2010, the serial focused on their journey as the couple faced problems such as prejudice from the Religious Sector, interference from Elijah's parents and the prospect of a long distance relationship. Their relationship failed as Elijah left to carry out a Missionary in Africa.

When he returned in early 2011, the serial created a new family unit around Elijah. He married Grace Johnson (Clare Chihambakwe) so she could gain access into Australia to seek medical help for her ill son. Both Laga'aia and Nicodemou said that the development had removed any hope of a reconciliation between their on-screen counterparts. The serial created a new direction for Elijah when a series of bad events leave him with nothing. Laga'aia said it was about portraying how a man's "life is turned upside down". Elijah has received mixed reviews in character analysis. The Age wrote that Laga'aia was a welcome addition to Home and Away's cast, while readership of Inside Soap magazine voted him as their least favourite Reverend in soap opera. While TV Week summed up the life of Elijah as "one bad thing after the other".

== Casting ==
In November 2009, it was announced that Jay Laga'aia had been cast into the serial to play a new local reverend, Elijah Johnson. Laga'aia had already begun filming and was set to appear on-screen in early 2010. He was also described as a potential love interest for established character Leah Patterson-Baker (Ada Nicodemou). Laga'aia was not required to audition for the role as producers wrote Elijah with him in mind. In the initial development process the writers said "He's a bit of this and a bit of that; he's a bit like Jay Laga'aia".

Laga'aia left the serial in 2010 and began filming for another television programme. Nicodemou later called for Laga'aia's character to return to the serial. In September 2010, it was announced that Laga'aia had agreed to rejoin the cast Home and Away and said he was returning to filming at the end of the month. Laga'aia later received a telephone call from the set wondering where he was. Laga'aia thought he was not due to return to filming for another week and had not read his scripts.

== Character development ==
=== Characterisation ===
Elijah doesn't fit into your stereotypical vision of a reverend – muscular, tough and handsome with a charming smile, he looks more like a jujitsu instructor than a man of the church. As it happens, Elijah is a Brazilian jujitsu instructor - he teaches self-defence classes as a hobby. But the work of God is his calling, and for Elijah that means rolling up his sleeves and dealing with the community at a practical, hands-on level.

— Yahoo!7 on Elijah

Elijah's backstory has played a factor in his characterisation. He was brought up in a "tough working-class family" who offered him a "knockabout upbringing". Elijah worked a variety of different jobs during his younger years before deciding to turn to religion. His vocation has led him to have "a particular sympathy" for people who appear to be "the underdog". Elijah has a desire to help those in society who are less fortunate. He also knows the value of money can be and always looks out for the cheapest way to help people. Elijah also has good social skills and Yahoo!7 said "there's nothing pious or holier-than-thou about Elijah; he's a likeable bloke who gets along with everyone." Elijah initially arrives in Summer Bay to run the local church. He is described as loving his job and grows to enjoy the "beautiful outdoor lifestyle" the town has to offer. However, Elijah is prone to feeling lonely because he is so focused on his career "he hasn't had time to find a special someone in his life" until he arrives in Summer Bay.

Laga'aia describes Elijah as not being a typical Reverend and when you see him in normal clothing people would mistake him for a rugby player. Laga'aia also likes watching people trying to understand the character because he is a "6'2″ Polynesian man with a white collar". He also takes inspiration from Richard Chamberlain in his approach to portraying Elijah. Laga'aia said he "loves" the character because he allows people to find their own "solutions" through talking to Elijah. He felt that was a realistic character trait that people have in life have.

=== Relationships ===
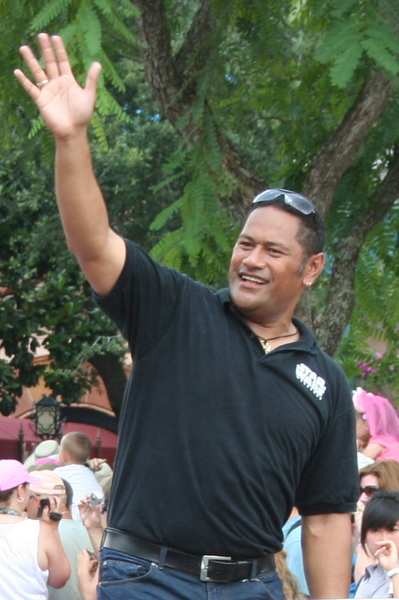
Jay Laga'aia (pictured) said that he did not think Elijah and Leah would ever reunite.

Elijah starts a relationship with Leah when she attends his self-defence classes to build her confidence. While their romance was reported in the media prior to Elijah's arrival, Nicodemou later revealed details of the storyline during an interview with Sunrise. Nicodemou was delighted about the pairing and said that "it's nice and it's really fun and happy and comedy - a lot of warm and fuzzy moments. I'm loving working with Laga'aia as well. It's all happy times ahead."

When Laga'aia's contract was coming to an end, the serial devised an exit storyline for Elijah, which involved him travelling to Africa to carry out missionary work for earthquake victims. Nicodemou explained that Elijah had carried out this type of work in his backstory, but Leah thought "he was ready to settle down". However, Elijah had been wanting to leave for a while because missionary work is "part of him". Nicodemou said that Leah's past experiences with men seal the fate of their relationship. "It's not something she feels she can compromise on any longer" because her previous husband Dan Baker (Tim Campbell) died while working abroad. She added that while Leah loves Elijah, she cannot risk Elijah suffering the same fate. As they realise a long distance relationship will not work, Leah "just thinks it is best to call the wedding off". Nicodemou said that it could have been for the best, as the serial usually decides to kill Leah's husbands off. Elijah's actions nearly ruin Leah's life as she cannot deal with their break-up. Nicodemou said "she's working herself to the bone so she doesn't have to deal with it." She collapses from stress and does not know how to cope because "Elijah helped her last time" and now she has no one.

However, Elijah later returns to Summer Bay following his time in Africa. He arrives with a new wife Grace Johnson (Clare Chihambakwe) whom he has married to help her ill son, Thabo Manthenga (Joshua Mbakwe) receive treatment. Laga'aia said that missionary work was Elijah's "calling" in life and that Leah respected that. However, upon hearing he has returned, Leah rushes to see Elijah. Laga'aia said he could empathise with Leah's feeling of "sheer disbelief" when Elijah introduced her to his new family. He added that Elijah has "jumped into a situation that might be more than he can handle". So Elijah goes to tell Leah that he is still in love with her. He then kisses Leah but she reacts badly, Laga'aia said her reaction was "understandable considering the circumstances". Laga'aia found it hard to adjust to Elijah's decision to marry Grace, he added "I just had to get my head around everything and run with it."

Elijah's actions have an effect on Leah's life. She is "very upset" because she was looking forward to seeing him again and "exploring her feelings for him". Elijah's marriage comes "out of the blue" for Leah. Out of all the things that she thought could have happened in Elijah's absence, she "definitely didn't think he would get married". She insisted that Leah and Elijah would not be reconciling their relationship. While Leah "fell very hard" and formed a life and future with Elijah, she would never take him back as a married man. Elijah "hurt her too many times" and VJ was also caught up in the heartbreak, so she would do "anything to protect her son from getting hurt" by Elijah again. Laga'aia also said that he did not think Elijah and Leah would get back together.

=== Identity crisis ===
Elijah's storyline with his new family reaches a conclusion when Thabo dies and Grace is deported. Laga'aia told Inside Soap that "Elijah only married Grace so that they could bring Thabo to Australia for medical treatment." Elijah would end the marriage if he thought he could be with Leah. However, when Thabo dies "it changes everything". Elijah and Grace are "absolutely devastated" and through their pain they sleep together. Laga'aia said it made "matters more complicated for Elijah" and he begins to question his life. He does not know how he feels about "Grace, Leah and his faith" because he asked God to save Thabo's life and he "feels that he was let down".

When the Australian authorities question Grace as to why she is in the country, she "reluctantly admits" the truth. Elijah had begun to develop feelings for Grace so her deportation is a "double blow" for him. Morag Bellingham (Cornelia Frances) discovers that Thabo reported Grace to the authorities before he died. Thabo is "the person Elijah least suspects" and is left "heartbroken" by the discovery. Elijah also thought that Leah would be back in the end, so Elijah is "left with nothing". Elijah quits his job at the church and thinks that working at the Bayside Mission will help him. Laga'aia said that Elijah "throws himself into the shelter, but it doesn't work" because he is "haunted by his mistakes". At this point Elijah has "hit rock bottom" and even starts drinking heavily. Laga'aia said the storyline was about portraying a man "whose life is turned upside down". Elijah has to "deal with the consequences" of his mistakes. The serial then planned more upset for the character when they devised a new relationship for Leah with Elijah's best friend Miles Copeland (Josh Quong Tart). Nicodemou said that Leah "worries about hurting his feeling", so Miles tells Elijah the truth. Elijah is again left "upset and angry" because he thinks his own friend has betrayed him.

=== Departure ===
In February 2012, Colin Vickery of the Herald Sun reported Laga'aia had finished filming with Home and Away the previous year. Laga'aia claimed the show had axed him because of his ethnic background. Posting on Twitter, the actor said "As someone who lost his job on H&A because they couldn't write two ethnics that weren't together, I'd like the chance to ply my trade." Vickery said the "two ethnics" were believed to be a reference to himself and Nicodemou. Channel 7 denied the claims and said "We have great regard for Jay and his work on Home and Away during the last two years. It is insulting to suggest that Home and Away is racist. His character's storyline reached a natural conclusion." On screen, Elijah struggles to be around Leah since she rejected him. Leah finds out Elijah has been talking about her to Darryl Braxton (Steve Peacocke) and following a confrontation, Elijah tells Marilyn Chambers (Emily Symons) that he has decided to leave Summer Bay for a new start. Marilyn urges Elijah to talk to Leah before he leaves. Laga'aia made his on screen exit as Elijah on 11 April 2012.

== Storylines ==
Elijah gives advice to Geoff Campbell (Lincoln Lewis), who then decides to leave Summer Bay. Elijah meets Leah at the self-defence classes he is running. Elijah offers Leah private sessions in exchange for discounts at the Diner and they become close. They initially deny their attraction to one another until Miles makes them admit their feelings. Elijah reveals to Leah that her previous husband, Vinnie Patterson (Ryan Kwanten) had died in a farming accident. His revelation gives Leah a chance to grieve for Vinnie and gives her closure. Leah and Elijah consummate their relationship, but his colleagues begin to criticise him for their relationship. Bishop (Danny Adcock) soon becomes concerned and tells Elijah he cannot be with her. However, Leah decides to challenge Bishop Pitt's views and manages to get his blessing.

Elijah decides to ask Leah to marry him, she refuses believing it is too soon. When Leah finds a ring, she ends the relationship believing that she cannot offer Elijah what he wants. Elijah talks Leah around and confesses his love for her. She changes her mind and accepts his proposal. She asks Elijah to move in and invites his parents Song (Jon-Claire Lee) and Lijuan (Mémé Thorne) to come and stay. Leah is shocked by their constant arguing and thinks that if she stays with Elijah they will end up like Song and Lijuan. Song convinces Leah that their relationship is different. Lijuan starts to use her traditional Chinese techniques to find out if Leah is compatible for Elijah. She begins to think a series of circumstantial events mean that they are not meant to be together. However, Leah and Elijah's honesty with her makes Lijuan realise that she is wrong, resulting in Lijuan and Song giving the couple their blessing.

Leah thinks that Elijah finds life in Summer Bay too quiet as there is not enough missionary work to take on. When Elijah hears that there is a crisis in West Danmar, Africa, he decides to leave and offer his services. Leah refuses to wait for Elijah and ends their relationship. Elijah returns to Summer Bay and brings home a new wife Grace and her son Thabo. It becomes apparent that Elijah has married Grace so she can enter Australia to seek medical help for Thabo, who is seriously ill. Leah is upset with Elijah and decides not to continue with their relationship while he is married to Grace. Elijah tells Leah that he loves her but she tells Elijah she cannot allow herself to be hurt by him again. Morag soon discovers the truth and warns Elijah that he is being irresponsible. Elijah decides to consummate his relationship with Grace, to try to make her happy. He soon realises he cannot be happy with her. Thabo's illness deteriorates and he dies. Grace is reported to the authorities and deported back to Africa. Elijah loses his faith and quits the church to start working at the Bayside Mission.

Elijah tries to help out Billy McVeigh (Dallas Bigelow) who arrives for shelter at the Bayside Mission. Elijah realises Billy was abused when he was younger and tries to help. Billy attacks Elijah which sees him end up in hospital. Billy is later arrested but accuses Elijah of indecent assault, but Elijah later talks to Billy and they agree to drop the charges against one another. Elijah is annoyed when his best friend, Miles begins a relationship with Leah. Elijah eventually accepts that Leah wants to be with Miles and they all become friends again. Elijah later helps Laura Carmody (Roxanne Wilson) with her fundraiser and the two become close. They decide to date each other and soon become serious. A few weeks later, Elijah presumes Laura wants him to propose to her. When he confronts her, she reveals that she thought he was going to propose and they admit it is not for them. Laura decides she wants to return to New York, leaving Elijah behind. Elijah's feelings for Leah later resurface. Miles finds out and ends their friendship, but acknowledges Elijah before he leaves the Bay.

Elijah tells Leah he still loves her, but she says that she just wants to be friends. Elijah trains Darryl Braxton for a cage fight. He and Leah later fail to stop Brax from fighting with a head injury. Elijah realises that Leah has feelings for Brax and tells him. Elijah is offered a job at another parish and accepts it. Colleen organises a farewell party on the beach and Leah makes sure they part as friends.

== Reception ==
A columnist for the Daily Record said it was no wonder that Leah went "gaga" over Elijah because he is "tall and hunky and looks as though he's no stranger to handing out cuddles." They opined that he was "too good to be true" because new characters always have secrets. Newspaper The Age opined that while "Home and Away is never going to be Emmy material", the addition of Laga'aia to the cast "certainly provided some zing". Throng said that Elijah is a noticeable character after he "made waves" with many locals, but "with none more so than with Leah". Channel 5 said that during his second stint, Elijah had "a lot on his plate" and said Thabo's death seemed to "turn his world upside down". Inside Soap asked its readers to decide who their favourite "clergyman" was out of Elijah, Hollyoaks' Father Francis (Richard Winsor) and Emmerdale's Ashley Thomas (John Middleton). Elijah was their least favourite reverend in the poll, gaining nine percent of the vote. A columnist writing for the Daily Record said that Elijah and Leah went "through a tough time getting their love on track" because of "meddling parents" and Leah's doubts about him. They added that they were "doubtful" the couple would remain together.

TV Week said that Elijah's marriage to Grace felt premature because it felt "like yesterday that Leah broke their engagement off". They added that he returned with "trouble and strife in tow". They were not keen on his treatment of Grace. When Elijah left the church said it was a "pity he didn't bother to share this news with his new wife". They opined that reporting Elijah to the authorities was a "mean-spirited betrayal" but said it was "inevitable" with the "small-town gossip" present in Summer Bay. The later said that with "poor" Elijah "it either rains or it pours" as he goes onto "one bad thing after the other".
