= Pippa Saunders =

- Home and Away character
- Piper Morrissey as Pippa (2013)
- Portrayed by: Various actors (2004–07); Chloe Marshall (2007–08); Piper Morrissey (2013)
- Duration: 2004–2008, 2013
- First appearance: 4 June 2004
- Last appearance: 5 September 2013
- Introduced by: Julie McGauran (2004); Lucy Addario (2013)
In-universe information
- Occupation: Student
- Father: Flynn Saunders
- Mother: Sally Fletcher
- Grandfathers: John Saunders; Aaron Copeland; Tom Fletcher
- Grandmothers: Rachel Saunders; Diana Wilson; Pippa Ross
- Uncles: Miles Copeland; Christopher Fletcher
- Aunts: Ashley Saunders
- First cousins: Amber Copeland

Pippa Saunders is a fictional character from the Australian soap opera Home and Away. She made her screen debut in the episode broadcast on 4 June 2004. The character was played by twelve young actors, including Chloe Marshall who took over the role in 2007. Pippa made her last regular appearance on 2 April 2008, with the character departing town off screen in the following day's episode, but returned on 15 July 2013 with Piper Morrissey now playing the role. Pippa is Flynn Saunders (Joel McIlroy) and Sally Fletcher's (Kate Ritchie) daughter.

== Casting ==
Pippa was played by twelve different child actors from her introduction in 2004 to her departure in 2008: Riley Stevens, Anouk Povaly, Noah Fraser, Isabelle Bell-Dickson, Jessica Taylor Lorenxo, Mia Szczenpanik, Leila Szczenpanik, Bojanna Main, Tameka Main, Phoebe Falconer, India Falconer and Chloe Marshall.

Pippa returned along with her mother, Sally Fletcher (Kate Ritchie), on 15 July 2013. Piper Morrissey was cast in the role. Morrissey auditioned twice for the role of Pippa. She was initially told the character she was reading for was called Poppy. Morrissey was not a regular viewer of Home and Away prior to landing the role of Pippa and she was not aware of who Ritchie was. However, they became close during filming and Morrissey commented "She was so nice. I just loved working with Kate, We kind of did act like mother and daughter."

== Storylines ==
=== 2004–08 ===
Pippa is conceived using eggs that her mother Sally had frozen before her undergoing a hysterectomy for cancer some years earlier, after her friend Leah Patterson offers to be a surrogate for Sally and her husband Flynn Saunders (Joel McIlroy). When Leah goes into labour, her ex-boyfriend Jesse has to drive her to the hospital and Sally and Flynn are initially nowhere to be found. Leah gives birth to a girl, who Sally and Flynn name Philippa or "Pippa" after Pippa Ross (Debra Lawrance).

Flynn dies of cancer a couple of years later, leaving Pippa without a father figure until Sally begins dating Brad Armstrong (Chris Sadrinna). The family move into the Caravan Park, along with Alf Stewart (Ray Meagher). Pippa is upset and shocked when Brad leaves Summer Bay and she starts talking to him, seemingly as if he is still around. Sally becomes concerned, but then remembers her own childhood imaginary friend and leaves Pippa to it. While minding Pippa, Alf goes to move his ute and is unaware that she has followed him outside. When Pippa drops her teddy bear, she goes to pick it up, just as Alf starts reversing. Alf hits Pippa and she is rushed to hospital where she has to undergo surgery. Sally decides to leave the Bay to travel around the world and she, Pippa and Cassie Turner (Sharni Vinson) depart together, eventually ending up in Thailand.

=== 2013 ===
Five years later, Sally and Pippa return to the Bay. Sally decides to show Pippa some of her favourite places like the beach, the high school and the house they lived in together. Pippa befriends Darcy Callahan (Alea O'Shea), after they meet on the beach. Sally worries that Pippa is becoming tired, but Pippa assures her that she is fine. She later forgets Darcy's name and when she drops a plate, Sally berates her for not taking a nap. Sally then reveals to Alf that Pippa has Mitochondrial disease and is dying.

Pippa convinces Sally to let her attend Summer Bay High. Leah's son VJ Patterson (Felix Dean) and his friend Jett James (Will McDonald) learn of Pippa's condition when they look at her school records. They tell Pippa they will be there for her but Sally has kept the truth from Pippa, leaving her upset. The boys feel guilty and support her. Pippa is hospitalised after having a seizure at school and Sally wants to take her to a clinic in the United States that offers an experimental treatment but has insufficient money. Pippa, who has been planning her own funeral, is upset that Sally keeps hiding the truth from her and refuses to speak to her until she agrees to be honest.

Pippa returns to school but plays truant with Jett. After Pippa's headteacher Bianca Scott (Lisa Gormley) and her fiancé Heath Braxton (Dan Ewing) set up a fund for Pippa and Darryl Braxton (Stephen Peacocke) makes a large anonymous donation, there is enough money for Sally to take her to the States. Alf's daughter Roo (Georgie Parker) arranges a farewell party at the surf club but Alf, aware he might not see Pippa again and upset when Pippa asks him to witness her will, refuses to attend. At the last minute, he changes his mind and says goodbye to Pippa and Sally on the beach.

== Reception ==
For her portrayal of Pippa, Chloe Marshall received a nomination for Best Young Actor at the 2008 Inside Soap Awards. James Joyce from the Newcastle Herald called Pippa a "medical miracle". A Daily Record reporter quipped "Pippa is one of Summer Bay's popular characters – although we hardly see her. Sally's daughter invariably pops up now and then to remind us the long-standing resident is actually a working mum and not just a dedicated headmistress." They added that "the poor lass" had been through a lot with Brad's departure and that it was only a matter of time before attention turned to her, following Sally's time in the spotlight. NowToLove.com placed Pippa's birth on their list of the "biggest, gut-wrenchingly memorable moments" in Home and Away.

Commenting on the storyline in which Alf hits Pippa with his ute, another Daily Record reporter said "The tyke appears in the odd scene or two with her mum, who only seems to either put her to bed, make her some toast or pat her on the head. It's a shame then the poor lass has to be unconscious for her biggest storyline to date. She ends up critically injured after Alf backs over her, while Sally is beside herself with anguish." The episode which dealt with the aftermath of the accident and Pippa's subsequent hospitalisation earned Sam Meikle a nomination for an Australian Writers' Guild Award in 2008.
