= Brett Poulos =

American activist

Brett Poulos was involved in a dispute over First Amendment rights. The Associated Press reported in May 2008 that he and the Foundation for Individual Rights in Education (FIRE) claim Tarrant County College "violated some students' constitutional rights by not allowing them to wear empty holsters and limiting their speech to a 12-foot-diameter (3.7 m) concrete platform, as part of a nationwide protest over campuses' ban on concealed weapons .

Poulos formerly served as a national media liaison, Southwest Regional Director, and on the Board of Directors for Students for Concealed Carry on Campus and worked to align the plaintiffs with the Foundation for Individual Rights in Education (FIRE) so they could overturn TCC's ruling. As of October 15th 2010, TCC lost the battle and was ordered to pay $240,000 in legal fees.
