= Leah Patterson-Baker =

Fictional character

Leah Patterson
- Home and Away character
- Portrayed by: Ada Nicodemou
- Duration: 2000–present
- First appearance: 22 March 2000
- Introduced by: John Holmes
- Book appearances: Home & Away: Mayday
In-universe information
- Other names: Leah Poulos; Leah Patterson-Baker
- Occupation: Chef and owner of the Diner; Youth worker
- Father: Theo Poulos
- Mother: Helen Poulos
- Brothers: Dimitri Poulos; Chris Poulos; Alex Poulos
- Husband: Vinnie Patterson (2001–2005); Dan Baker (2005–2008); Zac MacGuire (2015–2017); Justin Morgan (2024–)
- Sons: VJ Patterson
- Stepsons: Ryan Baker
- Granddaughters: Luc Patterson (legal)
- Uncles: Con Poulos
- Nephews: Theo Poulos
- First cousins: Christina Poulos; Effie
- Other relatives: Petro Poulos

Leah Patterson (also Poulos and Patterson-Baker) is a fictional character from the Australian soap opera Home and Away, played by Ada Nicodemou. She made her screen debut during the episode broadcast on 22 March 2000. Leah is one of the longest featured characters in the serial's history and has been involved in storylines including the deaths of her husbands, her many relationships, surrogacy, suffering anxiety and the victim of racism. Nicodemou took a temporary break from Home and Away in late 2012, following the birth of her first child. She returned from her break on 19 June 2013.

== Casting ==
In 1999, Nicodemou was approached by the producers of Home and Away with an offer of a six-month contract. Nicodemou was not required to audition and began filming in November that year. Before Leah appeared on-screen, Nicodemou had already been offered an extension to her contract. She had already spent four years in the cast of television programme Heartbreak High. Nicodemou took this into account when she accepted the role, only intending to remain with Home and Away for the duration of her six-month contract. However, she later decided to stay in the role because she "almost immediately fell in love with the show and the people". Ten years later, Nicodemou said was happy to carry on portraying Leah for the foreseeable future. She explained the reason behind her longevity was because Leah was "still evolving", which kept the role enjoyable.

Nicodemou is one of the longest serving cast members of Home and Away.

== Development ==
=== Introduction ===
Leah first appeared in Home and Away during the episode airing on 22 March 2000. Upon her introduction, she was described as "a girl with a big heart, a big secret and a big future that was all hers." In Nicodemou's first interview about the role, she remained secretive about plans for the character, but said Leah has "a big secret" and arrives in Summer Bay alone. Leah was given links within the serial almost immediately. Leah takes a job as a chef at the local diner and moves into a house with Vinnie Patterson (Ryan Kwanten) and Tom Nash (Graeme Squires). However, Leah "quickly realises" that her secrets will not remain her own for long because Summer Bay is a "little town". Producers decided to give Leah a "huge and juicy love story" with Vinnie, this was to help Leah settle into the serial more quickly.

=== Characterisation ===
I really love Leah. I've always said she's the type of person I'd love to have as a friend - because she allows me to play so many different areas, from comedy to drama - and also because she's one of the few single-parent characters in Australian drama. She's someone a lot of people can relate to because she's just getting on with life and dealing with problems like running a business and bringing up a son. I think she's better doing that than if everything went her way.

— Ada Nicodemou on Leah.

Yahoo!7 describe Leah as "a single mother who has a strong work ethic and stands up for what she believes in." "Leah has a confidence about her that makes her shine. She's easy going and fun loving." Also adding: "She's passionate about life and will cry at the smallest injustice and boy, can she talk! But she is also a good listener and she will always provide a shoulder to lean on." Soap opera reporting website Holy Soap describe Leah as being: "Fun, confident and passionate, Leah is a big talker and a great listener." They have also observed her as being "especially unlucky in love". The Channel Seven make-up department cut and colour Nicodemou's hair for Leah's on-screen appearance. She has also admitted that she has not control over the amount of make-up the stylists apply to get her into costume.

In 2009, Leah struggles with the pressures of life. Nicodemou said she enjoyed portraying Leah's struggle as fights to cope with "work, her son and herself". She said it makes Leah "a real character and makes her challenging to play". In 2011, Nicodemou said that she would like Leah to act out of character and become evil for a couple of episodes and have a nervous breakdown.

=== Storyline development ===
Leah and Vinnie decide to marry. Nicodemou and Kwanten were permitted to choose their own wedding attire for the wedding episodes. Nicodemou's choice of dress caused her problems while filming, because of its tight fit. After a two-week shoot in the same attire, Nicodemou revealed that she sustained bruising on her ribs from where the dress' wear. Nicodemou said that she loved Leah and Vinnie being together and said their wedding was a personal favourite scene. She also revealed that she had good chemistry with Kwanten himself, which made her enjoy the pairing more. In 2011, Nicodemou said that her favourite relationship that Leah has had was with Vinnie.

Leah marries Dan Baker (Tim Campbell). Campbell later quit the series and producers were faced with the dilemma of how to write Dan out of the serial. Dan and Leah had strong chemistry on-screen, which was popular with viewers. Producers decided to spare the "viewers' moral sensibilities" and write Dan out while he was off-screen. The storyline saw Dan die in an abseiling accident while in the US. Campbell said he "teared up" while watching the funeral scenes because he felt personally responsible because he decided to leave. He also said the only "plausible exits" for Dan were to be either killed off or have Dan being unfaithful to Leah.

In early 2009 Nicodemou revealed that Leah would have a new relationship. Leah starts dating Roman Harris (Conrad Coleby), Nicodemou said it is good for her and it was nice to see her "thinking of herself for a while". Though she noted that Leah stays true to herself and faces the realism of life and the problems she encounters. Nicodemou stated that it is more important for Leah do deal with that side of her life, "rather than just part of a relationship".

In 2010, the serial embarked on a racism storyline which saw Leah go through a series of changes. Nicodemou claimed she was interested in the storyline because it was different from anything she had done previously, she also revealed that she was pleased they had decided to deal with the issue because she could relate to the issue. Nicodemou said that she was bullied for her ethnic background as a child, so had first hand experience when it came to portraying the scenes. The storyline progresses on-screen as Leah's new love interest Hazem Kassir (Ben Kermode) is attacked in a racism riot at the diner, where Leah works, resulting in it being set on fire and burnt down. Speaking to TV Week Nicomedou discussed the impact on Leah stating: "The anxiety makes [Leah] question her job at the Diner and a whole range of stuff. Basically, she doesn't want to leave her house and her friends are really worried about her." The result is Leah's change in persona, of this Nicodemou added that viewers would see "a really broken Leah. She's usually full of heart and spirit. She's always been a real fighter" but the ordeal strips everything away from her and she cannot even cope with looking after VJ. Leah's battle with depression

=== Relationship with Elijah Johnson ===
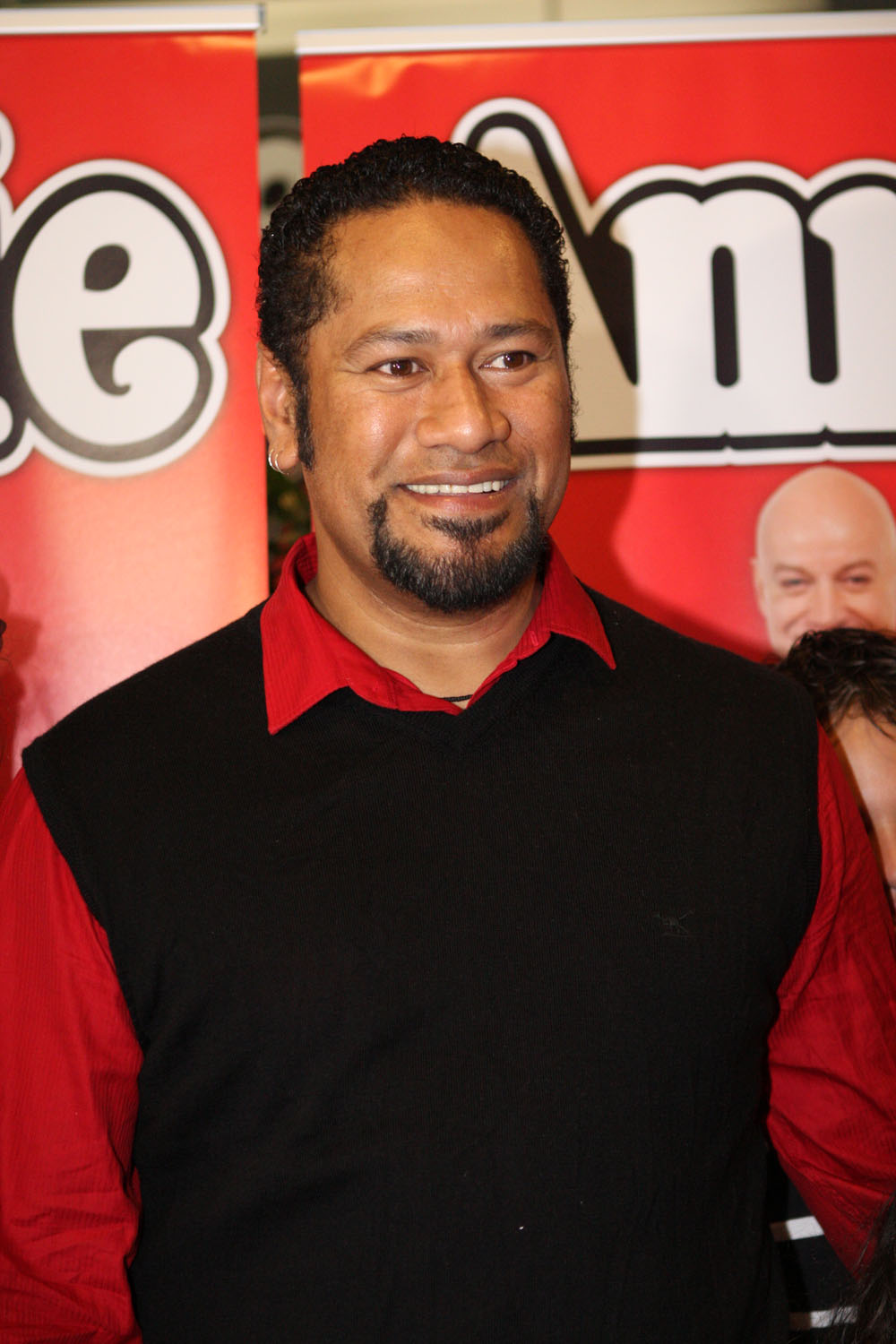
Elijah Johnson, played by Jay Laga'aia (pictured), became a new love interest for Leah following his introduction.

In November 2009, it was announced that Jay Laga'aia had been cast into the serial to play Elijah Johnson, a new local reverend and a new potential love interest for Leah. Nicodemou expressed her delight over Leah's romance with Elijah when she started ji jitsui classes to build her confidence. Speaking to Sunrise she stated: "There's a whole lot of love in the Bay and I get a love interest. It's nice and it's really fun and happy and comedy - a lot of warm and fuzzy moments. It's Jay Laga'aia and I'm loving working with him as well. It's all happy times ahead. We're moving away from the darker storylines into lighter stuff." When their relationship ends, Leah begins dating Robert Robertson (Socratis Otto), however, Nicodemou said that she believed that Leah was still in love with Elijah.

However, Elijah later returns to Summer Bay following time in Africa. He arrives with a new wife Grace Johnson (Clare Chihambakwe) whom he has married to help her ill son, Thabo Manthenga (Joshua Mbakwe) receive treatment. Leah is "very upset" because she was looking forward to seeing him again and "exploring her feelings for him". Elijah being married comes "out of the blue" for Leah as she "definitely didn't think he would get married". Nicodemou insisted that Leah and Eljiah would not be reconciling their relationship. While Leah "fell very hard" and formed a life and future with Elijah, she would never take him back as a married man. Eljah "hurt her too many times" and VJ was also caught up in the heartbreak, so she would do "anything to protect her son from getting hurt" again.

=== Relationship with Miles Copeland ===
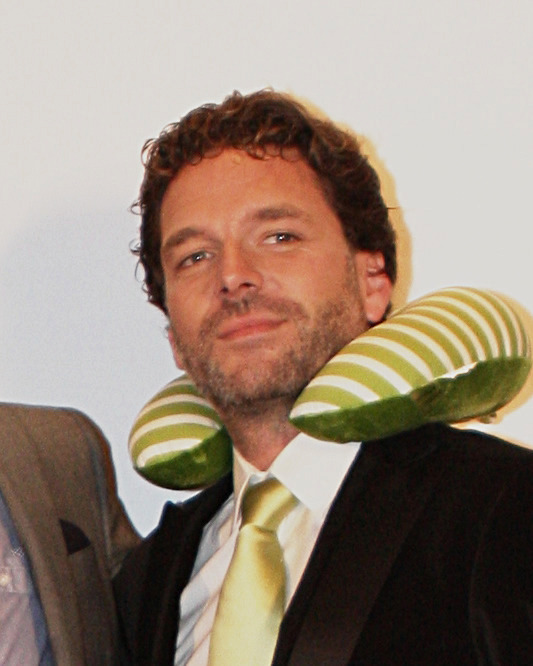
In 2011, Leah dates Miles Copeland, played by Josh Quong Tart (pictured).

In January 2011, Josh Quong Tart revealed his character, Miles Copeland, was set to have a new love interest with someone who may live in Summer Bay. Quong Tart said Miles is "more surprised than anyone that it happens." While Nicodemou revealed that Leah would fall in love with someone new, rather than Elijah again. Nicodemou explained that Leah and Miles have tried to get together in the past, but the timing has never been right for them. However, Miles has always been there for Leah and is regarded as a father figure to VJ. The actress later told RTÉ TEN that she thinks Miles and Leah are well suited and hoped they find happiness with each other. She explained "They have been great friends for a long time and I think it's a great start to a relationship." Miles and Leah discuss their situation and Leah decides to take the first step and kisses Miles to see if they have any chemistry. Nicodemou said Leah is worried about the decision for them to take their relationship further, but she realises that she and Miles do have chemistry and they begin dating.

In August 2011, Leah discovers she is pregnant. Digital Spy reported Leah is "left stunned" by the positive pregnancy test result. Of Leah learning she is pregnant, Nicodemou explained, "At first, she doesn't know she's pregnant - she's just hormonal and being a bitch to Miles and needs time to herself. When she does realise she's pregnant, she doesn't want it. That might be an unpopular choice for most people and it can be hard to understand where Leah is coming from, but she doesn't want to be put in that situation at all. She's not happy about being pregnant." Leah realises that she does not want a baby as she previously had a miscarriage after struggling to fall pregnant. Leah took that badly and it made her decide not to have children again. Nicodemou said the impact the storyline would have on Miles and Leah is interesting and things become more serious for them. A week later it was announced Miles would propose to Leah in a bid to solidify their relationship. Leah is surprised by the proposal, which occurs at the pier, and she is left to make a decision over her future with Miles. Nicodemou said Leah is not thinking about marriage at that stage of their relationship. Leah later suffers a miscarriage and blames Miles for convincing her to keep the baby.

Leah also feels guilty for initially suggesting she have an abortion. Nicodemou told TV Week that Leah believes that she should set Miles free because she does not want him to miss out on being a father again. Miles has a "total shock" when Leah gives him an ultimatum. She also sees ending their relationship as an "easy option" rather than dealing with her "guilt and grief". Quong-Tart later announced his departure from the serial, meaning that Leah and Miles may not have a future together.

== Storylines ==
After running away from her wedding to Ted Simos (Harry Pavlidis), Leah is hitchhiking when she is picked up by Vinnie Patterson, who takes her to Summer Bay. They start a relationship, marry, and have a son called VJ (Felix Dean), they later find out VJ is deaf. Vinnie's father Ralph (Alan Cinis) scams him, he is convicted and sent to prison. Whilst in prison Vinnie dies leaving Leah to cope alone. Leah later finds out Vinnie is alive and on witness protection. Leah's brother Alex (Danny Raco) also comes to live with her. Leah then begins a relationship with Jesse McGregor (Ben Unwin), they remain together in a good relationship. Leah then acts as a surrogate mother for Sally, giving birth to Pippa Saunders (Mia Fitzpatrick), but when she hands the child over to Sally, Jesse cannot deal with it and ends their relationship. She later dates Peter Baker (Nicholas Bishop), then his brother Dan. They later marry, when they plan to emigrate to America Dan heads out first to search for a perfect home for their family and to start his new job. Whilst abseiling Dan has a tragic accident and dies off-screen, leaving Leah devastated again. Leah begins a new relationship with Hazem Kassir but it is cut short when he is accused of being a terrorist and is severely beaten up by racist drunks who set the diner alight. Hazem is hospitalized and later transferred to another hospital in the city. Leah becomes depressed and scared to leave her house because of her fear. Her friends rally around her and help her through. She meets Elijah and begins a relationship with him and they become engaged.

When Charlie Buckton (Esther Anderson) is shot dead by Jake Pirovic (Fletcher Humphrys), Darryl Braxton (Steve Peacocke) struggles to get over her and begins drinking. During this time Leah feels that she needs to help Brax and so she does. Leah overhears Geoffrey King (Geoff Morrell) talking to Brax saying he owes King money. Leah gets in contact with King and gives him the money that Brax owes him in exchange for leaving Brax alone. After this Brax finds out and tells Leah that he doesn't owe King any money and that he was just bluffing. So Brax feels bad that he owes Leah money so he says to her that he will pay her back when he gets the money. To pay her back, Brax begins to cage fight and Leah finds out and is unhappy but Brax continues to fight until he gives her all the money. During this, time Leah helps him when he gets beat up and while helping him she starts to fall for him. Roo Stewart (Georgie Parker) sees this and talks to Leah about it and Leah admits to Roo that she has feelings for Brax. Leah know that she should move on so she eventually joins an online dating site and goes out with a guy but finds him boring. She and her son VJ left Summer Bay after Adam Sharpe's son Jamie threatened VJ and didn't say goodbye to anyone. Months later, she and VJ return to Summer Bay, only to be greeted with a broken window in her home and heard a sound and grabbed a frying pan and saw it was Kyle Braxton (Nic Westaway), Zac and Natalie's housemate and apologized for scaring him, but he revealed that he was just going to see someone. Kyle later moved out and Casey's girlfriend Tamara Kingsley moved in, hoping to get her memories back.

Most of the members of the Bay get on a bus and head to the location where Phoebe Nicholson will perform. However, on the way there Sophie (heading towards the Bay with Nate) tries to get out of the car and Nate swerves to avoid crashing into the bus. The bus rolls down a hill and Leah is thrown out of the bus and is the last person found. She is quickly transferred to a hospital in the city, after not waking up. VJ is told that she can not breathe on her own and most likely will not wake. VJ then tells Zac that he will move in with his grandmother so he could be close to his mum, but just as they are about to move out, Leah wakes up.

Leah starts to act strangely and confides in Nate about her experience in hospital. She is then diagnosed with an aneurysm and needs surgery to fix it, but she refuses to as she doesn't want to put her family in anymore turmoil. She then runs away into the bush and falls. The bay residents search for her and find her unconscious. She then decides to have the surgery. During surgery, some complications occur and she goes into cardiac arrest. The brain surgeon, Sean Gleeson feels bad and beats himself up for it, but Hannah Wilson reassures him that it wasn't his fault. Leah manages to survive the surgery. Zac then proposes to Leah with a romantic gesture on the beach in front of everyone. She says no, but VJ convinces her to marry him and she then proposes to him at home and they become engaged.

During the wedding ceremony, Zac's ex-girlfriend Charlotte King (Erika Heynatz) threatens to reveal everyone's secrets. Leah supports Zac when he becomes prime suspect in Charlotte's murder, and feuds with Senior Constable Kat Chapman (Pia Miller), who sides with Detective Dylan Carter (Jeremy Lindsay Taylor). Leah and Zac's marriage ends after he has an affair with his publisher Samantha Webster (Cheree Cassidy). Zac and Leah divorce and Zac moves to Vietnam, with his niece Evelyn MacGuire (Philippa Northeast).

After Leah and Justin win a trip away they are kidnapped by Vita Nova and are dumped in an abandoned factory used by the cult and they are later rescued from a Vita Nova stronghold in the middle of nowhere, Justin fights for his life as Leah stays by his side. When Justin almost dies he sees Leah at his funeral and it scares him. Leah returns to the hospital where she learns that a member of Vita Nova named Jordan disguised himself as a nurse and almost smothers him but is stopped by Rose and the hospital security, Leah asks if that is the last of Vita Nova and Rose says that the last members of Vita Nova have been arrested as Jordan didn't cover his tracks properly. Leah begins suffering from nightmares and even has a panic attack. Leah knows something is wrong and wants the help of Bree, Leah asks Bree if she can give her sleeping tablets and when Bree tells that it will only mask the issue, Leah tells her to forget it. Things come to a head when Leah suffers a psychotic episode and threatens Justin with a knife in the diner. Leah is taken to hospital where she goes into treatment at a mental health facility.

== Reception ==
Nicodemou has received several award nominations for her performance as Leah. She was nominated for the Gold Logie Award for Most Popular Personality on Australian Television at the 2001, 2002 and 2006 Logie Awards, and also received "Most Popular Actress" nominations in 2002 and 2006. She was nominated for the "Best Actress" award at the 2009 Inside Soap Awards. At the 2010, 2011 and 2015 ceremonies she was nominated in the category of "Best Daytime Star". Leah and Irene's friendship won the 2015 TV Week and Soap Extra #OMGAward for Best BFFs. In August 2017, Nicodemou was longlisted for Best Daytime Star at the Inside Soap Awards. The nomination did not progress to the viewer-voted shortlist. In May 2022, Nicodemou received a nomination for Most Popular Actress at the 2022 Logie Awards. She was nominated in the same category in 2023. In 2025, Leah and Justin received a "Best Soap Couple" nomination at the Digital Spy Reader Awards.

In her book Soap Stars, Debbie Foy refers to Leah as having lived through several dramatic episodes. In Andrew Mercado's book, Super Aussie Soaps, he describes Leah as seemingly arriving with an army of Greek relatives, in his opinion it was the introduction of Leah that marked the first time the serial had bothered to include a multicultural community. Holy Soap describe Leah's most memorable moment as being when: "Finding out her beloved Vinnie had died in pokey." TV Week named Leah and Vinnie as one of soap's "Odd Couples". They said "Vinnie was the local goofball working as a stripper. Leah was the responsible Greek girl. They lived together as flatmates and she found herself falling for his quirkiness." Erin Miller writing for TV Week said the week commencing 21 February 2011, was a "huge week" for Leah. She had many dramas and Miller said "poor Leah hit the roof" when she found out Elijah and Miles had been lying to her. TV Week later said Leah's love life was finally looking good with Miles and noted that she is "notorious for getting her heart broken."

In 2007, when Leah was unsure whether or not to leave Summer Bay, Melissa Gaudron writing for The Sydney Morning Herald branded her the "forever indecisive Leah" and said she wanted her to leave the soap opera altogether. While her colleague, Greg Hassell opined that Home and Away was "surprisingly well produced and acted" and that it benefited from the "steadying influence of old-time cast members" such as Nicodemou. Sasha Molitorisz said that Leah tries so hard to be a good mum that "she's forgetting she may occasionally need some sleep". Jim Schembri of The Age said Nicodemou is a "Home and Away long hauler". He opined that Dan made Leah "so happy so quickly" in comparison to Jesse, who he said failed to make her happy "after two years of trying".

The Sydney Morning Herald's Stuart O'Connor criticised the episode of Home and Away that Leah gives birth to VJ. He said the acting was "woeful" and vowed never to watch another episode of the serial. A columnist writing for the Daily Record said that Leah and Elijah went "through a tough time getting their love on track" because of "meddling parents" and Leah's doubts about him. They added that they were "doubtful" the couple would remain together. Tahlia Pritchard from Punkee stated that Home and Away always guaranteed its viewers a four things, which were "Alf, for one. Marilyn always smiling even if she’s angry or upset. Leah having something tragic happen to her because she can’t get a break. And some shirtless, good looking men." Chloe Timms from Inside Soap believed that Leah and Justin were "meant to be".
