= Konstantinos Poulis =

Greek journalist, author, playwright, and theater practitioner

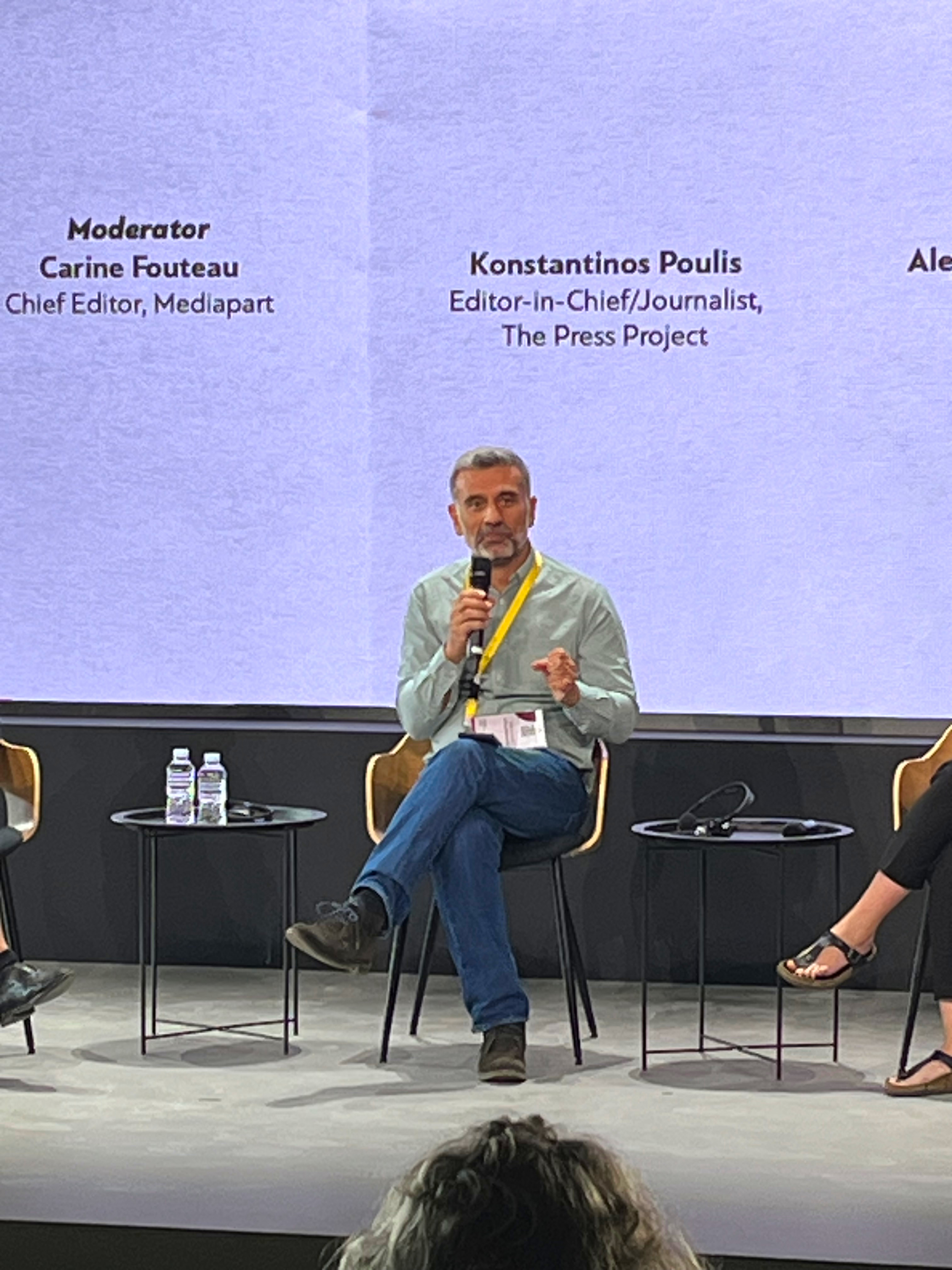
Konstantinos Poulis as a speaker, at the iMEdD International Journalism Forum 2023.

Konstantinos Poulis (Greek: Κωνσταντίνος Πουλής; born 1973) is a Greek journalist, author, playwright and theater practitioner. He is best known for his political and cultural commentary and analysis of issues related to the ongoing Greek government-debt crisis. He is also host and head writer of the YouTube show Anaskopisi (Roundup), a satirical news show that in style and tone resembles American satirical programming such as The Daily Show, The Colbert Report, and Last Week Tonight.

He serves as editor of the online news outlet ThePressProject since 2017, which was founded by journalist Kostas Efimeros. In addition, he co-hosts with Thanos Kamilalis the daily political commentary program I Farma ton Zoon ("The Animal Farm"), which is broadcast through ThePressProject.

== Bibliography ==
=== Books ===
- Social Media: The Freedom to Speak Without Being Heard, Gutenberg Publications, Athens, 2025
- The Sip and the Glass ("Η γουλιά και το ποτήρι"), Melani Publications, Athens, 2022
- From the Plough to the Smartphone: Conversations with My Father ("Απ’ το αλέτρι στο smartphone, Συζητήσεις με τον πατέρα μου"), Melani Publications, Athens, 2019
- The Thermostat ("Ο θερμοστάτης"), Melani Publications, Athens, 2014
- Tax the Ragpickers ("Φόρο στους ρακοσυλλέκτες"), The Press Project Publications, Athens, 2013
- The Present of the Past and the Present of the Future: Four Texts on Giannis Kiourtsakis ("Το παρόν του παρελθόντος και το παρόν του μέλλοντος – Τέσσερα κείμενα για τον Γιάννη Κιουρτσάκη") (collective volume, contributor), Koukida Publications, Athens, 2011
- Don Juan ("Δον Ζουάν"), Koukida Publications, Athens, 2010
