= Felix Dean =

Australian child actor

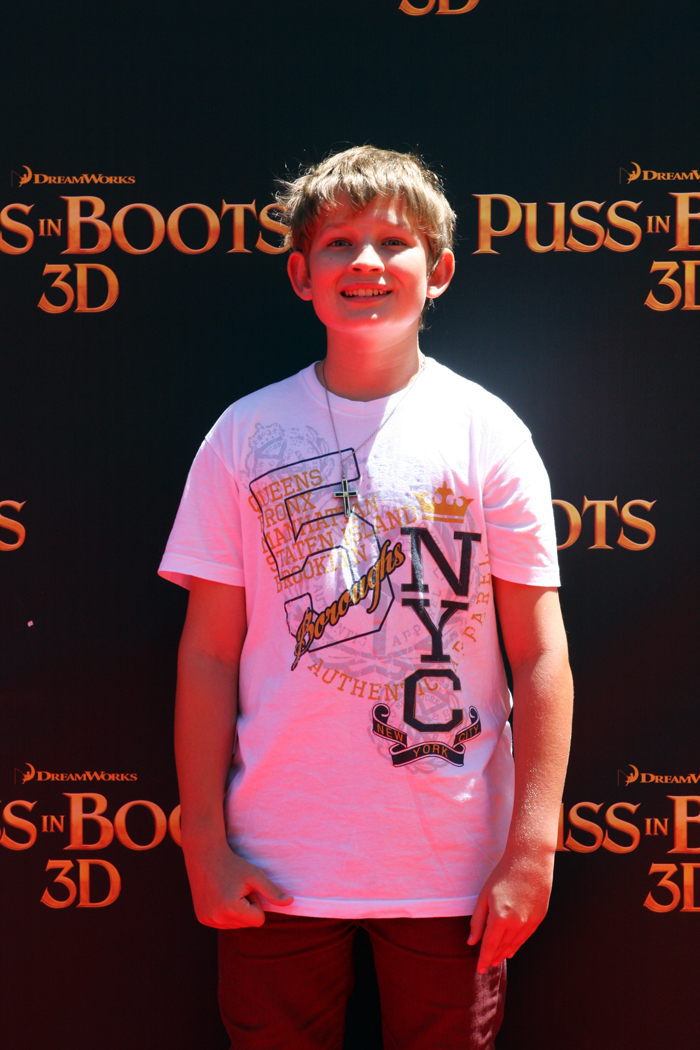
- Dean at the Puss in Boots premiere in Australia (2011)
- Born: 27 June 1997 (age 28); Sydney, Australia
- Occupation: Actor
- Years active: 2004–2014

Felix Dean (born 27 June 1997) is a former Australian child actor, known for playing VJ Patterson in the soap opera Home and Away from 2007 and 2014. He also appeared in the sketch comedy series Comedy Inc..

== Biography ==
=== Early and personal life ===
Dean was born in Sydney, New South Wales on 27 June 1997. He lives in Erskineville with his family.

On 13 October 2021, Joe Anderton of Digital Spy reported that Dean had been arrested for allegedly attacking a store worker. He was charged with a number of offences, including affray, shoplifting, and breaching bail; the conditions of which included a curfew and drug and alcohol tests. Dean had previously been arrested in September and charged with intent to rob and common assault. He was also charged with property damage relating to an alleged incident with a taxi driver in January 2021. Dean was refused bail and was scheduled to appear in court on 19 October 2021.

=== Early career ===
In 2004, Dean appeared in the television miniseries, Jessica, based on the novel by Bryce Courteney. Two years later he appeared as a guest in medical drama All Saints as Todd McFarlane. In 2007, Dean made several appearances in the sketch comedy series Comedy Inc..

=== Home and Away ===
Dean, in 2007 joined the cast of television series Home and Away, when we was given the role of VJ Patterson. For his portrayal of VJ, he was nominated for Best Young Actor at the 2008 and 2009 Inside Soap Awards. He left the serial in 2014 and the role of VJ was recast.

=== Other roles ===
In November 2011, Dean joined the cast of Sam Atwell's play, Bondi Dreaming. The play ran at the Bondi Pavilion until 3 December 2011. he has appeared also in several television commercials.

== Filmography ==
Year	Title	Role	Notes
2004	Jessica	Joey Thomas (aged 6)	Miniseries
2004	Gabriel	Gabriel	Short film
2006	All Saints	Todd McFarlane	Season 9, episode 38: "Breaking Point"
2007–14	Home and Away	VJ Patterson	Season 20–27 (recurring, 188 episodes)
2007	Comedy Inc.		Season 1 (recurring, 5 episodes)
