= Josh Quong Tart =

Australian actor (born 1975)

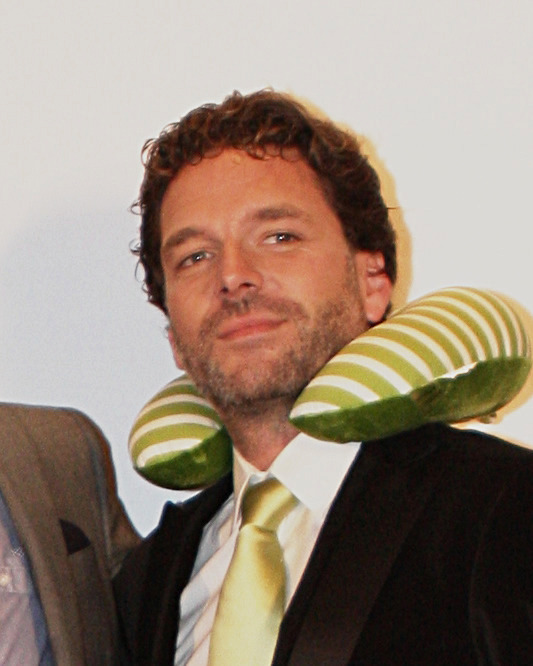
- Tart in 2011
- Born: 18 September 1975 (age 51); Sydney, Australia
- Education: McDonald College; NIDA (1994–1997)
- Occupation: Actor
- Years active: 1992–present
- Known for: headLand; All Saints; Home and Away
- Family: Mei Quong Tart (ancestor)

Josh Quong Tart (born 18 September 1975) is an Australian actor.

== Early life ==
Tart attended the McDonald College before he was accepted into National Institute of Dramatic Art (NIDA) in 1994, graduating in 1997 with a bachelor's degree in Performing Arts. He is a descendant of Chinese Australian Mei Quong Tart, who ran a popular tea house in the Queen Victoria Building in Sydney, and was also an early Chinese ambassador to Australia.

== Career ==
Tart's list of television credits includes the role of Will Monk on headLand, a drama series airing on the Seven Network and Matt Horner on the Australian award-winning series All Saints. Josh was also an original co-host on the kids TV show Sarvo with Jamie Croft on Foxtel's Nickelodeon.

Quong Tart featured alongside actress Genevieve Lemon and brother Byron Tart in the stage show, Lemon Tart in 2006 and 2007. Tart joined the cast of Home and Away in 2007 as Miles "Milco" Copeland. In October 2011, Tart announced he was departing Home and Away after nearly four years.

In 2012, Tart joined the cast of Underbelly: Badness as Andrew Perish.

In August 2013, it was announced that Tart would play Scar in the 2013–16 Australian production of Disney's The Lion King (nicknamed the 'Antelope Tour'), premiering in Sydney at The Capitol Theatre in December 2013. The show also played in Melbourne, Brisbane and Perth and closed in January 2016.

Tart starred in Betty Blokk-Buster Reimagined during the 2020 Sydney Festival. Sydney Morning Herald critic, Harriet Cunningham, called his performance "simply extraordinary" and "a revelation".

== Filmography ==
=== Film ===
Year	Title	Role	Notes
2003	Syntax Error	Desmond	Short film
2010	Shock	Shitstick	Short film; also associate producer, co-producer
2012	Prick	—N/a	Short film; producer only
2013	Around the Block	Barry Griffen	Feature film
2014	Notes	Gerrard	Short film
2015	Bronzer	Lucien Joplin-Stutt	Short film
2016	Scare Campaign	Trent / Rohan	Feature film
2016	Down Under	Video Porn Star 2 / Police Officer	Feature film
2018	Love and Other Places	Josh / Jacinta	Short film
2019	Little Monsters	Echidna Man	Feature film
2019	Dark Place	Doctor	Feature film; segment: "Foe"
2023	Late Night with the Devil	Leo Fiske	Feature film
202?	Ugly Carter	Ian	

=== Television ===
Year	Title	Role	Notes
1992	Home and Away	Kevin	Season 5, 1 episode
1992	The Leaving of Liverpool	Thug	Miniseries
1993	Home and Away	Pool Shark	Season 6, 1 episode
1998	Wildside	Tom	Season 1, episode 18
1999	All Saints	Vincent Sterling	Season 2, episode 27
1999	Chameleon II: Death Match	Connor	TV movie
2001	Water Rats	Yo	Season 6, episode 18: "Robbo's Ghost"
2001–2004	All Saints	Matt Horner	Seasons 4–5, 45 episodes (recurring), Season 6, 23 episodes (main), Season 7, 1 episode (guest)
2001	Young Lions	Dr. Martin	Season 1, episode 1
2004	McLeod's Daughters	Grant Meldrum	Season 4, episode 27: "Something to Prove"
2004–2009	Master Raindrop	Flamo	26 episodes (main)
2005	Flipper & Lopaka	Voice	Season 1, episode 20
2005–2006	headLand	Will Monk	Seasons 1–2, 58 episodes (main)
2007–2011	Home and Away	Miles Copeland	Seasons 20–24, 741 episodes (main)
2012	The Great Mint Swindle	Brian Mickelberg	TV movie
2012	Underbelly: Badness	Andrew 'Undies' Perish	Underbelly Season 5, 8 episodes (main)
2014	Rake	Detective Sando	Season 3, episode 8
2016	Hyde & Seek	Dale	Miniseries, season 1, episode 3
2016	Fancy Boy	President Ryan	Season 1, episode 2
2018	Riot	Ron Austin	TV movie
2018	Mr Inbetween	Luke Henson	Season 1, episode 2: "Unicorns Know Everybody's Name"
2020	Reckoning	Dr. Hartman	Miniseries, season 1, 2 episodes
2020–2021	Rosehaven	Donovan	Season 4, 2 episodes
2021	Born to Spy	Tradie	Miniseries, season 1, episode 6
2022	Wolf Like Me	Homeless Man	Season 1, episode 1
2022	The Twelve	Harmon	Miniseries, season 1, episode 6
2024	Last Days of the Space Age	Gary 'Gazza' Cullis	4 episodes
2024	Plum	Larry	Miniseries, episode 5: "The Tree"

=== Theatre ===
Year	Title	Role	Notes
1994	Elvis The Musical	Vocalist	Footbridge Theatre, Sydney
1995	Playing with Fire		NIDA Parade Theatre, Sydney
1996	The Philistines	Bessemenov	NIDA Parade Studio, Sydney
1996	The Wild Duck	Dinner Guest	NIDA Parade Studio, Sydney
1996	Richard III	Clarence / Ghost Clarence / Rivers	NIDA Parade Studio, Sydney
1996	The Caucasian Chalk Circle		NIDA Parade Theatre, Sydney
1996	The Bear	Smirnoff	Bondi Pavillion with NIDA Parade Theatre, Sydney
1997	The Hostage	Monsewer	NIDA Parade Theatre, Sydney
1997	Bad Boy Johnny	Vocalist	Enmore Theatre, Sydney
1998	La Dispute	Azor	St Stephen's Church, Sydney with STC
	Wildtracks	Various characters	
	The Starry Messenger	Rinnucini	STC
	The Kosky Project	Various characters	
1999	This Lime Tree Bower	Frank	Ensemble Theatre, Sydney
1999	Old Wicked Songs	Stephen Hoffman	Playhouse, Canberra, Marian Street Theatre
2001	Shakespeare’s R & J	Mercutio / Friar Laurence	Sydney Opera House with Bell Shakespeare Company
2004	The Miser	La Fleche	Sydney Opera House with STC
2006	The Hanging of Jean Lee	Norman	Sydney Opera House with The Studio/ABC
2006	Mother Courage and Her Children	Various characters	STC
2006–2007	Lemon Tart	Vocalist	Statement Cabaret Lounge, Sydney
2007	Troupers	Walter	Wharf Theatre with STC
2008	Killer Joe	Ansel / Earl	Belvoir Street Theatre, Sydney
2010	Our Town	Mr Webb	Sydney Opera House with STC
2011	Rope	Rupert Cadell	Bondi Pavilion, Sydney with Tamarama Rock Surfers
2012	The Wharf Revue 2012 - Red Wharf: Beyond the Rings of Satire	Various characters	Lennox Theatre, Parramatta, Dame Joan Sutherland Performing Arts Centre, Penrith, Canberra Theatre Centre, Wharf Theatre with STC
2013–2015	The Lion King	Scar	Capitol Theatre, Sydney, Lyric Theatre, Brisbane, Regent Theatre, Melbourne, Crown Theatre, Sydney
2016	Xanadu	Danny Maguire	Hayes Theatre Co, Sydney
2017	The Judas Kiss	Oscar Wilde	Old Fitzroy Theatre, Sydney with Red Line Productions
2017	Muriel's Wedding	Ken	STC World Premiere
2019	Dead Cat Bounce	Gabriel	Stables Theatre, Sydney with Griffin Theatre Company
2020	Betty Blokk-Buster Reimagined	Betty	Magic Mirrors Spiegeltent, Sydney with Red Line Productions for Sydney Festival
2022–2023	Amadeus	The Venticelli	Sydney Opera House
