= Ada Nicodemou =

Australian actress (born 1977)

- Άντα Νικοδήμου
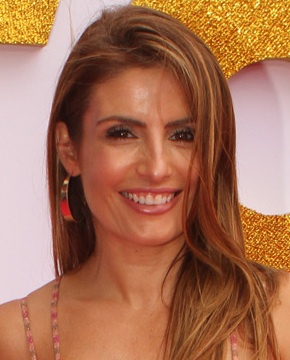
- Nicodemou in 2018
- Born: 14 May 1977 (age 49); Carlton, New South Wales, Australia
- Occupation: Actress
- Years active: 1993–present
- Notable work: Heartbreak High; Breakers; Home and Away
- Spouse: Chrys Xipolitas (m. 2007; div. 2015)
- Partner(s): Adam Rigby (2016–2023); James Stewart (2024–present)
- Children: 1

Ada Nicodemou (Greek: Άντα Νικοδήμου) (born 14 May 1977) is an Australian actress. She began her acting career in 1994 in TV serial Heartbreak High as Katerina Ioannou. She also starred in Police Rescue and Breakers.

Since 2000, Nicodemou has played the role of Leah Patterson in the soap opera Home and Away. In 2012, she hosted reality series Please Marry My Boy.

== Early life ==
Nicodemou was born on 14 May 1977 in Carlton, a suburb of Sydney. Nicodemou's parents were both migrants who met in Australia. Her Greek Cypriot family comes from Limassol. Nicodemou grew up in Minto along with her younger brother. Nicodemou attended The Grange Public School, and the Johnny Young Talent School, where she learned to sing, dance and act.

== Career ==
Nicodemou began her acting career in 1994 when she was cast as Katerina Ioannou in ABC1's Heartbreak High. Nicodemou was 16 when she successfully auditioned for the role. She was originally contracted to play the part for 12 weeks, but this was later extended.

In 1995, she joined the supporting cast of Police Rescue as receptionist Anastasia "Ana" Skouras. Nicodemou also had a starring role on Network Ten's Breakers. In 1999, she played Dujour in the science fiction film The Matrix, and during the following year, she appeared in an episode of children's series BeastMaster.

Nicodemou has played the role of Leah Patterson in the television soap opera Home and Away since 22 March 2000. Nicodemou originally auditioned for the role of Sarah Thompson in 1992, but Laura Vasquez was cast. She was later approached by the show's producers about the role of Leah. She was not asked to audition and was offered a six-month contract, which was soon extended. As of 2019, Nicodemou is one of the show's longest serving actors.

In 2005, Nicodemou competed on and won the 3rd season of Dancing with the Stars with partner Aric Yegudkin. From 2012, Nicodemou hosted Channel Seven's reality series Please Marry My Boy. She made a guest appearance in an episode of Drop Dead Weird in 2018.

In February 2021, it was announced Nicodemou would compete on Seven's Dancing with the Stars: All Stars with her original partner Yegudkin. In August 2022, Nicodemou made a guest appearance on Home and Away podcast, Welcome to the Bay.

Nicodemou is also the author of two children's books; her first book titled Johnas The International Soccer Star, was released June 2018. The picture book is about her son dreaming of becoming a soccer legend. Her second book Mia Megastar will be released in April 2024. The book is loosely based on Nicodemou's life and how she became an actress.

== Personal life ==
Nicodemou married Chrys Xipolitas in 2007. They separated in 2010, but reconciled the following month. On 22 August 2012, Nicodemou gave birth to the couple's first child, a son. In March 2014, it was announced that the couple were expecting their second child. On 7 August, Nicodemou revealed that their second son had been stillborn. Nicodemou and Xipolitas separated in late 2015.

Nicodemou was in a relationship with businessman Adam Rigby from 2016 until 2023. In July 2024, Nicodemou confirmed via Stellar magazine that she was in a relationship with her Home and Away co-star James Stewart. Nicodemou and Stewart announced their engagement on 15 February 2026.

Since 2005, Nicodemou has been an ambassador of the PixiFoto Foundation that raises funds for a Childhood Blindness Prevention program in Africa. She is also an ambassador for Save our Sons, a charity supporting Duchenne muscular dystrophy and the National Breast Cancer Foundation. She is also a supporter of the Starlight Children's Foundation and Make-A-Wish Foundation Australia.

== Filmography ==
Television and film roles
Year	Title	Role	Notes
1994–1997	Heartbreak High	Katerina "Kat" Ioannou	Main role (season 1, 3–5) 90 episodes
1995	Police Rescue	Anastasia Skouras	Main role (season 4) 15 episodes
1998–1999	Breakers	Fiona Motson	Main role: 9 episodes
1999	The Matrix	Dujour	Feature film
2000	BeastMaster	The Nymph	Episode: "Riddle of the Nymph"
2000	Pizza	Policewoman	Episode: "Crime Pizza"
2000–present	Home and Away	Leah Patterson-Baker	Series Regular (3,100+ Episodes)
2007	Almost	Trixie Hart	Feature film
2017	Drop Dead Weird	Ava	Episode: "The Zombie Queen"

== Awards and nominations ==
Year	Association	Category	Work	Result	Ref
2001	Logie Awards	Most Popular Personality on Australian Television	Home and Away	Nominated	
2002	Logie Awards	Most Popular Actress	Home and Away	Nominated	
2002	Logie Awards	Most Popular Personality on Australian Television	Home and Away	Nominated	
2006	Logie Awards	Most Popular Actress	Home and Away	Nominated	
2006	Logie Awards	Most Popular Personality on Australian Television	Home and Away	Nominated	
2022	Logie Awards	Most Popular Actress	Home and Away	Nominated	
2023	Logie Awards	Most Popular Actress	Home and Away	Nominated	
2023	Inside Soap Awards	Best Daytime Star	Home and Away	Nominated	

Preceded by Tom Williams & Kym Johnson	Dancing with the Stars (Australia) winner Season 3 (Late 2005 with Aric Yegudkin)	Succeeded by Grant Denyer & Amanda Garner
