= Episode 6361 (Home and Away) =

- Home and Away episode
- Episode no.: Season 29; Episode 6361
- Directed by: Bill Hughes
- Written by: Dan Bennett
- Original air date: 15 February 2016
- Running time: 22 minutes

Guest appearances
- Phoenix Lumsden and Dante Trovato as Casey Braxton

Episode chronology
← Previous; Episode 6360	Next → Episode 6362

Episode 6361 of the Australian television soap opera Home and Away was broadcast on the Seven Network on 15 February 2016. It was written by Dan Bennett and directed by Bill Hughes. The episode is the serial's first two-hander and focuses on a single conversation between Ricky Sharpe (Bonnie Sveen) and Darryl "Brax" Braxton (Stephen Peacocke), who has returned to Summer Bay six months after faking his death. It was billed as a "Valentine's Day themed episode" as it centres on the love story between Brax and Ricky, and the consequences of Brax's decision to disappear and leave Ricky as a single mother to their son.

The episode features the return of Peacocke whose original exit scenes aired in June 2015. He agreed to reprise his role after the producers pitched him a good storyline that was "a nice book end" for his character. Peacocke also admitted that he reprised his role out of gratitude to Home and Away for launching his career. He later teased that Brax's return storyline saying it was something that had not been done on the show before and that it had been skilfully done. Sveen enjoyed working with Peacocke on the episode and said filming the two-hander was a highlight of the year for her. Peacocke reckoned Episode 6361 would give closure to fans of Brax and Ricky, while Sveen hoped her character would think with her head and not her heart, as she is presented with the dilemma of whether to stay in the Bay or leave with Brax.

Episode 6361 was watched by 946,000 viewers, becoming the fourth most watched program on the Seven Network that day. It was called a "special episode" by Tiffany Dunk of the Herald Sun, who said it answered every question she had about Brax and Ricky. news.com.au's Holly Byrnes branded the episode "history-making" and reckoned it resolved the couple's "tortured storyline". Digital Spy's Laura Morgan branded Episode 6361 "brilliant and highly-charged".

== Plot ==
Upon seeing Brax, Ricky runs outside and he apologises for scaring her, but he wanted to see her. Ricky asks him how he could let her think he was dead for six months. Inside, Brax closes the blinds, but Ricky tells him everyone is out for the night, while their son Casey is in the hospital with a viral infection. Ricky is reluctant to listen to Brax, but he admits that he could not spend twenty years in prison and needed to get out to clear his name. He knew Ricky would not go along with his plan, but she and Casey were in danger. Ricky does not understand why he could not have told her instead of putting her through all the pain and grief. Brax replies that everything happened so quick, but Ricky retorts that he was only thinking of himself. Brax explains that he got the idea to disappear after failing to save a prison officer from being swept away by the river. He tried to find the man that set him up, before getting a job on a trawler. Ricky tells him that ever since she found out he was alive, she has hated him and nothing has changed.

Brax looks at the family photos and finds Ricky at the beach. She tells him that the day she learned he was dead, everything changed. She had suicidal thoughts and could not look at Casey. They return home, where Brax apologises and Ricky admits she actually felt relieved. She mentions how she set aside her career and life overseas for him, and he still left her. Brax counters that he did nothing but try to protect her and his family. He thinks Ricky's partner Nate has been speaking ill of him, but she tells him that Nate loves and respects her, which Brax did not always do. She reveals that she and Nate are engaged. Brax tells her that he still loves her and tries to kiss her, but she pulls away. Ricky demands to know why Brax is really back, pointing out that he faked his death so she could move on. Brax calls it the biggest mistake of his life, before asking her and Casey to run away with him. Ricky tells him that it is too late as she loves Nate. Brax wants to see Casey and Ricky tells him to return in the morning. She visits Casey in the hospital, while Brax returns to the beach and looks at a photo of Ricky and Casey.

== Production ==
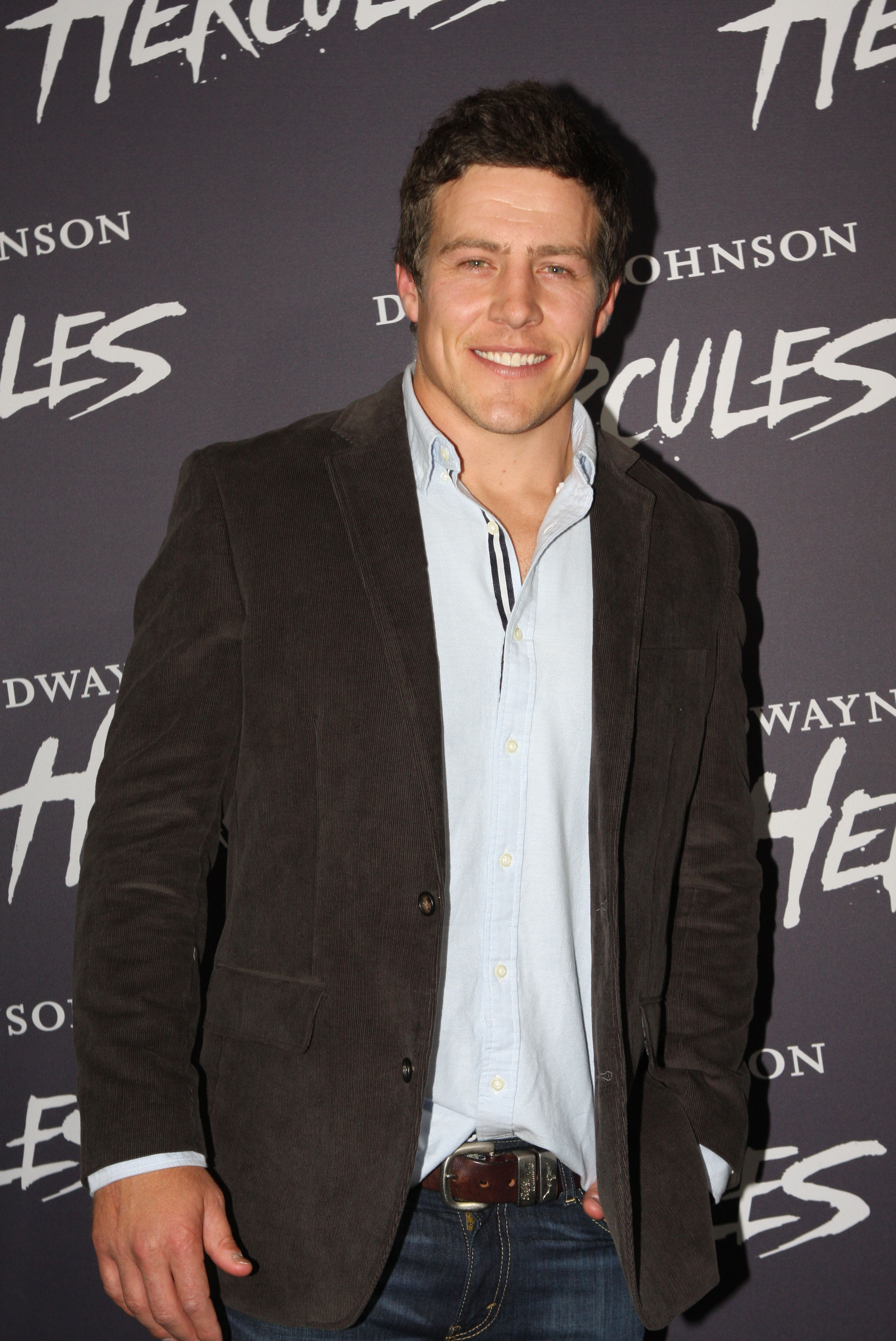
The episode features the return of Stephen Peacocke, who reprises his role after a six month absence.

Episode 6361 is a two-hander, featuring the characters of Darryl "Brax" Braxton and Ricky Sharpe, played by Stephen Peacocke and Bonnie Sveen. It is the first time in Home and Away's history that an entire episode has featured just two characters.

The episode also features the return of Peacocke to Home and Away. The actor quit the serial in late 2014 and his exit storyline, which saw his character faking his own death to avoid returning to prison, aired in June 2015. Brax's partner Ricky was left as a single mother to their infant son Casey, before she established a relationship with Nate Cooper (Kyle Pryor). Following Peacocke's departure, the show experienced "a ratings slump". Then in August 2015, Jonathon Moran of The Daily Telegraph reported that Peacocke had agreed to reprise his role for some "top-secret episodes". Peacocke told Moran that the producers had pitched him "a good story" and said Brax would "spice things up a bit, I think." He felt the viewers would love Brax's return storyline and he called it "a nice book end", before stressing that it would be the final appearance for him on the show. Peacocke later said that he agreed to reprise his role to show his gratitude to Home and Away for launching his career.

In an interview with Sue Yeap of The West Australian, Peacocke teased Brax's return storyline saying it would be "significant" and "something that has never been done on the show before". He reckoned there would be "some good stuff" for fans of his character, adding that the episode "has been really skilfully done and is what the audience will be interested to see." The two-hander episode was confirmed in early February, and Seven released a trailer to promote it. Sveen said it was "great" to work on the episode with Peacocke, and she told an Inside Soap reporter that filming the two-hander was the "absolute highlight of the year" for her. Although the episode is a two-hander for the most part, there is a brief appearance from Brax and Ricky's infant son, Casey (Phoenix Lumsden and Dante Trovato). Episode 6361 was billed as a "Valentine's Day themed episode", due to it airing on 15 February 2016. The episode's plot centres on Brax and Ricky's "love story", and explores the consequences of Brax's decision to fake his death, before Ricky is forced to choose between him and Nate. Peacocke said it would give fans of Brax and Ricky "closure" on their relationship.

In the lead up to the episode, Ricky learns that Brax is still alive. Despite this, Sveen said Ricky is in "absolute shock" when Brax emerges from her bathroom, adding that he was the last person she was expecting to see walk through the door. In addition to the shock, Sveen said Ricky also experiences a lot of anger towards Brax as he let her think that he was dead for six months and left her as a single mother to Casey. Brax "desperately" tries to explains his actions, claiming that he wanted to keep her and Casey safe. Of her character's reaction to this, Sveen told the Inside Soap reporter: "Ricky isn't having a bar of it. She believes that Brax should have let her in on his plan. She can't understand why he wouldn't trust her with this secret, rather than someone like Ash." As the characters continue to talk, Brax begs Ricky to forgive him and even tries to kiss her at one point. Sveen told the reporter that Ricky will always love Brax as they have been through so much, but she pulls away from the kiss because she is engaged to Nate, whom she believes is the "right man for her." Brax is "undeterred" in his attempts to win Ricky back and even begs her to go on the run with him. Sveen urged her character to "think with her head, not her heart", as she needed to do what is best for her and Casey.

== Reception ==
The original broadcast of Episode 6361 was watched by 946,000 viewers, making it the sixth most watched program on Australian television and fourth most watched program on the Seven Network for 15 February 2016.

Tiffany Dunk from the Herald Sun chose the episode as her "top pick" for the week and in her review, she stated "The most frustrating thing about a nightly soap is that just as you're getting into a storyline they cut to another one, leaving you hanging for the next episode. But not on tonight's special episode of Home and Away. The reunion of Brax (Stephen Peacocke) and Ricky (Bonnie Sveen) is the only story featured and for me it brought resolution for every question I had." Similarly, the episode was named as one of The Advertiser's Free-To-Air Highlights for 15 February 2016, with a writer commenting that it "may bring resolution for every question you have ever wanted answered." Holly Byrnes of news.com.au branded the episode "history-making" and "experimental", before writing that it resolved Brax and Ricky's "tortured storyline."

The episode was chosen as one of Inside Soap's "6 picks" for its UK airing on 4 April. A writer for the publication said: "Ricky looks like she's seen a ghost in today's Home and Away, when her supposedly dead boyfriend Brax steps out of her bathroom alive and well! It's a first for the Aussie soap as they dedicate an entire episode to just Brax and Ricky. But will she go on the run with her ex, or stick with Hunky Doctor Nate?" Alison Slade and Sally Brockway from TV Times quipped "Ricky's in need of a G and T as she comes to terms with Brax's 'resurrection', while he's on a mission to win her back." They observed that Ricky was "having none of it" when Brax insisted that he faked his death to protect her.

Digital Spy's Daniel Kilkelly called the moment Ricky and Brax came face to face again as "the moment that Home and Away fans have been waiting for". In 2018, Brax's return to Home and Away was named as one of the 12 best soap comebacks by Kilkelly's fellow Digital Spy contributor Laura Morgan, who went on to call Episode 6361 "a brilliant and highly-charged two-hander".
