= Casey Braxton =

- Home and Away character
- Portrayed by: Lincoln Younes
- Duration: 2011–2014
- First appearance: 17 February 2011
- Last appearance: 16 September 2014
- Introduced by: Cameron Welsh
In-universe information
- Occupation: Student at Summer Bay High; Pizza delivery boy Personal trainer Gym Owner
- Father: Johnny Barrett
- Mother: Cheryl Braxton
- Stepfather: Danny Braxton
- Half-brothers: Darryl Braxton; Heath Braxton; Josh Barrett
- Nephews: Rocco Scott-Braxton; Harley Braxton; Casey Braxton
- Nieces: Darcy Callahan

Casey Braxton is a fictional character from the Australian Channel Seven soap opera Home and Away, played by Lincoln Younes. Casey made his first on-screen appearance on 17 February 2011. Younes was about to go travelling when he auditioned for the role of Casey. He changed his plans upon winning the role. In late 2010 the Seven Network began airing trailers for a new trio of characters known as "The River Boys". The trio consist of Casey and his older half-brothers Darryl (Steve Peacocke) and Heath Braxton (Dan Ewing). The River Boys arrive in Summer Bay from neighbouring town Mangrove River. Casey is characterised as being a "modern day Rebel Without a Cause"; who is intelligent and unsure about what he wants out of life. Younes has described him as the "epitome of teenage angst". The River Boys cause trouble in Summer Bay and producers were inspired by Koby Abberton's Bra Boys in the creation process. Casey is portrayed as wanting to distance himself from their bad reputation; but his anger issues often mar his attempts.

Casey is the first of the Braxton brothers to build friendships with established characters. He also begins a relationship with Ruby Buckton (Rebecca Breeds). Younes was later required for filming of the television series Tangle; producers then devised an exit storyline to accommodate his temporary departure. The storyline consists of Casey succumbing to the bad reputation of the River Boys when he commits an arson attack against an adversary of the Braxton's. Casey was sentenced to time in juvenile detention and was given early release upon his return to the series. Casey and the rest of the River Boys have been well received by viewers. Critics also welcomed their inclusion in the series. Series producer Lucy Addario said that the response from fans had been "utterly overwhelming". However, Bree Hoskin of Gaydar Radio felt that Casey has been overshadowed by his brothers and a poll run by Inside Soap indicated that Casey was not as popular as Darryl. Younes announced his intentions to leave Home and Away in March 2014 and Casey made his final appearance on 16 September 2014.

== Creation and casting ==
In 2010, Network Seven began running teaser trailers for a new trio of characters known as The River Boys. Said to be a "bad-boy surf gang with dodgy reputations", The River Boys consist of three brothers – Darryl, Casey and Heath. Kristy Kelly of Digital Spy reported Koby Abberton's Bra Boys were the inspiration for The River Boys. The Braxton brothers made their on screen debuts in February 2011.

Younes had been starring in the television series Tangle; after which he felt depressed and received no auditions. He then planned to leave Australia, when the offer of five auditions came through, one of which was for Home and Away. After a successful audition for the serial, he decided to cancel his plans to play the part of Casey. Younes told the Bendigo Weekly that he was standing outside the travel agent when he received the call and he spent three days thinking about whether to accept the role. He has moved to Sydney to work on Home and Away. In comparison to his role on Tangle, Younes felt Home and Away offered a longer period of time to unravel a character.

== Character development ==
=== Characterisation ===
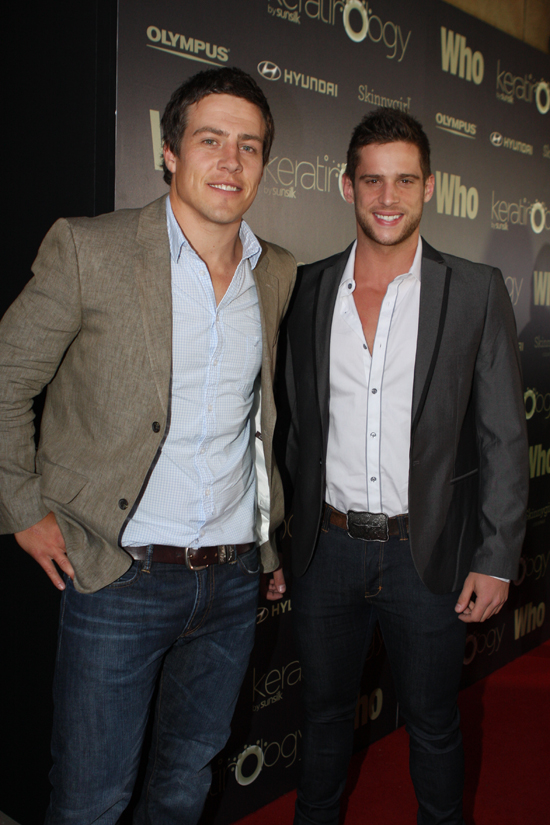
Steve Peacocke and Dan Ewing (pictured left to right) play Brax and Heath, who create a bad reputation for the Braxtons.

Baby-faced Braxton brother Casey has grown up as something of an outsider: at home he's overshadowed by his older brothers, surfing legend Brax and bad boy Heath; at school he's floundered academically and socially, at best facing trouble with the teachers and, at worst, expulsion from Reefton Lakes High. Dig a little deeper, though, and Casey is an intelligent teen who, although uncertain about what he does want from life, is in no doubt about what he doesn't.

— Channel 5 on Casey.

Casey is the youngest of the Braxton brothers. The Daily Telegraph said that Casey is trying to break out of the River Boys mould and that he was kicked out of his last high school. Casey is described as being a "modern day Rebel Without a Cause." He has never quite fitted in and he does not know what he wants from life. He has been overshadowed by both of his brothers and he has struggled at school. He was expelled from Reefton Lakes High for disruptive behaviour. However, Casey is intelligent and has resisted becoming a typical River Boy, instead he is a loner. Channel Seven said "When Casey eventually makes friends at Summer Bay High his true personality shines through, revealing a courageous, sensitive, mischievous guy, with a sly, laconic wit. However, acceptance at Summer Bay can be seen as betrayal in Mangrove River, putting Casey in conflict with some of his brother's River Boy mates." Casey's mother leaves him to his own devices and he misinterprets that as disapproval from her. Holy Soap questioned whether a new life Summer Bay could be Casey's chance to turn his life around.

Younes told Melinda Houston of The Age that Casey has come from the "wrong side of the tracks". Casey wants to "establish himself on the straight and narrow", while his brothers show little interest in following his example. Casey finds it hard to shake off the Braxtons' bad reputation and distance himself from his brothers. Although; Younes has opined that Casey does try to "break out of the mould set by his older brothers". Casey is a mixed up young man; Younes said that portraying Casey's confusion "screwed" with his head because he had previously been in a similar situation. Casey was the first of the Braxton brothers to befriend some of the locals of Summer Bay. He forges friendships with Ruby Buckton (Rebecca Breeds), Xavier Austin (David Jones-Roberts) and Dexter Walker (Charles Cottier). Casey is also the first to display "softer emotions"; which often surface when he shares scenes with Ruby, who becomes Casey's love interest. Younes told a reporter from Channel 5 that Casey is not a "bad boy" role. Younes was attracted to the part of Casey because he is "a product of his two older brothers and their clashing personalities". He has both sensitive and volatile sides to his persona. Younes explained that as the "epitome of teenage angst", Casey does not have any idea of who he is. He does not know how to act around others and can be impressionable. Casey also has deep rooted issues with his anger; Younes said that he empathised with the way Casey feels due to his previous experiences.

=== Relationship with Ruby Buckton ===
In January 2011, Breeds told Debbie Schipp of The Advertiser that the River Boys added a new dynamic to the series. She revealed that Ruby would soon end up in a "love-hate relationship" with Casey. In February 2011, Younes told Alicia McCumstie of the Central Coast Express Advocate that Casey would get "more action" on the female front. It was also announced that Casey was to have a fling with Ruby, after her romance with Romeo Smith (Luke Mitchell) ends. When Ruby realises that Romeo is back with his girlfriend, she sleeps with Casey. He then takes "great pleasure" in revealing the details about Ruby's relationship with Romeo. When the pair begin a relationship, Ruby's mother Charlie Buckton (Esther Anderson) does not approve. Anderson told TV Week that Charlie thinks Ruby is getting into a new relationship "too quickly". Brax offers Charlie parenting advice about Ruby's relationships; Anderson said that Charlie listens to the advice yet refuses to admit that Brax is correct.

=== Arson and temporary departure ===
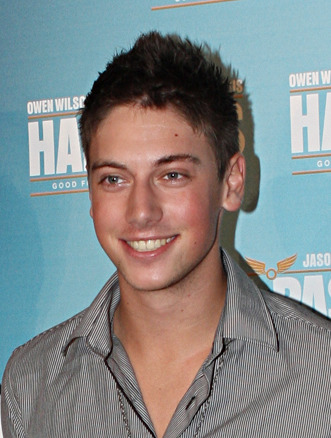
Lincoln Younes (pictured) left Home and Away temporarily to film for the television series Tangle.

In August 2011, it was announced that Younes would temporarily leave Home and Away; while he returned to film his part in the television series Tangle. Ewing revealed that the serial had developed a storyline to compensate Younes' departure. His exit storyline begins after the Braxton's feud with the Pivoric family heightens. Casey goes to Jake Pirovic's (Fletcher Humphrys) headquarters and sets fire to the building. Younes told TV Week that Casey commits arson to stop tension between the two gangs, but just makes the situation worse. Casey realises the ramifications of his actions and acknowledges that he did not want to turn out like his siblings. Younes said that Casey's "whole demeanour and mood changed because he knows what he's done". Casey "established himself as a River Boy" through his act, Younes opined that it "goes against everything he's been fighting for, as he's always tried not to be a River Boy."

As a consequence, Casey's relationship with Ruby is tested. Ruby betrays her mother and informs Casey that the police know that he committed the crime. Younes said that it "stretched their relationship quite a bit" because he places a lot of responsibility on Ruby; who has to keep his secret. Casey acts "unfairly" because he does not know what to do about the situation either. Heath tries to convince him to run from the law. Younes told Inside Soap that "Brax is afraid for Casey" because he knows the police will use the long arm of the law when they catch him. Brax makes Casey realise that he should hand himself over to the police. Younes observed Casey to be the most "emotional and volatile" of the Braxton brothers, adding that Casey "breaking down" is a rarity. So when Casey breaks down in front of Brax, it becomes clear that Casey is remorseful for his actions. Brax realises that Casey is "in too deep" and feels "scared" for his future. When Casey hands himself in to the police it changes his attitude. He remains afraid but loses his emotions and feelings near to the point of becoming stoical. Casey then pushes Ruby away; Younes explained that Casey thinks he is doing it for her own good because he does not want to "drag her down with him". Ruby does not understand Casey's actions, but he realises it will add to the "strain" on her when he is sent to jail.

Casey is sentenced to thirty days in juvenile detention. Peacocke told TV Week that "Brax is disappointed that it's got to this because, he has always wanted to keep Casey out of trouble." He said that Casey is not like Brax or Heath and because juvenile detention is "dangerous" he would not cope as well as they would. Younes confirmed that Casey's time in jail would not go well and viewers would see a "darker more wary Casey" upon his return. Ewing also said the storyline would "harden Casey up" and not return as the "same teenager" that departs.

=== Car accident ===
Casey is accompanied to Bianca and Heath's wedding party with new friend Maddy Osborne (Kassandra Clementi). She meets Josh Barrett (Jackson Gallagher) and flirts with him. Maddy's foster mother Roo Stewart (Georgie Parker) attempts to convince a reluctant Maddy to leave the party so Casey agrees to look after her. She defies Casey by sneaking off with Josh. Younes told a reporter from TV Week that Casey is unhappy with Maddy's actions and believes she should not lose her virginity because she wants to rebel. When Casey drags Maddy away from Josh a fight ensues and they drive off. However Josh and his brother Andy Barrett (Tai Hara) start a car chase. Younes explained that Maddy is making amends for her behaviour towards Casey when a four-wheel-drive hits them and sends the car careering off the road. The actors explained that "Maddy is unconscious and the car is burning so he has to act very quickly, he's really hurt but manages to carry Maddy out of the car before it explodes." The car then explodes and the impact knocks the duo to the ground. They are not thought to be missing and spend the night injured on the road side until Maddy manages to get help. Home and Away invested in big stunt scenes for the storyline. Younes revealed that he filmed his own stunts carrying Clementi when the explosion was carried out and he dived to the ground. The car chase scenes were filmed at night on location down a narrow road. Younes described the shoot as a "scary" scenario.

The accident leaves Casey with life changing injuries and reliant on a wheelchair. The storyline sees him struggle to accept his situation and struggle to recover. Tamara tries to support Casey through his recovery despite his reluctance to use his wheel chair or attend physical therapy. Younes told Gavin Scott (TV Week) that Casey feels "completely deected and depressed, because Casey is such an active person, to come to terms with the fact he might not be able to be active again is incredibly hard. For him, as soon as he gets into that wheel chair it's giving up." Younes did not enjoy using the wheel chair and found it "horrible" because of the emotional impact. When he researched the storyline many of the stories he encountered upset him.

=== Departure and death ===
Younes confirmed that 2014 would be his last year with Home and Away in the 22–28 March 2014 issue of TV Week. He explained that he did not see himself going beyond 2014 and was looking forward to going to Los Angeles to find new roles. Younes was not aware of what Casey's exit storyline would be, but hoped it would not be dull. Younes filmed his final scenes in May 2014. Casey departed on 16 September, after he was shot dead by Jake Pirovic while trying to save his kidnapped half-brother Josh Barrett (Jackson Gallagher). Channel Seven's head of drama Julie McGauran noted that the Braxton brothers "lived a life of crime" and there had to be consequences, so Casey had to be the one to pay the price. Younes was pleased with Casey's exit storyline and said "It made sense out of the three brothers that Casey was the one it would happen to. It was nice to see him, for a moment in time, turn into Brax and what Brax had taught him and that was to put family first. He died trying to protect him after Brax had spent his life protecting Casey...it was nice to see that switch."

== Storylines ==
Casey arrives in Summer Bay with his brothers Darryl, known as "Brax", and Heath, as their gang, the River Boys, are extending their turf beyond Mangrove River. Casey befriends Romeo Smith (Luke Mitchell), who becomes concerned about Casey's attitude situation. When Romeo goes to Casey's house, as he needs assistance with his school work, he realises that Casey has a bad home life. His alcoholic mother Cheryl Braxton (Suzi Dougherty) shows little interest in him and his older brothers Heath and Brax continuously put him down. Casey has a one-night stand with Ruby Buckton (Rebecca Breeds), who is attempting to move on from her ex Romeo. Casey furiously attacks Romeo when he discovers that he treated her poorly and ends their friendship. Casey and Ruby's attraction leads to a romantic relationship, but their future is put into question when they have to overcome disapproval from Ruby's police sergeant mother, Charlie, who cannot accept the fact he is a River Boy.

Casey gets a job at Angelo's delivering pizza. He and Ruby organise a party at the home of one of his customers. Heath and the other River Boys gate crash the party, causing the police to break it up. Casey struggles with his school work and Miles Copeland (Josh Quong Tart) suspects that he may be dyslexic. Cheryl is angry at the school's recommendation that he gets tested. Miles decides to mentor Casey to help him through the HSC. Casey feels pressured by Cheryl to leave school, especially when she gets him a job at the fishery. Casey quits school, angering Brax, who feels Casey is throwing his bright future away. Brax endeavours to persuade Casey to return to school. When he does, Cheryl throws him out of the house and Brax hires a motel room for him to live in. Brax realises that the set-up is not practical, so he convinces Roo Stewart (Georgie Parker) to let him live at her flat with Romeo and Indigo Walker (Samara Weaving).

Casey lets Tegan Callahan (Saskia Burmeister) hide money belonging to rival gang member Jake Pirovic at his place. Jake kidnaps Casey and Ruby and when Brax turns up to rescue them, he is stabbed. Jake is arrested and sent to jail and his brother Hammer (Benedict Samuel) sets out to gain revenge on the Braxtons. Casey brings a knife into school in order to protect himself, just in case he is attacked and Miles sees it. Gina Austin (Sonia Todd) then excludes Casey. She later gives him a second chance so he can concentrate on the HSC. Shortly after, Casey dumps Ruby when he becomes annoyed at her constantly nagging him about the HSC. Casey is frustrated at being unable to help his older brothers in the fight with Hammer's gang. Casey decides against attending Tegan's funeral and he goes to Jake's place and sets it on fire. As everyone is at the funeral, no one is injured and the fire is put out. Brax learns Casey started the fire and while angry, he helps him cover his tracks. Georgina Watson (Jaclyn Albergoni) suspects Casey is behind the arson attack and questions him over the incident. The police later find CCTV evidence placing him in the area minutes before and after the fire. Heath tries to convince Casey to run away, but he hands himself in. Casey continues to push Ruby away to protect her. When he assumes she is flirting with Xavier Austin (David Jones-Roberts), they resume dating and she agrees to wait for him. On the day of Casey's court case, Magistrate Hanson (Rhett Walton) decides to make an example of Casey and sends him to jail for thirty days. Casey is later given early release and surprises Ruby by accompanying her to the school formal. He then comforts Ruby and Brax after Charlie is murdered by Jake. Following Charlie's death, Ruby pushes Casey away then dumps him for good.

Heath's ex-girlfriend, Henrietta Brown (Emma Leonard), begins teaching at the high school and she becomes Casey's tutor. Casey develops a crush on her and they later share a kiss. Casey and Henri begin a secret relationship, but when Heath finds out, he publicly outs the affair to Gina. Henri ends the relationship and leaves the Bay. Sasha Bezmel (Demi Harman) supports Casey when he is bullied by a teacher and she later confesses her feelings for him, but Casey reveals he does not feel the same way. Casey meets his father, Danny (Andy McPhee), and decides to forge a relationship with him. However, he later admits to Brax that he is spending time with Danny, so he can stop him from targeting Ruby and her money. Danny involves Casey in his plan to rob a pub. When Danny tells Casey to shoot the owner, he refuses and shoots Danny instead and he dies. Casey struggles to cope with what he has done and he later goes out to the forest with Sasha, where he has sex with her. He later dismisses their night together, upsetting Sasha. Casey is kidnapped by his half-brother, Kyle Bennett (Nic Westaway) who wants to avenge their father's death and is taken to the desert and deprived of food and water. Kyle forces Casey to make a goodbye call to Brax unaware that Casey gives Brax hints to his location before Kyle leaves him to die of thirst and hunger. Tamara Kingsley (Kelly Paterniti) finds Casey and gives him water. Kyle soon returns after learning of Brax searching for Casey and forces both he and Tamara into his truck. Casey distracts Kyle long enough for Tamara to escape. She seriously injures Kyle after throwing a lit petrol container at him, which alerts Brax to Casey's location. He and Natalie Davison (Catherine Mack) rescue Casey and take him home. Tamara turns up in the Bay for Casey's court case. Casey develops feelings for her and they begin dating. Casey is wrongfully arrested for a robbery that he did not commit. Ricky Sharpe (Bonnie Sveen) later confesses to framing Casey on the orders of her brother, Adam (Martin Lynes). On his release from prison, Casey refuses to forgive Ricky which causes a strain in his relationship with Brax when he starts a relationship with Ricky. After Tamara is kidnapped by Adam, the trauma causes her to lose her memories of her time in the Bay. Casey tries to get her to remember him and he is devastated when she begins a relationship with Kyle. Having a difficult time coping with losing Tamara, Casey starts drinking heavily and isolates himself from his friends and family. After a night of partying with Maddy Osborne (Kassandra Clementi), Casey suffers from alcohol poisoning and is rushed to the hospital but later recovers. Whilst driving her home from Heath and Bianca Scott's (Lisa Gormley) beach party wedding reception, Casey and Maddy are run off the road by Josh (Jackson Gallagher) and Andy Barrett (Tai Hara) and he sustains a spinal injury. Casey has difficulty coping with the news that he may be reliant on a wheelchair for the rest of his life. Brax and Heath are furious upon finding out the truth but are stopped by Bianca and Maddy from taking revenge against the Barretts. A depressed Casey refuses to get out of bed to try his wheelchair or go for physiotherapy. After much persuasion from Tamara and Dexter Walker (Charles Cottier) he begins his recovery and takes his first steps.

While recovering, Casey and Tamara rekindle their relationship and Tamara breaks up with Kyle. Torn between his love for Tamara and loyalty to his brother, Kyle chooses to let Tamara go, but Casey later breaks up with Tamara, believing their relationship is no longer right. Casey supports his brothers through tough times and has a brief fling with a girl called Linda Somerset (Hannah Britland) when the brothers visit London together. Back in the bay, Casey struggles when Brax reveals that he is in fact the son of Johnny Barrett; making him Josh Barrett's half-brother, and meaning that Kyle is unrelated to him. He feels betrayed that Brax kept this from him for several months, but eventually comes to accept it with the help of Denny Miller (Jessica Grace Smith). Casey helps Tamara when she is hit by a car and her eyesight is affected due a bleed in her brain, and eventually convinces her to leave Summer Bay to get treatment near where her parents live. Denny's boyfriend Chris Harrington (Johnny Ruffo) becomes jealous and punches Casey when he believes he has feelings for Denny; afterwards, Casey and Denny briefly end their friendship before realising their feelings for each other and begin dating after Denny breaks up with Chris. Casey realises Andy is dealing drugs for Jake, who has escaped from prison where he had been serving his sentence for Charlie's murder, and tries to stop him; the situation escalates further when Brax discovers Andy's actions and Jake holds Josh hostage. Casey rushes to Josh's aid and is shot by Jake, saving Josh's life. Casey then dies in Brax's arms. In 2015, Ricky gave birth to her and Brax's son and they named their son after Casey in his honour.

== Reception ==
For his portrayal of Casey, Younes won Best Daytime Star at the 2014 Inside Soap Awards. A columnist for the Sunday Mail said that Casey was the "baby of the family" and wondered whether he was "bad to the core or just misunderstood". In March 2011, Inside Soap asked their readers to decide which of the Braxton brothers they liked the most. Brax was deemed the most liked, while Casey and Heath both received twenty-eight percent of the vote each. Bree Hoskin of Gaydar Radio said that Casey is overshadowed by his brothers and struggles to fit in. She added that there is "definitely a soft centre underneath Casey's hard, buff exterior".

The River Boys have proved popular with viewers. Claire Crick of All About Soap said the publications staff were content with the River Boy's arriving in Summer Bay. They added that the only thing they like more than "a new bad boy" is "three arriving at the same time and especially when they are this hot." In the Inside Soap Yearbook 2012, the arrival of the River Boys was included in their "best bits" of March 2011. Their reporter noted that while residents of Summer Bay were not happy about them moving to the area – viewers were "aquiver" at the prospect. Overseas broadcaster Channel 5 aired a special series titled "Top 20 Aussie Soap Moments of 2011". The programme's content was generated via public to determine the best moments in Australian soaps in 2011. The River Boy's arrival in the series was voted the fourth best moment of that year. With their fictional counterparts rise in popularity, came false Facebook accounts were made in the actor names. Fans also bombarded their real accounts on the social networking site with friend requests. While interviewed by Jason Herbison of Inside Soap, series producer Lucy Addario said that the response from fans, concerning the River Boys had been "utterly overwhelming". She added that their inclusion meant the series could "explore many different storylines and play out lots of great plots."
