= 2011 AACTA Television Awards =

The categories for television, at the Inaugural Australian Academy of Cinema and Television Arts Awards, known commonly as the AACTA Awards, were presented by the Australian Academy of Cinema and Television Arts (AACTA). The awards were presented with the film awards on two separate events: the AACTA Awards Luncheon, on 15 January 2012, at the Westin Hotel, and the AACTA Awards Ceremony, on 31 January 2012, at the Sydney Opera House. Public voted awards were also presented for Best Television Series, Best Actor and Best Actress.

== Nominees ==
Winners will be listed first and highlighted in boldface.

=== Academy voted awards ===
Best Drama Series	Best Comedy Series
**East West 101 (Season 3) – Steve Knapman and Kris Wyld (SBS)**; Offspring (Season 2) – John Edwards and Imogen Banks (Network Ten); Rake – Ian Collie, Peter Duncan and Richard Roxburgh (ABC1); Spirited (Season 2) – Claudia Karvan and Jacquelin Perske (W)	At Home With Julia – Rick Kalowski, Greg Quail and Carol Hughes (ABC1); Laid – Liz Watts (ABC1); Twentysomething – Nicole Minchin (ABC2)
Best Telefeature, Mini Series or Short Run Series	Best Light Entertainment Series
**The Slap – Tony Ayres, Helen Bowden, Michael McMahon (ABC1)**; Cloudstreet – Greg Haddrick and Brenda Pam (Showcase); Paper Giants: The Birth of Cleo – John Edwards and Karen Radzyner (ABC1); Sisters of War – Andrew Wiseman (ABC1)	**The Gruen Transfer (Series 4) – Andrew Denton, Anita Jacoby and Jon Casimir (ABC1)**; Hungry Beast (Season 3) – Andrew Denton, Anita Jacoby, Andy Nehl and Jon Casimir (ABC1); Judith Lucy's Spiritual Journey – Todd Abbott (ABC1); Junior MasterChef (Season 1) – Tara McWilliams (Network Ten); RocKwiz – Brian Nankervis, Ken Connor, Peter Bain-Hogg and Joe Connor (SBS)
Best Children's Television Series	Best Comedy Performance
A gURLs wURLd – Noel Price (Nine Network); Gasp! – Suzanne Ryan (Nine Network); H_{2}O: Just Add Water (Season 3) – Jonathan M. Shiff (Network Ten); My Place (Season 2) – Penny Chapman (ABC3)	Alison Bell – Laid as Roo McVie (ABC1); Jess Harris – Twentysomething as Jess (ABC2); **Chris Lilley – Angry Boys as Daniel and Nathan Sims, S.mouse, Jen Okazaki,** **Gran and Blake Oakfield (ABC1)**; Celia Pacquola – Laid as EJ (ABC1)
Best Lead Actor – Drama	Best Lead Actress – Drama
**Alex Dimitriades – The Slap as Harry (ABC1)**; Rob Carlton – Paper Giants: The Birth of Cleo as Kerry Packer (ABC1); Don Hany – East West 101 as Detective Zane Malik (SBS); Jonathan LaPaglia – The Slap as Hector (ABC1)	**Sarah Snook – Sisters of War as Lorna Whyte (ABC1)**; Essie Davis – Cloudstreet as Dolly Pickles (Showcase); Kerry Fox – Cloudstreet as Oriel Lamb (Showcase); Asher Keddie – Paper Giants: The Birth of Cleo as Ita Buttrose (ABC1)
Best Guest or Supporting Actor – Drama	Best Guest or Supporting Actress – Drama
**Richard Cawthorne – Killing Time as Dennis Allen (TV1)**; Aaron Fa'aoso – East West 101 as Detective Sonny Koa (SBS); Jacek Koman – Spirited as Potter The Man (W); Todd Lasance – Cloudstreet as Quick Lamb (Showcase)	**Diana Glenn – The Slap as Sandi (ABC1)**; Rena Owen – East West 101 as Mere Hahunga (SBS); Susie Porter – Sisters of War as Kay Parker (ABC1); Lara Robinson – Cloudstreet as Young Rose Pickles (Showcase)
Best Direction	Best Screenplay
**Matthew Saville – The Slap for Episode 3: "Harry" (ABC1)**; Daina Reid – Paper Giants: The Birth of Cleo for "Episode 1" (ABC1); Jessica Hobbs – The Slap for Episode 1: "Hector" (ABC1); Jeffrey Walker – Small Time Gangster for Episode 1: "Jingle Bells" (Movie Extra)	**The Slap – Brendan Cowell for Episode 3: "Harry" (ABC1)**; Cloudstreet – Tim Winton and Ellen Fontana for "Part 3" (Showcase); Laid – Kirsty Fisher for "Episode 3" (ABC1); The Slap – Kris Mrksa for Episode 1: "Hector" (ABC1)
Best Documentary Under One Hour
The Ball – Yael Bergman, Laura Waters and Jessica Leski; Jandamarra's War – Andrew Ogilvie, Andrea Quesnelle and Eileen Torres; Leaky Boat – Penny Chapman; Orchids: My Intersex Adventure – Phoebe Hart

=== Public voted awards ===
Best Television Program	Best Performance – Male
**Packed to the Rafters (Seven Network)**; Australia's Got Talent (Seven Network); Underbelly: Razor (Nine Network); Dancing with the Stars (Seven Network); MasterChef Australia (Network Ten); My Kitchen Rules (Seven Network); The X Factor (Seven Network); Winners & Losers (Seven Network); The Block (Nine Network); Paper Giants: The Birth of Cleo (ABC1)	Steve Peacocke – Home and Away as Darryl Braxton (Seven Network); Matthew Le Nevez – Offspring as Patrick Reed (Network Ten); Erik Thomson – Packed to the Rafters as David Rafter (Seven Network); Rob Carlton – Paper Giants: The Birth of Cleo as Kerry Packer (ABC1); Les Hill – Rescue: Special Ops as Dean Gallagher (Nine Network); Ian Stenlake – Sea Patrol as Mike Flynn (Nine Network); Lex Marinos – The Slap as Manolis (ABC1); Jeremy Lindsay Taylor – Underbelly: Razor as Norman Bruhn (Nine Network); Daniel MacPherson – Wild Boys as Jack Keenan (Seven Network); Tom Wren – Winners & Losers as Doug Graham
Best Performance – Female
**Asher Keddie – Paper Giants: The Birth of Cleo as Ita Buttrose (ABC1)**; Samara Weaving – Home and Away as Indigo Walker (Seven Network); Asher Keddie – Offspring as Nina Proudman (Network Ten); Rebecca Gibney – Packed to the Rafters as Julie Rafter (Seven Network); Gigi Edgley – Rescue: Special Ops as Lara Knight (Nine Network); Lisa McCune – Sea Patrol as Kate McGregor (Nine Network)

== See also ==
- 2011 AACTA Film Awards
- Logie Awards of 2012
- AACTA Awards
- 2011 in Australian television
