= Heath Braxton =

- Home and Away character
- Portrayed by: Dan Ewing
- Duration: 2011–2014, 2016–2017, 2021
- First appearance: 16 February 2011
- Last appearance: 3 February 2021
- Introduced by: Cameron Welsh (2011); Lucy Addario (2016, 2021)
- Book appearances: Home and Away: An Eye for an Eye
- Spin-off appearances: Home and Away: An Eye for an Eye (2015); Home and Away: Revenge (2016); Home and Away: All or Nothing (2017)
In-universe information
- Occupation: Waiter; Personal trainer
- Father: Danny Braxton
- Mother: Cheryl Braxton
- Brothers: Darryl Braxton
- Half-brothers: Kyle Braxton; Casey Braxton
- Wife: Bianca Scott (2013–)
- Sons: Rocco Scott-Braxton; Harley Braxton
- Daughters: Darcy Callahan
- Nephews: Casey Braxton

Heath Braxton is a fictional character from the Australian Channel Seven soap opera Home and Away, played by Dan Ewing. He made his first screen appearance during the episode broadcast on 16 February 2011. Ewing confirmed his departure in December 2013 and Heath made his on-screen exit on 29 July 2014, but made a brief appearance on 23 September 2014 for his brother Casey Braxton's (Lincoln Younes) funeral. Heath and his wife Bianca Scott (Lisa Gormley) made a return in 2016 and departed on 3 February 2017. Ewing reprised the role for one episode on 3 February 2021.

== Creation and casting ==
In late 2010, Network Seven began running teaser trailers for a new trio of characters "The River Boys". Said to be a "bad-boy surf gang with dodgy reputations", The River Boys consist of three brothers – Heath, Darryl Braxton (Steve Peacocke) and Casey (Lincoln Younes). Koby Abberton's Bra Boys were the inspiration for The River Boys. Heath made his on-screen debut in February 2011.

Heath was the first of The River Boys to be announced, with Ewing's casting revealed on 24 September 2010. Heath is Ewing's second role with Home and Away, having appeared as Reuben Humphries in 2007. For his role, Ewing had to get fit and he joked, "I don't think they would cast overweight guys to play surfers, so yeah, I'm sure it was a factor for the producers." He added that he cannot surf well and was relieved that the producers did not test his surfing skills at his audition. Initially, Ewing was employed as a member of the guest cast. He told Daniel Kilkelly of Digital Spy that Heath was originally planned to be a part of the series for six months, but revealed that he had since joined the regular cast.

== Development ==
=== Characterisation ===
There's no messing with Heath Braxton. Famed for his short fuse, hot temper and powerful left hook, police, Mangrove River locals and even his fellow surfers would do well to keep their distance. Brawn over brain, action man Heath is quick to let his fists do the talking, and has earned himself a reputation with gang members and cops alike. He's proud of and loyal to his River Boy connection, valuing the respect that comes with being a member; for him there's no stronger bond.

— Channel 5 on Heath.

Heath is the second oldest of the Braxton brothers and was initially described as being "feared by cops and the residents of his home town of Mangrove River" and having a short fuse. The character of Heath is described as "Mad, bad and dangerous to know." Out of The River Boys, Heath is the most volatile and he is feared by everyone from the police to the Mangrove River residents. Darryl is the only person Heath listens to and he follows his guidance. Channel Seven say Heath "loves the camaraderie and sense of family, not to mention the respect that comes with being a member. It's a privilege to be a River Boy and the worst thing anyone could do ever do is be one and then betray the group." Heath does not back down over anything and he feels that the River Boys are always being blamed for things they have not done. Heath was ten when his father left and his mother loves him "extravagantly, but has a volatile relationship with him." Heath has always found his younger brother, Casey (Lincoln Younes), weird for his love of reading.

Ewing said that Heath is "there to stir things up – a human hand grenade as they say. I’m there for trouble-making purposes." Ewing told Digital Spy that Heath does have a soft side and he promised that viewers will see Heath start to change and more vulnerable aspects to his personality will come out. Of this change, he said "I think even the toughest guys in the Bay have a soft side. It's actually very interesting to watch it unfold and I love finding out why these guys have become who they are." Ewing added that he shares some similarities to his character, they both like to party and stay in shape. Younes told Holy Soap that in comparison to his character Casey - Heath "shows hints of sensitivity or insecurity at a slower pace, and these are usually revealed around crises."

=== Departure ===
On 9 December 2013, Ewing confirmed that he would be leaving Home and Away. Rumours about Ewing's exit began when it was announced that he had signed up with a US talent management company. Of his decision to leave, Ewing said "I will say I do go, but I am not sure about the exact date yet. It will be fun – and scary." In February 2014, Ewing told Jenny Brown from New Idea that he would be filming until early March. He said that while he loved working on the show, he felt that it was easy to "get in the groove and suddenly 10 years have passed..." Ewing also believed that he had accomplished all he wanted to with Home and Away. He added that it felt right to leave just as his contract came up and he had signed with the US management company. Heath departed in July 2014.

=== Returns ===
Ewing later reprised the role for the feature length spin-off called Home and Away: An Eye for an Eye broadcast in late 2015. He told Shannon Molloy of news.com.au that he was open to a return to Home and Away if the storyline was right for him. He said, "I wouldn't want to play the same old Heath for another three years though – I'd want it to be fresh and him to have evolved." In June 2016, it was announced that Ewing had agreed to reprise the role, alongside Gormley as Bianca, for a short guest stint to be broadcast later in the year. Ewing called the couple's return storyline "a great, fun opportunity".

In early August 2020, Erin Doyle of New Idea reported that Ewing could be returning to Home and Away, after he was pictured alongside actors Ethan Browne and Rob Kipa-Williams, who play Tane Parata and Ari Parata, at an outdoor filming location. Ewing's return was later confirmed as he was pictured filming scenes alongside Browne, Kipa-Williams and Patrick O'Connor (Dean Thompson) in Riverstone while dressed in Heath's clothing. His scenes will air in early 2021. In January 2021, Ewing said Heath would not be back for long, but "he's certainly there for a good time." He called his return "a great opportunity", but he admitted that he had to learn and understand the events that Heath has been involved in off-screen from the other cast members. The show's executive producer Lucy Addario later confirmed that Heath was only back for a cameo appearance. The character's scenes aired on 3 February 2021, as he and the River Boys come to the aid of the Parata family.

== Storylines ==
Heath arrives in Summer Bay along with his brothers; Darryl and Casey. Heath earns a reputation as a troublemaker and he harasses Colleen Smart (Lyn Collingwood) in the Diner. When Heath notices Dexter Walker (Charles Cottier) filming him and friends, he puts him in the boot of his car and dumps him in the bush. Heath causes a lot of trouble with the police for dealing drugs and loitering on the beach. He makes an enemy out of local policewoman Charlie Buckton (Esther Anderson) and is unimpressed when Brax starts dating her. Heath develops an interest in Bianca Scott (Lisa Gormley) and they have sex, even though Bianca is dating Liam Murphy (Axle Whitehead). Bianca tells Heath that it was a mistake. Heath learns that he has a daughter, Darcy (Alea O'Shea), and starts to bond with her. When Bianca is raped at a party, Heath becomes the prime suspect. However, he is later cleared. Heath stops a man from harassing Bianca and her friends, and she starts to respect him. Bianca and Heath have sex again. On the way home from a trip, Charlie and Brax crash into Liam. Bianca realises that she still loves Liam and ends her relationship with Heath. Heath begins dating Bianca's younger sister, April (Rhiannon Fish). Bianca gets angry at Heath and warns him to stay away from April. Heath cheats on April with Henrietta Brown (Emma Leonard) and she breaks up with him.

Bianca marries Liam and finds out that she is pregnant. She initially tells Heath that the baby cannot be his, but later discovers her pregnancy is too far along for the baby to be Liam's. April tells Heath that he is the father and he is furious with Bianca and Liam for not telling him. When he learns that the couple are planning to leave the Bay, Heath hires Hayley O'Connor (Alyssa McClelland) to help him get joint custody. Liam and Bianca split up and Heath drops the court case. Heath goes to visit his father, Danny (Andy McPhee), in prison and decides to help get him released. Bianca develops pre-eclampsia and tells Heath that if anything happens, he must tell the doctors to save the baby. Bianca gives birth prematurely to a boy. She develops postnatal psychosis and thinks her baby is dead. Heath supports Bianca and visits their son. Bianca eventually recovers and she and Heath name their son Rocco. Heath and Bianca start dating again. Heath becomes angry with Casey when he shoots their father dead and refuses to talk to him for a while. Bianca comes to stay with Heath and briefly clashes with his mother. Rocco dies from Sudden Infant Death Syndrome, devastating Heath. Bianca pulls away from him and he later breaks down in front of Brax. Bianca asks Heath to restrict the funeral to family only and they say goodbye to their son. Heath later places a wreath in the ocean and joins the River Boys for an all night memorial at the beach.

Heath proposes to Bianca and she accepts. During a trip to Melbourne for his stag party, Heath has a one-night stand with Jess Lockwood (Georgia Chara). During his wedding, Heath confesses to Bianca and she punches him. Heath decides to leave the Bay, but Bianca stops him. Heath and Bianca get married. When Jade Montgomery (Tasma Walton) comes to the Bay after Mangrove River High is burnt down, she tries to frame Heath with an assault claim, but is thwarted by Tamara Kingsley (Kelly Paterniti). While Heath is visiting Brax's girlfriend, Ricky Sharpe (Bonnie Sveen), in the hospital, a bomb explodes. Heath is okay, but Bianca suffers a serious head injury, which causes some memory loss. A heavily pregnant Jess comes to the Bay to tell Heath that he is going to be a father. Heath helps deliver his son, Harley, on the beach and he spends time with Jess and Harley in Melbourne, causing a strain on his marriage. Heath soon learns that Jess has terminal cancer and when she dies, he brings Harley to live with him and Bianca. Bianca struggles to cope with Harley's presence and she and Heath break up. They eventually get back together, but Bianca soon learns that her transfer request to the city has been accepted. Heath encourages her to go, saying he will join her soon. Darcy's grandmother, Connie (Celia Ireland), initially refuses to let Darcy live with Heath and Bianca in the city, but later relents. After one final surf with his brothers, Heath says goodbye to his family. Bianca returns to collect Heath, Darcy and Harley and take them to their new place in the city. Heath attends Casey's funeral weeks later. Brax refuses to let him help seek revenge on Jake Pirovic (Fletcher Humphrys) and Heath replies that he does not want to bury Brax the following week. Brax tells Heath to go back to his family and let him take revenge on Jake by himself. Heath reluctantly does so.

Two years later, Heath follows Bianca to the Bay despite her asking him to give her some space. Bianca asks him to leave, but he stays in the Bay. Bianca invites him over to talk and it emerges that Heath killed Trevor Gunson (Diarmid Heidenreich). Heath punches Zac MacGuire (Charlie Clausen) after he sees Zac and Bianca talking and wrongly believes they are having an affair. Heath and Bianca eventually patch things up and Bianca discovers she is pregnant with Heath's baby. When Irene Roberts's son Mick Jennings (Kristian Schmidt), a convicted rapist who previously kidnapped Irene, escapes from a psychiatric hospital, Heath offers to go after Mick and dish out his own brand of "River Boy Justice". Heath and Bianca then bid farewell to Irene and return to the City.

Four years later, Heath is contacted by former River Boy gang member Dean Thompson (Patrick O'Connor) who enlists his help with dealing with some criminals who are hounding his former prison friend Ari Parata (Rob Kipa-Williams) and his brother Tane (Ethan Browne) who owe them money. After Paul (Jack Finsterer), one of the criminals, blackmails Ari and Tane into committing an armed robbery, Ari, Tane and Dean lure Paul and his accomplice Leon (Will McNeill) into an ambush by Heath, who shows up with more River Boys, for committing a crime on their territory. The River Boys beat Paul and Leon up and load them into their own vehicle to drive them away to be dumped. Dean introduces Heath to Tane and Ari and they thank him for his help. Heath then leaves with the other River Boys to dispose of Paul and Leon.

== Reception ==
For his portrayal of Heath, Ewing received a nomination for Most Popular New Male Talent at the 2012 Logie Awards. At the 2012 Inside Soap Awards, Ewing was nominated for Best Daytime Star. At the 2014 Logie Awards, Ewing earned a nomination for Most Popular Actor. In March 2011, Inside Soap ran a poll vote to determine who was the most liked of the Braxton brothers. Heath and Casey both received twenty-eight percent of the vote indicating that Brax was their favourite. Bree Hoskin of Gaydar Radio said that Heath is the "volatile middle Braxton boy".

Since their inception, the Braxton brothers have been well received. Claire Crick of All About Soap said the publications staff were happy with their arrival. Crick added that they liked "a new bad boy", but three being introcued at once and all being attractive was much better. British broadcaster Channel 5 aired a series titled "Top 20 Aussie Soap Moments of 2011". This was to determine viewers favourite moments from both Home and Away and Neighbours. The arrival of the Braxtons was voted viewers fourth favourite moment on 2011. The arrival of the River Boys was featured in the Inside Soap Yearbook 2012, as part of their "best bits" of March 2011. Their reporter noted that viewers were "aquiver" at the prospect of three attractive males arriving; despite the residents of Summer Bay not sharing their enthusiasm. With Heath's rise in popularity, came false Facebook accounts in Ewing's name and girls "lining up" to meet him. While interviewed by Jason Herbison of Inside Soap, series producer Lucy Addario said that the response from fans, concerning the River Boys had been "utterly overwhelming". She added that their inclusion meant the series could "explore many different storylines and play out lots of great plots."

Erin Miller of TV Week said that Heath and Bianca shared a "sizzling" romance. While Miller's colleague Carolyn Stewart said that she was happy when Heath gets "the flick" because in her opinion Bianca was better suited to Liam. Andrew Mercado writing for TV Week said that Home and Away was ignoring its core value of foster children in favour of the "much older River Boys". He said that he wanted to see less of them on-screen. While they were a success story and ratings wise, he noted that there were viewer concerns about the accompanying violence. He also predicted that the "tattooed surfie boys" will not be around forever because the actors will "try their luck in Hollywood". Laura Morgan from All About Soap said that "Heath's not fussy - he'll go for anything in a short skirt", due to his romance with April.
