= Ricky Sharpe (Home and Away) =

- Home and Away character
- Portrayed by: Bonnie Sveen
- Duration: 2013–2016, 2026
- First appearance: 2 April 2013
- Last appearance: 20 April 2026
- Introduced by: Lucy Addario
- Book appearances: Home and Away: An Eye for an Eye; Home and Away: New Beginnings
- Spin-off appearances: Home and Away: An Eye for an Eye (2015)
In-universe information
- Occupation: Photographer; Barmaid; Restaurant and Gym co-owner
- Brothers: Adam Sharpe
- Husband: Nate Cooper (2016)
- Sons: Casey Braxton
- Nephews: Jamie Sharpe

Ricky Sharpe is a fictional character from the Australian soap opera Home and Away, played by Bonnie Sveen. The actress previously made a guest appearance in the show as Hayley Doven in 2010. She also auditioned for the role of Bianca Scott, before she was cast as Ricky in early 2013. She made her first screen appearance during the episode broadcast on 2 April 2013. Ricky is portrayed as honest, fun, capable and someone with a good heart. Sveen said she shared some similarities with her character, including a passion for surfing. Ricky was introduced as the younger sister of Adam Sharpe (Martin Lynes) and a love interest for Darryl "Brax" Braxton (Steve Peacocke). Adam used Ricky to carry out a revenge scheme against Brax and his brothers.

Brax and Ricky later developed a relationship, which put some pressure on Sveen as Brax's previous relationship with Charlie Buckton (Esther Anderson) had been popular with viewers. Their story arc saw Ricky wait for an incarcerated Brax, a miscarriage, a marriage to Nate Cooper (Kyle Pryor) and another pregnancy, which resulted in the birth of Ricky and Brax's son. Sveen won the Logie Award for Most Popular New Talent in 2014 for her portrayal of Ricky. In April 2016, it was announced Sveen had left Home and Away after three years to pursue new acting roles, and she made her exit scenes aired on 7 June 2016. Sveen reprised the role in March 2026 for a storyline set and filmed in Western Australia, which revisits Ricky and Brax ten years on.

== Casting ==
In the 30 March – 5 April 2013 edition of TV Week, Erin Miller reported that actress Bonnie Sveen had been cast as Ricky Sharpe, a potential love interest for established character Darryl Braxton (Steve Peacocke). Sveen previously appeared in the small guest role of Hayley Doven in 2010. She later auditioned for the role of Bianca Scott, but Lisa Gormley was cast instead. Sveen told Tim Martain from The Mercury that she was "thrilled" to receive the ongoing role of Ricky. She continued, "I wanted Ricky more than anything I've ever auditioned for. I often think of my Nan [a huge fan of the show]. Home and Away was often on the telly at her house...and now I'm a River Girl." Sveen made her first screen appearance as Ricky on 2 April 2013.

== Development ==
=== Characterisation ===
Ricky is full of energy, brutally honest and completely capable of standing on her own two feet. She surfs, enjoys a drink, and can fix a broken down car better than most of the boys. That's not to say she's tomboy-ish… she's not. She's just completely comfortable in her own skin, and that makes her sexy as hell.

— An excerpt from Ricky's profile on the official Home and Away website.

In her fictional backstory, Ricky was surround by criminal activity due to her elder brother Adam Sharpe (Martin Lynes). When she was a teenager she rebelled against that world. Sveen explained that she put a lot of herself into the role, and described Ricky as "boisterous and fun", with "a wicked sense of humour". Ricky also has a fragile side and a good heart. Sveen said she was very similar to Ricky and stated, "We have the Huon River at home in Tasmania, so I guess I'm a bit of a 'River Girl' in real life! I have two brothers, and I grew up with a lot of male friends, so I can identify with Ricky being surrounded by all those Braxton boys." Sveen also said that they both loved their surfboards and that she had noticed that Ricky had become "more girlie" than when she first appeared. As Ricky is a pro surfer, Sveen took lessons on how to surf and hold the boards the right way. She explained, "I was pretty hungry to spend as much time as I could in and around the water and so made sure it became a big part of my life."

=== Introduction ===
Ricky came to Summer Bay to attend Heath Braxton's (Dan Ewing) engagement party. Ricky was a friend of the family. Peacocke commented, "Ricky was always the cheeky younger sister. She was always too young, but now she's grown up and looks great!" Ricky and Darryl Braxton (Steve Peacocke) spent the party getting reacquainted and Brax expressed his sorrow about Adam's death. Ricky and Brax later went back to his house and had a one-night stand. Peacocke said there was a spark between the characters and he believed Ricky would help take Brax back to a happier time. Sveen confirmed that Ricky was hiding a big secret, which made her cautious about starting a relationship with Brax, so she tried to keep him "at arm's length". Brax became curious about Ricky's past when he learned the police wanted to speak with her. Brax admitted that he had developed feelings for Ricky, in an attempt to get her to open up to him. Sveen commented, "Initially, she doesn't believe what he's telling her and is a bit terrified. She wants nothing more than to tell him what's going on, as that would simplify everything if she could be up-front." It later emerged that Adam was alive and using Ricky to exact his revenge on Brax and his brothers, as he believed that they had left him for dead.

When Ricky started to develop genuine feelings for Brax, she decided to end their relationship to protect him. She then visited Adam at his beach-side house, where he was recovering from the injuries he sustained in the roadside collision. Adam told Ricky that the Braxtons were "the scum of the earth" for leaving him to die, but she started to have doubts about his story as she had come to realise who the family really were. As part of the revenge scheme, Ricky used Brax's laptop to transfer a large sum of money into Connie Callahan's (Celia Ireland) bank account, in the hope that Connie would assume that Heath had sent her "dirty money" and revoke access to his daughter. The scheme helped to drive a wedge between the brothers, as Heath assumed that Brax had sent Connie the money to convince her to keep him away from his daughter. Ricky began to have regrets about the scheme and told Adam that Brax cared about him. However, Adam refused to listen and threatened to kill Brax if she did not do as she was told. Peacocke commented, "It's a really compromising situation. Adam is lying about this bloke she has started to fall in love with, and she's gutted because she is realising that Adam has got it all wrong." With Ricky's help, Adam framed Casey Braxton (Lincoln Younes) for armed robbery leading to his arrest. Realising that they had gone too far, Ricky pleaded with Adam to stop his revenge campaign against the Braxtons.

When she threatened to tell Brax the truth, Adam ordered Ricky to be held hostage alongside Tamara Kingsley (Kelly Paterniti), Casey's girlfriend. He then tried told Brax to choose which woman he wanted to save. Meanwhile, Tamara was shocked to learn that Ricky had been in on the plan from the start. Ricky convinced Tamara to trust her, before she seduced their guard and escaped. However, Tamara was too slow and the guard caught her. Ricky was also recaptured and Adam threatened to kill them both. After Brax and Kyle rescued a badly injured Tamara, Brax tried to get to Ricky before Adam could hurt her. He arranged to meet Adam at a warehouse, where he rescued Ricky. She tried to warn him that the whole thing was a trap, but Brax refused to leave her and Adam shot him. During the subsequent court case, Ricky knew there was a strong chance that she would be handed a prison sentence. Peacocke told an Inside Soap reporter that Brax realised that if he told the court that he and Ricky were in a relationship, he could avoid testifying against her. When Tamara, who was suffering with amnesia, took to the stand, she managed to recall that Ricky had tried to help her, which resulted in Ricky getting a suspended sentence.

=== Relationships ===
==== Darryl Braxton ====
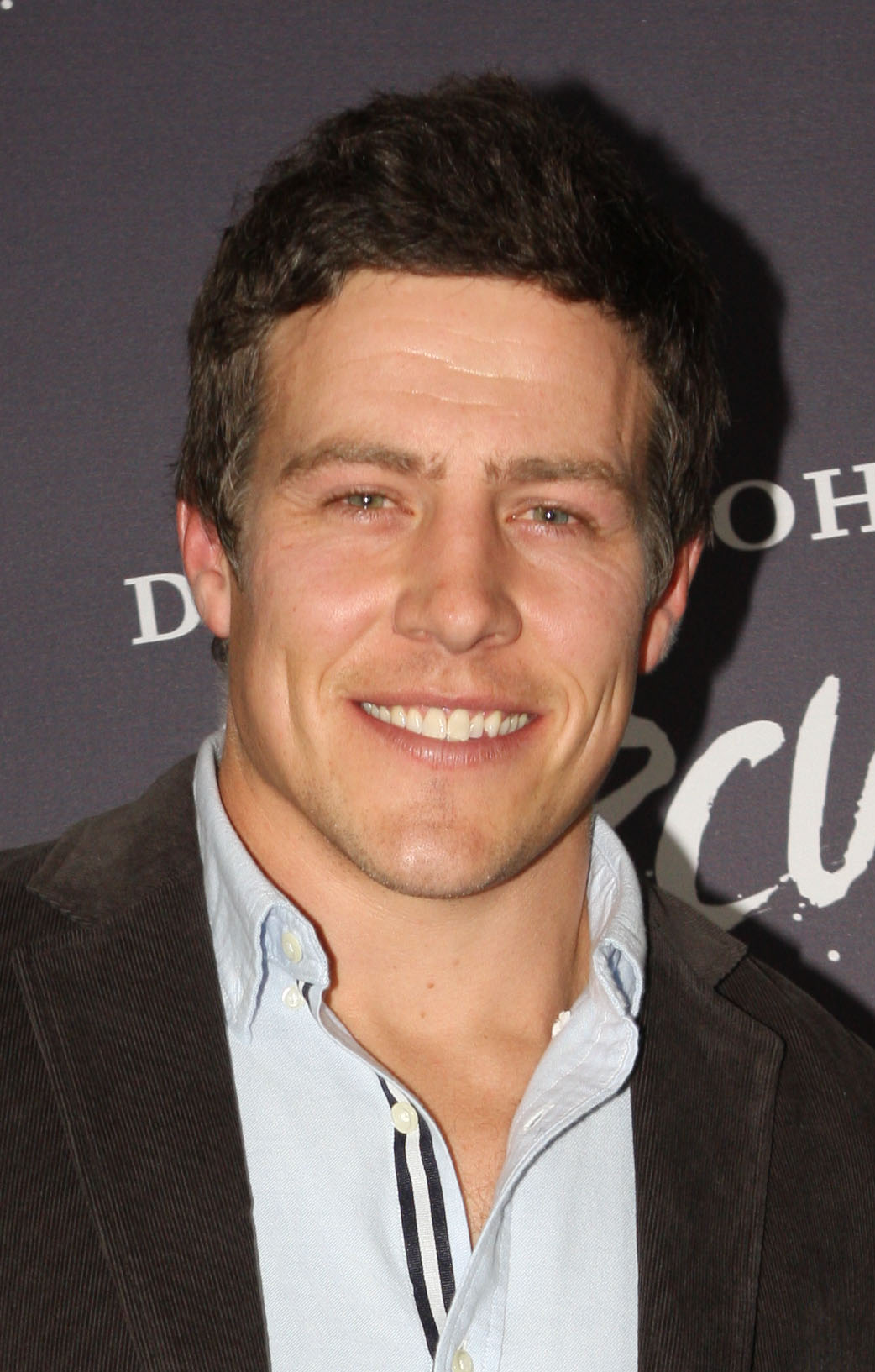
Actor Steve Peacocke (pictured) played Ricky's first love interest Brax.

Sveen admitted that she felt some pressure being cast as a love interest for Brax, following his popular relationship with Charlie Buckton (Esther Anderson). She said fans should accept that Ricky is "an entirely different character" that already shared history with the Braxtons. Having forgiven Ricky for her part in Adam's revenge scheme, Brax asked her to move in with him, causing a rift in the family. Ricky's initial instinct was to turn the offer down, knowing how much it would upset Casey. But she eventually changed her mind and accepted. Sveen told Gavin Scott from TV Week that Ricky was "still in disbelief" that Brax's love for her had over ridden everything that had happened. She also explained that as Ricky had known them all her life, she did not want to get in the way of Brax and Casey's relationship. Casey was displeased upon learning that Ricky was moving in, leaving her stuck in the middle as he and Brax argued.

A few months later, Brax started acting out of character when the Barrett brothers turned up in the Bay. His mysterious behaviour caused concern for Ricky and she was "disturbed by his inability to share". Ricky initially suspected that Josh Barrett (Jackson Gallagher) was Brax's son, but Brax soon admitted to accidentally killing Josh's father Johnny (Stephen Anderton). Speaking to Erin Miller of TV Week, Sveen told her that Ricky was "devastated" about Brax's confession and she also worried about how Brax would go about trying to redeem himself. Ricky begged Brax to keep quiet about Johnny's death, but he went to the police. After being found guilty of manslaughter, Brax was sent to prison for fifteen years. During their first visitation, Ricky was forced to consider how long they would be parted for. Sveen commented that Ricky was "heartbroken" as they were going to spend the rest of their lives together, and it was suddenly taken away from them. After Brax was led back to his cell, Ricky broke down in tears.

Shortly after another prison visit, Ricky fainted. She turned to Nate Cooper (Kyle Pryor) for help and he suggested that she might be pregnant. Ricky took a pregnancy which came back positive. Kyle offered her his support and agreed not to tell his brothers when she asked. Of the development, Sveen stated "Ricky is so torn every way she turns and has no idea what to do. The strange thing about this is, despite Ricky being so maternal and protective of the people around her, she never thought she would become a mother. She just never considered it would be an option for her." Sveen noted that while Ricky was conflicted, a baby would make the connection between Ricky and Brax stronger. Before Ricky could tell Brax about the pregnancy, he ended their relationship. Sveen called the scenes "taxing" and told Tvnz.co.nz that filming the story had "really hurt". Ricky later miscarried the baby.

After learning that Adam was present when Johnny was killed, Ricky and Casey visited him in prison and learned he was actually responsible. They persuaded Adam to confess to Johnny's murder and Brax was freed. He was initially hopeful that he and Ricky would reunite, but he then learned that she dating Nate. While Brax respected Nate, he made it clear to him that he wanted Ricky back. When Ricky went to London for a job, Brax followed her and declared his love for her. Ricky rejected him, but he refused to give up and later crashed her photography assignment. Sveen told Rebecca Lake of TV Week that while Ricky thought Brax's gesture in London was romantic, he also sabotaged the biggest opportunity of her life. After Brax was rushed to the hospital with a blood clot, Ricky remained by his side and she contemplated giving their relationship a second chance. Ricky and Brax later had sex, which left Ricky questioning whether she had made a mistake. However, with some good advice from Hannah Wilson (Cassie Howarth), Ricky and Brax reunited.

In 2015, Peacocke announced his departure from Home and Away. Brax's exit storyline saw him sent to prison for a murder he did not commit. Brax organised an escape plan during a prison transfer, but the car he was travelling in was run off the road into a river instead. To protect Ricky and his newborn son, Brax let everyone believe he was dead, except his best friend Ash (George Mason). Sveen told Kerry Harvey from Stuff.co.nz that she thought Brax's decision was "annoying", as she knew Ricky would have wanted to go with him. Sveen also spoke of Ricky's struggle with grief: "Brax has been a lifetime partner for her. She sort of grew up with him, had a bit of a crush on him. He's been her best friend and a sort of father figure to the people around her as well." Sveen added that it would be "disturbing" to see Brax reappear in the Bay again, but believed that Ricky would want him to help her raise their son.

==== Nate Cooper ====
Nate supported Ricky through her miscarriage and when she got caught up in a bomb explosion at the hospital. Having accepted that her relationship with Brax was over for good, Ricky decided to move on with Nate. Sveen explained that Nate appealed to Ricky as he did not have baggage, and he was not dangerous or complicated. He also believed in Ricky and wanted to see her achieve her dreams. Ricky was "braced for disapproval" from the Braxtons and she was not looking forward to the repercussions, but Sveen said she would not let herself be defined by other people's opinions. Sveen also said that Ricky had not stopped loving Brax, but it was easier to forget about him with the distance. During a Yahoo7 feature on Ricky's love triangle, Sveen admitted that she felt "very challenged" by the scripts for her character's new romance with Nate. She explained "I think it now will be very interesting to see how they take Ricky now as an independent character away from the Braxtons. She embarks on what feels like a crazy decision to go with Nate, at a time that feels far too soon."

Sveen thought Nate had opened up a new world for Ricky and he was allowing her a chance to reinvent herself, as well as reigniting her passion for photography. When Brax returned to the Bay, Nate asked him to stay away from Ricky. She saw his actions as "condescending" and became frustrated at his interference. Ricky eventually told Nate to leave her alone and he worried that he had lost her for good. When Ricky learned that Nate had secured her a photography job in London, she immediately sought out Brax to tell him the news first. On her return from London, Ricky came to the conclusion that she did not want to be with either Brax or Nate. Nate later arranged for them to meet at Angelo's, where he declared his love for Ricky and told her he wanted to make her happy. However, Ricky eventually reunited with Brax. Sveen later commented that Ricky's relationship with Nate had been a welcome distraction from the pain of her miscarriage.

=== Motherhood ===
"Playing pregnant with the prosthetic belly helped me grow performance-wise. Ricky already has a strong, earthy energy to her. She doesn't really need grounding, but it helped my performance to change balance by changing my body. It was fun to play."

— Sveen on how pregnancy affected her performance of Ricky

In late April 2014, Sveen started filming scenes for a pregnancy storyline. Ricky was "over the moon" when she learned she was pregnant with Brax's child. However, before she could tell him, she learned that Casey had been shot and killed. Ricky felt unable to tell Brax the news and she confided in Phoebe Nicholson (Isabella Giovinazzo), who urged her to be happy about the development before she worries about anyone else. In order to portray Ricky's pregnancy, Sveen was required to wear a prosthetic pregnancy suit for several months. The suit represented five different stages of the baby's growth. The storyline was played out over eight to nine months in real time, and Sveen commented that it felt "like the world's longest pregnancy. It's gone on for about a year since the time we started shooting." Sveen carried out research at the Royal Hospital for Women and spoke to a midwife about how Ricky's behaviour would be affected by the various stages of pregnancy.

Sveen said the pregnancy was one of her more memorable and fun storylines as an actor. Sveen filmed the birth scenes in late 2014. Ricky went into labour at home alone, forcing her to attract her neighbour John Palmer's (Shane Withington) attention. Sveen said that Ricky was "very scared" when she went into labour, as she did not think she would be doing it alone. She also said that Ricky was terrified without Brax and added, "she needs to manage everything and she doesn't like to lose that sense of control – she's been a bit of a matriarch and she finds it difficult to lean on other people." On the way to the hospital, John suffered a flat tyre, but they eventually made it to the ward. Kyle remained by Ricky's side as she gave birth to a son. Sveen told an Inside Soap writer, "It's an incredible moment for Ricky when she holds her son for the first time. She finally feels free of all the fear and anxiety. Her baby is her future now." The actress added that despite the circumstances of the birth, Ricky would be a strong, but loving mother.

A week after giving birth, Ricky introduced the baby to Brax for the first time. Sveen explained that Ricky was excited by the event and tried to remain upbeat during the meeting, knowing that Brax would have to go back to a lonely prison cell at the end. Ricky and Brax agreed to name their son Casey, after his late uncle. Following the visit, Ricky broke down and Sveen explained, "She doesn't feel the need to hide her sadness once she's out of Brax's sight. Ricky's able to drop the facade and let her feelings flood out. She's lonely and struggling, and feels a bit hopeless." A few weeks later, Ricky was told that Brax had died and she struggled to stop Casey from crying. Sveen thought the baby was picking up on Ricky's anxiety. Ricky also found it hard to look at Casey as he reminded her of Brax. When Marilyn Chambers (Emily Symons) offered to look after Casey for the evening, Ricky took the opportunity to skip town to grieve for Brax on her own. Sveen added that Ricky "cares for Casey deeply", but she was just in a dark place.

=== Marriage to Nate and Brax's return ===
Ricky eventually reconciled with Nate Cooper, and Sveen said Ricky was the "happiest she's been in a long time". At Zac MacGuire (Charlie Clausen) and Leah Patterson-Baker's (Ada Nicodemou) wedding reception, Nate proposes to Ricky. Sveen described the moment as "a fairy-tale proposal" and Ricky immediately says yes. However, shortly afterwards, she learned from Ash and Phoebe that Brax was still alive. Ricky went into shock and then realised that she was angry with Brax, who let her believe he was dead for six months. Sveen said, "Ricky finally has everything she wants in her life and then this news makes her perfect world explode." Nate did not take the news well and Ricky had to reassure him that it did not change anything between them. However, Nate chose to end their engagement, so she could deal with Brax. When asked if Ricky was still in love with Brax, Sveen replied that a part of her always would be, but learning that he was not dead just reaffirmed her love for Nate.

In the show's first two-hander episode, Ricky came face-to-face with Brax. He emerged from the bathroom, leaving Ricky "in absolute shock". He tried to explain his reasons for faking his own death and leaving her and Casey behind. Of Ricky's reaction, Sveen commented "Ricky isn't having a bar of it. She believes that Brax should have let her in on his plan. She can't understand why he wouldn't trust her with this secret, rather than someone like Ash." Brax asked for Ricky's forgiveness, but she made it clear to him that she was with Nate. Despite this, Brax tried to kiss her. Sveen explained that Ricky pulls away from the kiss and walks away, as she believes Nate is the right man for her. Brax begged Ricky to go on the run with him, but she refused and he left after being reunited with Casey. Sveen enjoyed filming the episode, saying it was good to work with Peacocke again.

=== Departure and return ===
On 5 April 2016, it was confirmed that Sveen would be leaving Home and Away as she had been cast in upcoming drama The Secret Daughter. Sveen thanked the cast, crew and viewers on her social media account following the announcement. She stated "Playing Ricky has shaped me forever. I carry every bond that was forged and so many fond memories, into the new beginning." Ricky departed on 7 June 2016, after reuniting with Brax.

On 24 August 2025, it was announced that Sveen and Peacocke would be reprising their roles for a 2026 storyline that revists their characters ten years on. It was filmed in Western Australia in October. Sveen expressed her excitement for the storyline, saying "Bringing Ricky back wasn't something I'd ever expected, so I'm beyond thrilled to reunite with Steve and old friends at Home And Away. Exploring where Ricky and Brax are now, 10 years on, will make for a very special and compelling storyline and I can't wait for our WA filming adventure." Julie McGauran, the director of scripted content at Network Seven, also stated that Ricky and Brax's return "is sure to make the fans very happy" as the characters had left "such a mark on Home And Away. She revealed that questions about their life since leaving Summer Bay would answered and teased "plenty of surprises along the way." The character, along with Brax and their son Casey (Austin Cutcliffe), return in the episode broadcast on 9 March 2026.

== Storylines ==
Ricky comes to Summer Bay for Heath Braxton and Bianca Scott's engagement party. She is reunited with her former crush Darryl Braxton and they have a one-night stand. They continue to meet up, but Ricky always disappears afterwards claiming that she has to work. Brax learns the police are looking for Ricky and she tells him that she has been dealing with her late brother, Adam's estate. Ricky accesses Brax's business account and transfers $100,000 to Connie Callahan, the grandmother of Heath's daughter. When Kyle Braxton notices the missing money, Ricky tells him Brax is having money troubles. When Brax declares his love for her, Ricky rejects him. She then meets up with Adam, and it emerges that he is using her to get revenge on the Braxtons. Ricky pays Kyle to collect a package, which contains a gun, and plants it in Casey's Braxton's flat. Ricky tries to convince her brother to abandon his revenge plan, but he refuses. He then frames Casey for armed robbery. When Ricky threatens to tell Brax about the revenge plan, Adam takes her hostage alongside Tamara Kingsley.

Ricky flirts with their guard and manages to overpower him and escape. However, she runs into Adam who takes her and Tamara to a warehouse. Ricky persuades Adam to release Tamara. Brax finds Ricky and frees her, before Adam shoots him. At the hospital, Ricky tells the police the truth about Adam's plan and her part in it. She tells Brax that she loves him and he later asks her to move in with him. At Ricky's trial, Brax refuses to testify, while Tamara remembers that Ricky tried to help her. Ricky is given a two-year suspended sentence. When Brax invites Josh Barrett to stay with them, Ricky initially believes that Brax is the boy's father. Brax explains that Josh's father, Johnny, had hit Casey and Brax pushed him away causing him to hit his head and die. Ricky asks Brax not to tell anyone, but he confesses to the police and is arrested. Brax is sent to prison for fifteen years, while Ricky agrees to support Josh. Ricky argues with Kyle when she learns that he warned her friend Nate Cooper away from her.

Ricky faints after visiting Brax in prison and Nate suspects she is pregnant, which is confirmed by a pregnancy test. The rest of the family find out, but before Ricky can tell Brax, he breaks up with her. When she starts bleeding, Ricky believes she is losing the baby. At the hospital, she is given the all-clear, but she is then caught up in a bomb explosion. Ricky suffers minor injuries, but later miscarries the baby. Ricky spends time with Nate and kisses him. After Heath tells her not to wait for Brax, she moves out and begins dating Nate. Adam contacts Ricky and she agrees to meet him, along with Casey. Adam admits that he actually killed Johnny and Brax is released, just as Ricky is offered a photography assignment in London. When she learns Nate warned Brax to stay away from her, she tells them both that she is going to London and might not come back. Ricky invites Bianca to come with her, while Brax, Heath and Casey follow them there. Brax pleads with Ricky to give him a second chance, but she rejects him. Bianca and Heath later tell Ricky that Brax has been struck by a car .

On her return home, Ricky breaks up with Nate. He tells her he loves her, but she has sex with Brax. She also tells him about the miscarriage and they get back together. Ricky is hurt when Nate introduces her to his estranged wife, Sophie Taylor (Bridgette Sneddon). Ricky tells Brax she wants a baby with him, but he replies that he does not want a child, as he is worried about turning into his father. He later changes his mind and Ricky discovers she is pregnant on the day Casey is killed by Jake Pirovic (Fletcher Humphrys). Ricky initially keeps the news from Brax, but tells him in a bid to halt his revenge campaign against Jake. Martin "Ash" Ashford turns up looking for Brax and he tells Ricky that he is a friend from prison. Ricky grows uncomfortable with Brax and Ash's friendship, especially when Brax misses an ultrasound appointment to help Ash. At their rescheduled appointment, they learn they are expecting a boy. Ricky helps organise a trip to the city to support Phoebe Nicholson's (Isabella Giovinazzo) record launch. However, the coach she is travelling on crashes injuring several people.

Brax is arrested for Dean Sanderson's (Kevin Kiernan-Molloy) murder and Ricky blames Ash. Ricky helps to distract Katarina Chapman (Pia Miller) while Brax and Ash briefly skip town. Brax initially agrees to a deal that would see him serve eight years in prison, but he changes his mind and pleads not guilty. He signs Angelo's and the gym over to her and Kyle. Brax is sentenced to twenty years in prison. Ricky suffers Braxton Hicks contractions. Nate fakes a medical emergency for Ricky, so she can see Brax and warn him that fellow prisoner Trevor "Gunno" Gunson (Diarmid Heidenreich) is after him. Phoebe and Denny Miller (Jessica Grace Smith) arrange a baby shower for Ricky. After opening the gifts, Ricky becomes emotional as the event makes her more aware of Brax's absence. Ricky goes into labour at home and John Palmer drives her to the hospital. She gives birth to her son with Kyle, Ash and Denny by her side. When Ricky takes the baby to see Brax for the first time, they agree to name him Casey.

Ricky worries when she cannot get Casey to stop crying, while it appears everyone else can. Nate suggests that Casey is picking up on her fear and tension. Kyle informs Ricky of Brax's plan to break out of jail and she decides to join him on the run. However, Kat breaks the news that Brax is presumed dead, after the car transferring him to a new prison had been run off the road into a river. Ricky accepts Brax's death and holds a small memorial for him. She later leaves Casey with Marilyn Chambers, while she goes away to grieve. On her return, Ricky holds a naming ceremony for Casey. Ricky grows close to Nate again, which makes his girlfriend, Kat, suspicious. Ricky and Nate later admit that they have feelings for each other, and they have sex. Kat throws a drink over Ricky when she learns the truth. Kat and Nate get back together, despite Nate's feelings for Ricky. Ricky tries to persuade Kyle not to leave the Bay and he kisses her. Nate eventually breaks up with Kat to be with Ricky.

After learning that Nate is estranged from his father, Ricky contacts Gavin Cooper (Daniel Roberts) and he comes to the Bay to see his son. Ricky encourages Nate to get to know Gavin. She also bonds with Gavin, but starts to feel uncomfortable when he makes comments about her appearance and then touches her when he gets drunk. Nate orders Gavin to leave town. Ricky convinces Nate to visit Gavin when he is admitted to hospital following a car crash. Ricky has a pregnancy scare and she and Nate agree to try for a baby in the future. She also admits to finding an engagement ring in his pocket. When Nate eventually proposes, Ricky accepts. Shortly after, she learns that Brax is alive. When Nate finds out, he ends their engagement. Casey falls ill with viral meningitis, bringing Nate and Ricky back together. She asks him to marry her and he accepts. When she returns from the hospital, Ricky is greeted by Brax. She expresses her anger over his decision to fake his death and abandon her and Casey. Brax asks Ricky to leave the Bay with him, but she refuses and they say goodbye. Nate, Ricky and Casey temporarily move into the Palmer's house. Nate and Ricky also set a date for the wedding, but Ricky suffers doubts in the lead up to the day when Brax texts her to wish her well.

== Reception ==
For her portrayal of Ricky, Sveen was nominated for Best Daytime Star at the 2014 Inside Soap Awards. That same year, she won the Most Popular New Talent accolade at the Logie Awards. The following year, Sveen earned a nomination for the Most Popular Actress Logie. She was also nominated for Best Daytime Star at the 2015 Inside Soap Awards for a second time. While Ricky and Brax earned the TV Week and Soap Extra #OMGAward for Favourite Couple. In 2016, Sveen was again nominated for Most Popular Actress at the Logie Awards.

A TV Week writer stated that Ricky had "been a force to be reckoned with since arriving in Summer Bay." While Tony Stewart, writing for the Daily Record, observed "Ricky's been involved in some very dodgy doings in the Bay". Another TV Week columnist noted that "sparks flew when Ricky and Brax saw each other again at Heath’s (Dan Ewing) engagement party..." Shannon Molloy of news.com.au commented that Ricky had become one the show's most popular characters, and that she and Brax were also "firm fan favourites". A contributor to the Inside Soap Yearbook proclaimed that Ricky "was the luckiest girl in Australia when she bagged hunky doctor Nate." In 2016, Sarah Ellis of Inside Soap quipped "Mum, businesswoman, and romancer of Hunky Doctor Nate. Ricky, we salute you!"

In 2018, writers for TV Week included Ricky in their feature on the "Top 20 Home And Away characters of all time". They wrote, "Honest and with a heart of gold, Ricky Sharpe is one of the all-time sweethearts of Summer Bay. However, what endeared her most to Home and Away fans was that she became one part of the super-couple that was Brax and Ricky. From incarceration to a miscarriage, marriage and eventually a baby son, their relationship was a rollercoaster. The popularity of the pair as a couple throughout all the drama cemented their status as Summer Bay royalty. All hail the king and queen!"

In November 2021, three critics for The West Australian placed Ricky at number 39 in their feature on the "Top 50 heroes we love and villains we hate" from Home and Away. They praised the character, stating: "Blonde bombshell Ricky Sharpe quickly became the Bay's sweetheart. Her romance with Brax led to fans dubbing the pair 'Bricky'. Their relationship wasn't without its problems — from his incarceration to a miscarriage, her short-lived marriage to Cooper (Kyle Pryor) and the birth of her and Brax's son. It was a rollercoaster from start to finish, and fans couldn't get enough."
