= Darryl Braxton =

- Home and Away character
- Portrayed by: Stephen Peacocke
- Duration: 2011–2016, 2026
- First appearance: 16 February 2011
- Last appearance: 20 April 2026
- Introduced by: Cameron Welsh
- Book appearances: Home and Away: New Beginnings
In-universe information
- Occupation: Businessman
- Father: Danny Braxton
- Mother: Cheryl Braxton
- Brothers: Heath Braxton
- Half-brothers: Kyle Braxton; Casey Braxton
- Sons: Casey Braxton
- Nephews: Rocco Scott-Braxton; Harley Braxton
- Nieces: Darcy Callahan

Darryl "Brax" Braxton is a fictional character from the Australian soap opera Home and Away, played by Stephen Peacocke. He made his first screen appearance during the episode broadcast on 16 February 2011. The character was created and introduced along with his two brothers; Heath (Dan Ewing) and Casey (Lincoln Younes). The trio were part of The River Boys and were inspired by the real life Bra Boys group. When Peacocke learnt about the role of Brax, he initially thought he would not suit the part as he is from the country. However, after learning more about the character, Peacocke successfully auditioned for the role. Before the character's arrival on screen, Debbie Schipp of The Daily Telegraph described him as being a "beach bum" with a reputation for being an "awesome" surfer.

Brax is a feared member of the River Boys, a surfie group from Mangrove River, and he commands a respect from them. However, Brax has always wanted to make something of himself and Peacocke revealed that he wanted a successful family life. Brax storylines often revolved around his long-running relationship with Charlie Buckton (Esther Anderson) until her death. Brax dealt with his grief by cage-fighting, which he started doing to pay off a debt. Brax later had relationships with Natalie Davison (Catherine Mack) and Ricky Sharpe (Bonnie Sveen), who also gave birth to Brax's son. Peacocke's departure was announced on 1 February 2015 and Brax made a temporary exit on 10 June 2015, before returning on 9 December. He initially departed on 7 June 2016. For his portrayal of Brax, Peacocke won the Logie Awards for Most Popular New Male Talent and Most Popular Actor. Peacocke later reprised the role alongside Sveen for a storyline that revisited their characters ten years later, making his final appearance on 20 April 2026.

== Creation and casting ==
In 2010, Network Seven began running teaser trailers for a new trio of characters known as The River Boys. Said to be a "bad-boy surf gang with dodgy reputations", The River Boys initially consisted of three brothers – Casey, Heath and Darryl "Brax" Braxton. Kristy Kelly of Digital Spy reported Koby Abberton and his gang, known as the Bra Boys, were the inspiration for The River Boys. Steve Peacocke was cast as eldest Braxton brother, Darryl. He heard about the role from his agent and he was initially unsure he would suit the part as he is from the country. Once Peacocke understood what type of person Darryl was, he believed he could offer something to the role. Peacocke said the audition process was "a lot of fun" and during a call back, he got to work with Esther Anderson, which made him less nervous. Peacocke made his on screen debut as Brax on 16 February 2011.

On 9 May 2013, it was announced that Peacocke would be taking a break from Home and Away, so he could film a role in Hercules: The Thracian Wars. The actor thanked the show's producers and the network for allowing him the time off from the soap and producer Lucy Addario said "Steve is a truly great actor so it is no surprise that Hollywood has come calling. We are thrilled to be able to give Steve this short break from Home and Away and support him as he takes up this amazing opportunity." Peacocke returned to Home and Away in September.

== Development ==
=== Characterisation ===
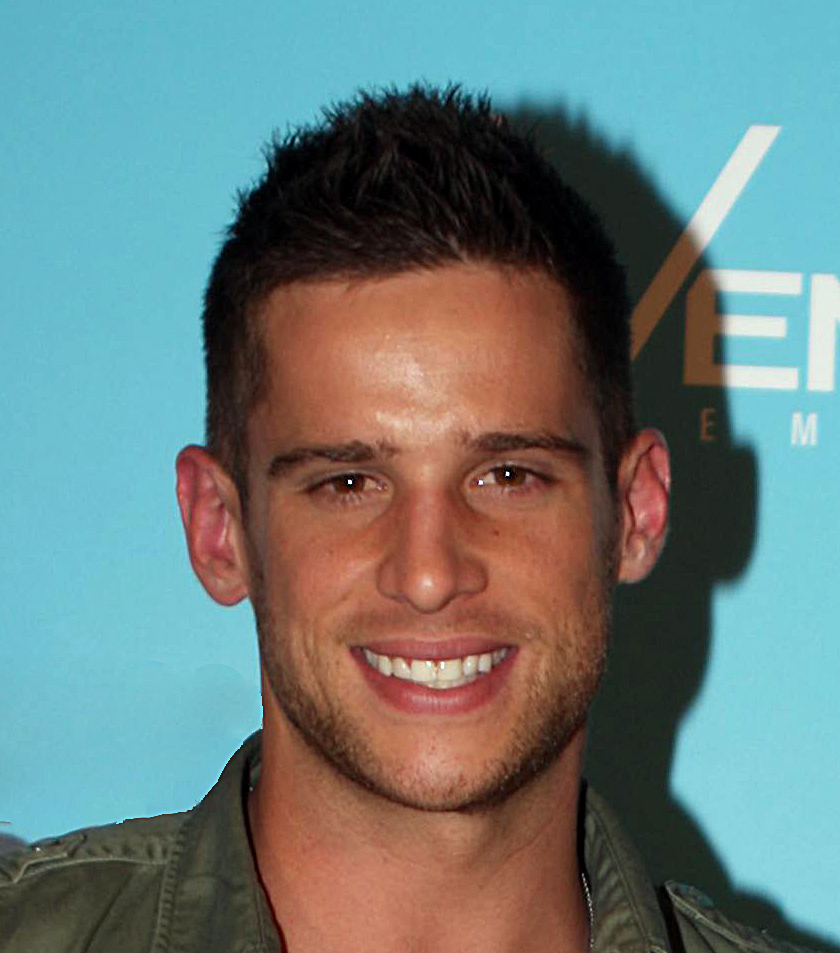
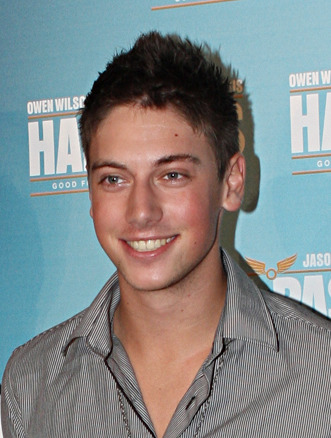
Dan Ewing (left) and Lincoln Younes (right) portray Brax's younger brothers Heath and Casey.

Upon the character's announcement, Debbie Schipp of The Daily Telegraph reported Darryl was a "beach bum" who has an awesome reputation as a surfer. Amy Edwards of the Newcastle Herald stated that he is the most revered of the Braxton brothers and a "reckless and feared member of the River Boys." Peacocke said the character was first described to him as the leader of an outlaw surfie gang, which made him think of all the men he had met who play sport and are feared, but able to lead their teams at the same time. Peacocke explained to Daniel Kilkelly of Digital Spy that he had learnt a lot from playing Darryl, as he comes from a completely different background to him. When Darryl was twelve, his father walked out on his mother, Cheryl (Suzi Dougherty) and his two brothers, Heath (Dan Ewing) and Casey (Lincoln Younes). Darryl became the man of the house and he tried to keep his younger brothers out of trouble. Despite developing a friends with benefits relationship with Tegan Callahan (Saskia Burmeister), Darryl had never been in love before coming to Summer Bay.

A Channel Seven website writer described Darryl as having a "dodgy reputation and a chip on his shoulder." He is a surfing legend in his home town of Mangrove River because he was one of the first surfers to take on the rip tides at Wilson's Beach and develop his own surfing style. The Seven writer explained that because Darryl is fearless, he commands a respect from the rest of the surfers that he finds useful. However, Darryl is a "reluctant hero" and a reporter from Channel 5's Home and Away website commented that he became determined to leave Mangrove River, so he could forge a career as a legitimate business owner. Peacocke backed this statement up, saying Darryl wanted to make something of himself and escape the way of life associated with the River Boys. He later explained "He's a bloke who wants to escape his upbringing. He has been pigeon-holed in Summer Bay because of his looks but he wants a legitimate life. He doesn't want riches. At the end of the day he just wants a successful family life." During his tenure on the show, Peacocke spent an hour in make-up every day getting the River Boys' trademark "Blood and Sand" tattoos painted on his body. The actor revealed the most uncomfortable aspect of playing Darryl was having to take his shirt off. He called it a "show pony thing to do" and was embarrassed by it.

=== Relationship with Charlie Buckton ===
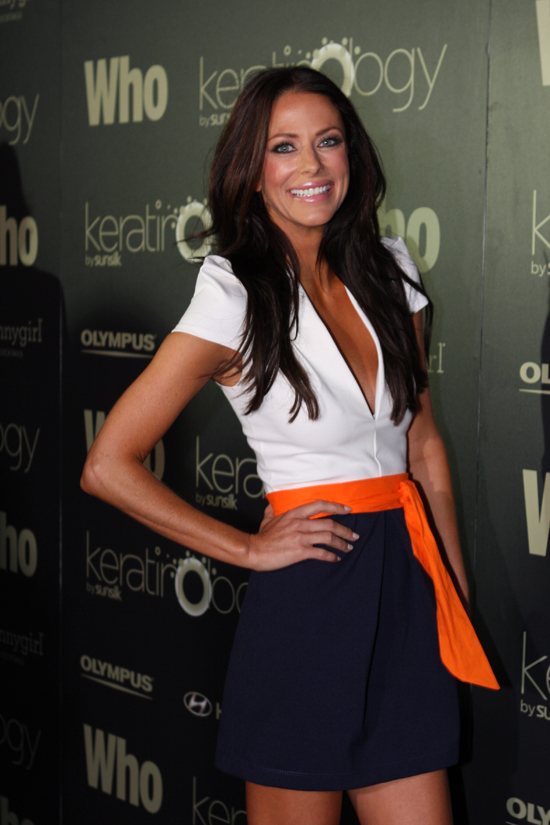
Esther Anderson portrayed Brax's first love interest Charlie Buckton.

Prior to their on-screen introduction, Schipp of The Daily Telegraph reported that Brax would become involved with Charlie Buckton (Esther Anderson). Brax meets Charlie after she comes to ask him to keep his surf gang under control. During his interview with Digital Spy, Peacocke was asked if Brax likes Charlie romantically and he said, "For a bloke like Brax, Charlie is pretty ideal – she's smart, sexy and is strong enough to take him on. He's all about testing himself and he knows he'll be running a gauntlet if he pursues her. She's got that X-factor he can't ignore." When a fight breaks out at the Surf Club, Charlie arrives to investigate and she asks Brax to step outside, so they can talk. Brax misinterprets the situation and believes Charlie just wants to be alone with him, so he kisses her. Charlie is horrified by his actions and she arrests him for assaulting a police officer. After Brax's arrest, things began to develop "dangerously" between him and Charlie. Prior to the episodes airing, Peacockeanticipated that viewers would find the dynamic tense to watch.

Charlie comes under pressure from the community to find a more serious crime to charge Brax with. She starts to believe that he is selling stolen alcohol to Angelo Rosetta (Luke Jacobz), but everything checks out and Brax realises the kiss has "sparked something" in her. The Daily Telegraph's Colin Vickery proclaimed that Brax had turned Charlie's safe world upside down. While Anderson told him "What is wonderful about this relationship is that it is forbidden love. There is this element of danger that brings excitement along with it. It is quite different for Charlie. In all her previous relationships she has been hesitant and held back physically and with her feelings." The actress branded the relationship "quite fun and flirty." Just as Charlie starts to trust Brax, his ex-girlfriend, Tegan, arrives in the Bay. Peacocke revealed that Tegan comes to do his mother's bidding. After Brax clashes with Cheryl, she contacts Tegan and gets her to work out what has been going on with him.

Tegan tries to win Brax back, but is shocked to find he has moved on with Charlie. Even though they share a history, Brax does not trust Tegan and when he learns she has threatened Charlie, he order her to leave town. A show spokesperson said "Brax tells Tegan he wants nothing to do with her. As far as he's concerned, she's very much in his past and he has no interest in her any more. She's devastated when he tells her to leave. But there really is nothing worse than a woman scorned." Discussing the storyline during its original broadcast, Peacocke noted that Brax and Charlie's relationship would remain complicated until Tegan departed. Charlie suspects Brax has been involved in a drugs operation and breaks up with him. Brax is "gutted" when she ends their relationship and wants her back. He "puts his heart on the line" and begs her to try again, but she puts her duties as a policewoman first. After he is rejected, Brax has sex with Tegan and Charlie finds them together. During the storyline's original broadcast, Peacocke stated it was hard to predict if Brax and Charlie would get back together, while Vickery quipped that it was obvious Charlie could not stay away from Brax for long.

Brax is linked to an armed robbery, but Charlie, who is investigating the crime, believes Brax is innocent from the start. She decides to interfere with police evidence, but feels guilty about what she has done and goes away to a cabin for a few days with a friend. Brax later turns up and while he and Charlie are talking, he reveals that he still loves her. They get back together, but on the way home they crash into Liam Murphy (Axle Whitehead) on his motorbike. Realising Charlie and Brax should be seen together, Heath tells the police that he hit Liam. Charlie then decides to leave the police force. Brax and Charlie decide to move to the city, accompanied by her daughter Ruby (Rebecca Breeds) and Casey. Peacocke stated "Brax is now with the one he loves. Charlie's left her job and her career for him, and he's left the brotherhood and the River Boys for her. They both realise what they had in Summer Bay is no longer there, so it's time for a fresh start somewhere completely new." However, Charlie is shot and critically injured by Jake Pirovic (Fletcher Humphrys). When they learn that there is nothing more the doctors can do for her, Ruby and Brax make the decision to turn off Charlie's ventilator. Anderson knew some fans would be disappointed that Brax and Charlie did not end up together, but the series producer had told her that after investing so much in the couple, killing Charlie off was the best option.

=== Cage fighting ===
On 13 February 2012, it was announced that Brax would take part in a cage fighting storyline. He decides to take part in the sport to raise some quick money to pay back Leah Patterson-Baker (Ada Nicodemou), who gave money to Geoffrey King (Geoff Morrell) on his behalf. Peacocke revealed that Brax is angry with Leah for paying his debt off and "coming to his rescue". Peacocke spent weeks rehearsing the choreography for the fight scenes with a stunt coordinator. The Daily Telegraph's Colin Vickery reported that the actor was often hurt during the training and he was left with cuts and grazes over his back. Vickery revealed that the cage fighting helped Brax with his grief over Charlie's death, while Peacocke told him "Every bloke has been through a tough time and you just want to punish yourself. There are plenty of blokes out there that can't deal with things emotionally and don't want to talk to anyone about it and they just want to put themselves in harm's way. Brax wants to feel some pain. For him, it is cathartic."

Brax is knocked unconscious during a robbery at his restaurant, but decides to go ahead with a cage fight. Despite knowing he is not fit to fight, Brax "puts himself in danger by taking part in another tough battle". Leah tries to talk him out of it, but Brax ignores her pleas and goes ahead with the fight. Brax is risking his own health and things soon take a turn for the worse. Peacocke explained "He wins the fight, but he's taken so many blows to the head - and that, coupled with the mugging, tips him over the edge and he passes out and has a fit." Brax is taken to the hospital, which is difficult for him because it is where Charlie died. He struggles with his grief and Leah tries to help him. When Leah puts her hand on his, Brax then realises that she has feelings for him. Speaking to TV Week's Erin McWhirter, Peacocke revealed that his character is shocked by it and did not see it coming. In his interview with Digital Spy's Kilkelly, the actor called the cage fighting storyline "awesome" and he expressed his wishes to return to it in the future.

=== Relationship with Natalie Davison ===
"Brax is a pretty complicated bloke and also very protective - of himself and his family. He's not the type to go along with something just for the ride. Charlie was unique and will always hold a special place in his heart, but he needs to move on. Natalie's a pretty special woman, so yes it will be serious for him."

— Peacocke on whether Brax's relationship with Natalie would be serious. (2012)

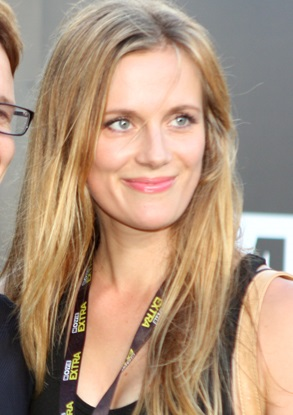
Catherine Mack plays Natalie Davison.

In June 2012, it was revealed that school counsellor Natalie Davison (Catherine Mack) would become Brax's new love interest. Some Home and Away fans voiced their "outrage" at Brax's new romance on social networking sites, while others thought he should date Leah instead. Peacocke told Kilkelly "The reaction has been mixed, mostly because people miss the whole Charlie and Brax storyline. But the new relationship has been equally exciting to play and is taking a new direction. I think fans are really starting to see it as something new and enjoying it." Mack told a TV Week writer that Natalie finds Brax interesting, while Brax respects her for trying to help Casey. He likes that she brings out a new side in himself. Peacocke thought Natalie was a "good fit" for his character and hoped he could offload some of his baggage, so he could move forward with her. Mack told TV Week's Gavin Scott that Natalie finds Brax attractive, but he is not at the front of her mind because she is focused on helping Casey through his issues. However, to help Casey, she must go through Brax and learn more about their situation. Brax and Natalie arrange to have a drink together, but he is forced to cancel so he can deal with a family emergency.

Brax and Natalie later have a one-night stand. Brax runs into Natalie shortly after making a drug deal to raise some money. She is suspicious and annoyed that he has not been in contact with her, just as they were starting to build up a relationship to help Casey. Peacocke told Scott that Brax does not want Natalie thinking he is a drug dealing criminal because he has spent time with her trying to prove that he is not, so he shuts down. Mack said "She can see through his act. She believes with her whole heart he's a good person. She will not stop until she makes him realise that." At that moment, Brax and Natalie connect and share "an intense kiss", which leads to them spending the night together. Mack stated that "caution is thrown to the wind" and neither Brax or Natalie think about what they are doing. Peacocke revealed that the next day Brax starts rethinking and regretting, while Natalie wonders if she has crossed a line. The couple decide to put their romance on hold, so Natalie can continue to counsel Casey without anything getting in the way. Brax agrees with the plan, even though Casey insists they should put their relationship first. Mack revealed that Natalie and Brax would share more scenes together, saying "Their attraction to each other is undeniable, and even though it's not the key focus, they can't help but continue to be around each other and be attracted to each other."

=== Departure and returns ===
On 1 February 2015, Jonathon Moran of The Daily Telegraph reported that Peacocke had quit Home and Away to pursue new acting roles in Hollywood. Peacocke filmed his final scenes in December 2014. Of his departure, he stated "It wasn't something I was looking forward to because I love the show and the people I work with so much. But I think the key to any good TV series or any good storytelling is to leave the audience at the right point, and where we got to with Brax, we hit a point where it was the best point for him to exit the show. It was just the perfect time I guess." Brax was the last of the original three Braxton brothers to leave the show. His exit storyline saw the car transferring him to jail run off the road and plunge into a lake. David Knox from TV Tonight commented that storyliners would have left the door open for Peacocke to return in the future. Brax departed on 10 June.

On 22 August 2015, Moran announced that Peacocke had returned to Home and Away to shoot scenes for episodes that would air in late 2015. Of his return, Peacocke commented "It is a nice little surprise. It was a good story the producers put to me, so I thought it is a nice way to see everyone for a bit. It will be an interesting little twist. While Brax is in the Bay it will spice things up a bit, I think." Peacocke's return storyline was kept top-secret, and was not revealed until his episodes were broadcast. Ahead of Brax's final appearance, Home and Away aired their first two-hander episode on 15 February 2016. The episode featured Brax and Ricky discussing their relationship and his decision to fake his death. The character made his final appearance on 7 June 2016, where he reunited with Ricky and his son.

On 24 August 2025, it was announced that Peacocke and Sveen would be reprising their roles for a 2026 storyline that revisits their characters ten years later. It was filmed in Western Australia in October. Of his return to the serial, Peacocke stated: "When the producers asked if I'd revisit Brax, it felt like a fun opportunity – and one I think the audience will really enjoy. Filming in spectacular outback Western Australia is the icing on the cake." He also expressed his gratitude to the show for launching his career and his appreciation for the fans who have followed his acting career since his departure. Julie McGauran, the director of scripted content at Network Seven, also stated that Ricky and Brax's return "is sure to make the fans very happy" as the characters had left "such a mark on Home And Away. She revealed that questions about their life since leaving Summer Bay would answered and teased "plenty of surprises along the way." The character, along with Ricky and their son Casey (Austin Cutcliffe), returned in the episode broadcast on 9 March 2026.

== Storylines ==
Brax and the River Boys go along to a singles night at Angelo's restaurant. They start a brawl and Brax's brother, Heath, punches Miles Copeland (Josh Quong Tart). The following day, Brax tries to smooth things over and visits Angelo Rosetta with a case of alcohol to make up for what happened in his restaurant. Angelo accepts the apology and Brax makes him an offer to supply the restaurant with some cheap alcohol. The River Boys start causing trouble around the town and local policewoman Charlie Buckton keeps an eye on them. Brax starts making suggestions on how to improve Angelo's restaurant and goes into partnership with him. He later uses the restaurant for money laundering. Brax takes Leah Patterson-Baker out to lunch in order to ask her more about Charlie. When trouble with the River Boys escalates, Charlie is called to the Surf Club to sort it out. She takes Brax outside to talk, but he kisses her and is arrested. However, Brax's lawyer gets him released. Charlie later comes to Brax and asks him to keep his younger brother, Casey, away from her daughter, Ruby. During an argument, Brax kisses Charlie and they have sex. Charlie later tells him it was a mistake, however she starts to feel that she misjudged him and they begin a secret relationship.

Angelo discovers the Braxton's have a marijuana crop in the National Park and Heath knocks him out. Brax tells Charlie that he has nothing to do with the crop and gets a member of their gang to drop Angelo off at the hospital. Brax realises Brodie Upton (Guy Edmonds) has stolen drugs from him and he sets him up to be arrested. However, Brodie avoids the police and threatens Brax with a gun. He finds out about Brax and Charlie's relationship, before Brax manages to get him out of town. Charlie decides to publicly reveal her romance with Brax, but Morag Bellingham (Cornelia Frances) warns them both against it. Angelo also discovers the relationship and blackmails Brax into buying his half of the restaurant. Brax finds out Casey has quit school, but he manages to get him to change his mind. This causes Cheryl to throw Casey out of their home and he and Brax stay in a motel. Tegan Callahan arrives in town and tries to get back with Brax. She discovers his new relationship with Charlie and Brax orders her to leave. Heath challenges Brax's leadership of the River Boys and Brax decides to leave the group. Heath plans to raid Jake Pirovic drug crop and Tegan tells Brax that Jake is going to ambush him. Charlie arrests both Heath and Jake following the raid.

When Brax does not deny he is involved with the drug dealing, Charlie breaks up with him. Tegan reveals that Jake asked her to hide some drugs for him and Heath and Brax help her. Brax and Tegan have a one-night stand, which Charlie finds out about. Jake is released and he demands his drugs back. He takes Ruby and Casey hostage, until Brax hands the drugs over. A fight breaks out and Brax is stabbed. Charlie finds him and takes him to hospital. Tegan states that her daughter, Darcy (Alea O'Shea), is Brax's and he tries to bond with her. However, Tegan later reveals that Darcy is actually Heath's daughter. Brax and Charlie get back together and Heath finds out about them, forcing Charlie to reveal the truth to her superior. A gang war breaks out and Jake's brother, Hammer (Benedict Samuel), has Heath beaten up. Tegan is injured in a car accident and she tells Brax that she revealed his relationship with Charlie to Hammer, before dying. Brax learns Casey burnt Jake's place down and tries to cover up the crime. Hammer kidnaps Charlie and lures Brax to a container to kill him. A fight breaks out and Charlie shoots Hammer dead. Casey is found guilty of the arson attack at Jake's place and sent to juvie. Brax begins dating Hayley O'Connor (Alyssa McClelland).

Brax is linked to an armed robbery and learns he has been set up on Jake's orders. He admits to the police that he was in bed with Hayley at the time of the robbery, but she refuses to confirm his story. Charlie informs Brax that she and a fellow officer are moving the evidence against him and tells him where they will be stopping, allowing Brax to steal it. Brax joins Charlie at a cabin and on the way home they crash into Liam Murphy. Heath and Bianca Scott (Lisa Gormley) tell the police they hit Liam to protect Brax and Charlie. When Charlie quits the police, she and Brax decide to move to the city with Ruby and Casey. However, Jake returns to the Bay and shoots Charlie. Brax finds her and she is rushed to the hospital, where he and Ruby are told that Charlie is brain dead. Brax initially refuses to give up on Charlie, but he eventually decides to let her ventilator be turned off. Ruby accuses Brax of being responsible for Charlie's death and he starts drinking. Brax becomes angry with Heath for accepting stolen alcohol from Geoffrey King and returns it. However, Geoffrey demands $25,000 or the restaurant. Leah stops Brax from burning Angelo's down and he becomes furious when she pays Geoffrey off. To pay her back, Brax begins cage fighting.

One night, Brax is knocked unconscious when someone robs the restaurant. He refuses to pull out of his next fight and he collapses shortly after winning. Brax is taken to hospital to recover and Leah stays with him. Brax then realises she has feelings for him. When Leah gets drunk, Brax takes her home and she tries to kiss him. Brax learns Heath has hired Hayley as his lawyer and he takes her to a clifftop, where he blames her for getting Jake out of jail. Hayley hits him with a rock and dares him to kill her, but Brax lets her go. Brax learns Heath is trying to get their father, Danny (Andy McPhee), out of jail and warns him against it. Brax visits Danny and remains convinced that he has not changed. Casey questions Brax about Danny and he reveals that he used to take him out of the house when Danny got angry and that he once put Heath in hospital. Brax is unhappy when Casey visits Danny and gets on well with him. He also dislikes it when school counsellor Natalie Davison tries to talk to him about Casey's feelings and shuts the door on her when she mentions Charlie. Danny is freed from prison and he moves into the Caravan Park. Brax manages to get his mother to leave town and tells Danny that his money that he left behind is gone.

Danny demands that Brax pay back his money and Brax agrees. He is later knocked out and left out in the bush to die, but Sid Walker (Robert Mammone) finds him and takes him back home. Brax then realises Danny ordered the attack. To get some money to pay his father back, Brax organises a drugs deal, which goes wrong when the police turn up. However, Brax successfully hides the drugs away and completes the deal. When he runs into Natalie, he pushes her away. However, she tells him she is not scared of him and they have sex. Casey admits to Brax that he is spending time with Danny, so he can stay one step ahead and stop him from targeting Ruby and her money. Brax learns Casey has gone off with Danny, who has been planning to rob a local pub. Brax and Natalie get to the pub just as a shot rings out. They find Casey has shot Danny and he later dies. Brax tries to intimidate the only witness into going along with a fabricated story, but Casey confesses to the crime. He struggles to cope with what he has done, so Brax and Natalie decide to put their relationship on hold to help him. Brax realises Casey is hurting and they decide to spend some time together in the forest. After going to get some food, Brax returns to the camp to find Casey gone. He and Natalie drive out to the desert to find Casey and learn that he has been kidnapped by Kyle Bennett (Nic Westaway), Casey and Brax's half-brother.

== Reception ==
=== Accolades ===
For his portrayal of Brax, Peacocke was nominated for Best Male Performance at the 2011 AACTA Television Awards. He went on to win the Logie Award for Most Popular New Male Talent in 2012. Peacocke was also nominated for Best Daytime Star at the 2012 Inside Soap Awards. In 2013, Peacocke won the Most Popular Actor Logie Award. He was also nominated for Most Popular Personality On Australian TV. That same year, Peacocke also won Best Daytime Star at the Inside Soap Awards. In 2014, Peacocke received nominations for Most Popular Actor and Most Popular Personality on TV at the Logie Awards. He was nominated in the same categories the following year, and won Most Popular Actor. Peacocke won three awards at the 2015 TV Week and Soap Extra #OMGAwards for Favourite Couple between Brax and Ricky, Best Abs, and Best Storyline for Brax's fake death/escape. Peacocke earned a nomination for Best Actor at the 2016 Logie Awards.

=== Critical response ===
When Inside Soap ran a poll asking readers which Braxton brother they liked the most, Darryl came in first place with 44% of the vote. In March 2011, Tristan Swanwick and Nathanael Cooper of The Courier-Mail reported that fans of the Braxton brothers had set up Facebook pages for the three actors and used personal photos of them. The accounts attracted many fan messages and friend requests. Swanwick and Cooper commented "One would have thought the difficulty of being cast as a "River Boy" on Home and Away would be the ever-present threat of a Bra Boy taking offence to a storyline." Andrew Mercado writing for TV Week said that Home and Away was ignoring its core value of families and foster children in favour of the River Boys and he wanted to see less of them on-screen. While they were a success story and ratings wise, he noted that there were viewer concerns about the accompanying violence. He also predicted that the "tattooed surfie boys" would not be around forever because the actors would want to try their luck in Hollywood. Channel 5 included the arrival of the Braxtons in their "Top 20 Aussie Soap Moments of 2011" program, with the storyline came fourth overall.

A writer for the Inside Soap Yearbook proclaimed the character's screen debut was one of "The Best Bits of March 2011." A Western Mail reporter commented "Ever since the Braxtons sauntered into the Bay, they've been nothing but trouble." Carena Crawford from All About Soap blamed Brax for Charlie's death and commented "Bad boys are trouble. And despite all Brax's claims that he was going straight, he'd still angered enough people in the past to get his girlfriend killed." In 2012, TV Week readers voted Charlie and Brax their most popular Home and Away couple of all time. They received fifty per cent of the vote and Peacocke said "I think fans enjoyed the drama, but they're disappointed Charlie is gone and there isn't the opportunity for her to return." In 2015, Laura Withers of Inside Soap commented "Brax may be prime Summer Bay beef, but he hasn't got an ounce of common sense!"
