= Adrenalin...Heart =

- Written by: Georgia Fitch
- Characters: Leigh; Angel
- Original language: English
- Genre: Drama

Premiere
- Date premiered: 2002
- Place premiered: Bush Theatre, London

Adrenalin...Heart is a two-hander play written by Georgia Fitch.

== Overview ==
A two character play about Leigh, a British, white, Catholic single mother with two children and a job in local government, and Angel, a black man that has done time at college and in jail and now deals drugs in Islington.
