= Two-hander =

Play, film, or television programme with only two main characters

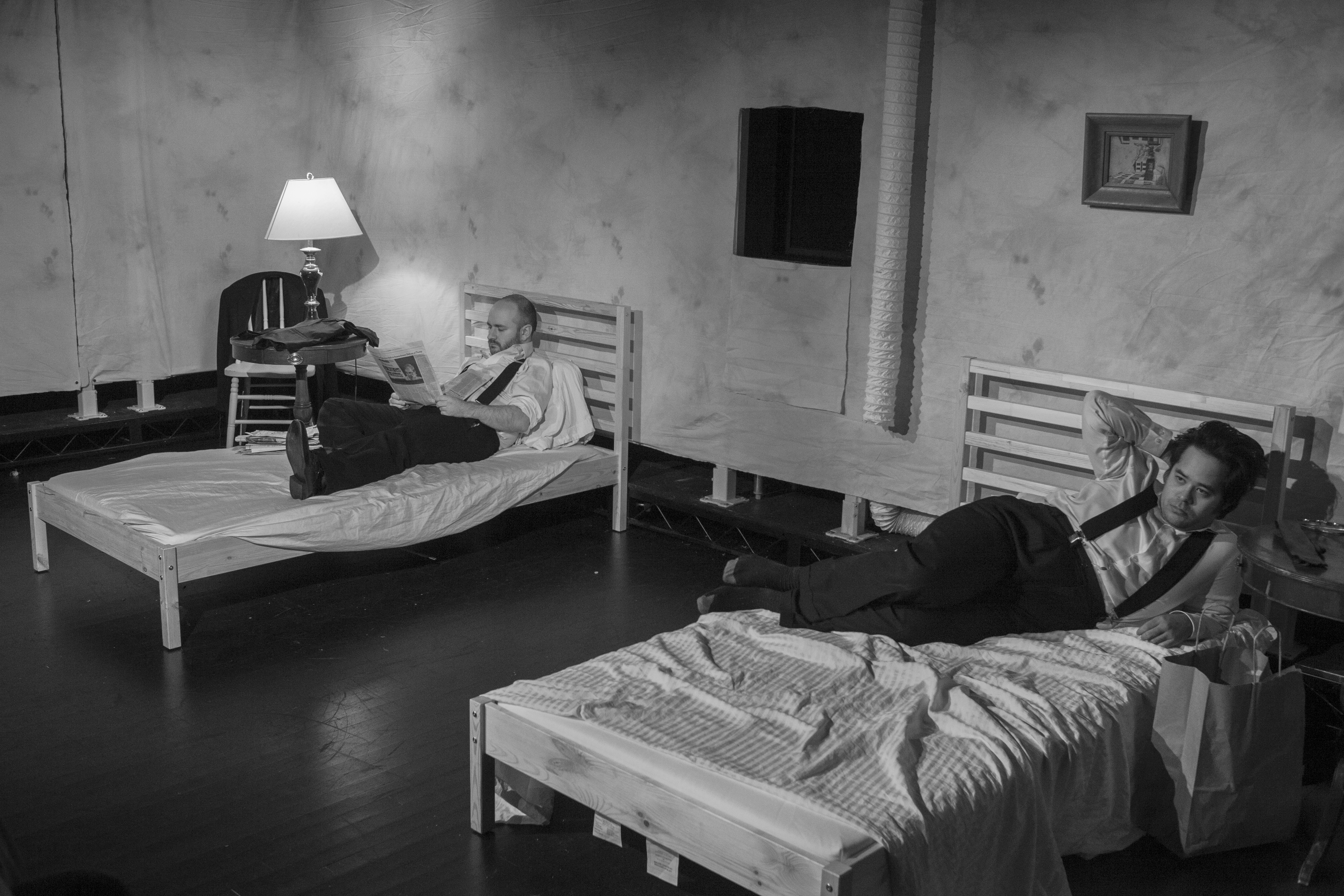
The two characters Ben and Gus in Harold Pinter's The Dumb Waiter

A two-hander is a play, film, or television programme with only two main characters. The two characters in question often display differences in social standing or experiences, differences that are explored and possibly overcome as the story unfolds. Instances of two-handers may include theatre, film, television episodes, television series, and radio.

== Radio ==
- The Bickersons
- Ethel and Albert consisted mostly of two-handers.
- John Finnemore's Double Acts
- Vic and Sade (Note: Began as a two-hander series and often returned to the format, after a third character was added, when one of the three took a day off.)

== Television series ==
- Dinner for One (1963) (Note: Originally a 1934 theater sketch, this 18-minute videotape of one performance is rebroadcast every Christmas or New Year's in parts of Europe.)
- Un gars, une fille (1997)
- Head Case (2007)
- Web Therapy (2008)
- In Treatment (2008)
- Roger & Val Have Just Got In (2010)

== Television episodes ==
- Bottom: "Contest", "Culture", "Hole"
- Breaking Bad: "Fly"
- Family Guy: "Brian & Stewie", "Send in Stewie, Please"
- Home and Away: Episode 6361
- Mad About You: "The Conversation"
- Marvel's Agents of S.H.I.E.L.D.: "4,722 Hours"
- Monsters: The Lyle and Erik Menendez Story: "The Hurt Man"
- Neighbours: Episode 8052, Episode 8325
- Porridge: "A Night In"
- The Twilight Zone: "Two"

== Theatre ==
- The Stronger (1889)
- Hughie (1942)
- The Fourposter (1951)
- Two for the Seesaw (1958)
- The Zoo Story (1959)
- The Dumb Waiter (1960)
- Happy Days (1961)
- The Blood Knot (1961)
- Dutchman (1966)
- I Do! I Do! (1966)
- Same Time, Next Year (1975)
- The Gin Game (1976)
- The Woods (1977)
- Talley's Folly (1980)
- Duet for One (1980, also filmed in 1986)
- Educating Rita (1980)
- Mass Appeal (1980)
- 'night, Mother (1982)
- The Woman in Black (1987)
- The Meeting (1987)
- Love Letters (1988)
- Frankie and Johnny in the Clair de Lune (1987)
- A Walk in the Woods (1988)
- The Secret of Sherlock Holmes (1988)
- Oleanna (1992)
- Lonely Planet (1993)
- John & Jen (1995)
- Stones in His Pockets (1996)
- The Blue Room (1998)
- Vincent River (2000)
- Six Dance Lessons in Six Weeks (2001)
- The Last Five Years (2001)
- Topdog/Underdog (2001)
- A Number (2002)
- Adrenalin...Heart (2002)
- Tuesdays with Morrie (2002)
- The Sunset Limited (2006)
- The Story of My Life (2009)
- A Steady Rain (2007)
- The Mountaintop (2009)
- Red (2009)
- Venus in Fur (2010)
- Lungs (2011)
- In a Forest, Dark and Deep (2011)
- Tender Napalm (2011)
- Constellations (2012)
- Between the Sheets (2012)
- The Anarchist (2012)
- China Doll (2015)
- Equal (2021)

== Opera ==
- Love Counts (2005)

== Film ==
- Heaven Knows, Mr Allison (1957)
- Dutchman (1966)
- Hell in the Pacific (1968)
- Sleuth (1972)
- Same Time, Next Year (1978)
- My Dinner with Andre (1981)
- Enemy Mine (1985)
- 'night, Mother (1985)
- The Caller (1987)
- Closet Land (1991)
- The Mozart Bird (1993)
- Oleanna (1994)
- Interview (2003)
- Before Sunset (2004)
- In Bed (2005)
- Conversations with Other Women (2005)
- Sleuth (2007)
- Interview (2007)
- Antichrist (2009)
- Moon (2009)
- The Sunset Limited (2011)
- 28 Hotel Rooms (2012)
- Some Velvet Morning (2013)
- Venus in Fur (2013)
- Creep (2014)
- Blue Jay (2016)
- The Pass (2016)
- Creep 2 (2017)
- Love All You Have Left (2017)
- Destination Wedding (2018)
- The Lighthouse (2019)
- The Two Popes (2019)
- Friend of the World (2020)
- Language Lessons (2021)
- Malcolm & Marie (2021)
- Together (2021)
- Biosphere (2022)
- Good Luck to You, Leo Grande (2022)
- 65 (2023)
- The Dive (2023)
- What Happens Later (2023)
- Daddio (2024)
- Blue Film (2025)
- Miss You, Love You (2026)
