= The Secret Daughter =

Australian television drama series

- Genre: Family drama Musical
- Written by: Justin Monjo; Greg Haddrick; Louise Bowes; Keith Thompson
- Directed by: Leah Purcell; Geoff Bennett; Paul Moloney
- Starring: Jessica Mauboy; David Field; Matt Levett; Jared Turner; Rachel Gordon; Jordan Hare; Bonnie Sveen; Renee Lim
- Country of origin: Australia
- Original language: English
- No. of seasons: 2
- No. of episodes: 12

Production
- Executive producers: Bob Campbell; Greg Haddrick; Rory Callaghan
- Producers: Kerrie Mainwaring; Karl Zwicky; Lauren Edwards
- Production locations: Sydney; Dungog NSW
- Running time: 46 minutes
- Production company: Screentime

Original release
- Network: Seven Network
- Release: 3 October 2016 – 29 November 2017

The Secret Daughter is an Australian television drama series which premiered on the Seven Network on 3 October 2016. The series is written by Justin Monjo, Greg Haddrick, Louise Bowes and Keith Thompson and directed by Leah Purcell, Geoff Bennett and Paul Moloney. The drama centres on part-time country pub singer Billie Carter (Jessica Mauboy), who has a chance meeting with a wealthy city hotelier and discovers information about her family and history. The second season premiered on 8 November 2017. On 17 December 2017, it was announced that The Secret Daughter would not return for a third season in 2018.

== Production ==
The series received a total of A$171,750 in funding from Screen NSW. Filming on the series took place in Sydney and regional New South Wales and wrapped in June 2016.

The Seven Network announced in 2016 that the series had been renewed and a second season would screen in 2017. Production began in May 2017 with James Sweeny and Rachael Maza joining the cast.

A distinguishing feature of the program was its musical aspect was performed almost entirely by Mauboy herself.

== Cast ==
=== Main ===
- Jessica Mauboy as Billie Carter
- David Field as Gus Carter
- Matt Levett as Jamie Norton
- Jared Turner as Chris Norton
- Rachel Gordon as Susan Norton
- Jordan Hare as Harriet Norton

=== Supporting ===
- Colin Friels as Jack Norton
- Salvatore Coco as Bruno Rossi
- Bonnie Sveen as Layla Chapple
- J.R. Reyne as Dan Delaney
- Libby Asciak as Rachel Rossi
- Johnny Boxer as Lloyd Dobson
- Terry Serio as Carmine
- Harriet Gordon-Anderson as Zoe Menkell
- Jeremy Ambrum as Shorty
- Amanda Muggleton as Connie Di Maria
- Renee Lim as Vivienne Hart
- Ryan O'Kane as Charlie Stryver
- Erin Holland as Della Jensen
- James Sweeny as Marc Laurent
- John Batchelor as Nick Mackay
- Mercia Deane-Johns as Poppy
- Michael Beckley as Jasper

== Series overview ==
Series	Episodes	Originally released	
Series	Episodes	First released	Last released
1	6	3 October 2016	7 November 2016
2	6	8 November 2017	29 November 2017

== Episodes ==
=== Season 1 (2016) ===
No. overall	No. in season	Title	Directed by	Written by	Original release date	Prod. code	Aus. viewers
1	1	"Flame Trees"	Leah Purcell	Justin Monjo	3 October 2016	271818-1	899,000
When she finds herself in hot water with the local people, Billie pretends to be the secret daughter of Jack Norton, a wealthy hotelier, in order to escape town, which suddenly lands her in the middle of a grieving family.
2	2	"Stuck in the Middle with You"	Leah Purcell	Justin Monjo	10 October 2016	271818-2	831,000
Billie finds herself in the middle of a grieving family, wondering whether she can keep up with her lie when she is given a DNA test to take.
3	3	"Where Do I Belong?"	Geoff Bennett	Greg Haddrick	17 October 2016	271818-3	862,000
Billie is shocked when she finds out that she is Jack Norton's daughter, she tries to find her place within her new family whilst she tries to reconcile with Gus when finding out he is not her real father.
4	4	"Lean on Me"	Geoff Bennett	Louise Bowes	24 October 2016	271818-4	836,000
Billie's best friend Layla arrives to give her support only to become increasingly close with Jamie; and Susan's hopes for a quiet Memorial for Jack are shattered when a news story outs Billie as Jack's real daughter.
5	5	"I Fought the Law"	Paul Moloney	Greg Haddrick	31 October 2016	271818-5	694,000
The preparations for the re-launch of Jack's Bar are overlooked by Billie's upcoming court appearance, as jail time becomes a likely outcome.
6	6	"Risk It"	Paul Moloney	Keith Thompson	7 November 2016	271818-6	795,000
After the headliner of the Jack's Bar re-launch pulls out, Billie is forced to step up, while dealing with the fact that she is not a member of the Norton family.

=== Season 2 (2017) ===
No. overall	No. in season	Title	Directed by	Written by	Original release date	Prod. code	Aus. viewers
7	1	"Always on My Mind"	Paul Moloney	Niki Aken & Jane Allen	8 November 2017	271818-7	512,000
8	2	"Respect"	Paul Moloney	Jessica Brookman	15 November 2017	271818-8	492,000
9	3	"Rear View Mirror"	Geoff Bennett	Eloise Healey	22 November 2017	271818-9	530,000
10	4	"Just Another Love Song"	Geoff Bennett	Vanessa Alexander	22 November 2017	271818-10	444,000
11	5	"Good Reasons"	Catriona McKenzie	Jane Allen	29 November 2017	271818-11	497,000
12	6	"Hearts on Fire"	Catriona McKenzie	Stuart Page	29 November 2017	271818-12	433,000

== Viewership ==
=== Season 1 (2016) ===
No.	Title	Air date	Overnight ratings		Consolidated ratings		Total viewers	Ref(s)
No.	Title	Air date	Viewers	Rank	Viewers	Rank	Total viewers	Ref(s)
1	"Flame Trees"	3 October 2016	899,000	7	193,000	5	1,091,000	
2	"Stuck in the Middle with You"	10 October 2016	831,000	8	215,000	2	1,046,000	
3	"Where Do I Belong?"	17 October 2016	862,000	7	209,000	4	1,071,000	
4	"Lean On Me"	24 October 2016	800,000	6	199,000	4	999,000	
5	"I Fought the Law"	31 October 2016	694,000	12	177,000	6	871,000	
6	"Risk It"	7 November 2016	795,000	5	162,000	3	957,000	

=== Season 2 (2017) ===
No.	Title	Air date	Overnight ratings		Consolidated ratings		Total viewers	Ref(s)
No.	Title	Air date	Viewers	Rank	Viewers	Rank	Total viewers	Ref(s)
1	"Always on my Mind"	8 November 2017	512,000	14	126,000	11	638,000	
2	"Respect"	15 November 2017	492,000	15	131,000	11	623,000	
3	"Rear View Mirror"	22 November 2017	530,000	13	118,000	10	648,000	
4	"Just Another Love Song"	22 November 2017	444,000	16	122,000	12	566,000	
5	"Good Reasons"	29 November 2017	497,000	13	114,000	12	611,000	
6	"Hearts on Fire"	29 November 2017	433,000	18	102,000	14	535,000	

== Music ==
The show's first soundtrack album, The Secret Daughter: Songs from the Original TV Series, was recorded by Jessica Mauboy and featured music used in the first season. It was released on 14 October 2016 by Sony Music Australia. The album became Mauboy's first number-one album and also made her the first Indigenous artist to reach number one on the ARIA Albums Chart. The second soundtrack album, The Secret Daughter Season Two: Songs from the Original 7 Series, was also recorded by Mauboy and released on 6 October 2017.
