= Thomas Wren (footballer) =

English footballer

Personal information
- Full name: Thomas James Wren
- Date of birth: 4 March 1907
- Place of birth: Rossington, England
- Date of death: 1973 (aged 65–66)
- Place of death: Lambeth, England
- Position: Left back

Senior career*
Years	Team	Apps	(Gls)
- Rossington Colliery
- Huddersfield Town
1928–1930	Bradford City	2	(0)
- Portsmouth
- Norwich City
- Bristol City
- Tunbridge Wells Rangers
- * Club domestic league appearances and goals

Thomas James Wren (4 March 1907 – 1973) was an English professional footballer who played as a left back.

== Career ==
Born in Rossington, Wren spent his early career with Rossington Colliery and Huddersfield Town. He signed for Bradford City from Huddersfield Town in December 1928. He made 2 league appearances for the club, before joining Portsmouth in June 1930. He later played for Norwich City, Bristol City and Tunbridge Wells Rangers. He died in Lambeth in 1973.

== Sources ==
- Frost, Terry (1988). Bradford City A Complete Record 1903-1988. Breedon Books Sport. ISBN 0-907969-38-0.
