= Bonnie Sveen =

Australian actress (born 1989)

- Born: 14 July 1989 (age 37); Hobart, Tasmania, Australia
- Occupation: Actress
- Years active: 2010–present
- Spouse: Nathan Gooley (m. 2023)
- Children: 2

Bonnie Sveen (born 14 July 1989) is an Australian actress. She began her acting career at the Huon Valley Theatre Company, before attending the National Institute of Dramatic Art. In 2010, Sveen starred in the multi-story drama film Before the Rain and made a guest appearance in the soap opera Home and Away. In 2012, Sveen appeared as the freed slave Chadara in Spartacus: Vengeance. Sveen also joined the main cast of Home and Away as Ricky Sharpe. For her portrayal of Ricky, Sveen won the Logie Award for Most Popular New Talent. Sveen appeared as Ricky in the 2015 spin-off Home and Away: An Eye for an Eye. The following year, she announced her departure from Home and Away, after she was cast in the Seven Network drama The Secret Daughter, alongside Jessica Mauboy.

== Early and personal life ==
Sveen was born in the Huon Valley, South Tasmania to a Canadian father, Rob, and Australian mother, Leanne Sveen. She has two brothers, one older and one younger. Sveen began her acting career at the Huon Valley Theatre Company. She attended Rosny College, before she moved to Sydney to attend the National Institute of Dramatic Art (NIDA). She is of Norwegian descent on her father's side.

Outside of acting, Sveen is also a painter. Sveen has been in a relationship with assistant director Nathan Gooley since 2015. In August 2018, Sveen announced that the couple were expecting identical twins in October. However, Sveen gave birth to the twin girls a month early. Sveen and Gooley announced their engagement in 2020, and they married on 11 March 2023 in Tasmania.

== Career ==
In 2010, Sveen starred as Violet in a chapter of the multi-story Australian film Before the Rain. The chapter, titled Violet, was written by Alice Bell and directed by Craig Boreham. Before the Rain was a co-production from NIDA and the Australian Film, Television and Radio School. In that same year, Sveen also made a guest appearance as Hayley Doven in two episodes of Home and Away. In 2013, Sveen appeared as Chadara in Spartacus: Vengeance.

Sveen auditioned for the role of Bianca Scott in Home and Away, before she was cast as Ricky Sharpe. Sveen told Tim Martain from The Mercury that she wanted the part "more than anything I've ever auditioned for." Ricky was introduced as a love interest for established character Darryl Braxton (Steve Peacocke). Sveen made her first appearance as Ricky on 2 April 2013. Sveen won the Logie Award for Most Popular New Talent for the role. Her acceptance speech was praised by the media and viewers after she spoke about positive body images and acknowledged Indigenous Australians as the original owners of the land where the Logies were held. In 2015, Sveen also starred in the spin-off episode Home and Away: An Eye for an Eye broadcast exclusively on the subscription service Presto.

In early April 2016, it was announced Sveen had joined the cast of The Secret Daughter alongside singer Jessica Mauboy, who encouraged producers to sign her for the show. Sveen plays the role of back-up singer Layla, while Mauboy plays Billie, a singer who goes to the city to pursue her music dreams, but finds out about her family's past at the same time. Sveen dyed her hair brunette for the role. A few days later, Sveen confirmed that she had left Home and Away. She posted a goodbye message on her social media account, stating "If someone had told me 10 years ago that I'd be playing a staunch, surfie chick in Summer Bay (and that it would bring me more joy than I could imagine) I wouldn't have believed them. Playing Ricky has shaped me for ever. I carry every bond that was forged and so many fond memories, into the new beginning."

Sveen appeared in Storm Ashwood's war drama film Escape and Evasion as journalist Rebecca in 2019. The following year, she guested in the comedy series Rosehaven, which is set and filmed in Sveen's home state of Tasmania. In October 2023, Sveen began filming a role in romantic comedy feature He Loves Me Not, alongside her fellow Home and Away co-stars Rhiannon Fish and Georgie Parker. She also joined the ensemble cast of the Stan comedy-drama Thou Shalt Not Steal as Cheryl, who Sveen described as a villain.

On 24 August 2025, Home and Away producers confirmed that Sveen and Peacocke would be reprising their roles as Ricky and Brax for a guest stint in 2026. The storyline revists their characters 10 years on, and will be filmed across Western Australia.

== Filmography ==
Television performances
Year	Title	Role	Notes
2010	Home and Away	Hayley Doven	Guest role
2012	Spartacus: Vengeance	Chadara	4 episodes
2013–2016, 2026	Home and Away	Ricky Sharpe	Main cast, Guest
2015	Home and Away: An Eye for an Eye	Ricky Sharpe	TV movie
2016–2017	The Secret Daughter	Layla Chapple	12 episodes
2020	Rosehaven	Jacquelyn	Episode: 4.4
2024	Thou Shalt Not Steal	Cheryl	2 episodes

Film performances
Year	Title	Role	Notes
2010	Violet	Violet	Short
2010	Before the Rain	Violet	
2019	Escape and Evasion	Rebecca	
2023	Finding Addison	Jewel	Short

== Awards and nominations ==
Year	Award	Category	Work	Result	Ref.
2014	Inside Soap Awards	Best Daytime Star	Home and Away	Nominated	
2014	Logie Awards	Most Popular New Talent	Home and Away	Won	
2015	Inside Soap Awards	Best Daytime Star	Home and Away	Nominated	
2015	Logie Awards	Most Popular Actress	Home and Away	Nominated	
2016	Logie Awards	Most Popular Actress	Home and Away	Nominated	
