= Steve Peacocke =

Australian actor (born 1981)

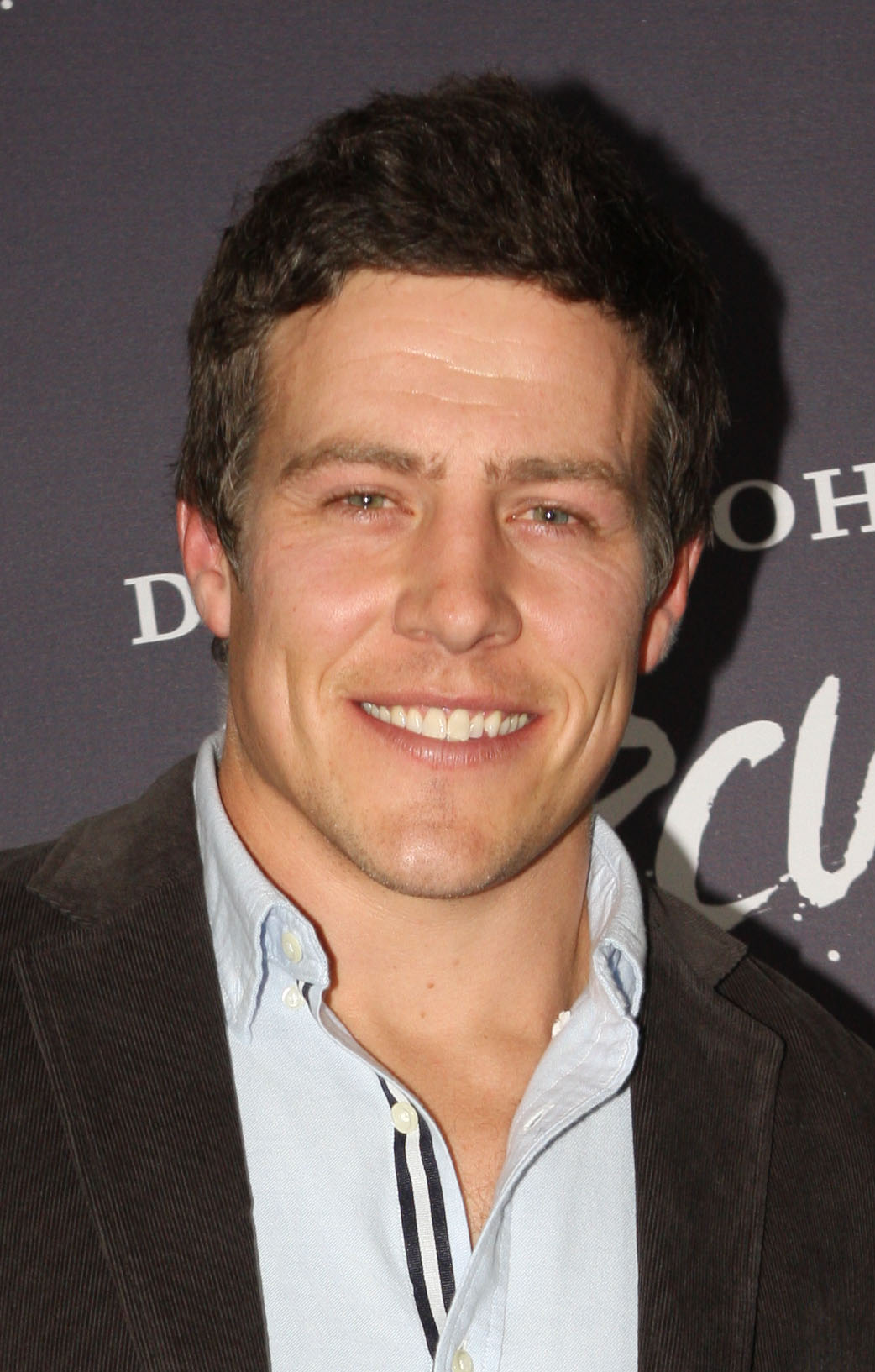
- Peacocke at the Hercules premiere in Sydney, June 2014
- Born: Stephen Peacocke; 30 October 1981 (age 45); Dubbo, New South Wales, Australia
- Occupation: Actor
- Years active: 2006–2026
- Spouse: Bridgette Sneddon (m. 2014)
- Children: 1

Stephen Peacocke (born 30 October 1981) is an Australian actor, who has appeared in theatre productions and portrayed minor roles in television dramas and films, including Suburban Mayhem and All Saints. Peacocke rose to prominence for his portrayal as Darryl Braxton on the television soap opera Home and Away, (2011–2016,2026). For his role, he won the Logie Award for Most Popular Actor on two occasions and is regarded as one of the show's most popular characters.

Following Peacocke's departure from Home and Away, he went on to have minor roles in the box office films Hercules (2014), Whiskey Tango Foxtrot (2016), and Me Before You (2016). He has starred as Detective Josh Levine in the Australia drama series Wanted and of 2023, stars in the Network Ten drama series Five Bedrooms, Seven Network's RFDS: Royal Flying Doctor Service and the ABC drama series The Newsreader.

== Early life ==
Peacocke was born in Dubbo, New South Wales to Gareth Peacocke, a former accountant, and his wife Sylvia. He has a brother, who encouraged him to pursue acting. Peacocke attended schools in South Dubbo before finishing his secondary education at a Bathurst boarding school. He went on to study communications at the University of Newcastle and took a drama class taught by Glenn Hazeldine, who also encouraged him to take up acting. Peacocke worked numerous labouring jobs in his twenties while trying to start his acting career, including unloading freight trucks and working as a jackaroo for $3 an hour. Peacocke played rugby for the Dubbo Kangaroos, but various injuries led him to theatre work instead. In 2004, Peacocke won a City of Newcastle Drama Award for playing Ricko in a production of A Property of the Clan. He moved to Sydney in order to pursue his acting career and he lived in a share house in Stanmore, where he struggled to make rent before he was cast in Home and Away.

== Career ==
Peacocke appeared in the short play festival Brand Spanking New with actress Bel Deliá, in playwright/director Augusta Supple's work Interrupting Grace directed by Nick Curnow, and also on Supple's later venture Stories from the 428. He also had a role in Kit Brookman's It Was Raining All Afternoon.

Peacocke began his screen acting career in 2006 when he appeared in a small role in the Australian film Suburban Mayhem. He started appearing on television in 2007, when he played the role of Zeb Hall in the medical drama series All Saints. His other television credits include episodes of Packed to the Rafters, Rake, and East West 101. He also appeared in the television film Emerald Falls in 2008, which starred Georgie Parker. Peacocke played a role in a parody of Rihanna's "Umbrella" music video called "Drifting in my cappella" with 1BUCK80. Peacocke appears in the 2011 feature film Burning Man, with Matthew Goode and Bojana Novakovic.

In early 2011, Peacocke received the role of Darryl "Brax" Braxton, a local River Boy, on the Australian soap opera Home and Away. Peacocke also revealed his plans to work in the United States in the future. In 2012, Peacocke won the Logie Award for Most Popular New Male Talent. The following year, he won the Most Popular Actor award. He also received a nomination for the Gold Logie Award for Most Popular Personality on Australian Television. Peacocke announced his departure from Home and Away in February 2015. He filmed his final scenes in late 2014 and he made his last on-screen appearance 10 June 2015. Two months later, Peacocke returned to Home and Away to shoot scenes for a storyline which aired in late 2015.

Peacocke appears as Nic in Whiskey Tango Foxtrot, an adaptation of Kim Barker's memoir The Taliban Shuffle. He also appears in the adaptation of Me Before You as Nathan, opposite Emilia Clarke and Sam Claflin. Peacocke then starred as Detective Josh Levine in the 2016 Australian television series Wanted. He also appeared in the comedy film Cooped Up.

Peacocke began starring alongside Kat Stewart and Hugh Sheridan in Network Ten's 2019 drama series Five Bedrooms, which focuses on five people who buy a house together after meeting at a wedding. The series was renewed for a second season, which began airing in August 2021, after a production delay due to the COVID-19 pandemic. After starring in war film Danger Close: The Battle of Long Tan, Peacocke joined the cast of comedy drama Squinters for its second season, and appeared in the drama Les Norton.

Peacocke starred in the Nine Network miniseries Informer 3838 as Detective Paul Dale, who heads up the Victorian Police drug squad, until he is wrongfully arrested and imprisoned. Peacocke plays flight nurse Pete Emerson in the 2021 drama series RFDS: Royal Flying Doctor Service. He carried out his own research to prepare for the role, including talking with people who worked with the Flying Doctor Service and training with a nurse. Peacocke also stars in the ABC drama series The Newsreader, which is set in a 1986 television newsroom. For his performance as sports reporter Rob Rickards, Peacocke earned an AACTA Award nomination for Best Guest or Supporting Actor in a Television Drama.

In February 2023, it was announced that Peacocke had joined the cast of Nine's crime drama Human Error, alongside Leeanna Walsman and Rahel Romahn. Production on the six-part series began that same month in Melbourne. Peacocke plays Detective Dylan Mackenzie. He also appears in the 2024 ANZAC war epic film Before Dawn.

On 24 August 2025, Home and Away producers confirmed that Peacocke and Bonnie Sveen, who played his on-screen partner Ricky Sharpe, would be returning for a guest stint in 2026, as part of a storyline revisiting their characters 10 years later. Scenes were filmed across Western Australia in October. Peacocke made a guest appearance in the third season of NCIS: Sydney. Peacocke's Home and Away return began airing in March 2026. That same month it was announced that Peacocke had been cast alongside Sheridan Smith in the British-Australian thriller series Two Birds, which is set and filmed in Western Australia. It is a co-production between British broadcaster ITV and Australian streaming service Stan.

== Personal life ==
Peacocke has been in a relationship with actress Bridgette Sneddon since 2005. The couple met at the University of Western Sydney. The couple announced their engagement on 7 March 2014 and married on the 24 December 2014 in a private ceremony. In 2023, it emerged that Peacocke and Sneddon have a daughter.

== Filmography ==
=== Film ===
Year	Title	Role	Notes
2006	Suburban Mayhem	Store Attendant	
2008	Cue Howard	Sir William Delamere	Short film
2010	The Black Dog	Steven	Short film
2010	The Robbery	Interrogator	Short film
2011	Burning Man	Paramedic	
2014	Hercules	Stephanos	
2016	Whiskey Tango Foxtrot	Nic	
2016	Me Before You	Nathan	
2016	Cooped Up	Mike	
2019	Danger Close: The Battle of Long Tan	Lieutenant Adrian Roberts	
2024	Before Dawn	Corporal Beale	
2027	Chiquita		Feature Film

=== Television ===
Year	Title	Role	Notes
2007	All Saints	Zeb Hall	Episode: "Balancing Act"
2008	Emerald Falls	Bushwalker	Television film
2009	Packed to the Rafters	Waiter	Episode: "Belonging"
2010	Rake	Michael Warner	Episode: "R v Mark"
2011	Telethon	Himself	Episode: 15 October 2011
2011–2016, 2026	Home and Away	Darryl "Brax" Braxton	Main cast, Guest (2026)
2016–2017	Wanted	Detective Josh Levine	Main cast
2019–2023	Five Bedrooms	Ben Chigwell	Main cast
2019	Squinters	Brett	6 episodes
2019	Les Norton	Murray "Muzza" Norton	3 episodes
2020	Informer 3838	Paul Dale	Miniseries: 2 episodes
2021–present	RFDS	Pete Emerson	Main cast
2021–2025	The Newsreader	Rob Rickards	Main cast
2024	Human Error	Dylan Mackenzie	Main cast
2025	NCIS: Sydney	Karl Drysdale	Episode: "The Truth is Outback"
2026	Shakedown	Greg Miller	TV mini series
TBA	Two Birds	Matt	

== Awards and nominations ==
Year	Award	Category	Work	Result	Ref(s)
2012	Inside Soap Awards	Best Daytime Star	Home and Away	Nominated	
2012	Logie Awards	Most Popular New Male Talent	Home and Away	Won	
2013	Inside Soap Awards	Best Daytime Star	Home and Away	Won	
2013	Logie Awards	Most Popular Personality on Australian Television	Home and Away	Nominated	
2013	Logie Awards	Most Popular Actor	Home and Away	Won	
2014	Logie Awards	Most Popular Personality on Australian Television	Home and Away	Nominated	
2014	Logie Awards	Most Popular Actor	Home and Away	Nominated	
2015	Logie Awards	Most Popular Personality on Australian Television	Home and Away	Nominated	
2015	Logie Awards	Most Popular Actor	Home and Away	Won	
2016	Logie Awards	Most Popular Actor	Home and Away	Nominated	
2021	AACTA Awards	Best Guest or Supporting Actor in a Television Drama	The Newsreader	Nominated	
2022	Logie Awards	Most Popular Actor	RFDS	Nominated	
2026	Logie Awards	Best Lead Actor in a Drama	RFDS	Pending	
