= Home and Away: All or Nothing =

- Genre: Soap opera Drama
- Written by: Louise Bowes
- Directed by: Arnie Custo
- Starring: Dan Ewing; Lisa Gormley; George Mason; Nic Westaway; Kyle Pryor; Lynne McGranger; Alea O'Shea; Diarmid Heidenreich; Samantha Jade
- Composer: Michael Yezerski
- Country of origin: Australia
- Original language: English

Production
- Executive producers: John Holmes; Julie McGauran
- Producer: Lucy Addario
- Cinematography: Bob Miller
- Editor: Stafford Jackson Wales
- Running time: 60 minutes
- Production company: Seven Productions

Original release
- Network: Foxtel on Demand; Foxtel Play; Presto
- Release: 26 January 2017

Related
- Home and Away; Home and Away: An Eye for an Eye; Home and Away: Revenge

Home and Away: All or Nothing is a television film and spin-off of the Australian soap opera Home and Away. It was written by Louise Bowes and directed by Arnie Custo. All or Nothing premiered on 26 January 2017 (Australia Day) on Foxtel on Demand, Foxtel Play and Presto. It was commissioned along with Home and Away: Revenge following the success of the 2015 telefilm Home and Away: An Eye for an Eye, which broke Presto streaming records. All or Nothing is a sequel to Revenge and like the previous specials it features current and returning Home and Away cast members.

The plot sees Trevor Gunson (Diarmid Heidenreich) instigate a prison riot, as he tries to kill Kyle Braxton (Nic Westaway) and his brother Heath Braxton (Dan Ewing), who is visiting along with his wife Bianca Scott (Lisa Gormley). Ewing said the plot was about survival and he found it to be darker than regular episodes of Home and Away. All or Nothing was shot on-location at Maitland Gaol and Parramatta Correctional Centre, a setting that Ewing described as claustrophobic. The special received a positive response from critics, and Colin Vickery of The Daily Telegraph dubbed it "the bloodiest episode ever seen of the hit Aussie soapie".

== Plot ==
Kyle Braxton, who is serving a thirteen year prison sentence, is suddenly moved to the Protection Unit because the Braxton family's enemy Trevor "Gunno" Gunson has returned to the prison. Kyle receives a visit from his brother Heath Braxton and his wife Bianca Scott. They explain how Gunno recently kidnapped Bianca and held her hostage. Prison inmate Bandit informs Gunno that Heath and Bianca are visiting Kyle, and Gunno instigates a riot in order to send the prison into lockdown. Gunno and Bandit break into the security command centre, while the prisoners from the protection unit are attacked. Kyle drags Prison Guard Mayhew out of harm's way after he is injured. As Heath and Bianca are being escorted towards an exit, Gunno takes over the PA system and tells the inmates to bring them and Kyle to him. Realising they cannot leave, Heath and Bianca hide in a ceiling crawlspace.

In Summer Bay, Heath's daughter Darcy watches a news broadcast about the riot, but Irene Roberts tells her that it is occurring at a different prison. Irene calls Nate Cooper and Martin "Ash" Ashford, who agrees to go to the prison and find Heath and Bianca. Mayhew wakes up and Kyle asks him for his keys, so he can get them out. Prisoner Frank uses Mayhew's radio to tell Gunno where Kyle is. Gunno opens all the doors, allowing the prisoners from general population to enter the protection unit. Kyle and Mayhew escape to the laundry room. Meanwhile, Ash and Nate go to the back of the prison, where Ash gets inside through a secret entrance that Gunno used for drug trafficking. Heath and Bianca are forced out of the crawlspace when it fills with smoke and Ash finds them. He guides them to the exit, but Heath realises he cannot leave Kyle behind and tells Ash to get Bianca out.

Bianca begs Ash to go back for Heath and she collapses in Nate's arms, before telling him she is pregnant. Gunno sees Kyle on a security camera and he goes to the armoury to get a gun. Heath changes into a prison uniform to blend in, and Ash catches up with him. Gunno shoots Kyle and leaves him for dead. As Irene watches the news, Darcy realises that she lied to her. Irene assures her that Heath will protect Bianca. Heath calls Bianca to say goodbye in case he does not make it out. Isla Schultz, the woman Kyle went to prison for, recognises Bianca and introduces herself. Isla wants to let Kyle know that she still loves him. Ash and Heath find Kyle and stem his bleeding, before Heath helps him to the exit. He encourages Kyle not to give up when Kyle wonders what he has to live for, as Isla has not visited in months. Heath gets Kyle outside, where he is handcuffed and Kyle is put into an ambulance.

Gunno puts on a guard's uniform, but Ash notices him and gives chase. Gunno tries to shoot him, but misses. Mayhew alerts Ash to Gunno's hiding place in the laundry room. Gunno tries to shoot Ash again, but the gun fails to fire and they fight. Ash pushes Gunno backwards and impales him on a clothes hook, killing him. Mayhew tells Ash that he will take the blame for Gunno's death. Heath and Bianca call Darcy to let her know that they are okay. Kyle and Isla reunite and she admits that she stayed away because she felt guilty. Kyle tells her that he does not blame her, but he needs to know if they have a future and Isla kisses him. Mayhew tells the waiting journalist that he is responsible for the death of an inmate, and that he wants to recommend that Kyle has his sentence reduced for saving his life. Later that night, Bianca finally tells Heath she is pregnant.

== Cast ==
(In order of appearance)

- Diarmid Heidenreich as Trevor Gunson
- Nic Westaway as Kyle Braxton
- Justin Stewart Cotta as Prison Guard Mayhew
- Peter Callan as Prisoner Frank
- Benjamin Hoetjes as Bandit
- Lisa Gormley as Bianca Scott
- Dan Ewing as Heath Braxton
- Alea O'Shea as Darcy Callahan
- Lynne McGranger as Irene Roberts
- Kyle Pryor as Nate Cooper
- Sandy Winton as Prison Guard Richardson
- Lauren Clair as Sergeant Emily Larsen
- Chantelle Jamieson as Journalist
- George Mason as Martin Ashford
- Aaron Scully as Stan
- Samantha Jade as Isla Schultz
- Oliver Cooney as Paramedic

== Production ==
=== Conception and development ===
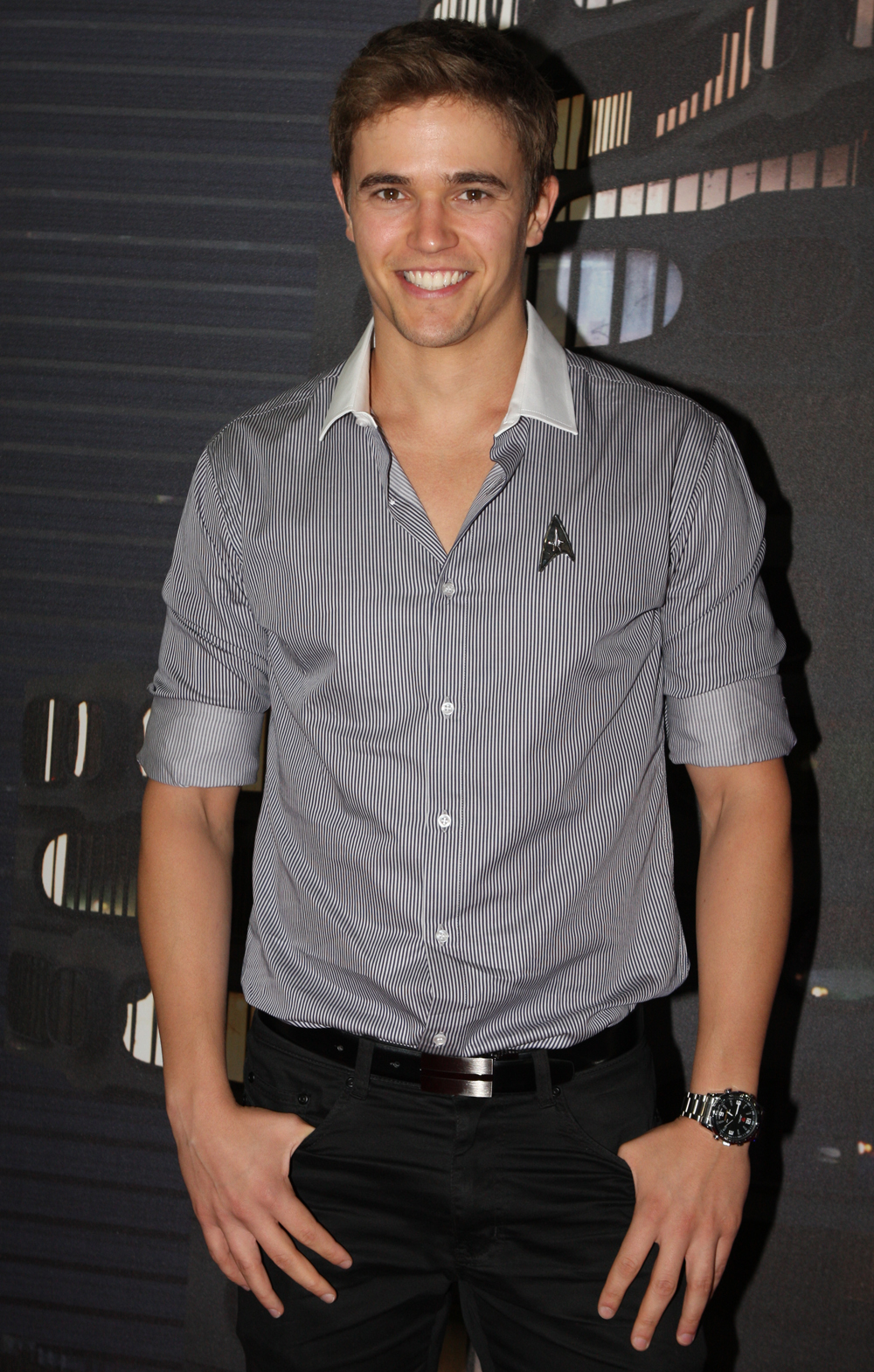
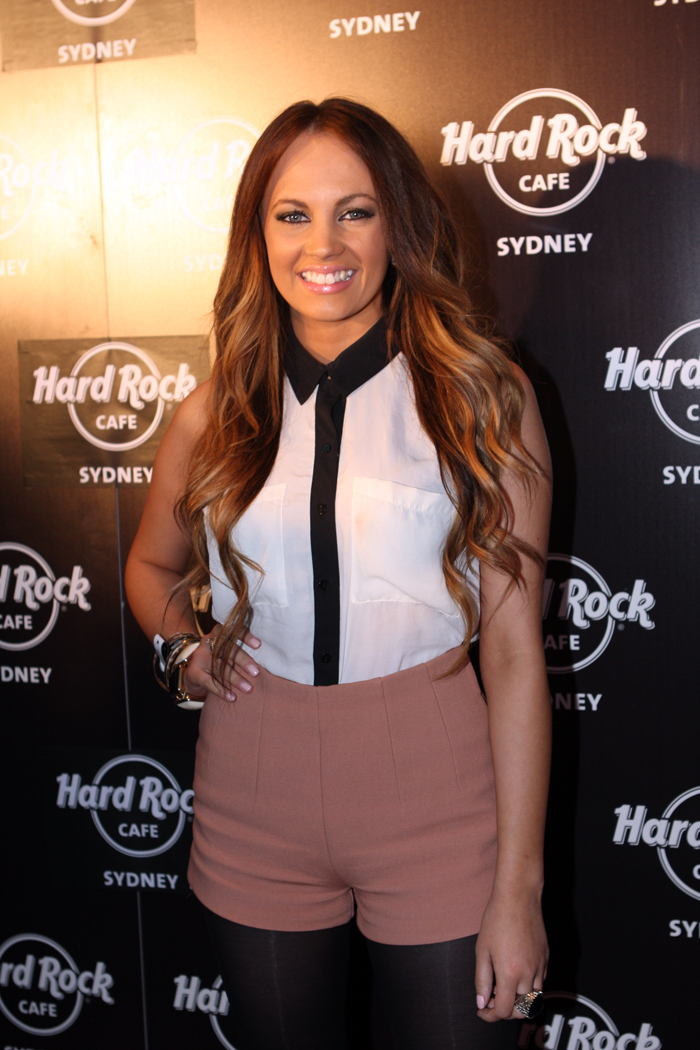
Nic Westaway (left) and Samantha Jade (right) reprised their roles of Kyle Braxton and Isla Schultz respectively.

Following the success of Home and Away: An Eye for an Eye, which broke Presto streaming records when it aired in 2015, Tiffany Dunk of The Daily Telegraph reported that the company were looking to create further spin-offs. All or Nothing was commissioned along with Home and Away: Revenge in May 2016. A reporter for MediaWeek said scripts were in development and production would begin during the coming months, with the first spin-off airing later that year. Both Revenge and All or Nothing were scheduled for broadcast during the summer, while the main show was off the air.

The producers took advantage of the fact that the telefilm was not airing in Home and Away's "family-friendly" time slot, and created "a much more brutal storyline." All or Nothing picks up immediately from where Revenge ended, with Trevor "Gunno" Gunson (Diarmid Heidenreich) returning to prison. When he learns that Heath Braxton (Dan Ewing) and Bianca Scott (Lisa Gormley) are visiting Kyle Braxton (Nic Westaway), Gunno seizes the opportunity to exact his revenge on Braxton family by starting a riot, so he can kill Heath and Kyle.

Ewing said the plot was about survival and was more "claustrophobic" than the settings for An Eye for An Eye and Revenge. He also said the feel of the special was much different and described it as "Home and Away meets Die Hard. The actor later stated, "It is a lot darker (than normal Home and Away). There are no walk and talks on the beach. It is a very different beast." The final scenes of All or Nothing featuring Bianca telling Heath about her pregnancy began a new storyline arc for the couple during their guest stint in the main show.

=== Casting and filming ===
As with the previous specials, All or Nothing features both current and returning Home and Away cast members. In November 2016, it was confirmed that actors Dan Ewing and Lisa Gormley would be reprising their roles of Heath Braxton and Bianca Scott for both Revenge and All or Nothing. Nic Westaway and Samantha Jade reprised their roles as Kyle Braxton and his love interest Isla Schultz following their 2016 departures. Home and Away cast members Lynne McGranger (Irene Roberts), Kyle Pryor (Nate Cooper) and George Mason (Martin "Ash" Ashford) also joined the production.

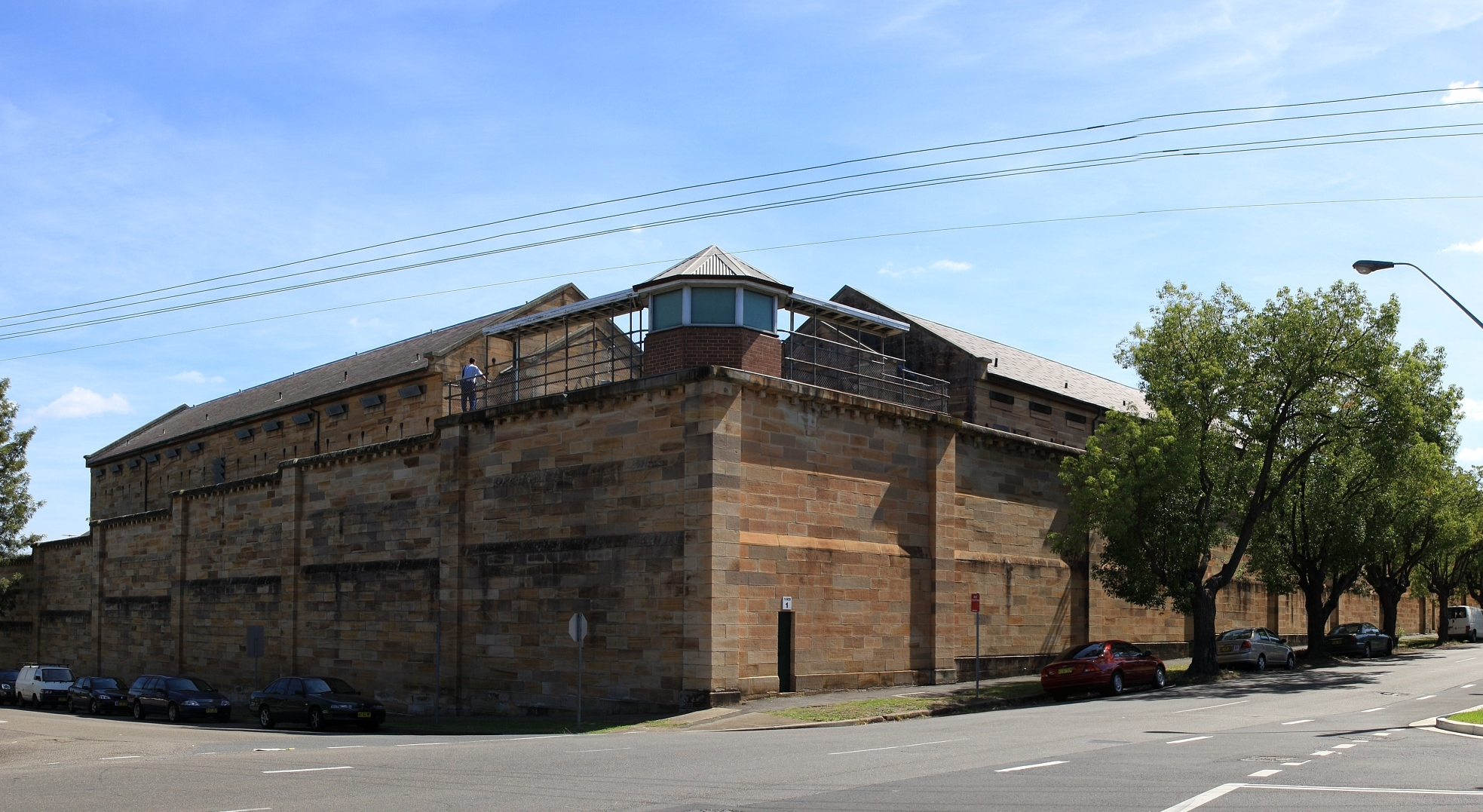
Some scenes were filmed at Parramatta Correctional Centre.

Jade told Stephen Downie of TV Week that she was "thrilled" about returning to her role, adding that it was similar to coming back to a family. She said her character feels bad that she had not visited Kyle enough, considering he took the rap for her crime, which sent him to the prison. Westaway enjoyed working alongside Jade again and he also stated, "It's good to see the cast and the crew. I haven't been away for very long, but it feels like a lot longer." A call for male extras to appear as prison inmates and guards went out in August 2016. The extras also included former inmates from the correctional facility that they filmed at.

All or Nothing was produced by Seven Productions. It was mostly shot at the decommissioned Maitland Gaol and Parramatta Correctional Centre in August 2016. Ewing found filming in the locations to be "very surreal and eerie", as he was aware of the many negative things that had previously occurred there. He said "the claustrophobic feel was incredible. Some of the crew who had been on the show for a long time were getting spooked out." While filming at Parramatta, the locations crew had to send letters out to the surrounding homes informing residents that they may hear gunfire. The crew also had to inform the local police force in case they were called to the scene.

== Broadcast ==
Home and Away: All or Nothing was released on Foxtel Play and Foxtel on Demand on Australia Day, 26 January 2017. It was also available to Presto subscribers shortly before the service was closed. All or Nothing was broadcast in the United Kingdom on digital station 5Star on 14 March in a 95-minute timeslot. The spin-off was broadcast as three 30-minute episodes on RTÉ2 in Ireland from 20–22 March 2017.

== Reception ==
In its UK broadcast on 5Star, All or Nothing was seen by 304,000 viewers, making it the seventh most-watched show on the channel for that week.

Ahead of its broadcast, Rachel Gavin of TV Soap predicted the special would be "just as incredible if not more so than Revenge, while Helena Cartwright of Digital Spy said it could be "the most violent episode we've seen yet". A writer for Woman's Day New Zealand included the telefilm in their "Best of the Box" feature. They wrote, "The latest chapter in this dark and gritty spin-off of the hit soap will test the emotional, physical and moral strength of everyone involved on trial."

The Daily Telegraph's Colin Vickery branded the spin-off "the bloodiest episode ever seen of the hit Aussie soapie", and stated it was "much more Prison Break or Wentworth than surf and sand in Summer Bay." Vickery also likened a fight scene to one from a Quentin Tarantino film. Jeremy Helligar of The Fix commented, "When we think of Home and Away, blazing guns isn't generally the first thing that comes to mind. That's all about to change…for at least one episode."

Brad Newsome of The Sydney Morning Herald liked All or Nothing more than Revenge, despite calling the plot "preposterous". He went on to praise director Arnie Custo and cinematographer Bob Miller's use of the setting "to great effect in some very menacing and kinetic scenes", as well as composer Michael Yezerski's "terrific" score. Newsome also enjoyed Heidenreich, Hoetjes, Callan's performances, believing that the latter two should have had bigger roles. He added, "Silly and melodramatic as the story is, it should keep you hooked right up to the shocking climax."
