= Phoebe Nicholson =

Fictional character

- Home and Away character
- Portrayed by: Isabella Giovinazzo
- Duration: 2013–2017
- First appearance: 26 November 2013
- Last appearance: 11 May 2017
- Introduced by: Lucy Addario
- Spin-off appearances: Home and Away: An Eye for an Eye (2015)
In-universe information
- Occupation: Musician; Waitress; Music tutor
- Father: Mark Nicholson

Phoebe Nicholson is a fictional character from the Australian soap opera Home and Away, played by Isabella Giovinazzo. The actress auditioned for the role in Sydney and relocated to the city after winning the role. Her casting was announced a few days before her first appearance. The part of Phoebe marks Giovinazzo's first acting job and she commented that she was having fun developing her character. She made her first screen appearance during the episode broadcast on 26 November 2013.

Phoebe is portrayed as a feisty, strong, positive, singer and songwriter from Melbourne. Phoebe was introduced in the 2013 finale, as the former girlfriend of established character Kyle Braxton. Actor Nic Westaway was pleased that his character was getting a new love interest, while series producer Lucy Addario believed Phoebe would bring out a different side to him. Phoebe and Kyle's relationship was tested by the appearance of his "dark side", Mark Nicholson's (Steve Rodgers) attempts to break them up and a marriage proposal.

Phoebe's burgeoning music career was brought to the forefront of storylines in November 2014 when Jolene Anderson joined the cast as Neive Devlin, a record producer who signs Phoebe to her label. At Phoebe's industry launch night, Neive had her assistant drug Phoebe and assault her on camera. Giovinazzo enjoyed portraying Phoebe's foray into the music industry. Shortly after, Phoebe became the focus of a darker storyline involving her fan Ryan Kelly (Daniel Webber), who stalked and kidnapped her. Phoebe was later paired with a new love interest, Martin "Ash" Ashford (George Mason), and learned she was pregnant with Kyle's twins, which she later miscarried. Following the end of her relationship with Ash, Phoebe was given a more mature love interest in the form of Justin Morgan (James Stewart). The couple became engaged, but ended their relationship when Phoebe left to tour the United States on 11 May 2017.

== Casting ==
On 24 November 2013, Meg Drewett from Digital Spy reported that actress Isabella Giovinazzo had joined the cast of Home and Away as new character Phoebe Nicholson. Giovinazzo successfully auditioned for the role in Sydney, where the show is filmed. Giovinazzo had to sing in front of actor Nic Westaway during the audition, before they were paired together to do some slow-dancing. Giovinazzo relocated to Sydney from Melbourne. She spent five months on the set filming, before her casting was announced. She admitted to having difficulty keeping her new role a secret, saying "I wasn't able to really tell anyone back home about it or why I moved (to Sydney). But it's nice now being able to share exactly why I disappeared for a few months."

The part marks Giovinazzo's first acting job, following a career in film making. Of joining Home and Away, Giovinazzo stated "It's been a lot of fun. I'm still figuring out what to do. Phoebe's been a really great person to start with. Just developing her character and rounding this woman has been wonderful and I've got a lot to play with because she's a little bit kooky." Giovinazzo admitted that she was nervous ahead of filming her first scene in front of hundreds of extras. Actress Jessica Grace Smith also auditioned for the role of Phoebe. She was later cast as Denny Miller. In October 2014, Giovinazzo admitted that she was attending acting classes to help her with emotional scenes, after she had difficulty acting out Phoebe's vulnerable moments.

== Development ==
=== Introduction and characterisation ===
Phoebe is a bright, attractive and boundlessly energetic young woman who arrives in the Bay (without announcement or preamble) when she hears that Kyle Braxton (who she knew as Kyle Bennett) is putting together a music festival.

— An excerpt from Phoebe's profile on the official Home and Away website.

Phoebe was introduced in the 2013 finale, as the ex-girlfriend of Kyle Braxton (Nic Westaway). She is a singer and songwriter, who grew up with Kyle in Melbourne and was "brokenhearted" when he moved away. Phoebe came to Summer Bay after learning Kyle was staging a music festival in the area. Giovinazzo explained that the festival gave Phoebe an opportunity to see Kyle for the first time since he left her. She wanted to see if there was anything still between them as they had a long-term relationship that was important to them both. Giovinazzo said, "Kyle and Phoebe know each other inside out. They just click together." Phoebe offered to help Kyle and Tamara Kingsley (Kelly Paterniti) plan the event and perform with the band. During Phoebe's performance, Kyle joined her on stage for a duet, which made Tamara jealous. Phoebe also caught Chris Harrington's (Johnny Ruffo) attention.

Ahead of her arrival, Giovinazzo called Phoebe a positive person, who liked to have fun. She explained, "she's a blast. She's this sort of blend of blunt, cool-cat, serious kid and a burst of erratic energy." Giovinazzo later branded the character "impulsive" and "mischievous" and said she had a feistiness about her. While the official website dubbed her "strong and focussed", adding that if she wants something she will go after it. Giovinazzo agreed, saying that Phoebe likes getting what she wants. Giovinazzo enjoys portraying Phoebe's fun side, as it gives her a chance to see "joy in everything". She also admitted to sharing some similarities with her character; they were both born in Melbourne and they like music. But Giovinazzo said that she was not "an avid musician" like Phoebe. Giovinazzo added that unlike Phoebe, she was not a trained singer and she just sang when she was told to.

The actress stated that she shared a lot of similarities with Phoebe, including her positive, outgoing and creative sides. Giovinazzo also said Phoebe was "very outspoken and very adventurous". In March 2016, Giovinazzo told Colin Vickery of news.com.au that due to everything Phoebe had gone through during her time in the Bay, she had changed and had become more grown up. Giovinazzo commented, "she has moved on from wanting to be a pop star and she is teaching now."

=== Relationship with Kyle Braxton ===
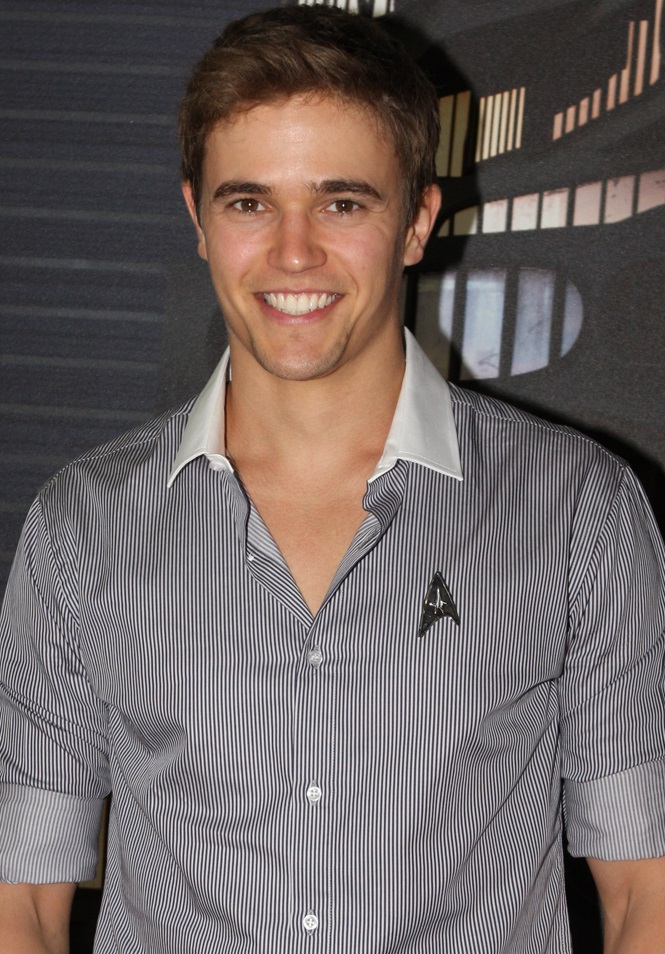
Nic Westaway plays Kyle Braxton, Phoebe's first love interest in the show.

Westaway was pleased that his character would be embarking on a new relationship, after being involved in a love triangle with Tamara and his brother Casey (Lincoln Younes). Westaway commented that Phoebe and Kyle had a strong connection while they lived in Melbourne and noted that there was "still a real spark" between them. He thought they would have to get on the same page, as Phoebe made Kyle question who he wanted to be. Series producer Lucy Addario believed Phoebe would bring out a different side to "the brooding" Kyle and mix up life in the Braxton world. Addario agreed with Westaway's assessment of Kyle and Phoebe's relationship, saying they would have to work out some issues from their past, but they would "quickly reignite the spark they shared." She added that the couple "sizzle" on-screen.

When Phoebe became disturbed by Kyle's "dark side" and his involvement with various Braxton dramas, she wanted him to tell her how he turned into such a violent person. Kyle opened up to her about how he kidnapped Casey and tried to kill him and Tamara, which left Phoebe scared. While Kyle felt like he had put that incident behind him with the help of his brothers, Phoebe did not understand. She then told Kyle that she was moving back to Melbourne and that she wanted him to come with her, believing that if he was away from his family he would like his old self again. Westaway told an Inside Soap reporter that Kyle wanted to be with Phoebe, as she brought out his passionate side which he missed. Phoebe reminded him of how he used to be. Kyle and Phoebe declared their love for each other, but Phoebe admitted that she no longer wanted to be around his brothers.

After Phoebe decided to stay in Summer Bay with Kyle, her father Mark Nicholson (Steve Rodgers) came to meet him. Westaway explained that Kyle could see how much it meant to Phoebe that they got along. The meeting went well, until Mark learned some interesting information about Kyle and changed his outlook "pretty quickly". Westaway hoped it would not cause a rift between Kyle and Phoebe, as she was a good influence on him. Mark later offered Kyle a bribe to stop dating his daughter, but Kyle refused to take the money, insisting that it was an insult as Phoebe was worth more. Mark then upped his offer to $100,000, but Kyle refused the money again. In a bid to keep Phoebe away from the Braxtons, Mark then reported the family for "dodgy dealings" to the police. After the police came away empty handed, someone fired a gun into the house, almost hitting Darryl Braxton (Steve Peacocke) and Ricky Sharpe (Bonnie Sveen). Peacocke commented that Brax was aware that Mark had connections to the underworld and wanted to keep Phoebe away from Kyle.

After the shooting, Kyle was worried about Phoebe's safety and got her to leave the Bay for a few days. Westaway commented "He's very protective of Phoebe." After realising that she did not want to live in fear, Phoebe returned to be by Kyle's side. Shortly after someone broke into the house and Kyle was attacked. After he recovered, Kyle spotted his attacker with Phoebe's father and realised that Mark was behind the attempt on his life. Kyle tried to keep the truth from Phoebe, but after she found out he was forced to apologise. Phoebe then threatened to go to the police about her father, but Kyle and Casey talked her out of it.

When Kyle displayed his aggressive side again, Phoebe was left worrying about the future of their relationship. After Kyle refused to take a day off work to write music with her, Phoebe used her manipulative streak to start "pushing Kyle's buttons". She asked Matt Page (Alec Snow) to listen to her song at the restaurant and then invited him to her place to write with her, which infuriated Kyle. A TV Soap writer observed, "Kyle's rage stuns Phoebe and is her first hint that there might be something fundamentally wrong with their relationship." Kyle was surprised that Phoebe asked Matt to be her song writing partner simply because he had to work. Ignoring her concerns about Kyle, Phoebe asked Matt if she could post their song on her website, but when he insulted her work Kyle got physically aggressive with Matt. A frightened Phoebe sought comfort and advice from Denny Miller (Jessica Grace Smith). Kyle later apologised to Phoebe and she apologised for trying to manipulate him but she was still "rattled" by Kyle's display of anger. She told him that if he could not deal with his issues, they would not have a future together.

When Kyle developed a serious throat injury, he was told he could not sing anymore. Phoebe then decided that she too would not sing, until Kyle was better. said it was Phoebe's way of letting Kyle know they were in it together. When Kyle organised an after party for the Bay's Colour Run, he chose Matt to be the musical entertainment, however after Matt failed to turn up, Kyle convinced Phoebe to take his place. Giovinazzo commented that the festive spirit also persuaded Phoebe to change her mind and once she began singing, she was "in her element". Kyle then proposed to Phoebe on the balcony at Angelo's in front of everyone. Phoebe was in "total disbelief" as Kyle knew that she was not keen on marriage and settling down. She turned his proposal down and left the balcony. Phoebe then spent the night at Ricky's and she and Kyle argued. When asked if there was any hope of salvaging their romance, Giovinazzo told an Inside Soap columnist "Phoebe would like to try, because she's not ready to give up on their relationship. But I don't think she truly understands the 'in it for the long haul' sentiment just yet – in any respect!"

=== Music career ===
In November 2014, Jolene Anderson joined the cast as Neive Devlin, a record producer who comes to the Bay to see Phoebe perform, after hearing her music on her website. Anderson commented, "Neive is on the prowl for up and coming young things and Phoebe is one of them." Neive loved Phoebe's "rock chick" attitude and told her that she would be "music's next big thing", which caused tension between Phoebe and Kyle. After attending a recording session in the city, Phoebe returned to the Bay with a new wardrobe and a more pop sound. Westaway said Kyle was very wary of what was happening to Phoebe and the avenue she was going down. Unlike Phoebe, Kyle did not trust Neive and believed that she did not have Phoebe's best interests at heart. He also did not like the contract she offered Phoebe, as it gave her very little control over her career. Westaway added that Kyle's biggest concern was that Phoebe was selling out. However, Brax sided with Phoebe, claiming the recording contract was a "once-in-a-lifetime opportunity" and she would be foolish to turn it down.

Neive later arranged an industry launch night in the city for Phoebe. However, Phoebe was "blissfully" unaware that Neive was planning something more sinister for her, as she was focused on her potential music career. While Phoebe was preparing for her set, Neive's assistant, Grant Barnes (Adam Gray) asked her if she wanted Phoebe to perform, and when Neive said no, he spiked Phoebe's drink. Neive then insisted that Phoebe drink the champagne, which left her incapacitated and with no idea what was going on. Grant then tried to undress and assault Phoebe while they were being filmed. Phoebe was rescued by Andy Barrett (Tai Hara) and Martin Ashford (George Mason), but Grant told Neive that they had enough footage to post online. Giovinazzo summed up Phoebe's short-lived music career: "Phoebe lives and breathes music and believes it can change the world. She was then introduced to the media-inclined industry, fought for what she believed in, but was ultimately pulled into the machine." Giovinazzo enjoyed the storyline, calling it a "wonderful journey to play".

=== Stalker ===
"Initially, she was pretty chuffed to have a fan. It was kind of cool, because she had never met a stranger who loved her music. He had seemed a little persistent, but she wasn't really too concerned."

— Giovinazzo on Phoebe's initial reaction to Ryan's attentions.

In early 2015, Phoebe became the centre of a dark storyline involving a stalker. Shortly after the video of Phoebe looking like "a crazed party animal" was posted online, Ryan Kelly (Daniel Webber) turned up in Summer Bay looking for her. Ryan watched and followed Phoebe, before leaving her a tiara and a rose for her outside the Braxton's house. Ryan later came face-to-face with Phoebe and told her he was a huge fan of her music. Giovinazzo commented that Ryan seemed "quite strange", while TV Week's Stephen Downie noted that he was after more than Phoebe's autograph. Ryan later entered Phoebe's home, knowing she was alone. Phoebe tried to act calm and gave Ryan some CDs in a bid to get him to leave. However, Ryan persisted and told Phoebe that he wanted to take her to his house so she could focus on her music. Giovinazzo explained that Phoebe was "freaking out" as she knew Kyle was not around to help her. After Ryan refused to leave, Phoebe screamed for help, attracting the attention of her neighbour John Palmer (Shane Withington), who chased Ryan away.

Phoebe was relieved when Kyle returned home and she decided to keep the incident with Ryan a secret, but she was soon forced to tell Kyle what had happened. Ryan was later spotted in the Bay by Katarina Chapman (Pia Miller), who warned him to leave, and Kyle, who threatened him. However, when Ryan learned Phoebe and the rest of the Braxtons were out for the day, he gained entry to the house and placed a camera in Phoebe's bedroom. Later, when Ryan noticed Phoebe was home alone, he broke in again and waited for Phoebe behind the door. When she entered the room, Ryan came up behind her and placed a cloth soaked in chloroform over her mouth, before kidnapping her. Ryan tied Phoebe to a chair and told her he wanted to save her. He forced her to change into a white dress and take off her make-up. Giovinazzo commented, "Phoebe struggles and screams, but no-one can hear her." Ryan wanted to take Phoebe back to the person she was before her failed music career and he made Phoebe sing for him. During her performance, Phoebe kicked Ryan in the groin and was rescued by Kyle and the police. Kat later told Phoebe that Ryan has been sentenced to seven years in prison.

=== Relationship with Martin Ashford and pregnancy ===
When Kyle told Phoebe he wanted them to get back together, she rejected him, as she believed he was still grieving for his brother. She later spoke with Ash about people being in a hurry to get serious in relationships, leading him to try and prove to her that he felt the same way. Ash challenged Phoebe to go skinny dipping, and an Inside Soap reporter noted that they seemed to have "a great time" splashing around in the water. Phoebe decided to make things more interesting by stealing Ash's clothes, forcing him to return to the caravan park naked. When Ash saw Phoebe coming out of the shower block, he tried to take her towel, but ended up pulling her to the ground with him. Both Phoebe and Ash realised that there was an attraction between them, but feeling "awkward" they both returned to their respective vans unable to admit it out loud. The following day, Phoebe reunited with Kyle and he invited her to move back in with him. A "disappointed" Ash then questioned Phoebe about her change of heart.

Phoebe broke up with Kyle again after admitting she had feelings for Ash. When Phoebe and Ash teamed up to try to find a grieving Ricky, they grew closer and almost kissed. After Ash found Ricky and returned to the Bay, he and Phoebe eventually kissed and had sex in the back of his car, despite her reservations about the timing. Both Kyle and Ash's ex-girlfriend Denny reacted badly to Phoebe and Ash's new relationship. Kyle believed Ash was being disloyal, while a confrontation between Denny and Phoebe turned physical. Denny tried to help Kyle by taking him out dancing, but the following day he decided to temporarily leave town. A couple of weeks later, Denny found a positive pregnancy test in the bin. She initially assumed it belonged to house mate Hannah Wilson (Cassie Howarth), but Phoebe eventually admitted that it was hers. Giovinazzo explained that Phoebe did not want anyone to know she was pregnant until she had made a decision about the baby, but she was happy to have Denny and Hannah's support. Giovinazzo said, "These women always look after each other – Denny puts her history with Phoebe's boyfriend Ash aside, and Hannah, who's a nurse, helps out from a medical perspective."

Giovinazzo was pleased to receive the storyline, and she told Kerry Harvey of Stuff.co.nz: "I just read it in the script. It was a new aspect of the character and of myself to discover so I was really excited." On-screen, Phoebe was unsure who the father of her baby was. Giovinazzo thought Ash would make a good father, but Phoebe did not know if he wanted children, while Kyle wanted to be a father, but it would put everyone in an awkward position if he was. Phoebe decided to find out who the father was through a paternity test. Both Kyle and Ash were already at the hospital, recovering from surgery, as Ash gave a kidney to Kyle. Ash was upset when he overheard Phoebe telling Kyle that he would make a better father, so Phoebe decided that they should sit down and make some ground rules. When they all began to argue, a stressed out Phoebe suddenly collapsed in pain. When the results from the paternity test came back, Westaway commented "There is no situation that will appease all of them. It just has to play out. They have to deal with the fallout, whatever it might be." He also said that Kyle would want to reunite with Phoebe if the baby was his, as he always wanted a family. Kyle was revealed to be the father and Phoebe tried to assure Ash that they could make their situation work, but he ended their relationship instead.

Phoebe and Ash later reunited, while Kyle and Ash decided to set "aside their differences" and support Phoebe. During an ultrasound, Phoebe learns that she had been pregnant with twins, but one had died. She was then informed that the surviving baby had a congenital heart defect and would be unlikely to live long past birth. Phoebe is advised to have an abortion, and Giovinazzo said that it was "a hard decision for her to make". Phoebe opted not to terminate her pregnancy, but shortly after, she suffered a miscarriage. Giovinazzo described the pregnancy storyline as "tumultuous". She also thought that Phoebe's personality had been affected by everything she endured, stating "This question of family has changed her. She has grown a lot as a character and started to consider things that are very new to her." Giovinazzo added that Phoebe was prepared to care for another person, which was a big change. Phoebe eventually ended her relationship with Ash. When he wakes with no recollection of the night before and a strange woman in his flat, he admits to Billie that he thinks he cheated on Phoebe. The woman eventually returned to speak with him and he became convinced that he had cheated, so he told Phoebe, who walked away from him.

=== Relationship with Justin Morgan ===
In a March 2016 interview with Colin Vickery of news.com.au, Giovinazzo commented that there would be a potential new love interest for Phoebe coming up. She also described it as "maybe a more mature love." Two months later, the Morgan siblings were introduced to Home and Away and Phoebe had a one-night stand with Justin Morgan (James Stewart), after meeting him on the beach. As they continued to get to know each other, Stewart said that Justin was developing feelings for Phoebe and was certain that she felt the same way. He continued, "Phoebe keeps doing things that make him know she digs him." Phoebe and Justin were later threatened by Spike Lowe (Jason Montgomery), who was working for a drugs syndicate that were after the Morgans. He demands that Phoebe and Justin look through several boxes for a book detailing the syndicate's activities. Justin wants to get Phoebe out of harm's way, but neither of them are willing to "detach". Stewart commented, "she desperately wants to help Justin and Justin doesn't want to lose her." Spike leaves and warns Justin that he will hurt anyone close to Justin if he does not get the book.

After Phoebe is carjacked by Simmo (James O'Connell), she becomes depressed, so Justin decides to cheer her up by singing to her at Salt. Phoebe joins him to perform a duet and they later share a kiss. Giovinazzo commented, "Phoebe can't deny that she has strong and deep feelings for Justin. They're just drawn to each other." However, with Justin's family still in danger from a gang of criminals, Giovinazzo said Phoebe had to be smart about the situation. Shortly after Phoebe moves in with Justin and his siblings, Justin proposes to her. Phoebe initially rejects the proposal, as she feels she is not "a marriage kind of gal". But after talking things through with Justin, she accepts.

=== Departure ===
In March 2017, Sophie Dainty of Digital Spy reported that Phoebe could be the next character to leave the show. On-screen, Phoebe receives a visit from her friend Donna Fields (Melissa Bonne), who reignites Phoebe's interest in the music industry. Donna offers Phoebe a job as her opening act. Phoebe is initially unsure about accepting the offer, as she is aware that it could be extended for months, but Justin encourages her to go. Shortly after returning, Phoebe reveals she has been offered a year long contract to tour the United States. Justin decides to go with her, but his daughter Ava Gilbert (Grace Thomas) arrives in the Bay unexpectedly. Phoebe eventually decides to leave without him, and she made her last appearance on 11 May 2017. Giovinazzo later confirmed that she had decided to leave the show to pursue new roles. When asked if there was a chance she would return to Home and Away, Giovinazzo said "Never say never! I love what I'm doing now, but Phoebe left town – she didn't die – so there's always a chance [of coming back]."

== Reception ==
"Not many women in the Bay have the guts to stand up to the dodgy Braxton clan. But just because she's Kyle's girlfriend doesn't mean that headstrong Phoebe is going to stand for her man putting his family before her!"

— An Inside Soap columnist on why they loved Phoebe (2015)

At the 2015 TV Week and Soap Extra #OMGAwards Phoebe and Ash won the Best Shock Kiss category, while Phoebe, Ash and Kyle won Best Love Triangle. Ahead of Phoebe's on-screen arrival, Ash from Pedestrian.tv thought that her introduction might have been "a belated reply" to a pop culture reference made by rival soap opera Neighbours. He called Phoebe "a new cool cat Summer Bay resident" and a "free-spirited indie musician and possible home-wrecker". As Phoebe and Kyle performed at the festival, a reporter for the Sunday Mail observed that "the chemistry between them is palpable." A Sun-Herald contributor was not a fan of Phoebe, branding her "one of H&A's more annoying characters". When Phoebe debuted her new pop look, TV Week's Stephen Downie observed "Phoebe looks so hot she could melt tarmac at an Alaskan airport."

When Phoebe was later asked to go on tour and leave Kyle behind, TV Week columnists Holly Richards and Bianca La Cioppa debated whether she should give up love or her career. Richards wanted Phoebe to leave, saying that she needed to get her "head out of the clouds" and not throw away the opportunity of a lifetime for a boy. Richards commented "Honestly, I thought Phoebe was a lot smarter than this." La Cioppa thought Phoebe would be making the right choice if she stayed for Kyle, explaining "One, because I'd hate to see them break up (they're my fave H&A couple!). Two, because they have years of history behind them that everyone tends to forget." In February 2015, an Inside Soap contributor observed, "Rock chick Phoebe is quite a handful". Of Phoebe and Justin's romance, a writer for TV Week stated, "They're on. They're off. It's hard to keep up with Justin (James Stewart) and Phoebe's (Isabella Giovinazzo) relationship." Ali Cromarty of TV Week noted that "ever since they first locked eyes, the chemistry between Justin and Phoebe has been palpable."
