= Home and Away: Revenge =

- Genre: Soap opera Drama
- Written by: Dan Bennett; Brooke Wilson
- Directed by: Arnie Custo
- Starring: Dan Ewing; Lisa Gormley; Diarmid Heidenreich; Lisa Flanagan; Lynne McGranger; Kyle Pryor; George Mason
- Composer: Michael Yezerski
- Country of origin: Australia
- Original language: English

Production
- Executive producers: John Holmes; Julie McGauran
- Producer: Lucy Addario
- Cinematography: Bob Miller
- Editor: Stafford Jackson Wales
- Running time: 105 minutes
- Production company: Seven Productions

Original release
- Network: Foxtel on Demand; Foxtel Play; Presto
- Release: 19 December 2016

Related
- Home and Away; Home and Away: An Eye for an Eye; Home and Away: All or Nothing

Home and Away: Revenge is a television film and spin-off of the Australian soap opera Home and Away. It was co-written by Dan Bennett and Brooke Wilson, and directed by Arnie Custo. Revenge premiered on 19 December 2016 on Foxtel on Demand, Foxtel Play and Presto, shortly after the season finale of Home and Away aired on Seven Network. It was commissioned along with Home and Away: All or Nothing following the success of the 2015 telefilm Home and Away: An Eye for an Eye, which broke Presto streaming records. Revenge serves as a sequel to An Eye for an Eye and also features current and returning Home and Away cast members.

The plot focuses on Bianca Scott (Lisa Gormley) and Heath Braxton (Dan Ewing), who take a late honeymoon in the Northern Territory. When Bianca is kidnapped by Trevor "Gunno" Gunson (Diarmid Heidenreich), Heath's attempts to find her are hampered when he comes under suspicion from Sergeant Amy Peters (Lisa Flanagan). Revenge was mostly shot on-location in Alice Springs and Darwin. Several scenes for the special were shot at Ooraminna Homestead, a former film set, and the Ormiston Gorge. Home and Away: Revenge received a mixed response from critics, with one calling it an "underwhelming endeavour".

== Plot ==
Heath Braxton and Bianca Scott travel to the Northern Territory for a late honeymoon. They are followed by Trevor "Gunno" Gunson, who they presumed dead after Heath let him fall from a cliff. In Summer Bay, Irene is looking after Heath's teenage daughter Darcy. Darcy tells Martin "Ash" Ashford and Irene that she is worried about Bianca being alone with Heath following their recent marital problems. Heath and Bianca learn they have been booked on a helicopter flight and their pilot Barry takes them out to a gorge. Heath returns Bianca's wedding bracelet to her, after she removed it during their rough patch. They realise that Barry is late picking them up. While Heath goes to higher ground to find a phone signal, Bianca is kidnapped by Gunno. He dumps an unconscious Barry in the bush and drives Bianca to an abandoned town.

Heath realises Gunno has Bianca and runs to the nearest road, where he flags down a passing motorist and goes to the police station. Homicide detective sergeant Amy Peters questions Heath, and he reveals Gunno took Bianca to get revenge for Heath trying to kill him. Heath calls Irene to let her know that Bianca is missing, and Ash and Nate Cooper travel out to help. Peters brings Heath to the station, where she questions him about the incident with Gunno. Meanwhile, Bianca wakes up in an old hotel tied to a piano. Gunno explains that he has spent 12 months healing from his injuries and forming his revenge plan – framing Heath for Bianca's murder. Heath is bailed, but Gunno watches on as Peters takes him back to the gorge, after forensics match some blood at the scene to Bianca. Nate and Ash find Bianca's bracelet at the heliport.

Heath becomes frustrated with the police and attempts to run away. He is taken back to the station, where he meets his lawyer Grant Purcell. Peters reveals a life insurance policy was taken out on Bianca and she formally charges Heath with Bianca's murder. Gunno texts Ash a picture of Bianca and the address of where to find them. With Gunno unaware of Nate's presence, Ash drops him off on the way into the town and he goes to find Bianca. Gunno confronts Ash with a gun and tells him to handcuff himself to the fireplace. Barry wakes up and is taken to the hospital, where he reveals Gunno attacked him. Heath is released and he and the police race to the abandoned town. As Gunno forces Ash and Bianca to choose who will die, Nate attacks him and knocks the gun out of his hand. Gunno gets Nate in a headlock, but Bianca punches him. Heath arrives with the police, who arrest Gunno. After returning to Sydney, Bianca takes a pregnancy test, while Gunno is shown arriving at the prison and noticing Heath's younger brother, Kyle Braxton.

== Cast ==
(In order of appearance)

- Dan Ewing as Heath Braxton
- Lisa Gormley as Bianca Scott
- Diarmid Heidenreich as Trevor Gunson
- Kyle Pryor as Nate Cooper
- Lynne McGranger as Irene Roberts
- Alea O'Shea as Darcy Callahan
- Scott Fraser as Barry
- George Mason as Martin Ashford
- Lisa Flanagan as Amy Peters
- Ben Wood as Grant Purcell
- Alexander Bertrand as Constable Dave
- Nic Westaway as Kyle Braxton

== Production ==
=== Conception and development ===
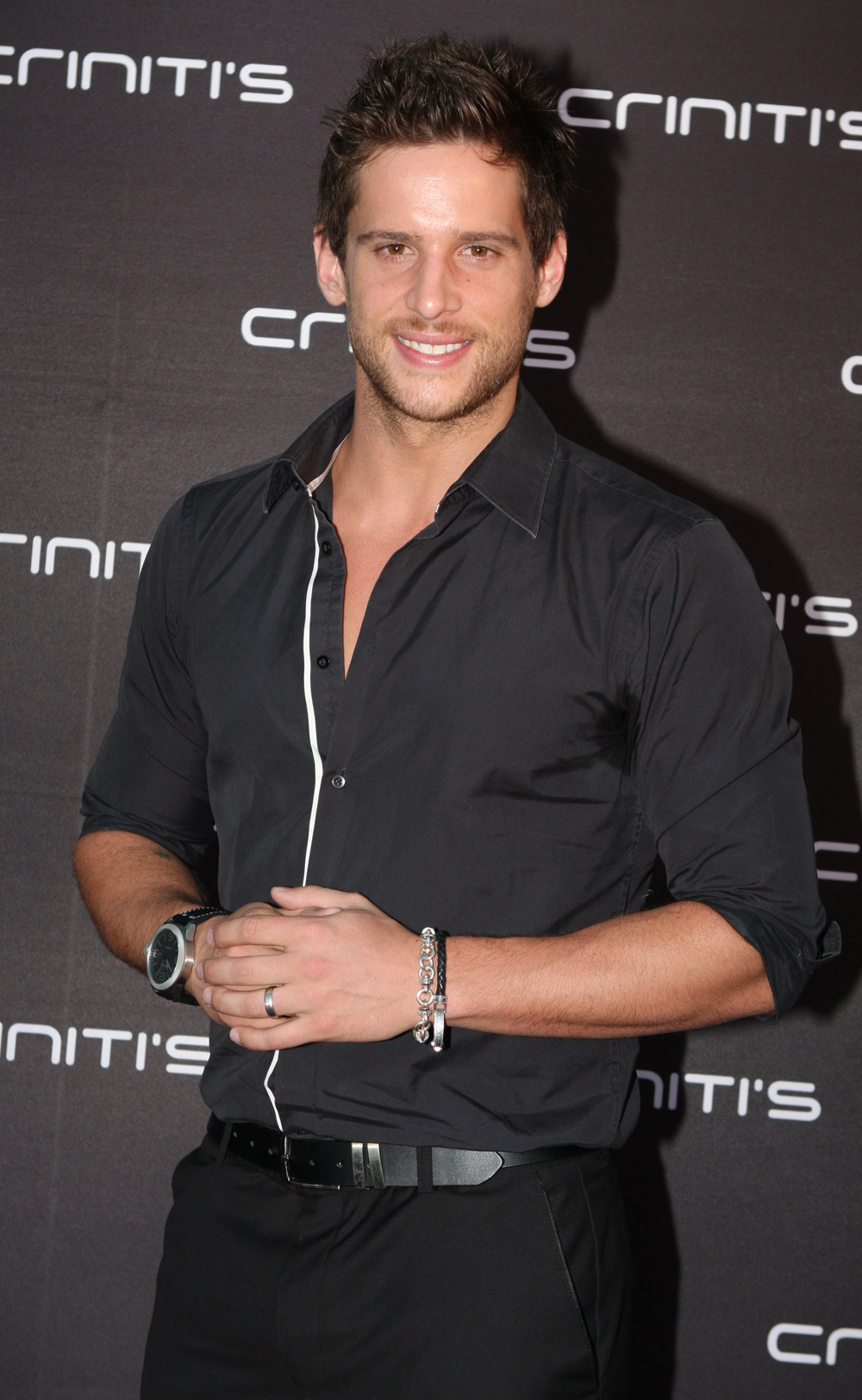
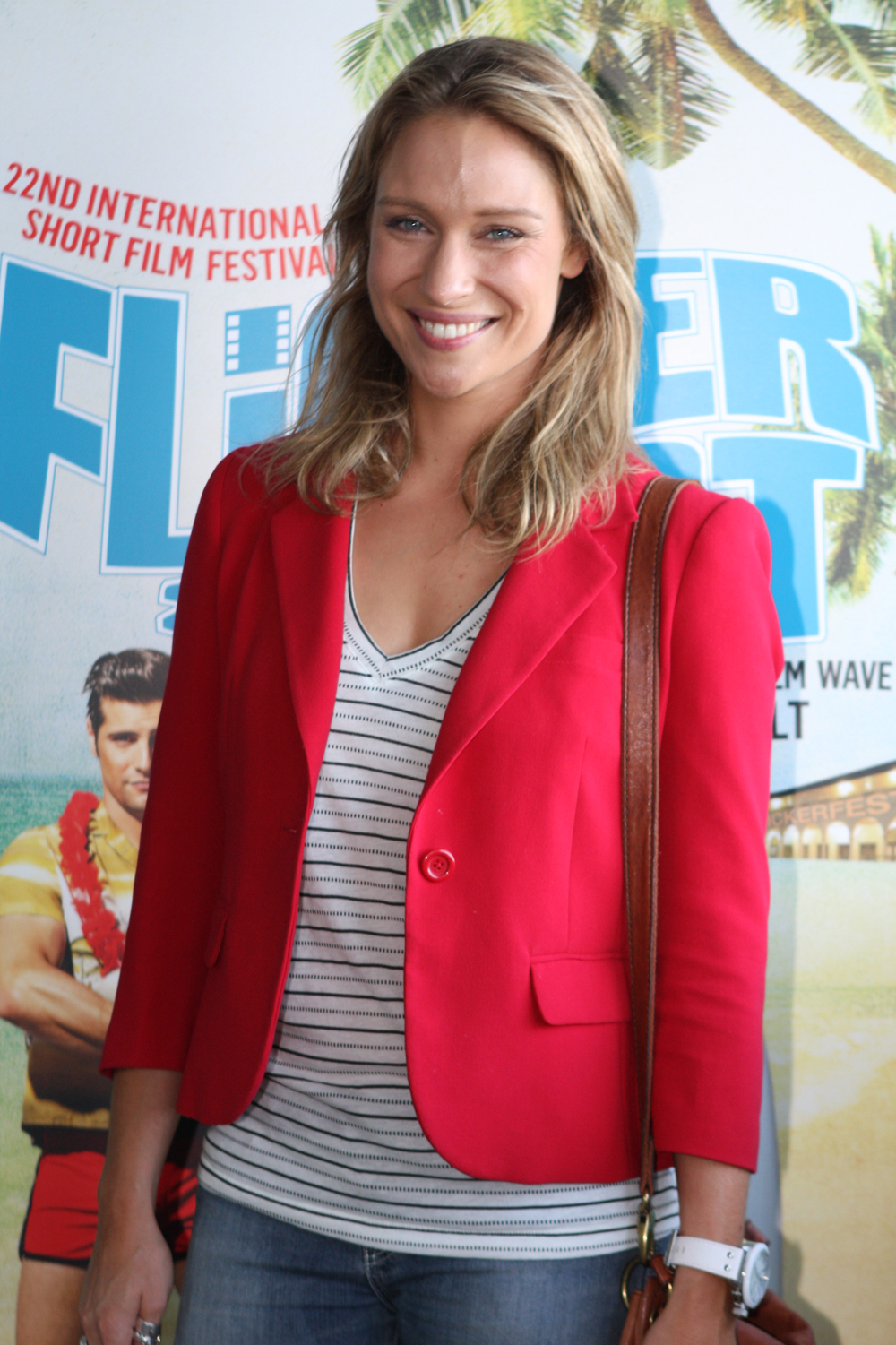
Dan Ewing (left) and Lisa Gormley (right) reprised their roles of Heath Braxton and Bianca Scott respectively.

Following the success of Home and Away: An Eye for an Eye, which broke Presto streaming records when it aired in 2015, Tiffany Dunk of The Daily Telegraph reported that the company were looking to create further spin-offs. Revenge was commissioned along with All or Nothing in May 2016. A reporter for MediaWeek said scripts were in development and production would begin during the coming months, with the first special airing later that year. Revenge serves as a sequel to An Eye for an Eye. It also adheres to Home and Away's PG classification, so it does not put off long term viewers.

Actors Dan Ewing and Lisa Gormley, who play Heath Braxton and Bianca Scott respectively, returned to Home and Away in late 2016, and their storylines lead into Revenge. Ewing liked that their characters appeared in the main show first, as not all of their fans have access to Foxtel. He also told Sue Yeap of The West Australian that despite the name, the special felt more like a feature film than an episode of Home and Away. He continued, "We're shooting like a feature film, the production values, the scripts are much different to the regular shows... it's a great experience."

The plot focuses on Heath Braxton and his wife Bianca Scott, who travel to the Northern Territory for the honeymoon they never had, unaware that they are being followed by their enemy Trevor "Gunno" Gunson (Diarmid Heidenreich), who Heath believes he killed. Gunno kidnaps Bianca, causing Heath to come under suspicion. Gormley stated that Heath and Bianca use the holiday as a way of finding out if they still like each other, which is made all the more difficult when Gunno's revenge plan separates them.

=== Casting ===
Like An Eye for an Eye, Revenge features both current and returning Home and Away cast members. In November 2016, it was confirmed that actors Dan Ewing and Lisa Gormley would be reprising their roles of Heath Braxton and Bianca Scott respectively. Gormley "took no convincing" to reprise her role of Bianca. She was the only female cast member to travel to the Northern Territory. Gormley admitted that she became "emotionally invested" in the role and was happy to get involved in the action. Ewing found the opportunity to return as Heath in Revenge "as too good to refuse". He also stated that since An Eye for an Eye, Heath had changed and matured. He is no longer wearing singlets and his grenade neck tattoo is gone. The actor also admitted that while he enjoyed filming the spin-offs, he was unlikely to return to Home and Away full time.

The special also features regular Home and Away cast members George Mason (Martin "Ash" Ashford), Kyle Pryor (Nate Cooper) and Lynne McGranger (Irene Roberts). Ewing explained that as Heath was "kind of the big hero" in An Eye for an Eye, it was good that he could call upon Ash and Nate to help him out this time. He was also pleased to see Pryor away from the hospital set and featuring in the fight scenes, as Pryor is a former stunt man, who worked with Ewing on Power Rangers RPM. Diarmid Heidenreich reprised his role of Trevor "Gunno" Gunson, who was last seen falling from a cliff in An Eye for an Eye. In Revenge, Gunno sports a large scar on his head. Ewing praised Heidenreich's scary performance in Revenge, and said Gunno returns "more bitter and twisted than before." Alea O'Shea also reprised her role of Heath's daughter Darcy Callahan.

Producers offered actress Lisa Flanagan the role of Sergeant Amy Peters without an audition. Flanagan admitted that she had wanted to appear on Home and Away for a while. Amy was the first indigenous female character to be introduced to the show, and Flanagan hoped more Aboriginal actors would appear in the serial in the future. Flanagan reprised the role in the main show in June 2021.

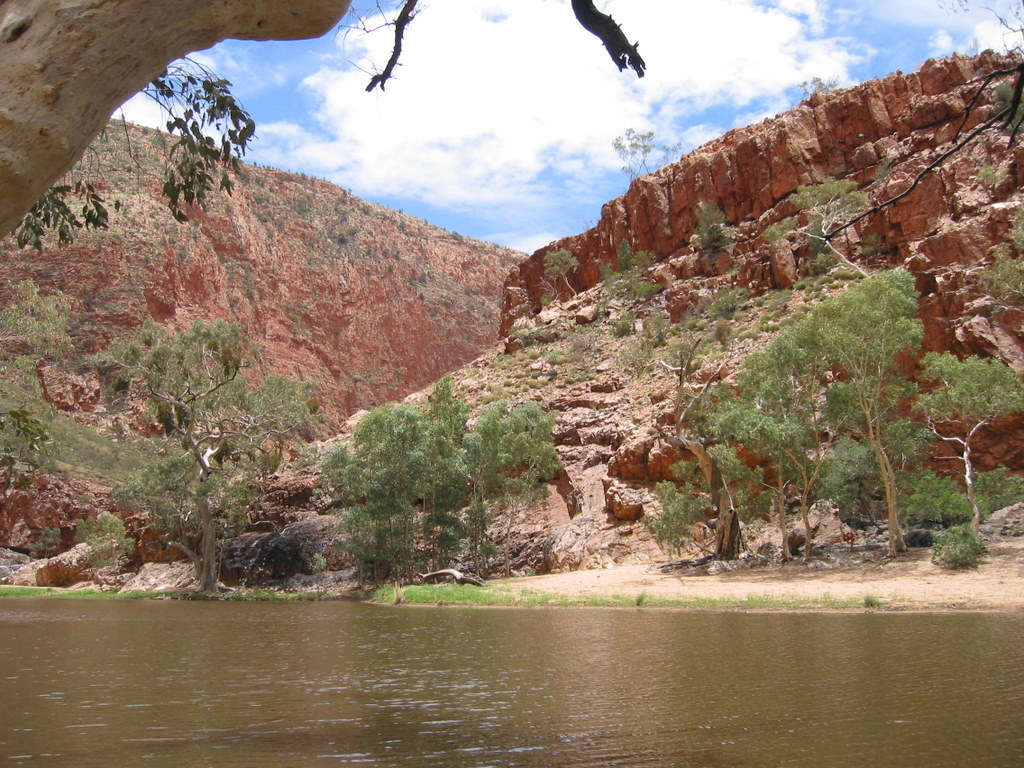
Scenes were shot at the Ormiston gorge.

=== Filming ===
Revenge was produced by Seven Productions. It was mostly filmed across the Northern Territory in Alice Springs and Darwin. Filming took place during the winter and lasted for ten days. Gormley pointed out that the weather conditions were different to Sydney, where Home and Away is filmed. On the first day, the production was interrupted by rain and Gormley said the crew had "to get creative" with the environment. Of filming in the Northern Territory, Gormley commented, "Bianca has spent most of her life living in Europe so I think everyone wants to see the Red Centre at some point, its one of those really iconic places. I have always wanted to come as well so I was really pumped when they said where we going."

Several scenes were shot at a cattle station and the former film set Ooraminna Homestead, just outside Alice Springs. Yeap (The West Australian) observed that it was "an ideal setting" for the special. The production also filmed at Ormiston Gorge, a waterhole surrounded by mountains. The Summer Bay scenes were filmed in Sydney. Ewing explained that guerrilla filmmaking was employed during the shoot and they had a skeleton crew for much of it. Ewing and Gormley shot some of the footage themselves using mobile phones and GoPro cameras. Ewing found the tough conditions helped his performance. For Heath's interrogation scenes, Ewing used method acting. He deliberately got as little sleep as possible the night before and drank double espressos to help him portray Heath's anger.

== Broadcast ==
Home and Away: Revenge was released on Foxtel Play and Foxtel on Demand on 19 December 2016, immediately following the season finale of Home and Away on Channel Seven. It was also available to Presto subscribers. Revenge was broadcast in the United Kingdom on digital station 5Star on 13 March in a 95-minute timeslot. The spin-off was broadcast as three 30-minute episodes on RTÉ2 in Ireland.

== Reception ==
In its UK broadcast on 5Star, Revenge was seen by 260,000 viewers, making it the eighth most-watched show on the channel for that week.

Brad Newsome of The Sydney Morning Herald gave Revenge a mostly negative review, writing "Summer Bay meets Wolf Creek? Now there's a notion that might have a certain appeal. But despite the Outback setting and the gruff baddie on the loose, this standalone Home and Away special doesn't build much in the way of tension, let alone terror." Newsome called the telefilm an "underwhelming endeavour", but added that Gunno was enjoyable to watch.

TV Week's Stephen Downie gave a more positive response to the telefilm. He thought Heath and Bianca being the focus of Revenge made "perfect sense". He praised Ewing for bringing his "A-game", and Mason and Pryor for their "solid" performances. Like Newsome, Downie also enjoyed Gunno's scenes, and Heidenreich's portrayal of him, saying "Maybe it's the shaved head or the fact he looks like he's been hitting the cheeseburgers, but there's real menace to Gunno this time around."

Rachael Gavin of TV Soap commented, "this production is unlike watching a regular episode of Home and Away, with fact-paced action and stunts all set to the backdrop of the Northern Territory."
