= Lisa Gormley =

British-born Australian actress (born 1984)

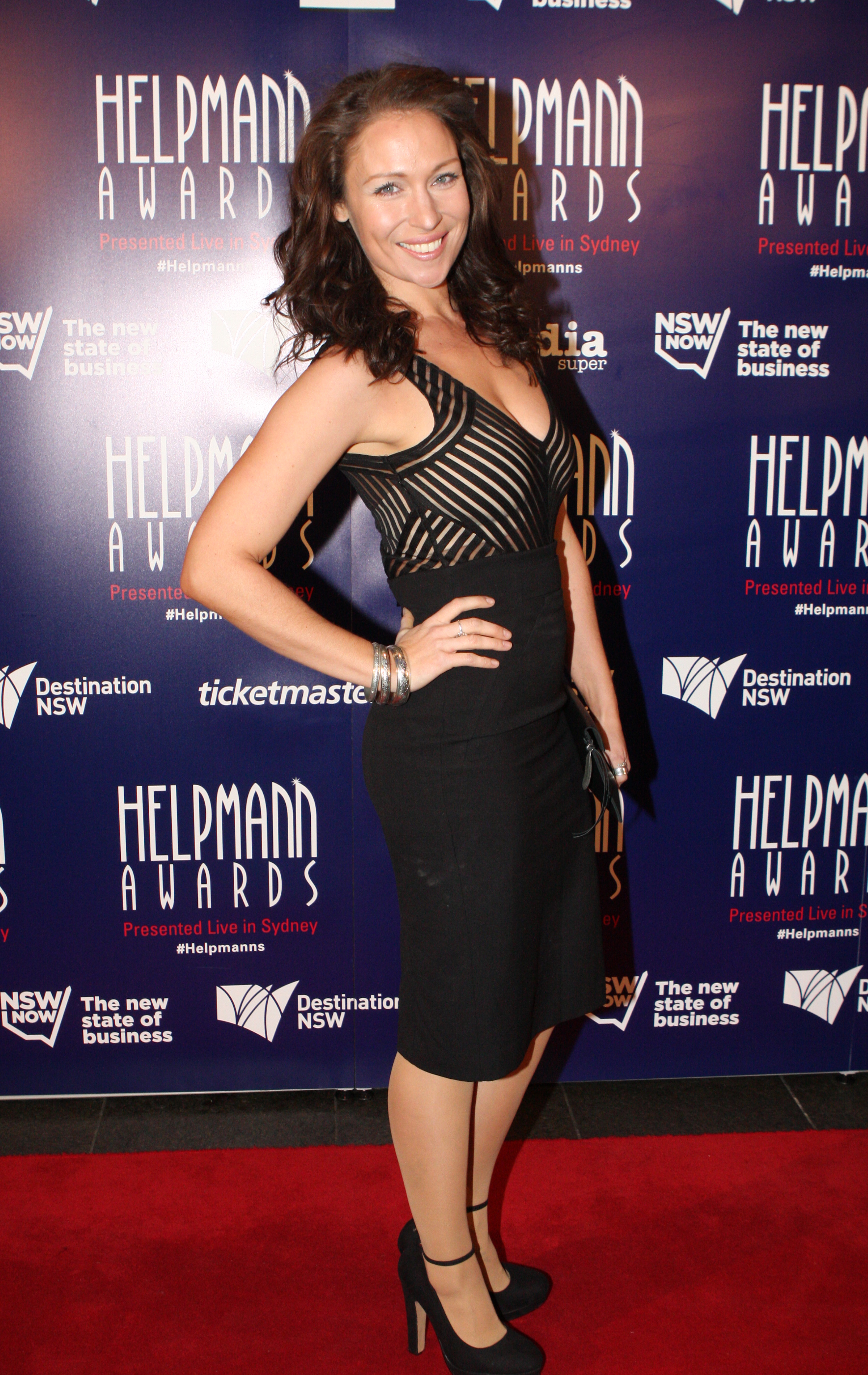
- Gormley in 2015
- Born: 29 September 1984 (age 42); Bradford, West Yorkshire, England
- Occupations: Actress; Flight attendant (former)
- Years active: 1997-present

Lisa Gormley (born 29 September 1984) is an English-born Australian actress and best known for playing Bianca Scott on the Channel 7 serial drama Home and Away. She is a NIDA graduate.

== Early life ==
Gormley was born in Bradford, West Yorkshire, England. When she was 3, her family relocated to the Barossa Valley in South Australia, and at age 12 they moved again to a farm in Southern Tasmania. A country girl at heart, Gormley immediately made herself at home spending her formative years on a 50-acre (200,000 m^{2}) property.

At an early age, Gormley became involved in youth community theatre with a vivid memory of her first play, "Oliver!". As an only child, she was drawn to the social aspect of theatre and it was through this environment that she developed her love of acting.

== Education and career ==
Gormley attended Woodbridge District High School from 1997 to 2000. She then attended Rosny College in Hobart from 2001 to 2002. She performed as a courtesan in the school's annual stage production of "A Funny Thing Happened on the Way to the Forum" c.2001.

After finishing college, Gormley travelled to the UK where she became a flight attendant for Qantas.

When Gormley returned to Australia she was accepted into NIDA, in which she was involved in technical production, teaching, directing and acting. She graduated at the end of 2009.

Gormley appeared in the 2010 film Before the Rain. That same year, Gormley received the role of Bianca Scott, the sister of April Scott (Rhiannon Fish), in Home and Away. She left the series in 2014 after almost four years. She returned to the role in 2016.

During her time on Home and Away, Gormley portrayed Bianca in several dramatic stories, including sexual assault, the death of Bianca's infant son from SIDS, and substance abuse. While researching these storylines, Gormley sought to understand the experiences of those affected and recognised the responsibility involved in portraying their stories sensitively.

From January to March 2017, Gormley starred in David Williamson's play Odd Man Out at the Ensemble Theatre.

== Filmography ==
Television
Year	Title	Role	Notes
2010–14; 2016–17	Home and Away	Bianca Scott	Seasons 23–27, main role (372 episodes); Seasons 29–30, recurring role (23 episodes)
2015	Home and Away: An Eye for an Eye	Bianca Scott	Presto streaming special
2016	Home and Away: Revenge	Bianca Scott	Presto streaming special
2017	Home and Away: All or Nothing	Bianca Scott	Presto streaming special
2018	Bite Club	Lisa Harris	Season 1, Episode 8 (guest role)
2020	The Gloaming	Angela Bloomhall	Season 1 (recurring, 5 episodes)
2021	Rosehaven	Erin	Season 5, Episode 3 (guest role)
2023	Deadloch	Michelle Buckley	Season 1: 8 episodes
2023	Bay of Fires	Caley	1 episode
TBA	Early Retirement	Pamela	Upcoming

Film
Year	Film	Role	Notes
2010	Before the Rain	Karin	Segment: "Nicky Two-Tone"
2010	The Filmmaker	Mum	Short
2014	Magic Words	Mum	Short
2016	Bloodgurgler	Wendy	Short
2017	In Extremis	Claudia	Feature
2026	Balding	Melanie Gibson	Feature
