= Kyle Braxton =

Fictional character from the Australian soap opera Home and Away

- Home and Away character
- Portrayed by: Nic Westaway
- Duration: 2012–2016
- First appearance: 8 August 2012
- Last appearance: 21 April 2016
- Introduced by: Lucy Addario
- Book appearances: Home and Away: An Eye for an Eye
- Spin-off appearances: Home and Away: An Eye for an Eye (2015); Home and Away: Revenge (2016); Home and Away: All or Nothing (2017)
In-universe information
- Other names: Kyle Bennett
- Occupation: Restaurant co-owner Gym co-owner
- Father: Danny Braxton
- Stepmother: Cheryl Braxton
- Half-brothers: Darryl Braxton; Heath Braxton
- Nephews: Rocco Scott-Braxton; Harley Braxton; Casey Braxton
- Nieces: Darcy Callahan
- Other relatives: Casey Braxton

Kyle Braxton (also Bennett) was a fictional character from the Australian Channel Seven soap opera Home and Away, played by Nic Westaway. Kyle debuted on-screen during the episode airing on 8 August 2012. The actor was nervous about joining the established Braxton family because of their popularity with viewers. Kyle is a "damaged individual" who grew up without much love. His father, Danny Braxton (Andy McPhee) walked out on him and his mother died. He was placed into foster care. Kyle developed a vendetta against his half-brothers and when Casey Braxton (Lincoln Younes) kills Danny, Kyle kidnaps Casey and leaves him for dead in the Australian desert. Kyle moves to Summer Bay to begin a new life and seeks his brother's acceptance. But he falls in love with Casey's girlfriend Tamara Kingsley (Kelly Paterniti). Westaway has revealed that he developed a unique "death stare" for Kyle to give other characters.

Critics of the show have reacted positively to the character. The Daily Telegraph's Amy Harris branded him a "popular addition to the cast". The actor has been long-listed for a Logie Award and TV Week said that the role had made Westaway one of the "rising stars of 2013". Laura Morgan of All About Soap has labelled Kyle the show's "crazy bad boy". Westaway decided to leave the show after almost four years and Kyle was sent to prison for armed robbery. His exit scenes aired on 21 April 2016. Kyle was the last of the Braxton brothers to leave Home and Away.

== Casting ==
The character and casting was announced on 28 June 2012. Digital Spy's Daniel Kilkelly reported that Lincoln Younes had been tweeting about Westaway joining the cast and revealed that he had been listed as a Home and Away series regular on his agency profile. He added "the page names his character as Kyle Braxton, so it seems that recent arrival Danny won't be the last addition to the family!" Westaway was nervous joining the established Braxton family, who he believed to be "loved" by viewers. His first scene was with Andy McPhee (Danny Braxton) in the Summer Bay caravan park.

== Development ==
=== Backstory ===
Kyle's mother had an affair with married man Danny Braxton. He grew being Danny's secret child and never met his three half-brothers. Kyle's early life was difficult because of his mother's alcohol addiction. He enjoyed occasional visits from Danny and resented him leaving because he did not like sharing a father. Danny was sent to prison for committing an armed robbery and his mother's alcoholism worsened. She died while Kyle was eleven and he was put in foster care. They provided him with an education and tried to give him a good life. But Kyle later made contact with Danny and had him all to himself because his brothers wanted nothing to do with him. Kyle was happy to accommodate his father's requests and smuggled weapons into prison and ran violent errands for him. Kyle was sent to juvenile detention for breaking and entering and spent time in prison for assault and the theft of a vehicle. He committed endless crimes to impress his father. But then his half-brothers made contact and Danny gave all of his attention to them.

=== Characterisation ===
"Kyle looks like he’s got it all sorted –physically fit, confident, comfortable in his skin… he’s not particularly verbose and if you saw him in a pub, you’d either dismiss him as someone just there to have a quiet drink or avoid him for fear of ending up in a loud fight."

— Yahoo!7 on Kyle (2012)

Westaway told a reporter from Home and Away Official Collector's Edition that Kyle is a damaged individual who grew up with no love in his life because he was young when his mother died. His oldest brother Darryl Braxton (Steve Peacocke) identifies good within Kyle and can see that he has been damaged and misplaced his trust with Danny. But Kyle's good side has been buried in the crimes he committed. Westaway's biggest challenge when portraying Kyle is "keeping his edge because he's constantly trying to maintain a balance. If he becomes too vulnerable he's going to get hurt, and if he shuts himself off he's never going to get anywhere with his brothers.". Westaway has to visit the show's make-up department who create a brush-on tattoo for his scenes as Kyle. The actor enjoys his character's dark persona and spent hours practicing Kyle's "death stare" in front of a mirror.

=== Desert kidnapping ===
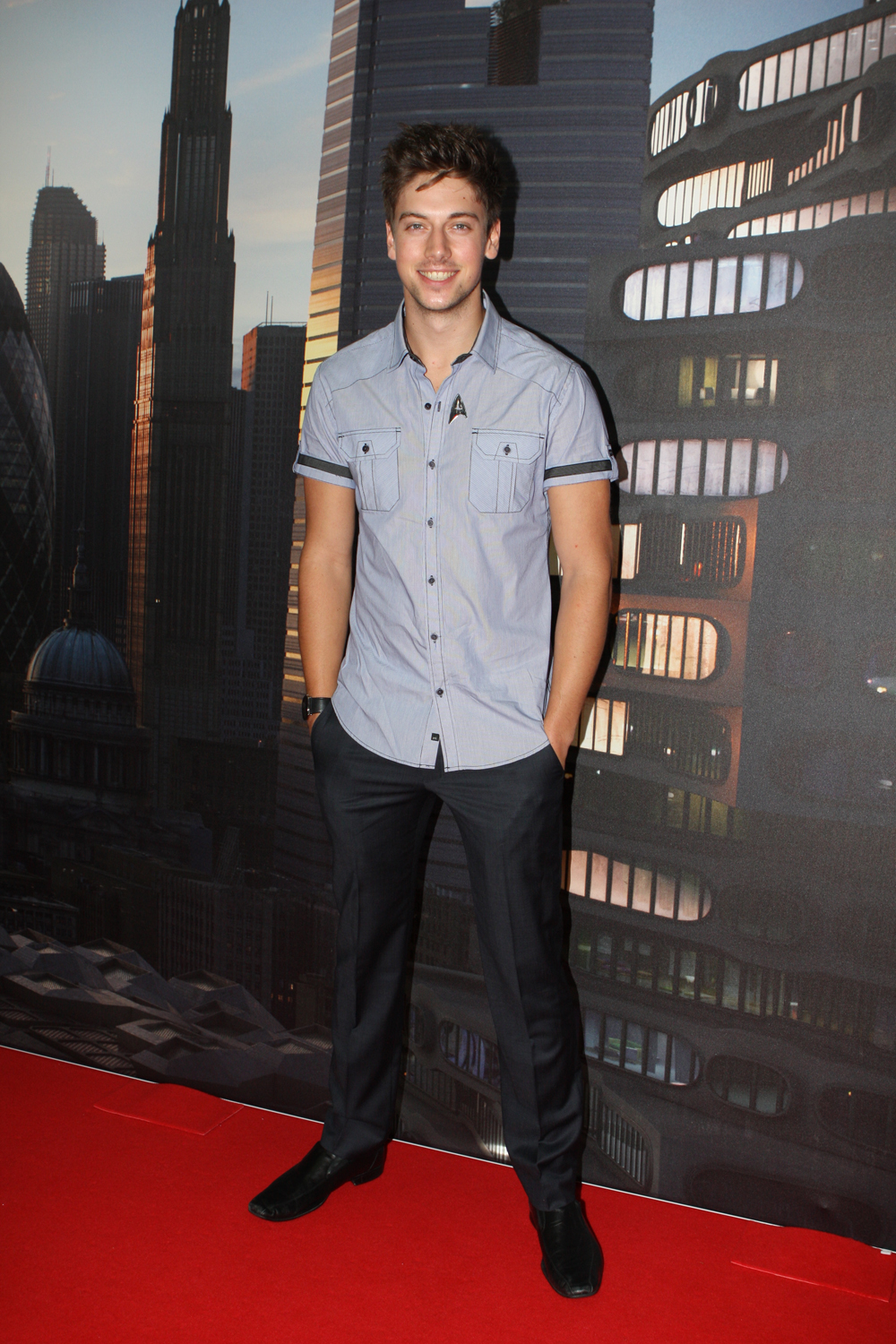
Lincoln Younes plays Kyle's rival Casey Braxton

Kyle is upset and wants revenge when Danny is killed by half-brother Casey Braxton (Lincoln Younes). In September, Kyle kidnaps Casey and holds him hostage in the desert. Younes told TV Week's Erin Miller "There has certainly been someone watching him for few weeks, which you've seen snippets of, and the inference is that it's related to his dad." Kyle eventually reveals that he is Danny's son. The storyline explores Kyle wanting revenge on Casey and exacts it by chaining him to a car in the remote Australian outback. Their eldest brother Brax tracks them down in an effort to save Casey. While on The Morning Show, Westaway told host Kylie Gillies that the episodes are action packed and full of surprises for both Casey and Kyle. Peacocke added that there were helicopters filming aerial shots, stunt men doing driving sequences and an explosion. While his character tries to save Casey and hurt Kyle. He added that the scenes are both unpredictable and dangerous. Younes revealed that Casey does not know who Kyle is, but he suspects that Kyle could be associated with the Braxton family. Executive producer Lucy Addario told Miller that Kyle's revenge on Casey required a remote location and it was "imperative" that they filmed outside of the show's setting.

Younes told Sarah Ellis from Inside Soap that Casey wakes up in the desert, badly beaten and greeted with a "mysterious stranger". Casey is shocked to learn of Kyle's actual identity and feels betrayed by their father. He also explained that Kyle becomes annoyed in the scenario as Brax constantly telephones Casey's mobile phone. The storyline cumulates in a series of dramas. They play out as Kyle's plan begins to fail with Tamara Kingsley (Kelly Paterniti) arriving to rescue Casey. Brax and his friend Natalie Davison (Catherine Mack) also find Kyle and a chase ensues. Kyle recaptures Casey but Tamara throws a can of petrol at him causing an explosion and tries to shoot him. Brax soon finds Kyle is unsympathetic when Kyle reveals that they are related.

Younes has claimed to have received "overwhelmingly positive" feedback on the storyline. But Westaway subsequently received death threats on social media website Twitter. Fans of Casey were angry, but Westaway perceived them to be playful and engrossed in the drama. Kyle comes to live with the Braxtons in Summer Bay. He has to give evidence at Casey's trial into Danny's murder. Younes told Miller that "if Kyle helps Casey out on the stand, then it would be the first step towards mending what has happened between them." Younes later told Daniel Kilkelly from Digital Spy that it will be tough for Kyle to earn Casey's respect and forgive him.

=== Tamara Kingsley ===
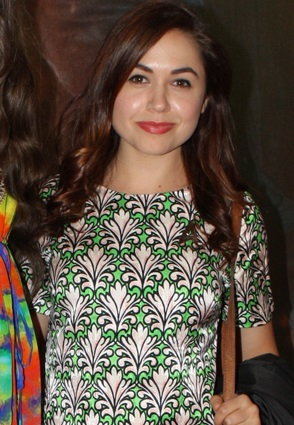
Kelly Paterniti plays Kyle's crush, Tamara Kingsley

Kyle helps Casey's girlfriend Tamara when her ex-boyfriend Nelson Gregory (Anthony Gee) becomes aggressive towards her. Paterniti told TV Week's Miller that Kyle helps Casey out and "I wouldn't say they become best friends, but it certainly does soften the tension between them." Kyle grows closer to Tamara while working alongside her in Angelo's. Tamara realises that Kyle has feelings for her when he gives her a meaningful look. Westaway told a reporter from Inside Soap that Kyle "thinks that if he and Tamara hadn't met in the circumstances they did, they'd get along really well. He certainly believes they have a lot more in common than she and Casey do." Kyle is a "go-getter" and he decides to see what happens if he lets Tamara know how he feels. Kyle does feel guilty about betraying Casey but he cannot help his feelings. Even though it will cause trouble with his newfound family, he carries on pursuing her. Westaway described Tamara as a strong woman and if partnered with Kyle, they "could take on the world together".

Paterniti told Amber Giles (of TV Week) that Tamara is shocked because she had always been hostile and unloving towards Kyle. But noticing the change in Kyle's behavior around her, Tamara thinks "gosh, does he have feelings for me". She decides to avoid Kyle but Casey notices and forces them to spend time together. Kyle confesses his love and Paterniti explained that Tamara is "stunned" when he accuses her of feeling the same way. Tamara keeps the admission a secret, but Casey's mother, Cheryl Braxton (Suzi Dougherty) notices Kyle's attraction and notifies Casey. Paterniti explained to Miller that Tamara is only interested in Casey, but Kyle admires her when she is formally dressed. As they are at a party, a dramatic alcohol fuelled fight occurs. The actress said that her male co-stars enjoyed filming stunts in the fight scenes. Kyle's feelings manage to unsettle Casey and Tamara's relationship. Kyle makes the situation worse when he kisses Tamara. Paterniti said the kiss is "very one-sided" and she is scared of damage the kiss could cause. But Brax soon discovers Kyle's latest advance. The actress added that "it's the worst thing that could have happened and it brings back all of the tension between the Braxton's again."

In February 2013, Westaway told Amy Harris of The Daily Telegraph that Kyle had some "bigger storylines" in development. The following month Westaway, Peacocke, Younes and Ewing filmed scenes for a bucks party in Melbourne. The location shoot took place in St Kilda, Port Melbourne and Toorak. Series producer Lucy Addario told a reporter from TV Week that "in a misguided attempt at brotherly bonding, Kyle takes his three siblings away to his hometown of Melbourne, to throw a bucks party. Not everything goes to plan as they navigate through an unfamiliar city".

=== Phoebe Nicholson ===
Kyle is surprised when his ex-girlfriend Phoebe Nicholson (Isabella Giovinazzo) arrives in Summer Bay to perform at a music festival he has organised, alongside Tamara. Westaway said Phoebe's arrival would bring out a whole new side of Kyle that is "vibrant and bright" and that he is "scared but excited" by having Phoebe back in his life. Phoebe and Kyle grew up together in Melbourne, they met at school and bonded over a mutual love of music, which eventually led to a romantic relationship described by Westaway and Giovinazzo as "their first and strongest relationship". However, the relationship was cut short by Kyle's disappearance.

=== Departure ===
On 1 April 2016, Jonathan Chancellor from The Daily Telegraph pointed out that Westaway had posted fewer pictures of the Home and Away filming locations on his social media, prompting fans to speculate that he was set to leave the show. Chancellor also noted that Westaway had been seen with "a commemorative photo collage of his scenes", which is usually presented to departing actors. Sophie Dainty of Digital Spy confirmed Westaway had decided to leave the show after almost four years and Kyle departed on 21 April.

Kyle's final storyline saw him take the blame for an armed robbery carried out by his girlfriend Isla Schultz (Samantha Jade). Of Kyle's sacrifice, Westaway commented, "He wants to give Isla a better life. He understands what it is like to be given a second chance." Kyle was given a lengthy prison sentence. He shared "a tender moment" with Phoebe, before he was led away to his cell. Kyle was the last of the Braxton brothers to leave the show.

== Storylines ==
Kyle comes to the Summer Bay caravan park to deliver a gun and fake passport to Danny Braxton. Following Danny's death, Kyle begins tailing Casey Braxton. When Casey and his brother, Brax (Steve Peacocke), go camping in the forest, Kyle follows them. Brax leaves Casey alone to get some food and Kyle kidnaps him. Kyle handcuffs Casey to an old car in the desert. He reveals that he is Danny's son and Casey's half-brother. Tamara helps Casey by giving him water. Brax and Natalie search for Casey and locate Kyle when Tamara throws a flaming petrol can at him, causing an explosion. Casey survives but still fails to appear in court. Brax and Heath travel to Melbourne to find Kyle to help Casey's case. His friend Mackenzie Watson (Kate Jenkinson) takes them to Kyle because she believe it is his chance to get close to his family.

They take Kyle to Summer Bay and force him to testify to help Casey avoid prison. Kyle goes to stay with Adam Sharpe (Martin Lynes) and feels left out. He tells Brax that he wants to be a part of the family and he invites Kyle to move in. Kyle befriends Liam Murphy (Axle Whitehead), but is angry when he catches him stealing from Angelo's. Kyle eventually makes Liam confess out of loyalty to Brax. Kyle develops feelings for Tamara as they continue to work together at Angelo's. Tamara tries to avoid Kyle when she discovers the truth and Casey punches him. Kyle promises to stay away from Tamara. But when the pair talk, Kyle misreads Tamara's intentions and kisses her. Casey takes Kyle to the place he once kidnapped him and talk. They decide to move on after they realise that Danny is the actual cause of their rift. Ricky Sharpe (Bonnie Sveen) transfers $100,000 from Angelo's into Connie Callahan's (Celia Ireland) bank account. Kyle notices the transaction and convinces Kyle that Brax made the transfer and is in financial ruin. Ricky convinces Kyle to take part in illegal deals to help raise money, unbeknown that she is setting him up.

Kyle is torn between his still present feelings for Tamara and loyalty to Casey; when the trauma of being held hostage by Adam causes Tamara to lose her memories of Summer Bay and Casey, and turns to Kyle who she's quickly developed feelings for. He is unable to resist when she acts on her feelings and kisses him, but he pulls away and puts distance between them by moving back in with his brothers leaving Tamara devastated. Desperate for Kyle's love, Tamara confronts him and begs to know if he still loves her, but Kyle is hesitant to answer. However, when Tamara announces her intent to leave Summer Bay, Kyle is unable to bare the thought of her leaving and finally gives into his feelings for her and they sleep together. His guilt over betraying Casey overwhelms him, when Casey apologizes for being angry at him for helping Tamara, and he blows up at Casey telling him that he slept with Tamara.

Kyle and Tamara are now dating. Kyle was devastated when Tamara was going to leave with her parents, so he finally admitted he loves her and she decided to stay. Tamara regained her memories and decided to stay with Kyle, but when Casey was injured in a car accident and it became clear Tamara's feelings for Casey had returned a shattered Kyle ended the relationship. After some awkwardness, Kyle's suggestion that they forget the last 6 months (including their relationship) and Tamara's confession that what they had was special to her, Kyle and Tamara agreed to remain friends.

Kyle confides in Brax about the pain of losing Tamara, and that he wished things went differently for them however also states that he can live with whatever way it goes as he feels that it is the right thing to do. Kyle is devastated when Brax turns himself into the police, after confessing to accidentally killing Johnny Barrett year prior. Seeking comfort, Kyle has a one-night stand with Robyn Sullivan. Kyle faces further heartbreak when Casey and Tamara get back together; however they later break up. Kyle and Tamara team up to organise a music festival to unite the Summer Bay and Mangrove River students. Kyle is surprised when his ex-girlfriend, Phoebe Nicholson, arrives to perform at the festival. He later turns down her advances. Kyle notices Evelyn and Oscar MacGuire being kidnapped and tries to intervene but is overpowered. He is knocked unconscious and taken with them, locked in a shipping container. He was rescued (along with Evelyn and Oscar) by Zac, Hannah, Casey and Tamara.

Phoebe then comes and stay with the Braxtons for a bit and Phoebe and Kyle rekindle their relationship. When Phoebe finds out what Kyle has been doing since he left Melbourne, she is disgusted and gives Kyle an ultimatum - either move back to Melbourne with her or stay in the bay and never see her again. Kyle decided to move back to Melbourne with Phoebe but just before he leaves Brax returns from prison and he decides to stay in the bay which leaves Phoebe disappointed and she leaves the bay without him, ending their relationship.

When the Braxton Brothers leave for London, Brax asks Kyle to look after the family business for him and his brother, Kyle struggles and decides he wants to be with Phoebe, he then closes down Angelo's and the Gym and then goes back to Melbourne to look for Phoebe but he can't find her anywhere. Phoebe turns up in the bay later and they both rekindle their relationship and she decides to stay and accept his brothers for Kyle's sake.

Phoebe's dad Mark Nicholson (Steve Rodgers) arrives in the bay and disapproves of Kyle and Phoebe's relationship once he finds out his surname was changed from Bennett to Braxton. As a lawyer, he looks into Kyle and his family's past and warns Phoebe that Kyle is not good for her. Phoebe tells Mark that she knows everything and disagrees with what her dad thinks, which makes Mark mad and causes him to hire someone to put a bullet through the Braxton share house and later hires someone to trash the house which ends up with Kyle in hospital. Kyle later returns to work but is sent home by Phoebe and Brax, while on his way home he sees his attacker talking to Phoebe's dad. He then realises that it has been her dad doing the attacks on the Braxtons and informs Ricky and Brax.

Later, after a surprising proposal by Kyle, Phoebe broke up with him and started dating Ash, Kyle went to Melbourne and got himself involved in legal Gambling and later got beaten up and on his return to Summer Bay he had kidney problems and later recovered, Kyle then found out Phoebe was pregnant with Kyle's twins. After Phoebe miscarried, Kyle got drunk and made pass at Maddy, who had started working at Angelo's. and feeling very remorseful and regretful he told Ricky he would be definitely saying sorry to Maddy and for his actions on night before and reassure Maddy and Ruth that nothing like that would ever happen again and he never meant to look at her as easy prey but dealing with grief over loss of becoming father with Phoebe baby, Later on Kyle had brief thing with Charlotte until he found out she was connected with Gunno and Kyle save Kat after Charlotte spike her drink, Later Kyle meets Isla Schultz (Samantha Jade), who told him that Dave, a man Kyle owed money wants the money back or he will threaten Kyle's family. Later, after he and Isla were kidnapped, Kyle subdued Dave and got him arrested. Later, he saw Isla had two daughters and had no custody of them. After Isla robbed a sports bar, Kyle created a diversion so she could escape, but he gets arrested. Before going to court, he plants his fingerprints on Isla's gun and the money she stole to keep her out of trouble and he was found guilty and sentenced to eight years imprisonment with five more added due to breaking his good behaviour bond.

== Reception ==
Kyle, Phoebe and Ash (George Mason) won the 2015 TV Week and Soap Extra #OMGAward for Best Love Triangle. The Daily Telegraph's Amy Harris said that Kyle was "a new but increasingly popular addition to the cast". A reporter from TV Magazine said "asif Kyle hasn't caused enough grief for Casey by kidnapping him, he now has his eye on his half-brother's girlfriend Tamara." Westaway was a candidate for the "Most Popular New Male Talent" award at the 2013 Logie Awards. Miller from TV Week suggested that Kyle was not a good brother to Casey, opining that "obviously Kyle didn't get the bro code handbook when he decided to stay in Summer Bay. Inside Soap decided that the desert kidnap was the best storyline broadcast in the UK during November 2012. A reporter added that it was "one of the show's most spectacular and ambitious storylines ever." Laura Morgan from All About Soap has branded Kyle as a "crazy bad boy". TV Week later named Westaway one of the "rising stars of 2013" due to the role.
