= 50 Ways of Saying Fabulous =

2005 New Zealand drama film

- Theatrical release poster
- Directed by: Stewart Main
- Written by: Graeme Aitken (novel); Stewart Main
- Produced by: Michele Fantl
- Starring: Andrew Patterson; Jay Collins
- Cinematography: Simon Raby
- Edited by: Peter Roberts
- Music by: Peter Scholes
- Distributed by: Olive Films
- Release date: 8 September 2005 (Toronto)
- Running time: 90 minutes
- Country: New Zealand
- Language: English

50 Ways of Saying Fabulous is a 2005 New Zealand drama film directed by gay director Stewart Main and starring Jay Collins and Andrew Patterson. It is based on a novel by Graeme Aitken. The film premiered at the 2005 Toronto International Film Festival. It received negative reviews and had little success at the New Zealand box office. In spite of this, the film did however win the Special Jury Award at Italy's Turin International Gay and Lesbian Film Festival in 2005.

== Premise ==
The film deals with a young farmer's son named Billy, who does not appreciate his terrestrial life, and instead wishes to explore outer space. As the story develops, Billy struggles with his homosexuality and his changing relationships with those around him.

== Cast ==
- Andrew Patterson as Billy/Lana
- Harriet Beattie as Lou/Brad
- Jay Collins as Roy
- Georgia McNeil as Babe
- Michael Dorman as Jamie
- Rima Te Wiata as Evey
- George Mason as Arch
- Ross McKellar as Matt
- Stephanie McKellar-Smith as Reebie
- David Sullivan as Stuart
- Ben Short as Glen
- Michelle O'Brien as Belinda Pepper
- Fiona Edgar as Teacher
- Kevin Wymer as Mr. Shulter
- Ian Fraser as Referee
