= Lynne McGranger =

Australian soap actress

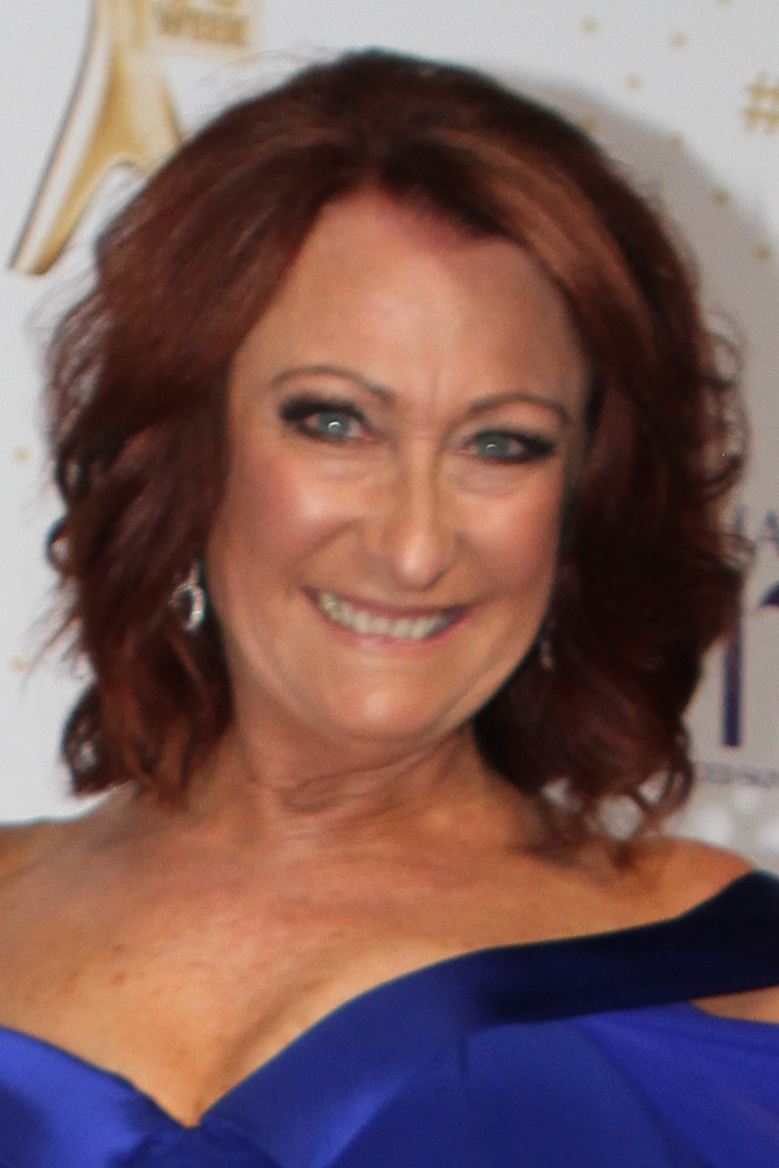
- Lynne McGranger at the 2016 Logie Awards
- Born: 29 January 1953 (age 73); Paddington, New South Wales, Australia
- Occupation: Actress
- Years active: 1989–present
- Known for: Irene Roberts in Home And Away
- Spouse: Paul McWaters (m. 1991)
- Children: 1

Lynne McGranger (born 29 January 1953) is an Australian actress, who rose to prominence for her portrayal as Irene Roberts on the Australian soap opera Home and Away for over 32 years. She joined the series in 1993, and is the longest serving female cast member of a television soap opera in Australia. McGranger announced her departure from Home and Away on 23 February 2025. In August that year, she won the Gold Logie Award for Most Popular Personality on Australian Television.

== Career ==
McGranger was born to Bruce and Audrey. She originally was a primary school teacher who trained at the Riverina College of Advanced Education in Wagga Wagga, New South Wales, in 1975 where she had her initial actor training. She started her career in stage roles, early roles included Rose in Bye Bye Birdie and Anita in West Side Story. After further experience with the Q Theatre in Penrith, west of Sydney, she started working in television and won a small part in soap opera The Flying Doctors.

She undertook her best-known role on 12 January 1993, when she joined the cast of Home and Away playing Irene Roberts. At first cast in a guest role, McGranger was made a permanent cast member on 7 October 1993. In 2014 McGranger overtook former co-star Kate Ritchie as the longest serving actress to play the same character in Australian television.

McGranger was a participant in the fourteenth season of Dancing with the Stars.

On 23 February 2025, McGranger announced her departure from Home and Away. She would film her final scenes at the end of March, and her on-screen exit aired on 19 August. McGranger confirmed she made the decision after appearing in a production of musical comedy The Grandparents Club in 2024 and she said that it was a "full circle moment". On-screen, Irene is diagnosed with Alzheimer's disease and McGranger revealed that she wanted her character's exit to "matter", and wanted it to be educational and important for those who had suffered from Alzheimer's.

On 16 June 2025, McGranger received a nomination for the Gold Logie Award and the Logie Award for Best Actress. On 3 August, McGranger won both accolades. After taking some time off to travel, McGranger began appearing in a new touring season of The Grandparents Club. She also made an appearance on the health and lifestyle series The House of Wellness in September 2025.

On 21 February 2026, McGranger was confirmed to have joined the Channel Nine reality series Shark!. During a dive on the production of the show McGranger was medically evacuated after struggling with buoyancy and a mask filling with water.

== Personal life ==
McGranger was born in the Sydney suburb of Paddington in 1953. She has one daughter, Clancy (b. 1991), with her husband of more than thirty years, Paul McWaters. She is a fan of cricket, and is also interested in history. McGranger is also a supporter of the Sydney Swans.

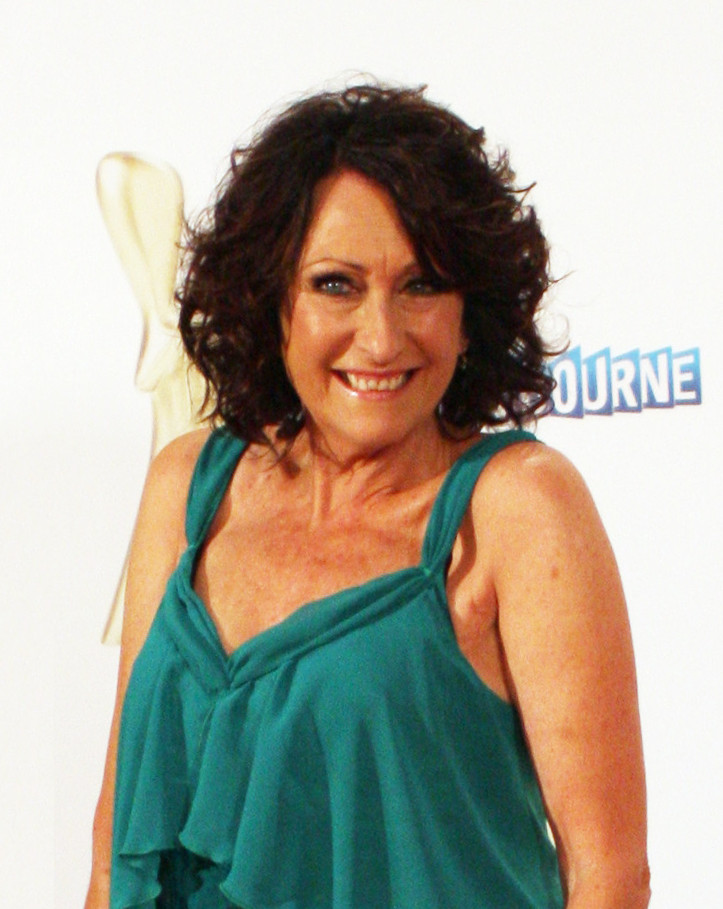
Lynne McGranger in 2009

== Acting credits ==
Film and television performances
Year	Title	Role	Notes
1989	The Flying Doctors	Janet Williams	Guest role
1990	Skirts	Dot	Guest role
1991	Street Angels	Joan	TV film
1993–2025	Home and Away	Irene Roberts	Series regular: 4944 Episodes
1993	Seven Deadly Sins		Guest role
1994	Sky Trackers	Jack	Guest role
2006	Reasons Beyond Me	Lyn	Short film
2012	Gingers	Redheaded Mother	Short film
2015	Home and Away: An Eye for an Eye	Irene Roberts	Main role
2016	Home and Away: Revenge	Irene Roberts	Main role
2017	Home and Away: All or Nothing	Irene Roberts	Main role
2018	Why Can't I	Mother	Short film
2019	Equivocal Redemption	Samantha's Mother	Film
2021	Equivocal Redemption: The Series	Samantha's Mother	Miniseries
2026	Shark!	Self	Reality Series: 3 Episodes

Theatre performances
Year	Title	Role	Theatre/company
1979	Paradise Regained	Lust	Q Theatre
1980	Happy End	Fly	Q Theatre
1984	Bleedin' Butterflies	Christine	M.R.P.G.
1985	Around the Bend	John Hepworth	M.R.P.G.
1986	Luck of the Draw	Dianne	Playbox Theatre
1988	Dags in Full Flight	May Day	Le Joke
1989	Jack's Daughters	Pat	Melbourne Workers Theatre
1989	The Natural Normans	Norman Norman	Edinburgh Festival Fringe
1991	Inside Out	Kat	Anthill Theatre
1992	Daily Grind	Louie	Melbourne Workers Theatre
1995	Dick Whittington	Fairy Bowbells	Brighton Dome
1998	Jack and the Beanstalk	Fairy Peapod	Grand Opera House, York
2000	Aladdin	Genie of the Ring	Tameside Hippodrome
2004	Pinter's – The Lover	Sarah	The Acting Factory
2004	Cinderella	Fairy Godmother	Theatre Royal, Lincoln
2006	Cinderella	Fairy Godmother	White Rock Theatre
2007	Honey	Mum	Riverside Theatres
2008	Jack & the Beanstalk	Fairy Godmother	Lyceum Theatre, Crewe
2010	Jack & the Beanstalk	Wicked Witch	Kings Theatre, Southsea
2012	The Vagina Monologues	Old Jewish Woman	Livid Productions
2012	Jack & the Beanstalk	Fleshcreep	Weymouth Pavilion
2024	The Grandparents Club	Liz	National tour: 7 Weeks
2025	The Grandparents Club 2	Liz	National tour: 10 Weeks
2026	Christmas in The Grandparents Club	Liz	National tour: 7 Weeks

== Awards and nominations ==
Year	Award	Category	Work	Result	Ref.
1974	Wagga Wagga Drama Festival	Best Actress		Won	
2016	Inside Soap Awards	Best Daytime Star	Home and Away	Nominated	
2017	Inside Soap Awards	Best Daytime Star	Home and Away	Nominated	
2023	Logie Awards	Most Popular Actress	Home and Away	Nominated	
2025	Logie Awards	Best Lead Actress in a Drama	Home and Away	Won	
2025	Logie Awards	Gold Logie Award for Most Popular Personality on Australian Television	Home and Away	Won	

== Honours and recognition ==
In 2023, McGranger's Home and Away character Irene Roberts came second in TV Week's 100 Greatest Australian TV Characters, behind Ray Meagher's Alf Stewart.
