= Kelly Paterniti =

Australian actress

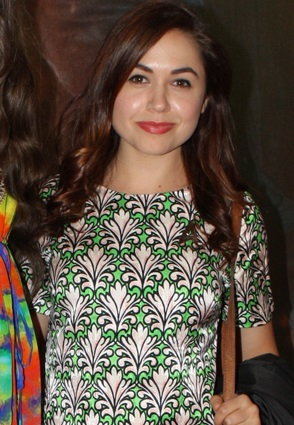
- Born: 6 December 1987 (age 38); Perth, Western Australia, Australia
- Occupation: Actress
- Years active: 2006–present
- Notable work: Home and Away (2012–14)

Kelly Paterniti (born 6 December 1987) is an Australian actress. She is most notable for her role as Tamara Kingsley on the Australian television soap opera Home and Away.

== Early life and career ==
Paterniti was born in 1987 and grew up in Perth, Western Australia with two other siblings. She became involved with dramatic arts from an early age, and at the age of 13 enrolled at the John Curtin College of the Arts, a high school in Fremantle, Western Australia. Following her graduation from the college, Paterniti furthered her studies at Curtin University, where she performed in many theatrical productions including Romeo and Juliet, Cloudstreet and The Trojan Women. While still attending the university, she appeared in a short film Some Dreams Come True, and was cast in the children's television series' Wormwood, and Stormworld, an Australian-Canadian sci-fi series.

In 2009, Paterniti appeared in a recurring role as "Summer" in the Seven Network series Packed to the Rafters during its second season. She received her first lead role in the short-lived police drama series Cops L.A.C., which starred Kate Ritchie. Paterniti has been cast in three Australian feature films. In 2010, she appeared in Griff the Invisible, Sleeping Beauty in 2011, and Redd Inc. in 2012, in the leading female role.

Paterniti had a lead role in the Seven Network soap opera Home and Away, playing Tamara Kingsley. The character first appeared in the episode that aired on 1 October 2012, during the series' twenty-fifth season. Her character's first storyline saw her trying to save Casey Braxton (Lincoln Younes), who had been kidnapped by his brother Kyle Braxton (Nic Westaway). Paterniti was later promoted to the main cast. She decided to leave the series at end of 2013 to pursue new acting roles, and made her final screen appearance as Tamara on 21 May 2014.

Paterniti has performed in many theatrical productions in Sydney. She received critical acclaim for her performance as Helen in David Williamson's The Emerald City for Griffin Theatre Company in 2014. In 2015 she played the role of Celia in Bell Shakespeare's production of As You Like It. In 2016 she played Juliet in Bell Shakespeare's Romeo and Juliet. Her portrayal of the character was described as "chatty, lively, straightforward and very amusing" and in the character's transition from "doe-eyed innocent to young woman defining herself against her family...a thrill to watch."

== Personal life ==
Paterniti is a vegetarian and an animal activist. She is an ambassador for the Starlight Movie Month, which helps to raise money for seriously ill children.

== Filmography ==
| Year | Title | Role | Notes |
|---|---|---|---|
| 2006 | Some Dreams Come True | Julia | Short film |
| 2007 | Wormwood | Danni Bourke | Main role; 12 episodes |
| 2009 | Stormworld | Gar Lindi | 8 episodes |
| 2009 | Packed to the Rafters | Summer | 4 episodes |
| 2010 | Griff the Invisible | Gina | Feature film |
| 2010 | Cops L.A.C. | Priscilla Smith | Main role; 13 episodes |
| 2011 | Sleeping Beauty | Female Student in Bathroom | Feature film |
| 2011 | The Example | Sam | Short film |
| 2012 | Redd Inc. | Annabelle Hale | Feature film Alternative title - "Inhuman Resources" |
| 2013 | Fruit | Evie | Short film |
| 2012–2014 | Home and Away | Tamara Kingsley | Main role |
| 2015 | Australia: The Story of Us | Flora | 1 episode |
