= Home and Away: An Eye for an Eye =

- Promotional image for An Eye for an Eye featuring Dan Ewing as Heath Braxton
- Written by: Sarah Walker
- Directed by: Arnie Custo
- Starring: Bonnie Sveen; Dan Ewing; Lisa Gormley; George Mason; Nic Westaway; Kyle Pryor; Isabella Giovinazzo; Pia Miller; Lynne McGranger; Leeanna Walsman; Diarmid Heidenreich
- Composer: Michael Yezerski
- Country of origin: Australia
- Original language: English

Production
- Executive producers: John Holmes; Julie McGauran
- Producer: Lucy Addario
- Cinematography: Bob Miller
- Editor: Stafford Jackson Wales
- Running time: 66 minutes
- Production company: Seven Productions

Original release
- Network: Presto
- Release: 9 December 2015

Related
- Home and Away; Home and Away: Revenge

Home and Away: An Eye for an Eye is a television film and spin-off of the Australian soap opera Home and Away, written by Sarah Walker and directed by Arnie Custo. It premiered on 9 December 2015 on streaming service Presto, following the season finale of Home and Away, the first local production commissioned for Presto. The idea for a special was suggested during talks about a joint venture between Presto and the Seven Network. The network's CEO hoped An Eye for an Eye would keep regular viewers of Home and Away interested while the show was off air, while also attracting a new audience to Presto.

The plot centres on the kidnapping of Ricky Sharpe (Bonnie Sveen) and Darryl Braxton's (Stephen Peacocke) infant son Casey by Brax's enemy Trevor "Gunno" Gunson (Diarmid Heidenreich). Former Home and Away actors Dan Ewing and Lisa Gormley reprised their roles of Heath Braxton and Bianca Scott especially for the telefilm. An Eye for an Eye was filmed at the Seven Network studios in Eveleigh, Palm Beach in Sydney, the town of Blackheath, and across the Blue Mountains. More crew members were brought in to help out, while many of the cast members had to fit in filming around their Home and Away schedules.

Ahead of the episode's premiere, Presto's subscribers grew by 300 per cent within a seven-day period, causing Presto to upgrade their servers to cope with the demand. An Eye for an Eye broke all day one streaming records on Presto. It received a positive response from critics. Stephen Downie of TV Week thought fans of Home and Away would love it and he praised Sveen's performance, while a writer for Inside Soap said the drama would have viewers on the edge of their seats. Following the success of An Eye for an Eye, two more specials were commissioned, and they aired on Foxtel in 2016 and 2017 respectively.

== Plot ==
Ricky Sharpe is in shock after learning that her partner Darryl "Brax" Braxton is alive, after faking his death. Martin Ashford and Phoebe Nicholson check on Ricky, and Ash explains that Brax was trying to protect Ricky and their son Casey from his enemy Gunno. Robert Massey, an associate of Gunno's, hears the conversation via a microphone hidden in the house. He calls the prison to tell inmate Michael Tiat that Brax is alive. Michael informs Gunno, who is then stabbed in his cell. His girlfriend and prison nurse, Virginia Eisak, helps him escape. Meanwhile, Brax's brother Heath and his wife Bianca come to support Ricky. When her fiancé Nate Cooper calls her, Ricky feigns illness and tells him not to come over.

The following morning, Ricky sees Casey's empty cot and assumes Bianca took him, so she could sleep. However, she soon learns that no one has seen Casey. Gunno then calls Ricky and tells her that he wants $50,000 by 5:00 pm or she will never see Casey again. Ash, Heath and Kyle Braxton decide to go after Gunno, while Bianca and Phoebe help Ricky to raise the ransom. Constable Katarina Chapman learns of Gunno's escape and warns Ricky, but her odd reaction raises Kat's suspicions. Bianca asks her friend Irene Roberts for a loan, while Ricky asks Nate for money to pay a debt. Irene and Nate soon work out that the requests are connected, and Irene confronts Bianca, who asks her to trust her.

Virginia notices that Casey has a fever and drives into Blackheath to get him paracetamol from the pharmacy. Ash recognises her and he, Heath and Kyle follow her car, but lose her when she turns off the road. Nate lends Ricky some money and she promises to tell him what is going on as soon as she can. Ash, Heath and Kyle return to the town to ask the locals if they have seen Virginia or Gunno. The pharmacist recognises Virginia and tells them where she is, but they find the shack empty. Gunno brings the ransom deadline forward and Heath and Kyle decide to return home, while Ash stays behind.

Gunno meets with Ricky, but when he realises that the money is short a few thousand dollars, he drives off with Casey. The girls manage to track him using Bianca's phone, which they put in the bag with the money. Gunno returns to the shack and takes Ash hostage. He also finds the phone and realises Heath and Kyle know where he is. Heath chases after Gunno, while Ash and Kyle go after Virginia and rescue Casey. Heath and Gunno fight on top of a cliff, and Gunno goes over the side. He grabs Heath's arm, but Heath lets go, so Gunno will no longer be a threat to his family. Ricky is reunited with Casey, while Gunno is shown to still be alive after his fall.

== Cast ==
(In order of appearance)

- Bonnie Sveen as Ricky Sharpe
- Sebastian Sloan, Xavier Sloan, Phoenix Lumsden as Baby Casey
- Panda Likoudis as Robert Massey
- Isabella Giovinazzo as Phoebe Nicholson
- George Mason as Martin Ashford
- Lucas Connolly as Michael Tiat
- Diarmid Heidenreich as Trevor Gunson
- Nic Westaway as Kyle Braxton
- Leeanna Walsman as Virginia Eisak
- Brendan Clearkin as Guard Parker
- Lynne McGranger as Irene Roberts
- Kyle Pryor as Nate Cooper
- Dan Ewing as Heath Braxton
- Lisa Gormley as Bianca Scott
- Pia Miller as Katarina Chapman
- Andrew Cutcliffe as Radio Newsreader
- James Lugton as Pharmacist

== Production ==
=== Conception and development ===
On 19 August 2015, a writer for If Magazine reported that streaming service Presto had commissioned their first Australian production titled Home and Away: An Eye for an Eye. The television film is a spin-off of the long-running soap opera Home and Away. Brendan Moo, the head of content and acquisitions for Presto, said the idea of creating a Home and Away special was broached during talks about a joint venture between Presto and the Seven Network, which broadcasts Home and Away. Tim Worner, the CEO of the Seven Network, hoped An Eye for an Eye would be "warmly embraced" by fans of the soap, while also attracting a new audience to Presto. He added that the special had been "specifically crafted" to keep regular viewers excited about Home and Away while it was off air for the summer.

Home and Away series producer Lucy Addario told Dan Barrett of MediaWeek that the telefilm was similar to producing three additional episodes of the soap. Addario had to bring in more crew members to help out. The plot for An Eye for an Eye gave the crew the chance to do things differently to the usual Home and Away format, as they were only following one plot line. Addario explained, "Because in Home and Away you're following 23+ characters, we're always telling three to four stories in every episode. In the special, we're actually following the one story. You actually get momentum from one scene to the next. You don't have to cut away to another story."

As the special was produced for a streaming platform, it did not have to adhere to Home and Away's PG classification, but the production team wanted to keep it PG, so regular viewers of the show would not be put off. Addario commented that they were "respecting" the show's brand. Moo stated that An Eye for an Eye would never be broadcast on Seven, as it was exclusive to Presto. Daniel Kilkelly of Digital Spy confirmed that An Eye for an Eye would be available to view on Presto following the 2015 season finale of Home and Away on Seven. Actor Nic Westaway, who portrays Kyle Braxton, said the events that take place in An Eye for an Eye would not affect the storylines featured in Home and Away.

Details of the plot were released in November 2015. An Eye for an Eye focuses on the kidnap of Ricky Sharpe (Bonnie Sveen) and Darryl "Brax" Braxton's (Steve Peacocke) infant son Casey by Brax's enemy, Trevor "Gunno" Gunson (Diarmid Heidenreich). Kyle, Heath Braxton (Dan Ewing) and Martin Ashford (George Mason) search for Casey, while Ricky, Bianca Scott (Lisa Gormley) and Phoebe Nicholson (Isabella Giovinazzo) try to raise the money to pay Gunno's ransom demand. Sveen said the plot was "an actor's dream" to play. She added, "In the world of Home And Away, which has to switch between storylines, it was massive for me to just drive this. I felt a little bit like the CEO of a business or something."

=== Casting ===
Following the announcement of An Eye for an Eye, it was also reported that former Home and Away actors Dan Ewing and Lisa Gormley would be reprising their roles of Heath Braxton and Bianca Scott respectively. Ewing felt that he was still familiar with his character, so he did not have to do a lot of preparation. But he decided that he wanted to lose some weight for the role. He commented, "I don't want to say 'Dad-bod', but I'd certainly gotten comfortable. I just had to drop a few." Ewing called An Eye for An Eye "really innovative" and added that being able to appear in it was what tempted him back to Home and Away. Gormley had just finished appearing in a play in Sydney when she was approached about making a return. She told TV Week's Stephen Downie that she found it easy to get back into character.

As well as Ewing and Gormley, the telefilm also features regular cast members Nic Westaway, Bonnie Sveen, George Mason, Isabella Giovinazzo, Kyle Pryor (Nate Cooper) Pia Miller (Kat Chapman) and Lynne McGranger (Irene Roberts). Diarmid Heidenreich reprised his role of Trevor "Gunno" Gunson from Home and Away. Gunno is a criminal, who previously tried to kill Ricky's partner Darryl Braxton. Actress Leeanna Walsman was cast as Gunno's girlfriend and accomplice Virginia Eisak. One year old twins Sebastian and Xavier Sloan shared the role of Ricky's young son Casey.

=== Filming ===
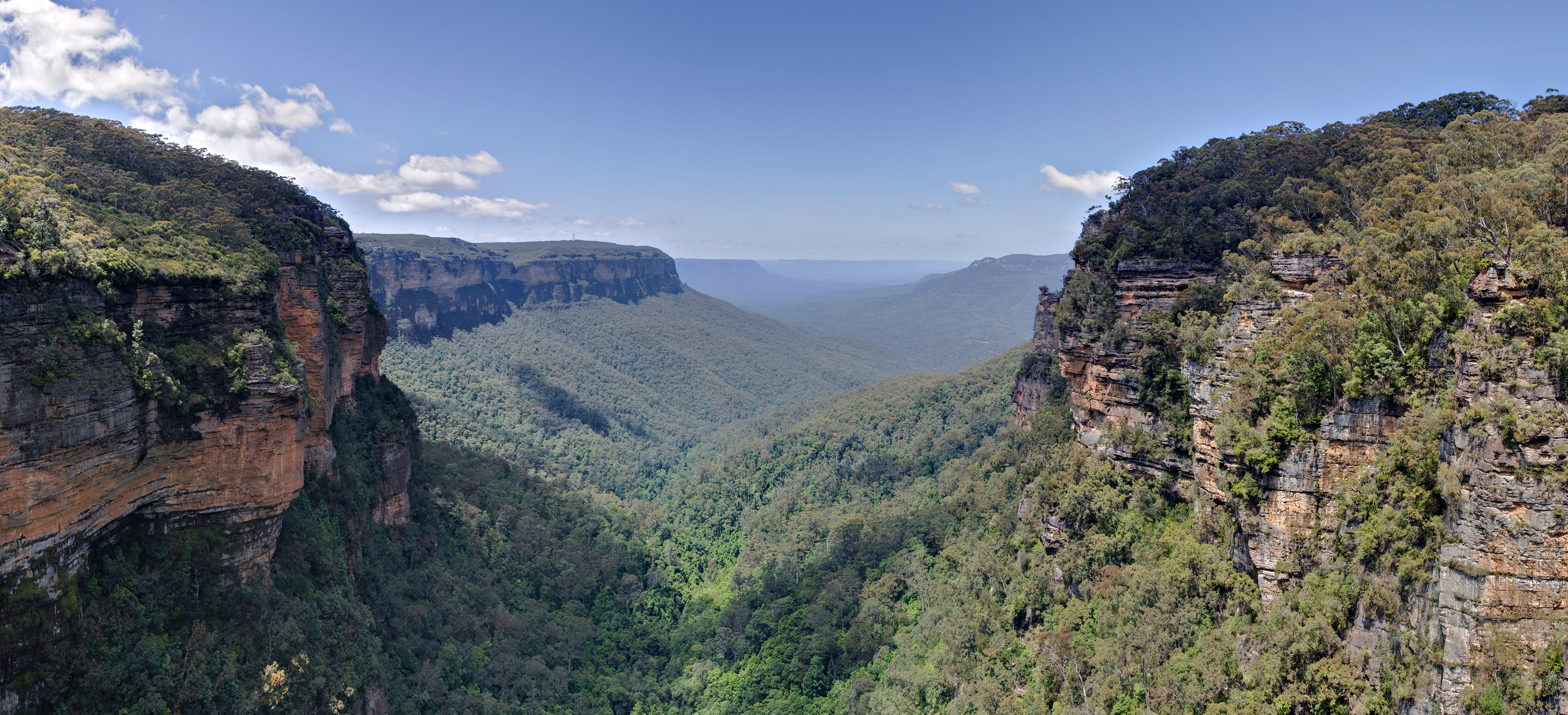
Several scenes for An Eye for An Eye were shot in the Blue Mountains

Filming for the spin-off took place at the Channel Seven studios in Eveleigh, Palm Beach in Sydney, and across the Blue Mountains. The cast and crew spent a week filming in the Blue Mountains. Westaway stated, "That was really exciting, it was probably the biggest chunk of that project we shot in one go. We shot a bit before and a lot after." Ewing, Mason and Westaway also filmed scenes in the town of Blackheath at the start of September. Westaway, and some of the other cast members, had to fit in filming for the special around their Home and Away schedules. The actor said it was "a bit of a challenge", as they had to remember the chronological order of scenes and where they were in their respective storylines.

An Eye for An Eye was filmed in 4K ultra-high-definition and produced by Seven Productions. Westaway explained to Sue Yeap of The West Australian that there was more time to shoot An Eye for an Eye compared to the filming schedule of Home and Away, and the set-ups were "more elaborate". Ewing and Gormley agreed that An Eye for An Eye had a faster pace compared to the regular episodes. Ewing also said the telefilm had an "edge to it" that he had not had a chance to experience in the main show before. Sveen also said that the scenes were shot differently, and used various filters and angles which gave it a different look to regular Home and Away episodes.

== Broadcast ==
Home and Away: An Eye for an Eye had its premiere on Presto on 9 December 2015 at 8:30 pm. It was preceded by thirty episodes of Home and Away, featuring the most popular births, deaths and marriages as voted for by viewers. An Eye for an Eye aired on the TV2 channel in New Zealand. It was broadcast in the United Kingdom on digital station 5Star and Channel 5 on 17 and 21 March respectively. The spin-off was broadcast as three 30-minute episodes on RTÉ One and RTÉ2 in Ireland.

== Reception ==
=== Ratings ===
Ahead of the episode's premiere, Presto's subscribers grew by 300 per cent within a seven-day period. Presto upgraded their servers to cope with the demand. In its original broadcast, Home and Away: An Eye for an Eye accounted for over 55 per cent of Presto's total streaming between 8:30 pm and 12:00 am. The telefilm broke all day one streaming records on Presto. Michael Bodey of The Australian reported that An Eye for an Eye received more than 1.6 million views. In its UK broadcast on 5Star, it was seen by 490,000 viewers, making it the sixth most-watched show on the channel for that week.

=== Critical response ===
Stephen Downie of TV Week gave the spin-off a positive review, noting that it was "not merely an extended episode of the show." He thought the look and tone was darker than usual, and liked that the plot was not interrupted by other storylines. Downie went on to praise Sveen's performance, believing it to be her best in the role of Ricky. He added "Fast and furious, An Eye for an Eye is a fantastic heart-in-mouth chase from beginning to end. Fans will love it."

Downie's colleague Thomas Woodgate wrote that some people had claimed the episode was "a genius marketing ploy" by Presto to get subscriptions at the expense of the show's fans. But Woodgate thought Presto had to act, as they were competing with other streaming services, such as Netflix and Stan, which also invests in local content. Of the episode, Woodgate opined: "a grittier feel, a change in production values and a newish story means it will stand alone".

An Inside Soap columnist commented that the spin-off was "much anticipated" ahead of its UK broadcast. They also said "the high-octane drama will leave viewers on the edge of their seats". Sue Yeap of The West Australian said Home and Away broke "new ground" with the telefilm. Fiona Flynn of entertainment.ie chose the special as her TV Highlight of the week. She was pleased to see Heath back and stated "these next few days are going to be HIGH DRAMA. Let's just hope we don't lose any more Braxtons, we STILL can't quite believe Casey is gone." Ellen Moorhead from The Spinoff noted, "With the show haemorrhaging thousands of viewers per episode earlier in the year, this is obviously a ploy to keep people hooked over summer. And I am so into it."

== Sequels and novels ==
Following the success of Home and Away: An Eye for An Eye, it was announced on 6 May 2016 that two more feature-length episodes had been commissioned. Home and Away: Revenge and Home and Away: All or Nothing aired on Foxtel, following the closure of Presto, on 19 December 2016 and 26 January 2017 respectively. Both Ewing and Gormley reprised their roles once again for the specials. Two novels, one of which ties in with An Eye for an Eye, were later released by Hachette Australia.
