= George Mason (actor) =

New Zealand actor

- Born: 1991 or 1992 (age 34–35); Invercargill, New Zealand
- Occupation: Actor
- Years active: 2005–present
- Spouse: Manon Buchalet (m. 2021)

George Mason is a New Zealand film and television actor. He secured his first role in the feature film 50 Ways of Saying Fabulous when he was thirteen years old. After deciding to pursue acting full-time, Mason appeared as Regan Ames in Shortland Street in 2011, before making appearances in Tangiwai: A Love Story, Top of the Lake and 3 Mile Limit. In 2013, Mason starred as Ted Keegan in the fifth season of Go Girls and he had a supporting role in crime drama The Blue Rose. From 2014 until 2018, Mason appeared in Australian soap opera Home and Away as Martin Ashford. He later starred in the musical feature film Daffodils (2019) and romantic drama Dirt Music (2020). Mason has also appeared in Australian dramas One Night, Black Snow, and The Survivors. He will play the lead in the 2026 drama series Run.

== Early and personal life ==
Mason was born and raised in Invercargill. He has two elder sisters. He attended Southland Boys' High School, where he played rugby union for the Southland Boys' High School 1st XV and competed in speech competitions. Mason moved to Wellington in 2009 to study a Bachelor of Performing Arts at the Toi Whakaari New Zealand Drama School.

Mason became engaged to his partner, French model Manon Buchalet in 2016. They married in 2021.

== Career ==
Mason was thirteen years old when a family friend encouraged him to audition for a role in the 2005 drama film 50 Ways of Saying Fabulous. Mason won the role of school bully Arch, and the film marked his first acting job. It also inspired him to pursue acting as a full-time career. In 2011, Mason flew himself to Auckland from Arrowtown to audition for the recurring role of Regan Ames in the New Zealand medical drama Shortland Street. Mason had a second audition and learned he had secured the part as he was boarding his flight home. He filmed his first scenes in February and made his first appearance as Regan on 15 April 2011. Mason described his character as "the new bad boy on the block."

Mason had a small role in the television film Tangiwai: A Love Story, which dramatises the Tangiwai disaster. He followed this with a supporting role in the 2013 New Zealand crime drama The Blue Rose, alongside Antonia Prebble. That same year, he made a guest appearance in the mystery drama Top of the Lake. Mason also appeared in the feature film 3 Mile Limit, which tells the story of pirate radio station Radio Hauraki.

Mason joined the cast of comedy-drama Go Girls in 2012. He attended around five auditions, before he was cast as the show's narrator, Ted Keegan, for the fifth season, which aired in 2013. When Go Girls was cancelled at the end of the season, Mason tried to find work in Los Angeles and Sydney. He then relocated to Melbourne, where he worked as a nanny and a labourer. Mason decided to contact fellow New Zealand actor Danielle Cormack and her agent secured him an audition for a Channel 7 pilot. The show was not picked up, but he was then asked to audition for the role of Martin "Ash" Ashford in the soap opera Home and Away. Mason's character was introduced as a friend of established character Darryl Braxton (Steve Peacocke) in October 2014. Mason reprised his role as Ash in three feature length specials; Home and Away: An Eye for an Eye (2015), Home and Away: Revenge (2016), and Home and Away: All or Nothing (2017).

In 2017, Mason secured his first modelling job with underwear and clothing brand Bonds. In April 2018, Mason confirmed that he had filmed his final scenes for Home and Away, which aired later that year. That same year, he filmed the musical feature Daffodils. The film, based on a stage play by Rochelle Bright, was released on 21 March 2019. Mason stars as Eric, alongside Rose McIver as his love interest Rose, and singer Kimbra. He also joined the cast of Dirt Music, a film adaptation of Tim Winton's novel of the same name, alongside Garrett Hedlund and Kelly Macdonald. It was filmed in Western Australia. Mason also guested in episodes of My Life Is Murder and Barons.

Mason appeared in the Jane Campion's 2021 film The Power of the Dog, followed by roles in the Paramount+ series One Night as Joey, thriller Exposure, and Last Days of the Space Age. On 11 July 2024, Mason joined the cast of the Stan Australia series Sunny Nights. The following year, he appeared in the second season of Black Snow and The Survivors. He was also cast in the lead role of bank robber Brenden Abbott (aka The Postcard Bandit) in the 2026 Binge drama series Run. On 2 February 2026, Mason was named in the extended cast for SBS series The Airport Chaplain.

== Filmography ==
=== Film ===
Year	Title	Role	Notes
2005	50 Ways of Saying Fabulous	Arch	
2010	Choice Night	Wardy	Short film
2014	3 Mile Limit	Bobbie	
2019	Daffodils	Eric	
2020	Dirt Music	Darkie	
2021	The Power of the Dog	Cricket	
2022	James Squire: Ordinary Be Damned	James Squire	Short film
2024	Medicine	Jack	Short film

=== Television ===
Year	Title	Role	Notes
2011	Shortland Street	Regan Ames	Recurring role
2011	Tangiwai: A Love Story	Matt Poore	TV film
2013	Top of the Lake	Guy 1	Episode: "The Dark Creator"
2013	The Blue Rose	Ben Gallagher	Recurring
2013	Go Girls	Ted Keegan	Main cast
2014–2018	Home and Away	Martin Ashford	Series regular
2015	Home and Away: An Eye for an Eye	Martin Ashford	TV film
2016	Home and Away: Revenge	Martin Ashford	TV film
2017	Home and Away: All or Nothing	Martin Ashford	TV film
2021	The Gulf	Kris Keegan	Episodes: "Inheritance" (Parts 1 & 2)
2021	My Life Is Murder	Craig Ashford	Episode: "Oceans Apart"
2022	Barons	The Wizard	Episode: "375 Miles From The Surf"
2023	One Night	Joey Calley	Main cast
2024	Exposure	Mick	3 episodes
2024	Last Days of the Space Age	Mike Bissett	8 episodes
2025	Black Snow	Ritchie Cormack	
2025	The Survivors	Ash Carter	
2025	Sunny Nights	Pete	
2026	Run	Brenden Abbott	Main cast
2026	The Airport Chaplain	TBA	TV series
