= Foxtel Now =

Australian subscription video-on-demand service

- Former name: Foxtel Play (2013–2017)
- Company type: Subsidiary
- Website type: Over-the-top media service
- Available in: English
- Predecessor: Presto
- Headquarters: Sydney, New South Wales, Australia
- Area served: Australia
- Owner: Foxtel
- Products: Streaming media; Video on demand
- Services: Film distribution; Television distribution
- Website: foxtel.com.au/now
- Registration: Required
- Users: ▼177,000 (as of 30 June 2023)
- Launched: 11 August 2013; 13 years ago
- Current status: Active

Foxtel Now (formerly Foxtel Play) is an Australian internet television service which offers subscriptions to over 50 live channels and hundreds of video on-demand titles. The service is owned by Foxtel, and officially launched on 11 August 2013 as Foxtel Play.

The service is available on internet connected devices such as computers, game consoles and selected smart TV's and Blu-ray players. In addition, Foxtel Now subscribers have access to Foxtel's Foxtel Go app for smart phones and tablets.

== History ==
On 14 March 2013 at the Australian Subscription Television and Radio Association (ASTRA) conference, Foxtel CEO Patrick Delany announced that in August 2013 the company would launch a new service named Foxtel Play. The service is an internet television alternative to Foxtel's existing cable and satellite pay television service, allowing consumers to subscribe without a lock-in contract and access it via a range of internet compatible devices (as opposed to requiring a new iQ4 set-top box).

The service launched on 30 July 2013, nearly two weeks ahead of its official launch of 11 August 2013. At launch, the service offered over 40 live channels and hundreds of video on demand titles, with subscriptions starting at $25 a month and 6 subscription packages on offer.

Australian singer Guy Sebastian was the ambassador for Foxtel Play.

In October 2016, Foxtel CEO Patrick Delany announced that Foxtel Play would receive a new package structure with lower pricing from December that year, to coincide with the company's closure of streaming service Presto. The service would be available from $10 per month for each of the Documentary, Lifestyle, or Kids packages, and for $15 per month for either of the Drama or Entertainment packages. Sports and Movie packages would be available to subscribe as an addition to at least one starter package. As well as access to linear channels, the service would also make associated on-demand and catch up content available to subscribers.

Amidst rumours of an impending rename of the service, Foxtel announced in May 2017 that it would be removing 19 channels across its various Foxtel Play packages. A re-allocation of resources towards more on-demand content, based on a review of customer viewing habits was provided as the reason for the reduction in linear channels; however, pricing for the service's entry level packages was to remain unchanged. On 6 June 2017, Foxtel announced a company wide rebrand, which was to include the renaming of Foxtel Play to Foxtel Now from 7 June 2017. Other changes included the addition of high-definition (HD) availability and Chromecast support on the service.

Foxtel Now was not the same product as Foxtel Play. Foxtel Play, irrespective of device, supported playback only in Standard Definition (SD). The re-branded Foxtel Now product supports playback in both SD and HD, however has not been rolled out on all Foxtel Play compatible devices yet. Foxtel announced their intention to roll out the Foxtel Now product to other devices throughout the second half of 2017, but only the PlayStation 4, Telstra TV and Sony TVs have had Foxtel Play apps upgraded to Foxtel Now.

On 9 November 2017, Foxtel unveiled the Foxtel Now Box. A custom-made Technicolor Skipper running Android TV, the box is the flagship device for the Foxtel Now product. The launch included a small controversy, as Foxtel had previously promised the box would ship with the Netflix app available. The Netflix logo was included on some promotional material, which was deleted. During the launch event, Foxtel hinted that it was Netflix who was slowing the process, not yet having certified the box. However, as of November 2019, the Netflix app has been made available through the Foxtel Now box, and all newer models of the box are now sold with the app pre-installed.

On 16 September 2019, Foxtel announced that their mobile application will close on 17 September, and most of its mobile subscribers will be integrated into Foxtel Go mobile app. the Set-top Box brand Foxtel Now Box, its app on Video Game consoles, and its website was not affected by their changes.

== Streaming channels ==
The following is a list of the subscription packages on offer and the respective channels included:

Pop & Lifestyle (starter packs)
- Fox Funny
- FOX8
- Fox Showcase
- Fox Comedy
- Fox Arena
- LifeStyle
- Lifestyle Home
- Lifestyle Food
Drama
- Fox Crime
- Fox One
- Fox Sleuth
- UKTV
- Universal TV
Sport
- ESPN
- ESPN2
- Fox Cricket 501
- Fox League 502
- Fox Sports 503
- Fox Footy 504 (not available on PC/Mac)
- Fox Sports 505
- Fox Sports 506
- Fox Sports More 507
Movies
- Foxtel Movies Action
- Foxtel Movies Comedy
- Foxtel Movies Kids
- Foxtel Movies Family
- Foxtel Movies Greats
- Foxtel Movies Hits
- Foxtel Movies Premiere
- Foxtel Movies Romance
- Foxtel Movies Thriller
- Lifetime Movie Network

Additional channels included in every package

- Animal Planet
- Bloomberg Television
- CNBC
- CNN
- Discovery
- Discovery Turbo
- Fox News Channel
- Fox Sports News 500
- Foxtel Arts
- ID
- NHK World-Japan
- Real Crime
- Real History
- News24
- News24 Weather
- News24 World
- Sky News UK
- TLC
- TVSN

== Compatible devices ==
The following is a list of Foxtel Now (4K and HD) compatible devices.

- Chromecast
- Telstra TV
- PlayStation 4 and PlayStation 5
- Apple TV (via AirPlay)
- Sony Android TVs
- PC and Mac (browser streaming requires Google Chrome)

The following is a list of Foxtel Now (SD) compatible devices.

- LG Smart TV's (selected 2013 models)
- PlayStation 3 (since 1 April 2014)
- Samsung Smart TV's (2012–2015 models, Any Smart Hub enabled 2012–2013 model Blu-Ray Players and Home Theatre Systems)
- Sony (2014 model Smart TVs)

Foxtel Now for Xbox 360 was discontinued on 1 July 2016.

Foxtel Now mobile application for Android Mobiles and Tablets which is supported until Android 10 and Apple iPhones and iPads until iOS 13 was discontinued on 17 September 2019.

== See also ==
- Foxtel Go
- DirecTV Stream
- Internet television in Australia
- Subscription television in Australia
- Mac
