= Presto (streaming company) =

Defunct Australian streaming service

- Website type: Private
- Available in: English
- Founded: 13 March 2014; 12 years ago
- Dissolved: 31 January 2017; 9 years ago
- Successor: Foxtel Now
- Headquarters: Sydney, New South Wales, Australia
- Area served: Australia
- Owner: Foxtel
- Services: Streaming service
- Registration: Monthly subscription required to access content
- Launched: 15 January 2015; 11 years ago
- Current status: Defunct

Presto was an Australian media streaming company which offered subscriptions to unlimited viewing of selected films, and from 2015, TV series. The service, initially owned wholly by Foxtel, launched on 13 March 2014 featuring films exclusively.

There were three separate subscription options for Presto, named Presto Movies, Presto TV, and the bundled option Presto Entertainment. It competed primarily against Australian streaming company Quickflix, the American-based Netflix and the Fairfax Media and Nine Entertainment Co. joint venture Stan.

In October 2016, Presto announced that it had been acquired by pay television company Foxtel, and that the service would soon shut down. It was subsequently shut down on January 31, 2017.

== History ==
=== Presto Movies ===
The service initially launched contract-free on 13 March 2014 at AU$19.99, but the price was lowered to AU$9.99 in August 2014. Films tend to be mostly recent releases, and come from Foxtel's suite of Foxtel Movies channels, who have relationships with studios including MGM, NBCUniversal, Paramount Pictures, Roadshow Films, Sony Pictures Entertainment, Twentieth Century Fox, The Walt Disney Company, Warner Bros Entertainment, Entertainment One (which formerly owned Hopscotch, but Hopscotch ceased operations by 2015, yet it still owns the rights to its catalog), Icon, Studiocanal and Transmission Films.

=== Presto TV and Presto Entertainment ===
On 8 December 2014, Foxtel and Seven West Media announced a spin-off of Presto Movies to launch before March 2015, to be named Presto Entertainment, which would feature television programs, with content coming from both Foxtel channels and the Seven Network. The existing Presto Movies service would continue to be available, but each would require a separate subscription. It became available on 15 January 2015, and was named Presto TV, with Presto Entertainment referring to the bundled offer for both movies and TV access at $14.99.

Australian content made available from Foxtel includes Wentworth, Satisfaction, Love My Way, Spirited, and Tangle. Local Seven Network content includes Packed to the Rafters, All Saints, City Homicide, Home and Away, Winners & Losers and Always Greener. Foreign content includes Mr Selfridge, Lewis, A Touch of Frost and Rosemary and Thyme. Aquarius was to join Presto after it premiered on the Seven Network.

Presto also had exclusive access to HBO programming including Entourage, The Sopranos and Boardwalk Empire, with the notable exception of Game of Thrones. A non-exclusive deal was also reached with Showtime, which includes programs such as Ray Donovan, Dexter, and Californication, but these programs were also featured on rival service Stan.

Presto also commissioned its own local content in the form of short-form streaming series Let's Talk About, written, directed and starring Matilda Brown and Richard Davies.

From May 2015, Presto started offering Australian premiere content, including Mr. Robot, Bitten, The Firm, Matador and Rogue.

=== Closure ===
In October 2016, the company announced that Seven West Media's 50% stake in Presto would be bought out by Foxtel, and Presto would cease operations on 31 January 2017. Existing Presto subscribers were given automatic access to Foxtel's own streaming service, Foxtel Now.

== Marketing and subscription numbers ==
Original Presto logo (2014–2016)

Presto Entertainment cost $14.99 per month, which analysts noted was more expensive than rivals Netflix and Stan, which do not differentiate between film and television programming on their service.

Roughly 5 months after launch, it was suggested Presto Movies was struggling, with only "a few thousand subscribers". In May 2015, Roy Morgan Research found that Netflix had 1.039 million Australian users, compared to 97,000 for Presto and 91,000 for Stan. In October 2015, Nine Entertainment said that Stan had 150,000–200,000 paying subscribers, which they said was ahead of Presto's estimated 100,000 customers. It was later reported that Presto had approximately 130,000 paying subscribers as of September 2016, the month before the company announced it would cease operations the following January.

In May 2016, Presto had a public campaign in Melbourne involving a graffiti artist to promote the addition of Empire to the service.

== See also ==
- Internet television in Australia
- Subscription television in Australia
