= Nic Westaway =

Australian actor and singer (born 1989)

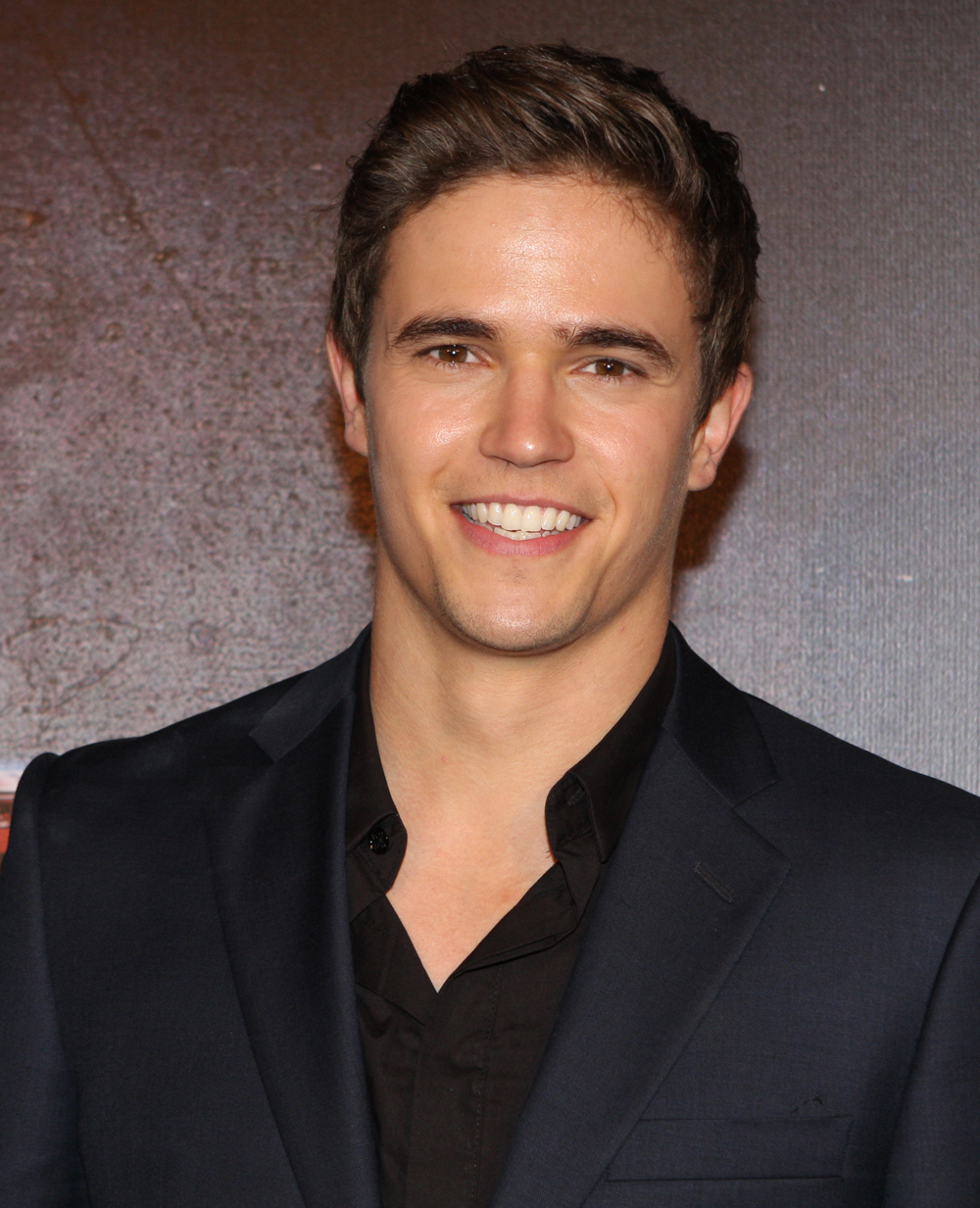
- Nic Westaway at the Man Of Steel premiere in Sydney
- Born: Nicholas Westaway; 20 January 1989 (age 37); Margaret River, Western Australia
- Occupation: Actor
- Years active: 2009–present
- Notable work: Home and Away (2012–2016)

Nicholas Westaway (born 20 January 1989) is an Australian actor and singer. From 2012 until 2016, he starred as Kyle Braxton in the soap opera Home and Away. He also plays in several drama shorts.

== Early life ==
Westaway was raised in Margaret River. He has two brothers. Westaway attended Margaret River Senior High School, the Outloud Dance Academy and performed with the Margaret River Theatre Group. He also played football for the Margaret River Hawks. Westaway deferred a sports science degree at the University of Western Australia, and later moved to Perth to attend the Western Australian Academy of Performing Arts (WAAPA).

== Career ==
Westaway has appeared in three short films: Running: A Western Australia Short, Happy Haven and Bonsai. In 2012, Westaway relocated to Sydney after successfully auditioning for the role of Kyle Braxton in Home and Away. He also appeared in the feature length spin-off Home and Away: An Eye for an Eye in 2015. Westaway decided to leave the show after almost four years, and he made his final appearance on 21 April 2016. He later reprised the role for two further specials: Home and Away: Revenge and Home and Away: All or Nothing.

Westaway stars as Samantha Jade's love interest in the music video for her single "Always". He also appears as American musician Xavier in Dance Academy: The Movie, and has filmed an appearance in television series We Were Tomorrow.

Westaway started his theatre career when taking up the main role of Prince Aladdin in the 2019 Christmas pantomime 'Aladdin' by Enchanted Entertainment at the Tyne Theatre & Opera House in Newcastle Upon Tyne, UK.

== Filmography ==
Year	Title	Role	Notes
2009	Running: A Western Australian Short	Cop Two	Short
2010	Happy Haven	Pete	Short
2011	Bonsai	Dave	Short
2012–2016	Home and Away	Kyle Braxton	Seasons 25–29 (main role, 379 episodes)
2015	Home and Away: An Eye for an Eye	Kyle Braxton	Streaming special
2016	Home and Away: Revenge	Kyle Braxton	Streaming special
2016	"Always"	Love interest	Music video
2017	Home and Away: All or Nothing	Kyle Braxton	Streaming special
2017	Dance Academy: The Movie	Xavier	
2017	Neurogenesis	Valentine	
2017–2018	Nameless: Blood and Chains	Pale	Season 2 (6 episodes)
2018	Nekrotronic	Young Henry	
2021	Stuck Home Syndrome	Simon	TV movie
2024	Legend of the Lost Locket	James Jacobs	
TBA	Three Chances I’m gone forever	Landon	Drama short (full movie)
