= Rick Donald =

Australian actor, writer and director

- Born: Townsville, Queensland, Australia
- Occupations: Actor; writer; director
- Years active: 2007–present
- Known for: 800 Words; Wentworth; Halifax Retribution
- Spouse: Catherine Mack-Hancock (m. 2016)
- Children: 1

Rick Donald is an Australian actor, writer and director. He attended the National Institute of Dramatic Art (NIDA) and made his first television appearance in Sea Patrol. This was followed by recurring or guest roles in Paper Giants: The Birth of Cleo, Crownies, Home and Away and Underbelly: Razor. Donald played Constable Daniel Parks in The Doctor Blake Mysteries and Mr. Tuck in House Husbands, before relocating to the United States where he starred in the 2014 sitcom Friends with Better Lives.

When Friends with Better Lives was cancelled after one season, Donald returned to Australia where he joined the casts of A Place to Call Home as Lloyd Ellis-Parker and 800 Words as Jeff "Woody" Woodson, which earned him a Logie Award nomination. In 2019, Donald played prison officer Sean Brody in Wentworth and appeared in the New Zealand comedy series Educators. From 2020, Donald had a recurring role in Home and Away as Kieran Baldivis.

Donald is also a writer and director. He wrote and directed short film The ATM, which was entered into the 2016 Tropfest, where it placed third in the competition. Donald won the Best Male Actor award for his performance in the film. He also wrote songs for his Friends With Better Lives character. In 2021, Donald's comedy series Australia's Sexiest Tradie, which he created, wrote and directed, began airing on 7mate.

== Early and personal life ==
Donald was born in Townsville and he grew up in the suburb of Cranbrook. He is one of four children. His father was a newspaper editor and his mother a ballroom dancer. Donald said his mother named him Rick after an actor on a television show. Donald attended Kirwan State High School, where his mother encouraged him to take drama classes. He later studied performance at James Cook University, and attended the National Institute of Dramatic Art (NIDA) for three years.

Donald has been married to fellow actor Catherine Mack-Hancock since 2016. A photograph of them embracing in their wedding attire in Yosemite National Park as the sun went down went viral shortly after. The couple have a daughter.

== Career ==
Donald's first television acting role was a guest appearance in a 2007 episode of Sea Patrol, opposite lead actress Lisa McCune. He told Sarah Nealon of The TV Guide that he did not sleep the night before filming and spent the day worrying about the camera and whether he was speaking too loud for the microphone. In February 2010, Donald starred in a 30-second advertisement for Libra menstrual pads that went viral. Fans of the ad created Facebook pages about Donald's character and made parody videos on YouTube. The following year, Donald appeared in the television miniseries Paper Giants: The Birth of Cleo, legal drama Crownies, and true-crime television film Blood Brothers, based on the Gilham family murders. He also had guest roles in soap opera Home and Away as "bad boy" Dean O'Mara, and Underbelly: Razor as Barney Dalton.

Donald appeared alongside David Wenham and Louise Lombard in the UKTV telemovie Dripping in Chocolate in April 2012. The following year, Donald joined the second season of House Husbands as school teacher Mr. Tuck. He also played Constable Daniel Parks in the first season of The Doctor Blake Mysteries. Donald admitted that he was "devastated" about leaving Doctor Blake to move to the United States, as it marked his first major lead role. While filming House Husbands, Donald filmed an audition for American sitcom Friends With Better Lives on his mobile phone. He secured the part of Lowell, an Australian hippy and fiancé of Brooklyn Decker's character Jules. Donald also contributed to the show by writing Lowell's songs. Friends With Better Lives was cancelled after one season. Donald said that while he was disappointed not to be able to hang out with the cast anymore, he had been missing Australia and was happy to return.

Donald began appearing in A Place to Call Home as artist Lloyd Ellis-Parker from the third season, broadcast in 2015. He returned for the fourth season the following year. From 2015 to 2018, Donald played carpenter "Woody" in television drama 800 Words, which was filmed in New Zealand. Donald had not been to the country before he was cast. Donald's character proved popular with viewers during season one and his role was expanded in season two, with Woody receiving a love interest and his own storylines. For his work on 800 Words, Donald received a nomination for Most Outstanding Supporting Actor at the 2017 Logie Awards. Donald's short film The ATM took the third place prize at the 2016 Tropfest. He also won the Best Male Actor accolade for his role in the film. Donald appeared in the ABC comedy series Back In Very Small Business in 2018.

In 2019, Donald was cast in Wentworth as prison officer Sean Brody. He was offered the role by series producer Pino Amenta, who he worked with on 800 Words. Donald called it "the best role I’ve been able to play yet", as Sean is a more serious character, which meant Donald was able to stretch his acting skills. That same year, his co-star on 800 Words, Jesse Griffin asked him to join the cast of New Zealand comedy series Educators, which is set in a secondary school. Donald plays angry PE teacher Vinnie Thompson and found the role to be "cathartic", as he would never act like Vinnie does in real life. Donald appeared as a police officer in Halifax: Retribution, a 2020 sequel to the 1990s Halifax f.p. crime series starring Rebecca Gibney.

Donald also re-joined the recurring cast of Home and Away as Kieran Baldivis in late 2020. Kieran is Martha Stewart's (Belinda Giblin) estranged and "deeply troubled" son. Donald said he was "instantly keen" when producers told him about the character's story, which includes mental health and addiction issues. Donald was also excited to join the show's Stewart family and work with Ray Meagher and Georgie Parker. As he lives in Palm Beach, where the show is filmed, Donald liked that he was able to walk to work, especially during the COVID-19 pandemic. In addition to his role on Home and Away, Donald also appears in the 7mate comedy series Australia's Sexiest Tradie, which he created, wrote and directed. Donald stars as Frankie, a plumber who enters a radio contest to find Australia's sexiest tradie in a bid to impress his father.

In 2024, Donald appeared in 7plus streaming series Roast Night which he also wrote and directed. He was also cast in the Stan drama Population 11, and feature film Kangaroo. On 19 August 2024, Donald was named as part of the extended cast for the Australian adaptation of The Office.

On 19 June 2025, it was confirmed that Donald would appear in the third and final season of the UK / Irish dramedy The Dry as Daryl. In December 2025, Donald appeared in Stan Australia series Sunny Nights.

On 11 March 2026, Donald was named in the cast for upcoming series Swimmers, created and directed by his wife Catherine Mack. On 4 September 2026, during the Foxtel / Binge Upfronts, a new comedy series called Tough Love was announced, which Donald created and wrote. He also stars in the series as Shane, alongside Miranda Otto, Liz Kingsman, Hugo Johnstone-Burt, and Jay Ryan.

== Filmography ==
=== Film ===
Year	Title	Role	Notes
2009	Legend	Cliffy	Short film
2010	Before the Rain	Cliff Reed	
2011	Commercialisms	Actor	Short film
2013	Mates	Jimmy	Short film; also writer
2016	The ATM	Frankie	Short film; also director, writer and producer
2025	Kangaroo	Trap	

=== Television ===
Year	Title	Role	Notes
2007	Sea Patrol	Glen "Hawkie" Hawkes	Episode: "What Lies Beneath"
2011	Paper Giants: The Birth of Cleo	Murray	Miniseries
2011	Blood Brothers	Chris Gilham	Television film
2011	Home and Away	Dean O'Mara	Recurring
2011	Underbelly: Razor	Barney Dalton	
2011	Crownies	Scott Summers	
2012	The Woodlies	Firehead	Voice
2012	Dripping in Chocolate	Carl Dukes	
2012	Tricky Business	Drew Bullard	Episode: "Opportunity Knocks"
2013	The Doctor Blake Mysteries	Constable Daniel Parks	
2013	House Husbands	Mr. Tuck	
2014	Friends with Better Lives	Lowell Peddit	
2015–2016	A Place to Call Home	Lloyd Ellis-Parker	Recurring
2015–2018	800 Words	Jeff "Woody" Woodson	Main cast
2017	The Doctor Blake Mysteries: Family Portrait	Danny Parks	Telemovie
2018	Back In Very Small Business	Cody Branson	
2019	Wentworth	Sean Brody	Recurring; Season 7
2019–2022	Educators	Vinnie Thompson	Main cast
2020	Halifax: Retribution	Nick Tanner	Main cast
2020–2021	Home and Away	Kieran Baldivis	Recurring: Seasons 33–34
2021	Australia's Sexiest Tradie	Frankie Wood	Also creator, writer and director
2022	My Life Is Murder	Zachary	Guest
2024	Roast Night	Glen Turner	Also writer and director
2024	Population 11	Leon Croydman	Main cast
2024	The Office	Danny	Guest
2025	Sunny Nights	Nugget	Episode: "1.2"
2026	The Dry	Daryl	
TBA	Tough Love	Shane Hart	TV series: Also writer / creator
TBA	Swimmers	TBA	TV series
