= Annabelle Stephenson =

Australian actress

- Born: 12 April 1988 (age 38); London, England
- Occupation: Actress
- Years active: 2006–present

Annabelle Stephenson (born 12 April 1988) is an English-born Australian actress. She began her career playing Miriam Kent in H_{2}O: Just Add Water. After graduating from the National Institute of Dramatic Art, Stephenson moved to Los Angeles, where she filmed a pilot for MTV. She gained wider recognition as Sara Munello in Revenge (2013–2014) and Laura Maney in the Netflix series Tidelands. Stephenson's film roles include Rehearsal (2015), Escape Room (2017), and Pray for Rain (2017). Stephenson joined the cast of television soap opera Home and Away as Taylor Rosetta in 2020.

== Early life ==
Stephenson was born in London, England. She moved to Australia with her parents and brother when she was a young child, and grew up in the Queensland suburbs of Mudgeeraba and Burleigh. Stephenson took an interest in the performing arts from a young age, recalling "I have always been drawn to the creative arts. When I was little, I loved getting involved in school plays, dancing, painting and music." At 15, Stephenson realised she wanted to pursue acting. After securing an agent, she appeared in an advertisement for The Courier-Mail.

== Career ==
Stephenson's breakthrough role came in 2005 when she was cast as Miriam Kent in children's drama H_{2}O: Just Add Water. The series was filmed at Somerset College, where Stephenson was in Year 12 at the time. She then had a recurring role in drama series Rescue: Special Ops. Stephenson went on to study at the National Institute of Dramatic Art (NIDA) and moved to Los Angeles after graduating. In November 2012, Stephenson was cast as the lead in Hot Mess, a pilot created by Lauren Iungerich for MTV. Iungerich later left the project and Stephenson was released by the network. A week later it was confirmed that MTV had decided not to pick the series up.

Stephenson appeared in the television drama Revenge from 2013 to 2014 as Sara Munello, the former girlfriend of main character Daniel Grayson (Josh Bowman). Stephenson recalled that she and Bowman had good chemistry during her audition, which she put down to them both being British and learning that their aunts are best friends. Stephenson went on to appear in films Point of Honor (2015), Rehearsal (2015), and Escape Room (2017). After filming Pray for Rain alongside Jane Seymour in 2017, Stephenson returned to Australia, where she was cast as widow Laura Maney in Tidelands, the first original Australian drama series for Netflix. Stephenson believed the role was "meant to be" as the casting director Tom McSweeney originally cast her in H_{2}O: Just Add Water.

Stephenson joined the cast of television soap opera Home and Away in August 2020. Stephenson plays Taylor Rosetta, the wife of returning character Angelo Rosetta (played by Luke Jacobz). The actress read for the part shortly after returning to Australia from Italy. She relocated to Sydney for filming the same week she was cast. Stephenson was reunited with her childhood friend Tim Franklin, who plays Taylor's love interest Colby Thorne. The pair had not worked together before, and Stephenson told Kerry Harvey of Stuff.co.nz that they had often joked about how funny it would be if they became romantically involved on-screen. The following year, Stephenson appeared in the comedy television series Australia's Sexiest Tradie. Stephenson appears in the 2022 Australian comedy television show Rock Island Mysteries.

== Filmography ==
Year	Title	Role	Notes
2006	Mortified	Saint Joan	Episode: "Being Me"; as Annabelle Stevenson
2006	H_{2}O: Just Add Water	Miriam Kent	Recurring role
2011	Rescue: Special Ops	Freya Morley	Recurring role; as Annabelle Stevenson
2013	Reef Doctors	Sarah	Episode: "1.2"
2013	Hot Mess	Amanda	Television film
2013–2014	Revenge	Sara Munello	Recurring role
2015	Point of Honor	Kate Rhodes	Television film
2015	Rehearsal	Celia	Feature film
2017	Escape Room	Natasha	Feature film; also associate producer
2017	Pray for Rain	Emma Gardner	Feature film
2018	Tidelands	Laura Maney	Recurring role
2020	The End	Janice Hopper	Recurring role
2020	Home and Away	Taylor Rosetta	Recurring role
2021	Australia's Sexiest Tradie	Summer	
2022	Rock Island Mysteries	Racquel Newman	
2024	Life After Fighting	Julie Creylan	
