= Hugo Johnstone-Burt =

Australian actor (born 1988)

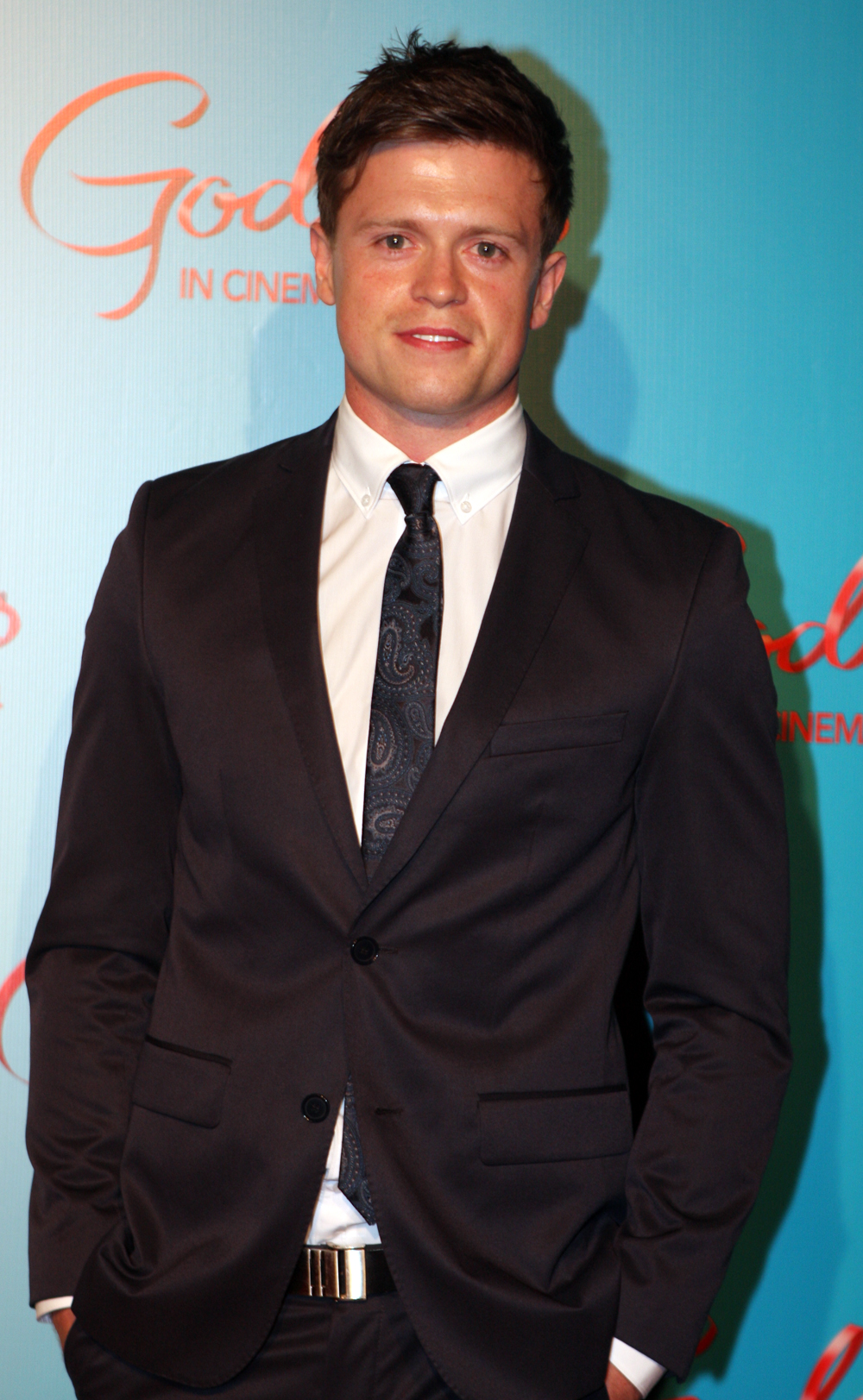
- Johnstone-Burt at the premiere of Goddess in 2013
- Born: Hugo Kingsley Johnstone-Burt; 10 October 1988 (age 38); Edinburgh, Scotland
- Occupation: Actor
- Years active: 2009–present
- Spouse: Julie Snook (m. 2021)
- Children: 1

Hugo Kingsley Johnstone-Burt (born 10 October 1988) is a Scottish-Australian actor. He grew up in Sydney and decided to become an actor after attending his first drama class. Johnstone-Burt graduated from the National Institute of Dramatic Art in 2009. He appeared in small roles in Australian dramas Rake, Sea Patrol and Underbelly: The Golden Mile, before he was cast as Fish Lamb in Cloudstreet. The role earned him two ASTRA Award nominations. Johnstone-Burt went on to star in Carelesss Love and he took on the role of Constable Hugh Collins in ABC1's Miss Fisher's Murder Mysteries. In 2012, Johnstone-Burt appeared in Tricky Business and filmed a guest role in Home and Away. He has also appeared in the musical drama film Goddess (2013) and the disaster film San Andreas (2015).

== Early life ==
Johnstone-Burt was born in Edinburgh, Scotland. He moved to Australia with his family when he was two years old, and grew up in Sydney. His parents were both in the navy. His brother is in the army, while his sister is a lawyer. Johnstone-Burt told TV Week's Erin Miller that he chose a career in acting because he was not good at anything in high school, saying "I was a bit of a clown and liked to muck around and make people laugh, and then I went to my first drama class and thought, 'Well, amazing, I can do this for the rest of my life.'" His parents supported his career choice and after leaving Barker College, Johnstone-Burt auditioned for the National Institute of Dramatic Art (NIDA) aged 18. However, he was told he was too young to attend and he decided to go travelling instead. When he returned to Australia, Johnstone-Burt auditioned for NIDA again and was accepted. For his graduation play in 2009, he took on the role of Jack in The Importance of Being Earnest.

== Career ==
Johnstone-Burt had small roles in episodes of Rake and Sea Patrol and starred in the film Before the Rain. He also appeared as "a young thug" in Underbelly: The Golden Mile. The actor stated that the role allowed him to play tougher than he is in real life and commented that it "gives you a bit of a rush." Johnstone-Burt garnered a nomination for an Out of the Box award from the Inside Film Awards.

A week before he graduated from NIDA, Johnstone-Burt was approached to play the brain damaged Fish Lamb in the television adaptation of Tim Winton's Cloudstreet. After attending the audition, the actor believed he had done a good enough job to secure the role. He told a The Daily Telegraph reporter, "I supposed I walked out thinking I did a good job – seeing how I worked with [director Matthew Saville] and taking his direction. Then I had to sit by my phone for a month and hopefully get a call." To prepare for the role, Johnstone-Burt visited a home for people with intellectual disabilities and he then spent four months shooting the miniseries in Western Australia.

For his performance in Cloudstreet, the actor earned nominations for Best New Talent and Most Outstanding Performance by an Actor at the 2012 ASTRA Awards. A reporter for the Herald Sun also included Johnstone-Burt in their "11 Faces To Watch in 2011" list. The actor next appeared as Seb in John Duigan's film Careless Love. He also travelled to Hollywood for the pilot season, where he auditioned for upcoming television shows and films. Johnstone-Burt was then cast as Constable Hugh Collins in ABC TV's Miss Fisher's Murder Mysteries, a drama series based on Kerry Greenwood's Phryne Fisher historical mysteries. Miss Fisher's Murder Mysteries was renewed for a second series in which he reprised his role.

In March 2012, Johnstone-Burt joined the cast of drama series Tricky Business. The following month, Johnstone-Burt revealed that he had filmed a guest role for the soap opera Home and Away. The actor called his character, Jamie Sharpe, "a super-creepy stalker guy" and said he had worked a lot with Ada Nicodemou (Leah Patterson-Baker). He also appeared alongside Magda Szubanski in the musical drama film Goddess.

In 2015, Johnstone-Burt continued to appear in his role of Hugh in the third season of Miss Fisher's Murder Mysteries. He also had a leading role in the feature film San Andreas, alongside Dwayne Johnson. Johnstone-Burt appeared in the Network Ten drama The Wrong Girl as Vincent, the brother of lead character Lily played by Jessica Marais. He reprised his role of Hugh Collins in the 2020 feature film Miss Fisher and the Crypt of Tears. It was shot on-location in Melbourne and Morocco in 2018. The following year, he appeared in Rick Donald's comedy series Australia's Sexiest Tradie. In 2023, Johnstone-Burt played Henry Broad in the British drama series Ten Pound Poms. He also appeared in the British sitcom Queen of Oz.

In 2024, Johnstone-Burt appeared in the 7plus series Roast Night. He also guest-starred in an episode of the crime comedy drama series Return to Paradise. In September 2026, he was confirmed as part of the cast of upcoming comedy series Tough Love.

== Personal life ==
Johnstone-Burt has been in a relationship with news reporter Julie Snook since 2016. The couple announced their engagement in November 2019, and they married in the Blue Mountains in March 2021, having postponed the ceremony twice due to the COVID-19 pandemic. Johnstone-Burt and Snook welcomed their first child, a son, in December 2022.

== Filmography ==
Year	Title	Role	Notes
2009	Nicky Two-Tone	Nicky	
2010	Feeling Lucky	Ted	
2010	Before the Rain	Nicky TwoTone	
2010	Underbelly: The Golden Mile	Adam Andrews	
2010	Search	Dave	Short film
2010	Rake	Travis Tanner	Episode: "R vs Tanner"
2011	Sea Patrol	Corey McGinley	Episode: "Eye for an Eye"
2011	Cloudstreet	Fish Lamb	
2012	Careless Love	Seb	
2012	Tricky Business	Alex Rudan	
2012–13	Home and Away	Jamie Sharpe	Recurring role
2012–15	Miss Fisher's Murder Mysteries	Hugh Collins	Main cast
2013	Goddess	Ralph	Feature film
2013	Dance Academy	Nick	Episode: "Second Chances"
2015	San Andreas	Ben Taylor	Feature film
2016–17	The Wrong Girl	Vincent Woodward	Main cast
2019	Mr Inbetween	Jason	Episode S2
2020	Miss Fisher and the Crypt of Tears	Hugh Collins	Feature film
2021	Australia's Sexiest Tradie	Steve	
2023	Ten Pound Poms	Henry Broad	
2023	Queen of Oz	Augustus Reed	Episodes: "Ginger Eyebrows" and "Royal Tinder"
2024	Roast Night	Tommy Turner	Main cast
2024	Return to Paradise	Henry Jones	Episode: "Killer Climate"
2025	NCIS: Sydney	Sgt. Henry Ascott	Episode: "Lost in Translation"
