= Goddess (2013 film) =

Australian romantic comedy musical film

- Theatrical film poster
- Directed by: Mark Lamprell
- Written by: Mark Lamprell; Joanna Weinberg
- Produced by: Richard Keddie; Andrena Finlay
- Starring: Laura Michelle Kelly; Ronan Keating; Magda Szubanski; Dustin Clare; Hugo Johnstone-Burt; Natalie Tran; Pia Miranda; Corinne Grant; Tamsin Carroll; Celia Ireland
- Cinematography: Damian Wyvill
- Edited by: Mark Warner
- Music by: Bryony Marks; Joanna Weinberg
- Production companies: The Film Company; Ealing Metro International; Wildheart Films
- Distributed by: Roadshow Films
- Release date: 14 March 2013 (Australia)
- Running time: 104 minutes
- Country: Australia
- Language: English
- Box office: $1,655,620

Goddess is a 2013 Australian romantic comedy musical film, directed by Mark Lamprell. The film stars singer Ronan Keating, Laura Michelle Kelly and Magda Szubanski.

== Plot ==
Elspeth Dickens (Laura Michelle Kelly) dreams of finding her "voice" despite being stuck in an isolated farmhouse with her twin boys (Phoenix and Levi Morrison). A webcam she installs in her kitchen becomes her pathway to fame and fortune. Through singing her funny sink-songs into the webcam, Elspeth becomes a cyber-sensation.

While her husband James (Ronan Keating) is off saving the world's whales, Elspeth is offered the chance of a lifetime. But when forced to choose between fame and family, the newly anointed internet goddess almost loses it all.

== Cast ==
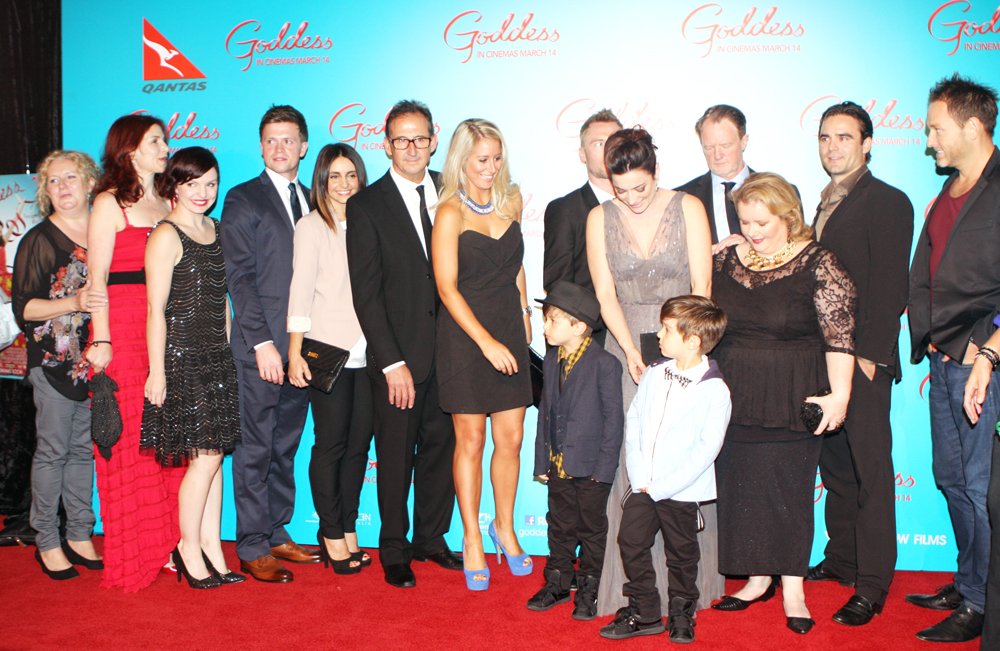
Group photograph of the cast

- Ronan Keating as James Dickens
- Laura Michelle Kelly as Elspeth Dickens
- Magda Szubanski as Cassandra Wolfe
- Phoenix Morrison as Fred (twin)
- Levi Morrison as Zac (twin)
- Dustin Clare as Rory
- Hugo Johnstone-Burt as Ralph
- Corinne Grant as Fizz
- Pia Miranda as Sophie
- Natalie Tran as Helen
- Lucy Durack as Cherry
- Celia Ireland as Mary
- Cameron Lyon as Neil
- Paul Livingston as Waiter
- Viviana Delgado as Peruvian Woman
- Tamsin Carroll as Deb

== Production ==
Goddess was filmed, in part, in Sydney, Australia and Stanley, Tasmania. The film is based on the original stage play Sinksongs, written and performed by Joanna Weinberg with music for the film written by Joanna Weinberg, Bryony Marks and Judy Morris.

== Film festivals ==
In early June 2014, Goddess opened the Maui International Film Festival to great reviews.

== Box office ==
In its opening weekend, Goddess grossed $512,445 in Australia. The film was shown on 207 screens, which gave it a per-screen average of $2,476.

== Accolades ==
Award	Category	Subject	Result
AACTA Awards (3rd)	Best Cinematography	Damian Wyvill	Nominated
AACTA Awards (3rd)	Best Production Design	Annie Beauchamp	Nominated
AACTA Awards (3rd)	Best Costume Design	Shareen Beringer	Nominated
ACS Award	NSW & ACT Silver Award	Damian Wyvill	Won
ASE Award	Best Editing in a Feature Film	Mark Warner	Nominated
ASSG Award	Best Achievement in Sound for Film Sound Mixing	Glenn Butler	Nominated
FCCA Awards	Best Actress	Laura Michelle Kelly	Nominated
FCCA Awards	Best Actress - Supporting Role	Magda Szubanski	Nominated
FCCA Awards	Best Music	Bryony Marks	Nominated
FCCA Awards	Best Music	Joanna Weinberg	Nominated
FCCA Awards	Best Production Design	Annie Beauchamp	Nominated
