= Catherine Mack-Hancock =

Australian actress and director (born 1983)

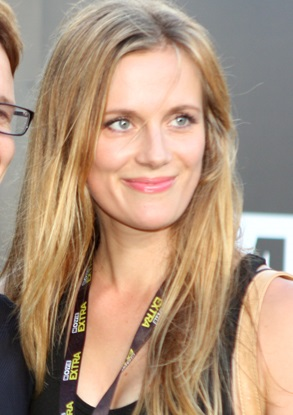
- Born: 1983 (age 42–43); Melbourne, Victoria, Australia
- Occupations: Actress, director
- Years active: 1999–present
- Spouse: Rick Donald (m. 2016)
- Children: 1

Catherine Mack-Hancock (born 1983) is an Australian actress and director.

== Early life and education ==
Mack-Hancock started acting an early age, performing locally with the Geelong Society of Dramatic Arts and landing a role in Channel 9's Kids Breakfast TV series. She was educated at Bellbrae Primary School, Grovedale College and the University of Melbourne, where she obtained a Bachelor of Arts degree in Criminology and Philosophy, and a Diploma of Creative Arts.

Mack-Hancock spent two years in New York City studying acting at the Atlantic Theater Company. She returned in 2011 on a scholarship to attend the graduate program, which was based in Los Angeles. The scholarship was awarded to only one international actor. Mack-Hancock also studied at the Ivana Chubbuck Studio in Los Angeles and New York.

== Career ==
Mack-Hancock is best known for her roles on Australian and international television shows such as Channel 9's Pig's Breakfast, Neighbours and Blue Heelers.

In 2011, it was reported that Mack-Hancock had filmed a guest role in the Seven Network drama series, Winners & Losers, which was done so shortly before she left to study at a Los Angeles acting school. She had a short film Passenger screen as a finalist at Tropfest in 2016.

Mack-Hancock has featured in international advertising campaigns for brands including L'Oreal and Nike and Escape Travel.

In 2012, it was announced that Mack-Hancock had joined the cast of Home and Away as Natalie Davison. She is credited as Catherine Mack on the show. The character was introduced as a love interest for Darryl Braxton (played by Steve Peacocke). In 2013, she was nominated for the Logie Award for Most Popular New Female Talent for her role, but left Home and Away that same year.

Mack appeared in Australia's Sexiest Tradie created by her husband Rick Donald in 2021.

== Personal life ==
Mack-Hancock married fellow actor Rick Donald in 2016. They have one child, a daughter.

Mack-Hancock revealed to that she had always been interested in health and nutrition.

== Filmography ==
=== Film ===
Year	Title	Role	Notes
2004	Tim's New Hope	Chloe	Short film
2004	Just Another Day in the Neighborhood		Video
2011	That Girl, That Time	Charlotte	Short film
2011	Jasper	Detective Tate	Feature film
2013	Inside NHP	Self	Short film
2013	Hill Top Off	Self	Short film
2016	The ATM	Kelly	Short film
2017	Passenger		Short film
2018	Love Lex	Alexis Spencer	Short film
2019	The Hunt	Jade	Short film
TBA	The Prelude: Lady Blue	Dawn	Short film (completed)
TBA	The Playlist	Jess	Short film (in production)

=== Television ===
Year	Title	Role	Notes
1999	Pig's Breakfast	Jessica	TV series, 25 episodes
2001	Neighbours	Amanda Wills	TV series
2006	Blue Heelers	Kelly	TV series
2011	Winners & Losers	Tasha Reynolds	TV series, season 1, episode 12: "Out of Left Field"
2012–2013	Home and Away	Natalie Davison	TV series, 100 episodes (main cast)
2015	Wonderland	Kelly	TV series, 2 episodes
2017	Shop Girls	Bianca	TV series
2017	Pulse	Alicia Knox	TV miniseries, season 1, episode 5
2021	Amazing Grace	Bonnie	TV series, 3 episodes
2021	Australia's Sexiest Tradie	Rachel	TV series, 6 episodes
2023	Watch Dogs	Laura	TV series, 8 episodes
