= List of Home and Away characters introduced in 2020 =

Home and Away is an Australian television soap opera. It was first broadcast on the Seven Network on 17 January 1988. The following is a list of characters that will appear in 2020, by order of first appearance. All characters are introduced by the soap's executive producer, Lucy Addario. The 33rd season of Home and Away began airing from 27 January 2020. Gemma Parata was introduced on the same day, followed by her son Nikau Parata. Tane Parata made his debut in February, while Marco Astoni arrived in March. Evan Slater made his first appearance in May, while Amber Simmons was introduced in July. Evan's brother Owen Davidson made his first appearance in August. September marked the arrivals of Taylor Rosetta and Christian Green. Kieran Baldivis and Lewis Hayes arrived in November.

== Gemma Parata ==
Gemma Parata
- Home and Away character
- Portrayed by: Bree Peters
- First appearance: 27 January 2020
- Last appearance: 8 July 2020
- Introduced by: Lucy Addario
In-universe information
- Occupation: Waitress; Bartender
- Husband: Mikaere Parata
- Sons: Nikau Parata

Gemma Parata, played by Bree Peters, made her first appearance on 27 January 2020. Peters' casting was confirmed in November 2019, and her character details were revealed in 25–31 January 2020 issue of TV Week. Peters said she had some initial nerves about joining the show, but had felt welcomed by the other cast members. She continued, "Being a new family on a show like Home and Away is great. New people to play and act with comes with a lot of excitement." Gemma is the mother of Nikau Parata (Kawakawa Fox-Reo) and the sister-in-law of Ari Parata (Rob Kipa-Williams) and Tane Parata (Ethan Browne). Peters took inspiration from her friends for Gemma's personality. She described her character as a matriarch, who is surrounded by boys, and said "She's the kind of mum on the sidelines of a rugby game, but also the one who will look after the girls." Peters also said that family means everything to Gemma, and an Inside Soap writer added that while "misfortune" has befallen the Paratas, Gemma dares to dream of a better life. The character made an unannounced departure on 8 July 2020, as she returned to New Zealand to scatter the ashes of her husband Mikaere. The serial's UK broadcaster Channel 5 later confirmed that the episode was Gemma's last, while Peters also confirmed the news on her social media and paid tribute to the producers for introducing Māori characters to the show. Stephanie McKenna of The West Australian thought the New Zealand trip would end badly, writing "it's the happiest Gem has been in a long time and she has a beaming grin. But of course, it wouldn't be Home and Away if nothing bad happened."

After learning that her brother-in-law Ari Parata has been involved in a hostage situation at the Northern Districts Hospital, Gemma makes her way there to see him. Ari later tells Gemma that Marilyn Chambers (Emily Symons) has invited them and Gemma's son Nikau to dinner. Nikau is rude to Marilyn when she defends Ari, and Gemma makes him apologise to Marilyn the following day. Nikau blames Ari for their situation, as the family are struggling financially and are living in a motel. Gemma believes that he will come around eventually. Gemma is offered a job at the Pier Diner and she and Ari decide to stay in the Bay. But Gemma has to take food from the Diner to feed Nikau and the family are forced out of the motel when they cannot pay the bill. They spend the night in their car, before Marilyn invites them to move in with her. Marilyn's husband John Palmer (Shane Withington) clashes with Ari, who moves into the Caravan Park. John finds out that Ari was in prison and Gemma's husband Mikaere was shot by police during a robbery. Gemma and Nikau's presence causes problems between John and Marilyn, and Nikau worries that the family will be run out of town due to Ari and John's feud. Gemma tries to reassure him, while also warning Ari that his new relationship with Mackenzie Booth (Emily Weir) is making him the subject of town gossip.

Gemma attempts to apologise to John, and they end up talking about their families and Gemma's late husband. They agree to a fresh start. Gemma supports Nikau when Bella Nixon (Courtney Miller) has a violent reaction to his romantic advances and self-harms. John also helps Nikau and he and Gemma bond over their sons. Ari's brother Tane turns up in the Bay and Gemma has to break up a fight between them. Tane later rents the family a house and Gemma secures a new job at Salt, after her shifts at the Diner are cut. The family invite their friends to a hāngī, and Gemma befriends Ben Astoni (Rohan Nichol). Ben's estranged wife Maggie Astoni (Kestie Morassi) later sees them flirting at Salt and confronts Ben. He and Gemma get drunk and go back to his motel room, where they share a kiss. But Gemma pulls away and tells Ben that she is not ready to move on from Mikaere. They fall asleep on the bed together. Nikau confronts his mother for spending the night with Ben and accuses her of disrespecting his father's memory. They later fight, but Nikau soon apologises. Ben and Gemma decide to remain friends after facing objections from their families. After the Diner is robbed, Colby Thorne (Tim Franklin) asks Gemma if he can take her fingerprints, but she refuses. The Paratas remain the prime suspects in the robbery and a later carjacking. Gemma decides that it is time to spread Mikaere's ashes in New Zealand, and Ari, Tane and Nikau agree to come with her. At the airport, Gemma makes it through passport control, but Ari, Tane and Nikau are stopped. Tane calls Gemma and encourages her to go to New Zealand, as they will catch up with her, and Gemma leaves alone. She decides to stay in New Zealand permanently and later asks Nikau to join her.

== Nikau Parata ==
Nikau Parata
- Home and Away character
- Portrayed by: Kawakawa Fox-Reo
- Duration: 2020–2023
- First appearance: 28 January 2020
- Last appearance: 2 March 2023
- Introduced by: Lucy Addario
In-universe information
- Occupation: Bait shop worker; Model; Surf board shop assistant; Lifeguard
- Father: Mikaere Parata
- Mother: Gemma Parata
- Uncles: Ari Parata; Tane Parata
- First cousins: Kiri

Nikau Parata, played by Kawakawa Fox-Reo, made his first appearance on 28 January 2020. Fox-Reo's casting was announced alongside that of Rob Kipa-Williams (Ari Parata) in a November 2019 issue of TV Soap. Further casting and character details were announced on 29 December 2019. Three months after securing a place at the American Academy of Dramatic Arts, Fox-Reo was offered the role of Nikau, and he chose to give up his place at the academy to accept it. He admitted that he has been suffering from home sickness since relocating to Sydney, where the show's studio is located. Fox-Reo, Kipa-Williams, and Ethan Browne (Tane Parata) form the serial's new Māori family. The actors worked with the show's writers to make sure the family were authentic. Fox-Reo explained, "My desire and my wish is that when people watch it back home, they see a world that's real familiar to them – how we treat each other as a family, our sense of humour. I've tried my best to integrate as much of my upbringing into this character and hopefully people back home like it."

Fox-Reo described Nikau as "impulsive at times", not shy with girls, and close to his mother Gemma (Bree Peters). He added "ultimately, as with any new environment, he's trying to find his place in Summer Bay." The character will initially interact with Jade Lennox (Mia Morrissey), who released a sex tape and made a false allegation against Ryder Jackson (Lukas Radovich). Nikau ends up punching Ryder after he tries to warn Nikau about Jade. Nikau became a love interest for Bella Nixon (Courtney Miller). Following a day getting to know each other, they share a kiss on the pier, but face disapproval from Dean Thompson (Patrick O'Connor).

On 30 November 2022, Georgie Kearney of 7Entertainment reported that Fox-Reo was set to leave the serial and that he had already filmed his final scenes. Kearney noted that fans had been speculating about his departure ever since he dyed his hair blond and left Australia the previous month. Nikau's final scenes aired on 2 March 2023, as he left the Bay with Bella for New York.

== Tane Parata ==
Tane Parata, played by Ethan Browne, made his first appearance on 10 February 2020. Browne's casting and character details were announced on 29 December 2019. Home and Away marks Browne's first television role. He admitted that his family are fans of Home and Away, saying "Grandma Minna is a massive fan and she couldn't believe I got the job." Browne's character Tane is the brother of Ari Parata (Rob Kipa-Williams), who was introduced at the end of 2019. They, along with Nikau Parata (Kawakawa Fox-Reo), form the serial's new Māori family. All three actors worked with the script writers to make sure the family were authentic. Holly Byrnes of The Daily Telegraph reported that Tane's character brief was "a saucy one, with notes like 'most likely to be drunk and disorderly' and 'most likely to bring home a different partner every week.'" Browne also described his character as "a mischief maker, the cheeky brother and quite free-spirited." He added that Tane loves and takes care of his family. The show's 8000th episode, broadcast on 27 March 2023, featured Tane marrying his love interest Felicity Newman (Jacqui Purvis). Following the departure of his on-screen family, producers introduced Tane's cousin Kahu Parata (Jordi Webber) in April 2023. In 2022, Browne earned a nomination for Best Daytime Star at the Inside Soap Awards.

== Marco Astoni ==
Marco Astoni
- Home and Away character
- Portrayed by: Tim Walter
- First appearance: 12 March 2020
- Last appearance: 5 May 2020
- Introduced by: Lucy Addario
In-universe information
- Occupation: Businessman
- Brothers: Ben Astoni
- Nieces: Ziggy Astoni

Marco Astoni, played by Tim Walter, made his first appearance on 12 March 2020. Walter previously appeared in the show in 2008 as Aaron Copeland. Marco is the brother of established character Ben Astoni (Rohan Nichol) and his introduction helps explore Ben's backstory further. Daniel Kilkelly of Digital Spy said Marco has been in love with Ben's wife Maggie Astoni (Kestie Morassi) since he was a teenager. After witnessing an argument between Marco and Maggie, Ben assaulted his brother, who then reported him to the police and left him estranged from the family. Producers described Marco as "confident" and "smooth-talking". He runs the family business, but as he "doesn't always make the best decisions", it has suffered and Marco now needs money. Kilkelly reported that Marco "arrives in the Bay under the guise of repairing his relationship with Ben and opening the door to family reconciliation through a joint business venture, but his arrival puts Maggie on edge." He added that Marco's introduction would "shake up the entire family."

Marco comes to Summer Bay to visit his estranged brother Ben Astoni on his birthday. Despite Ben's anger towards him, Marco assures Ben that he wants to reconcile, as he has missed him. Ben's daughter Ziggy Astoni (Sophie Dillman) convinces her father to let Marco stay, but her mother Maggie is uneasy and it emerges that she and Marco had a one-night stand 22 years ago, after she and Ben broke up after a fight. Ben and Marco reconcile their differences. They go out drinking and Marco tells Ben about an investment opportunity. Maggie is against the idea, but Marco threatens to tell Ben about the one-night stand, unless she convinces Ben to invest. Maggie tells Marco that she and Ben recently had financial difficulties and Ben had depression. Marco later helps Ziggy at Ben's surf board shop and learns Maggie is talking with Ben, who wants to discuss the proposal further. Once Ben agrees to invest, Maggie asks Marco to leave, but he refuses. On the day Ben and Marco are due to exchange contacts and money, Maggie tells Ben the truth about her one-night stand with Marco. Ziggy and Marco find Ben on the beach and he is tempted to hit his brother, but walks away instead.

Marco confronts Maggie and tells her that he just wanted to save the family business. He also says that no one has hurt Ben as much as she has. Marco admits to Ziggy that he always loved Maggie and hoped that it was all over between her and Ben, but they got back together, married and nine months later Ziggy was born. This leads Ziggy to question her paternity. Ben also realises that Maggie and Marco were arguing about their secret on the night he was arrested for assaulting Marco. Ben suggests that they take a paternity test, so Ziggy knows for sure who her father is. Marco returns on the day the results, which confirm Ben is Ziggy's father. Maggie says that she regrets their night together and for not telling Ben the truth sooner, which prompts Marco to admit that he loves her. Marco finds Ben at the Surf Club and tries to get him to have a drink with him, but Ben tells Marco that he has no brother and orders him to leave. Marco catches Ben at the beach the following morning and tries to reconcile, but Ben is adamant that they are done and tells him to go home. Maggie asks to meet Marco and threatens to tell his parents that he ran their business into the ground if he does not go. Before he leaves the Bay, Marco tells Ben that he wins, Maggie loves him and he should be a proper husband to her.

== Evan Slater ==
Evan Slater
- Home and Away character
- Portrayed by: Cameron Daddo
- First appearance: 14 May 2020
- Last appearance: 29 June 2020
- Introduced by: Lucy Addario
In-universe information
- Occupation: Musician
- Brothers: Owen Davidson
- Sons: Ryder Jackson

Evan Slater, played by Cameron Daddo, made his first appearance on 14 May 2020. Daddo's casting was announced in November 2019, while his character details were revealed shortly before his debut. Daddo was contracted for a two-month stint. Of his casting, he said "Summer Bay is everything and more, it's a delightful place to be. I didn't think I would be adding an early evening serial to my resume at this stage in life. As an actor, you don't know what you're doing month to month so I'm really grateful, especially being an artist because a lot of my contemporaries are doing it tough."

Evan is the long lost father of established regular Ryder Jackson (Lukas Radovich) and a potential love interest for his aunt Roo Stewart (Georgie Parker). Ryder is "naturally confused, puzzled and suspicious of the stranger", while his grandfather Alf Stewart (Ray Meagher) is wary of Evan's arrival. A TV Soap columnist wrote that when Ryder's mother Quinn Jackson (Lara Cox) made an appearance three years ago, she said she had a brief relationship with Ryder's father when they worked as musicians on a cruise ship. After learning Quinn was pregnant, he wanted to settle down with her on the Gold Coast, but he did not follow through with that plan, leaving Quinn to raise Ryder alone. This leads Alf to give Evan a "less-than-pleasant welcome", prompting him to almost leave Summer Bay.

== Amber Simmons ==
Amber Simmons
- Home and Away character
- Portrayed by: Maddy Jevic
- Duration: 2020–2021
- First appearance: 23 July 2020
- Last appearance: 5 May 2021
- Introduced by: Lucy Addario
In-universe information
- Occupation: Home carer
- Mother: Francesca Simmons
- Brothers: Jai
- Sons: Jai Simmons

Amber Simmons, played by Maddy Jevic, made her first appearance on 23 July 2020. The character and Jevic's casting details were reported on in the 22 June 2020 issue of TV Soap. Jevic, who was a fan of Home and Away when she was younger, began filming in January and said the cast and crew had been "welcoming and warm" towards her. Jevic previously played nurse Lee Radcliffe in Wentworth and found Amber to be a completely different character, which made the role more appealing to her. She commented, "I love my character, she's fun to play." Amber is a home carer hired to help John Palmer (Shane Withington), who has become wheelchair-reliant following a stroke. Don Groves of IF Magazine described her as "loyal, funny and tough." Writers gave her connections to Willow Harris (Sarah Roberts), Dean Thompson (Patrick O'Connor) and Colby Thorne (Tim Franklin), as she grew up in Mangrove River with them. Amber and Dean used to date, and "old wounds are reopened" when she meets Colby and learns he is a police officer. On 3 May 2021, Stephanie Chase of Digital Spy confirmed that both Amber and her son Jai Simmons (River Jarvis) would be leaving the serial that month.

Amber comes to meet John Palmer, who is in need of home care following a stroke. Amber sends John's wife Marilyn Chambers (Emily Symons) away and tries to get him out of his wheelchair. John does not like Amber's attitude and threatens to have her fired. She tells him that she needs the job and he needs a carer, so they should work together. As she is encouraging John to walk, Amber mentions his wife and marriage, which John takes offence to. He tells her to leave, as she is fired. Amber gets a drink at Salt, where she meets her old friend Dean Thompson and asks him to take her home to bed, however, he tells her he is waiting for his girlfriend, Ziggy Astoni (Sophie Dillman), who arrives shortly after. The following day, Amber comes face-to-face with Colby Thorne on the beach and she punches him. She then turns up at John's place and tells him that she is staying, despite his protests. Amber takes John to the gym to continue his rehabilitation, where she is confronted by Colby's sister Bella Nixon (Courtney Miller). Amber tells John that Colby is responsible for her brother Jai's death, and she later tells Colby that she will never forgive him for walking away from the car crash. Amber also learns Willow Harris lives and works in the Bay, but is cold towards her. Colby tells Amber that he is sorry, but she should not take out her anger on Dean and Willow, as they did not do anything wrong. Amber finds Willow and asks her to meet up for a drink at Salt, having forgiven her and Dean. Amber leaves with Tane Parata (Ethan Browne) and they spend the night together.

== Owen Davidson ==
Owen Davidson
- Home and Away character
- Portrayed by: Cameron Daddo
- First appearance: 24 August 2020
- Last appearance: 12 November 2020
- Introduced by: Lucy Addario
In-universe information
- Brothers: Evan Slater
- Nephews: Ryder Jackson

Owen Davidson, played by Cameron Daddo, made his first appearance on 24 August 2020. The casting and character details were confirmed by Women's Day on 17 August 2020. Owen is the estranged twin brother of Evan Slater, also played by Daddo. Of playing two different roles on Home and Away, Daddo said "Fortunately, I had some time between playing the two characters. I was able to put Evan 'to bed' and then create the backstory of Owen. Thankfully, I never played the two at the same time... now that would have been fun!" Daddo explained that when he joined the cast of Home and Away as Evan, he knew there would be an end date, but he soon wanted them to extend his time and joked that the producers could have found a cure for Evan's terminal illness. He said he was "thrilled" when they pitched the character of Owen to him. Owen also becomes a love interest for Roo Stewart (Georgie Parker). The character's exit scenes aired on 12 November 2020.

Owen visits Summer Bay on a whim and is spotted by Ryder Jackson (Lukas Radovich) and Alf Stewart (Ray Meagher) in the surf club. They tell him about his resemblance to Ryder's recently deceased father Evan Slater and convince him to come home with them, where he meets Ryder's aunt Roo Stewart. Owen decides to stay in the Bay to learn more about his family history and later discovers that he and Evan are twins, who were separated at birth and adopted. Owen asks Ryder and Roo to tell him all about Evan and Ryder lends him Evan's guitar, so he will feel a connection to his brother. Ryder later shows Owen around the town. Upon returning to the caravan park, Owen has tea with Roo and they talk about Evan, but she becomes overwhelmed and leaves. She later asks Owen out for a drink and opens up about how she was with Evan when he died and the shock she felt when Owen showed up in the Bay. Owen says that they should start from the beginning and Roo can get to know the real him. Owen asks Roo how close she and Evan got and she replies that if they had known each other longer, they could have grown quite close romantically. Owen points out that Evan chose her to be with him at the end, so he must have trusted her. He is glad Evan had her watching over him and Roo thanks him. The following day, Owen asks Roo on a dinner date, which she accepts. Owen asks Ryder for some advice about dating Roo. However, Roo backs out of the date at the last minute.

Owen asks Roo out again and their date is a success. Following a second date, Owen and Roo kiss and their relationship progresses quickly. Ryder warns Owen not to hurt his aunt. Roo invites Owen to a family dinner, where Alf tries interrogating him. In the morning, Owen's mood changes and when Ryder confronts him, Owen reveals that it is his birthday and he has been thinking about Evan. Roo then organises a lunch to celebrate Owen and Evan's birthday. Owen decides to leave the Bay and Alf has to point out that his decision has hurt Roo. Owen admits to Roo that he was only thinking of himself and he invites her to join him on a visit to Evan's grave. Weeks later, Roo returns to the Bay alone and ignores Owen's calls. It emerges that she called Owen by his brother's name while they were in bed and then left in the night. When Owen eventually turns up, Roo tries to avoid him and he realises that her family dislike him. Roo admits that she did not say anything and they have come up with their own conclusions. Roo struggles to talk to Owen, leaving him frustrated and he storms off. He later apologises and asks if Roo wants to work through things and Roo admits that she wants that too. Roo and Owen spend some intimate time together and try to work out their relationship, but Owen believes Roo is still in love with Evan. They end their relationship and Owen leaves the Bay.

== Taylor Rosetta ==
Taylor Rosetta
- Home and Away character
- Portrayed by: Annabelle Stephenson
- First appearance: 26 August 2020
- Last appearance: 26 November 2020
- Introduced by: Lucy Addario
In-universe information
- Occupation: Physiotherapist
- Husband: Angelo Rosetta

Taylor Rosetta, played by Annabelle Stephenson, made her first appearance on 26 August 2020. The character and Stephenson's casting details were announced on 1 August 2020. The actress originally recorded an audition tape for the serial in 2019 while she was living in Italy, but she did not get the role. After returning to Australia, she read for the part of Taylor and was cast. She relocated to Sydney for filming that same week. Stephenson found the filming style more relaxed, commenting "It's the Aussie spirit, it's so welcoming. You just come in, do your job and leave." Stephenson called her character "a friendly and fiercely independent woman". Taylor is married to Angelo Rosetta (Luke Jacobz), who returns to Summer Bay after a long absence. Explaining their backstory, Stephenson said that Taylor fell in love with Angelo while she was studying physiotherapy. She liked his "passion and focus", as well as his good looks and charming personality. However, Taylor feels that her husband has been neglecting her, so she has an affair with his suspect Colby Thorne (Tim Franklin). Stephenson told Kerry Harvey of Stuff.co.nz that she and Franklin were old friends and they had often joked about how funny they would find working together as an on-screen couple. She also pointed out that Taylor and Colby's relationship would not end well, saying "It can only go one way and that's how we see the story play out. It involves so much love, betrayal – there are so many interwoven plotlines underneath the murder investigation. It's a pretty wild ride for everyone."

Taylor joins her husband Angelo in Summer Bay, where he is working on a homicide case. She befriends Colby Thorne and later tells him that Angelo was annoyed by him. Colby overhears an argument between Angelo and Taylor, so when he comes across Taylor at the local restaurant, he offers her comfort. Angelo later tells Taylor that his investigation has come to a standstill, so Taylor tries to get him to spend time with her. Colby invites Taylor for coffee, where he flirts and flatters her. He introduces her to gym manager Willow Harris (Sarah Roberts), who offers to help Taylor get some new clients. After Angelo cancels their dinner plans to concentrate on a new lead in the case, Taylor visits Colby at home and offers him a massage to say thank you. The pair kiss, but are interrupted by Colby's sister Bella Nixon (Courtney Miller). When Angelo leaves town to chase up a lead, Taylor and Colby have sex at a motel. They begin an affair as Taylor continues to feel neglected by Angelo. When Taylor realises that Willow, Bella and Dean Thompson (Patrick O'Connor) know about the affair, she tries to end it.

== Christian Green ==
Christian Green, played by Ditch Davey, made his first appearance on 16 September 2020. The character and Davey's casting details were announced on 19 June 2020. Davey felt fortunate to receive the role, saying "It is never a bad time getting a job but particularly at the moment, I am very fortunate. It just felt like a good fit at the moment." Christian is a doctor who is "brought in to try to resolve a health crisis and becomes intertwined within the community." Jess Lee of Digital Spy said the character is billed as being arrogant, which "puts a few noses out of joint at the hospital", but he also has a softer side and a sense of humour. Later casting details confirmed that the character is a neurosurgeon, who comes to Northern Districts Hospital to consult on Justin Morgan's (James Stewart) spinal tumour diagnosis. He is also a love interest for Justin's sister and fellow doctor Tori Morgan (Penny McNamee). In September 2021, it was confirmed Davey and McNamee would be leaving Home and Away that same month, as their characters marry and relocate to London.

== Kieran Baldivis ==
Kieran Baldivis
- Home and Away character
- Portrayed by: Rick Donald
- Duration: 2020–2021
- First appearance: 26 November 2020
- Last appearance: 12 August 2021
- Introduced by: Lucy Addario
In-universe information
- Occupation: Gym manager
- Mother: Martha Stewart
- Half-sisters: Roo Stewart

Kieran Baldivis, played by Rick Donald, made his first appearance on 26 November 2020. Donald's casting was confirmed by his appearance in a promotional trailer for the show's upcoming storylines, while further details about his character were revealed on 23 November 2020. Donald previously appeared in Home and Away as guest character Dean O'Mara in 2011, which was one of his first television roles. He admitted that he was "instantly keen" when the show's producers told him about Kieran. Of re-joining the show, he commented "I'm now living up in Palm Beach, which is where they shoot the show, so being able to literally walk to work has been pretty amazing – especially during all of this coronavirus madness."

Kieran is Martha Stewart's (Belinda Giblin) estranged and "deeply troubled" son. Donald was excited to join the Stewart family and work alongside Giblin, Ray Meagher (Alf Stewart) and Georgie Parker (Roo Stewart). He stated "I knew Kieran was going to come in and be a bit of a tornado in the Stewart household. He turns up when he was told not to, and is very keen to put things right with his mum." Donald also explained that Kieran has "some mental health issues and he has some addiction problems", which means he is not a regular "bad boy" character. Donald liked that there are a lot of layers to Kieran, adding "he's trying to turn it all around, so that was pretty exciting for me – the fact that there's a real three-dimensional character in Kieran."

Kieran is an alcoholic and his anger management issues led his mother to cut him out of her life. Kieran sends Martha a letter, before turning up in Summer Bay to see her. He meets her husband Alf and his half-sister Roo. Kieran stays at the Caravan Park and is only allowed to see Martha if he is supervised. He secures a job at the local gym after pressuring owner Jasmine Delaney (Sam Frost) into hiring him. As he attempts to reconnect with Martha, his presence causes problems between her and Alf, and Kieran decides to leave town. Not long after, Martha suffers hallucinations and begins seeing Kieran around the Bay. After receiving treatment, Martha goes to clean out her art studio and finds Kieran inside. Martha initially assumes she is imagining him and calls Alf and Roo, causing Kieran to flee. After he spends the night drinking, Kieran returns and kidnaps Martha. He forces her to drive them away from Summer Bay, but Martha manages to call the police while Kieran stops at a petrol station and he is arrested.

Some months later, Kieran's lawyer informs Roo that he has been released on a good behaviour bond and wants to contact the family. Kieran comes to the Bay and tells Roo that he is twelve weeks sober. She invites him to stay on the couch, as there are no caravans available. Although Ryder Jackson (Lukas Radovich) is wary of Kieran's presence at first, he warms to him after Kieran offers his support when his taco van explodes. Kieran later admits to Roo that he has not met all of his bail conditions because he needs an AA sponsor. When he checks in at the police station, Kieran tells Constable Cash Newman (Nicholas Cartwright), who arranges for Kieran to attend a local AA meeting, where he eventually finds a sponsor. Roo learns Alf and Martha are coming back to town soon, but after Alf hears that Kieran is in the Bay, he returns home early. He wants Kieran to leave, but Roo arranges for them all to sit down and talk. However, Kieran does not show up and he buys a bottle of scotch. Ryder comes across him in an alley and sits with him until Roo arrives. She praises Kieran for not opening the bottle and he opens up about facing Alf. When Kieran and Alf do finally meet, Kieran explains what happened and Alf asks him to leave. Roo goes with him and they stay in a motel for the night. Irene Roberts (Lynne McGranger) and Jasmine later invite Kieran to move in with them. Jasmine is initially awkward with Kieran, but he apologises for his previous actions and opens up to her about his journey. Alf refuses to accept Kieran has changed, which leads Kieran to pack his bags, but Roo and Jasmine convince him not to leave.

Kieran gives Alf a letter for Martha, and promises that if Martha does not want to see him, he will accept it and move on. Alf agrees to give her the letter and when Martha returns a few days later, she meets with Kieran to hear him out. Martha tells Kieran that she read his letter, but she does not tell him what she thought about it and asks what he wants from her. He tells that he is serious about his recovery, unlike before when he was never ready. Martha says that she does not trust what he will do in the future, and Kieran is left not knowing where he stands. While thanking Jasmine for her support, Kieran tries to kiss her, but she pulls away and he flees the house. Jasmine follows him, but he shouts at her to leave him alone. Jasmine later finds Kieran and he apologises for snapping at her. While he is explaining how his counsellor advised him to get some space while he is losing control, Jasmine collapses and suffers a seizure. Alf and Martha come across Kieran trying to rouse her, but Alf accuses him of attacking her instead. The police attend the scene and Alf continues to accuse Kieran of hurting Jasmine, until she comes round and states that is not true. At Irene's, Jasmine admits that she did not take her medication and Kieran realises that he distracted her. He decides to move out and while everyone tries to talk him out of it, Martha declares that he needs his family and asks him to come home with her. Despite Roo organising a family dinner and Kieran being polite, Alf continues to be unwelcoming to him. Kieran realises that the situation cannot go on and he decides to leave the Bay. Martha asks him to take care of her house in Merimbula and organises him a job in a bakery. Alf offers Kieran a handshake before he leaves and Roo drives him to the station.

== Lewis Hayes ==
Lewis Hayes
- Home and Away character
- Portrayed by: Luke Arnold
- Duration: 2020–2021
- First appearance: 30 November 2020
- Last appearance: 20 April 2021
- Introduced by: Lucy Addario
In-universe information
- Occupation: Agency nurse Nursing unit manager
- Wife: Anna Jobson

Lewis Hayes, played by Luke Arnold, made his first appearance on 30 November 2020. Arnold's casting was confirmed in early November, while his character's details were revealed later that month. Of joining the show, he commented "Almost every other Aussie actor I know has had their turn on Home and Away over the years, so I'm stoked to finally get my shot." Arnold told a Who reporter that he would be with the serial for "a few months." He confirmed that his character, Lewis, is on "a revenge mission" and would also be a love interest for Jasmine Delaney, played by Sam Frost. Like Jasmine, Lewis is a nurse. Arnold was given help and advice from the nurses employed by Home and Away to portray his character's occupation accurately. Explaining their characters' fictional backstory, Arnold said "Lewis and Jasmine had a fling back in the day. But once that ended, he went off, found the love of his life, but unfortunately she passed away." Lewis comes to Summer Bay to confront Christian Green (Ditch Davey), the surgeon who he blames for his partner's death, but after meeting Jasmine again, he is "torn" between their potential relationship and his obsession with Christian.

While passing through Graydon Prison reception, Lewis notices his former colleague Jasmine Delaney. He tells her that he is an agency nurse and is currently working in the prison infirmary. He then invites Jasmine to get a coffee with him sometime, which she accepts. After her visit with Colby Thorne (Tim Franklin), Lewis brings her a coffee and they decide to spend the afternoon together. As they enter the Summer Bay Surf Club, Kieran Baldivis (Rick Donald) approaches Jasmine about a job at her gym, but Lewis has to tell him to back off as he is too persistent. As they talk over drinks, Lewis notices Jasmine's wedding ring and she tells him that her husband died last year. He also reveals that his partner Anna died in a car accident. The following day, Lewis is called to the prison exercise yard after Colby is attacked. He manages to revive Colby and accompanies him to the hospital, where Christian Green takes over treatment. When Jasmine is told by the guards that she cannot contact Colby's sister, Bella Nixon (Courtney Miller), Lewis goes with her to inform Bella and Dean Thompson (Patrick O'Connor). They come up with a plan to distract the guards and get Bella and Dean into visit Colby. Jasmine and Lewis spend the day together as she shows him around the Bay. He asks her about Christian and learns that they had a few issues early on, as he is dating the mother of Jasmine's stepdaughter. Lewis gets a transfer to Northern Districts to work alongside Jasmine. Lewis reads a patient's file and tells Jasmine that he is checking that Christian has not made any mistakes, as he is a danger to his patients. He later explains that Christian was Anna's surgeon. When she developed a secondary brain bleed, Christian could not be contacted and Anna later died. Lewis blames Christian for taking unnecessary risks.

Lewis successfully applies for the nursing unit manager position at the hospital. He and Jasmine admit that they have feelings for one another. Lewis attends Christian and Tori's engagement party with Jasmine. When a patient with a head injury is admitted to the hospital later that evening, Lewis stops Christian from performing surgery by pointing out that he was drinking at the party. Christian defends himself and Tori has to stop the pair from arguing. Christian confronts Lewis after the patient dies and demands that he is sacked. Tori later asks Lewis if working with Christian will be a problem, but he assures her that it will not be. On his first day at nursing unit manager, Lewis undermines Christian while treating Marilyn Chambers (Emily Symons). Jasmine encourages him to tell Christian about Anna, and he eventually does so in front of the department. Christian sits down with Lewis and explains how he did everything he could to save Anna and their unborn child. He also apologises for not remembering her. Lewis feels like Christian has taken responsibility for Anna's death, but Christian later corrects him saying that he was sorry for her death, not that he was responsible. Lewis and Jasmine consummate their relationship. Wanting revenge on Christian for Anna's death, Lewis attempts to inject patient Ari Parata (Rob Kipa-Williams) with potassium, so Christian will get the blame when Ari dies, but he is interrupted by Ari's partner Mia Anderson (Anna Samson). Lewis kills another of Christian's patients instead, leading to an inquiry into whether Christian is at fault. Christian later punches Lewis when he goads him and Lewis files a complaint, leading to Christian's suspension. The autopsy finds that Christian was not at fault for the patient's death and his suspension is lifted, as the incident happened off site. Lewis tells Jasmine that he is trying to understand what else he has to do to make Christian pay. Christian later asks if they can put their differences aside and concentrate on their jobs, but Lewis refuses.

Lewis reports Christian to the police for assault, but is angered when Christian only receives a fine. Lewis tries goading Christian into punching him again, but Alf sprays them both with a hose to stop them. Jasmine questions whether he is looking for justice or revenge, and advises him to speak to a counsellor. Lewis then attacks Christian and holds him hostage in a disused hospital ward. He asks Christian to admit that he was responsible for Anna's death, but Christian refuses to confess to something he did not do. He pleads with Lewis to let him go and think of Jasmine, but Lewis administers a lethal injection and watches as Christian's heart stops. Jasmine and Tori find them and Tori works to save Christian, while Lewis leaves the hospital. He later shows up in Jasmine's bedroom and tries to explain that Christian was a danger to other patients, only for Jasmine to denounce Lewis for his actions and retort that Anna would not think highly of what Lewis has done if she were still alive, and then reveals that Lewis's attempt to kill Christian has failed, as Christian is still alive and is recovering, causing Lewis to break down emotionally and beg Jasmine to make it all stop. Ultimately, a saddened and defeated Lewis turns himself in to the police, and he apologises to Jasmine. Jasmine later tells Tori that Lewis pleaded guilty to the murder of three patients and the attempted murder of Christian.

== Others ==
Date(s)	Character	Actor	Circumstances
27 January	Hostage Taker #3	Emanuele Battaglia	Members of the Ouroboros gang who have taken hostages in the hospital emergency department. One of them checks the stairwell and finds a phone playing a recorded message, before Dean Thompson knocks him out and disarms him.
27 January	Hostage Taker #4	Rik-Mei Karena	Members of the Ouroboros gang who have taken hostages in the hospital emergency department. One of them checks the stairwell and finds a phone playing a recorded message, before Dean Thompson knocks him out and disarms him.
27 January–	Ambulance Officer/ Paramedic Charlie	Kathryn Schuback	The ambulance officer brings Robbo to Northern Districts Hospital following a car crash. Alex Neilson tells her that the ED is closed, but the officer says they would have lost him if they took him elsewhere. Weeks later, the ambulance officer brings Colby Thorne in after he is stabbed in the leg. She also admits Ben Astoni when he collapses due to serotonin syndrome, and is called to treat and transport John Palmer when he has a stroke. The character was initially credited as Ambulance Officer, before being credited as Paramedic Charlie.
27 January–	Freya Bozic	Francisca Braithwaite	A nurse at Northern Districts Hospital. She monitors Robbo after he undergoes surgery, and later helps when he goes into cardiac arrest. Months later, she and Alex Neilson rush to treat Colby Thorne when they notice he is tachycardic and his blood pressure has dropped. Freya later invites fellow nurse Jasmine Delaney to drinks at Salt with her and some of their other colleagues. Weeks later, while she is helping Evan Slater, Freya interrupts his conversation with Alf Stewart to tell them that she needs to get Evan back to his room. She later informs Evan's son Ryder Jackson that Evan has discharged himself. Freya helps administer sodium bicarbonate to Christian Green to counter a lethal dose of potassium, as Tori Morgan tries to restart his heart.
3 February	AFP Chaplain	Winston Cooper	The chaplain conducts Robbo's funeral.
3 February	Terence Salisbury	Howard Stone	Lance Salisbury's father attends the funeral of Robbo, whose father tells the mourners a story of their early days in the AFP.
5 February	Journalist	Deborah An	The journalist talks to Marilyn Chambers about Ari Parata's heroic efforts to save hostages during the hospital siege.
11–19 February	Patricia Hendersen	Sharni McDermott	A counsellor who meets with Bella Nixon. She tries to talk to Bella about her recent overdose and history with her father, but Bella refuses to open up. Bella's brother Colby Thorne asks Patricia if he can book another session for Bella, as she said it went well, but Patricia tells him that Bella did not engage with her and obviously has deep trust issues. She recommends finding another counsellor better suited to Bella's needs, but Colby books another session with her. Patricia finds Bella at the pier with her friend Ryder Jackson, and Bella tells her that Ryder thinks she should be more open to counselling. Patricia asks that they have a chat to see if he is right. Their session goes well, until Patricia brings up the subject of Bella's father, which she does not want to talk about. Patricia advises her to open up about difficult subjects to stop her pattern of high risk behaviour.
18–19 February	Jason	James Biasetto	Mackenzie Booth's former boyfriend, who matches with her on a dating app, and comes to meet her at Salt. Jason asks Mackenzie for his half of the money she stole from her father. Mackenzie tells Jason that she does not owe him anything, as he only gave her advice. She also admits that she got caught and is paying the money back. Her brother Dean Thompson tells Jason to leave, and he hides out in the gym, before returning to talk to Mackenzie. She threatens to call the police, and after telling him again that she does not owe him any money, Jason attempts to tell the patrons of Salt about her embezzlement. He then suggests that Mackenzie makes him her business partner. Constable Colby Thorne informs Jason that extortion with menace carries a ten-year jail sentence, and warns him that a court case would not go in his favour. He then tells him to leave Summer Bay and Jason goes.
26–27 February	Douglas	Adam Booth	A man who holds Leah Patterson hostage at his home by scaring her into obeying and serving him. When he notices a message from her partner Justin Morgan on her blog, he forces her to contact Justin and tell him that she no longer loves him. Douglas is not happy when he notices Leah crying and he beats her, before locking her in a bedroom. He later shows her a wedding dress, telling her that it is time he made her his wife. Douglas asks Leah to make herself up to look like his former wife. As he fixes her veil, Leah hits Douglas over the head with a torch and flees the house. Douglas follows her and watches Justin rescue Leah from the road. The police raid the house, and Douglas emerges from a cupboard to stab Colby Thorne in the leg with a pair of scissors. He is soon arrested by Colby's colleagues. Douglas later pleads guilty to his charges, so Leah does not have to testify, and he receives a 25-year prison sentence.
27 April	Danny	Bryden White-Tuohey	Nikau Parata and Bella Nixon are interrupted by Danny and his friend Blake Gowan, who want the pool table after them. Bella proposes they play for the table, and Nikau asks Danny to go easy, as he is trying to impress her. Danny and Blake win the game, but Bella asks if they want to play for money. Danny asks Nikau if he is sure they want to play again, and they lay down their bets. Bella and Nikau win the game and leave.
27 April	Gavin	Steve Carroll	A customer at the Pier Diner who tells Leah Patterson that his order is wrong. When he calls her "sweetheart", Leah yells at him and he apologises for upsetting her, before calling her crazy. He then leaves the Diner.
28 April	Ingrid Stone	Amy Kersey	A woman from Victims Services who meets with Leah Patterson to help her write an impact statement. She asks Leah how her ordeal with Douglas Maynard has affected her. Leah talks about the abuse she suffered and how badly it has affected her relationship with her partner, Justin Morgan.
30 April	Steve	Cramer Cain	A worker at the Bridge Farm Equine Centre, a therapy centre. He shows Bella Nixon, Colby Thorne and Willow Harris around, before asking Bella to select a horse and name it. As Bella works with the horse, Steve tells Colby and Willow that they should think about leaving soon. He also asks Bella for her phone, which she reluctantly hands over. As Colby and Willow leave, Steve says he will give them progress reports and he pulls Bella away from the car. He then follows Bella when she starts running after Colby and Willow.
30 April	Annabelle	Monique Riley	A woman sleeping in Tane Parata's bed, who is woken up by his ringing phone.
6 May 2020, 15 July 2021	Ultra Sound Technician	Elizabeth McLean	The ultra sound technician carries out Jasmine Delaney's ultrasound, but she cannot find a baby. The following year, she carries out Mia Anderson's 12-week scan and informs her and Ari Parata that they are having a girl.
7 May	Cindy	Sarah Halloran	A woman who has spent the night with Tane Parata. She leaves the house just as Nikau Parata and Ryder Jackson arrive.
24 June	Melissa	Kelly Zacharias	A woman who recognises Jasmine Delaney from a picture on an online mother's forum when she comes to the Summer Bay gym. Jasmine and her stepdaughter Grace Morgan spend the afternoon with Melissa and her son, Tyler. Jasmine asks Melissa to keep her identity a secret on the forum, as her husband is an undercover police officer. Melissa agrees, and tells Jasmine that they should get their family's together sometime.
24 June	Baby Tyler	Aurora Williams	A woman who recognises Jasmine Delaney from a picture on an online mother's forum when she comes to the Summer Bay gym. Jasmine and her stepdaughter Grace Morgan spend the afternoon with Melissa and her son, Tyler. Jasmine asks Melissa to keep her identity a secret on the forum, as her husband is an undercover police officer. Melissa agrees, and tells Jasmine that they should get their family's together sometime.
8 July	Anna Davies	Lou Pollard	A passport control officer, who checks in Gemma Parata, but asks Ari Parata to step to the side due to a security notice. His brother Tane Parata and nephew Nikau Parata are also stopped, and Anna tells Tane to get off his phone when he calls Gemma. Anne then explains that a block was put on their passports and advises Ari to seek legal advice.
11 August–	Sergeant Cooper	John Atkinson	The sergeant calls Colby Thorne and Bella Nixon to the police station to inform them that they have found the body of Ross Nixon, Bella's father. The following year, Sergeant Cooper and a constable are called to the Caravan Park by Alf Stewart and Roo Stewart to arrest Kieran Baldivis, after he tried to assault Alf. Sergeant Cooper reveals there is an outstanding warrant out on Kieran for domestic violence offences. Martha Stewart says Kieran has gone, so the sergeant calls the station to organise a search.
13 August	Counsellor Peta	Beth Champion	A counsellor who sees Jasmine Delaney about her unhealthy attachment to her stepdaughter Grace Morgan. Peta soon gets Jasmine to open up about her deceased husband Robbo and her previous therapy due to abandonment issues. Peta suggests that Jasmine needs to forgive Robbo for leaving her, and to visit his grave.
20 August	Dale the Camp Manager	Bryce Youngman	The campsite manager tells Mackenzie Booth, Ari Parata and Tane Parata that he sold a car to Nikau Parata and Bella Nixon, who passed through the camp a couple of days earlier. He also pointed out some places of interest and he circles them on a map for Tane.
24 August 2020 – 22 February 2022	Jai Simmons	River Jarvis	Amber Simmons and Dean Thompson's young son. Amber brings Jai to Summer Bay to meet Dean for the first time, although she does not tell him that Dean is his father. Dean and Jai bond by playing football and having lunch together. He also introduces Jai to his girlfriend Ziggy Astoni. Jai eventually works out that Dean is his father. Amber asks Dean to look after Jai for the day while she goes to work, but he has to cancel and Amber briefly bans him from seeing Jai. A couple of weeks later, Jai comes to stay with Dean for the night. He soon develops a temperature and Dean asks Ziggy, then Tori Morgan for help. Tori diagnoses an ear infection. When Amber returns in the morning, Dean refuses to let her take Jai until she has sobered up. Amber and Jai spend his birthday in the Bay, where Amber's mother Francesca Simmons joins them. Dean buys Jai a bike for his birthday and teaches him to ride it. Days later, Dean finds Francesca has left Jai home alone, so he takes him to an old River Boys house to spend some time together. He later returns Jai to Amber. Not long after, Dean, Amber and Jai spend the evening together and Amber brings Jai over the following morning. Amber later leaves town with Jai. Months later, Amber brings Jai back to the Bay and they move in with Dean, so Jai can attend his old school. Amber and Dean soon reunite. Jai is delighted when Dean wins tickets to Movie World through a surf comp. Shortly after, Amber and Dean break up and she and Jai leave the Bay to move in with Francesca.
26 August	Ambulance Officer #2	Jennine Kelly	The ambulance officer and Ambo Ken attend to Justin Morgan, who was found by Alf Stewart unconscious amid hydrofluoric acid, which has burnt his arm.
16 September 2020 – 11 March 2021	Leon	Will McNeill	Leon comes to Summer Bay looking for Tane Parata as he has another job for him, but Tane is not interested. Leon and his friend visit Salt for a drink and they scare off some customers, leading Mackenzie Booth to ask them to leave. Tane manhandles them towards the door, but Leon smashes a bottle and slashes Tane's stomach, before he and his friend flee the restaurant. A few weeks later, Leon turns up at the Parata's house with Paul, who Tane owes money too. As a fight breaks out, Leon threatens Tane with a baseball bat, but drops it when the police arrive to arrest everyone. Tane makes up a story about Leon catching him with his girlfriend, which the others go along with, so they are released. Leon accompanies Paul to a meeting with Tane, and later collects the money from the courier job Tane carries out for them. Leon and Paul meet with Mackenzie who offers her car to pay off Tane's debt. Paul and Leon blackmail Ari Parata and Tane into carrying out an armed robbery in Reefton Lakes. However, Ari and Tane tell them that they cannot do the job alone. As the group are getting ready, the River Boys, led by Dean Thompson and Heath Braxton, turn up and beat Leon and Paul for being on their territory, before driving off with them. Weeks later, Paul has Ari and Tane's nephew Nikau Parata kidnapped, along with Bella Nixon, Ryder Jackson and Chloe Anderson. When Tane and Ari arrive at the scene, Leon shows them his injured hand courtesy of the River Boys. He then joins in the fight that breaks out and is later arrested.
24 September 2020, 11 August 2021	Dr Stevens	Wadih Dona	An anaesthesiologist who administers anaesthetic to Justin Morgan ahead of his spinal surgery. He and Christian Green later remark on the size of the spinal tumour. Dr Stevens notices that Justin's blood pressure is fluctuating, and then dropping when Christian realises removing the tumour is going to be more complicated than he first thought. As Justin's sister Tori Morgan is forced to make a decision about what to do, Dr Stevens informs them that Justin's blood pressure is continuing to drop. The following year, Dr Stevens monitors Nikau Parata, as Christian relieves a bleed on his brain. The character was credited as Dr Stevens, but named Dr Kevin Stephens on-screen.
13–22 October	Francesca Simmons	Joanne Hunt	Amber Simmons' mother. She arrives for her grandson Jai Simmons's birthday and is cold towards Jai's father, Dean Thompson, due to his criminal past in Mangrove River and is critical of his present choice for Jai. Francesca tells Dean if she had her way, Dean would not be in Jai's life. At the end of the party, Dean warns Francesca not to put him down in front of Jai again and threatens that there will be trouble if she does. The following week, Amber tells her mother that Dean is planning on taking legal action to get proper access to Jai, so Francesca comes to his home to confront him. She comes face to face with Colby Thorne, who she blames for her son's death, and tells him not to utter a word to her. She tells Dean that he will regret his decision and she will make sure he will never see Jai again. Francesca then finds Amber arguing with Mackenzie Booth at the Surf Club. She tells Amber that Dean will be a bad influence on Jai and she needs to get him out of their lives, but Amber counters that she will work it out with him. Francesa later leaves Dean's police record on the doorstep with a note telling him that he will not win a custody case. When she leaves Jai alone at her home, Dean takes him for the night, angering Amber who confronts Francesa about her behaviour.
2 November 2020 – 17 March 2021	Paul	Jack Finsterer	A man who has Tane Parata beaten up, as he owes him money. Paul visits Salt and asks owner Mackenzie Booth to tell Tane that his time is running out and he has until tomorrow. Paul turns up at the Parata's house the following day with Leon and some other men. Tane's brother Ari Parata confronts him and Paul demands his money. A fight breaks out and the police arrive. Colby Thorne tries to get Paul to talk, but he refuses and they are all taken to the station, where they all lie about Leon and Tane fighting over a girl. Tane meets with Paul and Leon after a brick is thrown through the Parata's window. He asks what he has to do to stop everything and Paul tells him that he has one last courier job for him. Ari then turns up and agrees to do the job with Tane. Paul and Leon meet with Mackenzie who offers her car to pay off Tane's debt, which Paul accepts. However, Paul later blackmails Ari and Tane into carrying out an armed robbery. Ari and Tane tell Paul and Leon that they cannot do the job alone and either they come with them or the job is off. Later that night, as they are getting ready, the River Boys, led by Dean Thompson and Heath Braxton, turn up and beat Leon and Paul for being on their territory, before driving off with them. Weeks later, Paul has Ari and Tane's nephew Nikau Parata kidnapped, along with Bella Nixon, Ryder Jackson and Chloe Anderson. He calls Tane the following morning to let him know he has Nikau. Tane and Ari arrive at the scene and Paul taunts Ari by threatening Chloe. Ryder hits him over the head with a piece of wood, as a fight breaks out between the Paratas and the gang. Nikau drives Bella, Ryder and Chloe away, but later returns and sees Paul drive past him. Paul later strikes Ari with his car and leaves him injured by the road. He meets with Tane, who beats him and then takes him to the hospital. Tane tells the doctors to call the police.
16–17 November	Katherine	Neveen Hanna	Colby Thorne's lawyer, who represents him at his trial for Ross Nixon's murder. When Taylor Rosetta enters the court, Katherine surmises that she must have been dropped from the witness list. She later objects to the introduction of a recording in which Colby admits shooting his step father, but the judge allows it. Katherine later advises Colby not to take the witness stand, but he goes up and changes his plea to guilty.
16–17 November	Judge	Tracy Mann	The judge presiding over Colby Thorne's trial for murder. When Colby confesses to shooting his stepfather, the judge asks if he wishes to change his plea to guilty and he does. She then sentences him to 25 years in prison.
16–17 November	Michael Finau	Ray Chong Nee	The prosecutor in Colby Thorne's murder trial. He introduces a crucial recording in which Colby admits to shooting his step father and questions Willow Harris about the confession.
16 November	Bailiff	Peter Cook	The bailiff is ordered to remove Dean Thompson from the court room when he begins shouting. When Colby Thorne takes the stand, the bailiff asks him to swear the oath that he will tell the truth.
25 November 2020– 3 March 2022	Officer Martinez	Shameer Birges	A guard at Graydon Prison. He tells Colby Thorne that he has a visitor, but not who. He later tells Colby and Bella Nixon that visiting time is over. Officer Martinez accompanies Colby to the hospital when he is attacked. When Colby has to go for a scan, Martinez informs Christian Green that an officer needs to be present, so Officer King goes with them. Martinez tells Jasmine Delaney that he liked Colby and then stops her from calling his sister. Both officers run to help staff when some River Boys cause a scene in the hospital. When Bella and Dean Thompson come to visit Colby a few weeks later, Martinez informs them that Colby will not be receiving visitors, as he is in solitary confinement. When Bella walks away, Martinez hands Dean a letter from Colby. The following year, Officer Martinez escorts Ari Parata to the hospital and asks Mia Anderson for ID when she approaches them. He refuses to let her in to see Ari until he clears her. He also checks the IDs for Ari's brothers and tells them that he does not have any details on what happened.
26 November	Tammy	Bernie Van Tiel	A woman who helps Dean Thompson out when he gets into a fight at a pub in Mangrove River. She tells him that the police are on their way and invites him to her home, where they have sex. As Dean goes to leave, Tammy tells him he can stay with her if he wants, but he rejects her and leaves without thanking her for her help.
26 November	Jess	Kara Sheehan	A woman who buys Dean Thompson a beer.
26 November 2020, 10 February 2021	River Boy Ray	Travis McCurry	A River Boy gang member who overhears Dean Thompson telling Ari Parata to get lost. He asks Dean whether Ari is bothering him, and if Dean wants him and his friends to get rid of him, but Dean says he will deal with Ari. Weeks later, Dean plays pool with Ray, but they are interrupted by Bella Nixon and Dean asks Ray to go and get them some more beers.
30 November 2020– 11 February 2021	Joe	Shaun Anthony Robinson	A Graydon Prison inmate who addresses Colby Thorne as Constable and asks if he thought he would get away with it, revealing that everyone knows Colby is a police officer. Colby is then beaten by the group in the exercise yard. When Colby returns to the prison, Joe attacks him in the yard and Colby stabs him fatally.
