= Friends with Better Lives =

American television series

- Genre: Sitcom
- Created by: Dana Klein
- Starring: James Van Der Beek; Majandra Delfino; Zoe Lister-Jones; Brooklyn Decker; Rick Donald; Kevin Connolly
- Music by: Gabriel Mann
- Country of origin: United States
- Original language: English
- No. of seasons: 1
- No. of episodes: 13 (5 unaired)

Production
- Executive producers: Dana Klein; Aaron Kaplan; David Hemingson
- Camera setup: Multi-camera
- Running time: 22 minutes
- Production companies: Liscolaide Productions; Hemingson Entertainment; Kapital Entertainment; 20th Century Fox Television

Original release
- Network: CBS
- Release: March 31 – May 26, 2014

Friends with Better Lives is an American sitcom television series created by Dana Klein. The multi-camera series premiered on CBS on March 31, 2014, as part of the 2013–14 American television season.

On May 10, 2014, CBS canceled the series after only five episodes had aired. Later that day, it was reported that Friends with Better Lives was being shopped to other networks. To date, eight of the thirteen episodes produced have aired. The remaining five episodes were aired by DSTV in South Africa and were released on DVD in the US.

== Plot ==
Six people all think their friends have better lives. Will (James Van Der Beek) is a newly-single bachelor pining for his ex-wife; Jules (Brooklyn Decker) and Lowell (Rick Donald) are newly engaged; Kate (Zoe Lister-Jones) is a successful, single career woman who does not have the best luck with dating; and Andi (Majandra Delfino) and Bobby (Kevin Connolly) are a happily married couple with one child and one on the way, pining for their younger fun days.

== Cast ==
- James Van Der Beek as Will Stokes, a gynecologist who returns to the bachelor life after learning of his wife's infidelity
- Kevin Connolly as Bobby Lutz, a married man with two kids, who misses his young partying days
- Majandra Delfino as Andi Lutz, a married woman with two kids, who misses her young partying days
- Zoe Lister-Jones as Kate McLean, the Chief Operating Officer of a thriving social media company who doesn't have the best of luck when it comes to dating. The character's last name is mentioned as Piers in the episode "The Lost and Hound".
- Brooklyn Decker as Jules Talley, a former model and aspiring actress who recently became engaged to Lowell
- Rick Donald as Lowell Peddit, a spiritual, self-righteous, Australian environmentalist who is recently engaged to Jules

== Production and development ==
In September 2012, Friends with Better Lives first appeared as part of the CBS development slate. On January 22, 2013, CBS placed a pilot order. The pilot was written by Dana Klein and directed by James Burrows.

Casting announcements began in February 2013, with James Van Der Beek first cast in the role of Will Stokes, a gynecologist who returns to the bachelor life after learning of his wife's infidelity. Brooklyn Decker was the next actor cast, in the series regular role of Jules Talley, a former model and aspiring actress who recently became engaged to Lowell. Rick Donald then joined the series as Lowell Peddit, a spiritual, self-righteous environmentalist who is recently engaged to Jules. Shortly after, Kevin Connolly and Majandra Delfino signed onto the series regular roles of Bobby and Andi Lutz, a happily married couple with two kids, who miss their young partying days. Zoe Lister-Jones was the last actor cast in the series regular role of Kate McLean, the Chief Operating Officer of a thriving social media company who doesn't have the best of luck when it comes to dating.

On May 12, 2013, CBS placed a series order on Friends with Better Lives to premiere as part of the 2013–14 American television season.

== Episodes ==
No.	Title	Directed by	Written by	Original release date	Prod. code	U.S. viewers (millions)
1	"Pilot"	James Burrows	Dana Klein	March 31, 2014	1AWT79	7.63
Will reveals to his friends – the happily married Bobby and Andi, still-single Kate, and sexy couple Jules and Lowell – that he and his wife have finalized their divorce. Soon after, Jules and Lowell announce their engagement, which upsets Kate. Kate's friends then try to get her to be less picky when it comes to men.
2	"Window Pain"	Todd Holland	Adam Chase	April 14, 2014	1AWT02	5.69
Kate helps Will move on from his ex by taking him to a singles bar. It is quickly apparent that Will has "no game", as the only woman interested in him turns out to actually be seeking a threesome with him and Kate. Meanwhile, Andi's second pregnancy has progressed to the overly-amorous stage, which exhausts Bobby.
3	"Game Sext Match"	Fred Savage	Justin Nowell	April 21, 2014	1AWT06	5.41
Bobby reluctantly accepts the overly-competitive Lowell as his tennis partner for an upcoming tournament. The two are in line to win when two senior members of Bobby's office (Stephen Tobolowsky and George Wyner) blackmail him into throwing the championship match. Meanwhile, to prove to his friends he is not so conservative, Will is talked into texting a photo of his private parts to a girl he has only dated once.
4	"Pros and Cons"	Fred Savage	Kate VanDevender	April 28, 2014	1AWT04	6.11
Kate sleeps with Randy (Nick Zano), a man she thinks is her blind date, but he turns out to be a male prostitute. Meanwhile, Bobby and Will try to get rid of a rat that they discover in the house.
5	"The Bicycle Thieves"	Fred Savage	Michael Markowitz	May 5, 2014	1AWT05	4.92
Trying to prove they can drink like Lowell, Bobby and Will go out on the town with him, only to wake up the next morning to the realization that they stole police bicycles sometime during the night. Kate gets upset when a cashier (Jonathan Slavin) gives Jules special treatment, while Andi is upset to discover that Bobby has a former Playboy Playmate of the Year for a client.
6	"Yummy Mummy"	Victor Gonzalez	Nastaran Dibai	May 12, 2014	1AWT07	4.81
Kate thinks she's found the perfect guy, but freaks out after he announces he has a daughter. The daughter turns out to be 23 and she and Kate get along great, until Will starts to date the daughter. Meanwhile, Andi thinks a male parent (Kyle Howard) at her child-rearing class is hitting on her, while the gang finds a sex video from Bobby and Andi's honeymoon.
7	"Cyrano de Trainer-Zac"	Shelley Jensen	Kate Angelo	May 19, 2014	1AWT08	5.13
Kate sleeps with Will's trainer, Zac (Hayes MacArthur), and later complains to the gang that the sex was awful. She breaks up with Zac via text, causing the mopey Zac to refuse to train Will. Will gives Zac some tips and begs Kate to give him one more chance. Following a night of great sex, Kate is horrified to learn that Will taught Zac all the moves he used. Bobby and Andi look for a nanny to reduce the amount of time that Andi's smothering mother is in the house watching Charlie. Elsewhere, Lowell pleads with Jules to wear his great-grandmother's awful-looking gown at their wedding.
8	"Something New"	Phill Lewis	Michael Markowitz & Justin Nowell	May 26, 2014	1AWT09	5.31
The gang attends the wedding of Kate's friend and former sorority sister, and Kate asks Will to pretend to be her boyfriend so she can tell her college friends she is dating a doctor. Kate soon meets a handsome single guy (Mark Feuerstein) at the reception and dumps Will, leaving him to deal with an older woman he had slept with while drunk only a few days before. Meanwhile, Lowell surprises Jules with a trip to India, but she gets mad because they are supposed to be saving money for their wedding. The two ponder whether or not they should get married, as they appear to think so differently. Andi's water breaks at the reception, and the gang joins her and Bobby at the hospital after Andi gives birth to the couple's daughter. Upon seeing the newborn, Lowell proclaims how much he still wants to marry Jules.
9	"Surprises"	Todd Holland	David Hemingson	September 30, 2014 (Amazon)	1AWT01	N/A
Concerned about their boring love life, Andi and Bobby try to spice things up. Meanwhile, Kate investigates Lowell's past relationships by pretending to be a US Census organization employee. It turns out that her mistrust of Lowell is misplace as both past relationships were broken off mutually. Will misinterprets signals from his ex, Val. They get back together briefly but break up again at the end of the episode.
10	"Deceivers"	Todd Holland	Stephanie Furman Darrow	September 30, 2014 (Amazon)	1AWT03	N/A
Will signs up for online dating and challenges Kate to see who can find a better mate. Andi goes to extremes to get Charlie into a posh preschool, and Jules fills in as Kate's assistant.
11	"No More Mr. Nice Guy"	Bob Koherr	Stephanie Furman Darrow & Kate VanDevender	September 30, 2014 (Amazon)	1AWT10	N/A
Out to prove she's not "un-setup-able," Kate persuades Lowell to fix her up with his friend. Andi decides to get more involved in the neighborhood, but Bobby's not on board with the idea.
12	"The Lost and Hound"	Phill Lewis	Daniel Spector & Jessica Polonsky	September 30, 2014 (Amazon)	1AWT11	N/A
A missing cheque could throw Andi and Bobby's marital scorecard out of balance. Jules and Lowell adopt way too many dogs, and Will is determined to coin a corny catchphrase.
13	"The Imposters"	Rob Schiller	Adam Chase & Nastaran Dibai	September 30, 2014 (Amazon)	1AWT12	N/A
Bobby's gift idea for Andi doesn't resonate with the friends, so Kate intervenes. Unaware that Val rented out their old house, Will makes an unannounced visit, only to get trapped inside.

== Reception ==
On Rotten Tomatoes, the series has an aggregate score of 13% based on 3 positive and 21 negative critic reviews. The website’s consensus reads: "With uninspired writing and a lack of chemistry between its leads, Friends With Better Lives is one you wouldn't wish on your worst enemy."
