= Strata (film) =

- Directed by: Geoff Steven
- Written by: Ester Krumbachová; Geoff Steven; Michael Havas
- Produced by: John Maynard
- Starring: Nigel Davenport; Judy Morris
- Cinematography: Leon Narbey
- Edited by: David Coulson
- Music by: Mike Nock
- Production company: Phase Three Film Productions
- Release date: 15 May 1983
- Running time: 110 min
- Country: New Zealand
- Language: English

Strata is a 1983 New Zealand film. It premiered at Cannes on 15 May 1983.

== Synopsis ==
Two groups wander the Volcanic Plateau. One is a team comprising a vulcanologist, a writer and a photographer, and the other is a group of five people who have escaped from quarantine.

== Cast ==
- Nigel Davenport as Victor
- John Banas as Steve
- Judy Morris as Margaret
- Patrick Smyth as Quarantine Doctor
- John Watson as Doctor
- Anne Walls as Receptionist
- Tom Brennan as Eric
- Roy Billing as Keith
- Peter Nicoll as Tony
- Mary Regan as Gaylene
- Ctibor Turba as Thomas
- Norman Forsey as Dr. Hunter
- Philip Holder as Orderly
- Phillip Gordon as Helicopter Pilot

== Reception ==
New Zealand film, 1912-1996 says "The characters represent ideas and are never credible as people." Rosemary Hemmings in Art New Zealand writes "Strata is pervaded with a sense of mystery; it more than ever is an essay in surrealism, in what might be called 'magic realism': and this is furthered by Krumbachova's propensity for using symbols to give the impression of things not being quite what they seem; and Stevens's concern as a director to use colours and locations 'not as overt symbols but as nuances'" Variety begins "Strata pays its audience the compliment of assuming that it does not have to use tricks or beguilement to claim total attention. The Oregonian's Ted Mahar notes "before the end, but a bogglingly ambiguous finale is not provocative but simply arbitrary. Various possibilities are quite obvious — and quite cliche. Perhaps Steven hoped to add meaning and mystery by subtracting plot resolution. He simply adds aggravation and dilutes what he'd already done.
