= Judy Morris =

Australian character actress (born 1947)

- Born: Judith Ann L'Armand; 17 February 1947 (age 79); Queensland, Australia
- Occupations: Actress; film director; screenwriter

Judith Ann Morris (born 17 February 1947) is an Australian character actress, as well as a film director and screenwriter, well known for the variety of roles she played in 58 different television shows and films, starting her career as a child actress and appearing on screen until 1999, since then she has worked on film writing and directing, most recently for co-writing and co-directing a musical epic about the life of penguins in Antarctica which became Happy Feet, Australia's largest animated film project to date.

== Early career ==
Morris's first role came at the age of 10 when she was part of the cast of the television episode "Picture of the Magi" a Family Theater production which aired about 1957 on the Mutual Broadcasting System in the United States. She then performed in two other roles in the US, at the age of 10 on the Loretta Young Show, and in 1960, at the age of 13, on The Chevy Mystery Show hosted on that occasion by Vincent Price.

== Career ==
Returning to Australia, Morris's next role was not to come until she reached the age of 20 when, in 1967, she worked on the ABC television series, Bellbird. Impressing casting agents, she was cast in numerous well known television series, including seven episodes of Division 4, four episodes of Matlock Police and three episodes of Homicide, Over There (24 episodes) and Certain Women (26 episodes).

In 1970, she starred in the portmanteau film 3 to Go. During this time she also moved to more provocative (for its time) television, especially in the sexually charged series Alvin Purple, and then under the direction of Tim Burstall as Sybil the babysitter in Libido: The Child (one of four parts of a portmanteau film that showed various aspects of human sexuality). In her role, Morris awakens the sexuality of the boy that she is babysitting. For her part, Morris won the 1973 Australian Film Industry (AFI) Best Actress in a Lead Role. Morris then played the part of Sam in the 1978 movie In Search of Anna, before receiving top billing as the wife Jill Cowper in the 1979 black comedy The Plumber, which began its life as a small 6 week television series directed by Peter Weir, but following its success was produced as a DVD titled The Mad Plumber.

The 1980s brought further success. She starred in Maybe This Time (1980), Strata (1983), Phar Lap (1983) as Bea Davis, the wife of Phar Lap's owner David J. Davis, and played the part of Catherine Faulkner, the mother of the main character, Kat Stanton, (played by Nicole Kidman) in Bangkok Hilton (1989). In 1986 Morris was cast as Margaret 'Meg' Stenning in the miniseries The Last Frontier, which also starred Jason Robards as her father Edward Stenning, fellow Australian Jack Thompson as her brother, the black sheep of the family, Nick Stenning, and American actress Linda Evans as Kate Adamson-Hannon. During and after this work she also played the role of Liz Beare, the daughter-in-law of Maggie Beare (played by Ruth Cracknell) in the series Mother and Son, which ran from 1984 to 1994. She also starred as an American photographer in Ozploitation film Razorback.

Following this, she was cast in the role of Mrs Muggleton in eight episodes of Spellbinder (1995), amongst other work.

In 1996, she voiced Melba the Crocodile for the animated TV show Crocadoo.

=== Writing and directing ===
Morris wrote and directed the comedy film Luigi's Ladies in 1989. She later teamed up with George Miller and Dick King-Smith to write Babe: Pig in the City in 1998.

She wrote an episode of Dinotopia in 2002, and then co-wrote Happy Feet (along with Warren Coleman, John Collee, and once again, George Miller). Happy Feet was the first Australian animated film to win the Academy Award for Best Animated Feature, and for her part in writing it, Morris was nominated for an Annie Award.

She later wrote the screenplay for Fred Schepisi's 2011 film, The Eye of the Storm, based on the novel of the same title.

== Awards ==
Year	Work	Award	Category	Result	Ref
1973	Libido: The Child.	Australian Film Institute Awards	Best Actress in a Lead Role	Won	
1977	The Picture Show Man	Australian Film Institute Awards	Best Actress in a Lead Role	Nominated	
1980	Maybe This Time	Australian Film Institute Awards	Best Actress in a Lead Role	Nominated	
1986	The More Things Change	Australian Film Institute Awards	Best Actress in a Lead Role	Nominated	
2007	Happy Feet	Annie Award	Best Writing in an Animated Production	Nominated	

== Filmography ==
=== Film ===
Year	Title	Role	Notes
1968	Nights Out	Lead role	Film short
1968	Juke Box	Lead role	Film short
1971	3 to Go	Judy	Segment: "Judy" Feature film
1972	The Final Comedown		Feature film (US)
1973	Libido	Sybil / Nanny	Feature film (Segment: The Child)
1973	Avengers of the Reef	Airline hostess	Feature film
1974	Between Wars	Deborah Trenbow	Feature film
1975	The Great Macarthy	Miss Russell	Feature film
1975	Scobie Malone (aka Murder at the Opera House)	Helga Brand	Feature film
1976	The Trespassers	Dee	Feature film
1977	The Picture Show Man	Miss Lockhart	Feature film
1978	In Search of Anna	Sam	Feature film
1980	...Maybe This Time	Fran	Feature film
1980	The Girl Who Met Simone de Beauvoir In Paris	Lead role	Film short
1982	Strata	Margaret	Feature film (NZ) (aka Checkmate)
1983	Phar Lap	Bea Davis	Feature film
1984	Razorback	Beth Winters	Feature film
1985	Niel Lynne (aka Best Enemies)	Patricia	Feature film
1985	The More Things Change	Connie	Feature film
1987	Going Sane	Ainslee Brown	Feature film
1987	Resuscitation (aka You've Probably Saved His Life)	Voice	Film short
1989	Luigi's Ladies	Director	Feature film
2008	Not Quite Hollywood: The Wild, Untold Story of Ozploitation!	Herself	Feature film documentary

=== Television ===
Year	Title	Role	Notes
1967	Bellbird		TV series, recurring role
1968	Rita and Wally		TV series, 1 episode
1969	Delta	Girl	TV series, 1 episode
1969	Australia, The Biggest Island in the World	Herself	Film documentary
1970	Stirring the Pool		TV movie
1970	Mrs. Finnegan	Receptionist	TV series, 1 episode
1970	Bachelor Gaye		TV series, regular role
1970	Barrier Reef	Gail Smith	TV series, 1 episode: "Sea Fever"
1970–1975	Division 4	Policewoman Kim Baker / Lynne Clark / Evie Morris / Helen Roche / Helen Ford / Judy Sutton / Liz Chandler / Sandra Morris (as Judith Morris)	TV series, 10 episodes
1970–1971, 1974	Homicide	Margaret Gillespie / Caroline Murray / Prue Fletcher	TV series, 3 episodes: "Wheels", "Thursday's Child", "The Last Season"
1971	The Comedy Game		TV series, 1 episode: "Arthur"
1971–1972; 1975	Matlock Police	Jenny Fisher / Bel Harris / Sheila Kelly / Jill Thompson	TV series, 4 episodes: "Early One Morning", "The Milk & Honey Man", "Cat & Mouse", "Baby Doll"
1971	Spyforce	Jill	TV series, 1 episode
1972	The Lady and the Law	Marion Hall	TV pilot
1972	The Spoiler	Fancy	TV series, 1 episode: "Catch as Catch Can"
1972; 1973	Boney	Kathy Markham / Jill Madden	TV series, 2 episodes: "Boney and the Claypan Mystery", "Boney and the Paroo Bikeman"
1972–1973	Over There	Elizabeth Kirby	TV series, 24 episodes
1973	Ryan	Jan Taylor	TV series, 1 episode: "The Little Piggy Went to Pieces"
1973–1974	Certain Women	Marjorie Faber	TV series, 26 episodes
1975	Cash and Company	Mary Fincham	TV series, 1 episode: "Dolly Mop"
1976	Luke's Kingdom	Ellen	TV miniseries, 1 episode: "The Land Lovers"
1976	Alvin Purple	Sophie	TV series, 1 episode: "O Death, Where Is Thy Sting?"
1976	Master of the World	Voice	TV movie
1976	The Outsiders	Karen	TV series, 1 episode: "Bad Dream Town"
1976	Mama's Gone A-Hunting	Tessa Goodman	TV movie
1977	The Dave Allen Show in Australia	Various character roles	TV series, 1 episode
1978	The Geeks	Lee	Teleplay
1978	Cass	Margo	TV movie
1978	Heidi		TV series, guest role
1979	Patrol Boat		TV series, 1 episode
1979	The Plumber	Jill Cowper	TV movie
1979	Tickled Pink		TV series, 1 episode
1979	Skyways	Robyn Davies	TV series, 12 episodes
1979	The First Christmas	Voice	TV short
1980	Ultraman 80	Aoyama Milly	TV series, 1 episode: "The Beautiful Transfer Student"
1981	Trial By Marriage	Mary	TV series, 1 episode
1982	Spring & Fall	Anne Lawrence	TV series, 1 episode: "Jimmy Dancer"
1984–1994	Mother and Son	Liz Beare	TV series, 18 episodes
1985	Make It Your Business	Herself	Video documentary
1985	Colour in the Creek	Ellen Fletcher	TV miniseries, 10 episodes
1985	Time's Raging	Lauren	TV movie
1986	The Last Frontier	Meg Stenning	TV miniseries, 2 episodes
1987	The Last of the Mohicans	Voice	TV movie
1988	The Dirtwater Dynasty	Frances Eastwick	TV miniseries, 5 episodes
1989	Bangkok Hilton	Catherine Faulkner	TV miniseries, 3 episodes
1991	Letters from Home	Voice	TV series
1991	Eggshells	Kathy Rose	TV series, 13 episodes
1992	The Other Side of Paradise	Miss Sowerby	TV miniseries, 4 episodes
1993	Crocadoo	Melba (voice)	Animated TV series, season 1
1994	Review	Guest presenter	TV series, 1 episode
1995	Spellbinder	Mrs. Muggleton	TV series, 9 episodes
1997	Heartbreak High	Fiona	TV series, 2 episodes: "6.37", "6.38"
1998	Twisted Tales	Veronica	TV film series, 1 episode: "The Test"
1998	Crocadoo II	Melba (voice)	Animated TV series, season 2
1999	Ballykissangel	Laurie Woskett	TV series, 1 episode: "Eureka"

=== Writing and directing ===
Year	Title	Role	Notes
1989	Luigi's Ladies	Writer, director	Feature film
1998	Babe: Pig in the City	Writer	Feature film
2002	Dinotopia	Writer	TV series, episode: "The Matriarch"
2006	Happy Feet	Writer, co-director, co-producer	Animated feature film
2008	Meerkat Manor	Writer	TV series
2009	Legend	Writer	
2010	Before the Rain	Writer	Feature film
2011	The Eye of the Storm	Writer	Feature film
2011	Happy Feet Two	Writer	Feature film
2012	1st AACTA Awards	Writer	TV special
2013	Adoration	Script editor	Feature film
2013	Goddess	Musical director	Feature film
2021	Chasing Wonders	Writer	Feature film
