= Crocadoo =

- Series 1 title screen
- Starring: Tony Barry; Simon Westaway (series 1); Dave Gibson; Judy Morris (series 1); Aaron Pedersen (series 1); Mary-Anne Fahey (series 1); David Cotter (series 2); Hugo Weaving (series 2); Joanne Moore (series 2)
- Composers: Nerida Tyson-Chew (series 1); Clive Harrison (series 2); Colin Timms (series 2)
- Country of origin: Australia
- Original language: English
- No. of series: 2
- No. of episodes: 52

Production
- Executive producers: Gerry Travers; John Travers
- Producers: Katie Cordes (series 1); Brenda Chat (series 2)
- Production locations: Artarmon, Australia
- Editors: Djordje Lukic; Danielle Akayan (series 2)
- Running time: 24 minutes
- Production company: Energee Entertainment

Original release
- Network: Nine Network
- Release: 31 May 1996 – 1998

Crocadoo is an Australian animated series produced by Energee Entertainment and the Nine Network from 1996 to 1998. It follows the adventures of a group of blue crocodiles trying to protect their riverbank from a mad developer. Crocadoo was Energee Entertainment's first original series, its first season being digitally colored and composited with Apple computers running Adobe, Linker Systems and COSA software. The first season's 3D backgrounds (Hotel, hotel interiors) were created using SGI Power Animator. Halfway through the first series, beginning with "Watch out for the Wonglebacks", some character animation was outsourced to Vietnam. Crocadoo's second season utilized Energee Entertainment's own CECAPS computer paint software.

Currently, the show is part of the Your Family Entertainment catalog and continues to air on their television networks worldwide.

== Characters ==
=== Main ===
- Jazz (voiced by Simon Westaway in series 1 and Hugo Weaving in series 2): A blue, skinny, male saltwater crocodile who is the leader of the crocodiles. He has all the plans and ideas to encourage all the other crocs to do whatever it takes to protect the riverbank. His Mum named him "Jeremy", but he changed that to something cooler.
- Brian (voiced by Dave Gibson): A purple, muscular, male croc who is Jazz's brother. He is usually hungry and lazy and easily gets confused, but is nice and friendly most of the time, unless if Jazz messes around with him.
- Rufus B. Hardacre (voiced by Tony Barry): The main antagonist of the show. A greedy hotel manager who hates crocodiles and plans to get rid of them to pave way for his new hotel development. He even hates his guests and only cares about his money.
- Ajax (voiced by Dave Gibson): A cockatoo who is Hardacre's sidekick despite the fact that they hate each other. He will tease and belittle Hardacre any way he can and is not afraid to fight back against his abuse.

=== Secondary ===
- Melba (voiced by Judy Morris in series 1 and Joanne Moore in series 2): A blue female croc who wears glasses, a red necklace, and an orange dress (pink top in series 2). She is the babysitter of the baby crocs and often tries to put all the other crocs on track (especially Jazz).
- Gina (voiced by Mary-Anne Fahey in series 1 and Joanne Moore in series 2): A blue, red haired, female croc that Brian has a crush on and often tries to get her attention until Season 2.
- Waldo (voiced by Simon Westaway in series 1 and Hugo Weaving in series 2): A big, fat, dark blue croc who loves to eat anything, especially if its not real food.
- Ol' Vern (voiced by Dave Gibson): The elder of the crocodiles. He is a storyteller and the keeper of Crocadoo's history.
- Kelly (voiced by Maryanne Fahey): A teenage girl genius who wears green glasses. She is the niece of Hardacre. Unlike her uncle, she is friends with the crocs and helps protect their home against him.
- Billy (voiced by Aaron Pedersen): An aboriginal teenage boy who works as a tour guide out in the riverbank showing tourists the Crocs. He is friends with all the crocodiles often helps them out alongside Kelly.

=== Other characters ===
- Big Boss: Hardacre's boss is in charge of a multinational company. He often orders Hardacre around and warns him that he'll be fired otherwise. His face is never revealed.
- Kevin: A little troublemaking boy who lives in Hardacre's Hotel and makes friends the crocs. He often calls Hardacre, "Mr. Hardbottom".
- Anna: A 20 ft tall fish who swam all the way from Sweden. Hardacre had put up an advertisement for a large fish to eat up crocs, but she only came for a hot love affair.
- Barrymundi: Small brown fish with a mustache who loves Anna and convinces her to marry him.
- Slim and Scanty: Two gangsters that have been hired by Hardacre to measure plans for his building resort. Slim is a short stubby man that hypnotizes Crocs with his big, ugly, and very strange eye. Scanty is a tall skinny woman who has doubts that Slim is a real gangsters, until Slim proves that he can do something powerful and harmful.
- Michelle: A hotheaded chef who had worked at a cafe called Tucker Box. She has a Swedish accent and puts on a Viking helmet when she's mad.
- Bloodnuts: A pair of two hooligans named Audrey and Hillis, they hunt crocodiles and then skin them for boots. Don't mess with them or else.
- Wrestling Alligator: He is a gigantic alligator, later revealed to be a muscular ant in disguise, who wrestles crocs.
- Bunyip; The Bunyip is a legendary monster who supposedly arrives in times of crisis to save the animals of Crocadoo. When Hardacre's illegal bulldozers wake the Bunyip from his slumber, he turns out to be a bit of a sook, and not much of a monster.
- Mr Downfall; The hotel inspector, Mr Downfall appears in the first and last shows of the second series. He gives Hardacre's new hotel half a star, a temporary license which will be revoked if the crocodiles are not happy when he returns.
- Midas Goldfoot: A million friend of the Big Boss who doesn't like wildlife but, loves gold.
- Basher and Crasher; Instead of Donner and Blitzen and Rudolph, Santa's reindeer are Basher and Crasher, who team up with the crocs to rescue Santa, who has been imprisoned and stripped of all the children's presents by Hardacre.
- Dr. Deloris Deadly: A dangerous woman Hardacre hired at the end of Season 1 to get rid of the crocs and as result she wrecked Crocadoo.
- Other Hardacres; Kelly is not the only relative of Hardacre's to appear in the show. While some such as Mad Uncle Scotty aid in his schemes, others oppose him including his nephew Percy and his frightening Mumsy.

== Episodes ==
=== Series 1 (1996) ===
1. The Noise Machine
2. Watch Out for the Wonglebacks!
3. Daycare Nightmare
4. The Club
5. Big Fish Blues
6. Almost a Ghost
7. Jobs for the Crocs
8. The Frame Up
9. Jailhouse Croc
10. Rumble in the Jungle
11. Frankencroc
12. The Tourist Trap
13. Gone Troppo
14. X Is for Explorers
15. The Big Dry
16. Urban Crocodile
17. Crocadoo Breakout
18. Slippery Dip
19. Making Movies
20. Red Eyed Rogue
21. Hiccups
22. Cane Toad Chaos
23. Mixed Up Love
24. Tyrannosaurus Wrecks
25. Croc Haven
26. Crocs in Peril

=== Series 2 (1998) ===
1. Friday the 13th
2. A Bunyip Story
3. Space Dog
4. Baby on Board
5. Trouble Ahead
6. Robocroc
7. I Scream of Genie
8. The Big Dig
9. Wipeout
10. Robbing Hood
11. Pick-a-Silly-Circus
12. Crocodile Magic
13. White Christmas
14. Tree Lurking Crocs
15. Easter Feast
16. Arty Party
17. Tiny Bit of Trouble
18. Croc Olympics
19. Pollution in Paradise
20. What's the Time, Mr. Croc?
21. Waldo the Wondercroc
22. Holiday Hazards
23. Lost Island
24. Venus Croctrap
25. Birthday Surprise
26. The Year of the Croc

== Computer game ==
- "Crocadoo Gone Troppo" is a Windows 95/98 and Macintosh game created by Dataworks Australia. You have to help Jazz and the other Crocs save their friend Brian from Hardacare, Ajax and the Mad Professor before they change his attitude in the Troppo Controller (a new invention made by the Mad Professor that controls everyone's attitude).

Along the way there are activities that involve solving, puzzling and creative skills.

The game was released in 1998 at the same time when series 2 was aired.

== See also ==
- List of Australian television series
