= Australia's Sexiest Tradie =

- Genre: Comedy
- Created by: Rick Donald
- Written by: Rick Donald
- Directed by: Rick Donald; Jason Perini
- Country of origin: Australia
- Original language: English
- No. of episodes: 6

Production
- Producers: Catherine Mack; Rick Donald
- Camera setup: single-camera
- Running time: 30 minutes
- Production company: OldBoy Productions

Original release
- Network: 7mate
- Release: 8 September 2021

Australia's Sexiest Tradie is a single-camera Australian mockumentary comedy television series on 7mate, created and written by Rick Donald, who also has the lead role. It is directed by Donald and Jason Perini and produced by Catherine Mack and Donald.

== Cast ==
- Rick Donald as Franky Wood
- Jason Perini as Grub
- Peter Phelps as Boss Man Wayne
- Steve Le Marquand as Terry Wood
- Pippa Grandison as Barbara Wood
- Briallen Clarke as Hammer
- Annabelle Stephenson as Summer
- Hugo Johnstone-Burt as Steve
- Catherine Mack as Rachel
- Callan Knight as Max
- Felix Williamson as Smacker
- Carla Bignasca as Bigsie
- Ella Bourne as El
- Fiona Gillman as Gilly

== Episodes ==
No.	Title	Directed by	Written by	Original release date
1	"Episode 1"	Rick Donald & Jason Perini	Rick Donald	9 September 2021
2	"Episode 2"	Rick Donald & Jason Perini	Rick Donald	8 September 2021
3	"Episode 3"	Unknown	Unknown	15 September 2021
4	"Episode 4"	Unknown	Unknown	22 September 2021
5	"Episode 5"	Unknown	Unknown	29 September 2021
6	"Episode 6"	Unknown	Unknown	6 October 2021
