= Tricky Business (Australian TV series) =

- Inter title Card
- Written by: Greg Haddrick
- Country of origin: Australia
- Original language: English
- No. of seasons: 1
- No. of episodes: 13

Production
- Executive producers: Des Monaghan; Greg Haddrick; Jo Rooney; Andy Ryan
- Production locations: Wollongong, Sydney
- Running time: 42 minutes
- Production companies: Screen Australia; Screentime

Original release
- Network: Nine Network
- Release: 14 May – 25 July 2012

Tricky Business is an Australian television drama series first broadcast on the Nine Network on 14 May 2012. Filmed in and around Wollongong and Sydney, the program is produced by Screentime with the assistance of Screen Australia. The Nine Network ordered 13 episodes. The series premiered in New Zealand on 4 September 2012 on TV3.

== Synopsis ==
This drama series focuses on a family that runs a debt collection business. Jim and Claire retired debt collectors leave their business in the hands of their eldest daughter Kate, who also runs the business with her partner Rick, her younger sister Lily and family friend Chad. Kate receives an out of the blue proposal from Rick, leaving her to say no, and soon be caught up in a new romance with rival debt collector Matt.

== Cast ==
=== Regular (including pilot episode) ===
Actor	Character
Gigi Edgley	Kate Christie
Antony Starr	Matt Sloane
Lincoln Lewis	Chad Henderson
Kip Gamblin	Rick Taylor
Sophie Hensser	Lily Christie
Odessa Young	Emma Christie
Debra Byrne	Claire Christie
Shane Bourne	Jim Christie

=== Recurring ===
Actor	Character
Rebecca Doyle	Brooke Goodman
Russell Kiefel	Hugh Goodman
Dena Kaplan	Minnesota Smith
Sandy Winton	Marcus Woodward
Hugo Johnstone-Burt	Alex Rudan

=== Guests ===
Actor	Character
Alexander England	Damien Wilson
Anna Lise Phillips	Lara Donnelly
Annie Maynard	Simone Woodward
Arka Das	Bank Teller
Brian Rooney	Hamish Kelly
Charlton Hill	Joe Davies
Craig Hall	George Blake
David Roberts	David Lang
Ed Oxenbould	Max Nugent
Jeff Truman	Car Dealer
Jessica De Gouw	Yvette Bell
Jessica Falkholt	Nurse
Josef Ber	Adrian Penn
Katrina Hobbs	Wendy James
Maya Stange	Frankie Chalmers
Matthew Dyktynski	Edward Nugent
Mercia Deane-Johns	Vera Stanic
Moya O'Sullivan	Lorraine Webb
Natalie Saleeba	Sonia Sloane
Nicholas Papademetriou	Tass Theophanous
Rebecca Massey	Gaye Hudson
Saskia Burmeister	Zoe Platt
Vince Martin	Ross Beechworth

== Ratings ==
The first episode of Tricky Business was due to air at 9:30pm on 14 May 2012, however, The Voice Australia ran over its time slot by 12 minutes. Michael Bodey from The Australian reported Tricky Business was tempered by The Voice's lead-in. It lost almost one million viewers in the first five minutes and averaged between 700–900,000 for the last half-hour of its broadcast. Overall, the episode pulled in an average of 1.16 million viewers.

Episode	Title	Original airdate	Viewers	Nightly Rank	Weekly Rank
1; 1-01	"Bad Debts in Wollongong"	14 May 2012	1.16m	7	26
2; 1-02	"Somebody That I Used To Know"	21 May 2012	0.94	12	50
3; 1-03	"Secrets and Lies"	28 May 2012	0.69	16	82
4; 1-04	"Facing The Music"	4 June 2012	0.76	15	70
5; 1-05	"Love Bites"	11 June 2012	1.09m	8	31
6; 1-06	"Opportunity Knocks"	17 June 2012	0.87	8	59
7; 1-07	"Mothercraft"	18 June 2012	1.36m	4	14
8; 1-08	"Secret Girls' Business"	25 June 2012	0.71	17	84
9; 1-09	"Space and Time"	2 July 2012	0.55	Below 20	153
10; 1-10	"Skyrockets in Flight"	11 July 2012	0.31	Below 20	NA
11; 1-11	"Who Wants To Be An Albatross"	18 July 2012	0.29	Below 20	NA
12; 1-12	"Bad Hair Day"	25 July 2012	0.31	Below 20	NA
13; 1-13	"Equilibrium"	25 July 2012	0.22	Below 20	NA

== Home media ==
On 26 July 2012, Ezy DVD Australia released information of Tricky Business. The DVD was released by Roadshow Entertainment on 16 August 2012, in a 3 disc set, with special features including;

- Shane Bourne : Introduces the Family
- Behind The Scenes

== See also ==
- List of Australian television series
