= Shai Alexander =

Australian actor

- Born: 17 January 1979 (age 46); Donetsk, Ukraine
- Occupation: actor
- Years active: 2009–present

Shai Alexander (17 January 1979 in Donetsk, Ukraine) is a Ukrainian-born Australian actor.

Shai currently resides in Sydney, New South Wales. He was trained in screen acting at the National Institute of Dramatic Art.

== Education ==
In 2002 Shai Alexander graduated from the University of Amsterdam in the Netherlands.

In 2010 he graduated from the National Institute of Dramatic Art (NIDA) studying at Screen Acting.

In 2013 Alexander started studying at the Screen Academy of the Russian Director and Actor Nikita Mikhalkov (Academy Award winner) in Moscow, Russia.

== Filmography ==
- 2012 – Socio ... as Businessman
- 2011 – Newton's 3rd Law ... Sabir Ali
- 2011 – Little Thief ... Vasse
- 2010 – What If ... Alex Romero
- 2010 – Take, Me, There ... Jack
- 2010 – Before the Rain ... Danny
- 2009 – Nicky Two-Tone ... Danny
