= Rehearsal (film) =

- Directed by: Carl Bessai
- Produced by: Jack Heston, Will Clevinger, Andrew Alter
- Starring: Bruce Greenwood; Deborah Kara Unger; Rob Morrow; Dean Geyer; David Cubitt; Rhian Rees
- Cinematography: Colt Seman
- Edited by: Sabrina Pitre
- Production company: Raven West Films
- Release date: December 4, 2015 (Whistler Film Festival)
- Running time: 95 minutes
- Countries: United States; Canada; United Kingdom
- Language: English

Rehearsal is a 2015 film directed by Carl Bessai, starring Bruce Greenwood and Deborah Kara Unger.

The film was shot "in a lovely old theatre in downtown Los Angeles" though set in London.

The film had its world premiere at the Whistler Film Festival as part of a tribute to Greenwood, who received a career achievement award.
