= Before the Rain (2010 film) =

- Directed by: Nick Clifford; Craig Boreham; Stephen de Villiers; CJ Johnson
- Written by: Shirley Barrett; Judy Morris; Christopher Lee; Alice Bell
- Produced by: Sandra Levy; Graham Thorburn
- Starring: Shai Alexander; Jacinta Acevski; Ryan Corr; Kimberley Hews
- Cinematography: Joel Froome; Adam Howden
- Edited by: Adrian Chiarella; Amarnath Jones; Gwen Sputore
- Music by: David Barber; Paul Kopetko
- Release date: 28 May 2010 (Australia)
- Running time: 90 minutes
- Country: Australia
- Language: English

Before the Rain is a 2010 Australian drama film. The film is an anthology of four short films taking place on a hot day in Sydney just before a rainstorm.

Each of the four stories was written by a different screenwriter, and directed by a different filmmaker. The directors were Craig Boreham, Nick Clifford, Stephen de Villiers and CJ Johnson, and the writers were Shirley Barrett, Judy Morris, Christopher Lee and Alice Bell.

== Cast ==
- Jacinta Acevski ... Nicole
- Shai Alexander ... Danny
- Cooper George Amai ... Hugh
- Laurence Brewer ... Harley
- Ryan Corr ... Max
- Kenji Fitzgerald ... Jamie
- Lisa Gormley ... Karin
- Kimberley Hews ... Naomi
