= Willow Harris =

- Home and Away character
- Portrayed by: Sarah Roberts
- Duration: 2017–2021
- First appearance: 14 November 2017
- Last appearance: 14 April 2021
- Introduced by: Lucy Addario
In-universe information
- Occupation: Personal trainer
- Father: Russell Harris
- Mother: Alice Lawson
- Grandmothers: Judy Lawson
- Uncles: Bobby Harris

Willow Harris (also Ranger) is a fictional character from the Australian television soap opera Home and Away, played by Sarah Roberts. The character made her first screen appearance on 14 November 2017. Roberts had auditioned for the roles of both Kat Chapman and Scarlett Snow prior to playing Willow. She auditioned successfully and attended screen testing with James Stewart who play's Willow's love interest Justin Morgan. Willow was originally going to be named Amber. She is characterised as a tough female who was raised in a broken home and has subsequently learned to look after herself. Roberts has said that she admires the character's strong personality. Willow is introduced into the show wearing leather, chains and riding a motorbike. This added to her image as a powerful female character.

Writers quickly paired her with Justin and their relationship is marred by a feud with gang member Boyd Easton (Steve Le Marquand). His family kidnap Justin's daughter Ava Gilbert (Grace Thomas), which ends the relationship. Producers introduced Willow's ex-boyfriend Dean Thompson (Patrick O'Connor) and the characters resume their relationship. A gambling addiction story was written for Willow and she ends up stealing, loaning money, scamming people and squatting. Roberts found the gambling story challenging and carried out extensive research to accurately portray the issue. The character has been well received by critics of the genre who analysed her strong personality and dramatic introduction into the series. In March 2021, Roberts confirmed that she had left Home and Away and her final appearance aired on 14 April 2021.

== Casting ==
Prior to securing the role of Willow, actress Sarah Roberts auditioned for both Kat Chapman and Scarlett Snow. Roberts recorded her first audition for the part while residing in Los Angeles. She flew up from Melbourne to Sydney for the on-set audition and had a chemistry reading with James Stewart, who plays Justin Morgan. Roberts did not think she had won the part, as it took a while for the producers to contact her. The character was originally supposed to be named Amber but this was later changed to Willow. Roberts remembered her first day playing Willow as "awesome", recalling dressing in leather, chains and transforming into character. Willow made her first on screen appearance during the episode broadcast on 14 November 2017.

== Development ==
=== Characterisation ===
Filled with energy and fun, the attractive, fit and dynamic Willow Harris is a delight – but cross her and it's like having a firecracker go off in your face. Raised a single child in a broken home to a rough 'n' tumble dad, she learnt to look out for number one early.

— An excerpt taken from The official Home and Away website.

Willow is characterised as "a tough, dynamic and powerful" female and is surrounded by mostly male characters. Roberts made sure she was strong on set to "do justice to her character" in the male dominated scenes. She was raised by her father, a single parent, which made Willow learn how to look after herself early in life. Roberts has described Willow as a "strong female character", who is also independent, loyal and fierce. The actress said Willow would bring "mischief and a bit of trouble" to Summer Bay. Willow's introduction into Home and Away showcased her characteristion. Roberts said that Willow proves herself to be "a tough cookie – she's a total firecracker", as she rides into Summer Bay on a motorbike. She immediately makes herself known to Justin and accuses him of stealing $15,000. Roberts said that Willow validates her tough persona in the scenes where she attacks Justin, ties him up and locks him in his garage overnight. Roberts told Tamara Cullen from TV Week that Willow "rode into town with a lot of power, she's definitely going to cause some mischief!"

Roberts told a journalist from New Idea that Willow was "definitely a bad girl. But for all the right reasons. She has taken wrong turns and made decisions that some people would consider 'bad', but only to help the people that she loves." In another interview the actress described Willow as "very sassy and fun. She's got attitude. I think she's a woman who knows what she wants and won't stop until she gets it, but is also fiercely loyal and will do anything for the people she loves." Roberts liked her character's "really strong" and "feisty" side and believed the character would stop at nothing to get what she wants. Willow had a difficult life and upbringing, as a result she "put a guard up" not allowing others to emotionally connect with her. Willow has a "tougher" wardrobe than that of a traditional feminine one. This helped Roberts to get into character, with her explaining that "I put on her costume and totally feel like her."

=== Relationship with Justin Morgan ===
Willow was introduced into the show as a new love interest for Justin Morgan. Her first story follows her getting into trouble with Boyd Easton (Steve Le Marquand) because she owes him money. He attacks Willow's father and pushes him down stairs. He then vandalises Justin's garage to serve as a warning to help Willow return the missing money. Justin tries to reason with Boyd and his biker gang but the meeting turns violent, leaving Justin bruised. He reports the incident to the police which gets Boyd arrested. Ash (George Mason) tries warn Justin to stay away from Willow, he fear for her safety and convinces Willow to move into the local caravan park. Claire Crick from Soaplife reported that Justin quickly assumes the role of Willow's "knight in shining armour". She added that despite Willow causing trouble for Justin, he cannot stop thinking about her. Stewart told Sarah Ellis from Inside Soap that "Justin is becoming quite protective of Willow" and his character "is thrilled" when he gets to spend time with her. Roberts and Stewart soon began a relationship off screen. Roberts believed their own romance made playing an on screen couple easy. She told Fiona Byrne from the Herald Sun that "i did not even have to create any chemistry when I was on screen with Jimmy, it was all just there, it was not a job."

On screen their relationship burgeons when Justin helps Willow secure employment in Summer Bay. Willow competes against Mason Morgan (Orpheus Pledger) for a job at the gym. The gym's manager John Palmer (Shane Withington) asks Justin to make the decision about hiring staff. They equally impress him and both receive a job. Willow thanks Justin for his help and they soon end up having sex in her caravan. Their romance has a tumultuous start after Justin asks if their sexual encounter means they are in a relationship. Willow states that she wants a casual arrangement and throws him out. In later episodes the pair resume their romance. Justin's sister Tori Morgan (Penny McNamee) soon disapproves of Willow and tells her that Justin is unhappy with a casual relationship. The pair clash and Willow is put off by Justin's over protective family. Producers soon introduced Willow's ex-boyfriend and old friend, Dean Thompson (Patrick O'Connor) into the show. Dean is a member of the show's fictional criminal gang The River Boys, which Willow also has connections with. Initially Justin does not realise that Willow used to be romantically involved with Dean.

Writers continued to create trouble between the couple. She was unaware Justin has a daughter, Ava Gilbert (Grace Thomas). When she comes to stay it shocks Willow, but she and Ava get on well. Justin does not let Willow stay over to avoid upsetting Ava. A Home and Away publicist told Soaplife's Crick that Justin is later forced to trust Willow and leave Ava in her care. But when Willow allows Ava to cook dinner, Justin is outraged at the sight of his daughter handling knives and boiling water. He argues with Willow and their relationship is left "fledging". The story takes a sinister turn when Ava is kidnapped by Hazel Easton (Genevieve Lemon), who is Boyd's mother. They demand ransom money for Ava's safe return. The publicist told Crick that Willow blames herself because she caused their involvement in Boyd's vendetta. Willow cooperates with Boyd, hands over the cash and Ava is returned home safe. But a local police officer, Colby Thorne (Tim Franklin) shoots and kills Boyd. Ava's mother Nina Gilbert (Zoe Naylor) warns Willow that Justin cannot have access to Ava if he remains involved with her. Willow breaks-up with Justin and gets back with her ex-boyfriend Dean. Justin is confused and starts a fight with Dean. Roberts told a reporter from Inside Soap that her character is "devastated" about her break-up with Justin, but does not want him to lose Ava. She gets with Dean to ensure that Justin moves on. Dean pursues a relationship with Willow and Roberts believed Dean talked her character into it. She assessed "I think Willow is better suited to Justin though. She came to Summer Bay to straighten her life out, and Justin was a perfect match for that reason."

=== Gambling addiction ===
"Justin has past experience with addicts [...] but Willow's going to be a tough nut to crack when she doesn't even want to help herself."

— A Home and Away publicist on Willow's addiction (2018)

Writers planned a gambling addiction storyline for the character. Roberts found it challenging to portray because she had not experienced gambling addiction before. She carried out extensive research into the issue and spoke to gambling addicts to gain an insight into their lives. Roberts said that she used the new found knowledge to deliver a better story on screen. Willow's gambling problems began following her break-up with Justin. When Willow starts a relationship with Dean he loses his job at the garage. Willow struggles to pay both her and Dean's rent at the caravan park. Willow steals money from the till at the gym and her friend Jasmine Delaney (Sam Frost) catches her. Jasmine takes pity on Willow and gives her a loan. But when Alf Stewart (Ray Meagher) asks for more rent, Willow becomes desperate and gambles away her remaining funds. She then sells gym equipment to pay Jasmine back, which also leads to a confrontation with Jasmine. Roberts told a reporter from TV Week that Willow's gambling addiction is out of control. She explained that her character "feels guilty and shameful, and is acting out in weird ways." Willow down plays her addiction but Dean refuses to accept her lies. Roberts said that "Dean knows her so well and can usually help her when things go wrong, but this time, it seems she's in too deep."

Jasmine later learns that Willow has been gambling and tells her that she needs help to treat her addiction. Willow does not take kindly to Jasmine's interfering and slaps her across the face. Roberts said that Willow "immediately goes on the defensive" around Jasmine. She added that her character instantly regrets slapping Jasmine because she "knows she's gone too far." The actress was nervous about filming the slap scene. A stunt coordinator taught Roberts and Frost how to make a fake slap without contact look authentic. Writers continued to make Willow down on her luck when she tells John the truth about her thefts from the gym. He is upset with her and fires her from her job. Willow is once again left without any money to pay her rent. Willow and Dean begin squatting in Colby's apartment and he borrows money from a loan shark but cannot pay it back. They decide to skim credit cards and tamper with the card machine inside the local restaurant Salt. When they exit the building, they knock Alf to the ground and leave him unconscious. Irene Roberts (Lynne McGranger) becomes their first victim of card skimming when money disappears from her account. The actress told Ellis (Inside Soap) that Willow does not want to steal from "decent people", but feels that she has no choice. She also defended her character over Alf and Irene's misfortune, revealing Willow "feels terrible" and "never meant to hurt anyone."

Writers planned a break-up for Willow and Dean following her continuous problems. Dean confides in Justin about Willow's gambling and requests that he look after her. He then breaks-up with her leaving Justin free to help her. A Home and Away publicist revealed that Dean "reluctantly" ends the relationship and "knows that Justin is the only person she will listen to." Justin struggles to help Willow overcome her addiction. She lashes out at Justin and blames him for her addiction, but Tori tells her that she ruined her own life. Roberts did not believe that Willow and Dean's relationship was good for her character. She branded it a "whirlwind relationship" that created a "worrying future". Despite this she noted that Home and Away viewers "love" the duo's "history and unyielding friendship".

=== Departure ===
During a feature on her relationship with Stewart, Roberts told Amy Price of The Courier-Mail that she had left Home and Away and was auditioning for new roles. She later said leaving the show happened "at a good time" for her, explaining "I can now reflect on myself within and outside of work. It'll be nice to work on myself for a bit. I need to step back, relax and breathe. I want to meditate, have family time, work out and enjoy life." She also called her time in Home and Away "a dream come true". In the lead up to Willow's exit, she helps put Colby in prison and then temporarily leaves the Bay. Willow later decides to go to Queensland seeking a reconciliation with Alex Neilson (Zoe Ventoura). Roberts thought her character's departure was "a lovely way to leave the show". Her final scenes aired on 14 April 2021.

== Reception ==
Willow's tough persona and dramatic entrance into the series have drawn critical analysis. Ali Cromarty from New Idea said "If you saw Willow roll into Summer Bay last week, you'd be right to feel a little scared. The new Home And Away recruit is all leather and motorbikes while rocking a 'don't mess with me' attitude." Tamara Cullen from TV Week branded her the "sexy, leather-clad Willow" and a "tough girl" who "made quite the impression on Justin." Another writer from TV Week branded Willow a "bikie babe". A writer for TVNZ said "Justin and Willow’s chemistry on-screen was obvious from the start." Kerry Harvey from Stuff.co.nz branded her "the feisty Willow" and a reporter from the New Zealand radio station The Hits, similarly branded her the "feisty biker girl Willow". Claire Crick from Soaplife opined that "Willow creates trouble wherever she goes" and "Willow isn't a stranger to danger and drama." Regarding Willow and Justin, she later questioned that "surely this is one couple that's doomed from the start?" Following her gambling addiction drama Crick said that "her life's spiraling out of control" and "crumbling around her". Inside Soap's Ellis said "watch out fellas... there's a feisty new chick riding into Summer Bay this week and she plans on taking no prisoners." The editor of TV Soap magazine, Vesna Petropoulos branded Willow and Justin the "Summer Bay sweethearts". In the 2018 Digital Spy Reader Awards, Willow and Justin were nominated for "Best Soap Couple"; they came in last place with 1% of the total votes.
