= List of Home and Away characters introduced in 2018 =

Home and Away is an Australian television soap opera. It was first broadcast on the Seven Network on 17 January 1988. The following is a list of characters that appeared in 2018, by order of first appearance. All characters are introduced by the soap's executive producer, Lucy Addario. The 31st season of Home and Away began airing from 29 January 2018. Dean Thompson and Colby Thorne were introduced during February. April saw the first appearances of Lance Salisbury and Ebony Harding, while Ty Anderson made his debut in May. September saw the arrival of Chelsea Campbell. Dean's mother Karen Thompson was introduced in October. Simone Bedford and Bella Nixon began appearing from November.

== Dean Thompson ==
Dean Thompson, played by Patrick O'Connor, made his first appearance on 1 February 2018. O'Connor began filming five months prior to his casting announcement on 13 January 2018. He had previously auditioned for other Home and Away characters, and came close to securing the roles, before being cast as Dean. This is O'Connor's first acting role. Of his casting, he stated "Home and Away is obviously known as a launch pad for many actors’ careers. Obviously going into the type of role that this is, being a River Boy and there being a story there already that is so big and well known, it means there is a legacy there to play around with and being a bad boy on the show is exciting." Dean is a member of the show's River Boys group, who were introduced in 2011 with the arrival of the Braxton brothers. Dean was branded "the new bad boy of Summer Bay" by Jonathon Moran of The Daily Telegraph. While O'Connor described him as "cheeky" and said that he loves AFL. The actor added that he likes that his character has tattoos, as he has always wanted one.

== Colby Thorne ==
Colby Thorne, played by Tim Franklin, made his first appearance on 6 February 2018. Franklin's casting was confirmed in December 2017, after he was photographed filming scenes at Palm Beach, the show's outdoor filming location. He learned from his agent that he had secured the role of Colby on his 27th birthday. He stated, "My agent sang 'Happy Birthday', but changed my name to Colby. When I heard it, I jumped out of my seat and screamed – it was the best gift." Colby is a police constable. Franklin said Colby's "turbulent upbringing" led him to join the force. He also told Tamara Cullen of TV Week, "I believe that any character has to come from a reality within myself. We've both had traumas and heartache in our past – as we all have – so I try to bring as much of myself to the role." Colby is a former member of the River Boys surf gang, and a love interest for Jasmine Delaney (Sam Frost).

== Lance Salisbury ==
Lance Salisbury
- Home and Away character
- Portrayed by: Angus McLaren
- Duration: 2018–2019
- First appearance: 17 April 2018
- Last appearance: 8 August 2019
- Introduced by: Lucy Addario
In-universe information
- Occupation: Federal agent
- Father: Terence Salisbury

Lance Salisbury, played by Angus McLaren, made his first appearance on 17 April 2018. McLaren's casting and character details were announced on 16 April 2018. Of joining the cast, McLaren commented, "It's very exciting. It hit home for me when I walked into the Diner and all the characters I've grown up watching were there." McLaren was reunited with his former Packed to the Rafters co-star James Stewart, who plays Justin Morgan. Lance is a federal agent and best friend of Robbo (Jake Ryan). Lance is involved with the circumstances surrounding Robbo's amnesia and he helps out as the "mystery slowly gets unpacked." Lance also wants his friend to get justice. The character returned the following year.

After Robbo is brought in to an AFP base, Lance helps him to recall his memories and identity. Lance explains that Robbo's real name is Ryan Shaw and that he is a federal agent, whose family were killed when he began investigating corruption in the force. Robbo went undercover as Beckett Reid and he was sent to Summer Bay to protect Kat Chapman (Pia Miller). The federal police were unsure whether Robbo's amnesia was real or not, so they did not intervene. Lance drives Robbo back to Summer Bay and tells him that all the charges against him have been dropped. He also returns all of Robbo's belongings, including his birth certificate, passport, driver's licence and credit cards. Lance advises Robbo to think about returning to the AFP before he leaves. Robbo calls Lance, but he remains reluctant to accept his offer to rejoin. Lance and Robbo team up to investigate a smuggling operation, but Robbo has to retrain and Lance informs him that he needs to pass a psych evaluation. Robbo refuses and Lance suggests that he becomes an instructor instead, but Robbo soon realises that he no longer wants to do police work. Robbo later contacts Lance to ask him to run a background check on Ebony Harding (Cariba Heine).

Lance returns to the Bay for Robbo's pre-wedding dinner at Salt, after being invited by Colby Thorne (Tim Franklin). He meets Robbo's fiancée Jasmine Delaney (Sam Frost) and he and Robbo both notice that something is bothering her. On the day of the wedding, Lance receives a call and later tells Robbo that his parents will not make the ceremony due to car trouble. Lance continues to check his phone and later asks Colby Thorne to identify a guest outside the church. After allowing Robbo and Jasmine to enjoy a moment of their wedding reception, Lance and other AFP officers move in to take the couple into protective custody. They, along with Tori Morgan who is carrying Robbo's child, are taken to a safe house, where Lance explains that the people who killed Robbo's family are back. Robbo and Jasmine decide to return to the Bay, and Lance deputises Robbo back into the AFP. Lance stays with Tori at the safe house, until he decides to go back into the field. He assures her that Scott Larkin (Trent Baines) is trustworthy, and that he will do his best to get her home to her family. Lance is later murdered by Ouroboros Gang as a message to Robbo to stop him from testifying

== Ebony Harding ==
Ebony Harding
- Home and Away character
- Portrayed by: Cariba Heine
- First appearance: 19 April 2018
- Last appearance: 30 July 2018
- Introduced by: Lucy Addario
In-universe information
- Other names: Ebony Easton; Lisa Harding
- Occupation: Bartender
- Mother: Hazel Easton
- Brothers: Boyd Easton

Ebony Harding (also Easton), played by Cariba Heine, made her first appearance on 19 April 2018. The character and Heine's casting was confirmed during a trailer which aired before the show's break for the 2018 Commonwealth Games. Heine sent a taped audition to the casting directors while she was overseas. Weeks later, she learnt via email that she had secured the role of Ebony. Ebony was introduced as the show's new villain, who wants revenge on some of the residents of Summer Bay. She is connected with the kidnapping of Justin Morgan's (James Stewart) daughter Ava Gilbert (Grace Thomas). Eliza Velk of Yahoo7 Be speculated that Ebony also has a connection to criminal Boyd Easton (Steve Le Marquand) and commented, "Either way something bad is brewing in the bay." Heine later said that she was excited to play a villain, adding "She's pretty despicable, so I hope she gets a rise out of people!"

Ebony goes to Northern Districts Hospital and pretends to be a doctor, after learning her brother Boyd Easton has been brought in. After overhearing that her brother has died, she goes to see her mother, Hazel Easton (Genevieve Lemon), and they both swear revenge on the people who are responsible for Boyd's death. Ebony comes to Summer Bay and begins trying to get to know Colby Thorne (Tim Franklin), the police constable who shot Boyd. She slashes her car tyre, hoping Colby will help her change it, but he has to leave and Hunter King (Scott Lee) helps out. Hazel tells her to hurry up and make everyone pay, but Ebony replies that she wants to have some fun and plans to go after Willow Harris (Sarah Roberts) and Justin Morgan too. Hazel continues to doubt Ebony's plan. Ebony brings her car to Justin's business Summer Bay Auto for a service, and later stages a car crash, hoping to discredit the garage. Ebony threatens to sue Justin for $100,000 for her neck injury and loss of potential earnings. Justin offers her a $30,000 settlement, which she accepts. He also gets her a job at his brother's restaurant, Salt. Ebony breaks into Colby's apartment and learns he has a younger sister. She continues to bond with Colby, before sabotaging his relationship with Jasmine Delaney (Sam Frost).

Ebony learns Colby was a member of the River Boys gang and leaks the story to the newspapers. She also takes a photo of Colby with fellow River Boy Dean Thompson (Patick O'Connor), which results in Colby's suspension from the police force. Ebony starts manipulating Colby's friendship with his housemate Robbo (Jake Ryan) by suggesting that Robbo might be trying to set Colby up. Ebony flirts with Robbo and tries to question him about Colby, before kissing him. Robbo makes it clear that he is interested in Ebony romantically and she accepts his invitation to a lunch date. Hazel moves into Ebony's motel room and gives her two vials of poison. Hazel tells Ebony to kill Robbo, as well as Colby. Ebony poisons Robbo's drink during lunch, but when he opens up about the death of his partner, she takes his glass and pours the drink away, unable to go through with killing him. Ebony sees Colby fighting with Dean and calls the police, leading them to fire Colby from his job.

Ebony plants her burner phone in Willow's caravan and when Colby finds Willow and Dean with the phone, their relationship is strained. Ebony realises that Robbo is becoming suspicious of her, and she later learns he is having her investigated. Ebony steals medication from the hospital and then knocks Colby out. When he wakes, Ebony explains who she is and then injects him with a muscle relaxant, which will soon stop him breathing. Ebony calls the police and sends them to her motel room by pretending she is a concerned guest. When they arrive, they find Robbo with Hazel's body. Ebony leaves the Bay, believing she has killed Colby and framed Robbo. Robbo is charged with Hazel's murder, while Colby is found in time. After he returns home, Ebony contacts him via an online chat room and pretends to be his sister. She lures Colby to a house in the bush, where she locks him inside a room and pours gasoline around the door. Robbo tries to talk her out of setting it alight, but she refuses and drops it, but Robbo manages to catch her lighter. Ebony runs outside, attempting to escape, but the police arrive and arrest her.

== Ty Anderson ==
Ty Anderson
- Home and Away character
- Portrayed by: Darius Williams
- First appearance: 7 May 2018
- Last appearance: 15 August 2018
- Introduced by: Lucy Addario
In-universe information
- Occupation: Student
- Mother: Jodi Anderson
- Grandfathers: Sam
- Grandmothers: Doreen

Ty Anderson, played by Darius Williams, made his first appearance on 7 May 2018. The character and casting details were announced in the 21–27 April 2018 issue of Inside Soap. Williams was contracted for six months. He began filming his guest stint from October 2017. Actor Ray Meagher (Alf Stewart) confirmed that the producers would be introducing a gay character during a February 2018 interview. He stated, "Our writers do try to keep abreast with the times, so there is an interesting character coming in. I won't tell you too much more about him, about how he works out or what happens, but that is being addressed." Ty is the first gay character to be introduced to Home and Away since 2009, when the show featured a same-sex relationship between Charlie Buckton (Esther Anderson) and Joey Collins (Kate Bell), which was criticised by conservative groups and parents. Ty is fostered by John Palmer (Shane Withington) and Marilyn Chambers (Emily Symons). He also befriends Raffy Morrison (Olivia Deeble) during his time in Summer Bay. Following his character's departure on 15 August 2018, Williams wrote on his social media account, "I hope Ty's complex, contemporary and powerful story is one remembered fondly. Thank you everyone who watched and enjoyed." Williams said he would like to return, as there were many storylines to explore with Ty.

After his grandfather gets sick, Ty's case worker brings him to Summer Bay to stay with John Palmer and Marilyn Chambers. Ty refuses the food on offer, as he has already eaten, and later goes out on his own for a walk. Ty appears disinterested during a talk about his new school, leading Raffy Morrison to call him out for being rude to everyone. When Ty tells her that he does not plan on staying long and will be gone when he turns sixteen, Raffy tells him to leave. Ty befriends Ryder Jackson (Lukas Radovich) when they pair up for an assignment during Ty's first day at school. Raffy accuses Ty of taking advantage of John and Marilyn, while he counters that she is jealous of not being the focus of all their attention. When Raffy sees Ty throwing away the packed lunch Marilyn prepared for him, she confronts him again about his ungrateful attitude towards the Palmers. Ty tells her that they will never love her like their own child and Raffy slaps him. Roo Stewart (Georgie Parker) ask them to apologise to each other, but they refuse and Ty walks out of the office. Raffy later finds him on the beach and apologises for slapping him. She asks him if they can have a fresh start and they finally bond, with Ty vowing to make more of an effort with the Palmers.

Ty stands up for Raffy when another student purposely bumps her, making her drop her money. They continue to get on well, until she asks to listen to his music and they argue again. Ty later decides to share his music with her. While Raffy is listening to one of his newer tracks, Ty kisses her and she kisses him back. John and Raffy's brother Justin Morgan (James Stewart) walk in on them and Justin orders Raffy to move home. Ty apologises to John and Marilyn for jeopardising their chance at fostering. Ty later meets Raffy at the beach and they kiss again. They start dating. Ty's friendship with Ryder grows when he helps Ryder out at the juice bar. While helping Coco Astoni (Anna Cocquerel) to plan her sister's wedding, Ty invites Ryder to listen to his latest song. Ty then tells Ryder that he likes him, before attempting to kiss him. Ryder asks Ty to meet him the following day to talk. Ty initially says that he mistook Ryder for Raffy, as he was tired. Ryder tells him it is okay if he is gay, but Ty reacts angrily and physically pushes Ryder away several times. Ty refuses to speak to John, and later takes all his belongings and leaves. Ty falls down an embankment in the bush, and injures his head and ankle. He manages to call Ryder, who sends John and Alf Stewart to help rescue him. In the hospital, Ty admits to John and Marilyn that he is gay, and asks them to talk to Raffy, who reacts angrily when she believes Ty was just using her.

Ty attempts to make amends with Raffy, but she plans to move back in with her family. Raffy later tells Ty that he made her feel like the problem in their relationship. Ty apologises, and explains that he was confused and realises he should not have strung her along. Raffy is teased about her break-up with Ty by another student at school, which leads Ty to out himself in her defence. He then suffers a panic attack, and tells John and Marilyn that he does not want to return to school. Coco, Raffy and Ryder decide that they will stay with Ty if he is not going back to school, but when they are threatened with detention, Coco suggests they all go in together. Ty notices the other students talking about him, so Ryder takes Ty into the school office and plays one of Ty's songs over the PA system. The other students enjoy the music and give him a round of applause when he emerges. Ty celebrates his 16th birthday and his mother Jodi Anderson (Sara Zwangobani) asks to see him, but Ty decides that he does not want to meet her, as he is worried that she will not accept him. Jodi comes to the Bay and Marilyn encourages Ty to give his mum a chance. Jodi explains to Ty that his grandparents kept her away from him, and she should have tried harder to see him. After telling Jodi about his sexuality, Ty decides to leave the Bay with her.

== Chelsea Campbell ==
Chelsea Campbell
- Home and Away character
- Portrayed by: Ashleigh Brewer
- Duration: 2018–2019
- First appearance: 18 September 2018
- Last appearance: 28 February 2019
- Introduced by: Lucy Addario
In-universe information
- Occupation: Senior Constable
- Father: Neil Campbell
- Sisters: Alison
- Husband: Colby Thorne (2018–2020)

Chelsea Campbell, played by Ashleigh Brewer, made her first appearance on 18 September 2018. Brewer's casting and character details were announced on 31 March 2018. Brewer was in Los Angeles when she learned about the role, and she filmed an audition to send over to the Home and Away producers. After recording a second tape and sending it over, she learned that she had secured the role. The actress was initially contracted for six months. Of joining the show, Brewer stated "I'm so excited about it. The character in particular is great and the storyline is fantastic. I'm very excited to dive into a show that is so long-standing and one that I know very well." Brewer declined the producers' offer to extend her contract, as she had plans to move into a new home with her boyfriend in Los Angeles.

Chelsea is a police senior constable, who has a connection to one of the established characters. Brewer commented that Chelsea would give the character "a real shock..." She also called her character "extremely nice with a strong head on her shoulders", but added that Chelsea would cause some trouble. A writer for TV Soap dubbed Chelsea a "sassy cop", and thought Brewer's casting was "a terrific shot in the arm for Home and Away."

Chelsea is shown around the Summer Bay Caravan Park by Alf Stewart (Ray Meagher). She attracts the attention of Dean Thompson (Patrick O'Connor), who makes romantic advances towards her, but she rejects him. Chelsea comes face to face with her former boyfriend Colby Thorne at the Yabbie Creek Police Station and she informs him that she has been transferred, but Colby refuses to talk with her. Chelsea later arrests Dean for refusing to leave a property. She and Colby talk about their break up due to his affiliation with the River Boys gang. Chelsea asks him if he still loves her, and gives him her engagement ring, but Colby asks her to leave the Bay. They later kiss, but Colby refuses to say whether he still has feelings for Chelsea. He later asks her to stop bringing up their past. Sergeant Phillip McCarthy (Nicholas Cassim) learns Chelsea and Colby used to date. He tells them they will be working together and warns them that if they do not act professionally, then one of them will have to leave. Chelsea learns that teens Raffy Morrison (Olivia Deeble), Ryder Jackson (Lukas Radovich) and Coco Astoni (Anna Cocquerel) have gone missing. She and Colby follow Dean to an abandoned house and Chelsea crawls through a fallen tunnel to get to an injured Raffy. Colby admits that he was worried about Chelsea's safety and kisses her, but she leaves. She later kisses him back and they reconcile their relationship, agreeing to work through their issues together.

Colby tells Chelsea that Dean went to prison for him, after they were involved in a fatal car accident. Their relationship is strained, as she realises that she has to hide another of his secrets. Colby gives her back the engagement ring, and after Chelsea discusses Colby's history in the River Boys with Willow, she asks Colby to propose to her properly. Chelsea calls her father Neil Campbell (Steve Nation) to tell him about the engagement and leaves him a voicemail. He then comes to the Bay and makes his disapproval of Colby clear. He asks Colby to give Chelsea up in exchange for information about his missing sister Bella Nixon (Courtney Miller), but Colby refuses. Chelsea then learns that her mother and sister will not come to the wedding. After Colby discovers that his stepfather Ross Nixon (Justin Rosniak) killed his parents, Chelsea begs Neil to send her Ross's address, which he does via text message. She later realises that Colby saw the message and has gone to get his sister. Chelsea ends the engagement and puts in a transfer application. Bella meets with Chelsea to ask her to talk to Colby. Chelsea tells Colby about the transfer and says goodbye to him. As she is driving out of Summer Bay, Colby catches up to her and gets her to pull over. Colby refuses to let her leave and tells her that he will fight for her. Colby, Chelsea and Bella take a trip away for a few days. On their return, they reveal that they are moving to the city. When Chelsea is accepted onto a detective course, she and Colby bring the wedding forward and they marry in Mangrove River.

Chelsea, Willow and Bella are kidnapped by Ross at gunpoint and he lures Colby into the bush, where he tries to shoot him. Willow is hit by the bullet and Chelsea tends to her, as Colby and Dean go after Ross. They eventually return to the Bay and explain that Ross got away, but Chelsea has doubts about their story. Colby later tells her that he shot Ross dead. Chelsea moves out to the caravan park, and later tells Colby that she cannot live with what he did. She gives him back her engagement and wedding rings, and leaves for the city. Chelsea sends Colby divorce papers the following year.

== Karen Thompson ==
Karen Thompson
- Home and Away character
- Portrayed by: Georgia Adamson
- Duration: 2018–2023, 2025
- First appearance: 4 October 2018
- Last appearance: 19 March 2025
- Introduced by: Lucy Addario
In-universe information
- Sons: Dean Thompson
- Grandsons: Jai Simmons
- Granddaughters: Izzy Thompson

Karen Thompson, played by Georgia Adamson, made her first appearance on 4 October 2018. The character and Adamson's casting details were announced on 24 September 2018. Karen is Dean Thompson's (Patrick O'Connor) mother. She was introduced in a bid to explore the character's backstory. Jackie Brygel of New Idea reported that Karen has "a history of violence as well as drug and alcohol abuse". She has never been "a stabilising influence" in Dean's life, and her appearance shows that she has not changed. After Dean attempts to talk to her on the phone, Karen "callously" ends the call. Dean then "goes off the rails" and begins drinking. His friend Willow Harris (Sarah Roberts) sees the call to Karen on Dean's phone and realises why he is acting that way. O'Connor said "Things take a bit of a wild turn when Dean's mum, Karen, arrives in the Bay." Daniel Kilkelly of Digital Spy branded Karen "wayward" and "irresponsible". Karen continued appearing in a recurring capacity in 2019, 2022 and 2023. Adamson reprised the role in March 2025, as Karen returns to the show alongside Dean and Ziggy Astoni (Sophie Dillman).

Dean contacts his mother to tell her that he is going to court, but she hangs up on him. Dean repeatedly calls Karen, but she does not pick up. He visits her home and watches as she reads a note he has left for her, before screwing it up and going back inside with a man. Karen comes to Summer Bay and follows Dean's friend Willow Harris (Sarah Roberts) to Justin Morgan's (James Stewart) house. Karen helps herself to some wine and assumes Willow is in the shower with Dean. Justin goes to find Dean, while Willow stays with Karen. After learning that Dean is working in a garage, Karen tells him she is proud of him. Karen loses her temper at Willow and demands another bottle of wine. She also shouts at John Palmer (Shane Withington) when Dean attempts to explain his absence from community service, and later attempts to run John down in her car. She crashes the car and injures her head. Karen refuses to see a psychiatrist, so Dean takes her to his caravan. Karen propositions Dean's friend Colby Thorne (Tim Franklin) when he comes to take her statement. Karen leaves the Bay after flagging down a passing motorist.

Upon her return, her behaviour continues to be erratic and she spirals out of control. She strikes Dean with a frying pan, knocking him unconscious and leaves the gas on before falling asleep. They are soon found by Willow. Karen leaves the hospital and Dean finds her on the beach, where he explains that she needs help. Karen breaks down completely and in a rage she claims that she has always hated her son, words which Dean ignores as he allows the police to take Karen away. Weeks later, Dean and Colby visit Karen, who has been diagnosed with schizoaffective disorder, and Karen apologises to Dean for what she said to him. Colby tries to ask Karen about his stepfather, Ross Nixon (Justin Rosniak), but she does not want to speak about him. She then reveals that Colby's mother, Michelle, is dead. Weeks later, Willow signs Karen out for the day, so she can speak with Dean. Karen says that she knows Ross turned up, and Dean and Colby got into some trouble. Dean tells her that Colby shot and killed Ross. He also says that he cannot stop thinking about it and has been having nightmares. Karen makes Dean promise her that he will seek help.

Karen returns to the Bay and befriends Ben Astoni (Rohan Nichol) at the caravan park, while she waits for Dean. She tells her son that she has been discharged from the hospital and plans to stay with him. Over dinner, Dean tells Karen that he knows his father is Rick Booth (Mark Lee) and that he tracked him down. Karen explains that they had a drunken one-night stand and he rejected her when he learned of her pregnancy, as his wife was also pregnant. Colby's sister Bella Nixon (Courtney Miller) reveals Dean is in a relationship with Ziggy Astoni (Dillman), and Karen questions Dean as to why he is keeping secrets from her. Karen soon meets Ziggy and learns Ben is her father. She and Dean are invited to dinner at The Farmhouse, where she upsets Maggie Astoni (Kestie Morassi) when she asks why Ben is not living at home. Karen attempts to find a job and asks at the Diner and then Salt, where she meets the new owner Mackenzie Booth (Emily Weir). Dean reveals that she is Rick's daughter and his half-sister. Karen realises Dean has been lying to her and tries to leave town, but Mackenzie finds her and explains that Rick abandoned her and her mother too. She tried to get revenge on Rick and she and Karen bond. Karen returns to Salt with Mackenzie, where she realises that Dean did not think that she could handle the truth and they make up. Mackenzie gives Karen a waitressing job at Salt, but Karen struggles with the ordering system. While serving a large table, Karen accidentally bumps into John Palmer, starting an argument. She pours a drink over his head and then faints, which Dean thinks she is faking, but it turns out to be a side effect of her medication. She and Dean make up and Karen gets a job in nearby Reefton Lakes.

== Simone Bedford ==
Simone Bedford
- Home and Away character
- Portrayed by: Emily Eskell
- Duration: 2018–2019
- First appearance: 15 November 2018
- Last appearance: 10 June 2019
- Introduced by: Lucy Addario
In-universe information
- Occupation: Trainee chef Learning support teacher
- Sons: Mason

Simone Bedford, played by Emily Eskell, made her first appearance on 15 November 2018. Prior to securing the part of Simone, Eskell had auditioned for the show several times since her graduation from the National Institute of Dramatic Art in 2013. She felt that she was in with a good chance of getting the role upon receiving the brief. She explained, "Usually they [the character briefs] come to me and I'm like, 'Oh, I'm not your super-typical Aussie Home And Away gal'. I've always found it hard to get work in Australia because of that." Home and Away marks Eskell's first major television role.

Simone was introduced as a potential love interest for Brody Morgan (Jackson Heywood), who is married. Eskell told Jackie Brygel of New Idea that Simone is a special-needs teacher, who loves cooking and wants to pursue it as a career, believing that it could be "her new lease on life." The actress added that her character has "a good heart" and is both gentle and "well-intentioned". Simone grows closer to Brody after winning a cooking lesson at an auction. Eskell commented, "Simone comes to Summer Bay because she hears what an amazing chef Brody is. She can't wait to begin working with him. She has sort of a 'career crush' on Brody." As Simone and Brody get started on her lesson, his wife Ziggy Astoni (Sophie Dillman) watches them and sees Simone flirting with Brody. Simone and Brody later have an affair, which ends Brody's marriage to Ziggy, and he and Simone leave the Bay together.

Simone enters the winning bid at a charity auction for a cooking lesson with chef Brody Morgan. Simone flirts with Brody and later meets his wife Ziggy Astoni. The lesson and a subsequent cooking challenge goes well, leading Brody to hire Simone for a one-month trial at Salt. Brody and Simone bond over their love of cooking, and she helps him out with prep work when the restaurant get busy. Simone overhears Ziggy making fun of her and blaming her for Brody cancelling lunch plans. Ziggy apologises and Brody assures Simone that she is doing well. Simone accidentally locks herself and Brody in the store cupboard, and he helps to calm her down when she gets claustrophobic. They are found by Ziggy and Brody's brother, Justin Morgan (James Stewart). Simone tells Brody that their relationship is purely professional, after he speaks with her at Ziggy's request. Ziggy attempts to set Simone up with Mason Morgan (Orpheus Pledger), but they are not interested in each other, so she tries befriending her instead. Ziggy finds a picture of Brody on Simone's phone, which Simone apologises for. Later that day, Brody tells Simone that she cannot work at Salt any longer, as he needs to put his marriage first. Simone then kisses him. Brody says the kiss should not have happened and asks Simone to finish up at Salt. He later gives her a job reference and admits his feelings for her.

Simone returns a couple of weeks later and helps Brody out at the restaurant. They have sex, but she is angry to learn that he is still married. However, she decides that she wants to stay in Summer Bay and begins an affair with Brody. Ziggy discovers Simone is back and Brody explains that her city job fell through and he is rehiring her for a while. Brody tells Simone that he loves Ziggy, but he wants to be with her. Justin learns of the affair and asks Simone to quit her job and leave. Simone struggles to see Brody and Ziggy together and quits the restaurant. She gets a job at the local high school as a learning support teacher to Bella Nixon (Courtney Miller) and Raffy Morrison (Olivia Deeble). Ziggy confronts Simone about her agenda for staying in the Bay, leading to Simone asking Brody to stay away from her. Brody later declares his love for Simone and vows to leave Ziggy after her 21st birthday for her. However, Ziggy catches them together in Simone's caravan, which leads to the end of Brody's marriage. Simone continues working at the school alongside Ziggy's mother Maggie Astoni (Kestie Morassi), but Raffy refuses to have her as a tutor. Simone and Brody face anger from the Astonis, Raffy and Mason when they go public with their relationship. The Morgans also disapprove when she stays the night with Brody at the cottage where he lived with Ziggy. Brody suggests they move in together somewhere else. After they are rejected for a rental agreement due to Brody's criminal record, he tells Simone about his past drug addiction. She asks that they slow things down and get to know one another. Simone is embarrassed when her office door is graffitied with the word "homewrecker", and is upset to learn that it was Bella, who apologises. Simone resigns and she and Brody decide to leave the Bay together. Brody puts Salt up for sale, while Simone finds a new job. Simone helps organise Raffy's 16th birthday party, but she is upset when Ziggy's sister, Coco Astoni (Anna Cocquerel) tells her and Brody that they do not deserve happiness. She plans to leave the Bay without Brody, who has been having doubts about selling Salt. Simone and Brody sell Salt and they move to Yarra Valley together. Two years later, Simone and Brody call Tori and Justin to let them know that they are expecting their first child.

== Bella Nixon ==
Bella Nixon, played by Courtney Miller, made her first appearance on 26 November 2018. Miller's casting was confirmed in September, while her character has been referrered to several times on-screen. Miller previously appeared in the serial as an extra when she was 15. Bella is the long-lost, younger sister of Colby Thorne (Tim Franklin). Colby has been searching for her and her father Ross Nixon (Justin Rosniak) for a number of years. When Colby comes face-to-face with his sister again, "a traumatised" Bella threatens him with a crossbow. Miller explained, "Colby is absolutely the enemy to Bella. She has no idea how destructive her father has been in what he's told her about Colby. She's terrified, but puts on a front." Miller also told Jackie Brygel of New Idea that she loved playing Bella, saying "she is ultimately a troubled child due to her upbringing". Miller received a nomination for the Logie Award for Most Popular New Talent in 2019.

== Others ==
Date(s)	Character	Actor	Circumstances
29 January	Nurse	Kate Boladian	The nurse informs Tori Morgan that someone is enquiring after Kat Chapman, who was brought into the hospital after a road traffic accident.
30 January	Odette	Romy Poulier	Odette meets with Willow Harris to pay her for helping to prove that Odette's husband is a cheater. Odette asks Willow if she will do the same thing for her friend.
1 February 2018 27 February 2020	Nurse Ruby	Christina Falsone	A Nurse at Northern Districts Hospital. Leah Patterson asks her where Jasmine Delaney is, as her room is empty. The nurse calls security after realising that she is missing. Two years later, nurse Ruby takes care of Colby Thorne, who is admitted with a stab wound to the leg, and she tells him to slow down his breathing. She also tells him he will get some stronger pain medication after he is assessed by the doctor. The character was initially credited as Nurse, before being credited as Nurse Ruby in later appearances.
1 February	Devera	Mia Karaz	Kat Chapman's mother and brother attend her funeral.
1 February	Paulo	Christian Leiva Fuentes	Kat Chapman's mother and brother attend her funeral.
1 February	Minister	Richard Saunders	The minister conducts Kat Chapman's funeral service.
1–22 February	Taz	Jerome Meyer	Taz is a member of the River Boys, who comes to Summer Bay to help Martin Ashford to find Robbo. Dean Thompson sends Taz to search the cottage that Robbo was last seen at. When they return, Taz and the others disrupt the wake at Salt. Taz and Bluey go to Summer Bay Fit to question people about Robbo and Mason asks them to leave. Taz decides he and Bluey should take advantage of the free trial. Mason asks them to go when they continue harassing gym members and he squares up to Taz. Taz and Bluey approach Mason outside the Surf Club and they start a fight. Colby Thorne intervenes and Taz punches him. The police turn up and arrest Taz and Bluey. Taz later informs Ash that he and some of the River Boys spoke to a man at a service station who saw Robbo, and they decide to return to speak to him.
1–19 February	Bluey	Alex Jewson	Bluey is a member of the River Boys, who comes to Summer Bay to help Martin Ashford find Robbo. Bluey and Taz go to Summer Bay Fit to question people about Robbo and Mason asks them to leave. Taz decides he and Bluey should take advantage of the free trial. Mason asks them to go when they continue harassing gym members and he manhandles Bluey. Taz and Bluey approach Mason outside the Surf Club and they start a fight. Colby Thorne intervenes and helps Mason, before the police turn up and arrest Bluey and Taz.
1 February	Jimmy Tobias	Kyle Hazebroek	Jimmy tells Dean Thompson and Martin Ashford that he spoke to an old man, who gave Robbo a lift. Jimmy and Ash almost get into a fight.
8 February	Bushwalker	Adam Hedditch	The bushwalker notices Robbo behind the wheel of a stationary car and calls the police, knowing he is a wanted man.
8 February	Ambulance Officer Karen	Jerusha Sutton	Karen brings Justin Morgan to the hospital after he is involved in a car crash. She later helps Mason Morgan to treat and rescue Alf Stewart from a sink hole.
12 February	Lauren	Lianne Mackessy	After finding a photograph of his family, amnesiac Robbo recalls the memory of his wife Lauren and their two children, Sophia and Lucas, celebrating his birthday. He thinks he remembers the day they all died in a car accident, but when Tori Morgan asks Colby Thorne to search for them, Colby finds out that they were all murdered in a home invasion.
12 February	Sophia	Ava Rose Bowen	After finding a photograph of his family, amnesiac Robbo recalls the memory of his wife Lauren and their two children, Sophia and Lucas, celebrating his birthday. He thinks he remembers the day they all died in a car accident, but when Tori Morgan asks Colby Thorne to search for them, Colby finds out that they were all murdered in a home invasion.
12 February	Lucas	Luca Rochaix	After finding a photograph of his family, amnesiac Robbo recalls the memory of his wife Lauren and their two children, Sophia and Lucas, celebrating his birthday. He thinks he remembers the day they all died in a car accident, but when Tori Morgan asks Colby Thorne to search for them, Colby finds out that they were all murdered in a home invasion.
19 February–13 June	Dr Callan	Virginie Laverdure	Dr Callan is Maggie Astoni's oncologist. She tells Maggie that they have caught her cancer early and it has not spread. Dr Callan also suggests starting a course of chemotherapy straight away to treat her high-grade B-cell lymphoma. Dr Callan meets with Maggie a few weeks later to inform her that her white cell count is up. A couple of months later, Dr Callan tells Maggie that her cancer has spread and she wants to treat it with immunotherapy, as well as chemotherapy.
20–22 February	David	Jack Ellis	David is Jasmine Delaney's former boyfriend. After stalking her for months, David finally shows up in Summer Bay and asks Hunter King for directions to the local caravan park. When Jasmine returns to her caravan, she finds David sitting on her bed and he tells her they need to talk. David insists that he and Jasmine leave the Bay together. He takes her up to Summer Bay House to return her caravan keys to Leah Patterson. Leah insists that they both stay for lunch. After a heated conversation, Leah and Jasmine try to escape, but David grabs them and tells them to stay. Ryder Jackson returns home and David holds him, Leah and Jasmine hostage. David allows Leah to order a pizza for him and Jasmine, and she adds an SOS message to the receipt. Shortly after, Colby Thorne arrives and arrests David. Jasmine visits David to officially reject him and tell him that what he did was not out of love, and when David protests that they had something, Jasmine rebukes that, too, tauntingly telling David to have fun in jail before leaving.
26 February–17 May	Barry Johnson	Brad McMurray	Barry accuses his former employee Dean Thompson of stealing his tools, while Dean accuses him of withholding his wages. Dean provokes Barry into a fight, which is broken up by Martin Ashford and Justin Morgan. Ash later calls Barry and arranges for him to pay Dean, who gives the tools back. Barry is hired to fix the sinkhole at the local high school. He tells Maggie Astoni that work will have to take place during classes, but it will be safe. Barry interviews Maggie's husband Ben Astoni for a job and later offers it to him. Barry warns Ben about talking to his wife while on the job. Ben tells Barry that Maggie has cancer, and while Barry sympathises with Ben's situation, he tells him that he should have considered that before taking the job. When Ben has to leave early, he tells Barry that he quits.
28 February, 12 March	Professor Pickford	Lisa Kay	Professor Pickford is a psychiatrist, who meets with Tori Morgan at Salt to discuss Robbo, who has been suffering from amnesia. Tori takes Professor Pickford to the local police station to meet Robbo. Professor Pickford tells Sergeant Phillip McCarthy that she will be endorsing Tori's evaluation of Robbo, and writes a statement for the magistrate. A couple of weeks later, Robbo has a therapy session with Professor Pickford. He refuses to talk about his relationships and leaves.
8 March	Joseph	Ishak Issa	Joseph notices Mason Morgan at a university party and comes over to say hello. He asks if Mason is coming back to study medicine, and they agree to catch up soon.
8 March	Li Xue	Indiana Kwong	Li Xue helps Mason Morgan to re-enrol at Yabbie Creek University. She tells him that he needs to sort out his hospital placement first, as he has been suspended from Northern Districts.
14 March	Dr Lucas	Grant Cartwright	Dr Lucas treats Dean Thompson after he is brought in following a collapse. When he suffers hallucinations, Dr Lucas asks Willow Harris and Colby Thorne if Dean has taken something, as he does not believe that Dean has just been drinking beer.
14 March	Julian Wells	Tahki Saul	Julian is Ben Astoni's solicitor. He tells Ben that he is eighth on the list for that day's court hearings, but he will be out in time to make his wife's hospital appointment. When Ben decides to leave, he advises him that if he misses his hearing he will be facing a fine and possibly jail time.
20–21 March 2018, 26 August 2020	Ambo Ken	Joshua Morton	Ambulance officer Ken tends to Martin Ashford after he is crushed by a car, and assists Tori Morgan in administering treatment. Two years later, he and another ambulance officer are called to treat Justin Morgan, who was found by Alf Stewart unconscious amid hydrofluoric acid, which has burnt his arm.
21 March	Lisa Petrov	Kate Williams	Lisa is a lawyer hired to represent Robbo. When she suggests that he should plead insanity, Robbo refuses and fires her.
22 March–4 April	Kurt Adams	Tiriel Mora	Kurt is a lawyer, who meets with Tori Morgan and Robbo to discuss taking on Robbo's case, which Kurt hopes will bring him wealthy clients, as it is high-profile. He gets in contact with the DPP to find out what evidence they have on Robbo, and tells Robbo and Tori that they have CCTV footage of Robbo's escape from the police station and assault on Martin Ashford. Kurt agrees to take on the case. When Kurt decides that they should say Kat Chapman was a crooked officer, Robbo grabs Kurt's shirt and tells him to shut up. Kurt tells Tori that he quits, but later changes his mind when Tori suggests that he finds another defence for Robbo. Kurt plans to eliminate as many of the charges against Robbo as he can, including those attributed to Beckett Reid. Kurt wants Ash to testify that it was Kat's idea to release Robbo, but Tori refuses to ask him. Kurt soon learns that Robbo is being charged with Dylan Carter's murder. He advises Robbo not to testify, but Robbo insists that he will. At the conclusion of the trial, Robbo is taken away from the federal police.
26 March	Theresa Clarke	Debbie Zukerman	Theresa is an administrative assistant at Summer Bay High, who brings Maggie Astoni some public liability forms to fill in and a list of problems that she needs to look into. Theresa later tells Maggie that the department wants to discuss some timetables and that the builder has left early.
27 March	Gordon	Haris Mirza	Gordon agrees to pair up with Raffy Morrison for an assignment during their English class.
3–4 April	Samantha Woodhouse	Charlotte Cashion	Samantha approaches Robbo outside the courthouse and poses as a journalist asking questions about his trial. The following day, Samantha approaches Robbo again and he tells her to stop calling him Beckett Reid. She then contacts someone to let them know that something has changed and to get things ready to go. Samantha later interrupts the trial, revealing that she is a federal agent and takes Robbo into custody.
3 April	Prosecutor	Lucy Bell	The prosecutor in Robbo's trial tries to convince the jury that Robbo is guilty of murder and assault.
3 April	Magistrate	Richie Singer	The magistrate in Robbo's trial. Robbo's lawyer Kurt Adams argues that Martin Ashford should not testify for the prosecution, but the magistrate allows it. He also allows the defence's medical evidence about Robbo's amnesia. Before the magistrate can hear the jury's verdict on the first charge, federal agents interrupt and take Robbo into custody. The magistrate tells Kurt that they can not stop them and puts the court in recess.
3 April	Court Officer	Ben Dalton	The court officer calls everyone into the court for Robbo's trial. He reads out the charges and later calls Martin Ashford to testify.
3 April	Foreperson	Karina Bracken	The foreperson tells the magistrate that the jury has reached a verdict.
3 April	Dr Lucy Dobson	Danielle Baynes	Dr Dobson informs the Astoni family that Ziggy Astoni has gastroenteritis and is not suffering a reaction to the stem cell injections she is taking. Dr Dobson tells Ziggy that they will keep her in overnight to rehydrate her and then collect the stem cells when she is better.
3 April–25 June	Hazel Easton	Genevieve Lemon	Hazel brings Ava Gilbert a snack and tells her that her father is working late, so they have agreed that Ava can stay with Hazel for the night. Hazel later meets with Ava's father Justin Morgan to collect a ransom of $25,000. She allows Justin to briefly speak to Ava, before demanding the money, but he refuses to hand it over until she tells him where Ava is. Hazel is spooked by a noise caused by Colby Thorne and Ben Murray and she drives off. Willow Harris recognises a description of Hazel and reveals that she is Boyd Easton's mother, who is out for revenge. Boyd goes to collect the ransom, and when Hazel calls him, Sergeant McCarthy informs her that Boyd was injured during a police operation. Hazel sends her daughter, Ebony to find out more information and she tells Hazel that Boyd died. They both swear revenge on those involved in Boyd's death. Hazel wants Ebony to hurry up and make Colby pay for killing Boyd, but Ebony asks her mother to have patience with her plan. Hazel continues to ask Ebony for updates. Colby and Justin later track Hazel down to a motel in Mangrove River, but she escapes before they get to her. She stays with Ebony in Summer Bay. As Ebony executes her revenge plan, she kills Hazel to set up Robbo.
16 April	Herself	Natalie Barr	Natalie Barr reads out an appeal for witnesses who have seen missing child Ava Gilbert.
18 April	Nurse	Adeline Lee	The nurse attends to Ziggy Astoni as she undergoes stem cell collection.
19 April	Police Officer	Murray Scarce	The police officer and his colleagues raid Hazel Easton's house looking for Ava Gilbert.
30 April	Rick	Ben Purser	Rick welcomes Ben Astoni to workforce. He advises him to turn off his phone, as their boss Barry Johnson might fire him if he sees Ben using it. At the end of the day, Rick persuades Ben to have a drink with the crew at Salt.
3 May	Dominic Pfeiffer	Uncredited	Dominic is an inspector from NSW Fair Trading, who checks over Summer Bay Auto, following an accident with Ebony Harding's car. Dominic tells Justin Morgan that after looking over the car, he found the brake line was frayed and covered in fluid. As it should have been picked up on, Dominic recommends the garage is closed while Fair Trading investigates work place practices.
7 May–4 July	Catherine	Lisbeth Kennelly	Catherine is Ty Anderson's case worker. She brings him to Summer Bay to meet his foster parents John Palmer and Marilyn Chambers. Weeks later, Catherine returns and finds Ty in the midst of an argument with Raffy Morrison. She tells John and Marilyn that she has received two reports; one about Ty's hospital admittance and one from the police saying he went missing. John and Marilyn apologise for their oversight, but they refuse to tell Catherine the reason why Ty ran off, and she informs them that she may have to take Ty away. Catherine asks Ty if he is being pressured into keeping quiet, but he tells her that he has never felt safer in his life with John and Marilyn. Catherine accepts that Ty is in the best place for his wellbeing.
9–10 May	Gus	Alex Nicholas	Gus moors his boat at the pier and unloads several boxes. Hunter King asks him to move his boat, as a barge needs to dock there, but Gus tells him to leave. Robbo sees Gus push Hunter and comes down to confront him and his two associates, knowing that they are not unloading fish. A fight breaks out and Hunter suffers a head injury. Robbo performs a citizen's arrest on Gus, who is taken away by the police.
23–24 May	Jason	Elijah Williams	Jason is an AFP recruit. Robbo plays a joke on during a run, so he loses. Jason approaches Robbo, after learning that he is retraining, and asks him to talk to a few of the recruits about his experiences on the job. Jason tells Robbo that if he beats him on the beep test, Robbo has to talk to him about anything he wants to know. Robbo agrees and then beats Jason's time. Robbo later asks Jason why he wants to become a federal police officer and they both realise that they want to make a difference. Robbo then allows Jason to ask him anything.
23 May	Trainer	Steve Willis	The trainer puts the AFP recruits through various exercises to test their fitness. He forces Robbo to do more sit-ups than the others, as he is undergoing specialist training.
31 May–13 September	Dempsey Blackwood	Sophie Don	Dempsey attends a singles night at Salt and meets Mason Morgan. They sit down to talk and she learns that they both work at Northern Districts Hospital. Their date is interrupted by Hunter King and Olivia Fraser Richards who need advice from Mason, and Dempsey leaves. A couple of weeks later, Dempsey returns to Salt and Mason buys her a drink as an apology for getting distracted during their date. Mason and Hunter ask her for help with organising a buck's night, and Mason invites her to be his plus one at his brother, Brody Morgan's wedding. They later go back to her place. Weeks later, Dempsey tells Mason that she is pregnant with his child. Dempsey feels pressured to make a decision when Mason says he will support her. But she later tells him that she wants them to be a couple and have the baby together, to which Mason agrees. After a miscarriage scare, Dempsey tells Mason that she does not want to have the baby. She quits her job and tells Mason that she has booked an abortion.
31 May	Raj	Bali Padda	Raj is paired with Olivia Fraser Richards at a singles night at Salt, while Suz meets Hunter King. After learning that she is a fashion designer, Raj tells Olivia that he works in sales at a clothes shop. Suz reveals she is a nutritionist when she stops Hunter from eating a snack that is high in fat. Hunter encourages her to relax and eat what they want. Neither Olivia or Hunter want to go on a date with Raj and Suz.
31 May	Suz	Bianca Magistro	Raj is paired with Olivia Fraser Richards at a singles night at Salt, while Suz meets Hunter King. After learning that she is a fashion designer, Raj tells Olivia that he works in sales at a clothes shop. Suz reveals she is a nutritionist when she stops Hunter from eating a snack that is high in fat. Hunter encourages her to relax and eat what they want. Neither Olivia or Hunter want to go on a date with Raj and Suz.
6 June	Matt "Spider" Sullivan	Andrew Shaw	Spider is serving behind a bar in Mangrove River when Colby Thorne and Justin Morgan ask him for information about Boyd Easton's crew. Spider tells them the crew will be in around lunch time, and he later points them out to Colby and Justin.
6 June	Roach	Michael Handley	Colby Thorne tells Roach that he spoke to Hazel Easton about a job that needs doing, and she advised him to speak with Roach and his crew. Roach goes outside to make a call and Justin Morgan asks him where Hazel is. Roach recognises him, but before he can touch him, Colby emerges with Matt "Spider" Sullivan and friends.
6 June	Roach's Offsider	Todd Williams	Roach's fellow crew member sees Colby Thorne and Justin Morgan leaving to find Hazel Easton, and tells them that she says hello.
26 June	Dance Teacher	Sally Dangar	Ben Astoni follows a video tutorial for a waltz presented by the dance teacher.
27 June	Danielle	Natalia Ladyko	Danielle is a stripper who performs at Brody Morgan's buck's night.
28 June	Rhea	Kirsty Marillier	Rhea is Dempsey Blackwood's friend and Hunter King's date for Brody Morgan and Ziggy Astoni's wedding.
28 June	Celebrant	Gil Balfas	The celebrant conducts Brody Morgan and Ziggy Astoni's wedding.
4 July–8 August	Brett	Graeme McRae	Dean Thompson borrows $3500 from Brett. Dean ignores a phone call from Brett, who then appears behind him and asks him for his money back. Dean protests that the deadline is not due until next week, but Brett wants it the following day. Dean fails to get the money, so Brett doubles the debt and has Dean beaten up. Dean later asks Brett if he can work off the debt instead. Brett agrees and asks Dean to hold onto a bag of money for a week. He later asks Dean to get him the keys and access to the safe at Salt. During the robbery, the police arrive and arrest Brett, Dean and the others.
16 July–	Abbi	Kaitlyn Boye	Abbi bullies Raffy Morrison after learning that she broke up with her boyfriend Ty Anderson. She continues making comments to Raffy, until Ty tells her that he and Raffy broke up because he is gay. Months later, Abbi spends the day making comments and bullying Raffy upon her return to school following her epilepsy diagnosis. Raffy later physically attacks Abbi, who claims she has a broken nose. She is treated by Tori Morgan and Raffy apologises.
17 July–30 August	Christina Harrison	Jessica Clarke	Christina is a university lecturer. She meets with Hunter King to praise his recent assignment and suggests he tries out for a student placement with a local basketball team. Christina helps with his training and they later kiss. she apologises, but Hunter tells her he wanted it too and they continue to train together. Leah Patterson warns Christina against dating Hunter, as she is in a position of power. Christina and Hunter have sex at her motel, but she suffers doubts about their relationship afterwards. She attempts to tell Hunter that she is married, but they have sex again. Her husband later arrives and asks Hunter to leave, so he can confront Christina. Hunter asks Christina to assign him to a new tutor, but she fails to do so and he makes a formal complaint against her. She later accuses him of stalking and sexual harassment. Hunter asks Christina to meet him at Salt to talk, and when she mentions their relationship, he reveals that a representative from student affairs has been recording their conversation.
6–15 August	Jodi Anderson	Sara Zwangobani	Jodi is Ty Anderson's mother. Following his sixteenth birthday, she contacts the foster agency and asks to see him, but he refuses. Ty's foster mother Marilyn Chambers meets with Jodi, who explains that she could not cope with Ty following the death of her husband. She asked his grandparents to take care of him, but when she returned, his grandparents would not let her see him. Following his grandmother's death, Jodi learned that Ty was in foster care. She begs Marilyn to talk to Ty and convince him to see her. Jodi comes to Summer Bay and Marilyn encourages Ty to spend time with her. Over breakfast, Jodi tells Ty and the Palmers that she has to cut her visit short as she is needed back at work. Ty decides that he wants to live with Jodi and they leave the Bay together.
9 August	DC Jane Berkin	Julia Billington	Deputy Commissioner Berkin leads Colby Thorne's tribunal. She expresses concern about Colby's association with the River Boys gang and his continuing friendship with Dean Thompson. Colby tells her that he is not going to stop being friends with Dean and is unwilling to remove his tattoos. He reiterates that he is a cop and not a River Boy. He is later reinstated.
14 August	Tony	Ryan Brown	Tony finds his wife Christina Harrison in bed with Hunter King at a motel. He tells Hunter to leave, before confronting her.
12 September	Claudia	Cassie Sloan	Claudia notices Dean Thompson at the caravan park. She accepts Dean's invitation for a drink in his van.
13 September	Court Officer	Ben MacLaine	The Court Officer serves Willow Harris with a subpoena.
27 September, 1 October	Meredith	Lenore Munro	Meredith interviews Robbo and Tori Morgan in a pre-IVF counselling session. She asks Robbo about his deceased children, but he struggles to open up about them. Robbo returns to speak with Meredith, who tells him that a new child will not erase the guilt he feels about the deaths of his family.
4 October	Stephen	Christian Willis	Stephen is a food blogger who comes to Salt to review the dishes. Ziggy Astoni waits on him and tries to discourage him from ordering the duck, but chef Brody Morgan tells him that it will be fine. Ziggy continues to stall Stephen, which he finds rude. Brody serves Stephen the duck, which he enjoys and posts a positive review of the food on his blog.
18 October	Intruder	Joseph Taylor	The intruder breaks into Karen Thompson's house, but is confronted by her son Dean Thompson and Colby Thorne. The man claims that he wants to take back what he is owed, as he lent Karen some money, but when he insults her, Dean throws him out.
24–25 October	Kayla Booth	Audrey Blyde	Kayla arrives home just as Dean Thompson knocks on the door. He asks for her father Rick, and she calls him to come outside. Kayla asks her father who Dean is, but Dean tells her he is no one and leaves.
24 October 2018–22 July 2019	Rick Booth	Mark Lee	Dean Thompson believes Rick is his father, and comes to Rick's home to tell him that he is Karen Thompson's son. Dean shows him a letter and Rick explains that he did not know Karen was pregnant until after Dean was born, but he had a family of his own by then. Dean realises that Rick's family do not know about him, and threatens to show his daughter Kayla the letter. Dean returns the following day, and Rick asks him to name his price to leave and not come back.
25–31 October	Neil Campbell	Steve Nation	Neil comes to Yabbie creek police station, after his daughter, Chelsea Campbell leaves him a voicemail telling him she is engaged to fellow officer Colby Thorne. Neil is angry that Chelsea lied to him about Colby's gang background, while he tells Colby that he thinks he will hold his daughter back and should walk away. Colby says no, so Neil threatens his career. Neil then tells Colby that he knows where his missing sister Bella is. Chelsea asks her father to give the information to Colby, but he refuses and tells her that he just wants to protect her. Colby turns down Neil's offer of the information in exchange for giving up Chelsea. Neil later texts Chelsea an address.
1 November	Edwina	Briony Williams	Edwina is from the Department of Education. She meets with Maggie Astoni and Ryder Jackson, who has received poor exam results. Maggie explains that Ryder's marks were affected by a recent accident that injured a friend, and has the potential to achieve an above average HSC. Edwina does not think that is a good enough reason why his case should be reassessed. Ryder's grandfather Alf Stewart explains that Ryder has not had any stability in his life until recently, but Edwina points out that his issues should have been documented beforehand. Alf then cuts the meeting short. The Department later allows Ryder to retake his exams.
1 November	Fertility Doctor	Devora Lieberman	Tori Morgan's fertility doctor who carries out the transfer of her fertilised embryo.
12 November	PI Holsten	Sean Barker	A private detective hired by Dean Thompson and Colby Thorne to find Colby's sister and stepfather, Bella and Ross Nixon. Holsten tells Dean that he spoke to a man who saw Ross visit Dean's mother Karen Thompson.
15 November	Psych Nurse Bridget	Amanda Stephens-Lee	The psych nurse greets Colby Thorne and Dean Thompson, as they come to visit Dean's mother Karen. Bridget informs Dean that Karen has been diagnosed with schizoaffective disorder and is okay to be interviewed. Bridget then takes them to Karen's room. She later interrupts Colby's questioning to say that Karen has group therapy.
26 November 2018 – 20 February 2019	Ross Nixon	Justin Rosniak	Colby Thorne's stepfather and Bella Nixon's father. Colby has been trying to find Ross ever since he took off with his mother and sister. Colby learns that Ross killed both his parents. Shortly after leaving his home, Ross receives a text from Bella saying that Colby has turned up. He drives back home, passing Colby and Bella on the way. Ross comes to Summer Bay and urges Bella not to let Colby get into her head, but she later texts him to say she is staying in the Bay. Ross breaks into Colby's apartment and learns that he and Chelsea Campbell are getting married. He takes the place of their limo driver and kidnaps Bella, Chelsea and Willow Harris at gunpoint. He drives them into the bush, where Willow tackles Ross, allowing Chelsea and Bella to flee. Ross fires the gun and forces Bella to tie the others up. He asks Colby to choose between them, but Colby refuses and Ross shoots at him. Bella pushes Ross aside, causing the bullet to hit Willow. Ross is pursued to a quarry by Dean Thompson and Colby, who shoots and kills Ross. They set his car alight and bury his body in a shallow grave. Ross' body is found a year later by bushwalkers.
13 December	Nugget	Sam Webb	Nugget allows Colby Thorne and Chelsea Campbell's wedding to be held on his land. He brings the alcohol to the wedding and briefly interrupts the ceremony when he drops a cooler.
