= Colby Thorne =

Fictional character

- Home and Away character
- Portrayed by: Tim Franklin
- Duration: 2018–2021
- First appearance: 6 February 2018
- Last appearance: 11 February 2021
- Introduced by: Lucy Addario
In-universe information
- Occupation: Senior Constable
- Father: Andrew Thorne
- Mother: Michelle Thorne
- Stepfather: Ross Nixon
- Half-sisters: Bella Nixon
- Wife: Chelsea Campbell (2018–2020)

Colby Thorne is a fictional character from the Australian television soap opera Home and Away, played by Tim Franklin. The actor learned from his agent that he had secured the role on his 27th birthday. He had previously made a guest appearance in the series as Azza Mason in 2015, but Colby is his first full-time television role. Franklin began filming in August 2017, and he made his first appearance during the episode broadcast on 6 February 2018. The character was introduced as a replacement for Kat Chapman (Pia Miller), who died in the season finale, and his arrival was publicised in a trailer showcasing upcoming 2018 storylines.

Colby is portrayed as a stoic and loyal police constable. He had a "turbulent upbringing", and upon his arrival he was hiding a secret concerning his personal life, which was woven throughout his early storylines. Colby's introduction saw him try to break up a fight involving members of the show's River Boys surf gang. It soon emerges that he is a former gang member, and is friends with the leader Dean Thompson (Patrick O'Connor). Producers established a romantic relationship between Colby and nurse Jasmine Delaney (Sam Frost), which led to the revelation that Colby is searching for his younger sister, who was kidnapped by his violent stepfather.

After Colby shoots Boyd Easton (Steve Le Marquand) while on duty, he becomes the focus of a revenge plot by Boyd's sister Ebony Harding (Cariba Heine), which culminates in Colby being poisoned and left for dead. Producers introduced the character's former fiancée Chelsea Campbell (Ashleigh Brewer) later that year, as well as his sister Bella Nixon (Courtney Miller). After a reconciliation and a brief break up, Colby and Chelsea marry in the 2018 season finale. Following his conviction for murdering his stepfather, Colby is sent to prison. He departed during the episode broadcast on 11 February 2021. For his portrayal of Colby, Franklin received a nomination for Best Soap Newcomer at the 2018 Digital Spy Reader Awards.

== Casting ==
On 5 February 2018, a reporter for The Daily Telegraph confirmed that actor Tim Franklin had joined the main cast as Senior Constable Colby Thorne. His casting and character had been teased in a trailer showcasing upcoming storylines for 2018, as well as press photographs showing him filming scenes at Palm Beach, the serial's outdoor filming location. Franklin learned that he had won the role on his 27th birthday. His agent contacted him and sang "Happy Birthday" down the phone, but changed his name to Colby. Franklin admitted that he "screamed" when he realised he had the part. The actor had previously appeared in the guest role of Azza Mason in 2015, but Colby is his first full-time television role. He stated that joining the cast again was "so much fun", adding "I used to pretend to be a cop when I was a little kid and it's funny now I do that for a living." Franklin began filming in August 2017, and he made his debut as Colby on 6 February 2018.

== Development ==
=== Characterisation ===
Colby was introduced as a replacement for fellow police constable Kat Chapman (played by Pia Miller), who died in the season finale. Franklin admitted to initially finding his character's occupation "daunting", but he found that when he puts on Colby's uniform it gives him "a sense of who the person is, that authoritarian role." He went on to explain that Colby's uniform takes "a while" to put on due to the weight and the heavy duty belt. Franklin enjoys exploring who Colby is beyond his uniform. He also believes that Colby is "very gifted" at his job, saying "He has a keen eye, he isn't bad with cuffs and he's a good shot – he'll be using these skills in the Bay!" Franklin added that Colby is secretly trying to solve a personal case, which he has "carried around since he joined the force".

Franklin said that Colby is stoic due to his "turbulent upbringing", and he has experienced "a lot of trauma" in his life. Franklin and Colby have few similarities, but the actor found himself empathising with his character. He went onto to explain, "He's striving to be a better man than the example he was given. He's loyal beyond doubt, and he's always keen for a laugh – but something from his past prevents him from truly connecting with people." Colby believes that by helping the residents of Summer Bay, he might be able to forgive himself for an event that happened in his past. In October 2018, Franklin told John Burfitt of Soap World that he found it "very different" playing Colby now compared to when he first started. He thought he knew his character and his motives better, and was comfortable in his portrayal of him.

=== Introduction ===
Colby makes his debut shortly after the reintroduction of the serial's River Boys surf gang to the Bay. He notices two of the gang members Taz (Jerome Meyer) and Bluey (Alex Jewson) following Mason Morgan (Orpheus Pledger) from the surf club, with the intention of attacking him. As Taz and Bluey start to fight with Mason, Colby gets involved and warns them both to back off. Taz then punches him in the face just as the police arrive to break up the fight. Taz and Bluey are arrested, as Colby reveals to Sergeant Phillip McCarthy (Nicholas Cassim) that he is the Bay's new senior constable. It soon emerges that Colby is a former member of the River Boys when he reveals a "Blood and Sand" tattoo that is synonymous with the group. Franklin believed viewers would be divided over where Colby's loyalties lie. He liked that the conflict between Colby's "two worlds" gave his character more depth. Colby enjoys his career in the police force, but he feels that his time with the River Boys helped him become the man he is today.

Colby was also given immediate links to the Bay through his friendships with River Boys member Dean Thompson (Patrick O'Connor) and Willow Harris (Sarah Roberts). Producers explored their dynamic early on as Colby shows guilt over something that happened in his past with Dean. He asks Dean to punch him in the hope that they can settle their grudge, but Dean refuses and tells Colby that he "lost everything" in a car crash they were both involved in. Dean then collapses and suffers convulsions due to a reaction to some home brewed beer. At the hospital, Willow questions Colby about the crash and Colby explains that he asked Dean to help him steal a car, but when it crashed, he left him to take the blame. Angered, Willow tells him that there is nothing he can say that will justify why he let Dean go to jail. As Dean recovers, he is "furious" that Willow knows the truth about the incident.

=== Relationship with Jasmine Delaney ===
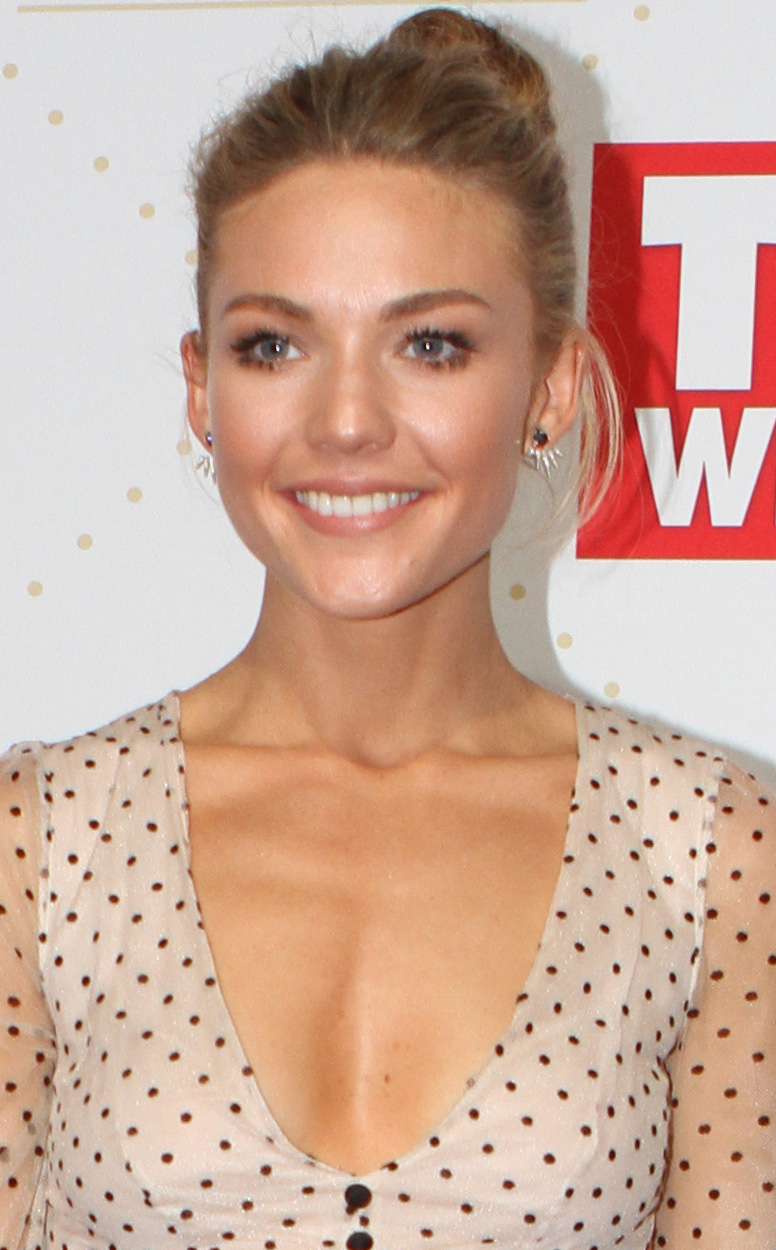
Jasmine Delaney, played by Sam Frost (pictured), is Colby's first love interest.

Tamara Cullen of TV Week speculated that Colby would become a love interest for nurse Jasmine Delaney (Sam Frost), and producers soon established a relationship between them. Colby and Jasmine meet when she reports her stalker to him. He assures her that he will help protect her. After she is stood up by Mason, Jasmine spends the afternoon getting to know Colby at local restaurant Salt. They bond over the fact they are both new to the Bay. At the end of their evening, they share "an unexpected kiss" while saying goodbye. Franklin and Frost later explained that they knew their characters would be involved in a romantic relationship from the moment they joined the cast. Franklin also said that the plot saw him perform his first ever on-screen kiss.

Colby and Jasmine grow closer and they have sex, but Colby says that their relationship cannot go any further. Colby is shown to have feelings for Jasmine, but he is worried about getting romantically attached due to a secret he is hiding. Writers then had Colby reveal to Jasmine that he has been searching for his younger sister Bella Nixon (Courtney Miller) and his mother, who were kidnapped by his violent stepfather. He explains that he joined the police force to help with his search, and that he would have to "drop everything", including any romantic relationships, and leave town if he were to find a lead.

As Jasmine supports Colby with his search, she develops feelings for him. Frost said that for her character, there was "always an attraction with Colby", while Franklin stated "Colby is more worried about entangling her in the dangers of what's happening in his life." Franklin also stated that if finding Bella had not been Colby's priority, then he would have more time to commit to a relationship, which Jasmine seems to understand. Colby and Jasmine agree to have a casual relationship. Jasmine also listens as Colby admits that he feels like a failure due to his family issues and broken friendship with Dean. Colby ends the relationship when he learns that Jasmine told her friend about his past with the River Boys, shortly before the information is leaked to the press.

=== Shooting and revenge campaign ===
Colby's job and life come under threat after he shoots a kidnapper, which leads to a vendetta against him by the man's family. The arc began with the kidnapping of Justin Morgan's (James Stewart) daughter Ava Gilbert (Grace Thomas). Following a failed ransom exchange, Colby is determined to anything to get Ava back. Knowing that criminal Boyd Easton (Steve Le Marquand) and his mother Hazel Easton (Genevieve Lemon) have Ava, he realises that "there may have to be sacrifices" in order to keep her safe. Franklin said that Colby plans a trap for the kidnappers, involving a strike team who will move in and save Ava. Willow, who is dating Justin, gives the ransom money to Boyd and he lets Ava go. But when Boyd becomes spooked, he grabs Willow and Dean suddenly appears out of the bushes to save her.

Speaking with Sarah Ellis of Inside Soap, Franklin explained, "Colby has to make a split-second decision – kill for those you love, or watch them die." Colby shoots Boyd, leaving him "deeply troubled" and feeling guilty and ashamed. But Franklin thought that if his character had the chance to do it again, he did not think Colby would change the outcome. Franklin admitted that he found the heightened emotion of the scene challenging, and he accidentally made shooting noises with his mouth when he fired the gun. Dean later confronts Colby about saving his life, which worries Colby as he think Dean might tell the police about his connection to the River Boys.

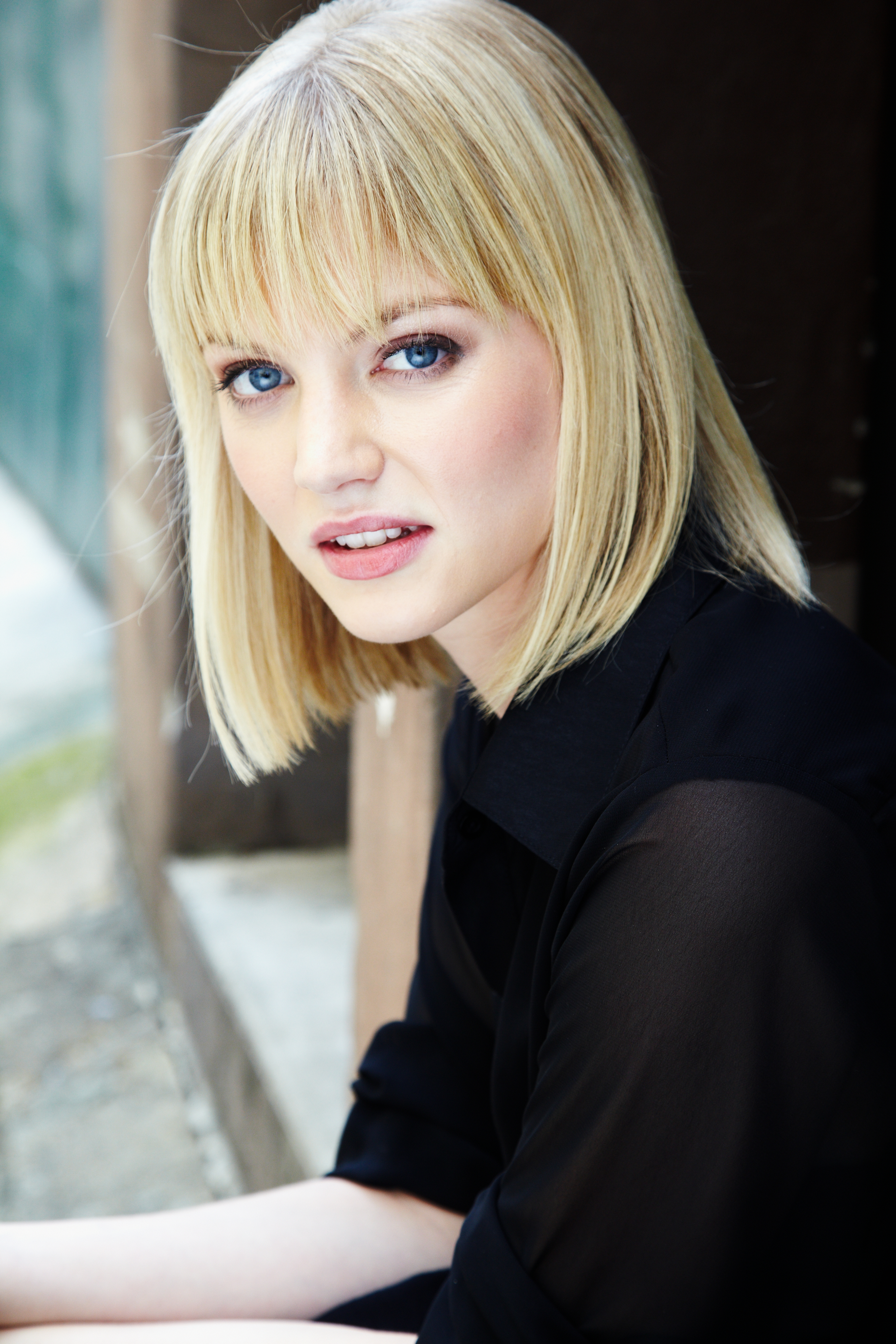
Ebony Harding, played by Cariba Heine (pictured), comes to the Bay to get revenge on Colby for shooting her brother.

Producers soon introduced Boyd's sister Ebony Harding, played by Cariba Heine, to the storyline. Ebony comes to Summer Bay with the intention of getting revenge on Colby and those involved in her brother's death. Ebony watches Colby's movements around the Bay, before conferring with her mother about their plan. Ebony later slashes her car tyre and asks for Colby's help in changing it, however, he is called into work allowing Mason and Hunter King (Scott Lee) to step in. Ebony later asks Colby out for a drink, but he turns her down due to his relationship with Jasmine. However, Ebony soon befriends Colby, who finds himself confiding in her about his personal life and his search for his sister. Franklin told John Burfitt of Soap World, Ebony is the one person who he feels he can really be himself with and relate to. He feels he can trust her and that they have a connection – but she has set that up by lying to him in so many ways."

Ebony plots to ruin Colby and Jasmine's relationship by gatecrashing their date at Salt and openly flirting with Colby. A show spokesperson told Claire Crick of Soaplife, "Ebony's flirty ways leave Jasmine jealous, especially when Colby seems to be innocently ignorant to all the extra attention he's been receiving from his new friend." Colby becomes fed up with Jasmine's jealously and they fight. He later learns that she has told her friend Leah Patterson about his River Boys past, and they fight again, which Ebony overhears.

Having sabotaged Colby's relationship with Jasmine, Ebony goes after Colby's career next. After learning that he used to be a part of the River Boys, she leaks the information to the local newspaper, which publishes it on the front page. Colby confronts Jasmine, who denies leaking the story, so he turns to Willow and Dean, who are offended by the accusation. Colby is placed on leave from the police force, as his superiors work out what to do. Ebony photographs him shaking hands with Dean and sends it to the station, who then suspend him without pay for associating with a known criminal and gang member. When Colby realises that someone has a vendetta against him, Ebony hints that it is his flatmate Robbo (Jake Ryan).

Ebony's plan comes to a climax when she poisons Colby and leaves him for dead. Ebony steals two vials of suxamethonium chloride (sux) from the hospital, before she goes to Colby's apartment and hits him with a frying pan. She injects him with a lethal dose of sux and leaves him to die. Colby is eventually found by Willow and Dean, and he is rushed to the hospital. Ebony also frames Robbo for murder, after she poisons her mother with the other vial of sux. Colby spends days in a coma after suffering an allergic reaction to the medication given to him at the hospital. When he wakes up, he learns that he suffers from malignant hyperthermia. He has a "shocking realisation" when he learns that the condition is genetic, meaning that his sister could have it. Colby discharges himself to continue his search with the new lead.

Ebony later returns to continue her revenge campaign against Colby. She pretends to be Colby's sister Bella, and sends him messages through an online page he has set up to find her. Colby agrees to meet her and ignores the concerns of Jasmine and Robbo, who think it could be a trap. Robbo forces Colby to wear an earpiece and records an online call between himself and Ebony for evidence. Colby is directed to an empty house and Ebony locks him inside a bedroom. She then taunts him through a walkie talkie and tells him he will not get out, before attempting to light the house on fire, however, Robbo arrives in time to stop her.

=== Relationship with Chelsea Campbell ===
In September 2018, producers introduced a new love interest for Colby in the form of police officer Chelsea Campbell (Ashleigh Brewer). While discussing Brewer's appearance on the show, Jackie Brygel of New Idea hinted that Chelsea and Colby already shared a connection. Brewer also teased the storyline, saying: "Chelsea turns up in the Bay with Colby on the brain and pretty much him alone. She knows what she wants out of life and she's going to keep going until she gets it. Colby's definitely a big part of the plan. They have a lot of history together and you feel that straight away." As Chelsea joins Colby at Yabbie Creek Station, it emerges that they were once engaged. Their boss Sergeant Phillip McCarthy (Nicholas Cassim) finds out about their previous relationship when he notices the tension between them. McCarthy is "furious" that they did not disclose their history and orders Colby to show Chelsea around, telling them that if they cannot work together, one of them will have to leave.

"Colby is the happiest he's ever been. This is his chance at a normal life – a life he never even dreamt could come close to happening. He now has his sister back in his life and he also has the love of his life by his side. He feels like the luckiest man in the world."

— Franklin on his character's wedding.

Chelsea tries to reconcile with Colby, but he rejects her attempts. Chelsea tells him that she came to the Bay because Colby has been blanking her and she finds it hard to cope without him. They almost kiss, but Colby pulls away. Colby later admits that he was "devastated" when Chelsea ended their engagement, while Chelsea explains that she thought he had returned to the River Boys. Franklin stated, "She knows about his past and, at the time, he laid it all on the table about being a River Boy. But she didn't want to be part of it." Colby also admits that he has missed Chelsea and they kiss. They then agree to give their relationship another go, with Franklin commenting "His resistance to her doesn't last long!" A wedding storyline was soon implemented for the couple. Colby gives Chelsea's engagement ring back to her, after telling her the truth about Dean and the car crash. She asks him to proposes to her properly, which he does. They decide to get married as soon as possible.

Writers devised a break up for the couple following Colby's reunion with his sister, Bella. Chelsea ends their engagement upon learning that Colby has lied to her about going to find Bella. She also knows that he stole the address from her phone, and then kidnapped his sister. Dean attempts to intervene, but Chelsea feels that he is responsible for recent bad events in Colby's life. Colby later learns that Chelsea told their boss about Bella's presence in the Bay, leading to a confrontation in which Chelsea reveals that she is leaving town. Franklin commented, "Colby and Chelsea's relationship is just so dramatic! It can be a real challenge for them to find a balance." Dean and Bella encourage Colby to fight for Chelsea, which is something Franklin thought his character needed to hear. He added, "It takes someone giving him that kick to fight for her. He needs that, and decides to put himself on the line and declare his love for her."

The characters marry in the 2018 season finale. In the lead up to the wedding, Chelsea, Colby and Bella make the decision to move to the city. When Chelsea is offered a job on a detective course, they move the wedding forward and are married in front of their friends. Brewer thought the "understated" ceremony was ideal for the couple, as they are not "showy" and just want to celebrate their love. Franklin thought that Colby had got the normal life and a family that he had wanted. Colby is unaware that his stepfather, Ross Nixon (Justin Rosniak) is watching and waiting to get revenge on him. Ross kidnaps Chelsea, Bella and Willow after posing as a limo driver. Franklin said the scenes were "intense" to film, and he added "everything from Colby's past comes crashing down, and he's chucked into a decision that changes everything for him."

=== Departure ===
Franklin's last scenes as Colby aired on 11 February 2021. Colby is sent to solitary confinement, following his conviction for murdering Ross. Franklin was surprised his character was not killed off and he admitted that he tried to convince the writers to let him "go out guns blazing." He told Maddison Hockey of TV Week that he loved Colby's ending, as he knew his character would have to "pay the price at some point." The open ended nature of his exit storyline means that Colby could return in the future. Franklin told Hockey that he had already spoken to producers about Colby coming back as "a bad, bad boy" who has escaped from prison, as he enjoyed playing the character's villainous side. Franklin added that he was sad to leave the show, as he felt that he and his co-stars had become a family over the years.

== Reception ==
For his portrayal of Colby, Franklin was nominated for Best Soap Newcomer at the 2018 Digital Spy Reader Awards; he came in last place with 0.9% of the total votes. Ahead of his debut, a reporter for The Daily Telegraph branded Colby the show's "new heart-throb cop". A TVNZ writer praised the character's introduction and looks, saying: "We might still be mourning Kat, but the hunky new constable is a welcome distraction." They also stated, "With handsome confidence and impeccable timing, Colby shows up just in time to save Mason from a brawl with the River Boys." TV Week's Tamara Cullen had a similar reaction, writing, "tall, handsome and confident, the new cop in town is bound to attract attention. And after making his big debut on Home and Away last night, he's done just that!" Inside Soap columnist Sarah admitted to being "quite intrigued" by the character and how he fits in with the new River Boys.

John Burfitt of Soap World included Colby in his feature on the six characters to watch closely in Australian soaps. Burfitt wrote, "Summer Bay's new cop Colby Thorne is a conflicted man, struggling to deal with the clash of his past and present lives." Burfitt called him "an avid crime fighter" and said he would "have his work cut out for him, with Dean and a new breed of River Boys arriving in town, which only means one thing – trouble!" Of the character's background, Claire Crick of Soaplife commented, "He arrived in Summer Bay to keep residents on the right side of the law... but it turns out that Senior Constable Colby Thorne isn't without his own murky past, because he used to be a River Boy!" Seth Adamson from TV Soap said that Colby and Dean were the "next generation of the River Boys" and "that clash is sure to make for some potent drama."

Of the character's romance with Jasmine, a TV Week columnist commented "Policeman Colby (Tim Franklin) has steamed up the screen with the local nurse in recent episodes of the show." They branded Colby and Jasmine a "photogenic couple", who had "our full attention." Following Chelsea's introduction, Radio Times critic Johnathon Hughes noted, "It's obvious there's still an attraction between the boy and girl in blue, but can they pick up where they left off with all that emotional baggage? And is it ever a good idea to mix business with pleasure...?" Tamara Cullen, writing for TV Week, said "Chelsea's decision to transfer to Summer Bay's police force in a bid to win Colby back initially caused him headaches both personally and professionally."
