= Jasmine Delaney =

Fictional character

- Home and Away character
- Portrayed by: Sam Frost
- Duration: 2017–2022
- First appearance: 18 December 2017
- Last appearance: 9 June 2022
- Introduced by: Lucy Addario
In-universe information
- Occupation: Nurse; Gym Owner
- Father: Alexander Delaney
- Half-brothers: Xander Delaney
- Husband: Robbo (2019–2020)
- Stepdaughters: Grace Morgan

Jasmine Delaney is a fictional character from the Australian television soap opera Home and Away, played by Sam Frost. Frost was asked to audition for the serial while she was competing on Hell's Kitchen Australia. After seeing that she was up against several actresses, Frost did not think she would be successful. Following a second audition, Frost was told she had won the role. Frost had no prior acting experience and she began working with an acting coach. She filmed her first scenes in August 2017, and she made her first appearance during the season finale broadcast on 18 December 2017. Jasmine's introductory scenes see her involved in a car crash, which kills Kat Chapman (Pia Miller).

Jasmine is portrayed as a naive, trusting, kind "spirited Aussie girl". As the character was introduced alone, producers gave her a connection to the community through Leah Patterson (Ada Nicodemou), who Jasmine quickly befriends. The character's first storyline saw the arrival of her abusive former boyfriend David (Jack Ellis), who has been stalking her. David's presence scares Jasmine and when he loses his temper, he holds her and Leah hostage. Frost said the storyline was challenging for her. Later storylines have focused on Jasmine's romantic relationships with Mason Morgan (Orpheus Pledger), Colby Thorne (Tim Franklin) and Robbo (Jake Ryan), whom she later married.

Frost's casting attracted criticism from individuals in the acting community, but she was defended by current and former Home and Away stars. She also received death threats on social media from fans who were unhappy that her character was involved in Kat's death. Frost later received a nomination for the Logie Award for Most Popular New Talent for the role. In December 2021, Frost's exit from the serial was confirmed by Channel 7 and she filmed her final scenes that same month. Her final scenes as Jasmine aired on 9 June 2022.

== Casting ==
On 17 July 2017, Karlie Rutherford of The Daily Telegraph reported that television personality Sam Frost had been cast in Home and Away. Frost, who had no prior acting experience, was asked to audition for the show while she was a contestant on Hell's Kitchen Australia, which airs on the same network. Frost auditioned alongside several actresses, which made her believe that she would not be successful. However, following a second audition, Frost was told she had secured the role. Julie McGauran, the head of drama at Seven Network, stated that Frost has a "natural ease in front of the camera", which makes her a "wonderful" addition to the cast. Frost commented, "I grew up watching Home and Away and never in my wildest dreams did I think I would be on set and part of the cast." Frost later revealed that she had auditioned for the show before, but failed to win the role. She began working with an acting coach ahead of her debut, and she filmed her first scenes at Palm Beach, the show's outdoor filming location, in early August.

== Development ==
=== Characterisation ===
Jasmine is characterised as "a spirited Aussie girl with a zest for life and a big heart." She is initially "quite guarded" and anxious, as she hides a "dark past". Frost also called her "quite a troubled soul". Frost found Jasmine to be a likeable character, and said she would not "step on anyone's toes" or become a villain. She described Jasmine as a "typical Australian girl" who loves the outdoors and the beach, but she is also naive and her trust in people can get her into trouble. She also said that even when people are doing the wrong thing, Jasmine will still see good in them. Frost hoped those qualities would make Jasmine relatable to viewers. Frost also found that she related to Jasmine, saying that she was reminded of herself when she was in her early twenties. As Jasmine settles into Summer Bay, she grows in confidence. Frost added that as her character "finds her feet a little bit" everyone would love her.

=== Introduction ===
Jasmine was introduced during the 2017 finale episode, broadcast on 18 December. Jasmine is driving towards Summer Bay when she is involved in a car crash with Kat Chapman (Pia Miller), who later dies along with her unborn child. Frost filmed her character's introductory scenes in Penrith in early August. Frost recalled that it was a cold and rainy night, but she felt "blessed" to be part of the show. Jasmine was in an induced coma when the series resumed in January 2018. Frost told Seanna Cronin, "Jasmine enters the Bay in tremendous style in a car accident. I'm in a coma for a while (as Jasmine), which was good because I got to learn how the set works and get to know the people who are working around me... plus I'm really good at sleeping."

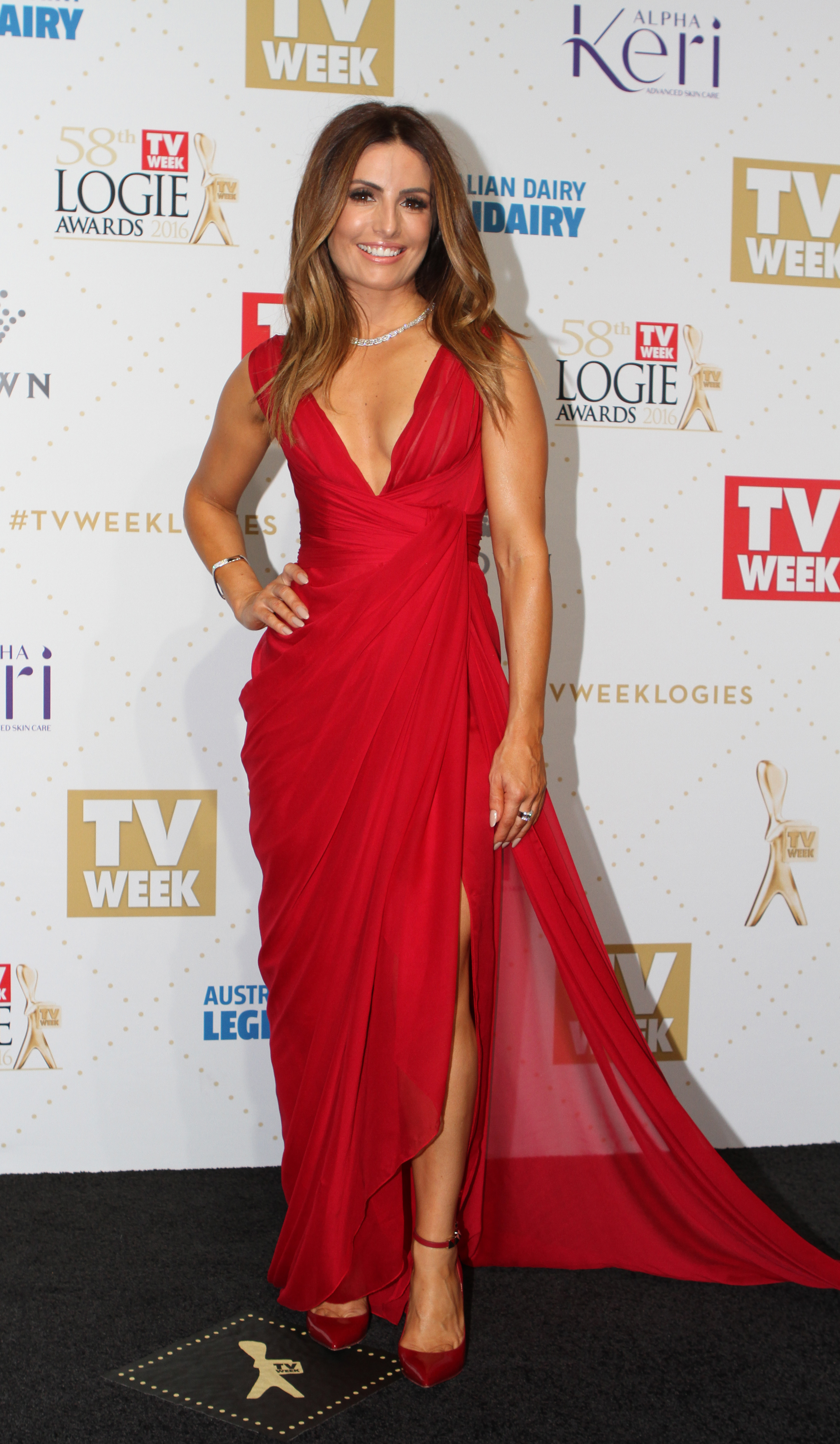
Jasmine befriends Leah Patterson, played by Ada Nicodemou (pictured).

As Frost's character was introduced by herself, she was given an immediate connection to the Bay through Leah Patterson (Ada Nicodemou), who sits by Jasmine's hospital bed when she learns that she has no family. When Jasmine is woken up from her coma, she thrashes around as she is confused and scared. Frost commented that even though she had never acted before, she was immediately given a "dramatic entrance". After learning that Jasmine has discharged herself, Leah finds her wandering around the Bay and takes her to the Pier Diner. There, Leah explains that Kat's death was not Jasmine's fault. Frost said Jasmine is quite anxious and shows "a lot of depth and darkness" in her first scenes. Frost found that she was able to empathise with her character, and used her own experiences with mental health issues to help her during filming.

=== Stalking case ===
Jasmine was said to be hiding "a sad secret" upon her arrival in the Bay. During their conversation at the Pier Diner, Leah realises that Jasmine is running from something. Jasmine eventually reveals that she is being stalked by an abusive former boyfriend. Frost commented, "She realises she can trust Leah and it becomes one of the most important friendships she makes in the Bay. They're baby steps, but people begin to understand why she's the way she is. It's an interesting journey." Jasmine explains that she initially thought David (Jack Ellis) was a nice man, but he soon began stalking her. On the night of the car accident, David tried to grab her outside of a gym, but she managed to get into her car and drove away.

Jasmine continues to live in fear of David, and she takes out a restraining order against him. However, that leads David straight to Summer Bay. When Jasmine returns to her caravan, she finds David waiting inside and she fears for her life. David does not notice that she is scared and instead begs her to rekindle their relationship. A show spokesperson stated that when David notices Jasmine with her phone "his true colours come through" and he threatens her. David then insists that they leave the Bay together, but Jasmine stalls him by going up to Summer Bay House to hand in her caravan keys. Leah recognises David from Jasmine's description and invites them to lunch.

David soon realises that Leah knows who he is and holds both women hostage, along with Ryder Jackson (Lukas Radovich) who returns home at the wrong time. David takes away their phones, and Frost said that Jasmine is terrified. She continued, "She knows David is not messing around and has lost his temper. She's afraid of what he might do. He's already broken the rules of his restraining order – so who knows what's next?" As evening falls, Leah persuades David to let her order a pizza from Salt and she places an SOS message in the comments box, which is seen by Salt's owner Brody Morgan (Jackson Heywood). He sends Constable Colby Thorne (Tim Franklin) to the house, where he apprehends David. Frost later said the storyline was "really challenging."

=== Early relationships ===
==== Mason Morgan ====
In an April 2018 interview with Sarah Ellis of Inside Soap, Frost confirmed that her character would find some romance in the Bay. Jasmine forms a connection with Mason Morgan (Orpheus Pledger) and inspires him to return to his medical studies, after she secures a nursing position at the local hospital. Pledger explained that Jasmine is the first woman Mason has been attracted to since his former girlfriend died. They develop a rapport, as they share similar interests and professions. Jasmine is a bit older than Mason and has also gone through some issues in her own life. Pledger thought there was chemistry between their characters, and called their relationship "fun and romantic in every sense." He also hoped it would encourage Mason to get into "a good headspace" again. Mason invites Jasmine to accompany him to a party and she accepts, but she later admits to Leah that she does not see it as a date. Mason is later forced to cancel their plans when he has to work late. Producers formed a love triangle between Mason, Jasmine and Colby Thorne (Franklin). Mason's sister Tori Morgan (Penny McNamee) realises that he has a crush on Jasmine and encourages him to act on his feelings. Mason goes to Jasmine's home to ask her out on another date, but he is unsuccessful.

==== Colby Thorne ====
Producers soon paired Jasmine with local police constable Colby Thorne. After being stood up by Mason Morgan, Jasmine spends the afternoon bonding with Colby at Salt. At the end of their evening, they share "an unexpected kiss" while saying goodbye. Colby and Jasmine later have sex, but Colby insists that it was a one-off and nothing more can happen between them. However, Colby develops feelings for Jasmine. He tells her that he does not want to form a relationship as he is searching for his sister and his mother, and would have to leave everything behind if he got a lead on their location. Jasmine supports Colby in his search for his family, and she soon questions whether there is more to their friendship. Irene Roberts (Lynne McGranger) notices an "obvious spark" between the couple and points it out to Jasmine, who feels the same. Frost commented, "There was always an attraction with Colby, beyond just friendship. But now that things have changed between them, Jasmine feels lucky to have him in her life."

Franklin added that Colby worries about Jasmine's safety, as he carries out his search. He also makes it clear that he does not have enough time to devote to a relationship. Colby and Jasmine later agree to have a casual relationship, which is soon threatened by Ebony Harding (Cariba Heine), who is trying to get revenge on Colby for shooting her brother. Ebony tries to manipulate the couple into breaking up. Speaking to a TV Week writer, Frost commented "Jasmine has her suspicions about Ebony after finding her and Colby drinking at Salt." Jasmine accuses Colby of flirting with Ebony, which leaves him feeling insulted and puts a strain on their relationship. As Colby and Jasmine meet up for a date at Salt, Ebony appears and Jasmine invites her to join them. She soon grows jealous of Ebony's flirting, which irritates Colby and he and Jasmine fight. When Colby later learns that Jasmine has told Leah about his involvement with The River Boys, he ends their relationship.

=== Relationship with Robbo ===
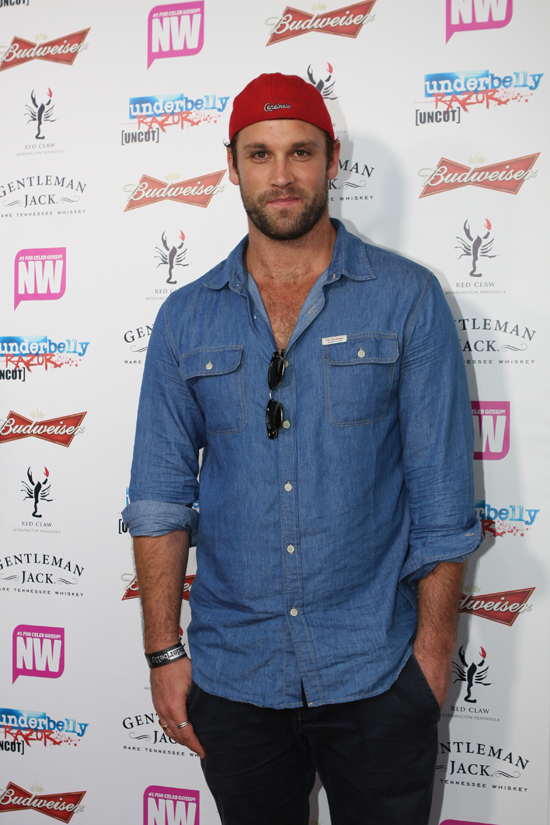
Robbo (played by Jake Ryan), develops romantic feelings for Jasmine after she helps him to settle into the Bay.

In August 2018, producers established a relationship between Jasmine and Colby's housemate Robbo (Jake Ryan). The characters begin spending time together as Jasmine helps Robbo to integrate himself into the Bay. After learning that Robbo has accepted a job with Alf Stewart (Ray Meagher), Jasmine expresses her happiness for him through some "cheeky banter". Jackie Brygel of New Idea observed that Robbo appeared to be developing romantic feelings for Jasmine, and Ryan told her, "I think it's quite an unexpected but welcome friendship that's developed between Robbo and Jasmine. He doesn't tend to trust many people, but Jasmine's positivity and zest for life are just what Robbo needs. He's been quite shut off from other people." Irene notices how Robbo and Jasmine have been spending together, but Jasmine insists that they are just friends. Robbo later invites Jasmine out to dinner to thank her for her help, and Ryan commented that it does not start out as a romantic date. However, Robbo appears to be enjoying his time with Jasmine and he is able to open up to her about his past. Ryan said that up until that point, his character had not been looking for another romantic relationship. Robbo struggles with his feelings towards Jasmine and tries to avoid her. Ryan explained, "He didn't really want to explore his feelings for Jasmine and go down that path, because he didn't think they were reciprocal."

After Robbo purchases the local gym, he is thankful for Jasmine's encouragement and his feelings for her become stronger. However, Jasmine reiterates that she just wants to be friends. Brygel wondered if she was trying to trick herself. Jasmine eventually realises that she has romantic feelings for Robbo. Frost told Brygel that it was "challenging" for Jasmine, adding "When Robbo first told Jas that he had feelings for her, she was scared to tell him how she felt. She has had a bit of a bad run in relationships and I think she was worried about rejection." Jasmine confides in Tori, who encourages her to speak to Robbo before they go ahead with their plan to have a child via IVF together. The situation tests Jasmine and Robbo's relationship from the start. Tori gives Robbo a chance to step away, as she knows that he can have children with Jasmine without IVF. Robbo tells Jasmine that he is going to honour his agreement with Tori. Tori and Robbo go through with the IVF cycle, but Tori miscarries and Robbo decides that he does not want to try again. Frost thought Jasmine had "been on a journey" throughout the dramatic storyline and said it was "tough" for her character.

Robbo and Jasmine become engaged in the 2018 season finale, after Robbo proposes at the wedding reception of Colby and Chelsea Campbell (Ashleigh Brewer). Jasmine later learns Tori is pregnant after going against Robbo's wishes and having the second embryo implanted. Frost said Jasmine knew Tori was "hung up" on Robbo's rejection, so she has been understanding of her situation. Frost continued: "But as Tori's awkwardness grew and she came down with a 'stomach bug', a red flag went up. She's angry and hurt." Tori asks Jasmine not to say anything to Robbo as she needs time. Frost explained that Jasmine is angry that Tori went against Robbo's wishes and she wants to tell him immediately, but she decides to hold off out of guilt and for her friendship with Tori, which leaves her subdued around Robbo. Frost quipped that it was not the way Jasmine wanted to start a life with Robbo. Frost worked closely with McNamee on the storyline and asked her for advice, saying "We wanted them to be mature and tell their truths, because people can empathise with characters and the situation." Jasmine later gives Tori an ultimatum to tell Robbo or she will. When Robbo learns the truth about Tori's pregnancy and that Jasmine knew, he breaks off the engagement and leaves town. The development allowed Ryan to make a temporary departure to film a lead role in feature film Savage. A "heartbroken and angry" Jasmine eventually accepts that Robbo is not returning and tries to move on with her life.

A few months later, during Tori's first ultrasound scan, Robbo returns to the Bay. Ryan called his character "quite selfish" and said "he thought that once he had his time out, he would have been able to come back. But he had no idea of the damage he left behind." Jasmine leaves, but Robbo catches up to her and tries to justify his departure and silence. However, it becomes clear their relationship is over. Robbo turns to Colby for advice and he explains how much Jasmine struggled with Robbo's absence. Ryan commented that Robbo had not "really envisaged that Jasmine would be going through such a tough time." Jasmine later joins her friends for a night out and shares a kiss with Colby. Robbo's attempts to make amends with Jasmine affect her mental health and she ends up suffering a panic attack. Frost thought Jasmine was in shock over Robbo's reappearance, pointing out that she was "a mess and completely broken when he suddenly left. Robbo didn't call or text in over six weeks, – I think Jas is understandably confused." Jasmine is adamant that the relationship between herself and Robbo is over. Frost believed Jasmine needed to learn how to trust Robbo again if they were to reconcile. Robbo's presence heightens Jasmine's anxiety and when they meet to talk, she is "lost for words." Frost told Alice Penwill of Inside Soap: Anyone who's been dumped knows that sick feeling when you catch up with an ex-partner. Added to that is an underlying past trauma, which rises to the surface." After meeting Robbo, Jasmine meets Colby, who tells her there is a photo of their kiss. When Robbo comes to see Jasmine at home, she locks herself in her bedroom and struggles to breathe. Frost confirmed that the panic attack is brought on by "an overwhelming sense of anxiety." Jasmine is unsure how to manage everything and Frost thought she did not fully understand what is happening, but knows she needs help. Tori later comes to her aid.

Jasmine struggles to cope with Robbo being around. He sends her daily messages to show how much he cares for her, but Jasmine makes it clear she wants nothing more to do with him. While she is out running, Robbo meets her and runs alongside her until she hears him out. His presence is too much for Jasmine and she passes out on the beach. Robbo takes Jasmine to the Diner to recover, but leaves after realising he is making her anxiety worse. Ryan commented "It really upsets him to see the effect he's had on her." Jasmine blames the collapse on overexertion and lack of food, before she snaps at Tori and says it is all her fault. Irene later suggests that Jasmine still loves Robbo and encourages her to speak with him. Jasmine is "overwhelmed" by the occasion and admits that Robbo was not the first person to abandon her. She later explains that her mother died when she was young, and then her father disappeared, leaving her alone. Robbo realises that his own disappearance caused her abandonment issues to surface. Ryan said "He's gutted to see how distraught she is and the effect he's had on her."

=== Introduction of half-siblings ===
In March 2022, it was confirmed that the show was introducing two family members for Jasmine. Jasmine learns that her estranged father had "a secret other life" and that she has two half-siblings Xander Delaney (Luke Van Os) and Rose Delaney (Kirsty Marillier), however, she initially dismisses them as "scam artists". Her partner Cash Newman (Nicholas Cartwright) soon discovers that their stories check out.

=== Departure ===
On 17 December 2021, Channel 7 announced that Frost had decided to leave the serial. The network stated "We support and respect Sam's decision to leave Home and Away. Sam leaves with our sincere thanks and very best wishes for the future." Frost filmed her final scenes during the same week as her departure announcement. She had previously confirmed that she would be written out of the show temporarily, as she undergoes a medical procedure in January 2022. In February 2022, Frost explained on her Instagram account that she chose to leave her "dream job" at Home and Away to focus on her family, friends and mental health. Frost admitted to having some worries about income and work since leaving the show, but thought it was vital to take some time out.

Frost's final scenes aired on 9 June 2022. Jasmine informs Alf and Marilyn Chambers (Emily Symons) that Robbo's mother has had a heart attack, and she will be going to the farm to help out. Later, she tells Rose of her "disappointment" that she is going just as they are finally getting to know each other. She also shares a goodbye scene with Cash, but not her brother Xander.

== Reception ==
=== Casting criticism ===
Frost's casting proved divisive within the acting community, with some dubbing it a publicity stunt. Hannah Davies of The Courier-Mail reported that several actors had criticised Frost's casting. Some called it "an insult to trained actors", while another thought it had made "a mockery" of the industry. The artistic director of the Australian Acting Academy, Brendan Glanville admitted that he was "disappointed" by the casting, saying "To me it demonstrates that Home and Away has lost faith in its writers if directors are resorting to this kind of stunt, rather than using their storylines to pull viewers. I can't comment on Sam Frost's acting because some people have a natural ability, but this is a non-artistic choice that is disappointing."

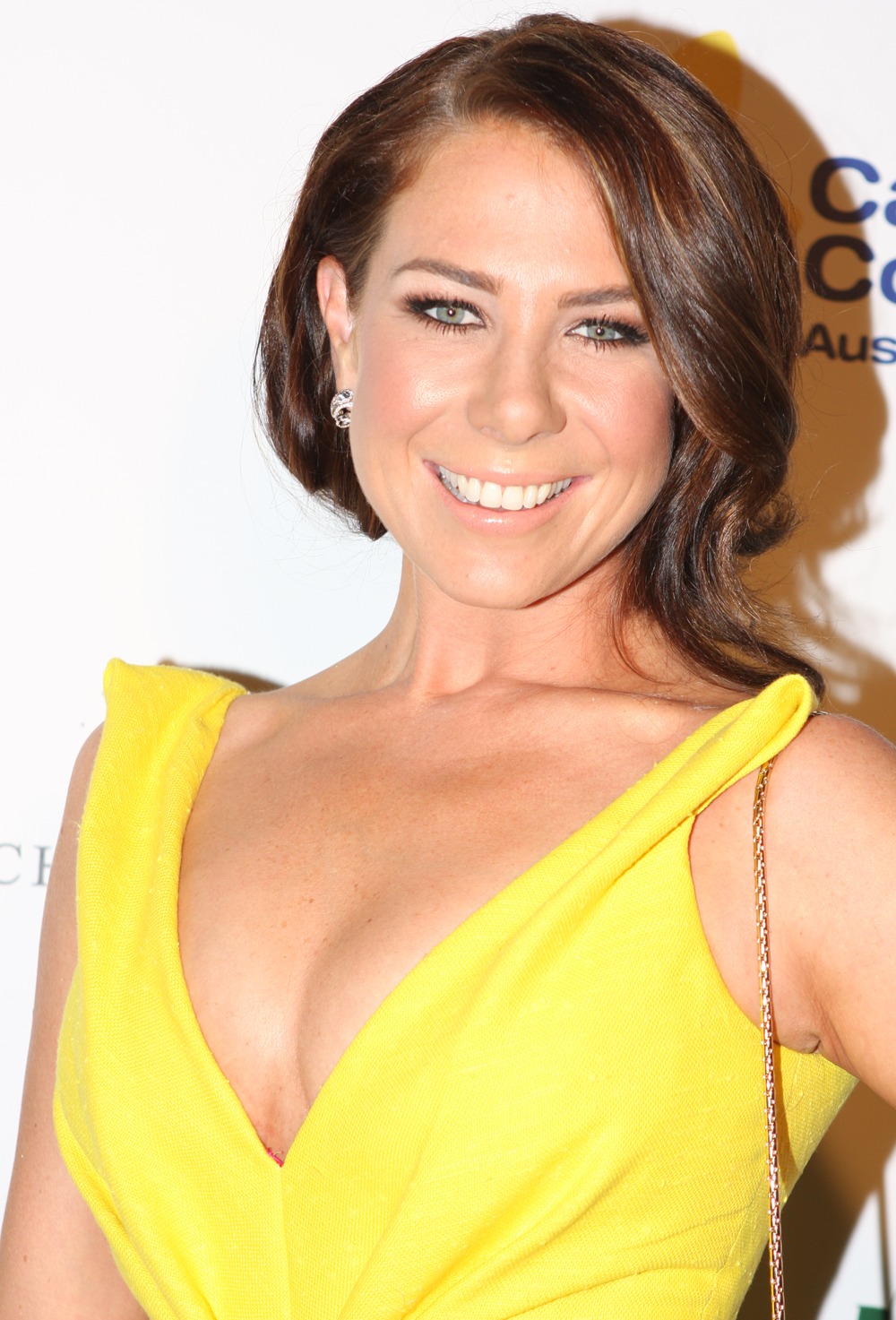
Former Home and Away actress Kate Ritchie defended Frost's casting after she received much criticism.

A spokesperson for Network Seven said Frost has secured the role of the strength of her audition. Frost was defended by former Home and Away actress Debra Lawrance (Pippa Ross), who called her "a natural performer" and stated that it was "ridiculous" to criticise her lack of training, as she would learn on the job like many actresses before her. Kate Ritchie, who played Sally Fletcher, also came to Frost's defence, saying "There have been a lot of people who have joined that show without any training. What's everyone meant to do? Turn down opportunities because they're worried about what everyone is going to think of it?" Frost's new co-stars, including James Stewart and Ada Nicodemou, also came out in support of her casting.

=== Critical analysis ===
Ahead of her arrival, the show's official website at Yahoo7 included Jasmine's debut in their review of the 2018 season trailer titled "15 photos that have us wanting more in 2018!" Lorna Gray of Women's Day commented "we’re beyond excited to see what her new character will bring to The Bay… we’re hoping it involves shaking things up with a new love interest…" Chloe Lal writing for Bauer Media's Now To Love website listed five reasons why Frost was exactly what Home and Away needed and concluded by saying "we're going to bet that she'll very quickly become a Summer Bay fan favourite." Jessica Clark of website Mamamia reviewed the character's debut episode and said that Frost had "a 35 whole seconds of shut-eyed screen time" and joked, "to be fair, we never knew Sam could play an unconscious person so convincingly." Frost received death threats on social media following the broadcast of her first scenes, as fans blamed her for the death of their favourite character, Kat. Frost admitted that she was shocked by the reaction. After reporting the threats to Seven, she saw a psychologist and had to have her social media accounts moderated.

In April 2018, Alicia Vrajlal of Yahoo7 Be observed that Frost "has quickly become a fan favourite". The following month, Frost received a nomination for the Logie Award for Most Popular New Talent for her portrayal of Jasmine. Inside Soap's Sarah Ellis noted, "Jasmine Delaney's first few weeks in the Bay haven't exactly been a barrel of laughs, but things start to look up this week as she strikes up a lovely friendship with Mason." A reporter for TV Week commented, "Jasmine has caused quite a stir since she arrived in Summer Bay – no more so than among two of the bay's most eligible bachelors: Mason and Colby." Tamara Cullen of the same publication observed, "Since her arrival in Summer Bay, Jasmine has attracted plenty of suitors. But no-one is yet to win her heart."

Cullen later wrote that Jasmine and Robbo were an "unlikely pair", but they had formed the show's "hot new romance". She also branded Jasmine a "bubbly nurse". A reporter for the Coventry Evening Telegraph thought the chemistry between the couple "has been palpable for some time, and it seemed as if it was only a matter of waiting before the photogenic duo became a couple." The reporter also questioned "will the pair ever get together, or is their will-they-won't-they relationship set to run for a while yet?" Cullen later dubbed them "the odd couple" and observed that they "have endured grief, heartache and even a sperm donor request together. But in the face of it all, their love hasn't wavered."

In July 2020, Frost began receiving abusive comments online after her character attempted to gain custody of Grace. She was forced to remind the show's fans that it was a storyline and she is playing a character. As Jasmine's grief story played out, a Liverpool Echo reported noted "All eyes are on Jasmine again, and given the fact she has more ups and downs than a rollercoaster, there's little wonder."

In November 2021, three critics for The West Australian placed Jasmine in eleventh place in their feature on the "Top 50 heroes we love and villains we hate" from Home and Away. They praised the character, stating: "Jasmine's been through the wringer since joining the cast in 2017. Her husband was killed off, she grappled with depression, and became obsessed with having a baby to the point she even plotted to steal one. Even with all that going on, she's remarkably loveable."
