= Mason Morgan =

- Home and Away character
- Portrayed by: Orpheus Pledger
- Duration: 2016–2019
- First appearance: 7 June 2016
- Last appearance: 27 November 2019
- Introduced by: Lucy Addario
In-universe information
- Other names: Michael Lee (birth name)
- Occupation: Medical student; Waiter; Lifeguard; Gym co-manager; Doctor
- Father: Koby Lee
- Mother: Kate Lee
- Brothers: Justin Morgan; Brody Morgan
- Sisters: Tori Morgan
- Half-sisters: Raffy Morrison
- Nieces: Ava Gilbert; Grace Morgan

Mason Morgan is a fictional character from the Australian soap opera Home and Away, played by Orpheus Pledger. The actor relocated to Sydney from Melbourne upon being offered the role. He began filming his first scenes in early December 2015. Pledger made his first appearance as Mason during the episode broadcast on 7 June 2016.

Mason was introduced to the show along with his three older siblings; Tori Morgan (Penny McNamee), Justin Morgan (James Stewart) and Brody Morgan (Jackson Heywood). Mason is portrayed as being a positive, family orientated "free spirit". He is studying to be a doctor like his sister, who he shares a close bond with. For the first few weeks after their arrival, Mason and his siblings concealed the fact that they were in witness protection. Mason was the first member of the family to reveal the secret, which resulted in them being held hostage.

Subsequent storylines for Mason have revolved around his romantic relationships with Evelyn MacGuire (Phillipa Northeast), Olivia Fraser Richards (Raechelle Banno), and Beth Ellis (Anneliese Apps), with the latter helping to bring awareness to organ donation in Australia. The character has also been used to show the effects of temporary paralysis, after he is injured in a car crash with his brother Brody. During the 2019 season finale, Mason is shot dead in a hospital siege.

== Casting ==
On 5 December 2015, Jonathon Moran from The Daily Telegraph reported actors Orpheus Pledger, Jackson Heywood and James Stewart had joined the cast of Home and Away as brothers Mason, Brody and Justin Morgan respectively. The family drew immediate comparisons to the show's Braxton brothers, who were introduced to the show in 2011. All three actors began filming their first scenes during the following week, ahead of their on-screen debut in 2016. Pledger was living with his mother and brother in Melbourne when he was offered the role of Mason, which required him to move to Sydney, where the show's studios are located. Pledger said his 2011 role as Noah Parkin on fellow Australian soap opera Neighbours helped him prepare for the workload and the pace of filming. Pledger made his first appearance on 7 June 2016, alongside Heywood and Stewart.

== Development ==
=== Characterisation and introduction ===
Ahead of his screen debut, Pledger described Mason as having a "positive outlook on life", being family orientated, and "a hopeless romantic". He also said Mason "leads with his gut and stands up for what he believes in and will always stick up for the little guy." Pledger later called his character "a free spirit" and a positive person to be around. The actor explained that following the death of their parents, Mason's siblings helped him to grow up and unlike them, Mason has not had to take on many responsibilities. Of the comparisons to the Braxton brothers, Heywood said the Morgans had a different dynamic, while Pledger added that family comes first for the Morgans. Mason is a medical student, who struggles to fit in a social life in between studying and working out in the gym. Pledger called Tori a good role model for Mason and as a result, they share a very close relationship.

Pledger shares some similarities with Mason, particularly his dedication to attaining his dream job. The actor explained, "I've done that in my life with acting. Maybe it's not the same formality as studying to be a doctor and having to do a seven-year introduction to it before you even start but, definitely, if I was passionate about it, I would definitely do it." The character's appearance changed in 2017 when Pledger shaved his "trademark" curly hair in favour of a shorter haircut. Pledger later said that he thought a shorter haircut was best for his character at that point, but that he was beginning to grow it longer for Mason again.

Mason, Justin and Brody, along with their dog Buddy, are almost involved in a car crash with Martin "Ash" Ashford (George Mason) while they are driving to Summer Bay to join their sister, Tori. Ash swerves across the road in front of them while texting. After coming to a stop, Justin immediately gets out of the car to confront Ash, and Brody and Mason desperately try to keep them from getting into a physical fight. The Morgans continue their journey to the Bay, where they find Ash talking with Tori and Alf Stewart (Ray Meagher) on the beach and another fight almost breaks out, until Tori reveals that Justin, Brody and Mason are her brothers. Ash accepts that he was in the wrong, while Justin is glad his family have made it to the Bay safely. The siblings also wonder if they will be able to stay in their new home, leading to the start of their first major storyline.

=== Witness protection ===
An Inside Soap columnist observed that the Morgans had been hiding something about their past from the Bay's residents. They initially keep to themselves and Justin warns Tori against befriending local doctor Nate Cooper (Kyle Pryor). Stewart explained that there were a set of rules that the Morgans had to live by, which related to their secret. While studying at home one day, Mason is visited by his former girlfriend Lara Adams (Elle Harris). Lara tells Mason off for not staying in contact with her. Justin arrives home shortly after and finds Lara and Mason together. He orders Lara to leave, while warning Mason that he has compromised the family. Stewart confirmed that Justin's reaction had something to do with the family's secret. Lara comes to the hospital to see Mason, who asks her to leave in case she is seen. Later, while he is looking for Lara, Mason comes across an upset Evelyn MacGuire (Philippa Northeast) and he comforts her. Lara sees them together and assumes Mason is also dating Evie. In an effort to reconnect with Lara, Mason tells her that his family are in witness protection. Later that day, Brody mentions that he is being followed, so Mason admits that he told Lara about their secret. Justin decides that they need to pack up and leave.

After Tori is threatened by Spike Lowe (Jason Montgomery), the family's police liaison officer Atticus Decker (John Adam) has them moved to a safe house. As they wait to find out where they will be moved to next, the family agree that they are tired of running from the people who killed their parents. When his siblings begin arguing, Mason slips outside to meet up with Lara. However, he soon learns that she is working for Spike and Blaine Varden (Ashley Lyons), the man who killed the Morgan's parents. Spike and Blaine trick Mason into telling them where the safe house is and they hold the family hostage. Blaine produces a gun and threatens to kill them all, before revealing that Justin knew the truth about the circumstances that led to their parents' deaths. Mason is one of nine characters involved in a plane crash, after Spike sabotages a plane being used for Tori's birthday trip. Justin attempts to warn the pilot, Duncan Stewart (Benedict Wall), but a broken pipe leaks carbon dioxide into the cabin and everyone passes out. However, Duncan does manage to crash land the plane in the sand first. While most of the passengers escape major injury, Mason is "panic-stricken" when he realises that Brody is missing.

Later developments in the storyline saw the Morgans meet Decker's nieces Hope (Jessica Falkholt) and Raffy Morrison (Olivia Deeble). They soon realise that Raffy could be their half-sister, after Decker admits to having an affair with their mother. A DNA test confirms their suspicions, but before they tell Raffy, Hope steals Mason's car and attempts to leave town with her. The Morgans eventually tell Raffy she is their half-sister and that they had to go into witness protection because their parents were killed by drug dealers. The Morgan's secret is soon revealed to the rest of the Bay in the local newspaper.

=== Relationships ===
==== Evelyn MacGuire ====
Mason shares a drunken kiss with Evie after a night out. The following week, they have dinner together and Mason confronts Evie about her drinking and partying. However, instead of talking to him about her issues, Evie just kisses Mason again and they have sex. They agree to a friends with benefits arrangement. Mason becomes concerned when Evie insists that she survived the plane crash because her deceased brother Oscar MacGuire (Jake Speer) is watching over her. Determined to prove her theory, Evie takes Mason out in her car and begins driving recklessly, as she is convinced that she will not crash. Mason is "petrified" by her stunt and when they stop, he "lets rip at her". Mason eventually develops feelings for Evie, but she reacts angrily to his admission and tells him she is not interested in a relationship with him. A reporter for The Daily Telegraph noted the arrangement would not last long, after Northeast was photographed filming a kissing scene with Alec Snow, who plays Matt Page.

==== Olivia Fraser Richards ====
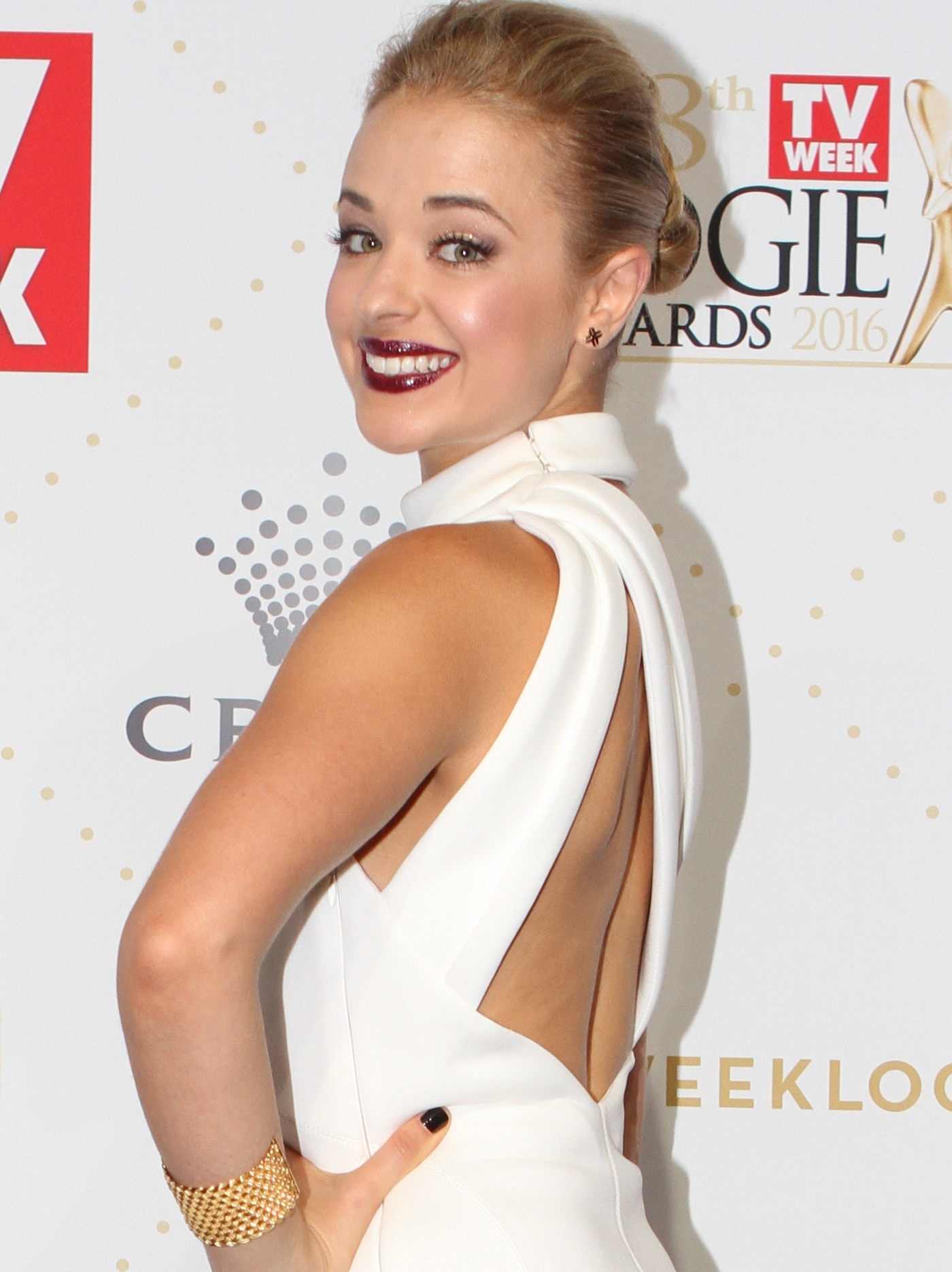
Mason is involved in a love triangle when he dates Olivia Fraser Richards, played by Raechelle Banno (pictured).

Producers later paired Mason with Olivia Fraser Richards (Raechelle Banno) and formed a love triangle storyline with her ex-boyfriend Hunter King (Scott Lee). Mason shows an interest in dating Olivia and she is "drawn to him". Pledger told Alison Gardner of What's on TV that Mason "really likes" Olivia and readily accepts her invitation to accompany her to the formal. The pair soon learn that Hunter is also attending, and Mason realises that Olivia still has feelings for him. Olivia leaves Mason at the bar and begins dancing with Hunter, but she explains that she was just passing the time while she waited for Mason to return. Pledger continued, "As the evening goes on, it's clear Olivia's still into Hunter. Mason's had so much to deal with because of his family's problems that he doesn't need Olivia to bring him even more heartache." The following morning, Olivia visits Mason at the lifeguard station, where he is starting his new job, to tell him that what happened with Hunter meant nothing, but Mason replies that he does not need any more stress in his life. Later that day, Mason gets into a fight with Hunter. Pledger said that Mason "acts completely out of character" when he hits Hunter and is left feeling ashamed after Alf breaks up the fight.

Olivia asks Mason if they can start their relationship over, but Mason rejects the idea. However, when they attend the Summer Grooves music festival, Mason and Olivia kiss. Olivia later admits to Mason that she is worried about Hunter's decision not to return to school and he attempts to talk to Hunter, as he is annoyed that she is worrying about him all the time. The pair have to separated by Alf again, and Lee commented that while Hunter does not have a friendship with Mason, he wants to get better at dealing with things. Mason and Olivia are soon caught having sex at the Summer Bay Auto garage by Brody and Irene Roberts (Lynne McGranger). When Mason comes to The Diner to help Olivia out, he notices she is acting strangely. He soon learns from Alf that Hunter helped Olivia at The Diner the night before, leaving Olivia feeling guilty she did not tell Mason herself. Mason then confronts Hunter and asks him if he wants to get back together with Olivia, but Hunter says no. Mason and Olivia's relationship becomes strained as he worries that she still has feelings for Hunter, and when she admits that he is right, but wants to still date him, Mason breaks up with her.

==== Beth Ellis ====
A new love interest for Mason was introduced in the form of guest character Beth Ellis (Anneliese Apps) in August 2017. Beth tells Mason that she is a nurse and they soon bond while he is a patient in the hospital. Beth's friendship helps Mason's recovery from injuries he sustained in a car crash. While looking for Beth, Mason soon learns that she is actually a patient. Mason is "furious" that Beth has lied to him, but she soon reveals that she is dying. Beth explains that she needs a heart transplant, after being diagnosed with a serious heart condition five years prior. Mason urges Beth not to give up hope that she will get the transplant and they share "a heartfelt moment", which led a New Idea columnist to speculate that they could be more than just friends. Mason later asks Beth out on a date and she accepts. Of their romance, Pledger told Tamara Cullen of TV Week, "Beth brings out the best in Mason. He's playful and has no inhibitions with her." When Mason finds Beth's bucket list, she tells him that she accepts that she is not getting any better and is starting to reconsider her treatment. When Mason tries to reassure her that she will be fine, Beth gets angry and Mason is forced to apologise. He then surprises her with a champagne lunch, where they bond further and kiss. Pledger commented, "Mason has never had a connection with anyone else like this."

Mason finds Beth's bucket list and sees that she has fun and "romantically charged" things on it, which Mason wants to help her complete. Mason comes up with the idea of a James Bond style trip to the casino. During the journey, Beth passes out while she driving. Mason is "petrified" and worried about the harm to Beth's health. He is also left feeling helpless as he cannot do anything about her condition. Mason asks to meets Beth's parents, but she is reluctant. However, Mason later meets Beth and her father Alan Ellis (Blair McDonough) at the beach, so he introduces himself. Alan is unaware that his daughter is dating anyone, but he invites Mason to lunch with Beth and her mother Jackie (Rachael Coopes), where Mason tries to make a good impression. Both Apps and Pledger hoped Beth and Mason's storyline would raise more awareness about organ donation in Australia. Pledger also thought the plot could increase the number of people willing to be organ donors. Both actors found the storyline tough to film, with Pledger calling it "a harrowing experience". The storyline concludes with Beth's death. Mason wants to make the most of the time they have left and organises a lunch on the beach. But Beth collapses and Mason rushes her to the hospital, where she tells him she loves him. Beth goes into cardiac arrest and dies.

=== Paralysis ===
Mason becomes a victim of his brother Brody's drug addiction when they are in a car crash together, which leaves him with temporary paralysis. The storyline begins when Mason finds Brody searching through the bin for drugs, as he is suffering a relapse. Mason knows that Brody needs help, so he manages to get Brody into his car to drive him to rehab. During the journey, Brody is convinced that his dealer William Zannis (Caleb Alloway) is following them. He suddenly grabs the wheel, causing the car to leave the road and crash. Brody suffers minor injuries, but Mason's condition deteriorates and he is placed in a coma after he loses the feeling in his hand. Tori is forced to tell Brody, Justin and Raffy that Mason may never walk again, as he has severe spinal damage. The diagnosis prompts Brody to sell his restaurant and leave town for a private rehab. Weeks later, Tori prepares to take Mason off the ventilator and wake him up, so she can assess how much damage there is to his spinal cord. But Mason fails to wake up and a neurosurgeon informs Tori that they will need to wait until the spinal shock has worn off.

Days later, Mason finally wakes and is able to tell Tori that he cannot feel his legs. As he fears that he may never be able to walk again, Mason undergoes a series of tests and is told that once the swelling goes down, he may regain some feeling back. After Mason is discharged from the hospital, Brody attempts to apologise for causing the accident. Mason "erupts with fury" and attempts to strangle his brother. Justin and Tori try to get the brothers to reconcile, but they struggle to get through to "an increasingly-bitter" Mason. Justin later takes Mason to see their parents' graves to remind him that the family needs to stay together. Mason then accepts Brody's handshake, ending their feud. Pledger later posted a photo of himself walking around the outdoor set on his social media, confirming that Mason would recover from his paralysis.

=== Departure ===
During the serial's season finale, broadcast on 27 November 2019, the character was killed off after being shot by a member of the Ouroboros gang, who had taken several characters hostage in the hospital. In an interview with TV Week, Pledger confirmed that his departure was a joint decision between himself and the producers, saying "it was a creative decision because it benefits the show the most at this time. And it gave me a bit of time to prepare for a lot of things as well, so there was no stress. I mean it was just so good." Speaking about his final scenes, Pledger called Mason "heroic" and compared his death to an intense song, explaining that there was a lot of momentum and "a bit of a crescendo moment" when he was killed.

== Storylines ==
Mason, Brody and Justin Morgan join their sister Tori in Summer Bay. Mason and Brody have to stop Justin from fighting Martin "Ash" Ashford, who almost ran them off the road. Days after their arrival, Mason's former girlfriend Lara Adams visits him and they have sex. Justin catches them together and warns Lara to stay away. Mason confronts Justin, forcing Brody to stop them from fighting. Mason starts working at Brody's restaurant as a waiter, while he is also given a placement at the local hospital, where he clashes with his supervisor Nate Cooper. Lara sees Mason comforting Evie MacGuire and when she threatens to break up with him, Mason tells Lara that his family is in witness protection, as their parents were murdered by a drug syndicate. After their cover is exposed, the Morgans leave the Bay for a safe house. Mason slips outside to see Lara, but he is kidnapped by Spike Lowe and Blaine Varden, who Lara has been working for. Blaine threatens to kill the Morgans, before revealing that Justin knew that their father was working for the syndicate and that their mother sacrificed herself to save him. Lara frees Mason and the family are saved by the police and their federal protection officer, Decker. Mason and Tori ask Justin to leave the house, after learning that he lied to them.

Mason helps Evie out with a charity sleepover at Summer Bay High. They kiss, but she pulls away and he apologises. When Evie gets drunk at a university party, Mason brings her home and lets her stay on his sofa. While they are studying together, Mason and Evie have sex. They both admit that they are not over their former partners and agree to a friends with benefits arrangement. During a plane trip for Tori's birthday, a carbon monoxide leak causes the passengers and captain to pass out. The plane crashes into the desert and Mason has to treat a pregnant Billie Ashford (Tessa de Josselin), whose amniotic sac is damaged. Mason burns his arm when he pushes Evie out of the way of a fuel explosion. Evie insists that she was saved by her deceased brother and tries to prove that he is protecting her by driving dangerously with Mason in the car. Mason is forced to apply the handbrake to stop them from crashing. Mason realises he has feelings for Evie and wants more than a casual relationship with her. He eventually ends their arrangement. The Morgans learn Decker's niece Raffy Morrison is actually his daughter and their half-sister. Mason is in favour of telling Raffy the truth and attempts to make her feel like part of the family.

After noticing Olivia Fraser Richards arguing with her former boyfriend Hunter King, Mason asks her to go for a walk with him. He asks her out on a date, but she turns him down as she is not ready for a new relationship. Olivia invites Mason to escort her to her formal as friends, where she spends most of the night talking and dancing with Hunter. Mason begins working as a lifeguard and gets into a fight with Hunter on his first day. Mason helps Brody out at the Summer Grooves music festival, and he and Olivia kiss, before leaving to go skinny dipping. Mason and Olivia start dating, but he worries that she still has feelings for Hunter. The couple are later caught having sex at Summer Bay Auto. Olivia eventually admits to Mason that she does still have feelings for Hunter, but she wants to carry on dating him; however, Mason breaks up with her. Olivia later sets Mason up with her friend Lena Ascot (Felicity McKay), but nothing comes of it after he finds her dealing drugs at a party. Brody later develops a drug addiction and Mason has to take him to the hospital when he is beaten by his dealer. Mason is forced to work with Hunter at the surf club, where they clash again. Mason refuses to fight Hunter when he challenges him and they eventually become friends.

Mason realises Brody is suffering a relapse and drives him to rehab. Brody panics when he sees his dealer following them and grabs the wheel, causing the car to crash. Mason suffers spinal damage and is placed on life support. When he wakes, he realises that he has little feeling in his legs. Beth Ellis visits Mason and cheers him up. She tells him she is a nurse, but Mason soon learns she is a patient, who has cardiomyopathy and needs a heart transplant. Mason helps Beth to complete some things on her bucket list and they kiss. While driving to a casino, Beth collapses and Mason is forced to drive to get help. He later meets Beth's parents and her father Alan asks him to stay away from her, but he changes his mind. Mason and Beth have sex, but Beth collapses at the pier later that night. Mason tries to get her moved up the transplant list and pressures a car crash victim's husband into donating her heart. A complaint is made against him and his placement at the hospital is cancelled. Mason takes Beth out for lunch on the beach where he gives her an eternity ring. However, Beth becomes breathless and Mason rushes her back to the hospital. She goes into cardiac arrest and dies. Mason later sees visions of Beth and attempts to complete the rest of her bucket list.

After quitting his university course in the wake of Beth's death, Mason applies for the manager's job at the gym. Willow Harris (Sarah Roberts) also applies and John Palmer's (Shane Withington) gives it to them both. Mason gives Jennifer Dutton (Brittany Santariga) a private boxing lesson and she kisses him, but he pulls away and she makes it seem that he had made an unwelcome advance towards her as Hunter walks in. She apologises after Mason tells her about Beth. Mason befriends Jasmine Delaney (Sam Frost) and they bond over their respective medical careers. Mason decides to return to university and he is allowed to continue his placement at Northern Districts hospital. Mason develops feelings for Jasmine, and asks her to be his date to Ziggy Astoni's (Sophie Dillman) birthday party. When Mason comes to pick her up from Salt, he sees her talking to Colby Thorne (Tim Franklin), who Jasmine has feelings for. Mason befriends Dempsey Blackwood (Sophie Don) during a singles night at Salt, but their date is interrupted by Hunter and Olivia.

Weeks later, Dempsey returns to Salt and Mason apologises to her for getting distracted. He invites her to be his guest at Brody and Ziggy's wedding, where he is acting as best man. After the wedding, Mason spends the night at Dempsey's place. Weeks later, Dempsey returns to the Bay to tell Mason that she is pregnant. Mason says that he will support her and the baby, but Dempsey feels pressured by his declaration. She later tells him that she wants to have a proper relationship with him and raise the baby together, to which he agrees. However, when Dempsey suffers a miscarriage scare, she realises that she does not want the baby and books an abortion. Mason later tries again for another placement at the hospital but is successful this time.

Mason goes to work at the Hospital, but during his shift The Ouroboros Gang take all the patients and staff hostage, meanwhile Bella becomes really sick and the gang refuse treatment for her, Mason argues with them, but is shot dead in the process. Two years later, Brody names his son after Mason.

== Reception ==
For his portrayal of Mason, Pledger was nominated for Best Newcomer at the Digital Spy Reader Awards; he placed last after receiving 3% of the total vote. Jonathon Moran of The Daily Telegraph predicted that Pledger "will no doubt be a hit with the young female fans with his buff body." Sarah Ellis from Inside Soap branded Mason, Brody and Justin "another trio of troublesome brothers". She also noted their appearances, dubbing them "a tasty trio" and "hunky". Ali Cromarty and Stephen Downie of TV Week were impressed by the brothers, commenting, "Move over Braxtons, there's a new family of hot brothers in Summer Bay." They also called them "loyal, caring and hard-working". Downie later called the siblings "the mysterious Morgan brothers" and pointed out that they landed in "a whole lot of trouble" upon their arrival. Daniel Kilkelly from Digital Spy dubbed the Morgans "Summer Bay's unluckiest family". Writing for Stuff.co.nz, Kerry Harvey dubbed Mason "Summer Bay's good boy" and observed that he was "chilled-out". She also named him "the most sensible member of the Morgan clan".
