= Orpheus Pledger =

Australian actor (born 1993)

- Born: 11 May 1993 (age 33); Melbourne, Victoria, Australia
- Occupation: Actor
- Years active: 2001–2024
- Notable work: Home and Away (2016–2019)

Orpheus Pledger (born 11 May 1993) is an Australian actor, who started his career as a child performer. He played Tycho Everson in the children's series Silversun and in 2011, appeared as Noah Parkin in Neighbours. From 2016 to 2019, Pledger starred as Mason Morgan in the Australian soap opera Home and Away.

== Career ==
In 2002, as an eight-year-old, Pledger starred in writer-director Emma Freeman's short film Lamb. In the following year, he began appearing as Lewis Harfield in the drama series CrashBurn. In 2004, Pledger starred as Tycho Everson in the children's science fiction series Silversun. He also made guest appearances in The Secret Life of Us, Blue Heelers, Welcher & Welcher, Scooter: Secret Agent, McLeod's Daughters and Nick Giannopoulos' film The Wannabes.

In 2011, Pledger joined the cast of Neighbours as student Noah Parkin. Pledger's agent told him about the role and asked him to read through Noah's character notes. After deciding that he wanted the role, Pledger attended a screen test with the Neighbours casting director. After a recall, Pledger was told he had the role. He was contracted for six months. In 2014, Pledger appeared in the Nine Network television film Schapelle.

On 5 December 2015, Jonathon Moran of The Daily Telegraph reported that Pledger had joined Home and Away as Mason Morgan. He relocated from Melbourne to Sydney for the filming. He chose to leave the role in 2019, and his character was killed off in the season finale on 27 November.

In February 2022, Pledger took part in Season 3 of SAS Australia, but voluntarily withdrew after two days. He quit during a psychological evaluation by Ant Middleton and Doctor Dan to discuss his "erratic behaviour", after he was shown refusing to help out at the camp and receiving criticism from his fellow recruits.

== Personal life ==
On 19 February 2021, Pledger was charged with possessing half a gram of methylamphetamine, and 30 tablets of Diazepam, without a prescription. During the hearing at Melbourne Magistrates Court on 16 November, which Pledger did not attend, he accepted responsibility for the charges and was placed on a diversion program, which meant he did not have to enter a plea and was spared a criminal record. The magistrate also ordered Pledger to be of good behaviour for six months, donate $150 to the court fund, complete a drug awareness course, and thank the officer who charged him.

On 25 March 2024, Pledger was arrested for an alleged assault on a woman, and was remanded in custody after bail was refused. On 23 April, Pledger was set to appear via video link at the Melbourne Magistrates Court for a bail hearing, but failed to appear, having absconded from the Royal Melbourne Hospital while waiting for a medical assessment. His bail was revoked, an arrest warrant issued, and the case rescheduled to be heard on 10 May. Two days later, he was arrested by police and taken into custody. On 1 July 2024, Pledger pleaded guilty to causing injury and unlawful assault. Sentencing was adjourned until 3 July to allow an assessment of Pledger's suitability for a community corrections order. His lawyer stated that Pledger's mental health deteriorated after an acting role in the series The 100 fell through, and he began using methylamphetamine. Pledger was later released on bail while the magistrate waited to receive a report from corrective services. On 16 August, Pledger was sentenced to 7 months in prison after the magistrate found that he "lacked remorse for his conduct". He was later released on bail ahead of an appeal and was expected to return to court on 12 November 2024.

== Filmography ==
=== Acting ===
Year	Title	Role	Notes
2001	The Secret Life of Us	James	Episodes: "Intimations of Mortality" and "Now or Never"
2002	Lamb	Son	Short film
2002	Blue Heelers	Scott Robbins	Episode: "The Last Jar"
2002	Marshall Law	Freddie	Episode: "Snorting Charlie"
2003	Forbidden	Boy at Gate	Short film
2003	Welcher & Welcher	Winslow	Episode: "The Winslow Boy"
2003	The Wannabes	Young Danny	Feature film
2003	The Forest	James	TV movie
2003	CrashBurn	Lewis Harfield	Main cast (Season 1)
2004	Replacing Bradley	Bradley	Short film
2004	Silversun	Tycho Everson	Main cast (Seasons 1–2)
2005	Scooter: Secret Agent	Beast Boy	Episode: "Operation: Beast Boy"
2005	McLeod's Daughters	Max Wakefield	Episode: "Body and Soul"
2006	Blue Heelers	Olek Jasinski	Episode: "Going Down Swinging"
2011	Neighbours	Noah Parkin	Recurring role (Season 27)
2014	Schapelle	James	Television film
2014	House Husbands	Ian	Season 3, episode 4
2016–2019	Home and Away	Mason Morgan	Main cast (Seasons 29–32)

=== Other appearances ===
Year	Title	Notes
2019	Home and Away: Christmas in Summer Bay	Episode: "The Morgan Family"
2020	Q&AmyLive	Season 1, episode 11
2022	SAS Australia	Season 3
TBA	Surviving Sunset an Actor's Hollywood Journey	Documentary
