= Ryder Jackson =

Fictional character

- Home and Away character
- Portrayed by: Lukas Radovich
- Duration: 2017–2022
- First appearance: 25 October 2017
- Last appearance: 5 May 2022
- Introduced by: Lucy Addario
In-universe information
- Occupation: Student; Juice bar worker Bartender
- Father: Evan Slater
- Mother: Quinn Jackson
- Grandfathers: Alf Stewart
- Uncles: Owen Davidson
- Aunts: Roo Stewart

Ryder Jackson is a fictional character from the Australian television soap opera Home and Away, played by Lukas Radovich. The character made his first screen appearance on 25 October 2017. The character is introduced as the long-lost grandson of original character Alf Stewart (Ray Meagher). His mother is Quinn Jackson (Lara Cox), who is estranged from Alf. When he arrives in Summer Bay Alf does not know he exists, but his aunt Roo Stewart (Georgie Parker) convinces him to stay. Ryder is characterised as "mischievous" teenager with a "confident" and "cocky" attitude. Radovich has called him the product of a "broken home". Upon arrival he is portrayed as a "bad boy" committing thefts, including driving a stolen car which hits and injures Roo. Writers used Alf's influence over Ryder to help him improve his behaviour. The actor believed that Ryder grew up and matured during his first year on the show.

The writers made a friendship group between Ryder, Coco Astoni (Anna Cocquerel) and Raffy Morrison (Olivia Deeble). They compete for his attention but Ryder develops an attraction to Coco. The pair go on to have an on/off relationship. Ryder later befriends Ty Anderson (Darius Williams), who was Home and Away's first gay character in years. Writers planned a same-sex kiss scene for Ryder and Ty. When the pair spend time alone together Ty kisses Ryder who does not reciprocate. Despite not feeling the same, Ryder has a positive reaction and is supportive of his best friend. The scene was controversial with some viewers, but the storyline and Ryder's reaction drew praise from critics and viewers. The character departed on 5 May 2022.

== Casting ==
The character and Radovich's casting details were announced on 23 October. Radovich secured the part shortly after graduating from the Western Australian Academy of Performing Arts and it marks his first acting role. Ryder is the son of Quinn Jackson (Lara Cox) and grandson of Alf Stewart (Ray Meagher). Radovich thought he had "the most terrible audition" and subsequently booked a flight to Perth to visit friends. Radovich's agent told him that the two scenarios usually guarantee you get the role. He was later contacted by Home and Away offering him the role, and filming began in May 2017. Ryder made his first on-screen appearance during the episode broadcast on 25 October 2017. The actor was excited for everyone to watch his work. He had felt stuck in "limbo" during the five months between filming and his character's debut.

== Development ==
=== Characterisation ===
The mischevious [sic] teenager first arrived in the Bay when he fled from boarding school. Ryder is a bit of a bad boy, but his good looks and charisma make him easy to forgive. He's a troubled kid, with a lot of misguided anger. Underneath it all, Ryder just wants to be loved.

— An excerpt taken from the TVNZ Home and Away website.

Ryder is characterised as a "mischievous" who initially causes "havoc" upon his arrival in Summer Bay. Radovich stated that his character is a "troubled kid with a lot of misguided anger who just wants to be loved. He's trying to reach out and connect with anyone he possibly can." Ryder is also "confident", "cocky" and has a "cheeky side" to his persona. A writer from the show's official website billed the character as having "good looks and bad-boy charisma." Radovich has also described his character as "a bit of a bad boy but he’s also got a heart of gold." He had previously had a boarding school education but he ran away. He steals from other character's early episodes he features in. The actor explained that Ryder "ends up finding his way once he settles down in the bay." His grandfather Alf Stewart takes on a "fatherly role" and helps Ryder's bad behaviour improve. A writer from the show's official New Zealand website branded the Ryder an "over-confident" character.

Radovich was delighted that Ryder is the grandson of the show's long-standing original character Alf. He told Damien Madigan from The Blue Mountain Gazette that "everyone knows who Alf Stewart is so it's pretty crazy. I have to pinch myself knowing my character is related to Alf." He added that working closely with Meagher and Parker was beneficial to his progress in acting as they coached him. Radovich is six years older than his character but found the opportunity to play a school pupil "fun". He told Daniel Kilkelly that "I think having a second chance at it is quite a lot of fun." He added that despite Ryder being much younger than him, he found it easy to relate to that point in Ryder's life.

Radovich believed that writers slowly matured the character into someone who more responsible and appreciative of his friends. He told Daniel Kilkelly from Digital Spy that "he came into the Bay being quite a larrikin and somebody who didn't have much responsibility for his actions. I think that now he's got a support group of friends, he's realised how important they are to him." Ryder has a sensitive side which writers began showcasing more often and the actor found it more interesting to play. Radovich felt that it made Ryder "a more mature and well-rounded person". Radovich told Sarah Ellis from Inside Soap that he thought Ryder's maturity had always been there but hid behind "humour and cracking jokes".

=== Introduction ===
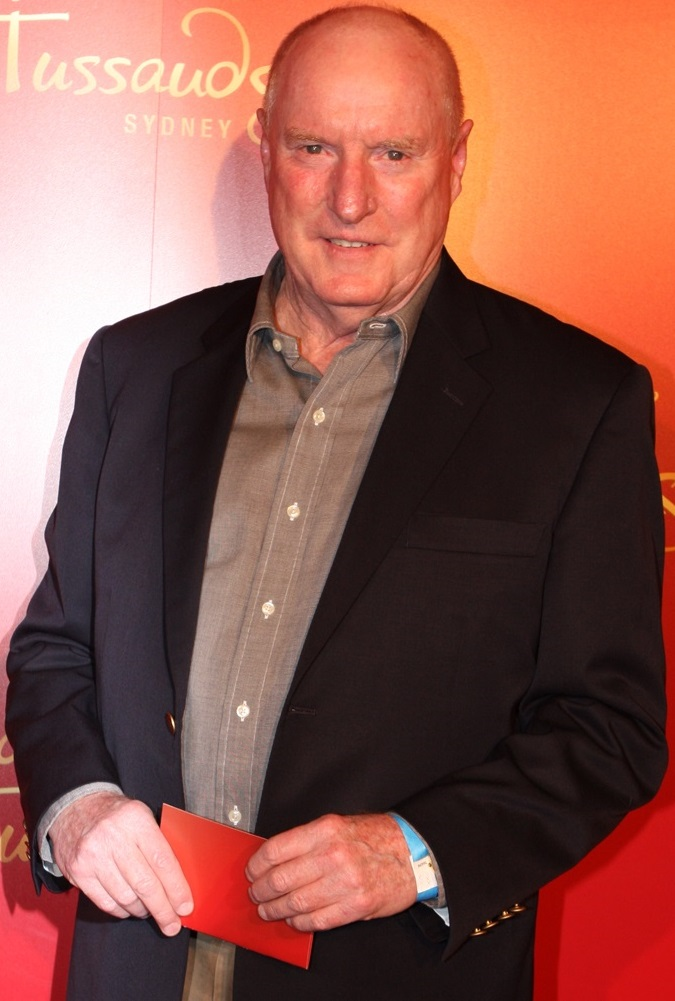
Ray Meagher plays Ryder's grandfather Alf Stewart.

His first scenes see him break into the Surf Club. When he is later caught for trying to steal from Hunter King (Scott Lee) and VJ Patterson (Matt Little), Ryder explains that he is Alf's grandson. Ryder refuses to give out Quinn's phone number, leading his aunt Roo Stewart (Georgie Parker) to suspect he has run away. Ryder also steals money from Alf's wallet and meets local resident Coco Astoni (Anna Cocquerel). Ryder's spate of thefts were the first scenes Radovich had to film on the show. The actor told Ali Cromarty from New Idea that "Ryder is caught stealing money and has to run away. It was pretty terrifying and so overwhelming."

Ryder's mother Quinn is the long lost daughter of Alf. While in the army he had an affair with Mary Jackson, an American officer stationed in Australia. She left to live in the US and Alf did not know that Quinn had been born. Quinn's initial time in the show brought back bad memories for Alf. Ryder's arrival brings back those memories, especially because writers created an identical scenario with Alf not knowing that Ryder exists. Radovich said that his character if from a "broken home" and his reason for coming to Summer Bay is to find his family. He wants to know the Stewart family because his life with Quinn is not enough. The actor explained that Quinn is "a single mother, who is trying her best, but Ryder is looking for something more."

Ryder decides to stay in Summer Bay and live with his estranged family. Parker, who plays Roo told Zoe Burrell from New Idea that her character is "extremely excited" he is staying and part of the family. Roo wants to be a role model for Ryder and Parker added "she's very keen for them all to have a healthy relationship and get along. And to give Ryder stability." Alf is not keen to concentrate on bonding with Ryder. Parker explained that Alf is convinced Ryder will return to live with Quinn and is afraid to build their relationship up only to lose him. Roo "has other ideas" and is "happy" Ryder came to live with them. Ryder's bad behaviour escalates following an argument with Quinn. He steals a car, drives off and hits Roo with the car. An Inside Soap reporter said that Ryder is full of "fury" and is so "angry" that he fails to notice Roo before running her over. Roo survives but is left in severe pain. Following this Ryder and his friend Raffy Morrison (Olivia Deeble) steal a boat. They are left "horrified" when they discover the dead body of Dennis Novak (Mirko Grillini) in the sand.

=== Relationship with Coco Astoni ===
Writers introduced a "love triangle" story for Ryder involving Coco and her best friend Raffy. Ryder spends time with both Coco and Raffy during a movie night. Raffy confesses that she likes Ryder causing Coco to hide her own feelings for him. Writers played Ryder and Coco nearly getting into a relationship multiple times but Coco is always hesitant. Each time Ryder shows Coco how much he likes her, Coco's anxiety takes over and they remain friends. Ryder later tries to impress Coco but she is preoccupied with her cancer stricken mother Maggie Astoni (Kestie Morassi). Raffy tells Coco that Ryder may lose interest in her so she decides to pursue and kiss him. Cocquerel told a reporter from Inside Soap that her character wants to prove to Ryder she wants to be with him. She added "I think he's a little surprised by her forwardness - but its certainly a welcome move." Raffy encourages Coco to make it official with Ryder. They plan their first date and Coco's normally over protective family support her dating Ryder. Cocquerel explained that Coco "really likes" Ryder. She described Ryder as "a little irresponsible, but he's also kind and funny", which Coco likes about him. Despite her excitement, an anxious Coco ruins their first date.

When Coco returns from a trip away, she keeps talking about a friend named Jeremy. This causes an issue with Ryder. After a short break-up they get back together. A What's on TV writer said that Ryder is "super-excited" to be with Coco again and they plan another date. Coco's father Ben Astoni (Rohan Nichol) becomes concerned and asks Alf and Roo to talk with Ryder. Roo offers him advice about her own experience with pregnancy, so he and Coco are aware moving forward in their relationship.

=== Same sex kiss ===
The character's role in the show's first gay storyline in nine years became controversial. Ryder was the subject of a same-sex kiss scene with Ty Anderson (Darius Williams). Anti or pro-LGBT viewers argued via the social networking website Facebook, making their views about the kiss public. The reaction was mostly positive, with the show being praised for its newfound diversity. The scene was significant for Home and Away because its management had previously edited out controversial kissing scenes in between Charlie Buckton (Esther Anderson) and Joey Collins (Kate Bell) in 2009. Radovich was thrilled to be a part of Ty's gay storyline because the show had not explored the issue much before. He believed it is an important story because some fans had long wanted Home and Away portray gay stories. The show films six months in advance so he anticipated what the audience's reaction to the scene would be.

Williams has stated that prior to filming the kiss scene he had been in constant conversation with writers, directors and Radovich about how to portray it. The scene was treated like any other during pre-production. On the day of filming, a number of rehearsals took place without the actors kissing. The final cut features the kiss, which Radovich claimed "we just treated it like any other scene." Williams stated that the response he received from viewers was "overwhelmingly positive".

The kiss scene occurs after Ty develops feelings for Ryder, despite dating their friend Raffy. Ty likes to create music and he shares some private songs with Ryder. Radovich called it "quite an intimate moment for them." Ty then discusses his friendship with Ryder, who then compliments him. He misunderstands the situation and kisses a surprised Ryder who pulls away. Despite not reciprocating, Ryder is supportive of his friends feelings. Some viewers praised Ryder's positive reaction to Ty's sexuality. The story progresses with Ryder trying to support Ty. He tells Ty that it is okay for him to be gay. The encounter leads to an embarrassed Ty causing a fight with Ryder. Radovich told Digital Spy's Kilkelly that Ryder is shocked about the kiss, but more so because he misjudged Ty's feelings and tried to get him in a relationship with Raffy. He added that "Ryder just wants to support Ty as much as possible [...] I think that Ryder's reaction will definitely showcase that." He thinks Ty had a difficult life in foster care and wants to help him. Ryder also wants to protect Raffy, but Radovich explained that Ty is his best mate and "he wants to do good by him no matter what." The actor concluded that it helped to show how the character had developed and matured during his time on the show.

=== Departure ===
In December 2021, New Idea's Catie Powers reported that Radovich was rumoured to be leaving Home and Away after he was photographed standing under a "Bon Voyage" banner at a party featuring cast and crew. Radovich's online CV was later updated to confirm that he had finished filming with the serial. In March 2022, Shauna Bannon Ward of RSVPLive.ie also confirmed the actor was soon to depart. Ryder's exit aired during the episodes broadcast on 5 May 2022. The character's departure storyline began with him confiding in Dean Thompson (Patrick O'Connor) about his desire to leave the Bay and train as a casino croupier. He also tells Dean that his mother has told him about a job opportunity aboard a cruise ship. However, he expresses worry about how his family will cope with his departure, but Dean says his family would want him to be happy. Ryder soon secures a job as a mixologist on the cruise ship, with the potential to train as a croupier. After his character's exit scenes aired, Radovich took to his social media and stated "I can't really express how the last 5 years has felt or impacted my life so I'll keep it short. I'll miss the job, but most importantly I'll miss the people." He also thanked director Tony Gardiner for Ryder's last scenes and the show's fans for their support.

== Reception ==
Johnathon Hughes from the Radio Times branded the character a "delinquent dude" and Quinn's "misbehaving offspring". He also named "cocky" Ryder a "bad boy" type character. New Idea's Burrell said that Ryder's arrival turned the "iconic" Stewart family upside down. She branded him the "long-lost member", "troubled teen" and newcomer who "certainly ruffled a few feathers." A What's on TV reporter opined that Ryder and Ty had an "annoying bromance". Seth Adamson from TV Soap said that "the relationship between Coco and Ryder has been anything but smooth sailing since they first laid eyes on each other months ago." He added that the situation between them was just "too intense" and branded their first date a "debacle". He also opined that Ryder arriving in the show was a "eerie case of history repeating itself", making comparisons to Quinn's arrival twenty-two years earlier.

In November 2021, three critics for The West Australian placed Ryder at number 47 in their feature on the "Top 50 heroes we love and villains we hate" from Home and Away. Of the character, they wrote: "Confident, cocky and cheeky, Ryder arrived in Summer Bay as most teens do, with huge chips on both of his shoulders. A troubled kid with lots of misguided anger, he was revealed to be Alf's grandson. Ryder's most significant storyline revolved around his best mate acting on feelings towards him that led to a kiss. It was the first gay storyline in nine years, and while Ryder did not reciprocate Ty's (Darius Williams) feelings, he supported his friend's sexuality."
