= List of Home and Away characters introduced in 2017 =

Characters in Australian TV series

Home and Away is an Australian television soap opera. It was first broadcast on the Seven Network on 17 January 1988. The following is a list of characters that appeared in 2017, by order of first appearance. All characters are introduced by the soap's executive producer, Lucy Addario. The 30th season of Home and Away began airing from 30 January 2017. Riley Hawkins was introduced during the following episode. Scarlett Snow made her debut in May, while June saw the arrival of the four-strong Astoni family consisting of parents Ben and Maggie Astoni, and their daughters Coco and Ziggy Astoni. Robbo and Jennifer Dutton made their first appearances in July, and Beth Ellis was introduced in August. Ryder Jackson make his debut in October. November saw the first appearance of Willow Harris, and Jasmine Delaney arrived in December.

== Riley Hawkins ==
Riley Hawkins
- Home and Away character
- Portrayed by: Ryan O'Kane
- First appearance: 31 January 2017
- Last appearance: 2 March 2017
- Introduced by: Lucy Addario
In-universe information
- Occupation: Surgeon

Riley Hawkins, played by Ryan O'Kane, made his first appearance on 31 January 2017. O'Kane's housemate Rob Mills also auditioned for the role. He was waiting for his agent to let him know the outcome when O'Kane revealed that he had won the part. Riley is introduced as Tori Morgan's (Penny McNamee) former boyfriend and a surgeon at the local hospital, who steps in to perform surgery on Justin Morgan (James Stewart). McNamee said the moment Tori is reunited with Riley is "shocking" for her because she has not seen him in seven years. While Riley is surprised to learn that Tori and her siblings have been in witness protection. Fellow doctor Nate Cooper (Kyle Pryor), who broke up with Tori, is jealous of her history with Riley.

On his first day at Northern Districts Hospital, Riley is asked to operate on Justin Morgan, the brother of his former partner Tessa Lee, now known as Tori. Tori explains to Riley that she and her brothers had to go into witness protection after their parents were shot. Riley tells Nate Cooper that he and Tori used to be a couple, and that he wants her back. He also apologises to Tori for cheating on her. When Justin learns Riley is in town, he warns him to stay away from Tori. Riley later treats Justin when he is admitted with an infection. He also tells Tori that Nate tried to make a bet with him about her, but she soon realises that he lied. Riley performs a bronchoscopy on Billie Ashford (Tessa de Josselin) and finds a mass in her airway. Tori and Riley go on a lunch date, where he asks her for another chance, but she is cautious due to his history. Brody Morgan (Jackson Heywood) sees Riley flirting with Evelyn MacGuire (Philippa Northeast) at Billie's wake, and tells him not to mess Tori around again. Shortly after they get back together, Riley asks Tori to move to the city with him. She turns him down for the sake of her family. Riley then sees her and Nate talking and hugging. He amends Billie's notes and then makes a formal complaint in an attempt to get Nate fired for medical negligence. Tori proves the notes were doctored and when Riley admits that he did it, she breaks up with him. When he shows up at her house, Tori tells him to get out of her life. Justin overhears them arguing and fights with Riley, before Tori orders him to leave. Riley quits his job at the hospital and leaves town.

== Scarlett Snow ==
Scarlett Snow
- Home and Away character
- Portrayed by: Tania Nolan
- First appearance: 8 May 2017
- Last appearance: 31 October 2017
- Introduced by: Lucy Addario
In-universe information
- Other names: Scarlett Dwyer
- Occupation: Bait shop assistant lawyer
- Husband: Caleb Snow
- Sons: Max Snow

Scarlett Snow, played by Tania Nolan, made her first appearance on 8 May 2017. Nolan was living in Los Angeles when she learned the role was available. She flew to Sydney, where the show is filmed, for a screen test. She returned to Los Angeles the following day, but soon learned she had won the role and had to fly back to Sydney two days later. Nolan was contracted for six months and she finished filming in May. Nolan described her character as "a bit of a mystery", and explained that no one knows why she is in the Bay, but she has suffered a tragedy in her past that she is dealing with. Nolan accepted the part and relocated to Sydney because of the character's "unique" storyline. The actress added, "I could relate to certain things Scarlett has been through. Not specifically, but unfortunately I know what it's like to go through what she went through.".

Brody Morgan (Jackson Heywood) jumps into Scarlett's car and orders her to drive, as he is avoiding the police. Scarlett pulls the car over and offers Brody her handbag, which he takes. Brody goes to Scarlett's house to return the handbag, but Scarlett hits him over the head with a vase and ties him up. She threatens to call the police, and Brody opens up to her about his drug addiction. She makes him call his family and then frees him. Brody leaves with William Zannis (Caleb Alloway), who he says is his brother, and Scarlett thinks he is going to get help. The police track down Scarlett and ask her about the carjacking. She tells them she did not get a good look at the carjacker. Scarlett finds Brody sleeping on the beach, and he blames her for his arrest. She buys him a coffee and takes him back to her house. She then visits his family and brings them to him. Mason Morgan (Orpheus Pledger) suggests that Brody stays with Scarlett and she agrees. Scarlett disapproves of the way Justin Morgan (James Stewart) handles Brody's addiction. Alf Stewart (Ray Meagher) tells Scarlett off for spear fishing in the wrong place. When she enquires about hiring a boat, Alf tells her she can borrow one for free if she can get it mended. Scarlett reluctantly hires Justin to help her.

Brody relapses and flees shortly before Scarlett finds he has ransacked the house, and stolen $10,000 and a bracelet. Her landlord asks her to leave, and Alf gives her a caravan at the Summer Bay Caravan Park, as well as a job at his bait shop. Bruno Addlen (Johnny Nasser) turns up in the Bay looking for Scarlett, having been hired by her husband. Bruno asks for $8000 to leave and keep her whereabouts a secret. Alf offers to lend Scarlett the money, but she turns him down. Tori later thanks Scarlett for helping Brody secure a lawyer and tells her the family will repay the money Brody stole, which allows Scarlett to pay Bruno. Scarlett bonds with Justin's daughter Ava Gilbert (Grace Thomas) when she visits him. Scarlett later listens to a voicemail message from her son, Max (Addison Price). While working on the boat together, Justin accidentally causes Scarlett's phone to fall into the sea. He retrieves it and gets it working again. He also notices that she has a son and questions her about it, causing Scarlett to slap him. She later apologises and decides to leave town, until Justin asks her to stay. Scarlett's estranged husband sends another private investigator after her, as he wants her to come home. Justin helps her to get out of the Bay and Scarlett tells him that her son died a year ago. Justin admits that he cares for her and allows Scarlett to take his car. Scarlett returns a week later and gets drunk on the anniversary of Max's death. She wakes up in Justin's bed and assumes they had sex, but he explains that she took a shower and fell asleep, while he slept on the couch. Scarlett apologises for over-reacting and tells Justin how her marriage broke down because of Max's death. Alf and Justin take Scarlett out in the boat for some fishing. When they attempt to leave, their boat fails to start and they have to spend the night on the beach. Alf is attacked by Robbo (Jake Ryan), who also scares Scarlett. Justin fixes the boat and they return home.

Scarlett attempts to kiss Justin, but he rejects her advances, later explaining that he still loves his former fiancée, Phoebe Nicholson (Isabella Giovinazzo). He later changes his mind and they go back to Scarlett's caravan, but Justin calls out Phoebe's name and they stop. After avoiding each other, Scarlett and Justin decide to give their relationship a chance. They go swimming, but Justin hits his head and does not resurface. Scarlett pulls him out and gets him breathing again, but she suffers a flashback to her son's death. Scarlett and Kat move in together, and Scarlett offers to be Brody's lawyer at his court case. After Brody is accused of stabbing someone, Scarlett looks at Kat's police files and then goes to a drug den to find the weapon. She and Kat briefly fall out. While Scarlett and Justin are celebrating Brody's suspended sentence, they are interrupted by the arrival of her estranged husband Caleb Snow (Josh McConville). Scarlett spends time with Caleb and they later meet over dinner, where Caleb brings her Max's stuffed toy, causing Scarlett to leave. Caleb reveals that he has been seeing a counsellor. Scarlett, Justin, Kat and Robbo go away to a cabin in the bush, where a bomb explodes and causes a piece of wood to pierce Scarlett's shoulder. While Justin looks after her, she calls out Caleb's name. Justin later breaks up with Scarlett, telling her that he cares for her, but their relationship will not work because of Caleb. Scarlett tells Caleb that she has feelings for Justin, but Caleb kisses her and tells her he wants her to move back home. Scarlett realises that Justin is right and she decides to leave the Bay with Caleb.

== Ziggy Astoni ==
Ziggy Astoni, played by Sophie Dillman, made her first appearance on 20 June 2017. Details about Ziggy were released in June. Ziggy is the eldest daughter of Ben (Rohan Nichol) and Maggie Astoni (Kestie Morassi). The Astonis are the first nuclear family to join the soap opera in 17 years, since the arrival of the Sutherlands in 2000. Karlie Rutherford of The Daily Telegraph described Ziggy as a "wild child" and a "rebel teenager". Ziggy was also a potential love interest for Brody Morgan (Jackson Heywood).

== Ben Astoni ==
Ben Astoni, played by Rohan Nichol, made his first appearance on 20 June 2017. Nichol previously appeared in the show in 2004 as Stafford McRae. He relocated from Melbourne to Manly, so he would be closer to the show's outdoor filming location, Palm Beach for the role. Ben moves to Summer Bay along with his wife Maggie (Kestie Morassi) and their two daughters Coco (Anna Cocquerel) and Ziggy Astoni (Sophie Dillman). The Astonis are the first nuclear family to join the soap opera in 17 years, since the arrival of the Sutherlands in 2000. Nichol called Ben "a good guy, he's a guy I'd like to have a beer with! I like the fact that Ben is very loyal and he's a lover. He's very in love with his wife."

== Maggie Astoni ==
Maggie Astoni, played by Kestie Morassi, made her first appearance on 21 June 2017. Morassi's casting was revealed in early 2017 when she was pictured filming on set, while her character details were announced on 4 June. Morassi told Luke Dennehy of Herald Sun that it took some time for her to get used to the fast-paced filming schedule of the show. She commented, "It was definitely a shock to the system. I'm mostly used to working on film, where you have a lot more time for rehearsals. With film you are shooting maybe three minutes a day, whereas here, you are shooting almost an episode a day." Maggie moves to Summer Bay with her husband Ben Astoni (Rohan Nichol) and their two daughters Coco (Anna Cocquerel) and Ziggy Astoni (Sophie Dillman). The Astonis are the first nuclear family to join the soap opera in 17 years, since the arrival of the Sutherlands in 2000.

== Coco Astoni ==
Coco Astoni
- Home and Away character
- Portrayed by: Anna Cocquerel
- Duration: 2017–2019
- First appearance: 21 June 2017
- Last appearance: 4 June 2019
- Introduced by: Lucy Addario
In-universe information
- Occupation: Student
- Father: Ben Astoni
- Mother: Maggie Astoni
- Sisters: Ziggy Astoni
- Grandfathers: Richard Walford
- Grandmothers: Diana Walford
- Uncles: Marco Astoni
- Aunts: Kate Walford

Coco Astoni, played by Anna Cocquerel, made her first appearance on 21 June 2017. Coco is the youngest daughter of Ben (Rohan Nichol) and Maggie Astoni (Kestie Morassi). The Astonis are the first nuclear family to join the soap opera in 17 years, since the arrival of the Sutherlands in 2000. Imogen Groome of the Metro reported that Coco could be a new love interest for VJ. In December 2018, Cocquerel confirmed that she would be reducing her filming hours while she completes Year 12 of school. She said, "I'll still be in the Bay, but I'm also at a regular school with all of my friends."

Coco is suspended from school for cyber-bullying another student. When Ziggy and Coco fight, their father, Ben, puts Coco's phone in the blender and turns it on. Ben and his wife, Maggie, decide to get away from the city and the family ends up in Summer Bay. Coco befriends Raffy Morrison (Olivia Deeble). Ben and Maggie decide to move the family to the Bay. Coco meets VJ Patterson and Raffy tells him that she is her French tutor. Coco plays along and VJ asks her out on a date. His mother, Leah Patterson-Baker (Ada Nicodemou) interrupts their date and reveals that Coco is only 16. She leaves the restaurant and later apologises to VJ. On her first day at Summer Bay High, Coco is embarrassed when her mother calls her by her nickname "Coco Pops". Jennifer Dutton (Brittany Santariga) then teases her about it and Raffy attempts to stand up for Coco, who tells her to get lost. Coco and Raffy make up when Coco offers to cover for Raffy, while she leaves the school. Jennifer continues bullying Coco and Raffy stands up for her. As Coco is teased for her appearance, she begins binge eating and making herself sick. She and Jennifer are suspended when they get into a fight at the beach.

Jennifer later realises that Coco has an eating disorder. She says that she will not tell anyone, if Coco can set her up on a date with VJ. Coco agrees and Jennifer's negative attitude towards her changes, causing strain on Coco and Raffy's friendship. During a surf lesson with VJ and Jennifer, Coco faints. She faints again while out jogging, causing her to fall down some stairs and fracture her wrist. She almost passes out again, but is caught by Robbo (Jake Ryan), who takes her to the hospital. Raffy and Coco mend their friendship. Coco continues to binge and make herself sick, and Leah later catches her doing. Leah tries to convince Coco to tell Ben and Maggie, but she refuses and begs Leah to keep it quiet. Leah offers her support and tells her to call if she is attempted to binge again. Coco discovers that Ziggy was involved in an incident at their old school in which Maggie was injured. Coco asks Ziggy to come clean, but Ziggy tells her that it will tear their family apart. While working outside, Coco collapses and suffers a seizure. At the hospital, Coco finally admits that she has bulimia. Coco blames Ziggy for putting their mother under stress. While Coco is at the Surf Club, she meets Ryder Jackson (Lukas Radovich) and he buys her a drink. Coco and Ryder later meet up at the Diner, where he asks her for her phone number. When he calls, Coco gets Ben to scare him off. Coco and Raffy soon befriend Ryder. When he overhears them organising a girls movie night, he invites himself along. Coco asks Raffy if she likes Ryder and Raffy replies that he is cool and asks Coco if she likes Ryder too, but Coco denies it. But after seeing Raffy and Ryder getting closer, Coco become jealous and leaves early. At home, Maggie catches Coco about to binge eat. Coco tells Raffy about her bulimia and that she also likes Ryder. Coco hosts a Glow Day event to raise money for charity. Raffy informs Coco that she told Ryder that she is not interested in dating him, so Coco can pursue Ryder.

Coco, along with Ben and Ziggy supports Maggie when she's diagnosed with cancer. Coco and Ryder then start dating, but later broke up when she starts talking to another guy when she was on camp. Coco was happy when Ziggy is engaged to Brody Morgan (Jackson Heywood) and was Ziggy's maid of honour at her wedding. Whilst Ziggy was on her honeymoon with Brody, Maggie was sick and Coco calls Ziggy to come home. Coco and Ryder gets back together, but soon broke up. Coco was hurt when Ryder and Raffy starts dating, but gives them her blessing. Coco decided to go to boarding school in Cairns, and Ben and Ziggy was happy for her, but Maggie refuses to let her go, but later changes her mind and Coco leaves to go to boarding school.

Months later, Coco returns to the Bay for Raffy's birthday party and lashes out at Brody for cheating on Ziggy with Simone Bedford (Emily Eskell). Coco continues to badmouth about Simone, calling her a "tramp". Brody tells Coco that she should be angry at him, not Simone. Coco cracks and telling them that they do not deserve to be happy. Coco apologise to Raffy for making a scene. Coco talks with Ziggy about her new relationship with Dean Thompson (Patrick O'Connor), and she later tells Bella Nixon (Courtney Miller) that it is only a fling. Coco then returns to boarding school.

== Robbo ==
Robbo
- Home and Away character
- Portrayed by: Jake Ryan
- Duration: 2017–2020
- First appearance: 25 July 2017
- Last appearance: 30 January 2020
- Introduced by: Lucy Addario
In-universe information
- Other names: John Doe; Beckett Reid; Ryan Shaw; Robbo Shaw
- Occupation: Handyman; AFP Federal Agent; Gym owner
- Father: Ian Shaw
- Mother: Wendy Shaw
- Brothers: Daniel Shaw
- Sisters: Sarah Shaw
- Wife: Lauren Shaw (backstory); Jasmine Delaney (2019–2020)
- Sons: Lucas Shaw
- Daughters: Sophia Shaw; Grace Morgan

Robbo (also John Doe), played by Jake Ryan, made his first appearance on 25 July 2017. Ryan admitted that he was not prepared for the fame that will come from appearing on the show, saying "Sometimes these bad boy characters can work in your favour and maybe no one will like me." He also told Karlie Rutherford of news.com.au that he lost 13 kg ahead of his debut, after gaining weight following an injury that ended his taekwondo career. Producers introduced Robbo in a bid to fill "the heart-throb void" left by Darryl Braxton (Stephen Peacocke). Ryan previously auditioned for the role of Brax, and he said, "Both characters have been painted with the bad boy brush... but they're very different." Robbo also became Kat's new love interest. The character was killed off in the opening episodes of the 33rd season, broadcast on 27 January 2020. In an interview with Maddison Hockey and Tamara Cullen of TV Week, Ryan admitted that he left Home and Away as his "time was done there". He did not think there was much more for his character to do and he liked that he went out "on a high". He added, "It's been an incredible ride. But you have to know when to call it with characters and I've been so fortunate with the storylines I had."

John Doe watches on as Alf Stewart (Ray Meagher), Scarlett Snow (Tania Nolan) and Justin Morgan (James Stewart) approach the cove, where he is hiding out, in a boat. While they are fishing, John Doe attempts to hot-wire the boat, but gives up when he sees Justin approaching. The boat fails to start and Alf, Scarlett and Justin camp out on the island. When Alf goes in search of firewood the following morning, John Doe hits him with a tree branch and takes his knife. He hides on the boat and emerges once it is docked in Summer Bay. John Doe breaks into the Pier Diner to steal some food, and Alf later finds him hiding on the boat. He pushes past Alf and Justin and later follows Alf to his house, where he produces the knife. John Doe tells Alf that he cannot recall who he is and needs answers. Alf's daughter Roo Stewart (Georgie Parker) and Constable Kat Chapman (Pia Miller) approach the scene and Kat talks him into giving her the knife. She calls Tori Morgan (Penny McNamee) to treat John Doe's head injury, and Tori takes him to the hospital to get a CT scan, as he is suffering from post-traumatic amnesia. He later leaves the hospital, but Kat convinces him to return. Kat runs his finger prints and DNA against the police database, but there are no hits. The nurses name him "Robbo" after Robinson Crusoe and he is discharged. Alf allows Robbo to stay at the Caravan Park.

Robbo decides to leave the Bay, but after saving Raffy Morrison (Olivia Deeble) from Mackenzie (Luke Davis), he decides to stay and wait to see if any information comes back about his tattoos. Kat and Scarlett take Robbo back to the cove and search his campsite. Kat finds a picture of herself, but Robbo does not know why he has it. John Palmer (Shane Withington) and Marilyn Chambers (Emily Symons) try to help Robbo figure out who he is, but when John attempts to teach him how to drive, Robbo backs the car into Kat's police cruiser. While taking him to the station, Kat stops off at a motel to find Brody Morgan (Jackson Heywood). Robbo notices Faz (Jesse Rowles) leave the room, and when he and Bob (Neal Horton) emerge with Brody and Ziggy Astoni (Sophie Dillman), Robbo attacks them. William Zannis (Caleb Alloway) pulls a gun, but Robbo disarms him, leading Kat to think Robbo might have been a police officer. Alf offers Robbo a job doing maintenance work around the Caravan Park. After Kat breaks up with her boyfriend Martin Ashford (George Mason), Robbo comes to her caravan and offers her a bottle of whiskey. They kiss, but Kat tells him it was a mistake. Scarlett offers to help Robbo and later gets a hit on one of his tattoos, which is connected to a woman called Rose. She gives him a list of addresses and Kat helps him out. At the second address, Robbo finds a burnt photo that shows his arm around a woman. He and Kat then find her body inside. Robbo decides to give up searching for information about his past and asks Kat to close the investigation. Robbo helps Coco Astoni (Anna Cocquerel) to the hospital when she faints at the beach.

During an overnight trip in the bush with Kat, Scarlett, and Justin, their cabin is set fire to by a stranger who Robbo chases down. He tells him his real name is Beckett Reid, and escapes before he can ask more. The man, whose name is revealed to be Dennis Novak, returns and targets Kat. After confronting him, he tells Robbo they were partners in crime, and urges him to come back. After he kidnaps and attempts to murder Kat, Robbo saves her and kills Novak, burying him in the bush. As the police uncover Novak's death, they close in on Robbo as the prime suspect. After Kat and Ash discover proof of his guilt, he tries to convince her to flee the Bay with him, but she refuses. After kidnapping and releasing Tori with an address for Kat, he escapes, but returns to confront Kat and asks her to come with him. She again refuses and he hands himself into the police; however, Kat frees him and they drive off together. As they are leaving the Bay, they are involved in a major car accident, which leaves them both injured. Kat begs Robbo to leave her, so he will not be arrested. He reaches the house where he and Kat were going to start a new life and waits for her. He later contacts the hospital and Tori informs him that Kat and her baby have died. Robbo mourns them, while Ash swears to find Robbo and exact his revenge. Robbo returns to the Bay and collapses in Tori's garden due to an infection. Tori hides him in the garage and treats his injuries. Justin plans to get him out of town in the boot of a car with help from Willow Harris (Sarah Roberts). As Robbo is about to take the car and leave, he finds a photo of himself with a woman and two children. He becomes unresponsive and Willow decides to hide him in a motel in the Bay. Robbo eventually tells Tori that the people in the photo are his wife and children. After learning that Ash is searching the local area for him, Tori and Willow take Robbo back to the Morgan's house. Robbo is finally able to recall that his real name is Ryan Shaw and that his family are dead. As he goes to hand himself in to the police, he is spotted by Ash, who chases him up to the headland. Robbo gives in and prepares for Ash to beat him, but the police arrive and arrest them both. However Robbo is later released on bail until his trial.

At the near conclusion of Robbo's trial, with the jury having reached a verdict, and the Judge about to read it out, the Australian Federal Police (AFP) unexpectedly storm into the courtroom and hastily seize Robbo. An AFP officer tells Tori to forget Beckett Reid ever existed as Robbo is rushed into an unmarked police van. Robbo is taken to an unknown AFP base and is cuffed to a table in an interview room. During the interview, his memories start coming back as he sees dozen of pictures of him and his family. An AFP officer, Lance Salisbury (Angus McLaren), tells Robbo that he is an AFP officer. Lance confirms to Robbo that his real name is Ryan Shaw, and explains that Robbo was working undercover as Beckett Reid to track down the people that killed his family. His real identity was completely wiped off of the system like he never existed. A new fictional identity was created as part of the cover story to ensure the crimes that he had supposedly committed never actually happened, and that no one knew he is an AFP officer. Additionally, it is further revealed that Robbo was sent to Summer Bay to protect Kat as part of his undercover mission, but everything went wrong when he lost his memories. Robbo returns to the Bay, accompanied by Lance, for unfinished business. Lance returns all of his belongings, including his real passport, driver's licence, and credit cards. Additionally, Lance gives back Robbo's AFP ID badge and advises him to think about returning to AFP. Robbo soon approaches Ash to tell him everything, but Ash refuses to listen to him, but eventually goes with Robbo to hear the truth where he finds out Robbo was an AFP officer. Robbo decides not to return to the AFP and purchases the local gym instead. He finds support from Jasmine Delaney (Sam Frost) and they become close, but she tells him that she just wants to be friends. However, she realises that she has romantic feelings for him and they start a relationship. Shortly after Tori asks Robbo if he would father a child with her using IVF and he agrees. Tori becomes pregnant, but she later has a miscarriage and Robbo decides he does not want to try again. He proposes to Jasmine, who accepts. Robbo later learns that Tori used a second embryo to get pregnant again and that Jasmine knew. He ends their engagement and leaves the Bay. Robbo returns two months later for Tori's first ultrasound at the hospital. Jasmine sees him and leaves, refusing to talk to him. Robbo tries to talk to her, but Jasmine struggles with his presence and admits that his departure brought up memories of her father leaving her when she was young. The couple eventually reconcile and get married, but during the reception the AFP arrive and escort Robbo, Jasmine and Tori to a safe house. Robbo later does hypnotherapy to try and remember what happened to Dylan Carter, the first try is unsuccessful when he attacks Alex Neilson (Zoe Ventoura). But the second try they tie Robbo to the chair and are successful. Robbo was involved in a car accident and was taken to the hospital, his surgery was successful but Robbo later suffers from a hemorrhage and despite the doctors best efforts to revive him, he dies, he later appears to Jasmine in a dream.

== Jennifer Dutton ==
Jennifer Dutton
- Home and Away character
- Portrayed by: Brittany Santariga
- Duration: 2017–2018
- First appearance: 27 July 2017
- Last appearance: 21 March 2018
- Introduced by: Lucy Addario
In-universe information
- Occupation: Student
- Father: Nick Dutton

Jennifer Dutton, played by Brittany Santariga, made her first appearance on 27 July 2017. Santariga's casting was confirmed in June 2017 when she was photographed filming alongside actors Matt Little and Anna Cocquerel at Palm Beach, the show's outdoor location. Jennifer was introduced as a high school student, who bullies Cocquerel's character Coco Astoni. Carley Duffy of 2Day FM reported Jennifer would later become a love interest for Hunter King (Scott Lee). She also added that Santariga "already caused quite a stir at Summer Bay High playing the role of bully Jennifer."

Jennifer teases Coco Astoni after her mother and school principal, Maggie Astoni (Kestie Morassi), calls her by her embarrassing nickname, "Coco Pops" on her first day. Jennifer tells Coco that she has been given a detention from Maggie and Coco pushes her books to the floor, before VJ Patterson (Little) breaks up the confrontation. Jennifer puts rubbish in Coco's locker and teases her about her social media photos. Raffy Morrison (Olivia Deeble) stands up to Jennifer on Coco's behalf, calling her "Jenny" as she knows Jennifer hates it. Jennifer insults Coco's appearance and weight. Coco starts a fight with Jennifer, which is broken up by Maggie. She suspends them both and Jennifer's father Nick (Jacob Allan) collects her from school. Jennifer realises Coco has an eating disorder and threatens to reveal it, unless Coco gets her a date with VJ. Coco agrees and she begins to spend time with Jennifer, which causes a strain on her friendship with Raffy. Jennifer has a surfing lesson with VJ and Coco, and she helps Coco after she faints on the beach. During Olivia Fraser Richards' (Raechelle Banno) fashion line launch party at Salt, Jennifer encourages Raffy to drink alcohol, causing her to get drunk. The next day, Raffy confronts Jennifer and pushes her, which Maggie witnesses. Jennifer attends Summer Bay's Glow Day, hosted by Coco. She is paired with Ryder Jackson (Lukas Radovich) for the obstacle course, and he causes her to fall and sprain her wrist. Jennifer flirts with Raffy's brother Mason Morgan (Orpheus Pledger) when he treats her. Jennifer then trains with Mason at the gym, where she kisses him. Mason pushes her away, as he is still grieving for his late girlfriend and Jennifer apologises. Jennifer comforts Hunter King after Olivia rejects his marriage proposal. Jennifer and Mason support Hunter in the wake of his break up, and Hunter helps Jennifer with her studies. While they are at the beach together, Jennifer kisses Hunter and asks him to come to Diner to help her with an assignment. Hunter mistakenly assumes it is a date, so Jennifer invites him to go on a real date and he accepts. The two start dating, much dismay to Olivia. Jennifer attends to a university party with Hunter, where Nick finds her and accuse Hunter of giving Jennifer alcohol and telling him to stay away before taking her home. Jennifer runs away from home and moves in the Summer Bay House with Hunter. But she was later kicked out by Alf Stewart (Ray Meagher), when he walks in on her and Hunter making out. Hunter breaks up with her and she moves out and became homeless. Jennifer decided to move back in with Nick and says goodbye to Hunter before she leaves.

== Beth Ellis ==
Beth Ellis
- Home and Away character
- Portrayed by: Anneliese Apps
- First appearance: Episode 6723; 31 August 2017
- Last appearance: Episode 6764; 30 October 2017
- Introduced by: Lucy Addario
In-universe information
- Father: Alan Ellis
- Mother: Jackie Ellis

Elizabeth "Beth" Ellis, played by Anneliese Apps, made her first appearance on 31 August 2017. The actress secured the role five months after graduating from Western Australian Academy of Performing Arts. She initially thought she had performed badly in the audition, but received a callback, which she felt had gone well. She learned she had won the role a week later.

Apps was excited for the audience to meet Beth and said her storyline was "moving". Describing her character, Apps stated "Beth is cheeky, layered and she wants to make the people around her feel good. She is mysterious, perhaps even a bit quirky, like me – I'm not that mysterious, but I'm definitely a bit quirky." Beth was also introduced as a love interest for Mason Morgan (Pledger). Apps told a columnist for New Idea that Beth wants to help Mason, as she sees part of herself in him.

While she is at the hospital, Beth overhears Mason Morgan shouting at his siblings about his paralysis. She later changes into some nursing scrubs and attempts to cheer Mason up. Beth convinces him to get in the wheelchair and they race around the corridors. Mason meets Beth again and they spend some more time together. It emerges Beth is a patient when she returns to her room to continue her treatment. Beth and Mason spend more time together, and he introduces her to his sister Tori Morgan (Penny McNamee). Beth keeps up the pretence that she is a nurse, but Mason later finds her in her room undergoing a procedure. He attempts to look at her file and Beth catches him. She tells Mason that she has cardiomyopathy and is waiting for a heart transplant. Beth explains that she liked pretending to be someone else, as she did not want Mason to pity her. They agree to start their friendship over. Beth encourages Mason to forgive his brother Brody Morgan (Jackson Heywood) for causing the crash that paralysed him. Mason finds Beth's bucket list and arranges for them to get tattoos together. Beth kisses him during their dinner date, and they later go skinny dipping. When Beth asks Mason what he would put on his bucket list, Mason arranges for them to get dressed up and go to a casino. Beth cancels a hospital appointment for the trip, but during the drive she becomes short of breath and faints. Mason helps Beth into the back seat of the car and he is forced to drive them to Tori, who helps transfer Beth to an ambulance. Beth later visits Mason to let him know she is okay. Mason introduces her to his siblings as his girlfriend.

When Mason sees Beth and her father, Alan Ellis (Blair McDonough) together, he introduces himself and realises that Beth has not told her parents about their relationship. Beth tells Mason that she knew they would want her to focus on her health. Alan invites Mason to lunch and Beth's mother Jackie (Rachael Coopes) joins them. Mason later tells Beth that Alan asked him to stay away from her, so she confronts her father and tells him that she is not breaking up with Mason. Beth collapses and is admitted to the hospital, where Tori informs her that she needs a stent. Beth's condition worsens and she is moved up the transplant list. When Beth is feeling better, Mason is given permission to take her out for the afternoon. Mason arranges for them to have lunch on the beach, where he gives Beth a promise ring. Beth suddenly becomes short of breath and Mason gets her back to the hospital, where she suffers a sudden fatal arrhythmia and dies. After her funeral, Mason sees a vision of Beth in his room, she tells him to move on in his life.

== Ryder Jackson ==
Ryder Jackson, played by Lukas Radovich, made his first appearance on 25 October 2017. The character and Radovich's casting details were announced on 23 October. Radovich secured the part shortly after graduating from the Western Australian Academy of Performing Arts and it marks his first acting role. Ryder is the son of Quinn Jackson (Lara Cox) and grandson of Alf Stewart (Ray Meagher). His first scenes see him break into the Surf Club. When he is later caught for trying to steal from Hunter King (Scott Lee) and VJ Patterson (Matt Little), Ryder explains that he is Alf's grandson. Ryder refuses to give out Quinn's phone number, which leads his aunt Roo Stewart (Georgie Parker) to suspect he has run away.

== Willow Harris ==
Willow Harris (also Ranger), played by Sarah Roberts, made her first appearance on 14 November 2017. Prior to securing the role of Willow, Roberts auditioned for both Kat Chapman and Scarlett Snow. She flew up from Melbourne to Sydney for the audition and had a chemistry reading with James Stewart, who plays Justin Morgan. Roberts did not think she had won the part, as it took a while for the producers to contact her. Roberts described Willow as a "strong, female character", who is also independent, loyal and fierce. The actress said Willow would bring "mischief and a bit of trouble" to Summer Bay. Roberts added that Willow was "definitely a bad girl. But for all the right reasons. She has taken wrong turns and made decisions that some people would consider 'bad', but only to help the people that she loves." She soon becomes a love interest for Justin Morgan.

== Jasmine Delaney ==
Jasmine Delaney, played by Sam Frost, made her first appearance on 18 December 2017. Frost's casting was announced on 17 July 2017. She was asked to audition for the show while she was appearing on Hell's Kitchen Australia. Frost did not think she would win the role, after going up against several actresses, but she was told that she had secured the part after a second audition. Frost commented "I grew up watching Home and Away and never in my wildest dreams did I think I would be on set and part of the cast." The role marks Frost's acting debut. Frost's casting attracted criticism from some actors, who dubbed it a publicity stunt. Jasmine's first scenes saw her involved in a car crash that results in the death of Kat Chapman, played by Pia Miller. Frost described Jasmine as "quite guarded", with "an anxious energy." She is hiding secrets and has "a dark past".

== Others ==
Date(s)	Character	Actor	Circumstances
31 January–23 November	Luc Patterson	Eva Lockyer, Piper Dickson, Annabel May Sealey, Tayari Gee, Archie Freeland, Sterling McKenna Foster, Anastasia Lee Hayes, Sierra Sila, Lucas Bowman	Luc is Billie Ashford and Mick Jennings's daughter. Billie conceives after she is raped by Mick. She allows her boyfriend VJ Patterson to believe that he is the baby's father, until their wedding day. Billie gives birth to her daughter at the hospital, shortly after escaping a bush fire. VJ reveals that he and Billie are naming her Luc, after Billie's late brother, Luke Ashford. VJ's mother, Leah Patterson Baker is not keen on the name, but VJ explains that Luc is short for Lucinda, which leads Leah to question why her name is not Lucy instead. Mick later kidnaps Luc from the hospital, but he soon hands her over to his mother Irene Roberts, who returns her to Billie. A blessing is held for Luc, but Billie collapses and is later told that she has terminal cancer. VJ takes Billie to the beach, where she dies with Luc in her arms. VJ struggles to cope with Luc, so he and Leah allow her to stay with Irene. Ash feels that he is being left out, and when Luc gets sick, he decides to apply for temporary custody, which he wins. Ash then takes Luc to live with him, Kat Chapman and his brother Patrick Stanwood. Patrick almost harms her due to his PTSD. Ash and Kat take Luc camping when she fails to settle, but Ash cannot wake her in the morning and she later suffers convulsions on the way to the hospital. Tori Morgan informs Ash and Kat that Luc is suffering from a bowel torsion and part of her bowel has become gangrenous. Luc develops septicaemia and she undergoes surgery. The surgery goes well but she is left on life support. Luc wakes up and makes a full recovery. Mick returns to the Bay and accepts he cannot be in Luc's life, but when Irene collapses with a heart condition, Mick takes Luc back to Irene's house without letting anyone know. Ash finds out and kidnaps Mick, which leads Mick to determine that Ash should not be raising Luc and applies for custody. Mick makes it really difficult for Ash to win, so VJ leaves the country with Luc and raises her in Cyprus.
1 February–	Constable Corelli	Nick Cain	Constable Corelli assists Kat Chapman with an open arson case. Months later, Corelli finds CCTV footage of Robbo being held at gunpoint by Dylan Carter at a marina.
2 February	Lactation Consultant	Gail Knight	The Lactation Consultant helps Billie Ashford to nurse her newborn daughter.
23 February–1 May	Ambulance Officer	Rob Baird	The Ambulance Officer brings John Palmer to the hospital, after he suffers a seizure at home. A few months later, he brings Zac MacGuire in after Zac suffers a fall. The Ambulance Officer tells Tori Morgan that Zac hit his head and lost consciousness for three to five minutes.
27 February–8 May	Patrick Stanwood	Luke McKenzie	Patrick comes to the beach to watch the funeral service for Billie Ashford. Kat Chapman spots him leaving. She later identifies Patrick as Billie and Martin Ashford's brother, Luke, who is presumed dead. After Kat and Ash search Patrick's home, he appears and calls out to Ash, who punches him and leaves. Patrick comes to the Summer Bay Caravan Park to see Ash. He tells him that he faked his death as he was depressed following his last tour of duty. Kat brings Patrick to the station for questioning. Ash later introduces Patrick to his niece Luc. Kat forces Ash and Patrick to sit down and talk. Patrick stops Ash from attacking John Palmer. Patrick moves into the farmhouse with Kat. She and Ash soon realise that he is suffering from PTSD, which worsens when Ash is granted temporary custody of Luc. Patrick strikes Ava Gilbert with his car while suffering a flashback. He later reveals to Ash that he killed a young girl while he was serving in the army. Patrick leaves the Bay, and Ash finds him on some cliffs. Ash stops Patrick from hurting himself and tells him that he and Luc need him around. Patrick finally bonds with Luc and agrees to get help for his PTSD.
7 March–15 August	Lena Ascot	Felicity McKay	While attending O-Week at the university, Lena bumps into Olivia Fraser Richards and asks for directions to the design and arts building. She later invites Olivia to a student night at Salt, and introduces her friends Byron and Steve. Lena later introduces herself to Olivia's former boyfriend Mason Morgan. Lena sells drugs at the student night and Brody Morgan asks her to leave Salt. She tells him to look the other way, but Brody throws everyone out. Lena collects her credit card the following day and apologises to Brody. He later hires her as a waitress at Salt, but threatens to fire her when he catches her using cocaine. Lena gives some to Brody, and he takes it to help him create a new menu. Brody and Lena have a brief romantic relationship, until he fires her. Brody's brother Justin Morgan sees Lena at the beach and tells her that Brody has developed a drug addiction. He grabs her arm and warns her to stay away. Kat Chapman intervenes and Lena leaves. Kat later brings Lena to the police station to question her about selling drugs. Justin tries to talk to Lena again, after Brody goes missing, but she tells him that she has not seen Brody and walks away. Raffy Morrison later asks for Lena's help in finding Brody, and Lena gives Justin an address to a house that Brody might be staying in. Months later, Lena attends the same rehab facility as Brody and encourages him to sneak out. She produces some drugs and tries to tempt Brody to use again, but he leaves her and walks back to rehab.
7 March	Byron	Benjamin Winckle	Byron encourages Olivia Fraser Richards to come to Salt with him and Lena Ascot later in the week. After learning Olivia's boyfriend Hunter King is repeating his final school year, Byron tells him that Olivia is out of his league and they fight. Mason Morgan intervenes and sends Byron away.
9 March	Local Woman	Meagan Caratti	The local man and woman recognise John Palmer from the newspaper, and the man tells John to take some responsibility for the fires he started. The woman calls John a coward, leading his wife Marilyn to defend him.
9 March	Local Man	James Caitlin	The local man and woman recognise John Palmer from the newspaper, and the man tells John to take some responsibility for the fires he started. The woman calls John a coward, leading his wife Marilyn to defend him.
13 March–18 April	Jess Kearney	Jess Bush	Olivia Fraser Richards meets with Jess at the Pier Diner for a study session. Jess embarrasses Olivia's boyfriend Hunter King, as he is repeating Year 12. A few weeks later, Hunter invites Jess to Salt to celebrate Olivia's birthday.
21 March	Cal Whitman	Craig Scott	Cal is one of several people forced to stay at the Caravan Park, after their homes are destroyed in a bush fire started by John Palmer. John later address everyone to tell them that he is sorry and would like a chance to help them. Cal tells John that he appreciates his gesture.
22 March, 6 December	Terry Diamond	Rob Flanagan	Terry is a renowned restaurant critic, who comes to review the food at Salt. After giving his opinion, Brody Morgan tells Terry he is wrong and insults him. Months later, Terry returns to Summer Bay and orders a meal at the Pier Diner. He asks Marilyn Chambers if he can meet the chef, but she tells him the chef is shy. Terry later goes into the kitchen and discovers the chef is Brody. Terry tells Brody that he is talented and could achieve great things.
29 March–3 April	Donna Fields	Melissa Bonne	Donna comes to Summer Bay to surprise her friend Phoebe Nicholson, ahead of her engagement party. They talk about Donna's music career, and Donna asks Phoebe why she left music. She criticises her new life in Summer Bay, and Phoebe tells her not to come to the party. Donna later apologises, and Phoebe explains that she is happy and that she will play a song at the party. Before Donna leaves town, she asks Phoebe to come on tour with her in the United States.
29 March–29 August	Lachlan Piers	Warwick Allsopp	Lachlan is John Palmer's lawyer. He shows little interest in John's case and asks John to use insane automatism in his defence instead of mentioning his brain tumour blackout. John later fires Lachlan. Months later, Lachlan tells Ben Astoni that his planning application for the pier is on hold after someone applied for heritage status.
29 March–20 April	James Mayvers	Tim Ross	James is Roo Stewart's boyfriend, who she met in Hawaii. He comes to visit her in Summer Bay and she tries to keep him a secret from her friends, but her aunt Morag Bellingham finds him in Roo's bedroom. James assures Roo that their age gap does not matter to him. Morag tells James not to get too attached to Roo. James is hired by a news agency to photograph John Palmer after he is convicted of arson and manslaughter. James finds Roo when she faints and she tells him that she think she is going through menopause. James attends Olivia Fraser Richards' birthday party with Roo, where Marilyn Chambers realises that he took the photos of John. He and Roo argue, but she later invites him over to the flat to tell him she is pregnant. James asks her to have a termination, as he does not want to be a father, but she decides to keep the baby and raise it as a single parent. Roo later has a miscarriage.
3 April–30 August	William Zannis	Caleb Alloway	Zannis meets with Brody Morgan, on Lena Ascot's behalf, to sell him cocaine. He later sells Brody methamphetamine. Brody meets with Zannis to buy more drugs, but when he cannot come up with much money, Zannis tells him he could always start selling. When Brody fails to come up with the money for the drugs Zannis gave him to sell, Zannis has him beaten and dumped in the bush. Brody later pays his debt and buys more drugs. Brody contacts Zannis and pretends they are brothers in front of Scarlett Snow, so she will let him leave her house. Zannis is spotted selling drugs by Kat Chapman. She tries to stop him, but he drives at her causing her to jump out of the way. The police find his meth lab, but Zannis disappears. He later finds Brody and tells him he is calling in the favour Brody owes him. Zannis informs Brody that a shipment of drugs is coming to the restaurant, but Brody tells him that he is done and warns Zannis that he will go to the police if he comes back. Zannis enters the Morgan's house and spikes the drinking water with potassium. Zannis flees when the police try to arrest him. Zannis returns to town and offers Brody more drugs. He later attempts to run Brody and Mason Morgan's car off the road, and when they crash he comes over to see if they are still alive. Zannis believes Ziggy Astoni is Brody's girlfriend and kidnaps her. He uses her phone to lure Brody to a motel, and then tries forcing Brody into taking drugs. Kat turns up and is knocked out by Zannis's accomplice, Faz. Zannis decides to move Ziggy and Brody to a new location, but when he goes outside with a gun, he is disarmed by Robbo. His bail is later revoked.
10 April	Court Officer	Alistair Bates	The court officer asks VJ Patterson to take the oath, before giving his statement.
10 April	Jury Foreperson	Aanisa Vylet	The foreperson reads out a guilty verdict in John Palmer's arson and manslaughter trial.
10 April	Police Officer	Joshua Farah	The police officer escorts John Palmer from the court to a waiting police van.
11–25 April	Prison Officer	PJ Williams	The prison officer asks Marilyn Chambers to take off her bag and jewellery before visiting John Palmer. He tells her she will get used to the routine. A few days later, he reminds John and Deacon Marx that cell doors should remain open, before escorting John to his meeting with Morag Bellingham.
12 April	Annie Banks	Raelee Hill	Annie mediates a meeting between Martin Ashford, Kat Chapman, Irene Roberts, VJ Patterson and Leah Patterson-Baker when Ash and Irene apply for custody of Luc Patterson. When Annie realises that they will not reach a peaceful agreement, she ends the meeting and takes the case to the court, which grants Ash a six-month interim parental responsibility order.
13 April	Delivery Guy	Brendan Dodds	The delivery guy brings a food order to Salt, but tells Brody Morgan that his credit cards have been declined. When Brody says that he will go upstairs to get cash, the delivery guy tells Brody to make it quick.
17–25 April	Deacon Marx	Sam Smith	Deacon notices Marilyn Chambers when she visits John Palmer in gaol and stares at her. He later gets in Marilyn's way as she leaves and smacks her bottom. John grabs Deacon and pushes him up against the wall, causing the guards to pull them apart. Deacon later confronts John about Billie Ashford's death and shows him his burns from a fire started by another arsonist. John hits him and Deacon's friends attack him in retaliation. Deacon continues to threaten John, and brings a weapon into his cell, but John manages to talk him down.
17 April	Bartender	Alex Ewan	Hunter King orders two cocktails from the Salt bartender for himself and Olivia Fraser Richards, pointing out that Olivia's 18th birthday is in a few hours, but the bartender refuses to make them. The bartender later brings over an alcoholic drink and tells Hunter and Olivia that it has gone midnight.
3–11 May	Brian Gilbert	Tom O'Sullivan	Brian comes to the Bay to collect his stepdaughter Ava Gilbert when she comes to meet her father Justin Morgan. Brian tells Ava off for running away, before clashing with Justin. Ava runs off while they are arguing and she is struck by a car. Brian and Justin clash at the hospital, and Brian tells Justin that he cannot see Ava. Justin later apologises and thanks Brian for being there for Ava. Brian visits Justin and allows him to see Ava. He later brings her back to the Bay for Justin's farewell party.
8 May	Tony Stoiov	Patrick Dickson	Tony is a pawnbroker, who offers Brody Morgan $10 for a necklace he wants to sell. Brody gets argumentative and Tony asks him to leave, but Brody starts smashing up the stock. Tony calls the police and Brody runs off.
9 May, 11 July	Terry Deakins	Chris Hanrahan	Terry is from the department of education. He meets with Zac MacGuire, who wants to discuss a potential move. John Palmer notices Terry walking by the Surf Club and introduces him to Zac's son Hunter King. Terry asks Hunter to speak to Zac about his potential relocation. Terry later meets with Roo Stewart and Maggie Astoni about the vacant principal job at Summer Bay High.
10 May	Postman	Jonathan Lee Jones	The postman delivers a contract from the Mayvers family to Roo Stewart.
17 May	David Mayvers	Noel Hodda	David is James Mayvers's father. He comes to the Bay to talk to Roo Stewart, who is pregnant with James's baby. He apologises for sending her a contract and then offers her $250,000, so that she and her child do not contact James. David urges Roo to think about their future, but she asks him to leave. She later meets with him and rejects his offer.
22 May	Heather Shirley	Meagan Caratti	Heather berates John Palmer for organising a fundraiser for the burns unit, after he was charged with arson.
24 May	Helena Harrison	Jenevieve Chang	Helena and Joseph are Leah Patterson and Zac MacGuire's divorce lawyers. They meet at Salt for the signing of the papers. Zac does not show up, but Leah signs the papers anyway.
24 May	Joseph Moore	Joel Pierce	Helena and Joseph are Leah Patterson and Zac MacGuire's divorce lawyers. They meet at Salt for the signing of the papers. Zac does not show up, but Leah signs the papers anyway.
29 May–7 June	Dr. Bailey Voss	Travis Jeffery	Doctor Voss is a psychologist, who meets with John Palmer. John tells him about his brain tumour and how he feels guilty for the fires he started. John believes Doctor Voss is too young and inexperienced to help him, so he leaves. John later returns and Doctor Voss tries to get him to open up about his childhood, but John realises that he cannot recall anything from before he was 12. John informs Doctor Voss that he believes he was responsible for his father's death due to flashback he had. Doctor Voss recommends John tries hypnosis.
30–31 May	Rebecca Brown	Kate Betcher	Rebecca notices VJ Patterson at Salt and approaches him. They flirt with each other and Rebecca asks if they can go somewhere more private. The following morning, VJ asks Rebecca to leave, as his mother is in the house. He offers to get her a taxi. Rebecca introduces herself to Alf Stewart before she leaves.
31 May–22 June	Bede Hadden	Bill Young	Bede finds John and Jett Palmer outside his home. Jett explains that John used to live there and Bede invites them inside. When John mentions his surname is Palmer, Bede takes him to his father's grave and reveals that George Palmer died in a fire. Bede later comes to Summer Bay and brings John a box of things he found in his attic.
31 May–8 June	Young John Palmer	Rex Palazzi	John Palmer recalls a memory of himself carrying a petrol can, shortly before a fire killed his father. John later recalls that he found his father after he shot himself, and his mother asked him to help cover it up by starting a fire.
8 June	Enid Palmer	Megan O'Connell	John Palmer recalls a memory of him and his mother Enid covering up his father's suicide by setting a fire. Enid asks John to keep it quiet, as they will never be able to escape the shame.
14 June–4 October	Jay Turner	Aidan Gillett	Justin and Mason Morgan go to Jay's drug den to find their brother Brody Morgan. Jay tells them he has not seen Brody, but Justin and Mason later force their way inside. Jay attempts to hit Justin with a pool cue, but Mason punches him. Months later, Jay is brought into the Yabbie Creek police station, where he realises Brody has told the police about him. He accuses Brody of stabbing him with a screwdriver. Justin comes to Jay's house to ask him to stop lying about Brody. After the police find the screwdriver at Jay's house with his fingerprints on it, he tells them that he accidentally fell on it.
14–15 June	Bruno Addlen	Johnny Nasser	Bruno comes to Summer Bay looking for Scarlett Snow. He asks Alf Stewart if he knows her whereabouts, but Alf tells him that he just missed her. Bruno eventually catches up with Scarlett and it emerges he is a private investigator hired to find her by her husband. Bruno asks Scarlett for $8000 to keep her whereabouts a secret and she pays him. Before he leaves, Bruno remarks that if he can find her, so can someone else.
20 June	Des Green	Kirk Dodd	Des leads a Narctoics Anonymous meeting, which Brody Morgan attends.
21 June	Anton Shields	David Woodland	Anton runs the following NA meeting, where Brody Morgan finally admits that he is an addict.
26 June–11 September	Max Snow	Addison Price	Scarlett Snow listens to a voicemail from her son Max asking her when she is coming home. Scarlett tells Justin Morgan that her son died a year ago. Scarlett suffers flashbacks that show Max died after falling from a tree and hitting his head. Scarlett found him dead in his bed the following morning.
4–20 July	Peggy King	Caroline Gillmer	Peggy is Hunter King's grandmother, who comes to Summer Bay after her tries to contact her. Hunter informs Peggy that Zac MacGuire is not his father and Peggy leaves when Hunter calls his mother, Charlotte, a liar. Peggy tells Hunter that she knows about the Pier Diner robbery and she blames him for ruining Charlotte's life. Hunter's girlfriend Olivia Fraser Richards talks with Peggy and explains how Hunter has matured, before asking her not to go to the police about the robbery. Peggy reacts badly to Olivia's plea and tells the police that Hunter committed the Diner robbery. Olivia and Hunter apologise to Peggy, who also apologises to them for going to the police. Hunter and Peggy agree to start afresh and spend time together, with Peggy also helping to find his father. Peggy tells Hunter that she suspects her former neighbour Wally could be his father.
6 July	Constable Anderson	Jon Scholten	Anderson is a PI hired to track down Scarlett Snow. She offers to double his fee to leave, but he tells her has already been paid and gives her a letter from her husband. Anderson learns, via a bug in Scarlett's caravan, that Justin Morgan is helping her to leave town. Anderson and his associate try to stop them, but Scarlett and Justin escape.
13 July–18 December	Jarrod McGregor	Joel Davies	Jarrod is Ziggy Astoni's boyfriend. She makes a surprise visit only to find him in bed with someone else. Jarrod goes after Ziggy and they argue, before she leaves with Brody Morgan. Months later, Jarrod comes to Summer Bay to see Ziggy. He tells her that he wants her back. Jarrod brings his bike to Summer Bay Auto just to see Ziggy. They later take an old Triumph car for a test drive and Jarrod kisses her. He apologises and offers to just be friends. Ziggy continues to spend time with Jarrod, but she eventually tells him that while she forgive him for cheating on her, they are done as a couple.
13 July	Random Girl	Emma Sabjan	Ziggy Astoni finds her boyfriend Jarrod in bed with the girl.
20 July	Tom	Joel Hogan	Tom flirts with Scarlett Snow in Salt and Justin Morgan warns him off.
31 July–4 September	Wally Burns	Julian Garner	Peggy King suspects her former neighbour Wally is Hunter King's father. After Hunter sends him a letter, which he returns, Wally comes to Summer Bay and eventually meets Hunter. When Hunter expresses his happiness that he has found him, Wally tells him that he cannot be his father, as he is infertile. Wally and Hunter later have dinner together and Wally tells Hunter stories about his mother Charlotte King. The following day, Hunter asks Wally for a DNA test, as there is still a chance he could be his father. Wally takes Hunter's DNA records and asks him not to contact him again. A few days later, Wally returns and tells Hunter a DNA test confirmed that he is Hunter's father. Hunter tries to bond with Wally, but realises they do not have much in common. Wally lies to his wife that he is at a conference. Wally visits Hunter again, but they still struggle to bond over their respective interests. Wally's wife Claire follows him to the Bay and accuses Leah Patterson of having an affair with Wally, but Leah tells her the truth about Hunter. Wally later meets with Hunter to apologise and they agree to meet up when things improve between Wally and Claire. Wally gives Hunter a cheque for $50,000, but Hunter rejects it after realising Claire does not want him around. He then asks Wally for another chance to get to know him, but they still to struggle to bond. Wally overhears Hunter saying he wish he had not gone looking for his father, and Wally agrees. They decide to stop forcing a relationship between them and Wally leaves town.
10 August–14 September	Doctor Simms	Ed Wightman	Doctor Simms attempts to take Mason Morgan off the ventilator, but he suffers respiratory arrest. Doctor Simms tells Tori Morgan that the spinal shock obviously has not warn off and they will try again in a couple of days. Mason later wakes up and Doctor Simms carries a series of tests on his sensations and reflexes. Weeks later, Doctor Simms assesses Mason's progress and decides that he can be discharged.
10 August	Norris	Gavin Fenwick Christensen	Martin Ashford meets Norris to get an address for William Zannis.
14 August	Counsellor Kathryn	Sarah Amanious	After Kathryn finishes up a group session at the rehab facility attended by Brody Morgan, she encourages him to talk at the next one. She later asks him about the hallucinations he suffered while he was taking drugs. At the next session, Kathryn asks the patients to open up about their triggers.
14 August	Addict Lisa	Ashley Avci	Lisa attends group sessions along with Brody Morgan at a rehab facility.
14 August	Mackenzie	Luke Davis	Mackenzie spots Raffy Morrison sitting at the bus stop and offers to drive her home. She accepts and gets into the car, but Mackenzie then makes advances towards her by putting his hand on her leg. She tells him she will get the bus, but Mackenzie accelerates away. As Raffy begs to be let out of the car, Robbo catches up to them and forces Mackenzie to pull over. Raffy gets out and Mackenzie drives off.
16 August	Surfer	Finlay Upton	The surfer notices John Palmer with Luc Patterson and calls him "Grandpa" as he walks past.
17–21 August	Claire Burns	Di Adams	Claire comes to the Beach House looking for her husband Wally, and accuses Leah Patterson of having an affair with him. When Wally arrives, he introduces Hunter King as the son of a friend, but Leah then tells Claire that Hunter is Wally's son.
22 August, 18 December	Felicity Cox	Amali Golden	Felicity is a potential buyer for Salt. Justin Morgan shows her around the restaurant and advises her to come back during the dinner service. Felicity makes it clear that she interested in Justin and kisses him. Four months later, Justin and Brody Morgan meet with Felicity and asks her to sell Salt back to them. She offers to do so at double the price they sold it for. When Justin attempts to flirt with Felicity, she raises the price by $50,000. Brody meets with Felicity later that day and he brings Willow Harris along, who reveals that she knows that Felicity has committed fraud. Felicity sells Salt back to Brody.
22 August 2017 – 21 March 2018	Nick Dutton	Jacob Allan	Nick and his friends come into the Pier Diner and overhear Leah Patterson telling Roo Stewart that she think she has run out of romantic chances, so he asks her out on a date. Nick tells her he has been through a messy break up recently too. Leah turns him down, as she is not ready, but Nick tells her he will check in on her again soon. Nick is called to the high school to collect his daughter Jennifer, after she is suspended for fighting. Nick returns to the diner and invites Leah to have a coffee with him. Ben Astoni comes to see Nick after learning that he applied for the pier to be heritage listed, but they argue and Nick leaves. Months later, Nick drops Jennifer off at the beach and notices her with Hunter King. He later returns to pick her up at the Diner, but Leah tells him Jennifer is at the university with her boyfriend, Hunter. Nick finds Jennifer and accuses Hunter of buying her alcohol. He tells Hunter to stay away from his daughter, before taking her home. Jennifer runs away from home and moves in with Hunter. Days later, Jennifer moves back with Nick after her relationship with Hunter is over.
22 August	Tyson	Indigo Felton	Along with Nick Dutton, Tyson and Paul overhear Leah Patterson bemoaning her lack of romantic chances and they both agree that they would ask her out.
22 August	Paul	John Van Putten	Along with Nick Dutton, Tyson and Paul overhear Leah Patterson bemoaning her lack of romantic chances and they both agree that they would ask her out.
22 August	Polygraph Examiner	Gregg Arthur	The Polygraph Examiner interviews Robbo, who is suffering from amnesia.
28 August–6 September	Faz	Jesse Rowles	Faz helps William Zannis to kidnap and hold Ziggy Astoni hostage. After Brody Morgan joins them, Faz also tries to force him to drink alcohol and take drugs. When Kat Chapman enters the room, Faz hits her over the head with a vase, knocking her unconscious. He and Bob take Ziggy and Brody outside, but they are attacked by Robbo. Ziggy later suffers a flashback to when Faz kidnapped her.
30 August	Bob	Neal Horton	Bob is called to a motel to pick up William Zannis and Faz, and help them move Ziggy Astoni and Brody Morgan to a new location. As he and Faz go outside, they are attacked by Robbo.
4 September–17 October	Dr Pandza	Oliver Wenn	Dr Pandza is Beth Ellis's doctor. When she returns to her hospital room for treatment, he advises her to take things easy. A few days later, Dr Pandza is preparing to perform a procedure on Beth when Mason Morgan opens the door and learns she is a patient, not a nurse.
11 September	Rose Wagner	Jacqui Duncan	Kat Chapman shows Rose a photo of Robbo, and asks her if she knows him, but Rose denies seeing him before.
12 September	Trish	Jeannie Gee	Trish watches on as police enter the home of her deceased neighbour, Rose. Kat Chapman asks Trish if she knows Robbo, and Trish tells her that while she has seen him with Rose, she does not know his name.
21 September	Leon	Maxime Etienne	Leon is a tattoo artist, who is asked by Mason Morgan to come to Summer Bay and tattoo himself and Beth Ellis.
25 September–5 October	Colin	Ben Barber	While waiting in the queue at the Pier Diner, Colin is approached by Tori Morgan, who flirts with him and asks him on a date. Colin accepts and suggests they go to Salt. The date goes well until they are interrupted by Martin Ashford, causing Colin to leave. Tori contacts Colin a week later to arrange another date. He soon realises that Tori is not into him and decides to leave. He helps Ash's date Liz with her pram and they decide to get a drink together somewhere else.
26 September	Sergeant Halac	Louise Kelly	Sergeant Halac allows Kat Chapman to take the lead when the police raid Dylan Carter's house. Sergeant Halac alerts Kat to a wall covered in pictures and newspapers clippings of her.
28 September	Photographer	Lance Bonza	The photographer is invited to take pictures at Olivia Fraser Richards' launch party for her fashion label.
3 October	Junkie	Ellen Harvey	The junkie answers the door to Scarlett Snow when she calls at Jay Turner's drug den. Scarlett tells her that she is there to pick something up and offers the junkie money to go and get them cigarettes.
4 October	Mate #1	Peter Sammak	Jay Turner's mate comes to his house to drink beer and play pool with him.
5 October	Liz	Margarita Merkel	Martin Ashford bumps into Liz and her son Phoenix's pram. After he fixes the broken wheel, Liz asks him out for a coffee and a play date for their children. Ash takes her to Salt, but is distracted when Tori Morgan arrives. Liz decides to leave when she realises that Ash likes Tori. Colin helps her with the pram and she suggests they go and get a drink somewhere else.
5 October	Baby Phoenix	River and Ryder Srhoj	Martin Ashford bumps into Liz and her son Phoenix's pram. After he fixes the broken wheel, Liz asks him out for a coffee and a play date for their children. Ash takes her to Salt, but is distracted when Tori Morgan arrives. Liz decides to leave when she realises that Ash likes Tori. Colin helps her with the pram and she suggests they go and get a drink somewhere else.
5–23 October	Alan Ellis	Blair McDonough	Alan is spending time with his daughter Beth Ellis when Mason Morgan approaches them and introduces himself as Beth's boyfriend. Beth apologises to her father for the way he found out about her relationship. Alan invites Mason to brunch and they are joined by his wife Jackie. After brunch, Alan tells Mason to stay away from Beth. He later comes to Mason's home, where Beth confronts him about what he said. Mason tells Alan that they both want Beth to be happy, and they sit down and talk. Beth is later rushed to the hospital, and Alan tells Mason to stay away. When Beth wakes up, she asks her parents to let Mason see her. Jackie convinces Alan to give them some time alone together. The Ellis' are later informed that Beth's heart is failing and she is now top of the transplant list. When Beth's heart stops, Alan blames Mason for taking her out. Beth dies shortly after of a sudden fatal arrhythmia and Tori tells Alan and Jackie that it could have happened anytime. They later make a complaint against Mason for acting inappropriately.
5–23 October	Jackie Ellis	Rachael Coopes	
9 October	Prosecutor	Cameron Rhodes	The prosecutor in Brody Morgan's trial details his drug use and how it affected his family and community, before asking for a custodial sentence of six years, with a minimum four-year non-parole period.
9–31 October	Caleb Snow	Josh McConville	Caleb is Scarlett Snow's estranged husband, who arrives unexpectedly in Summer Bay. Caleb tells Scarlett that he wanted to see how she was following the anniversary of their son's death. They meet the following day and Caleb apologises for blaming her for Max's death. He also tells her he seeing a counsellor. Caleb and Scarlett agree to stop being angry with each other and decide to work through their issues, so they can move on. They meet up for dinner and Caleb gives Scarlett Max's favourite stuffed toy. He tells her he misses and loves her. Caleb leaves town, but returns when Scarlett is injured in an explosion. He tells Justin Morgan to stay away from her and helps Scarlett when she is discharged. Scarlett tells Caleb that she has feelings for Justin, but he responds by kissing her and asking her to return home. Scarlett agrees and she and Caleb leave the Bay.
10 October	Pete	Sam Woods	Maggie Astoni suffers a flashback to the moment she was pushed over by Pete at her previous school.
11 October	Waiter	Adam Boys	The waiter serves Robbo and Kat Chapman when they visit a restaurant in the city.
11 October–22 November	Dennis Novak	Mirko Grillini	Novak uses a drone to spy on Robbo and Kat Chapman while they are in the city. He calls his contact to let them know he has found Robbo. Dennis rents a caravan at the park Robbo is staying, and breaks into Robbo's caravan. He soon realises that Robbo does not recognise him. He speaks to his contact, and later follows Robbo, Kat Chapman, Scarlett Snow and Justin Morgan to a cabin in the bush, where he poses as a maintenance man and plants a bomb. After it explodes, Dennis kidnaps Kat and plans to kill her for testifying against Dylan Carter, but Robbo interrupts him and Dennis runs off. When Robbo catches him, Dennis tells him they served together and his name is Beckett Reid. Dennis hits Robbo with a rock and leaves. The police later track Dennis down, but he escapes them. Robbo learns that was he was hired to kill Kat after tracking Dennis to an old garage. Dennis is informed that Kat is testifying after all, so he kidnaps her at gunpoint and makes her drive to a wreckers yard, where he ties her up inside a car and attempts to crush it. Robbo stops him in time and ties him up, before placing him in the boot of a car. Robbo later returns to the yard, where he learns that it was his dumping ground. Dennis gets free, but is shot while he and Robbo are fighting. Robbo buries his body on the headland across from The Diner. His body is later discovered by Ryder Jackson and Raffy Morrison.
12 October	Shelley	Hannah Goodwin	Shelley meets with Olivia Fraser Richards to get paid for sewing some clothes for Olivia's business.
12 October	Guard	David Nicoll	The guard at the Northern Districts psychiatric facility allows Martin Ashford to visit Mick Jennings, after Ash tells him he is Mick's brother and has a message for him.
16 October	Parole Assessor	Kate Bookallil	The parole assessor interviews Mick Jennings, and listens to him as he admits responsibility for his actions and asks for a chance to prove himself.
17 October	Elle Gilbert	Liz Bardot	Elle is brought into the local hospital after suffering a severe head injury in a car accident. Her scans show that she has irreversible brain function and her husband Brendan has to choose when to switch off her life support.
17–23 October	Brendan Gilbert	Thomas Filer	Brendan comes to the hospital to see his wife Elle, who has been involved in a car accident. He is told that she has suffered a brain injury that she will not recover from. Brendan chooses not to honour Elle's wishes to donate her organs and gets angry at Mason Morgan who tries to get him to change his mind. Mason later apologises to Brendan and invites him to meet his girlfriend Beth Ellis, who needs a heart transplant, but Brendan cannot bring himself to see her. He asks for more time before switching off Elle's life support. Brendan later sees Mason bringing in Beth, who is suffering breathing difficulties. He tells Mason that he has changed his mind about donating Elle's organs, but it is too late for Beth, who dies. Tori tells him that Elle's organs will save the lives of eight other people.
19 October	Dr Lang	Zoe Carides	Dr Lang and Oliver are members of the hospital board, who meet with Mason Morgan after Brendan Gilbert makes a complaint against him. They opt to fire Mason from his hospital placement.
19 October	Oliver Brisbane	Todd Goddard	Dr Lang and Oliver are members of the hospital board, who meet with Mason Morgan after Brendan Gilbert makes a complaint against him. They opt to fire Mason from his hospital placement.
23 October	Nurse Lee	Adam Dunn	Nurse Lee assists Tori Morgan in her attempts to resuscitate Beth Ellis.
23 October	Pete Sands	Benjamin Dillon-Smith	Pete is Mick Jennings' caseworker, who asks Mick's mother Irene Roberts to visit him at the halfway house. As he shows Irene to Mick's room, Pete informs her that Mick has been involved in an altercation.
24–25 October	Curtis	Taylor Wiese	Curtis approaches Ziggy Astoni in a bar and asks if he can buy her a drink, but she rejects his offer. He then answers her phone and speaks to Olivia Fraser Richards, before Ziggy takes it back. She later joins Curtis and his friend Macca for a round of drinks and Curtis spikes her beer. When she attempts to leave, Ziggy finds herself unable to walk properly and Curtis takes her outside to an alley way, where he attempts to assault her. He runs off when Brody Morgan approaches.
24 October	Macca	Zac Deane	Macca tells his friend Curtis that he wants to leave the bar they are in, but later joins him and Ziggy Astoni for drinks.
1–22 November 2017, 9–18 July 2018	Diana Walford	Sarah Chadwick	Diana is Maggie Astoni's mother, who turns up in the Bay to visit her family, after Maggie asks her for money to bail out her husband Ben Astoni from jail. Diana senses the family are keeping things from her and her granddaughter Coco Astoni reveals the personal struggles they have all faced. Diana vows to stay on for a week. When she interferes in Ben's plans for his and Maggie's wedding anniversary, Ben says he will not put up with it any more and insults her. He apologises to Diana the following day, and asks for her help in organising a vow renewal ceremony. Diana overhears the family discussing how much she is annoying them and when they are going to ask her to leave. She later admits to Ben that her former husband, Richard, has a 27-year-old girlfriend, and that she feels humiliated and lonely. Maggie later tells Diana that Richard is getting married. Diana decides to sell up and move to the Bay, but changes her mind when Coco offers to stay with her for a while.
6 November 2017 – 28 February 2018	Axel Boyd	Matthew Pearce	Axel meets Olivia Fraser Richards at Salt, after she complains that her dresses are being sold on the fashion website he works for. He apologises and explains that when he learned that a low level designer copied her designs, they were fired. He then offers Olivia a deal to buy one of her designs. When Olivia meets with him again to discuss the contract, Axel invites her to the company headquarters in Melbourne. After the trip, Olivia meets with Axel to show him some new designs. She introduces him to her boyfriend Hunter King, who attempts to ask questions about the contract, but Olivia shuts him down. Axel later tells Olivia that he thinks Hunter will hold her back. When Axel arranges a photoshoot and interview for Olivia at Salt, he suggests that Hunter leaves, as he is a distraction. Axel flatters Olivia over drinks and then kisses her. Olivia tells him their relationship should stay purely business, as she loves Hunter. After learning that Olivia meet with a rep from another website, he tells her that their deal is terminated and if she sells her designs to a competitor, she will be sued. Olivia goes to Axel's motel room to apologise and they have sex. Axel then offers to talk to his bosses and smooth things over. He later tells Olivia that his bosses have agreed to give her a second chance and they work on more designs together.
9 November	Judy Lawson	Annie Byron	Judy comes to Summer Bay Auto to pick up her car. Mason Morgan makes her tea, while they wait for Justin Morgan to return. Ziggy Astoni refuses to accept payment from Judy, telling her it was only a loose exhaust bracket, and Judy leaves happy.
16 November–5 December 2017, 19 April 2018	Boyd Easton	Steve Le Marquand	Boyd comes to Willow Harris's home and demands his money back. Willow admits that she does not have it, but will get it to him soon. They are interrupted by Justin Morgan, who tells Boyd that he found his money and gave it to the police. Boyd tells Willow to get him the money and he leaves. Boyd later shows up at Justin's house looking for Willow, and he gives them 24 hours to give him his money. Boyd chases Willow to Summer Bay Auto and trashes the garage when he cannot find her or Justin. Boyd later pushes Willow's father down some stairs and admits it to Justin, who provokes Boyd into beating him up. Boyd is soon arrested. After he is paroled, Boyd and his mother Hazel Easton kidnap Justin's daughter Ava Gilbert. Boyd later contacts Willow to arrange collection of a ransom. Boyd hands over Ava to Willow, who tells her to run to the police and Boyd realises he has been set up. He grabs Willow, but he is tackled to the ground by Dean Thompson. Boyd manages to get back in the car and drives at Dean. Colby Thorne shoots him and Boyd clips Dean, before coming to a stop. He dies of his injuries in the hospital.
16 November	Sidney Cheng	Lucy Goleby	Sidney is a lawyer hired by Martin Ashford, Irene Roberts and Leah Patterson to help them in a custody case against Mick Jennings.
27 November–18 December	DI Will Shepherd	Josef Ber	DI Shepherd leads a special task force investigation into Dennis Novak and the local police corruption case. He pulls Robbo in for questioning about his actions on the day Novak kidnapped Constable Kat Chapman. Robbo tells Shepherd and DI Vincent that he did not report the incident straight away, as he went back to the wreckers yard to find Novak, but Novak had gone. Shepherd and Vincent plan to accompany Kat to the city, so she can testify in the corruption trial, but Robbo convinces them to let Kat do it via video-link. Shepherd returns when Novak's body is discovered. He questions Kat and Robbo.
28 November–18 December	DI Liz Vincent	Natasha Beaumont	
28 November	Truck Driver	Steven Riley	The truck driver attempts to deliver goods to the bait shop, but is briefly stopped and his truck searched by police. Robbo hides a phone underneath the truck.
30 November	Naomi	Sabrina Brandon	Naomi is a stylist, who helps Olivia Fraser Richards get ready for a fashion showcase.
30 November	Tulli	Ayeshah Rose	Axel Boyd introduces Tulli to Olivia Fraser Richards, and she compliments Olivia on her fashion designs.
30 November	Gabriella	Sarah Jane Kelly	Gabriella is the creative director for The Find, a fashion website that Olivia Fraser Richards designs for. She introduces Gabriella to her boyfriend Hunter King and Mason Morgan.
30 November	Prosecutor	Monette Lee	The prosecutor in the trial for police corruption questions Kat Chapman about why she wanted to testify via video-link.
4 December	Ambulance Officer	Emily Taylor	The ambulance officer brings Russell Harris to the Northern Districts Hospital and informs Tori Morgan that he had a fall and has suffered a laceration to the head.
4 December 2017 – 6 March 2018, 26 February 2019	Russell Harris	Monroe Reimers	Willow Harris's father. He suffers from Alzheimer's disease, and is rushed to hospital after being pushed down some stairs. When he wakes up, Russell mistakes his daughter for his wife and Justin Morgan for his brother Bobby. Months later, Russell takes Willow's car, which previously belonged to him, and drives to the beach. Colby Thorne finds him and calls Willow, who decides to take Russell out for a drive at Colby's suggestion. After Willow is shot, Justin brings Russell to the hospital to see her when her condition worsens. As he leaves, Russell tells Willow's friend Dean Thompson to look after her.
5 December	Trend Rep	Caroline Attwood	The Trend rep meets with Olivia Fraser Richards about her fashion designs, and she tells Olivia that Trend look forward to doing business with her.
6 December	Forensic Officer	Leanne Mauro	The forensic officer takes photographs of Dennis Novak's body that has washed up in a cove. She tells Sergeant Phillip McCarthy that it is difficult to determine how long the body has been there.
13 December	Marli Lewis	Sophie Cook	Marli is the head of fashion brand The Find. She meets with Olivia Fraser Richards to discuss her new designs and whether she has a future with the company following her meeting with another label. Olivia apologises for her mistake and Marli welcomes her back.
14 December	Mark	Clayton Adams	Mark meets with Willow Harris at Salt to discuss signing up for a gym membership. While training together, Mark flirts with and attempts to kiss Willow. Justin Morgan walks in and punches Mark after being goaded by him.
