= The Mountaineers =

The Mountaineers may refer to:

- The Mountaineers (club), an American mountaineering club
- The Mountaineers (band), a Welsh pop group
- The Mountaineers (opera), an English romantic opera by Guy Eden and Reginald Somerville
- The Mountaineers (film), a 1924 silent German film directed by Arnold Fanck

== See also ==
- Mountaineer (disambiguation)
