= Mountie (disambiguation) =

A Mountie is a constable of the Royal Canadian Mounted Police.

Mountie or Mounties may also refer to:

== People ==
- Jacques Rougeau (born 1960), a Canadian professional wrestler who performed as "The Mountie"
- Mounties (band), a Canadian indie rock band

== Film ==
- The Mountie (film), a 2011 Canadian film

== School mascots and team names ==
Canada

- Mount Allison Mounties, Mount Allison University, Sackville, New Brunswick

United States

- Mapleton High School (Ashland, Ohio)
- Mount Saint Charles Academy, Woonsocket, Rhode Island
- Montclair High School (New Jersey)
- Northwest High School (Michigan), Jackson, Michigan
- Suffern High School, Suffern, New York
- Rogers High School (Arkansas), Rogers, Arkansas

== Sports clubs ==
- Lethbridge Mounties, now the Lethbridge Black Diamonds, a minor-league baseball team in Lethbridge, Alberta, Canada
- Paris Mounties, a junior ice hockey team in Paris, Ontario, Canada
- Vancouver Mounties, a defunct minor-league baseball club in Vancouver, British Columbia, Canada
- The Mounties Club, an athletic club in Mount Pritchard, New South Wales, Australia, whose teams include:
  - Mount Pritchard Mounties, a rugby league team in the Bundaberg Red Cup
  - Mounties F.C., now Mounties Wanderers, a football (soccer) club in the NSW State League Division One

== See also ==
- Mountaineer (disambiguation), for other athletic teams whose name is often shortened to Mounties
