= The Blue Mountain Gazette =

Australian newspaper, 1903–1904

The Blue Mountain Gazette was a newspaper launched in Katoomba, New South Wales, Australia, in January 1903.

== History ==
In January 1903 The Blue Mountain Gazette was launched by E. D. Wilson, who set up his business on Main Street, Katoomba. Twelve months later, in January 1904, Wilson sold his interest in the paper to Robert Gornall. Gornall sold to John Knight of The Mountaineer in December 1904 and transferred his printing plant "to a prosperous and rapidly rising mining and agricultural town in the north, where there is no newspaper". The Gazette, which had circulated throughout the Blue Mountains and adjoining areas, was incorporated with The Mountaineer.

== Digitisation ==
The Blue Mountain Gazette has been digitised as part of the Australian Newspapers Digitisation Program project of the National Library of Australia.

== See also ==
- List of newspapers in New South Wales
- List of newspapers in Australia
