= Maggie Astoni =

Fictional character

- Home and Away character
- Portrayed by: Kestie Morassi
- Duration: 2017–2020
- First appearance: 21 June 2017
- Last appearance: 14 July 2020
- Introduced by: Lucy Addario
In-universe information
- Occupation: Principal of Summer Bay High
- Father: Richard Walford
- Mother: Diana Walford
- Sisters: Kate Walford
- Husband: Ben Astoni
- Daughters: Ziggy Astoni; Coco Astoni
- Granddaughters: Izzy Thompson

Maggie Astoni is a fictional character from the Australian television soap opera Home and Away, played by Kestie Morassi. The character made her first screen appearance on 21 June 2017. Maggie arrives in Summer Bay and takes a job as the School Principal of Summer Bay High. She is characterised as a protective mother and career woman. The Astonis are Home and Away's first nuclear family to join the soap opera in 17 years, since the arrival of the Sutherlands in 2000. The show had long been missing traditional parent-child stories and used them to fill that void. Maggie was introduced alongside her husband Ben Astoni (Rohan Nichol) and their two daughters Coco (Anna Cocquerel) and Ziggy Astoni (Sophie Dillman). Maggie decides to move to the town to offer her family a happier future. Maggie and Ben married when they were young and her mother did not approve of him. Morassi has described the Astoni marriage as a strong union, noting that they still have "passion and electricity" in their relationship.

Maggie's main stories have focussed on her various health issues. Firstly her battle to overcome Posttraumatic stress disorder following a robbery, was focused on in her introductory months. Then followed a long-running storyline exploring the effects of living with lymphoma cancer. Maggie was diagnosed with the illness following a bout of ill health. She underwent courses of chemotherapy, two stem cell transplants, fought pneumonia, faced death after the cancer had spread and shaved her head. The character ended the 2018 season being told she had entered remission. Morassi has been praised by viewers and critics for her portrayal of the illness and was nominated for two Digital Spy Reader Awards. The character departed the show on 14 July 2020.

== Casting ==
Morassi's casting was revealed in early 2017 when she was pictured filming on set, while her character details were announced on 4 June. Morassi originally auditioned for another role in Home and Away but was unsuccessful. Three weeks later she was invited back to audition for the role of Maggie. When she won the job she relocated from Melbourne to Sydney to accommodate her filming commitments. Morassi told Luke Dennehy of Herald Sun that it took some time for her to get used to the fast-paced filming schedule of the show. She commented, "it was definitely a shock to the system. I'm mostly used to working on film, where you have a lot more time for rehearsals. With film you are shooting maybe three minutes a day, whereas here, you are shooting almost an episode a day." Morassi found playing Maggie "one of the most enjoyable experiences" of her career. The character made her first appearance on 21 June 2017.

== Development ==
=== Family ===
Maggie moves to Summer Bay with her husband Ben Astoni (Rohan Nichol) and their two daughters Coco (Anna Cocquerel) and Ziggy Astoni (Sophie Dillman). The Astonis are the first nuclear family to join the soap opera in 17 years, since the arrival of the Sutherlands in 2000. Seth Adamson from TV Soap detailed that the family had begun to experience drama in their city lifestyle and decided to move to Summer Bay for a quieter life. Maggie was certain the town could offer them an easier living and guaranteed them happy future. Maggie convinces Ben to move to Summer Bay following a job vacancy at Summer Bay High. Ziggy and Coco are initially reluctant to settle in the town. The Astonis move into The Farmhouse after the landlord decides to sell the property. The show used them to play out parent-child stories the show had not featured for some time. Maggie and Ben are portrayed as having a strong and passionate relationship despite being together for many years. Morassi opined "she's lucky in that her marriage is strong and she has unwavering support in her husband Ben. They were childhood sweethearts and they've managed to keep the spark in their relationship alive."

One of the family's first big stories revolves around Coco's eating disorder. She ends up being hospitalised and forbids Maggie from being told the cause of her collapse. Cocquerel told Alison James from Soaplife that Coco believes she has her condition under control and does not want her parents to know. Maggie and Ben eventually find out the truth and the actress added that the reveal has "serious repercussions for the Astoni family." When Coco begins dating Ryder Jackson (Lukas Radovich) the family are supportive of them. Cocquerel told an Inside Soap reporter that she liked the Astoni family's supportive and close bond. She added "the best thing about them is that they are always there for each other - it's the Astoni way, Coco knows she has an incredible family who will all support her through anything."

Another story which helped convey Maggie and Ben's strong relationship was a surprise vow renewal organised by Ben. After various dramas in their introductory months, Ben decides that arranging the vow renewal ceremony will help their relationship. However the introduction of Maggie's overbearing mother Diana Walford (Sarah Chadwick) causes problems. Diana had always disapproved of Ben and tries to mar his efforts to make the ceremony happen. Diana eventually decides to support them and Maggie arrives at the ceremony blindfolded. Maggie is happy when she discovers what Ben has done for her and more so that her mother is in attendance. Morassi told a New Idea reporter that "having Diana there to support her as well makes the whole thing very special. Maggie is known to hate surprises, but this was one that knocked her socks off in a great way."

After one year on-screen, Morassi believed that the Astoni family had been successful additions to the show. She told Sarah Ellis from Inside Soap that "the Astonis have struck a chord with a lot of viewers. It's really about the family unit. They're so tight, and they are confronted with issues that every normal family goes through in one way or another." The family also had believable chemistry when in scenes together. Morassi credited this to their off-screen bond they had worked hard to forge. She added that in their own time they often had dinner parties around each other's houses and have games nights, which made them closer friends.

=== Characterisation ===
Maggie, might look like any other suburban mother and career woman, but there's also a certain edge to her. A 'fly in the face of convention' attitude, that saw her fall for the local bad boy and turn her back on an affluent lifestyle and upbringing.

— An excerpt taken from the official Home and Away website.

The character's backstory details that she had an affluent upbringing with her mother Diana. Maggie met Ben who was the "local bad boy" and decided to leave her affluent lifestyle behind to start a family. Diana was not supportive of her life choices. A writer for TVNZ said that she "has a certain edge to her" and is "intelligent and caring". Maggie is characterised as the mother and career woman of the nuclear Astoni family. She loves her family but unafraid of "discipline and fighting for what's fair." She began a career as a teacher before progressing to the role of the principal at Summer Bay High. Morassi told a writer from 7plus that "Maggie is like a lot of working mothers out there. She's juggling family and work life with little time for herself. She's not perfect, but she's doing the best she can 100% of the time."

Maggie takes her responsibility as a mother seriously and will do anything to keep her two troubled teenagers safe. The actress enjoyed playing the lovingly "fierce" and "strong working mother" role and believed it made the job a great experience. Morassi believed that Maggie was similar to herself because of their shared love of teaching. Morassi had been a teacher as side career between acting roles. She added that the character is "happily married with two kids and living my 'sea change' dream."

=== Posttraumatic stress disorder ===
Writers created a Posttraumatic stress disorder (PTSD) story for Maggie. The issue based storyline began following a break-in at Summer Bay High, when student Raffy Morrison (Olivia Deeble) smashes her way into the school and brings back painful memories for Maggie. She is working late at school when Raffy throws a brick through a window and sneaks around the school corridors. The incident scares Maggie and as she investigates the break-in she has flashbacks of her past. Morassi told a reporter from Inside Soap that her character has a form of PTSD which developed following a break-in at a previous school. Maggie was attacked and left with a serious concussion. Her attacker was never caught which left her with vulnerable. Morassi explained "when that's the case, victims can find it hard to feel safe. Now a familiar scenario is playing out right in front of Maggie, triggering the anxiety."

When Maggie discovers that Raffy is behind the break-in she decides to let her off. The actress explained that Maggie is a "level-headed and fair" woman and can see that Raffy was pulling a prank that went wrong. In episodes that followed a terrified Maggie recalls details of the previous attack. Morassi added that Maggie still has PTSD related migraines and knowing that her original attacker was not apprehended "unnerves her".

Ziggy soon confesses that she was involved in the incident that left Maggie with PTSD. Another incident occurs when Maggie gets a flat tyre and Mick Jennings (Kristian Schmid) helps her change it. Mick cuts his hand and Maggie takes him back to her house to bandage it. When Olivia Fraser Richards (Raechelle Banno) sees Mick, she tells Maggie that he is a rapist. Ben hears screams from the house and violently throws Mick out. The incident forces Maggie and Ziggy to discuss the original break-in and Maggie forgives Ziggy, but tells her she cannot forget about it.

=== Cancer ===
Producers created a Lymphoma cancer story for Maggie, which began to develop on-screen from early 2018. Morassi was happy that the writing team had entrusted an issue lead storyline to her. She described the opportunity as "incredible" because she believed all actors relish the chance to portray emotionally charged stories. She also felt honoured to show how Maggie copes with an illness that effects so many people. The actress added "it's an honour to represent something millions have struggled with. I hope viewers can relate to, and find solace in, the Astonis' journey." She also researched the illness using the internet, watching videos and talking to people. She also looked into the effects it had on relatives off cancer patients. She was happy that the writers had included so much "realism and respect" in scripts. The actress also became an ambassador for Cancer Council Australia's "Daffodil Day" charity event. Nichol, who plays Ben felt that playing such emotional scenes with Morassi was easy because they were close friends, but he admitted that it had been a tiring experience.

The story begins when Maggie is taken into hospital when Ben finds her collapsed under the local pier. She is later taken ill once again and this time her doctor Tori Morgan (Penny McNamee) informs her she may have cancer. Maggie has a series of tests done and awaits the results. When she learns that she has cancer, Maggie initially decides to keep it a secret from her daughters. She thinks that if they know it would Coco's recovery from bulimia and Ziggy's romance with Brody. Ben warns Maggie that keeping secrets from Coco could also trigger her bulimia and that Ziggy would want to support her mother. Maggie receives the results of a PET scan and is told that they have diagnosed her cancer in its early stages. But they stress that it is an aggressive form of cancer.

Maggie's results reveal that she needs treatment immediately and she attends her first chemotherapy session. After she pretends everything is okay for her family's sake. Maggie later has an emotional moment with Ben where she reveals that she is not coping with her diagnosis. Ben reassures her that she will recover and makes her feel positive about fighting her cancer. When they discover the truth, Ziggy and Coco then offer their support and they see how ill Maggie looks. Maggie is told an effective way to treat her cancer could be a stem cell transplant. Ben is tested but proves to be unsuitable. Tori tells Maggie that Ziggy may be a better option. She is reluctant to put her daughter through the process. Ben convince her to ask Ziggy who immediately agrees to get tested. When Ziggy is proved to be a suitable match, Maggie and Ziggy undergo the stem cell transplant procedure. The side effects coupled with her chemotherapy take their toll on Maggie. She then starts to lose her hair and Coco suggests that she shaves her head to take control of the situation. Maggie eventually agrees and Ziggy shaves her head.

Maggie is hospitalised with pneumonia and then has to undergo another course of chemotherapy. Worried by her deteriorating health, Maggie writes a series of goodbye letters to her family. Ben plans on a romantic holiday, but this gives her time to reflect on her life. Morassi told an Inside Soap columnist that "Maggie is reflective, and feeling very sentimental. With time to think and breathe, she starts to think about the bigger picture, and what might lie ahead for her family." Maggie accepts that she may die from her illness and decides to write the goodbye letters which are only to be read after she dies. Ziggy later finds the letters and is devastated. The actress explained that Maggie's family are "upset and confused" and fear that she has given up fighting her cancer. The letters bring out the harsh reality of the situation which Morassi believed her on-screen family had tried so hard not to think about. In a separate interview with Ellis (also from Inside Soap) the actress said that Maggie does not want to die but becomes more aware how important each living moment is. She wants to fight her illness for herself and her family but her future was uncertain. Morassi concluded that Maggie faces the reality of death because "she's practical and a realist."

Maggie stops her treatment so she can attend Ziggy and Brody's wedding. While on The Morning Show, Morassi defended her character's decision claiming that it is a common reaction in cancer sufferers. She explained that chemotherapy leaves people feeling ill and like Maggie, some people want to feel as well as possible. Following the wedding ceremony Maggie has a nose bleed, collapses and is rushed to hospital. She is informed she needs a more aggressive form of chemotherapy to stand any chance of survival. Maggie eventually agrees to resume her treatment plan. Diana arrives and tells Maggie that she will pay for her to take part in cancer medical trials in Europe. Maggie is tempted but Ben is not happy with the prospect of her travelling around the world while she is so ill. The issue causes an argument among the Astoni family. Nichol stated that his character "is very apprehensive" because he feels Maggie is too ill to travel. He explained that Ben would not be able to cope if Maggie died because she is "the love of his life". Tori researches the trial and advises Maggie to stay in Summer Bay. Adhering to Tori's advice Maggie declines her mother's offer. A Home and Away publicist told a reporter from Soaplife that Diana is "devastated" by Maggie's decision and "the family ends up fighting among themselves". Diana leaves the hospital and refuses to speak to her family. They explained that "Maggie's heartbroken when her mum fails to return her calls, struggling at the rejection while also being in the throes of a brutal round of chemo." Soon enough Maggie receives news that the hospital have found a new stem-cell donor.

The transplant is successful and Maggie goes home to recover. She eventually reaches the point where she is classed as being in remission. Morassi told Kerry Harvey from Stuff.co.nz that Maggie will always be concerned about having a relapse. But her experience with cancer changes her perception of the world and herself. She concluded, "I think it's changed her for the better in that it's given her a new and more profound appreciation for everything." The cancer story proved popular with Home and Away's audience because it resonated with those who have been affected with cancer. Morassi received numerous messages via social media and letters written to her sharing their own cancer stories. She also gained support on social media from fans rooting for the character to overcome cancer. Morassi found the reactions from viewers "very humbling".

=== Departure ===
On 13 July 2020, Morassi confirmed her exit from the serial, as Maggie and Ben leave Summer Bay for Italy. Morassi admitted that she would miss the show, saying "I expected it to be wonderful and exciting, but I didn't expect to fall so deeply in love with the people I worked with. I can't tell you the joy this job has brought me." Morassi liked that the scriptwriters gave her character the chance to return in the future. After separating and reuniting, Ben and Maggie decide on a fresh start in Italy. They leave the Bay after attending a surprise goodbye lunch hosted by their friends. Morassi hoped the couple would be able to work things out properly and grow old together, adding "It's what they've always imagined for their future."

== Reception ==
In the 2018 Digital Spy Reader Awards, Morassi was nominated for "Best Actress" and Maggie's cancer story was nominated for "Best Soap Storyline". Both nominations came in last place with 1.1% and 1.3% of their total votes respectively. A writer from Soaplife praised Maggie's cancer story and stated "during her brave battle with cancer, Maggie Astoni has remained strong for her family, even at the toughest times." A columnist from Inside Soap praised the character and actress stating that "Summer Bay High principal Maggie Astoni has taken to her new seaside home like a duck to water - and the same is true of star Kestie Morassi." Sarah Ellis writing for Inside Soap believed that Home and Away had long been dominated by "disjointed clans" and that it had lacked "parent-child" plots. She said that the "tight-knit" Astoni family changed that. Kerry Harvey from Stuff.co.nz praised Morassi's performance during her cancer story stating "if the response from viewers is anything to go by, Morassi nailed it." Television host Larry Emdur said that many people had been vocal about Morassi deserving a Logie Award nomination for her portrayal of cancer, despite being snubbed.
