= Ben Astoni =

Fictional character in Home and Away

- Home and Away character
- Portrayed by: Rohan Nichol
- Duration: 2017–2020
- First appearance: 20 June 2017
- Last appearance: 14 July 2020
- Introduced by: Lucy Addario
In-universe information
- Occupation: Carpenter; Pier co-owner; Surf shop owner
- Brothers: Marco Astoni
- Wife: Maggie Astoni
- Daughters: Ziggy Astoni; Coco Astoni
- Granddaughters: Izzy Thompson

Ben Astoni is a fictional character from the Australian television soap opera Home and Away, played by Rohan Nichol. The actor felt the offer of the role was good timing, as he was approaching his 40th birthday and feeling unconnected to anything. He previously appeared in the serial as Stafford McRae in 2004. Nichol relocated from Melbourne to Sydney to accommodate his filming commitments, and he began filming alongside his on-screen family in early 2017. Nichol expressed an interest in staying with the show for a long time. He made his first appearance during the episode broadcast on 20 June 2017. Ben is introduced along with his wife Maggie Astoni (Kestie Morassi) and two daughters Ziggy Astoni (Sophie Dillman) and Coco Astoni (Anna Cocquerel), making them the first nuclear family to be introduced to Home and Away in 17 years.

Ben is portrayed as a laidback, loyal, hotheaded family man. He is a carpenter and former professional surfer. Nichol thought Ben was the type of man he shares a beer with, and he felt he could relate to his "daggy" side. The Astoni family relocate to the town of Summer Bay for a fresh start, which Nichol could identify with following his own move. The introduction of the family was a return to parent-child storylines that had not been featured in recent years. The Astoni's closeness and loyalty have been tested numerous times, with issues ranging from Coco's eating disorder, Ben's temper, and the introduction of Maggie's overbearing mother Diana Walford (Sarah Chadwick) ahead of Ben and Maggie's vow renewal. The biggest test for the family was an issue-led storyline focusing on Maggie's battle with cancer. Nichol found the emotional scenes easy to play out due to his close friendship with Morassi.

Ben was central to a male depression storyline, which began airing from late 2019, that sought to raise awareness of the disorder and the impact it has on suffers and their loved ones. The storyline was filmed over six months, and Nichol admitted that he was left exhausted by the end of the plot. Ben's depression is triggered by an arrest for drug trafficking, and he is seen continuously rejecting help from Maggie and Ziggy. The character's estranged brother Marco Astoni (Tim Walter) was introduced during 2020, which helped further explore Ben's fictional backstory. Writers used Marco's arrival to test Ben and Maggie's marriage, as it emerges that they once had a one-night stand. The revelation raises questions about Ziggy's paternity and leads to the couple separating. During this time, producers explored a potential romance between Ben and Gemma Parata (Bree Peters). After airing a reconciliation between Ben and Maggie, both characters departed Home and Away on 14 July 2020. The character has been called "one of the town's favourite residents" by a writer for New Idea, but The West Australian' Stephanie McKenna was critical of his persona saying he "displays no emotion" and "rarely expresses an opinion".

== Casting ==
In early June 2017, Luke Dennehy of the Herald Sun confirmed that the four-strong Astoni family, played by Rohan Nichol, Kestie Morassi, Sophie Dillman and Anna Cocquerel, would soon be introduced to the serial. The actors had been photographed filming their first scenes earlier in the year. The Astonis are the first nuclear family to be introduced to Home and Away in 17 years, since the arrival of the Sutherlands in 2000. Nichol was cast as patriarch Ben Astoni. He had previously appeared in the guest role of Stafford McRae in 2004. Nichol admitted that he was "approaching 40 and just feeling very burnt out and not connected to anyone or anything" when he was offered the role. He thought it was good timing and described it as the "right thing" for himself.

He was also glad of the chance to work with Morassi, whom he was friends with. He stated "When I came for the call back, I saw her out the front and I went 'thank god it's Kestie'. We got in there and looked after each other, had a blast, and we both had a good feeling about it." Nichol relocated from Melbourne to Sydney to accommodate his filming commitments. He was keen to stay with the show for a long time, and took inspiration from his co-star Ray Meagher, who has played Alf Stewart since the first episode. He found Meagher's perspective interesting and said "I think he was around my age when he joined, when the show started, and as a man in your 40s you sort of think about 'where am I going in this caper, what am I doing?'" The Astoni's arrival was preceded by a promotional trailer, which showed them visiting the fictional town of Summer Bay. Nichol made his debut as Ben on 20 June 2017.

== Development ==
=== Characterisation ===
Ahead of the character's introduction, a press release stated "Ben is a family man, besotted with his wife and a devoted father to Ziggy and Coco. His business in the city is floundering and his kids are going off the rails. Ben is looking for a circuit breaker." The character's profile on TVNZ describes him as "just your average Aussie bloke." He is "laidback and cheeky", but also has a tough side and is protective of his family, whom he always puts first. Kerry Harvey of Stuff.co.nz said Ben is a "hotheaded" former professional surfer. Nichol branded Ben "a daggy dad" and "hot tempered and emotional", which are traits he shared and could relate to. Nichol liked his character's persona and thought he was the type of man he would spend time with at the weekend. Nichol said "He's a good guy, he's a guy I'd like to have a beer with! I like the fact that Ben is very loyal and he's a lover. He's very in love with his wife." Nichol found the beach scenes were an incentive for him to stay fit, but he thought Ben did not have to "look like a superhero", he just needs to look like a man who stays fit, but also enjoys an occasional beer. Nichol was comfortable portraying Ben's family life and occupation as a carpenter, but he struggled with his character's passion for surfing. He admitted that he could not surf and he felt like he was "chained to a coffee table" every time he left the water with a surfboard.

=== Introduction ===
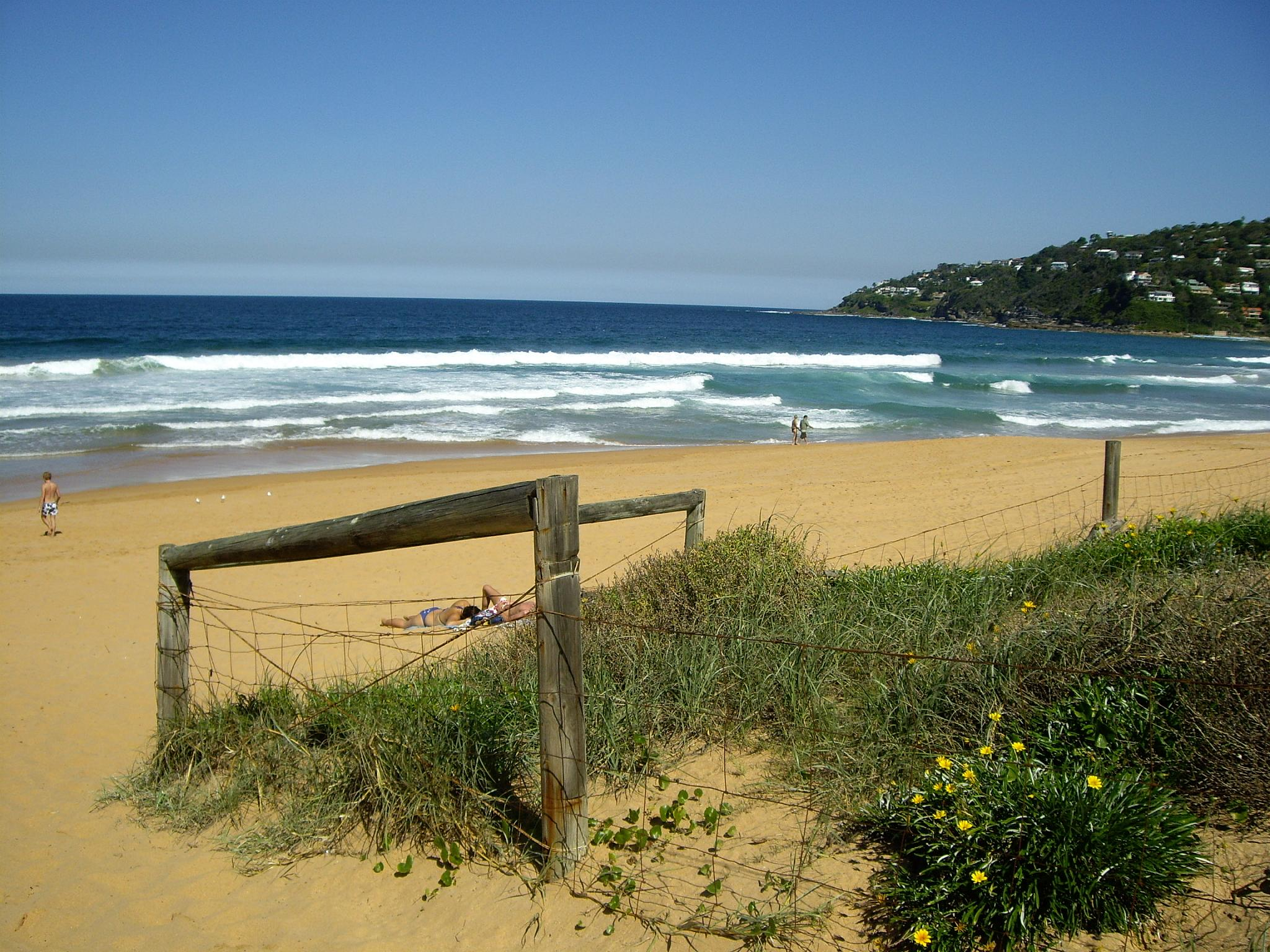
The Astoni family spend the day at the beach in Summer Bay, where surfer Ben is impressed by the "bumper waves", before they decide to move to the town for a fresh start.

Ben and eldest daughter Ziggy Astoni (Dillman) were the first members of the Astoni family to be introduced. Dillman said Ziggy is running away from an issue she has caused in the city when she ducks into a bathroom and meets Brody Morgan (Jackson Heywood). He helps hide her in his car as Ben comes looking for her. Later at home, Ben chastises his daughter for stealing a car and fleeing the scene. At the same time, his wife Maggie Astoni (Morassi) brings their youngest daughter Coco Astoni (Cocquerel) home and reveals that she had been suspended from school, leading Maggie to suggest that they all go on a day trip. Dillman said the Astonis were "a normal family. But they're trying to make things work with two kids." The family end up in Summer Bay, where they spend the day at the beach. When it is time for them to leave, they discover their car will not start, leading Ben to introduce himself to town stalwart Alf Stewart, who realises that their car will not be fixed that day, leaving them stuck in the Bay. The family stay in the caravan park and Ziggy causes trouble by stealing from the locals. Johnathon Hughes of the Radio Times observed that the Astonis are "relieved to be leaving" when the car is fixed, until Ben reverses into a water tank and causes a pipe to burst.

Ben and Maggie decide to move to the Bay permanently, as Maggie secures the principal's job at the local high school and Ben decides on a career change. Vanessa Williams of The West Australian wrote that Ben is "impressed by Summer Bay's golden beaches and bumper waves", and he realises that the town can also offer his family a fresh start. Nichol told Williams that the Astonis like the idea of living in the Bay, as their time in the city has not been working out for them. He continued, "They encounter some friendly faces and it's all a bit fortuitous that they land there and Ben's a surfer, and the waves are good, and between him and his wife, they decide to do what a lot people dream to do and have a bit of a sea change. So that's how it comes to be and naturally there are dramas along the way which everyone will find out about." Nichol identified with the character's move to Summer Bay, due to his own experience of relocating to Manly from Melbourne for the role. Series producer Lucy Addario said the Astonis would settle into the community without any major incidents.

=== Family ===
The introduction of the Astoni family was a return to parent-child storylines that had not been featured in recent years, as many of the show's disjointed families had dominated the plots. Nichol told Williams that to help him and his new co-stars bond, the producers decided against easing them in slowly and gave them a lot of content straight away. They spent long days filming together, which helped them to develop their family dynamics and show their strengths and weaknesses. He thought the process worked well for them. Sarah Ellis of Inside Soap liked how the family pull together in a crisis and noted that they have a good chemistry. Morassi told her that the actors are all friends off-screen and regularly get together for dinner. Addario said the Astonis were fiercely loyal to one another, which helped ground them, and like a lot of families they have "a keenly attuned instinct for riling each other up". Morassi later stated that family had "struck a chord" with fans due to their tightness and portrayal of normal issues that families go through.

Nichol was also hopeful that the Astoni family would be accepted by the show's viewers, citing the humour and lightheartedness in them and their stories. The actor, who does not have children, brought his experience with living with four sisters to the role. He admitted to having a protective streak which helped him understand Ben's family dynamic. He also felt that he was finally the right age to play a father, and compared playing Ben to his role as family man Luc Palermo in headLand where he thought he was "a bit young for it then." Nichol also found the role helped him gain an insight into raising teenagers. He explained 'I've learnt sometimes it's best to listen and let young people talk. Very often I tend to just want to fix something immediately, rather than actually hear somebody. I think it's very important with teenagers that they're heard."

The family are soon tested by Coco's eating disorder. After spending the day not eating, Coco collapses and is hospitalised after suffering a convulsion. She asks Tori Morgan (Penny McNamee) to keep the truth about her condition from her parents, as she thinks that she has it under control. Cocquerel said "Maggie and Ben are deeply suspicious. In addition to being very worried about her, they know she's hiding something." Maggie and Ben do find out about Coco's eating disorder eventually and Cocquerel thought the revelation would have "serious repercussions for the Astoni family." Ben's temper also causes problems for the family when he attacks Brody after a misunderstanding. Ben witnesses Ziggy shouting at Brody to leave her be and instantly thinks "the worst", so he punches Brody in the face. He later learns Brody was helping Ziggy after her drink was spiked.

To help convey Ben and Maggie's strong relationship, writers scripted a vow renewal for the couple. An Inside Soap writer noted that things had not been easy for them during their first few months in the Bay, and Ben's temper had put a strain on his marriage. Their issues are not helped by the introduction of Maggie's overbearing mother Diana Walford (Sarah Chadwick), who makes it clear that she disapproves of Ben and blocks his plans to celebrate his wedding anniversary. He then comes up with the idea of renewing his vows to Maggie, and tries to get Diana "on board". After they reconcile their differences, Diana helps Ben plan the ceremony and leads Maggie down to the beach. Morassi said that Maggie is "very touched" when she sees her family waiting for her, and her mother's presence makes it even more special. Maggie later tells Diana that Ben is the man she wants and he will always be there for her.

In another issue-led storyline for the show, Maggie is diagnosed with cancer and the Astonis are "forced to face up to her mortality". Morassi told Ellis (Inside Soap) that Maggie wants to survive for herself and her family, and she hoped viewers would be able to relate the journey. Maggie's test results indicate that she needs immediate treatment and Ben, Coco and Ziggy attend her first chemotherapy session. She is initially upbeat, but later collapses in Ben's arms and he talks to her about all the things they will do when she is better to reassure her. Maggie is informed that she can undergo a stem cell transplant, so Ben is tested but is not a match. He then convinces his wife to ask Ziggy, even though she is reluctant to put her daughter through the process. Nichol said he tried not to think about what would happen if Maggie died, as she is the love of Ben's life. He found the emotional scenes easy to play out with Morassi, as they are close friends, but he admitted that they were tiring. Diana later arranges for Maggie to join a medical trial in the United States. Nichol commented that Ben is "very apprehensive" as he knows Maggie is not in a fit state to travel. Maggie is later given a stem-cell transplant in Australia and she goes into remission.

=== Depression ===
In late 2019, the character was the focus of a male depression storyline, which sought to raise awareness of the disorder and its impact on sufferers and their loved ones. Nichol was grateful that the scriptwriters and producers entrusted him with the storyline, saying he was "proud" of the plot and how well it had been crafted. He carried out his own research and commented, "I wouldn't be a man of my age and breadth of life without having had a brush with that sort of despair here and there, especially in this profession. Acting is a really hard thing to just survive in, let alone become successful in. I know a few people in my line of life that have had struggles with mental health." Nichol believed his character was "a prime candidate" for depression due to his age. He told Kerry Harvey of Stuff.co.nz that people "ask a lot of questions of [themselves]" when they reach their late 30s and 40s. The cast and crew spent six months filming the storyline, and Nichol admitted that the stamina needed was a challenge and the heavier scenes wore him out. He also found to his surprise that he did not draw on his own life experiences, as Ben's depression felt different from anything he had been through.

"I think allowing yourself to wallow, I suppose, as Ben does, can feel pretty self indulgent but I guess you've got to go there to work it out. And Ben's a more resourceful person and less prone to dwelling on things than perhaps I am. He's a real self-starter and an optimist and that's why for him to be like this is very, very striking and very different, very out of character. I think it will resonate."

— Nichol on how depression affects Ben.

Ben's depression is triggered by his arrest for drug trafficking. After he outsources a large surfboard order, the police find the surfboards have been hollowed out and filled with drugs, leaving Ben as the prime suspect in the investigation. As he is questioned, Ben "protests his innocence" and explains how he outsourced the production to firm in Yabbie Creek, so their employees must be responsible. However, the police find the warehouse empty and no trace of the company, so a "frightened" Ben is kept in the cells at the station overnight. Ben's arrest also affects Dean, with O'Connor commenting that his character is "completely horrified" and worried that he may come under suspicion too. Harvey pointed out that Ben's depression may have been inevitable after he spent months supporting Maggie through her cancer battle and Ziggy with her marriage break-up. The arrest was "the final straw". As Ben spirals further into depression, he is forced to sell his businesses and he also moves into the caravan park. He continuously rejects help from Maggie and Ziggy and does not tell them about his feelings. Maggie and Ziggy struggle to cope and seek counselling for themselves, which Nichol thought was "really important".

Nichol liked that the plot also showed how Ben's depression affects Maggie and Ziggy. He also wanted to be sure that they conveyed Ben and Maggie's commitment to one another, and he praised Morassi's work in particular, saying she "does it justice, absolutely." Ben spends most of his time at the caravan park, where he meets Dean's mother Karen Thompson (Georgia Adamson). Her "flirtatious nature" makes Ben smile for the first time in months and he finds comfort in her kindness. A TV Week writer observed that the pair seem to share a good chemistry, as Ben enjoys Karen's "cheeky attitude". Maggie and Ziggy attempt to raise interest in Ben's surf business, but the response is low until they get Ben to offer free surf lessons. Ben is "slightly buoyed" when Dean pays him, until he learns the lessons were free and arranged by his family, which leaves him feeling embarrassed and he tells them to go to hell. This results in Maggie giving him an ultimatum – get professional help or their marriage is over.

Ben reaches "a devastating climax", after attempting to drive away from the Bay and breaking down in tears at the wheel. He and his family decide to go to the hospital, where he tells Doctor Alex Neilson (Zoe Ventoura) how he has been feeling. After completing a mental health assessment, Ben is diagnosed with severe depression and Alex recommends antidepressants. Ben is initially reluctant to take them as they can produce some bad side effects. Nichol admitted to being exhausted at the end of the storyline, commenting that it was "a real downer" acting out Ben's low moments. He expressed his gratitude and pride at been given a chance to take on "an issue that's so relevant and relatable", adding that the plot was done with "respect and wisdom."

=== Marco Astoni ===
Producers introduced the character's brother Marco Astoni played by Tim Walter in March 2020. Marco's introduction helped to further explore Ben's fictional backstory, as the brothers are estranged. Daniel Kilkelly of Digital Spy reported that Ben assaulted Marco after seeing him argue with Maggie, whom Marco has been in love with since he was a teenager. Marco comes to Summer Bay under the pretence of reconciling with Ben and going into business with him. Ben's "temper flares" when he sees Marco at his birthday party, but Ziggy helps defuse the situation and Ben softens towards his brother. Maggie is seen acting "on edge" around Marco and does not want him around. It soon emerges that Marco and Maggie had a one-night stand during a time when she and Ben were not together. Marco uses this to blackmail Maggie, which leaves her feeling guilty. Morassi commented "Maggie knows that she made a terrible mistake all those years ago, but at the same she and Ben had temporarily broken up. Now she just wants to move on and can't take the pressure anymore. She feels she has no choice but to tell Ben. She needs the truth to come out, even though she knows that it may destroy her marriage."

As Marco requests financial help for a business deal, Maggie soon tells Ben about their one-night stand. The resulting confrontation between the brothers brings up questions about Ziggy's paternity. Dillman pointed out that when Marco arrived, her character did all she could to reunite her uncle and father, as she thought she saw regret in Marco's eyes, but the discovery that she could be Marco's daughter has changed everything. In an interview with the Radio Times' Johnathon Hughes, Dillman said that Ziggy has such a close relationship with Ben that "it kills her that he might not be her father, it's made her feel a bit lost and definitely thrown a spanner in the works." Ziggy knows that Ben will always be her father, so she is initially against doing a paternity test, but the results confirm that she is Ben's biological daughter. Hughes noted that the plot was "one of the biggest challenges yet for the tight-knit clan" and would continue to affect the family. Dillman thought Marco's decision to stay in the Bay made it difficult for the family to move on, and she believed that he might be "desperate for some form of redemption", as he has got Ben in trouble in the past and could be still in love with Maggie.

=== Marriage separation and departure ===
Ben struggles to get past Maggie's revelation and the strain on their marriage leads to their separation. Despite Ziggy's attempt to get them to work things out, the couple start arguing and eventually decide to live apart. In episodes broadcast in mid-May 2020, Ben suffers a health scare and is hospitalised. The scenes see Ben collapse in front of Maggie, before being rushed to the hospital in a critical condition, where he then suffers a seizure. Morassi commented that Maggie is still in love with her husband and wants to move on, but now she might not be able to. While Dillman said that Ziggy wants to make sure her father is okay and she knows he needs Maggie by his side. The scenes revisit the character's depression storyline, as it emerges that Ben took "a dangerous cocktail of drugs" to deal with the stress of his separation. He is advised to talk to his psychiatrist about his problems in the future.

During Ben and Maggie's split, writers explored a potential romance between Ben and the newly introduced character Gemma Parata (Bree Peters). A New Idea columnist observed that Ben appears to feel relieved by his separation from Maggie. Nichol told them: "Ben's marriage was always an absolutely sacred place to him. But now that it's no long that, he has come to feel that he doesn't know Maggie at all. That trust is gone." Ben befriends Bay newcomer Gemma when she invites him to a Hāngī at her home. The columnist noted that they shared "an easy banter". Gemma's teenage son Nikau Parata (Kawakawa Fox-Reo) also notices their connection and takes an instant dislike to Ben. Ben flirts with Gemma as they grow closer, which devastates Maggie when she sees them together. Morassi commented "The thought of Ben being with another woman is her worst nightmare." Following a confrontation between the pair, Ben gets drunk with Gemma and they go back to his motel room.

Ben and Maggie eventually reconcile and decide to make a fresh start in Italy. Morassi commented "Moving to Italy with Ben has always been one of Maggie's dreams". She also said that the separation means the couple are "very different people now", so they feel that they are starting their relationship over, which leaves them both excited and nervous. Ben and Maggie ask their daughters to come with them, but they choose to stay in Australia. The plot development marked the departures of both Ben and Maggie from the show. Their final scenes saw them spending their last night in the Bay reflecting on their time there, before attending a surprise goodbye lunch hosted by Alf and their friends. The couple's exit causes Ziggy to become depressed, and Dillman commented "They've always been in it together and they've been through so much. She's lost. Where do you go from here?" Following the broadcast of his character's exit scenes on 14 July 2020, Rohan took to his social media to thank the producers, cast, crew, and fans. He added that they had "made a few dreams come true for me."

== Reception ==
A TV Week reporter observed that the Astoni family "have not had a smooth sea change" when Ben and Maggie bought the Pier and Diner. The magazine's Tamara Cullen said Ben and Maggie had "a tough 2019", which left their marriage "hanging by a thread". Ali Cromarty of New Idea pointed out the character was popular with the show's fans, saying that they "love Ben", and Nichol told her that people who visit the outdoor set "are always so happy to see me". Another writer for New Idea described Ben as "one of the town's favourite residents" and a "much-loved dad". While another writer for the publication stated that Ben and Maggie "were once one of Summer Bay's happiest married couples." Many viewers related to the character's depression storyline, with some reaching out to Nichol to talk about their struggles. He said that "it's meant a lot to me. Being courageous enough [to open up] is lovely."

Stephanie McKenna of The West Australian branded the character a "future Darwin award winner" after he admitted to changing his dose of anti-depressants before his collapse. McKenna called the short romance between Ben and Gemma "a bit disappointing" because of the limited relationship options in Summer Bay, and she quipped "the producers love getting our hopes up and then crushing them." McKenna was also critical of the character's persona when confronted, noting that "in typical Ben fashion he displays no emotion nor an ounce of personality", and adding that he also "rarely expresses an opinion". When Ben stopped Maggie from leaving town, McKenna wondered how much time he needed to make a decision about their marriage, commenting "Get over it and go back to her or move on."
