= Mountaineer (disambiguation) =

A mountaineer is a mountain climber.

Mountaineer may also refer to:

== University athletic teams and mascots ==
- Appalachian State Mountaineers, the athletic teams of Appalachian State University
- Eastern Oregon Mountaineers, the athletic teams of Eastern Oregon University
- Mansfield Mountaineers, the athletic teams of Mansfield University of Pennsylvania
- Mohawk Mountaineers, the athletic teams of Mohawk College
- West Virginia Mountaineers, the athletic teams of West Virginia University
  - West Virginia Mountaineer, mascot for the university
- Western Colorado Mountaineers, the athletic teams of Western Colorado University

== Transportation ==
- Mercury Mountaineer, a midsize sport utility vehicle (SUV) manufactured under the Mercury brand
- Rocky Mountaineer, a Canadian rail-tour company
- Mountaineer (Amtrak train), a passenger train operated by Amtrak in the 1970s
- Mountaineer (B&M train), a passenger train operated by the Boston and Maine Railroad in the 1940s and 1950s
- Mountaineer, a train operated by the Minneapolis, St. Paul and Sault Ste. Marie Railroad

== Other ==
- Mountaineers cricket team, a Zimbabwean first class cricket team
- Mountaineers women's cricket team, a Zimbabwean women's cricket team
- Mountaineer Power Plant, a major coal-fired electricity-generating station in New Haven, West Virginia, USA
- The Mountaineers, an outdoor recreation club based in Seattle, WA
- The Mountaineer, a newspaper based in Waynesville, North Carolina
- The Mountaineer, an Australian newspaper in Katoomba, New South Wales (1894—1908)
- Bearded mountaineer, Oreonympha nobilis, a species of hummingbird
- Ski mountaineering, an Olympic sport introduced in 2026
- Mountaineer, the Secret Service code name for Donald Trump Jr.
