= Rohan Nichol =

Australian actor

- Born: 4 July 1976 (age 50); Geraldton, Western Australia, Australia
- Occupation: Actor
- Years active: 2000–present
- Spouse: Peta Sergeant - m.2008 divorced Cheree Cassidy m. 2025

Rohan Nichol (born 4 July 1976) is an Australian television and film actor. His roles include Raymus Antilles in Star Wars: Episode III – Revenge of the Sith, Aaron Collingwood in All Saints, and Detective Luc Palermo in headLand. From June 2017, he began playing Ben Astoni in the television soap opera Home and Away.

== Early life ==
Nichol was born and raised in Geraldton. He attended the Western Australian Academy of Performing Arts (WAAPA).

== Career ==
Nichol played Captain Raymus Antilles in Star Wars: Episode III – Revenge of the Sith (2005). He initially thought he would be portraying Wedge Antilles, but when he arrived on the set in Sydney, he learned that he would actually play the part of Raymus, originally played by Peter Geddis in Star Wars Episode IV: A New Hope.

Nichol has also appeared in Fool's Gold, alongside Kate Hudson and Matthew McConaughey, and the 2011 film Red Dog, alongside his Revenge of the Sith co-star Keisha Castle-Hughes. Nichol played Detective Luc Palermo in headLand, and appeared in several episodes of the TV series All Saints as Aaron Collingwood. Other television appearances include, A Place to Call Home and Reef Doctors.

Nichol joined the main cast of Home and Away as Ben Astoni in 2017. He had previously appeared in the serial in 2004 as Stafford McRae. Nichol relocated from Melbourne to Manly in New South Wales to be closer to the studio. Nichol also made an appearance in Pirates of the Caribbean: Dead Men Tell No Tales that same year. In July 2020, Nichol and co-star Kestie Morassi, who played Maggie Astoni, departed Home and Away. Nichol plays Griffo in the ABC Me drama series MaveriX, which began airing in April 2022.

== Personal life ==
Nichol began dating actress Peta Sergeant in 2002, after meeting while acting in a play at the Sydney Fringe Festival. In 2007, the pair relocated to LA for work for a period of time, before ultimately returning to Australia.

== Filmography ==
=== Film ===
Year	Title	Role	Notes
2002	Garage Days	York Pub Manager	
2004	A Man's Gotta Do	Paul	
2005	Netaji Subhas Chandra Bose: The Forgotten Hero	CID Officer	
2005	Star Wars: Episode III – Revenge of the Sith	Captain Raymus Antilles	
2007	Katoomba	Gavin	Short
2008	Fool's Gold	Stefan	
2009	Creating Fortune	Ray Fortune	Short
2010	Veneer	Tom	Short
2010	Mercury	Matt	Short
2010	South Solitary	Harry Stanley	
2011	Red Dog	Jocko	
2017	Pirates of the Caribbean: Dead Men Tell No Tales	Officer Cole	
2023	The Appleton Ladies' Potato Race	Mark Bunyan	

=== Television ===
Year	Title	Role	Notes
2000	Water Rats	Shane Green	Season 5, Episode 22: "Reunion"
2002	White Collar Blue	Lester Zwick	Season 1, Episode 13
2002–2003	All Saints	Aaron Collingwood	
2004	Home and Away	Stafford McRae	Recurring role
2005–2006	headLand	Detective Luc Palermo	
2008	Underbelly	Brendan Kraus	
2009	Rush	Napthorn	
2010	The Pacific	2nd Lt. Lebec	Miniseries (Episode 4: ""Gloucester/Pavuvu/Banika")
2011	Killing Time	Detective Scarlett	Season 1, Episode 10
2011	Terra Nova	Weaver	
2012	Miss Fisher's Murder Mysteries	Vic Freeman	Season 1, Episode 3: "The Green Mill Murder"
2013	Reef Doctors	Toby McGrath	
2014	Perception	Mick Dorian	Season 3, Episode 3: "Shiver"
2014	The Exes	Professor Straf	Season 4, Episode 7: "Catch It 'Cause You Can"
2016	Comedy Showroom: The Future is Expensive	Elliot	TV short
2016	Upper Middle Bogan	Matt	Season 3, Episode 3: "If You Knew Susie"
2016	A Place to Call Home	Sergeant Brian Taylor	
2017	Sexy Herpes	Dr Phillip Roth	Webseries
2017–2020	Home and Away	Ben Astoni	Main cast
2022	MaveriX	Griffo	
2026	My Brilliant Career	Mr. McSwat	3 episodes
