= The Mountaineer (Katoomba) =

The Mountaineer was a newspaper published in Katoomba, New South Wales which circulated throughout the Blue Mountains and Hartley districts between 1894 and 1908.

== History ==
In September 1894 Robert Moss, said by Bennett to have been the proprietor of the earlier Advertiser, began publishing The Mountaineer in Main Street Katoomba (near the Family Hotel). The paper circulated “throughout the Blue Mountain and Hartley Districts”. At the end of 1894 Moss sold the paper to Peter Giles Hart who remained its publisher until May 1904 when he passed it on to his brother-in-law John Knight. During Hart’s time as proprietor the business moved its premises from Main Street to Park Street. At the end of 1908 The Mountaineer was sold by Knight to a new public company, “The Mountaineer Printing and Publishing Company, Ltd.”, whose board of directors was made up of a number of well-known local businessmen. This company planned to publish a new paper “much enlarged of an entirely different character, and in keeping with the needs and requirements of the rapidly rising places on the Mountains”.

== Digitisation ==
The Mountaineer has been digitised as part of the Australian Newspapers Digitisation Program project of the National Library of Australia.

== See also ==
- List of newspapers in New South Wales
- List of newspapers in Australia
