= Kestie Morassi =

Australian actress

- Born: 9 August 1978 (age 48); Adelaide, South Australia, Australia
- Education: National Theatre, Melbourne
- Occupation: Actress
- Years active: 1995–present

Kestie Morassi (born 9 August 1978) is an Australian film and television actress. She played Natalie in the TV series Satisfaction (2007–2010) and Maggie Astoni in Home and Away (2017–2020). Morassi has also appeared in the films Dirty Deeds (2002), Wolf Creek (2005) and The Illustrated Family Doctor (2005), and has made television appearances on Underbelly (2008), Wilfred (2010) and Black Snow (2022).

== Early life ==
Morassi was born in Adelaide, South Australia. She lived in Adelaide until she was thirteen years old. She studied at the National Theatre, Melbourne Drama School, graduating in 1994, and another five years at Drama with a Difference where she later became a full-time teacher for the school.

== Career ==
Morassi first appeared on the television series Neighbours in 1996. She would later appear in BeastMaster, Stingers and The Secret Life of Us in the early 2000s before making the transition to films in 2002 alongside an all-star cast including Bryan Brown, Toni Collette, Sam Neill, Sam Worthington and John Goodman in Dirty Deeds which saw her nominated for a Best Supporting Actor award by the Film Critics Circle of Australia.

Morassi has also appeared in Darkness Falls, Travelling Light, Strange Bedfellows, Thunderstruck, The Illustrated Family Doctor and Josh Jarman before getting her international break in the Australian box-office success Wolf Creek, which screened at the 2005 Sundance Film Festival. She played backpacker Kristy Earl, for which she was nominated for an Australian Film Institute award for Best Supporting Actress in 2005. She also starred in the Patrick Hughes short film Signs for Schweppes opposite Nick Russell.

In recent work, Morassi played whip-cracking brothel manager Natalie in Foxtel's groundbreaking drama Satisfaction and portrays sultry and infatuated criminal defence lawyer Zarah Garde-Wilson in the Nine Network TV drama series Underbelly. In 2010, she had a guest appearance on Wilfred, playing "Kat".

Morassi joined the cast of Seven Network soap opera Home and Away in 2017 as Maggie Astoni. She departed in July 2020, along with Rohan Nichol who plays her on-screen husband Ben Astoni.

In 2020 Morassi returned to the big screen in paranormal horror Surrogate alongside Jane Badler. Morassi plays Natalie Paxton, a nurse and single mother, who falls mysteriously ill and struggles to save her family from being destroyed. Surrogate premiered April 6, 2022 at Sun Theatre, Yarraville, Victoria for a limited four-week theatrical run where it was number 1, two weeks running. Surrogate was released internationally in September 2022 on TubiTV and Amazon Prime.

== Filmography ==
=== Film ===
Kestie Morassi film credits
Year	Title	Role	Notes
2002	Dirty Deeds	Margaret	Nominated – FCCA Award for Best Supporting Actor (Female)
2002	The Merchant of Fairness	Katrina	
2002	Travelling Light	Rhonda	
2003	Darkness Falls	Nurse Lauren	
2003	Strange Bedfellows	Carla	
2003	Thunderstruck	Amy	
2004	Josh Jarman	Sasha	
2005	Wolf Creek	Kristy Earl	Nominated – AFI Award for Best Supporting Actress
2005	The Illustrated Family Doctor	Jennifer	
2008	Signs	Stacey	Short film
2009	Piñata	Wendy	Short film
2009	Birthday	Lily	Melbourne Underground Film Festival Award for Best Supporting Actress
2010	The Wedding Party	Jacqui	
2010	Blame	Cate	
2012	Fearless	Rachel Lepinsky	Short film
2012	Real Meal Deal	Activist	Short film
2014	Fractions	Peta	Short film
2020	Surrogate	Natalie Paxton	

=== Television ===
Kestie Morassi television credits
Year	Title	Role	Notes
1996	Neighbours	Charnelle Edwards	1 episode
2001	The Saddle Club	Mrs. Sharlow	1 episode
2001	Beastmaster	Erial	Episode: "The Legend Reborn"
2002	The Secret Life of Us	Larissa	2 episodes
2003	Stingers	Simone	1 episode
2006	Two Twisted	Rose	1 episode
2007–2010	Satisfaction	Natalie	Main role
2008	Underbelly	Zarah Garde-Wilson	TV miniseries
2010	Wilfred	Kat	1 episode
2010	Offspring	Ivy	3 episodes
2017–20	Home and Away	Maggie Astoni	Main role (Seasons 30–33)
2023	Almost Paradise	Janice	1 episode
