= Ari Parata =

- Home and Away character
- Portrayed by: Rob Kipa-Williams
- Duration: 2019–2022
- First appearance: 27 November 2019
- Last appearance: 15 March 2022
- Introduced by: Lucy Addario
In-universe information
- Other names: Ariki Wiremu Parata
- Occupation: Labourer; Gym co-owner
- Father: Rawiri Parata
- Mother: Tui Parata
- Brothers: Mikaere Parata; Tane Parata
- Wife: Mia Anderson (2022)
- Sons: Kauri
- Stepdaughters: Chloe Anderson
- Nephews: Nikau Parata

Ari Parata is a fictional character from the Australian television soap opera Home and Away, played by Rob Kipa-Williams. The actor had given up acting and was training for a new career as an insurance adviser when he was given the character brief for Ari. He was initially unsure about returning to acting, but he felt like the character was a good fit for him and he auditioned for the role. After winning the part, Kipa-Williams realised that he would have to relocate to Sydney for filming. He had doubts about the move, but later admitted that he was happy he went through with it, as Home and Away helped him regain his love of acting. Kipa-Williams signed a three-year contract and he began filming around May 2019. He made his first appearance during the serial's season finale on 27 November 2019.

Ari was introduced along with his brother Tane Parata (Ethan Browne), their nephew Nikau Parata (Kawakawa Fox-Reo), and sister-in-law Gemma Parata (Bree Peters). They were the serial's first Māori and indigenous family to join the main cast of Home and Away. The actors wanted to include as much of the Māori culture in the show as possible and worked with the producers and scriptwriters to achieve a high level of authenticity. Ari is portrayed as being very protective of his family, but he dislikes confrontation and struggles to express his emotions. Kipa-Williams believed he was "a little bit lost", which he could relate to. It quickly emerges that Ari has spent time in prison and he is frequently frustrated about the limited opportunities available to him because of his record. Ari is first seen among a number of hostages during a siege at the local hospital, which formed the show's season finale. Kipa-Williams likened the filming of the storyline to a feature film. Ari seeks a quieter life and his family soon move to Summer Bay, where initial scenes between them show that Nikau blames Ari for something that happened in their past, while Ari thinks Tane is a bad influence on Nikau.

The Paratas feud with Constable Colby Thorne (Tim Franklin), who has their passports blocked when they plan a trip to New Zealand to scatter the ashes of their brother, father and husband, Mikaere. The Parata men honour Mikaere by performing a Haka on the beach. The scenes were a first for Home and Away and involved multiple takes. Kipa-Williams dedicated his performance to a family member and admitted to feeling the weight of responsibility with the storyline. Ari soon establishes a relationship with restaurateur Mackenzie Booth (Emily Weir). A love triangle develops when Mac finds herself attracted to Tane, but she realises that she has serious feelings for Ari, who soon commits to her. Weir believed Ari was the best match for her character, as Tane would likely bring chaos to her life. The relationship ends shortly after the introductions of Ari's stepdaughter Chloe Anderson (Sam Barrett) and her mother Mia Anderson (Anna Samson). Kipa-Williams admitted he was disappointed with Mac and Ari's break-up, as he wanted the characters to become a solid, long term couple.

With the arrival of Mia and Chloe, producers took the opportunity to explore Ari's fictional backstory further, which Kipa-Williams relished. He thought Ari and Mia were "star-crossed lovers" and believed that Ari had never stopped loving her. The pair soon reconcile, but their relationship is tested by his involvement with a criminal gang and a targeted hit-and-run, which leaves him with serious injuries. Writers scripted a pregnancy for the couple, however, Mia is involved in a car accident during the 2021 mid-season finale, and she has a miscarriage. At the end of the year, Chloe's biological father Matthew Montgomery (James Sweeny) was introduced and Ari takes the blame for his death when Chloe accidentally kills him while protecting Mia.

Kipa-Williams quit Home and Away and producers decided to kill-off his character. Ari is admitted to hospital with cancer of the appendix and he opts not to have surgery to remove the tumours, as he wants to die on his terms. Ari and Mia marry shortly before he dies. He made his final appearance on 15 March 2022. Kipa-Williams received a nomination for Best Daytime Star at the Inside Soap Awards in 2020. Ari and the Parata family received a positive response from critics and viewers, with some branding them New Zealand's answer to the River Boys, a popular group of characters introduced in 2011. The character's break-up with Mac was not well received, with Digital Spy's Susannah Alexander and Daniel Kilkelly saying the show had "lost a solid couple". Ari's death was branded "heart wrenching" and shocking, and left some viewers questioning why Home and Away killed-off one of its most popular characters.

== Casting ==
Kipa-Williams was cast as Ari having given up acting in the wake of the cancellation of 800 Words, in which he played a recurring role. He had also suffered disappointment at missing out on several roles, which often occurred when he reached the final two at the casting stage. Kipa-Williams wanted "some stability", so he began considering things like family, buying a house, and training for a new career as an insurance adviser. When he was given the character brief for Ari, he was unsure about returning to acting, but he felt like the character was "a really strong fit" for him and he attended the audition. After being offered the role, he realised that it meant he would have to relocate from New Zealand to Sydney. He admitted that he was happy he went through with the move, as the show helped him regain his love of acting. Kipa-Williams signed a three-year contract, and he began filming around six months before his debut in the 2019 season finale. His appearance confirmed speculation that a new family was joining the cast of Home and Away, following the departures of three members of the Morgan family.

== Development ==
=== Characterisation and family ===
After his first scenes aired, Kipa-Williams wrote a detailed biography from his character's perspective on social media. He revealed that Ari's full name is Ariki Wiremu Parata, and that he moved to Australia from New Zealand twelve years prior to his debut appearance. He continued: "I've had a few challenges and those challenges brought me to Summer Bay... I love my whanau (family), I'll do anything for them, but never cross me. I didn't know the guy who died but my heart goes out to the family. As for me, I guess you'll find out if I stay in the bay or if I go when Home and Away returns in 2020." The character's profile on TVNZ confirmed that Ari had served time in prison, which he tries to keep to himself. Kipa-Williams revealed that Ari was involved in "a life of crime", but made the decision to change and leave it behind him. However, "he wrestles with his past" and is constantly "frustrated" with the few opportunities available to him because of his criminal record. Ari is "fiercely protective" of the family, especially since his brother's death, and he has become the patriarch of the family. Although this has left him feeling "a little out of his depth". Ari dislikes confrontation and he struggles to express his emotions, but he is keen to change "his path." Kipa-Williams stated "he has made some strong choices but he is a little bit lost. I think that's nice because I've been lost, and I think a lot of people are lost."

Ari's brother Tane Parata (Ethan Browne), their nephew Nikau Parata (Kawakawa Fox-Reo), and sister-in-law Gemma Parata (Bree Peters) were introduced in early 2020. The Paratas were the serial's first Māori family and first indigenous family to join the main cast. The actors are all New Zealand born with a Māori background. Browne revealed that the actors all auditioned together, with Kipa-Williams, Peters and Fox-Reo starting the following week, while he started a couple of months after. They established a close bond, with Kipa-Williams explaining "What's special for me is whānau, which is the Maori word for family. The cool thing about being on the show is that all of us, we didn't know each other – and I think our cultural bond bonded us to help bring what you see on screen. That gave us a sense of togetherness that came quite easily for us." Kipa-Williams said the viewers would hear different accents, humour and cultural behaviour from the family, which he thought was "nice", as every new family brings "a new vibe" to the show, but the Paratas would also bring a new culture too. Kipa-Williams, Browne and Fox-Reo wanted to include as much of the Māori culture in the show as possible, but they were unsure how much they could include. Kipa-Williams said that they started off introducing various Māori words in their dialogue, before working with the producers and scriptwriters to achieve more authenticity. Kipa-Williams added that it meant a lot to them and believed viewers back home would be able to connect with their characters.

Kipa-Williams said Ari moves to Summer Bay as he wants a quieter life. He explained "Ari is going through quite a change – he's decided he doesn't want to be part of his old life any more. He's made a strong decision to be another way, and he's guiding his sister-in-law and nephew away from their old lives, too. He feels a huge weight of responsibility to provide for his family." Discussing the family's fictional backstory, Kipa-Williams revealed that the Paratas were run out of their old town and they worry that it could happen again. He also said that Ari has become used to seeing violence, such as that used in the hospital siege, so it does not bother him as much. After his involvement in the hospital siege, Ari quickly leaves the scene when he notices the press have turned up. He is also keen to find his nephew Nikau. Rachel Lucas of What's on TV observed that there seemed to be some "bad blood" between the pair, and Kipa-Williams told her that Nikau blames Ari for a situation that occurred in their past. He also told Lucas: "You don't really find out about the family's secret straight away. You start to see the complexities, how close they are and that they do love each other, but that it's messed up with past trauma." Ari, Nikau and Gemma are soon reunited, but his brother Tane does not immediately join the family. It becomes clear that Tane is an "outcast", as he earns his money through illegitimate means, which Ari disapproves of. However, Nikau asks Tane to come to the Bay to take care of him. Ari believes Tane is a bad influence on Nikau, and when asked if he felt the same way, Browne stated: "I can understand why he thinks that. Ari knows that Tane does dodgy things to make a living, because that's what Ari used to do. So I guess Ari is worried that Nikau's going to follow in Tane's footsteps, in the same way that Tane followed in his..."

=== Introduction and early storylines ===
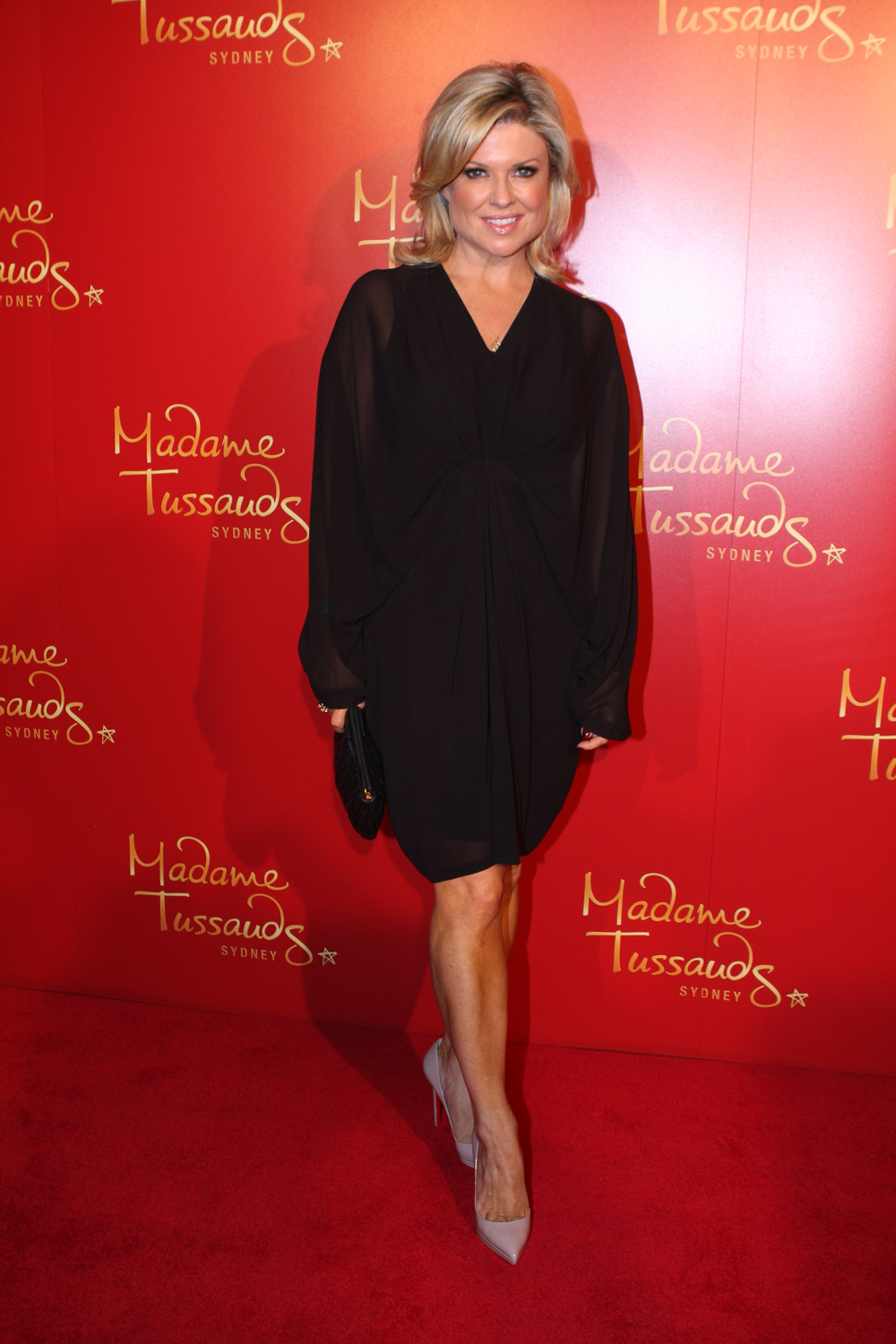
Ari befriends Marilyn Chambers, played by Emily Symons (pictured), during a siege at the hospital.

The character was introduced during the serial's 2019 season finale, which saw several characters held hostage at gunpoint in the local hospital. Kipa-Williams explained that Ari's boss sends him to the hospital after he sustains a cut to his arm while working on a construction site. Shortly after Ari arrives, armed men from the Ouroboros gang take everyone on that floor hostage. When the hostages are rounded up, Ari is forced to sit next to "a terrified" Marilyn Chambers (Emily Symons), who he instantly tries to help and reassure. Kipa-Williams told Rachel Lucas of What's on TV: "Ari comes from a past where he's not unfamiliar with bad guys. He's relatively calm, he's very aware and he's strategizing a way to get the hostages – or himself – out." Knowing that they need to gain "control of the situation", Ari teams up with Mason Morgan (Orpheus Pledger) and they devise an escape plan. Ari leads most of the hostages out of the building, while Mason tries to distract the gunmen, which results in his death when he is shot. Kipa-Williams likened the filming of the storyline to a feature film, saying "We spent quite a number of days in the hospital set and at the exterior of the hospital so my first few days filming were quite intense. It was a really nice welcome!" The actor was also grateful that he shared his first scenes with Symons. After the scenes aired, it was confirmed that Ari's family would soon be introduced and that they would be hiding some secrets.

The Paratas later move in with Marilyn and her husband John Palmer (Shane Withington). Kipa-Williams explained that Marilyn "stumbles" across the family living out of their car on her way to work, and invites them to stay with her, but they initially turn her offer down. Gemma's pride stops her from accepting Marilyn's offer, until she realises that the family needs to come first. When John returns home, he is surprised to find the family in his house. Kipa-Williams believed John was jealous of Ari's connection with Marilyn, saying "John doesn't like the fact that Marilyn has this bond with Ari. He wishes she shared that connection with him, and John starts to grow jealous – it gets heated a few times." Symons explained that for Marilyn, letting the family stay with her is her way of paying back Ari for comforting her during the siege. She sees that the family is struggling and wants to help them settle in the Bay. John's opposition causes problems in his marriage, as he does not understand why Marilyn would invite the family to stay. Symons was excited about the Parata's introduction, as it gave everyone "a new energy to play off." The fractious nature of Ari and Tane's relationship comes to a head when they fight over their nephew. After Nikau gets fed up living with Ari and Gemma, he seeks out his uncle and stays the night at his place. When Tane drops him off in the morning, Ari accuses Tane of being "a bad influence" and the pair have a physical altercation by the road.

Following a break-in at the Pier Diner, Constable Colby Thorne (Tim Franklin) is convinced the Paratas had something to do with it and he becomes "desperate" to pin the crime on them. Kipa-Williams commented "Ari initially believes Tane robbed the Diner. But he also believes Colby is acting out of jealousy more than anything else." Ari and Tane realise they need to put some distance between themselves and the Bay when Nikau discovers Colby is planning on conducting a police line-up involving them all. Nikau later steals Tori's car in order to flee the Bay, but he accidentally kidnaps her young daughter Grace. Tane helps him return Grace to Tori anonymously, but Colby realises that the Paratas were involved in the car-jacking. Sarah Ellis of Inside Soap observed that with "the heat on their family", the brothers know they need to act fast. When they learn Gemma is planning a trip to New Zealand to scatter the ashes of her husband, they seize the chance to escape. A show spokesperson told Ellis: "It's not just about evading the law, Ari and Tane both want to pay their respects to their late brother Mikaere. So the family presses ahead with their plans, hoping that getting to New Zealand will give them time to consider their options. But things don't turn out how they'd planned..." When Colby hears the Paratas are leaving the country, he puts a block on their passports, so only Gemma is able to pass through security at the airport, while the men are detained. The storyline marked Gemma's departure from the serial.

Despite a possible jail sentence hanging over them, the Parata men are keen to honour their late brother and father, so they go to the beach and perform a "deeply spiritual and moving" Haka ceremony to say their goodbyes to Mikaere. Kipa-Williams told Tamara Cullen of TV Week that the scenes were "tough" to film and involved multiple takes. He called the ceremony "an act of love and honour in a way only Māori can express themselves." The ceremony scenes were a first for Home and Away. Maori advisors Kani Collier and Tainui Stephens helped with the writing for the storyline. Kipa-Williams was emotional filming the Haka, and he dedicated his performance to a family member whose funeral he was unable to attend due to travel restrictions caused by COVID-19. In an interview with Alicia Vrajlal of HuffPost, Kipa-Williams explained that everyone acknowledged the Aboriginal people of the land before filming the scenes. He also told Vrajlal that he felt the "weight of responsibility" with the storyline, adding "Will it be received well not just by my own people but the international audience? This really is an Australian first and it feels at times a little daunting. I think what's great about this Haka and hopefully where the storyline takes us is the Haka speaks of moving from dark to light, from wrong to right and I guess this is where I'd love to see our character arc go." Without Gemma, "tempers flare" between the Parata men because of financial worries and Tane considers returning to his "criminal ways" to help the family. Ari tries to talk him out of it, but when he returns home to tell Tane that he has secured some work, he finds his brother has left town.

=== Relationship with Mackenzie Booth ===
The character was paired with Mackenzie Booth (Emily Weir) for a romance story arc in April 2020. The pair begin interacting on a regular basis when Ari uses Mac's restaurant Salt as a base to search the newspapers for employment. Ari finds support in Mac as he struggles to find a job, and his closed off nature intrigues her. Weir said that Ari is attractive to Mac because he is "drama-free" compared to her previous partner Colby Thorne. She also said "Ari seems someone who's calm and relaxed with himself." Mac is unaware that Ari served time with her brother Dean Thompson (Patrick O'Connor), so when she mentions that they have been spending time together, he warns Ari to stay away from her. However, Mac notices Ari's absence and goes to his caravan to confront him. Her "blunt approach" amuses Ari and it leads him to tell her about his past, including his stint in prison. Weir pointed out that Mac is unlikely to judge him for having "a complicated past" since she also has one. Mac makes it clear that she is still interested in Ari and the pair spend the night together. As Mackenzie leaves Ari's van in the morning, she greets John, who immediately visits Marilyn to gossip about what has gone on. An Inside Soap columnist wondered if Ari's "night of passion" had just cost his family a place to live. Ari later has "serious beef" with Tane over Mac.

A love triangle was introduced into the storyline when Mac develops a strong attraction to Tane. When Inside Soap's Sarah Ellis asked Weir why Mac is so attracted to Tane when Ari is "the sensible brother, who would undoubtedly give Mackenzie a secure future and everything she needs", Weir replied that it was a case of what her character is normally attracted to versus what she actually needs. When a jealous Mac fights with Tane's love interest Amber Simmons (Maddy Jevic), she knows that it will likely get back to Ari, so she tells him how she feels about his brother. Weir described her character as "very moral" and stressed that she would never cheat on Ari, but when he started to pick up on the tension between her and Tane, she knows that she cannot lie to him. Weir also said that the whole incident makes Mac realise that she does have serious feelings for Ari. Mac eventually tells Ari that she wants more than a casual relationship and if he cannot give her more commitment, then she will walk away. Ari realises that he has not given his relationship with Mac a fair chance, so he takes her out on a fishing date. Ari opens up to Mac and tells her that he has "lost his way" when it comes to romance since his time in prison, but he hopes the date will teach her more about him. Kipa-Williams said "It was a life that landed him in prison for something he regrets dearly. He doesn't want to make any mistakes again." Mac admits to Ari that she used to go fishing as a child, making their trip "the perfect date" and the pair start afresh as a proper couple.

In an interview with Daniel Kilkelly of Digital Spy, Weir believed Ari was "the best match" for Mac. She explained "For Ari, the attraction for Mac would be that he provides her with groundings. His energy allows her to feel safe and protected and I guess relaxed, because she can be quite a buzz in the brain, quite a stress head and that's something that really attracts her to his energy." Weir thought Ari was more likely to prioritise her, while Tane would bring too much drama and chaos into her life. Weir also told Kilkelly that as things between Ari and Mac become more serious, Mac finds that Tane is not "a temptation" and she can fully commit to Ari and their future. In scenes filmed in the Blue Mountains, Mac joins the brothers as they search for Nikau and his girlfriend Bella Nixon (Courtney Miller), who needs to return for a police interview. Weir said that Mac is pleased when Ari and Tane temporarily set aside their differences to find Nikau and Bella. While Mac is staying with the Paratas, Ari soon notices the tension between her and Tane. After Tane admits that he is struggling to be himself around Mac, she decides to move in with Ziggy Astoni (Sophie Dillman), just as Ari asks her to move in permanently. As Mac thinks the offer over, Ari runs out of patience and he questions whether she is as committed to their relationship as he is. Mac moves out and Ari takes his anger out on Tane, before his suspicions lead him to give Mac an ultimatum about the status of their relationship.

The arrival of Ari's stepdaughter Chloe Anderson (Sam Barrett) and her mother Mia Anderson (Anna Samson) in February 2021 leads to the end of his relationship with Mac. Ari and Mac struggle to find time to be together with Mia and Chloe in the Bay. Mac tries to be supportive, but it becomes clear that there are unresolved issues between Ari and Mia. Kipa-Williams told Sarah Ellis of Inside Soap that Ari had no romantic intentions towards Mia, as he is happy with Mac, but then a sense of familiarity creeps in and being with Mia is "second nature" to Ari. Ari later invites Mia to a barbeque at the Parata house, but forgets to tell Mac, who learns about the event from Mia. Mac later sees Ari and Mia sharing a private moment together in the yard. Kipa-Williams said that Mia's presence has stirred up memories of the past that his character thought he had buried. While Samson commented that Mia does not want to get in the way of Ari's relationship and she has "no bad feelings" towards Mac. Ari later ends the relationship because of his unresolved feelings for Mia. Kipa-Williams told TV Week's Stephen Downie "After spending time in prison, Ari has decided to live by a new set of rules and tries to be as honest as possible. He loves Mia and Mac, which is why he needs to break up with Mac and figure out his feelings for Mia and what her being here means to him."

In an interview with Susannah Alexander and Daniel Kilkelly of Digital Spy, Kipa-Williams expressed his disappointment about Mac and Ari's break up. He admitted that he was "really sad about it", as he enjoyed the bond he had formed with Weir and wanted their characters to become "a solid couple" similar to Ben Astoni (Rohan Nichol) and Maggie Astoni (Kestie Morassi). Kipa-Williams thought it would be good to have a character that was not "a player" and instead he was shown wanting a committed relationship. Kipa-Williams gave viewers hope of a reconciliation for Ari and Mac, saying "I think there's always a chance for rekindling relationships. Mack has become quite hurt from it all though." Kipa-Williams said events surrounding the break-up would be "heartbreaking". He predicted tears would be shed and was interested in the audience reaction, adding "something happens that almost rips everyone apart..." Writers scripted a pregnancy for Mac, which she keeps secret from Ari as she decides whether or not to have an abortion. The decision is taken out of her hand when she suffers an ectopic pregnancy and miscarries. Mac returns to work at Salt, but when Ari turns up with Mia and attempts to talk to her, Mac cannot face being in the same room as him. Weir said it was "too painful" for Mac, who is "rattled" by his presence. Weir also said that Mac is feeling confused and abandoned by Ari. Shortly after, Mac collapses and Tane takes her to the hospital, where Ari, who has learned the truth about the pregnancy, comforts her as she cries in his arms.

=== Relationship with Mia Anderson ===
"It's helped us to explore why and how Ari ended up in prison, and I think that's interesting to play as an actor when you're steeped with so much back story and history between two characters. It enables you to really create something special."

— Kipa-Williams on how Mia's introduction helped with the exploration of his character's backstory.

The introductions of Mia and Chloe helped further exploration of Ari's fictional backstory. It emerges that after their baby son died, Ari's grief caused him to self-destruct and he was later sent to prison for 10 years. Mia then chose to move away with Chloe, who lost the only father figure she had ever known. Ari is surprised when Chloe turns up in the Bay to see him, and he soon learns that Mia lied to Chloe about why he left them, saying that he did not want to be in their lives anymore. Kipa-Williams explained: "Just before her 10th birthday, Ari ended up getting arrested armed robbery and he went to jail. This left Chloe feeling very confused and hurt as to why he never came back home." The actor also said that Ari has mixed emotions about Chloe's arrival, as he knows that Mia will be close behind her and he is unsure about facing his past so soon. Mia turns up at Ari's door just as he is telling Mac about their history. Kipa Williams branded the exes "star-crossed lovers" and said they had a long history together. Ari knows that things were left unresolved between them and Kipa Williams believed that Ari never stopped loving Mia. After he breaks up with Mac, Ari has an awkward meeting with Mia in the gym. Kipa-Williams explained: "Ari doesn't actually tell Mia he's broken up with Mac, so Mia remains guarded and communicates with him like he's still in a relationship."

While Kipa-Williams was disappointed about the end of Ari and Mac's relationship, he relished the opportunity to explore his character's background further with Mia and Chloe. Kipa-Williams enjoyed working with Samson, as they got along well and he believed that showed on-screen as Ari and Mia reconcile. He also praised Barrett and explained how they got the chance to explore their characters' histories together, saying "you'll get to see a softer side of Ari in the way that Sam plays her character. And I think people will be surprised at the father figure that he has forgotten he is, or was." The first test of Ari and Mia's new relationship is his involvement with a criminal gang headed up by Paul (Jack Finsterer), which leads to the kidnapping of Chloe, Nikau, Bella, and Ryder Jackson (Lukas Radovich). Mia decides to leave the Bay with Chloe and tells Ari that she regrets letting him back into her life. Kipa-Williams commented that "Ari is heartbroken – he's faced with losing the love of his life." He sympathised with Mia, who is angry about her daughter being kidnapped. He also pointed out that Mia thought Ari had changed, so it "pains" her to think that he is still the same man who could end up in prison again. As Ari is walking along the road, he calls Chloe before she leaves town, and is struck by a car driven by Paul who then speeds off. Kipa-Williams said Ari is "blindsided" by the attack and described it as "a ruthless hit-and-run". Ari suffers multiple injuries and has to be placed in a medically induced coma due to a bleed on the brain.

Following Ari's recovery, writers scripted a pregnancy for Mia after the couple agree to try for a baby. Ari is "over the moon" when Mia tells him she is pregnant, but they decide to keep the news to themselves until they learn more about the pregnancy because of their history, which includes several miscarriages. An initial worry occurs when Mia is told her hormone levels are high, but the pair later learn that everything is fine with the baby and Mia is actually further along in the pregnancy than they first thought. An Inside Soap columnist wondered whether it would be "a smooth road to parenthood" for the couple this time round. During the show's 2021 mid-season finale, Mia is one of three characters involved in a life-threatening car accident. She and Dean go out to pick up Nikau, who has been stranded out of town, but on the way back Dean swerves to avoid hitting a kangaroo and the car is left hanging from a cliff edge. Mia does not suffer any serious injuries, but she miscarries. At the hospital, Ari is "stunned" when he sees Mia arrive and learns what has happened to their baby. He later breaks down in Tane's arms. The couple struggle in the wake of the miscarriage, as they morn the loss of their baby. Mia is cold towards Ari and struggles to talk to him, as he tries to help her settle back home after she is discharged. Ari continues to confide in Tane and he questions where his relationship with Mia stands.

The couple agree not to try for another baby and instead they turn to adoption. Samson thought that the storyline made sense for Ari and Mia, as they had been focused on having a child and it was "the next logical step for them". Samson admitted that she was not familiar with the topic, but found it to be really interesting. She also explained that Mia has "a bit of tunnel vision" and feels that adopting a child will solve her problems, where Ari is more realistic about their situation. Samson believed Mia was using it as a way to channel her grief. Later scenes see Ari and Mia discussing adoption with John because he adopted his son, and while his experience is different from what Ari and Mia's would be, he gives them hope. The couple soon realise that Ari's criminal record might put a halt to their plans. Samson said "It just makes Mia more determined! Ari is quite worried about it from early on, but nothing is going to stop Mia..." In addition to this, Jasmine Delaney (Sam Frost) offers to sell the gym to Mia, which excites her as she would have something of her own and it will look good on the adoption application. The couple later become engaged, after Ari proposes to Mia. Barrett commented that her character is "ecstatically happy" for her mother and Ari, as she knows how much they love each other.

Towards the end of 2021, producers introduced Chloe's biological father Matthew Montgomery (James Sweeny). This also led to further exploration of Mia's backstory, as it emerges that Matthew sexually assaulted her the night Chloe was conceived. A spokesperson for the serial told Sarah Ellis (Inside Soap) that Chloe has always seen Ari as a father figure because he has been in her life since she was young. Matthew turning up after 20 years and wanting a relationship with her is "too much for Ari to handle", especially with Ari knowing how he took advantage of Mia. Chloe forges a bond with Matthew, which angers Mia and Ari, who later punches Matthew during an argument. Matthew realises he can use Ari's criminal record to his advantage and warns Mia to back off, or he will report Ari's assault to the police. Matthew tries to take Chloe away from Mia by offering her the tuition to a prestigious college in the city. Ari believes that telling Chloe the truth about her conception will keep her in the Bay. Kipa-Williams stated: "Ari respects Mia's choice not to tell Chloe about what happened with Matthew, but he also wants to keep her from making decisions that may affect her wellbeing." After Chloe accepts Matthews's offer, Mia tells her the truth and Chloe finally understands Mia's behaviour towards Matthew. Ari later receives a phone call from Chloe asking for his help as Matthew has turned up at the house. Kipa-Williams pointed out that Ari believes Matthew is "unpredictable and dangerous" and would do anything to protect Chloe and Mia. The story sees Chloe accidentally kill Matthew when she hits him over the head with a brick to protect Mia.

=== Cancer diagnosis and departure ===
In the serial's first episodes of 2022, Ari takes the blame for Matthew's murder in order to protect Mia and Chloe. Ari is held on remand ahead of his sentencing hearing. Kipa-Williams explained that none of the Parata family can accept that Ari is going to prison. But he cannot accept seeing Chloe or Mia go there either, and he cannot work out a way where it would end well for them. Kipa-Williams continued, "He decides to take the fall because he knows he can handle it." Tane steps up as head of the family in Ari's absence, while Nikau pleads with his uncle to tell the police the truth. Kipa-Williams believed that his character's one regret was not marrying Mia. The storyline marked the beginning of Ari's exit from Home and Away, as he is later rushed to hospital with stabbing pains. Logan Bennett (Harley Bonner) initially thinks he may have appendicitis, but he later informs Ari that he has cancer of the appendix, which has spread to his abdomen. Logan also tells Ari that he could undergo a large, lengthy surgery to remove the tumours, but it would need to be repeated every few months. Ari decides not to go through with surgery as he wants to die on his terms.

Daniel Kilkelly of Digital Spy reported that rumours of Kipa-Williams' exit from the serial had been circulating for months. Mia makes a "moving" proposal that she and Ari get married at the hospital, which he accepts. Ari insists that the day is about "celebration, not commiseration", and he and Mia marry in front of Tane, Nikau, and Chloe. Their vows make everyone forget the "dire situation" for a moment, until Ari suddenly collapses. Ari succumbs to the cancer and his death aired on 7 March 2022. After the episode was broadcast aired, Kipa-Williams took to his Instagram account to post a thank you message to the show's cast, crew, and fans for their support. He said "This Iconic Ozzie TV show took risks. I'm honoured to have co-created Māori cultural storylines, and will forever be proud of those scenes that made it to screen.. it was true teamwork.. My hope is this opens the door for more diversity. Thank you for everything Ariki Wiremu Parata, you taught me a lot. I'm gonna miss you." The character made one final appearance on 15 March 2022, as Ari appears to Mia in a dream. The following year, Kipa-Williams revealed that he quit Home and Away because of "a calling" to the Māori culture. He moved back to Aotearoa, where he bought a farm and began lessons in te reo in order to become more fluent in the language.

== Reception ==
For his portrayal of Ari, Kipa-Williams received a nomination for Best Daytime Star at the 2020 Inside Soap Awards.

A writer for TVNZ was "thrilled" with the introduction of the Parata family and their connection to New Zealand. They believed that the family would "embody a taste of home, and we can't wait to see what Summer Bay has in store for them!" Kerry Harvey of Stuff pointed out that Paratas were "being hailed as New Zealand's answer to the show's much-loved River Boys". Bethany Reitsma of The New Zealand Herald believed that the Paratas would bring "a taste of classic Kiwi humour" to Home and Away. She also reported that New Zealand viewers were excited about a "Kiwi family" joining the show. Nick Everard and Jenny Ky from The Morning Show stated the Parata's arrival "rocked" Home and Away and their addition made "Summer Bay sizzle – and the fans can't get enough."

Rachel Lucas from What's on TV observed that Ari "certainly makes an impact during the hospital siege". While an Inside Soap columnist joked "If he's looking for peace and quiet, Ari has come to the wrong place! His new life in the Bay will probably turn out to be even more dramatic than the past he’s running from". Tahlia Pritchard from Punkee enjoyed Tane and Ari facing off against each other, calling it "the most compelling TV I've watched all iso." She also thought it was "hot" and found Tane and Ari to be "reminiscent of the River Boys but, well, sexier and with no shit tattoos." Stephanie McKenna of The West Australian branded Ari a "popular character".

McKenna found Ari and Chloe's reunion to be "very emotional" and thought it was obvious that they have "a good relationship". She called Ari "a pretty decent guy" and "smooth" for telling Mac about Chloe and Mia. McKenna thought Mac and Ari's break-up was sad, but also obvious to everyone, writing "We all saw the breakup coming but after everything Mac has done for the Parata's — she even gave them her Porsche as drug collateral — it cuts real deep and it's another heartbreak for Home and Away." She later admonished Ari for his actions, writing "Oh Ari, we expected so much better from you. Ari literally left Mac and moved his old girlfriend in immediately and he's somehow surprised that she can't handle the sight of him?" Digital Spy's Susannah Alexander and Daniel Kilkelly believed the serial "lost a solid couple" in Ari and Mac and that fans of the pair were "upset to see them go their separate ways."

After Ari and Mia learned they were expecting a baby, Stephen Downie of TV Week stated "If any couple deserves some happiness, it's Ari and Mia". McKenna later labelled Ari's final storyline "heart wrenching" and his wedding to Mia "bittersweet". Entertainment Daily's Steven Murphy said Ari's death "left viewers distraught" and was "a real shock" to those who had no idea Kipa-Williams was leaving the show. He also wrote "The demise was certainly dramatic. But it left many viewers wondering why Home and Away had killed off one of its most popular characters."
