= List of Home and Away characters introduced in 2019 =

Home and Away is an Australian television soap opera. It was first broadcast on the Seven Network on 17 January 1988. The following is a list of characters that appeared in 2019, by order of first appearance. All characters are introduced by the soap's executive producer, Lucy Addario. The 32nd season of Home and Away began airing from 18 February 2019. Mackenzie Booth was introduced in June, along with Ian and Wendy Shaw. August saw the debuts of Alex Neilson and Teresa Masterson. Jade Lennox made her first appearance in October. Ari Parata was introduced in November.

== Mackenzie Booth ==
Mackenzie Booth, played by Emily Weir, made her first appearance on 13 June 2019. Weir's involvement in the show had been made public months in advance due to paparazzi publishing photographs of her filming at Palm Beach. A reporter from Soap World even guessed that the character was named MacKenzie Booth and would be likely be the half-sister of established character Dean Thompson (Patrick O'Connor). Weir's casting and character details were officially announced on 10 June. Weir was attending an audition for another acting job when her agent called to inform her that she had won the role of Mackenzie. She commented, "I just screamed and started running around like a mad woman. It was such an overwhelming feeling; a dream come true." Mackenzie is the new owner of Summer Bay restaurant Salt. Describing her character, Weir said "Mackenzie is a very fierce and independent, smart woman. We don't really know what her motivation is for coming to the Bay – there is quite an element of mystery there." Jackie Brygel of New Idea also noted that buying the restaurant does not seem like Mackenzie's only reason for moving to the Bay, and dubbed the character "mysterious" and "fiery". On 20 June, it was officially revealed that Mackenzie is Dean's half-sister.

== Ian and Wendy Shaw ==
Ian and Wendy Shaw
- Home and Away character
- Portrayed by: Frankie J. Holden (Ian); Amanda Muggleton (Wendy)
- Duration: 2019–2020
- First appearance: 27 June 2019
- Last appearance: 30 July 2020
- Introduced by: Lucy Addario
In-universe information
- Occupation: Farmers
- Sons: Robbo; Daniel
- Daughters: Sarah
- Grandsons: Lucas Shaw
- Granddaughters: Sophia Shaw; Grace Morgan

Ian Shaw, played by Frankie J. Holden, and Wendy Shaw, played by Amanda Muggleton, made their first appearances on 27 June 2019. Of his casting, Holden stated "The role came about like everything seems to come about for me – someone, somewhere thought it would be a good idea to get me involved in the show." He also joked that he was offered the role because he had played a farmer on A Place to Call Home for six years, and the producers might have thought he seemed "like a bloke off the land". Muggleton said she was "thrilled" to be cast in Home and Away, adding "Thirty years was a long time to wait, but it was worth it! The crew, cast and creatives are so established and professional – it was made so easy." Ian and Wendy are Robbo's (Jake Ryan) parents. He brings his fiancée Jasmine Delaney (Sam Frost) to visit them at the family farm. However, Wendy is "protective" of her son and tells Jasmine that she does not approve of her marrying Robbo. Ian also shares his concerns with Robbo, and he and Wendy later tell him that they want him to move back to the farm.

Robbo visits his parents at their farm to introduce them to his fiancée Jasmine Delaney. Jasmine gives Ian and Wendy an invitation to their wedding, which she had wanted to personally deliver. Wendy asks Jasmine how she met Robbo, and how she feels about him having a child with Tori Morgan (Penny McNamee). Ian makes it clear that he is not happy about the baby, believing that Robbo was tricked into fatherhood. Robbo and Ian go off to do some work on the farm, leaving Jasmine alone with Wendy, who tells her that she and Ian do not approve of her or the impending marriage. Jasmine tries to reassure Wendy that she will not hurt Robbo again, after lying to him about Tori and the baby, leading to their break up. Robbo also realises that Ian has a problem with his relationship with Jasmine. Robbo tells his parents that he loves Jasmine and either they get on board, or they are leaving. Wendy and Ian talk, and deciding to accept the situation, they offer to cook a roast dinner and make up the spare room for Jasmine. They do not attend the wedding due to car trouble.

Months later, Ian and Wendy come to Summer Bay to meet their granddaughter Grace Morgan for the first time. They disapprove of Robbo's living situation, and later ask him and Jasmine to move to the countryside and raise Grace on the farm. Ian talks with Jasmine, who refuses to put any pressure on Robbo, while Wendy talks with her son, who accepts their offer. Robbo and Jasmine inform Wendy and Ian that they will move to the farm in four weeks time, after the trial of the Ouroboros gang is over. However, when Tori wakes from her coma, the couple change their plans. Shortly after, Wendy and Ian learn that Robbo has died. They return to the Bay for his funeral. Wendy helps Jasmine pick out a suit for Robbo to wear and some photos to be placed in the casket. Jasmine brings the couple to meet Tori for the first time and see Grace. Ian gives a eulogy at the funeral and tells the mourners a story about Robbo and his friend Lance Salisbury (Angus McLaren), whose father is in attendance. Wendy comforts Ian when he breaks down. At the wake, Wendy tells Jasmine that she is welcome at the farm any time, while Tori says that she will make sure that Grace knows all about her father. Ian thanks everyone for looking after their son during his time in the Bay, and the couple leave.

Wendy returns to the Bay after Jasmine informs her and Ian that she is pregnant. She spends time with Grace, and tells Tori that she does not need to attend Jasmine's scan, but Jasmine says that she wants Tori there as they are family. As the scan proceeds, Tori and Jasmine realise that there is no baby. Wendy asks how a woman can have all the symptoms but not be pregnant, and briefly wonders if Jasmine made it up, but Jasmine tells her the pregnancy test was positive. Tori confirms that Jasmine experienced a phantom pregnancy because of her grief at Robbo's death. Wendy later comforts Jasmine and tells her that they need to concentrate on Grace to get them through, before leaving for home. Weeks later, Jasmine shows up at the farm and stays with Ian and Wendy. She does not tell them why she has left the Bay and helps out around the farm. Her friends Irene Roberts (Lynne McGranger) and Colby Thorne (Tim Frankin) come to the farm and tell Ian and Wendy about Jasmine's recent behaviour towards Grace and Tori. Wendy and Ian agree that Jasmine needs some help and tell her that she should accept Irene and Colby's support. They also tell Jasmine that she cannot stay with them permanently because of the AVO against her, which could see them lose access to Grace while she is there. Jasmine agrees to return to the Bay and the Shaws say goodbye to her. When Wendy has a heart attack, Jasmine goes to the farm to help out and decides to stay there permanently.

== Alex Neilson ==
Alex Neilson
- Home and Away character
- Portrayed by: Zoe Ventoura
- Duration: 2019–2020
- First appearance: 22 August 2019
- Last appearance: 9 March 2020
- Introduced by: Lucy Addario
In-universe information
- Occupation: Doctor

Alex Neilson, played by Zoe Ventoura, made her first appearance on 22 August 2019. Ventoura's casting and character details were announced on 8 April 2019, a week after she began filming. Ventoura was living in Los Angeles when she was contacted by Home and Away producers about the role. She recalled, "I was sent the character information and asked if I was interested. I immediately loved the character – that's what got me in. She's strong and bold and smart and compelling. I loved how they have created her and written her on the page, and the storyline they have planned for her. It just seemed like a no-brainer."

Alex is Summer Bay's new doctor and head of emergency, who takes over the position while Tori Morgan (Penny McNamee) takes maternity leave. Having played a nurse on Packed to the Rafters, Ventoura relished the chance to play a doctor. She admitted that she was nervous about the medical terms, but she was looking forward to the challenge and wanted to do the role justice. She revealed that her first day took place on the hospital set and described it as "a real baptism of fire, a really hectic, crazy trauma situation" that her character is in control of. Ventoura described her character as "a complex woman with a lot of layers", while Jackie Brygel of New Idea said Alex has "a fabulously intriguing past". Brygel also said that Alex may be involved in a romance during her time in the Bay.

On her first day in charge of the Northern Districts Hospital ED, Alex attempts to treat a man who has been tortured by the Ouroboros gang, and learns that nurse Jasmine Delaney (Sam Frost) has to be accompanied an AFP officer. She questions whether the hospital is safe for Jasmine, and tells her that she has a duty of care to the other staff and patients. She later catches her having lunch with Willow Harris (Sarah Roberts) in an empty room. Willow offers Alex a free personal training session at the local gym, which she accepts. Alex treats Raffy Morrison (Olivia Deeble) after she has an epileptic seizure. She tells Raffy that she too has epilepsy and once had a seizure during an HSC exam. Raffy is inspired to try alternative treatments for her condition. Alex uses hypnotherapy to help Jasmine's husband Robbo (Jake Ryan) recover his lost memories. While he is under, Robbo attacks Alex and pins her against the wall. Mason Morgan (Orpheus Pledger) tries to help her and Robbo snaps out of it and leaves, but Alex persuades him to try again. Raffy talks with Alex when she suffers another seizure and mentions that Mason ran an illegal CBD oil trial for her. Alex tells Mason that she has put in a good word for his internship at Northern Districts. When he later tries flirting with her, Alex tells him that she is gay. Alex continues her PT sessions with Willow and they grow close. She also finds a new medicinal marijuana trial for Raffy and treats Scott Larkin (Trent Baines) when he is shot. Willow later thanks Alex for her support and tells her that she feels like she has known her for years, which leads Alex to kiss Willow.

== Teresa Masterson ==
Teresa Masterson
- Home and Away character
- Portrayed by: Simone McAullay
- First appearance: 28 August 2019
- Last appearance: 18 September 2019
- Introduced by: Lucy Addario

Teresa Masterson, played by Simone McAullay, made her first appearance on 28 August 2019. McAullay previously appeared in the serial as Vivian Anderson in 2007. She told a New Idea writer that she received the offer to play Teresa "out of the blue." She explained, "I've certainly come to a place now where I'm a lot more interested in the full spectrum of characters and that's why, when this role came up, I thought, 'Brilliant! I'd love to!'" McAullay also said that her character "has a lot of things going on", so she was happy to accept the part. Teresa is an activist who befriends Irene Roberts (Lynne McGranger) at a support group. A New Idea wrote "Simone is undoubtedly set to leave a truly memorable mark on the Bay."

Teresa is a member of a victims support group that Irene Roberts attends. She records a video about her sexual assault for Leah Patterson's (Ada Nicodemou) blog, which Irene watches in preparation for her trial for attacking Tommy O'Reilly (Adam Sollis). Teresa later arranges a supportive protest outside the courthouse during Irene's trial. She comes to Summer Bay to tell Irene and Leah about the next part of the plan, which involves Irene telling her story to the media. Irene refuses, as it may affect her case. Teresa reacts badly saying that Irene was more than happy with the group's support, but is not willing to give anything back. Leah later meets with Teresa and offers to take up her cause on her blog. Teresa continues to support Irene as her verdict comes in. After learning that Tommy has launched a civil suit against Irene, Teresa offers her help to fight it. She suggests that they publicly shame Tommy, and put enough pressure on him so he drops the case. Irene and Leah tell Teresa that they need to be careful, but she counters that Tommy could still go free, and suggests they make posters and online comments calling Tommy a rapist.

Teresa later finds Irene on the beach and warns her about trusting Leah, as she has been blocked from her website. Teresa reiterates that Tommy is going to walk free and wants to take action. Irene tells Teresa that she is grateful for her help, but she needs to obey the law so her hands are tied. Tommy's victim Bella Nixon (Courtney Miller) thanks Teresa for her protesting. The following day, Teresa turns up at the pier covered in blood and tells Irene and Bella that her hands were not tied, so she fixed it. Bella's brother Constable Colby Thorne (Tim Franklin) comes over and Teresa says she stopped Tommy for Irene and Bella. He takes her to the station, where she admits to fatally stabbing Tommy at his rehab centre. While visiting Teresa, Irene says she cannot condone her actions, while Leah mentions that Bella and the other girls will not get justice now. Teresa responds that she lost faith in the justice system after she lost her case against the ones who assaulted her, and tells them that because of this, she does not regret what she has done, before Irene and Leah leave her to be charged for murdering Tommy.

== Jade Lennox ==
Jade Lennox
- Home and Away character
- Portrayed by: Mia Morrissey
- Duration: 2019–2020
- First appearance: 22 October 2019
- Last appearance: 6 February 2020
- Introduced by: Lucy Addario
In-universe information
- Occupation: Bartender

Jade Lennox, played by Mia Morrissey, made her first appearance on 22 October 2019. The character and Morrissey's casting was announced shortly before her first scenes aired. Morrissey said it had been "a lifelong dream" of hers to appear on the serial, as she used to live near the set when she was younger and she would walk to it with her father. Morrissey planned to use her role to challenge beauty standards, as she does not fit the usual body types seen on the show. She explained, "Hopefully if someone sees someone like me who is a curvy size 10, who is incredibly healthy and fit, but I have stretch marks, if someone sees me in a bikini maybe they'll feel ok about themselves."

Jade is a backpacker and was initially introduced as a love rival for Ziggy Astoni (Sophie Dillman). Jade flirts with Ziggy's boyfriend Dean Thompson (Patrick O'Connor) when she takes surf lessons from him, causing tension between him and Ziggy, who soon tells Jade to back off. Ryder Jackson (Lukas Radovich) is attracted to Jade, so he befriends her and helps her secure employment at local restaurant, Salt. Of her character's reaction to Ryder, Morrissey stated: "Ryder is a bit like a puppy dog as far as Jade' concerned – and Jade loves all the attention and the fact that she has this power over Ryder. Jade's quite flippant and moves on as easily in her love life as she does in her travels." The character made her last appearance on 6 February 2020, after being driven out of Summer Bay by Ryder, whom she falsely blamed for uploading a sex tape of them to the internet. Morrissey admitted that she found it hard to play out Jade's actions at times, saying "Sometimes it was kinda hard. I mean, I know it's 'make believe'. But as an actor it's kinda your job to invest in your character and when your character and their actions go so against your own set of moral values it is... yeah... hard."

While attending surf lessons in Summer Bay, Jade flirts with her instructor Dean Thompson. She soon stops when she meets his girlfriend Ziggy Astoni. Jade attracts the attention of Ryder Jackson and she gets a job alongside him at Salt. Jade and Ryder go out on a date, and she warns his aunt Roo Stewart to back off when Roo comes to invite her to dinner. Ryder later loses his virginity to Jade, and she uses his infatuation with her to her advantage at work. When Ryder catches her taking money form the till at Salt, she tells him that she was just collecting her tips. Ryder pays the money back when their boss Mackenzie Booth (Emily Weir) notices the till is $50 down. Jade invites Ryder back to her caravan, but she asks him to leave in the morning when he questions her about taking the money. Ryder persists in asking Jade why she took the money and she tells him that her mother lost her job, so she took the money to help out her family. Ryder gets Jade a rent extension from his grandfather, but she continues to pocket money from Salt. When Ryder catches her stealing, he urges her to tell Mackenzie, but she refuses, so he does it for her and she is arrested. Upon her release, she apologises to Ryder and they have sex in her caravan, which she films.

Jade uploads the video to the internet using Ryder's phone and accuses Ryder of doing it without her consent, resulting in him being questioned and later charged by the police. Ryder confronts Jade, who refuses to take responsibility for her actions and she convinces Mackenzie and Bella Nixon (Courtney Miller) that he is guilty. Jade later provokes Ryder when they met on the beach and she records him talking to her. Nikau Parata (Kawakawa Fox-Reo) comes to her aid and warns Ryder to back off. He and Jade have a drink together and she tells him about the sex tape. Nikau later meets Jade for dinner and he tells her that he fought with Ryder. They kiss and continue spending time together. Jade is rude to Gemma Parata (Bree Peters) when she comes to Salt to drop off her CV, and Nikau reveals that Gemma is his mother. Jade tries to seduce Nikau in the store cupboard, but he stops her, finds her phone, which is set up to record them together, and takes it. He later tells her that he gave it to Ryder, and Jade goes to the Stewart house, where Ryder's grandfather is getting married. Ryder and Nikau find her searching for it and stop her, the resulting confrontation brings attention to them from the wedding guests, thus exposing Jade's lies to everyone. Ryder and Alf Stewart (Ray Meagher) tell Jade to leave town or else they will call the police on her with all the evidence they have. Realising that she has no choice and that all evidence is now pointed against her, Jade leaves the Bay in defeat.

== Ari Parata ==
Ari Parata, played by Rob Kipa-Williams, made his first appearance on 27 November 2019. Kipa-Williams was planning to quit acting and he had just finished training to be an insurance salesman when he received the role. He was initially contracted for three years, and he began filming in June 2019. Ari is the head of a Māori family from New Zealand. Ethan Browne plays Ari's brother Tane Parata and Kawakawa Fox-Reo was cast as his nephew Nikau Parata. Ari is among several characters caught up in a hostage situation at the local hospital in the show's 2019 season finale. Kipa-Williams explained that Ari ends up in the hospital after injuring himself at a nearby construction site. He helps Marilyn Chambers (Emily Symons) when she has a panic attack. Kipa-Williams commented, "I comfort her the way that I can, but for Ari, it's not his first rodeo when it comes to having danger around him." After the scenes aired, Kipa-Williams wrote a post in character on his social media. He confirmed that Ari's full name is Ariki Wiremu Parata and that he was born in New Zealand, before moving to Australia. He continued, "I've had a few challenges and those challenges brought me to Summer Bay... I love my whanau (family), I'll do anything for them, but never cross me".

== Others ==
Date(s)	Character	Actor	Circumstances
19 February	Unlucky Driver	Mark Duncan	The driver's vehicle is commandeered by Constable Colby Thorne and Dean Thompson after their car suffers a flat tyre.
19 February	Ambo	Elouise Eftos	The Ambo brings Willow Harris to Northern Districts Hospital, after she is shot.
7 March	Imogen	Caroline Oayda	A school student, who mocks Bella Nixon's lack of schooling and Raffy Morrison's epilepsy. Imogen later tells Maggie Astoni that Bella has left the class.
11 March	Mutt	Timothy Parsons	A friend of Dean Thompson, who sells him some sleeping pills.
14 March	River Boy	Uncredited	The River Boy sells Ryder Jackson marijuana.
27 March	Overdose Patient	Alex Jewson	The patient is found outside the hospital with a suspected overdose. Tori Morgan treats him, but when he wakes he is agitated and fights the nurses, before kicking Tori away.
3 April	Army Officer	Mitchell Why	The officer, accompanied by a chaplain, informs Lieutenant Jett Palmer's parents Marilyn Chambers and John Palmer that he has been critically injured in an explosion in Afghanistan and has been evacuated to Germany for treatment.
3–4 April	Army Chaplain Wilson	Kirk Page	The chaplain tells Marilyn Chambers and John Palmer that their son, Jett Palmer was close to the blast at his army base, and he has been left with severe shrapnel injuries and is undergoing exploratory surgery.
29 April, 13 June	Radiographer	Kate Fraser	The radiographer carries out Tori Morgan's 12-week scan. She tells Tori and the father, Robbo that everything looks normal. She later carries out Tori's 20-week scan.
2 May	Colonel Kate Porter	Emily Stewart	Porter and Haynes interview Lieutenant Jett James about an explosion in Afghanistan, which claimed the lives of some of his men and left him paralysed. Jett confirms he received a report about increased risk of suicide attacks on Police HQ and passed it on to his platoon, but he struggles to recall anything else due to a concussion. Jett tells them his platoon was having trouble with the internal comms, and he was talking with a Private when the explosion happened.
2 May	Lieutenant Colonel Gregory Haynes	Steve Cornor	Porter and Haynes interview Lieutenant Jett James about an explosion in Afghanistan, which claimed the lives of some of his men and left him paralysed. Jett confirms he received a report about increased risk of suicide attacks on Police HQ and passed it on to his platoon, but he struggles to recall anything else due to a concussion. Jett tells them his platoon was having trouble with the internal comms, and he was talking with a Private when the explosion happened.
9 May	Mark	Sam Delich	A man on the beach, who approaches Ziggy Astoni and tries to flirt with her. Dean Thompson tells him to take a hike. Ziggy later plays pool with him and his friends at the Surf Club. As the group leave for the Caravan Park, Mark's friend Drew notices Dean following them and Ziggy talks to him. As the group party, Mark asks Ziggy back to his van and attempts to kiss her. She walks away, but he grabs her arm, calling her a tease, and Dean intervenes. Mark waits for Dean to return to his van, and he and his friends beat him up, before Mark and Drew leave him out of town by the side of the road.
9 May	Drew	Danny Ball	One of Mark's friends, who brings alcohol down to the Surf Club from the bar upstairs, and is asked to get it out by John Palmer. The group leaves for the Caravan Park, where they party. Drew helps Mark beat up Dean Thompson and then drives them out of town, where they leave an unconscious Dean by the side of the road.
22 May–17 June	Aiden Wilcox	Socratis Otto	A counsellor who meets with Jasmine Delaney. He shows an interest in Robbo, who has accompanied her. Aiden helps calm Jasmine down when she admits that she gets panic attacks. He asks about Jasmine's father and Robbo's sudden departure. Aiden suggests that Robbo attend the remainder of the session. He asks Robbo about his past and why he left Jasmine. At the end, Aiden gives his card to Robbo, saying he needs counselling too. Robbo later meets with Aiden and tells him that he wants to get to a place in his life where he is ready to marry Jasmine, so he does not hurt her. Aiden tells Robbo that all of his experiences, good and bad, have made him who he is, and that is the man Jasmine wants to marry. Robbo contacts Aiden for advice, after he learns that his baby is at risk of being born early. Aiden tells him that he needs to know what the situation is before making plans. He adds that it is okay that Robbo took some time out, rather than stay at the hospital.
28–30 May	Lachy	Lachlan Fargher	One of the organisers of the Bush Bomb Rally, who greets Ziggy Astoni and Dean Thompson as they arrive at the meeting point. Lachy welcomes the gathered participants and tells them they will be getting the details of their first destination soon. At the end of the race, he takes a photo of the group.
28–30 May	Tanya	Georgia Scott	A married couple taking part in the Bush Bomb Rally, along with Ziggy Astoni and Dean Thompson. They overtake Ziggy and Dean, but their car soon breaks down. Ziggy briefly stops to check on them, but then leaves them by the side of the road. At the camp, Paul and Tanya invite Ziggy and Dean to drink with them. Paul reveals that he has stage four melanoma and the race was on his bucket list. Paul and Tanya later prank Ziggy and Dean by leaving prawns on their engine, creating a bad smell. Ziggy and Dean catch up to them and overtake their car, beating them to the finishing point.
28–30 May	Paul	Gary Clementson	
17 June	Obsetrician	Alyson Standen	An obstetrician, who informs Tori that while her baby is perfect, she has cervical weakness, which puts her at risk of going into early labour. Dr Andrews tells Tori that they will be starting her on progesterone and may consider putting in a stitch later. Standen is credited as "Obsetrician", but her name is given as Dr Andrews in dialogue.
11 July–5 September	Tommy O'Reilly	Adam Sollis	A man who begins chatting with teenager Bella Nixon after they connect in an online student forum. He manipulates Bella into staying with her guardian, instead of moving back in with her brother. He later tells her that he is actually a twenty-five year old school teacher. Tommy sends Bella a camera so she can take photographs of herself for an assignment, and he hacks her webcam to spy on her. He also provides Bella with a ticket to a photography exhibition and later offers to pick her up and drive her there. Tommy sees Bella and her friend Raffy Morrison at the meet up point, but he decides not to approach them and drives off. Tommy and Bella reschedule, and Tommy shows up at Bella's home. His behaviour scares Bella and she hides in the bathroom. Tommy pretends to leave, but when Bella emerges, Tommy grabs her and she bites his arm. He follows her into a bedroom, telling her that he is sick of girls not keeping their promises. He attempts to sexually assault her, but Irene Roberts hears Bella cry out and she strikes Tommy with a vase, rescuing Bella. Immediately, Tommy chickens out as both Bella and Irene angrily order him to leave the house, but when Tommy cowardly begs them not to tell anyone and keep it a secret, he inadvertently provokes Irene to viciously attack him with a bottle, knocking him unconscious. Bella and Irene leave Tommy at the local hospital. After his car is found, Colby Thorne learns that his full name is Thomas O'Reilly. Irene eventually confesses to the police, and she visits Tommy in the hospital. Shortly after, he regains consciousness and Colby places him under arrest for attempted sexual assault and possession of child pornography. Tommy attends Irene's trial and lies about the attack on the stand. Bella struggles to give her statement with Tommy in the room, but a day later, she gains the courage to do so, and explains Irene's actions and denounces Tommy as a rapist. Although Irene is found guilty of attacking Tommy, she does not receive a custodial sentence. Tommy then launches a civil action suit against Irene, who considers settling. To prevent this from occurring, Teresa Masterson ambushes Tommy at a rehab centre and stabs him to death, with Teresa soon confessing to what she has done and also revealing that Tommy spent his final moments trying to talk his way out of it, similar to his cowardly behavior towards Irene. Shortly after, Tommy's family decide not to go ahead with the civil action suit, thus clearing Irene of any charges. The character was credited as just Tommy, but his surname O'Reilly was mentioned in dialogue.
11 July 2019 – 27 January 2020	Scott Larkin	Trent Baines	One of Robbo's former AFP colleagues, who attends his wedding to Jasmine Delaney. He tells his sergeant, Lance Salisbury to take a phone call ahead of the ceremony. Scott later comes to Tori Morgan's home and tells her she is being taken into protective custody. Scott and Lance stay with Robbo, Tori and Jasmine Delaney at the safe house. After Lance decides to go back into the field to continue the investigation, Scott remains with Tori and he apologises for them being stuck with each other. Scott returns to the Bay and goes to the motel where Robbo and Jasmine are staying, but Jasmine tells him Robbo is not back yet. She questions why Scott is not with Tori, but he claims there is a roster issue and Lance has stepped in to take care of her. Jasmine makes Scott tell her where Robbo has gone and he admits that they have lost contact with him. Scott later helps Robbo look for Jasmine when she leaves the motel, and he accompanies her to the hospital when she resumes work. Scott continues to aid Robbo, as he tries to find Dylan Carter. He later drives Jasmine out of the Bay to the airport, but they are ambushed and Scott is shot. After undergoing surgery at the hospital, Scott gives Robbo and Colby Thorne all the details he can remember. He is then transferred to a hospital in the city, and later returns to the safe house with Tori and Jasmine. Days later, Tori goes into labour and Scott calls Robbo to let him know, so that he can get there on time. Scott is later corrupted by the Ouroboros gang, who threaten his family. He kills Lance and is sent to kill Robbo, who tries to convince him not to. They struggle for control of the car, but it crashes and Scott is killed.
11 July	Priest	David Baldwin	The priest marries Robbo and Jasmine Delaney.
18 July	Journalist	Branden Christine	The journalist attempts to question Dean Thompson about his father Rick Booth. She also asks Ziggy Astoni if she is Dean's girlfriend and what she knows about Rick. John Palmer prevents the journalist from following Dean inside the Surf Club.
18 July	Ted	John O'Hare	A reporter who questions Dean Thompson about his father Rick Booth and the money Rick gave him. John Palmer stops Ted and the other journalists from coming inside the Surf Club. Ted manages to gain entry and asks Dean for a quote about his mother. Ted later photographs Dean punching Rick, who arranged for Ted to be there.
23 July	AFP Officer	Simon Barbaro	The AFP Officer accompanies Robbo and Jasmine Delaney back to Summer Bay. He performs safety checks around their flat and after confirming it is clear, Robbo tells him where to install a gun safe.
23 July	Amy	Danielle Clements	A woman enjoying drinks at Salt with her friends. She and Samantha are attracted to barman Ryder Jackson.
23–24 July	Samantha	Emily Edwards	Another member of the group enjoying drinks at Salt. After Amy leaves, she approaches the bar and gives Ryder Jackson a big tip, before introducing herself. She continues to give Ryder tips and invites him to join her and her friends in Yabbie Creek. He turns her offer down, as he is working, and Samantha gives him her phone number before leaving. Edwards was uncredited for her appearance in Episode 7164.
25 July	Nurse Rodgers	Madeline Exarhos	A nurse who is checking on Thomas O'Reilly when Colby Thorne enters his room. She tells Colby that Tommy is doing well and to go easy on him, as he has only been off life support for a few hours.
6–22 August	Joe (AFP Officer)	Adam Nayel	The AFP officer escorts Robbo and Jasmine Delaney from the pier flat in Summer Bay to a motel. While he is on duty outside the room, Robbo asks whether Jasmine and Scott Larkin are back, but the officer tells him no one has gone in or out of the room.
7 August – 2 October	AFP Officer Dave	Brenton Prince	Federal officer Dave asks Robbo if he is ready to leave the motel. Robbo tells him to monitor who is coming and going, and to provide him with hourly updates. Dave assures him that his wife Jasmine Delaney is in safe hands. Dave is later assigned to guard Jasmine at the pier flat in Summer Bay.
12 August–27 November	Des Hendrix	Matt Zeremes	A man who contacts Robbo telling him to meet at a wharf. Des tells Robbo to get on a boat and has his hands bound, and head covered by a hood. Des finds a tracker in Robbo's sock and throws it in the water, before bringing Robbo to his boss, Victor Devlin. A week later, Robbo arranges to meet with Des at Salt, and hands him a file containing an autopsy report for Dylan Carter. Des realises that it is fake and Robbo says he does not know where Dylan is. Des says Robbo is no use to them now, but Robbo asks for more time to find Dylan. He wants to work with Des and use the information they already have, but Des drives off. Des later has Robbo's wife Jasmine Delaney kidnapped. He allows her to treat Lenny, who was shot by an AFP officer, but grows impatient when she cannot remove the bullet. After dumping Lenny by the side of the road, Des and Fitz move Jasmine to an old power plant. Robbo and the police soon turn up looking for them, and Des attempts to move Jasmine out, but she attracts Robbo's attention and manages to break free of Des's hold on her. He and Fitz flee. Robbo later contacts Des, asking to see Victor, as he has Dylan Carter. Des is arrested by the AFP. Des is brought to Robbo for questioning about Dylan and Lance Salisbury's deaths.
12 August–27 November	Victor Devlin	Patrick Thompson	The Ouroboros gang leader. Robbo is brought to Victor, who tells him that he was surprised when he reappeared, as he thought he was dead. He asks Robbo where Dylan Carter is, and when Robbo says Dylan is dead, Victor has him beaten. Robbo explains that a blow to the head left him with amnesia and Dylan's blood was found on a boat. Victor demands that Robbo finds Dylan in one week or his wife will be harmed. He then has him knocked out and set adrift in a boat. Months later, Robbo finds Dylan and gets Victor to meet him at a factory for the hand over. Robbo asks Victor if he killed his family. Des Hendrix tells Victor to admit it, so they can go. They are interrupted by the AFP, who arrest everyone, but Victor runs off pursued by Robbo. On the roof of the factory, Victor goads Robbo into shooting him by admitting to killing his family. Robbo arrests him instead. Victor is later brought to Robbo for questioning and he makes a remark about Jasmine having a good day at work, proving that he is behind a hostage situation at the hospital.
15 August–	Blake	Tom Wilson	A friend of Ryder Jackson, who comes to the caravan park to help him set up for a party. He and Josh realise that they have not got any alcohol and convince Ryder to get some from the restaurant where he works. Blake and Tyler protest when Alf Stewart and their teacher Roo Stewart break up the party. He tells Roo that the alcohol was already there and he does not know who bought it. Blake later takes a free surf lesson with Ben Astoni. Blake tells Ryder about a cheating scheme he, Tyler and Josh have started. After Josh and Tyler are caught swapping papers, Blake worries about the upcoming history exam. He then suggests that he drugs the exam supervisor with a sleeping pill. Ryder tries to put him off the idea, but Blake is determined to go through with it. He swaps water bottles with Maggie Astoni, who is supervising the exam. However, Ryder knocks the bottle out of Maggie's hand before she can drink it. Ryder asks Blake to admit what he did, but he refuses. Ryder tells Maggie and she reports Blake to the police, who arrest him.
15 August–	Josh	Ash Sakha	A friend of Ryder Jackson, who helps set up for a party Ryder is hosting at the local caravan park. Josh and Blake realise that they have no alcohol and convince Ryder to get some from Salt.
19 August–	Tyler	Prescot Palmer	A student who attends a party at the local caravan park. He protests when Alf Stewart extinguishes the fire, and tells Roo Stewart that he does not know who bought the alcohol. He flees when Roo threatens to call everyone's parents.
22 August	Thug #1	Nadim Accari	A man who accompanies Des Hendrix to a meeting with Robbo at Salt.
22 August	Sean Coulson	Taylor Wiese	A badly beaten man who is thrown out of a car onto the side of a road. He is soon found and taken to Northern Districts Hospital, where AFP officer Scott Larkin notices a distinctive snake logo has been carved into his chest. Sean goes into cardiac arrest and dies. Scott and Robbo later find a phone on Sean's body and listen to a recording of him being interrogated about his connection to Dylan Carter.
5 September – 2 October	Fitz	Nathan Sapsford	Two men sent to ambush the car taking Jasmine Delaney to the airport. Lenny is shot by AFP officer Scott Larkin, who is also shot, but he and Fitz manage to kidnap Jasmine and drive off with her. At their hideout, Fitz struggles to stop Lenny's bleeding, so their boss Des Hendrix tells Jasmine to help him. Needing to remove the bullet, Jasmine gives Fitz a list of supplies she needs. Lenny advises Jasmine not to run, as Des will hurt her. Fitz brings back the supplies, which he stole from a local pharmacy, angering Des. Lenny later ends up in the local hospital with sepsis and is confronted by Jasmine's husband Robbo, who demands to know where she is. After almost dying, Lenny eventually tells Colby Thorne where Des and Fitz took Jasmine. Robbo and Colby find Des and Fitz at an old power plant. After Jasmine escapes from Des, Fitz urges him to leave and they eventually flee in their car. Fitz is later arrested by the AFP.
5–19 September	Lenny	Joseph Del Re	
2–3 October	Mike	Josef Brown	A doctor who delivers Tori Morgan and Robbo's daughter. He later tries to help Tori when she collapses.
3 October 2019 – 27 September 2021	Grace Morgan	Various babies	The infant daughter of Tori Morgan and Robbo. Shortly after her birth, Tori collapses with postpartum pre-eclampsia. She and Grace are transferred to a local hospital. Robbo introduces Grace to her uncles Mason Morgan and Justin Morgan, and he and his wife Jasmine Delaney take care of her while Tori is in a coma. When Tori wakes up six weeks later, she claims Grace is not her baby and that she feels nothing for her. Tori later realises that Grace is her baby when she views a photo album Jasmine made for her, but she is upset that she missed out on a lot of time and first moments with her daughter. Robbo later hands Grace over to Tori when he has to go back to work for the AFP. She decides to discharge herself from hospital to take Grace home, as she is not settling well. Robbo later dies in a car accident and Tori is left to raise Grace by herself. Jasmine becomes obsessed with Grace and pretends to be her mother online. After Grace is accidentally kidnapped by Nikau Parata, Jasmine's obsession becomes worse and she starts badmouthing Tori behind her back and telling everyone on a parenting forum how much of a bad mother Tori is. Tori is forced to ban Jasmine from seeing Grace until she gets help. Tori meets and starts dating Christian Green. The couple marry and the family move to London.
7 October	Dr Lisa Booker	Kellie Jones	The doctor treating Tori Morgan, who is brought in to the hospital with postpartum pre-eclampsia. Tori suffers a seizure upon arrival and later goes into cardiac arrest, but Dr Booker and the nurses stabilise her. Dr Booker informs Tori's brothers that Tori has had a stroke and may have a serious brain injury, but it will not be known until she wakes from her coma.
7 October, 7 November	Nurse Frankie	Mia Donatelli	A nurse who takes care of newborn Grace, after she is brought in with her mother Tori Morgan. Nurse Frankie informs Robbo that Grace has been checked over by a paediatrician, and she will organise a place in the nursery for her.
15 October 2019 23 April 2020	Stella	Anna Phillips	A new personal trainer hired by Willow Harris for Summer Bay Fit. Stella carries out a gym session at the beach. Stella is placed in charge when Willow goes away, but a misunderstanding means she fails to open up the gym, causing owner Jasmine Delaney to come down and do it. On her return, Willow fires Stella.
31 October–21 November	Kurt	Dylan Hare	A husband and wife mechanic and driver. Ziggy joins their pit crew on a trial and Kurt is initially hard on her, as she struggles to change a tyre in ten seconds. Alana assures Ziggy that she is doing well, and that Kurt is tough on all the newbies. After overhearing Ziggy saying she is ready to quit, Alana encourages her by revealing that she did not get a start for six years. Ziggy stays behind to practice and earns Kurt's respect when she changes the tyre in time. Ziggy rejoins the team a few weeks later on a permanent basis. Kurt runs the team through several practice runs and Alana invites her to a party for the crews. Kurt sees Ziggy with rival team member Joe and jokes about him poaching her. Alana watches them interact and drinking together, and comes over to warn Ziggy not to get used by Kurt, as it could ruin her career. Alana and Kurt argue, and Kurt apologises to Ziggy, telling her that she has done nothing wrong. Ziggy later quits the team.
31 October–21 November	Alana Bentley	Erin Clare	
31 October	Yvonne Wise	Danielle King	An AFP lawyer, who visits Jasmine Delaney and Robbo to go over their statements ahead of the Ouroboros gang trial. After Jasmine is done, Yvonne wants to talk with Robbo about the murder of his family, but he refuses and asks her to leave.
14 November	Student Surfer	Tayla Stevenson	The surfer asks if she and the other students will get refunds when their instructor Dean Thompson cancels their lesson. Mackenzie Booth tells them that they will and offers them all a free pizza at Salt.
20 November	Con	Adam Kovarik	A couple who come to Salt for dinner. Dean Thompson accidentally bumps into Carla and apologises, but Con tells him to watch where he is going. Mackenzie Booth tells them that they are welcome to a free drink at the bar to defuse the situation. Carla later notices Dean's phone is ringing and he tells her to answer it, as he is arguing with Mackenzie. Carla tells the caller, Ziggy Astoni, that Dean is busy and asks if she can take a message. Con asks Dean whether he is hitting on his girlfriend, and when Dean replies that he might be, Con walks forward and Dean punches him. They start to fight, but Mackenzie, a waiter and then Colby Thorne break them up.
20 November	Carla	Claudia Cranstoun	
21 November	Joe	Frazer Lee	A mechanic from a rival race team, who attends a party for the crews. He notices Ziggy Astoni and comes over to talk to her. He later competes with her and Kurt in a drinking game. Joe later goes to Ziggy's motel room and they kiss.
26 November	Jack	Dylan Benson	A guy who comes into the diner with his friends and asks Jade Lennox for an autograph, having seen her in a sex tape. He tells her to let him know if she needs another co-star, and Jade tells him she is not that desperate.
27 November 2019, 27 January 2020	Senior Constable Jay Myers	Edmund Lembke-Hogan	AFP officer Myers introduces himself to Jasmine Delaney, who he is protecting that day at the hospital, and her husband Robbo, who recognises him from an old case. When gunmen enter the emergency department, Myers surrenders his weapon to them and sits with the hostages. Jasmine suspects it might have something to do with the Ouroboros gang and Myers confirms her suspicions when she spots the gang's symbol tattooed on one of the gunmen, and reveals himself to be in league with them. Myers takes charge after Mason Morgan is fatally shot. He allows Alex Neilson to get some charcoal for Bella Nixon, who is suffering from an overdose. He is arrested alongside the gunmen when the police finally enter the hospital.
27 November 2019, 27 January 2020	Phil	Greg Hatton	Phil and Reg take several hostages in the Northern Districts Hospital emergency apartment at gunpoint. They force them to lay on the ground, before gathering them together and taking their phones. Both Mason Morgan and Ari Parata try standing up to them, as there are sick patients amongst the hostages. Mackenzie Booth later emerges from one of the rooms and is forced to join the hostages. Reg starts getting nervous that things are taking too long, but Phil tells him not to lose his head and to stick to the plan. Phil catches Alex Neilson when she leaves the group and he finds a sick Bella Nixon in the examination room. He berates Reg for not checking everywhere and refuses to let Alex and Mason get supplies to help Bella. Mason is shot when he, Alex, Jasmine Delaney and Marilyn Chambers plead with Phil and Reg to let them help Bella. They move his body to a side room and Jay Myers then takes charge of the situation. Both Phil and Reg urge Myers to find out if Robbo has been taken care of, so they can leave. All three are soon arrested by the police.
27 November 2019, 27 January 2020	Reg	Gareth Rickards	
27 November 2019, 26 May 2026	Nurse	Olga Olshanksy	The nurse is among those held hostage at the hospital. Reg finds her hiding and drags her over to sit with the others. Some years later, the nurse takes blood from Mackenzie Booth for a beta-hCG test to confirm a miscarriage.
27 November	AFP Officer	James Slattery	The AFP Officer brings Des Hendrix in for questioning by Robbo.
27 November 2019, 27 January 2020	Reporter	Matthew Backer	The reporter updates viewers on events in the Northern Districts Hospital, where gunman have taken several people hostage.
