= Bella Nixon =

- Home and Away character
- Portrayed by: Courtney Miller
- Duration: 2018–2023
- First appearance: 26 November 2018
- Last appearance: 2 March 2023
- Introduced by: Lucy Addario
In-universe information
- Occupation: Student; Photographer
- Father: Ross Nixon
- Mother: Michelle Thorne
- Half-brothers: Colby Thorne

Bella Nixon is a fictional character from the Australian television soap opera Home and Away, played by Courtney Miller. The actress previously appeared in the serial as an extra. When the part of Bella came up, Miller felt a strong connection to the character and storyline. She was cast in June 2018 and Home and Away marks her first major television role. She made her first appearance during the episode broadcast on 26 November 2018. The character was introduced as the younger half-sister of Colby Thorne (Tim Franklin) and she received several on-screen mentions as part of his early storylines. Bella's fictional backstory establishes that she and her mother were taken away by her father Ross Nixon (Justin Rosniak) when she was young. Bella is portrayed as sheltered, but independent and feisty. Miller found herself being able to live out her rebellious side through her, and she uses her qualifications in psychology and rehabilitation counselling to help her portray Bella's feelings.

Miller praised Bella's unglamorous and realistic style as a positive characteristic for young female viewers to see. When Colby and Bella are reunited, Bella protects herself with a crossbow and Franklin described her as "completely feral". Bella moves to Summer Bay with Colby, but Miller said she is greatly affected by Ross's crimes and lies. The character's early storylines dealt with Ross's return, as he kidnaps her and tries to get revenge on Colby, her fears that she is messing up Colby's life, and her rebellious behaviour, which results in a new living situation. The script writers used the character to highlight the growing issue of online predators targeting and grooming young Australians. Bella's predator, 25-year-old Tommy O'Reilly (Adam Sollis) attempts to sexually assault her when they meet, but is stopped by Irene Roberts (Lynne McGranger). Miller hoped the storyline would lead to more awareness of the issue, and she later received positive feedback from parents after the scenes aired.

Towards the end of 2019, Bella starts feuding with Mackenzie Booth (Emily Weir), after she breaks up with Colby. Miller believed that Bella sees Mackenzie as a threat and wants to get revenge. She is also diagnosed with tetanus, and she uses her illness to manipulate Colby into spending all his time with her. Bella and Mackenzie are among several characters caught up in a siege at the hospital during the 2019 season finale. Mackenzie risks her own life to save Bella, who has taken an overdose. Miller received a nomination for the Logie Award for Most Popular New Talent for her portrayal of Bella. The character's introduction was branded memorable by New Idea's Jackie Brygel, while her polarising behaviour led one critic from Inside Soap to call her "trouble with a capital 'T'". The character departed during the episode broadcast on 2 June 2022, as she moves to New York City for work. She later made a brief appearance on 21 July 2022, before returning for a longer stint from 23 February until 2 March 2023.

== Casting ==
The character received several on-screen mentions following the introduction of her elder brother Colby Thorne (Tim Franklin) in February 2018. Miller's casting as Bella was confirmed in September when she replaced injured co-star Olivia Deeble at the Bundaberg Ability Ball. Miller had appeared in the serial as an extra when she was 15. Years later, she attended three auditions for roles, including that of Ziggy Astoni, which went to Sophie Dillman. When the part of Bella came up, Miller felt "a strong connection" to the character and her storyline, despite there being very few similarities between them. Miller met Franklin at the audition and he commented, that "she was my pick" of all the actresses. Miller learned she had been cast in June 2018, and she had to keep the news to herself until her on-screen debut. Miller, who was studying psychology at university at the time, did not put much pressure on herself to secure the part. Home and Away marks Miller's first major television role. Her first scenes aired on 26 November 2018.

== Development ==
=== Characterisation ===
Miller described Bella as "an independent – but sheltered – 16-year-old who is still discovering herself and the world around her. Although she is feisty, underneath her hard exterior, she wants to be loved." She called Bella "a bit cheeky" and someone who "will tell it how she sees it". Miller also said that Bella wants to fit into the Bay, but as she is not sure how, it leads to her vulnerable side coming out. Miller, who is around six years older than her character, found herself being able to live out her "rebellious side" through Bella.

"A lot of people have said they feel like I reach out to those girls who are not the cliché, who don't know who they are, who don't know what they want and I really feel like I am an advocate for those girls. I feel very special to be able to play a difficult character because we are not all beautiful Summer Bay stereotypes."

— Miller on her character's impact on female viewers. (2019)

She admitted that she was nothing like Bella in school and never received a detention, which makes the character fun for her to portray. She commented, "I think it's good being older because I know when I can tap into the emotions that I did feel when your hormones are a little bit everywhere. It's good looking back and being able to play it."

Miller did not think she and Bella would be close friends in real life, but she could sympathise with her. Kerry Harvey of Stuff.co.nz pointed out that Bella has been popular with girls who watch Home and Away, and Miller believed that it was partly due to Bella's style, which she described as unglamorous and realistic. Miller liked looking "a bit rough on screen, in like the hair's never perfect and the clothes are never perfect", which she thought was a positive thing for younger female viewers to see.

Miller's qualifications in psychology and rehabilitation counselling help her to portray how Bella is feeling during her storylines. She explained to Harvey that she uses her knowledge of PTSD and bi-polar to justify Bella's behaviour and what she says and feels. She also told Jackie Brygel of New Idea: "Helping people has always been a part of my life and I think that's one of the reasons I love acting – because I get to empathise with a character. I really love playing Bella, because she is ultimately a troubled child due to her upbringing, and I wanted to bring some truth to that."

Bella's behaviour is greatly affected by her father, his crimes and death. Her feisty persona helps her avoid getting close to anyone, as she fears they will leave or do something bad. Miller added, "Her dad who she thought she loved has killed her mum and then her brother who she began to love has now killed her dad. I think it now sets up for tough issues within Bella." Miller believed that when Bella plans to get revenge on those that have wronged her or Colby, she thinks it is acceptable because she saw her father do it. In November 2019, Miller confirmed that Bella's behaviour will begin to change and improve. She hoped that viewers would like the new side of Bella, as she just gets to be a teenager for a while.

=== Introduction ===
The character's fictional backstory established that she and her mother were taken away by her father Ross Nixon (Justin Rosniak), leaving behind her half-brother Colby, who began searching for them. Scenes airing in November 2018 saw Colby gain an address for Ross, shortly after learning that he killed Colby and Bella's mother. When Colby and his friend Dean Thompson (Patrick O'Connor) eventually track Bella down, her first instinct is to protect herself with a crossbow. Franklin described Bella as "completely feral" and said Colby had imagined they would have a much happier reunion. After firing the crossbow, Bella flees and hides out in the backyard. Miller explained her character's reaction: "Bella is terrified – she's been told repeatedly by her dad that Colby is not to be trusted. Her first instinct is to protect herself, and she won't leave without a fight, or firing an arrow." Jackie Brygel of New Idea observed that Bella is "traumatised", while Miller said her character views Colby as an enemy thanks to her father.

Miller admitted that she was already nervous about filming her first scene before she was handed the crossbow. But she felt the weight of the weapon helped her get into character, saying "as an actor, it allowed me to place all my nervous energy into one solid object." A safety officer was present on set, and the potential for something to go wrong helped Miller and Franklin to bond. Knowing that his violent stepfather could return home at any moment, Colby decides to kidnap Bella. Franklin believed his character has no other option but to take Bella against her will. He and Dean take her to an old River Boys gang hideout, where they attempt to undo Ross's brainwashing. Upon hearing about Ross's criminal history, Bella initially denies it, as she questions how her father, who has protected her, could be that bad. Miller told Inside Soap's Sarah Ellis that most of Bella's "anger and hints of her dark personality" comes from learning this information, as she wonders if her childhood has been a lie. Colby eventually brings Bella back to Summer Bay to live with him.

=== Early storylines ===
Bella's arrival causes tension and a break-up between Colby and his fiancée Chelsea Campbell (Ashleigh Brewer), who realises that he lied to her and kidnapped his own sister. Bella goes through "a harrowing" police interview about her parents, which leaves her feeling responsible for her mother's death. She also feels guilty about Colby and Chelsea's break-up, and encourages the couple to talk. Following Colby and Chelsea's reconciliation, the family take a break off-screen. Upon their return, they announce they are moving to the city after the wedding. Chelsea and Bella then come into conflict over Bella's schooling, as Chelsea wants her level of education assessed.

During the show's 2018 season finale, Colby and Chelsea marry, and an armed Ross takes Bella, Chelsea and Willow Harris (Sarah Roberts) hostage. The first episodes of the new season focused on resolving the cliffhanger. Bella tries to reason with her father, but soon learns that Ross wants revenge on Colby for taking her away from him. He plans to lure Colby into a trap and kill him. Colby opts not to call in back up and goes to meet Ross with Dean. He finds Chelsea and Bella tied up, while Dean helps an unconscious Willow. Ross tries to force Colby into choosing between his wife and his sister, but he runs at him and Bella strikes his arm to force him into dropping the gun, which goes off. Miller commented, "Ultimately, there are some things you just can't recover from. It's an incredibly intense time." Franklin explained that after Colby witnesses Ross shooting Willow, he believes that Ross will not stop until he has killed everyone Colby loves, so he shoots Ross dead. Colby initially keeps Ross's death a secret from Bella, but when he learns that she is worried that her father will return, he decides to tell her the truth. He admits that he was trying to protect her, but "a terrified" Bella struggles to understand what he is saying, before he admits that Ross is dead.

The character's early storylines also dealt with her fears that she is "messing up" Colby's life, after she overhears him telling his Sergeant that he is unable to return to work, as he is too busy caring for her. Bella runs away and her disappearance leads Colby, Dean and Willow to come together to find her. Bella also worries that she is going to lose the "family" she has in Willow and Dean, when the latter grows closer to Ziggy Astoni (Sophie Dillman). She stows away in the boot of their car as they head to a rally, with the aim of revealing herself once they are far enough away. Bella hopes the pair will return her to the Bay, so she can reunite Dean with Willow, but Dean calls Colby to collect her instead. The scenes were filmed on-location in Flinders Ranges.

Colby struggles with Bella's rebellious behaviour, and after she lashes out and hurts him during an argument with Dean, he accepts an offer from Irene Roberts (Lynne McGranger) to take her in. An Inside Soap writer wondered whether Irene would be able to get through to Bella, and commented "has she bitten off more than she can chew this time?" When Irene plans a trip overseas, Colby asks Bella to move back in with him for a while. Bella is initially keen, until she spots her brother flirting with newcomer Mackenzie Booth (Emily Weir). She changes her mind and questions his priorities.

=== Online grooming and assault ===
In mid-2019, the show's script writers took inspiration from Carly's Law and used the character to highlight the growing issue of online predators targeting and grooming young Australians. The storyline was scripted to run for three months and filming began in February. Bella is introduced to an online student forum by her teacher Roo Stewart (Georgie Parker) and she soon befriends fellow user Tommy (Adam Sollis). She confides in him about her family and living situation, having recently moved in with Irene Roberts. As they continue communicating, Tommy asks Bella for photos and further personal details. Bella initially believes Tommy is a fellow high school student, but later learns that he is a 25-year-old teacher.

Miller was keen to do the storyline in the hope that it would provoke conversation and awareness, stating "I really wanted to do this story because I think it's very powerful and can connect with a lot of people. At first I was thinking (Tommy) would be a bit older, that he would be an older man, but really it connects more so that he is young." Wanting to add realism to the storyline, Miller watched documentaries about the victims of online predators, so she could learn how they talk about their experiences. The show's producers also talked with the eSafety Commissioner to make sure the plot was realistic. Series producer Lucy Addario confirmed that Bella was chosen for the storyline because "she had no previous exposure to social media conventions."

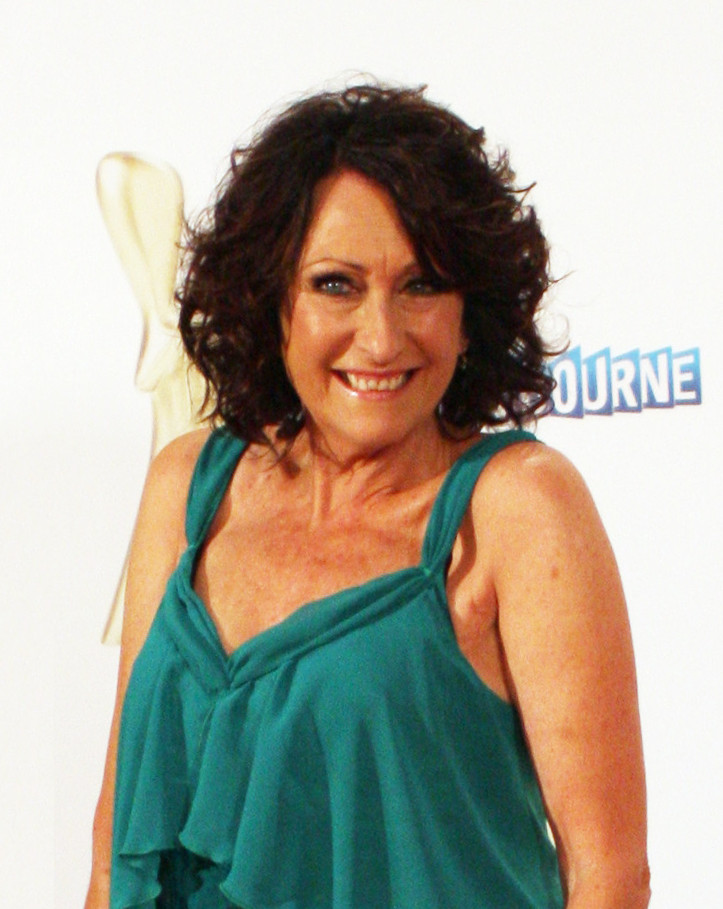
Bella's rescue from an online predator by Irene Roberts (actress Lynne McGranger pictured) has big consequences for them both.

Tommy visits Bella at home, and Miller said that Bella is shocked to see him on her doorstep and she quickly realises that she could be in trouble. Tommy makes attempts to reassure Bella and claims that he just wanted to meet her in person. Tommy's jealousy over Bella's friendship with Ryder Jackson (Lukas Radovich) prompts her to panic and she eventually locks herself in the bathroom, hoping that Tommy will leave. However, when she emerges Tommy grabs her and drags her into a nearby bedroom, where he attempts to sexually assault her. Miller admitted that she found the scenes difficult to film, and she became scared as she imagined it being a real-life situation. The actress praised Sollis for helping her out, and she told Williams: "The more more we (rehearsed), the more comfortable it became and the more truth I felt I could give to it."

Irene is brought into the storyline when she returns home to find Tommy attacking Bella. McGranger told Alice Penwill of Inside Soap that until that moment, Irene has not suspected anything is up, even when Bella makes an excuse not to attend a wedding with her. Irene sees Tommy on top of Bella and instinctively picks up a nearby vase and strikes him. Tommy pleads with the pair not to call the police, but this causes Irene to recall the abuse she suffered in her childhood. McGranger expanded on this: "So when Tommy says to Bella, 'Don't call the police, this will just be our little secret', that triggers something in Irene about her past. She picks up the nearest thing and basically bludgeons him with it!" McGranger praised the show's editors for their work on making the scenes suitable for the early evening timeslot, but leaving the audience with no doubt as to what has happened. McGranger hoped that viewers would be able to sympathise with her character's actions, as they are aware of Irene's past.

Speaking to Daniel Kilkelly of Digital Spy, McGranger explained that Bella takes charge and stops Irene from calling an ambulance. McGranger quipped, "because of Bella's past with Colby and her father, she's 16 going on 40! But Irene reverts to that terrified teenager." She also called it "a 16-year-old's wishful thinking" when Bella believes that they can forget what happened after leaving Tommy at the hospital. As the storyline progresses, the police discover Tommy's identity and Irene's guilt forces her to go to the police and confess, despite Bella's protests. As Colby learns the truth, Tamara Cullen of TV Week observed that he is "rattled by his sister's words and sad he couldn't be there to stop the attack." Bella is seen struggling after she agrees to testify in court for Irene. She attends a party thrown by Ryder and uses alcohol as a distraction. Bella faces Tommy in court during Irene's hearing and, as she gives details about her assault, an enraged Colby tries to attack him. Irene is found guilty, but she is not given a custodial sentence. Tommy is later murdered by activist Teresa Masterson (Simone McAullay).

Bella is shown to be traumatised by the events. She moves back in with Colby, but hides in her room and has to be coaxed out by Willow. An encounter with Dean frightens Bella and later leads to a nightmare about Tommy. In an interview with the Metro's Imogen Groome, Miller confirmed that Bella's life would be affected by Tommy's actions. She told Groome that Bella has "great difficulty" going back to school, as she fears everyone knows what has happened, and she finds it hard to concentrate on her work. Miller commented, "Bella just wants to be close to Colby and therefore school has become insignificant to her." Bella also becomes even more distrustful of men, something that began with her father. Miller stated "Bella has a disfigured understanding of men. She grew up with a forceful dad who she later found out was the murderer of her own mother. Although she has Colby and Dean in her life, Bella has learnt to distrust and protect herself against men. The situation with Tommy has caused Bella to distrust men even more." This leads to Bella clashing with Colby's housemate Robbo (Jake Ryan), as he confronts her about her behaviour and how it is affecting Colby.

=== Feud with Mackenzie, tetanus and overdose ===
Bella begins feuding with Mackenzie after she breaks up with Colby because of his occupation, leaving him "heartbroken". Bella is "livid" with Mackenzie and attempts to confront her, but she is stopped by Dean and Willow, who are concerned about her recent violent outbursts. After listening to a drunken Colby talking about his heartbreak, Bella takes a can of gasoline to Mackenzie's restaurant, Salt, and plans to set the place on fire, but Dean and Willow catch her in time. Bella is "staunchly unrepentant" as she explains that she wants to hurt Mackenzie for breaking up with Colby. Speaking to a New Idea writer, Miller believed that Bella intention to burn down Salt came from "a place of vulnerability". She feels that Mackenzie has broken her trust and hurt her brother, like Chelsea did before she left the Bay. Miller continued, "Bella sees Mackenzie as a threat and will go to any extreme to get revenge." Bella later catches the couple kissing when she follows Colby, and she is "anything but happy". Colby makes the situation worse when he lies to her about where he went.

The storyline leads to Bella's hospitalisation, after she falls ill and Mackenzie does not take her seriously. With Bella due to go on a school trip, Colby and Mackenzie make plans to spend the weekend together. However, when Bella claims that she is sick and not well enough to go anywhere, Colby has no choice but to cancel the plans, leading Mackenzie to accuse Bella of faking her illness. As Bella storms out of the flat, followed by Mackenzie and Colby, she collapses. After being rushed to the hospital, Doctor Alex Neilson (Zoe Ventoura) learns that Bella has not been immunised and diagnoses her with tetanus. Bella later uses her illness to manipulate Colby into spending all his time with her, but when he learns that she has been lying to him, Bella is "terrified" that she is going to lose him and takes an overdose of medication stolen from the hospital. Miller commented that "Bella doesn't think of the consequences." The 2019 season finale sees Bella and Mackenzie among several characters caught up in a siege at the hospital. Mackenzie risks her own life to try and get help for Bella when she learns what she has done, but the gunman refuse her medical help and Bella's condition deteriorates rapidly. Miller added that Bella is "terrified – and keeps asking if she's going to die."

=== Departure and return ===
The character departed during the episode broadcast on 2 June 2022, as she moves to New York for work. Jaime Robbie Reyne reprised his role of Bella's photography mentor Emmett Ellison to facilitate her departure from the Bay, as Emmett offers Bella a job. Tamara Cullen of TV Week noted that Bella had "longed for this opportunity", but it came at the expense of her relationship with Nikau Parata (Kawakawa Fox-Reo), who opted to stay in the Bay. Bella joins her family and friends for a farewell dinner, and promises that Summer Bay will always be home to her. A couple of days after Bella's exit aired, Miller took to her social media to post her appreciation of the cast and crew, adding "To the time of my life. Thank-you @homeandaway. Forever & always your Bella." Miller made a brief appearance as Bella in the episode broadcast on 21 July 2022, as Nikau breaks up with her during a video call. Rachel Choy of Yahoo! Lifestyle observed that while the storyline left viewers "unsatisfied", it meant that Bella could return to the serial in the future. After leaving Home and Away, Miller went on to study acting at the 16th Street Actors Studio in Melbourne. She told Choy that she would like to reprise her role, but not for a long stint. She thought it would be good to come back to see her former co-stars and apply her new acquired acting techniques.

Miller reprised the role in February 2023. She said returning to the set "was so much fun." Bella comes back from New York still unaware that Nikau ended their relationship because his family and friends were being threatened by a biker gang. She actually returns to the Bay to visit Dean and Ziggy's newborn daughter Izzy Thompson. She initially dismisses any concerns about running into Nikau, but when they do meet, Nikau reveals why he broke up with her, leaving Bella "dumbfounded". Of her return, Miller stated "Bella and Nikau now live in two worlds. New York is very different to the feel of Summer Bay. Nikau is taken aback by her return, as much has happened – for both of them." Bella return helped facilitate Nikau own departure from the serial, as the couple reunited and Nikau decided to move to New York to be with her. Their final scenes aired on 2 March 2023.

== Reception ==
For her portrayal of Bella, Miller received a nomination for the Logie Award for Most Popular New Talent in 2019. Jackie Brygel of New Idea thought Miller made "a memorable first impression" as a crossbow wielding Bella. Tamara Cullen of TV Week branded the character "rebellious". Simon Timblick of What's on TV called her a "troubled teenager", while a New Idea writer dubbed her "deeply troubled".

An Inside Soap columnist believed Bella was the "toughest" of the "troubled young girls" that Irene has cared for over the years, and wrote "from assaulting her brother to lashing out at her friends, Bella is trouble with a capital 'T' – and she's now revealing her personal details to someone online, with devastating consequences." Miller revealed that she had been approached by a number of parents thanking her for the grooming storyline, which led to their own children talking to them about it.

Kerry Harvey of Stuff.co.nz noted that Miller's performance as Bella and the character's "out-of-control behaviour" had "polarised viewers". A New Idea writer observed that Bella has had "a hugely traumatic year" and "has been causing no end of strife" for Colby and Mackenzie. TV Week named Bella's kidnap by Ross and her assault as two of their "biggest twists and jaw-dropping moments" of 2019. Rachel Choy of Yahoo! Lifestyle noted that Bella and Nikau's romance was "a much-loved onscreen relationship" with fans.
