= Mackenzie Booth =

- Home and Away character
- Portrayed by: Emily Weir
- Duration: 2019–present
- First appearance: 13 June 2019
- Introduced by: Lucy Addario
In-universe information
- Occupation: Restaurateur
- Father: Rick Booth
- Mother: Tanya
- Half-brothers: Dean Thompson; Sean Booth
- Half-sisters: Kayla Booth
- Nephews: Jai Simmons
- Nieces: Izzy Thompson

Mackenzie Booth is a fictional character from the Australian television soap opera Home and Away, played by Emily Weir. Weir decided to audition for the role after reading the character brief. She was attending a different audition when her agent informed her that she had won the part of Mac. Weir described the moment as overwhelming and revealed that she had been a big fan of the show since she was young. She began filming in December 2018 and her casting was publicly revealed when she was photographed filming scenes at Palm Beach. Weir made her first appearance as Mac during the episode broadcast on 13 June 2019.

The character is portrayed as an independent, smart, strong and confident woman. Weir stated that Mac comes from a privileged background and is financially independent, which she enjoys playing, as there were not many women in soaps that owned their own businesses. Mac's motivation for coming to Summer Bay was initially a mystery, before she was revealed as the new owner of local restaurant Salt. Weir had experience of working in restaurants, so the role felt familiar to her. It soon emerges that Mac is the half-sister of Dean Thompson (Patrick O'Connor) and has come to the Bay to meet him. Weir said Mac wants Dean to like her before she tells him who she is. As they get to know one another, writers reintroduced their father Rick Booth (Mark Lee), with whom Mac has a strained relationship. Away from her family issues, Mac establishes a romantic relationship with Dean's best friend Colby Thorne (Tim Franklin). Weir thought the pair had great chemistry. Mac ends the relationship when Colby due to his job as a police constable, leading to a feud with his sister Bella Nixon (Courtney Miller) who blames Mac for breaking her brother's heart. The couple briefly reconcile, until Mac grows tired of Colby prioritising work and Bella over her.

Mac was then paired with Ari Parata (Rob Kipa-Williams), who uses Salt as a base to search for a job. Mac finds Ari appealing because he seems drama-free. The pair enter into a casual relationship, which is complicated by her attraction to Ari's brother Tane Parata (Ethan Browne). Weir thought Tane was the type of man Mac would normally date, but he would being too much drama into her life. Mac and Ari eventually commit to one another, but writers broke the couple up in early 2021, following the arrival of Ari's former partner Mia Anderson (Anna Samson) and their subsequent reconciliation. Mac then learns she is pregnant, and she considers having an abortion. However, the decision is taken away from her when she has a miscarriage due to an ectopic pregnancy. Weir carried out her own research on the topic and worked closely with the show's on set nurse and doctor for the storyline. Mac experiences a downward spiral as a result of her pain and grief. She pushes her friends and family away, begins binge drinking, and has a series of one-night stands. Producers next paired the character with Logan Bennett (Harley Bonner), who Weir thought was a good match for Mac. The story arc was cut short when Bonner made a sudden departure from the show.

== Casting ==
Weir joined the cast in December 2018. Her involvement in the serial was confirmed the following year when she was photographed filming scenes at Palm Beach, the show's outdoor location. A writer for the June 2019 issue of Soap World reported that her character was named Mackenzie Booth and they speculated that she might be related to established character Dean Thompson (Patrick O'Connor), after they were seen filming together. Weir heard about the role of Mackenzie from a close friend who had received the casting. After reading the character brief, she felt that Mackenzie was her role and auditioned. Actress Jacqui Purvis also auditioned for the role, before she was cast as Felicity Newman in 2021. Weir was attending an audition for another show when her agent called to inform her that she had won the part of Mackenzie. Of her reaction, she said "I just screamed and started running around like a mad woman. It was such an overwhelming feeling; a dream come true." She later explained to Kerry Harvey of Stuff that she was a big fan of Home and Away and had grown up watching it with her family. She admitted that she had even written to the producers when she was 10 years old to ask for a role. After learning she had been cast as Mackenzie, she flew to Brisbane that same week to surprise her family with the news. Weir told Harvey that she was overwhelmed when she met her new co-stars and began filming her first scenes with them. She said, "I just couldn't keep it together. I was OK in front of them but then I went away. I had such a happy cry of joy because they are absolutely, wonderfully lovely and talented human beings. It was a real treat to meet them." Weir made her first appearance as Mackenzie on 13 June 2019.

== Development ==
=== Characterisation and introduction ===
"It's so amazing to step into the shoes of a character as three-dimensional as Mac. She's outspoken, she's blunt, wears her heart on her sleeve and doesn't suffer fools. I'm not sure if people like Mackenzie – but I do!"

— Weir talking to Inside Soap's Alice Penwill about playing Mac (2021).

Ahead of her first scenes airing, Weir called Mackenzie, or "Mac", "a very fierce and independent, smart woman." Jackie Brygel of New Idea dubbed the character "mysterious" and "fiery". Weir later described Mac as "strong, confident, witty and loving human being." She found Mac fun to play because of her background, explaining: "She comes from quite a bit of privilege, which is definitely different from me. So she sort of rocks in from out of town with a Porsche and some high heels and a bit of attitude." Weir said it was her dream to play such a character and called Mac "super-fabulous!" She also liked that Mac was financially independent, noting that there were not many women in soap operas that owned their own businesses, adding "she's a boss and she doesn't apologise for that." Weir also branded Mac "a straight-shooting boss", although she said that Mac can sometimes be "terrible and abusive, mostly she's good. Mac is either riding high, or really low..." Speaking to Sarah Ellis of Inside Soap, Weir told her that she would be friends with Mac if she were real. She did not think they would move in the same social circle, but she would be able to "appreciate her humour". Mac is a keen surfer in the show, but Weir admitted that she cannot surf in real life and body doubles were used whenever her character goes surfing.

Weir said the audience is initially unaware of her character's motivation for coming to Summer Bay, saying "there is quite an element of mystery there." Mac is then introduced as the new owner of the restaurant Salt. Weir had previously worked in restaurants prior to her acting career, and she found it was "really great" to be playing an owner of one, as it was "a familiar space" to her. Brygel (New Idea) noted that buying the restaurant does not seem like Mac's only reason for moving to the Bay. Weir later said that Mac buys Salt as she feels that it is a good investment, but her real motivation is to track down her long-lost half-brother, Dean Thompson (Patrick O'Connor). Mac initially approaches Dean to ask about surfing lessons. She later asks him several personal questions and he realises that he is being "grilled" by her. When Dean learns that Mac has befriended Colby Thorne (Tim Franklin), he attempts to tell her that Colby is not ready to date, but she counters that she is not interested in Colby, but rather him. Mac then reveals that she is Dean's half-sister, and that her mother was their father, Rick Booth's (Mark Lee) first wife. Dean is shocked and angered by the revelation. Weir stated that Mac wanted Dean to like her before she told him the news, as she was unsure how he would react.

Mac is later shown rejecting a phone call from her father, hinting at a bad relationship between them. Weir told Ellis (Inside Soap) that Mac and Rick's relationship is "very strained, to say the least! There's a lot of distance between them, and the relationship is filled with pain. But she is absolutely genuine about getting to know Dean better and building a relationship with him." Weir admitted that she personally connected with Mac's "tested relationship" with her father. Writers soon reintroduced Rick, as he comes to the Bay to confront Mac and Dean. Ahead of this, Mac is left "fuming" after learning about her father's new political career in the press. Dean attempts to calm her down by asking her about her revenge plan for Rick. Mac assures him that she is leaving him out of it, but viewers then learn Mac is blackmailing her father for $100,000 to keep quiet about Dean. This threat brings Rick to the Bay, where he meets with Dean. O'Conner commented "Dean doesn't want to be involved in this, but fans will see different shades of him as the storyline plays out." An angered Dean "blasts" Mac for involving him in her blackmail plan, before Rick turns up to do the same. Weir later called for the introduction of Mac's other siblings and her mother. She wanted the chance to explore her character's relationship with her parents, as Mac often mentions that she is close to her mother.

=== Relationship with Colby Thorne ===
The character was immediately paired with Dean's best friend Colby (Franklin). The pair initially clash, leading Weir to explain "There's been a war of wit and words between Mackenzie and Colby from the moment they met. On the surface, it seems that they really don't like each other, but yet they're clearly intrigued and there's an intellectual battle going on between them." Weir later said that Mac fancies Colby and they initially share "a great dynamic", but it would become "a difficult endeavour" for them. Of their connection, Weir commented "It's a battle of wits, it's fun, and there's great chemistry between them." The pair share a kiss after bonding over their complicated families, but Mac pulls away and explains that she cannot get involved with him while he is still wearing his wedding ring. Weir explained that for her character it was "a strict moral thing" that she will not excuse. Even though she knows he is separated from his wife, Weir said Mac needs the ring to be gone so that she sees Colby as a single man. After Colby removes his ring, Mack invites him over to her place for a date. They are soon interrupted by Dean calling Colby for some advice. Mac encourages Colby to lie and tell Dean that he is busy at work. Franklin commented that the situation was "very complicated", but Colby wants to establish a connection with Mac before getting Dean involved. However, Dean then shows up at Mac's house and walks in on Mac and Colby together.

Mac later ends the relationship due to Colby's occupation. As Colby becomes preoccupied with investigating a dangerous gang and is constantly called out to various situations, Mac realises how much his job is affecting her. She tells Dean that she is having doubts about the relationship, and when she sees Colby in a "confronting" situation, she breaks up with him. This leads to a feud between Mac and Colby's sister Bella Nixon (Courtney Miller), who is "livid" at seeing her brother "heartbroken" by the break up. Bella makes an attempt at confronting Mac, before Dean and Willow Harris (Sarah Roberts) stop her from starting a fire at Salt. Miller explained that Bella feels like Mac has broken her trust and hurt her brother, like his former wife did. She continued: "Bella sees Mackenzie as a threat and will go to any extreme to get revenge." Colby and Mac resume their romance, after arranging "a secret rendezvous" and Bella later sees them kissing. Later scenes see the couple plan a getaway to improve their relationship, but Colby is forced to cancel when Bella claims she is ill. Mac is "naturally upset" and accuses Bella of putting on an act, however, Bella soon collapses and is hospitalised with tetanus. This causes visible tension between Mac and Colby, as he pushes her away to care for Bella.

The storyline comes to a head during the final episodes of 2019. After Colby learns Bella has been using her illness to manipulate him, she takes an overdose. Mac finds her in "a bad way" and takes her to the hospital, where they join several other characters caught up in a siege by armed gunman. The pair initially hide in a small side room, where Bella admits that she has taken a lot of pills. Mac then risks her own life to try and get help for Bella. Weir explained "She springs to action and risks her life. If she does nothing, Bella could die." Both women are found by the gunmen and forced to join the other hostages. Bella is refused medical help and she deteriorates rapidly, but is eventually treated. Following the siege, Mac's relationship with Colby comes to an end, as Mac grows frustrated with him. Weir told Tamara Cullen and Gabrielle Tozer of TV Week: "Mac felt Colby didn't prioritise her in his life. He didn't have time for her. Granted, he had a lot going on with Bella and with his police work, but she's tired of coming second." Colby makes an attempt to win Mac back, but she starts to move on as she feels their romance is over. Weir said the characters have "a strong connection", but Mac realises an on/off relationship is bad for her self-esteem and she decides to put herself first.

=== Relationship with Ari Parata ===
Producers then paired Mac with Ari Parata (Rob Kipa-Williams), who was introduced during the siege storyline. The characters begin to interact regularly when Ari uses Salt as a base to search the newspapers for a job. Mac becomes "a shoulder to lean on", as Ari struggles to find some work. She also finds him intriguing when he is unwilling to open up about himself. Speaking to Cullen and Tozer, Weir stated "Ari appeals because he seems drama-free. He's relaxed and easy and she finds him attractive. She's craving simplicity and wants to avoid 'complicated'. Ari seems someone who's calm and relaxed with himself." When Dean learns Mac has befriended his former prison mate, he warns Ari off and tries to persuade his sister to give Colby a second chance. When Ari does not come to Salt like usual, Mac visits him at the caravan park, where her "blunt approach" encourages Ari to open up. Weir said her character does not judge someone for having "a complicated past", since she also has one. After spending days flirting, the pair spend the night together in Ari's caravan. Cullen observed that the fun and carefree nature of a casual relationship is just what Mac needs, after Colby. Weir told her that Mac has no regrets and enjoys the freedom of having sex with Ari. She continued: "It makes her feel like she's found her swagger again and she enjoys the breath of fresh air."

"She comes from a broken home where cheating, lying and scheming was really prevalent, and she tries to live her life in an honest way. Temptation was very high, but I think morally she couldn't cross the line by actually acting on it. She'd be too honest before she did something like that."

— Weir on the temptation faced by Mac during the love triangle story with Tane.

Writers introduced a love triangle element to the storyline when Mac develops an attraction to Ari's brother Tane Parata (Ethan Browne). Mac initially ignores her feelings for Tane, but she is forced to deal with the issue when she gets into a fight with his love interest Amber Simmons (Maddy Jevic). Weir told Inside Soap's Sarah Ellis that seeing Tane and Amber together causes Mac to become jealous. She questions why she cares so much and realises that she really likes Tane, leaving her with a dilemma. When asked why Mac is attracted to Tane, Weir replied "Tane has a cheeky bravado, and the gift of the gab. He flirts, he's suave, and I think that's Mac's usual type – add to that he's totally gorgeous! So it's maybe a case of what she's normally attracted to versus what she needs." Knowing that her fight with Amber will probably get back to Ari, Mac tells him how she feels about his brother. Weir stressed that her character would never cheat on Ari, as she is "very moral", but with him noticing the tension between herself and Tane, Mac cannot lie to him. Weir told Ellis that being honest with Ari was the right thing to do and Mac would accept the consequences. She also told Ellis that "Mackenzie quickly realises that she's been a bit self-destructive, out of fear of opening up her heart to Ari. This whole thing makes her realise she has serious feelings for him, and that she wants to consider the possibility of a future with him." Weir had fun filming the storyline and thought it was a great idea.

Speaking to Daniel Kilkelly of Digital Spy, Weir said Ari's energy keeps Mac feeling grounded, protected and relaxed, especially as she gets quite stressed. Reiterating that Tane is the type of man her character would normally date, Weir also said that Mac's feelings for him started off as "a surface level attraction", but she finds that he has other traits that are "very desirable" to her. She explained "Initially because Mackenzie wasn't in a full committed relationship to Ari, it did make her feel not as guilty than if she were in a fully-fledged committed relationship with him." When asked which Parata brother was best for Mac, Weir found it a tough choice and thought that Ari was the "better match" for her. She explained to Kilkelly that Ari would prioritises her, while Tane would likely bring too much drama into her life. Weir also thought that "morally" Mac came close to giving into her feelings for Tane, but she is not the type of person to do that having experienced it in her past. Mac and Ari decide to pursue a committed relationship. Weir commented that Mac devotes herself to Ari and falls harder for him, while Tane is no longer on her mind. Mac later joins the brothers as they search for Bella and Nikau Parata (Kawakawa Fox-Reo) in scenes filmed in the Blue Mountains. Weir said Mac is the practical one of the group and tries to keep everyone focused. She is also pleased when Ari and Tane try to put their differences aside.

Weir admitted that love triangle storylines were "fascinating" as an actress to play out, as they involved multiple layers and complexity. After Tane admits that he is struggling to be himself around Mac while she is living with the Paratas, he gives her an ultimatum – either he goes or she does. Mac decides to move in with Ziggy Astoni (Sophie Dillman), just as Ari asks her to move in with him permanently. When she asks for time to think, Ari questions whether she is as committed to their relationship as he is, leading Weir to joke "Ari has always appealed to Mac because he seems drama-free. She's craving simplicity and wanted to avoid complicated!" Writers split the couple up in early 2021, following the introduction of Ari's former partner Mia Anderson (Anna Samson) and stepdaughter Chloe Anderson (Sam Barrett). Kipa-Williams admitted that he had mixed emotions about the storyline, as he felt Ari and Mac would be together forever and compared them to married couple Ben Astoni (Rohan Nichol) and Maggie Astoni (Kestie Morassi). He also said that he and Weir had formed a bond from working together for so long. On-screen, Mac tries to support Ari when it becomes clear that he and Mia have unresolved issues, but she later sees them sharing "a charged moment". Kipa-Williams said Ari wants to do right by both women, but warned "The events that are about to transpire will be heartbreaking." He added that although Mac is hurt, there would be always be a chance for them to reconcile.

=== Ectopic pregnancy and downward spiral ===
Following the end of Ari and Mac's relationship, writers scripted a pregnancy for the character. Weir described her character's feelings about the pregnancy to TV Week's Stephen Downie: "After the break-up, Mac is heartbroken. And, on top of that, she finds out she's pregnant to a man who has feelings for someone else. She feels completely confused, lost and alone." Mac is shown struggling with her decision to keep the pregnancy a secret from Ari and whether she will have an abortion. When she does go to talk with Ari, he is involved in a hit-and-run. While he recovers, Mac discusses her situation with Ziggy. Weir told Downie that Mac takes on board Ziggy's advice, but she still struggles with a definite decision. She states that she does not want to keep the baby, but Weir reckoned that "she really isn't ever 100 per cent on what to do." The decision is seemingly taken out of her hands when she collapses at home. Weir said Mac is in "extreme pain" and thinks she might die alone. After being found, Mac is diagnosed with an ectopic pregnancy, causing a fallopian tube to rupture. She undergoes surgery, but loses the baby.

In an interview with Kilkelly (Digital Spy), Weir explained that she was approached by the show's producers who told her that they were plotting the storyline. She then worked with the on set nurse and doctor to help convey Mac's pain. She also carried out her own research into ectopic pregnancies and how they can be life-threatening. She stated "We really wanted to do it justice. There were many acting meetings and medical meetings that we implemented to make sure it was as real as possible." Weir told Kilkelly that the crew did not want to misrepresent anything and they needed to know what they were doing. She used the moment that Mac's fallopian tube snaps as an example, saying that she had to understand what her character's body would be going through, so she did not "overplay or underplay it." Weir "felt very privileged" by the chance to bring attention to an important issue, but she was also nervous and reiterated that she wanted to do it justice. During filming, Weir found she became "much more emotionally connected" to the story than she thought she would, and she was able to play out her character's grief with more ease.

When asked if Mac's decision to have an abortion affects how she is feeling about the miscarriage, Weir replied "It is a complicated situation because even though you see that Mac books in an appointment to get a termination, she didn't have the termination. It was, in the end, decided for her. Until the moment arises where she's getting a termination, everything is still up in the air and I think that's how she feels." Weir believed that Mac would have changed her mind about having a termination. Mac keeps the miscarriage from Ari, and Weir said Mac wants to retain her independence and prove that she does not need him. However, Mia discovers what happened after seeing Mac at the hospital, which Weir said was "difficult" for Mac, but she also said that there is "a good moment" between them in which Mac asks Mia not to tell Ari and she agrees. She told Kilkelly that Mia has also experienced a number of miscarriages, so she knows what Mac has been through and gives her "a lot of empathy and understands." She called it an "interesting moment" and liked that it was played out between two women.

Weir confirmed that Mac would experience a downward spiral because of "a pile-on of grief". As she "self-destructs", her relationships with her family and friends would suffer as she pushes them away due to the pain. When Mac returns home from the hospital, she breaks down and Ziggy finds her crying at the kitchen table. Weir described her as being "completely burnt out and overwhelmed" due to all the physical and emotional pain she is in. In the scenes between the pair, Mac details how she has lost everything, including her relationship and baby. The following morning, Mac returns to work, which Weir said was Mac's way of distracting herself from everything that has happened and a way for her to feel better. However, Ari and Mia come to Salt and Mac does not want to deal with them. Weir commented that being in the same room as Ari was very painful for her character. Mac later suffers cramps and ends up collapsing again. At the hospital, she is informed that her body has not had enough rest and being on her feet all day has affected the healing and caused a complication. Ari visits Mac, having seen her collapse, and she breaks down in his arms.

Mac soon starts binge drinking in an attempt to numb her pain and she ends up alienating her friends. The show's producers were unaware that Weir had previously had her own issues with alcohol and had been sober for a number of years. They offered to change the storyline, but Weir refused because she knew she could use her experience to tell it right. Following an afternoon of drinking, Mac jeopardises her friendship with Ziggy by kissing and propositions Tane. Weir told TV Week's Downie: "Mac is seeking validation of being desired. Ari leaving her made her feel completely unloveable – and she knows Tane has always had a soft spot for her. So, to distract herself – and seek revenge on her ex, Ari – she acts out while drunk." Weir believed that Mac has no regrets at first, as admitting to being in the wrong would force her to examine her behaviour. Weir did not think Mac was "ready to confront herself." Mac has a series of one-night stands, verbally attacks her friends, and clashes with her former employees Ryder Jackson (Lukas Radovich) and Chloe Anderson (Sam Barrett) when they park their food truck outside Salt. Weir reiterated that Mac is not ready to admit that she needs help, and commented that she is in so much pain running away and self-destructing is her way of coping.

=== Relationship with Logan Bennett ===
Following Logan Bennett's (Harley Bonner) introduction in August 2021, viewers noticed there was a suggestion of a romance between him and Mac. Weir teased that it was "suggestive for a reason" and described their connection as "fun so far". She found Bonner refreshing to work with, and thought his character was good for Mac too, saying "there's a lot of banter and intelligent wit between them." After Mac flirts with Logan at the beach, she tries to find out more about him when he comes into Salt. She learns that he was part of the Australian Defence Force and stationed in Afghanistan. However, when she tries to learn more, Logan changes the subject to get to know her a bit more. Bonner commented "Logan has always been a bit of a nomad, but he's interested in what Summer Bay has to offer. Mackenzie may or may not be a factor in Logan's decision as to whether he'll stay." As the characters spend more time together, it becomes apparent that Mac likes Logan. Weir told Penwill (Inside Soap) that Mac is "terrified" at the same time though, as she recalls the trauma she went through with Ari and her miscarriage. Weir thought Mac would be scared to open up and be vulnerable again. She found that Logan was able to provide the intellectual battle or "fight flirting" that Mc enjoys so much.

Mac and Logan spend weeks flirting. Dean notices there is something between them and tells Mac that she deserves a chance at happiness. After initially turning down a date with Logan, Mac finds him at Salt waiting for her and she eventually agrees to have a drink with him. After "plenty of flirty banter", they go back to Mac's place, but Logan is reluctant to open up about his life and makes a sudden exit. The following morning, the pair meet at the beach and Mac "dives into Logan" and they share a passionate kiss. After spending the day texting one another, they meet up and have sex. Not long after Logan agrees to move in with Mac, producers introduced his former girlfriend Neve Spicer (Sophie Bloom). Weir described Neve's arrival as "confronting" for Mac after all the drama with Ari and Mia. She continued saying that Mac is in love with Logan, and tries to be rational about the situation, but she is breaking inside. Mac feels threatened by Neve's presence because she and Logan worked together as medics in the army. Weir admitted to being surprised by Mac's decision to ask Neve to move in with her Logan, explaining "I thought it was Mackenzie being cool, but she's trying to understand her threat – better the devil you know and all that." As Neve's story plays out, Weir said Mac empathises with Neve when she realises she is suffering from PTSD.

Weir backed the couple as their relationship comes under strain by Logan prioritising Neve over Mac. She also welcomed the exploration of Logan's background, saying "Because of Logan's background, he's super closed off about it. Rightly so, Mac respects that, but you want to know the past of the person you're sleeping next to at night. I think it was a really good opportunity for Mac to understand fully what Logan has been through. That's an intimate thing to know about someone and Mac was pretty keen to learn more about him." Dean is also involved in the plot as he grows angry about the way Logan is treating Mac and ends up punching the doctor. This leads Logan to rectify things with Mac while also continuing to help Neve with her issues. In early January 2022, it was announced that Bonner had departed Home and Away and would not be returning to set when filming resumed. Bonner's sudden departure resulted in an "abrupt" exit for his character, which aired on 6 June 2022. Having broken up with Mac, after learning that she has held a number of illegal poker nights at Salt, Logan decides to re-join the Army Medical Corps and leaves without saying goodbye. Mac later listens to a voicemail from Logan, who apologises for not telling her that he was leaving. He also tells her that she is "amazing" and to be happy.

== Reception ==
For her portrayal of Mac, Weir received a nomination for Best Daytime Star at the 2021 Inside Soap Awards. She received a nomination in the same category the following year. In 2025, Weir received a nomination in the "Soaps - Best Actor" category at the Digital Spy Reader Awards. The following year, Weir was longlisted for Best Actress at the Inside Soap Awards, while "Mackenzie and Levi's fertility journey" was nominated for Best Storyline.

Kerry Harvey of Stuff observed that Mac and Colby were "considered one of the show's hottest couples." Of Mac's love triangle dilemma, Rachel Lucas of What to Watch stated "Home and Away's Mackenzie Booth is usually super straight-laced but somehow she's ended up in an awkward love triangle... With two of the hottest hunks in Summer Bay!" Lucas quipped that Mac was "self-assured" in business, but not in her love life, adding that she had a "tricky relationship" with Colby and has "stumbled straight into more drama!"

Stephanie McKenna of The West Australian enjoyed the chemistry between Mac and Tane and expressed her anger that the kiss between them was a dream sequence, writing "That kiss between Mac and Tane — the guy who is not her boyfriend — was all a lie and I fell for it. Don't get me wrong, I like Mac and Ari together, but this is a drama after all and that advertisement Home and Away have been spruiking for a week showed some serious chemistry and we were ripped off." McKenna admitted to being "extremely shocked" by the kiss because she thought it was "hot" for the show.

McKenna later called Mac "probably the smartest person in Summer Bay". She also pointed out that everyone saw Mac and Ari's break-up coming following Mia's arrival, but added that "it cuts real deep and it's another heartbreak for Home and Away.

McKenna did not think Mac was a convincing drunk, writing "It's like Mac is 15 and getting absolutely smashed on whatever she could find in her parents' stash. Mac is supposed to be this cashed up posh character who owns a bar so she should be drinking something actually nice instead of some indistinguishable rum, or maybe tequila." McKenna disliked Mac's attempt at propositioning Tane while drunk, calling it "quite frankly humiliating". As Mac's downward spiral played out, Weir's co-stars Georgie Parker, Patrick O'Connor, and Sam Frost praised her portrayal of the character. A writer from Maxim praised Weir stating that she is "captivating" and became a "Home and Away staple". They added that Mackenzie is "as vital to the show as Alf or shirtless gronks flexing on the beach."
