= Emily Weir =

Australian actress

- Born: 1990 or 1991 (age 35–36); Brisbane, Queensland, Australia
- Education: Queensland University of Technology
- Occupation: Actress
- Years active: 2003, 2017–present
- Employer: Seven Network
- Known for: Home and Away

Emily Weir is an Australian actress best known for playing Mackenzie Booth on Home and Away since 2019.

== Early life ==
Emily Weir was born and raised in Brisbane, Queensland, Australia and attended the Queensland University of Technology. She has one brother, Tom. She was a dancer for over 15 years and also took up piano and singing lessons, before deciding to pursue a career in acting.

== Career ==
Weir's first acting role was in the stage production Tartuffe, playing Dorine, the maid. For this role, she went on to win both Best Emerging Artist and Best Supporting Actress at the 2017 Matilda Awards, which recognise achievement in the performing arts industry in Queensland.

In 2019, it was announced that Weir would be joining the cast of the Australian soap opera series Home and Away on the Seven Network, after landing the role of new character Mackenzie Booth. She made her debut on the show on 13 June 2019.

In May 2023, Weir was announced as a contestant for the twentieth season of Dancing with the Stars Australia. She was partnered with Lyu Masuda. On 23 July 2023, the season wrapped and Weir was announced as the runner-up, behind winner Phil Burton.

== Personal life ==
Weir has previously spoken openly about her struggles with crippling anxiety which led to an alcohol addiction. In 2020, she revealed that she had completely given up alcohol.

== Filmography ==
Year	Title	Role	Notes
2023	Dancing with the Stars	Self	7 episodes
2023	63rd Annual Logie Awards	Self	TV Special
202?	Pearly Gates	Kate	Short
2023	Over It	Partygoer	Music Video
2022	This Is Your LIfe: Ray Meagher	Self	TV special 1 episode
2022	Carols in the Domain	Self	TV Special
2022	62nd TV Week Logies	Self	TV Special
2019	Home And Away: Christmas in Summer Bay	Self	2 episodes
2019–present	Home and Away	Mackenzie Booth	Series Regular (1000+ episodes)
2003	Sleepover Club	Emily	1 episode
