= Dean Thompson (Home and Away) =

Fictional character from the Australian television soap opera Home and Away

- Home and Away character
- Portrayed by: Patrick O'Connor
- Duration: 2018–2023, 2025
- First appearance: 1 February 2018
- Last appearance: 19 March 2025
- Introduced by: Lucy Addario
In-universe information
- Occupation: Summer Bay Auto assistant; Surf board shop assistant and owner; Waiter; Surfing instructor
- Father: Rick Booth
- Mother: Karen Thompson
- Half-brothers: Sean Booth
- Half-sisters: Kayla Booth; Mackenzie Booth
- Sons: Jai Simmons
- Daughters: Izzy Astoni-Thompson; Daniella Thompson

Dean Thompson is a fictional character from the Australian television soap opera Home and Away, played by Patrick O'Connor. The character made his first screen appearance on 1 February 2018. The character was introduced as one of Home and Away's new River Boys, who are a fictional criminal gang that reside in Mangrove River. The show had previously included actors playing the River Boys in their regular cast, most notably the Braxton brothers. They became popular with viewers and were led by actor Steve Peacocke as Darryl Braxton. When O'Connor joined the show he felt pressured to live up to the "legacy" Peacocke had created on the show. He watched old episodes and researched the role with two former cast members who played River Boys.

Dean is characterised as "extremely loyal" and "protective" of his family and friends. He likes to try to be "the top dog" of his gang. Dean's affiliation with the River Boys meant that writers could develop crime stories for the character. He was given immediate links to other characters, such as his friend Ash (George Mason) and his ex-girlfriend Willow Harris (Sarah Roberts). The show also introduced a fellow River Boy, Colby Thorne (Tim Franklin) who left the gang to join the police force. Their troubled past and friendship is prominently featured in Dean's story. Writers paired Dean with Willow and her gambling addiction leads Dean into committing credit card fraud and robberies and leaving him in debt to a loan shark. To explore his backstory producers introduced Dean's family, which included his troubled mother Karen Thompson (Georgia Adamson), his long-lost father Rick Booth (Mark Lee) and a half-sister Kayla Booth (Audrey Blyde). The character departed on 9 March 2023, following O'Connor's decision to leave the serial. He reprised the role in March 2025 for a storyline set and filmed in Queensland.

== Casting ==
The character and O'Connor's casting were announced on 13 January 2018. The actor began filming his first scenes five months prior to the announcement. He had previously auditioned for other characters, and came close to securing the roles, before being cast as Dean. This is O'Connor's first acting role. Of joining the show, he stated "Home and Away is obviously known as a launch pad for many actors’ careers. Obviously going into the type of role that this is, being a River Boy and there being a story there already that is so big and well known, it means there is a legacy there to play around with and being a bad boy on the show is exciting." The character's appearance was first teased in a trailer showcasing some of the upcoming 2018 storylines. Dean made his first appearance on 1 February 2018.

== Development ==
=== Characterisation ===
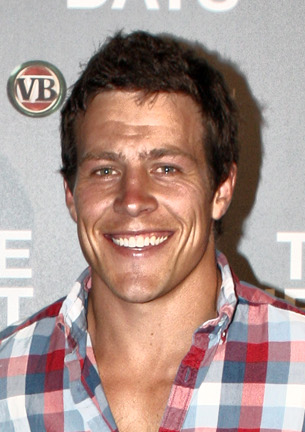
Patrick O'Connor wanted Dean to be different from River Boy Brax, who was played by actor Steve Peacocke (pictured).

Dean is a member of the show's River Boys group, who were introduced in 2011 with the arrival of the Braxton brothers. Dean was branded "the new bad boy of Summer Bay" by Jonathon Moran of The Daily Telegraph. O'Connor told a reporter from New Idea that playing a "bad boy on Home And Away is something a lot of actors want to do." He added that it allowed him to have fun with the drama the character creates. While O'Connor described him as "cheeky" and said that he loves AFL. The actor added that he likes that his character has tattoos, as he has always wanted one. O'Connor felt honoured to play a River Boy because he believed their backstory and role in Home and Away to be iconic. He told a 7plus reporter that "the role of a River Boy is appealing to me because of the rebellious nature of the character. As a teenager I’d always wanted to test the boundaries and I feel as though I can do that within the role of Dean."

The actor believed that Dean is "ambitious" and finds joy in being "the top dog". Dean has fought hard for anything he had in life and this shows during interactions with other characters. O'Connor also stated that the character "cares deeply about the people he loves, he’s fiercely loyal and he can become very protective of them." O'Connor described Dean as being "extremely loyal" and "quite protective" of friends and family, but criticised Dean's bad persona stating "the way he goes about things in life, I would never go down that path."

The original incarnation of the River Boys proved to be successful with viewers. Introducing more characters linked to them added pressure because of high expectations from fans. The original leader of the River Boys was Brax (Steve Peacocke). O'Connor was nervous about playing the new leader because he believed that Peacocke created "such a legacy" with his character. He tried to make an effort to play Dean as a River Boy that is different to Brax. O'Connor told a reporter from TV Week that "I want to be different and make this role my own, but at the same time, keep in touch with what it is to be a River Boy." To prepare for his portrayal of Dean, O'Connor watched old episodes of Home and Away that feature the river boys. He also met with Lincoln Younes and Nic Westaway, who played Casey and Kyle Braxton respectively who offered him advice.

O'Connor believed that viewers came to like the character because they know Dean's actions come from a place of "love and protection". He told Sarah Ellis from Inside Soap that "although Dean is a smartass with a bit of attitude, he's still a little boy inside just wanting to find his place in the bay." The actor claimed that Dean's story had resonated with fans so well they would even approach him to offer their advice regarding the character's bad behaviour.

=== Introduction ===
Home and Away's publicity team released a trailer to create hype for the character's arrival in the show. Dean arrives in Summer Bay to help out Ash. He contacts Dean to help him track down and attack Robbo (Jake Ryan) who he believes is responsible for the death of Kat Chapman (Pia Miller). Dean and Willow's past is complicated and they used to date each other. Dean causes trouble for Willow and her boyfriend Justin Morgan (James Stewart) by sneaking into her caravan. The incident leads Justin to accuse Willow of sleeping with Dean. But she makes it clear to Justin that she is not interested in Dean.

Writers also included a link to fellow new character Colby Thorne (Tim Franklin), a police officer who was once a member of the River Boy gang. He and Dean were best friends and Dean agrees to keep their past a secret, but this causes tension between them. A Home and Away public relations worker stated that the two characters became estranged following a failed car robbery. Colby asked Dean to steal a car and let him take sole blame when he was caught. During an episode in which Colby tries to make amends for the botched robbery they end up in a fight. Dean collapses and is rushed to hospital where Mason Morgan (Orpheus Pledger) succeeds in saving his life.

When Justin's daughter Ava Gilbert (Grace Thomas) is kidnapped by the Easton family, Dean helps Colby. When Dean attacks Boyd Easton (Steve Le Marquand), he tries to run over Dean. To protect his friend Colby shoots and kills Boyd. The incident helps them salvage their friendship and their secret remains hidden. Boyd's sister Ebony Harding (Cariba Heine) discovers their connection and informs the local news paper leading to Colby losing his job.

=== Willow and debts ===
"Willow and Dean are both from backgrounds where the way to acquire things is by doing it yourself – legal or not, being part of a gang, Dean has been taught to recognise an opportunity and grab it, regardless of the law."

— O'Connor on Dean and Willow's dynamic. (2018)

Willow breaks-up with Justin and seduces Dean.Home and Away writers then romantically paired Dean with her instead. The character's relationship soon becomes difficult as Willow still loves Justin. Roberts believed that her character initially intended to use Dean to move on from Justin. She added Willow is not really interested in a serious relationship but "Dean talks her round". Dean later torments Justin over their relationship which leads to Justin punching Dean. Dean struggles to find a new job and she is forced to cover both of their rent to stay at the caravan park. Willow resorts to stealing from the gym in which she works to pay their rent. Willow also has a gambling addiction which begins to rule her life. She down plays her addiction but Dean is not fooled by her lies. Roberts said that "Dean knows her so well and can usually help her when things go wrong, but this time, it seems she's in too deep." Willow and Dean begin squatting in Colby's apartment and Dean borrows money from a loan shark. He realises that they cannot repay the money and he conjures up a plan to skim credit cards. He tampers with the card payment machine inside the local restaurant Salt. When they exit the building, they knock Alf Stewart (Ray Meagher) to the ground and leave him unconscious. Writers continued to heighten the danger surrounding Dean when he is beaten up by his loan shark. Dean and Willow worry when Irene Roberts (Lynne McGranger) becomes the first victim of their card skimming.

Dean ends their relationship because be believes that she will not overcome her gambling addiction if they remain together. Willow is upset and Dean also does it to protect her from getting hurt by his loan shark, Brett (Graeme McRae). Roberts told a TV Week reporter that "they're not good for each other, but she can't get out of the rabbit hole, as long as they're together, they'll keep losing themselves and end up in risky situations." She also believed that Dean and Willow are "not good for each other". The actress told Sarah Ellis (Inside Soap) that they had a "whirlwind relationship" and that viewers "love their history" but it would have been worrying had they remained together.

Dean tries to repay his debt but his loan shark Brett demands payment. Dean explains that he cannot pay but offers to get involved with Brett's criminal activities to clear the debt. Brett agrees and orders Dean to look after a backpack filled with cash and drop it off to an associate. O'Connor told a TV Week columnist that "there's a very high chance Dean could end up in jail if things turn sour." Brett tells Dean that he must help commit a robbery at Salt to clear his debt. Dean is unwilling to rob from Brody Morgan (Jackson Heywood) and asks Colby for help. He suggests they inform the police and set a trap to have Brett arrested. Working with the police is forbidden within the River Boys gang. O'Connor told Maddison Hockey (TV Week) that Dean is "so loyal to his River Boys" but knows he must make an exception and participate with the police sting to keep himself and Willow safe. Brody and his wife Ziggy Astoni (Sophie Dillman) are still inside Salt when the robbery takes place. They are forced to hide in a storeroom and let the robbery happen. Dillman told Nikki Black from New Idea that the plot was "such a shock and so frightening for Ziggy and Brody." O'Connor said his character protects Ziggy and Brody from coming to any harm from Brett. The actors enjoyed creating the scenes. O'Connor told Black "they were so much fun, it was like playing cops and robbers."

Willow is arrested for assaulting Alf and credit card fraud at Salt. Dean decides to confess to sole involvement in both crimes so that Willow is released. Dean is released on bail until the case goes to court. He realises he has ruined his life and wants to leave Summer Bay. Roberts believed that Willow had caused all of Dean's misfortune and he did not deserve a prison sentence. Her character "desperately" wants change everything and asks Justin to help Dean. Writers began further development on the friendship between Dean and Ziggy. When the pair get drunk together, an angry Brody accuses Dean of purposely getting his wife drunk. Dillman said that "poor Dean always seems to get in trouble and get the blame for everything." Dean is given community service as a result of his court case.

=== Family issues ===
Producers hired Georgia Adamson to play Dean's estranged mother Karen Thompson to explore Dean's backstory. Her introduction into the series was linked with Dean's court case, he makes contact with her to inform her of the trial and she ignores him. The actor told Inside Soap's Ellis that Dean wants Karen back in his life because he feels she is the only person that he can be honest with. Karen has mental health issues and drink and drug problems. She has a history of violence and had been an unstable influence on Dean during his childhood. Karen arrives in Summer Bay when Dean is trying to keep busy with his community service. O'Connor told Jackie Brygel from New Idea that "I think he does want to get back on the straight and narrow. But now his mum turns up." Willow and Colby are unhappy with Karen's arrival. Colby remembers Karen's "terrible mood swings" and Willow reveals that Karen once threatened Dean with a knife which resulted in him ceasing contact with her.

Karen causes trouble for Dean when she clashes with John Palmer (Shane Withington) over Dean's community service. Angered by the confrontation she tries to run John over but instead crashes the vehicle causing herself harm. O'Connor told TV Week's Tamara Cullen that "after the crash, he realises that her being in the Bay in her current state will only cause more drama, his persistent requests for her to get help makes Karen become defensive." John reports Karen to the police and Colby tries to convince Dean to have his mother sectioned to avoid charges. Dean signs the commitment papers which prompts Karen to run away. When Karen returns Dean tries to convince her to seek help once again. She behaves erratic and hits Dean over the head with a frying pan, knocking him unconscious. Karen then turns the gas on and they both spend an entire night passed out and exposed to toxic fumes. The following morning Willow and Chelsea Campbell (Ashleigh Brewer) save both Dean and Karen, following this she is detained in a mental health facility.

Writers soon explored Dean's paternal family via Karen's secret past. On-screen Dean and Colby find a hidden suitcase belonging to Karen. Inside they find out that Karen knew who Dean's biological father was and had lied to him. O'Connor told a reporter from New Idea that Dean never knew the identity of his father because Karen kept it a secret following a deal she had made with the man. Dean accepted that he would never know his biological father. The actor believed that his an absent father had taught Dean to be independent from a young age. Finding out that he can find his father upsets him and O'Connor added that "he's quite anxious about the prospect that he could learn about his father now, it brings up an old wound of growing up without a father." Dean discovers his father is a wealthy man named Rick Booth (Mark Lee) and visits him. Rick explains that Karen only told him about Dean following his birth. Rick had already had a child with another woman at this point and purchased Karen a house so she would keep away. Dean also discovers that he has a half-sister Kayla Booth (Audrey Blyde) and soon realises that Rick is not interested in getting to know him.

=== Departure and return ===
The character's departure aired on 9 March 2023, after O'Connor decided to leave Home and Away. He thanked the show's crew and fans on his social media, writing "Well my friends my time as a river boy has come to an end. To @louise.bowes the woman who made it all possible, what a character you made. A boy from a broken family, now a man off on [a] new adventure of raising his own. Thank you for inducting me into the Blood & Sand." He praised the fans for making his time on Home and Away "unforgettable".

On 13 October 2024, Jade Brown of Digital Spy confirmed O'Connor would be reprising his role, along with Dillman for a storyline airing in 2025. No details were given about the plot, but Brown reported that it would be filmed on-location in the Whitsunday Region during late October. Of his return to Home and Away, O'Connor commented "I can't wait for the action, and for fans to see this storyline play out." Dean and Ziggy's return aired from 10 to 19 March 2025. The storyline was set and filmed in Queensland, and featured Dean's sister Mackenzie Booth (Emily Weir) visiting the couple with her new partner Levi Fowler (Tristan Gorey).

== Reception ==
A TV Week reporter believed that Dean had "remarkably similar traits" to the original River Boy leader Brax. While Maddison Hockey said that TV Week staff had been eagerly anticipating Dean's arrival ever since Home and Away released the first teaser trailer featuring him. Abi Moustafa from Who magazine said that Dean's introduction into the show was a "new and interesting storyline". Michael Darling from Soaplife said that "Justin may have not wiped the smile off Dean's face, but the news he's being played for a fool will." His colleague Claire Crick opined that "Dean Thompson hasn't made a lot of friends since arriving in Summer Bay." Penelope Baker from Soap World said that "hottie Patrick O'Connor has had us enthralled for months as the scheming Dean Thompson, Summer Bay's new favourite bad boy." Fellow Soap World writer John Burfitt said "this man is never afraid of a fight and doesn't care who it's with – as long as he gets his own way." They added that Dean and Willow's story took a "wild turn". Seth Adamson from TV Soap said that Dean and Colby were the next generation of the River Boys and "that clash is sure to make for some potent drama." In the 2018 Digital Spy Reader Awards, O'Connor was nominated for "Best Soap Newcomer"; he came in thirteenth place with 1.8% of the total votes.
