= Roo Stewart =

- Home and Away character
- Georgie Parker as Roo Stewart (2020)
- Portrayed by: Justine Clarke (1988–1989); Georgie Parker (2010–present)
- Duration: 1988–1989, 2010–present
- First appearance: 20 January 1988
- Introduced by: Alan Bateman (1988); Cameron Welsh (2010)
- Book appearances: Family Matters; Home and Away Volume 1: Summer Bay Blues; Home and Away Volume 2: Scandal at Summer Bay
- Justine Clarke as Roo Stewart (1988)
In-universe information
- Occupation: Student; Macklin employee; Businesswoman; Foster parent; Waitress; University lecturer; Teacher
- Father: Alf Stewart
- Mother: Martha Stewart
- Stepmother: Ailsa Stewart
- Half-brothers: Owen Dalby; Duncan Stewart; Kieran Baldivis
- Half-sisters: Quinn Jackson
- Husband: Frank Morgan (1990–1991); Harvey Ryan (2012–2014)
- Daughters: Martha MacKenzie
- Stepdaughters: Lottie Ryan
- Granddaughters: Lindsay MacKenzie
- Grandfathers: Gordon Stewart
- Grandmothers: Sarah Stewart
- Aunts: Morag Bellingham; Celia Stewart; Barbara Stewart; Debra Stewart; Colleen Smart
- Nephews: Ric Dalby; Bryce Stewart; Ryder Jackson
- First cousins: Alan Fisher; Rebecca Nash; Bobby Simpson; Lance Smart
- Other relatives: Seb Miller

Ruth "Roo" Stewart (also Morgan) is a fictional character from the Australian soap opera Home and Away, played by Justine Clarke from 1988 to 1989. The character made her first screen appearance during the episode broadcast on 20 January 1988. Clarke quit the role in 1989 and the character was written out. In August 2010, it was announced that Roo would return to Home and Away with Georgie Parker in the role. The character returned on 29 October 2010.

== Casting ==
In 1987, Clarke auditioned for the roles of Carly Morris, Lynn Davenport and Bobby Simpson; but was unsuccessful each time. After the series had finished filming their pilot episode, producers changed their minds and invited Clarke to audition for the role of Roo, which she won. Clarke told a reporter from TV Life that she was "really pleased" because she thought Roo was a "great character". Filming on the serial began in Sydney in December 1987, and Clarke's casting was publicised on 2 January 1988. She joined the cast as a series regular. Her character was confirmed to be a love interest for Frank Morgan (Alex Papps). Clarke and Papps met for the first time on the first day of filming. David Brown of TV Week reported that the Frank/Roo romance would develop into a major storyline.

== Development ==
=== Characterisation ===
Roo is the much-hated character who attempts to sabotage her father's marriage to Ailsa and who nearly fools Frank into marrying her by claiming that she is carrying his baby. There are two sides to her personality; to the adults she is charming and personable. To people her own age she is boy-crazy and scheming.

— Kesta Desmond on Roo (1990).

Before her debut, Clarke said her character was "boy crazy". She explained that Roo is used to getting her own way and usually does, adding "she's heavily into boys." Roo's personality gained an unwelcome reception amongst viewers. Clarke said that "everyone" hated Roo and revealed that people would "boo" at her while attending promotional appearances. On one occasion Clarke had to leave a shopping centre because females were shouting "slut" at her. Clarke said that Roo is "a cow" but defended her because Roo ultimately ends up suffering.

=== Teenage pregnancy ===
In the serial's first season, Alan Bateman wanted Home and Away to tackle serious social issues and a few months later Roo became the first character to have a teenage pregnancy. The production team felt that Roo's pregnancy was "risqué" because Home and Away was aired in an early evening time-slot. Clarke said she did not know what it was like to be pregnant and had to carry out research. While filming the storyline, Clarke was required to wear a bag filled with lentils beneath her clothing. This was to give the impression that Roo was pregnant, and as her pregnancy progressed more lentils were added to the bag to maintain continuity. Clarke remained unaware of how to portray a convincing birth scene. The wife of the episode's director had previously given birth during a complicated labour. She helped Clarke with her research, which also included watching child birth videos. Clarke said that while she had learned most aspects of labour, not experiencing the actual pain of birth resulted in her feeling unprepared for the scenes. The birth scenes were filmed over the period of one day, consisting of more than fifteen shoots. Clarke said the dramatic breathing left her "dizzy" and even caused her to hyperventilate.

Following the birth, Roo decides to have her daughter adopted out. This marked a temporary two-week departure for the character, as she goes to the city to make arrangements off-screen. For Roo's return, producers created "a new, glamorous and confident" look for her. Of this, Clarke said "Roo's grown up a lot while she's been away because of the trauma of it all. She's out to live down her bad name." Roo's return coincides with Frank's proposal to Bobby Simpson (Nicolle Dickson), but instead of what everyone is expecting, she actually gives the couple her blessing. Clarke said Roo is trying to be nice, but no one believes or trusts her, which Clarke thought was understandable given Roo's history. Clarke also revealed that the reason Roo is so accepting of Frank and Bobby's engagement is that she has a new love interest, whose identity was initially kept a secret. Clarke told David Brown of TV Week that everyone thinks she is making it up when she declares that she is in love, until her boyfriend arrives in the Bay. Clarke added "It's a very good storyline. I'll be able to tackle another teenage problem."

=== Departure and return ===
Clarke played the role of Roo from 1988, until the character was written out a year later after Clarke quit the show. Clarke has been asked to return to the show and reprise her role as Roo many times, but she has never agreed.

In August 2010, it was announced that Roo would be returning to Home and Away. Producers decided to recast the role after Clarke became busy with other television shows and her career as a children's singer. Former All Saints actress, Georgie Parker was given the role and she began filming her first scenes in the same month. Of her casting, Parker said "I'm thrilled to be back at Channel Seven and to be part of Home and Away. Working with Ray is a joy. We are having a fantastic time together. The whole cast and crew have been wonderful". Of the decision to bring the character back, series producer Cameron Welsh said "We had such a positive reaction to Emily Symons's return as Marilyn; we trust the fans will love having an original character such as Roo back in the Bay. Securing Georgie Parker to bring her back to our screens is a real coup for the show".

Parker called her "a colourful character who has a strong history with the origin of the show". Parker has said the grown up Roo is very different from the teenager. She said "She was a colourful character when she left. She lost her mother when she was very young, and I think that when girls lose their mothers, they can go off the rails - and that's exactly what Roo did". Parker added that she gets to play the adult who may have learned from past mistakes. During an interview, Meagher said the adult Roo is "still full of energy, bluff and bravado. She's had a few financial problems and is possibly running away from a bloke." He added that Alf has trouble getting her to tell him the truth, but he is "pleased to see her back in the Bay."

=== Meningitis ===
In July 2014, the character was diagnosed with meningitis. After returning from an extended trip to Las Vegas to look after her injured aunt Colleen Smart (Lyn Collingwood), Roo was very secretive about her times away. Within a day, Roo started showing symptoms of an illness. Parker explained "This illness hits her fast and hard. She's lethargic, but thinks it's just jetlag. She also has a splitting headache that affects her eyes, and she's low on energy. It's all very out of character." Roo's decision to keep quiet about her trip meant that nobody had any idea what was wrong with her. Roo fell unconscious at home and the situation became very serious. Roo was eventually diagnosed with meningitis. Her condition later took a turn for the worse and she suffered a seizure. In order to treat her, the doctors needed to know about her trip and her foster-daughter Maddy Osborne (Kassandra Clementi) found her passport, which revealed that she had been to Peru. With the information, the doctors were able to treat Roo and save her life.

== Storylines ==
=== 1988–1989 ===
Roo begins to resent her father's relationship with Ailsa Hogan (Judy Nunn) out of loyalty to her late mother, Martha (Alison Mulvaney). Roo begins dating Frank Morgan and they start a band with Lance Smart (Peter Vroom) and Martin Dibble (Craig Thompson). Roo's continued obsession with Ailsa drives a rift between her and Frank, despite nearly sleeping with him as an act of rebellion over Ailsa staying over. Roo contacts her aunt, Morag Bellingham (Cornelia Frances), who is a judge and asks her to do a background check on Ailsa. At Alf and Ailsa's engagement party, Roo reveals Ailsa went to prison for killing her abusive father. However, Ailsa's friends and Frank, side with her. Roo begins a feud with Bobby Simpson, Ailsa's friend. Tired of her behaviour, Alf sends Roo to boarding school in Sydney.

Roo begins dating Brett Macklin (Gerry Sont) and she gets pregnant. Brett's reaction to this to book an abortion for her. Roo returns to Summer Bay and tries convincing Frank that he is the baby's father. She pretends to accept Alf and Ailsa's relationship so she will be allowed to stay. Roo sleeps with Frank and arranges for Alf to catch them together. She tells her aunt, Celia Stewart (Fiona Spence), that she is pregnant with Frank's baby. Frank agrees to marry her and Roo tries to accept Alf and Ailsa's marriage. Brett turns up and tells Roo the mumps has left him infertile and that he now wants the baby. She refuses to let him back into her life, so Brett goes to Morag, who tries to talk Roo into changing her mind. In the middle of her wedding, she reveals that Frank is not the father of her baby. Frank drives off in anger and swerves off the road to avoid Bobby and the car falls into a ditch, almost killing him.

The incident leaves Roo an outcast within the town. Morag tries to persuade her to move to the city with her, but Celia talks her out of it. Brett applies for custody, but Roo suggests they sort it out between themselves. She begins helping Brett's family as they set up a business in the Bay. She is pleased when Alf and Ailsa's differences over the development causes them to split up. With Ailsa returning to town to be Christopher Fletcher's (Ashleigh Bell-Weir) godmother, Roo fakes stomach pains to stop Alf attending the christening. However, by hyperventilating she sends herself into premature labour and gives birth to a baby girl, who she names, Martha (Burcin Kapkin). She is pleased when Frank seems to take an interest, until she learns that he is dating Bobby. Brett tries to force Roo into giving him custody of Martha. He kidnaps the baby and Roo considered suicide, before she is informed that Brett had returned Martha. Roo refuses to press charges and the couple realise that they cannot raise Martha, so they give her up for adoption. Roo then begins to accept Ailsa, when she and Alf reconcile.

Roo decides to take a break from the Bay and when she returns, she reveals that she has a new boyfriend, David Lee (Anthony Wong). Alf and Celia are slightly shocked as David is Chinese and they are uncomfortable with Roo being in a mixed race relationship. Alf eventually gives the pair his blessing, but David later leaves town. Frank and Bobby marry and Roo is stunned to learn Bobby is Morag's daughter and thus her cousin. Roo takes a job at the Macklin Corporation. Her manager, Nicholas Walsh (Robert Taylor), sends nasty letters to Ailsa and frames Roo, with help from Morag. With Alf and Ailsa believing the letters are from her, Roo moves in with Celia and then with Morag. When Alf discovers the truth, he apologises and Roo moves back in. She then starts dating Simon Yates (Christopher Saunders).

Ailsa becomes pregnant, which pleases Roo. Alf and Tom Fletcher (Roger Oakley) go missing on a fishing trip and Ailsa goes into premature labour. Roo stays as her half-brother Duncan (Allana Ellis) is born, shortly before Alf is found. Roo finds herself working closely with Frank and when he is offered a promotion in the city, he celebrates by kissing Roo. She feels guilty about the kiss and when Frank goes to the city without Bobby, everyone assumes he and Roo had an affair. Roo is upset when Sally Fletcher (Katie Ritchie) blames her for the break-up. Bobby tells her that she and Frank would have broken up anyway and gives them her blessing. Roo then goes to the city to meet Frank and tells him she wants to give their relationship another go. Frank and Roo marry, but they split by the time Frank returns to town. Roo later moves to New York, where she is joined for a time by both Martha and Duncan. In 2005, Roo has a near fatal car-accident and Alf and Morag fly to New York to be with her while she recovers.

=== 2010– ===
Five years later, Roo returns to Summer Bay. Alf is shocked to see her and Roo tells him that she has come for a visit as a job fell through and she had some frequent-flyer miles to use up. Roo starts receiving texts and calls from her boyfriend, Tim, and her bank manager. Colleen Smart is also shocked to see Roo and starts mentioning all the bad things she did in the past, until Alf tells her to stop. Robert Robertson (Socratis Otto) questions Roo about Martha and Hugo Austin (Bernard Curry) for the Federal Police and she states that she has not been in contact with them. Roo later tries to persuade Hugo's mother, Gina (Sonia Todd), to give them the money Hugo left behind, but Gina is reluctant. Gina runs a credit check on Roo and discovers that she is broke. Roo denies wanting the money for herself. Roo advises Alf to get a lawyer when rumours begin to circulate that he killed Penn Graham (Christian Clark). Gina gets Roo to take a job with John Palmer (Shane Withington), who pays her with Hugo's money. Roo attends Bianca Scott's (Lisa Gormley) bridal shower and wedding, before leaving for the States.

On her return, Roo finds Alf has gone travelling and her aunt Morag has been placed in charge of the caravan park. Roo goes to the relaunch of Angelo Rosetta's (Luke Jacobz) restaurant where she gets drunk and wakes up in bed with Miles Copeland (Josh Quong Tart). Angelo offers Roo a room at his place and tries to make a pass at her. John hires Roo to organise sponsorship for the upcoming surf carnival. Roo becomes close friends with Nicole Franklin (Tessa James) and Marilyn Chambers (Emily Symons). She also gets on well with Marilyn's partner, Sid Walker (Robert Mammone). Roo supports Nicole during her pregnancy and she asks her to be present at the birth. Roo also supports Romeo Smith's (Luke Mitchell) attempts to start a charter business. Laura Carmody (Roxanne Wilson) arrives in the Bay and reveals she and Roo are old friends. Roo invites Laura to stay with her and they work together on a hospital fundraiser. Roo invites Romeo to accompany her on a business trip to Hawaii and he brings Indigo Walker (Samara Weaving) with them. When they announce that they are getting married, Roo calls Sid and he flies over. Sid kisses Roo, but she rejects him because he is with Marilyn. However, she runs after his taxi, but fails to stop him leaving.

When she returns home, Roo is shocked to learn Marilyn and Sid have broken up. She and Sid kiss again and agree to be a couple. Roo and Laura organise a ball at Sid's farm and Roo tries to make peace with Marilyn. Bianca is raped at the ball and Roo criticises Laura for selling tickets to the River Boys. Alf disapproves of Roo's relationship with Sid, as he is worried about how he will treat her. Roo and Marilyn eventually become friends again and Roo breaks up with Sid when she realises his family will always be a priority over her. Roo takes over the running of the Diner due to staff shortages and she starts dating Harvey Ryan (Marcus Graham), despite being warned not to by Romeo, Indi and Sid. Roo and Harvey break up when she learns he sabotaged Alf's boat. Roo is disgusted when Harvey tries to blackmail John and she persuades Alf to stand against him during the council elections. Roo later takes a job alongside Harvey and becomes jealous of him and his girlfriend, Fleur Simpson (Alys Daroy). Roo and Harvey later get back together and she is surprised when his ex-wife, Mel (Allison Cratchley), and daughter, Lottie (Morgan Weaving), arrive in Summer Bay.

Sid tells Roo that Harvey had a young son who drowned and she becomes upset that Harvey did not tell her. Harvey admits to Roo that he and the Mayor rigged the election, so he would win. Harvey is arrested and Roo stands by him. She later tells Harvey that she loves him. Roo bonds with Lottie and agrees that she can move in with her and Harvey, when Mel goes to the city. Lottie and Mel eventually leave the Bay and Harvey asks Roo to marry him. Roo's ex-boyfriend, Tim (Jonny Pasvolsky), comes to the Bay and tries to win Roo back. Harvey and Roo marry and they take in teen runaways Maddy Osborne and Spencer Harrington (Andrew Morley). Harvey sails around the world with his best friend, Winston Markman (John Batchelor). Winston returns a few months later to tell Roo that he lost Harvey. Roo holds a memorial service for Harvey and says goodbye. Roo is delighted when Harvey eventually returns. However, he cannot cope being back in the Bay, causing problems with his marriage. Roo decides the best thing for them to do is get divorced. Harvey agrees and leaves the Bay.

When Colleen has an accident, Roo flies to Las Vegas to care for her. On her return, she becomes ill and collapses. She is diagnosed with meningitis and has to have fluid removed from her brain, but she shows no improvement. Nate Cooper (Kyle Pryor) discovers growths on her brain and her family learn that Roo went to Peru, where she had suffered a reaction to her inoculations. Roo is given antiviral drugs and recovers. Roo plans Marilyn and John's wedding. At the reception, she is informed that Maddy has stolen her credit card to buy clothes. Maddy is later fired from the gym for stealing and Roo pays off her debt, preferring that Maddy owes her instead. When Maddy learns that she has ovarian cancer, Roo supports her through her treatment. Alf collapses during a school field trip to a war memorial and he is diagnosed with post traumatic stress disorder. He experiences mood swings and Roo encourages him to speak to a therapist. James Edmunds (Myles Pollard) returns to the Bay and offers Roo a job as a lecturer at the university. She and James get on well and begin dating. Roo and Maddy then move in with James. He later proposes to her and she accepts. James and Roo try to get married quickly, but their wedding is stopped by Alf who thinks James lied about where he used to work. James and Roo then decide to put the wedding on hold. Roo later discovers James is already married with children, and has been lying to her all along. She calls off their engagement, but continues her relationship with him. After James confesses to Roo that he also lied to her about his parents being alive, she finally breaks up with him.

When Roo visits her brother Duncan in Hawaii, she meets James Mayvers (Tim Ross) and they begin a relationship. Roo initially tries to keep the relationship a secret due to the age gap between them, but Morag soon catches them together. Roo faints and is convinced by Morag that she is going through the menopause. However, she soon learns she is pregnant. James tells Roo that he does not want children and asks her to have an abortion, but she refuses and decides to the raise the child as a single parent. James's father David Mayvers (Noel Hodda) offers Roo $250,000 with the condition that she or her child does not contact James. Roo turns the offer down. While driving back from the pharmacy, she collapses in pain. Nate and Tori Morgan (Penny McNamee) find her and diagnose a ruptured ectopic pregnancy. She undergoes surgery, but loses the baby. Roo leaves town to try and find Martha, but she is unsuccessful and returns home.

Roo helps Marilyn with her Stunning Organics battle after she suffers an allergic reaction to the cream. When Roo tries to help Marilyn report this to Stunning Organics they continue to send Marilyn boxes of product to sell and Roo suggests that they find a legal way out, but since Marilyn's contract is ironclad she has no choice but to follow her contract. Marilyn with the help of Roo and Kirby they take the battle to social media and this results in someone from Stunning Organics planting a box with an explosive in it and when Marilyn finds out that there is bomb in one of the boxes she tries to ring Roo and John but she ends up telling Mali that there's a bomb in the van they've taken. Mali goes to the rescue and tells them to get out of the van, when the van explodes it leaves Roo, John and Mali injured. Roo is the more seriously injured with a neck fracture and when she is in hospital she reveals that she cannot feel her legs and that something is wrong. Roo struggles to breathe properly and is placed into a coma and flown to the city for urgent surgery. Rose later tells Marilyn that the bomber has been arrested.

Alf receives a phone call from Martha telling him Roo has woken up. Roo spends time recovering in the hospital in the city, before returning to Northern Districts Hospital. She makes it clear that she wants to go home. When Marilyn visits, Roo tells her to leave. When she is eventually discharged, Marilyn is placed in charge of her care as Alf has had to go away. Roo asks Marilyn to leave the house, saying that while everyone has moved on, she is struggling with her injuries. Marilyn tries to tell her that no one has forgotten, but Roo points out that Marilyn did not visit her and then blames her for what happened. As Roo continues her recovery, Irene steps in and tells Roo that she needs to take some responsibility for what happened with Stunning Organics because it was not just Marilyn's fault. Roo and Marilyn reconcile, although Alf is suspicious of their behaviour when he returns home. Roo and Marilyn later help Irene to make a photo album for Alf.

Roo begins fostering as a solo parent and takes in Eliza Sherwood (Martha Kate Morgan), who steals from Marilyn, records Harper Matheson (Jessica Redmayne) giving birth in the hope that something bad might happen, and hides Alf's heart medication. Roo has no option but to report Eliza and she later learns that Eliza is undergoing a psychiatric evaluation. Roo's next charge is Cohen Luther (Nathan Murray), whom she considers adopting when his mother relinquishes custody. However, Cohen's father is eventually found and he leaves with him. After five months in Merimbula visiting Martha, Roo tells Marilyn that she is coming home, however, she does not turn up. When Alf sends her a text, a stranger with Roo's phone replies to him as Roo saying that she is having car trouble. Two days later, Alf, Justin Morgan (James Stewart) and Leah Patterson (Ada Nicodemou) become worried that Roo has not been in touch and all phone calls are going straight to voicemail. Alf then reports her disappearance to the police. Two weeks later, Sergeant David Langham (Jeremy Lindsay Taylor) finds Roo at a makeshift camp in the forest, having spotted her fire. At the police station, Roo is reunited with Alf and checked over by Dr Amelia Carlisle (Nicole da Silva). Roo cannot tell David what happened to her and Amelia suspects she is suffering from dissociative amnesia, which she explains is Roo's mind blocking something traumatic that she witnessed.

== Reception ==
A writer for Ausculture named Roo fifth on their Top Ten Aussie Soap Villains list. They called Roo "evil" for trying to break up Alf's relationship with Ailsa, lying to and trying to marry Frank, leaving him at the altar and later having an affair with him. They added "If she hadn't already left town, I wouldn't have been surprised to hear that she was driving the speedboat that struck down Summer Bay's beloved butch Bobby and killed her. On the plus side, she does have the rather hilarious name of 'Roo'." Andrew Mercado described Roo as Alf Stewart's (Ray Meagher) "Minxy teenage daughter" in his book, Super Aussie soaps: behind the scenes of Australia's best loved TV shows. A TV Week columnist describe Roo as "Summer Bay's original spoilt brat" who was never very far from drama. A writer from Stockport Express Advertiser described Clarke's version of Roo as a "Summer Bay starlet" and remembered her as "the nasty one who pinched Bobby's husband Frank."

A Holy Soap writer stated that Roo's most memorable moment was "Bowling over her dad Alf by unexpectedly arriving back in Summer Bay after more than two decades away." The Herald Sun said Roo is "Manipulative, mysterious and returned from living what she claims was the high life in New York", they predicted that her motives for returning to the Bay would puzzle viewers. Inside Soap ran a feature compiling "The 100 greatest soap stories ever told". They featured Roo and Frank's wedding story as their 66th choice.

Laura Morgan writing for All About Soap hoped Roo would not steal Sid from Marilyn and said: "Keep your hands off that Sid, Roo!"

In November 2021, three critics for The West Australian placed Roo at number 29 in their feature on the "Top 50 heroes we love and villains we hate" from Home and Away. Of the character, they wrote: "Back in the day Roo was the biggest schemer in the Bay. She put poor Frank, Ailsa and Bobby through hell and lied and connived her way through life. She was the type of character viewers loved to hate. In 2010 it was a new Roo (in more ways than one) who returned to the Bay. Now played by Georgie Parker, mature Roo is way more beige. Do we miss the old Roo? Hell, yeah."

== Bibliography ==
- Desmond, Kesta (1990). Home and Away Annual. Grandreams Ltd. ISBN 0-86227-787-6.
- Mercado, Andrew (2004). Super Aussie soaps: behind the scenes of Australia's best loved TV shows. Pluto Press Australia. ISBN 1-86403-191-3.
- Oram, James (1989). Home and away: behind the scenes. Angus & Robertson. ISBN 0-207-16315-4.
