= Duncan Stewart (Home and Away) =

- Home and Away character
- Brendan McKensy as Duncan Stewart (1999)
- Portrayed by: Allana Ellis (1989); Lewis Devaney (1990–1998); Brendan McKensy (1998–2005); Benedict Wall (2016)
- Duration: 1989–2001, 2004–2005, 2016
- First appearance: 14 June 1989
- Last appearance: 9 November 2016
- Introduced by: Des Monaghan (1989); Julie McGuaran (2004); Lucy Addario (2016)
In-universe information
- Occupation: Student; Charter pilot
- Father: Alf Stewart
- Mother: Ailsa Stewart
- Half-brothers: Owen Dalby
- Half-sisters: Roo Stewart; Quinn Jackson; Shauna Bradley
- Wife: Caroline Stewart (2009–2016)
- Sons: Bryce Stewart
- Grandfathers: Gordon Stewart; Harold O'Rourke
- Grandmothers: Sarah-Jane Stewart
- Uncles: Tony O'Rourke
- Aunts: Morag Bellingham; Celia Stewart; Barbara Stewart; Debra Stewart; Colleen Smart; Bridget Jackson
- Nephews: Ric Dalby; Ryder Jackson
- Nieces: Martha MacKenzie
- First cousins: Lance Smart; Alan Fisher; Rebecca Nash; Bobby Marshall; Emma Jackson; Troy Jackson; Justin Jackson
- Other relatives: Seb Miller

Duncan Stewart is a fictional character from the Australian soap opera Home and Away. He made his first appearance during the episode broadcast on 14 June 1989. He was initially portrayed by Allana Ellis, with actor Lewis Devaney taking over the role from 1990 to 1998. Brendan McKensy assumed the role in 1998 until Duncan's departure in 2001. McKensy later reprised the role in 2004 and 2005 and made his last appearance on 13 July 2005. The character was reintroduced on 19 July 2016, with Benedict Wall cast in the role. Duncan is the son of Ailsa (Judy Nunn) and Alf Stewart (Ray Meagher). His 2016 reappearance marked the first time in 27 years that he, Alf and his half-sister Roo Stewart (Georgie Parker) had been on-screen together. During his time in Summer Bay, Duncan befriends Tori Morgan (Penny McNamee), becoming a love rival for Nate Cooper (Kyle Pryor).

== Casting ==
The character was initially portrayed by Allana Ellis. Lewis Devaney took over the role in 1990 and remained until 1998. The role was then recast to Brendan McKensy. McKensy returned for the serial's 4000th episode, based around Duncan's father Alf Stewart's (Ray Meagher) 60th birthday, broadcast in Australia on 8 July 2005.

== Development ==
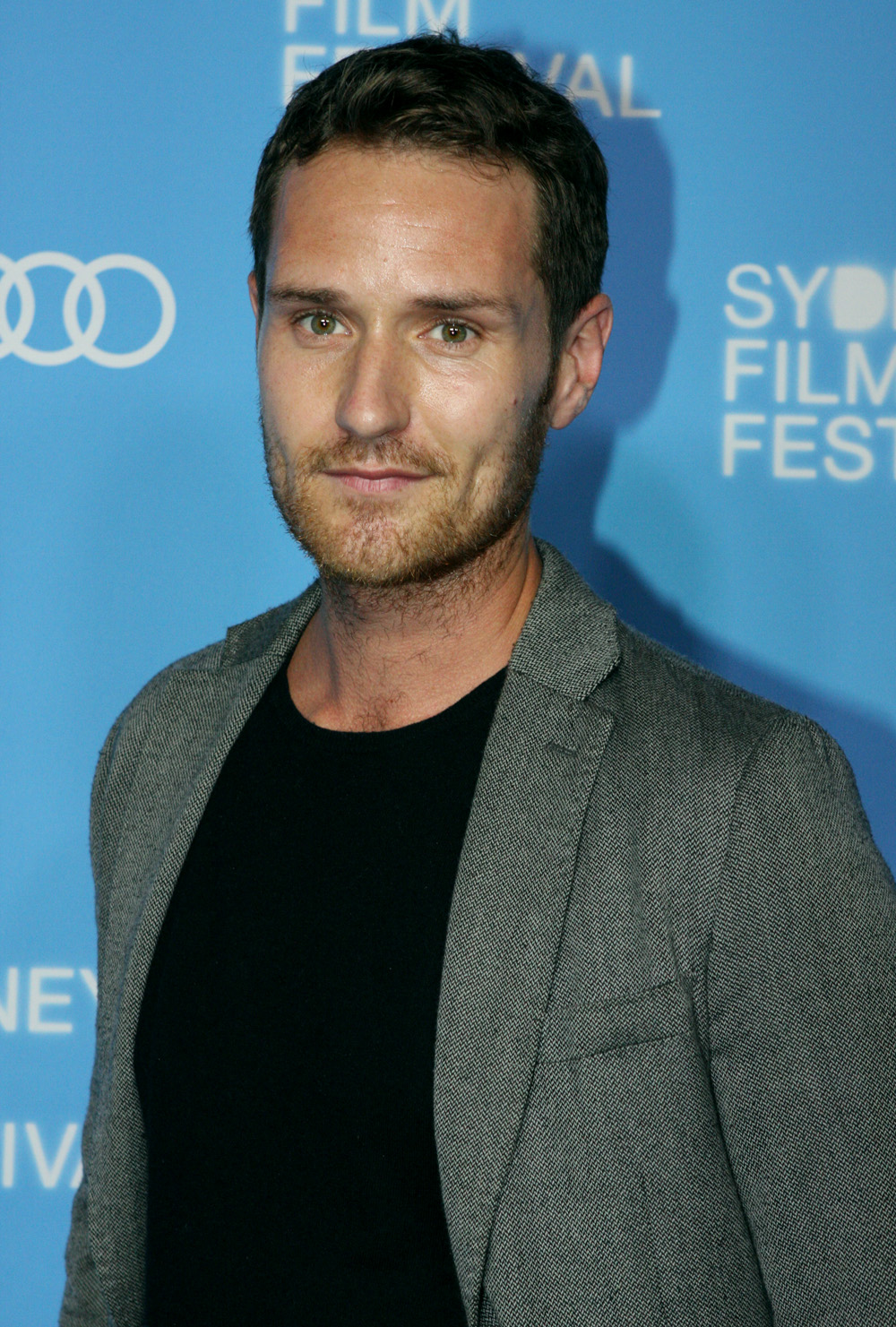
Actor Benedict Wall (pictured) took over the role of Duncan when the character was reintroduced in 2016.

The character departed in 2001. Duncan left Summer Bay in "disgrace" to live with his aunt Morag Bellingham (Cornelia Frances) in the city. Duncan's father Alf initially refused Duncan's request to leave town, so Morag encouraged Duncan to act up, leaving Alf with no other option but to send him away. Duncan "throws himself into the task with gusto" and began insulting people. When his half-sister Shauna Bradley (Kylie Watson) tried to talk to him about his behaviour, Duncan claimed their mother Ailsa (Judy Nunn) never loved her. Alf was "furious" when he heard what happened and confronted Duncan, who finally admitted that he was unhappy in the Bay because no one liked him. Alf then gave his permission for his son to move to the city. Duncan made brief returns in 2004 and 2005.

The character returned on 19 July 2016 with New Zealand actor Benedict Wall cast in the role. Wall originally auditioned for the role of Justin Morgan, but the part went to James Stewart. Wall was in New Zealand when the role of Duncan became available. He sent an audition tape to the producers and they offered him the part. Of his casting, Wall said "It wasn't lost on me that I wasn't from the right part of the world when I got the job. But you know what's funny is when I'm with Ray, I'm always surprised at how much we do seem alike." Wall worked on his Australian accent, but as the character has been living in the United States, it did not need to be too thick.

Shortly after Alf suffers health problems and decides to cut Duncan out of his will, Duncan comes to visit him, but does not receive a warm welcome. Duncan's return marked the first time in 27 years that he, Alf and his half-sister Roo Stewart (Georgie Parker) have been on screen together. Duncan also befriends Tori Morgan (Penny McNamee) and develops "an immediate connection" with her, but ends up competing with Nate Cooper (Kyle Pryor) for her affections. Wall had worked with Pryor before they were cast in the show, and he quipped, "now we're competing for the same woman."

== Storylines ==
Duncan is born to Alf and Ailsa. After his aunt Celia (Fiona Spence) dresses him in the Stewart family's traditional christening gown, he suffers an allergic reaction to it and is hospitalised. Duncan recovers, but Ailsa experiences post-natal depression and nearly smothers him at one point. Ailsa soon begins to bond with him. As Duncan grows older, he befriends Christopher Fletcher (Shaun Wood) and has several surrogate siblings in the form of Blake (Les Hill) and Karen Dean (Belinda Jarrett), Simon Fitzgerald (Richard Norton), Sarah Thompson (Laura Vasquez), Curtis Reed (Shane Ammann) and Aaron Welles (Ritchie Gudgeon), teenagers whom his parents foster.

While following some of the local teenagers who are hanging out in some wasteland, Duncan suffers a fall and injures himself. He is hospitalised for several months and when he returns home, his personality drastically changes. When Duncan starts high school his behaviour gets worse as he frequently causes trouble. One incident includes the making of a homemade bomb with his friend Jack, who burns himself in the process. Alf experiences a shock when the bomb goes off and injures his arm. The Stewarts attend counselling mediated by Natalie Nash (Antoinette Byron).

On a car journey with Ailsa, Duncan drops a tape and tries to retrieve it. Ailsa loses control of the car and it crashes into a lake. Duncan is able to free himself and calls for help. Travis Nash (Nic Testoni) is on the scene and rescues Ailsa, but she remains comatose for several weeks. Duncan blames himself for the accident. The doctors inform Alf and Duncan that Ailsa may never wake up and Alf decides to turn the machine off, but Duncan notices Ailsa make a slight movement and tells the doctors not to turn the machine off.

When homeless teen Mitch McColl (Cameron Welsh) saves Duncan's life, he is grateful and offers him food from the Stewart house. Alf finds out and soon he and Ailsa agree to let Mitch live with them and Mitch and Duncan form a sibling-like bond. Nick Smith (Chris Egan) settles in Summer Bay with his family and he and Duncan quickly become friends and get into various scrapes. The Sutherland family arrive and Duncan and Nick are attracted to the two youngest daughters, Jade (Kate Garven) and Kirsty (Christie Hayes) and begin dating them respectively.

Ailsa dies of a heart attack, causing Duncan's behaviour to worsen and his relationship with Alf suffers. Duncan's friends soon lose patience with him and Jade breaks up with him. Duncan spirals further out of control when he learns that Jade is dating David Barclay and sets a bomb up in his letterbox which backfires badly. After Duncan steals from the Diner and destroys Nick's games console, Alf is at his wits' end. Duncan's aunt Morag Bellingham returns to town and sees how unhappy he is. Duncan later tells her he wants to move to the city with her. Alf is reluctant to let Duncan go, but relents in the end and he leaves with Morag.

Duncan returns to Summer Bay three years later on the night of Robbie Hunter (Jason Smith) and Hayley Smith's (Bec Cartwright) combined 17th and 21st birthday parties. His presence proves an irritation for his late cousin Alan's son Seb Miller (Mitch Firth) who is now dating Jade. Duncan is later revealed to have a drug habit and begins hanging around with Jade and they get high on bulbs. At the party, Duncan steals Robbie's car keys and involves Jade in a drag race. Seb tries to put a stop to it and jumps on the bonnet, but a drug-addled Duncan keeps driving. Jade and Seb are left injured and Duncan is unscathed. Duncan is arrested, but with the legal representation of Morag, he avoids all charges.

Once Jade and Seb leave the Bay after the accident, Alf and Morag try to get Duncan to settle back in and send him to Summer Bay High, where he is unpopular. He antagonises Robbie and Kim Hyde (Chris Hemsworth) and begins harassing Tasha Andrews (Isabel Lucas) when he learns that her biological mother was the late Angie Russell (Laurie Foell). After pulling a gun on Kim and Robbie, Duncan leaves to join his half-sister, Roo (Justine Clarke; Georgie Parker) in New York City. Duncan later contacts Alf with the news that Roo has been involved in a car crash and is in a critical condition. Alf flies out to join them.

The following year, Duncan returns to Summer Bay for Alf's 60th birthday party along with a number of other relatives. He is reluctant to approach Donald Fisher (Norman Coburn), his former uncle and Seb's grandfather. Duncan then apologises for all the grief he caused Seb. During the party, Duncan tries to get closer to Alf, but feels ignored and leaves the party early, taking a bottle of wine with him. After the party, Chloe Richards (Kristy Wright) is killed in a car crash and Duncan is accused by Alf when he resurfaces several days later. Detective Peter Baker (Nicholas Bishop) tells Duncan the paint taken from his car does not match the one found on Chloe's. Although Alf is relieved, Duncan is hurt and angry. After a talk with Alf, Duncan reveals that Roo's accident helped him put things in perspective and he has changed as person. Duncan returns to the United States after repairing his relationship with his father. A few years, later Duncan gets married and Alf flies overseas for a week to attend the wedding, but they fall out over his wife, Caroline Stewart (Nicole Shostak), and barely speak afterwards. Roo contacts Duncan to tell him that Alf has had a stroke and that he has removed Duncan from his will.

Eleven years later, Duncan returns to the Bay to see Roo and patch things up with Alf. He meets Tori Morgan (Penny McNamee) by the pool and they talk about their problems. That night, Duncan comes to Summer Bay House to see Alf and Roo, but Alf walks away. Duncan catches up with Irene Roberts (Lynne McGranger) and Marilyn Chambers (Emily Symons), but Alf initially refuses to listen or talk to him. He later seeks Duncan out and they come to a truce. Over lunch, Duncan tells Roo and Alf that he has a five-year-old son called Bryce. Alf is angered that Duncan did not tell him sooner and throws him out of the house when Duncan mentions the will. Duncan returns to explain that shortly after he got his pilots license, he discovered Caroline had been having an affair. They broke up and she took Bryce to live in Hawaii. He did not want to tell Alf about his son and divorce, as he felt like a failure. Alf and Duncan reconcile. Duncan and Tori spend more time together and when he learns her 30th birthday is coming up, he offers to fly Tori, her brothers and their friends to a vineyard for the day. During the flight, Duncan and the passengers pass out due to a carbon monoxide leak and the plane crashes. They all survive, but Tori's brother Brody Morgan (Jackson Heywood) is missing. Duncan, Tori and Nate Cooper (Kyle Pryor) leave the others to search for him. They later encounter Justin Morgan (James Stewart) and together they find and rescue Brody. Duncan is reunited with Roo and Alf at the hospital. Duncan eventually flies out to Hawaii be with Caroline when she hurts herself.

In 2018, Caroline dies and Alf and Roo fly to the US to attend the funeral.

== Reception ==
For his portrayal of Duncan, McKensy was nominated for Best Young Actor at the 1999 Inside Soap Awards.
