= Tori Morgan =

Fictional character from Home and Away

- Home and Away character
- Portrayed by: Penny McNamee
- Duration: 2016–2021, 2024
- First appearance: 5 May 2016
- Last appearance: 10 April 2024
- Introduced by: Lucy Addario
In-universe information
- Other names: Tessa Lee (birth name)
- Occupation: Doctor; Head of Emergency
- Father: Koby Lee
- Mother: Kate Lee
- Brothers: Justin Morgan; Brody Morgan; Mason Morgan
- Half-sisters: Raffy Morgan
- Husband: Christian Green (2021–)
- Daughters: Grace Morgan
- Nieces: Ava Gilbert

Tori Morgan is a fictional character from the Australian television soap opera Home and Away, played by Penny McNamee. The actress had wanted to appear in the serial since the start of her acting career and described the part as her "dream job". During the audition process, McNamee was paired with various male actors to find the right combination for the Morgan siblings. A month later, she learned that she had won the role of Tori and began filming in November 2015. She made her first appearance during the episode broadcast on 5 May 2016.

The character was introduced to the show along with her three brothers; Brody Morgan (Jackson Heywood), Justin Morgan (James Stewart) and Mason Morgan (Orpheus Pledger). Tori is portrayed as a caring, intelligent, understanding, successful doctor. She is very protective of her brothers and comes to Summer Bay ahead of them to see if it is safe to live there. She is caught up in an explosion at the local caravan park and helps treat several characters. The Morgans initially concealed the fact that they were in witness protection. The storyline saw the siblings targeted by their parents' killers, leading Tori to be held hostage, threatened, and involved in a plane crash.

Later storylines have revolved around Tori's romantic relationships with Nate Cooper (Kyle Pryor), Duncan Stewart (Benedict Wall), and Martin "Ash" Ashford (George Mason). In 2018, a new storyline arc began with Tori deciding to become a mother and saw her undergoing fertility treatment in order to have a child. McNamee confirmed her departure from Home and Away in September 2021 and her final scenes aired that same month, as Tori leaves the Bay with her husband Christian Green (Ditch Davey). She made a brief return in April 2024 for Justin's wedding. For her portrayal of Tori, McNamee has received nominations for the Logie Award for Best New Talent and the Inside Soap Award for Best Daytime Star. Readers of TV Week voted the character as their favourite Morgan out of her and Justin.

== Casting ==
On 22 November 2015, Australian news outlets reported that Penny McNamee had joined the cast of Home and Away as a new doctor called Tori. McNamee stated that the part was her "dream job" and she had wanted to appear on the show since she began her acting career. Following her first audition for the role, McNamee received a call back, along with five other actresses. They were each paired with various male actors to find the right combination for the four Morgan siblings. She explained, "we spent about 10 hours, all 24 of us, going in and matching with different brothers to see which grouping worked best and had the most chemistry – which actors could work well as a family." McNamee admitted that she "desperately" wanted the role, and found the month long wait for news "fairly stressful." When she was contacted, McNamee could not initially answer the call as she was in a hospital with relatives. She filmed her first scenes in early November, and made her debut as Tori on 5 May 2016.

== Development ==
=== Characterisation ===
Tori is the second eldest Morgan sibling and a successful doctor. The show's series producer Lucy Addario said Tori was "a total sweetheart" and someone everyone wants to be friends with. Addario also described Tori as "loving, understanding, caring and supportive." McNamee described her character as having a "warmth and sense of humour", but she tends to avoid personal questions, so others find it hard to connect with her sometimes. The actress called Tori "a total commitment-phobe", and commented that she was nothing like that, as she married her high school sweetheart. Growing up with her three brothers has left Tori able to laugh at herself and good with comebacks during arguments. McNamee told Kerry Harvey of Stuff.co.nz that Tori is "a real family girl".

She is protective of her brothers and often puts them first over everything else, which has affected her romantic life. McNamee added, "I think that's often where she goes wrong." McNamee also said her character is "highly intelligent and driven", and her co-workers respect her "professionalism and her kindness". McNamee initially thought Tori had been written as a "Doctor Death" character, as her early storylines saw the characters she came into contact with die, lose limbs, or have bad events happen to them. The actress stated, "It's been a very bumpy ride for Tori so far. You think she'd leave. You think she would think 'Wow. All the bad stuff happens here, I'm out'." McNamee admitted that she had some trouble pronouncing the medical terms, especially anaesthetic and anaesthetist.

=== Introduction ===
"Tori is running from something I can't quite share yet. Essentially, she's coming to suss out Summer Bay for her family. She's bringing three brothers with her, but she arrives first to see if they'll be safe there."

— McNamee on why Tori comes to Summer Bay (2016).

The character was introduced during the caravan park explosion storyline. Tori attends a fundraiser for the local hospital at the Summer Bay Caravan Park. When a gas bottle is knocked over and ignites, the resulting blast injures many of the attendees. Tori immediately starts to help those who have been injured. Of her character's reaction, McNamee stated, "She sees all these people who need help and she just goes into doctor mode." The actress also thought it was lucky Tori is there, as fellow doctor Nate Cooper (Kyle Pryor) is "emotionally invested" as his friends and wife have been hurt. Tori "tag-teams" with Nate to help save everyone. Back at the hospital, Tori also has "the difficult task" of informing Maddy Osborne (Kassandra Clementi) that her injured arm needs to be amputated. As Tori continues to treat the victims of the explosion, she realises that she feels "at peace" in the Bay and believes that she can settle down there. She also finds the residents are kind and welcoming, which McNamee said was something that Tori has been "craving" for a while.

McNamee also said Tori wants "a fresh start", but she had "some dark secrets." Alf Stewart (Ray Meagher) tries to find out more information about her, after he learns that she is looking for a four-bedroom house. He initially assumes that Tori has a husband and children. Tori is actually looking for a house for herself and her three brothers, who she does not talk about much. McNamee explained, "Tori's brothers aren't there and she hasn't quite figured out if they, as a family, are going to stick around. So, she doesn't want to share too much information if these people aren't going to become their neighbours and friends." Alf begins to suspect Tori is hiding something, as she tries to dodge his questions. Tori's brothers eventually arrive in the Bay, and Tori helps defuse a fight between Justin and Martin "Ash" Ashford (George Mason), as she announces that he, Brody, and Mason are her siblings. McNamee teased, "So far, Tori has been very mysterious. But her brothers arrive, and that's when things really take off and all her secrets will be spilled!"

=== Witness protection ===
Upon their introduction, an Inside Soap columnist observed that the Morgans appeared to live a normal life, but they had "a dangerous past" and nobody was allowed to know who they really were. The family initially keep to themselves, and Justin warns Tori against befriending Nate. Stewart commented that it does not matter how upset Tori is by Justin's demand, "it's just 'no' to making friends with Nate." Stewart also said that the Morgans have to live by a certain set of rules, which relate to their secret. Justin is concerned when Tori admits that she told Nate their parents are dead, as he does not want Nate "to follow the crumbs." Mason's former girlfriend Lara Adams (Elle Harris) comes to the Bay to see him, and Mason tells her that his family are in witness protection. Brody later reveals that he is being followed and Justin thinks the family need to leave the Bay immediately. Guest character Spike Lowe (Jason Montgomery) was soon introduced to the storyline. After he approaches Nate to talk, it emerges that he has been tracking the Morgans.

Spike later drugs Nate with ketamine and he collapses. When Tori finds a needle mark on his arm, she believes that someone has harmed Nate to get to her. As the staff wonder if Nate has been using drugs, Tori "is full of fear and panic", as she knows the incident is connected to her family. She also knows that she needs to look after Nate, keep her brothers safe, and continue being professional when letting Nate know what has happened without giving her secret away. Tori learns Spike is responsible after viewing CCTV footage, and she rushes home knowing that her family need to leave because their location has been discovered. However, Spike is already inside the house and he is "really violent towards her". McNamee told Cromarty (TV Week) that Tori is aware that there are people out there who want to hurt her family, but this is the first time she has been physically assaulted. The actress described the ordeal as "terrifying" and said Tori fears that Spike is going to kill her. Justin arrives home and Tori worries that he will endanger them both, as he is a "hothead".

In the wake of the Spike's appearance, the Morgans are moved to a safe house by their police liaison officer Atticus Decker (John Adam), where they all agree that they are sick of running from the drugs syndicate that killed their parents. While Tori, Brody and Justin are arguing, Mason slips outside to meet Lara and it emerges that she is working for Spike and Blaine Varden (Ashley Lyons), the man who killed the Morgan's parents. Spike and Blaine hold the family hostage at gunpoint. The scriptwriters later devised a large stunt storyline involving a plane crash. Tori's love interest Duncan Stewart (Benedict Wall) organises a plane trip to a winery for her birthday and invites her friends and family along. However, Justin is not with the group and tries to contact them, after receiving a threatening message from Spike, who has sabotaged the plane. The passengers pass out from a carbon dioxide leak, but Duncan manages to make a crash landing in the sand, minimising the impact and ensuring the survival of everyone on board. McNamee revealed that the plane crash sequence was filmed two hours north of Sydney. The cast spent 12 hours filming in sand dunes and the heat, which McNamee described as fun, but "hard work".

Later developments in the storyline saw the Morgans find their half-sister Raffy Morrison (Olivia Deeble), while members of the syndicate are arrested and jailed. The Morgans realise that they are finally free of witness protection, and they decide to keep their assigned identities instead of returning to their old names. Speaking to Sarah Ellis of Inside Soap, McNamee said that having been in witness protection for seven years, the family find it hard to believe that they are finally safe. She continued, "There are still some loose ends to be tied up, though, and unfortunately that spells danger for the family." As part of the show's 2016 season finale, Tori is kidnapped and brought to corrupt police officer Ranae Turner (Sacha Horler), who then lures Justin to their location. Ranae threatens to kill them both, before going after Brody and Mason. McNamee stated, "This is high stakes for Tori and Justin – the syndicate murdered their parents, and they're prepared to kill again." Justin and Tori free themselves and flee, but Ranae stabs Justin.

During Home and Aways season opener in January 2017, Justin is rushed to the hospital in a serious condition and needing surgery. Tori finds that Nate is busy with a patient, and asks the nurses to prep Justin, as she will have to perform the surgery herself. At the last moment, new surgeon Riley Hawkins (Ryan O'Kane) steps in to perform the operation. He calls Tori by her real name, Tess, and it emerges that they used to be in a relationship. McNamee described the moment as "shocking" for Tori, as she has not seen Riley in seven years. Riley is also surprised to learn that Tori and her family have been in witness protection, which is why they left so suddenly. McNamee praised the writers for the witness protection storyline and said she loved working so closely with Stewart, Heywood and Pledger. She added that she was happy about moving on from the plot and focus on more "joyful" stories for Tori.

=== Love triangles ===
==== Nate Cooper and Duncan Stewart ====
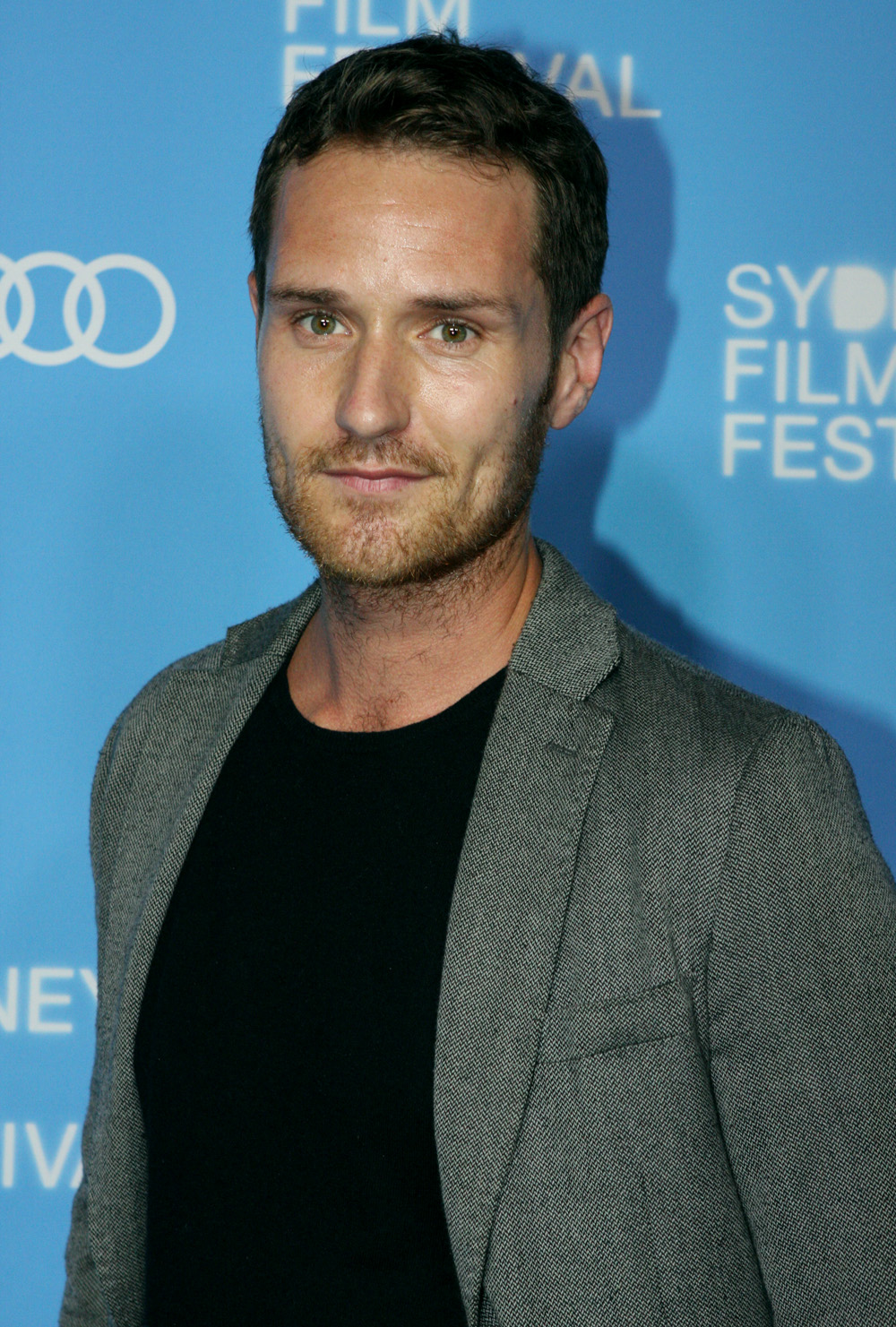
Tori becomes involved in her first love triangle with Nate Cooper and Duncan Stewart (actor Benedict Wall pictured).

Tori's friendship with Nate becomes the subject of gossip among the nurses at the hospital. Nate is struggling to move on from the breakdown of his marriage to Ricky Sharpe (Bonnie Sveen) and confides in Tori. Pryor told TV Week's Stephen Downie that Tori is someone Nate can really talk to and she provides "a nice escape" for him, which he values. After Tori sees a group of nurses staring at her, she and Nate learn that there is a rumour going around that Tori is the reason Nate and Ricky's marriage ended. Nate tells his colleagues that Ricky left him because of issues between them, and that Tori was not involved, so they should get on with their work. Tori is appreciative of Nate's efforts to quash the rumour, but their friendship is left strained. However, later that week, Tori comes over to Nate's home with a bottle of wine and falls asleep on his couch.

The writers continued to put obstacles in the way of Tori and Nate forming a relationship, by developing a love triangle for the characters. Tori is "devastated" when Nate begins dating Danika Kulevski (Ash Ricardo), however, she soon befriends Alf's son Duncan, who makes it clear that he is attracted to her. McNamee said Tori becomes "flustered" by Duncan's advances, as she has feelings for Nate, but he is the less complicated option. She also finds his upfront attitude "refreshing". A drunk Nate later comes to Tori's home and declares that he does have feelings for her. When Duncan organises the plane trip for her birthday, Tori is overwhelmed by the gesture, as she has yet to work out her feelings for him. Tori is torn between Nate and Duncan, and is further confused when Nate admits that what he said while drunk was genuine. McNamee commented, "Tori is still wary of Nate, but can't deny her feelings. She has this natural chemistry she tries to avoid, but can't." Tori turns Nate down, as she wants to give Duncan a chance. However, Nate refuses to accept her rejection and joins the group going on the trip.

Following the plane crash, Justin tells Tori that it is time they relaxed their rules on forming relationships, which changes Tori's mind about closing herself off from romance. She meets up with Duncan, as she knows he is blaming himself for the crash, and they have a picnic at the caravan park. As they get to know each other, Tori "gets gutsy" and kisses Duncan. McNamee pointed out that he was the first person Tori had let herself get close to in seven years. Tori and Duncan's relationship comes under strain following the introduction of his former wife Caroline Stewart (Nicole Shostak) and young son Bryce (Jack and Ace Long). It soon emerges that Caroline has Huntington's disease and Tori assumes that Duncan will leave the Bay to care for her, but he chooses to stay with Tori. Duncan commits to the relationship, while Tori still has feelings for Nate. Duncan later leaves to look after Bryce, which ends the relationship with Tori.

McNamee explained that while Tori is attracted to Nate, she thinks he is the "dangerous option" due to his relationship history. When Nate and Tori get stuck in a hospital elevator, they end up having sex. They become awkward around each other, as they work out what the moment means for their relationship. Tori later tells Nate that she does not want it to be a one off, or the start of a casual relationship, but he admits that he does not want that either and they kiss. The couple initially decide to keep their relationship a secret, until Tori admits that she dislike the secrecy. Sophie Dainty of Digital Spy noted that Tori's change of heart was "slightly ironic given her family history." Nate agrees, and kisses her in front of Kat Chapman (Pia Miller) to show they are together, before they go on their first actual date.

==== Nate Cooper and Riley Hawkins ====
Writers soon implemented a break up for the couple, and began a second love triangle for Tori. When the Morgans' involvement with the drug syndicate and their time in witness protection is printed on the front page of the local newspaper, Nate comes to Tori's home to confront her, before she has a chance to talk to him about it. As Tori apologises for not saying something sooner, Nate struggles to deal with her past and questions whether he really knows her. When Tori begs him to give her a chance, telling him that she is still the same women he fell for, Nate replies that he cannot be with someone who does not trust him. McNamee called the development "a pretty big speed bump in the road for Tori and Nate."

Tori's former boyfriend, surgeon Riley Hawkins (O'Kane) was introduced in early 2017. As he and Tori work alongside each other at the hospital, Nate becomes jealous that Tori has history with another man. Riley informs Tori that Nate made a bet about winning her back, which escalates the rift between her and Nate. Tori also sees Nate berating Mason at the hospital, so when she sees Riley offering Mason the chance to help him out, she softens towards him and later invites him for a drink. The former couple soon get back together. In an interview with Sarah Ellis of Inside Soap, McNamee thought that Tori was tempted by Riley, as she was feeling vulnerable after Nate's rejection. She finds Riley "fun and flirty, and he makes Tori feel a bit wild!" McNamee continued saying that Tori's heart ultimately lies with Nate, and found that viewers agreed.

Tori and Riley's relationship does not last long. Brody tells his sister that he saw Riley flirting with Evelyn MacGuire (Philippa Northeast), leading Tori to doubt Riley's commitment to her, especially as he cheated on her once before. Riley later asks Tori to move to the city with him. He then sets Nate up, suggesting that Nate has committed medical negligence in Billie Ashford's (Tessa de Josselin) death, which Tori has to help investigate. Tori finds issues with Riley's report, and Nate is later cleared. Tori confronts Riley and accuses him of making deliberate exaggerations about Billie's health in a bid to get Nate fired, which he does not deny. Riley accuses Tori of still having feelings for Nate, and she ends their relationship.

Pryor decided to leave the serial in 2017 and his exit aired in June of that year, meaning his character's relationship with Tori would end shortly after they get back together. Nate and Tori's relationship becomes strained when Nate reveals that he recently turned down a job with CareFlight. Tori believes that they should have discussed it together, and later becomes "frustrated" when Nate keeps secrets for Zac MacGuire (Charlie Clausen). Tori was then brought into Brody's drug addiction storyline, as Nate decides to break up with her. Just before he has the chance to tell her the relationship is over, Tori drinks from a water jug and immediately falls ill, leading to her hospitalisation. She later learns that she has been poisoned by Brody's drug dealer William Zannis (Caleb Alloway), who poured potassium into the water jug.

=== Relationship with Martin Ashford ===
Following her break up with Nate, producers decided to pair Tori with Martin "Ash" Ashford (George Mason). The story arc begins with the pair bonding, as Tori treats Ash's young niece Luc Patterson when she is hospitalised. Tori develops a crush on Ash after seeing his "caring, paternal side", and she offers her support when he realises that he will have to raise Luc as a single parent, following his own relationship break up with Kat Chapman. When Tori encourages Ash to have a night off, he suggests they have lunch together at his apartment instead. Tori and Ash share "an emotionally charged moment" in which they almost kiss when Ash opens up to Tori, and she makes a quick exit. Speaking to an Inside Soap columnist, McNamee explained "Every girl has a crush on a bad boy at some stage, and now it's Tori's turn! However, Tori is scared that she is imagining Ash's feelings for her. She thinks that he couldn't possibly like her, which is why she runs off."

"Ash and Tori are a classic case of opposites attract. They have different interests and different personalities, but they both want the same things out of life. They cherish family and are loyal to a fault – they both want children, and really care for each other. It's a beautiful relationship built on trust and friendship."

— McNamee on Tori and Ash's relationship. (2017)

Ash and Kat go on a date to repair their relationship. Both Ash and Kat confide in Tori about how the date went. Of her character's reaction, McNamee commented, "She was optimistic that there was something there, and was floored when they shared a moment. But when Kat and Ash go on a date, she's embarrassed for thinking there might have been something." McNamee also said that Tori does not want to risk jeopardising her friendship with Kat, so she does not plan to take her crush any further. She noted that Tori's feelings for Ash prevent her from being a good friend to Kat, leaving her feeling "torn and disloyal." Kat soon realises that she and Ash have been talking about their relationship with Tori, and accuses Tori of "meddling". Their friendship is strained as Kat becomes suspicious of why Tori has been around more than usual. She later confronts Ash for not realising that Tori likes him and asks that he does not spend time with her anymore.

After Ash and Kat's relationship ends, Tori tells her friend Leah Patterson (Ada Nicodemou) that she is not interested in pursuing Ash, so Leah encourages Tori to go on a date with another man, leading Tori to arrange a date with policeman Colin (Ben Barber), who she meets in the queue at the diner. Ash is shown to be jealous of the development and spies on Tori and Colin during their date. Tori is "furious" when Ash disrupts the date, prompting Colin to leave. Later that day, Ash comes to see Tori to apologise, and he declares his feelings for her. Tori refuses to take his declaration seriously, believing that Ash is just on the rebound from Kat. Tori goes on another date with Colin, while Ash turns up with a date of his own, leading to jealousy from them both. When both dates come to an end, Tori and Ash argue before he kisses her. She responds for a few seconds, before pushing him away as she assumes he is still on the rebound. McNamee found that viewers liked the couple and were waiting for them to get together.

Tori and Ash eventually start a relationship. Their first date, a meal at Salt, does not go according to plan when they realise that some of the locals are watching them, Ash's drink is knocked over, while Tori receives an emergency call. Ash and Tori share a "passionate" kiss, but he cuts the date short to get back to Luc. Scriptwriters soon wrote in a big obstacle for the couple when Kat learns she is pregnant. After assuming that her new partner Robbo (Jake Ryan) is the father, Kat realises that she is further along in her pregnancy, meaning the child is Ash's. This leaves Tori feeling "insecure and paranoid" about the relationship, as she fears that Ash will want to reunite with Kat. She admits that she is unsure if they have a future together. When Ash and Kat begin spending a lot of time together, Tori becomes suspicious and refuses to believe that they are just discussing the baby. Ash admits that he and Kat do share a secret, but it could put Tori in danger, leading her to end the relationship.

Tori reunites with Ash, but their relationship is soon threatened by Ash's desire to get revenge on Robbo, who he blames for the death of Kat and his unborn son. When Ash learns that Tori has been hiding Robbo, so that he will not harm him, he ends the relationship and refuses to accept that Tori was trying to protect him. Tori helps to save Robbo from prison by getting him psychiatric help, which leaves Ash "fuming". He attacks Robbo, before turning on Tori and "hurling some home truths" at her. Tori's motive for helping Robbo is questioned by her brothers, who think that she may have developed feelings for him, but she assures them she just wants to get him justice. Tori and Ash are brought back together when he is crushed underneath a car he is repairing. She supervises Justin as they help stabilise Ash until the paramedics arrive. Tori is then forced to tell him that lifting the car could kill him, which prompts Ash to admit that he understands why she helped Robbo and that he forgives her.

Ash temporarily leaves the Bay to do "some soul searching". On his return, he appears calmer and he and Tori become closer again. She overhears Ash telling Justin that he regrets losing her, so she pulls Ash in for a kiss. The following day they admit the kiss was a mistake and happened out of habit. As they talk, Ash admits that he returned for her, so they agree to work through their problems from the last few months. Following Mason's decision to leave Home and Away, producers took the decision to split the couple up for good. Ash struggles to deal with his grief over Kat and the baby's deaths, so he purchases a one-way ticket to Cyprus to be with Luc. After hearing that Ash is leaving, Tori "is in denial" and refuses to say goodbye, following their failed attempt at reconciliation. As Ash drives out of the Bay, Tori rushes to catch him and he tells her that she is one of the best things to happen to him. They share one last kiss, before he leaves.

=== IVF and motherhood ===
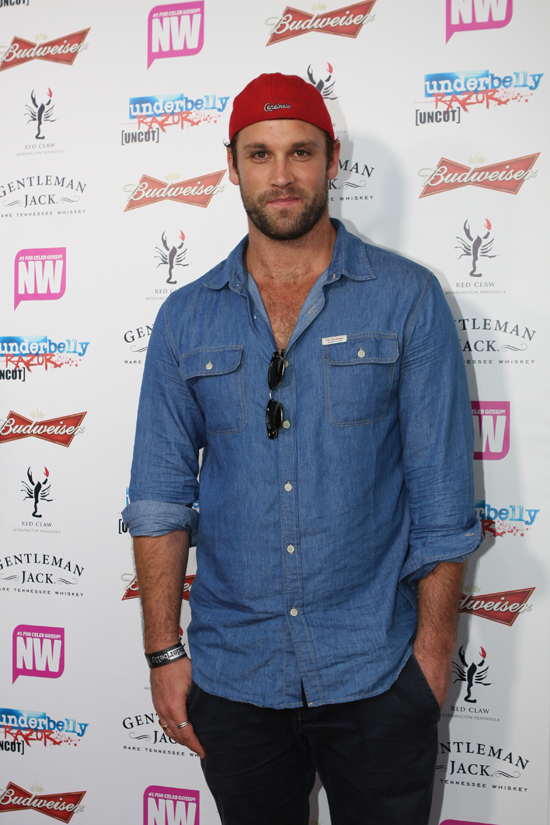
Tori risks her relationship with Ash to help his enemy Robbo (actor Jake Ryan pictured). She later asks Robbo to father her child.

The character was given her first issue-led storyline in 2018, as she decides to undergo fertility treatment to have a child. The arc began shortly after Ash's exit, when Tori suspects she may be pregnant. Realising that she wants to be a mother, Tori decides to use In vitro fertilisation (IVF) and a sperm donor to have a child. Of Tori's decision, McNamee said "Tori has made no secret of the fact that she would love to have children. Ultimately, she assumed, she would find a partner and they would have kids together. However, so far, a long-lasting relationship has evaded her, and so she has only recently started considering IVF." Fertility tests show Tori has low ovarian reserves, meaning she needs to start IVF treatment straight away. McNamee said that Tori is "sad and frustrated" by the news, as it will be harder for her to have children.

After learning that there is a long waiting list for donor sperm at the fertility clinic, Leah suggests that she asks someone she knows to provide a donation. Tori initially dismisses the idea, but she soon reconsiders and asks Robbo, knowing that he will make a good father. Robbo is "stunned" by Tori's request and McNamee told Cullen (TV Week) that Tori has not made "the decision lightly." The situation is complicated by Robbo's burgeoning relationship with Jasmine Delaney (Sam Frost). Tori gives him a chance to back out, knowing that he can have a family with Jasmine, but he wants to honour his agreement with Tori. As the storyline played out on-screen, McNamee announced that she was pregnant with her second child. McNamee said she planned to carry on filming with the show until she was around eight months, and that her pregnancy could be written into Tori's storyline. She also said that she felt "a very strong connection" to her character's story and found it to be both emotional and poignant.

After Tori learns she is pregnant, Robbo becomes over protective of her. He sleeps on the porch of the Morgan's home, continuously calls Tori, and later breaks a window when he does not get a reply to his knocking. Both Tori and Jasmine become concerned by his behaviour. McNamee told Jackie Brygel of New Idea that Tori and Robbo's journey "proves to be more complicated than they anticipated." Tori miscarries the baby, and while she is devastated, she wants to try again as soon as possible. However, Robbo admits that the miscarriage has made him reconsider the idea of having a baby with her and he says that he cannot put himself through it again. Tori secretly undergoes embryo implantation, and is left feeling immense guilt when Robbo and Jasmine announce their engagement. McNamee noted that her character "has always had a very strong moral compass", so she feels bad about what she has done. After confiding in Leah, Tori decides to tell Robbo the truth, but she stops herself at the last moment. McNamee said Tori is wary of Robbo's reaction.

=== Departure and brief return ===
In September 2021, it was confirmed McNamee would be leaving Home and Away that month, along with Ditch Davey who plays Tori's love interest Christian Green. McNamee told Kylie Walters of Who that she felt "'at peace' with her decision" to leave the serial after five years. She explained "I'm not someone who looks backwards. I'm a real believer in everything has its season and leaving the show felt like the end of a season to me. I feel hugely grateful for the amazing time I've had on the show." She also admitted that she would miss "the banter" between cast and crew, as well as Stewart, who she had shared a lot of scenes with. McNamee said it was a gift to play Tori because she was focused on her career, had lost her parents, and had chosen to have a baby on her own. She also said that it was "a challenge to play this complicated woman every day but I loved it, too." McNamee did not think she would have stayed for as long as she did if Tori had spent most of her scenes in The Diner discussing boyfriends. On-screen, Tori and Christian leave the Bay for London shortly after they marry. Of the plot, McNamee commented "Who doesn't love a wedding storyline? It's the perfect send-off for my character. I was definitely holding a few real tears back on the day."

In November 2023, Joshua Haigh of news.com.au reported that McNamee would be reprising her role after she was spotted with other cast members at the show's outdoor filming location. Haigh reported that a viewer spoke with McNamee, who confirmed her character was back for a couple of weeks. Haigh believed she would be returning for Leah and Justin's wedding in 2024. In March 2024, the character's return was confirmed via a promotional trailer for Leah and Justin's wedding.

== Reception ==
For her portrayal of Tori, McNamee received a nomination for the Logie Award for Best New Talent in 2017. The following year, she was included on the longlist for Best Daytime Star at the Inside Soap Awards. TV Week readers voted Tori as their Morgan favourite out of her and Justin. She received 89% of the vote. Shortly after her arrival on UK screens, a Sunday Mail reporter observed that Tori "hasn't been around for long but has already been involved in pretty much everything." They also called Nate "Tori's knight in shining armour" as they got to know each other. Kerry Harvey of Stuff.co.nz commented that the Morgan's arrival "sets off what seems like a never-ending chain of disasters."

Tori's love life in particular has been the subject of critical commentary. Ali Cromarty of TV Week pointed out "The chemistry between Nate and Tori has been sizzling since they met." Sophie Dainty of Digital Spy commented that "it's clear a rather complicated love square could be brewing" between Tori, Nate, Duncan and Danika. A writer for Soap World observed that "the slow-burn romance between Tori and Duncan has been one of the sweetest love affairs that the Summer Bay locals have witnessed in a long time." They also thought it was "a case of like minds meeting" at the right time. During a feature on the top Aussie soap moments of 2016, a TV Soap columnist wrote, "Romance on Home and Away was at fever pitch in 2016 and no one was more aware of that than Tori. The sexy newcomer had both hot doctor Nate and local returnee Duncan fighting for her affections." After Tori chose Nate, the columnist commented that their relationship had "plenty of sexual-tension-fuelled moments." Kerry Harvey (Stuff.co.nz) dubbed the character "unlucky-in-love" and found her relationship with Ash to be "tempestuous".

In February 2018, Daniel Kilkelly of Digital Spy included Ash and Tori's on-off relationship in his feature on "7 soap storylines that are past their sell-by dates". He wrote, "Home and Away is known for endless make-up-then-break-up storylines at the best of times, but no couple has been through the wringer more than Ash and Tori recently. Ever since getting together last year, the pair have endured weekly dramas due to Ash's anger issues and Tori's paranoia that he still has feelings for his old flame Kat (good job she won't have to worry about that for much longer)." Kilkelly bemoaned the fact that he and his colleagues had to regularly write about a "shock split" for the couple during their weekly spoilers, and asked the producers to "either break them up for good or give them at least two weeks of happiness!"

In November 2021, three critics for The West Australian placed Tori at number 45 in their feature on the "Top 50 heroes we love and villains we hate" from Home and Away. Of the character, they wrote: "An overachiever in almost every way, Tori has been through a fair amount of tragedy. A single mother and successful doctor who runs the ED at the local hospital, she has been involved in a plane crash and had a baby via IVF with Robbo (Jake Ryan). Recently she was jilted at the altar by Christian Green (Ditch Davey), but took him back because the options are somewhat limited in Summer Bay."
