= Blampied =

Blampied may refer to:

Places:

- Blampied, Victoria, town in the central highlands of Victoria on the Midland Highway

Surname:

- Edmund Blampied (1886–1966), one of the most eminent artists to come from the Channel Islands
- Katie Blampied or Katie Ritchie, retired netball player as well as international rower and triathlete from New Zealand
- Rachael Blampied, played Bree Hamilton on the New Zealand soap opera Shortland Street from December 2011 to September 2012

Fiction:

- Rev. John Sylvester Blampied, character in Random Harvest by James Hilton
