= Justin Morgan (Home and Away) =

- Home and Away character
- Portrayed by: James Stewart
- Duration: 2016–present
- First appearance: 7 June 2016
- Introduced by: Lucy Addario
In-universe information
- Other names: Jack Lee (birth name)
- Occupation: Mechanic; Summer Bay Auto owner
- Father: Koby Lee
- Mother: Kate Lee
- Brothers: Brody Morgan; Mason Morgan
- Sisters: Tori Morgan
- Half-sisters: Raffy Morrison
- Wife: Leah Patterson (2024–)
- Daughters: Ava Gilbert
- Nieces: Grace Morgan

Justin Morgan is a fictional character from the Australian television soap opera Home and Away, played by James Stewart. The actor was contacted by his agent and the head of drama at Seven Network about the role. After hearing their pitch, Stewart auditioned and won the part. He began filming in December 2015, and made his first appearance during the episode broadcast on 7 June 2016. Justin was introduced to the show along with his three siblings; Tori Morgan (Penny McNamee), Brody Morgan (Jackson Heywood) and Mason Morgan (Orpheus Pledger). The family received immediate comparisons to the show's popular Braxton brothers.

Justin is portrayed as an impulsive, aggressive, "all-round typical Aussie bloke". He takes his role as head of the family seriously and is very protective of his siblings. The character's early storylines saw him clash with Martin Ashford (George Mason) and help save the life of Summer Bay stalwart Alf Stewart (Ray Meagher). The Morgans are soon revealed to be in witness protection, following the murders of their parents by a drugs syndicate, who start targeting the siblings. The storyline saw the family held hostage, threatened, and involved in a plane crash. Justin is later shot at and stabbed by corrupt police officer Ranae Turner (Sacha Horler).

During the witness protection storyline, Justin is reunited with his daughter Ava Gilbert (Grace Thomas), and he develops a relationship with Phoebe Nicholson (Isabella Giovinazzo), to whom he later becomes engaged. Following Giovinazzo's decision to leave the show, the couple break up when Phoebe leaves to pursue her music career in the United States. The character is then involved in an on/off relationship with Scarlett Snow (Tania Nolan). Later storylines have seen Justin begin a relationship with Willow Harris (Sarah Roberts), endure Ava's kidnapping, and targeted in a revenge campaign by Ebony Harding (Cariba Heine). For his portrayal of Justin, Stewart has received nominations for Best Daytime Star at the Inside Soap Awards and Most Popular Actor at the Logie Awards. The character was branded "the Morgan trouble magnet" by a critic for Soaplife.

== Casting ==
On 5 December 2015, Jonathon Moran from The Daily Telegraph reported that James Stewart had joined the cast of Home and Away as Justin Morgan, alongside actors Jackson Heywood and Orpheus Pledger who play his brothers Brody and Mason Morgan respectively. All three began filming their first scenes during the following week, ahead of their on-screen debut in 2016. Stewart was contacted by his agent and Julie McGauran, the head of drama at Seven Network, about a role in the show. After hearing the pitch, Stewart accepted the audition. Home and Away marks Stewart's second television appearance since he took time away from acting to be a stay-at-home dad. He commented, "I got to the end of three years of raising my daughter and just thought, 'Oh, I need to work. I've got to get her through school.'" New Zealand actor Benedict Wall also auditioned for the role of Justin, before he was later cast as Duncan Stewart. Stewart made his first appearance as Justin on 7 June 2016, alongside Heywood and Pledger.

== Development ==
=== Characterisation ===
Ahead of his screen debut, Stewart said his character's biggest strengths are "his love for his family and the lengths he'll go to, to protect them from their past." He also described Justin as being "impulsive and aggressive", and having an "alpha mentality". Justin is a mechanic and an "all-round typical Aussie bloke" who enjoys sports and "a good laugh." Stewart insisted that Justin was not a "bad boy" character, as had been suggested by various articles about the Morgans. He also joked that Justin likes to think he is good with women.

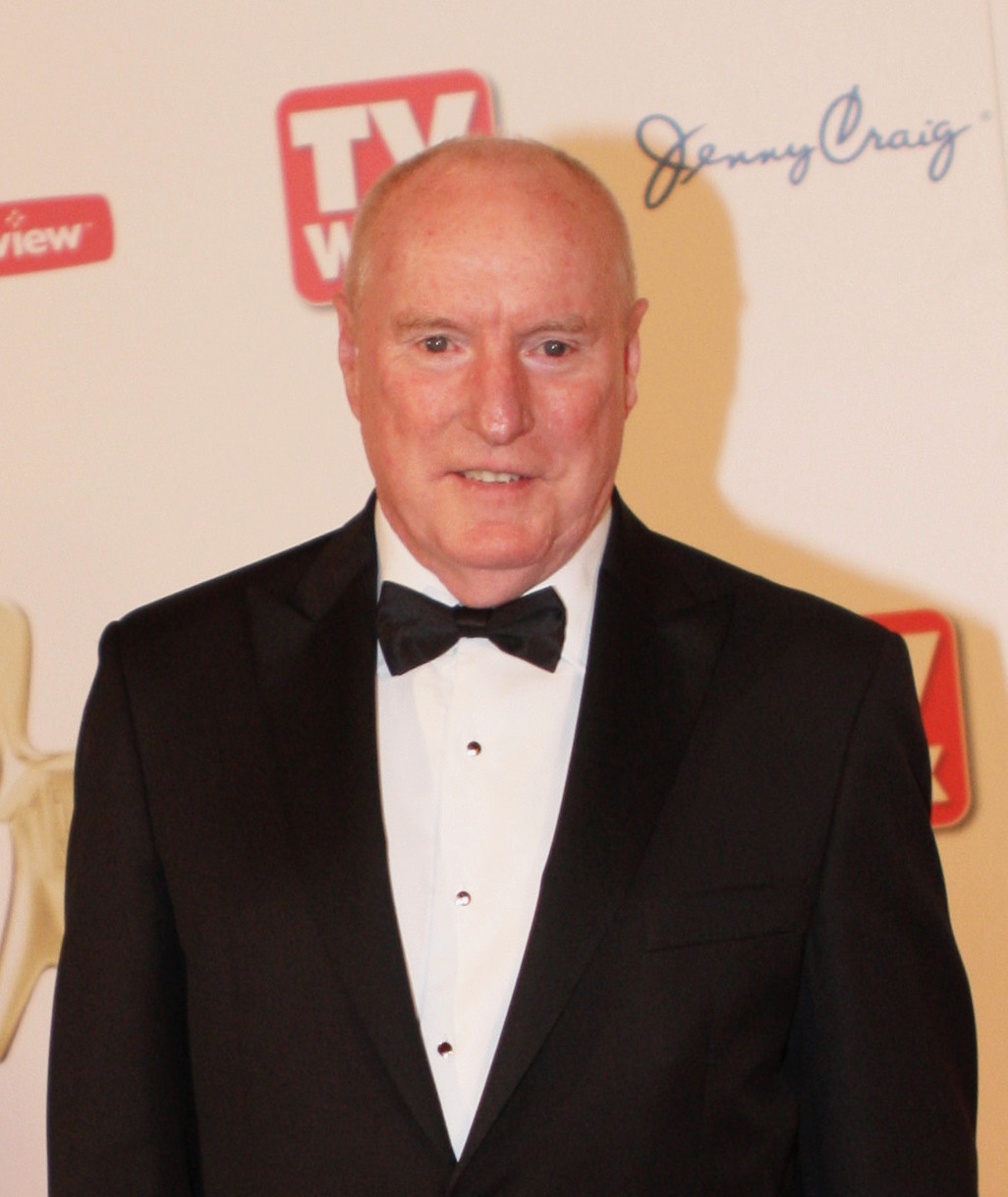
Justin bonds with and later helps save the life of Alf Stewart, played by Ray Meagher (pictured).

Justin takes his role as the head of the family "very seriously". Along with Tori, he helped raise their younger brothers Brody and Mason. As a result he is "fiercely protective of them." Stewart explained that Justin makes all the decisions on behalf of the family, but he often discusses them with Tori. Justin does not want to get too settled in the Bay, and he worries what the town's residents will think of his family. Stewart liked being part of a family and compared it to his role on Packed to the Rafters, where he was "an outsider brought in." He also found that as the older brother and not the father, there were different dynamics at play. Stewart told Vanessa Williams of The West Australian that he fell in love with the Morgans from the moment they were pitched to him.

The Morgan brothers drew immediate comparisons to the show's Braxton brothers, who were introduced in 2011. Stewart commented, "Creating this family is probably more our priority than taking over the Brax boys. How do you take on Steve Peacocke (Brax)? I hope Australia is ready for it, it is the way it is." Heywood thought the Morgans had "a very different dynamic" to the Braxtons. Stewart agreed, saying that the families were "from completely different worlds".

=== Introduction ===
Justin is driving his brothers to Summer Bay to meet up with their sister Tori, when they are almost involved in a car crash with Martin "Ash" Ashford (George Mason), who swerves across the road. Neither Justin or Ash are willing to back down when they come face to face. Mason admitted that Ash knows he is in the wrong, but he thinks Justin is "a hothead". Brody and Mason stop Justin and Ash from getting into a physical fight, and the brothers continue their journey to the Bay, where they later come across Tori talking with Ash and Alf Stewart (Ray Meagher) on the beach. Before another fight between Justin and Ash breaks out, Tori defuses the situation by revealing that Justin, Brody and Mason are her brothers. Justin is glad that his family made it to the Bay safely. Stewart told Stephen Downie of TV Week, "It's not so much that Justin is angry at Ash because he was an idiot. It's that he almost killed the one thing he's been trying to look after." Tori warns Justin about his run in with Ash and they wonder if they will be able to stay in their new home this time.

Tori secures Justin a job as a deck hand with Alf. Justin is initially annoyed that his sister interfered in his life, but when he gets out on Alf's boat, The Blaxland, he eventually sees that the job is a good opportunity for him. Stewart commented, "Justin is reluctant to go on the boat with Alf in the first place. But once he's there, he does start to enjoy it." Justin bonds with Alf over their shared love of the water and the fact they each have "bossy" sisters. While they are out on the water, the boat breaks down and Justin struggles to fix it. Alf then starts having chest pains and he collapses when he suffers a heart attack. When he realises there is no phone signal, Justin jumps in the water and swims to the shore to fetch help. Stewart called his character "an accidental hero".

=== Witness protection secret ===
Upon their introduction, an Inside Soap columnist stated that the Morgans appeared to live a normal life, but they had "a dangerous past" and no one was allowed to know who they really were. The family initially keep to themselves, and Justin warns Tori against befriending local doctor Nate Cooper (Kyle Pryor). He is worried when she admits to telling Nate that their parents are dead, as he does not want Nate looking into it. Stewart explained, "There are a set of rules the Morgans have to live by, which relate to their secret. If Justin has to live by them, then so does the rest of the house." When Mason's former girlfriend Lara Adams (Elle Harris) visits him, Justin asks her to leave. But when she returns, Mason tells her that his family are in witness protection. Brody later reveals that he is being followed, and when Mason says that he spoke to Lara, Justin feels that the family need to leave the Bay.

Guest character Spike Lowe (Jason Montgomery) was soon introduced to the storyline. He drugs Nate, before going to the Morgan's house and threatening Tori. Justin arrives home soon after and Tori worries that he might put them in more danger, as she knows he is "a hothead." McNamee commented, "she's trying to keep Justin calm and make sure he doesn't do anything irrational to escalate the situation." The family are soon moved to a safe house by their police liaison officer Atticus Decker (John Adam). They agree that they are tired of running from the drugs syndicate who killed their parents. While Brody, Justin and Tori are arguing, Mason leaves the house to meet Lara, who has been working for Spike and Blaine Varden (Ashley Lyons), the man who killed the siblings' parents. Spike and Blaine trick Mason into telling them the location of the safe house and they hold the family hostage at gunpoint. As Blaine threatens to kill them, he reveals that Justin played a part in their parents' deaths.

Spike later returns to the Bay to confront Justin about his father's book. He threatens both Justin and Phoebe Nicholson (Isabella Giovinazzo), warning them that the Morgans will die. Stewart explained to Ali Cromarty of TV Week that Justin was "heavily involved" with his father's activities, but he has no idea what book Spike is talking about. Spike forces Justin and Phoebe to search through several boxes of the Morgan's belongings, and Justin worries about Phoebe's safety. Stewart stated, Justin knows he needs to get the precious cargo, Phoebe, out of the way. But, they both don't want to detach. She desperately wants to help Justin and Justin doesn't want to lose her." Spike eventually leaves, but not before warning Justin that if he goes to the police, his family will be in danger. Justin and Phoebe continue looking through the boxes and they find a clue that helps them locate the book.

The scriptwriters later devised a large stunt storyline involving a plane crash. Justin receives a warning from Spike that he has sabotaged the private plane Duncan Stewart (Benedict Wall) has chartered for Tori's birthday trip. Justin gets to the airport just as the flight takes off, and he attempts to chase it down the runway. Stewart spent most of the day filming the chase sequence, and it took nine times to get the scene right. Stewart said he had plenty of rest in between, as it took a long time to turn the plane back around. Justin breaks into the radio room and tries to contact Duncan. However, the passengers are passing out from carbon dioxide leaking into the cabin, and he struggles to get the coordinates. After receiving an incoherent response from Duncan, Justin contacts the police for backup. Stewart told Ellis (Inside Soap) that Justin initially thinks he can do it all by himself, but he soon realises he needs help. The actor also said, "Until he has an answer, there is always a moment of hope. But he's also prepared for the worst happening, too." Duncan manages to crash land the plane in the bush, and everyone survives.

Decker gives Justin an address for his nieces Hope (Jessica Falkholt) and Raffy Morrison (Olivia Deeble), who are unsure why their uncle sent Justin to their house. They are then set upon by Spike and his associates, who attempt to kidnap Hope and Raffy. Constable Kat Chapman (Pia Miller) and Ash, who have followed Justin, manage to rescue Raffy, but Spike drives off with Hope. Kat allows Raffy to stay with her, as she has no one else. The Morgans later learn Raffy is Decker's daughter and their half-sister. Decker is later shot to death and Superintendent Ranae Turner (Sacha Horler) is assigned to their case. Both Justin and Kat are suspicious of her and they later learn that she is working for the drugs syndicate. Justin tells his family that they have to leave town quickly. When Kat comes to collect him, they are both shot at by Ranae, who then follows them through the town. Justin is captured when he returns home to collect a USB stick containing evidence against the syndicate. Ranae ties Justin up and she tells him that she ordered the hit on his father. Justin is "devastated" by the revelation and screams at Ranae to shoot him, but Kat soon arrives with back up.

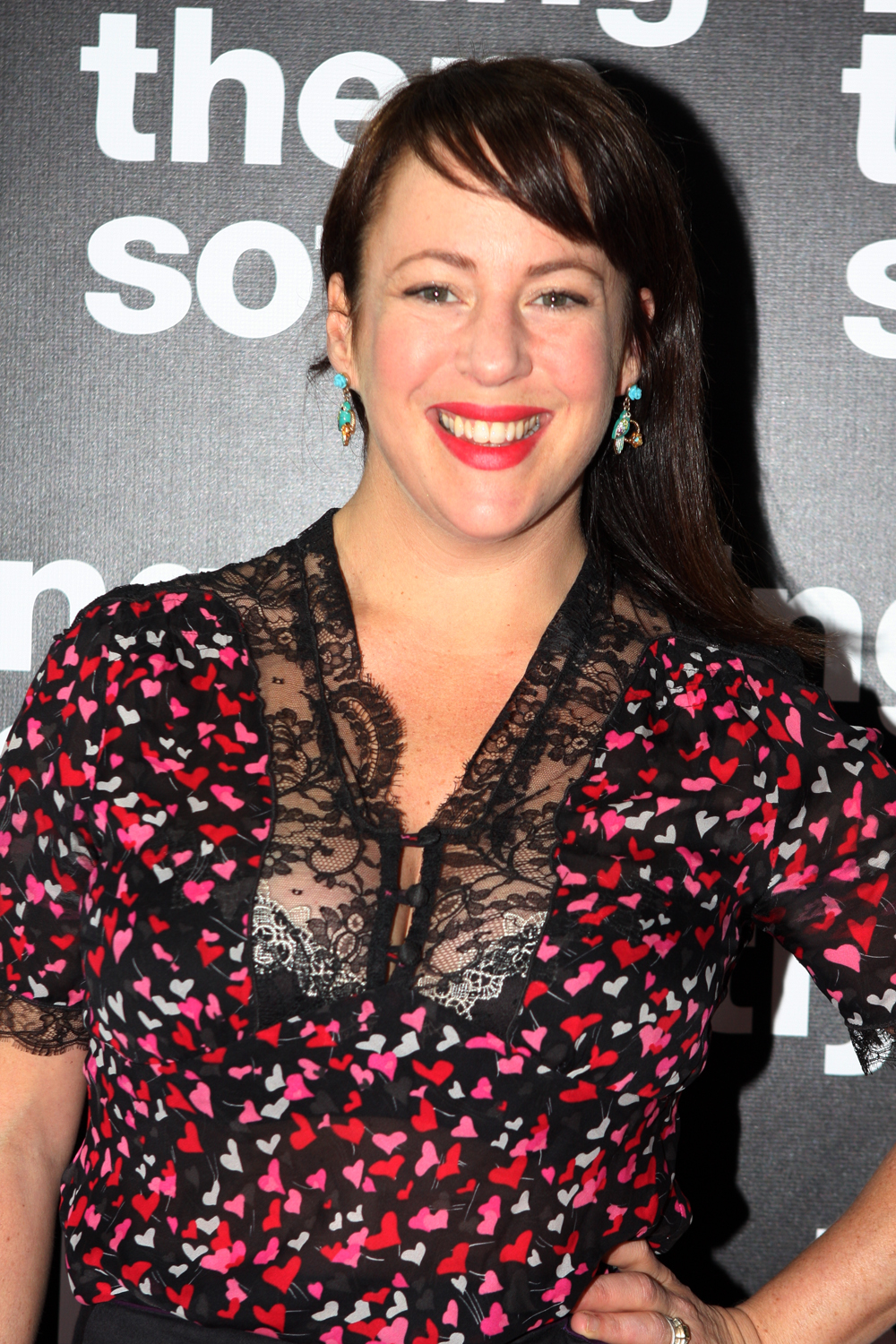
The Morgan's are targeted by corrupt police officer Ranae Turner, played by Sacha Horler (pictured). Ranae later escapes jail and stabs Justin.

Ranae and the rest of the drugs syndicate go on trial for their various crimes. Justin gives evidence in court and the members are sentenced to jail. The Morgans "breathe a huge sigh of relief" as they realise that they are finally free of witness protection. They also decide to keep their assigned identities instead of returning to their old names. Daniel Kilkelly of Digital Spy pointed out "sudden name changes might confuse fans..." Seven months after their arrival, the Morgan's witness protection secret is revealed to the rest of the Bay in the Coastal News.

=== Stabbing ===
The show's 2016 season finale concludes with Ranae stabbing Justin. Ranae manages to escape house arrest using her police contacts and plans to end the Morgans. She has Tori kidnapped and brought to her location. Ranae then makes a "sinister" call to Justin and he rushes off to save Tori. Both siblings are scared as Ranae threatens to kill them both, before going after Brody and Mason. McNamee stated, "This is high stakes for Tori and Justin – the syndicate murdered their parents, and they're prepared to kill again." Justin and Tori manages to free themselves and escape, but just when they think they are in the clear, Ranae emerges and stabs Justin in the stomach. Justin slumps to the ground, as Tori attempts to save him.

When the show resumed in January 2017, Tori was seen calling an ambulance for Justin, as Ranae and her associates drive off. Justin is rushed to the hospital in a serious condition, as he has lost a lot of blood. Tori knows that he needs to go into surgery, but Nate is busy with another patient, so she realises that she will have to operate on her own brother. Producers then introduced new surgeon and Tori's former boyfriend, Riley Hawkins (Ryan O'Kane), to the storyline, as he steps in to perform the operation. As Justin recovers at home, Brody encourages Justin to show Phoebe how much he loves her, as their relationship is suffering. Justin prepares a meal for them and sets up a table in the garden, onto which he places a jewellery box. However, before Phoebe comes over, Justin starts to feel unwell and he collapses in the garden. Tori finds an unconscious Justin and calls him an ambulance.

=== Relationships ===
==== Phoebe Nicholson ====
The character was given an immediate love interest in the form of established regular Phoebe Nicholson. While Justin is out walking the family dog Buddy, he meets and "sweet-talks" Phoebe. They then have a one-night stand. Stewart said that Justin falls for Phoebe, as she is "cool, fun and she's also super-attractive." The pair's relationship is tested when Phoebe becomes involved in the Morgan's witness protection secret, and Justin's brother, Brody, becomes attracted to Phoebe. But Justin is sure that Phoebe feels that same way about him as he does about her. Stewart commented, "Phoebe keeps doing things that make him know she digs him." Phoebe and Justin continue to spend time together. When Phoebe is feeling down after being carjacked, Justin helps to cheer her up by singing to her at Salt. Phoebe then joins Justin on stage to continue the song together. Of her character's attraction to Justin, Giovinazzo said, "Phoebe can't deny that she has strong and deep feelings for Justin. They're just drawn to each other." The couple later share a kiss, and an Inside Soap columnist pointed out that they were "totally loved up." However, as Justin and his family are being targeted by criminals, Giovinazzo said Phoebe had to be smart about the situation, which meant possibly putting their relationship on hold.

Phoebe later admits to Justin that she is in love with him, but he finds that he cannot commit to her because of the threat against his family. Producers tested the relationship again by introducing Justin's estranged daughter Ava Gilbert (Grace Thomas), who he had to give up when he went into witness protection. After Justin is reunited with Ava, he comes to Phoebe and "breaks down" after Ava's mother Nina Gilbert (Zoe Naylor) bans him from seeing her. Justin makes a "spontaneous" proposal of marriage to Phoebe, who reacts badly and questions whether they want different things in life. Phoebe also admits that she has been hurt by the breakdown of her parents' marriage. Justin makes it clear that he wants to be with her for the rest of his life. Stewart explained that Justin had not been in a relationship with one person for as long as he had been with Phoebe, and he likes that she gets along with his family. He also said that Justin has "never felt like this about a girl". Justin attempts to tell Phoebe how he feels and he makes a speech "from the heart", which causes her to change her mind and accept his proposal.

When Giovinazzo decided to leave Home and Away, producers devised a break up for Phoebe and Justin. Phoebe's friend Donna Fields (Melissa Bonne) invites her to join a tour in the United States, and Justin plans to go with her. However, when he learns Brody is at the police station due to another incident involving his drug addiction, Justin realises he cannot leave the Bay. He and Phoebe say "a heartfelt goodbye" before she leaves. On her return, Phoebe tells Justin that she has been asked to take part in a year-long tour and Justin is determined to go with her this time. Shortly after, he is reunited with his daughter Ava and he finds the thought of leaving her again hard to deal with. Stewart told Sarah Ellis of Inside Soap that having Ava back in his life "means everything" to Justin, and when she calls him "dad" for the first time, it really affects him. During a farewell party for the couple, Justin sings a ballad for Ava, which makes Phoebe realise that she cannot separate them. Phoebe believes she and Justin can have a long-distance relationship, but Justin breaks up with her instead. Of the moment, Stewart commented "By the time Phoebe says she's going without him, Justin has come to terms with it in his heart. He doesn't want to anchor her – so he sets her free."

==== Scarlett Snow ====
"I do think they'd make a good couple – they're like Beauty and the Beast! The viewers are really warming to Justin and Scarlett, but we'll just have to wait and see if they can make it as a couple."

— Stewart on Justin and Scarlett's relationship.

In May 2017, producers introduced guest character Scarlett Snow (Tania Nolan) into Brody's drug addiction storyline. Scarlett also becomes a new love interest for Justin. After Scarlett is carjacked by Brody, she attempts to help him, along with the Morgans. When Scarlett becomes suspicious that Brody is still using, she searches his car and finds his stash of drugs. She and Justin confront Brody, who launches himself at Scarlett and Justin has to hold him back. Brody later steals money and jewellery from Scarlett. Various obstacles stop Scarlett and Justin from dating. Her estranged husband Caleb Snow (Josh McConville) sends a private investigator to find her, prompting Justin to get her out of the Bay for a while.

Upon her return, Scarlett gets drunk as she struggles to deal with the anniversary of her son's death, leading Justin to walk her home. She "drunkenly flirts" with him and wakes up in his bed the following morning. Scarlett fears that she and Justin had a one-night stand, but Justin "embarrassingly" has to assure her that he just brought her back to his house to sleep off the alcohol. Justin grows closer to Scarlett, as she continues to help out with Brody. When she convinces him to sell his restaurant to fund a private rehab, Justin is "delighted" and makes his gratitude known. Scarlett then goes to kiss him, but Justin pulls away and asks her to leave. After spending the day together, the pair almost have sex. But Justin calls out Phoebe's name and then passes out on Scarlett's bed from too much alcohol. Scarlett later tells him that they should just be friends.

Scarlett eventually agrees to go on a proper date with Justin, who organises a picnic on a remote beach in the Bay. Stewart explained that Justin is nervous, but he was also ready to go on the date. He continued, "After all their trials and tribulations, he's keen to start off on the right foot." The date starts off well, and the couple spend time swimming in the water, however, Justin dives in for a last swim and fails to resurface. Stewart described the situation as "life-threatening". Scarlett pulls Justin from the water and starts to give him CPR, but it brings up memories of her attempt to revive her son. As Nolan's guest stint came to an end, producers implemented a break up for the couple. Scarlett spends time with her husband, leading Justin to realise that she is still in love with Caleb. Justin knows that their relationship cannot work and he refuses to be "the other man". Scarlett leaves the Bay with Caleb to work on their marriage, leaving Justin "heartbroken".

==== Willow Harris ====
In late 2017, a new love interest for the character was introduced in the form of Willow Harris (Sarah Roberts). The pair do not get off to a good start, as Willow attacks Justin. When she pulls up to the garage on a motorbike, Justin attempts to "charm her", but Willow hits him with her helmet and then ties him to a workbench. Willow demands Justin tells her where her money is, but he explains that he gave it to the police. Willow leaves him in the garage overnight, and returns in the morning to taunt him and explain that the money does not actually belong to her. She leaves when Ash and Ziggy Astoni (Sophie Dillman) turn up for work. Johnathon Hughes of the Radio Times observed that Willow seemed to "have made an impression" on Justin, as he does not want to report her to the police. Willow then kidnaps Buddy. When Justin tracks her down, he stops her from getting beaten by Boyd Easton (Steve Le Marquand). Willow accuses him of making the situation worse. Hughes thought their meeting would lead to romance, saying "an attraction develops between them".

After learning that Boyd has put Willow's father in the hospital, Justin decides to meet with him and his gang. Stewart told Ellis (Inside Soap) that Justin "is becoming quite protective of Willow." Justin traps Boyd by recording their meeting and endures a beating in a bid to get evidence against him. Justin then reports Boyd to the police. Willow makes it clear that she is not grateful for his interference. Willow then moves to the Bay. Stewart commented that Justin is "thrilled" by the development, but he does not want Willow knowing that. Justin helps Willow gain employment at the local gym and as she is thanking him, they kiss. Willow and Justin have sex, but when he attempts to ask where their relationship is going, she throws him out of her caravan. Willow admits that she only wants a casual relationship, but she knows Justin wants more and they end up having sex again. As the storyline between their characters played out on-screen, Stewart and Roberts developed a relationship off-screen.

Producers soon tested the relationship with the introduction of Willow's former boyfriend Dean Thompson (Patrick O'Connor). Dean is a member of the show's fictional criminal gang The River Boys, with which Willow also has connections. After a romantic meal at Salt, Willow and Justin return to her caravan to find a naked Dean in Willow's bed. After throwing him out, Willow explains that she and Dean are old friends and she did not know that he would be there, but Justin has his doubts about her explanation. The scriptwriters created further problems for the couple by reintroducing Justin's daughter, Ava. Willow is unaware Justin is a father, until Ava and her mother Nina arrive in the Bay. As Willow deals with the revelation, Nina "drops another bombshell" as she wants Justin to look after Ava for a month. Willow bonds with Ava, and Justin feels comfortable enough to leave them alone together. However, when he returns home he finds his daughter boiling water and using knives as she helps with dinner. Willow leaves due to Justin's "ferocious reaction" and tells Dean that she think Justin overreacted. Dean takes advantage of the rift between the couple, telling Willow that Justin does not respect her. When Justin apologises, Willow is "defensive" due to Dean's words.

Writers devised a break up for the couple following Ava's kidnapping. Willow ends the relationship, so Nina will continue to let Justin have access to Ava. Roberts said her character is "devastated" about the break up. But instead of telling Justin why she ended things between them, Willow kisses Dean, so Justin will move on. Justin "is gutted" by the stunt and accepts the relationship is over. Roberts believed Willow was more suited to Justin, saying "She came to Summer Bay to straighten her life out, and Justin was a perfect match for that reason!" Weeks later, Dean informs Justin that Willow has a gambling problem and needs his help. Justin starts by booking Willow into a motel and staying with her. Willow goes into "full meltdown mode" when Justin prevents her from placing a bet on a winning horse. Willow then informs Justin that she started gambling because of him, so he asks Tori to speak with her.

==== Leah Patterson ====
In April 2019, writers established a casual relationship between Justin and Leah Patterson (Ada Nicodemou). The storyline begins with Leah offering her advice to Justin about his various family issues, before they end up kissing and spending the night together. The following day, they agree that it was just a bit of fun, but they soon have sex again. Nicodemou admitted that she was surprised by the development, as the characters had not had not shared many scenes or storylines, but she thought that it made sense. She explained, "Leah and Justin are a similar age and they're the ones who always seem to look after everyone else. But I think they've also both got to a stage in their lives where they need a friend to chat to and are ready to have a bit of fun." Stewart agreed that they shared similarities, and he thought that it was an "obvious move" getting the two characters together. He also believed a moment from the previous year, in which a drunk Justin made a romantic advance towards Leah, was the producers' "testing the waters" for the relationship. As Leah and Justin spend another evening together, Stewart told TV Week's Maddison Hockey that "It very well could be the start of something. Justin doesn't want to seem too keen, but he definitely wants it to happen again." Returning home, Justin faces questions from Mason and gives an unconvincing excuse. Hockey questioned how long Justin and Leah can keep their relationship a secret.

Leah and Justin eventually get engaged and are married during the episode broadcast on 9 April 2024.

=== Daughter's kidnapping ===
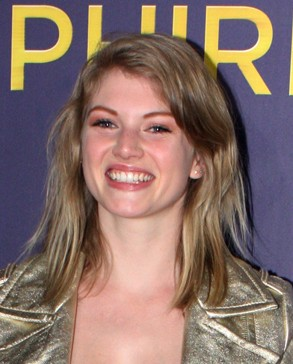
Ebony Harding, played by Cariba Heine (pictured), gets revenge on those involved in her brother, Boyd's death.

After Justin is forced to testify in court instead of taking Ava surfing, he wakes the following morning to find that she has gone missing. Justin is "panicked" by his daughter's disappearance and believes it is his fault. Stewart explained, "When Justin realises Ava is not in the house, he goes straight into panic mode. As any normal parent would, but the panic slowly increases, hour by hour." As Justin goes to the police, Willow tries to reassure Justin that Ava has gone off on her own before, but he starts to "freak out". Justin soon receives a ransom demand of $25,000 for Ava's safe return. The family discuss paying the ransom without the involvement of the police, but Raffy worries about Justin's safety and goes to the police herself.

As Justin meets with an older woman called Hazel (Genevieve Lemon), the police turn up and scare her off. Justin is "fuming" with Raffy. Willow soon realises that Hazel is Boyd Easton's mother and that Ava's kidnapping is her fault. The ransom exchange is reorganised and Willow accompanies Justin, along with Dean and Constable Colby Thorne (Tim Franklin). Willow gives Boyd the money and Ava is returned to Justin. However, Dean fights with Boyd, who then drives his car at Dean. Colby shoots Boyd and he dies in the hospital. Hazel and her daughter Ebony Harding (Cariba Heine) vow revenge on everyone who played a part in Boyd's death. When Nina returns to the Bay, she demands to know why Ava was kidnapped. Justin attempts to explain, but a "furious" Nina decides to take Ava home and tells Justin that he is an unfit father. The incident eventually leads to Justin and Willow's break up, as Nina tells her that if they are together, then Justin cannot see Ava.

Meanwhile, Ebony focuses the first stage of her revenge campaign on Justin. Ebony brings her car to Summer Bay Auto to be fixed, and notices that Dean and Ziggy are the only two employees present. Upon her return, she forces Ziggy into handing over the car before Justin has signed off on the work. Ebony then stages an accident by crashing her car into a tree and cutting the brakes. As she is taken to hospital, Ebony makes it known to the police that she blames the garage for being "careless". An inspector from fair trading closes the garage as an investigation into their work practices takes place. Ebony blackmails Justin into paying her $30,000 to keep the case out of court. She also accepts a job as a waitress at his brother's restaurant.

== Reception ==
For his portrayal of Justin, Stewart was nominated for Best Actor at the Digital Spy Reader Awards; he received 1% of the total vote. He was longlisted for Best Daytime Star at the 2017 Inside Soap Awards. The following year, Justin and Willow received a nomination for Best Soap Couple at the Digital Spy Reader Awards; they came in last place with 1% of the total vote. In 2023, Stewart earned a nomination for the Logie Award for Most Popular Actor. In 2025, Justin and Leah received a Best Soap Couple nomination at the Digital Spy Reader Awards. Stewart was longlisted for "Best Actor" at the 2026 Inside Soap Awards.

Ali Cromarty and Stephen Downie of TV Week were impressed by the new brothers, commenting, "Move over Braxtons, there's a new family of hot brothers in Summer Bay." They also branded them "loyal, caring and hard-working". Daniel Kilkelly of Digital Spy dubbed the Morgans "Summer Bay's unluckiest family". He later included their witness protection storyline in his list of "soap storylines past their sell-by dates". Kilkelly reiterated that the Morgans were "the unluckiest family in Summer Bay history". He bemoaned the constant stream of villains that arrived in the Bay and the dangerous situations the family found themselves in. Kilkelly added, "Seriously, Summer Bay bosses, make it stop! Either kill the lot of them off, or let them go at least a week without being kidnapped or shot at..."

When Justin survived being stabbed, Kilkelly commented that he proved "his resilience yet again". A South Wales Echo reporter criticised Justin's actions before his collapse, stating "If you're on the mend and planning a romantic dinner, don't rush things or you could jeopardise your recuperation. That's a lesson Justin could do with learning as he romances Phoebe this week. The poor bloke's only gone and got a post-operative infection". Claire Crick from Soaplife branded the character "the Morgan trouble magnet". Crick later dubbed Justin "something of a knight in shining armour."

Justin's romantic relationships have attracted commentary from critics. A writer for TV Week noted, "They're on. They're off. It's hard to keep up with Justin and Phoebe's relationship." Ali Cromarty of the same publication observed "ever since they first locked eyes, the chemistry between Justin and Phoebe has been palpable." Of Phoebe's temporary departure, a New Idea columnist commented "It may be just for a week, but things have a tendency of falling apart for these two lovebirds faster than you can say 'flamin' galah'!"

Johnathon Hughes of the Radio Times thought "the chemistry is evident" between Justin and Scarlett, and added "surely it can't be long before they end up in bed for real?" When the couple went on their first date, Inside Soap's Sarah Ellis said "it's about time! The pair have been dancing around their feelings for each other for weeks, leaving us shouting at our screens in frustration." A writer for TVNZ listed seven reasons why the characters should be together, stating "They could be Home and Away's new golden couple, if they'd both just get over themselves and admit it." The reasons included their attraction to one another, their shared interests, and their initial dislike of each other, which the writer said was a "classic giveaway". They added that Justin and Scarlett would "make a beautiful couple."

In November 2021, three critics for The West Australian placed Justin at number 31 in their feature on the "Top 50 heroes we love and villains we hate" from Home and Away from the past 30 years. Of the character, they wrote: "Ex-Packed to the Rafters star James Stewart is one of Summer Bay's most popular residents. Fiercely protective of his brood, Justin's a trouble magnet and has been embroiled in some fairly spectacular scrapes, stoushes and scandals over the years." Chloe Timms from Inside Soap believed that Leah and Justin were "meant to be".
