= Benedict Wall =

New Zealand actor

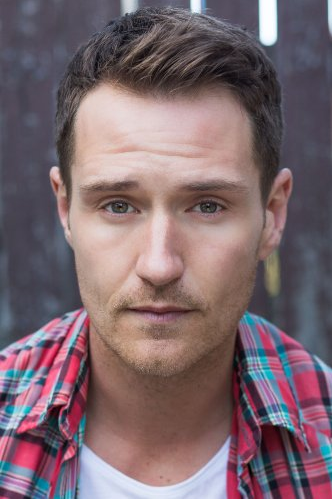
- Wall in July 2017
- Born: 17 June; Auckland, New Zealand
- Occupation: Actor
- Years active: 2007–present
- Spouse: Jessica Grace Smith (m. 2020)

Benedict Wall (born 17 June) is a New Zealand film, theatre and television actor. From 2011, Wall played Owen Sutherland in the New Zealand soap opera Shortland Street. He has also appeared in Outrageous Fortune, Underbelly: Badness, Breaker Morant: The Retrial and Pirates of the Airwaves. Wall co-wrote and directed the short film Best Mates. In 2016, he took over the role of Duncan Stewart in the Australian soap opera Home and Away. He also appeared in the Network Ten miniseries Brock.

== Early and personal life ==
Wall was born in Auckland and grew up in Wellington. Wall spent three years completing a bachelor's degree in journalism. Six months after graduating, he decided to pursue a career in acting and won a scholarship to the Neighborhood Playhouse School of the Theatre in New York City.

Wall has been in a relationship with actress Jessica Grace Smith since 2010. The couple live in Sydney. Wall and Smith got engaged in November 2019, and they married in New Zealand on 8 February 2020. In July 2021, they announced they were expecting their first child.

== Career ==
Wall played Ben on Outrageous Fortune in 2007. He also had roles in The Amazing Extraordinary Friends, Reckless Behavior: Caught on Tape and John Safran's Race Relations. In 2011, Wall received an audition for the medical soap opera Shortland Street and he was cast in the recurring role of ED consultant Owen Sutherland. The following year, he starred in the short film Ten Thousand Days, alongside Morgana O'Reilly. He also made a guest appearance in Underbelly: Badness.

Wall portrayed Breaker Morant in Breaker Morant: The Retrial, a television documentary filmed in Charters Towers. He starred as pirate radio host Rick Grant in the 2014 docudrama Pirates of the Airwaves, which tells the story of the founding of Radio Hauraki. The following year, he appeared in James Raue's low budget feature film Psychoanalysis. He was also cast in the Australian feature film The Pretend One, alongside Geraldine Hakewill and David Field. The film was shot in Queensland and released in 2016.

Wall and fellow actor Tai Hara co-wrote the black comedy film Best Mates. Wall also directed and acted in the short, alongside Hara and Jessica Grace Smith. Best Mates received a nomination for Best Live Action Short Film at the Santa Barbara International Film Festival.

In 2016, Wall took over the role of Duncan Stewart in Home and Away. The character had not been part of the show for ten years. Wall had auditioned for Home and Away several times before he was cast as Duncan. He received a recall for the part of Martin Ashford, and he also auditioned for the role of Justin Morgan. In the same year, Wall appeared in the miniseries Brock as Tony Roberts. Wall plays the role of Jones in 2020 television drama Operation Buffalo, a friend of Major Leo Carmichael played by Ewen Leslie.

== Filmography ==
Year	Title	Role	Notes
2007	The Amazing Extraordinary Friends	Damon	Episode: "Captain X-posed"
2007	Reckless Behavior: Caught on Tape	Cliff	
2007	Outrageous Fortune	Ben	Episode: "What Did You Enact?"
2008	Jinx Sister	Faceless Lover	
2009	John Safran's Race Relations	Jeremy Weinstein	
2011	Shortland Street	Owen Sutherland	
2012	Ten Thousand Days	Darby	Short film
2012	Underbelly: Badness	Ben Dokic	
2013	Breaker Morant: The Retrial	Breaker Morant	
2014	Pirates of the Airwaves	Rick Grant	
2015	Psychoanalysis	Paul Symmonds	
2015	Ready for This	Officer Waters	Episode: "A Wonderful Day"
2016	Best Mates	Dom	Also co-writer and director
2016	Brock	Tony Roberts	
2016	Home and Away	Duncan Stewart	
2016	The Pretend One	Guy	
2017	James Patterson's Murder is Forever	Andrew	
2020	The Flood	Kelly Mckay	
2020	Operation Buffalo	Jones	
2020	Shadow in the Cloud	Tommy Dorn	
2022	No Exit	Ron Hill	
