= Katie Ritchie =

New Zealand netball player

Personal information
- Full name: Katie Ritchie
- Born: Geraldine, Canterbury, New Zealand
- Height: 1.88 m (6 ft 2 in)
- University: Lincoln University

Netball career
- Playing position: GS
Years	Club team	Apps
1999–2001	Canterbury Flames	
2002	Otago Rebels	
2003	Capital Shakers	
2004–05	Otago Rebels	
Years	National team	Caps
2002–?	New Zealand A	
- Updated on 3 January 2011

Katie Ritchie is a retired netball player as well as international rower and triathlete from New Zealand.

Ritchie played for the Canterbury Flames in the Coca-Cola Cup (later the National Bank Cup), starting from 1999. She transferred to the Otago Rebels after 2001, and made the New Zealand A side in 2002. The following year Ritchie transferred to Wellington-based Capital Shakers. She also received a callup to trial for the Silver Ferns to contest the 2003 Netball World Championships in Jamaica. Ritchie transferred back to the Otago Rebels the following year, playing with the Lois Muir-coached side in 2004 and 2005. She returned to the Shakers in 2006, but was forced to pull out before the start of the season with a recurring foot injury.

Ritchie has also competed at international rowing events and more recently triathlon. She competed at the 1997 World Junior Rowing Championships, where she made the final of the women's coxless fours, finishing sixth. She was chosen for the New Zealand women's development coxless four for the 2003 World Rowing Championships in Milan, but opted to focus on netball instead.
