= Penny McNamee =

Australian actress (born 1983)

- Born: 17 March 1983 (age 43); Sydney, Australia
- Occupation: Actress
- Years active: 1993–present
- Spouse: Matt Tooker (m. 2009)
- Children: 2
- Family: Jessica McNamee (sister); Teagan Croft (niece)

Penny McNamee (born 17 March 1983) is an Australian actress, best known for originating the role of Nessarose in the Australian premier of Wicked, playing Dr. Tori Morgan in Home and Away and writing the Stage Stars book series for Scholastic.

McNamee played MTV reporter Rachel in the Australian premiere production of MJ the Musical.

== Early and personal life ==
Penny McNamee was born in Sydney to Peter and Helen McNamee. She has three sisters, including actress Jessica McNamee, and a younger brother. Through her sister Rebecca, she is the aunt of actress Teagan Croft. Her cousin, Madelaine Collignon, is a news presenter for Prime7.

McNamee married Matt Tooker, director of a marketing agency, in 2009. They have a son. McNamee gave birth to their second child, a daughter, in March 2019.

== Career ==
=== Theatre ===
McNamee starred opposite Lucy Durack, Todd McKenney and Shane Jacobson in the critically acclaimed Neil Simon play, the Odd Couple at both the Comedy Theatre in Melbourne and the Theatre Royal in Sydney.

McNamee is perhaps best known on stage for her portrayal of Nessarose in the original Australian cast of Wicked for which she won the 2009 Green Room Award for Best Female in a Featured Role. The show opened on 12 July 2008, in Melbourne, where it ran for 13 months, closing on 9 August 2009. It then transferred to Sydney from 12 September 2009. McNamee played her final performance at the Capitol Theatre on 12 March 2010.

McNamee originated the role of Jennifer Gabriel in Cameron Mackintosh's production of The Witches of Eastwick. The show opened at the Princess Theatre in Melbourne and McNamee was nominated for a Mo Award for Best New Talent.

McNamee played the lead role of Jerusha Abbott in John Caird and Paul Gordon's musical Daddy Long Legs. Based on the book of the same name, Daddy Long Legs played at the Florida Studio Theater.

McNamee portrayed Donna in the Australian premier of Hurlyburly for the Griffin Theatre Company, Sydney. McNamee starred alongside Alex Dimitriades.

McNamee has performed in Carols in the Domain for Channel 7, Carols by Candlelight for Channel 9 and on Good Morning Australia.

In 2025, McNamee starred as MTV reporter Rachel in MJ the Musical in Sydney.

=== Film ===
McNamee completed filming on John Duigan's Australian feature film Careless Love, in which she played the role of Carol. The film was in postproduction in 2011 and was released in 2012.

In 2006, McNamee starred as Melissa in the Lionsgate US feature film See No Evil.

=== Television ===
Her guest roles on various US and Australian series including Blue Bloods (CBS), Elementary (CBS), Political Animals (USA), All Saints, White Collar Blue and Satisfaction.

in 2010, McNamee played the role of Hope in Tom Hanks and Steven Spielberg's HBO miniseries The Pacific. McNamee and Isabel Lucas play best friends who fell in love with American soldiers during World War II.

McNamee was cast in the supporting role of Ruth Crockett in the Warner Bros. miniseries Salem's Lot starring Rob Lowe. The series was aired on TNT in the USA.

In November 2015, McNamee was announced to have joined the cast of Seven Network soap opera Home and Away, as Tori Morgan, a doctor at the Northern Districts Hospital. She was introduced on 5 May 2016 during the Caravan Park explosion storyline. McNamee was nominated for the Best New Talent Logie Award for her role as Tori. She made her final appearance on 27 September 2021, after more than five years in the series. McNamee reprised the role for a guest appearance in April 2024.

== Filmography ==
=== Film ===
| Year | Title | Role | Type |
|---|---|---|---|
| 2003 | Fuel | Hitchhiker | Short film |
| 2006 | See No Evil | Melissa Beudroux | Feature film |
| 2007 | Hammer Bay | Alice Blakely | Short TV film |
| 2008 | The Tourist | Girl from Back Home | Short film |
| 2012 | Careless Love | Carol | Feature film |
| 2013 | Monkeywrench | Vanessa | Short film |
| 2014 | See No Evil 2 | Melissa Beudroux (uncredited) | Feature film |

=== Television ===
| Year | Title | Role | Type |
|---|---|---|---|
| 2003 | White Collar Blue | Alicia Moore (guest role) | TV series, season 2, 1 episode |
| 2003 | All Saints | Susie Chambers | TV series |
| 2004 | Salem's Lot | Ruth Crockett | TV miniseries |
| 2006 | headLand | Charlie Cooper (recurring role) | TV series, 8 episodes |
| 2010 | Satisfaction | Shop Assistant (guest role) | TV series, season 3, 1 episode |
| 2010 | The Pacific | Hope (guest role) | TV miniseries, 1 episode |
| 2012 | Political Animals | | TV miniseries |
| 2013 | Elementary | Vivian Tully (guest role) | TV series, season 1, 1 episode |
| 2013 | Blue Bloods | Marie Grasso (guest role) | TV series, season 3, 1 episode |
| | The Harringtons | | TV series |
| 2016–2021, 2024 | Home and Away | Tori Morgan | Seasons 29–34 (main cast), Season 37 (guest) |

=== Podcast ===
| Year | Title | Role | Type |
|---|---|---|---|
| 2022 | The Younger Man | | Podcast Series |

=== Writer ===
| Year | Title | Role | Type |
|---|---|---|---|
| 2023– | Home and Away | Writer | TV series, 2 episodes |
