= James Stewart (Australian actor) =

Australian stage, television and film actor (born 1975)

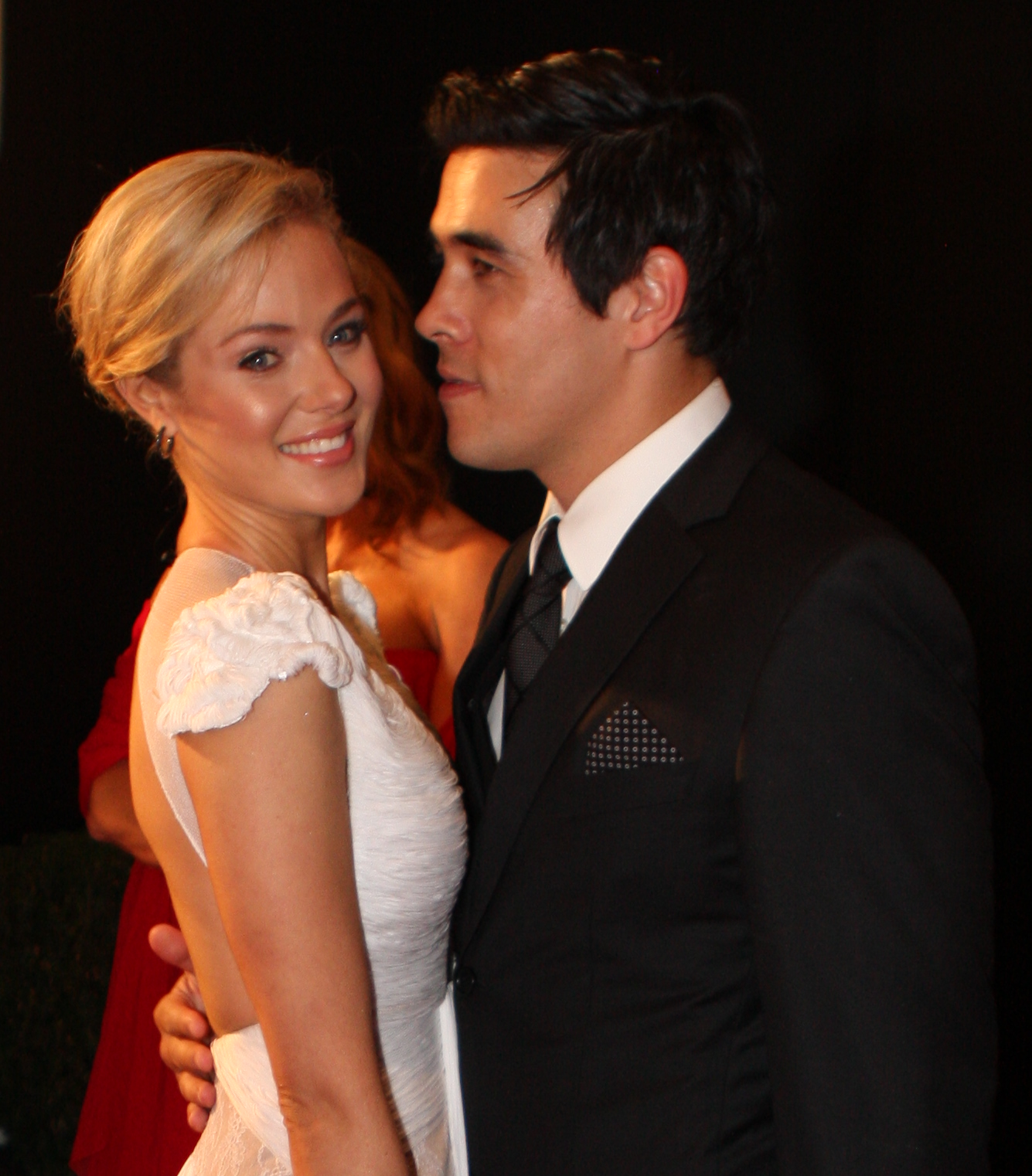
- James Stewart and Jessica Marais at the 2011 TV Week Logie Awards
- Born: 21 October 1975 (age 51); Melbourne, Victoria, Australia
- Occupation: Actor
- Years active: 1993–present
- Spouse: Sarah Roberts (m. 2019; div. 2024)
- Partner(s): Jessica Marais (2009–2015); Ada Nicodemou (2024–present)
- Children: 1

James Stewart (born 21 October 1975) is an Australian stage, television and film actor. He is known for his appearances in the television series Breakers, as Alex Markham (1998–1999), Packed to the Rafters, as Jake Barton (2009–2013), and Home and Away as Justin Morgan (2016–present).

== Early life ==
Stewart was born on 21 October 1975 in Melbourne. He has an identical twin brother Nicholas and older half-sister Annie. While he was in primary school, Stewart's mother, Beverly, drove him and his brother around Australia for a year in a caravan. His sister stayed in Melbourne for school, while he and Nicholas were home-schooled. The family eventually settled on the Gold Coast. His mother raised him and his two siblings as a single parent, while studying to become a teacher. She eventually graduated with honours in English and literature at Monash University. His estranged father Arthur Koo is a former Australian soldier who served in the Vietnam War. Stewart has Irish and Chinese ancestry through his parents. Stewart studied drama at university in Brisbane. In 1996, he joined the band george alongside his brother Nicholas, Tyrone Noonan and his then-housemate, Katie Noonan. He would later leave the band to pursue a career in acting full-time.

== Career ==
Stewart's first screen role was in The Adventures of Skippy in 1993. From 1998 until 1999, Stewart starred in the short lived series Breakers as "wild child" Alex Markham. He also appeared in the series BeastMaster in 2000, followed by a role in feature film Hildegarde.

In 2006, Stewart guested in H_{2}O: Just Add Water, before appearing in the Lifetime series Monarch Cove and the feature film Voodoo Lagoon. In 2007, he appeared in Mortified and the action film The Condemned. Also that year, Stewart played Jim O'Connor in the Queensland Theatre Company's production of The Glass Menagerie. He won the 2008 Matilda Award for Best Supporting Actor and was nominated for the Helpmann Award for Best Male Actor in a Supporting Role in a Play.

After appearing in an episode of Sea Patrol, Stewart starred as Jake Barton in Packed to the Rafters from 2009 until 2013. In 2010, he received a nomination for the Logie Award for Most Popular New Male Talent for his role as Jake. He also appeared in the 2009 Australian comedy drama film Subdivision.

In 2015, Stewart appeared in the Nine Network miniseries Gallipoli as Chinese-Australian marksman Billy Sing. That same year, he also starred in the ABC-TV drama series Hiding alongside Jacqueline McKenzie and Kate Jenkinson. The show centres around a family that is forced to go into the federal witness protection program and relocates to another city when the father (Stewart) is arrested after a failed drug deal.

In 2016, Stewart joined Home and Away as Justin Morgan during the show's twenty-ninth season. In July 2024, Stewart appeared on Season 21 of Dancing with the Stars. He was paired with Jorja Freeman.

== Personal life ==
He was engaged to co-star Jessica Marais, until they separated in 2015. Stewart and Marais have a daughter together, born May 2012. Stewart was in a relationship with his former Home and Away co-star Isabella Giovinazzo.

Stewart began a relationship with his Home and Away co-star Sarah Roberts in October 2017. They announced their engagement in December 2018, and married at Luttrellstown Castle in Ireland in July 2019. On 20 April 2024, Roberts announced that she and Stewart had divorced five weeks prior after an amicable break-up.

In July 2024, Ada Nicodemou confirmed via Stellar magazine that she and Stewart were in a relationship. Stewart and Nicodemou announced their engagement on 15 February 2026.

== Filmography ==
Year	Title	Role	Notes
1993	The Adventures of Skippy	Sam	Episode: "Skippy and the Vandals"
1995	Trapped in Space	2nd Tugman	Television film
1998–1999	Breakers	Alex Markham	Main cast
2000	The Lost World	Prisoner #1	Episode: "Amazons"
2000	BeastMaster	Han	Episode: "Ghosts of the Forest"
2001	Hildegarde	Festival Announcer	Feature film
2006	H_{2}O: Just Add Water	Fruit Delivery Guy (uncredited)	Episode: "The Big Chill"
2006	Monarch Cove	Davey Monroe	Main cast
2006	Voodoo Lagoon	Craig	Feature film
2007	Mortified	Mr. Listerman	Episode: "Taylor's Self Portrait"
2007	The Condemned	Belarus Scout	Feature film
2008	Sea Patrol	Zan	Episode: "Takedown"
2009	Subdivision	Brett	Feature film
2011	Virulent	291088	Short film
2009–2013	Packed to the Rafters	Jake Barton	Main cast
2015	Gallipoli	Billy Sing	Miniseries – episode "The Deeper Scar"
2015	Hiding	Troy Quigg/Lincoln Swift	Main cast
2016	Tomorrow When the War Began	Colonel	Recurring
2016–	Home and Away	Justin Morgan	Series regular
