= Martin Dibble =

- Home and Away character
- Portrayed by: Craig Thomson
- Duration: 1988–90, 2000, 2002
- First appearance: 17 January 1988
- Last appearance: 29 May 2002
- Introduced by: Alan Bateman (1988); John Holmes (2000); Julie McGuaran (2002)
In-universe information
- Occupation: Fish market worker Road worker Office worker Soldier; Radio technician
- Father: Ern Dibble
- Mother: Nola Dibble
- Brothers: Erroll Dibble; Scott Dibble

Martin Dibble is a fictional character from the Australian television soap opera Home and Away, played by Craig Thomson. He made his first appearance during the episode broadcast on 17 January 1988, during the show's pilot episode. Martin is characterised as an idle and concoctor of schemes that are always unsuccessful. Thomson has described him numerous times as a "yobbo" or a "yob". Writers often used Martin for comic relief in between the show's more serious stories. They also created an on-screen partnership between him and Lance Smart (Peter Vroom). Together they were the show's "larrikins" with over-the-top personalities.

The character was written out of the series by executive producer Andrew Howie. He decided to focus on new characters and change the show's stories. Thomson was delighted to leave and claimed the decision was mutual. Thomson departed during the episode broadcast on 3 April 1990. Thomson enjoyed his first year in the role but grew to dislike the experience during his second. He has since stated that the show changed until he grew to dislike it. He also believed that writers had run out of stories for Martin. Thomson played the role of Martin in the 1991 stage show, Home and Away: The Musical. Thomson returned to film a guest appearance, in which Martin attends his friend Sally Fletcher's (Kate Ritchie) wedding. In 2002, he returned once again to celebrate Summer Bay's fictional "150 year anniversary". Television critics have ridiculed the character for his lack of intelligence.

== Creation and casting ==
Thomson's only acting role prior to joining the cast was in a television commercial for soft drinks. In 1987, Home and Away producers asked Thomson to audition for a role, after they watched him in the commercial. Thomson auditioned alongside Adam Willits, while Thomson secured the role of Martin, Willits went on to play Steven Matheson. Of his casting Thomson said they "went along to the auditions and got the parts, there's not much to tell really". Home and Away was Thomson's first television role.

When Thomson won the role of Martin he was thankful because he had not achieved high grades in his studies. After he had read his first scripts for Martin, Thomson travelled to West Australia to research the role. Martin is portrayed as a "yobbo" and Thomson believed that the area was ideal to observe "yobbos" socialising. He told a writer from Look-in that Martin was directly based on the people he had seen on his trip.

== Development ==
=== Characterisation ===
"Lance and Martin provide the comic relief in Summer Bay, and are always coming up with madcap – and usually totally disastrous – schemes. Martin may be a lifelong contender for 'Nerd of the Year', and who can blame him with a family like his."

— Clive Hopwood on Martin.

In his book Home and Away Annual, Kesta Desmond describes Martin as a "beach bum" and who a big ego because he sees himself as one of the most attractive men in Summer Bay. When Martin faces rejection from females who do appreciate his "charm", his "confidence remains undented". As Martin is also characterised as a "yob", Thomson said that members of the public assume he is going to behave like Martin. Thomson described Martin as being "completely over the top, and very different from the rest of the cast. I really like playing comedy." Thomson later said that "Martin's like every other bully, he fancies himself as a boxer and thinks he's tough. In fact, he's a coward". In 1990, Thomson said that Martin has a "heart of gold" but is let down by his brain.

In 1990, Thomson told Nick Fisher from TV Guide that "I wouldn't say my character's really dumb, but he's a bit of a yob. He tries really hard but he never succeeds in what he's doing." He added that Martin is "a bit of a wacko" which made him ideal to add comic relief in the show. Thomson concluded that he could not associate with someone like Martin because of his "wacko" characterisation. Thomson told the reporter from Look-in that he was nothing like his character. Martin does not know how to have a good time because he is a "dag"; and is forever thinking up ideas which eventually fail. Martin also has the tendency to act "quite selfish" and he is "very greedy". Thomson said that he disliked his character's greediness even though he always knew that was how Home and Away intended to portray him. Martin is not "really a bad guy" either, and Thomson said that everyone needed to treat him as "a bit of a joke" and that he would never choose to spend time with Martin.

Martin forms an on-screen duo with the character of Lance Smart (Peter Vroom), Thomson said that the characters are Home and Away's answer to Laurel and Hardy. Like Martin, Lance is not popular with females and even "their closest friends" think they are unattractive. They are portrayed as a pair of "yobbos and larrikins" who work at a local oyster farm. The characters have a general dislike for the local males who enjoy surfing. They become their "great nemesis" because they manage to get "all the girls". As Martin believes he is "the most irresistible male in Summer Bay", Lance is so impressed by Martin that he believes he is actually irresistible. Thomson said that the duo "stand out a lot" because of their over-the-top nature. While Vroom felt they rarely got "serious" scenes because they were mostly involved in comedic storylines. Vroom criticised the writing Martin and Lance received because he did not think it represented how young people behave. Home and Away's critics also scrutinised the writing "for a lack of realism". Vroom said "Usually Lance and Martin are drinking yobs, but they're not allowed to swear which is not so realistic." While Thomson said the serial's early evening time slot often caused dialogue to be censored. Vroom added that "Lance and Martin are definitely drinkers and if it wasn't for the timeslot they would be into marijuana too." Though he defended the characters because they had to be responsible and cater for young viewers. Writers continued Martin's series of unsuccessful ventures when he joins a band they flop.

=== Departure and returns ===
"I did two and a half years of Home and Away. It was hard work and the first year was great, but things started to change and I'd taken my character as far as I could. I'm not really like him. I'm loveable but not a rogue."

— Thomson discussing his departure from the show. (1990)

In September 1989, it was announced that Thomson would be leaving Home and Away the following year. Thomson's contract was due to expire in February 1990. The show's producer, Andrew Howie decided not to renew either Thomson or Vroom's contracts to focus on new characters. Howie told David Brown from TV Week that "We feel we've exhausted their characters and their stories. With the new members of the cast, we have greater potential with other characters for 1990. It's sad to lose original cast members, but it's a developing program. We think viewers will like the direction Home and Away will take." Thomson told a reporter from TV Life that he had previously thought about leaving to launch a music career. He told TV Guide's Fisher that playing the same role for two years had been exhausting and became "a drag". He told a reporter from Birmingham Weekly Mercury that Martin he had become an annoying character.

Thomson later told Neil Bonner from Bristol Evening Post that Martin being written out was a mutual decision between him and Howie. Thomson was "delighted" when they reached an agreement. He explained that "I just got really sick of the character, it got to the stage I couldn't bear playing him any longer." He told a reporter from Look-in magazine that he would not return to Home and Away again. He reasoned that there was no scope left to further develop the character in future storylines. Thomson assessed that Martin "had his day really, throughout the whole show he's done so many things, there's not much else left for him to try."

Thomson was also unhappy with the show itself because of changes that production made. He believed that it became too different from the "really Aussie show" he had joined. Thomspn explained that "in the early days I think it represented Australia better. It's gone on a different track now." He further lambasted his experience to Nicky Brown from Frome Journal, adding: "I just had to get out", "it's awful" and "I hate it". Martin made departed the show in an episode broadcast in April 1990. Thomson moved to United Kingdom following his departure. Home and Away was broadcast on British television one year behind Australian viewings. Thomson used the opportunity to watch his performances back, which he described as "bad".

However, Thomson played the character in the 1991 theatre production, Home and Away: The Musical. The musical theatre show was a £1.6 million stage production which featured Thomson and four other cast members reprising their roles. It toured UK theatre venues during 1991. Thomson and Vroom returned to filming in 2000 when Martin and Lance arrive to attend Sally Fletcher's (Kate Ritchie) wedding. Thomson returned again in 2002, alongside various past cast members. Their returns coincided with a storyline to celebrate Summer Bay's fictional "150 year anniversary". When he returns, Martin pretends he has become a millionaire.

== Storylines ==
Martin and Lance watch new arrivals in town Carly Morris (Sharyn Hodgson), Lynn Davenport (Helena Bozich) and Sally; he is instantly taken with Carly. Soon afterwards, he clashes with Bobby Simpson (Nicolle Dickson) when he and Lance reveal they had known all along who was responsible for the fire she had nearly been blamed for. As a result, he ends up getting into a fight with Steven. Martin saves Carly from drowning but uses up the goodwill when he stops the object of her desires Matt Wilson (Greg Benson) from visiting her. When Martin has another clash with Bobby, during which her school dress is ripped, the girls decide to get their own back on Lance and Martin by letting the handbrake off their van. The van rolls into the car being driven by school Principal Walter Bertram (Owen Weingott), leaving him hospitalised with minor injuries. Since it is their work van, they end up being fired. Martin and Lance blame the school's deputy principal, Donald Fisher (Norman Coburn), whose brother is their employer, so they get their revenge by putting jellyfish in his car. They then find Donald had got them their jobs back and rush to put it right, only to be caught and sentenced to clean the car out.

Martin and Lance decide to have some fun at the expense of slow-witted local Nico Pappas (Nicholas Papademetriou) by convincing him to use his cow to "fertilise" Donald's lawn. They are forced to own up to stop Nico getting into trouble and Donald orders them to clean the muck up with their hands. The incident contributes to Nico attacking Donald after his cow was poisoned and being temporarily institutionalised. As punishment, Alf Stewart (Ray Meagher), who owns the local bottle shop, refuses to serve them alcohol so they try brewing their own. They accidentally get Donald's cat drunk and has to sober him up before Donald finds out. Martin then joins a band that Frank Morgan (Alex Papps) and Ruth Stewart (Justine Clarke) put together as the bassist and is caught in the crossfire when the couple fall out. Pippa Fletcher (Vanessa Downing) takes over from Roo as their lead singer for a talent contest. Martin and Lance organise a town dance and run afoul of the so-called "Summer Bay Nutter", the person responsible for poisoning Nico's cow, who steals Martin's car wheels. Martin has big plans for the band but Frank disbands it when Roo became pregnant. Martin and Lance decided to start up a western act instead and play it for the Summer Bay High students, who like the cheesy act but give up on idea after they fail with a different audience

Martin begins sharing a flat with Frank and Lance's cousin Narelle (Amanda Newman-Phillips). When Lance has a big win on the lottery, Martin begins costing him money, leaving the keys in his new sports car so it is stolen and vandalised and fails to pay the insurance. The pair fall foul of conman Gary Samuels (Darius Perkins) when he tricks them into investing in a fake nightclub development and teams up with several other locals to bring him down. Martin's next scheme is to impress businesswoman Stacey Macklin (Sandie Lillingston) by getting Celia Stewart (Fiona Spence) to sell her store, which is needed for a development, to her. He and Lance try to get her to sell up by planting a cockroach in a cereal packet but it fails and Stacey chooses a different site. He and Lance later record a record for charity which a friend of Stacey's, Nina Olivera (Raquel Suartzman), markets as a novelty record. Nina offers to make them stars but Lance, unhappy with having Nina ordering them about, deliberately wrecks their big chance by revealing they have been miming to all their records. They are further humiliated when Nina reveals to the press that she had deliberately chosen two no-hopers to prove that a good promoter could make anyone a success.

Following rejection from Roo, Martin bounces back by dating Leanne Dunn (Kylie Foster) but when Celia begins giving her lessons to make her more ladylike, he loses interest. Martin tries to get her to break up with him, but instead she thinks he wants to get married. Unimpressed by his behaviour, Leanne starts dressing up in revealing clothes to make him break it off, only for him to prefer her that way. Leanne's ex, Meat Axe (Joseph Dicker), returns and challenges Martin to a fight. Despite taking Karate lessons from Steven, Martin takes a serious beating until Leanne steps in and stops the fight. She then leaves with Meat Axe.

Stacey agrees to hire Martin if he manages to impress a client. Tom and Frank accidentally get Peter Bedford (Bevan Wilson), one of the clients offside; Martin charms him back and is given a job for a trial period. When a group of Japanese clients take a liking to Martin, Stacey and Tom are unable to fire him so they give him the grand-sounding but fairly lowly post of transport manager. Martin takes over the office when Tom went missing but accidentally shreds an important file and is sacked.

Martin asks Lance's girlfriend Marilyn Chambers (Emily Symons) to set him up on a date with one of her friends, who turns out to be a bookish, nerdy girl named Greta (Jodie Gilles). Martin surprises himself by getting on well with her and is disappointed when Greta leaves. He then turns his attention to new girl in town, Jenny (Michelle Pettigrove). Lance and Marilyn, thinking Martin is still depressed, ask Lance's ex Rhonda (Genevive McCunn; Anna Plateris) to cheer him up and the two girls turn up at the same time. After a botched scheme, Lance has a hard time forgiving Martin until he and Marilyn overhear him on the phone to a doctor saying he does not have a lot of time left. They assume he is dying but in fact he is joining the army and was discussing his medical. They ask Carly, who Martin has long been attracted to, to go on a date with him and kiss him to make his remaining time in Summer Bay pleasurable. She reluctantly agrees and is annoyed when she discovers the truth. Martin thanks Lance for arranging it before saying a fond farewell. Lance later joins Martin in the army.

In 2000, Martin returns to town for Sally's abortive wedding to Kieran Fletcher (Spencer McLaren), wearing a flash suit and driving a sports car. He claims to be the area manager of the car radio company Mobitune, but in fact he sleeps on the beach after telling everyone he is staying at the Sands Resort. Judith Ackroyd (Anna Hruby) asks him to address a class as a successful ex-pupil and he annoys Donald by telling them not to bother with school because it had never done him any good. Ailsa realises Martin is hiding something and he admits he works for Mobitune as a technician and the car is hired. Martin offers Vinnie Patterson (Ryan Kwanten) the job of New South Wales area manager, but manages to put him off by talking of the long hours and intensive training. Ailsa tells him the truth will impress people just as much, since he is doing skilled work. Martin returns for the town's sesquicentenary celebrations, after Ailsa's death, and reveals the truth about Mobitune to Alf and Donald. He then sets about making plans with Lance to start a luxury car business. When the boat carrying several residents as part of the celebrations is shipwrecked, he helps with the search that finds Sally, Sophie Simpson (Rebekah Elmaloglou) and Blake Dean (Les Hill) but has to leave town before the search is completed.

== Reception ==
Ahead of the pilot's airing, Lucy Clark of The Sydney Morning Herald described Martin and Lance as "two surfie blokes who are thick as two short planks". Martin and Lance were branded the "thickest characters ever to grace soapland" by a columnist from the Daily Record. Robyn Harvey from the publication opined that Martin was just "a big dag". A columnist from Inside Soap said that when Martin spent time with Vinnie Patterson (Ryan Kwanten) they were "a match made in dodgy business hell". Another writer from the publication branded Martin "the bay's original wheeler dealer". Jason Herbison from All About Soap described Martin stating "in the late eighties, Martin was pulling the kind of scams that Vinnie would be in awe of these days!" Lawrie Masterton from TV Week branded Martin and Lance as "a couple of fairly harmless beach oafs".

A writer from TV Guide believed that Martin was an unlucky-in-love character. They profiled him stating "oh, the path of true love! It's never smooth at the best of times and, in the experience of the small and imperfectly formed Martin Dibble, all too likely to run smack into the side of a mountain." They described Martin and Greta's romance as a "fairy-tale" because she is the "ugly duckling" who was transformed by Martin's attention. They also sympathised with him when she abruptly left, adding "now even a Dibble doesn't deserve that." A writer from The Stage branded Martin a "loveable yob" type of character. A Stockport Express Advertiser journalist described the character as "Lance's mate with less brain cells than Nobby."

In November 2021, three critics for The West Australian placed Martin at number 24 in their feature on the "Top 50 heroes we love and villains we hate" from Home and Away. Of the character, they stated: "Lance's other half Martin was the 'brains' of the operation, regularly leading his offsider astray. He lived in the caravan park and was there to welcome the Fletchers when they moved to the Bay."
