= Celia Stewart =

- Home and Away character
- Portrayed by: Fiona Spence; Gilda Ferguson (flashback); Tatham Lennox (flashback); Annie Buckley (flashback)
- Duration: 1988–1990, 2000, 2002, 2005, 2012–2013
- First appearance: 26 January 1988
- Last appearance: 5 March 2013
- Introduced by: Alan Bateman (1988); John Holmes (2000); Julie McGauran (2002); Lucy Addario (2012)
In-universe information
- Occupation: Shopkeeper; Missionary
- Father: Gordon Stewart
- Mother: Sarah-Jane Stewart
- Brothers: Alf Stewart
- Sisters: Morag Bellingham; Barbara Stewart; Debra Stewart
- Half-sisters: Colleen Smart
- Grandfathers: Angus Stewart
- Nephews: Owen Dalby; Duncan Stewart; Alan Fisher; Lance Smart
- Nieces: Quinn Jackson; Roo Stewart; Maureen Evans; Rebecca Nash; Bobby Marshall
- Other relatives: Martha MacKenzie; Sam Marshall; Seb Miller; Ric Dalby; Bryce Stewart

Celia Stewart is a fictional character from the Australian soap opera Home and Away played by Fiona Spence. She made her first screen appearance during the episode broadcast on 26 January 1988. The character is portrayed as a gossiping busybody and spinster who occupies her time with the Presbyterian church. In her early appearances, she formed an alliance with Donald Fisher (Norman Coburn) and, though she has conservative views, she is not malicious. After one year as Celia, Spence hoped that she would find romance and change her attire. Producers decided to implement change and added smart outfits to the character's wardrobe. Spence decided to leave the series in 1990 and Celia departed the same year. She has since reprised the role on four occasions. After carrying out missionary work in Africa she returned to Summer Bay in 2000, 2002 and 2005. In 2012, it was announced that Spence had agreed to return once again. Originally heralded as the chance for Celia to reconnect with her on-screen brother, Alf Stewart (Ray Meagher), it was later revealed that she was hiding a shameful secret.

== Casting ==
Spence's casting in the serial was publicised in the 9 January 1988 issue of TV Week. Writer David Brown said Spence had been cast in the major role of "town busybody" Celia Stewart. It marked Spence's television comeback, after she previously starred in Prisoner as Vera Bennett from 1979 until 1981. Spence returned to her native Sydney for filming, after eight years away, and she said she was looking forward to another regular television part. She told Brown "The series has a lot of charm and warmth. It's also good to be working on a series from day one. I remember the same feeling on Prisoner because I was also there from the beginning." Spence was also "eagerly" looking forward to playing her new character, and Spence said Celia was "so different. She's very vulnerable, unlike Vera."

== Character development ==
=== Characterisation ===
"She's well-meaning but tactless. She's pretty gossipy and a bit bigoted. She's very interested in everyone else's life because she really doesn't have one of her own. She's going to be really interesting to play. There's quite a touch of snobbery there."

— Spence on Celia (1988)

In the Home and Away Annual, Melanie J. Clayden wrote that Celia "loves to gossip and can be a real busybody". Celia "must be regarded" with sympathy because she is a "lonely spinster with nothing but the Presbyterian church to occupy her time". In the Annual written by Kesta Desmond, she was described as the youngest sister of Alf Stewart (Ray Meagher), but "unlike him she has never married" which turned her into the "stereotypical spinster" and "keen church goer" with a "bitter life". In the book Home and Away Special Celia and her older sister Morag Bellingham (Cornelia Frances) are described as being "two sides of a coin". Celia is "quiet and conservative", which contrasts with the "ruthless" Morag. Andrew Mercado wrote in his book, Super Aussie Soaps, that she was a "prudish" character. She has also been described as a "bitter spinster" and the "town gossip".

Celia was similarly described by the serial writing team as, "the town's busy-body spinster, bitter that love has passed her by and taking that bitterness out on the world." She is a "major ally" to Donald Fisher (Norman Coburn) and loves to gossip because it "helps fill her life". Despite these traits, there is "not a malicious bone in her body". In the book Home and Away: Behind the Scenes, Spence told James Oram that Celia is very different from the character she previously played on Prisoner. Unlike Vera Bennett, Celia is "very vulnerable". Celia is involved a comedy storyline in which locals search for the Summer Bay bunyip. Spence said that her funniest night shoot occurred while filming Alf cooking bunyip burgers and Celia selling tea towels.

She also revealed that there would some changes to her character. After one year in the series, Spence had hoped that Celia would find a man and dress better. Home and Away's writers then informed Spence that they would make those slight changes. She told Oram that "there's a touch of romance that will be wonderful for Celia and there will be a remarkable change in her appearance. Celia will be going on a shopping spree to buy some rather smart outfits." Other than Spence, Celia has been portrayed by Gilda Ferguson, Tatham Lennox, and Annie Buckley in flashback sequences.

=== Returns (2000-05) ===
"I am absolutely delighted to be back in Summer Bay! I have never turned down an opportunity to bring Celia out of mothballs; she is a great character and I love playing her. I’ve just adored playing her. She has always been such a fun character so, I’ve enjoyed many story lines.

— Spence on reprising the role of Celia (2012)

In 1990, Spence decided to leave Home and Away and Celia was written out. Spence reprised her role as Celia in 2000 and 2002. In 2005, she returned for the serial's 4,000th episode based around Alf Stewart's (Ray Meagher) 60th birthday. During her time away, Celia had been working as a missionary in Africa. But after she was taken hostage, she returned to Summer Bay but left soon after. While two of her returns were brief, her 2002 return was a longer stint. As Andrea Black noted in Home and Away Official Collector’s Edition, her visit "started well but later fared no better". Celia subsequently decided to leave once again.

=== Return (2012) ===
In 2012, Spence's management announced that she had reprised her role and returned to Home and Away. Spence confirmed her return to the show during an interview with a TV Week writer. She revealed that she was currently filming her scenes. In 2012, production staff felt they needed to refocus on "core family issues" to make the characters closer to one another. Celia's return was pioneered around this need. Lucy Addario told a writer from Home and Away Official Collector’s Edition that "Ceila is returning, so that is a treat for long-time fans and it is nice to tell a story about Alf connecting with his sister who he hasn't seen for years." It later was revealed that Celia would return for the wedding of Roo Stewart (Georgie Parker) and Harvey Ryan (Marcus Graham). Celia had previously shared "a frosty relationship" with Roo. Celia is keen to meet Harvey but is left unimpressed by him. She causes trouble for the couple when she decides that Harvey is not good enough for Roo. Spence told Daniel Kilkelly from Digital Spy that, "Celia is absolutely supportive of Roo, but I don't believe she will ever think anyone is good enough for Roo. That means Harvey has his work cut out for him winning over Celia."

After Roo's wedding, Celia prepares to leave. Spence told a reporter from TV Week that "just as Celia is about to leave, there are tears and a confession that she can't go anywhere." She reveals that a con man has stolen all of her money, but the reporter revealed that Celia's secret was "more shameful". Spence explained that Celia is not being entirely truthful with Alf because she is ashamed. Her character’s shame helped Spence understand the dishonesty. She concluded that her return had been a "pleasure" because of the chance to work with Meagher and having Morag and Colleen on-screen offered Celia familiarity. Spence has revealed that Celia will be on-screen "for a while" and she would be willing to reprise the role again.

== Storylines ==
Celia is the younger sister of Summer Bay stalwart Alf. In her youth, she was engaged to Les Palmer (Graham Lancaster) but he was killed in the Vietnam War and Celia never married. She is first seen talking to Alf about his relationship with Ailsa Hogan (Judy Nunn). Celia is judgmental and something of a gossip but ultimately well-meaning. She supports former brother-in-law Donald's attempts to have mentally disabled resident Nico Pappas (Nicholas Papademetriou) sectioned but changes her mind quickly once Tom Fletcher (Roger Oakley) speaks to her. Celia unwittingly spreads the news that Carly Morris (Sharyn Hodgson) has been raped. Seeing the hurt she has caused, Celia tries to apologise to Carly and Tom but neither is willing to listen. Ailsa gives her a packet of chewing gum and advises her to use it whenever she feels like gossiping. Alf and Ailsa try to set her up by inviting her and local police sergeant Bob Barnett (Robert Baxter) to dinner. Celia spends the night getting drunk and Barnett has to escort her home. Celia invites him to watch her play tennis but assures him she only wanted to be friends with him. A bemused Barnett tells her that he has only ever seen her that way.

Celia's niece, Roo (Justine Clarke), falls pregnant and, believing Frank Morgan (Alex Papps) is the father, Celia tries to arrange for the pair to get married. Morag, Celia's sister, persuades Roo to admit Frank is not the father and Celia gives Roo a place to stay. Celia purchases the local store from Ailsa when she sells it. Her first act is to try to evict Frank and his friend, Narelle Smart (Amanda Newman-Phillips), from the flat above the store. Local doctor Philip Matheson (John Morris), a friend of the youngsters and fellow tenant, persuades Celia to give them a few months to move out. When Narelle is supportive towards Celia when her great-niece Martha (Burcin Kapkin) is kidnapped by her father, Brett Macklin (Gerry Sont), Celia decides not to evict her. Celia is shocked when she learns Frank's new wife Bobby Simpson (Nicolle Dickson) is Morag's daughter from an affair with Donald and, thus, her niece. Celia unwittingly reveals the truth when reporter James Donahue (Richard Morgan) begins asking questions. Morag moves in with Celia at their parents' old house and she is annoyed but relieved when Morag moves out to the Blaxland mansion.

The store is destroyed in an arson attack by Brian 'Dodge' Forbes (Kelly Dingwall), which results in Philip's death. Celia makes arrangements with former school counsellor Andrew Foley (Peter Bensley) to set up a youth advice centre in the back room of the Diner, but is disgusted when she learns Andrew is an alcoholic and he leaves town. She persuades Ailsa to let her try running it on her own but Carly, who recently had a drinking problem, pretends to be drunk to show Celia she would not know how to deal with someone with a genuine problem. Andrew returns sober and asks Celia to help by counseling Marilyn Chambers (Emily Symons) but she panics when Marilyn takes some sleeping tablets and thinks she has attempted suicide. Celia causes more turmoil when her nephew Duncan (Allana Ellis) suffers an allergic reaction to an old family christening gown she provides.

Celia befriends Nigel Taggart (Gary Down), Morag's assistant, and he becomes her dance partner. She develops feelings for him but Nigel does not reciprocate; however, in order to let her down gently, he tells her he is going to reunite with his fiancée. A spiteful Morag tells her the truth and Nigel sends her a letter of apology. Celia receives attention from Ian McTavish (Noel Trevarthen), a Scottish explorer searching for the legendary Summer Bay bunyip, but quickly ends their date when she suspect he is merely after local information. She buys Lance Smart (Peter Vroom) and Martin Dibble's (Craig Thomson) hot dog business and asks them to work for her. While showing potential buyers around Morag's house, Celia becomes convinced the place is haunted. Alf's niece Emma Jackson (Dannii Minogue) and her friends decide to have some fun with the idea, convincing Reverend Flowers (Philip Ross) that Celia has a drinking problem when she asks him to perform an exorcism. She ends up doing the job herself with some holy water just as two bemused potential buyers turn up. Andrew, Alf, and Celia get their revenge by interrupting a party the youngsters are holding at the house with a staged haunting.

Celia's judgmental streak is present when she is the only person to believe that teacher Grant Mitchell (Craig McLachlan) has sexually molested his student, Vicki Baxter (Nana Coburn). Vicki's lies are exposed and Grant is cleared, forcing Celia to apologise to him. She then becomes involved in organizing African Awareness Week in the bay, persuading Alf, Ailsa, and Donald to assist her. Her efforts produce awkward results. She is embarrassed when some cardboard cut-outs of African women she ordered are topless and covers them with strategically placed towels. Problems escalate when Celia orders some documentary videos about Africa, which turn out to be porn video that she unwittingly rents out. Reverend Christopher Goodhope (Ron Becks) arrives in the Bay and Celia decides to become a missionary and joins him in Africa. Ten years later, Celia is taken hostage in Nigeria by rebels. Alf goes over in person to negotiate her release before taking her back with him. She quickly discovers Duncan (now played by Brendan McKensy) and his new friend Nick Smith (Chris Egan) getting into trouble and takes them to task. This results in someone (later revealed as Nick's mother Eve (Robyn Gibbes), who has recently been released from a mental institute) throwing stones at her but she is pleased when Duncan sticks up for her against Nick. She returns to Africa. Celia returns to the Bay briefly two years later for the town's 150th anniversary celebrations and again briefly in 2005 for Alf's 60th birthday. Seven years later, Celia returns for Roo's wedding. Celia tells Alf she has no home to return to because a man has conned her. She takes a job at the Diner but she annoys the owner Irene Roberts (Lynne McGranger). Harvey challenges Celia to a game of poker and he notices that she is an experienced player. Celia steals money from the caravan park and the Diner, but soon replaces it. Alf accuses Celia, who confesses to having a gambling addiction. She decides to attend a help group but Alf soon discovers she lied. Marilyn helps Celia and Alf reconcile and she contacts Celia's ex-boyfriend Sheldon Atkinson (Laurence Coy). He arrives and Celia gives him another chance but, when he wants to gamble again, she breaks up with him. Celia reveals that she needs to help others to occupy her time and prevent gambling. She lectures Heath Braxton (Dan Ewing) and Bianca Scott (Lisa Gormley) on public displays of affection. She changes her mind about Heath and advises him to ask Bianca to marry him. This causes trouble between them but Celia gives her old engagement ring to Heath to win Bianca back. Celia decides that she is better off helping others away from Summer Bay and leaves.
