= Narelle Smart =

- Home and Away character
- Portrayed by: Amanda Newman-Phillips
- First appearance: 25 March 1988
- Last appearance: 5 October 1988
- Introduced by: Alan Bateman
In-universe information
- Occupation: Shop assistant
- Father: Roy Smart
- Uncles: Les Smart
- First cousins: Lance Smart

Narelle Smart is a fictional character from the Australian Channel Seven soap opera Home and Away, played by Amanda Newman-Phillips. Narelle debuted on-screen during the episode airing on 25 March 1988, but left the show just over six months later.

== Casting ==
Newman-Phillips, who was professionally trained at Ensemble Theatre Studios in Sydney, went onto have two other soap roles before joining the cast of Home and Away. In 1989, Newman-Phillips was chosen as one of four cast members who toured and promoted the show in United Kingdom, following its debut there. The actors also helped launch the show's official UK fan club.

== Development ==
Narelle is described as the "Home and Away dreamer, a dizzy 20-year-old blonde who plotted on leaving her home town of Yabbie Creek, to become a rich and famous popstar".

Narelle's first on-screen kiss is with fellow character Steven Matheson (Adam Willits), at the age of seventeen, Steven is three years younger than Narelle. As the age difference was reflected off-screen too, it made everyone involved in the scenes nervous. Willits said, "I'd go for an older woman, if Steven can, I certainly can." While discussing the scenes he added "In the script, he had this plan to get Narelle to kiss me, because he has done a survey and he's a pretty hot kisser. It wasn't as though they were in love though." In an interview with Murray Clifford from Evening Times, Newman-Phillips described the filming the story, revealing "Narelle seduces Steven and when it came to the kissing scene we were both very nervous. It was the first for both of us and we just couldn't get the scene right, so we did some extra rehearsing. The kiss only lasted a minute, but in the end, it took us a couple of hours to get it perfect for the cameras." Whilst interviewed by TV Week, Willits stated: "When you consider rehearsals and retakes, we kissed a hell of a lot. It was great. She gave me all the pointers". While Newman-Phillips said, "Adam's a sweetie after all the fuss had died down it was great fun." Willits later revealed that Steven and Narelle's kiss was "his greatest moment" in the show.

Newman-Phillips was contracted as a guest cast member. Of her Narelle's exit from the series, the actress told a reporter from TV Life that "Narelle left in search of a guy. It was left open-ended. Now I think they want me back so I could be returning to the show around March." She added that it would have been great to reprise her role, something which has never happened. In December 1989, Mike Brenard from The People reported that Newman-Phillips had been involved in a contractual pay dispute with producers. Newman-Phillips refused to comment on the issue but her mother, Heather claimed poor treatment of her daughter that played into her departure. She added that Newman-Phillips received "low wages" for her role and was never compensated for the show's success in the UK.

== Storylines ==
Narelle arrives at the Summer Bay House asking to audition for Frank Morgan's (Alex Papps) band. Narelle is the cousin of Lance Smart (Peter Vroom) and Bobby Simpson (Nicolle Dickson) helps her to get ready and she starts her audition by dancing around Frank's living room and singing for him. Bobby thinks Narelle is better suited to stripping so Frank told her that she could not join the band, but should pursue a career in dancing. Narelle tells Bobby that she should dress more feminine in order to impress Frank, who Narelle thinks is attractive.

Narelle attends the school dance and asks Bobby if she has made her move on Frank. Martin Dibble (Craig Thomson) and Lance convince Narelle to sneak into the local hospital to find out what had happened to Frank and Roo Stewart (Justine Clarke), after they break up. She later visits Frank with the proposal that he moves in with her. Frank is tired of life at the caravan park and takes her up on the offer, moving into the flat above the general store. This annoys Celia Stewart (Fiona Spence) who does not approve of Narelle's short skirts. Alf Stewart (Ray Meagher) employs Narelle at the general store which annoys Celia even more. Celia begins to order Narelle around at work and treats her badly. After helping Steven out with his science project on kissing, she falls for him and they begin dating, much to the town's shock as there is a four-year age gap. However, this is cut short when Narelle falls for his uncle, Philip (John Morris) and kisses him. In order to save Steven's reputation out of fear he may be bullied for being dumped, Philip and Narelle concoct a story in which Steven dumps Narelle. Celia threatens to evict Narelle from the flat but after she supports her in time of family drama, she relents. The next target of Narelle's affections is Gary Samuels (Darius Perkins) but she changes her mind when Carly Morris (Sharyn Hodgson) accuses Gary of raping her. Narelle then decides to leave Summer Bay in order to find herself a man. She later settles in Queensland and Bobby visits her for several weeks.

== Reception ==
The role of Narelle made Newman-Phillips one of the most famous soap stars in the United Kingdom and was tipped to replace Kylie Minogue (Neighbours) as the "number one". Sue Corbett from Sunday Life reported that Newman-Phillips and Benson were "expected to attract the same cult following as their screen rivals Kylie Minogue and Jason Donovan." Writers from Edinburgh Evening News and Daily Mirror branded the character a "dizzy blonde". Another Daily Mirror reporter called her "sex-pot Narelle" and Mike Brenard from The People branded her role in the soap as the "sexbomb Narelle". Journalist Murray Clifford wrote that Narelle is a "gorgeous blond" in articles published in both South Wales Echo and Evening Times.
