= List of Home and Away characters introduced in 1988 =

Home and Away is an Australian television soap opera. It was first broadcast on the Seven Network on 17 January 1988. The following is a list of characters that first appeared in that year, by order of first appearance. They were all introduced by the show's executive producer Alan Bateman who oversaw the serial before being succeeded by series producer Des Monaghan whose episodes first began airing in November.

Sixteen of the original eighteen regular characters debuted in the pilot episode. The Fletcher family consisting of Frank Morgan, Tom and Pippa Fletcher, Carly Morris, Steven Matheson, Sally Keating and Lynn Davenport were introduced first. Summer Bay residents Alf Stewart, Floss and Neville McPhee, Bobby Simpson, Donald Fisher, Ailsa Hogan, Martin Dibble, Lance Smart and Matt Wilson also made their debuts. They were soon joined by Alf's daughter Roo and sister, Celia.

In March, Lyn Collingwood arrived as Lance's mother, Colleen. The same month, Liddy Clark began playing Kerry Barlow and Amanda Newman-Phillips joined the cast as Narelle Smart. In April, Gerry Sont began playing Brett Macklin, a love interest for Roo. Barbara Stephens and Cornelia Frances arrived in June as Alf's other sisters Barbara Stewart and Morag Bellingham, respectively. July saw Simon Kay enter as Donald and Barbara's son Alan Fisher. Gavin Harrison began playing Revhead in August and was soon followed by John Morris as Philip Matheson. That month saw the serial's first birth Christopher Fletcher, son of the established Tom and Pippa. Another birth occurred in September, Martha Stewart, daughter of Roo and Brett. Sandie Lillingston joined the cast in the same episode as Brett's sister, Stacey. Gary Samuels debuted in October and in November, George Leppard guested as Al Simpson.

== Frank Morgan ==
Frank Morgan, played by Alex Papps, debuted on-screen during the episode airing on 17 January 1988 and appeared until 1989. Frank was the first character to appear, although a Police officer (Bruce Venables) spoke the first piece of dialogue. Frank was played by Bradley Pilato in the scene, which was set in 1978 as a young Frank tries to escape from the Police officer. Papps' casting was announced ahead of the series debut. In 1991, Papps reprised the role for four weeks. Papps also returned for guest appearances in 2000 and 2002 respectively. Eamonn McCusker of The Digital Fix said that Frank was a "decent-but-dim sort of man" and thought that Frank made a habit of walking down the aisle. Papps was still recognised as Frank in public despite mainly playing the role in his teenage years.

== Tom Fletcher ==
Tom Fletcher, played by Roger Oakley, debuted on-screen during the episode airing on 17 January 1988. Ruth Deller of television website Lowculture described patriarch Tom "One of the nicest dad characters in soap, ever". The Soap Show called Tom the "first patriarch of Home and Away."

== Pippa Fletcher ==
Pippa Ross, played by Vanessa Downing, made her first appearance in on 17 January 1988 in the serial's pilot. Downing left the serial in 1990 and Debra Lawrance took over the role from then until 1998 and has subsequently returned to guest star. In 1997, Lawrance quit the role and Pippa departed in 1998. Pippa was placed sixth in TV Week's list of the "Top 10 Aussie TV mums".

== Sally Fletcher ==
Sally Louise Fletcher, played by Kate Ritchie, made her first appearance in the Pilot episode airing on 17 January 1988, departed on 3 April 2008, returned on 15 July 2013 and departed again on 5 September 2013 Ritchie auditioned for the role of Sally in front of executive producer John Holmes in 1987. Her audition scene was all about strawberry jam and Sally's imaginary friend Milco. Ritchie has won various awards for her role as Sally including Most Popular Actress awards in 2006, 2007 and 2008 at The Logie Awards and Most Popular Personality.

== Steven Matheson ==
Steven Matheson, played by Adam Willits, made his first appearance on 17 January 1988 in the serial's pilot. Willits departed in 1991 but returned in 1995 as a regular and remained until 1996 and has made sporadic guest appearances from 1997 to 2008. Willits was offered the role of Steven in 1987 . Willits described Steven's development as slow because he remained "a bit of a dork". He added that Steven was destined for "exciting things". A columnist for Inside Soap said "once the school swat and a bit of a square, he grew up into a egghead who couldn't get a girl. Duller than one of Alf Stewart's bowling club cheese and wine parties, quiet Steven Matheson seemed destined to stay single." Of his return in 1995, they opined Steven no longer had trouble finding a partner but had a "problem" finding one his own age.

== Carly Morris ==
Carly Morris, played by Sharyn Hodgson, made her first appearance on 17 January 1988 in the serial's pilot episode. Hogdson left the serial in 1991 but returned for guest spots in 1997, 2000, 2002 and 2008. Her character Carly's rape was a key factor in the serial's rise in ratings. and was heralded as "very brave territory for a prime-time soap". Hodgson defended the storyline, saying "In Home and Away we show life as it really happens. It's not irresponsible to show attacks, unwanted pregnancies or people turning to alcohol. It's realistic and it shows we are confronting these problems. The thing about having a foster family as the main characters is that they do have trauma in their lives. Seeing how they cope must help people". Hodgson researched the storyline by calling the Rape Crisis Centre, reading articles and watching documentaries.

== Lynn Davenport ==
Lynn Davenport
- Home and Away character
- Portrayed by: Helena Bozich
- First appearance: 17 January 1988
- Last appearance: 25 August 1988
- Introduced by: Alan Bateman
In-universe information
- Occupation: Student
- Father: Barry Davenport
- Mother: Julie Davenport
- Brothers: Andy Davenport; Garry Davenport; Mark Davenport
- Sisters: Rae Davenport; Jane Davenport; Sue Davenport

Lynn Davenport, played by Helena Bozich, made her first appearance on 17 January 1988 in the serial's pilot and departed on 25 August 1988.

Bozich auditioned for the role of Lynn while attending the Johnny Young Talent School. While filming for the series, the actress had a tutor to help her complete her school certificate. In the Home and Away Annual written by Melanie J Clayden, she describes Lynn as being a "mistake" from birth and could never do any right where her parents were concerned. Lynn had run away from home several times due to the tension and arguments between her parents. Lynn was soon placed in care but ran away again and as a result the child services decided to send her to a foster home. Lynn was placed in the care of Pippa (Vanessa Downing) and Tom Fletcher (Roger Oakley); who were experienced in dealing with difficult children. Lynn was later written out of the series as Bozich took a fifteen-week break. The serial's producer Alan Bateman said that the character would have a "very dramatic return". Bateman told a reporter from Sunday Mail TV Plus that a large cast meant that some characters such as Lynn needed to be "rested".

Lynn is the youngest of Barry (Michael Caton) and Julie's (Olivia Brown) seven children. The Davenports treated Lynn so badly that she was put into a children's home at the age of 10, where she befriended Sally (Kate Ritchie). Both Lynn and Sally were fostered by Pippa and Tom Fletcher and the family move to Summer Bay. Lynn runs away from home after Eric, the family's pet dog dies after being poisoned. She hides out on a farm and where befriends an autistic Greek boy, Nico Pappas (Nicholas Papademetriou) who lives with his grandmother. After Lynn is found and the locals accuse Nico of kidnapping her, she is quick to rise to his defence. After Carly Morris (Sharyn Hodgson) is raped and Nico is institutionalised for attacking Donald Fisher (Norman Coburn), Lynn who is a Christian begins to lose her faith in God but later regains it. Barry visits Lynn at the Fletchers and Lynn thinks she may able to go home. However, Carly overhears a conversation between Barry, Tom and Pippa where Barry reveals he and Julie do not have enough time for her but cannot tell Lynn the truth. Several months later, Julie makes a televised appeal for Lynn to return home and she does. Lynn returns shortly after Pippa gives birth to a new-born son, Christopher (Ashleigh Bell-Weir).

== Alf Stewart ==
Alf Stewart portrayed by Ray Meagher. The character debuted on-screen during the serial's pilot episode on 17 January 1988. Meagher is the only remaining original cast member still present. Meagher holds a Guinness World Record as the longest-serving actor in an Australian serial for portraying Alf since 1988. As of 2011 he is the only remaining original cast member still present. In 2010 Meagher took a break from Home and Away, so he could travel to London to star in the West End production of Priscilla Queen of the Desert Hampshire culture website Get Hampshire branded Alf a "legendary misery-guts". They also said he is commonly known for his use of declining Australian slang with sayings such as "flamin' mongrel". For his portrayal of Alf, Meagher was nominated for Most Popular Actor at the 2008 Digital Spy Soap Awards. In 2010, Meagher won the Gold Logie at the Logie Awards.

== Neville McPhee ==
Neville McPhee
- Home and Away character
- Portrayed by: Frank Lloyd
- Duration: 1988–89
- First appearance: 17 January 1988
- Last appearance: 10 March 1989
- Introduced by: Alan Bateman
In-universe information
- Occupation: Retired Circus strongman
- Wife: Floss McPhee (1949–96)
- Sons: Scott McPhee
- Grandsons: Ben McPhee

Neville McPhee, played by Frank Lloyd, first appeared on 17 January 1988 and departed on 10 March 1989. Neville and his wife Floss (Sheila Kennelly) were described as a "funny old pair". Neville and Floss are retired cicus performers who live in their Gypsy Caravan in the Summer Bay Caravan park. They welcome the arrival of The Fletcher Family who have arrive from the city and purchase Summer Bay house and caravan park from Alf Stewart and take over the running of the park, unbeknownst to them Neville is covering for street kid Bobby Simpson (Nicolle Dickson) who is hiding on suspicion of burglary by keeping her hidden in a disused van. His wife Floss, who is a fortune teller warns Neville about Bobby as she senses and tells him that Bobby may cause the death of one of the Fletchers. Neville dismisses this and continues befriending Bobby. When his bagpipes are destroyed, Neville blames Lance Smart (Peter Vroom) and Martin Dibble (Craig Thomson) but the real culprit is Sally Keating (Kate Ritchie), who cut the bagpipe open to let "Mr. Haggis" – a creature Neville told her about- out of the pipe. Floss begins to miss their son, Scott (Peter Ford) and decides to go the city to visit him, Neville refuses to talk to Scott as relations are sour. After Floss learns Scott is overseas and has a son, Ben (Justin Rosniak), she begins posing as a nanny. Neville warns her against this but Floss continues. When Floss brings Ben to Summer Bay, she and Neville are forced to reveal their identities as his grandparents. Ben tells them he wants to live in Summer Bay with them after staying with them for several days. Scott arrives at the caravan park and angrily retrieves Ben. Neville and Floss follow him back to the city and camp out on his lawn, refusing to leave until he speaks to them. In the end, they are forced to leave, breaking Ben's heart. After seeing how upset Floss is on Mother's Day, Neville returns to the city and chastises Scott for not visiting or at least calling Floss. Scott reluctantly agrees and brings his wife Anna (Kate Turner) and Ben to spend the day on the beach with Neville and Floss and the family put the past behind them.

Neville receives an offer from his old ringmaster who gives him job back and he and Floss decide to leave the bay. The McPhees try to make a quiet exit by leaving a note on their caravan and they drive off. The car breaks down and the Fletchers find them and give them an emotional goodbye. They later send a telegram to Carly Morris (Sharyn Hodgson) and Ben Lucini (Julian McMahon) on their wedding day. When Floss returns to Summer Bay in 2000, ahead of Sally's wedding to Kieran Fletcher (Spencer McLaren), she tells her Neville died four years earlier after leading a happy and full life.

== Floss McPhee ==
Floss McPhee, played by Sheila Kennelly, first appeared on 17 January 1988 and departed on 10 March 1989. She made return guest appearances between 2000 and 2008. Kennelly received a fan letter from a viewer in Queensland who had read she lived on a farm in the Hunter Region. The letter arrived in less than a week. Floss and her husband Neville were described by Lucy Clark of The Sun-Herald as "A Funny Old Pair".

== Bobby Simpson ==
Bobby Simpson, portrayed by Nicolle Dickson, first appeared on 17 January 1988 and remained in the series until 1993. Dickson was awarded the Most Popular New Talent at the 1989 Logie Awards for her portrayal of Bobby. and was nominated in the category of "Most Popular Actress" at the 1991 Logie Awards. A columnist for Inside Soap described Bobby as a "tearaway" who eventually became the "pillar of the community".

== Donald Fisher ==
Donald Fisher, played by Norman Coburn, made his first appearance on 17 January 1988. Coburn's long-running portrayal of Fisher earned him a place in the 2002 Guinness World Records alongside cast mates Ray Meagher and Kate Ritchie.

== Ailsa Stewart ==
Ailsa Stewart, played by Judy Nunn, made her first appearance on 17 January 1988 and remained in the serial until 2000. The character has been described as a "much-loved maternal disciplinarian".

== Martin Dibble ==
Martin Dibble, portrayed by Craig Thomson, made his first on-screen appearance on 17 January 1988, the show's pilot episode and left the show on 3 April 1990. Thomson landed the role after appearing in a soft drink advertisement. Robyn Harvey from The Sydney Morning Herald opined that Martin was just "a big dag". A columnist Daily Record branded Martin and Lance Smart the "thickest characters ever to grace soapland" by a columnist from the Daily Record.

== Lance Smart ==
Lance Smart, portrayed by Peter Vroom, made his first appearance on 17 January 1988 and departed on 11 April 1990. Vroom made subsequent returns throughout the 2000s. Lucy Clark of The Sun-Herald described Lance and Martin as "Two surfie blokes who are thick as two short planks". Clive Hopwood wrote in his book Home and Away Special that Lance lacked enough intelligence that he had "difficulty knowing which way round to sit on a bicycle.

== Matt Wilson ==
Matt Wilson, played by Greg Benson, made his first appearance on 17 January 1988. Benson was initially credited as "Surfer" in the serial's pilot episode before joining the show on an episodic basis as Matt. Clive Hopwood praised Benson for his portrayal of Matt saying it was "Natural" and no surprise that he took to the role "like a duck or, rather a lifeguard, to water.

== Roo Stewart ==
Roo Stewart, originally played by Justine Clarke, currently played by Georgie Parker, made her first on-screen appearance on 20 January 1988. Clarke originally auditioned for the roles of Carly Morris, Lynn Davenport and Bobby Simpson; but was unsuccessful each time. The producers later invited Clarke to audition for the role of Roo, which she won. Clarke told a reporter from TV Life that she was "really pleased" because she though Roo was a "great character". Ausculture named Roo fifth on their Top Ten Aussie Soap Villains list. They called Roo "evil" for trying to break up Alf's relationship with Ailsa, lying to and trying to marry Frank, leaving him at the altar and later having an affair with him. Andrew Mercado described Roo as Alf Stewart's (Ray Meagher) "Minxy teenage daughter" in his book, Super Aussie soaps: behind the scenes of Australia's best loved TV shows.

== Celia Stewart ==
Celia Stewart, played by Fiona Spence, made her first on-screen appearance on 26 January 1988 and remained until 20 April 1990, following Spence's decision to leave. Spence reprised her role as Celia in 2005 for the serial's 4000th episode based around Alf Stewart's (Ray Meagher) 60th birthday. In 2012, Spence's management announced that she had reprised her role and returned to Home and Away. Celia is described as a "gossip" and a "busybody" . Andrew Mercado wrote in his book, Super Aussie Soaps, that she was a "prudish" character. Spence herself, described Celia as "very vulnerable".

== Colleen Smart ==
Colleen Smart, played by Lyn Collingwood, made her first appearance on 7 March 1988 and departed 23 May 2012. Colleen was introduced into the serial as a recurring character in 1988 until 1989. Colleen mainly served as a source of comic relief and acted as the busybody type character. Colleen was reintroduced again in 1999 with Collingwood reprising the role. Collingwood was nominated at the 2007 Inside Soap Awards in the category of "Funniest Performance" for her portrayal of Colleen.

== Kerry Barlow ==
Kerry Barlow
- Home and Away character
- Portrayed by: Liddy Clark
- First appearance: 9 March 1988
- Last appearance: 15 April 1988
- Introduced by: Alan Bateman
In-universe information
- Husband: Sam Barlow
- Daughters: Sandra Barlow

Kerry Barlow, played by Liddy Clark, debuted on-screen during the episode airing on 9 March 1988 and remained until 15 April 1988.

When Home and Away started gaining viewers over the evening news airing on a rival channel, the Seven Network planned ways to keep the viewers interested. In the book Home and Away: Behind the Scenes; James Oram said that "special episodes" were promoted via "intensive campaigns" on the channel, with the most successful being a domestic violence storyline which featured Kerry. The character becomes a victim to her husband, Sam Barlow's (Jeff Truman) alcohol-fuelled anger. The storyline aired at a time when the Australian government published a report detailing that one in five nationals thought it was okay to beat women. Clark felt "appalled" while portraying the issue. She told Oram that she found playing Kerry "a very frightening experience". The actress had never played a victim before and she found it so distressing that she ruled out playing a similar role in the future. She said that it was "important to note" that her character was beat up as a result of Sam drinking to excess. Clark added her belief that alcohol was one of the main contributors to domestic violence.

Kerry is Sam's wife and the mother of their daughter Sandra (Catherine McColl-Jones). When Sam is demoted at work, he takes his frustrations out on Kerry and Sandra physically, resulting in both being hospitalised. Kerry is then used by Sam to hold Sandra prisoner in her room. Kerry helps Sandra escape and she contacts Sergeant Bob Barnett (Rob Baxter) who tries to apprehend Sam. Sam disarms Barnett and takes his gun, holding him and Kerry hostage. Tom Fletcher (Roger Oakley), Steven Matheson (Adam Willits) and Ailsa Hogan (Judy Nunn) arrive. Tom tries to disarm Sam after he points the gun at Sandra but Kerry is killed in the process. She was the first person to die on Home and Away

== Narelle Smart ==
Narelle Smart, played by Amanda Newman-Phillips, debuted on-screen during the episode airing on 25 March 1988. Newman-Phillip's role garnered her recognition as one of the most famous soap stars in the United Kingdom and she was tipped by her agent to replace Kylie Minogue of Neighbours as the "number one" soap star.

== Brett Macklin ==
Brett Macklin
- Home and Away character
- Portrayed by: Gerry Sont
- Duration: 1988, 2005
- First appearance: 11 April 1988
- Last appearance: 1 June 2005
- Introduced by: Alan Bateman (1988); Julie McGuaran (2005)
- Book appearances: Family Matters; Summer Bay Blues; Scandal at Summer Bay
In-universe information
- Occupation: Businessman
- Father: Gordon Macklin
- Mother: Mrs. Macklin
- Sisters: Stacey Macklin
- Daughters: Martha MacKenzie
- Granddaughters: Lindsay MacKenzie

Brett Macklin, played by Gerry Sont, made his first appearance on-screen during the episode airing on 11 April 1988. Sont returned to filming in 2005 and was involved in a storyline with the character of Josie Russell (Laurie Foell).

Brett begins dating Roo Stewart (Justine Clarke) after her father Alf Stewart (Ray Meagher) sends her to Boarding School in Sydney. When Frank Morgan (Alex Papps) arrives to visit Roo, he sees Brett and punches him. Brett soon learns Roo is pregnant and tells her to have an abortion but she refuses and runs away. Brett later learns of Roo's plan to convince Frank to marry her and pass the child off as his. Brett then tells Roo that a recent case of the mumps has left him infertile and conspires with her aunt Morag Bellingham (Cornelia Frances) to get custody of the child. In the aftermath of Frank and Roo's failed wedding, Brett and Morag try to convince Roo to surrender custody to him but she lies and tells them she aborted the child. Brett then involves his lawyers and provokes the ire of Alf, who punches him just before a discussion at Morag's house. Brett agrees to call off legal proceedings if he is a part of the child's life. Morag hosts a dinner party and Brett tries to get Alf and his sister Celia Stewart (Fiona Spence) onside with a business proposition for an investment into a development his family are planning. Brett offers Frank a job and he accepts. Frank then does some digging to expose evidence Brett's resort development of being a fraud. Brett then causes problems between Alf and Ailsa. Bobby Simpson (Nicolle Dickson) publicly humiliates Brett in revenge by accepting a date but getting together with Frank.

Brett conspires with Roo to fake her labour but her contractions begin for real. Brett's father Gordon (Ron Haddrick) arrives when the baby is born but refuses to have anything with the child because she is female and berates Brett. Brett falls into a depression after being cut off by Gordon and books into the Caravan Park. His sister, Stacey (Sandie Lillingston) arrives to take over the business. Brett then decides he wants custody of his daughter Martha MacKenzie (Burcin Kapkin) and blackmails Roo into handing her over by threatening to stop the development meaning, Alf and every other investor in the Bay will lose their money. Roo reluctantly complies. Brett then grabs Martha and flees to Melbourne with Stacey and Philip Matheson (John Morris) in hot pursuit. Philip tries to stop Brett but he slams his hand in the car door causing permanent damage. While on the run, Brett struggles to cope with Martha and is forced to take her to a hospital. The police are called and Martha is returned to Roo. Brett and Roo decide neither of them are capable of raising the child and agree to put Martha up for adoption.

Brett tries to apologise to Phillip but he refuses to accept his apology. Brett then contemplates suicide but is stopped by Jeff Samuels (Alex Petersons). After a long chat with Stacey, he decides to leave. Brett resurfaces when Martha, now 18 years old, tries to get in contact with him after rejecting an earlier attempt. Brett becomes involved with Josie romantically and professionally to develop a new resort on the Caravan Park. Brett is unaware Josie is working to bring down his shady dealings and when he realises, he tries to kill her by shoving her off a cliff and he is arrested as a result.

== Morag Bellingham ==
Morag Bellingham, played by Cornelia Frances, made her first on-screen appearance on 7 June 1988. Frances has played the role of Morag on a recurrent basis over twenty-three years Emily Dunn writing for The Sydney Morning Herald branded Morag a "fearsome judge". The Sunday Mercury branded her as "the frightening Morag". Whilst the Sunday Mail call her a "tough lawyer". Keily Oakes writing for the BBC stated that Frances is "known to many Australians as the feisty Morag." In his book, Super Aussie Soaps, Andrew Mercado describes Morag as the "snooty sister" out of the Stewart siblings.

== Barbara Stewart ==
Barbara Stewart
- Home and Away character
- Portrayed by: Barbara Stephens (1988–1989, 2005); Rona McLeod (1996); Ann Fay (2010 flashback); Charlie Wynne (2010 flashback)
- Duration: 1988–1989, 1996, 2005, 2010
- First appearance: 1 June 1988
- Last appearance: 30 June 2010
- Introduced by: Alan Bateman (1988); Des Monaghan (1989); John Holmes (1996); Julie McGuaran (2005)
In-universe information
- Occupation: Teacher
- Father: Gordon Stewart
- Mother: Sarah-Jane Stewart
- Brothers: Alf Stewart
- Sisters: Morag Bellingham; Celia Stewart; Debra Stewart
- Half-sisters: Colleen Smart
- Husband: Donald Fisher (1970s–1984)
- Sons: Alan Fisher
- Daughters: Rebecca Nash
- Grandsons: Seb Miller
- Nephews: Lance Smart; Owen Dalby; Duncan Stewart
- Nieces: Maureen Evans; Roo Stewart; Quinn Jackson; Bobby Simpson

Barbara Stewart (previously Fisher) is the ex-wife of Donald Fisher (Norman Coburn), sister to Alf, Morag, Celia and Debra and mother of Alan (Simon Kay) and Rebecca Fisher (Jane Hall). Barbara Stephens originated the role in 1988 and returned in 1989. Rona McLeod briefly took over the role when the character returned to the serial. In 2005 as a part of Alf's 60th birthday celebrations, Stephens reprised the role. Ann Fay portrayed a younger Barbara in flashbacks in 1989. In 2010, in a flashback to Alf's childhood, a young Barbara was portrayed by Charlie Wynne.

Barbara is first seen on the phone to ex-husband Donald, to say she will be attending of the wedding of her niece Roo (Justine Clarke) to Frank Morgan (Alex Papps). Barbara is unable to attend as Alan is involved in a surfing accident. The following week, Barbara arrives in Summer Bay and announces she has landed a job at the local High School where Donald works, much to his chagrin. They clash over various issues. They eventually make peace and Donald invites Barbara to dinner, but she assumes he is only trying to get back together with her and leaves again. More arguments ensue as Barbara enrols Alan into year twelve, and then reveals to Donald he has an inoperable Brain tumour. After Alan's misbehaviour becomes too much, Barbara throws him out but forgives him when he tries to build bridges with those he has hurt. When Alan dies, Barbara and Donald continue clashing but make their peace. Barbara leaves for the city and tells Donald part of her will always love him. In early 1989, Bobby Simpson (Nicolle Dickson) confronts Barbara assuming she is her biological mother and asks why she gave her away. Barbara tells her she is not her real mother. Several years later Barbara returns to the bay at the same time Donald is experiencing strange things happening at home. It emerges that Barbara is trying to kill him to obtain his life savings. Rebecca (now played by Belinda Emmett) discovers the truth and Barbara is arrested and later committed to a mental institution. Alf shortly disowns her but they reconcile when she returns for his sixtieth birthday party in 2005.

== Alan Fisher ==
Alan Fisher
- Home and Away character
- Portrayed by: Simon Bossell
- First appearance: 4 July 1988
- Last appearance: 1 September 1988
- Introduced by: Alan Bateman
In-universe information
- Occupation: Student
- Father: Donald Fisher
- Mother: Barbara Stewart
- Sisters: Rebecca Nash
- Half-brothers: Byron Fisher
- Half-sisters: Bobby Simpson
- Sons: Seb Miller
- Grandfathers: Gordon Stewart
- Grandmothers: Isobel DuPre; Sarah-Jane Stewart
- Uncles: Clive Fisher; Alf Stewart
- Aunts: Mary Croft; Colleen Smart; Morag Bellingham; Celia Stewart; Debra Stewart
- First cousins: David Croft; Lucinda Croft; Maureen Evans; Lance Smart; Owen Dalby; Quinn Jackson; Roo Stewart; Duncan Stewart

Alan Donald Fisher, played by Simon Kay, debuted on-screen during the episode airing on 4 July 1988. In the book Home and Away: Behind the Scenes; James Oram describes Alan as a "confused adolescent who wanted nothing more than the love and respect of his father". The writer added that Kay had the looks that placed Alan into the "heart-throb department". Alan's storylines included a brief dalliance with Bobby Simpson (Nicolle Dickson) and his death from a brain haemorrhage. The serial's writing team decided to kill Alan off to create "dramatic content". Norman Coburn, who plays Alan's father Donald Fisher, told Oram that he was disappointed that Alan was killed off. Coburn said that he was "sorry" that Alan was written out because he felt that Kay was a "damned fine little actor". He added that he would have been an asset to Home and Away if he had stayed. Coburn claimed that the producers realised that Alan was a good character and regretted killing him off, but said there was no plausible way for him to return. However, the serial's writers wanted to reintroduce Kay and began thinking of a solution; eventually creating a way for him to return. Kay told Oram that it would have seen Donald writing a book about Alan's life and a film being made from it. After a search for an actor to play his son, Donald would meet a man identical to Alan and be played by Kay. The actor added that he would have needed to have "very serious talks" with producers if he were to return in the future.

Alan arrives in Summer Bay much to the disapproval of his father Donald, as their relationship is strained. He makes a move on Bobby, much to her displeasure until she remembers who he is. Alan enrols in year twelve at Summer Bay High where his parents are teaching and Donald threatens to expel him should he misbehave. Alan and Bobby's friendship riles Donald. It soon emerges Alan's is suffering from a inoperable brain aneurysm that could cause a haemorrhage at any time. Carly Morris (Sharyn Hodgson) overhears and soon the news is common knowledge. Alan blames Donald for this and punches him during school. In revenge, Alan begins acting up even more by wearing dusty school jumpers and even the dress worn by the female pupils. This culminates in a situation where Alan goads Donald into hitting him in front of witnesses by pretending to collapse. The education department temporarily suspend Donald. When the truth emerges, Alan's mother, Barbara (Barbara Stephens) throws Alan out. Alan apologises to everyone he has hurt and forms an uneasy truce with Donald and drops out of school to pursue a career as professional surfer. Donald is glad his son is showing ambition for something and arranges for him to receive a sponsorship offer. When Alan finds out what his father has done, he is grateful and tries to find him to clear the air, however he never makes it as the aneurysm erupts and Alan collapses and is rushed to hospital. He falls into a coma and is parents are told he has suffered severe brain damage. The decision is taken to switch Alan's life support machine off as he has suffers a seizure in the night and is declared brain dead. Alan's video will is made and he requests a surf-style funeral to be held with "Wipe Out" by The Surfaris playing and his ashes to be scattered at sea by a surfer. Alan's final request to Donald, have his novel "On the Crest of a Wave" – a journal he made since arriving in the bay- to be published. The book is later published and finds its way onto the Syllabus at Summer Bay High in 1999 and Donald is approached by producer Roger Lansdowne (Tony Bonner) about selling the film rights. In 2001, Seb Miller (Mitch Firth), a teenager arrives in Summer Bay after learning from his mother, Anna (Elizabeth Maywald) that Alan was his father and Donald is his grandfather. This is confirmed after DNA testing.

== Revhead ==
Revhead
- Home and Away character
- Portrayed by: Gavin Harrison
- Duration: 1988–1989, 1991
- First appearance: 16 August 1988
- Last appearance: 23 August 1991
- Introduced by: Alan Bateman (1988); Des Monaghan (1991)
In-universe information
- Other names: Morris Gibson
- Occupation: Panel worker (1988); Boatshed Assistant (1991)
- Father: Alec Gibson
- Sisters: Julie Gibson

Morris Henry "Revhead" Gibson, played by Gavin Harrison, debuted on-screen during the episode airing on 16 August 1988. Harrison has played the character during three separate stints. To secure the role of Revhead, Harrison was required to look "rough" and did not shave for six months.

The actor explained to Lisa Anthony from BIG! that it took him six weeks to grow stubble, so he had to refrain from shaving for the six-month period. He did not like having facial hair for the role and he eventually "got fed up with it". Harrison was unsure as to why he was selected to play Revhead, he added "I really don't know why BIG!, I really don't". But he did enjoy playing the role because it was different from his own persona. Harrison told Kesta Desmond and David Nicholls for their book Home and Away Annual that the worst thing about the serial was his character's nickname "Revhead". He described the character as a "trouble maker and a lout". Harrison revealed that it was not until the third time he returned to play Revhead, that he understood why he acts the way he does. Revhead's behaviour was caused by "a big tragic event" that happened to his family two years before his arrival. Harrison said that Revhead's father, Alec (David Baldwyn) used to give him plenty of attention, then his mother died in an accident and his sister, Julie (Naomi Watts) was left "crippled". His father's attention was diverted to caring for Julie. He added that Revhead "was actually a really nice guy, but he's made up this big facade". Harrison told John Kercher in the Home and Away Annual that he "loved playing a real baddy".

Tom Etherington from TV Week said that Revhead was the serial's "biggest troublemaker" during 1991. The character "didn't do anything by the book, so his head nearly exploded" when he discovers that his sister Julie is having a relationship with police officer Nick Parrish (Bruce Roberts). Etherington added that Revhead "tried his best" to separate the pair "without much luck". BIG!'s Anthony said that Revhead's behaviour consisted of "moods, trantrums, scheming, or his ability to get friends into trouble". She added that "clean-cut, tanned and relaxed, Gavin is so different from the rebellious Revhead, who has the police after him, that you wonder why he was chosen for the part."

Revhead begins a relationship with Karen Dean (Belinda Jarrett) and they commit a robbery at Alf Stewart's (Ray Meagher) grocery store. In the scenes Revhead is forced to bash Alf over the head and steals money from the till. In the buildup to his exit storyline Revhead and Karen crash their car into David Croft (Guy Pearce) and he is killed. In his book Super Aussie Soap, Andrew Mercado said that Revhead actually "felt bad" about what he had done because the cause of Julie's physical disability.

Revhead is first seen when he and his friends hassle Steven Matheson (Adam Willits) and Narelle Smart (Amanda Newman-Phillips) on their date at a drive-in in Yabbie Creek. Steven is able to fight them off. Revhead then returns with his friends and begins hassling Roo Stewart (Justine Clarke), Bobby Simpson (Nicolle Dickson) and Carly Morris (Sharyn Hodgson). The girls are outnumbered four to three until Adam Cameron (Mat Stevenson) arrives and steals Revhead's car to distract him and his gang. Revhead and his friend Skid (Chris Harding) take revenge on Adam by trashing his Yacht. Revhead is then involved in a minor crash when Emma Jackson (Dannii Minogue) and Viv Newton (Mouche Phillips) bump into his new car. Revhead demands payment and threatens to inform Alf Stewart of the girls' driving his Range Rover if they do not pay up. Bobby then devises a plan to stall Revhead and Skid at the diner and has Lance Smart (Peter Vroom) and Martin Dibble (Craig Thomson) fix the dent in the car in secret. The plan is successful and the girls avoid payment, much to the irritation of Revhead and Skid.

Revhead reappears eighteen months later after learning of his sister Julie's relationship with police officer Nick Parrish and tries to split them up. He then becomes involved with Karen Dean and leads her off the rails by encouraging her to skip school and smoke dope with him. He leaves town for several months but returns and hides out in his old house, which is to be sold and asks Karen to keep quiet. Revhead reveals that he robbed a pharmacy in the city and left a security guard in a coma and is on the run. After being arrested and bailed, Revhead encourages Karen to help him steal to fund their getaway and then arranges a robbery on Alf's store, which goes awry when Alf is injured in the process. With the police looking for him, Revhead tells Karen to steal the car belonging to her brother Blake (Les Hill) and Haydn Ross (Andrew Hill) and meet him on Yabbie Creek road in order to flee town. The plan backfires when Karen crashes the car, killing David. Revhead panics when he learns about the accident, dumps Karen and flees town alone but is arrested in the city and jailed for his crimes.

== Philip Matheson ==
Philip Matheson
- Home and Away character
- Portrayed by: John Morris
- Duration: 1988–1989
- First appearance: 18 August 1988
- Last appearance: 26 April 1989
- Introduced by: Alan Bateman
- Book appearances: Summer Bay Blues; Scandal at Summer Bay
In-universe information
- Occupation: Doctor
- Brothers: Brett Matheson
- Nephews: Steven Matheson

Philip Matheson, played by John Morris, made his first appearance on-screen during the episode airing on 18 August 1988 and departed on 26 April 1989.

When the serial began; it mainly attracted younger audience and featured stories that were relevant to them. While producers were happy with their audience, they wanted to attract older viewers too. As a result, the character of Philip was created. Series producer Alan Bateman told Kesta Desmond for his Home and Away Annual that "we’ve been trying to introduce elements that will appeal to the eighteen plus age group". Morris was one of 150 actors that auditioned for the role and was eventually cast. Morris told Desmond that he was "rapt" to join the serial and branded Philip as the "biggest role" he could have played.

Morris' casting was publicised on 7 August 1988, just more than week before his character's debut on-screen. Bateman was delighted with Morris' casting and hoped he would become the show's main star. He told a reporter from Sunday Mail TV Plus that "John is going to be a massive hit. He's a very good looking man and very nice performer and will be a bigger star than Kylie Minogue." Morrison told James Oram in the book Home and Away: Behind the Scenes that he had little acting experience beforehand and was proud of himself for securing the role. Philip is the "long lost" uncle of Steven Matheson (Adam Willits) and only intends to stay for a short time. However, he secures employment at the local hospital and becomes involved with Stacey Macklin (Sandie Lillingston).

Morris later decided to leave the serial and asked the producers to kill Philip off. He told Clive Hopwood in the book Home and Away Special that "I planned my own character's end, but I wanted it to be final, with no chance of some future resurrection." However, Morris was "a little taken aback" when he read the scripts for Philip's exit. The character is trapped inside Celia Stewart's (Fiona Spence) store when it blows up because of arsonist Dodge (Kelly Dingwall). Morris quipped "you can't get much more final than that. I'd like to see anyone bring that character back." His death affected many of the residents of Summer Bay, including Carly Morris (Sharyn Hodgson) and Bobby Simpson (Nicolle Dickson); who Philip had helped through their issues. The character had become popular with viewers. Morris told Murray Clifford Evening Times that Philip was the "first long-established character to be killed off". He revealed that the studio was "swamped" with telephone calls from "distressed fans" and Morris also had thousands of fan letters. He added that his female fans could not believe that their "favourite doctor" had died. Some even protested and sent wreaths to the studio. Morris said that if he had realised the extent of Philip's popularity, he would have asked for the door to be left open for a future return.

Philip arrives in Summer Bay to help Steven come to terms with the first anniversary of his parents' deaths. As a doctor, he assists with the birth of Pippa Fletcher's (Vanessa Downing) baby Christopher (Ashley-Bell Weir). Philip lodges with Frank Morgan (Alex Papps) and Narelle Smart (Amanda Newman-Phillips) in the flat above the General store. Philip tries to woo Stacey but she keeps turning him down. When Stacey's brother, Brett (Gerry Sont) steals money from the Macklin office safe and tries to flee with his new-born daughter Martha (Burcin Kapkin), Philip and Stacey chase after him. Philip overtakes Brett and tries to get Martha from the car, but Brett slams the door on his hand, severing tendons and gets away. Philip is then forced to face the reality that his dreams of being a surgeon are over.

Philip and Stacey finally get together after a date. They team up to investigate Gary Samuels (Darius Perkins) and find he is responsible for his parents' deaths. When Gary is cornered, he plays a suicide trick on them by pretending to jump off a cliff and takes the story to the local papers and paints Philip and Stacey in a bad light. Philip is a suspect when Gary's body is found at the bottom of the same cliff he pretended to jump from but is cleared when it is revealed that Gary fell after trying the same trick on Carly.

Philip decides to leave Summer Bay to aid his career but Stacey refuses to leave with him. He returns several weeks after Christmas and is dismayed to learn Stacey is engaged to Nicholas Walsh (Robert Taylor). However, Philip refuses to give up and Stacey breaks up with Nicholas. Philip later proposes, but Stacey's father Gordon (Ron Haddrick) disapproves as he thinks Philip is not rich enough. Philip, overhearing their conversation, decides to postpone plans. Stacey is shocked when she discovers she may be pregnant. This is found to be a mistake as her blood test was mixed up. The couple then reaffirm their engagement. Philip arrives home while the store is set alight by Dodge who has a grudge against the owner, Celia. Philip dies in the fire and his body is recovered, leaving Stacey and Steven devastated. Dodge is later imprisoned and serves five years for the crime.

== Christopher Fletcher ==
Christopher Fletcher
- Home and Away character
- Portrayed by: Ashleigh Bell-Weir (1988); Dylan McCready (1988–92); Shaun Wood (1992–98); Rian McLean (2003)
- Duration: 1988–98, 2003
- First appearance: 22 August 1988
- Last appearance: 3 July 2003
- Introduced by: Alan Bateman (1988); Julie McGuaran (2003)
In-universe information
- Father: Tom Fletcher
- Mother: Pippa Ross
- Adoptive father: Michael Ross
- Stepfather: Ian Routledge
- Brothers: Haydn Ross (adoptive)
- Sisters: Sally Fletcher (adoptive)
- Half-brothers: Dale Ross
- Grandfathers: Bert King
- Grandmothers: Coral King
- Uncles: Danny King

Christopher Daniel Fletcher (previously Ross) is the son of Tom (Roger Oakley) and Pippa Fletcher (Vanessa Downing). He first appeared on 22 August 1988 following his birth. The role was played by four different actors: Ashleigh Bell-Weir originated the role; he was replaced by Dylan McCready who portrayed Christopher until 1992; Shaun Wood began playing Christopher until his departure in 1998; Rian McLean was cast in the role when Christopher made a brief return in 2003.

Christopher is born to Tom and Pippa as their first biological child. When Christopher is two years old, Tom dies of a heart attack. Pippa marries Michael Ross the following year and he adopts Christopher. As Christopher grows he forms a close bond with his foster siblings and his adoptive sister, Sally (Kate Ritchie). Christopher becomes friends with Duncan Stewart (Lewis Devaney) and they both get into scrapes together, including a situation where both explore a derelict building which is unstable following a recent earthquake. The house collapses and they are trapped but are eventually found. A year after Michael's death, Pippa meets Ian Routledge (Patrick Dickson) and he asks her to move away with him but she turns him down at first. Several months later Ian returns and Pippa and Christopher move away to the Carrington Ranges with him. In 2003, Christopher and Pippa return for Sally's wedding to local doctor Flynn Saunders (Joel McIlroy). Pippa briefly mentions to Irene Roberts (Lynne McGranger) that Christopher is gay. This causes problems with Nick Smith (Chris Egan), Irene's foster son, who thinks Chris is trying to make a move on him by acting kind toward him. Chris tries to kiss Seb Miller (Mitch Firth) and is left embarrassed and runs away. Seb later explains that it is okay for Chris to be who he was and Alf Stewart (Ray Meagher) tells Chris, if Tom were around he would be proud of that Christopher would have the courage to be who he is. After resolving things, Chris returns home to Pippa and Ian.

== Stacey Macklin ==
Stacey Macklin
- Home and Away character
- Portrayed by: Sandie Lillingston
- Duration: 1988–1989
- First appearance: 8 September 1988
- Last appearance: 3 November 1989
- Introduced by: Alan Bateman
- Book appearances: Summer Bay Blues; Scandal at Summer Bay
In-universe information
- Occupation: Property developer with the Macklin Corporation
- Father: Gordon Macklin
- Mother: Mrs. Macklin
- Brothers: Brett Macklin
- Nieces: Martha MacKenzie

Stacey Macklin, played by Sandie Lillingston, debuted on-screen during the episode airing on 8 September 1988. Producer Alan Bateman decided to introduce Stacey amidst a small cast "reshuffle". Stacey was described as a "young business woman" and love interest of the newly introduced "heart-throb" Philip Matheson (John Morris). A reporter from TV Life described Stacey as a "ruthless business woman" who is in charge of a property development in Summer Bay. In the Home and Away Annual, Kesta Desmond said that as the children of Gordon Macklin (Ron Haddrick), Stacey and her brother Brett (Gerry Sont) were in charge of negotiating the rights to build in the area. Stacey is "cool-headed" in her approach to business, while Brett struggles to live up to his father's expectations. Sian Watkins of The Age observed that Stacey "can be a real nasty piece of work in the office".

Stacey arrives in Summer Bay, following the birth of her niece, Martha MacKenzie (Burcin Kapkin). She effectively takes over the management of the Development project after Gordon fires Brett. Philip takes an interest in Stacey but she is busy with work. When Brett goes off the rails and kidnaps Martha, Stacey and Philip and chase him and catch up with him, but he injures Philip in the process costing him his career as a surgeon. This sours things between Philip and Stacey for a while after Philip refuses to forgive Brett. Jeff Samuels (Alex Petersons) asks Stacey out and she accepts, however, he bores her on their date. Philip finds out and is jealous and takes out Stacey's secretary Alison Patterson (Kathryn Ridley) in revenge. When several of Stacey's cheques are missing, she suspects Jeff's brother, Gary Samuels (Darius Perkins) and does some investigating about him by getting closer to Jeff and visiting one of Gary's old nightspots.

Stacey and Philip become closer after trying to expose Gary. They soon learn he was responsible for his parents deaths five years earlier. When cornered, Gary admits it was an accident and jumps off a high cliff only to land a smaller one scaring them. Gary later takes his story to the paper making Philip and Stacey look bad. Gary dies for real after falling off the same cliff after trying the same trick on Carly Morris (Sharyn Hodgson). Jeff repays Stacey the money before leaving the Bay.

Philip decides he needs to move to the city to further his medical career and he asks her to leave with him but she refuses. Philip leaves without but quickly returns. He proposes to Stacey but she rejects him, saying she has already agreed to marry her father's friend Nicholas Walsh (Robert Taylor). Philip refuses to give up and Stacey realises she still loves him and dumps Nicholas and exposes his shady dealings. Stacey and Philip get engaged but they are met with resistance from Stacey's father, Gordon who does not see Philip as good enough. Gordon fires Stacey after learning she is pregnant but when it emerges there was a mix up with her blood test, he offers her the job back but Stacey wants an apology. Gordon refuses and she cuts him out of her life. Stacey and Philip move in with Frank Morgan (Alex Papps) and Bobby Simpson (Nicolle Dickson) at the flat above the general store but this arrangement fails when Stacey and Bobby clash. They manage to work out their differences and Stacey moves out. When the store is firebombed, Philip is killed in the fire and Stacey is left devastated. Gordon arrives to comfort her and they reconcile. Stacey then throws herself into her work. She then takes Andrew Foley (Peter Bensley) into the city and agrees to help him set up his youth project there. Andrew returns to Summer Bay and Stacey offers him a room at her place.

Nina Olivera (Raquel Suartzman), an old friend of Stacey's arrives in town and asks for her help in a new venture; a record company. She approaches Lance Smart (Peter Vroom), Martin Dibble (Craig Thomson) and Marilyn Chambers (Emily Symons) and they form a band named Image. Stacey refuses at first but changes her mind. Morag Bellingham (Cornelia Frances) points out a contract clause that entitles Nina to whatever earnings she wants from the group. Image perform at the Sands Resort's opening but it is a disaster after Lance sabotages things. Nina then leaves. Andrew argues with Stacey about using Lance and Martin but it results in them kissing.

Stacey and Andrew later become engaged but the relationship is tested when Andrew offers his friend, Mick (Bruce Samazan) drug addict a place to stay as part of his Youth Counselling business. Stacey's ring goes missing and Mick is blamed but Andrew later reveals he took it to get it tighten as Stacey complained about it being loose. Mick attacks Stacey and trashes the house, leaving her shaken. Andrew refuses to give up on being a counsellor, which causes the relationship to break down. Stacey, after receiving a job offer from Nina in Los Angeles, bids a tearful farewell to Andrew and leaves Summer Bay.

== Martha MacKenzie ==
Martha MacKenzie made her first on-screen appearance on 9 September 1988. Jodi Gordon has earned numerous nominations for her portrayal of Martha including Logie Awards in 2006 and 2009 for "Most Popular New Female Talent" and "Most Popular Actress", respectively. Gordon was also nominated for "Sexiest Female" and "Best Storyline" for Jack and Martha's wedding day at the 2007 Inside Soap Awards. The following year, Gordon was again nominated for "Sexiest Female", she also received a nomination for "Best Couple" along with co-star Paul O'Brien.

== Gary Samuels ==
Gary Samuels
- Home and Away character
- Portrayed by: Darius Perkins
- First appearance: 5 October 1988
- Last appearance: 14 November 1988
- Introduced by: Des Monaghan
In-universe information
- Father: Clyde Samuels
- Mother: Rose Samuels
- Brothers: Jeff Samuels

Gary Samuels, played by Darius Perkins, made his first appearance on 5 October 1988. Perkins was contracted for seven weeks and admitted that he found the role challenging. He told Leigh Reinhold of TV Week: "It's great to be working again. My character is fascinating. On the surface he comes across as Mr Nice Guy but underneath he's quite mixed up." Perkins also described Gary as "a psychotic sociopath", which he found interesting to play. He joked that he had more depth than his Neighbours character Scott Robinson. Gary is initially mistaken for Carly Morris's (Sharyn Hodgson) rapist, but when he is cleared, Carly develops feelings for him and they begin dating. However, she assumes that Gary wants "a permanent girlfriend", but he has other ideas. Perkins stated "Gary is using Carly, but that's the way to treat everyone as far as he's concerned." Gary manipulates Carly by making her feel guilty about accusing him of raping her. The character was later killed-off and his death sparked a whodunnit mystery. Gary dies after falling from a cliff and the police initially suspect it was a suicide. However, forensic evidence points to murder and four established characters are named as prime suspects.

Gary is Jeff Samuels' (Alex Petersons) younger brother. When Gary arrives in Summer Bay, Carly Morris accuses him of being her rapist, but Jeff gives him an alibi. The real rapist is caught and Carly apologises and they begin dating. Gary's true nature is uncovered when he conducts dodgy business deals and cons several Summer Bay residents out of their money, including Lance Smart (Peter Vroom). He then arranges a spate of burglaries while everyone participates in the fun run, one of which goes awry, leaving Bobby Simpson (Nicolle Dickson) injured. Stacey Macklin (Sandie Lillingston) and Philip Matheson (John Morris) learn that Gary was responsible for his parents deaths in a car accident. Gary then pretends to jump off a cliff but lands on a smaller cliff, scaring them. Several days later, Alf Stewart (Ray Meagher) witnesses Gary fall to his death and a murder investigation is held. Many residents are under suspicion. After one of her earrings is found at the scene; Carly confesses that she spoke to Gary and he fell to his death after trying to scare her like he did to Stacey and Philip.

== Al Simpson ==
Al Simpson
- Home and Away character
- Portrayed by: George Leppard (1988); Terence Donovan (1990)
- Duration: 1988, 1990
- First appearance: 29 November 1988
- Last appearance: 1 March 1990
- Introduced by: Des Monaghan
- Book appearances: The Bobby Simpson Story
In-universe information
- Wife: Doris Simpson (backstory)
- Daughters: Sophie Simpson
- Adoptive daughters: Bobby Simpson
- Grandsons: David Simpson
- Granddaughters: Tamara Simpson

Al Simpson, played by George Leppard, made his first appearance on 29 November 1988. The character appears when Bobby Simpson (Nicolle Dickson) and Frank Morgan (Alex Papps) visit him in prison to discuss her paternity, after Al reveals that she is not his daughter. When the character was reintroduced in 1990, Terence Donovan was cast in the role for a six-week stint. Donovan began filming for Home and Away on 23 October 1989. Al was billed as a "dastardly character". Donovan said that was playing a "great role". He described Al as "a jailbird, a wife beater and a drunk". However, Donovan said that he intentionally played him as a "loveable villain". David Brown of TV Week reported that in the storyline Al and his wife Doris raised Bobby until Doris died and Al abandoned her. Al was physically abusive towards both Doris and Bobby. He was later imprisoned for nine years after taking part in an armed robbery. After his release he tracks down his teenage daughter Sophie Simpson (Rebekah Elmaloglou), who is the product of an extramarital affair, and removes her from her foster home.

Donovan liked that his character was nasty, stating "It's another extension – it's better than playing goody-goody fathers all the time. He's a con man with redeeming features. It'll be interesting to see how it comes up." Donovan noted how he had played a lot of father figures prior to accepting the role and said it was "nice" to do something different. In his book Home and Away Special, Clive Hopwood described Al as Bobby's missing "father" who "crosses words" with Donald Fisher (Norman Coburn) because he knows a "dark and murky secret" about him. Donovan later told Kevin Sadlier of The Sun-Herald that "the best I've been able to do with Al is give him a sense of humour." He added that Al is "not a very nice person", while Sadlier called Al a "ne'er-do-well step-father".

Al responds to an invitation from Bobby to her wedding to Frank Morgan by sending a letter telling her he is not her father. Bobby and Frank visit Al in prison and Bobby confronts him about this revelation. He tells her that Alf Stewart (Ray Meagher) knows who her real parents are. It soon emerges that Morag Bellingham (Cornelia Frances) and Donald Fisher are Bobby's biological parents and Al and late his wife, Doris illegally adopted her. When Al is released, he returns to Summer Bay with his teenage daughter Sophie (Elmaloglou). Bobby is not pleased to see Al and warns everyone in town about him. Donald is unnerved to see Al, who begins blackmailing him over the death of Shane Wilson eight years earlier. Al uses Sophie for schemes to con money out of people and when they fail, he takes his anger out on her physically as he did to Bobby in her youth. Bobby and Shane's brother Matt (Greg Benson) do some detective work and figure out Al is the culprit. When Al holds Sophie, Bobby and Matt hostage overnight, they are found by Tom Fletcher (Roger Oakley) and Detective Hunt (Kim Knuckey). After Al's confession is overheard, he is arrested and returned to prison.

== Others ==
Date(s)	Character	Actor	Circumstances
17 January	Policeman	Bruce Venables	A policeman who apprehends Frank Morgan in a flashback to the year 1978. Venables spoke the first ever piece of dialogue featured in the serial.
17 January	Mr. Jarvis	John Stone	Mr. Jarvis is a man from Youth and Community Services who explains Frank Morgan's (Alex Papps) background to Tom (Roger Oakley) and Pippa Fletcher (Vanessa Downing) in a 1978 flashback before they agree to foster Frank.
17 January	Tom's Boss	John Douglas	Tom Fletcher's (Roger Oakley) boss who informs him of his retrenchment.
17 January	Tarquin Pearce	John O'Brien	Tarquin works for DOCS in the city. He liaises with the Fletcher family following Tom's (Roger Oakley) retrenchment. He is supportive when he learns the family are moving to the country town of Summer Bay. When Tarquin visits the family several weeks later he learns Tom is still unemployed and he and Pippa (Vanessa Downing) are considering fostering Bobby Simpson (Nicolle Dickson) who is seen as a danger to the kids. Bobby storms Tarquin's office and fights the Fletchers' corner. Tarquin then asks Tom and Pippa if they will foster Bobby.
17 January	Bill	Monroe Reimers	Bill is Steven Matheson's (Adam Willits) sensei who teaches him karate at his dojo in the city. After he learns Steven is moving away, he encourages him to stick with Karate and tells he is good enough to practice on his own now.
17 January – 1 February	Mervin Baldivis	Peter Boswell	Baldivis is a council bureaucrat who helps Tom Fletcher (Roger Oakley) secure a job working on the local road gang.
17 January	Miss Purvis	Kay Eklund	Tarquin Pearce's (John O'Brien) a city secretary, who is unable to stop Bobby Simpson (Nicolle Dickson) from barging into his office.
17 January	Doris Peters	Gwen Plumb	Doris is a local gossip who remarks on the Fletcher family who have arrived. After the pilot, she is not seen but is constantly referred to as being around for the next few years and usually informs Celia Stewart (Fiona Spence) of local happenings. Doris was originally intended to be a permanent character in the series, but Plumb decided to join the cast of Richmond Hill after she completed work on the pilot episode of Home and Away.
17 January 1988–19 May 1989	(Sgt.) Bob Barnett	Rob Baxter	Barnett is the local police sergeant. He arrests Bobby Simpson (Nicolle Dickson) on suspicion of burglary and later releases her. Alf Stewart (Ray Meagher) and Ailsa Hogan (Judy Nunn) try to arrange a dinner date between him and Celia (Fiona Spence). Barnett tells Celia that he is only interested in friendship. He later becomes involved in the Barlow family's domestic violence situation and is held hostage by Sam Barlow (Jeff Truman) who steals his gun and kills his wife, Kerry (Liddy Clark) in the process. Barnett later investigates the fire at the general store and the attempted arson on the Blaxland mansion.
19 January – 4 October	(Mr.) Walter Bertram	Owen Weingott	Bertram is the Head teacher of Summer Bay High. He lets Bobby Simpson (Nicolle Dickson) re-enroll in order for to finish Year 12, much to the chagrin of his deputy Head Teacher Donald Fisher (Norman Coburn). Bertram is injured when Bobby and Carly Morris (Sharyn Hodgson) let the handbrake off Lance Smart (Peter Vroom) and Martin Dibble's (Craig Thomson) van causing it to roll downhill and crash into his car, leaving him with a broken leg and head injuries. When the local hall is burned and The Fletcher's dog, Eric and Nico Pappas' (Nicholas Papademetriou) cow, Jessie are poisoned, Pippa Fletcher (Vanessa Downing) learns Bertram is the Summer Bay "Nutter". Bertram did all of these things due to his head trauma following the accident. He is then hospitalised. Several months later, Carly discovers him in an old house and gets a fright. The townspeople treat him badly until John Farnham makes an appearance in Summer Bay and has his picture taken with him. Colleen Smart (Lyn Collingwood) then invites Bertram to move in with her.
19 January	Miss Patterson	Roslyn Gentle	Miss Patterson is Sally Keating's (Kate Ritchie) year three teacher at Summer Bay Primary. She is seen when Sally enrolls at the school.
26 January – 18 July	Samantha Morris	Sharyn Hodgson	Samantha is Carly's twin sister. She arrives in Summer Bay, claiming their father, George (Helmut Bakaitis) has hit her. Carly and Samantha begin switching roles to avoid suspicion. George arrives and agrees to make Carly a star if Samantha comes home in exchange for a $5,000 contract. Lance Smart (Peter Vroom) and Martin Dibble (Craig Thomson) ruin Samantha's shoot in revenge for them taking Carly away. George soon turns the tables by passing the humiliating pictures of Samantha off as Carly while Samantha is left looking glamorous. Carly then decides she never wants to see her father and sister again
26 January – 18 July	George Morris	Helmut Bakaitis	George is the father of Carly Morris and Samantha Morris (Sharyn Hodgson). He sends Carly $8,000 in order for her to pay for the damages to Walter Bertram's car and Clive Fisher's truck. Carly's foster father, Tom asks George about this and learns that Carly has been blackmailing him. George and Samantha later come up with a plan by saying Samantha has gone missing and fakes a kidnapping. After Samantha arrives in the Bay, George follows and the story makes the local papers. He offers Carly a modelling deal, but arranges for a disastrous photo shoot which serves to humiliate Carly. Cary then severs all ties with George.
29 January	Vet	Deborah Kennedy	A vet who calls at Summer Bay House to attend to The Fletcher's pet dog, Eric after he is poisoned. She gives them two choices, the option of costly surgery or putting Eric to sleep. Tom Fletcher (Roger Oakley) chooses the latter leaving, Lynn Davenport (Helena Bozich) devastated.
1 February – 10 June	Nico Pappas	Nicholas Papademetriou	Nico is a Greek autistic boy who befriends Lynn Davenport (Helena Bozich) when she hides out on his farm. Lynn notices Nico is on medication for his condition and encourages him to stop taking the pills. After Lynn is found, Nico is arrested and everyone assumes he kidnapped her. Nico is tricked by Lance Smart (Peter Vroom) and Martin Dibble (Craig Thomson) into using his cow, Jessie to fertilise Donald Fisher's (Norman Coburn) lawn. Jessie dies after being poisoned and Nico tries to strangle Donald as he feels he is responsible for her death. Nico has to be restrained by Lance and Martin. He is committed to a mental hospital and becomes unresponsive. After being released, Nico refuses to return to the farm then moves in with the Fletchers temporarily and causes them mild irritation. The final straw comes when he soaks Frank Morgan (Alex Papps) with the hose. The family then find a way to get Nico back to the farm by purchasing a new cow. Nico attends Frank's wedding to Roo Stewart (Justine Clarke) and recovers Frank's ring from his car after Frank suffers an accident.
2–15 February	Mrs. Pappas	Stella Stefanidis	Mrs. Pappas is Nico's (Nicholas Papademetriou) grandmother who raised him after his parents' deaths. She speaks very limited English and often communicates with Nico by speaking Greek and ringing a bell. When the farm is targeted by racist vandals after Nico is arrested, Floss McPhee (Sheila Kennelly) tries to convince Mrs. Pappas to stay with her overnight. Mrs Pappas is reluctant at first, having not left the farm in twenty years but decides to go. After the vandals are arrested and Nico is released, she returns home.
3 February – 6 April	Chicka	Chris Bennett	The drummer in Frank Morgan's (Alex Papps) band. He is seen at rehearsal and when the band play the Variety Night.
4 February – 15 April	Sam Barlow	Jeff Truman	Sam is Tom Fletcher's (Roger Oakley) boss on the road gang. He is known around Summer Bay for his bad temper and abusive nature. Sam makes a comment about Tom's foster daughter Carly Morris (Sharyn Hodgson) not having any morals in the aftermath of her recent rape. Tom, incensed, fights with Sam and wins. Tom then quits his job and Lance Smart (Peter Vroom) and Martin Dibble (Craig Thomson) walk out in support. However, Tom is rehired and promoted to foreman while Sam is demoted to waste management. Sam begins drinking heavily and takes his frustrations out on his wife Kerry (Liddy Clark) and daughter Sandra (Catherine McColl-Jones). After Sergeant Bob Barnett (Robert Baxter) visits and issues him warnings, Sam manipulates Kerry into locking Sandra in her room. Sandra escapes and Sam begins beating Kerry. Barnett bursts in and there is a commotion. Sam takes Barnett's gun and a hostage situation ensues. Tom tries to disarm Sam after he turns on Sandra but Kerry is shot and killed in the struggle. Sam is then jailed.
17 February	Dr. Lindsay	Susan Rigg	A doctor at the mental hospital Nico Pappas is committed to.
19 February–16 November	Jeff Samuels	Alex Petersons	Jeff is the P.E. teacher at Summer Bay High. He gives Steven Matheson (Adam Willits) a hard time during training, causing Steven to lash out at him, nearly getting expelled in the process. However, he is impressed with Steven's stamina and tells him he could be a champion athlete. Jeff's influence over Steven does very little to impress Tom (Roger Oakley) and Pippa Fletcher (Vanessa Downing), Steven's foster parents. Jeff then motivates Pippa's brother, Danny King (John Clayton) to attend a wheelchair basketball game after he is depressed with life in a wheelchair. Steven quits training and Jeff proceeds to make his life difficult in class by singling him out. Jeff's younger brother, Gary (Darius Perkins) arrives and he gives him an alibi when he is accused of raping Carly Morris (Sharyn Hodgson). Gary saves Brett Macklin (Gerry Sont) from committing suicide and his sister Stacey (Sandie Lillingston) rewards him with a date but he bores her by talking sports all night. Gary dies in a clifftop plunge and Jeff is convinced Carly pushed him. However, the truth is revealed and Jeff apologises for his brother's actions and leaves.
19 February 1988–23 February 1989	Alison Patterson	Kathryn Ridley	Alison is an antagonist in Year twelve who frequently harasses Bobby Simpson (Nicolle Dickson), Carly Morris (Sharyn Hodgson) and Roo Stewart (Justine Clarke). Alison circulates a love note from Donald Fisher (Norman Coburn) to Ailsa Hogan around the school. She then teases Carly about her crush on Andrew Foley (Peter Bensley) and taunts Carly when her attempt at fame fails. Alison works as a secretary for the Macklins and is tricked by Gary Samuels (Darius Perkins) into revealing the combination to the office safe to him and is fired by Stacey (Sandie Lillingston) and punched by Bobby. She uses Lance Smart (Peter Vroom) to get him to buy her an expensive dress for the school dance, by feigning interest in him and agreeing to be his date. Carly arrives wearing the same dress and Alison is upset so she asks Lance to buy her a car instead. He does so, but only it is a toy. Alison then tries to put itching powder in Bobby's dress but it backfires. Matt Wilson (Greg Benson) dates Alison but publicly dumps her after he learns Alison has disclosed the fact that Morag Bellingham (Cornelia Frances) is Bobby's biological mother and sold the story to the local newspaper. Alison then leaves the bay.
23–29 February	Mrs. Lacey	Margaret Cruickshank	Mrs. Lacey is Scott McPhee's (Peter Ford) housekeeper. She interviews Scott's mother, Floss (Sheila Kennelly) who uses a pseudonym "Mrs Neville" to obtain the position of nanny to his son, Ben (Justin Rosniak).
25 February – 10 November	Alyce Davis	Beth Buchanan	A girl in Year 12 who Steven Matheson (Adam Willits) briefly shows interest in.
25 February – 19 April	Sandra Barlow	Catherine McColl-Jones	Sandra is Sam (Jeff Truman) and Kerry's (Liddy Clark) daughter. Steven Matheson (Adam Willits) takes an interest in her and they begin dating, much to Sam's annoyance. Sandra and her mother often find themselves on the receiving end of Sam's violence. She confides in Ailsa Hogan (Judy Nunn), who experienced the same thing in youth. After both Sandra and Kerry are hospitalised, Sandra then prepares to make a stand against her father which culminates in an armed standoff where Sam kills Kerry, leaving her devastated. Sandra visits her house in the aftermath and is spooked by a phone call from "The Nutter" who tells her Sam got what he deserved. Sandra then bids an emotional farewell to Steven and Ailsa when she moves to the city to live with a foster family.
29 February–10 May	Ben McPhee	Justin Rosniak	Ben is Floss (Sheila Kennelly) and Neville McPhee's (Frank Lloyd) estranged grandson. Floss takes a job as his nanny but keeps her identity a secret. Ben's spoiled behaviour annoys Floss and she is quick to discipline him by lightly smacking him. Ben phones his father, Scott (Peter Ford) and tells him but Floss is able to talk her way out of the situation by disguising her voice. Ben agrees to behave and he and Floss begin to get on better. When Floss brings Ben to stay with her and Neville for a while, he becomes suspicious when he discovers old photos of Scott. Floss then confesses that she and Neville are Ben's grandparents. Ben refuses to believe it at first as Scott told him they were dead. He then accepts that they are his grandparents and forms a bond with them. When Scott returns from overseas, he is angry about being lied to takes Ben home against his wishes and forbids Floss and Neville to see him. Ben then lies to the police that Scott is hitting him, but later admits he has been lying. Floss and Neville tell Ben that they never want to see him again to spare his feelings. The McPhees are reunited on Mother's day when Ben and his parents visit Summer Bay.
4 March – 18 April	Father Rawlings	Jeff Kevin	Rawlings is a Catholic priest who encourages Lynn Davenport (Helena Bozich) to return to the church after she has a crisis of faith and he later presides over the funeral of Kerry Barlow (Liddy Clark) following her death at the hands of her husband, Sam (Jeff Truman).
21 March 1988–9 March 1990	Andrew Foley	Peter Bensley	Andrew is a teacher at Summer Bay High, who holds auditions for a school production of The Mikado. Carly Morris (Sharyn Hodgson) develops a crush on him and later confesses her feelings to him. When he hugs her, Donald Fisher (Norman Coburn) walks in and assumes the worst. Andrew leaves the Bay after rumours are spread. Andrew reappears when Carly attends counselling for alcoholism in the city. He resigns and begins a relationship with her. Morag Bellingham (Cornelia Frances) befriends Andrew and asks him to set up a Youth Centre in Summer Bay. He is enraged when his estranged father Andrew Senior (Alan Tobin) backs the centre. Andrew refuses to speak to his father and begins drinking heavily after his death. After splitting with Carly, Andrew then forms a friendship with Stacey Macklin (Sandie Lillingston) and they grow closer and become a couple. They become engaged but they break up after a misunderstanding involving Stacey's ring going missing. Stacy leaves and he gets his job at the school back, but only temporarily before being replaced by Grant Mitchell (Craig McLachlan). Andrew then leaves Summer Bay.
28 March–10 May	Scott McPhee	Peter Ford	Scott is Floss (Sheila Kennelly) and Neville's (Frank Lloyd) estranged son. He arrives in Summer Bay to collect his son, Ben (Justin Rosniak) and refuses to let his parents have contact with him. Scott resents his parents for raising him in a circus caravan and the carnival lifestyle. Floss and Neville make camp outside Scott's house and refuse to leave until he lets them see Ben. Scott threatens them with the police, who arrive but not to deal with them but in response to a Ben making a false complaint of Scott hitting him. After the police leave, Scott orders Floss and Neville to leave and never contact Ben again. Neville confronts Scott on mother's day and chastises him for not seeing Floss or calling. Scott then brings his wife Anna (Kate Turner) and Ben to the Bay to visit and the family enjoy themselves on the beach.
5 April 1988–25 January 1990	Reverend Flowers	Philip Ross	Reverend Flowers is an Anglican minister at St. James' Church. He presides over the abortive wedding of Frank Morgan (Alex Papps) and Roo Stewart (Justine Clarke), the funeral service of Alan Fisher (Simon Kay) and the wedding of Frank to Bobby Simpson (Nicolle Dickson). Flowers makes his last appearance when he assumes Celia has a drinking problem after he sees her with a bottle of holy water in church, unaware she is using it for an exorcism he previously refused to perform on Morag Bellingham's (Cornelia Frances) empty house.
5 April 1988–15 March 1990	Betty Falwell	Barbara Morton	Betty is a local gossip who is usually seen in the company of Celia Stewart (Fiona Spence).
11–13 April	Barry Davenport	Michael Caton	Barry is Lynn Davenport's (Helena Bozich) father.
13 April – 25 July	Dawn	Jenny Cook	Dawn is a caravan park guest who Lance Smart (Peter Vroom) and Martin Dibble (Craig Thomson) attempt to spy on in the shower block but are caught and beaten by her boyfriend Russell (Grant Bennett).
14 April – 5 August	Russell	Grant Bennett	Russell is Dawn's (Jenny Cook) boyfriend who beats up Lance Smart (Peter Vroom) and Martin Dibble (Craig Thomson) for attempting to spy on her. They cause him further annoyance when they break into his and Dawn's house to retrieve Lance's missing lottery ticket once night. Russell is later seen as a bouncer for the Macklin's cocktail party.
18 April 1988–10 May 1989	Miss Molloy	Barbara Wyndon	Miss Molloy works for DOCS. She takes Donald Fisher (Norman Coburn) to task after he blames Tom Fletcher (Roger Oakley) for the death of Kerry Barlow (Liddy Clark). She is next seen when Bobby Simpson (Nicolle Dickson) decides she wants to live with Ailsa Hogan (Judy Nunn) and tells Ailsa marriage will help her case. Molloy reappears when the Fletchers have problems with Carly Morris (Sharyn Hodgson) and she asks them if they will foster Brian "Dodge" Forbes (Kelly Dingwall), which they agree to.
19–20 April	Deidre Furlow	Diana Davidson	Deidre arrives at the Caravan Park after her car breaks down and decides to stay for a while. She takes an interest in Floss McPhee (Sheila Kennelly) and Neville's (Frank Lloyd) travelling circus caravan home. Floss initially agrees to the sale but Neville is reluctant. Their neighbours Lance Smart (Peter Vroom) and Martin Dibble (Craig Thomson) begin trying to discourage Deidre from buying the van by generally being a nuisance and trying to put her off but she remains insistent. Floss then changes her mind and tears the contract and Deirdre drives away.
25 April–6 May	Danny King	John Clayton	Danny is Pippa Fletcher's (Vanessa Downing) brother. Danny is in a wheelchair due to injuries sustained in the Vietnam War. He arrives in Summer Bay for ANZAC day and upsets Celia Stewart (Fiona Spence) with some horrifying tales of his experiences of the war, which bring back memories of her fiancé Les Palmer's (Graham Lancaster) death. Danny reveals his reason for being in the bay is he wants Pippa to help him commit suicide, which she refuses. Danny attempts suicide by jumping off Stewart's point but Pippa calls his bluff. Danny goes missing, and they send out a rescue party, Tom and Pippa search for him and find his wheelchair at the bottom of the cliffs and assume the worst. However, Danny arrives safe and well and tells them he failed to set the handbrake on his wheelchair, and was at Alf Stewart's place all along. Pippa wants to tell Tom about Danny's desire to die but refuses to let her. Pippa then tells him to leave. Pippa and Danny's parents Bert (Kevin Healy) and Coral (Jessica Noad) rush to Danny's bedside after learning of a suicide attempt. Danny later recovers and Jeff Samuels (Alex Petersons) remembers him from his time as a professional cricketer and asks him to give his school class a talk. Danny is reluctant but after attending a wheelchair basketball game, Danny changes his mind and leaves with a new lease on life.
4 May 1988, 13 July 1995–6 October 1997	Bert King	Kevin Healy; Peter Collingwood	Bert is Pippa Fletcher's (Vanessa Downing) father. He arrives with his wife Coral (Jessica Noad) when their son, Danny (John Clayton) tries to commit suicide. Bert returns to the Bay following Coral's death in 1995 to visit Pippa. He manages to inadvertently upset several family members with a few comments and is often forgetful and careless. After an accident with the gas barbecue, Bert is taken to a retirement home and is resistant at first but he complies when he learns his old friend Harry Prendegast (Geoffrey Rees; Ben Gabriel) is living there. Bert makes sporadic returns over the next few years.
4 May 1988–6 October 1989	Coral King	Jessica Noad	Coral is Pippa Fletcher's (Vanessa Downing mother. She arrives with her husband, Bert (Kevin Healy) when their son, Danny (John Clayton) tries to commit suicide. She blames herself for not being able to help him. Coral next appears when Pippa's husband Tom (Roger Oakley) suffers a stroke and helps with the running of the house. Coral begins giving gifts to Steven (Adam Willits) and Sally (Kate Ritchie). It soon emerges that Coral is shoplifting and Steven tries his best to put the stolen items back but is arrested one day while in Yabbie Creek. Carly Morris (Sharyn Hodgson) urges Coral to come clean. Coral mentions she has been shoplifting for the past decade to maintain the same lifestyle she had when Bert was working before he took out a pension. Coral is then tried and given a good behaviour bond then returns home. Coral dies of a stroke in 1995.
10 May	Anna McPhee	Kate Turner	Anna is married to Scott McPhee and mother of their son, Ben (Justin Rosniak). She appears when Scott takes her and Ben to visit his parents Floss (Sheila Kennelly) and Neville McPhee (Frank Lloyd) in Summer Bay for Mother's Day.
12 May – 22 September	Dr. Bruce	Nick Holland	Dr. Bruce is a local doctor who works at Northern Districts hospital. He attends to a pregnant Pippa Fletcher (Vanessa Downing) after Bobby Simpson (Nicolle Dickson) collides with her on her bike. He is next seen when Pippa goes into labour and he unsuccessfully operates on Alan Fisher (Simon Kay), following his collapse after an aneurysm. Bruce is last seen when Brett Macklin snatches his new-born daughter, Martha (Burcin Kapkin).
6 June	Mrs. Macklin	Marilyn Mayo	Mrs. Macklin is married to Gordon (Ron Haddrick) and mother of Stacey (Sandie Lillingston) and Brett (Gerry Sont). She appears when Bobby Simpson (Nicolle Dickson) tries to track Brett down. She reveals to Bobby that Brett has the mumps, which has rendered him sterile.
8 June 1988–29 March 1990	Rhonda	Genevieve McCunn; Anna Plateris	Rhonda is a stripper who arrives for Frank Morgan's (Alex Papps) bucks' party. Rhonda then spends the night with Lance Smart (Peter Vroom) in his caravan. Rhonda decides to move in with Lance into his new mobile home following his lottery win but plans are derailed when Lance's mother Colleen (Lyn Collingwood) moves in after Lance's father Les (Kevin Golsby) leaves her. She later dates Martin Dibble (Craig Thomson) but the date goes awry when another girl, Jenny arrives. Rhonda is last seen on the eve of Martin's departure for the army.
30 June–31 January 1989	Judith Staples	Liza Tyler	Judith is a student in year twelve who is frequently seen in the company of Alison Patterson (Kathryn Ridley) and is often party to her schemes.
12 July	Julie Davenport	Olivia Brown	Julie is Lynn Davenport's (Helena Bozich) mother. She makes a televised appeal for Lynn to return to the family home.
12–20 July	Graham Barton	Marc Caleb	Graham is a journalist who covers Lynn Davenport's (Helena Bozich) story then arranges for some editing to be done on a modelling video shoot to make Carly Morris (Sharyn Hodgson) look bad.
21 July 1988–12 November 1989	Gordon Macklin	Ron Haddrick	Gordon is the father of Brett and Stacey Macklin. He arrives in Summer Bay to begin land developments and offers several residents jobs. Ailsa Hogan (Judy Nunn) distrusts the Macklin family and refuses to sell her store to him. Gordon visits the hospital when Roo Stewart (Justine Clarke) gives birth to Brett's baby and is disappointed when the child is a girl. He rejects Brett's request for assistance to gain custody of Martha (Burcin Kapkin). Gordon tries again to buy the store again, which is now owned by Celia Stewart (Fiona Spence). He later threatens to fire Stacey but she threatens to expose his dodgy business dealings. However, they reconcile after Stacey's fiancé Philip Matheson (John Morris) is killed in a fire. After a shark attacks and kills Rory Heywood (Gregor Jordan), Gordon pays Zac Burgess (Mark Conroy) $2000 to catch the shark but later agrees to double the money if it is kept alive. Gordon is found to be responsible for dumping toxic waste on the beach and in the sea and Zac threatens to expose this, prompting him to leave for good.
26 July 1988, 3–26 July 2000	Les Smart	Kevin Golsby; Rob Steele	Les is married to Colleen Smart (Lyn Collingwood) and the father of Lance Smart (Peter Vroom). Lance wins $500, 000 on the lottery and Les asks him for a loan of $50, 000 and leaves Summer Bay with another woman, Doris, breaking Colleen's heart. Les returns in 2000, broke and homeless and Colleen mistakes him for a prowler when she sees him outside her mobile home and hits him. After learning Les is going to leave again, Colleen has a change of heart and lets him stay and agrees to give him another chance. Les is horrified when Colleen insists he gets a job. Les soon takes a liking to Rhonda Davies (Lynda Stoner), who is staying at the Caravan Park and begins seeing her behind Colleen's back. He then tells Colleen he got a job in Brisbane and flees with Rhonda after taking Colleen's secret savings.
12 August 1988–8 March 1989	Ern Dibble	Peter Carmody	Ern is the father of Martin Dibble (Craig Thomson). He appears when he offers Martin a tip on greyhound racing and later when Martin brings his girlfriend, Leanne Dunn (Kylie Foster) to meet the family for dinner. His chauvinistic behaviour does little to impress Leanne.
23 August – 16 September	Graham Ridge	Tom Richards	Graham is a former priest an old friend of Ailsa Stewart (Judy Nunn). When Ailsa leaves Summer Bay after an argument with her husband Alf Stewart (Ray Meagher), she finds Graham in the city. When Alf spots Ailsa hugging Graham, he thinks the worst. Ailsa later explains that Graham was her old boyfriend before she went to prison, but had committed himself to religion once she got out. Ailsa decides to leave the bay for good Graham is last seen driving Ailsa toward the airport. However, Ailsa returns.
3 October 1988–16 November 1989	"Skid"	Chris Harding	Skid is a friend of Revhead (Gavin Harrison). He makes fun of Walter Bertram (Owen Weingott) and later harasses Roo Stewart (Justine Clarke) for dating David Lee (Anthony Wong). He and Revhead continue to cause trouble for several Summer Bay residents but are foiled in an attempt to extort money out of Viv Newton (Mouche Phillips) and Emma Jackson (Dannii Minogue) for denting Revhead's car.
18 October	Mrs. Patterson	Colleen Fitzpatrick	Mrs. Patterson is the mother of Alison (Kathryn Ridley) and her siblings Mav (Clayton Williams), Skye (Angela Keep) and Kim (Jacqui Townsend). She scolds Alison for lacking direction.
20 October – 16 November	Craig Barnett	Jonathan Niesche	Craig, nicknamed "Piglet", is the son of Bob Barnett (Robert Baxter). Craig finds Jeff Samuels training regimen a little too heavy and is often left tired. Craig injures his leg and Jeff gives him some painkillers and tells him to continue training and compete in the local fun run. Craig collapses before he can finish the race and is found with the painkillers on him. Jeff is then implicated. When Bob leaves town for several weeks, Celia Stewart (Fiona Spence) lets him stay with her. Craig then turns to Steven Matheson (Adam Willits) for help. They stage a plan where Craig is shown to be unruly by inviting two girls over from school. The plan succeeds and Craig is thrown out and gets to stay with The Fletchers instead until Bob returns.
18–29 November	David Lee	Anthony Wong	David meets Roo Stewart (Justine Clarke) while she is visiting her daughter Martha (Burcin Kapkin) in a city hospital. He arrives in Summer Bay after being invited to stay over Christmas by Roo's father Alf Stewart (Ray Meagher). Alf is shocked when he learns David is Chinese as Roo did not mention it. Their relationship is met with racial prejudice by many people and David leaves after telling Roo he is arranged to be married.
23 November	Les Morgan	Mario Kery	Les and Helena are Frank Morgan's (Alex Papps) parents who are seen in his childhood flashbacks. Les is a career criminal and Helena is an alcoholic. They frequently argue and Frank is often left to fend for himself and is fostered by Tom Fletcher (Roger Oakley) and Pippa Fletcher (Vanessa Downing) after being caught by the police.
23 November	Helena Morgan	Lee Sanderson	Les and Helena are Frank Morgan's (Alex Papps) parents who are seen in his childhood flashbacks. Les is a career criminal and Helena is an alcoholic. They frequently argue and Frank is often left to fend for himself and is fostered by Tom Fletcher (Roger Oakley) and Pippa Fletcher (Vanessa Downing) after being caught by the police.
29 November 1988–30 January 1989	Annabelle Hayes	Kristen Lyons	Annabelle is Carly Morris's (Sharyn Hodgson) housemate in the city. Annabelle is a drug addict and influences Carly into drinking and taking drugs. When Carly's foster mother Pippa Fletcher (Vanessa Downing) learns the truth confronts Annabelle and tricks by her saying she has called the police, Annabelle panics and flushes $2000 worth of dope.
