= Lance Smart =

- Home and Away character
- Portrayed by: Peter Vroom
- Duration: 1988–90, 2000–06
- First appearance: 17 January 1988
- Last appearance: 1 December 2006
- Introduced by: Alan Bateman (1988); John Holmes (2000); Julie McGuaran (2001–06)
In-universe information
- Occupation: Oyster farm worker Road Gang worker (1988, 1989); Soldier (1990–2000); Army sergeant
- Father: Les Smart
- Mother: Colleen Smart
- Half-sisters: Maureen Evans
- Wife: Debbie Langford (2000–)
- Daughters: Maggie Smart
- Grandfathers: Gordon Stewart
- Grandmothers: Mavis Hickey
- Uncles: Roy Smart; Alf Stewart
- Aunts: Morag Bellingham; Celia Stewart; Barbara Stewart; Debra Stewart; Patricia Turner
- First cousins: Narelle Smart; Rebecca Nash; Alan Fisher; Bobby Marshall; Owen Dalby; Quinn Jackson; Roo Stewart; Duncan Stewart
- Other relatives: Martha MacKenzie; Ric Dalby

Lance Smart is a fictional character from the Australian Channel Seven soap opera Home and Away, played by Peter Vroom. Vroom appeared from the pilot episode as one of the serial's original characters. Lance is Vroom's first television role and he auditioned to play him after he completed an acting course. In his audition, Vroom had to improvise a scene and make Lance appear like a "dumb character". He vas not very vocal and laughed during the improvisation, which casting directors liked. Lance is characterised a "slow witted" larrikin and those around him see him as a "joke". Lance forms an on-screen partnership with Martin Dibble (Craig Thomson) and their characters were subsequently used as the serial's comedy characters. Both Vroom and Thomson said that their characters did not provide a realistic representation of young people as the production team often censored their dialogue. Lance also has an over-protective mother Colleen Smart (Lyn Collingwood) with whom he had to contend with. His main romantic relationship is with Marilyn Chambers (Emily Symons) and the pair became engaged. Their romance was short-lived as Lance decided against marrying her. Lance and Martin were named as the "thickest characters ever to grace soapland" in the Daily Record.

Vroom was axed from the series alongside Thomson after producer Andrew Howie wanted to focus on new characters. Vroom finished filming in March 1990 and departed during the episode aired on 11 April. Vroom later returned to the soap in 2000 on a guest contract. He subsequently made short returns during the five years that followed and his final appearance aired on 1 December 2006.

== Casting ==
Peter Vroom secured the role of Lance after he completed a course at the Australian Theatre for Young People, making it his first television role. Vroom learned about the upcoming auditions for the newly created Home and Away whilst he was still studying there. Vroom attended the auditions and was not given a script to work off and had to improvise a scene. Vroom recalled that "I had to play a dumb character, pretending to chat up a beautiful chick. I think what won them over was the fact that I didn't really say anything, I just kind of giggled." He was then cast as Lance.

== Development ==
=== Characterisation and relationships ===
Lance is characterised as having little intelligence and is "slow witted". Vroom told Inside Soap that "Lance was a caricature, he was never very successful at anything, and people generally thought he was a joke. That was his role, to provide a few laughs." Lance forms an on-screen duo as the "partner in crime" of Martin Dibble (Craig Thomson). Thomson said that the characters are Home and Away's answer to Laurel and Hardy. Like Martin, Lance is unpopular with females and even "their closest friends" see them as not being "heart-throbs". They are portrayed as a pair of "yobbos and larrikins" who work at a local oyster farm. Lance and Martin share common enemies, their biggest feud is with Donald Fisher (Norman Coburn) who throws them out of cadet corps. They also have a general dislike for the local "surfie" males, who later become their "great nemesis" due to them receiving all the attention from the local females. Lance holds an opinion that Martin is "irresistible" to the opposite sex and is impressed by his persona.

"I enjoy it when we have a really serious scene to play. Usually Lance and Martin are drinking yobs, but they're not allowed to swear which is not so realistic."

— Vroom on the realism of Lance. (1990)

Thomson has stated that the duo "stand out a lot" because of their over-the-top nature. While Vroom felt they rarely got "serious" scenes because they were mostly involved in comedic storylines. Vroom criticised the writing Martin and Lance received because he did not think it represented how young people behave. Home and Away's critics also scrutinised the writing "for a lack of realism". Thomson said the serial's early evening time slot often caused dialogue to be censored. The actor stated that "Lance and Martin are definitely drinkers and if it wasn't for the timeslot they would be into marijuana too." Though he defended the characters because they had to be responsible and cater for young viewers. Vroom told a writer from Look-in that Lance always appeared "abnormally tall" on-screen because no other cast members were over six foot in height like himself. He also said that he was the "worst out of the whole cast" for laughing during filming. Fergus Sheil from Enniscorthy Guardian asked Vroom if he ever feared being typecast as a "dingbat" like Lance is. Vroom replied "not at all. I love him. I have to, because he is part of me."

Lance is the "beloved" son of Colleen Smart (Lyn Collingwood), she "dotes on" Lance and often intimidates him into doing things she wants. Lance also had a relationship with Marilyn Chambers (Emily Symons) which does not work out. Colleen is so protective of Lance that twenty years later she still does not "like or trust" Marilyn for breaking "her Lancey's' heart". Lance and Marilyn get engaged and even go shopping for a wedding dress. Their engagement follows a series of arguments but Lance plans a surprise meal and proposes. Symons explained to David Brown from TV Week "that's what she's always wanted, then she goes full swing. She buys a wedding dress and starts to refurbish Lance's home!" Symons later recalled "I've got a old photo of me [Marilyn] in a wedding dress, but he dumped Marilyn before they got to the altar, so the wedding never happened."

=== Departure and returns ===
The actor's contract was due to expire in February 1990 but was informed in 1989 that he would lose his job. Producer Andrew Howie decided not to renew either Thomson or Vrooms's contracts as he wanted to concentrate on developing new characters. Howie told Brown (TV Week) that "We feel we've exhausted their characters and their stories. With the new members of the cast, we have greater potential with other characters for 1990. It's sad to lose original cast members, but it's a developing program. We think viewers will like the direction Home and Away will take." Vroom filmed his final scenes in March 1990. After leaving Summer Bay, Lance becomes an army sergeant and resides in Townsville. Lance and Martin were characters featured in the 1991 stage musical, Home and Away: The Musical. Thomson reprised his role as Martin, whereas actor Andrew Lawden took on the role of Lance.

Vroom returned to filming in 2000, for a storyline which sees Lance back in Summer Bay to attend the wedding of Sally Fletcher (Kate Ritchie) and Kieran Fletcher (Spencer McLaren). Vroom said that Lance had grown up and "matured" in his absence and "won the respect of his peers" in his army career. Though Lance's love life does not fare as well and he does not talk about it much upon his return. Vroom said "he admits he's been seeing a girl who upset him quite a bit, but that's all". Vroom found it challenging to reprise the role because Lance had changed. He felt that he did not have to portray him like he used to, adding it was like "editing an old character". Home and Away decided to sign Vroom up to make additional appearances later that year. Vroom said he would have liked to return on a more permanent basis. In an interview published on the show's official website, Vroom described his return as a "great opportunity and added he was "excited" to reprise the role and reconnect with old friends. Lance had also been working as a soldier and eventually progressed to become an army sergeant. He was stationed in Townsville and the city's climate is hot, to reflect this the show's production required Vroom to wear make-up to make Lance appear tanned. Vroom described the additional make-up as "the worst part" of his return, but acknowledged that "I am a little older as well", and therefore needed extra make-up. In his return story, Lance's arrival shocks Colleen but he claims to be in town to visit her. Lance is vague about his army career and avoids detailing how his job is faring. Writers made it clear that Lance is hiding a secret, but despite wanting to tell Colleen he does not want to disappoint her.

He returned in 2002 as part of the serial's fourteenth anniversary celebrations. During his time off-screen Lance became a father to baby Maggie. He returned once again in 2005 as part of the 4000th episode of Home and Away. In the storyline Lance arrives to celebrate Alf Stewart's (Ray Meagher) birthday.

== Storylines ==
Lance and Martin save Carly Morris (Sharyn Hodgson) from drowning, though she then causes them to crash their van. Donald's brother, Clive fires them from the local oyster farm and they take revenge by planting a jellyfish in Donald's car. They then bully Nico Pappas (Nicholas Papademetriou), who is handicapped, into spraying manure over Donald's lawn. He forces Lance to clean it up by hand and Alf bans them from buying alcohol. Martin convinces Lance to help brew their own. When Tom Fletcher (Roger Oakley) is fired from his job, Lance and Martin arrange a strike. Lance then gets Donald's cat drunk on the home brew and hides it until it sobers up. Lance then drills a hole in the shower block at the caravan park so he can spy on Dawn (Jenny Cook), a resident. Her boyfriend, Russell (Grant Bennett) discovers the hole and another woman hits Lance with a broom. Lance and Martin start a rumour that Carly is sleeping with the science teacher Andrew Foley (Peter Bensley), which results in his career being ruined and he leaves Summer Bay.

Carly buys Lance a lottery ticket which wins him half a million dollars. Lance then purchases a mobile home in the caravan park. His father, Les (Kevin Golsby) takes $50,000 from Lance and runs off with another woman, leaving Colleen heart-broken. She decides to move in with Lance, who does not want her to stay with him. Lance buys a new car with some of his money. Martin then acts irresponsibly which results in the vehicle being stolen, Lance nearly tells him he wants nothing to do with him. When Colleen decides she wants to date Donald, Lance spikes his drink. However, Celia Stewart (Fiona Spence) drinks it. He continues to try to keep the two apart. Gary Samuels (Darius Perkins) convinces Lance to invest money in a nightclub. Lance does not realise that Gary is conning him and the nightclub does not exist. Alison Patterson (Kathryn Ridley) then pretends she is attracted to Lance so he will buy her a new dress and hire a limousine for her. She then attempts to persuade him to buy a new car for her and he does so, only it is a toy. Lance then decides to give his money away.

When Martin gets a girlfriend, Lance feels alone and runs away. No one notices Lance has even gone and he later returns claiming to have a girlfriend named Marilyn. He then feels sorry for Dodge (Kelly Dingwall) who is in trouble with the police and lets him hide in his house. He fears he will be charged for aiding Dodge and no one believes that Marilyn exists. When Marilyn arrives in Summer Bay everyone cannot believe that she would want to be with Lance. He takes her on a date via a boat, but during an accident they become lost at sea. After the event Marilyn decides to move to the town. Lance thinks they are getting too serious, so she decides to go on a date with Martin. They split up and Lance throws Martin out of his home. He pays Bobby Simpson (Nicolle Dickson) to give Marilyn a job at the Diner to win her back. Bobby soon fires Marilyn so Morag Bellingham (Cornelia Frances) decides to give her a job. However Marilyn decides to dump Lance after being influenced by Morag. After they reunite, he tries to force her out of her job, but Morag remains one step ahead. After Marilyn gets on well with Colleen, Lance dumps her.

Lance then joins a band but the manager, Nina Olivera (Raquel Suarstzman), attempts to use his talent to make more money than Lance. Morag decides to rewrite the contract so it is fair for Lance. Marilyn decides to distance herself from Lance for band image purposes. Lance feel as though Nina is manipulating him and gets cold feet at the fame he faces. He puts on a ski mask to escape, but the incident leaves him as a suspect in a masked man who had followed schoolgirl Sally. Lance then sabotages TV appearances and songs leading to the band to be dropped, leaving Martin and Marilyn furious with him. Lance then wins some money and starts a hotdog business with the help of Celia. When they fail to bring in business she threatens to sack them. When they do not follow correct procedures, they become convinced that Celia will have food poisoning. Celia collapses and "dies", leaving the pair horrified. She then gets back up and tells them she was teaching them a lesson. He then becomes unsure whether or not to marry Marilyn, their relationship has more good and bad moments. Martin later leaves town to join the army. Lance later tells Sally that he does not want to marry Marilyn, he decides he too wants to join the army and departs leaving Marilyn. When Colleen returns, she reveals Lance is now a sergeant living in Townsville, Queensland.

A decade later, Lance returns for Sally's surprise 21st birthday party. During his visit, Lance helps rescue some refugees and reveals to Colleen he has since been discharged from the army and is now married to Debbie (Kelly Butler), who Colleen takes a dislike to. When Colleen suffers a turn during an argument with Debbie, Debbie accuses her of faking but Lance sees she is genuine. After Colleen recovers, Lance and Debbie return home. Lance is next seen when he arrives on the eve of Sally's wedding to Kieran Fletcher and reconnects with Martin who left the army before he did and they celebrate Kieran's stag night, getting drunk. After Keiran's infidelity is exposed, Lance is there to comfort Sally. The following year, Lance returns with his daughter, Maggie in the midst of a split with Debbie. Debbie follows Lance to the Bay and they reconcile, leaving once more.

Lance and a number of previous Summer Bay residents return for the town's 150th celebrations. The event is marred by a huge storm and Lance, Martin several others form a search party to find a group of Summer Bay residents who have been shipwrecked. Lance and Debbie return a few months later believing Colleen is a millionaire after, following the release a book that she has allegedly written. The truth is revealed that Colleen did not write the book and they leave again. Lance continues to make sporadic appearances over the next few years including, Sally's wedding to Flynn Saunders (Joel McIlroy), The christening of Sally's daughter (at which Lance is her godfather), Pippa and Alf's 60th birthday party. Lance makes a brief return at Christmas 2006 to star as one of the three wise men in one of Colleen's Nativity play. A few years later, Colleen reveals Lance and Debbie are moving to Las Vegas and is invited to join them and she accepts.

== Reception ==
Ahead of the pilot's airing, Lucy Clark of The Sydney Morning Herald described Lance and Martin as "two surfie blokes who are thick as two short planks". A columnist of the Daily Record said that Lance and Martin were the "thickest characters ever to grace soapland". Jason Herbison from Inside Soap said that Lance was a "loveable joker". Clive Hopwood wrote in his book Home and Away Special that Lance lacked enough intelligence that he had "difficulty knowing which way round to sit on a bicycle." He also said that Lance and Martin only provided comic relief and always come up with "madcap" and "totally disastrous" schemes. Sarah Thomas of The Sun-Herald branded Lance a "loveable halfwit". Jason Herbison from All About Soap wrote that it is "hard to forget" the "dopey and loveable Lance from the early days."

A writer from TV Life opined "Lance and Martin are our favourite resident dags who just can't seem to figure out why the local surfies get all the chicks and they don't!" They added despite his name, he was the "less than smart Lance". In November 2021, three critics for The West Australian placed Lance at number 23 in their feature on the "Top 50 heroes we love and villains we hate" from Home and Away. Of the character, they stated: "You can't have Lance without his sidekick Martin Dribble — the Laurel and Hardy of Summer Bay. The two, both regular characters when Home and Away first started in the 80s, acted as the show's comic relief double-act. Lance was the son of Colleen (Lyn Collingwood), and went on to make regular guest appearances on the show through the noughties." Lawrie Masterton from TV Week branded Lance and Martin as "a couple of fairly harmless beach oafs".

For his portrayal of Lance, a reporter from Stornoway Gazette and West Coast Advertiser branded Vroom a "Home and Away heart-throb". Jim Hayes from New Ross Standard disagreed and labelled Lance as "possibly the most unlikely pin-up in TV history". He also criticised Lance's musical aspirations, adding that show "watchers will know that his singing talents have a little to be desired." Alison Bain from Glenrothes Gazette summed him up as "luckless Lance". Enniscorthy Guardian's Sheil branded him as "Lance the loveable yobbo" and a "dingbat". He downplayed the character's mentality, adding "Lance, for the benefit of those who have never seen 'Home and Away', has several kangaroos loose in the top paddock." Sheil added that Vroom was "affable" in his public appearances and made Lance into a "super anti-hero" for his fans.
