= John Morris (Australian actor) =

Australian actor

- Born: 23 March 1963 (age 63); Shoalwater, Western Australia, Australia
- Education: Western Australian Academy of Performing Arts
- Occupations: Actor, film producer
- Years active: 1988–present

John Morris (born 23 March 1963) is an Australian actor and film producer. He is best known for playing doctor Philip Matheson in the television soap opera Home and Away and Andrew MacKenzie, the first gay character in Neighbours.

== Career ==
Morris was a paratrooper in the Australian Army before starting his acting career .

Morris joined the cast of soap opera Home and Away in June 1988 as Doctor Philip Matheson, the uncle of Steven Matheson (Adam Willits). Morris was among 150 actors to audition for the role, and he was proud of himself for securing a major role as he had very little acting experience. Philip was intended to boost the show's "hunk value" for viewers between twenty and forty. Morris left after five months with the reason being given as the character not working out as well as planned. Philip was killed off and Morris said he was the "first long-established character" to be killed off. Morris was unaware of how popular he was until he received thousands of letters and messages from fans, and said that he would have asked for the door to be left open for a future return if he had known.

In 1994, Morris joined the supporting cast of Neighbours for 12-weeks as Andrew MacKenzie, the show's first gay character.

Morris made a last-minute appearance as Oliver Mellors in the stage adaptation of Lady Chatterley's Lover.

In 2001 Morris played Donald J. Watt in The Singing Forest, a Julia Britton play based on Watt's memoir Stoker about the Auschwitz concentration camp. He had recently been working as a rigger due to his acting work drying up.

== Personal life ==
Morris is the brother of Australian federal MP Madeleine King.

== Filmography ==
Year	Title	Role	Notes
1988–1989	Home and Away	Philip Matheson	Series regular
1993	Bay City	Bernie	
1994	Neighbours	Andrew MacKenzie	Recurring
1995	Janus	Senior Constable Baxter	
1998	Ted & Ralph	Narli	TV movie
1999	Water Rats	Mitch	
2008	Verite	Kyass	
2009	The Dream Children	Manager	Feature Film
2011	Surviving Georgia		
2019	The Dustwalker	Frank Cole	
2020	The Heights	Police Officer	

== Producer ==
Year	Title	Notes
2014	King of the Mountain	
2015	The Dream Children	Co-producer
2025	Out for Vengeance	Associate producer
TBA	Shield Predator	Pre-production; Associate producer
