= Rona McLeod =

Australian actress

Rona McLeod is an Australian actress, noted for her television appearances.

She appeared as pregnant inmate Jeannie Stanton in Prisoner, had a recurring role in Neighbours during 1990 and 1991 as Felicity Brent, completely unrecognisable from her appearance in Prisoner, and later played Barbara Fisher in Home and Away.

== Filmography ==
=== Film ===
Year	Title	Role	Type
1982	The Clinic	Dr. Carol Young	Feature film
1985	The Still Point	Art Teacher	Feature film
1987	Bachelor Girl	Script workshop	Feature film
1996	Turning April	Evelyn	Feature film

=== Television ===
Year	Title	Role	Type
1969	Skippy	Guest role: Young woman	TV series, 1 episode
1969-1975	Division 4	Guest roles: Barbie Stewart/Linda Rogers/Kath Abbott	TV series, 3 episodes
1970-1975	Homicide	Guest roles: Evie/Paulette Johnson/Penelope Grant/Janet Robinson/Katherine Stacey	TV series, 5 episodes
1973; 1976	Matlock Police	Guest role: Paulette Green	TV series, 1 episode
1974	Out of Love	Guest role:	ABC TV miniseries, 1 episode
1976	Matlock Police	Guest role: Kris Drummond	TV series, 1 episode
1982-1983	Prisoner	Recurring role: Jeannie Stanton	TV series, 5 episodes
1983	Carson's Law	Guest role: Susan	TV series, 1 episode
1983	A Descant for Gossips	Lillian	ABC TV film
1985	One Summer Again	Regular role: Eileen Armitage	ABC TV miniseries, 3 episodes
1985	A Thousand Skies	Marge Mackay	TV miniseries, 1 episode
1985	Special Squad	Guest role: Constable Shelly	TV series, 1 episode
1985; 1986	The Fast Lane	Guest role: Claire	ABC TV series, 1 episode
1986	The Fast Lane	Guest role: Marion	ABC TV series, 1 episode
1986	Neighbours	Guest roles: Barbara Young	TV series, 2 episodes
1988	Rafferty's Rules	Guest role	TV series, 1 episode
1990-1991	Neighbours	Recurring role: Felicity Brent	TV series, 13 episodes
1992	A Country Practice	Guest role: Karen Dyson	TV series, 2 episodes
1996	Home and Away	Guest role: Barbara Stewart	TV series, 2 episodes
1996-1999	Heartbreak High	Guest roles: Sergeant Baker/Detective Del/Amanda	TV series, 4 episodes
