= Sandie Lillingston =

Australian actress

Sandra Lillingston is an Australian actress active between 1984 and 1997.

== Career ==
Lillingston appeared as a presenter in a short 1983 documentary One Last Chance on the probation system in South Australia. Her first acting role was as the ongoing character Christine Yates in the ABC TV series Sweet and Sour in 1984. She went on to have roles in a few films, including a minor role in Mad Max Beyond Thunderdome (1985), but was most prolific in her television roles. These included Home and Away (1988–1989, as Stacey Macklin), A Country Practice (1984 as Sandy Thatcher, 1991 as Megan Thomas), ABC's Bananas in Pyjamas (1992 performer for Amy) and Seven Network's Newlyweds (1992–1994, as Marnie Phelps).
