= Tom Fletcher (Home and Away) =

- Home and Away character
- Portrayed by: Roger Oakley
- Duration: 1988–1990, 2008
- First appearance: 17 January 1988
- Last appearance: 18 February 2008
- Introduced by: Alan Bateman (1988); Julie McGauran (2008)
In-universe information
- Occupation: Hotel/resort management Caravan Park owner Navvy for roads work Foster parent
- Wife: Pippa Fletcher (until 1990)
- Sons: Christopher Fletcher
- Adoptive daughters: Sally Fletcher
- Granddaughters: Pippa Saunders

Thomas Edward Fletcher is a fictional character from the Australian soap opera Home and Away, played by actor Roger Oakley. He made his first screen appearance in the pilot episode broadcast on 17 January 1988. The character departed on 30 April 1990, but reappeared briefly in 2008 as a ghost in Sally Fletcher's near-death experience following her second stabbing.

== Development ==
The character of Tom was conceived by the creator and then executive producer of Home and Away Alan Bateman. New Zealand actor Roger Oakley was cast in the role and Bateman commented "He is so good on the screen, when people see him they will be asking where he has been all their lives." Oakley had appeared in various dramas, including The Sullivans, and a few films, but appearing in Home and Away was the longest he had worked "in one stretch". He considered it to be his breakout role, saying "It shows that it can happen to anyone. I feel also that, in a sense, it's my turn. I've served my time." He felt that he could play a wide range of roles, but thought that he would always be a character actor and "the wrong type" for a major television role.

The character's fictional backstory states that Tom and his wife of ten years Pippa Fletcher (Vanessa Downing) could not have children of their own and became foster parents. Tom was 40 years old when he is sacked from his "cosy city job and was thrown into confusion." At the beginning of the serial, Tom and Pippa move to the fictional town of Summer Bay with their five foster children. Playing a foster parent changed Oakley's mind about fostering a child in real life instead of having biological children. He stated "To me, fostering a child would be just as acceptable as having a child of my own, but obviously it would have to be just as acceptable to the other half."

Tom was billed as being "a dreamer who – like many of his kids – comes from a broken home." Oakley described Tom as "a good character. He's got a bit of a short fuse but he's really a nice guy. He's a bit of a softy." Oakley's ordinary upbringing sharply contrasted with his character's "traumatic beginnings". Keith Richmond of the Daily Mirror branded Tom "idealistic", while a reporter for the Nottingham Evening Post said he is "a man who just can't say no – at least when it comes to problem children."

Oakley's departure from Home and Away was announced in April 1989. David Brown of TV Week reported that Oakley had decided not to renew his contract and would film his final scenes in June. Brown said Oakley had quit the serial for personal reasons and would return to live in Melbourne, after spending 18 months filming in Sydney. He was the third major cast member to leave the show that year. A spokesperson for the Seven Network initially said the character of Tom would be recast, however, producers later decided to kill-off the character.

Tom's death was teased in the 21 April 1990 issue of TV Week, with Brown reporting that an original cast member would be "pensioned off for good." Brown confirmed that a car carrying some of the show's most popular characters would crash, and someone would end up dead. Seven Network tried to keep the identity of the character a secret in the run up to the episode airing in order to build up the "shock element". Brown confirmed that the accident would "rock Summer Bay", while the Fletcher household would be impacted the most. In the run up to the accident, Pippa and Tom settle into "a new 'idyllic and stable' relationship." They decide to have a romantic dinner out and while Pippa gets ready, Tom leaves to coach the touch football team. On the way home, with Steven Matheson (Adam Willits), Bobby Simpson (Nicolle Dickson), and Sophie Simpson (Rebekah Elmaloglou), Tom suddenly slumps over the wheel and the vehicle crashes into an embankment. Tom's departure aired on 30 April 1990.

Oakley reprised the role in February 2008. He confirmed that Tom's return was connected to Sally Fletcher (Kate Ritchie), and that Tom would provide her with help and guidance in a time of real need. He commented: "I literally can't explain how he comes to be there. He's just there." Ritchie said that there are times when people need guidance from their parents and that is the point of Tom coming back into Sally's life. She also said that Tom forces Sally to make a very difficult choice. Oakley added: "He's in a position to say to her, 'Well, if this happens then this is what will happen to you.' Everything stops and she suddenly gets these options."

== Storylines ==
Tom originally lived in the city with his wife, Pippa (Downing). As Pippa had rheumatic fever as a child her heart had been weakened, and had been warned that if she fell pregnant there was a good chance the strain would kill her. Tom had a vasectomy to stop her from falling pregnant, but the two were desperate to become parents and decided to start fostering. They receive their first charge in 1978 in the form of an eight-year-old tearaway named Frank Morgan (Alex Papps), whose parents Les (Mario Kery) and Helena (Lee Sanderson) are a criminal and an alcoholic, respectively. Mr. Jarvis (John Stone) of the Department of Child Services warns Frank is difficult but the Fletchers are able to provide a stable home for him. Ten years later, Frank is still living with the Fletchers and they have since taken on four more children; Carly Morris (Sharyn Hodgson); Steven Matheson (Willits); Lynn Davenport (Helena Bozich); and Sally Keating (Kate Ritchie). Following Tom's 40th birthday, his boss informs him he has been retrenched. Jarvis worries about the children's welfare but the Fletchers are determined not to lose them so they sell the house, pack up and move to the coastal town of Summer Bay.

Shortly after the Fletchers arrive, Tom and Pippa purchase Summer Bay House and the Caravan Park from Alf Stewart (Ray Meagher), who had lived there with his late wife, Martha (Alison Mulvaney), and their daughter, Roo (Justine Clarke). They quickly make friends in the community including park tenants Floss (Sheila Kennelly) and Neville McPhee (Frank Lloyd) and local shopkeeper Ailsa Hogan (Judy Nunn). Tom makes an enemy of neighbour Donald Fisher (Norman Coburn) after he and Pippa foster local tearaway Bobby Simpson (Dickson). Fisher sets about making life difficult for Tom, who struggles find to work. Tom has a small stroke of luck when Mervin Baldivis (Peter Boswell) is able to put a good work in for him working on the road gang for Sam Barlow (Jeff Truman). Tom and Barlow butt heads when Barlow makes an off-hand remark about Carly's recent rape trauma leading to a fight at work and Tom quits after. However, Tom is promoted to foreman and Barlow is demoted to waste detail.

After Carly's embarrassment over Tom's job, he feels hurt. However the Macklin family open the Sands Resort and Tom takes a job there. Further good news arrives when Pippa learns she is pregnant despite Tom's vasectomy. The couple worry Pippa may die during childbirth but decide to take risk. Pippa is healthy and they celebrate the birth of their newborn son, Christopher (Ashleigh Bell-Weir). Work soon begins to take its toll on Tom and he collapses following a stroke and is hospitalised for a number of weeks. Following his recovery, Tom and Pippa's marriage faces a testing time in the next year when Zac Burgess (Mark Conroy) a shark hunter makes a play for Pippa and rumours of an affair are spread around. However, Zac is driven out of town after his behaviour is exposed and Tom and Pippa reconcile. While driving back from a football game with Bobby, Steven and Sophie Simpson (Elmaloglou), Tom suffers a second stroke and crashes the car. Paramedics try to revive him but Tom dies, leaving the family devastated.

18 years later, Tom reappears as a vision to Sally when she suffers a near-death experience after a second stabbing at the hands of Johnny Cooper (Callan Mulvey). He shows Sally a vision of the Bay if she dies and an alternate reality where her long-lost twin brother Miles Copeland (Josh Quong Tart) is murdered by Johnny instead. Tom also shows Sally a glimpse into future which reveals Cassie Turner (Sharni Vinson) has contracted HIV and tells if she does return someone else will die. This is prophetic as Sally's friend Dan Baker (Tim Campbell) dies shortly after. When Sally recovers, she tells Pippa about the vision and she is sceptical, but she still somewhat believes her. Alf also believes her, as he had been through a similar experience when he saw visions of Ailsa after her death during a brain tumour he was suffering from.

== Reception ==
Robin Oliver of The Sydney Morning Herald thought Oakley and Downing played Tom and Pippa with "honest-to-goodness down-home charm". Oliver's colleague Morris Gleitzman observed that Tom and Pippa were "the sort of parents we'd all like to be" and thought the family were warm and cheerful. He called Tom "a remarkable bloke" for facing his 40th birthday, retrenchment and relocation to Summer Bay with confidence and only minor issues. Lawrie Masterson of TV Week branded Tom "a dadasaurus, and then some", and explained that the term was from a t-shirt he purchased that depicted a dinosaur father figure, with the word meaning "a warm, loving, parental creature with the patience of a saint." He also said Tom was a "genuine good guy", who was played "warmly and convincingly" by Oakley.

Jenny Palmer of Birmingham Weekly Post reckoned Oakley must have upset his employers ahead of his exit, as his character first suffers a stroke, becomes stuck on a raft in shark-infested waters, before ultimately dying of another stoke while driving his family home. Ruth Deller of television website Lowculture said "One of the nicest dad characters in soap, ever, has to be Tom Fletcher from Home and Away". The Soap Show called Tom the "first patriarch of Home and Away." In 2001, Kylie Keogh of The Daily Telegraph stated that "long-term fans all remember when Tom died in a car crash after having a heart attack at the wheel."

In November 2021, three critics for The West Australian placed Tom at number 30 in their feature on the "Top 50 heroes we love and villains we hate" from Home and Away. Of the character, they stated: "He was only on the show for a few years, but Tom remains a firm favourite with die-hard fans. He arrived in Summer Bay to run the caravan park with his motley crew of foster kids and loveable wife, Pippa. He died in a car accident — his foster kids Bobby, Sophie and Steven were in the car too — and we, as a nation, were collectively traumatised by his untimely death."
