= Alan Bateman =

Australian television producer and director

- Born: William Alan Bateman; 2 January 1936; Perth, Western Australia
- Died: 18 August 2012 (aged 76)
- Education: Perth Modern School
- Occupations: Film producer; television screenwriter; television producer; television director; Seven Network head of drama; general network manager
- Spouse(s): Clara Bateman (m. 1970–2012) Judy Lee (m. 1963)
- Children: 5

William Alan Bateman (19 June 1936 – 18 August 2012) was an Australian film producer, television screenwriter, and director best known as the creator and original executive producer of the soap opera Home and Away. He was the head of drama and director manager of the Seven Network and General Manager of Network Ten.

== Early life ==
He was the son of William Glyde Bateman.

== Death ==
Bateman died on 18 August 2012 from cancer.

== Filmography ==
- Ring of Scorpio (1991)
- Family and Friends (1990)
- The Flying Doctors (1989–1990)
- The Rainbow Warrior Conspiracy (1989)
- The Power, the Passion (1989)
- Great Performances (1988)
- The Rocks (1988)
- Home and Away (1988-Present)
- The Fremantle Conspiracy (1988)
- Nancy Wake (1987)
- Rolf's Walkabout (1970)
