= Nicholas Papademetriou =

21t century Australian actor

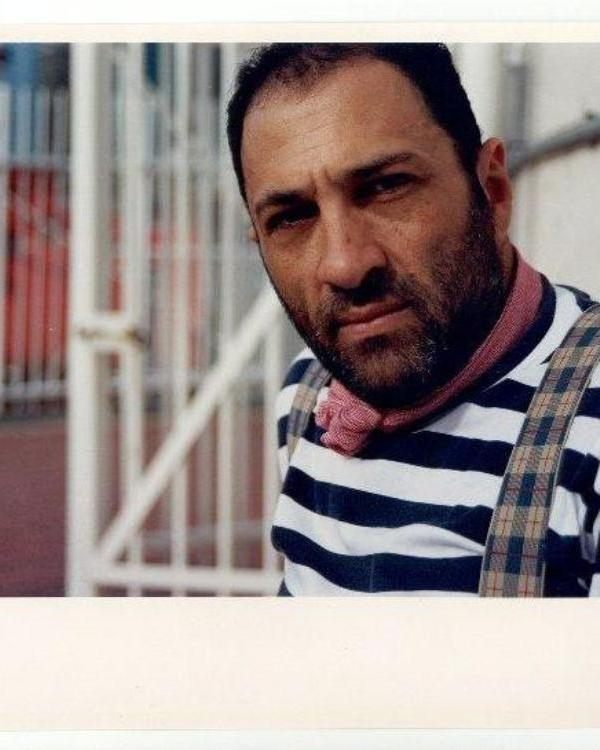
- Born: Sydney, Australia
- Occupations: Actor and director

Nicholas Papademetriou is an Australian actor of Greek Cypriot descent with many television, film and theatre credits. He is a graduate of Western Australian Academy of Performing Arts. He has had an extensive career in film and television since he graduated in 1984, but is best known as a stage actor, having appeared in productions in Australia, London, New York and Edinburgh.

== Career ==
Papademetriou began his acting career in the television soap opera Sons and Daughters as Nikos Dimitriou. This was followed by many television roles in such series as Water Rats, G.P. and All Saints. He had a recurring role in Home and Away in 1988 as Nico Pappas. He returned to the show in another role as Con Poulos in 2001–2002. He had a regular role in both seasons of the ABC series Grass Roots as Victor Trujillo He was also the Australian lead in the Australian Broadcasting Corporation series Stringer. He has had guest roles in most Australian series including Water Rats, Tough Nuts: Australia's Hardest Criminals, The Surgeon and Tricky Business. In 2009, he appeared in several episodes of the children's television series My Place. In the series Gangs of Oz he played Graham 'Abo' Henry. Other miniseries include Cyclone Tracy, Jessica (TV miniseries), A Difficult Woman and Stark (TV miniseries) by Ben Elton.

He is primarily known as a theatre actor and has worked for most of the major theatre companies in Australia including Melbourne Theatre Company, Sydney Theatre Company and Company B Belvoir. In 1989 he worked for Mike Leigh in Greek Tragedy which played in London and Edinburgh. His one-man show 'SNAG' has played around Australia, in New York and Edinburgh. He was also in the Australian national tour of 12 Angry Men. Papademetriou has also directed a number of successful productions including And Miss Reardon Drinks A Little, Lady Windermere's Fan, Anna in the Tropics. In 2010 he created the role of Nikos Nomikos in the world premiere of The Swimming Club by Hannie Rayson for Melbourne Theatre Company. In the same year he played Sorin in The Seagull and directed The Importance of Being Earnest in which he also played Canon Chasuble. In 2012, he played the lead role of Sandy Sonnenberg in the Australian premiere of The Paris Letter by Jon Robin Baitz. In 2013 he appeared in Rosencrantz & Guildenstern are Dead at the Sydney Theatre Company and played Ludovico, Brabantio and Montano in Othello for independent theatre company Sport For Jove. In 2014 he created a new role in the world premiere of Aiden Fennessey's new play for two actors called The Way Things Work for the Tamarama Rock Surfers and directed by Leland Keen. His theatre work continues with regular appearances in independent productions including most recently as George in Who's Afraid of Virginia Woolf? for theatrongroup. In February 2017, he appeared as Howard in the Australian premiere of The Mystery Of Love & Sex by Bathsheba Doran at Sydney's Eternity Theatre. He appeared as Vinnie in The Odd Couple at The Ensemble Theatre and his performance was considered 'brilliant' by theatre critics including the Sydney Morning Herald

Papademetriou has had many roles in films such as Mission: Impossible 2, The Night We Called It a Day and Death in Brunswick. He has also appeared in a number of award-winning short films including Two Nights, In 2013 he wrote and directed a short film Swinger. The film has been selected in competition at a number of international film festivals including the Cyprus International Film Festival and The San Pedro International Film Festival.

== Filmography ==
=== Film ===
| Year | Title | Role | Notes |
|---|---|---|---|
| 1986 | Short Changed | Nick | Feature film |
| 1990 | Death in Brunswick | Yanni Voulgaris | Feature film |
| 1990 | Sparks | | Short film |
| 1991 | Bad News Bachelors | Stuart | Short film |
| 1991 | Gotcha | Father | Short film |
| 2000 | Mission: Impossible 2 | Prison Guard #2 | Feature film |
| 2002 | Redfern Beach | Boss | Short film |
| 2003 | The Night We Called It a Day | Luigi | Feature film |
| 2005 | Deus Ex Machina | Vincent | Short film |
| 2006 | Two Nights | Older Man | Short film |
| 2007 | Courts mais GAY: Tome 13 | Older Man | (segment "Two nights") |
| 2009 | Past Midnight | Bruno | Short film |
| 2013 | Section 209 | Short Interrogator | Short film |
| 2013 | Swinger | Narrator | Short film |
| 2016 | Caramel | BBQ Sauce | Short film |
| 2016 | The Veiled | Nico | Short film |
| 2017 | A Dusty Town | Cafe Owner | |
| 2017 | Dead, Not Dying | Severo | Short film |
| 2018 | Alone | Priest (voice) | Short film |
| 2020 | Side Effects | Dr. William Hartley | Short film |
| TBA | Closing Night | Frederick | Post-production |

=== Television ===
| Year | Title | Role | Notes |
|---|---|---|---|
| 1985 | Sons and Daughters | Nikos Dimitriou | Season 4 (7 episodes) |
| 1986 | Cyclone Tracy | Theo | Miniseries (3 episodes) |
| 1988, 2001 | Home and Away | Nico Pappas | Season 1 (19 episodes) |
| 1988, 2001 | Home and Away | Con Poulos | Season 14 (1 episode) |
| 1988 | Stringer | Yannis Moustakas | Season 1 (8 episodes) |
| 1992 | G.P. | Dino | Season 4 (1 episode) |
| 1993 | Stark | Aristos Tyron | Miniseries (3 episodes) |
| 1994 | Heartland | Harry Bradshaw | Season 1 (3 episodes) |
| 1998 | A Difficult Woman | Kodotis | Miniseries (3 episodes) |
| 1999, 2002, 2004, 2008 | All Saints | Marco Vuga | Season 2 (1 episode) |
| 1999, 2002, 2004, 2008 | All Saints | Bill Talbert | Season 5 (guest, 1 episode) |
| 1999, 2002, 2004, 2008 | All Saints | Dr. Mark Kendrick | Season 7 (1 episode) |
| 1999, 2002, 2004, 2008 | All Saints | Trev | Season 11 (1 episode) |
| 1999 | Heartbreak High | Carlos | Season 7 (1 episode) |
| 2000–03 | Grass Roots | Victor Trujillo | Seasons 1–2 (18 episodes) |
| 2001 | Water Rats | Tom Cruz | Season 6 (1 episode) |
| 2004 | Jessica | Coffin Nail | Miniseries |
| 2005 | BlackJack: In the Money | Demetriou | TV movie |
| 2005 | The Surgeon | Joe Elias | Season 1 (1 episode) |
| 2005 | headLand | Rodney Morgan | Season 1 (2 episodes) |
| 2009 | My Place | Michaelis | Season 1 (3 episodes) |
| 2012 | Tricky Business | Tass Theophanous | Season 1 (1 episode) |
| 2022 | Significant Others | Nikos | Miniseries (1 episode) |
