= Grant Mitchell (Home and Away) =

Fictional character from the Australian soap opera Home and Away

- Home and Away character
- Portrayed by: Craig McLachlan
- Duration: 1990–1991
- First appearance: 9 February 1990
- Last appearance: 20 September 1991
- Introduced by: Des Monaghan
In-universe information
- Occupation: Teacher
- Brothers: Wayne Mitchell
- Sisters: Debbie Mitchell; Kim Mitchell

Grant Mitchell is a fictional character from the Australian Channel Seven soap opera Home and Away, played by Craig McLachlan. Grant debuted on-screen during the episode airing on 9 February 1990. McLachlan had previously appeared on rival soap opera Neighbours playing Henry Ramsay. When his contract was due to be renewed, the Seven Network offered him a more flexible contract to appear in Home and Away, which McLachlan signed. Grant arrives in Summer Bay as a new teacher starting work at the local school. Grant is described as a likeable teacher with a good rapport with his pupils. His unorthodox teaching methods land him with the nickname "Cool Mitch".

McLachlan has admitted that he enjoyed exploring other avenues of acting through Grant and made a conscious effort to remove any traits of his previous character, Henry, from Grant. The character's storylines include contending with romantic intentions from his pupil Emma Jackson (Dannii Minogue), a relationship with Jane Holland (Josephine Mitchell) and discovering that his sister Kim Mitchell (Rachael Beck) is a drug addict. McLachlan decided to leave the series in 1990, but filmed additional scenes which were aired the following year. Grant made his final appearance on 20 September 1991.

== Casting ==
McLachlan previously played the role of Henry Ramsay on rival soap opera Neighbours In 1989, McLachlan's contract with the serial was due for renewal, but no longer enjoyed working there. A rival network made him an offer which involved television and film work and McLachlan signed the deal. However, the owner of the network fled Australia because his bid to buy MGM studios failed. While McLachlan's contract was cancelled, there was a clause that meant he could still appear in Home and Away. The serial's producers tempted McLachlan with a contract that would allow him to also concentrate on his music career while filming. In addition, a "large fee" was also paid to McLachlan upon his signing with the serial. McLachlan later admitted that Network Seven "fought hard" to sign him up. McLachlan initially divided his time between filming Sydney and completing music work with his rock band Check 1-2, in Melbourne. His character debuted on-screen during the episode broadcast on 9 February 1990.

== Character development ==
"His teaching methods are really quite highly unorthodox. He's into breaking down those teacher/pupil barriers and getting right in on the kids' level. When he gets in the classroom he really performs. All the kids love him and the establishment hate him at first. It's a really great character."

— McLachlan on Grant (1990)

Grant first scenes began airing in February 1990. McLachlan told a columnist for TV Week that in comparison to Henry, "Grant's a much cooler character, more mature. As he grows you'll see that he has a sense of humour, particularly in the classroom." McLachlan told author Kesta Desmond that it was good to play a more serious role and explore other areas of acting. He added that he had made a "conscious effort" to remove any "Henryisms" from the character of Grant. The actor told a writer from TV Stars that while Grant is teaching he just "wins the kids over". McLachlan told Desmond and David Nicholls for their book Home and Away Annual that Grant is anything but conventional. "He's pretty trendy for a teacher - he rebels against the establishment and the kids love him for it." McLachlan told a reporter from The Age that his character is very similar to fellow fictional teacher John Keating, from the film Dead Poets Society Grant "really digs" teaching and his pupils. While he is not a clone of John Keating, he is "certainly unorthodox". In his book Home and Away special, Clive Hopwood describes Grant as the "hunky teacher at the local school with unorthodox teaching methods, and one or two skeletons rattling quietly in the closet."

As Andrea Black wrote in the Home and Away – Official Collector's Edition, McLachlan "never needed an excuse to flex his muscles" during his time in the show. McLachlan explained that Grant does not much "boisterousness" in him, but this makes him "likeable". Grant likes "meditation and conversion" which is adds to his likability. McLachlan said that it depended on the audiences perception of the word unorthodox in deciding whether or not Grant's method of teaching did not follow tradition. He also added that Grant would have a "few surprises in store" when he takes part in a weightlifting competition. The role also required Mclachlan to film shirtless often. He told Hopwood that he did not mind because he was a "fitness fanatic" and was comfortable with his chest being shown. Grant is known to the students as "Cool Mitch" and especially the female students want to be the "teacher's pet". In one storyline, Grant has to contend with a school girl crush when Emma Jackson (Dannii Minogue) becomes attracted to him. Grant later begins a relationship with Jane Holland (Josephine Mitchell) and they made an "arresting couple" which was a main storyline during 1990. Mitchell told David Brown of TV Week that she took the role of Jane so she could work with McLachlan. She added that "there's a romance with Craig's character. She intermingles with a lot of the characters, but I guess her main interest is" Grant. Producers later cast Rachael Beck to play Grant's sister Kim Mitchell, who tries to hide her drug addiction from Grant.

In September 1990, it was announced that McLachlan had decided to leave the series in order to concentrate on his music career. David Brown from TV Week reported that McLachlan would film his final scenes in October 1990. He also filmed additional scenes which were broadcast in the following year. McLachlan filmed the scenes to honour a three-year contract he had signed with the Seven Network.

== Storylines ==
Grant arrives in Summer Bay and signs up for the town's Ironman competition, which Adam Cameron (Mat Stevenson) and fellow newcomer Ben Lucini (Julian McMahon) are also taking part in. Grant attracts the attention of Carly Morris (Sharyn Hodgson), who Ben is interested in. Grant manages to get Carly and Ben together by staging a fake fight in which Ben loses in order to make Carly feel sorry for him. A month after his arrival, Grant is revealed to be the new history teacher at Summer Bay. He quickly begins clashing with principal Donald Fisher (Norman Coburn), who is uncertain about Grant's teaching methods - such as getting the class to dance before the lesson in order for them to be energized, and re-enacting the Eureka Stockade. Grant eventually agrees to let Donald know about his ideas before testing them.

Emma develops a crush on Grant when they first meet, but is left embarrassed by it when she discovers that he is the school's new teacher. Vicki Baxter (Nana Coburn) takes her interest in Grant further by openly flirting with him. When Vicki visits Grant in his caravan, he is forced to set her straight and make clear nothing can ever happen between them. Vicki is wrongly led to believe that Grant has been making fun of her behind her back, so she makes an allegation that Grant has sexually assaulted her in order to pay him back. Although almost everybody in Summer Bay believes Grant is innocent, Donald is forced to suspend him. Emma goes on a crusade to force Vicki to tell her the truth. Vicki eventually withdraws the allegation after Donald points out how difficult it will be for her if she continues, and Grant is reinstated.

Grant meets Jane but is shocked to learn she is a police officer when she arrives on the scene of Grant and Alf Stewart's (Ray Meagher) car accident. Grant and Jane begin dating and she leaves the force. They later move in together but then regret it when Grant prefers spending time with his friends Ben and Matt Wilson (Greg Benson) to being at home with Jane. They end the relationship amicably and Jane leaves town. Grant helps new arrival Blake Dean (Les Hill) adjust to life in the Bay, and trains him for an Ironman contest. He tries to mediate the ill-feeling between Blake and new deputy principal Alan Stone (Philip Hinton). When Stone exceeds his authority, Grant argues against him with Donald and Stone leaves. Grant later has his own problem with Blake when he and his girlfriend Sophie Simpson (Rebekah Elmaloglou) leave their dorms to spend time together on a school trip. Grant agrees to keep quiet, but Donald finds out from another student and is annoyed that Grant kept it secret.

Grant's sister Kim arrives in town to stay with him and he is concerned when he learns that Kim has not told their parents where she is. He remains unaware that she has a drug habit until after Steven Matheson (Adam Willits) and Matt find out. Grant discovers drugs in Kim's bag and convinces her to go away with him to sort herself out, despite Donald warning him that his job will not be kept open. He returns to town once Kim has recovered and leaves soon afterwards to take a job in Timboon. He returns some months later looking for a job and helps a grieving Sophie, whose boyfriend David Croft (Guy Pearce) has just been killed in a car accident. He asks new school principal Lois Crawford (Tina Bursill) for a job and is shocked when she gives him Donald's job, demoting Donald to teaching Year 8 classes. After Grant, Donald's daughter Bobby Simpson (Nicolle Dickson) and several of the locals make it clear to Lois that they support Donald, he is reinstated and Grant leaves for good.

== Reception ==
For his portrayal of Grant, McLachan won the "Most Popular Actor" award at the 1991 Logie Awards. One month after his first appearance, Robin Olover of The Sydney Morning Herald said that Home and Away were already promoting McLachan as their "golden boy". In his book Neighbours special, Kesta Desmond said that McLachan looked "rather dapper" in the role of Grant in comparison to his role in Neighbours. Michael Idato of The Sydney Morning Herald said that Grant was one of the characters from the "golden years" that made Home and Away feel "very mid-'80s". A writer from TV Guide branded Grant the "human bicep" who, alongside Adam splashed around the waters of Summer Bay in their "merrily macho way". Unimpressed by their showmanship they joked, "where the hell is that shark now that we need him?" An Inside Soap reporter included Grant in a feature profiling soap opera characters with odd names. They noted that Grant Mitchell was never a problem name until rival soap opera EastEnders introduced a character with the same name.
