= List of Home and Away characters introduced in 1990 =

Home and Away is an Australian soap opera first broadcast on the Seven Network on 17 January 1988. The 3rd season of Home and Away began airing from 8 January 1990. The following is a list of characters that first appeared in 1990, by order of first appearance. They were all introduced by the show's executive producer Des Monaghan. In January, Rebekah Elmaloglou began appearing as Sophie Simpson. The following month Craig McLachlan and Julian McMahon took on the respective roles of school teacher Grant Mitchell and soldier Ben Lucini. March saw the introduction of Jaiman Paget Bayly as recurring character Murray "Mullet" Jensen. Beach House landlord Ernie Jacobs (David Weatherley) made his debut in April, along with Bridget Jackson played by Paula Duncan. Craig Black began his second role in the serial as student Paul Jensen in May. Josephine Mitchell joined the cast as policewoman Jane Holland. Les Hill and Belinda Jarrett joined the show in July as siblings Blake and Karen Dean. Kate Raison arrived in September playing the role of Jennifer Atkinson, a love interest for Steven Matheson (Adam Willits). October saw the arrival of divorcé Michael Ross, played by Dennis Coard. The following week, he was joined by his teenage son Haydn Ross, played by Andrew Hill. In November, Rachael Beck joined the cast as Grant's sister Kim Mitchell.

== Opening titles timeline ==
Color key
Main cast (opening credits)
Recurring guest star (closing credits in 3+ episodes)
Guest star (closing credits in 1–2 episodes)

Character	Actor	1989–90	1990					
Character	Actor	436–470	471–520	521–526	527–545	546–585	586–608	609–678
Tom Fletcher	Roger Oakley	M	M	M				
Pippa Fletcher	Vanessa Downing	M	M	M	M	M		
Pippa Fletcher	Debra Lawrence						M	M
Steven Matheson	Adam Willits	M	M	M	M	M	M	M
Carly Morris	Sharyn Hodgson	M	M	M	M	M	M	M
Sally Fletcher	Kate Ritchie	M	M	M	M	M	M	M
Ailsa Stewart	Judy Nunn	M	M	M	M	M	M	M
Alf Stewart	Ray Meagher	M	M	M	M	M	M	M
Bobby Simpson	Nicolle Dickson	M	M	M	M	M	M	M
Martin Dibble	Craig Thomson	M	M					
Lance Smart	Peter Vroom	M	M					
Donald Fisher	Norman Coburn	M	M	M	M	M	M	M
Celia Stewart	Fiona Spence	M	M					
Viv Newton	Mouche Phillips	M	M	M	M			
Adam Cameron	Mat Stevenson	M	M	M	M	M	M	M
Emma Jackson	Dannii Minogue	M	M	M	M	M	M	
Matt Wilson	Greg Benson	M	M	M	M	M	M	M
Grant Mitchell	Craig McLachlan	R	M	M	M	M	M	M
Sophie Simpson	Rebekah Elmaloglou	R	R	R	M	M	M	M
Ben Lucini	Julian McMahon		R	R	M	M	M	M
Marilyn Chambers	Emily Symons	R	R	R	M	M	M	M
Blake Dean	Les Hill						R	M
Karen Dean	Belinda Jarrett						R	M

== Sophie Simpson ==
Sophie Simpson, played by Rebekah Elmaloglou, debuted on-screen during the episode broadcast on 23 January 1990 and appeared until 1993. Elmaloglou once took a break from filming due to exhaustion, and quit the serial to pursue other projects as her work load took a negative impact on her health. Elmaloglou made subsequent guest appearances as Sophie in 2002, 2003 and 2005.

== Grant Mitchell ==
Grant Mitchell, played by Craig McLachlan, debuted on-screen during the episode broadcast on 9 February 1990. McLachlan departed the series that year, though filmed additional appearances which were not aired until the following year. Grant last appeared on 20 September 1991. McLachlan described Grant as being "pretty trendy for a teacher". Grant is "loved" by students because he chooses to rebel against the establishment. However, Grant loves teaching and his pupils. For his portrayal of Grant, MacLachan won the "Most Popular Actor" award at the 1991 Logie Awards.

== Ben Lucini ==
Benito "Ben" Lucini, played by Julian McMahon, debuted on-screen during the episode broadcast on 27 February 1990 and remained until 1 May 1991. McMahon had to audition four times, before the producers agreed that he was right for the role of Ben. Ben was described as being "relaxed" and "easy-going" for a twenty-one-year-old male. Ben is an Italian character and comes from a large family. Ben used to have a liking for partying and booze, but as he grew older he matured and changed his outlook in life. Ben is a soldier, he soon falls in love with the town and established character Carly Morris (Sharyn Hodgson) and leaves the army. Hodgson described Ben as having "traditional values" and "stability". Carly admires these traits and feels ready to settle down with him. Ben and Carly marry and Hodgson predicted that their marriage would be successful because they "really do want what is best for each other". McMahon quit Home and Away the same year that his character arrived. Peter Holmes of The Sydney Morning Herald was critical of McMahon's acting in the role, calling him "wooden" and saying he did "a splendid impression of a Thunderbird".

== Mullet ==
Mullet
- Home and Away character
- Portrayed by: Jaiman Paget Bayly
- First appearance: 26 March 1990
- Last appearance: 18 July 1990
- Introduced by: Des Monaghan
In-universe information
- Occupation: Student
- Father: Michael Jensen
- Mother: Lorraine Jensen
- Brothers: Paul Jensen

Murray "Mullet" Jensen, played by Jaiman Paget Bayly, first appeared on 26 March 1990 and departed on 18 July 1990. In their book Home and Away Annual, Kesta Desmond and David Nicholls describe Mullet as an "energetic and boisterous eleven-year-old". He is an "average country kid" with an "adventurous and cheeky" side to his persona. His real name is Murray, but due to his extreme liking for fishing, he adopts the nickname "Mullet". Mullet is also an outsider and "contents himself" with life's simple pleasures. He is the type of child that is easily entertained, more so with a fishing rod. Mullet's family live below the poverty line. His mother, Lorraine Jensen (Elizabeth Chance), has been unable to provide Mullet and his older brother, Paul Jensen (Craig Black), with the luxuries other children get. Mullet does not have pocket money, so he decides to sell his fish to Ailsa Stewart (Judy Nunn).

Mullet takes a liking to classmate Sally Fletcher (Kate Ritchie). Sally is annoyed with his constant following of her and avoids him at every opportunity. Eventually, Sally relents and they become friends. Mullet brings home a crab to the Fletcher family and they serve it up for dinner, not knowing that the crab is in fact, Alf Stewart's (Ray Meagher) pet crab "Claws". Alf is upset but Mullet offers to help him fish as way of an apology. When Sally asks about Mullet's home, he becomes evasive and refuses to let her see his house as his family does not have much money. Mullet goes as far to invent an excuse that his mother, Lorraine has been hospitalised after burning herself while cooking. Sally soon discovers the truth and tells him it does not matter and invites him to be a guest at Carly Morris (Sharyn Hodgson) and Ben Lucini's (Julian McMahon) wedding, which he accepts. When Mullet takes Tammy Newton (Katy Edwards) fishing, Sally becomes jealous. After Tammy leaves, Mullet and Sally audition for the Surf Club's talent night performing "There's a Hole in My Bucket" and on opening night they make several mistakes in the act, which raises a laugh from the audience who assume it is scripted but Sally does not see the funny side. Later in the evening, Mullet assists Adam Cameron (Mat Stevenson) in a magic trick where he creates the illusion of sawing his assistant Marilyn Chambers (Emily Symons) in half. The trick is ruined when Mullet, posing as Marilyn's feet, gets out of the box. After Marilyn gives Mullet and Sally dancing lessons and Mullet decides he wants to be a pop star and changes his image which does little to impress Sally and reverts to his old look. Mullet attends the wedding and dances with Sally at the reception. After this, Mullet is not seen again but he is mentioned by Steven Matheson (Adam Willits) a decade later when he teases Sally about past romances in the aftermath of her failed wedding to Kieran Fletcher (Spencer McLaren).

== Ernie Jacobs ==
Ernie Jacobs, played by David Weatherley, debuted on-screen during the episode broadcast on 16 April 1990 and last appeared on 9 January 1991.

Ernie rents the beach house out to Matt Wilson (Greg Benson), Adam Cameron (Mat Stevenson) and Marilyn Chambers (Emily Symons). The three decide to set Ernie up. Marilyn invites Ernie around for a date and attempts to seduce him. Matt and Adam wait outside with a camera, when Ernie kisses Marilyn, Adam takes a photograph. Matt notices that the picture has not developed correctly, but Adam enters the house and presents Ernie with the picture. After he and Matt burn the kitchen linoleum while making some toffee, Adam replaces it with turf that is infested with fleas, which then begin to populate the house. Ernie arrives at the house to confront Adam, but he detonates a flea bomb. Ernie throws the bomb out of the window, causing it to smash. He then threatens to evict his three tenants. Ernie runs for councillor and is happy when Alf Stewart (Ray Meagher) is forced to drop his campaign when he is charged with driving over the alcohol limit. Bobby Simpson (Nicolle Dickson) decides to run in direct competition to stop Ernie getting into power. Marilyn later finds an incriminating letter and she and Bobby blackmail Ernie. Ernie later sells the house to Marilyn.

== Bridget Jackson ==
Bridget Jackson
- Home and Away character
- Portrayed by: Paula Duncan
- First appearance: 20 April 1990
- Last appearance: 7 May 1990
- Introduced by: Des Monaghan
In-universe information
- Father: Harold O'Rourke
- Brothers: Tony O'Rourke
- Sisters: Ailsa Stewart
- Husband: Barry Jackson
- Sons: Troy Jackson; Justin Jackson
- Daughters: Emma Jackson

Bridget Jackson, played by Paula Duncan, made her first appearance on 20 April 1990. Duncan had a five-week contract, but producers were keen for her to sign on with the serial permanently. However, Duncan had received a number of other job offers at the same time. She told Glen Williams of TV Week: "Suddenly everybody wants me. It's a big decision for me whether or not to continue. I've got so many other things happening – not only as an actress, but also as a producer." Duncan was also reluctant to be parted from her husband John Orcsik, who was appearing in a play in Melbourne, and their children. Bridget is Emma Jackson's (Dannii Minogue) mother. Duncan called her character "absolutely dreadful", describing her as "raw and uneducated, she talks really rough, and she is like nothing I've ever played." Despite not being a nice character, Duncan enjoyed played Bridget, adding that she is "an absolute monster." Duncan also enjoyed working with Minogue, saying they got off to a good start and became really close.

After Bridget's daughter Emma attacks her stepfather in self-defence, she comes to stay with her aunt Ailsa Stewart (Judy Nunn), who was unaware Bridget had a child. Bridget and Ailsa are estranged because Ailsa killed their abusive father. Bridget later follows her daughter to Summer Bay and tells Ailsa's husband Alf Stewart (Ray Meagher) that she wants to take her back home. Ailsa refuses to let her sister take Emma, as she had only just settled into the Bay. It becomes clear that the sisters do not like each other and Ailsa later tells Bridget that Emma's stepfather abused her. She is not convinced when Bridget tells her she has separated from Barry. Bridget tries to talk with Emma, but she refuses to listen, until Bridget corners her on the beach and reveals that she asked Barry to leave after he confessed to abusing Emma. Ailsa and Bridget constantly clash and Emma becomes caught in the middle, until Bridget wins her over by buying her a new dress and taking her on a night out. She persuades Emma to come home and live with her again, but a few weeks later Emma returns and tells Alf that Bridget has not changed and has taken Barry back.

== Paul Jensen ==
Paul Jensen
- Home and Away character
- Portrayed by: Craig Black
- First appearance: 8 May 1990
- Last appearance: 22 August 1990
- Introduced by: Des Monaghan
In-universe information
- Occupation: Student; Shop assistant
- Father: Michael Jensen
- Mother: Lorraine Jensen
- Brothers: Murray Jensen

Paul Jensen, played by Craig Black, debuted on-screen during the episode 8 May 1990. Black previously played the role of Travis in one episode. Paul is seventeen years old when he first arrives in Summer Bay. He is the son of Michael and Lorraine Jensen (Elizabeth Chance) and the older brother of Mullet (Jaiman Paget Bayly). Paul is described as a "warm and articulated young man, slightly above average in academic ability." Paul is good friends with Steven Matheson (Adam Willits). Paul's father, Michael is a failed country and western musician. His failures caused the breakdown of his marriage with Lorraine. Paul is "blessed with a great musical talent far more than his father ever possessed". Lorraine becomes adamant that Paul will not pursue a career in music; despite his "obvious talent". Lorraine banned all musical instruments from being used in their home. Paul's talent is totally "self-taught" and by giving up his lunch breaks, he secretly practised on the school and surf club pianos. Paul's teacher Grant Mitchell (Craig McLachlan) recognises his talent. Grant defies Lorraine's wishes and stages a talent show to showcase Paul's musical skills.

Grant finds Paul playing the piano in secret on his lunch break. Grant tells Paul that he is talented and told him to apply for a music scholarship in order to afford his own instrument. Paul refuses the offer and takes a job at Alf Stewart's (Ray Meagher) shop instead and buys a second hand one. Lorraine becomes annoyed with Paul for running up her electricity bills. Grant helps Paul train, but Lorraine finds out and tells him that he is wasting his life attempting to pursue a music career. Paul tells Grant to leave him alone, so Grant organises a school concert with the aim of showing everyone Paul's talent, but he refuses to take part. Paul makes friends with Emma Jackson (Dannii Minogue) and develops an attraction to her. Emma starts to feel the same, despite already dating Adam Cameron (Mat Stevenson). Emma listens to Paul playing the piano and compliments him. Paul cannot handle the praise and Emma realises that he wrote the piece for her. Emma asks him to play the song for her again and then kisses him. Emma tells Paul that she is still with Adam.

Lorraine later decides to support Paul's musical ambitions and he takes part in the concert. When Adam finds out about Paul and Emma, he challenges Paul to a fight. The pair start brawling after Adam insults his father, Michael. Alf decides to set up a fair boxing match between the pair. Alf and Steven help Paul train. Emma tries to stop the fight but it goes ahead and soon gets out of hand. Emma is annoyed that two men are fighting over her, so Marilyn Chambers (Emily Symons), Sophie Simpson (Rebekah Elmaloglou) and Carly Morris (Sharyn Hodgson) help Emma sabotage the fight by throwing buckets of water over them. Paul is angry with Emma for embarrassing him and tries to end their relationship, but Emma talks him around. Vicki Baxter (Nana Coburn) plants exam papers in Emma's locker, causing her to be expelled from school. Paul is unsure of whether to believe that Emma is innocent, so she dumps him. Paul and Steven hatch a plan to prove that Vicki was behind the plot, by pretending to date her. Vicki confesses to planting them and Paul clears Emma's name. Ailsa Stewart (Judy Nunn) and Bobby Simpson (Nicolle Dickson) convince Emma that Paul is a good person and she forgives him. Emma secures a job on the Gold Coast and has to move away. She tells him that her feelings have changed, but still wants to remain friends and leaves him behind.

== Jane Holland ==
Jane Holland
- Home and Away character
- Portrayed by: Josephine Mitchell
- First appearance: 22 June 1990
- Last appearance: 29 August 1990
- Introduced by: Des Monaghan
In-universe information
- Occupation: Police constable

Jane Holland, played by Josephine Mitchell, made her first appearance on 22 June 1990. Mitchell began filming her guest stint in April 1990, she was contracted to appear in the show for two months. She stated "It's wonderful, but very demanding. The hours are much longer than in A Country Practice." Jane is a police constable, who is introduced as a love interest for Grant Mitchell (Craig McLachlan). Mitchell knew McLachlan socially before they worked together and described him as "a really lovely person." She was grateful to producer Andrew Howie for thinking of her for the role, as Jane was a different type of character for her to play. Mitchell was well known for playing Jo Loveday in A Country Practice at the time. She told David Brown from TV Week that Jane is completely different from Jo because the new role required her to be aggressive. She was also surprised to hear she had won the role of a police officer. Mitchell said: "Jane Holland is a young constable, with lots of emphasis on the word 'young'. She comes to Summer Bay and sets up shop there." The actress said that Jane "intermingles" with most of the serial's characters during her tenure, but her main interest is in Grant. Knowing she would be working with McLachlan was one of the reasons Mitchell wanted the role.

Jane arrives to work in Summer Bay and she soon begins to date Grant. Jane arrests Alf Stewart (Ray Meagher) for being over the legal alcohol limit after breathalysing him, which causes him to forfeit his license. When a shootout occurs in Yabbie Creek and an officer is killed, Grant fears the worst. Jane is found to be alive but is devastated over her colleague's death and is visibly affected. When two thugs harass Marilyn Chambers (Emily Symons) at the diner, Jane is quick to apprehend them. Grant worries and suggests she takes some time off. Jane contemplates quitting altogether. Over the next few weeks Jane and Grant's relationship fails and Jane returns to the police force in the city.

== Blake Dean ==
Blake Dean, played by Les Hill, made his first appearance on 26 July 1990. Hill had appeared in a couple of episodes of G.P. prior to his casting as Blake. His casting was publicised alongside Belinda Jarrett, who plays Blake's sister Karen Dean, in TV Week shortly before their on-screen introductions. Hill found the pace of production the "most daunting" aspect of working on the show. In their book Home and Away Annual, Kesta Desmond and David Nicholls describe Blake as being the "sort of boy any parent would be proud to call their son." Blake is "high spirited, loves life and lives it to the full". He has natural charm and is a quick thinker, this helps him to escape trouble. Blake tries to protect Karen from the scrapes she gets herself into. Hill later announced his departure from the series via an interview in TV Week. The actor has since reprised the role including guest appearances for the serial's fourteenth anniversary and the 4,000th episode.

== Karen Dean ==
Karen Dean
- Home and Away character
- Portrayed by: Belinda Jarrett
- Duration: 1990–1991, 1993
- First appearance: 26 July 1990
- Last appearance: 19 February 1993
- Introduced by: Des Monaghan (1990); Andrew Howie (1993)
In-universe information
- Occupation: Student at Summer Bay High
- Father: Les Bagley
- Mother: Margot Dean
- Brothers: Blake Dean
- Half-sisters: Roxanne Miller
- Uncles: Kevin Bagley; Alec Dean
- Nephews: David Simpson

Karen Dean, played by Belinda Jarrett, made her first appearance on 26 July 1990. Jarrett had no television acting experience prior to being cast. Of joining the show, Jarrett stated "It's a dream come true. I'm a huge Home and Away fan. I usually wolf my dinner down so I don't miss an episode. It's amazing to think I'm now a part of all the goings-on taking place in Summer Bay." Jarrett and Les Hill's casting details were publicised in TV Week shortly before their on-screen introduction as siblings Karen and Blake Dean. The pair arrive in Summer Bay after their mother, Margot dies from cancer. Karen and Blake come into the care of Ailsa Stewart (Judy Nunn), and her husband Alf Stewart (Ray Meagher). Their fictional backstory details how it was their mother's dying wish to be cared for by her friend Ailsa, however, they chose to love with a "distant" uncle on a farm. But after they are treated like "virtual slaves", they give the Stewarts a go. Glen Williams of TV Week reported that Karen and Blake would have some "exciting storylines" to make them popular with viewers.

Writers of the Home and Away Annual, David Nicholls and Kesta Desmond described her early characterisation, stating "Karen is fifteen years old when she arrives in Summer Bay, an "attractive" yet "slightly reserved girl" she spends her time experimenting with her image. Karen watches her weight and hair because she has body image issues. She has a "sweet nature, a ready, tough sometimes, self-conscious smile, and a joyous love of life." They described her love life as being in the "awakening stages" but does not like boys her own age. Karen is popular at school with both pupils and teachers alike. However, the duo incorrectly predicted that she would follow a successful career path and develop a beautiful personality as she reaches womanhood. In March 1991, David Brown of TV Week confirmed that the network had chosen not to renew Jarrett's contract and that she had been told her character would be written out. Brown reported that Seven made the decision because the character did not have a high profile and was not as popular with viewers. Jarrett filmed her exit storyline in May, and Karen departed on 27 August 1991. In September 1992, Brown reported that Jarrett would be returning to the show for a "short stint", as her character is released from prison. She made her final appearance on 19 February 1993.

Karen and Blake arrive in town looking for Ailsa Stewart (Nunn), their mother Margot's former cellmate. They want to stay with her after they fall out with their uncle Alec Dean (Norm Galton). Ailsa's husband Alf (Meagher) is resistant at first but she talks him around. Karen and Blake get into many scrapes when they befriend Sophie Simpson (Rebekah Elmaloglou). Karen takes an interest in Steven Matheson (Adam Willits) after learning his girlfriend, Viv Newton (Mouche Phillips) has sent him a letter ending their relationship. Karen tries various methods to get time alone with Steven but they backfire, so she sends him an anonymous love letter. Steven assumes Sophie wrote the letter but she sets him straight. Ailsa discovers Karen's feelings for Steven after she denies it. The truth is revealed and Steven tells Karen he is flattered but it cannot work as he is several years older than her. Karen begins to feel left out when Blake and Sophie begin dating.

Karen and Blake soon find themselves the target of new deputy principal Alan Stone's (Philip Hinton) rage when he exceeds his authority by reinstating caning. Stone is eventually transferred elsewhere. Karen falls for Haydn Ross (Andrew Hill) when he transfers to Summer Bay High but is crushed when it becomes clear he is attracted to Sophie. This puts strain on their friendship but Karen and Sophie convince Blake and Haydn to become friends. When a tree planted by Alf's grandfather, Angus is under threat, Karen takes part in a protest and chains herself to the tree. When Maurice "Revhead" Gibson (Gavin Harrison) returns to Summer Bay, Karen is attracted to him. Alf is quick to warn her about Revhead as he is a criminal and tried to sexually assault his daughter Roo Stewart (Justine Clarke) two years previously. Karen refuses to listen and continues dating Revhead, who drags her into crime, including a robbery on Alf's store. Revhead tells Karen to join him on the run and tells her to steal Blake and Haydn's Morris Minor. That night Adam Cameron (Mat Stevenson) tries to talk sense into Karen to get her to return by jumping into the car but they crash into David Croft (Guy Pearce). Adam escapes with minor injuries and David is killed instantly. After initially blaming Adam, Karen then confesses and is arrested and imprisoned for two years.

Karen is paroled in early 1993 and returns to the Bay and resumes living with the Stewarts and meets her and Blake's long-lost half-sister, Roxanne Miller (Lisa Lackey). Blake is shocked to learn that Karen's time in prison has not changed her, especially when she starts a fight in a nightclub, which results in Blake getting punched while trying to defend her. Ailsa and Blake's girlfriend, Finlay Roberts (Tina Thomsen) are irritated by Karen's attitude. Karen then steals some money from Ailsa and flees to the city. Blake tracks her down where she is staying with a former cellmate. Karen refuses to return so Blake moves to the city in order to keep an eye on her.

== Jennifer Atkinson ==
Jennifer Atkinson
- Home and Away character
- Portrayed by: Kate Raison
- First appearance: 12 September 1990
- Last appearance: 16 October 1990
- Introduced by: Des Monaghan
In-universe information
- Other names: Jennifer Stewart
- Husband: Daniel Atkinson
- First cousins: Alf Stewart

Jennifer Atkinson, played by Kate Raison, made her first appearance on 12 September 1990. Raison's casting was publicised in TV Week on 4 August 1990. David Brown reported that she had joined the show for an eight-week guest stint as Jennifer Stewart. He confirmed that she was filming a romance storyline with Adam Willits (who plays Steven Matheson), in which she would be "the 'older woman', whose affair with teenage Steven will rock the Bay." In their book Home and Away Annual, Kesta Desmond and David Nicholls described Jennifer as "an artist who draws his attention for what turns out to be a pretty torrid affair". They added that it could all "end in tears" for the couple. A columnist from Inside Soap also named their affair "torrid", adding that Jennifer "taught Steven everything he knew".

Jennifer is Alf Stewart's (Ray Meagher) cousin who visits Summer Bay. When the subject of her husband Daniel Atkinson (Ken Radley) is approached, Jennifer is evasive. She reveals to Donald Fisher (Norman Coburn) and Bobby Simpson (Nicolle Dickson) that Daniel is an alcoholic and hits her. Steven Matheson is attracted to Jennifer and they begin a relationship. Steven lies that he is older than 17 and does not attend school, but is at college. When Steven sees Alan Stone (Philip Hinton) kissing Jennifer, he is jealous and trashes Alan's caravan. Jennifer tells Steven that Alan came on to her and he is an old friend of Daniel's. Jennifer and Steven later have sex. Alan catches Steven and Jennifer kissing and phones Daniel and informs him of the relationship, which results in Daniel hitting Steven over the head with a large tree branch, injuring him. Jennifer later ends things with Steven and leaves the Bay, but not before telling Steven to go back to school and complete Year 12. She later sends Steven a card at Christmas and he visits the city intending to see her, but he changes his mind.

== Michael Ross ==
Michael Ross
- Home and Away character
- Portrayed by: Dennis Coard
- Duration: 1990–1996
- First appearance: 22 October 1990
- Last appearance: 30 April 1996
- Introduced by: Des Monaghan
In-universe information
- Occupation: Boat shed owner Foster parent
- Wife: Cynthia Ross (1974–1989); Pippa Fletcher (1991–1996)
- Sons: Haydn Ross; Dale Ross
- Daughters: Kate Ross
- Adoptive sons: Christopher Fletcher
- Stepdaughters: Sally Fletcher

Michael Ross, played by Dennis Coard, made his first appearance on 22 October 1990. The character was introduced along with his son Haydn Ross (Andrew Hill). He quickly became a love interest for Pippa Fletcher (Debra Lawrance). Michael and Pippa strike up a friendship, but her family "are a bit wary of the man in their mother's life." Pippa tells them that nothing is going on, but after going out to dinner with Michael, she becomes "defensive" about the relationship. Michael assures her that he wants to be good friends, but David Brown of TV Week reported that they would end the year with a kiss and their relationship would move "into top gear" during the new year. He also reported that drama would come in the form of Michael's former wife who turns up in Summer Bay. Another columnist for TV Week said that Michael's relationship with Pippa was controversial and had people's "tongues wagging". This was because Pippa was still mourning the loss of her husband Tom Fletcher (Roger Oakley) and Michael was a divorcé. In 1996, producers took the decision to write the character out by killing him off. After five and a half years in the role, Coard believed it was the right time for him to leave, saying "the finality of it doesn't worry me because, if he hadn't been killed off, in a year's time they might have lured me back. But once I'd made the break, I'd much rather get on and do other things." On-screen, heavy rains cause a flood and mudslide, which Sam Marshall (Ryan Clark) gets caught up in. Michael saves Sam, but is swept away and drowned. Coard was pleased that Michael received a heroic "grand finale". He added that Michael would not be returning as a ghost to Pippa, commenting "I heard a rumour about it but I said no!"

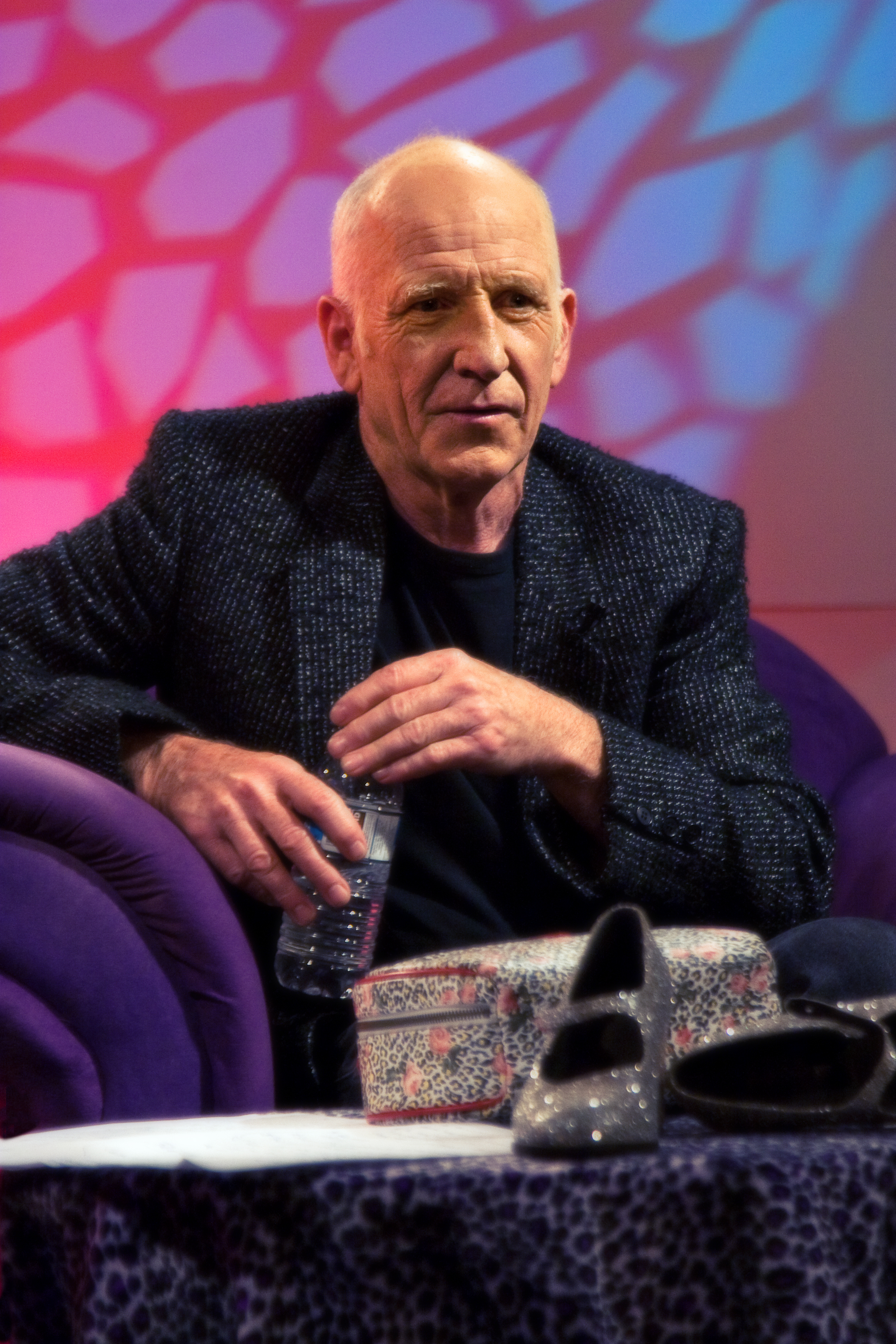
Dennis Coard played Michael from 1990 to 1996.

Michael arrives in Summer Bay as the new owner of the local boat shed and begins staying in the caravan park. Ben Lucini (Julian McMahon) takes an instant dislike to Michael because he had intended to purchase the business himself. Michael is soon joined by his teenage son, Haydn Ross who is unhappy at having had to leave his private boarding school and move into a caravan. Michael is attracted to Pippa Fletcher, but she is unsure of her feelings because her husband Tom had died only six months before. In time, he and Pippa start dating. Pippa's adoptive daughter, Sally (Kate Ritchie) and Michael's son Haydn resent the new relationship at first but later come to terms with it. Michael and Pippa's fledging relationship meets a bump in the road when his ex-wife Cynthia (Belinda Giblin) arrives in the Bay hoping to give their marriage another go. She manages to manipulate Pippa into breaking up with Michael but her plan is ultimately unsuccessful. Michael and Pippa resume their relationship.

When Michael nearly drowns in an accident at the boat shed, he is spurred into asking Pippa to marry him. Although the two of them have admitted that they love each other, Pippa turns him down because she is scared of getting hurt again. Michael is devastated but when he finally gets through to her a few days afterwards, she says yes. After their wedding, Michael adopts Pippa's son, Christopher (Shaun Wood) as well as taking responsibility for various foster children. Some months later, Haydn falls out with Michael and moves away to live with his mother. The following year, Michael and Pippa learn they are expecting their first child and Pippa gives birth to their son, Dale. Within a few weeks, Dale dies of SIDS, leaving them devastated. Dale's death puts a severe strain on their marriage but they overcome that. A year later, Haydn returns to Summer Bay out of the blue. Although he convinces Michael that he wants to settle in the area and to set up a surf shop, it is all an elaborate ruse. He is a gambling addict with large debts that need paying. He steals the money Michael has borrowed from the bank to help him get started. He leaves his father in debt, something that has repercussions further down the line. Although Michael tries to help Haydn deal with his addiction, it does not work. Haydn is not ready to stop gambling and he leaves the Bay again.

Left heavily in debt because of Haydn's stunt, Michael puts the boat shed up for auction. It does not sell but Alf Stewart (Ray Meagher) later offers to step in as a silent business partner. Michael continues to run the business. Still, the stress of paying off Haydn's debt, trying to run the boat shed, the caravan park, a kiosk in the surf club and raising 6 kids takes its toll on him. He starts to feel he is being taken for granted by the kids and comes under a lot of stress. Worse still, it causes cracks to appear in his marriage to Pippa. Just before Christmas, Michael decides that the only way to save their marriage is for him to move out. He goes to live in the storeroom over his boat shed. On Christmas Day, the troubles at home drive a distraught Sally to run away from home for a while. Irene Roberts (Lynne McGranger) suggests to Michael that he and Pippa should try marriage counselling. He takes her advice and books a counsellor. It takes a little time but the counselling works and he gets back together with Pippa.

Michael and Alf fall out over a new time-share development, but they put their quarrel to one side and resume their friendship. When a small seaplane crashes in the outback Michael, Joseph "Joe" Lynch (Justin Rosniak), Jack Wilson (Daniel Amalm), Shane Parrish (Dieter Brummer) go out to find the six missing occupants. They find Angel Parrish (Melissa George), Dylan Parrish (Corey Glaister) and Teresa Lynch (Diane Craig) alive, but the pilot did not survive. They soon realise that two other passengers are missing and Michael sets out to find them. He discovers a handmade bag with shells in it before he finds the body of the Yugoslavian man but finds his daughter Maya Krakajcek (Xenia Natalenko) and takes her to hospital. With both her parents deceased and there being no other relatives, Maya comes to live at the Ross's. Jan Connolly (Pat Pitney) takes her back to Yugoslavia after some relatives of Maya's are found there. Michael is devastated because he had really bonded with the girl and she was the first foster child he had brought into his home.

When a large flood devastates Summer Bay as a result of a storm, Michael and Jack go out into the night to pick up Sam Marshall. Sam falls into the flooded stream and Michael jumps in to save him. Sam makes it safely to land but Michael finds himself in difficulty. Jack tries to hold on to him but the current is too strong and Michael is swept downstream. The next day, Michael's body is found and Steven Matheson (Adam Willits) breaks the news to Pippa that Michael has died.

== Haydn Ross ==
Haydn Ross, played by Andrew Hill, first appeared on 31 October 1990 and departed on 17 September 1991. He returned in 1994 and 1996. Hill told Nigel May from Look-in that he won the role of Haydn by chance because agent made a mistake during the application process. In 1991, Hill decided to leave the series. A columnist for TV Week said that when Haydn arrives in Summer Bay, he thinks it is a "hick town". Haydn is the son of Cynthia (Belinda Giblin) and Michael Ross (Dennis Coard), he benefited from his father's business by attending a private school. In their book Home and Away Annual Kesta Desmond and David Nicholls describe Haydn as being "athletic and determined like his father"; but like his mother, too, because he has a "love of culture and a comfortable lifestyle".

== Kim Mitchell ==
Kim Mitchell
- Home and Away character
- Portrayed by: Rachael Beck
- First appearance: 8 November 1990
- Last appearance: 15 November 1990
- Introduced by: Des Monaghan
In-universe information
- Brothers: Grant Mitchell; Wayne Mitchell
- Sisters: Debbie Mitchell

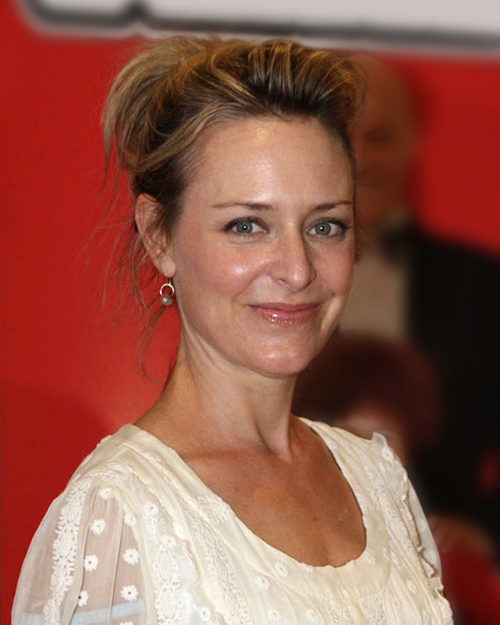
Rachael Beck plays Kim Mitchell.

Kim Mitchell, played by Rachael Beck, first appeared on-screen during the episode broadcast 8 November 1990. Beck was cast in the role of Kim, who was introduced as the sister of established character Grant Mitchell (Craig McLachlan). Producers decided that they wanted Kim to become a regular character and offered Beck a twelve-month contract. Beck turned down the offer because she did not want to become a typecast actress.

Kim arrives in Summer Bay and tries to conceal a drug addiction, despite the fact that she is only sixteen. Beck told Kesta Desmond and David Nicholls for their book Home and Away Annual that "Kim's appearance belies her bizarre behaviour, she keeps herself immaculately groomed." Beck said that while Kim makes an effort to apply make-up and sport "beautiful clothes", she is actually aware of her addiction behind the facade. Kim thinks that "everyone else is doing it" and uses this as a reason to defend her addiction. Beck said that Kim lives by the motto of "Why not enjoy life to the full while you are young?"

Kim arrives to visit her brother, Grant. She steals some money left by the phone by Grant's flatmate Matt Wilson (Greg Benson). Matt and Steven Matheson (Adam Willits) discover Kim is a drug addict when she asks both of them if they can get hold of some drugs for her. They both agonise about telling Grant. When Kim fails to return home from a night out in Yabbie Creek, Grant is worried and when she returns Kim invents a story. Matt urges Kim to come clean about her habit. Kim then begins stealing to fund her habit. She steals Carly Lucini's (Sharyn Hodgson) purse while she is distracted and spends the money on a picnic for her and Grant. Matt issues an ultimatum to Kim; return to Carly's purse or he will tell Grant the truth. Kim then steals a cheque from Grant to pay Eddie (Peter Williams), a dealer and forges his signature. Steven eventually tells Grant and he is shocked as, he originally put Kim's behaviour down to typical teenage problems. Grant searches Kim's bag and discovers speed pills and pours them down the sink. He then takes her to task about it and she reveals she has been using for several months. Grant seeks advice and arranges for Kim to go to rehab, Kim is grateful as she finds Grant has effectively sacrificed his position at Summer Bay High to go with her. After Grant phones their parents about going holiday but does not mention the drugs, Kim thanks him but he tells her he did it for their parents and will tell them should she relapse. They leave. Grant returns several months later and reveals Kim has made progress.

== Others ==
Date(s)	Character	Actor	Circumstances
8 January	Robbo	Ned Manning	Robbo is a vet who shark hunter Zac Burgess (Mark Conroy) brings to Summer Bay to prove that a shark that was caught was the one that killed Rory Heywood (Gregor Jordan) several weeks earlier. Adam Cameron (Mat Stevenson) and Andrew Foley (Peter Bensley) are suspicious and ask Robbo to cut up the shark to prove so. The shark is found not to be the one that killed Rory.
29 January	Henry Thompson	Tim Allen	Henry and Doris are prospective buyers of the Blaxland mansion previously owned by Morag Bellingham (Cornelia Frances). They are scared off when they see Emma Jackson (Dannii Minogue) and Celia Stewart (Fiona Spence) performing an exorcism when they believe the house is haunted.
29 January	Doris Thompson	Jane Archer	Henry and Doris are prospective buyers of the Blaxland mansion previously owned by Morag Bellingham (Cornelia Frances). They are scared off when they see Emma Jackson (Dannii Minogue) and Celia Stewart (Fiona Spence) performing an exorcism when they believe the house is haunted.
2–16 February	Greta	Jodie Gilles	Greta is a friend of Marilyn Chambers (Emily Symons). Marilyn tries to set Greta up with Martin Dibble (Craig Thomson). Martin is resistant due to Greta's plain look and is often embarrassed to be seen with her but he later begins enjoying her company and starts feeling more for her. Greta leaves shortly after.
9 February–1 March	Detective Hunt	Kim Knuckey	Detective Hunt arrests Donald Fisher (Norman Coburn) after he confesses to the murder of Shane Wilson eight years previous. Donald tells Hunt that Al Simpson (Terence Donovan) has been blackmailing him for $10,000. Hunt questions Simpson but he denies it and Donald is charged with Shane's murder. After a Ballistics test, Hunt informs Donald that his gun was not the rifle used to kill Shane but still may face charges. Donald's daughter, Bobby (Nicolle Dickson) begins hounding Al but Hunt warns her about the ramifications. When Simpson holds his daughter Sophie (Rebekah Elmaloglou) hostage along with Bobby and Shane's brother, Matt Wilson (Greg Benson) overnight in a shed, Hunt arrives the next morning and arrests Simpson after overhearing his confession of the murder.
27 February–8 March	Dave Porter	John Adam	Dave is a friend of Ben Lucini (Julian McMahon) who arrives on leave from the army with him. Dave tries to get Carly Morris's (Sharyn Hodgson) attention but she is more interested in Ben. Dave's wild partying ways serve only to annoy Ben and mess things up with Carly. Dave tries to sabotage Adam Cameron's (Mat Stevenson) bet on Ben during the Ironman contest after making a bet with him. Dave later bets on the beauty pageant but is later rumbled by Celia Stewart (Fiona Spence) who threatens to expose him.
12 March	Travis	Craig Black	Travis is a student in Grant Mitchell's (Craig McLachlan) Year 12 class.
30 March–3 April	Reverend Christopher Goodhope	Ron Becks	Reverend Goodhope is an African reverend who arrives as a guest of Celia Stewart (Fiona Spence) during her crusade to raise money for African orphans. Celia's brother Alf (Ray Meagher) reluctantly agrees to put him up at his place. When Emma Jackson (Dannii Minogue) and her friend Viv Newton (Mouche Phillips) come home one day, they assume Goodhope is a burglar and call the police. He is arrested and maintains he is a guest of the Stewarts', fortunately Celia arrives and manages to explain and he is released. Celia is mortified but Goodhope sees the funny side and even cites it as the high point of the trip. He later leaves to stay in the city and Celia decides to join him as a missionary in Africa.
6 April 1990, 21 May 2007 – 26 January 2012	Delivery Man	Steve Cox	An unseen delivery man who brings some cupboards to the Surf Club. On his first on-screen appearance in 2007, he brings a drink order to the Surf Club and asks Tony Holden (Jon Sivewright) how Beth Hunter (Clarissa House) is, not knowing Beth died the previous month. In 2011, he arrives at Leah Patterson-Baker's (Ada Nicodemou) house with a cot. Leah tells him to take it away but he refuses. In 2012, he delivers a cake from Charlie Buckton (Esther Anderson) to Bianca Scott (Lisa Gormley).
16 April–11 September	Des Thompson	Brian Harrison	Des is a bank manager visited by Carly Morris when she wants to take out a loan of $500 to pay Adam Cameron. He grants her the money but with a two-week waiting period. Des reappears when Carly and her husband Ben Lucini (Julian McMahon) take out a loan in order to buy the local boatshed.
17–26 April	Melody	Suzi Dougherty	Melody begins renting a room at the Beach House with Adam Cameron (Mat Stevenson) and Matt Wilson (Greg Benson). The guys are clearly attracted to her but Melody proves to be unreliable with rent. She moves her boyfriend Bruce (Bill Charlton) in after he is paroled. Adam and Matt devise a plan to get rid of them by exploiting Bruce's fear of snakes and bring one into the house, prompting the couple to flee.
18 April	Peter Butcher	Matthew Booker	Peter is a student in Year 10 who taunts Sophie Simpson (Rebekah Elmaloglou) about her illiteracy.
25–26 April	Bruce	Bill Charlton	Bruce is the boyfriend of Melody (Suzi Dougherty), who moves into the beach house with her after he is paroled from prison after serving time for assault. Melody's flatmates Adam Cameron (Mat Stevenson) and Matt Wilson (Greg Benson), are intimidated by Bruce's stature and violent past. When Bruce reveals he is afraid of snakes, Adam and Matt take advantage of this and bring one into the house, prompting the couple to flee.
3 May–17 July	Minister	John Mann	A local Reverend who presides over the funeral service of Tom Fletcher (Roger Oakley) and later the wedding ceremony of Carly Morris (Sharyn Hodgson) and Ben Lucini (Julian McMahon).
8 May–19 June	Lorraine Jensen	Elizabeth Chance	Lorraine is the mother of Paul (Craig Black) and Murray Jensen (Jaiman Paget Bayly) and is separated from their father Michael. She works in a local bookie's in order to support her children. Lorraine uncovers Mullet's lie about her being burned in order to prevent Sally Fletcher (Kate Ritchie) coming over to see their home. Lorraine disapproves of Paul wanting to follow in his father's footsteps when he begins playing the piano and wants him to focus on his studies. She eventually relents.
15 May–27 July	Doctor Walker	Earle Cross	A local doctor who attends to Marilyn Chambers (Emily Symons) when she is suffering from chicken pox and later Ben Lucini (Julian McMahon) when he suffers food poisoning. Bobby Simpson (Nicolle Dickson) visits Walker when she is feeling unwell and he examines her and reveals she is pregnant.
21–24 May	Helen Wakefield	Shayne Foote	Helen is a social worker from the Department of Childcare Services. She arrives to investigate Tammy Newton's (Katy Edwards) claims of her father John (John Gregg) abusing her after she runs away. While Helen tries to find Tammy and her sister Viv (Mouche Phillips) a new foster home, she is contacted by their mother, Angela (Annie Byron) who is searching for her daughters and wants to meet them. Helen then sets up a meeting between Angela and the girls.
21–23 May	Megan Tierney	Pamela Hawkesford	Megan is an old school friend of Carly Morris (Sharyn Hodgson) who arrives in Summer Bay. She boasts of her wealth, having married into money and looks down on the area, which does not sit well with Bobby Simpson (Nicolle Dickson). Megan and her husband Julian invite Carly and her fiancé Ben Lucini (Julian McMahon to join them for dinner at an expensive restaurant. During dinner, Julian tires of Megan's spending and they argue. Megan returns her credit card to him and leaves the restaurant.
23 May	Julian Tierney	Cranston Brecht	Julian is Megan's (Pamela Hawkesford) wealthy husband who tires of her constant spending and they argue while on a dinner date with Carly Morris (Sharyn Hodgson) and Ben Lucini (Julian McMahon).
23–25 May	Angela Newton	Annie Byron	Angela is the estranged mother of Viv (Mouche Phillips) and Tammy Newton (Katy Edwards). She arrives in Summer Bay to find her daughters with the help of Helen Wakefield (Shayne Foote) from the Department of Childcare Services. The girls are shocked to see Angela as their father, John (John Gregg) had lied and told them that she had died when Tammy was only a year old. Angela reveals that she left to get away from John's religious fanaticism. After reuniting, the Newtons leave the bay to move to Queensland where Angela works on a lavender farm.
29 May–5 September	Chris Reynolds	Jay Hackett	Chris appears when Bobby Simpson (Nicolle Dickson) joins a dating agency in the wake of her divorce from Frank Morgan (Alex Papps). On Chris and Bobby's first date, another candidate Geoff Lime (William Usic) is present when he gets his dates mixed up which leads to an awkward evening with both men bickering over Bobby. Chris wins out but is discovered to be married and is warned off by Bobby's father Donald Fisher (Norman Coburn) and her uncle Alf Stewart (Ray Meagher) and he leaves. He returns several months later to find his wife Wendy (Liz Newman) and their daughter, Suzie (Sophia Davidson) after they leave him and he learns that Bobby is pregnant. They try to keep it a secret but the truth is revealed after Wendy overhears a conversation about it. After Wendy rejects Chris, He comes after Bobby in a foul mood blaming her for the breakup of his marriage but she is able to get away. Chris then snatches Suzie, much to Wendy's worry. Grant Mitchell (Craig McLachlan) convinces Chris to accept his marriage is over and to return Suzie to Wendy. Chris, rejected by both Wendy and Bobby, leaves defeated.
29 May–19 October	Geoff Lime	William Usic	Geoff appears when Bobby Simpson (Nicolle Dickson) joins a dating agency in the wake of her divorce from Frank Morgan (Alex Papps). Geoff meets Bobby and discovers she is on a date with Chris (Jay Hackett). Both men refuse to budge, leading to an awkward evening when they bicker over Bobby. Bobby chooses Chris and Geoff leaves. Geoff returns several months later and learns Bobby has since broken up with Chris and is pregnant with his child. He offers to stand by Bobby and attends ante-natal classes with her but his mother, Hazel (Kaye Stevenson) warns Bobby off her son. In spite of this, He pursues Bobby who tells him she is willing to try, but not to expect a long-lasting relationship. He later proposes to Bobby who accepts but later breaks the engagement after realising she has made a mistake.
12–15 June	Gus	Harry Lawrence	Gus is a homeless man who lives in a shack by the beach and befriends Sophie Simpson (Rebekah Elmaloglou) who skips school after being teased. Gus takes Sophie metal detecting on the beach, which is witnessed by Sophie's foster mother, Pippa Fletcher (Vanessa Downing). Pippa asks Gus to help Sophie see reason in returning to school and he invents a plan where he goes back on his word about sharing unearthed treasure with Sophie and tells her that he is keeping anything he finds for himself. Sophie concedes defeat and returns to school.
27 June–23 July	Sheree Anderson	Beth Champion	Sheree is a friend of Vicki Baxter (Nana Coburn). She is witness to Vicki's plans to frame Emma Jackson (Dannii Minogue) for stealing an exam paper and to seduce Paul Jensen (Craig Black) away from Emma.
11–18 July	Francesca Lucini	Kim Leon	Ben Lucini's (Julian McMahon) sister, who arrives for Ben's wedding to Carly Morris (Sharyn Hodgson). Francesca is attracted to Carly's foster brother, Steven Matheson (Adam Willits). She tries to seduce him which provokes the ire of Angelo (Raj Sidhu), her cousin who is also in love with her.
11–18 July	Gina Lucini	Arianthe Galani	Ben Lucini's (Julian McMahon) parents. On the day of Ben's wedding to Carly Morris (Sharyn Hodgson) when it looks like Ben has gotten cold feet, Antonio offers Carly words of comfort as he went through a similar experience with Ben's mother on their wedding day. Gina effectively manages to take over the Fletcher house and criticises Grant Mitchell's (Craig McLachlan) wedding speech and continually insists he toasts the bridesmaids, which he eventually does.
11–18 July	Antonio Lucini	Alistair Duncan	Ben Lucini's (Julian McMahon) parents. On the day of Ben's wedding to Carly Morris (Sharyn Hodgson) when it looks like Ben has gotten cold feet, Antonio offers Carly words of comfort as he went through a similar experience with Ben's mother on their wedding day. Gina effectively manages to take over the Fletcher house and criticises Grant Mitchell's (Craig McLachlan) wedding speech and continually insists he toasts the bridesmaids, which he eventually does.
12–18 July	Angelo	Raj Sidhu	Angelo is the cousin of Ben Lucini (Julian McMahon). He arrives to serve as best man for Ben's wedding to Carly Morris (Sharyn Hodgson) and quickly makes himself unpopular in town after nearly running over Alf Stewart (Ray Meagher) and picking a fight with Steven Matheson (Adam Willits) after seeing him with his cousin Francesca (Kim Leon), which sees Angelo come off worst. He takes part in prank with Adam Cameron (Mat Stevenson) on Ben's buck's night by removing Ben's trousers and having him dumped in a back of truck several miles out of town, causing Ben to almost miss the wedding. When Angelo touches Francesca on the bottom at the reception, she knocks him to the floor with one punch.
30 July	Alec Dean	Norm Galton	Alec is the uncle of Blake (Les Hill) and Karen (Belinda Jarrett) who assumes custody of them after his sister, Margot's death. The teens run away to Summer Bay after they find life on Alec's farm miserable. Alec later arrives in Summer Bay after Ailsa Stewart (Judy Nunn) informs him of their whereabouts. Alec leaves after agreeing Blake and Karen should stay with Ailsa and her husband Alf (Ray Meagher).
9 August	Anna	Rebecca George	Anna is the cousin of Vicki Baxter (Nana Coburn) who helps her frame Emma Jackson (Dannii Minogue) for the theft of some exam papers at Summer Bay High. Steven Matheson (Adam Willits) and Paul Jensen (Craig Black) track her down under the pretence that Vicki needs her and the three of them let Donald Fisher (Norman Coburn) know. Anna urges Vicki to confess and she does and Emma is reinstated at school.
29 August–5 September	Wendy Reynolds	Liz Newman	Wendy is Chris Reynolds' (Jay Hackett) wife who leaves him after learning of his numerous affairs. She leaves their daughter Suzie (Sophia Davidson) with Bobby Simpson (Nicolle Dickson) while she visits a friend. Wendy later rents a caravan from Pippa Fletcher (Debra Lawrence) and begins staying in the park. Bobby realises she is Chris' wife and denies they had a relationship. Wendy then finds out Chris is the father of Bobby's unborn baby after Chris tries to reconcile and throws him out. When Chris snatches Suzie in retaliation, Wendy is worried. Suzie is eventually returned and they leave.
29 August–5 September	Suzie Reynolds	Sophia Davidson	Suzie is daughter of Chris (Jay Hackett) and Wendy (Liz Newman). When her parents separate, Liz brings Suzie to Summer Bay. Chris follows and snatches Suzie when Wendy rejects him. Suzie is later returned to her mother, safely.
6 September	Vince McGrath	Felix Nobis	Vince is a delivery man from Coastal Video who arrives at the Stewart store and asks Marilyn Chambers (Emily Symons) out on a date. When they return to the beach house, they are interrupted by Marilyn's jealous housemate Adam Cameron (Mat Stevenson) who spoils their date by playing Gooseberry. After Marilyn realises Adam has feelings for her she cancels her next date with Vince.
10 September – 12 October	Fred Owens	Keith Holloway	Fred owns the local boatshed which Ben (Julian McMahon) and Carly Lucini (Sharyn Hodgson) are thinking of buying. Fred initially accepts the Lucinis' offer but later tells them that Michael Ross (Dennis Coard) has offered him $10,000 more than they have and he has accepted his offer.
14 September – 17 October	Hazel Lime	Kaye Stevenson	Hazel is Geoff Lime's (William Usic) mother who disapproves of his relationship with Bobby Simpson (Nicolle Dickson) and warns Bobby off after learning she is pregnant. She later warms to Bobby and Hazel and attends a meal at Bobby's home with several relatives, where Geoff proposes to Bobby.
19 September–2 November	Alan Stone	Philip Hinton	Stone arrives in Summer Bay as Summer Bay High's new Deputy Principal. He is soon revealed to be a violent alcoholic and begins taking his frustrations out on his pupils and reintroduces caning to the school. He hits Blake Dean (Les Hill) twice on his hands. When Stone's caravan is vandalised, he instantly blames Blake but the real culprit is Steven Matheson (Adam Willits). He later suspends Blake after he vandalises his car. After arriving at Alf Stewart's (Ray Meagher) store drunk and being refused service, Stone lashes out at Blake's sister Karen. His time at Summer Bay ends when Blake defends Karen from being physically grabbed by Stone during class, resulting in Stone falling to the floor. When Donald Fisher (Norman Coburn) learns of Stone's constant singling out of the Dean siblings, he promptly transfers Stone and orders him to leave and abolishes the caning rule.
9–16 October	Daniel Atkinson	Ken Radley	Daniel is the violent alcoholic husband of Jennifer Atkinson (Kate Raison). He arrives in Summer Bay after he learns of his wife's relationship with 17-year-old Steven Matheson (Adam Willits). Daniel sneaks up on Steven and ambushes him with a cricket bat. He then turns to Alan Stone (Philip Hinton) for an alibi. Stone refuses but Daniel threatens to get him sacked from his position at the school. Stone reluctantly complies. Ben Lucini (Julian McMahon) angrily confronts Daniel after realising he attacked Steven and they fight after Daniel denies the attack. Ben's wife Carly (Sharyn Hogdson) and friend Grant Mitchell (Craig McLachlan) arrive in time to break up the fight. Daniel threatens to press charges against Ben but Carly and Grant deny seeing anything. Daniel is later charged with assaulting Steven.
14 November	Eddie	Peter Williams	Eddie is Kim Mitchell's drug dealer. He sells her some speed pills after she forges a cheque from her brother Grant (Craig McLachlan) but he is scared off by Steven Matheson (Adam Willits) who warns Kim about him.
19 November 1990 – 8 March 1991	Patricia Coleman	Pam Western	Patricia is a former nun who takes a teaching position at Summer Bay High and helps Blake Dean (Les Hill) over the guilt of his mother Margot's death. Patricia also reaches out to Sally Fletcher (Kate Ritchie) when her adoptive mother, Pippa (Debra Lawrence) begins a relationship with Michael Ross (Dennis Coard). She also strikes up a close friendship with Donald Fisher (Norman Coburn). During a swimming lesson, Patricia is stung by a bluebottle goldfish and Blake comes to her aid. She and Donald admit they like each other as more than friends but then her teaching position is terminated by the Department. Patricia and colleague Grant Mitchell (Craig McLachlan) find new jobs but they are in faraway Timboon.
