= Matt Wilson (Home and Away) =

- Home and Away character
- Portrayed by: Greg Benson
- Duration: 1988–1991, 2002
- First appearance: 17 January 1988
- Last appearance: 29 May 2002
- Introduced by: Alan Bateman (1988); Julie McGauran (2002)
- Book appearances: The Matt Wilson Story
In-universe information
- Occupation: Student at Summer Bay High; Waiter; Lifeguard
- Father: Gary Wilson
- Brothers: Shane Wilson
- Wife: Tracey Wilson
- Uncles: Rex Wilson

Matthew "Matt" Wilson is a fictional character in the Australian soap opera Home and Away, portrayed by Greg Benson. He debuted on-screen during the pilot episode airing on 17 January 1988. He was introduced as a recurring character and was later promoted to a series regular. He left the series in 1991 and returned for a guest appearance in 2002.

== Casting ==
On 10 January 1988, one week before Home and Away debuted, The Sun-Herald announced that model and actor Benson would be starring in the series. Benson auditioned for a small part in the serial's pilot episode. He went on to play an extra and was credited as "Surfer". However, producers decided to sign Benson to appear in the series on an episodic basis as Matt. Benson was later employed as a "fully fledged" regular cast member. Benson used to appear as a model in advertisements; he credited this as the reason he managed to secure his role in the serial.

In 1990, Benson and co-star Craig Thomson who plays Martin Dibble travelled to the UK in an attempt to secure a record deal. However, Benson later said that he wanted to remain in the serial "for a while" but would not rule out the possibility of a career in music. By 1991, he was one of only seven original cast members still appearing in Home and Away.

== Character development ==
Matt Wilson is a happy-go-lucky young man of nineteen. He grew up in Summer Bay and now divides his time between chasing girls and chasing waves. Matt is an enthusiastic surfer and has managed to combine his love for the sea with his job as the local beach inspector.

— Kesta Desmond on Matt.

Matt initially moved to the city to live with his parents. They had previously moved there after living all their lives in Summer Bay. Matt is described as having a dislike for city life, so he soon moved back to the town. Matt also tried to work in the Bayside Diner, but his love of the sea meant that he could not stick with it. In the Home and Away Annual, Kesta Desmond said that Matt is the serial's "hunky beach boy" who wears a permanent tan. Matt is also "most at home" when he is on a surf board. Matt is a confident character, Benson said that Matt is "well sure of himself". As Matt is a keen surfer, the role worked well for Benson who grew up on the coast and learned to surf.

Producers chose what Matt's attire would consist of; including socks and a wrist watch. Benson told a writer from Look-in that he was often "too lazy" to change his socks because he did not think the audience would notice. He also had a similar attitude towards Matt's watch because it was "always stuck on 9:30" and visible to viewers; preferring his own as it was in working order. His actions resulted in him getting into trouble with the producers, who insisted he should wear his character's clothing.

Matt went on to be one of the serial's "major pulling powers" because of the "hunk" categorisation the producers were determined to keep the character in the series as long as possible. The thought of being Home and Away's "sex symbol" made Benson cringe because he decided that the label was more associated with Hollywood actors. Benson lived about an hours away by car from the Home and Away studios. He said he chose to drive to work instead of taking the quickest travel option of a train to avoid the many female fans of Matt. Benson said "It's quite embarrassing when you're not used to it". After the producers renewed Benson's contract he admitted that he wanted to see Matt to have more character development.

Matt is later paired with fellow character Adam Cameron (Mat Stevenson), who fills the role of his best friend. Kesta Desmond wrote in the serial's authorised annual that despite the fact they are good friends, "their personalities are quite different". Adam is characterised as "a bit of a layabout", while Matt has "a very responsible attitude to finance and work matters, always turning up for work on time and paying his rent when it is due." Stevenson told a writer from Look-in that he and Benson were best friends and would also "joke around" on set. During filming, Stevenson handed Benson a cup of coffee with a cockroach in it and ruined the scene when Benson could not stop laughing.

In August 1991, David Brown of TV Week reported that Benson was leaving the serial and would film his final scenes on 27 September. Benson said he had been thinking about leaving the show for "quite sometime" and he already booked a couple of auditions. He told Brown: "I know it's the right thing to do. It's been an incredible three years – the best time. The sad thing will be losing contact with the cast and crew. On the other hand, during the three years I lost friends outside Home and Away." Brown reported that scriptwriters were working on Matt's exit storyline, but Benson confirmed that it would not be "too drastic." He reckoned that Matt would just get on a bus and the leave the Bay for the city.

An urban legend among fans claimed that Matt disappeared from the series after walking into a cupboard, when in fact his last scene has him examining the damage to his car after it has rolled back into a stationary vehicle. With no explanation offered, even Lynne McGranger who plays Irene Roberts in the serial said it was one of Home and Away's mysteries. In 2008, she told TV Week that she wonders "where Greg Benson got to, his character Matt went into the kitchen to make a burger and was never seen again."

== Storylines ==
Matt is first seen when Carly Morris (Sharyn Hodgson), Lynn Davenport (Helena Bozich) and Sally Keating (Kate Ritchie) are exploring Summer Bay, with Carly in particular being immediately taken by him. In order to get his attention, Carly follows Bobby Simpson's (Nicolle Dickson) advice and pretends to drown, only to nearly end up drowning for real. Matt is in Carly's year at school and it is partly because she is trying to impress him that Carly feels embarrassed that her foster father Tom Fletcher (Roger Oakley) is working with the road gang, unaware Matt's father is a garbage collector. Matt and Carly are cast as the leads in the school play, an experience that Carly, who had been raped not long before, finds uncomfortable. Matt has to leave Summer Bay when his family move away but he returns a few months later to take Carly to the school formal. The pair move to the city together but a few weeks later Matt returns to town and tells Carly's foster brother Steven Matheson (Adam Willits) that Carly has moved out of their flat and is hanging around with a bad crowd and drinking.

Matt tries to support Carly when she tries to kick her alcohol addiction but no longer has feelings for her. He hangs around with Roo Stewart (Justine Clarke) to avoid her and then dates former school bad girl Alison Patterson (Kathryn Ridley), even though he does not like her. When Alison reveals to a journalist that Morag Bellingham (Cornelia Frances) is Bobby's mother, Matt breaks up with her to show her what it is like to be treated badly. He dates Carly again, thinking her family are going to move to London and the relationship will end naturally, but when she offers to stay in the Bay with him, he decides end their relationship. Matt takes a job working for Bobby and Ailsa Stewart (Judy Nunn) at the new Diner. When Celia Stewart (Fiona Spence) tries to set up a counselling service in the back room, Matt joins Steven and Brian 'Dodge' Forbes (Kelly Dingwall) in playing tricks on her by pretending he is in love with an older woman and describing Celia herself. He later applies for a job as a life saver and finds himself in competition with Adam. There is initially some ill-feeling when Matt secures the job but he and Adam sort it out and end up sharing a flat.

Some years earlier, Matt's elder brother Shane had been shot and killed. Al Simpson (Terence Donovan), Bobby's adopted father, returns to town and tries to blackmail Donald Fisher (Norman Coburn), who believes he accidentally shot Shane while hunting and has kept quiet ever since. Instead Donald turns himself in, at which point he discovers his gun was not the one that killed Shane. Matt and Bobby manage to expose Al as the real murderer.

Matt and Adam begin renting the beach house and invite Marilyn Chambers (Emily Symons) to move in with them. Matt's stay at the house is beset by problems, including crooked landlord Ernie Jacobs (David Weatherley) repeatedly trying to evict them and Adam and Marilyn's on-off romance, which sees them asking Matt to decide which of them would have to move out. When a botched DIY job by Adam leaves Matt trapped in the bathroom for hours, he moves into Grant Mitchell's (Craig McLachlan) flat. Matt and Adam play a joke on Blake Dean (Les Hill) when he asks to join the surf club by setting him up with a punishing training regime that leaves him exhausted. Grant decides to tell Blake the truth. Matt and Steven are later responsible for working out that Grant's sister Kim (Rachael Beck) is a drug addict.

When Adam tries to arrange for some of his friends to go on a surfing trip, Josh Webb (Erick Mitsak) plans to use the trip to get Adam and Blake alone, so lets the handbrake off Matt's car, causing it to damage another vehicle and leaving Matt, whose insurance had expired, having to pay for the damage to both cars and unable to afford the trip.

Matt is not seen again for eleven years when he returns for Summer Bay's sesquicentenary celebrations, where it is revealed that he married a woman called Tracey. However, even though they are both now married to other people, he is Carly's date for the celebratory boat cruise. When the boat capsizes, they are quickly rescued and Matt joins the hunt for the missing passengers and crew. He is part of the team that finds Sally, Blake and Sophie Simpson (Rebekah Elmaloglou), but has to return home before the search is completed.

== In other media ==
Matt was the subject in The Matt Wilson Story, one of a series of tie-in novels published in 1989 chronicling the characters' lives prior to the series.

== Reception ==
Clive Hopwood in the book Home and Away Special said that Matt was "the local lifeguard and ace surfer" who had good looks that were "enough to make any female volunteer want to be rescued and given the kiss of life, preferably several times." Hopwood also said that Benson's portrayal of Matt was natural. He said it was no surprise he took to the role "like a duck, or rather a lifeguard, to water".

Off-screen Benson was in a relationship with Amanda Newman-Phillips who played Narelle Smart. The character of Matt was very popular with female viewers due to his appearance. Newman-Phillips said that she tried to hide their relationship; to avoid "breaking the hearts" of Matt's fans.

== Bibliography ==
- Desmond, Kesta (1990). Home and Away Annual. Grandreams Ltd. ISBN 0-86227-787-6.
- Desmond, Kesta; Nicholls, David (1992). Home and Away Annual Authorised Edition. Grandreams Ltd. ISBN 0-86227-863-5.
- Hopwood, Clive (1990). Home and Away Special. World International Publishing LTD. ISBN 0-7235-6899-5.
- J Clayden, Melanie (1989). Home and Away Annual. Grandreams Ltd. ISBN 0-86227-687-X.
- Oram, James (1989). Home and away: behind the scenes. Angus & Robertson. ISBN 0-207-16315-4.
