= Ben Lucini =

- Home and Away character
- Portrayed by: Julian McMahon
- Duration: 1990–1991
- First appearance: 27 February 1990
- Last appearance: 1 May 1991
- Introduced by: Des Monaghan
In-universe information
- Other names: Benito Lucini
- Occupation: Army corporal
- Father: Antonio Lucini
- Mother: Gina Lucini
- Sisters: Francesca Lucini
- Wife: Carly Morris (1990–)
- Sons: Jordy Lucini; Michael Lucini
- Daughters: Philippa Lucini
- First cousins: Angelo

Benito "Ben" Lucini is a fictional character from the Australian television soap opera Home and Away, played by Julian McMahon. The character made his first screen appearance on 27 February 1990. McMahon wanted to appear in another prime-time soap opera having previously appeared in The Power, The Passion and had to audition for the role of Ben four times. Ben was introduced as a new love interest of established character Carly Morris (Sharyn Hodgson). The show's producer, Andrew Howie, had already planned their wedding before Ben had debuted on-screen.

Ben is portrayed as a soldier and characterised as an honest and easy-going man. Ben is an Italian character and writers explored his backstory through his friendship with Dave Porter (John Adam). Producers made Ben and Carly's relationship one of the show's centric stories and focused on their pursuit of happiness as they married and moved into their first home. Ben made his final appearance during the episode broadcast on 1 May 1991. His departure story featured Ben rejoining the army and Carly moving to Perth to live closer to him.

== Casting ==
McMahon had to audition four times before the producers agreed that he was suitable for the role of Ben. After he received the role, McMahon had a couple of days to relocate from Melbourne to Sydney and get into character. In December 1989, McMahon's casting and the character details were announced via David Brown from TV Week. Brown revealed that McMahon had begun filming that month and his debut episodes would air in February 1990. The show's producer Andrew Howie revealed that McMahon was "thrilled with the role" and was "keen to establish himself in a primetime show." Howie opined that McMahon had been "extremely green" and unexperienced in his first acting role in the soap opera The Power, The Passion; but was sure that McMahon would develop better skills on his show.

== Development ==
=== Characterisation and introduction ===
McMahon told Barry Divola from Stars of Oz that Ben is characterised as a "lovely guy, he's very honest, very open." In the 1992 Home and Away Annual, Kesta Desmond and David Nicholls described Ben as being "relaxed" and "easy-going" for a twenty-one-year-old male. Ben is an Italian character and comes from a large family. Ben's lifelong friend was Dave Porter (John Adam) and he helped Ben through school as he suffered racist taunts because of his ethnicity. He used to have a liking for partying and booze, but as he grew older he matured and changed his outlook in life. In his backstory, the character was only moderately successful academically, preferring to participate in sports. Then enlisted into the army aged eighteen and was accompanied by his friend Dave. Ben's skillset saw him quickly promoted to an army corporal, whereas Dave was happy to remain a lower rank. In his book, The who's who of soap operas, Anthony Hayward described Ben and Dave as growing apart as their interests changed.

To help introduce Ben in the series, writers created friendship with fellow new character Grant Mitchell (Craig McLachlan). Howie explained that Ben and Dave's "arrival coincides with a local iron-man contest. Dave convinces his mate to take part in the competition and it develops into a head-on battle" with Grant. Ben soon falls in love with the town and leaves the army.

=== Relationship with Carly Morris ===
Writers created a romance story between Ben and established character Carly Morris (Sharyn Hodgson). Producers had invested much into making the romance a centric story, even planning their wedding before Ben had debuted on-screen. Howie told Brown that "their romance will be full-on, bigger than Ben Hur." McMahon told Divola that he and Hodgson worked hard to create the impression that their characters were in "love at first sight". Despite their instant attraction, it took a series of schemes created by Ben's friend Grant to get them to commit to a relationship. Ben soon proposed marriage to Carly but as Hayward noted, "it was to be a long and bumpy road to the altar." McMahon explained that Ben and Carly portray "all that pre-marriage trauma stuff" such as finding their first home and worrying about paying the rent. Ben's personality is a main factor of Carly's attraction. Hodgson described Ben as having "traditional values" and "stability". Carly admires these traits and feels ready to settle down with him. Ben and Carly marry and Hodgson predicted that their marriage would be successful because they "really do want what is best for each other". McMahon wanted the pair to settle down in "bliss" after they marry. He told Divola that he wished for them become as cattle farmers because he imagined them as better suited to a rural setting. The episodes that featured the build-up to their wedding captured "a huge amount of interest" from Home and Away viewers. McMahon began being hassled in the street by fans who wanted to know the outcome of the story.

Writers created a tense scenario for Ben and Carly's wedding episode. They scripted a disaster buck's night for Ben which saw a series of pranks leave Ben stranded elsewhere jeopardising the wedding. Ahead of the wedding, Ben's family were introduced including his interfering cousin Angelo (Raj Sidhu), who agrees to be the best man. Angelo purchases a takeaway meal for Ben which gives him food poisoning. Ben takes medication to relieve his symptoms and decides to opt out of a traditional bucks night in favour of drinking some beer. The alcohol mixes with his medication and puts Ben into a deep sleep. Angelo and Adam Cameron (Mat Stevenson) kidnap Ben, leave him stranded in the bush. A truck driver finds Ben and offers him a lift home. Ben is still confused and mistakenly tells the driver he still lives in Perth agrees to take him. Discussing Angelo's prank, McMahon told Glen Williams from TV Week that "Angelo never thinks of the consequences and is not your most likeable character."

When Carly arrives at the church and Ben does not show, she incorrectly believes that he has jilted her. Hodgson told Williams that "there is nothing for Carly to do but go home and grieve about what might haver been." When Ben regains his awareness hours later but manages to get back to Summer Bay. Ben manages to convince Carly to still go ahead with the wedding. Ben replaces Angelo's best man position with Grant. Hodgson added "it's all a bit rushed, but it's a fairytale wedding [...] The bride in a traditional gown and veil, the scene is very pretty. Ben and Grant look very handsome in their dinner suits. It really is a beautiful wedding, all very traditional." In the United Kingdom, more than twelve million viewers watched Ben and Carly's wedding episode when it was broadcast on ITV. Writers often portrayed the pair as an argumentative couple. Desmond described Ben was normally written as an "honest, easy-going bloke" but those traits were lost once arguments ensued with Carly.

McMahon decided to leave Home and Away during his first year in the series. In the 1 September 1990 edition of TV Week, David Brown publicised McMahon's departure and revealed that Hodgson was also leaving. McMahon's contract expired in December 1990 and Hodgson's in March 1991. Brown added that producers were asking McMahon to stay until Hodgson's departure so that Ben and Carly's exit stories coincided with each other. In his final story, Ben revealed he was AWOL from the army rather than being discharged. Despite the shock, the pair reconcile before they leave. At the time of his departure, McMahon appeared in 145 episodes of Home and Away.

== Storylines ==
Ben arrives in Summer Bay on military leave and is accompanied by his friend Dave. Ben soon begins dating Carly but she grows annoyed with Dave and breaks up with Ben. Grant Mitchell helps Carly and Ben reconcile by pretending to date Carly. In return he pretends Ben has been injured to force Carly to admit her concern. Ben proposes marriage to Carly and she accepts but her foster parents Tom (Roger Oakley) and Pippa Fletcher (Vanessa Downing) accuse the pair of being too hasty. The couple set about finding additional jobs and looking at potential homes. When Tom dies of a heart attack, Ben comforts Carly and inadvertently upsets Steven Matheson (Adam Willits) when he sits at the head of the table, in Tom's place.

Ben and Carly's relationship is marred by financial worry regarding their wedding. Ben and Carly go skinny-dipping but their car and clothes are stolen. The police arrest Ben for public indecency, but they do not press charges. Ben tries to help Pippa set up a chicken farm but his efforts are in vain as he cannot handle the birds and gives them up. Ben's family arrive ahead of the wedding but gets food poisoning after his cousin Angelo buys him a takeaway meal. Doctor Walker (Earl Cross) gives Ben medication but warns him not to mix it with alcohol. Ignoring the warning, Angelo and Adam get Ben drunk, steal his trousers and leave him in the bush. Ben is then picked up by the truck driver who takes him miles out on the road. Ben is lost on the morning of his wedding and Carly is left waiting at the church and presumes Ben has decided not to marry her. Ben manages to get home and their wedding takes place later that day and they move in together.

Ben learns that Fred Owens (Keith Holloway) is selling his boatshed business and secures a bank loan to purchase it. Ben is shocked to discover that Michael Ross (Dennis Coard) has already purchased the business. The pair begin a feud, which is later ended when Ben agrees to work in the boatshed for Michael. He later decides he wants to be a farmer, which is also unsuccessful and he secretly enrols into the army. Carly is shocked by Ben's deception and they nearly break-up. She discovers that she is pregnant but leaves for service anyway. He later arrives to attend Pippa and Michael's wedding and it transpires that he has gone AWOL. Military policemen arrive to arrest Ben, but Alf Stewart (Ray Meagher) manages to convince them to give him time to save his marriage. Carly decides to accept Ben's career and they relocate to Perth. Carly returns in 2000 for Sally Fletcher's (Kate Ritchie) wedding. She confirms that she and Ben are still married with children, but she does not see Ben much due to his travelling commitments.

== Reception ==
Peter Holmes of The Sydney Morning Herald was critical of McMahon's acting in the role, calling him "wooden" and saying he did "a splendid impression of a Thunderbird". Barry Divola from Stars of Oz said that McMahon had "taken the show to new heights" in Australia. He added that Ben was the show's "hot new addition" and a "tall, dark handsome" character. Catriona Watson from Closer opined that Ben and Carly had a "difficult marriage". A reporter from TV Week stated that Ben's bucks night filled with pranks was one of the best featured in a soap opera. Another TV Week writer branded Ben and Carly a "fiery couple" and included the duo in their "greatest couples of all time" feature. Nathan Jolly from News.com.au criticised the character writing "army corporal Ben Lucini, a character so devoid of ... well, character, that the official description of Ben calls him 'easygoing for a twenty-one-year-old male.' Meaty role!" Donna Hay from What's on TV included Ben and Carly in their soap opera "marriages made in heaven" list. A writer from Inside Soap branded Ben an "Italian stallion" and believed Ben and Carly had an "instant attraction". They assessed that Ben also "became the man of the house" following Tom's death.
