= Emma Jackson (Home and Away) =

Character from the Australian soap opera Home and Away

- Home and Away character
- Portrayed by: Dannii Minogue
- Duration: 1989–1990
- First appearance: 22 September 1989
- Last appearance: 22 August 1990
- Introduced by: Des Monaghan
In-universe information
- Occupation: Student; Waitress; Flight attendant
- Mother: Bridget Jackson
- Stepfather: Barry Jackson
- Brothers: Troy Jackson; Justin Jackson
- Grandfathers: Harold O'Rourke
- Uncles: Tony O'Rourke
- Aunts: Ailsa Stewart
- First cousins: Shauna Bradley; Duncan Stewart

Emma Jackson is a fictional character from the Australian soap opera Home and Away, played by Dannii Minogue. She made her first appearance during the episode broadcast on 22 September 1989. She departed on 22 August 1990. Emma was described as a teen punk and a tomboy.

== Development ==
=== Creation and casting ===
In 1989, Young Talent Time actress Dannii Minogue was offered an audition for Home and Away. Following her return from New York City, where she was recording her first album, Minogue read for the role of Marilyn Chambers. She believed she was not right for the character and she did not win the role. However, the producers asked Minogue's manager Terry Blamey if they could write a part especially for her and they came up with Emma Jackson. Minogue wanted to accept the role, as she loved the character's personality, but she was in the middle of recording her album and was nervous about relocating to Sydney for filming. Blamey decided that she should have a short run on the show and negotiated a thirteen-week contract, with an option to extend once her album was finished. Minogue's casting was publicised in May 1989. Home and Away producer Andrew Howie revealed that Emma would be introduced as a relative of an established character and branded her a "prominent and up-front" person. Minogue was 17 when she started filming in July 1989. Chrissie Camp of TV Week reported how Minogue was "thrilled" with the role, but she was disappointed about having to move to Sydney and be away from her parents. Minogue stated: "Emma is a real rebel so she'll be a great character to play. This is only the second real acting job I've done, so I think it will be a good series to get into, particularly because it's going so well in the UK, too."

=== Characterisation and relationships ===
The character was billed as "a rebellious, aggressive teenager who instantly clashes with the adults and upsets Bobby (Nicolle Dickson)." Emma was also described as a punk and a "spunky tomboy". In a May 2000 interview with Ellie Genower from Soaplife, Minogue recalled "Emma was a real shocker, a very mixed-up girl who got everyone's back up. But it was only because of the awful things that had happened to her." In 2009, Minogue recalled that "In the beginning, Emma was really arrogant and punk and in every scene she would slam the door when she walked in or out." She added that one day during filming, she slammed a door and all the items on the wall fell off, leaving her embarrassed.

Camp (TV Week) described the character's fictional backstory as "a hard-hitting storyline", as Emma is abused by her father and thrown out of the house by her mother, who does not believe her. Minogue said Emma had "a rough life" which led her to get into trouble. Emma is later placed in a remand centre and because she cannot return home, she goes to live with her aunt Ailsa Stewart (Judy Nunn) in Summer Bay. Minogue explained that Ailsa takes pity on Emma and takes her in because she sees similarities between her own experiences and Emma's. In her first few episodes, Emma is seen clashing with Bobby Simpson (Nicolle Dickson). Camp noted the similarities between the two characters and reported that producers hoped Emma would be just as popular with viewers. Camp also wondered if Emma would remain a rebel or eventually show that she has a heart of gold. Minogue did not do much research into the abuse issue because of the good script quality. She told Genower that "I understood exactly how Emma felt [...] the scripts were written so well that they told me all I needed to know."

Camp reported that Emma would have "a major romance", but the network was keeping the details of her love interest a secret. Emma was later paired with Adam Cameron (Mat Stevenson) for a romance storyline. Upon their introduction into Home and Away, writers portrayed a clear attraction between the two characters but nothing substantial occurred. A romance story between Adam and Carly Morris (Sharyn Hodgson) was scripted and played out in episodes that followed. Writers soon revisited the attraction between Emma and Adam, once his former relationship ended. Stevenson told David Brown from TV Week that "nothing eventuated until Adam began a relationship with Carly. They went through a rough patch and Adam and Emma came together. She decides she's keen on him and goes about wooing him." Stevenson added that a more significant romance for Adam was a "good angle" to play.

=== Departure ===
Minogue stayed with the show for a year, before she quit to launch her music career in 1990. Minogue filmed her final scenes as Emma in June 1990. Minogue did not want to do both acting and singing simultaneously. She later recalled that "it was a great experience" and "being in Home and Away was terrific and I learned a lot but I've never thought of myself as an actress."

In October 2007, it was rumoured that Minogue was due to reprise her role as Emma for the show's 20th anniversary in 2008. However, she did not appear. In 2018, Minogue stated that she would love to return for a short stint as part of the show's 30th anniversary celebrations. She also said she had been contacted by the producers, but added "If I did it, I'd want it to be short and sharp, in and out, because those schedules are huge."

== Storylines ==
Emma comes to live with her aunt Ailsa Stewart after attacking her stepfather, Barry. She immediately clashes with Ailsa's husband Alf Stewart (Ray Meagher). Emma attempts to buy alcohol from the local store but Alf's sister Celia Stewart (Fiona Spence) refuses her the sale as she is underage, which causes Emma to insult Celia. Emma tells Ailsa she thought she would be more fun because she had been in jail and that was why she asked to stay with her. Ailsa refused to admit what she had been jailed for but reminds Emma that the experience was unpleasant. They both agree to stay out of each other's way.

Ailsa gives Emma a job at the Bayside Diner but she constantly winds up Ailsa's business partner Bobby Simpson. Emma proves to be a lazy employee and is threatened by Bobby with the sack. She continues her feud with Celia and does little to impress principal Donald Fisher (Norman Coburn) with her attitude. Adam invites Emma out on a date but when he tries to get close to her, she feels uncomfortable. Adam tells Emma he only went out with her for a bet, anyway. Upset, Emma takes revenge and drills holes in his raft causing it to sink in a race the next day. Emma confides in Carly that Barry abused her after her real father died when she was eight.

She takes Viv Newton (Mouche Phillips) under her wing, dragging her into trouble which does not sit well with Viv's guardian, Donald, who bans Emma from seeing Viv. Emma is fired from the diner and begins attending Summer Bay High, where she organises a student rebellion against the uniform. The plan fails when Donald turns up in punk clothing himself. Emma then encourages Viv to skip school and accept a ride from two guys who drive them out to a deserted forest. The guys soon turn on the girls and nearly rape them; luckily Steven Matheson (Adam Willits) and Alf rescue them. Emma is grateful to Steven and is attracted to him but he clearly prefers Viv. She then passes her driving test and lets Viv drive Alf's car but Viv crashes into a car belonging to Maurice "Revhead" Gibson (Gavin Harrison) and his friend "Skid" (Chris Harding). They demand payment otherwise they will tell Alf about the crash. Bobby helps the girls stall Revhead and Skid while Lance Smart (Peter Vroom) and Martin Dibble (Craig Thomson) fix the car and they avoid payment.

Emma begins a relationship with Adam but she has a momentary attraction to Grant Mitchell (Craig McLachlan) and asks him out. Grant rejects Emma as he will be starting as her new teacher. Vicki Baxter (Nana Coburn), Emma's nemesis, herself has a crush on Grant and when he rejects her, she invents a story in which Grant sexually assaulted her resulting in his suspension. Emma applies pressure to get Vicki to change her story but every attempt backfires. Vicki does eventually confess and Grant is off the hook.

Bridget (Paula Duncan), Emma's mother, arrives and she is not pleased to see her and tells her to stay away. However, Bridget convinces her she has kicked Barry out and they begin rebuilding their relationship. Ailsa and Bridget constantly fight over Emma's welfare. Emma agrees to go back to Riverstone with her mother and bids Ailsa an emotional farewell. Several weeks later, she returns in a bad mood and is constantly rude. Emma reveals Bridget has not changed. She breaks up with Adam and begins seeing Paul Jensen (Craig Black), who writes her a song. She encounters more problems with Vicki, who steals an exam paper and frames Emma for it, getting her expelled from school. Emma is forced to attend Yabbie Creek High. She is upset when Alf and Ailsa do not believe her and is even more distraught when Paul begins hanging out with Vicki. It emerges that Paul is only seeing Vicki as part of a plan to clear Emma's name. The truth is revealed after Vicki's cousin Anna (Rebecca George) arrives at the school and tells Donald all. Vicki is expelled and Emma is reinstated but she refuses to return to school. Donald, Alf and Ailsa apologise. Shortly after Emma ends things with Paul and takes a job on the Gold Coast and leaves to become an air hostess.

== Reception ==
For her portrayal of Emma, Minogue received a nomination for the Logie Award for Most Popular Actress in 1989. Holy Soap named Minogue as one of Home and Away's "Sexiest girls ever". Despite only being on-screen for a couple of months, David Brown from TV Week opined "as the rebellious Emma Jackson, Dannii is already one of Home and Away's most popular characters with Australian viewers." Sopalife's Ellie Genower stated that viewers "were in for a shock" if they were expecting Mingoue's character to be like the "girl-next-door" character Charlene Robinson from the rival soap opera, Neighbours, played by Minogue's sister Kylie Minogue. Genower profiled Emma's appearance upon her arrival as a "full-on punk, dressed in leather with jet black hair and heavy make-up."

In November 2021, three critics for The West Australian placed Emma at number 37 in their feature on the "Top 50 heroes we love and villains we hate" from Home and Away. Of the character, they wrote: "The hair, the pout, the leather jacket and the devil-may-care attitude — it was clear from the moment Dannii Minogue set foot in Summer Bay that she'd left Young Talent Time far, far behind her. Emma came to live with her aunt Ailsa Stewart (Judy Nunn) after attacking her stepfather, Barry. She clashed with the curmudgeonly Alf from the beginning."
