= Blake Dean (Home and Away) =

- Home and Away character
- Portrayed by: Les Hill
- Duration: 1990–1993, 2002–2003, 2005
- First appearance: 26 July 1990
- Last appearance: 8 July 2005
- Introduced by: Des Monaghan (1990); Julie McGuaran (2002–2005)
In-universe information
- Occupation: Student at Summer Bay High (1990–1992); Barman
- Father: Les Bagley
- Mother: Margot Dean
- Sisters: Karen Dean
- Half-sisters: Roxanne Miller
- Wife: Sophie Simpson (2005–)
- Sons: David Simpson
- Stepdaughters: Tamara Simpson
- Uncles: Kevin Bagley; Alec Dean

Blake Dean is a fictional character from the Australian Channel Seven soap opera Home and Away, played by Les Hill. Blake debuted on screen during the episode broadcast on 26 July 1990.

== Casting ==
Hill was sixteen and still in school when he was cast as Blake. He had been acting "rowdy" and not attending and felt it was the right time to leave his education behind and join the cast of Home and Away. The character was Hill's first television role. In 1992, Hill said that he enjoyed working on the serial because he had the chance to learn from other actors, especially Ray Meagher who plays Alf Stewart. By which time, Hill had become one of the serial's "biggest stars" and was even earning two thousand dollars from personal appearances. Hill was also being considered for a role in Baywatch, but had to turn it down due to his filming commitments with Home and Away. While interviewed by a reporter from TV Week, Hill criticised the show and then announced that he had quit. In 2002, Hill returned to filming as part of a special fourteenth anniversary storyline. Hill returned once again in 2005, this time as part of the serial's 4000th episode.

== Character development ==
In the book Home and Away Annual, Kesta Desmond and David Nicholls describe Blake as being "the sort of boy any parent would be proud to call their son". He is "good looking and high spirited" and "loves life" so much that he lives it to the full. Blake also has a "high regard" for the friendships that he forms. They added that Blake is not exactly a "goody two shoes" and "gets up to various jinks" during his time in the series. Blake can get away with his antics because he is a quick thinker and his "natural charm saves his skin". Blake thinks that girls can be silly and clingy, but just enjoys their company. Blake is also the sporty type of guy. Hill told Rochelle Tubb of The Sun-Herald that he struggled during some of Blake's running scenes because he was not that fit in real life. Hill said that there was "no denying" that Blake is a rebel. He is overprotective of Karen and feels guilty because his mother died at the same time he started getting into trouble at school. Hill told Nigel May from Look-in that Blake will always be over protective of Karen. If the actor had his way, Blake would be "an absolute hoodlum". Hill said there were certain things he would change about Blake. He did not like his character's name and he wanted Blake to do something hard and challenging.

In the TV Week issue dated 29 December 1990, a reporter revealed that writers had planned a love triangle storyline for Blake, his friend Haydn Ross (Andrew Hill) and Sophie Simpson (Rebekah Elmaloglou). They previewed that Blake would become "embroiled" in the story in early 1991 episodes.

"If I was my character, I think I would have killed myself by now! His mother died of cancer, his first girlfriend left him for his best friend, his sister's gone off to jail, his second girlfriend left him and his third girlfriend dies from leukemia."

— Hill on Blake's many troubles.

Series producer Andrew Howie told TV Week that Blake would enter a relationship with a new character, Meg Bowman (Cathy Godbold), who would have a "major problem". Howie added that "this will be the strongest and most relevant story we have done". Meg arrives alongside her "protective mother" Julia Bowman (Debra Byrne) for a ten-week guest stint. Meg and Blake start a relationship, however she is suffering from leukemia and attempts to keep it a secret. Meg spends the last weeks of her life with Blake and after her death, Blake cannot let go and imagines that Meg is still with him. The Seven Network decided to move Home and Away into the same time-slot as rival soap opera Neighbours. Godbold told a reporter from Inside Soap that producers devised the "love story that ended in tragedy" to secure better ratings than Neighbours. Their romance proved popular with viewers and forced their opposition to change their time-slot. Producers also told Godbold that they wished they could have kept her in the series.

While interviewed by Sarah Greene on Going Live!, Hill said that the storyline was "emotionally hectic" during filming because they did not film in sequence. While filming Meg's death scenes he thought about sad things to build himself up emotionally. Hill opined that the storyline was believable and well written; which made it easier to get into character. Hill also revealed that he did not speak to anyone with leukemia during the research stage. Hill said that he went with what he thought was right at the time. The storyline highlighted the issue of the illness, with many leukemia patients praising the series. Godbold said that she had actual chemistry with Hill and admitted that there was an attraction. She added that there had to be actual chemistry for the pair to portray such convincing scenes. Godbold's boyfriend became jealous of their on-screen chemistry and ended his relationship with her.

Blake later begins a relationship with Finlay Roberts (Tina Thomsen). Finlay believes that she has found love with Blake and cannot wait to make their relationship official. When the pair share a kiss, Blake's memories of Meg return and he realises he still loves her. Blake is eventually forced to tell Finlay the truth and the break-up. Blake later changes his mind and the pair go scuba diving. However, Finlay nearly drowns and ends up in hospital. This leads to "tense scenes" with Finlay's mother Irene Roberts (Lynne McGranger). Blake then declares his love for Finlay, but many other characters think that he is still not over Meg.

When Blake returns in 2002, he arrives in town sporting a flashy car and he feels an attraction to his ex-girlfriend Sophie.

== Storylines ==
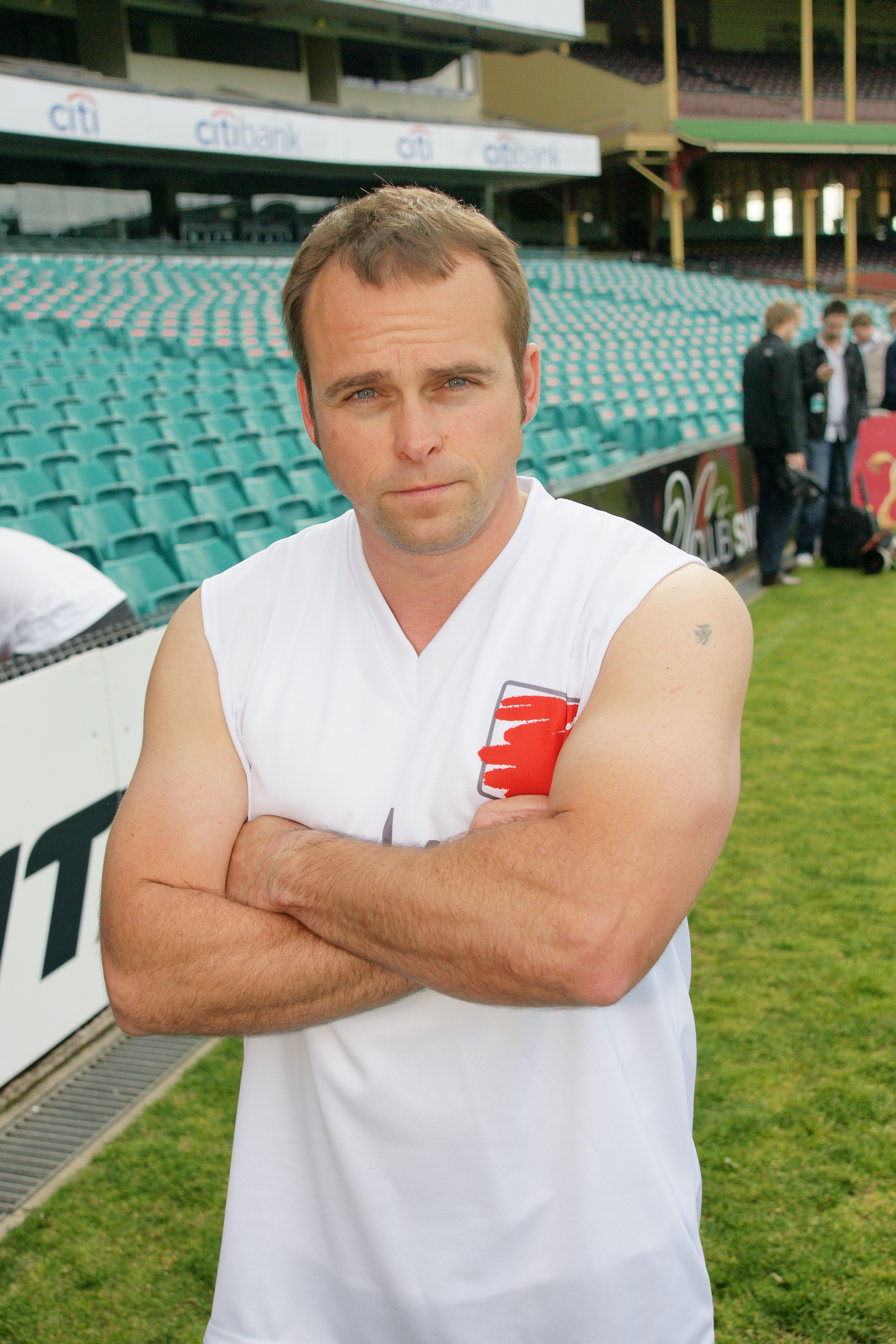
Les Hill plays Blake.

Blake arrives in Summer Bay with his younger sister Karen (Belinda Jarrett), looking for Ailsa Stewart (Judy Nunn), who had been in prison with their mother, Margot, who has recently died. They hope Ailsa will take them in after living with their uncle Alec (Norm Galton) proved to be unpleasant. Ailsa's husband Alf is less than enthusiastic but she eventually talks him round. While playing a game of street cricket with Karen, Sophie and Sally Fletcher (Kate Ritchie), he damages principal Donald Fisher's (Norman Coburn) car with a stray ball and is annoyed when Alf and Donald insist he pay for the repairs even though it is an accident. Blake changes his mind and Alf agrees to pay half the costs. Blake, Karen and Sophie try to earn the money by doing some gardening for Donald but accidentally leave a sprinkler running by an open window, resulting in the front room being soaked. Early into his time at Summer Bay High, Blake clashes with another of his teachers, Grant Mitchell (Craig McLachlan), but changes his mind when Grant offers to train him for an upcoming iron man competition after he is the victim of a practical joke from Adam Cameron (Mat Stevenson) and Matt Wilson (Greg Benson) who encourage him to train harder than he needs to.

When Alan Stone (Philip Hinton) takes over as deputy principal, Blake clashes with him. Blake and Karen point out one of Stone's mistakes and he begins a campaign against them. Stone exceeds his authority and canes Blake across his hands in front of his peers. The class are shocked but caning is legal, although the incident prompts Donald to stipulate it is not to be used at Summer Bay High anymore. Blake exacts revenge by taking the wheels of Stone's car and raising it on bricks, which causes his car to be damaged as well as Donald's. The final straw comes when Stone grabs Karen in class and Blake steps in to defend his sister and pushes Stone away from her, causing him to fall. Stone complains to Donald but is transferred. Blake begins beating himself up emotionally and his mood swings worry Alf, Ailsa and Grant. He confesses that he blames himself for his mother's death from cancer and feels the stress of his time in juvenile detention for car theft caused the cancer. Ailsa and Steven Matheson (Adam Willits) assure Blake that he is not to blame for his mother's death. Patricia Coleman (Pam Western), Blake's new teacher and a former nun, also counsels him.

Blake and Sophie begin dating, their first date is ruined when they have to look after Sally and they are later caught kissing on a school trip. While Blake is on detention, Sophie and Haydn take the lead roles in the school's production of Romeo and Juliet. Blake does not like Haydn and is annoyed when he catches Sophie kissing him for real. Blake punches Haydn, ending his relationship with Sophie. Sophie and Karen force Blake and Haydn to bond and they later buy a car from school caretaker Kenny Gibbs (David Field): The car has numerous faults but they restore it together. Blake tries to forget about Sophie by dating Rachel Webb (Beth Champion). However, when Blake reports Rachel's brother Josh (Eric Mitsak), for drug dealing, Josh seeks revenge on him. Rachel also reports Josh when he tries to frame Adam, who protected Blake from him, for robbery. She and her mother Gerry (Julie Godfrey) decide to leave Summer Bay. Josh is later released from prison and claims to be a reformed character. Blake and Adam accompany Josh on a camping trip, but they discover he is planning to murder them. They overpower Josh and he flees the area.

When Haydn leaves, Blake finds his social circle shrinking. When Karen begins dating local troublemaker Maurice "Revhead" Gibson (Gavin Harrison), Blake covers for her and is shocked when he learns they have robbed Alf's store. Karen attempts to flee the bay but kills Donald's nephew David Croft (Guy Pearce) in a car accident while doing so. Karen is then arrested and imprisoned. Blake learns Sophie is pregnant with David's baby and helps his new friend Simon Fitzgerald (Richard Norton) pose as the father in order to help her. Blake and Simon arrange to have some girls over while Alf and Ailsa are out only for their guests, Sharyn (Liza Witt) and Annette (Kylie Hogart), to set them up by leaving lingerie down the back of the sofa. Soon after Simon's father Bill (Terry Bader) is exposed as a con artist, Simon moves with Blake and the Stewarts.

Meg Bowman arrives in the bay and Blake is instantly smitten but her mother Julia tries to warn him off. It emerges Meg is dying of leukaemia and Blake continues to see her. Meg tells Blake she has three wishes to fulfill before she dies, to swim with dolphins, to ride an old-fashioned ship and to make love. Alf arranges for Blake and Meg to spend a weekend together at a hotel in the city where they consummate their relationship but Meg deteriorates rapidly on their return. A few days later Meg dies in Blake's arms on the beach as they watch the sun rise. Blake is depressed for a while and Alf arranges for him to go on an exchange trip. When he returns, Blake learns that Simon has gone back to live with Bill. Blake then begins spending time with Finlay and they share a kiss but he does not want a relationship with her and tries to let her down gently. Adam arranges a situation where Finlay catches Blake kissing another girl. Finlay takes revenge by sabotaging Blake's alarm clock, making him late for a HSC exam.

Les Bagley (John Orcsik), Blake's estranged father, re-enters his life. The Stewarts want him to stay away but Blake wants to get to know his dad and agrees to visit him. This drives a wedge between Blake and Alf and Blake leaves to live with Les. Blake later discovers he has a half-sister, Roxanne Miller (Lisa Lackey). Les is not interesting in knowing his daughter but Blake insists on tracking her down. Blake suggests Roxy take a job at Les' restaurant but Les sees through this and hits Roxy. Blake turns his back on his father and returns to the Bay, taking Roxy with him. After an icy reunion, Blake and Alf reconcile. Blake takes up scuba diving and spends more time with Finlay. When she is trapped during a dive, Blake raises the alarm and she is rescued. While Finlay is recovering in hospital, Blake shares a kiss with her and they become a couple. Karen returns to town after she is paroled but Blake learns she is still out of control and she starts a fight in a nightclub, which results in Blake being punched. When Karen flees the Bay after stealing money from Ailsa, Blake tracks her down in the city where she is staying with a criminal friend and tries to convince her to return. She refuses and Blake decides to join her in the city to keep an eye on her, which effectively ends his and Fin's romance.

Blake returns nine years later, to attend the town's 150th anniversary celebrations. When the cruise ship the Mirigini is wrecked in a storm, he, Sally and Sophie are stranded in the bush. They are eventually rescued and Blake's old feelings for Sophie come to the surface and they leave together. Blake disagrees with Sophie's plan to be a surrogate for Sally and her boyfriend Flynn Saunders (Martin Dingle-Wall; later Joel McIlroy) but when Sophie discovers she is carrying two babies, one Sally and Flynn's and the other hers and Blake's, her daughter Tamara (Sophie Luck) summons Blake to the Bay. Sophie miscarries Sally's baby, but hers and Blake's child survives. Blake and Sophie leave town together again intending to raise their child as a family. However, when Sophie and Tamara return to town a few months later for Sally and Flynn's wedding, they reveal that Blake had proposed but did not turn up at the registry office and they have not seen him since. Sophie gives birth to Blake's son without Blake being present and names him David after Tamara's father. Blake returns two years later for Alf's 60th birthday and meets Sophie again. He apologises for his behaviour and tells her that she and David are the most important people to him. She agrees to take him back.

== Reception ==
In 1993, readers of Inside Soap voted Blake as "Best Male Character" and Hill as "Best Actor" and "Sexiest Man In Soap". Jess McGuire of Defamer said that she found Sophie and Blake being intimate, more disturbing to watch than two of the serial's sapphic characters kissing. Darren Devlyn of News.com.au said that Hill "burst onto the acting scene" through Home and Away, but did not truly arrive as an actor while on the series. Michael Idato writing for The Age said that Blake was a "rebellious teen" and noted that soap operas "rarely cast against type" so he was not surprised that Hill was rebellious too. A columnist for Stuff.co.nz said that Blake was a "hunky teenager". Jenna Price of The Sydney Morning Herald said that Hill was one of the serial's teenage actors that had a "pleasant awkwardness" about their portrayal. They added that Hill became Home and Away's new poster boy and "obliterated the memory of Craig McLachlan". When Finlay became hospitalised, a columnist for Inside Soap said "surely the writers couldn't be so cruel as to kill two girlfriends in a row for Blake? Or could they?". While another columnist named Meg dying in Blake's arms as a "great moment in soap". They said that it was "the saddest day in Summer Bay" and added that the "nation wept" as Meg told Blake her dying wish.

Donna Hay from What's on TV included Blake and Meg in their "marriages made in heaven" feature. Hay noted that "if ever a romance was doomed, it was the one between" and "they knew that their days of happiness were numbered." Hay believed the pair "made the most of them, right up until the moment Meg died in his arms."
