= Carly Morris =

- Home and Away character
- Portrayed by: Sharyn Hodgson
- Duration: 1988–1991, 1997, 2000–2002, 2008
- First appearance: 17 January 1988
- Last appearance: 3 April 2008
- Introduced by: Alan Bateman (1988); John Holmes (1997); Julie McGuaran (2001); Cameron Welsh (2008)
- Book appearances: The Carly Morris Story; Dangerous Ride; Carly's Crisis
In-universe information
- Occupation: Student; Waitress
- Father: George Morris
- Sisters: Samantha Morris
- Husband: Ben Lucini (1990–)
- Sons: Jordy Lucini; Michael Lucini
- Daughters: Philippa Lucini
- Grandmothers: Ellen Morris

Carly Lucini (also Morris) is a fictional character from the Australian soap opera Home and Away, played by actress Sharyn Hodgson. She was one of the soap's original female protagonists, appearing as one of the Fletchers' foster children in the pilot episode on 17 January 1988. The soap's primary focus was placed upon the Fletchers and their gang of foster children, moving as outsiders to a caravan park in the seaside town of Summer Bay. Carly remained in the serial as a regular character until 1991, covering issues such as rape, alcoholism and child abuse, as well as a problematic marriage to soldier Ben Lucini, played by actor Julian McMahon. Hodgson has made numerous guest appearances since her exit.

== Creation and casting ==
The character was conceived by the creator and then executive producer of Home and Away, Alan Bateman. Carly is one of five children fostered by Pippa (Vanessa Downing) and Tom Fletcher (Roger Oakley), who move to Summer Bay to begin a new life. Over three hundred actors auditioned for the roles of the Fletcher's foster children in 1987. Actress Sharyn Hodgson was cast as Carly. After being unable to find acting work following her graduation from the Phillip Street Drama School, Hodgson secured a job at a news agency, but on the day she was due to start she received an audition for the role of Carly, which she subsequently won. Hodgson had made a small guest appearance in A Country Practice, but Carly was her first regular television role. Hodgson was nineteen when she was cast, two years older than her teenage character.

== Development ==
In July 1988, Hodgson described Carly as being "17, in her last year at school and like all teens has her problems." She said that she and Carly did not share any similarities, so when she received her first scripts, she had to "work out" how she should portray Carly based upon her fictional history, which she then "built on". Hodgson also portrayed Carly's "nastier" twin sister Samantha Morris, which she called "a big challenge, but good to do."

Carly's rape, which occurred while she was hitchhiking in 1988, was one of the soap's first controversial story lines. Andrew Mercado, author of Super Aussie Soaps, has commented that "although the word 'rape' was never actually uttered on-screen, savvy viewers caught on. In the aftermath of her assault, Carly began drinking heavily and the ratings continued to grow. From a low of 9, Home and Away slowly built its audience until the show was scoring 25 by the end of its first year. The serial was finally a hit". In the storyline, Carly keeps the rape a secret initially, but after the truth comes out the residents of Summer Bay "were shown to be divided as to whether or not Carly had contributed to the situation through reckless behaviour". The aftermath of the event explored Carly's descent into alcoholism and drug abuse, which has been described as "very brave territory for a prime-time soap [...] the Carly Morris storyline pointed to the fact that if there were feathers to be ruffled, Home and Away would ruffle them." During the time of the rape's airing, various protests were launched by the viewing public and the Australian media, who believed it should not have been broadcast. In an interview in 1989, Hodgson defended the storyline, saying "In Home and Away we show life as it really happens. It's not irresponsible to show attacks, unwanted pregnancies or people turning to alcohol. It's realistic and it shows we are confronting these problems. The thing about having a foster family as the main characters is that they do have trauma in their lives. Seeing how they cope must help people". Hodgson researched the storyline by calling the Rape Crisis Centre, reading articles and watching documentaries.

Carly has a few love interests during her time in the show, including Matt Wilson (Greg Benson) and Gary Samuels (Darius Perkins). She also dates Adam Cameron (Mat Stevenson), but producers cut the romance short and soon paired Adam with Emma Jackson (Dannii Minogue), as they thought the characters were better suited.

In early 1990, Italian-Australian soldier Ben Lucini, played by Julian McMahon, was introduced to the show and he became a "major" new love interest for Carly. TV Week's David Brown reported that writers had immediately begun planning a wedding between the pair. Producer Andrew Howie commented, "Their romance will be full-on, bigger than Ben Hur. McMahon later told Barry Divola of Stars of Oz magazine that he and Hodgson worked hard to make it seem that their characters had experienced "love at first sight". Ben and Carly get engaged after a short romance and endure "all that pre-marriage trauma stuff", including finding their first home and paying for it. McMahon told Divola that if he was writing the scripts, the couple would have "bliss", before moving to a farm where they would raise cattle and sheep. The build up to Carly and Ben's wedding episode attracted "a huge amount of interest" from Home and Away viewers. McMahon said he was often stopped in the streets and asked about the wedding preparations.

The lead up to the couple's wedding is "mixed with catastrophes". Writers introduced Ben's interfering cousin and best man Angelo (Raj Sidhu), whose actions cause Ben to leave Carly waiting at the altar. Ben contracts food poisoning shortly before his bucks night, so he takes some medication to help relieve his symptoms. He then opts out of the bucks in favour of drinking a couple of beers, which mix with the medication and put Ben into a deep sleep. Angelo takes advantage of the situation and he and Adam strand Ben in the bush. McMahon said Angelo "is not your most likable character" and reckoned he never thinks about the consequences of his actions. As he is rescued by a passing truck driver, Ben, still under the effects of the medication, tells him that he is from Perth, so the driver begins taking him there. At the church, a "distraught" Carly realises Ben is missing and believes that he has jilted her. Hodgson told TV Week's Glen Williams "there is nothing for Carly to do but go home and grieve about what might have been." Ben eventually makes it back to the Bay and reschedules the wedding for later that day. Hodgson described it as "a bit rushed, but it's a fairytale wedding." The reception goes against tradition, as Carly makes a speech and declares that the Fletchers are her real family, following a sarcastic telegram from her father and sister.

In the 1 September 1990 edition of TV Week, David Brown reported that both Hodgson and McMahon had quit the show to pursue other acting roles. Brown confirmed Hodgson would leave when her contract expired in March 1991, while McMahon's contract was up in December. Brown said Seven Network were negotiating with McMahon to stay until March, so Ben and Carly could depart together.

Since being written out of the serial, Hodgson has made numerous guest appearances in 1997, 2000, 2001, 2002 and 2008, as Carly returns to visit her foster family or attend important events in Summer Bay. Hodgson first reprised the role in late 1997 for Steven and Selina's wedding. Hodgson joined other original cast members, including Alex Papps, Peter Vroom and Craig Thompson, for her foster sister Sally Fletcher's (Kate Ritchie) wedding in 2000. She also returned the following year to visit Sally. Carly's return in 2002 was part of Home and Away producers' attempt to counter a ratings slump, said to have resulted from the "unexpected success" of a rival network's reality TV show Big Brother, which was aired opposite the soap at 7pm weekdays. Hodgson was one of numerous returning cast members, brought back especially for the storyline to mark the 150th anniversary of settlement in Summer Bay. The majority of the cast was boarded onto a ferry boat for a night cruise; however, a "freak storm" ruined the celebrations, leading the boat to sink. The storyline was heavily promoted with the tag "Who Will Survive?". According to Mercado, "Big Brother 2 crumbled against the competition [...]". When she returns in 2003, Carly confirms that she is still married to Ben, who remains off-screen. The pair also have children together. Carly's last appearance, in 2008, was part of Sally's leaving storyline, as she departed the serial after 20 years.

== Storylines ==
Carly as she appeared in 2008

Carly came from an abusive home. Her father George (Helmut Bakaitis) used to beat her, and she had a tempestuous relationship with her twin sister Samantha (also played by Hodgson). Following the death of her mother from a problem with her appendix, she was placed in foster care with the Fletcher family and moves with them to Summer Bay, aged 16. A problematic, selfish teenager, Carly is frequently in trouble at school, and she feuds with her foster sister Bobby Simpson (Nicolle Dickson), though they later patch up their differences and become close friends. Carly attracts the attention of local boy Martin Dibble (Craig Thomson), but she rebuffs his advances preferring surfer Matt Wilson (Greg Benson), though her attempts to attract his attention go unnoticed, and she nearly drowns when she set up a ploy for him to rescue her from the sea. Martin, luckily, is on hand to save Carly.

Whilst hitch-hiking home from visiting Nico Pappas (Nicholas Papademetriou) at the hospital, Carly is raped. Unable to cope with what had happened to her, Carly begins drinking alcohol heavily and using drugs, but curtailed the problem via counseling. Carly then returns to school to repeat Year 12 after failing her HSC but drops out early on to work at the Bayside Diner. Carly becomes involved with her former teacher, Andrew Foley (Peter Bensley) but the relationship falls apart when he succumbs to alcoholism. Carly later dates Adam Cameron (Mat Stevenson) but he later breaks up with her to be with Emma Jackson (Dannii Minogue). Italian soldier Ben Lucini arrives in Summer Bay and is instantly attracted to Carly, they quickly become engaged and marry within months. Ben leaves the army and attempts a career as a farmer, but money is tight for the couple, leading to strain on the marriage. Carly then discovers she is pregnant, which Ben reacts badly to at first but comes round the idea. After Ben is arrested by military police for desertion, the couple relocate to Perth. They later have three children. Although Carly gives birth to a girl named Phillipa in the show, she is later retconned out of existence with Carly and Ben repeatedly being stated to have three sons.

Carly returns six years later for the wedding of Steven Matheson (Adam Willits) and Selina Roberts (Tempany Deckert), which does not go ahead. She returns three years later for Sally Fletcher's non-wedding to Kieran Fletcher (Spencer McLaren) and then the next year to support Sally when she undergoes a hysterectomy. The year after, Summer Bay celebrates its 150th anniversary and Carly returns for the celebrations. Six years later, Carly, returns again for Sally's farewell concert at the school when she leaves Summer Bay.

== In other media ==
A tie-in novel, written by Sharon Clarke, concentrating on Carly Morris and her foster brother Steven Matheson, was released in 1990. Called Carly Morris Story and Steven Matheson Story, the novel chronicled the characters' lives before being fostered by the Fletcher family, outlining their backstories of child abuse and hardship, as well as Carly's history with her malicious twin sister. Another tie-in novel Carly's Crisis covers her alcohol problems shown in episodes up to 1989, written by Trish Howarth.

Hodgson appeared as Carly in a stage musical about the soap, which toured the United Kingdom from June to September 1991. Other cast members taking part included Julian McMahon, Justine Clarke and Adam Willits.

== Reception ==
While discussing the social issues that Home and Away covered in the early years, Jo Abi of Mamamia observed that Carly initially "struggles to find her feet and feels the need to strike out on own, however she is ill-prepared and soon lands herself in trouble." Debi Enker of The Age branded the character "unlucky-in-love". Jason Herbison from All About Soap described Carly stating she is "the Gypsy Nash of her day - she had a drink problem, an evil twin and a penchant for bad boys."

Reporters for TV Week included Carly and Ben in their list of "Home and Away's 30 greatest couples of all time". Of the pair, they wrote "This fiery couple first met in the Diner when handsome soldier Ben Lucini (Julian McMahon) arrived in the Bay while on leave from the army. Carly Morris (Sharyn Hodgson) liked what she saw and they began dating. The pair married in 1990 and moved to Perth soon afterwards." Discussing Carly and Ben, a reporter from Soap World wrote "this romance was a Summer Bay whirlwind for the Italian soldier and the H&A original." Donna Hay from What's on TV included Carly and Ben in their soap opera "marriages made in heaven" list. Hay assessed that "Home and Away's original teenage tearaway Carly finally found the love she had been looking for with soldier Ben Lucini."
