= Josephine Mitchell =

Australian actress and playwright

- Born: 21 May 1965 (age 61); Sydney, Australia
- Other name: Jo Mitchell
- Education: Sydney University
- Occupations: Television actor; stage and musical theatre performer; screenwriter; comedian
- Years active: 1985–
- Known for: A Country Practice (TV series) as Jo Loveday; E Street (TV series) as Penny O'Brien; Home and Away (TV series) as Jane Holland/Jill Carpenter
- Notable work: Neighbours (TV series as Katerina; All Saints (TV series) as Guest
- Spouse: Chris Martin-Jones
- Children: 2

Josephine Mitchell (born 21 May 1965) sometimes credited as Jo Mitchell is an Australian actress and playwright with a lengthy career in theatre and television soap operas and serials.

== Career ==
Mitchell’s first major role was in Seven's drama series A Country Practice as Jo Loveday from 1985 to 1989. In 1990 she played Jane Holland in Home and Away, and has appeared in many of Australia's most popular series including E Street (as designer and mother Penny O'Brien), Neighbours (as Katerina, a wheelchair user) and on All Saints as a one-episode guest, playing a protective mother who mutilated her husband after she found he had molested their daughter.

In 2010, she returned to Home and Away as a different character, that of Jill Carpenter, a dysfunctional alcoholic mother, and the mother of Romeo, played by Luke Mitchell.

Both of Mitchell's parents were heavily involved in theatre, and she has had an extensive career in her own right. She started her own theatre company, Strut Theatre, with other actors to promote women's roles. Strut worked out of Wharf 2 at the Sydney Theatre Company in the early nineties. She produced two plays, Pam Gems and Dusa, Fish, Stas and Vi, as well as a commissioned play by Australian playwright, Justin Fleming called Conversation Peace. She then moved to Melbourne to appear in the national tour of the musical Hello Dolly, produced by John Frost.

She is currently focusing on her work behind the camera as a writer, having finished a feature-length movie titled The Cult and the tele-movie Aren't U Spesh!.

== Personal life ==
Jo Mitchell is married to Australian director and producer Chris Martin-Jones and they have two daughters. The pair met when Martin-Jones was a director on A Country Practice in 1989. His other credits include McLeod's Daughters, Packed to the Rafters, Spartacus, Legend of the Seeker, and A Place to Call Home.

She has a double degree from Sydney University, in Medieval and Religious Studies.

== Selected filmography ==
Year	Title	Role	Type
1985–89	A Country Practice	Jo Loveday (later Langley)	TV series, 254 episodes
1990	Home and Away	Jane Holland	TV series
1991	Mimi Goes to the Analyst	Clara	TV movie
1992	Six Pack	Clara	TV series
1991–93	E Street	Penny O' Brian	TV series, 121 episodes
1994	Neighbours	Katerina Terrelli	TV series
1994	Girl	Nikki Mair	TV movie
2005	All Saints	Amelia Kyd	TV series
2006	TV Turns 50: The Events that Stopped a Nation	Guest (with A Country Practice cast: Lorrae Desmond, Brian Wenzel, Shane Porteous, Joan Sydney, Joyce Jacobs, Anne Tenney & Emily Nichol)	TV special
2010	Home and Away	Jill Carpenter	TV series
2014	Janet King	Dr. Wyburn	TV series, 1 episode
