= Adam Cameron =

- Home and Away character
- Portrayed by: Mat Stevenson
- Duration: 1989–1994, 1999
- First appearance: Episode 338; 28 June 1989
- Last appearance: Episode 2702; 14 September 1999
- Introduced by: Des Monaghan (1989); John Holmes (1999)
In-universe information
- Occupation: Lifeguard; Bonza Burger Franchise Owner
- Father: Ian Cameron
- Mother: Bridget Cameron

Adam Cameron is a fictional character from the Australian Channel Seven soap opera Home and Away, played by Mat Stevenson. Stevenson had previously filmed a guest role on a rival soap opera when he was cast. Adam first appeared on-screen 28 June 1989 until Stevenson left the series in 1994. Adam was reintroduced into the series for a short time in 1999. Adam is characterised as an "intelligent and good-natured guy", though Stevenson said he is a "layabout" who will not do anything that "interferes with having a good time".

== Casting ==
On 23 May 1989, David Brown from TV Week reported that Stevenson had been cast in the role of Adam. Home and Away's executive producer Andrew Howie told Brown that he had planned to make Adam a central character in the series. Howie added that the character would arrive on a boat and end up remaining in Summer Bay. Stevenson had previously played a guest role on fellow soap opera Neighbours as petty criminal Skinner. Stevenson told Cindy Jones from The Sun-Herald that playing Adam was a role-reversal in comparison to Skinner, a part which helped him become more level-headed. Stevenson chose to move from Melbourne to Sydney for filming. Stevenson told the publication that he planned on staying with the serial for at least one year. The actor was nervous and unsure of how he would settle into the show but the crew soon helped him settle in. In 1990, Stevenson told a reporter from TV Week that he was unhappy with the work he carried out on the serial. However, he ended up remaining until 1994, when Stevenson quit the soap.

== Development ==
Adam is nineteen, the only son of Ian and Bridget Cameron, both now deceased. He is an intelligent and good-natured guy with a dry sense of humour and few are not charmed by his wit and power of persuasion. He is physically very fit, and although not a fanatic, loves engaging in sport. As well as a bit of an athlete, Adam is intelligent too, but half way through a Dip. Ed. course his father died. As his mother died some two years before, he inherited the estate which consisted of a modest house and a small amount of life insurance money.

— Kesta Desmond on Adam.

Stevenson told The Sun-Herald that his character only visits Summer Bay to "grab a hamburger" but ends up staying in the area. Adam's parents died beforehand and with the inheritance money he "plans to sail around the world" by building a yacht. When he arrives in the town, three established characters are on the receiving end of trouble from hooligans. Adam attempts to defuse the situation but finds himself in "deep water" and stranded in Summer Bay when they vandalise his yacht.

Stevenson later said that Adam is "a bit of a layabout" who is "capable of a kind word and good deed every now and then". However, Adam would "rather not" do either if doing so "interferes with having a good time or a lazy time". Stevenson said that he liked playing Adam, but noted he was nothing like his character because he is more responsible than Adam is. A columnist for Inside Soap said that Adam is a "one-time joker" and a "happy-go-lucky type of character".

Stevenson told a writer from Look-in that Adam was hurt by the death of his parents and "doesn't want to risk being hurt by anyone else". He starts out as the serial's "Mr Nice Guy and nearly everyone likes him" but he gradually changes. The actor said that Home and Away writing team were aware that he enjoyed playing "real horror" and decided to change Adam. He further explained that "they gradually bring it round to Adam doing a few very underhand things because he needs the money." During his early years he forms a double act with Matt Wilson (Greg Benson). Stevenson told Look-in' reporter that he and Benson shared a similar friendship and would also "joke around" on set. During filming, Stevenson handed Benson a cup of coffee with a cockroach in it and ruined the scene when Benson could not stop laughing.

Writers created a romance story between Adam and Carly Morris (Sharyn Hodgson), cut short when they decided he was better suited to Emma Jackson (Dannii Minogue). An attraction between Adam and Emma was originally played upon their introduction into the series. Stevenson told David Brown from TV Week that "nothing eventuated until Adam began a relationship with Carly. They went through a rough patch and Adam and Emma came together. She decides she's keen on him and goes about wooing him." Stevenson was happy with the redirection of his character, adding that it was a "good angle" to have a more lasting romance.

In 1990, writers paired Adam romantically with Marilyn Chambers (Emily Symons). Stevenson and Symons appeared as the cover stars for TV Week's issue dated 29 December 1990. In the magazine, David Brown revealed that writers had planned "more romantic problems" for the two characters in 1991. Another writer added that "TV Week can reveal that there is trouble ahead for the two teenagers."

In 1999, after many cast members had left the series, producers decided to bring back an old character. The character was later revealed to be Adam. Stevenson said that he "jumped" at the chance to return to Home and Away. He said it took him one week to settle back into the role and admitted that not much had changed on the series. Stevenson later told Jason Herbison of Inside Soap that he enjoyed playing Adam again so much that he considered asking the producer for a full-time return. Adam's return storyline saw him moving into James Fraser's (Michael Piccirilli) house alongside Shauna Bradley (Kylie Watson). Though Adam later decides to leave again and Harry Keller (Justin Melvey) takes his room.

== Storylines ==
Adam is first seen when he rescues Carly, Roo Stewart (Justine Clarke) and Bobby Simpson (Nicolle Dickson) from being assaulted by Morris "Revhead" Gibson (Gavin Harrison) and several of his friends. Adam manages to distract Revhead and the gang by stealing Revhead's car allowing the girls to escape. They thank Adam for his heroics. Adam plans to sail to the Great Barrier Reef and begin charter journeys on his yacht but Revhead and his friend Skid (Chris Harding) trash the yacht as revenge. After getting the yacht fixed Adam receives a booking from Millicent Staples (Julie Haseler) and is attracted to her. When they arrive on an island, Millicent's true colours are revealed when she and her associates steal the yacht and maroon Adam. Adam is eventually found by Bobby and Carly and is upset when his yacht has been found burned out, by the police, who reveal to him that Millicent is a smuggler. This especially hurts as the Yacht was the last portion of his inheritance from his late parents.

Adam manages to put the incident behind him and begins getting involved in many antics with local guys Matt, Martin Dibble (Craig Thomson) and Lance Smart (Peter Vroom). He also begins a relationship with Carly. When Rory Heywood (Gregor Jordan) is eaten by a shark, Adam vows to catch it and ultimately does. After Adam and Carly split up, He has a brief romance with Emma then becomes involved with Marilyn. Adam and Marilyn live together as a couple at the Beach House for a while but they later split up and Adam moves out.

While taking a boat out for a spin with Bobby and Luke Cunningham (John Adam), Adam hits a large piece of driftwood which causes an accident and Bobby is thrown overboard. Bobby is hospitalised and she spends a week in a coma and then the decision is reached to turn her life support machine off. Bobby's husband, Greg Marshall (Ross Newton), blames Adam for the accident and evicts him from the house. When Adam tries to attend the funeral, Greg attacks him and throws him out of the church. Adam is left to feel like an outcast and is generally treated as a pariah by most of the town. Bobby's adopted son, Sam (Ryan Clark) is angry to find Adam is responsible and throws a stick at him. Adam moves into Laura Brennan's (Kris McQuade) old shack near the back lot of the Caravan Park along with Irene Roberts (Lynne McGranger) and her son Nathan (David Dixon). One day while Adam and Irene are out, Sam hides out in the house and accidentally starts a fire. Adam acts quickly to save Sam and is hailed as a hero. After being forgiven, Adam leaves Summer Bay.

Five years later, Adam returns to Summer Bay as the new manager of The Bonza Burger Kiosk in the Surf Club and begins throwing his weight around by threatening to sack Sally Fletcher (Kate Ritchie) and generally making her life difficult. Adam is then embroiled in a prank war with Sally's boyfriend Vinnie Patterson (Ryan Kwanten). When Irene offers Adam a place to live he is shocked to find Hayley Smith (Bec Cartwright), who had argued with him earlier about his treatment of Sally, is living there. Adam then opts to move in with doctor James Fraser and Shauna Bradley. Adam is attracted to Shauna but she has no interest in him and things are not eased when Shauna is being stalked and accuses Adam of taking things from her room. After James evicts Adam, he decides to leave the bay once more after securing a transfer with another Bonza Burger franchise.

== Reception ==
TV Week's John Burtt said that "during his time in the Bay, larrikin Adam had more than a few run-in with Alf. He also romanced Carly, Emma and Marilyn." Robin Oliver of The Sydney Morning Herald opined that Adam was "the character most in need of a good old-fashioned come-uppance." A columnist for Inside Soap said that "Adam sails pretty close to the wind when it comes to staying on the right side of the law, and some of his little business ventures are dodgy to say the least." A writer from TV Guide opined that Adam and Grant splashed around the waters of Summer Bay in their "merrily macho way". Unimpressed by their showmanship they wanted them to be killed off, joking "where the hell is that shark now that we need him?"
