= Les Hill =

Australian actor (born 1973)

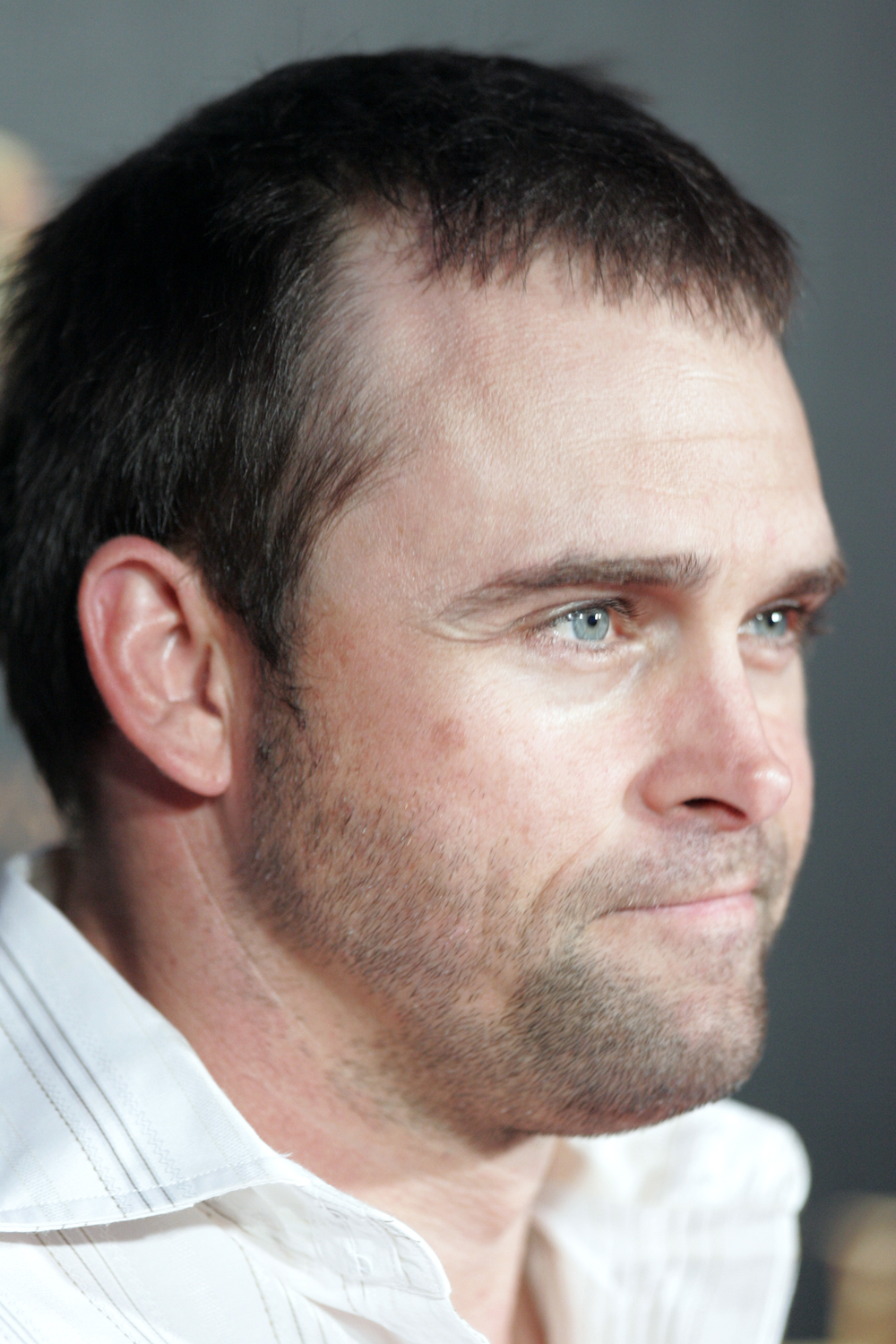
- Hill in 2012
- Born: 1 August 1973 (age 53); Paddington, New South Wales, Australia
- Occupation: Actor
- Years active: 1990–present
- Known for: Home and Away as Blake Dean; Underbelly as Jason Moran; Rescue: Special Ops as Dean Gallagher

Les Hill (born 1 August 1973) is an Australian actor who has appeared in many Australian television productions including Home and Away, Underbelly, and Rescue: Special Ops.

== Early life ==
Hill was born in the Royal Hospital for Women in Randwick, New South Wales on 1 August 1973 and he has a younger sister named Rebecca. Hill attended Prairiewood High School in Wetherill Park, New South Wales. While at school, he became "rowdy" and was eventually asked to leave.

== Acting career ==
Hill joined the cast of Home and Away playing the role of Blake Dean; which Hill said helped him make friends in the acting business. He also acted in the film Flirting, which required him to perform his first naked frontal scene. He also played one of the main roles in Pirates Island 1991. This film was very popular in Russia in 1990-s.

Hill is also known for his role as underworld figure Jason Moran in the 2008 series Underbelly. He had a starring role in the drama series Rescue: Special Ops.

Hill has also appeared in Pacific Drive as Grant Crozier in 1997, Water Rats, Wildside, the Nine Network series Scorched, and the 2010 Steven Spielberg produced miniseries The Pacific. He also starred in Peter Benchley's The Beast alongside fellow Home and Away actor Laura Vasquez, playing one of the divers that was killed by the giant squid.

Hill reprised his role of Jason Moran in the sequel/spin-off series Fat Tony & Co. which was not a part of the Underbelly franchise due to financing reasons. The show focused on the rise and fall of Tony Mokbel, who also featured in the original series, played by Robert Mammone.

In 2014 and 2015, Hill starred in Wonderland as Max Saliba, a new resident with an air of mystery about him.

== Film and television ==
=== Film ===
Date	Work	Role	Type
2015	Crushed	David	
2014	Locks of Love	James	
2014	Handyman	Hal / Les Hill	Short film
2012	The Great Mint Swindle	Lawyer	TV film
2009	Separation City	Harry Ronayne	Feature film
2008	Scorched	Tom	TV film
2008	Candy for My Baby	Man	Short film
1996	The Beast	Diver	TV film
1991	Flirting	Greg Gilmore	Feature film
1990	Pirates Island	Tony	Feature film

=== Television ===
Date	Work	Role	Type
2023	One Night	Detective Clemmens	TV series
2020	Drunk History Australia	Abe Saffron	TV series
2018	Rake	Tradesman Gabe	TV series, 1 episode
2018	Patricia Moore	Richard Moore	TV series, 9 episodes
2016	Love Child	Captain Bruce	TV series, 2 episodes
2014–15	Wonderland	Max Saliba	TV series. 22 episodes
2014	In a Woman's World	Robert Priestly	TV series, 1 episode
2014	Fat Tony & Co	Jason Moran	TV series, 3 episodes,
2014	House Husbands	Simon Lawson-West	TV series, 4 episodes
2011	Terra Nova	Hooper	TV series, 2 episodes
2009–11	Rescue Special Ops	Dean Gallagher	TV series, 48 episodes
2010	The Pacific	1st Lieutenant Ben Sohn	TV miniseries, 1 episode
2009	Rogue Nation	Sergeant Sutherland	TV series, 1 episode
2008	Underbelly	Jason Moran	TV miniseries, 8 episodes
2007	East West 101	Ballistics Officer	TV series, 1 episode
1999	Wildside	Ned	TV series
1998	Water Rats	Adrian	TV series
1997	Pacific Drive	Grant Crozier	TV series
1990–2005	Home and Away	Blake Dean	TV series, 375 episodes
