= Roger Oakley =

New Zealand actor (born 1943)

- Born: 21 August 1943 (age 83); Auckland, New Zealand
- Occupations: Actor; theatre director; voice-over
- Years active: 1967–present
- Known for: Home and Away as Tom Fletcher (1988–1990, 2008)
- Notable work: The Sullivans as Major Barrington (1978–1979); Something in the Air as Doug Rutherford (2000–2002)

Roger Oakley (born 21 August 1943) is a New Zealand-born actor and noted for his performances in Australian television serials, mini-series, feature and television films. He is also active as a theatre performer, director and voice-over. Oakley has been a professional working actor for nearly 60 years.

== Early life ==
Oakley was born in Auckland, North Island, New Zealand on 21 August 1943 and had a regular suburban upbringing. After leaving Auckland Grammar School, he studied languages in New Zealand, before he moved to England where he started his career in theatre. He emigrated to Australia in 1978, carving out a successful career on screen, although he has continued to appear in theatre productions

== Career ==
He is perhaps best known for his role in Home and Away as the original character of foster and (later adoptive) father Tom Fletcher between 1988 and 1990, (with a brief guest appearance in 2008) opposite co-star Vanessa Downing who played his wife Pippa Fletcher before the role was recast with Debra Lawrance Playing the pivotal role of the foster father, at the beginning of the show as the series patriarch Oakley was considered by producers as the most important central member of the older cast.

He appeared in the ABC series Something in the Air as controversial politician Doug Rutherford between 2000 and 2002.

His other notable roles include The Sullivans appearing in both the television series and film version as Major Barrington.

Oakley appeared in feature film roles including in 1977 in his native New Zealand in the movie Sleeping Dogs starring Sam Neill, and in Australia in Sara Dane, Women of the Sun, TheFar Country, Travelling North .The Last of the Ryans My Year Without Sex but has also appeared in numerous telemovies and mini-series including the 12-part serial The Damnation of Harvey McHugh.

Other TV credits include: Cop Shop, Prisoner, A Country Practice, The Flying Doctors, Good Guys Bad Guys, Blue Heelers, The Young Doctors and Neighbours.

He featured in the stage productions of My Fair Lady, The NightWatchman, Circle Mirror Transformation by Annie Baker, and The Golden Dragon by contemporary German playwright Roland Schimmelpfennig. He also appeared in the television series Underbelly and Winners and Losers.

== Filmography ==
=== Film ===
Year	Title	Role	Type
1977	Sleeping Dogs	Assassin Leader	Film
1977	The McKenzie Affair	Sidebottom	
1977	Hunters Gold	Cameron	
1979	The John Sullivan Story	Major Barrington	TV movie
1987	Travelling North	Stan	Feature film
1987	Ground Zero	Commercial Director	Feature film
1988	The Far Country	Immigration Officer	
1997	The Last of the Ryans	Justice Starke	TV film
1998	Halifax f.p.	Frank Bailey	TV film
2009	My Year Without Sex	Natalie's Father	Feature film
2011	Underbelly Files: The Man Who Got Away	Customs Officer	TV movie

=== Television ===
Year	Title	Role	Type
1978	The Park Terrace Murder	Sgt McKnight	TV film
1978	The Sullivans	Major Barrington	TV series
1978	Against the Wind	Father Dixon	TV miniseries
1978	Cop Shop	Dick Davies / Peter Miller	TV series
1979	Skyways	Joe D'Angelo	TV series, 2 episodes
1982	Sons and Daughters	Dr. Parker	TV series
1982	Sara Dane	Major Foveaux	TV miniseries
1982	Women of the Sun	Mr. Johnson	TV miniseries
1983	Prisoner	Chris Young	TV series
1982–84	A Country Practice	Chilla Yates / Bill Young	TV series
1984	Special Squad	Conlon	TV series
1984	Eureka Stockade	Scobie	TV miniseries
1987	The Flying Doctors	Bert Webster	TV series
1988–90, 2008	Home and Away	Tom Fletcher	TV series
1990	Motormouth		TV series
1994	The Damnation of Harvey McHugh	Bernard	TV miniseries
1995	Correlli	Jack Glennen	TV miniseries
1996	Shark Bay		TV series
1997	Hercules: The Legendary Journeys	King Xenon	
1997	Good Guys, Bad Guys	Ron "Maddog" Morello	TV series
1998	State Coroner	Barry Randall	TV series
1999	Duggen	Brigadier Endacott	
1999	Joe Wilkinson	Mr. Wilkinson	
2000	Blue Heelers	Russ Cavell	TV series
2000–02	Something in the Air	Doug Rutherford	TV series
2006	Court of Lonely Royals		
2007	Blue Heelers	Sam Curtis	TV series
2008	Neighbours	Jim Parker	TV series
2008	The Hollowmen		TV series
2008	Satisfaction	Greg	
2011	Game	Simon	
2011	The Last Waltz	Liam	
2013	Winners & Losers	Uncle Pat O'Keefe	TV series
2017	Utopia	Chairman of Independent Board	TV series
2017	Serving Joy		
2019	Glitch	Mike	TV series
2021	Superwog	Barrister (Mr Mark Sheean)	TV series
2022	This is Your Life	Guest (honouring Ray Meagher)	TV series
2023	Deadloch	Father Terrance	
