= Sharyn Hodgson =

Australian actress (born 1968)

- Born: 25 August 1968 (age 58); Sydney, New South Wales, Australia
- Occupation: Actress (former)
- Known for: Home and Away as Carly Morris

Sharyn Hodgson (born 25 August 1968) is an Australian former actress, best known as an original character in TV serial Home and Away playing troubled teenager Carly Morris (later Luccini), she has subsequently returned to the role guest appearances reprising the part until 2008.

== Early life ==
Hodgson was born in Sydney and attended drama school with the Phillip Street Drama School when she was 15. She spent four years studying there on Saturday mornings, which led to work with the Film and Television School appearing in films for students.

== Career ==
Hodgson had a guest role in TV serial A Country Practice in 1987, before auditioning for Home and Away the Seven Network's fledgling soap opera in that year. She was successfully cast and became one of the sixteen original characters, appearing from the pilot episode which initially aired in January 1988. She played troubled teenager Carly Morris, during her time on the show, Hodgson's character weathered rape, alcoholism, and an array of relationship and family problems, which were all chronicled with a tie-in novel, Sharyn also portrayed Carly's twin sister Samantha Morris.

Carly eventually finds love with Army soldier Ben Lucini portrayed by (Julian McMahon) in 1991, and leaves Summer Bay the same year to begin a family elsewhere.

Following this, Hodgson was one of several Home and Away cast members to star in a stage musical based on the soap, which toured the UK in 1991. Julian McMahon, Justine Clarke, Mouche Phillips and Adam Willits also starred.

Since her initial on-screen departure, Hodgson has made numerous brief returns to Home and Away to visit her foster family or attend important events in the bay. Hodgson was last seen on-screen as Carly in 2008. She returned briefly for the departure of one of the original character, her foster sister Sally Fletcher (Kate Ritchie).

Hodgson has post-Home and Away appeared in episodes of Blue Heelers, Frank Sidebottom's Fantastic Shed Show (1992), Police Rescue (1995), Wildside (1998) and Big Sky playing Jodie Turner (1997–99).

== Personal life ==
Hodgson decided to quit acting to become a mother. She works as a natural therapist and childcare worker, having fostered children of her own.

== Filmography ==
Year	Title	Role	Notes
1987	A Country Practice	Leanne	Season 7, Episode 52
1988–91, 1997, 2000–02, 2008	Home and Away	Carly Morris/Lucini	Pilot TV movie
1988–91, 1997, 2000–02, 2008	Home and Away	Carly Morris/Lucini	Seasons 1–4 (main role, 496 episodes)
1988–91, 1997, 2000–02, 2008	Home and Away	Carly Morris/Lucini	Seasons 10, 13–15, 21 (recurring, 14 episodes)
1988	Home and Away	Samantha Morris	Season 1 (recurring, 10 episodes)
1995	Police Rescue	Kerry	Season 4, Episode 7
1997–99	Big Sky	Jodie Turner	Seasons 1–2 (recurring, 6 episodes)
1998	Wildside	Jo Mitchell	Season 1, Episode 28
