= Adam Willits =

Australian actor

- Born: 18 February 1972 (age 54); New South Wales, Australia
- Occupation: Former actor
- Years active: 1984–2014

Adam Charles Willits (born 18 February 1972) is an Australian former actor, best known for being an original cast member of the television soap opera Home and Away as foster child Steven Matheson from 1988 to 1991. In 1995, Willits returned to the show as a regular and a love interest for the character of Selina Roberts, portrayed by Tempany Deckert, and remained until late 1996 as well as returning for guest stints in 1997, 1998, 2000, 2002, 2003 and the last time in 2008.

Willits’ TV credits include sitcom Hampton Court, All Saints and serial Rake. He also appeared in the film Mad Max Beyond Thunderdome.

He was one of several Home and Away cast-members to star in a stage musical based on the soap, which toured the UK in 1991. Julian McMahon, Sharyn Hodgson, Mouche Phillips and Justine Clarke also starred. Willits now works in the insurance industry.

== Filmography ==
=== Film ===
| Year | Title | Role | Production |
|---|---|---|---|
| 1984 | Marbles | | Film |
| | Anna | | Film |
| | Damsel be Damned | | Film |
| | Weekend of the Lonesome Hustler | | Film |
| 1985 | Mad Max Beyond Thunderdome | Mr. Scratch | Film |
| 1985 | The Perfectionist | Shaun Gunn | TV film |
| 2003 | Room 14 | The Writer | Film short |

=== Television ===
| Year | Title | Role | Production |
|---|---|---|---|
| 1984 | The Maestro's Company | Johnny | TV series |
| 1988–1991, 1995–1997, 1998, 2000, 2002, 2003, 2008 | Home and Away | Steven Matheson | Pilot, Seasons 1–4, 8–10 (main, 611 episodes) |
| 1988–1991, 1995–1997, 1998, 2000, 2002, 2003, 2008 | Home and Away | Steven Matheson | Seasons 11, 13, 15,16, 21 (recurring, 12 episodes) |
| 1991 | Hampton Court | Richard Granville | TV series, 13 episodes |
| 2002 | All Saints | Ivan Quinn | TV series |
| 2014 | Rake | Policeman | TV series |
