= Pilot (Home and Away) =

- Home and Away episode
- Episode no.: Season 1 Episode 1
- Directed by: Riccardo Pellizzeri
- Written by: Bevan Lee
- Original air date: 17 January 1988
- Running time: 93 minutes

Guest appearances
- Bruce Venables as Policeman; John Stone as Mr Jarvis; Greg Benson as Surfer; John O'Brien as Tarquin Pearce; John Douglas as Tom's Boss; Gwen Plumb as Doris Peters; Monroe Reimers as Bill; Peter Boswell as Mervin Baldivis; Kay Eklund as Miss Purvis; Rob Baxter as Bob Barnett

Episode chronology
← Previous —	Next → "Episode 1"

Pilot is the first episode of the Australian soap opera Home and Away. It premiered on Network Seven on 17 January 1988. The episode was written by Bevan Lee, directed by Riccardo Pellizzeri, and executively produced by Alan Bateman. Home and Away and the pilot were developed for the Seven Network and Bateman had been planning it for three years prior. The premise for the episode and show was inspired by a chance stop Bateman made in a New South Wales coastal town. He witnessed local opposition against a foster home from problematic city children. Numerous actors auditioned for the roles featured in the episode and cast details were announced on 4 July 1987. Production and filming of the pilot commenced on 6 July 1987 at Palm Beach.

The episode focuses on the Fletcher family, consisting of Tom Fletcher (Roger Oakley) and Pippa Fletcher (Vanessa Downing) and their foster children. They move from their busy city life to the coastal town of Summer Bay to run the local caravan park. Upon their arrival, they encounter the town's local residents as they attempt to fit into the community. Bobby Simpson's (Nicolle Dickson) storyline, featuring her wayward behaviour and eventual fostering by the Fletchers, forms much of the story. Actress Carol Willesee was originally hired to play the pivotal role of Pippa but quit after two days of filming. Bateman revealed that Willesee failed to recognise the commitment needed to an ongoing role, and Pippa was recast to Downing.

The episode was later broadcast in Ireland and United Kingdom, where network executives wanted it to rival the success of the fellow Australian soap opera Neighbours. The pilot episode received positive reviews from critics of the genre. It was also revealed on home media in the UK on VHS and later featured on the Home and Away: Romances DVD release.

== Plot ==
In 1978, Frank Morgan (Bradley Pilato) is arrested by apoliceman (Bruce Venables). Tom Fletcher (Roger Oakley) and Pippa Fletcher (Vanessa Downing) agree to foster him. In 1988, the Fletchers celebrate Tom's 40th birthday party, joined by Frank (now played by Alex Papps) and their other foster children Carly Morris (Sharyn Hodgson), Steven Matheson (Adam Willits), Lynn Davenport (Helena Bozich) and Sally Keating (Kate Ritchie). Frank suspects that Steven is hiding something when he secretly visits his sensei Bill (Monroe Reimers) for karate practice. Steven explains to Bill that he feels he does not fit into the Fletcher family. Tom loses his job and sells their house, to prevent the foster children being taken away.

The Fletchers arrive in Summer Bay and view a caravan park and house for sale from Alf Stewart (Ray Meagher). He gives Tom the impression the business was more successful than it was. Floss McPhee (Sheila Kennelly) attempts to warn Pippa, but she tells her they will make it work. Neville McPhee (Frank Lloyd) hides Bobby Simpson (Nicolle Dickson) in a caravan, but she accidentally hits Sally. Tom and Frank find Bobby, but Donald Fisher (Norman Coburn) gets her arrested for burgling his home, despite her protesting her innocence. She is put on a good behaviour bond.

Carly is not impressed with Martin Dibble (Craig Thomson) and Lance Smart (Peter Vroom) but is attracted to local surfer Matt Wilson (Greg Benson). Doris Peters (Gwen Plumb) gossips about Pippa in the shop and listens into Ailsa Hogan's (Judy Nunn) conversation with Pippa. Ailsa states that the town are divided about their feelings towards Bobby and urges Pippa to help her. Bobby berates Carly, Lynn and Sally about being arrested and Pippa goes to confront Bobby. She offers her the opportunity to move into the caravan park in exchange for work, but she refuses. A caravan is set on fire and Bobby protests her innocence. Pippa believes Bobby and tells the police not to pursue the matter. Lance reveals his colleague caused the fire, which results in a fight between Bobby, Lance and Martin. Steven rescues Bobby and she thanks him but is shocked to discover the Fletcher children are all fostered. Bobby reconsiders Pippa's offer and moves into a caravan.

Donald uses his position in the town to prevent Tom from gaining work and reports the Fletchers to child services. He claims that Tom cannot find work and is allowing a criminal like Bobby to stay on site. Neville gets Ailsa to interrupt the Fletcher's meeting with Tarquin Pearce (John O'Brien). She pretends to give Tom a job to stop Tarquin deciding to take the children away. He is impressed but shocked when he finds Carly and Bobby fighting outside. Carly blames herself for but Bobby breaks her good behaviour bond and leaves town. She locates Tarquin and tells him that the Fletchers are good family and he must reconsider breaking the family up. He is impressed and Bobby is sent to court. Tarquin asks Tom and Pippa to foster Bobby, they agree and she becomes their sixth foster child.

== Production ==
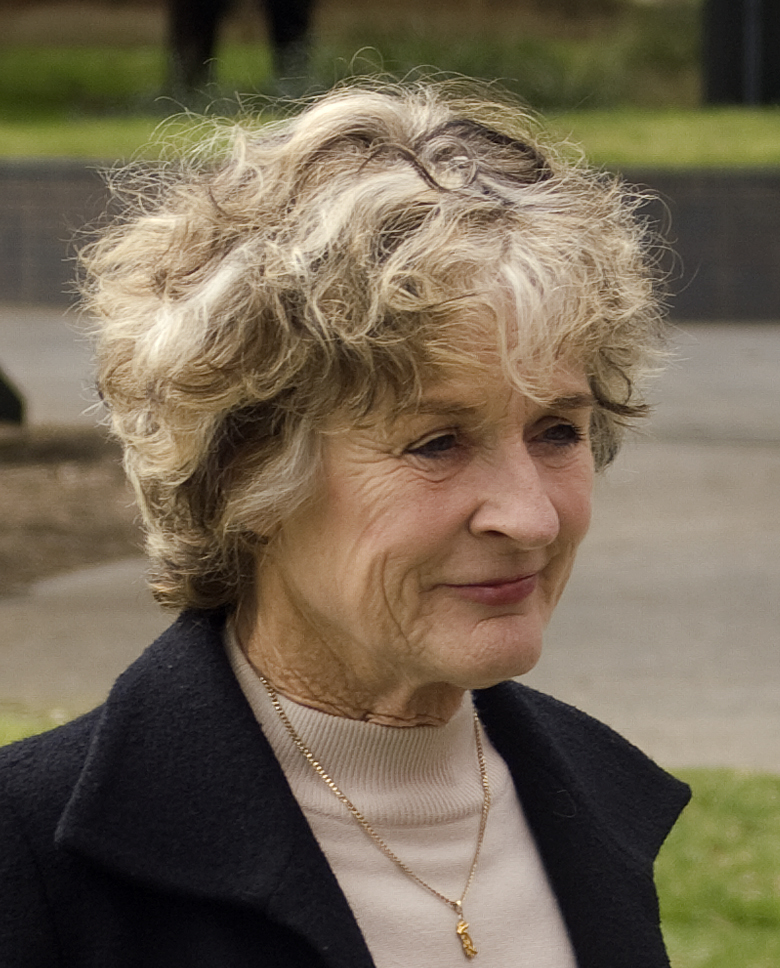
Judy Nunn appears as Ailsa Hogan. Her husband Bruce Venables also appeared in a Policeman guest role.

The show had been in development by executive producer Alan Bateman for three years prior to filming. The pilot's story was inspired by Bateman's personal experience. He once made a chance stop in a small New South Wales coastal town where he witnessed local opposition against a foster home from problematic city children. Bateman later recalled "I saw then the outline of a show." Discussing the creation of the foster children, Bateman told Keith Richmond of Sunday Mirror that "we have thousands of kids over here who end up in court because their parents weren't around. They became my characters."

More than three hundred people went through a casting process for the pilot's main cast. Bateman revealed "I haven't cast models or non-professional people who looked right, I've gone for people who can act." Casting details for the characters featured in the pilot episode were publicised in the 4 July 1987 edition of TV Week. Journalist Matt Byrne revealed that Alex Papps had signed to appear as eldest child Frank Morgan alongside Carol Willesee and Roger Oakley as his foster parents, Pippa and Tom Fletcher. Other described roles cast included shop keeper Ailsa Hogan (Judy Nunn), boatshed owner Alf Stewart (Ray Meagher). Sheila Kennelly and Frank Lloyd signed up to play the married couple Floss and Neville McPhee. Their characters were touted as being a set of "surrogate grandparents" to the foster children. Sharyn Hodgson, Adam Willits and Kate Ritchie's castings were also publicised but no details of their characters were released aside from them being members of the foster family. Nunn's then fiancé, Bruce Venables also guest starred in the pilot as a Policeman.

Filming of the pilot episode commenced from 6 July 1987 and concluded that month. Filming took place at Palm Beach. Willesee was originally selected to play the "pivotal role" Pippa. When filming began, the Seven Network became worried because Willesee had not signed a contract. The actress revealed that she had already arranged for time off work for family commitments. The network realised that the situation was not working and decided to recast Pippa and reshoot Willesee's scenes. Willesee had only filmed for two days when her contract was revoked and she left the set. Bateman criticised Willesee for failing to realise the commitment needed to a professional acting role in an ongoing series. Producers contacted Vanessa Downing who had previously auditioned for the role. They requested that she attend filming for the pilot the following day. Downing told TV Week's Byrne that she accepted the offer even though she was already working on the theatre production of Madrigirls at Sydney's Belvoir theatre. Downing continued to appear in the production in the evenings and film the pilot during the day. Filming of the pilot episode lasted for three weeks and Downing added that it was "very fast going - we were there 12 hours a day - but they still took a lot of care and everyone is confident that it will be taken up as a series." In addition Gwen Plumb stars in the episode as the "town nosey parker" Doris Peters. Doris was intended to be a regular character, but the actress decided to join the cast of Richmond Hill after filming of the pilot episode had finished.

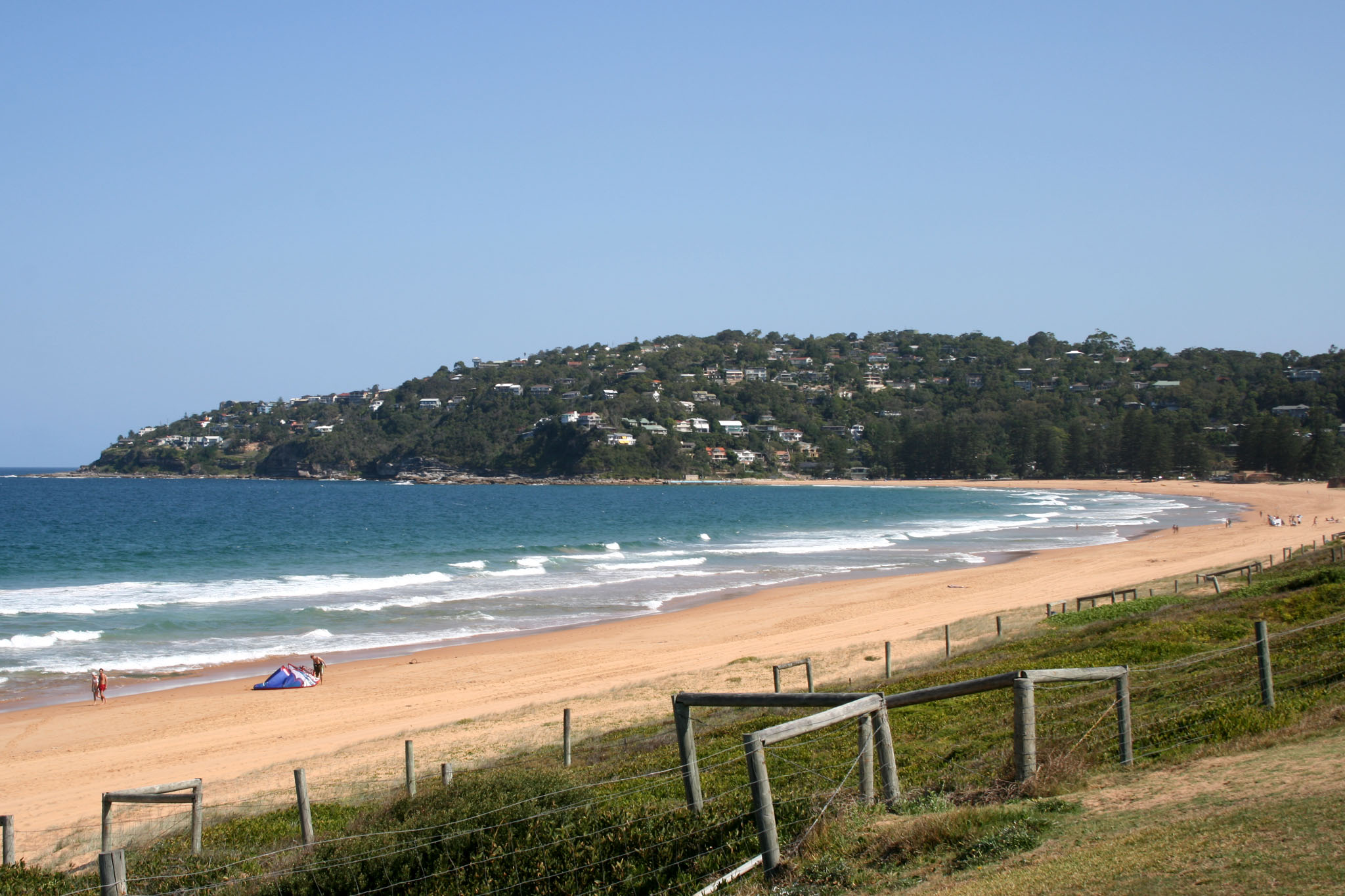
The episode was partly filmed at Palm Beach.

The episode was written by Bevan Lee. Bateman developed the "basic story" for the characters Tom and Pippa to play out in the pilot episode. Tom and Pippa adopt children because they cannot have any of their own. But Tom is fired from his job and he decides to relocate the Fletcher family from the city to Summer Bay. Bateman believed that the structure of the first episode "demonstrates a reasonable sense of pace", noting that viewers are introduced to the entire Fletcher family, their troubles and move to Summer Bay all before the second commercial break. Another main narrative in the episode is the story of Bobby who divides opinion due to her aggressive manner. By the end of the pilot episode, Bobby becomes to newest foster child to the Fletchers. Other stories featured explore the lives of the remaining locals including Alf, Ailsa, Donald, Floss, Neville, Martin and Lance. In October 1987, it was announced that the Seven Network had commissioned the show into the full-time series. On 4 January 1988, Robin Oliver from The Sydney Morning Herald announced that Home and Away would begin airing on the Seven Network that month. To promote the series ahead of transmission, the Seven Network issued promotional kits to news outlets which featured zinc cream, underwear and a beach towel.

== Broadcast and ratings ==
An advance screening of the episode occurred on 6 January 1988 at a promotional event hosted at the Flamingos restaurant in Palm Beach. It was shown in a condensed format, with journalists, Seven Network executives and cast members in attendance. The full episode was originally broadcast in Australia via Seven Network on 17 January 1988, placed in the Sunday 7:30 PM evening timeslot. When the episode was broadcast in Perth it accumulated a thirty seven per cent audience share, beating the "rival" soap opera Neighbours, who managed three per cent.

In Ireland, the pilot was divided into two one-hour-long showing, the first premiered on Network 2 on 3 October 1988. It was placed in the 6:00 PM timeslot which was designed to directly compete directly Neighbours. In the United Kingdom, the pilot was edited into a one-hour format and debuted on 11 February 1989. It was broadcast on ITV, in their Saturday 5:15 PM timeslot. In July 2012, the pilot was rebroadcast in the United Kingdom on 5* and an average of 221000 viewers watched the episode.

== Home media ==
The episode was released onto VHS under the title "Home And Away - The Movie" in the UK. It was also released onto VHS as a Starvision edition and titled "Home and Away". It was sold and distributed via Entertainment UK and received a Universal rating. The episode was featured on the 2006 DVD release Home and Away: Romances as bonus material.

== Reception ==
The Sydney Morning Herald's Oliver opined that watching the pilot episode made Home and Away appear as "an immensely stronger serial" than the rival soap Neighbours. Lucy Clark writing for The Sydney Morning Herald said that the pilot episode made Home and Away appear as a "high quality soap". She added it set the scene "for a nice, warm series that just might become another long running Australian drama." Clark also included it in newspapers "pick of the day" television feature. After watching the episode Mark Patrick said that Home and Away was a "humdinger" and his "favourite character was Milko, an invisible friend of one of the brats". Morris Gleitzman wrote that Tom and Pippa behaved in a way all parents aspire to in the episode. He noted that their "equanimity" comes from not having children of their own. Gleitzman liked the inclusion of Sally's imaginary friend, Milko, branding it a "bold dramatic device". He also praised the entire Fletcher family, stating "on the surface the Fletchers are as cheerful a bunch of people as you could wish to meet - warm, caring and in no way resentful of the demographic responsibilities they bear."

Eamonn McCusker of The Digital Fix said the episode was more dramatic than later episodes, but still had "as much drama as a mild bout of indigestion". While he felt the episode was "great fun", he noted that it contained "cheap television" when Bobby said "Rack off!" He also criticised the filming of beach scenes because they appeared as though they had been shot in a "force nine gale". John Little from Sunday World criticised the writing of Tom following his job redundancy. Little quipped that it was "no wonder everyone in Ireland wants to emigrate to Australia." He noted that despite being made redundant, Tom still owns a large vehicle and buys an "average sized mansion in the country". Reviewing a promotional photograph of Bobby and Carly fighting, a Halifax Courier critic assessed that "there is plenty of tension" in the pilot. Judith Moss from Liverpool Echo reviewed that the Fletchers seemingly left their "nightmares" behind in the city, but their arrival in Summer Bay is "when the problems really begin".
