= Home and Away: Weddings =

Exclusive-to-DVD special of Australia's most popular soap Home and Away

- DVD cover for Weddings

Release
- Original network: Seven

Home and Away: Weddings is an exclusive-to-DVD special of Australia's most popular soap Home and Away. It was released on 1 March 2006 and is a continuation to its previous DVD Home and Away: Romances, which is in a similar style. It takes a lookback at all the classic Home and Away weddings from it 18 years from between 1988 and 2006 and it is hosted by Home and Away star Kate Ritchie and contains every Summer Bay wedding in a movie length presentation. Also included is 2 full episodes from Leah and Vinnie's wedding.

== Weddings ==
Year	Couple	Played by
1988	Ailsa & Alf	Judy Nunn and Ray Meagher
1988	Ruth & Frank	Justine Clarke and Alex Papps
1989	Bobby & Frank	Nicolle Dickson and Alex Papps
1990	Carly & Ben	Sharyn Hodgson and Julian McMahon
1991	Pippa & Michael	Debra Lawrance and Denis Coard
1992	Bobby & Greg	Nicolle Dickson and Ross Newton
1995	Angel & Shane	Melissa George and Dieter Brummer
1996	Marilyn & Don	Emily Symons and Norman Coburn
1997	Rebecca & Travis	Belinda Emmett and Nic Testoni
1998	Kylie & Jesse	Roslyn Oades and Ben Unwin
1999	Chloe & James	Kirsty Wright and Michael Piccirilli
2000	Sally & Kieran	Kate Ritchie and Spencer McLaren
2001	Leah & Vinnie	Ada Nicodemou and Ryan Kwanten
2002	Gypsy & Will	Kimberley Cooper and Zac Drayson
2003	Sally & Flynn	Kate Ritchie and Joel McIlroy
2004	Beth & Rhys	Clarissa House and Michael Beckley
2004	Kirsty & Kane	Christie Hayes and Sam Atwell
2004	Hayley & Noah	Rebecca Cartwright and Beau Brady
2005	Josie & Jesse	Laurie Foell and Ben Unwin
2005	Tasha & Robbie	Isabel Lucas and Jason Smith
2005	Leah & Dan	Ada Nicodemou and Tim Campbell
2005	Amanda & Graham	Holly Brisley and Doug Scroope

== Interviews ==
- Kimberley Cooper - Gypsy Nash
- Ada Nicodemou - Leah Patterson
- Kip Gamblin - Scott Hunter
- Jason Smith - Robbie Hunter
- Tim Campbell - Dan Baker

== Trivia ==
Throughout Weddings, facts about Home and Away appear on screen:

- Just weeks after her wedding, Bobby found out Morag and Don were her real parents.
- Nearly all the Home and Away wedding dresses have been kept for posterity.
- Four identical copies were made of Sally's dress to allow for stunt scenes.
- The bridesmaids' dresses were designed by Melissa Kritsotakis.

== DVD ==
Home and Away: Weddings
Set Details
Special Features
- 1 disc
- 1.78:1 aspect ratio
- 128 minutes
- English Dolby Digital 2.0
- Leah and Vinnie's entire wedding and reception (episodes 2998 & 2999)
Release Dates
Region 1
Region 2
Region 4
N/A
5 February 2007
1 March 2006

== See also ==
- Home and Away
- Home and Away: Secrets and the City
- Home and Away: Hearts Divided
- Home and Away: Romances
