= Floss McPhee =

- Home and Away character
- Portrayed by: Sheila Kennelly
- Duration: 1988–1989, 2000, 2002, 2004, 2008
- First appearance: 17 January 1988
- Last appearance: 3 April 2008
- Introduced by: Alan Bateman (1988); John Holmes (2000); Julie McGuaran (2002, 2004); Cameron Welsh (2008)
In-universe information
- Occupation: Itinerant Carnival worker Fortune teller
- Husband: Neville McPhee (1949–96)
- Sons: Scott McPhee
- Grandsons: Ben McPhee

Floss McPhee is a fictional character from the Australian television soap opera Home and Away, played by Sheila Kennelly. The character made her first screen appearance on 17 January 1988, which was the show's pilot episode. She departed in 1989, when she was written out of the series along with Frank Lloyd who played her on-screen husband Neville McPhee. However she has made sporadic returns first in 2000, for Sally Fletcher's (Kate Ritchie) wedding storyline and again in 2002, 2004 and 2008, for various story arcs. Floss is characterised as a kind, gregarious carnival worker and fortune teller who is devoted to her husband Neville, though they bicker constantly.

== Casting ==
When actress Sheila Kennelly secured the role of Floss in Home and Away she was also due to film a small role in the 1988 film Evil Angels. The schedule clashed with the first week of filming on Home and Away and Kennelly decided to pull out of the role in Evil Angels. At the time she owned a farm and would have to leave her farm before 5 AM to arrive on-set in good time, despite sometimes being up all night tending to her livestock.

== Development ==
=== Characterisation ===
Floss is characterised as a "naturally gregarious" woman. Floss is kind and "would open her purse for anyone" in need. Profiling the character in the book Home and Away – Official Collector’s Edition, Andrea Black wrote "a carnival worker, Floss was Summer Bay's resident psycic." Writers created an on-screen partnership between Floss and her husband Neville McPhee (Frank Lloyd). Together they play the part of retired residents of Summer Bay's caravan park and continue their thirty-five year marriage. They have been described by the show's publicity team as "thoroughly devoted, although constantly bickering." Neville is more "stingy" in comparison to the kind Floss. This leads the pair to have quarrels but their love for each other ensures they always make up quickly. In the official "Home and Away Annual", author Kesta Desmond wrote that the source of Floss and Neville's constant bickering was money problems, but noted that a long marriage proved their love for each other. In their backstory Floss and Neville once toured the carnival circuit. The show's producers told author James Oram that "to people who don't know them, it seems as if they are always bickering, but they both thoroughly enjoy their arguments. In their own way, they are devoted to one another." Lloyd enjoyed working with Kennelly on creating the partnership between their characters. He told Oram that Kennelly is "an absolutely marvelous lady and a superb actress. We hit it off right from the word go and had some wonderful times."

Kennelly became concerned that the characters of Floss and Neville were not being developed by the show's production team. She noted that writers never explored Floss' life in the carnival and instead chose to focus more on the younger characters. Ten months into working on the show, Kennelly and Lloyd were told that their contracts would not be renewed. Their departure was publicised in the 29 October 1988 issue of TV Week. David Brown reported that their characters would be permanently "rested" from the serial. Brown wrote that Kennelly and Lloyd's departure was part of a "major cast reshuffle" ahead of the show's return in 1989. Floss and Neville's exit story saw them decide to move to another caravan park in another town.

=== Returns ===
Kennelly reprised the role in 2000 for a guest role. In her return storyline, Floss arrives in Summer Bay to attend the wedding of Sally Fletcher (Kate Ritchie) and Kieran Fletcher (Spencer McLaren). The actress reprised the role in 2002, alongside various past cast members to celebrate summer bay's fictional "150 year anniversary". When she returns Floss reveals that she has continued to do tarot readings, following Neville's off-screen death. Unlike other returnees, Floss plays a centric part in the show's boat disaster storyline. To celebrate the town's birthday a boat trip is arranged and all local residents are invited. Ritchie who plays Sally told a reporter from Inside Soap that not everyone can board the ship and those left behind are soon thankful as the ship sinks. Prior to the disaster Floss predicts that something bad will happen to the town via her tarot readings. Ritchie added that "Floss has been fortune-telling, but no one pays any attention to her, but then the surf club partygoers find out that the boat has gone down with everyone on board!"

Kennelly returned to the series in 2004. Her reintroduction features her arriving in Summer Bay with the Carny theatre travelling circus. Alf Stewart (Ray Meagher) is not happy when the circus sets up in Summer Bay without a permit. He confronts them and is shocked to find Floss leading the company. Jade Sutherland (Kate Garven) later finds Floss cowering in pain but Floss asks her to keep in a secret. But it becomes apparent she is suffering from a serious illness.

== Storylines ==
Floss, along with her husband Neville, first appears in the Caravan Park when the Fletcher family arrive. Floss travels to the city meets her grandson Ben (Justin Rosniak) after lying to his nanny about her references and uses a false name "Mrs Neville". Ben, not knowing who Floss is rude to her at first but eventually softens towards her and she takes him to Summer Bay to meet his grandfather. When Ben discovers pictures of his father Scott (Peter Ford) in a photo album belonging to Floss and Neville, he wants to know the truth. Floss tells him and he reveals that Scott told them they were dead. Scott later turns up in Summer Bay and retrieves Ben much to the displeasure of him and his parents. Floss and Neville follow them back to the city and camp out on the front lawn until Scott agrees to let them see Ben. The police arrive and investigate a complaint made by Ben against Scott saying that he had hit him. After everything is cleared up, Scott orders Floss and Neville to leave but they don't want to. Ben threatens to run away when his grandparents are banished, so they lie to him, telling him they don't want to see him again. When Mother's Day approaches, Scott agrees to visit Floss and brings his wife Anna (Kate Turner), and Ben with him and the McPhees spend the day playing cricket on the beach.

Floss becomes obsessed after a Tarot reading reveals Bobby Simpson (Nicolle Dickson) will cause the death of one of the Fletchers and remembers the license plate when she begins dreaming of Frank Morgan's (Alex Papps) death in a car accident. Bobby destroys Frank's car after hearing this but the McPhees give Tom Fletcher (Roger Oakley), an anonymous cheque and he buys Frank a new car with an almost identical license plate. Frank has an accident on the day of his wedding while swerving to avoid Bobby but survives. In early 1989, Floss and Neville decide to leave the bay and join their old circus. They sneak away, not wanting a big fuss but their car breaks down and The Fletchers catch them just in time to say a proper goodbye.

Just over a decade later, Floss returns to the bay for Sally's ill-fated wedding to Kieran. She tells Sally that Neville died four years previous but lived a good life (the actor Frank Lloyd had died in 1995). In 2002, Summer Bay celebrates its 150th anniversary and Floss predicts the Mirgini disaster after warning Shelley Sutherland (Paula Forrest) against wearing red. Shelly and her daughter, Kirsty (Christie Hayes) are lost at sea for several days. When they are eventually rescued, Floss leaves.

Floss returns in 2004 with the travelling circus and reveals to Sally that she is dying of cancer and wants her and her husband Flynn Saunders (Joel McIlroy) to help euthanize her. However, Floss receives news that she is not dying after all. Four years later on the eve of Sally's departure, Floss has a vision of Aden Jefferies (Todd Lasance) in trouble. Aden is found in the crumbling wreck of the collapsing Beachside Diner and safely rushed to hospital. Floss later attends Sally's tribute night at the school before setting off again.

== Reception ==
Kennelly received a fan letter from a viewer in Queensland who had read she lived on a farm in the Hunter Region. The letter arrived in less than a week. Floss and her husband Neville were described by Lucy Clark writing for Sydney Morning Herald as "a funny old pair". Her colleague, Robin Oliver branded the pair as "a couple of loveable charlatans." Jason Herbison from All About Soap described Floss stating "you'll have to think very far back to recall Floss - she used to occupy a caravan with her husband Neville."
