= Home and Away: Hearts Divided =

- DVD Cover for Hearts Divided
- Starring: Tammin Sursok; Rebecca Cartwright; Christie Hayes; Kate Garven; Beau Brady; Kip Gamblin
- No. of episodes: 3

Release
- Original network: Seven

Home and Away: Hearts Divided is a direct-to-video special of Australian soap opera Home and Away. It was released on 29 October 2003 and is hosted by Home and Away star Rebecca Cartwright. It contains two episodes that aired on TV: "Turn Back the Night" and "Fallout", from the sixteenth season of Home and Away, plus the exclusive episode, Hearts Divided, which will not be aired on TV. It was released in the same format as Secrets and the City, with two aired TV episodes and the special and again follows another terrible situation that the Sutherland family have to face. Kane Phillips, the man who raped Dani Sutherland has returned to Summer Bay and comes between Dani and her sister Kirsty.

== Episodes ==
The first two episodes featured, titled "Turn Back the Night" and "Fallout" for the DVD release, are from the show's sixteenth season.

No. overall	No. in season	Title	Directed by	Written by	Original release date
3601	181	"Turn Back the Night"	Mark Piper	Coral Drouyn	22 September 2003
On a rainy night an upset Dani hits something while driving, she finds some blood on the car but thinks it was only an animal. In a flashback it is revealed how high the tension is in the Sutherland household as Kane Philipps has returned to the bay. Dani later kisses her college professor, Ross and drives off and it was revealed that it was actually Kane she hit on the rainy night.
3606	186	"Fallout"	Mark Piper	Coral Drouyn	29 September 2003
Dani worries about being found guilty in court and Hayley tries to persuade her to tell the police the reason why she was distracted while driving. Kirsty finds out that Kane has been moved to a hospital in the city. Dani tells Scott about the kiss with Ross.
–	–	"Hearts Divided"	Mark Piper	Coral Drouyn	N/A
Kirsty heads to the city to visit Kane in hospital, but the bus breaks down and she accepts a lift from a man who tries to rape her. She manages to fight him off and steal his car. Rhys and Shelly look for Kirsty as they can't get in touch with her. Kirsty dumps the car as the police chase her and finally gets to the hospital and when Rhys eventually finds her at the hospital he tries to drag her out. Dani misses Scott after and is worried that he hates her.

== Cast ==
=== Main cast ===
- Tammin Sursok – Dani Sutherland
- Rebecca Cartwright – Hayley Smith
- Christie Hayes – Kirsty Sutherland
- Kate Garven – Jade Sutherland
- Beau Brady – Noah Lawson
- Kip Gamblin – Scott Hunter
- Michael Beckley – Rhys Sutherland
- Ray Meagher – Alf Stewart
- Kate Ritchie – Sally Fletcher
- Mitch Firth – Seb Miller
- Ben Unwin – Jesse McGregor
- Joel McIlroy – Flynn Saunders
- Danny Raco – Alex Poulos
- Sebastian Elmaloglou – Max Sutherland

=== Guest cast ===
- Paula Forrest – Shelley Sutherland
- Sam Atwell – Kane Phillips
- Sophie Luck – Tamara Simpson
- Hollie Andrew – Mira Sadelic
- Angelo D'Angelo – Ross McLuhan
- Kim Hillas – Betty (woman on bus)
- Alan Dukes – Bill
- Kaja Trøa – Tracey (woman in car) (credited as Kaja Troa)
- Luke Stephens – The Man
- Rodney Power – Dr. Andrews (credited as Rod Power)
- Brigit Wolf – Nurse
- Robert Baxter – Bus Driver (credited as Rob Baxter)
- Scott McLean – Policeman #1
- Scott Parmeter – Policeman #2

== DVD ==
Home And Away: Hearts Divided
Set Details	Special Features
3 episodes; 1 disc; 1.78:1 aspect ratio; 89 minutes; Languages: English Dolby Digital 2.0; English Dolby Digital Stereo	"Previously in Summer Bay" with introduction by Rebecca Cartwright; Featurettes: Behind the Scenes; A Day in the Life of Bec and Beau; Credits; Music Video: Emmanuel Carella – "Don't Say a Word"
Release Dates	"Previously in Summer Bay" with introduction by Rebecca Cartwright; Featurettes: Behind the Scenes; A Day in the Life of Bec and Beau; Credits; Music Video: Emmanuel Carella – "Don't Say a Word"
Region 4	"Previously in Summer Bay" with introduction by Rebecca Cartwright; Featurettes: Behind the Scenes; A Day in the Life of Bec and Beau; Credits; Music Video: Emmanuel Carella – "Don't Say a Word"
29 October 2003	"Previously in Summer Bay" with introduction by Rebecca Cartwright; Featurettes: Behind the Scenes; A Day in the Life of Bec and Beau; Credits; Music Video: Emmanuel Carella – "Don't Say a Word"

== Reception ==
As Secrets and the City, many fans were disappointed with the release of Hearts Divided, for the same reasons as the first release, two episode already having aired on TV and a special that was not much longer than the prior episodes. There was also the fact that the release was rated PG, while the television airings for the first two episode where G-rated, but it did not seem anymore adult themed, as G is only the television rating and the show would receive a PG or even an M rating anyway, although fans were hoping for an M rating, the release did take advantage of the more extreme PG rating. The DVD release was not very big on extras as it featured short behind-the-scenes footage, A Day in the Life of Bec and Beau which was featured on the previous release and Emmanuel Carella's music video "Don't Say a Word".

== Book ==
Home and Away: Hearts Divided – The Book
- Book cover for Hearts Divided
- Author: Leon F. Saunders
- Language: English
- Genre: Drama
- Publisher: Pan Australia
- Publication date: 1 November 2003
- Publication place: Australia
- Media type: Print
- Pages: 180
- ISBN: 0-330-36461-8

Book based on the Home and Away episode Hearts Divided

There's turmoil in Summer Bay and Rhys Sutherland and his family are right in the middle of it. Kirsty and Dani were loyal, loving sisters. Fiercely, unconditionally proud of each other – until the dark influence of Kane Phillips pervaded their lives in ways that no one ever imagined. Now Dani is accused of trying to kill the man who ruined her life two years ago, while Kirsty is leaving Summer Bay to be by his side. But Kirsty's journey away from her family takes her into uncharted waters and unexpected dangers.

The book was written in by Leon F. Saunders and released in 2003.

== See also ==
- Home and Away
- Home and Away: Secrets and the City
- Home and Away: Romances
- Home and Away: Weddings
