= Bobby Simpson (Home and Away) =

Fictional character

- Home and Away character
- Portrayed by: Nicolle Dickson
- Duration: 1988–1993, 1995
- First appearance: 17 January 1988
- Last appearance: 9 June 1995
- Introduced by: Alan Bateman (1988); John Holmes (1995)
- Book appearances: The Bobby Simpson story Bobby and Frank; Scandal at Summer Bay
In-universe information
- Other names: Bobby Morgan; Bobby Marshall
- Occupation: Student (1988); Co-owner of the Bayside Diner (1989–1993)
- Father: Donald Fisher
- Mother: Morag Bellingham
- Adoptive father: Al Simpson
- Adoptive mother: Doris Simpson
- Stepmother: Barbara Stewart
- Sisters: Sophie Simpson (adoptive); Charlie Buckton (step)
- Half-brothers: Alan Fisher; Byron Fisher
- Half-sisters: Rebecca Nash
- Husband: Frank Morgan (1989–1990); Greg Marshall (1992–1993)
- Adoptive sons: Sam Marshall
- Grandfathers: Gordon Stewart
- Grandmothers: Isobel DuPre; Sarah-Jane Stewart
- Uncles: Clive Fisher; Alf Stewart
- Aunts: Celia Stewart; Barbara Stewart; Colleen Smart; Debra Stewart; Mary Croft
- Nephews: Seb Miller David Simpson (adoptive)
- Nieces: Tamara Simpson (adoptive)
- First cousins: David Croft; Lucinda Croft; Lance Smart; Maureen Evans; Owen Dalby; Roo Stewart; Quinn Jackson; Duncan Stewart
- Other relatives: Martha MacKenzie; Ric Dalby; Bryce Stewart

Bobby Marshall (also Simpson and Morgan) is a fictional character from the Australian Channel Seven soap opera Home and Away, played by Nicolle Dickson. She was introduced in the pilot episode by executive producer Alan Bateman. Nearly four hundred actresses auditioned to play Bobby, with Dickson taking the role. Bobby is described as a trouble-making teen who is rebellious and a loner. Bobby became a popular character because of her confronting attitude. Bobby's story lines have focused on finding her biological parents, her feud with Roo Stewart, adoption and her marriage to foster brother Frank Morgan. Bobby's marriage to Frank was only implemented when script writers were sure viewers approved of it. At certain points in Bobby's duration, Dickson disapproved of her actions, for instance she became frustrated with her because she decided to find her biological parents without thinking about her foster parents' feelings. Dickson decided to leave the serial in 1993, and the character was killed off in a boat accident. In 1995 Dickson made a cameo appearance when Ailsa Stewart has hallucinations of Bobby in her fridge door. Dickson has received a Logie Award for her portrayal of Bobby and she has been referred to as a "Summer Bay icon".

== Casting ==
Nearly four hundred actresses auditioned for the role of Bobby, compared to the three hundred hopefuls that auditioned for the roles of the other foster children, with actress Nicolle Dickson receiving the role of Bobby. Dickson was eighteen when she was cast and had nearly decided to quit acting in favour of a "normal career".

Initially Dickson found the role hard to adjust to because she never got to see her friends any more and has stated she found it odd that the serial's production staff were having her transported around on first-class flights and in limousines. The fame also took Dickson by surprise, whilst interviewed by newspaper Evening Times she stated: "I'm just an ordinary teenage girl but my life changed completely almost over-night. When I started playing the role of Bobby I had no idea of the effect it was going to have." Dickson has also revealed that fans are scared to talk to her because they assume she will act like Bobby, stating: "I sometimes think people are scared to talk to me, because I might bite their head off. But I'd much rather just have a chat." In 1991, it was revealed that Dickson has signed another years contract to stay with Home and Away but said she was "nervous" about doing so. After Dickson's exit the remaining older cast members were offered pay rises because Seven feared they would follow her decision to quit.

== Character development ==
"Part of Bobby's popularity is because she does all the things other people wish they were brave enough to do"

— Dickson describing Bobby's popular rebellious persona. (1990)

The serial's writers of 1989 stated that: "Bobby Simpson is Summer Bay's premiere juvenile delinquent - the product of sixteen years of emotional rejection by her parents, and later, grandparents." They also brand her a loner, streetwise and describe her attitude in her early years stating: "If she liked you she'd do anything for you, if she had an anti against you she was a little demon who'd only stop short of crime in her actions towards you." Further describing these traits Dickson adds: "She'll stick by you to the end, but then she can turn around and stick her fingers up at you if she doesn't like you. I think a lot of people can relate to the way Bobby is. [...] I enjoy playing her, I think she's really sweet because she puts on this tough exterior and yet inside she's longing for somebody. Bobby has little control over the others." Dickson also believes that Bobby's popularity stems from the fact she does the things people in real life wish they could do but are not brave enough to. Dickson has also described why Bobby hides behind a tough exterior stating she is so aggressive because she is hurt inside. In the Home and Away Annual for 1989 Kesta Desmond writes that she is a loner, a juvenile delinquent, a rebel and forthright. In the book Home and Away Special she is described as: "Bobby is a loner, she has very few friends, only the tearaways of the town, and claims to need nobody." Describing the similarities between character and actress Dickson adds: "I think I'm more independent and mature. She is afraid to trust anyone, but I love affection."

One of Bobby's storylines saw her try and track down her real father, the plot was unpopular with Dickson who stated: "When Bobby turned her back on her foster parents to go off and look for her real father, I just became totally frustrated with her." Another storyline was her relationship with foster brother Frank Morgan (Alex Papps), they get together after Roo Stewart (Justine Clarke) leaves him on their wedding day. Dickson describes the fan reaction stating: "They're all on Bobby's side, and clearly not Roo's!" On-screen Bobby is constantly worried that she is a substitute for Roo, of this Dickson states: "The character of Bobby has always felt intimidated by Roo because she's so beautiful and sexy. She knows Frank has always fancied Roo and can't help suspecting that he's marrying Bobby on the rebound". Papps said that Bobby "still had a lot of attitude" but by then she had "softened a lot." Dickson had to film many scenes around this time which involved Bobby crying with worry, she stated she found the scenes easy to prepare for. When script writers initially planned Bobby and Frank's wedding, but they were unsure how viewers would react to it. Dickson and Papps were sent on a publicity stunt to find out what the public reaction would be to the proposed marriage. They stood in a crowded shopping centre and hugged each other, which got the crowds attention as they cheered, Papps then shouted: "Let's have a scream from those who want Bobby and Frank to marry". The crowd heavily approved and all voiced their approval. Delighted producers gave the marriage the green light and they married. Dickson later stated: "Everyone wanted to sort of see them finally get together because Bobby was keen on him for such a long time." Concluding that their marriage served as relief to everyone because Bobby finally got her happy ending. In 1990, Bobby discovers she is pregnant. Though in the 1991 series return episode, Bobby is told she has miscarried her unborn baby. Dickson said the scenes were "very harrowing". Bobby tries "to keep calm" throughout her ordeal.

In a March 1995, a TV Week reporter revealed that Dickson had reprised the role of Bobby. While her character was killed off, Bobby would return in scenes to coincide with a planned mental breakdown for the character of Ailsa Hogan (Judy Nunn).

== Storylines ==
=== Backstory ===
Bobby was born in Summer Bay as the illegitimate daughter of Morag Bellingham (Cornelia Frances) and Donald Fisher (Norman Coburn). Morag kept the pregnancy a secret. She was adopted by Doris and Al Simpson (George Leppard; Terence Donovan), who she moved with to the city when she was two years old. Al was a violent alcoholic was imprisoned seven years for petty crime. Meanwhile, Doris and Bobby returned to Summer Bay to stay with her grandparents. By this point, Bobby had begun rebelling and earned a reputation as a wild child. When she was fifteen, her mother Doris died of cancer, and her grandparents sold their store to Ailsa. Alf Stewart (Ray Meagher) soon felt sympathy for her and got her a job at the store and allowed her to live behind his boatshed, she resented Alf being an authority figure to her but slowly warmed to Ailsa.

=== 1988–1995 ===
Tom (Roger Oakley) and Pippa Fletcher (Vanessa Downing) arrive with their foster children to take a look at the caravan park, Bobby is hiding in one in of the vans with the help of Neville (Frank Lloyd) and Floss McPhee (Sheila Kennelly), after being accused of breaking into Donald Fisher's house. Neville and Floss try to keep her away from Alf and the Fletchers, as they do not want any more trouble. Bobby sees Sally Fletcher (Kate Ritchie) snooping, Bobby tries to make an escape but knocks over little Sally in the process. Bobby tries to get Sally to keep quiet and runs off. She is later caught by Tom and Frank when Sally identifies the girl who pushed her, and is placed under citizens arrest by Mr Fisher, who has been searching for her due to his suspicions about her robbing him. She is then handed over to the police.

Bobby decides to harass the Fletcher girls at the beach and blames their family for her earlier arrest. The night the Fletchers move into the caravan park house, one of the vans burst into flames. The blame is immediately pointed at Bobby, but she is adamant she has done anything wrong. Mr Fisher tries to have her arrested again as he wants to see justice, but Tom and Pippa refuse to press charges as they believe Bobby is innocent. Pippa starts to feel sorry for Bobby and offers her a chance to live in one of the caravans free of charge, which Bobby refuses, as she does not want to be seen as anyone's charity case. However, Steven Matheson (Adam Willits), comes to her defence when she is harassed by Lance Smart (Peter Vroom) and Martin Dibble (Craig Thomson) on the beach. Bobby soon befriends Steven and as a result she decides to accept Pippa's offer. But Carly Morris (Sharyn Hodgson), objects to Bobby staying in the caravan park and a fight breaks out between them just as a man from community services stops by to assess the Fletchers living arrangements. Bobby feels guilty that she might be responsible for splitting the family up, so she goes to the city to convince Tarquin Pearce (John O'Brien), the man from the department not to take the kids away from Tom and Pippa.

Pearce is so impressed with what Bobby told him, he not only wants the Fletchers to stay together, he also persuades Tom and Pippa to take on Bobby as their sixth foster child. She later moves in with them and quickly settles in and becomes a part of the family. Now reformed and living in a stable home, Bobby and Ailsa decide to set up a new business, The Bayside Diner. She also develops feelings for her foster brother Frank, but he is in love with Roo. Bobby and Roo clash on many occasions, whilst Bobby is secretly jealous. Bobby evens starts dreaming she is marrying Frank and rubbing it in Roo's face. Bobby is delighted when Roo and Frank seem to be having a rough time. Frank and Roo however then agree to get married, which makes Bobby even more angry. On the day of their wedding, Roo starts having second thoughts. Frank is devastated to find out Roo has jilted him. Bobby decides she will be there for Frank in his time of need.

After a while, their friendship starts developing into feelings. Frank decides they have to make a move and they start a relationship of their own. Bobby constantly worries however that he is on the rebound; this makes her cry a lot and let her usual strong image fade. Frank decides to show his commitment to Bobby and asks her to marry him. Delighted, Bobby accepts the offer. On the day of their wedding, Bobby's birth mother Morag secretly turns up to the wedding; at this point, Bobby still is not aware of the identity of her biological parents. Their marriage starts to face problems and Bobby refuses to let go of the thought he is on the rebound. So after constant disagreements, Frank decides to leave Summer Bay for New York City to reconcile with Roo. Bobby is distraught to realise she was right all along.

She attempts to trace her birth parents, without giving a thought for her foster parents' feelings. After a series of hurdles, Bobby decides she has tried hard enough and gives up. Morag is admitted to hospital and Alf decides to tell Bobby his secret because he feels the timing is appropriate. Bobby is shocked at the secret because it means Morag was in fact her mother. Bobby is very angry when she finds out the truth and continues to pester Morag even after she is released from hospital. After a while, she gives in and reveals all to her. Bobby is more upset to find out Donald is her father because they have previously hated each other. Initially neither can handle the situation, but eventually the two decide to put their past differences aside and develop a close father-daughter relationship. When she discovers she is pregnant, she tells everyone but Donald; she tries to but is scared of what he will think. He is annoyed when he finds out and Bobby thinks he disapproves, but Donald tells her he is proud of her. At one point, Donald resigns from his job because of problems at the school so she enlists Pippa and Grant Mitchell's (Craig McLachlan) help to get his job back. After coming to terms with the prospect of being a mother, Bobby develops stomach pains and is devastated to find out she has suffered a miscarriage. When she gets her head together, she decides to take a leaf out of Pippa's book and looks into the prospect of fostering a child of her own.

After a series of hits and misses, she wonders if it is the right thing to do. However, this all changes when she finds a young boy named Sam Nicholls (Ryan Clark). The two get on really well in the end and form a close relationship. Bobby and Sam's delight is soon put to an end when his biological father, Greg Marshall (Ross Newton), turns up in Summer Bay; after finding out their address from someone, he turns up and announces he is here to take Sam back home. Bobby is terrified at the thought of losing Sam, and she refuses to let Greg near him. Eventually, Bobby and Greg become close and start a relationship and they marry, much to the happiness of Sam.

When a fair is held, Bobby's friend Adam Cameron (Mat Stevenson) wants to go for a boat ride with her and Luke Cunningham (John Adam). Suddenly, the boat collides with a large piece of driftwood in the water and overturns, throwing everyone out of the boat and into the water. Bobby is then found but is in a coma. Attempts are made to save her but she is found to be brain dead. After a few days, Bobby's friends and family each say their goodbyes to her, before the decision is made by Greg to turn off her life support machine. The whole town is affected by her death. Even her estranged mother Morag finds it hard to come to terms with it. Adam is not charged with causing her death (instead he is charged with culpable navigation), but despite it being accidental, he is still treated like an outcast as he becomes hated by most of the Bay's residents and he is only forgiven after he saves Sam from a fire. He leaves soon after. When Ailsa is going through a rough time in 1995, she starts hallucinating due to the medication she is prescribed. One night, Ailsa hallucinates and Bobby's ghost suddenly appears before her on the fridge door, telling Ailsa that Alf cares about her.

== Reception ==
Dickson won the Logie for "Most Popular New Talent" at the 1989 Logie Awards for her portrayal of Bobby. At the 1991 Logie Awards, Dickson was nominated in the category of "Most Popular Actress". In his book, Super Aussie Soaps, Andrew Mercado describes Bobby as the serial's "breakout star" both on and off-screen, also branding her as extremely rebellious. Bobby has been received negatively by the editors of Australian weekly magazine The Bulletin stating: "From memory, Bobby whinged and whined a lot before Dickson left the show for anonymity." Televisionau.com also brand Bobby as rebellious but state she's also an outsider compared to the other foster children. Darren Rowe of entertainment website Digital Spy refers to both character and actress as an icon of the serial. Eamonn McCusker writing for The Digital Fix attributes the origins of cheap television to Bobby's infamous beach scene in which she first says "Rack Off!". Dickson has revealed that she received high volumes of fan mail every time Bobby punched another character, an amount she stated: "became time consuming". Murray Clifford writing for the Evening Times brands her as the serial's "tearaway tomboy". A columnist for Inside Soap said that Bobby was a "tearaway" who eventually became the "pillar of the community". Discussing Bobby and Frank, a reporter from Soap World wrote "this torturous, star-crossed path to the altar and back broke H&A fans' hearts." Inside Soap ran a feature compiling "The 100 greatest soap stories ever told". They featured the story about Bobby discovering her parents true identity as their 52nd choice.
