= Home and Away: Romances =

- DVD Cover for Romances

Release
- Original network: Seven

Home and Away: Romances is an exclusive-to-DVD special of Australia's most popular soap Home and Away. It was released on 2 November 2005 and unlike it previous two DVD releases, Secrets and the City and Hearts Divided which only contained three episodes each, this release is completely different, this takes a look back at all the classic Home and Away relationships over the past 17 years of the show from 1988 to 2005. It is hosted by Home and Away star Beau Brady and has everything from first meetings to good and bad dates, first kisses to love triangles and proposals to happy endings. The DVD also contains the movie length pilot episode, which is a rare chance for fans to go back to where it all began.

== Romances ==
=== Boy Meets Girl ===
==== 1991 - Julie and Sophie meets Nick and David respectively ====
Julie met with a local police officer whose name was Nick Parrish. Subsequent upon that, in that same year, Sophie met David when she and Sally were trying to rescue a cockatoo.

==== 1993 - Angel meets Shane ====
There came a misunderstanding between in 1993 between Angel and Shane as she (Angel) ran up on Shane and accused him of wanting just one thing.

==== 1996 - Shannon meets Geoff ====
While it was proceeding, another bitter moment happened in 1996 when Shannon met Geoff at the surf club and Curtis to accuse her of peevish on him.

==== 1997 - Sally meets Scott ====
Sally met Scott Irwin later during 1997 in the Surf Club requesting she play a game of pool with him.

==== 2000 - Hayley and Leah meets Noah and Vinnie respectively ====
In 2000, Hayley met Noah in the club when she was about to be attacked by some boys, warning her off the boys who gave her the wrong kind of attention. It was during this period, he saved her before the gang of boys run up on her outside.

Another meeting that took place in 2000 was Leah meeting Vinnie when she ran away from her wedding, then picked her up by the roadside and took her to a bay.

==== 2002 - Kirsty meets Dylan ====
While Kirsty and Dylan Russell were in school, they bumped into each other.

==== 2003 - Dani and Tasha meets Scott and Robbie respectively ====
It was in 2003, Dani and Scott met when he showed up in the beach riding a white horse. Subsequent upon that, Tasha met Robbie when he showed up at the bay, but she ignored him when he tried to introduce himself to her.

==== 2004 - Leah meets Dan ====
Leah met Dan Baker when he visited the hospital to check up on his brother, Peter who was attacked by Sarah Lewis.

=== On the Beach ===
==== 1988 - Carly meets Matt ====
When Carly had issues with the zip on his swim suit and needed help, he approached Matt and Lynn.

==== 1998 – Gypsy meets Vinnie ====
While Gypsy and Vinnie were both in the same beach at the same time, he came up to introduce himself to her.

==== 1998 – Terri meets Tom ====
Terri met Tom on the beach, they talked and ended up kissing.

==== 2004 – Cassie meets Ric ====
Cassie met Ric on the beach while he was sunbathing and they went skinny dipping, she tricked him and stole his clothes.

=== Bad Dates ===
==== 1997 – Shannon and Lachlan ====
When Shannon and Lachlan went on a date, while on a date, his car broke down, then it began to rain. On their second date that was on a boat, Lachan couldn't find the breaks.

==== 1999 – Gypsy and Jesse ====
Gypsy accidentally spilt wine on Jesse, while she was getting him some clean clothes, her parents returned to meet him half naked, so they assumed the worst.

==== 2002 – Kirsty and Kane ====
Kirsty and Kane took a boat out but when they spotted Alf, Kirsty jumped into the water. On a second date Sally and Flynn found them hiding in the back of a van.

==== 2004 – Leah and Dan ====
Dan asked Leah out, she assumed to wear something formal but he turned up wearing the opposite. It rained while they were in their picnic.

==== 2005 – Hayley and Kim ====
Hayley and Kim's date got to a bad start when the bottle of wine was smashed, so they got bitten by ants, the rain fell and their car broke down on their way home.

==== 2005 – Zoe and Kim ====
When Zoe and Kim went on a date, Zoe heard noises in the bushes, when Kim went to check out, Zoe got stabbed on the arm.

=== What a Night! ===
==== Dani and Josh ====
Dani went on a dinner with Josh in a caravan which he has decorated with candles and flowers.

==== Chloe and James ====
Chloe and James had dinner and dance on a date at the hospital.

==== Angel and Shane ====
Angel and Shane went on a date to the city to see ballet.

==== Hayley and Scott ====
Hayley and Scott went for a picnic. On a second date they had a much more formal picnic.

=== Pucker Up ===
According to Beau Brady there has been 3816 kisses in Home and Away (between 1988 and 2005). Sally had kissed many men on the show including Jack, Vinnie and Flynn, but her most memorable kissing seen as a kid was the spin the bottle game in the Fletcher house. Other first kisses include Angel and Shane, Tasha and Robbie, Hayley and Kim, Gypsy and Will, Martha and Jesse, Angie and Rhys, Jade and Seb, Josie and Jesse, Dani and Scott, Kirsty and Kane, Tamara and Max, Terri and Tom, Julie and Nick, Hayley and Josh, Brodie and Alex, Dani and Scott, Kirsty and Seb, Shauna and Jude, Leah and Dan, Irene and Paris, Zoe and Kim, Jade and Nick, and Hayley and Noah.

=== Second Base ===
- Hayley and Noah: Noah want to make plans to sleep with Hayley and tries to think of ways for his house mates not to bother them so leaves a plant pot at the bottom of the stairs.
- Zoe and Kim: Zoe tells Kim that this are going good between them and makes plans with hime to come round to her caravan.
- Tasha and Robbie: Robbie flips a coin and if it tails he and Tasha sleep together, and if it heads they wait.
- Hayley and Kim: Hayley and Kim begin to kiss and the next morning Hayley wakes to find them in bed together.
- Dani and Scott: On a date Dani and Josh sleep together
- Peta and Will: Peta and Will decide to take thing to the next level.
- Hayley and Scott: Hayley and Scott wake up in bed together.
- Leah and Dan: Leah and Dan begin to kiss on the sofa.
- Sally and Scott: Sally stays out all night with Scott and sneaks out of his car the next morning.

=== Sprung! ===
- Irene and Barry: Hayley and Kim catch Barry leaving Irene's room.
- Irene and Paris: Angie catches Irene and Paris kissing in a school classroom.
- Hayley and Scott: Sally catches Hayley and Scott kissing on her sofa.
- Carly and Ben: Carly and Ben are caught kissing in the Fletcher's kitchen.
- Jade and Nick: Kirsty catches Jade and Nick kissing.
- Shannon and Lachan: Sam catches Shannon and Lachlan kissing
- Chloe and Jesse: Marilyn catches Chloe and Jesse kissing
- Gypsy and Will: Gypsy and Will are caught kissing twice in two caravans.
- Tasha and Robbie: Tasha and Robbie are caught by strangers in the bush after sleeping together.
- Hayley and Kim: Hayley catches Kim naked in the bathroom.

=== Happy Ever After ===
- Pippa leaves with Ian: Pippa leaves the bay to start a new life with her husband Ian.
- Shannon leaves with Mandy: Shannon leaves the bay for Paris with her girlfriend Mandy
- Gypsy leaves with Will: Gypsy and Will leave the bay on a boat after their wedding.
- Rebecca leaves with Travis: Rebecca and Travis leave the bay on a cruise ship.

=== Yes or No? ===
- Steve proposes to Charlotte
- James proposes to Chloe
- Flynn proposes to Sally
- Tasha proposes to Robbie
- Ailsa proposes to Alf
- Lachan proposes to Shannon
- Shane proposes to Angel
- Travis proposes to Kelly
- Beth proposes to Rhys
- Will propose to Gypsy
- Ben proposes to Carly
- Jesse proposes to Kylie
- Don proposes to June
- Scott proposes to Hayley
- Jesse proposes to Leah
- Vinnie proposes to Leah
- Dan proposes to Leah

=== With This Ring... ===
clips of Home and Away's best ever weddings, which follows in Home and Away: Weddings.

== Interviews ==
- Kip Gamblin (Scott Hunter)
- Jason Smith (Robbie Hunter)
- Ada Nicodemou (Leah Patterson-Baker)
- Tim Campbell (Dan Baker)
- Kate Ritchie (Sally Fletcher)
- Rebecca Cartwright (Hayley Smith)
- Kimberley Cooper (Gypsy Nash)

== DVD ==
Home and Away: Romances
Set Details			Special Features
1 disc; 1.78:1 aspect ratio; 171 minutes; Language: English Dolby Digital 2.0			Original 1988 pilot episode
Release Dates			Original 1988 pilot episode
Region 1	Region 2	Region 4	Original 1988 pilot episode
TBA	5 February 2007	2 November 2005	Original 1988 pilot episode

Home and Away: Romances was the 18th most purchased DVD in Australian DVD, Blu-ray & VHS sales of 2005.

== See also ==
- Home and Away
- Home and Away: Secrets and the City
- Home and Away: Hearts Divided
- Home and Away: Weddings
