= RTÉ programme classifications =

Irish media content rating system

The RTÉ Programme Classification (known as the On Screen Classification) is a rating system for television programmes or films in Ireland. The system was introduced in November 2001 and issues viewers on RTÉ One and RTÉ Two, at the beginning of a programme (excluding news and sports), with a rating to indicate which age group the content is suitable for.

The System is an information service to television viewers, letting them know more about the content of scheduled programmes so that they can make informed decisions to view or not to view. Children's and young adult's programmes will be labeled as such. Programmes with explicit sex or violence is more suited to a mature audience, which will not merely be scheduled until after the 9pm watershed, but will be flagged on screen.

In March 2020, the on-screen classification system was removed on both channels due to the COVID-19 pandemic. In its place, on RTÉ One it reads "Stay At Home", and on RTÉ Two, in Irish, "Fan sa Bhaile". They eventually returned in October 2021 when both channels removed the Stay at Home messages.

== Current Classifications ==
- CH: Children

This is a programme or film that is aimed specifically at children, i.e. the pre-teenager or very young teenage audience. Examples of programmes issued this rating include Peppa Pig, HI-5, Barney & Friends, In the Night Garden.... (Equal to a G rating on DVD)

- GA: General audience

A programme that would be acceptable to all audiences and tastes. This may be or seem like a low rating, but in fact, some of the shows which receive this rating on TV, would actually receive a PG or a 12 certificate on DVD/Blu-ray. No programmes or films are edited or trimmed to fit the classification. Examples of programmes issued this rating include Sabrina the Teenage Witch, Neighbours, The Simpsons. Programmes with a GA rating are sometimes similar to a PS rating. Children's/family programmes such as Sabrina (above), will, in all cases, be GA (or Ch), but other GA (PS and YA) shows such as Neighbours and The Simpsons (above) will feature storylines with adult themes, in which case would revive the PG or 12 rating on DVD/Blu-ray. (Shows with this rating are usually equal to a PG/12 rating on DVD)

- PS: Parental supervision

A programme aimed at a mature audience, i.e. It might deal with adult themes, be moderately violent, frightening or contain an occasional swear word. And the classification label invites parents and guardians to consider restricting children's access. Examples of programmes issued this rating include Home and Away, Packed to the Rafters, Desperate Housewives, Brothers & Sisters. (Shows with this rating are usually equal to a 12/15 rating on DVD)

- MA: Mature audience

A typical 'post-watershed' programme which might contain scenes of sexual activity or violence, or the dialogue might be profane. Examples of programmes issued this rating include Shameless, Mrs. Brown's Boys, and very occasionally, episodes of Home and Away. (Shows with this rating are usually equal to a 15/18 rating on DVD)

=== Former classifications ===
- YA: Young adult

This would be a programme or film aimed at a teenage audience, which means it may contain adult or mature themes. That is to say that it would not be of great interest to an adult older than 18. However, it may deal with issues which affect the teenage audience, e.g. relationships, sexual activity, sexuality and drug use. Parents and guardians could expect that YA programmes or films might contain such material and may choose to limit their children's access. The YA rating has fallen much into disuse as the GA and PS ratings cover teen storylines in both television and film, GA and PS do cover such things that are not suitable for children. Examples of programmes issued this rating include Home and Away

== Dispute with IFCO ==
In November 2018, the Irish Film Classification Office (IFCO) director Ger Connolly formed a dispute with RTÉ over their refusal of issuing films that broadcast both channels with the official classification rating used for cinema and home video. RTÉ continued to use their own classification system and felt that as a free-to-air broadcaster, they cannot stop anyone from watching a film.

== See also ==
- Television content rating systems
- Motion picture rating system
- Irish Film Classification Office
