= Double Sculls =

- Written by: Chris Peacock
- Directed by: Iam Gilmour
- Starring: Chris Haywood; John Hargreaves; Angela Punch-McGregor; Bill Kerr
- Music by: Chris Neal
- Country of origin: Australia
- Original language: English

Production
- Producer: Richard Brennan
- Cinematography: Vince Monton
- Running time: 94 minutes
- Production companies: PBL Productions; Australian Film Commission

Original release
- Release: 1985

Double Sculls is a 1985 Australian TV movie about a man who tries to rehabilitate an alcoholic friend, directed by Ian Gilmore and produced by Richard Brennen. The film stars Chris Haywood.

== Cast ==
- Chris Haywood as Paul Weber
- John Hargreaves as Sam Larkin
- Angela Punch-McGregor as Edwina Larkin
- Bill Kerr
- Mercia Deane-Johns as Melanie Atkins
- Vanessa Downing as Sister Cathy
- Cecily Polson as Nursing sister
- Mercia Deane-Johns as Melanie Atkins
- Kelly Dingwall as Experimental subject #1
