= Home and Away =

Australian television soap opera (since 1988)

- Genre: Soap opera
- Created by: Alan Bateman
- Starring: Cast
- Theme music composer: Mike Perjanik
- Opening theme: "Home and Away"
- Ending theme: "Home and Away" (international broadcasts)
- Country of origin: Australia
- Original language: English
- No. of seasons: 39 (+ pilot TV film and 5 specials)
- No. of episodes: 8,849

Production
- Executive producers: John Holmes; Julie McGauran
- Producers: John Holmes (1988–1989); Andrew Howie (1989–1994); Russell Webb (1994–2001); Julie McGauran (2001–2007); Cameron Welsh (2007–2012); Lucy Addario (2012–present)
- Production location: Palm Beach, Sydney, New South Wales
- Camera setup: Video (1988–2003); HD video (filmised) (2003–present)
- Running time: 22 minutes
- Production companies: Seven Studios (formerly Seven Productions); Seven Network Operations Limited; Red Heart Entertainment; Kepper Media

Original release
- Network: Seven Network
- Release: 17 January 1988 – present

Related
- HeadLand

Home and Away (H&A) is an Australian television soap opera. It was created by Alan Bateman and commenced broadcast on the Seven Network on 17 January 1988. Bateman came up with the concept of the show during a trip to Kangaroo Point, New South Wales, where he noticed locals were complaining about the construction of a foster home and against the idea of foster children from the city living in the area. The soap opera was initially going to be called Refuge, but the name was changed to the "friendlier" title of Home and Away once production began.

The show premiered in what Bateman classified as a ninety-minute telefeature, as opposed to a pilot. Since then, each subsequent episode has aired for a duration of twenty-two minutes. Home and Away has become the second longest-running drama series in Australian television, after Neighbours. In Australia, it is currently broadcast from Mondays to Thursdays at 7:00 pm.

Home and Away follows the lives and loves of the residents in Summer Bay, a fictional seaside town in New South Wales. The series initially focused on the Fletcher family – Tom (Roger Oakley) and Pippa (Vanessa Downing), and their five foster children, Frank Morgan (Alex Papps), Carly Morris (Sharyn Hodgson), Lynn Davenport (Helena Bozich), Steven Matheson (Adam Willits) and Sally Fletcher (Kate Ritchie) – who moved from the city into the Summer Bay House, where they assumed the new job of running the caravan park, and eventually took in a sixth foster child, Bobby Simpson (Nicolle Dickson). Home and Away was not without controversy. During the first season alone, it featured several adult-themed storylines such as teen pregnancy, rape, drug and alcohol addiction, drug overdose and attempted suicide. The series has dealt with similar storylines over the years which have often exceeded its restricted time slot. Palm Beach in Sydney's Northern Beaches district has been used as the location for Summer Bay since 1988. The exterior scenes are filmed mainly at Palm Beach, while the interior scenes are filmed at the Australian Technology Park in Redfern.

Home and Away has been sold to over 140 countries around the world, making it one of Australia's most successful media exports. In the UK, it and fellow Australian soap opera Neighbours have been the most popular of the genre that are filmed internationally; Home and Away is broadcast on 5Star, which also previously aired Neighbours until it was initially cancelled in 2022 after the network declined to renew its contract for the programme (it was later revived by Amazon Freevee, in cooperation with domestic broadcaster Network 10). It is one of the highest-rating shows on RTÉ Television in Ireland (the same episode being shown twice per day: first in the early afternoon on RTÉ 1 and second in the early evening on RTÉ 2), and TVNZ 2 in New Zealand. In Australia, Home and Away is the most awarded program at the Logie Awards, with a total of 51 wins, including Most Popular Drama Program. Some cast members have won several other awards such as the Gold Logie for Most Popular Personality on Australian Television, Silver Logie for Most Popular Actor, and Most Popular Actress. In 2015, Home and Away was inducted into the Logie Hall of Fame.

== Production ==
=== Conception ===
After the Seven Network cancelled their soap opera Neighbours on 12 July 1985 due to low ratings, rival Network 10 picked it up and turned it into a success. A couple of years later, Seven's head of drama, Alan Bateman, became desperate to get back into the soap market and began to work out how to launch another soap that was not a copy of Neighbours. While on a trip to Kangaroo Point, New South Wales with his family, Bateman began talking to locals who were "up in arms" over the construction of a foster home for children from the city. Seeing the degree of conflict the "influx of parentless children on a tight-knit community" was having, Bateman came away with the idea for a new serial. He explained "Nobody in the community wanted them to move in and I began to wonder how streetwise city kids would adapt to the new lifestyle. Suddenly I thought, there is my slice of life in a community." Bateman began outlining the storyline and set the serial in the fictional town of Summer Bay. While Seven Network executives were unconvinced by the idea, audience research was positive. The soap opera was initially called Refuge, but the name was changed to the "friendlier" title of Home and Away once production began. The show premiered in what Bateman classified as a ninety-minute telefeature (subsequently in re-runs and on VHS titled as Home and Away: The Movie), as opposed to a pilot. Since then, each subsequent episode has aired for a duration of twenty-two minutes.

Home and Away has since become the second-longest drama series in Australian television after Neighbours. In 2002, several former characters such as Frank Morgan (Alex Papps), Carly Morris (Sharyn Hodgson), Steven Matheson (Adam Willits), Blake Dean (Les Hill) and Sophie Simpson (Rebekah Elmaloglou) returned for a special storyline to mark the 150th anniversary of settlement in Summer Bay. The storyline featured a majority of the cast boarded onto a ferry boat for a night cruise; however, a massive storm ruined the celebrations, leading the boat to sink. In July 2005, Home and Away celebrated its 4000th episode, which saw many former cast members return for Alf Stewart's (Ray Meagher) surprise 60th birthday party. In March 2007, the commercial television industry's Annual Code Complaint Report revealed that Home and Away was the eighth most complained about show on Australian television, and the only drama series in the top ten complaint list. From 1 July 2005 to 30 June 2006, there were 23 written complaints about the show as viewers thought it was inappropriate for it to be shown in its 7:00 pm timeslot.

Home and Away celebrated its 21st year in production in Sydney on 23 July 2009. The mayor of Sydney's Pittwater Council presented cast members with the key to Palm Beach, the exteriors setting filming location for the show. At the end of 2011, Cameron Welsh left his role as the series producer. Welsh previously played the character Mitch McColl from 1999 until 2001 and then became the series producer for Home and Away in 2007. Former All Saints producer Lucy Addario took over as series producer in January 2012. In August 2012, Home and Away's official Australian Facebook page reached one million likes, becoming the first Australian television show to reach this milestone. The Facebook page was established in November 2009 and is followed by fans mostly in Australia, Ireland, New Zealand, Norway and the United Kingdom. In 2013, Home and Away celebrated its 25th anniversary and former cast member Kate Ritchie (Sally Fletcher) returned for a special storyline to coincide with the celebrations. For the first time in the show's history, Home and Away aired a two-hander, Episode 6361, featuring the characters Ricky Sharpe (Bonnie Sveen) and Darryl "Brax" Braxton (Steve Peacocke), on 15 February 2016.

=== Location and sets ===
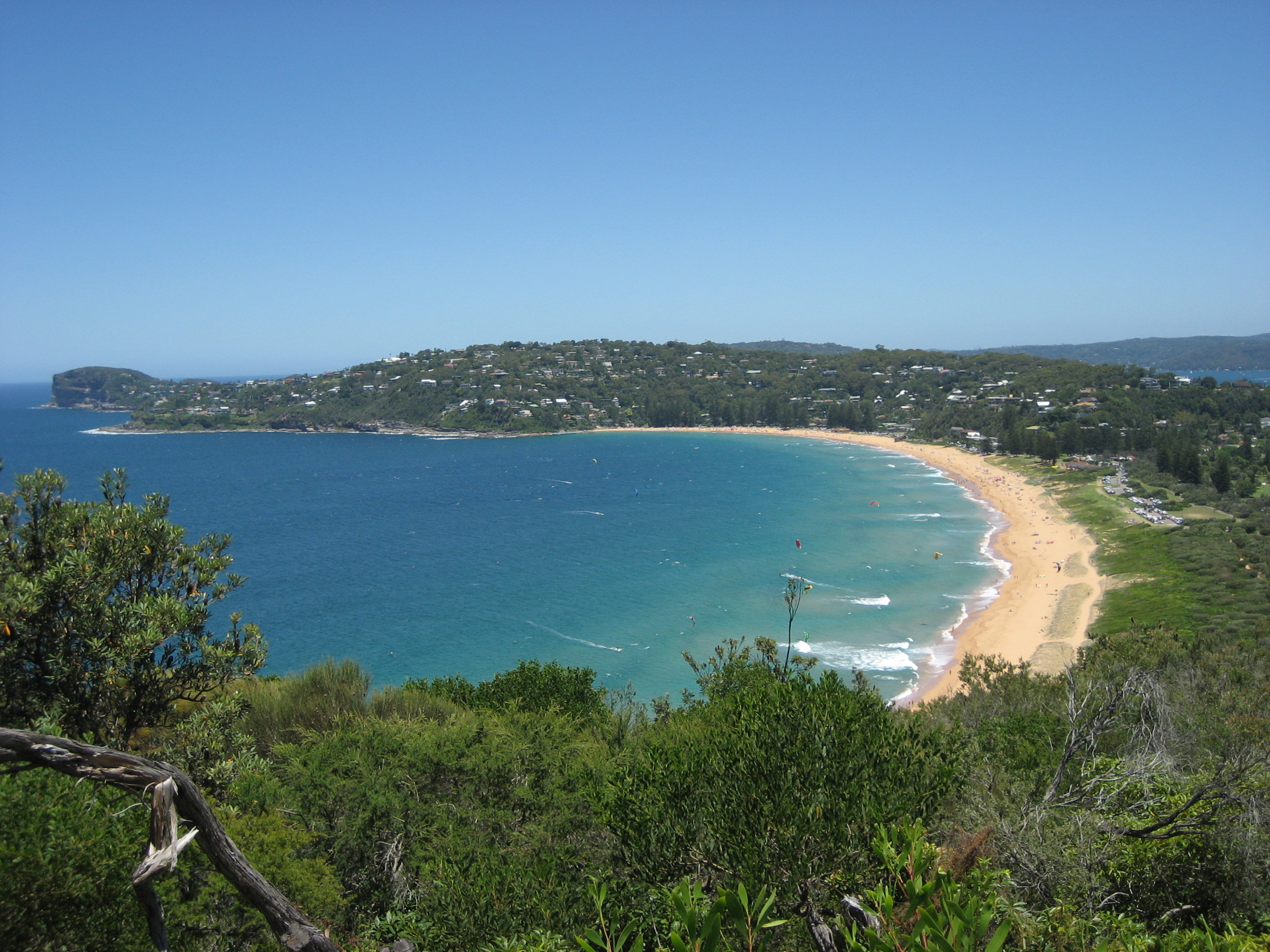
Palm Beach in Sydney's Northern Beaches district has been used to represent Summer Bay since Home and Away began in 1988.

Home and Away is set in Summer Bay, a fictional seaside town in New South Wales. Locations within the town include the beach, a high school, diner, bait shop, garage and a surf club, which includes a gym, small kiosk and an upstairs restaurant. Characters in the show live at surrounding neighbouring areas such as the Summer Bay House, Summer Bay Caravan Park, Beach House, The Farmhouse, Pier flat, and Saxon Avenue. Other fictional towns mentioned and sometimes seen in Home and Away are Mangrove River and Yabbie Creek.

Palm Beach in Sydney's Northern Beaches district has been used as the location for Summer Bay since Home and Away began in 1988. It has since become popular with tourists, and tours to the show's exterior sets at Palm Beach run throughout the year. The exterior scenes are filmed mainly at Palm Beach and at Fisherman's Beach in Collaroy. Interior scenes for the show were filmed at the Seven Network's Sydney studios in Epping until 2010. Following the closure of these studios in early 2010, the interiors are now filmed at the Australian Technology Park in Redfern. The Jackeroo Ranch estate in Kenthurst had been used for the exterior sets of the Summer Bay House and Caravan Park since 1988. After both sets were destroyed by a bushfire in December 2002, the caravan park set was moved and filmed at other locations such as the Waratah Park Earth Sanctuary between 2007 and 2009 and the Lane Cove River Tourist Park between 2010 and 2014. A replica of the Summer Bay House was rebuilt in its original location at the Kenthurst estate several years later, with the exception of a grey roof instead of a red one. The caravan park set moved back to the estate after the house was rebuilt, and both exterior sets made their on-screen returns in 2015. The Summer Bay House is the only house to still be seen on screen since the pilot episode.

Aside from New South Wales, Home and Away has also filmed scenes in other states of Australia. In May 2012, the show filmed scenes at Flinders Ranges and Nilpena Station in South Australia for a storyline in which Casey Braxton (Lincoln Younes) was kidnapped and taken to the outback by Kyle Braxton (Nic Westaway). The following month, Home and Away filmed scenes in Melbourne for the second time. In November 2014, the show filmed an episode at the Australian War Memorial in Canberra with several cast members, as a tribute to the Anzac Centenary. The episode centred around Alf Stewart (Ray Meagher), "who becomes upset with the younger generation's perceived lack of respect for Anzac Day, and joins the school trip to Canberra to visit the War Memorial." Outside of Australia, Home and Away has filmed in Hawaii once and in the UK three times.

=== Theme song ===
The theme song to Home and Away was written by Mike Perjanik. There have been nine different versions of the theme song used throughout the years. The lyrics remained the same since the show's inception, but a number of verses were gradually cut back over the years due to time restrictions. The original version was sung by Karen Boddington and Mark Williams, and was used from 1988 until mid-1995. Their version was released as a single in the UK in 1989 and peaked at number 73 on the UK Singles Chart. A new version performed by Doug Williams and Erana Clark debuted in 1995 and the opening theme was shortened in 1996; this version remained until 1999. From 2000 to 2003, the theme song to Home and Away was sung by The Robertson Brothers and it was the first version to use only male vocals. A 30-second updated version by The Robertson Brothers was used from 2004 to 2006. In January 2007, a new version was introduced and performed by Israel Cannan, who played the character Wazza in the show. After Cannan's version received many complaints from fans, the Seven Network decided to re-record the theme song in April 2007 with vocals provided by Luke Dolahenty. A shorter, 15-second version sung by Dolahenty and Tarryn Stokes debuted in 2009.

From 2010 until 2017, the Home and Away theme song was not used in the opening titles and was replaced by a short instrumental version. However, Dolahenty and Stokes' version was still used in the closing credits for international broadcasts. In 2018, two new eight-second versions of the theme song made a return to the opening titles after an eight-year absence. One version is sung by a male vocalist, while the other version is sung by a female vocalist; in the opening titles, both only sing the last two lines of the theme: "closer each day, Home and Away". An extended 30-second version by the male vocalist was uploaded onto the Home and Away website. In January 2025, Wade Sellers of TV Week confirmed that the theme song would return that year, but would not be featured in every episode.

=== Opening titles ===
The Home and Away opening titles sequence was initially used to introduce the regular characters in the show. The sequences often featured the characters in couple shots or with family and friends, and showed them in familiar settings around Summer Bay such as the beach. The titles for the show's earlier years featured black brush stroke cutouts around the character shots. 2004 saw Home and Away introduce new picture frame-style opening titles, with characters shown posing in and out of large picture frames in front of beach backgrounds. In January 2007, the show debuted new opening titles along with a new version of the theme song. The picture-frame style was still used, but this time the titles featured framed pictures of the characters. In 2009, the opening was reduced to 15 seconds and the characters were removed from the titles for the first time in Home and Away's history. They were replaced by a large photo collage showing various locations around Summer Bay. The decision to remove the cast and shorten the titles was due to time restrictions. Since then, many viewers in Australia and the United Kingdom have wanted the full-length title sequence with the cast to return.

From 2013 until 2017, Home and Away used a series of five-second opening titles, which changed every week. The various titles mostly featured scenes of bikini-clad women and shirtless men with surfboards at the beach. In 2018, a new series of eight-second titles were introduced along with the return of the show's theme song. The new titles, which currently change during each week, mostly feature two men or two women running down to the ocean for a surf. A 30-second version of the titles, not aired on Australian television, was released on the Home and Away website. The removal of the opening titles was unpopular with Home and Away fans who wanted them to return. In January 2025, Wade Sellers of TV Week confirmed that the opening titles would return that year following a seventeen year absence. The titles debuted on 6 February 2025 and featured the return of the show's characters in the sequences. The characters were seen posing on the show's familiar beach setting. Some of the cast shots had already been used previously in the show's promotional trailers. The sequence was designed to allow production to easily update the titles following cast departures and arrivals. The titles are only used for certain episodes due to creative reasons.

== Cast and characters ==
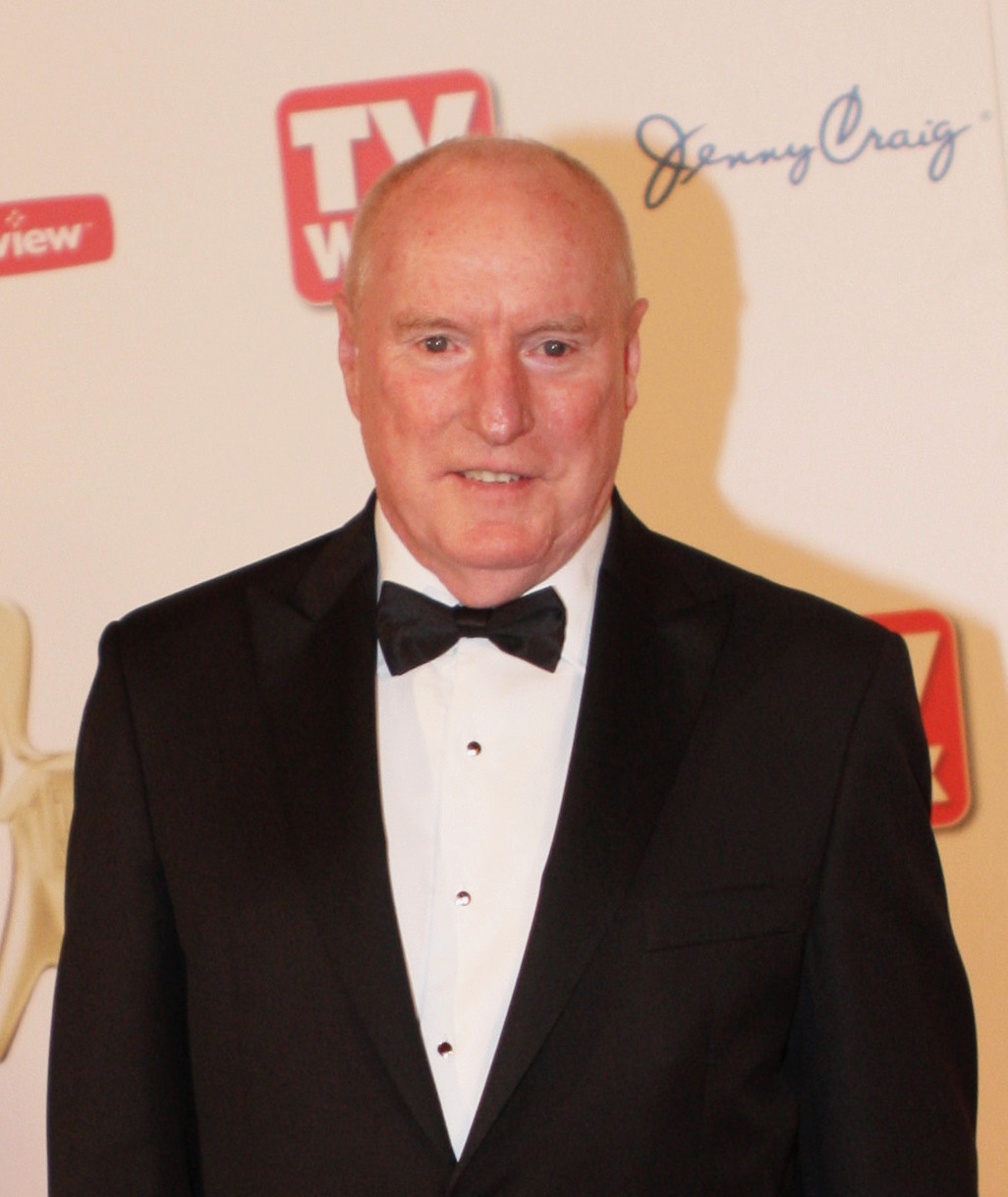
Ray Meagher (Alf Stewart) is currently the only remaining original cast member in Home and Away.

When Home and Away began in January 1988, it initially focused on the "Fletcher" family – Tom (Roger Oakley) and his wife Pippa (Vanessa Downing), and their five foster children, Frank Morgan (Alex Papps), Carly Morris (Sharyn Hodgson), Steven Matheson (Adam Willits), Lynn Davenport (Helena Bozich), and Sally Fletcher (Kate Ritchie) – who relocated from the city to live in the seaside town of Summer Bay. At the end of the first episode, Tom and Pippa take in their sixth foster child Bobby Simpson (Nicolle Dickson).

The Fletchers bought the Summer Bay Caravan Park and moved into the Summer Bay House. They quickly built strong friendships with the locals, shopkeepers Alf Stewart (Ray Meagher) and Ailsa Hogan (Judy Nunn) and retired carnival workers Neville (Frank Lloyd) and Floss McPhee (Sheila Kennelly), and town locals including surfer Matt Wilson (Greg Benson) and local yobbos Lance Smart and Martin Dibble, (Peter Vroom and Craig Thomson), whilst having a bitter rivalry with school headmaster Donald Fisher (Norman Coburn).

They were joined in the third episode by Alf Stewart's rebellious daughter Roo Stewart (Justine Clarke) and within the first month by his sister Celia Stewart (Fiona Spence), who portrayed a similar busybody role to what Gwen Plumb played as Doris Peters in the pilot.

While Home and Away features a mix of young cast members and older, more experienced actors, the show has always had a definite youth focus, with the younger characters dominating much of the storylines. Many of the cast have spent several years on Home and Away, including original cast member Judy Nunn who left the series in 2000 after 12 years playing the co-owner of Summer Bay's diner. Other original cast members Norman Coburn played high school principal Donald Fisher until 2003, and Kate Ritchie departed in 2008 after 20 years playing Sally Fletcher. Both Coburn and Ritchie along with Ray Meagher (Alf Stewart) entered the 2002 Guinness World Records as the longest-serving actors in an Australian drama series. Meagher now holds that record alone and he is the only remaining original cast member in the show. Meagher along with Ada Nicodemou (Leah Patterson-Baker) and Emily Symons (Marilyn Chambers) are the longest-serving cast members currently in Home and Away. In 2010, Georgie Parker joined the cast of Home and Away as Alf's daughter Roo Stewart, originally played by Justine Clarke in 1988–89. Alf and Roo are currently the only two original characters in the series.

=== Celebrity guest appearances ===
Throughout the years, Home and Away has featured several guest appearances from celebrities such as John Farnham, Johanna Griggs, Sia, Michael Palin, Ian Thorpe, Lleyton Hewitt, Paulini, Nick Grimshaw, Eliza Doolittle, Ed Sheeran, Jessica Mauboy, Atomic Kitten, and Sunrise presenters Matt Shirvington and Natalie Barr.

== Broadcasting ==
In Australia, Home and Away currently airs on the Seven Network at 7:00 pm from Mondays to Thursdays, going up against rival current affairs shows A Current Affair on the Nine Network, and The Project on Network Ten. The show is on air for approximately 45 weeks each year. Each season is usually broadcast from late January, and concludes with the season finale in late November (sometimes early February to early December), as it goes off air for two months during the Christmas and New Year period. It is typically commissioned at 230 episodes per season, but have sometimes commissioned less episodes in a season due to years where the Olympic games have aired on the Seven Network, putting the show into a mid-season break. All aired episodes shown during the week are available to watch on the Seven Network's 7plus app, as part of their catch up TV service. They are also broadcast in an omnibus edition each Sunday on Seven's digital multichannel 7Two.

When the show first began in 1988, it aired at 5:30 pm in Adelaide, at 6:00 pm in Melbourne and Sydney, at 6:30 pm in Brisbane, and at 7:00 pm in Perth. In January 1992, Seven moved Home and Away to the 7:00 pm timeslot across the network. On 3 November 2009, 7Two began airing repeat episodes of the show from the very beginning at 9:30 am, before moving to 9:00 am. Since its premiere, the show had been screened as a 22-minute episode each weeknight. However, beginning in March 2013, Better Homes and Gardens began replacing Home and Away on Fridays to make way for Seven's AFL coverage. Friday's episodes of Home and Away began airing on Thursdays at 7:30 pm. By 2018, the Home and Away schedule often varied from week to week. Some weeks saw four episodes aired, with Thursdays often featuring two or three episodes back-to-back.

Between 2000 and 2021, Home and Away ceased broadcast mid-season for two weeks during the Summer Olympic Games and the episode to screen prior to this is referred to as an 'Olympic cliffhanger'. An Olympic cliffhanger episode would usually involve increased drama, with the peak of a storyline, similar to a season finale episode, and the outcome of the cliffhanger to conclude after the Olympics. Olympic cliffhangers were broadcast in 2000, 2004, 2008 and 2016, with the exclusion of 2012, as the Seven Network did not have the rights to televise the 2012 Summer Olympics; the most recent one was in 2021 due to the 2020 Summer Olympics taking place in that year after being postponed in 2020. Since 2018, Home and Away has also taken transmission breaks in order to broadcast the 2018, 2022 and 2026 Commonwealth Games, held on the Gold Coast, in Birmingham and Glasgow respectively.

On 22 March 2020, Home and Away suspended production over the COVID-19 pandemic. Although it was initially stated that the show would continue filming, the decision was later made to halt production, despite neither the cast nor crew testing positive for the virus. Furthermore, on 23 March, the show was removed from Seven's schedule to make way for extended coverage on the pandemic. Home and Away returned in its usual timeslot on 13 April. On 12 May 2020, it was announced that the show would recommence production following the nine-week suspension. Filming was limited to the studio and resumed on 25 May. Some storylines were rewritten to limit close contact between the actors. On 19 July 2021, Home and Away was forced to postpone scheduled filming due to new COVID-19 lockdown restrictions in Sydney. The show was already on a two-week production break, which was then extended. In early August, a spokesperson for the show confirmed filming had resumed.

=== International ===
Home and Away has been sold to over 140 countries around the world, making it one of Australia's successful media exports.

In the United Kingdom, Home and Away was first broadcast on ITV from 11 February 1989 until 8 June 2000. (LWT and Yorkshire started the series a day later) Home and Away was initially shown once a day on ITV; many regions aired it at around 5:10pm, others at 6:00pm or even 6:30pm. From 17 July 1989, a morning broadcast was introduced shown at 11am, which moved to 12:30pm on 4 September. This episode was then repeated in the early evening as previously scheduled. The show attracted up to eight million viewers, making it one of ITV's top 30 rated programmes. It also helped boost audiences for ITV's regional and early evening news bulletins. During the show's last year on ITV, Home and Away attracted an average audience of 4.4 million for its early-evening repeats. In February 2000, it was announced that Home and Away would be moving to rival Channel 5 after they bought the rights to the show in a £40m auction deal. ITV reportedly offered twice the amount by Channel 5, but the Seven Network in Australia were swayed by Channel 5's commitment to the long-term future of the show in a deal of more than five years. After ITV's contract ran out in July 2000, Home and Away went off air for 12 months as ITV had an exclusivity clause that prevented any other broadcaster from airing the show for a year.. ITV in the end had shown 2840 episodes of the series. After a delay in screening, Home and Away made its debut on Channel 5 on 16 July 2001.

Channel 5 started airing new episodes of Home and Away at 6:00 pm with a repeat showing the following day at 12:30 pm. On 16 October 2006, the newly-established digital channel Five Life (now 5Star) introduced follow-up episodes at 6:30 pm after Channel 5's broadcast. Channel 5 later started airing episodes at 1:15 pm each week day, with a repeat at 6:00 pm. The programme was also repeated on 5Star at 3:00pm and shown online via Demand 5. From July 2018, Home and Away was shown on Viacom's Paramount Network, a channel operated in the UK by Channel 5, which has now ceased. On 24 September 2021, Ofcom approved Channel 5's decision to broadcast their hour-long news show 5 News from 5pm. The change led to Neighbours being moved to Home and Away's usual 6pm slot, with the early evening repeat scrapped altogether. The 6:00 pm broadcast is now moved to 5Star in the same time slot, with the "first look" episode continuing to air at 6.30pm on the channel. In January 2024, the first season was briefly aired on That's TV2 as part of its launch schedule. It was the first time the soap opera had been aired on terrestrial TV since its original release, but the transmissions stopped after 18 episodes had been broadcast. In December 2025, it was confirmed that the lunchtime showing would be axed in January and thus, for the first time, the series would not be aired on the main channel. In the UK, Home and Away usually begins a new season in late February or early March and takes its annual Christmas break mid November, before a season has been completed, with the remaining episodes of a season beginning broadcast from early January each year. As of 12 March 2025, in line with Channel 5 rebranding to 5, new episodes of are now available ahead of the main broadcast on 5 and 5STARs first look on the 5 app which is available across multiple platforms in the United Kingdom. Home and Away is currently one week behind the Australian broadcasts however depending on Seven's output schedule of four or six episodes per week, this gap may widen back to the original six weeks.

In September 2019, the pilot episode and the first 199 episodes of the first season were made available to stream on Amazon Prime Video in the United Kingdom. In November 2019, the final 29 episodes of the first season, and the first 171 episodes of the second season were added to the service, however, they are listed as "Season 2".

In Ireland, Home and Away debuted on Monday, 3 October 1988 (with the pilot episode) as part of RTÉ's re-launch of RTÉ2 as Network 2 - their secondary channel. Episodes screened at 6.30pm and in September 1997, a daytime episode was added at 1.25pm on RTÉ One with the 6.30pm episode becoming the replay of the daytime broadcast. A repeat of the week's episodes is aired on Saturdays and Sundays on RTÉ2. Viewers in the Republic are also able to catch up with episodes on the RTÉ Player. Home and Away is one of RTÉ's most popular drama series. It was the most watched program of 2014 on the RTÉ Player with over four million viewers. As of 2014, the show is available to view in Northern Ireland on 5STAR daily at 3.30pm and 6.30pm as well as the regular Channel Five airings. The show is geo blocked in Northern Ireland on both RTÉ One and RTÉ2, but can be viewed on the Republic's Saorview platform. RTE television airs episodes exactly as shown in Australia. Home and Away is consistently RTÉ's most-watched soap opera, and in 2021, the series was streamed by 4.9 million viewers.

In New Zealand, Home and Away is broadcast on TVNZ2, with five episodes aired between 3.30pm to 6pm broadcasting every Sunday. A repeat of the episodes are spread across Monday to Friday, shown at 11:00 am each weekday. The TVNZ website also offers viewers the chance to watch episodes online with its OnDemand service. Home and Away is one of New Zealand's most popular TV series and is one of TVNZ 2's highest-rating shows. The show had previously aired on TV3 since 2002, where it consistently won high ratings for TV3 and helped boost audiences for their 6pm news bulletin. However, on 5 July 2013, the show's European distributor Endemol cancelled its agreement with TV3, causing them to lose the right to broadcast Home and Away.

In the United States, Home and Away was first shown briefly on the FX cable network from the channel's launch on 1 June 1994 to February 1995. Over two decades later, the show began streaming on the subscription service Hulu on 2 March 2015, beginning with the 2015 season. The service no longer receives new episodes, although the complete twenty-eighth season is currently available.

In Kenya, Home and Away was broadcast on the NTV network Monday to Friday at 6:00 pm.

== Storylines ==
Home and Away's storylines have ranged from mild to serious issues throughout its run. While the central stories revolve around fostering children, family and teenage problems, school problems and romances, the series has covered several controversial, adult-themed and detailed issues not suitable for young audiences, despite its early evening time of 7:00 pm. Storylines covered include abortion, accidental death, adultery, adoption, alcoholism, amnesia, amputation, arson, autism, bereavement, brain aneurysm, bullying, cancer, cage fighting, career problems, child abuse, cults, cyberbullying, domestic violence, depression, drink driving, drug overdose, drug trafficking and drug use, eating disorders, gambling addiction, health problems, hit-and-runs, HIV and AIDS, homosexuality, Huntington's disease, incest, imprisonment, kidnapping, marriage problems, miscarriage, murder, obsessive-compulsive disorder (OCD), paedophilia, phantom pregnancy, pole dancing, post-natal depression, post-traumatic stress disorder, prostitution, racism, rape, revenge porn, robbery, self-harm, sex, sexual grooming, shootings (including drive-by shootings), stabbings, stalking, stroke, SIDS (cot death), stillbirth, suicide, surrogacy, teacher-student relationships, teenage pregnancy, terminal illness, and witness protection.

The show has also featured many natural disaster storylines, including a cyclone, storm, flood, landslide, earthquake, and bushfires. There have also been several storylines involving car, bus, plane and boating accidents. Furthermore, in addition to the show featuring scenes of moderate to strong violence in past episodes, the special episode, Home and Away: All or Nothing, which became available for online streaming in January 2017, was intended for "adult-only" viewing as it was described as the most violent episode of the entire series, as it contains scenes of strong violence.

== Rating and restrictions ==
Since 1988, Home and Away has dealt with some controversial issues, despite being broadcast in a G-rated time block. Since 2008, every subsequent episode has been broadcast under the PG classification and often continues to exceed the rating. 7two aired the repeated early episodes under the PG rating, as do the streaming service 7plus. In New Zealand, the show was originally aired on TV3 in an edited 5:30 pm timeslot under the G classification. The series now airs uncut at 6:30 pm under the PG classification. In the UK, when the show aired on ITV, it was heavily edited for content that was deemed to be unsuitable for pre watershed viewing. Many episodes were edited to the point that some continuing storylines would not have made sense to UK viewers, with some episodes lasting barely 15 minutes to fit the timeslot. One episode was completely dropped, the school siege, and the 1996 season finale was very heavily edited. The closing credits were also dropped from around 1994 for timing reasons, leaving only the final scene in the closing credits, which meant that UK viewers never got to see the closing credits to the show at all. This all changed when the show moved to Channel Five in 2001, although very minor edits to some scenes remain, and the closing credits to the episodes were also reinstated. Home and Away is rated PS (recommended for a mature audience) in Ireland and has always aired with no edits. A 2023 episode was given an MA rating (18 certificate) for mature content on RTE Player.

=== Controversies ===
During the show's first season in 1988, a rape storyline for the character Carly Morris (Sharyn Hodgson) outraged the public and a protest erupted, as viewers deemed it an inappropriate subject to be covering in an early evening time slot.

In March 2007, the commercial television industry's Annual Code Complaint Report revealed that Home and Away was the eighth most complained about show on Australian television, and the only drama series in the top ten complaint list. From 1 July 2005 to 30 June 2006, there were 23 written complaints about the show as viewers thought it was inappropriate for it to be shown in its 7:00 pm timeslot.

In 2007, the show breached broadcasting rules when they aired a number of episodes featuring Martha MacKenzie (Jodi Gordon) involved with pole-dancing in the G classification, as the Australian Communications and Media Authority (ACMA) said that these episodes should have been rated PG as they contained sexual scenes and references.

In March 2009, it was alleged that Seven had agreed to censor a then-upcoming lesbian kiss scene between Charlie Buckton (Esther Anderson) and Joey Collins (Kate Bell), after receiving many complaints from conservative groups and mothers who did not want their children exposed to same-sex relationships in a family show. Seven's head of creative drama, Bevan Lee, later confirmed that the censorship allegations were in fact false and that the scene would still go to air as planned.

A 2010 episode which featured Martha McKenzie engaging in a sexual scene with Liam Murphy (Axle Whitehead) on a kitchen table was deemed "too raunchy" by a television watchdog in New Zealand, where, at the time, the series was aired in a G-rated timeslot.

In December 2023, fans of the serial branded a marketing campaign for a missing character as "disrespectful" and "gross". The show's series finale featured the kidnapping of Eden Fowler (Stephanie Panozzo). Channel Seven then launched a "Bring Eden Home" campaign featuring on-air promotions, a 1800 number to hear Eden's last phone call, and the promotion of a missing person poster across social media. The campaign proved divisive among viewers, with some branding it "epic", but others pointing out that it is insensitive to people going through a similar situation in real life.

== Reception ==
=== Popularity and viewership ===
The launch of Home and Away in 1988 was hoped to help boost the Seven Network's early evening ratings which had been underperforming in previous years. However, the show struggled to attract high ratings, particularly when compared to rival soap opera Neighbours, which was a huge ratings success at the time. By the end of 1988, Home and Away's ratings had improved. In January 1992, when Neighbours' high-rating era was over, Seven moved Home and Away to the 7:00 pm timeslot, putting both shows up against each other. This caused Network Ten to move Neighbours to the 6.30 pm timeslot two months later. During the early 2000s, Home and Away was averaging 1.3 million viewers and in 2007, viewing figures rose to 1.4 million. However, by the end of the decade, the ratings had dropped to an average of 1.1 million viewers. During the early 2010s, viewing figures had further decreased to between 800,000 and 1 million an episode. In 2012, Home and Away was averaging 981,000 viewers, down from 1.039 million in 2011 and 1.021 million in 2010.

In 2015, the show began going through a serious ratings decline. A July 2015 report revealed that the ratings were down 14% compared to the first six months of 2014, which translates to about 140,000 fewer viewers per episode. On 6 July 2015, Home and Away ranked 16th in OzTAM's overnight ratings with 750,000 viewers. The following night, the show fell to an even lower figure of 701,000 viewers. A writer for the Australian Associated Press stated that one of the reasons for the ratings decline could be "the viewing habits of Gen Y, which the show is aimed at, have changed dramatically in recent times thanks to the launch of streaming services, Netflix, Stan and Presto. The exact age demographic that Home and Away targets are the same people who do not subscribe to appointment viewing. They prefer to watch shows when they want and don't want to be dictated to by the commercial networks." A Seven spokeswoman commented that Home and Away was still performing well on digital and social platforms and that the overnight ratings were not the only measure of the show's success.

In 2019, Home and Away returned at the later date of 18 February, after the summer series of cricket concluded. Pippa Doyle of 96FM reported that declining ratings in 2018 and Seven's decision to push the show back had created doubt about its future on the network, and whether or not a timeslot change or a move to a multichannel was likely. The season returned to a series low of 620,000 viewers and ranked 13th for the night. The following night, the viewing figure fell to 581,000 and the show ranked 10th for the night. The first triple bill on 21 February pulled in 577,000 viewers and ranked 8th for the evening. The ratings for the triple bill episodes continued to fall from 524,000 to 414,000 viewers, and on 28 March 2019, the triple bill pulled in a series low of 383,000 viewers and ranked 14th for the night. April 2019 saw a slight rise in the viewing figures; the first episode of the month drew in 740,000 viewers and ranked 9th for that night.

The triple bill episodes continued to receive low ratings until the Thursday, 9 May episodes, which improved with 617,000 viewers. The following week's triple bill saw a further rise with 627,000 viewers, while the episodes broadcast on 30 May received 638,000 viewers and ranked at 7th place for the evening. The 2020 season return saw a series low for a premiere with only 548,000 tuning in. The opening episode of the 2021 season saw a rating of 597,000. The 2021 season has seen an increase in ratings with most episodes attracting over 600,000. June saw a rise in viewers when the month peaked at 650,000 for episode which aired on 22 June, while in July, the show continued to receive steady ratings, and again saw a further rise in ratings with 657,000 viewers tuning in on 7 July. The 2021 Olympic return episode, which aired on 9 August 2021, attracted the highest rating in over two years, with 710,000 viewers, with an even higher increase of 733,000 viewers tuning in on 10 August. On 31 March 2022, two episodes achieved new series lows of 382,000 and 364,000 viewers respectively.

The 2023 season return was watched by an audience of 519,000 and was ranked 6th for the evening. The 8000th episode, which aired on 27 March 2023, drew an audience of 512,000 and ranked 10th for that night. The 2023 finale triple bill was coded by Seven into one figure which was an average of 395,000.

The opening episode of the 2024 season, which aired on 8 January, drew 411,000 viewers. From 29 January 2024, the show's ratings began to rapidly increase; the episode airing that evening garnered an viewing figure of 804,000, while ratings rose to 902,000 on 6 May 2024. The highest rated episodes of the season drew in an audience of 950,000, on 15 July 2024, while the episode featuring the death of Felicity Newman (Jacqui Purvis), on 19 August 2024, garnered 953,000 viewers. The 2024 season finale, which aired on 20 November 2024, attracted a high viewership of 792,000.

The 2025 season return, airing 13 January 2025, garnered 881,000 viewers. The episode airing 10 March 2025, drew in a viewing audience of 962,000, and ranked 7th place for the evening. On 21 and 22 April 2025, saw extremely high ratings, attracting audiences of 966,000 and 988,000, respectively, while the episode airings 29 April 2025, drew in 992,000 viewers. Irene Roberts' (Lynne McGranger) final episode, which broadcast on 19 August 2025, drew in the highest rated episode of the season, at 1,098,000 viewers. The 2025 season finale, which aired on 19 November, received a high viewership of 801,000, ranking in 5th place for the night.

The opening episode of the 2026 season, airing 19 January, was watched by 963,000 viewers. The 2026 season has seen a further rise in the ratings, with three episodes surpassing 1 million viewers, giving the show the biggest audiences since August 2025. Across four nights in late April, Home and Away was the top rating entertainment show, which David Knox of TV Tonight branded "a most impressive feat" for show of 39 years. The episodes broadcast on 30 April were not aired on the primary channel, but Home and Away was still the top rated entertainment show. The 27 April episode was watched by an audience of 1.011 million, while 939,260 was the average for the week, which is an increase of 5% on the same week in 2025. This made April the serial's strongest month in over five years. The show was also up 10% on the same time period in 2025.

=== Awards and nominations ===
Home and Away has received many awards and nominations throughout the years. The show has won 48 Logie Awards from 168 nominations, making it the most awarded program in Logie history. In 2015, Home and Away was inducted into the Logie Hall of Fame. The show has also won twelve Australian Writers' Guild Awards and five Australian Directors' Guild Awards.

== Merchandise and spin-offs ==
Since 1988, Home and Away has generated a range of merchandise, including books, magazines, VHS tapes, DVDs and soundtracks. Various annuals and books about the show and its cast and characters were released in the late 1980s and early 1990s. Between 2003 and 2005, several fictional books by Leon F. Saunders and Jane Anderson were released and based on characters from Home and Away. Episodes of the show have been released on several VHS and DVDs. Home and Away: The Movie was the first VHS released in 1989 and contained the 90-minute pilot episode. Another VHS tape, Home and Away: The Official Summer Bay Special, was released in 1996. It celebrated 2,000 episodes of the show and looked back at memorable moments throughout its earlier years. Home and Away: Secrets and the City and Home and Away: Hearts Divided were the first DVDs released in October 2003, and both contained exclusive episodes that were never aired on television. Two further DVDs, Home and Away: Romances and Home and Away: Weddings were released in November 2005 and March 2006, respectively, and featured clips from the most popular romances and weddings in the series' history. Romances featured the pilot episode, while Weddings featured two episodes containing Leah and Vinnie's wedding as a bonus feature. Four soundtrack albums were released between 1996 and 2003 that featured music used on the show as well songs from some of the cast members.

Home and Away has also produced several spin-off episodes. headLand was a spin-off series focusing on a university. It ran from November 2005 until January 2006, when it was cancelled due to low ratings. In 2013, the show launched their first webisode series titled Home and Away Extras, which introduced new characters Andy (Tai Hara) and Josh Barrett (Jackson Gallagher) before they appeared on-air. The four-part websisode series was released on the show's Yahoo!7 website from 7 August 2013. On 19 August 2015, it was announced that former cast members Dan Ewing (Heath Braxton) and Lisa Gormley (Bianca Scott) would be returning for a special spin-off episode titled Home and Away: An Eye for an Eye. The episode was commissioned specially for the local streaming service Presto and did not air on the Seven Network. It centred around the Braxton family and was a feature-length episode running for over an hour. Home and Away: An Eye for an Eye was made available to watch on Presto from 9 December 2015. Following the success of Home and Away: An Eye for An Eye, it was announced on 6 May 2016 that two more feature-length episodes had been commissioned. The first episode became available on 19 December 2016 and is titled Home and Away: Revenge. The second special, Home and Away: All or Nothing, became available for viewing on 26 January 2017.

From 25 November 2019, a web television series called Home and Away: Christmas in Summer Bay will begin airing weekly on video on demand and catch up TV service My5 in the UK, as the show takes its annual Christmas break. The series is presented by former Home and Away actor Jason Smith, who interviews the show's cast members at various Summer Bay locations. The series also features clips from past episodes and behind-the-scenes footage. The series consisted of six episodes – "The Summer Bay House", "The Morgan Family", "The Mangrove River Gang", "A Surf Club Celebration", "A Home and Away Family" and "Home and Away in 2020: New Decade, New Attitude".

== See also ==
- List of longest-running Australian television series
