= Emmanuel Carella =

Australian pop singer

- Born: Emmanuele Corallo; 15 July 1982 (age 44)
- Origin: Melbourne, Australia
- Genres: Pop
- Occupation: Singer
- Years active: 2003–present
- Label: Luxor/Liberation

Emmanuel "Manni" Carella (born 15 July 1982) is an Australian pop singer who has released an album, Emmanuel (April 2005). He has issued three Top 40 singles with "Don't Say a Word" reaching No. 7 in August 2003. He was voted TV Hits' Hottest Aussie Male Pop Star, in June 2003.

== Career ==
Carella worked for a year as a dancer and backup singer on the Channel 9 talent show Starstruck (2000); he was the youngest dance team member. After recording a demo single, he became the first act signed by music and television identity Molly Meldrum to his Luxor record label, an imprint of Liberation Music.

Carella's debut single, "2 Beautiful" (March 2003), scored extensive airplay, which peaked at No. 22 on the ARIA Singles Chart. The follow-up single, "Don't Say a Word", released in August, peaked at No. 7. Carella also supported Christina Aguilera on her Australian Stripped Tour in December.

"2 Beautiful" was produced by John Farnham collaborator Phil Buckle and he has written songs with singer Russell Morris and Mark "Diesel" Lizotte as well as English writer Stefan Skarbek (credits include Sugababes and Melanie C) and LA-based songwriter, Pam Reswick. The song was possibly written about Rachel Barber, Carella's girlfriend, who had disappeared in March 1999 after leaving a dance class. Barber, 15, had told Carella (who was 16) that she was going to meet up with "an old friend" who had promised her work that would bring her "heaps of money". Barber was found dead and Caroline Reed Robertson was convicted of her murder and sentenced to 20 years in prison in November 2000, with a 14½-year minimum. Carella is depicted in the feature film, In Her Skin (2009) or I Am You (2013) by Khan Chittenden, which is based on Barber's murder.

Carella, who began writing songs at the age of 14, said: "Some of my songs are fun and happy, but most of them are deep. It all depends on how you interpret them, but yes, I did write songs for Rachel, especially around that time." In 2013 he admitted that he still thought about Barber every day. He released his debut studio album, Emmanuel, on 18 April 2005.

Since releasing his debut album, he has been travelling the world and taking a break from his recording career. Carella worked on one of the world's largest cruise ships with Royal Caribbeans "Freedom of the seas" as dance captain in 2007. As well as "Navigator" and "Mariner" of the seas as a Singer Dancer in 2006, 2008, and 2009.

In 2010 Carella appeared in the Australian production musical of, West Side Story as an onstage swing and 2nd cover to the Jet character "Action". In June 2011 he was on The Morning Show as a backup dancer for Gina G. In 2012 Carella was part of the Young Talent Time team revamped as the assistant/resident choreographer.

Carella was also part of the "Ignite the dark- colour of night dance company" in 2016 - Directed by Alfie Scalia and Daniel Ryan from Melbourne Dance Centre in Brunswick, Victoria. Currently a teacher at Melbourne Dance Centre, teaching dance (lyrical, Jazz and singing.

Carella toured Victoria in 2017 with Melbourne-based company, Masters of Choreography, as a dancer in Raise the Barre.

== Discography ==
=== Albums ===
List of albums, with selected details
Title	Details
Emmanuel	Released: April 2005; Format: CD; Label: Luxor/Liberation Music (WAR LUXCD71582)

=== Singles ===
List of singles, with selected chart positions
Title	Year	Peak chart positions	Album
Title	Year	AUS	Album
"2 Beautiful"	2003	22	Emmanuel
"Don't Say a Word"	2003	7	Emmanuel
"Run to Me"	2004	34	Emmanuel
"Follow Your Dream"	2005	83	Emmanuel

== Tours and appearances ==
- Supported Christina Aguilera on her 2003 "Stripped" tour of Australia.
- Appeared on Rove Live.
- Performed at 2004 Carols by Candlelight at Sidney Myer Music Bowl, Melbourne.
