= Vanessa Downing =

Australian actress

- Born: 5 May 1958 (age 68); Sydney, New South Wales, Australia
- Other name: Vanessa Ryan
- Education: University of Sydney
- Occupations: Actress (stage, television and film); theatre director; singer; recording artist; voice artist; lawyer
- Years active: 1977–present
- Known for: Home and Away as Pippa Fletcher (1988–1990)
- Spouse: Rodney Fischer (Director/writer)

Vanessa Downing (born 5 May 1958) also known as Vanessa Ryan, is an Australian actress, theatre director, singer, voice artist, and lawyer.

Downing was appearing with singing group The Madrigals, an acapella group who were performing at the Sydney Opera House, when she was given the role of matriarch foster mother Pippa Fletcher in Home and Away.

Downing, besides her television- and film roles, is also a prominent theatre actress who has appeared in numerous productions.

She is also a lawyer with law firm Craddock Murray Neumann, a role she juggles alongside her acting career.

== Career ==
After leaving school, Downing attended the University of Sydney, and attained her master's degree in English Literature. She subsequently trained in drama at the Australian Theatre for Young People.

Her early roles were in theatre starting from 1977, and roles include Three a Penny, Who's Afraid of Virginia Woolf? and King Lear. She is a well-known and prominent stage actress and has featured in many productions

Television roles starting from the early 1980s include: classic '80s soap opera Sons and Daughters, G.P., Water Rats, HeadLand,,All Saints and Packed to the Rafters. She had a role in the Kingswood Country re-boot series Bullpitt!, and has appeared in numerous miniseries and made-for-TV films.

=== Home and Away ===
Downing is best known for her regular role as an original cast member of the television soap opera Home and Away playing a role many years her senior as foster mother Pippa Fletcher, replacing Carole Willesee, the wife of newsreader Mike Willesee, at short notice. The casting news hit the headlines at the publicity launch of the soap. The role had been auditioned for by future Neighbours star Jackie Woodburne.

When Downing left the series in 1990, the part was recast, and taken over at short notice by Debra Lawrance who went on to play the character from 1990 to 1998, with subsequent guest appearances. After Lawrance took the role, the character remarried to Michael Ross (played by Lawrance's husband Dennis Coard) and now known as Pippa Ross, was awarded a fictitious OAM for her services as a foster parent.

=== Post-Home and Away ===
After Home and Away, Downing has continued to work extensively in theatre, though she has continued to appear on TV. She had guest roles in Water Rats, All Saints, Big Sky, G.P., A Country Practice, Funeral Going, Double Sculls, Melba and Packed to the Rafters. Her role as Muriel Johnstone in Bullpitt! during its two season run from 1997–1998 was as part of the main cast.

Downing also studied law, becoming a part-time lawyer in 2006. She specialised in immigration law for many years and worked for a law firm in Sydney.

Vanessa appeared in several shorts during 2020 and 2022, the most recent being Voice Activated. In October 2022, Vanessa was a guest on Ray Meagher's This is Your Life episode where she appeared alongside fellow ”Early Years" cast members Roger Oakley (Tom), Alex Papps (Frank) and Sharyn Hodgson (Carly).

== Filmography ==
=== Film ===
| Year | Title | Role | Notes |
|---|---|---|---|
| 1985 | The Boy Who Had Everything | College Girl singer | Feature film |
| 1986 | Funeral Going | Patricia | Film short |
| 1987 | The Everlasting Secret Family | Woman Judge | Feature film |
| 1993 | The Nostradamus Kid | 'General Booth Enters Heaven' Strolling Players | Feature film |
| 1994 | Mary | Flora MacKillop | Feature film documentary |
| 1998 | Reflections | Mrs. O'Brien | Feature film |
| 2008 | Hey Hey It’s Esther Blueburger | Music Teacher | Feature film |
| 2013 | Felony | Manny Summer | Feature film |
| 2015 | Stationery | Penny Wilkins | Film short |
| 2022 | The Immortal | Lucy (age 50) | Film short |
| 2021 | Shark | Jack’s Mum | Film short |
| 2022 | Voice Activated | Hazel | Film short |

=== Television ===
| Year | Title | Role | Notes |
|---|---|---|---|
| 1980 | The Restless Years | Georgie Lane (as Vanessa Ryan) | TV series |
| 1982 | Sons and Daughters | Cheryl Ryan (as Vanessa Ryan) | TV series, 2 episodes: "1.44", "1.60" |
| 1983 | The Disappearance of Azaria Chamberlain | Mrs. Lowe | TV film |
| 1985 | I Can't Get Started | Check-out Girl | TV film |
| 1985 | Double Sculls | Sister Cathy | TV film |
| 1987 | Melba | Evie Doyle | TV miniseries, 2 episodes |
| 1988–1990 | Home and Away | Pippa Fletcher | TV series, 361 episodes |
| 1990 | Motormouth | Guest | TV series, 1 episode |
| 1990 | TV Celebrity Dance Party | Herself (as The Madrigirls) | TV special |
| 1991 | A Country Practice | Fiona Farrell | TV series, 1 episode: "For the Good Times: Part 1" |
| 1993 | Good Morning Australia | Guest | TV series, 1 episode |
| 1993 | The Midday Show | Guest | TV series, 1 episode |
| 1993 | G.P. | Pam Preston | TV series, 1 episode: "Close to Her Chest" |
| 1997 | Water Rats | Margaret Hobbs | TV series, 1 episode: "The Messenger" |
| 1997 | Big Sky | Danielle Morgan | TV series, 1 episode: "The Right Thing" |
| 1997–1998 | Bullpitt! | Muriel Johnstone | TV series, 26 episodes |
| 1998, 2002 | All Saints | Helen Lancaster / Claire Hobson | TV series, 3 episodes: "Live Now, Pay Later", "Slings and Arrows" |
| 2006 | HeadLand | Pamela Martin | TV series, 3 episodes: "1.50", "1.51", "1.52" |
| 2006 | Where Are They Now? | Herself (with Home and Away cast) | TV series, 1 episode |
| 2008 | Packed to the Rafters | Shirley | TV series, 1 episode: "Removing the Block" |
| 2012 | Rake | Judge | TV series, 1 episode |
| 2014 | The Moodys | Robin Benson | TV series, 1 episode: "Australia Day" |
| 2019 | Mr Inbetween | Lorraine | TV series, 1 episode: "I Came from Your Balls?" |
| 2020 | Black Comedy | | TV series, 1 episode |
| 2022 | This Is Your Life: Ray Meagher | Herself (with Roger Oakley, Alex Papps & Sharyn Hodgson) | TV series, 1 episode |

== Theatre ==
Source: AusStage

| Year | Production | Details |
|---|---|---|
| 1977 | Twenty Six Efforts at Pornography | 1 show (NSW) |
| 1977 | The Sunny South | 1 show (NSW) |
| 1977 | Narrow Road to the Deep North | 1 show |
| 1980 | The Ship’s Whistle | 1 show (South Australia) |
| 1980 | Pericles, Prince of Tyre | 1 show (South Australia) |
| 1980 | Traitors | 1 show (South Australia) |
| 1980 | A Month in the Country | 1 show (South Australia) |
| 1980 | The Ship’s Whistle | 1 show (South Australia) |
| 1981 | Upstairs Down at the Bottom of the World | 1 show (South Australia) |
| 1981 | Buckleys! | 1 show (South Australia) |
| 1981 | Kangaroos in the Top Paddock | 1 show (South Australia) |
| 1981 | As You Like It | 2 shows (South Australia) |
| 1981 | The Threepenny Opera | 1 show |
| 1982 | Charley’s Opera | 23 shows (NSW) |
| 1983 | Sister Mary Ignatius Explains It All For You | 1 show (NSW) |
| 1983 | The Actor's Nightmare | 1 show (NSW) |
| 1984 | Gentlemen Prefer Blondes | 4 shows |
| 1984 | Key Largo | 4 shows |
| 1984 | Don's Party | 4 shows (Queensland) |
| 1984 | Beach Blanket Tempest | 7 shows (national tour - QLD, SA, ACT) |
| 1984 | Private Lives | 2 shows |
| 1985 | Steaming | 2 shows (NSW, ACT) |
| 1986 | Away | 1 show (NSW) |
| 1986 | The Madras House | |
| 1986 | Measure for Measure | 1 show (NSW) |
| 1987 | Who's Afraid of Virginia Woolf? | 4 shows (South Australia) |
| 1988 | The 16th Australian National Playwrights Conference | 1 show (NSW) |
| 1989 | Ring Round the Moon | 1 show (South Australia) |
| 1990 | The Increased Difficulty of Concentration | 1 show (NSW) |
| 1990 | Season’s Greetings | 1 show (Queensland) |
| 1992 | St. James Infirmary Blues | 1 show (NSW) |
| 1992 | The Heiress | 1 show |
| 1993 | Daylight Saving | 1 show (NSW) |
| 1993 | Wet and Dry | 1 show (NSW) |
| 1994 | Composing Venus | 1 show (Queensland) |
| 1994 | Goodworks | 1 show (NSW) |
| 1995 | Falling from Grace | ACT |
| 1995 | Three Birds Alighting on a Field | 1 show (South Australia) |
| 1995 | How the Other Half Lives | 1 show (NSW) |
| 1996 | Live Stages on Stage | 1 show (NSW) |
| 1996 | Good Works | 2 shows (SA, NSW) |
| 1998 | Chasing the Drama | 1 show (NSW) |
| 1991 | Macbeth | NSW |
| 2000 | A Cheery Soul | 1 show (NSW) |
| 2001 | Love Bites | 1 show (NSW) |
| 2001 | Morning Sacrifice | 1 show (NSW) |
| 2002 | The Lady in the Van | 1 show (NSW) |
| 2002 | Hello, Dolly! | 1 show (Victoria) |
| 2003 | Mother and Child | 1 show (NSW) |
| 2003 | Howard Katz | 1 show (NSW) |
| 2004 | Afterplay / The Yalta Game | 1 show (NSW) |
| | Influence | 4 shows (national tour) |
| 2006 | Bone | 1 show (NSW) |
| 2007 | King Lear | 7 shows (NSW) |
| 2008 | The Busy World is Hushed | 1 show (NSW) |
| 2009 | The Taming of the Shrew | 9 shows |
| 2011–2012 | Faustus | 2 shows (NSW) |
| 2012 | Pygmalion. | 1 show (NSW) |
| 2013 | The Glass Menagerie | 2 shows (NSW) |
| 2013–2014 | Much Ado About Nothing | 3 shows (NSW) |
| 2013–2014 | Cyrano de Bergerac | 2 shows (NSW) |
| 2018–2020 | Black is the New White | 8 shows (national tour) |
| 2020 | Wicked Sisters | 1 show (NSW) |
| 2021–2022 | Grand Horizons | 2 shows (NSW) |
| 2023 | Do Not Go Gently | 1 show |
| 2023 | On the Beach | 1 show |
