= Sally Fletcher =

- Home and Away character
- Portrayed by: Kate Ritchie; Chloe Shelsher (flashbacks)
- Duration: 1988–2008, 2013
- First appearance: 17 January 1988
- Last appearance: 5 September 2013
- Introduced by: Alan Bateman (1988); Lucy Addario (2013)
In-universe information
- Other names: Sally Copeland (birth name); Sally Keating
- Occupation: Student (1988–2000); Teacher (2001–); Caravan Park Owner; Principal of Summer Bay High (2003–2004, 2007–2008); Deputy principal of Summer Bay High (2004–2007); Foster mother (2005–2008)
- Father: Aaron Copeland
- Mother: Diana Wilson
- Adoptive father: Tom Fletcher
- Adoptive mother: Pippa Ross
- Stepfather: Derek Wilson; Michael Ross (adopted stepfather); Ian Routledge (1999–) (adopted stepfather)
- Brothers: Miles Copeland; Christopher Fletcher (adoptive); Dale Ross (adoptive); Haydn Ross (step)
- Husband: Flynn Saunders (2003–2006)
- Daughters: Pippa Saunders
- Grandmothers: Mrs. Keating
- Uncles: Ross Keating
- Nieces: Amber Copeland

Sally Fletcher (also Keating) is a fictional character from the Australian soap opera Home and Away, played by Kate Ritchie. She made her first screen appearance during the serial's pilot episode, which was broadcast on 17 January 1988. Sally became the longest running original female cast member. She departed on 3 April 2008. Ritchie earned various awards and nominations for her portrayal of Sally. In February 2013, it was announced that Ritchie would be reprising her role. Sally returned during the episode broadcast on 15 July 2013 with her daughter. They departed on 5 September 2013.

== Casting ==
Ritchie auditioned for the role of Sally in front of executive producer John Holmes in 1987. Her audition scene was all about strawberry jam and Sally's imaginary friend Milco. Ritchie told Jason Herbison of British magazine All About Soap that she could remember reading Sally's scenes for Holmes, before auditioning for the director who recorded it on video. She added "I remember when my mum told me I got the part of Sally. I didn't want her to tell anyone because I was really embarrassed." Holmes revealed Ritchie had stood out among the other actresses auditioning for the role. He said "Actors always choose themselves for a role and in this case Kate Ritchie shone head and shoulders above all the rest." During flashbacks to the character's childhood, Sally was played by Chloe Shelsher.

In 2008, Ritchie said of her role, "I well and truly know the girl that is Sally Fletcher. If only I had realised earlier she wasn't my enemy, she wasn't the embarrassing little sister always trying to spoil my fun but, in fact, the best friend I ever had....In my Logie acceptance speech last year I said Home and Away had always been my constant and the same goes for Sally. We have spent the past 20 years side by side....Sally is a good person. She is the true meaning of the word good, often a quality that goes unnoticed and is most definitely underrated. Sounds crazy, but it is true."

=== Departure and return ===
After twenty years, Ritchie departed Home and Away and her last episode aired on 3 April 2008. Ritchie admitted that she had thought about leaving the show for years, but finally made her decision to go in 2007. She filmed her final scenes in December that year. Ritchie compared her exit from the show to ending a romantic relationship, writing "My decision to leave Home and Away could draw many similarities to breaking up with the boyfriend you just knew you had to... You still loved him, you always would and no doubt you were going to miss him like crazy – after all, you're not sure you even remember life before he came along. But something just wasn't right any more and the time had come for the inevitable parting of ways. Melodramatic? Perhaps. Only because I am desperate to normalise a situation that seems harder to explain as each day passes and for every one of those days I get closer to having to say goodbye to Sally Fletcher." Ritchie called Sally's exit storyline "perfect", while critic Farah Farouque stated "the last episode featuring Sally is a TV moment of note."

On 10 February 2013, it was announced that Ritchie would be reprising her role for "a special story arc". Of her return, Ritchie stated "There will be a wonderful sense of familiarity stepping back into Sally’s shoes for a while. Summer Bay is a very different place these days and I am looking forward to working with all the fresh faces that have continued to take Home and Away from strength to strength. It will be a good opportunity to catch up with some old mates too! Those cast and crew I worked with for so many years are who I have missed the most." Ritchie said that her decision to reprise her role depended on Sally having a great return story, as she did not want to come back and change sheets. The actress began filming Sally's return on 25 February. A promotional trailer for Sally's return was released on 20 June. It shows Sally returning to Summer Bay and stating that she had to come back, but is afraid to tell anyone why. Sally returned with her daughter on 15 July 2013.

== Storylines ==
=== Backstory ===
Twins Sally and Miles lived together with their alcoholic father Aaron (Timothy Walter) and mother Diana. Aaron used to beat Diana, so she left him. Diana and new husband Derek Wilson had been killed in a boating accident. She went to live with her grandmother Mrs. Keating, but she developed Alzheimer's Disease. Sally was soon fostered by Tom (Roger Oakley) and Pippa Fletcher (Vanessa Downing; Debra Lawrence). Sally had an imaginary friend named Milco. Aaron and Miles went to find Sally, but after seeing Sally was better off with the Fletcher family, they left.

=== 1988–2000 ===
Sally and her family move to Summer Bay and she takes an instant dislike to Bobby Simpson (Nicolle Dickson). However, they become close friends when Tom and Pippa foster Bobby. Sally runs away in 1989 when she is teased by new foster child Dodge, and this makes Tom and Pippa realize just how much she means to them and they decide to adopt her. When Tom dies and Pippa begins a relationship with Michael Ross (Dennis Coard), Sally is resistant and frequently rude to Michael. Sally later warms to Michael after he and Pippa marry. She is overjoyed when Pippa has another baby, Dale (Olivia Alfonzetti), but is devastated when he dies of SIDS. Further tragedy occurs when Bobby is killed in a boating accident. As Sally grows, she is attracted to many boys; the first of whom is Damian Roberts (Matt Doran), her foster brother. Sally kisses Damian while he is asleep only to be witnessed by Pippa. Pippa and Michael begin having financial problems caused by Michael's son Haydn's (Andrew Hill) gambling debts. New student Joe Lynch (Justin Rosniak) bullies Sally for a while, but eventually owns up when he is confronted by Donald Fisher. Sally dates Gus Bishop (Samuel Johnson), but is scared off by his criminal antics. Sally then begins seeing Nelson McFarlane (Laurence Breuls), but Nelson is badly burned in a bushfire caused by Jack Wilson (Daniel Amalm). He pushes Sally away, upsetting her. She then falls for Jack, but they break up after Jack's jealousy over Brendan Coyne (Billy Mitchell).

Peter Moss (Ron Haddrick), a man staying at the caravan park, believes Sally is the reincarnation of his daughter. Sally remembers a song Moss used to sing even though she never heard it. Sally and Shannon Reed (Isla Fisher) are involved in a car accident and Moss is killed. Soon after, Michael drowns while saving Sam Marshall's (Ryan Clark) life and Sally loses a 'father' for the fourth time. To cheer her up, Shannon and Selina Roberts (Tempany Deckert) take her out on a raft built by Liam Tanner (Peter Scarf) and Joey Rainbow (Alex O'Han). The raft breaks and Sally is sent adrift and washes up in the bush. She is found by Jamie Grace (Jamie Oxenbould), a man with learning difficulties, and then rescued by Steven Matheson (Adam Willits). Sally begins seeing Tim O'Connell (Nick Hardcastle), losing her virginity to him, until he is arrested. Sally then self-destructs and has sex with Scott Irwin (Heath Ledger). She also steals exam papers from Donald Fisher's office for him. When Tim returns to town after the charges are dropped, Sally feels guilty and confesses all to him. Scott takes revenge on Sally after she reveals the truth by attempting to plant some of Donald's things in her locker. However, Aaron Welles (Ritchie Gudgeon) witnesses this and moves the items into Scott's locker resulting in Scott's expulsion.

Pippa decides to leave town to live with her new boyfriend Ian Routledge (Patrick Dickson) and Sally assumes she will let her and Tim move into the house. She is angry when instead she asked Travis (Nic Testoni) and Rebecca Nash (Belinda Emmett) to move in. However, she and Pippa reconcile before Pippa's departure. Sally ends things with Tim after he gets jealous of her and accuses Travis of liking young girls after seeing Sally hug him. Sally then moves into Travis' old house with Vinnie Patterson (Ryan Kwanten) and Jesse McGregor (Ben Unwin). She briefly has a fling with Sean Ellis (Mark Gerber) but he cheats on her with his ex-wife Tanya (Antonia Murphy). Murray (Scott Major), a drifter holds up the Bayside Diner, Sally is shot in the leg during siege but recovers. Sally and Vinnie are surprised when they fall for each other and begin a relationship. However, although they soften each other's hard edges a bit, it becomes evident they are ultimately too different and split after just a year.

=== 2000–2008 ===
Sally goes to Ireland and returns with fiancé, Kieran Fletcher (Spencer McLaren). She moves in with Shauna Bradley (Kylie Watson) and Leah Poulos (Ada Nicodemou). At her wedding Gypsy Nash (Kimberley Cooper) announces Kieran has been making advances towards her. Sally blames Gypsy but sees sense. Upset Sally starts suffering from obsessive compulsive disorder. Kieran's best man, Luke Harvey (Nick Flint), arrives to help Sally through her troubles. The pair soon develop feelings for each other and become engaged. Sally abandons her plans to become an archaeologist and decides to become a teacher. Principal Judith Ackroyd (Anna Hruby) appoints Sally as Summer Bay High's new history teacher. Sally and Luke become distant due to work. Harry Reynolds (Justin Melvey) kisses her and she realises she has to call the wedding off. She starts dating colleague Brett Egan (Emmanuel Marshall), however she reports him for assaulting Noah Lawson (Beau Brady) and he leaves her. She and Gypsy become good friends.

When Flynn Saunders (Martin Dingle-Wall) starts working at the Drop-In Centre, he and Sally start a romance. Sally is angry when she finds out Shauna has tried to seduce Flynn and ends her friendship with her. While she is in the hospital, Sally discovers that she has ovarian cancer and has to have a hysterectomy. Before the operation she has some of her eggs frozen. Sally realises she cannot have children and thinks Flynn will leave her. Sally, Sophie and Blake Dean (Les Hill) become lost in the bush after a boating accident, but they are soon found. Sally moves in with Charlotte Adams (Stephanie Chaves-Jacobsen), but when she dies, Sally agrees to let Flynn move in. Sally decides she wants to find a surrogate mother and Sophie agrees to do it. At the first ultrasound they find out she is carrying two babies with different parents: one is Sally and Flynn's, the other Blake and Sophie's. Soon after, Sophie miscarries Sally's baby.

Sally becomes acting principal and Angie Russell (Laurie Foell) plots to get rid of her by triggering her OCD once more. Sally hands her job to Paris Burnett (Rhett Giles), but after she proves that Angie tried to seduce student, Nick Smith (Chris Egan), she becomes the new deputy principal and clashes with Barry Hyde (Ivar Kants). Sally and Flynn get married and Leah offers to be a surrogate mother for them. Sally turns a blind eye to the various problems during Leah's pregnancy, such as Flynn and Leah kissing. Leah gives birth to a girl and Sally and Flynn name her Pippa. Sally moves back into the house at the caravan park and begins fostering Ric Dalby (Mark Furze) and Cassie Turner (Sharni Vinson). She is pushed from a ladder by the Summer Bay Stalker and suffers a brain haemorrhage. Someone tampers with her life support machine in an effort to kill her. Upon her release from hospital, Sally is abducted by the culprit, Eve Jacobsen (Emily Perry), who ties her up in an abandoned building full of gas, Sally manages to escape the resulting explosion. Diesel Williams (Marcus Jacometti) one of Sally's students, claims they have been having an affair. Sally is investigated by both the police and the Department of Education. Diesel later holds Sally hostage and Flynn saves her. Flynn is diagnosed with skin cancer and his condition is too advanced to operate. His health slowly deteriorates and he dies. Alf Stewart moves in with Sally for support. Sally becomes attracted to Brad Armstrong (Chris Sadrinna), but is disappointed to learn he is marrying Emily Vincent (Libby Richmond). When Emily dies from Leukemia, it is revealed that she gave her blessing to Sally and Brad starting a relationship.

Sally tries to turn Rocco Cooper's (Ian Meadows) life around. However, she is unsuccessful and Rocco is drawn back into his brother Johnny's (Callan Mulvey) gangster world. Johnny threatens to kill Rocco if he does not get rid of Sally, so Rocco stabs her and leaves her to die. Sally survives, but Johnny kills Rocco and Ric is imprisoned for the murder. The incident brings Sally and Brad closer and he moves in. Sally becomes principal again when Brad is forced to step down. Brad proposes to Sally, but she turns him down. However, when he becomes lost at sea she changes her mind. On their wedding day, Sally jilts Brad and he later moves out. Alf hits Pippa with his car and Sally throws him out, but later forgives him. When Sally shares a kiss with Brad, she hopes they can reconcile and arranges some counselling. But when she realises Brad wants something different, she accepts that they are over.

Sally looks after a homeless man named Miles (Josh Quong Tart) and learns that he is her long lost brother. She does not initially believe him, but he explains that he is the "Milco" she used to imagine. They get to know each other and catch up on lost time. Johnny escapes from prison and stabs Sally, who nearly dies. She has a near death vision of her adoptive father Tom, who shows her what life would be like in Summer Bay without her. Sally resigns from the school after Martin Bartlett (Bob Baines) takes her job and realises that she no longer has any responsibilities in the Bay. Sally and Cassie make plans to go travelling, so Ric and Miles organise a leaving concert at the school. Pippa, Carly and Steven return for her send off. Sally signs half of the house and caravan park over to Miles, before saying goodbye. She then joins Cassie in Phuket. Later on, Miles joins his sister there, after she finds him a teaching job.

=== 2013 ===
Five years later, Sally returns to Summer Bay with her daughter Pippa (now played by Piper Morrissey). Sally shows Pippa around her favourite places and shows concern for her health. Sally turns up at beach one day and shocks Alf when she reveals she is back for a while. Sally then reveals to Alf that Pippa has Mitochondrial disease, which is incurable but later she finds a cure in America so she asks Alf for the money for the treatment and he gives it to her.

== Reception ==
For her portrayal of Sally, Ritchie garnered various awards and nominations. At the 2006 Logie Awards, Ritchie won the Most Popular Actress award and earned a nomination for Most Popular Personality on Australian Television. The following year, Ritchie was nominated in both categories again and she went on to win the awards. In 2008, the actress won both the Most Popular Actress and Most Popular Personality awards once again. 2009 saw Ritchie gather nominations in the same categories. At the first Digital Spy Soap Awards, Ritchie received a nomination for Most Popular Actress. The episode featuring Sally standing Brad Armstrong up on their wedding day earned the episode's writer Margaret Wilson an Australian Writer's Guild award in 2008.

Of the character, executive producer John Holmes said "Sally is the most loved character on the show and the viewers feel passionately about her survival...No character over the last 19 years compares in popularity to Sally though, except maybe Ray Meagher (who plays Alf). Viewers have seen Sally grow up from an eight-year-old little girl and don't want to see her go."
