= Alex Papps =

Australian actor

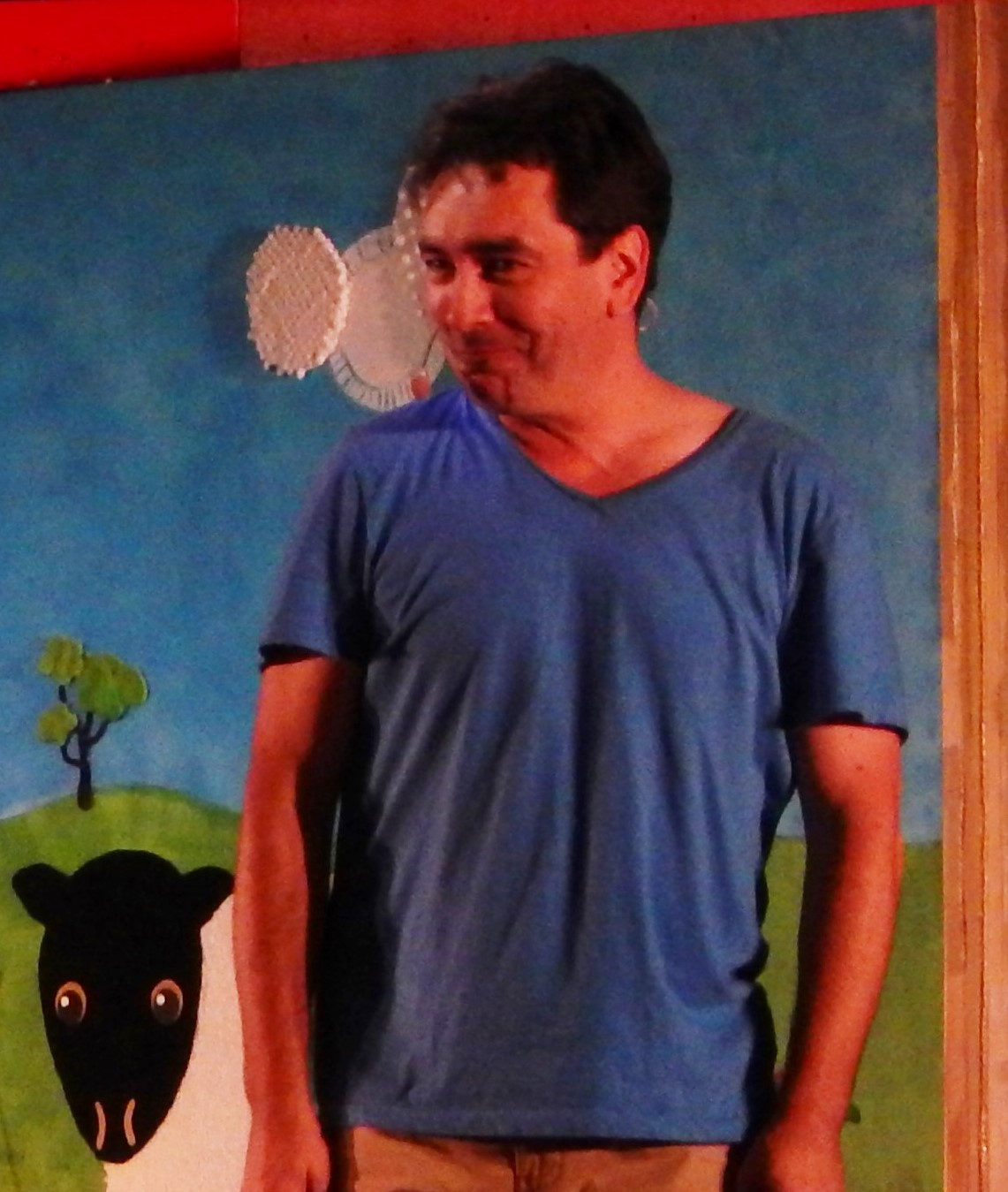
- Papps in 2015
- Born: 11 February 1969 (age 57); Melbourne, Australia
- Occupations: Actor; television host; writer; singer
- Years active: 1985−present
- Known for: Home and Away as Frank Morgan; Presenter on Play School; The Flying Doctors; The Henderson Kids
- Awards: Logie Award for Most Popular New Talent (1988)

Alex Papps (born 11 February 1969) is an Australian actor, television host, writer and singer.

== Early life ==
Papps was born in Melbourne in 1969, to Apollo Papps who, though identifying as Greek, was born in Cairo, Egypt and a mother of English and Jewish descent. Both his parents were teachers and later amateur theatre directors. He attended Belgrave Kindergarten, Upwey South Primary School, Tecoma Primary, and Upwey High School. He performed in a number of theatre productions prior to leaving school.

Papps went on to study drama and media at Box Hill College of TAFE in Melbourne. In 1995, he graduated as an actor from the Western Australian Academy of Performing Arts (WAAPA). Later in his career, he graduated as a director from the Victorian College of the Arts (VCA) in 2007.

== Career ==
In 1987, Papps guested in TV serial Neighbours as arsonist Greg Davis. He went on to secure his first major television role in children's series The Henderson Kids II, which aired on Network Ten. He attended an open audition for the show and after a couple of screen tests, he was cast as Vinnie Cerantino, the leader of the Brown Street Boys gang.

Papps became better known for his role in Home and Away as Frank Morgan. Frank was the first character to appear on the series, in its 1988 pilot, and the first foster kid taken in by Pippa and Tom. The following year, he won the Logie Award for Most Popular New Talent.

From 1987 to 1989, Papps was also co-host of music program The Factory, alongside Andrew Daddo, airing on the ABC on Saturday mornings. He next joined the cast of medical drama The Flying Doctors, as the local mechanic, Nick Cardaci, from 1989 to 1990. After The Flying Doctors, Papps appeared in several theatre productions and studied acting in Perth for three years. He appeared in the feature film Head On and guested in an episode of Stingers. In 2000, he guest starred in an episode of Blue Heelers as Stephen Farrow, a man who believes his wife's grandmother was murdered by a local doctor.

After his agent made several attempts to secure him an audition for ABC children's show Play School, he began his tenure as a long-time presenter in 2005, alongside former Home and Away co-star Justine Clarke (who had played his girlfriend Roo Stewart, and with whom he also later appeared in the ABC drama series The Time of Our Lives).

In 2014, Papps released an album of children's songs, called Let's Put the Beat in Our Feet. which was nominated for an ARIA Award.

In 2017, Papps had a guest role on ABC series Seven Types of Ambiguity, playing the role of Robert Henshaw. The same year, actively on the audition trail, and committed to kick-starting a new phase of his acting career, Papps made a guest appearance on drama series Offspring. He played the role of Simon, who had a fling with single mother Billie Proudman (Kat Stewart), towards the end of her marriage.

The following year, Papps returned to Home and Away, alongside co-star Nicolle Dickson (who played his foster sister and later, wife) to celebrate the Home and Away 30th-anniversary commemoration.

Papps' other acting credits include Fisk, Ms Fisher's Modern Murder Mysteries, Seven Types of Ambiguity and Blue Heelers, Preacher, Australia On Trial, City Homicide, MDA, Stingers, Prisoner, State Coroner and The Saddle Club.

Papps' film credits include playing the role of Peter in Ana Kokkinos' 1998 LGBT romantic drama film Head On (alongside Alex Dimitriades) and Anthony in Five Moments of Infidelity in 2006.

On stage, Papps has performed for the Melbourne Theatre Company in theatre productions of This Old Man Comes Rolling Home, Mad Forest, and as Romeo in Romeo and Juliet. He also performed in several pantomimes in the UK in the early 1990s, including Snow White and Cinderella.

Papps is also a director and writer. His directing credits include Aladdin at Assembly Rooms, Royal Tunbridge Wells, UK), Broken for the Melbourne Fringe Festival (2002), Riders to the Sea (2007), The Mercy Seat for Red Stitch Actors Theatre (2008), Randy's Postcards from Purgatory (2009), Sober (2011), Randy's Anticrisis and The Last Temptation of Randy once again for the Melbourne Fringe Festival (2013).

He has written for Home and Away and Play School. He also worked as a dialogue coach on 2009 feature film Blessed and 2019 SBS miniseries The Hunting.

Papps has also taught at several acting institutions in Melbourne.

== Controversy ==
In 2013, an arts and craft segment on an episode of Play School went viral on social media, when Papps and co-host Rachael Coopes constructed a device that unintentionally resembled a homemade bong.

== Filmography ==
=== Film ===
Year	Title	Role	Notes
1998	Head On	Peter	Feature film
2006	Five Moments of Infidelity	Anthony / Husband	Feature film (segment 4)

=== Television ===
Year	Title	Role	Notes
1985	Prisoner	Boy 2	Season 7, episode 8
1985	Neighbours	Ian	Episode 149
1987	Neighbours	Greg Davis	Recurring
1987	The Henderson Kids	Vinnie Cerantino	Series regular
1988–1989, 1991–1992, 2000, 2002	Home and Away	Frank Morgan	Series regular
1989–1990	The Flying Doctors	Nick Cardaci	Series regular
1997	State Coroner	Dr. Hamish Campbell	Season 1, episode 13
2000	Blue Heelers	Stephen Farrow	Season 7, episode 15
2000	Stingers	Derek Mason	Season 3, episode 11
2001	The Saddle Club	Ben Lawrence	Season 1, episode 8
2002	MDA	Dr. Hamish McGregor	Season 1, episode 6
2003	Blue Heelers	Jamie Kingston	Season 10, episode 3
2006–present	Play School	Presenter	
2008	City Homicide	Supt. Campbell Harland	Season 2, episode 10
2012	Australia on Trial	William Hobbs	Miniseries, episode 3
2013	The Time of Our Lives	Tom Reid	Season 1, episodes 7 & 10
2017	Seven Types of Ambiguity	Robert Henshaw	Season 1, episodes 5 & 6
2017	Offspring	Simon	Season 7, episode 4
2018	Endless Summer: 30 Years of Home and Away	Himself	TV documentary special
2019	Preacher	Child Services Driver	Season 4, episode 3
2019	Part-Time Private Eyes	Ian	Season 1, episodes 1 & 2
2021	Ms Fisher's Modern Murder Mysteries	Barry McBride	Season 2, episode 4
2021–2022	Fisk	Petro Andarakis	Seasons 1–2, 2 episodes
2022	La Brea	Professor	Season 2, episode 5

== Theatre ==
=== As actor ===
Year	Title	Role	Notes	Ref.
1990	This Old Man Comes Rolling Home		Russell St Theatre, Melbourne with MTC	
1991	The Marriage of Fabio	Singer	Malthouse Theatre, Melbourne with Victoria State Opera	
1991	Mad Forest	Radu Antonescu	Russell St Theatre, Melbourne with MTC	
1991–1992	Snow White and the Seven Dwarfs	Muddles	Sunderland Empire Theatre, UK	
1993–1994	Cinderella	Buttons	Pavilion Theatre, Weymouth, UK, Sunderland Empire, Sands Centre, Carlisle	
1996	Emma		Griffith Ex-Servicemens Club with Riverina Theatre Company	
2003	Stones in His Pockets		Griffith Regional Theatre with Riverina Theatre Company	
2004	Gaudi and the Turtle	Gaudi	Arts House Meat Market, Melbourne with Tortuga Theatre	
2006	Sleepless Night		Fairfax Studio, Melbourne with Arts Centre Melbourne for Short+Sweet	
2010	Becky Shaw	Andrew Porter	MTC with Echelon Productions	
	Romeo and Juliet	Romeo	Southbank Theatre, Melbourne with MTC	

=== As director ===
Year	Title	Role	Notes	Ref.
2002	Broken	Director	Chapel Off Chapel, Melbourne with Grail Theatre Company for Melbourne Fringe Festival	
2007	Riders to the Sea / Woyzeck	Director	Space 28, Melbourne with VCA	
2008	The Mercy Seat	Director / Sound Designer	Red Stitch Actors Theatre, Melbourne	
2011	Sober	Director		
	Randy's Anticrisis	Director		
2013	The Last Temptation of Randy	Director	Lithuanian Club, Melbourne for Melbourne Fringe Festival	
	Aladdin	Director	Assembly Rooms, Royal Tunbridge Wells, UK	

== Awards and nominations ==
Year	Work	Award	Category	Result
1988	Home and Away	Logie Awards	Most Popular New Talent	Won
2014	Let's Put the Beat in Our Feet	ARIA Awards	Best Children's Album	Nominated
