= Home and Away: The Musical =

- The tour programme front cover for Home and Away: The Musical
- Music: Chris Summerfield
- Lyrics: Olu Rowe
- Book: Various
- Basis: Home and Away created by Alan Bateman
- Productions: 1991: UK Tour

Home and Away: The Musical is a 1991 stage musical with music and lyrics by Chris Summerfield, except Lyrics and melody on "Junk Food", "I Wanna Be A Dancer" by Olu Rowe. Lyrics to "Surfing" by Olu Rowe and Chris Summerfield. and a book by various writers. It is based on the Australian soap opera Home and Away. The show was created and directed by Paul Hammond and developed by the British Albermarle Montrose company. The musical features thirteen scenes divided between two acts, with fourteen musical numbers. Hammond developed the idea after realising Home and Away potential to become a successful musical that would be an ideal fit in the 1990s lifestyle. Hammond envisioned the musical that would replicate the success and legacy of Grease. Hammond travelled to Australia to secure the rights for the show. He met with potential cast members and hired the original cast members Justine Clarke, Mouche Phillips, Adam Willits, Sharyn Hodgson, Julian McMahon and Craig Thomson. British actors Matthew Cammelle, Andrew Lawden, Karen Heyworth and Paul Murphy assumed the remaining roles. Home and Away's executive producer Des Monaghan and staff from the Seven Network in Australia offered support during the show's development.

The show's plot focuses mainly on the character of Roo Stewart, whose diner business is under threat from villain Mr Big. The Summer Bay locals band together to save their diner. Throughout the story, the characters break out into song and the show's musical numbers occur. The show was choreographed by Trudy Moffatt and featured a chorus and a band. The show's sets were based on locations that appear in Home and Away. These include the Diner, Summer Bay beach and the Fletcher family kitchen. The music numbers ranged from jazz, funk and ballads with energetic dance routines. The show debuted at The Assembly Hall in Tunbridge Wells on 10 June 1991. It toured the United Kingdom across fifteen venues until October that year. The musical cost £1.6 million to produce and was promoted in British media and on television. The show attracted controversy towards the end of its run due to actors failing to attend the shows.

Home and Away: The Musical received mixed reviews from theatre and media critics alike. The majority of the show's original cast performances were negatively critiqued but Clarke received praise for her role as Roo. The show's choreography was mainly applauded but the show's writing and main storyline were berated. The show was popular with younger audiences and fans of its source material, Home and Away. Critics noted a positive atmosphere and reception at all shows, largely from the show's fan base.

== Plot ==
Roo Stewart is the owner of The Diner, a restaurant business located in Summer Bay. Mr Big plans to buy The Diner and turn it into a fast food restaurant. The town's local residents come together and form a campaign to save the diner from Mr Big's takeover.

== Musical numbers ==
=== Act I ===
- "Summer Bay" – The Company
- "Junk Food" – Frank
- "Get Yourself a Man" – Roo, Viv and Carly
- "Bikin'" – Ben, Martin + Boys
- "To Be Me" – Frank and Roo
- "Together" – Frank and Company

=== Act II ===
- "Surfing" – The Company
- "Mr Big" – Mr Big + Company
- "With Just a Kiss" – Gina
- "Dancer" – Viv + Dancers
- "I'm Still in Love with You" – Frank and Roo
- "Rockin' on the Beach" – The Company
- "Home and Away (Reprise)" – The Company
- "Together" – The Company

Home and Away: The Musical features fourteen musical numbers across two acts. The musical's score features various genres of music including rock, jazz and ballads. The song "Summer Bay" featured in the musical explores Home and Away's fictional setting. The chorus of which included the lyrics: "Summer Bay belongs to you, Summer Bay is your home too." "Junk Food" is a song staged with giant fast props and themed costumes decorated with chips. "Junk Food" was also promoted as an official single from the musical. "Home and Away (Reprise)", the show's theme song is also featured in the set. The songs "Bikin'", "Surfing" and "Dancer" employ lively dance routines from the cast. The setlist also features duets with the characters of Frank and Roo.

== Creation and background ==
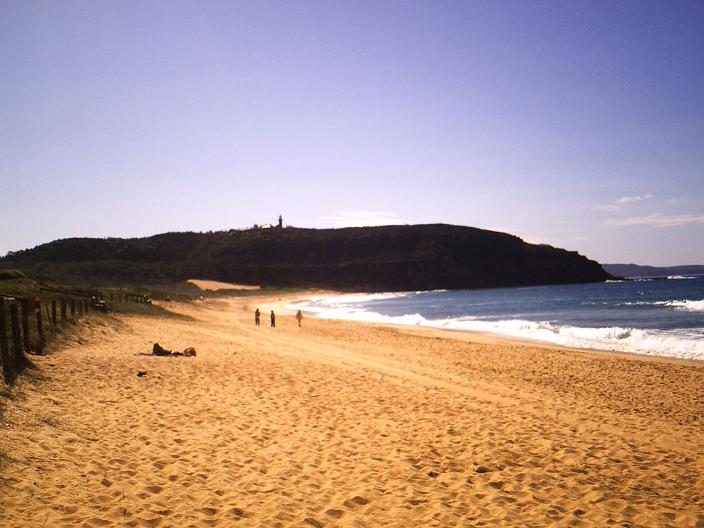
Palm Beach provides the setting of the fictional town of Summer Bay, which inspired Hammand to create the musical.

In 1990, a stage musical of the Australian soap opera Prisoner Cell Block H was produced and toured around theatre venues in the United Kingdom. Producers of another Australian soap opera, Neighbours monitored Prisoner Cell Block H's theatrical journey and were less inclined to adapt their show for musical theatre. Producers of Home and Away allowed their brand to used and musical stage show was developed based on the series. Soap opera being used in musical theatre can be viewed as lowbrow by theatre critics. Producers of the musical were not worried about the critical success and opted to create a "visual, easy listening" show.

That year, Paul Hammond and his company Montrose Entertainment acquired the creative rights from Home and Away to produce the show. Hammond has stated that his original vision was inspired by Home and Away's fictional setting of Summer Bay. He believed it could be a "terrific attraction" for theatre revellers and imagined the show being the "Grease of the nineties". Hammond learned about a demographic who only attended theatre show's featuring television actors, including pantomimes. He believed that using the Home and Away brand would attract this demographic and not only be profitable, but potentially maintain their interest in theatre. Hammond planned the show to be a multi-week touring stage musical that would be capable of playing large venues. He planned that it should be staged during the British summer months to capitalise on the season's heightened business. Hammond's original story plans were for the show to be based on Home and Away's pilot episode and other early episodes.

== Production ==
=== Development and writing ===
Hammond assumed the role of producer and director. Chris Yates was hired as the head of corporate affairs. Production hired five scriptwriters to write the book for the musical. They all had experience writing for soap operas and one worked for the British soap opera EastEnders. Chris Summerfield, who was a musical producer working with Montrose Entertainment was responsible for musical and lyrics, assisted by former BMG Publishing songwriter Olu Rowe . Renato Bartolomeo became an assistant director and Adrian Linford the show's designer. The Albermarle company were hired to create scenery for sets and costume designs. Canadian national Trudy Moffatt assumed the role of the musical's choreographer. She had already gained experience in the field working with Wayne Sleep and Freddie Starr. In May 1991, Steven Sanders, a professional trombonist was hired for the show's band. He had previously worked with Hammond on his production of Snow White, which also featured Home and Away cast members. During the first six months of development, Hammond was met with disbelief from people who doubted a soap opera like Home and Away could be turned into a musical.

Home and Away: The Musical was developed for viewers and fans of soap operas rather than critics. Another aim was to give British theatre audiences more Australian content. Yates told William Cook from The Scotsman that "it's visual, easy listening, anyone who comes to see it from a critical point of view will be wasting their time." Hammond added that it is "soap on stage, we're giving people a piece of Australia." Hammond was loath to take the show to London's West End theatre, believing the show was incompatible with its style. He favoured alternative venues because he believed the show worked better on a regional level.

In the development phase, they received support from the Home and Away executive producer Des Monaghan and staff from the Seven Network in Australia. The show's writing differed from its source material with characters being featured in alternative or new scenarios. In Home and Away, the characters of Ben Lucini and Carly Morris are married. In the musical they are written as being both single again. Sharyn Hodgson who plays Carly in both versions told Mike Smith from Wales On Sunday that "there's no comparison, the characters are different. They have the same names and are in Summer Bay but that's it." Hodgson told Sara Carter from Bracknell Times that the musical itself is unlike the television series. She added "they have just taken some characters from it." Hodgson revealed that all cast members would sing and dance in the musical regardless of their talent. She explained "there is heaps of signing and dancing in the show and I do my bit. But I'm not really a singer." Craig Thomson who plays Martin Dibble revealed that despite being based on Home and Away, the show's style would "certainly" be a musical rather than a soap opera.

The production team viewed hours of original footage from the show. They wanted to recreate locations used in the series on stage. The final concept for the beach set was determined after viewing the footage and studying photographs. The show eventually consisted of two acts complete with fourteen songs. Act one was divided into seven scenes and Act two into six scenes, all with their own location complete with a different set. Locations recreated in the musical which featured in the source material Home and Away were the beach, the diner and the Fletcher's kitchen. One set design which featured during the "Junk Food" musical number featured a giant burger. Costumes decorated in chips were designed for cast members to wear during the performance.

Other scenes featured actual working motorbikes with petrol running their engines. Thomson revealed that they were only allowed a small amount of petrol for safety reasons. This used to last for the duration of the musical number but created a logistic challenge when it ran out and they needed to remove the motorbikes from set. Producers also included a voice over inspired by television continuity announcers. As ITV held the rights to the programme at the time, the voice over stated: "Now on ITV, it's over to Summer Bay for Home and Away."

The show cost £1.6 million to produce and financial backers hoped the show would be one of the musical hits of the 1990s. Hammond also developed plans for a feature film of the musical to be filmed in Cornwall. A soundtrack released on vinyl was also developed. The show was proposed to have another tour in Belgium, where Home and Away was also broadcast, but was also dubbed.

=== Casting and rehearsals ===
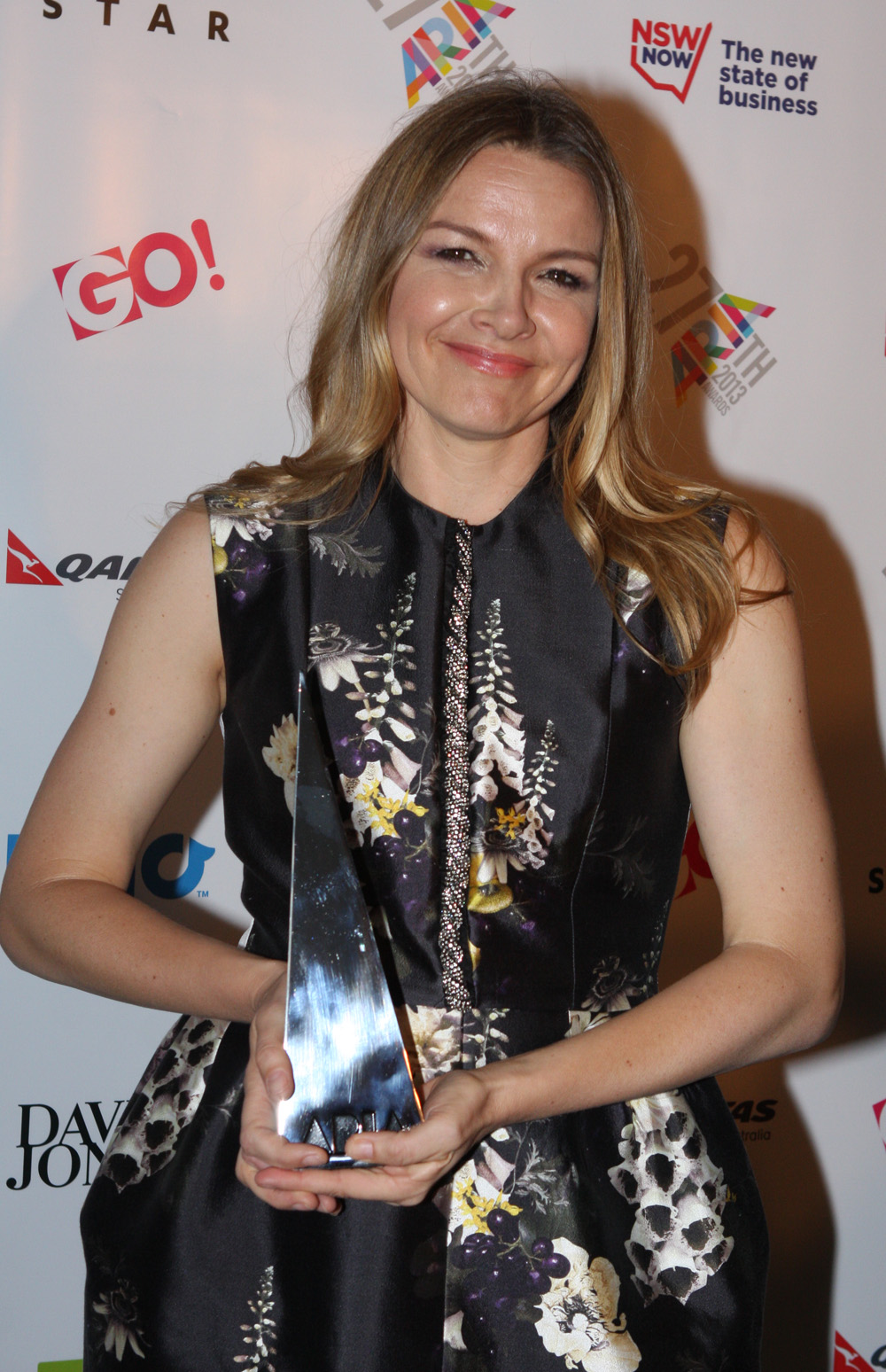
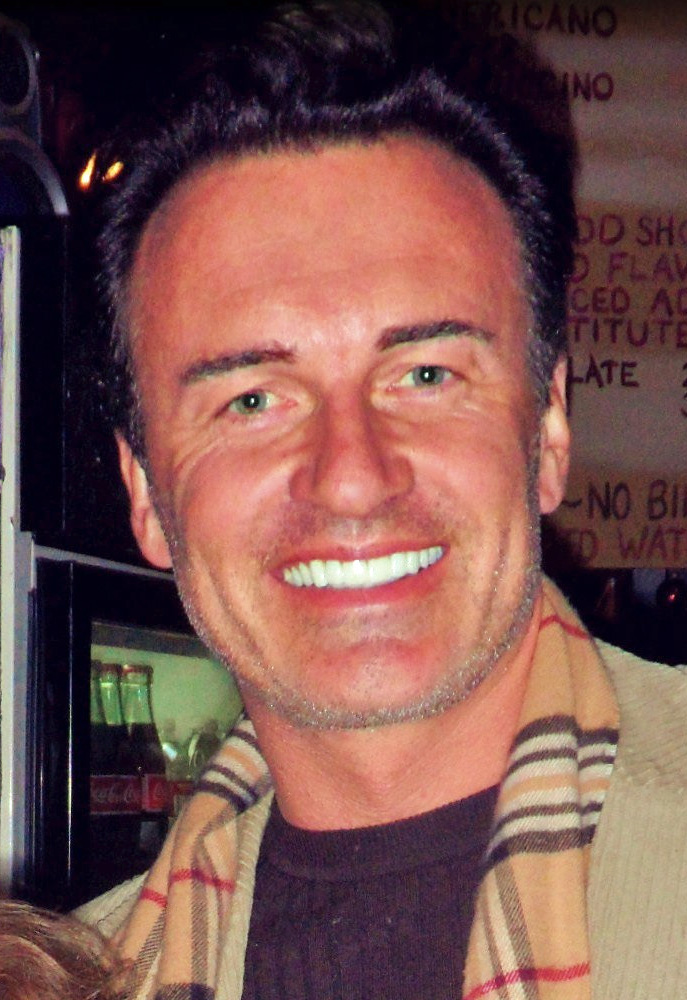
Justine Clarke and Julian McMahon were two of the original Home and Away cast members hired for the musical.

Hammond visited Australia to secure the castings of former Home and Away cast members that he wanted in the show. Only actors who had left Home and Away were able to join the cast. Hammond had already worked with some cast members on Christmas shows and pantomimes. In December 1990, he worked with Justine Clarke, who played Roo Stewart. Clarke was later signed to reprise her role as Roo in Home and Away: The Musical. In addition, Craig Thomson was hired to play his role as Martin Dibble and Mouche Phillips signed up to reprise her Viv Newton role. Sharyn Hodgson reprised her role as Carly and McMahon reprised his role of Ben. However, McMahon's involvement changed and Andrew Kennedy was also cast to play Ben in the show. Adam Willits joined the cast as Steven Matheson at a later date into the show's production. Steven had originally been played by a different actor at the musical earlier runs such as Swansea.

Actor Guy Pearce, who played David Croft in Home and Away was also hired for the musical. It was stated he was unlikely to appear at all shows. When the tour began, Pearce was still filming the role of David in Australia. He appeared during the show's performances in Cornwall, Glasgow, Birmingham. Pearce did not appear in the show's official cast list or promotional materials.

Producers cast Matthew Hall, an actor from Otford, the role of Frank Morgan. Hall changed his stage name to Matthew Cammelle and was credited as such throughout the tour. His casting was publicised on 6 June 1991. Andrew Lawden was cast to play Lance Smart in the production. He was trained in musical theatre and had experience in West End musicals. Lawden's agent put him forward to audition for the experience but he also matched the physical description producers wanted, which helped him secure the role. The role helped Lawden achieve one of his acting ambitions by appearing on stage in Birmingham. To accompany the main cast, Montrose Entertainment hired a chorus of around eighteen British actors, which included the dancers Tim Wilkin and Mitch Rumin. A band consisting of five musicians was formed to support musical numbers. Additional British dancers were hired for the choreographed scenes.

The show featured additional child cast members during its various runs. Montrose Entertainment ran casting calls for their shows for children to appear as extras in the productions. The musical's casting director Ann Molyneux oversaw the auditions. For the show's run at the Festival Theatre in Paignton children aged between nine and fourteen were invited to audition. Molyneux pledged to oversee the first five-hundred attendees for an audition. Despite her pledge, little more than one-hundred auditioned with eight being chosen to appear. For its July run at the Swansea Grand Theatre in Wales, hundreds of hopefuls entered but a limited number were invited to audition. Eight girls aged between nine and twelve were chosen to take part. For the Birmingham run at The Alexandra theatre, more than five-hundred children auditioned with only six, aged twelve to seventeen selected to appear in the shows. Another casting call for the show's Leicester run at the De Montfort Hall. More than one-hundred children auditioned and eight were chosen to appear.

Initial rehearsals for the show were carried out in a community centre in Tunbridge Wells. Home and Away's popularity hindered the rehearsals after viewers discovered the cast were present. The community centre became surrounded with fans and they had to be escorted through a back door and hidden in a van to escape. In between shows the entire cast were transported around the UK via coaches ran via National Express. The show premiered on 10 June 1991 at The Assembly Hall in Tunbridge Wells.

=== Cast absence controversy ===
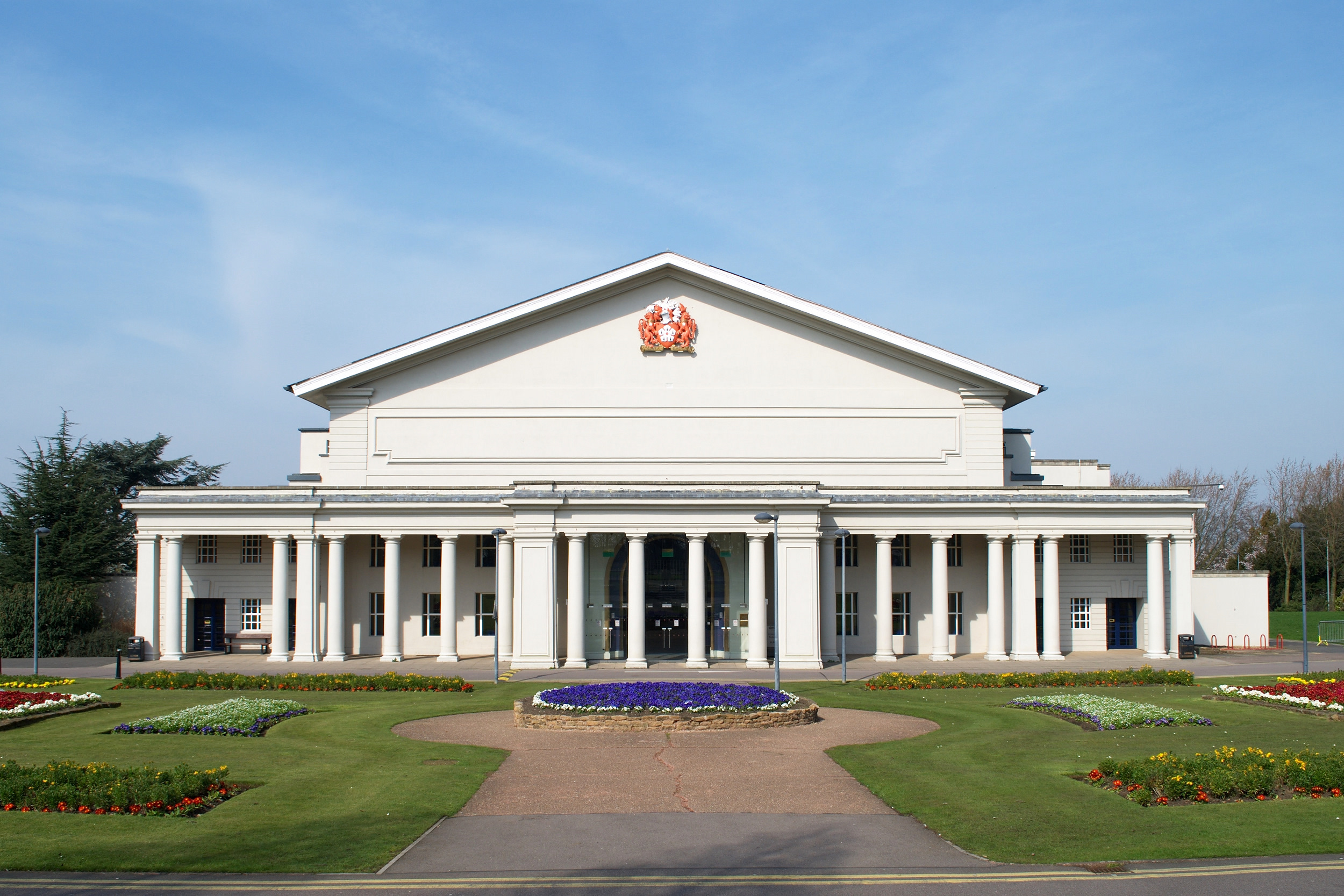
Various cast members failed to attend the show's final performances at the De Montfort Hall in Leicester.

The musical attracted controversy following its final shows. The musical concluded with a run at the De Montfort Hall in Leicester. During the final show, only two cast members from the Home and Away soap opera cast appeared, the first being McMahon. Additional cast members were originally advertised in promotional materials for the run. The show's assistant director Renato Bartolomei had to play the role of Martin during Leicester shows because Thomson left the production. Willits was also absent from the show's final shows. He had been arrested for being drunken and disorderly following a show during its Portsmouth run. Willits had been approached by police outside a hotel room when he got into a fight with officers. Willits had a bruised eye and broken tooth from the altercation. He spent a night in police custody but was released without charge. Upon his release he went to hospital for treatment and at the next tour date wore sunglasses during his performance to hide his injuries. The show's production manager Alan Boyd acknowledged the incident and revealed Willits had been injured during a commotion. Willits later claimed that police were unaware of his identity and accused them of police brutality. Portsmouth police inspector Richard Harding claimed that Willits had been violent and officers acted in self-defence. Willits denied this and claimed officers lied once they learned he was an actor and did not want the negative publicity.

Clarke and Phillips decided to boycott the show's finale performance just ninety minutes before the show was due to start. They had arrived at the venue but then refused to appear because of "contractual problems". More than four-hundred people attended the show and were disappointed by the absence of the four Australian actors. Attendees were so annoyed that they complained to the Leicester City Council. The council's city entertainments manager, David Lingham was angered by the events and opened a formal investigation demanding compensation to ticket holders. Lingham told a reporter from Leicester Daily Mercury that "I sympathise with paying customers. This simply wasn't good enough. We have launched an investigation. We'll get to the bottom of this."

Lingham added that he was in contact with tour promoters to gain compensation for ticket buyers. The show's executive producer Adrian Leggett claimed that Willits and Thomson were not contracted to appear in the finale. This was despite fans claiming they had been led to believe otherwise. Leggett noted that Clarke and Phillips were still under contract and he was investigating their absence. He stated "I'm trying to discover why two stars withdrew at such late notice. I'll be disgusted if they didn't withdraw for valid reasons."

== Credits ==
=== Cast ===
- Justine Clarke as Roo Stewart
- Mouche Phillips as Viv Newton
- Adam Willits as Steven Matheson
- Sharyn Hodgson as Carly Morris
- Julian McMahon and Andrew Kennedy as Ben Lucini
- Matthew Cammelle as Frank Morgan
- Craig Thomson and Renato Bartolomei as Martin Dibble
- Andrew Lawden as Lance Smart
- Karen Heyworth as Gina
- Paul Murphy as Mr Big

=== Chorus ===
- Tony Aiken
- Alison Bish
- Nicky Bolton
- Cherelle Brown
- Karen Butler
- Jenny-Ann Topham
- Mitch Rumin
- Ian Stanley
- Tim Wilkin
- Gerard McIssac

=== Production ===
- Book – Paul Hammond and five others
- Producer – Paul Hammond
- Director – Paul Hammond
- Assistant director – Renato Bartolomei
- Set designer – Adrian Linford
- Musical producer – Chris Summerfield
- Lyrical assistant – Olu Rowe
- Choreographer – Trudy Moffatt
- Assistant choreographer and dance captain – Gerard McIssac
- Corporate affairs – Chris Yates
- Musical director – Mark Docherty
- Photography – Robert Workman
- Marketing – Ann Molyneux
- Production admin – Yvonne Dafter
- Managing director – Barry Clayman
- Executive producer – Adrian Leggett
- Production co-ordinator – Siobhan Houlihan
- Production manager – Kim Robinson
- Booking executive – Tricia Murray-Betts
- PA to executive producer – Jackie Leggett
- Chairman – Basil Critchley
- Production co-ordinator – Sulie Branscombe
- Stage manager – Alan Boyd
- Deputy stage manager – Renato Bartolomei
- Wardrobe mistress – Lily Chapman
- Sound operator – Dave Wooster
- Assistant sound operator – Richard Churton
- Make-up – Paula Mitchell
- Set construction – Albermarle Scenic Studios
- Costumes – Theatre Gear
- Lighting – Stage Electrics
- Sound – Wigwam Acoustics
- Travel – National Express

=== Band ===
- Keyboards – Mark Docherty
- Trumpet – Mark Cumberland
- Drums – Tim Goodyear
- Lead guitar – Steve Harris
- Bass – Andy Hodge
- Saxophone – Alex Moles
- Trombone – Steve Saunders
- 2nd Keyboard – John Saxage

== Promotion and venues ==
To promote the tour, on 6 June 1991, Hammond appeared on Television South show This Way Out, to explain how he created the show. On 8 July 1991, the cast appeared on HTV Wales' show Primetime to discuss the show's Swansea run. The production company ran a competition with the local media to win five VIP meet and greets with the cast. The prize was given prior to a show at The Alexandra theatre in Birmingham on 13 August 1991. Production regularly teamed with local newspapers to run competitions for free tickets. The cast members from the original series also carried out various public appearances to coincide with the shows.

The show toured for seventeen weeks at fourteen British theatre venues. It began on 10 June 1991 at The Assembly Hall in Tunbridge Wells. It concluded on 6 October at De Montford Hall, Leicester. The original schedule was for the final shows was supposed to be 30 September to 5 October 1991.

List of venues and tour dates:
| Dates | Venue | Location | Refs |
|---|---|---|---|
| 10–15 June 1991 | The Assembly Hall | Tunbridge Wells | |
| 17–22 June 1991 | Manchester Opera House | Manchester | |
| 24–29 June 1991 | Congress Theatre | Eastbourne | |
| 1–6 July 1991 | Festival Theatre | Paignton | |
| 8–13 July 1991 | Swansea Grand Theatre | Swansea | |
| 16–27 July 1991. | Glasgow Royal Concert Hall | Glasgow | |
| 30 July-3 August 1991 | Guildford Civic Hall | Guildford | |
| 5–10 August 1991 | Cornwall Coliseum | Carlyon Bay | |
| 12–17 August 1991 | The Alexandra | Birmingham | |
| 19–31 August 1991 | Bradford Alhambra | Bradford | |
| 2–7 September 1991 | Nottingham Royal Concert Hall | Nottingham | |
| 9–14 September 1991 | The Derngate | Northampton | |
| 16–21 September 1991 | Portsmouth Guildhall | Portsmouth | |
| 23–28 September 1991 | Sheffield City Hall | Sheffield | |
| 1–6 October 1991 | De Montfort Hall | Leicester | |

== Reception ==
=== Positive analysis ===
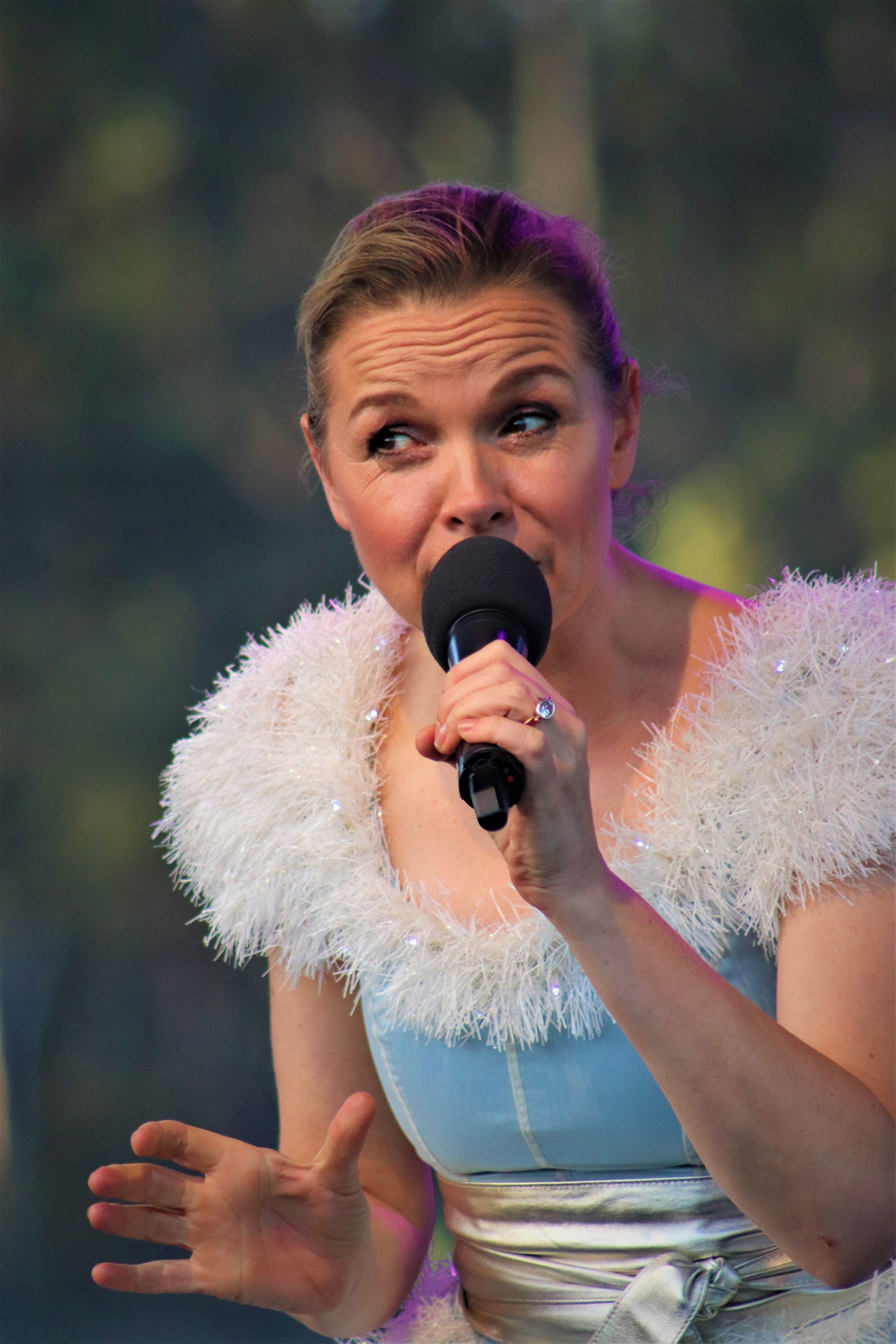
Justine Clarke's performances in the musical were praised by critics.

Pamela Briscoe from Runcorn Weekly News praised the show for bringing "sun, sea and sand" to Manchester. She believed it was an ideal show to introduce children into theatres and likened it to the musical Grease. Briscoe thought it was "energetically choreographed" by Moffatt. She praised the cast's acting and musical abilities which left the audience "thrilled" and "spellbound". Briscoe concluded it was a "surprisingly well acted rendition of life down under". Neil Kerr from Derby Daily Telegraph praised the show reviewing it as a "simple show" that was "well told", complete with "lively dancing and bright singing". He noted that while the musical numbers were not memorable, the cast's "enthusiasm was infectious". Kerr added the musicians were good and did not drown out dialogue from the show's musical numbers. He praised British actors Cammelle and Heyworth's performances and believed they outdid their Australian co-stars with their "fine singing and crisp acting". Kerr's colleague Amanda Volley assessed it had "snappy songs and jaunty little dance routines".

A writer from Rochdale Observer stated that the show "a sunny, sparkling bit of fun to bring a smile to anyone's face." They assessed that musicals adapted from television shows are usually disappointing, but Home and Away: The Musical managed to overcome the trope. They believed that the show gave priority to its musical numbers, rather than storylines which helped its success. The critic concluded that the cast and dancers deserved "the roars of adulation" they received from the audience. Joan Appleton from Nottingham Evening Post reviewed that it was ideal for Home and Away fans. She branded it a "beach rock extravaganza", complete with "all the Summer Bay intrigues".

A writer from Sevenoaks Chronicle claimed they were "dazzled by a vast array of violently coloured beach wear, false tans and peroxide hair." They praised the show's musical numbers and dancing because they "held the show together". Cammelle's vocal performance was hailed as "marvellous" and "impressive", especially in his duet with Clarke. They believed the musical could have been rehearsed more to avoid sound issues and believed that Act 1 was "dull" in comparison to Act 2. A Bracknell Times writer praised Clarke's performance and believed she would have a successful future theatre career.

Peter McGarry from Coventry Evening Telegraph assessed that the musical was "a handful of the younger regulars spinning their true soap-styled philosophies on life." A writer from Nottingham Evening Post described it as "a sort of beach rock with Summer Bay written right through it." They assessed that Summerfield's music "encompasses anything from jazz to ballads and funk."

=== Negative analysis ===
Tony Barrow from The Stage reviewed the show negatively and described it as "simple and childish entertainment" designed for a "juvenile audience". Barrow branded the plot as "weak" and the music neither "catchy" or "at all memorable". He cited "widespread" problems including issues with pace during the first half, poor cast performances failing to convey emotions and potential drama being drained from scenes. He also disliked the constant removal of furniture on stage. He believed the show accurately reproduced "the artistic standards of its source". Barrow thought it was tailored "exclusively" to "the most fanatical and addicted viewers". Barrow praised Cammelle's vocal performance as Frank and the "zestful" choreography from an "otherwise lifeless production". The Scotsman's Cook opined that the show is "custom built for the end of the pier. Its sing along ditties and homespun homilies are as British as the Blackpool illuminations or Brighton rock." He added that the "lurid backdrop of sailboards and surfboards" and wobbly sets made its production standard authentic to the original show. Alan de Pelette, also from The Scotsman, branded it a "even more simplistic effort" than the show itself. He lambasted the show's musical numbers as "primary school arrangements" and described sets of "minimalist props". He also bemoaned the show's writing, acting and singing; concluding it was "two hours of predictable storylines". De Pelette noted the audience enjoyed the shows as they "laughed, cooed and shouted" throughout.

A critic from Newark Advertiser analysed the show's music, writing it was "heavy on rhythm but light on melody and a couple of heart-tuggers." They praised the performance of "Junk Food" as "splendidly staged" and the show's theme song rendition sent shivers down their spine. They criticised the cast's performances, blighted with "cliché" dialogue and scathed that they could have been fooled into thinking the show had never rehearsed and performed numerous times. They believed the show's story was just the characters living in "blameless banality". They concluded that it was "mindless fun", "not proper theatre", "village hall stuff" and "play-acting". Sandra Loy from Torbay Express and South Devon Echo complained that the songs were too loud but the dancing was "very lively". She described the sets as "spectacular and attractive, if unsophisticated" and likened to those seen in television commercials for breakfast cereals. She categorised the show as "musical comedy" and stated that the jokes from Martin and Lance became tiresome. She praised the show for succeeding in giving what "die hard fans" want. Loy concluded that the entire show "could be labelled a stretched pop video, but nevertheless is in a genre of its own."

Kevin Bourke from Manchester Evening News branded it a "dire musical based on the Australian soap." Their colleague Alan Hulme was also unimpressed. He scathed "turn a tacky Australian soap into a stage musical and the result, not unexpectedly, is a very tacky musical." He branded it "shamateurism" and criticised the plot of Mr Big trying to take over the diner as "a particularly daft storyline". He also believed that characters not corresponding to their on-screen counterparts left fans "puzzled". He added that McMahon's version of Ben in the musical had become a "rather embarrassing comic character". He described the music as "rap to rock and onto Barry Manilow style ballads". Hulme concluded that its only positive was it provided British stage actors with employment.

A writer from The Aberdare Leader opined that the musical had a "loose storyline" with "inevitable" outcomes. They criticised the limited number of props used in the production, which they thought was a "surprising aspect". They thought the beach, the diner and the Fletcher family kitchen sets all lacked furniture. They concluded that fans appeared happy because of the presence of original cast members. A critic from Bracknell Times lamented it was "nauseatingly mawkish plot peppered with whopping great coincidences, the trite and tacky dialogue and the sort of acting that would put a half-brick to shame." They blamed a "convoluted storyline" for the lacking performances from the soap opera cast members, opining that they "never seemed to get into the spirit". The critic concluded that they were in "the cynical minority" because everyone enjoyed what was a "very happy show".
