= Selina Cook =

- Home and Away character
- Portrayed by: Tempany Deckert; Louise Crawford (1996)
- Duration: 1994–1998
- First appearance: 5 May 1994
- Last appearance: 30 March 1998
- Introduced by: Andrew Howie (1994); John Holmes (1998)
In-universe information
- Occupation: Student (1994–96); Nurse (1997–)
- Mother: Dawn Cook
- Brothers: Wayne Cook
- Husband: Steven Matheson

Selina Cook (also Roberts) is a fictional character from the Australian Channel Seven soap opera Home and Away, played by Tempany Deckert. She debuted on-screen during the episode airing on 5 May 1994. Deckert was given the role of Selina after her third audition for the show. In 1996, Deckert fell ill and Louise Crawford played Selina in her absence. In 1997, Deckert decided to leave the serial, however briefly returned in 1998. Her return was filmed in Ironbridge, Shropshire, as part of the serial's first ever overseas location filming. Selina's last appearance to date was on 30 March 1998, where she agreed to marry Steven.

Selina was introduced to the show after she developed a crush on her teacher. Selina was portrayed as a tearaway, who had a reputation for being the "town tramp." She often went off the rails, due to arguments with her parents, but she was a good person deep inside. Inside Soap described her as a "tart with a heart who's simply misunderstood." Selina was also a tomboy who regularly dressed in tartan shirts and Doc Martens. Deckert revealed that Selina was supposed to be a clichéd bimbo, so she decided to introduce biker boots to the wardrobe department. Selina later decides to clean up her act and she begins dating Jack Wilson, who she believes is her soul mate. Selina has been central to many "bizarre" storylines such as having a miscarriage at school, being sexually harassed, stalked and entering a relationship with her school teacher Steven Matheson. The character has received mixed reviews from critics. Deckert earned a nomination for "Most Popular Actress" at the Logie Awards, for her portrayal of Selina.

== Casting ==
Deckert auditioned for Home and Away three times in Melbourne. Following her third audition, she was asked to fly to Sydney for a screen test and was told she had the part of Selina. She was asked to return the following day to begin filming and Deckert had to leave her school in order to join the show. In 1996, Deckert fell ill and actress Louise Crawford played Selina during Deckert's temporary absence. In mid-1997, speculation grew around Deckert and whether she had quit the serial, though the Home and Away publicity department did not confirm nor deny her departure. However, Deckert did leave the serial in 1997. She made a brief return to filming in 1998.

== Character development ==
Upon her arrival, Selina was described as being a tearaway with an attitude. Selina also had a reputation for being the "town tramp" and Deckert explained that while it was a pretty true description, it was not exactly Selina's fault. She said "She's a good person deep down even if she is a bit of a slut." Selina had lived in the Bay with her family all her life. She and her parents spent their time arguing rather than discussing their problems, which led to Selina going off the rails.

Deckert told Inside Soap that the reason for Selina's introduction was her crush on teacher Luke Cunningham (John Adam). Selina chases after Luke at the debutante ball, but Luke is not interested in her. Her attempts to seduce him, makes her a household name and reputation falls even further. Selina decides to clean up her act following the fiasco with Luke and she turns out to be a "tart with a heart who's simply misunderstood." Selina begins dating fellow wild child Jack Wilson (Daniel Amalm) and Deckert said that the relationship allowed her to portray Selina's softer side. Of this, she said "It comes as a big surprise to Selina when she realises that she really does like Jack. She's used to chasing anything in trousers! In fact, she finds herself falling in love, especially when she discovers Jack doesn't have any parents - she warms to him and sees him as a real soul mate." While interviewed by the Daily Mirror Deckert said "Selina has always been into boys, in fact, they're her only real interest."

Selina regularly dressed in leather jackets, tartan shirts and Doc Martens. Victoria Ross of Inside Soap opined that Selina had a "passion for dodgy fashion" and was not likely to blend into the background. Deckert said her character was not supposed to be a "real grunge chick" and explained that Selina was going to be a clichéd bimbo. The actress introduced the wardrobe department to biker boots and Selina became a real tomboy. Deckert told The Sun-Herald that some viewers were shocked at her real appearance as they thought Selina looked "like such a dog" in the show.

Selina develops a relationship with Curtis Reed (Shane Ammann). Ammann fell ill in real life so producers forced Deckert to have a blood test following kissing scenes. Although it turned out to be minor, changes to filming were made so their characters would not share many kissing scenes. In one storyline Selina discovers she is pregnant after a fling with Damian Roberts (Matt Doran). Deckert said it was a hard storyline and she was shocked because she had no idea what would happen to Selina. When producers informed her that Selina would miscarry, she was happy she would not have to act the birth scenes out. Selina miscarries in the school corridor and Deckert said it was a surprising element, but disliked having twenty extras watching her perform. Deckert later told a reporter from What's on TV that "she's always been a failure, but being a mum was something she was determined to do well."

Selina had a complicated relationship with her teacher Steven Matheson (Adam Willits). Their romance was rocky and it took many "twists" throughout its progression. Selina left Steven on their wedding day. Deckert said it was a typical soap wedding with plenty of mishaps along the way. A conclusion to their storyline and Deckert's final appearance to date, was filmed in Ironbridge, Shropshire. This was the first occasion the serial had filmed an episode overseas. The storyline saw Irene Roberts (Lynne McGranger) arrive to help Selina recover from malaria. She also reunited Selina with Steven, who arrived pledging his love for her.

== Storylines ==
Selina develops a crush on her teacher Luke Cunningham and is known for an allegedly promiscuous nature. Jack Wilson is attracted to her and they begin dating and attend the school formal together. While sharing a kiss at the dance, they accidentally end up tipping paint over principal Donald Fisher (Norman Coburn) and his date Irene. Selina's mother, Dawn (Kim Deacon) tells her they are moving away. Selina offers to sleep with Jack before she leaves, but he tells her she does not have to. Several weeks later, Selina runs away and asks Irene to take her in. Irene cannot officially foster her but the Department of Child Care Services agree she can stay with Irene. Selina discovers that Jack is already dating another girl, Sonia Johnson (Eva Matuik) and punches him. Selina and Jack later resume their relationship but Jack continues to see Sonia and also begins dating Frankie Brooks (Lenka Kripac). When the girls discover Jack's three-timing, they concoct a revenge plan which leaves Jack humiliated in the caravan park but nothing but his boxers.

Selina begins looking for a new boyfriend and sets her sights on Curtis. Shannon (Isla Fisher), Curtis' adopted sister and girlfriend is annoyed and this and they fight at a party. Rob Storey (Matthew Lilley) turns a hose on them in order to break it up. Selina backs off and she and Shannon become good friends. Selina briefly dates Irene's nephew, Nelson McFarlane (Laurence Bruels). Irene's son Damian arrives for Shane Parrish (Dieter Brummer) and Angel Brooks' (Melissa George) wedding and Selina is attracted to him. They sleep together and Selina later discovers she is pregnant. Neither are ready for parenthood, so Selina decides to put the baby up for adoption and call her Maddie upon birth. However, Selina later suffers a miscarriage.

Curtis and Selina begin dating. On a school trip, Selina stops classmate Joe Lynch (Justin Rosniak) from running away after a bullying incident but this results in Donald finding her with Joe, Jack and Curtis in the boys' dorm. Donald cancels the trip and Selina exacerbates the situation by arguing with him. He tries to unsuccessfully have her expelled and is forced to reinstate her. Selina is later elected school captain and changes her name by deed poll to Roberts. Irene reconciles with her estranged husband, Murdoch (Tom Richards), he begins sexually harassing Selina. Irene discovers the truth and throws Murdoch out. After Murdoch's body is found after a bushfire, Irene and Selina find themselves suspects for his murder but are cleared. Selina has a near-death experience when she is stung in the throat by a bee and has strange visions, including her baby crying and a prophetic projection of Steven and Brian "Dodge" Forbes (Kelly Dingwall) fighting and falling over a cliff ledge. Selina later ends things with Curtis after this incident, because Curtis found her story to be too unbelievable.

Saul Bennett (David Ritchie) becomes obsessed with her and tells her if she has a child with him Maddie would be reincarnated. Irene, Shannon and Alex Bennett (Nick Freedman) all try to prevent her from being brainwashed by Saul. She eventually comes to her senses which results in Saul kidnapping her until Alex saves her. When Selina finds an abandoned baby called Millie on the beach, she is convinced it is fate. The Baby's father, Brendan Coyne (Billy Mitchell) turns up and takes a liking to Selina and suggests they raise Millie together, Selina turns him down and he leaves. Selina is stalked and has her underwear and other items stolen, Selina believes Curtis is responsible. Curtis had caught the real stalker and kept his identity a secret. Selina has an affair with her teacher Steven. They acknowledge they have feelings for each other but realise their romance is forbidden whilst she is at school. Selina then befriends her classmate Jeremy Riggs (David Stanley), until she discovered he had been her stalker. When Jeremy finds out about her and Steven, he tries to blackmail her into going out with him and when Selina rejects him he makes a suicide attempt by hanging himself in the school toilet. Not long after, Irene also finds out about Selina and Steven and makes a complaint. After an investigation Steven is forced to resign and leaves the area. Selina begins dating former criminal Jesse McGregor (Ben Unwin) and he agrees to change his ways. Selina later bonds with Jesse's daughter Rachel (Kelly Glaister). When Jesse kisses Chloe Richards (Kristy Wright), she refuses to forgive them at first but later resumes her relationship with Jesse and friendship with Chloe.

Irene's grandson, Paul is kidnapped, so Selina and Joey Rainbow (Alex O'Han) both visit Saul's commune to find out the truth. Selina is imprisoned in a room that is set on fire. Jesse and Joey rescue her and Saul is presumed dead. Selina begins studying nursing at University and is placed at Northern Districts' hospital. Selina is shocked to discovers that the hospital's computer repairman is Steven. He makes it clear he still loves Selina but she is still with Jesse. However, Selina cannot deny her feelings for Steven and they end up back together before she agrees to marry him. Irene is against the union, but is eventually changes her mind. On her way to the wedding, the limousine disappears. Saul turns out to be the driver and kidnaps Selina for the third time. When Saul falls ill, Selina chooses to stay with him rather than using the chance to escape. The police later corner Saul and Constable Terri Garner (Alyson Standen) shoots Saul dead after believing he was armed. Selina is shaken by this and tells Steven she is not ready to marry him and leaves the Bay to travel. Selina contracts malaria whilst in Africa and is brought Ironbridge by Geoffrey Burns (Ben Price) to convalesce. Irene and Marilyn Chambers (Emily Symons) fly over to help care for her and Irene calls Steven. He and Selina rekindle their relationship and she agrees to marry him and let him travel with her.

== Reception ==
For her portrayal of Selina, Deckert was nominated for "Most Popular Actress" at the 1997 Logie Awards. Later that year she was nominated for "Best Actress" at the Inside Soap Awards. Deckert said many viewers felt sorry for Selina because of all the trauma she had faced in her life. She added that she had done some of the "weirdest" acting thanks to Selina's "bizarre life." Dave Lanning writing for The People questioned whether Australia had child welfare when "slinky Selina" found a baby on the beach and kept it. The Birmingham Post said Selina being kidnapped on her wedding day was a "bizarre storyline." The Newcastle Herald included the 1998 episode of Home and Away, in which Selina and Steven returned in their "TV Highlights" feature.

Simon Hughes writing for The Age said the serial was like a "pedophile's paradise" and that Selina's storyline with Murdoch highlighted this. He opined that Selina's predicament should not be underestimated, and observed Selina as being a "typical adolescent" because she "rolls her eyes, sneers and pouts and purses her lips." He concluded that Home and Away's make-up department made her look like a "Puerto Rican whore in a school dress." In Dr. Glyn Davis and Kay Dickinson's book Teen TV: genre, consumption, identity, they said teenage oriented television in the 1990s portrayed many characters appearing to snub university, using Selina as one of their examples. A writer from What's on TV stated that Selina losing her baby was one of her most heart-breaking moments; adding "Selina Cook has suffered her fair share of knocks."
