= Viv Newton =

- Home and Away character
- Portrayed by: Mouche Phillips
- Duration: 1989–90
- First appearance: 5 July 1989
- Last appearance: 25 May 1990
- Introduced by: Des Monaghan
In-universe information
- Occupation: Student
- Father: John Newton
- Mother: Angela Newton
- Sisters: Tamar Newton

Aviva "Viv" Newton is a fictional character from the Australian television soap opera Home and Away, played by Mouche Phillips. She made her first appearance during the episode broadcast on 5 July 1989. Phillips audition for the role and informed her she had been successful via an answering machine message. She began filming the same week but Phillips was immediately unhappy with her experience. Viv was written out of the series the following year and she made her final appearance during the episode broadcast on 25 May 1990. Phillips later revealed that she found the role to be unchallenging and the show's writing repetitive. Phillips reprised the role in 1991, for the UK theatre tour of Home and Away: The Musical.

== Casting ==
When Phillips auditioned for the role of Viv she was living with established cast member Justine Clarke, who plays Roo Stewart. The producers left a message on Phillips answering machine telling her she had the part. Phillips said that she began filming the same week that Clarke finished filming and felt like they were doing a swap. Phillips said that her first day of filming was "dreadful". She told TV Week that "I felt like I was just warming up in a scene and they'd say 'done!'". Phillips told a writer from Look-in that she liked to be kept busy on set. She explained that "people" were often left trying to find her because she was not where she should have been.

== Development ==
Karen Krizanovich from TV Guide opined that the character had been created specifically to "bring a little glamour to the day-to-day lives at Summer Bay". In the Home and Away – Official Collector’s Edition a writer described Viv as a "feisty and beautiful" character. In one storyline Viv dates Matt Wilson (Greg Benson). They later break up because Matt is romancing other women and she gets back together with Steven Matheson (Adam Willits). In his book The who's who of soap operas; Anthony Howard said that Steven did not have the same sex appeal as Matt, but he was more "loving and reliable" to Viv.

The character was written out of Home and Away during 1990. Phillips told Graeme Kay from BIG! that the role had taken up too much of her time and she preferred having a free schedule. Viv's final storyline featured her missing sister, Tammy Newton (Katy Edwards) returning unharmed. The pair then decide to move to the countryside with their mother. Phillips told Ian Brandes from The People that she only opted to appear in Home and Away because it would help her career. She lambasted the show's repetitive writing and storylines. She explained "it wasn't at all challenging. It's such throw away stuff. I'm not saying I didn't have to act in it but being an actor is all about doing different things." Phillips disliked her experience working on the show so intensely that she considered giving up acting.

Phillips reprised the role in the 1991 theatre production, Home and Away: The Musical. The musical theatre show cost the production team £1.6 million to stage. It featured Phillips as Viv, Craig Thomson as Martin Dibble, Julian McMahon as Ben Lucini, Sharyn Hodgson as Carly Morris and Justine Clarke as Roo Stewart. It toured UK theatre venues during 1991. The tour lasted seventeen weeks and finished with a five day run in Leicester. Phillips and Clarke refused to appear in the show's finale because of contractual disputes with organisers. The show took place in De Montfort Hall, Leicester without the two actresses. Their absence caused attendees to lodge complaints to the Leicester City Council. The council's city entertainments manager, David Lingham was angered by the events and opened a formal investigation demanding compensation to ticket holders.

== Storylines ==
Viv meets Steven Matheson and Brian 'Dodge' Forbes (Kelly Dingwall) while they are in the city. Viv reveals she is running from her abusive father John (John Gregg), who is a reverend and Steven and Dodge take her back to Summer Bay. Lance Smart (Peter Vroom) and his mother, Colleen (Lyn Collingwood) agree to cover for Viv and lie that she is a relative staying with them.

The truth is revealed and John turns up looking for Viv and charms everybody. John manipulates Viv by using her younger sister, Tammy in order to guilt trip her into returning home and she does. Once home, John locks Viv in a cupboard under the stairs. Tammy rescues her and phones Steven. Steven and Bobby Simpson (Nicolle Dickson) arrive to rescue Viv and Tammy and lock John in the cupboard as a taste of his own medicine and flee back to the bay. Bobby asks her father Donald Fisher (Norman Coburn) to let Viv and Tammy stay. Once Donald learns of John's true nature, he contacts Howard West (Richard Rowe), a representative of the Department of Child Services who offers Viv and Tammy the choice of going into a children's home or remaining with John under a supervision order. Tammy reluctantly agrees to return home while Viv remains with Donald and Bobby.

Viv finds herself the target of school bully Vicki Baxter (Nana Coburn) due to Donald being her headmaster as well as guardian. She then finds an ally in the newly arrived Emma Jackson (Dannii Minogue) who leads her into trouble and encourages her to rebel. While wagging school one afternoon, Viv and Emma hitch a ride with two unknown men who attempt to rape them but are quickly saved by Steven and Alf Stewart (Ray Meagher). Viv and Steven begin dating but Viv is afraid Steven wants to go further. Vicki tries to drive a wedge between the two but is unsuccessful.

Viv soon discovers that Tammy has fled their father and is on her way to Summer Bay and spends several days looking for her. Tammy is found and the sisters are reunited. Helen Wakefield (Shayne Foote), a social worker is able to locate Viv and Tammy's mother, Angela (Annie Byron) and brings her to meet her estranged daughters. Viv and Tammy are shocked as John had told them Angela had died. Angela explains that she left when Tammy was a baby and has been working on a lavender farm in Queensland. After a nervous reunion, the Newtons prepare to leave the bay and Viv and Steven agree to keep in contact. Viv later writes Steven a letter breaking off their relationship.

== Reception ==
Ian Brandes from The People opined that the role made Phillips career. He branded Viv a "teenage tearaway" type of character. A writer from Stockport Express Advertiser described the character as a "Summer Bay starlet" and remembered her as "Steven's long distance girlfriend, the one who was beaten up by her vicar dad."
