= List of Home and Away characters introduced in 1989 =

Home and Away is an Australian television soap opera. It was first broadcast on the Seven Network on 17 January 1988. The following is a list of characters that first appeared in 1989, by order of first appearance. They were all introduced by the show's executive producer Des Monaghan. The 2nd season of Home and Away began airing on 23 January 1989. The first introduction of the year was Martha Stewart in January. Nana Coburn made her first appearance as schoolgirl Vicki Baxter the following month. Rebecca Fisher made her first appearance in April. Emily Symons joined the cast as Marilyn Chambers in May. In June, the serial saw the birth of Duncan Stewart, the first child of Alf and Ailsa. Mat Stevenson took on the role of Adam Cameron a fortnight later. Mouche Phillips joined as Viv Newton in July, and September saw the arrival of Dannii Minogue as Emma Jackson.

== Opening titles timeline ==
Color key
Main cast (opening credits)
Recurring guest star (closing credits in 3+ episodes)
Guest star (closing credits in 1–2 episodes)

Character	Actor	1988–89	1989				1989–90
Character	Actor	161–260	261–340	341–350	351–400	401–435	436–470
Tom Fletcher	Roger Oakley	M	M	M	M	M	M
Pippa Fletcher	Vanessa Downing	M	M	M	M	M	M
Steven Matheson	Adam Willits	M	M	M	M	M	M
Frank Morgan	Alex Papps	M	M				
Carly Morris	Sharyn Hodgson	M	M	M	M	M	M
Sally Fletcher	Kate Ritchie	M	M	M	M	M	M
Ailsa Stewart	Judy Nunn	M	M	M	M	M	M
Alf Stewart	Ray Meagher	M	M	M	M	M	M
Neville McPhee	Frank Lloyd	M					
Floss McPhee	Sheila Kennelly	M					
Bobby Simpson	Nicolle Dickson	M	M	M	M	M	M
Roo Stewart	Justine Clarke	M	M	G			
Martin Dibble	Craig Thomson	M	M	M	M	M	M
Lance Smart	Peter Vroom	M	M	M	M	M	M
Donald Fisher	Norman Coburn	M	M	M	M	M	M
Celia Stewart	Fiona Spence	M	M	M	M	M	M
Morag Bellingham	Cornelia Frances	R	M	M	M	M	
Viv Newton	Mouche Phillips			M	M	M	M
Adam Cameron	Mat Stevenson		G	M	M	M	M
Marilyn Chambers	Emily Symons		R	R	M	(Note: Despite leaving the show, Symons was accidentally restored to the opening credits for episode 405.)	R
Emma Jackson	Dannii Minogue				G	M	M
Matt Wilson	Greg Benson	R	R	R	R	M	M

== Martha Stewart ==
Martha Stewart
- Home and Away character
- Portrayed by: Alison Mulvaney (1989); Belinda Giblin (2018–2022)
- Duration: 1989, 2018–2022
- First appearance: 25 January 1989
- Last appearance: 2 June 2022
- Introduced by: Des Monaghan (1989); Lucy Addario (2018)
In-universe information
- Other names: Martha Baldivis
- Occupation: Artist
- Father: Jack Baldivis
- Mother: Sarah Baldivis
- Husband: Alf Stewart (1969–1985, 2020–)
- Sons: Kieran Baldivis
- Daughters: Roo Stewart
- Granddaughters: Martha MacKenzie

Martha Stewart initially appeared from 25 January to 13 February 1989, played by Alison Mulvaney. Martha was introduced as Alf Stewart's (Ray Meagher) first wife through a series of flashbacks. The character was reintroduced on 27 March 2018, and the role was recast to Belinda Giblin, who previously played Cynthia Ross in 1991. Meagher told Simon Timblick of the Radio Times that he may have suggested Giblin for the role, saying "When it was first mentioned to me they were thinking about bringing Martha back, they hadn't started looking and I said Belinda would be terrific. I don't know whether they looked any further, it was the perfect choice." Martha has the longest gap between appearances of any character on Home and Away.

Martha was reintroduced as part of the show's 30th anniversary celebrations. Alf tells their daughter Roo Stewart (Georgie Parker) that Martha did not die as previously thought, but she had in fact disappeared as she was unhappy with her life. Roo tries to find her mother, but is unsuccessful, until Martha makes her own way to Summer Bay. The character returns the following year, after receiving a phone call from Alf, which leads them to reconcile romantically. Meagher thought that Martha was probably the love of his life, despite his marriage to Ailsa Stewart (Judy Nunn). He also joked about that Martha being alive may have made Alf a bigamist. Martha temporarily leaves after her borderline personality disorder causes her anxiety.

Martha was married to Alf Stewart and is the mother of their daughter, Ruth "Roo" Stewart (then Justine Clarke). She was presumed drowned after a sailing accident in 1985. Martha appears in flashbacks when Bobby Simpson (Nicolle Dickson) reads her diary entries while searching for leads on her biological parents. It is revealed that Martha knew that Alf's sister, Morag Bellingham (Cornelia Frances) was Bobby's mother and subsequently had her adopted out to Al (George Leppard; Terence Donovan) and Doris Simpson.

Decades later, when he thinks he is going to die following an explosion, Alf tells Roo that Martha did not drown, as Roo had been led to believe, and is still alive. Martha comes to Summer Bay House and meets Ryder Jackson (Lukas Radovich), who asks if she wants to rent a caravan from Alf. She leaves, but later returns and comes face-to-face with Alf and then Roo. Martha explains that a friend informed her Roo had come looking for her. Roo and Martha talk, but when Roo asks why Martha left her all those years ago, Martha tells her she is tired and leaves. Martha later reveals that she has borderline personality disorder. She struggled to connect with Roo and could not face up to her condition, so she left. After seeking help and treatment, the guilt and fear stopped her from coming back, but she knew Roo would have a good life. Roo tells Martha that she gave Alf a hard time and had a daughter when she was sixteen, who she named after Martha. Roo asks Martha to have dinner with Alf, but she fails to show up. The following day, Martha comes to Summer Bay House to leave her contact details for Roo and she apologises to Alf, before explaining why she left. Roo tells Martha that she needs to leave, as her presence is hurting Alf, but she will visit her.

Months later, Alf calls Martha, but does not tell her why and soon hangs up on her. Martha comes to the Bay to ask him why he contacted her, but he tells her to go home. Alf later admits that he has missed her. He takes her out on his boat and Martha paints his portrait. She admits that she loves him and Alf is short with her, but after catching Martha packing her bags, they agree to see where things go between them. When Martha struggles to contact Roo, who is teaching in a remote area, she panics and works herself into a state. After Roo finally gets in contact, Martha calms down and explains to Alf that the anxiety is a result of her BPD. She decides to return home, and Alf later joins her. Upon their return to the Bay, they tell Roo that they are in a relationship. Martha leaves a few days later, having explained that she will continue to live in Marimbula. During her next visit to the Bay, Martha tells Roo that she is back to stay and Alf asks her to move in with him, which she later accepts. Martha initially struggles with the move and talks with Alex Neilson (Zoe Ventoura) about her mental health. Alex refers her to a specialist at the local hospital. After returning home from a trip, Alf and Martha learn that Mason Morgan (Orpheus Pledger) and Robbo (Jake Ryan) have died, which prompts Alf to suggest that they get married again. Martha initially turns him down, as she does not think he is being sincere, so Alf proposes properly and she accepts. They are married a week later and leave the Bay to visit Alf's sisters. Martha continues to maintain a home and studio in Marimbula, which causes tension between the couple when Alf wants Martha to sell up. Martha tells Roo that her home in Merimbula is the place she goes to heal when she suffers from BPD. She also tells Alf that it is her safety net and they make up. Martha is contacted by her son Kieran Baldivis (Rick Donald) and she confides in Irene Roberts (Lynne McGranger) about him. She decides to go to Merimbula to see him and tell him about her marriage to Alf. On her return to the Bay, she tells Alf about Kieran. He asks whether she would have told him if Kieran had not contacted her, but realises she probably would not have done. Martha then tells Roo that she has a half-brother, and explains that their relationship is complicated and he has not been in her life for a number of years. Martha admits to Alf and Roo that she was terrified she was going to lose them if they knew about Kieran. She also tells them that Kieran is keen to meet them and he soon shows up in the Bay.

Martha continues to live in Merimbula with Alf going over for frequent visits.

== Vicki Baxter ==
Vicki Baxter
- Home and Away character
- Portrayed by: Nana Coburn
- Duration: 1989–1990
- First appearance: 22 February 1989
- Last appearance: 9 August 1990
- Introduced by: Des Monaghan
In-universe information
- Occupation: Student
- Father: Len Baxter
- First cousins: Anna

Vicki Baxter, played by Nana Coburn, made her first appearance on 22 February 1989. Coburn's father Norman Coburn also appeared in the serial as headmaster Donald Fisher. David Brown of TV Week called Vicki "Summer Bay's resident trouble-maker". Coburn admitted she was not a fan of her character when she joined the show, explaining "I think everyone prefers to play a character who is liked, but after a while I enjoyed being nasty." Coburn appeared on "a semi-regular basis" and she filmed her final scenes for Home and Away in June 1990. She stated "It's been wonderful. It kept me in regular work and I think I've learnt a lot." She particularly enjoyed filming a fight scene with Dannii Minogue during her last days on set.

Vicki is an antagonist in Steven Matheson's (Adam Willits) class at Summer Bay High. She pokes fun at Carly Morris (Sharyn Hodgson) for repeating Year 12 after failing her HSC the previous year and begins bullying Viv Newton (Mouche Phillips). Vicki also frequently feuds with Emma Jackson (Minogue). When Grant Mitchell (Craig McLachlan) begins teaching at the school, Vicki makes a play for him asking for after school tuition. Grant rejects her advances and Vicki tells everyone that he sexually molested her, resulting in Grant's suspension pending an investigation. Emma is enraged and uses physical force to get Vicki to confess. She eventually confesses and Grant is reinstated. Vicki then frames Emma for stealing exam papers from Donald Fisher's office, which sees her expelled. Steven and Paul Jensen (Craig Black) work together in order to bring Vicki down by contacting her cousin Anna (Rebecca George), who informs them of Vicki's scheme. After being confronted with the evidence, Vicki herself is expelled from school.

== Rebecca Fisher ==
Rebecca Fisher, played by Jane Hall, made her first appearance on 3 April 1989. Rebecca was introduced as the daughter of school principal Donald Fisher (Norman Coburn). While she is visiting Summer Bay, she becomes a love interest for Steven Matheson (Adam Willits). Producers liked how well Willits and Hall worked together and thought about bringing her character back periodically. The role was later recast to Danielle Carter when the character returned in 1994. Carter was contracted for a seven week stint. Two years later, producers reintroduced the character with Belinda Emmett in the role. Emmett's portrayal of Rebecca earned her a nomination for the Logie Award for Most Popular New Talent in 1997. She received a nomination for Most Popular Actress in 1998 and 1999, as well as the Gold Logie.

== Marilyn Chambers ==
Marilyn Chambers, played by Emily Symons, debuted on screen during the episode airing on 18 May 1989. Symons departed the serial in 1992 but returned in 1995 for another regular stint which lasted until 1999. Dannii Minogue originally auditioned for the role of Marilyn, but she was given the role of Emma Jackson and Emily Symons was cast as Marilyn instead. Holy Soap called her "bubbly" and a "Dizzy blonde beautician".

== Duncan Stewart ==
Duncan Stewart made his first appearance in during the episode airing on 14 June 1989. Brendan McKensy's portrayal of Duncan earned him a nomination for Best Young Actor at the 1999 Inside Soap Awards.

== Adam Cameron ==
Adam Cameron, played by Mat Stevenson, debuted on-screen during the episode airing on 28 June 1989. Stevenson had previously guested on rival soap opera Neighbours on Network Ten as petty criminal Skinner. In an interview with The Sun-Herald, he said that the chance to play Adam was a role-reversal and part in Neighbours helped him become more level-headed. Stevenson chose to move from his native Melbourne to Sydney for filming. Stevenson quit the serial in 1994 Stevenson describes Adam is "a bit of a layabout" who is "capable of a kind word and good deed every now and then". However, Adam would "rather not" do either if doing so "interferes with having a good time or a lazy time". Stevenson said that he liked playing Adam, but noted he was nothing like his character because he is more responsible than Adam is. A columnist for Inside Soap said that Adam is a "one-time joker" and a "happy-go-lucky type of character". Stevenson returned for a guest stint in 1999 and admitted that not much had changed on the series. Stevenson told writer Jason Herbison of Inside Soap that he enjoyed playing Adam again so much that he considered asking the producer for a full-time return.

== Viv Newton ==
Viv Newton, played by Mouche Phillips, made her first appearance in on 5 July 1989 and departed on 25 May 1990. Phillips was sharing a house with Justine Clarke and began filming the week after Clarke had left the serial Phillips told a writer from Look-in that she liked to be kept busy on set. She explained that "people" were often left trying to find her because she was not where she should have been.

== Emma Jackson ==
Emma Jackson, played by Dannii Minogue, made her first on-screen appearance on 22 September 1989 and departed on 22 August 1990. Minogue originally auditioned for the role of Marilyn Chambers, but she was later cast in the role of Emma instead. Minogue stayed with the show for a year, before she quit to launch her music career in 1990. In October 2007, it was rumoured that Minogue was due to reprise her role as Emma for the show's 20th anniversary in 2008. However, she did not appear. For her portrayal of Emma, Minogue was nominated for the "Most Popular Actress on Australian Television" Logie Award in 1989. Holy Soap named Minogue as one of Home and Away's "Sexiest girls ever".

== Others ==
Date(s)	Character	Actor	Circumstances
25 January	Les Palmer	Graham Lancaster	Les is Celia Stewart (Fiona Spence)’s late fiancé who appears in flashbacks to 1970 when Bobby Simpson (Nicolle Dickson) reads the diary entries of Martha Stewart (Alison Mulvaney). Les and Celia hold a party to celebrate their engagement but it is not to be as Les is later killed in the Vietnam War.
26 January–16 March	Nicholas Walsh	Robert Taylor	Nicholas arrives in Summer Bay to visit Stacey Macklin (Sandie Lillingston) and reveals to her ex, Philip Matheson (John Morris) that he and Stacey are engaged. Nicholas goes for a swim and has his clothes stolen and is seen in the nude by Celia Stewart (Fiona Spence) and Betty Falwell (Barbara Morton), who call the police and he is arrested for indecent exposure. He schemes with Stacey's father, Gordon (Ron Haddrick) to buy the caravan park from the Fletcher family but they decline and Nicholas offers Tom (Roger Oakley) a job in England. He urges Morag Bellingham (Cornelia Frances) to buy the park and sell it to him, she agrees. Stacey finds out Nicholas is behind some poison pen letters addressed to Ailsa Stewart (Judy Nunn), which he had framed her stepdaughter Roo (Justine Clarke) for. He chases Stacey and attacks her but Tom saves Stacey and hits Nicholas.
1 February–5 September	Kim Patterson	Jacqui Townsend	Kim is the younger sister of Alison (Kathryn Ridley), Mav (Clayton Williams) and Skye Patterson (Angela Keep). She attends Summer Bay Primary in Year 4 with Sally Fletcher (Kate Ritchie). She tells Alison that Carly Morris (Sharyn Hodgson) is going through cold turkey. Kim and Sally find some floppy disks scattered in the bush, which contain Morag Bellingham's (Cornelia Frances) manuscript for her memoirs. She later argues with Sally over the existence of the "Summer Bay Bunyip" when Sally claims to have seen the creature.
13 February–20 March	Richard Bellingham	John Bonney	Richard is Morag Bellingham’s (Cornelia Frances) husband of Twenty years. They separate after the truth about Morag being Bobby Simpson’s (Nicolle Dickson) mother is exposed in the local news. Before he leaves, he warns Morag's niece Roo Stewart (Justine Clarke) that she should stay away from her aunt.
20 February–21 November	James Donahue	Richard Morgan	Donahue is a journalist from The Daily Star who tries to get information about Morag Bellingham (Cornelia Frances) being the mother of Bobby Simpson (Nicolle Dickson). He tricks Morag's sister, Celia Stewart (Fiona Spence) into revealing details. He is warned off by Alf Stewart (Ray Meagher) but returns when he learns Rory Heywood (Gregor Jordan) has been killed by a shark. Donahue persuades Lance Smart (Peter Vroom) to lie about the sighting of the shark.
22 February–5 April	Leanne Dunn	Kylie Foster	Leanne is a girl who Martin Dibble (Craig Thomson) meets on a blind date. She asks Celia Stewart (Fiona Spence) for etiquette lessons. Leanne's new image is a shock for Martin who wants to dump her. Leanne misinterprets his signals and thinks he wants to marry her. Martin tries to put her off by introducing her to his rough family and behaving like a slob. Leanne then reverts to her old image and she and Martin continue their relationship. Matt Wilson (Greg Benson) discovers Leanne is illiterate and teaches her to read. Martin assumes Matt is seeing Leanne and goes to attack Matt, resulting in Martin being knocked out. Meat Axe (Joseph Dicker), Leanne's ex-boyfriend, shows up and picks a fight with Martin and beats him up. Leanne stops the fight but she leaves with Meat Axe, breaking Martin's heart.
1 March–12 November	Enid	Jan Oxenbould	Enid is a friend of Celia Stewart (Fiona Spence) who attends a town meeting about a killer shark inhabiting the waters near the beach.
8 March	Nola Dibble	Denise Roberts	Nola is Martin Dibble's (Craig Thomson) mother who appears when he brings Leanne Dunn (Kylie Foster) to meet the family for dinner in order to put her off marrying him.
8 March	Scott Dibble	Uncredited	Scott and Errol are Martin Dibble's (Craig Thomson) brothers. They appear at a family meal when Martin brings Leanne Dunn to meet them and their parents Ern (Peter Carmody) and Nola (Denise Roberts).
8 March	Errol Dibble	Uncredited	Scott and Errol are Martin Dibble's (Craig Thomson) brothers. They appear at a family meal when Martin brings Leanne Dunn to meet them and their parents Ern (Peter Carmody) and Nola (Denise Roberts).
21 March–24 May	Nigel Taggart	Gary Down	Nigel is a colleague of Morag Bellingham (Cornelia Frances) who she had hired several years before when nobody would due to him losing his eyesight in an accident. He arrives to help her at the Blaxland mansion as her personal assistant. He often serves as a mediator and builds up a friendship with Morag's sister Celia Stewart (Fiona Spence). Celia develops feelings for Nigel but he does not reciprocate. Nigel resigns as Morag's assistance in order to get some independence and with the help of Ailsa Stewart (Judy Nunn), he leaves Celia a letter letting her down gently.
28 March	Ross Maybury	John Banas	Ross is the presenter of 'The World Tonight' a late night talk-show which Donald Fisher (Norman Coburn) and Bobby Simpson (Nicolle Dickson) appear on to discuss On the Crest of a Wave, a novel by Donald's son Alan (Simon Kay). Ross asks Bobby about the recently publicised revelation that Morag Bellingham (Cornelia Frances) is her mother and upsets her.
4–5 April	Meat Axe	Joseph Dicker	Meat Axe is Leanne Dunn's (Kylie Foster) ex-boyfriend who arrives in Summer Bay to get back together with her. He is angry to find Martin Dibble (Craig Thomson) is dating Leanne and challenges him to a fight. Meat Axe delivers a beating to Martin but is stopped when Leanne breaks a bottle over his head. However, Leanne leaves with Meat Axe after admitting to Martin she promised to go with him.
18 April–17 August 1989, 8 September–23 October 1995	Brian "Dodge" Forbes	Kelly Dingwall	Dodge arrives in Summer Bay and schemes to get free food from Celia Stewart (Fiona Spence) at the local store. He also steals Bobby Simpson’s money (Nicolle Dickson) while she is on the beach. After Lance Smart (Peter Vroom) catches Dodge trying to steal his car, he spins him a story about being broke and homeless, and Lance lets him stay in his mobile home. Dodge continues to cause trouble in the Bay by stealing money from the school dance and Philip Matheson’s (John Morris) pills. Celia catches him trying to steal from the store and he is arrested by Sgt. Bob Barnett (Robert Baxter). Dodge retaliates by firebombing the store, which results in Philip being killed. He then leaves town but returns as the latest foster child of the Fletcher family. He builds up a friendship with Philip's nephew Steven (Adam Willits) and convinces him to frame Simon Yates (Christopher Saunders) for arson. Dodge clashes with Tom and Pippa's adoptive daughter Sally Fletcher (Kate Ritchie) and begins bullying her about her imaginary friend, Milco. An upset Sally has an outburst and shouts that Milco doesn't exist anymore. Dodge then encourages Steven into bad behaviour. Things come undone when Dodge drunkenly confesses to Adam Cameron (Mat Stevenson) that he burned the store down. Steven is enraged and realises that Dodge killed Uncle Philip. He attacks Dodge, but Donald Fisher (Norman Coburn) stops him. Dodge is arrested, charged with murder, and imprisoned for the next 5 to 6 years. Dodge is paroled in 1995, murders Irene's husband 'Mud' (Murdoch Roberts), and returns Summer Bay to even the score, by framing Steven for murder. He kidnaps Kelly Watson (Katrina Hobbs) to lure Steven into a fight with him on a clifftop and plunge into the sea below. Shane Parrish (Dieter Brummer) rescues Steven, but Dodge's body is never found.
20 April–16 May	Simon Yates	Christopher Saunders	Simon meets Roo Stewart (Justine Clarke) at a Dirty Dancing competition and takes a liking to her. Simon takes a job at the Bayside diner. It is revealed he served a prison sentence for armed robbery but Roo is not deterred and they continue their relationship, despite Roo's aunt Morag Bellingham's (Cornelia Frances) warnings about Simon. Steven Matheson (Adam Willits) is convinced Simon is behind the fire that recently killed his uncle Philip (John Morris) and attacks him. Simon leaves but briefly returns and begins working for Roo's father Alf (Ray Meagher) but Steven continues his harassment of Simon and is goaded by Brian "Dodge Forbes (Kelly Dingwall) into framing him for arson. Simon is arrested and bailed at Alf's expense but he runs away. Simon later sends Roo a letter saying he will pay Alf back.
2–9 May	Andrew Foley Senior	Alan Tobin	Andrew Senior is Andrew Foley's (Peter Bensley) estranged father. The two men have not spoken since the death of Andrew’s mother, Julia. Andrew Senior is dying and wants to make peace with his son and asks Carly Morris (Sharyn Hodgson) to set up a meeting but Andrew refuses. Andrew Senior finally gets to see his son but he warns him to stay away from him. Andrew Senior later dies but leaves Andrew a great deal of money in his will and a letter full of apologies.
10 May 1989 – 22 February 1990	Howard West	Richard Rowe	West is a representative of the Department of Childcare Services. He brings Brian “Dodge” Forbes (Kelly Dingwall) to the Fletchers as their newest foster child. He investigates Viv Newton’s (Mouche Phillips) claims of her father John’s (John Gregg) mistreatment of her and her sister Tammy (Katy Edwards). John manages to get West onside, however, West organises a temporary supervision order for Tammy. West reappears when Donald Fisher (Norman Coburn) is facing murder charges and terminates his guardianship of Viv and has her placed in a children's home. However, Donald is exonerated and Viv returns.
11 May	Peter Braithwaite	Ron Blanchard	Peter is an insurance assessor who contacts Celia Stewart (Fiona Spence) about a claim following the recent fire of her store. He becomes suspicious when Celia asks for $500, 000, twice the store's value.
18–29 May	Kyoko Sakamoto	Yuka Mitani	Kyoko is an interpreter for Japanese clients of the Macklin family who visit Summer Bay on business.
2–8 June	Peter Bedford	Bevan Wilson	Peter is an investor in the Macklin development who is invited to dinner with the Fletcher family. He is disappointed when he learns Frank Morgan (Alex Papps) did not attend university and does little to impress Frank's wife Bobby (Nicolle Dickson) with his comments about the importance of a stable family home and education, prompting her to verbally attack him. Following this, Bedford decides not to sign with the Macklins but is eventually persuaded to sign the contract by Martin Dibble (Craig Thomson), who he takes a liking to.
2 June	Claire Bedford	Linda Anning	Claire is married to Macklin investor Peter Bedford (Bevan Wilson), who joins him after being invited to dinner with the Fletcher family.
8 June–18 July	Flynn	Mark McCann	Flynn is a labourer for the Macklin corporation. He and the other workers get tired of Martin Dibble's (Craig Thomson) attitude and call a strike. Roo Stewart (Justine Clarke) is able to negotiate and Flynn and the others call off the strike. Flynn later tries to assist Martin in the rescue of Marilyn Chambers (Emily Symons) who has climbed onto a high surface to get Andrew Foley's (Peter Bensley) attention.
13 June	Jay Everett	Andrew Doyle	Jay is a motivational guru who temporarily takes over as office manager at the Macklin development in Tom Fletcher's (Roger Oakley) absence. His positive energy rubs off on Martin Dibble (Craig Thomson) but fails to rouse Roo Stewart (Justine Clarke whose father Alf (Ray Meagher) is missing alongside Tom.
6 July–13 September	Nina Olivera	Raquel Suarstzman	Nina is a friend of Stacey Macklin (Sandie Lillingston). She assembles a music group called Image consisting of Lance Smart (Peter Vroom), Martin Dibble (Craig Thomson) and Marilyn Chambers (Emily Symons). Lance becomes more and more uncomfortable as the group's fame grows and feels Nina is controlling the lives of group. Lance sabotages a live performance at the Sands Resort and makes a fool of himself on a Saturday Morning television programme and Nina rips up the contract. However, Nina scores a job in Los Angeles for promoting Image and leaves to take it. She invites Stacey to join her several weeks later and she does.
11 July	Beulah	Robyn Gurney	Beulah is a homeless woman who helps Viv Newton (Mouche Phillips) while she is living rough on the streets.
19 July	Sgt. Col Baker	Simon Westaway	Baker questions Brian "Dodge" Forbes (Kelly Dingwall) over an accident involving a stolen car. Steven Matheson (Adam Willits) then assumes the blame.
21 July–1 August	John Newton	John Gregg	John is Viv Newton's (Mouche Phillips) father, who is a reverend. He arrives in Summer Bay after tracking Viv down, much to her horror. John puts on a sincere act in front of Viv's principal, Donald Fisher (Norman Coburn) and Andrew Foley (Peter Bensley) but once he gets Viv home, he locks her in a cupboard under the stairs. Steven Matheson (Adam Willits) and Bobby Simpson (Nicolle Dickson) pay a visit to the Newtons. They see through John's lies and rescue Viv but John refuses to let his younger daughter, Tammy (Katy Edwards) go with them. Bobby then locks John in a cupboard as taste of his own medicine and she, Steven, Viv and Tammy flee back to the Bay. After being freed, John arrives in Summer Bay to reclaim Tammy, who is reluctant to agree but Viv persuades her to go as a supervision order will be placed on John. After Tammy runs away the following year after more of John's abuse, The Department of Child Services get involved and question John, who relinquishes custody rather than face court.
27 July 1989 – 25 May 1990	Tammy Newton	Katy Edwards	Tammy is Viv Newton's (Mouche Phillips) younger sister. She is used by their father John (John Gregg) in order to guilt trip Viv into returning home. When Tammy and Viv flee to Summer Bay, John tracks them down and Viv refuses to return. After Howard West (Richard Rowe) arranges a supervision order, Tammy reluctantly agrees to return home while Viv remains with Donald. A year later, Tammy flees John and runs away to find Viv and stays in hiding for several days before reuniting with Viv. Helen Wakefield (Shayne Foote), a social worker locates Viv and Tammy's mother, Angela (Annie Byron) and brings her to meet her estranged daughters. Tammy is shocked and scared at first as John had told her and Viv that Angela had died. Angela explains that she left them when Tammy was a year old. Tammy then leaves with Viv and Angela to start a new life in Queensland.
9 August 1989 – 16 April 1990	Rex Wilson	Barry Donnelly	Rex is Matt Wilson's (Greg Benson) uncle who works on the local council. He gets Matt a job as beach inspector and closes down Andrew Foley's (Peter Bensley) advice centre in the store room of the diner. Rex suffers a heart attack several months later and resigns from the council.
9 August	Freddie Hudson	Mark Arbib	Freddie is a student who visits Andrew Foley (Peter Bensley) at his Youth advice centre at the Bayside diner.
18–31 August	Ross Keating	James Gleeson	Ross is Sally Keating's (Kate Ritchie) estranged uncle. He arrives just before Tom (Roger Oakley) and Pippa Fletcher's (Vanessa Downing) application to adopt Sally goes through and expresses an interest in obtaining custody of his niece. Sally is resistant on seeing Ross at first but when he and his wife Louise (Felicity Soper) invite her over to their spacious home, she changes her mind. Ross is happy when Sally tells him she wants to live with him and Louise, but she changes her mind after realising she is happy with the Fletchers. The Keatings then leave Summer Bay.
23–31 August	Louise Keating	Felicity Soper	Louise is Ross' (James Gleeson) wife and Sally's (Kate Ritchie) aunt. Louise and her husband grow closer to Sally as they are unable to have children themselves due to Louise having an operation for ovarian cancer that left her infertile. Louise is happy when Sally tells her and Ross she wants to live with them but Sally changes her mind and opts to stay with the Fletcher family.
29 August 1989, 23 March 1990	Len Baxter	Uncredited; Damian Cudmore	Len is the father of Vicki Baxter (Nana Coburn). He picks her up from the Surf Club dance but not before giving her date, Martin Dibble (Craig Thomson) a warning glare. When Vicki alleges her teacher Grant Mitchell (Craig McLachlan) has sexually molested her, Len is enraged and demands Grant be removed from the school. Grant is temporarily suspended but he is reinstated when Vicki reveals she lied.
29 August–10 November	Danny Farnsworth	Justin Connor	Danny is the son of Gordon Farnsworth, a man who Morag Bellingham (Cornelia Frances) sentenced to prison, resulting in Gordon committing suicide. Danny begins a revenge campaign against Morag by making threatening phone calls. He arrives in Summer Bay keeping his identity a secret and takes a job working for Morag as her assistant and moves in with her when she offers him a room. Morag's daughter, Bobby Simpson (Nicolle Dickson) takes an interest in Danny and they begin dating. Danny scares Morag by first planting a spider in a box of chocolates and by hanging a dummy, causing Morag to think there is a corpse in her living room. He is pleased when he realises nobody believes Morag, but comes unstuck when she discovers clippings from his father's trial. Danny holds Morag hostage and tries to kill her after she confronts him in a mock trial and Bobby and her father Donald Fisher (Norman Coburn) convince him to let her go with Donald pretending to be Danny's father during his psychotic episode. Bobby then helps him flee town and Danny asks her to leave with him but she turns him down.
30 August 1989 – 8 July 1996	Chris Hale	John Meillon Jr.	Hale is a police constable who first appears when Andrew Foley (Peter Bensley) and Stacey Macklin (Sandie Lillingston) trespass on private property. He later arrests Martin Dibble (Craig Thomson) for illegally selling stuffed Bunyips outside Summer Bay Primary. Following his promotion to sergeant, Hale is involved in various police matters over the years including the arrest of Shane Parrish (Dieter Brummer) for theft and Sally Fletcher (Kate Ritchie) running away. In December 1995, Hale accidentally knocks Shane off his bike in a hit and run, leaving him for dead. Shane dies of septicaemia several months later following the removal of his spleen and Hale's guilt compels him to help Shane's widow, Angel (Melissa George). He later threatens Jesse McGregor (Ben Unwin) who knows the truth but the guilt proves too much and Hale confesses and he is suspended.
11 September	Doctor Ellis	Marilyn Allen	A doctor at Northern Districts Hospital who arranges for Tom Fletcher (Roger Oakley) to be transferred to a hospital in the city following his heart attack.
11 September	Doctor Williamson	David Whitford	A city doctor who diagnoses Tom Fletcher (Roger Oakley) with an intracerebral haematoma.
18–21 September	Ian McTavish	Noel Trevarthen	McTavish is a Scottish explorer who arrives in Summer Bay to hunt down the legendary "Summer Bay Bunyip". He makes a play for Celia Stewart (Fiona Spence) who rebuffs him. When McTavish discovers there is no Bunyip and finds Martin Dibble (Craig Thomson) dressed in a costume, he leaves.
20 September	Samantha Walker	Fiona Shannon	A youth worker who informs Ailsa Stewart (Judy Nunn) of her niece Emma Jackson's (Dannii Minogue) desire to live with her. Ailsa is shocked as she is unaware that her estranged sister Bridget (Paula Duncan) has a daughter.
11–12 October	Millicent Staples	Julie Haseler	Millicent is a wealthy young woman who books a charter cruise with Adam Cameron (Mat Stevenson), who is attracted to her. He accepts her booking and transports Millicent and her two associates to a remote island. After spending the day together, Millicent tells Adam she will get rid of her associates so they can be alone but this is a trick as Millicent sails off on the yacht, leaving Adam marooned on the island.
11 October	Henry Whiting	Patrick Ward	Henry is the owner of a local hot dog stand who is approached by Lance Smart (Peter Vroom) and Martin Dibble (Craig Thomson) to sell the business but accepts an offer from Celia Stewart (Fiona Spence) instead.
25 October	Sylvia Wilson	Marie Armstrong	Sylvia is Rex Wilson’s (Barry Donnelly) wife and Matt's (Greg Benson) aunt. She is seen in the Stewart store when Martin Dibble (Craig Thomson) complains about the council shutting down his hot dog stand
26 October–15 November	Rory Heywood	Gregor Jordan	Rory arrives in summer Bay looking for the Fletcher family, who he believes to be friends of his father. Rory's true identity is exposed, but Tom's wife Pippa (Vanessa Downing) agrees to let him stay. His presence provides an irritation for Steven Matheson (Adam Willits) and Carly Morris (Sharyn Hodgson). Rory joins the surf club and helps Adam Cameron (Mat Stevenson) get back together with Carly. Rory, pleased with himself, goes for a surf but is eaten by a shark. Adam later avenges Rory by capturing the shark. Judy Nunn described the storyline involving Rory's shark attack as one of her favorites.
30 October–2 November	Mick	Bruce Samazan	Mick is a friend of Andrew Foley (Peter Bensley), who comes to stay with him and his girlfriend Stacey Macklin (Sandie Lillingston). Mick is a drug addict and when Stacey's engagement ring goes missing, she blames him but apologises when Mick explains he had the ring tightened. Mick then turns on Stacey and trashes the flat before leaving.
31 October	Chas	Richard Huggett	A friend of Lance Smart (Peter Vroom) and Martin Dibble (Craig Thomson). Chas is playing pool at The Corner Pocket when Mick (Bruce Samazan) asks to join in. Chas tells him it is one buck a game and lets him break, but Mick misses. Mick loses five games in a row, but tells Chas that he has got $15 left and wants to win his money back. Chas agrees, but only if he places all the money on the one game. Mick suddenly starts playing well and wins the game. He tells Chas that he must have gotten lucky and takes all the money. Chas finds Lance and Martin at the Diner and tells them about Mick hustling him at pool. Martin plans to play Mick for $500, but Chas says he would be an idiot to go up against Mick, as he is a pro.
17 November	Rosemary White	Zoe Bertram	Rosemary is Rory Heywood’s (Gregor Jordan) sister who arrives following his death. She reveals to the Fletcher family Rory's real name was Colin.
21 November 1989–22 January 1990	Zac Burgess	Mark Conroy	Zac is a shark hunter who arrives in the Bay after Rory Heywood (Gregor Jordan) is eaten by a shark. He demands $5000 upfront and $5000 for catching the shark much to the ire of the locals. Gordon Macklin (Ron Haddrick) pays $2000 toward the shark's capture but visits Zac at the caravan park and offers to double the money if the shark is kept alive. Zac learns that Gordon is having rubbish dumped on the closed beach and in the ocean in order to attract the shark and threatens to reveal he is behind the dumping. He then makes a move on Carly Morris (Sharyn Hodgson), much to her disgust then targets Pippa Fletcher (Vanessa Downing) who rejects his advances but Zac continues to the point where many people in town think they are having an affair, putting strain on Pippa's marriage to Tom (Roger Oakley). Steven Matheson (Adam Willits) arranges a plan to expose Zac by having Pippa feign interest in Zac's advances and records a conversation in which Zac admits everything. Tom and Zac fight and Zac leaves town.
12 December	Drew Howard	Ignatius Jones	Drew is Marilyn Chambers' (Emily Symons) producer on a game show called "Cheap shots". He tries to get Marilyn to make fools of Lance Smart (Peter Vroom) and Martin Dibble (Craig Thomson) on national television but Marilyn turns the tables and humiliates Drew instead by throwing tomato sauce on him.
