= Marele Day =

Australian author of mystery novels

Marele Day (born 4 May 1947) is an Australian author of mystery novels. She won the Shamus Award for her first Claudia Valentine novel and a Ned Kelly Award for non-fiction work How to Write Crime.

== Biography ==
Day was born in Sydney, and grew up in Pagewood, an industrial suburb. She attended Sydney Girls High School and Sydney Teachers' College and in 1973 obtained a degree from Sydney University. She has worked as a patent searcher and as a researcher and has also taught in elementary school during the 1980s.

Her Claudia Valentine series features a feminist Sydney-based private investigator but her breakthrough novel was Lambs of God which was a departure from the crime genre and features two nuns battling to save the island on which they live from developers; it became a bestseller. Lambs of God was adapted into a TV series of the same name in 2019, starring Ann Dowd and Essie Davis.

She lives on the New South Wales North Coast, where she is on the board of Byron Writers Festival and was the mentor of their residential mentorship program.

== Bibliography ==
=== Claudia Valentine series ===
- The Life and Crimes of Harry Lavender (1988) - Shamus Award winner
- The Case of the Chinese Boxes (1990)
- The Last Tango of Dolores Delgado (1993)
- The Disappearances of Madalena Grimaldi (1995)

=== Other novels ===
- Shirley's Song (1984)
- Lambs of God (1997)
- Mavis Levack, P.I. (2000)
- Mrs Cook: The Real and Imagined Life of the Captain's Wife (2003)
- The Sea Bed (2009)

=== Non-fiction ===
- Successful Promotion by Writers (1993)
- How to Write Crime (1996) – Ned Kelly Award winner
- Reckless (2023)
