= Dadah Is Death =

- Directed by: Jerry London
- Written by: Bill Kerby
- Starring: Julie Christie; Hugo Weaving; John Polson; Victor Banerjee; Sarah Jessica Parker; Mouche Phillips
- Music by: Fred Karlin
- Release date: 23 October 1988
- Running time: 180 minutes
- Country: Australia
- Language: English

Dadah Is Death is a 1988 Australian film based on the Barlow and Chambers execution in Malaysia in 1986.

It was a two-part miniseries, running two hours per part.

== Cast ==
- Julie Christie as Barbara Barlow
- Hugo Weaving as Geoffrey Chambers
- John Polson as Kevin Barlow
- Mouche Phillips as Michelle Barlow
- Sarah Jessica Parker as Rachel Goldman
- Kerry Armstrong as Shawn Burton
- Robin Ramsay as Wilf Barlow
- Victor Banerjee as Karpal Singh
- Shapoor Batliwalla as Nagendran
- Guy Stone as John
- Liddy Clark as Gilda Rickman
- Robert Davis as David West
- Narian Singh as prison superintendent
- Georgie Parker as Corine Johnstone
