= Episode 2351 =

- Home and Away episode
- Episode no.: Season 11; Episode 2351
- Directed by: Russell Webb
- Written by: Ray Harding
- Original air date: 30 March 1998
- Running time: 22 minutes

Guest appearances
- Adam Willits as Steven Matheson; Tempany Deckert as Selina Roberts; Ben Price as Geoffrey Burns; Michael Carter as Bill Burns; Lorraine Brown as Waitress; Richard Clohessy as George

Episode chronology
← Previous; Episode 2350	Next → Episode 2352

Episode 2351 of the Australian television soap opera Home and Away was broadcast on the Seven Network on 30 March 1998. It was written by Ray Harding and directed by series producer Russell Webb. The plot sees Irene Roberts (Lynne McGranger) and Marilyn Chambers (Emily Symons) visiting Selina Roberts (Tempany Deckert) in England, where she is recuperating from malaria, which she caught while travelling. Irene realises that something else is amiss with Selina and arranges a reunion between her and her former fiancé Steven Matheson (Adam Willits). The episode was filmed on-location in Ironbridge, Shropshire and marks the first time Home and Away was filmed overseas.

The episode was conceived after the serial's British television network wanted to give the show a boost in the UK. Producers and writers decided the focus should be on finishing the Steven and Selina romance story, which had not received a proper conclusion in the eyes of viewers due to Deckert's departure from the serial. Production began on 12 January 1998 and the shoot lasted for five days. Filming locations included East Midlands Airport, the living museum, and The Iron Bridge. Deckert reprised her role just for the episode, while Symons took time off rehearsals for a pantomime to film her scenes. Producers also introduced Bill Burns (Michael Carter) as a love interest for Irene, and his son Geoffrey Burns (Ben Price) as a friend of Selina.

Episode 2351 was well received by Denise Everton of the Illawarra Mercury, who said viewers would be "in for a bit of fun" with the episode. The Sydney Morning Herald's television critic Keith Austin gave it a thumbs up and commented that it was "proof that some things are so awful they're good." A writer for The Birmingham Post observed that Selina's presence in England was a "twist in the already twisted storyline" of her and Steven's relationship. A Newcastle Herald columnist included the episode in their "TV Highlights" feature, while Inside Soap called Home and Away the "Best Soap" for the fortnight.

== Plot ==
Marilyn Chambers calls Donald Fisher (Norman Coburn) from a pub in Ironbridge, England, forgetting that it is early morning in Australia. She begins telling him what has happened since she and Irene Roberts flew to the UK to look after Selina Roberts, who caught malaria while travelling in Africa. Irene tries to persuade Selina to get up and about, while she goes into town. Geoffrey Burns, an Englishman who met Selina in Africa, comes by to ask her to continue their holidays together. While in town, Irene admits to Marilyn that her money is running out and she needs to get back home soon. Geoffrey's father Bill joins them and Irene tells him that Selina is really down. Irene also explains that she cannot stay for much longer, which disappoints Bill, as they have enjoyed each other's company. Irene tells Bill that she has organised something that will help Selina's mood and they go to the airport to meet Steven Matheson, Selina's former fiancé. Steven thanks Irene for calling him and she apologises for standing in his and Selina's way when they wanted to marry. Selina is surprised, but happy to see Steven. He tells her he will explain what he is doing in Ironbridge while they look around the living museum.

At a nearby pub, Irene asks Bill why he never remarried and he says that he could not face the idea of loving someone again and having them taken away. He then adds that he was not prepared to make a commitment to someone before now. In the town, Marilyn gets off a bus and sees Steven across the street, but believes she is mistaken. Back at the cottage, Marilyn tells Irene about seeing Steven and Irene confirms that it was him. Irene then tells Marilyn that she and Bill are off to Birmingham and have booked a hotel room for the night. At the living museum, Steven admits that he still loves Selina and he wants to go travelling with her. The pair meet Geoffrey, who is volunteering at the museum, and he realises that Selina does not return his affection. On the iron bridge, Steven takes out a ring and reminds Selina that she told him he might need it one day. Selina responds by kissing him and accepts his proposal. Marilyn finishes telling Donald the story, but she receives no response because he is asleep.

== Production ==
=== Conception and development ===
Episode 2351 marks the first time Home and Away was filmed overseas. Initial details about the episode were announced in December 1997. Steven Murphy of Inside Soap reported that four cast members would be coming to Britain for a week in January 1998 to film scenes for an episode that would air in March. Tempany Deckert agreed to reprise her role as Selina Roberts especially for the episode, which also features Adam Willits as Steven Matheson, and show regulars Emily Symons and Lynne McGranger as Marilyn Chambers and Irene Roberts respectively. Producer and director Russell Webb told Murphy that the episode was conceived after British television network ITV wanted to do something to give the show a boost in the UK. The producers and writers began considering the Steven and Selina romance arc, which had not received a proper conclusion in the eyes of many viewers, and thought that they could finish the storyline in the UK. Deckert admitted that producers had been disappointed they could not finish the Steven and Selina story because of her decision to leave the serial at the end of her contract. She explained that the producer had asked her to stay, as they still had storylines for her character, but she felt that after three years her time was up. On-screen, her character left Australia to go travelling overseas, and the episode takes places a few months after her departure. Willits pointed out that the decision to film in the UK tied in with Selina's exit storyline. He also noted that the show's UK fan-base was still strong and he called the episode "a nice 'thank you'" to the British fans. Willits own commitments with Home and Away ended at the conclusion of the shoot.

Deckert was already in the UK when the cast and crew arrived, and she told Murphy that filming would finish the day before she was due to fly to New York for a drama course. Symons was also in the UK ahead of her appearance in the Goldilocks and the Three Bears pantomime and she took time off rehearsals to film her scenes. Producers introduced Michael Carter as Bill Burns, a love interest for Irene., while Ben Price plays his son Geoffrey Burns, who develops an attraction to Selina. The plot of the episode centres on Selina, who has contracted malaria while travelling in Africa, and is recovering in England. Irene and Marilyn fly over to help look after her, while Selina's former fiancé Steven later joins them and reconciles with Selina. While discussing the plot, McGranger joked that her character "must have a bottomless pit of money". She said that Irene receives this call telling her that Selina has contracted malaria and is in England, leading her to drop everything and fly halfway across the world. Murphy observed that Selina is thrilled to see Irene and Marilyn again, but she is "a little taken aback" when Steven turns up. Deckert explained: "She's a bit shocked to see him. She still loves him, but she's not prepared to give up travelling the world – so the pair of them have to try and find a solution." Of Irene's love interest Bill, who helps nurse Selina back to health, McGranger told Murphy that it looks like her character has finally found herself the right man and she is "swept away by him". However, she pointed out that it is impossible for them to have a proper relationship because he lives in the UK and she lives in Australia.

=== Filming ===
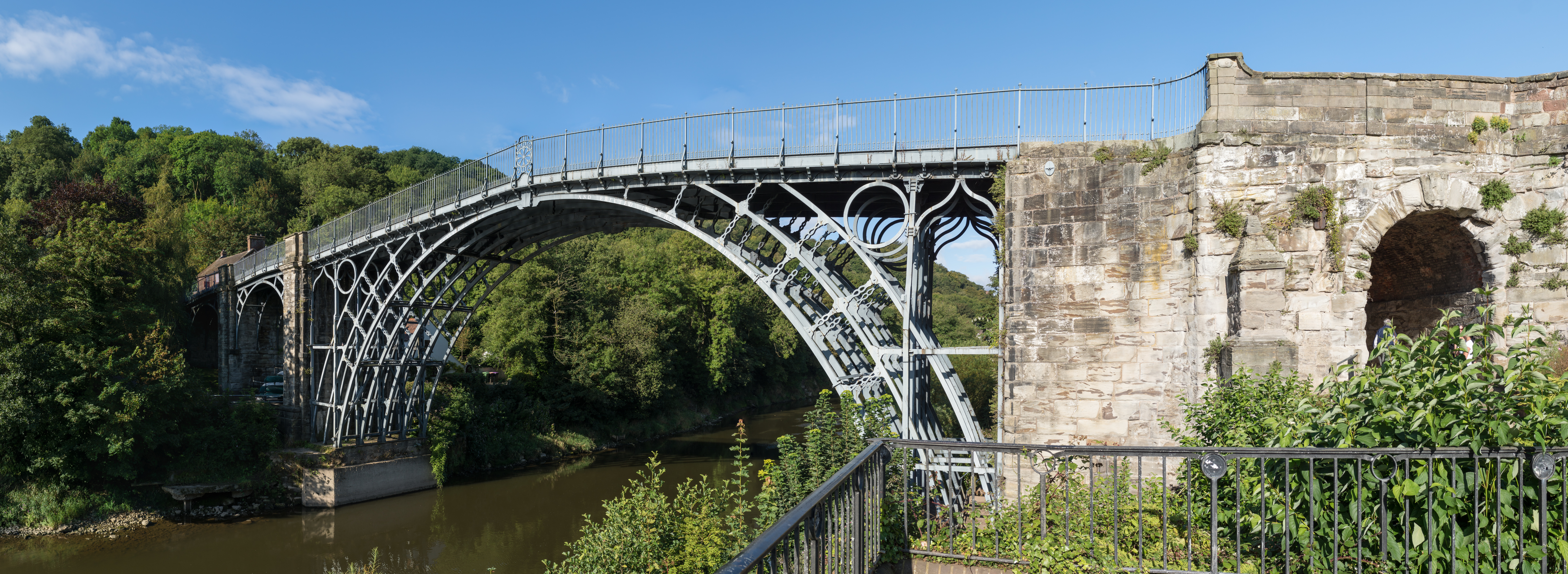
The Iron Bridge is the setting for Steven and Selina's reconciliation and engagement.

The episode was filmed over five days in Ironbridge, Shropshire in the United Kingdom. The village's traditional buildings and "picturesque" views were ideal for the production team's needs. Deckert joked that her initial reaction to hearing about the location of the shoot was what the cast would wear, as they spent all their time in Summer Bay and had no winter clothes. However, Willits said he was used to "harsh" weather, having previously travelled around Scotland and Ireland. A spokesperson for ITV commented that the shoot had "posed problems" for the serial's wardrobe department, who had to search Australia for fake fur coats. The cast had to wear blankets and carry hot water bottles while on breaks from filming. During production, flood alerts were put in place in case the River Severn broke its banks, something that had occurred the previous week.

Production on the episode began on 12 January 1998 on location at the Ironbridge Gorge Museum. The scenes depicting Irene and Bill meeting Steven's plane from Paris were filmed at East Midlands Airport. Deckert and Willits filmed next to a working blast furnace during a shoot at the living museum, while the town's cast iron bridge is the setting for their character's reconciliation. Deckert said the location was "really lovely" despite the rain, and she likened the shoot to being at a holiday camp. She also found filming to be easier than it usually was. However, Kate Rider of the Manchester Evening News reported that "braving the elements" was harder for the cast during the shoot because of the show's "stop-start" schedule. Each day of filming attracted large crowds of fans. Symons commented that Ironbridge was what most Australians thought Britain was like at the time. She admitted that the cast were "quite surprised" by all attention from the fans who came to watch filming and joked that they felt "a bit like the Spice Girls."

== Reception ==
Critic Keith Austin from The Sydney Morning Herald gave Episode 2351 a thumbs up in his column, writing that the "much-touted UK episode, is proof that some things are so awful they're good." Austin thought that the episode was "a curious melange of cast members strolling inanely though beautiful location shots and hyper-realistic sets." He singled out Marilyn for complaining about the cold and then going out with no stockings and "a skirt so short she's in danger of losing her bum to frostbite." Jacqueline McArthur of The Sun-Herald said the episode was "action-packed". She dubbed Geoffrey "a spunk" and noted how he had "taken a shine" to Selina. McArthur added that it was "an emotional few days for the stars of Home and Away". The Illawarra Mercury's Denise Everton said that it was inevitable that an Australian soap would film in England due to their popularity, but thought it was "strange" that it had taken so long. She believed fans of Home and Away would be "in for a bit of fun" with the episode. Everton also joked that she got jetlag just from watching Irene and Marilyn travel to England, while Selina had just been to Africa.

A Newcastle Herald columnist included the episode in their "TV Highlights" feature for the week. The episode also led Inside Soap to call Home and Away the "Best Soap" for the fortnight of 18 April – 1 May 1998. A Birmingham Post writer thought that Selina ending up in England with malaria was a "twist in the already twisted storyline" of her relationship with Steven. They observed that "the chill of the English winter does nothing to cool down the passions of the Aussies. And, in typical soap style, love blossoms amid the falling leaves and frosts and Selina falls into Steven's arms." The Daily Mirror's TV guide, edited by Tony Pratt and Paul Sacre, branded Episode 2351 a "special episode". They dubbed Irene and Marilyn "two old chums", and commented that Irene "finds the setting of Ironbridge's museums and gorges so romantic that she falls in love with a local widower".
