= Jesse Blackadder =

Australian novelist, screenwriter, and journalist (1964–2020)

- Born: June 1964; Sydney, New South Wales, Australia
- Died: 10 June 2020 (aged 55–56); Byron Bay, New South Wales, Australia
- Education: Bachelor of Arts (Communication), University of Technology Sydney; Master of Applied Science (Social Ecology), Western Sydney University; Doctor of Creative Arts, Western Sydney University
- Occupations: Novelist, screenwriter, journalist
- Years active: 2000s–2020
- Known for: Historical fiction; Australian Antarctic Arts Fellowships
- Notable work: After the Party (2005); The Raven's Heart (2011); Chasing the Light (2013); Sixty Seconds (2017)
- Partner: Andi Davey
- Awards: Benjamin Franklin House Literary Prize; Golden Crown Literary Society Award; Guy Morrison Prize for Literary Journalism

Jesse Blackadder (June 1964 – 10 June 2020) was an Australian novelist, screenwriter and journalist. She authored short stories and novels for children and adults. The Raven's Heart: A Story of a Quest, a Castle and Mary Queen of Scots (2011) won the Benjamin Franklin House annual literary prize and Golden Crown Literary Society awards for 2013. Blackadder was the second person and first woman to have been awarded two Australian Antarctic Arts Fellowships, in 2011 and 2018, about which she wrote a number of essays.

== Personal life ==
Blackadder grew up on Sydney's north shore. She completed a Bachelor of Arts in Communication at the University of Technology in Sydney and a Master of Applied Science in Social Ecology and a Doctor of Creative Arts from Western Sydney University. When she was 12, her two-year-old sister Lucy drowned, a tragic incident about which Blackadder said, "I feel like it formed the rest of my life." She lived in Byron Bay in New South Wales with her partner Andi Davey for many years, where she died on 10 June 2020 from pancreatic cancer.

== Career ==
Blackadder's first novel, After the Party (2005), appeared on the Australian Book Review's 2010 list of favourite Australian novels of the 21st century.

Her second, novel, The Raven's Heart: A Story of a Quest, a Castle and Mary Queen of Scots (2011), is a work of historical fiction written partly because she decided to investigate the origins of the Blackadder surname, having been repeatedly asked if she was related to Rowan Atkinson (who created and starred in the BBC comedy series Blackadder). The Raven's Heart won the Benjamin Franklin House annual literary prize and Golden Crown Literary Society awards for 2013, and an Independent Publisher Book Awards Historical Fiction bronze medal.

In 2011, Blackadder received an Australian Antarctic Arts Fellowship to visit Davis Station (on Ingrid Christensen Land in Antarctica) for six weeks. Using her research there, she explored the issue of using historical figures in fiction to obtain her Doctorate in Creative Arts, awarded in 2014, from Western Sydney University. From this came her historical novel, Chasing the Light (2013), about Ingrid Christensen, the first woman to see Antarctica, and the women who accompanied her. The trip also resulted in a children's book called Stay: The Last Dog in Antarctica (2013), featuring Stay, a fibreglass guide dog that kept Blackadder company during one her field trips.

In 2016 Blackadder was instrumental in founding StoryBoard, a mobile writing program for children under the banner of the Byron Bay Writers Festival. At the time of her death in 2020, the StoryBoard bus had received about 27,000 visitors.

Having previously shelved a manuscript about her childhood experiences when her two-year-old sister drowned in her family's backyard swimming pool, she eventually wrote the novel Sixty Seconds (2017) to explore the grief and guilt felt by a family in similar circumstances, as well as the issue of personal responsibility and the possible criminal repercussions of such accidents. The book was published in the United States in 2019 under the title In the Blink of an Eye.

In 2018, Blackadder again was a successful recipient of an Australian Antarctic Arts Fellowship, this time won jointly with screenwriter Jane Allen. The two writers visited Mawson Station from November 2018 to February 2019, during which time they prepared a draft of an Antarctic adventure novel for young readers and the structure for the first season of a television series about life on an Antarctic research station. These two works were still in development at the time of Blackadder's death.

As a freelance journalist, Blackadder published many articles, including "The first woman and the last dog in Antarctica", which won the 2012 Guy Morrison Prize for Literary Journalism from the Australasian Association of Writing Programs.

She also wrote extensively about agriculture and sustainability, deliberative democracy, and the environment. She was actively involved in Landcare Australia, an environmental not-for-profit organisation.

Frankie, co-written with Laura Bloom, was shortlisted for the 2019 Children's Peace Literature Award.

== Books ==
=== Adult fiction ===
- After the Party (2005)
- The Raven's Heart: A Story of a Quest, a Castle and Mary Queen of Scots (2011)
- Chasing the Light (2013)
- Sixty Seconds (2017) – Published as In the Blink of an Eye (2019) in the USA

=== Children's fiction ===
- Dexter: The Courageous Koala (2015)
- Paruku: The Desert Brumby (2014)
- Stay: The Last Dog in Antarctica (2013)
- Frankie (Dream Riders #1) (2019) – written with Laura Bloom
- Storm (Dream Riders #2) (2019) – written with Laura Bloom
