= Mouche Phillips =

Australian actress

- Born: 1973 (age 52–53); Sydney, New South Wales, Australia
- Education: St Catherine's School; Central School of Speech and Drama
- Occupations: Actress; theatrical producer
- Years active: 1985–present
- Employer(s): Ripe Productions; Byron Theatre
- Known for: Home and Away
- Spouse: Sy Milman (m. 2002; div. 2010)
- Children: 3

Mouche Phillips (born 1973) is an Australian actress and theatre producer, best known for her television roles as Aviva "Viv" Newton in Home and Away (1989–90) and Eva Sykes in police procedural series Water Rats (2000–01).

== Early life ==
Phillips was born in Sydney, and attended Woollahra Public School with several other future actors, including Home and away co-star Justine Clarke and singer Deni Hines, and then St Catherine's School, Waverley from 1984 to 1989. Her father, Tony Lunes was a yacht skipper working in Cornwall, United Kingdom.

== Career ==
Phillips began her career in 1985 by playing the character of Jackie Wilson in the children's television show Butterfly Island. She then starred as "Beatie Bow" in the 1986 feature film Playing Beatie Bow when she was twelve years old. She later appeared in many Seven Network serials, including A Country Practice and Rafferty's Rules.

On 5 July 1989, she premiered as a cast member of the popular series Home and Away, on which she played Aviva "Viv" Newton. She left the series on 25 May 1990. Phillips was sharing a house with Justine Clarke and began auditioning the week after Clarke had left the serial. Phillips told a writer from Look-in that she liked to be kept busy on set. She explained that "people" were often left trying to find her because she was not where she should have been. Phillips told Graeme Kay from BIG! that the role had taken up too much of her time and she preferred having a free schedule.

She later starred in a number of the Kennedy Miller Productions in the 1980s. She was cast in the ABC series G.P. before, at the age of 17, moving to London, England. Aged 19, she was accepted into the Central School of Speech and Drama.

After returning to Sydney in the mid-1990s, Phillips began producing pub theatre with a group of friends, Jeremy Cumpston, Simon Lyndon and Joel Edgerton, later to be known as the Tamarama Rock Surfers theatre group.

She later starred in PorkChop Productions' first show, a production of Rosencrantz and Guildenstern Are Dead. That led to her being appointed PorkChop's full-time producer, which led her to develop material to stage at the Sydney Opera House. Phillips produced Last Cab to Darwin for PorkChop Productions which was staged at the Opera House in Sydney and at the Black Swan State Theatre Company in Perth.

In 2000, Phillips appeared as a guest in the police series Water Rats where she played Eva Minton-Sykes, wife of Gavin Sykes until 2001. In 2009 she appeared in the third season of the series H_{2}O: Just Add Water where she played Mrs. Taylor, a science teacher, until 2010. She joined the cast of Secrets & Lies where she played Vanessa Turner, the wife of the doctor Timothy Turner on 3 March 2014.

== Personal life ==
Phillips married Sy Milman on 21 September 2002. The couple had three children and they divorced in 2010. She is currently the owner and creative director of Ripe Productions and took the position of creative producer for Byron Theatre in 2010. She also works as the Sponsorship Manager for the Byron Bay Writers Festival and as the curator of the Byron Bay Soul Street New Year's Eve Event. She also works as the Sponsorship Manager for the Byron Bay Writers Festival She directs a theater program for the Byron Theatre, also has taught several children focused on functions of camera, improvisation and has assisted as a children's casting director and acting teacher.

== Memberships and associations ==
- Ripe Productions – Owner (June 2001 – Present)
- Byron Theatre – Creative Producer (2010–present)
- Byron Bay Writers Festival – Partnership Manager
- Byron Bay Soul Street New Year's Eve Event – Curator

== Filmography ==
=== Film ===
Year	Title	Role	Director
1986	Playing Beatie Bow	Beatie Bow	Donald Crombie
1993	Butterfly Island	Jackie Wilson	Frank Arnold
1997	Reprisal	Lavinia	Robert Marchand
1998	Never Tell Me Never	Meredith	David Elfick

=== Television ===
Year	Title	Role	Notes
1985	Butterfly Island	Jackie Wilson	TV series
1987	The Haunted School	Magpie	Miniseries
1988	Dadah Is Death	Michelle Barlow	Miniseries
1988	The Dirtwater Dynasty	Mary Eastwick	Miniseries
1988	Princess Kate	Sarah	Television film
1989	G.P.	Sarah	Television film
1989–1990	Home and Away	Viv Newton	TV series; 130 episodes
1991	Golden Fiddles	Daphne Craig	Miniseries
1991	Chances	Nicki Taylor	Miniseries
1996	Pacific Drive	PJ	TV series
1996	Sweat	Robyn Barry	TV series; episode: 1.5
2000–2001	Water Rats	Eva Sykes	TV series; 8 episodes
2008–2009	East of Everything	Sandy	TV series; 11 episodes
2009–2010	H_{2}O: Just Add Water	Ms. Taylor	TV series; 5 episodes
2011	Rescue Special Ops	Leonie Carr	TV series; episode: "The Game"
2013	The Gods of Wheat Street	Petra Hamilton	TV series; 6 episodes
2014	Secrets & Lies	Vanessa Turner	TV series; 4 episodes
2021	Eden	Lelia	1 episode
2021	Total Control	Talkback Radio Host	1 episode

=== Producer ===
Year	Title	Notes
2003	Last Cab to Darwin	Producer
TBA	Delectable Shelter	Producer
TBA	Ruby’s Last Dollar	Producer
TBA	The Harbinger	Touring Producer
TBA	Stow and The Dragon	Producer

=== Theatre ===
Year	Title	Role	Director	Theatre	Notes
1995	Rosencrantz and Guildenstern Are Dead	–	Jeremy Sims	Belvoir Street Theatre	Jonathan Hardy, Andrea Moor, Sean O'Shea and Christopher Stollery
1996	Lockie Leonard, Human Torpedo	–	Alan Becher	National Theatre	Leon Ewing, Greg McNeill, Scott McRae, Mattie Porges & James Sollis

== Awards and nominations ==
Year	Category	Award
–	Best Acting in Radio	Silver Stylus Award
