= Byron Writers Festival =

Annual literary festival in Australia

The Byron Writers Festival, formerly known as Byron Bay Writers Festival, is an Australian literary festival taking place annually in Byron Bay, New South Wales.

== History ==
The Byron Bay Writers Festival commenced in 1997. It was founded by Peter Barclay and a group of volunteers who in part drew some of their inspiration from the Adelaide Writers' Week. The festival was organised through the Northern Rivers Writers' Centre, which was incorporated in 1995.

In 2005 the festival had an audience of between 7,000 and 8,000, an increase of 25 per cent over the previous year. Notable participants included Midnight Oil drummer and songwriter Rob Hirst, writers Delia Falconer and Kate Grenville, and novelist Robert Drewe who lives in the area. The tenth festival was held in 2006, and attracted an audience of 9,000 across 90 sessions. Presenters included sports journalist Gideon Haigh, actor and writer William McInnes, and Robert Drewe.

In 2010 the festival included presentations by over 100 participants. In 2015, individual visitors to the three-day event reached 3000 a day and a total of 65,000 at sessions, compared with 109,000 at Sydney Writers' Festival. In 2016, the centre and the festival were amalgamated under one banner, which was rebranded Byron Writers Festival.

2019 was a record year, with the highest box-office sales in its 23-year history and 140 local and international guests across 121 on-site events, 17 off-site events, 15 workshops, a schools program for primary- and secondary-school students, and a road trip to regional towns. The festival did not run in 2020 or 2021, due to the COVID-19 pandemic.

In 2023, it was held in the Bangalow Showgrounds for the first time.

== Description ==
The festival is held on the first weekend of August each year. It has included interviews with a number of notable writers, including Cheryl Strayed, Bret Easton Ellis, Matthew Reilly, and Kathy Lette.

As of 2016 the festival has four flagship programs: the annual festival, a free creative writing program for children called StoryBoard, professional development services for members, and the annual residential mentorship opportunity.

=== Residential Mentorship ===
The Residential Mentorship was established in 2001 for emerging writers in the region, and has led to significant amounts of publication. Notable alumni include Jesse Blackadder, Jarrah Dundler, Jessie Cole, Russell Eldridge, Mirandi Riwoe, Emma Ashmere, Helen Burns, Bronwyn Birdsall and Lisa Walker. Local author Marele Day was the mentor from 2001 to 2021 and in 2022, former participant Sarah Armstrong became the new mentor.

=== Rhoda Roberts Oration ===
The inaugural Rhoda Roberts Oration was held at the August 2026 event, established in honour of the Bundjalung theatre and arts director, arts executive, television presenter, and actress Rhoda Roberts, who had died earlier in the year. The inaugural address was delivered by playwright and artistic director Wesley Enoch.

== Governance ==
Edwina Johnson was the festival's longest-standing director, from 2014 to 2022. She was praised in the The Sydney Morning Herald for growing the festival into an international event, including guests such as Jeanette Winterson and Geoff Dyer.

In 2022, after a hiatus caused by the COVID-19 pandemic, it returned under new director Zoe Pollock.
