= Steven Matheson =

Fictional character

- Home and Away character
- Portrayed by: Adam Willits
- Duration: 1988–1991, 1995–1998, 2000, 2002–2003, 2008
- First appearance: 17 January 1988
- Last appearance: 3 April 2008
- Introduced by: Alan Bateman (1988); John Holmes (1995, 2000); Julie McGauran (2002, 2003); Cameron Welsh (2008)
- Book appearances: The Steven Matheson Story; Summer Bay Blues; Scandal at Summer Bay
In-universe information
- Occupation: Student at Summer Bay High (1988–1990); Teacher at Summer Bay High (1995–1996); Computer Technician (1997–)
- Father: Brett Matheson
- Mother: Martha Matheson
- Wife: Lyn
- Uncles: Philip Matheson

Steven Matheson is a fictional character from the Australian Channel Seven soap opera Home and Away, played by Adam Willits. Steven was created by Alan Bateman as one of the serial's original characters and he first appeared in the pilot episode. Willits received the role after being one of over three hundred actors to audition for the roles of the serial's foster children. He was a regular cast member from 1988 to 1991 and again between 1995 and 1996. He has continued to make guest appearances in from 1997 until 2008.

Steven is characterised in his early years by his quiet and studious persona, he later becomes problematic as he grows older. His main storylines have focused on his early tragedies in which his family die, bullying, his first kiss with Narelle Smart (Amanda Newman-Phillips) and his on/off relationship with Selina Roberts (Tempany Deckert). Critics of the serial have favoured his appearance and have subsequently branded him a "heart-throb" because of his good looks. Others have commented that he grew up quickly on-screen and eventually become a problematic character.

== Casting ==
In 1987 over three hundred actors auditioned for the roles of the Fletcher's foster children. Eventually sixteen-year-old Adam Willits was offered the part of Steven. Prior to the role Willits had gained a fair amount of experience as a child actor. In 1989 Willits confirmed in the "Home and Away Annual" that he was happy to stay with the serial and watch Steven develop. In 1990, Willits decided to leave the serial to pursue other projects. David Brown from TV Week reported that Willits would film his final scenes in October 1990. Steven remained on-screen until the following year.

In March 1995, David Brown of TV Week reported that Willits has reprised the role. He began filming his six-month stint in June. He returned in 1996, and for an additional stint in 1997. In 1998 Willits filmed a conclusion to Steven's storyline on location in the UK. In 2002 Willits returned alongside numerous ex-cast members to film a special storyline for the "150th anniversary" of Summer Bay.

== Development ==
In the 1989 edition of the "Home and Away Annual", Steven is described in his years as being "quiet and studious, but with an inventive mind. When he came to the Fletchers, he was disturbed, and was having terrible nightmares about his parents' death." They also add "Steven is liable to become a wonderfully caring and informed person, or a pompous brat." In the "Home and Away Annual" he is described as having the life of any average teenager. Willits described Steven stating: "A nice guy, not very trendy though". Willits has also stated it's a challenge to play Steven because he is so different from him, so much so he did not relate to him, he also branded Steven as "not very outgoing". After two years of playing the role, Willits said that Steven "started off as a bit of a bookworm but as he has grown up he has found distractions more engaging than academia!" Willits added that Steven is "not the trendiest guy in the world, but thankfully as time passes he gets a bit more wayward." In another interview he states: "I love to get out of his character when shooting is finished, and to ruffle up my hair which is all brushed like Steven's." While interviewed by Clive Hopwood for the book Home and Away Special, Willits said that Steven's development was slow because he remained "a bit of a dork". He added that Steven was destined for "exciting things".

Steven's first kiss is with fellow character Narelle Smart (Amanda Newman-Phillips), who is three years older than he is (being seventeen at the time). Of this Willits states: "I'd go for an older woman, if Steven can, I certainly can." Discussing the scenes and Steven's reasons, Willits states: "In the script he had this plan to get Narelle to kiss me, because he has done a survey and he's a pretty hot kisser. It wasn't as though they were in love though." He also named it as one of Steven's greatest moments during the early years. Newman-Phillips describes the filming of the storyline stating: "Narelle seduces Steven and when it came to the kissing scene we were both very nervous. It was the first for both of us and we just couldn't get the scene right, so we did some extra rehearsing. The kiss only lasted a minute, but in the end it took us a couple of hours to get it perfect for the cameras." Whilst interviewed by TV Week, Willits stated: "When you consider rehearsals and retakes, we kissed a hell of a lot. It was great. She gave me all the pointers". The serial later cast Kate Raison to play artist Jennifer Atkinson, a new love interest for Steven. In the Home and Away Annual Authorised Edition, Kesta Desmond said that their romance would develop into a "torrid affair" and that it could "all end in tears".

In another storyline school secretary Joanne Brennan (Kimberley Joseph) starts up an obsessive campaign to seduce Steven. Steven does not show any interest in return. Joseph said "She goes out of her way to wreck any other romance he has - and ends up stalking him." Joanne continues her "bitchy" campaign until she departs. Steven had a drawn out relationship with his student Selina Roberts (Tempany Deckert), their relationship takes many "twists" along the way. Selina leaves Steven on their wedding day. Deckert said it was a "typical soap wedding" with many mishappenings. The conclusion to their storyline before Steven's final departure of the nineties, was filmed in Ironbridge, Shropshire. It was the first ever episode to be filmed abroad for the serial.

When Steven returned to the show in 2002, it was revealed that he had been living in Hong Kong with Selina and taken a job as an IT consultant.

== Storylines ==
=== Backstory ===
Steven was born in Hornsby, New South Wales and is the only son of Brett and Martha Matheson. One night, while Steven was staying over at his friend, Danny's house, he heard sirens belonging to fire engines and discovered that the family home was on fire and Brett and Martha were trapped. The Mathesons had put bars on the windows previously so escape was impossible. Brett and Martha died in the blaze and Steven, with no available extended family, was placed into a temporary care home until Tom (Roger Oakley) and Pippa Fletcher (Vanessa Downing) fostered him.

=== 1988–91 ===
Steven first appears on screen in the pilot when he and his foster family sit down to celebrate Tom's 40th birthday. Later, when Tom announces to the family that he is being retrenched, Steven offers to live elsewhere as he feels the Fletchers will be unable to afford looking after him. The family eventually relocate from the city to country town Summer Bay. Early into the Fletchers' arrival Steven manages to win the approval of foster brother Frank Morgan (Alex Papps), who has been suspicious of him since his arrival. Steven also manages to befriend local tomboy Bobby Simpson (Nicolle Dickson), who later joins the family. Steven asks Frank for advice, he believes no one sees him as a grown up and just as a boy, he starts shaving and trying new things to look older. Steven starts feeling an attraction for Narelle, who is three years older than he is, they later kiss, Steven sees it as a big moment as it's the first time he's kissed a girl. Steven gets his first taste of a real romance when classmate, Sandra Barlow (Catherine McColl-Jones) shows an interest him. Unfortunately, Sandra's abusive father, Sam Barlow (Jeff Truman) takes an immediate dislike to Steven and warns him off. Steven and Sandra continue seeing each other secretly until Sam's behaviour culminates in him accidentally shooting his wife and Sandra's mother, Kerry dead. Sandra later leaves the area to stay with a foster family in the city. Steven later has several run-ins with P.E. teacher Jeff Samuels (Alex Petersons) whose training regimes do not sit well with Steven, the Fletchers or many other people in Summer Bay. Steven is overjoyed when his uncle Philip Matheson (John Morris), his only living relative arrives in Summer Bay. Philip is later killed in an arson attack on the general store at the hands of Brian "Dodge" Forbes (Kelly Dingwall), who has a grudge against the owner Celia Stewart (Fiona Spence). Steven is devastated and begins having nightmares and flashbacks to his parents' deaths in the fire.

Dodge becomes Tom and Pippa's latest foster child, he strikes up a friendship with Steven and winds him up on multiple occasions about not being macho. Dodge enjoys using Steven to do his essays and he later fools Steven into turning on his former geeky friends over a money dispute. Dodge had in fact, being bullying one of them, when they all attack him, Steven decides to attempt to attack the lads. They are shocked and tell him he's a better person than that. Dodge has a grudge against Roo Stewart's (Justine Clarke) boyfriend Simon Yates (Christopher Saunders), who he tries to pin the blame on over the arson attack. He manipulates Steven into attacking him on the beach and vowing revenge. Dodge steals a car and crashes it, Steven takes the blame to protect him, but Dodge reveals it was him and vows to change. Just as everyone trusts him again, he drunkenly confesses to setting the fire that killed Phillip. Enraged, Steven tries to attack him before Dodge is charged with murder. Steven later leaves to go to university.

=== 1995–2008 ===
Four year later, Steven returns and gets a job at Summer Bay High as a teacher, much to Donald Fisher's (Norman Coburn) surprise. Everyone is delighted to have him back and he settles back into life with family around. When Marilyn Chambers (Emily Symons) returns they become better friends and eventually start a relationship, it proves short lived however and they decide it's best to be friends again. Later his student, Selina falls in love with Steven, he tells her they cannot be together because of his job and age difference. However Steven later gives in to his feelings and starts an affair with her, but they later decide to end things. Selina's stalker Jeremy Riggs (David Stanley) finds out about her and Steven so tries to black mail them, but he tries to hang himself in the school toilets and Irene Roberts (Lynne McGranger) finds out the truth, she files a complaint which sees Steven sacked from his job and everyone in town is shocked to learn about their affair.

Dodge is released from prison and returns to Summer Bay, wanting revenge on Steven. Dodge hides jelly beans in Steven's house and black mails him by stating he will go to the police and tell them he has illegal drugs in his property. Scared Steven becomes extremely affected by his presence, but is happy to find out they're not drugs. Steven and Kelly Watson (Katrina Hobbs) have an affair behind Travis Nash's (Nic Testoni) back, although Kelly later decides it isn't a good idea and ends things. Kelly helps him set Dodge up for theft. Whilst out on a cruise, Dodge jumps overboard and is presumed dead. The police start a murder investigation with Steven as their prime suspect. Dodge later turns up alive and kidnaps Kelly, when Steven tracks them down they start fighting on the edge of a cliff. In the end they both roll over the edge of the cliff, Steven survives but Dodge remained unfound. After alienating himself from most of the Bay's residents and annoying Pippa when he shows no interest in his foster sister Sally Fletcher's (Kate Ritchie) abduction, he decides to rethink his place in the town. Sally is found and goes to hospital and waits for Steven. Steven leaves Pippa a note and flees the town, without saying goodbye to his closest family member Sally.

One year later he returns feeling in a better place. He starts to fall for Selina again, delighted they resume their relationship. This time more people approve and they decide to get married. On their wedding day however, Selina seemingly jilts Steven. She is actually being held hostage by cult leader Saul Bennett (David Ritchie), later she escapes and Steven is relieved to have her back. She shocks him by telling him she no longer wants to marry him after her ordeal. He leaves the bay once more. After another year passes Marilyn and Irene decide to head overseas to, Ironbridge when Selina is severely ill, they arrange for Steven to come and look after her. When he arrives he proposes to Selina, who gladly accepts. They leave the bay together this time. Steven returns two years later for Sally's wedding to Kieran Fletcher (Spencer McLaren), he reveals that he and Selina still haven't got married. After Kieran's infidelity is discovered, Steven beats him up on the beach. Steven returns again for Summer Bay's 150th anniversary celebrations and visits again the following year when his other foster sister Sophie Simpson (Rebekah Elmaloglou) agrees to be a surrogate for Sally. During this time, Steven reveals that he and Selina have broken up and he has married someone named Lyn. He returns for the last time when Sally decides to leave Summer Bay, after Ric Dalby (Mark Furze) gets in touch with him. Steven reveals he and Selina have got back together. Pippa and Carly also join him. He tells Sally how much she deserves her big send off and they reminisce about the old days when they first moved into the house on the caravan park twenty years earlier. After Sally leaves, Steven returns home.

== Reception ==
In his book, Super Aussie Soaps, Andrew Mercado describes the moment Steven decides to marry Selina as a scandal because she was his student. In her book "Soapbox", Hilary Kingsley brands Steven the quietest foster child of Pippa and Tom. In the book "Home and Away: behind the scenes", James Oram comments on Steven's young heart-throb status, stating: "Those who concern themselves with such matters as heart-throbs suggest he is well on his way to joining that select circle. He could be the youngest heart-throb in history, or at least since Romeo caused Juliet's heart to flutter." He also added that whilst the serial followed the tradition of many other soaps, through Steven and Frank they portrayed many real issues. Jan Moir writing for the Evening Times states: "He was orphaned when his parents were killed in a fire and is fast becoming the problem kid on the block." The Birmingham Post observed Steven's relationship with Selina as a "tale of twists" becoming more "twisted" with time. A columnist for The Newcastle Herald chose Steven and Selina's 1998 return episode as one of their "TV Highlights".

Analysing Steven's early characterisation, a columnist for Inside Soap said "once the school swat and a bit of a square, he grew up into an egghead who couldn't get a girl. Duller than one of Alf Stewart's bowling club cheese and wine parties, quiet Steven Matheson seemed destined to stay single." They opined that upon his return in 1995, Steven no longer had trouble finding a partner but had a "problem" finding one his own age. Their colleague opined that Steven was the "brightest foster kid" that Pippa had ever fostered. While another opined that "there was never any doubt that the quiet and studious Steven would end up at uni - even if a passionate fling with an older woman made him think twice about going. Steven passed his HSC with flying colours."
