= Rob Storey (Home and Away) =

- Home and Away character
- Portrayed by: Matthew Lilley
- Duration: 1994–95
- First appearance: 13 July 1994
- Last appearance: 12 May 1995
- Introduced by: Andrew Howie
In-universe information
- Occupation: Handyman (1994); Teacher (1994-95); Boat shed owner (1995-2003)

Rob Storey is a fictional character from the Australian Channel Seven soap opera Home and Away, played by Matthew Lilley. He appeared in the series from 13 July 1994 until 12 May 1995.

== Casting ==
Lilley played the role for one year. Three years after he left the series; Lilley said he still received fan mail from European viewers.

== Character development ==
Rob begins a relationship with Roxanne Miller (Lisa Lackey); but Lackey was unhappy with the storyline. She told a writer from Inside Soap that their relationship was "ridiculous" because she did not believe that Roxanne would be with "someone like Rob". She added that her character is "into equal rights for women, but this guy she's falling in love with seems so sexist - he's everything she hates." Rob manages to convince Roxanne to date him and they become a couple; but soon after she discovers that she is ill. Rob and Roxanne decide to shower together and he finds a lump in her breast. She is later diagnosed with breast cancer. Lackey explained that "Rob can't cope and Roxy's afraid he's going to leave her". She is only twenty-five and she needs Rob to reassure her that she is still attractive.

Their relationship is put under further pressure when Rob's former fiancé, Donna Bishop (Nicola Quilter) arrives in Summer Bay. A reporter from the publication said that "as much as Rob tries to reassure Roxy that his relationship with school teacher Donna is dead, Roxy just can't help but give in to her nagging doubts." A writer for the Home and Away – Official Collector’s Edition explained that "Roxy thought she had landed Mr Right in handyman Rob Storey, but things quickly fizzled out." Rob also changed profession during his tenure. He became bored with marking eassays and looks for something new. He decides to purchase the boat shed from Michael Ross (Dennis Coard), using all of his savings.

== Storylines ==
Rob first appears as a customer in Alf Stewart's (Ray Meagher) store. It transpires he is a former local who has returned to Summer Bay. Rob's visit to the store coincides with Jack Wilson's (Daniel Amalm) first shift as Alf's assistant which contributes to the somewhat eccentric service he receives. When Rob collects his dry cleaning, he is splashed by a careless driver and takes revenge by placing a potato in the man's exhaust pipe. This is witnessed by Roxanne. Rob settles back into Summer Bay and becomes friends with Shane Parrish (Dieter Brummer). He works as a handyman and applies to do some work at Donald Fisher's (Norman Coburn) house but Rob loses out to Mick O'Reilly (Peter Whitford). Mick proves to be workshy and dishonest and begins fabricating jobs in order to raise his price and Donald promptly fires him and hires Rob instead.

Roxy, initially unimpressed with Rob, soon falls for him after there is a spark between the two. They begin dating and caught one day in a compromising position on Donald's kitchen floor by Irene Roberts (Lynne McGranger). Irene agrees to keep quiet but when Sarah Thompson (Laura Vasquez) overhears Rob and Roxy discussing the incident in the Diner kitchen, it soon becomes common knowledge. Rob moves in with Irene, where he often ends up in the crossfire of her rows with Selina Cook (Tempany Deckert). After some encouragement from Roxy, Rob takes a teaching position at Summer Bay High. At a party where Selina and Shannon Reed (Isla Fisher) have a catfight, Rob turns the hose on them. Rob notices a lump on Roxy's breast and persuades her to check it out and she was soon diagnosed with cancer. Rob's efforts to support her are hampered slightly by the reappearance of his former fiancé Donna. Rob is prepared to propose to Roxy but she tells him she does not love him and leaves the Bay for treatment without him. Donna comforts Rob in the aftermath and for a while it seems they might reconcile until Donna's old boyfriend Andrew Warren (Adrian Lee) arrives in town. Rob is furious to learn Andrew used to beat Donna and flabbergasted when she reunites with. Rob's frustration boils over into work and he takes his anger out on Jack, resulting in him being fired. He then persuades Michael to sell him the boat shed and set up business there.

After Andrew hits Donna out of jealousy of her spending time with Rob and their other friend Travis Nash (Nic Testoni), Rob is the first person Donna runs to and he is on hand to rescue her when Andrew tries to stop her moving out. With Andrew gone, it seems like Rob and Donna may have another chance but Donna gets together with Travis. Rob is last seen helping Irene and Travis assist Curtis Reed (Shane Ammann) in getting over his alcohol addiction, following the death of his girlfriend Laura Bonnetti (Claudia Buttazoni). Rob is not seen again but mentioned by other residents over the next few years as still living in the bay.

== Reception ==
A writer from All About Soap said that Rob and Roxy were "the perfect couple". A columnist from Inside Soap said that Rob knew exactly what Roxy was like and it took him ages to win her over. They added that news of her breast cancer brought their relationship "down to earth with a bump". While their colleague Victoria Ross included Rob in her top thirty soap "hunks" feature and said that it was "no wonder Roxy can't keep her hands off him". Another added that "broken hearted" Rob's life became "one long detention" following Roxy's departure.
