= Alex Bennett (Home and Away) =

- Home and Away character
- Portrayed by: Nick Freedman
- Duration: 1995–1996
- First appearance: 16 October 1995
- Last appearance: 16 August 1996
- Introduced by: John Holmes
In-universe information
- Occupation: Artist
- Father: Saul Bennett
- Mother: Anna Bennett
- Half-brothers: Joey Rainbow

Alex Bennett is a fictional character from the Australian television soap opera Home and Away, played by Nick Freedman. The serial's producers thought of Freedman for the role of "easy-going hippy" Alex, having seen his previous work in other television dramas. Freedman was hesitant about accepting the role due to his career as a musician, so he only signed a year-long contract. He found the demands of filming the weekly serial intense, especially as he was used to late nights while performing with his band. He made his first appearance during the episode broadcast on 16 October 1995.

In addition to his hippy ways, Alex was portrayed as "laid-back" and "a real romantic at heart". Freedman said he was "a good guy", who had endured a difficult childhood and had become "a bit of a drifter". Alex is a cartoonist and painter, who becomes a "have-a-go hero" when he saves Shannon Reed (Isla Fisher) and Selina Cook (Tempany Deckert) from a group of youths. He later saves Selina from his father's religious cult. Writers soon established a romantic relationship between Alex and Shannon, as they share the same interests and outlook on life. Fisher thought that viewers could resonate with the couple, as Shannon was vulnerable, while Alex was gentle and submissive. Fisher and Freedman's height difference caused difficulty while filming their romantic scenes. Freedman also disliked the writing for the couple and tried to make his character's position in the relationship more realistic. On-screen, the age gap between Alex and Shannon causes issues for them, and they briefly break-up after a big argument.

The character was used to explore the effects of temporary blindness and brain injury, after a grenade explodes in his face. The incident seriously challenges Alex's relationship with Shannon, as he experiences personality changes. He kisses another woman and almost causes Angel Parrish's (Melissa George) daughter to drown. His strange behaviour also sees him accused of raping Chloe Richards (Kristy Wright) and he is later seen with Chloe's bracelet, which convinces Shannon and the Bay's residents of his guilt. After the real culprit is caught, Alex reconsiders his future in the Bay and decides to move to Paris. Off-screen, Freedman rejected a new contract with the show in order to pursue his music career. His final scenes aired on 16 August 1996.

== Casting ==
Actor and musician Nick Freedman initially came to the attention of producers due to his work in Echo Point and G.P.. When they began a search for "an easy-going hippy type", they immediately thought of Freedman for the part. Freedman admitted that it was a hard decision to accept the role of Alex, as he considered himself a musician first and an actor second. He later stated that "poverty got the better of him". Freedman signed a year long contract with the serial, but did not want to make a longer commitment due to his music career. He found it tough to give up his music job, saying "It's been very intense doing 60-hour weeks. The early morning starts have been very difficult for a man who likes nothing better than late nights and lots of noise." Freedman made his debut as Alex on 16 October 1995. A few months later, Freedman admitted that the demands of filming the serial were "hard to handle". He explained "I suppose I am reacting to the show in the same way that my character would, if he was being forced to get up at dawn and work a long day. I prefer late nights and long lie-ins so I am feeling jaded at the moment."

== Development ==
=== Characterisation and introduction ===
Freedman described his character as "something of an enigma, but basically he's a good guy." He also called Alex "forward" and "really laid-back", which was similar to himself. Alex is a cartoonist-turned-painter, which amused Freedman because he could not draw. An Inside Soap columnist described Alex's appearance as "rundown", but observed that he was popular with all of the Summer Bay residents and was "a real romantic at heart." Speaking of his character's fictional backstory, Freedman stated that Alex was "a bit of a drifter", who endured a difficult upbringing and was afraid of his parents. Alex was introduced as a "have-a-go hero", who saves Shannon Reed (Isla Fisher) and Selina Cook (Tempany Deckert) from a brawl involving a group of youths at the local drop-in centre. He finds a home in the Bay when Shane Parrish (Dieter Brummer) and Angel Parrish (Melissa George) invite him to move into their bungalow to help with the rent and babysitting. Producers later introduced the character's father Saul Bennett (David Ritchie), who is the leader of a religious cult. Saul lures Selina into joining the sect despite Alex's warnings. Alex becomes "the hero of the hour" again when he rescues Selina from Saul. His heroic act leads to jealously from Shannon, who thinks Selina might have feelings for Alex.

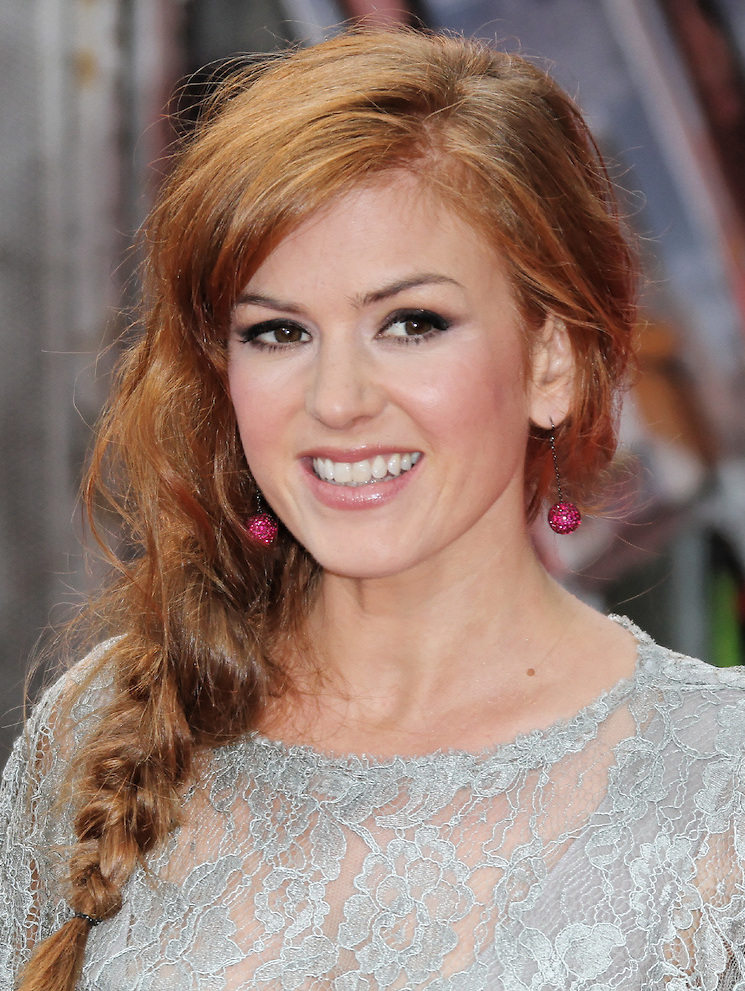
Alex dated Shannon Reed, played by Isla Fisher (pictured) during his time in the Bay. With their shared interests and independence, Fisher thought they stood out among the other couples in the show at the time.

=== Relationship with Shannon Reed ===
Alex soon becomes a love interest for Shannon, and after a series of dates, the pair feel that they are soulmates. Shannon even poses in the nude for one of Alex's artworks. A writer for Inside Soap thought that Shannon had found "true love" with Alex following a series of disastrous romances. The writer noted that the pair had the same outlook on life and love, and shared an interest in their respective creative talents. The 35cm height difference between Fisher and Freedman meant that their romantic scenes were often filmed with them seated. Occasionally Freedman would have to stand in trenches dug in the sand, and Fisher had to stand on sandbags or stacks of telephone books. Fisher said that she would get whiplash craning her neck to kiss Freedman or a back injury from hugging him, while Freedman joked: "There's been a little bit of what goes around comes around, because I have to basically bend down to try and reach Isla. There was talk of an apple box (for Isla) from time to time. That, of course is probably a little too sexist, and the more realistic suggestion would be that I cut my legs in half!"

The age gap between Alex and Shannon threatens their romance, as Alex hates her school friends and his mates thinks she is a "dag". The relationship then "suffers a major setback" following the death of Michael Ross (Dennis Coard), whose funeral Alex refuses to attend. He also refuses to move on from drawing cartoons and focus on more serious art. They then have "an unearthly argument about life, the universe and everything under the sun". Their break-up causes Shannon to suffer a relapse of her anorexia, and only the advice of her friend and mentor Mandy Thomas (Rachael Blake), convinces Shannon that she and Alex can deal with their issues and get their relationship back on track. Speaking to Di Stanley of TV Week, Freedman explained that the pair were well matched, saying: "They are compatible because of an artistic connection, and Shannon saw in him a different kind of guy from those she tended to fall for. Alex is perhaps a little older, perhaps a little more accepting now, and I think she's just refreshed by his matter-of-fact, realistic attitude."

Freedman found the writing for Alex and Shannon was at risk of focusing on "some issues of sexual politics" aimed at pleasing the younger female audience, so he felt he needed to make Alex and his position in the relationship more realistic. He told Stanley that Alex was patient with Shannon to the point that it was becoming unrealistic, so he tried to make his character appear frustrated occasionally, rather than being "a total sensitive new age guy, perfect appendage pushover." Fisher revealed that she had received positive feedback about the Alex and Shannon's relationship. She thought it was because the pair were both artistic and had a lot in common, which differed to the other couples in Summer Bay at the time. They were not surfers nor did they hang out at the Diner, instead they preferred to show their independence by going on picnics. She also thought that viewers could resonate with them, as Shannon is vulnerable, while Alex is "a more gentle, more submissive male character, more of a spiritual Bohemian character." She added that they were "very much in love" and the perfect couple "for the time being."

=== Brain injury ===
Writers used the character to explore the topics of temporary blindness and brain injury. The storyline begins with Alex and Shannon discovering the site of a plane crash, which killed Simon Broadhurst's (Julian Garner) grandmother. Wanting to understand more about wartime life, the pair visit an old army base, where they find a cache of grenades in a bunker. They leave to report their discovery, but Sam Marshall (Ryan Clark) and Hannah Williams (Brooke Anderson) also come across the site. When Alex and Shannon return with the authorities, Alex manages to push Sam out of the way as one of the grenades explodes. Alex is blinded by the explosion and is rushed to the hospital, where Kelly Watson (Katrina Hobbs) is unable to provide him with a positive diagnosis. The incident becomes the biggest challenge to Alex's relationship with Shannon.

When Alex's bandages are removed, it becomes clear that he has also sustained a brain injury, which affects his personality. He is no longer the "mild-mannered boy" he once was. An Inside Soap writer observed: "Alex is a man behaving badly. For some reason this appears to be causing the women of Summer Bay some concern, especially Shannon. What on earth has become of her boy wonder?" They expressed apprehension about the decision to release Alex from hospital and questioned whether it was a good idea, as he was still not himself. Alex kisses Steven Matheson's (Adam Willits) girlfriend Lindsay Simons (Kate Agnew), and he almost causes Angel's infant daughter to drown. His behaviour later leads him to be accused of raping Chloe Richards, whose actress Kristy Wright explained: "We don't see who attacks Chloe. But Alex is in the frame. With the swelling on his brain following the explosion, he has been acting really strangely recently, and so he's immediately a suspect." Alex is later seen with Chloe's bracelet, which convinces Shannon that he is the attacker. The other Bay residents also become convinced that he is the culprit, until Brad Cooper (Bruce Samazan) is apprehended for the crime. Alex struggles to forgive Shannon for doubting him about Chloe's attack and is "disappointed" in the locals for thinking he was guilty. He then reconsiders his future in the Bay.

=== Departure ===
Freedman was offered a three-year contract with the show, but he was keen to leave. His character was duly written out, and his departure scenes aired on 16 August 1996. Alex decides to move to Paris and asks Shannon to come with him. She initially suspects that the move is related to his brain injury, but soon gets caught up in the romance of the idea and agrees go. However, after receiving a reality check from Pippa Ross (Debra Lawrence), she tells Alex that she will not be going with him. After filming his final scenes, Freedman came over to the UK to star in a pantomime and pursue his music career with his band, Lurch. Freedman had his long hair cut, partly as he was embarrassed by the attention from the show's fans. Of this, he commented, "It does not come naturally to me. I want to avoid living under any kind of illusion and fame is an illusion. It was weird that this thing (Home and Away) happened to me. I had not seen myself as an actor and I was never even a soap watcher. For me it was a creative opportunity. It's not great literature or anything like that but you get to go in there and have a job that's well paid and do something different every day." Freedman later launched "scathing attacks" on his co-stars, calling some of them "prima donnas". He called Fisher "a silly little redhead" and said she was difficult to work with, seemingly confirming a rumour that they did not get along during their time on the show. Freedman later said "The best bit was when I had to act blind because I didn't have to see her." Fisher did not respond to his comments and was defended by their co-stars.

== Storylines ==
Alex saves Shannon Reed, Selina Roberts, and Damian Roberts (Matt Doran) from a gang of thugs who harass them. Alex makes his romantic intentions clear towards Shannon, who initially resists as she was abused as a child, but the pair discover they have a similar artistic temperament, as he is a painter and she is a writer. Alex moves in with Shane Parrish, who he attended night classes with, and his wife Angel. Shannon is uneasy with this arrangement, as she made advances towards Shane several months earlier. However, Alex is able to mend things between them and persuades the couple to rehire Shannon as a babysitter.

Alex's estranged father, Saul Bennett arrives and Alex is horrified as Saul runs a commune in Yabbie Creek known as the Children of Saul. Alex resents Saul for his bad childhood and his mother Anna's suicide. He warns Selina about Saul and advises her to stay away from him. After Selina realises what Saul is like, she is kidnapped by him. Alex, Irene Roberts (Lynne McGranger), and the police pursue Saul and rescue Selina. Saul is arrested and jailed.

When Angel goes into labour, Alex and Shannon attempt to drive her to the hospital, but are impeded by a flood caused by a storm. They nearly get lost in the bush, but end up at the Summer Bay Caravan Park. They get Angel to the safety of Summer Bay House. Michael Ross drowns that night in the storm and in the aftermath of his death, Alex is dismissive of spiritual matters saying there is no afterlife, upsetting Shannon and Michael's widow Pippa. Alex apologises as his experiences with his own father have left him bitter. Shannon's friend Mandy Thomas returns to the Bay, and Shannon worries she may be caught between Mandy and Alex, but she is proved wrong and feels jealous when Mandy and Alex become good friends.

Alex is left temporarily blinded when a grenade explodes in his face. He regains his vision, but the blast leaves him with a minor brain injury, which causes him to behave strangely. When Chloe Richards is raped, Alex is accused by her boyfriend Curtis Reed (Shane Ammann) of committing the crime, but he is cleared despite being near the scene that night. Alex becomes distracted while helping Angel bathe her daughter and she nearly drowns. Angel is understanding, but wants him to move out and he rents a caravan at the caravan park, where he gradually recovers.

Joey Rainbow (Alex O'Han), an old member of Saul's commune, arrives in town, and Alex soon realises he is also Saul's son, thus his half-brother. They clash over their differing attitudes towards Saul, but eventually bond and take a camping trip together. Alex receives compensation for his accident and decides to move to Paris in order to further his artistic career. He spends one final night with Shannon in his caravan before leaving her a letter and a black rose.

== Reception ==
As Alex moved in with Shane and Angel, an Inside Soap columnist noted that "The happy hippy isn't exactly the perfect childminder for Dylan as they soon find out". Of Alex and Shannon, writers for the publication commented that "the pair seemed really well matched", and branded them "Summer Bay's resident hippy couple". Sally Swingewood of the Burton Trader observed "When Summer Bay first saw Shannon and Alex launch into their sizzling romance we all thought it was going to be true love. And now it's fizzled out to 'just good friends' it's still very amicable if a bit dull." Swingewood suggested that the scriptwriters use the off-screen animosity between the actors to liven things up. Freedman's role in the serial led him to be called an "Aussie soap heart throb" by a critic from the Cannock Chase Post. Ahead of Alex's departure, another writer for Inside Soap stated "the Bay is set to lose one of its most colourful characters."
