= List of Home and Away characters introduced in 1995 =

Home and Away is an Australian soap opera first broadcast on the Seven Network on 17 January 1988. The following is a list of characters that first appeared in 1995, by order of first appearance. They were all introduced by the show's then executive producer John Holmes. The 8th season of Home and Away began airing on 16 January 1995. The first introduction of the year was Daniel Goddard as drug dealer Eric Phillips. Adrian Lee began portraying teacher Andrew Warren in March. Nic Testoni joined the serial in April as Travis Nash. Kristy Wright took on the role of Chloe Richards in June. Kimberley Joseph began playing Joanne Brennan from July. Katrina Hobbs began playing doctor Kelly Watson in August. Nick Freedman debuted as Alex Bennett in October, while Quinn Jackson also made her first appearance. The following month, David Ritchie arrived as Alex's father, Saul.

== Opening titles timeline ==
=== 1995–97 ===
Color key
Main cast (opening credits)
Recurring guest star (closing credits in 3+ episodes)
Guest star (closing credits in 1–2 episodes)

Character	Actor	1995				1995–96	1996				1996–97
Character	Actor	1606–1690	1691–1705	1706–1720	1721–1795	1796–1880	1881–1915	1916–1920	1921–2000	2001–2060	2061–2120
Pippa Fletcher	Debra Lawrence	M	M	M	M	M	M	M	M	M	M
Sally Fletcher	Kate Ritchie	M	M	M	M	M	M	M	M	M	M
Ailsa Stewart	Judy Nunn	M	M	M	M	M	M	M	M	M	M
Alf Stewart	Ray Meagher	M	M	M	M	M	M	M	M	M	M
Donald Fisher	Norman Coburn	M	M	M	M	M	M	M	M	M	M
Michael Ross	Dennis Coard	M	M	M	M	M	M				
Sam Marshall	Ryan Clark	M	M	M	M	M	M	M	M	M	M
Shane Parrish	Dieter Brummer	M	M	M	M	M					
Angel Brooks	Melissa George	M	M	M	M	M	M	M	M		
Irene Roberts	Lynne McGranger	M	M	M	M	M	M	M	M	M	M
Jack Wilson	Daniel Amalm	M	M	M	M	M	M	M			
Rob Storey	Matthew Lilley	M									
Curtis Reed	Shane Ammann	M	M	M	M	M	M	M	M	M	M
Shannon Reed	Isla Fisher	M	M	M	M	M	M	M	M	M	M
Selena Roberts	Tempany Deckert	M	M	M	M	M	M	M	M	M	M
Donna Bishop	Nicola Quilter	M	M	M							
Marilyn Chambers	Emily Symons			M	M	M	M	M	M	M	M
Kelly Watson	Katrina Hobbs				R	M	M	M	M	M	M
Steven Matheson	Adam Willits				R	M	M	M	M	M	
Travis Nash	Nic Testoni	R	R	R	R	M	M	M	M	M	M
Chloe Richards	Kristy Wright				R	R	R	R	M	M	M
Alex Bennett	Nick Freedman					R	R	R	M		
Liam Tanner	Peter Scarf						R	R	R	M	M
Stephanie Mboto	Fleur Beaupert								R	M	M
Joey Rainbow	Alex O'Han								R	M	M
Jesse McGregor	Ben Unwin								R	R	M
Rebecca Fisher	Belinda Emmett								R	R	M
Casey Mitchell	Rebecca Croft								R	R	M

=== 1997–98 ===
Color key
Main cast (opening credits)
Recurring guest star (closing credits in 3+ episodes)
Guest star (closing credits in 1–2 episodes)

Character	Actor	1996–97	1997							1997–98
Character	Actor	2061–2120	2121–2135	2136–2140	2141–2170	2171–2215	2216–2230	2231–2275	2276–2290	2291–2345
Pippa Fletcher	Debra Lawrence	M	M	M	M	M	M	M	M	M
Sally Fletcher	Kate Ritchie	M	M	M	M	M	M	M	M	M
Ailsa Stewart	Judy Nunn	M	M	M	M	M	M	M	M	M
Alf Stewart	Ray Meagher	M	M	M	M	M	M	M	M	M
Donald Fisher	Norman Coburn	M	M	M	M	M	M	M	M	M
Sam Marshall	Ryan Clark	M	M	M	M	M	M	M	M	M
Irene Roberts	Lynne McGranger	M	M	M	M	M	M	M	M	M
Curtis Reed	Shane Ammann	M	M							
Shannon Reed	Isla Fisher	M	M	M	M	M				
Selena Roberts	Tempany Deckert	M	M	M	M	M	M	M		
Marilyn Chambers	Emily Symons	M	M	M	M	M	M	M	M	M
Kelly Watson	Katrina Hobbs	M	M	M						
Travis Nash	Nic Testoni	M	M	M	M	M	M	M	M	M
Chloe Richards	Kristy Wright	M	M	M	M	M	M	M	M	M
Liam Tanner	Peter Scarf	M	M	M	M					
Stephanie Mboto	Fleur Beaupert	M								
Joey Rainbow	Alex O'Han	M	M	M	M	M	M	M	M	M
Jesse McGregor	Ben Unwin	M	M	M	M	M	M	M	M	M
Rebecca Fisher	Belinda Emmett	M	M	M	M	M	M	M	M	M
Casey Mitchell	Rebecca Croft	M	M	M	M	M	M	M	M	
Lachlan Fraser	Richard Grieve	R	R	R	R	M	M	M	M	M
Tiegan Brook	Sally Marrett	R			R	R	M	M	M	M
Aaron Welles	Richie Gudgeon				R	R	M	M	M	M
Justine Welles	Bree Desborough				G	R	R	M	M	M

== Eric Phillips ==
Eric Phillips
- Home and Away character
- Portrayed by: Daniel Goddard
- First appearance: 16 January 1995
- Last appearance: 10 February 1995
- Introduced by: John Holmes

Eric Phillips, played by Daniel Goddard. Goddard signed to guest star in the show for six weeks. Eric is characterised as being calculating and has muscles. Goddard told Victoria Ross from Inside Soap that "Eric can be manipulative and he knows how to get people on side". Jack Wilson (Daniel Amalm) and Curtis Reed (Shane Ammann) befriend Eric and ask him for help getting into shape, he reveals that he uses steroids. Goddard explained that Eric agrees to help the duo "but things turn sour when Eric suggests that Jack try steroids to build up his muscles even more." The actor revealed that Eric only leaves Summer Bay after causing a lot of trouble. Goddard's stint on Home and Away proved popular with viewers and he received much fan mail. He added that there was a possibility of Eric returning once again. Ross said that Eric was a "bad boy" character with better biceps than Shane Parrish (Dieter Brummer). She added that Eric's arrival had the Summer Bay females "hearts fluttering" and the males "reaching for their dumbbells." A writer from the Home and Away Official Collector's Edition said that "through 1995, Goddard caused a storm of trouble in Home and Away as bad boy Eric Phillips".

Eric arrives in town and makes friends with Jack and Curtis. They are impressed with his physique and asks for tips. He tells them he uses steroids. Curtis is reluctant but Jack is determined, even more so after Curtis bests him in an arm-wrestling contest. Shannon Reed (Isla Fisher) takes an interest in Eric and they begin dating. Shannon's friends and family warn her about Eric but she refuses to listen. Eric gets violent with Shannon and Jack intervenes. Eric then leaves Summer Bay.

== Andrew Warren ==
Andrew Warren
- Home and Away character
- Portrayed by: Adrian Lee
- First appearance: 16 March 1995
- Last appearance: 3 May 1995
- Introduced by: John Holmes
In-universe information
- Occupation: Maths Teacher

Andrew Warren, played by Adrian Lee, made his first appearance on 16 March 1995 and departed on 3 May 1995. Andrew was introduced into serial as the former lover of established character Donna Bishop (Nicola Quilter) who arrives in order to reconcile with her. Lee told Victoria Ross from Inside Soap that Donna is "in big trouble" when she gets back together with Andrew again. He explained that "there are a lot of men like Andrew who seem like nice guys on the surface but there is something that just makes them flip." In his case jealousy is the trigger of his violence, each time "he sees Donna with another man he just lashes out". After Andrew witnesses Donna with Rob Storey (Matthew Lilley) and Travis Nash (Nic Testoni) he hits Donna and bruises her eye. Lee researched the issue by looking at associated text and female victims of domestic violence. He felt "edgy" about playing issue led storylines, but he was more inclined to portray because the story behind the abuse was an important subject. However, Lee claimed that as an actor he would attempt to find excuses for Andrew's behaviour. Lee wanted to return to the serial for another stint. He concluded that "it's so much fun getting to act out a horrible character; I just loved being a baddie."

Andrew arrives and immediately gets Shane Parrish (Dieter Brummer) offside by parking in a handicapped spot as his fiancée Angel Brooks (Melissa George) is in a wheelchair. Andrew takes the position of Maths teacher for Year 11 and Donna is horrified to find him at the same school as her. She tells him she never wants to see him again. Rob Storey, Donna's friend who also teaches at the school warns Andrew away. He is made to feel less than welcome in town when several people learn of his violent past with Donna. Andrew becomes Jack Wilson's (Daniel Amalm) tutor, but Michael Ross (Dennis Coard) is reluctant to let him continue with the tutoring. Eventually he gives in. After a while people begin to see Andrew is genuinely trying to change and their opinion changes when he helps Irene Roberts (Lynne McGranger) after she collapses from stress and is able to raise Sally Fletcher's (Kate Ritchie) grades in order for her to take Maths classes at Year 11 level. In spite of this, Donna refuses to believe it and slaps him only to feel that she is no better than him. Donna apologise to Andrew and realises he is trying to change and forgives him and he promises never to hit her again.

Andrew and Donna reconcile much to Rob's horror. Rob tries to get Donna to see the sense and lashes out at Andrew, but this only elevates Andrew in Donna's estimation and she is hostile towards Rob and tells him to stay away. Rob apologises grudingly and accepts the relationship. Andrew asks Donna to move in with him and she agrees. Travis Nash returns to town and Donna and Rob spend a lot of time together reminiscing about the day they all met ten years earlier. After witnessing, Donna having fun with her friends, Andrew becomes jealous and when he sees Donna give Rob a kiss for helping her move some furniture in Andrew's flat, he hits her, and ends up trashing the flat after Donna leaves him. Donna moves out and when she comes for the rest of her things, Andrew tries to stop her leaving and almost hits her again, but is interrupted by Rob who arrives in his car and rescues Donna by punching Andrew. The police arrive and arrest Andrew issuing him a summons and a restraining order and he resigns from the school and leaves the bay.

The episode featuring the climax of Donna's domestic abuse at the hands of Andrew was nominated for "Best Episode in a Television Drama Serial" at the Australian Film Institute Awards in 1995.

== Travis Nash ==
Travis Nash, played by Nic Testoni, made his first on screen appearance on 10 April 1995 and departed on 11 August 1999. For his portrayal of Travis, Testoni won the "Most Popular New Talent" Logie Award in 1996. A year later, Testoni was nominated for "Most Popular Actor". In 1998, Travis and Rebecca were named "Best Couple" at the Inside Soap Awards. They received a nomination in the same category the following year. Judy Johnson of The Sun-Herald branded Travis a "dreamboat fisherman."

== Chloe Richards ==
Chloe Richards, played by Kristy Wright. She debuted on-screen during the episode airing on 28 June 1995. Wright was asked to join the regular cast of Home and Away as Chloe, after initially appearing as a background extra in the series. The episode involving Chloe's confrontation with her rapist Brad Cooper received the Australian Writers' Guild award for "Best Episode in a Television Serial" in 1997 and was presented to the episode's writer Greg Haddrick. For her portrayal of Chloe, Wright was nominated for Best actress at the 1998 Logie Awards and was nominated the following year for "Sexiest Female" at The Inside Soap Awards.

== Kelly Watson ==
Kelly Watson, played by Katrina Hobbs, made her first appearance on 28 August 1995. Hobbs joined Home and Away in August 1995. To prepare for the role she followed doctors around Sydney's St. Vincent hospital and took notes. In an interview with Daniel Dasey from The Sydney Morning Herald, Hobbs told of how her fellow cast members labelled her "Doctor Death", following the death of Shane Parrish (Dieter Brummer). She quit the serial in 1997.

== Joanne Brennan ==
Joanne Brennan
- Home and Away character
- Portrayed by: Kimberley Joseph
- Duration: 1995-1996
- First appearance: 24 July 1995
- Last appearance: 27 August 1996
- Introduced by: John Holmes
In-universe information
- Occupation: Secretary

Joanne Brennan, portrayed by Kimberley Joseph. Joseph originally auditioned for the part of Donna Bishop, but lost out to Nicola Quilter. Joanne was introduced as old school acquaintance of Angel Parrish (Melissa George) who comes back to make her life a misery. Joseph, who previously appeared in axed Channel 9 soap opera told Rachel Browne of the Sun-Herald: "It's a good change of pace for me because my character in Paradise Beach was so saccharin-sweet", she said.

Joanne is a former schoolmate of Angel Parrish. They meet when Angel applies for a modelling job with Raoul Irving (Lloyd Morris). Joanne is rude and bitchy towards Angel when she turns down an offer to share the prize money of $10,000. Joanne takes a position at Summer Bay High as a secretary and secretly begins dealing drugs to students. Chloe Richards (Kristy Wright) is one of her customers. Joanne seduces Steven Matheson (Adam Willits) away from nurse Lindsay Simons (Kate Agnew). When a small bag of speed is found at the school, Joanne accuses Chloe of informing on her. In order to divert attention from the drug matter, Joanne accuses her employer, principal Donald Fisher (Norman Coburn) of sexual harassment. Chloe's conscience gets the better of her and Donald is cleared and Joanne is arrested for dealing.

She is paroled several months later and schemes to con Simon Broadhurst (Julian Garner) out of his money by feigning an interest in him. Angel, who is now interested in Simon after previously rejecting him, is upset by this. Joanne and Simon prepare to leave the bay but Simon promptly dumps her on the roadside and chooses Angel after learning of Joanne's lying and scheming. Joanne is then picked up by another rich man in a limousine and leaves the bay.

== Alex Bennett ==
Alex Bennett, portrayed by Nick Freedman, made his first appearance on 16 October 1995 and departed on 16 August 1996. Home and Away producers were scouting for an "easygoing hippy type" actor. They were familiar with Freedman's work in the shows Echo Point and GP and offered him the role of Alex. Prior to landing the role of Alex, Freedman was also a musician. Alex was introduced as a love interest for established character Shannon Reed (Isla Fisher). An Inside Soap columnist described Alex as a "laid-back, have-a-go hero". Alex is a popular Summer Bay resident who is liked by all. He is a struggling artist who looks run down, but he has a "romantic heart". He first meets Shannon when he rescues her from a group of men and soon begins a relationship with her. Shannon needed someone in her life and they appeared to be a good match. But their relationship soon becomes problematic. Freedman soon decided to leave the series and it was announced in July 1996 that he had already filmed his final scenes. Following his departure, Freedman criticised Fisher as a "silly little redhead". Freedman left to concentrate on his musical career as the frontman of his own band, Lurch. He told Kendall hill of The Age "I'm up against silly prejudices that say you can only be recognised creatively in one field – which is usually just a manufactured image anyway. But Lurch's music is bigger than nonsense like that."

== Quinn Jackson ==
Quinn Jackson
- Home and Away character
- Portrayed by: Danielle Spencer (1995); Lara Cox (2017)
- Duration: 1995, 2017
- First appearance: 26 October 1995
- Last appearance: 11 December 2017
- Introduced by: John Holmes (1995); Lucy Addario (2017)
In-universe information
- Occupation: Student; Waitress; Cruise ship singer
- Father: Alf Stewart
- Mother: Mary Jackson
- Stepfather: Frank
- Stepmother: Ailsa Stewart
- Half-brothers: Owen Dalby; Duncan Stewart; Clem
- Half-sisters: Roo Stewart
- Sons: Ryder Jackson

Quinn Jackson made her first appearance on 26 October 1995. She was originally played by Danielle Spencer. The character was introduced as the daughter of Alf Stewart (Ray Meagher). Meagher explained that in Alf's fictional backstory he met Quinn's mother, an American nurse stationed in Singapore, during the Vietnam War, they had a fling and she returned to the United States without telling him she was pregnant. Meagher said that Alf wants to help Quinn when he learns who she is, but she "hates him on sight" when she catches him being grumpy with one of the Summer Bay residents. He also described Quinn as "very manipulative" and said she creates problems between him and his wife. Meagher praised Spencer's professionalism, saying "she has so much energy that you literally work off her. I felt as thought I was being carried along for the ride." In October 2017, it was announced that the character would be returning to the show, after a 22-year absence. Actress Lara Cox was cast in the role. Ahead of Quinn's return, her son Ryder Jackson (Lukas Radovich) was introduced. Quinn returned on 23 November.

Quinn arrives in Summer Bay to see Alf Stewart. She finds him at his store, but does not disclose her identity upon meeting him when she witnesses an argument between him and Shannon Reed (Isla Fisher). Quinn rents a caravan from Michael (Dennis Coard) and Pippa Ross (Debra Lawrence). Alf is immediately suspicious of her and thinks she is a reporter trying to dig up dirt on the proposed caravan park development. He confronts Quinn, who denies being a reporter in a heated argument. Quinn decides to leave, but Alf tracks her down at the bus stop and she reveals she is his daughter. Alf then recounts meeting Quinn's mother Mary during the Vietnam War, when she was stationed in Australia, and they had a relationship, but Mary left town without telling Alf she was pregnant.

Alf then introduces Quinn to his wife Ailsa (Judy Nunn) and son Duncan (Lewis Devaney). Ailsa and Quinn clash a lot due to Ailsa's suspicions of Quinn's true motives, as Alf barely knows her. Steven Matheson (Adam Willits) takes an interest in Quinn and they begin a short relationship. Quinn tells Steven her true motive is to get revenge on Alf for abandoning her mother as soon as he found out she was pregnant, leaving her to be raised by Mary and her stepfather, Frank, who admittedly did not care for her. After seeing Quinn stir things up between Alf, Ailsa and the Rosses over the development, Steven decides to end the relationship with her.

Alf explains to Quinn that he regrets not being there for her while she was growing up and offers her a share of the development's profits, which she rejects. Alf reveals that Mary's commanding officer sent her back to the United States when knowledge of their relationship arose. Quinn is shocked when she realises Alf is telling the truth, and that Frank had lied to her. This makes her feel guilty as she had leaked a report that proves the development will have a negative effect on the town. Quinn admits she wanted to make Alf pay and is sorry, but he refuses to hear it and she decides to leave. However, after talking with Ailsa, Alf decides to give Quinn a second chance, but arrives at the wharf just in time to see her seaplane take off.

In 2017, Quinn gets in contact with Alf after seeing that her son Ryder is in Summer Bay. She asks him to send Ryder back to the camp he has run away from. Quinn turns up at Summer Bay House two weeks early and Ryder introduces her to her half-sister Roo Stewart (Georgie Parker). Alf arrives home and they decide to go to the Pier Diner to talk. Quinn reveals that she is living in Brisbane and is a singer on a cruise ship. Roo notices that Quinn constantly puts Ryder down and suggests that she should be more supportive. Quinn takes offence and tells Ryder they are leaving, but Alf persuades her to stay in the Bay for a while.

== Saul Bennett ==
Saul Bennett, played by former Macquarie University Senior Lecturer Dr. David Ritchie, made his first on-screen appearance on 21 November 1995. Saul is a leader of a religious cult and attempts to lure Selina Roberts (Tempany Deckert) into joining the cause. Tina Baker of Soaplife said " Home and Away's cult leader Saul was nice Joey Rainbow's dad, but that didn't stop him from brainwashing his devotees, stealing Irene's baby, kidnapping Selina on her wedding day, and trying to force her to have his child...as you do." A columnist from Inside Soap described Saul as "nuttier than a veggie roast" and cults and fires "go hand-in-hand" in soap operas. They added that Saul looked just like Gandalf from The Lord of the Rings.

== Others ==
Date(s)	Character	Actor	Circumstances
24 January–16 February	Wendy McFarlane	Fiona Stewart	Wendy is Irene Roberts's (Lynne McGranger) sister. She and her son Nelson (Laurence Breuls) arrive in Summer Bay. It is clear that Wendy is broke and was last successful as a country singer four years previously but she is in denial until Irene confronts her about it. They argue but later reconcile. Wendy takes a job working for Irene at the diner but it does not last. She and Nelson leave the bay.
24 January–14 September	Nelson McFarlane	Laurence Breuls	Nelson is Irene Roberts's (Lynne McGranger) nephew. He and his mother Wendy (Fiona Stewart) arrive in the bay for a visit. Selina Cook (Tempany Deckert) is attracted to Nelson and they become a couple. Nelson begins stealing newspapers, leaving Jack Wilson (Daniel Amalm) and Curtis Reed (Shane Ammann) to get the blame for it. When the boys catch him, Nelson admits he is doing it to help support his mother and they agree to go into partnership. Nelson and Wendy leave. Several months later, Nelson returns keen to see Selina who has not told him she is now dating Curtis. Selina lets him down gently and he begins dating Sally Fletcher (Kate Ritchie). When Jack is trapped under an overturned car he stole, Nelson pulls him free and is burned in the resulting bushfire when the car explodes. Nelson suffers nightmares and flashbacks to the accident and is later transferred to a burns unit in the city.
20 February–10 March	Dr. Gordon	Bud Tingwell	Dr. Gordon attends to Angel Brooks (Melissa George) after she is run over by Alf Stewart's (Ray Meagher) land rover.
27 February–22 September	Elizabeth Clarke	Gwen Plumb	Elizabeth is an elderly lady who befriends Selina Cook (Tempany Deckert) when she visits Angel Brooks (Melissa George) in hospital. She returns several months later and tells Selina she only has days to live and they spend time together before she dies.
1 March–7 April	Laura Bonnetti	Claudia Buttazonni	Laura is an Italian exchange student who comes to stay with Alf (Ray Meagher) and Ailsa Stewart (Judy Nunn). Both Jack Wilson (Daniel Amalm) and Curtis Reed (Shane Ammann) take a liking to her, Laura clearly prefers Curtis and they begin dating. Shannon Reed (Isla Fisher) takes an instant dislike to Laura. Always seeking a thrill, Laura often leads Curtis into trouble. Ailsa is annoyed with their antics and comes down hard on them. Laura and Curtis later rob a shop in the local mall. One night, Laura dares Curtis to cross a railway line but he backs out. Laura defiantly runs out onto the line and Curtis tells her to look out but it is too late and she is instantly killed by an oncoming train.
1–8 March	Mary O'Brien	Carole Skinner	Mary is hired by Alf (Ray Meagher) and Ailsa Stewart (Judy Nunn) as their housekeeper. They agree to let her stay but Mary begins to overstay her welcome. Mary tells Alf she has come to town to track down her daughter and needs to find her. Alf writes a cheque for $500 in order to get rid of Mary and leaves. It is later discovered Mary is a con artist and Alf cannot stop the cheque as it has been already cashed.
14–23 March	Phil	Marc Grey	Phil is Angel Brooks' (Melissa George) physiotherapist who helps her to walk again.
23 March–14 April	Marcus Neeks	David Price	Marcus is a local student who Shannon Reed (Isla Fisher) briefly dates.
4 April 1995–21 October 1996	Reverend Brown	Jeremy Chance	Reverend Brown is a minister at St James' church. He marries Shane Parrish (Dieter Brummer) and Angel Brooks (Melissa George) and later conducts the wedding of Donald Fisher (Norman Coburn) and Marilyn Chambers (Emily Symons) along with catholic priest Father Kirkpatrick (Brian Harrison).
28 April–11 August	Paul Harris	Ramsay Everingham	Paul is Angel Parrish's (Melissa George) ex-boyfriend and the father of their son, Dylan (Corey Glaister). He and his mother, Anne (Fay Kelton) battle Angel and her husband Shane Parrish (Dieter Brummer) for custody of Dylan. When Anne's interfering becomes too much, Paul surrenders custody to Angel and Shane. Several months later, Paul is revealed to be making nuisance calls towards Angel and stalking her. He tries to kidnap Dylan but is foiled by Shannon Reed (Isla Fisher) and is arrested.
8 May–21 June	Teresa Lynch	Diane Craig	Teresa arrives in Summer Bay to take on the vacant position of Deputy principal at the local High School. She and her son, Joe (Justin Rosniak) move into the beach house with Irene Roberts (Lynne McGranger) and Selina Cook (Tempany Deckert). When Selina miscarries, Teresa drives her to the hospital. Teresa frequently clashes with Donald Fisher (Norman Coburn) over discipline and grades. She also falls out with Joe. When a seaplane crashes, Teresa, Angel Parrish (Melissa George) and her son Dylan (Corey Glaister) are among the casualties. They are eventually found and Teresa is taken to a city hospital.
9 May–21 June	Joseph "Joe" Lynch	Justin Rosniak	Joe arrives with his mother Teresa (Diane Craig) and they begin staying at the Beach house Irene Roberts (Lynne McGranger) and Selina Cook (Tempany Deckert). Joe manages to upset Selina by making comments about her pregnancy. Jack Wilson (Daniel Amalm) takes a dislike to Joe at first but they become friends. Joe bullies Sally Fletcher (Kate Ritchie) for a while because she is good at maths, but eventually owns up after Donald Fisher (Norman Coburn) confronts him. Joe resents Teresa for breaking up with his father and frequently argues with her. However, when Teresa is injured in a seaplane crash, Joe leaves to be with her.
11–12 May	Kim	Charde Doherty	Kim is a crisis care foster child who stays with the Ross family. She causes chaos in the house when she pulls a string off Jack Wilson's (Daniel Amalm) guitar and tears Sally Fletcher's (Kate Ritchie) teddy bear. It is revealed that Kim's mother often neglects her and leaves her and her siblings alone. Kim is eventually returned home.
29 May–23 June	Gus Bishop	Samuel Johnson	Gus is Donna Bishop's (Nicola Quilter) teenage brother. He arrives in Summer Bay after running away from their parents. He begins hanging around with Sally Fletcher (Kate Ritchie). They begin dating but Gus' bad behaviour which includes stealing from Alf Stewart's (Ray Meagher) store and burning Jack Wilson's (Daniel Amalm) guitar proves too much.Sally breaks up with Gus and in retaliation he throws a brick through her window. Donna and her boyfriend Travis Nash (Nic Testoni) tell Gus to return home or face the police. Gus complies and leaves the bay.
31 May	Charles Bishop	David Baldwyn	Charles is the father of Donna (Nicola Quilter) and Gus (Samuel Johnson). He tells Gus off for the worry he has caused him and his mother.
8 June 1995–18 November 1997	Arthur Briggs	Derek Amer; David Downer	Arthur is the head of the department administering Summer Bay High. He arrives to investigate Donald Fisher's decision to suspend Selina Cook (Tempany Deckert) after being caught in the boys' quarters on a camping trip. He overrules Donald and leaves. Arthur and his wife Janet (Suzanne Dudley) join Donald and his fiancée Marilyn for a meal. Arthur investigates allegations of Selina's relationship with teacher Steven Matheson (Adam Willits). He later evaluates trainee teacher, Brett Egan (Emmanuel Marshall).
21 June–7 July	Maya Krakajcek	Xenia Natalenko	Maya is a Yugoslavaian girl who Michael Ross (Dennis Coard) finds in the bush following a seaplane crash. Her father is killed and she is fostered by Michael and his wife Pippa (Debra Lawrence). Jan Conolly (Pat Pitney) arrives to collect Maya on her 9th birthday but she is reluctant to leave after bonding with the Rosses. Maya is eventually returned to Yugoslavia.
26 June 1995–17 June 1998	Jan Connolly	Pat Pitney	Jan is from the Department of Child Services. She places Maya Krakajcek (Xenia Natalenko) in the care of Michael and Pippa Ross. On Maya's 9th birthday, Jan returns to collect in order to return her to Yugoslavia. Jan returns after Pippa is left brain damaged following an attack by Kye Lyons (Ian Bliss). She visits the family and explains that Sam Marshall (Ryan Clark) could possibly be removed and placed into another foster home if Pippa's memory does not return. Jan later visits Chloe Richards (Kristy Wright) when she struggles to cope with her daughter Olivia on her own following her partner Lachlan Fraser (Richard Grieve) being hospitalised.
29 June 1995–30 August 1996	Max Richards	Rob Steele	Max is Chloe Richards' (Kristy Wright) father. He is racist towards Jack Wilson (Daniel Amalm) when Chloe begins dating him and threatens him. Max hits Chloe when she continues seeing Jack. After Chloe flees to Western Australia to track down her mother, Maureen (Liz Burch), Max leaves. He returns to town the following year when Chloe is raped. Max blames Curtis Reed (Shane Ammann) for not walking Chloe home on the night attack happened. On the day of the trial, Chloe fails to identify the accused, Colin Parker as her rapist. Enraged, Max leaves the courthouse and produces a shotgun and shoots Colin dead. Chloe visits Max in prison on Father's day.
6 July	Carol O’Reilly	Amanda Wenban	Carol and Ingrid are the wives of Mick O'Reilly (Peter Whitford), they arrive at the diner to expose his bigamy during his engagement to Irene Roberts (Lynne McGranger), which Irene promptly calls off.
6 July	Ingrid O’Reilly	Kathryn Dagher	Carol and Ingrid are the wives of Mick O'Reilly (Peter Whitford), they arrive at the diner to expose his bigamy during his engagement to Irene Roberts (Lynne McGranger), which Irene promptly calls off.
10 July 1995–24 May 2000	Constable Len Turner	Christopher Maxfield	Len is a local police constable. He arrives to arrest Alf Stewart (Ray Meagher) for assaulting Donald Fisher (Norman Coburn). He arrests Shannon Reed (Isla Fisher) for underage drinking. He also stakes out Donald. Len arrests Aaron Welles (Ritchie Gudgeon) for possession of drugs and Tiegan Brook (Sally Marrett) for shoplifting. He also questions Justine Welles' (Bree Desborough) drug dealer boyfriend Danny Mackson (Nathan Kaye)
20 July–11 August	Murdoch "Mud" Roberts	Tom Richards	Mud is Irene Roberts' (Lynne McGranger) estranged husband. He meets Irene when his car breaks down. She resents him for walking out on her ten years earlier, leaving her to raise their three children Nathan (David Dixon), Finlay (Tina Thomsen) and Damian (Matt Doran) alone. Mud tells Irene the reason he left was due to her alcoholism. After realising Mud is homeless, Irene lets him stay at the beach house with her and they reconcile. Mud begins sexually harassing Selina Cook (Tempany Deckert), Irene's foster daughter. He tries to get into bed with Selina one night when goes into room but is surprised to find Irene under the covers who orders him to leave. Following a bushfire caused by Jack Wilson (Daniel Amalm), Mud's body is discovered by Shannon Reed (Isla Fisher). Selina is a suspect but is cleared due to a bank receipt dated around the time of the murder. It is revealed Nathan paid his cellmate Brian "Dodge" Forbes (Kelly Dale) to kill Mud.
27–28 July	Raoul Irving	Lloyd Morris	Raoul offers Angel Parrish (Melissa George) some commercial modelling work. He tries to charm her with an expensive dress and a ride in his limousine. Raoul makes advances on Angel in the editing room but she rejects him, telling him she is married.
2 August 1995–10 April 1996	Harry Prendegast	Geoffrey Rees; Ben Gabriel	Harry is an old friend of Bert King (Peter Collingwood). The two reconnect after meeting when Bert's daughter, Pippa Ross (Debra Lawrence) finds him a retirement home. Harry arrives with Bert when they come to stay with Pippa. They accuse Jack Wilson (Daniel Amalm) of stealing Bert's wallet but apologise when their wallet is found in the back of a police car.
16–18 August	Heather	Sarah Monahan	Heather is fostered by Michael (Dennis Coard) and Pippa Ross (Debra Lawrence). She is an attention-seeker who tells conflicting stories about her parents. Heather tries to seduce Nelson McFarlane (Laurence Breuls) but he rebuffs her. In order to get Nelson's attention, Heather threatens to jump out of a window. Nelson stops her and she kisses him. Nelson's girlfriend Sally Fletcher (Kate Ritchie) finds out and is annoyed and refuses to believe Nelson's protests until Jack Wilson (Daniel Amalm) tells her. Heather insists that Nelson kissed her but Sally challenges her on her recent behaviour and calls her a liar. Heather then threatens to jump out of the window again, and Pippa is concerned, but when Nelson calls her bluff and exposes her attention seeking ways, she relents. Heather then leaves.
17–25 August	Rad	Rudi Baker	Rad arrives in Summer Bay on a Milk truck and befriends Jack Wilson (Daniel Amalm). He steals Donald Fisher's (Norman Coburn) wallet at the Surf Club and Jack is blamed for it. In spite of this, Jack continues hanging around with Rad who encourages him to rebel. Rad later helps Jack steal a car in order to visit Chloe Richards (Kristy Wright) in Western Australia. The boys crash the car and it overturns. Jack calls out for Rad's help but he takes off into the bush leaving Jack trapped.
31 August–1 September	Grant Gardner	Trent Bowater	Grant and Ryan lose their homes in the bushfire caused by Jack Wilson (Daniel Amalm) they begin targeting him and they fight him while on detention with Curtis Reed (Shane Ammann). They later crash Selina Cook's (Tempany Deckert) 17th birthday party and begin vandalising her property by pouring her perfume all over the floor and breaking a picture frame she received for her birthday after she tells them to leave.
31 August–1 September	Ryan	Anthony Macri	Grant and Ryan lose their homes in the bushfire caused by Jack Wilson (Daniel Amalm) they begin targeting him and they fight him while on detention with Curtis Reed (Shane Ammann). They later crash Selina Cook's (Tempany Deckert) 17th birthday party and begin vandalising her property by pouring her perfume all over the floor and breaking a picture frame she received for her birthday after she tells them to leave.
13 September 1995–6 August 1997	Mandy Thomas	Rachael Blake	Mandy is a professional novelist. Shannon Reed (Isla Fisher) invites her to stay at the Caravan Park. Shannon is inspired by Mandy's work and is clearly attracted to her. When Toni Jarvis (Bridie Carter), Mandy's editor and girlfriend arrives, Shannon is clearly jealous. However, Mandy dances with Shannon at Concert aboard a ferry to help victims of the recent bushfire. Mandy leaves but returns several months later when Shannon is having relationship problems with Alex Bennett (Nick Freedman). She and Alex become fast friends much to Shannon's jealousy. Donald Fisher (Norman Coburn) discovers Shannon and Mandy have unconsciously plagiarised each other's work and the press become involved. Shannon lies to save Mandy's reputation. The following year, Mandy returns looking for inspiration for her next book and finds herself in a love triangle with Shannon and Lachlan Fraser (Richard Grieve). Shannon chooses Mandy and they spend the night together before leaving for Paris.
14 September–13 October	Gail	Belinda Emmett	Gail is seen on a boat when Jack Wilson (Daniel Amalm) is looking for a venue to raise money for victimsof the bushfire that he started. He gets the help from Brian "Dodge" Forbes' (Kelly Dale) to get it and he does. Gail briefly date Travis Nash (Nic Testoni) but works out that he is more interested in Kelly Watson (Katrina Hobbs).
25 September–16 October	Lisa Matthews	Nana Coburn	Lisa is Brian "Dodge" Forbes' (Kelly Dale) girlfriend. She helps him frame Steven Matheson (Adam Willits) for theft of a computer from the school. Steven and Kelly Watson (Katrina Hobbs) chase Lisa and press her for Dodge's whereabouts when he fakes his own death. They follow Lisa but are unaware that Dodge is several steps ahead of them.
27–28 September	Toni Jarvis	Bridie Carter	Mandy Thomas' (Rachael Blake) editor and girlfriend. Her arrival causes Shannon Reed (Isla Fisher) to feel jealous.
1–2 November	Rachel Watson	Tasma Walton	Rachel is the younger sister of Kelly Watson (Katrina Hobbs). She blames Kelly when she is unable to save her boyfriend Rick (Andrew Rodereda) when he dies of his injuries following a car accident. After it is revealed that Rachel was behind the wheel, she admits she resents Kelly because their parents were always praising Kelly's achievements and ignoring Rachel. Before leaving, Kelly and Rachel manage to patch things up.
1 November	Rick	Andrew Rodereda	Rick is Rachel Watson's (Tasma Walton) boyfriend. He and Rachel are involved in a car accident and Rachel's sister, Kelly (Katrina Hobbs) battles to save him but Rick dies of his injuries.
1–3 November	Crash	Justin Hewitt	Crash is a member of a biker gang Alex Bennett (Nick Freedman) used to hang around with. When Alex refuses to take part in a rumble against some rival bikers from Yabbie Creek, Crash makes threats against him and his girlfriend Shannon Reed (Isla Fisher). Crash and Alex then agree to a race and the stipulation is If Alex wins, he leaves the gang, if Crash wins, Alex stays. The two begin racing and Crash gains the upper hand via cheating at first but Alex finds a shortcut and is able to win, much to Crash's ire.
7 November 1995–3 September 1996	Jeremy Riggs	David Stanley	Jeremy is a student in Year 11 obsessed with Selina Cook (Tempany Deckert). He steals her underwear from her bedroom and Curtis Reed (Shane Ammann) is blamed for it. Curtis catches him in the act but he begs him not to tell Selina. Jeremy later blackmails Selina after discovering her relationship with their teacher Steven Matheson (Adam Willits). Selina reluctantly agrees to pretend she is dating Jeremy in order to hide the truth. However, Selina discovers that Jeremy was her underwear thief after he seems to know where her bedroom is. Jeremy's father, Thomas (Jim Holt) sees through the relationship. After Jeremy fails his exam and lies about sleeping with Selina, she publicly humiliates him and as a result Jeremy tries to kill himself. He is rushed to hospital and later transfers schools. Jeremy reappears when Arthur Briggs (David Downer) calls him into the school to give evidence about Selina and Steven's relationship in an investigation.
16 November 1995–11 June 1996	Lindsay Simons	Kate Agnew	Lindsay is a nurse at Northern Districts Hospital and a colleague of Dr. Kelly Watson (Katrina Hobbs). She briefly dates Steven Matheson (Adam Willits). Lindsay tends to Alex Bennett (Nick Freedman), who is suffering from brain damage following a blast from an old grenade. Alex, unable to control his impulses, kisses Lindsay much to her shock and Steven rescues her. Lindsay insists that this kind of behaviour is not uncommon in brain damage patients.
28 November 1995–19 January 1996	Kathy Wilson	Christine Muscat	Kathy is Jack Wilson's (Daniel Amalm) sister. She arrives in Summer Bay to visit him and persuades him to return home over the Christmas holidays. It soon emerges that their mother Maria (Kim Antonios) has used Kathy in order to get Jack to return home in order to inherit some land.
29 November 1995–19 January 1996	Maria Wilson	Kim Antonios	Maria is Jack Wilson's (Daniel Amalm) mother. She arrives in Summer Bay and pleads with Jack to return home permanently after she tells him her boyfriend has been abusive. It soon becomes clear that Maria only wants Jack to return in order to inherit some land. She leaves after Jack opts to remain in the Bay.
30 November	Patient	Darren Stapleton	A patient of Kelly Watson (Katrina Hobbs). While treating him, Kelly pricks herself with a needle and worries when it is revealed the patient is HIV-positive.
30 November	Norma	Barbara Morton	A Clairvoyant who predicts Shane Parrish's (Dieter Brummer) accident when his wife Angel (Melissa George) visits her.
