= Jack Wilson (Home and Away) =

- Home and Away character
- Portrayed by: Daniel Amalm
- Duration: 1994–96, 2000
- First appearance: 1 April 1994
- Last appearance: 16 June 2000
- Introduced by: Andrew Howie (1994); John Holmes (2000)
In-universe information
- Occupation: Student (1994–96); Sailor (1996–)
- Mother: Maria Wilson
- Brothers: Jeremy Wilson
- Sisters: Kathy Wilson

Jack Wilson is a fictional character from the Australian Channel Seven soap opera Home and Away, played by Daniel Amalm. He made his first appearance on 1 April 1994. Jack was introduced as a new foster child for the characters of Michael (Dennis Coard) and Pippa Ross (Debra Lawrence). Amalm auditioned for the role in the place of his friend, who could not attend. Many actors auditioned to play Jack, but Amalm was eventually cast. Jack is characterised as a "bad boy" and a "wild child" and Amalm enjoyed playing the role of the "baddie". Jack's storylines feature racial abuse, rebellious behaviour, joy riding and various romances. In 1996, Amalm quit the series to concentrate on a music career. The actor did not like the monotony that accompanied playing the same role, but he remained open minded about a future return. He did so in 2000, when Jack returned as part of episodes centred on foster sister Sally Fletcher (Kate Ritchie) wedding.

Jack has received mainly positive reviews from critics. Ian Hyland from the Sunday Mirror branded Jack a "rebel rouser", while a reporter from The Gold Coast Bulletin called him a "dumb but streetwise kid". The Sun-Herald's Scott Ellis noted that Amalm's portrayal transformed Jack into one of Australia's "best-loved bad boys". Amalm was nominated for the "Most Popular New Talent" award at the 1995 Logie Awards.

== Creation and casting ==
On 1 January 1994, a reporter from TV Week announced that Amalm had joined the cast of Home and Away playing a new foster child of Michael (Dennis Coard) and Pippa Ross (Debra Lawrence). Amalm had a Japanese exchange student living with his family, an agent spotted the student Brazilian dancing in a club and took his details. The agent attempted to call the student back, but Amalm's father took the call. The student could not make the audition, so Amalm went in place of his place. Amalm was picked to play Jack from thousands of young actors, despite not being on the list to audition. Amalm was a busker with no acting experience, but he impressed producers so much with his performance that he was given the role of Jack. The actor told Alex Cramb of Inside Soap "I was given six pages of script at the original interview to learn. I did my best but my name wasn't even on the list when I went to the audition, so they didn't know I was doing it. I just sort of turned up, no-one knew me." Upon joining Home and Away, Amalm said that his co-star Dieter Brummer helped him to settle in properly.

Lisa Anthony writing for BIG! billed Jack as a "guitar strumming muso" who arrives to be fostered by Michael and Pippa. She reported that the industry had tipped Amalm to become "a huge star" thanks to the role. In addition the character was introduced to "feature in some massive storylines".

== Character development ==
Amalm told BIG! magazine's Anthony that he was not like Jack because he has respect for Melissa George and Laura Vasquez - unlike Jack who is "persistently trying to crack onto" their characters, Angel Parrish and Sarah Thompson. Dieter Brummer who plays Shane Parrish on the serial often said that Jack behaved very much like Shane did during his early years. He had a running joke with Amalm that the Home and Away writers were recycling Shane's scripts and using them for Jack.

Jack begins dating fellow "wild child" Selina Cook (Tempany Deckert). Deckert told Victoria Ross of Inside Soap that it comes as a "big surprise" for Selina when she realise's that she is attracted to Jack. Selina is "used to chasing anything in trousers" but finds herself falling in love. Deckert said that the fact Jack has not got any parents makes her "warm" to him, eventually seeing him as her "soul mate". Deckert and Amalm were "thrown together" by producers and the pair adjusted to their character's passionate scenes. She added they "just dive straight in and get on with it" and maintained a professional relationship.

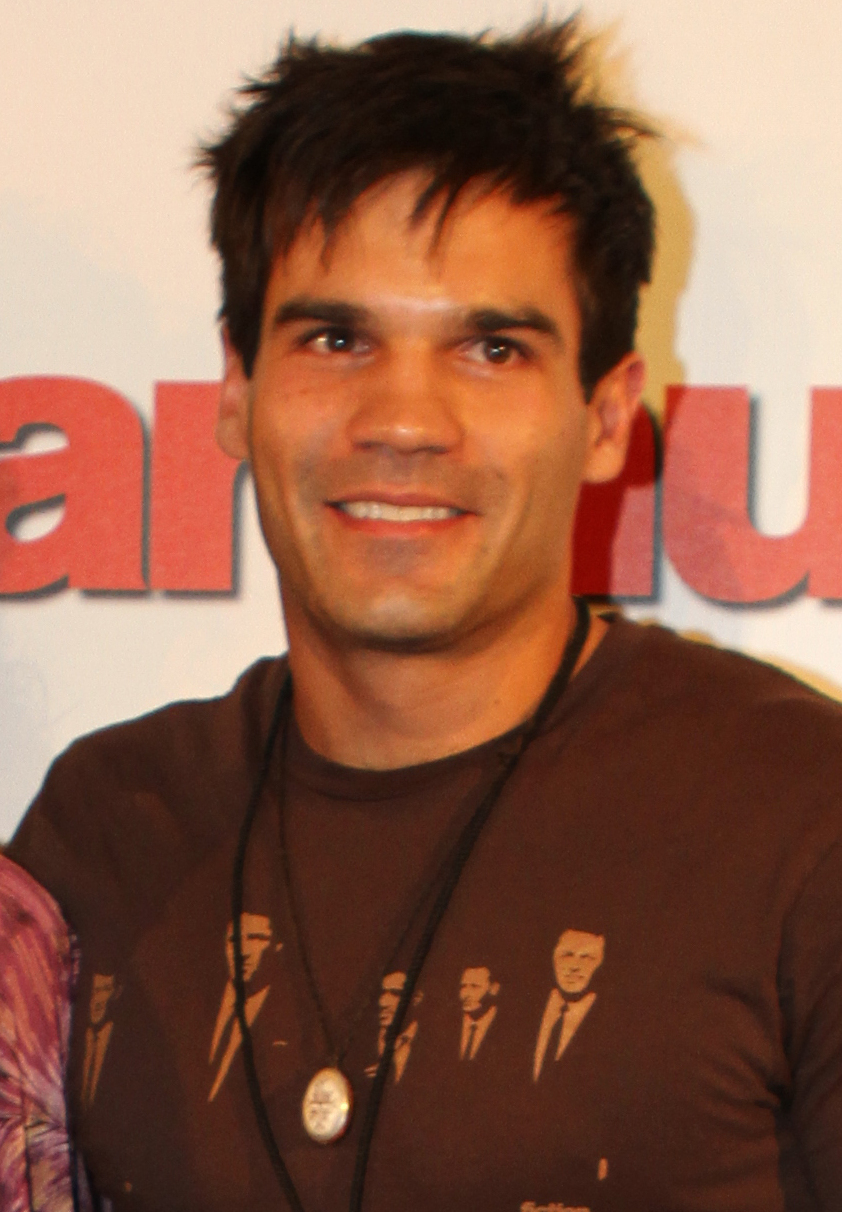
Daniel Amalm (pictured) quit Home and Away when playing Jack became too monotonous.

Jack and Curtis Reed (Shane Ammann) later befriend Eric Phillips (Daniel Goddard). Eric was introduced into the series on a six-week guest stint and is characterised as being manipulative and has muscles. Goddard told Inside Soap's Ross that his character "knows how to get people on side". When Jack and Curtis ask him to help them to get into shape, he reveals that he uses steroids. Goddard said that Eric "suggests that Jack try steroids to build up his muscles even more" and this turns the situation "sour".

In one storyline Jack is racially abused by Max (Rob Steele), the father of his girlfriend, Chloe Richards' (Kristy Wright). The abuse occurs because Jack's mother Maria (Kim Antonios) is Lebanese. Amalm said that he related to Jack's storyline because his parents were from ethnic backgrounds and he was mixed race. He added that his newfound fame elevated the abuse. Jack makes friends with Rad (Rudi Baker), a fellow rebellious character who leads Jack into joy riding. While taking a car on a ride, it crashes and bursts into flames. Amalm told Inside Soap's reporter that a stunt man took his place while filming the actual crash scenes. The stunt man safely flipped the car onto the roof while he was inside. After Amalm had to be "squeezed into a wrecked car that was upside down". Rad climbs out of the car and leaves Jack trapped inside. Nelson McFarlane (Laurence Breuls) manages to save Jack from the wreckage; but the fire spreads throughout Summer Bay. Amalm said that "Jack has some major sucking up to do to make amends for causing the fire!" Jack enlists the help of Shannon Reed (Isla Fisher) to arrange a charity concert to make up for his wrongdoing. Amalm said "thank goodness" for Jack that it all works out well in the end. Amalm opined it was easy to get bored of playing the same character, but was content to be portraying the "baddie" type role that Jack fills.

In 1996, Amalm left the serial to pursue other projects. Amalm told a reporter from Inside Soap that he was bored of doing monotonous work which was not "his thing". He added that it was too time consuming and wanted to concentrate more on his music. Amalm told Fiona Parker from the Daily Mirror that he was contracted for another year which he managed to get out of. In the build-up to his exit, Jack becomes "full circle" and starts acting wayward. Amalm said that Jack's final stories were his favourites because Jack returns to "being more of a rebel". The reporter added that Jack would leave "under the same dark cloud accompanied his arrival". Amalm said that he had no plans to return to the series, but would not rule out a return in the future. In 2000, Amalm returned to Home and Away; Jack featured in episodes centred on Sally Fletcher's (Kate Ritchie) wedding to Kieran Fletcher (Spencer McLaren).

== Storylines ==
Jack first arrives in Summer Bay to live with Pippa and Michael as their latest foster child. Jack is rude to his foster siblings and Michael at first but eventually settles after it transpires Jack's home life is chaotic due to his abusive new stepfather. Jack antagonises Shane by making a pass at his girlfriend, Angel. To teach Jack a lesson, Shane gives him false directions to Angel's bedroom. Jack climbs in through a window and attempts to crawl into bed with Angel only to find he has broken into the bedroom of local principal Donald Fisher (Norman Coburn), who Shane and Angel live with. Jack beats a hasty retreat.

Jack begins seeing Selina and begins cheating on her with Angel's sister, Frankie (Lenka Kripac) and Sonia Johnson (Eva Matiuk), who he had been seeing while she was with Tug O'Neale (Tristan Bancks). The girls realise Jack has been three-timing them and get revenge by luring him to a caravan under the pretext of a foursome, but stripping him to his boxers, leaving Jack humiliated. Jack begins dating new student Chloe but has to contend with her racist father, Max. Chloe eventually moves away. Jack decides to track her down and meets Rad, a petty criminal and they steal a car. They crash, causing the car to turn over and Rad runs off into the bush leaving Jack to his doom. Nelson hears Jack's cries for help and goes to assist. Jack is pulled free but a massive bushfire is caused, leaving Nelson with severe burns and causes a number of residents to lose their homes. Jack becomes a pariah and tries to make amends.

Jack soon falls for his foster sister Sally and the two become very close, but Michael is against the relationship and imposes sanctions on it. Eventually, the couple split. During a massive rainstorm, the town becomes flooded and Jack and Michael go to look for Sam Marshall (Ryan Clark) who is late home. Sam falls into a stream and Jack acts to save him, Michael then dives and Jack tries to save Michael but he is pulled away downstream by the strong current and drowns as a result. The family is left devastated and Jack and Sam blame themselves. After a visit from a careers officer to Summer Bay High, Jack decides to enlist in the navy and promptly leaves town after saying goodbye. Pippa attends his induction parade and takes a photo which remains on the mantle for many years.

Jack returns to Summer Bay on the eve of Sally's wedding to Kieran and stays at the Caravan Park with several other family members who have returned for the event. Jack reminisces about old times and the trouble he caused Michael and Pippa. He also mentions he has found religion while in the navy. After the wedding is cancelled due to Kieran's infidelity, Jack and the family console a distraught Sally. Before Jack leaves he has a flashback to the night of Michael's death and tells Pippa he tried holding onto Michael and she consoles him with a hug.

== Reception ==
For his portrayal of Jack, Amalm received a nomination for "Most Popular New Talent" at the 1995 Logie Awards. British broadcaster ITV cut scenes of Jack being locked in the boot of a car as a joke from episodes. While acceptable to air in Australia, the scenes were deemed too explicit for British audiences. Sue Williams of the Sun Herald said that Amalm was Home and Away's "young male heart-throb." While a columnist from The Courier-Mail branded Jack as a "troubled teen". Ian Hyland from the Sunday Mirror said that Jack was the serial's "rebel rouser". Debra Lawrence told a TV Week journalist that Jack was one of her favourite characters from Home and Away. She opined that Amalm's work was "amazing." A columnist for Inside Soap said that Jack was an "easily-led sulky trouble-maker about to join the navy". While their colleague said that Jack's life seemed to be coming together after his mother was introduced. They opined that Jack acted "cocky" about the situation. As "nothing has ever been simple in Jack's life"; it did not work out for the best. They were unsure if "poor Jack" would ever trust anyone again and said that knowing Jack, "he'll lash out at the people closest to him". A reporter from The Gold Coast Bulletin said that "Jack Wilson was the dumb but streetwise kid who breezed into Summer Bay in 1994 and propelled actor Daniel Amalm to pin-up status." Scott Ellis of The Sun-Herald said that Amalm made Jack one of Australia's "best-loved bad boys". The episode featuring the Summer Bay bushfire caused by Jack was nominated for the Avid Technology Award for "Best Episode in a Television Drama Serial" at the 1996 Australian Film Institute Awards.
