= Chloe Richards =

Fictional character from Home and Away

- Home and Away character
- Portrayed by: Kristy Wright
- Duration: 1995–1999, 2005
- First appearance: 28 June 1995
- Last appearance: 7 October 2005
- Introduced by: John Holmes (1995); Julie McGuaran (2005)
In-universe information
- Occupation: Student
- Father: Max Richards
- Mother: Maureen Richards
- Husband: James Fraser (1999–2000)
- Daughters: Olivia Fraser

Chloe Richards (also Fraser) is a fictional character from the Australian television soap opera Home and Away, played by Kristy Wright. She debuted on-screen during the episode airing on 28 June 1995. Chloe left in 1999, making a short return stint in 2005 when she died from the resulting injuries of a car crash. Chloe has relationships with Jack Wilson, Curtis Reed, Lachlan Fraser, James Fraser and Jesse McGregor.

== Casting and character development ==
Wright was asked to join the regular cast of Home and Away as Chloe, after initially appearing as a background extra in the series.

Several months into her role as Chloe, Wright began to find her fame hard to deal with at first. Of an encounter with a group of teenagers who began harassing her at a local mall, she said "So I just steer clear of places where young people hang out - shopping centres, McDonald's, cinema strips... Going out for dinner's fine but I haven't been shopping for a long time."

In one storyline Chloe discovers that she is pregnant. Wright said "I'm really looking forward to being heavily pregnant, I've been trying on some 'stomachs' in the wardrobe department. It's so much fun."

== Storylines ==
Chloe is first seen when she works on a school project with Jack Wilson (Daniel Amalm). They begin a relationship but Chloe's racist father Max (Rob Steele) takes an instant dislike to Jack, due to him being mixed race. When Max begins being physically abusive towards Chloe, she flees to Western Australia to stay with her estranged mother, Maureen (Liz Burch). After Maureen rejects her, Chloe returns to Summer Bay and is devastated when she finds out Max has left and Jack is dating his foster sister Sally Fletcher (Kate Ritchie). Irene Roberts (Lynne McGranger) takes Chloe in and fosters her. Chloe leaves again, this time to search for Max. When she returns, it is apparent that she is hooked on drugs, but keeps it a secret. When the police raid Summer Bay High, Chloe implicates her dealer, school secretary Joanne Brennan (Kimberley Joseph). Chloe is then forced to repeat Year 11 and is deeply unhappy about this but she reconciles her relationship with Curtis Reed (Shane Ammann), who had battled alcoholism the previous year. Donald Fisher (Norman Coburn), Chloe's principal is impressed with the progress she is making but views Curtis as detriment to her studies. Upon learning that she could top the State HSC History results, Chloe applies for a scholarship but is rejected by the university when her drug past is revealed. Chloe and Irene blame Fisher for the revelation but he maintains he told the truth to give Chloe an honest start.

At an end of term HSC party, Chloe is raped while walking along the beach. The trauma effects her greatly causing her to cut her hair shorter and have nightmares about shooting Curtis. Alex Bennett (Nick Freedman) finds Chloe's shoe on the beach and is later arrested as a suspect, However, he is later released due to lack of evidence. Colin Parker, a man matching the description of the rapist, is brought to trial but Chloe fails to recognise him in the courtroom and he is freed but shot dead by an angry Max. Chloe and Curtis split amicably after several months and Chloe begins receiving counselling from Brad Cooper (Bruce Samazan). Chloe falls for Brad and they go away for Christmas but Brad's true colours are revealed and Chloe, upon realising he is her rapist, tries to flee. Brad hotly pursues her but catches his leg in a dog trap, which he had used to stop Chloe from escaping. Badly hurt and now powerless, Brad begs Chloe to help him while trying to claim that he does love her, but Chloe calls him out for his actions of raping her and being responsible for her father's imprisonment, adding further that Max should've shot him instead of Colin, and denounces him as a sick man before walking away, leaving Brad trapped and unable to get out of his own trap. Chloe rolls up the window of the car and hides until morning, where Constable Terri Garner (Alyson Standen) and Travis Nash (Nic Testoni) arrive on the scene to rescue her, while Brad is arrested and transferred to a psychiatric hospital after having his leg amputated due to severe blood loss. Chloe is finally able to put the ordeal behind her.

When Chloe kisses Jesse McGregor (Ben Unwin), her foster sister, Selina Roberts' (Tempany Deckert) boyfriend, it causes tension between the girls in the house. Jesse and Chloe have a brief dalliance which does not last as Jesse still loves Selina. Chloe then has a one-night stand with doctor Lachlan Fraser (Richard Grieve) and becomes pregnant with his child. Most Summer Bay residents assume Jesse is the father but Selina figures out Lachlan is. Lachlan develops feelings for Chloe but Lachlan's mother Diana (Kerry McGuire) is horrified when she learns about Chloe's pregnancy and threatens to reveal her drug past unless she stays away from Lachlan. Irene records a conversation between Chloe and Diana and plays it to Lachlan, who orders Diana to leave their lives.

Chloe and Lachlan become a couple and move into a flat together. Before the birth Chloe experiences several false alarms and goes into labour while walking on the beach. Chloe gives birth to a daughter, Olivia. Several weeks later, Lachlan is diagnosed with a brain tumour and undergoes surgery but the procedure leaves him comatose for several days. When Lachlan regains consciousness he is left unable to move or communicate properly. Chloe offers to look after him at home but finds herself at odds with Diana when she returns and they argue over Lachlan's care. In the end, Lachlan agrees to undergo treatment in America which Diana funds and leaves Chloe devastated.

After deciding to surprise Lachlan in the States by taking Olivia with her to visit him for Thanksgiving, Chloe is devastated when she learns that Lachlan has moved on with a new partner. Lachlan's brother James (Michael Piccirilli) comes to support Chloe and Olivia during this difficult time, and they soon become romantically involved. They later marry but face numerous problems, particularly when Lachlan dies of a second hemorrhage. Chloe leaves the Bay after realising she does not love James like she loves Lachlan. Chloe and James agree to remain friends and she later sends him a card on his birthday.

Chloe and Olivia return in June 2005 to stay with Irene in order to escape her abusive boyfriend Troy Peters (Christian Willis). She reveals she is now a lawyer and tells Irene that she met Troy while living in the city and he is a colleague at the law firm. Chloe seeks comfort in Jesse but Troy eventually arrives in town and begins terrorising her and attacks Jesse. When Alf Stewart (Ray Meagher) celebrates his 60th birthday, Chloe attends the party at Summer Bay House and enjoys herself. Jesse asks her out but she rejects him and apologises for misleading him. Jesse, crushed, leaves the party early. Troy arrives claiming he has been released on bail and Chloe refuses to talk to him. Will Smith (Zac Drayson) and Flynn Saunders (Joel McIlroy) physically remove Troy who tells Chloe that if he cannot have her no-one will. At the end of the night, Chloe drives home along with Alf, Ric Dalby (Mark Furze), Martha MacKenzie (Jodi Gordon) and Kim Hyde (Chris Hemsworth). The car is hit by an oncoming driver on the wrong side of the road. Ric and Alf battle to save Martha and Kim. Chloe is seemingly fine with only a broken arm. At the hospital, Chloe suggests someone deliberately ran them off the road and Alf agrees. She also blames herself for the accident and Martha's injuries as she was driving. Alf reassures her that is not the case and blames himself for moving Martha.

Chloe is scheduled to have an operation to repair the damage on her arm the following morning, but suffers an embolism and dies with Irene by her side. Following Chloe's death, Alf's son Duncan (Brendan McKensy) is in the frame for the accident but is later cleared. It is soon revealed Jesse is the culprit as he had been drinking after he left he party. Jesse confesses and is arrested. Irene and Diana battle for custody of Olivia but due to a prior conviction, Irene is ineligible. Just as it appears Diana has won, James returns and reveals that Chloe's will stipulates that he is to receive custody of Olivia upon her death and takes his niece to live with him in England. Chloe later appears to Irene as a vision when she begins suffering delusions after being poisoned by Corey Henderson (Adam Saunders).

== Reception ==
Robin Oliver of The Sydney Morning Herald praised scriptwriter Boaz Stark for handling the aftermath of Chloe's rape and Wright and McGranger's performances. Actress Terasa Livingstone praised Wright's performance during Chloe's labour scenes, stating she thought Wright handled it well.

The episode involving Chloe's confrontation with her rapist Brad Cooper received the Australian Writers' Guild award for "Best Episode in a Television Serial" in 1997 and was presented to the episode's writer Greg Haddrick.

For her portrayal of Chloe, Wright was nominated for Best actress at the 1998 Logie Awards and was nominated the following year for "Sexiest Female" at The Inside Soap Awards.
