= Shannon Reed =

Fictional character from the Australian soap opera Home and Away

- Home and Away character
- Portrayed by: Isla Fisher; Ashley Murray (flashback)
- Duration: 1994–1997
- First appearance: 16 September 1994
- Last appearance: 6 August 1997
- Introduced by: Andrew Howie
In-universe information
- Occupation: Student; Author
- Mother: Katherine Walker
- Adoptive mother: Elizabeth Reed
- Brothers: Curtis Reed (adoptive)

Shannon Reed is a fictional character from the Australian soap opera Home and Away, played by Isla Fisher. She made her first on screen appearance on 16 September 1994. She departed on 6 August 1997. Ashley Murray played a young Shannon in flashbacks.

== Casting ==
Actress Isla Fisher was eighteen when she joined the cast of Home and Away in 1994, shortly after finishing the role of Robyn Devereaux on Paradise Beach. Fisher was cast alongside Shane Ammann in the respective roles of Shannon and Curtis Reed.

In an interview with Rachel Browne of The Sun-Herald, Fisher spoke of her success and experiences on the show. "I would be stupid to let it go to my head because it could all end tomorrow and I would just fade back into obscurity." She added: "I like working on Home And Away but it's a heavy workload so I get stressed out a lot, We work about 15 hours a day, including the time it takes to learn lines. "I know a lot of people work those sort of hours but I think we really feel it because most of us are young and fairly inexperienced. I don't have a life, really. What you see on the screen is what I do. But I am very grateful because it is good experience. It's like an apprenticeship but we do it in front of 20 million people so all our mistakes are up for the world to see."

== Development ==
=== Anorexia ===
Shannon loses confidence in herself when Shane Parrish (Dieter Brummer) rejects her romantic advances. She begins starving herself and develops anorexia. Shannon manages to convince everyone that she is fine, and although she skips family meals, it takes her guardian Pippa Ross (Debra Lawrance) a long time to realise something is wrong. Shannon faints and almost drowns while she is out swimming one day. After she is rescued, her friends and family rush her to the hospital for treatment, and she begins a long recovery process.

=== Katherine Walker ===
Producers explored the character's background further with the introduction of her biological mother, politician Katherine Walker (Linden Wilkinson) in 1996. The storyline begins with Shannon deciding to find her mother, against Pippa's advice. The state's fostering department arrange a meeting between Shannon and her mother, who does not show up. Instead, Katherine watches Shannon from afar, as she cannot gather the courage to speak to her. An Inside Soap writer explained that Shannon was fostered by Elizabeth Reed when she was 12 years old. Elizabeth eventually adopted Shannon and her foster brother Curtis. Elizabeth was later killed in a car accident. The writer thought that Shannon did not need rejection from her mother in addition to her recent "teenage problems". Katherine feels that with her growing political career, she does not want a scandal, but she returns to Summer Bay as she wants to see how Shannon has turned out. At the same time, Shannon is tasked with interviewing Katherine. She is unaware of their connection, until she recognises a ring Katherine is wearing from her childhood memories of her mother. Katherine appears to want to get to know her daughter, but Shannon soon realises that she is just using their connection to improve her political ambitions.

=== Sexuality ===
Shannon is bisexual. In her final storyline it is implied that she moves away with a female partner, but that is never directly stated. Shannon has several romantic relationships with male characters during her time in the show, but formed a close relationship with Mandy Thomas (Rachael Blake), an author who inspires her to pursue a career in writing. Her friendship with Mandy, an older lesbian, leaves Shannon questioning her own sexuality.

=== Departure ===
Fisher chose to leave the serial in June 1997. She admitted that she was sad to leave the show, but she wanted to go and do other things. Fisher moved to London after leaving Australia, before moving to Paris, where she was to attend the L'École Internationale de Théâtre Jacques Lecoq, a theatre and arts training school. Her character's final storyline saw her choose between her partner Lachlan Fraser (Richard Grieve) or Mandy, who has recently returned to the Bay. Fisher did not think Shannon and Lachie's relationship was working out, and Mandy's arrival had made her realise how much she had missed her. She commented, "And although she loves Lachie as a friend, it's not to the degree that she loves Mandy." Shannon opts to leave the Bay for Paris, leaving Lachie behind. Steven Murphy and Simon Timblick of Inside Soap branded her exit at the time as "the most controversial departure in the show's history". However, Fisher was happy with it and glad her character was shown doing what makes her happy. She added, "Love is love – it doesn't matter if it's between a boy and a boy, a girl and a girl or a girl and a boy."

== Storylines ==
Shannon and Curtis arrive in Summer Bay to be fostered by Michael (Dennis Coard) and Pippa Ross. The Rosses only have room for one of them, so Alf (Ray Meagher) and Ailsa Stewart (Judy Nunn) foster Curtis. When Shannon and Curtis are caught kissing by Alf, it causes controversy, but the fuss dies down when they reveal they are foster siblings. Shannon clashes with Selina Cook (Tempany Deckert) who takes an interest in Curtis but they soon become best friends. Shannon and Curtis split up and she dates Eric Phillips (Daniel Goddard), who is revealed to be a drug dealer. Damian Roberts (Matt Doran) and Jack Wilson (Daniel Amalm) warn Shannon but she will not listen and tells them to keep out of her business. Shannon later breaks up with Eric after he gets heavy with her. She then experiences recurring nightmares of sexual abuse at the hands of her Uncle Tim and confides in teacher and counsellor Donna Bishop (Nicola Quilter).

Shannon begins babysitting Angel Parrish's (Melissa George) son, Dylan (Corey Glaister) and forms an attraction to Angel's husband, Shane. She tries to seduce Shane but he rejects her. When Angel confronts Shannon, she lies and tells Angel she and Shane have been sleeping together, which Angel believes and promptly leaves Shane, taking Dylan with her. Angel and Dylan are involved in seaplane crash which leaves them stranded in the bush for several days but they are found and reunited with Shane. Angel refuses to forgive Shannon and her guilt spirals into anorexia, causing her to nearly drown when she passes out during a swim one day. Angel dives in to save her but is still frosty towards her. At Pippa and Michael's insistence, Shannon seeks help for her condition. After recovering, Shannon takes an interest in writing but things are still no better with Angel, who accuses her of stalking her. The culprit is revealed to be Angel's ex-boyfriend, Paul Harris (Ramsay Everingham), Dylan's biological father. Shannon saves Angel and Dylan when Paul attacks and Angel finally forgives her.

Shannon invites author Mandy Thomas to stay in Summer Bay. Shannon admires Mandy and they begin spending a lot of time together. Shannon's crush on Mandy becomes apparent and when Mandy's editor and former lover Toni Jarvis (Bridie Carter) arrives she is extremely put out and begins avoiding Mandy altogether. However, Shannon and Mandy reconcile at a Benefit cruise to raise money for victims of the recent bush fire. Pippa and Selina become concerned when Shannon and Mandy openly dance with each other and Selina's comments do little to impress Shannon. Mandy leaves after reading a love story Shannon wrote with the characters based on her and Shannon.

Shannon is devastated by Mandy's sudden departure but enters a relationship with local artist Alex Bennett (Nick Freedman) who saves her, Selina and Damian from a gang of youths. Their relationship is met with disapproval from Michael once he learns Shannon plans to pose nude for one of Alex's paintings. When Alex rescues Selina from his father, Saul Bennett's (David Ritchie) commune, Shannon becomes momentarily worried Selina may have a crush on Alex. Mandy returns telling her that she wants to dedicate her next book to her and Alex is jealous of their closeness, however he develops a friendship with Mandy. After Donald Fisher (Norman Coburn) discovers that Shannon and Mandy have unconsciously plagiarised each other, Shannon forfeits an award in order to save Mandy's career.

Shannon discovers that her real mother, Katherine Walker, is a ruthless politician and their relationship is very antagonistic. Alex soon leaves for Paris and Shannon begins dating Mandy's brother, Geoff (Martin Henderson), a sailor on shore leave. She and Geoff know they only have a short time so they put on a play showing how they would live their life in a day. After completing her HSC, Shannon enrolls at University and decides on an image change by dyeing her hair black and dating Kye Lyons (Ian Bliss) and moves in with him. She soon realises Kye is violent and dumps him. Kye then follows her to Summer Bay house and gets violent and he hits Pippa, leaving her comatose. Shannon then blames herself, Pippa recovers but is left with temporary memory loss.

Lachlan Fraser, the new local doctor takes an interest in Shannon and they become a couple. He takes her to have lunch with his dysfunctional family, most of whom are doctors and they witness his parents Peter (Helmut Bakaitis) and Diana (Kerry McGuire) arguing. After a brief spell of living together, Shannon and Lachie cool things down but Lachie soon proposes. Mandy returns once more and asks Shannon to join her in Paris. After much soul searching, Shannon decides her future is with Mandy and shares emotional goodbyes with Pippa, Lachie and Selina.

== Reception ==
For her portrayal of Shannon, Fisher received a nomination for the Logie Award for Most Popular New Talent in 1995. In 1997, she earned a nomination for Most Popular Actress. Nina Myskow of the Daily Mirror branded Shannon "feisty".

In November 2021, three critics for The West Australian placed Shannon at number 13 in their feature on the "Top 50 heroes we love and villains we hate" from Home and Away. They praised the character, stating: "Shannon was an impressively progressive character for the 90s. An aspiring writer, she battled anorexia and later fell for an older female writer who, it was implied, she left Summer Bay to be with."
