= Angel Parrish =

- Home and Away character
- Portrayed by: Melissa George
- Duration: 1993–1996
- First appearance: 30 March 1993 (Episode 1202)
- Last appearance: 30 August 1996 (Episode 2000)
- Introduced by: Andrew Howie
In-universe information
- Occupation: Student; Waitress
- Father: Raymond Brooks
- Mother: Sarah Brooks
- Sisters: Frankie Brooks
- Husband: Shane Parrish (1995–1996); Simon Broadhurst (1998–?)
- Sons: Dylan Parrish
- Daughters: Shane Parrish Jr

Angel Parrish (also Brooks) is a fictional character from the Australian soap opera Home and Away, portrayed by Melissa George. She made her first on-screen appearance on 30 March 1993, arriving as a teenage runaway. The character became popular amongst viewers when she was paired up with Shane Parrish, and to this day they remain one of the soap's most loved couples. George departed Home and Away on 30 August 1996. Angel said goodbye to Summer Bay and left for England with her children and new boyfriend.

== Casting ==
George and a friend, Cara Mitchinson, both acted in a mock episode of Home and Away with a video camera, playing Bobby and Sophie Simpson respectively. When the offer of a role on the serial came, George's parents convinced her to relocate from her native Perth to Sydney and she began lodging with families. George met with casting director Liz Mullinar and was subsequently cast in the role.

== Storylines ==
Angel arrives in Summer Bay having run away from home. At first, she makes a bad impression on the town, selling fake Frente! concert tickets to Shane Parrish (Dieter Brummer). She eventually pays him back after he persistently harasses her. After living rough on the streets, Angel develops an infection and is hospitalized as a result. Shane's friend Damian Roberts (Matt Doran) feels sorry for her and tries to persuade his foster mother Pippa Ross (Debra Lawrance) to take her in; however, Pippa cannot, as there is no room at Summer Bay House. Local Principal Donald Fisher (Norman Coburn) lets Angel stay with him, despite the fact Shane, whom she had previously ripped off, is also living there. Angel and Shane constantly bicker but end up kissing one afternoon.

Once they admit their feelings for each other, Angel and Shane put their differences aside and begin a relationship. At first, the two decide to keep their romance a secret from Fisher, but the truth is revealed when he catches them kissing. Angel settles into the Bay and befriends Sarah Thompson (Laura Vasquez). When Shane does work experience at Yabbie Creek police station where his older brother Nick (Bruce Roberts) works, he finds Angel's file on the computer and it is revealed that Angel gave birth to a son at 14 and surrendered custody to the child's father and grandmother. This drives a wedge between Shane and Angel for a time but with Nick's intervention, Shane agrees to help Angel make contact with her son by visiting him. After a shaky start, Shane begins to bond with Dylan and later proposes to Angel, which she accepts.

Several months before the wedding, Angel is hit by Alf Stewart's (Ray Meagher) car while crossing the road and is paralysed, leaving her to use a wheelchair for a while. Angel tries to force herself to walk after several weeks but ultimately fails when she falls while trying to get out of bed. She is devastated at the thought she may not be able to walk down the aisle. Shane suggests postponing the wedding but Angel is determined to go ahead and manages to hobble down the aisle with Fisher supporting her. The couple takes their vows and become husband and wife. Shortly after the wedding, Angel and Shane battle Paul Harris (Ramsay Everingham), Angel's ex-boyfriend and Dylan's father, for custody and ultimately win after Paul withdraws after excessive intervention from his mother Anne (Fay Kelton).

For a while, married life seems smooth for Angel and Shane, but problems occur when their friend Shannon Reed (Isla Fisher), who begins babysitting Dylan, makes a pass at Shane and tries to steal him from Angel. When Shane rejects her, Shannon publicly lies, saying they had been having an affair, which Angel is led to believe. Furious, Angel walks out on Shane, taking Dylan with her, and boards a seaplane. The plane crashes and Angel, Dylan, and schoolteacher Teresa Lynch (Diane Craig) are missing for some time before they are rescued. After Shannon admits the truth, Angel and Shane reunite and she apologises for not trusting him. Their friendship with Shannon remains strained until Paul wages a scare campaign against Angel and tries to kidnap Dylan when Shannon saves the day and is forgiven.

Dylan is later diagnosed with leukaemia. Desperate, Angel contemplates having another child with Paul in order to provide a bone marrow donor for him. The plan is scrapped when Angel discovers she is pregnant with Shane's baby. After extensive chemotherapy, Dylan recovers and with the new baby on the way, things look bright for the Parrish family. At Christmas, Shane is knocked off his motorbike and left injured. After having his spleen removed, he appears to be healing well but heartbreak soon follows when Angel and Shane decide to go for a romantic picnic at the Bay's Headland to celebrate their first wedding anniversary. Shane complains he feels unwell and collapses. A distraught Angel tries to help him, along with passing tourists. Shane is rushed to the hospital but dies from sepsis caused by a small cut on his hand.

Angel is unable to cope with Shane's death at first. A month later she goes into labour during a large storm which causes flooding in the Bay. With the bridge washed away, Angel is unable to get to the hospital. Shannon and her boyfriend, Alex Bennett (Nick Freedman) attempt to get Angel to Summer Bay house by road and are stuck until an unidentified biker guides them through the bush. They arrive at the house and Pippa is on hand to help deliver Angel's daughter, who she names Shane after her father. Angel is convinced that the biker was Shane's spirit and finally finds comfort in his death. Angel and Pippa forge a strong bond as Pippa's husband Michael (Dennis Coard) died in the flood after being swept downstream trying to save Sam Marshall (Ryan Clark).

Simon Broadhurst (Julian Garner), a rich Englishman, arrives in Summer Bay and begins to investigate who knocked Shane off his bike. It is soon revealed that Sgt. Chris Hale (John Meillon Jr.), who had supported Angel in the aftermath of Shane's death, is the person responsible. Angel is thankful for Simon's help in the case and he falls for her but she makes it clear she is not ready for a relationship as it is too soon after Shane's death. Simon leaves for England. Summer Bay is hit by a big earthquake and Angel's house is destroyed in the impact. Angel is devastated, as she has lost the home that she had set up with Shane after moving out of Fisher's. The incident leaves her questioning whether she should stay in the Bay.

Simon returns and Angel decides life is too short and confesses her love for him. They then decide to leave for England. After saying goodbye to her friends, Angel visits Shane's grave one last time and bids an emotional farewell to Summer Bay, before driving off with Simon, Dylan and baby Shane for a new life in England.

== Reception ==
For her portrayal of Angel, George won the "Most Popular New Talent" Logie Award in 1994. She was also nominated for "Most Popular Actress". The following year George won the "Most Popular Actress" award and in 1996 she was nominated for the Gold Logie. 1997 saw George nominated for "Most Popular Actress" once again. Discussing Angel and Shane's wedding, a reporter from Soap World wrote "The Summer Bay spectacular is one of TV's top weddings, but it wasn't to last... sob!" A critic for The Daily Telegraph praised George for her performance when they observed how quickly Simon was trying to "move in on Angel" following Shane's death, stating "Fortunately, Angel gives him the flick, in an inspired piece of acting which proves Melissa truly has the grieving widow part down pat." In 1998, writers from Inside Soap published an article about the top ten characters they wanted to return to soap. Angel was featured and they described her as "a willowy teenager who went from rock band groupie to disaster-prone single mum then to widow in the space of three years."
