= Donna Bishop =

- Home and Away character
- Portrayed by: Nicola Quilter
- Duration: 1994–1995
- First appearance: 8 November 1994
- Last appearance: 23 June 1995
- Introduced by: John Holmes
In-universe information
- Occupation: Teacher; School Counsellor
- Father: Charles Bishop
- Brothers: Gus Bishop

Donna Bishop is a fictional character from the Australian Channel Seven soap opera Home and Away, played by Nicola Quilter. She debuted on-screen during the episode airing on 8 November 1994 and departed on 23 June 1995.

== Casting ==
Quilter joined the cast in 1994. Actress Kimberley Joseph also auditioned for the part of Donna, but it was Quilter who secured the role. Quilter starred in the series for nine months, but she felt that the role had distracted her from a music career.

While working on Home and Away Quilter was stalked by a viewer who became "sexually obsessed" with her. He found out her filming schedule and repeatedly phoned her when she finished filming. He tricked her into believing it was someone close to her, but when she changed her telephone number the harassment stopped.

== Character development ==
In December 1994, Quilter fractured a bone in her foot when a wall-mounted bed fell onto it. She was given crutches to aid her mobility while it healed. Rachel Browne from The Sun-Herald reported that Quilter's accident had "thrown production schedules into disarray" because the scripts required Donna to be using her feet.

Donna became central to a storyline highlighting domestic abuse. When Donna was introduced into the series she was given a backstory of her being the victim of violence inflicted by boyfriend Andrew Warren (Adrian Lee). Andrew was introduced into the series and Donna decides to give their relationship another go. Lee told Victoria Ross from Inside Soap that Donna is "in big trouble" being with Andrew again. He explained that men like Andrew have something that "makes them flip" and for his character, jealousy brings on his violence. "When he sees Donna with another man he just lashes out". After Andrew witnesses Donna flirting with Rob Storey (Matthew Lilley) and Travis Nash (Nic Testoni) he hits her and Donna is left with a black eye. Lee said that he had researched the issue by looking at associated text and women who had been the victims of domestic violence. He was also "impressed" with Home and Away for choosing to portray the Donna and Andrew's story. The actor felt "edgy" about playing issue-led storylines, but he was more inclined to portray this storyline as he felt it was important that the story behind the abuse was told.

== Storylines ==
Donna returns to Summer Bay, having previously grown up in the area and attended school. She reconnects with former lover Rob and takes a job alongside him at their former high school. Donna is friendly toward Rob but backs off when she learns his girlfriend Roxanne Miller (Lisa Lackey) is suffering from breast cancer. Donna moves in with Michael (Dennis Coard) and Pippa Ross (Debra Lawrence) and their foster children at Summer Bay House. One day while she is taking a shower, Jack Wilson (Daniel Amalm) walks in on Donna much to her embarrassment. She is further embarrassed when Jack brags to his friends at school. As way of an apology, Jack shows Donna how to lock the door but Michael catches them in the bathroom together and demands an explanation.

Donna comforts Rob when Roxy leaves town and it looks like they may reconcile but Andrew's arrival unnerves her. It emerges that Andrew is Donna's ex-boyfriend and used to beat her. When Donna slaps Andrew during an argument, she is left feeling ashamed, thinking she is no better than him. She apologises and softens towards him. When Donna and Andrew reconcile, Rob is horrified. They seem happy until Andrew's jealousy overwhelms him when Donna begins spending time with Rob and their old friend Travis. This culminates in Andrew hitting her. Donna leaves him and later returns to collect her things but is unexpectedly attacked by Andrew. Rob arrives on the scene and rescues Donna. Andrew is arrested and leaves the Bay after resigning from his teaching position.

Donna then moves in with Travis and they become a couple. Her brother Gus (Samuel Johnson) arrives to stay with her and causes trouble for numerous bay residents. When Gus' relationship with Sally Fletcher (Kate Ritchie) fails, he plans to run away and taunts Donna that her inability to control him will make their parents no longer see Donna as the perfect daughter. Their father, Charles (David Baldwyn) arrives and tells Gus off about disappearing. Donna reaches her limit with Gus and threatens to report him to the police for his various acts of vandalism. Gus is then sent home. Donna then resigns from the school and decides to go on a whale-watching tour with Travis. They leave for Canada but Travis returns alone several months later, revealing that they have broken up and Donna is now with someone else.

== Reception ==
The episode featuring the climax of Donna's domestic abuse at the hands of Andrew was nominated for "Best Episode in a Television Drama Serial" at the Australian Film Institute Awards in 1995.
