= Curtis Reed (Home and Away) =

Fictional character from the Australian soap opera Home and Away

- Home and Away character
- Portrayed by: Shane Ammann
- Duration: 1994–1997
- First appearance: 16 September 1994
- Last appearance: 15 April 1997
- Introduced by: Andrew Howie
In-universe information
- Occupation: Student; Surfer
- Adoptive mother: Elizabeth Reed
- Sisters: Shannon Reed (adoptive)

Curtis Reed is a fictional character from the Australian soap opera Home and Away, played by Shane Ammann. He made his first appearance during the episode broadcast on 16 September 1994. He was introduced alongside his adopted sister, Shannon Reed (Isla Fisher). He departed on 15 April 1997.

== Casting ==
Ammann joined the cast of Home and Away as Curtis in mid-1994, along with Isla Fisher who was cast as Shannon Reed, shortly after they finished up on Paradise Beach. Their casting was publicised in TV Week a few days before their debuts. Di Stanley reported that they had only starred in one scene together during Paradise Beach, so the interview was a chance for them to get to know each other. She said the most surprising revelation was the age difference between the actors – Ammann was 14 and Fisher was 18. Ammann made his debut on 16 September 1994.

== Development ==
Curtis and Shannon were introduced as siblings, whose mother had been killed in a car accident three months prior. They come to Summer Bay, as it is the only place with foster homes for them both. Shannon moves in with the Ross family and Curtis moves in Alf Stewart (Ray Meagher) and Ailsa Stewart (Judy Nunn). However, it soon emerges that the pair are not actually siblings, but lovers. Explaining the couple's fictional backstory, Fisher stated: "We've only known each other three years, but we've been going out since we were 12. We say we're brother and sister so the Government doesn't split us up." She also said the characters have a co-dependent relationship, saying that while most 15 year old's relationships were sexual, Curtis and Shannon's was "more deep-seated". She added that they had formed a close bond like most siblings, but it was stronger. Both actors admitted their kissing scenes made them consider their age difference, with Fisher pointing out she was almost five years older than Ammann.

Curtis has a brief relationship with exchange student Laura Bonetti (Claudia Buttazonni). When she arrives in Summer Bay, both Curtis and his friend Jack Wilson (Daniel Amalm) develop a crush on Laura. Laura initially befriends Jack, but when he realises that she is using him as "a go-between" to get to Curtis, the boys fall out. Victoria Ross of Inside Soap observed that before long it emerges that Laura is "completely bonkers!" Ammann said Curtis is "pretty easily led" and that as he is smitten with Laura, it does not take much for her to lead him astray. Laura persuades Curtis to hide in a supermarket with her, until it is closed and they are alone. However, neither of them realise that they have been caught on CCTV cameras. Although they both wore balaclavas, Curtis worries that he will be identified and arrested. Ammann explained, "Although Curtis gets involved in playing out lots of dares, he eventually realises that he's doing something wrong and that the supermarket prank is the final straw. So when he finds out that the police are getting involved he's full of remorse."

Curtis also has a romance with Selina Cook (Tempany Deckert). Ammann was forced to take leave from the show when he contracted chicken pox, upon his return it was suspected he had glandular fever. Producers forced co-star Deckert to have a blood test after they shared many kissing scenes. Upon their return the amount of intimate scenes between the two was intentionally reduced.

In late 1996, Ammann was written out of Home and Away, after producers informed him that they would be ending his contract two months early. Amman confirmed that he would finish up in March 1997 and admitted that he was looking forward to leaving the show. He felt that had "lost two-and-a-half years of his life, stating that "I've gone quickly from being young to being independent and looking after myself. I don't have much of a private life at the moment." Ammann left the serial in 1997 at a time many other cast members decided to quit their roles.

He told Steven Murphy from Inside Soap that "It wasn't my decision to leave, the producers decided to finish my contract two months early. They basically give you a date when you're finishing and that's it." Amman believed that producers had run out of stories for Curtis. He added "Curtis had been through all the women in the Bay, so he had to leave!" Amman also claimed that Home and Away writers struggle to write for older characters. He noted that characters such as Shane Parrish (Dieter Brummer) were married off once they grew older and that he was glad Curtis did not receive the same outcome. In Curtis' final storyline he decides to leave Summer Bay to begin a career on the professional surfing circuit.

== Storylines ==
Curtis arrives in Summer Bay along with Shannon Reed after their adoptive mother Elizabeth dies. Curtis and Shannon are fostered by the Stewart and Ross families, respectively. One evening, Alf returns home early and catches Curtis and Shannon kissing passionately on the couch. The pair quickly explain that they are not really related and have been a couple for several years. However, Curtis and Shannon eventually break up, but remain friends. Curtis befriends Jack Wilson and they get into various scrapes.

When Italian exchange student, Laura Bonetti arrives to stay with the Stewarts, Curtis is smitten with her and so is Jack but Laura prefers Curtis and they begin dating and Laura leads Curtis astray. Ailsa and Curtis' friends are unimpressed with Laura's rebellious ways but their opinions falls on deaf ears. One night, Laura seeking a thrill, dares Curtis to cross a railway line in front of an oncoming train, Curtis backs out but Laura goes ahead and is instantly killed by the train. Following Laura's death, Curtis sinks into depression and begin drowning his sorrows in alcohol, which he uses Ailsa's credit card to order. His destructive behaviour culminates in him trashing a classroom. Travis Nash (Nic Testoni), a witness to Laura's death, helps Curtis beat his alcoholism and sympathises as his girlfriend had died several years previously.

Curtis then begins a relationship with Selina who has been attracted to him since he first arrived in the bay. Nelson McFarlane (Laurence Bruels), Selina's old flame returns to town and Curtis is worried that she will go back to him but Nelson later dates Sally Fletcher (Kate Ritchie) and Curtis and Selina remain together. Curtis' relationship with Selina does not last very long and they break up after Selina feels she has outgrown him.

Curtis begin dating Chloe Richards (Kristy Wright) who is beating a speed addiction. Curtis helps her through it and in turn she helps him come to terms with his diabetes and they began a relationship. When Chloe is raped one night while walking home along the beach, Curtis supports her but several months later both agree to a mutual breakup.

After falling out with the Stewarts and leaving home to move in at Travis' place, Curtis decides to pursue a surfing career. During this, Jenna Evans appears and he is taken aback due to Jenna's uncanny resemblance to Laura who had died two years previous. After breaking up with Casey Mitchell (Rebecca Croft), He becomes involved with Jenna. When Sean Graham (Anthony Engelman) comes looking for Jenna, he reveals he is her husband and warns Curtis to stay away. It transpires that Jenna's real name is Lisa and she changed her name and fled to Summer Bay to escape Sean's abusive nature. Sean drags Jenna home with him but she flees to her parents. Curtis refuses to give up on Jenna and she stands up to Sean and he leaves. Curtis then leaves the bay to pursue a career in the professional surfing circuit and Jenna agrees to go with him.

== Reception ==
Ahead of Curtis and Shannon's arrival, Rachel Browne for The Sydney Morning Herald noted how the show was filled with "pert, pimple-free teenagers" and stated "Given that both teen actors look like they stepped off the pages of a glossy magazine, both are likely to adapt to their new home beautifully." Writing for The Sun-Herald, Browne branded Curtis "the new stud of Summer Bay High", after he romanced both Chloe and Casey. Inside Soap's Steven Murphy described Curtis as a "young surf dude Curtis Reed arrived in Summer Bay two-and-a-half years ago. We've watched the shy young boy, still traumatised from the death of his adoptive mother, grow into a confident young man, in love and about to set off on a new career."
