= Adrian Lee (actor) =

Australian actor

- Born: 27 December 1966 (age 59); Auckland, New Zealand
- Occupation: Actor
- Years active: 1990–present

Adrian Lee (born 27 December 1966) is a New Zealand-born Australian actor.

== Early life ==
Lee was born in New Zealand. He was raised by his father, country singer Daryl Lee, after his parents separated when he was three years old. When his father returned to New Zealand and remarried, Lee moved in with his mother when he was 19.

Lee was in a band called The Notions, which had some success, but he had to quit because the band clashed with his part-time landscaping job and acting auditions.

== Career ==
Lee's first major screen role was Marco Rossi in the short-lived soap opera Family and Friends in 1990. He then joined the main cast of E Street as drifter Craig "C.J." Jones that same year. The following year, he appeared in the 1991 ABC miniseries Brides of Christ as Kevin. He starred on Pacific Drive as Joel Ritchie in 1996.

Lee appeared in Home and Away from March 1995 as maths teacher Andrew Warren. Other TV appearances include The Flying Doctors, G.P., and All Saints. He was also in a rock band called Phobia with fellow musician Phil Ceberano (brother of Kate Ceberano).
