= Kelly Watson =

- Home and Away character
- Portrayed by: Katrina Hobbs
- Duration: 1995–1997
- First appearance: 28 August 1995
- Last appearance: 25 April 1997
- Introduced by: John Holmes
In-universe information
- Occupation: Doctor
- Father: Murray Watson
- Mother: Carol Watson
- Sisters: Rachel Watson

Kelly Watson is a fictional character from the Australian soap opera Home and Away portrayed by Katrina Hobbs. She made her first screen appearance during the episode broadcast on 28 August 1995 and departed on 25 April 1997.

== Casting ==
Hobbs is from New Zealand and while working with fellow actor Craig McLachlan on a film, he convinced her to work overseas and she soon moved to Australia. Hobbs refined her accent and learned the nuances of the Australian language in order to secure work in the country. After acquiring an agent, she had a small role in Cody and two commercials, before auditioning for Home and Away. Hobbs told Di Stanley of TV Week that she was due to fly back to New Zealand to attend a film and television awards ceremony when "the Home and Away people" called her and offered her the role of Kelly. Of her casting, Hobbs stated: "I've always wanted to play a doctor. I don't know why. Maybe it's the white coat and stethoscope, like Chicago Hope and ER. It's exciting!" To prepare for the role, Hobbs shadowed doctors around Sydney's St Vincent's Hospital and took notes. She began filming in late June and her casting was publicised in the 12 August 1995 issue of TV Week. In an interview with Daniel Dasey from The Sydney Morning Herald, Hobbs revealed that her fellow cast members labelled her "Doctor Death", following the death of Shane Parrish (Dieter Brummer).

== Development ==
Hobbs described Kelly as being "very centred, she is very strong, she's very businesslike, especially when she's working." Hobbs thought that her character could come across as "a little bit insensitive" due to being so centred, but Hobbs said she was not. Hobbs continued: "She's a career woman who knows what she wants and goes out and does it, and if there's any problems, she just deals with them as they come along." Hobbs also called Kelly "a real sportsgirl" and explained that in her fictional backstory, her father wanted her to do triathlons and was disappointed when she chose to focus on medicine.

In November 1995, producers paired Kelly with Travis Nash (Nic Testoni) for a new adult romantic relationship storyline. After weeks of flirting, the pair embark on a proper relationship. Testoni quipped "There's this intense energy bubble that surrounds Dr Kelly, and Travis is there to burst that bubble!" Hobbs explained that her character is "heavily attracted" to Travis and thinks he is a great guy. Although she finds him "a bit too relaxed for her", Kelly is "a worrier" and he does help her to relax. Hobbs believed that Kelly and Travis were a good match. She told a reporter from Inside Soap that "Kelly's a real go-getter and has tremendous drive, which I love. While Travis is relaxed, quiet and into nature – plus he's gorgeous! They're great together." Di Stanley of TV Week pointed out that like most love stories, there is a casualty and in this case it is Steven Matheson (Adam Willits), who becomes "the third wheel" in the couple's relationship. Steven had feelings for Kelly and Testoni sympathised with him, saying "Poor old Steven. Kelly and Travis are always heading off into the bedroom and he keeps getting kicked out."

Writers created an HIV scare story for the doctor which played out following an accident at work. Kelly cuts herself when she is treating an HIV positive patient. She has to take a test for the virus and is forced to wait for the results. The story highlighted prejudice that exists around the condition as Kelly hoped her friends would support her, but she falls victim to the "small-town prejudice" in Summer Bay. Hobbs said "it's a terrible time for Kelly, not only does she face closed minds but she has to dump her boyfriend too." Kelly fears that staying with Travis could lead to him contracting HIV too. The actress added "she feels that for Travis' sake she should back off. She doesn't want to risk infecting him if the test results are positive."

The story was challenging for Hobbs because she had two friends who died from AIDS as a result of HIV. She recalled that it was heartbreaking but credited the story with a "terrific response" from viewers in the Australian outback, where she believed attitudes towards the illness were changing.

Hobbs decided to leave Home and Away in 1997. Hobbs admitted that while she was sad about leaving, she wanted to move on and get into feature films. She also planned to take some of her character's attributes and apply them to her own life. In Kelly's final storyline, she decides not to go through with her wedding to Travis, as she knows that he does not want to move to the city. Instead she leaves alone for a new job.

== Storylines ==
Kelly is first seen at Northern Districts Hospital treating Nelson McFarlane (Laurence Bruels), who has been badly burned in the recent bushfire. She meets Steven Matheson (Willits) who is visiting Nelson and there seems to be a spark between the pair of them. When Kelly decides to move to Summer Bay to be closer to work, she and Steven rent Travis' house. Travis returns from Canada and moves in, much to Kelly's chagrin. There is visible tension between Kelly and Travis and this leads to the destruction of a tape exonerating Steven, who has been accused of murdering his nemesis Brian "Dodge" Forbes (Kelly Dingwall). Dodge kidnaps Kelly in order to lure Steven into a final showdown and he leaves her tied up in the boot of his car. Travis rescues Kelly and finds her severely dehydrated. Kelly and Travis soon become close and begin a relationship. Kelly's sister Rachel (Tasma Walton) visits and is involved in a car crash that ends up killing her boyfriend, Rick (Andrew Rododera) and blames Kelly for not doing enough to save him.

While taking blood from a patient, Kelly's is pricked by a needle and is horrified to learn that the patient is HIV-positive and may be infected. News travels around town and Ailsa Stewart (Judy Nunn), although supportive, refuses to let Kelly treat her son Duncan (Lewis Devaney) when he suffers a cut. Ken Treloar (Stan Zemanek) the host of a talk show on local radio begins targeting Ailsa over her treatment of Kelly, but Kelly rings in to defend her. The tests arrive back and Kelly is relieved when they are negative. Kelly believes herself to be the target of a hate campaign perpetrated by Debbie Salter (Kim Lewis), a woman obsessed with Travis, when she is bitten by a funnel web spider in her bed. Travis visits Kelly in hospital and is angered to find Debbie there, but Kelly urges him to hear Debbie out and it turns out the spider was planted there as a malicious prank by Debbie's 13-year-old daughter Mikki.

Kelly later finds herself in the unexpected position of mother figure when Stephanie Mboto (Fleur Beaupert) the younger sister of Travis' deceased girlfriend arrives in Summer Bay. After Steven is fired from teaching after his relationship with Selina Roberts (Tempany Deckert) is exposed, Kelly offers support but he turns on her and Travis and launches a verbal outburst that leads to Travis punching him and evicting him. When Ailsa's husband, Alf (Ray Meagher) undergoes an emergency bypass operation and suffers complications, Kelly is forced to operate on him in theatre after the operating doctor James McLaren (Grant Dodwell) doesn't respond to the bleep because he is playing a round of golf. She keeps Alf alive until McLaren returns. Ailsa is annoyed and threatens to sue should anything go wrong with Alf's surgery until Pippa Ross (Debra Lawrence) points out that Kelly should never have been put in that situation.

Kelly's parents Murray (Ron Graham) and Carol (Rona Coleman) arrive, much to her shock and announce they are divorcing. Murray stays for a while and Travis asks him for Kelly's hand in marriage, which outrages her because she deems such an approach old-fashioned. Travis then proposes directly which she accepts but Kelly feels that living in a country town like Summer Bay is not for her so she decides to take a job in the city. Travis agrees to go with her but Kelly realises that city life is not for Travis and leaves alone after leaving a note for Travis saying she still loves him.

== Reception ==
For her portrayal of Kelly, Hobbs received a nomination for the Logie Award for Most Popular New Talent in 1996. A viewer wrote to The Daily Mirror and asked "wouldn't it be nice if our GPs were like Kelly from Home And Away? Everytime the hospital appears, there she is, whatever the department. And anyone sick gets a home visit." An Inside Soap reporter stated "tall, dark and smart, she's the dishiest doc on the box, setting pulses racing all over Summer Bay! Men are ready to duel at dawn over who's going to win her heart, and blood pressure is rising to dangerous levels!"
