= Sam Marshall =

- Home and Away character
- Portrayed by: Ryan Clark
- Duration: 1991–2002, 2005
- First appearance: 3 April 1991
- Last appearance: 8 July 2005
- Introduced by: Des Monaghan (1991); Julie McGuaran (2002, 2005)
In-universe information
- Other names: Sam Nicholls
- Occupation: Student at Summer Bay Primary (1991–94); Student at Summer Bay High (1995–2000); Surfer (2000); Nightwatchman (2001); Carpenter (2002–)
- Father: Greg Marshall
- Mother: Jackie Nicholls
- Adoptive mother: Bobby Marshall

Sam Marshall (previously Nicholls) is a fictional character from the Australian soap opera Home and Away, played by former actor Ryan Clark. He made his first on screen appearance on 3 April 1991. Sam remained in Home and Away until 2001. He later returned for brief stints in 2002 and 2005.

== Casting ==
Shortly after joining an actors agency when he was seven years old, Clark was sent to audition for Home and Away, and he secured the role of Sam in 1991. Clark admitted to being surprised at being cast, saying "I hadn't had any acting lessons, so I was shocked when they phoned up to say I had got the part." He was only allowed to film Home and Away for three days a week, so he could attend school during the remaining days. Clark was provided with a tutor on set so he could keep up with his schoolwork. In 1996, Clark broke his ankle while playing rugby and was forced to use crutches for six weeks. He returned to filming straight away and producers decided to write his ailment into the scripts; this results in Sam breaking his ankle while playing football.

Clark decided to leave the serial in 2000 in order to pursue a surfing career. He returned to the role in 2001. In 2005, Clark reprised the role alongside several past cast members to celebrate the serial's 4000th episode.

== Character development ==
Sam was introduced into the serial as a foster child of Bobby Simpson (Nicolle Dickson). His father, Greg Marshall (Ross Newton) is later introduced into the series and goes onto marry Bobby. However, Bobby dies in a boating accident and Greg abandons him. Sam is subsequently fostered by Pippa (Debra Lawrance) and Michael Ross (Dennis Coard). Sam features in the serial's 1996 "disaster" storyline in which a storm passes through Summer Bay. Sam is washed into a river and Michael dies after attempting to save him. A columnist for MSN online described the character's tenure stating that "with basically everyone parental in his life either dying or skipping town, Sam was moved between families like a young pass-the-parcel."

When Pippa departs the series, Sam is placed in Rebecca (Belinda Emmett) and Travis Nash's (Nic Testoni) care. The official Home and Away website stated that Sam's personality changed during this period. He becomes "very prickly and rebellious". Rebecca and Travis cannot cope with a "restless teenager's behaviour" and send him to live with Donald Fisher (Norman Coburn).

After several years apart, Sam arranges a reunion with Greg. However, Sam is left feeling betrayed and disappointed when Greg fails to show up. Sam returns home to his guardian Donald and he hopes for some comforting words from him, but Donald cannot bring himself to open up. A writer for Inside Soap said Sam and Donald "really need to share their feelings and comfort each other", but neither one wants to make the first move.

In 1998, Jason Herbison from Inside Soap reported that Rebecca O'Dare had signed up to play Sam's new love interest Pam Edmondson. He added that the storyline was scheduled to last a "couple of weeks" and would not really develop much. Another love interest for the character was introduced later that year. Herbison's colleague Annette Dasey said Sam would have his "first big romance" with Daria Ellis (Tamra Williams), the hippy daughter of the new surf shop owner. Clark said it is love at first sight for Sam, explaining "She's meditating in her front yard when he rides past on his paper round. Sam thinks she's absolutely gorgeous." The other teens in the Bay tease Sam because of Daria's appearance and views on alternative philosophies. In another storyline, Sam begins a relationship with Hayley Smith (Bec Cartwright). Their relationship takes "a battering" and he turns into a "green-eyed monster" when Hayley becomes friends with Mitch McColl (Cameron Welsh). Sam ends his relationship with Hayley because of Mitch. The serial's website also stated that Sam and Hayley "had so much in common" and "were good mates apart from anything else".

When Clark quit the series in 2000, producers devised an exit storyline which saw Sam entering a surf competition. Donald then gives his permission to let Sam join a pro surfing tour to pursue his "true calling".

When Sam returns in 2002, he reveals that he has become successful on the professional surfing circuit.

== Storylines ==
Sam is fostered by Bobby after his mother Jackie (Erica Williams) struggles to look after him. Sam and Bobby bond but it is short-lived when Jackie gets a new job and returns to collect Sam. After Jackie struggles to cope with Sam again and he goes missing, Bobby permanently fosters him. Sam's father Greg arrives in the bay but Bobby refuses to let him see Sam and they battle over his custody. Bobby relents and grows closer to Greg and they fall in love eventually marry. Bobby decides to adopt Sam. Bobby dies in a boating accident caused by family friend Adam Cameron (Mat Stevenson). Sam blames Adam and Greg can no longer cope with Sam and abandons him. Sam is later fostered by Pippa and Michael and has minimal contact with Greg for several years. Sam is generally happy with the Rosses but Michael dies during a flood trying to rescue Sam. Both Sam and Jack Wilson (Daniel Amalm), blame themselves for Michael's death.

Following Pippa's departure with her new husband, Ian Routledge (Patrick Dickson) to the Carrington ranges in 1998, Sam cannot get used to his new carers Travis and Rebecca and becomes rebellious. Sam is involved in illegal activities with Rod Sutton (Nick Atkinson) and are both arrested. Sam appears in court and is given a good behaviour bond after Donald gives him a character reference. Donald suggests Sam live with him and he moves out of Summer Bay House.

When Hayley arrives in town she and Sam forge a very tight friendship and get into various scrapes. They begin dating in late 1999, but three becomes a crowd when Mitch is interested in Hayley. Hayley and Sam eventually break up. Greg reappears in Sam's life and he is keen to rebuild their relationship but Sam opts to stay in Summer Bay. Sam later drops out of school and leaves the bay to become a professional surfer against Donald's wishes. Sam returns several months later and has resumes a small fling with Hayley. His behaviour is suspicious and it is revealed Sam is smoking marijuana following his failure as surfer. This comes to a head when Sam crashes his car while high. Sam later leaves but returns and becomes involved with a girl called Sandy King (Renee Hodson) who has a daughter, Bella from a previous relationship. They later leave the bay and relocate to the city. Sam returns the following year for Summer Bay's sesquicentennial celebrations and in 2005 for Alf Stewart's (Ray Meagher) 60th birthday.

== Reception ==
Chad Watson & Linda Barnier of The Newcastle Herald said that it was "no wonder" Clark quit the series because Sam was "the product of a broken home whose foster mother died after marrying his birth father". They also noted that the older Clark grew on-screen the bigger his "female fanbase" grew. Glenn Wheeler of The Morning Show opined that Sam formed a part of one of Australian television's "much loved families" for a decade. Sam was popular with teenage female demographic, who would tune into the show daily to watch the character. While the role gave Clark "sex symbol" status, he said "I got more shit from the boys, than praise from the girls back then." MSN online's columnist opined that Clark played "one of Australia's very own '90s teen heartthrobs".
