= Kristy Wright =

Australian television and film actress

- Born: 14 July 1978 (age 48); Sydney, Australia
- Occupation: Actress
- Years active: 1994–present
- Notable work: Home and Away
- Children: 1

Kristy Wright (born 14 July 1978; name also erroneously given as Kirsty Wright) is an Australian television and film actress.

== Early life ==
Wright was born in Sydney, Australia, the oldest child in her family, with three stepbrothers and two half-sisters. Hoping to win a contest for acting lessons, she sent in her photograph and ended up with a full year's paid tuition.

== Career ==
Her first part was a guest role in Police Rescue. From 1995 until 1999 she played the part of Chloe Richards in the Australian soap opera Home and Away and briefly returned to this role in June 2005, when her character died from an embolism resulting from a car accident.

Following Home and Away she starred in Chuck Finn, Above the Law and Something in the Air. She went on to feature in Crash Palace as well as a political satire called Corridors of Power. Following this success she was picked up to feature in an American TV show, Beastmaster as a ninja warrior. She also appeared in a short film, Sweet Dreams.

She worked on an episode of Sir Arthur Conan Doyle’s – The Lost World, and has also featured in the Australian drama, The Alice. She had a minor role as the hand maiden Moteé in Star Wars: Episode III – Revenge of the Sith.

== Personal life ==
Wright dated fellow Home and Away alumni, the late Dieter Brummer, from 1995 (when she was 17) for several years, after their tenure on the series overlapped for a year. They remained friends after their split. After his death in 2021, she honoured him on her Instagram page with a series of photos from their time together.

Wright moved to Los Angeles in 2006 to pursue acting in Hollywood as the logical next step in her career. However, she eventually decided to quit acting in order to focus on other interests and start a family.

On 8 August 2013, she gave birth to a son, during her 27th week of pregnancy. He weighed 2lbs 4oz and was 14.5 inches long.

== Filmography ==
=== Film ===
Year	Title	Role	Notes
2000	Enemies Closer	Samantha	Feature film
2002	Sweet Dreams		Short film
2004	The Crop	Nancy	Feature film
2005	Star Wars: Episode III – Revenge of the Sith	Moteé	Feature film
2005	Wrong Answer	Holly Aurelli	Short film
2017	Ravenswood Asylum	Yvonne	Feature film
2021	Christmas Down Under	Samantha Parker	Feature film
2023	Stranded Pearl	Julia	Feature film

=== Television ===
Year	Title	Role	Notes
1994	Home and Away	Donna	Season 7, episode 114
1995	Police Rescue	Cassie	Season 4, episode 4
1995–99, 2005	Home and Away	Chloe Richards	Seasons 8–12 (main role), Season 18 (recurring)
1999	Chuck Finn	Rosy	Season 1, episode 14
2000	Above the Law	Belinda Clarke	Seasons 1–2 (main role, 35 episodes)
2001	The Lost World	Ana Pisaro	Season 2, episode 10
2001	Something in the Air	Lisa Cambridge	Season 2 (recurring, 13 episodes)
2001	Crash Palace	Suze Collins	Season 1 (main role)
2001	Corridors of Power	Vanessa 'Van' Harrison	Season 1 (main role, 6 episodes)
2002	Beastmaster	Bianna	Season 3, episode 19
2003	White Collar Blue	Summah Shareef	Season 2, episode 11
2005	The Alice	Simone	Season 1, episode 4
