= Ryan Clark (actor) =

Australian actor, lifeguard (born 1983)

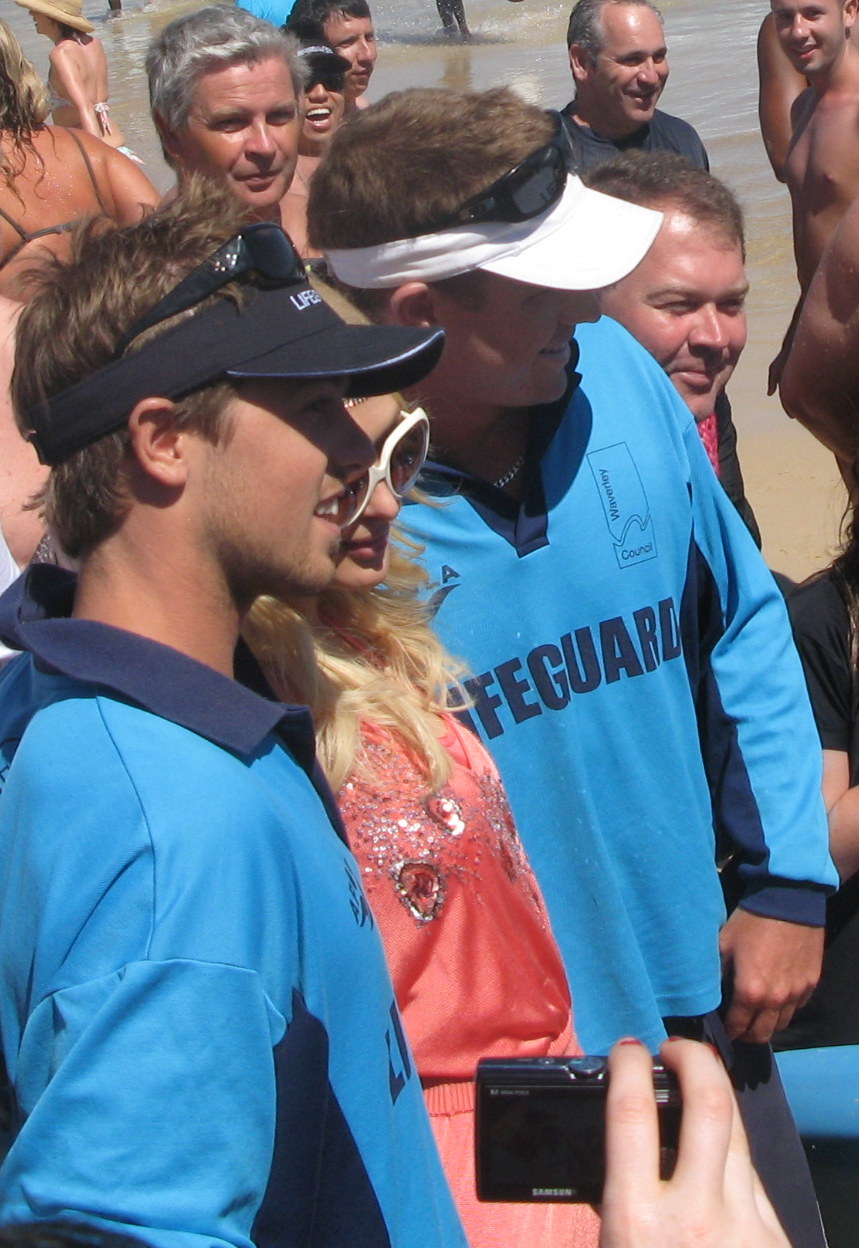
- Clark (in white cap) in 2008
- Born: Ryan James Clark; 9 April 1983 (age 43); Sydney, New South Wales, Australia
- Occupations: Actor; Lifeguard
- Years active: 1991–present

Ryan James Clark (born 9 April 1983) is an Australian lifeguard and former television and film actor. He became known for his portrayal of Sam Marshall in Home and Away over the course of a decade, from 1991 until 2001 before becoming a Waverley Council lifeguard on Bondi Beach and featuring in Bondi Rescue.

== Early life ==
Clark was born in Sydney, New South Wales, Australia, and was raised in the Sydney beachside suburb of Bronte. He was a member of Bronte Surf Club as a child.

== Career ==
=== Acting ===
Clark is best known for his role as Sam Marshall in the soap opera Home and Away. He auditioned for the series and secured the role in 1991, shortly after joining an actors agency at the age of seven. Clark was surprised at having been cast, as he had never undertaken acting classes. He was only allowed to film three days a week, so he could continue to attend school. However, he was provided with a tutor on set so he could keep up with his schoolwork.

Clark decided to leave the serial in 2000 in order to pursue a surfing career. He returned to the role in a guest capacity in 2001. In 2005, Clark reprised the role alongside several past cast members to celebrate the serial's 4000th episode.

Clark appeared as Pete, an Australian surfer in the 2000 direct-to-video film Our Lips Are Sealed, featuring the Olsen Twins. In 2003, he made a guest appearance in an episode of White Collar Blue, and in 2008, he played a minor role in the Australian film The Black Balloon. In May 2024 after more than a decade away from acting, Clark was named as part of the cast for feature film Kangaroo.

=== Bondi lifeguard ===
In 2003, Clark began working as a Waverley Council lifeguard on Bondi Beach, and since 2006, has featured in the factual television programme Bondi Rescue. As a lifeguard, he is better known by his nickname 'Whippet'.

== Filmography ==
=== Television ===
Year	Title	Role	Type
1991–2001, 2002, 2005	Home and Away	Sam Marshall	TV soap opera, 615 episodes
2003	White Collar Blue	Michael Spencer	TV series, 1 episode
2006–2021	Bondi Rescue	Himself	Reality documentary series, 113 episodes
2008	Bondi Rescue Bali	Self (Ryan 'Whippet' Clark)	Reality documentary series, 7 episodes
2020	Freesurfer Series Two	Host	TV series,
2022	Surftag Championships 2022	Host	TV special

=== Film ===
Year	Title	Role	Type
2000	Our Lips Are Sealed	Pete	Film
2008	The Black Balloon	Dean	Feature film
2013	Beach Bum	Lifeguard	Short film
2025	Kangaroo	Lifeguard Jonesy	Film

== Personal life ==
As of 2018, Clark and his wife, Gina, have two children.
