= Norman Coburn =

Australian actor (born 1937)

- Born: 6 March 1937 (age 89); Sydney, New South Wales, Australia
- Education: Australian Elizabethan Theatre Trust
- Occupations: Actor; playwright; writer
- Years active: 1951–2008; 2019
- Known for: Home and Away as Donald Fisher

Norman Coburn (born 6 March 1937) is an Australian former actor, playwright and writer best known for his television serial and soap opera roles. He started his early career in theatre, film and television in the United Kingdom in the mid-1950s.

Coburn became famous as High School English teacher and Deputy/headmaster Donald Fisher in the early years of the soap opera Home and Away. As one of 16 original cast members, he appeared from the pilot episode in 1988 until 2003, and reprised the character in brief sporadic returns between 2004 and 2007. Coburn retired from the industry in 2008, with the exception of a TV series guest appearance in 2019.

== Early life ==
Coburn was born in Sydney, New South Wales, Australia and trained with the Australian Elizabethan Theatre Trust in North Sydney, Australia, before travelling to Britain in the 1950s to pursue an acting career. He appeared briefly in iconic British TV shows such as Dixon of Dock Green and Coronation Street. He quit acting for a time and worked as a restaurateur in London before moving to Cornwall in the south west of the country. Here he owned a vineyard and was involved in converting BBC ventriloquist and artist Francis Coudrill's studio in St Ives into The Mermaid Seafood Restaurant. After being in Cornwall for a number of years in the 1970s, he returned to Australia in the early 1980s and decided to take on acting roles again, one of which, would be the role of Donald Fisher in soap opera Home and Away.

== Career ==
Coburn is best known for his portrayal of Donald Fisher, the principal of Summer Bay High School, in the Australian soap opera Home and Away. He appeared from the show's pilot episode in 1988 until 2003. Coburn was featured in the Guinness World Records as the longest serving actor in an Australian serial, along with co-stars Ray Meagher and Kate Ritchie. Since his departure from Home and Away, he has returned in consecutive guest appearances, the last being in 2007.

In 2014, 11 years after leaving Home and Away, he was featured in a photo shoot for New Idea, in a reunion with former cast members Nicolle Dickson who played his daughter Bobby, Ross Newton, who played Greg and Ryan Clark who played his adoptive grandson.

Coburn has also appeared briefly in guest roles in soap opera including The Young Doctors, A Country Practice, Sons and Daughters, Special Squad, The Hollowmen and Rosehaven.

== Personal life ==
Coburn originally resided in Perth, and later Brisbane, Queensland. He currently resides on Bruny Island, located off the south-eastern coast of Tasmania, Australia. His daughter Nana Coburn, (born 28 September 1971) is an actress best known for her two roles as Vicki Baxter and Lisa Matthews on Home and Away.

== Filmography ==
=== Film ===
| Year | Title | Role | Notes |
|---|---|---|---|
| 1960 | Circle of Deception | Carter (uncredited) | Feature film |
| 1961 | On the Fiddle | Uncredited | Feature film |
| 1962 | Carry On Cruising | Wireless Operator (uncredited) | Feature film |
| 1962 | The Ghost Sonata | Coffin Bearer | TV film |
| 1963 | Tomorrow at Ten | Desk Man | Feature film |
| 1981 | A Step in the Right Direction | | TV film |
| 1983 | At Last... Bullamakanka: The Motion Picture | Walter Williams | Feature film |

=== Television ===
| Year | Title | Role | Notes |
|---|---|---|---|
| 1958, 1963 | Dixon of Dock Green | Jimmy / Wedding Guest (uncredited) | Season 5, episode 3 Season 9 episode 17 |
| 1960 | Coronation Street | Labourer (uncredited) | 1 episode |
| 1961 | Maigret | Extra (uncredited) | 1 episode |
| 1962 | Suspense | 2nd Ambulance Man | Season 1, episode 1 |
| 1962 | The Andromeda Breakthrough | Crowd Extra | Season 1, episode 2 |
| 1962 | Compact | James Crown | Episodes 73-75 |
| 1982 | A Country Practice | Neville Roebuck | Season 2, episodes 1-2 |
| 1982 | 1915 | English P.O.W. | Miniseries, episode 7 |
| 1983 | Five Mile Creek | Stage Coach Passenger | Season 1, episode 1 |
| 1984 | Special Squad | Griffin | Season 1, episode 5 |
| 1986 | Sons and Daughters | Fred Sykes | Season 5, episode 42 |
| 1987 | Rafferty's Rules | Const. Skeggs / Doug | 2 episodes |
| 1988-2003, 2004–05, 2007 | Home and Away | Donald Fisher | Seasons 1-16 (main; 1,489 episodes); Seasons 17-18, 20 (recurring; 36 episodes) |
| 2008 | The Hollowmen | Jeff | Season 2, episode 6 |
| 2019 | Rosehaven | Gareth | Season 3, episode 2 |

== Theatre ==
sourced from AusStage

| Title | Year |
|---|---|
| Happy Returns | 1955/1956 |
| Twelfth Night | 1956 |
| The Rivals | 1956 |
| Blood Orange | 1956 |
| Hamlet | 1957 |
| The Relapse | 1957 |
| White Nancy | 1982 |
| A Night in the Arms of Raeleen | 1982 |
| Once in a Blue Moon | 1983 |
| Quartermaines Terms | 1983 |
| Hanging Together | 1984 |
| Visitor from Mamaronick | 1985 |
| Whose Life Is It Anyway? | 1987 |
| D Week | 1987 |
| The Diary of Anne Frank | 1987 |
| Married Together | 1992 |
| Humble Boy | 2004 |
| Retreat From Moscow | 2005 |
| Death of a Salesman | 2008 |
