= Daniel Amalm =

Australian former actor and musician

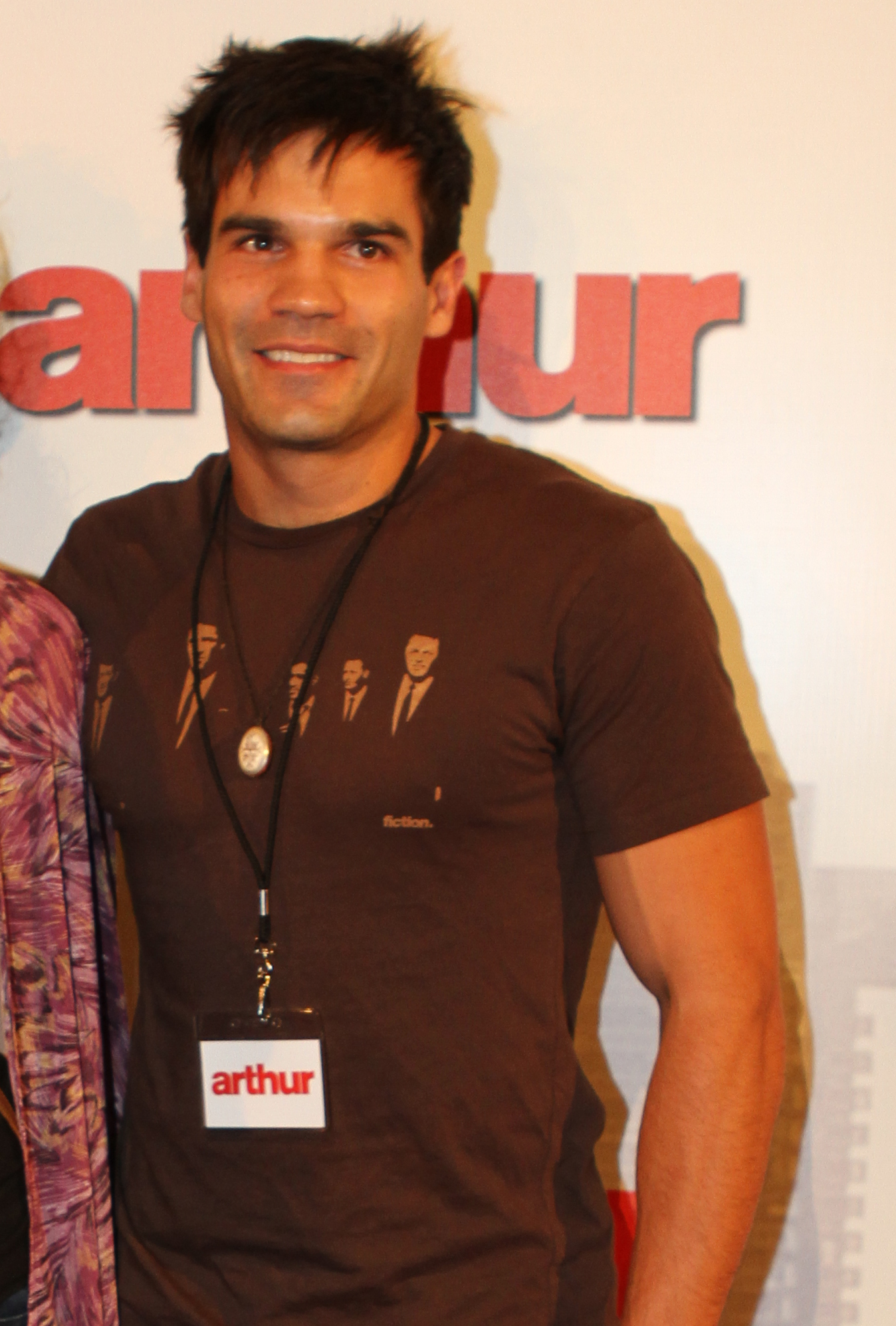
- Amalm in 2011
- Born: Daniel Edvard Amalm; 16 February 1979 (age 47); Brisbane, Australia
- Occupations: Actor and musician
- Years active: 1994–present

Daniel Edvard Amalm (born 16 February 1979) is an Australian actor and musician, best known for his role in serial Home and Away as foster kid Jack Wilson.

== Early life ==
Amalm was born in Brisbane, Queensland on 16 February 1979, his mother is Maltese and his father is Swedish. Amalm's father introduced him to guitar from an early age. Amalm's first performances were as a busker in Brisbane's Queen Street Mall with his brother where they were spotted by George Benson's tour manager and invited to Benson's sound check. The Amalm brothers jammed with George Benson and after the jam Benson donated his own money towards a new guitar that the brothers had been saving for. With that guitar Daniel Amalm won a scholarship to study guitar at the Queensland Conservatorium of Music. and was trained in classical guitar under Julian Byzantine. Amalm performed as one of the guitarists in "An Angel Moves Too Fast To See" written by Rhys Chatham for 100 electric guitars for the Brisbane Biennial on 4–5 June 1993. Amalm was runner up in the 9th Australian Classical Spanish Guitar Competition.

== Career ==
Daniel's first television role of Jack Wilson in television soap opera Home and Away in 1994 and he was nominated for the Logie Award Most Popular New Talent in 1995.

In 1996, Amalm left Home and Away and recorded a single, "Classical Gas", which was a top 40 hit on the ARIA Charts and No.5 on the Dance Charts; followed by "Honey Dip Girl", which was voted No. 1 on Network Ten's Video Hits for 5 consecutive weeks. In 2000, he returned to Home and Away for a guest appearance and also appeared in TVserialk's All Saints and Tripping Over.

Daniel has worked as a music teacher in classical, flamenco and rock guitar. He has performed the live circuit with various Latin/rock covers and originals bands and wrote with alternative/metal band OP25. Daniel's brother Jacob plays drums in OP25. The band contributed to the original motion picture soundtrack of Two Fists One Heart with a song called 'Like No Other'.

Daniel appeared in the Nine Network drama series Underbelly in 2008 as Melbourne underworld figure, Dino Dibra. He also starred in the Australian film Two Fists, One Heart which was released 19 March 2009 and Cedar Boys released July 2009.

In 2009, Amalm began a regular role in drama series Rescue: Special Ops as Jordan Zwitkowski on the Nine Network and co-hosted FOX8's adaptation of the boxing reality series The Contender.

Daniel released an ambient classical guitar album in 2019 titled "Guitared" and a flamenco album in 2020 titled "Kaldera".

== Filmography ==
=== Television ===
Year	Title	Role	Notes
2023	One Night	John Zantiotis	2 episodes
2022	Pieces of Her	Lean Man	2 episodes
2019	Mr Inbetween	Sam	1 episode
2018	Black Comedy	Guest	1 episode
2017	Pulse	Shawn	1 episode
2009–2011	Rescue: Special Ops	Jordan Zwitkowski	48 episodes
2008	Underbelly	Dino Dibra	3 episodes
2006	Tripping Over	Brad	1 episode
2006	All Saints	Moe Atsidakos	1 episode
2001	Cybergirl	Marco	1 episode
1994–1996, 2000	Home and Away	Jack Wilson	328 episodes
1996	Whipping Boy	Youth #1	TV movie

=== Film ===
Year	Title	Role	Notes
2006	Moyuru Toki: The Excellent Company	Mexican	
2008	Two Fists, One Heart	Anthony Argo	
2009	Cedar Boys	Cassar	

== Discography ==
=== Albums ===
List of albums, with selected details
Title	Details
Daniel Amalm	Released: 1996; Format: CD; Label: AMC, EMI Music Australia (4771102)

=== Singles ===
List of singles, with selected chart positions
Title	Year	Peak chart positions	Album
Title	Year	AUS	Album
"Classical Gas"	1996	31	Daniel Amalm
"Any Way You Want It!"	1996	—	Daniel Amalm
"Honey Dip"	1997	81	Daniel Amalm
