= Tempany Deckert =

Australian actress and author

- Born: 2 March 1978 (age 47); Melbourne, Victoria, Australia
- Occupation: Actress
- Years active: 1994–present

Tempany Deckert (born 2 March 1978) is an Australian actress and author, who now resides in Los Angeles, California, United States. She is best known for her role as Selina Cook on soap opera Home and Away from 1994 to 1997, and 1998.

== Early life ==
Tempany Deckert was born in 1978 in Melbourne, Victoria, Australia. She grew up outside the city of Melbourne with her parents and her older sister, make-up artist Kendal Deckert. Deckert had originally planned to do her HSC, but with receiving a role on Home and Away, she chose acting and deferred her education, planning to return in the future to finish her studies.

== Career ==
Deckert began her acting career at the age of ten appearing in theatre productions. She trained at MBCTA youth theatre in Melbourne for six years, until she moved to New York City to extend her training as an adult actor. She appeared in a guest role in RFDS, and walk-on roles on Neighbours. At the age of 16, Deckert relocated to Sydney as she received a lead role in soap opera Home and Away, playing Selina Cook, which lasted for four years. For her portrayal of Selina, Deckert earned a nomination for the Logie Award for Most Popular Actress in 1996. Deckert's decision to leave Home and Away was for greater fame in the United States, which she has since relocated to, living permanently in Los Angeles, like her former co-stars including Isla Fisher and Melissa George. Following her departure from the show, she appeared on drama series' All Saints and The Secret Life of Us, before landing a role in her first feature film, New Skin, which starred Anthony Hayes and Jessica Napier. In 2009, Deckert starred in her first American feature film, Oral Fixation.

In theatre, Deckert has appeared in several productions including Away at the Black Swan Theatre Company in Western Australia, and the award-winning Direct from Broadway at The Edge Theatre in Newtown, Sydney.

Deckert is also the author and illustrator of a number of books including The Green-Eyed Monster, Maddy's Big Break, The Big Fudge, a series of books entitled Fashion Police, and Radio Rebels.

== Filmography ==
=== Film ===
Year	Title	Role	Notes
2001	Melancholy	Catriona	Short film
2002	New Skin	Judy	
2007	No Pink	Erin	Short film
2009	Oral Fixation	Claire Brady	
2016	Somebody's Mother	Kathy	

=== Television ===
Year	Title	Role	Notes
1994	Neighbours	Student	Uncredited
1991	RFDS	May	
1994–1998	Home and Away	Selina Cook	Lead role (Seasons 7–11, 447 episodes); Nominated: Logie Award for Most Popular Actress (1996)
1997	Surprise!, Surprise!	Herself	episode: season 14, episode 11
1997	Light Lunch	Herself	episode: "G'day, G'day, Yum Yum"
1997	The Big Breakfast	Herself	1 episode
1999	All Saints	Andrea Carter	episode: "Roll the Dice"
1999	First Daughter	Cassie	Television film
2001	The Secret Life of Us	Andrena	Television film; episodes: Season 1, episodes 1 & 2
2001	Curse of the Talisman	Miranda	Television film
2007	Jackie Jackie	Donna	Television film
2007	No Pink	Erin	TV Movie
2012	Self Help	Lisa	TV Movie
2022	For All Mankind	Engineer	1 episode
2022	Dahmer	Front Desk Cop	1 episode

== Works ==
- The Green-Eyed Monster - Scholastic Press Australia, 2001. ISBN 1-86504-384-2
- The Big Fudge Part of "The Shooting Stars" series published by Scholastic Press in Australia, 2002. ISBN 1-86504-400-8
- Lights ... Camera ... Ghost! ("The Shooting Stars" series) - Scholastic Press Australia, 2002. ISBN 1-86504-398-2
- The Stage Kiss ("The Shooting Stars" series) - Scholastic Press Australia, 2002. ISBN 1-86504-397-4
- Maddy's Big Break - ("The Shooting Stars" series) - Scholastic Press Australia, ISBN 979-22-1503-4
- Understudy to Miss Perfect ("The Shooting Stars" series) - Scholastic Press Australia, 2003. ISBN 1-86504-399-0
- In Your Dreams - Scholastic Education, Laguna Bay Publishing, 2005. ISBN 1-86504-895-X
- Going Batty - Scholastic Education, Laguna Bay Publishing, 2005. ISBN 1-86504-877-1
- Fashion police : the dorky dance dilemma - Tempany Deckert; illustrated by Rae Dale. South Yarra, Vic. : Macmillan Education Australia, 2007. ISBN 1-4202-0956-6
- Fashion police : the haunted workroom - Tempany Deckert; illustrated by Rae Dale. South Yarra, Vic. : Macmillan Education Australia, 2007. ISBN 1-4202-0957-4
- Fashion police : braving the bully - Tempany Deckert; illustrated by Rae Dale. South Yarra, Vic. : Macmillan Education Australia, 2007. ISBN 1-4202-0958-2
- Fashion police : famous fools - Tempany Deckert; illustrated by Rae Dale. South Yarra, Vic. : Macmillan Education Australia, 2007. ISBN 1-4202-0959-0
- Radio rebels : radio revolution - Tempany Deckert; illustrated by Coral Tulloch. South Yarra, Vic. : Macmillan Education Australia, 2007. ISBN 1-4202-0964-7
- Radio rebels : wiped out - Tempany Deckert; illustrated by Coral Tulloch. South Yarra, Vic. : Macmillan Education Australia, 2007. ISBN 1-4202-0967-1
- Radio rebels : blind revenge - Tempany Deckert; illustrated by Coral Tulloch. South Yarra, Vic. : Macmillan Education Australia, 2007. ISBN 1-4202-0965-5
- Radio rebels : pug hostage - Tempany Deckert; illustrated by Coral Tulloch. South Yarra, Vic. : Macmillan Education Australia, 2007. ISBN 1-4202-0966-3
- Kids Inc Book Series, The Fashion Police Books 1-4 and Radio Rebels Books 1-4 - Macmillan, Australia
