= List of Home and Away characters introduced in 1991 =

Home and Away is an Australian television soap opera. It was first broadcast on the Seven Network on 17 January 1988. The following is a list of characters that first appeared in Home and Away in 1991, by order of first appearance. They were all introduced by the show's executive producer Des Monaghan. The 4th season of Home and Away began airing on the Seven Network on 7 January 1991. The first introduction of the year was Josh Webb in February. Bruce Roberts began appearing as Nick Parrish in March. The following month, Ryan Clark made his debut as Sam Nicholls as did Naomi Watts as Revhead's sister Julie Gibson. Dee Smart began playing Lucinda Croft in June. Her brother David, played by Guy Pearce appeared from July. Alistair MacDougall arrived as Ryan Lee in August. In September, Tina Thomsen, Ross Newton, and Richard Norton joined the cast as Finlay Roberts, Greg Marshall and Simon Fitzgerald, respectively. Finlay's mother, Irene Roberts made her debut in October, followed by her son Damian, played by Matt Doran in November.

== Opening titles timeline ==
Color key
Main cast (opening credits)
Recurring guest star (closing credits in 3+ episodes)
Guest star (closing credits in 1–2 episodes)

| Character | Actor | 1991 | | | | | 1992 | | |
| Character | Actor | 679–758 | 759–845 | 846–857 | 858–870 | 871–910 | 911–1055 | 1056–1095 | 1096–1145 |
|---|---|---|---|---|---|---|---|---|---|
| Pippa Fletcher | Debra Lawrence | M | M | M | M | M | M | M | M |
| Carly Morris | Sharyn Hodgson | M | | | | | | | |
| Sally Fletcher | Kate Ritchie | M | M | M | M | M | M | M | M |
| Ailsa Stewart | Judy Nunn | M | M | M | M | M | M | M | M |
| Alf Stewart | Ray Meagher | M | M | M | M | M | M | M | M |
| Bobby Simpson | Nicolle Dickson | M | M | M | M | M | M | M | M |
| Donald Fisher | Norman Coburn | M | M | M | M | M | M | M | M |
| Adam Cameron | Mat Stevenson | M | M | M | M | M | M | M | M |
| Matt Wilson | Greg Benson | M | M | M | M | M | | | |
| Sophie Simpson | Rebekah Elmaloglou | M | M | M | R | M | M | M | M |
| Ben Lucini | Julian McMahon | M | | | | | | | |
| Marilyn Chambers | Emily Symons | M | M | M | M | M | M | | |
| Blake Dean | Les Hill | M | M | R | R | M | M | M | M |
| Karen Dean | Belinda Jarrett | M | M | | | | | | |
| Michael Ross | Dennis Coard | M | M | M | M | M | M | M | M |
| Haydn Ross | Andrew Hill | M | M | M | | | | | |
| Nick Parrish | Bruce Roberts | R | M | M | M | M | M | M | M |
| Finlay Roberts | Tina Thomsen | | | R | R | M (Note: Thomsen's name is misspelled as "Thomson" in the opening credits of episodes 911–985.) | M | M | M |
| Simon Fitzgerald | Richard Norton | | | | R | M | M | | |
| Greg Marshall | Ross Newton | | | | R | M | M | M | M |
| Sam Marshall | Ryan Clark | R | R | R | R | M | M | M | M |
| Lucinda Croft | Dee Smart | | R | R | R | M | M | M | |
| Damian Roberts | Matt Doran | | | | | G | R | M | M |
| Shane Parrish | Dieter Brummer | | | | | | R | M | M |

== Josh Webb ==
Josh Webb
- Home and Away character
- Portrayed by: Erik Mitsak
- Duration: 1991–1992
- First appearance: 7 February 1991
- Last appearance: 7 January 1992
- Introduced by: Des Monaghan
In-universe information
- Mother: Gerry Webb
- Sisters: Rachel Webb

Josh Webb, played by Erik Mitsak, made his first appearance on 7 February 1991. The character becomes Home and Away's "nasty-in-residence". He is a "jailbird" out on bail and trying to go straight. Garry Shelley of TV Week commented that Josh was "not making much of a go of it." Many of Mitsak's previous roles led him to play "young thugs", and he joked "I've been beating up people so often in shows that for a while I thought 'Maybe I am a thug'." In The Official Home and Away Annual, John Kercher said that the character is "about as bad as they come". But Josh is "fortunate to have the type of angelic looks that make people forgive him". He has a backstory featuring a life of crime – stealing vehicles and making money by any means possible. Josh is a "rapid talker and very street wise" which meant that he could always outsmart the law. Josh had always used his mother Gerry (Julie Godfrey) because he knew how to "wrap her around his little finger". He loves her but creates a pretence for her and "frequently lies" to get what he wants. She does not want him to leave her, so she believes anything that he says. But this leaves Josh free to take advantage of the predicament. Shelley reported that Mitsak would leave Home and Away in early 1992 in "an open-ended exit". Mitsak said that his departure was not "grand" and that it would take place off-screen.

Josh is Rachel Webb's (Beth Champion) older brother. He befriends her boyfriend Blake Dean (Les Hill) and invites him, his sister Karen (Belinda Jarrett) and their friends Haydn Ross (Andrew Hill) and Sophie Simpson (Rebekah Elmaloglou) to a party at his place. The party turns into a drugs bust when Sgt. Chris Hale (John Meillon Jr.) arrives. When Josh learns of Blake and Rachel's romance, he hits Blake. Adam Cameron (Mat Stevenson) acts as a decoy to date Rachel but Josh sees through this plan and attacks Blake at the Bayside diner the next day, prompting Adam to intervene and punch Josh. As a measure of revenge, Josh frames Adam for the theft of Summer Bay High's raffle money. However, he is later exposed as the real culprit and jailed.

After being released, Josh puts on an act of having changed his ways and invites Blake and Adam on a camping trip but little do they know he is planning to kill them both. Blake and Adam quickly realise what Josh is up to and foil his murder attempt and he is arrested and sent back to prison.

== Cynthia Ross ==
Cynthia Ross, played by Belinda Giblin, made her first appearance during the episode broadcast on 11 February 1991. Giblin's casting and Cynthia's character details were publicised in the 29 December 1990 issue of TV Week. Cynthia is introduced as the mother of Haydn Ross (Andrew Hill) and the ex-wife of Michael Ross (Dennis Coard). A TV Week writer revealed that Cynthia would "turn up in Summer Bay to wreak havoc", creating problems for Michael's relationship with Pippa Fletcher (Debra Lawrence). Cynthia last appeared in the episode broadcast on 6 March 1991.

Cynthia is the ex-wife of Michael and the mother of their children Haydn and Kate. She arrives in Summer Bay and causes trouble between Michael and his new partner Pippa Fletcher (Debra Lawrence). Haydn schemes to reunite Michael and Cynthia but the plan fails and he runs away. After Haydn is found, Cynthia takes him back to the city with her for several weeks.

== Nick Parrish ==
Nick Parrish, played by Bruce Roberts debuted on screen during the episode airing on 4 March 1991. Roberts received the role of Nick a day after he left drama school. He quit the serial in 1994 to relocate to the UK to be with his girlfriend, Suzanne Dando. An unstamped fan letter for Roberts from a woman in the United Kingdom named "Kate" was delivered to the Network Seven studios. Roberts said that he received plenty of fan mail from the UK, but he had never had one like Kate's letter. The letter simply read "Dear Nick, We will be married next week, Kate."

== Sam Marshall ==
Sam Marshall, played by Ryan Clark debuted on screen during the episode airing on 3 April 1991. Clark was seven years old when he secured the role of Sam in 1991. He was only allowed to film Home and Away for three days a week, so he could attend school during the remaining days. Clark was provided with a tutor on set so he could keep up with his schoolwork. He left the serial in 2000 in order to pursue another career path. Clark reprised the role in 2005 alongside several past cast members to celebrate the serial's 4000th episode. Glenn Wheeler of The Morning Show opined that Sam formed a part of one of Australian television's "much loved families" for a decade. Sam was popular with the teenage female demographic, who would tune into the show daily to watch the character. MSN online's columnist opined that Clark played "one of Australia's very own '90s teen heartthrobs"

== Julie Gibson ==
Julie Gibson
- Home and Away character
- Portrayed by: Naomi Watts
- First appearance: 23 April 1991
- Last appearance: 30 May 1991
- Introduced by: Des Monaghan
In-universe information
- Father: Alec Gibson
- Brothers: Revhead

Julie Gibson, played by Naomi Watts made her first appearance on 23 April 1991. Watts's casting was publicised in TV Week on 16 March 1991. Glenn Williams from the publication reported that her character was a paraplegic. Watts said the role was different from anything she had played before and she was looking forward to working on the show. Watts spent a number of weeks using a wheelchair before she began filming. She commented "It's been the most amazing experience. People tend to react to you in such diverse ways."

Julie's storyline involves her beginning a relationship with Nick Parrish (Bruce Roberts). However, when her brother Revhead (Gavin Harrison) learns of their romance he is not happy. As Tom Etherington from TV Week reported, Revhead "didn't do anything by the book" and "his head nearly exploded" because Nick is a police officer. He "tried his best" to separate the pair but they end the relationship on their own terms. Etherington added that "it became obvious they were better suited to being just good friends". Watts later described the experience as "six miserable weeks".

Julie is in a wheelchair owing to a car accident that left her paralysed when she was younger. She dates Nick Parrish, which annoys her brother Revhead, who is overprotective of Julie and schemes to split them up. Following her father, Alec's (David Baldwyn) death due to a heart attack, Julie is distraught when Nick breaks up with her. She decides to leave the Bay to attend university in the city, which upsets Revhead, who feels Julie will struggle, but she assures him she can make it on her own and leaves.

== Lucinda Croft ==
Lucinda "Lou" Croft, played by Dee Smart, debuted on screen on 13 June 1991 and departed in 1992. Smart had been studying drama in Sydney for three years when she secured the role of Lucinda. It was Smart's first ever acting role. and she signed a contract to remain with the series for two years. However, Smart quit after 8 months into her contract. Mary Fletcher of Inside Soap said that Smart helped make Lucinda one of Home and Away's most popular characters.

== David Croft ==
David Croft
- Home and Away character
- Portrayed by: Guy Pearce
- First appearance: 19 July 1991
- Last appearance: 21 August 1991
- Introduced by: Des Monaghan
In-universe information
- Mother: Mary Croft
- Sisters: Lucinda Croft
- Daughters: Tamara Simpson
- Grandmothers: Isobel DuPre
- Uncles: Donald Fisher; Clive Fisher
- First cousins: Bobby Simpson; Alan Fisher; Rebecca Nash; Byron Fisher

David Croft, played by Guy Pearce, made his first on-screen appearance on 19 July 1991. Pearce began filming in May 1991 and David introduced as the nephew of Donald Fisher (Norman Coburn) and brother to Lucinda (Dee Smart). David made his last appearance on 21 August 1991.

Pearce's role with the serial lasted just six weeks. In The official Home and Away Annual John Kercher explained David arrives to see his "estranged" sister Lucinda because he wants to attempt to "patch things up" with her. But he soon finds a new reason to stay in the form of Sophie Simpson (Rebekah Elmaloglou). Pearce told Kercher that "it all starts by Sophie having a crush on me [David], she decides that i'm too old, but then we do get together and that's where the trouble starts..."

David arrives in Summer Bay to visit his uncle, Donald and meets his estranged sister Lucinda who is frosty with him due to a falling out they had when they were younger due to David's investment idea failing and resulting in their parents losing their home. Donald plays referee between the two siblings and they later reconcile. Sophie is attracted to David and he feels the same way about her. They begin a relationship but it is revealed and Donald and Sophie's foster parents Michael (Dennis Coard) and Pippa Ross (Debra Lawrence) express their disapproval with the relationship as David is much older than Sophie. Pippa then makes a deal with Sophie, If she still feels the same about David after two weeks away at Pippa's mother, Coral King's (Jessica Noad) house, She and Michael will leave the couple alone. David decides to leave on a trip of his own too but he and Sophie agree to meet up when they return. The couple part after Sophie gives David a taped message to play.

That night, David sets off in his car on Yabbie Creek road, listening to the tape. Karen Dean (Belinda Jarrett) and Adam Cameron (Mat Stevenson) arrive in an oncoming car and there is a head-on collision which David tries to avoid but he is killed instantly. When Sophie returns from Coral's, she is devastated to learn of David's death and is shocked to learn Karen is responsible. She is initially angry at Pippa and Michael for sending her away but calms down. Sophie then discovers she is pregnant with David's baby and later gives birth to a daughter, Tamara (Emily and Chloe Hutton). Sophie then moves to Perth near David's mother Mary (Jan Kingsbury). Sophie has another child in 2003 and names him after David.

Barbara Toner, a writer for the Sydney Morning Herald expressed her disappointment in David's storyline with Sophie. She opined: "Guy Pearce, fresh from his film career, has turned up as a nasty, but his storyline was even less fascinating than whatever is going on between hard man-on-the-run Revhead and personality girl Karen. Theirs could have been a goer but they seem to have underlined the wrong words on their scripts so I'm afraid I gave up on them."

Channel 5 chose the episode where David is killed in a car crash with Adam Cameron and Karen Dean as one of their "favourite ever Home and Away episodes".

== Ryan Lee ==
Ryan Lee, portrayed by Alistair MacDougall, made his first on-screen appearance on 22 August 1991 and made his last appearance on 27 November 1992. After MacDougall's departure he told Josephine Monroe from Inside Soap that because he loved playing Ryan, he would go back for a cameo appearance as long as the scriptwriters made his character bad. and added "I would have stayed longer before if the scripts had been good enough." Another Inside Soap writer branded Ryan a "rich, ratbag".

== Finlay Roberts ==
Finlay Roberts, played by Tina Thomsen, made her first appearance on 18 September 1991 and remained in the serial until 1994. Thomsen returned to guest star in 1996 and 1997. Thomsen was still a teenager when she relocated from Brisbane to Sydney with her family after winning the role of Finlay. In an interview with Jenna Price of the Sydney Morning Herald, Thomsen described her parents as not pushy and said "It's me who did the pushing ... my parents just supported me."

== Greg Marshall ==
Greg Marshall, portrayed by Ross Newton, made his first on-screen appearance on 20 September 1991. Newton departed the show in 1993, before making a brief return in 2000. Newton told Glenn Wheeler of The Morning Show that joining the cast of Home and Away "was a wonderful opportunity because it was in its early stages of being a success story as a show". Wheeler opined that Greg formed a part of one of Australian television's "much loved families".

== Simon Fitzgerald ==
Simon Fitzgerald, portrayed by Richard Norton, made his first appearance during the episode airing on 25 September 1991 and departed on 24 July 1992. Norton had finished a year-long stint on rival soap opera Neighbours before joining Home and Away. Brendon Williams writing for the Daily Mirror said that Norton proved to be "a big hit" as Simon.

== Irene Roberts ==
Irene Roberts made her first appearance on 29 October, played by Jacqui Phillips, Lynne McGranger later took the role. For McGranger's portrayal of Irene, she was nominated in the category of "Funniest Performance" at the 2007 Inside Soap Awards. The Sydney Morning Herald have referred to Irene as one of the serial's three "legacy characters", along with Alf and Colleen. Holy Soap recall Irene's most memorable moment as being: "Being attacked by the mad ex-wife of her former lover Ken."

== Damian Roberts ==
Damian Roberts, played by Matt Doran, debuted on-screen during the episode airing on 6 November 1991. Doran became a regular in 1992 and remained in the serial until 1995. He continued to guest star until 1996. Ben Hamilton played a young Damian in flashbacks in 1997. On one of his returns, Jason Herbison from Inside Soap Damian had "thrown off his clean cut image" by having his hair in dreadlocks. A reporter from BIG! wrote that through playing Damian, Doran had become "one of the world's most popular soap stars" and gained many "girl fans" who "adored him". A columnist from Shout said that "poor old Damian" filled his on-screen time with a hobby of jogging but there was "no sign of a girlie". They said that the character need a relationship storyline, adding "when will Matt Doran finally get to have a major on-screen smooch, that's what were asking". A writer from Inside Soap opined that the character "is always going to be a loser".

== Others ==
| Date(s) | Character | Actor | Circumstances |
|---|---|---|---|
| 15–16 January | Jack Cody | Colin Taylor | Jack and Helen are potential buyers for the Beach House when Ernie Jacobs (David Weatherley) sells the property. They opt out after learning Ernie has conned Marilyn Chambers (Emily Symons) out of her money and once they learn the amount of maintenance the house needs. |
| 15–16 January | Helen Cody | Jan Adele | Jack and Helen are potential buyers for the Beach House when Ernie Jacobs (David Weatherley) sells the property. They opt out after learning Ernie has conned Marilyn Chambers (Emily Symons) out of her money and once they learn the amount of maintenance the house needs. |
| 16 January | Peter | Scott Kelly | Peter is a friend of Pippa Fletcher (Debra Lawrence) who initially agrees to buy Floss (Sheila Kennelly) and Neville McPhee's (Frank Lloyd) old gypsy caravan for his children's home. When Pippa and Michael Ross (Dennis Coard) bring the van to Peter, he tells them it is not what he is looking for. |
| 21 January | Jake Wood | Frankie Davidson | Jake is a neighbour of Pippa Fletcher (Debra Lawrence) who expresses an interest in Floss (Sheila Kennelly) and Neville McPhee's (Frank Lloyd) old gypsy caravan. Ben Lucini (Julian McMahon) attempts to sell Jake the van for $100 but ends up with a goat in exchange much to Pippa's annoyance. |
| 22 January | Postmaster Bagley | Ron Gaist | Bagley is present when Steven Matheson (Adam Willits) and Marilyn Chambers (Emily Symons) arrive at the post office with several other Year 12 classmates to collect their HSC results . Bagley hands out the results in alphabetical order and both Steven and Marilyn discover they have both passed. |
| 30 January–7 April 1993 | Louise Scott | Elaine Hudson | Louise is a member of the foster department who Bobby Simpson (Nicolle Dickson) contacts about fostering a child. After Bobby is rejected at first, Louise tells her that she will be eligible to foster and her first case is Sam Nicholls (Ryan Clark). After Sam is returned to his mother Jacqui, Bobby is upset but they are reunited following Jacqui's relapse into neglect. Louise is present when Sam's estranged father Greg Marshall (Ross Newton) battles Bobby for custody. She also asks Pippa Debra Lawrence) and Michael Ross (Dennis Coard) if they will foster Tracey Turner (Tania Martin) and later helps Angel Brooks (Melissa George) find a home. |
| 4 February-28 March | Tony Clark | Rob Hunter | Tony is an Estate Agent who handles the sale of the Stewart store. |
| 6 February–17 April | Rachel Webb | Beth Champion | Rachel begins dating Blake Dean (Les Hill). Their relationship is put to the test when Rachel's brother Josh (Erik Mitsak) tries to involve Blake in his illegal activities. Josh is later arrested for theft and their mother Gerry (Julie Godfrey) moves away. After Blake leads his friends to believe that he spent the night with Rachel in her caravan, She decides to leave Summer Bay and leaves behind a letter for Blake, leaving him heartbroken. |
| 8–27 February | Roy Jackson | Fredric Abbott | Roy is a local farmer who leases his farm to Ben (Julian McMahon) and Carly Lucini (Sharyn Hodgson). |
| 8–14 February | Betty Jackson | Marie Armstrong | Betty is Roy's (Fredric Abbott) wife. She persuades Carly Lucini (Sharyn Hodgson) to give running the farm a try after her husband Ben (Julian McMahon) expresses an interest. |
| 8 March–8 April | Gerry Webb | Julie Godfrey | Gerry is the mother of Josh (Erik Mitsak) and Rachel (Beth Champion). She disapproves of Rachel's relationship with Blake Dean (Les Hill). Shortly after Josh is arrested She and Rachel move away. |
| 19 March–3 May | Mark Smith | Greg Hatton | Mark is a member of Summer Bay High's swim team. He has a brief relationship with Karen Dean (Belinda Jarrett) |
| 27 March–13 May | Rodney White | Lester Morris | Rodney is the headmaster of Yabbie Creek High. He and his wife Val (May Howlett) arrive at his arch-rival Donald Fisher's (Norman Coburn) house to play a game of bridge with him and his daughter Bobby Simpson (Nicolle Dickson). Rodney later attends a teacher's conference at a hotel in with Donald and is amused when Janice, a prostitute is sent to Donald's room by Adam Cameron (Mat Stevenson) and Blake Dean (Les Hill) as a practical joke. He mocks and taunts Donald over the swimming carnival between their schools but is left speechless when Summer Bay win. |
| 27 March | Val White | May Howlett | Val is Rodney's wife. She becomes annoyed with him during a bridge game at Donald Fisher's (Norman Coburn) home when he is visibly distracted by Marilyn Chambers (Emily Symons) and they begin losing. |
| 11 April–18 July | Jackie Nicholls | Erica Williams | Jackie is the mother of Sam Nicholls (Ryan Clark). She struggles to look after her son on her own and as a result he is fostered by Bobby Simpson (Nicolle Dickson). Jackie returns to collect Sam and he leaves with her but within several weeks Jackie is unable to cope and she agrees to allow Bobby to foster Sam after he runs away and is lost for several nights in the bush. |
| 18 April | Vet | Michael Beckley | A Vet who visits Ben (Julian McMahon) and Carly Lucini (Sharyn Hodgson) on their farm when several of their chickens are found dead. He tells them Fowl cholera is a possible cause. |
| 22 April | Smart Alec no.1 | Adam Garcia | A member of Yabbie Creek High's Swim team who taunts Haydn Ross (Andrew Hill) over his diving. |
| 30 April | Celebrant | Carmel Mullin | A celebrant who conducts the wedding of Michael Ross (Dennis Coard) and Pippa Fletcher (Debra Lawrence) at Summer Bay House. |
| 30 April–1 May | Military Police | Leo Taylor; Timothy Sullivan | Two military police officers who arrive at Summer Bay House during Michael (Dennis Coard) and Pippa Ross' (Debra Lawrence) wedding reception to arrest Ben Lucini (Julian McMahon) for going AWOL. Ben's charges are later dropped. |
| 8–21 May | Alec Gibson | David Baldwyn | Alec is the father of Revhead (Gavin Harrison) and Julie (Naomi Watts). He approves of Julie making friends with Nick Parrish (Bruce Roberts) but Alec later suffers a heart attack and dies. |
| 10–24 May | Jean Chambers | Maggie Kirkpatrick | Jean is Marilyn Chambers's (Emily Symons) aunt. She comes to stay with her at the beach house and manages to irritate Bobby Simpson (Nicolle Dickson) with high standards of cleanliness and her attitude towards her fostering Sam Nicholls (Ryan Clark). She causes further problems when she fakes a back injury in order to get Sam's room. Jean eventually leaves but discloses the whereabouts of Marilyn's biological parents, prompting her to search for them. |
| 22 May–21 June | Kenny Gibbs | David Field | Kenny is the janitor of Summer Bay High who sells Blake Dean (Les Hill) and Haydn Ross (Andrew Hill) his old, broken-down Morris Minor. |
| 20 June–3 July | Max Riley | Bruce Venables | Max and Heather are a couple who Marilyn Chambers (Emily Symons) believes to be her biological parents. They form a bond with Marilyn but leave after Marilyn's real parents George (Doug Scroope) and Heather Davison (Lynne Rainbow) arrive with proof that she is their daughter. |
| 20 June–3 July | Heather Riley | Lynne Porteous | Max and Heather are a couple who Marilyn Chambers (Emily Symons) believes to be her biological parents. They form a bond with Marilyn but leave after Marilyn's real parents George (Doug Scroope) and Heather Davison (Lynne Rainbow) arrive with proof that she is their daughter. |
| 5 June–11 July | Margaret Lynch | Gennie Nevinson | Margaret begins teaching Year 11 personal development classes at Summer Bay High. On her first day in Summer Bay, Nick Parrish (Bruce Roberts) pulls over for speeding. She generally looks down on the town. Margaret forms a fixation on Sophie Simpson (Rebekah Elmaloglou) who is suspicious. It is revealed that Margaret had a daughter, Kelly who died, and Sophie resembles her. Margaret soon leaves the bay. |
| 5 June | Mrs Clifton | Marianne Krogdahl | Mrs Clifton and her son Stanley are seen at the grave of her late husband, Max. Marilyn Chambers, who is searching for her parents assumes Mrs. Clifton is her mother, and Stanley is her brother. Mrs. Clifton tells Marilyn she has the wrong people, devastating her. |
| 5 June | Stanley Clifton | Brett Caroll | Mrs Clifton and her son Stanley are seen at the grave of her late husband, Max. Marilyn Chambers, who is searching for her parents assumes Mrs. Clifton is her mother, and Stanley is her brother. Mrs. Clifton tells Marilyn she has the wrong people, devastating her. |
| 7 June–10 July | Tracey Turner | Tania Martin | Tracey is fostered by Pippa (Debra Lawrence) and Michael Ross (Dennis Coard) and begins feuding with Sophie Simpson (Rebekah Elmaloglou) and generally making her life a misery. Sophie tries to warn everybody about Tracey but her words fall on deaf ears. The girls' problems culminate in a fight in their bedroom where Sophie injures Tracey. After Sophie records Tracey into gloating about getting her into trouble and plays the recording to Michael and Pippa, she then decides to leave and is transferred to a new home. |
| 2–3 July | George Davidson | Doug Scroope | George and Heather are Marilyn Chambers' (Emily Symons) biological parents. They are travelling performers who put Marilyn in a home to further their careers. Marilyn spends the day with them only to regret it when they take advantage of her nature by ordering a lot of food at the diner. The final straw comes when Marilyn realises they are using her when they ask to borrow some money and she orders them to leave. |
| 2–3 July | Heather Davidson | Lynne Rainbow | George and Heather are Marilyn Chambers' (Emily Symons) biological parents. They are travelling performers who put Marilyn in a home to further their careers. Marilyn spends the day with them only to regret it when they take advantage of her nature by ordering a lot of food at the diner. The final straw comes when Marilyn realises they are using her when they ask to borrow some money and she orders them to leave. |
| 23 July–14 August | Diane Robertson | Hanna McLeod | Diane is a classmate of Sally Fletcher (Kate Ritchie), she attends Sally's unsupervised 12th birthday party at Summer Bay House. She and Sally both compete for the affections of Peter Mansell (Troy O'Hearn). Sally is irritated when Diane joins the Nippers along with Peter and Sally. Sally and Diane continue bickering much to the irritation of their coach Adam Cameron (Mat Stevenson), who pits them against each other in race, which Diane wins by cheating. However, Peter agrees to a dinner date at Summer Bay House. |
| 23 July–16 August | Peter Mansell | Troy O'Hearn | Peter is a boy in Sally Fletcher's (Kate Ritchie) class whom she has a crush on. Sally invites him to her unsupervised 12th birthday party at Summer Bay House and kisses him during a game of Spin the bottle. Sally often has to compete with Diane Robertson (Hanna Macleod) for Peter's attention and they both join the Nippers. in an attempt to get closer to him. Sally invites Peter to dinner and he accepts but the evening is a failure when Peter criticizes Pippa Ross' (Debra Lawrence) cooking and the begins boasting about his family's activities. Sally has enough and tells Peter to leave. |
| 30 July–21 August | Constable Rogers | Dominic Purcell | Rogers is a police colleague of Nick Parrish (Bruce Roberts), he helps Nick capture Revhead (Gavin Harrison) and later attends to the scene of a car crash on Yabbie Creek Road involving Karen Dean (Belinda Jarrett), Adam Cameron (Mat Stevenson) and David Croft (Guy Pearce). Rogers phones for an ambulance but David dies at the scene. |
| 2 August–2 October | Martin Bradley | John Bonney | Bradley is the head of the education department administering Summer Bay High. He lines up Lois Crawford (Tina Bursill) to replace Donald Fisher (Norman Coburn) as Head Teacher. He returns when Lois is investigated for allegedly assaulting Finlay Roberts (Tina Thomsen). Although Lois is cleared after Finlay is discovered to be lying, Bradley suggests she leaves before he is forced to terminate her employment. |
| 9 August–2 October | Lois Crawford | Tina Bursill | Lois is appointed by Martin Bradley (John Bonney) to replace Donald Fisher (Norman Coburn) as Head Teacher of Summer Bay High. She sets about making her changes at the school by coming down hard on Blake Dean (Les Hill) and Haydn Ross (Andrew Hill). Her methods do not sit well with Donald, who has been demoted to Lois' deputy and teaching the junior half of the school. After Donald considers resigning, Lois offers Grant Mitchell (Craig McLachlan) his position. Pippa Ross (Debra Lawrence), Donald's daughter Bobby Simpson (Nicolle Dickson) and several other residents of Summer Bay rally against Lois at a heated town meeting. After Finlay Roberts (Tina Thomsen) is denied enrollment at the school due to an incident at her previous school, she fabricates a lie that Lois hit her. The lie is exposed but Bradley suggests Lois resigns before she is fired and she leaves Summer Bay. |
| 11–12 September | Isabelle Britton | Collette Roberts | Isabelle is a police officer from Mangrove River who Nick Parrish (Bruce Roberts) briefly dates in order to make Lucinda Croft (Dee Smart) jealous. They go on a date and end up at the same restaurant as Lou and her fiancé, Ryan Lee (Alistair MacDougall). Isabelle is keen on Nick but he is still in love with Lou. |
| 3–9 October | Sharyn McKinley | Liza Witt | Sharyn and Annette are two girls in Year 11 at Summer Bay High who Blake Dean (Les Hill) and Simon Fitzgerald (Richard Norton) show an interest in. They invite the girls over to Blake's place while his guardians Alf (Ray Meagher) and Ailsa Stewart (Judy Nunn) are away. The girls quickly work out the Boys' intentions to seduce them and Sharyn plants her bra down the back of the sofa and they leave. When Alf and Ailsa return they find the bra and Blake is grounded for two weeks. Simon then threatens to spread rumours around school about the girls' reputations unless they confess to the Stewarts, which they eventually do. |
| 3–9 October | Annette Hodges | Kylle Hogart | |
| 6–28 November | Bill Fitzgerald | Terry Bader | Bill is Simon Fitzgerald's (Richard Norton) father. He arranges a business deal with Alf (Ray Meagher) and Ailsa Stewart (Judy Nunn). Simon warns them about Bill's history of dodgy deals and Bill hits him as a result. When Bill decides to leave town after being exposed, he wants Simon to come with him but he decides to stay with the Stewarts and Bill leaves alone. Several months later, Bill is imprisoned for fraud. When he is paroled, he sends a letter to Simon asking him for another chance and to join him, which he accepts. |
| 14 November | Ian Gardiner | Andrew S. Gilbert | The Gardiners are a family with domestic problems who constable Nick Parrish (Bruce Roberts) attends to. Elaine is a customer of the Caravan Park with her daughter, Susie in order to escape her violent husband, Ian. When Donald Fisher (Norman Coburn) intervenes, Ian punches him in the nose. |
| 14 November | Elaine Gardiner | Lisabeth Kennely | The Gardiners are a family with domestic problems who constable Nick Parrish (Bruce Roberts) attends to. Elaine is a customer of the Caravan Park with her daughter, Susie in order to escape her violent husband, Ian. When Donald Fisher (Norman Coburn) intervenes, Ian punches him in the nose. |
| 14 November | Susie Gardiner | Lauren Snell | The Gardiners are a family with domestic problems who constable Nick Parrish (Bruce Roberts) attends to. Elaine is a customer of the Caravan Park with her daughter, Susie in order to escape her violent husband, Ian. When Donald Fisher (Norman Coburn) intervenes, Ian punches him in the nose. |
| 19 November–19 June 1992 | Ruth Winston | Anna Phillips | Winston is a local doctor who Pippa Ross (Debra Lawrence) takes Sophie Simpson (Rebekah Elmaloglou) to visit when she begins feeling unwell. During the visit, Winston discovers Sophie is pregnant and urges her to tell Pippa, which she refuses to do so. Winston visits Sophie when she begins experiencing pains and is later present when Sophie goes into labour and gives birth to a daughter, Tamara (Emma & Chloe Hutton). |
