= List of Home and Away characters introduced in 1994 =

Home and Away is an Australian television soap opera. It was first broadcast on the Seven Network on 17 January 1988. The following is a list of characters that first appeared during 1994, by order of first appearance. They were all introduced by the show's executive producer Andrew Howie. The 7th season of Home and Away began airing on 10 January 1994. The first introduction of the year was Dylan Harris, the son of established character Angel Brooks. Daniel Amalm and Toni Pearen were introduced in April as Jack Wilson and Beth Armstrong, respectively. Tempany Deckert joined the cast as Selina Cook the following month. Matthew Lilley and Eva Matiuk began playing Rob Storey and Sonia Johnson in July, respectively. Isla Fisher and Shane Ammann arrived as Shannon and Curtis Reed in September. Nicola Quilter began appearing as Donna Bishop in November.

== Opening titles timeline ==
Color key
Main cast (opening credits)
Recurring guest star (closing credits in 3+ episodes)
Guest star (closing credits in 1–2 episodes)

Character	Actor	1994					
Character	Actor	1376–1470	1471–1490	1491–1520	1521–1548	1549–1585	1586–1605
Pippa Fletcher	Debra Lawrence	M	M	M	M	M	M
Sally Fletcher	Kate Ritchie	M	M	M	M	M	M
Ailsa Stewart	Judy Nunn	M	M	M	M	M	M
Alf Stewart	Ray Meagher	M	M	M	M	M	M
Donald Fisher	Norman Coburn	M	M	M	M	M	M
Michael Ross	Dennis Coard	M	M	M	M	M	M
Nick Parrish	Bruce Roberts	M	M				
Finlay Roberts	Tina Thomsen	M					
Sam Marshall	Ryan Clark	M	M	M	M	M	M
Damian Roberts	Matt Doran	M	M	M	M	M	M
Shane Parrish	Dieter Brummer	M	M	M	M	M	M
Luke Cunningham	John Adam	M	M	M			
Roxy Miller	Lisa Lackey	M	M	M	M	M	M
Tug O'Neale	Tristan Bancks	M	M	M	M		
Sarah Thompson	Laura Vasquez	M	M	M	M	M	
Angel Brooks	Melissa George	M	M	M	M	M	M
Irene Roberts	Lynne McGranger	M	M	M	M	M	M
Jack Wilson	Daniel Amalm	R	M	M	M	M	M
Rob Storey	Matthew Lilley				R	M	M
Curtis Reed	Shane Ammann					R	M
Shannon Reed	Isla Fisher					R	M

== Dylan Parrish ==
Dylan Parrish
- Home and Away character
- Portrayed by: Jimmy Lucini (1994); Jay Patterson (1994); Corey Glaister (1995–96)
- Duration: 1994–96
- First appearance: 1 February 1994
- Last appearance: 30 August 1996
- Introduced by: Andrew Howie
In-universe information
- Father: Paul Harris
- Mother: Angel Parrish
- Stepfather: Shane Parrish
- Half-sisters: Shane Parrish Jr.
- Grandfathers: Raymond Brooks
- Grandmothers: Anne Harris; Sarah Brooks
- Aunts: Frankie Brooks

Dylan Parrish (né Harris) made his first appearance on 1 February 1994. Jimmy Lucini originated the role and Jay Patterson later took over. Corey Glaister played Dylan from 1995 until his departure in 1996.

After Paul Harris (Ramsay Everingham), loses custody of Dylan to his mother, Angel Brooks (Melissa George), and Shane Parrish (Dieter Brummer), he decides to hold his son hostage. Dylan is found and taken to the doctor for a routine check-up, he is then diagnosed with leukaemia. George stated "Angel is totally freaked out when she gets Dylan's test results back. Shane comforts her and tells her it's going to be fine." The situation makes Shane realise that Dylan feels like a real son to him. Brummer praised Dylan's portrayer Glaister and called him "good fun" to work with.

Dylan is the son of Angel Brooks and Paul Harris. He was born when Angel was fourteen and raised by his grandmother Anne (Fay Kelton) when Angel gave up custody. Angel tracks Dylan down when he is three years old much to Anne's chagrin. She tells him she is his mother but he refuses to believe her, devastating Angel. Anne eventually relents and lets Angel have access and have Dylan for the odd weekend. Angel's boyfriend Shane Parrish struggles to connect with Dylan at first but soon grows to love him. During his visit, Dylan accidentally spills orange juice all over Donald Fisher's (Norman Coburn) last remaining photos of his late daughter, Bobby Marshall (Nicolle Dickson), leaving Donald upset. On Dylan's next visit to the bay, he locks himself in Donald's car while Shane and Damian Roberts (Matt Doran) babysit him. Several months later, Shane and Angel decide to battle Anne and Paul for custody of Dylan. During this time, he realises that Angel his mother and begins calling her "Mummy". Shane and Angel win custody of Dylan after Paul withdraws due to Anne's attitude towards Angel.

Paul resurfaces several months later and begins a hate campaign against Angel and attempts to kidnap Dylan, but is foiled by Shannon Reed (Isla Fisher). Dylan develops a temperature and begins feeling tired. He is later diagnosed with leukemia and Angel is worried it may be terminal and begins shutting everybody out. Dylan is then christened with Damian and Marilyn Chambers (Emily Symons) as his godparents. Angel contemplates having another child with Paul as a saviour sibling for Dylan. Dylan's leukaemia later goes into remission and Angel discovers she is pregnant with Shane's baby. Prior to a family holiday, Shane collapses and dies while on a day out at the headland leaving Angel and Dylan devastated. Angel later gives birth to a daughter, who she names after Shane. Following an Earthquake, the Parrishes are left homeless and are invited to live with Pippa Ross (Debra Lawrence). Simon Broadhurst (Julian Garner) takes an interest in Angel and asks her to marry him and she accepts. They all leave Summer Bay after a big farewell from all their friends. Dylan asks Angel if they have beaches in England and she tells him yes, but not like the one in Summer Bay.

== Jack Wilson ==
Jack Wilson, played by Daniel Amalm, made his first appearance on 1 April 1994. Jack was introduced as a new foster child for the characters of Michael (Dennis Coard) and Pippa Ross (Debra Lawrence). Amalm was picked to play Jack from thousands of young actors, despite not being on the list to audition. Amalm was a busker with no acting experience, but he impressed producers so much with his performance that he was given the role of Jack. In 1996, Amalm left the serial to pursue other projects. Amalm told a reporter from Inside Soap that he was bored of doing monotonous work which was not "his thing". He added that it was too time-consuming and wanted to concentrate more on his music. In 2000, Amalm returned to Home and Away; Jack featured in episodes centred around Sally Fletcher's (Kate Ritchie) wedding to Kieran Fletcher (Spencer McLaren). For his portrayal of Jack, Amalm received a nomination for "Most Popular New Talent" at the 1995 Logie Awards. The episode featuring the Summer Bay bushfire caused by Jack was nominated for the Avid Technology Award for "Best Episode in a Television Drama Serial" at the 1996 Australian Film Institute Awards.

== Beth Armstrong ==
Beth Armstrong
- Home and Away character
- Portrayed by: Toni Pearen
- First appearance: 25 April 1994
- Last appearance: 10 June 1994
- Introduced by: Andrew Howie
In-universe information
- Occupation: Teacher

Beth Armstrong, played by Toni Pearen, made her first appearance on 25 April 1994. The character and Pearen's casting was confirmed by Di Stanley in the 12 February 1994 issue of TV Week. Sue Williams of The Sun-Herald reported that the role would last for eight weeks. Beth is a high school teacher. Stanley said that her stint in Summer Bay would be "a steamy one" when her student Tug O'Neale (Tristan Bancks) develops a serious crush on her. In January 2021, Pearen reminisced about her time on Home and Away and pitched a return storyline for her character. She told Helen Vnuk of TV Week: "Her affair with student Tug [Tristan Bancks] was very illicit, so she was banished. But wouldn't it be nice to see her come back, and she's had this crooked past and she ends up in Summer Bay to redeem herself... with Tug's child? Now there's a plot twist!"

Beth comes to Summer Bay to privately tutor Tug O'Neale when he returns to school after a difficult time, in order to beat his dyslexia. Tug is immediately attracted to her. Beth's colleague Luke Cunningham (John Adam) introduces her to Nick Parrish (Bruce Roberts). Beth and Nick get along well but disaster strikes when Beth crashes her car into Nick's from behind, causing their fenders to lock. Nick is able to pry the cars apart at the expense of Alf Stewart's (Ray Meagher) putter. Beth and Nick's paths cross once again when Nick attends yoga classes held at the school in order to help with his headaches. Tug asks Beth for further tutorials, but refuses to pay if charged and is too proud to accept if the lessons are free. Beth comes up with a solution; Tug teaching her to swim in exchange for the tutorials and he agrees.

Beth is impressed when Tug dives into the sea to save some kittens from being drowned. Beth learns of Tug's feelings from Luke and tells Tug she is his teacher and nothing more. Beth confides in Roxy Miller (Lisa Lackey) about Tug's feelings and Donald Fisher (Norman Coburn) advises Beth to cease teaching Tug. Beth, however, decides to continue as the HSC trials are nearing. After Tug receives a six-month suspended sentence for stealing Roxy's car, he arrives at Beth's flat to tell her and in the excitement he kisses her and she reciprocates. Beth regrets the kiss and tells Tug she will not jeopardise her career over an affair with a student leaving him devastated. When Tug sees Beth with Nick, he accuses him of dating her and reveals he is in love with Beth. This is too much for Beth who resigns from the school and bids Tug farewell, but does not tell him where she is going.

== Selina Roberts ==
Selina Roberts, played by Tempany Deckert. She debuted on-screen during the episode airing on 5 May. Deckert was given the role of Selina after her third audition for the show. In 1996, Deckert fell ill and Louise Crawford played Selina in her absence. . In 1997, Deckert decided to leave the serial, however briefly returned in 1998 for an episode filmed in Ironbridge, Shropshire, as part of the serial's first ever overseas location filming. Upon her arrival, Selina was described as being a tearaway with an attitude. For her portrayal of Selina, Deckert was nominated for "Most Popular Actress" at the 1997 Logie Awards. The Newcastle Herald included the 1998 episode of Home and Away, in which Selina and Steven returned in their "TV Highlights" feature.

== Rob Storey ==
Rob Storey, played by Matthew Lilley, first appeared on 13 July 1994 and departed on 12 May 1995. Lilley played the role for a year. Three years after he left the series; Lilley said he still received fan mail from European viewers. A writer from All About Soap said that Rob and Roxy were "the perfect couple".

== Sonia Johnson ==
Sonia Johnson
- Home and Away character
- Portrayed by: Eva Matiuk
- First appearance: 25 July 1994
- Last appearance: 21 September 1994
- Introduced by: Andrew Howie
In-universe information
- Occupation: Student

Sonia Johnson, played by Eva Matiuk, made her first screen appearance on 25 July 1994. Matiuk was a model for several years before she joined the cast of Home and Away as Sonia. Matiuk was three years older than her character. She told Jason Herbison from Inside Soap that Sonia was "no shrinking violet" and called her "a sassy 16-year-old who's out to have a good time! She'll do anything to get what she wants." While dealing with his heart break over a failed relationship, Tug O'Neale (Tristan Bancks) met Sonia. Herbison said that Tug's luck with women was set to change with the student, who put "a spring in his step". Sonia asked Tug out and they had a fling, which put Jack Wilson's (Daniel Amalm) "nose out of joint" because he liked her too. Sonia then became stuck in a love triangle.

Sonia is a student who Tug O'Neale briefly dates. However, Sonia falls for Jack Wilson and breaks up with Tug for him. It soon emerges that Jack is also seeing Selina Cook (Tempany Deckert) and Frankie Brooks (Lenka Kripac). The girls take revenge on Jack for three-timing them by luring him to a caravan and stripping him to his boxers, humiliating him.

Herbison called Sonia a "blonde bombshell" and thought she had the men of Summer Bay "going gaga".

== Shannon Reed ==
Shannon Reed played by Isla Fisher. She made her first on screen appearance on 16 September 1994. She departed on 6 August 1997. Ashley Murray played a young Shannon in flashbacks. Fisher joined the cast of Home and Away in 1994, shortly after completing her role on Paradise Beach, along with co-star Shane Ammann to play the respective roles of Shannon and Curtis Reed. In 1997, Fisher announced she had quit the serial. For her portrayal of Shannon, Fisher received a nomination for "Most Popular New Talent" at the 1995 Logie Awards. In 1997, she was earned a nomination for "Most Popular Actress".

== Curtis Reed ==
Curtis Reed, played by Shane Ammann, debuted on-screen during the episode airing on 16 September 1994 and departed on 15 April 1997.Ammann joined the cast of Home and Away in 1994, shortly after completing his role on Paradise Beach, along with co-star Isla Fisher to play the respective roles of Curtis and Shannon Reed. Ammann left the serial in 1997 at a time many other cast members decided to quit their roles. Rachel Browne of The Sun-Herald branded Curtis as "the new stud of Summer Bay High", after he romanced both Chloe and Casey.

== Donna Bishop ==
Donna Bishop, played by Nicola Quilter, debuted on-screen during the episode airing on 8 November 1994 and departed on 23 June 1995. Quilter joined the cast in 1994. Actress Kimberley Joseph also auditioned for the part of Donna, but it was Quilter who secured the role. In December 1994, Quilter fractured a bone in her foot when a wall-mounted bed fell onto it. She was given crutches to aid her mobility while it healed. Rachel Browne from The Sun-Herald reported that Quilter's accident had "thrown production schedules into disarray" because the scripts required Donna to be using her feet. The episode featuring the climax of Donna's domestic abuse at the hands of Andrew was nominated for "Best Episode in a Television Drama Serial" at the Australian Film Institute Awards in 1995.

== Others ==
Date(s)	Character	Actor	Circumstances
14–17 January	Mr. Daniels	Dan Forrester	Mr. Daniels is a Caravan Park Customer who pays a fee of $100 to Michael (Dennis Coard) and Pippa Ross (Debra Lawrence) but Damian Roberts (Matt Doran) takes the money. When Daniels returns to collect his forgotten watch, Michael tells him the transaction has not been recorded and suspects him of theft. Daniels, however tells him that he gave Damian the money.
2 February 1994–21 August 1995	Anne Harris	Fay Kelton	Anne is Dylan Harris' (Jimmy Lucini) grandmother. She refuses to let Dylan's mother, Angel Brooks (Melissa George) see Dylan when she visits him in the city. Anne later relents and agrees to let Angel see Dylan sporadically over the next few months. After Angel is left paralysed after being run over, Anne visits Angel tells her that she will never be able to a mother to Dylan. Angel defies her and fights in court for custody of Dylan. Anne's son, Paul Harris (Ramsay Everingham) tires of her interference in the case and mutually surrenders custody of Dylan to Angel and her new husband Shane Parrish (Dieter Brummer), much to Anne's upset. She appears later when Angel tells her Dylan had Leukaemia and having a baby with Paul for bone marrow.
28 February	Fireman	Ross Sharp	A Fire officer who attends the blaze at Adam Cameron's (Mat Stevenson) house.
8–16 March	Cathy	Joy Smithers	Cathy is a customer of the Bayside Diner who Damian Roberts (Matt Doran) has a crush on. Damian begins taking French lessons with Cathy and is about to tell her how he feels until her husband Reg (Alfie Lee) walks in. Angel Brooks (Melissa George) and Sarah Thompson (Laura Vasquez), who suspect Shane Parrish (Dieter Brummer) is seeing Cathy burst into the house, inadvertently saving Damian embarrassment.
16 March	Reg	Alfie Lee	Reg is Cathy's (Joy Smithers) husband. He is frequently away as he works as a trucker. In his only appearance, he appears just before Damian Roberts (Matt Doran) can confess his feelings for Cathy. When Angel Brooks (Melissa George) and Sarah Thompson (Laura Vasquez) burst into his house he is puzzled.
16 March	Heavy	Paul Reynolds	A Heavy who threatens Haydn Ross (Andrew Hill) over gambling debts.
25 March–1 April	Mrs Kelly	Sally Hudson	Mrs Kelly is an officer from the department of Childcare Services (DOCS). She asks Michael Ross and Pippa Ross (Debra Lawrence) if they will foster Jack Wilson (Daniel Amalm) and she brings Jack to them the following week.
15 April–10 June	Auctioneer	Andrew James Mead	The Auctioneer who handles the sale of the Beach House. He is hugged by Irene Roberts (Lynne McGranger) after she makes the winning bid. He also is present at the auction of Michael Ross' (Dennis Coard) boatshed, which fails to attract any bids despite a moderate crowd.
22 April	Defence Counsel	Bevan Wilson	Personnel involved in Tug O'Neale's (Tristan Bancks) trial for dangerous driving.
22 April	Magistrate	Kate Shiel	Personnel involved in Tug O'Neale's (Tristan Bancks) trial for dangerous driving.
22 April	Police Prosecutor	Benjamin Franklin	Personnel involved in Tug O'Neale's (Tristan Bancks) trial for dangerous driving.
22 April	Clerk of the Court	John Carr	Personnel involved in Tug O'Neale's (Tristan Bancks) trial for dangerous driving.
25 April	Robbie Taylor	Ryan Kwanten	Robbie is a Year 10 student who Jack Wilson (Daniel Amalm) teases when his mother Mrs Taylor fusses over him. Robbie rises to hit Jack but Donald Fisher (Norman Coburn) intervenes and gives both boys detention.
25 April	Mrs Taylor	Robyn Gurney	Mrs Taylor is the cleaner of Summer Bay High, whose son Robbie (Ryan Kwanten) is a student in Year 10.
1 June 1994–8 August 1996	Fred Archer	Robert Baxter	Fred is a retired policeman who hires Shane Parrish (Dieter Brummer) after he drops out of school. When Fred's son tells Shane to take a break, Shane does so only for Fred to fire him. Fred later joins the Surf Club committee. Fred later goes into business with Frank Zennotti (Silvio Orfia) and begins illegal waste dumping. He threatens Shannon Reed (Isla Fisher) when she begins her own investigation. Fred then holds Shannon and Jesse McGregor (Ben Unwin) hostage but he and his associates are caught by the police.
2 June	Fred Archer Jr.	Andrew Gilbert	Fred Jr. works for his father. He tells Shane Parrish (Dieter Brummer) to take a break and Shane does, only to be fired by Fred Sr.
2–13 June	Todd Bishop	Albert Goh	Todd is a classmate used by Angel Brooks (Melissa George) to make her boyfriend, Shane Parrish (Dieter Brummer) jealous. It seemingly works when they go on several dates but Angel realises she still loves Shane and breaks up with Todd.
30 June	Marty	Jade Gatt	Marty buys Steven Matheson's (Adam Willits) old bicycle from Jack Wilson (Daniel Amalm).
7–12 July	Zac	Dene Kermond	Zac is a graffiti artist who tags the wall outside of the surf club and frames Jack Wilson (Daniel Amalm) for it. Alf Stewart (Ray Meagher) refuses to believe Jack when he protests his innocence. Jack manages to catch Zac in the act and exposes him to Alf.
18 July 1994–6 July 1995	Mick O'Reilly	Peter Whitford	Mick is hired by Donald Fisher (Norman Coburn) to decorate his house. He proves to be lazy and dishonest and begins fabricating jobs in order to con more money out of Donald. Donald realises this and fires him. Mick later reappears and tries to charm Marilyn Chambers (Emily Symons), who rebuffs him. He then begins seeing Irene Roberts (Lynne McGranger) and proposes to her. Marilyn does some digging and discovers Mick is a bigamist who is still married to his first two wives Carol (Amanda Wenban) and Ingrid (Kathryn Dagher). After learning of Mick's whereabouts Carol and Ingrid arrive and confront him at the Diner. Irene then calls off the engagement.
29 August–15 September	Berta	Lucinda Armour	Berta is the coach of the Summer Bay Tigers' rival netball team. When The Tigers beat her team, Berta and the Tigers coach Irene Roberts (Lynne McGranger) get into a food fight in the diner.
9–28 September	Frankie Brooks	Lenka Kripac	Frankie is Angel Brooks' (Melissa George) younger sister. She arrives in Summer Bay to stay with Angel after running away from their parents. Frankie is attracted to Jack Wilson (Daniel Amalm) and Angel warns her about him but she does not listen and dates Jack. Frankie and Angel have a falling out but later reconcile after learning Angel left home at fourteen after falling pregnant to her boyfriend Paul Harris (Ramsay Everingham). Frankie discovers Jack is cheating on her with Selina Cook (Tempany Deckert) and Sonia Johnson (Eva Matiuk) and the girls take revenge by stripping him. Frankie then leaves to return home to her parents.
12 September–21 November	Helen James	Roslyn Gentle	Helen is an officer from the department of Childcare Services (DOCS). Helen appears when Curtis (Shane Ammann) and Shannon Reed's (Isla Fisher) adoptive mother dies and asks the Rosses if they can take them in, however, they only have room for one. The Rosses take Shannon in and Curtis moves in with Alf (Ray Meagher) and Ailsa Stewart (Judy Nunn). Helen returns before Christmas to check up on Shannon and Jack Wilson (Daniel Amalm).
21 September 1994–17 September 1997	Dawn Cook	Kim Deacon	Dawn is Selina Cook's (Tempany Deckert) mother. When Selina returns to the Bay following their move away, Dawn tries to get her to return home but Selina refuses. Irene Roberts (Lynne McGranger) convinces Dawn to let her foster Selina and she agrees. Dawn returns three years later to help Selina prepare for her wedding to Steven Matheson (Adam Willits). Her presence serves to irritate Selina when she brings up her past relationships and quizzes Chloe Richards (Kristy Wright) about her failed relationship with her son Wayne (Josh Rosenthal). In the end, Selina tells Dawn to leave and she does.
30 September–3 October	Mrs Middleton	Clare Grant	Middleton is the head of a deportment school where Irene Roberts (Lynne McGranger) sends Selina Cook (Tempany Deckert).
10 October–17 January 1995	Ros Parrish	Angela Punch McGregor	Ros is the mother of Nick (Bruce Roberts) and Shane Parrish (Dieter Brummer). She arrives in Summer Bay after the death of her husband, Philip but Shane refuses to talk to her and is resentful towards her for neglecting him during childhood to focus on her law career. Shane eventually forgives her and they reconnect. However, when Ros begins interfering in his relationship with Angel Brooks (Melissa George), Shane becomes annoyed and asks her to leave.
24 October–9 November	Doctor Adams	Carol Tobin	Adams examines Roxy Miller (Lisa Lackey) after she discovers a lump in her breast.
2 November	Eddy Conners	Matthew Foster	Eddy is a student in Year 12 who is witness to a muck-up day prank pulled by Shane Parrish (Dieter Brummer), Angel Brooks (Melissa George) and Damian Roberts (Matt Doran)
16 November	Radiologist	Nell Hourn	A Radiologist who attends to Roxy Miller (Lisa Lackey) when she is treated for Breast cancer.
16 November	Dr. Blackburn	Christopher Burke	A Doctor who attends to Jack Wilson (Daniel Amalm) following a fall from the roof of Summer Bay House.
