= Simon Fitzgerald (Home and Away) =

- Home and Away character
- Portrayed by: Richard Norton
- Duration: 1991–1992
- First appearance: 25 September 1991
- Last appearance: 24 July 1992
- Introduced by: Des Monaghan
In-universe information
- Occupation: Student (1991–1992)
- Father: Bill Fitzgerald

Simon Fitzgerald is a fictional character from the Australian television soap opera Home and Away, played by Richard Norton. The character debuted on-screen during the episode broadcast on 25 September 1991. Norton was cast in the show after appearing in fellow soap opera Neighbours just a few months prior. Simon is characterised as a "joker" who enjoys playing pranks on his friends. Simon was introduced alongside his criminal father Bill Fitzgerald (Terry Bader), who soon abandoned him. Writers paired Simon with Sophie Simpson (Rebekah Elmaloglou) for his first relationship story, although she is pregnant with another man's child. Producers decided to write Norton out of the show after one year, which shocked Norton. This led him to accuse the show's production of promoting other cast members better in storylines. Simon departed during the episode broadcast on 24 July 1992.

== Casting ==
Prior to joining Home and Away, Norton had appeared on rival soap opera Neighbours as Ryan McLachlan for one year. Joining the series had changed Norton's perception of being a working actor. He told John Kersher in The Official Home and Away Annual that the "best thing" about Neighbours was the money, but at Home and Away it was about doing a job he enjoyed. Norton was one of only a few actors to appear in both shows. Norton made his first appearance during the episode broadcast on 25 September 1991.

== Development ==
Kercher described Simon as the serial's "resident heart-throb" and his "suntanned good looks mean that he never has a shortage of girls to go out with". There is no one that "fails to fall for his smooth talk". When Simon arrives in Summer Bay, he is "diligent and hardworking", a "model student" and has an "excellent academic record". But Simon also has a "mischievous side" and enjoys playing "elaborate pranks" which he always gets away with because "his politeness acts as the perfect foil". Simon's characterisation as a "joker" who enjoys playing pranks was implemented from his debut. Norton told a reporter from BIG! magazine that "he's developed a foolproof way of pulling off clever pranks without getting caught – and the girls usually fall for him." Norton believed that he played a "subdued" character in Neighbours which held back his portrayal. He felt more comfortable in Home and Away and made a more memorable character. He told Mark Barden from the Reading Post that "Simon was one of the regular Summer Bay kids like Blake and Sophie, and I think people associate me more with him."

Simon's mother died in the years before he moved to Summer Bay. His father Bill (Terry Bader) decided to relocate to the area, but Simon becomes "puzzled" by the quick move and assumes it is for business reasons. He later discovers that Bill had embezzled money. After an argument with Bill, Simon decides to move in with Blake Dean (Les Hill). The series formed an on-screen duo with Simon and Blake. Norton told Josephine Monroe from Inside Soap that he and Hill "built up quite a rapport" and they worked hard on their characters' friendship. Norton liked the idea of "these two young lads being cheeky and wacky", they were the "Laurel and Hardy" of Summer Bay. In one storyline Simon begins a relationship with Sophie Simpson (Rebekah Elmaloglou). The scripts required for Norton and Elmaloglou to kiss multiple times during the story. Norton told Trish Pavone from BIG! magazine that during one scene in which they kissed, Elmaloglou joked that she would bite his tongue off if she felt it. Later Sophie finds out that she is pregnant by another character. Simon decides to pretend that he is the baby's father so that Sophie will not have face parenthood alone. As a reporter from Channel 5 wrote "Simon's declaration that he is the dad comes as just as much of a surprise [for Sophie]. Although she's uneasy about the lie, Sophie can't deny Simon's logic." They added that she "fudges the dates" and everyone thinks that Sophie slept with Simon "the minute he arrived in town". But eventually truth comes out. Norton said that it was an example of a "good storyline" for Simon and said that it was the "hardest" he had to portray. Sophie later runs away from home and sleeps rough in the city, forcing Simon to try and rescue her.

Later Lisa Anthony from BIG! magazine reported that Kathryn Dufty had been cast in the role of Toni Bryant. She added that while Toni comes to Summer Bay with Blake, it would be Simon who she makes an "immediate impression" on. She also released pictures of the duo kissing. Toni comes to the Bay as part of a student exchange program. Everyone assumes that she is a boy called Tony, until she arrives with her father Phil (Vince Martin) and reveals her name is short for Antonia. Norton explained that before meeting Toni, Simon "had just about lost all faith in women. He'd liked Sophie and a few other girls but his luck had always been bad. It's like a dream come true when Toni comes along. He thinks all this Christmases have come at once." Alf Stewart (Ray Meagher) is against having a teenage boy and girl under his roof, so Simon has to agree to strict house rules. Simon eventually tells Toni that he really likes her, and Alf and Ailsa Stewart (Judy Nunn) trusts them to be sensible.

In 1992, producers decided to write out Norton's character to concentrate on developing other characters. He told Monroe that "I was prepared for two years work on the show and it came as quite a shock when they told me they were letting me go." Norton thought that the work he had put in for Home and Away was "quite good". But producers informed him that Simon "had done his bit" and they were more interested in "pushing" Dieter Brummer and Matt Doran who play Shane Parrish and Damian Roberts respectively. Norton explained to Monroe that he was not "bitter" about being fired because the producers had given him plenty of notice. Speaking of Simon's departure storyline, Norton stated that Simon receives a letter from his father who has been released on parole. He decides to accept Bill's invitation to go and live with him. Norton "liked" the way his character was written out of the series but wished he could have stayed in the show. He told a reporter from BIG! magazine that there were "no deaths or major dramas" which meant Simon could return in the future. He concluded that despite leaving her behind, "Simon stays madly in love with Sophie."

== Storylines ==
Simon attends Summer Bay High as a new student and quickly befriends his new classmates Blake and Sophie. On his first day, he sticks a drawing of pig on the back of Lois Crawford (Tina Bursill) much to the amusement of the class. When Blake's guardians Alf (Ray Meagher) and Ailsa Stewart (Judy Nunn) go away, Simon persuades Blake to use the empty house to entertain two girls from school, Sharyn McKinley (Liza Witt) and Annette Hodges (Kylle Hogart). However, upset at being seen as easy conquests, the girls decide to play a trick on them by planting a bra down the back of the sofa for Alf and Ailsa to find when they got home. The pair are in trouble until Simon persuades the girls to admit to the joke.

Simon's father Bill attempts to cheat the Stewarts and Simon admits to Blake that Bill has a history of dodgy dealings which saw them driven out of their old town. After failing to reason with Bill, Simon agrees Blake needs to tell Alf and Ailsa, who pull out of the deal. Angry at the betrayal, Bill hits Simon and decides to leave town. He asks Simon to go with him but Simon refuses and stays with the Stewarts instead. He and Blake pretend that he is only staying for three months while Bill gets things set up. Alf and Ailsa learn the truth but eventually agree to let Simon stay permanently.

Simon is attracted to Sophie and persuades her to come out on a date with him. They go to a concert in the city but Simon loses their train tickets home and they are fined. Despite the setback, Sophie eventually agrees to keep seeing him. However, Sophie has learnt she is pregnant by her late boyfriend David Croft (Guy Pearce) and is keeping it secret from Simon. Her friend Finlay Roberts (Tina Thomsen) tells him the truth and Simon agrees to stand by Sophie, even pretending to be the baby's father. However, David's sister Lou (Dee Smart) sees through the deception and forces Sophie to admit the truth. After Sophie runs away to the city, Simon tracks her down and bring her back to the Bay. Sophie's reliance on Simon, even though they are no longer a couple, costs him dates and he admits it to Lou. Sophie is angry with Simon at first but admits she has put too much pressure on him.

Simon learns Bill has been arrested for fraud and is convinced he is innocent this time. He prepares to leave town to support him but Bill refuses to see him, wanting him to get on with his life. Simon then supports Blake, whose girlfriend Meg Bowman (Cathy Godbold) has terminal leukaemia, and is there for him when she dies. The boys enter a fun run but get extremely competitive and train heavily. They bet over who can win a race between them and Simon wins by cheating. Blake finds out but decides to make Simon feel bad by refusing to let him return the bet, only for Simon to throw the money at him. The pair help out Finlay's younger brother Damian when he is being bullied by threatening the bully Tug O'Neale (Tristan Bancks) into letting Damian beat him in a fight. This fails to stop the antagonism between the pair but Damian eventually deals with Tug without their help. They inadvertently help Ryan Lee's (Alistair MacDougall) attempt to win Lucinda back by pinning up a nude painting Lucinda had done of her fiancé Nick Parrish (Bruce Roberts) during the fun run.

Simon finds Adam Cameron's (Mat Stevenson) "little black book" and invites one of the girls in it to the house but is caught out by Alf and Ailsa. Adam gets his own back by putting a fake entry in the book and priming the girl in question to come on strong in order to give Simon a fright. Simon then takes an interest in Toni, an attractive farm girl who arrives to stay with Alf and Ailsa on an exchange instead of the boy they expected. Alf is uncomfortable with the pair staying together under his roof but the resulting holiday romance is not serious and Simon helps Toni come to terms with her father Philip (Vince Martin) becoming engaged to Marilyn Chambers (Emily Symons), who is closer to their age than Philip's. Shortly before Toni leaves, Simon receives a letter from Bill who has now been paroled, asking Simon to live with him. He decides to give his father a second chance and leaves a note for Alf and Ailsa.

== Reception ==
Jenna Price from The Sydney Morning Herald said that Simon was a "chivalrous" type of character. Inside Soap's Monroe branded Simon a "crafty character". While Brendon Williams of the Daily Mirror and Mike Taggart from the South Wales Echo said that Norton proved to be "a big hit" as Simon. Channel 5 chose the episode in which Simon pretends to be the father of Sophie's child as one of their favourite ever Home and Away episodes. An Inside Soap reporter branded him a "Home and Away heart-throb" and Rav Singh from News Group Newspapers branded him "hunky Simon". A writer from BIG! magazine chose Simon searching for a homeless Sophie in the city, as the week's biggest soap story in the United Kingdom. Sue Malins from the Daily Mirror described Simon as "a model student who looks like butter wouldn't melt in his mouth. But Summer Bay High students and teachers will soon discover he has a passion - for highly creative and risky practical jokes."
