= Lucinda Croft =

- Home and Away character
- Portrayed by: Dee Smart
- Duration: 1991–1992
- First appearance: 13 June 1991
- Last appearance: 16 September 1992
- Introduced by: Des Monaghan
In-universe information
- Occupation: Artist
- Mother: Mary Croft
- Brothers: David Croft
- Grandmothers: Isobel DuPre
- Uncles: Donald Fisher; Clive Fisher
- Nieces: Tamara Simpson
- First cousins: Bobby Marshall; Alan Fisher; Rebecca Nash; Byron Fisher

Lucinda Claire "Lou" Croft is a fictional character from the Australian Channel Seven soap opera Home and Away, played by Dee Smart. The character made her first screen appearance on 13 June 1991. Smart successfully auditioned for the role in her final year of drama studies and began filming in April 1991. Lucinda is characterised as a "tomboy" who rides a motorbike and has a self-assured persona. Lucinda arrives in Summer Bay to live with her uncle, Donald Fisher (Norman Coburn). Writers soon introduced her estranged brother David Croft (Guy Pearce) and set up a romance with Nick Parrish (Bruce Roberts).

Their romance was developed into a love triangle when Lucinda's ex-boyfriend Ryan Lee (Alistair MacDougall) arrived. He begins a campaign of manipulation to snare Lucinda from Nick. The story gained notoriety in Australia as Smart was verbally abused in the street by viewers and MacDougall feared for his safety. After only eight months in the role, Smart gave an interview to Australian television magazine TV Week. She criticised the show so much that producers retaliated by publicly terminating her Home and Away contract in a later interview printed in the magazine. Lucinda's final storyline portrayed her leaving both Nick and Ryan to reside in Perth.

== Casting ==
Smart had been studying drama in Sydney for three years at Ensemble Theatre. In her final year she decided to attend the audition for Lucinda. It was Smart's first ever acting role. The actress signed a contract to remain with the series for two years. Smart began filming for the role in April 1991. She told Mary Fletcher of Inside Soap that she was "a wreck" before filming her first scenes but soon learned to cope with the process. Each weekend Smart would attend acting classes to improve her skills.

== Development ==
=== Characterisation and family ===
Lucinda was introduced into the series as the niece of established character Donald Fisher (Norman Coburn). Around the same time producers hired Guy Pearce to play Lucinda's brother David Croft. Lucinda and David had become estranged after a family argument. David arrives in Summer Bay to make amends. In The Official Home and Away Annual, John Kercher detailed that "lots of eyebrows were raised" by Lucinda's entrance into Summer Bay astride a motorbike. Donald is "shocked" by her arrival and appearance having best remembered her as a child playing with dolls. Kercher stated that Lucinda is characterised as a "leather-clad, self-assured young woman." She also had a "tomboy" dress sense. Smart revealed in a TVTimes interview that Lucinda does not "believe in sticking to tradition". Lucinda's cousin, Bobby Simpson (Nicolle Dickson) had been led to believe Lucinda was a "complete bore" by Donald but surprised to learn she is the opposite. Lucinda is multiskilled and has good mechanic skills, especially concerning motorbike repairs. She also has a degree in art. Kercher noted that during her time Lucinda gains a "reputation for being a bit of a flirt, but she claims she only played the field until the right guy came along." Smart has stated that like her character she is not traditional; Lucinda does not care about doing "the 'done' thing".

=== Love triangle ===
"Old flames from way back Lucinda and Ryan created sparks. Lucinda had a big decision to make - Ryan or Nick? [...] She chose neither and elected to leave Summer Bay."

— A writer from Home and Away – Official Collector's Edition on the love triangle. (2009)

Producers paired Lucinda with policeman Nick Parrish (Bruce Roberts) for her first romance story. Their relationship becomes serious and they discuss marriage. Writers developed the story love triangle and introduced Lucinda's ex-boyfriend Ryan Lee (Alistair MacDougall) in the show. In the character's backstory, Lucinda and Ryan broke-up and she decided to move to Summer Bay and live with Donald. Ryan eventually tracks Lucinda down wanting to reconcile their romance. His arrival occurs at the moment Lucinda and Nick are considering their engagement. She was easily tempted by Ryan, but Nick decides to compete to win her affections. Nick places posters around Summer Bay confessing his love and Lucinda chooses to remain with him.

Ryan later returns with a new plan to snare Lucinda from Nick. MacDougall told an Inside Soap columnist that he felt sorry for Lucinda. He branded it a "it's a strange situation" and "Lucinda doesn't know where her loyalties lie or feelings." Ryan creates little scams to make him seem better than Nick. His end game is to get Lucinda to admit she still has romantic feelings for him. MacDougall stated that Ryan is "optimistic" because he had always loved her, she is his "definite goal". As the pair spend time together, viewers were given a chance to witness what their romance used to be like. They also portrayed plenty of tension between them, which MacDougall believed kept viewers guessing.

The two characters had completely different characterisation; MacDougall explained that Nick is "the authoritarian type and the other's a rich, good time guy who happens to be a bastard." He added that Ryan is "egotistical, self-centred and worldly" and knows how to play Lucinda to his advantage. He also does not care about ruining Nick's life and "takes great joy of seeing Nick squirm". Nick becomes aware of the growing chemistry between Lucinda and Ryan. MacDougall concluded that Nick quite rightly became "overly protective" of Lucinda as he knew of Ryan's scheming. Ryan hatches to new scheme and starts dating Marilyn Chambers (Emily Symons). They break-up when it becomes apparent that he is using her to make Lucinda jealous.

Lucinda realises that Nick is dependable and agrees to marry him. Ryan ramps up his scheming and manages to lure Lucinda into a kiss. Smart defended her character's behaviour; she told a reporter from TVTimes that "imagine being chased by two gorgeous guys - any girl would be so flattered she wouldn't know which one to pick." Smart believed that Lucinda "kept them both dangling on a string" as she would sneak between the two characters. When Nick works a night shift, Lucinda goes to Ryan's caravan and he professes his love. Smart believed that this left her character torn. After their tryst is revealed, Ryan leaves town hoping Lucinda will follow.

Nick eventually forgives Lucinda for cheating on him. Nick decides to ask Lucinda to marry him. Lucinda once viewed Nick as being "too straight" for her "rebellious nature", but he emerges as the victor in the love triangle story. To make amends Lucinda decides to arrange a surprise holiday for Nick. He witnesses Lucinda laughing with the travel agent and accuses her of having another affair. Realising there is no longer trust in their relationship, Lucinda breaks up with Nick and leaves town. MacDougall explained that Ryan "couldn't believe it" when Lucinda moved on without him because "he's used to getting everything he's ever wanted." Recalling filming with Roberts, Smart added he was "fun to work with" and he had a "special place in [her] heart" because he formed her first on-screen kiss.

MacDougall was unhappy with the development of the story. He told Josephine Monroe from Inside Soap that the cast worked hard to create the love triangle and it looked set for "a brilliant climax". This was not the case and MacDougall visited the head scriptwriter to complain. He accused the show of lazy writing and believed they did not do "all they could to make the story work." Subsequently "the plot just draws on for too long". The love triangle story gained a notoriety in Australia and Smart began to receive abuse while out in public. She explained that it was mainly men who would verbally abuse her calling her a "two-timer" and a "teaser". Smart claimed that on one occasion she had to confront a group of roadwork men who verbally abused her and she demanded an apology. MacDougall had a similar response from viewers who took a dislike to Ryan and even feared for his safety.

=== Departure ===
Smart decided to give the magazine TV Week a "scathing" interview about her role in the serial. Only eight months into her contract, Smart told the publication that she felt as though she was completing a "prison sentence". She added that "It feels like I've been here for years". Smart criticised the serial for their fast production. She claimed there was no time to develop a character and said it was "impossible to do a good job" because of the time limits. Smart even said that she was surprised there was time to do any acting. Smart also spoke negatively about Lucinda because she "goes on and on and on - it is kind of abnormal for a character to last this long". Smart ended the interview by saying she would not sign another long-term contract.

Smart's comments annoyed the Seven Network, who tried to release her from her contract. The move proved difficult because the serial had already planned storylines for Lucinda in advance. TV Week said that the character would have to remain in the serial for "some time yet". However, producers retaliated further by publicly sacking Smart via an announcement in TV Week and Lucinda was written out of the serial. Speaking of her departure, Smart told Inside Soap that she had learned a "tremendous amount" from working on the series. Writers gave Lucinda a low-key exit from the series when she abruptly moved to Perth.

== Storylines ==
Lucinda arrives in Summer Bay to visit her uncle, Donald. They have not seen each other for many years and Donald is left bewildered when Lucinda turns out to be a tomboy into motorbikes. Donald still wants the best for his niece though and tries to set her up with policeman Nick by inviting them both round for a dinner party. Lucinda quickly figures out Donald's scheme but learns Nick is genuinely interested in her. After a series of false starts, Nick stops Lucinda as she is about to leave town and kisses her. Lou attempts to put some spark in their relationship by organizing a treasure hunt, although Nick is disappointed when the prize turns out to be a toy car he wanted as a child rather than Lou herself. Lucinda's life takes knock when her brother David arrives to stay, since relations between the two siblings are somewhat strained after his poor financial advice led to their parents losing their home. Just as they begin to put the past behind them, David is killed in a car accident caused by teenager Karen Dean (Belinda Jarrett).

Lucinda is left in shock by the incident and is even further thrown when David's friend Ryan, an old boyfriend of hers, arrives in the wake of the tragedy. Lucinda increasingly leans on Ryan, distancing herself from Nick. Ryan persuades her to return to their home town of Perth, Western Australia with him but just as they are taking a taxi out of town, Nick appears at the roadside with a placard asking her to marry him. Lucinda quickly accepts his offer, staying in Summer Bay. Nick and Lucinda try to settle down but have trouble finding somewhere to live. They make an offer on their dream home but when they arrive to take possession they find two other couples there and no sign of the people they paid their deposit to: The sale was a con job. With Donald insisting they sleep in separate rooms if they live with him, they end up staying at the caravan park. Nick's pride is further dented when Lucinda takes a job with the council road gang to earn money although she soon quits when she grows tired of the foreman's chauvinism.

When Lucinda discovers that Sophie Simpson (Rebekah Elmaloglou), who David had been dating, is pregnant, she strongly suspects that David is the father and not Sophie's friend Simon Fitzgerald (Richard Norton) as she had claimed. Lucinda is correct but the stress of the situation causes Sophie to run away from home. Her mishandling causes Lucinda to realise that the baby wouldn't be a replacement for David. Sophie has trouble accepting the same and Lucinda is grateful when Ryan returns to town and helps convince her that the baby is a person in its own right.

Ryan continues to be a rock, helping Lucinda and Sophie set up a nursery for the baby, causing Nick to worry that he is still interested in Lucinda. The couple move with Donald to his new house, although they arrive to find the house is not ready and have to spend the night with Bobby and her boyfriend Greg Marshall (Ross Newton). Ryan steals a nude painting of Nick Lou had done and manipulates Simon and his friend Blake Dean (Les Hill) into displaying it in public but Lou refuses to believe Ryan was involved. Nick's younger brother Shane (Dieter Brummer) arrives to stay, wreaking havoc in the process. After he and Lucinda argue at Greg and Bobby's wedding reception, Ryan corners Lucinda outside and kisses her.

Lucinda feels guilty about the incident but is unable to deny she still has feelings for Ryan. Marilyn, who Ryan had briefly dated in order to hide his interest in Lucinda, sees the pair kissing and demands that Lucinda tell Nick. Distressed, Lucinda goes to see Ryan in his caravan and sleeps with him. She regrets it instantly but Donald realises the truth when he hears Ryan dropping her off at the house. Ryan kisses Lucinda again but she pushes him away. However, the event is witnessed by Shane and his friend Damian Roberts (Matt Doran). Shane assumes they were having an affair and starts a revenge campaign against Ryan that lands him in trouble with the law and Lucinda is forced to confess everything to Nick. She rejects Ryan and he leaves town, finally admitting defeat. Nick and Lucinda try to salvage their relationship but the damage is already done. Nick misses out on a promotion at work and blames Lucinda for distracting him. The final straw comes when Nick gets angry when Lucinda talks to another man. It is clear the trust has gone out of their relationship. Lucinda breaks things off for good and leaves for Perth.

== Reception ==
Mary Fletcher of Inside Soap said that Smart helped make Lucinda one of Home and Away's most popular characters. Their colleague branded Lucinda as "headstrong and opinionated" and one of the show's most "volatile" characters. Alex Cramb from the publication criticised Lucinda's exit storyline. He branded it a "big fizzer", "boring" and "disappointing". Cramb added that "after some fantastic action from the tortured love triangle of Nick, Ryan and Lou, we were expecting some pretty big fireworks. Some were even hoping that the annoying Lou might be killed off in a horrible bus smash." Another Inside Soap journalist branded her an artistic character and opined that "Lucinda didn't waste any time getting to grips with the local men either." In 2020, Aoife Ryan Christensen from Evoke wrote that fans still remember Smart as the "tomboyish Lucinda Croft". A Daily Mirror columnist branded Lucinda a "rebel" and Bernard Bale from The Stage called her the "love-tangle teacher". A What's on TV reporter previewed a "tough week" for Lucinda and Nick, branding their relationship a "on-off love affair". They opined that the duo had endured "more ups and downs than a roller coaster" and "a lot of heartache".
