= Nick Parrish =

- Home and Away character
- Portrayed by: Bruce Roberts
- Duration: 1991–1994
- First appearance: 4 March 1991
- Last appearance: 10 June 1994
- Introduced by: Des Monaghan
In-universe information
- Occupation: Police officer
- Father: Philip Parrish
- Mother: Ros Parrish
- Brothers: Shane Parrish
- Nieces: Shane Parrish Jr.

Nicholas Jasper "Nick" Parrish is a fictional character from the Australian soap opera Home and Away, played by Bruce Roberts. He made his first appearance during the episode broadcast on 4 March 1991 and departed on 10 June 1994.

== Casting ==
In late December 1990, a reporter for TV Week confirmed Bruce Roberts had been cast as Constable Nick Parrish, a new police officer for the serial. Roberts received the role of Nick a day after he left drama school. To prepare for the role, Roberts spoke with "street cops" to find out what the job was like. When he received scripts saying how to do his character's job, he would look into how it was really done. In one scene in which he had to arrest someone, they filmed two different versions using the writer's way and the correct way. Roberts did acknowledge that compromises had to be made, as they were filming a drama and not a documentary.

== Development ==
In one storyline Nick begins a relationship with Julie Gibson (Naomi Watts). However, when Julie's brother Revhead (Gavin Harrison) learns of their romance he is not happy. As Tom Etherington from TV Week reported, Revhead "didn't do anything by the book" and "his head nearly exploded" because Nick is a police officer. He "tried his best" to separate the pair but they end the relationship on their own terms. Etherington added that "it became obvious they were better suited to being just good friends".

After his relationship with Lucinda Croft (Dee Smart) ended, Nick fell for Roxanne Miller (Lisa Lackey). A writer for the TV Times commented "The soap's unlucky-in-love copper Nick appears to have fallen in a big way for Roxy". They added that Nick might be embarking on a new relationship too soon, while Roxy also believed Nick still loved Lucinda. Roxy was wary of getting involved with Nick and when his ex-girlfriend Sandy (Claudia Black) turned up in the Bay, she decided to put him to "a love test", which Nick passed. Of Nick and Roxy, Roberts said "On the outside, Nick looks as if he got his act together after Lucinda left him, but underneath he's vulnerable. He fancies Roxy, but doesn't want his heart broken again." Nick and Roxy eventually shared a "passionate kiss" signalling the beginning of their relationship.

In the 26 February 1994 issue of TV Week, David Brown reported that Roberts would be leaving Home and Away in order to relocate to the UK. A spokesperson for the show told Brown that it was "a very amicable departure from the show". Roberts quit the serial to be with his girlfriend, Suzanne Dando. He met her while starring in a pantomime during the 1993 Christmas production break. Roberts told Lisa Anthony from BIG! that his girlfriend was just one of the reasons why he had chosen to leave. Roberts filmed his final scenes for the show on 15 April 1994.

== Storylines ==
Nick arrives in Summer Bay and rents a room from Marilyn Chambers (Emily Symons) at the beach house. Their housemate Bobby Simpson (Nicolle Dickson) believes he is attracted to Marilyn but he soon befriends Julie, a young disabled woman. Julie's brother, local criminal Revhead, is unhappy about his sister spending time with a police officer and tries to get Nick into trouble with his superiors. Nick is concerned when Julie develops feelings for him but before he can put her straight Julie's father Alec (David Baldwyn) dies of a heart attack and he has to support her in the aftermath. Nick eventually admits he only has feelings for Julie as a friend. Julie soon leaves the Bay to attend college.

Nick is not single long as Donald Fisher (Norman Coburn) plays matchmaker between him and his niece, Lucinda Croft, who arrives to live with him. Nick and Lou begin dating but when Lou's brother, David (Guy Pearce) dies in a car accident, she turns to David's best friend, her former boyfriend Ryan Lee (Alistair MacDougall), for support and breaks up with Nick. Nick tries to get over Lou by dating another girl, Isabelle Britton (Collette Roberts), but realises he still loves her. As Lou is about to return to Perth with Ryan, Nick appears at the roadside and convinces Lou to stay. Ryan leaves, defeated, and Nick and Lou become engaged.

Ryan returns and causes trouble for Nick and Lou by stealing a nude painting Lou has done of Nick and persuading Simon Fitzgerald (Richard Norton) and his friend Blake Dean (Les Hill) to publicly display it. Nick's teenage brother Shane (Dieter Brummer) arrives in the bay and causes trouble by taking Donald's car for a joyride. Nick discovers that Shane is hassling Ryan because he believes he is having an affair with Lou. Lou admits to sleeping with Ryan and Nick tries to forgive her but the relationship collapses and Lou and Ryan leave the bay separately. Sometime after Nick dates Roxanne Miller for several weeks, but the relationship does not go anywhere.

When Shane is accused of a burglary at a house where he was doing community service, Nick is sceptical of his protests of innocence at first but eventually believes Shane and supports him in court. Shane is jailed but later released when Tug O'Neale (Tristan Bancks) confesses. Nick helps convince Shane not to go back to his old self-destructive behaviour. Nick later convinces Shane to do work experience at the police station but this blows up in his face when Shane uses Nick's password to access confidential records and finds that his girlfriend Angel Brooks (Melissa George) has a son. Nick then mediates between the couple after Shane finds the discovery hard to take.

Nick is involved in a minor car accident when Sam Marshall (Ryan Clark) runs out in front of him. He then joins a yoga class as part of his physiotheraphy, where he befriends local teacher Beth Armstrong (Toni Pearen). The pair arrange a date but Nick is shocked when Tug, one of Beth's pupils, confronts him and reveals he and Beth are in love and will start a relationship once he leaves school. Nick talks to Beth and she admits it is true. Beth leaves and Nick realises he wants to see more of the world than Summer Bay. He takes a posting in Africa and leaves.

== Reception ==
The character made it into the news when a female fan from the United Kingdom, named "Kate" mailed a letter addressed to "PC Nick Parish, Summer Bay, Australia". Even though the letter did not have an official stamp, the British post office mailed it for free. Australia Post realised who the letter was meant for and delivered it to the Network Seven studios. Roberts said that he received plenty of fan mail from the UK, but he had never had one like Kate's letter. The letter simply read "Dear Nick We will be married next week Kate." Alex Cramb writing for Inside Soap said that Nick, Lou and Ryan were involved in a "tortured love triangle" that boasted scenes of "fantastic action". A writer from What's on TV previewed a "tough week" for Nick and Lou and called their relationship a "on-off love affair". They added the couple endured "a lot of heartache" and "had more ups and downs than a roller coaster".
