= Sophie Simpson =

Fictional character from the Australian Channel Seven soap opera Home and Away

- Home and Away character
- Portrayed by: Rebekah Elmaloglou
- Duration: 1990–1993, 2002–2003, 2005
- First appearance: 23 January 1990
- Last appearance: 8 July 2005
- Introduced by: Des Monaghan (1990); Julie McGauran (2002–05)
In-universe information
- Occupation: Student at Summer Bay High (1990–92); Office Assistant (1992)
- Father: Al Simpson
- Sisters: Bobby Simpson (adoptive)
- Husband: Blake Dean (2005–)
- Sons: David Simpson
- Daughters: Tamara Simpson

Sophie Dean (also Simpson) is a fictional character from the Australian Channel Seven soap opera Home and Away, played by Rebekah Elmaloglou. She debuted on-screen during the episode airing on 23 January 1990 and appeared as a regular until 1993. Elmaloglou returned to filming when Sophie made subsequent guest appearances in 2002, 2003 and 2005.

== Casting ==
In 1991, Elmaloglou was forced to take a two-week break from filming due to exhaustion. In 1992, Elmaloglou decided to quit the serial to pursue other acting projects. She admitted that she found the long working hours hard and left when it took a negative impact on her health. In 2002 Elmaloglou agreed to return to the serial as part of Summer Bay's fictional celebrations. When Sophie returns, her daughter Tamara has just began attending high school and her ex-boyfriend Blake Dean (Les Hill) begins to develop romantic feelings for her again. She returned again in 2003 for Sally Fletcher's (Kate Richie) wedding, and in 2005 for Alf Stewart's (Ray Meagher) sixtieth birthday party.

== Storylines ==
Sophie's mother died when she was young and was in and out of foster homes until her father Al (Terence Donovan) showed up and offered her a place with him. At this time Sophie was an accomplished shoplifter and con artist.

Sophie arrives in Summer Bay with Al and continues her shoplifting ways but realises Al is only interested in her, as she is able to get him money. Al is later arrested for the murder of Shane Wilson, whom he killed eight years prior and Sophie then is fostered by Tom (Roger Oakley) and Pippa Fletcher (Vanessa Downing). Sophie becomes fast friends with Tom and Pippa's adoptive daughter Sally (Kate Ritchie). Pippa discovers that Sophie is illiterate and the family help her catch up with her education and receives extra help from newly arrived schoolteacher Grant Mitchell (Craig McLachlan). When orphaned teens Blake and Karen Dean (Belinda Jarrett) arrive in Summer Bay, Sophie quickly befriends them and takes a shine to Blake and they begin dating. Their relationship comes to a halt after Sophie kisses Haydn Ross (Andrew Hill) sparking ill-feeling between Haydn and Blake. Sophie finds herself involved in mind-games when Pippa and her new husband Michael Ross (Dennis Coard) decide to foster another teenager, Tracey Turner (Tania Martin) who takes an instant dislike to Sophie. This culminates in a vicious fight in their bedroom and Tracey is sent to live with another family.

After Sophie's relationship with Haydn fizzles out and she soon turns her attentions to David Croft (Guy Pearce), Donald Fisher's (Norman Coburn) nephew and a teacher at Summer Bay High. They begin a relationship and Pippa and Michael are unhappy about it and send Sophie to stay with Pippa's mother Coral King (Jessica Noad) for a while. David is killed in a car accident caused by Karen. When Sophie returns from Coral's she is heartbroken to learn David is dead and is shocked to learn she is pregnant with his child. Simon Fitzgerald (Richard Norton) agrees to pretend the child is his at first but Sophie tells him not to. She is unsure if she wants to keep the baby and considering adoption. Sophie goes into labour and Pippa and Michael are on hand to support her and she gives birth to a baby girl, who she names Tamara (Emily & Chloe Hutton).

Sophie takes a job at an office to support Tamara but finds herself fighting off the unwanted advances of her boss Colin Smithers (Frank Garfield) who kisses her one day. Sophie avoids Smithers by not going into work the following day prompting concern from Pippa. Sophie tells her of Smithers' behaviour and Pippa supports her in confronting him. Shortly after, Sophie becomes infatuated with Ryan Lee (Alistair MacDougall) but he is not interested in her on the same level. Sophie then suffers a breakdown and considers putting Tamara up for adoption but David's mother, Mary (Jan Kingsbury) talks her out of it and asks her to move to Perth with her and Sophie accepts.

Sophie returns for the 150th birthday of Summer Bay. She and Blake rekindle their relationship. Sophie accepts Sally and her fiancé Flynn Saunders' (Joel McIlroy) request to be a surrogate for them, but she miscarries. She later finds out she is pregnant with Blake's baby and she goes into labour on the night before Sally and Flynn's wedding. They have a son, who Sophie names David after her first love. She and Blake break up after Blake stands her up at the registry office, but they reunite at Alf's 60th birthday party a couple of years later and resume their engagement.

== Reception ==
For her portrayal of Sophie, Elmaloglou received a nomination for the Logie Award for Most Popular New Talent in 1991. She won the People's Choice Award for Best Actress in 1993. That same year, she received a nomination for the Logie Award for Most Popular Actress. Holy Soap included Elmaloglou in their feature on the "Sexiest Home and Away girls ever." They also said Sophie was a "tearaway." Jess McGuire of Defamer said that she found Sophie and Blake being intimate, more disturbing to watch than Charlie Buckton and Joey Collins kissing. Rachel Browne of The Sun-Herald said Sophie was the serial's "angst-ridden teen" who was beaten, abused and ended up becoming an "unwed teenage mother". Michael Idato of The Sydney Morning Herald said that Sophie was one of the "golden years" characters that made the serial feel "very mid-'80s". Inside Soap ran a feature compiling "The 100 greatest soap stories ever told". They featured the story of Sophie becoming a single mother following David's death as their 89th choice.
