= Ryan Lee (Home and Away) =

Fictional character

- Home and Away character
- Portrayed by: Alistair MacDougall
- Duration: 1991–92
- First appearance: 22 August 1991
- Last appearance: 27 November 1992
- Introduced by: Des Monaghan

Ryan Lee is a fictional character from the Australian soap opera Home and Away, played by Alistair MacDougall. He made his first screen appearance on 22 August 1991. Ryan was MacDougall's first television role after previously working as a model. Ryan is characterised as a rich, good time guy with a selfish and manipulative personality. The character was introduced into the series as the ex-boyfriend of Lucinda Croft (Dee Smart). He arrives hoping to reconcile their relationship but is shocked to find her coupled with Nick Parrish (Bruce Roberts). Writers played the two characters as complete opposites and Nick the dependable policeman.

Ryan was portrayed embarking on a series of schemes to snare Lucinda from Nick. The love triangle story gained notoriety in Australia where MacDougall feared for his public safety and Smart was verbally abused by men in the streets. The story ended with Lucinda leaving both Ryan and Nick to live alone in Perth. Producers wanted MacDougall to join the show's regular cast but he declined. In late 1992, he returned for one final time to give the character some closure.

== Casting ==
MacDougall was a model before he took the role of Ryan in Home and Away. It was his first television role. When he auditioned for the part casting directors were "so impressed" that they did not consider his lack of experience and offered him a two-year contract. However, MacDougall only stayed with the soap for a year. When the actor departed in late 1992, he told Josephine Monroe from Inside Soap that because he loved playing Ryan, he would go back for a cameo appearance as long as the scriptwriters made his character bad. He added "I would have stayed longer before if the scripts had been good enough."

== Development ==
MacDougall described Ryan as a rich, good time guy "who happens to be a bastard!" He explained that Ryan was not very nice, calling him "egotistical, self-centred, and worldly so he knows how to pull off a few scams and set things up to advantage." Ryan does not mind seeing other people suffer if they are in his way. An Inside Soap reporter commented that MacDougall and Ryan "are poles apart".

Ryan began a relationship with Lucinda Croft (Dee Smart), while they both lived in Perth. The couple became "very serious" about each other, but they eventually broke up and Lucinda moved to Summer Bay. In The Official Home and Away Annual John Kercher explained that Ryan arrives in Summer Bay to "win back the affections" of Lucinda. But Ryan did not expect to find her dating Nick Parrish (Bruce Roberts). Kercher described Ryan as "very charming" with "extremely manipulative" tendencies. So when Lucinda's brother David (Guy Pearce) dies he uses it as an "opportunity" to comfort her, while hoping that it will lead to the reconciliation of their relationship. Ryan almost wins Lucinda back, but at the last minute Nick put up posters all over town saying how much he loved her and she decided to stay with him. Ryan left the Bay and began to come up with another way to win her back.

Upon Ryan's return to Summer Bay, "a hot tempered love triangle" between him, Lucinda and Nick began. MacDougall stated "It's a strange situation. Lou doesn't know where her loyalties lie or her feelings. I'd feel sorry for anyone in that position." The actor explained that Ryan is very optimistic and he sets up "little scams" to further himself in everyone's eyes. However, what he really wants to do is get Lucinda to admit that she feels something for him. Lucinda starts to show a bit more interest in Ryan, so viewers got to see what it must have been like between them before they split up. MacDougall said "There's constant tension between them and when you see them together on screen, you can't help thinking, 'Oh no, what's going to happen now?" The actor told an Inside Soap writer that Ryan takes great joy in seeing Nick squirm and he has no problem with trying to split him and Lucinda up. Nick becomes protective of Lucinda as he knows what Ryan is like.

Ryan hatches to new scheme and starts dating Marilyn Chambers (Emily Symons). They break-up when it becomes apparent that he is using her to make Lucinda jealous. Lucinda decides she wants to marry Nick, believing he is more dependable than Ryan. This leaves him "devastated" but his next scheme culminates in him kissing Lucinda. Smart defended her character's behaviour in an interview printed in TVTimes. Smart believed that her character was just as bad as Ryan as she "kept them both dangling on a string". When Nick works a night shift, Lucinda goes to Ryan's caravan and he professes his love. Smart believed that this left her character torn. The love triangle story gained a notoriety in Australia MacDougall claimed he feared for his safety while out in public. Smart began to receive abuse in the streets. She explained that it was mainly men who would verbally abuse her calling her a "two-timer" and a "teaser".

MacDougall commented that the cast worked hard in building up the love triangle and just when it looked like it was heading towards "a brilliant climax", he believed the scriptwriters had started to rest on their laurels. He did not think they did all they could to make the story work and he started to worry about the decline in the standards of the scripts. The actor told Monroe "I went to see the head scriptwriter and said 'Look, what's going on? What's going to happen?' He said they were running out of bad things for Ryan to do, so he goes through a strange metamorphosis and the plot just draws on for too long." A writer for Home and Away – Official Collector's Edition stated that "old flames from way back Lucinda and Ryan created sparks". Lucinda had a "big decision" to make in choosing between Ryan and Nick. But ultimately she decides to leave both of them and Summer Bay too.

Producers brought Ryan back for one final story to bring closure for Ryan. Upon his return to Summer Bay, Nick and his younger brother Shane Parrish (Dieter Brummer) are angry to see him. Ryan decides to concentrate his efforts on improving personality and reputation in the town. MacDougall told a TVTimes writer that Ryan is "flawed" because he has been accustomed to getting everything he wanted. He added "that's why he couldn't believe it when Lu turned him down. He's learned his lesson up to a point - but he still has a long way to go." Writers created a new romantic scenario between Ryan and Sophie Simpson (Rebekah Elmaloglou). The TVTimes reporter concluded that Ryan's selfishness would "spell heartache". After completing his final guest role, MacDougall moved to Los Angeles to find work in the film industry.

== Storylines ==
Ryan is a former flame of Lucinda whose brother David who attended the same university and played on the same Rugby team as him. Following David's death, Ryan arrives in Summer Bay to win Lou back and is almost successful in getting her to return home to Perth with him until local police officer Nick tells Lou how he feels about her. Ryan leaves defeated but returns several months later. There is still tension between him and Nick over Lou but this subsides when Ryan begins a relationship with Marilyn Chambers. This turns out to be a smokescreen to mask Ryan's true feelings for Lou. He and Lou begin seeing each other in secret until Marilyn witnesses them kissing and tells Nick.

Nick's younger brother, Shane begins a harassment campaign against Ryan by vandalizing his caravan and stealing Ryan's car and dumping it in the sea. Ryan leaves but returns for a short while and helps support Sophie, the mother of David's daughter Tamara (Emily & Chloe Hutton). Sophie develops feelings for Ryan but he does not reciprocate and leaves again.

== Reception ==
An Inside Soap writer branded Ryan a "rich, ratbag", while another called him "the bad boy of Summer Bay". Alex Cramb from the same publication opined that the "tortured love triangle" between Ryan, Lou and Nick offered some "fantastic action". A reporter for the official Home and Away magazine commented that Ryan was "gorgeous, but wicked". MacDougall revealed that during his time on Home and Away he used to be fearful of walking down the streets, in case viewers thought he was "a complete bastard" like Ryan. A columnist from Shout said that MacDougall is "best known as Ryan the rascal in Home and Away". Sue Malins from the Daily Mirror stated that Ryan is "a handsome newcomer in Home and Away who will have girl fans rushing to clear space on their bedroom walls." Of Ryan's debut, a Sunday World journalist wrote that "Home and Away fans must have been drooling into their lunches on Tuesday when a handsome newcomer appeared in the Aussie soap."
