= Pippa Ross =

- Home and Away character
- Debra Lawrance as Pippa Ross
- Portrayed by: Vanessa Downing (1988–1990); Debra Lawrance (1990–2009)
- Duration: 1988–1998, 2000, 2002–2003, 2005–2009
- First appearance: 17 January 1988
- Last appearance: 8 May 2009
- Vanessa Downing as Pippa Fletcher
In-universe information
- Other names: Pippa Fletcher; Pippa Routledge
- Occupation: Nurse; Foster mother; Caravan Park owner
- Father: Bert King
- Mother: Coral King
- Brothers: Danny King
- Husband: Tom Fletcher (until 1990); Michael Ross (1991–96); Ian Routledge (1999–)
- Sons: Christopher Fletcher; Dale Ross
- Adoptive daughters: Sally Fletcher
- Stepsons: Haydn Ross
- Granddaughters: Pippa Saunders

Philippa "Pippa" Ross (also Fletcher) is a fictional character from the Australian television soap opera Home and Away. Actress Vanessa Downing originated the role and made her debut during the pilot episode broadcast on 17 January 1988. Downing quit the role in 1990, and Debra Lawrance was then cast. Pippa departed on 18 March 1998, but Lawrance has reprised the role for numerous returns between 2000 and 2009.

== Casting ==
Carol Willesee was initially hired for the "pivotal role of foster mother, and earth mother" Pippa Fletcher. In his book Super Aussie Soaps, Andrew Mercado opined that casting the then wife of current affairs show host, Mike Willesee, was a publicity dream. Of Willesee's casting, producer John Holmes said "She had just started acting and was pretty raw, but she had a warmth about her." When filming began, the Seven Network became worried because Willesee had not signed a contract. The actress later revealed she had a verbal agreement that she could have time off during the school holidays, as well as later starts and early finishes, so she could spend time with her family. The network realised that that situation would not work for a show scheduled to film five episodes per week and they decided to recast the character and reshoot the footage Willesee had already filmed. Holmes explained that it would have been "irresponsible" to allow an unsigned actress to keep filming when she could walk out at any time.

The pivotal role of Pippa was then given to Vanessa Downing at very short notice and the actress had to juggle a theatre production in which she was appearing along with the filming of the pilot episode of Home and Away. Downing made her debut as Pippa on 17 January 1988. She appeared as Pippa until 1990, when she suddenly quit the series, apparently due to missing working with her former co-star Roger Oakley, who played her on-screen husband Tom. Producers did not want to kill off the character, as she was crucial to the storyline, so they recast the part instead. Auditions were held and it came down to two actresses: Jackie Woodburne and Debra Lawrance. Lawrance commented: "We were, and still are, very dear friends. She and I were short-listed together and after our call back audition we caught up for coffee. We both genuinely agreed that we didn't mind if the other got it." Lawrance won the role and immediately took over from Downing in July 1990. There was no break in the storyline for the character; when Downing departed, Lawrance appeared as Pippa in the following episode with no attempt to explain the sudden change of appearance. Lawrance remained in the role until 1998 and has subsequently returned to guest star.

== Development ==
Following the death of Tom, writers began developing a new romance for Pippa with Michael Ross (Dennis Coard). A writer from TV Week revealed that writers would continue to explore the story in 1991. They explained that Pippa would struggle with her feelings and wonder if she is rushing into another relationship too soon after Tom's death. Writers also created problems, first with Pippa's foster child Sally Fletcher (Kate Ritchie). She believes that Michael is trying to replace Tom's role as her foster father. Producers also cast Belinda Giblin to play Michael's ex-wife Cynthia Ross. They added that Cynthia would "turn up in Summer Bay to wreak havoc".

== Storylines ==
Pippa is the daughter of Bert (Kevin Healy; Peter Collingwood) and Coral King (Jessica Noad). Pippa married her brother Danny's (John Clayton) army friend Tom Fletcher and they later foster Frank Morgan (Alex Papps) after his parents Les (Mario Kery) and Helena (Lee Sanderson) are incapable of looking after him. As time passes, they take in more children from various homes and institutions: Carly Morris (Sharyn Hodgson), Lynn Davenport (Helena Bozich), Sally and Steven Matheson (Adam Willits). Tom is retrenched at the start of 1988 and the family leave the city and relocate to Summer Bay and buy the local caravan park from Alf Stewart (Ray Meagher). Local troublemaker Bobby Simpson (Nicolle Dickson) causes problems for the family by picking fights with Carly. After Bobby is cleared of several crimes, the Fletchers agree to foster her, much to ire of their neighbour, Donald Fisher (Norman Coburn). Pippa takes a part-time job at Ailsa Hogan's (Judy Nunn) general store and later discovers she is pregnant, despite Tom having a vasectomy. This is a concern as Pippa had rheumatic fever as a child; it weakened her heart and doctors warned her that she should not have children. Danny visits for ANZAC Day, as he and Tom both served in the Vietnam War. He asks Pippa to help him commit suicide as he was left in a wheelchair from the war, which she refuses. Danny later gains a new lease on life and leaves.

Pippa then gives birth to a son, Christopher (Ashleigh Bell-Weir), and a christening is held. Pippa and Tom later adopt Sally. When Tom suffers a heart attack and is hospitalized for several weeks, Pippa begins to feel the strain. Coral visits and offers to help out physically and financially. It soon emerges that Coral is shoplifting and she tells Pippa she misses the standard of living prior to Bert's retirement. When Tom recovers and returns home, he accuses Pippa of having an affair with local shark hunter Zac Burgess (Mark Conroy), and their marriage undergoes a testing time but they manage to put it behind them. Pippa is left devastated when Tom suffers a second heart attack and dies. Michael Ross arrives in Summer Bay six months later and Pippa is clearly attracted to him but feels guilty as Tom has been dead for only a few months. Despite resistance from Sally and Michael's son Haydn Ross (Andrew Hill), Pippa and Michael marry.

Pippa then falls pregnant again and gives birth to another son, Dale (Olivia Alfonzetti). Several months later, Dale dies of SIDS (Sudden Infant Death Syndrome). The family are in debt, which is exacerbated when Michael takes out a loan to pay off Haydn's gambling debts. This leads to arguments, and Pippa and Michael separate over Christmas 1994, but reconcile after Sally runs away. Michael drowns while trying to save Sam Marshall (Ryan Clark) during a storm which floods the Bay. Pippa then builds up a strong bond with fellow widow Angel Parrish (Melissa George) whose husband Shane (Dieter Brummer) had also died several months earlier. Pippa is later awarded the Medal of the Order of Australia (OAM) for her years of service as a foster carer. Ian Routledge (Patrick Dickson) begins staying at the caravan park and takes an interest in Pippa, wanting her to come travelling with him. She declines but when Ian returns a few months later, she accepts his offer and she, Christopher and Ian leave the Bay to live in the Carrington Ranges. Sally later attends their wedding the following year. The next year, Pippa, alongside many other past residents, return to Summer Bay for Sally's wedding to Kieran Fletcher (Spencer McLaren). After Sally jilts Kieran, Pippa comforts her. Pippa then sells the house to the Sutherland family before departing.

Two years later, Pippa appears on a video with a special message she made for Sally during Summer Bay's 150th anniversary celebrations. The next year, she and Christopher (now played by Rian McLean) return for Sally's wedding to Flynn Saunders (Joel McIlroy). Two years later, she returns for Alf's 60th birthday celebrations. Pippa returns again to comfort Sally, following Flynn's death of cancer and the next year when Sally's wedding to Brad Armstrong (Chris Sadrinna) fails. Pippa returns twice following this, first at Sally's bedside after she is stabbed where she meets Sally's long-lost twin brother, Miles Copeland (Josh Quong Tart), and second two months later to help Sally with her departure from Summer Bay. When Irene Roberts (Lynne McGranger) leaves on a trip the following year, Alf asks Pippa to look after Geoff (Lincoln Lewis) and Annie Campbell (Charlotte Best), and she stays for a week.

== Reception ==
Pippa was placed sixth in TV Week's list of the "Top 10 Aussie TV mums". A writer for the publication said "Kind-hearted Pippa helped dozens of fosters kids, along with her own son, Dale, get on the straight and narrow with reliable doses of tough love. Pippa oversaw Sally's (Kate Ritchie) progress from child to independent woman, and once Sally was on her feet, Pippa left town to make a new life. Being a good mum, Pippa has returned for all the family's rites of passage." Writers for the publication later included Pippa at number six in their feature on the "Top 20 Home And Away characters of all time". They wrote that the character was "kind-hearted", but had "more than her share of grief".

Donna Hay from What's on TV included Pippa and Michael in their "marriages made in heaven" feature. Hay stated that "who'd have believed Pippa Fletcher would ever find someone to take the place of her husband – let alone take on her foster kids? But then Michael came along and won her heart." Hay added that despite their families initial disapproval, the duo's "love conquered all".

The episode featuring the death of Pippa's new-born son, Dale, won the Australian Film Institute award for Best Episode In A Television Drama Serial in 1993. It was presented to executive producer, Andrew Howie. Jason Herbison from All About Soap described Pippa stating she is "Summer Bay's original foster mum. Always on hand with cups of hot chocolate and words of wisdom."
