= Fay Kelton =

Australian actress (born 1940/41)

- Born: 1940-1941 (aged 84-86); Tasmania, Australia
- Occupations: Radio, theatre and television actress
- Years active: 1960–2001 (Theatre and television)

Fay Kelton (born in Tasmania, Australia between 1940 and 1941) is an Australian former actress of radio, theatre and television, she relocated to Melbourne in her teens. She was a regular performer on the ABC radio serial Blue Hills (1949–1976), and also appeared in the shorter serials for commercial radio Danse Macabre and Forests of the Night.

Kelton also appeared in numerous television films, particular in her early career and guested in small roles in TV series, including a part based on the historical figure of Mary Bryant in the 1963 television series The Hungry Ones with Leonard Teale. She appeared in Nice Day at the Office, Cop Shop, Prisoner, A Country Practice and Home and Away.

== Biography ==
Kelton worked as a radio actress before becoming a theatre and television actress in 1960, making her television acting debut in the live television play Who Killed Kovali? on the 13 July 1960. This was followed by, amongst other productions, the television film The End Begins (1961). Two years later, she was cast as Mary Bryant in the television mini-series The Hungry Ones, with co-star Leonard Teale, and followed this with appearances in The Gioconda Smile (1963) and A Man for All Seasons (1964). Kelton played 'the daughter of a miser' in Cross of Gold which aired in October, 1965.

She made eight guest appearances on Homicide between 1964 and 1971. She also made one-time appearances on the Australian series Dynasty and The Comedy Game, the latter performance leading to her role as Vicki Short in the spinoff A Nice Day at the Office in 1972.

Having moved from Melbourne to Sydney the previous year, she also performed on the ABC radio serial Blue Hills (as well as commercial radio serials Danse Macabre and Forests of the Night) and in the Hugh Leonard farce The Patrick Pearce Motel. She was working seven days a week and up to 16 hours a day. In 1974, she had a leading role in the televised play The Misanthrope.

Kelton guest starred in Ryan, Matlock Police, Division 4 and Power Without Glory. In 1981, she was cast as Alison Page on the soap opera Prisoner. Her character was introduced as a troubled housewife who is sent to prison for shoplifting. Despondent over the separation from her family and bullying from the other women, especially Doreen Burns (Colette Mann), she attempts suicide. Kelton later returned to stage acting and performed for the Northside Theatre Company in Sydney for much of the 1980s.

After a five-year absence from television, she appeared on A Country Practice in 1986 and the television miniseries Emma: Queen of the South Seas in 1988. In 1994, she had a recurring role as Anne Harris on Home and Away. She returned to acting once more to guest star on All Saints in 2001.

== Filmography ==
Title	Year	Role
Who Killed Kovali (TV Film)	1960	Jill Masters
The First Joanna (TV film)	1961	Augusta
Quite Night (TV Film)	1961	Nurse Sparrow
The Ides of March	1961	Pompela
The End Begins (TV Film)	1961	Valerie Hollis
Boy Round the Corner (TV Film)	1962	Sue
Fury in Petticoats (TV Film)	1962	Fuegia Basket
The Hungry Ones (TV Mini-series)	1963	Mary Bryant - Mary Broad
A Man for All Seasons (TV Film)	1963	Margaret More
The Gioconda Smile (TV Film)	1963	Doris Mead
Corruption in the Palace of Justice (TV Film)	1964	Elena
The Tower (TV Film)	1964	Megan
Romanoff and Juliet (TV Film)	1965	Martha
. Cross of Gold (TV Film)	1965	Eugenie Grandet
Topaze (TV Film)	1966	Ernestine
A Phoenix To Frequent (TV Film)	1966	Doto
Australian Playhouse (TV series)	1966	2 episodes Captain Pamela - Evelyn Fisher
A Ride n the Big Dipper (TV Film)	1967	
Homicide (TV series)	1964-1971	Mrs. Forrseter - Sue Middleton - Betty Foster
Dynasty (TVV series)	1971	Helene Dawson
The Godfathers	1971	Helen Fraser
The Comedy Game (TV series)	1971	Vicki Short
A Nice Day at the Office (TV series)	1972	Vicki Short
Ryan (TV series)	1973	Jean Thompson
Matlock Police	1972-1974	Jean Baker - Carol Collins
The Misanthorpe (TV Film)	1972	
Division 4 (TYV series)	1972-1975	Penelope Brown - June Garrett - Maureen Hall
Between the Legend (TV series)	1975	
Power Without Glory (TV mini-series)	1976	Marjorie West
Cop Shop (TV series)	1979	Catherine Temple
Prisoner	1981	13 episodes Allison Page
A Country Practice	1986	Denise Jackson
Emma: Queen of the South Seas (TV mini-series)	1988	Aunt Elizabeth
Home and Away (TV series)	1994-1995	Anne Harris (10 episodes)
All Saints (TV series)	2001	Carol Singleton
