= Donald Fisher (Home and Away) =

- Home and Away character
- Portrayed by: Norman Coburn
- Duration: 1988–2005, 2007
- First appearance: 17 January 1988
- Last appearance: 11 September 2007
- Introduced by: Alan Bateman (1988); Julie McGuaran (2003); Cameron Welsh (2007)
- Book appearances: The Bobby Simpson Story; Scandal at Summer Bay
In-universe information
- Occupation: Deputy Principal of Summer Bay High; Principal of Summer Bay High
- Mother: Isobel Du Pre
- Brothers: Clive Fisher
- Sisters: Mary Croft
- Wife: Barbara Stewart (1970s–1984); Marilyn Chambers (1996–2001); June Reynolds (2003–2007)
- Sons: Alan Fisher; Byron Fisher
- Daughters: Rebecca Nash; Bobby Simpson
- Grandsons: Seb Miller
- Nephews: David Croft
- Nieces: Lucinda Croft
- Other relatives: Tamara Simpson

Donald Fisher is a fictional character in the Australian television soap opera Home and Away played by actor Norman Coburn as a regular character, from the soap's inception in 1988 to 2003. The role initially had the name Raymond Phillips; however, producers changed the name prior to final filming. He acts as the main antagonist in the show's pilot episode, willing to go to any lengths to ensure local teen Bobby Simpson is locked up; however, his character soon softens. He spends almost his entire tenure on the show as the Principal of Summer Bay (at which he is given his iconic nickname "Flathead"), where he is stern but fair to all the students. Although departing as a main character in 2003, Coburn has since returned for brief appearances in 2004, 2005 and 2007. Coburn's long-running portrayal of Fisher earned him a place in the 2002 Guinness World Records alongside castmates Ray Meagher and Kate Ritchie as the longest serving cast member of an Australian soap opera.

== Casting ==
When actor Norman Coburn received the role of "money-grabbing politician" Donald Fisher, he thought it would be for a short stint. He stayed with the show as it provided him with financial security for his family. While filming the pilot in 1987, the producers decided they needed to change the character's mean persona and job, as they thought he would be "more useful" as the headmaster of Summer Bay High. Coburn explained, "They came to me halfway through and said, 'We don't want him to be a villain any more – can you soften him up and make him a bit nicer?' I responded, 'It's a bit late now!'"

Coburn chose to leave the serial in 2003, after 15 years in the role. He felt that he had done everything he wanted to do and it was time to move on. He told the producers of his decision with a year left on his contract. He joked, "they kind of brushed me aside in the hope I would forget about it". The writers gave the character a "sedate ending", which saw him move away with his new partner June Reynolds (Rowena Wallace), so that they could bring him back for guest appearances in the future. Coburn filmed a brief return in the same year and agreed to return in 2004.

In 2015, Home and Away producers planned to bring the character back into the series. Writers created a month long euthanasia story in which Donald would have been suffering with dementia. In addition he would seek the help of his friend Alf Stewart (Ray Meagher) to die. In 2022, the show's former script executive Dan Bennett revealed that Donald's return had been written but was blocked by Seven Network. Bennett claimed that network executives believed "no one would care" about the story and forced its cancellation. Other parts of the story continued on-screen without Donald's presence.

== Storylines ==
Donald is first seen when he arrives at the Caravan Park of Summer Bay House and informs Neville McPhee (Frank Lloyd) that he was recently burgled and it is clear that he suspects local tearaway Bobby Simpson (Nicolle Dickson) of being the culprit. Donald welcomes the Fletcher family, on their arrival to Summer Bay and inadvertently manages to scare young Sally Keating (Kate Ritchie).

Donald later is accused of poisoning Eric, the Fletcher's pet dog, and Jessie, Nico Pappas' (Nicholas Papademetriou) cow, but these deeds are later revealed to be those of Donald's superior, Walter Bertram (Owen Weingott), who had been running around in the guise of "The Nutter", following a brain tumour. With Walter out of action, Donald is promoted to headmaster of Summer Bay High.

When Donald's ex-wife Barbara (Barbara Stevens) arrives to take a teaching post at the school, he is surprised and when their son Alan (Simon Kay) arrives to repeat Year 12, Donald becomes stressed as his relationship with Alan has deteriorated in the four years since they last saw each other. Alan begins acting up at school but Donald softens when he finds out Alan has a brain tumour, but lashes out when Alan provokes him one day. Just when it seems father and son have patched things up, Alan dies of an aneurysm.

At the start of 1989, Bobby begins searching for her biological parents. Donald, after finding out his former sister-in-law, Morag Bellingham (Cornelia Frances) is Bobby's mother, visits Morag in hospital and asks if he is Bobby's father. Morag confirms he is but Donald wants this kept a secret. After Donald refuses to sell his house to the Macklin development at Morag's suggestion, she threatens to tell Bobby the truth. Donald remains unflappable and refuses to change his stance on the matter. After the truth comes out, Donald and Bobby have a shaky start but ultimately become close and she begins calling him "Dad".

The following Year, Tom Fletcher (Roger Oakley) dies and Donald offers support to his widow, Pippa (Vanessa Downing). Donald soon begins making romantic advances but is rebuffed. When Lucinda Croft (Dee Smart), Donald's niece arrives, he is quick to play matchmaker between her and local constable Nick Parrish (Bruce Roberts). After Nick's relationship with Lou fizzles out, Donald and Nick remain friends after Nick stays on in the house with his wayward teenage brother, Shane (Dieter Brummer). Donald later becomes the guardian of teenage runaway Angel Brooks (Melissa George), who later begins dating Shane.

Donald's world is shattered when Bobby dies in a boating accident aged 22 and tries to take responsibility for his adoptive grandson, Sam Marshall (Ryan Clark (who calls him "Uncle Donald"), but is unable to so sends him to live with Pippa and her new husband. Fisher celebrates his 50th birthday in February 1995. When Shane and Angel marry, Donald is present to give Angel away. Later that year Donald loses his home and his last remaining photos of Bobby in a bushfire caused by Jack Wilson (Daniel Amalm).

Donald begins dating local beautician Marilyn Chambers (Emily Symons), and they later become engaged despite Marilyn being 27 years old and him being 51. They eventually marry in 1996. Shortly after the wedding, Donald's daughter Rebecca (Belinda Emmett) returns to the Bay full-time to teach at the school. When Rebecca marries Travis Nash (Nic Testoni) on the beach in the 1997 season finale, Donald is present as celebrant. After Pippa leaves, Donald becomes Sam's guardian when he fails to adjust to Travis and Rebecca as his new foster parents

Marilyn later falls pregnant and gives birth to a son, Byron Vincent, named after Vinnie Patterson (Ryan Kwanten) who illegally sped through traffic to get Marilyn to hospital. After developing post-natal depression, Donald was left alone with Byron. When Marilyn returns a few months later, she feels inadequate as Donald has hired Nanny Ellen Porter (Anne Grigg) but later grow to love Byron. This is only to last a few months as Byron is diagnosed with cancer. The Fishers leave with Byron for America to get treatment, but Byron later dies. Marilyn, unable to cope, leaves Donald and he returns to Australia alone.

In 2000, Donald is pleased to be given the honour of walking Sally down the aisle at her wedding to Keiran Fletcher but ultimately hands the honour over to Sally's foster brothers Steven Matheson and Frank Morgan. When the 2000 Olympics begin Donald has the honour of carrying the Olympic torch through Summer Bay, but has it switched with a fake by several students. Alf notices and tells him "Don, stop! It's the wrong flamin' flame!". Following Sam's departure, Donald feels alone again. Seb Miller (Mitch Firth), a dyslexic student, began questioning Fisher and asking questions about Alan. It is later revealed Seb's mother Anna (Elizabeth Maywald) had a one-night stand with Alan at a party in 1985, resulting in Seb's conception, and Anna, who had been dying had wanted to tell Donald. Donald does not want to believe this at first but a DNA test confirms Seb is, in fact, his grandson. Donald and Seb later build a close relationship and live together. Later in the year, Donald goes to London along with Irene and her foster children, Will (Zac Drayson), Hayley (Bec Cartwright) and Nick Smith (Chris Egan) to attend the launch of his book Letter to Byron. While there, Donald notices Marilyn watching from the shadows and runs after her. After catching up with Marilyn, the two have a conversation about the events of the last several years and agree to part amicably.

In 2003, Donald decides to retire from teaching and leaves the Bay for the Whitsundays with his new partner, June Reynolds. Later that year, Donald returns to be the celebrant at Sally's wedding to local doctor, Flynn Saunders (Joel McIlroy).

Donald returns when he hears Seb and his girlfriend Jade Sutherland (Kate Garven) were injured in a car crash caused by Duncan (Brendan McKensy), Alf's son and Seb's first cousin removed. Seb is left paralysed and Donald offers to fly him back to the Whitsundays and look after him. Donald also returns in 2005 for Alf's 60th birthday party where he forgives Duncan after he apologises about the accident he caused the previous year. In late 2007, Donald returns to Summer Bay as the new Vice Principal of Summer Bay (ironically working for Sally, who served under him during his tenure as Principal) but he soon resigns, saying that he cannot handle the students anymore. He decides to retire yet again, this time for good and he got the next available flight back to the Whitsundays, never to return to Summer Bay. Donald reveals he has since divorced June and has gone bankrupt. After borrowing some money from Alf and Morag, Donald goes to visit his former wife, Marilyn, in England after learning she has cancer.

== Reception ==
The episode featuring the earthquake where Donald and several other students were at risk in the school was nominated for an Australian Film Institute Award. The episode featuring Donald facing backlash over allowing Marat/Sade to be performed at the school won writer Linda Stainton the Australian Writers Guild Award in 1998. Channel 5 chose Donald's wedding to Marilyn, Donald's disappearance at sea, his departure and 2007 return among their best episodes.

During his review of the show's first episode for The Sydney Morning Herald, Robin Oliver called Fisher "the town nasty" and noted that the script made him "too vile to be readily acceptable", however, later scripts saw him softened.

Brian Courtis of The Age criticised Donald's exit in 2003: "Don certainly merited more than this teary-eyed, Goodbye-Mr-Chips dismissal. Old "Flathead", never happy at the cheeriest of times, has reason to look sad and sorry in his farewell episode of Home And Away (7pm, Seven). It is sloppy, sentimental, touching... showing almost unspeakable verisimilitude to real life. There is a last dollop of poetry for his final class of kids, an endless minor-key tinkling of the piano as Fisher's groper-wide mouth gulps at the thought of leaving his beloved waters, and then, with students, staff and locals, the big, emotional, surprise farewell party before he tootles off to Queensland, Valhalla of all Australian soapie greats." Virgin Media described Donald as having "a fearsome demeanor" and "always had the interests of his pupils at heart."
