= Shane Parrish =

Fictional character from the Australian soap opera Home and Away

- Home and Away character
- Portrayed by: Dieter Brummer
- Duration: 1992–1996
- First appearance: 28 May 1992
- Last appearance: 13 March 1996
- Introduced by: Des Monaghan
In-universe information
- Occupation: Student (1992-94); Caravan Park Assistant (1995-96)
- Father: Philip Parrish
- Mother: Ros Parrish
- Brothers: Nick Parrish
- Wife: Angel Brooks (1995-96)
- Daughters: Shane Parrish Jr.
- Stepsons: Dylan Parrish

Shane Parrish is a fictional character from the Australian soap opera Home and Away, played by Dieter Brummer. He made his first on-screen appearance on 28 May 1992 and he departed on 13 March 1996.

== Casting ==
In 1992, actor Dieter Brummer successfully auditioned for the part of Shane. Brummer was fifteen years old and had been studying drama at high school. Brummer has said the recognition was instant and admitted he found the attention "quite bizarre".

In 1995, Brummer quit the serial after he decided Shane's story had come to its natural conclusion. He also admitted he had become bored of the role and working with the same cast members. Speaking of his departure, Brummer stated: "I know there's life after Home And Away and I'm not afraid of it. Now it's time it's time to move on." He filmed his final scenes in December 1995, with Shane's departure airing in early 1996.

== Character development ==
When he was first introduced into the serial he was portrayed as a "bad boy". Brummer said he was fun to play because "he was a bad boy - stealing cars and setting fire to things." Brummer felt that Shane's relationship with Angel turned him into a "nancy boy" and a "wuss". He also thought the changes to the character were negative and said "You don't even talk to anyone else. There's no interaction with other characters." Brummer has said that Shane had "a beginning, a middle and an end" portrayed throughout his duration.

In the buildup to Shane's exit storyline he is involved in a motor bike accident. He lies in a coma and has to have his spleen removed. Dr. Kelly Watson (Katrina Hobbs) performed the operation, but he later dies from septicaemia when he cuts himself on a nail. Hobbs told Fairfax Media she was given the nickname "Doctor Death" for her role in his demise. Melissa George who plays on-screen wife Angel Parrish, said the scenes involving his death were "gut-wrenching stuff".

== Storylines ==
Shane makes his mark on Summer Bay by breaking into Donald Fisher's (Norman Coburn) house, where he is found by his older brother, Nick (Bruce Roberts) who lives there with his fiancé Lucinda Croft (Dee Smart), Donald's niece. Shane discovers Lucinda is cheating on Nick with her ex-boyfriend Ryan Lee (Alistair MacDougall) and begins a campaign against them, culminating in Shane sinking Ryan's car. Shane quickly befriends Damian Roberts (Matt Doran) and leads him into trouble. The boys compete for the affections of new student Kelly Chan (Theresa Wong) and ultimately Shane wins her, causing a rift. Kelly leaves and the boys are friends again. Shane makes an enemy of Peter "Tug" O'Neale (Tristan Bancks), who had previously given Damian a hard time and Tug later frames Shane for burglary. Shane's name is eventually cleared after serving several weeks in a detention centre.

Angel Brooks sells Shane some tickets to see Frente! but they turn out to be fake and he hunts her down. It later emerges Angel is homeless and she soon moves in with Donald, Nick and Shane. There is a great deal of animosity between Shane and Angel at first but they become a couple after sharing a kiss. When Shane is cast as the lead in a local musical opposite Tug's girlfriend Sarah Thompson (Laura Vasquez), he uses this opportunity to wind up Tug. On the night of the performance, Shane overdoes the kissing scene leading Tug to get up from his seat, storm the stage and punch Shane. The Animosity between Shane and Tug later thaws. Shane is shocked when he reads Angel's file on a computer during work experience at Yabbie Creek police station where he is shadowing his brother Nick. It transpires she fell pregnant at 14 and gave birth to a son, Dylan and surrendered custody to Dylan's father Paul Harris (Ramsay Everingham) and his mother, Anne (Fay Kelton). Shane agrees to go with Angel to track down Dylan after much persuasion. After some difficulty, Shane eventually bonds with Dylan.

When Jack Wilson (Daniel Amalm) arrives in the Bay, he makes a play for Angel, which puts Shane's nose out of joint. To fix Jack, Shane gives him false directions to Angel's room. Jack climbs in the window and attempts to get into bed with Angel only to find he is in Donald's room. Shane proposes and Angel accepts despite many people thinking they are too young and have not finished Year 12. Nick receives an overseas posting and Shane is distraught at his brother's departure and becomes moody. Shane's mood is not helped when his mother Ros (Angela Punch McGregor) arrives shortly after his father dies. Things come to ahead when Shane feels Ros is interfering in his relationship with Angel and asks her to leave. The wedding is pushed back when Alf Stewart (Ray Meagher) accidentally runs over Angel, leaving her temporarily paralysed and Shane upset. The wedding goes ahead and Angel is guided down the aisle by Donald and the couple take their vows. Shane and Angel later move into an old house which they renovate.

Shannon Reed (Isla Fisher) develops a schoolgirl crush on Shane and uses the opportunity to babysit Dylan to get close to him. After Shane rebuffs Shannon when she kisses him, She later tells Angel she and Shane have been having an affair which Shane denies but Angel leaves taking Dylan with her and is later caught in a seaplane crash with local teacher Teresa Lynch (Diane Craig). Shane joins the search party and Angel, Dylan and Teresa are found. One night while entertaining guests, Shane goes out to pick up some ice cream but is knocked off his motorbike and left for dead. He undergoes a splenectomy and makes a recovery. To celebrate Shane and Angel's first anniversary, the couple and Dylan take a trip to the headland. Shane feels sick and collapses, Angel screams for help but Shane dies. The cause of his death is septicaemia caused by an infection that never really healed by cutting it on wire. Shane is cremated and his ashes are scattered at sea and several months later, Angel gives birth to a baby girl, named after her father.

== Reception ==
At the 1996 Inside Soap Awards Shane was named the most missed soap opera character. The two episodes featuring the school musical where Shane's feud with Tug O'Neale reached its climax were nominated for "Best Episode in a Television Drama Serial" at the Australian Film Institute awards in 1993. For the role of Shane, Brummer was nominated for the Gold Logie and Silver Logie Awards for "Most Popular Actor" in 1994, however failed to win. However he went on to win the "Most Popular Actor" silver Logie Award in 1995 and 1996. In 1993 and 1994, the role saw Brummer voted as "The Prince of Soap" by Dolly magazine's readers. TV Fix chose his unexpected death scenes as number seven on their list of "Most shocking TV deaths". The role saw Brummer become popular amongst teenage girls who considered him to be a "heart-throb". He would often receive high volumes of fan-mail from females fans. He has been described as a "do-gooder bimboy" British newspaper the Daily Mirror. Shane and Angel's wedding helped boost ratings for the serial with 592,000 viewers watching the episode. Subsequently, the ratings continued to remain steady whilst their romance continued to play out. The episode featuring Shane's death drew a peak audience of 474,000 viewers, beating Sale of the Century on rival channel Nine Network. The episode also earned writer and director, Sean Nash the Australian Writers' Guild award for "Best Episode in a Television Serial" in 1996. In the same year, Series producer Russell Webb was awarded "Best Television Drama Series" by The Australian Film Institute for the episode. Discussing Shane's wedding to Angel, a reporter from Soap World wrote this "Summer Bay spectacular is one of TV's top weddings, but it wasn't to last... sob!"
