= Debra Lawrance =

Australian actress (born 1957)

- Born: Debra Lawrance; 1 January 1957 (age 69); Melbourne, Victoria, Australia
- Education: NIDA (1977)
- Occupations: Television and film actress
- Years active: 1976–present
- Known for: Home and Away as Pippa Ross (1990–2009); Blue Heelers as Grace Curtis (1994–2004); Please Like Me as Rose (2013–2016)
- Spouse: Dennis Coard (m. 1992)
- Children: 2

Debra Lawrance (born 1 January 1957) is an Australian actress. She is best known for her role on Home and Away, as Pippa Ross, which she played from 1990 to 1998 and in a number of subsequent return appearances, the most recent being in 2009.

Lawrance is also known for her role as Rose in Please Like Me, for which she won an AACTA Award for Best Performance in a Television Comedy and a Logie Award for Most Outstanding Supporting Actress.

== Early life and education ==
Debra Lawrance was born in Melbourne, Victoria and was the second youngest of six children. In 1975 Lawrance started studying a Bachelor of Dramatic Art at NIDA, alongside such alumni as Mel Gibson, Steve Bisley, Judy Davis, Sally McKenzie and Robert Menzies. She graduated in 1977.

== Career ==
=== Television and film ===
Lawrance has appeared in a number of roles including The Sullivans as Prue Waterman (1976), in Skyways as Sheila Turner, A Country Practice as Kerry Burgess (1982), Bellamy (1981) as Lisa and Sons and Daughters as Lisa Cook (1983–1984).

Lawrance had a more permanent role in Prisoner from 1985 to 1986 as Daphne Graham, after having had minor roles including as a Nurse and Trainee Prisoner Officer Sally Dean much earlier in the series.

Lawrance featured in miniseries The Last Outlaw, (1980) a series about Ned Kelly, and feature films Next of Kin and Fluteman (both 1982) and Silver City (1984).

Lawrance's big break was a lead role in The Fast Lane, a widely successful ABC comedy. Her success led to her appearance in the film Evil Angels (released as A Cry in the Dark outside of Australia and New Zealand) starring Meryl Streep. Lawrance also appeared in Two Brothers Running with Tom Conti.

In July 1990 Lawrance was cast in Home and Away, taking over the role of Pippa Fletcher (later Ross) from Vanessa Downing. Lawrance left the main cast in 1998, but has made returning guest appearances over the years, the last being in 2009. In 2023 Lawrance gave an extensive interview with Talking Prisoner, where she revealed that she was still close friends with many of the cast.

Lawrance subsequently starred in Blue Heelers, in the recurring role of Reverend Grace Curtis, Tom Croydon's ill-fated wife from 2001 to 2004.

From 2013 to 2016, Lawrance played Rose, the mother of the protagonist Josh Thomas, in the comedy drama Please Like Me, appearing in all four seasons of the show, during which her character dealt with divorce and mental illness. Her performance was met with critical acclaim. She won an AACTA Award for Best Performance in a Television Comedy at the 4th AACTA Awards in 2015 for her part in a two-hander episode (with Thomas) in the show's second season.

In 2018, Lawrance read Charlotte Voake's Ginger in Play School Story Time on ABC Kids.

She briefly joined the cast of Neighbours in 2018 as Liz Conway, the sister of Susan Kennedy.

In early 2023, it was revealed Lawrance had joined the cast of a new crime drama on the Nine Network called Human Error.

In June 2024, Lawrance was named as part of the cast for the second season of the Stan series Scrublands. The same year, she starred in the feature film Ricky Stanicky.

=== Reality TV ===
In 2017, Lawrance appeared as a celebrity contestant on Hell's Kitchen Australia. Lawrance won the series, winning $50,000 for her nominated charity Ovarian Cancer Australia.

From 2 April 2023, Lawrance appeared as a contestant in the ninth season of I'm a Celebrity...Get Me Out of Here!. As on Hell's Kitchen Australia, Lawrance's nominated charity was Ovarian Cancer Australia. Lawrance was eliminated fifth, on 23 April 2023.

=== Theatre ===
Lawrance's theatre credits include the London tour of Jack Davis' No Sugar, the role of Vi in the Melbourne Theatre Company production of The Memory of Water, the 2009 tour of Steel Magnolias in the role of M'lyn, and the title role in the 2010 tour of Driving Miss Daisy. From 2019 to 2024, she played Minerva McGonagall in the stage production of Harry Potter and the Cursed Child both Melbourne and in the UK.

=== Teaching ===
In 2005, Lawrance began teaching communication skills for NIDA’s Corporate Performance Program. Since 2007, she has been working with her own business teaching vocal communication skills. Her clients include Monash University, Melbourne Business School, NSW RTA and various corporate businesses.

== Awards and nominations ==
Year	Work	Award	Category	Result
2014	Please Like Me	Equity Ensemble Awards	Outstanding Performance by an Ensemble in a Comedy Series	Nominated
2015	Please Like Me	AACTA Awards	Best Performance in a Television Comedy	Won
2017	Please Like Me	AACTA Awards	Best Performance in a Television Comedy	Nominated
2017	Debra Lawrance	Logie Awards	Silver Logie for Most Outstanding Supporting Actress	Won
2017	Please Like Me	International Online Cinema Awards (INOCA)	Best Supporting Actress in a Comedy Series	Nominated

== Personal life ==
Lawrance met her husband Dennis Coard when he was cast as Pippa's second husband on Home and Away as Michael Ross. They married in 1992 and have two children, daughter Grace (born 1992) and son William (born 1999). Lawrance experienced four miscarriages before their son William was born.

== Filmography ==
=== Film ===
Year	Title	Role	Type
1982	Next of Kin	Carol	Feature film
1982	Fluteman	Sally Cooper	Feature film
1984	Silver City	Helena	Feature film
1986	What's The Difference	Angela Burke	TV film
1988	Evil Angels (aka A Cry in the Dark)	Sally Lowe	Feature film
1988	Two Brothers Running	Pat	Feature film
1988	The Seanachie	Joanna	Film short
2007	The Jammed	DIMIA Case Officer	Feature film
2012	Jack Irish: Bad Debts	Jack's Secretary	TV film
2016	The Machine	Joan	Film short
2017	And Through The Music Ended, We Danced on Through The Night	Joanne	Film short
2018	Calling	Barbara Helm	Film short
2018	Jeremy's Cybele Makeover	Bec	Film short
2024	Ricky Stanicky	Mrs Levine	Feature film

=== Television ===
Year	Title	Role	Notes	Ref
1976	The Sullivans	Prue Waterman	1 episode	
1978	Glenview High	Jane	1 episode	
1978–1981	Cop Shop	Various	12 episodes	
1979	Skyways	Sheila Turner	1 episode	
1979	Ride on Stranger	Jenny	Miniseries, 1 episode	
1980	Skyways	Samantha	5 episodes	
1980	The Last Outlaw	Maggie Kelly	Miniseries, 4 episodes	
1980–1985	Prisoner	Nurse / Sally Dean / Daphne Graham	58 episodes	
1981	Bellamy	Lisa	1 episode	
1981	Holiday Island	Michelle Costello / Penny Fuller	2 episodes	
1981	I Can Jump Puddles	Nurse Conrad	Miniseries, 2 episodes	
1982	Holiday Island		2 episodes	
1982, 1986	A Country Practice	Kerry Burgess / Anna Harris	4 episodes	
1983	Carson's Law	Jessie	3 episodes	
1983–1984	Sons and Daughters	Lisa Cook	17 episodes	
1985–1986	The Fast Lane	Pat	20 episodes	
1990–1998, 2000, 2002–2003, 2005–2009	Home and Away	Pippa Fletcher / Pippa Ross	1353 Episodes	
1993	At Home	Guest	1 episode	
1999, 2001–2004	Blue Heelers	Deborah Williams (1999) & Reverend Grace Curtis (2001–2004)	26 episodes	
2000	The Games	Sponsor	1 episode	
2008	Satisfaction	Margaret	1 episode	
2012	Miss Fisher's Murder Mysteries	Mrs. Mobbs	1 episode	
2013	It's a Date	Bron	1 episode	
2013–2016	Please Like Me	Mum	29 episodes	
2015	House Husbands	Judge Kummerow	2 episodes	
2016	The Doctor Blake Mysteries	Majorie Gilmore	1 episode	
2016	Wentworth	Faith Proctor	1 episode	
2018	True Story with Hamish & Andy	Aunt Beth	1 episode	
2018	Rosehaven	Sandra	1 episode	
2018	Play School Story Time	Narrator (Ginger)	1 episode	
2018–2019	Neighbours	Liz Conway	14 episodes	
2019	Get Krack!n	Tikki Cheeseman	2 episodes	
2021	Fisk	May	5 episodes	
2021	Ms Fisher's Modern Murder Mysteries	Henrietta Osborn	1 episode	
2021	Clickbait	Principal Heller	Miniseries, 1 episode	
2022	Shut Up	Marion	6 episodes	
2022–2023	Five Bedrooms	Pam Fitzsimons	5 episodes	
2023	Class of '07	Sister Bicky	5 episodes	
2023	Five Bedrooms	Pam Fitzsimons	5 episodes	
2023	I'm A Celebrity, Get Me Out of Here	Contestant	17 episodes	
2023	Turn Up the Volume		Miniseries	
2024	Human Error	Camille	3 episodes	
2025	Darby and Joan	Anna Bairnsdale	Season 2, 1 episode	
2025	Scrublands: Sliver	Denise Speight	Season 2: 4 episodes	

== Theatre ==
Year	Title	Role	Notes
1976	Romeo and Juliet	Lady Capulet	NIDA Theatre, Sydney
1976	Miss Hook of Holland	Chorus	NIDA Theatre, Sydney
1977	A Spring Song		NIDA Theatre, Sydney
1977	The Hostage	Teresa	NIDA Theatre, Sydney, University of Newcastle, Orange Civic Theatre
1977	Once in a Lifetime		NIDA Theatre, Sydney
1981	The Murderer's Song		La Mama, Melbourne
1988	The First Born Trilogy: No Sugar	Secretary / Missionary	Fitzroy Town Hall, Melbourne with MTC & London tour
1989	Karamazov	Katarina	Crossroads Theatre, Sydney with Thalia Theatre Company
1998	Sylvia	Kate	Australian regional tour with MTC
2004	Memory of Water	Vi	Space 28, Melbourne with MTC
2004	Second Childhood		Australian regional tour with MTC & HotHouse Theatre
2005	Quilting the Armour	Ellen Kelly	Glenrowan, Old Melbourne Gaol
2009	Steel Magnolias	M’Lynn Eatenton	Seymour Centre, Sydney, QUT, Brisbane, Her Majesty's Theatre, Adelaide with Blackbird Productions
2010	Driving Miss Daisy	Daisy Werthan	HIT Productions
2013–2014	A Murder is Announced	Letitia Blacklock	Sydney Theatre, Comedy Theatre, Melbourne
2019	Harry Potter and the Cursed Child	Minerva McGonagall	Princess Theatre, Melbourne
2022–2023	A Christmas Carol	Ghost of Christmas Past	Comedy Theatre, Melbourne
2023	Way	Voice Over Artist	La Mama Courthouse, Melbourne
2023	Escaped Alone	Vi	Southbank Theatre, Melbourne with MTC
2023	What If If Only	Fs	Southbank Theatre, Melbourne with MTC
2024–2025	Harry Potter and the Cursed Child	Minerva McGonagall	West End
2026	Steel Magnolias	Clairee	Australian Tour
