= Alistair MacDougall =

Australian actor and photographer

- Born: Australia
- Occupations: Actor, model, photographer
- Years active: 1991–present
- Spouse: Valerie MacDougall

Alistair MacDougall is an Australian actor and photographer. He began his career taking the role of Ryan Lee in the Australian soap opera Home and Away. He then moved to the United States and appeared as Adam Cartwright Jr. in Bonanza: The Return and Ty Cooper in High Sierra Search and Rescue, which were both NBC productions. In later years, MacDougall became a professional photographer and started his own businesses.

== Career ==
MacDougall began his career working as a model and his significant roles were filming adverts for Levi Strauss & Co. He later stated that this work was only to support himself financially and that acting was his "love". His debut acting role came in 1991, with MacDougall portraying the role of Ryan Lee in the Australian soap opera, Home and Away. The character was portrayed as a villain and gained MacDougall notoriety in Australia. In a November 1992 interview featured in Inside Soap, MacDougall claimed he became fearful making public outings because of his character's villainy.

MacDougall then began his pursuing his acting career in the United States. He soon appeared in the 1993 episode of Cobra, titled "Something in the Air". He also took the role of Adam Cartwright Jr. in the made for television film Bonanza: The Return, which aired on NBC on 28 November 1993. His role in the show is an Australian cowboy. An American series, MacDougall kept his Australian accent and this was written into the character's backstory. His next role was a criminal who takes a woman hostage in Renegade.

In 1995, MacDougall took the regular role of Ty Cooper, in another NBC television series titled High Sierra Search and Rescue. Ty's role in the show was a deputy sheriff. NBC were forced to recast MacDougall's role of Adam in the Bonanza sequel Bonanza: Under Attack, with Jeff Phillips assuming the part. The network had not considered a schedule clash when they signed MacDougall to appear in High Sierra Search and Rescue. In 1996, MacDougall appeared as Eric Shay in the Pacific Blue episode titled "Over the Edge".

MacDougall eventually gave up trying to become successful in Hollywood and returned to Australia. MacDougall later graduated from the University of New South Wales with a design degree focusing on photography. He began working as a photographer based in Sydney, New South Wales. He runs two photography companies, Photo Organic dealing with wild life photography and another, called MacDougall Photography ran with his wife Valerie.

== Filmography ==
| Year | Title | Role | Notes |
|---|---|---|---|
| 1991-1992 | Home and Away | Ryan Lee | Recurring role |
| 1993 | Cobra | Jared Krill | Guest role |
| 1993 | Bonanza: The Return | Adam Cartwright Jr. | Film |
| 1994 | Renegade | Criminal | Guest role |
| 1995 | High Sierra Search and Rescue | Ty Cooper | Regular role |
| 1996 | Pacific Blue | Eric Shay | Guest role |
| 2000 | Dr. Jekyll and Mr. Hyde | Uncredited | Film |
