= Emily Symons =

Australian actress (born 1969)

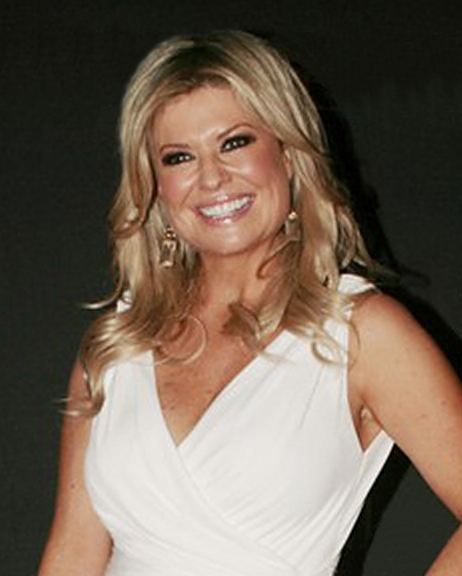
- Symons at the Myer Fashion Parade
- Born: 10 August 1969 (age 57); Sydney, New South Wales, Australia
- Occupation: Actress
- Years active: 1988–present
- Notable work: Richmond Hill; Home and Away; Emmerdale
- Spouses: Nick Lipscombe (m. 1992; div. 1994) Lorenzo Smith (m. 2003; div. 2005)
- Children: 1

Emily Symons (born 10 August 1969) is an Australian actress, active on both Australian and British television. She is known for playing Anne Costello in the short-lived soap opera Richmond Hill in 1988 and when that series ended in 1989, she played Marilyn Chambers in Home and Away. After almost ten years in that role, Symons moved to the UK and was immediately cast as Louise Appleton in the British soap Emmerdale. She also took part in the British show Dancing on Ice in 2007. She then returned to Australia in 2010 to reprise her role as Marilyn in Home and Away.

== Life and career ==
Symons's mother remarried when she was just four years old and Symons did not see her biological, English father again until ten years later. She left school before finishing her exams and launched herself into the acting world. For nearly a year, she worked in shops before getting a break in a post office training video.

Her first major television role was in Australian soap opera Richmond Hill. After Richmond Hill, Symons auditioned for another Australian drama, Home and Away, for which she won the role of Marilyn Chambers whom she played from 1989 until 1992, reprising the role in 1995 until 1999—with a brief appearance in 2001. She also co-hosted the Channel 7 music programme Video Smash Hits with Michael Horrocks from 1990 until 1991.

After starring in a string of pantomimes in England, Symons decided to move there. She played the role of barmaid Louise Appleton in the ITV1 soap opera Emmerdale from 2001 to 2008. She earned a nomination for Most Popular Newcomer at the 8th National Television Awards. She was also a contestant in the 2007 series of Dancing on Ice, but was voted out in the semi-final following a skate-off against Duncan James.

Symons returned to Australia in October 2008 to help take care of her mother who had cancer. In late 2009, Symons was approached about a return to Home and Away as Marilyn, which she accepted. She reprised the role in episode 5035 which aired on 19 March 2010. Symons celebrated 30 years with the show in 2019. In 2023, she received a nomination for the Logie Award for Most Popular Actress for her portrayal of Marilyn.

== Personal life ==
Symons was engaged to television technician Craig Simpson, but the relationship ended shortly before she left Australia for the UK in late 1990. While she was in the UK, Symons met graphic designer and drummer Nick Lipscombe while they both worked in the pantomime Follow The Star. Symons and Lipscombe married in November 1992. They separated in 1994 and Symons returned to Australia in June of that year. They divorced shortly after.

Symons was married to Lorenzo Smith, a son of Viscount Hambleden and descendant of English stationery tycoon W. H. Smith, for two years, from 2003 to 2005. Symons said in an interview that her need for children and the resultant cycles of IVF eventually "killed" the marriage.

She was engaged to footballer Matt Le Tissier. She dated her Emmerdale co-star Matt Healy, who played Matthew King. They broke up just before she took part in Dancing on Ice.

On 3 August 2015, Symons gave birth to her first child with her then-partner Paul Jackson.

== Filmography ==
Year	Title	Role	Notes
1988	Richmond Hill	Anne Costello	Main cast: 92 Episodes
1988	Computer Ghosts	Anya	Feature film
1989–1992, 1995–1999, 2001, 2010–present	Home and Away	Marilyn Chambers	Main cast: 3690+ Episodes
1990–1991	Video Smash Hits	Presenter	
1990	TV Celebrity Dance Party	Herself	With Farmhouse band Georgie Parker, Matt Day & Michael Horrocks perform "These Boots Are Made For Walkin'
1991	Celebrity Family Feud	Herself	Episode: "Home And Away v The Four Kinsmen"
1992	Celebrity Wheel of Fortune	Herself	Contestant with George Kapinaris & Derek Rucker
2001–2008	Emmerdale	Louise Appleton	Main cast: 405 Episodes
2007	Dancing on Ice	Contestant	

== Discography ==
=== Albums ===
List of albums, with Australian chart positions
Title	Album details	Peak chart positions
Title	Album details	AUS
Farmhouse (as part of Farmhouse)	Released: November 1991; Format: CD, Cassette; Label: RCA (VPCD 0845)	95

== Awards and nominations ==
Year	Award	Category	Work	Result	Ref.
2002	National Television Awards	Most Popular Newcomer	Emmerdale	Nominated	
2014	Equity Ensemble Awards	Most Outstanding Performance by an Ensemble in a Drama Series (shared with cast)	Home and Away (Season 26)	Nominated	
2023	Logie Awards	Most Popular Actress	Home and Away (Season 35)	Nominated	
