= Dieter Brummer =

Australian actor (1976–2021)

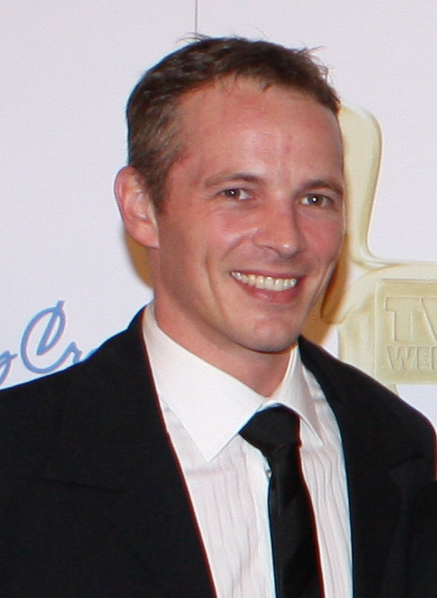
- Brummer at the Logie Awards of 2011
- Born: Dieter Kirk Brummer; 5 May 1976; Sydney, New South Wales, Australia
- Died: 24 July 2021 (aged 45); Glenhaven, New South Wales, Australia
- Occupation: Actor
- Years active: 1991–2014
- Known for: Home and Away as Shane Parrish (1992–96); Neighbours as Troy Miller (2011–12); Underbelly: The Golden Mile (2009–10)

Dieter Kirk Brummer (5 May 1976 – 24 July 2021) was an Australian actor. He was best known for his roles in television soap operas, including playing Shane Parrish in Home and Away from 1992 to 1996 and Troy Miller in Neighbours from 2011 to 2012. He also starred in crime drama Underbelly: The Golden Mile, after having a smaller role in the previous series.

Brummer and Home and Away co-star Melissa George, who portrayed his partner and later screen wife Angel Parrish, were promoted as a soap super couple in the early 1990s.

== Biography ==
Brummer was born in Sydney, New South Wales, and was of German descent. He began his career starring as Shane Parrish in the television soap opera Home and Away. Brummer was nominated for the Gold Logie and Silver Logie Awards for "Most Popular Actor" for the role of Shane in 1994, but failed to win. He won the "Most Popular Actor" Silver Logie Award in 1995 and 1996.

In 1993, 1994, and 1995 the role saw Brummer voted as "The Prince of Soap" by Dolly magazine's readers. He was written out by way of his character dying from blood poisoning.

Brummer appeared in the hospital drama Medivac, the pay-TV series Shark Bay and had a guest role in The Man from Snowy River in 1996. He appeared in the 1999 film Tom's Funeral and in the 2001 film, The Finder. He had a recurring role in the short-lived FOX8 soap opera Crash Palace as Dave Collins in 2001 until 2002.

In 2005, he took part in the reality television series Celebrity Circus. In 2007, his mother told Sydney-based radio station 2Day FM that he was working as a window-cleaner between acting roles. The station tried to get an interview with him for a "where are they now?" segment, but was unsuccessful.

In 2009, Brummer joined the cast of Underbelly, during the second series in Underbelly: A Tale of Two Cities in the minor role of Trevor Haken, a corrupt member of the New South Wales Police Force. In the third series, Underbelly: The Golden Mile, this role was increased to one of the principal cast.

In 2011, Brummer joined the cast of Neighbours for seven weeks as Troy Miller. In March 2012, it was announced that Brummer had reprised his role as Troy for another guest stint. In 2014, he joined the cast of Winners & Losers for 5 episodes as Jason Ross.

== Death ==
On 24 July 2021, Brummer was found dead at his home in Glenhaven, Sydney at the age of 45. New South Wales Police Force officers discovered him after responding to a 'concern for welfare' report.

== Filmography ==
Year	Title	Role	Notes
1991	Home and Away	Alex	Guest role
1992–1996	Home and Away	Shane Parrish	Main cast
1994	Full Frontal	Guest Performer	
1994	Sky Trackers	Dieter Brummer (uncredited)	Episode: "Do or Die"
1996	Medivac	Dr. Sean Michaels	
1996	Snowy River: The McGregor Saga	Nathan	Episode: "A Son of a Son: Part 2"
1996	Shark Bay	Brad Delaney	
1999	Tom's Funeral		Feature film
2001	The Finder	Rick Davidson	Feature film
2001	Crash Palace	Dave Colins	Recurring role
2009	A Model Daughter: The Killing of Caroline Byrne	Sgt. Mark Powderly	Television film
2009	Underbelly: A Tale of Two Cities	Trevor Haken	Guest cast
2010	Underbelly: The Golden Mile	Trevor Haken	Main cast
2011	Rescue: Special Ops	Nathan Pearl	Episode: "Demon Days"
2011	Cupid	Apollo	Short
2011–2012	Neighbours	Troy Miller	Recurring role
2013–2014	Winners & Losers	Jason Ross	Recurring role

1995 Flipper

== Guest appearances ==
Year	Title	Role	Notes
1996	Fully Booked	As himself	
2005	Celebrity Circus	Self	
2010	20 to One	As himself	Episode: "Greatest Sports Movies of all Time"
	Review with Myles Barlow	Self	Episodes: "Wanderlust, Addiction, Cult" and "Imitation, Hatred, Justice"
2010	Inside Film Awards	Self	
2018	Endless Summer: 30 Years of Home and Away	Shane Parrish	Documentary
2012	The Jonathan Ross Show	Self	

== Awards and nominations ==
Year	Association	Category	Work	Result
1993	Logie Awards	Most Popular New Talent	Home and Away	Nominated
1994	Logie Awards	Most Popular Personality on Australian Television	Home and Away	Nominated
1994	Logie Awards	Most Popular Actor	Home and Away	Nominated
1995	Logie Awards	Most Popular Actor	Home and Away	Won
1996	Logie Awards	Most Popular Actor	Home and Away	Won
1996	Logie Awards	Most Popular Personality on Australian Television	Home and Away	Nominated

For his portrayal of Shane Parrish on Home and Away, Brummer won two Logie Awards for Most Popular Actor in 1995 and 1996. He received nominations for Most Popular New Talent in 1993, and the Gold Logie Award for Most Popular Personality on Australian Television in 1994 and 1996.
