= Finlay Roberts =

- Home and Away character
- Portrayed by: Tina Thomsen; Jessie Bullions (flashback)
- Duration: 1991–1994, 1996–1997
- First appearance: 18 September 1991
- Last appearance: 4 March 1997
- Introduced by: Des Monaghan (1991); John Holmes (1996, 1997)
In-universe information
- Occupation: Student at Summer Bay High (1991–93); Waitress; Restaurant owner
- Father: Murdoch Roberts
- Mother: Irene Roberts
- Brothers: Nathan Roberts; Damian Roberts
- Half-brothers: Mick Jennings
- Husband: Barry Michaels
- Sons: Paul Roberts; Mark Roberts
- Aunts: Wendy McFarlane
- First cousins: Nelson McFarlane

Finlay "Fin" Roberts is a fictional character in the Australian soap opera Home and Away, portrayed by Tina Thomsen. She made her first appearance during the episode airing on 18 September 1991 and departed on 20 May 1994. Thomsen made return guest appearances in 1996 and 1997. Jessie Bullions portrayed a young Finlay in a flashback in 1997.

== Casting ==
Thomsen was still a teenager when she secured the role and she relocated her family from Brisbane to Sydney to accommodate filming. Thomsen told Jenna Price from The Sydney Morning Herald: "It's me who did the pushing ... my parents just supported me."

In February 1994, Di Stanley of TV Week confirmed Thomsen would be departing the serial and filming her final scenes on 25 March. Thomsen had no regrets about her decision to leave, stating "I've wanted to leave for a while. Probably for the past nine months I've been getting itchy feet and wanting to leave. I've been here three years. It's a really long time and I didn't really feel my character was going anywhere anyway." Thomsen pointed out that Fin had not had a storyline in a long time, which is what sparked her decision to leave the show and pursue something else. She met with producer Russell Webb, who agreed that her character "had had her time." Thomsen was grateful for the exposure she had received from the show, for the friends she had made, and her partner at the time, Andrew Hill, who played Haydn Ross. Her final scenes aired on 20 May 1994.

In 2012, Lynne McGranger who plays the character's on-screen mother Irene Roberts said that she doubted Finlay would ever return to the series because Thomsen had quit acting and became a mother.

== Character development ==
Finlay is involved in a relationship with Blake Dean (Les Hill). The two characters share an "unexpected passionate kiss". Blake continues to battle his grief over losing his girlfriend Meg Bowman (Cathy Godbold), who died from leukaemia. Di Stanley from TV Week revealed that Finlay believes she has found the love she had long sought "after a turbulent and affection-starved childhood." Finlay cannot wait to tell others she and Blake are in a relationship. This forces Blake to admit he still loves Meg. A reporter from Inside Soap said that Finlay has "really fallen for" Blake and is "hurt and embarrassed" to be rebuffed by him. In the following months Blake changes his mind, but Finlay puts up a "fight" and tries to resist him. The writer added that Blake "broke her heart and made her feel a fool, and she isn't ever going to let him put her in that position again".

Finlay later turns down Blake's offer of a date, but agrees to go scuba diving with him as friends. However, Finlay fails to resurface after the dive because her oxygen supply is cut short and Blake fears that she has drowned. The scenes were filmed at UnderWater World in Mooloolaba, Queensland. The storyline served as the serial's end-of-year "cliff-hanger" and viewers had to wait until the series returned to find out whether or not Finlay survives. A writer from The Sun-Herald said that she would survive and be "possibly suffering from brain damage", while Inside Soap's reporter revealed that the character's "life hangs in the balance". This leads to "tense scenes" with Finlay's mother Irene and Blake. He then declares his love for Finlay, but other characters think that he is still not over his ex-girlfriend Meg.

In one storyline Finlay taking "uppers and downers" to help her studying for her high school certificate. Writers began Fin's descent into drugs via her struggles with exam revision. She decides to take pills to aid her revision. The pills keep her awake at night but leave her exhausted in the day. Fin's drug use soon leaves her irritable and agitated. When Pippa and Michael ask Fin to move bedrooms, she has an angry outburst. Michael is disgusted with her behaviour and Fin realises that she has a drug problem. Thomsen told a TVTimes reporter that "she took the pills with the best intentions." As Fin had to repeat a school year "she was determined to do well in her exams this year. But instead of making it easier to study, the pills just make her a bit manic. She starts yelling and throwing tantrums." Fin decides that she needs to overcome her new addiction. She tries to get hold of sleeping pills to counteract them but to no avail. Her behaviour then makes Irene suspicious of her. Thomsen concluded that Fin's experiences with drugs proved that they are "bad news".

Thomsen told Robert Kilroy-Silk on his show Kilroy Down Under that Finlay had a positive influence on young people at times. She explained to Kilroy-Silk that she "really enjoyed" the drug storyline and found it "worthwhile". She had "a lot of" younger girls and mothers writing to her to thank you to her for portraying the issue. When Thomsen was at high school, she knew other that were going through the same situation during studying as her character did. She added that it was a topic that "a lot of girls needed to know the effects of and after they watched it they sort of became aware of what was going to happen to them and that it was affecting them in the wrong way." She concluded that topics that achieve what Finlay's storyline did are "really worthwhile".

== Storylines ==
Finlay first appears as a runaway who unsuccessfully attempts to get a free meal from the Diner and sleeps at the boat shed. She spends the night on one of the boats but wakes up to find it has been taken out by Nick Parrish (Bruce Roberts) and Lucinda Croft (Dee Smart). When they discover her, Lou gives her money to stay at the caravan park. She befriends Sophie Simpson (Rebekah Elmaloglou) and tells her of her plan to support herself through school. Sophie helps persuade Ailsa Stewart (Judy Nunn and Bobby Simpson (Nicolle Dickson) to give her a job at the Diner. Finlay applies to Summer Bay High but the new principal Lois Crawford (Tina Bursill) is trying to turn the school into a more elite establishment and doesn't want Finlay attending. Donald Fisher (Norman Coburn), who has been demoted in favour of Lois, champions her cause. When Fin accidentally hits herself with a cupboard door, she uses the bruise to claim Lois hit her. The lie is found out but Lois is removed from the school anyway and Donald is reinstated as principal. Finlay is set a test, which she passes at the second attempt and she is enrolled in Year 11. As part of a deal she had earlier made with them, Finlay moves in with Sophie's foster parents Michael (Dennis Coard) and Pippa Ross (Debra Lawrance. Donald checks her records and learns that her mother Irene (Jacqui Phillips) has reported her missing, meaning he is obliged to tell the police where she is. Irene is revealed to be a violent alcoholic but Finlay almost returns to her when Irene attempts to use her younger brother Damian (Matt Doran) as leverage. However, Damian tells Finlay to keep her new life and Finlay tells him he should make the break from Irene as well.

Fin discovers Sophie is pregnant by her late boyfriend David Croft (Guy Pearce). When Sophie starts dating Simon Fitzgerald (Richard Norton), Fin betrays her confidence and tells him about the pregnancy. Finlay makes friends with Meg Bowman and is upset by her death from leukaemia. She dates Randy Evans (Murray Bartlett), who Michael disapproves of. When she asks to go away with him and his friends for the weekend, Michael refuses and although he agrees to let her spend the day with them, he tells her if she stays overnight she will not be welcome in the house. Fin's evening is a disaster when Randy gets drunk and allows one of his friends to make advances on her. She returns to Summer Bay but doesn't feel able to go back to the Rosses so she stays with Bobby and her boyfriend Greg Marshall (Ross Newton) until Bobby and Randy convince her to return home, where Michael and Pippa offer to officially foster Finlay. She is initially keen but feels guilty when she gets a letter from Damian, who runs away from home. Fin and Sophie hide him until he is discovered but he is allowed to stay with the Rosses when Irene is revealed to have been beating him. Irene tries to take Damian by force and falls down some stairs during a confrontation. She threatens to charge Fin and Damian with assault if they do not come home but ultimately accepts defeat and both Finlay and Damian are fostered by the Rosses.

Finlay worries when Damian becomes friends with Shane Parrish (Dieter Brummer) who leads him astray. She initially believes Damian is behind a robbery at the surf club kiosk but when she learns Shane is responsible and is blackmailing Damian she defends him to Adam Cameron (Mat Stevenson). She later shares a kiss with her friend Blake Dean and assumes they are now a couple. Blake isn't keen but can't bring himself to tell her, so he and Adam arrange for Finlay to see him kissing another girl, Andrea. When Fin learns it was a set-up, she gets her own back by sabotaging Blake's alarm clock so he is late for an exam. She later has a relationship with classmate Robert Davis (Steven Trinder) and tries to set Sophie, now a new mother, up with his friend Gary (Grant Wilson) but Sophie decides she isn't ready for a relationship. Fin has a crisis when Sophie and Ryan Lee (Alistair McDougall) accidentally throw her study notes away. She tries to use Blake's instead but is unable to make sense of them. Robert gets some stolen exam papers so they can cheat but Fin has an attack of conscience and confesses to Nick, meaning she has to repeat the year.

Fin and Blake begin scuba diving lessons together and become close again. Fin's reluctance to commit to a relationship with Blake fades after an accident where she is trapped underwater and nearly drowns. They share a kiss and become a couple. Irene (now played by Lynne McGranger) returns to town, having sobered up, but Fin and Damian are reluctant to trust her, trying to hide all the alcohol in the house and refusing to return to live with her. Blake's sister Karen (Belinda Jarrett) is paroled from juvenile detention and begins causing problems. After she starts a fight in a night club that results in Blake being punched, Blake follows Karen to the city to sort her out and later sends a letter to Fin saying he is not coming back, leaving her heartbroken. Irene moves to town permanently and, although Fin declines to live with her, they begin to rebuild a relationship, with Irene helping Fin when she begins taking medication to help her study. Fin is less pleased when her older brother Nathan (David Dixon) appears after being released from jail and is proved right when Nathan goes back to his old ways and is jailed for robbery. Michael's son Haydn (Andrew Hill) returns to town and Fin dates him until it is revealed he has a gambling addiction and he temporarily flees town after conning money out of Michael and Pippa. When he returns and tries to mend his ways, Roxanne Miller (Lisa Lackey) convinces Finlay to give Haydn another chance. Haydn convinces Fin to help him with a plan to win enough money to pay Michael and Pippa back but his horse loses. Haydn then leaves town again, leaving a goodbye letter. Not long after, Fin leaves Summer Bay to attend college.

Two years later, Fin returns to Summer Bay. She explains that she has been told she cannot have children as she miscarried six months earlier. She also admits that Barry, (David E Woodley) her boyfriend, proposed to her. She tells Irene that they would like her to be a surrogate and she accepts. They leave for the United States to start the procedure. A few months later Finlay herself falls pregnant, but assures Irene she will bring up both babies. She returns to town to be with Irene when she gives birth, but her son Paul is abducted only a few hours later. A distraught Irene tells Fin that Paul is nothing to do with her and orders her to go.

Later, Fin and Irene reconcile off screen when Irene visits her after the birth of her other son Mark. Soon after, Irene is reunited with Paul and sends him to live with Fin.
