= Tug O'Neale =

- Home and Away character
- Portrayed by: Tristan Bancks
- Duration: 1992–1994
- First appearance: 20 May 1992
- Last appearance: 7 September 1994
- Introduced by: Des Monaghan
In-universe information
- Occupation: Student (1992–94); Shop Assistant (1994)
- Father: Roy O'Neale
- Wife: Sarah Thompson
- Aunts: Mavis Brown

Peter "Tug" O'Neale is a fictional character from the Australian Channel Seven soap opera Home and Away, played by Tristan Bancks. The actor was selected from 200 people who had auditioned for the role and was contracted to appear for one month. Bancks soon joined the regular cast and Tug became a prominent character. Tug fills the role of the villain and is characterised by his "hardened, streetwise tough kid" image. The serial created a backstory consisting of a mother who abandoned him and an alcoholic father. Bancks has credited Tug's troubled childhood as the reason viewers were able to relate to him.

Tug's storylines include bullying Damian Roberts (Matt Doran), behavioural issues, a feud with Shane Parrish (Dieter Brummer), relationships with Sarah Thompson (Laura Vasquez) and his school teacher Beth Armstrong (Toni Pearen). The character has also been used to portray a suicide attempt. After a series of misdemeanours Tug instigates a car crash to end his life. Bancks researched the issue to help him play the scenes and subsequently felt depressed. In 1994, Bancks left Home and Away to pursue other projects. He believed that Tug no longer had material to play because he had used up "so many complicated storylines". Tug left the series in September that year.

The character has been positively received by critics and viewers alike. Josephine Monroe writing for the TVTimes opined that Tug was "generally humiliated" throughout his tenure. Lisa Anthony from BIG! stated that Tug changed from "horrible" to "sloppy" through his romance with Sarah. Melissa Field said that Tug is always grumpy. Woman's Own reporter Mary Fletcher named him one of the show's "most interesting residents".

== Casting ==
Bancks joined the cast of Home and Away in 1992 and he had previously undertaken a drama class which Bancks felt had well prepared him for the role. He was selected from 200 actors that auditioned for the role. Bancks felt that the "biggest thrill" of his career was when his agent informed him that he had secured the role. Bancks missed "muck-up day" at school because he was learning his scripts for his first episode and he began filming in March immediately after leaving school. Tug was originally only meant to be a guest character. Bancks signed a one-month contract with the serial when he was sixteen and was later promoted to the regular cast.

== Character development ==
=== Characterisation ===
"It's been a long hard road for Tug O'Neale in Summer Bay. He was a wild 15 year-old when he was first seen, abandoned by his mother who left him with a drunken, lawless father. He swiftly set about terrorising the neighbourhood, he was the playground bully, thumping anyone who got in his way, starved of love and finding it impossible to form relationships. It seemed he was destined for a tortured life following in his father Roy's footsteps and inevitably winding up in jail."

— Angie Taylor from the Soap describing Tug's life. (1994)

Tug is characterised as a "bad boy" teenager. Tempany Deckert who plays Selina Roberts described Tug as a "rough renegade" who had lost his way but "finally got back on the straight and narrow with the help of various foster parents". A writer from the show's official website described Tug as a "hardened, streetwise tough kid, who lived up to his nickname".

Bancks told Monroe of TVTimes that he thought Tug "had a much harder time" in life because the writers decided upon a "such a silly name". Lisa Anthony from BIG! magazine reported that Tug would go "b-for-bonkers" at his headteacher Donald Fisher (Norman Coburn), burn his tie and walk out of the school. Bancks told Anthony that he sympathised with Tug because "everyone has problems at school" and added that he did not go to "the lengths" that Tug did. Bacnks explained to Ally Oliver from Inside Soap that Tug's persona changed through the writing. He "liked" the character when he first began portraying Tug's journey. "He was pretty tortured, but the writers softened him up a lot and it's difficult to play against the script your given."

While interviewed by Soap's Angie Taylor, the actor described Tug as being a character who "has to be tough and able to stand up for himself". But at the same time Tug remains likeable and sometimes he can be "very unlikeable". Bancks opined that there is always a need for a bad guy in certain parts of storylines. The fact that Tug's personality had mellowed was viewed as a positive change of character by Bancks. He explained to Taylor that it helped him play Tug and stated "I do like him and I like playing him because he's so far removed from myself. I can relate to the character - otherwise I wouldn't be able to play him - but he's very different to me."

Towards the end of Tug's tenure, Bancks had transformed a "troubled" character into a popular one that appealed to teenagers. Bancks opined that Tug's backstory was responsible for developing the connection with viewers; more so with those who had a difficult upbringing empathised with Tug. His mother conducted an affair and abandoned him with an alcoholic father who constantly disappointed him. Bancks concluded that "so many things have gone wrong for Tug that he's lost his self-confidence".

=== Feud with Shane Parrish ===
The serial developed a rivalry between Tug and Shane Parrish (Dieter Brummer), although, off-screen the pair became best friends. Their storyline began in 1992 when Tug frames Shane for a burglary and he vows to get revenge. Their feud was still prominent in 1993 when Tug discovers that Shane is planning to kiss his love interest Sarah Thompson (Laura Vasquez). In the book Home and Away – Official Collector’s Edition, Andrea Black wrote that Tug is left "absolutely furious" by Shane's actions. But noted that it was all a ploy on Shane's behalf and Sarah did, in fact, love him. In 2008, Bancks said that some of his favourite scenes featured Brummer and their character's on-screen rivalry crossed over into real life. But Bancks said that he and Brummer approached their own in "more of a joking way". Inside Soap's Oliver wrote that Tug and Shane were always involved in battles but Bancks and Brummer were a "formidable pair" on the "teen scene" appearing on magazine covers alongside one another as a result of the storyline.

=== Relationship with Sarah Thompson ===
Tug had long been portrayed as having an interest in Sarah. Bancks told a reporter from Look-in that Tug "took a liking to her the moment he saw her, and he was really surprised that she liked him too. It's not often someone breaks through Tug's tough exterior like Sarah has." Vasquez added that Sarah immediately thought that Tug was "cute" and "she liked the way he treated her too. He was a known troublemaker but she saw the softer side of him." As Tug and Sarah's relationship progressed they share a kiss. The scenes were Vasquez's first to involve kissing and she felt "really nervous" but it turned out to be "really easy". The on-screen duo would soon be engaged in many "snogging scenes", but their first kiss was filmed during the Australian school holidays. Vasquez told BIG!'s Lisa Anthony that filming the embrace proved "quite nerve-racking" due to an entire "circle of school kids" surrounding them. Already feeling nervous, an audience made the actors feel worse during the shoot. It was a "nightmare situation" for Bancks who had found it strange to kiss in front of "seven hundred thousand people". Tug fans were already hassling Bancks having sensed a kiss with Sarah was imminent.

Tug and Sarah get engaged but after an argument, Sarah hands Tug the engagement ring back. Vasquez felt that it happened because Tug did not have a good upbringing and as a result he is "unsure of himself". She still hoped for a future for the two characters because Tug needs attention and Sarah is always there to give him understanding. She concluded that while they are two different people, they get on well with each other. Sarah begins to date Nathan Roberts (David Dixon). Dixon told Richard Galpin from BIG! magazine that Tug initially "hates" and then "loves" Nathan. But through Sarah he ends up hating him once again. In one scene Tug and Nathan get into a fight over Sarah. Dixon said "we had one scene where I had to call Tug a jerk and then he'd give me a gentle push back. When we came to do it for real, instead of a gentle tap, he gave me a huge shove and I was like, 'Hey that really hurt mate'". Dixon suspected that a relationship between the two made Bancks push him harder.

Following his break-up with Sarah, Tug loses his job and she tells him that their relationship is over for good. The series of events impact negatively on Tug and he becomes "despairing and suicidal". He takes a car and drives it into a telegraph pole and is hospitalised. Bancks told Fletcher that he could understand how Tug felt and his predicament was made worse without any parents to offer guidance. Bancks carried out research such as watching a programme based on teenage suicide. The experience made Bancks feel depressed the more he studied the issue.

Tug and Sarah romance became popular and Fletcher from Woman's Own said that had become one of the show's "hottest couples". Bancks told Fletcher that "spending eight hours a day as [the] teenage sweethearts" Tug and Sarah had created a mutual attraction between himself and Vaquez. The pair were pictured as a couple in magazines and wrote stories about them. This annoyed producers because they felt that it was spoiling the image Home and Away had created and the actors quickly denied a relationship.

=== Relationship with Beth Armstrong ===
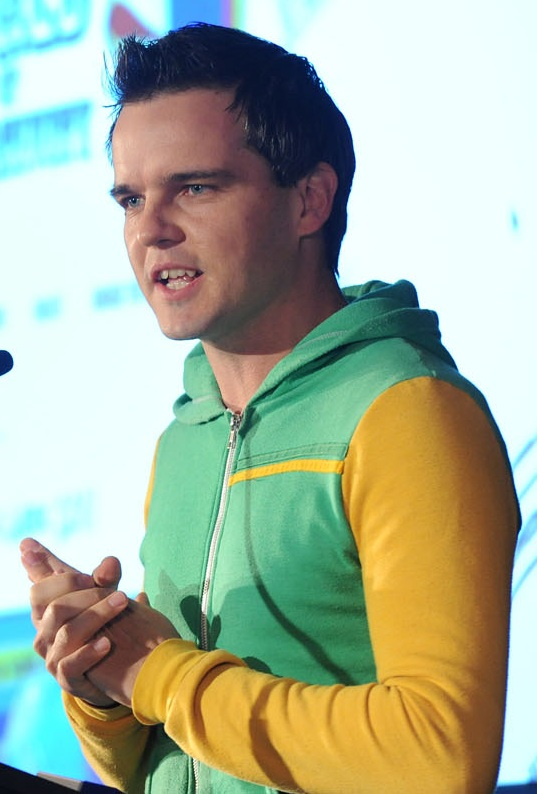
Tristan Bancks (pictured) filmed his final scenes as Tug in 1994.

In 1994 Toni Pearen was cast as new teacher Beth Armstrong. Photographers from BIG! magazine visited Pearen to take promotional shots. They revealed that she is Tug's teacher and that the two characters would "snog" on-screen. A writer from Inside Soap reported that romance was "blossoming for luckless Tug" and Beth. However, another teacher, Luke warns his "smitten" colleague that pursuing a relationship with Tug will ruin her career. When Tug and Beth share a "romantic dinner" together and she realises that "sparks are indeed flying" between them. She is left with the decision of choosing Tug or her career. A reporter from Inside Soap noted that this was a "scandal" storyline and Tug and Beth's romance rocked Summer Bay.

Tug and Beth begin spending time together when she is assigned to give him private lessons. Beth attempts to deny her feelings but soon succumbs to temptation. Pearen explained to Ally Oliver from Inside Soap that the relationship develops because Beth is "really lonely, she's got a new job in a brand new town and she doesn't have any friends". They attempt to keep their romance a secret, especially from their headmaster Donald, though their relationship is later exposed. Pearen said that other characters ask Beth to control her "desire" for Tug. But as she noted it was "much too late" for that to happen.

=== Departure ===
"Tug had been given so many complicated storylines I don't think there was much more for him to do, but it's fine by me."

— Bancks' reasoning for Tug's departure. (1994)

Tug was written out of the series in 1994. A writer from TV Week first reported that Tug had been axed alongside the characters of Sarah, Luke Cunningham (John Adam) and Roxanne Miller (Lisa Lackey). They added that producers did not inform them and their report was the first they would know of their departures. Lackey later denied the claims, but Bancks confirmed he was leaving. Bancks told Fiona Parker and David Hancock from the Daily Mirror that he had a great two and half years working on Home and Away, but was content in pursuing other projects.

Bancks told Soap's Taylor that Tug would depart the show in September 1994 and admitted he was not sure how he would leave. But he revealed that Tug would not be killed off. Taylor stated that this was due to the other characters leaving around the same time. She added that "producers are anxious not to go over the top with the storylines and do anything overly dramatic". When his exit storyline played out on-screen he was depicted leaving Summer Bay on a tractor. The actor later told Josephine Monroe from TVTimes that he hoped to never return to the show.

== Storylines ==
Tug transfers to Summer Bay High and begins bullying Damian Roberts (Matt Doran). Damian's friends Blake Dean (Les Hill) and Simon Fitzgerald (Richard Norton) warn Tug and physically threaten him. Tug continues his harassment campaign against Damian which leads to a fight which Damian wins after Blake and Simon secretly force Tug to deliberately lose. Tug challenges Damian to a rematch, which he refuses and when Tug tries to prevent him from leaving, Damian breaks his nose. Tug reappears when his father Roy's (Mervyn Drake) bear traps injure Damian's friend Shane. Roy is later arrested and jailed for stealing from Michael Ross' (Dennis Coard) boatshed. Tug, angry at Shane, frames him for robbery by burgling the house where Shane is doing community service for a prior joyriding offence. Shane is then arrested and sent to Juvenile detention. Bobby Marshall (Nicolle Dickson) realises the truth and urges Tug to confess. Shane is released and Tug is given 40 hours community service.

Sarah Thompson arrives in Summer Bay and Tug becomes attracted to her. However, Tug ruins his chances when he plasters old swimsuit photos of his teacher Roxanne around school. Tug later apologises and Sarah sees another side of him and they begin dating. The relationship hits a snag when Tug's aunt Mavis (Mary Haire) decides to move away and wants him to come with her. Tug tries to find a local family to stay with in order for him to continue his schooling but nobody is willing. Sarah then moves in with Alf (Ray Meagher) and Ailsa Stewart (Judy Nunn) while Tug takes her old room at Bobby's place. Bobby's husband Greg Marshall (Ross Newton) is not keen on him staying but changes his mind when Tug saves Sarah's life after she suffers an asthma attack in the bush.

When Sarah is cast in the lead role of the school musical, Tug is concerned that she will be starring opposite Shane. After unsuccessfully auditioning himself, he takes a job as a prompt. Tug's jealousy causes a temporary split with Sarah and he begins spending time with Michelle Carter (Zoe Emmanuel). Sarah forgives him and Tug apologises to Shane, only for Shane to tease him about kissing Sarah. On the night of the performance, Shane overdoes the kiss and Tug storms the stage and punches him, ruining the play. Sarah dumps Tug, but they later agree to be friends.

Bobby is killed in a boating accident and Greg leaves for Queensland, leaving Tug worried that he will be homeless but Luke and Roxy move into the Beach House. Damian's brother Nathan is released from prison and begins dating Sarah, much to his disapproval. Tug then drops out of school and applies to be the janitor but is beaten to the position by Nathan. Things look up when Roy (now played by Russell Kiefel) is released from prison and asks him to move back to the farm. When a water source is found on their land, the O'Neales celebrate. Things turn sour when a drunken Roy gropes Sarah during the celebrations, forcing Tug to punch him. Roy then leaves ashamed the next day. Tug considers leaving too, until, Shane persuades him to stay. In spite of this, Tug's behaviour worsens and he steals Roxy's car and crashes it. He is handed a three-month sentence which is later overturned.

Tug returns to school and is tutored privately by Beth. He soon develops feelings for her but Beth rebuffs him. Tug realises nothing can happen while Beth is his tutor and assumes they will get together after he leaves school. When Beth accepts a date with Nick he feels she is cheating on him. Beth then decides to leave town and she and Tug share an emotional goodbye. Sarah's father, Matthew (Jeff Truman) arrives to stay at The Stewarts. He and Tug strike up a close bond which leads Matthew to see Tug and Sarah as a perfect match. Sarah persuades Tug to play up in front of Matthew to try and dissuade him, which annoys Matthew when he discovers. However, Matthew still offers Tug a job helping to run his farm. Tug accepts and leaves the Bay. In 2002, Alf mentions that Tug and Sarah have since married and they are expecting their second child.

== Reception ==
Melissa Field from BIG! said that Tug was always "so grumpy" because he was named after a "small water craft". Kilmeny Adie from the Illawarra Mercury said that Bancks "made a name for himself in 1992" being Home and Away's "heart-throb". A writer from Inside Soap said that the storyline in which Tug brings a stray cow home and teaches Irene to milk it had "hilarious results". While another columnist from the publication said that "Tug does his best to look tough and streetwise in front of his girlfriend, [but] he fails to save face when he finally meets his wayward father." They added that the combination of finding his father and Shane goading him over the time he spent with Sarah during rehearsals for their school musical; result in Tug hitting an "all time low". The two episodes featuring the school musical where Tug's feud with Shane reaches a climax were nominated for "Best Episode in a Television Drama Serial" at the Australian Film Institute awards in 1993. Kate Langbroek writing for The Age branded the Tug as one of the show's "resident dope" characters. Monroe from TVTimes said that "Tug O'Neale's had a hard time of it in Home and Away. He's tried suicide, lost the family farm and been generally humiliated in Summer Bay." In Fletcher's article in Woman's Own she opined that Bancks "turned the troubled Tug into one of Summer Bay's most interesting residents, with a huge following of young fans." BIG!'s Anthony opined that "horrible old Tug" turned "soppy" once he became involved with Sarah. She added that no would have believed Tug would stop "terrorising Shane, beating up people, and generally being obnoxious".
