= Sarah Thompson (Home and Away) =

Fictional character from the soap opera Home and Away

- Home and Away character
- Portrayed by: Laura Vasquez
- Duration: 1993–1995, 2005
- First appearance: 26 January 1993
- Last appearance: 8 July 2005
- Introduced by: Andrew Howie (1993); John Holmes (1995); Julie McGuaran (2005)
In-universe information
- Other names: Sarah O'Neale
- Occupation: Student at Summer Bay High (1993–94)
- Father: Matthew Thompson
- Mother: Janet Thompson
- Husband: Tug O'Neale

Sarah O'Neale (also Thompson) is a fictional character from the Australian Channel Seven soap opera Home and Away, played by Laura Vasquez. The character debuted on-screen during the episode airing on 26 January 1993. Vasquez's screen-test for the role was one of her career highlights. Sarah is characterised as a "real good goody" female who is "very intelligent" and she arrives to study in Summer Bay. Sarah's main romance storyline is with Tug O'Neale (Tristan Bancks). Subsequently Vasquez and Bancks became fixtures in the media, as interest increased about the nature of the actor's off-screen relationship. Mary Fletcher from Woman's Own wrote that Home and Away producers were infuriated by the reports because they felt it discredited the show's image. However, the actors later denied any romance occurring off-screen.

During her tenure, Sarah also dates Nathan Roberts (David Dixon) and he attempts to get Sarah to lose her virginity to him. Vasquez has stated that her favourite storyline for Sarah was an asthma attack because it portrayed the seriousness of the condition. Vasquez later left the series and Sarah departed during October 1994, but the actress returned for guest appearances in 1995 and 2005. Lisa Anthony from BIG! said that Sarah was a "quiet" character and Justine Cullen writing for Inside Soap said that she was unlucky in love. Two episodes of the serial centric to Sarah's storyline were also nominated for an Australian Film Institute award.

== Casting ==
Vasquez has said that her "biggest breakthrough" career wise was her final screen test for the role of Sarah. Actress Ada Nicodemou also auditioned for the role in 1992. She was later cast as Leah Patterson.

In 1994, Vasquez left Home and Away to pursue a career in music. But a writer from TV Week claimed that Vasquez discovered that Sarah was being written out after they published the story in their magazine.

== Character development ==
=== Characterisation ===
A writer from Home and Away: The Official Magazine said that Sarah is a "real good goody and very intelligent too". They added that when Sarah arrives to study at Summer Bay High but her father Matthew (Jeff Truman) does not want her to stay. Sarah ultimately ends up staying and living with Ailsa Stewart (Judy Nunn).

Sarah has asthma and in one scene she suffers a serious asthma attack. Vasquez told Look-in's writer that it was her favourite scene from Sarah's entire duration. It was a "great" opportunity for her as an actress because she highlighted that having an asthma attack "can be really frightening".

In 1994, Lisa Anthony from BIG! reported that Angel Brooks (Melissa George) would give Sarah a make-over transforming her from "square to sex goddess". Sarah's new attire included little shorts, Vasquez told Anthony that her character's style was still "daggy" because she is a "country girl" and "just so conservative compared to Angel".

=== Relationship with Tug O'Neale ===
Sarah's first relationship storyline is with Tug O'Neale (Tristan Bancks). Bancks told a writer from Look-in that Sarah is "sweet and innocent" type of character. While Vasquez noted that from the beginning Sarah thought Tug was "pretty cute" and she likes the way he treats her. Tug is characterised as the serial's "troublemaker" but Sarah sees "the softer side of him". In the Home and Away – Official Collector’s Edition a writer said that Tug was "absolutely furious" when he learned that his "archenemy" Shane Parrish (Dieter Brummer), planned to kiss Sarah. But it was later revealed that Sarah did love Tug and "that kiss was only a ploy to make Tug jealous".

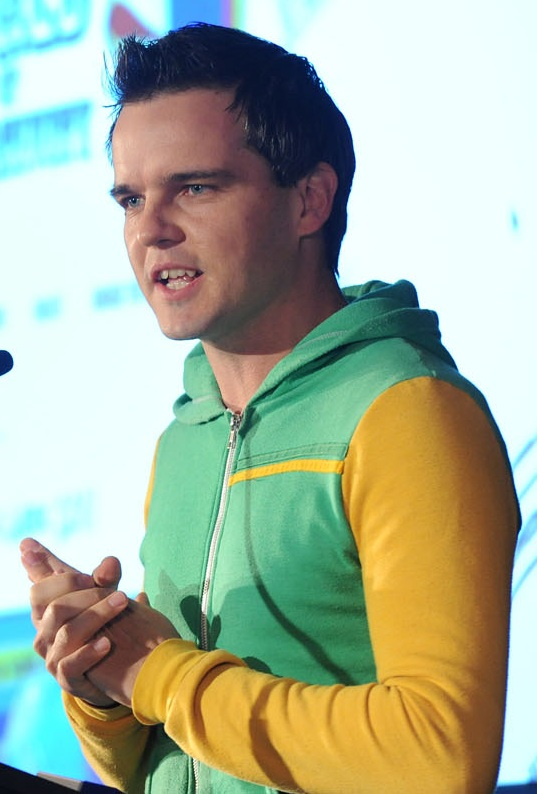
Tristan Bancks (pictured) played Sarah's love interest Tug O'Neale.

Vasquez told Lisa Anthony from BIG! that she and Bancks "hit it off straight away". While Vasquez and Bancks had formed a friendship due to their characters' romance, journalists became convinced that the actors were in a relationship. Bancks told Ally Oliver from Inside Soap that the media often "pestered" them about the nature of their off-screen relationship. A magazine printed a story that they had admitted they were in a relationship and pictures of Vasquez with her arms around Bancks. Home and Away producers were "furious" with Vasquez and Bancks because they felt it ruined the show's image. But the pair denied the magazines claims. Bancks told Mary Fletcher from Woman's Own that as they were "spending eight hours a day as teenage sweethearts" made them contemplate a relationship, but they decided against it.

The two characters were involved in many "snogging scenes" and Vasquez said that she was single at the time which made the scenes easier to deal with. Sarah and Tug's first kiss was filmed during the school holidays. Vasquez said that filming the kiss was "quite nerve-racking" because there was a "circle of school kids" surrounding them. The actors were already nervous about the scenes, but having school children watching them made the situation worse. Bancks told Anthony that it was a "nightmare situation" and found the experience of kissing Vasquez in front of "seven hundred thousand people" really "strange". The fans even began to hassle Bancks as they had predicted that his character would be required to kiss Sarah. Vasquez said that working alongside Bancks on the Sarah and Tug romance for six months had resulted in them becoming "best friends". Vasquez later revealed that it was her first on-screen kiss and the "biggest thrill" to kiss Bancks. But Bancks said that it was "awkward" because they kept bumping their heads together.

The two characters become engaged, but Sarah later decides to hand the ring back to Tug. Vasquez explained that Sarah changes her mind because "Tug's problem is that he's unsure of himself because he hasn't had a good upbringing." But the actress believed that there was still hope for their relationship because Sarah is always there to give him the attention he needs. Sarah offers Tug "understanding and makes him a better person". Vasquez added that Sarah and Tug are "really two different people" but their commonality is that they "get on pretty well together".

Sarah also begins a relationship with Nathan Roberts (David Dixon). He attempts to convince Sarah to lose her virginity to him. The scenes formed the serial's annual cliffhanger storyline in 1993. Dixon told Richard Galpin from BIG! that Nathan gets her "in the back of my Charger, then I put the hard word on her and go for it". The actor did not entirely enjoy filming the scenes because he was too busy concentrating on his following lines. Like with Bancks, Vasquez took Dixon's first on-screen kiss.

== Storylines ==
Sarah arrives at Summer Bay High to enroll in Year 11 as the school near her father Matthew's farm has closed down. She talks to Donald Fisher (Norman Coburn) and Luke Cunningham (John Adam) but Matthew forces her to return home. After Luke argues the case for Sarah attending school, She begins staying with Donald's daughter, Bobby Marshall (Nicolle Dickson) and her husband Greg (Ross Newton). Sarah makes friends with Damian Roberts (Matt Doran) and shows some interest in him but he does not make a move. Tug O'Neale, however attracts Sarah's attentions and they become a couple. Sarah then meets Angel and they become the best of friends.

Sarah's relationship with Tug is met with several dramas. The first of which occurs when Sarah suffers a severe Asthma attack while in the bush and Tug runs for help. Sarah is then robbed while in the city and almost abducted. She is later fostered by Ailsa and her husband Alf (Ray Meagher) and befriends Roxanne Miller (Lisa Lackey) one of her teachers, who becomes a big sister figure to her. Sarah wins the female lead in the school musical arranged by Luke and Roxy but Tug is enraged when he finds out Sarah is starring opposite his nemesis Shane, who has taken the part as revenge for framing him for burglary. On opening night, Shane overdoes a kissing scene with Sarah, resulting in Tug punching him and ruining the show. Sarah is distraught and refuses to speak to either Tug or Shane again. Sarah, now single receives attention from her classmates but they cancel their dates. Angel suspects Tug is threatening them and sets Shane up as a decoy and convinces Tug that Shane and Sarah are seeing each other. Sarah quickly finds out and warns Shane but Tug attacks him. She then confronts Tug, forcing him to see the relationship is over and they agree to be friends.

Damian's older brother, Nathan is released from prison and Sarah falls for him. Damian and Tug try to warn Sarah but she will not listen and is convinced Nathan has changed and begins seeing him in secret when Alf and Ailsa disapprove. They are furious when they discover the relationship and ask her to leave. Sarah learns Nathan is behind a robbery at the school and admits she had been wrong about him, managing to patch things up with the Stewarts. Her friendship with Angel takes a dive when she discovers Angel wrote a story which is published in a magazine and finds it is clearly based on her experiences with Nathan. Sarah is angry for a while as she told Angel everything in confidence but eventually forgives her.

Following the Year 12 formal, Matthew suffers a heart attack and Sarah persuades the Stewarts to let him stay with them while he recovers. Matthew is keen to get Tug and Sarah back together so they can run the farm but Sarah dashes his hopes and later leaves Summer Bay to attend university after she lets Duncan (Lewis Devaney) wander out into the road while watching him. She returns in April 1995 to serve as Angel's bridesmaid at her wedding to Shane. In 2002, Alf mentions to a newly paroled Nathan (now played by Craig Ball) that Tug and Sarah have since married and are expecting their second child. Sarah returns three years later for Alf's 60th birthday, confirming she and Tug are still together.

== Reception ==
Anthony writing for BIG! said that "quiet" Sarah and "tough" Tug were not an obvious match. Justine Cullen from Inside Soap said that Sarah did not have a "lorra luck in love". The episodes featuring the climax of Tug and Shane's feud where Sarah is caught in the middle at the school musical were nominated for "Best Television Episode in a Serial Drama" at the Australian Film Institute awards in 1993.
