= Roxy Miller =

- Home and Away character
- Portrayed by: Lisa Lackey
- Duration: 1992–1995
- First appearance: 13 October 1992
- Last appearance: 9 February 1995
- Introduced by: Des Monaghan
In-universe information
- Occupation: Teacher
- Father: Les Bagley
- Mother: Carol Bagley
- Adoptive father: David Miller
- Adoptive mother: Pauline Miller
- Sisters: Imogen Miller (adoptive)
- Half-brothers: Blake Dean
- Half-sisters: Karen Dean
- Uncles: Kevin Bagley
- Nephews: David Simpson

Roxanne "Roxy" Miller is a fictional character from the Australian soap opera Home and Away, played by Lisa Lackey. She made her first screen appearance in the episode broadcast on 13 October 1992 and departed on 9 February 1995.

== Casting ==
Lackey played Roxanne from 1992 until 1995. Lackey was working as a model when she was approached by the producers of Home and Away to play Roxanne. She was due to fly out to Japan when the offer came through. Of her casting, Lackey told an Inside Soap writer "It literally came up out of the blue and I thought that acting is what I'd like to be doing in the next couple of years, so I just jumped at the chance."

== Development ==
Lackey described her character as "independent and strong willed". She stated further that Roxy does what she wants and is a bit of a matchmaker; she wants everyone she knows to be happy.

After his relationship with Lucinda Croft (Dee Smart) ended, Nick Parrish (Bruce Roberts) fell for Roxy in "a big way". Roxy believed Nick was still in love with Lucinda and she was wary of getting involved with him. When Nick's ex-girlfriend Sandy (Claudia Black) turned up in the Bay, Roxy decided to put him to "a love test", which he passed. Roberts commented that Nick fancied Roxy, but he did not want to get his heart broken again. Roxy eventually shared a "passionate kiss" with Nick and they began a relationship.

== Storylines ==
Roxy was the product of a brief marriage her parents Les (John Orcsik) and Carol had in their youth. Carol gave her up and she was subsequently adopted by David and Pauline Miller. When she was old enough, Roxy tried to track down her birth parents but Les sent word he wanted nothing to do with her. Roxy's long-lost half-brother Blake Dean (Les Hill) tracks her down. Blake tries to get her to take a job at their father's Restaurant in order for her to get to know Les without him knowing her true identity. The charade fails when Les fires Roxy and later hits her, warning her to stay away from him and his family. Blake takes Roxy back to Summer Bay with him to stay with his foster parents Alf (Ray Meagher) and Ailsa Stewart (Judy Nunn). Roxy begin receiving romantic overtures from local policeman Nick Parrish, but Blake warns her off him, since Nick has recently split from his fiance, Lucinda Croft. Nick's intentions are sincere but Roxy does not plan on staying in the Bay and puts some distance between them. As she is about to leave town, Nick races to the bus stop to persuade Roxy to stay. However, the relationship fizzles out almost immediately. After Nick's brother Shane (Dieter Brummer) is arrested and he and Roxy decide to be just friends.

Roxy meets her half-sister Karen (Belinda Jarrett) after she returns to the Bay on parole from juvenile detention but within a matter of weeks Karen and Blake leave for the city. Roxy, however, decides to settle in the Bay and teaches art at Summer Bay High. She befriends and later dates one of her new colleagues, Luke Cunningham (John Adam). She also takes Sarah Thompson (Laura Vasquez), who is staying with Alf and Ailsa, under her wing. Max McCarthy (Lloyd Morris), Roxy's ex-boyfriend begins badgering her constantly for money and threatens to have some swimsuit pictures of her published if she does not pay him. Roxy and Max try to double-cross each other but fail. The photos are published and Luke and Nick try to remove every copy of the magazine but Mangrove River resident Tug O'Neale (Tristan Bancks) manages to get hold of a copy and after clashing with Roxy at school, he plasters photocopies everywhere. Roxy, however, survives the scandal. Roxy's sister Imogen (Sofie Formica) visits and puts on a pleasant demeanor, masking her true intentions based on years of resentment for Roxy. Imogen then wages a campaign against Roxy after an attempt to seduce Luke fails. She hides Roxy's exam papers and sabotages her cakes. Ailsa quickly sees through this and Roxy realises her sister needs help but Imogen rejects her and leaves town, stating Roxy will never see her again.

Luke and Roxy's relationship suffers its biggest test when Luke is forced to care for his mentally disabled brother, Bill (Craig Beamer). They break up but find themselves getting closer again after working on the school musical together and renting the beach house from widower Greg Marshall (Ross Newton), also taking on effective responsibility for Tug, who had been living with Greg and his late wife Bobby (Nicolle Dickson). Roxy is stunned when Luke reveals he still has feelings for her and does her best to let him down gently. Soon after, Roxy begins seeing James Healy (Simon Baker), a new teacher who has taken over Luke's job. Suspecting they have little in common, James enlists Luke's help to persuade Roxy he is into the same books as her but Roxy quickly sees through his ruse. Although Luke manages to convince her James had meant well, James soon leaves town soon after being offered a better job. Roxy and James try to keep things going long distance but they soon fizzle out.

When a self-destructive Tug steals Roxy's car, she is forced to report him to the police and feels guilty when he is charged. She speaks in his defence in court, which enables to him escaping a custodial sentence. Roxy and Luke later learn Greg is selling the house and Roxy is horrified to learn Irene Roberts (Lynne McGranger) is an interested party and describes her as the landlady from hell, without realising her daughter Fin (Tina Thomsen) is in earshot. Irene responds by saying she will not keep Roxy on as a tenant so Roxy and Luke make plans to buy the beach house themselves. However, Roxy then decides to move back in with Sarah and the Stewarts.

Rob Storey (Matthew Lilley) returns to Summer Bay after some time away from the area, and is attracted to Roxy. She is unimpressed with him at first when he gets even with a driver who splashed his suit earlier, by putting a potato in the driver's exhaust pipe, but Roxy soon sees another dimension to Rob. After Roxy tells Rob of her feelings they begin a relationship, and are caught having sex on Donald Fisher's (Norman Coburn) kitchen floor by Irene. This soon becomes common knowledge much to the couple's embarrassment. While sharing a shower, Rob notices a lump in Roxy's breast and she is diagnosed with cancer. Rob supports her throughout and plans to propose until Roxy reveals she is not as serious about him. Roxy quietly leaves the Bay to undergo treatment. She later sends Alf and Ailsa a postcard and mentions she is living in Greece.

== Reception ==
Leo Roberts of the Daily Mirror branded her "Foxy Roxy". Jason Herbison from Inside Soap opined that Roxy "ruffled a lot of feathers" during her time in the show. A writer from All About Soap included the character in their "Hall of Fame" series and said that she and Rob were the "perfect couple". They opined that Roxy looked like the type of woman who "should wear a beret and a stripy T-shirt". Her painting style was described as "abstract" which did not "set the world on fire, but she used lots of bright colours and tried really hard". Roxy was "a hit" with the students of Summer Bay High because of her "mad creations" and the writer joked that Tracey Emin had better watch out. But they concluded that Roxy eventually became "disillusioned" by her art work.
