= List of Home and Away characters introduced in 1993 =

Home and Away is an Australian soap opera first broadcast on the Seven Network on 17 January 1988. The following is a list of characters that first appeared in 1993, by order of first appearance. They were all introduced by the show's then executive producer Andrew Howie, who had succeeded Des Monaghan. The 6th season of Home and Away began airing on 11 January 1993. In January, John Adam and Laura Vazquez began appearing as Luke Cunningham and Sarah Thompson, respectively. Melissa George arrived in March playing Angel Brooks, while Imogen Miller was introduced in April. David Dixon began playing Nathan Roberts in October. Simon Baker took on the role of James Hudson in November.

== Opening titles timeline ==
Color key
Main cast (opening credits)
Recurring guest star (closing credits in 3+ episodes)
Guest star (closing credits in 1–2 episodes)

Character	Actor	1993		
Character	Actor	1146–1210	1211–1305	1306–1375
Pippa Fletcher	Debra Lawrence	M	M	M
Sally Fletcher	Kate Ritchie	M	M	M
Ailsa Stewart	Judy Nunn	M	M	M
Alf Stewart	Ray Meagher	M	M	M
Bobby Simpson	Nicolle Dickson	M	M	
Donald Fisher	Norman Coburn	M	M	M
Adam Cameron	Mat Stevenson	M	M	M
Michael Ross	Dennis Coard	M	M	M
Nick Parrish	Bruce Roberts	M	M	M
Finlay Roberts	Tina Thomsen	M	M	M
Greg Marshall	Ross Newton	M	M	R
Sam Marshall	Ryan Clark	M	M	M
Damian Roberts	Matt Doran	M	M	M
Shane Parrish	Dieter Brummer	M	M	M
Luke Cunningham	John Adam	M	M	M
Roxanne Miller	Lisa Lackey	M	M	M
Tug O'Neale	Tristan Bancks	M	M	M
Sarah Thompson	Laura Vasquez	M	M	M
Angel Brooks	Melissa George		M	M

== Luke Cunningham ==
Luke Cunningham
- Home and Away character
- Portrayed by: John Adam
- Duration: 1993–1994
- First appearance: 12 January 1993
- Last appearance: 27 July 1994
- Introduced by: Andrew Howie
In-universe information
- Occupation: Teacher
- Brothers: Bill Cunningham

Luke Cunningham, played by John Adam, made his first appearance on 12 January 1993 and departed on 27 July 1994. Adam previously guest starred in the series in 1990 as soldier Dave Porter. In 1994, Adam was axed along with the characters of Sarah Thompson (Laura Vasquez), Tug O'Neale (Tristan Bancks) and Roxanne Miller (Lisa Lackey). The series Producers did not inform them about their departures and they read about it in an issue of TV Week.

Luke arrives in Summer Bay after taking a teaching post at the high school. His busking annoys Alf Stewart (Ray Meagher) and Michael Ross (Dennis Coard) who resolve to drive him out of town but Luke's new colleague Roxanne Miller informs them who he is and Michael agrees to rent a caravan to him. Luke offers saxophone lessons to Sam Marshall (Ryan Clark) and helps Damian Roberts (Matt Doran) with his training. He is also instrumental in getting Sarah Thompson and Angel Brooks (Melissa George) enrolled at school. Luke and Roxy become friends and begin dating. Roxy's sister Imogen (Sofie Formica) makes a play for Luke but he turns her down and she conspires to split them up by playing mind games with them. Ailsa Stewart (Judy Nunn) discovers Imogen's true intentions and Imogen leaves. Luke's mentally disabled brother, Bill (Craig Beamer) comes to visit. Luke feels responsible for his condition as he was meant to be watching Bill when he nearly drowned. He becomes over protective of Bill and disapproves of his friendship with Finlay Roberts (Tina Thomsen) as Bill is clearly attracted to her and he feels that he would not be able to cope with his feelings. Bill runs away after being caught by Michael in Fin's room while she is asleep. Bill is found after a gruelling search and Luke decides to send him to stay with their aunt. This proves to be the end for Luke and Roxy's relationship as he has been focused on Bill. Luke and Roxy remain working together closely and take charge of the school musical. The musical is a disaster when Shane Parrish (Dieter Brummer) and Tug O'Neale come to blows, forcing the show to be cancelled.

Luke and Bobby Marshall (Nicolle Dickson) accept a boat ride from Adam Cameron (Mat Stevenson) at the Bay's carnival. Luke warns Adam to slow down but it is too late and he hits a log causing the three of them to be thrown from the boat. Luke suffers cracked ribs while Bobby sustains a head injury which leaves her comatose and she is later declared brain dead. Luke urges Adam to make a confession. Bobby's widower Greg (Ross Newton) then leaves Summer Bay and rents the Beach House to Luke and Roxy, who inherit Tug as a fellow boarder. Luke's feelings for Roxy resurface but she rebuffs him after he kisses her. His mood is not helped when new janitor Nathan Roberts (David Dixon) begins antagonising him. Luke grabs Nathan after he goads him and Nathan alleges Luke hit him. After failing to convince anyone of his innocence, Luke quits. He is exonerated when Nathan is arrested for stealing from the school but Donald Fisher (Norman Coburn) tells him he will have to reapply. James Hudson (Simon Baker) ends up taking Luke's job and dating Roxy much to his ire. However, within several weeks James leaves the Bay and Luke is rehired.

Irene Roberts (Lynne McGranger) buys the house and lets Luke and Tug stay as her tenants. After Irene sleepwalks into Luke's bedroom, He worries she is attracted to him and he talks to her about it, only Irene begins to think he is after her. Luke and Irene have a further misunderstanding when Luke plays a joke on Irene by inviting Donald to dinner and convincing her she likes him. However, the plan backfires. Luke notices Tug is dyslexic and persuades him to go back to school. He then suggests Tug take classes with tutor Beth Armstrong (Toni Pearen).

Donald's daughter Rebecca (Danielle Carter) takes a job at the school and Luke seems interested in her but the fact Donald disapproves of her having a relationship causes him to steer clear. When they do eventually get together, Luke decides he is not that keen and ends things. Although Rebecca ultimately forgives him, Donald is furious that she has been humiliated and begins making life difficult for Luke. Upon learning his mother has fallen ill, Luke resigns to go and take care of Bill in the city but clears the air with Donald before leaving.

"Channel 5 chose the episode featuring Luke's debut as one of their favourite ever Home and Away episodes". In 2018, Alan Loughnane from Joe critiqued Luke's characterisation stating that "Luke Cunningham was getting far too cheeky with Alf back in the day. Although, if we had that glorious hair, we'd probably be insufferably cocky as well."

== Sarah Thompson ==
Sarah Thompson, portrayed by Laura Vasquez, made her first appearance on 26 January 1993 and departed in October 1994. Vasquez returned in 1995 and 2005 to guest star. She described her "biggest breakthrough" career wise as her final screen test for the role of Sarah. In 1994, Vasquez left Home and Away to pursue a career in music. But a writer from TV Week claimed that Vasquez discovered that Sarah was being written out after they published the story in their magazine. Lisa Anthony of BIG! Magazine said that "quiet" Sarah and "tough" Tug were not an obvious match. The episodes featuring the climax of Tug and Shane's feud where Sarah is caught in the middle at the school musical were nominated for "Best Television Episode in a series Drama".

== Angel Parrish ==
Angel Parrish portrayed by Melissa George, made her first appearance on 30 March 1993 and departed on 30 August 1996. George and a friend, Cara Mitchinson both acted in a mock episode of Home and Away with a video camera playing Bobby and Sophie Simpson respectively. When the offer of a role on the series came, George's parents convinced her to relocate from her native Perth to Sydney and she began lodging with families. George met with casting director Liz Mullinar and was subsequently cast in the role. George's portrayal of Angel earned her "Most Popular New Talent" and "Most Popular Actress" Logie Awards.

== Imogen Miller ==
Imogen Miller
- Home and Away character
- Portrayed by: Sofie Formica
- First appearance: 15 April 1993
- Last appearance: 12 May 1993
- Introduced by: Andrew Howie
In-universe information
- Father: David Miller
- Mother: Pauline Miller
- Sisters: Roxanne Miller (adoptive)

Imogen Miller, played by Sofie Formica, made her first appearance on 15 April 1993. Home and Away marked Formica's first acting job in a major television series. She was offered the role shortly after she interviewed Lisa Lackey for another show. Formica was contracted for six weeks.

Imogen is Roxanne Miller's (Lackey) younger, adopted sister. She arrived in Summer Bay with "a chip on her shoulder the size of Ayers Rock" due to living in the shadow of her more successful sister. Formica commented that anything Roxy had, Imogen wanted including her boyfriend Luke Cunningham (John Adam). Formica explained, "Part of it is that she really fancies him, but I think the real reason is that he's her sister's boyfriend. Imogen is a little bit bitter and twisted and there's a great rivalry between the two sisters." Formica enjoyed playing Imogen, as she was so dissimilar to herself. She also called Imogen "a total bitch".

Imogen tries to seduce Roxy's boyfriend Luke Cunningham, but he rebuffs her. Roxy tries to set Imogen up with Nick Parrish (Bruce Roberts), who is interested in her but Imogen is firmly set on Luke and tries to get him alone at every opportunity. She begins stealing Roxy's exam papers and sabotaging her cakes in order to make her look bad. It is discovered that Imogen has resented Roxy for years due to jealousy. Ailsa Stewart (Judy Nunn) quickly sees through Imogen's innocent act. Roxy reaches out to her but Imogen rejects her help and leaves town telling her she will never see her again.

== Kevin Baker ==
Kevin Baker
- Home and Away character
- Portrayed by: Wesley Patten
- First appearance: 13 August 1993
- Last appearance: 6 October 1993
- Introduced by: Andrew Howie
In-universe information
- Brothers: Lenny Baker

Kevin Baker, played by Wesley Patten, made his first appearance on 13 August 1993. Patten was the series's first Aboriginal actor. He felt it was "about time", explaining that Australian soaps are shown all around the world, and viewers think Australia is "a white middle class suburb." Home and Away also marked the first time Patten had been cast as "a well written, fully rounded character", following a guest appearance in A Country Practice. Patten's casting attracted attention in Australian media, as a lot of Aboriginal actors were being cast in period shows and films, and his role was considered "pretty radical". Kevin and his brother Lenny Baker (Michael Watson) rescue Roxanne Miller (Lisa Lackey) and Sarah Thompson (Laura Vasquez) when their car breaks down and they become stranded. Patten described his character as "a really nice guy – he'll do anything to help anyone and he really sticks by his brother." Patten was keen to stay with Home and Away for longer, but producers took fan mail and viewer feedback into account before extending contracts, and he admitted that his kind of fans did not write into a soap.

Kevin is the younger brother of mechanic Lenny Baker (Watson). When Lenny helps Roxanne Miller (Lackey) and Sarah Thompson (Vasquez) with their car, Roxy suggests Kevin enrol in Summer Bay High and Lenny agrees. On his first day, Kevin is involved in argument with Shane Parrish (Dieter Brummer) and there is ill-feeling between the two which culminates in a series of dares; one of which is to abseil down the local lighthouse. Kevin and Shane's hostility ceases when Shane notices Kevin has a talent for painting and talks him into a money making scheme. However, Kevin feels uncomfortable and destroys a painting. Shane then backs out of the business in order to salvage their friendship.

== Nathan Roberts ==
Nathan Roberts
- Home and Away character
- Portrayed by: David Dixon (1993–1994); Craig Ball (2002)
- Duration: 1993–1994, 2002
- First appearance: 18 October 1993
- Last appearance: 12 April 2002
- Introduced by: Andrew Howie (1993); Julie McGuaran (2002)
In-universe information
- Occupation: Janitor (1993–94); Waiter (2002); Deckhand (2002)
- Father: Murdoch Roberts
- Mother: Irene Roberts
- Brothers: Damian Roberts
- Sisters: Finlay Roberts
- Half-brothers: Mick Jennings
- Aunts: Wendy McFarlane
- Nephews: Paul Roberts; Mark Roberts
- First cousins: Nelson McFarlane

Nathan Roberts, played by David Dixon, made his first appearance on 18 October 1993. and departed on 4 February 1994. When the character returned in 2002, Craig Ball was cast in the role.

Nathan arrives in Summer Bay and causes trouble with the local residents. Dixon told Richard Galpin from BIG! magazine that Nathan gets into everything and does everything; adding "shit, come to think of it, I think I [Nathan] get into a fight with everybody". He explained that his character steals cameras, money and even attempts to "steal" Sarah Thompson's (Laura Vasquez) virginity. Nathan lures Sarah into the back of his car and seduces her in scenes which served as Dixon's first on-screen kiss. He revealed that he did not enjoy filming the tryst because he was too busy concentrating on speaking the following lines. Nathan's scenario with Sarah causes angst between him and her ex-boyfriend Tug O'Neale (Tristan Bancks). During one fight scene with Bancks in which Tug was supposed to "shove" Nathan after he brands him a "jerk", Dixon complained that Bancks actually caused him pain. Of Nathan's enemies he gains Dixon stated: "Tug goes from hating me to loving me to hating me. Damian Roberts (Matt Doran) hates, loves, and then hates me. Alf Stewart (Ray Meagher) haaaates me! Luke Cunningham (John Adam) really hates me, and Adam Cameron (Mat Stevenson) loves me." Dixon remained in the role for a period of three months and when he finished filming he spoke of resuming his career in music.

In 2012, Lynne McGranger who plays Irene Roberts, told a writer from What's on TV that she would "love" her on-screen son Nathan return to the series. She added that the "last time we saw him he was off touring with an Irish nurse. So I think he's gone back to Ireland and is going to get married there. So I think Irene should go over to Ireland to see him."

In April 1994, BIG!'s Galpin said that Nathan caused havoc in Summer Bay by "getting up just about everybody's noses".

Nathan arrives in Summer Bay on parole from Juvenile detention and moves in with Irene and Adam. He claims to be a reformed character but steals a caravan park customer's camera. Adam quickly sees through Nathan's act and threatens to expose him. Nathan catches the eye of Sarah and they begin dating much to anger of Sarah's ex-boyfriend, Tug. Sarah's foster parents disapprove of Nathan and they forbid her to see him. Nathan's influence over his younger brother, Damian is a concern. Nathan then decides he wants to take things further with Sarah and the pair sneak off at an end of Year party and prepare to have sex in Nathan's car. Alf catches them and punches Nathan, resulting in him being arrested. Nathan decides to drop the charges. While working as the Janitor at the school, Nathan is tempted by $900 in school fees and steals the money from Donald Fisher's (Norman Coburn) office. Damian suspects him immediately but Sarah refuses to believe it. He is eventually found to be the culprit and is jailed. The following year it is revealed Nathan paid his cellmate Brian "Dodge" Forbes (Kelly Dingwall) to kill his estranged father, Murdoch (Tom Richards).

Nathan is paroled in 2002 and returns to Summer Bay to live with Irene after his sister, Finlay (Tina Thomsen) throws him out. He encounters Alf who is still harbouring a grudge and clashes with Nick Smith (Chris Egan) at every turn. Irene finds him a job as a waiter at the Beachside Diner but after Colleen Smart (Lyn Collingwood) informs locals about Nathan's time in prison and customers boycott the restaurant. Leah Patterson (Ada Nicodemou) has no choice but to sack Nathan after takings are low. Nathan then begins drinking heavily. He steals Alf's Ute and but notices a bus carrying a group of Year 10s, which Nick is among, has crashed and helps rescue them before the vehicle explodes. Nathan is hailed a hero and interviewed by a local news station. He then takes an interest in Nick's nurse Grace O'Connor (Mary Docker). Alf offers Nathan a job on his boat as a deckhand and he accepts. For a 30th birthday present, Irene arranges for Nathan to take a joyflight and he enjoys it. When he learns Grace is about to leave for Alice Springs, Nathan decides to leave with her and bids Irene an emotional farewell.

== James Hudson ==
James Hudson
- Home and Away character
- Portrayed by: Simon Baker
- Duration: 1993–1994
- First appearance: 19 November 1993
- Last appearance: 16 February 1994
- Introduced by: Andrew Howie
In-universe information
- Occupation: Teacher

James Hudson, played by Simon Baker, made his first appearance on 19 November 1993. Baker was contracted for eight weeks, and he admitted that he accepted the role because "it's work, it pays the bills and it's a return to the daily grind." James works as a photography teacher at the school. He also moves into the Beach House with Roxanne Miller (Lisa Lackey) and Luke Cunningham (John Adam). In December 1993, Alex Cramb from Inside Soap reported that executive producer Andrew Howie was impressed with Baker's work in the guest role and wanted to sign him up for a long-term basis. The writer added that James would become romantically involved with Roxy following her break-up with Luke.

Producers set up "a classic love triangle" to entice viewers over the Australian summer months. In his book Super Aussie Soaps, Andrew Mercado notes that Roxy and Luke's relationship was "left on shaky ground thanks to her growing friendship with James". Baker viewed his character as an "opportunist", saying "I think James is a pretty forward kind of guy. I think he is aware of the presence of another man in the house but he doesn't let it get in the way. If anything, it makes it more interesting, an added level of excitement." Baker thought that James does not mean to rub it in with Luke, but it is obvious to him that Luke is jealous of his friendship with Roxy. He also thought James enjoyed infatuation, and the excitement of starting a new love affair and getting to know a person. The situation between James and Roxy soon becomes intimate and Lackey told a reporter from Soap that "even I was shocked how quickly that happened". James and Roxy begin dating but their relationship is short-lived and does not remain in Summer Bay after Roxy breaks up with him. Soap later featured a story confirming that James had been written out of the series. Their columnist reported that Baker had argued with producers over storylines and the actor added "you're not paid to have views – you're paid to button your lip and churn it out."

The columnist from Soap said that James was "nasty", "dastardly" and bemoaned him as the "boo-hiss supply teacher who arrived to take Luke Cunningham's job and ended up taking his woman too." They added that it was "steamy stuff for the normally coy Home and Away". In 2012, Channel 5 chose the episode in which James tries to woo Roxy as one of their best ever episodes from the past twenty-five years.

James arrives in Summer Bay to fill a teaching position vacated by Luke. Luke is annoyed as he had reapplied for the position and matters are not helped when Luke's housemate and ex-girlfriend Roxy invites James to move in with them at the beach house. There is an attraction between James and Roxy and James enlists Luke's help to win Roxy's heart. Luke suggests feigning an interest in the same things that interest Roxy, but Roxy sees through the ruse. James soon leaves town soon after being offered a better job. Roxy and James try to keep things going long distance but they agree to break up.

== Others ==
Date(s)	Character	Actor	Circumstances
11–15 January	Knuckles	Brendon Walker	Knuckles, Dixon and Ashley are Shane Parrish's (Dieter Brummer) cellmates when he is imprisoned in a juvenile detention centre. Knuckles begins bullying Shane and ordering him around. When Shane refuses to comply Knuckles threatens to have Dixon beat him up. Ashley tells Shane if he wants an easier life, he should go along with Knuckles' requests which include providing tapes and smuggling alcohol into their cells. Eventually, Shane is officially released but escapes before he can get the news.
11–15 January	Dixon	Wayne Roberts	Knuckles, Dixon and Ashley are Shane Parrish's (Dieter Brummer) cellmates when he is imprisoned in a juvenile detention centre. Knuckles begins bullying Shane and ordering him around. When Shane refuses to comply Knuckles threatens to have Dixon beat him up. Ashley tells Shane if he wants an easier life, he should go along with Knuckles' requests which include providing tapes and smuggling alcohol into their cells. Eventually, Shane is officially released but escapes before he can get the news.
11–15 January	Ashley	Troy Livermore	Knuckles, Dixon and Ashley are Shane Parrish's (Dieter Brummer) cellmates when he is imprisoned in a juvenile detention centre. Knuckles begins bullying Shane and ordering him around. When Shane refuses to comply Knuckles threatens to have Dixon beat him up. Ashley tells Shane if he wants an easier life, he should go along with Knuckles' requests which include providing tapes and smuggling alcohol into their cells. Eventually, Shane is officially released but escapes before he can get the news.
26 January–31 August 1994	Matthew Thompson	Jeff Truman	Matthew is Sarah Thompson's (Laura Vasquez) father. He is resistant to the idea of Sarah starting Year 11 at Summer Bay High after the school near their farm closes. Luke Cunningham (John Adam) visits the farm and convinces Matthew to let Sarah attend school. The following year, Matthew suffers a heart attack and Sarah asks her guardians Alf (Ray Meagher) and Ailsa Stewart (Judy Nunn) if Matthew can stay to recover. He is keen to get Sarah back together with her ex Tug O'Neale (Tristan Bancks) so they can run the farm but Sarah dashes his hopes by telling him she and Tug will not reunite and Matthew returns home, but not before offering Tug a job, which he later accepts.
29 January–9 February	Max McCarthy	Lloyd Morris	Max is Roxanne Miller's (Lisa Lackey) ex-boyfriend, a photographer who begins blackmailing her with some old swimsuit and nude pictures. Roxy and Max try to double-cross each other but fail. Despite, Roxy's best efforts to keep them secret the photos are published. Once Max sees Roxy survive the humiliation, he leaves.
22 February–26 April	Dale Ross	Olivia Alfonzetti	Dale is the newborn son of Pippa (Debra Lawrence) and Michael Ross (Dennis Coard). They hold a naming day for him with all their friends and family present. One afternoon, Pippa finds Dale not breathing and phones for an ambulance. The paramedics do all they can to resuscitate Dale but it is too late. The cause of his death is determined to be SIDS (Sudden Infant Death Syndrome). The episode featuring Dale's death, won the Australian Film Institute award for Best Episode In A Television Drama series in 1993. It was presented to executive producer, Andrew Howie. "Channel 5 chose the episode as their favourite ever Home and Away episodes".
24–25 February	Mavis Brown	Mary Haire	Mavis is Tug O'Neale's (Tristan Bancks) aunt who takes him in following his father, Roy's (Mervyn Drake; Ruselll Keifel) imprisonment. Mavis decides to leave the bay and wants Tug to move with her but he refuses and lodges at the Beach House instead.
22 March–16 August	Gloria James	Jacquelyn Jones	Gloria is a friend of Sally Fletcher (Kate Ritchie). She and Sally fall out when Sally tries to fit in with the "cool" crowd and dates Craig Bentley (Daniel Knight).
8–22 April	Terry Wells	Dominic Condon	Terry is an Encyclopedia Sales Representative who hires Adam Cameron (Mat Stevenson) and Shane Parrish (Dieter Brummer) to work for him, selling encyclopedias in the Summer Bay area. He is unimpressed when he learns that they given away a promotional set and tells them they owe $400.
14 April	Celebrant	Louise Cullen	The Celebrant who conducts Dale Ross' (Olivia Alfonzetti) Naming Day ceremony at Summer Bay House.
29 April–13 May 1994	Pianist	Ray Alldridge	A Pianist who plays music during auditions The Summer Bay High production of the musical Riff Raff and the Rehearsals for the Debutante Ball in the Surf Club.
30 April–14 July	Michelle Carter	Zoe Emanuel	Michelle is a girl in Year 11 who is interested in Shane Parrish (Dieter Brummer) but he uses her in order to get Damian Roberts (Matt Doran) to quit the local football team by arranging a date with her and Damian. They go on a date but when Michelle runs into an old friend, Regine and gets talking to her, Damian breaks the date. Michelle then takes an interest in Tug O'Neale (Tristan Bancks) and he begins flirting with her in order to make Sarah Thompson (Laura Vasquez) jealous, which it does. Michelle reappears a few months later when Adam Cameron (Mat Stevenson) tries to set her up with Tug again but Tug is hurting after his breakup with Sarah.
6–14 May	Brad	Tim Campbell	Brad is a soccer player for the Yabbie Creek Eagles, a rival team to the Summer Bay Sharks. During a match, Brad fouls Tug O'Neale (Tristan Bancks) resulting in a penalty.
7 May	Minister	Kenny Graham	The minister who presides over the funeral of Dale Ross (Olivia Alfonzetti).
21 May–8 July	Fiona Harris	Olivia Pigeot	Fiona meets Greg Marshall (Ross Newton) when he helps her find her toddler son, Toby. When Fiona takes a job as a housekeeper for Donald Fisher (Norman Coburn), Things get awkward but she and Greg grow closer and begin an affair, which is quickly discovered by Nick Parrish (Bruce Roberts), and almost discovered by Damian Roberts (Matt Doran). After Greg's wife Bobby (Nicolle Dickson) finds out, Fiona leaves Summer Bay to live with her parents.
21 May–29 June	Toby Harris	Carl Snell	Toby is Fiona's toddler son.
21 May–6 July	Bill Cunningham	Craig Beamer	Luke Cunningham's (John Adam) brother. Bill is mentally impaired following a near-drowning accident as a toddler that left him starved of oxygen. Luke is protective of him and lobbies for him to begin Year 11 classes but it is a disaster when Tug O'Neale (Tristan Bancks) makes fun of him for his learning disabilities. Bill befriends Finlay Roberts (Tina Thomsen) and is attracted to her. He tries to steal chocolates from Alf Stewart's (Ray Meagher) store to impress her but is caught. Fin's foster father Michael Ross (Dennis Coard) catches Bill in Fin's room while she is asleep and Luke admonishes him. Bill runs away into the bush but is found and sent to live with an aunt.
2 June–23 July	Laura Brennan	Kris McQuade	"Loony" Laura lives in a shack near the caravan park. She is hostile towards Damian Roberts (Matt Doran) when he runs through the area near her home. It is revealed Laura used to be a runner and she trains Damian. Laura often keeps herself to herself and is wary of townspeople as she was accused of murdering her boyfriend 15 years earlier and Damian's attempts at trying to get her to re-integrate with the community often leave her enraged. While discussing the recent death Pippa Ross' (Debra Lawrance) son, Dale (Olivia Alfonzetti), Laura reveals to Damian that she herself had lost a child some years earlier. After talking with Pippa, Laura decides to leave Summer Bay and reconnect with her estranged family. Before leaving, she gives Damian her stopwatch.
25–28 June	Steven Potter	Matthew Reeder	Steven, known as Spotter, to his friends is a surfer who shows an interest in Sarah Thompson (Laura Vasquez). They agree to a lunch date but Sarah's ex-boyfriend, Tug O'Neale (Tristan Bancks) scares Spotter out of the dates.
15 July–17 August	Craig Bentley	Daniel Knight	Craig is a boy in the "Cool" crowd who Sally Fletcher (Kate Ritchie) attempts to impress. Sally undergoes an initiation to join the crowd where she sings on snooker table for a dare and later drinks alcohol. Craig is impressed and they begin dating. However, the relationship is not to last.
15 July–17 August	Kym	Jennifer Hardy	Kym is a popular girl in Year 8 who pressurises Sally Fletcher (Kate Ritchie) to fit in with her group at school. She issues Sally a series of humiliating and dangerous tasks as way of initiation into the group.
13–30 August	Lenny Baker	Michael Watson	Lenny is a mechanic who helps Roxanne Miller (Lisa Lackey) and Sarah Thompson (Laura Vasquez) when they are stranded in the bush. After some persuasion from Roxy, He agrees to let his younger brother Kevin (Wesley Patten) live in Summer Bay attend the local High school.
26 August–31 July 2000	Minister	Alan Tobin	The minister who presides over the funeral of Bobby Marshall (Nicolle Dickson). He later conducts Ken Smith's (Anthony Phelan) funeral.
7 October–31 March 1994	Robyn Marsh	Mona Ramadan	Robyn is an aerobics instructor who runs a class at the Surf Club, which Luke Cunningham (John Adam) and Roxy Miller (Lisa Lackey) attend. Luke and Robyn get along well and he invites her to a party at the beach house. When Luke and Roxy return from a walk during the party, they return to find Robyn leaving with one of Luke's friends. Irene Roberts (Lynne McGranger) later invites Robyn to the Beach House for dinner, with the intent of setting her up with Luke. Luke is annoyed at first but Robyn tells him she understands.
26 October-3 November	Barry Logan	Douglas Hedge	Barry is the president of the Summer Bay bowls club. He takes an instant dislike to Irene Roberts (Lynne McGranger) and they bicker. Irene humiliates Barry by pushing him on the green, making a mess of his trousers. Barry then stands for re-election as club president and Alf Stewart (Ray Meagher) runs against him. Barry wins but Irene discovers no president can serve more than three consecutive terms and Alf wins by default.
27–28 October	Chopper	Paul Caesar	Chopper is the leader of a gang of criminals who menace Shane Parrish (Dieter Brummer) and Angel Brooks (Melissa George) on their train home from a night out in the city. Chopper and his friends threaten the couple and the situation looks dangerous until the rail staff appear and chase the gang off. Chopper then flees with Angel's bag.
5–9 November	Spud	Glen Hoare	Spud is Chopper's brother. He breaks into Donald Fisher's (Norman Coburn) house but is caught by Shane Parrish (Dieter Brummer) who tackles him and ties him up. Shane tells Angel Brooks (Melissa George) to call the police but she feels sorry for Spud and listens to his story about being on the streets. Shane eventually lets Spud go, much to his regret.
