= Frank Morgan (Home and Away) =

Fictional character in Home and Away

- Home and Away character
- Alex Papps as Frank Morgan
- Portrayed by: Alex Papps; Bradley Pilato (Flashback); Michael Scilusa (Flashback)
- Duration: 1988–1989, 1991–1992, 2000, 2002
- First appearance: 17 January 1988
- Last appearance: 30 May 2002
- Introduced by: Alan Bateman (1988); Des Monaghan (1991); John Holmes (2000); Julie McGauran (2002)
- Book appearances: Home and Away: The Frank Morgan Story; Home and Away: Bobby and Frank; Home and Away: Family Matters
In-universe information
- Occupation: Shop assistant Office assistant
- Father: Les Morgan
- Mother: Helena Morgan
- Wife: Bobby Simpson (1989–1990); Roo Stewart (1990–1991)

Frank Jonathan Morgan is a fictional character from the Australian Channel Seven soap opera Home and Away, played by Alex Papps. Frank debuted on-screen in the show's pilot episode and was the first character to appear. Frank is one of the five foster children of Pippa (Vanessa Downing) and Tom Fletcher (Roger Oakley) who move to Summer Bay to begin a new life. The serial's creator Alan Bateman thought of the idea while observing the locals of a rural town in New South Wales opposing the idea of foster children living in the area. Papps was cast into the role and immediately began receiving fan mail. Frank has been played by actors Bradley Pilato and Michael Scilusa during flashback sequences.

Frank fills the role of the serial's first heart-throb and he sports a "trademark mullet". With a backstory consisting of an alcoholic mother and a criminal father, Frank became wayward by the age of eight. However, Pippa and Tom helped him to change his ways. Frank's main narrative is themed with romance – during his tenure his main love interests are Roo Stewart (Justine Clarke) and Bobby Simpson (Nicolle Dickson). Roo becomes pregnant by Brett Macklin (Gerry Sont) and she deceives Frank into believing that he is the father. Frank decides to marry Roo and their ceremony was dubbed a "shotgun wedding" by the media. Roo jilts Frank at the altar and reveals the truth – which results in Frank having a car accident. Frank and Bobby then start a relationship and soon marry; but both Papps and Dickson felt that their characters were too young. Papps left the series in May 1989 to join the cast of The Flying Doctors. Frank's departure storyline soon aired with his marriage to Bobby failing and him leaving her to be with Roo. Papps returned to the series in 1991 for the annual cliff-hanger episode. Frank fails to win Bobby back from her new love Greg Marshall (Ross Newton). He returned again for guest stints in 2000 and 2002.

The character became known for his "hunky" appearance and was often labelled a heartthrob. While Frank and Roo's wedding became infamous – a writer from Inside Soap said that it was one of the greatest moments in the genre. A columnist from TV Life said that Frank lead a troubled life. While Matt Buchanan from The Sydney Morning Herald said that he could not even remember the character. Off-screen the role had propelled Papps into fame and he was a firm favourite with viewers. The actor was never comfortable with the attention he received from the public. He has spoken of dismay of the "hype" surrounding the role as he believed it to be misplaced. However, Papps was still being recognised as the character twenty years later.

== Creation and introduction ==
Home and Away was created by Alan Bateman. His inspiration developed after witnessing a foster home being built in a remote town in New South Wales and the locals opposing the idea of "degenerate kids running riot". Bateman thought it would create a good basis for a new television series. Home and Away initially focuses Pippa (Vanessa Downing) and Tom Fletcher (Roger Oakley) on who move to the rural town of Summer Bay with their five foster children – one of these being Frank. Over three hundred young actors auditioned for the roles of the foster children. Bateman said that the foster children were played by professional actors and not just model types.

The cast filmed the pilot in 1987. Papps' casting was announced ahead of the series debut. The series first aired on 17 January 1988 on the Seven Network. Frank was the first character to appear, although a Police officer (Bruce Venables) spoke the first piece of dialogue. Frank was played by Bradley Pilato in the scene, which was set in 1978 as a young Frank tries to escape from the Police officer. The series then switches to 1988, where Frank is one of five foster children alongside Carly Morris (Sharyn Hodgson), Steven Matheson (Adam Willits), Lynn Davenport (Helena Bozich) and Sally Fletcher (Kate Ritchie). Tom loses his job in the city and moves the Fletcher family to the town of Summer Bay.

== Character development ==
=== Characterisation ===
In Frank's backstory, he is a product of a broken home, born to a criminal father and an alcoholic mother. His father was sent to prison and his mother became incapable of looking after him. As a result, Frank became wayward, but that changed after he was fostered by Pippa and Tom. Frank's ethnicity is Greek Australian; and he fills the role of the serial's first heart-throb. He is characterised as having "streetwise ways" and a "disarming smile". Frank has rock and roll ambitions because he has never been academically successful. He faced hardship to get through school. Frank only just managed to pass his exams into Year 10. However, his ambitions are reachable as the "only thing" he is good at is playing the guitar. Frank wants to get a job and form his own band.

In Kesta Desmond's Home and Away Annual, he is described as being "coaxed away from a life of crime" by Tom and Pippa. Frank enjoys a "relatively stable home life" which they provide for him. In his book Home and Away Special, said that Frank had was "streetwise" by the age of eight, when he first "fell afoul of the law". Papp's mullet hair style became a trademark of Frank. Papps said that it was fashionable at the time and while he had originally sported the style for a previous project, it "evolved into the Home and Away mullet". Papps told Clayden that Frank was so ignorant that at times he wanted to "shake him".

=== Roo Stewart ===
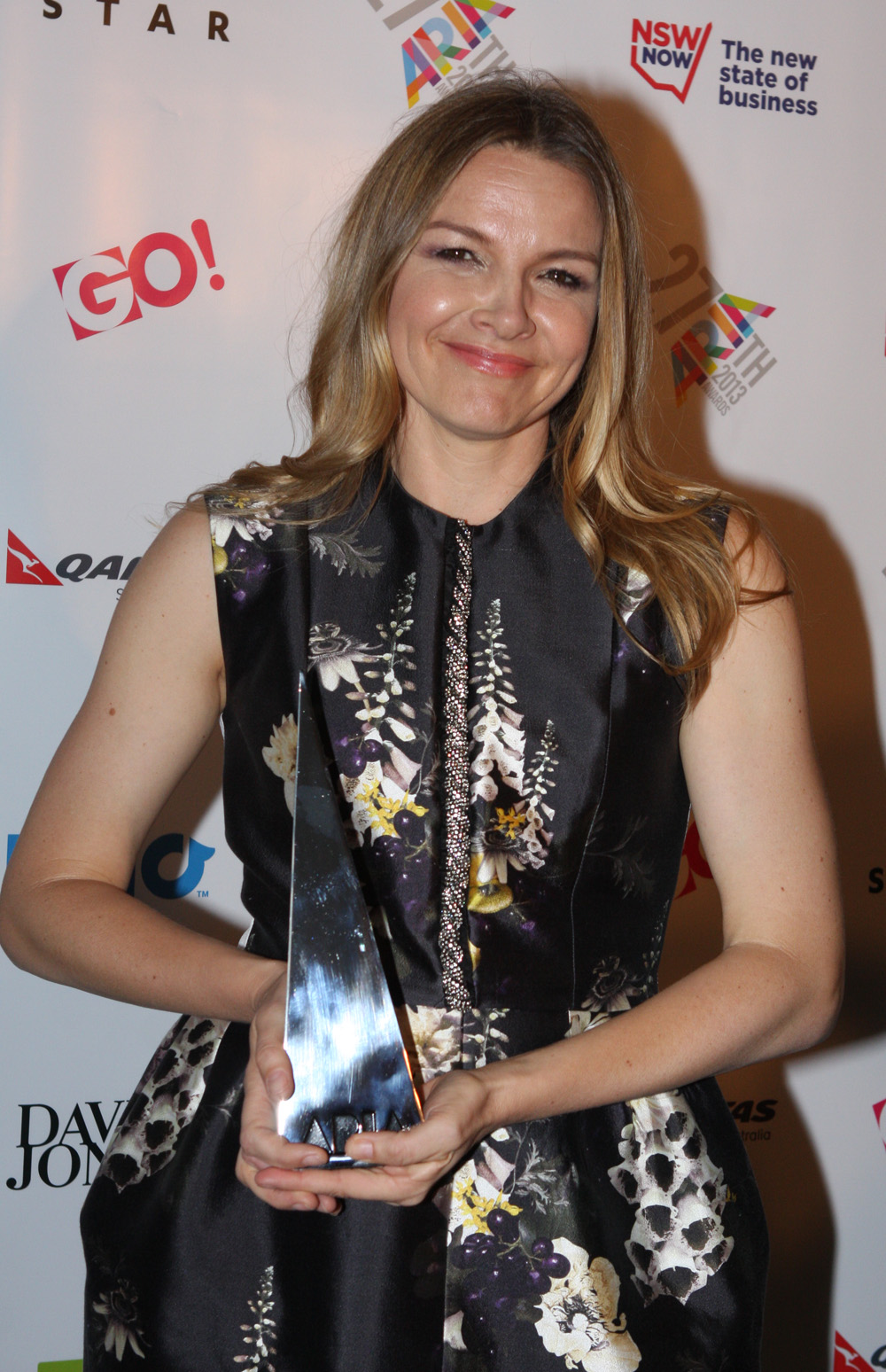
Justine Clarke (pictured) plays Roo Stewart.

Frank is given a love interest in the form of Roo Stewart (Justine Clarke). In the storyline Roo becomes pregnant by Brett Macklin (Gerry Sont) and tells Frank that he is the father. The character fills the role of "the bitch" and the storyline turned Roo into a public hate figure. While doing promotional events, Clarke was called a "slut" for Roo's deception of Frank. Clarke had tried to lead a normal life away from filming, she even left her home phone number in the telephone directory. She was forced to change her number after fans repeatedly rang her asking how Frank was and what would happen next in their storyline.

Frank and Roo decide to get married because she is pregnant. Downing said that the serial was approaching sex before marriage in a liberal way. The writers dealt with it "sensibly" because Frank and Roo make up their own minds. She added that it was important to let teenagers show their maturity if they want to marry. Roo keeps her baby's paternity a secret until the wedding day. In the middle of exchanging vows, Roo decides to be honest and tells Frank the truth. A wedding scenario had been planned for Roo, by the serial's writing team from the off-set. Bateman said that the wedding was not just to attract more viewers. He opined that people think that weddings were always based on the "consummation of love". Roo and Frank's wedding highlighted that it does not always work that way. The wedding episode resulted in a ratings boost and heightened media interest for Home and Away. Magazines and newspapers labelled it as a "shotgun wedding". Frank and Roo's wedding storyline was also covered by TV Week as their main story. Papps and Clarke were the first ever Home and Away cast members to feature on the cover of the magazine. Papps told J Clayden that Frank would never get over Roo lies about the baby's father. When Frank learns the truth, he leaves Roo at the altar. He then crashes his car and which leaves Frank in a coma.

"Instead of saying 'I do' when she walked down the aisle with Frank, she said, 'I can't; it's not your baby.' He ran out of the church, got in the car and drove off a ravine."

— Clarke recalling Frank and Roo's wedding day. (2011)

When Roo gives birth to Martha (Burcin Kapkin) prematurely she calls out Frank's name. It was a "poignant moment", of which Clarke said "Roo wants him because she is still in love with him. But it is here she finds out that Bobby Simpson (Nicolle Dickson) and Frank are together." Roo cannot handle Frank moving on with Bobby and Clarke added that Roo would do anything to be with Frank again.

=== Bobby Simpson ===
When Bobby's friend Alan Fisher (Simon Kay) dies, it has an upsetting effect Bobby. Papps told J Clayden that "When Alan is dying; Frank sees a sensitive side to Bobby which he likes. They've always been close." Frank later begins a relationship with Bobby; Papps thought that his character's romance with Bobby was more genuine than the one he shared with Roo. Dickson told Catherine Maloney from TV Guide that she was nervous about Bobby and Frank's first kiss. She explained that she had not kissed anyone in the business before and was fretting while filming. Papps told Dickson: "Shut up and kiss me" and they played out the start of their characters romance. The actress stated that her character just puts on a "tough exterior" but longs for somebody. She added that during the storyline, viewers had sided with Bobby and not Roo.

"There was a lot of fuss around us getting dolled up, and it was the 80's, so I've got my hideous mullet."

— Papps on Frank and Bobby's wedding day 26 years later. (2015)

The serial's writers decided that Frank and Bobby should marry; but were unsure how viewers would react. Papps and Dickson embarked on a promotional event in a shopping centre. Their presence attracted crowds and Papps shouted "let's have a scream from those who want Bobby and Frank to marry". The crowds went "berserk" and voiced their approval – which gave the go ahead for their on-screen marriage plans. The storyline played out on-screen when Frank decides that he should ask Bobby to marry him, despite still feeling hurt by Roo's actions. He picks Bobby up from school wearing a tuxedo in a Rolls-Royce and takes her to a picnic in the woods. He sets up a meal of fish and chips. Frank proposes and says; "I can't offer you a Rolls-Royce lifestyle but you can have a life of fish and chips with me." Frank also writes a song titled "When Best Friends Fall in Love" and this was played during the scenes. They later face problems and Frank takes Bobby to his childhood home and he explains to her about how important marriage is to him. In the episode Frank also has flashbacks of his childhood; in which he was played by Michael Scilusa. Dickson told J Clayden that everyone wants her character to attend university and "Bobby knows that getting married isn't the right thing to do [...] but she doesn't want to lose Frank."

Papps revealed to a reporter from TV Life that he would never marry as young as Frank did. While he told Eithne Power of TVTimes that he thought Frank and Bobby rushed into marriage without any "proper understanding of each other". Frank thinks that marriage is a partnership where he will be "strong, the big provider and the breadwinner". Papps said that it was a "chauvinist view" but due to his childhood he wants the option of security. Papps said that Bobby wants the same because of her bad childhood, but they both "approach marriage from different angles." Dickson agreed and admitted that there were times she wanted to scream at Bobby and tell her to "get her act together" where their marriage is concerned. Frank later decides to comfort Roo when Brett blackmails her to get access to Martha. Bobby becomes jealous and paranoid. Dickson said that "Bobby has caught Frank on the rebound, and she knows it. Frank is the closest thing poor Bobby has ever had". Tom thinks that their marriage was a mistake, Dickson said that "deep down" Bobby knows that is too young, but she is a character "who can't be told".

=== Departure and returns ===
Papps decided to leave Home and Away to join the cast of The Flying Doctors; but he was still contracted to appear as Frank until May 1989. The actor told TV Guide's Maloney that he would miss his fellow cast members the most because he had become very close to them. However added that he was looking forward to a "less hectic work schedules and a change of routine". He later told Desmond that "the danger in staying in soap too long is that people start seeing you as that character." Dickson revealed that the rest of the cast were behind the idea of Frank's exit storyline. They did not want him to be killed off because that would have been "too boring". She added that the serial's producer accepted their idea of Frank leaving "with a bang".

In 1991, Papps reprised the role for four weeks. Franks return with the build-up to Home and Away's annual "cliff-hanger" episode. The storyline featured Frank's attempts to win Bobby back. However, she is now engaged to Greg Marshall (Ross Newton). Dickson told Robyn Willis of The Sun-Herald that choosing between Frank and Greg is a "difficult decision" for Bobby. Dickson added that her character is "split in half" because for different reasons, one half of her wants to be with Frank, while the other wants to be with Greg.

In 2000, Papps filmed a guest appearance as Frank, which sees him attend the wedding of his foster sister, Sally. Papps returned once again in 2002 as part of a special fourteenth anniversary storyline. When Frank returns he reveals that when he finished traveling, he had decided to settle down in Sydney "living a quiet life". In 2010, Papps joined the serial's writing team. He said that he enjoyed writing for the character of Roo, who was reintroduced into the series. He also remained open minded about Frank returning to the series.

== Storylines ==
The series begins while set in 1978, as Frank gets into trouble with the law. Mr. Jarvis (John Stone), a man from the department of child services, explains that Frank's father Les (Mario Kery), is a criminal and his mother, Helena (Lee Sanderson) is an alcoholic. As he grows up he aspires to emulate Les' criminal dealings. Pippa and Tom take Frank in as their first foster child. Upon moving to Summer Bay, Frank tries to get a job in Alf Stewart's (Ray Meagher) shop where he meets Roo. Frank is attracted to Roo and tells Alf that he had been helping Roo with her school work. Alf gives him the job alongside helping Roo with her studies. Frank is not good with school work so he pays his foster brother, Steven to do it for him. They begin dating, but Alf becomes angry with Frank for convincing Roo to skip school. The pair nearly sleep together, but Roo asks him to wait.

Frank tires of Roo being mean to Ailsa Hogan (Judy Nunn) and they split up. Alf sends Roo to boarding school in the city. Frank decides that he misses her and tracks her down. He gets into a fight with Roo's new boyfriend, Brett. Roo returns to Summer Bay, hiding the fact that she is pregnant. Roo schemes to get Frank to sleep with her and Alf to catch them in bed together. Alf sacks Frank, but Ailsa employs him instead. Roo later announces that she is pregnant by Frank, and Alf believes her as he caught them having sex. Frank then agrees to marry Roo. Floss McPhee (Sheila Kennelly) has a vision that Bobby causes a car crash which kills Frank. When he buys a car with a similar registration number, Bobby vandalises it. Tom then buys him a new vehicle with another similar registration. Bobby warns Frank that Roo is using him but he refuses to listen. On his wedding day, Pippa convinces Frank not to drive his car because of Floss' vision. When he turns up to the ceremony, Roo changes her mind about marrying Frank and reveals that the baby is not his. Frank speeds off in his car and crashes off the road to avoid knocking Bobby down. He survives the accident and Bobby tells Frank that she loves him. He tells her that while he has no intention of reconciling with Roo, he still loves her.

Frank decides to move in with Narelle Smart (Amanda Newman-Phillips) to have time away from the Fletcher home. Frank realises that he likes Bobby when she spends time with Alan and Brett. While working for the Macklins, Stacey (Sandie Lillingston) is annoyed when he accuses Brett of theft and gets Frank demoted and replaces him with Tom. Frank tells Bobby who kisses him and they start a relationship. Bobby is later injured during a robbery and loses her memory. He plays her tapes to try to help her remember. When Bobby makes a full recovery, they decide to get married. They soon argue about Bobby wanting to attend university. He manages to save their relationship by taking Bobby to his childhood home and explains what getting married means to him. He then helps Bobby find her birth parents. Frank and Bobby marry and he support her through her issues her parents. When Brian "Dodge" Forbes (Kelly Dingwall) sets fire to the shop below Frank's flat, they find a body which is believed to be Frank's. However, he later arrives at the caravan park and the body is identified as Philip Matheson (John Morris). Frank and Bobby move in with her father Donald Fisher (Norman Coburn). Their relationship begins to fail and is not helped when Bobby scares away Peter Bedford (Bevan Wilson), a potential client for Frank and Tom. Frank realises that he still loves Roo and leaves Summer Bay. He soon reunites with Roo and they later marry.

Two years later after splitting up with Roo, Frank returns to Summer Bay to get Bobby back, who is now engaged to Greg. Frank asks her to marry him instead and she agrees. Their engagement annoys most of the town's residents who do not approve. Bobby later tells Frank that she cannot marry him and he leaves town again. He returns a decade later to attend Sally's wedding to Kieran Fletcher (Spencer McLaren) and walks her down the aisle with Steven and for another visit in 2002 to celebrate the town's sesquentenary and meets with Floss and has a flashback to his accident fourteen years earlier.

== Reception ==
=== Critical analysis ===
Lucy Clark of The Sun-Herald said that Frank was "a bit of a toughie" and correctly predicted that he would "become a childhood sweetheart of teenage girls across the country". Michael Quin of the Melbourne Weekly said that Papps will always be remembered to "legions of Australian girls" as "Frank Morgan: the hot guy with the mullet". Robin Oliver writing for The Sydney Morning Herald said that Frank was Home and Away's "good-looking young hero". Linda Barnier and Ben Doherty of The Newcastle Herald summed Frank up as "the bloke who married tomboy Bobby after he left Roo at the altar, after he recovered from a serious car accident that left him in a coma at a general hospital and before he ran off to the States for a sea change." Doherty also named Frank an "old favourite" of the series. Although Matt Buchanan from The Sydney Morning Herald admitted that he could not remember the name of the character that Papps "once pretended to be". Helen Mitchell of the Evening Times said that "hunky Frank" was Home and Away's answer to Michael J. Fox and "the local heart-throb".

Eamonn McCusker of The Digital Fix said that Frank was a "decent-but-dim sort of man". He thought that Frank made a habit of walking down the aisle. McCusker also opined that the serial's romances were "relatively straightforward affairs"; but thought all that changed with the Frank/Roo/Bobby storyline. A columnist from TV Life said that Papps was the "resident heart-throb" and Frank did not have a problem free life and was much "better at guitar than academic work". Jason Herbison from All About Soap described Frank stating he is "Sally's older, rebellious foster brother. He eventually cleaned up his act and left town to go overseas."

A writer from Inside Soap included Frank and Roo's "shotgun wedding" in their "great moments in soap" feature. They opined that "it was destined to be the wedding from hell" and noted that it "certainly went with a blast". The writer added that nothing could have made the wedding more entertaining because it had "a congregation of jilted ex-lovers, an illegitimate child and a very dodgy motor." A fellow columnist from Inside Soap later named Frank's proposal of marriage to Bobby as "golden moment in soap". They said that "there was never a soap romance more turbulent as Frank Morgan and Bobby Simpson's". They opined that Bobby had always fought a losing battle to win Frank's love and that admitted their sadness that "the tale turned sour". Discussing Frank and Bobby, a reporter from Soap World wrote "this torturous, star-crossed path to the altar and back broke H&A fans' hearts." Inside Soap ran a feature compiling "The 100 greatest soap stories ever told". They featured Frank and Roo's wedding story as their 66th choice.

=== Actor's popularity ===
"Girls scream and send me all this fan mail. But I won't let all that go to my head. I got into acting because I like it, not for all the fame and publicity. I find all the recognition more and more uncomfortable."

— Papps on his Home and Away popularity. (1989)

The role made Papps a favourite with the viewers, won him many fans and made him famous. The Seven Network received fan mail for Papps before the series even debuted. While interviewed in 1989, Papps explained that he would never admit to being the "sex symbol" that he was labelled as. He thought it was "nice to be loved and accepted" but the fame the role generated became an "intrusion" on his privacy. He told TVTimes' Power that he could not relate to the perception of him and added "I know who I am and I'm not the person hyped out there".

Papps was still recognised as Frank in public twenty years later, despite mainly playing the role in his teenage years. Papps told Kate Ritchie on Nova 93.7, that the attention he received from Home and Away fans "wasn't as mental as people would like to think". Due to his popularity he said that he avoided many situations which would become "mental". He chose not to attend promotional appearances for the serial, aside from those he was obliged to do.

== In other media ==
In 1989 a book titled Home and Away: The Frank Morgan story was released. It was written by Elizabeth Coleman, concentrates on Frank's backstory, including his relationship with his parents and old friends. In addition it features stories from Frank's time in the actual series. Later that year the book Home and Away: Bobby and Frank, written by Margaret Pearce, was released as a tie-in novel about Frank and Bobby's marriage. He also appears in Mark Butler's novel Home and Away: Family Matters, which follows the character of Roo and her relationships with Frank and Brett.
