= Greg Marshall (Home and Away) =

- Home and Away character
- Portrayed by: Ross Newton
- Duration: 1991–1993, 2000
- First appearance: 20 September 1991
- Last appearance: 3 March 2000
- Introduced by: Des Monaghan (1991); John Holmes (2000)
In-universe information
- Occupation: Mechanic; Lorry driver
- Wife: Bobby Simpson (1992–1993)
- Sons: Sam Marshall

Greg Marshall is a fictional character from the Australian soap opera Home and Away, portrayed by Ross Newton. He made his first on-screen appearance on 20 September 1991. Newton departed the show in 1993, before making a brief return in 2000.

== Casting ==
Newton told Glenn Wheeler of The Morning Show that joining the cast of Home and Away "was a wonderful opportunity because it was in its early stages of being a success story as a show". Newton later told a 7NEWS reporter that joining the show early on was an "amazing" experience. He added "we had no idea that it would become what it's become - and I'm proud to have played a part in it." During his time on the show, Newton, who is openly gay was advised by a Home and Away producer to keep his sexuality a secret.

== Character development ==
In The Official Home and Away Annual, John Kercher described Greg as a long distance truck driver who arrives in Summer Bay with the "bombshell" that he is the father of Sam (Ryan Clark). Greg had a "whirlwind" romance with Jackie Nicholls (Erica Williams) and she became pregnant. As Greg was only eighteen he decided he was not ready for commitment and became a truck driver and "led a nomadic life driving from one town to another". Greg enjoyed driving, but "yearned for some sort of stability" and became curious about his son.

Greg and Bobby Simpson (Nicolle Dickson) marry. Dickson told Chris Pritchard from Woman's Own that "Bobby yearns for a superman to keep her happy", but "this is not a marriage made in heaven". She added that their wedding ceremony was touching.

Newton decided to leave the role in 1993.

== Storylines ==
Greg arrives in Summer Bay in search of his son Sam Nicholls, who he had walked out on when he was young leaving Sam to be brought up by his mother, Jackie. Greg learns Sam has been fostered and applies for custody. Bobby, Sam's foster mother, tries to keep Greg away from him and her friend constable Nick Parrish (Bruce Roberts) warns him off when he turns up at Sam's school but Greg persists. As he and Bobby began to spend time together, they develop feelings for each other and he moves in with Bobby and Sam so they can be a family.

Frank Morgan (Alex Papps), Bobby's ex-husband, returns to the Bay trying to win Bobby back. Bobby initially chooses Frank but quickly changes her mind. Greg is upset when he learns what she did but they soon reconcile. Greg enlists the help of Sam and Adam Cameron (Mat Stevenson) to record a video message asking Bobby to marry him. Bobby falls asleep while watching it and arguments prevent Greg from showing it to her. Eventually, Sam plays the tape for a delighted Bobby, then plays it again when Greg is present, allowing Bobby to accept. They later marry with all of their friends in attendance. The marriage is plagued by financial problems and constant arguments. Greg begins a job working for Michael Ross (Dennis Coard) at the boat shed and clashes with Adam over the best way to repair an engine but is proved right, resulting in Adam quitting and Greg staying on. Further arguments ensue when Bobby offers a home to Sarah Thompson (Laura Vasquez) and later Tug O'Neale (Tristan Bancks). Greg is not particularly happy with Tug due to his reputation around town but relents when he saves Sarah's life when she has an asthma attack.

Greg meets single mother Fiona Harris (Olivia Pigeot) and helps her find her missing son Toby (Carl Snell). They become fast friends and Fiona later takes a job working for Bobby's father Donald Fisher (Norman Coburn) as a housekeeper. Greg feels uncomfortable due to his attraction to Fiona. They begin an affair but Nick and Damian Roberts (Matt Doran) find out. Fiona leaves town and Greg confesses to Bobby who is furious and throws him out. She eventually forgives him and they talk of plans to start a family. However, soon after, Bobby is injured in a boating accident along with Adam and Luke Cunningham (John Adam) and rendered comatose for several weeks. The doctors declare Bobby brain dead and Greg agrees to having the life support machine switched off. Greg is inconsolable with grief and is enraged when he finds that Adam is culpable and throws him out, refusing to forgive him. When Adam arrives at the church to pay his last respects Greg attacks him but is stopped by Michael and Alf Stewart (Ray Meagher).

Greg decides to take a job as a lorry driver but it means he is unable to look after Sam. He leaves him in Donald's care, supposedly as a temporary measure, but later gives permission for him to be fostered by Michael and his wife Pippa (Debra Lawrance), admitting he will not be returning. Greg returns seven years later to visit Sam and reveals he has been living in Queensland with a new partner. He offers Sam the chance to come and live with him to make amends for cancelling an earlier visit. Sam agrees but changes his mind when realises how much Donald cares for him and decides to stay in the Bay.

== Reception ==
The Morning Show's Wheeler opined that Greg formed a part of one of Australian television's "much loved families". In 2019, Susannah Alexander from Digital Spy opined that Greg "made a real impression on fans during the '90s" via his stories with Bobby and Fiona.
