= Luke Cunningham =

Luke Cunningham may refer to:

- Luke Cunningham (Home and Away), a character in Home and Away
- Luke Cunningham (Ninjago), a character in Ninjago
