= Just Cause (TV series) =

- Created by: Gail Morgan Hickman; Jacqueline Zambrano
- Written by: Gail Morgan Hickman; Jacqueline Zambrano
- Starring: Elizabeth Lackey; Shaun Benson; Richard Thomas; Khaira Ledeyo; Mark Hildreth; Jason Schombing; Roger R. Cross
- Opening theme: Two Trains by Sue Foley
- Country of origin: Canada
- Original language: English
- No. of seasons: 1
- No. of episodes: 22

Production
- Executive producers: Kevin DeWalt; Gail Morgan Hickman; Jacqueline Zambrano
- Production locations: San Francisco, California
- Running time: 42 minutes
- Production companies: Paxson Entertainment; W Network; Minds Eye Pictures

Original release
- Network: W Network (Canada); Pax (USA)
- Release: September 15, 2002 – May 18, 2003

Just Cause is a Canadian legal drama television series that aired on the W Network in Canada and Pax in the United States from September 15, 2002 to May 18, 2003.

== Plot ==
Five years ago, Alexandra DeMonaco (Elizabeth Lackey) went to prison for a crime she didn't commit. Unaware that her no-good husband was running a medical insurance scam, she became a scapegoat for a publicity-hungry District Attorney, while her husband disappeared with five million dollars and their daughter.

Instead of wasting time on self-pity while incarcerated, Alex goes to law school on the internet and gets her law degree. Now out on parole, she has two goals: to find her daughter and to become a lawyer. But a convicted felon can't practice law. So Alex goes to Hamilton Whitney III (Richard Thomas), a successful, well-respected San Francisco attorney, who also happens to be a friend of the governor. Alex wants Whitney to help her petition the governor for a pardon. To pay her way, she goes to work in Whitney's law firm as an office assistant. Her sassy, brash personality bumps hard against Whitney's stuffy, reserved Waspyness, and their relationship is not always smooth.

Their view of the law is different as well. Whitney is more interested in how much his well-heeled clients are willing to pay, while Alex is determined to use the law to help people like herself who have been abandoned by the system. Gradually Alex's idealism wins Whitney over. Now they work together to champion underdog cases and achieve justice for the less powerful.

== Cast ==
- Elizabeth Lackey as Alexandra DeMonacco
- Richard Thomas as Hamilton Whitney III
- Shaun Benson as Patrick Heller
- Khaira Ledeyo as Peggy Tran
- Mark Hildreth as Ted Kasselbaum
- Jason Schombing as Dave Kaplan
- Roger R. Cross as C.J. Leon

== Production ==
Filming was done in Vancouver, British Columbia, but the series is set in San Francisco, California.

== Episodes ==
No.	Title	Directed by	Written by	Original release date
1	"Pilot"	Bill Corcoran	Jacqueline Zambrano & Gail Morgan Hickman	September 15, 2002
2	"Pilot"	Bill Corcoran	Jacqueline Zambrano & Gail Morgan Hickman	September 15, 2002
3	"Human Trials"	Rob King	Raymond Hartung	September 22, 2002
4	"Above the Law"	Holly Dale	David Abramowitz	September 29, 2002
5	"Lama Hunt"	Rob King	Laurence Frank	October 6, 2002
6	"Tanya with an O"	John L'Ecuyer	Thorn McShane	October 22, 2002
7	"Code of Silence"	Ken Jubenvill	Greenville Case	November 3, 2002
8	"Bet Your Life"	Unknown	Unknown	November 4, 2002
9	"Making News"	Unknown	Unknown	November 11, 2002
10	"The Last to Know"	Unknown	Unknown	November 18, 2002
11	"Fading Star"	Unknown	Unknown	November 25, 2002
12	"Wives of Christmas Past"	Unknown	Unknown	December 9, 2002
13	"Death's Details"	Unknown	Unknown	January 12, 2003
14	"Dream House"	Unknown	Unknown	February 2, 2003
15	"Buried Past"	Unknown	Unknown	February 9, 2003
16	"Dying to Be Thin"	Unknown	Unknown	February 16, 2003
17	"Lies, Speculations and Deception"	Unknown	Unknown	February 23, 2003
18	"Hide and Seek"	Unknown	Unknown	March 30, 2003
19	"Reasonable Doubts"	Unknown	Unknown	April 27, 2003
20	"Blackboard Jungle"	Unknown	Unknown	May 4, 2003
21	"Trial by Memory"	Unknown	Unknown	May 11, 2003
22	"The Closing"	Unknown	Unknown	May 18, 2003

== Awards and nominations ==
Helen Shaver won a Gemini Award for Best Director in a Dramatic Series for her work on the episode "Death's Details", and Richard Schwadel won the Leo award for Best Picture Editing on the episode "Above the Law".

Additionally, it was nominated for another Gemini and Leo, and a Directors Guild of Canada award.
