= Damian Roberts =

- Home and Away character
- Portrayed by: Matt Doran (1991–1996); Ben Hamilton (1997 flashbacks)
- Duration: 1991–1996
- First appearance: 6 November 1991
- Last appearance: 15 March 1996
- Introduced by: Des Monaghan (1991, 1992); John Holmes (1995, 1996)
In-universe information
- Occupation: Student at Summer Bay High (1992–94); University Student (1995); Priest (1996–)
- Father: Murdoch Roberts
- Mother: Irene Roberts
- Brothers: Nathan Roberts
- Sisters: Finlay Roberts
- Half-brothers: Mick Jennings
- Aunts: Wendy McFarlane
- Nephews: Paul Roberts; Mark Roberts
- First cousins: Nelson McFarlane

Damian Roberts is a fictional character from the Australian Channel Seven soap opera Home and Away, played by Matt Doran. The character debuted on-screen during the episode airing on 6 November 1991, and departed on 15 March 1996. Ben Hamilton played a young Damian in flashbacks in 1997.

== Casting ==
Damian was Doran's first "big" television role. He told a writer from Inside Soap that he was given no time to prepare and he was attending school one day and the next filming for the show. His teachers attempted to convince him to stay at school instead, but he thought that the role too much of a "wonderful opportunity" to give up. He was also signed to a "long contract" with the show. In September 1994, Justine Cullen from Inside Soap announced that Doran had quit the show in order to pursue other projects. Doran told Cullen that "I'm to make horror movies". In July 1995, David Brown of TV Week reported that Doran had reprised his role, as Damian returns from university. Jason Herbison from Inside Soap said that Damian has "thrown off his clean cut image" by having his hair in dreadlocks.

== Development ==
Damian is characterised as a wayward teenager who keeps his problems to himself. Doran believed that this made Damian his own worst enemy at times. He had a troubled upbringing which lead him to become wayward. Doran told a TVTimes reporter that he bottles up all his problems, whenever something happens to him he keeps it to himself." Damian is the son of Irene Roberts (Jacqui Phillips) and the younger brother of Finlay (Tina Thomsen) and Nathan (David Dixon). In The Official Home and Away Annual John Kercher describes the Roberts children's backstory as their suffering Irene's continuous gambling and their alcoholic father, Murdoch (Tom Richards) walked out and left them "to fend for themselves". As Irene was "rarely around", Finlay decided to help bring Damian and Nathan up.

Playing a character whose mother suffers from alcoholism was a challenge for Doran. He told Inside Soap's that he had never seen his own mother drunk. So Doran "absolutely no idea what it must be like to be in Damian's shoes". He did not find it easy imagining how Damian should react to Irene's behavior. In is "hard" for character and he is in a constant dilemma because "at the same time as being treated so badly by his mother, he really loves her". He finds himself stuck between "loving her and wanting to support her and protecting himself and his own life". Doran revealed that he and Phillips had built a good rapport while working on the storyline. He also praised her acting abilities because she would transform into Damian's "nightmare of a mother" during filming. In the Home and Away – Official Collector’s Edition, Andrea Black detailed Damian's early development. In one of the Roberts siblings first storylines with their alcoholic mother, Irene falls down the stairs and claims that Damian and Finlay pushed her. Irene later wants Damian to leave with her, but Finlay manages to convince Damian to live his life in Summer Bay. Finlay's influence on Damian helped the "troubled" character "stay on the right track".

In 1992, Richard Norton who plays Simon Fitzgerald was told that his character was being written out of the series. Norton told Josephine Monroe from Inside Soap that producers informed him that they were more interested in "pushing" Doran and Dieter Brummer (who plays Shane Parrish) to develop their characters instead of Simon. Black stated that Doran and Brummer "became teen idol pin-ups as soon as they arrived in Summer Bay".

Writers developed a friendship between Damian and Shane, which an Inside Soap writer called "an unholy alliance". Damian went along with Shane's dubious scams and they often had scrapes with the law, but they always stuck up for each other.

In another story, Damian and Shane are accused of committing a robbery at the Kiosk store. Damian was grounded by his foster parents Michael (Dennis Coard) and Pippa Ross (Debra Lawrance). Damian is found alone and wandering around in the middle of the night, when the crime took place. Michael is furious with Damian for disobeying his punishment and considers returning him to live with Irene. Shane's brother Nick Parrish (Bruce Roberts), a serving police officer also defends them. Despite this the remained of Summer Bay residents are quick to accuse them of committing the robbery. Doran told a TVTimes writer that "Damien's lead astray because he's never really had a close friend and doesn't want to let Shane down." He added that both Damian and Shane had troubled childhoods but Shane had emerged stronger than him. He concluded that "together they spell trouble."

However, when Kelly Chan (Theresa Wong) enrolled at Summer Bay High both boys fell for her and things turned nasty. Brummer commented "There's certainly a lot of tension in the air." Kelly became more interested in Shane, but when she learned that he had lied about his court appearances, she turned to Damian and they went on a date. The magazine writer revealed "But things turn sour for the teenagers after Damien lies about what they got up to on their first date! Like most boys, he tries to impress the lads with tales of kissing and midnight fumbles - which of course aren't true." Kelly decided she was better off being single and Shane and Damian fell out with each other. Doran told a writer from Look-in that the longer Damian and Shane are friends then the more likely he is to get into trouble. he explained that this was due to Shane being a "crazy kid". Doran and Brummer were good friends too. The camera crew labelled them "the overtime boys" because they would mess up their lines so the crew would earn overtime from retakes. Doran hoped that Damian would become more of a "goody goody" character in order to have a relationship. He added that "Damian needs some romance in his life".

== Storylines ==
Damian is brought to Summer Bay by his alcoholic mother Irene in order to use him to emotionally blackmail his sister Finlay, who ran away and is living with Michael and Pippa, into going home. The plan backfires when Damian tells Finlay he is happy she has escaped Irene, convincing her to stay. A few months later, Damian contacts Finlay and reveals he has run away too. Finlay and her friend Sophie Simpson (Rebekah Elmaloglou) hide him in the bush while Irene searches the town for him but when Pippa learns the truth she says they have to inform Irene. However, when Irene attempts to take him home, Damian reveals that he is scared of being beaten by Irene, showing the bruise she gave him, and Pippa refuses to let him go with her. Irene attempts to take him back by force, then tries to blackmail him and Finlay by threatening to charge them with assault. She eventually accepts they are better off where they are and Finlay and Damian are officially fostered by Pippa and Michael.

Damian quickly runs afoul of school bully Tug O'Neale (Tristan Bancks). Fin's friends Blake Dean (Les Hill) and Simon Fitzgerald attempt to help him out by threatening Tug and forcing him to let Damian beat him in a fight. However, when Damian begins using the victory to stop Tug picking on others, he ends up agreeing to a rematch and Fin admits the truth to Damian. Damian is reluctant to fight Tug again but after he goads Damian, Damian knocks him to the ground. Damian gains a friend in classmate Shane Parrish, who soon gets him into trouble by stealing headmaster Donald Fisher's (Norman Coburn) car. Damian attempts to impress Shane by putting red paint into Donald's golf bag and Michael and Pippa are shocked he'd acted alone. Damian balks, however, when Shane robs the surf club kiosk and threatens to say Damian was in it with him if he tells anyone. Damian is threatened by Adam Cameron (Mat Stevenson), who is being blamed for the robbery, and when he and Fin tell Adam the truth, Adam forces Shane to return the money anonymously.

Damian helps Shane in his revenge campaign against Ryan Lee (Alistair McDougall), who has been having an affair with Lucinda Croft (Dee Smart), the fiancé of Shane's brother Nick. The pair's friendship is tested when they are both attracted to new student Kelly Chan. Shane steps aside but when Damian tries to kiss her Kelly make it clear she only sees him as a friend. Damian feels betrayed when Shane then starts dating Kelly and punches him in the Diner but they make up after Kelly leaves town.

Damian supports Shane when Tug frames him for burglary and hides him when he escapes from juvenile detention until his name is cleared. He also befriends two other new arrivals in town, Sarah Thompson (Laura Vasquez) and Angel Brooks (Melissa George), and helps set the latter up with Shane. He and Fin are shocked when Irene (now played by Lynne McGranger) returns, having turned over a new leaf, and have difficulty trusting her. Damian learns that Laura Brennan (Kris McQuade), a reclusive woman living in the area, is a former professional runner and manages to convince her to train him, as well as helping her go into business with Alf Stewart (Ray Meagher) selling organic vegetables. Damian is mortified when Sally Fletcher (Kate Ritchie), his foster sister, develops a crush on him and kisses him when he is asleep and even more so when Shane reveals the fact to the whole school.

When Shane and Angel go through a rough patch, Damian realises he has feelings for her but Angel gently tells him she does not see him like that. She does agree to accompany him to a presentation as his date when he wins a writing award but has to pull out when Shane arranged a date for the same night, although Sarah attends in Angel's place. Damian begins taking French language lessons and finds himself attracted to his tutor Cathy (Joy Smithers), a married woman whose husband works away as a lorry driver. Shane encourages him and Damian is on the verge of telling her how he feels when her husband walks in. Angel and Sarah, who mistakenly believe Shane is having an affair with Cathy, inadvertently save his blushes by bursting into the house at that moment.

After failing to revise the correct material for his exams, Damian steals Donald's exam papers. Shane, Angel and Tug are blamed for cheating until he admits the truth. Damian's brother Nathan is released from prison and arrives in Summer Bay. Nathan, who beat Damian when they were younger, claims to be a reformed character and Damian decides to give him a chance until he commits a robbery at the school. Damian keeps it a secret until he is forced to step in when Sarah is being threatened by Nathan, who is then arrested for his crimes. Damian leaves for University but returns to be the best man at Shane and Angel's wedding. He sleeps with Irene's lodger Selina Cook (Tempany Deckert) who becomes pregnant and feels unable to support her. He feels guilty when she miscarries and apologises. When Damian learns that his father Murdoch had harassed Selina, he tells Nathan; Murdoch is then murdered when Nathan sends his cellmate Brian "Dodge" Forbes (Kelly Dingwall) after him. Damian is left feeling somewhat lost and, after a talk with Selina, before he finally decides to become a priest. He last appears when he visits Angel to help her get over Shane's death.

== Reception ==
A reporter from BIG! wrote that through playing Damian, Doran had become "one of the world's most popular soap stars" and gained many "girl fans" who "adored him". A columnist from Shout said that "poor old Damian" filled his on-screen time with a hobby of jogging but there was "no sign of a girlie". They said that the character needed a relationship storyline, adding "when will Matt Doran finally get to have a major on-screen smooch, that's what were asking".

A writer from Inside Soap said that Damian was in for more "ridicule" when Shane sets him up on a blind date. They added that "naturally it’s a complete disaster, just like everything else Damian's life. And unfortunately for Damian things are never going to get better, because the sad fact is, he's just another soap wimp." They also opined that the character "is always going to be a loser". While a fellow writer added that he lacked confidence, but Laura (Kris McQuade) did a "brilliant job" of boosting Damian's self-esteem and proved to be a "great mate". Kate Langbroek from The Age branded Damian as the show's "residential intellectual" and joked that he was also "smart enough to leave Summer Bay".
