= John Adam (actor) =

Australian actor

- Born: Brisbane, Australia
- Education: National Institute of Dramatic Art
- Occupation: Actor
- Years active: 1975–present
- Known for: Home and Away; City Homicide

John Adam is an Australian television and theatre actor. He has had three roles in the soap opera Home and Away as Dave Porter (1990), Luke Cunningham (1993–94) and Senior Detective Atticus Decker (2016). From 2009 until the series' cancellation, Adam starred as Detective Senior Constable Nick Buchanan in City Homicide. He has also appeared in Water Rats, All Saints and Neighbours, as well as various theatre productions.

== Early life ==
Adam was born in Brisbane and he spent the first year and a half of his life in Charleville. His father's job as a salesman saw the family move to Minnesota in the United States for four years. Upon their return to Australia, they moved to Sydney. Adam is a graduate of National Institute of Dramatic Art (NIDA).

== Career ==
Some of Adam's early television appearances included guest roles in A Country Practice, G. P., and E Street. In the early 1990s, Adam played Bassanio in The Merchant of Venice, Laertes in Hamlet and the Earl of Richmond in Richard III for Bell Shakespeare. He also worked with the Sydney Theatre Company. From 1993 to 1994, Adam portrayed teacher Luke Cunningham in Home and Away. It was his second role in the show, having previously appeared as Dave Porter, a friend of Ben Lucini (Julian McMahon), in 1990. Producers asked Adam to return to the show four times, before he accepted the role of Luke.

In 1997, Adam had a recurring role as Michael Jeffries in Water Rats. The following year, he starred as Peter Carter in Tony Morphett's thriller television film 13 Gantry Row, opposite Rebecca Gibney. He appeared in All Saints in 1999 as Dr. Tom Snowden.

In 2009, he appeared in Underbelly: A Tale of Two Cities, before joining the main cast of crime drama City Homicide as Detective Senior Constable Nick Buchanan. Adam relocated to Melbourne with his family for filming. In 2010, while working on City Homicide, Adam was also appearing in Dead Man's Cell Phone at the Melbourne Theatre Company.

Adam played Arnolde in the 2012 Bell Shakespeare production of The School for Wives, alongside Harriet Dyer and Meyne Wyatt. The following year, he played Don Cotter in the soap opera Neighbours.

From April 2014, Adam appeared in a production of The King and I, his first musical theatre role. In 2016, Adam re-joined Home and Away in the recurring role of Atticus Decker.

== Filmography ==
Year	Title	Role	Notes
1975	The Olive Tree		TV movie
1988	A Waltz Through the Hills	Old Man	TV movie
1990	Home and Away	Dave Porter	Guest
1991	A Country Practice	Rick Morrison	2 episodes
1991; 1992	E Street	Rick Madden	2 episodes
1992	G.P.	Mr Sean Jones	1 episode
1993–1994	Home and Away	Luke Cunningham	Series regular
1997	Flipper	Nicholas 'Nick' Santoro	1 episode
1997	Water Rats	Michael Jeffries	Season 2, 7 episodes
1998	Cherish	First Man	Short film
1998	Chameleon	'Maddy' Madison	TV movie
1998	13 Gantry Row	Peter Carter	TV movie
1999–2000	All Saints	Dr. Tom Snowden	5 episodes
1999–2001	Farscape	Bekhesh	3 episodes
2000	Above the Law	Det. Sgt. John Morgan	5 episodes
2001	Beastmaster	Rolan	1 episode
2002	The Lost World	Cha-Zu	1 episode
2002	Farscape	Raa'Keel	Episode: "Lava's a Many Splendored Thing"
2002	Stingers	Gene Rubin	Episode: "A Girl's Best Friend"
2002	Bad Cop, Bad Cop	Tony Mahler	1 episode
2003	Farscape	Pennoch	Episode: "Bad Timing"
2003	Always Greener	Bryce Richards	Episode: "What a Difference a Year Makes"
2009	Underbelly: A Tale of Two Cities	Defence Lawyer	1 episode
2009–2011	City Homicide	Nick Buchanan	Main cast
2013	Neighbours	Don Cotter	Recurring
2014	Never Tear Us Apart: The Untold Story of INXS	Kel Hutchence	Miniseries, 2 episodes
2016	Home and Away	Atticus Decker	Recurring
2017	Hoges: The Paul Hogan Story		Miniseries, 1 episode
2017	House Husbands	Dr. Rayn Zanguard	Episode: #5.6
2017	Janet King	Simon Nixon	Season 3, 1 episode

== Theatre ==
Year	Title	Role	Notes
1974	The Servant of Two Masters		Playhouse, Perth with National Theatre
1975	Blithe Spirit		Hole in the Wall Theatre, Perth
1975	A Hard God		The Hole in the Wall Theatre with National Theatre
1976	The Rehearsal		The Hole in the Wall Theatre
1978	The Seagull		The Hole in the Wall Theatre
1989	Major Barbara & Joking Apart		NIDA Parade Theatre, Sydney
1990	Tom Jones		Bridge Theatre, Coniston with Theatre South
1991	Bloody Poetry		Crossroads Theatre, Sydney
1991	Iphigenia in Tauris		Woollahra Hotel, Sydney with The Lookout Theatre Club
1991	Just Bent		Wharf Theatre, Sydney with STC
1991–1992	The Merchant of Venice	Bassanio	Australian national tour with Bell Shakespeare
1991–1992	Hamlet	Fortinbras / Rosencrantz / Laertes	Australian national tour with Bell Shakespeare
1992	Richard III	Henry	Australian national tour with Bell Shakespeare
1995	Look Back in Anger	Jimmy Porter	Court Theatre, Christchurch
1996	Much Ado About Nothing	Claudio	Melbourne Athenaeum, Sydney Opera House, Canberra Theatre with Bell Shakespeare
1996	The Torrents	The Son	Playhouse, Adelaide with STCSA
1997	Theatresports Celebrity Challenge		Enmore Theatre, Sydney
1998	Fred	Detective Rose	Wharf Theatre with STC
1999	A Ship of Fools		Stables Theatre, Sydney with Griffin Theatre Company
1999	Macbeth		Sydney Opera House with STC
1999	Thunder Rock		STC
2001	Julius Caesar	Marcus Brutus	Australian national tour with Bell Shakespeare
2002	The Virgin Mim	Jeremy Swain	Wharf Theatre with STC
2002	The Glass Menagerie	Jim	Wharf Theatre with STC
2005–2006	The Give and Take	Jim	Sydney Opera House, Playhouse, Melbourne with STC
2006	The Peach Season	Joe	Stables Theatre with Griffin Theatre Company
2006	Speedy Mustard		Stables Theatre with The Hub Project
2008	Frost/Nixon	David Frost	Fairfax Studio, Melbourne with MTC
2010	Dead Man's Cell Phone	Gordon	Southbank Theatre, Melbourne with MTC
2011	'Tis Pity She's a Whore	Soranzo	Malthouse Theatre, Melbourne
2011	Hamlet	Claudius	Southbank Theatre with MTC
2011	Day One. A Hotel, Evening	Tom	Red Stitch Actors Theatre, Melbourne
2012	The School for Wives	Arnolde	Australian national tour Bell Shakespeare
2013	The Noahs	Voiceover Artist	Irene Mitchell Studio, Melbourne with Rollercoaster Theatre Company
2014	The King and I	Edward Ramsey / Captain Orton	Lyric Theatre, Brisbane, Princess Theatre, Melbourne, Sydney Opera House
2024	The Inheritance	Henry Wilcox	Seymour Centre, Sydney

== Awards and nominations ==
Year	Work	Award	Category	Result
2009	Frost/Nixon	Green Room Award		Nominated
2012	The School for Wives	Sydney Theatre Award	Best Actor in a Leading Role in a Mainstage Production	Nominated
