= Lisa Lackey =

Australian actress

- Born: Elizabeth Lackey; 2 March 1971 (age 55); Sydney, Australia
- Other name: Lisa Lackey
- Years active: 1992-2011

Elizabeth Lackey (born 2 March 1971), is an Australian actress sometimes credited under the name Lisa Lackey.

== Career ==
Lackey grew up in Orange, New South Wales, and attended Orange High School. Lackey was working as a model before she was cast for the part of "Foxy" Roxy Miller on the Australian soap opera Home and Away in 1992. She left the show in 1995.

In 1997, Lackey appeared in The Pretender, in which she played the role of Cindy Thomas, a photo model harassed by a stalker. In 2001, Lackey appeared in David Lynch's film Mulholland Dr., in which she played the role of Carol, a singer auditioning with Adam Kesher for the part eventually given to Camilla Rhodes. In 2001 she also had a recurring role on the series Rude Awakening. She also was in New Alcatraz in 2002. She portrayed Janice Parkman on the NBC television series Heroes between 2006 and 2010. In 2006 Lackey played the role of the angel Verchiel on ABC Family's Fallen miniseries. Her other roles include the lead in the TV series Just Cause and a supporting role in the final season of NYPD Blue.

== Filmography ==
=== Film ===
Year	Title	Role	Notes
1999	Love Happens	George	
2001	Mulholland Drive	Carol	
2001	New Alcatraz	Dr. Jessica Platt-Trenton	
2003	The Extreme Team	Palmer	
2005	Kicking & Screaming	Beantown customer	
2007	The Last Sin Eater	Fia Forbes	
2008	Shattered!	Victoria Kent	
2010	Grace Bedell	Amanda Bedell	Short

=== Television ===
Year	Title	Role	Notes
1992–95	Home and Away	Roxanne 'Roxy' Miller	Regular role
1995–97	Spellbinder	Gina	"Breakout", "Reunions", "Alien Invasion"
1995–96	Flipper	Alexis	Regular role
1996	Cody: Fall from Grace	Chantelle	TV film
1997	The Pretender	Cindy Thomas	"Exposed"
1998	Silk Stalkings	Adel Moore	"Ramone, P.I."
2000	Sliders	Gwen	"Dust"
2000	Strong Medicine	Athena Kelinopoulos	"Brainchild"
2000–01	Rude Awakening	Raquel	Recurring role
2001	CSI: Crime Scene Investigation	Amanda Haynes	"Table Stakes"
2001	Murder, She Wrote: The Last Free Man	Mary Hobbs-Mercer	TV film
2002	Blood Crime	Jessica Pruitt	TV film
2002	John Doe	Jamie Avery	"Unaired Pilot"
2002–03	Just Cause	Alexandra DeMonacco	Main role
2003	L.A. County 187	Detective Anne Coates	TV film
2004	CSI: Miami	Debbie Morbach	"Complications"
2004	Cooking Lessons	Olivia	TV film
2004–05	NYPD Blue	Assistant District Attorney Lori Munson	Recurring role
2005	Medium	Kamala	"Suspicions and Certainties", "The Other Side of the Tracks"
2006	Crossing Jordan	Claire Payton	"Someone to Watch Over Me"
2006	Fallen	Verchiel	TV miniseries
2006	Vanished	Dr. Rachael Lawson	"The Black Box"
2006–10	Heroes	Janice Parkman	Recurring role
2008	Shark	Jennifer Randolph	"Partners in Crime"
2008	Bones	Veronica Landau	"The Man in the Outhouse"
2011	House	Janey Parker	"Parents"
