= Ailsa Stewart =

Fictional character from the Australian soap opera Home and Away

- Home and Away character
- Judy Nunn as Ailsa Stewart (2000)
- Portrayed by: Judy Nunn (1988–2003); Nancye Hayes (2000)
- Duration: 1988–2000, 2002–2003
- First appearance: 17 January 1988
- Last appearance: 13 February 2003
- Introduced by: Alan Bateman (1988); Julie McGuaran (2002)
In-universe information
- Other names: Ailsa Hogan
- Occupation: Owner of Hogan's General Store; Co-owner of The Bayside Diner
- Father: Harold O'Rourke
- Brothers: Tony O'Rourke
- Sisters: Bridget Jackson
- Husband: Alf Stewart (1988–2000)
- Sons: Duncan Stewart
- Daughters: Shauna Bradley
- Stepdaughters: Quinn Jackson; Roo Stewart
- Nephews: Troy Jackson; Justin Jackson
- Nieces: Emma Jackson

Ailsa Stewart (also Hogan) is a fictional character from the Australian television soap opera Home and Away, played by Judy Nunn. She made her first appearance during the pilot episode broadcast on 17 January 1988. Ailsa was married to Alf Stewart and had a son Duncan. When Nunn decided to leave to devote more time with her novels, she was one of only four original cast members. The role of Ailsa was briefly played by theatre star Nancye Hayes whilst Nunn was taking leave due to illness in 2000.

== Creation and casting ==
Bevan Lee, a screenwriter for the show named the character "Ailsa" after his friend the Australian actress, writer and director Ailsa Piper.

When Nunn fell ill, the producers temporarily cast well-known theatre performer Nancye Hayes.

== Development ==
Ailsa was paired with Alf Stewart (Ray Meagher) and the couple became engaged. During their engagement party, Alf's daughter Roo Stewart (Justine Clarke) announced that Ailsa had been imprisoned for manslaughter. Of the storyline, Nunn commented "Just when I thought I'd been playing this rather nice woman, I had to take a different approach when Ailsa's dark past was revealed." Author Andrew Mercado noted that long-hidden secrets like Ailsa's were a recurrent theme in Home and Away's early years.

After Ailsa's grocery store is burnt down, leading to the creation of The Diner when she went into business with Bobby Simpson (Nicolle Dickson). Ailsa later gave birth to a son, Duncan Stewart (Alanna Ellis), which led to the writers exploring the effects of post-natal depression. The storyline saw Ailsa almost smother Duncan with a pillow.

In June 2000, Robin Oliver of The Sydney Morning Herald reported on rumours that Nunn was leaving Home and Away. Speculation began when someone called into the Sydney radio station 2MMM's "Rumour Mill" segment to reveal that Ailsa would die in an upcoming storyline and that her house would be destroyed in a mudslide. Oliver commented that that with no such scene having been filmed "the rumour is either wrong or the source is very, very good." Seven Network's head of drama John Holmes refused to comment on the claim, but was admitted to being "curious" about the source.

== Storylines ==
Ailsa owns the local general store and befriends the Fletcher family when they arrive in Summer Bay. She has heart of gold and has caring nature and sees the good in Bobby Simpson (Nicolle Dickson). Alf Stewart (Ray Meagher) takes an interest in Ailsa and they soon become engaged. Alf's daughter Roo (Justine Clarke) takes a dislike to Ailsa and feels she is trying to replace her late mother, Martha (Alison Mulvaney), and has her aunt Morag Bellingham (Cornelia Frances), a lawyer, do a background check on Ailsa. Roo learns that Ailsa served time for murdering her abusive father but most of the bay side with Ailsa. Ailsa and Alf marry in a low-key ceremony and they later foster Bobby together. Alf is upset when he thinks that the only reason she married him was to give Bobby a home. After selling her store to Alf's sister Celia (Fiona Spence), she goes into partnership with Bobby in the Bayside Diner. Ailsa later discovers she is pregnant and gives birth to a son, Duncan (Alanna Ellis), in 1989. She suffers from post-natal depression shortly after Duncan's birth and attempts to smother him at one point. However, when Duncan is hospitalized due to an allergic reaction to an old christening gown, Ailsa finally bonds with the child.

Ailsa's niece Emma Jackson (Dannii Minogue) arrives in Summer Bay after attacking her stepfather for trying to sexually molest her. Ailsa and Alf clash over Emma staying and her constant mood swings. Emma's mother, Bridget (Paula Duncan), tries to get her to return home with her and Ailsa battles her but loses. However, Emma returns a fortnight later after realising her mother has not changed at all. Just before Emma leaves, Ailsa takes in her former cellmate Margot Dean's two teenage children: Blake (Les Hill) and Karen (Belinda Jarret) much to Alf's chagrin. However, Alf begins to form a bond with them. They also begin fostering Simon Fitzgerald (Richard Norton), Sarah Thompson (Laura Vasquez) and Curtis Reed (Shane Ammann) in the years that follow. Ailsa is devastated when Bobby dies.

Following a hold-up at the diner, Ailsa suffers a bout of depression and begins suffering hallucinations; in which she sees Bobby's ghost coming out of the fridge door. These visions are a result of expired anti-depressants from her post-natal period. Ailsa is later confronted by her brother, Tony O'Rourke (Daniel Roberts), who still harbours a grudge against her for killing their father. They eventually make their peace. Ailsa is later involved in a car accident with Duncan and ends up comatose as a result. The doctors consider switching off the machine but Duncan witnesses movements. Ailsa wakes up, but due to the brain damage she has suffered, her personality becomes cold and distant and she is resentful toward Alf for thinking of turning the machine off. Irene Roberts (Lynne McGranger) helps Ailsa get back to her old self.

Shauna Bradley (Kylie Watson) arrives in Summer Bay and learns that Ailsa is her biological mother. It is revealed that Ailsa was raped by a prison guard while incarcerated for her father's murder, resulting in Shauna's conception and her being subsequently adopted by the Bradley family. After a shaky start, Ailsa and Shauna soon bonded and developed a close mother-daughter relationship. When the diner burns down due to carelessness from Colleen Smart (Lyn Collingwood), Ailsa is saddened as it is her last link to Bobby. She and Alf then purchase a building for a new restaurant called The Beachside Diner. While moving boxes one day, Ailsa suffers a massive heart attack. Alf and Duncan try to help her but she dies. Ailsa is later cremated and her ashes are scattered by Alf into the ocean. Alf blames himself and Duncan becomes withdrawn. Two years later, Ailsa reappears as a vision to Alf while he is suffering from a brain tumour. Morag and Donald Fisher are concerned and try to confront Alf about it but due to visions of Ailsa egging him on, Alf injures them both on separate occasions. Following Alf's diagnosis, he refuses to have the tumour removed as he does not want to stop seeing visions of Ailsa. After he collapses on the beach, Ailsa shows Alf what Summer Bay would be like if he dies. Alf eventually has the tumour removed and the visions stop.

== Reception ==
Robin Oliver of The Sydney Morning Herald said Alf and Ailsa had an "enduring partnership" and were "the best backbone providers in the business". The character has been described as a "much-loved maternal disciplinarian" by Samela Harris of The Sunday Times. The episode dealing with the aftermath of Ailsa's breakdown following a robbery at the diner won the Australian Film Institute Award for "Best Television Episode" in 1995 and was given to Executive Producer John Holmes and Series Producer Russell Webb.

Following her exit, Darrin Farrant from The Age stated "it only happened last Friday, but Ailsa Stewart was such a doyenne of Summer Bay that her death was rendered instantly classic." After noting her various storylines, including her stint in jail, a coma, two breakdowns and being taken hostage, Farrant commented "Despite these travails, Ailsa has managed not only to run a business but to provide emotional succour to half the population of Summer Bay."

In 2018, writers for TV Week included Ailsa in their feature on the "Top 20 Home and Away characters of all time". They wrote, "Practical, caring and down-to-earth, Ailsa was always on hand to listen to other people's problems. On the surface, she appeared a model citizen, but Ailsa had a secret – she'd been jailed for murdering her abusive father. After surviving everything from a mudslide to an armed hold-up during her years in the Bay, Ailsa died of a heart attack."
