= Ross Newton =

Australian actor (born 1967)

- Born: 20 February 1967 (age 59); Melbourne, Victoria, Australia
- Occupation: Actor

Ross Newton (born 20 February 1967) is an Australian actor, best known for playing Greg Marshall in the television series Home and Away.

== Early life ==
Ross Newton was born and grew up in the Australian city of Melbourne. He first showed an interest in acting at the age of five, after watching the film The Wizard of Oz. By his teens, Newton knew he wanted a career in acting. In 1987, he began studying acting at the National Institute of Dramatic Art (NIDA) in Sydney, New South Wales. His parents, however, believed that acting would only be a mere hobby for their son.

== Career ==
By age fifteen, Newton began appearing in Melbourne-based theatre, film, TV productions and student graduate films.

In 1990, Newton joined the cast of the Nine Network soap opera Family and Friends, playing the role of construction worker Bartholomew Thomas Purvis (Thommo). Thommo was his first regular and prominent television role. In 1991, Newton played the role of John Harding in the Australian erotic thriller film Fatal Bond. He later played the role of Edward Adam Stuart Young (Easy) in the acclaimed Australian ABC television series, G.P..

The same year, he also joined the cast of the Seven Network soap opera Home and Away, playing the regular role of Greg Marshall. Newton originally signed a two-year contract with the series. During his time on the show, Newton created an iconic character and storyline together with Nicolle Dickson who played Bobby Simpson. After one year in the series, Newton believed his character was boring, so he convinced producers to give Greg a more exciting role by having him committing adultery. Newton decided to leave the role in 1993.

In 1994 and again in 1995, Newton joined other Australian actors in the British pantomime season.

In 2002, Newton appeared in the Australian-American science fiction television series, Farscape, playing the role of Sloggard. Newton was seen by casting directors for the role of Samwise Gamgee in The Lord of the Rings film franchise. He "worked hard" on the audition but ultimately lost out to Sean Astin.

== Personal life ==
Newton has been in a relationship with dressage rider and trainer, Lucas Hurps for almost 30 years. In 2019, he revealed that he had concealed his sexuality on the advice of a Home and Away producer who suggested that being honest could affect his acting career. Newton recalled that it was "really challenging" and had a "huge effect" on his personal life. He similarly told a reporter from The Daily Telegraph that he believed his sexuality had affected which acting roles he won.

Away from acting, Newton also works as a development manager in Advancement (fundraising office) for Western Sydney University, where he still works as of 2026.

== Filmography ==
=== Television ===
Year	Title	Role	Notes
1985	The Fast Lane	Robby Williams	Guest role
1986	Prime Time	Danny Eilwood	Guest role
1986	The Flying Doctors	Harry	Guest role
1986	My Brother Tom	Les Connor	Guest role
1986	The Great Bookie Robbery	Police officer	Guest role
1990	Rafferty's Rules	James	Guest role
1990	Skirts	Dipp	Guest role
1990	Family and Friends	Bartholomew Purvis (Thommo)	Regular role
1990–1991	G.P.	Easy	Guest role
1991–1993, 2000	Home and Away	Greg Marshall	Regular role
1992	Couchman over Australia	Self	Guest
1996–1997	Pacific Drive	Roger West	Recurring role
1999	All Saints	Dean Bledsoe	Guest role
2002	Farscape	Sloggard	Guest role
2002	Crash Palace	Charlie	Regular role
2004	The Crop	Cop	Guest role
2003; 2006	Comedy Inc	Various	Guest role
2010	Cops LAC	Lionel Tibbs	Guest role
2012	The Politically Incorrect Parenting Show	Office manager	Guest role

=== Film ===
Year	Title	Role	Notes
1991	Fatal Bond	John Harding	
2023	Winter Swim – Late for Love	The man	Short film
2025	Face the Music	Jason Duncan	Short film

=== Theatre ===
Year	Title	Role	Notes
1993; 1994	Beauty and the Beast	Philippe the Beast	King George's Hall, Blackburn
1992	A Manual Of Trench Warfare	Private Jack Marriott	Crossroads Theatre
1994; 1995	Cinderella	Buttons	Cambridge Corn Exchange
1999	The Information	Albie McRanald	Belvoir Street Theatre
1995	A Midsummer Night's Dream	Bottom	Heavenly Productions
2025	Father, Son	Joe Grossweiner	Short & Sweet Sydney Festival Pride Week
