= Matt Doran =

Australian actor (born 1976)

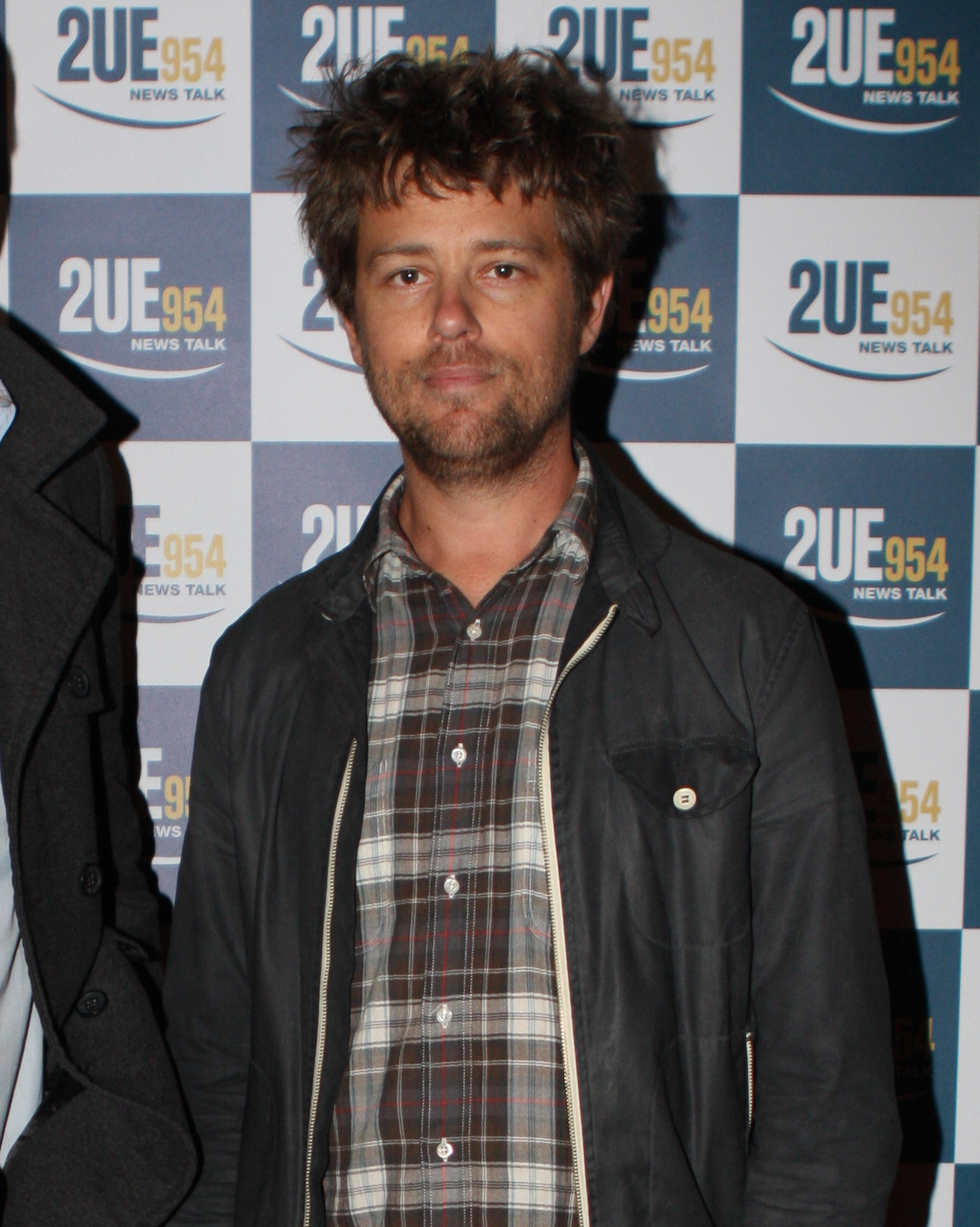
- Doran in 2011
- Born: Matthew James Doran; 30 March 1976 (age 50); Sydney, New South Wales, Australia
- Occupation: Actor
- Years active: 1991–present
- Known for: Home and Away as Damian Roberts (1991–1996); The Matrix as Mouse (1999); Star Wars: Episode II – Attack of the Clones as Elan Sleazebaggano (2002)
- Spouse: Teri McPhillips
- Children: 1

Matthew James Doran (born 30 March 1976) is an Australian television and film actor. He is perhaps best known for his roles as Damian Roberts in the Australian soap Home and Away from 1991 to 1996, "Mouse" in the 1999 film The Matrix, and "Elan Sleazebaggano" in the 2002 film Star Wars: Episode II – Attack of the Clones.

== Early life and education ==
Doran was born in Sydney. He is the brother of Mark Doran and uncle of JD and Max Doran. He studied acting for two years at the Australian Film and TV Academy and won an award for Best Performance and Most Improved Student before he graduated in 1991.

== Career ==
After graduation Doran landed a lead role in the film, Pirates Island, and made an appearance on E Street.

Doran played the part of the schoolboy Damian Roberts in the Australian soap, Home and Away, from 1991 to 1996. He guest starred in G.P., Fallen Angels, Water Rats, Medivac, Murder Call, Farscape and Stingers.

== Personal life ==
Matt is married to Teri McPhillips. They have one son together.

== Filmography ==
=== Television ===
| Year | Title | Role | Notes |
|---|---|---|---|
| | E Street | | TV series |
| 1991–96 | Home and Away | Damian Roberts | TV series, 426 episodes |
| 1996 | G.P. | Angus Ree | TV series, 1 episode |
| 1997 | Fallen Angels | Steve | TV series, 1 episode |
| 1997 | Water Rats | Bjørn Robinson | TV series |
| 1997 | Medivac | James 'Armalite'Dwyer | TV series, 1 episode |
| 1999 | Murder Call | Joel | TV series, 1 episode |
| 2000 | Stingers | Muddy | TV series, 1 episode |
| 2001 | Love is a Four Letter Word | Phil 'Klaus' Kaperberg | TV series, 26 episodes |
| 2001 | Farscape | Markir Tal | TV series, 1 episode |
| 2001–2002 | Always Greener | Scumbag | TV series, 7 episodes |
| 1998–2008 | All Saints | Phil Mawson / Toby Temple / Troy Lyneham | TV series, 4 episodes |
| 2011 | The Jesters | Alex | TV series, 2 episodes |
| 2013 | Redfern Now | Dean | TV series, 1 episode |
| 2016 | Rake | Grant Summons | TV series, 1 episode |
| 2017 | Doctor Doctor | Jack Howley | TV series, 1 episode |
| 2018 | Gods of Medicine | | TV series |
| 2018 | Total Control | Matthew, PBC Lawyer | TV series, 1 episode |
| 2023 | Aunty Donna's Coffee Cafe | Mouse | TV series |

=== Film ===
| Year | Title | Role | Notes |
|---|---|---|---|
| 1990 | Pirates Island | Grommet | TV movie |
| 1996 | Lilian's Story | Johnny | Feature film |
| 1998 | The Big Night Out | Gollie | |
| 1998 | The Thin Red Line | Private Orville Coombs | Feature film |
| 1999 | The Matrix | Mouse | Feature film |
| 2001 | Neophytes and Neon Lights | Sedge | Feature film |
| 2002 | Star Wars: Episode II – Attack of the Clones | Elan Sleazebaggano | Feature film |
| 2005 | The Great Raid | Ron Carlson | Feature film |
| 2006 | Macbeth | Malcolm | Feature film |
| 2007 | Edgar and Elizabeth | Edgar | Short film |
| 2008 | The Plex | AJ Stone | Feature film |
| 2009 | Persons of Interest | Oliver | Short film |
| 2010 | Transparency | Tom | Short film |
| 2011 | Next Door to the Velinskys | James Marshall | |
| 2011 | Found Footage | Darius | Feature film |
| 2012 | Great Western | Greg Grogan | Short film |
| 2012 | The Grand Design | Dexter | Short film |
| 2013 | Battle of the Damned | Reese | Feature film |
| 2013 | The Anti-Social Network | Pez | Short film |
| 2015 | Damage Control | Robin | Short film |
| 2017 | Trafficked | Gameboy | Feature film |
| 2019 | Danger Close: The Battle of Long Tan | Major Noel Ford | Feature film |
| 2019 | 17 Minutes | George | Short film |
| 2020 | Intersection | Jake Galloway | Feature film |
| 2022 | Interceptor | Chopper Captain | Feature film |
| 2023 | Chum | Jacob | Short film |
