= Nicolle Dickson =

Australian actress

- Born: 29 January 1969 (age 57); Sydney, New South Wales, Australia
- Occupation: Actress (former)
- Years active: 1987–2006
- Spouse: James Bell (1990–present)
- Children: 2

Nicolle Dickson (born 29 January 1969) is an Australian former actress, who was best known for playing the original character of teenage tearaway Bobby Simpson in soap opera Home and Away from 1988 to 1993. She left the acting profession and is now an accountant and bookkeeper.

== Biography ==
=== Early years ===
Nicolle Dickson was born on 29 January 1969 in Sydney, New South Wales and grew up in the suburb of Bass Hill with her family. As a child, she was a member of the children's theatre company 'Keane Kids'. Having achieved her Higher School Certificate at the end of 1986, Dickson enrolled at Sydney College of the Arts in Balmain (later to become part of the University of Sydney) to study a BA degree in Visual Arts, majoring in photography.

== Home and Away ==
In June 1987, whilst at university, Dickson auditioned for the role of Bobby Simpson for upcoming soap opera, Home and Away and appeared in the pilot episode broadcast on 17 January 1988. She won the "Logie Award for Most Popular New Talent" at the 1989 Logie Awards, being the first woman to do so in nearly a decade. Dickson left Home and Away in 1993 as her character was killed-off in a boating accident. In 1995, Dickson made a brief cameo appearance, in an iconic scene, where she emerges from Ailsa Stewart's (Judy Nunn) fridge door, as Ailsa is hallucinating. In 2018 she returned to the show, along with co-star Alex Papps, to celebrate the series' 30th year on air in a special documentary titled Endless Summer: 30 Years of Home and Away.

== Later career ==
In 1995, Dickson returned to Home and Away and filmed an episode of G.P., in which she played a violent young woman with learning difficulties. She filmed a guest appearance in Murder Call, in which she played a murdered reporter named Maddie Herman. Dickson then made a guest role in medical drama All Saints in April 2002 as difficult pregnant patient Penny. Since leaving Home and Away, she now resides in Southern Highlands, New South Wales and works for an accountancy firm.

In 2006, Dickson appeared on a Home and Away reunion for the flashback show, Where Are They Now?. In the same year, she appeared on Channel 7's Australian Celebrity Survivor, filmed in Vanuatu, becoming the fourth-last contestant voted out.

== Filmography ==
Year	Title	Role	Notes
Film and television
1988–93; 95	Home and Away	Bobby Simpson	Seasons 1–6 (main), Season 8 (cameo) (935 episodes)
1994–95	G.P.	Vicki Dugan	Seasons 6–7 (guest) (2 episodes)
1997	Murder Call	Maddie Herman	Season 1 (guest) (episode 6: Hot Shots)
2002	All Saints	Penny Hargreaves	Season 5 (guest) (1 episode)
2006	Wishbone	Agnes Kelly	Feature film
Self-appearances
1994	Kilroy	Herself	Episode: "Kilroy Down Under"
2002	The Best of Aussie Drama	Herself	TV documentary
2002	The Best of Aussie Cop Shows	Herself	TV documentary
2006	Where Are They Now?	Herself	TV documentary (featuring Home and Away)
2006	Australian Survivor	Herself	Season 2 (known as "Celebrity Survivor")
2018	Endless Summer: 30 Years of Home and Away	Herself	TV documentary
