= List of Home and Away characters =

Home and Away is an Australian television soap opera that has been broadcast on Channel Seven since 1988. This list documents the current cast of actors and characters, both regular and recurring, as well as debuting, returning and departing cast members. It is organised in order of the character's first on-screen appearance. If a character has been portrayed by different actors, the most recent portrayer is listed last. It is followed by an alphabetical list of all former characters that have been credited as regulars, with the actors who played them. The durations indicate that the character made at least one appearance in every year in that period, not necessarily that they were a regular character throughout.

== Present characters ==
=== Regular characters ===
Character	Actor(s)	Duration	Ref(s)
Alf Stewart	Ray Meagher	1988–	
Roo Stewart	Justine Clarke	1988–1989, 2010–	
Roo Stewart	Georgie Parker	1988–1989, 2010–	
Marilyn Chambers	Emily Symons	1989–1992, 1995–1999, 2001, 2010–	
Leah Patterson	Ada Nicodemou	2000–	
John Palmer	Shane Withington	2009–	
Justin Morgan	James Stewart	2016–	
Mackenzie Booth	Emily Weir	2019–	
Tane Parata	Ethan Browne	2020–	
Cash Newman	Nicholas Cartwright	2021–	
Remi Carter	Adam Rowland	2022–	
Eden Fowler	Stephanie Panozzo	2022–	
Mali Hudson	Kyle Shilling	2023–	
Levi Fowler	Tristan Gorey	2023–	
Abigail Fowler	Hailey Pinto	2024–	
Sonny Baldwin	Ryan Bown	2025–	
Lacey Miller	Sophea Pennington	2025–	
David Langham	Jeremy Lindsay Taylor	2025–	
Jo Langham	Maddison Brown	2025–	
Richie Brezniak	Rocco Forrester-Sach	2026–	
Amelia Carlisle	Nicole da Silva	2026–	

=== Recurring and guest characters ===
Character	Actor(s)	Duration	Ref(s)
Paramedic Jo	Katie Horky	2021–	
Gary Morrow	Peter Phelps	2022–	
Jimmy Fowler	Aaron Jeffery	2024–	
Debra Fowler	Tammy MacIntosh	2025–	
Constable Bowman	Nick Drummond	2025–	
Archie	Various	2025–	
Dylan Baldwin	Noah D'Annunzio	2026–	
Phillip Osmond	Michael Sheasby	2026–	
Courtney Radcliffe	Olivia Sawyer	2026–	

== Cast changes ==
=== Upcoming and returning characters ===
Character	Actor	Debut/return date	Ref(s)
Imogen Fowler	Georgia Blizzard	2027	

== Former characters ==
=== A ===
Character	Actor(s)	Duration	Ref(s)
Judith Ackroyd	Anna Hruby	1999–2000	
Charlotte Adams	Stephanie Chaves-Jacobsen	2001–2002	
Chloe Anderson	Sam Barrett	2021–2022	
Mia Anderson	Anna Samson	2021–2022	
Tasha Andrews	Isabel Lucas	2003–2006	
Kirby Aramoana	Angelina Thomson	2022–2025	
Brad Armstrong	Chris Sadrinna	2006–2007	
Rachel Armstrong	Amy Mathews	2006–2010	
Billie Ashford	Tessa de Josselin	2015–2017	
Martin Ashford	George Mason	2014–2018	
Ben Astoni	Rohan Nichol	2017–2020	
Coco Astoni	Anna Cocquerel	2017–2019	
Maggie Astoni	Kestie Morassi	2017–2020	
Ziggy Astoni	Sophie Dillman	2017–2023, 2025	
Gina Austin	Sonia Todd	2009–2013	
Hugo Austin	Bernard Curry	2009–2010	
Xavier Austin	David Jones-Roberts	2008–2013	

=== B ===
Character	Actor(s)	Duration	Ref(s)
Dan Baker	Tim Campbell	2004–2007	
Peter Baker	Nicholas Bishop	2004–2007	
Andy Barrett	Tai Hara	2013–2016	
Josh Barrett	Jackson Gallagher	2013–2016	
Morag Bellingham	Cornelia Frances	1988–1989, 1993, 2001–2009, 2011–2013, 2016–2017	
Alex Bennett	Nick Freedman	1995–1996	
Logan Bennett	Harley Bonner	2021–2022	
Sasha Bezmel	Demi Harman	2011–2015	
Donna Bishop	Nicola Quilter	1994–1995	
Shauna Bradley	Kylie Watson	1999–2002	
Casey Braxton	Lincoln Younes	2011–2014	
Darryl Braxton	Stephen Peacocke	2011–2016, 2026	
Heath Braxton	Dan Ewing	2011–2014, 2016–2017, 2021	
Kyle Braxton	Nic Westaway	2012–2016	
Tiegan Brook	Sally Marrett	1997–1999	
Charlie Buckton	Esther Anderson	2008–2013	
Ruby Buckton	Rebecca Breeds	2008–2012	

=== C ===
Character	Actor(s)	Duration	Ref(s)
Adam Cameron	Mat Stevenson	1989–1994, 1999	
Bree Cameron	Juliet Godwin	2022–2025	
Annie Campbell	Charlotte Best	2007–2010	
Geoff Campbell	Lincoln Lewis	2007–2010	
Kat Chapman	Pia Miller	2015–2018	
Selina Cook	Tempany Deckert	1994–1998	
Selina Cook	Louise Crawford	1996	
Nate Cooper	Kyle Pryor	2013–2017	
Miles Copeland	Josh Quong Tart	2007–2011	
Lucinda Croft	Dee Smart	1991–1992	
Luke Cunningham	John Adam	1993–1994	
Drew Curtis	Bobby Morley	2006–2008	

=== D ===
Character	Actor(s)	Duration	Ref(s)
Ric Dalby	Mark Furze	2004–2008	
Lynn Davenport	Helena Bozich	1988	
Natalie Davison	Catherine Mack	2012–2013	
Blake Dean	Les Hill	1990–1993, 2002–2003, 2005	
Karen Dean	Belinda Jarrett	1990–1991, 1993	
Jasmine Delaney	Sam Frost	2017–2022	
Rose Delaney	Kirsty Marillier	2022–2025	
Xander Delaney	Luke Van Os	2022–2024	
Martin Dibble	Craig Thompson	1988–1990, 2000, 2002	
Edward Dunglass	Stephen James King	1999–2000	

=== F ===
Character	Actor(s)	Duration	Ref(s)
Jai Fernandez	Jordan Rodrigues	2008–2009	
Donald Fisher	Norman Coburn	1988–2005, 2007	
Simon Fitzgerald	Richard Norton	1991–1992	
Sally Fletcher	Kate Ritchie	1988–2008, 2013	
Tom Fletcher	Roger Oakley	1988–1990, 2008	
Nicole Franklin	Tessa James	2008–2011	
James Fraser	Sam Meikle	1997	
James Fraser	Michael Piccirilli	1998–2000, 2005	
Lachlan Fraser	Richard Grieve	1997–1998	
Olivia Fraser Richards	Various actors	1998–1999	
Olivia Fraser Richards	Ivy Latimer	2005	
Olivia Fraser Richards	Raechelle Banno	2015–2018	

=== G ===
Character	Actor(s)	Duration	Ref(s)
Christian Green	Ditch Davey	2020–2021	

=== H ===
Character	Actor(s)	Duration	Ref(s)
Brodie Hanson	Susie Rugg	2000–2002, 2004	
Chris Harrington	Johnny Ruffo	2013–2016	
Spencer Harrington	Andrew Morley	2013–2015	
Roman Harris	Conrad Coleby	2007–2009	
Willow Harris	Sarah Roberts	2017–2021	
Jack Holden	Paul O’Brien	2005–2009	
Lucas Holden	Rhys Wakefield	2005–2008	
Tony Holden	Jon Sivewright	2005–2010	
Beth Hunter	Clarissa House	2003–2007	
Henry Hunter	Tobi Atkins	2004–2005	
Kit Hunter	Amy Mizzi	2003–2007	
Matilda Hunter	Indiana Evans	2004–2008	
Robbie Hunter	Jason Smith	2003–2006	
Scott Hunter	Kip Gamblin	2003–2005	
Barry Hyde	Ivar Kants	2004–2006	
Kim Hyde	Chris Hemsworth	2004–2007	

=== J ===
Character	Actor(s)	Duration	Ref(s)
Emma Jackson	Dannii Minogue	1989–1990	
Ryder Jackson	Lukas Radovich	2017–2022	
Peta Janossi	Aleetza Wood	1999–2000	
Aden Jefferies	Todd Lasance	2005, 2007–2010	
Elijah Johnson	Jay Laga'aia	2010–2012	

=== K ===
Character	Actor(s)	Duration	Ref(s)
Hunter King	Scott Lee	2015–2018	
Tamara Kingsley	Kelly Paterniti	2012–2014	

=== L ===
Character	Actor(s)	Duration	Ref(s)
Jude Lawson	Ben Steel	2000–2002	
Noah Lawson	Beau Brady	2000–2004	
Ben Lucini	Julian McMahon	1990–1991	
Carly Lucini	Sharyn Hodgson	1988–1991, 1997, 2000–2002, 2008	

=== M ===
Character	Actor(s)	Duration	Ref(s)
Evelyn MacGuire	Philippa Northeast	2013–2017	
Oscar MacGuire	Jake Speer	2013–2016	
Zac MacGuire	Charlie Clausen	2013–2017	
Martha MacKenzie	Burcin Kapkin	1988	
Martha MacKenzie	Jodi Gordon	2005–2010	
Greg Marshall	Ross Newton	1991–1993, 2000	
Sam Marshall	Ryan Clark	1991–2002, 2005	
Dana Matheson	Ally Harris	2023–2026	
Harper Matheson	Jessica Redmayne	2023–2026	
Steven Matheson	Adam Willits	1988–1991, 1995–1998, 2000, 2002–2003, 2008	
Stephanie Mboto	Fleur Beaupert	1996–1997	
Mitch McColl	Cameron Welsh	1999–2001, 2005	
Mitch McColl	Mitchell McMahon	2000	
Jesse McGregor	Ben Unwin	1996–2000, 2002–2005	
Floss McPhee	Sheila Kennelly	1988–1989, 2000, 2002, 2004, 2008	
Neville McPhee	Frank Lloyd	1988–1989	
Denny Miller	Jessica Grace Smith	2014–2015	
Roxy Miller	Lisa Lackey	1992–1995	
Seb Miller	Mitch Firth	2001–2004	
Casey Mitchell	Rebecca Croft	1996–1997	
Grant Mitchell	Craig McLachlan	1990–1991	
Brody Morgan	Jackson Heywood	2016–2019	
Frank Morgan	Alex Papps	1988–1989, 1991–1992, 2000, 2002	
Mason Morgan	Orpheus Pledger	2016–2019	
Tori Morgan	Penny McNamee	2016–2021, 2024	
Raffy Morrison	Olivia Deeble	2016–2019	
Liam Murphy	Axle Whitehead	2009–2013	

=== N ===
Character	Actor(s)	Duration	Ref(s)
Gypsy Nash	Kimberley Cooper	1998–2002, 2011	
Joel Nash	David Woodley	1998–2000	
Natalie Nash	Angelica la Bozzetta	1998	
Natalie Nash	Antoinette Byron	1999–2000	
Rebecca Nash	Jane Hall	1989	
Rebecca Nash	Danielle Carter	1994	
Rebecca Nash	Belinda Emmett	1996–1999	
Rebecca Nash	Megan Connolly	1998	
Tom Nash	Graeme Squires	1998–2001	
Travis Nash	Nic Testoni	1995–1999	
Felicity Newman	Jacqui Purvis	2021–2024	
Viv Newton	Mouche Phillips	1989–1990	
Phoebe Nicholson	Isabella Giovinazzo	2013–2017	
Bella Nixon	Courtney Miller	2018–2023	

=== O ===
Character	Actor(s)	Duration	Ref(s)
Tug O'Neale	Tristan Bancks	1992–1994	
Maddy Osborne	Kassandra Clementi	2013–2016	

=== P ===
Character	Actor(s)	Duration	Ref(s)
Matt Page	Alec Snow	2013–2017	
Jett Palmer	Will McDonald	2012–2015, 2017, 2019	
Ari Parata	Rob Kipa-Williams	2019–2022	
Nikau Parata	Kawakawa Fox-Reo	2020–2023	
Angel Parrish	Melissa George	1993–1996	
Nick Parrish	Bruce Roberts	1991–1994	
Shane Parrish	Dieter Brummer	1992–1996	
Vinnie Patterson	Ryan Kwanten	1997–2002	
Vinnie Patterson	Uncredited	2004	
VJ Patterson	Various actors	2001–2006	
VJ Patterson	Cooper Scott	2006–2007	
VJ Patterson	Felix Dean	2007–2014	
VJ Patterson	Matt Little	2014–2018, 2024	
Skye Peters	Marlo Kelly	2015–2016	
Kane Phillips	Sam Atwell	2001–2005, 2008–2009	
Alex Poulos	Danny Raco	2001–2004, 2007	
Theo Poulos	Matt Evans	2021–2025	

=== R ===
Character	Actor(s)	Duration	Ref(s)
Joey Rainbow	Alex O'Han	1996–1999	
Curtis Reed	Shane Ammann	1994–1997	
Shannon Reed	Isla Fisher	1994–1997	
Harry Reynolds	Justin Melvey	1999–2001	
Chloe Richards	Kristy Wright	1995–1999, 2005	
Damian Roberts	Matt Doran	1991–1996	
Finlay Roberts	Tina Thomsen	1991–1994, 1996–1997	
Irene Roberts	Jacqy Phillips	1991–1992	
Irene Roberts	Lynne McGranger	1993–2025	
Angelo Rosetta	Luke Jacobz	2008–2011, 2020	
Haydn Ross	Andrew Hill	1990–1991, 1994, 1996	
Michael Ross	Dennis Coard	1990–1996	
Pippa Ross	Vanessa Downing	1988–1990	
Pippa Ross	Debra Lawrance	1990–1998, 2000, 2002–2003, 2005–2009	
Josie Russell	Laurie Foell	2004–2005	
Harvey Ryan	Marcus Graham	2011–2014	

=== S ===
Character	Actor(s)	Duration	Ref(s)
Flynn Saunders	Martin Dingle-Wall	2001–2002	
Flynn Saunders	Joel McIlroy	2003–2006	
April Scott	Rhiannon Fish	2010–2013	
Bianca Scott	Lisa Gormley	2010–2014, 2016–2017	
Ricky Sharpe	Bonnie Sveen	2013–2016, 2026	
Robbo Shaw	Jake Ryan	2017–2020	
Bobby Simpson	Nicolle Dickson	1988–1993, 1995	
Sophie Simpson	Rebekah Elmaloglou	1990–1993, 2002–2003, 2005	
Colleen Smart	Lyn Collingwood	1988–1989, 1997, 1999–2013	
Lance Smart	Peter Vroom	1988–1990, 2000–2006	
Hayley Smith	Rebecca Cartwright	1998–2005	
Hayley Smith	Ella Scott Lynch	2005	
Ken Smith	Anthony Phelan	1999–2001, 2003–2004	
Nick Smith	Matt Juarez	1999	
Nick Smith	Chris Egan	2000–2003	
Romeo Smith	Luke Mitchell	2009–2013	
Will Smith	Zac Drayson	1998–2005, 2010–2011	
Scarlett Snow	Tania Nolan	2017	
Ailsa Stewart	Judy Nunn	1988–2000, 2002–2003	
Ailsa Stewart	Nancye Hayes	2000	
Celia Stewart	Fiona Spence	1988–1990, 2000, 2002, 2005, 2012–2013	
Duncan Stewart	Allanna Ellis	1989	
Duncan Stewart	Lewis Devaney	1990–1998	
Duncan Stewart	Brendan McKensy	1998–2001, 2004–2005	
Duncan Stewart	Benedict Wall	2016	
Rob Storey	Matthew Lilley	1994–1995	
Dani Sutherland	Tammin Sursok	2000–2004	
Jade Sutherland	Kate Garven	2000–2004	
Kirsty Sutherland	Christie Hayes	2000–2005, 2008–2009	
Max Sutherland	Sebastian Elmaloglou	2002–2004	
Rhys Sutherland	Michael Beckley	2000–2004	
Shelley Sutherland	Paula Forrest	2000–2004, 2009	

=== T ===
Character	Actor(s)	Duration	Ref(s)
Liam Tanner	Peter Scarf	1996–1997	
Belle Taylor	Jessica Tovey	2006–2009	
Dean Thompson	Patrick O'Connor	2018–2023, 2025	
Sarah Thompson	Laura Vasquez	1993–1995, 2005	
Colby Thorne	Tim Franklin	2018–2021	
Cassie Turner	Sharni Vinson	2005–2008	

=== V ===
Character	Actor(s)	Duration	Ref(s)
Amanda Vale	Holly Brisley	2005–2009	

=== W ===
Character	Actor(s)	Duration	Ref(s)
Dexter Walker	Tom Green	2009	
Dexter Walker	Charles Cottier	2010–2013	
Indigo Walker	Samara Weaving	2009–2013	
Sid Walker	Robert Mammone	2009–2013	
Kelly Watson	Katrina Hobbs	1995–1997	
Aaron Welles	Richie Gudgeon	1997–1999	
Justine Welles	Bree Desborough	1997–2000	
Josh West	Daniel Collopy	2001–2003, 2005–2006	
Hannah Wilson	Cassie Howarth	2013–2016	
Jack Wilson	Daniel Amalm	1994–1996, 2000	
Matt Wilson	Greg Benson	1988–1991, 2002	
