= Casey Mitchell =

Casey Mitchell may refer to:

- Casey Mitchell (Home and Away), a character on Home and Away
- Casey Mitchell (basketball) (born 1988), American basketball player

== See also ==
- KC Mitchell, American powerlifter and former soldier
