= Saul Bennett =

- Home and Away character
- Portrayed by: David Ritchie
- Duration: 1995–1997, 1999
- First appearance: 21 November 1995
- Last appearance: 23 February 1999
- Introduced by: John Holmes
In-universe information
- Civil partner: Melanie Rainbow
- Sons: Alex Bennett; Joey Rainbow

Saul Bennett is a fictional character from the Australian soap opera Home and Away played by David Ritchie. He made his first appearance on 21 November 1995.

== Character development ==
Saul is a leader of a religious cult and attempts to lure Selina Cook (Tempany Deckert) into joining the cause. He tells Selina that he wants to help the young people of Yabbie Creek who have lost their way in life and she accepts. But Saul has other plans for Selina. Deckert told a reporter from Inside Soap that "luckily, after only a short while, she realises that all the lines Saul's been feeding her are just lies, so that he can satisfy his filthy needs." However, when Saul's son Alex (Nick Freedman) and Irene Roberts (Lynne McGranger) express their concern, she refuses to listen and becomes "brainwashed" by Saul. The actress added that by telling everyone to leave her alone because she "knows what she is doing" - she ultimately "backed herself into a corner". Then Saul hits Selina and it changes the situation again. Deckert branded Saul a "real weirdo", but felt the storyline was realistic. She explained that many young people are just "looking for something and that's why they get caught up with these sort of things".

== Storylines ==
Saul first appears after Selina suffers a miscarriage and influences her with his spirituality and convinces her to join his commune. Saul later kidnaps Selina but is foiled by his son Alex and is later jailed. After being released from jail, Saul Kidnaps Selina again when she and his other son, Joey Rainbow (Alex O'Han) go looking for Irene's surrogate child, Paul at the commune. Saul attempts to murder Selina and himself by setting a room on fire. The whole place is set alight, Selina escapes after being rescued by Joey and Jesse McGregor (Ben Unwin) but Saul is presumed dead.

On Selina and Steven's wedding day, Saul, who has apparently managed to survive the fire kidnaps Selina, while posing as a chauffeur driving the bridal limousine. Saul hold Selina hostage in a remote hunting lodge in the bush but falls sick. The situation comes to an end when police surround the lodge and rescue Selina. Constable Terri Garner (Alison Standen) arrests Saul but when he reaches inside his pocket she shoots him dead. Saul briefly returns two years later as a ghostly vision on Joey's computer screen when he is suffering from Schizophrenia, instructing him to murder Irene but Joey relents.

== Reception ==
Of Saul, Tina Baker writing for Soaplife said, "Home and Away's cult leader Saul was nice Joey Rainbow's dad, but that didn't stop him from brainwashing his devotees, stealing Irene's baby, kidnapping Selina on her wedding day, and trying to force her to have his child...as you do." A columnist from Inside Soap said that Saul was "nuttier than a veggie roast" and cults and fires "go hand-in-hand" in soap operas. They opined Saul was no exception because he was a walking fire hazzard due to his "long white beard and flowing robes". They added that Saul looked just like Gandalf from The Lord of the Rings. Channel 5 viewers in the UK chose the episode in which Joey tries to save Saul following the commune fire as one of its favourite ever Home and Away episodes. A reporter from TV Week said that Saul was one of the show's "worst ever baddies" who had the "biggest death" of 1997. They said that Saul "upped his creepy factor" when he kidnapped Selina, adding that it was the "biggest shock" of 1996.
