= Rebecca Nash =

Fictional character from Home and Away

- Home and Away character
- Belinda Emmett as Rebecca (1997)
- Portrayed by: Jane Hall (1989); Danielle Carter (1994); Belinda Emmett (1996–1999); Megan Connolly (1998)
- Duration: 1989, 1994, 1996–1999
- First appearance: 3 April 1989
- Last appearance: 11 August 1999
- Introduced by: Des Monaghan (1989); Andrew Howie (1994); John Holmes (1996)
- Jane Hall as Rebecca (1989)
In-universe information
- Occupation: Teacher; Foster parent
- Father: Donald Fisher
- Mother: Barbara Stewart
- Stepmother: Marilyn Chambers
- Brothers: Alan Fisher
- Half-brothers: Byron Fisher
- Half-sisters: Bobby Marshall
- Husband: Travis Nash (1997–)
- Grandfathers: Gordon Stewart
- Grandmothers: Isobel DuPre; Sarah-Jane Stewart
- Uncles: Alf Stewart
- Aunts: Morag Bellingham; Celia Stewart; Colleen Smart
- Nephews: Seb Miller
- First cousins: Duncan Stewart; Lance Smart

Rebecca Nash (also Fisher) is a fictional character from the Australian television soap opera Home and Away. The character was played by actress Jane Hall in 1989, Danielle Carter in 1994, and Belinda Emmett from 1996 to 1999. Megan Connolly temporarily played the character in 1998, while Belinda Emmett received treatment for cancer.

== Development ==
Jane Hall moved to Sydney and began playing Rebecca when she was 18 years old. Rebecca is the daughter of school principal Donald Fisher (Norman Coburn). While staying in Summer Bay, she becomes a love interest for fellow teenager Steven Matheson (Adam Willits). Garry Shelley of TV Week said Rebecca was "a pretty girl, and Steven is instantly attracted to her." Willits explained that Rebecca has "problems right from the start" when she learns that Bobby Simpson (Nicolle Dickson) is actually her father's illegitimate daughter, which causes her to run away from home. As "chaos reigns" between the Fisher and Fletcher families, Steven goes looking for Rebecca and she is grateful for his support, which leads to a romantic relationship forming between the pair. Willits told Shelley that he and Hall had filmed some "interesting" kissing scenes as the beach, and he joked that it was "not at all unpleasant". The romance builds to "a crescendo" and ends when Rebecca leaves town. However, producers felt that Willits and Hall worked well together during the storyline and thought about bringing her character back periodically.

The character returned in 1994 with Danielle Carter in the role. Carter was only contracted for a seven week stint, but the storyline allowed for her to return in the future. Rebecca comes back to the Bay after making the decision not to become a concert pianist, much to her father's chagrin. Donald makes it clear that he is not happy about his daughter giving up on her music. Speaking to Inside Soap's Victoria Ross, Carter explained: "Donald is the one who has the real ambition for Rebecca to become a successful pianist. Rebecca's pretty intelligent and she's just as strong willed as her father so they don't get on that well – ironically really because they're so alike." Ross pointed out that with the recent death of Rebecca's sister Bobby, Donald should not be trying to push his daughter away. Carter agreed, saying that he had already lost a daughter and if he pressured Rebecca too much it could happen again. However, Donald still feels that Rebecca is wasting "the chance of a lifetime".

Rebecca's belief that there is more to life than the piano is reinforced when she meets high school teacher Luke Cunningham (John Adam). Carter told Ross that Rebecca thinks Luke is "really cute and she likes the fact that he's a musician too." She admitted that her character gets "a little bit obsessed" with Luke and starts talking about moving in with him. Meanwhile, Donald thinks Luke is yet another distraction from Rebecca's music. When Rebecca threatens to stay in the Bay to be with Luke, Donald tries to put a stop to the "blossoming relationship", but things are taken out of hands when Luke admits that he is not interested in Rebecca. Adam commented, "Fisher's got the wrong end of the stick! The situation between Luke and Rebecca was never what Fisher imagined. Luke didn't fall for Rebecca, he thought she was attractive, but if looks aren't backed up by a person you can get along with, you just get bored." Luke tries to let Rebecca down gently, but she loses her temper and throws a brick through his car window. Realising she cannot change Luke's mind, Rebecca packs up her belongings and returns to the city, leaving Donald to accuse Luke of robbing him of another daughter.

Producers reintroduced the character in 1996 and recast the part to Belinda Emmett, who admitted that she did not pay close attention to the fact she was third actress to play Rebecca. She stated "I didn't watch any old episodes or anything to see how the previous actresses had interpreted the role, I just played her my way." She watched her own work back and thought her portrayal of the character was a very different Rebecca. Emmett liked the way she played the character, but found that she was nothing like Rebecca in real life. Emmett called Rebecca "sophisticated and worldly", while she said she was "a great big old dag!" In 1998, Jason Herbison from Inside Soap reported that the show's producers planned on giving the character a "sleek new look". This required Emmett to spend longer in the make-up department as they straightened her naturally curly hair.

In late April 1998, Emmett had take time off from Home and Away after she was diagnosed with breast cancer and required surgery. Producer Russell Webb did not want Emmett to permanently leave the show and promised her that she could return when she wanted to. After talking things over with Emmett it was agreed that her role would be temporarily recast. Webb stated: "We will do whatever we can to support Belinda through this difficult time." Actress Megan Connolly took over the role of Rebecca, while Emmett received treatment. Emmett was forced to leave the role in 1999. She would not return to the show and died in 2006.

== Storylines ==
Rebecca arrives in Summer Bay in to visit her father Donald Fisher after being invited by Bobby Simpson. When Rebecca senses Donald and Bobby acting strangely, she feels as if they are talking about her behind her back. Lance Smart (Peter Vroom) and Martin Dibble (Craig Thomson), inadvertently let it slip to Rebecca that Bobby is, Donald's daughter and Rebecca's half-sister and cousin as a result of an affair he had with Rebecca's aunt Morag Bellingham (Cornelia Frances). Rebecca reacts badly to this news, running away, causing locals to think she has committed suicide when her bracelet is found on the beach. Lance and Martin look for her in the water but Rebecca is revealed to be alive and well hiding out in a caravan at the Caravan Park where Steven Matheson and his family, the Fletchers live. Rebecca then gives Lance and Martin a surprise when she appears in the water where they are searching for her. After Donald explains everything about Bobby and Morag, Rebecca stays in Summer Bay for the school holidays.

Rebecca and Steven begin dating much to the chagrin of Donald who feels that the relationship is a detriment to Rebecca's musical studies. Donald eventually relents and allowed Rebecca to attend a Summer Bay High school dance with Steven before leaving to return to school in the city.

Five years later, Rebecca returns and soon has her eye on local schoolteacher Luke Cunningham, who is employed by Donald. Donald tries everything to keep them apart, including giving Luke extra work at school. However, Luke soon breaks up with Rebecca of his own accord and receives a rock through the windscreen for his car for his trouble. Rebecca leaves soon after.

Rebecca returns to Summer Bay permanently two years later. She is stalked by Chloe Richards' (Kristy Wright) rapist Brad Cooper (Bruce Samazan) and loses her hearing after a prank played by Casey Mitchell (Rebecca Croft) goes awry. During this visit, Rebecca learns that Donald is engaged to Marilyn Chambers (Emily Symons), a woman nearly 30 years his junior. Rebecca is against the marriage, but after a confrontation with Marilyn she accepts her and attends the wedding.

Rebecca briefly dates Steven again, before falling hard for Travis Nash (Nic Testoni), whose girlfriend Kelly Watson (Katrina Hobbs) had left him and Summer Bay for the city. Rebecca and Travis marry in an intimate ceremony on the beach with Donald present as the celebrant.

Rebecca and Travis take over the tenancy on Summer Bay House and the Caravan Park when Pippa Ross (Debra Lawrance) moves to the Carrington Ranges with her fiancé Ian Routledge (Patrick Dickson). They also take on the care of Pippa's remaining foster children Sam Marshall (Ryan Clark), Tiegan Brook (Sally Marrett) and Justine Welles (Bree Desborough). Sam finds it hard to cope with Travis and Rebecca as his new foster parents and ends up living with Donald. Pippa's adoptive daughter, Sally Fletcher (Kate Ritchie) feels herself being squeezed out of her former home by the Nashes, luckily a solution is reached when she rents Travis' old place. The following year, Rebecca and Travis sail away from Summer Bay on a tall ship and set up home in Canada. It has since been mentioned in passing by Donald they have had a son, who has not been named.

== Reception ==
Emmett's portrayal of Rebecca earned her a nomination for the Logie Award for Most Popular New Talent in 1997. She received a nomination for Most Popular Actress in 1998. The following year, she was again nominated for Most Popular Actress, as well as the Gold Logie. Emmett was nominated for Best Newcomer at the 1997 Inside Soap Awards. Emmett and her co-star Nic Testoni won the Best Couple accolade in 1998, and were nominated again in the same category the following year.

In November 2021, three critics for The West Australian placed Rebecca at number 48 in their feature on the "Top 50 heroes we love and villains we hate" from Home and Away. Of Rebecca's history, they stated: "This character was played by two other people — one of whom was Frayed star Jane Hall — before Belinda Emmett made it her own. Rebecca was Donald Fisher's daughter — she eventually took over the caravan park with hubby Travis after Pippa left the Bay. Emmett left the show in 1999 after she was diagnosed with breast cancer — she sadly died in 2006."
