= Joey Rainbow =

- Home and Away character
- Portrayed by: Alex O'Han
- Duration: 1996–1999
- First appearance: 20 June 1996
- Last appearance: 11 May 1999
- Introduced by: John Holmes
In-universe information
- Occupation: Student at Summer Bay High; Beautician's assistant
- Father: Saul Bennett
- Mother: Melanie Rainbow
- Half-brothers: Alex Bennett

Joey Rainbow is a fictional character from the Australian soap opera Home and Away, played by Alex O'Han. He made his first screen appearance during the episode broadcast on 20 June 1996. O'Han joined the serial while he was still in high school and was assisted by an on-set tutor. His decision to quit the serial three years later was based on the decision to concentrate on his education. Joey departed on 11 May 1999.

Joey's storylines involve him leaving his mother Melanie Rainbow (Mercia Deane Johns) and father Saul Bennett's (David Ritchie) commune in order to learn more about the wider world and find acceptance in Summer Bay, gaining a new home with Irene Roberts (Lynne McGranger). He befriends Liam Tanner (Peter Scarf), Casey Mitchell (Rebecca Croft) and Stephanie Mboto (Fleur Beaupert). He tries to initiate a relationship with Casey but she rejects him. O'han described Joey as "naive and innocent", also "nerdy" and is better at winning school quizzes than female attention.

Later storylines see Joey begin a relationship with Tiegan Brook (Sally Marrett), work as a beautician's assistant for Marilyn Chambers (Emily Symons) and develop schizophrenia while taking his HSC. O'Han told the Sun-Herald, he found the storyline challenging and did some research into mental illness. He shortly became the face of SANE Australia's mental health campaign and the storyline was positively received, resulting in a 100% increase in phone calls to SANE's helpline advertised on the serial's official website.

== Casting ==
Joey was Alex O'Han's first major television role. He told an Inside Soap writer that he liked the idea of being another person and playing someone who was so different from himself. O'Han decided to maintain his education while appearing in the show, and received help from an on-set tutor. He was taken ill in late 1996 and had to have his appendix removed. While he returned to filming shortly after his operation, scripts still had to be rewritten.

O'Han decided to leave the serial in early 1999 in order to concentrate solely on his education. The actor told Jason Herbison from Inside Soap, "I had mixed emotions on the last day. It was hard having to say goodbye to all my friends in the cast and crew." O'Han made his final appearance as Joey in May 1999.

== Development ==
=== Characterisation ===
Joey has a similar introduction to many other teenage characters featured in the show. He arrives in Summer Bay to escape a troubled life. He starts school at Summer Bay High and Selina Roberts (Tempany Deckert) recognises him as the son of Saul Bennett (David Ritchie). Joey had previously lived in Saul's commune. A reporter from Inside Soap said that Joey had a past "more dramatic than most". They described him as "clever but shy" and took time to settle into life in Summer Bay. Joey finds a home with Irene Roberts (Lynne McGranger) and forms friendships with Casey Mitchell (Rebecca Croft), Stephanie Mboto (Fleur Beaupert) and Liam Tanner (Peter Scarf). He is "nerdy" and is better at winning school quizzes than female attention.

O'Han described Joey as a "very naive and innocent" character. He often felt sorry for Joey because he is an outsider who is unaware of teenage issues. Joey's upbringing in the commune had led to most of his problems. O'Han explained that the character "is just not into the concept of having an image and worrying about what to wear and how to be cool. It's not that I am obsessed by those things but he is not even aware that they can be important issues for teenagers." Joey becomes isolated after he gets tipsy at a party and embarrasses himself. He feels that he cannot face his friends, who are busy with their relationships, so he finds himself staying at home. Joey is pulled out of his isolation when his peers realise that he should be in the school quiz team.

=== Tiegan Brook ===
Joey's main relationship is with Tiegan Brook (Sally Marrett). As the show's official website described their relationship, it was "a sort of romance" with "ups and downs". The duo were sharing scenes since Tiegan's first day at Summer Bay High. He unsuccessfully attempted to keep her out of trouble. Joey then assumes the role of being the person who is always there to help her. Tiegan is sent away to live with another foster family, but upon her return she decides to pursue Joey. But Joey's friend Casey realises that she has feelings for Joey and this causes friction amongst the three characters. Marrett told Steven Murphy from Inside Soap that "Joey was the first person Tiegan wanted to see when she returned, she's pitched herself with Joey as he's always been there for her." Tiegan is sceptical about how other people view her and she and Joey enjoy their time together. But Casey soon becomes jealous and attempts to keep them apart. Marrett refused to reveal whether Casey would succeed but noted that Tiegan definitely wants a relationship with Joey. The only issue is that Tiegan does not know how to behave around those she loves and keeps her feelings hidden. Murphy concluded that Tiegan and Casey would feud over Joey.

=== Schizophrenia ===
While Joey is in his final year at school, he develops schizophrenia. Normally balanced, Joey begins acting strangely and knows that he is not feeling right. O'Han commented that while Joey does not think anything of it, the people around him become frightened by what is happening. Irene is the most concerned about Joey and is the first to realise that he is suffering from schizophrenia. Irene tries to help Joey, but he accuses her of trying to kill him and attacks her. O'Han explained that Joey is "very calm" about it and just walks out after as if nothing has happened. To him it is not a big deal, while everyone else thinks it is terrible. As soon as O'Han learned from the writers what was going to happen to his character, he began researching the illness and consulting the relevant organisations.

Joey smokes marijuana as a means to rid himself of the voices he hears. O'Han initially had reservations about the storyline. He explained "My main concern when I heard about (the storyline) was I wanted to do it accurately, I didn't want to insult people who have it, their families or the people who work with them and I think it's been done well according to the feedback. The storyline is also refreshing for me. It's a big challenge because it's so far from the norm in Summer Bay." He added "It's a very valid issue to take on especially for the younger (viewers) because schizophrenia affects them the most, We will reach a younger audience that wouldn't normally be reached like if the story was done as a documentary on television. Teenagers just wouldn't listen. With Home and Away it's much more palatable for the 16 to 25-year-olds. They're most susceptible and need to be educated about it."

In an interview with the serial's website O'Han mentioned how the storyline was his first on-going one "Although it's been going on for a long time and I haven't had a storyline that's lasted that long before, sort of a gradual build-up to the actual storyline then the denouement and the continuation of dealing with the illness. It's been a really good experience, though. He admitted he was unaware of the different types of schizophrenia and varying symptoms. "A lot of times when people hear the word "schizo" they think it's just someone who's mad or crazy. I found that when I was actually portraying it I learnt a lot more about it."

When asked about playing Joey at different stages of the illness, O'Han said: "The script was fairly specific on exactly how erratic his behaviour was to be at a certain moment, more or less the overall thing was decided in the script, it was just up to me basically how to… when it said Joey was getting upset, exactly how I'm showing that he's upset, obviously that was a decision that was made by the director and myself." He described the experience as "unusual" and no other the storyline would present him with a situation where he would portray different characteristics as opposed to Joey's normal demeanour. "So normally he's a very sweet, nice kind of guy, fairly straight, and all of a sudden he's smoking marijuana, so it was a big turnaround."

O'Han conceded that Joey would be one of the least likely characters on the show to use alcohol or other drugs. He added that this was the first time the serial had featured a character with a mental illness, saying that it was not brought to his attention until after he began shooting the storyline. He thought it was "great" to act out something that had not been tackled before, calling it "a new experience" for himself and the crew. O'Han worked on the storyline with the producers and the charity SANE. He became the face of SANE's campaign and was featured on posters and pamphlets. Minister for the Department of Health and Aged Care, Dr Michael Wooldridge said that SANE used Joey for "deliberate mass media focus" and a very public health campaign.

== Storylines ==
Joey arrives in Summer Bay after leaving a local commune. It is quickly revealed that he is the son of Saul, which terrifies Selina who Saul had previously kidnapped. Joey explains that he has left Saul's commune to seek life in the outside world. Selina talks to her guardian Irene and she agrees to foster Joey. Early into his stay in the Bay, Joey encounters problems; He struggles to adjust to meat and has an embarrassing episode where he runs into the Women's toilets in the Surf Club. Joey considers leaving town but Marilyn Chambers (Emily Symons) convinces him to stay. Joey clashes with Alex Bennett (Nick Freedman) over their differing attitudes toward Saul and soon discover they are half-brothers. They eventually put their differences aside and go camping together.

Joey enrols in school and is embarrassed when his last name is revealed to be Rainbow. He befriends Liam, who is wary of him at first. Casey catches Joey's eye but she rebuffs his advances and is only interested in Liam. The three of them begin hanging out together and find themselves in mortal danger one day when a shark attacks the boat they are in. Joey makes another friend in Stephanie when she joins their group. Stephanie later dies in a fall. Tiegan arrives in Summer Bay as Pippa Ross' (Debra Lawrence) newest foster child and Joey helps her with illiteracy; They grow closer but Tiegan is transferred to another family.

Irene's surrogate baby son, Paul is kidnapped by Wendy Bachelor whose husband served a prison term alongside Saul and Joey stages a plan in order to bring Paul back; He returns to the commune in attempt to fool Saul that he has returned home. The plan is almost successful until Saul figures out what Joey is up to and locks Joey, Casey and Liam in a shed and sets fire to the commune while holding Selina hostage. Jesse McGregor (Ben Unwin) assists with the rescue and everyone manages to escape but Saul is presumed to have burned to death; leaving Joey devastated. Paul is later found and later given to Irene's daughter Finlay (Tina Thomsen). Saul is later discovered to be alive and kidnaps Selina and is later killed when Constable Terri Garner (Alyson Standen) shoots him.

Casey begins to take an interest in Joey but he is only interested in Tiegan who has returned. There is constant friction in the relationship and Tiegan later joins Monkey Jam, a Rock Band with Aaron Welles (Ritchie Gudgeon) and she dumps Joey for the lead singer, Colt (Brendan Cowell). Around the time of the HSC, Joey's behaviour becomes strange and erratic and he has an outburst during an exam. Tiegan returns and tries to support him but he turns on her. Joey is persistently rude toward Will (Zac Drayson) and Hayley Smith (Bec Cartwright) and begins staying out all night and disappears for several days. He returns with Kaia Stokes (Blazey Best), a girl he met in the city. Joey's habits worsen as he gives Irene and Kaia a fright by standing on a cliff top claiming he is invincible.

Aaron returns and he and Joey go on a camping trip where Joey freaks out after smoking marijuana. Joey's behaviour reaches a climax when he sees a vision of Saul, who had died two years earlier, on his computer screen who tells him that Irene is against them. Joey then tries to smother a sleeping Irene with a pillow but is stopped by Chloe Richards (Kristy Wright) and James Fraser (Michael Picilliri). Joey then voluntarily admits himself to a mental hospital and is treated for schizophrenia. Following his recovery and release from hospital, Joey falls for Miranda Porter (Lauren Hewett). When Miranda panics after cutting herself while grating cheese during a meal, Joey is curious. Miranda tells him she is HIV positive and wants it kept secret they remain friends. Joey discovers he is eligible to attend university but decides to defer for a year travel around Australia giving talks on mental illness. Irene and his friends do not want him to leave but Joey's mind is made up and he bids Summer Bay farewell.

== Reception ==
Joey's schizophrenia storyline was positively received by critics and helped SANE Australia heighten awareness of mental illness. SANE, who had an input in the storyline, received a 100% increase in calls due to their telephone number being advertised on the Home and Away website. A writer for Inside Soap commended Home and Away for Joey's schizophrenia storyline, noting that the character's gradual breakdown had been "well-observed and sensitively handled." The writer continued "The show could easily have picked a more volatile character, but instead chose the intelligent, seemingly well-balanced Joey. They have remembered that schizophrenia is something that can happen to anyone." Channel 5 chose the episode in which Joey tries to save Saul following the commune fire as one of their favourite ever Home and Away episodes. A reporter from Soap Stars said that "pint sized Joey" transformed into a "babe magnet".
