= Barry Hyde =

Barry Hyde may refer to:

- Barry Hyde, vocalist and guitar player in the English band The Futureheads
- Barry Hyde (Home and Away), a character from the Australian soap opera Home and Away
