= The Zone (Australian TV program) =

- The Zone title card
- Genre: Video games
- Directed by: Nick Vale, Justin "Muttlee" Mansour
- Presented by: Adam Reilly; Justin "Muttlee" Mansour; Megan Connolly; Dave Kelly; Amos Wong; Stuart Clarke; Andrew Humphries; Richard Parnell; Nick Smith; Geoff Bartlett; Rod De Martin; Tim Smith; Jo Borkman; Janice Tong; Anthony Mansour
- Theme music composer: Disturbed Guys Productions
- Country of origin: Australia
- Original language: English
- No. of seasons: 1
- No. of episodes: 57

Production
- Producers: Nick Vale; Justin "Muttlee" Mansour; Dave Kelly
- Production location: Australia
- Editors: David Wood; Ross Wood
- Camera setup: David Wood
- Running time: 23 mins (approx.)
- Production company: Beyond Television Productions

Original release
- Network: Nine Network
- Release: 30 April 1994 – 1 July 1995

The Zone is an Australian video game focused television program that aired on the Nine Network on Saturday mornings at 8:30AM AEST from 30 April 1994 to 1 July 1995. The show was produced by Beyond Television Productions and was hosted for the majority of its run by Adam Reilly.

== Overview ==
The Zone took on a format similar to most magazine-style programs on television. The show generally opened with an introduction from Reilly of what would be on the show that week, followed by the latest gaming news, previews, reviews and other content such as TV show parodies or lessons in gamer jargon. The show also presented tips and cheats for current games, and held competitions for viewers. Sega Ozisoft was a major sponsor of the show, but the program covered games from several platforms popular at the time including the Super Nintendo, Sega Mega Drive, PC and arcade, as well as the 3DO.

The reviews and previews were typically presented by two people, many of whom were Sydney-based freelancers or worked on magazines such as Hyper and Gamestar. Despite being a contributor to a number of magazines, presenter Amos Wong drew the ire of many Nintendo Magazine System readers for reviewing games on Sega platforms on the show. Adam Reilly was originally brought in to do the music, but wound up being the host when a suitable candidate could not be found, and his screen test was well received. Reilly would later leave the show to pursue a music career; hosting duties would be later taken up by producer and presenter Justin "Muttlee" Mansour and actress Megan Connolly.

Each episode of the show was produced on Monday, before it aired on the following Saturday morning. Due to the show's 'G' rating and the early morning timeslot in which it aired, The Zone was unable to show gameplay footage of games with a rating higher than 'M', which many of the popular titles of the time such as Doom and Mortal Kombat II carried. Rather than simply not covering these titles, the on-screen talent of the show would act out gameplay sequences from these games instead. The Zone was notorious for its low budget; according to one member of the crew, the show was filmed in a disused storage room.

The show was cancelled in 1995, after just one year on air. The precise reasons for the cancellation of The Zone are not known. The final episode made fun of the fact that the show had gotten the axe; however two episodes remain unaired.

== Legacy ==
Due to the aged nature of the content, the potential rights issues concerning footage and the distinct lack of a market, it is unlikely that The Zone will ever see any sort of official release on DVD or other home video formats. However some dedicated fans and former crew have posted episodes of the show on YouTube, usually captured from VHS tapes that were used to record the show on their first airing.

== See also ==
- Good Game
