= Hyper (magazine) =

Australian video game magazine

- Hyper Issue 1 (December 1993)
- Categories: Video games
- Frequency: Monthly (1993–2014); Quarterly (2015–2019)
- Circulation: 17,000
- Publisher: nextmedia (1993–2018); Future (2018–2019)
- First issue: December 1993
- Final issue: August 2019
- Country: Australia
- Based in: Strawberry Hills, New South Wales
- ISSN: 1320-7458

Hyper was a multi-platform Australian video game magazine. It was Australia's longest running gaming magazine, published from 1993 to 2019.

In addition to coverage of current major video game systems and game releases (console and handheld), Hyper also covered arcade machines and classic games, as well as anime and DVD movies (once they became popular in Australia in '94 and '99 respectively) and also featured interviews with industry professionals and articles on game-related content such as game classifications (talking about G to X18+ about to be implemented in Issue #2), computer hardware and video game music.

Hyper also had a sister magazine, the completely PC gaming focused PC PowerPlay.

== History ==
Hyper was launched in 1993 by Next Media with Stuart Clarke as editor. Clarke had previously edited MegaZone; a then multi-platform magazine published by Sega Ozisoft, before it was taken over by Mason Stewart Publishing in September 1993 and started covering Sega games only. Clarke, who left MegaZone at the time of the Mason Stewart takeover, was asked by Next Media publisher Phil Keir to start a new multi-platform gaming magazine. Clarke recounted the events in Hyper's 100th issue in February 2002:

Just as I was starting to relax, Phil Keir, owner of Next Media and publisher of Rolling Stone, rang me at home one night to ask a few questions. Before I knew it he had asked me to set up a brand new games magazine – one that I created and controlled completely! So after a few nano-seconds of thought I said, 'Um, okay then'. One of the first decisions was to make it a true multi-format title, covering the best games on all platforms.

The launch issue of the magazine was created in two months with Clarke as editor, Andrew Humphreys as deputy editor, and Aaron Rogers as art director. Competitors of the magazine during its early years included ACP's Gamestar, Australian GamePro, and Clarke's former magazine MegaZone. Clarke and other Hyper contributors also appeared on the video game focused TV show The Zone between 1994 and 1995.

On 28 April 2010, Hyper released its 200th issue. Daniel Wilks was then editor until the 200th issue. He was succeeded by deputy editor Darren Wells. Stated Wilks on the longevity of the magazine:

I started on the magazine about six years ago, and during that time we had competition come and go, as well as all the horror stories and nay-saying that print was dead," says Wilks. "I'll admit there were a few times that I thought the end days may have been coming – especially during the peak of the GFC when every publishing company seemed to be shedding staff and magazines like it was going out of style, but I've always believed that the magazine could weather anything thrown at it. All of us who have worked on Hyper feel the same way. 200 is a pretty huge milestone for a magazine.

nextmedia announced in late 2014 that Hyper would become a quarterly publication from 2015 onwards. In 2018, nextmedia's computing titles, including Hyper, were sold to Future. That year, only two issues were published: issue 269 on 7 February 2018, and issue 270 on 8 August 2018, respectively.

On 11 August 2019, issue 271 was published by Future; the editor for this issue was David Hollingworth. No further issues were published by Future, and subscriptions to the magazine (both physical and digital) are no longer available.

Former editors Daniel Wilks and David Hollingworth discussed the magazine's decline and eventual closure in a two-part article published in 2021.

== Staff ==
=== Former editors ===
- Stuart Clarke (1993–1996)
- Dan Toose (1996–1999)
- Eliot Fish (1999–2004)
- Cam Shea (2005–2007)
- Daniel Wilks (2007–2010, 2013–2018)
- Anthony Fordham (2010)
- Dylan Burns (2010)
- David Wildgoose (2011–2013)

=== Former deputy editors ===
- Andrew Humphreys
- Ben Mansill
- Maurice Branscombe
- Darren Wells
