= Kit Hunter =

- Home and Away character
- Portrayed by: Amy Mizzi
- Duration: 2003–2007
- First appearance: 25 April 2003
- Last appearance: 3 July 2007
- Introduced by: Julie McGauran (2003–2006)
In-universe information
- Occupation: Student at Summer Bay High (2003); University Student
- Father: Jack Hunter
- Mother: Beth Hunter
- Stepfather: Rhys Sutherland
- Brothers: Scott Hunter; Robbie Hunter; Henry Hunter
- Sisters: Matilda Hunter
- Husband: Kim Hyde (2007–)
- Sons: Archie Hunter Hyde
- Grandfathers: Graham Walters
- Nephews: Noah Hunter
- Nieces: Ella Hunter

Katherine "Kit" Hunter is a fictional character from the Australian Channel Seven soap opera Home and Away, played by Amy Mizzi. Kit made her first on-screen appearance on 25 April 2003 and made her final appearance as a regular character in February 2004 but continued to reappear in a recurring capacity, making her final appearance on 3 July 2007. Kit's storylines have included battling alcoholism, falling for Noah Lawson, being stranded in the bush with Kim Hyde and subsequently falling pregnant with his baby.

== Casting ==
Isabel Lucas auditioned for the role of Kit, however, it was actress Amy Mizzi who was eventually cast.

== Storylines ==
Kit is the eldest daughter of Beth (Clarissa House) and Jack Hunter (Ian Lind) and the sister to Scott (Kip Gamblin), Robbie (Jason Smith), Henry (Tobi Atkins) and Matilda (Indiana Evans). Kit is first seen when she turns up drunk at the Sarah McKay drop-in centre. She steals Noah Lawson's (Beau Brady) motorcycle and nearly causes an accident when she rides towards a car carrying her mother, Beth and Rhys Sutherland (Michael Beckley). Beth and Kit's older brother, Scott take a hard line approach to her alcoholism and with Noah's help place her into a Tough Love rehabilitation programme which requires Kit to leave Summer Bay for a while.

When Kit returns, she begins to suffer a few wobbles. Local doctor Flynn Saunders (Joel McIlroy) tells her if she keeps drinking at the rate she does, she may be dead by the age of 21. Noah helps her again and Kit develops romantic feelings towards him but he does feel the same way about her. Kit returns to school to complete Year 12 and Irene Roberts (Lynne McGranger) becomes her mentor and takes her to Alcoholics Anonymous meetings to confront her problems. Irene lets Kit stay with her a while but throws her out after breaking her trust. Despite this, Kit manages to complete her HSC and attends the formal with Scott and they win the dance competition. The evening sours when Kit has her drink spiked in a mean-spirited prank by some fellow students. Noah is there to comfort her and they kiss. Kit soon leaves to attend university in the city. She makes several returns during the year for her other brother Robbie's 17th birthday and offers her stepsister Jade Sutherland (Kate Garven) the chance to come with her when she returns to the city. When Kit hears of Scott's alleged death at sea, Kit races back to the bay. Scott resurfaces alive and unscathed and she leaves again.

Kit grows closer to Kim Hyde (Chris Hemsworth) after several arguments and they begin a relationship, which upsets Matilda, who had since had a crush on Kim and assumed that she was the Hunter sister he was in love with. Kit leaves again and on her next visit she sees how badly Scott is taking his break up with Dani Sutherland (Tammin Sursok). She ends up going with Scott to Paris on a trip he'd originally organised with Dani, however she gets a job as a tour guide and stays there while Scott returns, upsetting Kim. When Kit does return to the bay to resume her relationship with Kim she is heartbroken to learn he is now seeing Hayley and is expecting a child with her. During this visit she finds herself at war with Amanda Vale (Holly Brisley) who is dating Scott and tries to alert him to the fact she is cheating on him but after a tussle with Amanda the evidence is lost. Amanda later spikes Kit’s drink which causes her to become drunk, leading Beth to think she is falling off the wagon, resulting in Kit being sent to rehab once more.

After the death of her grandfather Graham Walters (Doug Scroope) and more battles with Amanda, Kit, Robbie, Kim and several others are injured in an explosion at Jack Holden (Paul O'Brien) and Martha MacKenzie’s (Jodi Gordon) wedding. While being airlifted to a city hospital for treatment, the helicopter crashes leaving the party stranded. Kit sprains her ankle while searching for help in the bush and Kim stays with her while the others go to get help. Believing they may die before being rescued, Kit and Kim have sex. They are rescued and Kim's wife Rachel Armstrong (Amy Mathews) finds out about their fling but decides to forgive Kim. After Kit recovers, she goes back to the city.

Kit returns at Christmas visibly pregnant and tells Kim she is carrying his baby. Rachel agrees to support them but struggles. Animosity builds between Kit and Rachel to the point where during a major argument, Kit suffers a migraine and is driven to the hospital by Rachel. On the way they crash through some roadworks and end up perched on a cliff. Kim rescues them both but blames Rachel until Kit tells him not to blame Rachel. James Dalton (Gylton Grantley), Kit's ex-boyfriend from university arrives in the Bay and tells her he wants to be there for her and the baby and Kit gives him another chance. After Kim discovers a discarded marijuana joint, he realises James has been smoking it and confronts him. James promises to quit and Kit initially believes him. However, James is exposes as a liar and she throws him out. James takes this very badly and in a drug-addled rage holds Kit hostage. Kim and Rachel rescue her and James leaves.

Following several false alarms, Kit goes into labour for real and she and Kim head the hospital and suffer several flat tires, leaving them stranded. Kim is forced to act and as Kit gives birth he delivers their son, whom they name Archie. On the same day, they receive news that Beth has been killed in a car crash. Kit’s grief and struggle with being a new mother take their toll on her and she begins to rely on Kim more and more for support and her feelings for him resurface. Kit later admits to Matilda that she still loves him. Kit and Kim later kiss once more but Kim pulls away telling her he still loves Rachel. Kit hears of Kim and Rachel trying for their own child and decides to return to the city with Archie. Kim and Rachel's marriage becomes increasingly volatile and Kim later admits to Kit his feelings for her, but tells her he is unsure of them. Kit forces Kim to choose between her and Rachel. Kim’s failure to decide drives Kit to leave with Archie and she struggles, living in a run-down bedsit with an unreasonable landlord and a nuisance neighbour. Kim arrives in the city after leaving Rachel, following the revelation of her dalliance with Hugh Sullivan (Rodger Corser). Kit allows him to stay the night and in the morning forces him to decide once again and Kim chooses her. The couple then return to Summer Bay to say their goodbyes and then they leave for good.

== Reception ==
For her portrayal of Kit, Mizzi was nominated for the "Best New Female Talent" Logie Award in 2004.
