= Casey Mitchell (Home and Away) =

Fictional character

- Home and Away character
- Portrayed by: Rebecca Croft
- Duration: 1996–97
- First appearance: 10 July 1996
- Last appearance: 14 November 1997
- Introduced by: John Holmes
In-universe information
- Occupation: Student
- Father: Stuart Mitchell
- Mother: Margaret Mitchell

Casey Mitchell is a fictional character from the Australian Channel Seven soap opera Home and Away, played by Rebecca Croft. Casey made her first on-screen appearance on 10 July 1996 and departed on 14 November 1997.

Casey's storylines focus on the breakdown of her parents' marriage, her mother Margaret's (Robyn Gibbes) religious extremism and subsequent mental breakdown and her love of music. She makes friends with Liam Tanner (Peter Scarf), Joey Rainbow (Alex O'Han) and Stephanie Mboto (Fleur Beaupert). Casey's takes a romantic interest in Liam but he is in a relationship with Stephanie. She has a short relationship with Curtis Reed (Shane Ammann).

Her final stories see her reluctantly reconcile with her father, Stuart (Mark Lee) and fall out of favour with Donald Fisher (Norman Coburn) and her peers.

== Development ==
Casey is the daughter of Stuart (Mark Lee) and Margaret Mitchell (Robyn Gibbes). Stuart leaves the family and moves to the United States. This ruined their relationship because Casey believes that he has abandoned her. Margaret becomes convinced that Casey is possessed by the devil. Casey has an aggressive attitude that causes her burn bridges with her friends. But Donald Fisher (Norman Coburn) helps her and she settles at Summer Bay High. As a reporter from Inside Soap explained, Stuart is a conductor and he "immersed her in music" from a young age. Casey began playing the piano and became an accomplished pianist taking part in competitions. One such competition was used in a storyline in which Casey's talent begins to take over her life. Determined to win over her rival Judith Montgomery (Kimbali Harding), she becomes obsessed with practicing and experience nightmares, sleepless and stress. Donald warns Casey that hers practicing is ruining her academic studies. But Casey believes that losing the competition will ruin her dreams of becoming a professional pianist. They added that the story becomes more complicated when Stuart returns to support Casey, who does not want him around.

Aside from a relationship with Curtis Reed (Shane Ammann), which is ruined by the arrival of Jenna Evans (Claudia Buttazonni) – Casey's other romance stories have featured Liam Tanner (Peter Scarf) and Joey Rainbow (Alex O'Han). Casey, Liam and Joey are joined by Stephanie Mboto (Fleur Beaupert) forming a friendship group. She becomes romantically involved with Liam, when they save a wild dog she celebrates by kissing Liam. But when her attentions turn to Joey, his former love interest Tiegan Brook (Sally Marrett) returns to Summer Bay. The two females both decide they want to be with Joey. Casey becomes jealous of Tiegan spending time with Joey. Stephen Murphy from Inside Soap noted that they literally "sharpen their claws" and battle for Joey.

In July 1997, Jason Herbison from Inside Soap reported that Casey had been axed from the show. Croft's contract was due to expire in October 1997, but producers informed her that it would not be renewed. A spokesperson for the show stated "everyone will be really sorry to see Rebecca go, but it's just one of those things. The show's producers want to make way for some new people."

== Storylines ==
Casey is first seen alongside classmates Joey and Liam. Joey is attracted to Casey but she prefers Liam. Casey is quick to let Liam know she likes him but his girlfriend Stephanie returns to Summer Bay. However, the four of them soon become good friends. Casey's home life is turbulent as her father Stuart has walked out on her and her mother Margaret and she becomes increasingly unstable. Margaret is convinced Casey is dead and a demon has assumed her form. Stephanie persuades Travis Nash (Nic Testoni) and Kelly Watson (Katrina Hobbs) to let Casey move in with them. Casey tries to help her mother but Margaret and her friend George Neville (Craig Ashley) try to exorcise Casey by trying to get her to drink a strange liquid. Joey rescues her and she is grateful and kisses him. Stuart returns and Casey tries one final attempt to reconcile the family but Margaret suffers a complete breakdown in the diner and is committed as a result.

Casey forms a bond with her music teacher Rebecca Fisher (Belinda Emmett), despite the fact Rebecca previously had an affair with Stuart and partly contributed to Margaret's breakdown, and discovers realises Rebecca has feelings for Travis. Rebecca and Marilyn Fisher (Emily Symons) convince Donald to let Casey move in with them on a permanent basis. Donald's decision is influenced by Casey's skill on the piano but regrets his decision when she intentionally plays badly when she enters in the school concert. After seemingly placing a curse on Donald with Joey's help, he collapses, much to their shock. Casey later collapses too and it is soon revealed that Donald's ex-wife Barbara Stewart (Rona McLeod) is responsible for a murder attempt.

Casey dates Curtis and the pair frequently get into trouble. One occasion, Casey and Curtis are believed dead in an accident but they turn up at the diner alive and well and another couple who stole Curtis' motorcycle were killed. Jenna arrives in town and bears a strong resemblance to Curtis' late girlfriend Laura Bonnetti (also played by Buttazonni) who died two years earlier. Curtis dumps Casey and gets together with Jenna. On the rebound, Casey kisses Liam, who has recently split from Stephanie but it goes no further and Liam reconciles with Stephanie. Stephanie later dies after falling down a cliff while on a bushwalk and Liam and Casey grow closer. However, Liam leaves Summer bay with his mother Frances (Anne Grigg) to live in Peru leaving Casey devastated.

Tiegan arrives and makes her interest in Joey clear, Casey is jealous, despite rejecting him in the past. The girls fight and receive detention as a result. Casey then decides to step aside and let Joey and Tiegan be a couple. Aaron Welles (Ritchie Gudgeon) arrives and Casey begins dating him. Donald tries to evict Casey but Aaron's sister, Justine (Bree Desborough) tells her that he needs to give her two months' notice. She takes revenge on Donald by convincing him he is going senile by sabotaging the kitchen light but it backfires when Rebecca tries changing the bulb and falls hitting her head, leaving her temporarily deaf. Casey is horrified when Aaron buys a knife for protection, following a mugging. However, he gets rid of it.

Stuart returns and asks Casey to join him in New York and she accepts his offer. On her last day at school, she takes the blame for the class superglueing student teacher Brett Egan (Emmanuel Marshall) to his chair but Donald refuses to and gives the class a week's detention every time she tries to accept sole responsibility. He tells her she is getting her classmates a punishment and that no-one wants her there and orders her to leave the school immediately. Casey then leaves for America.

== Reception ==
Dave Lanning writing for The People said that Casey's exit was an "historic moment" because she lived in Summer Bay without having "a single bonk". He quipped that the character had set "a virgin record". A critic from Inside Soap magazine observed that "for all her ups and downs, there has always been one constant in her life - a true love for music."
