= Irene Roberts (Home and Away) =

Fictional character

- Home and Away character
- Lynne McGranger as Irene Roberts
- Portrayed by: Jacqy Phillips (1991–1992); Lynne McGranger (1993–2025)
- Duration: 1991–2025
- First appearance: 29 October 1991
- Last appearance: 19 August 2025
- Introduced by: Des Monaghan
- Book appearances: Home and Away: A Place in the Bay
- Spin-off appearances: Home and Away: An Eye for an Eye (2015); Home and Away: Revenge (2016); Home and Away: All or Nothing (2017)
In-universe information
- Occupation: Diner co-owner; Waitress; Barista; Foster parent; School secretary
- Sisters: Wendy McFarlane
- Husband: Murdoch Roberts (until 1995)
- Sons: Mick Jennings; Nathan Roberts; Damian Roberts
- Daughters: Finlay Roberts
- Grandsons: Paul Roberts; Mark Roberts
- Granddaughters: Luc Patterson
- Nephews: Nelson McFarlane

Irene Roberts is a fictional character from the Australian television soap opera Home and Away. She was originally played by actress Jacqy Phillips from her introduction on 29 October 1991, until 13 May 1992. Following Phillips' departure, the part was recast to Lynne McGranger, who debuted during the episode broadcast on 12 January 1993. Irene was initially a recurring character, but on 7 October 1993 McGranger was promoted to the regular cast. McGranger is the longest-serving female actor in an Australian drama and one of the longest-serving Home and Away cast members. On 23 February 2025, McGranger announced that she had quit the serial, having played Irene for just over 32 years. Her final appearance aired on 19 August 2025. That same year, she won the Gold Logie for her portrayal of Irene.

== Casting ==
Actress Jacqy Phillips was cast the role in 1991. Phillips was predominately a stage actress but enjoyed working on the show. She told Garry Shelley from TV Week that "I never dreamed I would ever work in a soap and I'm not being snobbish about it .... but now I'm thrilled; I love it." Phillips added that she had an "open-ended" contract with the show. The actress left the role in 1992.

Irene was later recast to Lynne McGranger, who took over the role at the end of the year. McGranger had worked mostly in the theatre and had little television experience before the role. The actress and her family relocated from Melbourne to Sydney to be closer to the studios. McGranger was originally contracted for a 13-week guest stint, but when she proved popular with viewers, she was brought back six months later. She was promoted to the main cast on 7 October 1993. Of her casting, McGranger said "I jumped at the chance of going into Home and Away. In Australia 90% of actors there are out of work, so to have two years guaranteed work is very exciting." McGranger is one of the longest serving cast members in the serial. Speaking of her duration whilst being interviewed by David Knox of TV Tonight, McGranger stated: "Being very pragmatic, I love my job. You couldn't be doing this for 18 years if you didn't love it. You would go stark raving nuts, because it is intense." McGranger later became the longest-serving female actor in an Australian drama serial.

== Development ==
Irene was initially portrayed as a hateful drunk and Irene's bad behaviour earned her negativity from viewers. In 1992, Phillips revealed that while out in public she had been approached by strangers who called her the "really rotten bitch from Home and Away".

The serial's official website describes Irene as: "your classic Aussie battler. Down to earth and with a wry sense of humour, she's always good for a yarn and a laugh. It doesn't matter who you are, young or old, Irene's door is always open to you." Irene is seen as a caring woman who constantly takes in children to foster, of this they say: "Helping kids in need has given her a second chance at being a mum, and the opportunity to make up for all the mistakes she made with her own kids."

There were plans to write the character out of Home And Away in early 2002, however when new Script Producer Coral Drouyn arrived, she was horrified and decided to give the character strong storylines and ground her.

McGranger said of her role, "Having to play that 'losing your mind' stuff was really a stretch for something like Home And Away, and for someone like Irene, who's very comfortably swanning around Summer Bay for 13 or 14 years, making people cups of tea and solving their problems...Sometimes you get a little too comfortable and that really jolted me out of my comfort zone. It was exhausting but exhilarating."

The character is known for her fostering role and has been seen as a mother figure by several young characters during her time in the show, including Selina Cook (Tempany Deckert), who had a relationship with Irene's son Damian Roberts (Matt Doran), Chloe Richards (Kristy Wright), Chloe's daughter Olivia Fraser Richards (Raechelle Banno), siblings Hayley (Bec Hewitt) and Nick Smith (Chris Egan), Sasha Bezmel (Demi Harman), Geoff (Lincoln Lewis) and Annie Campbell (Charlotte Best), Belle Taylor (Jessica Tovey), and Joey Rainbow (Alex O'Han).

Writers created a heart problem story for Irene which occurs after she suffers from stress. Irene endures a painkiller addiction, her relationship with Paris ends and she tries to cope with Tasha Andrews' (Isabel Lucas) wayward behaviour. Irene's health deteriorates when she tries to help fellow alcoholic Kit Hunter (Amy Mizzi) remain sober. Irene accompanies Kit to an Alcoholics Anonymous meeting and talks to the group about her own experiences. She then collapses with chest pains and is taken to hospital.

McGranger told a reporter from Inside Soap that Irene has "a wake up call" regarding her health. She explained that while Irene does not have a heart attack, her arteries are blocking in the first stages of heart disease. Irene takes her health scare seriously because of her past experiences with alcohol abuse. McGranger said that "being a recovering alcoholic, Irene has done a lot of damage to her body over the years, and she sees this as a warning of worse things to come."

But rather than it being dietary related, her heart problems are brought on by "a stressful run". Irene realises she needs to rest but McGranger thought Tasha's dramas would bring yet more strife. The actress enjoyed playing the story because it raised awareness that anyone can have heart problems. Irene is "a health nut" and likes to exercise often. McGranger concluded that "it shows the viewers that you can be fit and healthy, but if you let stress get on top of you, then this can happen. Any age, any time."

=== Departure ===
On 23 February 2025, McGranger announced that she was to leave the show in August after 32 years. Of her feelings towards her departure, she told Clare Rigden of The Sunday Times: "I'm excited, I'm a little bit sad, I'm anxious, but at the same time, I'm over the moon. It just feels like the time is right." McGranger made the decision to leave after appearing in a production of The Grandparents' Club in 2024. She felt that she had "come full circle" as she started her career in the theatre and wanted to end it there. She admitted the decision was "tough" and spoke about it with her family, co-stars and the show's producers, but did not ever think it was the wrong choice. McGranger came up with her character's exit storyline, which the head writer and producers loved, but refused to reveal the details. She called it "very pertinent, and very important".

Filming of McGranger's final scenes began during the week commencing 24 March and wrapped on 26 March. She shot her final scene on the Pier Diner set in the network's studio at Eveleigh, before Series Producer Lucy Addario gave her a bouquet of flowers and the hamburger phone from the set. Of wrapping her time on the show, McGranger stated "I've had the ride of my life. And I love each and every one of you so much: The cast – Ray, Georgie, Emily, Shane, Ada, James, all the youngins. The art department, the writers, everybody – there's so many unsung heroes. This show is made up of so many parts. You're all amazing, and it's been my great privilege to work with each and every one of you. I'm touched, I'm humbled and I'm so honoured. Thank you so much." McGranger's final episode was broadcast on 19 August 2025.

In the lead up to the character's departure from Summer Bay, she is diagnosed with Alzheimer's disease. McGranger came up with the idea, before taking it to the writers. She admitted that she would have been happy if Irene was "hit by a bus outside the Diner", but realised that exit would have been too simple and that the writers would not "just wave goodbye to Irene out the back of a bus!" McGranger said that Irene's diagnosis is "sad and final", but she uses her time the best that she can and her exit would be "a positive message for people." Ahead of her exit episode, Irene decides she wants to see the world while she still can and sells her house. Her friends decide to throw her a farewell party, with speeches and a music performance. However, her close friend John Palmer (Shane Withington) struggles with her imminent departure and contemplates not going to the party. McGranger found filming her exit scenes and saying goodbye to her colleagues "incredibly difficult but rich. Ada was sobbing and Shane, I think, is still in denial!" She also revealed that some of her former co-stars had been in contact to wish her well. She told Tamara Cullen of TV Week that the impact her character had had on people was "a huge honour and responsibility" and she was grateful for everyone.

== Storylines ==
Irene first shows up in Summer Bay as the alcoholic mother of three children, Nathan (David Dixon), Damian (Matt Doran) and "Fin" Finlay (Tina Thomsen), being fostered by Pippa Ross. Having hit rock bottom after an unhappy marriage, she had started drinking heavily as a coping mechanism, and it was soon revealed that she had used violence towards Damian and Nathan on occasions while under the influence. Although Damian and Fin try to maintain a relationship with her following her arrival, her drunken antics prove too much, and after falling down the stairs after a binge, she falsely accuses Damian and Fin of pushing her and then threatens to harm Pippa if she does not release Damian from her care. This proves to be the final straw for Damian and Fin; unable to cope with her behaviour any longer, the two, backed by Pippa and her husband Michael, tell Irene to leave the Bay and go home and get her life back together.

After an 18-month absence, Irene returns to the Bay after hearing in the news that Fin had nearly drowned during a deep sea dive. By this time, Irene had turned her life around and had not touched alcohol in over a year. Although initially sceptical, her children soon warmed to her when they realised that she really had changed for the better, and, following the arrival of Damian and Fin's brother Nathan in the Bay when Irene was considering leaving, Nathan explained that their mother was now recovered from alcoholism and had left their father; as a result, Damian and Fin decided that they wanted her to stay at Summer Bay permanently. Despite the previous animosity between the two, Irene also soon becomes firm friends with Pippa, displaying a kinder side to her personality when she helps Pippa come to terms with the loss of her son Dale who died of cot death, and the death of her husband Michael, who drowned in a flash flood.

Before long, Irene would become one of the key characters in the series, taking over the Beach House. Her three biological children moved back in with her, and she also fostered a number of other young people over time.

Irene and Angie Russell (Laurie Foell) took an instant dislike to each other. Angie tried getting Irene in trouble with the law by framing her for sexually interfering with Nick, but Irene threatened Angie and did some detective work before eventually learning that Angie and Nick had been having an affair themselves. Horrified, Irene assaulted Angie and did her best from then on to destroy her. After Angie's dodgy past was exposed, Irene attended Angie's walk of shame at the school. Irene, amongst several others, was a top suspect when Angie was found dead. But it eventually turned out that Dylan, Angie's son, had accidentally killed her during an argument. Not disappointed by Angie's death, Irene was later shocked when Angie's past came back to haunt her instead in the form of Tasha. Irene adopts homeless Tasha, but Angie's cousin, Josie Russell (Laurie Foell), turned up in town demanding legal custody of Tasha. Morag Bellingham (Cornelia Frances) assisted Irene in fighting Josie, who then backed off. Irene was later shocked when Josie revealed that Tasha's father had planted surveillance cameras in her house to spy over her and Irene. Morag managed to convince Irene to meet with Tasha's father, who then agreed to take the cameras away. In the end, Tasha stayed with Irene and Josie backed off once and for all.

Irene and several others fear for Tasha's safety when she joins a religious group called the Believers. They seem dodgy and Irene, not wanting to get involved, lets Tasha make her own decisions. But the leader, Mumma Rose (Linden Wilkinson), proved to be dangerous and Irene watched from afar as Tasha's life spiralled out of control. Irene and Summer Bay later reunited after Josh West (Daniel Collopy) turned up in town and became mayor, with the intention of starting developments and constructions in Summer Bay. In 2006, Irene was shocked when Josh was found dead and Tasha became a top suspect. Through a series of events, Tasha was proven innocent. Irene tried starting a relationship with Barry Hyde (Ivar Kants), but Morag later exposed him as Josh's killer and the killer of his own wife, Kerry. Irene couldn't believe Barry had murdered two people, and broke up with him. Irene was pleased, however, when Tasha saw sense and left the Believers after they tried to kill her.

Irene insisted to everyone that Will was innocent, but Morag made sure Irene knew she was going to do everything she could to destroy Will. Irene was later devastated when Will managed to escape town and she decided to track him down. Will eventually contacted Irene, who found him at an old barn miles away from town. Will then forced Irene to promise to let him go and told her to look after Lily. But realizing that Alf hadn't killed Penn, Irene contacted the police and Irene watched on as Will was arrested and charged for murdering Penn instead. Irene was then devastated when Lily blamed her for everything.

Irene is involved in the bomb explosion that occurs at the hospital. Irene is delivering food for Bianca Scott (Lisa Gormley) and Heath Braxton (Dan Ewing) before the explosion. The bomb explodes and Irene is slammed into one of the walls she was standing by. However, she survives the bombing. Chris Harrington (Johnny Ruffo) picked poisonous mushrooms and served them as his famous Mushroom Risotto, he managed to drive the diner temporarily out of business and Irene considering shutting the diner for good, but with help from the community the diner was saved. Chris and his brother Spencer (Andrew Morley) and Sasha Bezmel (Demi Harman) moved into the Beach House to live with Irene.

Irene farewells Spencer and Sasha after they leave town. Irene supports VJ Patterson (Matthew Little) and Zac MacGuire (Charlie Clausen) while Leah Patterson-Baker (Ada Nicodemou) is in a coma following a bus accident. Irene invites Nate Cooper (Kyle Pryor) to move into the Beach House with her. Principal Greg Snelgrove (Paul Gleeson) takes a liking to Irene and they have dinner together, but Irene is bored by Greg's conversation. Irene goes to London to help look after James Fraser's (Michael Piccirilli) niece Olivia Fraser Richards (Raechelle Banno). When Irene returns, she helps Marilyn with her memory loss. Olivia turns up in the Bay to live with Irene. She later reveals to Irene that she was sexually abused by a friend of her uncle's. This causes Irene to open up about her own abuse and she reveals that she had a child that she was forced to give up for adoption. Irene starts drinking again to cope with her grief. After Charlotte King (Erika Heynatz) is shot, Irene becomes a suspect. Irene decides to try to find her child. Irene also took John's foster daughter, Skye Peters (Marlo Kelly) in her care when John Palmer (Shane Withington) goes to see Marilyn in Italy. On the night of the hospital fundraiser party, Irene meets a mysterious man at her front door named Mick Jennings (Kristian Schmid), who claims to be Chris' uncle. When Irene becomes suspicious of who Mick really is, she tries to escape, but Mick kidnaps her. He holds her captive for weeks and uses her phone to reply to Olivia's text messages. He later sends her a photo of a captive and terrified Irene.

Irene welcomes a new housemate in Harper Matheson (Jessica Redmayne) and when she leaves to go see family, Harper hides her sister Dana Matheson (Ally Harris) in her room. When Irene returns, she realises Harper is hiding something and meets Dana, who is hiding from the police. The sisters explain that Dana is being framed by a corrupt detective and Irene chooses to keep her secret. After Dana is found, Irene is arrested by Rose Delaney (Kirsty Marillier) and charged with harboring a fugitive. She realises that her past criminal history means she could go to prison for around seven years. Harper and Dana support her, while John also stands by Irene. The prosecution state that Irene should have the maximum sentence applied to her, but after John tells her lawyer Greta (Amanda McGregor) to do something, Greta asks for a short recess as Irene would like to say something. Returning from the recess, Irene tells the court that she is not a bad person; she was helping out someone in a moment of need and does not regret a single moment of helping them. The judge decides to drop the charges against Irene and the case is dismissed.

Irene is charmed by Bronte Langford (Stefanie Caccamo) whom she meets in the city after undergoing a health check up. Unknown to her, Bronte intends to scam Irene and Summer Bay. Dana Matheson (Ally Harris) is suspicious of Bronte, but Irene goes against Dana and sides with Bronte, a choice she later regrets when Bronte's schemes and attempts to cover them up by kidnapping Dana are ultimately exposed and she is sent to jail. Irene offers the idea to sue The Pier after a dangerous outbreak from water pipes causes tension between Irene and Leah. Irene begins drinking again, due to Bronte's scheming and Irene feeling she caused the whole issue. Irene enters into rehab after she falls down the stairs of her home and is caught drinking by Bree Cameron (Juliet Godwin) at the hospital.

Irene begins to experience memory lapses and she confides in John that she think there is something wrong with her. He accompanies her to the hospital, where Bree runs a series of tests and gives Irene a preliminary diagnosis of Alzheimer's disease, which is confirmed after a visit to a neurologist. Irene tells Leah and signs her half of the diner over to her. After telling the rest of her friends, Irene decides to sell her house and go travelling while she still can. Her friends throw her a farewell party, complete with a music performance from Justin Morgan (James Stewart) and Theo Poulos (Matt Evans). John is late to the party, having struggled to accept Irene's imminent departure, but he delivers a speech and dances with Irene, who later presents him with a ticket to Paris. Irene thanks everyone for coming and tells them to continue the party, while she leaves. After she collects her case and passport, Sonny Baldwin (Ryan Bown) drives Irene out of Summer Bay.

== Reception ==
For her portrayal of Irene, McGranger was nominated for "Best Supporting Actress" and Irene for "Biggest Laugh in Soap" at the 1997 Inside Soap Awards. At the 2007 Inside Soap Awards she was nominated in the category of "Funniest Performance" for her portrayal. Irene and Leah's friendship won the 2015 TV Week and Soap Extra #OMGAward for Best BFFs. In August 2017, McGranger was longlisted for Best Daytime Star at the Inside Soap Awards. She made the viewer-voted shortlist, but lost out to Lorna Laidlaw, who portrays Mrs Tembe in Doctors. In 2023, McGranger received a nomination for the Logie Award for Most Popular Actress. Two years later, she won both the Gold Logie Award for Most Popular Personality on Australian Television and Best Lead Actress in a Drama. Also in 2025, McGranger received a nomination in the "Soaps - Best Actor" category the Digital Spy Reader Awards. McGranger was longlisted for Best Exit at the 2026 Inside Soap Awards, while "Irene's Alzheimer's diagnosis" was listed for Best Storyline.

Describing Phillips' incarnation of Irene, TV Week's Shelley stated "she has all the charm of a blowtorch and a temperament to match. She's rude, abusive, insensitive, bloody minded, with a charisma reading of zilch." He added that Phillips stole "the mantle of the nastiest bitch on television in Australia" from Cornelia Frances who played fellow character Morag Bellingham.

The Sydney Morning Herald have referred to Irene as one of the serial's three "legacy characters", along with Alf and Colleen. Holy Soap recall Irene's most memorable moment as: "Being attacked by the mad ex-wife of her former lover Ken." In Catherine Deveny's book "It's not my fault they print them" described Irene as "the rough diamond with a heart of gold that speaks fluent Aussie cliché." She added that there was no need for her to speak so Australian with the use of dialogue such as: "Fair dinkum" and "What the flipping 'eck is goin' on?"

In 2018, writers for TV Week included Irene in their feature on the "Top 20 Home and Away characters of all time". They wrote, "For more than 20 years, Irene has been the battler of Summer Bay. The resilient redhead has fought breast cancer, alcoholism and stalkers – to name just a few. Yet she's always bounced back using her strength and 'flippin' heck' catchphrase. Irene's open-door policy has seen all walks of life receive her advice and a hot cuppa. But her kind heart gets her into strife. As of 2019, the arrival of her troubled son Mick (Kristian Schmid) reopened a dark chapter and put her at odds with bestie and business partner Leah." Another writer for the publication praised the character, writing "Loved worldwide, the popular character is the ultimate true-blue battler, known for her welcoming presence to her foster children, warm heart and quick-witted remarks. And for her rollercoaster life in Summer Bay!"

In November 2021, three critics for The West Australian placed Irene at number two in their feature on the "Top 50 heroes we love and villains we hate" from Home and Away. They praised the character, stating: "There was definitely a touch of Annie's Miss Hannigan about Irene Roberts when she first landed in the Bay as a washed-up alcoholic. However, once she sobered up, this weather-beaten Aussie battler proved she had a heart of gold as she set about welcoming a steady stream of stray, troubled children into her home for a shoulder to cry on, a hot cuppa and a place to stay. Irene is one of the longest-running characters on the show, and the woman behind the character, Lynne McGranger, has become a bona fide national treasure."

Ahead of the character's departure from the serial, Tamara Cullen of TV Week stated: "Irene leaves behind a legacy that won't ever be forgotten. With her fiery attitude, unwavering loyalty and big heart, she's the everyday battler we can all relate to and even find some solace in."
