= KC Mitchell =

American powerlifter (born 1986)

- Occupation: powerlifting
- Height: 6 ft 0 in (1.83 m)
- Military career
- Allegiance: United States
- Branch: United States Army
- Awards: Purple Heart; National Defense Service Medal; Global War on Terrorism Service Medal; Overseas Service Ribbon; Iraq Campaign Medal; Afghanistan Campaign Medal

KC Mitchell (born 1986) is an American powerlifter and former soldier. He is the first amputee to compete for a national powerlifting title.

He was wounded while serving with the U.S Army in Afghanistan in Kandahar province.

On April 3, 2010, he was on a mounted night patrol, when the vehicle he was in struck an explosive device. He sustained extensive injuries that required his left leg to be amputated. He required 44 surgeries as a result of this injuries, he suffered with painkiller addiction, alcoholism and depression during his recovery.

In January 2017, he competed in the USPA American Cup Los Angeles.

== Personal records ==
Powerlifting Competition Records

done in official Powerlifting full meets

- Squat – 197.5 kg (435.4 lbs)
- Bench press – 202 kg (446.4 lbs)
- Deadlift – 272.5 kg (600.8 lbs)
- Total – 662.5 kg (1460.5 lbs)
