= Megan Connolly (actress) =

Australian actress (1974–2001)

- Born: Megan Jennifer Connolly; 9 April 1974; Sydney, New South Wales, Australia
- Died: 6 September 2001 (aged 27); Sydney, New South Wales, Australia
- Occupations: Actress, VJ (media personality)

Megan Jennifer Connolly (9 April 1974 – 6 September 2001) was an Australian actress, mainly of soap opera. She grew up in the northern Sydney suburb of St Ives, New South Wales.

== Career ==
Connolly's film debut was 1990's The Crossing with Russell Crowe. She later played Tori Hayden in the soap opera Paradise Beach Later she hosted the television shows The Zone and Body Corp. She also acted in the TV series Breakers.

She was Foxtel's Channel V VJ through 1997. On stage, she starred in the musical Resurrected!. Connolly temporarily replaced Belinda Emmett as Rebecca Nash in Home and Away.

== Death ==
Megan died from a heroin overdose on 6 September 2001 at the age of 27 while staying at a relative's home in New South Wales, Australia.
