= Belinda Emmett =

Australian actress and singer (1974–2006)

- Belinda Emmett as Rebecca Nash in Seven Network TV series Home and Away
- Born: Belinda Jane Emmett; 12 April 1974; Gosford, New South Wales, Australia
- Died: 11 November 2006 (aged 32); Sydney, New South Wales, Australia
- Cause of death: Breast cancer
- Other name: Belinda McManus (married name)
- Occupations: Actress, singer
- Years active: 1994–2006
- Spouse: Rove McManus (m. 2005)

Belinda Jane Emmett (12 April 1974 – 11 November 2006) was an Australian actress and singer. She was best known for her roles in the TV drama series Home and Away and All Saints as well as the sitcom Hey Dad..!. She was married to Australian television host, comedian and media personality Rove McManus.

== Early life ==
Emmett was born in Gosford to Michael and Laraine Emmett and grew up in Umina Beach, on the Central Coast of New South Wales. She had three siblings named Matthew, Shane and Lesley. Emmett went to school at St John's at Woy Woy, St Joseph's at Gosford and Corpus Christi College.

== Career ==
Emmett worked at the local Coast Rock FM radio station and sang lead vocals in the band Big Baby Jam. In 1994, she gained her first major role on Australian television as Tracy Russell in the sitcom Hey Dad..!. In 1995, she joined Home and Away, playing Gail, a local fisherman's daughter, who fell for Travis Nash, played by Nic Testoni. In 1996, she became the third actress to play Rebecca Fisher, where she portrayed the daughter of school headmaster Donald Fisher and later wife of Travis Nash. This role earned her nominations for Silver Logie for Most Popular Actress in 1998 and 1999, as well as a Gold Logie nomination in 1999. She posed naked in the special "Angels and Devils" edition of the Australian nude celebrity art magazine Black+White.

From 2000 to 2001, Emmett played Jodi Horner the Ward Clerk, in the medical drama All Saints.

== Music career ==
In 1998, Emmett released a cover of Michael Jackson's "Off the Wall". She also recorded a duet with Marcia Hines, a cover of the James Taylor hit "Shower the People" (on which Carly Simon sang backing vocals), which appeared on Hines' 2004 album Hinesight – Songs From the Journey. Emmett's first album, So I Am, was released after her death and debuted at number 10 on the ARIA Charts. It featured 12 songs co-written by Emmett and longtime collaborators Phill Buckle, Andrew Furze and others.

=== Albums ===
List of albums, with selected chart positions and certifications
Title	Album details	Peak chart positions	Certifications
Title	Album details	AUS	Certifications
So I Am	Released: April 2007; Label: Liberation Music (LIBCD9238-2); Formats: CD, digital download	8	ARIA: Gold

== Personal life ==
On 29 January 2005, Emmett married comedian and TV personality Rove McManus, at the Mary Immaculate Church in Waverley in the eastern part of Sydney. She walked down the aisle to Stevie Wonder's ballad "You Are the Sunshine of My Life". The couple had met at the opening of Fox Studios in Sydney in 1999. "We're kindred spirits", Emmett told a newspaper at the time. Guests included Marcia Hines, Stephen Curry, Merrick Watts and Peter Helliar. At their reception, the couple danced to Ben Folds' song "The Luckiest".

=== Breast cancer ===
Emmett was diagnosed with breast cancer in 1998, aged 24. She took a break from her role as Rebecca Fisher/Nash on Home and Away (during which time the part was played by Megan Connolly) and underwent surgery to remove a malignant tumour, followed by six weeks of radiotherapy. She left the cast of Home and Away the following year and went on to appear in nine episodes of All Saints as Jodi Horner between 2000 and 2001.

In September 2001, on the set of the Australian film The Nugget in which she co-starred as Cheryl with Eric Bana, Emmett began to experience intense back pain.

In 2002, she told The Australian Women's Weekly that "It wasn't a matter of if, it was a matter of when. The little bastards were going to get me. It was a weird sensation, almost an out-of-body experience. I don't think I'll ever be able to explain it." In an interview with Charles Wooley on 60 Minutes that same year, she said:

"I think people underestimate the power that they have within themselves, I really do, and I think these kinds of challenges, they force you to look that little bit deeper and see what you're really made of. I always knew I was pretty strong. I've always been pretty gutsy and pretty ballsy, but I think I surprised myself this time around."

=== Death ===
On 11 November 2006, Emmett died from cancer at St Vincent's Hospital in Sydney, at the age of 32. She had been there since reportedly suffering "stroke-like symptoms" the previous Monday.

Prime Minister of Australia, John Howard, said he and Mrs Howard were saddened by Emmett's death. "She fought a very courageous battle against cancer", Howard said. "On behalf of Janette and myself, I extend my deepest sympathies to her husband, Rove McManus, and her family and friends." Opposition Leader Kim Beazley also passed on his sympathies, but mistakenly said "Karl Rove" instead of "Rove McManus" when he did so. "This is truly sad news which I think will affect all Australians", Beazley said. "The tenderness and care in their relationship (Rove and Belinda) through their adversity, I think, has been an inspiration to many, many Australians."

Emmett's funeral was held at 11am on 17 November 2006 in Sydney's Mary Immaculate Church, the place where she married Rove McManus 18 months before. She was privately cremated. Belinda's ashes are interred at Palmdale Lawn Cemetery & Memorial Park on the Central Coast, New South Wales.

== Tributes ==
Australian singer/songwriter Delta Goodrem (who herself had been diagnosed with cancer as an 18-year-old in July 2003) co-wrote the song "Be Strong" for Emmett in 2004 after Emmett had been diagnosed with secondary bone cancer. On 13 and 14 November 2006, Channel 7 programs Home and Away and All Saints each dedicated an episode to Emmett. The message in the closing credits read "In memory of our friend, Belinda Emmett 1974–2006". It also had information for people to donate money for breast cancer research. On 17 November 2006, Home and Away included a special montage of scenes featuring Emmett in her role as Rebecca Fisher/Nash. It was followed by a black screen showing the same memorial message as well as information about donating to The McGrath Foundation. ABC program Spicks & Specks also displayed a memorial note at the conclusion of an episode aired on 15 November 2006.

On 16 November 2006, Belinda Emmett's family released one of her songs, "Less Than Perfect", on Odeo. The track, from a solo album she was working on at the time of her death, was also played at her funeral. One month later, Emmett's younger brother Shane performed "One Sweet Day" at the annual Carols in the Domain in tribute to his sister, who regularly appeared at the event between 1995 and 2002.

In a newspaper interview published on 1 April 2007 promoting his return to television, Rove McManus revealed that Emmett's solo album had been completed. The title track, "So I Am", was issued as a single the next day, with the album following on 28 April 2007. Profits from Hooch Records, the company Emmett formed with McManus to release the album, were sent to the McGrath Foundation to support breast-care nurses.

In July 2007, ABC TV aired the episode "Some Meaning in this Life" of the documentary series Australian Story which paid tribute to Emmett and her struggle with cancer. Her co-star in The Nugget Eric Bana introduced the episode which featured contributions from Emmett's family and Rove McManus. The episode won the award for most outstanding public affairs report at the 2008 Logie Awards.

In an episode of The Chasers War on Everything, Andrew Hansen sang a satirical eulogy about glorifying public figures after their deaths. After a few examples, Hansen pretended to start a verse about Emmett, before being signalled to stop by the other Chaser members. About her inclusion in the eulogy, the writer of the song, and fellow War on Everything member, Chris Taylor said: "We weren't making a joke about Belinda Emmett. We were making a joke about the inappropriateness of making a joke about Belinda Emmett." He elaborated that her mention in the song was different because "she didn't live a life of hypocrisy or selfishness [unlike the others in the song]".

On 11 November 2007, a year after Emmett's death, her widower Rove McManus dedicated his weekly show Rove to her memory.

On 20 May 2008, one of Emmett's songs, "Beautiful Thing", was included in Olivia Newton-John's new album entitled A Celebration in Song: Olivia Newton-John and Friends. CDs were sold to help raise funds for Olivia's wellness centre in Melbourne, Australia. It consists of a number of duets with Australian and international guest artists which are meant to inspire people touched by cancer. Belinda's song was extracted from her So I Am album.
