= Jessica Redmayne =

Australian actress

- Occupation: Actress
- Years active: 2017-present
- Known for: Home and Away

Jessica Redmayne is an Australian actress best known for playing Harper Matheson in the Australian television serial Home and Away. Redmayne has also had minor roles on shows such as Wentworth Prison, Fisk and Five Bedrooms as well as a recurring role in 800 Words.

== Early life and education ==
Redmayne trained throughout her childhood in all genres of dance and later pursued a Bachelor of Arts degree in musical theatre in Federation University Arts Academy. Redmayne graduated in 2013.

After the completion of her degree, Redmayne travelled throughout Asia where she worked in hosting stage productions for Nickelodeon and Hi-5.

== Career ==
Redmayne made her screen debut playing the role of Poppy Kelly in popular Australian television series 800 Words in its third season in 2017. She appeared in 12 episodes in a recurring capacity.

Redmayne then appeared in guest roles across a variety of television shows including The Inbestigators, Wentworth, Fisk and Five Bedrooms. Redmayne also acted as a body double for Madeleine West in her roles as Dee Bliss and Andrea Somers in Australian soap opera Neighbours.

In 2023, Redmayne landed the role of social worker Harper Matheson in the long-running Australian television serial Home and Away. Redmayne spoke of her casting at the time and expressed her joy at becoming a part of the serial. Redmayne stated that the character of Harper resonated with who she was as a person and revealed that they shared similar core values and beliefs.

== Personal life ==
In 2014, Redmayne's mother, Christine Redmayne was diagnosed with dementia. In 2023, Redmayne was appointed an ambassador of Dementia Australia after her mother lost her battle to dementia. Redmayne spoke about how her family sought support from Dementia Australia and commended the organisation. Through her role as being an ambassador for Dementia Australia, Redmayne has spoken openly about her mother's symptoms and progression with the condition and about the realities of having a parent with the condition.

== Filmography ==
Year	Title	Role	Note
2017–2018	800 Words	Poppy Kelly	Season 3 (Recurring role, 12 episodes)
2019	The Inbestigators	Natasha	1 episode
2020	Neighbours	Dee Bliss (double) Andrea Somers (double)	7 episodes
2020	Wentworth	Travel Agent	1 episode
2020	Paper Champions	Vanessa	Feature film
2021	Fisk	Kellie-Joy	1 episode
2022	Five Bedrooms	Madison	1 episode
2023–2026	Home and Away	Harper Matheson	Season 36 - Season 39 (280 Episodes)
