= Amy Mizzi =

Australian actress (born 1983)

- Born: 21 July 1983 (age 43); Bateau Bay, New South Wales, Australia
- Education: The McDonald College, NSW
- Occupations: Actress, singing and dance teacher
- Years active: 2003–2010
- Known for: Home and Away (2003–2007)

Amy Mizzi (born 21 July 1983) is an Australian former actress, known for her role as Kit Hunter in Home and Away.

== Early life ==
Mizzi was born in Bateau Bay, on the Central coast of New South Wales. She started out as a dancer, studying Jazz, Ballet and Tap at Dance Power Studios, from the age of three. She completed a Cert 4 in Performing Arts at The McDonald College.

== Career ==
Mizzi starred as Kit Hunter in the Australian soap opera Home and Away from 2003. Her departure from the series was announced on 13 February 2004, but she continued to appear on a recurring basis throughout 2004 and returned in August 2005. She also made appearances in 2006, and throughout most of 2007, most recently in the last episode of Home and Away for 2006, when she returned pregnant with the baby of Kim Hyde (played by actor Chris Hemsworth).

Mizzi was nominated for Most Popular New Female Talent in the Logie Awards of 2004, but the award was won by her Home and Away co-star Isabel Lucas.

After leaving Home and Away, Mizzi taught singing and dancing on the Central Coast of New South Wales. In 2008, she relocated to the United Kingdom, and has since appeared in stage productions, playing the title role in Cinderella and Princess Jasmine Aladdin. She then relocated to New Zealand, where she taught dance and performance classes. After marrying her partner Shaune, the pair had two children and moved to Australia. She currently teaches on the Central Coast in NSW.

== Filmography ==
=== Television ===
Year	Title	Role	Notes
2003–2007	Home and Away	Kit Hunter	62 episodes
2007	Hammer Bay	Vanessa 'Pop' Hall	TV movie

=== Stage ===
Year	Title	Role	Notes
2004	The Muf-Tee Show		Stables Theatre, Sydney with La Fura dels Baus
2007–2008	Aladdin	Princess Jasmine	Rotherham Civic Theatre, Yorkshire
2009–2010	Cinderella	Cinderella	Swallows Leisure Centre, Sittingbourne, Kent, Dorking Halls, Surrey
