= Marilyn Chambers (Home and Away) =

Fictional character from the Australian soap opera Home and Away

- Home and Away character
- Portrayed by: Emily Symons
- Duration: 1989–1992, 1995–1999, 2001, 2010–present
- First appearance: 18 May 1989
- Introduced by: Des Monaghan (1989); John Holmes (1995); Julie McGauran (2001); Cameron Welsh (2010)
In-universe information
- Occupation: Waitress; Student; Shop assistant; Child minder; Hairdresser and salon owner; Fortune teller; Foster parent
- Father: George Davidson
- Mother: Heather Davidson
- Husband: Phil Bryant (1992–1995); Donald Fisher (1996–2001); John Palmer (2014–2021)
- Sons: Byron Fisher
- Daughters: Heather Frazer
- Adoptive sons: Jett James
- Stepdaughters: Rebecca Nash; Shandi Ayres
- Aunts: Jean Chambers

Marilyn Chambers (also Bryant and Fisher) is a fictional character from the Australian soap opera Home and Away, played by Emily Symons. She made her first screen appearance during the episode broadcast on 18 May 1989. When Symons auditioned for the role she created a backstory for the character and dressed in a mini dress, stilettos and put on a breathy voice. She was successful and producer Andrew Howie cast her in the role. Writers introduced her as the girlfriend of established character Lance Smart (Peter Vroom). Marilyn is characterised as a bubbly and ditsy hairdresser. She has a distinct bouffant hairstyle and unique dress sense which includes high heel shoes. Marilyn has become one of the show's most iconic characters during her tenure.

Symons departed on 23 July 1992, but she returned on 5 June 1995 and stayed for four years, making her last appearance on 1 October 1999. She made a brief return from 31 August 2001 to 4 September 2001. In 2010, it was announced that Symons would be returning to Home and Away and Marilyn returned on 19 March 2010. Marilyn's storylines have included being married twice, suffering from post-natal depression, losing her son, receiving an electric shock, and developing cancer. Her significant relationships have been with Donald Fisher (Norman Coburn), Sid Walker (Robert Mammone) and later John Palmer (Shane Withington).

== Casting ==
"I'd worked it with my acting teacher at the time and we had done a backstory and we had everything down pat, the voice, the breathy voice and the stilettos and the way she walked and the way she was physically and I just knew her inside and out."

— Symons discussing her audition preparation. (2019)

Symons was nervous when she decided to audition for the role because she had previously been turned down for several parts in other shows. To prepare for her audition Symons and her acting coach created a backstory for Marilyn and they got to know her better. Symons decided to put on a "breathy voice" and purchased stiletto shoes for the character. This left Symons feeling like she knew exactly how the character should be portrayed.

Symons travelled to Kings Cross area of Sydney for her audition and was accompanied by her mother. She made her parent wait in a nearby coffee shop and had to climb over a drunk sleeper obstructing the audition building doorway. Symons was pessimistic about gaining the role because so many actresses turned up to audition. She entered the audition dressed in a mini dress, stilettos and a face full of "big eighties make-up". She was successful and invited back to the subsequent stages of the audition. Symons felt that she impressed the casting department and producer Andrew Howie offered her the role and she began filming her first scenes is March 1989. Dannii Minogue also auditioned for the role of Marilyn, before she was given the role of Emma Jackson. Symons made her first screen appearance as Marilyn in 1989. Within months of joining Home and Away, Symons had lost a stone in weight which concerned producers. They considered recasting the role but Symons soon sought help. She later told a reporter from TVTimes that "Marilyn's clothes began to hang on me like rags."

In December 1991, David Brown from TV Week reported that Symons had decided to leave Home and Away. He revealed that she would film her final scenes in March 1992 and that Marilyn's departure scenes would air in July. The actress decided to leave to marry Nick Lipscombe. Discussing her departure, Symons told a reporter from TVTimes that "I'd been in Home and Away for three years and even though I loved it, it was definitely time for a change. If I hadn't of met Nick I might have stayed longer." Three years after separating from Lipscombe, Symons returned to the soap. She stayed for another four years, before announcing her departure in 1999, so she could move to England to be with her then fiancé. She filmed her last scenes towards the end of the year. In 2001, Home and Away came to the United Kingdom to film some special episodes to help celebrate the show's return to British screens. Symons re-joined the cast as Marilyn for the London filming. On her return Symons said "When I left Home and Away two years ago I actually asked for my character Marilyn to be killed off. Now I'm glad they didn't."

== Character development ==
=== Characterisation ===
When Marilyn is introduced into the series she lives in the neighbouring town of Yabbie Creek and works as a hairdresser and beautician. Symons told Jason Smith from the official Home and Away podcast that she was "very ditsy, she was an orphan and she hadn't completed her education. She used to get quite muddled and all her words mixed up, full of life but not very smart." Symons chose three words to describe her as "kind, funny and warm". The show's producer Lucy Addario described her as "beautiful, kind and a girls best friend", adding that she is a "nurturing" character.

Marilyn has also been described as the "ditzy chick-next-door" who has a heart of gold, but lacked a "bit of common sense". A writer for Holy Soap called Marilyn "bubbly" and a "Dizzy blonde beautician". Marilyn is known for her bouffant hairstyle and her "daring" dress sense. Of this Symons said "Marilyn is who she is and doesn't care what anybody thinks. In her mind that's how a lady of her age would dress – she thinks it's absolutely normal and is proud of her style, although Colleen definitely disapproves!" When asked if she would like Marilyn to receive a makeover, Symons said that she does not want to see her character change. She explained that Marilyn would not be Marilyn and a makeover would not be "true to the character."

To add authenticity to Marilyn's role as the local hairdresser and beautician, writers created a story in which she opens her own salon. She calls her business "Marylin Chambers' Beauty Chamber" and off-screen production struggled to decide where the salon should be located. They created an additional set which was attached to the fictional diner included in the show. The Home and Away art designer Ken McCann decided to decorate it in a "camp" leopard print style setting. In this set Marilyn would portray comedy stories in which she ruins other character's hair styles in ditsy mistakes.

Symons described the 2010 Marilyn as "still the bubbly, positive, energetic and slightly bonkers '80s chick, but more spiritual". She added that Marilyn has done a lot of soul searching and feels that she now has a reason to come back. She has a new lease on life and she is embracing religions, magic and tribal beliefs. Her "ultra positive outlook" on life and her vegan food annoyed Miles Copeland (Josh Quong Tart), but they soon got used to living together. Holy Soap also said that Marilyn has known "severe heartache" after she lost her son, Byron to cancer, divorced Donald and is now seriously ill. Yahoo!7 say that she is still "tender" over Byron's death, but she has come to realise that life is for living. Marilyn's best friend, Mitzy Fraser (Helen Dallimore), is a "kindred soul". She is a psychic, who helped Marilyn deal with her grief over Byron and her recovery from cancer. Dallimore described Marilyn as "sweet, open minded and trusting."

=== Early relationships ===
Marilyn's first relationship is with Lance Smart (Peter Vroom) and ultimately the pairing does not work out. First Marilyn and Lance get engaged and she goes wedding dress shopping. Their engagement followed a series of arguments curbed by Lance planning a surprise meal and marriage proposal. Symons told to David Brown writing for TV Week "that's what she's always wanted, then she goes full swing. She buys a wedding dress and starts to refurbish Lance's home!" Symons later recalled "I've got a old photo of me [Marilyn] in a wedding dress, but he dumped Marilyn before they got to the altar, so the wedding never happened." The breakdown of their relationship came at a time when Vroom was due to leave the series. They also had to contend with Lance's mother Colleen Smart (Lyn Collingwood). She is over protective of Lance and writers never forget this link. By the time Marilyn returned in 2010, Colleen still does not "like or trust" Marilyn for breaking "her Lancey's' heart".

In late 1990, writers developed Marilyn's next romantic relationship with Adam Cameron (Mat Stevenson). Symons and Stevenson were also featured as the cover stars on TV Week's issue dated 29 December 1990. In the magazine, David Brown revealed that writers had planned "more romantic problems" for the two characters, which would play out following the 1991 series debut. Another reporter added that they "ended the year as lovers, but TV Week can reveal that there is trouble ahead for the two teenagers."

=== Marriage to Phil Bryant ===
Marilyn goes through "a tough time" when it comes to relationships until she meets Phil Bryant (Vince Martin), a "no-nonsense country bloke". Phil turns up in Summer Bay to drop off his teenage daughter, Toni (Kathryn Dufty), on a school exchange trip. When he almost collides with Marilyn and crashes his car, he is forced to stay in the area longer than planned. Marilyn takes an immediate liking to Phil and he is won over by her "bubbly personality." However, he does have doubts about how the relationship will work as Marilyn is twenty-four and he is forty. Marilyn eventually convinces him that he is the man for her and Martin explained, "Phil will bring her the stability she needs in her life. His maturity and her enthusiasm for life will make a nice balance. Besides, Marilyn's had her heart broken too often." After a few ups and downs, Phil asks Marilyn to marry him and she accepts.

The age difference between the two characters caused problems with Phil's daughter Toni. Symons defended Marilyn choice in partner and told a TVTimes writer that "Marilyn had always been looking for a kind of father figure in her life and Phil's come along at just the right time." She described the age difference as a "bonus" for Marilyn because he can offer "security" and "settle her down". The marry and leave the Bay to start a new life together. Martin commented that the idea of Marilyn living on an isolated bush farm seemed unlikely and thought she would feel out of place. He added "On top of that, they've only known each other for a few weeks when they decide to marry. But if their love is strong enough, they'll make a go of it." Discussing their exit from the show, Symons believed the character's romance was true to her own personal life. Symons was leaving to marry her partner and she added "now Marilyn's planning a bright new future and so am I. I know I'm going to be very happy - hope that Marilyn will too."

=== Marriage to Donald Fisher ===
One of Marilyn's most important story arcs saw her begin an unlikely relationship with Donald Fisher (Norman Coburn). When Marilyn decides to go back to school as a mature student to get her HSC, she and headmaster Donald grow close. Years later when she returns to Summer Bay the friendship continues and, to the shock of the local residents, they begin a romance. Their marriage was one of Home and Away's most shocking storylines as Donald was twice Marilyn's age. Of this, Symons said "Although the storyline of a girl's affair with a much older man was a controversial one, in the end it went down well with the viewers." Marilyn and Donald's wedding ceremony was filmed on location at Palm Beach on one of the coldest days in Sydney for one hundred years. Symons said "the wedding dress wasn't exactly a winter frock. It really was absolutely freezing. We were all purple and chilled at the end of the day." The character's wedding reception and dance scenes were filmed in the comfort of a warm studio.

Marilyn yearns to have a child and after a miscarriage and years of trying, she undergoes risky surgery in a bid to conceive. Symons told Steven Murphy from Inside Soap that Marilyn is putting her life in danger because the operation could kill her. She defended her character, adding "it's so important to her, Donald doesn't want her to have the operation, but he supports her all the way when he realises how determined she is." Filming the story proved difficult for Symons, who had to portray a number of emotional scenes. In one scene Marilyn and Donald are "nervous and frightened" as she is about to be taken to theatre. Symons described their plight as "really quite moving" and while she was happy to explore more serious stories for her character, she found it "emotionally draining." Marilyn is known for her stylish dress sense and during the story she was often seen in a pink tracksuit. Symons felt uncomfortable in it and preferred her character's mini dresses and high heel shoes. She added "it was horrible, the more I cried in the scenes, the worse I looked - so the producers left me that way." Symons concluded that Marilyn would make a "wonderful mum" because of her "energy and enthusiasm."

Marilyn eventually becomes pregnant, much to her and Donald's delight. Symons had to wear a fatsuit for the storyline and she told an Inside Soap reporter that it made her sympathetic to real mums-to-be. Marilyn goes into labour two weeks early with Vinnie Patterson (Ryan Kwanten) at her side. Symons explained the situation, "All of a sudden Marilyn doubles up in pain and realises that the baby is coming. It's all terribly dramatic it's down to Vinnie to try to get her to the hospital in time."

At the hospital, complications develop and put the baby's life in danger, so the doctors decide to put Marilyn under anaesthetic and perform a caesarean. The baby, a boy, is delivered safely, but when he is handed to Marilyn she does not understand why she was not awake for his birth. Marilyn is also upset that Donald missed the birth and Symons said "She's still in shock and a lot of pain - she can't quite believe it's all happened and that this baby is hers." Donald and Marilyn decide to call their new son, Byron Vincent. The traumatic birth leaves Marilyn in a "shattered state of mind" and she finds it difficult to form an emotional bond with Byron. Symons said that Marilyn discovers that being a mother is hard work and the situation will put pressure on Marilyn and Donald. She added that she was happy that her character had finally achieved her dream of having a child and once the shock wore off, she believed that Marilyn would be a great mother. Months later Byron is diagnosed with a rare form of liver cancer and Marilyn and Donald's marriage begins to fall apart. They make the decision to leave Summer Bay and go to America to find treatment, although Donald returns to Summer Bay once Marilyn and Byron are settled. A few weeks later, Byron dies of an infection. Donald flies to America only to find that Marilyn has disappeared. After returning to Summer Bay, he receives a letter from her telling him that returning to him or Summer Bay would be too painful, effectively ending their marriage. A year later, Donald published a book as a memorial to his son and attended the launch in London. While there Marilyn, who was working in the UK as a nanny, attended the launch secretly but fled when Donald noticed her. She later agreed to meet him and the two discussed Byron's death, and while they accepted their marriage was over it allowed them both to feel a degree of closure.

=== 2010 return ===
In 2010, it was announced that Symons would be returning to Home and Away as a permanent cast member. The producers brought back the character of Marilyn after a meeting in mid-2009, which saw them decide to inject more comedy into the show. A suggestion to create a character just like Marilyn was put forward, but instead they chose to bring back the original character. Symons had returned to Australia in 2008 to care for her mother and the show's producers called her in September 2009, asking her to reprise the role of Marilyn. Of her decision to return, Symons said "I was very happy on the show and it's been a part of my life for so long; to come back to it is like coming back to a family." Symons added that she loves playing the character.

In meetings with scriptwriters, Symons made sure that they paid respect to her character's past, particularly the storyline where she lost Byron. Of this Symons said "With Marilyn there is so much history, so giving their son Byron some acknowledgement is important, just as its important to remember she was Mrs Bellingham's cleaner, that she worked in the shop with Alf and her storyline with Lance." The character's return marked the show's effort to lighten up the tone of recent plots and go back to the family-based storylines of the show's original layout. Marilyn returned to screens on 19 March 2010. Marilyn returns to Summer Bay with "a new lease on life" and a wooden ventriloquist's doll called Mr Oddly, which she decides to use for her new fortune telling business. Holy Soap explained that Marilyn has been "forever changed" by Byron's death and her cancer, but she is determined to live life to the full. Not long after her return, Marilyn begins a relationship with the local doctor, Sid Walker (Robert Mammone).

=== Adoption ===
"This is a dream come true for Marilyn, but of course, being a new mother has so many challenges."

— Symons on Marilyn becoming a mother again

When Nicole Franklin (Tessa James) discovers she is pregnant, the first person she tells is Marilyn. Nicole later decides to give her baby to Marilyn and Sid Walker (Robert Mammone). However, becoming a mother is one of Marilyn's dreams and her obsession with this and her controlling behaviour becomes too much for Nicole. Of the situation, Symons said "Marilyn is in Nicole's face every minute. She's doing it out of love, but she doesn't realise she's becoming obsessed with the baby." Nicole is still unsure whether she is making the right choice about her child's future and she snaps at Marilyn. When Nicole begins seeing Angus McCathie (Tim Pocock), Marilyn is left worried about their agreement and she feels "distanced." Symons explained, "Marilyn is scared of being replaced. She's scared of losing the baby, which could happen because there isn't a legal agreement." Marilyn talks to Roo Stewart (Georgie Parker) and she comes to the realisation that she needs to step back from the situation. Symons added that there is "still a long way to go" with the arrangement. Marilyn is then supportive and on hand to help Nicole. Nicole gives birth to a baby boy, George, and she hands him over to Marilyn a couple of days later. George struggles with being parted from his real mother and Nicole tries to stay away, but he needs her. Marilyn then becomes obsessed with Nicole having the power to take her new son back.

Symons later revealed that Nicole struggles to switch off her mothering instinct after giving George away. Nicole comes to visit the baby and Marilyn catches her breastfeeding George, while she is alone with him. Symons called the scenes "volatile." Marilyn has already had reservations about Nicole spending time with the baby and she fears that Nicole is getting too close. Of the breastfeeding moment, Symons said "Marilyn is shocked and offended, and this cuts to the very core of her worries - that she doesn't have the same natural mothering instincts as George's birth mother. Without a doubt, Marilyn thinks Nicole is overstepping the mark. She feels that a boundary has been overstepped and it could put a big strain on their relationship." After the incident, Marilyn asks Nicole to stay away from the baby. Marilyn becomes aware of Nicole's increasing interest in George and the ideas that Angelo Rosetta (Luke Jacobz) has been putting into her head. Of this, Holy Soap said "Marilyn's world begins to unravel when she realises that Nicole intends to reclaim George and, after seeking advice from Morag Bellingham (Cornelia Frances), she's faced with the reality that she doesn't have a legal leg to stand on." Marilyn becomes desperate and tries to discredit Nicole and Angelo as parents, but convincing Sid is hard for her as he has not been 100 percent into the idea of raising George. Marilyn takes George and Symons said "She's emotionally fragile [and] we've seen her break down and then become very resolved about keeping George. What she does next is out of character for her and very irresponsible. It will definitely shock viewers."

=== Electric shock and amnesia ===
In August 2015, it was announced that Marilyn would be electrocuted in "a freak accident" at the Diner. The storyline began when Marilyn came into contact with some exposed wires while mopping the floor of the Diner. Her friends Roo and Leah Patterson-Baker (Ada Nicodemou) found her lying lifeless on floor and called an ambulance. Marilyn's husband John Palmer (Shane Withington) was "devastated" when he learned what had happened and he rushed to the hospital to be with her. The actor commented, "John sees Marilyn as his last chance at love in many ways, and he's distraught." Marilyn was placed in an induced coma while her test results were being processed. John became frustrated when the doctors were unable to give him definite answers as to whether Marilyn would pull through.

When Marilyn woke up from the coma, she suffered from amnesia and thought it was 1996. She believed she was still married to Donald and failed to recognise John at all. As Marilyn recovered from her ordeal, she moved in with Irene Roberts (Lynne McGranger) and some of her memories started to return. She was also happy to see Alf Stewart (Ray Meagher) when he returned from a trip away. Meanwhile, John struggled to cope with Marilyn's memory loss, but he refused to give in and he asked Marilyn out on a date. Marilyn agreed and John used the opportunity to try to prompt her into remembering who he was. While John was telling Marilyn a story, it caused her to suddenly remember Sid. John felt "desperately sad" and wondered if it was time to end their marriage. However, as he left the Diner, Marilyn followed him out and recalled the moment they became a couple. John then told her the story and she remembered him and their wedding day.

=== Temporary departure and return ===
In February 2015, Symons announced that she was pregnant with her first child and would be taking six months maternity leave from the show starting in June. On-screen, Marilyn and John's marriage began to suffer in the wake of her accident and her changed outlook on life. She admitted that she was not ready to be a foster parent and that she also wanted to travel overseas. John did not share Marilyn's views and preferred to stay in the Bay, causing an argument. Shortly before their vow renewal ceremony, Marilyn learned that her adoptive son Jett James (Will McDonald) was unable to make it and she decided to call the whole thing off. Roo, Leah and Irene managed to talk her around and the ceremony went ahead. Marilyn then left the Bay to go travelling.

On 13 June 2016, Sophie Dainty of Digital Spy confirmed Marilyn would be returning during the week commencing 20 June. Symons said Marilyn would return home after learning Alf had suffered a heart attack. When she is reunited with John, it becomes apparent that Marilyn has changed during her time away. Symons explained, "He thought they could pick up just where they left off. But the dynamic between them has changed. She has come back more sophisticated and John is left feeling very parochial."

== Storylines ==
=== 1989–2001 ===
Marilyn arrives in Summer Bay from Sydney to see her boyfriend, Lance. When Lance hires a boat to impress her, he takes the wrong one and crashes it into Alf Stewart's boat. Marilyn and Lance go missing, but Lance comes back okay and he tells his friends that Marilyn went back to the city. She comes back a few days later and tells Lance that she is going to stay and get a job. Lance thinks they are moving too fast and Marilyn tells him that she going on a date with his housemate, Martin Dibble (Craig Thompson) instead. Marilyn dumps Lance and moves into a hotel, but Lance wins her back when he gets her a job at The Diner. However, Marilyn begins working for Morag instead. Lance introduces Marilyn to his mother, Colleen. When they start to get on too well, Lance becomes scared and breaks up with Marilyn. He then asks her to pretend she broke up with him, so Colleen does not come down hard on him. Colleen then believes that Marilyn broke Lance's heart. Marilyn dates Adam, before meeting and marrying Phil Bryant. Phil's teenage daughter, Toni, initially dislikes Marilyn as she is much younger than her father. Marilyn leaves the Bay with Phil, but three years later she returns and reveals that she has separated from Phil. She then opens and works in her own Hair and Beauty Salon. Marilyn becomes friends with Steven Matheson (Adam Willits) and they eventually begin a relationship. However, it does not last and they decide to just be friends.

Marilyn decides to go back to school and she meets the Principal, Donald Fisher. They begin a relationship, which shocks the locals as Donald is twice Marilyn's age. They eventually get engaged and marry. Marilyn longs to have a child, but she has a miscarriage and is told that she is sterile. She decides to undergo surgery to conceive and she later becomes pregnant. After visiting Vinnie Patterson to get an astrology reading, Marilyn goes into labour two weeks early. Vinnie finds her and drives Marilyn to the hospital. Complications develop with the birth and Marilyn is put under anaesthetic, so doctors can perform a cesarean. Marilyn delivers a baby boy, but she is upset that she was not awake for the birth and that Donald missed it. To show her gratitude to Vinnie, Marilyn names the baby, Byron Vincent. Marilyn struggles with post natal depression and she leaves Donald and Byron. When she returns a few months later, she discovers that Donald has hired a nanny and becomes jealous of her. She later recovers and grows to love her son. Months later, Byron is diagnosed with liver cancer and Marilyn's marriage starts to break up. She and Donald find out about a treatment for Byron in America and they leave the bay. During the trip, Byron dies, which leaves Marilyn heartbroken and she lets Donald go back to Australia alone.

In 2001, Donald goes to London for a book launch and thinks he sees Marilyn. She later turns up at his book reading and when she runs from the room, Donald chases after her. Marilyn apologises to him and gets on a train. She calls him the next day and they meet up. Marilyn tells him that she has become a childminder to get over Byron. They talk and decide to end their marriage. Donald later learns that Marilyn has cancer and flies to London to support her.

=== 2010– ===
Marilyn is driving back to the Bay, when she is forced to swerve her car after seeing Justin Jefferies (Matthew Walker) walking along the road covered in blood. Marilyn drives Justin to the hospital and then goes to find Alf at the Surf Club. He is happy to see her and he suggests that she stays at his house as she is almost family. Marilyn tells him that she has returned to the Bay for the foreseeable future. Miles, Romeo Smith (Luke Mitchell) and Nicole Franklin are overwhelmed by Marilyn and her new age ideas at first, but they get used to living with her. Marilyn starts having strange dreams about Miles' imaginary friend, Rabbit (Mitzi Ruhlman), and she later dreams about Byron. She tells Alf about her dreams, but he thinks she is taking them too seriously. She encourages Miles to get help. Marilyn reveals that she is ill and Alf and Miles ask her to help out in the bait shop as a distraction. However, she chooses to use the office space to open a fortune telling business instead. Colleen is not happy about the business and she writes to the Coastal News about it. Marilyn is upset, until Miles brings her first customers, Nicole and Penn Graham (Christian Clark), along. Marilyn meets Sid Walker at the hospital and she gives him her business card. They go on a date and then begin a relationship.

Marilyn supports Nicole after she breaks up with Penn and Sid's son, Dexter (Charles Cottier) develops a crush on her. Marilyn encourages Sid to talk to Dexter about his feelings for her. Marilyn's best friend, Mitzy arrives in town and tells Marilyn that she knows the time, day and month of her death. Sid does not believe Mitzy and Marilyn is not happy that he is not taking it seriously. Mitzy tells Marilyn that she has lung cancer and she later dies from a stroke. Sid asks Marilyn to move in with him and his children. As her end date draws closer, Marilyn decides to give away her possessions and make goodbye DVDs, which makes Sid uncomfortable. On the day of death, Marilyn sees a pram fall into the water and she jumps in to rescue the baby. She starts to drown and Sid finds her and manages to revive her. Nicole tells Marilyn that she is pregnant and Marilyn later offers to adopt the baby. Marilyn comes to the belief that Sid and Roo Stewart fancy each other. Nicole becomes fed up of Marilyn trying to take over and Marilyn apologises, realising that she needs to think of Nicole too. Nicole gives birth on the beach and Marilyn meets her and the baby at the hospital. Marilyn takes the baby boy and she and Sid name him George. Marilyn bonds with the baby and she holds a naming ceremony for him. Nicole later decides that she wants George back, devastating Marilyn. Marilyn takes George and decides to go to London, but Roo talks her into giving George back to Nicole.

Marilyn and Sid's relationship suffers and they break up. Marilyn moves back into Summer Bay House and she decides to become a hairdresser again to raise some money. Marilyn becomes upset when Sid tells her that he is seeing Roo. The two women argue, but eventually call a truce. Following a tarot card reading for Elijah Johnson (Jay Laga'aia), Marilyn briefly believes they should be together romantically. Sid opens up to Marilyn and reveals that he has another daughter called Sasha (Demi Harman). Elijah later introduces Sasha to Marilyn and she asks for a job. Marilyn supports Irene Roberts after she is diagnosed with breast cancer. Marilyn begins working at The Diner to help cover Irene's shifts and she helps organise a pink ribbon fund-raiser for her. Marilyn encourages Roo to give Harvey Ryan (Marcus Graham) another chance. After John Palmer moves in, Marilyn and Roo become annoyed with his irritating habits. They stage an intervention and encourage him to become a better housemate. Marilyn worries about Colleen after Lance reveals he is moving to Las Vegas and her caravan is robbed. Marilyn helps clean things up and she finds a winning lottery ticket, which she gives to Colleen and convinces her to spend the money wisely. Marilyn realises that Colleen just wants to be near Lance and she calls him on her behalf. Lance invites his mother to Las Vegas and Marilyn and Roo throw her a leaving party. A week later, Marilyn is mugged on her way home by Jett James. She decides not to press charges when Jett apologises. Marilyn befriends Danny Braxton (Andy McPhee) and he later takes her out for dinner. When Danny goes missing. Marilyn becomes worried. She is later upset when she hears he has died during a robbery. Despite this, Marilyn organises a funeral for him.

When John's wife Gina (Sonia Todd) dies of a brain aneurysm, Marilyn supports him through his grief and realises that she has feelings for John. Her friends dissuade her from asking him out as he is still grieving for Gina, but they eventually admit their feelings for each other and also go into business together. When John's adopted son Jett finds out about the relationship he is uncomfortable but eventually warms to Marilyn. Marilyn and John get engaged and marry. At the reception, Jett asks them to adopt him and they agree. The adoption is finalised a couple of weeks later.

After Jett leaves for military school, Marilyn and John try to become foster parents, but are initially turned down because of Marilyn's history with Nicole's son. While opening the Diner one morning, Marilyn notices some spilt water and mops it up. She mops the water towards some live wires and receives an electric shock. She is rushed to the hospital and placed in a coma. When she wakes up, she suffers from amnesia and loses twenty years worth of memories. She believes she is still married to Donald and does not recognise John at all. Irene, Leah and Roo try to help her, and Marilyn moves in with Irene while she recovers. John takes Marilyn out on a date, but his stories make her remember Sid and not him. John is close to giving up when Marilyn suddenly remembers their wedding day. Once recovered, Marilyn and John decide to renew their wedding vows. However, Marilyn suffers doubts and tells John about her desire to travel overseas. John accepts Marilyn's decision and gives her a plane ticket. Marilyn then changes her mind about the vow renewal and they go through with the ceremony. Afterwards, Marilyn says goodbye to John and leaves to travel around the world. When John learns she has broken her leg while in Italy, he flies out to support her. He returns a few weeks later, while Marilyn continues on to her next destination. Marilyn returns upon hearing Alf has suffered a heart attack and visits him in the hospital, where he wakes up. Marilyn's return surprises John and their friends. She expresses disappointment at having missed meeting Skye Peters (Marlo Kelly), who John briefly fostered. Marilyn tells John that she has asked for them to be placed back on the fostering program, but he is reluctant due to his bad experience with Skye. He changes his mind and they are soon given Jordan Walsh (Benny Turland) to foster. John tries too hard to bond with Jordan. Jordan bonds with John and Marilyn and agrees to stay with them, but when his father Aaron arrives to the bay to get him back, he accuses John and Marilyn for taking them away and Jordan stood up for them. Jordan decided to give his father a second chance and leaves. John and Marilyn later foster Raffy Morrison (Olivia Deeble), when her siblings has problems. However, Raffy struggles at home and at school. Raffy moves back with her family but later returns to live with them. John and Marilyn foster Ty Anderson (Darius Williams), who briefly dates Raffy. When Ty is hospitalised after injuring himself, he tells Marilyn and John that he is gay. Marilyn tracks down Ty's mother Jodi Anderson (Sara Zwangobani) and she comes to the Bay to see him. Ty decides to move to the city with her and leaves. Jett returns to the Bay to inform his parents that he is going to fight in Afghanistan and they disagree on the idea, but change their minds. Marilyn tracks Jett and learns that he has been injured. An army officer informs them that Jett has been paralysed and is in a hotel in Germany for treatment. Marilyn and John fly out to be with him and bring him back to the Bay for further treatment. Jett struggles with his fate and John and Marilyn try to support him. Jett eventually moves to the city, with John helping him settle in.

After Marilyn hears that Jett is getting married, and that John is going to pay for the wedding, she vows to help out financially too. Marilyn signs up to be an ambassador for Stunning Organics, a cosmetics company, and uses the diner as a base of operations. With the help of Kirby Aramoana (Angelina Thomson), she starts promoting the company and its products until Roo suffers an allergic reaction to some face cream. When Marilyn reaches out to the company for help, she is ignored. Marilyn and Kirby investigate the company on social media and a brick is thrown through the window of Irene's house. Marilyn takes to social media and tells everyone that she is being bullied into silence by the company and she calls the CEO a coward. Marilyn is sent further threats and Constable Cash Newman (Nicolas Cartwright) tells Marilyn and Kirby to stop posting about the company. After Marilyn gives an interview about Stunning Organics, the CEO sends her a bomb in a box of products. However, Marilyn asks John to dump all the boxes. When she receives a message with the word "kaboom", Marilyn realises that a bomb has been planted in the shipment. Mali Hudson (Kyle Shilling) goes after John and Roo, who has joined him, but the bomb goes off, injuring all three. Roo is taken to the city with spinal injuries, John undergoes surgery for internal bleeding and Mali has a perforated eardrum. Marilyn blames herself. She and Kirby later learn the CEO of Stunning Organics resigned weeks prior to the bombing and has been arrested. Marilyn is contacted by the new CEO of the company Carey Fielding (Eloise Snape), who wishes to hold a press conference and offers her $25,000. Alf asks that the press conference is held at the surf club, where Marilyn gives him the mic and he speaks about Roo's injuries. When Carey refuses to comment, she rushes outside and tells Alf that neither she or the company care about Roo, which goes viral. Marilyn discovers the company's brand ambassadors have quit and she is also released from her contract.

After returning from a hospital in the city, Roo blames Marilyn for her condition and tells her not to visit her anymore. She later asks Marilyn to leave the house and Roo fights with her until Irene steps in and tells Roo to grow up. Marilyn apologises for not visiting Roo in the hospital and blames herself for what happened. The pair reconcile and Roo reveals that she is more angry at the person who caused her injuries. Roo, Marilyn and Irene later get photos ready for Alf's secret presentation.

== Reception ==
Marilyn has become one of Home and Away's most iconic characters. For her portrayal of Marilyn, Symons was nominated for Best Actress at the 1999 Inside Soap Awards. That same year saw Symons named one of the twenty greatest soap stars of the 1990s by All About Soap. They said "Dizzy, vibrant, gaudy and bizarre, Emily Symons won over our hearts as loveable Marilyn Chambers in Home and Away." Marilyn and John's wedding won the 2015 TV Week and Soap Extra #OMGAward for Best Wedding. In 2022, Symons received a nomination for Best Daytime Star at the Inside Soap Awards. The following year, she received a nomination for the Logie Award for Most Popular Actress.

Dave Lanning from The People quipped that Marilyn "has the mind of a humming bird and often flaps like one". Sarah Thomas of The Sun-Herald branded Marilyn a "ditzy glamour puss". A writer for Holy Soap said that Marilyn's most memorable moment is "Realising she had fallen in love with school principal Don Fisher and eventually marrying him". On Marilyn's relationship with Donald, Chris Middendorp of The Age said "While it lasted, it was one of the oddest couplings in television and fun to watch. They were like what would happen if Lawrence (sic) Olivier got hitched to a page-three girl."

A Yahoo! reporter placed Marilyn and Donald on their "Best-ever soap couples" list and TV Week named them one of soap's "Odd Couples", saying "Who could forget grumpy old Donald Fisher with kooky young Marilyn Chambers in Home and Away?" The Sunday Mail simply brand her as "the dizzy wife of stuffy headmaster Donald". A writer from Inside Soap included Marilyn and Donald in their feature profiling unlikely couples. They branded her a "half-wit hairdresser" and him a "haggard head" who found happiness together. The writer added that "at least Marilyn Chambers had a good excuse for her bizarre decision to go out with the aging Donald Fisher - she was as mad as a mongoose." Following Marilyn's abrupt departure in 1999, the show was "bombarded" by fans demanding to know what had happened to her. Steven Murphy from Inside Soap assessed that by 1998, Marilyn had changed drastically. He stated "at one time she was the bubbly blonde who shone brighter than the sunshine of Summer Bay. However, sunlight has been in short supply in Marilyn Fisher's life of late."

Series producer Cameron Welsh said that there had been a "positive reaction" from fans to Marilyn's return in 2010. The Daily Telegraph said that the show needs Marilyn, "a sweet-natured good woman", after the scandals of last year. A columnist from Inside Soap called Marilyn a legend and said her return to Home and Away was the "best news ever". They added "[Symons] is so amazing in the show, we even prefer her to lovely Romeo's six-pack." The Birmingham Post stated some viewers felt Home and Away was not the same without the "curly haired Sheila". In February 2011, Marilyn was nominated for "Best Comeback" from the All About Soap Bubble Awards.

Claire Crick from All About Soap said that she never takes Marilyn’s "weirdo premonitions" seriously.

In 2014, a Sunday Mail writer did not think things would work out with John and Marilyn, commenting "the course of poor Marilyn's love life has never run smooth. As she prepares to move in with John, it doesn't appear this relationship will either, as she lays down a series of daunting laws to him." Writers for TV Week included Marilyn in their feature on the "Top 20 Home And Away characters of all time". They wrote, "The loveable Marilyn has brought lots of laughs to Summer Bay. But it's the heart-wrenching storylines around her son, Byron, that made a big impact." Tahlia Pritchard from Punkee stated that Home and Away always guaranteed its viewers a four things, which were "Alf, for one. Marilyn always smiling even if she’s angry or upset. Leah having something tragic happen to her because she can’t get a break. And some shirtless, good looking men."
