= List of Home and Away characters introduced in 2003 =

Home and Away is an Australian soap opera. The following is a list of characters that first appeared in 2003, by order of appearance. They were all introduced by the show's series producer Julie McGuaran. The 16th season of Home and Away began airing on the Seven Network on 13 January 2003. The year saw the introduction of The Hunters, a new family consisting of Scott (Kip Gamblin), his mother Beth (Clarissa House) and his younger siblings Kit (Amy Mizzi) and Robbie (Jason Smith), who all debuted in the respective months of January, April and November. Isabel Lucas began playing Tasha Andrews in July. Maggie Kirkpatrick began her second role on the serial as Viv "The Guv" Standish in November.

== Scott Hunter ==
Scott Hunter, played by Kip Gamblin, debuted on screen on 23 January 2003 and departed on 25 November 2005. For his portrayal of Scott, Gamblin won the "Most Popular New Male Talent" Logie Award in 2004. Linda Barnier of the Newcastle Herald described Scott as a "beefcake" and opined that his debut on his horse Jacko was a "very Man from Snowy River moment".

== Beth Hunter ==
Beth Hunter (née Walters, previously Sutherland), played by Clarissa House, made her first on-screen appearance on 17 April 2003 and departed on 30 January 2007. The serial's official website described Beth as an "open-minded" female who holds a "strong sense of personal morality and integrity". When characters get to know Beth she shows a "delicious sense of humour". Sacha Molitorisz of The Sydney Morning Herald said that the episode featuring Beth and Rhys' wedding was better suited to "die hard fans". They criticised the plot for being "unengaging" and opined that the music, performances and dialogue were "painful" and "patchy".

== Kit Hunter ==
Kit Hunter, played by Amy Mizzi, made her first on-screen appearance on 25 April 2003 and made her final appearance as a regular character in February 2004 but continued to reappear in a recurring capacity, making her final appearance on 3 July 2007. Isabel Lucas auditioned for the role of Kit, however, it was actress Amy Mizzi who was eventually cast. For her portrayal of Kit, Mizzi was nominated for the "Best New Female Talent" Logie Award in 2004.

== Tasha Andrews ==
Tasha Andrews, played by Isabel Lucas, made her first screen appearance in the episode broadcast on 31 July 2003 and departed the series on 10 October 2006. Lucas joined the serial in 2003 after being discovered by talent scout Sharron Meissner, who was on holiday at the time. Meissner encouraged Lucas to audition for the part of Kit Hunter, which eventually went to Amy Mizzi. However, Series Producer Julie McGuaran created the role of Tasha specifically for Lucas. Lucas was then required to move from her home town of Melbourne to Sydney, where the serial is filmed. For her portrayal of Tasha, Lucas won the Most Popular New Female Talent accolade at the 2004 Logie Awards. Brian Courtis of the Sunday Age referred to Tasha as a "Blonde Princess" ahead of her wedding to Robbie. In an interview with The Sunday Times, Catholic Priest Toby Sherring spoke out against the storyline where Mumma Rose convinces Tasha to join the Believers. He said: "Sometimes it is assumed that all churches operate like cults, who will steal away naive teenagers from their families, brainwash them with strange ideas and involve them in strange suicide pacts, or send them knocking on people's doors with predictions about the end of the world." He added: "Because religion in TV shows such as Home and Away is portrayed in this way, the media version is firstly more believable and secondly much more intriguing, although ultimately unappealing."

== Viv Standish ==
Viv Standish
- Home and Away character
- Portrayed by: Maggie Kirkpatrick
- Duration: 2003–2004
- First appearance: 11 November 2003
- Last appearance: 2 November 2004
- Introduced by: Julie McGuaran
- Book appearances: Prisoner No. 2549971
In-universe information
- Other names: The Guv
- Sisters: Hannah Standish
- Sons: Owen Dalby
- Grandsons: Ric Dalby

Vivienne "The Guv" Standish, played by Maggie Kirkpatrick, made her first appearance on 11 November and departed on 2 November 2004. Kirkpatrick previously guested in the serial in 1991 as Jean Chambers. Viv was introduced as part of Dani Sutherland's (Tammin Sursok) storyline involving her imprisonment for the attempted murder of Kane Phillips (Sam Atwell). Filming took place at the old Maitland Gaol.

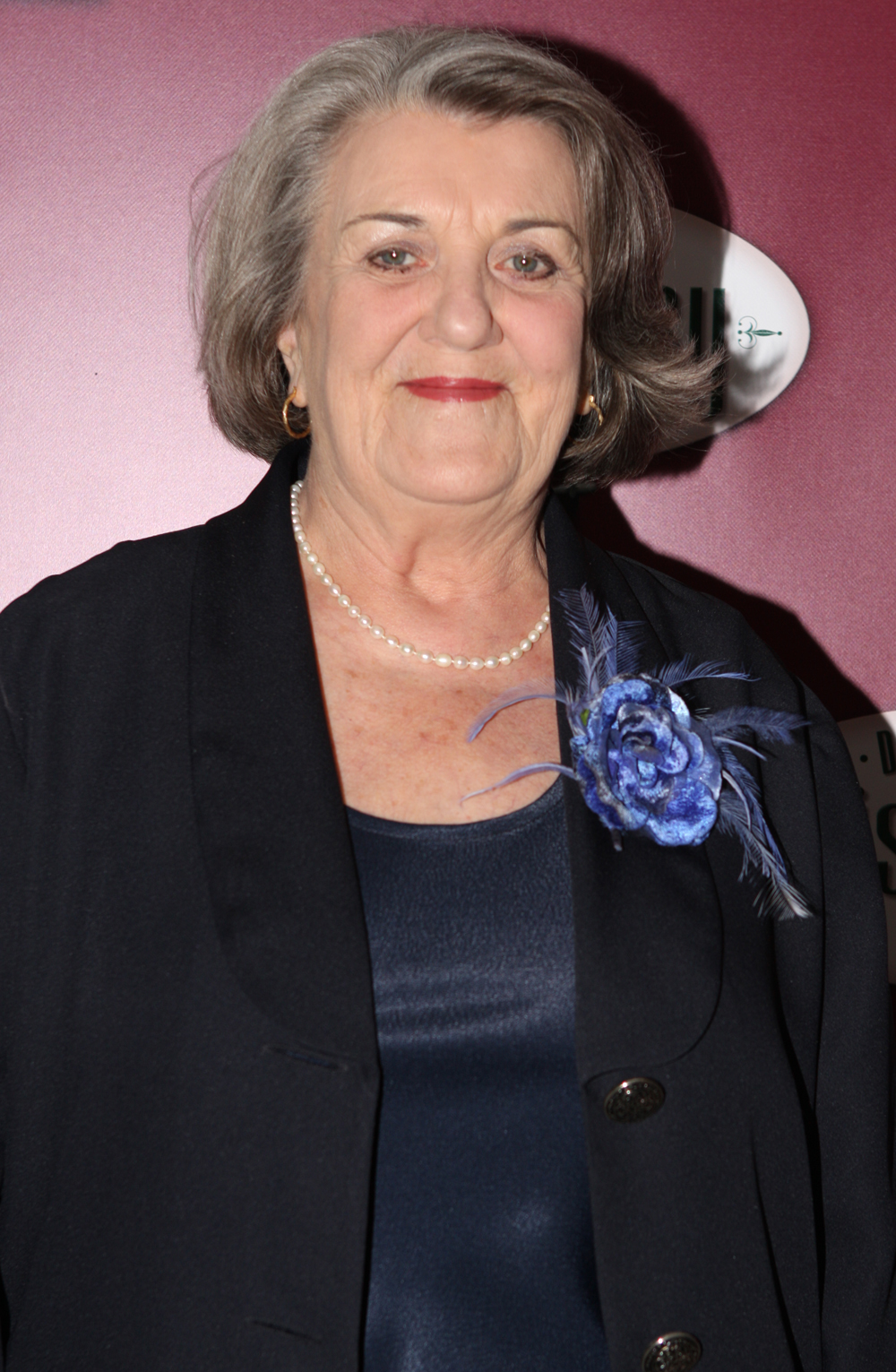
Maggie Kirkpatrick played Vivienne "The Guv" Standish.

Prior to both stints on the serial, Kirkpatrick was best known for her role as prison warder Joan "The Freak" Ferguson on the Australian soap Prisoner: Cell Block H. "It's been 17 years since Prisoner finished and I've not played any role that was remotely like a prison person in all that time," Kirkpatrick said in an Interview with the Sun Herald. "And now here I am back behind bars." She told Scott Ellis about her character, "She's a legal person who's been wrongfully incarcerated, She was a magistrate in the children's court who uncovered in her line of work a pedophile ring - stop me if you heard this before - consisting of judges, lawyers and politicians. When she tried to expose them, they set her up and she's in jail." She then described Viv as "tough" but "brains, not brawn". Kirkpatrick expressed a desire to return to the role; "I'm angling to come back, I'd love them to have me back!".

Viv appears when Dani is incarcerated for running over Kane. She initially intimidates Dani but begins to like her and nicknames her "princess" and feels that she does not belong in prison. After Dani is caught in the middle of an escape attempt, her chances of appeal seem all but lost. However, Viv puts pressure on the real culprits to keep Dani's name out of it and Dani is eventually released. Viv and Dani keep in contact and Dani mentions Felix Walters (Josh Lawson) has been stalking her and making her life hell. Felix is hospitalized after someone hits him over the head with a baseball bat and Dani quickly works out Viv ordered the attack on Felix, which she admits. As a result, her sentence is extended.

Some months later, Viv sends Dani a visiting order but her father, Rhys (Michael Beckley) goes in her place and returns with shocking news, Viv's heart is failing and she is dying. When Dani visits again, Viv tells her she has been working on her autobiography which she wants Dani to publish. Dani takes her up on the offer but the manuscript is destroyed in a kiosk fire caused by Ric Dalby (Mark Furze) and Wazza Stevens (Israel Cannan). After helping reconstruct Viv's notes, Dani campaigns to get Viv an early release on compassionate ground and enlists the help of Morag Bellingham (Cornelia Frances), who is shocked when she recognises Viv's name. It transpires that Viv was in a relationship with Morag's brother, Alf Stewart (Ray Meagher) when they were teenagers and their families disapproved. Alf proposed but Viv never returned. Alf meets up with Viv again and they have an emotional reunion. Morag arranges for Viv to be let out on Day release, where she spends her final hours with Alf and reveals that she had become pregnant with his child and subsequently adopted the baby out to a childless couple, Marion and Marianne Dalby who lived in Yabbie Creek. Alf forgives her and she dies in his arms peacefully. It is soon revealed that Alf and Viv's son was Owen Dalby who later died of a heart attack during a fight with his son, Ric.

== Robbie Hunter ==
Robbie Hunter, played by Jason Smith, made his first on screen appearance on 25 November 2003 and departed on 10 October 2006. Chris Hemsworth originally auditioned for the role of Robbie, but the producers decided that he was not right for the part. They later cast him as Kim Hyde. Smith then won the role of Robbie. Of his casting, the actor told the official Home and Away website "I really enjoyed the audition process because my character is so full of life. If there was any role on television I wanted to play this would be it." Smith felt coming into a well established show with a strong cast was a good opportunity for him. For his portrayal of Robbie, Smith was nominated for "Most Popular New Male Talent" at the 2005 Logie Awards.

== Others ==
Date(s)	Character	Actor	Circumstances
14–24 January	Claire Archer	Mariel McClorey	Clare takes over at the Drop-in centre when Flynn Saunders (Joel McIlroy) goes on holiday with his girlfriend Sally Fletcher (Kate Ritchie). Noah Lawson (Beau Brady) is irritated when she interrupts a conversation between him and Nick Smith (Chris Egan) and assumes Nick's guardian Irene Roberts (Lynne McGranger) is the one abusing him, prompting a full-scale investigation from the Department of Child Services. Claire leaves after mistaking a collapsing diabetic for a junkie.
10 February–5 March	Anna McMahon	Anna Lea Russo	Anna is the editor of Northern District University's campus newspaper. She dates Noah Lawson (Beau Brady) briefly which causes tensions with Hayley Smith (Bec Cartwright), who has broken up with Noah. However, Anna and Noah's relationship quickly fizzles out.
13–17 February	Dr. Garland	Scott Higgins	Garland operates on Alf Stewart (Ray Meagher) following his collapse on the beach as the result of a brain tumour.
5 March–17 April	Trevor Bardwell	Bryan Marshall	Trevor attends TAFE with Irene Roberts (Lynne McGranger). He shows romantic interest in Irene but their relationship struggles to get going and Irene goes on to date Paris Burnett (Rhett Giles).
5 March–15 July	Guy Rossi	Han Kidron	Guy is a reporter from the Coastal news. He is present when Dani Sutherland (Tammin Sursok) does her internship at the paper. He is involved in the story of Angie Russell's (Laurie Foell) dismissal from Summer High and later helps discover the Caravan Park is Heritage listed. When Nick Smith (Chris Egan) is voted out of reality series "The Dorm", he asks him for his side of the story.
7–18 March	Michael Geoffrey	Andrew James	Geoffrey is from the education department. He tells Sally Fletcher (Kate Ritchie) she is too young to be principal to replace the departing Donald Fisher (Norman Coburn) and passes her over in favour of Angie Russell (Laurie Foell) but changes his mind and installs Sally temporarily as principal until Paris Burnett (Rhett Giles) takes over.
25 March–3 April	Stephen Ross	Oliver Ackland	Stephen is an old friend of Dylan Russell (Brett Hicks-Maitland) and attended the same school as Duncan Stewart (Brendan McKensy), where Dylan's mother, Angie (Laurie Foell) taught. It emerges that Angie seduced Stephen in revenge for arguing with Dylan and dumped him. When Nick Smith (Chris Egan) is accused of sexually assaulting Angie, Dylan calls Stephen to testify in Nick's defence against Angie. This backfires when Angie seduces Stephen once more and as a result he lies on the witness stand resulting in Nick being sentenced to community service. Dylan is angry but Stephen continues lying. Angie then pushes Stephen again once more and he leaves town, broken. When Angie is murdered, Rhys Sutherland (Michael Beckley) suggests Stephen could be a suspect but the police reveal he is in a mental hospital after suffering a breakdown.
10–14 April	Mira Sardelic	Hollie Andrew	Mira is Scott Hunter's (Kip Gamblin) wife. Her appearance shocks Scott's girlfriend Dani Sutherland (Tammin Sursok). It is revealed that Scott married Mira while they were in College, to avoid her being deported back to Europe. Despite working through their divorce, Mira still has feelings for Scott but realises he is now in love with Dani. She then tells Dani she is lucky to have Scott and hands Scott back the wedding ring before leaving.
17 April–6 June	Maureen Evans	Sally Cahill	Maureen is the long-lost daughter of Colleen Smart (Lyn Collingwood). She tracks Colleen down after reading about her writing a book. Colleen tells Maureen she was not allowed to hold her after she was born and named her Rosemary (after actress Rosemary Clooney) before giving her up and baked a cake on her birthday for 21 years. Maureen reveals she has two children and is now a grandmother, making Colleen a great-grandmother. Colleen is initially suspicious of Maureen, who she believes wants to cash in on her new found well but they get to know each. After briefly dating Alf Stewart (Ray Meagher), Maureen moves on but agrees to keep in touch with Colleen.
22–29 April	David Brannigan	Richard Healy	Brannigan is one of the investigating detectives on the murder case of Angie Russell (Laurie Foell). He questions potential suspects Rhys Sutherland (Michael Beckley) and Jesse McGregor (Ben Unwin), both former lovers of Angie. When Angie's son, Dylan (Brett Hicks-Maitland) confesses to the murder, Brannigan arrests him.
25–28 April	Monica Markham	Barbara Morton	Monica is the mother of Angie Russell (Laurie Foell). She arrives to comfort her grandson Dylan (Brett Hicks-Maitland) during the aftermath of Angie's death. She becomes upset when the extent of her late daughter's malicious intentions is revealed to her.
6–7 May	Troy	Uncredited	Troy is a drug addict who was being cared for by Noah Lawson (Beau Brady) at the Drop-In Centre. He then suffers a drug overdose and dies.
8 May–1 October	Amber	Sibylla Deen	Amber is a member of the local girls' soccer team coached by Alex Poulos (Danny Raco).
14 May–5 September 2003, 4–5 July 2005, 7–25 April 2022	Dimitri Poulos	Salvatore Coco	Dimitri is Leah Patterson's (Ada Nicodemou) eldest brother. He arrives for their younger brother Alex's (Danny Raco) 21st birthday celebrations. When Dimitri discovers Leah's relationship with Jesse McGregor (Ben Unwin), he blames Alex for being unable to protect Leah, sparking a huge argument at Alex's party, resulting in their father Theo (Silvio Ofria) suffering a heart attack. Dimitri next appears at Leah's wedding to Dan Baker (Tim Campbell). Years later, Dimitri's son Theo Poulos moves to the Bay to live with Leah, after Dimitri throws him out.
23–24 June	David Simpson	Aristos Athos; Piper Ferguson; Eli Ferguson	David is the son of Sophie Simpson (Rebekah Elmaloglou) and Blake Dean (Les Hill). He is born during Sally Fletcher's (Kate Ritchie) hen night and named after David Croft (Guy Pearce), a former boyfriend of Sophie's and the father of his half-sister, Tamara (Sophie Luck).
1 July–24 November	Pia Corelli	Bianca Biasi	Pia is a police officer. She arrests Alf Stewart (Ray Meagher) for driving with an expired license, arrests Jesse McGregor (Ben Unwin) when he attempts to return a car Nick Smith (Chris Egan). She also investigates the scene of Dani Sutherland's (Tammin Sursok) hit-and-run on Kane Phillips (Sam Atwell). She suspects Jesse of steroid possession but discovers that Baz Fulsome (Stuart Fenton) is the real culprit.
4–9 July	Courtney	Emily Sexton	Courtney is a contestant on The Dorm, a reality television show, alongside Nick Smith (Chris Egan). When Nick discovers she is a plant who the produces invited to create drama for the show, Courtney climbs into bed with him to silence him which is edited to make Nick look bad, resulting in Jade Sutherland (Kate Garven) voting him off the show.
4–9 July	Damien	Simon Mullard	Damien is a contestant on The Dorm who takes an instant dislike to Nick Smith (Chris Egan).
11 July 2003 – 10 September 2004	Andrew Hilton	James Camden	Andrew is a student at Summer Bay High.
11 July–17 November	Eloise Lennox	Suzanne McEachern	Eloise enrolls at Summer Bay High and befriends Max Sutherland (Sebastian Elmaloglou), who falls for her. Max is devastated when he learns she is dying of Leukaemia and only has several months to live and sets about trying to fulfil her dying wishes. After a pleasant day out Eloise dies in Max's arms when they return home in a limo.
11 July–3 October	Mr. Lennox	Christopher Burken	Mr. Lennox is the father of Eloise Lennox (Suzanne McEachern). He enrols his daughter at the school and later attends a meal at Summer Bay House arranged by Max Sutherland (Sebastian Elmaloglou).
6 August–15 October	Ross McLuhan	Angelo D'Angelo	Ross is Dani Sutherland's (Tammin Sursok) communications lecturer at Northern Districts University. He takes a personal interest in Dani much to her disgust. Dani complains to Vivian Corbett, the student body head about Ross overstepping her boundaries but she soon discovers she is Ross' wife. Ross comforts Dani when she goes through a testing time and they share a kiss, which leaves Dani feeling distraught, resulting in her running over Kane Phillips (Sam Atwell). Ross arrives the following day telling Dani he has left Vivian for her but she rejects him. He is last seen sneaking into a lecture, avoiding Dani's gaze.
5 September 2003 – 30 June 2004	Norman Shadbolt	David Whitford	Norman owns a book shop and attends the launch of a book written by Max Sutherland (Sebastian Elmaloglou). He takes an instant liking to Colleen Smart (Lyn Collingwood), who assumes Max set her up with him. However, they begin dating and attend the end of Year dance at the Surf Club. The relationship comes to a halt when Colleen finds out about a Mrs. Shadbolt (Julie Herbert) who she assumes is Norman's wife, but he explains she is his elderly mother who is suffering from Alzheimer's. They soon become engaged but Norman calls it off by leaving a letter for Colleen at the wedding of Hayley Smith (Bec Cartwright) and Noah Lawson (Beau Brady).
11 September 2003 – 10 August 2005	Gary Rogers	Leigh Martin	Gary is the president of the P&C committee at Summer Bay High. He is unimpressed when Tasha Andrews (Isabel Lucas) is still allowed to attend school after assaulting a teacher and supports incoming principal Barry Hyde (Ivar Kants) and his stricter regime. He clashes with Beth Hunter (Clarissa House) and taunts her about her daughter Kit's (Amy Mizzi) alcoholism, however the committee impeach him and vote Beth as president. Gary's ire is provoked when he learns his daughter Jane is part of a lock-in led by Jade Sutherland. Gary is also vocal at town meetings in the Surf Club over the police's mishandling of Sarah Lewis (Luisa Hastings-Edge) and supports Harry Chambers in his crusade against Jack Holden) (Paul O'Brien) who killed his daughter in a police shootout.
19 September–21 October	Toby Clark	Richard Kessell	Toby is the cleaner of Summer Bay High who begins a short relationship with Jade Sutherland (Kate Garven). When Toby is evasive about his family life, Jade and her sister, Kirsty Sutherland (Christie Hayes) do some investigating and visit his family's farm. Jade then learns that Toby has been lying about his orphaned status due to being ashamed of his family and promptly dumps him.
24 September 2003 – 22 November 2012	Gloria Clayton	Maria Matteo	Gloria is a nurse at Northern Districts hospital. She is frequently seen in scenes with fellow nurse Julie Cooper (Lisa Hayson-Phillips). Her first emergency is to tend to Kane Phillips (Sam Atwell) after he is run over by Dani Sutherland (Tammin Sursok).
24 September	Mrs Lennox	Bernadette Cogin	Mrs Lennox is the mother of Eloise Lennox (Suzanne McEachern). She and her husband attend a meal arranged by Max Sutherland (Sebastian Elmaloglou).
2–15 October	Baz Fulsome	Stuart Fenton	Baz is a drug dealer who peddles steroids at the surf club gym. He supplies Alex Poulos (Danny Raco) and is violently ejected by Jesse McGregor (Ben Unwin). Baz is then hired to by Josh West (Daniel Collopy) to plant some drugs in Jesse's drawer at the gym, leaving him as suspect. However, Baz confesses and Jesse is cleared.
8 October 2003 – 3 May 2004	The Dean	Philip Holder	The Dean of Northern Districts University in Yabbie Creek. He accuses Noah Lawson (Beau Brady) of plagiarism but discovers Kevin Bull (Garth Halcombe) is the real culprit. The Dean is later attacked by Dani Sutherland (Tammin Sursok) when she mistakes him for her stalker Felix Walters (Josh Lawson) and promptly suspends her.
9 October	Jack Hunter	Ian Lind	Jack is the late husband of Beth Hunter (Clarissa House) and the father of their five children, Scott (Kip Gamblin), Kit (Amy Mizzi), Robbie (Jason Smith), Henry (Tobi Atkins) and Matilda (Indiana Evans). He appears as vision to Kit when the family visit the old family farm where he is buried.
13 October	Matt Owen	David Francis	Matt is a drifter who helps Seb Miller (Mitch Firth) fix Noah Lawson's (Beau Brady) motorcycle. He steals the bike and Seb's wallet and is killed by a truck, prompting many people to think Seb is the one who has died when the wallet is found on his person. Seb however, is found alive and unhurt.
21 October	Mr. Clark	Andrew Hunter	Toby Clark's (Richard Kessell) estranged family. They appear when Jade Sutherland (Kate Garven) and her sister Kirsty (Christie Hayes) visit them at their house.
21 October	Mrs. Clark	Trudi-Ann Tierney	Toby Clark's (Richard Kessell) estranged family. They appear when Jade Sutherland (Kate Garven) and her sister Kirsty (Christie Hayes) visit them at their house.
21 October	Jimmy Clark	Will Blackney	Toby Clark's (Richard Kessell) estranged family. They appear when Jade Sutherland (Kate Garven) and her sister Kirsty (Christie Hayes) visit them at their house.
21 October	Toby's Sister	Amy Blackney	Toby Clark's (Richard Kessell) estranged family. They appear when Jade Sutherland (Kate Garven) and her sister Kirsty (Christie Hayes) visit them at their house.
22 October 2003–11 June 2004	David Callahan	Felix Williamson; Nicholas Cassim	David is the fiancé of Shelley Sutherland (Paula Forrest), he represents her daughter Dani (Tammin Sursok) when she goes to trial for running over Kane Phillips (Sam Atwell) but is unsuccessful. When Shelley returns to Summer Bay to donate a kidney to her other daughter, Kirsty (Christie Hayes), David is revealed to have an irrational fear of scars (which the procedure would leave) and he breaks up with Shelley as a result.
29–31 October	Mr. Robertson	Danny Adcock	Robertson is the prosecutor at Dani Sutherland's (Tammin Sursok) trial for the attempted murder of Kane Phillips (Sam Atwell). He ruthlessly cross-examines Dani and goads her into admitting she wanted Kane dead, which results in the jury rendering a guilty verdict.
