= Mitch McColl =

- Home and Away character
- Cameron Welsh as Mitch McColl
- Portrayed by: Cameron Welsh (1999–2005); Mitchell McMahon (2000)
- Duration: 1999–2001, 2005
- First appearance: 15 July 1999
- Last appearance: 8 July 2005
- Introduced by: John Holmes (1999); Julie McGuaran (2005)
In-universe information
- Occupation: Student
- Mother: Vicky McColl
- Stepfather: Rod Branson
- Uncles: Morrie Sanders

Mitchell McColl is a fictional character from the Australian Channel Seven soap opera Home and Away, originally played by Cameron Welsh. He debuted on-screen during the episode airing on 15 July 1999. Welsh thought that the role of Mitch would be a guest part, but producers soon signed him onto a three-year contract. Welsh was diagnosed with an herniated disc and took a break from filming in 2000. Mitchell McMahon took over the role temporarily when producers decided that Mitch needed to remain part of a "big storyline". Welsh decided to leave Home and Away in November 2000 and Mitch departed on 9 March 2001. Welsh reprised the role in 2005 for the serial's 4000th episode. Mitch has been described as a "bad boy with a heart of gold" and likes to help people out. He is also "emotionally scarred and guarded" due to his upbringing.

== Character development ==
Actor Cameron Welsh auditioned for a part in Home and Away with the predicate that it would only be a guest role. Welsh was originally signed a three-year contract to appear in Home and Away. He began filming in May 1999 and his character Mitch debuted on-screen during the episode airing on 15 July. Welsh said that he viewed it as a "great opportunity" to learn the "technical aspect of acting".

Mitch was initially described as a "motherless 16-year-old bad boy with a heart of gold" and "emotionally scarred and guarded". Welsh was given a "very clear starting point" with Mitch and he knew that he would develop well in the years that followed. Welsh said that playing Mitch was "weird" because he had to get into the mindset of a sixteen-year-old. Welsh looked older than his character, he said it worked well for Mitch because "he's seen a lot for his age, he's had a turbulent childhood, so it's okay to play him a lot wiser than the average kid." Welsh later described Mitch as always being "a good guy with an interest in helping people out". Welsh enjoyed playing the guitar, so producers decided to incorporate this into Mitch's character. Prior to Mitch's arrival media sources it was reported that he would become attracted to the character of Hayley Smith (Bec Cartwright). Welsh said that because Mitch is a romantic "he was in town for all of five seconds before he caught a glimpse of Hayley." He opined that the two characters shared chemistry and said that viewers could expect "a few more sparks" between them.

In 2000, Welsh was diagnosed with a herniated disc in his back and was ordered to take bed rest. Producers granted Welsh a six-week break but decided to hire Mitchell McMahon to play Mitch in his absence. Welsh said it felt "weird" seeing another actor playing Mitch but as he was involved in a "big storyline" at the time, producers were left with no other option. Welsh said that McMahon looked different to him and had a different way of playing Mitch and said "it will be interesting to see how viewers react". After his return, Welsh's scenes as Mitch started airing once again from 3 April 2000.

Mitch was often used in "romantic" scenes and characterised as "a nice guy". Welsh said "I guess it's not the worst thing in the world to get down pat." In 2001, Welsh left Home and Away, Mitch's exit storyline was not dramatic as he left to visit his ill grandmother in New Zealand.

In 2005, Welsh filmed a cameo for the serial's 4000th episode, which saw Mitch return for Alf Stewart's (Ray Meagher) birthday. Welsh later became Home and Away's producer. He said that playing Mitch helped give him a better understanding when it came to producing the serial.

== Storylines ==
Mitch arrives in Summer Bay and hides out on Travis Nash's (Nic Testoni) boat. It is soon revealed that Mitch is a runaway who fled home after his stepfather, Rod Branson (Russell Newman) blamed him for causing his mother's death by accidentally hitting her in the chest with a cricket ball. Mitch is then fostered by Alf and Ailsa Stewart (Judy Nunn) and quickly becomes a big brother figure to their son, Duncan (Brendan McKensy). Mitch is accepted into the local high school and makes friends with Hayley, Will (Zac Drayson), Gypsy Nash (Kimberley Cooper), Peta Janossi (Aleetza Wood) and Edward Dunglass (Stephen James King).

Mitch is attracted to Hayley and she is attracted to him but she is dating Sam Marshall (Ryan Clark). Mitch dates Gypsy instead and sleeps with her. After Hayley and Sam break up, Mitch gets together with Hayley but they briefly separate when she learns that he lied about Gypsy. They reconcile when Mitch confronts Hayley's employer Brian Rogers (Gerry Tacovsky) sets about making inappropriate advances towards her.

One morning, Mitch finds the body of Sarah McKay, a teenage girl who had run away and drowned while sleeping in a storm drain. After realising he could have easily suffered the same fate as Sarah, Mitch is compelled to set up a Drop-in Centre. His idea comes to fruition after his friends and the local adults battle the council for permission and name the centre after Sarah, whose [parents attend the grand opening. When the centre is up and running, Mitch feels a little annoyed when the newly arrived Shelley Sutherland (Paula Forrest) and Gypsy begin running the centre but eventually relents. Brodie Hanson (Susie Rugg) begins staying at the centre after fleeing her abusive mother, Jan (Genevieve Sulway) and Mitch forms a close friendship with her. Hayley is annoyed when she finds Mitch is dating Brodie, as she hoped to reconcile with him as they had broken up after her father Ken (Anthony Phelan) died.

After Mitch wins a charity talent contest with a self-composed musical number, he is approached by Morrie Sanders (Peter Brownie), who reveals he is his uncle and explains that Mitch's grandfather had thrown Vicky out of home when he learned she was going to marry Mitch's father. Morrie tells Mitch that his grandmother, Morrie and Vicky's mother is dying and wants to see him before she dies and Mitch agrees to go to New Zealand with Morrie. When Mitch returns to the Bay, he feels he has changed and his relationship with Alf in the wake of Ailsa's death sours. He then moves in with Gypsy and Vinnie Patterson (Ryan Kwanten). Mitch then decides to leave for New Zealand permanently and before leaving reconciles with Alf and shares an emotional farewell with Brodie.

Four years later, Mitch returns to Summer Bay briefly for Alf’s 60th birthday party. Whilst his part in the events was minimal, a deleted scene revealed that he was a music teacher at a high school and was engaged to a woman named Kylie.

== Reception ==
For his portrayal of Mitch, Welsh was nominated for the "Best New Male Talent" Logie Award in 2000. James Joyce of The Newcastle Herald said that Mitch made a big impact in his first episode on-screen. He later opined that Mitch and Hayley's first kiss was "long-awaited" and had that the pair had "lustful eyes" for one another. When they face "frustration" after the kiss, he added that fans "crave this sort of teasing". A columnist for the Daily Record chose Mitch's exit as one of their TV highlights of the week.
