= Nick Smith (Home and Away) =

Fictional character in the Australian soap opera Home and Away

- Home and Away character
- Chris Egan as Nick Smith
- Portrayed by: Matt Juarez (1999); Chris Egan (2000–03); Aaron Puckeridge (2003 flashback)
- Duration: 1999–2003
- First appearance: 18 March 1999
- Last appearance: 12 September 2003
- Introduced by: John Holmes
- Spin-off appearances: Home and Away: Secrets and the City
In-universe information
- Occupation: Student; Actor
- Father: Ken Smith
- Mother: Eve Smith
- Brothers: Will Smith
- Sisters: Hayley Smith
- Nephews: Noah Smith
- Nieces: Lily Smith

Nicholas Smith is a fictional character in the Australian soap opera Home and Away. He first appeared during the episode airing on 18 March 1999, played by Matt Juarez in a guest role and then returned as a regular character on 26 April 2000, now played by Chris Egan, and departed on 12 September 2003. Aaron Puckeridge also played Nick in flashbacks in 2003.

== Casting ==
In a live chat session on the official Home and Away website, Egan answered several questions from fans. He spoke of his experiences of being cast as Nick. "It's great, I have a lot of fun, it's like a big family, I learn a lot from them." When asked about working with co-star Kate Garven, who played Jade Sutherland, Egan said "She's great, we have a lot of fun together, a lot of fun playing boyfriend and girlfriend, hard not to have a laugh between scenes. We have a lot of fun." Egan also praised co-stars Brett Hicks-Maitland and Zac Drayson, who plays Nick's on-screen brother, Will. Egan stated he would like to appear in films after leaving the serial and mentioned that filming overseas in London and shooting scenes for Home and Away video spinoff Home and Away: Secrets and the City were among his favourite experiences.

== Storylines ==
Nick is the younger brother of Will (Zac Drayson) and Hayley Smith (Bec Cartwright). Like Hayley, he was taken into care and showed little interest in Will's plan for them all to settle in Summer Bay, choosing to stay with foster parents even after Hayley had gone to join Will.

Nick is first seen when he is fleeing from Johnno, a drug dealer and the leader of a biker gang, whom he owes a large sum of money to. Nick runs to get help from his siblings and is beaten up by Johnno, who considers the debt paid. Nick's foster parents are initially reluctant to take him back following the revelation but after Will and Hayley coax them, Nick returns home. Nick's father Ken (Anthony Phelan) returns after fighting an alcohol problem, he petitions for Nick to return home to reunite the family. Nick is not very keen on the idea. He meets Irene Roberts (Lynne McGranger), Will and Hayley's foster mother and Ken's new partner. He feels that Ken is trying to replace his mother Eve (Robyn Gibbes) and Nick is upset further when he learns Ken and Irene are to be engaged after Ken proposes.

Nick soon befriends Duncan Stewart (Brendan McKensy) and they begin causing havoc together. When Nick is accused of throwing stones at Duncan's aunt, Celia (Fiona Spence), they get into a fight but later reconcile their friendship and focus their attentions on the newly arrived Sutherland twins Jade (Kate Garven) and Kirsty (Christie Hayes), who are in their year at school. Duncan dates Jade while Nick dates Kirsty.

After Nick saves Irene from being attacked by Eve, who has since left a mental hospital, he gives her and Ken his blessing. Ken is later killed when a car he is working on crushes him, leaving Nick and the family devastated. Nick feels isolated and things are not helped when Irene becomes distant and Will takes an authoritarian role. He becomes worried that Irene will not want him, Will and Hayley now Ken has died but she reassures him otherwise.

When Nick runs away one night and he hides out at Ken's garage, which is about to be sold and destroyed, he is visited his father in a dream who tells him that the garage would probably have had to close due to its location and if he returned home, everything would work out. Nick wakes up and returns home to reconcile. Nick's friendship with Duncan comes to an end when Duncan's bad behaviour spirals out of control. Nick soon becomes closer to Jade and she feels the same but rejects him when he offers to break up with Kirsty to be with her as she feels it will damage her own relationship with he sister. Kirsty, however, ends things first as she has feelings for Seb Miller (Mitch Firth). Nick briefly dates Simone Harris but it fizzles out when Simone insults Jade. After Nick returns from a visit to London, he and Jade finally get together.

When Will asks Nick to be his best man at his wedding to Gypsy Nash (Kimberley Cooper), he is pleased but panics when he realises he has lost the ring. In order to fund a replacement, he sells his games console and is annoyed when it emerges Will has taken the ring to have engraved. Will suggests that Nick gives the replacement ring to Jade. Shortly after Will and Gypsy leave, Nick clashes with Irene's son Nathan Roberts (Craig Ball) who has recently been released from prison. During a Year 10 class trip, The bus crashes and Nick is left with his legs trapped. Nathan assists the search party in rescuing the passengers and is able to save them before the bus explodes into flames.

Following the death of local doctor, Charlotte Adams (Stephanie Chaves-Jacobsen), Nick finds Jade's phase of Living for the moment hard to take and is somewhat reluctant when she seems to want to elevate their relationship to a more physical level. Nick then gently informs her he is not ready for that step.

Angie Russell (Laurie Foell), the new deputy principal at Summer Bay High begins playing mind games after Nick is found arguing with her son, Dylan. She begins flirting with Nick, causing him to obsess over her. Nick's behaviour becomes erratic when he tries to get Jade to take suggestive photos of herself. Social services are called and Irene is initially accused of abusing Nick. When Nick stands up to Angie one day in class, she begins tearing at her clothes and screaming, claiming that Nick has sexually assaulted her. Nick is then charged and vilified in town. Nick flees and hides out on a hippy farm where Jade finds him high on "magic mushrooms", and she is only just able to get him to attend court. In spite of Dylan's testimony, Nick is found guilty and expelled from Summer Bay High. Nick then begins community service at a retirement home and is forced to attend Yabbie Creek High. Jade, Kirsty and Seb work together on a video which exposes Angie's behaviour and she is fired by Principal Paris Burnett (Rhett Giles) and Nick is reinstated. Several weeks later, Angie is killed and many people, including Nick and the Sutherlands are in the frame for murder. It is later revealed Dylan killed Angie.

Nick auditions for "The Dorm", a reality television show and is successful. Nick quickly discovers that one of the other contestants, Courtney (Emily Sexton), is a plant aiming to cause trouble. Courtney climbs into bed to silence Nick but the sequence is edited to make it look like they have slept together. Jade sees the footage and begins making multiple phone calls in order to vote Nick out of the show and he returns home in disgrace. Nick tells his side of the story in a newspaper interview but has a hard time convincing people that he was the innocent party. After learning of Irene's relationship with Paris, Nick steals a car and tries to leave town. Jesse McGregor (Ben Unwin) catches him but is arrested for the crime himself. He confesses once Jesse is facing a return to prison. A major American producer offers Nick a role in a film and he accepts. Nick leaves for Los Angeles after a last gathering of family and friends at the diner.

== Reception ==
For his portrayal of Nick, Egan was nominated for "Best New Male Talent" at the Logie Awards in 2001.
