= List of Home and Away characters introduced in 2000 =

Home and Away is an Australian soap opera. The following is a list of characters that first appeared in 2000, by order of appearance. They were all introduced by the show's executive producer John Holmes. The 13th season of Home and Away began airing on the Seven Network on 31 January 2000. The first introduction of the year was Leah Poulos, played by Ada Nicodemou in March. In May, Spencer McLaren arrived as Kieran Fletcher, a love interest for established character Sally Fletcher (Kate Ritchie). The following month saw the arrival of a new family, the Sutherlands consisting of Rhys, Shelley and their three daughters, Dani, Kirsty and Jade. Rowena Wallace arrived as June, the mother of established character Harry Reynolds. Susie Rugg debuted as Brodie Hanson in July. Beau Brady joined the cast as Noah Lawson in September. Ben Steel began playing Noah's older brother, Jude in October.

== Opening titles cast timeline ==
Color key
Main cast (opening credits)
Recurring guest star (closing credits in 3+ episodes)
Guest star (closing credits in 1–2 episodes)

Character	Actor	2000				
Character	Actor	2756–2805	2806–2835	2836–2875	2876–2930	2931–2960
Sally Fletcher	Kate Ritchie	M	M	M	M	M
Ailsa Stewart	Judy Nunn	M	M	M	M	M
Alf Stewart	Ray Meagher	M	M	M	M	M
Donald Fisher	Norman Coburn	M	M	M	M	M
Sam Marshall	Ryan Clark	M	M		R	R
Irene Roberts	Lynne McGranger	M	M	M	M	M
Justine Welles	Bree Desborough	M				
Vinnie Patterson	Ryan Kwanten	M	M	M	M	M
Joel Nash	David E. Woodley	M	M	M	M	
Natalie Nash	Antoinette Byron	M	M		R	
Gypsy Nash	Kimberley Cooper	M	M	M	M	M
Will Smith	Zac Drayson	M	M	M	M	M
Tom Nash	Graeme Squires	M	M			
Hayley Smith	Rebecca Cartwright	M	M	M	M	M
James Fraser	Michael Piccirilli	M				
Duncan Stewart	Brendan McKensy	M	M	M	M	M
Peta Janossi	Aleetza Wood	M	M	M		
Mitch McColl	Cameron Welsh	M	M	M	M	M
Harry Reynolds	Justin Melvey	M	M	M	M	M
Shauna Bradley	Kylie Watson	M	M	M	M	M
Edward Dunglass	Stephen James King	M	M	M		
Judith Ackroyd	Anna Hruby	M	M	M	M	M
Ken Smith	Anthony Phelan	R	M	M	R	G
Colleen Smart	Lyn Collingwood	R	M	M	M	M
Nick Smith	Christopher Egan		R	M	M	M
Leah Poulos	Ada Nicodemou	R	R	M	M	M
Shelley Sutherland	Paula Forrest			R	M	M
Rhys Sutherland	Michael Beckley			R	M	M
Dani Sutherland	Tammin Sursok			R	M	M
Kirsty Sutherland	Christie Hayes			R	M	M
Jade Sutherland	Kate Garven			R	M	M

== Leah Poulos ==
Leah Poulos, played by Ada Nicodemou, made her first appearance on 22 March 2000. Nicodemou was approached by the producers to join the cast and offered a six-month contract. She began filming in November 1999, and was soon offered a contract extension. Yahoo!7 describe Leah as "a single mother who has a strong work ethic and stands up for what she believes in." "Leah has a confidence about her that makes her shine. She's easy going and fun loving." Nicodemou has received several award nominations for her performance as Leah. She was nominated for the Gold Logie Award for Most Popular Personality on Australian Television at the 2001, 2002 and 2006 Logie Awards, and also received "Most Popular Actress" nominations in 2002 and 2006. She was nominated for the "Best Actress" award at the 2009 Inside Soap Awards. At the 2010 and 2011 ceremonies she was nominated in the category of "Best Daytime Star".

== Kieran Fletcher ==
Kieran Fletcher
- Home and Away character
- Portrayed by: Spencer McLaren
- First appearance: 10 May 2000
- Last appearance: 15 June 2000
- Introduced by: John Holmes

Kieran Fletcher, played by Spencer McLaren made his first appearance in May 2000 and departed on 15 June 2000. Kieran was one of McLaren's first roles after graduating from NIDA in 1999.

Kieran meets Sally Fletcher (Kate Ritchie) while on an archaeological holiday in Ireland and they return to Summer Bay and announce their engagement much to the shock of Sally's friends. Kieran begins flirting with Gypsy Nash (Kimberley Cooper) who rejects his advances and threatens to expose his behaviour to Sally. However, Kieran tells Gypsy given her reputation, no-one will believe her. On the day of the wedding, Gypsy objects during vows and confesses to Kieran trying to make a move on her. Sally refuses to believe her at first but Hayley Smith (Bec Cartwright) and Colleen Smart (Lyn Collingwood) verify her story as they both witnessed Kieran grab Gypsy several times. Sally, upset, demands the truth and runs out of the church and the wedding is called off. Steven Matheson (Adam Willits), Sally's foster brother confronts Kieran on the beach and beats him up. He leaves soon after.

== Jade Sutherland ==
Jade Sutherland, played by Kate Garven, made her first appearance on 19 June 2000. Jade was Garven's first role on television. Garven said that working on Home and Away was a fun experience and that she had developed a good working relationship with those who play her on-screen family. Jade is portrayed as the "quieter" and "dreamy" of the Sutherland sisters, a keen book reader who likes to help out those less fortunate than herself. Jade is prone to illness and is a long sufferer of asthma. Jade's family see her as "fragile" and "vulnerable" and feel the need to treat her with care. The serial's official website describe her as being "stronger that many people realise" despite her fragile nature. Garven described Jade stating that "she is a nice person and a very sweet girl." In Philip Ardagh's book of howlers, blunders and random mistakery, Ardagh claimed that Jade and Kirsty's "amazing telepathic empathy" was conveniently forgotten by scriptwriters when they were revealed to be unrelated. He added that it must have been a "surprise" to viewers who had previously seen their connection play out. A columnist for the Sunday Mail thought the plot was questionable and said "A family arrive and claim Jade was swapped at birth with their daughter. You couldn't make it up."

== Dani Sutherland ==
Dani Sutherland, played by Tammin Sursok, made her first appearance on 19 June 2000. The actress successfully auditioned for the role of Dani in 1999 and she called the experience "incredible". After four years in the role, Sursok decided to leave Home and Away to pursue a music career and other acting opportunities Sursok later revealed that her frustration with the soap's producers also contributed to her exit. She later explained that she had also become frustrated with the serial's producers. Sursok was glad that her character was written out of the show without anything bad happening to her. For her portrayal of Dani, Sursok won the Most Popular New Female Talent Logie Award in 2001. Three years later, she was nominated for the Most Popular Actress Logie. Linda Barnier of the Newcastle Herald branded Dani "unlucky-in-love", while The Sydney Morning Herald's Robin Oliver called her "a go-getter".

== Kirsty Sutherland ==
Kirsty Sutherland, played by Christie Hayes, made her first appearance on 19 June 2000. Hayes auditioned for the role when she was thirteen years old and secured it. In 2008 it was revealed that Hayes was returning to the serial and likened it to returning home when she stated: "It felt like coming home after I had moved out already, everything changed but was really still the same, it was refreshing and exciting." Hayes decided to leave the serial again the following year and filmed her final scenes in August. She cited that the time felt right, but added she was happy she had come back for the time she had. The Armidale Express commented on Kirsty's relationship with Kane stating: "The Romeo and Juliet love story between Kane and love interest Kirsty (played by Christie Hayes) still remains one of the greatest (if not most controversial) Home And Away love stories." Soap opera coverage website Holy Soap branded her final episode as a real tear jerker. Holy soap also brand her wedding to Kane as "bizarre" because of the double wedding and stated "it's little wonder" that the pair had a private wedding.

== Rhys Sutherland ==
Rhys Sutherland, played by actor Michael Beckley, made his first appearance on 19 June 2000. Beckley spent twenty years as a theatre actor before he joined Home and Away. He told Joanne McCarthy of the Newcastle Herald that he had asked his agent to find him a television role as he wanted "some stability". Rhys is the patriarch of the five-strong Sutherland family, who take over running the Summer Bay Caravan Park. Rhys is a former football player who has "a habit of losing his temper". Beckley liked that the family were not connected to any of the show's established characters, as he believed it would allow for new story directions and "all sorts of possibilities for the show."

== Shelley Sutherland ==
Shelley Sutherland, played by actress Paula Forrest, made her first appearance on 19 June 2000. Shelley and her husband Rhys Sutherland (Michael Beckley) take over the local Caravan Park. With Rhys having a temper, Shelley is always ready to step in and "smooth things over." The character made sporadic returns in 2003 and 2004. Forrest made a brief return to the serial in 2009 in order to facilitate her on-screen daughter, Kirsty's (Christie Hayes) departure.

== June Reynolds ==
June Reynolds
- Home and Away character
- Portrayed by: Rowena Wallace
- Duration: 2000–2003
- First appearance: 29 June 2000
- Last appearance: 28 February 2003
- Introduced by: John Holmes
In-universe information
- Brothers: Des
- Husband: Frank Reynolds; Donald Fisher (2003–2007)
- Sons: Harry Reynolds

June Reynolds, portrayed by actress Rowena Wallace, made her first appearance on 29 June 2000. and made her final appearance on 28 February 2003.

June is the mother of Harry Reynolds (Justin Melvey). She arrives in the Bay to stay with Harry and his landlord Donald Fisher (Norman Coburn) and her direct nature manages to annoy several residents. June prepares to leave but Donald convinces her to stay and he admits that he is envious of her skill as a writer and June tells him he has the better imagination and he should get his book "Letter to Byron" published. Harry confronts June over the content of her autobiography, which paints his late father, Frank in a bad light. After a heated conversation, Harry and June reconcile before she leaves. June returns to the bay several months later when Harry decides to leave for the Whitsundays after burning his bridges in Summer Bay and they leave in a seaplane.

On June's next visit to the bay, she rekindles her relationship with Donald and they grow closer together and she helps organise the school's Rock Eisteddfod. It is soon revealed June is a kleptomaniac when she is caught on camera stealing Alex Poulos' (Danny Raco) watch at VJ Patterson's christening. When money disappears from the Diner, June is accused and overhears Donald doubting her innocence. She is cleared but leaves Summer Bay hurt. On Donald's final day as principal of Summer Bay High, June makes a surprise return and they leave for the Whitsundays together and later marry. In 2007, Donald returns and confirms he and June have since divorced.

== Brodie Hanson ==
Brodie Hanson, played by Susie Rugg, made her first appearance on 20 July 2000. In 2004, Andrew Fraser from Inside Soap revealed that when Brodie returns she would be involved in a "sizzling love triangle" and a dramatic car crash. Sacha Molitorisz of The Sydney Morning Herald said that the episode featuring Brodie and Hayley's car crash was better suited to "die hard fans". They criticised the plot for being "unengaging" and opined that the music, performances and dialogue were "painful" and "patchy". They also stated "The problem is, simply piling one melodrama on top of another will not of itself make for good TV. The characters need to be explored, too. Otherwise the result will be superficial."

== Noah Lawson ==
Noah Lawson, played by Beau Brady, made his first appearance on 6 September 2000. Jacqueline Maley writing for The Sydney Morning Herald refers to Noah as a "bad boy" type character. For his portrayal of Noah, Brady was nominated for the "Most Popular New Male Talent" Logie in 2001. He was also nominated for the Silver Logie for "Most Popular Actor" for three years in a row from 2003 to 2005. The episode featuring Noah's funeral won writer Louise Crane-Bowes an Australian Writers Guild award in 2005. The episode featuring Noah's appearance as a ghost to say goodbye to Hayley also earned a nomination in this category in the same year.

== Jude Lawson ==
Jude Lawson, played by Ben Steel, made his first appearance on 30 October 2000 and departed on 12 September 2002. For his portrayal of Jude, Steel was nominated for the "Best New Male Talent" Logie Award in 2001.

== Others ==
Date(s)	Character	Actor	Circumstances
11–16 February	Liang	Merci Chambers	Liang is a Chinese refugee who is brought to Australia illegally. She hides in the Bayside diner and is discovered by Duncan Stewart (Brendan McKensy) who hides her. When a typhoid fever scare is reported and the authorities begin looking for Liang, she runs away. Lance Smart (Peter Vroom) finds her and she is taken to hospital and found to be suffering from malaria, not typhoid. Liang is then returned to China.
16 February – 11 March 2003	Debbie Smart	Kelly Butler	Debbie is married to Lance Smart (Peter Vroom). She arrives in Summer Bay and meets Lance's mother, Colleen (Lyn Collingwood). Colleen tries to keep Debbie away from Lance but is unsuccessful and she and Debbie argue. During the argument, Colleen suffers a fit and Debbie accuses her of faking but she is not. Debbie announces she is pregnant and makes her peace with Colleen before returning to Townsville with Lance. The following year, Debbie returns when Lance walks out on her taking their daughter, Maggie to visit Colleen in the bay and they quickly patch up their marriage. Debbie is next seen when she and Lance visit following the launch of a book Colleen releases but soon discover she did not write it and leave again.
22 February, 25–26 May	Eve Smith	Alex Jones (flashback); Robyn Gibbes	Eve is the ex-wife of Ken Smith (Anthony Phelan) and mother of their children, Will (Zac Drayson), Hayley (Bec Cartwright) and Nick (Chris Egan). She first appears in one of Will's nightmare flashbacks to his childhood. Eve escapes a mental institution and menaces Irene Roberts (Lynne McGranger), her children's foster mother and Ken's fiancé. She corners Irene with a cricket bat and accuses her of trying to steal her family and is about to attack until Nick saves Irene. Eve then flees and hides out in a n old house where she is found by the police and returned to the mental institution.
25 February – 10 March	Curt Bacon	Rohan Michael	Curt is the director of a play Justine Welles (Bree Desborough) lands a role in. Curt spends plenty of time rehearsing with Justine and looks forward to a scene where Justine is required to be naked. Justine soon realises what Curt is up to and exposes his true nature when she improves a scene on stage and humiliates him.
8–24 March	Brian Rogers	Gerry Tacovsky	Brian is the father of Claire Rogers (Talie Maramount; Jaime Mears).
13 March	Ron Nicholas	Wayne Cull	Ron is the father of Charlie Nicholas (Toby Schmitz). He hires Tom Nash (Graeme Squires) boat for Charlie's homecoming party.
14–31 March	Charlie Nicholas	Toby Schmitz	Charlie meets Gypsy Nash (Kimberley Cooper) when she is waitressing at his party aboard her brother, Tom's (Graeme Squires) boat. He dumps his girlfriend Kirsten (Christa Nicola) and begins a relationship with Gypsy, despite her being involved with Will Smith (Zac Drayson). Charlie and Gypsy get drunk one afternoon and crash into a tree. They are rushed to hospital but Charlie dies as a result of his injuries.
14 March – 14 September	Kirsten	Christa Nicola	Kirsten is Charlie Nicholas' (Toby Schmitz) girlfriend. Charlie dumps her for Gypsy Nash (Kimberley Cooper). Several months after Charlie dies in a car accident, she blames Gypsys and begins stalking and playing mind games with her. Kirsten makes it looks as if Gypsy's boyfriend Harry Reynolds (Justin Melvey) is cheating on her. When the police close in on Kirsten, she flees the bay.
24 March – 21 April	Glenn Tanner	Craig Elliot	Glenn is a former flame of Natalie Nash (Antoinette Byron). They begin an affair in Queensland while Natalie visits her sick father there. He arrives in Summer Bay to continue their liaison but their meeting is witnessed by Natalie's daughter, Gypsy (Kimberley Cooper). It soon emerges Natalie is pregnant with Glenn's child and the news travels fast across the Bay. He leaves after Natalie rejects him.
24 March – 19 January 2001	Ted Simos	Harry Pavlidis	Ted is Leah Poulos' (Ada Nicodemou) ex-fiancé. He comes to Summer Bay in the hope of winning back Leah who fled from their wedding in the city. She rejects him and he leaves but he returns several months later and tries to convince her to leave her fiancé Vinnie Patterson (Ryan Kwanten) but is unsuccessful and leaves again.
31 March – 3 April	Philip Grigg	Barry Quinn	Grigg is the surgeon who tries to save the life of Charlie Nicholas (Toby Schmitz) following a car crash. He is unsuccessful as Charlie dies as a result of his injuries.
13 April – 11 May	Gilly Austen	Sarah Aubrey	Gilly is a tourist from Britain who catches the eye of Tom Nash (Grame Squires) when she hides out on his boat. Tom falls for Gilly but she is stringing him along. When Tom proposes, Gilly accepts but his friends are opposed to the engagement as they do not feel she is genuine. Gilly's ruse of wanting to marry Tom in order to gain Australian citizenship is exposed when he discovers she has a boyfriend, Rory (Justin Cotta). Tom then breaks up with Gilly.
21 April – 26 February 2009	Theo Poulos	Silvio Ofria	Theo is the father of Leah Poulos (Ada Nicodemou) and her brothers Dimitri (Salvatore Coco), Chris (Alex Blias) and Alex (Danny Raco). He arrives to try to convince Leah to return to the family after abandoning her wedding to Ted (Harry Pavlidis) and offers Vinnie Patterson (Ryan Kwanten) $50,000 to break up with Leah. However, Vinnie refuses and he and Leah later marry. Theo and his wife Helen (Peta Toppano) make periodic visits to Summer Bay over the years.
27 April	Rod Branson	Russell Newman	Rod is Mitch McColl's (Cameron Welsh) stepfather.
27 April	Mrs Branson	Lynne Porteous	Mrs. Branson is married to Rod Branson.
2–11 May	Rory	Justin Cotta	Rory is Gilly Austen's (Sarah Aubrey) boyfriend.
17–24 May	Kate O'Connor	Kris McQuade	Kate is the adoptive aunt of Shauna Bradley (Kylie Watson). She arrives in Summer Bay and puts pressure on her former cellmate Ailsa Stewart (Judy Nunn) to tell the truth about being Shauna's biological mother.
18–19 May	Pongo	Putu Winchester	Pongo is a friend of Sam Marshall's (Ryan Clark) from the professional surfing circuit.
18–19 May	Daniel Roxburgh	Michael Jenkinson	Daniel is a friend of Sam Marshall's (Ryan Clark) from the professional surfing circuit.
1–2 June	Margaret Bradley	Sonja Tallis	Margaret is Shauna Bradley's (Kylie Watson) adoptive mother.
5 June – 30 March 2001	Janice Angelo	Clarissa House	Janice works for the Department of Childcare services (DOCS). She works with Mitch McColl (Cameron Welsh) and Hayley Smith (Bec Cartwright) after they find Sarah Mackay dead in a storm drain and try to have a drop-in centre opened in the bay. Janice is able to talk Shelley Sutherland (Paula Forrest) into taking on the position of a counsellor. Janice tries to find Toni Davidson (Rowan Witt) a new home after learning her father, John (Sean Dennehy) is abusing her but another social worker arranges for Toni to live with her grandfather Leo (Bill Charlton).
5 June – 26 February 2009	Chris Poulos	Alex Blias	Chris is Leah Poulos' (Ada Nicodemou) older brother.
5 June – 18 January 2001	Sandy King	Renee Hodson	Sandy sneaks into the Beach House and is discovered by Will Smith (Zac Drayson). Her disappearing acts serve to cause Will's friends to think he is making her up. When Sandy supposedly breaks into a house, Will is reluctant to help her and the police arrive to arrest her but she quickly explains that she lives there and proves her identity. Sandy returns to Summer Bay several months later heavily pregnant and goes into labour at the Drop-in Centre and is assisted by Shelley Sutherland (Paula Forrest. After giving birth to her daughter, Bella Rose, Sandy flees but returns. She later begins a relationship with Sam Marshall (Ryan Clark but he leaves the bay and she returns to her ex-boyfriend Warren (Jamie Happell). Things quickly go sour with Warren when he begins hitting Sandy and Sam rescues her and they later move to the city and raise Bella together.
14 June – 11 October	Luke Harvey	Nick Flint	Luke is a friend of Kerian Fletcher (Spencer McLaren). He arrives to be his best man at his wedding to Sally Fletcher (Kate Ritchie). After Kieran and Sally's wedding does not go through, Luke returns to help Sally overcome her problem with Obsessive Compulsive Disorder and she falls for him. They begin a relationship shortly after Luke returns to help the victims of the Mudslide disaster and he proposes to Sally. The engagement is cut short when Sally doubts her feelings for Luke and shares a kiss with Brett Egan (Emmanuel Marshall).
15 June	Father MacKenzie	Michael Burgess	MacKenzie presides over the wedding of Sally Fletcher (Kate Ritchie) and Kieran (Spencer McLaren).
23 June	Edward Dunglass Snr.	Peter Sumner	Edward Snr is the late father of Edward Dunglass (Stephen James King). He appears on a videotape recorded prior to his death of Huntingdons' Disease, which is seen by his son.
28–30 June	Kel	Ben Tate	Kel is Dani Sutherland's (Tammin Sursok) boyfriend. He visits her in Summer Bay and she asks him to take her back to the city. When Dani talks to Kel about their future, He turns nasty towards her but is stopped by Will Smith (Zac Drayson).
28 June	Jack Nash	John Grant	Jack is the late father of Joel (David Woodley) and Travis Nash (Nic Testoni) who appears in childhood flashbacks when Joel moves back into the family home.
5 July	Mrs. Trent	Lois Ramsey	Mrs. Trent is Ailsa Stewart's (Nancye Hayes) former neighbour who greets her when she visits her childhood home in Melbourne.
6–28 July	Tasha Mills	Georgie Shew	Tasha is a friend of Dani Sutherland (Tammin Sursok). She showS an interest in Will Smith )Zac Drayson). Tasha steals a tape of Dani singing and broadcasts it to the school, leaving her embarrassed. Dani's sister, Kirsty(Christie Hayes) and Nick Smith (Chris Egan) steal Tasha's clothes as revenge. Tasha's athletic training begins to take its toll on her and she sprains her ankle. Her father, Gerry (Robert Noble) continues to train her hard and clashes with Will. When Will's father, Ken (Anthony Phelan) is crushed by a car at work, Tasha runs for help but is too late as Ken dies after the sudden release of pressure when Will lifts the car.
17–25 July	Rhonda Davies	Lynda Stoner	Rhonda is a caravan park customer who Les Smart (Rob Steele) takes a liking to. They begin an affair behind Les' wife Colleen's (Lyn Collingwood) back. Les and Rhonda leave Summer Bay together after Les lies to Colleen about getting a job in Queensland.
19 July	Roger Mackay	Paul Wilson	Roger and Lisa are the parents of Sarah Mackay, a teenager who was found dead in a storm drain the previous year. They attend the opening of the Drop-in center, which is named by Mitch McColl (Cameron Welsh) in Sarah's memory.
19 July	Lisa Mackay	Laura Keneally	Roger and Lisa are the parents of Sarah Mackay, a teenager who was found dead in a storm drain the previous year. They attend the opening of the Drop-in center, which is named by Mitch McColl (Cameron Welsh) in Sarah's memory.
27–28 July	Gerry Mills	Robert Noble	Gerry is the father of Tasha Mills (Georgie Shew).
2 August – 2 October	Gavin Campbell	Kim De Lury	Gavin is a journalist who immediately pursues Shauna Bradley (Kylie Watson) who rebuffs his advances at first but his persistence wins her over. It becomes apparent Gavin is in an unhappy marriage in order to remain in contact with his daughter Trisha (Laura Peck). They begin a relationship but Gavin's wife Alicia (Caroline Brazier) warns Shauna to stay away from him. When Alicia's body is found at the bottom of a cliff, both Gavin and Shauna are suspects but are cleared when Shauna's half-brother, Duncan Stewart (Brendan McKensy) admits he saw Alicia fall and tried to save her. A mudslide strikes Summer Bay and Gavin helps rescue Shauna's family but he is killed in the process.
2 August – 11 September	Alicia Campbell	Caroline Brazier	Alicia is married to Gavin Campbell. She becomes annoyed when Gavin takes an interest in Shauna Bradley and warns her off. Alicia dies in a cliff fall and both Gavin and Shauna are suspected of pushing her, however, they are cleared when Duncan Stewart reveals he saw Alicia fall to her death.
2–30 August	Trisha Campbell	Laura Peck	Trisha is the daughter of Gavin (Kim De Lury) and Alicia Campbell (Caroline Brazier).
9 August – 7 September 2001	Jan Hanson	Genevieve Sulway	Jan is the mother of Brodie Hanson (Susie Rugg) and her brother JT (Luke Ford). Jan arrives at the Sarah Mackay drop-in centre and tries to take Brodie home but gets violent when she refuses to leave with her. Jan retreats after Sally Fletcher (Kate Ritchie) threatens to call the police. The following year, Jan returns to the Bay and tells Brodie she has changed and broken up with her boyfriend Gary (Ian Hogson). She begins staying at the caravan park and makes a pass at Brodie's foster father, Rhys Sutherland (Michael Beckley). Brodie confronts Jan over this and she breaks down and Brodie decides to move back home. However, Gary arrives and Brodie spots him kissing Jan. Jan attacks Brodie when she asks her about the relationship and Brodie decides to stay with the Sutherlands and Jan and Gary leave.
29 August – 6 September	Stefan Hubert	Damen Stephenson	Stefan is the owner of a restaurant Vinnie Patterson (Ryan Kwanten) and Leah Poulos (Ada Nicodemou) visit. When Vinnie is unable to pay the bill, Leah offers to work off the debt when she reveals she works for the bayside diner and Stefan agrees. After being impressed with Leah's cooking, Stefan asks her to work for him at restaurant permanently and she agrees. Vinnie is suspicious that Stefan is making a move on Leah. It is later revealed Stefan is gay and in a relationship with a man named Mel Davies (Chris Scott).
6 September	Mel Davies	Chris Scott	Mel is the boyfriend of Stefan Hubert (Damen Stephenson).
5–11 October	Connor Nash	Connor Smith; McKenzie Roberts; Kaiden Eastough & Ryley Smith-Murdoch	Connor is the son of Natalie Nash (Antoinette Byron) and Glenn Tanner (Craig Elliot). Natalie brings him to Summer Bay shortly after her his birth when she learns her estranged husband Joel (David Woodley) has been injured during a mudslide.
11–13 October	JT Hanson	Luke Ford	JT is Brodie Hanson's (Susie Rugg) older brother. He arrives in Summer Bay to see his sister after fleeing from work after punching a colleague. Brodie covers for him and sneaks him food. He then burgles Colleen Smart's (Lyn Collingwood) mobile home and steals her pay. JT makes a move on Hayley Smith (Bec Cartwright) but she rejects him and he later hits her. He tries to flee but is chased down by a large group of beachgoers and is eventually collared by Hayley's brother, Will (Zac Drayson) who is about to punch him but is prevented by Rhys Sutherland (Michael Beckley).
24 October – 18 January 2001	Bella Rose King	Kelly Longhitano; Jessica Walker; Bianca Colisimo	Bella is the newborn daughter of Sandy (Renee Hodson) and Warren (Jamie Happell).
21 November – 9 February 2001	George	Keith Holloway	George is Irene Roberts' (Lynne McGranger) neighbour. When Surescape Holdings plan to develop on Beach Road, George accepts the first offer and he and his wife Margaret try to put pressure Irene into doing the same, but she refuses.
22 November – 9 February 2001	Dennis Scott	Alistair Barnes	Dennis is a representative of Surescape Holdings, a property development firm with plans to develop on Beach Road. He tries to persuade Irene Roberts (Lynne McGranger) to sell up but she refuses. Undeterred, He continues to threaten Irene into selling up by sending around heavies. When the community turn on Dennis at a meeting, he finds it too much and later commits suicide.
24 November	Warren	Jamie Happell	Warren is the ex-boyfriend of Sandy King and the father of their daughter Bella. He tries to stop Sam Marshall (Ryan Clark) from taking them back to Summer Bay to escape his controlling ways but is unsuccessful.
24 November	Eileen Van Der Horst	Uncredited	Eileen is Donald Fisher's (Norman Coburn) publisher for his book Letter to Byron.
