= Peta Janossi =

- Home and Away character
- Portrayed by: Aleetza Wood
- Duration: 1999–2000
- First appearance: 27 May 1999
- Last appearance: 14 July 2000
- Introduced by: John Holmes
In-universe information
- Occupation: Student
- Brothers: David Janossi

Peta Janossi is a fictional character from the Australian television soap opera Home and Away, portrayed by Aleetza Wood. She made her first appearance during the episode broadcast on 27 May 1999 and departed on 14 July 2000.

Peta is a local girl who seemingly blends into the background until she is given a makeover by Hayley Smith (Bec Cartwright). She begins a relationship with Will Smith (Zac Drayson) but it does not last. Peta is discovered to be living with her brother David (Philip Edwards) and invents a cover story in which a homeless woman, Annie Matthews (Carole Skinner) poses as Peta's late grandmother. She is then fostered by Joel (David Woodley) and Natalie Nash (Antoinette Byron).

Peta's final story arc revolves around her relationship with eccentric goth, Edward Dunglass (Stephen James King) and her support of him in the wake of the discovery of his Huntington's disease.

== Casting ==
Aleetza Wood had not had any drama lessons or screen acting experience before she attended her first ever audition for a role in Home and Away. She admitted that she was not scared and felt calm beforehand, as she "didn't have a hope in hell" of winning the role. She had also heard from friends that she would need to attend dozens of auditions before getting started in the acting industry. She stated: "I didn't really know what I was doing. I just breezed in, did the audition and breezed out again." A week later, Wood learned through a phone call with her agent that she had impressed the casting directors and had won the role of Peta. She explained: "I was on the phone to my best friend and I was actually talking about the audition, and my mobile rang, and it was my agent on the other line. He didn't sound too happy, and I just guessed that I didn't get it. He then yelled out that I got the part and I was screaming and having a two-way conversation with my friend and agent. I went to work that night and I was serving customers with the biggest smile on my face".

Wood said she was "plunged straight in at the deep end" when she began filming. She had to learn the technical side of acting in front of cameras, which she found to be really difficult. She also chose to drop out of her Media and Culture course at university, as she found it hard to balance learning lines and doing assignments. She felt the part of Peta was too good an opportunity to lose. Wood was 20 years old at the time of her casting, while her character was supposed to be 16. She had to remember what it was like to be "a self-conscious teenager" and use that awkwardness in her portrayal of Peta. Wood also found Peta "a real challenge", but also fun to play. Series producer Russell Webb chose Wood for the role of Peta due to her "fresh-faced" look. He said "She is a gutsy little performer, who at 20 looks young enough to play a 16-year-old but has that maturity level, which her character is supposed to have. She is perfect for the role."

== Development ==
Peta is introduced as a teenage school student, who was born and raised in Summer Bay. Wood commented that it was "strange playing a 16-year-old", but she enjoyed working with the younger cast members, as they had so much energy. She also admitted that she did not mind having to wear a school uniform, as she felt that she looked much younger than her real age. However, she told Jason Herbison of TV Week that she is "a lot more mature than Peta, so it's a little odd to be playing someone still at that stage in their life." Peta is "an outspoken tomboy" who befriends Hayley Smith (Rebecca Cartwright) and becomes a new love interest for her brother Will Smith (Zac Drayson). Peta and Hayley meet when they enter a Best Friends modelling competition together. As their friendship progresses, Peta then meets Will. Wood described her character as being "very passionate about everything in life and she's a nice kid. She can tend to fly off the handle at different times, but only because she cares so much about everything." Wood shared some similarities with her character, including their tomboy look. But Wood said her clothes were "boring" compared to Peta's, which often had interesting seams and sleeves. Peta enters the serial with a secret, as it emerges that both of her parents are dead and it is unclear who she lives with.

It eventually emerges that the grandmother Peta has told everyone she lives with, actually died some time ago, leaving her on her own. When a jury summons for Peta's grandmother arrives, she and Will concoct a plan to have "bag lady" Annie Matthews (Carole Skinner) pose as Peta's grandmother and collect a medical certificate to get out of jury duty. Wood explained that Annie "isn't that hard to persuade" as she is offered free food and a bed. However, Wood said that her character feels sorry for Annie because she is quite sick and allows her to stay after she collects the certificate. Wood continued: "Everything is going OK until Annie starts taking the granny role a little too seriously." Will and Peta's romance progresses slowly, especially with interference from Annie. Peta then discovers that Annie attended a parent-teacher night at the school and made up a childhood for Peta. Wood stated "Peta's relationship with Will is going well. They are taking it slow and just kissing, but Annie starts interfering in their relationship, which is something Peta gets very frustrated about." Wood enjoyed having the chance to work with Skinner, saying they had a great time on set and would exchange jokes. She also felt that she learnt a lot about acting from Skinner.

In late May 2000, Jason Herbison of Inside Soap reported that Wood was leaving Home and Away after just over a year in the role of Peta. Herbison confirmed that Wood had already filmed her final scenes and was planning to spend the rest of the year in the UK. Wood commented, "I'm pleased to be going out on a high. There are some big storylines surrounding Peta's exit, which is great. I'm very happy to be moving to England, too."

== Storylines ==
Peta appears when Hayley Smith is approached by a classmate, her friend Heather (Camilla Freeman), who wants her to be her partner in a competition for two friends to advertise skincare products. Peta accuses Hayley of taking Heather off her but learns Heather approached Hayley and considers Peta too plain to be her partner, Hayley and Peta ditch Heather and enter the competition together. Peta's makeover attracts the attentions of Hayley's older brother, Will. He asks her out but when Hayley mistakenly believes he was only getting her out of the way so she and her boyfriend Sam Marshall (Ryan Clark) can spend time together, Peta leaves in a huff. Hayley and Sam then scheme to put Peta and Will together.

Peta's home life raises questions from her when she alleges she lives with her grandmother but nobody has seen her and they become suspicious when Peta is reluctant to let them come over. It emerges that Peta's grandmother died while overseas in Poland the previous year and she and her brother, David (Philip Edwards) failed to report her death for fear they would be split up and sent to separate foster homes and continued living off her pension. A jury summons arrives for Peta's grandmother while David is away and Peta concocts a scheme with Will to have Annie Matthews, an elderly bag lady with bronchitis to pose as her late grandmother and has James Fraser (Michael Picciliri) writes a letter saying Annie is unsuitable for jury service. Events backfire when Annie takes her role to heart. Peta, wanting rid of Annie, enlists Will's help in tracking down Annie's daughter, Frances Kennedy (Alice Livingstone). The plan is successful but everything is revealed when Irene Roberts (Lynne McGranger) arrives.

Irene arranges for Peta to live with Travis (Nic Testoni) and Rebecca Nash (Belinda Emmett) but they are leaving Summer Bay shortly. Travis' brother Joel (David Woodley) and his wife Natalie (Antoinette Byron), become official foster parents and keep an eye on Peta and Justine Welles, the other remaining foster child. Peta's relationship with Will runs into difficulty when it is clear Will is still close to his ex-girlfriend Gypsy Nash (Kimberley Cooper), and she is not ready to have sex. When the group have a car crash, Peta and Hayley are annoyed when Will covers for Gypsy but not the rest of them, supposedly because her father is a police officer. Eventually, Will and Peta split and he reunites with Gypsy.

Edward Dunglass (Stephen James King) arrives in town and he and Peta become an item. When she tells him she regrets being unable to attend her gran's funeral, he arranges an improvised memorial service at the cemetery, although she is mortified when they were interrupted by Colleen Smart (Lyn Collingwood), who is convinced they are up to no good. Peta learns that Edward's father, Edward Senior (Peter Sumner) died of Huntington's disease, meaning he could well have inherited it, and is concerned by his "live for the moment" attitude, including diving off Jump Rock. She issues him an ultimatum; stop the stunts or they will break up. Initially, Edward take the second option but later changed his mind and they reconcile. The couple then begin attending self-defence lessons but Edward is discouraged but suggests Peta continue. Edward suggests they get married and they stage an unofficial wedding at the caravan park. There is resistance to the union but Edward's mother Judith Ackroyd (Anna Hruby) agrees to let the couple live with her.

Following Edward's official diagnosis of Huntington's, Peta supports him and agrees to go travelling with him. The couple then leave the Bay to stay with Judith's sister in Rome. Will visits them the following year.

== Reception ==
For her portrayal of Peta, Wood was nominated for the Logie Award for Most Popular New Female Talent in 2000. While observing Peta and Edward's romance, Herald Sun critic Jackie Brygel felt sorry for her, saying "Poor Peta. The girl is appearing to be highly unsuccessful in her bid to seduce the, er, very unusual-looking Edward".
