= Ken Smith (Home and Away) =

- Home and Away character
- Portrayed by: Anthony Phelan
- Duration: 1999–2001, 2003–2004
- First appearance: 26 April 1999
- Last appearance: 30 June 2004
- Introduced by: John Holmes (1999); Julie McGuaran (2001)
In-universe information
- Occupation: Mechanic
- Wife: Eve Smith (divorced)
- Sons: Will Smith; Nick Smith
- Daughters: Hayley Smith
- Grandsons: Noah Smith
- Granddaughters: Lily Smith

Ken Smith is a fictional character from the Australian television soap opera Home and Away, played by Anthony Phelan. He made his first appearance on 26 April 1999 and departed on 28 July 2000 following the character's death. Phelan reprised the role when the character reappeared as a ghost until 2004.

Ken's storylines include him battling alcoholism, holding down a job and repairing his relationship with his three children Will (Zac Drayson), Hayley (Bec Cartwright) and Nick (Chris Egan). Ken falls for Irene Roberts (Lynne McGranger), who fosters his children and they later become engaged. Ken is killed when a car falls on top of him at work after a jack slips. Ken continues to appear in the visions of his children

== Storylines ==
Ken arrives in Summer Bay after spotting his estranged daughter Hayley's (Bec Cartwright) entry in art competition along with her photo and decides to get in contact with his children again. Hayley is pleased to see him again but his son Will (Zac Drayson) is not as Ken is an alcoholic who mistreated him in the past during his fragile marriage to Will's mentally unstable mother, Eve (Robyn Gibbes). Ken falls for Will and Hayley's foster mother, Irene Roberts (Lynne McGranger) and Will is worried Ken will hurt her. When Irene lines up a job interview for the position of Janitor at Summer Bay High, Ken is grateful but he falls asleep on the beach and misses the interview and arrives at school drunk much the horror of his children. Will and Hayley tell Ken to leave until he sorts himself out and he leaves.

Ken returns to the Bay several months later a changed man and resumes his relationship with Irene. Will is still unconvinced and seemingly catches Ken drinking alcohol with his boss Jack Brown (Paul Chubb). However, Ken explains that he poured the beer away while Jack wasn't looking and Will eventually forgives him. Ken settles in the Bay permanently and he takes over Jesse McGregor's (Ben Unwin) garage. And he can also convince his youngest son Nick (Chris Egan) to come and live with them so the family is reunited. Ken proposes to Irene and she accepts, but Nick is resistant to the reunion and believes Ken is trying to erase Eve's memory. After Eve escapes the asylum and menaces Irene, she is arrested and Nick begins to accept Irene and Ken's relationship.

Several days before the wedding, while Ken and Will are working together in the garage, Ken is under the car when the jack slips and is crushed as a result. Will panics and sends Tasha Mills (Georgie Shew) for help but by the time help arrives, Ken dies as a result of his injuries. Will blames himself for his father's death. Ken then reappears as a vision to Hayley when she attends the launch of Donald Fisher (Norman Coburn) book, she helped illustrate. He next appears in a dream when Nick runs away from home and spends the night at the garage which is about to be demolished and tells him that Irene would understand. He also seen in a childhood video with his children. Ken's final appearance to date is as a vision to Hayley, when she marries Noah Lawson (Beau Brady). He tells her would not have missed the wedding and walks her down the aisle.

== Reception ==
While visiting Kilcullen to see where his grandfather had lived and worked, Phelan found himself mobbed in public by local schoolchildren who recognised him from the serial.

Jackie Brygel of the Herald Sun criticised the way Ken tried to woo Irene Roberts, writing "here's a tip for you, Ken. Making a woman pay for her own soft-serve cone at the ice cream van is definitely not the way to her heart."
