= Jesse McGregor =

- Home and Away character
- Portrayed by: Ben Unwin
- Duration: 1996–2000, 2002–2005
- First appearance: 20 May 1996
- Last appearance: 26 July 2005
- Introduced by: John Holmes (1996); Julie McGuaran (2002)
In-universe information
- Occupation: Bait Shop assistant; Mechanic; Gym worker
- Daughters: Rachel McGregor

Jesse McGregor is a fictional character from the Australian soap opera Home and Away, played by actor Ben Unwin. He made his first screen appearance during the episode broadcast on 20 May 1996. The actor departed in 2000, but returned in 2002 and departed once again on 26 July 2005.

== Casting ==
Unwin originally auditioned for a separate role in the show but was unsuccessful. Producers decided to create the role of Jesse specifically for Unwin to portray. Jesse's original stint in the series lasted from 1996 until 2000, when the character was written out of the show following Jesse being sent to prison for burning down the local bait shop. He returned to the show in 2002.

== Development ==
=== Daughter ===
A few months after his introduction, it emerged that Jesse has a young daughter, Rachel (Kelly Glaister). She and her mother Kylie Burton (Roslyn Oades) arrive in Summer Bay following the death of Kylie's father, who was supporting the family. Kylie asks Jesse to find them some money quickly, which tempts him to steal. Unwin explained that Jesse was not present when his daughter was born, as Kylie's father took her to Queensland to have the baby. He said, "now Jesse wants to be responsible for Rachel. He wants to give her a decent life." Jesse wants to be the perfect father, but he struggles to resist returning to his criminal past. Unwin commented that his character had "been down that road so many times", especially in the Bay, and he had gotten away with it so far.

=== Relationships with Selina Cook and Gypsy Nash ===
Jesse has a long-term relationship with Selina Cook (Tempany Deckert). Selina's best friend Chloe Richards (Kristy Wright), develops feelings for Jesse and kisses him. Selina breaks up with Jesse over the kiss and Chloe assumes that she is free to enter a relationship with him. Wright told a reporter from Inside Soap that Chloe is not being spiteful and "genuinely has an attraction" to Jesse. She added "it's like anyone in love, you just cant help it." Jesse is more interested in getting back together with Selina, which makes Chloe jealous. Wright and Unwin had been long-term friends and he had lobbied the show's writers with the idea of Jesse and Chloe cheating on Selina. With his story idea coming together on-screen, Wright added that "Ben loves all this".

Producers later paired Jesse with Gypsy Nash (Kimberley Cooper). Cooper explained that Gypsy once had a crush on Jesse, but it died down and she had a long-term relationship with Will Smith (Zac Drayson). A week after Gypsy and Will break up, Gypsy shares a "passionate" kiss with Jesse. Will sees the couple together, and Cooper said Gypsy does feel guilty about him, but "her attraction to Jesse is just too much for her to resist." The couple face some opposition to their relationship because of the age gap between them. Cooper wanted the pair to overcome their issues, as she enjoyed working with Unwin, who was one of her good friends.

=== Relationship with Leah Patterson-Baker ===
Writers paired Jesse with Leah Patterson-Baker (Ada Nicodemou), who has been widowed following the supposed death of her husband Vinnie Patterson (Ryan Kwanten). Their relationship struggles because Leah is religious and finds it difficult to move on from Vinnie. Leah makes a decision to move their relationship forward by allowing him to stay the night at her house in a separate room. Unwin told Jason Herbison from Inside Soap that "it's a huge breakthrough because Jesse wanted to get closer to Leah for so long. Leah is very religious and even though they don't sleep together, it's a big deal because she has a man in the house."

Writers portrayed them as being in a turbulent relationship marred with problems and trust issues. Trust becomes an issue when Leah refuses to tell her parents about Jesse because he is an ex-convict. While interviewed by Herbison, Nicodemou recounted that Jesse "was really hurt" that she kept their relationship a secret. He often concludes that Leah will not disclose their involvement because she is "ashamed" of him. Nicodemou believed that Leah thought her parents would not be understanding about Jesse's incarceration and decided they were better off not knowing. Leah eventually changes her mind but they discover the truth first. She described that as the moment "everything went haywire" for the two characters. Leah's family disapprove of Jesse but Leah defends Jesse.

This changes when Jesse temporarily loses Leah's son VJ Patterson while visiting the local beach. He keeps it a secret but when Leah discovers the truth she ends their relationship. Nicodemou explained that Jesse's actions cause Leah to doubt their future. She added "the whole thing about telling her folks was a trust issue—now she finds out that she can't even trust Jesse with her son." Leah arranges a meeting with Jesse and break up with him because "she can't give him what he needs". Jesse is "upset" and pleads with Leah to reconsider. The actress believed the couple tried to succeed to soon after Vinnie's death. She thought that Leah would be better off concentrating on getting closure regarding Vinnie.

Following their break up, Leah begins to suspect that she is being followed and thinks Jesse may be stalking her. Leah continues to worry after she hears someone in her home and finds some flowers. She accuses Jesse of stalking her and tells him to move on. He proves he is unaware of the flowers and Leah begins to suspect that Vinnie has faked his own death.

=== Relationship with Josie Russell and self-destruction ===
Jesse's next relationship is with Josie Russell (Laurie Foell) and they become engaged. Josie has an affair with Brett Macklin (Gerry Sont) and the pair break up. Jesse finds it difficult to deal with seeing Josie and Brett together and writers created a downward spiral story for him. Unwin told an Inside Soap reporter that "Jesse is at a stage where he doesn't give a damn about anyone or anything, he tried playing Mr Nice Guy, but look where that got him."

Jesse rebounds from Josie by sleeping with Martha MacKenzie (Jodi Gordon) and continues to become angered when he sees Josie and Brett. Unwin explained that "all the hurt comes flooding back" each time he sees them. He sets fire to Brett's resort plans but the police cannot gather evidence to charge him. His behaviour forces Martha to disown him and he begins drinking heavily. This sees Jesse "hit rock bottom" and he steals money from the till at his surf club business. When his business partners Hayley Smith (Bec Cartwright) and Alf Stewart (Ray Meagher) try to sell his share to Beth Hunter (Clarissa House), he becomes violent. He causes a scene in the surf club and elbows Hayley, who is pregnant, in the stomach. Unwin defended his character stating "Jesse feels awful because, on top of everything, he may have now done serious damage to her unborn baby."

=== Departure ===
Unwin quit the serial in March 2005 to pursue work in America. After Chloe was reintroduced into the series, writers revisited the romantic connection between her and Jesse. When Troy Peters (Christian Willis) arrives in Summer Bay and harasses Chloe, Jesse becomes protective of her. A Home and Away publicist revealed that "Jesse has a soft spot for Chloe, and viewers will find out whether she feels the same."

Producers created a car crash stunt to celebrate the show's 4,000th episode. It was revealed that the episode was a "big milestone" and that a character would be killed off in the crash. The story developed into a hit and run style crash, with Chloe being killed off and Jesse driving the responsible vehicle. This formed part of Jesse's departure from the series and Jesse is sent to prison after he confesses to causing Chloe's death.

== Storylines ==
=== 1996–2000 ===
Jesse is first seen when he rescues Selina, Chloe (Kristy Wright), and Curtis Reed (Shane Ammann) from a group of criminals. Jesse settles into the area and begins a relationship with Selina. Selina becomes suspicious when Chloe tells her Jesse mentioned the name Rachel as true love while under hypnosis. When confronted, Jesse reveals that Rachel is his daughter and he has not seen her in several years. When Jesse's ex-girlfriend Kylie Burton is arrested, he becomes Rachel's guardian. Jesse later moves in with Travis Nash (Nic Testoni) and Lachlan Fraser (Richard Grieve), during this time Jesse goes into partnership with Alf at his bait shop.

When Kylie returns, Jesse is reluctant to let Rachel go and plans to flee the state with her during the custody battle. After Selina and Irene flag down the bus, Jesse sees sense and returns for the hearing which he loses. Jesse is devastated when Selina dumps him for her former flame, Steven Matheson (Adam Willits).

After a few short flings, Kylie and Rachel reappear. Jesse and Kylie fall in love again and become engaged to be married. The event is marred when Kylie is arrested and later imprisoned. Tragedy strikes when Kylie dies in custody of a drug overdose, leaving a devastated Jesse to raise Rachel (now Sara Mumcu) alone.

After the bait shop is burned to the ground and he is accused of it, Jesse opens his own business—a garage. Jesse at first refuses to do any illegal work but is forced to when Mick Dwyer (John Brumpton) persistently threatens him. When constable Joel Nash (David E. Woodley) gets wind of this, Jesse and Mick flee and a high-speed car chase ensues. The cars crash and Joel is left trapped, Jesse acts quickly to save him but is nearly shot for his trouble. Jesse handcuffs Mick to the steering wheel and Joel lets him get away. After saying goodbye to Rachel and arranging for her to live with Joel and his family, Jesse flees into the night. Several months later, Jesse gives himself up and is sentenced to two years in prison. He is later joined by former housemate Vinnie who is serving after being framed for fraud. Upon his release, Jesse makes a promise to Vinnie that he will look after his wife Leah.

=== 2002–2005 ===
Jesse returns to Summer Bay and is welcomed by old friends Irene Roberts (Lynne McGranger) Hayley, Sally Fletcher (Kate Ritchie). However some other locals are not so keen on Jesse's presence in the area, Hayley's boyfriend Noah Lawson (Beau Brady) is immediately suspicious, Josh West (Daniel Collopy) takes an instant dislike to him and Leah's brother Alex Poulos (Danny Raco) is initially wary of him. During his first month back in the bay, Jesse has two brushes with the law when he beats up Jason Edwards (Benj Daddario) and Kelvin Matthews (James Donnellan), respectively in two incidents involving harassment of Alex and Hayley. Unable to control his anger, Jesse turns to Flynn Saunders (Martin Dingle-Wall) for help. Jesse later visits Rachel in Queensland and tries to get her to return home with him. After He realises she is happy with the Nashes, Jesse returns to the Bay alone.

Jesse develops romantic feelings for Leah and they become closer when news of Vinnie's apparent death in a prison fire is broadcast. Jesse proposes and Leah rejects him at first but later agrees to a relationship. When Jesse's former flame, Angie Russell (Laurie Foell) is found dead in her home, he is one of many suspects but is cleared. The real culprit later revealed as her son, Dylan (Brett Hicks-Maitland). Leah and Jesse's relationship is tested when Sally and Flynn ask Leah to be a surrogate mother for them. After learning Leah and Flynn shared a brief kiss, Jesse's jealousy gets the better of him and he and Leah break up.

Hayley's brother Will Smith returns to Summer Bay for Hayley and Noah's wedding, He asks Will for permission for him and his wife Gypsy Nash to officially adopt Rachel. Jesse is reluctant at first but agrees to it. Jesse has brief relationships with Alf's granddaughter, Martha and Angie's cousin Josie but neither last very long. When Chloe returns to town for Alf's 60th birthday party, Jesse's old feelings from a kiss they shared several years earlier resurface but he is rebuffed by Chloe who only wants to be friends and he leaves the party early. After Chloe is killed in a hit and run car collision, Jesse realises he was the driver and is responsible for her death. He hands himself in to the police. Alf and Irene are both disgusted with him and after an emotional goodbye with, Sally, Leah and Martha, Jesse is transferred to a city jail.

== Reception ==
For his portrayal of Jesse, Unwin was nominated for Most Popular New Talent at the 1997 Logie Awards. He also earned a nomination for Most Popular Newcomer at the 3rd National Television Awards. In 1999, Unwin received nominations for Best Actor and Sexiest Male from the Inside Soap Awards.

An Inside Soap columnist dubbed the character "the Bay's loveable rogue". While another writer for the publication dubbed him "a man of many hidden depths." In January 2005, Inside Soap asked its readers to decide whether Jesse should remain with Leah. Sixty-two per cent of readers voted that he should move on from Leah. Matt Bagwell from HuffPost said that Jesse's most memorable story was being sent to prison for the bait-shop arson attack.

Jack Guy from CNN said "Jesse played a major role in the long-running soap and was seen as something of a bad boy who was no stranger to a brush with the law." A BBC News writer called him a "bad boy" role. An ITV News reporter branded Jesse a "rebellious" character and Katie Rosseinsky of the Evening Standard shared their opinion calling Jesse a "rebellious teen". Gwilym Mumford writing for The Guardian described Jesse as a "roguish" and "cult character". Molly Pike from the Daily Mirror wrote "bad boy Jesse was known for getting into trouble with the law." A reporter from Heart radio station echoed this, stating "his character was known for having his fair few brushes with the law and was sent to prison." In 2025, Peter Hart from Daily Mirror described Jesse as a "bad boy" type character.
