= Gypsy Nash =

Fictional character

- Home and Away character
- Portrayed by: Kimberley Cooper
- Duration: 1998–2002, 2011
- First appearance: 18 February 1998
- Last appearance: 13 October 2011
- Introduced by: John Holmes (1998); Cameron Welsh (2011)
In-universe information
- Occupation: Student; Counsellor; Waitress
- Father: Joel Nash
- Mother: Natalie Nash
- Brothers: Tom Nash
- Half-brothers: Connor Nash
- Husband: Will Smith (2002–11)
- Daughters: Lily Smith
- Adoptive daughters: Rachel McGregor
- Grandfathers: Jack Nash
- Uncles: Travis Nash; David Andrews
- Aunts: Claire Andrews

Gypsy Nash (also Smith) is a fictional character from the Australian Channel Seven soap opera Home and Away, played by Kimberley Cooper. She debuted on-screen during the episode airing on 18 February 1998. Gypsy and her on-screen family the Nashes were introduced to fill the void of Debra Lawrance's departure as Pippa Ross, to form the main family at the caravan park home, often described as "the centre of Summer Bay". Cooper quit the serial in 2001 and last appeared on 15 February 2002. Cooper has won two awards for her portrayal of Gypsy and is often referred to as a "sex symbol" of the serial. In June 2011, it was announced that Cooper had reprised her role as Gypsy. She returned on 9 September 2011 and departed on 13 October 2011.

== Character creation and casting ==
In 1997, after Debra Lawrance quit her role as Pippa Ross producers decided to introduce a new family to run the caravan park, because the household was seen as the "centrepiece of the show". They created the Nash family consisting of Gypsy played by Cooper, sibling Tom (Graeme Squires) and their parents Natalie and Joel Nash played by Angelica la Bozzetta and David Woodley respectively. The family come to Summer Bay from Hong Kong to start a new life.

Cooper later spoke fondly of the serial, stating: "I never look at Home and Away and cringe [...] Unapologetically it's good TV for the time that it is made in." In 2009 executive producer Cameron Welsh stated he would love to see Cooper return as Gypsy. In 2010, Zac Drayson who plays Cooper's on-screen husband Will Smith revealed that Cooper wanted to return alongside him, but could not commit to filming because of her wedding commitments.

In June 2011, it was announced that Cooper had reprised her role as Gypsy and had returned to filming in May. Cooper confirmed that Gypsy's return would be "dramatic, in true Gypsy style". Gypsy returned with her daughter Lily in September 2011.

== Storylines ==
Gypsy arrives in Summer Bay, her father's old home town, with her father Joel, mother Natalie and older brother Tom. She is not used to the quieter pace of life in the bay and prefers the busy environment of a city, having grown up in Hong Kong. While rollerblading, Gypsy falls down and is helped up by Travis Nash (Nic Testoni), who Joel reveals to be her uncle. She soon learns that Joel and Travis had not spoken since Joel left town after their father, Jack (John Grant), her grandfather behaved inappropriately towards Natalie. Both branches of the Nashes soon reconcile. Vinnie Patterson (Ryan Kwanten) takes an interest in Gypsy but she rebuffs him after learning he is involved with Justine Welles (Bree Desborough). Will Smith catches Gypsy's eye and she purchases dope in order to impress him but the plan backfires when Joel and Travis find in the fridge and Gypsy reports the dealer, Lillian Reynolds (Nitya Gehl) to the school. Gypsy, Justine and Tiegan Brook (Sally Marrett) form a band called the Broken Dolls, managed by Vinnie. After their first performance at a school dance, Gypsy and Will sneak off to a classroom to spend time together and end up trapped in the school for the night. Joel is furious when he finds out and tries to split them up. However, after Joel begins to approve of Will, Gypsy loses interest. They later reunite but split again after Will treats the matter of intimacy casually. Gypsy briefly dates Sam Marshall (Ryan Clark) but does not see him other than a friend.

Gypsy then begins seeing her tutor Robert Perez (Tony Poli). Nobody is aware that Robert is actually David D'Angelo, a criminal who Joel had imprisoned fifteen years earlier. He kidnaps Gypsy and forces her to record a message, which is sent to the family. Gypsy sneaks in a clue to her location and is rescued. David then sets fire to the house nearly killing the family. Travis saves Gypsy and David is finally arrested. The Nashes move in with Travis and his wife Rebecca (Belinda Emmett) and Gypsy befriends their foster children, Justine and Peta Janossi (Aleetza Wood). Gypsy and Will remain close despite not dating and Gypsy starts seeing Jesse McGregor (Ben Unwin). The age difference worries a few people but her parents cautiously approve. Gypsy, however, soon finds the relationship dull as Jesse is a single father. She meets a man online and agrees to meet him at the surf club only to discover that her secret admirer is Tom, who in turn had no idea he was talking to Gypsy, much to their mutual horror. Mitch McColl (Cameron Welsh) arrives and he and Gypsy date for a while but she backs off when he realises Hayley Smith (Bec Cartwright) likes him. Gypsy later sleeps with Mitch and it causes friction with Hayley and their other friends.

When Tom takes Alf Stewart's (Ray Meagher) boat out for a rich kid's party, he asks Gypsy to help out. She soon takes a liking to the birthday boy, Charlie Nicholas (Toby Schmitz), and starts dating him, even though she is still seeing Will. She quickly realises Charlie had a drink problem but enjoyed the party lifestyle too much. Gypsy soon sobers up when she discovers Natalie has been an affair with an old friend, Glen Tanner (Craig Elliot), and he is the father of her unborn child. Immediately afterwards, Charlie's drinking involves the pair in a car accident resulting in Charlie's death and Gypsy receiving serious injuries. Gypsy then bonds with Natalie, who like herself is, vilified for an affair and is upset when she and Tom leave the Bay, leaving Gypsy alone with Joel.

Kieran Fletcher (Spencer McLaren), Sally Copeland's fiancé makes advances towards Gypysy and taunts her by saying no-one will believe her. Gypsy remains silent until halfway through the wedding when she announces what has been going on. Hayley and Colleen Smart (Lyn Collingwood) confirm this and Sally jilts Kieran. Joel and Gypsy move back into Joel's old family home with Vinnie. Gypsy then takes a job at the local Drop-in-center and forms a close bond with boss Shelley Sutherland (Paula Forrest) but things are made uncomfortable by the fact that her daughter, Dani (Tammin Sursok) is seeing Will. Gypsy begins seeing Harry Reynolds (Justin Melvey). Charlie's ex, Kirsten (Christa Nicola) makes a hoax call to Gypsy telling her Harry is dead and is arrested as a result. Gypsy and Harry's relationship crumbles when she finds out he still has feeling for Shauna. Gypsy finds herself developing romantic feelings for Shelley. She then goes out with Desiree Upton (Simone Robertson) and shares a kiss and realises she is not a lesbian.

Gypsy later sleeps with Will and she soon falls pregnant and lies about the baby's paternity but Sally and Tom soon realise the truth. Will eventually realises he is the father and Gypsy considers leaving town but eventually accepts Will has a right to choose to be involved. They reunite after Will and Dani break up and Gypsy moves in with him. She gives birth to a daughter, Lily by the roadside with Will supporting her. Will proposes and Gypsy accepts. After accepting a job in Queensland near Gypsy's family, they have a symbolic wedding ceremony as a marriage license will not be available for four weeks. They later marry legally in Queensland. They later adopt Jesse's Daughter, Rachel (Sarah Mumcu).

When Will returns to the Bay in 2010, he reveals he had cheated on Gypsy and they have separated. Gypsy returns the following year to see Irene, following her breast cancer diagnosis. Gypsy and Lily (Charlie Rose Maclennan) move in with Irene, Bianca Scott (Lisa Gormley) and April Scott (Rhiannon Fish). Gypsy tells Irene she is dating a man named Mark Gilmour (Shane Emmett), but he and Lily do not get on well. Gypsy tries to help care for Irene and she gets on Bianca's nerves. Gypsy is attracted to Liam Murphy (Axle Whitehead) and she organises a gig for him at the restaurant. Mark comes to visit Gypsy and he and Lily clash. Mark later suggests sending Lily to boarding school, but Gypsy disagrees with the idea. She later has sex with Liam on the beach, but they are interrupted by Bianca. Lily tells Mark and he and Gypsy break up. Irene tells Gypsy to leave and she and Lily pack up and go home.

== Reception ==
At the 41st Logie Awards Cooper won the "Most Popular New Female Talent" award for her portrayal of Gypsy, she was the first ever recipient of the award. Gypsy's kidnapping was nominated for "Most Dramatic Storyline" at the 1999 Inside Soap Awards. The following year, Cooper won an award in the "Best Aussie actress" category.

In 2002, Chris Middendorp of The Age said Gypsy was a "schoolgirl tart" who dominated the 2000 season of Home and Away as "she explored romantic opportunity in all the wrong places - rich playboys, schoolboys, older men. She finally embraced true love with young Will, one of her first boyfriends." Soap opera reporting website Holy Soap included Gypsy on their list of "Sexiest Home and Away girls ever" list. They also brand her most memorable moments as "being kidnapped and having a baby with Will Smith". The Courier-Mail include Cooper on their list of sexiest ever Home and Away characters. In his book Super Aussie Soaps, author Andrew Mercado criticised the Nash family because of their Hong Kong origin, stating: "Was Summer Bay finally turning multicultural and getting an Asian family? Fat Chance. They were middle-class Causasians just like everyone else in the Bay (and Neighbours' Ramsay Street)."

Jon Horsley of Yahoo! was happy that Gypsy was returning to the serial and said "It’s always nice to have a nostalgic favourite return."
