= Colleen Smart =

- Home and Away character
- Portrayed by: Lyn Collingwood
- Duration: 1988–1989, 1997, 1999–2013
- First appearance: 7 March 1988
- Last appearance: 24 January 2013
- Introduced by: Alan Bateman (1988); John Holmes (1997, 1999); Lucy Addario (2012)
- Book appearances: Home and Away: Mayday
- Spin-off appearances: Home and Away: Secrets and the City
In-universe information
- Occupation: Shop assistant Waitress; Receptionist; House cleaner
- Father: Gordon Stewart
- Mother: Mavis Hickey
- Adoptive father: Merv Hickey
- Half-brothers: Alf Stewart
- Half-sisters: Morag Bellingham; Celia Stewart; Debra Stewart; Barbara Stewart
- Husband: Les Smart (1965–2000)
- Sons: Lance Smart
- Daughters: Maureen Evans
- Granddaughters: Maggie Smart
- Grandfathers: Angus Stewart
- Nephews: Owen Dalby; Duncan Stewart; Alan Fisher
- Nieces: Quinn Jackson; Roo Stewart; Rebecca Nash; Bobby Marshall
- Other relatives: Seb Miller; Martha MacKenzie; Ric Dalby; Bryce Stewart

Colleen Smart is a fictional character from the Australian Channel Seven soap opera Home and Away, played by Lyn Collingwood. The character debuted on-screen during the episode airing on 7 March 1988. She was introduced as a recurring character by producer Alan Bateman, and the character served as comic relief and busybody. She returned briefly in 1997 before returning as a regular on 23 September 1999 until May 2012. Colleen has been portrayed as the serial's "local gossip", a role that been well received by certain critics. Many storylines have centered on her over protective nature towards her son Lance Smart. Collingwood revealed that she often pitched storylines for Colleen in the hope they would play out on-screen. Collingwood decided to leave the series in January 2012 and Colleen departed on 23 May 2012. She made a brief return from 27 November 2012 and officially departed on 24 January 2013.

== Creation and casting ==
Colleen was introduced into the serial as a recurring character in 1988 until 1989. Colleen mainly served as a source of comic relief and acted as the busybody type character. Colleen was reintroduced again in 1999 with Collingwood reprising the role. In 2006, Collingwood stated that she was willing to stay with the serial for as long as they want her.

In May 2012, a writer for TV Week revealed Collingwood had left Home and Away. The actress filmed her final scenes a few months previously and the writer said viewers should have "a tissue box handy" for when they are broadcast. Of Collingwood's exit, her co-star Luke Mitchell said "It was very sad. She's been around nearly as long as Ray. I really enjoyed working with her and she's one of my favourite characters to watch on screen." Collingwood later explained her departure, stating that there were other things she wanted to do. She said "You get to a certain age and you don't know how much longer you'll be around, quite frankly, and my memory is still quite good – I don't know how long that's going to last!" Collingwood added that she will miss her co-stars, in particular Ada Nicodemou and Lynne McGranger. Collingwood made a brief return to Home and Away on 27 November.

== Development ==
The serial's official website describe Colleen stating: "Colleen is the town gossip, a sticky beak and quick to judge, but she also has a heart of gold. Her main claim to fame was winning the 'Miss Groper Pageant' [...] Colleen is chronically bossy and is not above brow-beating those she cares about, especially her beloved son Lance Smart (Peter Vroom), whom she dotes on." They also add: "She can be the source of information on everything that happens in Summer Bay." Collingwood has said that she likes Colleen's high and mighty behaviour stating: "I like the way she gets all snooty and high-handed and above herself."

Soap opera reporting website Holy Soap describe Colleen stating: "Colleen is the local gossip who always seem to put her foot in it." Whilst interviewed by media reporting website Digital Spy, Collingwood agreed that she shared traits with Colleen which were: "The Irishness and the old-fashioned thing and I guess everybody's a gossip to a certain extent." Of Colleen's chances of finding love again she stated: "As far as the romance goes, there hasn't been anything happening and I don't know when that next one will happen."

Collingwood has stated that she often pitches "crazy plots" for Colleen to the writers in the hope they will implement some. In 2006, she suggested that Colleen should go on a health kick, of this she states: "I had a vision of her and all her mates from the bowling club doing tai chi on the beach, the storyline seems to have come and gone though. It was actually used as an excuse for someone else to kiss somebody else!" She has also suggested the ideas of Colleen starting internet dating and an awkward date with Alf Stewart (Ray Meagher).

Exploration of the character's fictional backstory led to the introduction of her daughter Maureen Evans (Sally Cahill) in 2003. When Maureen comes to the Diner, it is revealed that Colleen had her adopted out after becoming pregnant while she was a teenager. Collingwood said to have her daughter come back into her life is "obviously a huge shock to Colleen", adding "To have this woman suddenly turn up out of the blue really throws her. There's a very emotional scene where the two women meet." Collingwood admitted that she had thought about the storyline a lot, as she knew people in real life that had met their biological mother later in life. She knew that there can be an awkwardness and it was not an easy situation. Colleen is initially suspicious of Maureen's motives for finding her, but later "lets her guard down" with her.

In March 2008, a new storyline exploring the Stewart family leads to the discovery that Colleen is in fact related to Alf Stewart and Morag Bellingham (Cornelia Frances). The revelation is prompted by the discovery of a time capsule from 1940, which "eager" residents believe they should open. Collingwood explained: "It gets opened and inside is a diary kept by one of the Stewarts. Morag reads that Alf and Morag's father had a brief affair with Colleen's mother – resulting in Colleen." While Colleen delights in her new status as a Stewart, Alf and Morag are seen struggling with the discovery and make it clear that they are not keen on the newest addition to the family. Collingwood told Carolyn Stewart of TV Week that the pair react with "shock and horror", and Morag even demands a DNA test because she cannot believe it is true. Collingwood said she and Frances had fun with the scene as they always enjoy raising their eyebrows at one another. Stewart wrote that "a surprise sibling" should not faze Alf, as several long-lost family had been introduced over the years. Scriptwriters also addressed the brief romance Alf had with Colleen's daughter Maureen, adding a scene in which Colleen says "You didn't go that far, did you?". Collingwood confirmed the reference to Maureen, before saying that they "skate over that" and move on. She also pointed out that the storyline puts an end to any romance between Colleen and Alf, something fans had demanded over the years. She said: "they have a relationship now but it's not the type of relationship fans expected. But there's initial confusion in the Bay so they do get an engagement party of sorts!"

== Storylines ==
=== 1988–1989 ===
Colleen was born in Summer Bay as the product of an affair between local businessman Gordon Stewart and Mavis Hickey. Merv Hickey, the man who Colleen believed was her father, was abusive to her and Mavis. Colleen grew up admiring and envying the Stewart family for the family structure she did not have. She is first seen in the general store where she is talking to Celia Stewart (Fiona Spence) and they become good friends and gossips. Colleen tells Pippa Fletcher (Vanessa Downing) that Carly Morris (Sharyn Hodgson) has been sexually assaulted before she gets a chance to, which annoys those around her. Colleen later reappears when her son, Lance wins $500,000 on the lottery and he gives some money to his father Les Smart (Kevin Golsby), who runs off with another woman, leaving Colleen devastated. Colleen, unable to remain living in the family home, moves with Lance into his new mobile home much to his chagrin.

Colleen starts feuding with Morag Bellingham (Frances) and enjoys insulting Roo Stewart (Justine Clarke). Floss McPhee (Sheila Kennelly) makes Colleen believe in horoscopes and she becomes convinced she should not be with Donald Fisher (Norman Coburn). Floss tries to help her to divorce Donald, and Lance becomes happy with this. He enlists Martin Dibble (Craig Thompson) to help him and they try to make it seem as if Donald is an alcoholic like Les so Colleen will be put off. Celia ruins the plan and gets drunk instead. Donald eventually gave in to Colleen and they become just good friends.

Colleen becomes friends with Lance's new girlfriend Marilyn Chambers (Emily Symons). Colleen causes more trouble for Roo when she spreads rumours that she is having an affair with Frank Morgan (Alex Papps) behind her cousin and Frank's wife Bobby's (Nicolle Dickson) back. Almost prophetically, Frank does ultimately leave Bobby for Roo sometime after. When, Lance later ends his relationship with Marilyn, she starts to dislike her and feuds with her. Marilyn tells Colleen that her constant meddling in Lance's life caused the break-up. When Lance confirms this, she leaves town to stay with her sister, Patricia in Cairns.

=== 1997–2013 ===
Colleen makes a brief one-episode return in 1997, babysitting Rachel McGregor (Kelly Glaister). She also encourages Selina Roberts (Tempany Deckert) to contact her mother, Dawn (Kim Deacon). Colleen is not seen for another two years but is referred to as still living in the caravan park in Lance's old mobile home. She helps Marilyn and Donald out whilst they are in America with their ill child Byron. Justine Welles (Bree Desborough) helps Colleen team up with the locals to stop the Caravan park from being redeveloped. Colleen gets a job at the Diner where she becomes good friends with Leah Poulos (Ada Nicodemou). She later helps Sally Fletcher (Kate Richie) as she exposes her fiancé Kieran Fletcher (Spencer McLaren) of his attempted affair with Gypsy Nash (Kimberley Cooper). Lance returns and Colleen is delighted, however she soon sets about making her dislike of his new wife Debbie (Kelly Butler) known. Les (now played by Rob Steele) returns and Colleen takes him in, they decide to renew their vows again after they grow close once more. However, when Colleen insists Les gets a job, he tries to avoid doing so. Les later steals Colleen's secret savings and leaves with caravan park guest Rhonda Davies (Lynda Stoner), breaking Colleen's heart once again. Colleen starts looking after granddaughter Maggie a lot, but when Debbie finds out, she tries to stop Colleen seeing her altogether. Leah eventually talks her around and they become friends.

Colleen causes a chip-pan fire at the Diner, she throws water over it and burns the Diner down. Leah takes the blame for Colleen. Eventually the guilt becomes too much and she tries to confess to Ailsa Stewart (Judy Nunn), but Leah prevents her. Ailsa later tells Colleen she knew it was her fault all along, before she dies. Colleen later reveals she had a daughter out of wedlock when she was 15 and gave her up for adoption. Max Sutherland (Sebastian Elmaloglou) later uses Colleen's bank account to store money in from his book proceeds. Colleen has legal action taken against her over the books copyright status, she covers for Max. Her daughter, Maureen Evans (Cahill) turns up and Colleen initially thinks she just wants to cash in on her newfound fame. She soon realises Maureen is genuine and they become close, but decides after some time it would be better to keep in touch from a distance and Maureen leaves. Josh West (Daniel Collopy) tries to get rid of her mobile home, so she leaves town but later returns.

Colleen meets Norman Shadbolt (David Whitford); they date and later get engaged. He later leaves her a note saying he couldn't go through with it. Colleen starts feuding with Madge Wilkins over a historian job for the paper. Colleen helps Sally after Flynn Saunders' (Joel McIlroy) death, actually managing to keep the news of his illness a secret. Colleen later finds out she is related to the Stewart family after her mother had an affair with their father. Morag hates the idea of being related to her. She later becomes annoyed at Colleen's interfering with their private affairs. Colleen refuses to accept Martha MacKenzie's (Jodi Gordon) relationship with Hugo Austin (Bernard Curry). This causes a series of arguments in the Stewart family over Colleen's meddling. She later sees that Martha is trying to find happiness again and they make up.

Colleen is trapped in the Diner when it is fire bombed. She gets over the incident quickly to support old friend Leah, who cannot not cope. She is angry when Marilyn returns to town, stating she still has not forgiven her for the breakdown of her and Lance's relationship. When she finds out that Marilyn has cancer, she changes her attitude towards her and they become friendly again. Penn Graham (Christian Clark) starts up a campaign against Alf and the other residents of Summer Bay. Items begin to go missing from the caravan park. He plants them in Colleen's trailer, to make it look like she has stolen them. She is arrested and spends the night in the cells. She is later released and Charlie Buckton (Esther Anderson) vows to find out the truth. Roo (Georgie Parker) returns to the Bay and Colleen reminds her of her past behaviour. She continues to opine that Roo cannot shake her past, until Alf tells her to stop. Colleen serves as Matron of Honour at Gina Austin (Sonia Todd) and John Palmer's (Shane Withington) wedding.

The River Boys come to Summer Bay and Brodie Upton (Guy Edmonds) gets on the wrong side of Colleen. She kicks him and a friend out of the Diner and tells Charlie that she was threatened. Brodie tries to apologise to Colleen, but she refuses to accept it. Brodie later drives off with Colleen's caravan while she is still in it. This leaves Colleen scared to return to the caravan alone, but Morag helps her overcome her anxiety. Colleen begins attending a victims of crime meeting and she meets Keith Irwin (Alan Lovell). Colleen and Keith begin dating, but when Keith is arrested for marijuana possession, Colleen ends their relationship. Colleen starts gossiping about Reverend Elijah Johnson's (Jay Laga'aia) relationship with Laura Carmody (Roxanne Wilson). When she is hit by lightning, Colleen is rendered speechless. Elijah visits her and Colleen believes God is punishing her for spreading rumours. Colleen feels guilty about Elijah's departure from the Church and she attempts to save the local shelter to get him to reconsider.

A storm hits the bay and Colleen shelters at the school. She is trapped in the toilets when the roof caves in, but is rescued when the rubble is cleared. Colleen is upset when she learns Lance is moving to Las Vegas for work. She worries that she will never see him or Maggie again and reveals that she gave Lance all her money so she could move in with him. Marilyn, Roo, Leah and Irene buy her a ticket to the Gold Coast, so she can visit Lance and talk. Colleen and her Toby Jugs are featured in the paper and she decides to auction them. However, Jett James (Will McDonald) breaks into Colleen's caravan and break the jugs while he is looking for money. Marilyn helps clean things up and she finds a winning lottery ticket, which she gives to Colleen, convincing her to spend the money wisely. Lance invites his mother to move to Las Vegas with him, and Marilyn and Roo throw Colleen a farewell party before she departs for the airport. Colleen returns for Roo's wedding to Harvey Ryan (Marcus Graham) and later helps treat Harvey's chicken pox. She later returns home when Alf gets fed up with having his sisters around.

== Reception ==
For her portrayal of Colleen, Collingwood was nominated in the category of "Funniest Performance" at the 2007 Inside Soap Awards. Holy Soap recall Colleen's most memorable moment as being: "Trying to cop off with Summer Bay legend Don Fisher, a.k.a. Flathead – to no avail." Sarah Ellis writing for Inside Soap commented on Colleen's status as a gossip stating: "When it comes to soap gossips, Colleen Smart is the undisputed tittle-tattle queen." The Press Association have referred to Colleen as an "elderly busy-body". While discussing resident busybodies in soaps, Jackie Brygel of the Herald Sun wrote "Summer Bay's is none other than the frighteningly cheery Colleen, a woman who has clearly never, ever heard of the term mind your own business." Brygel later stated that Colleen was "a woman whose painfulness and irritating nature knows no bounds".

Whilst in character as Borat, actor Sacha Baron Cohen stated he loves Australian television and that his favourite character is Colleen Smart, jokingly adding: "I would like to make romance inside of her." The Sydney Morning Herald have referred to Colleen as one of the serial's three "legacy characters", along with Alf and Irene. After she was given a new love interest in 2011, a critic for the Daily Record stated "If there's one Summer Bay resident whose love life has had more ups and downs than the teenagers', it's Colleen Smart. Surely she deserves a break when it comes to the romance stakes but apparently that break's not about to come anytime soon. Instead, she's in for more heartache."

Collingwood's performance as Colleen once made a reporter from Inside Soap cry. They stated that "while Coleen Smart has always been one of the Bay's funniest characters it's been great to see Lyn Collingwood, who plays her, being given a chance to show her dramatic side in the storyline centring on Colleen's gambling addiction." In November 2021, three critics for The West Australian placed Colleen at number 49 in their feature on the "Top 50 heroes we love and villains we hate" from Home and Away. Of the character, they stated: "Summer Bay's busybody, Colleen couldn't keep her nose out of other people's business. Colleen's peers were Alf Stewart and his sisters Morag and Celia — she later found out they were her half-siblings. Forever unintentionally causing trouble, Colleen's biggest faux pas was when she burnt down Ailsa's beloved dinner. Leah took the blame."
