= Hayley Smith (Home and Away) =

- Home and Away character
- Rebecca Cartwright as Hayley (2005)
- Portrayed by: Rebecca Cartwright (1998–2005); Ella Scott Lynch (2005); Eliza Wyvill (flashback)
- Duration: 1998–2005
- First appearance: 28 September 1998
- Last appearance: 25 November 2005
- Introduced by: John Holmes
- Book appearances: Home and Away: The Long Goodbye; Home and Away: Mayday
- Spin-off appearances: Home and Away: Secrets and the City (2002); Home and Away: Hearts Divided (2003)
- Ella Scott Lynch as Hayley (2005)
In-universe information
- Other names: Hayley Lawson
- Occupation: Artist; Student; Gym worker Bar owner
- Father: Ken Smith
- Mother: Eve Smith
- Brothers: Will Smith; Nick Smith
- Husband: Noah Lawson (2004); Scott Hunter (2007–)
- Sons: Noah Hunter
- Nieces: Lily Smith

Hayley Rose Smith (also Lawson) is a fictional character from the Australian soap opera Home and Away. She was portrayed from September 1998 to September 2005 by actress Rebecca Cartwright and from September to November 2005 by Ella Scott Lynch, after Cartwright left the show for personal reasons.

== Casting ==
In May 2005, Cartwright announced she would be leaving Home and Away for personal reasons. The announcement came one week after she confirmed she was pregnant with her first child. Cartwright said the decision had been hard, but she found that she could not continue in the role. She explained, "I will always remember my days on Home and Away as the best of my life. But at such an important time of my life, I need more time and flexibility away from the day to day demands of the production schedule." Cartwright filmed her final scenes in June, and remained on air until September 2005.

It was also announced that the role of Hayley was set to be recast. The Seven Network's head of drama, John Holmes, said the character was "integral" to the show. Cartwright stated that she was "pleased that the character of Hayley will live on". Scott Ellis of The Sun-Herald later reported that over one hundred actresses auditioned for the role of Hayley. Producer Julie McGauran told Ellis that there had been "a couple of impressive contenders". On 5 June 2005, it was announced that actress Ella Scott Lynch had been cast as Hayley. Scott Lynch said she was both "excited and a little daunted" about joining the show as an already established character.

== Storylines ==
Hayley is the daughter of Ken (Anthony Phelan) and Eve Smith (Robyn Gibbes) and the sister of Will (Zac Drayson) and Nick Smith (Matt Juarez; Chris Egan). After Eve suffers psychological problems and Ken descends into alcoholism, the children are placed in foster care. Will leaves and Hayley runs away to join him living with Irene Roberts (Lynne McGranger).

Hayley quickly befriends Sam Marshall (Ryan Clark) and they begin to graffiti tag various areas in the Bay. They begin dating. While out walking one day, the couple are taken hostage by a drifter named Murray (Scott Major) who held up the diner. They are eventually rescued by Will. Hayley and Sam continue tagging until their friend Brian Matthews (Scott Swalwell) dies in a fall. Shortly after, Ken reappears and Hayley is keen to reconnect with him but Will isn't so easily swayed and is still hostile towards him. Ken leaves but later returns permanently and falls for Irene.

Hayley soon finds herself in a love triangle with Sam and the newly arrived Mitch McColl (Cameron Welsh). She eventually chooses Mitch. Their relationship lasts until Mitch reveals that he slept with Gypsy Nash (Kimberley Cooper). Soon after Nick rejoins the family and things appear to be going well until Ken is killed when a car he is working on, crushes him after a jack slips. Hayley slides into a downward spiral and is nearly attacked at a nightclub one evening. Noah Lawson (Beau Brady) is on the scene to save her and they ride off on his motorbike. They soon begin a relationship.

After failing Year 12 due to the stress of Ken's death, Hayley decides to repeat and Noah joins her. School principal Donald Fisher (Norman Coburn) asks her to do the illustrations for his Children's book Letter to Byron dedicated to his late son. When the book is launched, Hayley sees a vision of Ken in the crowd.

Hayley's relationship with Noah is tested when she catches him kissing Skye Patterson (Angela Keep) at her 18th birthday party and soon after Noah spirals into alcoholism and matters are not helped when Hayley befriends Noah's overly-religious mother, Jill (Tracy Mann).

When Donald goes to launch his book in London, he invites Hayley, Irene, Will and Nick join him on the trip. While there Hayley meets a porter, Robbie Jamison (Rupert Evans) and falls for him and they have one date. Robbie asks Hayley to stay with him in London but she declines, realising she still loves Noah. After arriving home, Hayley reconciles with Noah.

Hayley and Noah later move into their own place together which they name "The Palace". After Hayley kisses her housemate Josh West (Daniel Collopy), she and Noah split but remain housemates. Hayley's relationship with Josh does not last very long after Alf Stewart (Ray Meagher) tells her of his visions of Hayley marrying Josh and becoming unhappy.

Hayley's next relationship is with her friend Alex Poulos (Danny Raco), which lasts several months but when Alex develops a steroid addiction and Brodie Hanson (Susie Rugg), Alex's ex-girlfriend returns things are strained. Hayley and Brodie soon find themselves at loggerheads and both are seriously injured in a car crash after an argument. Hayley is later left disfigured and has lost her memory. Alex and Brodie try to break the news to Hayley that they are back together but are unable to do so and give her a story that they are both going away for a while. Hayley slowly regains her memory and Noah is there to comfort her.

On her 21st birthday, Hayley receives a proposal from Noah and she accepts. The couple later marry in an outdoor ceremony where Ken reappears to Hayley as she walks down the aisle. Kane (Sam Atwell) and Kirsty Phillips (Christie Hayes) also renew their vows on the day. Their marriage is cut short when Noah is shot dead in an armed siege with Sarah Lewis (Luisa Hastings-Edge), leaving Hayley widowed. After finding paintings that seemingly appear at the palace, Hayley begins to become confused despite the fact she painted them. Kit Hunter (Amy Mizzi) tells Hayley that she stole the paintings the previous year and a vision of Noah told her to return the paintings.

Hayley finds herself in a love triangle with Scott Hunter (Kip Gamblin) and Kim Hyde (Chris Hemsworth). She later falls pregnant and is unsure who the father is. The baby is initially believed to be Kim's and Scott steps aside. However, Hayley is still in love with Scott, but plans to marry Kim. On the day of the day of the wedding, Hayley runs away and Scott searches for her and eventually finds her as she goes into labour. Hayley then gives birth to a baby boy and names him after Noah. By the end of the year, it is revealed that Kim is not Noah's father, as his blood type does not match the child. Scott is thrilled to be a father and he and Hayley leave for a new life in France.

== Reception ==
Described by The Sun-Herald's Scott Ellis and Tom Findlay as one of the "best-loved characters in Australian drama", Cartwright won the 2005 Logie Award for Most Popular Actress for her portrayal of Hayley. She was also nominated for a Gold Logie the same year.

When Hayley and Noah broke up, Jackie Brygel of the Herald Sun wrote "Hayley, a chickadee who has made some dumb decisions in her short life, finally sees the light. She realises her bloke Noah is on a fast track to nowhere and dumps him." James Joyce of the Newcastle Herald dubbed Hayley "Summer Bay's resident angelic blonde". Rachel Browne from The Sun-Herald described the character as "trouble-prone", while Tony Davis of The Sydney Morning Herald called her "an artistic young widow who has overcome a graffiti problem".

When Lynch was cast as Hayley, Gordon Farrer of The Age wrote about how difficult it was for the cast and audience to get used to a new actress in the role. He commented: "while she's still in the hospital get-up she's now a red-head, with a totally different nose, and... you want to leap up and shout at the telly, 'she's an imposter, mate, don't get sucked in, she's up to no good.' And then someone else comes in and calls the redhead 'Hayley', and then another, and you realise you must've gone mad, because the only other explanation is that they've all gone mad, but that'd be like something out of Days of Our Lives, and this is Home and Away, a far superior soap".
