= Will Smith (Home and Away) =

Home and Away character

- Home and Away character
- Portrayed by: Zac Drayson
- Duration: 1998–2005, 2010–11
- First appearance: 13 February 1998
- Last appearance: 8 February 2011
- Introduced by: John Holmes (1998); Julie McGauran (2003–05); Cameron Welsh (2010)
In-universe information
- Occupation: Student (1998–2000); Coxswain
- Father: Ken Smith
- Mother: Eve Smith
- Brothers: Nick Smith
- Sisters: Hayley Smith
- Wife: Gypsy Nash (2002–11)
- Daughters: Lily Smith
- Adoptive daughters: Rachel McGregor
- Nephews: Noah Smith

William Smith is a fictional character from the Australian soap opera Home and Away, played by Zac Drayson. He made his first on-screen appearance on 13 February 1998. Will was a regular on the show from 1998 to 2002. He continued to make frequent guest appearances until 2005. In 2010, it was announced that the character and Drayson would be returning to the show. Will returned to the series as a guest with his daughter on 14 October 2010. On 7 February 2011, Will was finally revealed to have been the murderer of Penn Graham after a long running storyline. He left the series on 8 February 2011.

== Casting ==
Drayson was originally cast in the role of Tom Nash, but at the last minute the show's producers thought he would be more suited to the "rougher" upcoming role of Will. Drayson played Will for four years from 1998. The character left Summer Bay after marrying Gypsy Nash (Kimberley Cooper). Drayson made occasional guest appearances in the show from 2003 to 2005.

In September 2010, it was revealed that Drayson had reprised his role of Will and would be returning to Home and Away. Drayson revealed that a friend of his is a producer on the show and asked him about coming back. Drayson has said that he is going to be around for a while, but he is not signed for three or four years. Will arrives in town with his daughter, Lily (Charlie Rose Maclennan), to visit his former foster mother, Irene Roberts (Lynne McGranger) after his marriage suffers problems. On his character's return, Drayson said "He and Gypsy are going through a rough patch, so he comes home to clear his head. They're not divorced - they're just having a break." He added "Being back is great, it really did feel like coming home."

== Character development ==
Will was originally described as a "hot-tempered trouble maker" who arrives in the Bay to reconnect with his siblings, Hayley (Rebecca Hewitt) and Nick (Chris Egan). Will learns to calm down and when he decides to leave the Bay he was, by then, considered a "good bloke". Will worked for Alf Stewart (Ray Meagher) and he managed to get his coxswain's licence. He also had a close relationship with Irene Roberts and he and his siblings lived with her at the Beach House.

When Will returns in 2010, his marriage to Gypsy has broken down as they began drifting apart. Will decides to go back to Summer Bay and spend time with Irene. Will is now described as a "loving father" who would do anything for his daughter, Lily. However, his temper occasionally gets the better of him. On playing Will, Drayson said "I love playing Will and I think there is something new in Will, he's a bit rougher around the edges, he's a lot more confused and gets into more trouble. I think he tries really hard to be a good Dad, but he gets lost in his own things like most humans do I suppose."

When Penn Graham (Christian Clark) is murdered, Will becomes a suspect. He later tells Robert Robertson (Socrattis Otto) that Alf might be responsible. However Will knows more than he was letting on so he runs away, describing Will ordeal Drayson states: "Will knows more about Penn's death than meets the eye, he lied about Alf being involved, though we don't yet know what his motives are. It could be that he's covering up for himself or someone else, or it could be something totally different - but he's certainly got something to hide." Irene tries to convince Will to do the right thing, but he cannot think clear, describing Will's state of mind during the storyline Drayson adds: "Will is under a lot of pressure and not thinking clearly, he doesn't know what lies in store, and is on a real downward spiral. He has some tough choices to make in the hours ahead. Lilly means everything to Will, He's trying to be a good dad, but unfortunately doesn't go about it the right way. He's way out of his depth, basically"

== Storylines ==
Will came from a broken home, his father Ken (Anthony Phelan) was an alcoholic and his mother Eve (Robin Gibbes) was violent and ended up in a mental home. After running away from a foster home and ending up on the streets, Will meets up with Damian Roberts (Matt Doran) and learns that his mother Irene was in the habit of taking in children. He arrives Summer Bay and on Irene's doorstep, claiming Damian had said he could stay. Will tries to reunite his family, specifically his younger siblings Hayley and Nick. He sets about try to clear Irene's house by encouraging Chloe Richards (Kristy Wright) to move in with her boyfriend James Fraser (Michael Piccirilli) and tries to drive a rift between Irene and Joey Rainbow (Alex O'Han) by telling them both that the other has been badmouthing them. This fails as Hayley and Nick are happy in foster care and Will apologises for his actions and agrees to stay on at Irene's house. Will is not happy as one of the conditions of his stay is he has to return to school, but he quickly becomes good friends with his classmate Sam Marshall (Ryan Clark). Will takes an interest in Gypsy but their relationship is hampered by the fact that her father, Joel Nash (David Woodley), was the new PE teacher and clashed with Will on his first day. Joel soon warms to Will and encourages him to try out for the school javelin team. Annoyed at the idea of her boyfriend and her father being friends, Gypsy tells Will that Joel is only interested in him because he could win him trophies, so Will deliberately gets himself disqualified from a competition. He and Joel eventually iron out their differences, especially when Joel helps clear him when he is accused of robbing a stallholder.

Will and Gypsy's relationship is frequently tested, such as both being grilled after they were locked in the school overnight after sneaking away at a concert. They fall out after Will is dismissive after their first attempt of intimacy. Gypsy becomes jealous when she sees him hanging around with a new girl. The girl is revealed to be his sister Hayley who left her foster parents and decided to come and live with him. Joey is diagnosed with schizophrenia and Will helps Irene cope with the fallout. When Irene leaves to visit her daughter Finlay (Tina Thomsen), Will, Hayley and Joey stay with Ailsa Stewart (Judy Nunn). When Ailsa's son Duncan (Brendan McKensy) frames Joey for taking a meat cleaver and Ailsa asks him to leave, Will insists on going with him, although he is not so convinced about Joey's state of mind to let Hayley come with them, until she realises what Duncan has done. Nick turns up on the run from some drug dealers and is beaten up as a result, Will urges Nick's foster parents not to give up on him.

Will supports Gypsy when she succumbs to alcoholism after her kidnap ordeal at the hands of David D'Angelo (Toni Poli), her tutor who used the pseudonym Robert Perez. He dates Peta Janossi (Aleetza Wood) and helps cover for her upon learning her grandmother had died and she and her brother David ware living alone. Irene finds out and arranges for Peta to stay with the Nashes. However, Will is clearly still hung up on Gypsy and he and Peta break up and he reunites with Gypsy. His father Ken turns up, much to Will's annoyance. He is concerned when Ken begins seeing Irene and, when he begins drinking again, Will and Hayley force him to leave until he recovers. Ken returns some months later, having sobered up and successfully lobbies for Nick to return. Will eventually accepts his father has changed and the pair strike up a close relationship.

After learning Gypsy has been cheating on him with rich kid Charlie Nicholas (Toby Schmitz), Will is furious and vandalises the school field with a motorbike and is given community service as a result. Will sets his sights on Dani Sutherland (Tammin Sursok) who is new in Summer Bay. Their relationship suffers its first test when Tara Mills becomes infatuated with Will after he helps her out. Will is happy when Ken and Irene become engaged but it is not to be as Ken is killed when a jack slips under the car he is working on, leaving him crushed. Will blames himself as he lifted the car off Ken which released the pressure, quickening his death. Will then takes his role as man of the house seriously by dropping out of school and working for Alf as a deckhand. Hayley and Nick are annoyed when he tries to be a father figure to them but Irene persuades him to stop.

Will's relationship with Dani hits a rough patch when she becomes jealous of him spending time with Gypsy. Will and Gypsy sleep together but he returns to Dani and supports her after she is raped by Kane Phillips (Sam Atwell). Will is forced to admit in court that Dani had said it wasn't Kane's fault and Kane is acquitted. He learns he is the father of Gypsy's unborn baby after months of her keeping it from him. Dani finds out while Will is away in London and on his return she initially breaks up with him before giving him another chance. However, it becomes clear Gypsy will always have to come first to Will and they split up for good. Will and Gypsy then reunite and get engaged shortly after their daughter, Lily is born at the roadside. Will then takes a job in Queensland, close to Gypsy's family. As they are unable to get a marriage license; Will and Gypsy have an unofficial ceremony before legally marrying the following month in Queensland.

Will continues to make various reappearances. He returns to the Bay when he and Gypsy begin having problems and considers getting back together with Dani who is now dating Scott Hunter (Kip Gamblin). He is horrified to find Kane back in the Bay and seemingly accepted by Irene and everyone else. Will then returns home to salvage his marriage. He returns the following year for Hayley's wedding to Noah Lawson (Beau Brady), where he reveals to Jesse that his daughter Rachel, who had been staying with the Nashes, has asked him and Gypsy to adopt her. After mulling it over, Jesse agrees. Will is next seen at Alf's 60th birthday and then again for Hayley's abortive wedding to Kim Hyde (Chris Hemsworth). Will returns to the Bay with his daughter, Lily. Penn Graham is murdered and Will is eventually revealed to have committed the crime. It is learned Will stabbed Penn in self-defence and he is charged and his fate remains ambiguous.
