= Brett Hicks-Maitland =

Australian actor (born 1978)

- Born: 11 March 1978 (age 48); Adelaide, South Australia
- Occupation: Actor
- Years active: 2001–present

Brett Hicks-Maitland, also credited as Brett Archer (born 11 March 1978, in Adelaide) is an Australian actor. He is best known for his role in the Australian television series Home and Away.

== Training ==
Hicks-Maitland studied acting at the Australia's National Institute of Dramatic Art (NIDA) in Sydney. He graduated in 2000 with a Bachelor of Dramatic Arts. He's since continued his studies of acting with Australian Acting Coach Annie Swann and Camera technique teacher Sandra Lee Patterson. Since moving to America he has studied with Howard Fine and Larry Moss.

== Career ==
Hicks-Maitland has been involved in a number of TV shows, including top Australian soap "Home and Away" as a Series Regular playing Dylan Russell from 2002 to 2004. He has made appearances on the mini-series "Small Claims – the reunion", and ABC's "Changi". He played guest roles on "All Saints", "McLeod's Daughters", "Packed to the Rafters" and "Life Support" (series #3).

In the film "the Longer Day of Happiness" he starred as Garret Jones. In the Australian Film "Dirty Deeds" starring Sam Neill, Sam Worthington and John Goodman, Brett co-starred as Officer Young.

Hicks-Maitland has been involved in many Theater productions, most recently with "Noises Off" at the State Theater of South Austral, "Loot" at the Cat and Fiddle (Sydney, Australia) and "The Eumenedies" at NIDA. Hicks-Maitland has also been involved in a number of short films, his most recent being an animated Short, "Ward 13" in which he played the lead voice.

== Filmography ==
Year	Title	Role	Notes
2000	Drama School	Himself	Documentary series (9 episodes)
2001	Changi	Bede	Miniseries (1 episode)
2001	McLeod's Daughters	Hopeful	Season 1, Episode 11
2001	All Saints	Jamie Books	Season 4, Episode 38
2002	All Saints	Marcus Drayton	Season 5, Episode 5
2002	Dirty Deeds	Constable	Feature film
2002–04	Home and Away	Dylan Russell	Seasons 15–17 (recurring, 67 episodes)
2002	Home and Away: Secrets and the City	Dylan Russell	Special
2003	Ward 13	(Voice)	Short film
2003	Life Support	(unnamed role)	Season 3, Episode 10
2003	Big Space	Squirt / Guy	Video short
2006	Small Claims: The Reunion	Shane	TV movie
2008	All Saints	Leon Warner	Season 11, Episode 23
2008	Packed to the Rafters	Patrick Moreton	Season 1, Episode 8 (uncredited role)
2010	Do Not Disconnect	Eric	Short film
2011	Paradigm Shift	Detective Russell	Short film
2011	Got Home Alive	Ashley McDonald	Season 1, Episode 2
2012	The Longer Day of Happiness	Garret Jones	Feature film
2013	The Cheerleader Diaries	Coach Liam Fox	Season 1, Episodes 4, 8 & 10
2019	The Hunting	Constable Hennessey	Season 1, Episodes 2 & 3
2022	The Stranger	Crooked Cop	Feature film
TBA	Ghost Town	Drew Clark	Short film

== Interests ==
Hicks-Maitland is an avid golfer. Was an In-Line skater of professional standard and played ice-hockey in his home town of Adelaide, Australia. He continues to work and study acting in Los Angeles.
