= Lyn Collingwood =

Australian actress (born 1936)

Lyn Collingwood OAM
- Born: 6 September 1936 (age 90); Sydney, New South Wales, Australia
- Education: University of Sydney
- Occupations: Actress, writer, theatre director
- Years active: 1963; 1979–present
- Known for: Home and Away as Colleen Smart (1988-1989, 1997, 1999-2012, 2013)
- Children: 1

Lyn Collingwood (born 6 September 1936 in Sydney, Australia), credited also as Lynn Collingwood, is an Australian actress, writer and theatre director.

She has appeared in television and film roles, as well as worked in theatre as an actress and director. She is best known for her role in the TV series Home and Away as sticky-beak comic relief character Colleen Smart Stewart, where she became well known for her trademark catchphrase "Yoo Hoo, It's Only Me".

== Early life ==
Collingwood was born in Sydney, New South Wales on 6 September 1936. She attended the University of Sydney, where she acted in undergraduate stage productions alongside John Bell and Richard Ward.

Collingwood after graduating university worked as an English, drama and history teacher for seven years and as a social worker.

== Career ==
=== Early career ===
While teaching, she conducted school plays, which lead to her performing in an Australian musical, upon which the director encouraged her to hire a talent agent, which lead to acting work in television commercials.

Collingwood appeared in a film short in the early 1960s, before appearing in a few TV roles from the late 1970s. One of her early roles was a guesting part in popular local soap opera Number 96.

=== Home and Away ===
She became most known however, when she was cast in serial Home and Away as recurring gossip comic character Colleen Smart (later Stewart) in 1988 to 1989. In 1997 she returned for a guest appearance, before returning again in 1999, this time as a regular character, remaining a permanent member of the cast for the next 14 years until leaving in May 2012, to concentrate on writing and directing. She did however make a return to the series in November 2012, before departing again in 2013. She has since stated that she has no intention of returning to Home and Away, feeling she is now too old to do so.

=== Television and film roles ===
Collingwood has had guest roles in numerous other TV serials including A Country Practice, Rafferty's Rules, E Street, G.P. Spellbinder, Murder Call and All Saints. Other small-screen credits include 2015 online sitcom A Shared House and an episode of Remember My Name, playing the role of Grandma Doris.

Collingwood's film credits include Palm Beach (1979), alongside Bryan Brown, ...Maybe This Time (1980), opposite Bill Hunter and Judy Morris, TV movie Chase Through the Night (1983), alongside Nicole Kidman and John Jarratt and A Test of Love (1984), opposite Angela Punch McGregor. Further credits include 1985 family TV film Archer’s Adventure, once again with Nicole Kidman, 1986 dystopian Ozploitation film Dead End Drive-In, and later, a small role in 2009 film The Makeover, opposite her former Home and Away cast mate Martin Dingle-Wall. In 2013, she appeared in short film Worm.

=== Theatre ===
Collingwood has also performed in theatre production's, joining Sydney's New Theatre in 1980. In 2009, she founded 'Players in the Pub', a company presenting play readings, in which she both acts and directs. She more recently appeared in a production of Marat/Sade at New Theatre in 2016.

=== Publications and other works ===
Collingwood has also worked in research and was an editor of The Australian Encyclopaedia, as well as a sole updater of the 21st Century Junior World Encyclopedia and the 30-volume Everyman's New Age Encyclopedia. She was also a project developer on the Cambridge Encyclopedia of Australia. Additionally, she worked as a book editor, primarily for publisher Hale & Iremonger, compiling their annual An Australian Woman's Diary.

Collingwood is also a historian and writer and member of the Glebe Society. In 2017, she launched a website detailing the history of Sydney's New Theatre.

In 2025, Collingwood wrote a book about the history of Dover Heights, the Sydney suburb where she grew up, titled Dover Heights: Rocks and Sand They Couldn't Sell.

== Personal life ==
Collingwood has one daughter.

In 2025, a death hoax rumour started circulating on Facebook, stating that Collingwood had died after a long illness. She later addressed the rumour to New Idea magazine.

== Filmography ==
=== Film ===
Year	Title	Role	Notes	Ref.
1963	It Droppeth as the Gentle Rain		Short film	
1980	Palm Beach	Mrs. Adams	Feature film	
1980	...Maybe This Time	Myrtle	Feature film	
1982	A Dangerous Summer	Woman in Van	Feature film	
1984	Annie's Coming Out (aka A Test of Love)	Mrs. O'Farrell	Feature film	
1986	Dead End Drive-In	Fay	Feature film	
1990	Call Me Mr. Brown	Woman Caller at Phone Box	Feature film	
1994	Cops and Robbers	Boss	Feature film	
1995	From Sand to Celluloid: Round Up	Matron	Short film	
2009	The Makeover	Gran on Beach		
2013	Worm	Aunty Beth	Short film	

=== Television ===
Year	Title	Role	Notes	Ref.
	Number 96			
1979	Patrol Boat	Swain's Wife	Season 1, episode 6	
1980	People Like Us	Maisie Stanley	TV movie	
1981	Bellamy	Mrs. Marks	Season 1, episode 1	
1982	Spring & Fall	Sister	Season 2, episode 2	
1983	Chase Through the Night	Mrs. Y.	TV movie	
1985	Possession	Iris Dawson	Season 1	
1985	Archer (aka Archer's Adventure)	Shoekeeper	TV movie	
1987	The Harp in the South	Nursing Sister	Miniseries, 3 episodes	
1987	Rafferty's Rules	Janine Graham	Season 3, episode 4	
1987, 1990	A Country Practice	June Nunn	Season 7, episode 42	
1987, 1990	A Country Practice	Jean Quigley	Season 10, episode 20	
1988–1989, 1997, 1999–2013	Home and Away	Colleen Smart	Seasons 1–2 (recurring), Season 10 (guest); Seasons 12–25 (regular), Season 25–26 (guest) (Note: Collingwood departed the series during the 25th season in 2012, but did return in a guest role towards the end of the season, and remained until the beginning of the 26th season in 2013.)	
1989	E Street	Mrs. Wilson	Season 1, episode 1	
1989	E Street	Mrs. Jenkins	Season 1, episode 50	
1990	The Money or the Gun		Season 2, episode 10	
1991	G.P.	Marge Slater	Season 3, episode 6	
1995	Spellbinder	Nurse	Season 1, episode 15	
1997	Murder Call	Mother Agnes	Season 1, episode 12: "Wages of Sin"	
1999	All Saints	Laraine Parkes	Season 2, episode 5	
2002	Home and Away: Secrets and the City	Colleen Smart	Direct-to-video special	
2016	A Shared House	Helen	Season 2, episode 1	
2022	Remember My Name	Grandma Doris	Season 1, episode 3	

== Theatre ==
=== As actor ===
Year	Title	Role	Notes	Ref.
1975	A Bunch of Ratbags		The Australian Theatre, Sydney	
1979	The Sea	Mafanwy Price	Nimrod Theatre, Sydney	
1980	And I Still Call Home Australia	Stage Manager / Ronald MacDonald's Victim / Miss Fiske	New Theatre, Sydney	
1981	Flexitime	Beryl	Phillip St Theatre, Sydney	
1981	Goldilocks and the Three Bears		Phillip St Theatre, Sydney	
1982	Amadeus	Teresa Salieri	Theatre Royal Sydney with STC	
1985	Yobbo Nowt	Marie	New Theatre, Sydney	
1987	An Enemy of the People		New Theatre, Sydney	
1990	The Government Investigator		Q Theatre, Penrith	
1992	A Hard God		Ensemble Theatre, Sydney	
1992	Traitors		New Theatre, Sydney	
1992	Macbeth		New Theatre, Sydney	
1993	Cloud 9		New Theatre, Sydney	
1993	The One Day of the Year		Riverina Playhouse, Wagga Wagga	
1994	The Family		Cremorne Theatre, Brisbane, Ensemble Theatre, Sydney with QTC	
1996	Kafka's Dick		Melbourne Athenaeum	
1997	The Season at Sarsaparilla	Girlie Pogson	New Theatre, Sydney	
1998	Love for Love		Sydney Opera House with STC	
2001	Les Liaisons Dangereuses		New Theatre, Sydney	
2002	Fairy Tales of Oscar Wilde		New Theatre, Sydney	
2002	Stop Laughing, This is Serious: 70 years of Review at the New Theatre		New Theatre, Sydney	
2003	The Killing of Sister George	June Buckeridge	New Theatre, Sydney	
2015	Medea		Roxbury Hotel, Sydney with Players in the Pub	
2016	Marat/Sade	Madame Coulmier	New Theatre, Sydney	
2024	That's Murder! and Other Plays		The Harold, Sydney with Players in the Pub	
2024	Sherlock Holmes		The Harold, Sydney with Players in the Pub	
2024	All the World's a Stage		The Harold, Sydney with Players in the Pub	
2025	Under Milk Wood		The Harold, Sydney with Players in the Pub	
2025	Les Femmes Savantes (The Learned Ladies)		The Harold, Sydney with Players in the Pub	

=== As director ===
Year	Title	Role	Notes	Ref.
2002	Stop Laughing, This is Serious – 70 Years of Review at the New Theatre	Director	New Theatre, Sydney	
2002	One Flew Over The Cuckoo's Nest	Director	New Theatre, Sydney	
2004	Hating Alison Ashley	Director	New Theatre, Sydney	
2004	A Christmas Carol	Adaptor / Director	New Theatre, Sydney	
2005	Manly Mates	Director	New Theatre, Sydney	
2013	An Ideal Husband	Director	Roxbury Hotel, Sydney with Players in the Pub	
2020	Bleak House	Director	Toxteth Hotel, Sydney with Players in the Pub	
2022	Hedda Gabler	Director	The Friend in Hand, Sydney with Players in the Pub	
2023	Reedy River	Director	Broken Hill with New Theatre, Sydney	
2025	Lady Charing is Cross	Director	The Harold, Sydney with Players in the Pub	
