= Christopher Egan =

Australian actor

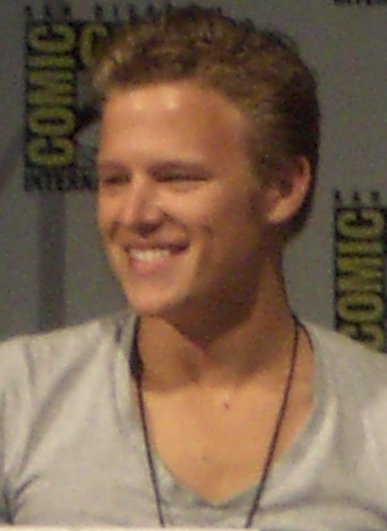
- Egan in 2008
- Born: Christopher Andrew Egan; 29 June 1984 (age 42); Sydney, New South Wales, Australia
- Occupation: Actor
- Years active: 2000–present
- Notable work: Home and Away (2000–2003)

Christopher Andrew Egan (born 29 June 1984) is an Australian actor. He played Nick Smith in the Australian soap opera Home and Away from 2000 to 2003, and David Shepherd on the NBC television drama Kings. He also portrayed Alex Lannon in the apocalyptic TV series Dominion.

== Life and career ==
Egan appeared in several commercials and did some modelling, before he performed in the Glen Street productions of Les Misérables and West Side Story. From 2000 until 2003, Egan played Nick Smith in the television soap opera Home and Away. He then went on to appear in the 2005 miniseries Empire as Marcus Agrippa. Egan lived in Rome while filming for the series and learned basic Italian.

He has also been trained in gymnastics, singing, dancing and acting at the KICK Performance Group (now The School @ AIPA) in Sydney. As well as competing in several eisteddfods at an early age, Egan has been able to use his gymnastics skills extensively in the thriller film Crush.

He moved to Los Angeles in 2003. In 2006, he appeared in the film adaptation of Christopher Paolini's novel Eragon. In 2007, he played a small role in Resident Evil: Extinction, the third movie in the Resident Evil series. In the summer of 2009, he shot the movie Letters to Juliet in Italy, with Amanda Seyfried, Vanessa Redgrave and Gael García Bernal.

Egan starred in Dominion, a Sci Fi supernatural action drama based on characters from the 2010 feature film Legion that starred Paul Bettany. Egan played Alex Lannon, a rebellious young soldier who discovers he is the unlikely savior of humanity.

== Filmography ==
=== Film ===
Year	Title	Role	Notes
2006	Eragon	Roran	Debut film
2007	Virgin Territory	Dioneo	
2007	Resident Evil: Extinction	Mikey	
2009	Crush	Julian	
2010	Letters to Juliet	Charlie Wyman	
2019	Cult	Doug	Short
TBA	Beyond the Rush	Peter Grievess	Post-production
TBA	Rest and Relaxation	TBA	Post-production

=== Television ===
Year	Title	Role	Notes
2000–2003	Home and Away	Nick Smith	82 episodes
2002	Home and Away: Secrets and the City	Nick Smith	Direct-to-video special
2005	Empire	Agrippa	Miniseries, 3 episodes
2006	Everwood	Nick Bennett	2 episodes
2006	Alpha Male	Felix Methusulah	TV film
2006	Vanished	Ben Wilson	12 episodes
2008	Pretty/Handsome	Beckett	TV film
2009	Kings	David Shepherd	13 episodes
2011	Poe	Edgar Allan Poe	TV pilot
2013	Gothica	Dorian Grey	TV film
2014–2015	Dominion	Alex Lannon	Main cast
2015	The Prince	Zach	TV film
2026	The Rookie	Douglas Roberts	1 episode
