= Kimberley Cooper =

Australian television actress (born 1980)

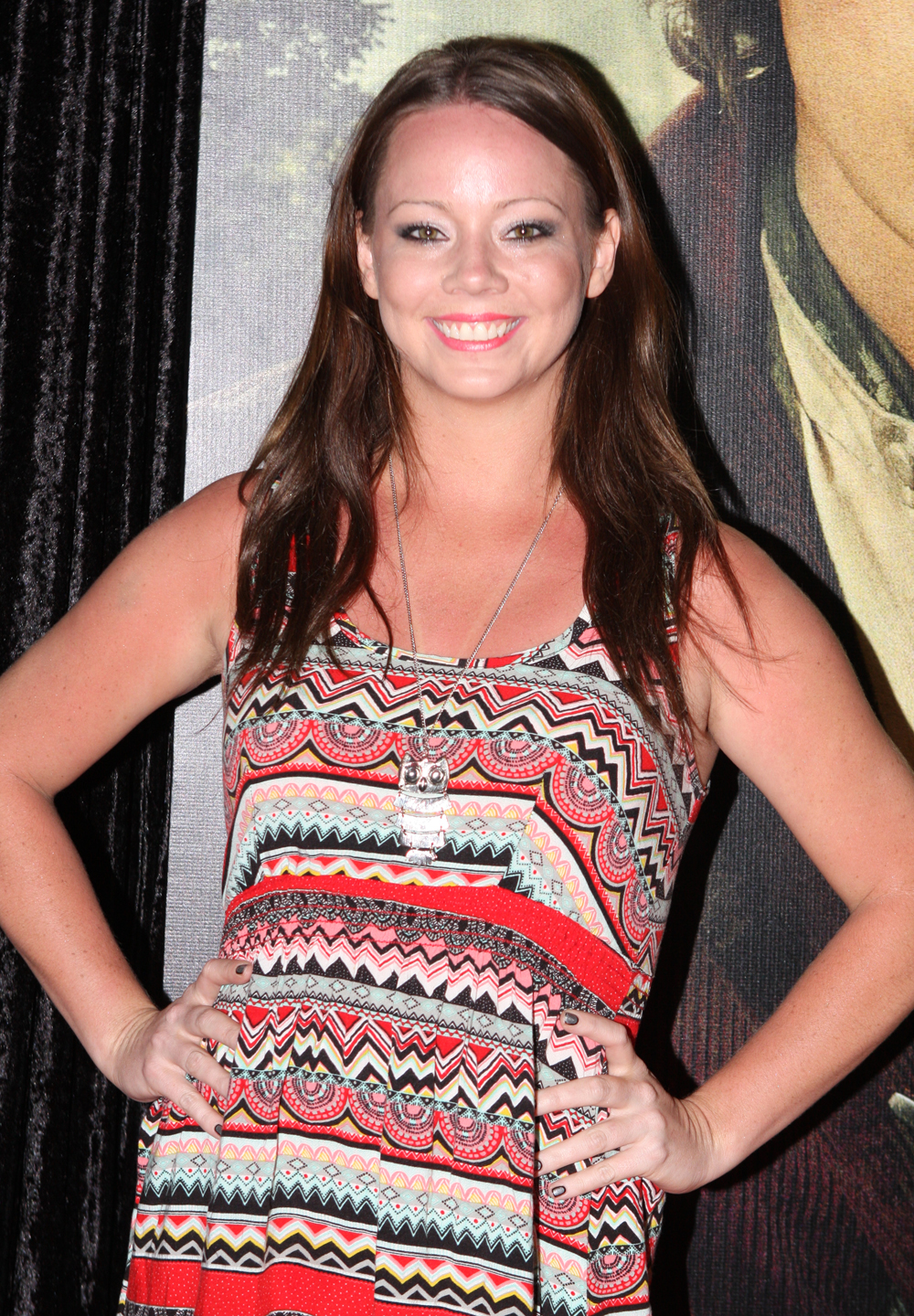
- Born: Kimberley Cooper; 24 April 1980 (age 45); Sydney, New South Wales, Australia
- Occupation: Actress
- Years active: 1998–present
- Spouses: Nick Sacco (2010–2013); Bryan Crocker (m. 2024)

Kimberley Cooper (born 24 April 1980) is an Australian television actress known for her character of Gypsy Nash on the Australian soap opera Home and Away.

== Early life ==
Kimberley Cooper was born on 24 April 1980 in Sydney, New South Wales, Australia.

== Career ==
Cooper starred in the Australian soap opera Home and Away, from 1998 until 2002, then a small stint in 2011. She played the character of Gypsy Nash in the show. Cooper won the Logie Award for Most Popular New Talent on Australian television in 1999 and the Best Aussie Actress for The Inside Soap Awards, UK, 2000.

In 2002, she was a contestant on Australia's Celebrity Big Brother.

Kimberley left Home and Away before her contract expired. In 2006, she resurfaced in New York City, performing in an Australian production of The Boys to American audiences. She returned to Home and Away on 9 September 2011 and departed again on 13 October 2011.
