= List of Home and Away characters introduced in 2001 =

Home and Away is an Australian soap opera first broadcast on the Seven Network on 17 January 1988. The following is a list of characters that first appeared in 2001, by order of first appearance. They were all introduced by the show's then executive producer John Holmes. The 14th season of Home and Away began airing on 15 January 2001. The first introduction of the year was Alex Poulos in February. Sam Atwell joined the cast as Kane Phillips on 9 April, Kane's brother Scott debuted in the following episode. June saw the respective arrivals of Seb Miller and Flynn Saunders. Stephanie Chaves-Jacobsen began playing doctor Charlotte Adams in September, while Jim Tyler appeared at the end of the month. November saw Daniel Collopy join the cast as Josh West and two births occurred; VJ Patterson and Lily Smith.

== Alex Poulos ==
Alexi "Alex" Poulos', portrayed by Danny Raco, made his first on screen appearance on 26 February 2001 and departed in 2004. Raco returned for a brief guest stint in 2007 and made his final appearance on 19 June 2007. Raco joined the cast in 2001 and his first scenes began airing on 26 February 2001. He quit the serial in late 2003 to pursue a career in directing and his final scenes aired in early 2004. For his portrayal of Alex, Raco was nominated for Most Popular New Male Talent at the 2002 Logie Awards.

== Scott Phillips ==
Scott Phillips
- Home and Away character
- Portrayed by: Nathaniel Dean (2001); Josh Rosenthal (2003, 2005)
- Duration: 2001, 2003, 2005
- First appearance: 10 April 2001
- Last appearance: 23 February 2005
- Introduced by: Julie McGuaran
In-universe information
- Father: Gus Phillips
- Brothers: Kane Phillips
- Nephews: Oliver Phillips

Scott Phillips, played by Nathaniel Dean, made his first appearance on-screen during the episode airing on 10 April 2001. When the character returned in 2003, Josh Rosenthal took over the role and Scott made his final appearance on 23 February 2005.

Scott is Kane Phillips' (Sam Atwell) older brother. He begins menacing Nick Smith (Chris Egan) when he damages his motorbike and demands $200. When Jude Lawson (Ben Steel) is accused of beating Kane up for harassing his girlfriend Shauna Bradley (Kylie Watson), Scott attacks him. Scott and Kane then kidnap Shauna and a police siege ensues and Shauna is freed and Scott is jailed.

Two years later, Scott is released and returns to Summer Bay. It emerges that he and Kane were involved in a service station robbery and held Tasha Andrews (Isabel Lucas) hostage. When Scott comes to reclaim the money, Kane tells him it burned up in the Drop-in centre fire but he refuses to believe him and threatens to harm Tasha. Scott then attempts to kidnap Tasha but is quickly foiled. He then holds Flynn Saunders (Joel McIlroy) at gunpoint in his surgery but Flynn overpowers him. Scott then trashes the old Hunter farm and flees the Bay.

Scott reappears in February 2005 when Kane visits him in prison after learning their father Gus (Peter Lamb) visited Scott, revealing details of the robbery he framed Kane for. Scott refuses to tell him anything at first but agrees as long as Kane's lawyer Morag Bellingham (Cornelia Frances) helps him with his own upcoming appeal. Kane stands trial and Scott is called as a witness but immediately lies on the stand, claiming Kane asked him to lie under oath, destroying Kane's defence.

== Flynn Saunders ==
Flynn Saunders, played by Martin Dingle-Wall, made his first appearance on 13 July 2001. Dingle-Wall quit the serial in 2002 and was subsequently replaced by Joel McIlroy in 2003. The character departed following his death on 13 February 2006. The episode featuring Flynn's death won writer, Sam Miekle, the Australian Writers' Guild Award for "Best Episode in a Television Serial" in 2006. For their portrayals of Flynn, Dingle-Wall and McIlroy were nominated for "Most Popular New Male Talent" and "Most Popular Actor" at the 2002 and 2006 Logie Award ceremonies, respectively. Flynn's death was voted the second most gripping storyline in a TV Week reader's poll in December 2006. McIlroy's portrayal of Flynn earned him three nominations at the 2006 Inside Soap Awards in the respective categories of "Best Actor", "Best Couple" alongside Co-star Ritchie, and "Best Storyline" for Flynn's death.

== Charlotte Adams ==
Charlotte Adams, played by Stephanie Chaves-Jacobsen, made her first appearance on 10 September 2001. The character was billed as "pretty, smart, generous and sincere". Charlotte enrolled in medical school to become a doctor, and while she is "fairly bright", she struggles with her degree. Producers wrote the character out in 2002.

== Jim Tyler ==
Jim Tyler
- Home and Away character
- Portrayed by: Shane Porteous
- First appearance: 25 September 2001
- Last appearance: 2 November 2001
- Introduced by: Julie McGuaran
In-universe information
- Sons: Dean

Jim Tyler, played by Shane Porteous, made his first appearance on 25 September 2001. During a storyline conference, Porteous, who had since become a script writer for Home and Away, mentioned that he liked the character and thought he was interesting. He told Louise Napier of the Herald Sun that the role had yet to be cast at that point, so he agreed to play Jim. Porteous admitted to feeling nervous on his first day on set and questioned if he remembered how to act, saying "But once I got there and realised the show used a lot of the same studios and much of the same crew as A Country Practice, I was immediately at ease." Napier described Jim as "a drifter with a mysterious past" and said he had "raised eyebrows in Summer Bay" since his debut. Jackie Brygel from the same publication criticised why every new character in the Bay had to be hiding a secret, writing "This week, it's Jim who decides to reveal his – yep, you guessed it – hidden and oh-so-mysterious past.

Jim is found sleeping on the beach by Brodie Hanson (Susie Rugg) and Dani Sutherland) (Tammin Sursok). He later comes to Brodie's rescue when she is attacked by a dog at the caravan park. Dani's father Rhys (Michael Beckley) invites Jim around for dinner in gratitude and offers him accommodation in a spare van in exchange for some odd jobs. Jim falls sick and upon his release from hospital, principal Donald Fisher (Norman Coburn) recognises him as a qualified professor and asks him to cover some classes for a short while. Jim's methods prove outdated and after being taunted by Nick Smith (Chris Egan), he suffers a nervous breakdown and is transferred to a city hospital. It later emerges that Jim accidentally ran over his toddler son, Dean, fifteen years ago.

== Josh West ==
Josh West, played by Daniel Collopy, debuted on-screen during late 2001 and departed in 2003. He returned in late 2005 where Josh tried to develop a freeway through town and subsequently became mayor of Summer Bay. He was later accidentally killed in early 2006. In September 2001, Collopy successfully auditioned for the role of Josh and moved from Melbourne to Sydney to begin filming. Josh was Collopy's first regular television role and he felt it was a "fantastic opportunity" to work on Home and Away. Network Seven describe Josh as being part of a "high-society family" and initially being "about as laid-back as they come". Collopy was written out of the serial when Josh is murdered in a whodunit storyline. The serial's producers wanted to capitalise on the success of their stalker storyline, which pulled in high viewing figures, by creating a new mystery plot. For his portrayal of Josh, Collopy was nominated for the "Most Popular New Male Talent" Logie Award in 2003. Collopy was nominated for "Best Bad Boy" at the 2006 Inside Soap Awards. Michael Idato of the said that Josh was the "new hottie" in Summer Bay and credited Josh's on-screen romance as transforming Collopy into the "No 1. TV Week coverboy".

== VJ Patterson ==
Vincent "VJ" Patterson, Jr., played by Felix Dean, made his first screen appearance during the episode broadcast on 30 November 2001. From his introduction, VJ has been played by eleven different child actors. These include Carlo Teodorowych, Jack Monger, Max Theoharis, Marcus Spinetti, Jack Riddle, Harry Roberts, James Roberts, Nicholas Stevens, Cameron Stevens and Cooper Scott. Felix Dean was cast in the role in 2007. For his portrayal of VJ, Dean has been nominated for Best Young Actor at the 2008 and 2009 Inside Soap Awards. VJ's name has been a source of amusement to some critics, with one calling him "unfortunately named" and another believing that he was named after an "early model Holden".

== Lily Smith ==
Lily Smith
- Home and Away character
- Portrayed by: Harriet Tapley and Simone Medici (2001–2002); Carlo Teodorowych (2001); Marcus Spinetti (2001); Geoffrey Fois (2001); Tahlia Thorpe (2001); Ciara Sowden; Jasmine Sowden (2002); Claudia and Olivia Jenkins (2003); Charlie Rose MacLennan (2010–2011)
- Duration: 2001–2003, 2010–2011
- First appearance: 30 November 2001
- Last appearance: 13 October 2011
- Introduced by: Julie McGuaran; Cameron Welsh (2010)
In-universe information
- Other names: Lily Nash
- Occupation: Student
- Father: Will Smith
- Mother: Gypsy Nash
- Sisters: Rachel McGregor (adoptive)
- Grandfathers: Ken Smith; Joel Nash
- Grandmothers: Eve Smith; Natalie Nash
- Uncles: Nick Smith; Tom Nash; Connor Nash
- Aunts: Hayley Smith
- First cousins: Noah Smith
- Other relatives: Travis Nash

Lily Smith (also Nash) made her first appearance on 30 November 2001, following her birth. Eight babies initially alternated between playing Lily and VJ Patterson, another child that was born in the same episode. Due to strict regulations around newborn babies on set, the serial employed four times as many babies as they needed. The babies were often swapped out after working a certain number of hours or spending a certain time under the studio lights. The babies playing Lily and VJ were Harriet Tapley, Simone Medici, Carlo Teodorowych Jack Monger, Marcus Spinetti, Geoffrey Fois, Tahlia Thorpe, and Max Theoharis. Twins Claudia and Olivia Jenkins assumed the role of Lily for one episode in 2003 and when the character returned to the serial in 2010, she was portrayed by Charlie Rose MacLennan. MacLennan began appearing as Lily from 14 October. She commented that she was initially starstruck when she first arrived on the set, saying "I knew everyone's face and I expected them to be exactly like their characters, but they're definitely not."

Lily is born to Gypsy Nash (Kimberley Cooper) and Will Smith (Zac Drayson) when their car breaks on a roadside down en route to Northern Districts Hospital and Will delivers Lily. Will and Gypsy marry in a ceremony on the beach before they leave Summer Bay for Queensland. Lily is seen again when her uncle Nick (Chris Egan) visits Will in Queensland after being accused of assaulting Angie Russell (Laurie Foell). Lily gains a sister when her parents adopt Rachel McGregor (Sara Mumcu) who has been living with them for a while.

Lily returns with Will to visit Irene Roberts (Lynne McGranger) and she is happy to see them. Will reveals the reason for this visit; his marriage to Gypsy has broken down following his infidelity with another woman. When Will's reconciliation with Gypsy fails, he trashes the Beach House, to Lily's fright. Lily meets VJ Patterson (Felix Dean), who was born on the same day as her and they make a plan to run away to see Elijah Johnson (Jay Laga'aia) in Africa. Along the way to the airport they are picked up by hitch-hiker Gary (Keith Agus) who gives them a lift but they get frightened when he suggests they go to his house first and run away. VJ and Lily are found by detectives Robert Robertson (Socrattis Otto) and Detective Graves (Eryn-Jean Norvill) and return to their respective parents Leah Patterson-Baker (Ada Nicodemou) and Will. Lily falls ill and Will takes her away from the bay but Irene encourages him to bring her back. Lily falls sicker and Will tells Irene to look after her but is arrested before he can get away. When Will is revealed as Penn Graham's (Christian Clark) killer, he is remanded in custody and Lily is returned to Gypsy.

Lily and Gypsy return several months later to visit Irene following her cancer diagnosis and help look after her. Gypsy's new boyfriend Mark Gilmour (Shane Emmett) arrives and it is clear that he and Lily do not get on very well. Mark later suggests sending Lily to boarding school, but Gypsy disagrees with the idea. Gypsy and Mark's relationship ends after Lily learns Gypsy had sex with Liam Murphy (Axel Whitehead) and tells Mark. Irene tells Gypsy to leave and she and Lily return to Queensland.

== Others ==
Date(s)	Character	Actor	Circumstances
15 January	Reverend Wardosrski	Dean Nottie	Wardorski presides over the funeral of Ailsa Stewart (Judy Nunn).
25 January–17 July 2002	Stella Patterson	Tina Bursill	Stella is Vinnie Patterson's (Ryan Kwanten) mother who arrives ahead of Vinnie's wedding to Leah Poulos (Ada Nicodemou). She mistakes Leah for Vinnie's cleaning lady upon first meeting her and later clashes with Leah's father Theo (Silvio Ofria) over plans for the ceremony. Stella and Theo 's interference is enough to prompt Vinnie to think twice about the wedding but he and Leah decide to persevere and Stella and Theo back off. Stella attends the wedding and shares a kiss with Alf Stewart (Ray Meagher) at the reception much to the chagrin of his son Duncan (Brendan McKensy). Stella also attends her grandson VJ's christening and frequently babysits him.
1–7 February	Desiree Upton	Simone Robertson	Desiree is a friend of Gypsy Nash (Kimberley Cooper) from TAFE. She is attracted to Gypsy and kisses her while in the kitchen at the Drop-in centre, which Dani Sutherland (Tammin Sursok) witnesses. News of the kiss spreads and Desiree realises Gypsy is using her to prove a point to Shelley Sutherland (Paula Forrest) and confronts her over it.
1–21 February	Hamish "Woody" Woodford	Chris Foy	Woody enrols at Summer Bay High after being expelled from Yabbie Creek. Brodie Hanson (Susie Rugg) befriends him after other students either avoid or make fun of him. Mitch McColl (Cameron Welsh) is annoyed with the amount of time Brodie is spending with Woody. Woody mistakes Brodie's friendship for something more and tries kiss her, scaring her off. Brodie tries to make between Woody and Mitch ahead of the school talent show but their collaboration fails after both boys have different ideas. After Woody's poem "Black Dogs" does not go down well at the talent show, he begins writing the names of all of those he has a grudge against in a book. Ahead of class, he hands Mitch a bullet telling him he is lucky to be late for class. Woody then takes Brodie, Sally Fletcher (Kate Ritchie), Dani Sutherland (Tammin Sursok) and an entire class hostage with a gun and a siege ensues. The police are called in and Woody's father Ian is asked to talk to him but he berates him for his behaviour. Woody becomes more agitated when one of his frightened captives will not stop crying. Sally tries to tackle him for the gun and discovers it is a fake. Woody is then subdued and arrested.
12–21 February	Ian Woodford	Wayne Pygram	Ian is the father of Hamish "Woody" Woodford (Chris Foy). He refuses to see that his son needs psychiatric help. When Woody begins a siege at Summer Bay High, the police ask Ian if he can reason with him but he berates him for his actions. Ian then orders Shelley Sutherland (Paula Forrest) to leave when she visits his wife Louise (Mary Allen), who suffers from the same psychological problems as Woody.
15–16 February	Morrie Sanders	Peter Brownie	Morrie is Mitch McColl's (Cameron Welsh) uncle. He tracks him down via a Private Investigator and reveals his identity. He tells Mitch that his Grandmother is dying in New Zealand and he stands to inherit some money. After mulling it over, Mitch joins Morrie in New Zealand permanently.
26 February–8 March	Holly Loader	Clare Flanaghan	Holly is Jude Lawson's (Ben Steel) ex-girlfriend. She arrives to cause havoc in his life by telling Jude that his brother Noah (Beau Brady) tried to seduce her when they were still together resulting in Jude throwing Noah out. Further problems are caused when Chris Poulos (Alex Blias) invites Holly to his sister Leah's wedding reception, sparking ire from Jude. Holly clashes with Noah's girlfriend, Hayley Smith (Bec Cartwright).
6 March–26 February 2009	Helen Poulos	Peta Toppano; Anna-Maria Monticelli	Helen is the mother of Leah Poulos (Ada Nicodemou) and her brothers, Dimitri (Salvatore Coco), Chris (Alex Blias) and Alex (Danny Raco). She and her husband Theo (Silvio Ofria) arrive in Summer Bay ahead of Leah's wedding to Vinnie Patterson (Ryan Kwanten).
6–7 March	Christina Poulos	Barbara Gouskos	Christina, her father Con (Nicholas Papademetriou) and her son Petro (Erieta Tseztsimis; Andriano Cassinat) arrive in Summer Bay ahead of Leah Poulos's (Ada Nicodemou) wedding to Vinnie Patterson (Ryan Kwanten).
6–7 March	Petro Poulos	Erieta Tseztsimis; Andriano Cassinati	Christina, her father Con (Nicholas Papademetriou) and her son Petro (Erieta Tseztsimis; Andriano Cassinat) arrive in Summer Bay ahead of Leah Poulos's (Ada Nicodemou) wedding to Vinnie Patterson (Ryan Kwanten).
6–8 March	Con Poulos	Nicholas Papademetriou	Con is the brother of Theo Poulos (Silvio Ofria) and Uncle to Leah (Ada Nicodemou), Dimitri (Salvatore Coco), Chris (Alex Blias) and Alex Poulos (Danny Raco). He visits the bay for Leah's wedding to Vinnie Patterson (Ryan Kwanten). At the reception, he argues with Alex and Theo over Alex's employment and Theo's business practices.
7 March	Effie	Melina Clark	Effie is the sister of Christina Poulos (Barbara Gouskous)
12 March–12 April	Geoff Webb	John Sheerin	Geoff is Shelley Sutherland's (Paula Forrest) father. He arrives to stay with the Sutherlands and brings his girlfriend, Linda (Cathy Campbell) with him. Shelley takes a dislike to Linda and argues with Geoff about leaving her mother Avril (Suzanne Dudley) for Linda. Geoff decides to leave and when a storm approaches and his boat is missing from the wharf, the family fear the worst but he returns safe and well. Geoff and Avril mend their differences and then leave the Bay.
12–23 March	Linda	Cathy Campbell	Linda is Geoff Webb's (John Sheerin) girlfriend. She arrives to with him to stay with his daughter Shelley Sutherland (Paula Forrest) but feels unwelcome and leaves. Linda then returns to break up with Geoff after she does not share his vision of settling in the Bay.
14 March–3 April	Toni Davidson	Rowan Witt	Toni hides out in Hayley Smith's (Bec Cartwright) car and runs away when she and Noah Lawson (Beau Brady) discover her. Tom Nash (Graeme Squires) finds Toni in a caravan and tries to catch her but she hits him with crate a and runs away. Toni then arrives at the Drop-in centre and Shelley Sutherland attends to her. After initially thinking Toni is a boy due to her appearance, Noah discovers she is a girl. Toni's father John comes looking for her and tries to take her back home but he is foiled by her grandfather, Leo (Bill Charlton) and Rhys Sutherland (Michael Beckley). John is arrested and Toni later reveals to Shelley that John abused her.
14 March–2 April	Leo Davidson	Bill Charlton	Leo is Toni Davidson's (Rowan Witt) grandfather. He is seen chasing Toni, and warns Noah Lawson (Beau Brady) and Hayley Smith off his land. Leo turns nasty when Shelley Sutherland (Paula Forrest) investigates the reason why Toni is so scared of Leo. He and Toni reconcile. When Leo's son John (Sean Dennehy) snatches Toni, Leo chases after them and a scuffle ensues. Rhys Sutherland is able to subdue John and he is arrested. Leo and Toni then return home.
14 March–10 April	Andrew Moffatt	Anthony Burke	Andrew is Gypsy Nash's (Kimberley Cooper) lecturer from TAFE. He threatens to sue her when Gypsy alleges that he is the father of her unborn baby.
29 March–20 April	Melissa Hill	Bianca Sulkowicz	Melissa is a friend of Jade Sutherland's (Kate Garven) from Ballet Class.
29 March	Tonya	Sharni Vinson	Tonya attends the same Ballet class in the city as Jade Sutherland and Melissa Hill and picks on Jade for being out of practice.
30 March–2 April	John Davidson	Sean Dennehy	John is Toni Davidson's (Rowan Witt) father. He tries to drag her back home but his father Leo (Bill Charlton) and Rhys Sutherland (Michael Beckley) foil him. Toni then reveals to the police that John has been abusing her.
11–12 April	Avril Webb	Suzanne Dudley	Avril is the mother of Shelley Sutherland (Paula Forrest). She arrives in Summer Bay in order to reconcile her marriage to Geoff (John Sheerin).
11–27 April	Skye Patterson	Angela Keep	Skye is Vinnie Patterson's (Ryan Kwanten) cousin. She arrives to stay with Vinnie and his wife Leah (Ada Nicodemou). Skye attracts the attentions of Leah's brother Alex Poulos (Danny Raco) and when he asks her out, she stands him up. Skye then kisses Noah Lawson (Beau Brady) at his girlfriend Hayley Smith's (Bec Cartwright) 18th birthday party. Vinnie's patience with Skye begins to run out and she decides to leave but not before a shopping trip with Leah.
10–24 May	Jill Lawson	Tracy Mann	Jill is the mother of Jude (Ben Steel) and Noah Lawson (Beau Brady). She reappears in her son's life after years of estrangement due to her religious extremism. Noah is not pleased to see her and Hayley Smith tries to mend things but ultimately makes them worse. Jill also clashes with Jude and meddles in his relationship with Shauna Bradley (Kylie Watson) and prompts more worry when Hayley is drawn to her. Noah and Jude visit Reverend Bailey (William Usic) who tells them their mother needs psychiatric help and the three of them try to convince Jill to get help. At first Jill is reluctant but she realises in order to have any relationship with her sons, she needs help and accepts.
22 May–1 June	Patrick Curl	Kip Gamblin	Patrick attends Yabbie Creek TAFE with Gypsy Nash (Kimberley Cooper). He asks Gypsy out on a date and when she tells him she is pregnant, he tells her he will be there for both her and the baby. They go on the date but Gypsy is distracted and she explains that Will Smith (Zac Drayson) is in a relationship with someone else and that she would reunite with him if the relationship broke up. Patrick understands and he and Gypsy part on good terms.
22 May–12 June	David Barclay	Jimmy Sergeant	David is a new student at Summer Bay High who Jade Sutherland (Kate Garven) befriends. Jade's boyfriend, Duncan Stewart (Brendan McKensy) takes a dislike to David when he discovers David's, Richard (Terence Crawford) developments caused the mudslide the previous year that cost Duncan and his family their home, as well as many other residents. Jade assures David is not his fault but he receives harassment from other students over it. Following Jade and Duncan's break-up, Jade begins spending more time with David, angering Duncan. Duncan attempts attack David with a bomb, but it backfires and injures him instead. Richard then sends David back to his school in the city and they leave.
7–11 June	Richard Barclay	Terence Crawford	Richard is David Barclay's (Jimmy Sergeant) father. He finds an injured Duncan Stewart (Brendan McKensy) outside his house after a mailbomb prank on David backfires. Richard then sends David back to his boarding school in the city.
21 June–6 July	Anna Miller	Elizabeth Maywald	Anna is Seb Miller's (Mitch Firth) mother. They arrive in Summer Bay looking for work. Jude Lawson Ben Steel) hires Anna to work for him, cleaning at Summer Bay High. Anna and Seb begin squatting in an abandoned van at the Caravan Park and are quickly discovered by Kirsty Sutherland. Kirsty agrees to hide them but her father Rhys (Michael Beckley) catches and chases them off. Anna later collapses at work and is rushed to hospital. It is revealed she is dying of cancer. Anna's condition deteriorates and before she dies, she reveals to Seb that his father is Alan Fisher (Simon Bossell), the late son of Donald Fisher (Norman Coburn).
23 July–16 August	Aidan Bradley	Ben Mortley	Aidan is Shauna Bradley's (Kylie Watson) adoptive Brother. He begins dating Hayley Smith (Bec Hewitt) following her break-up with Noah Lawson (Beau Brady). Aidan begins to exhibit a degree of control of Hayley by getting her to dress in clothes he wants her to wear and having him do what he wants her to do. Noah and Irene Roberts (Lynne McGranger) warn Hayley but she will not listen until Gypsy Nash (Kimberley Cooper) shows how much of a control freak Aidan is. Hayley then gets her own back by humiliating Aidan at a corporate lunch by making modifications to a dress Aidan wanted to her to wear.
24 July–23 October 2002	Julius Peters	Leslie Brock	Julius is a classmate of Nick Smith (Chris Egan), Seb Miller (Mitch Firth), Jade (Kate Garven) and Kirsty Sutherland (Christie Hayes). Jade and Julius go on a date but she is clearly uninterested in him. Julius is also involved during a bus crash on a Year 10 field trip the following year. Several months later, Julius auditions for a lead in the Rock Eisteddfod but is unsuccessful and is given a background role.
3 August–10 July 2003	Simone Harris	Chelsea Yates	Simone briefly dates Nick Smith (Chris Egan), much to the chagrin of Jade Sutherland (Kate Garven) who recently rejected Nick. Simone's relationship with Nick comes to an end after she insults Jade. She later bids on Seb Miller (Mitch Firth) at the slave auction, to the annoyance of Jade's sister, Kirsty (Christie Hayes). Simone and Jade become friends but the friendship breaks down when Jade and Nick get together and Simone feels like she was used in order to aid the relationship. Simone appears sparingly throughout the next year and a half including auditioning for a part in the Rock Eisteddfod; accusing Nick of attacking Angie Russell (Laurie Foell) and appearing at Donald Fisher's (Norman Coburn) farewell.
13 August–27 September	Matt Lowe	Steve Matthews	Lowe is an inspector from the local Council who discovers electrical faults and White Ants at the Sarah McKay Drop-in centre. He later assures Shelley Sutherland (Paula Forrest) that the centre will stay open for the foreseeable future.
30 August–4 September	Robbie Jamieson	Rupert Evans	Robbie is a concierge at a hotel in London when the Irene Roberts (Lynne McGranger), Donald Fisher (Norman Coburn) and the Smith siblings visit for Donald's book launch. Robbie shows an interest in Hayley Smith (Bec Hewitt) and shows her around the city. Robbie falls for Hayley but she ends the relationship by saying things would not work long distance.
31 August-3 September	James Cooper	Rod Hallett	James is Public Relations representative for the UK publishing house responsible for Donald Fisher's (Norman Coburn) book letter to Byron.
4–5 September	Heidi McIntyre	Aimee Moffatt	Heidi is a music reviewer from the city who comes to see a performance from the band containing Flynn Saunders (Martin Dingle-Wall), Sally Fletcher (Kate Ritchie), Jude Ben Steel) and Noah Lawson (Beau Brady). Heidi has a short-lived fling with Alex Poulos (Danny Raco) much to the dismay of Alex's ex-girlfriend (Brodie Hanson).
7 September	Gary	Ian Hodson	Gary is Jan Hanson's (Genevieve Sulway) ex-boyfriend. He arrives when Jan and her daughter Brodie (Susie Rugg) are having lunch and asks Jan to give their relationship another try and she agrees. Brodie asks Jan why is she taking Gary back and Jan blames her for their break-up and then leaves with Gary.
12 September–23 November	Miles Alcott	Steven Rooke	Miles is a friend of Alex Poulos (Danny Raco) who arrives to stay with him. Miles meets Brodie Hanson (Susie Rugg) on the beach and agree to have a date. Alex, who has recently broken up with Brodie, witnesses the date and Brodie leaves. However, Alex assures Miles he is fine with him dating Brodie even though it is clear he is not. Miles and Alex fall out but reconcile before Miles leaves to study in Italy. Several months later, Miles returns the Bay for the school formal and brings Brodie a necklace as a present. They dress up as Marc Anthony and Cleopatra. On the way home from the formal, Alex, who is driving, hits a pothole and the car veers off the road and hits a tree. Alf Stewart (Ray Meagher) finds them and goes for help. Charlotte Adams (Stephanie Chaves-Jacobsen) tries her best to resuscitate Miles, but he dies at the scene. Miles appears to Brodie in her dreams telling her to let go of him. A bench is erected in Miles' memory at the headland and Alex is found not guilty at the inquest.
17 September–6 August 2002	Dr. Carlingford	Alan Faulkner	Carlingford is a senior doctor at Northern Districts Hospital who is Charlotte Adams' (Stephanie Chaves-Jacobsen superior. He frequently scolds her over her work and clashes with her over hospital matters. Carlingford attends to Kane Phillips (Sam Atwell), Shelley (Paula Forrest) and Kirsty Sutherland (Christie Hayes) following the Mirgini disaster and later advises Charlotte against taking maternity leave as it may harm her career. He is left stunned when Charlotte tenders her resignation.
25 September–9 May 2003	Gladys Adams	Moya O'Sullivan	Gladys is Charlotte Adams' (Stephanie Chaves-Jacobsen) grandmother who lives with her. She wanders downstairs into Jude Lawson and Noah Lawson's (Beau Brady) flat, thinking it is hers. After Gladys nearly burns down their flat, Charlotte suggests that she moves into a retirement home. Gladys is next seen when Nick Smith) (Chris Egan) begins working at the home after being sentenced to community service. Gladys complains of abuse from a staff member, which is ignored, but Nick and Seb Miller (Mitch Firth) do some investigating and uncover the nurse who is abusing Gladys.
1–17 October	Steve Kent	Don Hany	Steve is the boyfriend of Charlotte Adams (Stephanie Chaves-Jacobsen). Their relationship is an uneasy one as Steve hits Charlotte. She forgives him however and they resume things much to the horror of Jude Lawson Ben Steel). After Steve has another violent outburst at Charlotte, she finishes with him and leaves.
9 October–14 February 2006	Ashley Saunders	Zoe Ella	Ashley is the younger sister of Flynn Saunders (Martin Dingle-Wall). Following the death of her and Flynn's mother, Ashley runs away and begins taking heroin. Flynn finds her in a Squat after several false leads and brings her back to Summer Bay. Flynn tries to rehabilitate Ashley himself but it proves challenging but there is a small breakthrough. However, Ashley's habit gets the better of her and she breaks into Colleen Smart's (Lyn Collingwood) mobile home and steals some money to get her fix from a local dealer. Terry, Ashley's previous dealer comes looking for her and she tries to get away from him. After seeing the extent of Ashley's problems, Dani Sutherland (Tammin Sursok) organises a drug-free event featuring some Wallabies players. Ashley improves and later returns home to her father John (Bill Charlton). Ashley and John return several years later for Flynn's funeral following his death of cancer.
9–25 October	Terry	Keiran Darcy-Smith	Terry is Ashley Saunders' (Zoe Ella) pimp and drug dealer. When Ashley's brother Flynn (Martin Dingle-Wall) comes looking for her, Terry threatens him away. When Terry chases Ashley into the drop-in centre, he shoves Sally Fletcher (Kate Ritchie), injuring her in the process.
17 October–11 March 2003	Maggie Smart	Elizabeth & Jamie Chambers; Alyssa & Brianna Dwight	Maggie is the daughter of Lance (Peter Vroom) and Debbie Smart (Kelly Butler). Lance brings Maggie to visit her grandmother Colleen (Lyn Collingwood) when he and Debbie have marital problems. Maggie is next seen when Lance and Debbie return for Colleen's book launch.
9 November–14 February 2006	John Saunders	Bill Charlton	John is the father of Flynn Saunders (Martin Dingle-Wall). He arrives in Summer Bay to check up on Flynn's sister, Ashley (Zoe Ella) and convinces her to return to the city with him. John later attends Flynn's wedding to Sally Fletcher (Kate Ritchie) in 2003 and Flynn's funeral in 2006.
19–26 November	Inspector Fraser	Angelean Milner	Fraser interviews Alex Poulos (Danny Raco) following a car crash that leaves Miles Alcott (Steven Rooke) dead. A week later, she takes a statement from Brodie Hanson (Susie Rugg), who was in the car with Alex and Miles.
20 November–16 May 2002	Lara Rogers	Charde Doherty	Lara is a student at Summer Bay High. Sally Fletcher (Kate Ritchie) notice Lara is becoming visibly tired in class, falling behind with her work and looking rough. When Seb Miller (Mitch Firth) finds Lara asking other students for sandwiches he realises there is something wrong. Flynn Saunders (Martin Dingle-Wall) finds Lara eating someone's leftovers at the diner and tries to help but Lara rejects his help. Flynn and Sally discover Lara's home life is chaotic and after a visit, she threatens to call the police but later apologises. After speaking with Lara's mother, Lindy (Gabrielle Adkins), Sally offers to help tutor her. The following year, Lara and Seb begin dating but it does not last very long before Seb's feelings for his ex-girlfriend, Kirsty Sutherland (Christie Hayes) resurface and Lara dumps him.
21–23 November	Billy	Leon Stripp	Billy is a friend of Josh West (Daniel Collopy) who arrives in town for Schoolies.
27 November	Kelly Rogers	Bronte Doherty	Kelly is the younger sister of Lara Rogers (Charde Doherty). When Sally Fletcher (Kate Ritchie) and Flynn Saunders (Martin Dingle-Wall) visit Lara at home, she tells them that she does not speak to strangers.
28 November	Lindy Rogers	Gabrielle Adkins	Lindy is the mother of Lara (Charde Doherty) and Kelly (Bronte Doherty).
