= Charlotte Adams (Home and Away) =

- Home and Away character
- Portrayed by: Stephanie Chaves-Jacobsen
- Duration: 2001–2002
- First appearance: 10 September 2001
- Last appearance: 3 September 2002
- Introduced by: Julie McGuaran
In-universe information
- Occupation: Doctor
- Mother: Karen Adams
- Grandmothers: Gladys Adams

Charlotte Adams is a fictional character from the Australian television soap opera Home and Away, portrayed by actress Stephanie Chaves-Jacobsen. She first appeared during the episode that aired on 10 September 2001 and departed following her on-screen death on 3 September 2002.

== Development ==
Securing the role of Charlotte was unexpected for Chaves-Jacobsen, as she had only been acting for eight months. She stated "I realise that I'm right at the start of a steep learning curve. This is a very unique experience for me."

Charlotte was introduced as a medical intern. Her first scenes saw her perform "delicate" surgery to save the life of established character Jude Lawson (Ben Steel), with the help of Flynn Saunders (Martin Dingle-Wall). Chaves-Jacobsen branded Charlotte "a strong character with a lot of likable qualities." She told TV Week's Jason Herbison that she aspired to be like Charlotte, describing her as "very forgiving, very generous and very eager to please. She's unreal!" Herbison detailed the character's fictional backstory, writing that after she graduated from university, Charlotte opted to do her year of internship in Summer Bay, so she can care for her grandmother Gladys Adams (Moya O'Sullivan). Chaves-Jacobsen said "Charlotte's grandmother has Alzheimer's disease, so looking after he is a huge responsibility. At the moment, she doesn't have much of a life outside of home. She's just maintaining things." Chaves-Jacobsen thought the choices her character had made to give up her lifestyle and care for her grandmother were "unique and commendable". She also called her "very noble".

Charlotte is described by Network Seven as "pretty, smart, generous and sincere" and has "an uncanny ability to draw people out and make them feel good about themselves". Charlotte likes to meet new people and learn about their life. Charlotte works in medicine and enrolled in medical school so she could carry out work on a professional level. She is also described "fairly bright" but "no genius" so she struggles to get through her degree. Charlotte often surprises herself when she succeeds in her work and not one to boast Charlotte just "claims she was lucky".

Producers decided to write the character out of Home and Away in 2002. Chaves-Jacobsen told Jason Herbison from Inside Soap that "it's sad but it's just something that happens." The producers decided to kill the character off. Viewers initially see Charlotte making plans to leave the Bay and go to Vietnam. Following a goodbye party thrown by her friends, Charlotte decides to go for a swim before going to the airport. Chaves-Jacobsen said "Charlotte has a couple of hours to kill, and she wants to have one more dip at the beach. She is unaware that there is a big rip in the water and goes straight in." The character becomes caught in the rip and loses consciousness after struggling against it. She is rescued by Josh West (Daniel Collopy) and another lifeguard, who attempt to resuscitate her. Charlotte is transported to the hospital, where she suffers "serious complications" and dies.

== Storylines ==
Charlotte is first seen as a trainee doctor at Northern Districts hospital. Her first emergency is to treat her neighbour Jude Lawson (Ben Steel) who has been seriously injured in a motorcycle crash. Flynn Saunders (Martin Dingle-Wall) is on hand to help her in surgery and they are both able to save Jude's life. Charlotte soon becomes friends with Jude's teenage brother Noah Lawson (Beau Brady) and Seb Miller (Mitch Firth) who is living with them.

Charlotte's boyfriend Dr. Steve Kent (Don Hany) lives in the city and she hardly gets to spend any time with him. When he does visit, Steve frequently suggests that Charlotte moves to the city with him and put her grandmother Gladys Adams (Moya O'Sullivan) into a care home, which Charlotte refuses to do. Steve proposes and Charlotte accepts. On the night of the proposal, things take a horrible turn and when Noah, Jude and Hayley Smith (Bec Cartwright) return home they find a bruised Charlotte crying on the stairs. Charlotte then breaks up with Steve and later makes the agonising decision to commit Gladys to a home after she develops Alzheimer's and causes a fire.

Charlotte moves in with Sally Fletcher (Kate Ritchie). On the night of the school formal, Charlotte is called out to a car crash which involves Alex Poulos (Danny Raco), Brodie Hanson (Susie Rugg) and Miles Alcott (Steven Rooke). Charlotte and the paramedics battle to save Miles, but ultimately fail and he dies at the scene.

Following a post-HSC party, Charlotte and Jude begin dating. Charlotte later discovers she is pregnant with twins and turns to Flynn for support, much to Jude's anger as he feels that another one of his girlfriends feels more comfortable talking to Flynn. Jude then explains that his ex-girlfriend Shauna Bradley (Kylie Watson) had made a pass at Flynn several months earlier. Charlotte assures Jude she will never let him and down and he moves in with her at Sally's.

Charlotte wakes up one morning to find her morning sickness has eased and she goes into hospital to have ultrasound only to find she has miscarried and is left devastated. Rhys (Michael Beckley) and Shelley Sutherland (Paula Forrest), who had miscarried a son 15 years earlier, help Jude and Charlotte through their difficult time and arrange a memorial on the beach for the twist.

Shauna returns to Summer Bay and Charlotte worries if Jude will remain faithful. Jude later admits he still love Shauna and tells Charlotte he is leaving with her to go to Melbourne. Charlotte falls in into a depression and starts self-prescribing and develops an unhealthy attachment to a baby whose mother is having trouble. Sally and Flynn intervene before things get worse.

When her superior at Northern Districts, Dr. Carlingford (Alan Faulkner) verbally chastises her one time too many, Charlotte resigns and decides to leave Summer Bay. Prior to her departure, Charlotte learns she has inherited a large sum of money from a patient who has died in her care. Mav Patterson (Clayton Williams) convinces Charlotte to invest in a Vietnam orphanage and leave the Bay with him.

On the day of Charlotte's departure after a party at Sally's where she says a heartfelt goodbye to her friends she goes for a final swim in the ocean. However she is pulled under by a rip and is rescued by lifeguard Josh West (Daniel Collopy). During her last few seconds of consciousness, Charlotte sees a vision of Jude underwater. She is then resuscitated and hospitalised. After being admitted, Charlotte begins asking for Jude. Jude returns from Melbourne almost immediately and spends time with Charlotte who soon dies after suffering complications. Charlotte's death has an effect on several other people; Josh who blames himself for not putting up the right flags and resigns as a lifeguard, and Jade Sutherland (Kate Garven) who decides to "live for the moment". Following Charlotte's memorial service, Jude discovers she has not updated her will, leaving him as the sole beneficiary of her money. Jude decides to invest the money in the orphanage as he feels it is what Charlotte would have wanted.

== Reception ==
For her portrayal of Charlotte, Chaves-Jacobsen was nominated for the Logie Award for Most Popular New Female Talent in 2002.

Following her arrival, Jason Herbison of TV Week stated "A trip to hospital has become a much more pleasant experience in Summer Bay now that pretty intern Charlottes Adams is on duty." Sue Yeap of The West Australian commented on how Charlotte saved "many of Summer Bay's residents" and thought the character was the role that Jacobsen "will be best remembered by Australian audiences for".
