= Home and Away: Secrets and the City =

- Directed by: Robert Meillon
- Written by: Coral Drouyn
- Produced by: Julie McGauran; John Holmes
- Starring: Tammin Sursok; Rebecca Cartwright; Beau Brady; Chris Egan; Christie Hayes
- Distributed by: Universal Pictures (Australia)
- Release date: 2002
- Running time: 90 minutes
- Country: Australia

Home and Away: Secrets and the City is an exclusive-to-video and DVD special of the Australian soap opera Home and Away. In 2002, it was only released on video and a year later it received a DVD release. It is hosted by Home and Away star Tammin Sursok — in character as Dani Sutherland, not as herself — and contains three episodes, two of which were aired on TV: "Shattered Hearts" and "Broken Dreams", from the fifteenth season of Home and Away, while the third episode, "Secrets and the City" will never be aired on TV; it is only to be seen on the video and DVD.

The story follows the breakup of the Sutherland family as a secret from Rhys' past comes back to haunt him. Years ago, Rhys had an affair with Angie Russell and now she's living in Summer Bay with her son Dylan. Angie then reveals to Dylan that he is Rhys' son and he can't see Rhys' daughter Kirsty any more because they are brother and sister. Shelley discovers his secret when she listens to a tape that recorded Angie talking to Rhys. At a family dinner, Rhys tells all to his family, hurting Kirsty the most. The following day, the girls find a note from Rhys saying that he has left for good. Dani and Josh, along with Hayley and Noah, search for Rhys in the city.

== Episodes ==
The first two episodes featured, titled "Shattered Hearts" and "Broken Dreams" for the DVD release, are from the show's fifteenth season.

No. overall	No. in season	Title	Directed by	Written by	Original release date
3391	201	"Shattered Hearts"	Jonathan Geraghty	Sean Nash; Coral Drouyn	21 October 2002
Shelley finds out that Rhys had an affair with Angie and that Dylan is his son. Angie goes to the Sutherland house to talk to Shelley, resulting in her having the door slammed in her face.
3394	204	"Broken Dreams"	Jonathan Geraghty	Sean Nash; Coral Drouyn	24 October 2002
Rhys decides to tell his family the truth about his affair with Angie, and that Dylan is his son — causing Kirsty to run out of the house.
–	–	"Secrets and the City"	Robert Meillon	Coral Drouyn	N/A
Dani has a secret. It flashes back to Jade finding a note saying Rhys has left for good. Dani and Josh head for the city, picking up Hayley and Noah who have broken down. Shelley waits at home to see Rhys, with the others telling her lies so that she won't find out the truth. Josh's mum helps to find Rhys. Dani later finds him in a hotel room and begs him to come home. They arrive back home and Shelley has no idea he was even gone.

== Cast ==
=== Main cast ===
- Tammin Sursok - Dani Sutherland
- Rebecca Cartwright - Hayley Smith
- Beau Brady - Noah Lawson
- Chris Egan - Nick Smith
- Christie Hayes - Kirsty Sutherland
- Kate Garven - Jade Sutherland
- Mitch Firth - Seb Miller
- Paula Forrest - Shelley Sutherland
- Michael Beckley - Rhys Sutherland
- Ray Meagher - Alf Stewart
- Norman Coburn - Donald Fisher
- Kate Ritchie - Sally Fletcher
- Ada Nicodemou - Leah Patterson
- Susie Rugg - Brodie Hanson
- Danny Raco - Alex Poulos
- Daniel Collopy - Josh West
- Ben Unwin - Jesse McGregor
- Martin Dingle-Wall - Flynn Saunders
- Lynne McGranger - Irene Roberts
- Lyn Collingwood - Colleen Smart
- Sebastian Elmaloglou - Max Sutherland

=== Guest cast ===
- Laurie Foell - Angie Russell
- Brett Hicks-Maitland - Dylan Russell
- Cornelia Frances - Morag Bellingham
- Harry & James Roberts - V.J. Patterson
- Stephen Leeder - Inspector Carter
- Julieanne Newbould - Jackie West

== DVD ==
Home and Away: Secrets and the City
Set Details		Special Features
3 episodes; 1 disc; 1.33:1 aspect ratio (AU); 1.78:1 aspect ratio (UK); 89 mins; Language: English Dolby Digital 2.0		Featurettes: Behind the Scenes; Interviews; A Day In the Life of Bec and Beau
Release Dates		Featurettes: Behind the Scenes; Interviews; A Day In the Life of Bec and Beau
Region 2	Region 4	Featurettes: Behind the Scenes; Interviews; A Day In the Life of Bec and Beau
25 August 2003	29 October 2003	Featurettes: Behind the Scenes; Interviews; A Day In the Life of Bec and Beau

== Reception ==
Secrets and the City was a let down to fans of the show as they expected more to come from Australia's first DVD of Home and Away. Two episodes which had already aired on TV and the special episode was only 3 minutes longer than a normal episode. The special features on the release were a great contribution, cast interviews and behind-the-scenes with Bec Cartwright and Beau Brady.

== See also ==
- Home and Away
- Home and Away: Hearts Divided
- Home and Away: Romances
- Home and Away: Weddings
