= Kane Phillips =

- Home and Away character
- Portrayed by: Sam Atwell
- Duration: 2001–2005, 2008–2009
- First appearance: 9 April 2001
- Last appearance: 5 March 2009
- Book appearances: Hearts Divided; Dani on Trial; Second Chances
- Spin-off appearances: Home and Away: Hearts Divided (2003)
In-universe information
- Occupation: Construction worker Boat worker Gym worker Bartender
- Father: Gus Phillips
- Brothers: Scott Phillips
- Wife: Kirsty Sutherland (2004–09)
- Sons: Oliver Phillips

Kane Phillips is a fictional character from the Australian Channel Seven soap opera Home and Away, played by Sam Atwell. He made his first appearance in an episode aired on 9 April 2001 and made his final appearance on 5 March 2009.

In 2004, viewers saw Kane undergo a battle with testicular cancer.

== Storylines ==
=== 2001–05 ===
Kane is first seen in school at Summer Bay High when a group of Year 9 students talks about a Dance party he is hosting. Kane tries to woo one of his teachers, Shauna Bradley (Kylie Watson), by getting her tickets to see Savage Garden in concert, but she declines. Kane's brother, Scott (Nathaniel Dean), kidnaps Shauna, and Kane becomes an accessory. However, he later saves Shauna.

Kane tries his luck with Dani Sutherland (Tammin Sursok), who is currently on a break from Will Smith (Zac Drayson). This leads to Kane raping Dani one day while they are alone at her house. Will finds out and starts a fight with Kane but is jumped by several of his friends. Local headmaster Donald Fisher (Norman Coburn) intervenes but is given a kick for his troubles. Kane stands trial with Morag Bellingham (Cornelia Frances) presiding as the judge and is found not guilty, leaving Dani distraught. After Kane tearfully apologises to Dani, he leaves the bay.

The following year, Kane returns to the bay and agrees to a mediation session with Dani and the local counselor, Flynn Saunders (Martin Dingle-Wall). This fails when Dani refuses to forgive him as she still has nightmares. Kane later takes a job aboard a boat named The Mirgini, which is to set sail for the sesquicentenary celebrations of Summer Bay. It doesn't sit well when Dani's family and boyfriend, Josh West (Daniel Collopy), discover this. The boat begins sinking, and Kane is washed up on a deserted beach with Dani's mother, Shelley (Paula Forrest) and sister Kirsty for a week. Kane saves Shelley from a snake, and the three of them are eventually rescued.

Kane begins a relationship with Kirsty, which they must keep secret. Eventually, Shelley finds out and tells her husband, Rhys (Michael Beckley), and he warns Kane off. The couple then runs away as they can't live without each other. During their escape, Kane faces challenges in locating their workplace, and Kirsty comes dangerously close to a sexual assault from an intoxicated individual. Kane eventually comes to the realization that he must return Kirsty to her home, but she vehemently declines. In a tough love approach, Kane refers to her as a child and forcibly ejects her from his vehicle.

Kane soon returns to win Kirsty back. Seb Miller (Mitch Firth), Kirsty's current boyfriend, takes exception to Kane and punches him. Kirsty can't fight her feelings for Kane, and they reunite, breaking Seb's heart. When Kane and Kirsty become common knowledge again, Dani accepts it as she feels that trying to keep them apart will only bring them closer together. When Dani drives back from university one night, she runs over Kane.

Kane is rushed to the hospital, and Kirsty rushes to be by his side, maintaining a constant watch over him. Initially, Kane cannot recall the entire incident, but eventually, he provides a statement to the police. Kane wants Kirsty to relay his version of events when questioned, but the police instead question Kirsty at her home. Later, Dani faces trial, with Morag presiding as the judge once more. When the prosecutor hints that Dani had intentions of harming Kane, she breaks down on the witness stand, confessing to such intentions. The jury delivers a guilty verdict, leading to Dani's imprisonment. In the aftermath of the trial, Kane leaves town for a while. When the Sutherlands become trapped in a mineshaft, Kane is accused of wrongdoing. He assists in the rescue effort, injuring his hands in the process. Despite his efforts, Rhys remains distant and unfriendly towards Kane.

Kane later proposes to Kirsty, which she accepts. Their secret wedding is held on the same day as Rhys' wedding to Beth Hunter (Clarissa House). Irene Roberts (Lynne McGranger) offers the couple a room with her at the beach house. Kirsty later tells Kane she is pregnant with his baby, but this is revealed as a lie. Kane nearly strikes Kirsty during an argument, and she flees. When she returns, Kirsty takes out an AVO against Kane. They reconcile, and Kirsty actually falls pregnant but tragically miscarries.

Sarah Lewis (Luisa Hastings-Edge) tells Kirsty that Kane is cheating on her, but he denies it. Kane and Kirsty are drawn into a hostage situation with Sarah and several other Summer Bay residents, culminating in Sarah shooting Noah Lawson (Beau Brady) dead before committing suicide. Several weeks later, Kane discovers he has testicular cancer but keeps it quiet as Kirsty takes her HSC. He tells Flynn, a doctor, and his wife, Sally Fletcher (Kate Ritchie), that he plans to tell Kirsty that he is going on a boat trip for a week so she will not suspect he is having an operation. Kirsty eventually finds out and stands by him.

Kane is shocked when his father Gus (Peter Lamb) reappears in his life and is hostile towards him as Scott had beaten him in his childhood. After Kirsty convinces Kane to give his father a second chance, Kane finds himself framed for a robbery he didn't commit. Kane tries to contact Gus via an incarcerated Scott (now played by Josh Rosenthal) but gets nowhere. Morag, who previously ruled in Kane's favor twice in court, defends him. The evidence is stacked against Kane, and Scott lies during his testimony, exacerbating Kane's plight. Before the jury returns a verdict, Kane tells Kirsty to pack, and they flee the bay, with Kirsty several months pregnant.

=== 2008–09 ===
Three years on, Irene receives a mysterious phone call and goes to meet Kirsty. She agrees to look after Kane and Kirsty's son, Oliver (Oliver Davis), who is now three years old. Kane later turns up at the beach house and tells her that he and Kirsty want her to raise Oliver, as being on the run is no place for a child. Kirsty wants to give herself up after being on the run, but unknown to her, Kane robs the Diner and attempts to turn over a jewelry store in Yabbie Creek but is stopped by Larry Jefferies (Paul Gleason). Ric Dalby (Mark Furze) discovers Kane but is held at gunpoint.

Irene realizes Oliver is missing and figures Kane and Kirsty are fleeing again. Officers Jack Holden (Paul O'Brien) and Lara Fitzgerald (Rebecca George) begin a car chase with Kane and Kirsty. The car is found abandoned, and the police eventually corner Kane. After being quizzed about his crimes, Kane has pulled several robberies across several states. Morag agrees to represent Kane but accepts a deal to plead guilty to all charges in exchange for the exoneration of Irene and Kirsty. Kane is then jailed. Months later, Kane sends Kirsty a letter begging her to help him with money to fund an appeal, and regular letters are exchanged between the two as Kirsty tries to find the money for him.

At the end of the year, a delighted Oliver runs into Kane at the Caravan Park, and Kane asks him to lie to Kirsty about seeing him. Oliver can't keep it a secret, but Kirsty and her new partner Miles Copeland (Josh Quong Tart), don't believe him, thinking he is just missing his father. When Kane arrives, Miles and Kirsty are shocked.

Kane tries to win Kirsty back but is turned down. He tries again on the school formal night and is rejected again. Teenagers Jai Fernandez (Jordan Rodrigues) and Annie Campbell (Charlotte Best) ask Kane for a lift to look for Melody Jones (Celeste Dodwell), who has recently left a mental institute. They find Melody in the middle of the road; Kane swerves to avoid her and ends up crashing into the Diner, injuring himself and several other formal attendees. Kane recovers in the hospital and asks Kirsty to leave with him, which she does after ending things with Miles. In a matter of weeks, Kane and Kirsty are back and having some problems. Kane later punches Miles, which Jai and Oliver witness. Kane concedes defeat when he realizes Kirsty no longer loves him and leaves for his new job alone.
