= Beth Hunter =

- Home and Away character
- Portrayed by: Clarissa House
- Duration: 2003–2007
- First appearance: 17 April 2003
- Last appearance: 30 January 2007
- Introduced by: Julie McGuaran
- Book appearances: Dani on Trial
In-universe information
- Occupation: Surf club worker school secretary caravan park owner Bar owner
- Father: Graham Walters
- Husband: Jack Hunter (until 2002); Rhys Sutherland (2004–2005)
- Sons: Scott Hunter; Robbie Hunter; Henry Hunter
- Daughters: Kit Hunter; Matilda Hunter
- Stepdaughters: Dani Sutherland; Kirsty Sutherland; Laura DeGroot; Jade Sutherland
- Grandsons: Noah Hunter; Archie Hunter-Hyde

Elizabeth Ann Hunter (also Walters and Sutherland) is a fictional character from the Australian Channel Seven soap opera Home and Away, played by Clarissa House. She made her first on-screen appearance on 17 April 2003 and departed on 30 January 2007. The character died from injuries sustained in a car crash on 23 April 2007.

== Character development ==
The serial's official website described Beth as an "open-minded" female who holds a "strong sense of personal morality and integrity". When characters get to know Beth she shows a "delicious sense of humour". Beth is portrayed as a country girl who did not see herself as "anything but a farmer's wife" whilst married to Jack Hunter (Ian Lind). Marriage and family mean everything to Beth and she also ignored her husband's affair to keep her family together. They also said that Beth's "world fell apart" when Jack died.

One of Beth's main romances is with Tony Holden (Jon Sivewright). Sivewright said that both Beth and Tony have got "very good attitudes towards their kids" and are supportive to them and the community. Beth and Tony support each other when making parental decisions, even if they did not personally agree with the other's actions. Sivewright said that "even though Tony would question what Beth was doing, he was still supporting her. That’s what Beth does with Tony as well."

Beth features in many emotional storylines. House has said that after she had filmed an emotional scene, she exercised to forget about her character's feelings.

== Storylines ==
Beth is the mother of Scott (Kip Gamblin), Kit (Amy Mizzi), Robbie (Jason Smith), Henry (Tobi Atkins) and Matilda (Indiana Evans). Beth was married to Jack, the father of her five children until his death in 2002. Beth had known about Jack's ongoing affair with Valerie Squires (Denise Roberts) and did not tell the children, thinking it would hurt their family. It later emerges Scott knew secretly and kept it to himself for the same reason as Beth.

Beth arrives in Summer Bay and meets Rhys Sutherland (Michael Beckley) when their respective eldest children, Scott and Dani (Tammin Sursok) become a couple. When Kit arrives and begins drinking excessively, Rhys is on hand to support Beth. After Kit leaves for rehab, Beth and Rhys become a couple and Rhys later proposes. Following money troubles, Beth is forced to pull the rest of her children from their boarding schools and they all move in with the Sutherlands. In early 2004, Beth and Rhys marry in an intimate ceremony on the beach with most of the family attending and Alf Stewart (Ray Meagher) and Colleen Smart (Lyn Collingwood) as witnesses. The day is marred when Rhy's daughter Kirsty (Christie Hayes) elopes with her fiancé Kane Phillips (Sam Atwell) and argument ensues and Beth is forced to keep the peace.

Beth and Rhy's marriage is tested numerous times by the many dramas of their combined brood, but nothing can prepare them for the return of Rhy's ex-wife, Shelley (Paula Forrest) when Kirsty suffers kidney problems and needs a transplant. Rhys gradually falls in love with Shelley again and leaves Summer Bay, breaking Beth's heart. Wanting to move on with her life, Beth reverts to her previous married name and swaps houses with Sally Fletcher (Kate Ritchie) and Flynn Saunders (Joel McIlroy). When her new neighbour, widower Tony Holden arrives, Beth is taken with him and they become a couple.

Graham Walters (Doug Scroope), Beth's father arrives in Summer Bay announcing he has sold his farm and when it is revealed he has married the much younger Amanda Vale (Holly Brisley), Beth is disgusted and constantly finds herself at odds with Amanda, as she had previously tried to manipulate Scott into believing she was pregnant. When Graham suffers a massive heart attack and recovers in hospital, he makes peace with Beth, telling her that he does not want to continue living should he suffer a relapse. Graham suffers another heart attack and is pronounced brain dead. Beth and Amanda battle over turning the machine off. Amanda wins the fight and is pleased as she is Graham's wife and needs to keep him alive in order to render the pre-nuptial agreement invalid and gain his assets. Robbie later turns the machine off and Beth is shocked but understanding. Beth tells Amanda she does not care about the money but wants Graham's war medals, which Amanda later gives her.

Feeling trapped and longing to pursue her dreams of travelling the world, Beth is ready to go but Tony is firmly settled in Summer Bay. Tony supports her and she leaves to visit Scott and his partner Hayley Smith (Bec Cartwright) and their son, Noah in France then she visits Robbie, his wife Tasha (Isabel Lucas) and their daughter/stepdaughter Ella in America. On the day, Beth is due to return home, Kit goes into labour and Tony decides to wait for her to return. After Beth fails to appear, he assumes she has gone directly to the hospital and leaves to find her. On the way, Tony discovers a serious road traffic accident and is stopped by his son Jack (Paul O'Brien), who is one of the police officers on the scene who tries to break it to him that the body recovered from the wreckage is Beth. Tony, Kit and Matilda are left devastated and a memorial service for Beth is held in Summer Bay before her body is buried in her home town of Adelaide.

== Reception ==
Sacha Molitorisz of The Sydney Morning Herald said that the episode featuring Beth and Rhys' wedding was better suited to "die hard fans". They criticised the plot for being "unengaging" and opined that the music, performances and dialogue were "painful" and "patchy".
