= Alex Poulos =

- Home and Away character
- Portrayed by: Danny Raco
- Duration: 2001–2004, 2007
- First appearance: 26 February 2001
- Last appearance: 19 June 2007
- Introduced by: Julie McGuaran (2001); Cameron Welsh (2007)
In-universe information
- Occupation: Electrician; Diner waiter and chef Soccer player
- Father: Theo Poulos
- Mother: Helen Poulos
- Brothers: Dimitri Poulos; Chris Poulos
- Sisters: Leah Patterson-Baker
- Wife: Brodie Hanson (2005–2007)
- Uncles: Con Poulos
- Nephews: VJ Patterson; Theo Poulos
- First cousins: Christina Poulos; Effie

Alexi "Alex" Poulos is a fictional character from the Australian soap opera Home and Away, portrayed by Danny Raco. He made his first on screen appearance on 26 February 2001 and departed on 13 February 2004. He returned for a brief guest stint in 2007, arriving on 4 June 2007 and made his final appearance on 19 June 2007.

== Casting ==
Raco joined the cast in 2001 and his first scenes began airing on 26 February 2001. He quit the serial in late 2003 to pursue a career in directing and finished filming in January 2004, his final scenes aired in mid-February 2004.

== Characterisation ==
Early into Alex's arrival, Raco explained about his character's personality. "Alex isn't very secure, even though he would like everyone to think he is. He comes across as the macho type and thinks that is the way to be accepted. He still has a whole lot to learn in life."

== Storylines ==
Alex arrives in Summer Bay several days before his sister Leah's (Ada Nicodemou) wedding to Vinnie Patterson (Ryan Kwanten). Alex reveals that he wants to escape his parents and has fallen out with their uncle Con (Nicholas Papademetriou) over his electrical business. Alex begins working at the Diner with Leah and starts his own business, Alex Electrix and secures a contract with school principal Donald Fisher (Norman Coburn) at Summer Bay High.

Alex begins to pursue Dani Sutherland (Tammin Sursok), who is on a break from her boyfriend, Will Smith (Zac Drayson) and they go on one date but Dani is not romantically interested in Alex. At the end of the date, they argue and Alex accidentally knocks Dani's foster sister, Brodie Hanson (Susie Rugg) off her bike while driving. Brodie recovers after a successful operation and she develops feelings for Alex. They become a couple and are happy for a while but once Alex feels things are getting too serious between them, he decides to end things with her.

Miles Alcott (Steven Rooke), Alex's childhood friend arrives in the bay and begins dating Brodie, much to Alex's jealousy. When Miles talks to Alex about his feelings for Brodie at the School Formal, he denies being jealous. On the way home from the Formal, Alex is driving with Brodie and Miles as passengers. He turns up the music and fails to notice a pothole in the road, which results in a crash, leaving Brodie and Miles injured. Alf Stewart (Ray Meagher) arrives on the scene and raises the alarm. Doctor Charlotte Adams (Stephanie Chaves-Jacobsen) and several paramedics battle to save Miles when he begins arresting but Miles dies at the scene. Brodie blames Alex for Miles' death and Alex sinks into a depression, culminating in a breakdown at work one day. Alex's brother Chris (Alex Blias) tries to snap him out of it and tries to reason with an unrelenting Brodie. On the day of the coronial inquest, a verdict of accidental death is reached. Brodie eventually forgives Alex and both are able to move on.

Alex begins seeing an older woman named Kelli Edwards (Alyssa-Jane Cook), who owns the Diner's cake supplier. This relationship comes with complications as Kelly has two children and is separated from her violent husband Jason (Benj Daddario). When Jason finds out, he attacks Alex. Jesse McGregor (Ben Unwin) intervenes and beats up Jason. Jason continues to harass Kelly and is soon arrested. Kelly soon leaves the Bay with the children, leaving Alex heartbroken. Alex becomes close to Brodie once again but it is short-lived once Brodie completes Year 12 and decides to go travelling. They spend the night together before Brodie leaves.

Alex starts a relationship with Hayley Smith (Bec Cartwright) who has recently broken up with her boyfriend, Noah Lawson (Beau Brady) but they remain sharing the same house. Alex soon moves in but when Brodie returns, Alex is caught in a love triangle with the two girls. Hayley and Brodie are involved in a car crash which leaves Hayley disfigured and with memory loss Alex realises he still loves Brodie and proposes to her and they decide to leave the Bay for Cyprus but are unsure of how to break the news to Hayley. Brodie and Alex later marry overseas.

Three years later, Alex returns without Brodie and reveals their marriage is over. He rents a Caravan at the Summer Bay Caravan Park and soon becomes friends with Cassie Turner (Sharni Vinson). It emerges Alex is dealing drugs and hides a stash at Leah's house and everything is uncovered when his 5-year-old nephew VJ, accidentally finds the drugs and is suspected to have swallowed some. VJ is fine but Leah is upset. Leah agrees not to inform the police but orders Alex to leave and stay out of her life and he leaves to stay with relatives in Greece.

== Reception ==
For his portrayal of Alex, Raco was nominated for Most Popular New Male Talent at the 2002 Logie Awards.
