= Noah Lawson =

Fictional character from the Australian Channel Seven soap opera Home and Away

- Home and Away character
- Portrayed by: Beau Brady
- Duration: 2000–2004
- First appearance: 6 September 2000
- Last appearance: 26 November 2004
- Book appearances: Home and Away:The Long Goodbye
- Spin-off appearances: Home and Away: Secrets and the City (2002)
In-universe information
- Occupation: Student at Summer Bay High (2000–01); Counsellor (2001–04)
- Mother: Jill Lawson
- Brothers: Jude Lawson
- Wife: Hayley Smith (2004)

Noah Lawson is a fictional character from the Australian Channel Seven soap opera Home and Away, played by Beau Brady. The character debuted on-screen during the episode airing on 6 September 2000.

== Characterization ==
Jacqueline Maley writing for The Sydney Morning Herald refers to Noah as a "bad boy" type character.

== Storylines ==
=== Backstory ===
Noah suffered a troubled childhood when his father left his mother, Jill (Tracy Mann) to raise him and his elder brother Jude (Ben Steel) alone. Jill's religious over-zealousness drove Jude away as they grew and as a result, she became protective of Noah. One night, Jill's attempt in order to protect Noah from "The Devil" by lighting candles went awry when Noah's sheets caught alight. Jill was subsequently institutionalized and Noah went to live with Jude.

=== 2000–04 ===
Noah is first seen when he saves Hayley Smith (Bec Cartwright) from a gang of thugs at a nightclub by offering her a ride on his motorcycle. After an initially shaky start, Noah and Hayley begin dating and after both fail Year 12, they repeat together the following year. Their relationship is seemingly steady until Noah kisses Skye Patterson (Angela Keep) at Hayley's 18th birthday party. As a result of their breakup, Noah descends into alcoholism but with the help of Flynn Saunders (Martin Dingle-Wall), he is able to begin a "controlled drinking" therapy. Noah and Hayley reconcile but this is tested when Jill arrives on the scene and wants to rebuild their relationship. Noah isn't keen at first and worries when Jill manages to influence Hayley after learning that her father Ken (Anthony Phelan) had died the previous year. Jude, Noah and Irene Roberts (Lynne McGranger), Hayley's foster mother worry about the amount of time Hayley is spending with Jill. After talking to a local minister, Jill finally agrees to get some further psychiatric help and Noah and Jude forgive her.

After completing his HSC, Noah becomes a counsellor at the Drop-in Centre along with Flynn, Gypsy Nash (Kimberley Cooper), Shelley Sutherland (Paula Forrest). Noah and Hayley move into an apartment, dubbed "The Palace" along with Dani Sutherland (Tammin Sursok) and Josh West (Daniel Collopy). Noah and Hayley split the following year after Hayley kisses Josh and they begin seeing other people. Kit Hunter (Amy Mizzi) shows a romantic interest in Noah after he helps with her alcoholism but he rebuffs her.

Noah and Hayley reunite after Hayley loses her memory in a car crash with Brodie Hanson (Susie Rugg). Hayley soon regains her memory and is devastated when she remembers Alex Poulos (Danny Raco), who she had been dating prior to the accident, has left her for Brodie. On the night of Hayley's 21st birthday, Noah proposes and she accepts. Hayley's suggestion of inviting Jill and having a church wedding does not sit well with Noah. In the end the couple marry in an outdoor ceremony along with Kane (Sam Atwell) and Kirsty Phillips (Christie Hayes), who are renewing their vows.

When Sarah Lewis (Luisa Hastings-Edge) begins terrorizing Summer Bay wanting retribution for the death of her boyfriend, Felix Walters (Josh Lawson), she storms Leah Patterson's (Ada Nicodemou) house where a number of Bay residents have gathered and she demands Felix's killer steps forward. Noah tries to explain that Sarah was the one who killed Felix by injecting him with Crystal Meth. After Sarah whacks Detective Peter Baker (Nicholas Bishop) in the head and puts him in a coma, But he (still conscious) tells Leah that Vinnie is alive, After Noah fails to make Sarah realise that she killed Felix, She then starts a countdown prompting Flynn to try to talk her out of it while Noah screams "NO!!" Allowing Flynn to wrestle Sarah as the gun goes off while everyone escaped, She then goes after Dani who arrives at the house with Rhys, Noah follows Sarah and is shot dead in the process. Sarah then turns the gun on herself and commits suicide. Following his death, Noah appears in many of Hayley's visions during the grieving process and makes one final appearance during the 2004 Season finale.

== Reception ==
For his portrayal of Noah, Brady was nominated for the "Most Popular New Male Talent" Logie in 2001. He was also nominated for the Silver Logie for "Most Popular Actor" for three years in a row from 2003 to 2005. The episode featuring Noah's funeral won writer Louise Crane-Bowes an Australian Writers Guild award in 2005. The episode featuring Noah's appearance as a ghost to say goodbye to Hayley also earned a nomination in this category in the same year.

Mark Juddery of The Sun-Herald described Noah's death at the hands of Sarah Lewis as the "Biggest Event" in the series' history in his article about television characters being killed off in order to boost ratings.
