= Angie Russell =

Angela Russell
- Home and Away character
- Portrayed by: Laurie Foell
- Duration: 2002–2004
- First appearance: 26 September 2002
- Last appearance: 24 May 2004
- Introduced by: Coral Drouyn
In-universe information
- Occupation: Deputy Principal of Summer Bay High (2002–2003)
- Mother: Monica Markham
- Sons: Dylan Russell
- Daughters: Tasha Andrews
- Granddaughters: Ella Hunter
- First cousins: Josie Russell

Angie Russell is a fictional character from the Australian soap opera Home and Away, played by Laurie Foell. She made her first screen appearance during the episode broadcast on 26 September 2002. Foell departed on 21 March 2003, but her character subsequently appeared as a ghost in her daughter's dreams on 24 May 2004.

== Storylines ==
Angie arrives in Summer Bay to take on the position of Deputy Principal and meets her former flame Rhys Sutherland (Michael Beckley). Her son, Dylan (Brett Hicks-Maitland) immediately takes a shine to Rhys' daughter Kirsty (Christie Hayes). Angie later drops a massive bombshell, revealing that Dylan is Rhys' son from a one-night stand during his marriage, sending shockwaves through the Sutherland family. Rhys' marriage to Shelley (Paula Forrest) gradually breaks down. In the midst of this, Angie begins a relationship with recently released Jesse McGregor (Ben Unwin) and even lies to Detective Mike Carter (Stephen Leeder) about Jesse's whereabouts on the night of a murder.

Angie begins playing mind games with Nick when she catches him fighting with Dylan. Angie uses her feminine wiles to seduce Nick and then rejects him. When Nick confronts her in a classroom one day, Angie starts screaming and tearing at her clothing, and Nick is framed for sexual assault as a result. Even after she dropped the charges, the police still pursue Nick. Justice Morag Bellingham (Cornelia Frances), has prior information about a scandal Angie had been involved in at her nephew Duncan's (Brendan McKensy) school in the city where Angie had taught and seduced one of her students, Stephen Ross (Oliver Ackland) but it backfires when Angie takes a defamation of character suit against Morag and Stephen lies on the stand in the belief that he and Angie will be together. Nick is then tried and found guilty of and sentenced to community service at a retirement home.

The Bay then turns on Angie, resulting in her becoming more and more unstable. She torches Scott Hunter's boatshed and blackmails Josh West (Daniel Collopy) over his dealing with a local councillor. Toward the end of Angie's reign of terror over Summer Bay, Angie discovers Dylan is not Rhys' son and worse was to come when Nick with the help of Kirsty, her sister Jade (Kate Garven) and Seb Miller (Mitch Firth) and gains a measure of revenge by videoing Angie threatening Nick. Following this, Angie's employment is terminated by Principal Paris Burnett (Rhett Giles)

Several weeks later, Angie's body is found and the suspect list includes Dylan, the Sutherlands, Nick, Josh, Jesse, Sally Fletcher (Kate Ritchie) and Irene Roberts (Lynne McGranger). They are all questioned and the police are convinced Rhys is the murderer, but as they are about to formally charge him with Angie's murder Dylan confesses to arguing with Angie then pushing her, resulting in her death when her head struck the edge of a table. Dylan stands trial in the city and is acquitted. Angie later appears in her daughter Tasha Andrews' (Isabel Lucas) dream as a ghost.

== Reception ==
Writer David Dale for The Age described Angie as a "Supreme Super-bitch" in his article about the serial. He also opined the decision to kill her was a tactic to help Channel 7 gain ratings against the impending return of Network Ten's Big Brother. and likened Angie's killing off to the axing of Geoff Hill, the then-managing director of Sydney's branch of seven. Dale added "Angie's sin, by contrast, was that she was too interesting. Knocking her off was the most powerful way to hang on to Home and Away viewers who might have been getting a bit jaded after 15 years of sun, surf and teenage angst." The ratings for the serial rose to 1.7 million viewers for the episode where Angie's body was discovered.

The revelation of Angie's killer and the aftermath raised audience figures in Australia to 1.5 million viewers, beating Network Ten's Big Brother. A writer for What's on TV included Angie on their list of "The 50 most evil soap villains of all time". The writer stated "Actress Laurie Foell caused chaos not once but TWICE in Home and Away as evil Angela Russell and, later, as Angie's twisted cousin Josie." A writer from the Sunday Mercury described Angie as a "crackpot" and opined that the serial should "take lessons from British soaps about how to milk storylines", before adding "They won't be dragging this one out for months, as the killer confesses next week!"
