= Hunter Elizabeth =

Hunter Elizabeth may refer to:

- Hunter, Elizabeth, fictional character
- Hunter Elizabeth, singer on The Voice U.S. (season 4)
