= Jade Sutherland =

- Home and Away character
- Portrayed by: Kate Garven
- Duration: 2000–2004
- First appearance: 19 June 2000
- Last appearance: 3 June 2004
In-universe information
- Occupation: Student; Kiosk worker
- Father: John DeGroot
- Mother: Helen DeGroot
- Adoptive father: Rhys Sutherland
- Adoptive mother: Shelley Sutherland
- Stepmother: Beth Hunter
- Brothers: Scott Hunter(step); Robbie Hunter (step); Henry Hunter (step)
- Sisters: Dani Sutherland (adoptive); Kirsty Sutherland (adoptive); Kit Hunter(step); Matilda Hunter (step)
- Uncles: Pete Sutherland
- Nephews: Oliver Phillips
- First cousins: Max Sutherland

Jade Sutherland is a fictional character from the Australian Channel Seven soap opera Home and Away, played by Kate Garven. She appeared in the series from 19 June 2000 until 3 June 2004.

== Character development ==
Jade is introduced into the series as part of the new Sutherland family who move from the city to live in Summer Bay. Jade was Garven's first role on television. Garven said that working on Home and Away was a fun experience and that she had developed a good working relationship with those who play her on-screen family.

Jade is portrayed as the "quieter" and "dreamy" of the Sutherland sisters, a keen book reader who likes to help out those less fortunate than herself. Jade is prone to illness and is a long sufferer of asthma. Jade's family see her as "fragile" and "vulnerable" and feel the need to treat her with care. The serial's official website describe her as being "stronger that many people realise" despite her fragile nature. Jade has also learnt to play on her weakness to get her own way in life. Jade is strong willed in knowing what she wants from life and does not like being told to do something she does not agree with. Garven described Jade stating that "she is a nice person and a very sweet girl. She can be a little flighty and she always talks too much. She tends to babble on but genuinely cares for people."

Jade and her twin sister Kirsty Sutherland (Christie Hayes) claim to share a "telepathic" connection in which they know when one another are in trouble. The theme was a prominent feature throughout Jade and Kirsty's tenure. However, producers later implemented a storyline in which Jade discovers that she is not related to the Sutherlands. The revelation that she was mixed up with another baby after birth conflicted their ideas of a telepathic connection between twins.

Jade enters into a relationship with the character of Nick Smith and (Chris Egan) who plays Nick said that he and Garven had "a lot of fun together" portraying their relationship. In one storyline Jade and Nick attempt to appear on a reality television series titled "The Dorm", which radio host Garth Russell plays the director, who Jade attempts to impress.

== Storylines ==
Jade arrives in Summer Bay from the city with her twin sister, Kirsty and their older sister Dani (Tammin Sursok) when their parents Rhys (Michael Beckley) and Shelley (Paula Forrest). Jade begins dating Duncan Stewart (Brendan McKensy), while Kirsty dates Nick. When Brodie Hanson (Susie Rugg) moves in with the Sutherlands, she and Jade form a sisterly bond after they share a room for a while.

Jade soon resumes her ballet classes but is unnerved by a rival, Tonya (Sharni Vinson) and soon begins having issues with her body and develops bulimia as a result. She and Duncan soon break up after Duncan's behaviour has become uncontrollable following his mother Ailsa's (Judy Nunn) death. Jade later begins a more serious relationship with Nick after he and Kirsty split. Their relationship gets problems when Vice Principal Angie Russell (Laurie Foell) mind games starts playing with Nick and abusing him. Also after Angie is killed, Nick is still having difficulty getting close to other people, Jade and Nick don't want to give up their relationship and their love survives ultimately.

After a while, Jade Nick makes it clear that she is ready for the first time sex. Nick tells her that he is afraid he can't handle it because of his trauma to sexual abuse. A while later Nick says he is ready, but every time they are with two intimate, he comes up with an excuse not to have sex with her. It becomes clear to Jade that he is not ready at all, but that he suppressed his trauma for her. She then tells him he can take the time that he needs and that he doesn't have to do something he can't handle. Yet Nick dumps her because he doesn't want that she has to wait for him. They both think it's better that way, but realize after a while that they can't be without each other and came back together.

After talking to a psychologist for a few months, Nick seems to have gotten over his traumas and they're having sex. Both for the first time. However Jade then falls for Seb Miller (Mitch Firth), Nick's best friend, and she drops Nick to begin a relationship with Seb. Jade later discovers she was switched at birth with Laura DeGroot (also portrayed by Hayes), the revelation shatters her, leading to an identity crisis which sends her off the rails, culminating in a suspension from school.

Duncan returns to town and tries to rekindle things with Jade, despite the fact she is now with Seb. Duncan and Jade do drugs one night, which leaves Jade worse for wear. On the night of Robbie Hunter (Jason Smith) and Hayley Smith's (Bec Hewitt) combined birthday party, Duncan steals Robbie's car keys and drives the car while high and involves Jade in a drag race. Seb tries to stop them by jumping on the bonnet but Duncan keeps driving and the car goes over a cliff. The Sutherlands fear that Jade has been killed but she survives with comparatively minor injuries in contrast to Seb, who is left paralysed. After Seb decides to join his grandfather Donald Fisher (Norman Coburn) in the Whitsundays, Jade decides she wants to go too as she feels there is nothing for her in the Bay. Her family tell her they are still there if she wants them. Jade soon then leaves with Kit Hunter (Amy Mizzi) for a fresh start in the city to get to know her biological family, the DeGroots. Jade returns several months later when Kirsty undergoes vital surgery and Shelley donates a kidney to her.

== Reception ==
In the book Philip Ardagh's book of howlers, blunders and random mistakery, Ardagh claimed that Jade and Kirsty's "amazing telepathic empathy" was conveniently forgotten by scriptwriters when they were revealed to be unrelated. He added that it must have been a "surprise" to viewers who had previously seen their connection play out. A columnist for the Sunday Mail thought the plot was questionable and said "A family arrive and claim Jade was swapped at birth with their daughter. You couldn't make it up."
