= Seb Miller =

- Home and Away character
- Portrayed by: Mitch Firth
- Duration: 2001–2004
- First appearance: 21 June 2001
- Last appearance: 28 April 2004
In-universe information
- Occupation: Student
- Father: Alan Fisher
- Mother: Anna Miller
- Grandfathers: Donald Fisher
- Grandmothers: Barbara Stewart
- Uncles: Byron Fisher
- Aunts: Bobby Marshall; Rebecca Nash
- First cousins: Sam Marshall
- Other relatives: Alf Stewart; Morag Bellingham; Celia Stewart; Colleen Smart; Duncan Stewart

Sebastian "Seb" Miller is a fictional character from the Australian soap opera Home and Away, played by Mitch Firth. He first appeared on 21 June 2001 and departed on 28 April 2004.

== Casting ==
Actor Norman Coburn, who played Donald Fisher, was asked to help out during the auditions for Seb. Coburn recalled that Firth seemed to be "very nervous" and when he asked why, Firth told him that he was put off by his presence. After Coburn retreated, Firth went on to secure the part.

In 2003, Firth, then 17, was one of almost 500 performers who went on a day's strike following failed negotiations with the Screen Producers Association of Australia (SPAA). Firth said "A single episode is sold to the UK for over $100,000, so there are 48 other countries that we sell to that we don't see any of the money from."

== Storylines ==
Seb and his mother, Anna (Elizabeth Maywald) arrive in Summer Bay. After Anna is rejected from the local drop-in centre, they hide out at the Caravan Park in a run-down disused van. Kirsty Sutherland (Christie Hayes) discovers them but lets them stay. Seb and Kirsty become friends and begin dating. Anna takes a job working for Jude Lawson (Ben Steel) as an after-hours cleaner at Summer Bay High. One day she collapses and is hospitalized. Anna keeps asking for Donald Fisher (Norman Coburn) but he arrives too late and Anna dies. Seb learns that Donald's son Alan (Simon Kay) is his father, making Donald his grandfather. He then realises the significance of Alan's novel On the Crest of a Wave which Anna has given him and is currently on the syllabus.

Jude and his younger brother, Noah (Beau Brady) invite Seb to live with them. Noah discovers Seb's identity and Seb later vandalizes Donald's house and is caught. Donald is about to press charges but Noah tells him Seb is his grandson. He then drops the charges and organises for DNA tests to be conducted. The tests prove that Seb and Donald are related. Seb struggles with dyslexia and Sally Fletcher (Kate Ritchie) organises remedial classes. Seb and Donald grow closer but have a falling out when a picture of a Donald in the 1970s is taken by Nick Smith (Chris Egan), who photocopies it and plasters it all over the school. Donald initially blames Seb until Nick confesses, however Seb decides to leave school. After Seb suffers an accident on a surfboard, Nick saves his life and they become friends.

Seb later moves in with Donald and they make plans to go to visit Rebecca (Belinda Emmett), Donald's only surviving child, in Canada and but Donald suffers a heart attack and the trip is cancelled. During this time, Seb falls out with Kirsty who tries to change his image. Kirsty's sister, Dani (Tammin Sursok) mentions that Seb has a similar style to Josh West (Daniel Collopy), who Kirsty recently had a crush on, Seb dumps her. He then begins seeing another girl Lara but realises he still loves Kirsty and kisses her at a party. Lara later dumps Seb.

Seb becomes annoyed that nobody remembers the anniversary of Anna's death. Donald organises a memorial service on the beach. Soon after, Seb auditions for a role in the school Rock Eisteddfod and stars opposite Kirsty's twin sister Jade (Kate Garven). This causes tension with Nick who become suspicious of Seb and Jade. The production is cancelled and Seb reveals to Nick he is still in love with Kirsty. Mikey Dunn (Trent Atkinson), an autistic student enrols at the school and Seb is responsible for looking after him. Mikey's behaviour causes many problems such as going missing from the Arcade and then being found naked in the school. Donald plans to retire to the Whitsundays with June Reynolds (Rowena Wallace) and gives Seb the choice of joining him or staying in Summer Bay. Seb opts to stay with his great uncle Alf Stewart (Ray Meagher) who is recovering from a brain tumour.

Sally's brother Christopher returns for Sally's wedding to Flynn Saunders (Joel McIlroy) and is attracted to Seb and tries to kiss him. Embarrassed by his actions, Chris flees but Seb tells him it is ok to be different. Having reunited with Kirsty, The couple plan to have sex but Kane Phillips (Sam Atwell) returns and Kirsty is still drawn to him and dumps Seb, leaving him devastated. Seb stops eating as a result and begins relentlessly exercising resulting in him collapsing. Jade helps Seb and she dumps Nick to begin a relationship with Seb.

Alf's son Duncan (Brendan McKensy) returns to the bay and becomes friendly with his ex, Jade again and influences her into taking drugs. Seb warns Jade of his cousin's behaviour and tries to convince her to keep away from him but she will not listen. When Duncan initiates a drag race, Seb jumps on the bonnet to stop them but Duncan, high, keeps on driving. The car goes over a cliff and Seb and Jade are left injured. Seb is left crippled and using a wheelchair and dumps Jade. Donald returns from the Whitsundays to collect him and they leave. Duncan apologises to Donald at Alf's 60th birthday the following year. Donald returns in 2007 and mentions Seb has set up his own photography business.
