= Shelley Sutherland =

- Home and Away character
- Portrayed by: Paula Forrest
- Duration: 2000–04, 2009
- First appearance: 19 June 2000
- Last appearance: 28 October 2009
- Introduced by: John Holmes (2000); Julie McGuaran (2003–04); Cameron Welsh (2009)
- Book appearances: Dani on Trial
- Spin-off appearances: Home and Away: Secrets and the City
In-universe information
- Occupation: Counsellor; Caravan Park Owner; Foster parent
- Father: Geoff Webb
- Mother: Avril Webb
- Sisters: Kerry Webb
- Husband: Rhys Sutherland (1982–2003, 2005–)
- Daughters: Dani Sutherland; Kirsty Sutherland; Laura DeGroot
- Adoptive daughters: Jade Sutherland
- Grandsons: Oliver Phillips

Michelle "Shelley" Sutherland (also Webb) is a fictional character from the Australian soap opera Home and Away, portrayed by actress Paula Forrest. She first appeared in the episode airing on from 19 June 2000 and departed in the finale of 2002. She made sporadic returns in 2003 and 2004. She made her final appearance on 28 October 2009.

== Casting ==
The character is part of the five-strong Sutherland family introduced as the new owners of the Summer Bay Caravan Park. Forrest was delighted to join the cast as matriarch Shelley, saying "It's wonderful. I was aware of the show before I started working on it, but I didn't appreciate how big it all was." Forrest received helpful advice from Debra Lawrence, who played caravan park owner Pippa Ross. Shelley's husband Rhys Sutherland (Michael Beckley) often loses his temper, but Shelley is "always ready to step in and smooth things over." Forrest said that things go wrong for the family from the moment they arrive, including the power going out and one of the twins being bitten by a spider.

In 2009, Forrest made a brief return to the serial as Shelley in order to facilitate her on-screen daughter, Kirsty's (Christie Hayes) departure.

== Storylines ==
Shelley arrives in Summer Bay with her husband Rhys (Michael Beckley) and their three teenage daughters, Dani (Tammin Sursok), Kirsty and Jade (Kate Garven) after purchasing Summer Bay House and the caravan park from Pippa Ross (Debra Lawrence). Shortly after arriving, Shelley starts work as a counsellor at the Sarah McKay drop-in centre. One of her first cases is Brodie Hanson (Susie Rugg), a teenage runaway who has fled her abusive mother. Shelley takes Brodie home and she and Rhys later foster her.

Geoff (John Sheerin), Shelley's father arrives in the bay with news that he is separating from her mother, Avril (Suzanne Dudley) and brings his new girlfriend, Linda with him, which causes friction. When a storm occurs and Geoff goes missing, Shelley begins to think the worst and feels guilty after arguing with him. Geoff is found safe and sound and they resume their relationship. Avril arrives and she and Geoff decide to give their marriage another chance and leave.

When Dani is raped by Kane Phillips (Sam Atwell), Shelley supports her and the case goes to court. Kane, however is found not guilty. The following Year, Kane returns as a deckhand aboard a cruise ship during the Bay's sesquicentennial celebrations. The boat sinks and Shelley and Kirsty are marooned with Kane on an island. Shelley is almost attacked by a snake but Kane saves her. Kirsty later develops an attraction to Kane that puts strain on the family.

Shelley later discovers that Rhys allegedly has a son, Dylan Russell (Brett Hicks-Maitland), as a result of a one-night stand with old flame, new vice principal; Angie (Laurie Foell) almost twenty years ago. This puts Rhys and Shelley's marriage under tremendous strain. Shelley tries to make the marriage work, even offering Dylan a place to stay. Angie confesses that Rhys is not Dylan's father but the damage already has been done and Shelley moves to the city. She returns and asks the girls to leave with her but they refuse to budge and she leaves again. Shelley soon files for divorce and meets David Callahan (Felix Williamson; Nicholas Cassim), a city lawyer who later represents Dani after she stands trial for running over Kane. Dani loses and is imprisoned. Shelley next appears when Kane, who has now married Kirsty, demands to see her after Kirsty flees to the city following a pregnancy lie. After dropping Kirsty back in the Bay, Shelley finds herself at war with Beth (Clarissa House), Rhys's new wife but they eventually make their peace.

When Kirsty suffers kidney problems during pregnancy, Shelley is a match, but David, who has an irrational fear of scars is against her doing so and gives her an ultimatum. Shelley chooses to save her daughter's life and she and David end their relationship. After Rhys and Beth separate, he joins Shelley in the city and they remarry the following year. Shelley returns five years later to comfort Kirsty after she miscarries Miles Copeland's (Josh Quong Tart) baby. Kirsty then decides to take her son Oliver (Oliver Davis) and move to the city with Shelley. They leave without telling Miles.
