= Dani Sutherland =

- Home and Away character
- Portrayed by: Tammin Sursok
- Duration: 2000–2004
- First appearance: 19 June 2000
- Last appearance: 12 November 2004
- Introduced by: John Holmes
- Book appearances: Dani on Trial; Prisoner No. 2549971
- Spin-off appearances: Home and Away: Secrets and the City (2002); Home and Away: Hearts Divided (2003)
In-universe information
- Occupation: Student; Kiosk worker Journalist; Novelist
- Father: Rhys Sutherland
- Mother: Shelley Sutherland
- Sisters: Kirsty Sutherland; Jade Sutherland (adoptive); Laura DeGroot
- Grandfathers: Geoff Webb
- Grandmothers: Avril Webb
- Uncles: Pete Sutherland
- Aunts: Kerry Webb
- Nephews: Oliver Phillips
- First cousins: Max Sutherland

Danielle "Dani" Sutherland is a fictional character from the Australian soap opera Home and Away, played by Tammin Sursok. The actress successfully auditioned for the role of Dani in 1999 and she called the experience incredible. Sursok considered herself lucky to get the part, as the audition was the first one she had had since acquiring an agent. She made her first screen appearance as Dani during the episode broadcast on 19 June 2000. After four years in the role, Sursok made the decision to leave Home and Away in 2004 to pursue a music career and other acting opportunities and as a result Dani departed the series on 12 November 2004. She later explained that she had also become frustrated with the serial's producers. Sursok was glad that her character was written out of the show without anything bad happening to her.

Dani was introduced to Home and Away along with her family, who came to Summer Bay to take over the running of the local caravan park. Dani was initially against moving to the Bay as she thought the town was "tame". The character was described as being strong, independent and a bit of a rebel by a writer for the show's official website. She was also confident and high spirited. Dani developed relationships with three of the serial's male characters; Will Smith (Zac Drayson), Josh West (Daniel Collopy) and Scott Hunter (Kip Gamblin). Dani's first major storyline occurred in 2001, when she was raped by Kane Phillips (Sam Atwell). Sursok called the assault the worst thing that had ever happened to her character. Dani later hit Kane with her car and was sent to prison after being found guilty of attempted murder. In her later storylines, Dani was harassed by two stalkers. Sursok won the Most Popular New Female Talent Logie Award in 2001 for her portrayal of Dani.

== Casting ==
After acquiring an agent when she was fourteen, Sursok's first audition was for a role in Home and Away in 1999. Sursok received the role of Dani, the eldest daughter of the Sutherland family, who took over the running of the Caravan Park. The actress considered herself lucky to get the part, calling the experience "incredible". She told a writer for TeenHollywood, "It was my first audition, so I thought it always worked like that, and you always get your first audition, but that is not the case."

Sursok left Home and Away in 2004, so she could pursue a music career and acting opportunities in the United States. The actress explained "I'm 21 and it's time to be more creative. It is scary, but I had to leave before I became stale." Sursok later revealed that her frustration with the soap's producers also contributed to her exit. When asked if she was happy with how she was written out of Home and Away, Sursok stated that she wanted "something completely dramatic", but she was glad that nothing bad happened to her character, so she could always return to the show.

== Development ==
=== Characterisation ===
"Strong, independent and the oldest of the Sutherland kids, Dani has always been in a hurry to grow up."

— A writer for the official Home and Away website on Dani (2004)

Dani arrives in Summer Bay from the city with her parents Rhys (Michael Beckley) and Shelley (Paula Forrest), and her sisters Kirsty (Christie Hayes) and Jade (Kate Garven). Dani does not want to be there and wishes she was back in the city, as she was forced to leave her older boyfriend behind when her family moved. She was not happy about living in the Bay, which she thought was "tame", and became convinced that her parents just wanted to keep her apart from her boyfriend. Dani is "quite vocal" and makes her family's lives miserable. A writer for the official Home and Away website said Dani "missed the excitement of sneaking into a pub for a night out with her girlfriends."

The writer also commented that Dani just wanted to "turn 18, finish school and move out of home." When Dani learned that her mother had returned to work, despite promising not to, she rang her boyfriend to beg him to take her away. Dani was later forced to take on the responsibility of looking after her younger sisters when her parents began to work long hours. She started to resent Shelley's job as a social worker and began to revolt. Dani was described as being "a bit of a rebel without a cause." Sursok proclaimed that unlike Dani, she is "a very positive person who considers life a journey." A writer for the Home and Away: Official collectors edition magazine noted that Dani was always confident and "high spirited", but she was "broken" after she was attacked.

=== Relationships ===
Dani's first relationship was with Will Smith (Zac Drayson). The writers used the young couple to explore the subject of taking a relationship to a physical level. The character were seen on-screen discussing sex. However, "all hell breaks loose" when Dani learned that Will was hoping to have sex with her after the school formal. Sursok explained that when her character saw a condom fall out of Will's wallet, she was horrified, especially as her father was there too. The actress continued, "The sad thing is even though Will is a bit ahead of himself, he's actually doing the responsible thing by carrying a condom. But Dani doesn't see it that way." Dani made the decision not to speak to Will and refuses to go to the formal, thinking that everything is "ruined". Will tried to win Dani back when she decided to go to the formal after all and succeed. Will later got Gypsy Nash (Kimberley Cooper) pregnant during "a brief fling", while he and Dani were going through a rough patch in their relationship. Kilmeny Adie from the Illawarra Mercury believed that Dani never quite got over Will and her feelings were "not made easier" when she learned that Will and Gypsy had got engaged soon after the birth of their daughter.

In November 2001, Josh West (Daniel Collopy) was introduced to the serial and became a love interest for Dani. Dani and Josh began dating, but their relationship was filled with "ups and downs". The couple briefly broke up and Sursok noted that the relationship had come down to "silly mind games and petty arguments." Dani and Josh realised that they had overcome many problems and dramas, but instead of being there for each other and appreciating what they had, they "lost sight of why they are together". Following another argument, Dani spoke to Hayley Smith (Rebecca Cartwright) about their problems and decided that she and Josh needed to stop being silly and talk through their issues. After an "honest and emotional discussion", the couple realised that what they had was special and called a truce to their arguments.

After her relationship with Josh ended, Dani began dating Scott Hunter (Kip Gamblin). She first met Scott on the beach, where he was riding his horse. Two weeks later, they met again and Alf Stewart (Ray Meagher) informed Dani that Scott had invested in the boat shed and was trying to escape city life. Dani soon landed a date with Scott and was "instantly swept away by his charms." The arrival of Scott's young sister, Kit (Amy Mizzi), caused problems between Scott and Dani as they contended with her alcoholism. Dani was dismayed when her father invited Kit to move into his home, on the condition that she stop drinking. Gamblin told Jason Herbison from Inside Soap, "Scott is happy because he thinks it will help her, but it really complicates things for him and Dani. Their relationship is going well and the Sutherlands like him, but now Kit could mess it up." Dani and Scott later became engaged and stayed together until Dani's departure in 2004.

=== Sexual assault ===
Dani finds herself drawn to the rebellious Kane Phillips (Sam Atwell) even though everyone knows he is "bad news". Sursok commented that there is something about him that fascinates Dani and she is also aware that he comes from a troubled background, but blames his brother for his behaviour. Dani and her boyfriend Will Smith start having problems in their relationship and Dani begins flirting with Kane, eventually kissing him. She feels guilty afterwards and tries to get Kane out of her head. Sursok told Inside Soap's Jason Herbison "After Dani kisses Kane, she knows it's wrong and decides not to take it any further. The problem is, Kane really wants Dani, and he won't take no for an answer." One day, Kane helps Dani carry some shopping home and he comes on to her. When Dani tries to stop him, Kane pins her down and sexually assaults her. Describing the scenes, Sursok stated "She tries to resist, but he gets violent and forces her. You don't see what happens next, but you get the idea." The actress explained that the censorship laws in Australia stopped producers from using the word "rape", but viewers will be left in no doubt that Dani was the victim of a serious crime. Sursok told Herbison that the assault is the worst thing that has ever happened to Dani and she feels that she is somehow to blame because she did come on to Kane.

Sursok admitted that she had trouble sleeping while the episodes were being filmed and the thought of being in Dani's shoes was all it took for her to give a convincing performance. The actress called the storyline "very important" and commented that children have to know that that kind of behaviour was not acceptable. Sursok later became frustrated with the producers after the scenes involving Dani's attack were cut. Sursok said "For me as an actor the rape storyline was really good, but unfortunately they ended up cutting everything and we had to re-shoot the whole thing because it was too emotional and too intense." The actress admitted that was the moment she thought the show was not realistic as the storyline went from being a rape to an attack. Sursok added that it was quite hard for her as the scenes had been some of her best and she had received many letters from viewers telling her she had helped them. Dani later learned that her sister, Kirsty, had begun a relationship with Kane and was horrified by her betrayal. Kirsty insisted that Kane was her soulmate, while a "furious" Dani threatened to break them up.

=== Prison ===
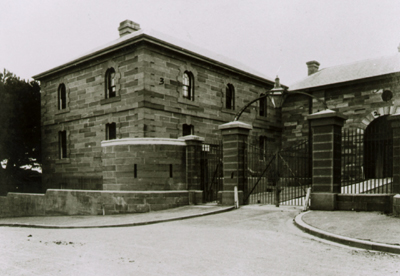
Maitland Gaol in New South Wales served as the prison in which Dani was incarcerated for hitting Kane with her car. Sursok said her experience inside Maitland was "quite realistic".

Dani later injures Kane after she hits him with her car and she is sent to prison when she is found guilty of attempted murder. The storyline unfolded through a series of flashbacks. The episode begins in the present and then goes through time to reveal what happened in the previous twenty-four hours. Sursok revealed that she was "really excited" when she got the scripts and that she had gone to the scriptwriters a few months earlier and asked for her character to be given some big storylines. Sursok explained that the first thing viewers see is Dani behind the wheel of her car, wiping tears from her eyes. It is obvious Dani is upset about something, but it is not clear what about. She then hears a loud bang, which sounds like she has run something over. Dani gets out and when she sees blood, she assumes she has hit a kangaroo. Dani panics when she sees headlights coming towards her and she gets back in the car and leaves the scene.

The episode then goes back to the previous day where Dani's boyfriend, Scott, is seen punching Kane as he believes he is taking advantage of Kirsty. Sursok stated "It ends in this huge argument, and Dani and Kirsty are at loggerheads. Dani simply can't take much more. After that, Scott tries to comfort Dani and suggests that she might need professional help to get through this. And that's what tips Dani over the edge - she feels like Scott is suggesting she has a problem when, in fact, it's all Kane's fault." Dani becomes distressed and gets into her car and drives straight to her "sleazy" university lecturer, Ross McLuhan (Angelo D'Angelo), because she knows that he will tell her what she wants to hear. Sursok told Herbison that Dani is not thinking straight and wants to run away from her problems. As he is comforting her, Ross kisses Dani and she responds. However, she realises that it is wrong and that is when she gets back in the car and drives off.

The episode then returns to where it started, but this time viewers see that Dani has hit Kane with her car. Noah Lawson (Beau Brady) finds an unconscious Kane by the side of the road and Dani is soon under suspicion of attempted murder. She tells Kirsty that she thinks she ran over a kangaroo, but then her father reveals that Kane was hit by a car and is in the hospital. Sursok added "People can't help but wonder is she did it on purpose - and that includes her father and Scott. Dani is shocked that people could even think that. She would never try to kill anyone - but how can she convince them?" Dani is arrested and ends up in court charged with attempted murder, where she is found guilty and sent to prison. Maitland Gaol served as the prison that Dani was sent to. Scenes involving Maitland were shot in September 2003. On Dani's experience inside, Linda Barnier and Andrew Waugh from The Newcastle Herald stated "Dani adopts a tough persona to survive her first day in the Big House. But it's just a ruse the real Dani's just a scared little girl."

Dani initially finds herself being bullied by Viv "The Guv" Standish (Maggie Kirkpatrick) inside. However, she eventually earns Viv's respect. Viv takes Dani under her wing and even offers to help with her appeal. Sursok enjoyed the changed of pace for Dani, who had started to become "one of the more solid, dependable characters." The actress told The Sun-Herald's Scott Ellis "I said [to the producers] I know I've been established with all my storylines, but I really want to be able to push myself and really work with something ... they said 'OK, well you're going to jail'. I asked for something new and I definitely got it." Dani is later released from prison, but Tricia Martin and Sarah Ellis from Inside Soap commented that she should have stayed inside because then viewers would have been spared the first Summer Bay stalker, Felix Walters (Josh Lawson).

=== Stalkers ===
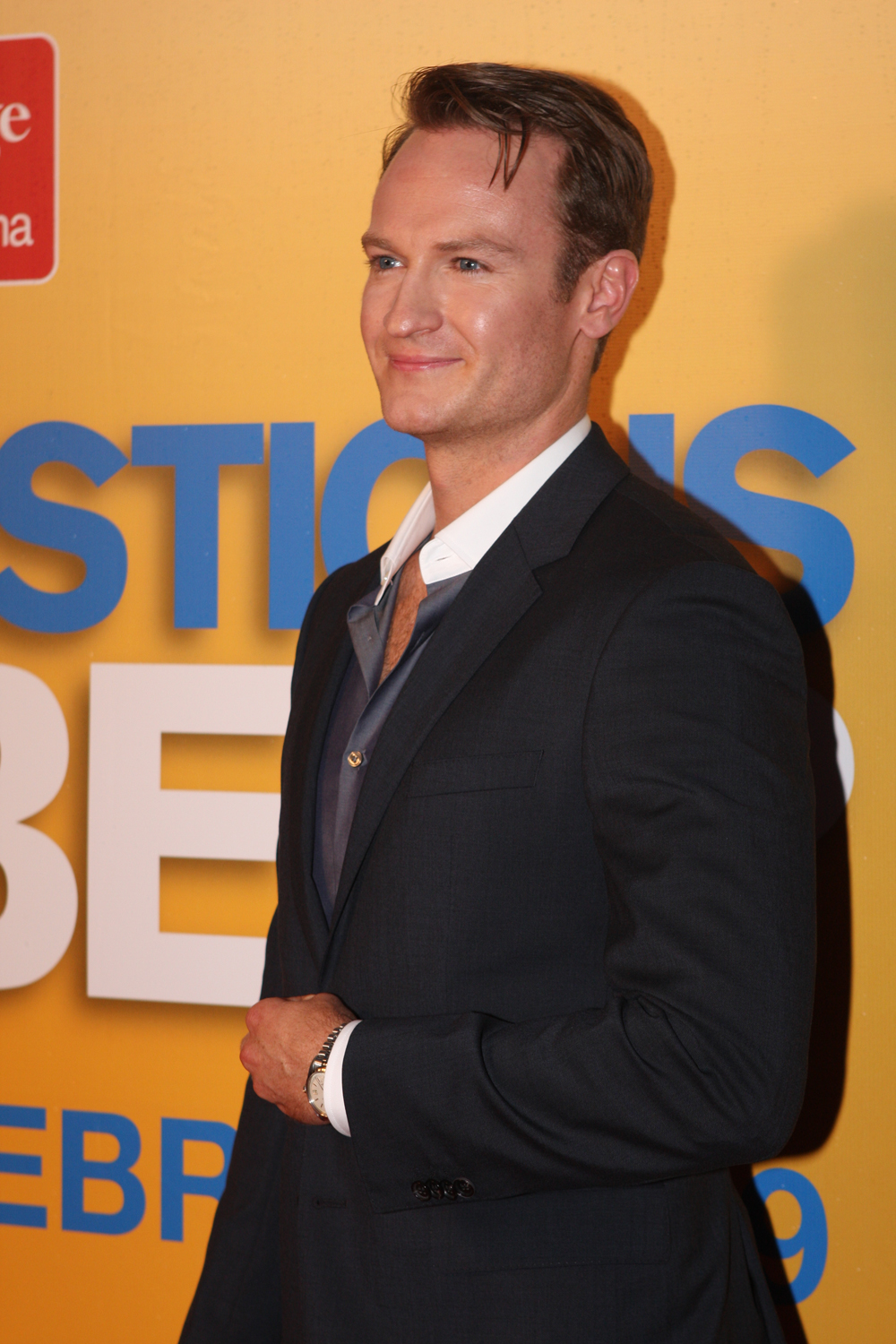
Josh Lawson portrayed Dani's stalker, Felix Walters.

Felix stalked Dani and she struggled to cope with his constant harassment. When Dani went to confront her stalker at the university, she became aware of someone following her and she lashed out at her potential assailant. However, she soon discovered that she had accidentally attacked The Dean (Philip Holder). Felix was beaten up and he died in hospital. When Dani received a letter from Maitland Prison, she became convinced she knew who had committed the crime. Dani realised that she would have to return to the prison, where she was incarcerated for a time, to meet with the letter writer. Sursok told a TV Week reporter, "She thinks she has to sort it out. She goes back to the prison even though she doesn't want to. It brings up a lot of bad memories. But she has to go there and figure it out for herself." The author of the letter and the person who ordered the attack of Felix turned out to be Viv. Dani then realised that she may be an accessory to Felix's murder.

It was later revealed that Felix was administered a fatal dose of crystal meth by his girlfriend and accomplice, Sarah Lewis (Luisa Hastings-Edge). However, Sarah blamed Dani and Scott for Felix's death. She then began stalking and victimising them and some of their friends. Sarah set Dani up to have her hands burned by toxic chemicals, which left her with "a really fragile frame of mind." Sarah's victims later came together to try and ensure that she was sent to prison, instead of a mental hospital where she could be freed early. Sarah invited her victims to a counselling session and Detective Peter Baker (Nicholas Bishop) suggested that they try and provoke her into confessing to her crimes. Sursok called the situation "particularly traumatic" for Dani. When Sarah escaped from her psychiatric institution, she returned to the Bay to get revenge for Felix. Dani tried to get to a safe house, but Sarah got to her first and kidnapped her. Sarah then shot and killed Noah, before turning the gun on herself.

== Storylines ==
Dani, her mother, father and two younger sisters move to Summer Bay to take over the running of the local caravan park. Dani is initially unhappy about having to move from the city to the Bay and she later calls her boyfriend, Kel (Ben Tate), to come and take her away. Kel eventually shows up and Dani tries to talk to him about their future. Kel turns nasty and Will Smith comes to Dani's rescue. Dani complains when her mother gets involved in social work, saying that she is putting her career before the family. Dani also become fed up with her sisters not helping out enough. Dani befriends Will and they later begin dating. Dani also becomes close friends with Brodie Hanson (Susie Rugg), who her parents foster. Dani and Will's relationship hits a rough patch when Dani becomes jealous of Will's friendship with Gypsy Nash. Dani flirts with Kane Philips and kisses him, but immediately regrets it. When Kane helps Dani carry some shopping home, he comes on to her and she rejects him. But Kane does not take no for an answer and he rapes her. Brodie finds a shocked Dani and calls her parents home. Dani presses charges against Kane and the case goes to court. Will gives evidence and Kane is found not guilty, which devastates Dani.

Will and Dani try to make their relationship work, even after Gypsy reveals she is pregnant with Will's child, but they eventually break up. Dani is later saddened to learn that Will and Gypsy are engaged. Dani becomes good friends with Josh West and they begin a relationship. Dani and Josh start arguing and later break up. While on the beach one day, Dani spots Scott Hunter riding on a white horse and they are immediately attracted to each other. A couple of weeks later, Dani meets Scott again and they go out on a date. They begin a relationship, but it is tested by the arrival of Scott's alcoholic sister, Kit, and Kane's return to the Bay. Dani refuses to accept that Kane is a changed man and she is devastated when she learns that her sister, Kirsty, is dating him. Dani then tries break the couple up and she and Kirsty argue a lot. When Scott suggests that Dani seeks professional help, Dani becomes upset and goes to see her university lecturer, Ross McLuhan. While Ross comforts Dani, they kiss. Dani becomes upset and gets in her car and leaves. On her way home, Dani hits something. She initially thinks it is an animal and leaves the scene. However, she soon learns that she hit Kane.

Dani is arrested and later found guilty of attempted murder. She is sent to jail, where she is bullied by inmate, Viv "The Guv" Standish. Eventually Dani gains The Guv's respect and they become friends, even staying in touch when Dani is released. Dani continues with her mission to break Kane and Kirsty up, but fails. However, when Kane helps to rescue her family from a mine shaft and saves several people from a fire, Dani starts to forgive him and accept his relationship with her sister. When Dani criticises Felix Walters in an article published in the university newspaper, he starts stalking her. Felix also gets his girlfriend, Sarah Lewis, to dress as a police woman and tell Dani that Scott has died. Dani tries to confront Felix at the university, but ends up assaulting the dean by mistake. When Felix is attacked and winds up in hospital, Dani comes under suspicion. Felix later dies and Dani learns from Viv that she ordered the attack on Felix. It is revealed that Felix actually died from a fatal dose of crystal meth given to him by Sarah. Sarah's fragile state of mind causes her to blame Dani and her friends for Felix's death and she starts terrorising them. After shooting Jesse McGregor (Ben Unwin), Sarah is caught and taken to a psychiatric institution.

Sarah later escapes the psychiatric institution and return to get revenge for Felix. When Dani and Scott learn of Sarah's escape, they decide to flee to Paris. However, they forget their passports and return to their house to get them. Sarah surprises them and she ties up Dani, before getting Scott to take her to where the others are hiding. Dani manages to catch the attention of her father and the police, who are outside the house and they free her. She drives to the safe house, where her friends are hiding, to stop Sarah. Upon her arrival, Sarah shoots Noah dead, before turning the gun on herself. Scott proposes to Dani and she accepts. When Viv tells Dani that she is dying, she asks her to write her memoirs. Dani agrees, but the gesture causes problems with Scott. He starts to believe that Dani is having an affair with Stafford McRae (Rohan Nichol), a representative from a publishing company. Stafford accompanies Dani to Viv's funeral in the city and comforts her afterwards. He also admits that he is attracted to her and feels that she should not settle down in the Bay with Scott. Dani realises that she and Scott want different things and they break up. Dani then leaves the Bay.

== In other media ==
In 2003, two DVDs entitled Home and Away: Secrets and the City and Home and Away: Hearts Divided were released. Secrets and the City was hosted by Sursok and the DVD featured three episodes, one that was not shown on television, behind the scenes footage, interviews and tracks from the Home and Away Hits CD. The episodes focused on Dani and Josh's journey to Sydney, where they tried to track down Dani's father. Dani and Josh meet Hayley and Noah who have gone away for a romantic weekend. Hearts Divided was hosted by Bec Hewitt and like Secrets and the City, it featured an episode that was not shown on television, taking viewers "beyond the storyline." There was also behind the scenes footage, a music video and a featurette involving Hewitt and Beau Brady. The story focused on the Sutherland family and the return of Dani's attacker Kane Phillips.

The following year Home & Away and Pan Macmillan released two books focussing on the period of Dani's trial for nearly killing Kane. Dani on Trial and Prisoner No. 2549971 gave a different insight, from what played out on screen, into the characters and their motivations.

== Reception ==
For her portrayal of Dani, Sursok won the Logie Award for Most Popular New Female Talent in 2001. Three years later, she was nominated for the Most Popular Actress Logie. Herald Sun critic Jackie Brygel branded Dani "The Whiny Blonde" in her soap opera column. Linda Barnier of the Newcastle Herald branded Dani "unlucky-in-love", while The Sydney Morning Herald's Robin Oliver called her "a go-getter". A writer for the Home and Away: Official collectors edition magazine called Dani's assault at the hands of Kane "harrowing". They added that the ordeal and her time in prison was something that she never really got over. Andrew Mercado revealed that viewers complained to TV Week about the producers putting "poor Dani" in prison. Mercado also called the Sutherland family "the most tortured lot in the history of the soap." Channel 5 chose the episode in which Sarah returned to the Bay and Dani and Scott tried to flee her as one of their "Best Cliffhangers".
