= Rhys Sutherland =

- Home and Away character
- Portrayed by: Michael Beckley
- Duration: 2000–2004
- First appearance: 19 June 2000
- Last appearance: 28 September 2004
- Introduced by: John Holmes
- Book appearances: Dani on Trial
In-universe information
- Occupation: AFL player Caravan Park Owner; Surf Club Kiosk Owner; Foster parent
- Father: John Sutherland
- Brothers: Pete Sutherland
- Wife: Shelley Sutherland (1982–2003, 2005–); Beth Hunter (2004–05)
- Daughters: Dani Sutherland; Kirsty Sutherland; Laura DeGroot
- Adoptive daughters: Jade Sutherland
- Stepsons: Scott Hunter; Robbie Hunter; Henry Hunter
- Stepdaughters: Kit Hunter; Matilda Hunter
- Grandsons: Oliver Philips
- Nephews: Max Sutherland

Rhys Sutherland is a fictional character from the Australian soap opera Home and Away, portrayed by actor Michael Beckley from 2000 to late 2004.

== Development ==
In June 2000, producers introduced the five-strong Sutherland family to take over the Summer Bay Caravan Park. Michael Beckley was cast as patriarch Rhys Sutherland. He had spent twenty years as a theatre actor before he joined Home and Away. He told Joanne McCarthy of the Newcastle Herald that he approached his agent about finding a television role as he wanted "some stability". He joked that he "basically fell into Home and Away" and was grateful that he did. The Sutherland family is headed up by Rhys, who was billed as a former football player with "a habit of losing his temper", and his wife Shelley (Paula Forrest), who is always prepared to step in and "smooth things over." They have three teenage daughters; Dani Sutherland (Tammin Sursok), Jade Sutherland (Kate Garven), and Kirsty Sutherland (Christie Hayes). Beckley believed the best thing about the Sutherlands was that they were not connected to any of the show's established characters, explaining "I think they will open up all sorts of possibilities for the show. Because they don't know anybody else, these characters could go in so many different directions."

Beckley described Summer Bay as a "deadly little place" and said "You've really got to watch your step. And, of course, no one does. We've often joked that you'd only survive living in Summer Bay for about three hours if it actually existed." Talking about production, Beckley said "You do try to be a one-take wonder because we don't have a lot of resources. You've got to grab the stuff and make it work, but that's what being a professional is about. I think people would be surprised, but we don't have a lot of out-takes where people fall about laughing. I can think of only one time in four years when that's happened. The rest of the time if you make a mistake you say, 'Oops, sorry', and you do it again and get it right."

The character's fictional backstory come to the forefront with the introduction of his former girlfriend Angie Russell (Laurie Foell). Of their relationship, Beckley explained "Angie was the first love of Rhys' life, and they dated for the last couple of years of high school. Rhys left Angie when he met Shelley, and as far as Shelley believes, Rhys has never seen Angie since. But as we find out, that's not been the case." Angie becomes vice principal of Summer Bay High and leaves Rhys "understandably nervous" when she assures him that their secret will never be revealed. Beckley told Jason Herbison of Inside Soap that Rhys starts to question Angie's motives when they both end up at the wrong venue for his 40th birthday party. He revealed that Angie makes sure Rhys does not get the message about the venue change, and then makes romantic advances towards him. Beckley stated "Warning bells go off for Rhys, but not too loudly, and he laughs it off and insists they join the others." He continued explaining that when Rhys and Angie arrives at the party together, Shelley is not impressed and Angie "takes great delight" in winding her up. Rhys finds the situation uncomfortable, but he does not know what to do.

Rhys also "turns a blind eye" when he learns Angie has a sixteen-year-old son, Dylan Russell (Brett Hicks-Maitland), and Beckley called him "a bit dim". He said if Rhys thought about it, he would realise that Dylan could be his son, but he is in denial. Rhys fails to spot his daughter Kirsty is establishing a romance with Dylan and has to have it pointed out to him by Shelley. Even after he orders Kirsty to stay away from Dylan, he still does not put two and two together. Beckley told Herbison: "Angie eventually says to him 'Don't you get it? Dylan's your son. Rhys is shocked, of course, but he also feels responsible for this kid." Beckley felt his character was stuck "between a rock and a hard place" because he has to tell his family about Dylan, but he knows they will react badly. He tries to put it off, but later finds Angie and Shelley talking and realises Angie has told his wife everything. Beckley described it as "an awful moment" for Rhys, but Angie enjoys watching him squirm. The storyline eventually impacts everyone in the Bay and Beckley said it was great for him as an actor, as every day felt like a roller coaster with one revelation after another.

One of the character's final storylines resulted in the demise of his marriage to Beth Hunter (Clarissa House). The couple experience various marital problems, which leads them to see a counsellor. Rhys also begins spending time with his former wife Shelley, following her return. Eventually Rhys makes "a shock decision" to leave Beth, as he is still in love with Shelley, and he feels that he is living a lie. Beckley said the scene in which Beth asks Rhys to leave the house was "quite harrowing to film" for him. He stated: "It doesn't happen with shouting and screaming. It's all very calm and controlled, which, funnily enough, can make it a lot harder."

== Storylines ==
Rhys, his wife Shelley and their three teenage daughters Dani, Kirsty and Jade relocate to Summer Bay after purchasing Summer Bay House and the adjoining Caravan Park from Pippa Ross (Debra Lawrence). Rhys takes over the running of the surf club kiosk. When Shelley brings home Brodie Hanson (Susie Rugg) from the local drop-in centre, Rhys has reservations at first but they foster her.

Rhys is enraged when he learns Dani has been raped by Kane Phillips (Sam Atwell) and this causes friction within the family. Matters are made worse when Kane is found not guilty and Rhys tries to drive him out of town. Kane eventually leaves of his own accord. Rhys' brother, Pete (Christopher Mayer) and his son Max (Sebastian Elmaloglou), arrive for a visit. It soon becomes apparent that Pete is on the run facing gambling debts and he flees leaving Max in Rhys and Shelley's care.

Kirsty's rebellion begins to test Rhy's patience and matters are not helped when she begins seeing Kane, who had saved her and Shelley's lives on a cruise. Rhys forces Kirsty to choose between the family and Kane. Kirsty initially choose's the family but runs away with Kane for a while. Kane eventually dumps Kirsty leaving her to return to the family.

Angie Russell (Foell), a former flame of Rhys, arrives in the bay for their 40th birthday and causes havoc by alleging that Rhys is the father of her son, Dylan (Hicks-Maitland). This news threatens to tear the Sutherland's apart. It's later revealed to the shock of Angie and the Sutherlands, that Rhys is not Dylan's father but the damage to Rhys and Shelley's marriage is done and Shelley moves to the city, leaving Rhys and the girls Heartbroken. Kane later returns and gets back together with Kirsty provoking Rhys' anger even further. Dani is later jailed for running over Kane and Rhys struggles to forgive Kirsty for siding with Kane over her sister.

Rhys begins a new relationship with Beth Hunter (Clarissa House) and they later become engaged despite the arguments between their respective broods. On Rhys and Beth's wedding day, everybody is present except for Kirsty who has eloped with Kane. After Dani slowly warms to Kane, Rhys drops his hostilities with Kane. After Kirsty is diagnosed with a kidney problem and miscarries, Shelley returns to donate her kidney. The Sutherlands later discover Jade was switched at birth with another baby, Laura DeGroot (also played by Hayes). Shelley and Rhys began to spend a great deal of time together and eventually fall in love again. Rhys breaks Beth's heart and reunites with Shelley in the city and they remarry a year later.

== Reception ==
Sacha Molitorisz of The Sydney Morning Herald said that the episode featuring Rhys and Beth's wedding was better suited to "die hard fans". They criticised the plot for being "unengaging" and opined that the music, performances and dialogue were "painful" and "patchy".
