= Alex Blias =

Australian actor

Alex Blias is an Australian actor, who has appeared in television, film and theatre roles. His film career began in Australia. He was selected for a supporting role in the 1998 film Spank!. Later, he played roles in television and theatre. In 2005 and 2006, he performed at the Melbourne International Comedy Festival and Cracker Comedy Festival.

== Television credits ==
- Home and Away as Chris Poulos, brother of Leah Poulos
- Always Greener as "Skid" Mark Pannas
- All Saints as Jack

== Film credits ==
- Spank! (1999)
- Get Rich Quick (2004)

== Theatre credits ==
- It's a Mother
- It's a Father
