= Kirsty Sutherland =

- Home and Away character
- Portrayed by: Christie Hayes
- Duration: 2000–2005, 2008–2009
- First appearance: 19 June 2000
- Last appearance: 28 October 2009
- Book appearances: Hearts Divided; Dani on Trial; Second Chances
- Spin-off appearances: Home and Away: Secrets and the City; Home and Away: Hearts Divided
In-universe information
- Other names: Kirsty Phillips
- Occupation: Student (2000–04); Kiosk worker Hairdresser (2001); Waitress (2008); Escort (2008); Administrative Assistant (2008–09)
- Father: Rhys Sutherland
- Mother: Shelley Sutherland
- Stepmother: Beth Hunter
- Brothers: Scott Hunter (step); Robbie Hunter (step); Henry Hunter (step)
- Sisters: Dani Sutherland; Jade Sutherland(adoptive); Laura DeGroot; Kit Hunter(step); Matilda Hunter (step)
- Husband: Kane Phillips (2004–09)
- Sons: Oliver Phillips
- Grandfathers: John Sutherland; Geoff Webb
- Grandmothers: Avril Webb
- Uncles: Pete Sutherland
- Aunts: Kerry Webb
- First cousins: Max Sutherland

Kirsty Sutherland (also Phillips) is a fictional character from the Australian Channel Seven soap opera Home and Away, played by Christie Hayes between 2000 and 2005 and again from 2008 to 2009. Kirsty first appeared on-screen during the episode airing on 19 June 2000 and has been involved in one of the serial's most controversial storylines in which she knowingly started a relationship with a man who sexually assaulted her sister. Other notable plots include a baby swap plot, two miscarriages and a string of relationships including one with her supposed half-brother. Actress Hayes began playing the role at age thirteen and has quit the serial on two occasions, she made her original departure on 23 February 2005.

== Casting ==
Actress Christie Hayes auditioned for the role when she was thirteen years old and secured it. In 2008 it was revealed that Hayes was returning to the serial and likened it to returning home when she stated: "It felt like coming home after I had moved out already, everything changed but was really still the same, it was refreshing and exciting."

In 2009, Hayes decided to leave the serial again and filmed her final scenes in August. She cited that the time felt right, but added she was happy she had come back for the time she had. Hayes later said that she is not planning to return in the future, but will not completely rule it out.

== Character development ==
=== Characterisation ===
On the subject of Kirsty's personality changes during her time away from Summer Bay, Hayes stated: "As a mum, she has become protective of her kids around her, but is still trying to figure herself out." Speaking of Kirsty overall development after Hayes finished filming, she stated: "I like how the character's been resolved and the way she's grown up - she was a little girl when she first arrived and now she's not only divorced but even had a storyline where she needed money and started working as an escort!"

=== Relationship with Kane Phillips ===
Kirsty's relationship with Kane Phillips (Sam Atwell) proved to be one of the serial's most controversial storylines in its history. The controversy stemmed from a previous storyline in which Kane sexually assaulted her sister Dani Sutherland (Tammin Sursok), knowing this Kirsty pursues Kane. Atwell later departed and the storyline was phased out until the revelation that the storyline had actually proved so popular with viewers that producers brought back Atwell's character to resume their relationship. Producer's decided to capitalise on the pairing's popularity by making a tie in Book, CD and a DVD titled Home and Away: Hearts Divided.

=== Exit ===
Kirsty's exit storyline aired in 2009. One of her final storylines is her miscarriage and subsequent breakdown of her relationship with Miles Copeland (Josh Quong Tart) which leads her to run away from Summer Bay without telling him. This was out of character for Kirsty to not tell Miles, Hayes branded the exit as selfish and during an interview why she did it, stating: "It's horrible! It's so selfish but I forgive it because I see Kirsty in her right mind wouldn't have actually done that. She's emotionally detached and I think she thought at the time she was doing the best thing [...] She thinks that if she talked about it with Miles, he'd try and talk her out of it and she might stay and then they'd be stuck going back and forth." However Hayes still disapproved of the way it was handled stating: "I don't agree with what she did or how she did it but Kirsty in her warped, grieving mind thinks it's best for everybody." Paula Forrest also returned as her on-screen mother Shelley Sutherland for her departure, Hayes was delighted by this and stated: "That was fantastic! We both know our characters back to front and, even though she hasn't played Shelley for a very long time, it was like no time had passed at all. Leaving Home and Away was really an emotional time for me, so I loved having a mother figure there." Hayes also praised her exit storyline citing it as realistic to just leave without being killed off or being part of a dramatic illness plot.

== Storylines ==
Kirsty arrives with the rest of her family and take over the caravan park. She has a short romance with Nick Smith (Chris Egan), but she dumps him already after a week when she has feelings for someone else. She has also dated Seb Miller (Mitch Firth). She later falls in love with Dylan Russell (Brett Hicks-Maitland), they begin a relationship but his mother Angie (Laurie Foell) claims he is fathered by Rhys Sutherland (Michael Beckley) meaning they are siblings. Disgusted they break things off, many months later it's revealed that Angie lied. She later falls in love with Kane even though he raped her sister Dani. This leaves Dani devastated and she tries to break them up on a number of occasions. Kirsty pretends that she is pregnant and keep the lie up for a while, unable to cover it up she then pretends to miscarry. Kirsty then shockingly discovers she is actually pregnant for real, she then has to tell everyone the news, after a few weeks in an ironic turn of events she miscarries for real. Dani accidentally runs Kane over and is later imprisoned. Kirsty also believes she did it on purpose. Everyone comes to accept her relationship in the end when they realise Kane has changed.

Kirsty and other members of her family later get trapped down a mine shaft, she and Jade Sutherland (Kate Garven) use their twin psychic powers to contact each other and get out alive. She later finds out her real twin isn't Jade after there was a mix up at birth and Laura DeGroot (also played by Hayes) is her real twin sister. Kirsty later flees Summer Bay with Kane for a life on the run after Kane is framed for armed robbery. Kirsty is also pregnant. Three years later, they return with the help of Irene Roberts (Lynne McGranger). Kane goes to prison after he blows the prom dance up. After he is released, Kirsty realizes she doesn't love Kane anymore and the couple split up and he leaves. Kirsty starts working at the Diner, then she gets a job at the school where she falls for Miles Copeland and they begin a relationship. Martin Bartlett (Bob Baines), the headmaster then develops feelings for Kirsty and starts sexually harassing her. He threatens to fire her for not responding to his advances, when that doesn't work he sacks Miles instead. Kirsty becomes pregnant, then miscarries. She and Miles break up but later try to patch things up. Kirsty's mother Shelley returns to support her and convinces her to move back to the City with her. Kirsty leaves with her son Ollie (Oliver Davis) without telling Miles.

== Reception ==
The Armidale Express commented on Kirsty's relationship with Kane stating: "The Romeo and Juliet love story between Kane and love interest Kirsty (played by Christie Hayes) still remains one of the greatest (if not most controversial) Home And Away love stories." Soap opera coverage website Holy Soap branded her final episode as a real tear jerker. Holy soap also brand her wedding to Kane as "bizarre" because of the double wedding and stated "it's little wonder" that the pair had a private wedding.
