= Stephanie Jacobsen =

Australian actress

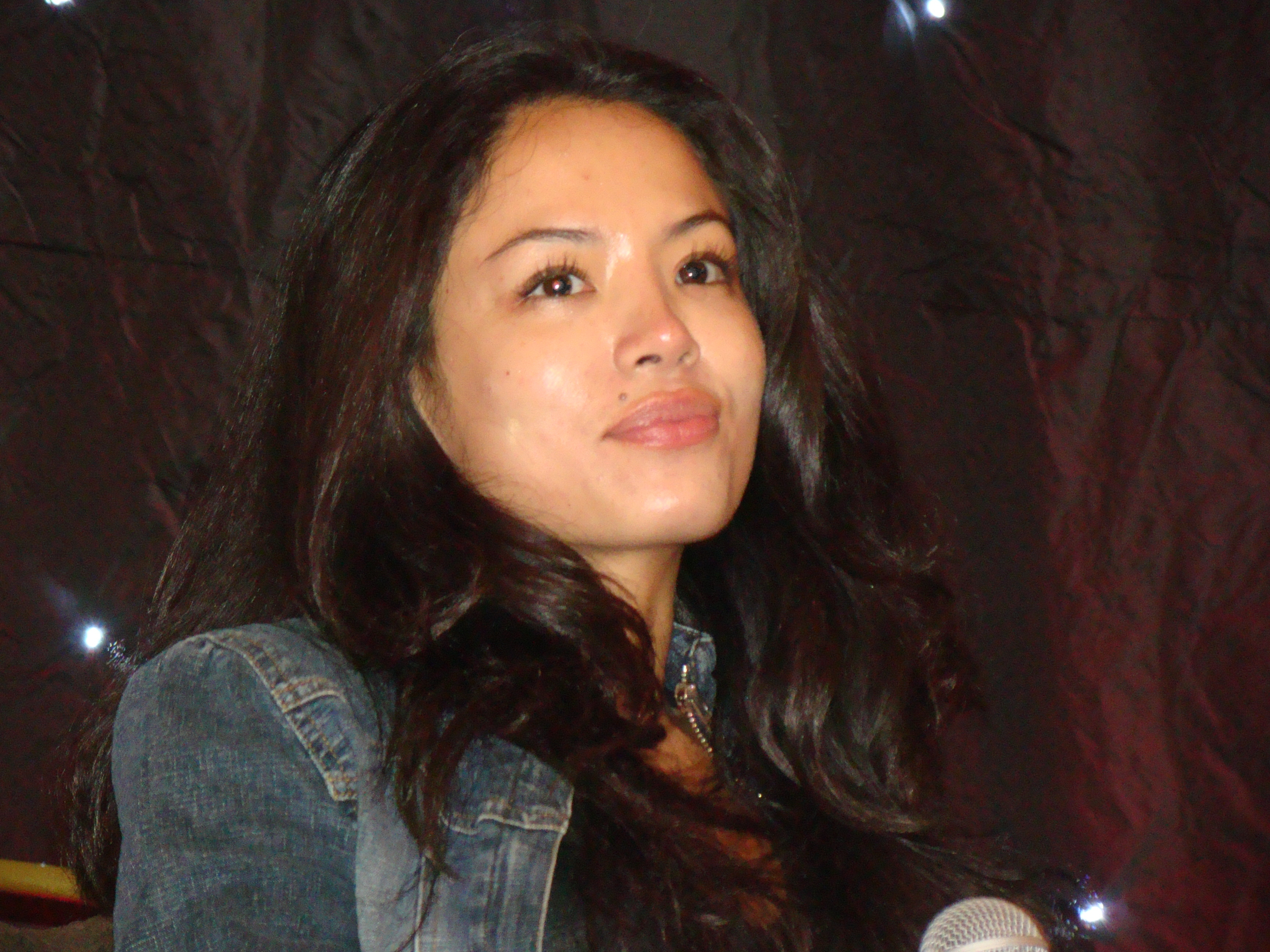
- Jacobsen in 2011
- Born: Stephanie Chaves-Jacobsen; 22 June 1980 (age 46); British Hong Kong
- Occupation: Actress
- Years active: 2000–present

Stephanie Chaves-Jacobsen (born 1980), is a Hong Kong-born Australian actress.

== Early life and education ==
Jacobsen was born in British Hong Kong. Her family moved to Australia when she was twelve years old.

She is of Chinese, Portuguese, Norwegian and English descent.

She attended the University of Sydney, from which she graduated with a double-major Bachelor of Arts in English literature and philosophy.

== Career ==
Jacobsen began her career in the SBS comedy series Pizza. She later appeared in the Australian soap opera Home and Away, playing Charlotte Adams from 2001 to 2002, and in the Australian science fiction series Farscape, as well as a number of TV commercials.

In 2007, Jacobsen landed the role of Kendra Shaw in Battlestar Galactica: Razor, a between-seasons television film of the re-imagined Battlestar Galactica television series. She also played Sam Tyler's future girlfriend in the original pilot of the American television show Life on Mars.

In 2008, she was cast on the Fox series Terminator: The Sarah Connor Chronicles, playing Jesse, a Resistance fighter and girlfriend of Derek Reese. She also played Yoshi in The Devil's Tomb.

In April 2009, Jacobsen was cast on The CW's revamped Melrose Place in the role of medical student Lauren Yung.

In 2010, she acted in the science fiction film Quantum Apocalypse. In 2011, Jacobsen made a cameo appearance in the Two and a Half Men episode "People Who Love Peepholes" as Charlie's former girl friend, Penelope.

In 2012, she appeared in the 2012 detective thriller film Alex Cross (as played by Tyler Perry), as the businesswoman Fan Yau Lee, who becomes the first victim of the antagonist Picasso (Matthew Fox). Loosely based on the novel Cross by James Patterson, the film was the third installment of the Alex Cross film series and a reboot of said series.

== Filmography ==
Film
Year	Title	Role	Notes
2007	Battlestar Galactica: Razor	Kendra Shaw	Television film
2009	The Devil's Tomb	Yoshi	Direct-to-video
2010	Quantum Apocalypse	Lynne	Television film
2011	Three Inches	Watts	Television film
2012	Alex Cross	Fan Yau	
2014	House of Secrets	Alison	Television film
2018	Occupation	Amelia Chambers	Credited as Stephany Jacobsen

Television
Year	Title	Role	Notes
2000–2001	Pizza	Selina	5 episodes
2001–2002	Home and Away	Charlotte Adams	Seasons 14–15 (role held: 10 September 2001 – 3 September 2002)
2001	Farscape	Nurse Froy	Episode: "Incubator"
2005–2006	headLand	Li-Liu Tan	10 episodes
2008–2009	Terminator: The Sarah Connor Chronicles	Jesse Flores	10 episodes
2009–2010	Melrose Place	Lauren Yung	Main cast; 18 episodes
2011	Two and a Half Men	Penelope	Episode: "People Who Love Peepholes"
2013	Hawaii Five-0	Amy Davidson	Episode: "Hana I WaʻIa"
2014	Revenge	Niko Takeda	4 episodes
2014	Star-Crossed	Eva Benton	5 episodes
2014	NCIS	Leia Pendergast	1 episode
2021	Dota: Dragon's Blood	Drysi	Voice role
