= Mitch Firth =

Australian actor

Mitch Firth (born 28 November 1985 in Sydney, Australia) is an Australian actor best known for his role as Seb Miller in the TV drama series Home and Away.

== Filmography ==
=== Television ===
- Water Rats (1999) as Allan (1 episode)
- All Saints (2000) as Cameron (1 episode)
- Home and Away (2001–04) as Seb Miller, 40 episodes
- All Saints (2000).as Cameron (episode: First Do No Harm)
- Home and Away: Secrets and the City (2002, DVD special) as Seb Miller
- Home and Away: Hearts Divided (2003, DVD special) as Seb Miller

=== Film ===
- The Road from Coorain (2002) as Barry, age 14
- Whiteline (2009, short film) as Richard
- Game On (2010, short film)
- Twenty Ten (2010) as Felix
