= Brodie Hanson =

- Home and Away character
- Portrayed by: Susie Rugg
- Duration: 2000–2002, 2004
- First appearance: 20 July 2000
- Last appearance: 13 February 2004
- Introduced by: John Holmes (2000); Julie McGuaran (2004)
In-universe information
- Occupation: Student
- Mother: Jan Hanson
- Brothers: JT Hanson
- Husband: Alex Poulos (2005–2007)

Brodie Hanson is a fictional character in the Australian television soap opera Home and Away, portrayed by actress Susie Rugg. She made her first appearance on 20 July 2000 and departed on 7 November 2002, she briefly returned in February 2004.

== Development ==
Rugg had been a big fan of Home and Away since she was a child and had a lifelong dream of joining the cast. She originally auditioned for the role of Dani Sutherland, which eventually went to Tammin Sursok. The producers remembered her and shortly after the Dani audition, she was offered the role of new regular character Brodie. Rugg deferred a university course to take up the part. She called Brodie "a great character", and described her as "still struggling to find out who she is, and is facing major life changes. She's kind, genuine and very caring. She's suffered a lot of pain in her life, and doesn't like to see anyone else get hurt."

Writers established a relationship between Brodie and recurring character Miles Alcott (Steven Rooke), which is cut short when he has to leave the Bay. Upon his return, a few months later, they pick up where they left off and Brodie is "overjoyed". Brodie's former boyfriend Alex Poulos (Danny Raco) is consumed with jealously. Rugg explained "Alex is none too happy that Brodie is dating Miles – she is his ex-girlfriend and Miles is one of his oldest mates. When Miles left the first time, Alex spent a couple of weeks trying to get Brodie back, to no avail. So with Miles on the scene again, Alex feels doubly threatened." On the night of the school dance, Miles and Brodie dress up as Anthony and Cleopatra, and Alex offers to drive them to the event in a bid to make peace with them. Rugg said that things are awkward, but Alex has to accept that Miles and Brodie are together. She also said that the evening is "perfect" and the couple are "so happy", until the drive home.

While Brodie and Miles are flirting, Brodie tells Alex to turn the radio down and the car suddenly swerves off the road. Brodie wakes up to find a tree has come through the windscreen and hit Miles, while Alex has a concussion. Rugg commented "The next thing Brodie knows, the ambulance arrives and she's told Miles is dead." Brodie goes into shock and refuses to believe that Miles is dead. Rugg stated that Brodie retreats into herself and no one can get through to her. She struggles to acknowledge that Miles is gone and continually refers to him in present tense while fantasising about seeing him. Rugg admitted that filming the car crash scenes would stay with her for a long time. They filmed the scenes in two parts and Rugg found the second half to be "really graphic" once the car was smashed up. She could not see the cameras or lights, which made it feel real. While Rooke and Raco were acting "totally out of it", Rugg felt "shaken" upon seeing them and all the broken glass.

In late 2002, Jason Herbison from Inside Soap revealed that Rugg had filmed her final scenes as Brodie. Of her exit she stated that "I was sad to leave but I think the time has come to go. The show has enabled me to do a lot of incredible things I wouldn't normally have been able to do." In 2004, Inside Soap's Andrew Fraser revealed that when Brodie returns she would be involved in a "sizzling love triangle" and a dramatic car crash.

== Storylines ==
Brodie arrives in Summer Bay fleeing her abusive mother, Jan (Genevieve Sulway). Shelley Sutherland (Paula Forrest) who works at the Sarah McKay drop-in-centre, takes Brodie into her home, where she and her husband Rhys (Michael Beckley) become her foster parents. Brodie quickly forms a sisterly bond with Shelley and Rhy's daughter, Dani (Tammin Sursok) and soon falls for Mitch McColl (Cameron Welsh), much to the jealousy of his ex-girlfriend, Hayley Smith (Bec Cartwright). Brodie's brother, JT (Luke Ford) arrives and physically attacks Hayley, leaving her traumatised for a while.

After Brodie's relationship with Mitch runs into some trouble, she befriends fellow student Hamish "Woody" Woodford (Chris Foy), who is an outsider. Following a bad reception during the school's talent night, Woody holds Brodie, Sally Fletcher (Kate Ritchie) and the entire class hostage with a gun. Woody is subdued and arrested and Brodie later reconciles with Mitch. Mitch soon leaves for New Zealand to live with his late mother's relatives. After Mitch's departure, Brodie is knocked off her bike by the newly arrived Alex Poulos when she collides with his car and is hospitalised. Brodie recovers after some surgery. Jan reappears in Brodie's life claiming to have changed but that is not the case when she begins flirting with Rhys. Brodie stands up to Jan when she is about to strike her in an argument and she leaves.

Brodie and Alex become a couple but after things get serious and Brodie meets Alex's mother, Helen (Peta Toppano), he breaks up with her. Miles Alcott, Alex's friend arrives in Summer Bay and he is attracted to Brodie and they begin dating, much to Alex's jealousy. They attend the school formal together and Alex drives the couple home but hits a pothole, causing a crash. An Ambulance is called and paramedics do all they can for Miles but are unable to save him and he dies at scene. Brodie blames Alex for Miles' death and remains bitter and hostile towards him for a while, even after the inquest proves the accident was not Alex's fault. After being urged by Shelley, Brodie finally forgives Alex. Brodie then has a short-lived relationship with Mav Patterson (Clayton Williams) and later reunites with Alex. Their reunion is shortened when Brodie decides she wants to see the world after completing Year 12 and they part company.

Brodie returns in early 2004 to find Alex is now dating Hayley. The two girls go to war over Alex and this culminates in a huge car crash which leaves Brodie suffering minor injuries but leaves Hayley with memory loss and disfigurement. Brodie and Alex rekindle their love for one another, but are unsure sure how to tell Hayley. They soon leave after their engagement and marry overseas. When Alex returns to Summer Bay three years, later he reveals that he and Brodie have broken up.

== Reception ==
Sacha Molitorisz of The Sydney Morning Herald said that the episode featuring Brodie and Hayley's car crash was better suited to "die hard fans". They criticised the plot for being "unengaging" and opined that the music, performances and dialogue were "painful" and "patchy". They also stated "The problem is, simply piling one melodrama on top of another will not of itself make for good TV. The characters need to be explored, too. Otherwise the result will be superficial."
