= Beau Brady =

Australian actor (born 1981)

- Born: 11 October 1981 (age 44); Sydney, New South Wales, Australia
- Other names: Beau-jean Antoine Neville Brady; Johnny Brady
- Education: Sydney University
- Occupation: Actor
- Years active: 1999–present
- Notable work: Home and Away
- Partners: Bec Hewitt (separated); Natalie Blair (separated)

Beau Brady (born 11 October 1981) is an Australian actor from Sydney, Australia. He is best known for his role as Noah Lawson on soap opera Home and Away.

== Career ==
Brady attended Oak Hill College, where he took up drama during Year 8. He debuted on television in 1999, playing Joey on Breakers for three episodes. In 2000, he began attending Sydney University to study Film and TV and joined the cast of the soap opera Home and Away as Noah Lawson. He was nominated for four Logie Awards for the role. After leaving the show in 2004, he moved to Los Angeles to pursue acting there. During this time, he took a course with The Acting Corps. He returned to Australia in 2007.

== Personal life ==
Brady was in a well-publicised relationship with his Home and Away costar Bec Hewitt for four years. He was then engaged to Neighbours actress Natalie Blair for a year before their relationship ended in January 2007. In 2018, Brady enlisted in the Australian Army Reserve.

== Filmography ==
=== Film ===
Year	Title	Role	Notes	Ref.
2006	Voodoo Lagoon	Lee	Feature film	
2012	The Sapphires	Marine Sergeant	Feature film	
2015	Damaged	Chock	Feature film; also executive producer	
2016	The System	Tod	Feature film	
2017	The Tree That Bore No Fruit	CEO	Short film	
2018	Entrenched	Jack	Short film	
2021	Wyrmwood: Apocalypse	Soldier 3	Feature film	

=== Television ===
Year	Title	Role	Notes	Ref.
1999	Breakers	Joey	Season 2 (guest, 3 episodes)	
2000–04	Home and Away	Noah Lawson	Seasons 13–17 (main role)	
2002	Home and Away: Secrets and the City	Noah Lawson	Video special	
2005	Home and Away: Romances	Himself – host	Video special	
2006	Crown Australian Celebrity Poker Challenge	Himself	Reality series	
2006	Australia's Next Top Model	Himself	Reality series, Season 2, episode 2	
2007	The King	Tim	TV movie	
2008	The Bill	Andy Southgate	Season 24, episode 55	
2011	The Kangaroo Gang	Billy Hill	Two-part documentary	
2013	Wonderland	Charlie	Season 1, episode 5	
2016	Secret City	Hot Todd	Season 1, episode 4	
2016	Hyde & Seek	Ryan	Season 1, episode 6	
2016–17	We Were Tomorrow	Warrick Blane	Season 1 (6 episodes)	
2017	Dream Channel	Deano Lish	TV series	

== Award nominations ==
Year	Award	Category	Work	Result	Ref.
2001	Logie Awards	Most Popular New Male Talent	Home and Away (Season 13)	Nominated	
2003	Logie Awards	Most Popular Actor	Home and Away (Season 15)	Nominated	
2004	Logie Awards	Most Popular Actor	Home and Away (Season 16)	Nominated	
2005	Logie Awards	Most Popular Actor	Home and Away (Season 17)	Nominated	
