= Daniel Collopy =

Australian actor (born 1978)

- Born: 1 February 1978 (age 48); Melbourne, Australia
- Education: Swinburne University
- Occupations: Actor; photographer
- Years active: 2000–present
- Known for: Neighbours; Home and Away

Daniel Collopy (born 1 February 1978) is an Australian actor and photographer.

== Early life ==
Collopy was born on 1 February 1978 in Melbourne, Australia. He grew up in a large family, as one of eight children, including five brothers and two sisters.

While in high school, he studied drama, and after being involved in a production of Les Misérables, he developed an interest in acting. He went on to study graphic design at Swinburne University, but deferred his second year after landing a job in radio.

== Career ==
Collopy's first television role was in 2000, as the recurring character of Sean Edwards, a love interest for Felicity Scully (played by Holly Valance), in the long-running Australian soap Neighbours. The role lasted a month.

In September 2001, Collopy successfully auditioned for the role of lifeguard turned town mayor Josh West in Home and Away and had to relocate from Melbourne to Sydney within days, to begin filming. His character was introduced as a potential love interest for Dani Sutherland (played by Tammin Sursok). Collopy played Josh from 2001 until 2003, with further guest appearances in both 2005 and 2006. He made his final on-screen appearance on 16 May 2006, when Josh was killed off in a 'whodunnit' style storyline.

In 2003, Collopy was nominated for a Logie Award for Most Popular New Male Talent for his role in Home and Away. In 2009, he guest-starred in the family comedy-drama Packed to the Rafters, the police drama series City Homicide, and the comedy series Jesters.

Since 2007, Collopy has worked as a self-employed commercial photographer based in Los Angeles.

== Filmography ==
=== Film ===
Year	Title	Role	Notes
2015	The Disgustings: Save the Date	Gay Guy 1	Short film

=== Television ===
Year	Title	Role	Notes
2000	Neighbours	Sean Edwards	Season 16, 7 episodes (recurring)
2001–2006	Home and Away	Josh West	Season 14, episodes 18–19 (recurring)
2001–2006	Home and Away	Josh West	Season 15–16 (main role)
2001	Home and Away: Secrets and the City	Josh West	Video special
2009	Packed to the Rafters	Michael	Season 1, episode 20
2009	City Homicide	Clive Manning	Season 3, episodes 1 & 2
2009	The Jesters	Male Fan	Season 1, episode 4

== Awards and nominations ==
Year	Work	Award	Category	Result
2003	Home and Away	Logie Awards	Most Popular New Male Talent	Nominated
