= Christie Hayes =

Australian actress and singer

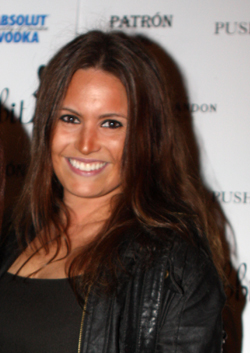
- Christie Hayes in 2011
- Born: Nowra, New South Wales, Australia
- Years active: 1994 – present
- Notable work: Home and Away (2000–05; 2008–09); Dan and Christie (2022–26)
- Spouses: Greg Hatton (m. 2008–2013) Daniel White (m. 2016–2019) Justin Coombes-Pearce (m. 2021)
- Children: 2

Christie Ayrna Lynne Hayes is an Australian actress, known for her work on the television series Home and Away as Kirsty Phillips (née Sutherland) who she played from June 2000 to February 2005, and again from May 2008 to October 2009.

Hayes co-hosted Hobart’s number 1 breakfast show, Dan & Christie on hit100.9 from 2022 until the show was cancelled in 2026.

== Personal life ==
Hayes is the second of four girls in her family and is the sister to actress Katherine Hayes. She grew up in North Nowra. She played the flute, and learned to read music at age 8.

At 21, Hayes married actor/director Greg Hatton in 2008 in the Southern Highlands. OK! purchased the rights to their wedding story for $30,000. Guests at the wedding included Home and Away cast members and actor Joel Edgerton. After five years of marriage, Hayes and Hatton separated then eventually divorced.

Hayes met wine broker Daniel White a few months later. Hayes gave birth to their first child, a son, in October 2014. On 24 April 2015, Hayes announced on The Morning Show that she was pregnant again. Hayes gave birth to a second son in September 2015. In April 2019, Hayes announced she and White had separated.

Hayes announced her engagement to radio announcer Justin Coombes-Pearce in January 2020. The couple decided to elope and were married on 12 May 2021.

== Career ==
Christie Hayes began acting when she was 8 years old after first being approached to become a model. She preferred acting to modelling and spent her childhood in theatre, performing in over 20 plays at her local drama club. She attended the McDonald College for Performing Arts in Strathfield and majored in drama.

In 2000, Hayes was cast as Maria in the family adventure series Search for Treasure Island, a Grundy Production filmed in Spain and shown on Channel 7.

Later that year Hayes was cast as Kirsty Sutherland in the successful soap opera, Home and Away on Channel 7, after turning down the role of Dani Sutherland (her character's older sister), because she was uncomfortable playing someone three years older than herself, Kirsty being 13 and Dani 16.

She was the first person to be cast in her on-screen "Sutherland" family. She played both Kirsty Phillips (née Sutherland) and Laura DeGroot (the two characters were twin sisters separated at birth). Hayes, who was on the cover of TV Week more times in 2004 than any of her other castmates, left Home and Away in October 2004 in order to travel. Her final H&A appearance aired in February 2005.

After leaving the show she appeared as the face of the Pepsi Light campaign in Summer 2006 and made a guest appearance on the soap Blue Water High. She was also involved in the making of various films and television shows, including Room 101, Searching For Eva, The First Goodbye and Noir.

Hayes played the lead in I.D the film as Kate in 2011.

Hayes returned to Home and Away in May 2008, in a recurring role until October 2009. She is also a model and has been the face of Miki House, Pepsi and Jeans for Genes.

In January 2017, Hayes commenced working on breakfast radio at I98FM in Wollongong. She joined the cast of soap opera Neighbours in 2019 in a guest role.

Hayes co-hosted the Dan and Christie breakfast radio show on hit100.9 Hobart from 2022 until 2026. The show was cancelled as part of a Southern Cross Media Group restructure, with 300 jobs being axed. Prior to the axing, the show was Hobart’s number one breakfast radio show, with 21.2% of Hobart radio listeners tuning in at the most recent radio survey.

== Charity work ==
In 2003, at age 16, Youth Week elected her as youth ambassador of Australia for encouraging youth across Australia to realise their creativity.

== Filmography ==
=== Film ===
Year	Title	Role	Notes
2008	Room 101		Short film
2009	Burden	Jill Johnson	Short film
2011	I.D	Kate	Film
2019	Flat Out Like a Lizard Drinking	Ellen – Casting Director	Short film
2020	I'm Still Here	Ellen	Short film
2020	Out Here on My Own	Ellen	Short film
2021	Willow!!!!	Ellen	Short film
2022	Muted	Trisha Cox	Short film
2023	Hired	Ellen	Short film
2023	Finally Me	Coach Green	Feature film

=== Television ===
Year	Title	Role	Notes
1995–97	Ocean Girl	Pretty kid	TV series, 2 episodes
1998	Water Rats	Little girl	TV series, 3 episodes
1999	Blue Heelers	Kid	TV series, 1 episode
2000	Search for Treasure Island	Maria	TV series, 14 episodes
2000–05; 2008–09	Home and Away	Kirsty Sutherland/Phillips / Laura De Groot	TV series, main cast
2002	Home and Away: Secrets and the City	Kirsty Sutherland	TV special
2003	Home and Away: Hearts Divided	Kirsty Sutherland	TV special
2008	Blue Water High	Melanie	TV series, 1 episode
2019	Neighbours	Ebony Buttrose	TV series, 9 episodes
TBA	Charli & Jude	Jude	TV series

== Radio ==
Year	Title	Role	Notes
2022—26	Dan & Christie Breakfast Radio Show	Co-host	Hit 100.9 FM
