= Paula Forrest =

Australian actress

- Born: 14 July 1965 (age 59); Australia
- Occupation: Actress
- Years active: 1992–2014

Paula Forrest (born 14 July, c. 1965) an Australian actress, best known for playing the role of Shelley Sutherland on the long-running Australian soap opera Home and Away

In Home and Away (1988), Forrest played the part of Shelley who was the wife of Rhys, played by Michael Beckley and mother to Dani, played by Tammin Sursok, Jade, played by Kate Garven and Kirsty, played by Christie Hayes who lived in the Caravan Park and worked as a social worker. Shelley was a loveable character who fought long and hard for her family and friends alike. Until late 2002 when her world was torn apart by the discovery of her husband's affair and later on in 2003 the fact that Jade was not her real daughter and had in fact been switched at birth. Paula featured in a Home and Away special, called Home and Away: Secrets and the City.

Her character made a brief return to Home and Away in 2009.

Note : Paula Forrest is the patronym of the novel The Little Lady of the Big House, by Jack London (1916).

== Filmography ==
Television
Year	Title	Role	Notes
1992	Police Rescue	Katie Baldwin	Season 2, episode 4
1993	G.P.	Gabrielle Henderson	Season 5, episode 13
1995–96	Spellbinder	Mrs. Gibson	Season 1 (recurring, 8 episodes)
1997	Murder Call	Susan Frickberge	Season 1, episode 10
1999	Water Rats	Dr. Fiona Hall Jones	Season 4, episode 18
2000–02; 2003–04, 2009	Home and Away	Shelley Sutherland	Seasons 13–15 (main role, 85 episodes); Seasons 16–17, 22 (recurring, 15 episodes)
2002	Home and Away: Secrets and the City	Shelley Sutherland	Special (main role)
2003	Home and Away: Hearts Divided	Shelley Sutherland	Special (guest role)
2008	Double Trouble	Audition Judge	Season 1, episodes 10 & 11 (uncredited)
2014	Love Child	Helen	Season 1, episode 2

Film
Year	Title	Role	Notes
1993	Love in Limbo	Miss Cornish	
1993	Blackfellas	Policewoman	
1996	Watching	(unknown/undisclosed role)	Short
