= List of Home and Away characters introduced in 1998 =

Home and Away is an Australian soap opera. The following is a list of characters that first appeared in 1998, by order of appearance. They were all introduced by the show's executive producer John Holmes. The 11th season of Home and Away began airing on the Seven Network on 12 January 1998. The first introduction of year was Will Smith, played by Zac Drayson. Several episodes later, the Nash family consisting of parents Joel and Natalie and their children Tom and Gypsy debuted. April saw the birth of Olivia Fraser Richards. September saw the first appearance of Byron Fisher and in the same month Bec Cartwright took on the role of Will's sister, Hayley. Scott Major guested as armed robber Murray in October. David D'Angelo arrived in November.

== Opening titles cast timeline ==
Color key
Main cast (opening credits)
Recurring guest star (closing credits in 3+ episodes)
Guest star (closing credits in 1–2 episodes)

Character	Actor	1997–98	1998		
Character	Actor	2291–2345	2346–2415	2416–2455	2456–2525
Pippa Fletcher	Debra Lawrence	M			
Sally Fletcher	Kate Ritchie	M	M	M	M
Ailsa Stewart	Judy Nunn	M	M	M	M
Alf Stewart	Ray Meagher	M	M	M	M
Donald Fisher	Norman Coburn	M	M	M	M
Sam Marshall	Ryan Clark	M	M	M	M
Irene Roberts	Lynne McGranger	M	M	M	M
Marilyn Chambers	Emily Symons	M	M	M	M
Travis Nash	Nic Testoni	M	M	M	M
Chloe Richards	Kristy Wright	M	M	M	M
Joey Rainbow	Alex O'Han	M	M	M	M
Jesse McGregor	Ben Unwin	M	M	M	M
Rebecca Fisher	Belinda Emmett	M	M	M	M
Lachlan Fraser	Richard Grieve	M	M		
Tiegan Brook	Sally Marrett	M	M	M	M
Aaron Welles	Richie Gudgeon	M	M	M	
Justine Welles	Bree Desborough	M	M	M	M
Vinnie Patterson	Ryan Kwanten	R	R	M	M
Joel Nash	David E. Woodley	R	R	M	M
Natalie Nash	Angelica La Bozzetta	R	R	M	M
Gypsy Nash	Kimberley Cooper	R	R	M	M
Will Smith	Zac Drayson	R	R	M	M
Tom Nash	Graeme Squires	R	R	M	M

== Will Smith ==
Will Smith, played by Zac Drayson, made his first on-screen appearance on 13 February 1998. Will was a regular on the show from 1998 to 2002 and continued to make frequent guest appearances until 2005. In 2010, it was announced that the character and Drayson would be returning to the show. Will returned to the Bay with his daughter on 14 October 2010. Drayson was originally cast in the role of Tom Nash, but at the last minute the show's producers thought he would be more suited to the "rougher" upcoming role of Will. The character left Summer Bay after marrying Gypsy Nash (Kimberley Cooper). Drayson made occasional guest appearances in the show from 2003 to 2005. In September 2010, it was announced that Drayson had reprised his role of Will and would be returning to Home and Away. Will was originally described as a "hot-tempered trouble maker" who arrives in the Bay to reconnect with his siblings, Hayley (Rebecca Hewitt) and Nick (Chris Egan). Will learns to calm down and when he decides to leave the Bay he was, by then, considered a "good bloke".

== Natalie Nash ==
Natalie Nash, played by Angelica la Bozzetta, made her first on-screen appearance on 18 February 1998. In 1997, following Debra Lawrance's decision to quit her role as Pippa Ross producers decided to introduce a new family to run the caravan park, because the household was seen as the "centrepieice of the show". They created the Nash family consisting of parents Natalie and Joel Nash, played by la Bozzetta and David Woodley respectively and children Gypsy (Kimberley Cooper) and Tom (Graeme Squires). la Bozetta quit the role in late 1998 to spend more time with her daughter. Antoinette Byron was cast in the role and made her debut in the 1999 season premiere. Channel 5 chose the episode where Natalie and Joel return to Summer Bay with their children, Tom and Gypsy, as one of their best episodes from the last 25 years of the serial.

== Joel Nash ==
Joel Nash, played by David Woodley, made his first appearance on 18 February and departed on 11 October 2000. Prior to acting career, Woodley had worked as a federal police officer in Melbourne. Before taking on the role of Joel, Woodley previously guested on the serial as Finlay Roberts' (Tina Thomsen) partner Barry, in 1996.

== Gypsy Nash ==
Gypsy Nash, played by Kimberley Cooper, debuted on-screen during the episode airing on 18 February 1998. Gypsy and departed in 2002. She returned on 9 September 2011 and departed on 13 October 2011. In 1997, after Debra Lawrance quit her role as Pippa Ross producers decided to introduce a new family to run the caravan park, because the household was seen as the "centrepiece of the show". They created the Nash family consisting of Gypsy played by Cooper, sibling Tom (Graeme Squires) and their parents Natalie and Joel Nash played by Angelica la Bozzetta and David Woodley respectively. The family come to Summer Bay from Hong Kong to start a new life. In June 2011, it was announced that Cooper had reprised her role as Gypsy and had returned to filming in May. Cooper confirmed that Gypsy's return would be "dramatic, in true Gypsy style". Gypsy returned with her daughter Lily in September 2011. At the 41st Logie Awards Cooper won the "Most Popular New Female Talent" award for her portrayal of Gypsy, she was the first ever recipient of the award. Gypsy's kidnapping was nominated for "Most Dramatic Storyline" at the 1999 Inside Soap Awards. The following year, Cooper won an award in the "Best Aussie actress" category. Soap opera reporting website Holy Soap included Gypsy on their list of "Sexiest Home and Away girls ever" list. They also brand her most memorable moments as; "being kidnapped and having a baby with Will Smith".

== Tom Nash ==
Tom Nash, played by Graeme Squires, made his first screen appearance during the episode broadcast on 18 February 1998. Zac Drayson was originally cast in the role, but when the producers thought he would be more suitable for Will Smith, Squires received the part. The actor decided to leave Home and Away in early 2000 after two years Tom departed on 16 May 2000. and he made his screen exit on 16 May 2000. Squires returned to film the show's 3,000th episode special in 2001. Zac Drayson was originally cast in the role of Tom, but the producers later thought he would be more suited to the "rougher" role of Will Smith. Squires was then cast as Tom and he revealed that he was honoured to be a part of the Home and Away crew. He told Jason Herbison of All About Soap that the best thing to happen to him was getting the part of Tom. He explained "I had done some modelling before, but Home and Away was definitely my first big acting break. It's what people know me for and I'm very grateful that I was given the role." A writer for official Home and Away website described Tom as "your typical cricket-in-summer, rugby-in-winter kind of guy; he's sporty, good-looking and a bit of a ladies' man!" When asked if he shared any similarities with his character, Squires stated that they were both creative and liked the outdoors. He added that Tom is more outgoing, while he is much more quieter. For his portrayal of Tom, Squires earned a nomination for Most Popular New Male Talent at the Logie Awards of 1999. Robin Oliver of The Sydney Morning Herald called Tom and Gypsy "good-looking children". Inside Soap's Steven Murphy said Tom and Terri's relationship was the hottest romance of the lot. Claire Brand and Annette Dasey of the same publication called Tom "the darling of Summer Bay", while Soaplife's Tina Baker branded the character "tasty Tom".

== Olivia Fraser Richards ==
Olivia Fraser Richards made her first appearance on 20 April 1998. The character was born on-screen to Lachlan Fraser (Richard Grieve) and Chloe Richards (Kristy Wright). When she returned to the serial in 2005, Olivia was played by Ivy Latimer. Following Chloe's death, Olivia leaves the Bay with her uncle James (Michael Piccirilli). In October 2015, the character returned to Home and Away with Raechelle Banno in the role. Olivia returns to Summer Bay in the hope that her mother's former foster carer Irene Roberts (Lynne McGranger) will look after her, following some trouble at her school in London. Olivia flirts with VJ Patterson (Matt Little) upon her arrival and Banno commented, "She's very forward. I think she wants his attention and she just puts herself out there."

== Hayley Smith ==
Hayley Smith was portrayed from September 1998 to September 2005 by actress Rebecca Cartwright and from September to November 2005 by Ella Scott Lynch, after Cartwright left the show for personal reasons. Described by The Sun-Herald as one of the "best-loved characters in Australian drama", Cartwright won the 2005 Logie Award for Most Popular Actress for her portrayal of Smith and was nominated for a Gold Logie the same year. The Sun-Herald described the character of Smith as "trouble-prone" and "an artistic young widow who has overcome a graffiti problem".

== Byron Fisher ==
Byron Fisher
- Home and Away character
- Portrayed by: Max Spessot (vision); Brittany Jones and Joel Sanders-Aguius; Patrick-Douglas Langlands; Paul-James Langlands; Edward and William Lowata; Nathaniel Davey (vision)
- Duration: 1998–1999, 2010
- First appearance: 16 September 1998
- Last appearance: 1 April 2010
- Introduced by: John Holmes (1998); Cameron Welsh (2010)
In-universe information
- Father: Donald Fisher
- Mother: Marilyn Chambers
- Half-brothers: Alan Fisher
- Half-sisters: Rebecca Nash; Bobby Marshall; Heather Fraser
- Grandfathers: George Davidson
- Grandmothers: Isobel DuPre; Heather Davidson
- Nephews: Seb Miller
- First cousins: David Croft; Lucinda Croft

Byron Fisher, played by a number of child actors, made his first appearance on 16 September 1998 as a vision in his mother Marilyn's (Emily Symons) dream during her pregnancy. Byron was born on 16 February 1999 and was played by Brittany Jones and Joel Sanders-Aguius. Nathanial Davey portrayed an 11-year-old Byron in a vision.

Byron is born to Marilyn and Donald Fisher (Norman Coburn). He is given the middle name Vincent after Vinnie Patterson (Ryan Kwanten) speeds through traffic to get Marilyn to hospital. Marilyn struggles to connect with Byron and suffers from post-natal depression and walks out on him and Donald. She returns several months later and finds herself feeling pushed out by Byron's nanny, Ellen Porter (Anne Grigg). However, Ellen leaves and Marilyn is able to bond with Byron and the Fishers settle into a relatively normal family life. However, this is cut short when Byron is diagnosed with cancer and the best chance of saving him is to have him treated overseas. Marilyn and Byron then leave for America. Donald sells his Streeton painting in order to raise the money for Byron's treatment and Simon Broadhurst (Morgan O'Neill) buys it but returns it to Donald. Donald prepares to join Marilyn but receives a call with the news Byron has died. Donald flies to America for Byron's funeral service but returns alone after Marilyn runs off again. Donald later writes a book called Letter to Byron and it is illustrated by Hayley Smith (Bec Cartwright).

Byron appears to Marilyn in a dream as an 11 year old when she begins having visions of the late Amber Copeland (Mitzi Ruhlman). Rabbit introduces Marilyn to Byron and he says hello.

Byron's birth was chosen by Channel 5 as one of their "Best Ever" episodes.

== Murray ==
Murray
- Home and Away character
- Portrayed by: Scott Major
- First appearance: 20 October 1998
- Last appearance: 30 October 1998
- Introduced by: John Holmes

Murray, played by Scott Major, made his first appearance on 20 October 1998. A television critic for The Advertiser confirmed Major's guest appearance on 14 October. They called him "an armed and dangerous young man", who would end up shooting Sally Fletcher (Kate Ritchie) after being rejected for a job. Channel 5 chose Murray's hold-up of the Diner of one of their best episodes ever.

Murray first appears on the beach where he loads his gun and heads towards the Bayside diner. He orders breakfast and when the time comes to pay, he tells Ailsa Stewart (Judy Nunn) he has no money and offers to help out but she refuses. When Ailsa goes to call the police, Murray locks the door and holds her hostage at gunpoint. Ailsa's husband Alf (Ray Meagher) returns and discovers her held hostage. To get rid of Murray, Ailsa gives him the float from the till and while he is distracted, Alf attempts to hit Murray to retrieve the money with a mallet but is stopped.

Murray prepares to flee but officers Joel Nash (David Woodley) and Terri Garner (Alyson Standen) come in for coffee. After the police leave, he goes to leave with the money but panics when Terri returns and fires a shot which hits Sally Fletcher in the leg. He then holds the customers at gunpoint and is reluctant to let them help Sally. He then flees and hides out in a cave for several days and is discovered by Sam Marshall (Ryan Clark) and Hayley Smith (Bec Cartwright) who he takes hostage. Hayley's brother Will (Zac Drayson) and his girlfriend Gypsy Nash (Kimberley Cooper) find them and are also taken hostage. The next morning the teens try to escape while Murray is asleep but they disturb him and he continues to hold them hostage. Will tries to sympathize by telling Murray about his own experiences of being on the streets. Sam and Hayley escape and Gypsy tries to but Murray catches her. Will bargains with Murray to release Gypsy and give himself up. Joel and Constable Barry Dennis (Mark Shaw) arrest him. Murray then appears as a vision in Ailsa's subconscious when she sees a lookalike customer who comes into the diner.

== David D'Angelo ==
David D'Angelo
- Home and Away character
- Portrayed by: Valentino Arico; Ross Pennissi; Tony Poli
- Duration: 1998–99
- First appearance: 9 November 1998
- Last appearance: 13 October 1999
In-universe information
- Other names: Robert Perez; Mr X.

David D'Angelo (alias Robert Perez) made his first appearance on 9 November 1998, played by Valentino Arico and then by Ross Pennissi in shadow form, credited as Mr. X. Tony Poli began playing David until the character's departure on 13 October 1999.

David's storyline sees him play out his revenge against Joel Nash (David Woodley) who imprisoned him for 15 years in Hong Kong. He uses Joel's daughter Gypsy (Kimberley Cooper) as a pawn in his plan by posing as her tutor, before kidnapping her. Cooper told the official Home and Away website of her experiences filming with Poli in the storyline: "It was pretty scary. I can't really describe it. It was kind of fun but it was kind of hard." She then told how Poli was "so much fun" and helped her in a lot of situations. "He pointed out a few things and just talked me through it and he gave me a lot of feedback, too. He was really cool." When asked if Poli was anything like his character, Cooper added: "No, not at all. And to watch him do Robert and then see him talking to his son on the phone making baby noises was pretty strange."

David arrives in Summer Bay and secretly records a conversation between Gypsy and Justine Welles (Bree Desborough) and then records a conversation between Gypsy's father, Joel and uncle Travis (Nic Testoni). He assumes the name Robert Perez and begins dating Gypsy. He then moves into the Caravan Park and advertises his services as a Maths Tutor and is hired by Joel and his wife Natalie (Angelica la Bozetta) to help Gypsy improve her grades. David sends a tape of Joel and Travis' conversation where Joel admits he does not want any more kids to Natalie and she is upset. Travis and his wife Rebecca (Belinda Emmett) become suspicious of David when he mentions Joel and Natalie's problems and they alert them. David tells Gypsy about a book sale and takes off with her, in order to kidnap her. Gypsy's brother, Tom (Graeme Squires) and Will Smith (Zac Drayson) break into David's caravan and they discover newspaper cuttings featuring Joel and his return to Summer Bay. It emerges David is a criminal Joel apprehended in Hong Kong. He holds Gypsy hostage for three weeks and sends the Nashes some cryptic clues in the form of recorded poems by Gypsy and crossword puzzles. He later takes Joel hostage then dumps him in the woods and tells him he has two hours to save his family. David steals Joel's identity and cleans out his bank account and then sets fire to the Nashes house with Natalie (now played by Antoinette Byron), Tom and Gypsy inside. During the blaze, David takes Natalie hostage and Joel apprehends David after Natalie gives clues to her whereabouts via telephone. David is then jailed and Joel visits him to demand his money back but David has the last laugh when he riles him about Gypsy, angering him.

David escapes from prison several months later to retrieve the money he stole, which is buried in the bush but is enraged to discover that Duncan Stewart (Brendan McKensy) and Gazza Boyd (Sebastian Huber) have already found the money. He then threatens to harm Duncan and his mother, Ailsa (Judy Nunn). He orders Duncan to retrieve the money from Gazza and warns him Ailsa will be hurt if he calls the police. David then gags Ailsa and takes Duncan hostage and tries to flee the country with his accomplice Lauren Healy (Merridy Eastman). Joel tracks David down with several officers and the chase culminates in David losing his footing and Joel saves him from a cliff fall. He files a complaint against Joel, alleging that he hit him, bloodying his nose but Joel proves his innocence and David is jailed once more.

Rachel Browne of The Sun-Herald listed David's vendetta among the best television cliffhangers at the close of the 1998 Australian television season. Ahead of the 1999 Season premiere, she described David as a "Hooded Psycho bent on revenge". David's kidnapping of Gypsy and stalking of the Nash family was nominated for "Most Dramatic Storyline" at the 1999 Inside Soap Awards.

== Others ==
Date(s)	Character	Actor	Circumstances
19–20 January	Gordon Macleay	Danny Adcock	An illegal arms dealer who Travis Nash (Nic Testoni) finds adrift on a Yacht. Gordon is sick and Travis takes him to hospital.
22 January	George Baker	James Hagan	Alf Stewart's (Ray Meagher) lawyer. He advises Alf to settle with Jesse McGregor (Ben Unwin) out of court for $10,000.
23 January–2 February	Sludge	Steve Pate	A friend of Sam's (Ryan Clark) and student at Summer Bay High. Sam tried to use him as an alibi when he joined Rod Sutton's (Nick Atkinson) ram-raiding gang.
22 January	Warren Hickson	Andrew Marshall	A member of the Department of Childcare Services. He informs Pippa Ross (Debra Lawrence) of her options regarding her impending departure from Summer Bay and its effect on her foster children.
30 January	Christine McKenzie	Linda Newton	A right-wing politician whose beliefs about deporting immigrants do not sit well with the Bay and a demonstration occurs at her rally in the Surf Club.
2 February–30 October 2000	Barry Dennis	Mark Shaw	A local constable. He is frequently seen in police matters with colleague Joel Nash (David Woodley).
3 February	Darren	Jordon Askill	A drummer who auditions for Joey Rainbow (Alex O'Han) and Aaron Welles' (Ritchie Gudgeon) band.
25–27 February	Carol Williams	Diana Davidson	A neighbour of Lachlan Fraser (Richard Grieve) and Chloe Richards (Kristy Wright), her visits are a source of irritation for the couple.
10–11 March	Ralph Marchant	Nicholas Garsden	A tour guide who brings a group of tourists to Summer Bay. Vinnie Patterson (Ryan Kwanten) takes the group out but crashes Travis Nash's (Nic Testoni) boat.
18 March–24 April	Jason Duncan	Paul Kelman	The manager of fast food chain Bonza Burger. His wife Tamara (Sarah Aubrey) is pregnant but he begins an affair with Terri Garner (Alyson Standen). The affair is discovered and Tamara leaves Jason. He then hires Vinnie Patterson (Ryan Kwanten) to work for him but Vinnie tries everything to get fired. Jason later leaves the Bay.
18–25 March	Tamara Duncan	Sarah Aubrey	Jason Duncan's (Paul Kelman) wife. The couple meet Lachlan Fraser (Richard Grieve) and Chloe Richards (Kristy Wright) at an antenatal class. When Tamara discovers Jason is seeing Terri Garner (Alyson Standen), she leaves him and denies him access to their unborn child.
26 March	Chris Brown	Luke Jacobz	A soccer player at Summer Bay High. During a soccer game in a PE lesson, Will Smith (Zac Drayson) deliberately injures Chris out of jealousy of his attraction to Gypsy Nash (Kimberley Cooper).
30 March	Geoffrey Burns	Ben Price	Geoffrey meets Selina Roberts (Tempany Deckert) in Africa when she suffers from malaria and brings her to Ironbridge to recover.
30 March	Bill Burns	Michael Carter	The father of Geoffrey Burns (Ben Price). He shows a brief interest in Irene Roberts (Lynne McGranger) who arrives to visit an unwell Selina Roberts (Tempany Deckert). The following year Bill invites Irene to visit him for several weeks and she accepts.
30 March	Waitress	Lorraine Brown	The waitress asks Bill Burns (Michael Carter) and Irene Roberts (Lynne McGranger) if they are ready to order, and Bill asks for two game pies.
30 March	George	Richard Clohessy	Geoffrey Burns's (Ben Price) co-worker at the Living Museum. After realising Selina Roberts (Tempany Deckert) is getting back together with Steven Matheson (Adam Willits), Geoffrey asks George if he fancies two weeks in the Greek isles.
31 March–2 April	Pam Edmonson	Rebecca O'Dare	Pam meets Sam Marshall (Ryan Clark) at a surf carnival. She wins the girls' under-18 race.
3–6 April	George Berry	Rhiannon Mason	A crisis care foster child who stays temporarily with Travis (Nic Testoni) and Rebecca Nash (Belinda Emmett). She behaves badly including licking the ice cream in the freezer and disturbing Sally Fletcher (Kate Ritchie) when she tries to study by blasting loud music. She tries to hit Travis but he overpowers her. George is later moved to another home.
8 April–28 May	Bruce "Chook" Fowler	Shannon Cooper	A friend of Sam Marshall (Ryan Clark). He helps Sam play a practical joke on Tiegan Brook (Sally Marrett) and later buys drugs from Lillian Reynolds (Nitya Gehl) and has a bad reaction. Chook and Lillian are nearly expelled as a result but Donald Fisher (Norman Coburn) retracts his decision.
9–21 April	Sugar O'Donnell	Brooke Gissing	Sugar and her twin sister Candy (Bianca Gissing) take a liking to Tom Nash (Graeme Squires) and Aaron Welles (Ritchie Gudgeon) respectively. Tom's mother, Natalie (Angelica la Bozzetta) takes a dislike to Sugar but Tom keeps on seeing her. The relationship breaks down when Sugar leaves Tom for Ben (Toby Gibson).
9–17 April	Candy O'Donnell	Bianca Gissing	Candy and her twin sister Sugar (Brooke Gissing) take a liking to Aaron Welles (Ritchie Gudgeon) and Tom Nash (Graeme Squires) respectively.
15–24 April	Nigel Whittaker	Stephen Holford	An interior decorator hired by Ailsa Stewart (Judy Nunn) to redecorate the Bayside Diner.
17 April	Ben	Tony Gibson	The lead singer of a band, who Sugar O'Donnell (Brooke Gissing) leaves Tom Nash (Graeme Squires) for.
20–21 April	Dr Matthew	Alan Lock	A doctor who delivers Lachlan Fraser (Richard Grieve) and Chloe Richards' (Kristy Wright) newborn daughter, Olivia.
22 April	Christina	Marina Finlay	The editor of Cheeky Magazine presents Joey Rainbow (Alex O'Han), who is in the guise of "Josey Rainbow", with a cash prize of $1000 for his essay on "The Girl of the 90s". Christina and her assistant Isabella oversee the event.
22 April	Isabella	Kylie Watson	The editor of Cheeky Magazine presents Joey Rainbow (Alex O'Han), who is in the guise of "Josey Rainbow", with a cash prize of $1000 for his essay on "The Girl of the 90s". Christina and her assistant Isabella oversee the event.
22–23 April	Policeman	Reg Cribb	A policeman who pulls Kylie Burton (Roslyn Oades) over for speeding while she is on the run from the law. Kylie lies about her identity and uses that of Rebecca Nash (Belinda Emmett).
1–20 May	Harry MacKintosh	Sam O'Dell	A Year 12 student at Summer Bay High who supplies Lillian Reynolds (Nitya Gehl) with dope to sell to Gypsy Nash (Kimberley Cooper). When Lillian is expelled he begins making life difficult for Gypsy and her boyfriend Will Smith (Zac Drayson) and begins intimidating Will. Will agrees to fight Harry but it is quickly broken up by Natalie Nash (Angelica la Bozetta).
12 May–5 June	Leila	Michelle Fondacaro	A Year 11 student from Iran. Aaron Welles (Ritchie Gudgeon) and Tom Nash (Graeme Squires) both take an interest with her and date her alternately and compete for her affections in various contests including poetry recitals and assault courses but in the end she chooses neither boy.
20–25 May	Professor Dunstan	David Nettheim	A neurosurgeon who attends to Lachlan Fraser (Richard Grieve) during his brain surgery to remove a tumour. He assures Lachie's partner Chloe Richards (Kristy Wright) and Irene Roberts (Lynne McGranger) that Lachie has survived the worst and will be fine. However, Lachie falls into a coma several days later and Dunstan rushes back to assist with the operation.
22 May–18 February 2000	Emily O'Kane	Rochelle Eardley	A friend of Rachel McGregor (Sarah Mumcu).
22 May–12 June	Mardi O'Kane	Kelly Cawley	Emily O'Kane's (Rochelle Eardley) mother. She begins a relationship with Jesse McGregor (Ben Unwin), but they break up after Jesse admits he still loves his daughter Rachel's (Sarah Mumcu) mother, Kylie Burton (Roslyn Oades).
19 June–22 October	Daria Ellis	Tamra Williams	Daria appears when Sam Marshall (Ryan Clark) begins delivering newspapers in her neighbourhood. They share a common interest - surfing and begin dating. Daria's hippy lifestyle is often mocked by her classmates but Sam supports her. She struggles to tell Sam she has epilepsy and has a seizure one day. She recovers but Sam is cautious around her, prompting fears he does not want to go out with her. Sam assures he does and they reconcile. Daria is unimpressed when her father Sean (Mark Gerber) begins dating the much younger Sally Fletcher (Kate Ritchie) and voices her disapproval. Tanya (Antonia Murphy), Daria's estranged mother arrives and she sets about trying to get her parents back together but Sean and Tanya's bickering grinds things to a halt and Tanya leaves. Daria's relationship with Sam ends when he dumps her for Hayley Smith (Bec Cartwright).
19 June–4 September	Sean Ellis	Mark Gerber	The father of Daria Ellis (Tamra Williams). He sets up a surf shop in the area and begins dating Sally Fletcher (Kate Ritchie) who is a great deal younger than him. In spite of the opinions of many locals, Sean and Sally become a couple. The relationship breaks down when Sean's estranged wife Tanya (Antonia Murphy) returns and they share a kiss. It looks like they will reconcile but the arguments remind Sean why their marriage broke down in the first place and Tanya leaves again. Soon after, Sean leaves the Bay to set up shop elsewhere.
24 June–17 March 2003	John Wilson	Bryan Wiseman	A doctor at Northern Districts Hospital.
1 July	Mark Hollis	Matt Juarez	Mark and his friend abduct Rachel McGregor (Sara Mumcu) from a shopping mall in Yabbie Creek
1 July	Jason	Shaun Losesby	Mark's friend.
1 July	Mrs Hollis	Felicity Soper	Mark's mother
9 July–14 August	Colt	Brendan Cowell	The leader singer of rock band Monkey Jam. He recruits Aaron Welles (Ritchie Gudgeon) to join his band, much to the opposition of Aaron's sister, Justine (Bree Desborough) and foster parents Alf (Ray Meagher) and Ailsa Stewart (Ray Meagher). Tiegan Brook (Sally Marrett) develops an attraction to Colt and they have sex in his car. Colt also convinces Tiegan to come on tour with him and they all leave, however Tiegan returns several weeks later.
13–29 July	Phil Flatley	Benjamin Hawker	The drummer for Monkey Jam. He is critical of Aaron Welles' (Ritchie Gudgeon) playing style.
15–30 July	Judith Wade	Lyn Lovett	The owner of a store in the mall in Yabbie Creek. She is irritated by the presence of Will Smith (Zac Drayson), Gypsy Nash (Kimberley Cooper), Tiegan Brook (Sally Marrett) and Sam Marshall (Ryan Clark) outside her shop. She accuses Will of assaulting her and he is charged but after a realizing she has made a mistake, Judith drops the charges.
16–27 July	Mr. Wade	David Whitford	The husband of Judith Wade (Lyn Lovett). He explains his wife's paranoia of teens hanging around outside the store as she was previously mugged.
20 July–6 August	Douglas Dawson	Ivar Kants	Douglas runs a computer class which Irene Roberts (Lynne McGranger) attends. Irene becomes interested in Douglas but is shocked to learn he is gay.
23 July 1998 – 26 October 2003	Mike Carter	Stephen Leeder	A Detective Inspector at Yabbie Creek police station and Joel Nash's (David Woodley) superior. He oversees various investigations over a five-year period before being replaced by Peter Baker (Nicholas Bishop).
13 August	Max	Steve McCarthy	Douglas Dawson's (Ivar Kants) boyfriend. Douglas introduces him to Irene Roberts (Lynne McGranger) at the diner.
13 August	Margaret Burton	Lynne Turner	The mother of Kylie Burton (Roslyn Oades) who attends her funeral.
20 August–3 September	Eddie	Tim McCunn	The boyfriend of Chantal (Toni Moran), who blackmails Marilyn Fisher (Emily Symons) for large sums of money. When their scheme backfires, both are arrested and jailed.
24 August–3 September	Tanya Ellis	Antonia Murphy	The ex-wife of Sean Ellis (Mark Gerber) and the mother of their daughter, Daria (Tamra Williams). She and Sean briefly reunite but they begin arguing again and Tanya leaves after a tearful goodbye with Daria at the bus stop.
21–30 September	Catherine Clements	Belinda Giblin	A blind woman who is a customer of the caravan park. She strikes up a brief friendship with Alf Stewart (Ray Meagher) who stays at the park temporarily. She saves Alf's life when a fire breaks out at the park and then leaves after he reconciles with his wife Ailsa (Judy Nunn).
22 September–29 October	Suzie Morris	Lauren Dubois	A student in Year 11 who takes a liking to Tom Nash (Graeme Squires) which his girlfriend Justine Welles (Bree Desborough) is unhappy about. Things worsen between the girls when Suzie lands the role of Juliet in the school production of Romeo & Juliet.
24 September–13 October	John Simpson	Bryan Marshall	A school inspector who visits Summer Bay High. He begins a relationship with Irene Roberts (Lynne McGranger) but his controlling nature puts her off and she ends things with him. Enraged, John frames her for theft of some school files. Irene faces prosecution until a woman John sexually harassed comes forward about his true nature and he is later exposed and arrested.
25 November	Dana	Uncredited	Lachlan Fraser's (Richard Grieve) new partner. She is seen at a Thanksgiving meal held at her father's house in California, along with her brother Charlie. Lachie's former partner Chloe Richards (Kristy Wright) is devastated when she sees them together. Dana and Lachie later marry, but the marriage is cut short when Lachie dies of a brain haemorrhage.
25 November	Charlie	Ben Read	Lachlan Fraser's (Richard Grieve) new partner. She is seen at a Thanksgiving meal held at her father's house in California, along with her brother Charlie. Lachie's former partner Chloe Richards (Kristy Wright) is devastated when she sees them together. Dana and Lachie later marry, but the marriage is cut short when Lachie dies of a brain haemorrhage.
25 November	Father	Jim Converse	Lachlan Fraser's (Richard Grieve) new partner. She is seen at a Thanksgiving meal held at her father's house in California, along with her brother Charlie. Lachie's former partner Chloe Richards (Kristy Wright) is devastated when she sees them together. Dana and Lachie later marry, but the marriage is cut short when Lachie dies of a brain haemorrhage.
