= Natalie Nash =

- Home and Away character
- Antoinette Byron as Natalie
- Portrayed by: Angelica La Bozzetta (1998); Antoinette Byron (1999–2000)
- Duration: 1998–2000
- First appearance: 18 February 1998
- Last appearance: 11 October 2000
- Introduced by: John Holmes
In-universe information
- Occupation: Teacher
- Husband: Joel Nash
- Sons: Tom Nash; Connor Nash
- Daughters: Gypsy Nash
- Granddaughters: Lily Smith; Rachel McGregor

Natalie Nash is a fictional character from the Australian television soap opera Home and Away, played by Antoinette Byron. She made her first appearance during the episode broadcast on 18 February 1998. Natalie was originally played by Angelica La Bozzetta until she quit the serial the same year. Byron was then cast in the role and she began appearing from the 1999 season premiere until her departure in 2000.

== Creation and development ==
In 1997, following Debra Lawrance's decision to quit her role as Pippa Ross, producers decided to introduce a new family to run the caravan park, because the household was seen as the "centerpiece of the show". They created the Nash family consisting of parents Natalie and Joel Nash, played by Angelica la Bozzetta and David Woodley respectively and children Gypsy (Kimberley Cooper) and Tom (Graeme Squires). The family come to Summer Bay from Hong Kong to start a new life. They made their debuts in the episode broadcast on 18 February 1998.

La Bozzetta quit the role in late 1998 to spend more time with her young daughter, so the producers recast the role to Antoinette Byron. Of the fast turnaround after being cast, Byron stated "It all happened so quickly that I didn't have much time to think about it. I was planning on going back to L.A. on the Saturday and I was offered this job on the Tuesday. Then suddenly I was on set the very next week." Byron admitted to some apprehension about taking over the role, but found the cast quick to welcome her to the show. Speaking about the recast, Byron thought viewers would adapt to a new actor in the role, especially as they make it their own. She that the American soap operas recast roles quite frequently and the public was used to it. Byron made her debut in the 1999 season premiere.

After 18 months in the role, Byron exited the serial in early 2000. Her final scenes aired in May, along with Sara Mumcu's who played Rachel McGregor. Byron stated "Everything about Home and Away has been terrific. I've made some wonderful friends, and I will really miss them." On-screen, Natalie makes the decision to leave Summer Bay following her affair, pregnancy reveal and attempted reconciliation with Joel. Byron explained that while Joel has forgiven Natalie, she knows that life can never be the same again and believes he will end up resenting her child. She decides to leave with Rachel, whom she is caring for while Rachel's father Jesse McGregor (Ben Unwin) is in prison. Byron described the moment Natalie says goodbye to Gypsy in the rain as "very emotional."

Byron reprised the role six months later in October 2000 to help facilitate Woodley's departure from the show. Her character's return occurs shortly after the Bay is hit by a landslide, in which Joel is injured. She also brings her infant son Connor Nash with her. Of Natalie's reasons for returning, Byron told Jason Herbison of TV Week: "Natalie has never stopped loving Joel – he's been on her mind since she left town. She made one mistake – having the affair with Glen – and she's been paying for it ever since. But now she's back. She wants to right the wrong and bring the Nash family back together." Byron reckoned Natalie was waiting for the opportunity to come back, and with Joel in the hospital, she decides the time is right and she comes to tell him how much she cares about him. However, when she arrives, she realises she has "competition". Following Natalie's departure, producers gave Joel a new love interest in the form of Judith Ackroyd (Anna Hruby). Byron told Herbison that Natalie is aware of the relationship, as Gypsy has kept her up to date, but it is "awkward" for her as Judith was her friend. She explained: "Natalie doesn't see Judith as being her enemy and she doesn't want to confront her. Instead, she quietly sets out to prove to Joel that they belong together." Gypsy helps her mother by trying to convince Joel to give Natalie a second chance, and he shares a "tender moment" with Connor when they are left alone together. After Joel learns that he cannot to return to active police duties for a while, Natalie asks Joel to return to Queensland with her, so she can help him with his recovery, but Judith also plans to move him in with her, so she can take care of him, which leaves Joel with the decision of who to be with.

== Storylines ==
Natalie returns to Summer Bay in early 1998 with her husband Joel and teenage children Tom (Graeme Squires) and Gypsy (Kimberley Cooper). It is revealed that Joel and Natalie's reason for leaving was seventeen years earlier; Joel's father Jack (John Grant) was Natalie's swimming coach who molested her. She soon builds up a friendship with her brother-in-law Travis (Nic Testoni) and his wife Rebecca (Belinda Emmett).

Natalie, a keen sportswoman and enters a local rowing club but an injury forces her to stop competing. She begins training Tom and disapproves of his rivalry with Vinnie Patterson (Ryan Kwanten), telling him the object of a competition is to do his best, not beat one person. She is more accepting of Gypsy's relationship with Will Smith (Zac Drayson) but takes an instant dislike to Tom's girlfriend Sugar O'Donnell (Brooke Gissing). Natalie then takes the job of P.E. teacher vacated by Joel when he rejoins the police force. During this time, She asks Joel to try for another baby but they discover he has a low sperm count and the idea is abandoned.

The family's life is at risk when David D'Angelo (Tony Poli), a criminal who Joel had jailed begins a revenge campaign and kidnaps Gypsy. Natalie is also kidnapped but rescued by Joel and Travis. Gypsy is later found by the police and the family are left homeless when David burns the house down. They move in with Travis and Rebecca at the Caravan Park. When Travis and Rebecca leave for Canada, They take over the house and assume responsibility for Justine Welles (Bree Desborough) and Peta Janossi.

When Gypsy begins seeing Jesse McGregor (Ben Unwin), a series of misunderstandings lead to many Bay residents, notably Alf and Marilyn Fisher, mistakenly believing that Natalie and Jesse are having an affair. When Natalie finally finds out about the rumours, she finds the idea hilarious. Natalie is then caught up in Jesse's stolen car drama and is asked to look after his daughter, Rachel (Sarah Mumcu) while he goes on the run. Joel is annoyed when he finds out Natalie has contacted Jesse and makes a report to his superiors.

Shortly after Natalie visits her mother in Queensland, she discovers she is pregnant. Colleen Smart (Lyn Collingwood) begins spreading rumours that Joel is not the father; which turn out to be true. While in Queensland, Natalie had an affair with an old friend, Glen Tanner (Craig Elliot), who then follows her to the Bay. Although Natalie is not interested in picking things up, Gypsy spots them holding hands in a cafe and jumps to conclusions. Gypsy is later in a car crash, in which her boyfriend Charlie Nicholas (Toby Schmitz) is killed. The Guilt of Natalie's affair gets to her and she confesses all to Joel. They try to salvage the marriage; but they cannot and Natalie leaves for Queensland, taking Rachel with her.

Natalie gives birth to a son, Connor Nash (Connor Smith; McKenzie Roberts) and Joel is angry when he discovers she has given him the surname Nash. Some months later, when Joel has his leg partially crushed during a mudslide, Natalie returns with Connor. Even though Joel is now involved with Judith Ackroyd (Anna Hruby), Natalie offers to care for him in Queensland during his recovery. Joel refuses and Natalie decides leaving town when Judith drives an unknowing Joel to the house, having realised where his heart really lies. Joel and Natalie reconciled but Natalie felt people in the Bay would have a hard time accepting her and Connor so persuades Joel to go back to Queensland with her. She invites Gypsy but she decides to stay in the Bay, being among the group waving her parents off. Gypsy follows a year later with Will in tow and they marry with the family present.

== Reception ==
Herald Sun critic Jackie Brygel observed that the character "has never been a shrinking violet". In May 2000, Brygel commented on the state of Natalie's marriage, saying "Joel and Natalie, a typical Summer Bay couple who have had their ups and downs, are going through something of a down phase. This, in case you've missed the past few episodes, is very likely because Nat had a brief affair and, oh yeah, fell pregnant to her lover." Ahead of the character's departure, Brygel was surprised, writing "It's not often that something truly unexpected happens in Summer Bay. But, here at Soapdish, we like to give credit where credit's due and, therefore, we feel obliged to hand it to the writers of this show this week. Natalie finally reveals her plans to her family – she is going to live in Queensland. And we thought it was only ex-Ramsay Streeters who left the world of soap to live in the Sunshine State."

Channel 5 chose the episode where Natalie and Joel return to Summer Bay with their children, Tom and Gypsy, as one of their best episodes from the last 25 years of the serial.
