= Joel Nash =

- Home and Away character
- Portrayed by: David E. Woodley; Kameron Blight (flashback)
- Duration: 1998–2000
- First appearance: 18 February 1998
- Last appearance: 11 October 2000
In-universe information
- Occupation: Teacher; Police officer
- Father: Jack Nash
- Brothers: Travis Nash
- Half-brothers: David Andrews
- Half-sisters: Claire Andrews
- Wife: Natalie Collins
- Sons: Tom Nash
- Daughters: Gypsy Nash
- Granddaughters: Lily Smith

Joel Nash is a fictional character from the Australian soap opera Home and Away played by David E. Woodley. Joel made his first appearance on 18 February 1998 and departed on 11 October 2000.

== Creation and casting ==
In 1997, after Debra Lawrance quit her role as Pippa Ross, producers decided to introduce a new family to run the caravan park, because the household was seen as the "centrepiece of the show". They created the Nash family consisting of parents Joel and Natalie, played by Woodley and Angelica la Bozzetta respectively, and children Gypsy (Kimberley Cooper) and Tom (Graeme Squires). The family come to Summer Bay from Hong Kong to start a new life. They would not actually take over the running of the caravan park until the middle of 1999, over a year later.

Before taking on the role of Joel, Woodley previously guested on the serial as Finlay Roberts' (Tina Thomsen) partner Barry, in 1996.

== Storylines ==
Joel returns with his family to Summer Bay after seventeen years away. He has an uncomfortable reunion with his younger brother Travis (Nic Testoni), who had never understood why Joel had suddenly disappeared one day. Joel reveals to Travis that their father Jack (John Grant) had been sexually harassing Natalie while working as her swimming coach. The two brothers agree to put the past behind them and rebuild their relationship. Joel takes a job working as a PE teacher at Summer Bay High and frequently clashes with Will Smith (Zac Drayson), who Gypsy begins dating. However he later softens his attitude toward Will and encourages him to join the school javelin team. Joel soon quits teaching and rejoins the police force. Prior to acceptance, Joel helps Donald Fisher (Norman Coburn) uncover the identity of his wife Marilyn's blackmailers as her friend Chantel (Toni Moran) and her boyfriend Eddie (Tim McCunn). Joel's next encounter with the police is less rewarding after going on a fishing trip with Don, Travis and Alf Stewart (Ray Meagher) where a prowler is on the loose, It turns out to be Vinnie Patterson (Ryan Kwanten) who has followed them but they manage to convince him there is a genuine prowler. However, Vinnie calls the police and the foursome are left answering some awkward questions.

When Natalie suggests having another baby, Joel agrees, and after the family vote on the subject, Tom supports them. However, when they fail to conceive, Natalie suggests they have tests and Joel learns he has a low sperm count, making it unlikely he will have more children. Joel and Natalie then focus on the children they have by hiring Robert Perez (Tony Poli) as a tutor for Gypsy, with Joel unaware that he is actually an old acquaintance, David D'Angelo. It emerges Joel had arrested David in Hong Kong years ago, and he takes revenge on the family by kidnapping Natalie and Gypsy, then burning the family home to the ground. David is then arrested and jailed. Left homeless, the family move in with Travis and his wife Rebecca (Belinda Emmett) at the caravan park. They try to buy a new house, but are devastated to learn David has cleaned out the account after impersonating Joel. The stress gets to Joel when he lashes out at a Heckler at one of Tom's cricket matches and nearly lashes out at Tom later. Worse is to come when he is accused of breaking a thief's arm and consequently suspended, but the enquiry reveals the boy's injuries are inconsistent and Joel is cleared. More family dramas ensue when Travis tracks down a woman named Claire Andrews (Kate Beaham), who is revealed to be their half-sister, a result of an affair Jack had. Claire steals from Travis, and Joel insists on having her charged, but Travis decides not to.

Joel and Natalie take over the park when Travis and Rebecca move to Canada, and they take over the care of Justine Welles (Bree Desborough) and Peta Janossi (Aleetza Wood). David returns after fleeing jail, looking for the stolen money. Ironically, Joel saves his life when he nearly falls to his death. David then hits Joel with a rock and makes a bogus assault claim, but these allegations are dismissed. Joel then uncovers Jesse McGregor's (Ben Unwin) involvement in a stole car racket. A high speed chase ensues and a big car accident happens. Jesse pulls Joel from the wreck of his car and handcuffs Mick. Joel agrees to let Jesse go after threatening to shoot him. He and Natalie then find themselves caring for Jesse's daughter Rachel, while Jesse flees town.

Natalie falls pregnant, and rumours begin circulating that Joel isn't the father because of his earlier problems. Joel defends her vigorously until he learns the rumours were true: Natalie has indeed been having an affair with an old friend, Glen Tanner (Craig Elliot), on a trip to see her mother in Queensland. The couple try to move past it, but during an attempted reconciliation dinner, Natalie feels the baby kick and Joel reacts badly. Natalie decides Joel will never accept her or the baby and moves to Queensland with Rachel. Soon after, Tom leaves, and Joel's relationship with Gypsy hits an all-time low.

After the Caravan park is sold, Joel and Gypsy move into his old family home, which Travis still owns and where Vinnie is living. Relations between Joel and Gypsy worsen due to his mistrust of her relationship with Harry Reynolds (Justin Melvey), which proves correct when the pair begin dating. Joel starts seeing Judith Ackroyd (Anna Hruby) and decides to move in with her to give Gypsy some space. Things seem to be going well between them until Judith suggests having a child together. He is against the idea, as they are not married, and is further upset when Judith offers to bring up the baby. During a mudslide that destroys several homes, Joel is on hand to rescue Alf's wife Ailsa (Judy Nunn) and their son Duncan (Brendan McKensy), together with Shauna Bradley (Kylie Watson) and Jade Sutherland (Kate Garven) who are trapped inside. Joel's leg is crushed and he is hospitalised. Natalie returns and offers to care for him in Queensland, but Joel rejects her offer and agrees to stay with Judith. Judith collects Joel from hospital and drives him to see Natalie, knowing it is her he wants to be with. They reconcile and move to Queensland where a year and a half later, they are joined by Will, Gypsy and their newborn daughter Lily.
