= Lachlan Fraser =

- Home and Away character
- Portrayed by: Richard Grieve
- Duration: 1997–1998
- First appearance: 19 March 1997
- Last appearance: 27 November 1998
- Introduced by: John Holmes
In-universe information
- Occupation: Doctor
- Father: Peter Fraser
- Mother: Diana Fraser
- Brothers: Edward Fraser; James Fraser
- Sisters: Elizabeth Fraser
- Wife: Dana (1999)
- Daughters: Olivia Fraser Richards

Lachlan "Lachie" Fraser is a fictional character from the Australian Channel Seven soap opera Home and Away, played by Richard Grieve. He made his screen debut on 19 March 1997 and last appeared on 27 November 1998. He joined the show after previously appearing in rival soap opera Neighbours. Lachlan is introduced as a new doctor working at Summer Bay's local hospital. Grieve had to research the profession and received help from an on-set medical advisor. Lachlan is characterised as a sweet and gentle person who is brilliant at medicine.

During his tenure he strikes up relationships with Shannon Reed (Isla Fisher), Terri Garner (Alyson Standen) and Chloe Richards (Kristy Wright). The latter who becomes pregnant after a one-night stand, Lachlan and Chloe fall in love. She gives birth to a daughter, Olivia. But their relationship is marred by his interfering mother Diana (Kerry McGuire), whom he is unable to stand up to. Grieve decided to leave the show in 1998, which gave producers a dilemma. They had developed the partnership between Lachlan and Chloe in advance. They cast Michael Piccirilli as Lachlan's brother James to take over the relationship with Chloe. Lachlan's exit storyline involved him battling a brain tumour, suffering brain damage after having a cerebral haemorrhage and leaving for treatment in the United States. The character was later killed off-screen.

Grieve was nominated for a Logie Award for portrayal of Lachlan. Reporters from the magazines Inside Soap and Soap Stars have praised the character's sex appeal, while another columnist said he was the show's hero who solved all medical emergencies in Summer Bay.

== Casting ==
In January 1997, it was announced that Richard Grieve had taken on the role of Lachlan. He previously appeared in rival soap opera Neighbours. The actor told Jason Herbison from Inside Soap that "I'm thrilled, I'd been looking for a change for a while, so the chance to [...] start work on a different show is great." Grieve relocated from Melbourne to Sydney for the role. Andrea Jones from The Sun-Herald revealed that his character would be introduced as a new doctor working in Summer Bay's local hospital.

== Development ==
I'm going from being a handyman to a doctor, you couldn't really get much further far removed, could you? It's great playing such a different sort of role.

— Grieve comparing his roles as Sam Kratz and Lachlan. (1997)

Lachlan debuted on-screen on 19 March 1997. His initial scenes depict him taking his new position at the hospital where an established doctor, Kelly Watson (Katrina Hobbs), takes a dislike to him because he is considered more experienced, despite them being equally qualified.

Grieve told Helen Childs from Inside Soap that Lachlan is completely different from Sam. He enjoyed playing a doctor because of the "amazing" experiences it created. The actor had to research the profession before taking the part. He also told Childs that "we have a medical advisor on the show who helps with the medical scenes, and she also arranged for me to go to St Vincent's hospital in Sydney to observe some operations." He is characterised as a sweet, gentle, tall, dark and handsome man. A writer from the official Home and Away website said that Lachlan had a "brilliance" about him. His mother, Diana (Kerry McGuire), likes to meddle in her son's lives. Lachaln tolerates her interfering in his business and does not dare to stand up to her.

Lachlan begins a relationship with Shannon Reed (Isla Fisher), which begins soon after they meet. Grieve has said that filming the scenes with Fisher was never romantic. Their relationship is tested when Lachlan's ex-girlfriend Julia Robson (Natalie McCurry) arrives and attempts to win him back. He decides to choose to be with Shannon and they move in together. Lachlan wants to keep his father, Peter's (Helmut Bakaitis) bisexuality hidden from Shannon. He decides to let Shannon meet her family, but she suspects that he is hiding something. Shannon fails to get the truth from him and it causes relationship problems. Their relationship ultimately fails. Shannon had previously questioned her sexuality after involvement with Mandy Thomas (Rachael Blake) and when she returns, Shannon decides to leave Lachlan because her feelings return. Fisher told Steven Murphy from Inside Soap that "I don't think Shannon and Lachie's relationship is working out [...] although she loves Lachie as a friend, it's not the degree that she loves Mandy." Lachlan realises that Shannon has decided to leave him when he spots her wearing Mandy's ring. Lachlan decides to dump her before she has the chance to end their relationship. Shannon decides to begin a new life in Paris and this leaves Lachlan "heartbroken".

Lachlan sleeps with Chloe Richards (Kristy Wright) and she becomes pregnant. Lachlan begins a relationship with Terri Garner (Alyson Standen) and they get along well. So Chloe tries to deny her feelings for him. Lachlan forgot about his tryst with Chloe, but she knows that the baby is Lachlan's and she decides to tell him. Lachlan and Terri decide to end their romance. Grieve told Steven Murphy from Inside Soap that "when he finds out about Chloe's secret he is totally shocked and confused, which is only natural." But he believed that there was still an obvious attraction between Lachlan and Chloe and slowly, everything begins to piece together. They decide to support each other through the scenario but end up falling in love with each other. But Diana is not happy and tries to keep them apart. Grieve said that "Lachie's got strong morals, so he's not the type of bloke to desert her at the first sign of trouble. I think there is a strong potential for them to become a real happy family." Lachlan supports Chloe through labour, which took more than two weeks to film. Chloe gives birth to a daughter named Olivia. Wright told Murphy that the new parents cannot agree on a name and "end up fighting about it for a week". Off-screen producers decided to let Grieve and Wright chose the baby's name. Working with Wright presented logistical challenges during filming due to their difference in height. Grieve was above six foot in height and when the pair filmed together he had to lean on objects or sit on couches. Wright later revealed that she and Grieve attempted to make Lachlan and Chloe's "love story" unique. She added that the duo "have fun together and aren't too soppy. They wind each other up in a good-natured way, just like I and Richard do in real life."

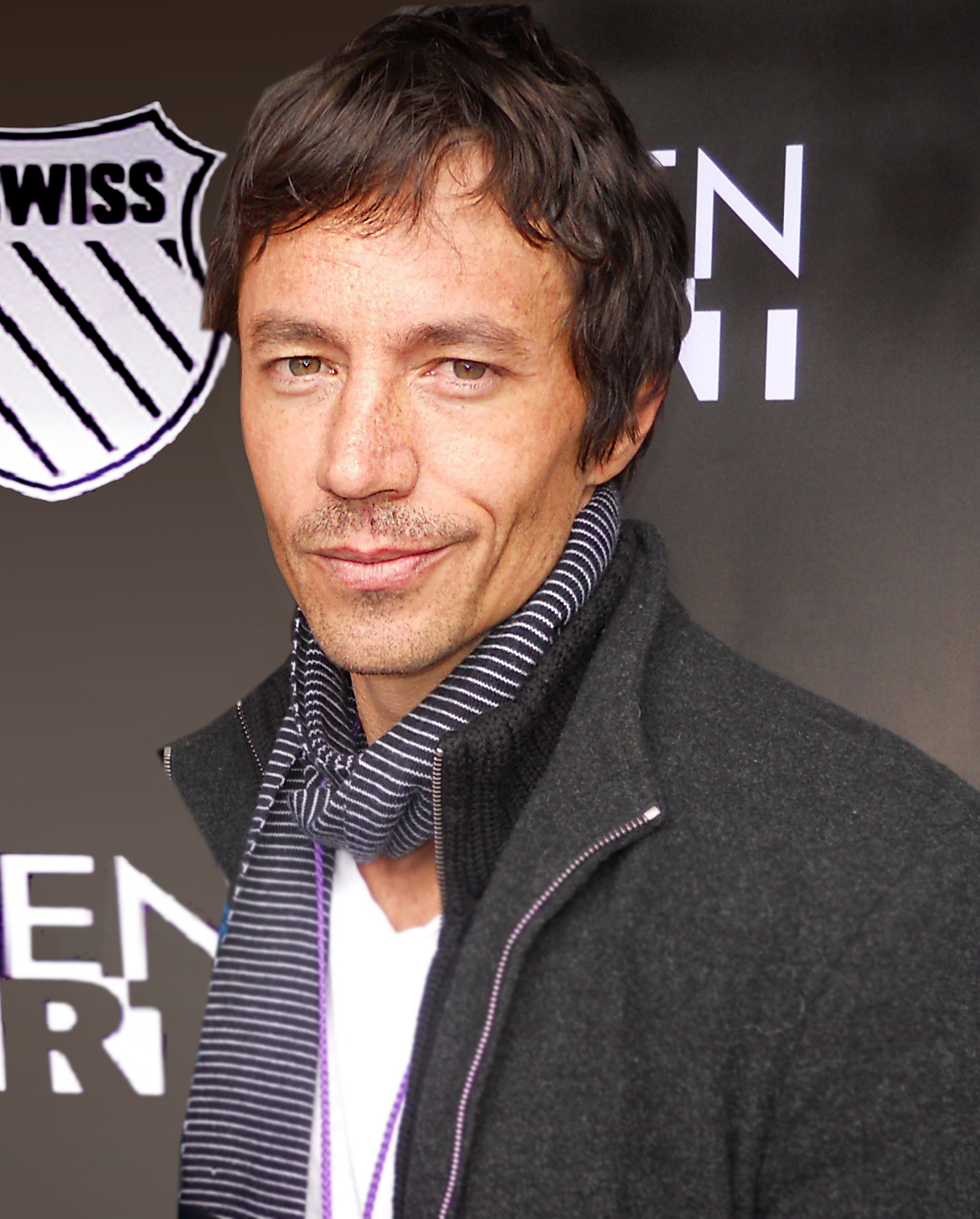
Michael Piccirilli (pictured) plays Lachlan's brother, James Fraser.

In 1998, Grieve decided to leave the show and Lachlan was written out. Inside Soap's Herbison reported that Lachlan's final storyline could see him leave Chloe as a single parent. Lachlan is diagnosed with a brain tumour and has to have life-saving surgery. Lachlan and Chloe love each other and just welcomed their first child. Wright told Inside Soap's Murphy that Chloe's new life with Lachlan appears to be over. She found the scenes in which Chloe stays by Lachlan's bedside emotional and difficult to portray because Grieve was a close friend. Lachlan leaves an upset Chloe and Summer Bay behind to have possible life-saving treatment in the US. In his final episodes, Chloe tracks Lachlan down to a US hospital where he is attempting to recover from his brain tumour. Producers had invested time to develop Lachlan and Chloe's relationship, so they decided to replace the character and continue the storyline. Michael Piccirilli was cast as Lachlan's brother James - a fellow doctor. Piccirilli told Inside Soap's Herbison that "the purpose of my character was to come in and marry the girl who was having my brother's baby." Chloe discovers that Lachlan married another woman and she decides to be with James.

== Storylines ==
Lachlan is at work at the Northern Districts Hospital when he consoles an upset Shannon. He invites her to the hospital ball and Shannon accepts. When a storm causes as blackout in Summer Bay, Lachlan attends to a shipwreck and clashes with Kelly Watson, the doctor he is replacing. Lachie moves in with Kelly's ex-boyfriend Travis Nash (Nic Testoni) and Jesse McGregor (Ben Unwin) and befriends student nurse Selina Roberts (Tempany Deckert). Lachlan continues dating Shannon and takes her to meet his family. He is upset to learn that his parents Peter and Diana are separating. Shannon acts uncomfortable around Lachlan and when Mandy arrives in Summer Bay it is revealed that Shannon has feelings for her. Lachlan asks Shannon to marry him, but she opts to be with Mandy and leaves for Paris.

Lachlan is upset and has sex with Chloe, but they agree that it was a one-night stand. Chloe becomes to victim of a hate campaign led by Brad Cooper (Bruce Samazan) and Karen Williams (Anna Brionoswski). He decides to offer Chloe support through her ordeal. Lachlan begins dating Terri and when he discovers that Chloe is pregnant, he assumes that Jesse is the father. Terri ends their relationship and Lachlan discovers that Chloe is carrying his child. He decides to stand by Chloe, but Diana is annoyed and attempts to keep them apart. She uses Chloe's previous addiction to amphetamines to blackmail her. Irene Roberts (Lynne McGranger) records a conversation between Diana and Chloe and gives Lachlan a copy. He tells Diana to leave them alone and the pair decide to start a relationship. They enjoy their romance and move in together. Chloe goes into labour and she has a daughter.

Unfortunately Lachlan and Chloe's happiness is short lived, as soon after Olivia's birth Lachlan begins suffering from a persistent headache and agrees to go for a check-up. He is diagnosed with a brain tumour and forced to have surgery, and while the surgery is initially successful Lachlan later suffers a cerebral haemorrhage which leaves him in a coma. When he regains consciousness he has brain damage and is left unable to fully move or communicate. He becomes depressed and annoyed with Chloe and Diana's arguments over his care. Chloe attempts to be his carer; but Diana tempts Lachlan into leaving for the United States to receive professional treatment. He leaves Chloe behind, but some time later she plans a surprise visit. She and Olivia arrive in the US to find Lachlan's speech and movement have improved, but he is now living with a new lover, Dana. Chloe leaves and is upset to learn that he has since married Dana. Lachie dies when he suffers another haemorrhage and a memorial service is held in Summer Bay.

== Reception ==
For his portrayal of Lachlan, Grieve was nominated for the "Most Popular Actor" award at the 1998 Logie Awards. The episode featuring Lachlan's departure was nominated for the "Best Episode in a Television Serial" accolade at the 1998 AFI awards. The following year an episode featuring Lachlan's memorial service gained a nomination in the same category. A reporter from Inside Soap said that Lachlan was a "dreamboat" and that Grieve was popular in Home and Away than he was in Neighbours. A writer for Soap Stars said that Lachlan was the show's "dishiest doc". An Inside Soap critic observed Lachlan as able to carry out all forms of medicine. After "delivering babies, removing appendixes, locating toxic chemicals in creeks", they began to think that he was the only doctor at the hospital. They concluded that "he appears to be available all day, every day for those Summer Bay disasters, yet always finds some time to pop round for a cuppa to see how you're doing. Our Hero!."
