= Tom Nash (Home and Away) =

Fictional character from the Australian soap opera Home and Away

- Home and Away character
- Portrayed by: Graeme Squires
- Duration: 1998–2001
- First appearance: 18 February 1998
- Last appearance: 16 May 2001
- Introduced by: John Holmes (1998); Russell Webb (2001)
In-universe information
- Occupation: Student (1998–99); Deckhand
- Father: Joel Nash
- Mother: Natalie Nash
- Sisters: Gypsy Nash
- Half-brothers: Connor Nash
- Grandfathers: Jack Nash
- Uncles: Travis Nash; David Andrews
- Aunts: Claire Andrews
- Nieces: Lily Smith

Thomas "Tom" Nash is a fictional character from the Australian soap opera Home and Away, played by Graeme Squires. He made his first screen appearance during the episode broadcast on 18 February 1998. Tom was introduced to Home and Away along with his family. Zac Drayson was originally cast in the role, but when the producers thought he would be more suitable for Will Smith, Squires received the part. The actor decided to leave Home and Away in early 2000 after two years and he made his screen exit on 16 May 2000. Squires returned to film the show's 3,000th episode special in 2001.

Tom was described as a sporty, good-looking guy, with an eye for the ladies. Squires called Tom "a very down-to-earth teenager who simply wants to find his own way in life." Tom liked to please his parents, although there was often tension between him and his father, who had high expectations for him. Tom became involved in a "shocking" relationship with local policewoman Terri Garner (Alyson Standen; Amelia Longhurst), who was much older than him. He later dated Justine Welles (Bree Desborough) and competed with his friend Vinnie Patterson (Ryan Kwanten) for Leah Poulos' (Ada Nicodemou) affections.

== Creation and casting ==
Following Debra Lawrance's (Pippa Ross) departure in 1997, producers decided to introduce a new family to take over the Fletcher household, which was seen as the "centrepiece of the show". The Nash family, which had four members – Joel (David Woodley), Natalie (Angelica la Bozzetta), Gypsy (Kimberley Cooper) and Tom (Squires) – arrived in Summer Bay from Hong Kong. Zac Drayson was originally cast in the role of Tom, but the producers later thought he would be more suited to the "rougher" role of Will Smith. Squires was then cast as Tom and he revealed that he was honoured to be a part of the Home and Away crew. He told Jason Herbison of All About Soap that the best thing to happen to him was getting the part of Tom. He explained "I had done some modelling before, but Home and Away was definitely my first big acting break. It's what people know me for and I'm very grateful that I was given the role."

In April 2000, an All About Soap writer revealed that Squires had decided to leave Home and Away after two years. The writer stated that Squires would film his final scenes in the coming weeks and that little was known about how his character would make his exit. Tom departed on 16 May 2000. The actor returned the following year for the 3,000th episode special. Producers wanted to bring him back full-time, but when Squires was charged with alleged sexual offences; they decided against reintroducing Tom.

== Development ==
=== Characterisation ===
A writer for the official Home and Away website described Tom as "your typical cricket-in-summer, rugby-in-winter kind of guy; he's sporty, good-looking and a bit of a ladies' man!" Unlike Gypsy, Tom was not against his family moving from Hong Kong to Summer Bay, as he was hoping the move would answer some questions he had about his father's past. Tom and Joel's relationship was a little strained and things were not helped by Joel's high expectations for his son. However, pleasing his parents was important to Tom, although he did not admit that out loud. The website writer observed that Tom managed to slip into the Bay's lifestyle easily and became "an instant hit" with the girls. Squires described Tom as "a very down-to-earth teenager who simply wants to find his way in life." When asked if he shared any similarities with his character, Squires stated that they were both creative and liked the outdoors. He added that Tom is more outgoing, while he is much more quieter.

=== Relationships ===
Tom meets local policewoman Terri Garner (Alyson Standen) while he is on the beach and it is "love at first sight" for them both. Tom tells Terri that he is twenty-one and at university, when in reality he is a sixteen-year-old school student and the son of her boss, Joel. Inside Soap's Steven Murphy reported that Standen and Squires relished the chance to "add a bit of spice" to their character's lives. He also revealed that the actors had no trouble with the age gap between them when it came to the more intimate scenes involving Terri and Tom. Squires stated "The kissing scenes were easy. Once you get to know the person and get over any inhibitions, you feel comfortable and it's absolutely fine." Terri flees Summer Bay when her affair with Tom is exposed.

Tom becomes "a hero" of Summer Bay following a win at a cricket match, and he has to deal with a lot of attention from the local girls. Squires admitted that he was quite shy, so he found it difficult to get into character, plus he had never been in a position of having to fight off women before. Tom's new "sex symbol status" helps him win the heart of his crush Justine Welles (Bree Desborough). Squires explained "Justine saves him from a girl who is following him around. They start to get on very well and it rolls into a relationship - it just sort of happens." The actor added that while everything is going well for Tom, the return of his "first true love" Terri would put him in a situation where he has to choose between her and Justine. Squires added that things were going to get messy for a while.

Terri (now played by Amelia Longhurst) returns to declare her love for Tom as she has not been able to get rid of her feelings for him. Tom is shocked to see her back, but he reunites with her, which causes a number of arguments with his family. Longhurst stated "There are a lot of older men going out with younger women, and people don't have a problem with that. This story is shocking because it's the other way round, but I don't think that makes it wrong." The actress added that there was a genuine love between Terri and Tom. The couple later move in together and Tom leaves school. Terri persuades Tom to consider his future and when they fall out because he does not like her friends, they break up. Soaplife's Tina Baker commented that "Tom's immaturity caused the final rift."

Tom goes head to head with his friend and housemate, Vinnie Patterson (Ryan Kwanten), for Leah Poulos' (Ada Nicodemou) affections. An All About Soap columnist wrote that neither boy seemed to be able to resist Leah's charms and they quickly find themselves fighting for her. Tom invites Leah to stay with him and Vinnie and he later asks her out, telling his friend to back off. However, Leah reveals that she is actually interested in Vinnie.

== Storylines ==
Tom arrives in the Bay with his family when they arrive from Hong Kong. Gypsy falls over while rollerblading and is helped up by Travis Nash (Nic Testoni), he accuses him of being the local pervert. Joel quickly reveals that Travis is their uncle. Tom later bonds with Travis after he and Joel iron out their differences. Tom finds himself up against Vinnie in the local triathlon but loses. He later joins Aaron Welles (Ritchie Gudgeon) and Joey Rainbow (Alex O'Han) in a band called the "Chick Magnets", managed by Vinnie and find themselves opposite "The Broken Dolls" a band composed of Gypsy, Justine and Tiegan Brook (Sally Marrett), The two bands later merge to form "The Broken Magnets"

Tom's first taste of romance comes in the form of Sugar O'Donnell (Brooke Gissing) but it is short-lived when she dumps him for Ben (Tony Gibson), the lead singer of a band. Tom then turns his attentions to Terri Garner, a policewoman and lies about his age to her. This causes friction at home as Joel works with Terri and Tom moves out temporarily to live with her. However, due to the age gap the relationship fizzles out and Terri leaves bay. Justine takes an interest in Tom and they become an item. He stands by her when she is facing jail for the death of Ruby Collins, a toddler she babysat. After the HSC results arrive, Justine wants to pursue acting and moves to the city and ends things with Tom, leaving him heartbroken. When Leah begins staying with Tom and Vinnie; both make a play for her but Leah prefers Vinnie.

While working on Travis' boat one day, Tom encounters Gilly Austen (Sarah Aubrey) who has been stowing away and they begin a relationship and get engaged, much to Joel's chagrin. It soon emerges that Gilly is using Tom as a means to avoid deportation back to her home country of the United Kingdom in order to stay with her boyfriend Rory (Justin Cotta), who Tom finds staying over one day when he visits. Tom then ends things with Gilly and after failing to run a charter boat business due to Joel's refusal to help, he leaves Summer Bay to go travelling then settles in Queensland near Natalie. Several months later, Tom returns to serve as Vinnie's best man at his wedding to Leah. During this visit, he shares a kiss with Sally Fletcher (Kate Ritchie) but nothing develops and he supports Gypsy over her feelings for Will and the revelation she is pregnant, before leaving again.

== Reception ==
For his portrayal of Tom, Squires earned a nomination for Most Popular New Male Talent at the Logie Awards of 1999. Robin Oliver of The Sydney Morning Herald called Tom and Gypsy "good-looking children". Inside Soap's Murphy said Tom and Terri's relationship was the hottest romance of the lot. Claire Brand and Annette Dasey of the same publication called Tom "the darling of Summer Bay", while Soaplife's Tina Baker branded the character "tasty Tom".

== Sources ==
- Mercado, Andrew (2004). Super Aussie Soaps. Pluto Press Australia. ISBN 978-1-86403-191-1.
