= Travis Nash =

- Home and Away character
- Portrayed by: Nic Testoni
- Duration: 1995–1999
- First appearance: 10 April 1995
- Last appearance: 11 August 1999
- Introduced by: John Holmes
In-universe information
- Occupation: Boat worker Foster father
- Father: Jack Nash
- Brothers: Joel Nash
- Half-brothers: David Andrews
- Half-sisters: Claire Andrews
- Wife: Rebecca Fisher (1997–)
- Nephews: Tom Nash
- Nieces: Gypsy Nash
- Other relatives: Lily Smith

Travis Nash is a fictional character from the Australian soap opera Home and Away, played by actor Nic Testoni. He made his first appearance on 10 April 1995 and departed on 11 August 1999.

== Development ==
In late December 1994, TV Week's David Brown confirmed Testoni had been signed for a 12-week role, with filming to begin in January. Brown reported that his character, Travis, is "a drifter" who, after arriving in Summer Bay, would decide to stay on. Testoni made his first appearance in April 1995.

Testoni began his career as a model, but he found working on Home and Away to be more enjoyable because he was acting alongside people of a similar age. He commented, "It's good fun on the set – it's more like a play group than anything!" His character Travis is introduced as a witness to the death of Laura Bonnetti (Claudia Buttazonni), who was playing chicken on the railway with Curtis Reed (Shane Ammann). With Curtis "struck dumb" by the incident, Travis speaks with the police. It emerges that Travis has lived in Summer Bay all his life, but he rarely ventures off his fishing boat to go into the town. Travis soon becomes a familiar face in the Bay, but instead of hanging out in the Diner, he is happiest when he is alone on his boat. Serene Coneeley of Inside Soap stated that he is "no smooth sophisticate but his rugged good looks make up for his lack of social graces". She thought he would be a favourite among the serial's female viewers. Testoni said he shared many similarities with his character, including their laid-back attitudes. Testoni continued "He isn't really a people person, but he gradually immerses himself in the community." A reporter from Inside Soap described Travis as having "surfer locks and a golden tan". While another branded him "easygoing" and "happy-go-lucky".

Travis provides support for Curtis in the wake of Laura's death and soon becomes popular with the Bay's other residents. Writers gave him a love interest in the form of Donna Bishop (Nicola Quilter), who has just broken up with her partner Andrew Warren (Adrian Lee). Testoni told Coneeley: "They get involved when Donna moves in with him to escape her awful relationship with Andrew and things develop from there." However, the characters' romance was cut short when Testoni quit Home and Away after three months. Producers quickly asked him to return and he agreed. Testoni explained that on-screen, Travis goes away on a long fishing trip, while he enjoyed the time off to catch up on sleep. He joked that he wanted Travis to be eaten by a shark, so that he could come back as his evil twin.

When Kelly Watson (Katrina Hobbs) spotted a melanoma on his back, Travis realised that he had been spending too much time in the sun. After undergoing tests, Travis was told that he had to have the tumour surgically removed to stop it from spreading. Kelly was worried for Travis, as his uncle had died from a melanoma. The surgery was a success, but Travis began spending more time alone, which made Kelly feel like she was being shut out.

== Storylines ==
Travis is the younger of two sons, born to Jack Nash (John Grant) and his wife in 1971. Travis attended the local high school with Donna Bishop, whom he dated, Rob Storey (Matthew Lilley) and Steven Matheson (Adam Willits). After leaving High School, Travis began working in Somalia and met Kibiri Mboto and they began a relationship. Kibiri was later shot and killed. Travis arranged for Kibiri's younger sister, Stephanie (Fleur Beaupert), to be smuggled out of the country and he returned to Australia.

Travis is a witness to Laura Bonnetti's death, after she and her boyfriend, Curtis Reed, play on some railway tracks. Travis comforts a distraught Curtis and supports him when he descends into alcoholism. While back in the bay, Travis reconnects with his old friends Donna and Rob. Travis and Donna rekindle their relationship, after Donna dumps her violent boyfriend Andrew Warren. They later leave for Canada on a whale-watching trip. Several months later, Travis returns after breaking off his engagement with Donna and moves back into his house to find two new tenants, local doctor Kelly Watson and old schoolfriend Steven.

Travis and Steven compete for Kelly's affections and Travis wins. When Kelly suffers a scare at the hospital after treating an HIV-positive patient, Travis stands by her. Stephanie arrives and Travis and Kelly become her guardians. When Stephanie dies after a cliff fall, Travis is distraught as he promised Kibiri he would always look after her.

Travis asks Kelly's father for her hand in marriage and the couple become engaged. Kelly receives a promotion at a city hospital and she realises that Travis is not cut out for city life and they part. Travis rents his house out to Kelly's replacement at Northern Districts hospital, Lachlan Fraser (Richard Grieve) and Jesse McGregor (Ben Unwin). Travis falls for Rebecca Fisher (Belinda Emmett) and they marry in a ceremony on the beach, with Rebecca's father, Donald (Norman Coburn), presiding as the celebrant.

When Pippa Ross (Debra Lawrance) and her new partner Ian Routledge (Patrick Dickson) leave Summer Bay, Travis and Rebecca take over the tenancy at Summer Bay House and the Caravan Park. They look after Pippa's remaining foster children; Sam Marshall (Ryan Clark, Tiegan Brook (Sally Marrett) and Justine Welles (Bree Desborough. Pippa's adoptive daughter, Sally (Kate Ritchie), begins to feel that the Nashes are forcing her out of her own home. After coming to an agreement, Sally moves into Travis' house with Jesse and Vinnie Patterson (Ryan Kwanten).

Travis' brother Joel (David Woodley), his wife, Natalie (Antoinette Byron), and their children Gypsy (Kimberley Cooper) and Tom (Graeme Squires), move to Summer Bay after Joel takes a position at Yabbie Creek Police Station. Joel and Travis are initially frosty to one another as Joel had disappeared seventeen years earlier without a word. He tells Travis that their father had made unwanted sexual advances towards Natalie and the two brothers reconcile. When Joel, Natalie and the kids are left homeless after a confrontation with Robert Perez (Toni Poli), Travis and Rebecca invite them to move in.

Travis discovers his father had another family and meets his half-sister, Claire Andrews (Kate Beaham), who is resentful that Travis inherited Jack's house and business and she begins stealing from him. Joel suggests Travis presses charges, but he refuses to. Travis and Rebecca jump at the chance of work on a tall ship and leave Summer Bay quietly, after Joel and Natalie agree to take care of the house and Justine and Peta Janossi (Aleetza Wood). Travis and Rebecca set up home in Canada and a couple of years later, Donald reveals that they have had a son together.

== Reception ==
For his portrayal of Travis, Testoni won the "Most Popular New Talent" Logie Award in 1996. A year later, Testoni was nominated for "Most Popular Actor". In 1998, Travis and Rebecca were named "Best Couple" at the Inside Soap Awards. They received a nomination in the same category the following year.

Judy Johnson of The Sun-Herald branded Travis a "dreamboat fisherman." While Serene Coneeley from Inside Soap called him "the hunky hermit". Matt Condon of The Sun-Herald referred to Travis in his article about "dumb" Male characters on television. He opined "Travis' rampant stupidity keeps upsetting the balance. He loves Kelly, but can't understand why she has to work such long hours. Hello? She's a doctor, right?"
