= James Fraser (Home and Away) =

- Home and Away character
- Portrayed by: Sam Meikle (1997); Michael Piccirilli (1998–2000, 2005)
- Duration: 1997–2000, 2005
- First appearance: 1 July 1997
- Last appearance: 27 July 2005
- Introduced by: John Holmes (1997); Julie McGuaran (2005)
In-universe information
- Occupation: Doctor
- Father: Peter Fraser
- Mother: Diana Fraser
- Brothers: Edward Fraser; Lachlan Fraser
- Sisters: Elizabeth Fraser
- Wife: Chloe Richards (1999–2000)
- Nieces: Olivia Fraser

James Fraser is a fictional character from the Australian Channel Seven soap opera Home and Away. The character debuted on-screen on 1 July 1997. Sam Meikle played the character for one episode. When Richard Grieve quit his role as James' brother Lachlan Fraser; producers cast Michael Piccilliri to play James. They had invested time in Lachlan's relationship with Chloe Richards (Kristy Wright) and wanted to replace the character. James soon begins a relationship with Chloe. Producers were pleased with his performance and invited him to join the show's regular cast.

Like Lachlan, James is portrayed as a doctor employed at the local hospital. Piccilliri has described James as an individual who balances his career with his social life. He is also addicted to love and his relationship with Chloe is problematic. The duo marry, but soon separate. Piccilliri quit Home and Away in 1999 and departed on 5 April 2000. His exit storyline played out James departing Summer Bay after realising that Chloe does not love him. The actor briefly reprised the role in 2005 following Chloe's death.

== Creation and casting ==
James appears in an episode (played by Sam Meikle) in which he helps his brother Lachlan (Richard Grieve) hide a family secret from his girlfriend Shannon Reed (Isla Fisher). In 1998, Grieve decided to leave Home and Away. Lachlan has a relationship with Chloe Richards (Kristy Wright). Producers had invested much time into developing their storylines and wanted them to continue. They decided to reintroduce James and paired him with Chloe instead. But the role was recast and Michael Piccirilli won the role. He told Jason Herbison from Inside Soap that "the purpose of my character was to come in and marry the girl who was having my brother's baby." Piccirilli was modelling in London when he submitted a screen test videotape to series producer Russell Webb. He thought that Piccirilli was perfect for the role and arranged a meeting with him. The actor travelled to Sydney and secured the role. It was Piccirilli's first television role and he viewed it as an "amazing opportunity and experience". The character was officially promoted to the regular cast on 15 October 1998. Herbison reported that producers initiated the return because Piccirilli had proved a "big hit" for the show.

== Development ==
A writer from the serial's official website said that an upper-class upbringing, James is an "easygoing and likeable" person. His mother, Diana (Kerry McGuire), enjoys interfering in her children's personal lives. But unlike Lachlan, James is likely to stand up to her and refuses to tolerate her interfering. When James arrived in the show he was immediately put to work treating fellow characters in need. Piccirilli told Herbison that he treated just about everyone in Summer Bay. He added "I had to learn lots of medical jargon, although there was a nurse on set which made it easier". Picirrilli has claimed that he is similar to his character. He told Wendy Granditer of Inside Soap that "James loves nature and the outdoors and so do I. But the main similarity between us is that he doesn't necessarily want to put his career before his life. He tends to give them both equal balance. We're both addicted to love, too."

On James’ arrival he is attracted to Chloe, the mother of Lachie’s daughter, Olivia. He knows Chloe still loves Lachie and tries to fight his feelings for her but soon falls for her. As Inside Soap's Herbison wrote, James had been insistent that he only wanted to support Chloe; but he ends up declaring his love. Grieve had agreed to reprise his role as Lachlan to accommodate the development of their relationship. James gives Chloe a ticket to visit Lachlan and resolve her feelings. The actor said told Annette Dasey from Inside Soap that he sympathised with James because he had been through a similar experience. Chloe discovers that Lachlan married another woman and she decides to be with James. Piccirilli believed that James and Chloe's romance was popular with viewers. On one occasion the actor was out in public with his girlfriend and a female viewer started shouting at him. She believed in the couple so much that she accused Piccirilli of being unfaithful to Chloe. James and Chloe's wedding was broadcast in March 1999. James nearly cancels the ceremony, suspecting that Chloe has a photograph of Lachlan in her locket. But Chloe reveals that it contains James' picture and they marry. The episodes featuring the wedding were filmed over two days. Piccirilli decided to wear his own Prada suit for the occasion. Wright told Steven Murphy from Inside Soap that Chloe's decision to marry James was a mistake. She was surprised that her character would marry a man she did not love. She added "I'd warn Chloe strongly against going through with it and I'm sure viewers would agree with me." Chloe does not love James as much as she did Lachlan, but she thinks that James can offer Olivia a stable and life. Wright opined that the couple do not have the "special something", but Chloe believes that it could happen. Wright said that the shock from James stopping the ceremony to confront her about her locket nearly kills her character with humiliation.

In November 1999, Herbison reported that Piccirilli had left Home and Away to go travelling. James exit storyline depicted him leaving Summer Bay when he realised that Chloe did not love him. The actor was happy with James' material because he got to do "some good dramatic stuff", despite only filming for eighteen months. Asked if he would return in 2004, the actor said "if I went back now, I'd be doing something I've already done. What would be the point?" But Piccirilli returned to the show in 2005. His return storyline features him returning to Summer Bay to gain custody of Olivia.

== Storylines ==
James is first seen at a family lunch at his parents’ house when Lachie brings his girlfriend Shannon to meet the family. James reappears the following year when he takes a position at Northern District's hospital. James uses this position to get closer to Chloe, the mother of Lachlan's daughter, Olivia. Chloe is suspicious of him at first and accuses of him being a spy for his mother, Diana but he assures her is not. He leaves to start his own practice in the country but returns several months later. James takes in an interest in Chloe but she is not over Lachie. He gives her a ticket to visit Lachie in America for Thanksgiving but when Chloe arrives she finds Lachie with a new partner, Dana and is heartbroken.

James comforts Chloe when she returns and they grow closer together and he helps her with Olivia. After Olivia is treated for a heart murmur and recovers following a successful surgery, James and Chloe become a couple but are faced with the interference of Diana, who does not like Chloe. Diana continues playing mind games but the couple, make plans to marry. On the day of the wedding, James begins to have doubts as Chloe admits she still loves Lachie, and he leaves her at the altar but returns and they marry. However, The marriage quickly begins to show signs of strain when James wants a child of his own with Chloe but she is against the idea. She initially agrees but begins secretly taking contraceptive pills. James is enraged by the lies and they briefly separate. Chloe is keen to make the marriage work but following Lachie's death and Chloe's admission she never loved James the way she loved Lachie, things pass the point of no return for the couple. Diana schemes to gain custody of Olivia but ultimately fails and has a breakdown as a result. Chloe leaves but she and James agree to remain friends

Following Chloe's departure, James begins taking in tenants Shauna Bradley (Kylie Watson), Adam Cameron (Mat Stevenson) and later Harry Reynolds (Justin Melvey). He also enjoys romantic attention from Danielle McCarthy (Claire Parradine) and nurse Juliette Bellati (Nicole Nabout). He lets Danielle down gently but is surprised to discover a gift for his 30th birthday left by Juliette who is revealed to be his secret admirer. After a shaky start, James and Juliette begin dating. They then leave the bay together. Five years later, following Chloe's death in a car crash caused by Jesse McGregor (Ben Unwin), James returns to Summer Bay in the middle of a custody battle between Diana and Irene Roberts (Lynne McGranger) over Olivia. He reveals that he is the executor of Chloe's will and tells Irene that Chloe's will stipulates that Diana will not get custody and Olivia will live with James as per Chloe's wishes. Olivia is delighted and they leave for the UK.

== Reception ==
Inside Soap's Dasey opined that James was a "lovelorn" character. While Granditer assessed James and Chloe as being "hopelessly undevoted" to each other.
