= Olivia Fraser Richards =

- Home and Away character
- Raechelle Banno as Olivia Fraser Richards
- Portrayed by: Various (1998–1999); Ivy Latimer (2005); Raechelle Banno (2015–2018)
- Duration: 1998–1999, 2005, 2015–2018
- First appearance: 20 April 1998
- Last appearance: 13 August 2018
- Introduced by: John Holmes (1998); Julie McGuaran (2005); Lucy Addario (2015)
In-universe information
- Other names: Olivia Fraser; Olivia Richards
- Occupation: Student; Waitress; Clothing designer
- Father: Lachlan Fraser
- Mother: Chloe Richards
- Grandfathers: Peter Fraser; Max Richards
- Grandmothers: Diana Fraser; Maureen Richards
- Uncles: James Fraser

Olivia Fraser Richards is a fictional character from the Australian television soap opera Home and Away, played by Raechelle Banno. The character was born on-screen to parents Lachlan Fraser (Richard Grieve) and Chloe Richards (Kristy Wright) during the episode broadcast on 20 April 1998. Producers allowed Grieve and Wright to choose the name of their characters' daughter and they eventually settled on Olivia. The character was played by a number of infant actors until her departure in 1999. In 2005, Wright reprised her role as Chloe, while Ivy Latimer was cast as Olivia. Following Chloe's death, Olivia was at the centre of a custody battle between her grandmother Diana Fraser (Kerry McGuire) and Chloe's foster mother Irene Roberts (Lynne McGranger).

The character was reintroduced in 2015, with Banno cast in the role. During her audition, Banno performed scenes with actors Matt Little and Scott Lee, whose presence made her more "excited" about securing the role. Olivia is portrayed as bold, flirty, and confrontational. Banno also thought there was a darkness to Olivia. The character's early storylines focused on her friendship with VJ Patterson (Little), a feud with villain Charlotte King (Erika Heynatz), and the revelation that she has been self-harming due to being sexually abused. Banno praised the writers' decision to explore the issue of self-harm, as she believed it was a topic that was not often portrayed on television.

Producers paired Olivia with Hunter King (Lee), and their on-off relationship has been tested several times, with issues ranging from infidelity to pregnancy, and later a proposal. Olivia has also been the part of a love triangle involving Hunter and Mason Morgan (Orpheus Pledger). In May 2018, it was confirmed that Banno had left Home and Away and that she had already filmed her final scenes. Banno made her final appearance as Olivia on 13 August 2018.

== Creation and casting ==
The character was created in 1998, when screenwriters plotted a pregnancy storyline for Chloe Richards (Kristy Wright) and Lachlan Fraser (Richard Grieve). After Lachlan learns that Chloe is pregnant with his child, he is "totally shocked and confused", but vows to support Chloe. They eventually fall in love with each other. The scenes depicting Chloe's 36-hour labour and the birth took two and a half weeks to film. Chloe and Lachlan struggle to agree on a name for their daughter and spend a week fighting about it. Off-screen, the producers allowed Grieve and Wright to choose the name for the baby. Wright admitted that she and Grieve had trouble agreeing on a name, but they eventually settled on Olivia.

The character was played by a number of infant actors from her birth. When viewers spotted at least four different babies playing the role, a show spokesperson said "Our fans are quite right. But it was even more complicated when Chloe first gave birth. We had to have eight babies for the part." Zara Williams was chosen as one of the eight babies for the role after her mother Sasha Williams enrolled her in a talent agency. She admitted that she was excited to see her daughter on television and joked that Zara had more money than she did following her casting. The serial's medical advisor Wendy O'Donnell was always present on set in case the babies became distressed, but both Grieve and Wright commented that they had all been "so placid" and none of them had cried during the four weeks that they had worked with them. The Australian child employment laws state that young children are only available to work on set for certain number of hours, before they have to take a break. Each baby would appear on set for 20 minutes at a time.

== Development ==
=== 2005 return ===
When the character made a return in 2005, she was played by Ivy Latimer. A young Olivia returns to Summer Bay with her mother. Shortly after, Chloe dies in a car accident, leading to a custody battle between her grandmother Diana (Kerry McGuire) and Chloe's foster mother Irene Roberts (Lynne McGranger). Irene becomes "so desperate" to stop Olivia from going with Diana that she runs away with her, until Barry Hyde (Ivar Kants) makes her realise that she needs to return home. Olivia eventually leaves the Bay to live with her uncle James Fraser (Michael Piccirilli), and they later move to London.

=== Reintroduction ===
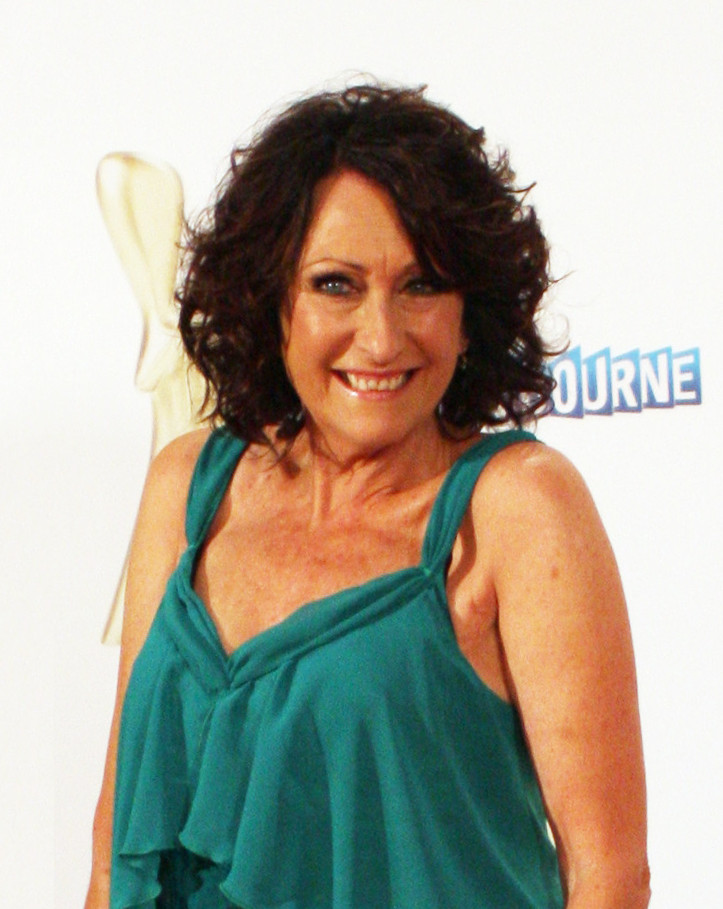
Olivia returns to the Bay to live with Irene, played by Lynne McGranger (pictured).

On 18 October 2015, Sally Rawsthorne of The Daily Telegraph reported that Olivia was being reintroduced to the show, with actress Raechelle Banno in the role. Banno told Rawsthorne that during her audition for the part, she performed alongside actors Matt Little and Scott Lee, an episode director and a producer. She also said that Little and Lee's presence in the audition made her more "excited" about winning the role and being in the show. Banno and her twin sister Karina had previously made several guest appearances in the show when they were younger. Banno said her sister was the first to find out that she had been cast in the show. Of joining the cast, Banno stated "I feel so fortunate that my start at working full-time in the industry is through being cast in something as respected as Home and Away. I have the privilege of being made to feel so welcome, while being trusted with the responsibility of bringing this great character to life."

Olivia's return scenes aired on 28 October. After arriving back in the Bay, Olivia goes to the beach and befriends VJ Patterson (Matt Little), after he catches her laying down on his beach towel. Banno said Olivia was "very forward" and wanted to gain VJ's attention, so she "just puts herself out there." VJ offers to show Olivia around the Bay, but she asks to see his place instead. Banno told Stephen Downie of TV Week that Olivia flirts with VJ to make him nervous. Olivia and VJ then steal some bikes to tour the town. Later that day, Olivia finds Irene and asks to stay with her permanently, after admitting that she has been suspended from her London school. Downie thought there was more to Olivia's story than it first seems. After Olivia begs Irene to let her stay in Australia, Banno confirmed that Olivia has "a bit of a past in the UK".

=== Characterisation ===
Olivia may seem like just a flirty wild-child to watch out for, but she has wisdom far beyond her years that stems from scars of a damaged past. All she wants in life is to be wanted, loved and cared for, and coming to Summer Bay might just make that happen."

— Raechelle Banno on Olivia's personality (2015).

Following her reintroduction, Banno thought Olivia was looking for somewhere to belong, whether that was with Irene or a new friendship group. She was also looking for "new opportunities", and something to "fill a void in her life", but it was likely that she was running away from "some demons in her past." Banno described Olivia as bold, "a definite go-getter", and as someone who puts themselves out there. She also said Olivia was flirtatious, as well as "confrontational and forward, and doesn't care what anyone thinks." She found that while they were similar, unlike Olivia she does not like confrontation at all. Banno believed that Olivia had "a darkness about her" that tries to keep hidden, and she would make viewers feel sympathy for her.

=== Feud with Charlotte King ===
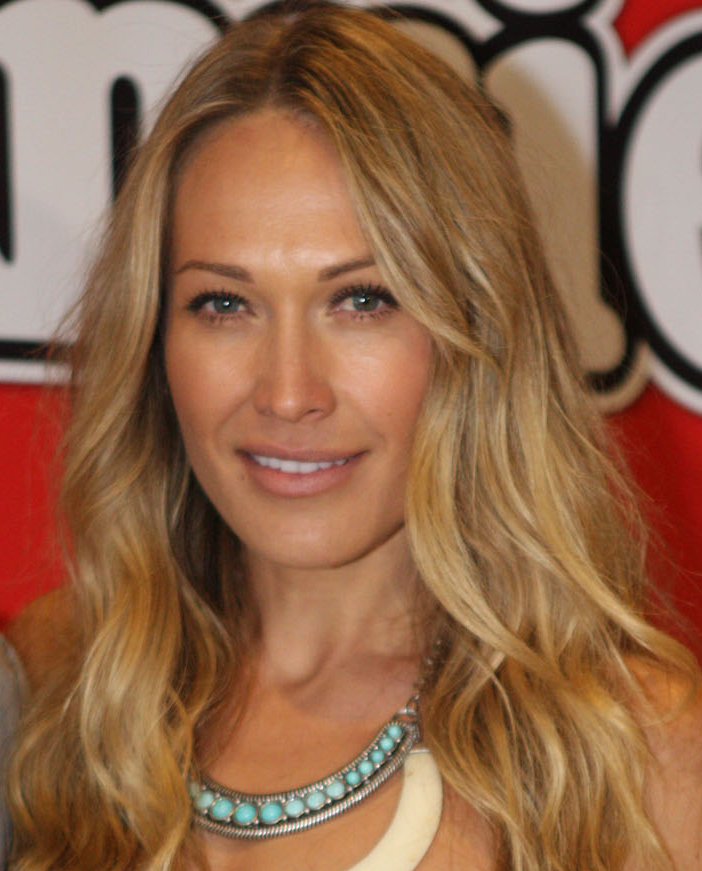
Olivia is threatened by Charlotte King, played by Erika Heynatz (pictured).

Olivia was later introduced into the plot focusing on villain Charlotte King (Erika Heynatz). Olivia comes across Charlotte arguing with Irene about being evicted from the flat above the diner. Banno explained that Olivia has heard stories about Charlotte before their meeting, and her opinion of her "isn't a positive one form the get-go." Charlotte shows an aggressive attitude towards Irene, which is why Olivia comes to her defence. Charlotte then turns her "wrath" on Olivia, who stands her ground. The argument is broken up by Kyle Braxton (Nic Westaway), but Downie pointed out that the women have become enemies. Charlotte later threatens Olivia, who gets revenge by spreading the trash from the diner throughout Charlotte's flat. Olivia is then questioned by Constable Kat Chapman (Pia Miller), and Banno said, "She wasn't expecting to see the police. And, she didn't really consider the consequences of her actions."

Charlotte is later shot and killed, which starts a "whodunit" storyline. Olivia was named as one of several suspects. The identity of the shoot was kept a secret from the cast and crew. Each actor whose character was a suspect filmed a different ending to keep the conclusion to the storyline from being leaked. Sophie Dainty of Digital Spy later broke down the motives for each character. Of Olivia, Dainty speculated that after Charlotte threatened her, she may have got there first. Dainty wrote, "Olivia had more reason than most to want her gone." Charlotte's killer was later revealed to be Josh Barrett (Jackson Gallagher).

=== Self-harming and sexual abuse ===
The character was the focus of an issue-led storyline about self-harming. The plot begins when Olivia meets up with Hunter King (Scott Lee) at the local beach pool. She appears reluctant to get out of the water and asks Hunter to turn away while she gets her towel. However, Hunter "can't resist a peek" and he sees that Olivia has scars covering her thighs, leading him to suspect that she is hiding a secret about her life in London. Of the moment, Banno commented "She understands more than anyone why he'd be shocked to see them. That's probably half the reason she's not quite ready to go down that path just yet." While Hunter does not saying anything at the time, he tells VJ what he saw. VJ uses the opportunity "to one-up" Hunter and assures Olivia that he is around if she wants to talk about her scars, leaving her embarrassed and angry.

Banno confirmed that her character has both emotional and physical scars, and that being able to share them with others takes time. She also said that Olivia is "trying to take each day as it comes." Irene soon finds out about the scars and during the ensuing confrontation, Olivia "freaks out" and runs off to the beach, where she collapses in tears. Olivia reveals that the reason she began self-harming was due to the sexual abuse she suffered at the hands of her uncle's friend. She admits to Irene that she was fearful of not being believed, so she did not tell anyone what was happening. The storyline led to the revelation that Irene was also sexually abused when she was younger, and had given birth to a child that was adopted out.

The storyline was revisited in April 2016, after Olivia has an abortion. Olivia struggles to cope and eventually starts self-harming again. Banno explained that it was Olivia's "natural coping mechanism" when she is faced with something traumatic. No one notices what Olivia is doing, as they are giving her space to deal with recent events. Banno said filming was "full-on", and she hoped that she brought "honesty and sincerity" to the scenes. She also praised the writers' decision to explore the issue of self-harm, as it was not often portrayed on television.

Olivia's sexual abuse storyline was also revisited after her former friend Tabitha Ford (Eliza Scanlen) pretends to be her abuser Kirk online. The incident brings up bad memories for Olivia and prompts her to go to the police to report both Tabitha and Kirk. Banno told an Inside Soap writer that Olivia believes that she can get justice. She continued, "It sounds like the right thing to do. But going through what happened comes with emotional baggage. It's a very vulnerable position for Olivia to be in – it's completely terrifying." With Irene's support, Olivia tells Sergeant Phillip McCarthy (Nicholas Cassim) about Tabitha's psychological abuse, but she cannot explain the details of Kirk's abuse and flees the station. Kat later finds Olivia and tells her about her the abuse she received from her former boyfriend. Kat encourages Olivia to return to the station and report Kirk.

=== Relationships ===
==== Hunter King ====
In an early news article about her reintroduction, it was confirmed that Olivia would be paired with Hunter King upon her arrival, after Banno and Scott Lee were photographed filming a kissing scene at the show's outdoor location in Palm Beach. Lee credited Olivia with calming his character down and making him more likeable to viewers. At the start of their relationship, Olivia helps Hunter deal with his grief at his mother's death and his attempts to get to know his new family members. Lee stated, "Hunter and Olivia have both been through a lot and they comfort each other. They're both quite lonely. I think you'd naturally gravitate towards someone like that if you've been through what they have." The relationship is tested by Hunter's failure to makes plans for his future, and the introduction of Lindsay Ford (Georgia Flood), who reveals that Hunter cheated on Olivia with her.

Hunter and Olivia are brought closer following a "traumatic experience" in the bush. Hunter organises a romantic picnic for Olivia. But Hunter soon doubles over in pain and struggles to breathe. Olivia "panics" and has to run to the road to flag down a passing car, which is being driven by Hunter's father Zac MacGuire (Charlie Clausen). Hunter's condition deteriorates and Nate Cooper (Kyle Pryor) diagnoses Hunter with a tension pneumothorax over the phone. Nate manages to talk Zac through a procedure to ease Hunter's pain and he is later given the all clear. The incident causes the couple to reaffirm their feelings for one another. Of this, Banno commented, "Olivia is keen for a fresh start. The fact they're both on the same page and focused on getting back on track means so much to her."

"Once upon a time, I would have said that Hunter and Olivia were perfectly suited. But their lives have taken different directions – and I don't think they complement each other in a healthy way."

— Lee on how Olivia and Hunter's relationship has changed (2018).

Producers then used the couple to explore the issue of teenage pregnancy. After Olivia organises another picnic for Hunter, he tries to initiate sex, but she rejects his advances and runs off. Laura Morgan of All About Soap observed, "it soon becomes clear Olivia's not feeling the same, and something serious is playing on her mind." As she has been feeling sick, Olivia takes a pregnancy test, which comes back positive. Banno described the news as "life-changing" and thought it would mean big adjustments for her body and her relationship with Hunter. Hunter flees when he learns that Olivia is pregnant, but he soon returns to support her. Banno said the couple were "two 16-year-olds dealing with an adult issue". Olivia and Hunter decide they are not ready for a child and Olivia has an abortion.

Hunter and Olivia's relationship ends after he punches their friend Jordan Walsh (Benny Turland) at a party. The following day, Hunter argues with Olivia after seeing her talking to Jordan, who tells Olivia that she deserves better. Banno commented that Jordan's statement was quite confronting for Olivia to hear. But she soon realises that Hunter's recent actions have really affected their relationship and questions their future as a couple. When Olivia tells Hunter tell what Jordan said, he breaks up with her and she accepts that their relationship is over. Banno thought that her character had become aware of how toxic the relationship had become.

Hunter and Olivia later reunite and their relationship is immediately tested by VJ's attempt to kiss Olivia. The storyline begins with Olivia and Hunter taking VJ out to local restaurant Salt to cheer him up, after he loses custody of his step-daughter. VJ drinks to excess and when he becomes verbally abusive towards Hunter, Olivia tells Hunter to leave while she calms VJ down. However, VJ makes a comment about how things could have turned out if they had dated, before trying to kiss Olivia, who pushes him off. Hunter and VJ then fight, with Olivia having to separate them. She "goes ballistic" at Hunter, causing tension between them.

Hunter later decides to propose to Olivia. Although Hunter purchases an engagement ring while he is drunk, Lee thought that his character was serious about his love for Olivia. During a meal at Salt, Hunter puts the ring in Olivia's champagne glass, but it gets knocked over and she believes the ring belongs to someone else. Lee said Hunter was "a bit embarrassed", especially when Olivia says the ring is ugly. The incident prompts Hunter to plan the proposal out properly. However, Lee did not want Hunter to go through with it, as he believed the couple were no longer compatible. Irene learns that Hunter has organised a second proposal and tells Olivia, who plans to say accept. However, after Hunter makes speech about their relationship, Olivia rejects him and leaves the beach, unable to cope with her guilt at having cheated on him.

==== Mason Morgan ====
Producers later paired Olivia with Bay newcomer Mason Morgan (Orpheus Pledger). They also formed a love triangle storyline with them and Hunter. When Hunter sees a text message from Mason on Olivia's phone, he forces her to admit that she is romantically interested in Mason. Hunter and Olivia argue, which results in Olivia stating that she might just be better off with Mason. Downie thought that as Mason and Hunter are quite different from each other, this would appeal to Olivia. Downie later noted that both Hunter and Olivia still had strong feelings for one another, but when Mason makes his interest in Olivia clear, she "can't help but feel drawn to him." Banno added that Olivia likes the element of curiosity about Mason.

After Olivia assures Mason that she and Hunter are moving on, he accepts her invitation to the school formal. Hunter also attends and when he and Olivia dance together, Mason realises that still has feelings for him. The following day, Olivia fails to assure Mason that her dance with Hunter meant nothing. She later learns that Hunter and Mason have been involved in a fight. Pledger explained that Olivia wants them to start over, but Mason rejects the idea. But when they later attend the Summer Grooves music festival, Mason and Olivia share a kiss. Mason and Olivia consummate their relationship at the Summer Bay Auto garage, where they are caught out by Irene and Mason's brother.

After Olivia fails to tell Mason about working with Hunter at the Pier Diner, their relationship becomes strained as he believes that she still has feelings for her former boyfriend. Olivia also questions her commitment to Mason when she turns to Hunter for support ahead of her first day at university. Olivia and Mason's break up aired in April 2017, after she finally admits that she still has feelings for Hunter. Although she asks that they continue dating, Mason rejects her proposition and ends their relationship.

=== Infidelity ===
"I was really sad for her that this was going to be such a challenge for her and Hunter."

— Banno on the end of Olivia and Hunter's relationship.

Producers later implemented another break-up for Olivia and Hunter. They introduced guest character Axel Boyd (Matthew Pearce), whose presence in Olivia's life helped act as a catalyst for the end of the relationship. Axel is a representative for online clothing retailer, The Find, who signs Olivia as a fashion designer. Of Olivia and Axel's relationship, Banno told an Inside Soap columnist, "She and Axel obviously have chemistry, but Liv is trying to work out if it's just creative chemistry or more romantic." Axel later makes romantic advances towards Olivia and kisses her. She decides not to tell Hunter about the kiss, and Banno thought that if she did, it would "ruffle more feathers than necessary". Axel organises a fashion showcase for Olivia, who invites Hunter and Mason along. However, it soon becomes clear that the couple's differences are starting to have an effect on their relationship, after Hunter mocks her new "working world".

Hunter puts Olivia's career in jeopardy when he organises a meeting with The Trend, a competitor of The Find. When Axel discovers the meeting, he informs Olivia that The Find are cancelling her contract and they will sue if she joins The Trend. In a bid to save her job, Olivia visits Axel to apologise and asks for his help, but he admits that he may trouble convincing his boss not to fire her. He then invites her to stay for a drink, which leads to them kissing and having sex. Speaking to a New Idea writer, Banno stated that Olivia "sort of loses her inhibition" due to alcohol and she does not think about anything else in that moment. Banno admitted that she was put to the test when she found out about the plot for her character, to whom she had become attached. She found it challenging to film, commenting "It's something that I can never see myself doing. It's such a tough moral issue, but you have to play it with integrity." Banno added that she kept apologising to Lee after filming because she had to ignore him during the scenes. Olivia attempts to tell Hunter the truth, but later decides to confide in her friend Ziggy Astoni (Sophie Dillman), who "is horrified by Olivia's actions". Ziggy gives Olivia an ultimatum – either Olivia tells Hunter or Ziggy will do it for her. Ziggy later refuses to be a part of Hunter's second proposal to Olivia, while Axel invites her to accompany him to Paris Fashion Week. Digital Spy's Sophie Dainty reported that Olivia is tempted by the offer, as she is developing feelings for Axel. After rejecting Hunter's proposal, Olivia goes to see Axel at his motel room.

=== Departure ===
In the 5–11 May 2018 issue of Inside Soap, it was confirmed that Banno had left Home and Away and that she had already filmed her final scenes, with Olivia's departure to air later in the year. Banno's final scenes as Olivia aired on 13 August 2018. Olivia leaves the Bay for "an exciting work opportunity" in Melbourne. Of filming Olivia's exit, Banno said "It was a really emotional journey for me, but a positive one to be able to send off Olivia in such an independent way. It was a tough day, because you want to do the right thing by the scene, but you're also feeling quite indulgent yourself." The actress did not rule out a return in the future, and added that it was nice of the producers to leave the door open for Olivia to return to her Summer Bay family.

== Storylines ==
=== 1998–1999, 2005 ===
Following her birth, Olivia is diagnosed with a heart murmur and undergoes surgery. Her mother, Chloe, raises Olivia alone, after her father, Lachlan moves to the United States for treatment for brain damage, and later reveals that he has no feelings for either of them. Lachie's mother, Diana, tries to involve herself in Olivia's life, while Lachie's brother, James also keeps an eye on the family. Olivia falls ill and James takes her to a specialist, who operates to correct a narrow aorta in her heart. James and Chloe have a brief marriage. After Lachie dies, Diana becomes obsessed with Olivia and kidnaps her. Her husband, Peter (Helmut Bakaitis) rescues Olivia and checks Diana into a clinic. Needing a fresh start, Chloe and Olivia move to the city.

Six years later, Olivia and Chloe return to Summer Bay, as Chloe is trying to escape an abusive boyfriend. Olivia is orphaned after Chloe dies following a car accident. Chloe's former foster mother, Irene Roberts applies for custody of Olivia, as does Diana. Olivia begs Irene not to let Diana take her, so they leave the Bay, but Barry Hyde convinces Irene to return home. Custody is awarded to Diana, but James announces that he is the executor of Chloe's will, which stipulates that he should be Olivia's guardian in the event of Chloe's death. James and Olivia move to the city, and then London.

=== 2015–2018 ===
Ten years later, Olivia returns to the Bay alone, having been expelled from her school in London. She befriends VJ Patterson on the beach and they steal some bikes to explore the area. Olivia then visits Irene to ask if she can live with her. Irene soon learns from James that Olivia stole his credit card to buy herself a plane ticket. Irene agrees to let Olivia stay. Olivia is forced to work at the diner, after she and VJ take a car for a joy ride. Olivia also befriends Hunter King and stands up to his mother, Charlotte, when she is aggressive towards Irene. Charlotte later threatens Olivia, so she throws garbage around Charlotte's flat. After Hunter sees scars on her legs, Olivia explains to Irene that she has been self-harming since she was sexually abused by Kirk Shephard, one of James's friends. Irene also admits that she was sexually abused by an uncle, and they agree to see a counsellor. Olivia and Hunter start dating. Soon after, Hunter leaves the Bay when Charlotte's crimes are revealed. Upon his return, Olivia provides comfort when he learns Charlotte is dead.

Olivia takes a dislike to Skye Peters (Marlo Kelly) after she moves into the Beach House, but they soon become friends. Olivia interferes when Claire Lewis (Anita Hegh) claims to be Irene's daughter. Hunter refuses to support her when she orders a DNA test, which soon reveals that Irene is not Claire's mother. Olivia breaks up with Hunter after learning that he kissed Lindsay Ford during his time away. Lindsay pays a friend to make romantic advances towards Olivia, and Olivia attempts to slap her. Lindsay takes a ute for a joyride and injures Hunter when she loses control of the vehicle. Olivia threatens to call the police and Lindsay leaves the Bay. Olivia and Hunter get back together and go on a romantic picnic, where Hunter collapses with a tension pneumothorax. Olivia flags down a passing car being driven by Zac MacGuire (Charlie Clausen), and he helps save Hunter. Olivia learns she is pregnant and she and Hunter decide to have an abortion. Olivia begins self-harming again, but stops with help from housemate Chris Harrington (Johnny Ruffo).

Irene is kidnapped by her estranged son Mick Jennings (Kristian Schmid), who attempts to kidnap Olivia too. She manages to place her phone in his car, before escaping. She and Chris track the phone and rescue Irene. During a party, Hunter gets drunk and punches Jordan Walsh out of jealousy when he sees him talking with Olivia. Jordan advises Olivia to break-up with Hunter, and when she tells Hunter what he said, Hunter's angry reaction leads her to end the relationship. Olivia then meets up with Tabitha Ford, a friend from her support group, to attend a charity sleep out event at the high school. Hunter argues with Olivia, and Tabitha later tells Olivia that Hunter called her scars disgusting, which he denies. Olivia continues to spend time with Tabitha, until she catches her framing Hunter for tampering with an exam result.

Tabitha later poses as Kirk, the man who abused Olivia. Through an online chat, she forces Olivia to comply with her instructions or risk a video of her abuse being posted online. Hunter catches Tabitha and manages to send Olivia a message telling her what is happening. Olivia reports both Tabitha and Kirk to the police, and Tabitha is expelled. Olivia and Hunter also reconcile, but they break-up once again after they argue over Hunter's career plans and a pregnancy scare. Olivia dates Mason Morgan, but she still has feelings for Hunter and they eventually break-up. Olivia and Hunter decide to move in together. They rent a property without viewing it first and they are later burgled. Irene invites Hunter to move into the Beach House instead. Olivia is reluctant to celebrate her 18th birthday and she expresses her regret that her parents are not around to celebrate it with her. Olivia and Hunter take VJ out to cheer him up and he tries to kiss Olivia, who pushes him away. He and Hunter then end up in a fight.

Olivia supports Hunter when he learns Zac is not his biological father. She encourages Hunter to get in contact with his grandmother, who later reports them both to the police for keeping quiet about Hunter's involvement in stealing the diner safe some months previously. Olivia befriends Bay newcomer Ziggy Astoni. Hunter helps Olivia set up a website, so she can sell her clothing designs. Sales are slow to begin with, but after a disastrous launch party at Salt, the publicity generates more interest. Olivia forges Irene's signature to take some money from her trust fund. Irene finds out and after Olivia explains that Chloe taught her to make dresses, Irene invests her own money in the business. Sales soon drop off when a copy of her most popular design is sold on fashion website, The Find. She meets with the company's representative Axel Boyd, who offers her a contract. Axel suggests that Hunter is holding her back, and he later kisses her. Hunter arranges for Olivia to meet a representative from another fashion brand. Axel finds out and he informs Olivia that she has breached the exclusivity clause in her contract. After arguing with Hunter, Olivia visits Axel at his motel, where she gets drunk and they have sex.

Axel helps Olivia get her contract with The Find back. Both Irene and Ziggy find out about her one-night stand with Axel, and Ziggy threatens to tell Hunter. Hunter proposes, but Olivia cannot accept and ends their relationship. She stays with Axel in the city, but she feels homesick after talking with Irene and returns to the Bay. She apologises to Hunter, who reveals that he knows she cheated on him. When Olivia explains that she had sex with Axel to save her career, Hunter says he never wants to see her again. They struggle to be friends, especially when Hunter dates Jennifer Dutton (Brittany Santariga). Olivia also struggles to come up with new fashion designs and she later quits The Find. While drunk, Olivia insults Hunter and invites Jasmine Delaney (Sam Frost) to move in. Jasmine later overhears Olivia telling Ziggy that she made a mistake. Olivia apologises to Jasmine and admits that she was jealous of her bond with Irene. Olivia and Hunter have a one-night stand, but agree that they should not get back together. Olivia makes Ziggy's wedding dress and is soon commissioned to make another, after Ziggy's dress is spotted online. Olivia receives a job interview with a wedding fashion company in Melbourne, but when she returns she admits that it did not go well once they brought up her history with The Find. However, the company offer Olivia the job and she accepts. Before leaving the Bay, Irene and her friends throw her a farewell party at Salt. She says her goodbyes to Hunter, before leaving for Melbourne.

== Reception ==
After seeing her return scenes, Downie (TV Week) called Olivia "a blast from the past", a "cheeky blonde" and "an outrageous flirt!" While Frances Sacco of The Daily Telegraph branded Olivia "flirty, feisty and a bit of a wild child". Downie later observed, "ever since she came to the Bay, there has been a degree of danger about Olivia's actions." A writer for TVNZ later included Olivia in their list of the show's "most troubled teens", where they called her "a bit of a wild child". A TV Week contributor included the character in their feature on Irene's best foster children throughout the years. Of Olivia and Irene's relationship, they said "The two have been through a traumatic time since her arrival in the Bay, with both revealing they were victims of sexual assault."

In November 2015, 58% of TV Week readers voted that they liked Hunter and Olivia as a couple. After the couple broke up, Downie commented, "In truth, Olivia and Hunter had a tempestuous relationship. Barely a week went by when they weren't fighting with each other." While Downie's colleague Tamara Cullen thought Olivia "could be the most hated person in Summer Bay" after she rejected Hunter's marriage proposal.

In April 2017, Home and Away and fellow Australian soap opera Neighbours were accused of encouraging teenage girls to get pregnant after airing various teenage pregnancy storylines. Olivia's abortion plot was cited as a recent example.
