= Over the Hill (TV series) =

Australian television drama

Over the Hill is an Australian television drama which first screened on the Seven Network in 1994. Over the Hill was produced by Gary Reilly, written by John Flanagan and directed by Tony Osicka and Leigh Spence. It was not renewed after its first season of 13 episodes.

== Synopsis ==
Over the Hill follows the story of a couple who realise the great Australian dream of buying a pub in the country.

== Cast ==
- Georgie Parker as Sandy Spencer
- Nicholas Eadie as Don Spencer
- Belinda Cotterill as Melissa Spencer
- Nic Testoni as Jeremy
- Darren Yap as Kevin
- Roy Billing as Short Bob
- Bruce Spence as Tall Bob
- Peter Gwynne as Pat the Poet
- Kate Raison

== See also ==
- List of Australian television series
- List of Seven Network programs
