= Women He's Undressed =

- Film poster
- Directed by: Gillian Armstrong
- Written by: Katherine Thompson
- Based on: Women I've Undressed by Orry-Kelly
- Produced by: Gillian Armstrong; Graham Buckeridge; Marian Macgowan; Damien Parer; Michael Wrenn
- Starring: Darren Gilshenan; Deborah Kennedy; David E. Woodley; Lara Cox
- Cinematography: Anna Howard
- Music by: Cezary Skubiszewski
- Production company: Damien Parer Productions
- Distributed by: Rialto Distribution
- Release date: June 2015 (Sydney Film Festival)
- Running time: 99 minutes
- Country: Australia
- Language: English

Women He's Undressed is a 2015 Australian documentary film about costume designer Orry-Kelly, three time winner of the Academy Award for Best Costume Design. Directed by Gillian Armstrong, it stars Darren Gilshenan, Deborah Kennedy, David E. Woodley, and Lara Cox.

== Interviewees ==
- Jane Fonda
- Angela Lansbury
- Catherine Martin
- Leonard Maltin
- Ann Roth
- Colleen Atwood
- Michael Wilkinson
- Deborah Nadoolman Landis

== Cast ==
- Darren Gilshenan as Orry-Kelly
- Deborah Kennedy as Florence Kelly
- David E. Woodley as William Kelly
- Lara Cox as Ginger Rogers
- Sandy Gore as Hedda Hopper / Louella Parsons
- Laurie Foell as Nurse

== Reception ==
On review aggregator Rotten Tomatoes, 91% of 33 critics have given the film a positive review, with an average rating of 7.7/10.
