= Vinnie Patterson =

- Home and Away character
- Portrayed by: Ryan Kwanten (1997–2002); Uncredited (2004)
- Duration: 1997–2002, 2004
- First appearance: 14 July 1997
- Last appearance: 19 November 2004
- Introduced by: John Holmes
In-universe information
- Occupation: Bonza Burger Employee; Lifeguard; Student; Stripper; Clown
- Father: Ralph Patterson
- Mother: Stella Patterson
- Wife: Leah Poulos (2001–2005)
- Sons: VJ Patterson
- Uncles: Tim Patterson
- First cousins: Alison Patterson; Mav Patterson; Skye Patterson; Kim Patterson

Vincent "Vinnie" Patterson is a fictional character from the Australian soap opera Home and Away, played by Ryan Kwanten. He made his first on screen appearance on 14 July 1997 and departed on 1 March 2002. The character made a brief return appearance in the episode shown on 19 November 2004 without Kwanten reprising the role, appearing wearing a bear costume and played by an uncredited actor.

== Development ==
Kwanten previously appeared in the serial in 1992 and 1994.

In 1999, Vinnie was diagnosed with testicular cancer. Vinnie is devastated by the diagnosis and is left terrified about his future. Kwanten told Jason Herbison of Inside Soap that the illness is probably the biggest thing that can happen to the male ego and that it would obviously affect Vinnie badly as he has a very big ego. The actor added "He is proud of his manhood and he thinks he's God's gift, so this is going to cut him down to size, so to speak."

== Storylines ==
Vinnie is first seen riding a jet ski while Travis Nash (Nic Testoni) works on his boat and splashes him much to his annoyance. Vinnie lends the ski to Aaron Welles (Ritchie Gudgeon) and lands him in trouble when Travis assumes Aaron was the one speeding around. When Vinnie annoys Travis again, he falls off the ski and has to be rescued. Vinnie later dates Aaron's sister, Justine (Bree Desborough). When Travis and his wife Rebecca (Belinda Emmett) take over the caravan park and become Justine's guardians, they are not keen on Vinnie constantly being around. Vinnie and Justine become closer and after Justine asks if he can stay over, Travis and Rebecca reluctantly agree. It soon emerges Vinnie, despite having a reputation as a ladies man is still a virgin and they decide to wait. Vinnie draws Justine's ire when he flirts with Gypsy Nash (Kimberley Cooper) when she arrives in the Bay.

Vinnie's father, Ralph (Alan Cinis) goes bankrupt after being exposed for tax evasion and Vinnie is forced to look for work and first tries his hand as the manager of two bands; The Chick Magnets consisting of Aaron, Joey Rainbow (Alex O'Han) and Tom Nash (Graeme Squires) and The Broken Dolls formed of Justine, Gypsy and Tiegan Brook (Sally Marrett) and tries to convince principal Donald Fisher (Norman Coburn) to let the band play at the school dance. The bands soon merge and become known as the Broken Magnets. Vinnie's next series of jobs prove ultimately more unsuccessful, Travis hires him on his boat but due to his carelessness he is fired and when he tries his hand at working for an undertaker, Vinnie loses that job when he sells Alf a display coffin. Not one to be deterred, Vinnie continues and lands a part-time gig as a stripper. After winning a triathlon, Vinnie wins the grand prize; a job at Bonza Burger who are sponsoring the event. Vinnie tries everything he can to have his boss Jason fire him and succeeds by wearing the Bonza Burger uniform on a stripping assignment.

Vinnie later joins Jesse McGregor (Ben Unwin) at Travis' old place and persuades Sally Fletcher (Kate Ritchie) to move in with them in a ploy to get her to do the housework but it backfires when Sally draws up a roster. Vinnie hires Justine to do his share. After a misunderstanding where Vinnie pretends to be Jesse in order to date a girl, Justine finds out and dumps him. Vinnie tries to win her back with a proposal but discovers her kissing Tom backstage after the school play. Vinnie and Sally soon find themselves getting closer together and share a kiss one day. After spending the holidays together, they return to the Bay, pretending they took separate vacations in order to keep their relationship a secret. Jesse eventually finds out and they persuade him not to say anything. When the couple go public by announcing their relationship in the Diner, there is very little reaction as Jesse has informed several people beforehand, until Justine walks in and sees Vinnie kissing Sally. A while later Sally suspects she is pregnant prompting Vinnie to worry, but it is a false alarm.

Vinnie receives some news from a solicitor who tells him he could receive $50,000 if he returns to school to complete Year 12 and obtain a HSC score high enough to get into University. He visits Donald who lets him return to school out of gratitude for helping get his pregnant wife Marilyn (Emily Symons) to hospital, but Vinnie has to readjust to school life including wearing the uniform. While visiting a nudist beach with Sally, Vinnie ends up with a full-body sunburn and when Sally applies some lotion, she finds a lump. Vinnie visits doctor James Fraser (Michael Piccirilli), who diagnoses him with testicular cancer. Vinnie reluctantly agrees but asks for Sally to keep it a secret and is annoyed with her when she lets it slip to Jesse and Gypsy. Vinnie later decides to tell everybody and agrees to the surgery. However, when learning of the possibility of losing a testicle, he decides to try alternative therapies including healthy eating. This fails when Vinnie cannot stick to an alternative diet. Eventually, Vinnie has the surgery and has the testicle removed. When Vinnie awakes, he calls out for Justine much to Sally's shock. Vinnie quickly reassures Sally that she is the one he wants to be with.

When Year 12 study the novel Great Expectations as part of the HSC, Vinnie begins to wonder if Donald is his secret benefactor. Vinnie gets a shock when he finds that the benefactor is none other than Ralph. Ralph presents a new business venture but is revealed to be a con and flees the Bay. Vinnie realises that he will not see a penny of the money and puts little to no effort into his exams and receives one of the lowest HSC scores on record. Vinnie and Sally soon break up and Vinnie throws himself into become a photographer and tries to make a career out of it. Sally lends him the money for a digital camera. Vinnie throws Sally a 21st birthday party in a last-ditch attempt to win her back but she makes it clear that the relationship is over.

After Leah Poulos (Ada Nicodemou) flees her wedding and hitches a lift, Vinnie is on the scene to pick her up and lets her stay in Sally's room while she is away. Vinnie and Tom, who has since moved in, both take a liking to her and Vinnie steps aside to give Tom a chance but it is Vinnie that Leah is interested in. After Leah feels uncomfortable living with someone she is dating, she moves in with Shauna Bradley (Kylie Watson) and is later joined by Sally. After Leah treads on a needlestick while helping Vinnie clear the beach, they both fear for Leah's health. Vinnie proposes but Leah turns him down and tells him to ask again in three months after she receives the test results. The tests return negative and Vinnie doesn't propose straight away, Leah thinks he has gone cold on the idea. Vinnie, with the help of Harry Reynolds (Justin Melvey), uses a plane with a banner showing his proposal to Leah and she accepts. The wedding goes smoothly and Leah moves back in with Vinnie. Leah soon falls pregnant and Vinnie has money worries and takes an extra job of as a children's entertainer, Vin-Vin the Clown.

Ralph reappears and Vinnie is initially suspicious but softens when Ralph tells him he is dying and wants to set Vinnie up in business. They organise a company which will buy and sell stock from bankrupt companies. After Leah's brother Alex (Danny Raco) and Alf Stewart (Ray Meagher) suspect Ralph of playing Vinnie for a fool, he initially refuses to believe it but when Ralph flees and he finds a note reading “I’m Sorry”, Vinnie is forced to face the truth. Leah's father, Theo (Silvo Orfia) helps out financially. Shortly after the birth of his new son, VJ, Vinnie is arrested and charged with fraud and with no evidence to connect Ralph to the crime, Vinnie is tried and convicted, resulting in a two-year prison sentence. Vinnie tells Leah on her first visit not to visit him any more but to pretend he is away on holiday and they agree to communicate via letters before a tearful goodbye. Vinnie is soon joined in prison by Jesse, who he asks to keep an eye on his family when he is released. When news of Vinnie's alleged death in a prison fire filters to the bay, everyone is devastated. It is later revealed that Vinnie survived the fire and is living in witness protection. Leah contemplates leaving to be with him but decides to stay as she is now with Dan Baker (Tim Campbell). On the day of VJ's 3rd birthday party, a stranger in a bear costume arrives and entertains the children throughout the day. When he leaves, Leah learns that it was Vinnie in disguise and finds a letter from him, telling her to move on with her life. In 2010, Elijah Johnson (Jay Laga'aia) arrives in Summer Bay and reveals to Leah that Vinnie died in a farming accident 18 months earlier and during his dying days he recounted his life in the Bay and how he wanted to be there for Leah and VJ. Elijah takes them to visit Vinnie's grave in order to give them closure.

== Reception ==
For his portrayal of Vinnie, Kwanten was nominated for Funniest Character at the 1999 Inside Soap Awards. Kwanten was later nominated for Most Popular Actor at the 2002 Logie Awards. Anna Higgins of Yahoo! Entertainment said Vinnie was "a schemer, wannabe womaniser and perpetual optimist." Jackie Brygel of the Herald Sun branded Vinnie "a lad who has never been renowned for his great intellect or insightful philosophies on life". Writing for TV Week, Brygel named Leah and Vinnie as one of soap's "Odd Couples". She said "Vinnie was the local goofball working as a stripper. Leah was the responsible Greek girl. They lived together as flatmates and she found herself falling for his quirkiness." An Inside Soap reporter branded Vinnie's return from the dead dressed as a giant teddy bear a "bonkers - but nonetheless brilliant" storyline.
