= David E. Woodley =

David E Woodley
- Born: David Edwin Woodley; Queensland, Australia
- Occupations: Actor; writer; director
- Years active: 1986–present
- Notable work: Echo Point (1995); Home and Away (1998–2000)

David Edwin Woodley is an Australian theatre, television and film actor, director and writer. He is best known for his roles in the soap operas Echo Point, as Hopper Hadley, and Home and Away, as Joel Nash.

== Career ==
He began his career as a stage actor in Brisbane, Australia performing under the direction of renown Shakespearean director Bryan Nason AM. Woodley toured with local theatre company Grin and Tonic. before again performing under the direction of Bryan Nason in dual roles as Ea and Utnapishtim, in The Royal Queensland Theatre Company's production of Gilgamesh. Believing the UK produced most exceptional actors, Woodley moved to England to undertake drama studies at St Catherine's Drama Studio in Guildford, Surrey, UK under the direction of June and Adrian Cooper. Whilst living in the UK, he also undertook private voice studies with Alan Woodhouse at Guildhall School of Music and Drama, London.

Being an avid and competent horseman, on Woodley's return to Australia he trained in stunts with Canadian born stunt co-coordinator Ric Anderson in 'Horses and Heroes' a live western stunt show on the Gold Coast. He relocated to Sydney in 1995 after gaining the role of series regular, Hopper Hadley in the Network 10 television drama Echo Point, along with fellow actors, Rose Byrne (28 Weeks Later) and Martin Henderson (The Ring). Woodley went on to become a series regular with the long running series, Home and Away as Joel Nash from 1998–2000.

Woodley has performed roles in many Australian drama series including the award-winning ABC TV series Rake as well as US productions of Spartacus - Gods of the Arena and Legend of the Seeker

Woodley plays Mike Evans in the first installment of the Science Fiction Trilogy The Three-Body Problem adapted from the novel of the same name written by acclaimed Chinese author and winner of the 2015 Hugo Awards, Liu Cixin.

Returning to a former love, Woodley now plays rotating roles at Village Roadshow's horse-based Australian Outback Spectacular.

Woodley holds a Bachelor's Degree in film production from SAE Institute, Sydney.

== Filmography ==
Film
Year	Title	Role	Notes
1992	Over the Hill	Barman	
1999	Sick Puppy	David	Short
2001	The Last Espejo Cha Cha	David	Short
2003	Merry-Go-Round	Ricardo	Short
2004	Get Rich Quick	Valdamir	
2004	PictoCrime	Jerry Hamilton	
2006	Five Moments of Infidelity	Shane	Segment 5
2006	Body in the Trunk	Jerry	Short
2006	The New Life	Male Cop	Short
2007	The Silence is Broken	Richard	Short
2007	The Tomb	Sergeant Colton	Short
2013	The Key	Prisoner 1	Short
2014	Ties	Reece	Short
2014	Gayby	Dad	Short
2015	Women He's Undressed	William Kelly	
2015	UnIndian	Boat Captain	
2017	Dance Academy: The Movie	Marcus Kane	
2017	Event Zero	Jim Johnson	
2022	Dark Noise	Dr. Donovan McFadden	
2023	Sons of Summer	Scallop	
TBA	The Three-Body Problem: I	Mike Evans	Post-production

Television
Year	Title	Role	Notes
1989	Mission: Impossible	Pilot	Season 1, episode 18
1995	Tunnel Vision	David De Salvo	TV movie
1995	Echo Point	Hopper Hadley	Season 1 (main role, 130 episodes)
1996	Home and Away	Barry	Season 9, episodes 37 & 38
1997	Big Sky	Kerry Taylor	Season 1, episode 22
1997–2000	Home and Away	Joel Nash	Seasons 11–13 (lead cast - 340 episodes)
2000	Tales of the South Seas	Gambler	Seasons 1, episodes 4 & 9
2001	Spatch	Sparch	TV movie
2001–02	Crash Palace	Aaron	Season 1 (54 episodes)
2003	White Collar Blue	Howard Carter	Season 2, episode 16
2006	Two Twisted	Man	Season 1, episode 13
2009	Legend of the Seeker	Lord Callum	Season 2, episode 4
2010	Cops L.A.C.	Austen Chapman	Season 1, episode 5
2011	Ice	Fenwick	Miniseries (2 episodes)
2011	Spartacus: Gods of the Arena	Petronius	Miniseries (2 episodes)
2011	Wild Boys	Rope Gang #3 / Butler Gang #7	Season 1, episodes 9, 12 & 13
2013	Dance Academy	Marcus Kane	Season 3, episodes 3, 5, 12 & 13
2014	Rake	David Martin Wimmer	Season 3, episode 8
2014	Old School	Andy Cavendish	Season 1, episode 5
2014	AZIO: The Bogan Spy Agency	Detective Thomas	3 episodes
2015	Hiding	Hamish Wall	Season 1, episodes 3 & 7
2019	The Commons	Lou Denillo	Season 1, episode 3
2022	Joe vs. Carole	Sidney Pierce	Miniseries (2 episodes)
2022	Darby and Joan	Cameron	Season 1, episode 3

Non-acting work
Year	Title	Credit	Notes
1993	Time Trax	Stunt double	TV series (unknown episodes)
1998	Tales of the South Seas	Gambler	TV series (unknown episodes)
1998	The Thin Red Line	Stunt performer	Feature film
2001	The Last Espejo Cha Cha	Producer	Short
2001	Spatch	Producer	TV movie
2003	Merry-Go-Round	Producer	Short film
2003	Kangaroo Jack	Stunt driver, stunts	Feature film
2006	The Upside Down Show	Casting assistant	TV series (2 episodes)
2007	Sea Patrol	Casting assistant	TV series (1 episode)
2007	Prison Break	Casting assistant	TV series (1 episode)
2008	Out of the Blue	Casting assistant	TV series (1 episode)
2011	Wild Boys	Stunt double, stunt performer	TV series (3 episodes)
2013	The Key	Producer	Short film
2014	Ties	Producer	Short film
2014	Gayby	Stunts	Short film
