= Justine Welles =

- Home and Away character
- Portrayed by: Bree Desborough
- Duration: 1997–2000
- First appearance: 5 June 1997
- Last appearance: 7 April 2000
- Introduced by: John Holmes
In-universe information
- Occupation: Student at Summer Bay High (1997–99); Actress (2000–)
- Mother: Sharon Welles
- Half-brothers: Aaron Welles

Justine Welles is a fictional character from the Australian soap opera Home and Away, played by Bree Desborough. She made her first on-screen appearance on 5 June 1997 and departed on 7 April 2000.

== Casting ==
The character of Justine was Desborough's first on-going television role. Justine was initially a guest character and Desborough began filming her first scenes in March 1997. She returned as a permanent cast member the following month. In January 2000, it was announced Desborough had decided to leave Home and Away.

== Development ==
Justine and her brother Aaron (Richie Gudgeon) spent time on the city streets and Justine developed an addiction to drugs. Aaron felt he could not help Justine with her drug habit and ran away to Summer Bay. In 1997, Justine arrives in the Bay to visit Aaron and she tells him she is drug-free and wants to make a fresh start. It soon becomes obvious that the story is not true and as Aaron tries to help his sister, she runs away. Justine later returns and is placed in foster care with Pippa Ross (Debra Lawrance). The official Home and Away website said "This time Justine really is off drugs but she is still angry with Aaron—and the world in general. Despite her angry facade, this year Justine will show her more vulnerable side."

In 1999, Justine was accused of murdering Ruby Collins (Brittany Jones; Sian Tierney), a young child. The Home and Away writers scripted the storyline after being inspired by the real trials of Louise Woodward and Louise Sullivan. Desborough told Jason Herbison of Inside Soap that she was really excited to read the script and said it was a strong storyline to be working on. Justine decides to take up babysitting as a way of making extra money. She babysits Ruby Collins and notices there are bruises on her rib cage. She confronts Ruby's parents, but they throw her out of the house. Justine is shocked when the police turn up to question her about the child. Desborough explained "The cops arrive and tell Justine the baby is in a coma. They claim that she was in that state when Justine left, which simply isn't true - Justine heard her crying." Justine is taken to the station and changed with assault. Desborough told Annette Dasey of Inside Soap that the situation is "terribly frustrating" for Justine as she knows she did not do it.

Ruby later dies and despite all the gossip going around Summer Bay, Justine tries to hold her head up and decides to go to Ruby's funeral. Desborough said Justine was set to run away, but Rebecca Nash's (Belinda Emmett) attitude changes her plans. The actress said "Rebecca's beginning to think that Justine could be guilty, and Justine reckons the only way to prove her wrong is to stand up and face the music." Justine stands trial for Ruby's murder and the prosecution focuses on her failure to report the bruising she found on the baby. The jury find Justine guilty of manslaughter and she is sent to prison. Ruby's mother eventually comes forward and reveals her husband was actually responsible for their daughter's death. Justine is released and Desborough said she is too exhausted to feel relieved when she gets out and she is not in a party mood.

A writer for Inside Soap said it becomes apparent Justine's nightmare is far from over. A reporter turns up looking for her side of the story and her mother, Sharon (Shayne Francis), who tried to sell her story, also arrives. Desborough told the magazine, "Justine never wants to speak to her mother again, but she's not really sure how she feels about the newspaper offer." The actress said Justine wants to get her point of view across, but after what happened with her mother, she does not trust the press. Desborough revealed she had enjoyed filming the scenes, but was looking forward to a less traumatic storyline in the future. She explained "It was great working on the storyline, because I got to do so many things which challenged my acting abilities. But I think I've had more than my fair share of drama for a while."

== Storylines ==
Justine arrives in the bay and cons Marilyn Fisher (Emily Symons) and her stepdaughter, Rebecca out of money by telling them her baby is unwell and that she needs a taxi to get to the hospital. Aaron, Justine's brother then asks her what she is doing in the Bay. It soon becomes apparent that Justine is a heroin junkie and she begins stealing from Aaron's guardians Alf (Ray Meagher) and Ailsa Stewart (Judy Nunn). Justine tries to show she is a reformed character by organising a charity event at the surf club with boxer Kostya Tszyu as a guest, however, after the fundraiser, Justine secretly buys some drugs from a dealer. Aaron confronts Justine and accuses her of using drugs, which she denies. Alf and Ailsa's son, Duncan (Lewis Devaney) then discover syringes under Justine's bed and brings one into the dining room, prompting Alf to lose his temper and order Justine to leave. Aaron decides to leave with her and tries to help her by taking away a bag of drugs, but when he drops the bag in the diner, he is arrested. Justine then leaves Summer Bay after Aaron refuses to help her.

Justine returns several weeks later and is fostered by Pippa Ross. Justine has a new boyfriend— Danny Mackson, a drug dealer. Everyone tells her he is bad news, however, Justine refuses to believe this until Danny attacks Sam Marshall (Ryan Clark). Justine then causes problems at home by encouraging foster sister, Tiegan Brook (Sally Marrett) to shoplift, landing her in trouble. Alf later catches Justine stealing from his bait shop and makes it common knowledge. Justine, feeling like a pariah, decides to run away and steals a boat from the harbor and rows away. Everyone fears for her safety as Cyclone Raymond is approaching Summer Bay. Ian Routledge (Patrick Dickson) saves Justine and she expresses her gratitude to him.

Vinnie Patterson (Ryan Kwanten) takes an interest in Justine but Pippa does not approve of him. After Pippa leaves to be with Ian, Rebecca and her husband, Travis Nash (Nic Testoni) move into Summer Bay house and assume responsibility for Justine, Tiegan and Sam. When Justine asks Rebecca if Vinnie can stay over, she agrees but this decision causes controversy in the community but Rebecca does not back then. When the time comes, Vinnie declines and admits to Justine he is still a virgin. Justine later breaks up with Vinnie when she falls for Tom (Graeme Squires) during rehearsals for a Year 11 production of Romeo and Juliet.

Justine takes a job babysitting for Steve (Don Halbert) and Wendy Collins (Jayne Leslie), looking after their baby daughter, Ruby. Ruby suffers a fall and later dies. Justine is accused then, arrested and charged. Justine's mother Sharon reappears in her life claiming to support her but records Justine on tape saying she killed the baby. The case brought to trial and with Sharon's testimony, Justine found guilty of manslaughter and imprisoned. A week later, Steve comes forward and admits to causing Ruby's injuries and Justine is released. After completing her HSC, Justine secures a role in a stage play. The director, Curt Bacon (Michael Rowan) spends plenty of time rehearsing with Justine and anticipates a forthcoming scene where she is required to be naked. Justine soon sees through Curt's seedy intentions and improvises a scene on stage, exposing Curt's true nature. Justine then receives an offer of an acting job and she leaves the Bay several weeks later.

== Reception ==
For her portrayal of Justine, Desborough was nominated for "Most Popular New Talent" at the 1998 Logie Awards. An Inside Soap columnist criticised the writing of Justine's prison storyline. They believed it was rushed and detracted from the story's dramatic potential. They added "heaven forbid we should tell the writers how to do their jobs, but the story would have been far more dramatic if they had let her languish in prison for more than a fortnight."
