= Richard Grieve =

Australian actor

- Born: 25 January 1970 (age 56); Melbourne, Victoria, Australia
- Occupation: Actor
- Years active: 1988–present
- Notable work: Neighbours (1994–1996, 2005, 2025); Home and Away (1997–1998); Emmerdale (2007–2009)

Richard Grieve (born 25 January 1970) is an Australian actor, who has worked extensively in film, television, theatre and musical theatre, but is perhaps best known for his roles as Sam Kratz in Neighbours, Lachlan Fraser in Home and Away and Jonny Foster in British soap opera Emmerdale.

== Career ==
=== Australia ===
Grieve was born in Melbourne, and began his career in 1988 studying drama and dance at Victoria University. He then completed his formal training in Sydney, at the National Institute of Dramatic Art (NIDA). He joined the cast of Neighbours in 1994, playing the part of Sam Kratz until 1996, when he joined Home and Away, playing Dr Lachlan Fraser. His other television credits include The Man From Snowy River, the series, Newlyweds, E Street, State Coroner and Wintertime for the Australian Broadcasting Corporation.

He has performed with the State theatre companies of Australia. He played Julian in the Melbourne Theatre Company's production of Molière's The Misanthrope, the role of Otto in Noël Coward's Design For Living for the Sydney Theatre Company, and Chavalier in The Will for the Harold Park Theatre, also by Molière.

He has also performed in several musical theatre productions in Australia. He played Older Patrick in Mame, Greg Connell in the world premiere of The Boy From Oz, Prince Charming in Cinderella, and as Ovington in How To Succeed in Business Without Really Trying.

=== England ===
In October 2003, Grieve went to England to play the role of Gaston in Beauty & The Beast, and has since performed in the London premiere of Europe by Australian playwright Michael Gow at the Finborough Theatre, and in a showcase of the new musical Paradise by the Dashboard Lights. He toured the UK in a new stage production of Dial M For Murder by Frederick Knott, and also appeared in the lead role of Frederick Winterbourne in Daisy Miller, directed by Christopher Morahan.

In 2005, he filmed a cameo in London for Neighbours' 20th Anniversary. In 2006, he guest starred as James Clarke, a Forge operative, in the Doctor Who audio adventure, The Gathering and then as Major Brogan in the spin-off series I, Davros: Innocence.

He appeared in the world premiere of Teen Scream at the Theatre Royal, Lincoln and also at the 2006 Edinburgh Festival. From September to December 2006, Grieve toured the UK as the character of John Brotherston in the play There's No Place Like A Home.

Grieve toured the UK in Footloose, based on the hit 1980s film of the same name. He played Reverend Moore. He played Tick/Mitzi Del Bra in Priscilla: Queen of the Desert - The musical at the Palace Theatre in London. Grieve later played the lead role of Bernadette in the musical on tour.

==== Emmerdale ====
In February 2007 Grieve made a television comeback when he landed the role of farrier Jonny Foster in the rural-based British soap opera Emmerdale. His character set his sights on barman Paul Lambert, played by actor Mathew Bose, almost immediately on arrival and the two were together for several months. His character was also the centre of Emmerdale's first gay proposal when he asked Paul to marry him.

In 2009 Grieve reprised his role as Jonny Foster in Emmerdale, which coincided with his character's husband Paul Lambert's departure.

=== Charity work ===
In September 2009, Grieve played a politician in a viral video for Friends of the Earth, which aims to raise awareness of the dangers of intensive farming.

=== TV adverts ===
In 2013, Grieve starred in a January McDonald's advert playing the part of a pilot who purchases a £1.49 Double Cheeseburger, much to the delight of his crew and patient passengers.
