= Zac Drayson =

Australian actor

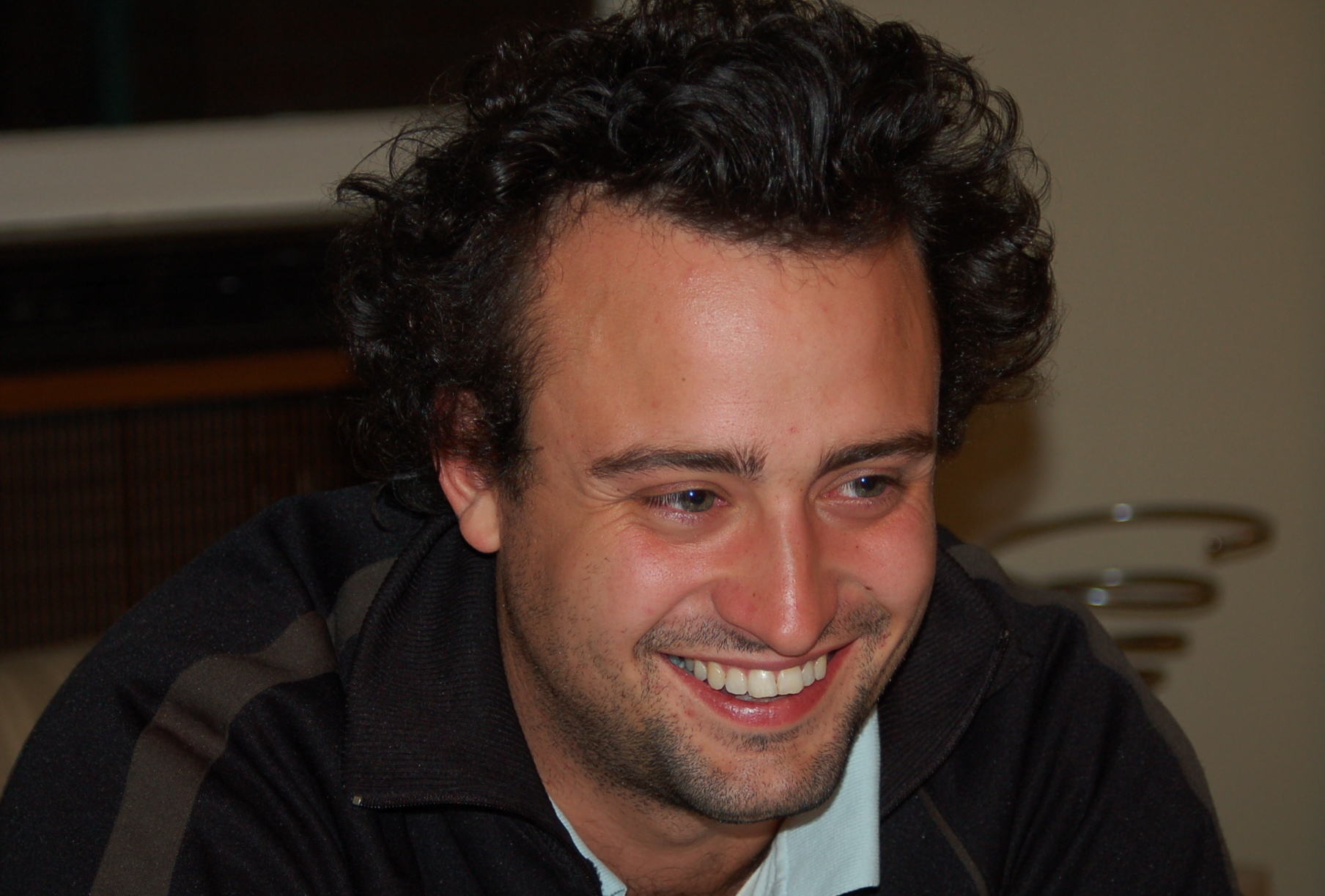
- Born: Zachary Lowell Drayson; 14 January 1983 (age 43); Sydney, New South Wales
- Occupation: Actor
- Years active: 1997–present
- Known for: Home and Away as Will Smith
- Spouse: Sabrina Drayson
- Children: 1

Zac Drayson (born 14 January 1983) is an Australian actor.

== Early life ==
Drayson was born Zachary Lowell Drayson in Sydney, New South Wales.

== Career ==
He is best known for the role of Will Smith, one of Irene Roberts' (Lynne McGranger) many foster children in the soap opera Home and Away. He was a regular from 1998–2002 and made occasional guest appearances from 2003 to 2005.

His character, Will, left Summer Bay after marrying the mother of his child Lily, Gypsy Nash (Kimberley Cooper). Will later returned to the Bay on a number of occasions to see his friends and family. His first being when brother Nick (Chris Egan) ran away as he was in trouble, he later returned after drifting apart from Gypsy. On this occasion Will hoped to win back his ex-girlfriend Dani Sutherland (Tammin Sursok) but she turned him down and told him to repair his rocky marriage. He also returned for his younger sister Hayley Lawson's (Bec Hewitt) wedding to Noah (Beau Brady). Drayson's more recent stints as Will have seen his character adopt Rachel McGregor, and the 4000th episode of the soap.

He also appeared in an episode of All Saints in 2006. He played a young boy stuck on a bus that had crashed with no hope of survival.

Drayson returned to Home and Away from 14 October 2010 to 7 February 2011.

== Personal life ==
Drayson's wife Sabrina gave birth to a son in 2015.

== Filmography ==
=== Film ===
Year	Title	Role	Notes	Ref.
1997	Girl	Jo	Short film	
2013	Let It Rain	Right Hand Man	Short film	
2016	Tender	Matt	Short film	
2018	The Marshes	Pig Hunter	Feature film	
2022	Carmen	Pete	Feature film	
2022	Learning the Curvature of the Earth	Dan	Short film	
2023	The Redemption	Bandit 1	Short film	

=== Television ===
Year	Title	Role	Notes	Ref.
1998–2002, 2003–05, 2010–11	Home and Away	Will Smith	Seasons 11–15 (main role); Seasons 16–18, 23–24 (recurring role)	
2002	Young Lions	Jay Stubbings	Season 1, episode 9	
2002	Always Greener	Devo	Season 2, episodes 3 & 10	
2006	All Saints	Billy Longley	Season 9, episode 34	
2009	Packed to the Rafters	Fergus	Season 2, episode 3	
2010	Rescue: Special Ops	Leroy	Season 2, episode 3	
2014	Town Centre	Stan	Webseries	
2015	Winter	Luke Thompson	Season 1 (recurring, 4 episodes)	
2018	Resting Pitch Face	Trevor	Season 1, episodes 2 & 3	
2022	The Secrets She Keeps	John Jones	Season 2, episodes 1 & 2	
2023	RFDS	Mobby	Season 2, episode 6	

=== As crew ===
Year	Title	Credit	Notes
2012	Underbelly	Grip	Season 5, episode 8
2013	Let It Rain	Grip	Short film
2015	Strangerland	Assistant grip	Feature film
2015	Home and Away: An Eye for an Eye	Assistant grip	Streaming special
2016	Factory Hands	Grip	Short film
2016	Doctor Doctor	Grip	Season 1, episodes 7 & 8
