= Ben Unwin =

Australian actor (1977–2019)

- Ben Unwin in TV series Home and Away as Jesse McGregor
- Born: Ben Denis Unwin; 15 August 1977; Sydney, New South Wales, Australia
- Died: 14 August 2019 (aged 41); Whian Whian State Conservation Area, New South Wales, Australia
- Occupations: Actor; senior solicitor
- Years active: 1991–2005 (acting)
- Notable work: Home and Away

Ben Denis Unwin (15 August 1977 – 14 August 2019) was an Australian actor, best known for portraying Jesse McGregor on the television soap opera Home and Away from 1996 until 2000, and again from 2002 to 2005.

For his portrayal of Jesse, Unwin in 1997 was nominated for the Logie Award for Most Popular New Talent, and for a British National Television Award for Most Popular Newcomer. After Home and Away, he completed a law degree and worked as a senior solicitor in Sydney and then in Newcastle.

Unwin was found dead on 14 August 2019, one day shy of his 42nd birthday, at his home in Minyon Falls, west of Byron Bay. Police would not consider his death, which was reported six days later on 20 August, to be suspicious.

== Filmography ==
Year	Title	Role	Notes
1991	Eggshells	Andrew	Main cast
1993	G.P.	Adam Storey	Episode: "Family Life"
1993	Home and Away	Eric	Season 6 (guest, 1 episode)
1995	Home and Away	Brat	Season 8 (guest, 1 episode)
1995	Home and Away	Taunt	Season 8 (guest, 2 episodes)
1996–2000, 2002–2005	Home and Away	Jesse McGregor	Seasons 9–13, 15–18 (main cast, 338 episodes)
