= Nic Testoni =

Australian actor

- Born: Nicolas John Testoni; 27 January 1972 (age 54); Wollongong, Australia
- Occupations: Actor; Television presenter
- Years active: 1992–2004
- Awards: Logie Award

Nicolas John Testoni, billed as Nic Testoni (born 27 January 1972) is an Australian actor and television presenter. He took the role of Travis Nash on the soap opera Home and Away from 1995 to 1999. He won the Most Popular New Talent category at the Logie Awards of 1996.

== Early life ==
Upon finishing school in 1989 Testoni took up an offer from a modelling agency and worked in Europe and Japan. He began his television career in 1992 co-hosting Network Ten's youth music show, Level 23.

== Career ==
In 1992, he was cast to co-host Network Ten's youth music show, Level 23. In 1993, he was one of the principal cast in the television comedy, Over the Hill. In 1995, Testoni commenced his role of Travis Nash in TV soap opera, Home and Away in 1995. In 1996 he co-hosted Sydney Children's Hospital Telethon alongside Julia Morris, and Space Probe 7 with Melissa George for Seven Network. In that year Testoni won the Most Popular New Talent category at the Logie Awards of 1996 for his work on Home and Away. He was also a guest presenter and producer on ABC's Recovery.

In 1997 Testoni was chosen as ambassador for the NSW Epilepsy Association. In 2000 he had a guest role in the Canadian science fiction, fantasy television series, Beastmaster. He wrote and produced the documentary film, Mr Patterns (2004), which depicts the teaching work of Geoff Bardon, it broadcast on ABC-TV in 2005. It was screened at the 2004 Melbourne International Film Festival, where Testoni received the Award for Emerging Australian Filmmaker.

== Filmography ==
Nic Testoni acting credits
Year	Title	Role	Notes	Ref.
1993	Over the Hill	Jeremy	Principal cast	
1995–1999	Home and Away	Travis Nash	Regular role	
2000	Beastmaster	Nord Foreman	Episode: "Tao's Brother" (S2.E12)	
