= Shauna Bradley =

Fictional character from Home and Away

- Home and Away character
- Portrayed by: Kylie Watson
- Duration: 1999–2002
- First appearance: 16 August 1999
- Last appearance: 18 July 2002
- Introduced by: Russell Webb
In-universe information
- Occupation: Lifeguard; Teacher
- Mother: Ailsa Stewart
- Adoptive father: Bill Bradley
- Adoptive mother: Margaret Bradley
- Stepfather: Alf Stewart
- Brothers: Aidan Bradley (adoptive)
- Half-brothers: Duncan Stewart
- Grandfathers: Harold O'Rourke
- Uncles: Tony O'Rourke
- Aunts: Bridget Jackson; Kate O'Connor
- First cousins: Emma Jackson; Troy Jackson; Justin Jackson

Shauna Bradley is a fictional character from the Australian television soap opera Home and Away, played by Kylie Watson. The actress received an audition for Home And Away in February 1999, but decided not to attend it as she did not think she would be successful. However, her agent persuaded her to go and she won the role of Shauna. As the part was her first acting job, Watson's agent booked her onto some acting classes and she began filming her first scenes in June. Watson made her first appearance as Shauna during the episode broadcast on 16 August 1999, Watson decided to leave Home and Away in 2001 and filmed her final scenes in June 2001, Shauna's final scenes aired on 5 October 2001. Watson returned for a brief stint in early 2002 and made her final appearance on 18 July 2002.

Shauna gained a natural skill for lifesaving and went on to compete in various competitions, before progressing to professional lifesaving. When she moved to Summer Bay, Shauna became the town's first resident lifesaver. The character was described as being confident, strong and athletic. Shauna developed relationships with Harry Reynolds (Justin Melvey) and Jude Lawson (Ben Steel), who she later became engaged to. During her time in the show, Shauna began an affair with a married man, learned she was adopted and discovered she had a serious heart condition. Watson earned a nomination for Most Popular New Female Talent at the Logie Awards for her portrayal of Shauna.

== Casting ==
In February 1999, shortly after she had moved back to Canberra, Watson landed an audition for Home And Away. She initially decided not to attend the audition because she did not think she would get the part. However, her agent told her to go and she won the role of Shauna. Watson revealed "Suddenly I had this opportunity thrown at me, that I'd always dreamed of, and I felt great. I came back to Sydney to start filming in June." As Home and Away was her first acting job, Watson's agent booked her into some acting classes. She commented "I think I was really bad, to be honest, at the beginning. But like anything if you really put your mind to it and love what you do, you invest the time to grow and educate yourself and I did do that." Watson made her first appearance as Shauna in August that same year.

== Development ==
=== Characterisation ===
Shauna's "natural skill and ability" at lifesaving began when she was five. She then entered various competitions during her teenage years and progressed to the professional lifesaving circuit. Shauna was working as a professional lifesaver for three years before she arrived in Summer Bay and applied for the job at the surf club. A writer for the official Home and Away website revealed that Shauna chose to leave her previous job because she was having trouble with her flatmate. Vinnie Patterson (Ryan Kwanten) hires Shauna, much to Alf Stewart's (Ray Meagher) surprise. An Inside Soap reporter commented that the last thing Alf expected was for Vinnie to employ a woman, least of all one "as feisty" as Shauna. Shauna's new job saw her become the Bay's first resident lifesaver. Watson described her character as extremely confident and not one to take any nonsense from guys. The Daily Mirror's Nina Myskow commented "Strong and athletic, Shauna is not one to be pushed around."

=== Family ===
Shauna is surprised when her aunt, Kate O'Connor (Kris McQuade), comes to the Bay for a visit and she later starts to suspect that she is adopted. Shauna's mother, Margaret (Sonja Tallis), also comes to the Bay and Shauna asks her why she does not have any baby photos of her. Margaret tries to deflect the question by telling her that she did not have a camera then, but Shauna calls her a liar. Margaret later reveals that she did indeed adopt her, but does not know who her real mother is. Shortly after, Ailsa Stewart (Judy Nunn) reveals to Shauna that she is her biological mother. Ailsa tells Shauna that she was conceived while she was in prison. She was raped by a warden and her cellmate, Kate, organised for her sister to adopt Shauna. A reporter for Inside Soap quipped "Shauna is stunned, asking Ailsa why she hid the truth for long. Ailsa bluffs, saying she didn't think Shauna would want a murderer for a mum."

When Ailsa suddenly dies of a heart attack, Shauna is glad that she got to spend a brief time with her. Watson told Herbison "Shauna only discovered that Ailsa was her mum a few months ago, so in her case, she's terribly sad but at the same time grateful that they were able to spend some time together." During the funeral, Shauna says a few words about the time she had with Ailsa and she is able to "feel satisfied" that they parted on good terms. Shauna's older brother, Aidan Bradley (Ben Mortley), comes to the Bay. He ends up "copping a serve" from his sister because he has left behind a broken engagement and kissed Hayley Smith (Bec Hewitt).

=== Relationships ===
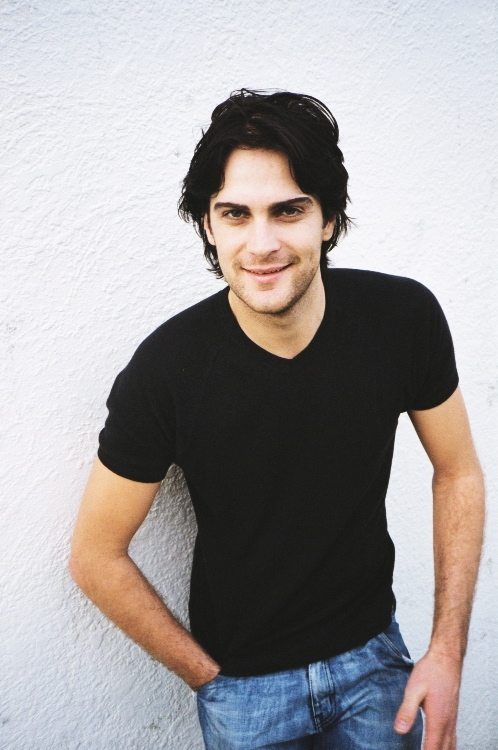
Ben Steel portrayed Shauna's love interest, Jude Lawson.

A physical attraction develops between Shauna and Harry Reynolds (Justin Melvey), which eventually turns into a "rocky romance". Shauna realises that Harry is keeping a secret and her instincts tell her that she cannot trust him. Watson stated that the most important elements in a relationship are honesty and respect, so Shauna decides to back off from him for a while. Watson told an All About Soap journalist "The relationship between Harry and Shauna is interesting because it hasn't been easy. There are lots of things they need to overcome and if they can do that, hopefully people will like to see them get together by the end of it all." Harry's ex-fiancée, Alison (Jenny Apostolou), comes to the Bay and informs Shauna that she intends to fight her for Harry. Shauna chooses to give Harry some space and he eventually chooses to stay with her.

Shauna meets Gavin Campbell (Kim De Lury) when he stops a man from harassing her on the beach. Gavin flirts with Shauna, but he is interrupted by the arrival of his wife and daughter. Shauna is "unimpressed" with him, but Gavin later explains that he is staying in an unhappy marriage because he does not want to lose his daughter. Shauna agrees to go to a concert with him as a friend and she manages to resist his advances. However, she later begins an affair with him. When Shauna decides to end the affair with Gavin, she suffers "a humiliating public showdown" with his wife.

Shauna begins dating Jude Lawson (Ben Steel). When he asks her to move in with him, she refuses due to her fear of commitment. Watson explained that because Shauna's relationship with Harry ended badly, there is a part of her that worries her relationship with Jude will go the same way. When he asks her to move in, she panics and states that she is not ready. Shauna's reaction makes Jude question whether she is serious about them and their future, while she tells Sally Fletcher (Kate Ritchie) that she loves him but is afraid to next step in case it does not work out. The next time Shauna sees Jude, she blurts out that she while she does not want to live him she would like to marry him. Despite the impulsive proposal, Jude does not need time to think and he accepts.

Watson told Inside Soap's Jason Herbison, "Jude is over the moon about it, and the next morning, word gets out and everyone knows they are engaged. Meanwhile, there's a part of Shauna that thinks 'oh, no, what have I done?' However, Jude is convinced it will work out, which kinds of peps her up too." When Shauna confesses that her major fear about married life is losing the spark in their relationship, Jude organises a romantic breakfast for them on a boat. Shauna thinks the gesture is a great way to celebrate their engagement, however the date turns into a disaster. The sea becomes rough and when Jude goes to put the sail up, he is hit by the mast and falls overboard. Shauna realises that Jude could drown, as he has fallen unconscious, but any strenuous activity could put pressure on her pacemaker. Shauna decides to rescue Jude, but when she gets him back on deck, she starts having breathing difficulties. Jude wakes up and he has to hurry to get them back to dry land, so Shauna can see a doctor.

=== Heart condition ===
When Shauna collapses after a run, hospital tests reveal that she has a serious heart defect. Watson explained "Shauna's condition is called hypertrophic cardiomyopathy. It's generally found in athletes when there's too much pressure on the heart." The actress revealed that Shauna is shocked because sport and her job as a lifeguard mean everything to her. She is prevented from assisting in rescues and has to undergo surgery to have a pacemaker fitted. Shauna then learns that the condition is hereditary, meaning she could pass it on to her children. Her family also need to be tested and Watson described the situation as "a total nightmare for Shauna."

== Storylines ==
Shauna arrives in Summer Bay and applies for a permanent lifesaver job. Vinnie Patterson conducts the interview and he hires Shauna because she is attractive. However, she also turns out to be good at the job. Adam Cameron (Mat Stevenson) flirts with Shauna and suggests she move into the spare room at the place he is staying. Shortly after she moves in, Shauna finds someone is stealing her clothes and watching her. She suspects Adam and the new high school teacher, Harry, until the culprit is revealed to be her old flatmate, Jillian Williams (Alexandra Davies). Shauna develops feelings for Harry and they begin dating. When Christian (John Atkinson), a hitman, is sent after Harry, he reveals that he is a research scientist in witness protection. Christian takes Shauna hostage, but she and Harry manage to overcome him. Harry's ex-fiancée, Alison, arrives in the Bay and declares her intention to get Harry back. Shauna refuses to fight Alison for Harry and he ultimately decides to stay with her. Shauna asks Harry to move out of the share house when he humiliates her during a self-defence demonstration and she invites Sally Fletcher and Leah Poulos (Ada Nicodemou) to move in.

Shauna's aunt Kate comes to stay, followed by her mother, Margaret. Shauna asks why there are no baby pictures of her and Margaret confesses that she adopted her. Knowing that Kate knew Ailsa Stewart, Shauna realises Ailsa is her biological mother. Ailsa admits that she fell pregnant with Shauna in prison and gave her to Kate to raise, but Kate agreed to let Margaret and her husband adopt her instead. Shauna eventually bonds with Ailsa and her brother, Duncan (Brendan McKensy). Harry and Shauna break up and she begins an affair with Gavin Campbell. When Gavin's wife, Alicia (Caroline Brazier) is found dead, both Shauna and Gavin suspect each other of killing her. Before they can make up, a landslide buries the Stewart house. Gavin helps rescue Shauna, Ailsa, Duncan and Jade Sutherland (Kate Garven), but he dies when the house is destroyed. While out running one day, Shauna collapses. She is diagnosed with a heart condition that requires her to have a pacemaker fitted.

Ailsa dies of a heart attack and Shauna is grateful for the time they spent together. Shauna begins a relationship with Jude Lawson and works hard to bond with his brother, Noah (Beau Brady). While Alf lets Shauna stay on the life saving team, he forbids her to take part in any rescues due to her heart condition. She eventually resigns and decides to take up teaching. Shauna is stalked by Kane Phillips (Sam Atwell) and kidnapped by his brother, Scott (Nathaniel Dean). Kane realises Scott intends to kill Shauna and he unties her. Jude asks Shauna to move in with him, but she asks him to marry her instead. Shauna develops feelings for Flynn Saunders (Martin Dingle-Wall) and she tries to make a move on him. However, Flynn is not interested. Jude becomes angry with Shauna and she decides to take a job in Melbourne. A year later, Shauna returns to the Bay to take care of Alf after he suffers a heart attack. Although Jude is dating Charlotte Adams (Stephanie Chaves-Jacobsen), he and Shauna realise they still have feelings for each other and get back together, before departing for Melbourne.

== Reception ==
For her portrayal of Shauna, Watson earned a nomination for Most Popular New Female Talent at the 2000 Logie Awards. Karman Kregloe of AfterEllen called Shauna "sassy", while The People's Sharon Marshall branded her "feisty". Andrew Mercado, author of Super Aussie Soaps, said Shauna was a "sexy lifesaver". A writer for Inside Soap commented that Shauna's relationship with Harry had "more ups and downs than a kangaroo on a trampoline." While their colleague proclaimed that she played with fire when she got involved with Gavin. In 2012, Channel 5 shortlisted the episode in which Shauna confronts Margaret and learns she is adopted for their "From Day One" feature, which saw viewers vote for their favourite episodes.
