= Harry Reynolds (Home and Away) =

- Home and Away character
- Portrayed by: Justin Melvey
- Duration: 1999–2001
- First appearance: 13 September 1999
- Last appearance: 26 January 2001
- Introduced by: John Holmes
In-universe information
- Other names: Harry Keller (Undercover name)
- Occupation: Charter pilot Research scientist Teacher
- Father: Frank Reynolds
- Mother: June Reynolds
- Uncles: Des

Harry Reynolds (also Keller) is a fictional character from the Australian soap opera Home and Away, played by Justin Melvey. He made his first on-screen appearance on 13 September 1999 and departed on 26 January 2001.

== Casting ==
Prior to joining Home and Away, Melvey's career involved modelling, studying and improving his acting skills. When Melvey decided to "lay some grassroots", the opportunity to play Harry Reynolds in Home and Away came up. Of this Melvey said "I flew back to Sydney and auditioned for the role on a Thursday, found out I had it the following Monday, and then had to go back to LA to do a hair commercial on Tuesday. After that, I basically had to pack up my life, say goodbye to my friends and move back to Australia."

== Development ==
In one storyline Harry's ex-girlfriend Alison (Jenny Apostolou) arrives. Melvey told a writer from TV Week that he and Apostolou had been friends since high school and used to have a crush on one another; so "it was quite funny" working with her on Home and Away.

== Storylines ==
Harry arrives as the new Science teacher at Summer Bay High, under the name "Harry Keller". His way of teaching is more informal and slightly less disciplined. Harry is accused of stalking Shauna Bradley (Kylie Watson), who has experienced a number of unsettling incidents including having her clothes stolen from the washing line. The culprit is Jillian Williams (Alexandra Davies), Shauna's ex-flatmate who has fixated on her as a kind of role model. Shauna apologises to Harry and invites him to move in with her and James Fraser (Michael Piccirilli). Harry develops feelings for Shauna and admits his real name is actually Harry Reynolds and he is a research scientist. It emerges that Harry discovered illegal activities by his employers while working in America and had alerted the authorities and ended up in Witness Protection until he could testify. Just as Harry is about to fly out to the States, Christian (John Atkinson), a hitman is sent after him and Shauna is hostage. Against the orders of his police escort, Harry goes after Christian and together he and Shauna manage to overpower him. Harry then spends night with Shauna before departing for the trial.

Harry returns to Summer Bay and begins using his real name, partly in order to renew his relationship with Shauna. Alison, Harry's ex-fiancée, arrives in the Bay, aiming to pick up where they left off. Shauna refuses to compete for him so Harry agrees to return to the States with Alison, only to change his mind halfway to the airport. After getting out of their taxi and saying goodbye to Alison, Harry is picked up by Shauna, who had changes her mind and tells him how she feels.

Dating an independent woman like Shauna is a challenge for Harry as he learns when he pays off her credit card bill. They also clash whilst organising a self-defense class together; Harry is annoyed by her constantly knocking him down heavily in a demonstration, Harry reverses the move and overpowers her. The strain is too much and Shauna asks Harry to move out and he persuades Donald Fisher (Norman Coburn) to let him lodge at his place. Harry faces more problems when one of his pupils, Claire Rogers (Jaime Mears), develops a crush on him and claims they are having a relationship. But Sam Marshall (Ryan Clark), who has feelings for Claire, persuades her to reveal the truth. Harry's mother June (Rowena Wallace) arrives to visit him and he is horrified when she goes on at date with Donald. Matters are not helped when a novel based on her life does not paint his late father in the best light but comes to accept June's point of view.

Harry supports Shauna when she finds out Ailsa Stewart (Judy Nunn) is her mother and was one of the first to learn she had been conceived when Ailsa was raped in prison (Harry learned some months before Shauna herself found out). However, their relationship hits a wall when Shauna feels the need to criticise her flatmate Leah Poulos' (Ada Nicodemou) relationship with Vinnie Patterson (Ryan Kwanten). Harry is annoyed with her meddling and ironically, they are the ones who break up. In the wake of his split with Shauna, Harry decides to give up teaching and buy back his motorbike he sold in order to please Shauna. He also purchases a seaplane and sets up his own charter flight business. After falling out with Donald, Harry moves in with Vinnie and Gypsy Nash (Kimberley Cooper) . Many in the Bay, including Gypsy's father Joel (David Woodley), believe that Harry is having an affair with his former pupil. Both of them strenuously deny it until fiction becomes fact.

Gypsy receives a phone call that Harry has been killed in a plane crash, which is later found to be a hoax, as someone is stalking them. Harry helps out a girl named Kirsten (Christa Nichola) whose car had broken down and it results in Joel finding her half-dressed in the front room. Gypsy apparently breaks up with Harry as a result but it is all an act to trap Kirsten, the stalker, who blamed Gypsy for the death of her ex-boyfriend, Charlie Nicholas (Toby Schmitz) in a car crash several months earlier. Harry and Gypsy get things back on track but Gypsy is jealous when she finds that Harry still has a photo of Shauna. Harry and Shauna deny it but Harry later admits that he still loves Shauna, which Leah overhears and tells Gypsy, prompting her to throw him out. Harry continues with his quest to win Shauna back but is annoyed when she begins a new relationship with Jude Lawson (Ben Steel). Sally Fletcher (Kate Ritchie) lectures him about his behaviour, he kisses her purely to prove anyone could be tempted. June returns with the news she is setting up a holiday resort in the Whitsundays and wants him to help her. Harry takes her up on the offer after alienating most of his friends in the bay and after neither Shauna or Gypsy are prepared to accept his apology, he leaves with June in the seaplane.

== Reception ==
In 2000, Melvey won the "Most Popular New Male Talent" Logie Award for his portrayal of Harry. The Herald Sun critic Jackie Brygel was a fan of the character, stating "The very handsome Harry – also known to Soapdish as simply 'the hunk' – makes a monumental life decision this week that will shock one and all in Summer Bay. And we're talking at least, oooh, 15 people."
