= Jude Lawson =

Fictional character in Home and Away

- Home and Away character
- Portrayed by: Ben Steel
- Duration: 2000–02
- First appearance: 30 October 2000
- Last appearance: 12 September 2002
In-universe information
- Occupation: Cleaner
- Mother: Jill Lawson
- Brothers: Noah Lawson

Jude Lawson is a fictional character in the Australian soap opera Home and Away played by actor Ben Steel. He first appeared on-screen during the episode airing on 30 October 2000 and departed on 12 September 2002.

== Storylines ==
Jude is the elder of two sons born to Jill Lawson (Tracy Mann). After his father walked out on them when he was 12, Jill became obsessed with religion and believed both Jude and his younger brother, Noah (Beau Brady) were possessed by demons. Jude left home at 16 and dropped out of high school. He returned for Noah when he was old enough to take responsibility. Jude began his own cleaning business in order to support them while attending night classes at TAFE in order to achieve a legal degree.

Jude is first seen when he plans to start a surf shop only to learn that it has been leased to Alf (Ray Meagher) and Ailsa Stewart (Judy Nunn) as the new diner. Jude meets Ailsa's daughter Shauna Bradley (Kylie Watson) and they begin spending time together. It seems as at first that Shauna is trying to avoid her ex-boyfriend Harry Reynolds (Justin Melvey) but she feels the same as Jude. When Ailsa dies, Jude supports Shauna in her grief.

Holly Loader (Clare Flanaghan), Jude's ex-girlfriend arrives in Summer Bay and he is shocked when he learns that She and Noah had slept together while they were going out. Jude is incensed and throws Noah out but later comes to realise that Holly took advantage of Noah and sends her packing. Just as Jude rebuilds his relationship with his brother, Noah descends into alcoholism and Jill returns. Jill tries to influence Hayley Smith (Bec Cartwright) with her beliefs and Jude, Noah and Hayley's guardian Irene Roberts (Lynne McGranger) are concerned. It becomes apparent that Jill is in need of psychological help and Jude and Noah agree to forgive her after she leaves to get help.

When Irene is hassled by a group of thugs working for property developer Dennis Scott, Jude steps in and able to fight them off. Jude's quickness with his fists lands him in trouble when he is accused of beating up Kane Phillips (Sam Atwell), one of Shauna's students. Jude is later cleared of any wrongdoing when it emerges Kane's brother, Scott (Nathaniel Dean) is the culprit. After Shauna is kidnapped by Scott, Jude rescues her and he asks her to move in with him. Shauna turns down his offer but proposes to him and he accepts

Anna Miller, one of Jude's cleaning employees, dies of cancer and Jude offers her son Seb (Mitch Firth) a place to live. Jude makes another new friend in new counsellor and doctor, Flynn Saunders (Martin Dingle-Wall). When Noah and Seb suspect that Flynn and Shauna are having an affair, Jude is shocked and confronts Flynn. Shauna tells Jude that she made a pass at Flynn and he turned her down. Jude ride off on his motorbike in a rage and crashes, suffering severe injuries. Flynn and trainee doctor, Charlotte Adams (Stephanie Chaves-Jacobsen) battle to save him and are successful. Shauna leaves town and Jude is left feeling down. He makes a pass at Gypsy Nash (Kimberley Cooper), which neither of them take very seriously.

When Charlotte becomes Jude's new neighbour, they become very close and he supports her during her trauma with abusive boyfriend Steve Kent and helps Charlotte look after her grandmother, Gladys (Moya O’Sullivan), who is suffering from Alzheimer's.

After developing feelings for one another, Jude and Charlotte become a couple and when Charlotte falls pregnant with twins, Jude is shocked. He confides in Noah that he likes Charlotte but doesn't love her. Charlotte is prepared to raise the babies alone until Jude tells her he is committed to her. Charlotte miscarries and the couple hold a memorial service with their friends present.

Jude's world is then rocked when Shauna returns to the Bay to help care for Alf, who has recently suffered a heart attack. Jude still realises he has feelings for Shauna and she is still in love with him. Jude breaks the news to Charlotte and an angry Noah and he leaves with Shauna to go to Melbourne.

When Charlotte nearly drowns several months later, she sees a vision of Jude under and begins asking for him while in hospital. Josh West (Daniel Collopy), who rescued Charlotte, arranges for a helicopter to fly Jude to the bay. Jude notices Charlotte is suffering from delusions, believing that they are still a couple and the twins are still alive. Jude goes along with this and remains at Charlotte's side, shortly before she dies of complications following her accident.

Jude learns that Charlotte has not changed her will following their split and inherits her entire estate including a large sum that one of her patients left her. With Alf's help, Jude uses the funds to finance an orphanage in Vietnam, where Charlotte had planned to go to work before she died. Jude then leaves to return to Shauna in Melbourne.

== Reception ==
For his portrayal of Jude, Steel was nominated for the "Best New Male Talent" Logie Award in 2001.
