= List of Home and Away characters introduced in 1999 =

Home and Away is an Australian soap opera first broadcast on the Seven Network on 17 January 1988. The following is a list of characters that first appeared on the show in 1999, by order of first appearance. They were all introduced by the show's execution producer at the time, John Holmes. The 12th season of Home and Away began airing on 11 January 1999 The first introduction of the year was Nick Smith, played by Matt Juarez in March. Nick's father Ken, played by Anthony Phelan debuted in April. Aleetza Wood began playing Peta Janossi in May. Cameron Welsh arrived as Mitch McColl in July. Bianca Zeboat and lifeguard Shauna Bradley, played by Kylie Watson, were introduced in August. Science teacher Harry Reynolds, played by Justin Melvey arrived in September. Anna Hruby and Stephen James King joined the cast as acting principal Judith Ackroyd and her son, Edward Dunglass, respectively in October.

== Opening titles cast timeline ==
Color key
Main cast (opening credits)
Recurring guest star (closing credits in 3+ episodes)
Guest star (closing credits in 1–2 episodes)

| Character | Actor | 1999 | | | | | |
| Character | Actor | 2526–2570 | 2571–2615 | 2616–2680 | 2681–2685 | 2686–2735 | 2736–2755 |
|---|---|---|---|---|---|---|---|
| Sally Fletcher | Kate Ritchie | M | M | M | M | M | M |
| Ailsa Stewart | Judy Nunn | M | M | M | M | M | M |
| Alf Stewart | Ray Meagher | M | M | M | M | M | M |
| Donald Fisher | Norman Coburn | M | M | M | M | M | M |
| Sam Marshall | Ryan Clark | M | M | M | M | M | M |
| Irene Roberts | Lynne McGranger | M | M | M | M | M | M |
| Marilyn Chambers | Emily Symons | M | M | M | M | M | M |
| Travis Nash | Nic Testoni | M | M | M | | | |
| Chloe Richards | Kristy Wright | M | M | M | | | |
| Joey Rainbow | Alex O'Han | M | M | | | | |
| Jesse McGregor | Ben Unwin | M | M | M | M | M | M |
| Rebecca Fisher | Belinda Emmett | M | M | M | | | |
| Tiegan Brook | Sally Marrett | M | | | | | |
| Justine Welles | Bree Desborough | M | M | M | M | M | M |
| Vinnie Patterson | Ryan Kwanten | M | M | M | M | M | M |
| Joel Nash | David E. Woodley | M | M | M | M | M | M |
| Natalie Nash | Antoinette Byron | M | M | M | M | M | M |
| Gypsy Nash | Kimberley Cooper | M | M | M | M | M | M |
| Will Smith | Zac Drayson | M | M | M | M | M | M |
| Tom Nash | Graeme Squires | M | M | M | M | M | M |
| Hayley Smith | Rebecca Cartwright | M | M | M | M | M | M |
| James Fraser | Michael Piccirilli | M | M | M | R | M | M |
| Duncan Stewart | Brendan McKensy (Note: McKensy's name is misspelled as "McKensey" in the opening credits of episodes 2681–2685.) | R | R | R | M | M | M |
| Peta Janossi | Aleetza Wood | | | R | M | M | M |
| Mitch McColl | Cameron Welsh | | | R | R | R | M |

== Nick Smith ==
Nick Smith first appeared during the episode airing on 18 March 1999, played by Matt Guarez in a guest role and then returned as a regular character in 2000 played by Chris Egan and departed on 9 September 2003. Aaron Puckeridge also played Nick in flashbacks in 2003. For his portrayal of Nick, Egan was nominated for "Best New Male Talent" at the Logie Awards in 2001.

== Peta Janossi ==
Peta Janossi, portrayed by Aleetza Wood, debuted on the series on 27 May 1999 and departed on 14 July 2000. Wood won the role while studying at University. While filming with co-star Zac Drayson, Wood was approached by some fans. "I was filming on location when I first started on Home and Away and there were some English tourists asking Zac for autographs. They then turned to me and they all asked me for my autograph; I had no idea what to do or write. I actually think I was more nervous than they were". Series Producer Russell Webb chose Wood for the role of Peta due to her "fresh-faced" look. For her portrayal of Peta, Wood was nominated for a "Most Popular New Female Talent" award in 2000.

== Mitch McColl ==
Mitch McColl, played by Cameron Welsh, debuted on-screen during the episode airing on 15 July 1999. Welsh auditioned for the role with the predicate that it would only be a guest role. In 2000, Welsh was diagnosed with a herniated disc in his back and was ordered to take bed rest. Producers granted Welsh a six-week break but decided to hire Mitchell McMahon to play Mitch in his absence. Welsh said it felt "weird" seeing another actor playing Mitch but as he was involved in a "big storyline" at the time, producers were left with no other option. After his return, Welsh's scenes as Mitch started airing once again from 3 April 2000. In 2005, Welsh filmed a cameo for the serial's 4000th episode, which saw Mitch return for Alf Stewart's (Ray Meagher) birthday. Welsh later became Home and Away's producer. He said that playing Mitch helped give him a better understanding when it came to producing the serial. For his portrayal of Mitch, Welsh was nominated for the "Best New Male Talent" Logie Award in 2000. James Joyce of The Newcastle Herald said that Mitch made a big impact in his first episode on-screen. He later opined that Mitch and Hayley's first kiss was "long-awaited" and had that the pair had "lustful eyes" for one another. When they face "frustration" after the kiss, he added that fans "crave this sort of teasing". A columnist for the Daily Record chose Mitch's exit as one of their TV highlights of the week.

== Bianca Zeboat ==
Bianca Zeboat
- Home and Away character
- Portrayed by: Lara Cox
- First appearance: 11 August 1999
- Last appearance: 10 September 1999
In-universe information
- Occupation: Actress and model

Bianca Zeboat, played by Lara Cox, made her first appearance on 11 August 1999. Cox won the extended guest role of Bianca shortly after she finished filming on fellow serial drama Heartbreak High, and was surprised that she would be appearing in two shows at the same time. Cox compared Bianca to her Heartbreak High character Anita Scheppers, saying "I have more in common with Anita than Bianca. While Anita is basically good, Bianca is a nasty, nasty piece of work! I don't like her at all." Cox also called Bianca a "manipulator", and said she would never behave in the same way or be as sexually overt as her. But she thought Bianca was quite assertive and strong, which was something Anita could benefit from. An Inside Soap writer commented, "The moment Bianca steps into the Summer Bay Diner, it's clear she's trouble."

Bianca is a model and actress, who is keen to get the lead role in the film adaptation of Alan Fisher's (Simon Bossell) 1989 novel On the Crest of a Wave. She arrives in Summer Bay ahead of filming and befriends Jesse McGregor (Ben Unwin), in the hope of gaining some inside information about the role. Jesse is "besotted" by Bianca, and Unwin said that his character cannot see her bad side, as he is looking for a partner and mother figure for his daughter. The film's director Roger Landowne (Tony Bonner) fires Bianca and recasts her role. She immediately breaks up with Jesse and leaves the Bay.

== Shauna Bradley ==
Shauna Bradley, played by Kylie Watson, made her first screen appearance during the episode broadcast on 16 August 1999 and departed in July 2002. In February 1999, shortly after she had moved back to Canberra, Watson landed an audition for Home And Away. She initially decided not to attend the audition because she did not think she would get the part. However, her agent told her to go and she won the role of Shauna. Watson revealed "Suddenly I had this opportunity thrown at me, that I'd always dreamed of, and I felt great. I came back to Sydney to start filming in June." As Home and Away was her first acting job, Watson's agent booked her into some acting classes. She commented "I think I was really bad, to be honest, at the beginning. But like anything if you really put your mind to it and love what you do, you invest the time to grow and educate yourself and I did do that." Watson made her first appearance as Shauna in August that same year. For her portrayal of Shauna, Watson earned a nomination for Most Popular New Female Talent at the 2000 Logie Awards. Karman Kregloe of AfterEllen called Shauna "sassy", while The People's Sharon Marshall branded her "feisty". Andrew Mercado, author of Super Aussie Soaps, said Shauna was a "sexy lifesaver". A writer for Inside Soap commented that Shauna's relationship with Harry had "more ups and downs than a kangaroo on a trampoline." While their colleague proclaimed that she played with fire when she got involved with Gavin. In 2012, Channel 5 shortlisted the episode in which Shauna confronts Margaret and learns she is adopted for their "From Day One" feature, which saw viewers vote for their favourite episodes.

== Harry Reynolds ==
Harry Reynolds, played by Justin Melvey, made his first appearance on 13 September 1999 and departed on 26 January 2001. Prior to joining the serial, Melvey's career involved modelling, studying and improving his acting skills. When Melvey decided to "lay some grassroots", the opportunity to play Harry Reynolds in Home and Away came up. Of this Melvey said "I flew back to Sydney and auditioned for the role on a Thursday, found out I had it the following Monday, and then had to go back to LA to do a hair commercial on Tuesday. After that, I basically had to pack up my life, say goodbye to my friends and move back to Australia." In 2000, Melvey won the "Most Popular New Male Talent" Logie Award for his portrayal of Harry.

== Judith Ackroyd ==
Judith Ackroyd
- Home and Away character
- Portrayed by: Anna Hruby
- Duration: 1999–2000
- First appearance: 21 October 1999
- Last appearance: 21 November 2000
In-universe information
- Occupation: Principal of Summer Bay High
- Sons: Edward Dunglass
- First cousins: Margaret

Judith Ackroyd, portrayed by actress Anna Hruby, made her first appearance on 21 October 1999 and departed on 21 November 2000. Prior to starring in Home and Away, Hruby had previously played Paddy Lawson on Prisoner Cell Block H. Commenting on the demise of Judith's relationship with Joel Nash (David Woodley), Jackie Brygel of the Herald Sun quipped "Gee, that Judith's a smart cookie. After all, we're talking about a woman who this week very, very slowly comes to realise that maybe, just maybe, her relationship with Joel might be over. And what has finally brought Judith to this conclusion? Simply the fact that Joel is leaving Summer Bay with his ex-wife, Natalie (Antoinette Byron). Yep, we told you the woman was a genius."

Judith takes over as principal of Summer Bay High after Donald Fisher (Norman Coburn) takes a sabbatical. She overhears a conversation between Mitch McColl (Cameron Welsh) and Hayley Smith (Bec Cartwright) discussing the fact that Donald thought Judith had slept her way into the job due to achieving the position at younger age. Judith is annoyed until Donald sets her straight.

Judith's son Edward Dunglass arrives. He is the result of an affair she had had some years previous with an older married lecturer, Edward Dunglass Snr. (Peter Sumner). Edward Snr had died of Huntington's disease, meaning there is a fair chance Edward has inherited it. Judith is tolerant of Edward's eccentric, rebellious streak. Judith and Donald begin to see eye-to-eye after she helps him re-write his novel A Letter to Byron. She also clashes with Gypsy Nash (Kimberley Cooper) who runs for school captain when she blocks her appointment. Gypsy retaliates by spreading rumours that Judith is having an affair with Donald.

Judith is somewhat shocked when Edward announces that he has "married" his girlfriend Peta Janossi (Aleetza Wood) in a private ceremony in her garden and they plan to move in together. Neither Judith nor Joel Nash, Peta's foster father are happy about the idea but as a compromise Judith agrees to let Peta move in with them. After Donald's wife, Marilyn (Emily Symons) leaves him following the death of their son, Judith becomes closer to Donald. Edwards is keen for Judith to pursue a relationship with him but she ultimately ends up with the recently separated Joel. When Edward's diagnosis is confirmed, Judith gives him a video message that his father has recorded. Afterwards, Edward and Peta leave to go travelling after Judith arranges for the pair to go and stay with her cousin in Rome as the first stage of their trip.

Judith's relationship with Joel begins to deteriorate when they move into together and discuss the idea of children. When Joel is injured in the mudslide, his wife, Natalie returns. Joel tells Judith he will move back in with her but on the day he is discharged from hospital Judith drives him to Natalie, who he reconciles with and relocates to Queensland with. She is upset but throws herself into applying for a job in Switzerland. Judith worries she has failed the interview but is accepted. Before leaving, she recommends Donald return to his position and hires Sally Fletcher (Kate Ritchie).

== Edward Dunglass ==
Edward Dunglass
- Home and Away character
- Portrayed by: Stephen James King
- Duration: 1999–2000
- First appearance: 28 October 1999
- Last appearance: 14 July 2000
- Introduced by: John Holmes
In-universe information
- Occupation: Student
- Father: Edward Dunglass Snr
- Mother: Judith Ackroyd

Edward Dunglass, played by Stephen James King, made his first appearance on 28 October 1999 and departed on 14 July 2000. King joined the serial while in High School and juggled his studies with acting. Edward was King's first television role after mainly working in theatres. King spoke to the serial's official website about his experiences on the show and said he was "amazed" by the older actors. "They have taught me so much, it has felt like the new kid at school, when you walk in and don't know anyone and then you find your feet and settle in – it hasn't taken long. Everyone is so welcoming and has been fantastic". He also spoke about other characters' attitudes towards Edward. "Edward is judged by every one else, they think he is some evil character and going to cause trouble. I think it is because he looks so different from everyone else, he is not the stereotypical blonde hair blue eyed surfer who hangs out in Summer Bay – he looks quite different. So everyone has the same kind of opinion of him Edward is a refreshing change to Summer Bay". The website commented that Edward is "not a common sight amongst the stereotypical blonde haired beauties, that reside in Summer Bay". Herald Sun critic Jackie Brygel called Edward "a young chap who may possibly wear more lipstick and eyeliner than an Avon saleslady."

Edward is first seen on the beach. Will Smith (Zac Drayson) makes fun of his unusual goth appearance but Edward responds in an equally sarcastic manner. He later saves Duncan Stewart (Brendan McKensy) from a group of bullies and as such earns an invite to join the rest of the local teens at the caravan park for their go kart trials. Edward stuns everyone by getting the best lap but they are interrupted by their new school principal, Judith Ackroyd (Anna Hruby) who Edward reveals to be his mother.

Donald Fisher (Norman Coburn) recognises Edward's name as he knew his father, Edward Snr (Peter Sumner) at University. Edward Snr died of Huntington's disease and Edward is fully aware that he may well have inherited it from him. Edward quickly befriends Peta Janossi (Aleetza Wood) and Mitch McColl (Cameron Welsh). He helps Peta stage a memorial service for her late grandmother who died overseas by lighting candles near the grave of a woman of a similar age. Colleen Smart (Lyn Collingwood) witnesses this and becomes paranoid that Edward is dabbling in the occult.

Edward's friendship with Duncan makes waves with his parents Alf and Ailsa (Judy Nunn). His opinion that Donald's son Byron's death was better than living with an illness quickly draws ire and is left feeling angry himself with Donald reveals to Alf Edward's own illness. Edward's search for thrills due to his potentially short life begins scaring people. Peta is annoyed when Edward dives off Jump Rock and breaks up with him. They reconcile and begin taking self-defence lessons after being hassled by two boys on the beach. Visible symptoms of Huntingdon's begin to show including muscle spasms and temporary paralysis, and Edward is keen to experience everything. He tries to seduce Peta but is caught in the act by her foster father, Joel Nash (David Woodley). Edward and Peta then "marry" in a private ceremony and consummate the relationship. They decide to move in together, much to Joel's chagrin but Judith agrees to let Peta move in with her and Edward. The couple clash when they try to line Judith up with Donald and Joel respectively.

Shortly after turning 18, Edward takes the test for Huntingdon's which returns positive and he downplays until one day he breaks down in front of Peta and Mitch during a laughing fit. Judith gives him Edward Snr's video message he had recorded prior to his death, in the event of Edward inheriting the disease and although he is initially angry she hadn't given it to him before, he calms down. Edward then removes his gothic make-up and asks Judith for his trust fund in order for him to travel with Peta and she complies, arranging for them to stay with her sister in Rome. Edward becomes tired and irritable in the days leading up to their departure and worries Peta may not stay with him but she assures him she will and they leave after a fond farewell. Will visits them the following year and when returns he confirms Edward's condition is worsening.

== Others ==
| Date(s) | Character | Actor | Circumstances |
|---|---|---|---|
| 11 January–3 March | Dr. Noble | Mariette Rups-Donnelly | Noble is Gypsy Nash's (Kimberley Cooper) psychiatrist who she visits following her kidnap ordeal at the hands of David D'Angelo (Toni Poli). Noble later counsels Joey Rainbow (Alex O'Han) over his schizophrenia. |
| 14–25 January | Mr Gilkey | Ben Ager | Gilkey is a driver who suffers from road rage and begins taking it out on Ailsa Stewart (Judy Nunn) who he has a collision with. He frequently hounds Ailsa and demands payment to the point it takes its toll on her. When Gilkey apologises after contacting her insurer, Ailsa refuses to accept it. |
| 14 January–21 May | Troy | Lucas Sinkovic; Luke Jacobz | Troy is a Year 12 classmate of Tom Nash (Graeme Squires) who plays on the same cricket team with him. |
| 18–19 January | Rhonda | Samantha Braniff | Rhonda is a woman who is used as bait in plan by David D'Angelo (Toni Poli) to get to Joel Nash (David Woodley). David gets her to pretend to have a flat tire in order for him to kidnap Joel. |
| 21 January–10 February | Brian Matthews | Scott Swalwell | Brian is a friend of Sam Marshall (Ryan Clark) and Hayley Smith (Bec Cartwright). He is impressed with Hayley's graffiti artwork and he and Sam frequently get into trouble by tagging various places. Brian is killed when he falls while trying to tag a tall building. |
| 3–12 February | Geraldine Peterson | Anna Lee | Geraldine is a member of a local women's group The Wednesday Club, who invites Rebecca Nash (Belinda Emmett) to join them. When Rebecca invites Geraldine over, she reveals that her marriage has broken down and her sons have turned against her. At a fundraising event for the club, Geraldine takes the credit for raising more than $5000 for charity and feigns ignorance of a mix-up with her and Rebecca's names. Rebecca then admonishes her and quits the club. |
| 5 February | Mo Matthews | Pat Sands | Mo is Brian Matthews (Scott Swalwell) father. He catches Brian and his friend Sam Marshall (Ryan Clark) attempting to tag a tower. |
| 8–18 February | Kaia Stokes | Blazey Best | Kaia meets Joey Rainbow (Alex O'Han) when he disappears into the city during a schizophrenic episode. She stands by him through several episodes but when he begins talking to visions of his late father, Saul Bennett (David Ritchie), it becomes too much for Kaia and she leaves. |
| 19 February–6 October | Bob Playford | Tony Morgan | Bob is a local Estate Agent hired by Diana Fraser (Kerry McGuire). When Pippa Ross (Debra Lawrence) decides to sell the caravan park, Diana hires Bob to look into buying the place and developing it which does not sit well with many of the locals. The development is eventually foiled when Alf Stewart (Ray Meagher), Joel Nash (David Woodley) and Colleen Smart (Lyn Collingwood) band together and raise the money to buy the park. |
| 4–23 March | Brooke Taylor | Bridie Carter | Brooke appears when she and her sister, Mara (Ann Burbrook) meet Joel and Travis Nash (Nic Testoni) when their boats nearly collide. The Taylor sisters show an interest in the Nash Brothers unaware that they are married. Brooke tries to make a move on Travis but he rejects her. Brooke's attraction to Travis is based on his resemblance to her late fiancé David Andrews, who was the illegitimate son of Travis and Joel's father, Jack (John Grant). Brooke then later leaves after telling Travis that Jack also had a daughter, Claire (Kate Beham). |
| 4–5 March | Mara Taylor | Ann Burbrook | Mara is Brooke Taylor's (Bridie Carter) sister. They meet Travis (Nic Testoni) and Joel Nash (David Woodley) when their boats nearly collide, due to Mara's careless driving. Mara pursues an interest in Joel unaware he is married. |
| 10–17 March | Denise Hennessy | Lauren Clair | Denise is a former cellmate of Kylie Burton (Rosyln Oades), who uses an alias "Maggie Crowley" and visits Kylie's ex-fiancé, Jesse McGregor (Ben Unwin). Jesse grows close to her but discovers Denise is an escapee who used a guard's identity. When the police become suspicious, Denise flees Summer Bay. |
| 11 March | Eleanor Mace | Deborah Piper | Three applicants for the position of Byron Fisher's nanny, interviewed by Byron's father, Donald (Norman Coburn). |
| 11 March | Patsy Little | Jillian O'Dowd | Three applicants for the position of Byron Fisher's nanny, interviewed by Byron's father, Donald (Norman Coburn). |
| 11 March | Skye | Karren Lewis | Three applicants for the position of Byron Fisher's nanny, interviewed by Byron's father, Donald (Norman Coburn). |
| 16 March–11 May | Ellen Porter | Anne Grigg | Ellen is a nanny who successfully applies for the position of looking after Donald Fisher's (Norman Coburn) newborn son, Byron. Diana Fraser (Kerry McGuire) does some digging and learns that Ellen was acquitted of the manslaughter of a baby in her care. Nonetheless, Donald gives her the benefit of the doubt. When Donald's wife Marilyn (Emily Symons) returns, Ellen helps her settle in. She then leaves after admitting her feelings to Donald. |
| 17–22 March | Jim Woods | Nick Hogan | Jim is a local police constable. He suspects Denise Hennessy (Lauren Clair) of being a prison escapee but she flees town before he can do anything. Will Smith (Zac Drayson) contacts Jim when his younger brother Nick (Matt Juarez) is dealing drugs for Johnno (Josef Ber). |
| 19–23 March | Johnno | Josef Ber | Johnno is a drug dealer who hounds Nick Smith (Matt Juarez) over a debt after a failed drug deal. He tracks Nick down in Summer Bay. Nick's brother Will advises him not to meet Johnno but he faces him and Johnno beats him up and considers the debt paid and leaves. |
| 24 March | Ted Williams | Kim Knuckey | Ted is the foster father of Nick Smith (Matt Juarez). He and his wife Wendy (Monette Lee) arrive to collect him from the beach house. |
| 24 March 1999 – 26 April 2000 | Wendy Williams | Monette Lee; Lisa Cameron | Wendy is the foster mother of Nick Smith (Matt Juarez). She and her husband Ted (Kim Knuckey) arrive to collect him from the beach house where he is staying with his siblings. Several months later, Wendy brings Nick (now played by Chris Egan) back to live with his father Ken (Anthony Phelan) and Irene Roberts (Lynne McGranger) when his behaviour becomes too much for her and Ted to handle. |
| 26 March–20 April | Miranda Porter | Lauren Hewett | Miranda is the daughter of Ellen Porter (Anne Grigg). She arrives to stay with her mother at Donald Fisher's (Norman Coburn) house and is harassed by Sam Marshall (Ryan Clark) who learns she has left her previous boarding school. Miranda begins seeing Joey Rainbow (Alex O'Han) and when he invites her back to his home for Lunch, Miranda grazes her hand on the cheese grater and runs at the sight of blood. It is later revealed that Miranda is HIV-positive and is afraid of the prejudices she may face in a town like Summer Bay. Joey stands by her and they share a kiss but the relationship comes to nothing when Miranda decides to leave. |
| 29 March–7 April | Claire Andrews | Kate Beahan | Claire is the half-sister of Travis (Nic Testoni) and Joel Nash (David Woodley). When Travis tracks her down she rejects him out of resentment due to their father Jack (John Grant) left him everything. However, Clare arrives in Summer Bay several weeks later after being evicted by her flatmate and is invited to stay by Travis' wife Rebecca (Belinda Emmett). Claire then robs Travis' house and Joel catches her. However, Travis drops the charges when she is brought down to the station and she leaves town. |
| 21 April–14 June | Jack | Eamon Davern | Jack is a friend of Duncan Stewart (Brendan McKensy). He helps him make a homemade bomb which injures Duncan's father Alf (Ray Meagher) when it explodes. |
| 4–5 May | Organist | Gregg Arthur | The Organist at James Fraser (Michael Picciliri) and Chloe Richards' (Kristy Wright) wedding. |
| 7 May–19 August | Wendy Collins | Jayne Leslie | Wendy is the wife of Steve Collins (Don Halbert) and mother of Ruby. She and her husband hire Justine Welles (Bree Desborough) as a childminder. When Justine discovers bruises on Ruby's body and asks questions, Wendy is very hostile about it. When the Collinses bring Ruby to hospital, James Fraser (Michael Picciliri) examines her and suspects she has been shaken. Wendy then implicates Justine, leading to her arrest. Wendy attempts to confess but Steve suggests Justine being only 17 will be tried as a minor and avoid jail time. Justine is tried, found guilty and imprisoned. A week into Justine's sentence, Wendy and Steve both confess their guilt to the police and Justine is released. |
| 11 May–19 August | Steve Collins | Don Halbert | Steve is the husband of Wendy Collins (Jayne Leslie) and father of Ruby. He and his wife hire Justine Welles (Bree Desborough) as a childminder. Ruby's crying is a constant source of irritation for him and his wife. Justine discovers bruises on Ruby's body and the child is later rushed to hospital. When Ruby dies and Wendy feels guilty, Steve leans on Wendy to let Justine take the rap and suggests Justine being only 17 will be tried as a minor and avoid jail time. Justine is tried, found guilty and imprisoned. A week into Justine's sentence, Wendy and Steve both confess their guilt to the police and Justine is released. |
| 11–19 May | Ruby Collins | Kiara Bleskas; Tara McKellar; Brittany Jones; Sian Tierney | Ruby is the daughter of Steve (Don Halbert) and Wendy Collins (Jayne Leslie). Justine Welles is hired to babysit her. One day Ruby suffers a fall in Justine's care and is admitted to hospital. Ruby later dies and Justine is a suspect and subsequently tried and convicted. However, Justine is released when Steve confesses to shaking Ruby. |
| 24–25 May | Guy North | Drayton Morley | Guy is a friend of Marilyn Fisher's (Emily Symons). They met when Marilyn suffered from post-natal depression and walked out on her husband Donald (Norman Coburn) and their son Byron. Donald is shocked when he learns Guy was in love with Marilyn but relieved when she tells him Guy was no more than a friend. Before leaving, Guy tells Donald he is lucky to have Marilyn. |
| 3 June 1999, 8 November 2004 | Father O'Hearn | Alan Russell | O'Hearn is a Catholic priest. He takes Marilyn Fisher's (Emily Symons) lengthy confession and later conducts the funeral service of Owen Dalby. |
| 7 June–2 July | Hope Benedict | Brooke Harmon | Hope is a member of a church group The Stewart family attend. Duncan (Brendan McKensy) takes a liking to Hope and uses the group as an opportunity to get closer to her. When Duncan makes physical advances, Hope is not amused and leaves. |
| 9–23 June | John Russell | John Moore; Marbuck Khan (flashback) | John is an aboriginal teacher at Summer Bay High. He teaches Year 11's Indigenous Studies class. He conducts an experiment on racism which changes the view of one of his students Hayley Smith (Bec Cartwright). John's past is explored in a flashback where he reminisces about being separated from his mother by the authorities and placed into care. Joel Nash (David Woodley), who John mistrusts due to being a police officer helps track down his mother. When John meets with Les O'Connell (Russell Newman), one of the officers present when he was taken from his mother, he is angry. Les apologises and offers to help John find his family. John then leaves the bay in search of his mother. |
| 16 June–20 July | David Janossi | Philip Edwards | David is Peta Janossi's (Aleetza Wood) older brother. It emerges he and Peta live alone and have been living off their late grandmother's state pension, following her death the previous year, which they have not reported to the authorities. David leaves the Bay after securing a job in the city and briefly returns to visit Peta. When a ruse involving Annie Matthews (Carole Skinner) posing as their grandmother is exposed, David refuses to go the authorities and leaves again. |
| 28 June–9 September | Roger Lansdowne | Tony Bonner | Roger is a film producer who tries to persuade Donald Fisher (Norman Coburn) to sell him the film rights to his son Alan's (Simon Bossell) autobiography, On the Crest of a Wave. He begins offering roles to various people in town and is able to lock Donald into a contract by manipulating his wife Marilyn (Emily Symons) by offering her a role. He leaves then returns offering Donald a screenwriter's credit and casts Bianca Zeboat (Lara Cox) but fires her in favor of the director's wife. A writer from the Newcastle Herald described Roger as a "sleazy B-grade action movie producer." |
| 28 June | Reverend Lee | Stewart Reade | Lee presides over the funeral of Lachlan Fraser (Richard Grieve). |
| 28 June–19 July | Annie Matthews | Carole Skinner | Annie is a homeless woman who Peta Janossi (Aleetza Wood) and Will Smith (Zac Drayson) get to pose as Peta's grandmother in order to ward off suspicion from people. Peta invites Annie to live with her but regrets it when Annie takes the role too seriously. Peta and Will track down Annie's estranged daughter Frances Kennedy (Alice Livingstone) and she agrees to go back home with her. |
| 12 July–20 August | Angus Halliday | Gabriel Andrews | Gabriel is a university classmate of Sally Fletcher (Kate Ritchie). His presence attracts jealously from Vinnie Patterson (Ryan Kwanten) who throws him out. |
| 19 July | Frances Kennedy | Alice Livingstone | Frances is the estranged daughter of Annie Matthews (Carole Skinner). Peta Janossi (Aleetza Wood) and Will Smith (Zac Drayson) track her down and bring her to Annie. Frances then invites Annie to go back home with her and she accepts. |
| 28 July–26 August | Sharon Welles | Shayne Francis | Sharon is the estranged mother of Aaron (Ritchie Gudgeon) and Justine Welles (Bree Desborough). She visits Justine when she is facing trial for the murder of Ruby Collins, a baby who died in her care. Like Justine, Sharon is a former heroin addict. She begins harassing people for a fix of methadone. Jeff Berger (Jonathon Speer), a journalist approaches Sharon and gives her a tape recorder to get a confession out of Justine. Sharon is successful but Jeff tells her she will have to wait until the story is published. She testifies that Justine confessed to killing Ruby and Justine is convicted as a result. Following Justine's release after a confession from Ruby's parents, Sharon begs her forgiveness but Justine disowns her. |
| 28 July–9 August | Leon Watson | David Webb | Leon is Justine Welles' (Bree Desborough) lawyer. He represents her when she is put on trial for the murder of Ruby Collins, a baby who died in her care. Leon helps Justine prepare by pretending to be the prosecutor in a practice session but his performance is too distressing. He defends Justine in court but she is found guilty and imprisoned. |
| 30 July–31 August | Jeff Berger | Jonathon Speer | Jeff is a journalist who offers Sharon Welles (Shayne Francis) money to secure a confession from her daughter Justine (Bree Desborough) to killing Ruby Collins. Sharon is successful in getting a flippant comment but Jeff tells her she will not be paid until the story is published. After Justine is released from prison, Jeff offers her $2000 to tell her side of the story but she rejects the money. |
| 6–9 August | Kelly McCane | Laurie Foell | Kelly is the prosecutor at Justine Welles' (Bree Desborough) trial for the murder of Ruby Collins. She cross-examines Justine's boyfriend Tom Nash (Graeme Squires), who admits Justine has been violent in the past and she grills Justine when she takes the stand. |
| 10–18 August | Gemma | Alyssa McClelland | Gemma is Justine Welles' (Bree Desborough) cellmate. |
| 23 August | Mrs. Brown | Jan Merriman | Mrs Brown is the wife of local farmer Jack Brown (Paul Chubb). She lays on afternoon tea for some of the local teens when they answer Jack's advert in the local paper for fruit pickers. |
| 24 August 1999 – 26 February 2000 | Jack Brown | Paul Chubb | Jack is a local farmer who hires the local teens to pick fruit at his orchard, however he loses patience and fires them for laziness. He later lets Will Smith (Zac Drayson) work on an old go-kart that belonged to his late grandson, Ryan. Jack hires Will's father, Ken (Anthony Phelan) to help him on the farm and shares a beer with him after his first day. He later fires Ken after he discovers Ken is an alcoholic. When toxic chemicals are found in the creek, Jack realizes his farming chemicals are the cause of Ryan's death. Distraught, he sells up and reconciles with his son. |
| 31 August–30 September | Anthony Doyle | Kim Knuckey | Anthony dates Irene Roberts (Lynne McGranger. He briefly leaves for Singapore but returns to resume his relationship with Irene, however, when the local teens are caught taking his car on a joyride, Irene's foster son, Will Smith (Zac Drayson) admits to the crime and Anthony ends things with Irene. |
| 10–22 September | Jillian Williams | Alexandra Davies | Jillian is a former flatmate of Shauna Bradley (Kylie Watson). She begins stalking her and frames Adam Cameron (Mat Stevenson) for it, resulting in James Fraser (Michael Picciliri) throwing him out. She arrives in the bay using the pseudonym "Amber". Shauna soon figures out that Jillian is her stalker and she is arrested. |
| 14 September | Darryl | Jeremiah Tickell | Darryl is Shauna Bradley's (Kylie Watson) ex-boyfriend. He accuses Adam Cameron (Mat Stevenson) of stalking Shauna and vandalises his car. |
| 23 September 1999 – 16 June 2003 | Ralph Patterson | Alan Cinis | Ralph is Vinnie Patterson's (Ryan Kwanten) father. He and wife Stella (Tina Bursill) separate after their home is seized due to tax evasion. Ralph is revealed as Vinnie's secret benefactor who promises him $50,000 to return to High School and complete Year 12. He also offers jobs but is quickly recognised as a conman and flees. He returns and tells Vinnie he is dying and encourages him to start up a company but this is a con and he later flees after framing Vinnie for fraud, leaving a note saying "I'm Sorry". Ralph appears in a dream Vinnie's wife, Leah (Ada Nicodemou) has where he confesses to the fraud at the trial and is arrested but in reality Vinnie is sentenced to imprisonment. The year after Vinnie supposedly dies in a prison fire, Ralph returns to beg Leah for forgiveness but she is distraught throws him out when she discovers he has secretly been helping out financially. |
| 27 September–8 October | Gazza Boyd | Sebastian Huber | Gazza is a friend of Duncan Stewart (Brendan McKensy). They find a suitcase full of money while metal detecting. Their hoarding of the money attracts suspicion from their families. It is eventually revealed that the money belongs to David D'Angelo (Toni Poli) who has escaped from prison and wants it back. David takes Duncan hostage but is eventually foiled. |
| 11–13 October | Lauren Healy | Merridy Eastman | Lauren is David D'Angelo's (Toni Poli) accomplice. She assists him in kidnapping Duncan Stewart (Brendan McKensy) but they are foiled by Joel Nash (David Woodley) and the police |
| 14 October 1999 – 24 March 2000 | Claire Rogers | Talia Marmount; Jaime Mears | Claire is a student who harbors a crush on Harry Reynolds (Justin Melvey). She lies about having affair with Harry, landing him in hot water but Sam Marshall (Ryan Clark) persuades Claire to admit the truth. She then thanks Sam by sleeping with him. When Sam brags to his friends about it, Gypsy Nash (Kimberley Cooper) labels Claire a slut and they get into a fight. There is ill feeling all around and Sam apologises to Claire. When Hayley Smith (Bec Cartwright) is sexually harassed by Claire's father, Brian (Gerry Tackovsky) who is her boss, Claire refuses to believe her and when Sam takes Hayley's side, she dumps him. |
| 15 October 1999 – 21 February 2000 | Danielle McCarthy | Claire Paradine | Danielle is the Nursing Unit manager at Northern Districts Hospital. She takes an interest in colleague James Fraser (Michael Picciliri), who has recently separated from his wife Chloe (Kristy Wright), they briefly date but nothing more comes of it. When James receives a birthday balloon from a secret admirer, He assumes it is from Danielle but she denies it. |
| 20 October 1999 – 5 April 2000 | Juliette Bellatti | Nicole Nabout | Juliette is a nurse at Northern Districts Hospital who has a crush on James Fraser (Michael Picciliri). She anonymously gives him a birthday balloon for his 30th birthday. Juliette is disappointed when James tells her he does not want a secret admirer. However, she and James get together and they both leave Summer Bay. |
| 2 November 1999 – 31 January 2000 | Mick Dwyer | John Brumpton | Mick is a former criminal associate of Jesse McGregor (Ben Unwin). He puts pressure on Jesse to get involved in fixing stolen cars. Jesses refuses at first but complies when Mick threatens him. Joel Nash (David Woodley) suspects the deal and investigates. Joel chases after Mick and Jesse, resulting in a huge crash leaving Joel injured and Mick unconscious. Jesse rescues Joel and when Mick regains consciousness, he is handcuffed to the steering wheel of his car and subsequently arrested. |
| 3 November 1999 – 27 March 2000 | Rosemary Myers | Anita Bochnik | Rosemary is a student at Summer Bay High who runs against Gypsy Nash (Kimberley Cooper) for the position of school captain both girls lose out to Will Smith (Zac Drayson). She later protests against Edward Dunglass' (Stephen James King) newsletter alongside Edward's girlfriend Peta Janossi (Aleetza Wood). |
| 4–9 November | Christian | John Atkinson | Christian is a hitman hired by a Scientific research company in the United States to kill Harry Reynolds (Justin Melvey). He takes Shauna Bradley (Kylie Watson) hostage but she and Harry overpower him and he is arrested. |
| 24 November 1999 – 2 February 2000 | Alison | Jenny Apostolou | Alison is Harry Reynolds' (Justin Melvey) ex-fiancé who arrives from America to see him. Harry is torn as he is currently in the middle of a break from his relationship with Shauna Bradley (Kylie Watson). Harry decides to move back to the states with Alison but when they get to the airport, he decides he wants to be with Shauna and returns to Summer Bay and Alison leaves for the U.S. alone. |
