= Stars of Tomorrow =

- Genre: Reality-drama
- Created by: Ben Steel
- Written by: Ben Steel; Lara Kuiperi; Rodney Tromp; Hildward Werleman
- Directed by: Ben Steel; Lara Kuiperi; Rodney Tromp; Hildward Werleman
- Starring: Derick Martina; Laine Tromp; Lindsay Riley; Sharmaine Tromp; Ligia Violenus; Zuleika Coffie; Hilyanne Croes; Natusha Croes; Josey De Cuba; Raphaela Mahadeo; Gyasi 'Teddy' Muller; Megan Rojer; Rudrick Van Der Linden; Jorina Werelman
- Country of origin: Aruba
- Original language: English / Papiamento
- No. of seasons: 1
- No. of episodes: 3

Production
- Producers: Ben Steel; Elvis Lopez
- Camera setup: Single-camera
- Running time: 22–30 minutes

Original release
- Network: ATV (Aruba)
- Release: May 5, 2010 – present

Stars of Tomorrow is an Aruban reality-drama television series that premiered on ATV (Aruba) on May 5, 2010. The series was created and is largely written by Ben Steel and explores the life of a group of young actors in Aruba with acting aspirations.

== Creation ==
The series was created by Australian actor and director Ben Steel shortly after he relocated to Aruba in 2009. Steel partnered with local artist and producer Elvis Lopez from Ateliers '89, an Aruban arts foundation. The series was commissioned by Aruban broadcaster ATV (Aruba) as a way to develop local acting and directing talent in the region.

== Workshop ==
The participants of the television program were first involved in several screen acting and screen directing workshops. These workshops provided essential skills for the participants that would later come into use when they had to make and star in their very own episode. Cameras followed the participants as they developed, and sometimes failed.

== Episodes ==
Episode 1 - Acting Bootcamp - Follows the participants through an intensive acting training program.

Episode 2 - Behind the Scenes - Behind the Scenes as the participants struggle to develop their screen skills and film their TV show.

Episode 3 - Walk in my Shoes - Trevor doesn't understand women very much, until one day he starts waking up in women's bodies!

== Red carpet premiere ==
A red carpet gala premiere of the final episode was held at Cas Di Cultura on May 17, 2010.

== Media partners ==
The two main Media Partners of the television program were ATV (Aruba) and Cool FM (Aruba).
