= The Phone (American TV series) =

2009 American reality television show

- Genre: Reality television
- Created by: Justin Timberlake
- Presented by: Emmett Scanlan
- Country of origin: United States
- Original language: English
- No. of seasons: 1
- No. of episodes: 6

Production
- Executive producer: Justin Timberlake
- Production locations: Seattle, Boston

Original release
- Network: MTV
- Release: April 22, 2009 – 2009

Related
- The Phone (Dutch series)

The Phone is an American reality television show of six episodes, based on the Dutch version of the same name. The show aired on Fridays at 10:00 p.m. Eastern time on MTV.

== Format ==
The Phone is a 2009 reality series that locates its contestants on the street. The two contestants are two people who, some months before filming, had registered to take part in a mysterious game. The chosen players answer one of two ringing phones placed in separate locations. Once a person answers the phone, they are asked by the show's host, "The Operator" (Emmett Scanlan), if they would like the chance to win up to $50,000. If the offer is accepted, the game begins by activating a scenario similar to a movie scene, such as in the premiere episode: the game began with a car exploding and The Operator explaining that a mad bomber was loose, and the contestant's task was to stop the bomber and bring him to justice). The players were then given a series of instructions to follow to complete various tasks, known as "Missions", that have some level of involvement with the situation. Additionally, the players are informed to keep in mind everything that they see and hear over the course of the adventure, for it will have some bearing in the game later on.

Later, a set of two more phones ring and The Operator contacts two other pre-selected contestants. The Operator gives the players instructions to complete another task that will eventually link them up with their prospective partners. If the task is completed, then the team(s) receive(s) $5,000 for a successful mission, and nothing if the task is failed. The money is virtually deposited to a joint account that the team controls until the end of the game. With the teams now linked, The Operator then gives them their next task to complete. For the rest of the game, The Operator communicates with the teams through the phones via a call, text message, or a video message. The next task is then explained, with the teams being informed that the team that completes the task will receive $10,000 into the joint account and the other team will be immediately eliminated from the game. With one team eliminated, the sole remaining team plays the remainder of the game and takes on the next part of the mission challenge. The team is then informed that if this task is completed then $15,000 is wired to the team account.

Next, The Operator will ask one of the team members to step away from the other and give them the instructions for the final part of the mission challenge. The challenge will have a catch: if the person who is separated takes on the challenge themselves, the team will have $10,000 wired for a successful mission. However, if they elect to send their partner then the money will be doubled to $20,000. If the team had successfully completed the earlier tasks, this would increase its final bank balance to the maximum total of $50,000. After 30 seconds, The Operator will ask for the player's decision.

Finally, the team is told their final bank total, but then The Operator informs them that only one member of the team will be able to take the bank home. This is determined by a quiz that will question both players on what they saw and heard during their adventure. They are asked a series of multiple-choice questions and the first person to score three points will win the money and be shown by The Operator the location of the money. The player can get to the cash, but the game is not over until one final decision is made by the winner: The Operator states that the winner has the option to take the entire bank for themselves or split the money with their partner. The Operator gives the player 1 minute to decide and then texts the phone number of the winner to the partner, which the partner then calls to receive their answer.

Jessie Godderz, known for Big Brother, was initially chosen to play the character of The Operator, but was forced to decline due to his contract restrictions with CBS.

== Ratings ==
The first episode of The Phone was watched by 920,000 viewers.

== Episodes ==
#	The Mission	Elimination Round	The Surviving Team and the Eliminated Team's "Death"	Total Money	Winning Contestant	Contestant's decision
1	THE BOMBER (Seattle). In Seattle, two teams will fight to stop a mad bomber on his citywide rampage before sundown.	"Search for The Suspect"; The two teams, Meena and Joel and Delvaughn and Danielle, must unlock a lock box to find the bomber's next target before the water rises too high.	Joel and Meena head for Pike Place Market, as Delvaughn and Danielle "drown" in their section.	$35,000 for failing 1 challenge, but succeeding in the rest, including catching the mad bomber at Gasworks Park.	Joel	Shares money with Meena ($17,500 each)
2	THE CONSPIRACY (Seattle). After witnessing the death of two environmentalists, the two teams Joey and Cassie and Jason and Kristi must expose a chemical company's conspiracy before the CEO kills the remaining environmentalists.	"Find the Location of [The Environmentalists'] Headquarters"; The two teams board seaplanes, where they must decipher the CEO's conversation to track his next move.	Joey and Cassie correctly guess the University of Washington. As for Jason and Kristi, they are eliminated and are doomed when they find their seaplane having mechanical issues and without a pilot. Their plane eventually crashes to Jason's and Kristi's "deaths."	$50,000 for completing all challenges and exposing the company's schemes of contaminating Seattle's water supply.	Cassie	Cassie takes the money for herself, leaving Joey in tears at the 50 yard line of Qwest Field.
3	THE WISE GUYS (Boston) The two teams only have until sundown to stop a mad mob war that has been taking down "squealers" across the city. Their target is the police lieutenant who runs Boston's Organized Crime Task Force.	Find the thumb of one of the gangsters killed by the mob the night before from turning in State evidence. They had to follow a trail of cars given by clues in the newspaper, radio, etc. in the cars.	Chris and Katelyn retrieved the thumb and escape the scrapyard with the Crown Vic. Rob and Stephanie got caught in the middle of the shooting and hid in one of the cars. Unfortunately a forklift took the car they were hiding in and they eventually got "crushed".	A total of $20,000 was collected. Through the elimination mission and the final mission which consisted of relaying an 8 digit code that was reset every 15 seconds. They failed their third mission which was to find the hit list location. Thinking it was Joey's Bar, when it was actually Tri National Shipping.	Katelyn	Katelyn decided to split the money with Chris, thus earning $10,000 each.
4	THE RUSSIANS (Boston) Russian intelligence operatives have stolen plans and materials for The Pentagon's secret Scramjet project and it's up to the players to stop the plans from being smuggled out of the country.	'Retrieve the Scramjet component' The two teams must infiltrate the Russian Embassy and retrieve the Scramjet component from a laser-guarded hallway. The person heading down the hallway is wearing glasses that obscure the lasers, meaning their partners have to guide their motions.	Mitch and Rameika successfully get the component and make their escape; Samantha and Tanya are "mauled" by attack dogs.	A total of $35,000 is collected. Mitch poses naked in front of the artists for $15,000, but Rameika fails to find the clue in time for them to succeed.	Mitch	Mitch decided to share the winnings with Rameika, thus earning $17,500 each.
5	THE TRIAD (Los Angeles) Players have until midnight to save someone from being executed by the Triad, a deadly gang operating out of Los Angeles.	'Retrieve The Scroll' The two teams must retrieve the right scroll (with Chinese writing on it) out of a hundred that have been placed in pots which are full of snakes.	Agathi and Josh retrieve the right scroll successfully, earning $10,000 and advancing to China Town; Jirair and Malayah are "bitten" by a cobra and poisoned.	A total of $25,000 was collected. Jirair and Malayah earned the first $5,000 before being eliminated, and Agathi failed to rescue the hostage from the burning building, failing to earn $20,000.	Agathi	Agathi takes the money for herself, leaving Josh by himself in front of the firetruck.
6	THE DRUG CARTEL (Los Angeles and Hollywood) Players have to stop a drug smuggling operation, that consists of a special drug "Z", before they are killed by the smugglers.	'Find 3 Packages' The two teams must find three packages that's combined weight equals 153g. The bags are in bloody organs that have attracted rats.	Christina and Claudia are successful in finding the 3 packages, earning $10,000 and going to a Hollywood Club; The other team is "burned" with the building.	A Total of $50,000 was collected for completing all challenges and stopping the drug cartel.	Christina	Christina shares the money with Claudia, both receiving $25,000.
