= The Phone (Australian TV series) =

2009 Australian reality television show

- Genre: Reality television
- Created by: Park Lane TV
- Directed by: Richard Gray
- Starring: Justin Melvey
- Country of origin: Australia
- Original language: English
- No. of seasons: 1
- No. of episodes: 8

Production
- Executive producer: Chris Berry
- Producer: dsp Beyond
- Production locations: Sydney, Melbourne, Hobart, Gold Coast

Original release
- Network: FOX8
- Release: 19 January 2009 – 2009

Related
- The Phone (Dutch series)

The Phone is an Australian reality television show, based on the Dutch version of the same name.

== Format ==
The Phone is a reality series that finds contestants right off the street. The two contestants are two people who answer one of two ringing phones placed in separate locations. Once a person answers the phone, they are asked by the 'Cluemaster', played by Justin Melvey, if they would like the chance to win $25,000.

If they accept they are a contestant in the game which starts immediately. The contestant is given instructions to go to a nearby location and complete a task. It is usually at their first task they meet the other contestant who has answered the other phone. From that point, the two strangers become a team.

The team must complete a series of tasks in order to gain four memory cards, which are used later. They learn of their tasks by following instructions the Cluemaster gives them via phone calls or SMS. Once the tasks have been completed the team is told to insert all the cards they have collected into a computer with each card revealing an image on screen showing their final destination. Therefore, the more memory cards the team has, the more pictures they receive and the easier it is to work out their final location.

If the team has difficulty completing a task, or wish to buy another memory card, the Cluemaster can take away money from the briefcase, which can range from $1,000 to $5,000.

Once they have reached the final destination the two contestants are told they are no longer a team and only one of them can win the cash inside a briefcase. The first to answer three multiple choice questions correctly can get the briefcase. Once a contestant has the briefcase of cash the Cluemaster asks them if they would like to share the money with their former teammate. In some episodes the Cluemaster will only allow an even split of the money.

== Broadcast ==
The Phone began airing on subscription channel FOX8 on 19 January 2009. The first episode premiered to 108,000 viewers, the tenth highest rating show for the week on subscription television, and eighth highest rating non-sport program. Its rebroadcast 2 hours later on FOX8+2 was watched by 43,000 viewers.

== Similarities to other programs ==
The Phone has been compared to The Bourne Identity, 24, The Mole and The Amazing Race based on the tasks performed and how teams go about completing them.
