= Stephen James King =

Australian TV and stage actor (born 1983)

- Born: 13 August 1983 (age 43); Australia
- Education: Juilliard School
- Occupation: Actor
- Years active: 1992–present

Stephen James King (born 13 August 1983) is an Australian television and stage actor.

== Life and career ==
A graduate of the Newtown High School of the Performing Arts in Sydney, King leapt into the public eye on serial Home and Away in the regular role as Edward Dunglass in 1999. He then guest starred on the popular Sci-Fi series Farscape in 2004, and then performed on stage with the Sydney Theatre Company and Belvoir Street Theatre as a teenager.

At the age of 20, King was accepted into the prestigious Juilliard School in New York City. Since graduating in 2008, he has appeared on stage at the New York Shakespeare Festival AKA Shakespeare in the Park with Sam Waterston, Lauren Ambrose and Michael Stuhlbarg, New York Theatre Workshop with Tim Robbins and at the Tony Award winning McCarter Theater, Princeton. In 2008, he guest starred on ABC's Life on Mars with Harvey Keitel. He then returned to the theatre, appearing in plays such as Neil LaBute's Reasons To Be Pretty. In 2014, he co-created with Michael Demosthenous, Little Bondi short film, that was selected for Tropfest an international short film festival.

== Filmography ==
=== Film ===
Year	Title	Role
2003	The Rage in Placid Lake	Angus
2004	Courts mais GAY: Tome 7	Roy (segment "Quels adultes savent")
2004	What Grown-Ups Know (Short)	Roy
2013	The Little Death	Nelson
2014	Little Bondi (Short)	Linda / Wayne / Di / Liam
2014	A Funny Kind of Love	Guy with Bottle
2015	THE AUCTION (Short)	Marcus King, the auctioneer (also co-writer and co-director of short)

=== Television ===
Year	Title	Role	Notes
1999-2000	Home and Away	Edward Dunglass	TV series, 27 episodes
2001	Changi	Jack	TV mini-series, 1 episode
2004	Farscape: The Peacekeeper Wars	Pikal	TV mini-series, 2 episodes
2008	Life on Mars	Johnny H.	TV series, 1 episode
2021	Space Nova	Hugo Nova	TV series, 26 episodes
