= Colin Murphy (Days of Our Lives) =

- Days of Our Lives character
- Portrayed by: Robert Cuthill (2001); Justin Melvey (2001–04)
- Duration: 2001–2004
- First appearance: July 27, 2001
- Last appearance: October 22, 2004
- Created by: Tom Langan
- Introduced by: Ken Corday and Tom Langan
In-universe information
- Occupation: Doctor; Hematologist
- Family: Brady family
- Parents: Molly Brady; Francis Murphy
- Grandparents: Pete Brady
- Aunts and uncles: Colleen Brady; Shawn Brady; Eric Brady
- First cousins: Ryan Brady; Roman Brady; Kimberly Brady; Kayla Brady; Bo Brady (legal); Frankie Brady (adoptive); Max Brady (adoptive)

Colin Murphy is a fictional character from the American soap opera Days of Our Lives. He was played by two actors. Robert Cuthill played him from July 2001 through October 2001. The role was then taken over by Justin Melvey who played him from October 2001 until January 2003 and in October 2004.

== Casting ==
On September 14, 2001, John W. Morgan of the Connecticut Post reported that Cuthill had been fired from the serial, and that the role had been recast to Australian actor Justin Melvey. NBC did not give a reason for Cuthill's dismissal at the time.

== Storylines ==
Colin is the cousin of the Bradys and the mysterious doctor that Jennifer Horton met in Africa and fell for. Jennifer followed him to Ireland but he brushed her off. He first came to live in Salem with his fiancé Elizabeth Cox while he worked at the hospital. Bo suspected Colin was trouble when he learned Colin came from Ireland. Although Jennifer heard Colin was in town, they didn't meet until the Mother of the Year party Lexie threw for Hope at the DiMera Mansion. Eventually, Colin and Elizabeth went to Las Vegas to be married. When Elizabeth overheard a phone conversation in which he stated the only reason he was going to marry her was for her money, she called it off and went back to England.

Not long after that, Colin wanted to get back together with Jennifer but she was dating Brandon Walker as well as being pursued by her ex-husband Jack Deveraux. Colin began a relationship with Nicole Walker in order to make Jennifer jealous but was unsuccessful. Later, he reunited with Nicole but was warned by Victor Kiriakis to stay away from her.

At that same time, André DiMera (disguised at Tony DiMera) came back to Salem. Colin was the doctor that secretly treated André's blood disease. When Jack started to suspect there was a connection between Colin and André, Jennifer decided to start dating Colin to find out if he was working for the DiMeras. When Stefano died, Colin was at the reading of the will. Not long after that, he got a silver bullet with Bo Brady's name engraved on it.

In addition to André DiMera, Colin was also Chloe Lane's doctor after she was diagnosed with cancer. He also operated on Nicole after she was shot by an assassin working for Stefano.

Colin broke into the hospital basement where Cassie and Rex were being held. Later on, Colin started to blackmail several inhabitants of Salem: Sami Brady for switching Lexie's DNA test results for her baby, and Nicole Walker with a tape of them having sex after she was engaged to Victor.

After Larry Welch was "killed" by Bo Brady, Colin started getting mysterious phone calls. Larry Welch was alive and was now blackmailing Colin to kill his own cousin, Bo. Later Jennifer was spying on a meeting between André and Colin where they discussed how to enhance the DiMera empire. When André and Colin left the room she tried to get out but Colin caught her. She was forced to sleep with him in order to keep her cover. Later on, she told to Bo and Jack what she discovered. When Jennifer and Jack were getting together again, Colin wanted Sami to lure Jack out so he could kill him. Instead, Sami told André.

At the night of Victor's wedding, Colin was ordered by Larry Welch to kill Bo Brady. When Colin was waiting outside and aiming at Bo, Shawn-Douglas Brady saw him and began fighting Colin. The gun accidentally went off, injuring Colin. Colin escaped, but not far. He ran into Nicole, who told him she would kill him if he did not stop blackmailing her. When he made an attempt to get the gun away from Nicole but it fired and killed him. The body was later found by Belle Black.

Nobody knew who killed Colin. Not long after the event transpired, his ghost started haunting several of the suspects of his murder. Victor found out it was Nicole and that Colin was blackmailing her with the tape.

Later, Nicole and Brady Black went to Melaswen, a.k.a. New Salem, in order to prove Nicole was innocent. They found Colin Murphy was alive but being held captive and tortured by Bart Beiderbecke and André DiMera. They rescued him and found the rest of the prisoners. Colin told them that this was all planned years in advance, even before André entered Salem. He said everyone who was killed was actually being drugged and pronounced dead by a doctor working for the DiMeras at the hospital. He also said that André wanted him to be the doctor on the inside, but when Colin refused, André drugged and "murdered" him like the rest. Colin told Nicole and Brady he would give the names of everyone involved when they got back to Salem but when they were about to escape, André and his men arrived and dragged Colin away.

Colin was the only casualty of the Melaswen storyline. While leaving the island during a storm, he was lost at sea and assumed to have drowned.
