= The Phone (Dutch TV series) =

2007 Dutch television reality show

- Genre: Reality television
- Created by: Park Lane TV
- Presented by: Frederik Brom (2007-2008); Eddy Zoëy (2010)
- Country of origin: Netherlands
- Original language: Dutch

Production
- Producer: Park Lane TV
- Production location: Various
- Running time: 40 minutes

Original release
- Network: AVRO (Nederland 3)
- Release: July 6, 2007

The Phone is a Dutch television reality show, which is created by Willem Brom, Beau van Erven Dorens and Marc Bennink from Park Lane TV, a former television production company.

In each show two cell phones will be hidden at random places by the producers of the show. The phones will start ringing and the people answering the calls are from that moment participants in the game. These two people now have a chance of winning €25,000 by collaborating in the hunt for accomplishment of the given missions. The unique aspect of the show is that it's filmed as being a movie rather than a reality show. It was inspired by movies like Die Hard with a Vengeance.

The first episode of The Phone was aired by Dutch public broadcaster AVRO on July 6, 2007. The show has been sold to 53 different countries.

It won the Best Reality prize at the 2008 Rose d'Or ceremony.

== Format ==
The two contestants have only a limited time of three hours to complete all assigned tasks, after which the prize, in a brief case is removed.

In the earlier format, three USB "thumb drives" are hidden at various points around the city. One commonly used site is one of the city's cathedrals. Each drive holds clues to the whereabouts of the brief case and these are revealed in the penultimate stage of the game where the "thumb drives" are plugged into a specially constructed display unit which is also on contact with the "Operator".

Any "thumb drives" not located within the allotted time incur a penalty of €5,000 and less clues at the penultimate stage of the game. Final clues are given as images of the terrain close to where the brief case is physically located and locals of that city should be able to deduce the location from landmarks or other clues in the images. The fewer "thumb drives" found the fewer image clues given.

Both contestants are given access to the brief case at the conclusion of the game and often the "Operator" is seen in a vehicle nearby.

Failure to find any of the "thumb drives" incurs a penalty of €15,000, but this still leaves €5,000 to each contestant for being "run all over town" for an afternoon.

Sometime during the series run the format was altered in a number of ways. The "thumb drives" were replaced by "S.I.M." cards the contestants had to insert into one of the found phones in order to reveal the next set of clues.

Any tasks not completed in the allotted time resulted in a call from the operator with an offer to sell the contestants the answer or a clue to the current task. They a given one minute to decide if they wish to "purchase" the answer or clue for €5,000 drawn from the prize pool. In this manner it is possible for the contestants to use up the entire prize pool.

At the penultimate stage of the game the two contestants are separated by being locked into separate spaces such as prison cells or shipping containers. Each of these spaces has a specially constructed electronic lock which is only unlocked upon receipt three correct answers to questions with numerical answer the contestant must then enter into the "lock" by means of a numerical keypad. The "lock" is also fitted with a small screen by which the operator interacts with the contestant. In the event of one contestant answering more questions correctly, they are released first to access the brief case, which is placed in some location which can only be accessed by specific means. For example, on the opposite side of a canal and the contestant must use the dinghy provided.

This newer format which potentially allows one contestant earlier access to the prize brings out the psycho-social issue of whether that contestant will be selfish or philanthropic towards the other contestant, a construct which compels one to watch.

== Skills Required ==
Clues, riddles and problems are presented to the contestants throughout the whole three-hour game. Some problems are of a mathematical or cryptographic nature, some are of a geographical or geospatial nature and yet others are of a historical or local-knowledge based nature. Skills such as map reading and orienteering, pulling (rowing) a dinghy or climbing a rope ladder are required at various stages and are a mix of both mental and physical skills.

== Legal Issues ==
The producers must have extensive insurance as quite a few potentially dangerous situations arise during the course of the game. Most contestants seen in the aired show are young and fit, in the 25 to 35-year-old age group and generally middle-class. As the contestants are chosen from the general population the only "filter" is the producers' choice of where the 'phones are initially placed. They are usually placed in coffee shops or cafes frequented by the target age and socio-economic group.

Upon answering the ringing, apparently lost 'phone, the contestant receives the response, "This is AVRO Broadcasting, do you wish to have a chance at winning €25,000, if so press "1" on this device, if not, just hang up."

Viewers never get to see those who hang up but it is obvious that this is part of the screening process which filters out senior citizens, minors or other "unsuitable" people. The two 'phones are not used at the same time, one contestant is secured before the other phone rings.

From an occupational health and safety angle, many workplace rules are broken, or appear to be. Contestants are often seen in workplaces such as warehouses or docks where operating fork lift trucks are working or other industrial sites where heavy machinery is still in use.

== International versions ==
Country	Name	Channel	Premiere	Presenter
Australia	The Phone	FOX8	January 19, 2009	Justin Melvey
Brazil	The Phone – A Missão	Band	April 12, 2011	Sérgio Albert
Israel	הטלפון; HaTelefon	Channel 2 (Reshet)	July 2, 2009	Oded Leopold
Netherlands	The Phone	AVRO	July 6, 2007	Frederik Brom
Netherlands	The Phone	RTL 5	2010	Eddy Zoëy
Romania	Telefonul	Prima TV	October 8, 2009	TBA
Russia	Звонок; Zvonok	CTC	September 7, 2007	Oleg Aksenov
Thailand	The Phone ภารกิจเปลี่ยนชีวิต	ONE HD	November 3, 2018	Willy McIntosh
United Arab Emirates	The Phone Abu Dhabi	Abu Dhabi TV	May 13, 2010	Hamad Almazrooi
United States	The Phone	MTV	April 21, 2009	Emmett J. Scanlan
