= Ben Steel =

Australian actor and director (born 1975)

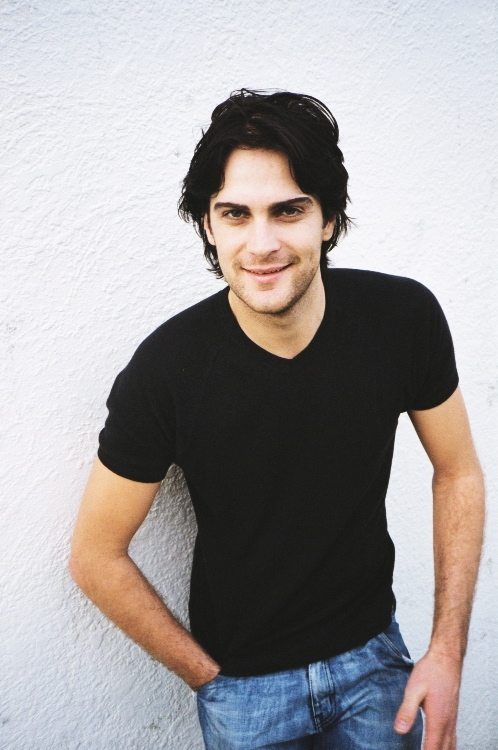
- Born: Ben Steel; 9 October 1975 (age 50); Melbourne, Australia
- Occupations: Actor, Director
- Years active: 1992–present
- Height: 195 cm (6 ft 5 in)
- Spouse: Previously engaged to Deni Hines (2002–04)
- Awards: Nominated for Best New Talent Logie 2003

Ben Steel (born 9 October 1975) is an Australian actor and director who is most known for his regular role of Jude Lawson in Australian soap Home and Away.

== Early life and acting training ==
Steel started taking acting lessons when he was eleven. This later led to studies at Sydney's Australian Theatre for Young People and The Actor's Centre. It was at The Actor's Pulse in Sydney that Steel discovered the Meisner acting technique.

He continued his studies with the Meisner technique overseas at The Impulse Company in London, and Playhouse West in Los Angeles.

He is currently studying at The Prague Playhouse in the Czech Republic.

== Career ==
=== Early career ===
Steel began appearing in television commercials at the age of eleven.

At the age of fifteen he purchased his first video camera to explore life on the other side of the lens.

He made his first appearance on a television drama series in 1992 when, as a seventeen-year-old, he appeared in the award-winning crime series Phoenix on Australia's ABC-TV.

Steel studied media and film studies at high school then moved to Sydney to pursue full-time work in the film industry. Steel's tenacity paid off when he scored a lighting job on the high-rating ABC program Heartbreak High. This was the break Steel needed, giving him enough technical experience to work behind-the-scenes on bigger projects such as the feature films Doing Time for Patsy Cline, Dark City and Oscar and Lucinda.

Taking a side step in the position of Production Runner enabled Steel to absorb new skills while working closely with master filmmakers. During this time he worked on the following productions:

- IMAX: The Story of a City with Bruce Beresford
- First Daughter; Bootmen with Dein Perry
- Babe: Pig in the City with George Miller
- The Matrix with the Wachowskis
- Moulin Rouge! and director Baz Luhrmann.

=== Home and Away ===
Steel returned to appearing in front of the camera and into the spotlight. On 30 October 2000, Steel made his first appearance as Jude Lawson in the high-rating nightly Australian soap Home and Away. He played the popular character for three seasons and appeared in more than 160 episodes.

=== Short films ===
In addition to his acting commitments on Home and Away, Steel continued to develop several feature film projects while refining his directing skills on short films. He has since completed more than twenty short films including Airhead starring Andrew Hill and Mum's the Word starring Christopher Egan, both winners of best comedy at "The Shootout 24hour Filmmaking Festival".

In 2002 he took his filmmaking to new extremes, when he rose to the challenge to make Diagnosis Narcolepsy, a 16mm, 7-minute film, starring Scott Major, Erik Thomson, Salvatore Coco, Lara Cox, Jeremy Kewley and Deni Hines, and the film was completed in just 24 hours.

=== UK / USA ===
After finishing Home and Away, Steel went to the UK to play Prince Valentine in the pantomime "Snow White". Steel subsequently starred in his first independent feature film The Bitten Tongue, where he had fun playing a cross-dressing, money laundering gangster. His next project was another bad guy abducting David Beckham's hairdresser in Unfashionable Tramps followed by a successful season at the Edinburgh Festival Fringe starring in This is Soap and presenting two music festivals for Five.

Steel then went to the US and spent a few months studying acting at Playhouse West under the eye of founders Jeff Goldblum and Robert Carnegie.

=== Return to Australia ===
He returned home in 2004 to star in the cult theatrical production of Debbie Does Dallas: The Musical to a sold-out season.

He's involved in some pretty naughty situations, is having trouble deciding if he prefers the steam room scene or the "one with the threesome" but ask Ben Steel to pose for a photo without a shirt and surprisingly he gets all coy. "I'd rather wear a shirt, if that's ok", Steel said. The former Home and Away star, who is playing six characters in the Debbie Does Dallas musical wouldn't even reveal if he bares all in any of the roles. "I can't say whether I will or whether I won't but it's definitely an interesting ride", Steel said during a break from rehearsals at the Seymour Centre yesterday. "I get to live out some fantasy on stage", he quickly added. The musical, which is based on the famous porn movie, had its first preview show last night but Steel said his parents would wait a few weeks before they watch him in action "I said to mum I was doing this Debbie Does Dallas play and she had no idea about what it was, so I had to explain it was based on a porn movie, but when I told dad, he knew exactly what it was", he said."

He then went behind the camera again in his music video directorial debut by making "Shower the People" for Australian singing legend Marcia Hines and Belinda Emmett.

He then flew to New Zealand to direct the short film Pullin Roots starring Beau Brady and Clayton Watson.

=== Back to Europe ===
2005 saw Steel depart to the UK to revive his character of Prince Valentine in the pantomime Snow White. It also marked the year that Steel made his West End Theatre debut. Steel headed up the cast of The Vegemite Tales, an Australian play that is set in a share-house in London. The play ran for 12 weeks to sellout audiences. Steel continued performing in theatre in Serial Killers, a New Zealand play written by James Griffen performed at the Darby Playhouse.

2006 brought Steel back to Australia where he worked with director Spike Jonze on the movie Where the Wild Things Are.

=== Czech Republic ===
In 2007 Steel moved to Prague in the Czech Republic.

However, in August 2007 Steel briefly flew back to Australia for a supporting role in the indie feature film Four of a Kind (a.k.a. Disclosure) directed by Fiona Cockrane.

Former Home and Away hunk Ben Steel has snuck back into Oz to star in the low-budget psychological thriller Disclosure. After splitting with fiancee Deni Hines and leaving Summer Bay five years ago, Steel has divided his time between Hollywood, New York, London and Prague- chalking up gigs for his acting portfolio. While he remains tight-lipped about his latest project, he said being home may lead to him returning for good.

Returning to the Czech Republic, he was cast in the role of Fletcher in the much anticipated Solomon Kane with James Purefoy. The 2008 film was set in the late 16th Century during Puritan times and was based on the classic novel written by Robert E. Howard. The film was entirely shot in Prague during the middle of winter.

Steel scored his next big screen role in 2009 when he was cast in Red Tails, which was produced by George Lucas and stars Cuba Gooding Jr and Terrence Howard and was released in 2012.

=== Aruba ===
In mid-2009, Steel was commissioned by national Aruban Broadcaster ATV (Aruba) to produce and direct the television program Stars of Tomorrow. The program was a reality drama series that follows the life of aspiring young actors living in Aruba.

== Filmography ==
=== Acting ===
Year	Title	Role	Notes
1992	Crime Time	Butcher	Film
1992	Phoenix	Ben Brennan	TV series
1999	Breakers	Russ	TV series
2000	Water Rats	Rowan Marsden	TV series
2000	The Proposal	Zac	Film
2000–02	Home and Away	Jude Lawson (regular role)	TV series
2003	Five at Summer Bay	Himself	TV special
2003	The Bitten Tongue	Jane Ure	Film
2003	Unfashionable Tramps	Mike	Film
2007	Not for Love or Money	Back Packer	Film
2008	Four of a Kind (a.k.a. Disclosures)	Michael Keeling	Feature film
2009	Solomon Kane	Fletcher	Film
2012	Red Tails	Luntz's Lieutenant	Feature film

=== Directing ===
Year	Title	Type
1995	Frogs	TVC
1996	Letter from Australia	Documentary
1997	Triple J	TVC
1998	Intermission Improbable	Film
1998	Killer Bees	Film
1999	Bootmen – Gag Reel	Film
2000	Family Ties	Film
2000	Airhead	Film
2000	The Wrong Gear	Film
2001	Mum's the Word	Film
2002	Diagnosis Narcolepsy	Film
2004	Pullin Roots	Film
2004	Shower the People – Marcia Hines	Music Video
2005	Prague	Film
2005	Vodka Connecting People	Film
2006	Prey	Film
2006	Man's Best Friend	Film
2006	Samsung – Pitch your Ideas	Internet Viral
2007	The Tulek Show	Film
2007	Your World	Film
2007	Returning to my Childhood	Film
2007	Not for Love or Money	Film
2007	Fetch	Film
2010	Stars of Tomorrow	TV

== Personal life ==
Steel's parents are Glenys Steel and Ray Steel. He has two older sisters, Nicole Simpson (Steel) and Kara Joiner (Steel). Steel moved to Sydney after completing his high school studies in 1993. His family remained in Melbourne.

Steel and Deni Hines become engaged in 2003, after dating since 2001. In 2004, they broke-up.

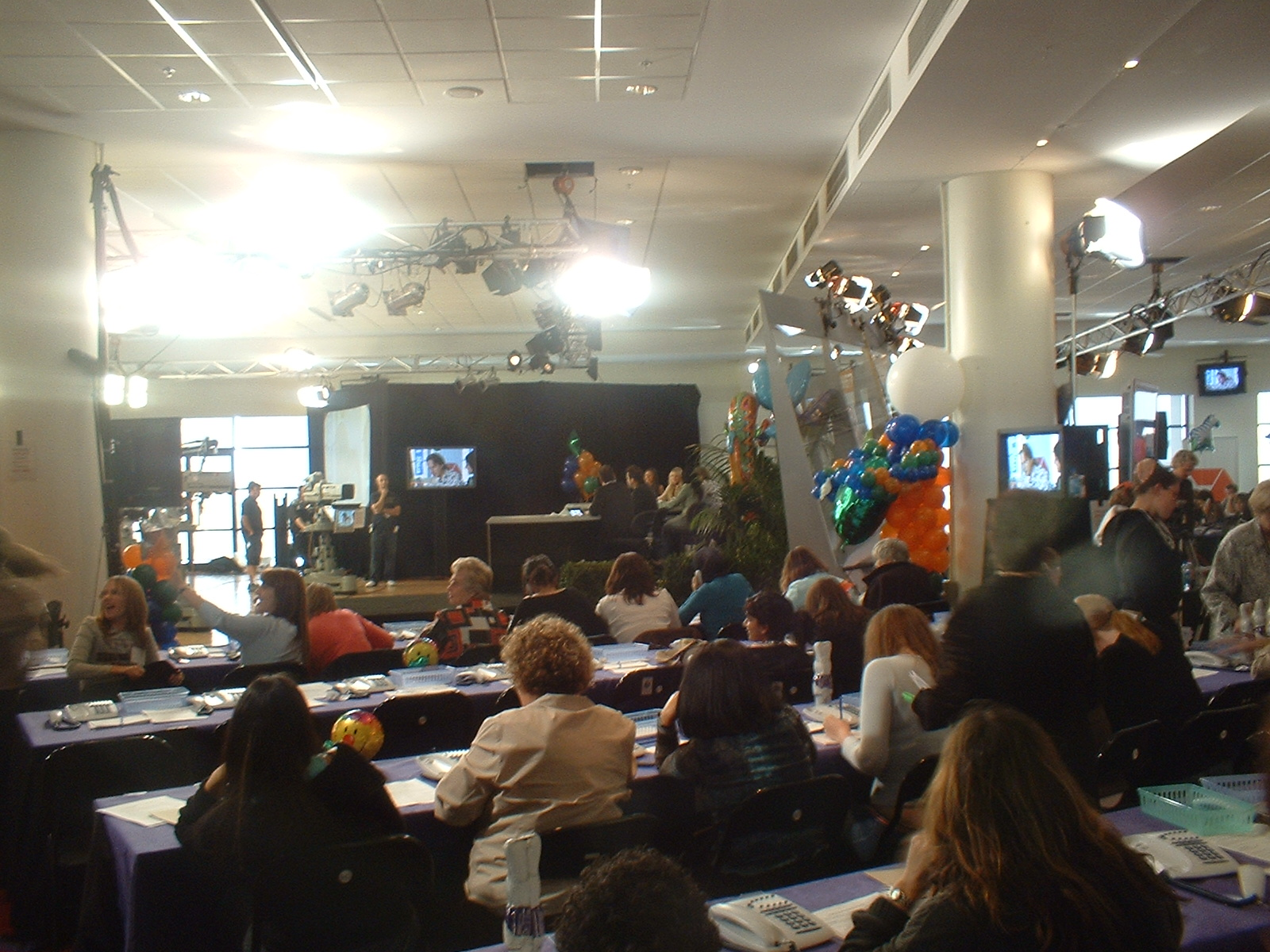
Good Friday Appeal phone room as well as Channel 7 studio setup of the telethon panel featuring personalities such as Andrew O'Keefe

Steel attended Good Friday Appeal 2001–2002.

== Awards nominations ==
Logie Award:

- Best New Talent nomination Home and Away (2001)
