= 15 ATV =

15 ATV (PJA-TV)
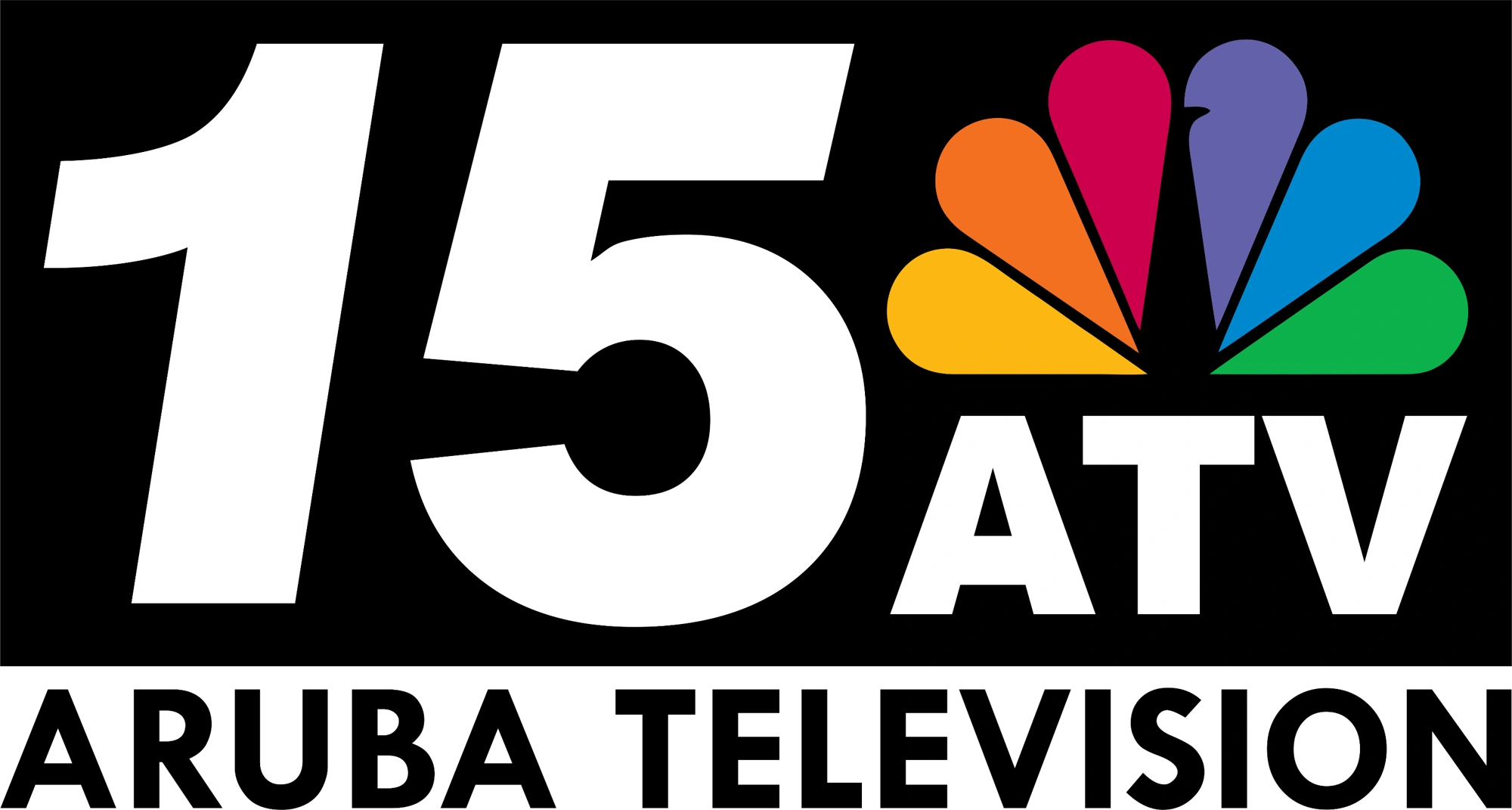
- Oranjestad; Aruba
- Channels: Analog: 8 (VHF); Digital: 15 (cable)

Programming
- Affiliations: NBC

Ownership
- Owner: Aruba Broadcasting Company

History
- Founded: July 1, 1996
- First air date: September 1, 1996
- Last air date: 2016
- Call sign meaning: PJ Aruba Television

Technical information
- Licensing authority: Directie Telecommunicatie Zaken (DTZ)

15 ATV was a television station on the island of Aruba, which broadcast on channel 15 on SETAR's cable TV system and VHF channel 8 on analog terrestrial television in the NTSC television standard. The station had the call sign of PJA-TV (following the standard in the Netherlands and Netherlands Antilles, with PJ call signs), though it went by its branding of "ATV". The station was affiliated with the NBC television network, the only one not located in the United States (following the 2014 closure of VSB-TV in Bermuda). It aired many American television programs for the tourists in the area, with programming from the network's flagship station WNBC in New York City during prime time and overnight hours. 15 ATV also broadcast several local productions, including Noticia Awenochi, Time Out, Mesa Rondo, 15 on 15, Pulso Latino, Trend Alert, Stylish Living and live coverage of events and breaking news.

15 ATV's studios were located at Royal Plaza Mall in downtown Oranjestad.

The station was founded by Mike Eman. During his tenure as Prime Minister of Aruba, ATV was driven to bankruptcy in 2016, resulting in the station's closure. The station was replaced with WNBC on the SETAR cable system.

== See also ==
- Telearuba
- TeleCuraçao
- RTV-7
