= Justin Melvey =

Australian actor (born 1969)

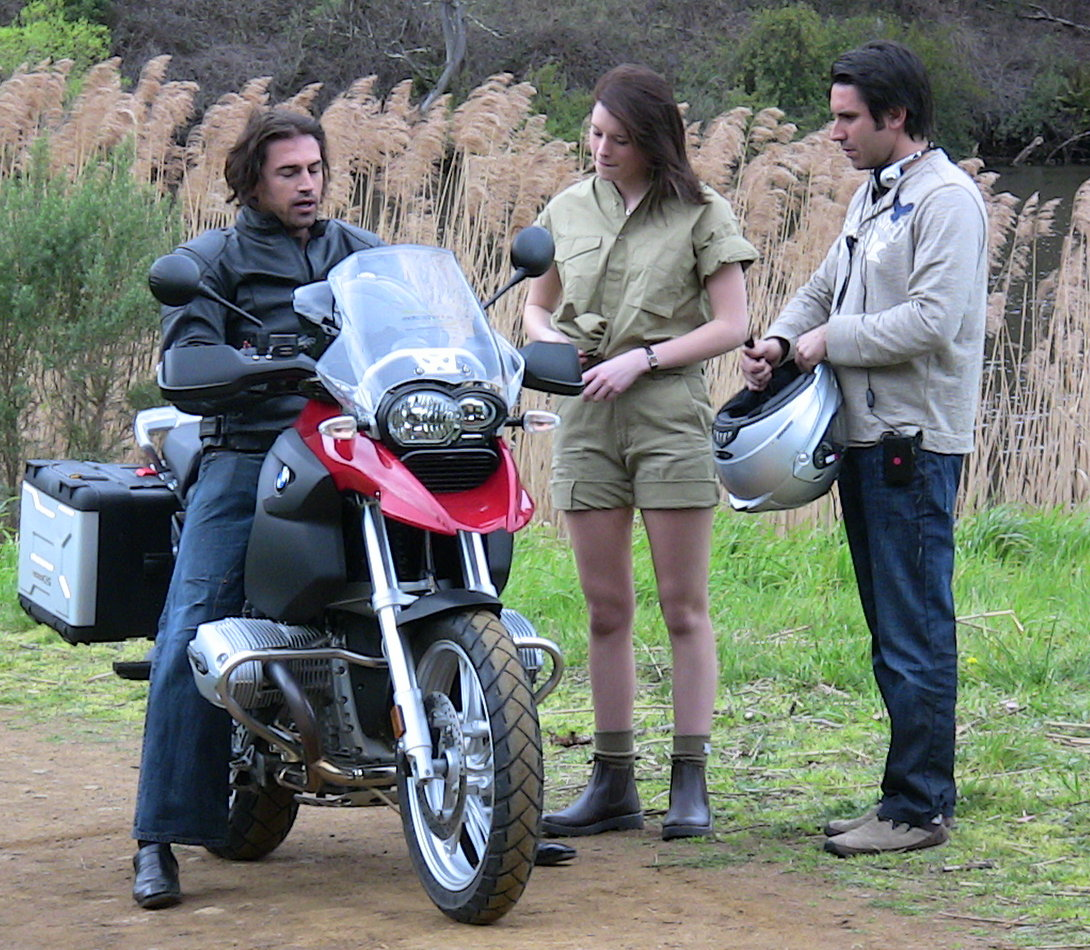
- Born: 7 May 1969 (age 57); Sydney, Australia
- Education: Waverley College, Sydney (1986)
- Occupation: Actor
- Known for: Home and Away (1999–2001) as Harry Reynolds; Days of Our Lives (2001–2003) as Dr. Colin Murphy

Justin Melvey (born 7 May 1969) is an Australian actor who has appeared in a number of television series in Australia and the US.

== Early life ==
Growing up along the Sydney coastline, Melvey attended Waverley College, graduating in 1986.

Melvey was a keen swimmer from the age of five, competing in local beach and surf swimming carnivals and volunteering as a lifeguard for 10 years. He also began skiiing at the age of three, and by 15, he was competing in the State Racing Team and ranked in the top five in Slalom in the Australian National Junior Championships. He was selected for the Australian National Freestyle Team and competed on the Pro World Cup Tour. He achieved second place in the National Championships at the age of 17.

Melvey also began training in martial arts at the age of eight. He earned his black belt seven years later, and his 2nd Degree Black belt while he was still in his teens. He competed on the New South Wales state fighting team for three years and earned coaching credentials with the Australian Institute of Sport.

In addition to his sporting achievements, Melvey was an international fashion model before starting his acting career.

== Career ==
Melvey's breakthrough acting role in Australia was playing Harry Reynolds in the long-running soap opera Home and Away from 1999 to 2001. His portrayal earned him a Logie Award for Most Popular New Talent on Australian television. He had previously appeared in the serial in a guest role in 1997.

He left the series to take on a lead theatre role in The Complete Works of William Shakespeare, beginning at the Sydney Opera House. He played Hamlet, Macbeth, King Lear, Titus and the 33 of Shakespeare’s other leading men. The show toured Australia in 2001.

Melvey is best known to United States television audiences for his work on the soap opera Days of Our Lives from October 2001 to January 2003. He played Dr. Colin Murphy who worked for legendary villain Stefano DiMera. During Colin Murphy’s time in Salem, he juggled many storylines with his cousins Bo and Sami Brady and his on-screen love with popular daytime princess Jennifer Horton. Australian viewers did not get to see this stint, as the Nine Network decided in late 2004 to skip 864 episodes of Days to catch up with the US (instead airing a special, "A New Day", to show highlights of the four years of storyline thus skipped). However, Melvey returned to Days for a short stint in late 2004, which Australian viewers were able to see.

During his time on Days of our Lives, Melvey also starred in Showtime Movie of the Week, the action-drama Faultline, in a leading role alongside Doug Savant (Melrose Place, Desperate Housewives).

In 2004, Melvey returned to Australia to compete on the first season of Network 7’s Dancing with the Stars. Melvey succeeded to the semi-finals scoring top 10 scores in his renditions of the Tango and the Rumba.

Following this, he appeared for a brief stint as Andrew Olsen on another day time soap opera, General Hospital in 2005. His character was the boyfriend of Kelly Monaco’s character, ‘Sami’. Monaco had won the American version of Dancing with the Stars, so a story arc was created, giving Melvey the opportunity to perform the Rumba alongside her.

In 2006, he was also a contestant on Australia's Celebrity Survivor, coming in second place, to World Iron Man Champion, Guy Leech.

From 2008 to 2009, Melvey portrayed the 'Clue Master' on the Australian version of The Phone, based on the original Dutch series.

In 2010, Melvey covered the Winter Olympic Games in Vancouver, Canada for Australian viewers, as a host on Foxtel.

== Personal life ==
Melvey dedicates much of his time to philanthropic endeavours. He has raised funds for the Leukaemia Foundation and the Make-A-Wish Foundation. He also works with the Diabetes Association of Australia – NSW, using his winnings from competing on Dancing with the Stars and Celebrity Survivor to assist the organisation. In 2014, he became the Celebrity Ambassador for DANII Meads-Barlow Foundation.

Since 2000, Melvey has travelled annually to Lake Tahoe USA to raise money for the Special Olympics. He travels to Vail, Colorado to help raise money for the Vail Valley Foundation. He also assists with raising money to help foster care children with 'Big Brother, Big Sister', attending events in Big Sky, Montana.

Melvey is still a current active member of his local Surf Life Saving Club to this day.

== Filmography ==
=== Film ===
Year	Title	Role	Notes
1996	Day of the Warrior	Jordan	
1997	The Gift	The Other Guy	Short film
1999	The Debtors	Driver	
2006	Life on Mars	Dustin / John Ronson / Doctor Cloud	
2006	Prescriptions	Judd	
2011	Soul Mate		Short film
2016	Dogpit	Daf Morgan	Short film
2018	Chasing Comets	Sam Low	

=== Television ===
Year	Title	Role	Notes
1991	Chances	Nathan	1 episode
1997	Home and Away	Dave	Guest
1998	House Gang	Dream Lover	1 episode
1999	Sunset Beach	Masseur	1 episode
1999–2001	Home and Away	Harry Reynolds	Main cast
2001–2003; 2004	Days of Our Lives	Dr. Colin Murphy	Main cast
2004	Faultline	Frank Martell	TV movie
2005	General Hospital	Andrew Olsen	1 episode
2005	Death of a Saleswoman	Geyer O'Brian	
2005	Dancing with the Stars	Contestant	Season 1, finalist
2006	Celebrity Survivor	Contestant	Finished in 3rd place
2009	The Phone	Clue Master	

== Theatre ==
Year	Title	Role	Notes
2001	The Complete Works of William Shakespeare (Abridged)	Hamlet / Macbeth / King Lear / Titus / 33 of Shakespeare’s other leading men	Sydney Opera House, IMB Theatre, Wollongong, Playhouse, Canberra, Performing Arts Centre, Penrith, Twelfth Night Theatre, Brisbane, Townsville Civic Theatre

Preceded by First	Dancing with the Stars (Australia) third place contestant Season 1 (2004 with Kym Johnson)	Succeeded by Holly Brisley & Mark Hodge
