= Kylie Watson =

Australian actress (born 1978)

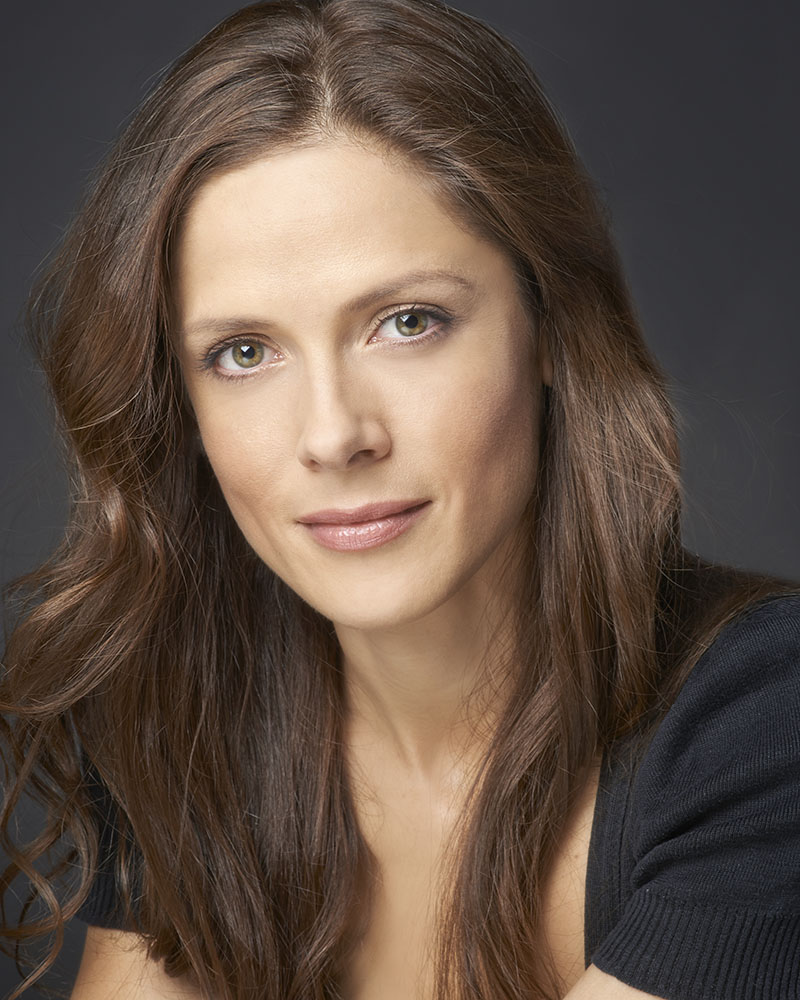
- Watson in 2014
- Born: 7 May 1978 (age 48); Gosford, New South Wales, Australia
- Occupations: Actress; Interior designer Model; Holistic Life Coach
- Years active: 1995–present

Kylie Watson (born 7 May 1978) is an Australian actress, interior designer and model. She is best known for playing Shauna Bradley in the Australian soap opera Home and Away between 1999 and 2002. She is a former successful interior designer and now resides in London where she is a holistic life coach and recovery manager.

== Career ==
In her teens, Watson was an international model, travelling to Asia for several contracts. In 1996, Watson represented Australia in Miss International (beauty pageant) in Japan, where she was 4th runner-up. Watson also represented Australia in Miss Asia Pacific, held in the Philippines in 1996.

In February 1999, Watson received an audition for Home and Away. However, she decided not to attend the audition because she did not think she stood a chance of winning the part. Her agent persuaded her to change her mind and she went on to receive the role of Shauna Bradley. It was her first acting role and she revealed "So at that point, I thought 'What am I going to do? I've never done this before, never acted in my life.' My agent booked me into acting classes – I think I had about eight weeks before I started so I was absolutely petrified. I think I was really bad, to be honest, at the beginning. But like anything if you really put your mind to it and love what you do, you invest the time to grow and educate yourself and I did do that."

Kylie was nominated for Most Popular New Talent at the 2000 TV Week Logie Awards.

After leaving Home and Away in 2002, Watson completed a diploma in interior design. She began her own business called KW Design and later, Belle Abode Interiors.

In 2009, Watson starred in Lightswitch, a short film directed by Emma Keltie and written by Natalie Krikowa and Penny Glasswell. The film played at various LGBT festivals.

== Personal life ==
Watson is lesbian. She came out in an issue of Cherrie magazine in March 2008. Watson told Katrina Fox "I've never made a point of letting people know about my sexuality because I've never thought it was relevant, but it's who I am and I'm not ashamed of it. However in saying that, I think in this particular day it's a lot easier to be identified as a not-so-straight woman particularly with The L Word series out where it's glamorised if you like; it's almost a bit of a fad like we're in fashion."

== Filmography ==
| Year | Title | Role | Notes |
|---|---|---|---|
| 1999–2002 | Home and Away | Shauna Bradley | TV series - Principal role |
| 2007 | Lookout | Mother with pram | Short film |
| 2008 | P.H.O.B.O.S. | Jill | Film |
| 2009 | Turn Right | Police Officer #1 | Short film |
| 2009 | Lightswitch | Shauna | Short film |
| 2009 | A Model Daughter: The Killing of Caroline Byrne | Tania Zaetta | TV movie |
| 2011 | Behind Mansion Walls | Anne Fahey | TV movie |
| 2011 | Blood Brothers | Channel Nine reporter | TV movie |
| 2011 | Calendar Girls | Mary | Film |
| 2012 | The Newtown Girls | Veronica | Webseries - Regular role |
| 2014–2015 | Starting from... Now! | Jacquie | TV Series - Regular role |
