= Ward 13 =

- Origin: Australia
- Genres: New wave
- Years active: 1980–1983
- Labels: EMI Music

Ward 13 were a short lived Australian new wave band formed in 1980. The group released one studio album in 1981.

== Discography ==
=== Albums ===
List of studio albums, with selected details and chart positions
Title	Details	Peak chart positions
Title	Details	AUS
Flash as a Rat	Released: May 1981; Label: EMI (EMX.106); Formats: Cassette, LP	77

=== EPs/ Mini albums ===
List of EPs and mini-albums, with selected details and chart positions
Title	Details	Peak chart positions
Title	Details	AUS
Robot Wizard	Released: 1980; Label: EMI (ES.013); Formats: LP	72
Too Much Talk	Released: 1982; Label: Mercury (6437 160); Formats: Cassette, LP	—

=== Singles ===
List of singles, with selected chart positions
Year	Title	Peak chart positions	Album
Year	Title	AUS	Album
1980	"Robot Wizards"/"Julie"	—	Robot Wizards
1981	"See Venice and Die"	58	Flash as a Rat
1981	"News for You"	—	Flash as a Rat
1981	"Try to Please Me"	—	Flash as a Rat
1981	"Slow Dancer"	—	Non-album single
1982	"Midnight Caravan"	—	Too Much Talk
1982	"Driftaway"	—	Too Much Talk
