= List of awards and nominations received by Home and Away =

Awards and nominations received by Home and Away
Awards and Nominations
Award	Won	Nominated
All About Soap Awards	0	9
Australian Academy of Cinema and Television Arts	3	13
Australian Directors' Guild Awards	7	27
Australian Writers' Guild Awards	14	46
The British Soap Awards	2	2
Digital Spy Reader Awards	0	69
Equity Ensemble Awards	0	1
Inside Soap Awards (AU)	3	3
Inside Soap Awards (UK)	22	205
Logie Awards	51	181
National Television Awards	0	4
Nickelodeon Australian Kids' Choice Awards	3	11
Penguin Awards	1	1
TV Quick Awards	0	1
TV Tonight Awards	1	7
TV Week and Soap Extra #OMGAwards	9	15
- Total number of wins and nominations^{[I]}
Totals	116	595
- References

Home and Away is an Australian soap opera that has aired since 17 January 1988. The series and its cast and crew have been nominated for a variety of different awards, including Logie Awards, AWGIE Awards and The British Soap Awards.

== All About Soap Awards ==
The All About Soap Awards were held yearly by All About Soap magazine.

Year	Category	Nominee	Result	Ref
2002	Pass the Tissues	Sally's wedding day	Nominated	
2003	Wedding Belle	Gypsy and Will	Nominated	
2003	Wicked Weepie	Vinnie telling Leah he didn't want to see her and VJ again	Nominated	
2010	Bride and Doom	Belle and Aden's wedding	Nominated	
2011	Best Comeback	Marilyn Chambers	Nominated	
2012	Best Mystery	Who attacked Bianca?	Nominated	
2012	Best Couple	Brax and Charlie	Nominated	
2013	Best Episode	Rocco dies	Nominated	
2013	Best Stunt	Dex's car crash	Nominated	

== Australian Academy of Cinema and Television Arts Awards ==
The Australian Academy of Cinema and Television Arts Awards (AACTA Awards) recognise excellence in the film and television industries, both locally and internationally. They were originally called the Australian Film Institute Awards (AFI Awards).

Year	Category	Nominee	Result	Ref
1993	Best Episode in a Television Drama Serial	Episode 1222 – Andrew Howie	Won	
1993	Best Episode in a Television Drama Serial	Episode 1251 – Andrew Howie	Nominated	
1993	Best Episode in a Television Drama Serial	Episode 1252 – Andrew Howie	Nominated	
1995	Best Episode in a Television Drama Serial	Episode 1705 – John Holmes and Russell Webb	Won	
1995	Best Episode in a Television Drama Serial	Episode 1683 – John Holmes and Russell Webb	Nominated	
1996	Avid Technology Award for Best Episode in a Television Drama Serial	"Shane Parrish's Death" – Russell Webb	Nominated	
1996	Avid Technology Award for Best Episode in a Television Drama Serial	"The Fire" – Russell Webb	Nominated	
1997	Avid Technology Award for Best Episode in a Television Drama Serial	"The Earthquake" – Russell Webb	Nominated	
1998	Avid Technology Award for Best Episode in a Television Drama Series (Long)	Episode 2413 – Russell Webb	Won	
1998	Avid Technology Award for Best Episode in a Television Drama Series (Long)	Episode 2197 – Russell Webb	Nominated	
1999	Avid Australia Award for Best Episode in a Television Drama Series (Long)	Episode 2646 – Russell Webb	Nominated	
2021	Favourite Australian TV Drama	Home and Away	Nominated	
2022	Audience Choice Award for Best TV Series	Home and Away	Nominated	

== Australian Directors Guild Awards ==
Year	Category	Nominee	Result	Ref
2010	Best Direction in a TV Drama Serial	Lee Rogers for Episode 5002	Nominated	
2012	Best Direction in a TV Drama Serial	Scott Hartford-Davis for Episode 5292	Nominated	
2012	Best Direction in a TV Drama Serial	Geoffrey Nottage for Episode 5215	Won	
2013	Best Direction in a TV Drama Serial	David Gould for Episode 5438	Won	
2013	Best Direction in a TV Drama Serial	Scott Hartford-Davis for Episode 5600	Nominated	
2014	Best Direction in a TV Drama Serial	David Gould for Episode 5873	Nominated	
2014	Best Direction in a TV Drama Serial	Scott Hartford-Davis for Episode 5884	Nominated	
2014	Best Direction in a TV Drama Serial	Geoffrey Nottage for Episode 5712	Nominated	
2014	Best Direction in a TV Drama Serial	Geoffrey Nottage for Episode 5713	Won	
2015	Best Direction in a TV Drama Serial	David Gould for Episode 6017	Nominated	
2015	Best Direction in a TV Drama Serial	Scott Hartford-Davis for Episode 6051	Won	
2015	Best Direction in a TV Drama Serial	Danny Raco for Episode 6109	Nominated	
2016	Best Direction in a TV Drama Serial	David Gould for Episode 6341	Won	
2016	Best Direction in a TV Drama Serial	Geoffrey Nottage for Episode 6176	Nominated	
2017	Best Direction in a TV or SVOD Drama Serial	Arnie Custo for Episode 6486	Nominated	
2017	Best Direction in a TV or SVOD Drama Serial	Geoffrey Nottage for Episode 6417	Nominated	
2017	Best Direction in a TV or SVOD Drama Serial	Danny Raco for Episode 6395	Nominated	
2018	Best Direction in a TV or SVOD Drama Serial	Geoffrey Nottage for Episode 6597	Nominated	
2018	Best Direction in a TV or SVOD Drama Serial	Danny Raco for Episode 6756	Won	
2019	Best Direction in a TV or SVOD Drama Serial episode	Arnie Custo for Episode 6858	Nominated	
2019	Best Direction in a TV or SVOD Drama Serial episode	Geoffrey Nottage for Episode 7039	Nominated	
2020	Best Direction in a TV or SVOD Drama Serial	Arnie Custo for Episode 7117	Nominated	
2020	Best Direction in a TV or SVOD Drama Serial	Danny Raco for Episode 7225	Nominated	
2020	Best Direction in a TV or SVOD Drama Serial	David Gould for Episode 7271	Nominated	
2021	Best Direction in a TV or SVOD Drama Serial Episode	David Gould for Episode 7591	Won	
2022	Best Direction in a TV or SVOD Drama Series Episode	Arnie Custo for Episode 7621	Nominated	
2022	Best Direction in a TV or SVOD Drama Series Episode	Arnie Custo for Episode 7745	Nominated	

== Australian Writers Guild Awards ==
The AWGIE Awards are an annual awards ceremony hosted by the Australian Writers Guild for excellence in television, stage and radio writing.

Year	Category	Nominee	Result	Ref
1996	Television — Serial	Sean Nash for Episode 1878	Won	
1997	Television — Serial	Greg Haddrick for Episode 2065	Won	
1998	Television — Serial	Linda Stainton for Episode 2282	Won	
2000	Television — Serial	Greg Haddrick for Episode 2730	Nominated	
2001	Television — Serial	Kylie Needham for Episode 3027	Nominated	
2002	Television — Serial	Phil Sanders for Episode 3229	Nominated	
2003	Television — Serial	Coral Drouyn for Episode 3445	Won	
2003	Television — Serial	Fiona Bozic for Episode 3355	Nominated	
2003	Television — Serial	Judith Colquhoun for Episode 3473	Nominated	
2004	Television — Serial	Fiona Kelly for Episode 3497	Nominated	
2004	Television — Serial	Kelly Lefever for Episode 3527	Nominated	
2004	Television — Serial	Sean Nash for Episode 3499	Nominated	
2005	Television — Serial	Louise Crane-Bowes for Episode 3806	Won	
2005	Television — Serial	Susan Hore for Episode 3903	Nominated	
2005	Television — Serial	Fiona Kelly for Episode 3808	Nominated	
2006	Television — Serial	Sam Meikle for Episode 4121	Won	
2007	Television — Serial	Fiona Kelly for Episode 4227	Nominated	
2007	Television — Serial	Sam Meikle for Episode 4212	Nominated	
2008	Television — Serial	Margaret Wilson for Episode 4498	Won	
2008	Television — Serial	Sam Meikle for Episode 4521	Nominated	
2009	Television — Serial	Sean Nash for Episode 4649	Nominated	
2010	Television — Serial	Fiona Bozic for Episode 4917	Nominated	
2010	Television — Serial	Phil Lloyd for Episode 5003	Nominated	
2010	Television — Serial	Sam Meikle for Episode 5068	Won	
2011	Television — Serial	Cameron Welsh for Episode 5215	Won	
2012	Television — Serial	Louise Bowes for Episode 5437	Nominated	
2012	Television — Serial	Fiona Bozic for Episode 5391	Won	
2013	Television — Serial	Sam Atwell for Episode 5660	Nominated	
2013	Television — Serial	Louise Bowes for Episode 5616	Nominated	
2013	Television — Serial	Gary Sewell for Episode 5714	Won	
2014	Television — Serial	Nick King for Episode 5946	Nominated	
2015	Television — Serial	Romina Accurso for Episode 6202	Nominated	
2015	Television — Serial	Louise Bowes for Episode 6057	Won	
2016	Television — Serial	Gary Sewell for Episode 6417	Nominated	
2016	Television — Serial	Sarah Walker for Episode 6381	Nominated	
2017	Television — Serial	Faith McKinnon for Episode 6510	Won	
2018	Television — Serial	Fiona Kelly for Episode 6905	Nominated	
2018	Television — Serial	Nick King for Episode 6810	Nominated	
2019	Television — Serial	Margaret Wilson for Episode 7073	Nominated	
2021	Television — Serial	Andrew Gardner for Episode 7433	Nominated	
2022	Television — Serial	Louise Bowes for Episode 7742	Won	
2023	Television — Serial	Louise Bowes for Episode 7959	Nominated	
2023	Television — Serial	Paige Montague for Episode 7949	Nominated	
2024	Television — Serial	Andrew Osborne for Episode 8054	Nominated	
2025	Television — Serial	Alexandra Cullen for Episode 8405	Nominated	
2025	Television — Serial	Fiona Kelly for Episode 8330	Won (Note: Tied with Gary Sewell for Hollyoaks: Episode 6522)	

== The British Soap Awards ==
The British Soap Awards began in 1999. They celebrate excellence in soap operas.

Year	Category	Nominee	Result	Ref
1999	Best Foreign Soap	Home and Away	Won	
2000	Best Foreign Soap	Home and Away	Won	

== Digital Spy Reader Awards ==
The Digital Spy Soap Awards are hosted by the British entertainment and media website Digital Spy. The first awards were presented in 2008, where Home and Away was nominated in 12 of the 14 categories.

Year	Category	Nominee	Result	Ref
2008	Best Soap	Home and Away	Nominated	
2008	Most Popular Actor	Ray Meagher (Alf Stewart)	Nominated	
2008	Most Popular Actress	Kate Ritchie (Sally Fletcher)	Nominated	
2008	Best Single Episode	Disaster at Sea (October 2007)	Nominated	
2008	Storyline of the Year	Kelli's Revenge	Nominated	
2008	Best On-Screen Partnership	Jodi Gordon (Martha MacKenzie) and Paul O'Brien (Jack Holden)	Nominated	
2008	Villain of the Year	Alexa Ashton (Kelli Vale)	Nominated	
2008	Best Newcomer	Rachel Gordon (Jazz Curtis)	Nominated	
2008	Best Child Actor (Under 16)	Ed Wills (Rory Tolhurst)	Nominated	
2008	Sexiest Male	Mark Furze (Ric Dalby)	Nominated	
2008	Sexiest Female	Jodi Gordon	Nominated	
2008	Best Exit	Chris Hemsworth (Kim Hyde)	Nominated	
2015	Best Actor	Bonnie Sveen (Ricky Sharpe)	10th	
2015	Best Cliffhanger	Brax's lake accident	6th	
2015	Best 'It Could Only Happen in a Soap' Moment	Marilyn remembers nothing after 1996	6th	
2015	Best Kiss	Matt and Charlotte	6th	
2015	Best Newcomer	Pia Miller (Kat Chapman)	5th	
2015	Best Soap	Home and Away	6th	
2015	Best Storyline	Brax's last stand	5th	
2016	Best Actor	James Stewart (Justin Morgan)	6th	
2016	Best Actress	Pia Miller	6th	
2016	Best Newcomer	Orpheus Pledger (Mason Morgan)	6th	
2016	Best Ship	Ricky and Brax	6th	
2016	Best Soap	Home and Away	6th	
2016	Best Storyline	Caravan park explosion	7th	
2016	Biggest OMG Moment	Explosion kills Hannah and Oscar	6th	
2016	Biggest Unsung Hero	Shane Withington	6th	
2016	Funniest Character	Chris Harrington	5th	
2017	Best Soap	Home and Away	Nominated	
2017	Best Soap Actor	James Stewart (Justin Morgan)	Nominated	
2017	Best Soap Actor	Shane Withington (John Palmer)	Nominated	
2017	Best Soap Actress	Lynne McGranger (Irene Roberts)	Nominated	
2017	Best Soap Actress	Pia Miller (Kat Chapman)	Nominated	
2017	Best Soap Newcomer	Sophie Dillman (Ziggy Astoni)	Nominated	
2017	Best Soap Relationship	VJ Patterson and Billie Ashford	Nominated	
2017	Best Soap Storyline	Billie Ashford's death tragedy	Nominated	
2017	Best Soap Stunt	Summer Bay bushfire	Nominated	
2017	Best Soap Villain	Mick Jennings	Nominated	
2017	Biggest OMG Soap Moment	John Palmer exposed as an arsonist	Nominated	
2017	Funniest Soap Character	Marilyn Chambers	Nominated	
2018	Best Soap Actor (Female)	Kestie Morassi (Maggie Astoni)	12th	
2018	Best Soap Actor (Male)	Jake Ryan (Robbo)	12th	
2018	Best Soap Couple	Justin Morgan and Willow Harris	12th	
2018	Best Soap (Daytime)	Home and Away	3rd	
2018	Best Soap Newcomer	Tim Franklin (Colby Thorne)	14th	
2018	Best Soap Newcomer	Patrick O'Connor (Dean Thompson)	13th	
2018	Best Soap Storyline	Maggie's cancer	12th	
2018	Best Soap Stunt	Alf Stewart gets trapped in a sinkhole	9th	
2018	Biggest OMG Soap Moment	Robbo's shocking past is revealed	12th	
2018	Most Bizarre Soap Storyline	Martha is still alive	12th	
2019	Best Daytime Soap	Home and Away	2nd	
2024	Best Actor	Ethan Browne (Tane Parata)	Nominated	
2024	Best Actor	Lynne McGranger (Irene Roberts)	Nominated	
2024	Best Actor	Nicholas Cartwright (Cash Newman)	Nominated	
2024	Best Daytime Soap	Home and Away	3rd	
2024	Best Soap Couple	Justin Morgan and Leah Patterson	Nominated	
2024	Best Soap Storyline	Irene's alcohol relapse	Nominated	
2024	OMG Soap Moment	Stevie shot dead by her stalker	Nominated	
2024	Rising Star	Cantona Stewart (Perri Hayes)	Nominated	
2024	Saddest Soap Moment	Felicity Newman's life support machines are turned off	Nominated	
2025	Best Actor	Ethan Browne (Tane Parata)	Nominated	
2025	Best Actor	Lynne McGranger (Irene Roberts)	Nominated	
2025	Best Actor	Emily Weir (Mackenzie Booth)	Nominated	
2025	Best New Casting	Sophea Pennington (Lacey Miller)	Nominated	
2025	Best Soap	Home and Away	Nominated	
2025	Best Soap Couple	Justin Morgan and Leah Patterson	Nominated	
2025	Best Soap Storyline	Irene's diagnosis of Alzheimer's disease	Nominated	
2025	OMG Soap Moment	Theo's dramatic exit	Nominated	
2025	Saddest Soap Moment	Theo's heroic demise	Nominated	

== Equity Ensemble Awards ==
The Equity Ensemble Awards are presented by The Equity Foundation, the performers branch of the Media, Entertainment and Arts Alliance (MEAA). Accolades are handed out to the best cast in a television comedy series, drama series and miniseries or TV film.

Year	Category	Nominee	Result	Ref
2013	Outstanding Performance by an Ensemble in a Drama Series	Cast of series 26	Nominated	

== Inside Soap Awards (AU) ==
The first Inside Soap Awards were voted for by readers of the Australian Inside Soap magazine in 2000.

Year	Category	Nominee	Result	Ref
2000	Best Aussie Soap	Home and Away	Won	
2000	Best Aussie Actress	Kimberley Cooper	Won	
2000	Sexiest Man	Justin Melvey	Won	

== Inside Soap Awards (UK) ==
In 1993, readers of Inside Soap magazine were asked to vote in the first Inside Soap TV Awards. The awards were later brought back as the Inside Soap Awards, and have been running every year since 1996. In 2026, Home and Away was included in all of the main categories for the first time since 2009, following the cancellation of fellow daytime soaps Doctors and Neighbours.

Year	Category	Nominee	Result	Ref
1993	Best Actor in Soap	Les Hill	Won	
1993	Best Actress in Soap	Rebekah Elmaloglou	Won	
1993	Best Actress in Soap	Cathy Godbold (tied with Melissa Bell)	2nd	
1993	Best Actress in Soap	Nicolle Dickson	3rd	
1993	Best Aussie Soap	Home and Away	Won	
1993	Best Couple in Soap	Pippa and Michael Ross	Won	
1993	Best Couple in Soap	Bobby and Greg Marshall	3rd	
1993	Best Female Character	Sophie Simpson	Won	
1993	Best Female Character	Marilyn Chambers	2nd	
1993	Best Female Character	Meg Bowman	3rd	
1993	Best Male Character	Blake Dean	Won	
1993	Best Soap	Home and Away	Won	
1993	Soap's Biggest Bad Guy	Ryan Lee	3rd	
1996	Best Actress	Melissa George	Won	
1996	Best Couple	Shane and Angel	Won	
1996	Best Foreign Soap	Home and Away	Won	
1996	Best Newcomer	Katrina Hobbs	Runner-up	
1996	Favourite Soap	Home and Away	Won	
1996	Most Upsetting Departure	Shane Parrish	Won	
1997	Best Actor	Nic Testoni	Nominated	
1997	Best Actress	Emily Symons	Nominated	
1997	Best Couple	Donald Fisher and Marilyn Chambers	Nominated	
1997	Best Newcomer	Belinda Emmett	Nominated	
1997	Best Newcomer	Ben Unwin	Nominated	
1997	Best Overseas Soap	Home and Away	Won	
1997	Best Supporting Actor	Norman Coburn	Nominated	
1997	Best Supporting Actress	Lynne McGranger	Nominated	
1997	Best Young Actor	Ryan Clark	Nominated	
1997	Biggest Laugh in Soap	Marilyn Chambers	Nominated	
1997	Biggest Laugh in Soap	Irene Roberts	Nominated	
1997	Character We Miss the Most	Angel Parrish	Nominated	
1997	Character We Miss the Most	Michael Ross	Nominated	
1997	Sexiest Female	Isla Fisher	Nominated	
1997	Sexiest Female	Kristy Wright	Nominated	
1997	Sexiest Male	Nic Testoni	Nominated	
1997	Sexiest Male	Ben Unwin	Nominated	
1997	Most Dramatic Storyline	The Summer Bay earthquake/flood	Nominated	
1998	Best Actor	Ben Unwin	Nominated	
1998	Best Actress	Lynne McGranger	Nominated	
1998	Best Couple	Travis and Rebecca Nash	Won	
1998	Best Newcomer	Bree Desborough	Nominated	
1998	Best Overseas Soap	Home and Away	Won	
1998	Best Young Actor	Kate Ritchie	Nominated	
1998	Funniest Character	Marilyn Fisher	Nominated	
1998	Most Dramatic Storyline	Selina's wedding day drama	Nominated	
1998	Most Missed Character	Pippa Ross	Nominated	
1998	Sexiest Man	Richard Grieve	Nominated	
1998	Sexiest Man	Ben Unwin	Nominated	
1998	Sexiest Woman	Kristy Wright	Nominated	
1998	The Love to Hate You Award for Best Guy/Girl	Vinnie Patterson	Nominated	
1999	Best Overseas Soap	Home and Away	Won	
1999	Best Actor	Ben Unwin	Nominated	
1999	Best Actress	Emily Symons	Nominated	
1999	Best Young Actor	Brendan McKensy	Nominated	
1999	Best Couple	Travis and Rebecca Nash	Nominated	
1999	Funniest Character	Vinnie Patterson	Nominated	
1999	Sexiest Male	Ben Unwin	Nominated	
1999	Sexiest Female	Kristy Wright	Nominated	
1999	Best Bad Girl	Diana Fraser	Nominated	
1999	Best Newcomer	Rebecca Cartwright	Nominated	
1999	Most Dramatic Storyline	Gypsy's kidnap and the stalking of the Nash family	Nominated	
2003	Best Actor	Ryan Kwanten	Longlisted	
2003	Best Actress	Ada Nicodemou	Longlisted	
2003	Best Couple	Leah Patterson and Vinnie Patterson	Longlisted	
2003	Best Couple	Sally Fletcher and Flynn Saunders	Longlisted	
2003	Best Family	The Sutherlands	Longlisted	
2003	Best Soap	Home and Away	Longlisted	
2003	Best Storyline	The cruise disaster	Longlisted	
2003	Best Young Actor	Chris Egan	Longlisted	
2003	Sexiest Male	Ben Unwin	Longlisted	
2003	Sexiest Female	Tammin Sursok	Longlisted	
2004	Best Actor	Ray Meagher	Nominated	
2004	Best Actress	Kate Ritchie	Nominated	
2004	Best Bad Boy	Sam Atwell	Nominated	
2004	Best Bitch	Laurie Fowell	Nominated	
2004	Best Couple	Leah Patterson and Jesse McGregor	Nominated	
2004	Best Couple	Sally Fletcher and Flynn Saunders	Nominated	
2004	Best Newcomer	Isabel Lucas	Nominated	
2004	Best Soap	Home and Away	Nominated	
2004	Best Storyline	Angie Russell dies	Nominated	
2004	Best Young Actor	Sebastian Elmaloglou	Nominated	
2004	Sexiest Male	Daniel Collopy	Nominated	
2004	Sexiest Female	Rebecca Cartwright	Nominated	
2006	Best Actor	Joel McIlroy	Nominated	
2006	Best Actor	Ray Meagher	Nominated	
2006	Best Actress	Ada Nicodemou	Nominated	
2006	Best Actress	Kate Ritchie	Nominated	
2006	Best Bad Boy	Daniel Collopy	Nominated	
2006	Best Bitch	Holly Brisley	Nominated	
2006	Best Couple	Jack Holden and Martha MacKenzie	Nominated	
2006	Best Couple	Flynn Saunders and Sally Fletcher	Nominated	
2006	Best Family	The Holdens	Nominated	
2006	Best Family	The Hunters	Nominated	
2006	Best Newcomer	Jodi Gordon	Nominated	
2006	Best Newcomer	Paul O'Brien	Nominated	
2006	Best Soap	Home and Away	Nominated	
2006	Best Storyline	The Summer Bay Stalker	Nominated	
2006	Best Storyline	Flynn's Death	Nominated	
2006	Best Young Actor	Isaac Gorman	Nominated	
2006	Funniest Star	Lyn Collingwood	Nominated	
2006	Funniest Star	Ray Meagher	Nominated	
2009	Best Soap	Home and Away	Nominated	
2009	Best Actor	Todd Lasance	Nominated	
2009	Best Actor	Josh Quong Tart	Nominated	
2009	Best Actress	Ada Nicodemou	Nominated	
2009	Best Actress	Jessica Tovey	Nominated	
2009	Best Bad Boy	Aidan Gillett	Nominated	
2009	Best Bad Boy	Luke Jacobz	Nominated	
2009	Best Bitch	Nicole Franklin	Nominated	
2009	Best Bitch	Sophie Hensser	Nominated	
2009	Best Newcomer	Rebecca Breeds	Nominated	
2009	Best Newcomer	Bernard Curry	Nominated	
2009	Best Young Actor	Felix Dean	Nominated	
2009	Best Family	The Holdens	Nominated	
2009	Funniest Performance	Lyn Collingwood	Nominated	
2009	Funniest Performance	Lynne McGranger	Nominated	
2009	Sexiest Male	Luke Jacobz	Nominated	
2009	Sexiest Male	Lincoln Lewis	Nominated	
2009	Sexiest Female	Esther Anderson	Nominated	
2009	Sexiest Female	Jodi Gordon	Nominated	
2010	Best Daytime Soap	Home and Away	Nominated	
2010	Best Daytime Star	Esther Anderson	Nominated	
2010	Best Daytime Star	Luke Jacobz	Nominated	
2010	Best Daytime Star	Todd Lasance	Nominated	
2010	Best Daytime Star	Ada Nicodemou	Nominated	
2011	Best Daytime Soap	Home and Away	Won	
2011	Best Daytime Star	Esther Anderson	Nominated	
2011	Best Daytime Star	Ada Nicodemou	Nominated	
2011	Best Daytime Star	Josh Quong Tart	Nominated	
2011	Best Daytime Star	Axle Whitehead	Nominated	
2012	Best Daytime Soap	Home and Away	Nominated	
2012	Best Daytime Star	Rebecca Breeds	Nominated	
2012	Best Daytime Star	Dan Ewing	Nominated	
2012	Best Daytime Star	Lisa Gormley	Nominated	
2012	Best Daytime Star	Steve Peacocke	Nominated	
2013	Best Daytime Soap	Home and Away	Won	
2013	Best Daytime Star	Dan Ewing	Nominated	
2013	Best Daytime Star	Lisa Gormley	Nominated	
2013	Best Daytime Star	Steve Peacocke	Won	
2013	Best Daytime Star	Emily Symons	Nominated	
2014	Best Daytime Soap	Home and Away	Nominated	
2014	Best Daytime Star	Dan Ewing	Nominated	
2014	Best Daytime Star	Lisa Gormley	Nominated	
2014	Best Daytime Star	Bonnie Sveen	Nominated	
2014	Best Daytime Star	Lincoln Younes	Won	
2015	Best Daytime Soap	Home and Away	Nominated	
2015	Best Daytime Star	Ada Nicodemou	Nominated	
2015	Best Daytime Star	Kyle Pryor	Nominated	
2015	Best Daytime Star	Bonnie Sveen	Nominated	
2015	Best Daytime Star	Nic Westaway	Nominated	
2016	Best Daytime Soap	Home and Away	Nominated	
2016	Best Daytime Star	George Mason	Nominated	
2016	Best Daytime Star	Lynne McGranger	Nominated	
2016	Best Daytime Star	Alec Snow	Nominated	
2016	Best Daytime Star	Bonnie Sveen	Nominated	
2017	Best Daytime Soap	Home and Away	Nominated	
2017	Best Daytime Star	George Mason	Nominated	
2017	Best Daytime Star	Lynne McGranger	Nominated	
2017	Best Daytime Star	Ada Nicodemou	Nominated	
2017	Best Daytime Star	James Stewart	Nominated	
2018	Best Daytime Soap	Home and Away	Nominated	
2018	Best Daytime Star	Penny McNamee	Nominated	
2018	Best Daytime Star	Ray Meagher	Won	
2018	Best Daytime Star	Georgie Parker	Nominated	
2018	Best Daytime Star	Jake Ryan	Nominated	
2019	Best Daytime Soap	Home and Away	Nominated	
2019	Best Daytime Star	Sophie Dillman	Nominated	
2019	Best Daytime Star	Ray Meagher	Nominated	
2019	Best Daytime Star	Lukas Radovich	Nominated	
2019	Best Daytime Star	Emily Symons	Nominated	
2020	Best Daytime Soap	Home and Away	Nominated	
2020	Best Daytime Star	Sam Frost	Nominated	
2020	Best Daytime Star	Rob Kipa-Williams	Nominated	
2020	Best Daytime Star	Ray Meagher	Nominated	
2020	Best Daytime Star	Ada Nicodemou	Nominated	
2021	Best Daytime Soap	Home and Away	Nominated	
2021	Best Daytime Star	Ada Nicodemou	Nominated	
2021	Best Daytime Star	Patrick O'Connor	Nominated	
2021	Best Daytime Star	James Stewart	Nominated	
2021	Best Daytime Star	Emily Weir	Nominated	
2022	Best Daytime Soap	Home and Away	Nominated	
2022	Best Daytime Star	Ethan Browne	Nominated	
2022	Best Daytime Star	Emily Symons	Nominated	
2022	Best Daytime Star	Emily Weir	Nominated	
2022	Best Daytime Star	Shane Withington	Nominated	
2023	Best Daytime Star	Matt Evans	Nominated	
2023	Best Daytime Star	Ada Nicodemou	Nominated	
2023	Best Daytime Star	Jacqui Purvis	Nominated	
2023	Best Daytime Star	James Stewart	Nominated	
2024	Best Daytime Soap	Home and Away	Nominated	
2024	Best Daytime Star	Ethan Browne	Nominated	
2024	Best Daytime Star	Ada Nicodemou	Nominated	
2024	Best Daytime Star	James Stewart	Nominated	
2024	Best Daytime Star	Emily Weir	Nominated	
2025	Best Daytime Star	Ethan Browne	Nominated	
2025	Best Daytime Star	Nicholas Cartwright	Nominated	
2025	Best Daytime Star	Stephanie Panozzo	Nominated	
2025	Best Daytime Star	Georgie Parker	Nominated	
2026	Best Actress	Ada Nicodemou	Longlisted	
2026	Best Actress	Sophea Pennington	Longlisted	
2026	Best Actress	Emily Weir	Pending	
2026	Best Actor	Ethan Browne	Pending	
2026	Best Actor	Tristan Gorey	Longlisted	
2026	Best Actor	James Stewart	Longlisted	
2026	Best Comic Performance	Emily Symons	Longlisted	
2026	Best Comic Performance	Shane Withington	Pending	
2026	Best Exit	Matt Evans	Longlisted	
2026	Best Exit	Lynne McGranger	Pending	
2026	Best Family	The Fowlers	Longlisted	
2026	Best Family	The Langhams	Pending	
2026	Best Newcomer	Maddison Brown	Longlisted	
2026	Best Newcomer	Jeremy Lindsay Taylor	Pending	
2026	Best Partnership	Nicholas Cartwright and Stephanie Panozzo	Longlisted	
2026	Best Partnership	Ada Nicodemou and James Stewart	Pending	
2026	Best Showstopper	The Train Crash	Pending	
2026	Best Showstopper	Tane flees to Western Australia	Longlisted	
2026	Best Soap	Home and Away	Pending	
2026	Best Storyline	Mackenzie and Levi's fertility journey	Longlisted	
2026	Best Storyline	Irene's Alzheimer's diagnosis	Pending	
2026	Best Villain	Lachlan Miller	Longlisted	
2026	Best Villain	Sara Wiseman	Pending	
2026	Best Young Performer	Austin Cutcliffe	Longlisted	
2026	Best Young Performer	Nathan Murray	Pending	

== Logie Awards ==
Home and Away is the most successful recipient of Logie Awards, having won forty-nine Logies to date.

Year	Category	Nominee	Result	Ref
1989	Most Popular New Talent	Nicolle Dickson	Won	
1990	Most Popular Program (NSW)	Home and Away	Won	
1991	Most Popular Drama Series	Home and Away	Won	
1991	Most Popular Actor	Craig McLachlan	Won	
1991	Most Popular Actress	Nicolle Dickson	Nominated	
1991	Most Popular Program (NSW)	Home and Away	Won	
1991	Most Popular New Talent	Rebekah Elmaloglou	Nominated	
1992	Most Popular Series	Home and Away	Nominated	
1992	Most Popular Actress	Rebekah Elmaloglou	Nominated	
1992	Most Popular Program (NSW)	Home and Away	Won	
1993	Most Popular Series	Home and Away	Won	
1993	Most Popular Actress	Rebekah Elmaloglou	Nominated	
1993	Most Popular New Talent	Dieter Brummer	Nominated	
1994	Most Popular Series	Home and Away	Won	
1994	Most Popular New Talent	Melissa George	Won	
1995	Most Popular Series	Home and Away	Won	
1995	Gold Logie for Most Popular Personality on Australian TV	Melissa George	Nominated	
1995	Most Popular Actor	Dieter Brummer	Won	
1995	Most Popular Actress	Melissa George	Won	
1995	Most Popular New Talent	Daniel Amalm	Nominated	
1995	Most Popular New Talent	Isla Fisher	Nominated	
1996	Most Popular Series	Home and Away	Won	
1996	Most Popular Actor	Dieter Brummer	Won	
1996	Most Popular New Talent	Nic Testoni	Won	
1996	Gold Logie for Most Popular Personality on Australian TV	Dieter Brummer	Nominated	
1996	Gold Logie for Most Popular Personality on Australian TV	Melissa George	Nominated	
1997	Most Popular Series	Home and Away	Nominated	
1997	Most Popular Actor	Nic Testoni	Nominated	
1997	Most Popular Actress	Melissa George	Nominated	
1997	Most Popular Actress	Isla Fisher	Nominated	
1997	Most Popular Actress	Tempany Deckert	Nominated	
1997	Most Popular New Talent	Ben Unwin	Nominated	
1997	Most Popular New Talent	Belinda Emmett	Nominated	
1998	Most Popular Series	Home and Away	Nominated	
1998	Most Popular Actor	Nic Testoni	Nominated	
1998	Most Popular Actress	Belinda Emmett	Nominated	
1998	Most Popular Actress	Kristy Wright	Nominated	
1998	Most Popular New Talent	Bree Desborough	Nominated	
1999	Most Popular New Female Talent	Kimberley Cooper	Won	
1999	Most Popular Program	Home and Away	Nominated	
1999	Gold Logie for Most Popular Personality on Australian TV	Belinda Emmett	Nominated	
1999	Most Popular Actress	Belinda Emmett	Nominated	
1999	Most Popular New Male Talent	Graeme Squires	Nominated	
1999	Most Popular New Female Talent	Bec Cartwright	Nominated	
2000	Most Popular Program	Home and Away	Nominated	
2000	Most Popular New Male Talent	Justin Melvey	Won	
2000	Most Popular New Male Talent	Cameron Welsh	Nominated	
2000	Most Popular New Female Talent	Kylie Watson	Nominated	
2000	Most Popular New Female Talent	Aleetza Wood	Nominated	
2001	Gold Logie for Most Popular Personality on Australian TV	Ada Nicodemou	Nominated	
2001	Most Popular Program	Home and Away	Nominated	
2001	Most Popular Actress	Bec Cartwright	Nominated	
2001	Most Popular New Male Talent	Beau Brady	Nominated	
2001	Most Popular New Male Talent	Chris Egan	Nominated	
2001	Most Popular New Male Talent	Ben Steel	Nominated	
2001	Most Popular New Female Talent	Tammin Sursok	Won	
2002	Most Popular Program	Home and Away	Nominated	
2002	Gold Logie for Most Popular Personality on Australian TV	Ada Nicodemou	Nominated	
2002	Most Popular Actor	Ryan Kwanten	Nominated	
2002	Most Popular Actress	Ada Nicodemou	Nominated	
2002	Most Popular New Male Talent	Martin Dingle-Wall	Nominated	
2002	Most Popular New Male Talent	Danny Raco	Nominated	
2002	Most Popular New Female Talent	Stephanie Chaves-Jacobsen	Nominated	
2003	Most Popular Actor	Beau Brady	Nominated	
2003	Most Popular New Male Talent	Daniel Collopy	Nominated	
2004	Most Popular New Male Talent	Kip Gamblin	Won	
2004	Most Popular New Female Talent	Isabel Lucas	Won	
2004	Most Popular Australian Program	Home and Away	Nominated	
2004	Most Popular Australian Drama Series	Home and Away	Nominated	
2004	Most Popular Actor	Beau Brady	Nominated	
2004	Most Popular Actress	Bec Cartwright	Nominated	
2004	Most Popular Actress	Tammin Sursok	Nominated	
2004	Most Popular New Female Talent	Amy Mizzi	Nominated	
2005	Most Popular Actress	Bec Cartwright	Won	
2005	Most Popular New Male Talent	Chris Hemsworth	Won	
2005	Most Popular Australian Drama Series	Home and Away	Won	
2005	Gold Logie for Most Popular Personality on Australian TV	Bec Cartwright	Nominated	
2005	Most Popular Actor	Beau Brady	Nominated	
2005	Most Popular Actor	Chris Hemsworth	Nominated	
2005	Most Popular New Male Talent	Jason Smith	Nominated	
2005	Most Popular New Female Talent	Indiana Evans	Nominated	
2006	Most Popular Australian Drama Series	Home and Away	Won	
2006	Most Popular Actress	Kate Ritchie	Won	
2006	Most Popular New Male Talent	Paul O'Brien	Won	
2006	Most Popular New Female Talent	Jodi Gordon	Won	
2006	Gold Logie for Most Popular Personality on Australian TV	Bec Hewitt	Nominated	
2006	Gold Logie for Most Popular Personality on Australian TV	Ada Nicodemou	Nominated	
2006	Gold Logie for Most Popular Personality on Australian TV	Kate Ritchie	Nominated	
2006	Most Popular Actor	Chris Hemsworth	Nominated	
2006	Most Popular Actor	Joel McIlroy	Nominated	
2006	Most Popular Actress	Bec Hewitt	Nominated	
2006	Most Popular Actress	Ada Nicodemou	Nominated	
2006	Most Popular New Male Talent	Rhys Wakefield	Nominated	
2006	Most Popular New Female Talent	Sharni Vinson	Nominated	
2007	Most Popular Australian Drama Series	Home and Away	Won	
2007	Gold Logie for Most Popular Personality on Australian TV	Kate Ritchie	Won	
2007	Most Popular Actress	Kate Ritchie	Won	
2007	Most Popular New Female Talent	Amy Mathews	Won	
2007	Most Popular Actor	Mark Furze	Nominated	
2007	Most Popular Actor	Paul O'Brien	Nominated	
2007	Most Popular New Male Talent	Bobby Morley	Nominated	
2007	Most Popular New Male Talent	Chris Sadrinna	Nominated	
2007	Most Popular New Female Talent	Jessica Tovey	Nominated	
2008	Most Popular Australian Drama Series	Home and Away	Won	
2008	Gold Logie for Most Popular Personality on Australian TV	Kate Ritchie	Won	
2008	Most Popular Actress	Kate Ritchie	Won	
2008	Most Popular New Male Talent	Lincoln Lewis	Won	
2008	Most Popular Actor	Mark Furze	Nominated	
2008	Most Popular Actor	Paul O'Brien	Nominated	
2008	Most Popular New Female Talent	Charlotte Best	Nominated	
2009	Most Popular Actor	Todd Lasance	Won	
2009	Most Popular Australian Drama Series	Home and Away	Nominated	
2009	Gold Logie for Most Popular Personality on Australian TV	Kate Ritchie	Nominated	
2009	Most Popular Actress	Kate Ritchie	Nominated	
2009	Most Popular Actress	Jodi Gordon	Nominated	
2009	Most Popular New Male Talent	Jordan Rodrigues	Nominated	
2009	Most Popular New Female Talent	Rebecca Breeds	Nominated	
2010	Gold Logie	Esther Anderson	Nominated	
2010	Gold Logie for Most Popular Personality on Australian TV	Ray Meagher	Won	
2010	Most Popular Actor	Luke Jacobz	Nominated	
2010	Most Popular Actor	Todd Lasance	Nominated	
2010	Most Popular Actor	Ray Meagher	Nominated	
2010	Most Popular Actress	Esther Anderson	Nominated	
2010	Most Popular Actress	Rebecca Breeds	Nominated	
2010	Most Popular Actress	Jessica Tovey	Nominated	
2010	Most Popular Drama Series	Home and Away	Nominated	
2010	Most Popular New Male Talent	Luke Mitchell	Won	
2010	Most Popular New Female Talent	Kate Bell	Nominated	
2011	Most Popular Drama Series	Home and Away	Nominated	
2011	Most Popular New Male Talent	Charles Cottier	Nominated	
2012	Most Popular Drama	Home and Away	Nominated	
2012	Gold Logie for Most Popular Personality on Australian TV	Esther Anderson	Nominated	
2012	Most Popular Actor	Ray Meagher	Nominated	
2012	Most Popular Actress	Esther Anderson	Nominated	
2012	Most Popular New Male Talent	Dan Ewing	Nominated	
2012	Most Popular New Male Talent	Steve Peacocke	Won	
2012	Most Popular New Female Talent	Demi Harman	Nominated	
2013	Most Popular Australian Drama	Home and Away	Nominated	
2013	Gold Logie for Most Popular Personality on Australian TV	Steve Peacocke	Nominated	
2013	Most Popular Actor	Steve Peacocke	Won	
2013	Most Popular New Female Talent	Catherine Mack	Nominated	
2013	Most Popular New Male Talent	Will McDonald	Nominated	
2014	Most Popular Drama Program	Home and Away	Won	
2014	Gold Logie for Most Popular Personality on Australian TV	Steve Peacocke	Nominated	
2014	Most Popular Actor	Dan Ewing	Nominated	
2014	Most Popular Actor	Steve Peacocke	Nominated	
2014	Most Popular New Talent	Bonnie Sveen	Won	
2014	Most Popular New Talent	Johnny Ruffo	Nominated	
2015	Logie Hall of Fame	Home and Away	Won	
2015	Most Popular Drama Program	Home and Away	Won	
2015	Gold Logie for Most Popular Personality on Australian TV	Steve Peacocke	Nominated	
2015	Most Popular Actor	Steve Peacocke	Won	
2015	Most Popular Actress	Bonnie Sveen	Nominated	
2016	Best Actor	Steve Peacocke	Nominated	
2016	Best Actress	Bonnie Sveen	Nominated	
2016	Best Drama Program	Home and Away	Won	
2016	Best New Talent	Pia Miller	Nominated	
2017	Best Drama Program	Home and Away	Nominated	
2017	Best New Talent	Penny McNamee	Nominated	
2018	Most Popular Actor	Ray Meagher	Won	
2018	Most Popular Drama Program	Home and Away	Nominated	
2018	Most Popular New Talent	Sophie Dillman	Nominated	
2018	Most Popular New Talent	Sam Frost	Nominated	
2019	Most Popular Actor	Ray Meagher	Nominated	
2019	Most Popular Drama Program	Home and Away	Nominated	
2019	Most Popular New Talent	Courtney Miller	Nominated	
2022	Gold Logie for Most Popular Personality on Australian Television	Ray Meagher	Nominated	
2022	Most Popular Actor	Ray Meagher	Nominated	
2022	Most Popular Actress	Ada Nicodemou	Nominated	
2022	Most Popular Actress	Sophie Dillman	Nominated	
2022	Most Popular Drama Program	Home and Away	Won	
2022	Most Popular New Talent	Matt Evans	Nominated	
2023	Most Popular Actor	Ray Meagher	Nominated	
2023	Most Popular Actor	James Stewart	Nominated	
2023	Most Popular Actress	Lynne McGranger	Nominated	
2023	Most Popular Actress	Ada Nicodemou	Nominated	
2023	Most Popular Actress	Emily Symons	Nominated	
2023	Most Popular Drama Series, Miniseries or Telemovie	Home and Away	Won	
2024	Most Popular New Talent	Tristan Gorey	Nominated	
2025	Gold Logie for Most Popular Personality on Australian Television	Lynne McGranger	Won	
2025	Best Lead Actress in a Drama	Lynne McGranger	Won	
2025	Most Popular New Talent	Hailey Pinto	Nominated	

== National Television Awards ==
The National Television Awards are a British television awards ceremony. The NTAs results are voted for by the general public and the award categories are given the title of Most Popular.

Year	Category	Nominee	Result	Ref
1996	Most Popular Newcomer	Nic Testoni	Nominated	
1996	Most Popular Soap	Home and Away	Nominated	
1997	Most Popular Newcomer	Ben Unwin	Nominated	
1997	Most Popular Soap	Home and Away	Nominated	

== Nickelodeon Australian Kids' Choice Award ==
The Nickelodeon Australian Kids' Choice Awards (Note: Although it is not a kid's show, many television series and films which are aimed at a more mature or teen audience have been nominated for this award.) is an annual awards show usually held during October or November. It is televised and the winners are chosen and voted for by children.

Year	Category	Nominee	Result	Ref
2005	Fave Pash	Tash and Robbie	Won	
2005	Fave TV Star	Jason Smith	Won	
2006	Fave Hottie (female)	Isabel Lucas	Nominated	
2006	Fave Hottie (male)	Chris Hemsworth	Nominated	
2006	Fave TV Show	Home and Away	Nominated	
2006	Fave TV Star	Kate Ritchie	Won	
2006	Fave TV Star	Chris Hemsworth	Nominated	
2011	Fave TV Show	Home and Away	Nominated	
2011	Hottest Girl Hottie	Samara Weaving	Nominated	
2011	Hottest Guy Hotties	David Jones-Roberts	Nominated	
2011	Super Fresh Award	Samara Weaving	Nominated	

== Penguin Awards ==
The Penguin Awards were introduced in the late 1950s by the Australian Television Society to help promote "excellence within the industry".

Year	Category	Nominee	Result	Ref
1990	Best Drama Serial	Home and Away	Won	

== TV Quick Awards ==
The TV Quick Awards were presented by the British magazine TV Quick.

Year	Category	Nominee	Result	Ref
2001	Best Soap	Home and Away	Nominated	

== TV Tonight Awards ==
Year	Category	Nominee	Result	Ref
2007	Best Drama (Australian)	Home and Away	Nominated	
2007	Best Female	Kate Ritchie	Won	
2008	Favourite Female	Kate Ritchie	Nominated	
2009	Worst Show (Australian)	Home and Away	Nominated	
2009	Worst Female	Jodi Gordon	Nominated	
2020	Best Australian Drama	Home and Away (season 32)	Nominated	
2022	Best Australian Drama	Home and Away (season 34)	Nominated	

== TV Week and Soap Extra #OMGAwards ==
Year	Category	Nominee	Result	Ref
2015	Favourite Show	Home and Away	Won	
2015	Favourite Couple	Brax and Ricky	Won	
2015	Favourite Couple	Leah and Zac	Nominated	
2015	Favourite Couple	Nate and Kat	Nominated	
2015	Favourite Couple	Marilyn and John	Nominated	
2015	Best Storyline	Brax's fake death/escape	Won	
2015	Best Wedding	Marilyn and John's	Won	
2015	Best Love Triangle	Ash, Phoebe and Kyle	Won	
2015	Best Shock Kiss	Ash and Phoebe	Won	
2015	Best Shock Kiss	Matt and Charlotte	Nominated	
2015	Best Showdown	Hannah and Evelyn	Nominated	
2015	Best Villain	Sophie	Won	
2015	Best BFFs	Leah and Irene	Won	
2015	Best Abs	Brax	Won	
2015	Best Abs	Nate	Nominated	

== Notes ==
^{^[I]} Certain award groups do not simply award one winner. They recognize several different recipients and have runners-up. Since this is a specific recognition and is different from losing an award, runner-up mentions are considered wins in this award tally.
