= Ethan Browne =

New Zealand actor (born 1991)

- Born: New Zealand
- Occupation: Actor
- Years active: 2017–present
- Children: 1

Ethan Browne is a New Zealand actor, known for playing Tane Parata on the Australian soap opera Home and Away since 2020.

== Early life and career ==
He grew up in Wairoa in the Hawke's Bay region of the North Island. At the age of 16, he became a father to a daughter. After high school, he took a gap year and then studied civil engineering. In 2015, Browne left New Zealand and relocated to Brisbane in Australia to live closer to his daughter. He pursued a career as a civil engineer.

He then decided to pursue his passion for acting, beginning with weekly acting classes in Brisbane. He was then accepted to study a BA in acting at the National Institute of Dramatic Art (NIDA) in Sydney, where he studied alongside his future Home and Away co-star, Nicholas Cartwright. He worked as a bouncer at night to support his studies.

After graduating from NIDA, Browne landed the role of Tane Parata, brother of Ari Parata in Home and Away in late 2019, where he began appearing in 2020, during the show's 33rd season.

He has also appeared in Australian action films, Suka and Life After Fighting with Bren Foster.

== Filmography ==
| Year | Title | Role | Notes |
|---|---|---|---|
| 2020–present | Home and Away | Tane Parata | Series regular; Season 33— (960+ episodes) |
| 2023 | Suka | Jay | Film |
| 2024 | Life After Fighting | Samuel | Film |
