= Ana Thu Nguyen =

Australian actress

- Born: Indonesia
- Education: University of Sydney
- Occupation: Actress
- Years active: 2022–present

Ana Thu Nguyen is an Australian actress of Vietnamese descent. She is best known for playing Sindel in the film Mortal Kombat II (2026).

== Early life and education ==
Nguyen was born to Vietnamese parents in a refugee camp in Indonesia. Her family were granted asylum to Australia when she was an infant, and Nguyen was raised in Sydney. Nguyen completed a double degree in law and commerce at the University of Sydney.

== Career ==
After graduating from the University of Sydney, Nguyen worked as a consultant. After several years, Nguyen decided to quit consulting and pursue her lifelong dream of acting.

Nguyen made her film debut in 2022, portraying the character Lollypop in the film The Spy Who Never Dies. In 2023, Nguyen portrayed Rose, an executive assistant, in the Paramount+ Australian television program One Night. She also appeared in the Australian action drama film Suka, and starred in Dan Widdowson's film Get Free. Additionally, it was announced that Nguyen was cast as Sindel in the Warner Bros. Pictures film Mortal Kombat II (2026).

Nguyen was cast in Australian director Luke Sparke's film Primitive War, alongside Jeremy Piven, Ryan Kwanten and Tricia Helfer.

== Filmography ==
=== Film ===
Year	Title	Role
2022	The Spy Who Never Dies	Lollypop
2023	Get Free	Ayesha
2023	Suka	Young Wasiya
2025	Primitive War	Con Nhen
2026	Mortal Kombat II	Sindel

=== Television ===
Year	Title	Role	Notes
2023	One Night	Rose	2 episodes
2025	NCIS: Sydney	Kim	1 episode
