= Suka (film) =

2023 film

- Directed by: Heidi Lee Douglas
- Written by: Tsu Shan Chambers; Lily Cheng
- Produced by: Tsu Shan Chambers
- Starring: Jenny Wu; Paul He
- Cinematography: Casimir Dickson
- Edited by: Kenny Ang
- Music by: Me-Lee Hay
- Release date: 2023
- Running time: 84 minutes
- Country: Australia
- Language: English

Suka is a 2023 Australian action drama film directed by Heidi Lee Douglas.

== Cast ==
- Jenny Wu as Hui Dawood
- Paul He as Yun Bo Yang
- Grace Huang as Fandi Yang
- Ethan Browne as Jay
- Tsu Shan Chambers as Wasiya Dawood
- Ana Thu Nguyen as Young Wasiya

== Plot ==
Two members of feuding families fall for each other.

== Production ==
Filming took place in Sydney in Mid 2022.

== Reception ==
The Age's capsule review gave it 3 stars stating "While some of the dialogue is a little wooden, the action springs to life during the many impressive fight sequences."

== Awards ==
- 13th AACTA Awards
  - Best Original Music Score - Me-Lee Hay - nominated
