= Nicholas Cartwright =

Australian actor

- Born: 16 October 1988 (age 37)
- Citizenship: Australia
- Education: National Institute of Dramatic Art; Australian Institute of Music
- Occupation: Actor
- Years active: 2001, 2018–present

Nicholas Cartwright is an Australian actor and former soldier, best known for playing Constable Cash Newman on the soap opera Home and Away since 2021.

== Early life and career ==
At the age of 13, Cartwright first appeared on television in an episode of the medical drama series, All Saints. He completed his Higher School Certificate at the Australian Institute of Music in Sydney. He then pursued a career in the Australian Army, where he was a rifleman in Afghanistan and East Timor for six years. After the army, he considered careers with the Australian Federal Police and the fire department. Instead, he decided to pursue a Bachelor of Fine Arts in Acting from the National Institute of Dramatic Art (NIDA) in Sydney, where he studied alongside his future Home and Away co-star, Ethan Browne.

Initially, he auditioned for the role of killer nurse, Lewis Hayes on the Seven Network soap opera Home and Away, with the role going to Luke Arnold. However, in 2021, he was cast as series regular, "hot cop", Cash Newman.

== Filmography ==
Year	Title	Role	Notes
2001	All Saints	Raffie Morgan	1 episode
2018	Dave & Theo	Sleeve Tattoo Gangster	1 episode (Mini Series)
2021–present	Home and Away	Cash Newman	Series regular (770+ Episodes)
