= Ziggy Astoni =

- Home and Away character
- Portrayed by: Sophie Dillman
- Duration: 2017–2023, 2025
- First appearance: 20 June 2017
- Last appearance: 19 March 2025
- Introduced by: Lucy Addario
In-universe information
- Occupation: Waitress; Mechanic
- Father: Ben Astoni
- Mother: Maggie Astoni
- Sisters: Coco Astoni
- Husband: Brody Morgan (2018–2020)
- Daughters: Izzy Astoni-Thompson; Daniella Thompson
- Grandfathers: Richard Walford
- Grandmothers: Diana Walford
- Uncles: Marco Astoni

Ziggy Astoni is a fictional character from the Australian television soap opera Home and Away, played by Sophie Dillman. Dillman was working as a day surgery nurse in Sydney when she auditioned for the role of Ziggy. She booked a holiday to Vietnam shortly afterward, but four days before she was due to leave, she was informed that she had won the role. Dillman joined the cast alongside Rohan Nichol, Kestie Morassi and Anna Cocquerel, who play Ziggy's parents Ben and Maggie Astoni and sister Coco Astoni respectively. The Astonis were the first nuclear family to be introduced to Home and Away in 17 years. Ziggy was the first member of the family to appear and she made her debut during the episode broadcast on 20 June 2017. She is portrayed as feisty, rebellious, and confident. Dillman felt that she and Ziggy were quite similar, but she admitted that unlike her character she could not surf and was not into cars. The Astoni family relocate from the city to Summer Bay and are given immediate links within the community. Ziggy is reunited with Brody Morgan (Jackson Heywood), who helped her hide from Ben after she stole a car, while Maggie finds employment at the local high school.

Writers soon established a romantic relationship between Ziggy and Brody, which is tested by Brody's drug addiction and Ben's opposition. Ziggy is brought into Brody's addiction storyline when she is kidnapped and held hostage by his dealer William Zannis (Caleb Alloway). Ben's continued opposition to Ziggy and Brody's relationship leads them to continue it in secret. When Ben finds out, he asks Ziggy to leave the house, which leads to the couple's break-up, as Brody does not want to be responsible for tearing a family apart. Heywood commented that his character loves Ziggy, but in order to do his best by her he feels that he has to keep away. Writers then used Ziggy to explore the issue of drink spiking, which Dillman described as "a really heavy storyline". The plot also explored the family's fictional backstory, as it emerges that Ziggy is partially responsible for an incident that left Maggie with PTSD. Ziggy's guilt over this drives her away from the Bay to a bar, where a man spikes her drink with the intention of assaulting her. Ziggy and Brody's reconciliation scenes aired towards the end of 2017. A brief love triangle was introduced into the story arc when Ziggy's former boyfriend tries to win her back.

The following year, Ziggy and Brody get engaged, after Ziggy is prompted to propose by her mother's cancer diagnosis. The wedding ceremony was filmed at the Ku-ring-gai Chase National Park. The couple's marriage immediately faces challenges from their struggle to live together and questions over whether they rushed into it. Dillman said that while Brody is focused on their future, Ziggy wants to have some fun. Further problems arise when Brody begins spending time with budding chef Simone Bedford (Emily Eskell). Ziggy is shown becoming suspicious of the closeness between Simone and Brody, and she tries to fix her marriage by considering having a baby to make Brody happy. The marriage comes to an end when Ziggy discovers Brody is having an affair with Simone. Dillman said the moment leaves her character "absolutely heartbroken". She also called the scenes challenging to film and said they took an "emotional toll" on her personally. She also received massages from viewers who were going through something similar and found that the divorce resonated with those of a similar age as Ziggy. Producers soon established a relationship between Ziggy and Dean Thompson (Patrick O'Connor). The pair initially grow close when Ziggy parties to forget her marriage breakdown, but their romance is solidified when they take part in a car rally together. Dillman thought the couple were well suited, as they shared the same interests and were very similar people.

The relationship faces its biggest challenge when Ziggy is offered a trial as a pit crew mechanic, which means she has to leave the Bay and Dean. Dillman believed Ziggy was torn between her heart and her dream job. Dillman enjoyed filming the storyline at the track and was taught how to pull the tyres off the car. The end to the couple's relationship aired in September 2020, as Ziggy learns that Dean helped cover up a murder. Dillman admitted that she and O'Connor found the break-up scenes to be really sad, but they were proud of their work. Ziggy is later paired romantically with Tane Parata (Ethan Browne), after he begins working at the garage. Both actors thought their characters were good together. However, after Dean is seriously injured in a car accident during the show's 2021 season finale, Ziggy ends the relationship with Tane to reconcile with Dean. O'Connor believed the pair to be soulmates. Towards the end of 2022, writers scripted an unexpected pregnancy for the character just as she is offered a surfing sponsorship. Dillman said the plot showed how a lot of women feel like they have to choose, especially those in professional sports. After opting to go through with the pregnancy, Ziggy gives birth to her and Dean's daughter in January 2023. The following month, Home and Away aired Ziggy and Dean's exit after both Dillman and O'Connor decided to leave the show. They made a brief return in March 2025 for a storyline filmed and set in Queensland. For her portrayal of Ziggy, Dillman has earned Logie Award nominations for Most Popular New Talent and Most Popular Actress. She also received a nomination for Best Daytime Star at the Inside Soap Awards in the UK.

== Casting ==
On 4 June 2017, Karlie Rutherford of The Daily Telegraph reported Sophie Dillman had joined the cast of Home and Away as part of the Astoni family, alongside Rohan Nichol, Kestie Morassi, and Anna Cocquerel. The actors had been photographed filming their first scenes earlier in the year. Dillman was working as a day surgery nurse when she received the role of Ziggy. She had moved to Sydney to pursue her acting career and spent her evenings attending auditions. When she first auditioned for Home and Away she immediately fell in love with the character of Ziggy. Feeling "disheartened" about her lack of acting work, Dillman booked a holiday to Vietnam, but four days before she was due to leave, she learned she had been cast as Ziggy. She was swapping her scrubs after a patient vomited on her when she noticed that she had missed a call from her agent. She said "I couldn't believe it, I got the role of Ziggy on Home And Away. I screamed and swore so loudly that I got in trouble from one of the doctors. But I told them I didn't care and I wasn't coming back." The Astonis were the first nuclear family to be introduced to Home and Away in 17 years. Their arrival was preceded by a promotional trailer, which showed them visiting the fictional town of Summer Bay. Dillman made her debut as Ziggy on 20 June 2017.

== Development ==
=== Characterisation and introduction ===
Ahead of the character's introduction, a press release stated "Ziggy is a feisty and passionate 19-year-old who often feels like the odd one out in her family. She feels driven to rebel and act-out. She's confident and fierce, but she's lost in herself." The show's official website at 7plus states that Ziggy is "a high school dropout working casual jobs". Although lost, she is a "fierce female who doesn't take no for an answer." Karlie Rutherford of The Daily Telegraph described Ziggy as a "wild child" and a "rebel teenager". The character's profile at TVNZ states that she "has a sharp wit, and is often driven to lash out". They also stated that she loves her family and is particularly close to her father. Dillman felt that she and Ziggy were quite similar and she admired her character's fearlessness and confidence, saying "She doesn't worry about what she looks like, who she is friends with or what she says. Ziggy has really found herself and her stride from a really young age and I love that." Unlike Ziggy, Dillman cannot surf and admitted that she had tried several times, but she was uncoordinated. She also did not share Ziggy's passion for her job as a mechanic. Dillman thought Ziggy deserved "to let off a little steam and enjoy herself" in 2021. She pointed out that Ziggy has been working hard in the garage and had not had a lot of time off to do the things she loves, likes surfing and spending time with her friends.

Ziggy was the first member of the Astoni family to be introduced when she bursts into a public bathroom and asks Brody Morgan (Jackson Heywood) to help hide her. Dillman explained to Tamara Cullen of TV Week that Ziggy is running away from "an issue" she has caused in the city and happens to run into the same bathroom where Brody is "having a moment." Brody helps Ziggy to hide in his car as her father Ben Astoni (Nichol) comes out looking for her. Dillman told Cullen: "Brody questions what he's doing, but Ziggy doesn't give him a choice. She's only worried about not getting in trouble." When Ziggy returns home, she finds Ben waiting for her and he chastises her for stealing a car and fleeing the scene. Ziggy's mother Maggie Astoni (Morassi) and her younger sister Coco Astoni (Cocquerel) return home and it emerges that Coco has been suspended from school, leading Cullen to comment that the girls appear to have a rebellious streak. Dillman added that "They're a normal family. But they're trying to make things work with two kids." The family take a trip away from the city and end up in Summer Bay, where they spend the day at the beach. When it is time for them to leave, they discover their car will not start and they are stuck in the Bay until it is fixed. Brody and Ziggy meet again at the Surf Club, where Ziggy turns down Brody's offer to show her around. The family stay at the caravan park and Ziggy "makes her own entertainment" by stealing from the local residents and receiving a warning from the police. Ben and Maggie soon move the family to the Bay permanently, after Maggie secures a job at the local high school and Ben decides on a career change. Ziggy is against the idea and flees back to the city, where she finds her boyfriend Jarrod McGregor (Joel Davies) in bed with another girl. She soon returns to the Bay.

=== Relationship with Brody Morgan ===
"She has a real zest for life – even in her most rebellious moments she's a ball of sunshine. That's a really great thing to help Brody out of his addiction. She's so caring and non-judgemental. That's just what he needs right now."

— Heywood on how Ziggy helps Brody (2017)

The trailer promoting the Astoni family showed Ziggy becoming a love interest for Brody. Brody and Ziggy spend time together and agree not to talk about their pasts. They eventually share a kiss, however, Ben puts a stop to a potential relationship when he discovers Brody is a drug addict. Brody's addiction directly affects Ziggy when she is kidnapped by his dealer William Zannis (Caleb Alloway). After noticing that she and Brody are close, Zannis approaches Ziggy at the beach and has her bundled into a car, before holding her hostage at a motel. Zannis instructs Ziggy to send a text to Brody asking him to meet her, but she initially refuses until Zannis produces a gun. Dillman told Inside Soap's Sarah Ellis: "Ziggy won't go down without a fight! When she figures out that this is a kidnapping, she tries everything she can to protect Brody." When Brody arrives at the motel, he is grabbed by Zannis' henchmen and tied to a chair. Ellis noted that Brody feels "terrible guilt" for dragging Ziggy into his problems, especially when Zannis tells them that he plans to kill them both with an overdose. Constable Kat Chapman (Pia Miller) soon find the pair, after tacking Brody to the motel, but she is knocked out by one of Zannis' henchmen. Dillman told Ellis that Ziggy and Brody are "scared beyond belief" because "it's clear Zannis is dangerous and out of control." Zannis then decides to move the hostages, but as they reach the car, the group are confronted by Robbo (Jake Ryan), who was waiting in Kat's police vehicle, and Ziggy and Brody are rescued.

Following her kidnapping, Ben orders Ziggy to stay away from Brody. She agrees, but then goes to see him. Dillman commented "Ziggy definitely sees Brody as something more." Ziggy tells Brody that he is the only person who understands what she felt during the ordeal and they share a kiss, while agreeing to keep their relationship a secret. Dillman stated that Ziggy knows her father has a temper and would not react well to the relationship. When Brody's brother and Ziggy's boss, Justin Morgan (James Stewart) finds the couple sneaking out of Brody's bedroom, things are "super-awkward" between them all. Justin threatens to tell Ben, as they are good friends and knows that he would want to protect his daughter, but Brody and Ziggy beg him not to. Brody later suggests they tell Ben and Maggie that they are together, but Ziggy reacts badly to the suggestion. Dillman explained "She knows it will go badly, and she really doesn't want her relationship with Brody to end." The relationship is exposed when Ben finds a condom wrapper in the garbage. Dillman said the audience has already seen how Ben overreacts, which is why Ziggy keeps things from her family. Another a date with Brody, Ziggy returns home to "an ambush" from Ben. She begs him to give Brody a chance, but he asks her to leave the house instead and she flees to the Morgan's. Brody does not want to be responsible for tearing a family apart and Heywood stated: "He loves her. Which makes it so much harder, because if he wants to do the best by her, he kind of has to keep his distance." Brody then suggests that they break up.

=== Drink spiking ===
Writers used the character to explore the issue of drink spiking, which Dillman said was "a really heavy storyline" for Ziggy. Talking to Stephen Downie of TV Week, Dillman told him that she knew a lot of people that had had their drinks spiked. She explained that Rohypnol is often used, leaving people unable to remember anything that has happened. She thought it was "really sad" for women to have to be worried about spiking and to constantly watch their drinks. The plot starts with Coco learning that Ziggy was one of the teens who broke into the high school where Maggie previously worked, leaving her injured. Dillman said Ziggy has been "so ashamed" of her involvement in that night, and it was her guilt that drives her away from the Bay. Brody and her friend Olivia Fraser Richards (Raechelle Banno) try to bring her home, but Ziggy refuses and goes to a bar in the city. Dillman stated "She's hit rock bottom. She doesn't want to admit she needs the help of her friends." A vulnerable Ziggy is surrounded by "leering" men and when she goes to the bathroom, one of them, Curtis (Taylor Wiese), slips a drug into her drink. Ziggy becomes disorientated and Curtis leads her out through a back exit to an alley, where she is seemingly going to be assaulted. Dillman said her character has no idea what is happening, which is "a really scary situation for Ziggy to be in." Before Curtis can assault Ziggy, Brody scares him off and he and Olivia put "a delirious" Ziggy in the car. On the way back to the Bay, Ziggy forces them to stop so she can be sick. Brody attempts to help Ziggy, but she yells at him, attracting the attention of Ben, who misunderstands the situation and punches Brody. Ziggy later tells Maggie about her part in the school incident that left her with migraines and PTSD.

=== Marriage to Brody Morgan ===
Towards the end of 2017, Ziggy and Brody start spending time together again, and Ben gives them his blessing to be friends. Daniel Kilkelly of Digital Spy noted there was "clearly a spark between Brody and Ziggy", which does not go unnoticed by Ben. He makes it clear that he does not want them to date, but Maggie does not agree with him and tells Ziggy to be with Brody if she loves him. Shortly after, writers introduced a love triangle into the story arc, as Ziggy's former boyfriend Jarrod McGregor comes to the Bay in a bid to win her back. Dillman told an Inside Soap writer that the last time Ziggy saw Jared, he was in bed with another girl, so she still hates him. She continued, "Plus she really likes Brody, and they are just getting to a good place in their relationship. So she doesn't want to ruin that." Jared continues pursuing Ziggy and after taking her out for a ride on his motorbike, he kisses her. Dillman told the writer that her character needs closure with Jared, so when he kisses her, it confirms to her that she never wants to do that again. Dillman also said that Ziggy sees her future as being with Brody. In a feature for PerthNow, Dillman told reporter Karlie Rutherford that Heywood was the first person she had kissed on-screen. When she admitted that she was nervous, she knew that Heywood understood and said he was "so great to work with." Heywood told Rutherford that he enjoyed filming a romance plot, especially after his character's "drama heavy" early storylines.

In June 2018, the serial aired scenes featuring the couple's engagement. Ziggy is prompted to propose after reading a goodbye letter from Maggie, who has been diagnosed with cancer. The rest of the family are hurt that Maggie appears to be giving up, and Dillman said that finding the letters like that is "so shocking and emotional all at once." Maggie tells them that she wrote the letters just in case she does die. Ziggy eventually reads her letter and learns that Maggie is afraid of not seeing her get married, which gives her the idea to propose. Dillman told Downie (TV Week) that Ziggy "always backs her decisions" and she wants to make her mother happy. Downie noted that the couple had not been together very long, but Dillman told him that Ziggy knows she wants to be with Brody, and the pair were "stronger than ever and falling more and more in love." Ziggy arranges for her friends and family to gather outside Brody's restaurant Salt, before she unfurls a large "Marry me?" banner over the side of the balcony. While everyone is celebrating the engagement, Maggie takes Ziggy aside to ask if she genuinely wants to marry Brody or is she only doing it because of the letter, but Ziggy is sure that she wants to marry Brody. Brody overhears the conversation and calls off the engagement, leading Ben to visit him and make him see that he and Ziggy are made for one another. Brody then makes his own banner with "yes" written on it, and the engagement is back on.

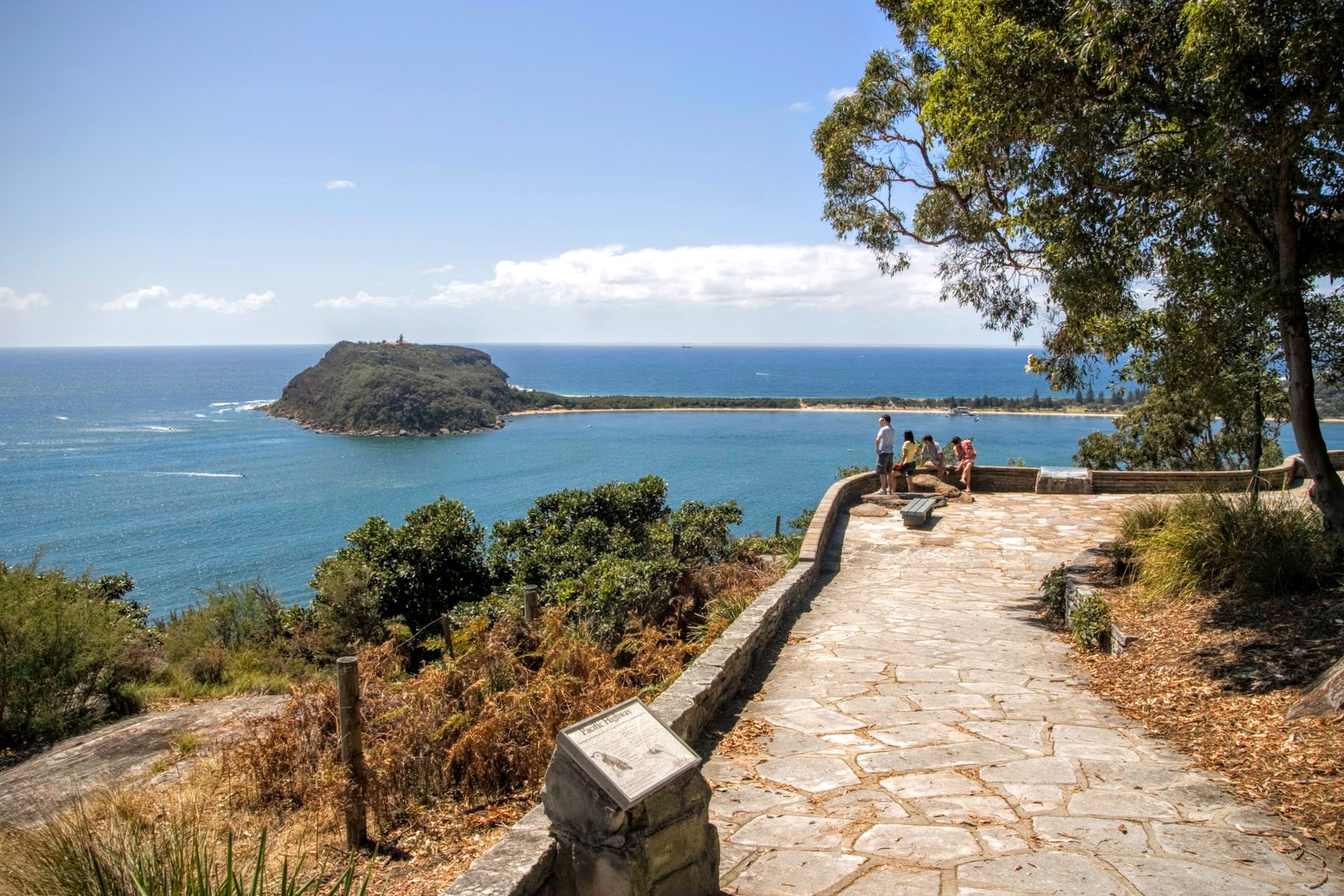
Ziggy and Brody's wedding was filmed at the Ku-ring-gai Chase National Park.

Home and Away aired Brody and Ziggy's wedding on 28 June 2018. In the lead up to the ceremony, Coco arranges a sedate hens' night at the farmhouse, but it soon becomes obvious that Ziggy is not happy, though she tells Coco that she is just tired. Of Ziggy's state of mind, Dillman said "She loves Brody more than anything. But Ziggy is young and the engagement was really quick. It's a bit scary for her." On the day of the ceremony, Ziggy continues to have doubts and turns to Maggie for advice. Dillman explained that after everything they have been through, Ziggy desperately needs her mother's support and wants to make the right decision. After receiving a text message from Brody, Ziggy puts her nerves aside and gets ready. Dillman believed that Ziggy's nerves got the best of her for a while, but she realises that there are "many awesome things ahead for them." The wedding scenes were filmed at the Ku-ring-gai Chase National Park and featured the majority of the cast. Dillman called the ceremony "beautiful" and said the location made them feel "like we were floating above the world." Ziggy wears a lace and tulle gown as she walks down the aisle with Ben, before exchanging vows with Brody.

Following the wedding, Brody moves in with the Astonis, leadings to tension between the couple when they struggle to find alone time. Heywood thought Brody and Ziggy were experiencing "the teething problems of marriage". Brody is pushed to the edge when his attempts to spend time with Ziggy are thwarted by her family. Heywood believed the wedding put stress on Brody and moving into the farmhouse felt like a backwards step to him. When a planned date night becomes a family event, Brody "snaps" and leaves the house. Further problems cause the couple to believe they have rushed into marriage. When Brody cancels plans for a romantic day together, Ziggy spends the afternoon drinking with Dean Thompson (Patrick O'Connor) at the garage. Explaining how Ziggy is feeling, Dillman told New Idea's Jackie Brygel: "Ziggy is still really young – she's only 20 – and now she's married, but she just wants to let loose a bit. Brody is very focused on the future and wanting to have babies, and that's overwhelming for Ziggy. She's rebelling a little because she feels she needs to have some fun." When Brody finds the pair together, he accuse Dean of deliberately getting Ziggy drunk. Dillman felt sorry for Dean as he was always getting blamed for things, and said that her character knows it was her fault, which is why she attempts to defend him. She also thought Ziggy and Brody were in "a very different headspace."

Producers created further problems for the couple with the introduction of Simone Bedford (Emily Eskell) in November 2018. Simone wins a cooking lesson with Brody through a silent auction. Eskell commented that her character has a "career crush" on Brody and cannot wait to work with him. Meanwhile, Ziggy and Brody spend the day arguing after she gets involved in Justin's relationship with Willow Harris (Sarah Roberts). The following day, Ziggy visits Salt to "mend fences" with Brody and watches him and Simone working together, where she sees Simone "brazenly" flirting with her husband. Ziggy is shown becoming suspicious of the closeness between Simone and Brody. Wanting to expose Simone's flirting, Ziggy spends her free time at Salt and asks Simone about her future plans as a chef. She offers Simone some of Brody's contacts in the city, but when she goes to get his phone, she finds Simone's and sees a picture of her and Brody set as the background. Ziggy "angrily" confronts Simone, but Brody defends her and asks Ziggy to leave. Ziggy becomes suspicious when Simone continues to work at Salt, but decides to focus on the Bay's half-marathon event. Brody initially says he will watch and support her, but soon changes his mind. Dillman told Cullen (TV Week) that "As a woman, deep down, Ziggy knows something's wrong. But she has too much trust in their relationship, and in Brody." Dillman also told Cullen that Ziggy realises Brody has becoming more distant since the wedding. During the marathon, Ziggy struggles with the heat and becomes dizzy. When she crosses the finish line, she collapses with heatstroke. Coco and Leah Patterson (Ada Nicodemou) attempt to locate Brody, who is with Simone.

Ziggy tries to repair her marriage and even considers having a baby with Brody to make him happy. Speaking to Sarah Ellis of Inside Soap, Dillman explained that things between the couple have been "strange" for while, which does not make sense to Ziggy because she feels she has offered Brody everything she thought he wanted. Ziggy believes that Brody is stressed about the restaurant and almost feels bad that he cannot seem to rely on her for support. Ziggy soon walks in on Brody and Simone in bed together in Simone's caravan. Dillman said the moment leaves her character "absolutely heartbroken, and in disbelief. Their marriage is completely torn to shreds." Ziggy goes home to pack her belongings, where Brody finds her and tries to explain. Dillman told Ellis that Ziggy still loves Brody and hopes they can fix their marriage, but she later overhears Brody admitting that he is in love with Simone. Dillman called it "the final nail in the coffin", as Ziggy realises that he fell out of love with her and now loves someone else. Ziggy then moves back in with her parents. Dillman joked that if she were in Ziggy's position, she would kill Brody. But she felt that the best thing about the storyline was how "honest" the writing is, explaining "Ziggy feels it all, and the audience gets to go on that journey with her." She added that while the scenes were challenging to film, she also felt that they were rewarding. Dillman later said that despite the "emotional toll" the story took on her during filming, she found that the divorce resonated with viewers the same age as Ziggy, who sent her messages about how they were going through something similar.

=== Relationship with Dean Thompson ===
Soon after the end of Ziggy's marriage, writers began establishing a romantic connection between her and Dean (O'Connor). On her 21st birthday, Ziggy plans to "wallow" in her room, until Ben convinces her to go surfing with him. They meet Dean at the beach, where he realises the date and the reason for Ziggy's "terrible mood". In a bid to cheer her up, Dean brings her to the caravan park, where he has arranged for a case of beer and a cupcake for her. Ziggy is pleased to have a distraction and Dillman commented "She's definitely just trying to do whatever she can to keep going." As the afternoon goes on, a tension grows between the pair and when Dean goes into his caravan to get some water, Ziggy follows and kisses him. Dean kisses her back, but when she says that she wants to forget everything, Dean pulls back and Ziggy runs off. Ziggy begins partying and drinking, and her reckless behaviour soon affects Dean. The plot begins with Ziggy learning that Brody is leaving town with Simone, after she meets him while returning home from another night out in the city. Ziggy appears indifferent to his announcement, but she is actually "crushed" by it. She meets Mark (Sam Delich) at the beach and they arrange to meet later at the caravan park. Dean sees the pair together and later keeps an eye on Ziggy as she parties with Mark and his friends. When Mark makes unwanted romantic advances towards Ziggy, Dean intervenes and takes her home. On his return to the caravan park, Mark and his friends attack Dean and leave him by the side of the road. Ben finds Dean in the morning and takes him home, where a "shocked and horrified" Ziggy realises Dean was hurt trying to help her. The incident appears to be "the harsh wake-up call" she needs to stop partying.

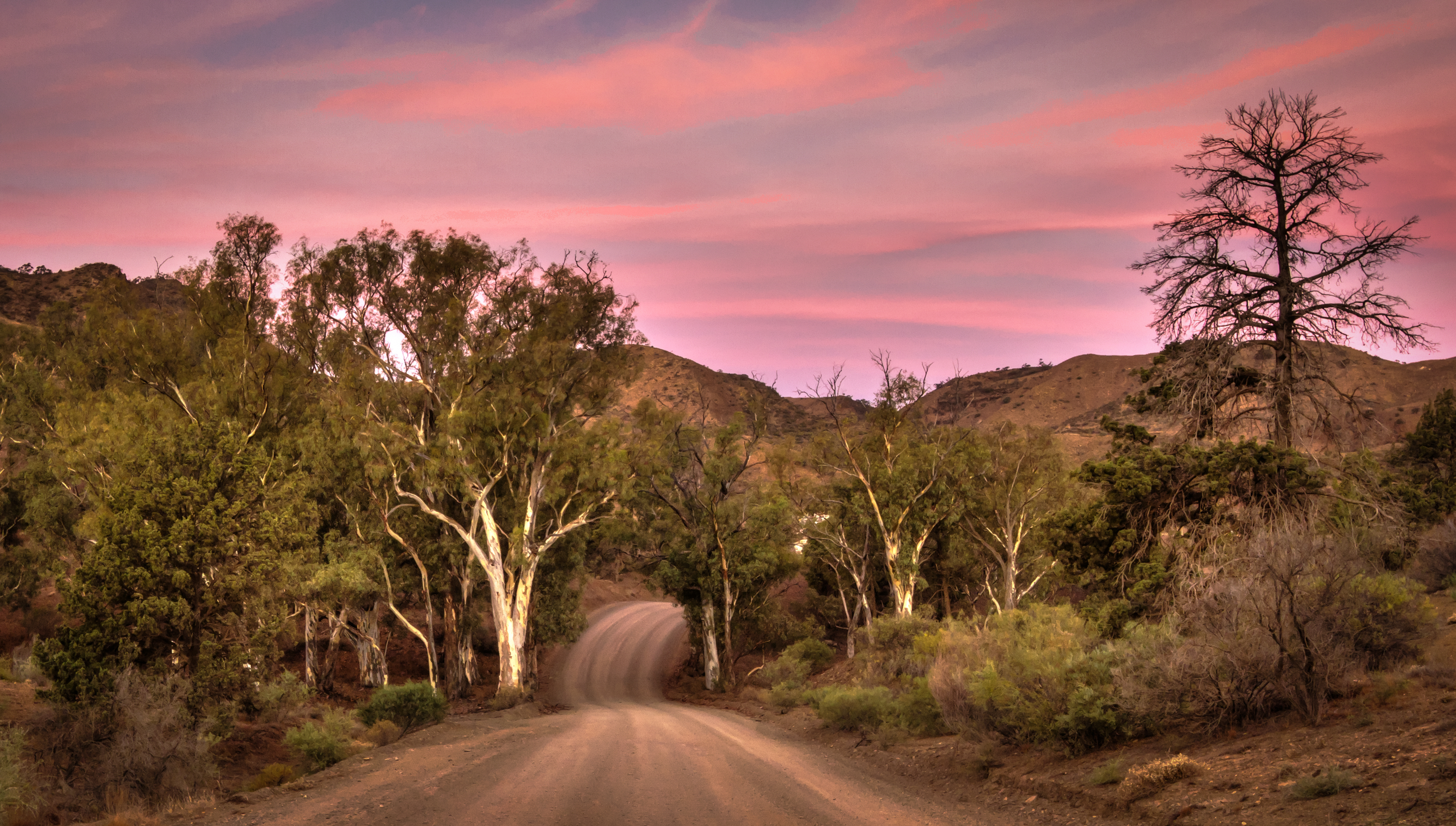
Ziggy and Dean's relationship becomes serious when they take part in a car rally in Parachilna (pictured).

When Maggie suggests Ziggy takes part in the Bush Bomb Rally, it leads to her and Dean forming a romantic relationship. As Ziggy finalises details, she asks Dean to come along with her and O'Connor commented "He's a little anxious about it. He knows what it means for just the two of them to go away, especially with what's recently happened with Willow." Dean agrees and the pair set off, but unbeknownst to them Bella Nixon (Courtney Miller) is hiding in the boot. When they get to the starting point, they discover Bella and Ziggy leaves Dean to deal with her. Bella wants to take him back to the Bay to be with Willow, as she fears that Dean and Ziggy being together will "destroy her unconventional family unit." Dean then calls Bella's brother Colby Thorne (Tim Franklin) to collect her. Ziggy and Dean continue with the rally and they befriend fellow drivers Paul (Gary Clementson) and Tanya (Georgia Scott), who reveal that Paul has terminal cancer. O'Connor said this leads to a "revelation" for Dean and it prompts him to kiss Ziggy, however, she initially appears unmoved by the gesture.

The pair soon sort things out between them. Dillman thought that the relationship was a way for the pair to "start afresh" instead of it being a rebound romance for them both. She told Vanessa Williams of The West Australian: "They are very similar, so when you look at them, it makes sense. I think it's a combination of them having similar interests and values and especially how good a person Dean is wanting to help Ziggy get through this. I think that's what started everything. They get along because they don't sugar coat anything with each other." She thought viewers would like Ziggy and Dean as a couple, pointing out that they were both different to how they were in their previous relationships. She also thought viewers would "vouch for them", particularly Ziggy because she has been through a lot in a short time and now she can be herself. The rally scenes were filmed in Parachilna and Dillman was excited for the storyline, as she had wanted Ziggy to become "a race car driver".

After spending a few extra days together, Ziggy and Dean return to the Bay, but are unsure what happens next. O'Connor explained "When they get back, they know what they want. But they don't know how they can make that work in the Bay." The pair separate and return to their homes, where Ziggy avoids all questions about Dean from her family. The pair eventually establish a relationship and Dean is welcoming to the family by Ben and Maggie. Ziggy and Dean become more comfortable with one another and enjoy a "honeymoon period". However, this is soon tested by Ziggy's discovery of a large amount of money in Dean's caravan. She becomes suspicious that he is up to something "dodgy" when he receives several phone calls. He later reveals that the money is from his estranged father.

Dean and Ziggy's relationship faces a bigger test five months later, when Ziggy is offered a trial as a pit crew mechanic. Dean initially hears about the job opportunity from Maggie, and Ziggy later admits that she was too scared to tell him, as accepting the offer will mean she has to leave the Bay. Dean states that he does not want Ziggy to go when she asks for his blessing. Dillman told Maddison Hockey of TV Week that Ziggy is "torn between her heart and her dream job." With the encouragement of her parents and Dean's eventual acceptance, Ziggy leaves for the racetrack and "the most exciting job she could have" according to Dillman. Dean later confesses to Ben that he fears that he is going to lose Ziggy, especially as his phone calls have gone unanswered. However, Ziggy is actually being pressured to perform well by her instructor Kurt (Dylan Hare). Later, while talking with the driver, Alana Bentley (Erin Clare), Ziggy is advised not to let anything get in the way of her passion, including love. Dillman told Hockey that Ziggy is there to work hard, so when Dean makes an unannounced visit, Ziggy is "furious."

The couple briefly break-up when Ziggy is offered a permanent role with the crew, which she puts off telling Dean about until the last minute. Unaware that he has seen a message from Kurt on her phone, Ziggy breaks the news to Dean, who interrupts to say that because she did not consider his feelings, they are over. Dillman enjoyed filming the storyline at the track. She explained that a full racetrack team was present and they taught her how to pull the tyres off the car. She admitted to feeling "powerful" about being able to do it. She was glad that Ziggy turned down the permanent job in the end, calling her "a simple pleasures kind of gal." She added that Ziggy "really enjoys her life, she loves surfing, she loves cars, she loves Dean and she loves her family – and all of those things are in Summer Bay." After reconciling, Ziggy and Dean's relationship become "the one stable thing in her life". Off-screen, Dillman and O'Connor began a real life relationship. Dillman explained that they had both attended the same acting school, but were not close friends until they started working together. When their characters were paired together, they found that they enjoyed each other's company. Dillman commented that she was lucky. She also called it "convenient", as they were able to practice their lines and talk about their scenes together.

Ziggy ends the relationship in scenes airing in September 2020 when she learns that Dean played a part in the cover up of Ross Nixon's (Justin Rosniak) murder. Sarah Ellis of Inside Soap pointed out that the relationship was already on "shaky ground" after Dean learned he was a father. Dillman said Ziggy is "unbelievably happy" for Dean, but she also feels pushed out of his world. When Ziggy learns the truth about Ross, Dillman explained that the news "really challenges Ziggy's sense of self, and her moral compass." Upon receiving the script for the scenes, Dillman tried to imagine how she would react if someone she loved revealed they were a murderer and she admitted that she "couldn't even fathom it." She also said that Ziggy hates being lied to and feels foolish for missing something again. When asked if Ziggy would ever report Dean to the police, Dillman replied "That's the question – what wins, head or heart?" She went on to say that Ziggy just takes things one day at a time, but realises she cannot talk to anyone, as they are either involved in the murder or cannot know about it. Dillman admitted that she and O'Connor watched the break-up scenes together and found them to be really sad. They were also proud of the work that went into the story and hoped that the viewers enjoyed it. Dillman added that she and O'Connor liked playing a couple on-screen, as their relationship helped them to be "really compatible" as acting partners.

=== Paternity doubts ===
The introduction of Ben's brother and Ziggy's uncle Marco Astoni (Tim Walter) in March 2020 led to further exploration of the Astoni family's fictional backstory. Early scenes explained that the brothers became estranged after Ben assaulted Marco when he saw him arguing with Maggie, whom Marco has been in love with for a number of years. Marco comes to the Bay to reconcile with Ben and invite him to join in a business deal. Ben loses his temper upon seeing Marco at his birthday party, but Ziggy helps defuse the situation and the brothers soon reconcile. However, Maggie is left feeling "on edge" around Marco and it appears that she does not want him around. It is soon revealed that Marco and Maggie had a one-night stand while she and Ben went through a temporary break up, and Marco uses this to blackmail Maggie. In an interview with Johnathon Hughes of the Radio Times, Dillman pointed out that "technically" Maggie did not cheat on Ben, as they were broken up. She had sex with Marco and got back together with Ben the following day, before marrying and having Ziggy. Maggie eventually tells Ben the truth about Marco and Ziggy witnesses the resulting confrontation between the brothers, which leads her to do some calculations and realise that her uncle could actually be her biological father. Of this, Dillman stated: "When Marco first turned up in Summer Bay, Ziggy did all she could to help form a new beginning between him and Maggie and Ben. Marco made a big plea to start afresh with his brother, and Ziggy thought she saw some genuine care and regret in Marco's eyes. She thought she was helping her father and his brother – and they did temporarily reunite – but now this discovery changes everything."

Dillman explained Ziggy's shock by pointing out that Marco had always been a distant relation for almost all of her life and now she suddenly learns this news. She told Hughes that Ziggy feels "betrayed" and "a bit lost" at the idea of Ben not being her father. Dillman also said Ziggy was "heartbroken" that Maggie had never said anything about something that could affect her whole life. She continued, "She's feeling every emotion coloured with rage – remember, Ziggy's had her heart broken by Brody, so her mum's deceit gets to her." Maggie insists that Ben is Ziggy's father, but the possibility of that not being true hangs over the family, until Ziggy decides to do a paternity test. Dillman said that Ziggy is reluctant to do the test, as she feels that Ben is her father, but they need to find out for sure. The results confirm Ben is Ziggy's father and Dillman described the moment as "a huge sigh of relief" for her character. The storyline becomes "one of the biggest challenges yet" for the Astoni family, as they struggle to deal with the lie. Ziggy and Ben freeze Maggie out, while Marco remains in the Bay. Dillman thought that he was after some redemption, but she also wondered if he was still in love with Maggie. She added "The Astonis have gone through so much. They are a tight unit and nothing can break them, they love each other and are in it together no matter how hard things get."

=== Relationship with Tane Parata ===
Writers soon paired Ziggy with Tane Parata (Ethan Browne), after he begins working at the garage. Browne told Inside Soap's Sarah Ellis that Tane initially feels "really emasculated", as he thought he would be working on the cars, but he is actually employed to sweep the floor. He tells Ziggy about his old life, when he had respect and women, which leads him to arrange "a dodgy job" with a contact. Ziggy learns what he is up to when he hides a van full of stolen goods at the garage and it is not picked up. Browne thought Ziggy was a good confidant for Tane, saying "she cares about people, and she sees the good in him. They banter, and get along really easily. They enjoy each other's company." Sarah Ellis from Inside Soap noted that there was "simmering sexual tension" between the characters. Dillman told Ellis that she was not sure if Ziggy was ready to forgive Dean and move onto a new relationship, but she felt that her character deserved some fun after all the drama she had endured. She thought Tane was a good choice to bring that fun into Ziggy's life, but her character appeared to be in denial about her feelings for him, pointing out that often when someone has good chemistry with someone else, they themselves cannot see it, although it is obvious to those around them. When asked what makes Ziggy go for it with Tane, Dillman replied "A combination of things. The attraction, the want to be loved, her need to feel less alone, her spontaneous nature... and maybe a little Dutch courage, too!" Dillman felt it was the timing was good for the pair, as they were able to give each other what they needed at the right time. She joked that her character was due happier times, as she had cried enough.

Browne felt that the relationship was "a massive turning point" for his character, as Tane is willing to put aside the illegal activities to live "a more legit life" and take care of Ziggy. Browne described Ziggy as "a strong character" and said that Tane likes her because she is straight with him and is not scared to put him in his place. Browne also called her caring and nurturing, and said being with her makes Tane feel good about himself. Browne admitted that the show's viewers might be "resistant" about the relationship, as Ziggy and Dean were a popular couple. But he thought there were some sweet moments between Ziggy and Tane and he hoped that fans would see how special relationship could be. As the relationship progresses on-screen, Tane asks Ziggy if he can move in with her. Browne put this down to his character feeling more grown-up and settled. He feels that Ziggy is the woman he wants to settle down with, but he does worry that she will reject his offer. Dillman said Ziggy is "very freaked out" at first, as she worries that they are moving too fast. Dillman thought that this was down to Ziggy being scared of her past, so she does not know what to say. Browne told Ellis that Ziggy's hesitation leaves Tane feeling insecure and thinking that he has rushed into it. They receive advice from Ari Parata (Rob Kipa-Williams) and Mia Anderson (Anna Samson), who tells Ziggy that Tane has never asked anyone to move in with him before, which makes Ziggy realise he is serious about them. Of this, Dillman stated "Ziggy doesn't have her parents to be the voice of reason any more, so she definitely needs someone with more life experience to point her in the right direction." Both Dillman and Browne thought the couple were good together and their future looked good.

Following the events of the show's 2021 season finale, in which Dean is seriously injured in a car accident, Ziggy ends the relationship to reconcile with him. Dillman told Downie from TV Week that her character realised in the moment that she could not live without Dean. When she visits Dean in the hospital to tell him that she and Tane have broken up, the pair share a kiss which is seen by Tane. Dillman believed Ziggy was genuinely devastated about their break-up, especially as Tane has done nothing wrong and she did not want to hurt him. Dillman also said "She loves him, and he was such a great boyfriend and person, but she can't help still loving Dean."

=== Reconciliation with Dean Thompson and motherhood ===
Ziggy and Dean are reunited in the wake of his accident. O'Connor commented that "they were always soulmates." He said that they only broke up because of Dean's involvement in a murder, but his car accident helps put things into perspective for them. Dillman also said that for her character, she realised how easily life can be taken away from someone in an instant, so there was only one decision to be made in the wake of it. When asked if Ziggy is prepared to nurse Dean, Dillman believed she would, but it would depend on how serious Dean's injuries were. She thought that Ziggy might not be capable, as it was "a lot of pressure to put on somebody." Both actors stated that the show's viewers wanted Dean and Ziggy back together, but O'Connor joked that it might be because he and Dillman were together in real life. Dean's injuries and recovery take its toll on Ziggy and their relationship. Dillman pointed out that a full-time carer needs to be "so patient and gentle", and while Ziggy is kind, she is not a professional, so it has been challenging for her. She commented that Ziggy is used to working with cars, which do not talk back or have feelings. Ziggy is seen encouraging Dean to get back in the car and drive again, which Dillman put down to her wanting her life back. But Dillman also noted that Ziggy has not been involved in an accident like Dean's, so she cannot understand his anxiety, adding "she really has to swallow her pride, hunker down, and work out how she's going to help him." Ziggy works with new doctor Logan Bennett (Harley Bonner) to help Dean, and she eventually learns why Dean is reluctant to get behind the wheel again. Dillman said that Dean is appreciative when he sees how much effort she is putting in to help him.

Towards the end of 2022, writers scripted a pregnancy for the character. Ziggy is shown being conflicted about the news, as she has been offered a sponsorship after deciding to pursue her dream career of being a pro surfer. Dean is "elated" by the news, but he also notices Ziggy's conflict. Speaking to a writer from TV Week, Dillman explained that the storyline showed how a lot of women feel like they have to choose, especially those in professional sports. Contributing to Ziggy's dilemma is whether she wants to have children at all, as her past with Brody changed things for her. Dillman stated "When she was with Brody, she wanted a family, but he changed her mind as to whether that was going to happen [after cheating on her]." Dillman also explained that when Ziggy began dating Dean, she decided not to have children and now she is torn between pursuing her dream job or motherhood. Ziggy eventually decides to go ahead with the pregnancy and give up the surfing contract. Speaking to Kerry Harvey of Stuff, Dillman told her that it was "a difficult choice" for Ziggy, but she was allowed the time to make her choice and that is what she wanted to do. Dillman found the scenes to be "poignant" as they were filmed amidst the Roe v. Wade debate in the United States. She also found that scenes in which Ziggy tells Dean she is pregnant to be the "weirdest" moment of the storyline, admitting that she actually felt nervous just like her character. Dillman and O'Connor also had to deal with fans believing Dillman was pregnant in real-life. Dillman found her character's pregnancy to be fun, as she got to play out all of the symptoms of pregnancy without actually having them. A lot of what the character goes through on-screen were pulled from the scriptwriters' own experiences.

The birth of Ziggy and Dean's daughter aired in January 2023. Prior to the birth, the couple realise that they are not well prepared and Ziggy's due date is fast approaching. This coincides with the reappearance of Dean's mother Karen Thompson (Georgia Adamson), who comes to help the couple. However, her interreference and arguments with Dean, lead Ziggy to go into labour. Dillman said the labour is a shock to Ziggy and she struggles to remain calm when Karen insists on staying with the couple in the birthing suite. Dean, meanwhile, is caught between his partner and his mother, who just wants to see her grandchild being born. Dillman joked that "Ziggy is not happy at all." She pitied Dean as he had to deal with both women, while "copping" all of Ziggy's abuse. After Dean calls John Palmer (Shane Withington) to distract Karen, he returns to a "petrified" Ziggy and they finally get to meet their baby. The couple later name their daughter Izzy Thompson.

=== Departure and return ===
In December 2022, Rachel Choy of Yahoo! Entertainment reported on speculation that Dillman and O'Connor would be departing Home and Away during 2023, after fans had seen them filming goodbye scenes at Palm Beach and noticed their absence from a cast photo posted by Lynne McGranger, who plays Irene Roberts. Choy also noted that both actors had recently dyed their hair, which indicated that they were no longer contracted to the show.

In the 4–10 March 2023 issue of TV Week, both Dillman and O'Connor confirmed their departures from the show. Dillman admitted that they both found the decision to leave "incredibly hard", but they believed it was the right time to go. Dillman explained: "We have both done everything possible with our characters and it was time to start a new chapter." She called it "bittersweet and emotional", but they were both fortunate to have had such a long run in the show. O'Connor revealed the decision came about in 2022 when he celebrated his 30th birthday. The couple decided to relocate overseas and travel around Europe, which meant that they would have to leave the show. Both actors were grateful to Home and Away for changing their lives, with Dillman commenting "It's been the best part of my life. I've learnt so much. Everyone who was involved allowed us to do the best job in the world. I'm so honoured." O'Connor added that they were both open to returning in the future. Ziggy and Dean's departures aired on 9 March, as they decide to move to Queensland to be closer to Dean's son.

On 13 October 2024, Jade Brown of Digital Spy confirmed both Dillman and O'Connor would be reprising their respective roles for a storyline airing in 2025. The scenes were filmed on-location in the Whitsunday Region during late October. Of her return to Home and Away, Dillman commented "It feels so good to be home!" Further details about the character's return were revealed on 1 March 2025. Ziggy and Dean are visited by Dean's sister Mackenzie Booth (Emily Weir) and her partner Levi Fowler (Tristan Gorey), whom Dean does not like because he broke up his marriage to be with Mack. Ziggy encourages Dean to get along with Levi for Mack's sake, but he struggles. The two women are later kidnapped by two escaped prisoners, leaving Dean and Levi to work together to track them down. Ziggy and Dean's return scenes began airing on 10 March 2025. After the storyline concluded on 19 March, fans of the character called for her and Dean to return to the show on a more permanent basis.

== Reception ==
For her portrayal of Ziggy, Dillman earned a nomination for the Logie Award for Most Popular New Talent in 2018. The following year, she was nominated for Best Daytime Star at the Inside Soap Awards. In 2022, Dillman received a nomination for the Logie Award for Most Popular Actress.

Three reporters for The West Australian included Ziggy on their list of "Top 50 heroes we love and villains we hate". Naming her a "hero", they summed up her time in the Bay stating: "Initially a wild child character, Ziggy has won over the Bay and fans. Fiercely loyal, she has endured her fair share of love and heartbreak." Ahead of the show's 35th anniversary, the Back to the Bay website ran a poll to find viewers' favourite Home and Away character and Ziggy came in third place.

Of the character's early scenes, an Inside Soap writer observed that Ziggy has "certainly made a splash since arriving in the Bay". Dillman told the writer that she had received a lot of positive feedback from viewers, saying "People like seeing a female on screen who is sure of herself. But she's still a teenager, and it's nice to see her shortcomings as well." Jackie Brygel of New Idea observed that Dillman had become "undoubtedly one of Home and Aways most popular stars", while branding Ziggy a "fabulously feisty Summer Bay mechanic."

After Brody's infidelity was exposed, a critic for the Evening Express noted that "Ziggy's life has been thrown into turmoil by Brody and Simone's affair, and getting back on track won't be easy – especially as there's a chance she will bump into the couple every day. However, throwing herself at Dean isn't the answer to her problems." Stephanie McKenna of The West Australian praised Dillman for her "finest performance to date" when Ziggy learns that her parents are separating. She wrote "Never has there been such a fine piece of acting as this. Ziggy really embodies all the emotion and drama of that statement into a single jaw dropping facial expression. Clearly she didn't think of her parents breaking up as an option."

During her review of Ben and Maggie's departure, McKenna branded Ziggy "rather immature at the moment" and thought it was "an all too familiar scene." When Ziggy took her sadness out on Dean, McKenna wondered if it marked "the beginning of the end for one of our favourite couples." McKenna later found the character's reaction to being punched in the face "very underwhelming" compared to how she reacted to her parents' departure. McKenna admitted that she had been waiting for the moment when Ziggy and Tane got together since he started working at the garage. However she had grown bored of Dean declaring his love for Ziggy, writing "I feel like they've been repeating this bit for weeks so out of pure boredom, I have become content with her decision that she can't love a man that murdered dead Ross and buried him in a shallow grave."
