= Tane Parata =

- Home and Away character
- Portrayed by: Ethan Browne
- Duration: 2020–present
- First appearance: 10 February 2020
- Introduced by: Lucy Addario
In-universe information
- Occupation: Barman; Personal trainer
- Brothers: Ari Parata; Mikaere Parata
- Wife: Felicity Newman (2023–2024)
- Sons: Archie
- Nephews: Nikau Parata
- First cousins: Kiri; Kahu Parata

Tane Parata is a fictional character from the Australian television soap opera Home and Away, played by Ethan Browne. The character made his first screen appearance during the episode broadcast on 10 February 2020. Tane is Browne's first television acting role after graduating from drama school. The character was introduced as a part of the first Māori family to feature in the show. The family consists of his brother, Ari Parata (Rob Kipa-Williams), his nephew Nikau Parata (Kawakawa Fox-Reo) and his sister-in-law, Gemma Parata (Bree Peters). The family arrive in the town of Summer Bay to begin a new life, despite their tragic past. As the show's first Māori family, the actors involved strived to make them an authentic representation of the culture. Tane is characterised as a "cheeky" and "mischievous" man, he is "family-orientated" but often rebels against his brother, Ari. Writers have developed Tane from being a thief to a more responsible character, making him the owner of the local gym and head of the Parata family. Tane passes on his Māori warrior traditions to Nikau via the Taiaha, a traditional fighting staff. Browne and Fox-Reo thoroughly researched the storyline. Browne continued to praise the show throughout his duration for their commitment to providing an authentic portrayal of Māori culture. Episodes also feature the Te reo Māori language, haka and a Tangihanga for Ari's death.

Tane has been given numerous dramatic storylines in his short tenure; he has survived being nearly beaten to death, poisoned, stalked and two stabbings. He has also been threatened into committing crimes by a drug gang, been held hostage amidst a chemical attack and has even worked with the police to bring down a biker gang. He has romanced both Mackenzie Booth (Emily Weir) and Ziggy Astoni (Sophie Dillman). He has endured a failed wedding and a failed marriage - both via his relationship with Felicity Newman (Jacqui Purvis). Writers developed Tane and Felicity's relationship for nearly three years. They explored their marriage plans and Felicity's reluctance to commit to Tane. They centred the 2022 series finale on their first failed wedding, which was ruined by a car explosion. Their second wedding occurred during Episode 8000 and featured various Māori traditions. Writers portrayed the marriage as problematic due to Felicity's sexual assault and her reluctance to have children with Tane, the latter which caused their final break-up.

In 2024, writers rejuvenated Tane by exploring his need for children. He finds an abandoned baby, Maia, who he attempts to foster. Forbidden from fostering her, Tane steals her from the hospital, which results in him nearly being incarcerated. Writers created a pregnancy storyline with his friend, Harper Matheson (Jessica Redmayne) and explored Tane's mentorship of Perri Hayes (Cantona Stewart), who he becomes a "father figure" to. Tane has been well received by critics of the genre, partly due to his appearance and "bad boy" persona. He has also been praised as a reformed character, due to his journey to becoming head of the Parata family. His relationship with Felicity was favoured by viewers and some critics. Others noted that Tane received a large number of storylines during his tenure and endured many traumas.

== Casting ==
Browne had just completed his studies at the National Institute of Dramatic Art, when he decided to audition for Home and Away. Browne originally auditioned for the role of Tane's brother, Ari Parata, who is played by Rob Kipa-Williams. Browne received a call back from casting directors who asked him to read for part of Tane instead. He described the experience and securing the role as "surreal". Browne's casting and character details were announced on 29 December 2019. Home and Away marked Browne's first television role. He admitted that his family are fans of Home and Away, saying "Grandma Minna is a massive fan and she couldn't believe I got the job." Browne told Ira Heyder of Gisborne Herald that he could not think of a better way to start his television career than playing a Whānau. Ari was introduced first, at the end of 2019. Ari, Tane and their nephew Nikau Parata (Kawakawa Fox-Reo), form the serial's first Māori family. Browne, like the other actors introduced, is New Zealand born with a Māori background. Browne auditioned alongside the actors, who began filming the following week. Browne began filming two months later because writers introduced Tane into the series last. Holly Byrnes of The Daily Telegraph reported that Tane's character brief was "a saucy one, with notes like 'most likely to be drunk and disorderly' and 'most likely to bring home a different partner every week.'" Browne told a reporter from Who that when he watched his debut episodes, he realised how "nervous and unrelaxed" he looked.

== Development ==
=== Characterisation ===
==== Personality and characteristics ====
Tane is cheeky and loves to have fun. He tends to joke around a bit with his family, particularly his older brother. He’s a free spirit and usually rebels against anyone trying to tell him what to do. He may come off as mischievous and at times cocky, but deep down he just wants to take care of his family in his own way.

— Ethan Browne on Tane's characterisation (2020)

Tane is characterised as "cheeky" and a fun-loving guy. Despite having a "mischievous" and "cocky" persona, Tane just wants to take care of his family. Browne described his character as "a mischief maker, the cheeky brother and quite free-spirited." Tane is Ari's youngest brother and a "lovable larrikin". Browne told Tamara Cullen from TV Week that he is "very similar" to Tane; they are both "cheeky" and "family-orientated" but Browne thought Tane was irresponsible. In an interview with Jackie Brygel of New Idea, Browne described Tane as "quite rebellious". He dislikes being told what to do especially by Ari. He added "deep down, he means well. All he wants is the best for his family." He told Kerry Harvey from Stuff that Tane "does all this bad stuff" because he wants to take care of Ari and Gemma. Browne revealed Tane sees Gemma as "more like a mother than a sister" because they are close. Writers placed Tane "about 10 years younger" than Ari and Mikaere, Browne told Johnathon Hughes (Radio Times) that Tane watched his siblings "live a life of crime and Tane naturally followed in their footsteps" and "is making good living out of criminal activity". Tane is sometimes portrayed as impolite and Browne believed he has more respect for others than Tane does. Browne mentioned that he added some of his own "cheekiness" and "sarcasm" into Tane's characterisation. Browne told a Who writer that Tane "does put on a bit of a front" because he feels responsible for his brother, Mikaere's death. He added that Tane wants Ari's approval and that's when writers developed his "more sensitive side".

The actor told Sarah Ellis (Inside Soap) that Tane is a "determined young man" who rebels against Ari, but "really kind and loving deep down." Tane displays the stereotypical "tough guy persona" but he is actually a "very broken" character. When he is introduced, writers played Tane "eyeing up potential girlfriends" which "spiced up" scenes. Tane is also one of the show's "hunky" characters, a trait which requires Browne to film topless scenes showing off his body. He told TV Week's Tamara Cullen that it was easy to film such scenes, despite receiving attention from fans during location filming. He was also content because "if I can justify why I have my shirt off, then it's fine." In another interview via Who, Browne defended his scenes again stating that "it's not like I'm trying to show off my guns - they're just there." Browne included more cardio workouts in his fitness regime because of Tane's numerous shirtless scenes.

When the Paratas are introduced, they are portrayed as "bad boys", with Tane being a thief. Browne revealed that he was concerned the Paratas could play into stereotypes of "the brown person who is the criminal". Writers reassured Browne that this was not their intention and they wanted to portray them changing their trajectory and storylining their journey "changing from the bad guy to the good guy". Writers transformed Tane into a more responsible character by making the head of the Parata family in Ari's absence. Browne called it a new direction for the character. He told Daniel Kilkelly from Digital Spy that Tane is "quietly uncomfortable" but knows it is his duty to be "the pillar for his family". He concluded "I really embraced it. I think it's the natural step for Tane's progression and personal development, and really changes who he is." Browne told Stephen Patterson from Metro that the storyline is "very hard" for Tane, he dislikes being the head but "he must remain strong for the family." He told Stuff's Harvey that Tane "has to man up and become more of a leader in the family."

==== Māori culture ====
The collective form the show's first ever Māori family. Aside from their different accents, writers incorporated the difference in their cultural behaviour. Kipa-Williams told Rachel Lucas from What's on TV that "we do things slightly differently and our humour is slightly different. You’ll notice a bit of a different vibe, which I think is nice. Every family brings a new vibe but we’ll be bringing a piece of culture with us." Browne told Maddison Hockey (TV Week) that "we're bringing a whole new culture to the show - something that hasn't really been seen before on an Australian show." All three actors worked with the script writers to make sure the family were authentic. While interviewed by Harvey, Bree Peters who plays Gemma Parata, stated that the actors fought hard to get a true representation of their culture on-screen. She added that authenticity was important because Māori, Pacific Islanders and other minorities would be able to better identify with the characters. Kipa-Williams revealed that one example of their efforts was adding in Māori words into scenes, which directors approved and included in episodes. Browne told Ira Heyder of Gisborne Herald that they were adding "Kiwi humour people back home will connect with." Browne felt at ease working with fellow Māori actors who originated from New Zealand because they understood each other's humour, which helped the authenticity of the characters. This was important to Browne because he wanted the show's New Zealand audience to view the family as authentic. Browne added that they convinced writers to work their own Māori humour into scripts.

Producers also employed Scotty and Stacey Morrison to work as Te reo Māori language experts and tikanga advisers for the show. Browne told Pierra Willix of the Kalgoorlie Miner that he felt pressured to get the representation of Māori culture correct. Browne revealed Māori pronunciation was an important aspect of the Parata's inclusion on the show. He educated others on-set to say the names correctly. Browne also revealed that other people struggled to pronounce Tane correctly. Another Māori tradition displayed on-screen is Tane removing his shoes before entering houses. Browne said the ritual was done out of respect and he had become accustomed to it growing-up in New Zealand.

In a February 2022 storyline, writers explored further Māori tradition via the Paratas. Tane is portrayed as a supportive figure to Nikau who fears losing Ari, who has been sent to prison. Tane gifts Nikau a Taiaha, which is a traditional Māori fighting staff and begins training him traditional warrior techniques. Fox-Reo explained that the Taiaha sequence reminds Nikau about the "values" that are "very empowering" with this part of their culture. In another interview he noted the Taiaha "is a way for us Māori to reconnect with our ancestors and ground us." Browne had not practised using a Taiaha before and researched techniques by watching YouTube videos and receiving training from Fox-Reo's cousin who is a Taiaha teacher. Browne also connected with the leader of kapa haka group on Facebook and Browne demonstrated his moves over FaceTime and he received feedback. It took them between fifteen and twenty hours of training to learn the movements. Browne told a reporter from Yahoo Australia that "a lot of it we had to do on our own" and it was "very special" to show the "warrior side of the Māori culture." Browne revealed that the storyline received a positive response from Australian viewers. Browne told Kilkelly that he was "blown away by the reaction" and it was "heart-warming" to know the scenes had a "positive effect" on all cultures.

When Ari was killed, writers included a traditional Māori funeral, called a Tangihanga (tangi). A cultural adviser was hired help writers and directors perform a realistic tangi. Browne and Fox-Reo also advised them using their own experiences. Browne offered production one of his dead uncle's songs, which they used in the episode. He recalled that its inclusion was "fitting" and the scenes "felt so real". He also called it a "hard time" because there was "pressure" to make the tangi culturally correct.

=== Introduction and love-triangle ===
Home and Away produced spoiler trailers to promote Tane's arrival in Summer Bay. The Parata family arrive in Summer Bay to start a new life following family tragedy and hide a secret. The Parata family consist of Tane, his brother Ari, his sister-in-law Gemma and her son Nikau. Peters told Brygel that "they've come to the Bay to build a new life, but all they have is each other. They are hiding some pain. Fox-Reo told Bethany Reitsma of The New Zealand Herald that "there's something back home they're trying to get away from and that does lead to some problems." Tane is introduced into the series a couple of weeks after the rest of the Parata family. Browne told Heyder that upon his introduction Tane "is the outcast of the whanau". It soon becomes apparent that he does not have "the most legitimate ways of earning money." His arrival also causes family tensions with Ari who does not want him around. Browne explained that Nikau visits Tane and asks for his help, which forms his introduction story.

His first scenes feature Tane letting Nikau and Bella Nixon (Courtney Miller) crash his party, after they arrive in a stolen car. He lets the pair stay over which leads to unrest with the Paratas. Ari believes that Tane is a bad influence on Nikau and wants him to leave. The pair end up getting into a fist fight over their disagreement. Gemma has to intervene and separate them, Browne told TV Week's Cullen that Ari thinks Tane is a bad influence and has warned him to stay away." Browne told Ellis that understood why Ari was reluctant to have Tane around Nikau. He explained that "Ari knows Tane does dodgy things for a living, because that's what Ari used to do." Ari worries that history will repeat itself and Nikau will copy Tane's behaviour, like Tane did from Ari.

Writers developed a love interest for Tane with restaurateur Mackenzie Booth (Emily Weir). The two characters first encounter each other when Tane is out surfing on the beach. Writers had featured Mackenzie in a romance with Ari, but played Tane unaware of this as they have their first conversation. Browne told a reporter from New Idea that "Mackenzie immediately catches Tane’s eye, there is an instant attraction." Tane is unaware that Mackenzie has been dating Ari and Nikau informs him. Browne said that Tane is not off-put by Ari's involvement and finds it more "interesting" to pursue romance her. He believes that it will annoy Ari, of which Browne commented "he likes to get under Ari’s skin whatever way he can." Mackenzie rebuffs Tane's advances, but his plan to aggravate Ari works and leads to confrontation about his behaviour around Mackenzie. Tane defends himself by suggesting his interest in Mackenzie is genuine.

Tane decides to buy a house in Summer Bay for the Paratas to live in. His family move out of John Palmer (Shane Withington) and Marilyn Chambers' (Emily Symons) house. Browne believed his character wanted to settle down in Summer Bay. Once they settle in, Tane decides to throw a traditional Kiwi hangi party to signify the positive changes he is making in his life. They invite the town's local residents but an accident occurs at the party. John does not trust the Paratas and attends the party to watch over Marilyn. The event is ruined when John collapses with a brain aneurysm.

When Leah Patterson-Baker (Ada Nicodemou) is attacked during a robbery at the Diner, local police officer, Colby Thorne (Tim Franklin) suspects the Paratas were involved. Nikau panics when he thinks he will be arrested for the crime and steals Tori Morgan's (Penny McNamee) car to getaway. He is shocked to discover that Tori's baby, Grace is a passenger and fears he will be arrested for abduction. Tane and Ari decide to help Nikau and cover up his crime. They return Grace anonymously to Tori's home and remove evidence of Nikau stealing her car. Nikau is later taken in for questioning about the robbery and they believe Colby has developed a vendetta against the Paratas. Kipa-Williams told Cullen that Colby believes Tane is the culprit but goes after Nikau. He believed that Colby was jealous because he previously dated Mackenzie. Nikau chooses to remain silent when questioned on his lawyer's advice and is free to leave. Gemma decides to return to New Zealand and grieve Mikaere's death. She convinces her family to join her, to get gain some respite from the police. Colby discovers their plans and orders a block on Tane, Ari and Nikau's passports. At border control, the trio are forced to remain behind and Gemma leaves. Kipa-Williams concluded that it was story with many possible outcomes, which could result in any of the Parata men being jailed.

When they return to Summer Bay, the Paratas decide to farewell and honour Mikaere's memory by performing a traditional haka. The trio go to the local beach and perform the Haka, something which required the actors to portray correctly. Kipa-Williams revealed that the ceremony was difficult to film and required multiple takes to get right. He explained that "it's an act of love and honour in a way only Māori can express themselves." Kipa-Williams branded it a "first" for the show and "not to be missed" scenes. Mackenzie also watches them perform the haka and becomes fixated on watching Tane, despite romancing Ari.

Tane later meets Amber Simmons (Maddy Jevic), who begins flirting with him. Mackenzie becomes jealous and writers heightened their feud during a night out clubbing. Tane joins Mackenzie, Amber and Ziggy Astoni (Sophie Dillman) at the club. Amber continues to flirt with Tane which causes a physical fight between Mackenzie and Amber, resulting in Ziggy being punched in the face. Ziggy has a bruised eye which Ari notices and he tries to find out what happened. Mackenzie and Tane discuss the incident and Ari overhears and demands to know the truth. Ari becomes concerned about his relationship and Mackenzie tells him she wants a serious relationship. She conceals her feelings for Tane. Brown told Cullen that Tane tries not to pursue romance with Mackenzie because "he is trying to turn over a new leaf, but he has many weaknesses - mainly women." Ari decides to commit to his relationship with Mackenzie and takes her on a date. They get along well and they are optimistic about their future, but Mackenzie worries her dalliance with Tane will be revealed. Writers continued to interwind Tane and Mackenzie's stories. Browne was involved in a special location shoot in the Blue Mountains region of New South Wales. The story features Tane, Mackenzie and Ari searching for Nikau and Bella who go on the run from the police.

In September 2020, writers began to explore Tane's criminal past. Tane takes a job working in Mackenzie's, Salt. While on shift, Tane is visited by a group of men, headed by Leon (Will McNeill) who ask him to participate in illegal activity in exchange for money. Tane refuses and tries to throw them out of Salt. Leon retaliates by hitting him with broken glass and injuring him. Mackenzie attempts to call the police but Tane stops her, leaving her worried. Writers fully explored the love-triangle plot between Tane, Mackenzie and Ari in October 2020. Mackenzie moves in with Ari on a temporary basis, but this complicates the situation as Mackenzie realises her feelings for Tane have intensified. Tane struggles with the living arrangements and the tension grows between the trio, with Ari still unaware. Mackenzie hopes that Tane will admit his feelings but is shocked when he gives an ultimatum - either she leaves or he will. Weir told TV Week's Cullen that Mackenzie's attraction to Tane leaves her confused. She added that Tane tells Mackenzie that he is "struggling to be himself around her" and living with her "is too hard" to navigate. Weir stated that it was a "fascinating" and "fun" storyline to portray because love-triangles are "so complex and layered". She concluded that the writers reveal all the "nuances and reasoning" behind Mackenzie's decisions about Tane and Ari. Mackenzie discovers that Ziggy needs a new housemate and decides to move in with her. Ari interrupts her plans by asking Mackenzie to move in permanently. Ari is confused when Mackenzie seems reluctant and she later packs her belongings and goes to Ziggy's home. Ari decides to confront Mackenzie and demands the truth.

=== Return to crime ===
From October 2020, writers began featuring Tane in scenes with Ziggy Astoni more frequently and explored his return to crime. She feels sorry for Tane after she learns about his issues with Mackenzie and him quitting his job at Salt. Ziggy and Mackenzie are close friends but she decides to offer Tane a job at the garage regardless. Tane is not a qualified mechanic so Ziggy is only allowed to let him do menial tasks and admin work. Ziggy's ex-boyfriend, Dean Thompson (Patrick O'Connor) witnesses Tane and Ziggy discussing the job offer over drinks and Amber accuses Ziggy of flaunting her new date to annoy Dean. She is embarrassed by Amber's accusation but Dillman believed there was a connection between Ziggy and Tane. She told Cullen that Ziggy offers Tane a job because "she feels bad for him". Browne acknowledged that there was "chemistry" between the two. Tane feels "at ease" with Ziggy because she is "super-fun and non-judgemental". When Tane begins work at the garage, Ari tries to make amends but Tane accuses him of spying and their sparring continues. Ziggy feels sorry for Tane and gives him further responsibility by allowing him access to the business keys. Tane feels annoyed that he has forgotten "the fun person he used to be". Writers used this event to turn Tane back to his criminal ways. He stores a van of stolen items but Ziggy catches him. Browne reasoned that "to make himself feel in control of his life again, he reverts back to his criminal ways." Ziggy is conflicted whether to report Tane to the police or give him a second chance. When Leon, who stole the items goes missing, Tane leaves to find him. He is gone for days leaving Ziggy to assume he has left Summer Bay. She calls Willow Harris (Sarah Roberts) to help dispose of the stolen goods.

Tane returns to Summer Bay injured after being attacked by Leon and his gang. He is ordered to return the van of stolen goods or face further violence. Tane collapses at Mackenzie's house and she returns the following day to find him unconscious. Tane is taken to hospital where Tori reveals he has sustained severe head injuries and has a torn liver. Tori decides against operating on Tane and opts to wait to see if there is any healing within twenty-four hours. Tane is restless and tries to leave the hospital, needing to contact Ziggy to return the stolen goods to the gang. Nikau visits Tane and is disappointed that his uncle has returned to committing crimes. Tane warns Nikau that the Paratas are no longer safe and must leave Summer Bay. Browne told Cullen that "there's a sense of danger and urgency" to the storyline "but Tane is physically unable to do anything to better the situation."

When Tane is discharged it emerges that the van contained $25,000 worth of illegal drugs. Leon arrives with his gang demanding repayment. Browne revealed that "Tane's life is in real danger". He just wanted to do a quick job and be done, but that doesn't turn out to be the case." Tane asks Ziggy and Willow for help recovering the van. Though Tane does not want to involve Ziggy any further. Browne explained that Tane is "very protective" of Ziggy and does not want her to get hurt. Tane convinces Nikau that he should return to New Zealand but he cannot get Ari away. Tane decides to tell Ari the truth and he agrees to help. Leon and his gang later arrive to confront the Paratas and Ari attempts to reason with them. A fight ensues and Mackenzie calls the police. They arrive and arrest Leon, Ari and Tane. Browne concluded that "Tane didn't foresee things getting so out of hand that the whole family would be in danger, but Leon and his thugs came back to settle the score." After endangering the lives of his family and friends, Browne revealed that Tane feels "emasculated and not himself". Tane agrees to do a final job for Leon to pay off his debts. Mackenzie worries that Leon will continue to harass them and gives her Porche sports car to Leon to settle things. Tane feels guilty that Mackenzie has had to hand over her car.

In February 2021, writers continued to explore the feud with Leon. He and Paul (Jack Finsterer) blackmail Tane and Ari to commit an armed robbery. Producers reintroduced Heath Braxton (Dan Ewing) for the story, who arrives after Dean requests his help. O'Connor revealed that Dean believes the Paratas' plan is wrong and they will get "stitched up", so intervenes.

=== Relationship with Ziggy Astoni ===
Writers played Tane's crime stories as a catalyst for the beginning of a romance with Ziggy. He relies on Ziggy to discuss his guilt about Mackenzie's sacrifice and they bond. Brown explained that Ziggy "feels sorry" for Tane and is the type to "give someone a fair shot without judgement of their past". The duo share an intense moment but pull away before they kiss. Browne stated that the scene conveyed the "chemistry" between the two characters, who "seem to banter very well and have a laugh." Dean gets drunk and tries to reconcile with Ziggy, who rebuffs his advances. Dean goes drink driving and Ziggy feels guilty and enlists Tane's help locating Dean. They find Dean slumped behind the wheel of his car.

Dillman told Cullen that Ziggy had always been portrayed as "a sucker for the underdog" and "wants to see the best in people". Dillman "admired" her character in doing so and agreed that Ziggy's attitude towards Tane follows this mantra. When the police ask Ziggy's business partner, Justin Morgan (James Stewart) to help them with their investigation into a robbery, Tane confesses to him. This puts Ziggy's job at risk and Justin accuses her of having romantic feelings for Tane, which motivated her to help him. Ziggy denies his accusations but realises she is attracted to Tane. Dillman explained that Ziggy "likes Tane as a person, and can see he's been struggling, so she wants to help. But in that friendship she begins to develop feelings for him." Ziggy and Tane get drunk and have sex, which Dillman assessed was her character acting before thinking, plus she was drunk. She added that Ziggy is still unable to figure out her feelings for Tane. Dean attempts to reconcile with Ziggy again, leaving her confused whether to accept Dean's offer or have a "fresh start" with Tane. The show's executive producer Lucy Addario told TV Week's Stephen Downie that "Ziggy wants to put everything behind her - and she really likes Tane - but Dean is very much in love with her." Mackenzie discovers their relationship and is unsupportive and urges Ziggy to inform Dean. When she tries, Dean confesses his love for Ziggy. Writers continued to play Tane feeling secure in his relationship with Ziggy until May 2021. Tane, Ziggy, Dean and Amber attend a surfing competition together and the four celebrate the results. Amber and Tane feel left out of the celebrations and worry their partners still love their exes. Amber was already suspicious when Dean failed to reciprocate her declaration of love. O'Connor added that Dean never got over his break-up with Ziggy. Tane is shocked when he confronts Ziggy about the situation and she cannot reassure him.

The story was further complicated with Mackenzie kissing Tane. He tries to help Mackenzie when she begins binge drinking following her break-up with Ari and ectopic pregnancy. Weir explained that Mackenzie is "seeking validation of being desired" and "seek revenge" on Ari, by seducing his brother. Mackenzie also discards her close friendship with Ziggy because "acts out while drunk". She then tries to convince Tane to have sex with her. In the same week of episodes, writers also portrayed Ziggy and Dean in a separate story, where he tells Ziggy he still loves her. By July, writers continued the break-down of their relationship with Ziggy kissing Dean. Dillman revealed that when Ziggy attends an art exhibition with Dean, they are reminded of their former relationship and Ziggy is still attracted to Dean. Writers then ended Tane and Ziggy's relationship, their break-up occurred after Dean is injured in a car accident. Dillman concluded that Ziggy came to the realisation that she could lose Dean permanently.

=== Felicity Newman and chemical attack ===
Writers quickly developed another love interest for Tane when he meets Felicity Newman (Jacqui Purvis), a new regular character to the show. They used the plot to develop into a mystery chemical attack storyline. Their shared scenes commence when Tane witnesses Ziggy kissing Dean and decides to go clubbing to forget about Ziggy. He meets Felicity, they get drunk together and have sex at her house. Tane is shocked to discover that she is the sister of local policeman, Cash Newman (Nicholas Cartwright). Writers initially portrayed Tane opposed to beginning a new relationship so quickly but continued to feature him and Felicity in numerous scenes. Felicity is portrayed as "fun-loving" and continues to pursue romance. TV Week's Downie reported that "Tane can't say no" to Felicity. Tane visits Felicity and Downie noted that Tane attempts to keep up the pretence until Felicity gives him a "killer kiss". Tane tells Felicity he does not envision a romantic future between them. Tane then receives some roses sent anonymously and assumes Felicity is the sender. Tane confronts her but she denies sending the roses, which causes an argument that Cash intervenes in. Tane later discovers a rose in his gym bag and accuses Felicity, reporting her to Cash who believes there is no evidence of wrongdoing on Felicity's behalf. A mystery character then sneaks into Tane's gym and poisons Tane's drink which causes him to collapse. The character then floods it with poisonous organophosphate gas and locks Tane inside, but the gas leaks into Salt and Cash evacuates the premises. Tane is rescued before medics Logan Bennett (Harley Bonner) and Jasmine Delaney (Sam Frost) try to save his life. At hospital, Logan finds it difficult to resuscitate Tane but is successful. Toxicology tests reveal Tane has been drugged with a sedative. Writers made Cash an unlikely ally for Tane and determined to find his attacker. Cartwright explained that Cash is "worried" and despite Tane's past with Felicity "no one deserves that" treatment. He also revisits Felicity's involvement and Jasmine finds evidence that appears to implicate Felicity in the attack.

Felicity is determined to prove her innocence and her friend, Anne Sherman (Megan Smart) initially provides a false alibi, which she retracts. Detective Darren Nasser (Julian Maroun) takes over the case and investigates Felicity. He then finds further evidence that she was involved. Purvis told Scott Ellis (TV Week) that Felicity is "stressed, isolated and anxious" because no one will believe her innocence. Nikau blames Felicity and begins an online hate campaign against her, resulting in her caravan being graffitied. When the police discover the same drug used on Tane, Cash begins to doubt his sister. Cartwright explained that Cash wants to believe Felicity, but "there are too many red flags for him to back her completely." When Nikau's campaign receives a mention of evidence only select people know about, Felicity suspects the attacker is someone they know. Writers played the story so that viewers were unaware if the mystery character was targeting Tane and Felicity.

Felicity goes missing and Anne is revealed to be the attacker. She kidnaps Felicity and holds her hostage in a shack. Anne then lures Tane to the shack and is unaware that she has drugged him again. She ties Tane up and attempts to carry out another chemical poisoning attack. Cash worries that Felicity is missing and thinks her disappearance confirms her guilt. Cartwright revealed that Cash is "distraught" and wants Felicity to return safe, regardless of her guilt. When Ari realises Tane is missing too, he and Cash set out to find them and locate the shack just as Anne dons a hazmat suit preparing to kill them.

=== Stabbing and biker gang ===
In 2022, after Ari's death, writers continued to explore crime themed stories via Tane, but no longer portrayed him as the perpetrator. In May, Tane is involved in a stabbing storyline following Mackenzie's criminal activities at Salt involving PK (Ryan Johnson). He intervenes in a hostage situation but is stabbed during a fight with Nathan Silva (Ryan Panizza). Weir revealed there is "a terrifying chance Tane could die" but Mackenzie cannot risk exposing her crimes. She instead asks her boyfriend and doctor, Logan Bennett (Harley Bonner) to treat him illegally. Logan assesses Tane and performs an illegal operation on him. Tane's condition detioriates and Logan donates his own blood and gives Tane a blood transfusion, which helps him survive.

In August, Tane was featured in a plot exploring him working with police to bring down a biker gang, The Death Adders. Gang leader Marty (Ben Wood) informs Tane that Ari had stolen money from them and he begins threatening the Paratas. The development featured Tane changing his values and working with the police for the first time. Gang member Tex Wheeler (Lucas Linehan) begins threatening Tane, and orders him to surrender control of his accounts at his gym. Tex intends to use the venue to launder money. Browne told Inside Soap's Ellis that the scenario is "life-threatening" and Tane feels he has no choice to give them control. Tex's girlfriend and police officer, Rose Delaney (Kirsty Marillier) becomes suspicious after witnessing an altercation between Tex and Tane. Browne explained to Cullen that Tane's change in values stem from his need to protect the gym, his livelihood and family. He added that Tex threatens these and he wants to "rip his head off" but needs to "tread carefully". Tane goes under cover and infiltrates the biker gang's headquarters, with the aim of recording a confession about money laundering. Rachel Lucas from Whattowatch.com that another reason for Tane working with the police is that he "has grown up a bit since then and he wants to leave that sort of lifestyle behind him."

Browne stated "the gang have threatened to go for his family" and "he does whatever he can to prevent that". Rose and Cash wait outside while Tane attempts to extort the confession. Browne believed Tane is "freaking out" during the entire sting. Nikau becomes worried for Tane's safety and breaks into the warehouse. Rose also orders a raid of the premises and chaos ensues. Browne described it as "complete chaos" and Tane "goes into survival mode". Linehan added the raid was "fun" to film and revealed production had to create a "controlled environment" to create such chaos on-screen. He added that there were "stunt drivers, weapon armourers, the works!" Browne added that the scenes are high stakes because guns are involved. The raid results in an exchange of gun-fire, with the show teasing that one character would be shot but concealed the victims identity prior to broadcast. Marty is killed and Cash is also shot and hospitalised. Tane and Rose then have to work on convincing the gang that Tane was not involved in the raid and protect him from further harm. Browne concluded that the story would continue with Tane feeling "a lot of pressure to keep up the act."

=== Relationship with Felicity Newman ===
==== Formation and weddings ====
In 2022, writers began exploring Tane and Felicity's relationship and the problems her brother being a police officer has on their dynamic. Ari is arrested for confessing to Matthew Montgomery's (James Sweeny) murder, despite Chloe Anderson (Sam Barrett) being the culprit. Tane decides to distance himself from Felicity to protect Ari, Chloe and her mother Mia Anderson (Anna Samson). Felicity is hurt by Tane's decision but he cannot risk Cash finding out the truth. When Tane sees Felicity working at Salt, their attraction remains. They quickly resume their romance but Felicity begins questioning Tane, putting Ari's secret in jeopardy. Purvis told TV Week's Cullen that "Tane and Flick's relationship is very strong, to be honest, they can't keep their hands off each other!"

In March 2022, writers introduced a story that would affect their relationship permanently which explored Tane's aspirations to have children. Tane grieves the death of Ari but relies on Felicity for support. Purvis told Cullen that Felicity can be her true self around Tane but her honesty jeopardises their relationship. Tane is reflective following Ari's death and he confides his worries about his family. This makes him assess his future goals and he tells Felicity that he wants to buy a house and have children with her. His revelation makes Felicity anxious, which Purvis described as a "massive moment" and shows her "fear of commitment". She added that Felicity's attitude could "ruin" the relationship. She decides to be honest and tells Tane she does not want children and he tells her to leave.

Their romance was developed into a wedding storyline. Tane decides to propose after he and Felicity had faced various dramas. He arranges a date which consists of a picnic at a lighthouse. He arranges for the local band Lyrik to perform an original love song. Felicity does not expect Tane to propose marriage and she is shocked when he does. Purvis told TV Week's Laura Masia that it is a "massive shock" and she is unsure of how to respond. Purvis explained that Felicity loves Tane but she fears losing those she loves and this commitment is "allowing loss to happen". She concluded that Felicity needs to decide that Tane is worth overcoming her fears for. Felicity accepts and Lyrik include the footage in their new music video. Felicity continues to panic about the prospect of marriage and she is hesitant to set a date. Tane watches the footage of his proposal and notices Felicity's hesitation. Browne explained that "he's gutted when he sees that. He thought she was all in, but when he sees that he's kind of heartbroken." Tane decides to call the engagement off, with Browne revealing Tane's takes action "rather than dragging it out and pretending everything is okay." Felicity cannot cope with losing Tane and tries to convince him otherwise.

They eventually reconcile and plan their wedding. Felicity purposely arranges her hen night to coincide with Tane's stag night. Browne revealed that as the wedding approaches, Tane has "residual worry" about Felicity because of her original "tentativeness". Though he assured "Tane has wanted a settled life for so long and he's finally achieving that with Felicity." Purvis stated in an interview with Harvey that "they just kind of complete each other, which is really beautiful." Writers created more drama on her wedding day by portraying Felicity in doubt. TV Week's Ellis reported that Felicity would get "a serious case of cold feet" before the wedding. Purvis explained that Tane "challenges her and her values" and "makes her a better person" but she is still "nervous". Purvis added that Felicity "fear of failure bubbles up again" and "it's all negative" despite her attempts to change her views on the marriage. Purvis told Inside Soap's Ellis that Felicity "thinks she's not good enough and Tane deserves better." Cash reminds Felicity of how much Tane means to her and gifts her their father's old ute. The gift makes her realise that the positives out weight the negatives and she decides to go ahead with the wedding. She travels via the ute, unaware that Tex's associate has sabotaged the vehicle which forms the series finale cliffhanger.

When the show returned in 2023, Felicity and Eden Fowler (Stephanie Panozzo) are involved in a car accident when the ute crashes into Justin and Leah's car. Felicity and Eden remain trapped in the ute and are unable to escape. Tane presumes Felicity has called the wedding off due to her fear of commitment. He is then alerted about the accident and rushes to save Felicity. The car sets on fire, with Tane trying to free Felicity just as it is about to explode. Felicity is pulled from the vehicle but Eden is hospitalised in a coma. The police discover that the brakes were cut on the car. Cash soon realises that Tex and the biker gang are responsible. Tane tries to support Felicity following the crash but she hides her trauma. Browne explained that Tane is in disbelief and "he wants to be strong for Felicity". She is in pain and upset about her wedding being ruined, begins drinking Scotch and pretends to be okay. Tane continued to feature in the biker gang plot, in February Cash becomes determined to get revenge against Tex. He breaks out of prison, holds Cash at gunpoint and Tane saves him. Of Tane's reasons for risking his own life, Browne explained "Tane needs to help out of necessity to save Cash."

Tane soon tries to convince Felicity to plan another wedding. She begins to use alcohol to numb the trauma and Tane becomes concerned. He finds her drunk and creating a noise disturbance in their garden. Felicity retaliates by telling him she no longer wants to get married. Browne revealed that "Tane has become more protective of Flick after the crash, but it may end up dividing them." Writers used Felicity's erratic behaviour to drive the couple further apart and they have a serious argument. Tane reacts badly and begins to take his anger out on John. Tane suggests Felicity gets counselling and she threatens to move out. In another episode, Felicity drunkenly throws her wedding ring at Tane. A Home and Away publicist told Alice Penwill (Inside Soap) that Tane is "absolutely gutted" in the scenes and teased that he may no longer want to marry Felicity. Felicity abruptly flees Summer Bay and upon her return the duo reconcile. Felicity then proposes to Tane which leaves him shocked and unable to think clear. Purvis explained that Felicity finally gains clarity over her father's suicide and gets over her fear of commitment.

They quickly plan their wedding and are soon married. Purvis explained that Tane and Felicity just want a simple wedding and to be married. The wedding featured as the main story during Episode 8000. Writers created a traditional Māori wedding, a kaikaranga is present who calls the wedding and introduces guests. Tane wears a traditional Korowai cloak, which he wraps around Felicity to symbolise him protecting her. Production also included poi dancers. Felicity states her vows in te reo Māori, which Purvis found challenging to recite and hoped she did the "beautiful language justice". Purvis took language classes and Browne also helped her with her pronunciation. Browne told Amy Prebble from Woman's Day that the wedding meant "everything" to him because it allowed him to showcase Māori wedding culture to Australians. He added it was "truly special" and "grateful" for Home and Away for giving his culture a platform. Purvis added that she enjoyed working with Browne creating the wedding and learning about the culture and wedding traditions. When they return from their honeymoon, writers continued to play on Felicity's insecurities about marriage. Purvis revealed that Felicity worries that marriage will alter their relationship. She makes Tane realise she will never be a "traditional wife. Tane is portrayed as reassuring and they move forward as husband and wife.

==== Marriage breakdown ====
In April 2023, producers introduced Tane's cousin, Kahu Parata (Jordi Webber), into the series. Kahu arrives unannounced and wants to move to Summer Bay. He asks Tane for a job at the gym and quickly installs himself as the new personal trainer despite having no qualifications. Kahu's presence also causes issues with Felicity, who is wary of his reasons for staying. Purvis explained that Felicity also wants to enjoy the honeymoon phase with Tane for longer and Kahu's arrival changes things. Webber told Cullen that Tane and Kahu "have always been close, as soon as they catch up again, they click and jive right where they left off." However, once Kahu informs Alf Stewart (Ray Meagher) that he is the permanent personal trainer, Tane begins to worry he has made a mistake hiring family. Tane gives Kahu $1500 to take a TAFE course but he never enrolls. Tane confronts Kahu who reveals he used the money to pursue his dream of owning a fishing boat. Webber revealed that making "responsible" decisions is "foreign" to Kahu. Kahu then reveals he has financial troubles. Tane is shocked when Kahu leaves and hires a boat using the gym's credit card. Tane goes to confront Kahu, who reveals a pattern of debts and irresponsibility he blames on his upbringing. Webber explained that everyone was welcoming to Kahu because "they could see how happy Tane was to have his cousin there." But following his lies "their perception changes" and Felicity is "livid" with Kahu.

Producers created a sexual assault plot for Felicity wear she is drugged and attacked during a night out. The story affects her relationship with Tane. Tane initially blames himself for not being there to stop the attack. He also blames Felicity's friends for allowing her drink to be spiked. Cash vows to find the culprit and Tane struggles to understand Felicity's ordeal. Purvis explained that Felicity's "trauma is so severe" she behaves in ways "Tane doesn't understand". She struggles and does not want him to view her differently and "over-sexualises herself". She concluded "Tane knows it's not what's best for her, so is cautious, but it might push her away." Purvis revealed that writers chose to depict Felicity as over sexualising herself around Tane to show a lesser-known reaction to sexual assaults. Purvis learned that some victims behave this way with their partners during the research process. Their ordeal is worsened by the culprit blackmailing them. They demand $10000 to prevent them posting footage of the attack online. Tane asks Felicity to inform the police but she tries to fulfil the blackmailer's demands. Felicity arranges a trap to catch her attacker and he is arrested, but she does not inform Tane or Cash, which causes problems in their relationship. Purvis noted that Felicity is allowing trauma to impact her relationships "hugely" and "she's creating a lot of distance" with them.

Writers decided to revisit the underlying issues they created in Tane and Felicity's relationship involving commitment. Tane returns from visiting home in New Zealand and asks Felicity to consider moving there with him. She is shocked by Tane's decision and she agrees. Browne told Cullen that both feel they can finally move on after Felicity's assault. He revealed that Tane realises he misses home and envisages himself and Felicity moving their and starting a family together. The show continued to explore the issue of having children. Tane gets drunk and confides to Cash that not having children is preventing him from true happiness. Felicity eventually agrees, Tane is delighted with her change of mind and fails to see her hesitation. Browne explained that "Tane is all for it, and Felicity is hesitant." He added that for Tane, it is "everything he could have asked for. He's just over the moon." Felicity continues to take her contraceptive pills, of which a show publicist warned would end their marriage. They described it as an ironic storyline because Felicity lies to protect her marriage, but the lies would also be its ruin.

When Tane discovers Felicity has continued to take her contraception, he ends their marriage and moves out. He also cancels the land purchase in New Zealand. Felicity becomes determined to reconcile with Tane, who is adamant they are over. Browne revealed "Tane could potentially move back to NZ, but for now, he needs space and time." When the show returned in 2024, writers explored the aftermath of their break-up. Felicity remains determined to reconcile and Purvis revealed that it would take Felicity a long time to accept their marriage is over. She also accepts she is solely to blame for their marriage break-down. Tane tries to move on by kissing his friend, Harper Matheson (Jessica Redmayne). Felicity overhears Harper and Dana Matheson (Ally Harris) discussing the kiss. Tane is shocked when Felicity seems okay with him moving on and they kiss. Purvis noted Felicity still thinks Tane will come back to her and is willing to let him lead her on.

=== Abandoned baby case ===
In February 2024, a new storyline began exploring Tane's need to be a father. He discovers an abandoned baby on the beach and takes her to hospital. Doctor Bree Cameron (Juliet Godwin) gives the baby a medical check and contacts child services to find her parents. Tane does not leave and begins to bond with the baby. Mackenzie and Mali Hudson (Kyle Schilling) become concerned about Tane's behaviour. Browne told Cullen that "Tane is shocked by what he's discovered but his protective instincts kick in and he endeavours to look after the baby until the parents are located." Tane stays with the baby and nicknames her Maia. He shocks Mackenzie and Mali by informing them he plans to apply to foster Maia, should her parents not come forward. Tane told he cannot foster because he is not an Australian citizen. Mackenzie also accuses him of using Maia to fill a void after his failed marriage. Browne revealed that Tane is "doing his best" to move on from Felicity and the "future is looking hopeful". Tane just "wants the best for this baby" and wants to find it a proper home. He concluded that "he can't help but feel responsible for her, as he found her."

Tane continues to visit Maia but the local media interest surrounding the abandoned baby grows. Doctors notice Tane's frequent visits and local gossip questions his intentions. A journalist tricks Dana into giving them information about Tane and they publish a story about his obsession with visiting Maia. Tane is shocked by the newspapers claims and Browne defended his character, noting he just wants to protect Maia. The situation is worsened when Tane is confronted by a journalist and he hits. The journalist then reports Tane to the police, harming his chances of fostering. When Maia becomes sick in hospital, Tane tries to visit her. Doctors and the police prevent Tane from visiting Maia and warn him they will get a restraining order if he does not stay away from her. Browne explained that Tane "believes he's the only one who truly cares for her, and is worried she won't be put into a loving home." He further assessed that Tane is "running on instinct" to "protect" and "provide a loving and stable home" for Maia.

Rose takes an AVO out against Tane and he is shocked when a foster home is found for Maia. Dana agrees to let Tane say good-bye to Maia. Rose is shocked when Tane takes Maia from the hospital and runs away. Browne commented to Ellis (TV Week) that "Tane feels failed by the system, he believes he is doing what's right for Maia, which is all that matters to him." Maia's mother then comes forwards, shocking Rose who cannot locate Tane. After a police manhunt is launched, Tane hands himself into police. Tane realises it would not end well and could now face prison time. Browne revealed "he's facing time in prison for sure" and he feels like he has failed Maia. Dana also upset for allowing Tane access to Maia. Harris told Ellis that Dana feels guilty but she could not have predicted Tane's actions.

To prepare for his court trial, his lawyer, Marshall Aldrych (Nic English) arrives but he does not attend their appointment. Marshall meets Felicity and the pair have sex. Tane discovers the truth, confronts them and misses calls from Rose as part of his bail conditions. Purvis said that Felicity is "embarrassed" and Tane's pride is damaged. Rose arrests Tane which causes issues for their friendship. Marillier revealed her hopes that Tane and Rose would repair their "complicated relationship" which is formed from "friendship and care". Tane stands trial for his actions. Browne described Tane as acceptant that he will go to prison. He added, "he's accepted his fate" and knows "everything doesn't sit in his favour". Marshall comes up with a plan to tell the courts about Tane and Felicity's problematic relationship and how his need for children ruined the marriage. Tane is shocked by Marshall's plans, which help Tane's future. Browne revealed that Tane is not happy with Marshall or Felicity and feels they have pulled a "dirty move" on him. In addition, Tane finds Harper to be his biggest support during the storyline. She offers him "comfort and support" and she helps him cope. He concluded that Tane "leans in towards the friendship."

=== Perri Hayes and Harper Matheson's pregnancy ===
After avoiding a prison sentence, Tane decides to set up a youth offenders rehabilitation programme at the gym. Harper helps Tane launch the programme, where he meets Perri Hayes (Cantona Stewart) and begins to help him change his life. Writers played Tane as a "big brother" and "mentor" figure to towards wayward Perri. Stewart praised Browne and enjoyed working with him on the storyline. Stewart, who is also Māori, had known Browne for years and told Wade Sellers from TV Week that Browne acted like a mentor to him, much like Tane does for Perri. Stewart added that Tane gives Perri martial arts training.

A pregnancy storyline was created for Harper, with Tane being written as the biological father. Redmayne received negative comments from viewers on social media who warned her to stay away from Tane. Digital Spy's Sam Warner reported that the negativity came from fans of Tane and Felicity's relationship. Redmayne stated she was proud of her work and asked viewers to remember that she was just acting out a storyline. On-screen, Harper initially keeps her pregnancy a secret from Tane. Carl engineers a confrontation with Tane and tries to get him to react violently. Harper intervenes and tells Tane about the pregnancy to stop him fighting with Carl over Perri. Tane is initially shocked, gets drunk and later accepts the news. The storyline develops quickly with Tane offering his full support for Harper. She is apprehensive because his first reaction was to get drunk. In later scenes, he reiterates his commitment to Harper and their baby.

Writers portrayed Tane as conflicted in his efforts to support both Perri and Harper. She asks Tane about his intentions and he pledges to support during her entire pregnancy. This causes tension between Tane and Perri. When Tane misses a meeting about Perri's court case against his father, Carl Hayes (Matthew Holmes), Perri feels let down. Tane is again conflicted when Harper is admitted to hospital with bleeding and fears she is losing the baby. Tane chooses to support Harper at hospital and misses Perri's court appearance against Carl. Harper has an ultrasound and they are told the baby is healthy. Rose informs Tane that Carl was found not guilty of abusing Perri and Tane feels guilty for not supporting Perri. Writers began teasing elements of romance between Tane and Harper, starting with an accidental date arranged by Dana.

Carl tries to drown Perri in a swimming pool but he fights back and kills Carl. Perri is charged with murder, despite him acting in self-defence. Ellis from TV Week reported that Tane would continue to support Perri through his ordeal. Tane recalls how his friends helped him through his court case and wants the same for Perri. Tane and Harper support Perri through his court case and a new witness comes forward to save Perri. Stewart told Ellis that "Perri is fortunate to have Tane by his side - he's like an older brother or father figure, he's the only person in his life who demonstrates real love, which is something foreign to him."

== Reception ==
For his portrayal of Tane, Browne was nominated for "Best Daytime Star" at the 2022 Inside Soap Awards. He was nominated for the award again in 2024. In 2025, Browne received a nomination in the "Soaps - Best Actor" category the Digital Spy Reader Awards. Tane fleeing to Western Australia was longlisted for "Best Showstopper" at the 2026 Inside Soap Awards, whilst Browne was longlisted for "Best Actor".

The Paratas gained critical coverage in various sources and praise for showcasing their Māori culture. Bethany Reitsma of The New Zealand Herald stated that New Zealand viewers were excited about a "Kiwi family" joining the show. A writer from TVNZ was "thrilled" with the introduction of the Parata family. They believed that the family would "embody a taste" of New Zealand. Rachel Lucas from What's on TV said that the Parata's introduction "marks a milestone" in Home and Away's history, adding that their Māori culture would "bring something very special" to the show. Nick Everard and Jenny Ky from The Morning Show said that the Parata's arrival "rocked" Home and Away, adding they made "Summer Bay sizzle - and the fans can't get enough." Tahlia Pritchard from Punkee praised the introduction of Tane, adding that he "looks set to make some real waves at Summer Bay." She branded him attractive and that he filled the show's quota of "shirtless, good looking men." Pritchard concluded that Tane and Ari were "reminiscent of the River Boys but, well, sexier and with no shit tattoos." A writer from New Idea branded Tane a "hunky newcomer" who "immediately makes his presence felt" with Mackenzie. Alison Slade from TVTimes branded him Ari's "bad-boy brother". Digital Spy's Louise McCreesh called him a "hunky newcomer" and opined that "things are set to get interesting" because of his romance with Mackenzie. Radio Times' Hughes opined "the Paratas have already made a big impact in Summer Bay" and "tearaway Tane" is the "bad boy brother" who completes the "chaotic clan". New Idea's Chanelle Mansour praised Browne and Fox-Reo for an "incredible representation of the Māori culture on the show". Tamara Cullen writing for TV Week compared the Paratas to the Braxton brothers, three characters who previously appeared in Home and Away. She assessed that like the Braxtons, "the bay's newest trio of bad boys are rebellious, mysterious and, more often than not, shirtless." She added that the Paratas "have brought Kiwi muscle to the bay". Another TV Week writer chose the Paratas' introduction as one of the best Home and Away moments of 2020 and branded them as "mischievous newcomers". They chose the chemical attack on Tane and Salt as one of Home and Away's "biggest moments of 2021".

During his first year on-screen, Browne attracted various critiques for his character including, Kerry Harvey from TV Guide, who wrote that "Tane is a bit of a hot head with an eye for the ladies and a questionable way of making money." Stephanie McKenna writing for The West Australian observed Tane to be more dangerous than the show had billed him as. Her first impression of Tane was that he was more interested in women than making amends with Ari. McKenna later described Tane as having a "fun personality, charming smile and never-ending supply of cash." She opined that the Paratas have an "ominous past" and were "the kind of people that use words like 'loyal' in a Tinder profile." In another review, McKenna branded Tane a "troublemaker" and "bad boy" who constantly shows off his "ripped bod and smooth charm". Jonathon Moran of The Daily Telegraph branded him "Home And Away's new hottie".

Tane's romances have also attracted commentary, with Inside Soap's Penwill, who wanted Tane and Ziggy to become a couple, noting it would be "interesting" to watch "fiery Ziggy with the equally feisty Tane." A New Idea writer assessed that Tane is "the fiery brother" and "bad boy", a role that Browne "made his own" in "no time". They also branded Tane and Ziggy a "sizzling romance". A critic from Woman's Day described Tane and Felicity as bringing the show "alive with love", they called their first wedding "highly anticipated" and "a nail-biting watch". A reporter from 7News named Tane and Felicity as "the bay's hottest couple" and a "star-crossed couple", whose second wedding was "special" and would "go down in Summer Bay history".

Writers giving Tane a disproportionate amount storylines has been noted by critics of the genre. Prebble, from Woman's Day praised Browne's on-screen impact stating, "so far, he has survived being stabbed, poisoned and stalked to become one of the soap's most popular stars. Not bad, considering it's his first major acting role." Lucas (Whattowatch) described him as a "former bad boy" and "normally resilient" character who endured "more than a few terrifying situations" Stuff's Harvey called him a "Summer Bay favourite" who has "faced death more than once and survived being beaten, stabbed, poisoned and has attracted the attentions of a murderous stalker." In 2024, Tahlia Pritchard of Yahoo stated called Tane a show "staple" who "has been through his fair share of triumphs and trauma, as well as being one-half of Summer Bay's once hottest couple Tanicity." Pritchard noted the writers favouritism in gifting Tane stories, adding "this last year alone, Tane has managed to get married, split up with his ex-wife, lose her under tragic circumstances, steal a baby from a hospital, and impregnate Harper. He's been busy!"

Cullen (TV Week) later discussed Tane's character development following Ari's death. She noted Tane had "lost more than most" and "life was tough" for him. She assessed that he did not return to "familiar criminal habits" and "decided to step up, run the family and chase his dreams - including his dream girl, Felicity." Metro's Patterson opined that Tane is a "Summer Bay favourite" who is "certainly proving himself when it comes to stepping up and being there for his family." Patterson assessed that he has "experienced enough heartache to last a lifetime" and questioned how much more the character could endure.
