= List of Home and Away characters introduced in 2022 =

Home and Away is an Australian television soap opera. It was first broadcast on the Seven Network on 17 January 1988. The following is a list of characters that appeared in 2022, by order of first appearance. All characters are introduced by the soap's executive producer, Lucy Addario. The 35th season of Home and Away began airing from 31 January 2022. Xander Delaney was introduced at the end of March, followed shortly after by his sibling Rose Delaney in early April and PK at the end of the month. Lyrik band members Bob Forsyth, Kirby Aramoana, Remi Carter, and Eden Fowler made their debuts in July. Bree Cameron and Heather Frazer arrived in August. Gary Morrow was introduced in October.

== Xander Delaney ==
Xander Delaney
- Home and Away character
- Portrayed by: Luke Van Os
- Duration: 2022–2024
- First appearance: 31 March 2022
- Last appearance: 6 November 2024
- Introduced by: Lucy Addario
In-universe information
- Occupation: Paramedic; Waiter
- Father: Alexander
- Mother: Yvette
- Half-sisters: Jasmine Delaney; Rose Delaney

Xander Delaney, played by Luke Van Os, made his first appearance on 31 March 2022. The casting and character details were announced on 21 October 2021. Van Os is the cousin of former Home and Away actor Chris Hemsworth (Kim Hyde). He sought advice from Hemsworth ahead of a callback for the show, explaining "When I was asked for a callback for the chemistry test, I actually zoomed with Chris the night before and we ran it (the scene) and kind of just got into a good headspace." After winning the role, Van Os relocated to Sydney to be closer to the studios and began filming the same week as his casting announcement. Xander is Van Os's breakthrough role, and he hoped the part would help him to go on to have a long career, like many of the show's former actors. Van Os later teased a connection between Xander and an established character.

Xander was also billed as "a mysterious individual who arrives in the Bay searching for answers". It was later confirmed that Xander is related to Jasmine Delaney (Sam Frost) and fellow newcomer Rose Delaney (Kirsty Marillier). Xander and Rose were not aware of Jasmine until their father died. Van Os explained "Upon the will reading, Xander finds a name he doesn't recognise, Jasmine Delaney. Xander comes to the Bay to figure out who this mystery woman is and at the very least give her the money his father left in the will for her." Jasmine initially refuses to get to know Xander and Rose, believing they are scam artists. She asks her partner Cash Newman (Nicholas Cartwright) to run a background check on the pair, which causes a "disappointed" Xander to suggest that he and Rose leave the Bay.

The character exited the serial during the episode broadcast on 6 November 2024. Viewers speculated that Van Os had left Home and Away after he posted various images of his travels on social media and had not been seen at Palm Beach, the show's exterior filming location. A promotional trailer released the week before also hinted at Xander's departure. On-screen, the character leaves the Bay for Melbourne, where he has a six week internship at a hotel. His final scenes were shared with Rose and his girlfriend Dana Matheson (Ally Harris). Van Os's permanent departure was finally confirmed in February 2025. In scenes airing on 13 February, Xander contacts Rose to tell her that he is staying in Melbourne, having secured a job as an events manager. He then asks Dana via text message to join him in Melbourne as he is not coming back to the Bay.

== Rose Delaney ==
Rose Delaney
- Home and Away character
- Portrayed by: Kirsty Marillier
- Duration: 2022–2025
- First appearance: 4 April 2022
- Last appearance: 19 March 2025
- Introduced by: Lucy Addario
In-universe information
- Occupation: Senior Constable; Detective
- Father: Samuel Edwards
- Mother: Yvette
- Stepfather: Alexander
- Half-brothers: Xander Delaney

Rose Delaney, played by Kirsty Marillier, made her first appearance on 4 April 2022. Marillier's casting and character details were announced on 15 November 2021. Jonathan Moran from The Daily Telegraph reported that she had already filmed her first scenes and had five weeks of filming completed. Marillier previously made a guest appearance in the serial in 2018 as Rhea. She will join the main cast this time around, and she stated: "It is pretty life changing, I am not going to lie. It is really like that big break you crave and wish for as a student and young actor. It really is the break that I always wanted to be a series regular on a show like this, which is so iconic as a part of the Australian canon, and to be acting every day, exercising that muscle, learning on set from everyone around me, it truly is like something I feel so humbled to have been offered."

Further details about Rose's introduction confirmed that she is related to Jasmine Delaney (Sam Frost) and fellow newcomer Xander Delaney (Luke Van Os). On-screen, it is established that Rose and Jasmine are not biologically related, as she and Xander share the same mother, but have different fathers. Rose and Xander come to Summer Bay to honour their father's will and give Jasmine her share of the inheritance. While Rose wants to get it over with, Xander is keen to get to know Jasmine. Rose is a police officer, who develops a crush on her colleague and Jasmine's boyfriend Cash Newman (Nicholas Cartwright). Cash convinces Rose to stay and not abandon Jasmine like their father did. She eventually joins the local police department and works alongside Cash. Producers introduced the character's biological father Samuel Edwards (Bert La Bonté) in August 2023, after Rose decides she wants to know more about her heritage. Daniel Kilkelly of Digital Spy confirmed Marillier's departure on 21 November 2024. He reported that Marillier had filmed her final scenes a few weeks prior and that they would air several months into 2025. The character's exit aired on 19 March 2025, as she left the Bay for a detective job in the city.

== PK ==
PK
- Home and Away character
- Portrayed by: Ryan Johnson
- First appearance: 28 April 2022
- Last appearance: 19 May 2022
- Introduced by: Lucy Addario
In-universe information
- Other names: Peter King
- Occupation: Businessman

Peter "PK" King, played by Ryan Johnson, made his first appearance on 28 April 2022. Johnson previously appeared in Home and Away in 2010 as Paulie Rosetta. He acknowledged his history of having multiple characters on television shows, saying "I did two characters on Rake and two characters on All Saints. This is my second character on Home and Away and it is a lot of fun." PK is a wealthy poker player who buys his way into poker events hosted by Mackenzie Booth (Emily Weir). Johnson described PK as "a bit of a sociopath" and explained "He sees an opportunity to come in and cause some chaos and that's the thrill of it for him. These people are like playthings to him and I think he just goes from place to place and screws people over."

Johnson relished the chance to play a character who was the opposite to the sensitive, moralistic Matt Knight, who he played in Doctor Doctor. He wanted to push himself in his career and found playing a villain was "exciting". Some viewers speculated that PK might be an undercover police officer and was going to bust the illegal gambling nights hosted by Mackenzie, but Johnson told Kerry Harvey of Stuff that while he could not confirm or deny the theory, he did not play the character that way. Harvey pointed out that it was ironic Johnson was playing a gambler, as he was not that kind of risk taker in real life. Johnson admitted that he refuses to do voiceover work for gambling commercials as it can ruin people's lives, and he thought the storyline with PK and Mackenzie showed "how no one ever really wins when it comes to gambling." A whodunnit storyline began on 23 May, after PK's body is discovered on the beach.

Nathan Silva (Ryan Panizza) introduces PK to Mackenzie Booth and he asks to buy into that night's poker game, but she says it is full and he would need to be vetted. Nathan tells her he can vouch for PK, but Mac turns them down. Nathan tries again to convince Mac to let PK into the game and PK tells her to name her price to get him a seat at the table, which she accepts. Felicity Newman (Jacqui Purvis) is suspicious of PK, but Mac insists that he stays as he tripled the buy-in. PK later tells Mac that he wants to run an exclusive poker night at Salt with one table and a $5,000 buy-in. When they discuss the arrangements, PK tells Mac that he does not want Felicity at the event because her brother is a police officer. Felicity confronts PK, telling him that she has been running poker nights for years and that her brother is not an issue, but PK dismisses her. He later sends Nathan to stop her from leaving her house on the night. PK wins big, but he then informs Mac that the House lost and she owes the players $100,000. PK says he has got Mac covered and that they can find a way for her to repay him. He gives her his hotel address and she realises that he wants her to have sex with him. Mac goes to his hotel room, where PK makes advances towards her. They kiss, but Mac soon tells him that she cannot go through with it.

Mac soon learns that PK has scammed her, as the House cannot lose. She later invites PK to Salt, where she pitches him an idea to repay her debt – they will hose another VIP poker night and she will give him the buy-in takings. However, PK says that he will run the night and then demands all of the money made, causing an angered Mac to ask him to leave. He later sends some men to Salt to steal the takings and trash the restaurant. Tane Parata (Ethan Browne) is stabbed during a fight with them. Mac confronts PK and tells him that she knows he conned her and that Tane could have died. Nathan assures her that nobody was meant to get hurt and the men were sent to intimidate her. Dean Thompson (Patrick O'Conner) threatens PK, who retaliates by sending Dean a photo of his young son with a threatening message. Dean attacks PK at the Surf Club and has to be pulled away. He later arranges for the River Boys to kidnap PK. Days later, PK's body is found on the beach and the police conclude that it was dumped there. The coroner reports that PK died from multiple blunt force trauma to the head. All those involved with PK are questioned, and Nathan later retrieves a metal wrench from the bushes and wipes PK's blood off of it. He then tries to frame Dean for PK's murder, but Dean has him kidnapped and then forces him to go to the police, where he confesses to killing PK to protect Mac.

== Bob Forsyth ==
Bob Forsyth, played by Rob Mallet, made his first appearance on 4 July 2022. The character and casting details were announced on 29 June 2022. Bob is one of four characters who make up the fictional band Lyrik, who have been introduced following the departure of four cast members in 2022. Mallet said that joining the cast of Home and Away had been on his "bucket list". He also stated "The whole team there are a pleasure to work with and experts at what they do. It's no wonder the show still has as much support as it does." Sam Warner of Digital Spy reported that Bob has some "big plans" for Lyrik and he is not sure that Summer Bay deserves their music. He is also in a "rocky relationship" with fellow band member Kirby Aramoana (Angelina Thomson). Mallet later said that his character "wants it all; fame, glory, and artistic integrity." Bob departs two weeks after Lyrik's introduction, having grown tired of playing pub gigs in small towns. He tries to persuade Kirby to form a band with him, before quitting Lyrik and driving out of the Bay.

== Kirby Aramoana ==
Kirby Aramoana
- Home and Away character
- Portrayed by: Angelina Thomson
- Duration: 2022–2025
- First appearance: 4 July 2022
- Last appearance: 3 July 2025
- Introduced by: Lucy Addario
In-universe information
- Occupation: Musician; Waitress; Surfing instructor

Kirby Aramoana, played by Angelina Thomson, made her first appearance on 4 July 2022. The character and casting details were announced on 29 June 2022. Kirby is one of four characters who make up the fictional band Lyrik, who have been introduced following the departure of four cast members in 2022. Thomson said the actors who make up the band had formed a close bond as they all joined the show together. She found that her background in music helped her to portray Kirby. Thomson compared her character to the ocean, saying she is "wild, passionate, playful, creative, effervescent and simultaneously calm and loving." Kirby is initially in a "rocky relationship" with fellow band member Bob Forsyth (Rob Mallet).

After Bob leaves the band, Lyrik find a new lead singer in Theo Poulos (Matt Evans). Thomson described the search as "stressful" for Lyrik's remaining members, but said they were "taken aback" when Theo turned up. Theo also becomes a love interest for Kirby, after the pair spend the night bonding and writing together. Thomson commented: "Kirby and Theo's mutual passion for music is a deep connection." After they write a new song, Theo and Kirby celebrate with a hug, which soon leads to them kissing.

The character departed on 3 July 2025. Thomson had been photographed filming her final scenes in January 2025 and she joined a stage production of Guys & Dolls at the Sydney Opera House in March. Thomson's co-star Stephanie Panozzo, who plays Kirby's friend and fellow band member Eden Fowler, paid tribute to her following the broadcast of Kirby's exit scenes, writing "Eden and Kirby will forever live in my heart and I truly believe that this friendship transcended on screens because it was [our] love, joy and happiness behind it. Love you forever. Go shine bright beauty, the world is so damn lucky to witness your magnificence."

== Remi Carter ==
Remi Carter, played by Adam Rowland, made his first appearance on 4 July 2022. The character and casting details were announced on 29 June 2022. Remi is one of four characters who make up the fictional band Lyrik, who have been introduced following the departure of four cast members in 2022. Rowland was working in a bar when he learned he had been cast as Remi. He explained "I was pouring pints when my phone rang with the news. Needless to say I needed a pint or two myself after that phone call. I was excited and slightly daunted by the fact that my life was about to change." Three days later, Rowland relocated to Sydney where the show is filmed. He called his character "the quintessential Australian larrikin", and said Remi "enjoys a good time and stirring the pot but is loyal to his friends and family." Remi is best friends with fellow band member Eden Fowler (Stephanie Panozzo) and they enjoy teasing each other.

== Eden Fowler ==
Eden Fowler, played by Stephanie Panozzo, made her first appearance on 4 July 2022. The character and casting details were announced on 29 June 2022. Eden is one of four characters who make up the fictional band Lyrik, who have been introduced following the departure of four cast members in 2022. Panozzo was unable to attend her audition for the role in person after she contracted COVID-19, so she had to audition over a Zoom call with the casting producers. Of her casting, she said "My agents FaceTimed me, which they never do, and they said I booked the role. I was absolutely blown away and beyond excited. It was a very surreal and incredible feeling." Panozzo grew up watching the show and said her casting "feels like a dream come true." She described her character as "a wild child, full of fire and fun. She is fiercely loyal, speaks her mind and her greatest loves are music and her friends and family." Eden is best friends with fellow band member Remi Carter (Adam Rowland) and they like to tease each other. Writers established a connection between Eden and Cash Newman (Nicholas Cartwright), as it emerges that they dated before their arrivals in Summer Bay. In 2023, producers introduced the character's brother Levi Fowler (Tristan Gorey). It emerges that the pair have been estranged for some time, as Eden believes that Levi took their father's side when their parents divorced, and abandoned the family.

== Bree Cameron ==
Bree Cameron, played by Juliet Godwin, made her first appearance on 9 August 2022. Godwin was pictured filming her first scenes at Palm Beach in March 2022. The character and Godwin's casting was officially confirmed on 19 July 2022. Godwin admitted that winning a role on Home and Away was "a dream come true". She told Stephanie McKenna of PerthNow: The fact that I'm able to wake up and go to set every day and do what I love is such a gift. I'm really grateful for this opportunity. Everyone there is so lovely. I get to work with really talented actors, and it's always a fun vibe." She learned she had secured the role of Bree while she was in her bedroom putting on a face mask for a night in, adding "My agent called me and I literally did a happy dance." Bree is Summer Bay's newest doctor, who takes over running the local hospital's emergency department, following the departure of Logan Bennett (Harley Bonner). Godwin said her character is "ready for a fresh start" and finds the Bay to be the perfect place to do that. Justin Harp of Digital Spy said Bree was billed as "laid-back, kind and caring", but she is hiding something beneath her "bubbly demeanour". Godwin also described her as having a "heart of gold" and being "a surfer chick". As Bree settles into the Bay, her past and secrets are slowly revealed to the other residents. The character's first episode saw her treating Constable Cash Newman (Nicholas Cartwright) after he was shot while on duty.

== Heather Frazer ==
Heather Frazer
- Home and Away character
- Portrayed by: Sofia Nolan
- First appearance: 24 August 2022
- Last appearance: 6 October 2022
- Introduced by: Lucy Addario
In-universe information
- Father: Timothy Frazer
- Mother: Marilyn Chambers
- Half-brothers: Byron Fisher

Heather Frazer, played by Sofia Nolan, made her first appearance on 24 August 2022. Nolan's agent secured the audition for her and she found the character brief "enticing", as she learned of Heather's "vivacious nature" and her storyline. She was informed that she had been cast two weeks after the audition. Nolan told Tamara Cullen of TV Week that it was "a wonderful surprise." Heather comes to Summer Bay to get help from Roo Stewart (Georgie Parker) with a law school application, but causes suspicion when she takes a photo of Marilyn Chambers (Emily Symons). Nolan described Heather as being "a force to be reckoned with". She thought that because of Heather's "unfortunate" upbringing, her confidence and spirit was "admirable." Nolan added "She has a passion for family law, and wants to help others who have experienced that struggle." It later emerges that Heather is Marilyn's daughter, and that Marilyn gave her up for adoption.

Heather meets with her new tutor Roo Stewart at the Pier Diner to work on a TAFE application form. She tells Roo that she wants to study law in order to help those who normally would not have the means, like mothers who have been separated from their children. Heather then explains that while she worked as a housekeeper, she had an affair with a married man and became pregnant. The couple she worked for then took the baby to raise as their own. Roo says she knows what it is like to lose contact with a child. Heather reacts when she hears Roo call out to Marilyn Chambers, and she later takes a photo of Marilyn on her phone.

Later, Heather kidnaps Marilyn, Alf, Leah, Irene, and Roo and holds them hostage in her former boarding school. There, she forces Marilyn to admit to the others that Heather is her daughter who she gave up for adoption, after an affair with a man she worked for. Heather reveals her plan to get revenge on Marilyn for doing so, as her parents turned out to be less than caring towards her. However, Constables Cash Newman (Nicholas Cartwright) and Rose Delaney (Kirsty Marillier) arrive, having discovered that Heather killed an innocent person, her stepmother, exposing her to be an insane, ruthless killer. Heather grabs Marilyn and forces her up to the roof, where she is confronted by Cash. He tries to talk her down, but Heather refuses and pulls Marilyn up onto the ledge of a balcony and attempts to reach an open window to escape, but the masonry crumbles and Heather falls to the floor below, seriously injuring herself. As a handcuffed Heather recovers at the hospital, Marilyn apologises to Heather for being the reason she is in so much pain, but, knowing that Heather is about to face imprisonment for her crimes, tells her that she cannot give her the help she needs or be part of her life, severing ties with her once more. As Marilyn leaves, Heather attempts to claim that her friends know the truth and will never look at her the same way again, but immediately breaks down in tears, forced to face the consequences for her actions and the fact that Marilyn will never see her again. Heather's words are destroyed when Marilyn's friends immediately forgive her and accept her back, and Marilyn later receives word that Heather is unfit to stand trial for her crimes and is committed to a psychiatric hospital.

== Gary Morrow ==
Gary Morrow
- Home and Away character
- Portrayed by: Peter Phelps
- First appearance: 31 October 2022
- Introduced by: Lucy Addario
In-universe information
- Wife: Katherine

Gary Morrow, played by Peter Phelps, made his first appearance on 31 October 2022. Phelps previously appeared in the guest role of Alan Henderson in 2012, and has also directed a number of episodes for the show. Phelps said he "loved returning to a crew and cast, some of whom I've worked with over my 42 years [in TV]." Gary was introduced as Cash Newman (Nicholas Cartwright) and Felicity Newman's (Jacqui Purvis) foster father, who comes to Summer Bay ahead of Felicity's wedding to Tane Parata (Ethan Browne). Cash is delighted to see Gary and urges Felicity to reconnect with him. Purvis said Felicity and Gary have "a rocky history" and she feels immense guilt over how she treated him when she was younger. She explained "Gary came into her life after her dad died, which was confronting for her. Naturally, she rebelled and treated Gary badly. Now, she's guilt-ridden and doesn't want to see him." Gary is "understanding" and sees through Felicity's façade when they meet. He pulls her in for a hug and they reconcile. Phelps reprised the role on 22 August 2024, following Felicity's death. Tahlia Pritchard of Yahoo! Lifestyle later reported that viewers had "fallen in love" with the character and wanted him to join the main cast. She praised Gary for being "an all-round good dude and calm presence in the Bay" and "the only one speaking any sense right now." After telling Cash to grow up and face his former fiancée Eden Fowler (Stephanie Panozzo), Pritchard exclaimed "We love a supportive king!" Pritchard also reported that Phelps appeared to be filming scenes in August, which aired in January 2025. Phelps reprised the role again in late 2026, as Gary returns to support Cash and Eden, who is seriously ill.

Gary and his wife Katherine fostered Cash and Felicity Newman when they were younger. He turns up unexpectedly at their house, despite having arranged to meet Cash at the Surf Club. Cash tries to get Gary to leave, and he quickly realises that Felicity does not know that he is coming. Cash takes Gary to the Pier Diner and explains that his visit will be a good chance for him and Felicity to talk, as she has changed. Gary tells Cash that if he can arrange it, he will talk with Felicity if she has moved past her anger towards him. Cash is showing Gary around the house when Felicity returns home. She reacts badly upon seeing him, so Gary leaves the house and meets her fiancé Tane Parata on the street. Gary is understanding of the situation and he hopes Felicity will come around. It soon emerges that Felicity refused to accept Gary and Katherine as parental figures, following the death of her father, and she left home as soon as she was old enough. Felicity feels guilty for how she treated Gary and after talking, they form a close bond. Felicity later visits Gary after she struggles to cope in the aftermath of a car crash she was involved in on the way to her wedding. The following year, Cash calls Gary to let him know that Felicity has died. Cash chooses to hold the funeral in their home town and bury Felicity next to her parents. Gary is one of only a handful of people Cash wants at the service. Gary meets Cash's fiancée Eden Fowler and provides her with support when Cash suddenly ends their relationship in order to protect himself from being hurt again. Gary tries to talk to Cash round, but Cash ignores his advice.

Some time later, John Palmer (Shane Withington) contacts Gary to let him know that Cash needs support, after becoming the prime suspect in an assault. Gary returns to the Bay and admonishes Cash for not asking for help. He also points out that Cash seems to have given up on clearing his name, which Cash does not appreciate. After Cash and Eden reconcile, they get engaged at Gary's farm. Cash helps Gary out when he is injured, and Gary later attends Cash and Eden's wedding. The following year, Cash returns to the Bay after learning that Eden has aplastic anemia, and that Cash is struggling to cope with her deteriorating condition and the death of a friend with the same condition. Gary asks Cash why he is not at the hospital with Eden, before getting him to take a shower and figuring out what to do next. Gary tells Cash that Eden just needs him to be with her, especially in her final days. Gary goes to the hospital with Cash, and he rebukes Remi Carter (Adam Rowland) for being angry at Cash's absence, telling him that Eden and Cash have family around them now. Gary returns to Cash's house and meets David Langham (Jeremy Lindsay Taylor), who comes to call on Cash. They meet again at the Diner and David introduces Gary to his partner Amelia Carlisle (Nicole da Silva). Gary admits to Amelia that he did not know how sick Eden really was until he saw her.

== Others ==
Date(s)	Character	Actor	Circumstances
3 February–1 March	Neve Spicer	Sophie Bloom	Logan Bennett's former girlfriend, who contacts him suddenly after going AWOL from the army two years ago. Neve explains that when they landed in Germany, she knew that she could not go back to Afghanistan and deal with more injured soldiers. Logan tells her that he thought she was dead and asks whether the military police know she is back in the country. Neve says that she has been laying low in Europe and has new identity papers, as she is facing court martial. Having only just found out that he left the army, Neve says she has come to Summer Bay for him. Logan tells her that he left because everyone was questioning him about her disappearance. The pair share a kiss on the pier, but Logan pulls away and tells Neve that she cannot expect to pick up their relationship. Logan asks Neve to wait in his apartment, but she follows him to Salt, where he introduces her to Mackenzie Booth. Her brother Dean Thompson reveals that Mac is Logan's girlfriend and Neve leaves. Logan catches up to her and she tells him that she has spent all her time trying to get back to him, but he has a girlfriend and should leave. Logan asks if she is getting any help for PTSD and threatens to call the defence force if she goes. Neve apologises to Mac for kissing Logan and Mac invites her to stay at their apartment. Neve's PTSD is triggered when she watches Logan check over an injured surfer, and she recalls a time when she had to help Logan after his convoy was attacked. Logan tries to help Neve, while she and Mac form a truce as Neve expresses her gratitude for Mac keeping her secret. When Bella Nixon surprises Neve and Logan by taking their photo, a scared Neve tries to seize the camera and accidentally hits Logan. Neve later overhears Mac asking whether she is dangerous and eventually gets fed up of Logan trying to treat her. While confronting him about his feelings for her, Neve is spooked by a backfiring car and tackles Logan to the ground. Mac realises she cannot handle Neve any more and gives Logan an ultimatum, which causes him to move himself and Neve to a motel. Dean punches Logan for hurting Mac and while Neve treats him, she kisses him just as Mac walks in. Neve overhears Mac saying that she called the army, so she flees. She experiences another PTSD episode and tackles Mac onto a pool table. Neve finally accepts that she needs help and Logan contact a military psychologist, who tells him that Neve is potentially facing a seven year prison sentence. Neve feels betrayed by Logan, but he tells her that either she gives herself up or he will report her. Neve refuses to turn herself in, until Mac confronts her and says that if she loves Logan, she will not force him to do it. Logan and Mac support Neve as the military police take her away.
7 February	Surfer Pete	Jamai Evans	A surfer pulled from the sea by lifeguards after being hit in the head by a board. Logan Bennett comes over to check Pete and advises that they take him to the surf club to dress the wound.
23 February–7 March	Brett Maloney	Aaron Glenane	Karen Thompson's partner, who is invited to Summer Bay by her son Dean Thompson, so they can talk about why she turned down his marriage proposal. Karen says their relationship is over and kisses John Palmer to show that she has moved on, but Brett does not believe her. He tells Karen that he loves her and knows that she feels the same way, so she should call him when she is ready. Days later, Dean invites Brett to his home for dinner with him, Ziggy Astoni and Karen, who picks a fight with him and returns the engagement ring, causing Brett to leave. Brett returns the following day after Karen calls him, but they struggle to talk to one another about their feelings. Dean tells Brett that now is the time to speak up, but Brett admits to being nervous. He explains that Karen bolted with his car when he proposed. He knows about her mental health issues and that he is just as scared as she is, but if she meets him halfway he will give her his heart and sole. Dean eventually gets fed up and tells them to sort things out, as they both love each other. Karen and Brett make up and he gives her back the engagement ring. They later tell Ziggy and Dean that they have decided to live together and are leaving that afternoon.
1 March	Shayla	Uncredited	Theo Poulos meets Shayla when he turns up for community service and she recognises that it is his first time. She asks him what he got done for and he tells her he stole John Palmer's Surf Club car, which she respects.
7 March	Julia	Ana Maria Belo	A celebrant who marries Ari Parata and Mia Anderson at the hospital, shortly before Ari's condition deteriorates. She later asks his family to tell Mia to call her, so she can get the paperwork done to finalise the marriage. Tane Parata asks her to wait until they know what is happening.
10 March	Wiremu	Peter Paki	Friends and family of the Paratas, who gather at their house to honour Ari Parata before his funeral. They perform songs and a haka in his memory.
10 March	Kai Karanga	Michelle Morunga	Friends and family of the Paratas, who gather at their house to honour Ari Parata before his funeral. They perform songs and a haka in his memory.
10 March	Parata Whānau	Te Tuhi Tipena, Marcus Barber, Kane Pahau, Mark Takuira, Rewi Pakinga, Rinnarta Bryan, Kaitlan Mauriohooho	Friends and family of the Paratas, who gather at their house to honour Ari Parata before his funeral. They perform songs and a haka in his memory.
5 April	Debt Collector Martin	Oliver Cooney	A debt collector who calls at Mackenzie Booth's home, but learns from Logan Bennett that she is out. Martin tells Logan that Mackenzie has 24 hours to call him. Logan later settles the debt.
5 April	Delivery Person	Martin Cohen	The delivery man hands Mackenzie Booth a parcel and asks her to sign for it.
5 April	Callum Pierce	Tristan McKinnon	A man who comes into the Pier Diner and waits for Marilyn Chambers to open the till, before stealing some money. He runs off pursued by Rose Delaney, who stops him from getting into his car and performs a citizen's arrest. The police turn up shortly after and Cash Newman retrieves the stolen money from Callum's pocket. At the station, Callum complains that Rose did not read him his rights and accuses her of hurting his arm, but she tells him to shut up and Cash asks his partner to process him.
5 April	Diner Mary	Celeste Healey	A Diner customer, who is paying Marilyn Chambers for her meal when Callum Pierce steals from the till.
5 April	Police Officer	Gary Bell	Cash Newman's partner, who helps him arrest Callum Pierce and puts him in their car.
7 April–2 June	Nathan Silva	Ryan Panizza	A poker player, who turns up at the Surf Club and asks for Salt. Mackenzie Booth directs him upstairs, where an illegal gambling event is taking place. He loses his first game to Tane Parata, and is consoled by his friend Felicity Newman. During the next game, Nathan tells Tane that the table is waiting on him, as he and Felicity flirt. At the end of the night, Felicity thanks Nathan for coming and he shakes Tane's hand, before leaving. Nathan attends the next event at Salt and gives Ziggy Astoni a tip when she brings him a drink. He is glad to see Tane arrive and introduces him to his friend Jack. After the game, Felicity praises Nathan, who remarks that he was doing well until Tane put him out of the game, but Jack got Tane for him in the end.
17 April–24 May	Jesse	Nat Jobe	A hospital transplant coordinator, who meets with Martha Stewart and her daughter Roo Stewart to discuss their kidney transplant and donation. He tells Martha that they need to check her heart function again and repeat some other tests. Roo assures him that Martha has the fight in her now. Jesse says he will call with the test results and later informs Martha that her surgery is scheduled for the following week.
20 April	High Roller Jack	Barry Conrad	A poker player, who attends an illegal gambling night at Salt with his friend Nathan Silva. Nathan introduces him to Tane Parata and warns him Tane is a shark. Jack tips Ziggy Astoni when she brings him a drink and says she might be his lucky charm for the night. Tane goes all in with a flush, but Jack reveals that he has a full house, winning the game. Jack later asks Ziggy to have a drink with him, but she objects to him touching her. As he and Nathan are leaving, Jack asks Felicity Newman when the next game is and she says she will text him.
4 May–1 June	Millie	Zara Zoe	A woman involved in a car accident with Logan Bennett. Jasmine Delaney and Xander Delaney come across the scene and Xander attends to Millie. She tells him that she has pain in her chest and then suddenly remembers that her friend Jo went to get help. Xander looks for Jo and later tells Millie that Jo is being looked after. He performs a decompression to release a build up of air in her chest, and Millie is eventually freed from the car and taken to hospital. Logan ends up treating Millie when she is brought in. When she asks about Jo, Xander tells her that Jo died and she realises that he lied to her earlier. Logan comes to check on Millie and she learns he was the other driver. Neither of them recall how the accident happened. Millie reacts badly when Xander appears and blames him for not saving Jo. Jasmine later tells Millie that Jo was already dead when she and Xander turned up. Xander visits Millie the following day and she apologises to him. He then asks her to tell him about Jo.
10 May	Barry	Trent Johansen	A man hired by PK to help Nathan Silva keep Felicity Newman away from a poker game at Salt. Barry stops Felicity from leaving the house.
10 May	Dougie	Sam Alhaje	A gambler who attends an exclusive poker night at Salt. He goes all in, but PK wins with a straight.
9 June–10 August	Tex Wheeler	Lucas Linehan	A handyman, who answers Irene Roberts' advert asking for help. She introduces him to Marilyn Chambers, who is currently running Alf Stewart's businesses. Tex tells Irene that he is a carpenter by trade, but he has been between jobs for a while and decided to go travelling. Marilyn tells him that she has received approval from Alf about his employment. She then gives him her notes and expresses her gratitude for his help.
15 June–13 July	Naomi Stevens	Jamaica Vaughan	A tourist, whose sister goes missing in the sea while swimming. Naomi is comforted by John Palmer and she tells him that Goldie got dumped by a wave and was last seen out the back. She watches on as Nikau Parata and Mitch rescue Goldie. They bring her back to the shore, where Nikau resuscitates her. Naomi thanks Nikau with a hug and goes to the hospital with her sister. She returns the following day to collect their belongings and invites Nikau to lunch to say thanks.
15 June	Mitch	Uncredited	A surf lifesaver, who helps Nikau Parata launch the rescue boat and takes him out to search for Goldie. He helps Nikau get her onto the beach, where she is resuscitated.
15 June	Goldie	Uncredited	Naomi Stevens' sister, who goes missing during a swim in the sea. She is rescued by Nikau Parata, who resuscitates her on the beach when he finds she is not breathing. Naomi accompanies her to the hospital.
23 June	Surf Lifesaver Flemo	Alex Rowe	A surf lifesaver, who helps Tex Wheeler rescue an injured surfer. He stabilises the patient's neck, until Nikau Parata and John Palmer arrive to treat him. Flemo then calls for an ambulance.
21 July 2022, 9 January 2023, 11 April 2024	Kiri	David Wikaira-Paul	Tane Parata and Nikau Parata's cousin. Tane contacts Kiri and asks him to come to Summer Bay and escort Chloe Anderson to the airport. Kiri assures Tane and Nikau that he does not need an explanation and will get it done. Kiri returns to the Bay for Tane and Felicity Newman's wedding, and he helps dig the pit for the hāngī. In 2024, Tane hides out at Kiri's house when he goes on the run after taking baby Poppy Rickard from Northern Districts hospital. After Kiri sees Tane on the news wanted by the police, Tane tells him to leave so he is not implicated too. As Kiri leaves, Tane's friends Mali Hudson and Harper Matheson arrive to convince him to return Poppy to her mother, Sonia, which he does.
8 August–	Constable Joanna Devlin	Ariadne Sgouros	A police constable at the Yabbie Creek station. After Cash Newman brings in his sister Felicity Newman for assaulting him, Devlin asks him for his ETA, as he wanted at an undercover sting operation, and he tells her he is on his way now. He then asks Devlin to take care of Felicity. She asks Felicity if she can get her anything and then tells her to sit tight when Felicity starts questioning her about what is going on. Dean Thompson arrives at the station and he and Devlin recognise each other from Mangrove River. He asks to see Felicity and she gives him five minutes, as long as he goes away after. Dean returns with some food for Felicity and Devlin quips that she hates him when he insists on giving the box to Felicity. Devlin later brings Felicity a coffee and Felicity begs her to tell her something. Devlin lets her out a few minutes later after learning Cash has been shot. When her colleague Rose Delaney returns to the station, Devlin asks her if she is doing alright. A few weeks later, Devlin greets Cash when he returns to the station for the first time since he was shot.
12 September	Tully Dixon	Josh Virgona	A music journalist, who interviews Lyrik band members Kirby Aramoana and Theo Poulos. They tell Tully about the other band members, but he soon learns that Kirby and Theo are a couple and asks about their story. Remi Carter and Eden Fowler finally turn up just as Tully is leaving. Tully's article focuses on Kirby and Theo's romance, and calls Remi and Eden their back up musicians.
15 September 2022–26 January 2023	Stacey Collingwood	Maleeka Gasbarri	A nurse, who flirts with Remi Carter as he is being discharged from the hospital. Remi later brings her back to his house, where they spend the night together.
3 October 2022–12 January 2023	Jacob Cameron	Alex Williams	Bree Cameron's husband, who surprises her by turning up early in Summer Bay. He finds Bree talking with Remi Carter and comments that it looked like a date, but she assures him that they just ran into each other. She also tells Jacob to call the hospital to confirm that she was working the previous night. Xander Delaney greets Bree and she has to tell Jacob that they work together. At their motel, the couple admit that they missed each other. Bree says that if she knew Jacob was coming earlier, she would have planned things better, causing him to accuse her of being off with her boyfriend. Jacob sees a text from Remi on Bree's phone and grabs her, while asking her to tell him again that nothing is going on between them.
