= List of Home and Away characters introduced in 2026 =

Home and Away is an Australian television soap opera, which was first broadcast on the Seven Network on 17 January 1988. The following is a list of characters that appear in 2026, by order of first appearance. All characters are introduced by the soap's executive producer, Lucy Addario. The 39th season of Home and Away began airing from 19 January 2026. Police constable Richie Brezniak made his debut in April. Doctor Amelia Carlisle was introduced in June, and Dylan Baldwin arrived in October.

== Richie Brezniak ==
Richie Brezniak
- Home and Away character
- Portrayed by: Rocco Forrester-Sach
- Duration: 2026–present
- First appearance: 28 April 2026
- Introduced by: Lucy Addario
In-universe information
- Occupation: Probationary constable

Richard 'Richie' Brezniak, played by Rocco Forrester-Sach, made his first appearance on 28 April 2026. The character and Forrester-Sach's casting details were confirmed via a promotional trailer for the serial, which was released on 21 April 2026. The actor had begun filming for the serial earlier in the year. Forrester-Sach left his home in Ulladulla aged 16 in order to pursue his acting career in Sydney, with the goal of appearing on Home and Away. He commented "I remember I said to myself, that was one of my goals and now eight years later, it has come to fruition." He admitted that he came close to giving up acting and becoming a firefighter until he received the audition for Home and Away. Forrester-Sach later commented on how much he enjoys shooting scenes on Palm Beach, the show's exterior filming location, saying "After we wrap (shooting), I can go straight into the water for a swim — it's one of the greatest things about the job." Forrester-Sach's online CV later confirmed that he had been promoted to the main cast, and he returned in late September 2026.

Richie is a rookie police officer, who starts work at the Yabbie Creek police station alongside Senior Constable Cash Newman (Nicholas Cartwright). He was billed as being enthusiastic, which will "test" Cash's patience. Richie is also a new love interest for Abigail Fowler (Hailey Pinto). Forrester-Sach did not initially give away his character's storylines, but said he "sparks up a bit of a romance, maybe causes a bit of drama." Forrester-Sach relished playing a police officer, but did not think he could be in the police in real life. A promotional trailer for Home and Away later revealed that the character would be at the centre of one of the show's "biggest emerging storylines", as he shoots someone while on duty. The storyline initially begins with Richie investigating a "spate of crimes" around the Bay. Forrester-Sach explained "He's super enthusiastic, and as the crime wave escalates, Richie's passion and need to solve the case — and his need to prove himself — comes through. He's following a lead when things take a turn for the worst, and things go down and down from there." He also said that Richie is "mortified and shocked" after shooting someone, and he becomes aware that he may not be able to make things right no matter how hard he tries.

The shooting victim is Sergeant David Langham (Jeremy Lindsay Taylor). In the aftermath, Richie is let go from the police force and he struggles to find further employment, as he has no reference, which is something David would be responsible for. Despite breaking up with Abigail, she continues to try and help him. Forrester-Sach commented "Abby is a kind-hearted person and was willing to stick by his side. This kills Richie as he sees how much it's hurting her to do so. He needs to screw his head back on, get his priorities straight and figure out the sort of man he wants to be." The character makes a temporary departure, after Cash tells him some "hard-hitting truths" about his career prospects. Forrester-Sach said that in order for Richie and Abigail to get back together, his character would have to do "some thinking and reflecting" on why things went wrong. Divya Soni of Digital Spy confirmed that Richie returns to the Bay in order to continue his relationship with Abigail. He also reveals that he is struggling to find work.

== Amelia Carlisle ==
Amelia Carlisle
- Home and Away character
- Portrayed by: Nicole da Silva
- Duration: 2026–present
- First appearance: 11 June 2026
- Introduced by: Lucy Addario
In-universe information
- Occupation: Doctor

Amelia Carlisle, played by Nicole da Silva, made her first appearance on 11 June 2026. Da Silva's casting and character details were announced on 12 April 2026. Da Silva began filming for the serial in January, and while her casting was initially kept a secret, fans of the show spotted her on set and rumours of her joining the cast were posted online. She had previously made a guest appearance in the show as a character named Jane in 2006, but revealed that she had joined the cast on "a more permanent basis" this time around. Of her casting, da Silva commented: "The Home and Away team have been so welcoming. I look forward to audiences meeting Amelia in the coming months." She told Siobhan Duck of The Daily Telegraph that it had been "a real privilege" to join the show and that the timing had been "really right" for her, pointing out that it is one of a handful of productions filming in Sydney, where she is based. Da Silva later said that the role meant she could stay close to her family, community and the production company she runs with Danielle Cormack, which was "important" to her.

Amelia will be introduced as Summer Bay's new doctor, following the departure of Bree Cameron (Juliet Godwin) in late 2025. Da Silva had to learn a lot of medical terminology for the role, which she said was "very intimidating". She was able to bring her experience of playing an paramedic in All Saints and a tactical response police officer on Rush to the role. She explained: "There is crossover in how people in those locations tend to operate. So I have brought some of that experience to Amelia." Da Silva also carried out her own research, talked to her doctor friends and with the medical team for the show, as she wanted to make sure her portrayal was as authentic as possible. Da Silva did not reveal what storylines her character would be involved in, but she said that her first scene would be on the beach with Ray Meagher, who plays Alf Stewart, which she described as "a real pinch-me moment." She was not allowed to reveal which other characters she would be closely interacting with, joking that it was "all a bit secret-squirrels", but she thought the viewers would enjoy who Amelia crosses paths with. Further details about the character were revealed shortly before her debut. Amelia's first episode sees her treat one of the show's regulars who has been shot. Da Silva also revealed that there would be "romance down the track" for Amelia, which she described as "a lovely storyline to play out".

== Dylan Baldwin ==
Dylan Baldwin, played by Noah D'Annunzio, made his first appearance on 12 October 2026. D'Annunzio was revealed to be joining the cast after he was spotted at Palm Beach, the show's outdoor filming location, in July 2026. His character was confirmed to be the brother of Sonny Baldwin (Ryan Bown) and a new love interest for Lacey Miller (Sophea Pennington) Tamara Cullen of TV Week reported that Dylan makes an unannounced arrival in Summer Bay, as he seeks out his brother. She thought that for Sonny, Dylan's arrival "could be just the fresh start he needs", following a steroid addiction and broken engagement. In later scenes, Dylan tells Sonny that he no longer wants to be the "golden boy" and is seeking adventure. He later becomes defensive when Sonny asks why he is really in town. Cullen also reported that Lacey is one of the first characters Dylan meets and there is an instant attraction between the pair, however, Lacey is still grieving the death of her former boyfriend Theo Poulos (Matt Evans).

== Others ==
Date(s)	Character	Actor	Circumstances
19–20 January	Rescue Leader Alison	Lulu Howes	A police rescue officer who takes charge of the scene of a train crash. She asks Holden Dwyer how many people are trapped in the wreckage. She later greets David Langham and Cash Newman and tells them the tunnel has partially collapsed. She tells Tane Parata and Levi Fowler that they cannot go in, as it is too dangerous. After gaining access to the train, Alison helps guide survivors out. She tells Lacey Miller and Eddie Shepherd to go, but they refuse to leave a trapped Jo Langham. Alison helps Justin Morgan off the train, before discovering Levi and Tane have arrived. She works on stabilising the carriage in the tunnel and freeing Sonny Baldwin and Jo. She refuses to let Levi go back in after the tunnel starts to collapse.
19–20 January	Paramedic Peter Cooper	Kurt Ramjan	The paramedic finds and treats an injured Holden Dwyer following the train crash. He later tells David Langham that Justin Morgan has internal bleeding and is being taken to Northern Districts Hospital. Peter also oversees Sonny Baldwin's transfer to the ambulance and allows Remi Carter to get in the ambulance with him. He stays to treat casualties at the scene.
19–20 January	Dr Martin Chappel	Anthony Harkin	Dr Chappel prepares the emergency department for an influx of patients from the train crash. He tells Levi Fowler what has happened and to expect multiple casualties. Leah Patterson asks Dr Chappel about her husband Justin Morgan and he tells her to ask one of the nurses, shortly before Justin is brought in. He learns Justin has internal bleeding and informs surgery he is on his way. Dr Chappel treats Sonny Baldwin, who is unable to feel his legs after being trapped under a chair, and tells him that he may be suffering from minor shock syndrome. He then tells Dana Matheson to get Sonny moved, as he is stable and they have a critical patient coming in. Dana argues with Dr Chappel about Sonny's treatment and he stands her down from her duties. He later informs Sonny that his x-rays are clear and they can remove his neck brace. He says they will monitor the swelling to see if things improve. Dr Chappel also tells Mackenzie Booth that her tests are all clear, but he wants to keep her in because she is pregnant.
19 January	Paramedic Pete's Partner	Josh Anderson	Peter's partner brings Justin Morgan to the Northern Districts Hospital and tells Dr Chappel that Justin has suffered blunt force trauma, resulting in internal bleeding. He later brings in Sonny Baldwin and tells Dr Chappel that his lower limbs were confined by a chair, but there are no obvious fractures.
20 January	Nurse Joseph	Gabriel Fancourt	Nurse Joseph informs Dr Chappel that a critical patient is being brought in.
21 January	Lifeguard	Christian Foggiatto	Alf Stewart comes across the lifeguard attempting to wake an unconscious Remi Carter near the Caravan Park. The lifeguard tells Alf that a surfer found Remi and that an ambulance is on the way.
21 January	Paramedic	Kate Bookallil	The paramedic brings Remi Carter to the hospital, and tells Levi Fowler that he was found unconscious and unresponsive, before having a seizure on route.
22 January	Nurse Jacqui	Meagan Caratti	Nurse Jacqui carries out Sonny Baldwin's neuro assessment, telling him that they will start with a sensitivity test. Sonny is unable to feel anything.
2 February	Physiotherapist Lisa	Patricia Pemberton	The physiotherapist brings a wheelchair to Sonny Baldwin and asks whether he has used one before. She then shows him how to get into it from his bed, but Sonny tells her he cannot do it and refuses to try again. Lisa tells him that she will see him later. Their afternoon session goes better, with Sonny able to get in and out of the wheelchair with John Palmer's encouragement.
9–12 February	Louis	Adam Bowes	Louis meets Sonny Baldwin and Dana Matheson as they arrive at the North Coastal Spinal Rehab Clinic. He tells Sonny that he is organising wheelie races that afternoon and asks if he wants to join, before Warren interrupts. When Sonny later enters the rec room, Louis tries to teach him how to pick something up off the ground, but Sonny gives up straight away and says he hates the wheelchair. Louis tells him he hated his at first too, but it gives him freedom. He then points out that there is a chance Sonny will walk again, but Sonny says that there has not been any improvement. Louis then tells him about all the plans he made with his girlfriend until she left him after he lost his legs. He points out that Sonny has hope and a chance. When Louis mentions to Sonny that he saw Dana at the centre, Sonny tells him that he ended their relationship. Louis tells him he will regret that. Sonny tries to leave, but bumps into a table and falls out of his chair, so Louis goes to get help. When Sonny returns from the hospital, Louis meets his friend Remi Carter and tries to get them involved in a basketball game. They later hang out together in the rec room and Remi tells Louis that he wants to stay in touch with him.
9–12 February	Warren	Alfie Gledhill	A North Coastal Spinal Rehab Clinic physio. He sends Louis on his way, before greeting Sonny Baldwin and Dana Matheson. He tells Sonny that he is in charge of his rehab plan and that Sonny should try getting around on his own as he will be there for a while. Warren later finds the pair in the garden and tells Dana that she needs to leave if she wants to help and that he will look after Sonny. Warren continues to show Sonny around and takes over pushing him, as Sonny is tired. He shows Sonny to his room, where Sonny finally snaps at Warren out of frustration, but soon apologises. Warren watches on as Louis tries to help Sonny and later greets Dana, after Sonny calls her, telling her that he has had a bit of a baptism by fire. After they work on strengthening Sonny's upper body, Warren notices Sonny that skipped lunch and brings him a sandwich. He tells Sonny to let him know when he is done wallowing. Sonny later argues with Warren about visiting Dana on his behalf. After Sonny falls out of his wheelchair, Warren and his colleagues help him back into it and Warren accompanies him to the hospital. Warren introduces himself to Sonny's friend Remi Carter when he comes to check on him. Back at the rehab centre, Warren talks with Remi about what Sonny needs going forward.
12 February	Oncology Nurse	Marie Chanel	The nurse books Remi Carter into the system and tells him and Eden Fowler that it could be a bit of a wait before he is called in. When Remi is called through, the nurse shows him the mask that will protect and help keep him still during treatment for his brain tumour, before fitting it over Remi's head.
16 February–18 March	Constable Stillon	Adrian Espulso	The constable tells Sergeant David Langham about Cash Newman letting Tane Parata's friends visit him in his cell. The following month, Cash asks Stillon where David is and Stillon tells him that David is in court all day.
18 February–24 March	Constable Erikson	Tristan Black	Constable Erikson hands Sergeant David Langham a copy of Tane Parata's phone records, and say that he looked through them as requested and found a couple of numbers that popped up again and again in the days leading up to his arrest. David tells him that one of the numbers belongs to his daughter, but to look up the other. Erikson later comes to Tane's house and finds Cash Newman there. He tells him that David has requested Tane come in to answer some questions, but Cash says they are going to call Tane's solicitor first and will come to the station later. Days later, Erikson lets Cash know that Tane is twenty minutes late for his bail check in, and Cash assures him that Tane probably got caught up with his son. When Cash returns to the station, Erikson says that Tane still has not appeared and Cash tells him he will handle it. David order a trace on Cash's phone, but Erikson informs him that the tech team need a warrant as they do not have legitimate cause. He also points out that Cash has taken leave and David dismisses him.
26 February–	Paramedic Caitlin	Lucy Green	The paramedic asks Cash Newman, Remi Carter, and Sonny Baldwin what is going on and Sonny tells her and her partner that Remi had a seizure. Caitlin asks to check Remi over, but he refuses and she asks him to sign a waiver, before leaving. Caitlin brings in Tane Parata after he is attacked in prison. She tells Levi Fowler that he was found unconscious, with obvious contusions to his abdomen. He is also hypertensive and tachycardic.
26 February–19 March	Dr Cindy Swan	Brigid Zengeni	A neurosurgeon and Levi Fowler's friend. He asks her to meet Remi Carter, who has a brain tumour that is not responding to radiation therapy. Remi apologises for running away and Levi puts it down to stress. Dr Swan tells Remi that he has one of the most aggressive brain tumours she has ever seen and his treatment options are limited. Dr Swan explains that surgery is the only option as the tumour is growing too fast, but it is also complex due to its position. She recommends awake surgery – operating on Remi while he is conscious – in order for her to monitor his cognitive and motor functions. When Dr Swan learns Remi plays the guitar, she tells him to bring it with him while she is operating. Remi quickly leaves and Dr Swan tells Levi that he is panicking. She also admonishes him for devoting so much time to one patient. Dr Swan returns in the morning and Remi agrees to the surgery, but when Dr Swan talks him through what she will be doing, he panics. Dr Swan tells him there is a 10% mortality rate with the surgery, but it will be 100% without. Levi asks Dr Swan to put him on the surgical team as Remi's anxiety could be a problem during the surgery and he can keep him calm. Dr Swan meets with her surgical team and tells Levi that he needs to keep Remi calm during surgery, as well as informing her about any neurological changes. She then admits that Remi's surgery will be one of the most challenging procedures she has ever attempted. Remi struggles to remain calm and play the guitar during the surgery, until Dr Swan warns him that she will put him under full anaesthesia. She is able to successfully extract the tumour. She later diagnoses Remi with expressive aphasia when he cannot remember certain words and assures him that it will get better over time. Dr Swan stops by to say goodbye to Remi, who thanks her for helping him. But she later agrees to take a look at Sonny Baldwin, who is using a wheelchair and believes he felt movement in his foot. Dr Swan explains that his swelling has gone down and his spinal injury is incomplete. She asks him to come to her clinic, but Sonny refuses and leaves the room. His girlfriend Dana Matheson clarifies with Dr Swan that she is not ruling out complete recovery, before Dr Swan says she cannot help Sonny if he does not want it. Dana brings Dr Swan to see Sonny at home and she invites him to her city clinic for a more thorough assessment, which he agrees to.
2 March	Tradesperson	Craig Alexander	A tradie that John Palmer hires to finish his bathroom renovation. John is happy with the estimated cost, but points out that the quoted price for the fittings are pricey and the tradie recommends going with a matte black to lower it.
3–4 March	Uncle Fred Byen	Matt Boesenberg	A drug dealer, who Harper Matheson recalls from her childhood, as he sold drugs to her mother Kerrie Matheson. Cash Newman tracks Fred down and, after confirming that he is the dealer who sold drugs to a man who overdosed, brings him to the station for questioning. Fred refuses a lawyer and tries to cut a deal in exchange for information. He then reveals that his supplier is Tane Parata. While Cash and David Langham are outside the room, Fred calls Kerrie and threatens her if the story backfires on him.
5 March	Female Delivery Person	Rhianna McCourt	The delivery person comes to Lacey Miller's motel room to hand her a bento box meal.
9–23 March	Terry	John Walton	One of Darryl Braxton's farm hands. Brax asks Terry to look after his son Casey Braxton while he talks with Ricky Sharpe. Days later, Brax tells Terry that he is on castration duty after he turns up late.
9 March	Police Officer #1	Garry Bell	David Langham tells the first officer to put the disorderly man into the cells and charge him, after he punches another officer. David tells the second officer to take his injured colleague to the hospital to get checked out. He then explains that he is finished for the day and should not be called unless it is an emergency.
9 March	Police Officer #2	Andrew Powell	David Langham tells the first officer to put the disorderly man into the cells and charge him, after he punches another officer. David tells the second officer to take his injured colleague to the hospital to get checked out. He then explains that he is finished for the day and should not be called unless it is an emergency.
9 March	Disorderly Civilian	Michael Matera	David Langham tells the first officer to put the disorderly man into the cells and charge him, after he punches another officer. David tells the second officer to take his injured colleague to the hospital to get checked out. He then explains that he is finished for the day and should not be called unless it is an emergency.
10 March	River Boy Clappa	Ryan Enniss	Clappa is tasked with helping Tane Parata to flee Summer Bay. He remarks that someone has gone to a lot of effort to help him out. He hands over Tane's new identity, a plane ticket, and a burner phone. He smashes Tane's phone and tells him that he will be given instructions for pick up upon landing. Clappa then explains how they will remove his ankle monitor and plug it into the power, which will show Tane at home and give him a head start.
12–16 March	Anaesthesiologist	Sam O'Sullivan	The anaesthesiologist reassures Remi Carter that there is nothing to worry about while administering the anaesthesia, so Dr Swan can open up his skull, before waking him for the removal of his brain tumour. The anaesthesiologist notices that Remi's blood pressure is rising, but after Levi Fowler calms Remi down, he tells Dr Swan that he is happy to keep going. After the tumour is removed, the anaesthesiologist tells Remi that that it is the same routine as before, so Dr Swan can close the skull.
19 March, 25 May	Sonographer Magda	Deepka Ratra	Magda meets Mackenzie Booth for her 12-week scan, but Mack tries to delay it as her partner Levi Fowler is not there. Just as they are starting, Levi arrives. Magda informs them that everything is as it should be. A couple of months later, during another scan, Magda steps out to fetch Dr Sinclair who tells Mack and Levi that they cannot find a heartbeat.
24 March	Coral Bay Local	Alesha Pemberton	Jo Langham approaches the local woman and asks if she has seen the man in the photo on her phone, but the woman says no and tells Jo to enjoy her trip.
25 March	Matthew Filmore	Gerard Carroll	The prosecutor comes to the police station to interview Lacey Miller about the death of Holden Dwyer, but Sergeant David Langham asks to speak with him first. Matthew tells David that he cannot talk to him about the case, as David is Lacey's father, but David asks him how he reached his decision. Matthew explains that the recent press coverage had nothing to do with it, the DPP wanted to send a strong message about people taking justice into their own hands, and that they do not do favours for daughters of officers. David raises the issue of women being failed by the system, but Matthew tells him not to take things so personally. David then threatens to quit the force and go to the press about the broken system. Matthew meets with Lacey and tells her that after review, he and the DPP have concluded that there is little chance of securing a conviction and she is free to go.
7–20 April	Peterson	Cameron Jones	The prison officer notices new inmate Tane Parata standing alone watching the other prisoners and asks him if he is looking at a long stint. After Tane tells him that it could be 15 years, Peterson advises him to get involved in some of the programs as prison is lonely. Peterson later supervises Tane as he makes his first call home. He also lets Mackenzie Booth out of the visitors yard when she admits that she is experiencing morning sickness. Peterson congratulates Tane, but Tane tells him that the other woman is his partner. He tells Tane that it is tough being a parent inside and assures him that it will get easier. Days later, Peterson jokes with Tane that the other guards are taking bets on how long he will stay stuck to the wall watching the other inmates. Knox enters the yard and comes over to Peterson to tell him that his spell in solitary did not break him. Peterson warns Tane that Knox is bad news. Days later, Knox threatens Peterson's life after he is ordered out of the visiting area. Peterson later overhears that Tane is getting out and tells him to keep the news to himself. He is later cornered by Knox and some of the other inmates, who then attack him. Tane tries to help despite Peterson telling him to walk away. The other guards get Peterson out.
7 April	Prisoner	Adam Washbourne	The prisoner cat calls Jo Langham, as she and Mackenzie Booth walk to the visitors yard
9–14 April	Sterlo	Dave Hoey	The new leader of the River Boys surf gang. He comes to Salt to give Mackenzie Booth some information, but attempts to flirt with her first, which she shuts down. Sterlo admits to beating up Fred Byen and Mack asks whether he mentioned the whereabouts of Kerrie Matheson. Sterlo offers Mack the information in return for sexual favours, but they are interrupted by Darryl Braxton, who attacks Sterlo and pushes him down the stairs. He reveals that he is one of the original River Boys and takes the piece of paper, which is revealed to be blank. A few days later, in Mangrove River, Sterlo notices Casey Braxton and asks what he is doing, before Brax appears. Sterlo tells Brax that Mangrove River is not his town anymore. Ricky Sharpe tells him that Sterlo is not worth fighting and they leave. Sterlo remains angry with Brax and brands him "nothing now" after being told that he was once a big deal around Mangrove River. Brax returns to confront Sterlo about the River Boys lack of respect towards the locals and women. Brax tells him that if he keeps on with it, he and Sterlo are going to have a problem. Brax attempts to leave, but Sterlo shouts out that his wife and child need to watch their backs, provoking Brax into returning to fight. However, Sterlo punches him first and they start fighting. Ricky and Casey's arrival halts the fight, just as Brax is about to punch Sterlo again.
13–20 April	Knox	James O'Connell	A Graydon Prison inmate, who returns from solitary confinement and is greeted by some of the other prisoners. He comes over to Officer Peterson and gloats that solitary did not break him, before Peterson tells him to move on. He destroys a game of chess between two inmates and then notices Tane Parata watching on. He comes over and asks Tane what he did, before wishing him luck getting out again. He advises Tane to watch Peterson and to be careful which side he chooses. He later kicks Tane's stool during visiting. Days later, Knox berates his brother Woody during visiting, so Woody tells him he is done and goes to leave. Peterson orders another guard to get Knox out of there and Knox tells him he is a dead man. He and some of the other inmates later corner Peterson and attack him. Tane attempts to help and pins Knox up against the wall, but he is then attacked with an home-made taser. The other guards break up the fight.
14 April	Spanner	Ben Hunter	A River Boy. When Sterlo complains about Darryl Braxton being in Mangrove River, Spanner mentions how Brax was a big deal around there back in the day.
20 April	Woody	Daniel O'Leary	Woody visits his brother Knox at Graydon Prison, but Knox berates him for always messing up and calls him a waste of space. Woody tells him he is leaving.
20 April	Prison Guard	Liam Soden	Tane Parata asks the guard if he can make a phone call as it is his son's birthday, but the guard says to leave it with him and he will see what he can do. He later helps break up an attack on Peterson.
22 April	IT Officer Ripley	Clare Fotinos	An officer from the police tech team, who helps to trace Kerrie Matheson after she contacts Harper Matheson. Ripley explains that Kerrie is using a burner phone and tells Harper to keep her talking, so she can locate her.
27 April	Surf Student Lily	Georgia McGinness	One of Mali Hudson's surf students. She flirts with him while telling him that she has been practicing. At the end of the lesson, Lily asks for Mali's help in getting out of her wetsuit and asks if he saw her moves. She then asks if they can go for a drink or a juice to talk about surfing, which Mali accepts. Lily meets Mali in the Surf Club and he buys her a coffee. He closes his business for the day and they decide to go out to dinner at Reefton Lakes.
19–20 May	Carmen	Cassandra Magrath	Justin Morgan is called out to fix Carmen's ute, as it will not start. Justin notices a broken side mirror, which Carmen attributes to a hit-and-run in a parking lot. Justin tells her that the job will take a while, so Carmen goes off to call her boss to tell them she will be late. Justin fixes the engine problem and tells Carmen that he just needs to check her tyre pressure when Sergeant David Langham arrives. David asks Carmen about her side mirror and she realises Justin called the police. She gives the same excuse she gave Justin, but David asks her to come down to the station to answer some questions about a recent accident. David asks Carmen if she was driving on a certain road in Reefton Lakes the previous week and Carmen admits that she was. David explains that a young woman was hit by a car on the side of the road and Carmen's ute matches the description. Carmen becomes upset and admits that she thought she clipped a car, as she was distracted by the blinking engine warning light. David assures her that the victim is okay and she is later charged.
25–27 May	Dr Ellen Sinclair	Janine Watson	Sonographer Magda calls in Dr Sinclair while carrying out an ultrasound scan for Mackenzie Booth. As Magda performs the scan again, Dr Sinclair tells Mack and Levi Fowler that she cannot find their baby's heartbeat. Levi asks if the placenta is obstructing the heart, while Mack thinks something is wrong with the machine. Dr Sinclair tells them that she will need to carry out a beta-hCG test to confirm a miscarriage. She later tells Mack and Levi that they will get the results within the hour and then they can do through their options. The test confirms Mack has had a miscarriage and Dr Sinclair tells her that she should be induced, or undergo a surgical termination. Mack asks for more time to think, but Dr Sinclair tells her that for her own safety they need to act quickly. After Mack undergoes surgery, Dr Sinclair brings her a post-op care guide and tells her what to expect.
4 June–31 August	Beau Hammond	Blake Richardson	Beau overhears gym owner Tane Parata talking to Sonny Baldwin about his workout. He approaches Sonny outside and tells him that he did well, considering he has an injury. Sonny says that Tane drew up a plan and he is trying to stick to it. Beau explains that he is a "performance enthusiast" and has a few pointers if Sonny wants them. He mentions taking the right supplement to fast track his training, and gives Sonny his phone number. A few days later, Beau meets Sonny at the gym, but before they can talk, Sonny points out Harper Matheson nearby and introduces her. Beau flirts with Harper and Sonny tells her that Beau is a physio, who helped him get off the crutches. Sonny later asks Beau for some more steroids and Beau tells him he can get a weeks worth the following day, but it will cost him. Dana Matheson comes over and introduces herself, before asking Beau to join her and Sonny for a game of pool. He learns that Dana is Harper's sister. Sonny tries to put Beau off from pursuing Harper for a date. The next day, Beau stops by the gym to give Sonny his steroids. Outside, he meets Dana and she asks whether Sonny is going too hard in the gym and Beau offers to keep an eye on him. He also asks after Harper and learns that she has a child. Dana gives him Harper's phone number and they arrange a date, but Sonny tells Harper that Beau has a girlfriend. Beau denies it when confronted by Harper and they go for a drink, where Harper opens up about her rough childhood with drug addicted parents. Sonny admits that he was trying to keep Beau and Harper apart, and tells Beau that he cannot tell anyone how they know each other. Harper and Beau's relationship progresses as they go away for a few days. On their return, Beau confronts Sonny and tells him to relax, but Sonny tells Beau to leave Harper alone, prompting Beau to quit as his dealer.
9 June	Police Officer	Jake Fryer-Hornsby	A constable at Yabbie Creek Station, who attends a meeting about a spate of property and vehicle thefts in the local area held by Sergeant David Langham. While out on patrol, Richie Brezniak spots Justin Morgan's stolen van and the officer tells him to radio it in, while he takes a look. Dale suddenly appears and steals Lacey Miller's bag, before getting into the van and taking off. The officer attends to Lacey, while Richie pursues Dale in the patrol car. At the station, David asks the officer what happened and he explains that he was scouting the area and checking on Lacey when Richie took off.
9–10 June	Dale	David Harsh	A man responsible for a spate of thefts around Summer Bay. He steals Lacey Miller's bag and flees the scene in a stolen van pursued by Richie Brezniak. He returns to his campsite, where the van is later located. Dale sees his girlfriend Alana being questioned by Sergeant David Langham and drops the wood he is carrying and comes towards them with a branch in his hand. He tells David to get away from Alana. Richie warns him to stop and pulls out his gun, but accidentally shoots David.
10 June–	Trainer	Gene Owens	A trainer at Summer Bay Fit. Gym owner Tane Parata watches on as he conducts a training session near the beach. Sonny Baldwin later speaks with the trainer about increasing the weights with his training, but admits that Tane has his program and the trainer goes to check it for him. Sonny notices the trainer holding an outdoor boot camp and he joins in with the group.
10 June	Alana	Sarah Furnari	Dale's girlfriend. Constable Bowman tracks down a stolen van to Alana and Dale's campsite. Sergeant David Langham arrives and Alana tells him that there has been a misunderstanding. She tells him that she bought the van from a man by the side of the road. As she is trying to give a description, Dale appears and yells at David to get away from Alana. The pair are later arrested and taken to Reefton Lakes Station.
11 June	Maya Lewis	Ainslie McGlynn	A representative from the Conduct Commission, who comes to take Richie Brezniak's statement after he shoots Sergeant David Langham. As Richie explains what happened, Maya asks if he thought about using a different piece of defence equipment like, pepper spray, but Richie says he just grabbed his gun. Maya states that training dictates that using a firearm is a last resort and asks if Richie felt like he had exhausted all the other options, but Richie says he thought he was doing the right thing. At the end of the interview, Maya asks for Richie's badge and tells him he is suspended from duties. Outside the room, she tells Cash that Richie is clearly traumatised and she will arrange for him to see a psychiatrist.
24 June	Mabel	Elle Murray (uncredited)	A woman who gets into difficulty in the sea and is rescued by Mali Hudson. Amelia Carlisle takes over her care, while Mali goes to look for a lifeguard.
5 August–5 October	Zane Talbot	Angus McColl	Marilyn Chambers's pen pal, who visits her in Summer Bay after leaving prison.
2 November–	Phillip Osmond	Michael Sheasby	A local man who tells Sergeant David Langham that he saw Roo Stewart talking to a hitchhiker next to her car before she went missing. He gives a description of the man to David, who notices his wedding ring and asks if his wife saw anything. Phillip then tells him that his wife died and they bond over not being ready to take off their rings. He agrees to help the police put together an identikit image of the hitchhiker. Phillip later watches a news report about Roo's disappearance and then goes out to a shed, where he wraps Roo's phone and a bloody hammer in newspaper, before burying them in the forest. Phillip joins in the search for Roo and speaks with her father Alf Stewart. The phone and hammer are soon found by the police. David calls Phillip to the police station to talk more about the hitchhiker and Phillip lets slip that he saw the man get into the back of Roo's car. He expresses his remorse that Roo is still missing, but David reveals that she has been found alive and well. Phillip asks David why Roo is lying about the hitchhiker and David tells him that she has been unable to remember what happened. Phillip tries asking where Roo is, but David tells him that she is safe. Phillip contacts Alf, and posing as a journalist, asks if she can speak with her, but Alf warns him to leave Roo alone. He later meets Alf in the Surf Club and Alf introduces him to Roo, as one of the volunteers from the search party. Roo does not recognise him, but Phillip stays in the area and later sees Roo walking along the beach alone. He approaches her and asks if Roo remembers him, before telling her to drop the act and stop pretending she does not know him. Roo admits that he seems familiar to her, but she does not know why. Phillip grabs her and tries to take her off the beach, which causes Roo to remember that she tried to help Sharna, as she attempted to leave him, before witnessing Phillip kill her. Phillip blames Roo for Sharna's death and attempts to drown her in the water, only for David and Constable Alexa Lombard to arrive and stop him. David tackles Phillip as he runs off and arrests him for the murder of Sharna. After Roo gives her statement, Phillip is interviewed, but he refuses to comment even when David tells him he will also be charged with perverting the course of justice.
3 November–	Courtney Radcliffe	Olivia Sawyer	A woman who finds Mali Hudson on the beach and reminds him that they had a one-night stand after clubbing in Reefton Lakes. She then tells him that she is pregnant and the baby is his. Mali asks if the baby is definitely his and Courtney says that it is, and that she thought he had a right to know. They go to Salt and admit they are both struggling to get their heads around the news. Courtney tells Mali that she wants the baby more than anything in the world and he supports her decision. She gives him time to think about how involved he wants to be and they exchange phone numbers. Mali later invites Courtney back to Salt, and she immediately tells him that she is okay if he does not want to be apart of this if it will blow up his life. Mali stops her and says that he is not letting her do it on her own, and they will work it out. Courtney tells him she knew he was a good man from the moment they met. Mali invites Courtney to move in with him and she attempts to help him several times with his work, but Mali admits that he does not want to complicate things. John Palmer encourages Mali to let Courtney help out at his surf board shop and he finally agrees. He also takes her advice about talking to Tane Parata about his struggles looking after the gym. The pair later share a kiss, but Courtney asks whether they are doing the right thing.
18 November	Marianne Nader	Lucy Rossen	Marianne is asked to come to the Yabbie Creek police station and she asks if she is in trouble, but Sergeant David Langham wants to ask her about her friends Sharna and Phillip Osmond. Marianne suddenly asks if Phillip has done something to Sharna. David asks further questions about the last time Marianne saw Sharna, as well as Phillip's behaviour towards her. Marianne tells him that Phillip had so many rules about who Sharna saw and what she spent, adding that he had a short fuse. She reveals that he once threatened to kill Sharna if she left him. Marianne gives David a photo of Sharna and agrees to return if needed.
