= List of Home and Away characters introduced in 2025 =

Home and Away is an Australian television soap opera, which was first broadcast on the Seven Network on 17 January 1988. The following is a list of characters that appear in 2025, by order of first appearance. All characters are introduced by the soap's executive producer, Lucy Addario. The 38th season of Home and Away began airing from 13 January 2025. Detective Mark Townsend was introduced during the same episode. Eliza Sherwood and Sonny Baldwin made their debuts during February, followed by Lacey Miller in March. Sergeant David Langham arrived in May, and his daughter Jo Langham followed in June, along with Cohen Luther.

== Mark Townsend ==
Mark Townsend
- Home and Away character
- Portrayed by: Craig Hall
- First appearance: 13 January 2025
- Last appearance: 6 February 2025
- Introduced by: Lucy Addario
In-universe information
- Occupation: Detective

Mark Townsend, played by Craig Hall, made his first appearance on 13 January 2025. Hall's casting was confirmed in November 2024, after he was pictured on set. His character is the show's new detective, who investigates the attack on Tim Russell (George Pullar). The prime suspect is Constable Cash Newman (Nicholas Cartwright), who woke up next to an unconscious Tim covered in blood in the 2024 season finale. Susannah Alexander of Digital Spy reported that the episode see Townsend "setting his suspicions on Cash" during his investigation, before arresting him.

Detective Townsend arrives at the Koi Stone River Estate, after receiving a call about two male victims of assault. Cash Newman (Cartwright) identifies himself as a constable and advises Townsend to protect Eden Fowler (Stephanie Panozzo), as she is in danger. Justin Morgan (James Stewart) tells Townsend that he called in the incident and saw Cash leaning over Tim Russell (Pullar), who has suffered a serious head injury. Townsend talks with Eden and Remi Carter (Adam Rowland), who reveals that Cash was not meant to be at the house. Cash explains that he is there because Tim and Eden are in danger from Nerida Mullins (Ellie Gall), Tim's former patient who has made threats against them. Townsend believes Remi is holding something back and advises him to call if he wants to talk further. He then tells Cash that he is a suspect now. He meets with Senior Constable Rose Delaney (Kirsty Mariller) at the police station and she informs him that Cash did not give her a statement, and that he and Tim had had a prior altercation. Townsend speaks with John Palmer (Shane Withington) about a break-in at Eden's house. Remi then comes to Townsend about an argument he saw between Cash and Tim. He says that Cash has a need to protect people, following the death of his sister. Townsend arrests Cash for assault causing grievous bodily harm, and he removes Rose from the case after she lets Eden visit Cash.

== Eliza Sherwood ==
Eliza Sherwood
- Home and Away character
- Portrayed by: Martha Kate Morgan
- First appearance: 13 February 2025
- Last appearance: 1 May 2025
- Introduced by: Lucy Addario

Eliza Sherwood, played by Martha Kate Morgan, made her first appearance on 13 February 2025. Morgan was three years older than her 14 year old character, who is introduced as Roo Stewart's (Georgie Parker) new foster child. Jennie Curtin of the Blue Mountains Gazette stated "Eliza has been in the foster care system for some years and causes Roo a lot of worry." Eliza comes to Roo after a fire burnt down her previous foster home. Parker said Eliza appears to be "distant, shut down and frightened when she first arrives in the Bay. It's hard to get a read on her so it's hard for Roo to support her." During her early scenes, various hints are dropped that Eliza started the fire and in "a dramatic twist", she begins threatening Marilyn Chambers (Emily Symons). Simon Timblick of What's on TV called Eliza "a whole lot of trouble" and found her behaviour "strange and creepy".

A young girl placed with Roo Stewart after her last foster home burns down. Roo introduces her to her father Alf Stewart (Ray Meagher) and Marilyn Chambers (Symons) and explains that she only managed to salvage a music box from the fire. Eliza decides to go to her room rather than eat dinner with everyone. Roo tells her that they will go shopping for clothes and things in the morning and asks if Eliza has anything she wants to talk about. Eliza says the fire was intense and Roo is thankful that her foster siblings got out safely. Eliza later goes through the contents of the music box, revealing a lock of hair, a photograph with faces scratched out, a ring and a lighter. In the morning, Eliza takes money from Marilyn's purse, before she and Roo go shopping. Eliza buys Roo a card, but gets defensive when Roo enquires where the money came from. Roo apologises for jumping to conclusions. Eliza becomes obsessed with surgery after talking to Levi Fowler (Tristan Gorey) and steals a fishing knife. She is also fascinated with a pregnant Harper Matheson (Jessica Redmayne) and touches her bump without asking. Roo homeschools Eliza and enrols her in Tane Parata's (Ethan Browne) youth programme. When she takes a photo of Tane's unborn baby from his bag, one of the other participants Scott (Finnian James) urges her to put it back and Eliza punches him. She later threatens him. Marilyn moves out after feeling uncomfortable around Eliza, who makes threats towards her and steals money from her purse again. Eliza is present when Harper goes into labour. She pretends to call for an ambulance and then films the birth, which she is later caught watching. After she withholds Alf's heart medication, Roo has no choice but to find Eliza a new foster placement. Before leaving, Eliza tells Roo that she is worse than all the other carers she has had. Roo later confirms that Eliza is undergoing a psychiatric evaluation, and that the doctors suspect that she has conduct disorder and psychopathic traits.

== Sonny Baldwin ==
Sonny Baldwin
- Home and Away character
- Portrayed by: Ryan Bown
- Duration: 2025–present
- First appearance: 17 February 2025
- Introduced by: Lucy Addario
In-universe information
- Occupation: Record label promotor Bartender
- Brothers: Dylan Baldwin

Sonny Baldwin, played by Ryan Bown, made his first appearance on 17 February 2025. Bown's casting details were announced on 12 January 2025, along with Sophea Pennington, who was cast as Lacey Miller. Bown auditioned for the role while he was living in London. He completed his final audition over Zoom, shortly before he and his partner moved out of their apartment, as it was being sold. He was told he had won the role two days later, and three days after that he returned to Australia. Of joining the Home and Away cast, Bown stated "It's like one big wacky family, and everyone welcomed me with open arms. I’m super excited to be working on such an iconic show."

Sonny is introduced as a friend of series regular Remi Carter (Adam Rowland). He was billed as being "a 'charming', 'impulsive' and 'fun-loving' party boy", as well as "cheeky and spontaneous". Bown described Sonny as "a more cheeky, outlandish version" of himself, so he knew he could do something with the role. He said Sonny's loyalty would be challenged and his background exposed, which Bown was excited to explore. After Sonny arrives in Summer Bay, he breaks into Remi's home, giving Kirby Aramoana (Angelina Thomson) "the shock of her life." The character's fictional backstory establishes Sonny as a former promotor and mascot for Remi and Kirby's band Lyrik. He left to go travelling and now that he is back, he offers to help Remi spend his new inheritance. Bown told Tamara Cullen of TV Week that his character has "a good heart", but he needs to grow up. He confirmed that viewers would get to see why Sonny came back as his story unfolds. The character's younger brother Dylan Baldwin (Noah D'Annunzio) was introduced in October 2026 amidst a difficult time for Sonny, who is recovering from a steroid addiction.

== Lacey Miller ==
Lacey Miller
- Home and Away character
- Portrayed by: Sophea Pennington
- Duration: 2025–present
- First appearance: 13 March 2025
- Introduced by: Lucy Addario
In-universe information
- Father: David Langham
- Mother: Kristina Langham
- Sisters: Jo Langham

Lacey Miller, played by Sophea Pennington, made her first appearance on 13 March 2025. Pennington's casting details were announced on 12 January 2025, along with Ryan Bown, who was cast as Sonny Baldwin. Pennington told Zara Powell of The Daily Telegraph that joining the cast was both "surreal" and a "pinch me moment", as she had grown up watching the show. She stated "I'm beyond excited, I feel like I've blinked and it truly is a dream come true." Pennington enjoyed shooting her scenes at Palm Beach, the show's exterior filming location and likened the cast to "one big family."

Lacey was initially billed as "the wild child with a heart of gold". Pennington said she and her character shared some similarities, telling Powell: "Lacey is definitely a bad girl, but she has a really good heart. I see a bit of myself in her. It's been a lot of fun to play, though also a bit of a challenge." The character is associated with the serial's River Boys surf gang. Divya Soni of Digital Spy reported that she would "make quite the entrance", while her storyline would be "intriguing". Lacey is introduced as the girlfriend of gang leader Gage Reynolds (Tom Wilson), but she becomes a love interest for Theo Poulos (Matt Evans). The character's father David Langham (Jeremy Lindsay Taylor) was introduced in May, followed by her sister Jo Langham (Maddison Brown). For her portrayal of Lacey, Pennington was nominated in the "Soaps - Best New Casting" category at the 2025 Digital Spy Reader Awards. The following year, she was longlisted for Best Actress at the Inside Soap Awards.

== David Langham ==
David Langham
- Home and Away character
- Portrayed by: Jeremy Lindsay Taylor
- Duration: 2025–present
- First appearance: 28 May 2025
- Introduced by: Lucy Addario
In-universe information
- Occupation: Police sergeant
- Wife: Kristina Langham
- Daughters: Jo Langham; Lacey Miller

David Langham, played by Jeremy Lindsay Taylor, made his first appearance on 28 May 2025. Taylor previously appeared in the recurring role of Detective Dylan Carter in 2016. He joined the main cast in late 2024 and filmed for six months before his casting was announced on 25 May. Of re-joining the serial, Taylor stated "It's been a whirlwind It's very, very exciting. It's been a busy six months, and now (my episodes) are just about to come on air." He admitted that he was enjoying his time with the show and getting to know the rest of the cast, who he praised. He called his first scene with Lynne McGranger (Irene Roberts), Ray Meagher (Alf Stewart) and Ada Nicodemou (Leah Patterson) as "one of those pinch me moments" and said it made him happy.

David is introduced as the new police sergeant at Yabbie Creek station. Taylor said Langham was his favourite police officer he had played throughout his career. He described him as "very by-the-book", while Clare Rigden of PerthNow said viewers could expect "drama, emotion, and a much-needed moral compass." David is also the estranged father of Lacey Miller (Sophea Pennington), who was introduced a couple of months prior and has been "missing" for a number of months. David and his other daughter, Jo Langham (Maddison Brown) arrive in Summer Bay together. Taylor told Rigden that the family are navigating "trauma, and trying to reconnect, but it's not going really well." He added that David is also dealing with his new working relationship with Cash Newman (Nicholas Cartwright), who has had "a shady career." Taylor was longlisted for Best Newcomer at the 2026 Inside Soap Awards.

David introduces himself to his fellow officers, and admonishes Cash Newman for being late, despite Cash's insistence that his shift does not start for another twenty minutes. David asks Cash to wait in an interview room and he goes through his personnel record, pointing out all the times Cash has gone against the rules, his suspension and involving a civilian in an arrest. He comes across the name Lacey Miller in a police report and asks Cash to tell him about her. Cash says that she was in a coercive relationship with a gang leader, and her testimony helped put him away. David tells Cash to bring her to the station, where it emerges that Lacey is his daughter. She makes it clear that she is not happy to see her father, who reveals that he has spent months trying to find her, and she leaves the station. Tane Parata (Ethan Browne) comes to the station to defend Cash and tells David how his involvement in a recent case was all his own doing.

== Jo Langham ==
Jo Langham
- Home and Away character
- Portrayed by: Maddison Brown
- Duration: 2025–present
- First appearance: 9 June 2025
- Introduced by: Lucy Addario
In-universe information
- Father: David Langham
- Mother: Kristina Langham
- Sisters: Lacey Miller

Jo Langham, played by Maddison Brown, made her first appearance on 9 June 2025. The character and Brown's casting was announced on 18 May 2025. Brown secured the role shortly after returning home to Australia from Los Angeles. She commented: "It was everything I'd ever wanted – to be in Sydney and be with my family." Brown described it as a "full circle" moment, as she had wanted to be on Home and Away since she was a child. Brown, who joined the main cast, said she was enjoying playing Jo and filming on-location in Palm Beach, which she called "a pinch-me moment".

Jo was billed as having a "complicated backstory". She also has "family ties in Summer Bay", but should not expect "a happy family reunion" when she arrives in town. Brown commented that her character's family has "a very fractured, complicated relationship. There's a lot of drama to come as the storyline evolves and I'm excited for fans to get to know Jo and her backstory. It's Home And Away, and Summer Bay wouldn't be Summer Bay without high drama and conflict, so it's going to be super exciting." It was later announced that Jo's father David Langham (Jeremy Lindsay Taylor) would be introduced before her, while her sister Lacey Miller (Sophea Pennington) made her debut in March. Jo comes to Summer Bay to see her father, with Brown explaining "David and Jo have a beautiful relationship. He took a stable job in Yabbie Creek and she came to town because she doesn't want him to be alone." She encounters Tane Parata (Ethan Browne) who offers to fix her broken car, but she declines multiple times. Jo also wants to mend the broken relationship with her sister, however, Lacey does not want anything to do with Jo and a fight breaks out between them. Brown said the fight scenes with Pennington were the first she filmed after joining the cast. Both sisters are brought to the station, and David, by Cash Newman (Nicholas Cartwright). While Jo seems upset, Lacey has no regrets. In 2026, Brown was longlisted for Best Newcomer at the Inside Soap Awards.

== Cohen Luther ==
Cohen Luther, played by Nathan Murray, made his first appearance on 18 June 2025, and his last appearance on 2 September, 2025. The character is introduced as Roo Stewart's (Georgie Parker) new foster child. He comes into her care, after his mother Samantha Luther (Heidi May) is arrested. The pair are homeless and have been living in a tent. Murray said Cohen is "very scared" when the police take his mother away, as she is "the only person he has. She was doing everything for him, so he's also worried, confused and angry. He doesn't understand that what she did was wrong – his mum has been protecting Cohen a lot and this has become a normal way of living and getting by." Tamara Cullen of TV Week observed that Cohen is "wary and unsure" about staying with Roo. Murray told her that Cohen does not have a lot of trust because of his mother's arrest. He is also "completely destroyed" when he realises how long he will be separated from his mother for. In 2026, Murray was longlisted for Best Young Performer at the Inside Soap Awards.

== Others ==
Date(s)	Character	Actor	Circumstances
13–14 January	Dr Anita Khurana	Emily Havea	An obstetrics surgeon, who assists Levi Fowler in the removal of a cyst from Harper Matheson's unborn baby. Dr Khurana notices Levi pause and he tells her that he cannot decompress the cyst and must cut it up. As Harper becomes hypertensive and the baby's heartrate increases, Dr Khurana steps in to help. She later warns Levi that if Harper's blood pressure rises, she will deliver the baby and tells Levi to work fast. She later advises Levi to consider removing the baby's lung if he cannot remove the cyst. Levi succeeds and leaves to talk to Harper's relatives, while Dr Khurana closes up. She later visits Harper with Levi.
13–14 January	Anaesthetist Harry	Paul Hughes	Levi Fowler introduces Harper Matheson to Harry, who tells her that he knows her sister Dana Matheson, before he administers the anaesthetic. During the procedure, he informs Levi that Harper's vitals are stable, but the baby's heartrate is elevated, and he advises Levi to hurry up. Harry soon informs Levi that Harper is hypertensive and Dr Anita Khurana steps in to help. Harry praises Levi when he is able to remove the cyst from the baby's lung.
13 January	Paramedic	Mitchell Gilmour	One of the paramedics sent to the Koi Stone River Estate after receiving a call about two assault victims. Bree Cameron tells Dylan that Tim Russell has suffered a head strike leading to an extradural haematoma, which she has drained with a burr hole.
21 January 2025, 19 January–16 March 2026	ICU Nurse Joanne	Sharon Hunt	A nurse at Northern Districts Hospital. The following year, when multiple patients are brought in from a train crash, she apologises to Abigail Fowler for the wait and tells her she will get her some pain relief.
10 February 2025, 22 January 2026	Doctor	Tahnee Stroet	The doctor assesses Eden Fowler as she recovers from a ketamine overdose, and makes her drink some medication to flush her system of toxins. She tells Eden that they will talk about her going home after another set of blood tests. The following year, the doctor takes Jo Langham off a ventilator and warns her family that she will be a little disorientated at first.
5–10 March	Scott	Finnian James	A teenager who introduces himself to Eliza Sherwood as they enrol in Tane Parata's youth programme. He tells Eliza that he took his uncle's car for a joyride, but she is not interested in talking with him. Scott sees Eliza take something from Tane's bag and urges her to put it back, or he will say something. Eliza tells him to shut his mouth. When Scott confronts her again and goes to speak to Tane, she punches him. Tane treats Scott's bloody nose and when he goes to get ice, Eliza threatens Scott.
12 March–24 April	Gage Reynolds	Tom Wilson	A member of the River Boys surf gang. Gage is drinking in Salt when he overhears Theo Poulos and Sonny Baldwin talking about Theo spending all his savings on a car. He presumes they are both mechanics, and says he is interested in people who want to make money, before leaving his phone number with Sonny. The pair turn up at the River Boys hangout in Mangrove River and Gage shows them around. They see various people stripping and modifying cars. Gage asks Theo and Sonny to fix his car for a fee. He then breaks up a nearby fight by hitting one of the men with a wrench. As Theo and Sonny look on, Gage kisses Lacey Miller. He pays Theo at the end of the day and promises them more work.
15 April–	Archie Parata	Various babies	Harper Matheson and Tane Parata's son. He develops a small cyst on his lung, which requires surgical intervention before he is born. While they wait for the surgery to go ahead, Harper and Tane name their son Archie Wiremu, with his middle name coming from his late uncle Ari Parata. Months later, Harper goes into labour a day before her scheduled caesarean and Archie is born naturally with Levi Fowler's assistance. He reassures Harper and Tane that Archie is okay, before the pair are taken to the hospital. Harper haemorrhages, but undergoes successful surgery. She asks Tane to leave, but later relents after seeing the Korowai Tane has gifted to his son. Tane later shows Archie off around Summer Bay and introduces him to his friends. Harper, Dana and Archie eventually leave Summer Bay to escape Harper's violent ex boyfriend Beau.
24 April–30 October 2025 27 January 2026	Nurse Kylie	Clementine Anderson	A nurse at Northern Districts Hospital. The following year, she tells Justin Morgan that even though he has been discharged, she has a duty of care and cannot let him leave the hospital alone. Alf Stewart overhears and asks the nurse if it is okay that Justin goes with him.
12 May–	Debra Fowler	Tammy MacIntosh	Eden Fowler, Levi Fowler and Abigail Fowler's mother, who is invited to a gathering at Gary Morrow's farm to watch Cash Newman propose to Eden. Before the proposal, she catches up with Abigail and meets Levi's partner Mackenzie Booth for the first time. Deb tries to talk to Abigail about her life, but she is evasive and Levi causes a distraction to allow Abigail to leave. Deb thanks Mack for employing her daughters and making Levi happy. She admits that her husband leaving her was the best thing that happened to her, although it did not feel like it at the time. She then jokes that his former wife was on the dull side and gets Mack to tell her the name of Abigail's boyfriend, who she plans to meet. She later attends Cash and Eden's wedding.
29 May – 8 July	Avalon Bracken	Gemma Dart	A singer who watches Kirby Aramoana's recording session, distracting her. She introduces herself to Kirby's friend and producer Remi Carter, and Kirby reveals that she was forced to listen to Avalon's album by her former manager. Avalon tells them that she is recording her second album next door and suggests adding some backing vocals to Kirby's track. Avalon later watches Remi playing the guitar and invites him to join her and some of the other studio musicians for drinks, but he declines. She tells him that he looked like he was having more fun playing the guitar than sitting at the mixing desk. The following day, Kirby and Remi find Avalon going through notes in their studio and she quickly leaves. Avalon later asks Remi to work on her album and he agrees. She offers him drugs when he finds working on both albums is becoming stressful. Avalon and Kirby become friends and decide to record a duet for Kirby's album. Remi is initially reluctant to get involved as it means more work, but Justin Morgan talks him around. However, Kirby changes her mind in order to get her album finished. Avalon and Remi have a one-night stand after a party. She later turns up at his house after he misses a recording session, but Eden Fowler is hostile towards her and asks her to leave. Avalon declares that Remi has felt more alive in the past few weeks recording with her than he has done in months. She leaves when Remi's girlfriend Bree Cameron arrives. Eden later confronts Avalon, who asks her and Sonny Baldwin for their help in convincing Remi to continue working on her album, but they refuse.
18 June	Samantha Luther	Heidi May	Constable Bowman tries to get Samantha to move on, after receiving a call about her illegally squatting in a tent with her son Cohen Luther. The pair argue and Sergeant David Langham arrives on the scene. After seeing Cohen, David tries to bond with Samantha over their children. Bowman finds a dozen stolen mobile phones in her car and Samantha tries to get David to walk away, but she is arrested. At the station, she refuses to cooperate and it emerges that she has outstanding arrest warrants for shoplifting and breaking and entering. Samantha tells Cohen that she will only be gone one night and tries to reassure him that everything will be okay. She tells him she loves him and is taken back to her cell, before her court appearance in the morning. Samantha is denied bail and transferred to a women's prison. She also relinquishes her parental rights, saying she does not want anything to do with Cohen.
18 June 2025–	Constable Bowman	Nick Drummond	Sergeant David Langham sends Bowman and a colleague to move on Samantha Luther, who has been illegally squatting in a tent. He later contacts David to tell him that Samantha is not co-operating and David comes to the scene. As he talks with Samantha, Bowman finds a dozen stolen mobile phones in her car and places Samantha under arrest. At the station, Bowman learns Samantha's surname and discovers she has a number of outstanding arrest warrants. He realises that she will have to go before the magistrate in the morning and asks what will happen to her son Cohen Luther, but David says he will deal with him. Bowman calls David and Richie Brezniak to a campsite where Justin Morgan's stolen van has been found. When Richie accidentally shoots David, Bowman keeps pressure on the wound, but David tells him to secure the area and Bowman asks Richie to take over. Richie yells at Bowman to call Senior Constable Cash Newman, who arrives just as David is being loaded into the ambulance. When he asks Bowman what happened, Bowman explains that neither suspect shot David, but to talk to Richie. Bowman drives Richie back to the station and Cash later asks if David's daughters have been notified and Bowman tells him no. Bowman later tells Cash that they took the suspects in the van theft to Reefton Lakes Station.
30 July–2 September	Adrian Purcell	Tom Matthews	A man claiming to be Cohen Luther's father. He comes to the Yabbie Creek police station to meet with Sergeant David Langham and Cohen's social worker Harper Matheson. He tells them that he was in a relationship with Cohen's mother Samantha Luther, but when it ended, she told Adrian that he was not Cohen's father. David gets Adrian to fill out some forms ahead of a DNA test. Adrian overhears Cohen's foster parent Roo Stewart talking to David and he thanks her for looking after Cohen. Adrian worries that Roo will stop him from seeing Cohen, but David praises her for taking care of him. Adrian then shows him a photo of Cohen shortly after he was born.
31 July	Vivienne White	Diana Gyllén	A private investigator hired by Lacey Miller to look into the car accident that killed her mother. However, Vivienne later calls Lacey to let her know that she will not be taking on the case.
27–28 August	Bart Ainsworth	Charlie Falkner	A man brought into Northern Districts Hospital by paramedics. He is combative and agitated due to drugs and alcohol, and he assaults nurse Jo Langham. Bree Cameron gives him a sedative and attempts to insert a cannula, but Bart fights her and then stabs her with a pair of scissors, puncturing her lung. He leaves the hospital and Harper Matheson finds him wandering by the beach and asks if he is okay. Tane Parata spots them together and keeps Bart busy until the police arrive. He rushes into the sea and Cash Newman pursues him and arrests him for wounding with intent. At the station, Levi Fowler comes to treat Bart's wounds, and Bart expresses remorse for stabbing Bree.
17 September–	Hypnotherapist Amelia	Megan O'Connell	A hypnotherapist, who helps Jo Langham recall details of the day her mother Kristina Langham was killed in a car accident.
18 September–9 October	Craig Wendell	Justin Smith	A Red Gum Falls councillor suspected of causing the car accident that killed Kristina Langham. Jo Langham recalls a grey Mercedes and a partial number plate during hypnosis, which leads David Langham to Craig, who sold his matching car six days after the accident. David meets with Craig at Yabbie Creek police station, where Craig tells him that he does not remember what he was doing on that day and that any member of his staff could have been driving the car. Craig promises to have his team look into his old schedules and catches the eye of Jo as he leaves. David's investigation is later shut down, however, Lacey Miller contacts Craig and arranges to meet with him, after telling him that she knows he caused the accident and there is a witness. During the meeting in a country road, Lacey asks Craig to go to the police and confess, which he agrees to do. But when he gets back in his car, Craig accelerates towards Lacey intending to strike her with the car. Theo Poulos pushes Lacey out of the way and takes the full impact, killing him.
1 October	Kristina Langham	Fiona Noonan	David Langham's wife, and Jo Langham and Lacey Miller's mother seen in flashbacks, as Jo recalls the day she died when their car hit a tree. Lacey blames Jo for Kristina's death, as she was driving, but Jo later recalls that they were run off the road by another driver. He then checked Kristina's pulse, before fleeing the scene.
2 October–	Constable Alexa Lombard	Shannon Ryan	A police constable who works at Yabbie Creek Police Station. The following year, she takes part in a drugs search at Tane Parata's house and finds drugs under a cot mattress. After Lacey Miller is arrested under suspicion of the murder of Holden Dwyer, Lombard leads the interview. She tells Lacey that if she was sexually assaulted she has the option to be taken to the hospital, but Lacey says that she was not assaulted, although Holden tried. Lombard then asks Lacey to go through what happened. A couple of weeks later, Sergeant David Langham asks Lombard where Cash Newman is and she tells him that Cash is on leave and that the paperwork is on his desk. Days later, she lets David know that the DPP are on the phone. David also asks her to call legal aid and get a solicitor for Tane, after he hands himself in. When Cash's wife Eden Fowler comes by the station, Alexa tells her that Cash is not rostered on, but Eden tells her that he said he was dropping by. Alexa replies that she has not seen him and thought he was still in the city with Richie Brezniak.
7 October	Cassandra Poulos	Felicity Price	Theo Poulos's mother, who comes to Summer Bay following his death. Cassandra tells his aunt Leah Patterson and her husband Justin Morgan that she has come to collect his stuff, but they reveal that he moved out of their house months ago. Leah takes Cassandra to the police station to learn what happened to her son. David Langham speaks with Cassandra and tells her that Theo saved his daughter Lacey Miller from being hit by a car driven by Craig Wendell, who also killed David's wife. When Cassandra emerges from the office, she blames Leah for not taking care of Theo. She then bans Leah from Theo's funeral, telling her to stay away from her and her family.
23 October 2025 – 26 January 2026	Eddie Shepherd	Stephen Madsen	A musician who meets with producer Remi Carter. He is shown around by Eden Fowler, while they wait for Sonny Baldwin to arrive. Eddie performs for Eden and Remi, before Sonny arrives with food and drinks. As they get to know each other, Remi admits that he does not have a recording studio yet and that Eden is not signed to his label, Eddie would be the first. Eddie dislikes that he has been lied to and leaves. Sonny follows him and apologises, but Eddie says that he is not coming back. Sonny tells Eddie that Remi believes in him and he should give him a chance.
13 November 2025 – 10 February 2026	Kerrie Matheson	Sara Wiseman	Harper Matheson and Dana Matheson's mother. Harper decides to find Kerrie out of a desire to give her son Archie a grandmother in his life, but Dana is against it, constantly reminding Harper of their traumatic childhood, where Kerrie was addicted to drugs and constantly abused and neglected them. Believing that Kerrie has changed years later, Harper tracks her down and meets with her, ending up causing friction between her and Tane and a brief custody battle. Shortly after Harper and Tane slowly patch things up and seek a 50/50 custody arrangement, Kerrie arrives at the Bay, desiring to see Archie and bond with him, and eventually persuades a reluctant Harper to let her see Archie. Kerrie later attempts to convince Harper that she has changed for the better, but begins clashing with Tane, accusing him of being controlling and influencing Harper into not allowing her to see Archie, and the clash escalates further when Kerrie pays a visit to the Diner and convinces Marilyn Chambers to let her see Archie, only for Tane to come in and take him away. Kerrie attempts to turn Harper against Tane by claiming he's taking Archie away from Harper, but Harper quickly discovers that Kerrie has lied. Harper initially attempts to get Kerrie to get along with Tane, but Kerrie instead tries to blackmail Tane with his past conviction of abducting baby Poppy. Her scheme also fails when Tane points out to Kerrie that Harper already knew about his past action, and Tane later tells Harper about Kerrie's blackmail, causing Harper to realize that Kerrie has not changed at all. After Kerrie fails to reconnect with Dana, she is confronted by Harper over all her attempts to make Tane look bad, and Harper kicks her mother out of the Bay, while declaring that Tane is a much better parent than Kerrie was. Kerrie ultimately does leave the Bay, but before leaving, she spitefully makes one final attempt at revenge against Tane, by placing drugs in Archie's cot and framing Tane for the deed. For months, the drug charges against Tane are maintained and he faces a prison sentence, but Kerrie's revenge finally backfires when Brax discovers footage on Archie's baby monitor of Kerrie planting the drugs. Tane's charges are eventually dropped, and the police issue a warrant for Kerrie's arrest. Soon after, Harper is given a phone call from Kerrie, wanting to know why the police are after her, and Harper reveals the call to the police. Using an idea from Cash, Harper baits Kerrie into calling again by sending a photo of Archie, and manages to keep her on the line long enough for the police to track down her whereabouts. David Langham soon confirms to Cash and Harper that Kerrie has been found and arrested by the police. Harper also states that Kerrie will likely be given a 10-year prison sentence for her crimes.
19 November 2025 – 9 March 2026	Holden Dwyer	Lach Millar	Holden and his friend Isaac join a group from Summer Bay at a platform party, before they catch the train to the Off the Rails music festival. Holden meets Lacey Miller as they reach for the same drink. They literally bump into each other later on, before the train crashes. Dana Matheson tells Holden that Isaac has died as a result of the crash. A week later, Holden spends an afternoon with Lacey, who turns down his invite for a date. Holden becomes obsessed with Lacey and comes up with various reasons to spend time with her, until Mali Hudson stops him by brawling with him on the beach. Realising that Holden is stalking his daughter, David Langham convinces Lacey to take an AVO out against Holden, but Holden continues his stalking and breaks into the Beach House. Cash Newman arrests Holden for breaching his AVO, but Holden is bailed and continues stalking Lacey. Lacey stays at a room at the Bay Motel, only for Holden to break in and confront her. As Lacey attempts to run, Holden stops her and prepares to sexually assault her while pleading that he loves her. However, Lacey grabs a wooden lamp and hits Holden with it, killing him. David arrives and discovers what happened, confirming that Holden is dead before arresting Lacey for murder. Lacey's charges are eventually dropped after David convinces the prosecutor that the system who set Holden loose is to blame for the situation and that Lacey had no control over it.
19 November 2025 – 19 January 2026	Isaac	Jordan Dulieu	Isaac and his friend Holden join a group from Summer Bay at a platform party, before they catch the train to the Off the Rails music festival. Isaac tells Mackenzie Booth that they are going to see his cousin perform. He flirts with Mack as they party, but she turns him down. The train crashes, injuring those on board. Nurse Dana Matheson wakes to find Isaac next to her, but when she checks his pulse, she realises he has died. She later tells Holden that Isaac is dead.
