= Harper Matheson =

Fictional character in Home and Away

- Home and Away character
- Portrayed by: Jessica Redmayne
- Duration: 2023–2026
- First appearance: 10 August 2023
- Last appearance: 2 September 2026
- Introduced by: Lucy Addario
In-universe information
- Occupation: Social worker
- Father: Warwick Matheson
- Mother: Kerrie Matheson
- Sisters: Dana Matheson
- Sons: Archie Parata

Harper Matheson is a fictional character from the Australian soap opera Home and Away, played by Jessica Redmayne. The character made her debut on 10 August 2023 after an official announcement was made earlier that month. Harper arrives with her sister Dana Matheson (Ally Harris), and the pair were billed as hiding a secret upon Harper's arrival in Summer Bay, which was further expanded on as it was revealed that the two sisters were involved in a corruption case.

After settling into Summer Bay following the end of her legal struggles, Harper's storylines have mainly followed her relationship with Tane Parata (Ethan Browne) as the two embarked upon a turbulent relationship and engagement. The issue of co-parenting has been a significant theme for the character after the birth of their son Archie Parata in 2025.

Harper's profession, being a social worker, has been a recurring theme within her storyline arc as she has been central to the re-introduction of the topic of fostering, which was a prominent theme within the serial at the time of its inception. Through this, Harper has formed a professional-like relationship with Roo Stewart (Georgie Parker) as she has often aided Roo through her complex fostering cases, involving Eliza Sherwood (Martha Kate Morgan) and Cohen Luther (Nathan Murray).

== Casting ==
Redmayne's casting details were announced along with that of Ally Harris', who plays Harper's younger sister Dana Matheson on 2 August 2023. The pair were billed as having a connection to an established resident of Summer Bay and will be involved in "a mysterious storyline." Redmayne relocated to Sydney from Melbourne for the role and stated "Everyone was extraordinarily warm and welcoming. And I'm very fortunate to enter a really great company of people because it is really easy to come to work every day." She described her character as being "very protective" of Dana and willing to go "above and beyond" to protect her. She also said Harper was "quite empathetic, and very set in her ways. I think Harper is the kind of rigid sister and Dana's the more fluid, lives-life-on-the-edge sister." Harper made her first appearance on 10 August 2023.

Speaking to Kerry Harvey from Stuff, Redmayne expressed her joy at being cast in Home and Away, adding that she had auditioned several times before for the serial for a variety of roles. Redmayne continued that the character of Harper Matheson resonated with who she was as a person and that her and the character shared core values. Redmayne was pleased that her character's profession was a social worker and that that factor will make her background "interesting" moving forward. Redmayne also expressed her gratitude at having arrived into the serial with a "sister." She continued by saying that her and Ally Harris worked hard to establish a sisterly "chemistry" prior to filming.

== Development ==
=== Introduction and legal struggles ===
Harper arrived in Summer Bay in August 2023 and responded to Irene Roberts (Lynne McGranger) advertisement for a room to rent. Harper introduced herself as a social worker on leave, presenting herself as friendly and professional. However, her behavior quickly raised suspicions—especially with John Palmer (Shane Withington), who noticed her avoiding the police and reported his concerns to Senior Constable Cash Newman (Nicholas Cartwright). Cash looked into her only to discover that he already knew Harper prior to her arrival in Summer Bay as they worked together professionally on cases.

However, Harper had an ulterior motive for her arrival in Summer Bay: her sister Dana was on the run, accused of stealing drugs after a stash taken from the hospital where she worked was discovered in the apartment she shared with her boyfriend, Olly. This link to Cash was soon revealed as the main reason for Harper's arrival as Harper asked Cash to investigate the matter — but withheld a key detail: Dana was thought to be on the run but Harper already knew Dana's whereabouts, having secretly hidden her in her room at Irene's house. Detective Madden (Jonny Pasvolsky) was introduced as the lead officer on Dana's case. He appeared irritated by Cash's probing questions, which challenged his authority, and hinted at ulterior motives by making a secretive call requesting information on Cash. Later, Madden confronted Cash about his personal connection to Harper, which had not been disclosed during his defence of Dana. He accused Cash of favouritism and warned him to back off, saying: “Let me put Matheson away before you get yourself in some real trouble.” The situation escalated when Cash discovered Harper hiding Dana at Irene's house, potentially implicating him further.

It was later confirmed that Detective Madden was corrupt and he later kidnapped Dana and had his associate Detective Fletcher (James Biasetto) inject Dana with a syringe in the attempt to kill her. Madden gave instruction to Fletcher to set up Dana's apparent death to appear as a suicide. However, Dana manages to knock Fletcher out and place a call on his phone to Harper. At the assistance of Rose Delaney (Kirsty Marillier), Harper and Cash manage to track down Dana's location as they trace the location of the call. Dana recovers in Northern Districts Hospital and manages to wake up after being treated by Bree Cameron (Juliet Godwin). However, Rose warns Harper that she, Cash and Irene could face potential charges for their involvement in Dana's case as they were harboring a fugitive and essentially an accessory to the case.

Harper also faced tension with Cash's girlfriend Eden Fowler (Stephanie Panozzo) after Cash was suspended from work for rule-breaking and Harper reveals she has lost her own job during her absence from work as her boss disliked her already prior to her taking leave. Harper was then arrested and charged with hindering a police investigation and was forced to spend a night in lock-up with Irene before seeing the magistrate the next day. Harper and Irene both plead guilty to their charges and it was there that they were released pending sentencing. Harper's lawyer revealed to her that Irene had prior convictions to her name and Harper was advised to distance herself from Irene. However, Harper refused and instead suggested that both she and Dana look for employment in Summer Bay in order to support Irene. However, Irene actually asked the two sisters to move out of the Beach House, due to Dana, but Harper chose to stand by Irene. On their own persistence, both Harper and Dana attended Irene's court case and it was then that all charges against Irene were dropped as well as Harper's own charges, much to the relief of everybody.

=== Friendship with Tane Parata ===
In November 2023, following the end of Harper's struggles with the law, writers established a friendship between Harper and local gym owner Tane Parata (Ethan Browne). Harper, being left unemployed, starts to fill her time with gym sessions at Summer Bay Fit. It is there that she befriends Tane and became a sounding board for him as his marriage to Felicity Newman (Jacqui Purvis) began to break down. Harper ends up finding employment at Northern District Health and continues her training sessions with Tane. However, Felicity wants nothing more than a reconciliation with Tane but she takes notice of Tane and Harper growing closer and tells Harper to “back off.” To which Harper rebuts but later regrets. Harper considers placing some distance between herself and Felicity before Felicity apologises to her. Harper and Tane continue their friendship and after Tane confronts Felicity and confirms to her that their marriage is over, Tane is feeling happy in himself. Tane debriefs his conversation with Felicity to Harper the next day during a training session. However, Tane misreads Harper's friendship towards him and kisses her. Harper immediately pulls away from Tane and leaves the training session abruptly. Tane manages to catch up to Harper and she tells Tane that it is best if they keep their distance from one another. Harper tells Dana about the situation to which she only finds amusement but Harper is adamant that she will not be another rebound for Tane. After speaking to Cash, Tane agrees that it is best if Harper and himself keep their distance. Tane apologizes to Harper and passes on details of another personal trainer to her as a solution to their problems. However, the two decide to go back to being friends after Harper approaches Tane on the beach after seeing him finish up a bootcamp class. Harper tells Tane that she wants their friendship to continue and the two decide to agree to act as if nothing had ever happened between them. Felicity later overhears that Tane kissed Harper in a conversation between Harper and Dana. Harper approaches Tane to warn him about this. Tane and Felicity later come face-to-face and they approach the subject of Tane's kiss. Felicity surprises Tane by reaffirming that their marriage is over and that she could not care about his kiss with Harper. However, Tane's surprise at Felicity's maturity regarding the situation leads to them having a moment of passion and they end up sleeping together. After this, Tane takes off to New Zealand and is unsure of when he will be back.

Later, Harper learns that her ex-fiancé, Tony, is welcoming a baby with his new partner. This leaves Harper feeling deflated and as a result Dana sets Harper up on a date with Xander Delaney (Luke Van Os). Dana has Xander arrive at their home ready to take Harper on a date to the 'Moonlight at Salt' event that is taking place that night at Salt. Harper and Xander make for an exciting couple at Salt, however, the next morning they decide separately that they only like each other as friends and are better off being friends. Harper then finds herself signing up to a dating app and, at the advice of Tane, embarks upon an unfortunate date with a guy named Derek. Harper says that she quickly realizes that Derek is only interested in using Harper to make his ex-girlfriend jealous. After blowing off Derek's invite back to his place, Harper instead decides she would prefer to be with Tane and have pizza. After learning that Dana actually liked Xander, Harper encourages her to pursue him and the two eventually build a committed relationship together.

=== Abandoned baby case ===
In 2024, writers rejuvenated Tane's need to become a father. A need that the character has had since his inception into the serial and later the reason that caused his marriage with Felicity Newman to break down. In February 2024, a new story arc was created for Tane and was central to his wants of becoming a father. Tane found an abandoned baby on the beach and took her to Northern Districts Hospital where Dr. Bree Cameron gave the baby a medical exam and contacted child services in order to begin a search for her parents. As a result, Harper played a key role in the storyline through her profession of being a social worker at Northern District Health. Tane begins to bond with the baby and after a while he gives her the name Maia. Tane's behavior sparks concern amongst his friends Mackenzie Booth (Emily Weir) and Mali Hudson (Kyle Shilling), as well as Harper. News soon travels throughout Summer Bay and a showcase of mixed reactions from the locals are soon unveiled as the town learns of the abandoned baby and Tane's close affiliation with the case. However, the storyline also prompts an exploration into the backstory of Harper and Dana and their childhoods. The two sisters become divided over their perspectives on Maia's situation. Dana takes a rather harsher approach to the idea of Maia becoming reunited with her mother whilst Harper's view is based upon her own history in social work as well as having a professional association with the specific case of Maia and the search for her mother. Later scenes, consisting of the two sisters discussing the issue again, see Dana describing their parents as "too irresponsible" and revealed that both parents of Harper and Dana were drug addicts. Dana also lashes out at Harper in these scenes by criticising Harper's approach to her profession as a social worker. Dana is seen discussing the issue with Xander Delaney where she tells him that her and Harper's parents “weren't really equipped to have children."

After bonding with Maia and after pursuing the idea of becoming a foster father to her, Tane is upset to learn that he is unable to become a foster father as he is not an official Australian citizen. A media frenzy begins to form surrounding the issue of Maia and a news article regarding Tane's continued association with the baby is published. Harper shows the article to Tane and tells him that it was Dana who provided information on Tane after being tricked by the journalist who wrote it. A formal complaint is later made against Tane by the journalist which forces Rose Delaney to take out an AVO on Tane. The complaint also results in only health and social care staff having access to Maia. Harper later advises Roo Stewart (Georgie Parker) over becoming a foster parent to Maia after she was approached by Tane who had the idea in mind. Tane is devastated to learn that a temporary foster mother has been put in place to take Maia. Harper attempts to reassure Tane that Maia is in great hands with her new-found foster family. However, Tane lashes out at Harper after she refuses to reveal the identity of the foster family to Tane. This leads to Tane entering the hospital, with the assistance of Dana, and kidnapping Maia. When Harper learns that it was Dana who gave Tane access to Maia, she blasts Dana for doing so. After Maia is kidnapped by Tane, her birth mother Sonia Rickard (Olivia Beadsley) comes forward and a police manhunt is launched in order to find Tane. He later hands himself into the police. Tane is handed a court date and is informed that he could be facing serious prison time for his actions.

During this time, in the lead up to Tane's sentencing, he and Harper grow closer and Tane is quick to “lean in” towards his friendship with her as she offers him “comfort and support.” The two later have sex in Summer Bay Fit, the night before his sentencing. After managing to avoid jail time, Tane has to attend a training and counselling course in Sydney, as part of his punishment. This leaves Harper to contemplate her feelings for Tane after their night of passion on the eve of his sentencing. After returning from Sydney, Tane sets up a youth programme for Summer Bay and avails of Harper's help in establishing it. Initially, Harper is reluctant to become involved due to her feelings for Tane but she later sees how Tane would be reliant on her in order to set up the programme. The programme is a youth offenders rehabilitation programme that takes place at the gym. One youth who was selected by Harper is Perri Hayes (Cantona Stewart). Tane and Harper develop a strong relationship with Perri as he grapples to survive in his current homelife given the abuse that he endures at the hands of his father. Towards the end of this arc, Harper is quick to befriend Bronte Langford (Stefanie Caccamo), who is apparently battling a serious autoimmune disease, after Irene invites her to board with herself, Harper and Dana at the Beach House. Harper brushes off Dana's concerns and scepticism regarding Bronte's actions in Summer Bay and instead focuses on her role in Tane's youth programme. Weeks later, it is revealed that Bronte was a con-artist and Irene suffers immense guilt following the arrest of Bronte and finds herself deeply embarrassed after choosing to believe what Bronte said to her when she called Irene “gullible.” This ordeal causes Irene to relapse in her alcoholism and is eventually admitted to rehab, leaving Harper and Dana to live by themselves in the Beach House for several months until Irene returns to Summer Bay in 2025.

=== Pregnancy and engagement to Tane Parata ===
In July 2024, a pregnancy was scripted for the character of Harper, writing Tane to be the biological father after the night they spent together in the gym on the eve of his sentencing. Harper's sister Dana is the first person to know about the pregnancy after Harper reveals it to her. Harper tells Dana that she is unsure as to what she wants to do as she acknowledges that Tane is still married to Felicity and that they have never discussed continuing on a relationship after their night together in the gym. The pregnancy storyline coincides with the introduction of Perri Hayes and the familial relationship that he and Tane continue to build together. This makes it difficult for Harper to announce the news, if she wanted to, to Tane as he struggles to make time to see her from being preoccupied with Perri's home-life. It is not until the following month that Harper announces the news to Tane, at the reception of Felicity's funeral after she died following a brain aneurysm. It is at the funeral that Tane begins to fight with Perri's father, Carl Hayes (Matthew Holmes) and Harper tells him that she is pregnant with his child. The episodes that followed the death of Felicity and her funeral garnered some of the highest rated episodes of the 2024 season with viewers exceeding 900,000. However, Jessica Redmayne, Harper's portrayer, received extensive negative comments and backlash online following the announcement of Harper's pregnancy. Many fans of Felicity and Tane's relationship chose to have a negative reaction to the announcement. Redmayne took to social media and stated that while fans should be able to voice their opinion, they should not “attack” her for doing her job as an actor.

Tane is shocked by Harper's announcement and his first reaction is to drink which results in him in a drunken state. However, Tane decides to step up and stay by Harper's side and make their baby his number one priority. However, Harper is annoyed following Tane's initial reaction to the pregnancy as he “blacked out” from drinking. Harper tells Tane that she considered not following through with the pregnancy which annoys him and he is further annoyed to learn that Dana and Xander Delaney knew of the pregnancy before he did. The storyline continues to progress quickly as Harper and Tane decide to go through with the pregnancy and having the child together. Tane's commitment to Perri acts as an obstacle in the early stages of the pregnancy as Tane finds it hard to balance both Perri and Harper. Harper rushes to hospital after discovering that she is experiencing bleeding, after getting a hold of Tane, he too rushes to the hospital. This occurs on the same day that Perri has a court appearance against his father, Carl. Writers progressed the storyline by showcasing elements of potential romance between Tane and Harper after an accidental date between the two was arranged by Dana, with the help of Marilyn Chambers (Emily Symons). Harper and Tane later both supported Perri after he was arrested following the death of his father which occurred after Perri drowned him in the Parata's swimming pool. Harper and Tane support him through his court hearings but he is later saved after a new witness comes forward. Perri later departs for New Zealand after being reunited with his mother, Kaia Hayes (Akina Edmonds).

Following the departure of Perri, Harper and Tane work on their relationship together. However, Harper comes to realise that their relationship was built around Tane's tribulations from his affiliation with baby Maia, to his mentorship with Perri. Harper also acknowledges that her and Tane speak very little about anything other than the baby. Harper confides in Dana about her feelings regarding the nature of her and Tane's relationship. Harper also admits that if it were not for the baby, she does not think her and Tane would be together. Dana proposes the idea of banning conversation around the baby for an entirety of 24 hours in order to find out more about one another after Harper acknowledges that Tane actually knows very little about her. Harper proposes the idea to Tane which only results in an awkward silence between the two which in turn proves Harper's point. Later Tane arranges for a romantic meal with Harper at Salt and she has the opportunity to tell Tane more about herself. Despite their romantic meal at Salt, Tane still continues to have discussions with Harper that solely revolve around the baby. Harper once again confides in Dana about this. Dana later tells Tane that he needs to let Harper know that his love for her is real. This in turn results in Tane taking drastic action by proposing to Harper. Harper is left shocked at the proposal and questions Tane if he would have done the same thing under different circumstances. Tanes reiterates that he is committed to Harper and wants to spend the rest of his life with her. Harper accepts Tane's proposal as a result. The engagement between Harper and Tane causes skepticism amongst the residents of Summer Bay. In the following weeks after their engagement, Tane and Harper attend a routine scan for the baby, only to be informed that there is a cyst on the baby's lung. Harper is faced with an ultimatum regarding her baby's life; she can either have surgery but face the risk of going into early labour, or she can opt to not have surgery but risk the cyst growing on her baby's lung if it is not removed. Harper initially decides to not have surgery but faces backlash from Tane and Dana. After much deliberation, Harper decides to go through with the surgery which is performed by Dr. Levi Fowler (Tristan Gorey). As Harper is admitted to the hospital, she and Tane choose a name for their unborn baby – Archie Wiremu – to honor her grandfather and his brother. The operation proves to be a success and Levi manages to successfully remove the cyst from the baby's lung. After the surgery, Harper experiences a sudden contraction but is later treated at the hospital and her and the baby are stabilized.

Following her surgery, Harper continues to be haunted with self-doubt with regards to her relationship with Tane. Initially, after their engagement, Harper and Tane agreed to have the wedding before the birth of their baby after Harper stated that it would be more “traditional” for the two of them to be married prior to the arrival of their baby. Harper had initially wanted a “big day” to celebrate her wedding with Tane but their wedding planning made plans for the day to be a quiet day after Tane showed no interest in having elaborate plans. Harper continued to follow Tane's wishes but secretly wanted a celebratory day for herself. Dana can see that Harper is not happy with the decision of having a simple registry office ceremony and so she confronts Tane over the situation. Tane protests to Dana that Harper wants a low-key wedding but Dana makes him see the light. Harper eventually reveals that she does want to have the big wedding day that every girl wants. Harper later departs for the city for a few weeks to finish off a final work hand-over before she takes her maternity leave. Harper continues her wedding plans in the city as she shops for wedding dresses.

Later, Harper returns from the city earlier than expected and received an underwhelming reception from Tane after she surprises him. Roo Stewart then contacts Harper in order to seek advice over her new foster kid, Eliza Sherwood (Martha Kate Morgan). Harper offers to speak to Eliza herself to try and unravel the situation and mentality that Eliza is in right now. Roo confesses to Harper that Eliza has been "fixated" on Harper's pregnancy, but Harper brushes this off and assures Roo that she can handle it. Over the closing weeks of Harper's pregnancy, she becomes closer to Eliza who is fascinated with her unborn baby. Harper's burgeoning relationship with Eliza causes her to clash with Tane, as Eliza used to attend Tane's youth programme but was later kicked out. Harper's engagement then ends the morning of her wedding to Tane as she confronted him the night before and admitted that he does not truly love her. Redmayne spook to TV Week regarding Harper's impending marriage to Tane, "They’re entering a loveless marriage which, deep down, neither of them wants." Harper calls of the wedding, the relationship and tells Tane that she is going to raise their baby by herself as she refuses to co-parent. Redmayne continued by justifying Harper's actions by stating, "Harper finds the idea of being around Tane to co-parent Archie extremely difficult." The day before Harper is booked in to have a caesarean to deliver her baby, she goes for a walk with Eliza in the forest, in Summer Bay Reserve. It is here that Harper's water breaks and she only has Eliza to rely on for help. Harper asks Eliza to phone for an ambulance but Eliza only pretends to do so. Redmayne spoke to TV Week regarding the ordeal and clarifies Eliza's intentions, "Harper believes Eliza is fascinated with pregnancy and babies, but she doesn’t realise it’s the pain of giving birth that Eliza is captivated by." Whilst stuck out at the bush, Harper notices several missed calls from Tane and she phones him back and tells him where she is and that she is there with Eliza. Tane rushes to find her with the assistance of Levi Fowler. Once they find Harper, Levi successfully delivers their baby boy, Archie Parata. Both Harper and Archie are brought to hospital where they recuperate. Harper begins to haemorrhage and is rushed into emergency surgery in order to stop her internal bleeding. Levi explains her reasoning for haemorrhaging as her giving birth naturally was too much for her body to handle. Tane and Mackenzie wait by Harper's beside alongside Dana as they wait for Harper to return from her surgery and Tane begins to bond with Archie. When Harper is returned to her hospital room and wakes up, she orders Tane out of the room due to her personal feelings towards him. Harper later realises her actions after she receives a box of cultural belongings from Tane that is meant for Archie. Harper then tells Tane that she wants him to be in Archie's life.

=== Co-parenting with Tane Parata ===
Harper’s initial story arc following the birth of Archie, followed her as she adapted to the routine of co-parenting with Tane. Writers developed numerous issues throughout the initial stages of this new phase for both Harper’s and Tane’s character development. Harper’s continuing resentment of Tane after their turbulent relationship continued to be a major theme of their co-parenting journey. Speaking to TV Week after the initial wake of their cancelled wedding, and days before the birth of Archie, Redmayne spoke of Harper’s feelings for Tane and Redmayne commented, “Harper is still very much in love with Tane.” After going through her traumatic labour with Archie, and recuperating in hospital, Harper tells Tane that she wants him to leave the hospital room, insinuating that she is not ready to face Tane or have him within her or Archie’s life. Harper is later visited in hospital by her friend Cash Newman (Nicholas Cartwright) who explains to her that Tane is not doing so well after she questions Cash on how he is. Mackenzie Booth (Emily Weir), who has been present throughout Harper’s recuperation in hospital, pushes Harper on the subject and later delivers her a box from Tane. The box contained a handwritten note from Tane and a Korowai, a traditional Maori cloak. Harper relies on Dana throughout this time and decides to let Tane come back to the hospital and she apologises for her previous behaviour. Stefania Sarrubba of Yahoo! News questioned if this was going to be the beginning of a successful co-parenting relationship between the two characters.

After initially coming to grips with co-parenting, the issue of Harper and Tane’s pre-planned honeymoon in Japan arose. Tane spoke to Harper and told her that he wants her to use the tickets and that she should ask Dana to go on the honeymoon instead of him. After speaking to Dana, Harper confesses to Tane that she would still like the two of them to go on the honeymoon, platonically. However, when the time arrives to leave for the airport, Harper backs out and leaves Tane to board the plane by himself. During Tane’s departure, writers scripted Harper’s return to work, before her maternity leave was up. This development results in her playing a central figure in the introduction of Cohen Luther (Nathan Murray). Cohen is a homeless boy placed into the social care system and becomes an emergency foster care child for Roo Stewart (Georgie Parker) after his mother relinquished her parental rights. As a result of her decision to return to work, Harper places Archie in daycare without speaking about the issue with Tane first.

In the middle of 2025, Australian actress and model Maddison Brown was cast in the role of Jo Langham. Brown’s addition to the serial was heavily publicised throughout Australia. Through this publicity, it was established that her character would become romantically involved with Tane. As a result, Tane’s burgeoning relationship with Jo played another stumbling block for Harper and Tane.

== Reception ==
In the middle of 2024, as the character of Harper began to grow closer to Tane, Redmayne experienced backlash online from fans of the show. Many fans of Tane and Felicity's relationship and marriage began to strike out at Redmayne for her character's actions. Many fans called for Harper's departure from the show following scenes in which Harper revealed she was pregnant. Redmayne was forced to take to social media in order to defend herself as a person. Redmayne was forced to remind fans that her "job is acting not writing." She also requested for fans to not "attack" actors after stating that fans are allowed to have an opinion. Yahoo! Lifestyle noted that Harper's presence has been "polarizing" since her introduction. Redmayne also had to take to Instagram once again to confirm to viewers that she, herself, was not pregnant in real life following much speculation from fans.
