= The Australian Canon =

The Australian Canon refers to those texts by Australian authors that espouse the values of canonicity. These values are dynamic and contentious but may generally be said to include: timelessness, universal concerns, a unique Australian identity, an authentic representation of what it means to be 'Australian'.

Contentious concerns include the emergence of a distinctive Australian literature and arguments about contending literary canons, including the relation between ‘generational canons’, ‘middlebrow’ and ‘academic’ canons, the ‘syllabus’ and the ‘canonical imaginary’.

== Canonical Texts ==
Baynton, Barbara, Bush Studies, (1902)

Lawson, Henry, While the Billy Boils, (1896)

Franklin, Miles, My Brilliant Career, (1901)

Cambridge, Ada, A Woman's Friendship, (1988)

Richardson, Henry Handel, Maurice Guest (1908)

White, Patrick, Riders in the Chariot, (1961)

Lindsay, Norman, The Magic Pudding, (1918)

== Contentiousness ==
David Carter writes:

As a value-laden rather than neutral descriptive term, "Australian literature" is more likely to be contentious than consensual; ironically it has often been contentious precisely because it has functioned to represent one version of consensus against another. Not only do definitions of Australian literature shift over time, at any one time different and potentially conflicting definitions will be operating across the various sites and layers of the culture. The idea of Australian literature is better understood, then, in one of the telling, if excessively self-dramatising phrases of recent criticism, as a "site of struggle" where these different definitions or institutional effects are given social and material form. It is political, therefore, because much more are at stake than competing individual literary tastes, or at least there may be under certain social and institutional conditions. The precise relationship between the institutional politics within literature and politics beyond the institution has more often been mystified than clarified.
