= List of Home and Away characters introduced in 2023 =

Home and Away is an Australian television soap opera. It was first broadcast on the Seven Network on 17 January 1988. The following is a list of characters that appear in 2023, by order of first appearance. All characters are introduced by the soap's executive producer, Lucy Addario. The 36th season of Home and Away began airing from 9 January 2023. Mali Hudson made his debut in the same week. His sister Elandra was introduced in February. Kahu Parata arrived in April. Sisters Harper Matheson and Dana Matheson made their first appearances in August. Levi Fowler made his debut in November.

== Mali Hudson ==
Mali Hudson, played by Kyle Shilling, made his first appearance on 11 January 2023. The character and Shilling's casting details were announced on 5 December 2022. Home and Away marks his first television role. Shilling is from the Wiyabal clan of the Bundjalung people. He hoped his casting would serve as inspiration to other Aboriginal viewers, like himself when he was younger. He stated: "If I had seen someone like me on a popular TV show when I was a kid, I would have been more driven as a young person to want to better myself and explore acting. As Indigenous people, we are always categorised as athletes; there was never any other avenue I thought I could go down. When you feel like you’re stereotyped your whole life, that has a huge effect. Looking back on my 10-year-old self, if I had seen someone like Mali Hudson on such a big series, I would have wanted to be him." Upon winning the role, Shilling was told that the writers and producers wanted to work his character around what he did in his audition and who he was. His character and storylines were developed alongside an Aboriginal script consultant, who also helped with the creative decisions for Mali and his introduction.

Shilling described Mali as being "fun, he's cheeky, he cares for his family". It was also teased that Mali has a connection to an established character, which was later confirmed to be Dean Thompson (Patrick O'Connor). The pair are old friends and Shilling commented "You see their friendship blossom again after reconnecting on screen, it's a great story." In his first scenes, it is established that Mali is a surfboard shaper, who helps design and build the surfboards for Dean's shop. Dean introduces Mali to his partner Ziggy Astoni (Sophie Dillman) and John Palmer (Shane Withington), who invites Mali to join the surf lifesaver team. Dean and Ziggy later realise that Mali has "a specific reason" for visiting the Bay, but he keeps it to himself.

== Elandra Hudson ==
Elandra Hudson
- Home and Away character
- Portrayed by: Rarriwuy Hick
- Duration: 2023–2024
- First appearance: 28 February 2023
- Last appearance: 2 July 2024
- Introduced by: Lucy Addario
In-universe information
- Mother: Victoria Hudson
- Brothers: Iluka Hudson; Mali Hudson

Elandra Hudson, played by Rarriwuy Hick, made her first appearance on 28 February 2023. Hick confirmed her casting on her social media on 26 February, writing "The cat's out the bag. Guess who's visiting Summer Bay." Details about her character and storyline were revealed in the 4–10 March 2023 issue of TV Week. Elandra is the sister of Mali Hudson (Kyle Shilling), who was introduced in January. The siblings are reunited when Elandra pays him a visit in Summer Bay, where he has recently moved to. She initially accuses him of moving to the Bay for "a fling" after catching him with Rose Delaney (Kirsty Marillier), who she then invites out to lunch. It emerges that Mali did not tell his family about his move and they want him to come home. However, Rose makes Elandra see what Mali brings to the town and opens up about her feelings for him. After "a heart-to-heart" with Mali, Elandra realises that the Bay is a fresh start for her brother.

Elandra comes to Summer Bay to see her brother Mali, but interrupts him and Rose Delaney, who has spent the night with him. She asks Mali why he moved away without telling the family, before letting him show her around town. She accepts his decision to stay in the Bay, but says that he will have to tell their mother soon. Elandra later tells Mali to get back together with Rose when they break up. She also calls Rose to say that her brother should never have broken up with her. Elandra joins Mali when he introduces Rose to their mother, Victoria Hudson (Ursula Yovich). When Victoria takes Rose off to talk alone, Elandra tells Mali that she is angry with him. Over lunch, Victoria asks Rose what she does for a living and upon learning Rose is a police officer, Victoria wants to leave and tells Malo that his father would be ashamed of him. Elandra advises Mali to talk to their mother, while explaining to Rose that their brother has been in trouble with the police before, which has led to racial profiling of the whole family. She takes her mother home, after Victoria invites Rose to meet the rest of the family one day.

Mali and Elandra's brother Iluka Hudson (Dion Williams) comes to stay with Mali, after stealing money from the Allen gang. Mali contacts Elandra, after Iluka is forced to leave with the Allens. When she arrives, she tells him the Allen's place has gone dark, while he says that Nat Allen (Claire Lovering) was cold when Levi Fowler (Tristan Gorey) was stabbed. Mali wonders what they will do to Iluka. Elandra helps him tidy the house until Theo Poulos (Matt Evans) brings an injured Iluka home. Elandra thanks Theo and tells him that they will take care of Iluka, however, when he starts coughing up blood, Elandra gets Mali to call an ambulance. The pair tell Bree Cameron (Juliet Godwin) that Iluka fell down the stairs, but she figures out that he was attacked. Bree later tells them that Iluka has some internal bleeding, but he should be fine. Elandra overhears Mali arranging to meet the Allens to finish things, and she tries to talk him out of it. Elandra tells Iluka that Mali is not happy with him and that he told her about the money. Iluka warns her that Nat has changed and they need to stay far away from that family. Elandra calls Rose, who, along with her colleagues, break up the fight between Mali and the Allen brothers. When Mali turns up at the hospital, he tells Elandra that she was the only one who knew where he was going, but she counters that she was not going to lose him and only cares that her brothers are alive. She adds that she does not trust what Mali is going to do next.

== Kahu Parata ==
Kahu Parata
- Home and Away character
- Portrayed by: Jordi Webber
- First appearance: 13 April 2023
- Last appearance: 17 May 2023
- Introduced by: Lucy Addario
In-universe information
- First cousins: Tane Parata

Kahu Parata, played by Jordi Webber, made his first appearance on 13 April 2023. Webber's casting was confirmed shortly before his first appearance. His character was introduced as a cousin of Tane Parata (Ethan Browne), whose on-screen family had all departed the series. After turning up unexpectedly in Summer Bay Kahu is invited to stay with Tane and his new wife Felicity Newman (Jacqui Purvis), who was hoping their honeymoon period would last longer. However, she welcomes Kahu after seeing how much his presence pleases Tane. In an interview with Tamara Cullen of TV Week, Webber stated "Tane and Kahu have always been close. As soon as they catch up again, they click and jive right where they left off." Kahu later asks for a job at Tane's gym, leaving Felicity to wonder how long he is planning to stay. Purvis said that her character likes Kahu, but she is still in the honeymoon phase and does not want anyone to take Tane away from her. Tane eventually offers Kahu a temporary job at the gym, before learning Kahu has no qualifications as a trainer, which could jeopardise his business. Describing his character, Webber said "Kahu hasn't quite learned the value of honesty, working hard and trust. He has a carefree attitude. He's this cheeky, fun, mischief, surfie, rolling stone who comes into town and brings the music." He found it fun to play out his character's "'no care' attitude". Cullen commented that Kahu could prove to be a "loose cannon" and wondered what his real reason for coming to the Bay was.

Kahu surprises his cousin Tane and his wife Felicity with an unannounced visit to the Bay. He admits that he needs a break and catching up with Tane in New Zealand made him realise how much he missed him. Tane invites Kahu to stay with him and Felicity, interrupting her plans for a romantic evening. In the morning, Kahu tells the couple that he plans to spend the day with Tane, but when Tane says that he needs to find a new trainer for the gym, Kahu offers to take the job.

== Harper Matheson ==
Harper Matheson, played by Jessica Redmayne, made her first appearance on 10 August 2023. Redmayne's casting details were announced along with that of Ally Harris', who plays Harper's younger sister Dana Matheson on 2 August 2023. The pair were billed as having a connection to an established resident of Summer Bay and will be involved in "a mysterious storyline." Redmayne relocated to Sydney from Melbourne for the role and stated "Everyone was extraordinarily warm and welcoming. And I'm very fortunate to enter a really great company of people because it is really easy to come to work every day." She described her character as being "very protective" of Dana and willing to go "above and beyond" to protect her. She also said Harper was "quite empathetic, and very set in her ways. I think Harper is the kind of rigid sister and Dana's the more fluid, lives-life-on-the-edge sister."

Harper arrived in Summer Bay in August of 2023 and responded to Irene Roberts (Lynne McGranger) advertisement for a room to rent. Harper introduced herself as a social worker on leave, presenting herself as friendly and professional.

== Dana Matheson ==
Dana Matheson
- Home and Away character
- Portrayed by: Ally Harris
- Duration: 2023–2026
- First appearance: 10 August 2023
- Last appearance: 2 September 2026
- Introduced by: Lucy Addario
In-universe information
- Occupation: Nurse; Lifeguard
- Mother: Kerrie Matheson
- Sisters: Harper Matheson
- Nephews: Archie

Dana Matheson, played by Ally Harris, made her first appearance on 10 August 2023. Harris' casting details were announced along with Jessica Redmayne's, who plays Dana's older sister Harper Matheson on 2 August 2023. The siblings have a connection to an established character and will be involved in "a mysterious storyline" following their arrival. Harris relocated to Sydney from Perth for filming and she was grateful to do it alongside Redmayne, who also had to relocate. Harris knew the cast a little and admitted that she had previously auditioned for some of their roles. She told Georgie Kearney of 7Life that she knew Juliet Godwin (Bree Cameron) "slightly" as they both came from Perth and attended the same school. She found the cast and crew to be very welcoming and recalled being told that they were like a family during her callback for the role, which she found to be true. Describing her character, Harris thought Dana was the opposite of her more "rigid" sister. She explained "Dana is definitely a little bit more idealistic and maybe more of a romantic kind of thinker than Harper is." She believed that their clashes stemmed from their differing values and "ways of approaching a situation."

Harris departed in the episode broadcast on 2 September 2026, along with Redmayne as their characters fled Summer Bay following Harper's domestic abuse storyline. Of leaving with her on-screen sister, Redmayne stated "I'm incredibly lucky to call Ally my on-screen sister. That girl is so talented, and she taught me a lot. She kept me calm and we became a wonderful support system for each other. I couldn't have done it without her."

== Levi Fowler ==
Levi Fowler
- Portrayed by: Tristan Gorey
- Duration: 2023–present
- First appearance: 7 November 2023
- Introduced by: Lucy Addario
In-universe information
- Occupation: Cardiothoracic surgeon
- Father: Jimmy Fowler
- Mother: Debra Fowler
- Sisters: Eden Fowler; Abigail Fowler
- Wife: Imogen Fowler (until 2025)

Levi Fowler, played by Tristan Gorey, made his first appearance on 7 November 2023. The character and Gorey's casting details were announced on 29 October 2023. When Gorey learned about the audition, he became "attached" to the character immediately and sent in a self-tape, before undergoing a chemistry test. After he won the role, Gorey relocated to Sydney from Perth for filming. He stated "I think Sydney is where I need to be right now. And I'm loving every minute of it." Gorey later commented that he was "ecstatic" to join Home and Away.

Levi is a Cardiothoracic surgeon, who has only recently qualified. He comes to Summer Bay to help save "a Home and Away favourite". Gorey later explained that his character is involved in a lengthy "really high-stakes storyline" that he believed would have viewers "gripped". Gorey described his character as "a driven, headstrong individual who believes hard work pays off." Levi loves his job and enjoys the opportunity to test himself. Gorey also said "Levi is a very passionate individual, who goes above and beyond for his patients." Upon his arrival, Levi introduces himself to Bree Cameron (Juliet Godwin), who is assured by his confidence. Dana Matheson (Ally Harris) "sings his praises" as he also saved her life. Of the patient he is treating, Gorey said "The stakes are high, and if Levi can't figure out what the problem is, there may be serious consequences for one of Summer Bay's most-loved characters." The character in question was revealed to be Mackenzie Booth (Emily Weir), who appears to have suffered a heart attack. Tamara Cullen of TV Week reported that Levi has links to other characters in the Bay, which results in "an explosive showdown." It later emerges that Levi is the brother of Eden Fowler (Stephanie Panozzo), from whom he has been estranged since their parents divorced, as Eden believes Levi took their father's side and abandoned the family. When the siblings later come face-to-face, the subject of their father comes up and they argue, with Eden declaring that the meeting was a mistake. For his portrayal of Levi, Gorey received a nomination for the Logie Award for Most Popular New Talent in 2024.

== Others ==
Date(s)	Character	Actor	Circumstances
12 January–15 March	Gabe Miller	Akos Armont	Mackenzie Booth's former fiancé. Gabe waits for Mack at her restaurant, Salt, but he is asked to leave by Dean Thompson and he realises that she may have seen him. He asks Dean to tell Mack that he just wants to talk. Gabe returns to Salt the following day and meets Mack, who tells him she has nothing to say, before asking him to leave. Gabe waits downstairs in the Surf Club and he eventually persuades Mack to talk. It emerges that Gabe jilted Mack two months before their wedding without leaving an explanation, only a brief note. Gabe explains that Mack's father Rick Booth offered him $50,000 to stay away from her and he accepted. He admits that he regrets taking the money, but Mack refuses to forgive him and tells him to go home. Gabe is later diagnosed with cancer and decides that he doesn't want Mackenzie to watch him die so he leaves Mackenzie a letter before leaving the bay. A month later Mackenzie receives a phone call from Gabe's business manager to tell her that Gabe has died.
24 January	Jordan Stanford	Dylan Hare	A Summer Bay Fit client, who takes a class run by Stacey Collingwood. After seeing her talk to Rose Delaney, he asks if all the beautiful women in the Bay know each other, leading Stacey to make the group do more burpees. Jordan walks Stacey up to Salt and gives her his phone number. He asks to buy her a drink, but she tells him that she is dating someone. Jordan says he is also seeing someone, and they arrange to go out to dinner together. Rose later finds the pair in Jordan's car buttoning up their clothes and tells them to move on.
31 January–9 March 2023 10–19 March 2025	Izzy Astoni-Thompson	Various babies (2023); Aluna Ruby Duffy and Harlow May Duffy (2025)	Ziggy Astoni and Dean Thompson's daughter. Ziggy briefly suffers from postpartum depression following the birth. She and Dean later announce that they have named their daughter Isabella "Izzy" Astoni-Thompson. Dean, Ziggy and Izzy later move to Queensland so they can be near Dean's son Jai Simmons. Dean's mother Karen Thompson also spends time with the family. Two years later, Izzy's aunt Mackenzie Booth and her partner Levi Fowler come for a visit. When Mack and Ziggy are kidnapped, Karen looks after Izzy while Dean and Levi rescue them.
16–28 March	Paramedic Jamie Chung	Hugo Liu	Xander Delaney's partner. The pair stop for a coffee break and are talking with Mali Hudson when Jamie notices Brock trying to break into their ambulance. He gives chase, but Brock runs off. A couple of weeks later, Xander and Jamie are called out to a remote location to treat a patient. Brock appears and Jamie then notices two other men behind them with weapons. The pair are attacked for the drugs in the ambulance and Jamie dies at the scene.
16–30 March	Brock	Ben Corlett	A man who tries to break into the back of Xander Delaney and Jamie Chung's ambulance. A couple of weeks later, Brock and two of his friends ambush Xander and Jamie. They attack them and steal the drugs from the ambulance. Jamie dies at the scene, while Xander is hospitalised.
16–21 March	Conor	Tom Dawson	A surfer, who notices Ava Gilbert arguing with Theo Poulos. He asks Ava if Theo is hassling her and she confirms that he is, before asking Conor if he will give her a lift. When they stop at the beach, Ava apologises for being a mess and Conor asks her what was happening with Theo. She explains that he is her boyfriend, or ex-boyfriend, and asks if she can hang around his camper van. Conor says she can while he goes for a surf and tells her that her phone has been going off. When he returns, Conor asks Ava if her parents will be worried, and then tells her that she cannot stay in the van forever, as he is moving down the coast. After returning from the showers, Conor is dressing when Ava's father Justin Morgan turns up and punches him in the face. He continues to attack Conor and accuses him of touching Ava. Another surfer holds Justin back, until the police arrive and arrest him. Conor is taken to the hospital and Justin is later charged for assaulting him.
27 March	Kaikaranga	Michelle Morunga	Tane Parata arranges for the Kaikaranga and Poi dancers to appear at his wedding to Felicity Newman. They welcome Felicity, her brother Cash Newman and Eden Fowler to the ceremony. Tui marries Tane and Felicity.
27 March	Maori Poi Performers	Celeste Thompson; Mina Martin; Riana Cooper	Tane Parata arranges for the Kaikaranga and Poi dancers to appear at his wedding to Felicity Newman. They welcome Felicity, her brother Cash Newman and Eden Fowler to the ceremony. Tui marries Tane and Felicity.
27 March	Tui	Miritana Hughes	Tane Parata arranges for the Kaikaranga and Poi dancers to appear at his wedding to Felicity Newman. They welcome Felicity, her brother Cash Newman and Eden Fowler to the ceremony. Tui marries Tane and Felicity.
28 March	Nurse Addie	Oscar Lin	The nurse helps Bree Cameron treat Xander Delaney, after he is brought in with blunt force trauma.
25–26 April	Robbie	Lachlan Engeler	A young man who turns up late for community service work cleaning out a house. Robbie notices that Justin Morgan seems friendly with their supervisor Constable Cash Newman. He asks Justin to have a word with Cash about going easy on the group, but Justin wants nothing to do with it. He then complains about Cash giving Justin a scheduled break. Robbie later finds some copper wire and asks Justin to store it in his truck for later, but Justin tells him to back off. He then tells Cash to keep an eye on Justin, so he can hide the wire. Justin later sees Robbie take and pocket a watch from an old suitcase. Robbie offers to cut Justin in on a deal with the wire, but Justin tells him he is not interested. Justin then asks Robbie why he is there and tells him to take the hint and not stuff up again. Cash asks Robbie to go and clean up a pile of rubbish, which riles Robbie up and he says he wants to make an official complaint against Cash for bullying and harassment. Justin tells him that if he goes through with it, he will tell the police about the wire and the watch. At the end of the day, Cash gives Robbie the email address for his complaint, but Robbie says that he was just winding him up.
27 April–11 July	Andrew Lawrence	Joshua Hewson	A boy who notices a group of people carrying out community service work nearby and puts a note asking for help in Justin Morgan's rucksack. When Justin returns to the neighbourhood, he locates Andrew's house and finds Andrew passed out on the floor. Andrew is brought to Northern Districts Hospital, where he is combative with the doctor, Bree Cameron, until Justin turns up and assures him that she just wants to help. Bree finds that Andrew is severely dehydrated and undernourished. Justin gets him to open up about his name and age, but Andrew says he should not be talking to him and that he is not allowed to go outside. He refuses to tell anyone who or where his parents are, while insisting that he needs to go home. Andrew is seen by a phycologist, whose assessment says he has issues with his social and educational development. Rather than see Andrew sent to a group home, Justin and his partner Leah Patterson decide to foster him. The police search Andrew's house and find that another man was living with him at some point and they may have been living off the grid for months. When Justin mentions the other man to Andrew, he becomes desperate to go home. Andrew later hears Justin playing his guitar and reveals that he likes music.
16 May–1 June	Margot Dafoe	Mandy McElhinney	A woman claiming to be the mother of Andrew Lawrence, whose father kidnapped him when he was young and then became involved in a doomsday cult. After Andrew leaves with her, the police learn that she is not his mother. Margot takes Andrew to the Vita Nova compound, where she oversees his punishment for talking about the group to outsiders. Justin Morgan and Cash Newman make several attempts to rescue Andrew from the compound, and they are eventually successful after Andrew reports Vita Nova to the police after several members attack and injure Justin. Margot is arrested by the police, with her claims that she and Vita Nova were protecting Andrew from an "apocalypse" being dismissed by everyone as delusional and excuses for her own abusive behaviour towards Andrew, and she is sent to be locked up. The character was credited as Esther Jamieson for two episodes, and Margot Dafoe thereafter.
23 May–19 June	Kate Vella	Ruby Maishman	Jamie Chung's wife and stepmother of his son, Timothy. She comes to Salt to return a cheque that Jamie's colleague Xander Delaney slipped through her door. Xander assures her that it was not charity, but Kate refuses to take the money. They briefly talk about Jamie, before Kate realises that Xander wants her to take the money because he feels guilty that Jamie died.
25 May–13 July	Mercedes Da Silva	Amali Golden	An old friend of Remi Carter, who calls her for help with his band Lyrik, who are entering a battle of the bands competition. Mercedes meets Theo Poulos at the beach and he brings her to see Remi. She meets his girlfriend Bree Cameron while they wait for the rest of the band to show up. Eden Fowler is hostile towards Mercedes when she arrives, which spills over into rehearsal when Eden tells her that she needs to fit in with them, not the other way around. Kirby Aramoana defends Eden, which descends into an argument with Theo and the pair leave. Eden confronts Mercedes and accuses her of having an ulterior motive, before telling her that Lyrik do not need her. Remi follows Mercedes outside, where he points out how well the band sounded and he tells her that he will speak with Eden. Mercedes gives him one hour and he later finds her at the Surf Club, where she is talking with Cash Newman about moving her motorcycle. Remi tells her that he has not sorted things out with Eden, but he needs her to stay. They go up to Salt for a drink and Bree joins Mercedes, who tells her about Remi's days at boarding school. Remi introduces Mercedes to Eden's best friend Felicity Newman, who agrees to let her stay at her place while she is in town. Eden later reveals to Bree that Mercedes tried to steal Remi from Lyrik.
26 June–11 July	Tegan Osbourne	Sophia Forrest	Andrew Lawrence's half-sister, who comes to the Bay to reunite with him. His caregivers Justin Morgan and Leah Patterson are wary of Tegan, after Andrew was kidnapped by a cult. She is able to prove that she is Andrew's sister when she produces a photo of Andrew as a child holding his teddy bear Ted. Tegan tells Justin and Leah that she wants Andrew to come live with her, and assures them that she will make sure he gets any help he needs.
31 July–1 August	Jeremy Holding	James Dyke	A man who drugs and sexually assaults Felicity Newman. He records the assault and later contacts Felicity threatening to release the footage unless she gives him $1000. After Felicity pays him, Jeremy demands $10,000, which Felicity also gives him. He then demands a further $20,000, but Felicity tells him she cannot do a bank transfer, as her husband will get suspicious. Jeremy arranges a time and place for her to drop the money off. As he collects the money, Felicity takes photos of him and his license plate. After realising that the money bag is light, Jeremy tells Felicity he will post the footage online unless she pays up, however, he is soon arrested. When the police search his phone, they find footage of eight other assaults he has committed. Weeks later, Jeremy asks for a meeting with Felicity.
2 August–	Victoria Hudson	Ursula Yovich	Mali Hudson and Elandra Hudson's mother. Mali invites her to meet his girlfriend Rose Delaney. As Victoria takes Rose off to talk, Elandra tells Mali that she is angry with him. Victoria makes it clear that she is not happy that Mali has not told her about Rose, as well as his move to Summer Bay. Over lunch, Victoria tells Rose how Mali got his name, before asking where she is from and what she does for a living. As soon as she learns Rose is a police officer, Victoria gets up to leave and tells Mali that his father would be ashamed of him. Elandra tells Mali to talk to their mother, while explaining to Rose that their brother has been in trouble with the police, leading to racial profiling of the whole family. Mali tells Victoria that he is hurt, but she counters that he keeps lying to her. He asks her to give Rose a chance and Victoria invites Rose to meet the rest of the family soon.
3 August–6 September	Forrest Duke	Elijah Williams	A record label executive, who meets with Kirby Aramoana to discuss a potential solo career away from her band Lyrik. Forrest tells Kirby that she has the writing skills, the smarts and the looks, and thinks her potential is wasted in the band. He explains that if she signs exclusively with him, he will bring her vision to life and she and her music will be the sole focus. Forrest thanks Kirby for meeting with him and gives her some time to think his offer over. Kirby signs with Forrest, who begins organising a press launch. Her former manager Justin Morgan asks Forrest to delay the press release about Kirby going solo, but he refuses, until Kirby talks with him. He then tells Justin that they will delay the press release, but Lyrik can no longer play any song written by Kirby.
21 August–12 September	Detective Madden	Jonny Pasvolsky	The lead detective overseeing Dana Matheson's case. He comes to Yabbie Creek Police Station to see Constable Cash Newman, after learning he has been asking questions about the investigation. Cash tells him that he looked at the warrant and thought it was an interesting case, but some things did not add up and explains his findings. Madden makes a call asking for information on Cash and soon learns that he worked with Dana's sister Harper Matheson. He warns Cash to stop investigating and let him put away Dana, before he gets himself into real trouble. Madden later holds Dana hostage and injects her with a syringe, nearly killing her. Dana quickly pulls through and reveals Madden's actions to Rose, Cash then confronts Madden who tries to use Dana's past to get out of trouble so Cash arrests him.
24–31 August	Samuel Edwards	Bert La Bonté	Rose Delaney's biological father. After realising Samuel is her father, Rose drops off a letter at his house and he gets in contact to arrange a meeting. When Rose asks why he was not a part of her life, Samuel tells her that he did not know she existed. He explains that he had a relationship with her mother Yvette while he was teaching at a university, but she left the university abruptly and he could not find her and she never contacted him again. Rose initially struggles and tells Samuel that she never knew where she came from and always felt different. Samuel shows Rose a family bible and gets her to write her name with the other generations. He tells her she is welcome at his home anytime and asks to see more of her.
6–12 September	Detective Fletcher	James Biasetto	Detective Fletcher meets with Detective Madden to tell him that he has seen nothing while carrying out surveillance on Constable Cash Newman and Irene Roberts. Fletcher later overhears Cash telling Harper Matheson that he is going to the Anti-Corruption Commission about Madden. He then sends Madden a text telling him that they are out of time, so they go to Irene's house to arrest Harper. Her sister Dana Matheson, the suspect they have been actually looking for, comes out of the bedroom and Madden orders Fletcher to cuff her. Madden and Fletcher take Dana to a garage, where she is chained to a chair. Madden leaves Fletcher with Dana, while he goes to establish an alibi. He later texts Fletcher an order to kill Dana and Fletcher unchains Dana, who kicks him and then hits him with a chair. He wakes up just as Dana is calling Harper on his phone and grabs her, before calling Madden. When Madden returns, he insults Fletcher, who tells him that he only went along with the plan because he was promised easy money. Madden tells Fletcher to join in the police search for Dana, while he carries out his plan to kill her with a fentanyl overdose. Fletcher is later caught and arrested.
21 September–10 October	Zara Campbell	Matilda Brown	Mali Hudson's childhood friend. Zara visits Mali in Summer Bay to catch up with him since his departure from Mantaray Point. Xander Delaney initially mistakes her for Mali's sister, before Mali reveals that Zara is his promised wife. It emerges that the pair were once in a relationship, but Zara ended it. Zara stays with Mali at The Farmhouse, and later meets his girlfriend Rose Delaney.
1 November–	Graham Carter	Brian Meegan	Remi Carter's parents. He takes his girlfriend Bree Cameron to meet them for the first time at their house. Bree learns that they are celebrating their 35th wedding anniversary and Graham tells her that they met at The Con when she asks. Nicola takes Bree off for a tour of the grounds, while Graham tells Remi that he is proud of him and the choices he has made. Bree and Remi join his parents for a drink before their party and when Nicola asks Bree how she and Remi met, Bree realises that Remi has not told them that she was married. As she mentions that her husband died, Remi stops her from telling his parents any more.
1 November–	Nicola Carter	Kate Raison	
29 November 2023 – 9 January 2024	Wes	Josh McConville	Two brothers who strike Remi Carter's bike with their car, while arguing over the radio. Wes tries to revive Remi, but believes he is dead, so he and Mickey decide to bury his body. They are interrupted by Eden Fowler and Wes hits her, knocking her unconscious. They tie her up and gag her, before taking her and Remi to an abandoned house. Wes tells Mickey to dispose of Remi's body, but he realises that Remi is still alive. Eden tries to convince them that, as Remi did not see their faces, he cannot identify them and they can take him to the nearest hospital. They agree that Mickey will take him, but he leaves Remi by the side of the road instead, before calling an ambulance. Wes plans to kill Eden to stop her talking, but Constables Cash Newman and Rose Delaney arrive, having found Eden's bracelet in Remi's pocket.
29 November 2023 – 9 January 2024	Mickey	Travis Jeffery	
