= List of Home and Away characters introduced in 2024 =

Home and Away is an Australian television soap opera, which was first broadcast on the Seven Network on 17 January 1988. The following is a list of characters that appear in 2024, by order of first appearance. All characters are introduced by the soap's executive producer, Lucy Addario. The 37th season of Home and Away began airing from 8 January 2024. Valerie Beaumont was introduced at the end of the month, with Stevie Marlow making her first appearance in February. Rory Templeton made his debut in June, followed by Perri Hayes in July. Abigail Fowler and Claudia Salini arrived in August.

== Valerie Beaumont ==
Valerie Beaumont
- Home and Away character
- Portrayed by: Courtney Clarke
- First appearance: 29 January 2024
- Last appearance: 17 April 2024
- Introduced by: Lucy Addario

Valerie Beaumont, played by Courtney Clarke, made her first appearance on 29 January 2024. The character and Clarke's casting details were announced on 15 January 2024. Tahlia Pritchard of Yahoo! Lifestyle reported that the actress would be appearing for a short guest stint. Of filming, Clarke commented "I remember having no idea how the ship ran because it's such a longstanding show, there are all sorts of things regarding how they shoot." Clarke also said that she thought her character would be "a great challenge to play". She praised Ada Nicodemou for helping her feel comfortable and relaxed on set. Details of Clarke's character were not immediately released, but it was confirmed that Clarke had been working closely with Nicodemou, James Stewart and Matt Evans, who play Leah Patterson, Justin Morgan and Theo Poulos respectively. Pritchard wrote that some fans had speculated that Valerie might be someone Leah met in the mental health clinic, where she recently stayed. In the 3–9 February 2024 issue of TV Week, Tamara Cullen confirmed the theory was true, and Valerie was a friend Leah had made while she was staying at the clinic. Valerie wants to help Leah settle back into the Bay, having got to know her and her state of mind. Nicodemou stated "She was Leah's roommate and best friend in the clinic, so she really relies on her for support in a way others can't." Valerie encourages Leah to invite her partner Justin out to dinner when she returns home.

Clarke later explained that Valerie's friendship with Leah was "a big aspect" of the character's journey. She also confirmed that Valerie would make "a few unsuspecting waves in the community over some different issues", however, she does not have negative intentions. Clarke told Melenie Parkes of Stuff that she tried to play Valerie as empathetic as she could. She also told Parkes that Valerie has a "traumatic" backstory, which she undertook research into to understand it. She stated: "Her past experience is something that I would consider to be incredibly rare, which is kind of what makes it unique and very interesting to play. But definitely not anything that I have lived myself and so it was a great challenge to figure out how I would embody that." Clarke's blonde hair was dyed red for the character, as she knew the producers wanted Valerie to have a "dark" image. She also said Valerie dresses "in a very strong way and certainly isn't of the Summer Bay mentality". Clarke added that Valerie would also have a romance with an existing character. Valerie and Theo (Evans) establish a relationship, but Valerie soon gets him addicted to drugs. She eventually leaves town, after Theo and his band are arrested for possession when the police find Valerie's stash in their van.

== Stevie Marlow ==
Stevie Marlow
- Home and Away character
- Portrayed by: Catherine Văn-Davies
- First appearance: 29 February 2024
- Last appearance: 28 May 2024
- Introduced by: Lucy Addario
In-universe information
- Occupation: Actress

Stevie Marlow, played by Catherine Văn-Davies, made her first appearance on 29 February 2024. Stevie is a film actress and was introduced as part of a new storyline for series regular Cash Newman (Nicholas Cartwright), who becomes her bodyguard after he loses his police job. She also becomes a love interest for Remi Carter (Adam Rowland). Văn-Davies explained that Stevie and Cash are "the perfect odd couple", but Remi was a "more compatible option". She continued: "So much of Stevie's image, career and – thanks to her stalker – life is so strictly controlled, she sees the potential for freedom: a chance to be herself with Remi and not just a 'star'." The character becomes part of a "love square" when Remi's former girlfriend Bree Cameron (Juliet Godwin) begins a relationship with Stevie's director and former boyfriend Nelson Giles (Mahesh Jadu). As part of a cross promotion between Home and Away and Sunrise, host Matt Shirvington filmed a cameo appearance in which he interviews Stevie about her new film All Our Tomorrows. Văn-Davies said the interview is "a really affirming sign that Stevie's career, life and creative choices are all pointing firmly in the right direction." She felt that if Stevie is able to promote the film well, she will be closer to the freedom and security that she dreams of, however, her ordeal with her stalker has led to Stevie feeling less confident and there is a possibly that it could ruin her "big moment."

Stevie's storyline comes to an end during the episode broadcast on 28 May 2024, as she is shot and killed by her stalker Sidney Wickham (Joshua McElroy). After the character was killed-off, Daniel Kilkelly of Digital Spy speculated "that show bosses always had the plot twist in mind as part of a tragic year of storylines they had planned for poor old Cash." Of Stevie's arrival in the Bay, a Western Daily Press reporter quipped "One can only assume that, as an actor, Stevie commands every scene she is in – she certainly has presence in Summer Bay." They also observed her "impact" on Remi and how she demanded Nelson's attention on their film, leading them to state "Is Stevie intent on monopolising every man Bree knows?"

Stevie hires Cash Newman (Cartwright) to be her security guard after her former co-star is killed by a stalker, who is now targeting her. The stalker breaks into her house and takes photos of her while she is asleep. While interviewing Cash on her boat, Stevie shows him a police file containing details of her stalker. Cash advises her to cancel any upcoming personal appearances, but Stevie refuses to take his advice. He tells he cannot help her if she is not willing to make sacrifices for her personal safety. However, Cash later takes the job, despite he and Stevie clashing several times. He even invites her to move in with him in an effort to protect her. While she is in Summer Bay, Stevie meets and dates Remi Carter (Rowland). Stevie fires Cash as her bodyguard and believes she is safe enough to attend a promotional event for her upcoming film. However, Sidney Wickham (McElroy) lunges at her and Cash, who has turned up to protect Stevie, gives chase. Sidney is arrested for stalking and Stevie believes the ordeal is over. She decides to move the production of her new film and its crew, including director Nelson Giles (Jadu), to Summer Bay. Nelson dates Remi's former girlfriend Bree Cameron (Godwin). Cash learns Sidney has left remand and he tries to get to Stevie, who is filming on the beach. Sidney shoots Stevie, who collapses into Cash's arms. She is rushed to hospital, where Bree and Levi Fowler (Tristan Gorey) try to save her, but she dies of her injuries.

== Rory Templeton ==
Rory Templeton
- Home and Away character
- Portrayed by: Joshua Orpin
- First appearance: 27 June 2024
- Last appearance: 31 July 2024
- Introduced by: Lucy Addario

Rory Templeton, played by Joshua Orpin, made his first appearance on 27 June 2024. Orpin's casting was announced on 3 March 2024, while his character's details were confirmed on 24 June. Orpin, who had been based in North America, called the role "the perfect opportunity" as he was keen to work in Australian productions. He explained: "One of the reasons I was keen to do this gig was because of that, I have worked internationally and I have been quite homesick, especially over Covid where I wasn't able to come back to Australia even when I wasn't working." Orpin had to get used to the serial's fast filming pace, which he described as "incredibly fun" and "an adjustment for someone who hasn't worked in this style of TV before". He also felt that the pace improved his acting skills. Details about Orpin's character were initially withheld, but Jonathon Moran of The Daily Telegraph reported that Orpin would be playing a new "bad boy". Orpin told him that his character "stirs up some trouble among the Summer Bay locals. He is seemingly one thing on the surface but he has a great depth to him that I’ve had a lot of fun exploring."

Shortly before his debut, it was confirmed that Orpin's character Rory was a member of the show's River Boys surf gang. Along with Dingo (JK Kazzi), Rory comes to the aid of Mali Hudson (Kyle Shilling), whose brother Iluka Hudson (Dion Williams) is in trouble with the Allen gang. Orpin, who is from Melbourne, admitted that unlike his character, he was not "a surfer who frequents the beach", and joked that there was "some fake tan going on." Orpin told TV Week's Wade Sellers that being part of the River Boys came with a "preconceived notion" about who Rory is because of the gang's reputation, but his character's story would explore "love and loyalty and how far that loyalty extends." The character was later confirmed to be a new love interest for Felicity Newman (Jacqui Purvis). During the episode broadcast on 31 July 2024, Rory is arrested for murdering a Mangrove River police officer. Orpin then confirmed on social media that his guest stint had ended, stating: "Tonight we say goodbye to Rory as he departs Summer Bay for greener pastures... And by greener pastures, I mean the oppressive concrete pastures of a tiny prison cell. I'd be lying if I said he doesn't entirely deserve it! Nonetheless, I hope you've enjoyed having him around these past few weeks."

== Perri Hayes ==
Perri Hayes, played by Cantona Stewart, made his first appearance on 10 July 2024. The character and Stewart's casting was announced on 1 July 2024. Iona Rowan of Digital Spy confirmed Stewart had wrapped his six month guest stint shortly before his casting announcement. Perri was initially billed as a "troubled teen" who comes to Summer Bay to join Tane Parata's (Ethan Browne) new youth programme aimed at helping teenagers "who have been in trouble with the law." Kellie Balaam of The Sunday Times reported that Tane would take Perri, described as a "vulnerable but confident street-wise kid", under his wing. Like Browne, Stewart is of Māori descent and he hoped that Māori viewers would be able to relate to his character, especially as he missed out on being immersed in the Māori culture due to being born in the UK and raised on the Gold Coast in Queensland. He explained: "Growing up playing rugby league, and going to school, there are so many people from NZ and Pacific Islands who grew up here. They're in a sense like myself, they missed out on the day ins and day outs of what our culture provides at school, in a household, in sporting arenas and for me to be able to bring that to the screen and present that week to week in a storyline, I think has so much power." He added that Tane helps guide his character, as Perri has the culture from his mother, but has been unable to experience it first-hand.

== Abigail Fowler ==
Abigail Fowler
- Home and Away character
- Portrayed by: Hailey Pinto
- Duration: 2024–present
- First appearance: 8 August 2024
- Introduced by: Lucy Addario
In-universe information
- Occupation: Bartender
- Father: James Fowler
- Mother: Debra Fowler
- Brothers: Levi Fowler
- Sisters: Eden Fowler

Abigail "Abby" Fowler, played by Hailey Pinto, made her first appearance on 8 August 2024. The character had previously been mentioned on-screen, but Pinto's casting was confirmed in June 2024 when she was seen filming at Palm Beach, the serial's exterior filming location. Abigail is the fourth member of the Fowler family to be introduced since her older sister Eden Fowler (Stephanie Panozzo) debuted in 2022. Further details about the character and Pinto's casting were released on 24 July. Georgia Clelland of The Courier-Mail reported that Abigail was Pinto's "first major acting role". She secured the role in 2023, three months after she signed to an acting agency, explaining "It's all happened really quickly, I got my agent in late November, then the audition came through in February. I then got a callback, and just two days later, I got a call saying that I booked it."

Clelland said Abigail would bring "plenty of drama" to the show, and Pinto described her as "very energetic, sassy, headstrong and a bit stubborn." She also said that Abigail would arrive with "a lot of her own kind of personal demons". Pinto undertook "a lot of research" before filming in order to portray Abigail with care and honesty. The character is introduced during Eden and Cash Newman's (Nicholas Cartwright) surprise engagement party. Eden is happy to see her sister, but soon notices that all is not well with Abigail, who is agitated, has a darkness around her eyes, and receives constant messages on her phone. For her portrayal of Abigail, Pinto received a nomination for the Logie Award for Most Popular New Talent in 2025.

== Claudia Salini ==
Claudia Salini, played by Rachael Carpani, made her first appearance on 29 August 2024. Carpani's casting and character details were confirmed on 18 August. She was attracted to the role after learning the character was created by the show's script executive Louise Bowes, who previously worked as a scriptwriter on McLeod's Daughters which Carpani starred in from 2001 until 2007. Carpani commented: "she makes it far more real. I know we're talking about a fun soap here where people get kidnapped and people blow things up and crazy things happen, but there was a realness to this character." Claudia was billed as "a newcomer to Summer Bay who makes waves in the Morgan household." Later details released in TV Week described Claudia as "a no-nonsense businesswoman" who becomes stuck in Summer Bay following a car accident. Claudia blames Justin Morgan (James Stewart) and Theo Poulos (Matt Evans) for the crash as they recently serviced the car. She claims that the brakes were faulty, so she is going to sue Justin for negligence. Carpani stated "Claudia's anger towards Justin and Theo isn't personal. I'd say it's quite justified given her arm is broken and stuck in a cast for six weeks."

== Others ==
Date(s)	Character	Actor	Circumstances
8 January	Sabrina	Harriet Gordon-Anderson	The SES leader, who leads the search for Eden Fowler at Crystal Gorge after being called in by Cash Newman. Sabrina asks Cash for all the information he can give to her about Eden, including how long she has been missing and what she was wearing. Sabrina assigns two teams to look for Eden. Cash spots fresh tire tracks and freshly dug soil, but he tells Sabrina that he did not hear any vehicle. Sabrina tells him the most likely explanation is that Eden got disorientated in the dark and fell. After going over the search area twice, Sabrina asks Cash whether Eden changed her mind and got a lift home. Felicity Newman assures her that Eden would not do that. Sabrina orders the teams to go again and later brings them in for a break.
15 January	ICU Nurse	Louis Henbest	The nurse checks on Remi Carter, as Bree Cameron watches on. When Remi wakes from the sedation, Bree tells the nurse to get ready for extubation. When Remi complain of pain in his chest, the nurse tells Bree that he is written up for morphine and she tells him to get it. Later that day, the nurse goes to move Remi to the main ward, telling Bree that he is no longer an intensive care patient. She tries to stop him, but he tells her that he is just following instructions. He points out that she is not Remi's doctor and that Levi Fowler downgraded him.
19 February	Montana Kennedy	Millie Ford	An influencer who records Rose Delaney and Mali Hudson arguing outside the Surf Club, before turning up late to her community service group, which is being supervised by Rose. Montana is reluctant to join in with the bush rejuvenation or wear the Hi-Vis vest. Rose later has to tell her to get back to work when she tries to take a break early. She also annoys the rest of the group, including Justin Morgan, when she tries to get out of working. Rose tells Montana that she will not sign off on her hours. When Rose asks her why she is there, Montana explains that she stole a handbag for a video. Rose tells her that she could be in jail instead, so she should do the work, earn respect and make it mean something. Rose later catches Montana making a positive video about her community service.
20 February–25 April	Imogen Fowler	Georgia Blizzard	Levi Fowler's wife, who meets his sister Eden Fowler when she comes to their house unannounced. Imogen tells Levi and Eden that she is pleased they have reconnected. During dinner, Levi and Imogen tell Eden how they met and their plans for a family. The following morning, Imogen asks Eden if she wants to go shopping with her, but Eden tells her and Levi that she should get back to Summer Bay to check on her boyfriend, who is starting a new job.
22 February–11 April	Baby Maia/Poppy Rickard	Various	A baby that Tane Parata finds on the beach in a gym bag. Tane spends time with the baby in the hospital and he later nicknames her Maia, which means "courage" in the Mäori language. Shortly before the baby is placed with a foster family, her mother Sonia Rickard comes forward and reveals that her name is Poppy. Tane later takes Poppy from the hospital, but soon brings her back and she is reunited with Sonia.
4–11 April	Sonia Rickard	Olivia Beardsley	Poppy Rickard's mother, who left her in a gym bag on the beach. Weeks later, she returns to claim Poppy, however, she learns that Tane Parata has taken her. Tane later returns Poppy to Sonia.
4 April–	Officer Reynolds	Drew Wilson	A police constable, who carries out a search of the farmhouse with Rose Delaney, after Tane Parata takes Poppy Rickard from the hospital. Weeks later, he attends the scene of a fight between Mali Hudson and Gordie Allen. He searches Nat Allen and alerts Rose to the fact he found a knife in her pocket, before arresting her.
10 April–	Sergeant Callan	Grant Lyndon	The most senior officer at Yabbie Creek Police Station. He asks Rose Delaney why Sonia Rickard has not been told that her infant daughter has been taken by Tane Parata, but Rose tells him that she is waiting on DNA results to come back first. Callan tells her that he has spoken with Sonia and wants Tane's photo on the news. He later learns that Rose's boyfriend lives with Tane and questions whether she has been dragging out the investigation in order to help Tane. Rose denies it, but Callan decides to take over the case and holds a press conference asking for help in finding Tane.
17 April–6 June	Nelson Giles	Mahesh Jadu	A film director working with Stevie Marlow. She brings him and the rest of the crew to Summer Bay to shoot her new film. Nelson spots Bree Cameron on the beach, and later buys her coffee at the Diner, before getting to know her. They begin dating and end up on a double date with Stevie and Bree's former boyfriend Remi Carter. Stevie is shot and killed during filming. Nelson quits the production and later tells Bree that he is going to Naples to direct a new project, before asking her to come with him. Bree tells Nelson that she still has feelings for Remi and that they kissed. However, Nelson still wants her to come with him, but Bree turns him down and they part as friends.
17 April–29 May	Sidney Wickham	Joshua McElroy	Stevie Marlow's stalker, who has been sending death threats to her. He joins a crowd of fans at a promotional event and asks Stevie to say her catch phrase, before lunging at her. Stevie's bodyguard Cash Newman realises that Sidney is the stalker and chases him to a nearby car park. Sidney tries to attack Cash and tells him that Stevie is the last on his list. The police arrest him and he tells Stevie that it is not over. Weeks later, Cash is informed that Sidney is no longer on remand. Sidney goes to Summer Bay, where Stevie is filming her new movie. He shoots Stevie, who later dies in hospital, and tries to leave the area when Tane Parata spots him. Tane chases him, but Sidney hits him with the gun, leaving him unconscious. When Cash returns to his house, Sidney is waiting inside with the gun. He wants to know that Stevie is dead, but refuses to believe Cash when he confirms that she is. He demands proof because the news outlets are not reporting on it due to a media blackout. Cash's girlfriend Eden Fowler suddenly arrives home, distracting Sidney enough for Cash to tackle and subdue him. Eden calls the police, who arrest Sidney for Stevie's murder. Rose Delaney later confirms that he will be going away for a long time.
5 June–2 July	Iluka Hudson	Dion Williams	Mali Hudson's brother. After he arrives in Summer Bay, it is quickly revealed that he has stolen $8000 from the Allens, a local criminal family. Nat Allen and her brothers break into the Farmhouse and ransack the place, leading to a hostage situation with Mackenzie Booth, Levi Fowler and the Hudson brothers. Levi is stabbed in the melee and Iluka is taken hostage and beaten savagely. He is found on the roadside by Theo Poulos and taken to hospital. Iluka discharges himself in the middle of the night and sleeps on the beach where Mali finds him. Iluka leaves after Mackenzie tells him he is no longer welcome and he returns to Mantaray Point.
10 June–9 July	Bronte Langford	Stefanie Caccamo	A young woman who befriends Irene Roberts at the hospital. Irene brings her to stay at her house in Summer Bay. Bronte makes a secret phone call, telling the person on the other end that Irene is a pushover. Bronte tells Irene and her friends that she has terminal cancer and a fundraiser is set up. Dana Matheson, Irene's boarder, is sceptical of Bronte's illness and confronts her. Dana is then accused of bullying Bronte. When Dana closes in on the truth, Bronte has her associate, Chase, kidnap her and lock her in a shipping container in the bush. Dana manages to escape and is rescued by Xander Delaney and John Palmer, while Rose Delaney tackles and arrests Bronte and Chase. Bronte initially remains confident she will get away with her crime, while taunting Dana by saying that no one believed her, only for Irene to then confront Bronte at the station and denounce her for her lies. Now knowing there's no chance of her getting away with her actions, Bronte spitefully tells Irene to blame herself for being gullible before being taken into custody. It is later revealed that the money Bronte stole has been returned, though Irene turns to alcoholism out of immense guilt over initially believing Bronte's lies.
20–27 June	Nat Allen	Claire Lovering	After Iluka Hudson steals $8,000 from the Allens, they come to Summer Bay looking for him. Nat overhears Mackenzie Booth and Levi Fowler talking about Iluka's brother Mali Hudson and pretends that she is buying a surfboard from him. Mack gives her their address so she can pick it up. Nat meets up with Gordie and Campbell and they ransack the house while they wait for Iluka and Mali. Mack and Levi arrive home and are held at knifepoint by Campbell, as Nat explains that they are waiting for the Hudson brothers, while Campbell says that Iluka owes them. Mali comes home and tries to free a tied up Mack. He tells Nat and Gordie to release her and he will talk. As Mali says that he was going to get them the money, Levi breaks free of duct tape and tackles Campbell, while Gordie stops Mack from leaving. Nat orders Campbell to stop fighting Levi, who they soon realise has been stabbed in the struggle. Nat refuses to let Mack call an ambulance. Iluka is then taken hostage by the Allens and is savagely beaten by them, leading to his hospitalisation after they dump him in the bush. Mali calls in Dean Thompson's River Boy associates Dingo and Rory Templeton for help. Mali challenges Gordie to a one-on-one fight and he agrees. When Mali gains the upper hand, Nat secretly draws a knife and is ready to use it. Rory and Dingo are ready to stop her but the police arrive, break up the fight and arrest Mali and the Allens.
20–27 June	Gordie Allen	Brandon McClelland	
20–27 June	Campbell Allen	John Harding	
27 June–30 July	David 'Dingo' Lewis	JK Kazzi	A member of the River Boys gang, who, along with Rory Templeton, comes to Mali Hudson's aid.
18 July 2024, 25 June 2025–	James "Jimmy" Fowler	Aaron Jeffery	Eden Fowler and Levi Fowler's father. He became estranged from Eden after he had an affair and Levi moved in with him, while she stayed with their mother, Debra Fowler. After learning that Levi's marriage to Imogen Fowler is over, Jimmy comes to visit him in Summer Bay. Levi tells him about his new relationship with Mackenzie Booth, before asking how he copes knowing he hurt someone so badly. Jimmy advises Levi to let the pain and hurt go and move on, or it could ruin his relationship with Mackenzie. While walking along the beach, Jimmy meets Eden's friend Kirby Aramoana and learns that Eden is also living in the Bay. Kirby realises that Levi did not tell Jimmy. After learning that Jimmy knows about Eden, Levi tells him that she might be working at Salt that night. Levi explains that he and Eden had almost reconciled when his marriage ended due to his affair. Jimmy meets Eden's boyfriend Cash Newman and apologises for causing her more hurt. Levi and Jimmy continue talking about Eden, and Jimmy hopes that she is happy. Eden turns up and she asks Jimmy to leave. Jimmy tells her that he loves her, but she accuses him of destroying their family and says that she never wants to see him again. Jimmy agrees to leave in the morning. Levi tries to get him to stay, but Jimmy tells him that he does not want to cause Eden anymore distress. They both hope that Eden will get past her anger and forgive them one day. The following year, Eden invites Jimmy to the Bay for a barbeque after getting engaged to Cash. He meets Levi's partner Mackenzie and his youngest daughter, Abigail Fowler's partner Mali Hudson. Eden grows uncomfortable with his presence and when he says how grateful he is that she has forgiven him, Eden leaves the party. Jimmy acknowledges that it was never going to be easy for her. Jimmy finds Eden to try and work things out between them. Eden reveals that she asked him to come to the Bay to test whether she could stand to invite him to her wedding, but she cannot be in the same room as him. Jimmy tells her that everyone else has forgiven him, but he acknowledges that he has broken something between them. He tells her that he does not want to hurt her anymore and wishes her well. He asks Cash to send him a photo of Eden in her wedding dress, but Eden interrupts and says that she does not know how to stop being angry with him. He admits that he should have fought harder to stay in her and Abigail's lives. Jimmy gives Eden a necklace that belonged to her grandmother. During dinner with Levi and Abigail, Jimmy admits that he made more progress with Eden that day than he has in years. Jimmy later attends Cash and Eden's wedding.
21 August–25 September	Carl Hayes	Matthew Holmes	Perri Hayes's father. He tracks his son down to Summer Bay Fit and asks for his help with a job, telling him that family comes first. They are interrupted by gym owner Tane Parata, who tells Carl to leave and not come back. Tane follows Carl outside and tells him to stay away from Perri, as he does not deserve him. Carl tries to order Perri to go with him, but he stays with Tane. Carl later looks up Tane online and discovers that he is currently on a suspended prison sentence. Carl is then issued with an AVO but defies it and continues to harass Perri. He corners Perri at Tane's house and threatens to drown him in the pool if he does not comply with his demands. There is a struggle and Carl drowns as a result of Perri acting in self-defence. Perri is then tried and found not guilty.
29 August	Dom	Danny Ball	Abigail Fowler's drug dealer. After Abigail comes down from getting high, she asks Dom if she can stay with him as she wants another hit. However, she admits she is out of money and Dom assures her they can work something out. When Abigail attempts to leave the following day, Dom tells her that she owes him and that she can pay off her debt by having sex with one of his regular clients. Dom later answers the door to Levi Fowler and denies knowing Abigail. He then forces Abigail into a bedroom, where he orders her to put on the outfit laid out on the bed. Levi and Eden Fowler return after learning what is going on inside the house and Levi breaks the door down. Levi pins Dom up against the wall, while Eden leads Abigail out.
19–26 September	Michelle Bowden	Mercy Cornwall	The recipient of Felicity Newman's heart and lungs. She meets with Felicity's brother Cash Newman to thank him for donating Felicity's organs. He shows her photos of his sister and Michelle tells him how bad her condition was before the transplant. She realises that Cash is looking for something that reminds him of Felicity, but tells him that she is just herself. They go for a walk on the beach and upon returning to the house, Eden Fowler shows up to meet Michelle, but Cash tells both of them that it is not a good idea. Michelle insists that she wants to meet Felicity's best friend and Cash introduces them. Cash later takes Michelle to visit his and Felicity's foster father and her grave. Upon their return, Cash invites Michelle to stay with him for another night, but after speaking with Eden, she decides to stay at a motel. She later tells Cash that it is time she left and started living her life. She thanks him again and they say goodbye.
24 September	Eric Salini	Cameron Pascoe	Claudia Salini's husband, who meets with Leah Patterson to inform her that her husband Justin Morgan is having an affair with his wife. Leah and Theo Poulos scoff at the accusation and tell Eric that Justin is just driving Claudia around because of her broken arm. Eric tells them that he has asked Claudia to leave their home. Claudia later tells Justin and Leah that Eric has accused her of having affairs before, but she has never cheated on him.
2–17 October 2024, 12–18 February 2026	Jane Lazzari	Charlotte Friels	A lawyer, who Tane Parata hires to represent Perri Hayes. A couple of years later, she represents Tane when he is charged with possession of drugs with intent to sell. During his interview, she urges him not to answer David Langham's questions and warns Tane not to talk to any officers without her present. Jane manages to secure Tane bail. A day later, Tane calls Jane to meet him at the station when David wants to question him about a phone number he called in the lead up to his arrest. Jane makes sure that David got the records with a warrant and points out that Tane had no prior knowledge of the drugs found in his house. After showing Tane some texts, Jane stops the interview and asks Tane to look her in the eye and tell her that he is not guilty, which he does. Tane is able to explain that the texts are to his gym supplement seller. After he is given a court date, Jane advises Tane to plead guilty, however, when he refuses, she quits the case.
3 October 2024–6 February 2025	Tim Russell	George Pullar	Abigail Fowler's therapist, who begins a relationship with her older sister Eden Fowler.
17–18 October	Magistrate	Hannah Waterman	The magistrate presides over Perri Hayes's trial for the murder of his father Carl Hayes.
17–24 October	Kaia Hayes	Akina Edmonds	Perri Hayes's mother, who he had believed to be dead. She is called as a surprise witness at his trial for the murder of his father, Carl Hayes. She testifies that Carl threatened to kill Perri unless she left their home. This persuades the jury to find Perri not guilty. Perri tells Kaia to return to New Zealand as he finds it hard to forgive her for abandoning him. They later sit down to talk and Kaia reveals that she returned to see Perri play basketball and believed he was happy. Perri grows angry with Kaia and she plans to leave, until he invites her to dinner with Tane Parata and Harper Matheson. He thanks her for helping him in court and later decides to leave the Bay with her.
11 November 2024–6 February 2025	Nerida Mullins	Ellie Gall	One of Tim Russell's former patients.
14 November 2024 – 15 January 2025	Dr Liz Shaw	Mandy Bishop	Dr Shaw treats Harper Matheson after she begins experiencing contractions following surgery on her baby. She tells Harper that the contractions are ten minutes apart, but they have administered medication to stop them. When she returns to check on Harper, Levi Fowler asks if they can administer another dose and she agrees. She also tells Levi that if it does not slow the contractions, they will have to deliver the baby, but Harper will not be able to give birth naturally due to the abdominal surgery. Dr Shaw later tells Harper and Tane Parata that the contractions have stopped and Harper can be moved to a ward.
