= Episode 8000 (Home and Away) =

- Home and Away episode
- Episode no.: Season 36; Episode 8000
- Directed by: Arnie Custo
- Written by: Louise Bowes
- Original air date: 27 March 2023
- Running time: 22 minutes

Guest appearances
- Michelle Morunga as the Kaikaranga; Celeste Thompson as Maori Poi Performer; Mina Martin as Maori Poi Performer; Riana Cooper as Maori Poi Performer; Miritana Hughes as Tui

Episode chronology
← Previous; Episode 7999	Next → Episode 8001

Episode 8000 of the Australian television soap opera Home and Away was first broadcast on Seven Network on 27 March 2023. The episode was written by Louise Bowes and directed by Arnie Custo. The plot mainly focuses on the wedding between Tane Parata (Ethan Browne) and Felicity Newman (Jacqui Purvis). It also briefly touches on the topic of abortion, as Bree Cameron (Juliet Godwin) terminates her pregnancy with the support of Remi Carter (Adam Rowland). The end of the episode begins a new storyline for Felicity's brother Cash Newman (Nicholas Cartwright), as he believes he has proposed to his girlfriend Eden Fowler (Stephanie Panozzo) while drunk.

The episode coincided with two weeks of "blockbuster" storylines for the show. Actress Ada Nicodemou (who plays Leah Patterson) praised the decision to make Tane and Felicity's wedding the focus of the 8000th episode, describing it as "a nice payoff for the audience." She also thought that it was important for the show to focus on sensitive issues like abortion, as it would start discussions and also help viewers in similar situations. Despite being told by the scriptwriters that the characters would get their happy ending, Purvis admitted that she still had some doubts that Tane and Felicity would marry right up until filming. She found that the set had a different feeling about it, as everyone involved seemed to know that they were creating something exciting. The wedding scenes were filmed at a faster pace than normal because of incoming bad weather, which only allowed for a few takes in which to get everything right.

The ceremony incorporates several Māori traditions, as Tane is from New Zealand. Purvis performed her character's vows in te reo Māori, which she found to be one of the hardest things she has ever had to do. She worked with a dialect coach in order to get the language right, as she did not want to disrespect the Māori culture. Due to the incoming rain, Purvis had limited time to get the vows right and she admittedly made some mistakes during the first take. Members of the Sydney Māori community were asked to help make the wedding as authentically New Zealand as possible, while Browne worked with the scriptwriters to include some personal touches, such as the wearing of traditional Korowai cloaks. Critics called Episode 8000 "unmissable" and a "landmark episode". Many pointed out that the wedding was long-awaited, while Georgie Kearney from 7News said it would "go down in Summer Bay history." The editor of TV Week branded Felicity and Tane's nuptials "the TV wedding of the year".

== Plot ==
Lyrik band members Kirby Aramoana (Angelina Thomson) and Theo Poulos (Matt Evans) return to Summer Bay early from their trip, upon learning that Tane Parata (Ethan Browne) and Felicity Newman (Jacqui Purvis) are getting married that day and the band have been asked to play at the reception. Fellow band member Eden Fowler (Stephanie Panozzo) tells them that their guitarist Remi Carter (Adam Rowland) cannot join them, but not why. Tane is helping to set up the reception at local restaurant Salt and he receives the wedding cake from Marilyn Chambers (Emily Symons). Eden helps Felicity to choose a dress from her wardrobe and she finds the engagement ring Felicity's brother Cash Newman (Nicholas Cartwright) bought for his former girlfriend. Remi takes Bree Cameron (Juliet Godwin) to the hospital, where she is due to have an abortion. Felicity finds the perfect dress and Cash arrives to take her and Eden to the forest, where Tane is waiting with a kaikaranga, poi dancers and the celebrant. Felicity says her vows in te reo Māori and Tane wraps her in a Korowai. They exchange rings and are pronounced husband and wife.

Back in the Bay, Remi brings Bree home and she tells him that she has no regrets. He offers to stay with her, but she encourages him to go to Salt to be with his friends. She assures him that she will be okay and they share a kiss. Remi makes it to Salt shortly before Tane and Felicity arrive. Felicity is surprised to see a photo collage of their friends and family, which Tane organised as a surprise for her. Lyrik perform the couple's favourite song and they share their first dance. Felicity later goes out to the balcony to invite everyone on the beach to the reception. Tane makes a joke to Cash about how he and Eden will be the next couple to marry, which briefly scares Cash. Tane and Felicity reveal that they are going to New Zealand on honeymoon, before Felicity goes to help the bar staff with the influx of guests. Cash tells Eden that he is happy for Felicity. The next morning, Cash wakes up to see Eden wearing his engagement ring and he assumes he drunkenly proposed to her.

== Production ==
In March 2023, Home and Away released a trailer to promote two weeks of "blockbuster" storylines, in which the serial's 8,000th episode would coincide. The trailer confirmed that popular couple Tane Parata (Ethan Browne) and Felicity Newman (Jacqui Purvis) would finally marry during the episode, after their first ceremony was cancelled following a car accident in the 2022 season finale. In an interview with Anita Anabel of Mediaweek, actress Ada Nicodemou, who plays Leah Patterson in the serial, praised the decision to make the wedding the focus of the 8000th episode. She said "It's a great episode. It's a wedding and I think everyone loves a wedding. We like to see some happy endings... I think it's just perfect. I think it's a nice payoff for the audience. And to see 8000 episodes, I think it's nice to celebrate it like that." Nicodemou also commended the show for its celebration of cultural diversity as the wedding incorporates several Māori traditions. She thought it was "really interesting" to see how a Māori wedding is conducted and pointed out that there would still be a bit of drama.

Purvis told Tamara Cullen of TV Week that after all Tane and Felicity have been through with the car crash, break-up and Felicity's reliance on alcohol, the couple just want a simple wedding and to be married. When the show's scriptwriters informed Purvis that Tane and Felicity would finally get "their happy ending" following their first wedding attempt, she had doubts about it happening until they shot Episode 8000. She said "There's always that thing on this job. You don't believe it until you're filming because anything can happen. They can change the script last minute. They do and you get thrown a new script to learn at 7am." Purvis praised the writers for including as many aspects of the Māori culture in the script as possible. The writers also had Tane and Felicity declare that they did not want any guests at the wedding to excuse the absence of departed family members. Purvis found the set to have a different feeling about it than usual and she explained that everyone seemed to know that they were creating something interesting and exciting. The wedding was filmed at a faster pace than normal because of incoming bad weather. Purvis said that she and Browne only had a couple of takes in which to get the ceremony right, but thought it was "incredible" to be part of it.

Purvis performed her character's vows in te reo Māori (the Māori language). She began learning the previous year for the failed wedding with the help of a cultural adviser and co-stars Browne and Kawakawa Fox-Reo, who plays Tane's nephew Nikau Parata. Purvis told Kerry Harvey of Stuff that she made the producers hire a dialect coach, as she did not want to get it wrong and disrespect the Māori culture. Purvis and the coach worked together at the weekends and during any spare time she had. Fox-Reo also recorded himself reciting Felicity's vows to aid Purvis, who would then record herself saying them before sending the clips to Browne to check. Purvis said that learning the language took numerous hours, however, she was also grateful for the chance. She described reciting the vows in te reo Māori as "one of the hardest things I've ever had to do." Because of the incoming rain, Purvis had very few takes to get the vows right. She admitted that she made several mistakes during the first take, but everything went well during the second. Purvis stated "It'll be a moment I'll probably never forget. It was very spiritual and so beautiful to be a part of it."

Members of the Sydney Māori community were asked to help with the wedding ceremony to make it as authentically New Zealand as possible. Browne, who is from Wairoa, was "delighted" that the Maori culture played a central role in the episode. He stated "I'm so grateful to be able to share my culture on a platform like Home And Away. It's important to learn about different cultures and the way they live their life, and to be able to do that with my culture outside of New Zealand is truly special." The actor felt some pressure to get the Māori customs right and worked with the scriptwriters to include some "personal touches". Traditional Māori wedding elements included a kaikaranga (a female caller who welcomes the guests) and poi dancers. Tane and Felicity also wear traditional Korowai cloaks during the ceremony, which Browne said was a symbol of unity between the bride and groom, their family and ancestors. Purvis also enjoyed trying on the various wedding dresses to find the right one for her character, and likened it to a rehearsal for her own future wedding.

In addition to the wedding, the episode also briefly focuses on the topic of abortion, as Bree Cameron (Juliet Godwin) decides to terminate her pregnancy. Anabel (Mediaweek) observed that the subject had been "taboo" on television for years, and Nicodemou believed that it was important to show it in order to start "familial discussions". She thought that tacking sensitive issues like abortion was why Home and Away had succeeded over the years, adding that it could also help viewers who are in similar situations. The end of the episode begins a new storyline for Cash Newman (Nicholas Cartwright) and Eden Fowler (Stephanie Panozzo), as Cash believes he has proposed to Eden while he was drunk. This tests the strength of their relationship as they realise Cash is not ready for that level of commitment.

== Reception ==
The original broadcast of Episode 8000 was watched by 512,000 viewers, making it the tenth most watched program on Australian television and third most watched program on the Seven Network for 27 March.

Georgie Kearney from 7News dubbed the episode "unmissable" and wrote "Beloved Channel 7 drama Home and Away is celebrating 8,000 episodes – in the best way possible. A wedding is coming to Summer Bay!" She called the ceremony "emotional", "beautiful" and "picturesque", adding that it was "a special wedding set to go down in Summer Bay history." Mediaweek's Anita Anabel commented that the wedding was "highly-anticipated" and dubbed it a "landmark episode". Andrei Harmsworth of The West Australian stated Felicity and Tane's "long-awaited will-they-or-won't-they-wedding [....] will steal the thunder as the show chalks up its 8000th episode of melodrama".

A critic for Women's Day thought there was "bound to be fireworks" as the show celebrated its 8000th episode and also called it unmissable. They noted that the wedding had been "long-awaited" by viewers, writing "it's a big week for any Home And Away fans out there who have been waiting months to see Tane and Felicity tie the knot." Stephen Downie, editor of TV Week, branded Felicity and Tane's nuptials "the TV wedding of the year", and called the Māori wedding traditions "beautiful". A Woman's Day NZ writer believed the inclusion of te reo Māori during "such a poignant moment" was a first for an Australian soap. What's on TV chose the episode as part of their "must-see" feature when it aired in the UK.

Felicity and Tane's wedding was included in a 2023 TV Week feature on Home and Away's best ever weddings. A reporter for the publication wrote: "There wasn't a dry eye while watching this stunning and traditional wedding, as Home and Away fans were so thrilled to see these two finally say 'I do'."
