= Eden Fowler =

- Home and Away character
- Portrayed by: Stephanie Panozzo
- Duration: 2022–present
- First appearance: 4 July 2022
- Introduced by: Lucy Addario
In-universe information
- Occupation: Musician; Bartender
- Father: James Fowler
- Mother: Debra Fowler
- Brothers: Levi Fowler
- Sisters: Abigail Fowler
- Husband: Cash Newman (2025–)

Eden Fowler is a fictional character from the Australian television soap opera Home and Away, played by Stephanie Panozzo. She is one of four characters, along with Bob Forsyth (Rob Mallett), Remi Carter (Adam Rowland) and Kirby Aramoana (Angelina Thomson), who were introduced to the show as members of the fictional band Lyrik. They were introduced following the departure of four cast members that same year. After learning of the role, Panozzo sent in a self-tape to the show's casting producers, before she was invited to Sydney for an audition. However, she could not fly after testing positive for COVID-19, which left her fearing she had lost the role. The producers invited her to audition over a Zoom call instead and her agent later informed her that she had secured the role. Panozzo relocated to Sydney from Melbourne a week later. She made her first appearance during the episode broadcast on 4 July 2022. Like the rest of Lyrik, Eden was given an immediate link to the show and its characters through her friendship with Felicity Newman (Jacqui Purvis), but writers also established a former romantic connection between Eden and Felicity's brother, Cash Newman (Nicholas Cartwright).

Panozzo described her character as a "wild child", someone who speaks her mind and "wears her heart on her sleeve". Panozzo believed that she and Eden would be friends in real life and joked that if someone wanted a good night, they should go to Eden's. She also liked her character's style and actually added some of Eden's clothing to her own wardrobe. Panozzo also felt fortunate to play someone who shared similar interests and a passion for music. The role also allowed her to show off her own music and singing skills. Producers soon explored the romantic connection between Cash and Eden, with them becoming a couple after various challenges, including Felicity's opposition, Cash's personal struggles, and Eden's involvement in a dramatic car crash which formed the 2022 season finale. Knowing the couple were supposed to have a strong history, Panozzo and Cartwright worked together to create authenticity. Panozzo thought the characters had good chemistry, despite being quite different from one another. The relationship is tested again when Eden pretends they are engaged and Cash realises he is not ready for that level of commitment.

The character played a prominent role in the 2023 season finale, as she is kidnapped by two brothers who have also critically injured Remi. Following the end of the episode, Seven Network launched an ad campaign to keep viewers engaged with the show during the break, which consisted of posters, social media posts and on-air promo spots, as well as a phone number allowing fans to hear Eden's supposed last phone call. The campaign received a mixed reaction from viewers, but was a success for the network. In the opening episodes of 2024, Eden is eventually rescued, while Remi recovers in hospital. Writers began further exploration of the character's fictional backstory with the introduction of her brother Levi Fowler (Tristan Gorey). It emerges that the pair have been estranged for some time, after Levi seemingly sided with their father after he had an affair and divorced their mother. The siblings try to repair their relationship, until Levi has an affair with Mackenzie Booth (Emily Weir). Panozzo said that for Eden it is "a real betrayal". It forces her to relive "painful memories" of her father's actions, leaving her "traumatised". Panozzo also pointed out that Eden's friendship with Mac is also broken, which is equally as devastating. The Fowler family was expanded in 2024 and 2025 with the introductions of Eden's father James "Jimmy" Fowler (Aaron Jeffery), younger sister Abigail Fowler (Hailey Pinto) and mother Debra Fowler (Tammy MacIntosh). Panozzo enjoyed meeting more of Eden's family and creating an interesting dynamic.

== Casting ==
On 29 June 2022, it was announced that the fictional band Lyrik, made up of four new characters – bassist Eden Fowler, lead vocalist Bob Forsyth (Rob Mallett), lead guitarist Remi Carter (Adam Rowland) and keyboardist Kirby Aramoana (Angelina Thomson) – would be introduced to Home and Away in the coming weeks. The group's arrival followed the departure of four cast members from the serial earlier that year. When the role came up, Panozzo "jumped at the chance to audition" for it. Due to the COVID-19 lockdown in Melbourne, Panozzo had to create a self-tape to send to the casting producers. She received a call back and was invited to Sydney, where the show is filmed, for an audition, however, she was unable to attend after testing positive for COVID-19. Panozzo admitted that she was "devastated" by the situation, as she thought she had lost the role, but she was given the chance to audition over a Zoom call. She was "thrilled" when she learned she had been cast, saying "My agents FaceTimed me, which they never do, and they said I booked the role. I was absolutely blown away and beyond excited. It was a very surreal and incredible feeling." Panozzo relocated to Sydney a week later. She made her debut as Eden during the episode broadcast on 4 July 2022. Panozzo later stated that she grew up watching Home and Away and described being part of the show as "a dream come true" and "a blessing". She also felt fortunate to be part of the show, which she called "an incredible opportunity and training ground", as it helped improve her acting and music skills. She said "It's like a boot camp for young actors in Australia. Its been such a ball and as a character, Eden is so, so fun to explore." After two years in the role, Panozzo admitted that she was still thrilled to be working full-time and "excited" to be on set every day.

== Development ==
=== Characterisation and introduction ===
Eden is a wild child, full of fire and fun. She's fiercely loyal, speaks her mind and her greatest loves are music, her friends and family.

— Panozzo describing her character's traits (2022).

Panozzo felt that she and her character would be friends, but she joked that "Eden's so much cooler than I am." She called her "fun", "fiery" and "loyal as hell". Panozzo liked that her character enjoys making people laugh and that she "wears her heart on her sleeve". She thought that if someone was after a good night, they should "go to Eden's." Panozzo told Kerry Harvey of Stuff that she was a fan of her character's style and admitted to adding some of Eden's clothing to her own wardrobe, saying "My personal wardrobe is so boring. I look at Eden and think, 'Why do I not think about buying this kind of stuff? It's so cool'." Panozzo shares a love for music with her character, and she felt fortunate that she could play someone who was equally "passionate" about it. The role allows Panozzo to show off her own music and singing skills, and she hoped to release her own music in the future. She said "it's definitely something I want to pour more of my time into outside of the Bay. But to be able to play a character that shares very similar interests is so wonderful – and makes me feel more connected."

Lyrik arrive in Summer Bay from the city and play an impromptu gig outside Felicity Newman (Jacqui Purvis) and Tane Parata's (Ethan Browne) house. Purvis explained that the group are old friends from Felicity's past, but Eden is her best friend and they are really close. She said that the band would bring music to the Bay and cause a bit of trouble. Felicity's partner Tane initially wants the band to leave, but she brings him around, until they take over the house. The band's arrival coincides with Felicity becoming co-owner of Salt, the local bar and restaurant. Purvis said that her character comes up with the idea to have Lyrik play the relaunch of Salt, furthering their integration into the Bay. It soon becomes clear that Bob "has big plans" for Lyrik that do not include them staying the Bay. He and Kirby are also in a "rocky" relationship, while Eden and Remi are best friends, who enjoying teasing one another.

As well as the link to Felicity, writers established a connection between Eden and Felicity's brother Cash Newman (Nicholas Cartwright), as it emerges that they dated before their arrivals in the Bay. Joe Julians of Digital Spy said this development causes some controversy among their friends and family. Upon seeing Cash at the end of Lyrik's performance in Salt, Eden jumps into his arms and he is forced to tell Felicity about their romantic history. She then warns Eden away from him as he has a fiancée Jasmine Delaney (Sam Frost), who at the time had left the Bay. Eden apologises to Cash for any hurt she caused him and they agree to be friends, however, a hug between them is misinterpreted by Felicity.

=== Relationship with Cash Newman ===
The relationship between Eden and Cash was explored towards the end of the season, as they have a one-night stand, which they later repeat. Purvis said Felicity is worried that Eden will hurt her brother again and tries to keep them apart. She told Alice Penwill of Inside Soap: "Before they got to the Bay, Eden and Cash had a fling – he was more into it than Eden was, and she left him. Flick is adamant that Eden will do it again." Penwill pointed out that Cash is the one trying to initiate a relationship between himself and Eden, to which Purvis replied that Felicity does not know that and believes it is all down to Eden. When Felicity catches the pair together, Purvis said that her character "feels she's been let down by her friend." Cash and Eden are later forced to work together when Felicity and Tane become engaged and begin planning the wedding. The awkwardness between the pair increases when Felicity tries to "play cupid" during a meeting. Panozzo explained that her character struggles to work alongside Cash and that being around him is "painful" for her, but she powers through for Felicity's sake.

As the storyline progresses, Cash decides that he and Eden have to stay away from one another and not be friends, so that he can get his life together, following a recent shooting in the line of duty and the break up with his girlfriend. A TV Week writer noted that Eden only agrees "to save face", but she appears devastated. Panozzo stated "This really hurts her. Not only does she feel the rejection of unrequited love, but now Cash doesn't even want to see her. But she understands it's ultimately for the best." Another TV Week writer stated that it was obvious Eden and Cash had fallen for each other, but neither appeared willing to do anything about it. Felicity becomes involved again as she changes her hens night plans, so that the women end up in the same nightclub where Tane's bucks party is being held. Eden realises Felicity has set her and Cash up, so she drinks to hide her "humiliation", while he believes she changed the plans in order to get him to say that he has feelings for her too. As Eden and Cash have "a strong history and connection", Panozzo and Cartwright worked together to create authenticity and she hoped viewers would be "excited" with where the storyline was going.

The serial's season finale centred on Felicity and Tane's wedding day and ended on a cliffhanger with Eden and Felicity's lives in danger. As the pair are driving to the wedding venue, their ute crashes and the episode ends with Eden and Felicity trapped in the car. Panozzo explained "Felicity and Eden have jumped in a car and someone has tampered with the brakes. I can say that there is a car crash that happens, and it’s very, very intense. It's massive." She was excited to be involved in the dramatic storyline, and said that filming the scenes with the stunt performers and fire was "fun". In the season premiere, which Panozzo described as "very drama-filled" and "high-stakes intense", both Eden and Felicity are rescued, but Eden is critically injured and placed in a coma. Cash is "beyond despair" as he sits beside Eden's hospital bed. TV Week's Tamara Cullen observed "For Cash, the thought of losing the woman he loves – without having the chance to tell her how he feels – is crushing."

During the show's 8000th episode, Felicity and Tane marry with Eden and Cash as witnesses. The end of the episode sees Cash waking up with a hangover and noticing Eden is wearing the engagement ring he bought for his former girlfriend. Cash is led to believe that he drunkenly proposed to Eden, while she uses the opportunity to play a joke on him and pretend they are engaged. This development tests the strength of the couple's relationship. Cullen (TV Week) said Cash loves Eden, but he knows that he is not ready for that level of commitment. When Eden tells him the truth about the engagement, she quickly notices Cash's relieved reaction and realises how he really feels about marriage, which leaves them both questioning the future of their relationship. Susannah Alexander of Digital Spy wrote "Eden's pride soon feels wounded" and she is left wondering why Cash thinks the idea of marrying her is "so intolerable." Alexander also reported that in a bid to show Eden that he loves her and is ready to make "happier memories" with her, Cash gives her a charm bracelet and gets rid of the engagement ring.

In early 2024, Panozzo told a writer for New Idea that the couple "have great chemistry" and she was "really proud" that it came across to viewers, while Cartwright praised their working relationship. Eden's reaction to being taken camping highlighted the couple's lack of shared interests, but Panozzo believed they would last, saying "Eden and Cash have such a beautiful relationship. They are quite different in many ways, but they actually really complement each other. He grounds her and she brings that bit of craziness into his life." She thought that they worked well because they were "the missing piece for each other". In scenes broadcast in August 2024, Cash proposes to Eden, who is left questioning if it is something he truly wants, as he recently "freaked out" at the idea of marriage. Panozzo told Wade Sellers of TV Week that her character is "thrown" by the proposal, explaining "She thinks Cash isn't thinking straight and is making a rash decision because of everything going on with Felicity." Recalling Cash's negative reaction to Eden's prank proposal storyline, Panozzo said Eden is also left questioning Cash's motives. Sellers reported that after seeking advice from Remi and Felicity, who urge her to be honest with Cash, Eden is still conflicted. Panozzo stated "Cash really is the love of her life, but if Eden says no, she could lose him. But if she says yes, she could end up like her parents: divorced, broken-hearted and with a broken family. That scares her."

The death of Felicity in August 2024 impacts Cash and Eden heavily. After attending the funeral together, Cash tells Eden that their engagement is off. Cartwright said that for Cash, he cannot bear to lose anyone else, so he "cuts free the person closest to him." A couple of months later, Eden was given a new love interest in the form of her sister's counsellor Tim Russell (George Pullar). After Cash tells Eden of his plans to leave the Bay, she is "crushed" and accepts that they are not getting back together. Panozzo stated "She'd do anything to have Cash stay. But she also knows how stubborn and determined Cash is." Eden invites Tim out for a beer and later kisses him. Panozzo said her character knows Tim is kind and seems to care about her, so she sets out to have "a carefree, fun – and very sexy – fling."

=== Abduction ===
The 2023 season finale broadcast on 29 November ended with Eden and Remi's lives in danger, as Eden is abducted and Remi is seriously injured by brothers Wes (Josh McConville) and Mickey (Travis Jeffery). Panozzo was excited for viewers to see the finale and told Georgie Kearney from 7News that it is "gripping, it's amazing, it's heartbreaking, it's intense, it's epic." The episode begins with Cash taking Eden on a romantic break camping in the bush. An Inside Soap writer said Eden is "unimpressed" by the location, as she believed they were going on a luxury getaway. Panozzo admitted that she could relate to Eden's "less than enthusiastic" attitude towards camping, especially if she was not in the right mood. She thought Eden might be feeling the same on the day, commenting "I can resonate with that feeling of, 'I'm not really up for camping today'." Eden later calls Remi to come and get her, but his bike is struck by Wes and Mickey's car. Believing him to be dead, the pair begin digging a grave when Eden stumbles upon them when she needs a toilet break. Eden is knocked out from behind "before she has the opportunity to assess the situation".

Both Eden and Remi are bundled into Wes and Mickey's car and driven away, leaving Cash searching desperately for Eden. Daniel Kilkelly of Digital Spy confirmed the cliff-hanger would begin "a huge storyline" as Eden's disappearance shocks the residents of Summer Bay, while Cartwright stated "It's so great to be a part of this kind of next-level storyline. These upcoming episodes will take the drama to the next level!" Following the end of the episode, Seven Network launched a campaign to keep viewers engaged with the show ahead of its return in January 2024. Posters asking people to "Help Find Eden", social media posts and on-air promo spots were created in a bid to "emulate the true-to-life trauma and action that takes place when a person goes missing". Viewers were also encouraged to call a phone number to hear Eden's supposed last phone call. Mediaweek reported that within 24 hours, over 28,000 fans had called the number. In six days, over 65,000 calls were made to the number and over 400,000 people watched a social media video featuring Cash pleading for Eden's return.

The opening episode of the 2024 season picks up with Cash calling the police after being unable to find Eden, leading to a "massive" search for her, while a "terrified" Eden wakes up next to Remi's body. Panozzo told Inside Soap's Laura Morgan: "Eden rolls over to find the body of her best mate, Remi, who's seemingly dead! She has no idea who these two guys are, but gathers pretty quickly from their conversation that they want to get rid of her." The brothers bring Eden to an abandoned house, where Wes orders Mickey to dispose of Remi's body, but in a twist, he discovers that Remi is still alive. As Eden tries to help Remi, she looks to Mickey for help. Panozzo explained to Morgan that Eden has noticed Wes is the dominant brother, while Mickey is "a bit more timid" and reluctant to go along with his plans, so Eden uses that to convince him to take Remi to a hospital. Panozzo also said that Eden realises Remi's condition is critical and she is "desperate to save him."

Mickey stands up to Wes and they decide that he will take Remi to hospital, but Eden has to stay with Wes at the house. She says "a tearful farewell" to Remi and hides her bracelet in his jacket pocket in the hope that someone will recognise it and come looking for her. Panozzo said that it was a moment of "sheer desperation" for her character. Instead of sticking to the agreed plan, Mickey leaves Remi by the side of a road and calls an ambulance instead. While Remi makes it to the hospital, attention turns to Eden and Wes tells Mickey that "it's time". Panozzo said those words are "hugely terrifying" for Eden and despite being "a tough chick" and someone who can hold her own, she has seen how dangerous Wes can be. She continued: "In those moments you just go to the worst-case scenario, so Eden panics that this is it – she's going to die." The story concludes with Eden escaping Wes and Mickey, as they argue, and being rescued by Cash and Rose Delaney (Kirsty Mariller), after they find her bracelet amongst Remi's possessions at the hospital.

=== Introduction of family ===
"It's all sort of really building up into a very kind of tricky and explosive brother-sister relationship. But this is certainly − I think − a real betrayal for Eden and I think she's going to find it very difficult to move past this and forgive him, if she ever does."

— Panozzo on Eden and Levi's relationship after she discovers his affair with Mac.

In November 2023, producers introduced the character's brother Levi Fowler (Tristan Gorey) and began exploring her fictional backstory. After Eden learns Levi has begun working at the local hospital, she refuses to see him and it emerges that the pair have been estranged following their parents divorce. Gorey explained that after the divorce, Levi went to live with their father, while Eden moved in with their mother. His character believed he was doing the right thing when everyone was condemning his father, however, Eden viewed the move "as a statement" and the resentment grew from there. After Levi gets Remi to talk with Eden, the siblings finally meet to talk, but Eden cannot forgive her brother for seemingly taking their father's side when he had an affair. Gorey said Levi's "love for Eden never wavered, and regardless of her iron-like exterior, he puts it all on the line to rebuild their relationship once again."

The siblings are forced to be around each other as Levi stays in the Bay to treat Eden's friend Mackenzie Booth (Emily Weir) for a serious health issue. Viewers soon learn that Levi has developed feelings for Mac, and he begins using Eden's presence in the Bay as an excuse for his absences to his wife Imogen Fowler (Georgia Blizzard). Eden eventually discovers that Levi is having an affair with Mac, leaving her "horrified", especially as she has recently bonded with Imogen. Melenie Parkes from Stuff said the discovery causes Eden to relive "painful memories of their father cheating on their mother." Imogen later calls Eden in "distress" wanting to know why she hid Levi's affair from her, forcing Eden to apologise for any hurt she has caused her sister-in-law. She then reveals that Mac is the woman Levi has been having an affair with, before vowing to be there for Imogen.

When Levi and Mac go public, Eden does not accept their relationship, which leads Levi to give her an ultimatum – try to move on from what he has done or lose him from her life. Panozzo told Parkes "He sort of says, 'I've had 10 years without you now and I can do it again'. It feels pretty intense really and not very nice at all." Panozzo pointed out how Levi and Eden had "sort of healed things to a certain degree and were making amends", but Levi's affair had undone all of that and Eden is left "traumatised" by Levi repeating what their father did. Panozzo described her character as being "really deeply disappointed and feeling really betrayed and heartbroken, because that trust is yet again broken by another man in her life." Panozzo also said that Eden's friendship with Mac is also broken by the affair, which she thought was "really devastating" as they had "a really beautiful relationship" up until that point.

Producers continued to expand the Fowler family with the introduction of Eden's estranged father James "Jimmy" Fowler (Aaron Jeffery) in July 2024. Actress Hailey Pinto was later cast as Eden's younger sister Abigail Fowler. Abigail is introduced during Eden and Cash's surprise engagement party. As with Levi, Eden and her sister have been estranged, but Sellers (TV Week) noted that "Eden's initial reaction at seeing her baby sister is happiness". However, she soon realises something is not quite right as Abigail is agitated, has a darkness around her eyes, and is constantly receiving messages on her phone. Eden and Levi later learn that Abigail is a drug addict, and they team up to save her when she is trapped in a house in the city by her dealer Dom (Danny Ball). A TV Week writer wondered if they "were prepared to see just how dark the world Abigail has found herself in really is?" The Fowler siblings' mother Debra Fowler (Tammy MacIntosh) was introduced in May 2025, as Cash invites her to celebrate his second proposal to Eden. Inside Soap's Louisa Riley later called the Fowlers "one of the Bay's strongest families". Panozzo told her that it had been "awesome" to meet more of the family and create an interesting dynamic. She stated: "The Fowler family have their past trauma that they're all dealing with – those are the kinds of things that you love to go into, those really emotional scenes!"

== Storylines ==
Eden arrives in Summer Bay with her Lyrik bandmates Kirby Aramoana, Remi Carter and Bob Forsyth. They arrange to stay with Eden's friend Felicity Newman and her partner Tane Parata. Eden, Kirby and Remi agree to play at the reopening of local restaurant Salt, which Felicity co-owns, but Bob refuses thinking the gig is beneath them. However, he is outvoted and the gig is a success. At the end of the night, Eden spots Felicity's brother Cash Newman and she confesses to Felicity that they had a fling, but she left town not long after. She and Cash talk and agree to be friends. Felicity offers Lyrik a regular gig at Salt, but Bob is against the idea and eventually quits the band. Needing a new lead singer, the band hold auditions and choose Theo Poulos (Matt Evans), who soon begins dating Kirby. Eden notices a house for rent in the same street as the Parata house and she asks Cash for a reference. He later confides in her that his girlfriend Jasmine is not returning to the Bay after leaving to care for her in-laws. After Cash is shot, Eden helps cover Felicity's shifts at Salt while she is at the hospital. Both Eden and Remi upset when they miss being part of an interview Theo and Kirby give to an online magazine, which then barely mentions their contribution to the band. They are upset when Justin Morgan (James Stewart) becomes their manager, and Eden wants to fire him when he loses them the gig at Salt.

Felicity asks Eden to keep an eye on Cash, who is recovering from being shot. They have a one-night stand and he rejects her in the morning. However, they have another one-night stand and are caught by Remi, followed by Felicity. She accuses Eden of using her brother, and Eden almost turns down the opportunity to play at Tane's proposal to Felicity. Remi later admits to Eden that he told Cash that she has feelings for him, which prompts Cash to end things between them. Felicity tries to play Cupid with Cash and Eden and forces them to work together arranging her wedding. Bob returns to town, but Eden refuses to play with him when Theo does not turn up for a gig. While helping Felicity to pick a wedding dress, Eden pretends to be a top stylist and borrows a number of dresses for Felicity to pick from. The dresses are stolen from her van and she has to ask Cash for help. They find the thief trying to sell the dresses online and recover them. Felicity decides to bring her hen night to a bar, where she attempts to push Eden and Cash together. Eden falls off a stage after getting drunk and Cash takes her home, where she tells him she loves him. Cash admits that he cannot go through that again, having broken up with Jasmine. Eden drives Felicity to her wedding, but the brakes fail and the ute crashes. After being rescued, Eden is placed in a coma due to a head injury.

When she wakes up, Cash tells her they should be together, but she cannot remember their relationship or the accident. She asks him to stop visiting her, but she later has flashbacks to their time together. Remi confirms the memories are real and Eden deals with them by writing a song. During Lyrik's next gig, Eden sings her song in front of Cash and they kiss. They decide to pursue a relationship. They help Felicity and Tane organise a new wedding ceremony and Eden finds the engagement ring Cash bought for Jasmine. After they both get drunk at the reception, Eden puts the ring on and lets Cash think he proposed to her. Cash's negative reaction hurts Eden and she questions their future, but he later buys her a charm bracelet and gets rid of the ring. Eden is also forced to change how she physically interacts with Remi after noticing how uncomfortable Cash is around them. After refusing to take money from Cash to fund the recording of an album, she tries to get Remi to ask his parents instead. Remi enters Lyrik into a Battle of the Bands competition to win $20,000 and asks his friend Mercedes Da Silva (Amali Golden) to help out. Eden resents Mercedes for trying to take Remi away from Lyrik. Felicity is raped during the competition and Eden takes her to the hospital.

Lyrik begin recording their album and Eden tries to convince Remi to tell his partner Bree Cameron (Juliet Godwin) about Mercedes kissing him. Eden then tells Mercedes that Bree and Remi have been through a lot together, which almost causes Mercedes to leave town. At the album's launch party, Eden, Remi, Theo and Justin learn Kirby has been approached by a record label. Kirby later leaves the band to become a solo artist and Lyrik are denied permission to use her songs. Eden later writes a song about Kirby's betrayal and decides not to attend her single launch. However, she and Remi change their minds, which leads to Kirby quitting her solo deal. Kirby uses the royalties from one of her songs to fund Lyrik's new album. Eden supports Cash when he is suspended from the police force. She also learns her brother Levi is in town to treat her friend Mackenzie, who has suffered a cardiac event. It emerges that the siblings have not spoken since Levi left to live with their father, whose affair broke up his marriage. Eden is unable to forgive her brother and they argue. Cash takes her away for a camping trip, but Eden hates it and calls Remi to pick her up after she finds a tick on her neck. Cash persuades her to give it one more night. While going for a toilet break, Eden comes across two men, Wes and Mickey, digging a hole for a body and she is knocked out from behind. When she wakes up, she finds herself next to a badly injured Remi.

Wes and Mickey bring Eden and Remi to an abandoned house, where Eden tries to convince them to help Remi. Eventually, Mickey agrees to take him to the hospital and Eden puts her bracelet in his pocket. When Mickey returns from leaving Remi by the side of the road, he and Wes prepare to deal with Eden. While they are arguing, she escapes and is found by Cash and Rose Delaney. Eden and Remi recover from their ordeal, but they argue when they are asked to write victim impact statements and Eden wants Mickey to receive a lighter sentence for helping Remi. She also reconciles with Levi and their relationship improves. She befriends his wife Imogen, but is devastated when she discovers that Levi is having an affair with Mac. She asks him to tell Imogen the truth and declares that they are no longer family. She later ignores a series of phone calls from Mac, before learning that Levi has been stabbed. She goes to the hospital, but leaves after seeing Mac comforting him. After the electricity is cut off, Eden accepts Felicity's offer to work at Salt. Eden and Levi's father Jimmy comes to town, but Eden refuses to see him, before accusing him of destroying their family. Eden accepts Cash's marriage proposal and Felicity throws them an engagement party, where she collapses from a brain aneurysm. After being declared brain dead, Eden supports Cash as he agrees to turn off Felicity's life support and donate her organs. At the funeral, Cash breaks up with Eden as he does not want to lose anymore loved ones.

Eden and Levi team up to rescue their younger sister Abigail from her drug dealer. They take her to a local motel and help her go through withdrawal. Eden takes Abigail to a counselling session with Tim Russell and learns that Abigail resents her for seemingly abandoning her for Lyrik. Eden and Tim share a kiss and they later have sex. Abigail reconciles with Eden, who decides to stop seeing Tim. But he drops Abigail as a client and they start dating. Cash tries to stop Eden from seeing Tim and reveals that he had a relationship with a client, Nerida Mullins. Tim explains that Nerida is obsessed with him. Tim accompanies Eden to a song writing retreat with the rest of Lyrik. Tim is beaten and Cash becomes the prime suspect, but Eden defends him. Despite holding a bedside vigil for Tim, Eden admits she still loves Cash. Tim wakes up and confirms Nerida attacked him. Eden tells him about the kiss and he asks her to leave. She is then attacked by Nerida, who ties her and Abigail up in an old rail shed in order to get Tim to rescue them. The police find them and Nerida stabs Eden with a syringe, before she is arrested. Cash stays by her bedside and they reunite. Cash later catches Eden trying on her engagement ring and he plans a surprise proposal at his foster father, Gary's farm. He invites her mother Debra, along with Levi, Abigail, Kirby, Remi and Mac to witness the proposal, which Eden accepts.

Kirby begins recording a solo album with Remi as her producer, which makes Eden feel like she is being left behind. She is reluctant to provide backing vocals for the album, but eventually agrees to do it. Abigail encourages Eden to invite their father to the wedding. After visiting her mother, who confirms that she and Jimmy get along now, Eden contacts Jimmy and accidentally invites him to the Bay. Eden struggles with Jimmy's presence and tells him that she does not know how to stop being angry with him. She then accepts a necklace from him that belonged to her grandmother. Weeks later, Eden and Cash marry in front of their friends and family.

== Reception ==
For her portrayal of Eden, Panozzo received a nomination for Best Daytime Star at the 2025 Inside Soap Awards. The following year, she and Cartwright were longlisted for Best Partnership.

Lucy Croke of TV Week branded Eden and Kirby "two of Summer Bay's cool chicks". Georgie Kearney of 7News dubbed her a "fan favourite". A New Idea writer noted that Eden "has been part of some dramatic plots" during her time in the show. Inside Soap's Laura Morgan thought that Cash and Eden "seem an unlikely match", but Panozzo stated that fans had "responded so well to them as a couple". Another New Idea writer quipped "Eden and Cash have been putting the sizzle into Summer Bay".

Daniel Kilkelly of Digital Spy said Eden's kidnap was another "disturbing twist" in the season finale following Remi's accident. The "Find Eden" marketing campaign received a mixed reaction from fans. Some praised the idea of being able to call and hear Eden's last voicemail, including Panozzo's co-star Matt Evans, who plays Theo Poulos. However, Digital Spy's Stefania Sarrubba reported that the campaign had proved controversial, with Channel 7 "facing backlash" for being "disrespectful" to people going through a similar situation to Cash. Despite this, the network's director of marketing stated that they had been pleased with the success of the campaign.

Ahead of the serial's 2024 return, Clare Rigden of The West Australian pondered Eden's fate, writing "Last time we caught up with Eden, she'd been kidnapped and bundled in the boot of a car next to the body of her best mate — not ideal. Will she make it out alive?" Danica Baker from Chattr commented that viewers were "bemused" by the unrealistic speed with which the search party was arranged for Eden. Baker also called the "Find Eden" ad campaign "intriguing".

Yahoo! Lifestyle's Tahlia Pritchard reported that viewers were "divided" over Eden's "dummy spit" when she learned of Levi and Mac's affair. Pritchard said the scenes in question saw "s**t hit the fan" when Eden realised that her brother stayed in the Bay for Mac and not her. Pritchard reported that viewers were questioning Eden's "dramatic reaction" and whether she had "the right to go off at Levi", before some pointed out that he was "in the wrong" for having an affair.

Pritchard and many viewers later expressed their sympathy for the character after Cash ended their relationship because of his grief. She stated "Eden hasn't always been a fan favourite character, with many questioning why she doesn't have a job and can never get over her father's affair many moons ago. But now Home and Away fans are feeling quite bad for her given she's just lost her best friend and now her boyfriend." Pritchard commented that Cash's decision had left viewers in shock, before criticising the storyline for making everyone suffer further following Felicity's death.

Pritchard later reported that fans of Cash and Eden were "thrilled" when their reunion was confirmed via a promo. She also stated that they have "cemented themselves as one of Summer Bay's staple couples" amidst all the dramas they have faced together. Fans have given the couple the portmanteau of "Caden", while Clare Rigden of The West Australian called them "fan favourites".
