= Remi Carter =

- Home and Away character
- Portrayed by: Adam Rowland
- Duration: 2022–present
- First appearance: 4 July 2022
- Introduced by: Lucy Addario
In-universe information
- Occupation: Musician; Music producer
- Father: Graham Carter
- Mother: Nicola Carter

Remi Carter is a fictional character from the Australian television soap opera Home and Away, played by Adam Rowland. He is one of four characters, along with Kirby Aramoana (Angelina Thomson), Bob Forsyth (Rob Mallett), and Eden Fowler (Stephanie Panozzo) who were introduced to the show as members of the fictional band Lyrik. The band's introduction followed the departure of four cast members that same year. Rowland received an audition for Remi in December 2021 and he felt an immediate connection to the character. He sent in a self-tape and was asked to attend an audition at the show's studio in Sydney three weeks later. Various actors were auditioned together to find the right combination for the band. Two days after returning home, Rowland was informed that he had won the role while he was working a shift at a pub. He was back in Sydney for filming three days later. He made his first appearance during the episode broadcast on 4 July 2022.

Remi is characterised as being a laid-back larrikin. Rowland said Remi likes a good time and called him loyal and someone fun to be around. He felt that there were quite a lot of similarities between himself and Remi. Tamara Cullen of TV Week later observed that Remi had a protective nature and Rowland said that through his experiences, Remi had learnt how to support close friends through their dilemmas. Rowland described Remi as being born with a guitar in his hands and felt fortunate that he was able to combine his own passion for acting and playing the guitar. Remi was given an immediate link to the show and its characters through his friendship with Felicity Newman (Jacqui Purvis). The first scene Rowland, Mallett, Panozzo and Thomson filmed as Lyrik was an impromptu gig outside Felicity's house. The band also play at the relaunch of bar and restaurant Salt, furthering their integration into Summer Bay.

A friendship between Remi and Bree Cameron (Juliet Godwin) develops into a romantic relationship, as Bree confides in him about the domestic violence she suffers at the hands of her husband Jacob Cameron (Alex Williams). Godwin was a fan of Remi and Bree's relationship, as she felt that he showed her character what it was like to be loved. While Rowland felt fortunate for the plot and the chance to play Remi opposite a villain, as it helped show that his morals are strong. In the opening episodes of the 2023 season, Bree kills Jacob in self-defence, which leaves her traumatised and changes her relationship with Remi. She later learns she is pregnant and Remi is shown to be supportive of her decision to have an abortion. The relationship between Remi and Bree faces further challenges, including Bree's insecurity over Remi's job and Mercedes Da Silva's (Amali Golden) romantic advances towards Remi.

Remi is a central figure in the 2023 season finale, in which he is struck by a car while riding his motorbike, leaving him with serious injuries. He is almost buried in a shallow grave by the brothers who hit him, until they are interrupted by Eden as her and Remi's storylines converge. Rowland explained that his character experiences a blunt-force trauma to the heart and has to undergo a surgery with a low survival rate. Various aspects of his recovery are shown, including physiotherapy, but his mental health is shown to be badly affected, especially when Bree ends their relationship due to a lie about selling his motorbike, a move that was criticised by Rachel Choy of Punkee. Producers introduced a new love interest for Remi in the form of actress Stevie Marlow (Catherine Văn-Davies). Scriptwriters created a "love square" as Bree begins dating Stevie's director and former boyfriend, Nelson Giles (Mahesh Jadu). Remi struggles to move on from Bree, which Rowland thought was due to him needing to do some "soul searching still". Rowland and Godwin were later pictured filming a romantic scene together, confirming Bree and Remi would reunite.

Further exploration of Remi and Lyrik's fictional backstory began with the introduction of Remi's friend Sonny Baldwin (Ryan Bown) in 2025, who worked as a promotor for the band and offers to help Remi spend an inheritance. He jeopardises their friendship by trying to kiss Bree. Remi was also seen launching a new career as a music producer, which brings him into contact with guest character Avalon Bracken (Gemma Dart), who gives him some drugs while he works on her and Kirby's solo albums. Rowland said that to Remi, the only way he thinks he can finish the albums is with stimulants so he can stay awake. He also called it a short-term solution, however, Remi hits "rock bottom" when he continues using the drugs and has a one-night stand with Avalon, which ends his relationship with Bree for good.

== Casting ==
On 29 June 2022, it was announced that a fictional band called Lyrik, made up of four new characters – lead guitarist Remi Carter, lead vocalist Bob Forsyth (Rob Mallett), bassist Eden Fowler (Stephanie Panozzo), and keyboardist Kirby Aramoana (Angelina Thomson) – would be introduced to Home and Away in the coming weeks. The group's arrival followed the departure of four cast members from the serial that same year. Adam Rowland received the audition for Remi in December 2021. Remi was the only role Rowland wanted, saying "During the audition process, I certainly felt a connection with that character. I was stoked I got an audition." He was asked to record and send in a self-tape. The audition scene featured Remi bantering with the character of Eden, so Rowland asked a friend to help him out. Three weeks later, Rowland was asked to fly to Sydney to attend another audition at the show's studio. He admitted to being "quite nervous", but he "felt right at home" when he eventually got into the studio.

The process to find the right actors for the band involved the candidates auditioning together and rotating the groups to check their chemistry. Rowland thought everyone he auditioned with was "fantastic". After recording another tape, Rowland returned home and learned he had won the role of Remi two days later. He had been working a shift at a pub at the time and was pouring pints when his phone rang. He told Tamara Cullen of TV Week that he was "excited and slightly daunted" about his life changing. He packed a suitcase and his guitar and was in Sydney for filming three days later. Of joining the cast, Rowland stated "It's a phenomenal opportunity that I've been given. I'm so grateful for it. Right now, I certainly want to focus on doing my best and becoming a better actor. And what better place to do that?" Rowland felt "incredibly relaxed" during his first day on set, which involved the band performing on-location outside the Parata family home. His debut episode aired on 4 July 2022.

== Development ==
=== Characterisation and introduction ===
Rowland described his character as "the quintessential Aussie larrikin." He also called him "a pretty laid-back guy" and said that very few things affect him, however, when they do, Remi "stands to attention and he's quick to resolve conflict." He also said Remi is "a fun guy to be around", "enjoys a good time and stirring the pot, but is loyal to his friends and family." Rowland liked that aspect of his character's personality and said that he tries to be like his character in real life. He thought there were quite a lot of similarities between himself and Remi. Remi's best friend is Eden and the pair are always teasing one another. In 2024, TV Week's Tamara Cullen observed that Remi has a "protective nature", and Rowland explained that he "has been through quite a lot in his time in Summer Bay – he's learnt to ride the highs and lows of relationships and how to support close friends through any dilemma." Rowland said his character was "born with a guitar in his hands". Rowland also plays guitar and sings. He was once in a band with friends and has performed at open-mic nights. He considered himself to be "incredibly lucky" that he was able to combine acting and playing guitar. He explained that the actors pre-record and perform their performances live during filming. They learn the songs together and work with the music team. Rowland found that performing the songs live was actually "beneficial to his acting", as it helped him get into character and into "the moment".

Lyrik are given an immediate connection to the show's setting of Summer Bay through their friendship with established character Felicity Newman (Jacqui Purvis). After arriving from the city, they play an impromptu gig outside Felicity and Tane Parata's (Ethan Browne) house. This was the first scene Rowland, Mallett, Panozzo and Thomson filmed as Lyrik. Rowland admitted that they were all "nervous and stressed, and incredibly excited." Purvis explained that the group are old friends from Felicity's past and that Eden is actually her best friend. She said that the band would bring music and trouble to the Bay. Tane initially wants the band to leave, but she talks him around, until they take over the house. Lyrik's arrival coincides with Felicity becoming co-owner of local bar and restaurant, Salt. Purvis revealed that Felicity comes up with the idea to have the band play at the relaunch of Salt, which furthers their integration into the Bay. Sam Warner of Digital Spy reported that Bob "has big plans for the group" and thinks that Summer Bay is underserving of their talents. He and Kirby are also in a "rocky" relationship, putting further strain on the band. Bob later leaves Lyrik and is replaced by Theo Poulos (Matt Evans).

In an early storyline for the character, Remi befriends Ziggy Astoni (Sophie Dillman), who helps him look for a replacement van after Bob leaves the band and the Bay. While inspecting a prospective van, the owner tricks them and steals their car, forcing the pair to spend the night in an old shed. Neither Remi or Ziggy have their phone with them, leaving Ziggy's partner Dean Thompson (Patrick O'Connor) "worried sick". Dean also believes that Remi is "out to steal Ziggy from him" and when he tracks them down, he punches Remi.

=== Relationship with Bree Cameron ===
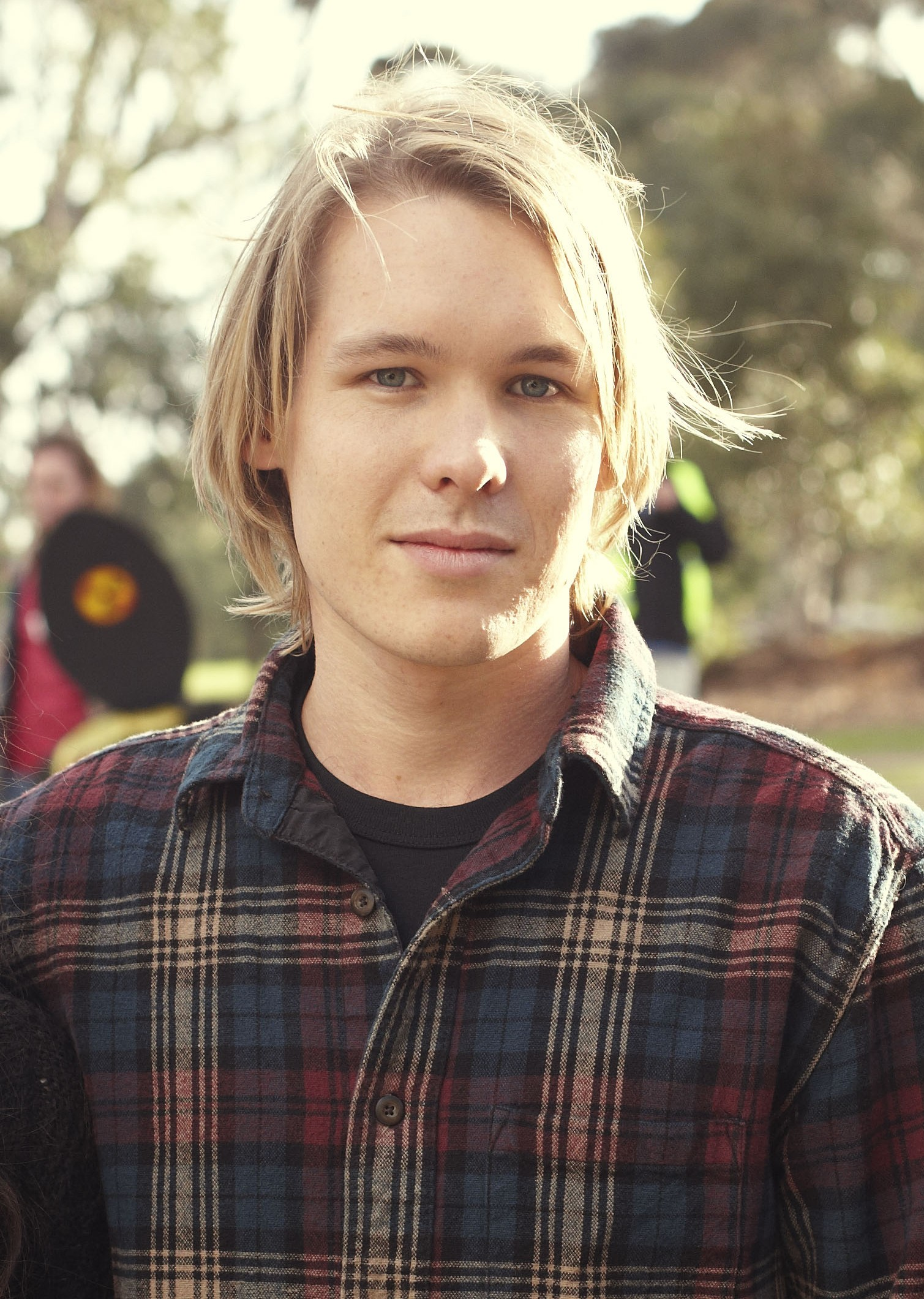
Alex Wlliams (pictured) portrays Bree's abusive husband Jacob, who attacks Remi in a bid to control Bree.

Scriptwriters established a friendship between Remi and Bree Cameron (Juliet Godwin) in late 2022, and despite "a simmering attraction" between them, Bree makes it clear that she is married. Godwin said that her character enjoys the attention from Remi and he makes her laugh, but she loves her husband, even though their relationship is "very complex." Bree's husband Jacob Cameron (Alex Williams) is introduced while Remi and Bree are having breakfast at local restaurant, Salt. It is clear to both Remi and viewers that he is not happy to see Bree with another man, while Remi is shown to find Jacob's presence "intimidating" and he feels that something is not right. Remi becomes a confidante to Bree throughout her domestic violence storyline, and their friendship is developed into a romantic relationship. Godwin loved their relationship, calling it "beautiful" and saying that Remi had shown Bree "what it looks like to be truly loved". Godwin also said that she had enjoyed working with Rowland on the storyline. She also revealed that with Jacob hiding in the Bay to keep an eye on Bree, both her and Remi were in "serious danger" and that they were "about to face something huge".

As their relationship becomes more serious, Bree decides that she will seek a divorce and plans to take Remi out on a date in public. Rowland told a TV Week writer that Remi is relieved by Bree's empowerment to free herself from her toxic marriage. He continued: "The date, albeit fraught with danger, is special for him. The woman he's falling in love with wants to be with him." However, the couple's relationship is tested when Jacob enters Bree's motel room and demands that she leaves the Bay with him. Remi attempts to rescue her, but he is overpowered and tied to a chair, before Jacob threatens to maim his hands and end his music career. Rowland explained that for Remi, his immediate thought is "Whatever you do, don't turn that hammer on Bree", adding that he is willing to go through the pain of having his hands broken in order to stop Jacob from hurting her. Rowland felt "very fortunate" to be playing Remi opposite a villain like Jacob, as it showed his character's "morals and values are strong." He praised Williams for his portrayal of Jacob and for not glorifying Jacob's behaviour.

In the opening episodes of the 2023 season, Bree is rescued after being held hostage by Jacob, who she ends up killing in self-defence. Tamara Cullen (TV Week) observed that this event changes everything for the character and her relationship with Remi. She is traumatised at having taken a life, while also feeling guilty for having sex with Jacob to keep herself safe. Godwin told Cullen that Bree did not think she had a choice and that "it was her way of protecting herself and keeping Jacob's temper at bay." As Bree deals with the pain and guilt, Cullen wrote that Remi feels that their strong connection is "slipping further away..." In a further twist to the storyline, Bree learns she is pregnant, but is unsure whether Remi or Jacob is the father. Bree's guilt about having sex with Jacob to "mollify" him during her hostage ordeal leads her to cut Remi out of her life. Godwin commented that Bree "is riddled with guilt" while Remi demands an explanation. In an episode broadcast on 23 March 2023, Bree tells Remi about her pregnancy. Daniel Kilkelly from Digital Spy noted that Remi "was kind and understanding in response". He is also supportive of her decision to have an abortion. The relationship between Remi and Bree faces further challenges, including Bree's insecurity over Remi's job, but Joe Anderton from Digital Spy said that "the chemistry between them is still strong".

Producers introduced violinist Mercedes Da Silva (Amali Golden) to the show when Lyrik begin recording their first album. Her presence causes trouble for Remi and Bree, as it becomes obvious that Mercedes is attracted to him. After the band record their first track for the album, Remi and Mercedes stay behind to continue working and she makes romantic advances towards him. Mercedes kisses Remi, but he rejects her advances and she is late to their next recording session. Bree notices that Remi is "evasive" about Mercedes and later overhears them discussing the kiss. Cullen reported that Bree accepts that nothing else happened between them, but she is "still concerned he chose to lie about what occurred."

Writers split the couple up in 2024, after Bree asks Remi to get rid of his motorbike, following a traumatic accident. Bree is "visibly unsettled" when she sees Remi celebrating the bike's restoration and she becomes anxious over losing him. The break-up plays out after Bree learns Remi has been storing the bike at Justin Morgan's (James Stewart) garage, so he can ride it in secret. Of Bree's reasons for ending the relationship, Godwin explained: "it wasn't a matter of, 'I'm walking away because I don't love you', it's a matter of, 'I'm walking away, because I don't know if I can live a life constantly being afraid of whether you're going to come home to me at night or not'." Godwin felt both characters were "justified" in their actions, with Bree wanting Remi to give up the bike, and him choosing to keep it because it brings him joy. Godwin found the complexity of the situation interesting to play out.

=== Hit-and-run accident ===
The character plays a central role in the 2023 season finale. He initially experiences a "crisis" when Bree tells him that she wants to join Doctors Without Borders and asks him to come too. Rowland called Bree the love of Remi's life and thought it would be "difficult" for him to consider being apart from her, saying "after everything they've been through already, he knows she needs to do this for herself regardless of whether he can go or not." Remi is torn between Bree and his career as a musician, so he plans to discuss the news with Eden, however, she is away on a camping trip with Cash Newman (Nicholas Cartwright). Their storylines merge when Eden calls Remi to pick her up on his motorbike. During the ride, Remi is struck by a car and thrown from his bike. Rowland reckoned that after such a collision, "it would seem entirely likely no-one would survive." The men who struck Remi believe him to be dead and decide to bury him in a shallow grave, however, they are interrupted by Eden and they kidnap her, forming a cliffhanger.

When the serial returned in January 2024, Eden has been reported missing while her captors Wes (Josh McConville) and Mickey (Travis Jeffery) work out what to do with her. When Eden wakes up, bound and gagged in the back of their vehicle, she makes "a grisly discovery." Panozzo told Laura Morgan from Inside Soap: "Eden rolls over to find the body of her best mate, Remi, who's seemingly dead!" Wes orders Mickey to dispose of Remi's body, but he soon discovers Remi is still alive, but in a critical condition. Panozzo explained that Eden knows Wes is the more domineering of the two brothers, so she appeals to Mickey to get Remi some help, as she can see he is dying. Mickey agrees to take Remi to the hospital and Eden puts her bracelet in Remi's pocket in the hope that someone will come to her rescue. Mickey leaves Remi by the side of the road instead, before calling an ambulance who locate him and take him to the hospital, where Bree is on duty and forced "to battle to save the life of the man she loves."

Remi suffers a major setback after he is discharged from the hospital. He returns home under the care of Eden and Kirby, while Bree is visiting her sick father. Rowland explained that his character suffered "traumatic blunt-force trauma to the heart" which left him with internal haemorrhaging, and it was only "sheer luck" that Levi Fowler (Tristan Gorey) was in town and able to perform a cardiac thoracotomy, which Rowland said has only has a 20 per cent survival rate. Remi is told to take things easy and monitor his pain, and he later lies to Bree that he is still in the hospital, which makes Eden and Kirby uncomfortable, as they do not want to lie to their friend. Remi's pain later escalates, leaving him hot, sweaty and "writhing in pain on the bathroom floor", leaving Eden no choice but to call for help. The character's physical and mental health begins to go down hill following his break-up with Bree, who had discovered that he lied about selling his motorbike. Remi is shown attending physiotherapy as part of his recovery, but he is impatient and rude to Eden when she takes him to his latest session and he overreaches, leaving him in pain yet again. Rowland told Cullen: "Remi is in a rough spot. He can't see the way forward without the love of his life. He also faces an uphill battle with his recovery. He's under lots of pressure."

=== Relationship with Stevie Marlow ===
Remi was given a new love interest in the form of actress Stevie Marlow (Catherine Văn-Davies), who is staying with Cash, while he serves as her bodyguard. The characters meet after Eden admits her fears to Remi about Stevie and Cash getting too close. Văn-Davies commented "Stevie and Cash are the perfect odd couple, but when it comes to matters of the heart, she stumbles upon a 'more compatible' option, shall we say." The actress thought that much of Stevie's life is so tightly controlled, thanks to her career and her stalker, that she sees "the potential for freedom" and a chance to be herself with Remi. As Remi moves on with Stevie, Bree assures him that she is fine, but Scott Ellis of TV Week noted that Remi might not be. Rowland told him: "Remi's putting on a tough facade, but he's hurting. As much as he wants to forget Bree, there are a ton of feelings he hasn't processed yet." Scriptwriters then created a "love square" as Stevie moves the production of her latest film to Summer Bay, and Bree agrees to a date with director, and Stevie's former boyfriend, Nelson Giles (Mahesh Jadu). When Nelson invites Remi and Stevie to join them, Rowland said the situation turns "painfully awkward" with Bree and Stevie in the same place. He thought that it was hard for the former couple to have closure after a relationship like theirs, as they have been through "a hell of a ride" and things will take time.

Remi and Bree are shown "running into each other" on several occasions, leading them and viewers to question whether they still have feelings for one another. The "awkwardness" continues when both couples end up under the same roof again. Rowland explained that there is always guilt and jealousy when someone is processing a former partner moving on. He said that his character is "conflicted" by Bree's jealously and starts comparing himself to Nelson. He continued: "Remi is trying to understand what it is that Nelson has that he doesn't." During a "passionate exchange", Remi and Bree talk things out and make amends, but Remi struggles to move on fully. Rowland believed this was because Bree is "everything that Remi wants", however, he is aware that it was not working for them and he needed to do "a little bit of soul searching still." Remi and Stevie's relationship ends at the conclusion of her storyline, which sees her fatally shot on the beach by her stalker Sidney Wickham (Joshua McElroy). Rowland stated that "Remi blames Cash. It was his job to protect Stevie. His only thoughts are if Stevie is ok." Godwin and Rowland were later photographed filming a romantic moment between their characters, confirming that they would eventually reconcile.

=== Sonny Baldwin and drug use ===
Further exploration of Remi and Lyrik's fictional backstory began with the introduction of his friend Sonny Baldwin (Ryan Bown) in early 2025. It is established that Sonny is Lyrik's former promotor and mascot, who left the group to go travelling. Upon his arrival in the Bay, he offers to help Remi spend his inheritance. Bown explained that Sonny and Remi were best friends when they were younger and that they both came from wealthy families, but Sonny's parents lost their money due to "bad investments" and they abandoned him. Bown also stated "Now he's back, not for Remi's money, but he missed everyone." Some of Sonny's early scenes see him working with Bree to get Remi and Cash talking again, following a falling out. Sonny takes advantage of his access to Remi's money and later his newfound friendship with Bree when he tries to kiss her. Bown believed that Sonny had always been jealous of Remi and his "charmed life", and said that for his character it feels that things always fall into Remi's lap and that "eats away at Sonny, especially when he meets Bree." He continued by saying that Sonny's jealousy "gets the better of him" and when he kisses Bree, he "jeopardises" his friendship with Remi.

That same year, the serial began "a dark new storyline" for Remi following the introduction of singer Avalon Bracken (Gemma Dart). At the time, Remi is overseeing the production of Kirby's solo record when he agrees to play guitar for Avalon too. The pressure of working on both records sees his attention towards Kirby waver amidst Avalon's demands. When Remi expresses how tired he is, Avalon gives him a sachet of drugs despite Remi telling her he does not need anything. However, he does not return the sachet. As he continues working on both records, Remi is seen taking some of the pills. Of the situation, Rowland explained: "Remi has such a small window of time to finish the album and the only way he thinks he can do that is with stimulants to keep him awake." However, the side effects of taking the pills cause Remi to be late for Kirby's album launch party and is the only one with the finished recording. Remi is "barely keeping his eyes open" after staying up all night to finish the record and soon collapses on his bed. Rowland described his character's decision to use drugs as "a short-term solution" and one that he thinks no one else needs to know about, as it "won't be a problem." Sonny is sent to track Remi down and retrieve the recording, and he finds his friend passed out with the empty sachet next to him.

The character's continued drug use leads to him hitting "rock bottom" as he has a one-night stand with Avalon, following a "drug-fuelled spiral". Remi is caught out by Eden, who is "disgusted", and Sonny who cannot understand his friend's state of mind. Cullen noted that Remi blames "stress, drugs and recklessness" and expected that none of that would help him save his relationship with Bree. Rowland told her that Remi is going through "a period of his life where he doesn't know what he's doing. He's not self-sabotaging. He isn't thinking." Rather than try to hide his infidelity, Remi confesses all to Bree. Following the couple's break up, Remi begins to "self-destruct". He drinks alcohol to "numb the pain", and is shown drunkenly harassing Bree, being asked to leave Salt, and throwing a punch at Cash. A hungover Remi faces the consequences of his actions when he gets on his bike and Cash is forced to chase him down, before administering a breathalyser test which shows he is over the limit.

== Storylines ==
Remi, Kirby Aramoana, Eden Fowler and Bob Forsyth arrive in Summer Bay and play an impromptu gig in the street outside Felicity Newman and Tane Parata's house. Despite Bob's reluctance, the band play at the reopening of Salt, a restaurant that Felicity co-owns. Remi flirts with Ziggy Astoni, until he is warned off by her partner Dean Thompson. Felicity offers Lyrik a regular gig, which Bob is against them accepting and he soon quits. After holding auditions, the band select Theo Poulos as their new member. Remi, Eden and Kirby move into a house opposite Felicity and Tane. Remi asks Ziggy to help him find a new van for the band, but when they meet up with the seller Carl (Matt Hardie), he locks them in a shed and steals Remi's money and Ziggy's car. With no phones, the pair are forced to stay in the shed overnight. Dean rescues them and punches Remi out of jealousy. Justin Morgan arranges to sponsor a new van for the band and becomes their manager. Kirby and Theo are interviewed about Lyrik, but Eden and Remi are barely mentioned and Remi thinks about quitting until Eden talks him out of it. Remi asks Bree Cameron to join him for a drink, but Bree keeps things friendly between them. Remi is admitted to the hospital with concussion after being attacked and robbed while busking. He asks Bree why she will not give him a chance and she tells him that she is married. Remi has sex with his nurse Stacey Collingwood (Maleeka Gasbarri).

Bree's husband Jacob arrives in town and Bree asks Remi not to contact her. Remi later sees her with a bruised face, which he realises Jacob caused. He tells Bree to come to him if she needs help. Bob returns and Kirby allows him to sing with the band. After the gig, Remi visits Bree and they have sex. They begin dating in secret and he supports her when she reports Jacob to the police. Jacob tracks Bree to her motel, where he ties Remi up and smashes his hand with a hammer, before taking off with her. Days later, Bree is found after she kills Jacob in self-defence. Remi suffers a set back with his recovery when he attempts to play guitar without his hand brace. Bree distances herself from Remi and later confesses that she is pregnant, but she is not sure who the father is. Remi goes with her when she has an abortion. Lyrik decide to record an album and Eden suggests Remi ask his parents for financial help, but he refuses. Lyrik enters a Battle of the Bands competition and Remi asks violinist Mercedes Da Silva to join them. They reach the final, but pull out when Felicity is raped. While working on the album, Mercedes kisses Remi and later tells him that she wants a relationship with him, but he lets her down gently. Bree later hears them discussing the kiss and Remi convinces her he was innocent.

Remi and Justin organise an album launch party. When Kirby goes solo, Justin tells the band they can no longer use any of her songs. After Remi and Eden attend her single launch, Kirby decides to come back to Lyrik. Remi invites Bree to his parents' anniversary dinner. Bree is uncomfortable with his expectations of them being together for 35 years like his parents. Remi agrees to collect Eden from a camping trip with her boyfriend Cash Newman, but he is struck by a car and thrown from his motorbike. Brothers Wes and Mickey believe him to be dead and plan to bury his body, however, Eden stumbles on the scene and they abduct her. She discovers Remi is still alive and convinces the brothers to get him help. He is left by the side of the road and rushed to the hospital with serious injuries. His recovery is long and he has to attend physiotherapy. Bree threatens to end their relationship if Remi rides his motorbike again. He asks Justin to store it instead, but when Bree finds out she breaks up with him. After arranging to use Cash and Felicity's swimming pool, Remi meets actress Stevie Marlow and they have sex. Stevie returns to town to shoot her film and she and Remi begin dating again. They go on a double date with Bree and director Nelson Giles. Stevie is shot and killed by her stalker, and Remi takes his grief out on Cash.

Bree tells Remi that she wants to be with him, but he asks her for some time. Needing to pay the bills, Remi turns to session work. He and Bree reunite. After he notices Bree obsessively cleaning and learning that she almost let Alf Stewart (Ray Meagher) die, Remi encourages her to seek help as he thinks she has paranoid psychosis. Bree leaves for an assessment and returns with an OCD diagnosis. Remi inherits a large trust fund set up by his grandmother. He decides to fund Lyrik, help build a new bait shop for Alf, and pay Bree's student loan. He hires a retreat for the band to practice and write new songs. Eden's new partner Tim Russell is seemingly attacked by Cash, cutting the trip short. Remi friend Sonny Baldwin comes to the Bay and helps Bree to get Remi and Cash talking again. He starts taking advantage of Remi's money and later tries to kiss Bree. Remi agrees to produce Kirby's solo album. While they work, he meets fellow singer Avalon Bracken, who is working on her second album at the same studio. She watches Remi play the guitar and she invites him to play on her album. Remi struggles with his workload and Avalon hands him a sachet of drugs. The pressure increases when Kirby and Avalon decide to record a duet for Kirby's album, and Remi takes the drugs to stay awake. Remi misses Kirby's album launch party after taking more drugs. Sonny finds him passed out on his bed when he comes to collect the finished recording. Remi has a one-night stand with Avalon and is caught by Eden and Sonny. He tells Bree and she breaks up with him. They attempt a reconciliation, but Bree is unable to get past Remi's infidelity. Remi starts his own record label, Back on Track Records, with help from Sonny. He signs his first artist Eddie Shepherd (Stephen Madsen) shortly after.

== Reception ==
A Yahoo! Lifestyle reporter said viewers were "delighted by the fresh storyline and new faces" when Remi and his band members were introduced. Rowland called the viewer's reactions to Lyrik "phenomenal", saying "So many people have come up and said it's great to have music on the show. It brings a lot of life to the show." However, in August 2024, fans of the band began questioning when they would play again. The Yahoo! writer pointed out that "there have been multiple near-death accidents and kidnappings that have happened to the band members, it makes sense they might need a bit of a breather. There may also be a reason that the writers aren't heaping success on Lyrik. If the group finally made it big, there’s no doubt they would have to leave the small town of Summer Bay." The writer also noted that some of the show's fans disliked Lyrik and were happy with their lack of screen time.

A critic for the Hull Daily Mail noticed the attraction between Bree and Remi, quipping "Remi provides Bree with a shoulder to cry on as she searches for a way to escape from Jacob. He'd like to provide her with a lot more too". Yahoo! Lifestyle's Tahlia Pritchard called Remi and Bree "one of the show's strongest couples", but pointed out that they "haven't been without their dramas: after all, they fell in love when Bree was still married to her abusive husband, and Remi's musical ambitions and ego are known to cause tension."

Rachel Choy, writing for Punkee, criticised the decision to split the couple up, calling it "bizarre". She stated: "After everything that Bree and Remi went through with Bree's abusive ex-husband Jacob – including Bree's decision to abort her surprise pregnancy after not knowing who the father was – it seems like a bizarre move to tear them apart. But I guess this is Summer Bay, and nobody is allowed to be happy." Choy noted that fans of the show were not happy with the break-up, following the separation of popular couple Tane Parata and Felicity Newman. She felt that viewers "want some form of happiness in the bay, goddammit."

A Western Daily Press reporter thought Stevie had an "impact" on Remi, who was "thrilled to have her back in the Bay", but "their public displays are making it awkward for Bree." Another writer for Yahoo! Lifestyle stated that Remi and Bree "have been through some tense situations" and that fans were "devastated" about their break-up, but "overjoyed" to learn that they would get back together. Tamara Cullen of TV Week called the character's relationship with Avalon "controversial" and said it ventured into "dangerous territory" when he cheated on Bree with her. She also stated that it was "a moment of passion that Remi will live to regret." Simon Timblick of What's on TV thought the character was "on a dangerous path to self-destruction" after his break-up with Bree, and nicknamed him "rebel Remi". In 2025, Chloe Timms from Inside Soap questioned whether anything could redeem Remi after he cheated on Bree and wounded her.
