= Bree Cameron =

- Home and Away character
- Portrayed by: Juliet Godwin
- Duration: 2022–2025
- First appearance: 9 August 2022
- Last appearance: 6 November 2025
- Introduced by: Lucy Addario
In-universe information
- Occupation: Doctor
- Husband: Jacob Cameron (until 2023)

Bree Cameron is a fictional character from the Australian television soap opera Home and Away, played by Juliet Godwin. She was introduced after the sudden departure of actor Harley Bonner, who played Dr. Logan Bennett. Godwin auditioned a number of time for Home and Away, but upon receiving the character brief for Bree, she was excited to send in an audition tape. Following an additional round of auditions, Godwin's agent informed her she had secured the role. She filmed her first scenes on-location at Palm Beach, and made her debut as Bree during the episode broadcast on 9 August 2022. Bree is characterised as kind, caring, laidback, and compassionate. She is also a surfer, something that Godwin had started learning before she was cast. Bree is passionate, confident and committed to her career in medicine. Godwin carried out her own research into the medical terms that her characters uses and spoke with the serial's medical adviser. Bree's first scenes see her treating Constable Cash Newman (Nicholas Cartwright) after he is shot on duty.

As the character settles into Summer Bay, it emerges that she is the victim of domestic violence at the hands of her husband Jacob Cameron (Alex Williams). Godwin felt grateful for the storyline and hoped it would bring awareness and help other women in Bree's situation. She carried out extensive research and spoke with survivors and psychologists. The couple's story concludes with Bree killing Jacob in self-defence, after he kidnaps her. Bree is left with severe PTSD from the situation, and the scriptwriters included scenes of Bree struggling to regain her identity in the aftermath, which reflected real life. Writers also established a close friendship between Bree and musician Remi Carter (Adam Rowland), which later develops into a romance; Godwin admitted that she loved them as a couple. They face several challenges, including Bree's decision to have an abortion after discovering she is pregnant, her reluctance to be intimate, and infidelity from Remi. Writers split the couple up in early 2024, and both Bree and Remi were given new love interests, which formed a "love square". After Godwin and Rowland were spotted filming a romantic scene, it was confirmed that Bree and Remi would reconcile.

The death of Felicity Newman (Jacqui Purvis) leads to a new issue-based storyline for Bree, as she fears making a mistake leading to the death of another patient. Godwin said Bree starts to doubt her ability as a doctor and she becomes overly cautious and starts behaving erratically. Tahlia Pritchard of Yahoo! Lifestyle believed Felicity's death had also caused Bree's past PTSD to flare up again. When Bree freezes in a loop of thoughts about her abilities, it almost kills Alf Stewart (Ray Meagher) as she accidentally withholds medication. Bree eventually seeks professional help and receives an OCD diagnosis. One of the character's final storylines saw her stabbed by a patient. In July 2025, Godwin's departure was confirmed when a photo of her farewell dinner was posted on social media. Her final scenes aired on 6 November 2025, as Bree leaves the Bay for a new job. The scene in which Bree kills Jacob was nominated for the OMG Soap Moment at the Digital Spy Reader Awards. The domestic violence plot was branded "one of the most important storylines Home and Away had tackled" by Georgie Kearney of 7News. Rachel Choy of Punkee criticised Bree and Remi's break-up after everything they had been through, while viewers praised Bree's OCD storyline for its realism.

== Casting ==
In March 2022, Godwin was photographed filming her first on-location scenes at Palm Beach, New South Wales, where the serial's exterior scenes are usually shot. Her casting as the show's new doctor was officially confirmed on 19 July 2022. The character was introduced following the sudden departure of Harley Bonner, who played Dr. Logan Bennett, the head of the emergency department at the local hospital. Godwin had previously auditioned for various Home and Away characters. She told Tamara Cullen of TV Week that her agent sent her the audition details Bree, and after reading the character brief, she was "super-excited" to send in an audition tape. Godwin commented "I mean she's a pretty incredible act. I had a lot of fun putting down the audition tape." Following a second round of auditions, Godwin was given the role. She learned of her casting while she was in her bedroom putting on a face mask for a night in. She said her agent called her and she "did a happy dance." She admitted that winning a role on Home and Away was "a dream come true", and told Stephanie McKenna of PerthNow: "The fact that I'm able to wake up and go to set every day and do what I love is such a gift. I'm really grateful for this opportunity. Everyone there is so lovely. I get to work with really talented actors, and it's always a fun vibe." Godwin made her first appearance as Bree on 9 August 2022.

== Development ==
=== Characterisation and introduction ===
The serial's producers billed Bree as "laid-back, kind and caring", but that she was also hiding something behind her "bubbly demeanour". Godwin's description of Bree was similar as she called her "a laidback, compassionate doctor who loves a laugh." She also said Bree had a "heart of gold", and was "considerate and smart as a whip." Godwin admired her character's "work ethic and also her friendliness", adding that Bree tries to bring "a lovely positive atmosphere" to whatever situation she finds herself in. Outside of the hospital, Bree is "a surfer chick". Godwin admitted that she loved that aspect of her character, as she had been getting into surfing as it was her partner's hobby. She started learning some time before being cast and told Alice Penwill of Inside Soap that while she was not a "seasoned professional" like Bree, she made up for her lack of technique with "passion and gusto."

The character is "passionate" about her job as a doctor and thinks that "hard work and compassion" is the key to helping people in need. During her appearance on The Morning Show, Godwin told Larry Emdur and Kylie Gillies that Bree is "very confident and very committed" to her job. She will just deal with a problem and "get to the bottom of it." Godwin carried out her own research into the medical terms that Bree uses and she also spoke with the show's medical adviser. Discussing Bree's fictional backstory, Godwin explained that she was born and raised in Newcastle. Upon seeing a job vacancy at the Northern Districts Hospital, she is quick to relocate to Summer Bay for a much needed "fresh start". Godwin said that for Bee, Newcastle and Summer Bay are both laid-back places where she can help those in need and go surfing in her spare time. Godwin also said that her character does not know anyone in the town, but she is "excited" to join in with the community and "slow down."

Of the Bree's arrival, Godwin stated: "At first, she settles into the Bay well – she loves her new home, the epic surf and the welcoming locals. But as weeks go by, we learn there's rather more to Bree's story." Godwin was excited for viewers to see what else Bree "has in store for them" and said that it was "inevitable" that there would be drama. Godwin told Stuff's Kerry Harvey that she was learning "more and more" about Bree as the months went on. She compared it to reading a book which kept her guessing what would come next. During the character's first episode, she is called upon to treat Constable Cash Newman (Nicholas Cartwright) after he is shot while on duty. Larry Emdur joked that she was "thrown in the deep end" with the storyline, but Godwin enjoyed being part of some "high action" scenes. She also thought it showed viewers that Bree would work hard and fight for her patients. Bree gives Cash's sister Felicity Newman (Jacqui Purvis) "an optimistic outlook" on his condition, but later admits to paramedic Xander Delaney (Luke Van Os) that it might have been "false hope."

=== Marriage and domestic violence ===
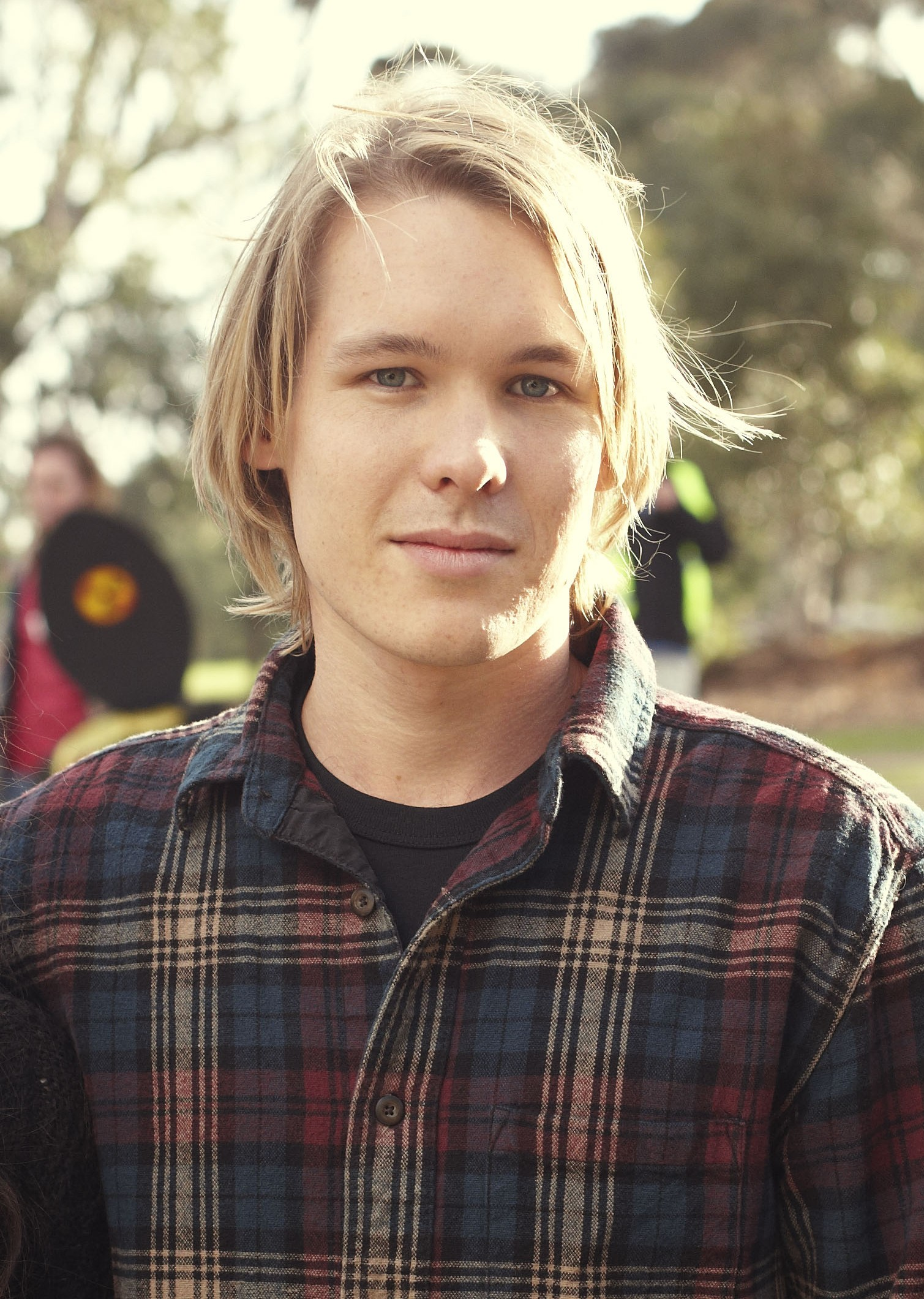
Alex Wlliams (pictured) portrays Bree's abusive husband Jacob. Godwin hoped Bree's storyline would help women in the same situation.

The character was billed as hiding "a big secret" as part of an issue-based storyline, and it slowly emerges that she is the victim of domestic violence at the hands of her husband Jacob Cameron (Alex Williams). When asked how she felt coming into the show with storyline, Godwin told Alice Penwill of Inside Soap: "When I was first told about Bree, I felt grateful that I had the opportunity to tell such an important tale. I want to do this story justice, tell it to the best of my ability, and hopefully it can help women who are in Bree's situation." Godwin later called it an "intense but really important" storyline and explained that from an actor's perspective, it would "be rewarding", while also bringing awareness to the issue. In order to portray the story as authentically as possible, Godwin carried out extensive research, which included talking to people involved with White Ribbon Australia and listening to stories from survivors and psychologists. She also took part in the Walk for Women's and Girls Emergency Centre (WAGEC). Speaking to Georgie Kearney from 7News, she stated "From what I could gather from my research, there is a feeling that women can get where they feel quite stuck because, sadly, what happens is not only physical violence but there's a lot of emotional abuse. And that will wear someone down and make someone second guess themselves, live in fear and make them want to keep this secret."

Godwin felt that her character, a successful doctor, was the "perfect vehicle" to show that domestic abuse can happen to anyone. Penwill pointed out that Bree is a different person when she is at work compared to when she is at home, which Godwin said was a deliberate depiction. She reiterated that domestic violence "doesn't discriminate" and often women put on "a strong face" so no one knows what is going on at home. She continued "They are working professionals who are fantastic at what they do, but then they go home to a nightmare." Jacob's introduction occurs while Bree is sharing breakfast with her new friend Remi Carter (Adam Rowland). It is clear that Jacob is not happy to see Bree with another man, and Godwin commented that viewers can see there are issues in their relationship instantly. Remi is also shown to be wary of Jacob, who is "intimidating" towards him.

Bree's home life starts to affect her job when she accuses Dean Thompson (Patrick O'Connor) of abusing his pregnant partner Ziggy Astoni (Sophie Dillman). The storyline sees Ziggy admitted to the hospital after a fall. Bree hears an over-protective Dean urging Ziggy to be more careful, as this is the second time she has fallen, while Ziggy apologises. Godwin said the tone Dean's uses is "triggering" for Bree and "alarm bells start ringing." She also said that after Bree notices a bruise on Ziggy's leg, it confirms "in her mind" that she is being abused. Bree then opts to keep Ziggy in the hospital, while reporting Dean to the police for domestic violence. Godwin explained: "Bree has far too often experienced having to make excuses for her own injures – she won't sit back and watch someone else suffer in silence." Bree's actions leave Dean and Ziggy confused, especially when Dean is barred from seeing Ziggy. When she overhears him asking his sister Mackenzie Booth (Emily Weir) to keep an eye on Ziggy because he cannot, this leads her to realise she has got the situation completely wrong. Godwin said Bree is "heartbroken" by her mistake and realises that Dean is nothing like Jacob. This then "propels her" to report her own situation to the police.

Jacob is banned from contacting Bree, but he later breaches this to intimidate her, leading Remi to warn him off. Towards the end of the season, Jacob continues to watch Bree "like a hawk" and when he learns Remi and Bree are dating, he "storms" into her hotel room and demands that she leaves the Bay. He manages to overpower Remi and ties him to a chair, before giving Bree a "terrifying" ultimatum – leave with him or watch him smash Remi's hands with a hammer ending his music career. Rowland said that Remi would rather Jacob smash both his hands as long as he does not use the hammer on Bree. After injuring Remi, Jacob abducts Bree. When Home and Away resumed in January 2023, it emerges that Bree has been missing for a number of days. As the episode unfolds, viewers see that Bree and Jacob are camping out in remote bushland. As Jacob holds Bree in "what he considers a loving embrace", it is clear to viewers that she is "petrified" of him. Godwin explained that Bree has no idea what Jacob is planning, and she has had to leave the man she loves injured and alone. Godwin said Bree is "living her worst nightmare." As Bree writes a letter to Remi, Jacob catches her and in his rage, he strikes her and knocks her unconscious. When she wakes up, Jacob is digging what appears to be a grave.

Bree ends up killing Jacob in self-defence, leaving her traumatised. Cullen branded it "a kill-or-be-killed moment". Bree's guilt about Jacob's death is apparent throughout her police interview, despite reassurance from Rose Delaney (Kirsty Mariller) that it is not her fault. Godwin said Bree's "world shatters" when she realises that Jacob is dead and knowing she has taken a life, it "cracks her identity." Meanwhile, Bree's relationship with Remi suffers as she hides the fact that she had sex with Jacob during her ordeal in order to stay safe. Godwin told Cullen: "Bree felt she didn't have a choice – it was her way of protecting herself and keeping Jacob's temper at bay." Talking to The Daily Telegraph's Lisa Woolford, Godwin explained that her character would have to go through "a healing journey" before being able to move on with her life, as she had "quite severe PTSD". Knowing that victims of domestic violence struggle to regain their identity after leaving their partner, the writers incorporated this into Bree's story, but also added in some "sprinkles of hope". Woolford added that at the end of filming each day, Godwin made sure to leave her character's trauma behind, but she was aware that there were a lot of women in real life who could not "clock off" from similar situations.

=== Relationship with Remi Carter ===
Bree forms a close friendship with musician Remi Carter following her arrival. Laura Masia of TV Week observed that the pair had "a simmering attraction" between them. However, Bree makes it clear that she is married and they remain friends. Godwin told Masia that her character "loves the attention Remi is giving her. He makes her laugh. But she does have a husband who, although she loves him, the relationship is very complex." Throughout Bree's domestic violence plot, Remi acts as her confidante and their relationship eventually develops into a romance. Godwin admitted that she loved them as a couple, calling their relationship "beautiful". She also said that Remi had "opened Bree's eyes to what it looks like to be truly loved". A TV Week writer called Remi "the light at the end of the tunnel for Bree", but in a conversation with Ziggy Astoni, it is clear that Bree feels immense guilt for cheating on her husband despite Ziggy reassuring her that she needs to do what she can to get by. After keeping their relationship a secret, Bree later declares that she will get a divorce and she plans to take Remi on a public date. Rowland said his character feels relief that Bree has become "empowered" enough to break free from her marriage. He continued "The date, albeit fraught with danger, is special for him. The woman he's falling in love with wants to be with him."

Godwin later told Penwill (Inside Soap) that with Jacob still around, there would be "serious danger ahead" for Bree and Remi. She teased a dramatic storyline for the couple, saying that they would "face something huge". Remi is later attacked by Jacob and left for dead, while Bree is abducted and taken to remote bushland, where she is beaten by Jacob. Her feelings for Remi help her through the ordeal and Godwin said that for her character "Remi renewed Bree's view of what relationships could be. The safety and love Remi gave her opened her eyes to what a relationship should be." After Bree kills Jacob in self-defence, the pain of her ordeal is "too raw" and the connection she has with Remi suffers, especially as she is also hiding the fact she had sex with Jacob in order to stay safe. In a further twist, Bree becomes pregnant, but she is unsure whether Remi or Jacob is the father. Cullen noted that Bree's "joy" quickly gives way to guilt, as she has still has not told Remi that she had sex with Jacob to "mollify" him during her kidnapping. The vast amount of guilt she feels leads Bree to end her relationship with Remi. Godwin commented that her character "doesn't have the emotional capacity to engage romantically with anyone."

During the serial's 8000th episode, Bree decides to terminate her pregnancy. Praising the writer's decision to explore the issue, Anita Anabel of Mediaweek pointed out that the subject of abortion had been "taboo" on television for years, while actress Ada Nicodemou (who plays Leah Patterson) believed that it would spark "familial discussions" and help viewers going through something similar. Bree and Remi's relationship continues, and Joe Anderton of Digital Spy commented that "the chemistry between them is still strong". However, the couple faces several challenges, including Bree's reluctance to get physically intimate because of her trauma and her insecurity over Remi's job as a musician. Remi also cancels a tour with Lyrik, so he can be around to support her, which Bree feels is "disempowering for her". Writers later introduced violinist Mercedes Da Silva (Amali Golden) to the Lyrik dynamic, which also causes trouble between Remi and Bree. Mercedes makes romantic advances towards Remi and later kisses him. Although he "set things straight" between them, Remi hides the kiss from Bree. She later overhears him and Mercedes talking at a recording session and Cullen said she is "ready to let loose". The writer commented that Bree is both "concerned" and upset that Remi lied to her.

During the 2023 season finale, Remi suffers major injuries in a motorbike crash and the storyline ultimately leads to "a heartbreaking split" between him and Bree. In the aftermath of the incident, Bree is "visibly unsettled" when she sees Remi celebrating the restoration of his bike with his friends, especially as she put her career and life "on hold" to help Remi as he recovers. Bree develops "fear and anxiety" over losing Remi, which is made worse with the death of her father, so she gives him an ultimatum – get rid of the bike or their relationship is done. The split plays out after Bree learns Remi has been storing the bike at Justin Morgan's (James Stewart) garage, so he can ride it in secret. Godwin explained that Bree's reason for breaking up with Remi is mainly her job. She is aware of the risks that come with riding a motorbike and she almost saw him die. She stated "And so it wasn't a matter of, 'I'm walking away because I don't love you', it's a matter of, 'I'm walking away, because I don't know if I can live a life constantly being afraid of whether you're going to come home to me at night or not'." Godwin also felt that Bree was "justified" in asking Remi to choose between her and the bike, but she was also aware that Remi is equally justified in choosing to keep his bike because "it's his joy and it's his life". Godwin thought the complexity of the situation was what made it interesting.

==== Love square ====
Not long after their break-up, both Remi and Bree are given new love interests in the form of actress Stevie Marlow (Catherine Văn-Davies) and director Nelson Giles (Mahesh Jadu). When Remi begins dating Stevie, Bree is quick to reassure him that she is fine with his new relationship, however, Rowland said that his character is not. He stated "Remi's putting on a tough façade, but he's hurting. As much as he wants to forget Bree, there are a ton of feelings he hasn't processed yet." Melenie Parkes of Stuff said Bree was actually "quietly heartbroken" over Remi's new relationship. When Stevie moves the production of her latest film to the Bay, her director Nelson is introduced and is "instantly interested" in Bree when they meet. A writer for TV Week noted that Bree is "careful" about encouraging his attentions, but after he gives her his phone number, she agrees to a date. Parkes thought there was "a definite spark" between the pair. The new couples end up on "an especially squeamish double date" when Nelson invites Remi and Stevie to join him and Bree. Rowland explained that the situation is "painfully awkward" for Remi, especially seeing Bree and Stevie in the same place for the first time. He also thought it would take time for Bree and Remi to gain closure on their relationship.

Parkes joked that viewers "need an evidence board" to keep up with the character's connections in the love square. On-screen, Bree does not know that Nelson is directing Stevie's film, while he and Stevie are unaware that Bree and Remi were in a long-term relationship. Godwin also called the scenes "highly awkward" and was grateful that she herself had not been in a similar situation. She told Parkes: "I really just looked at the given circumstances and thought to myself, 'if this happened to me, it would be so weird, and really quite a challenging situation to navigate'. When Remi sat next to her (Bree) and Stevie across from her and there was Nelson, I think she was completely floored." Godwin also told Parkes that she found the scenes "fun to film". She confirmed that Bree was still in love with Remi, and was proud of the way she deals with the situation. Godwin said her character "feels unbelievably uncomfortable. But she holds her ground and she doesn't let it overwhelm her too much. It's more afterwards, I think, she finds it a little bit overwhelming and a bit bizarre." Godwin felt that there was a chance for Bree and Remi to get back together, as she did not fall out of love with him, but it was "the right decision at the right time".

Remi and Bree are shown accidentally meeting each other several times. Wade Sellers of TV Week put this down to the pair still having romantic feelings for one another and the Bay being too small for all of them. This was reflected on-screen after Bree and Remi end up at the same house following dates with their new partners. Bree questions whether the Bay is big enough for both couples, which Remi agrees with. Rowland told Sellers: "Processing an ex moving on is almost always wrapped in guilt and jealousy." He also explained that Remi feels "conflicted" by Bree's jealousy, but he also starts comparing himself to Nelson and wondering what he has that Remi does not. During a "passionate exchange", the former couple try to sort out things between them and make amends. Rowland added that "Bree is still everything that Remi wants. But at this stage of their lives, it's not working and he needs to do a little bit of soul searching still."

In June 2024, Godwin and Rowland were pictured filming a romantic moment between their characters, confirming that Bree and Remi would reconcile. In the build up to the reconciliation, Remi clashes with Bree when he learns she has been joining Nelson on motorcycle rides, remembering why they broke up. He also ends his relationship with Stevie to focus on himself. Stevie is later shot and Bree is unable to save her. Nelson quits as the director of the film and leaves the Bay for a new project.

=== Anxiety and OCD ===
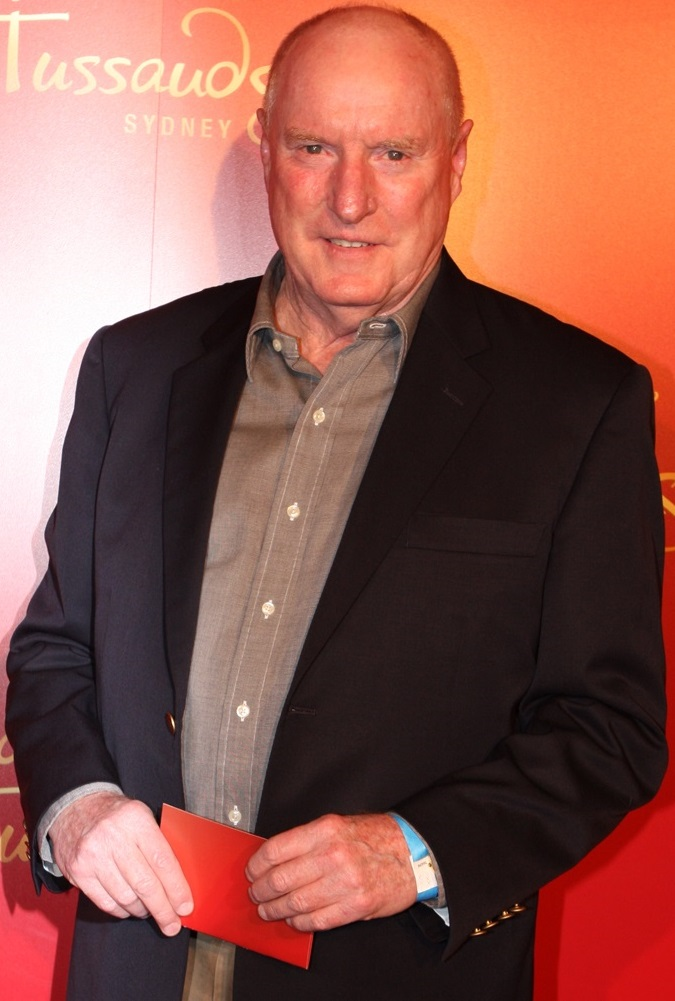
Bree is diagnosed with OCD after freezing while treating Alf Stewart, played by Ray Meagher (pictured).

Writers began "a big new story" for the character in September 2024, after she is unable to save Felicity Newman's (Jacqui Purvis) life and begins to struggle at work because of it. Bree is "haunted" by Felicity's death from a brain aneurysm and fixates on her last moments while she was in her care. Godwin explained "Bree was the doctor in charge of Felicity's case, and couldn't save her. She becomes terrified of making a mistake and losing another patient." Godwin also said that Bree feels somewhat responsible for the "devastating effect" Felicity's death has had on the community and she starts to doubt her ability as a doctor. This fear leaves Bree with a need to control everything and be overly cautious. Bree's behaviour causes her problems while treating a patient in accident and emergency. After some blood splashes onto her scrubs, Bree leaves to clean it off, leaving nurse Dana Matheson (Ally Harris) to deal with the patient alone. Godwin explained that the moment is Bree losing control, as seeing the blood leads to thoughts of "what if?" and Bree is "frozen and becomes overwhelmed." Viewers see that Bree remains obsessed with the blood stain as Dana asks her what happened.

Remi becomes concerned about Bree when he finds her cleaning her apartment, following an argument with Dana. When he offers her his help, Bree "explodes". Remi then expresses his views about her moving on from Felicity's death with professional help, but while it comes from a place of love, Bree does not want to hear it. Godwin told TV Week's Scott Ellis that her character is reluctant to seek help because she worries that the counsellor will report her to the hospital. As the storyline continues, the character is seen acting erratically and "slowly spiralling out more". She makes odd calls at the hospital, works longer shifts, and struggles to sleep. Tahlia Pritchard of Yahoo! Lifestyle observed that Felicity's death has likely led to Bree's past PTSD "flaring up again", with the added addition of OCD symptoms.

Bree's worries about her ability to do her job almost kills Alf Stewart (Ray Meagher) when he is admitted with chest pains. Bree freezes while treating him and withholds life saving medication. Of the moment, Godwin stated "Bree doubts her ability to make the correct decision under pressure. She's lost in a loop of thoughts as she weighs up her options." After fellow doctor Levi Fowler (Tristan Gorey) reports Bree to the medical board, she accuses him of faking the charge to cover up his own errors and an investigation is launched. However, Bree's issues are still not being dealt with, and Godwin reckoned that the emotions are "too painful for Bree to process" so her immediate reaction is to blame everyone else. She also pushes Remi away when he tells her to take responsibility for her actions.

Bree eventually seeks professional help, and after taking a leave of absence from the hospital, she returns with an OCD diagnosis. However, her return is marred by a "run in" with Alf's daughter Roo Stewart (Georgie Parker), who tells Bree that she is not sure she can forgive her for almost causing Alf's death. Godwin said that Bee is "devastated" by Roo's words, but she understands why she is angry as she "dropped the ball" while treating Alf. Other Bay residents also turn on Bree, but she knows that it will take time to convince them that she deserves a second chance. Godwin explained "At first, Bree is overwhelmed by everyone's emotions. However, she's determined to follow the guidance of her counsellor and focus on healing and trying to make amends as best she can." She added that her character is aware it will be tough, but she is also determined to prove that she has changed, she owns her mistake.

=== Break-up and stabbing ===
Writers split up Bree and Remi again, as part of the latter's drugs storyline. Remi is seen hitting "rock bottom" with his continued drug use and following a "drug-fuelled spiral", he has a one-night stand with singer Avalon Bracken (Gemma Dart). Rowland commented that his character is experiencing "a period of his life where he doesn't know what he's doing." After Remi is caught out by his friends, he decides to tell Bree what happened, ending their relationship. Tamara Cullen (TV Week) observed that Bree's life "is spiralling out of control" as she tries to "reconcile to life" without Remi, while also dealing with some new house mates. Not long after the break-up, Bree is attacked by a patient at the hospital.

The scenes occur during a busy shift at the hospital for Bree and new nurse Jo Langham (Maddison Brown). Paramedics bring in Bart Ainsworth (Charlie Falkner), who is clearly agitated and seemingly on drugs. As Jo attempts to assess him, Bart becomes "unruly and aggressive" and Bree intervenes to protect Jo. Godwin said Bree is on "high alert" as Bart becomes more combative, explaining "She's dealt with patients like this before and knows their behaviour can turn nasty in an instant. She has to navigate giving him the treatment he has the right to, while still managing his mood and protecting her staff." Bree has Bart moved to a private ward and tries to calm him down, while waiting for security. Cullen wrote that Bree is in "fight or flight mode, and Bart goes into attack mode." Bart gets a hold of some scissors and stabs Bree in the side. Godwin described the situation as "terrifying", as Bree bleeds out and struggles to breathe. She gets away from Bart and slumps against the wall, where Jo and the other staff find her. Godwin told Cullen that Bree's life is in danger as she has a punctured lung and is aggravated by Jo and Levi's assessment of her condition. Godwin added "Blood is pooling in her lung and, unless Levi can fix it quick, Bree knows she may not survive."

=== Departure ===
On 15 July 2025, a photo was posted on social media platform Instagram confirming that Godwin would be exiting the serial in the coming months. The photo showed Godwin at a meal with some of the cast and crew, while the caption revealed that they were celebrating the birthday of one of the show's make-up artists and Godwin's farewell. Yahoo! Lifestyle's Lachlan Guertin reported that "a production insider" had told the website that Godwin filmed her final scenes the previous week, with her final storyline playing out in late 2025. The character's exit aired on 6 November 2025. Bree leaves Summer Bay after securing a new job working for Doctors Without Borders. Paying respect to their character's history, Bree and Remi had sex and realised that it was "the perfect goodbye". He later urged her not to forget him, with Bree replying that he had changed her life. Bree shared her final scenes with Remi, Mackenzie, and Sonny Baldwin (Ryan Bown).

== Reception ==
At the 2023 Digital Spy Reader Awards, the scene in which Bree kills Jacob was nominated for the OMG Soap Moment accolade.

Alice Penwill of Inside Soap said Bree had "proved herself as a brilliant doctor" since her arrival. She also stated that the character had gone through "some horrifying moments so far" with the domestic violence storyline. Georgie Kearney of 7News said the character's domestic violence plot was "one of the most important storylines Home and Away had tackled". The scenes showing Bree in a physically abusive marriage led to women who had gone through a similar experience, reaching out to Godwin to tell her that "they had been moved by the episode." Melenie Parkes of Stuff commented: "Bree has had some tough times since arriving in Summer Bay."

Viewers have praised the character's fashion sense. One particular outfit consisting of a red tank top, high-waisted jeans, and a tan crossbody bag "sent fans wild" and they "shared their admiration for her outfit" online, with many asking where they could find the bag for sale.

Rachel Choy of Punkee was critical of the decision to break Bree and Remi up, stating "After everything that Bree and Remi went through with Bree's abusive ex-husband Jacob – including Bree's decision to abort her surprise pregnancy after not knowing who the father was – it seems like a bizarre move to tear them apart. But I guess this is Summer Bay, and nobody is allowed to be happy." Choy also pointed out that fans were not happy that Bree had been given a new love interest so soon, likening it to the breakdown of Tane Parata (Ethan Browne) and Felicity Newman's relationship. She felt that viewers "want some form of happiness in the bay, goddammit." A Yahoo! Lifestyle writer noted that "fans were devastated" by the break-up, while a TV Week writer commented that it "was never going to be easy" for them, but it was "turning into a nightmare".

When Stevie tries to reconnect with Remi, a reporter for the Bath Chronicle observed that despite Bree's assurances that she is okay, "it's clear she's struggling to deal with it." Observing Remi and Stevie's relationship, a Western Daily Press reporter commented that "their public displays are making it awkward for Bree." The reporter thought she looked happy getting to know Nelson, but after Stevie demanded his attention, they quipped "Is Stevie intent on monopolising every man Bree knows?"

Despite initial upset that Bree almost let Alf die, viewers defended the character's OCD storyline and praised it "for being a realistic take on mental health."
