= Stephanie Panozzo =

Australian actress

- Born: Melbourne, Victoria
- Education: Western Australian Academy of Performing Arts
- Occupation: Actress
- Years active: 2015–present
- Known for: Home and Away

Stephanie Panozzo is an Australian actress, best known for playing Eden Fowler in the television soap opera Home and Away since July 2022.

== Career ==
Panozzo attended drama school in Melbourne and in her final year was cast in Channel Nine's Hyde & Seek Playing a minor role of the character Angela Petrides - the show also stars Deborah-Lee Furness, Matt Nable and Zoe Ventoura, which started her acting career. She also graduated from The Western Australian Academy of Performing Arts (WAAPA) in 2015 where she studied acting. She has since worked across Stage, TV and Film. After Hyde and Seek, she went into being in The Newsreader (2021–), My Life is Murder (2019), Spongo, Fuzz & Jalapena (2019). The actress starred in Josh Todaro's 2021 Button Man, a short film.

On 29 June 2022, Panozzo's casting details were announced in which she would star and join the cast of the Australian soap opera Home and Away along with three other new cast members after multiple departures. It was confirmed she would play the role of Eden Fowler and would be in the band Lyrik. It was also made known that her character already knows some people in Summer Bay, e.g., Cash Newman, played by Nicholas Cartwright, as they dated before both of their arrivals. She made her first appearance on 4 July 2022. Her character has been involved in many storylines since her arrival such as her relationship with Cash, clashing with an old friend of best friend Remi Carter's, Mercedes Da Silva, and being involved in three near-death experiences. In late 2023 her brother, Levi Fowler, arrived in the bay as Eden's estranged older brother, played by Tristan Gorey.

== Personal life ==
Panozzo has been in a relationship with cook Josh Kelly since at least 2017. She said that their long-distance relationship was a challenge, as Kelly lives in Melbourne.

== Television ==
Year	Title	Role	Notes
2015	Life in a Library	Suka	Short film
2015	Godot's Clinic	Nurse Mizzi	Short film
2016	Hyde and Seek	Angela Petrides	Season 1 (recurring role, 6 episodes)
2019	My Life is Murder	Hannah	Season 1, Episode 7 (guest role)
2019	Spongo, Fuzz & Jalapeña	Jalapeña / Sky	26 episodes
2020	Hell Patrol	Dahila	TV film
2021	The Newsreader	Jenny	Season 1, Episode 4 (guest role)
2021	Button Man	Jade	Short film
2022–	Home and Away	Eden Fowler	Series Regular (500+ episodes)
2026	Armstrong	Ellie	Short film
