= Mahesh Jadu =

Australian actor (born 1982)

- Born: 26 October 1982 (age 43); Melbourne, Victoria, Australia
- Occupations: Actor, composer
- Years active: 2008–present
- Known for: Marco Polo (2014–2016); Neighbours

Mahesh Jadu (born 26 October 1982) is an Australian actor. He is best known for the role of Dr. Doug Harris in the soap opera Neighbours and the role of Ahmad in Netflix original series Marco Polo. He also portrayed the supporting role of Shanmugum in the miniseries Better Man and Vilgefortz in The Witcher.

== Early life ==
Mahesh Jadu was born in Carlton, Victoria, Australia and was named Mahesh Khushidev Jadunundun.. His parents are from Mauritius and his Indo Mauritian ancestry originates from Bihar, Gorakhpur and Kashmir. He was raised in Canning Vale which is a suburb south of Perth in Western Australia, and spent his high school years in a cricket scholarship before he veered into film and television.

== Career ==
He started off as a composer for an Australian show, Byte Me. He auditioned for a small role in an Indian film, Sorry Bhai! and was subsequently cast. He was later cast in one of Australia's longest running soaps, Neighbours as Doug Harris. He played poker to cover rent and living expenses until he was called for an audition by the casting director, Lou Mitchell.

In 2011, he was cast in an Australian drama, Taj, which was presented at the 16th Busan International Film Festival.

He then worked on The Three Ages of Sasha. He got his big break when he was cast in Roland Joffé's periodic drama, Singularity, which was later renamed The Lovers. In 2015, he was cast in Netflix's Marco Polo as Ahmad Fanakati. and had a role in I, Frankenstein. In 2019 he played Vilgefortz of Roggeveen in the Netflix's TV series The Witcher.

He started a production company, Ākaasha Media, with producer Nikit Doshi and is slowly carving a path as a filmmaker also.

== Filmography ==
=== Film ===
Year	Title	Role	Notes
2008	Sorry Bhai!	A Student	
2008	Two Fists, One Heart	Ringside Official	
2011	Taj	Vjay	Male lead
2012	The Three Ages of Sasha	Nasir Khan	Male lead
2013	Magnetism	Mark	Short
2013	The Lovers	The Assassin	
2014	I, Frankenstein	Ophir	
2015	Judi Dench is Cool in Person	Mahesh	Short
2017	Pirates of the Caribbean: Dead Men Tell No Tales	Spanish Soldier	
2017	Three Summers	Baktash	
2019	Submit Tweet	Critic	Short
2020	Emerald	Zal	Short
2020	The Furnace	Sadhu	
2023	It Only Takes a Night	Jeffrey D. Phillips	
2025	The Ice Road 2: Road to the Sky	Rudra Yash	
2026	Tamerlane: Rise of the Last Conqueror	Hussayn	
TBA	Honeymoon	Eric	Post-production

=== Television ===
Year	Title	Role	Notes
2010–11	Neighbours	Dr. Doug Harris	Season 26–27 (recurring, 33 episodes)
2013	Better Man	Shanmugum	Miniseries (1 episode)
2014	Winners & Losers	Evan Madawella	Season 3 (guest, 2 episodes)
2014	Sam Fox: Extreme Adventures	Raj	Season 1 (guest, 1 episode)
2014	Marco Polo	Ahmad	Season 1–2 (main cast, 20 episodes)
2019–	The Witcher	Vilgefortz	Season 1–3 (main cast, 11 episodes)
2024	Home and Away	Nelson Giles	Season 37 (recurring role)

=== Production credits ===
Year	Title	Notes
2005	Byte Me	Composer (TV series)
TBA	Topping Out	Producer (in production)
TBA	The Heretics	Producer (pre-production)
TBA	Kibo	Producer (in development)
