= Catherine Văn-Davies =

Australian actress

- Born: Canberra, Australia
- Education: Queensland University of Technology; HB Studio, NYC
- Occupation: Actress
- Years active: 2007–present
- Known for: Amazing Grace; The Twelve; Hungry Ghosts
- Partner: Fayssal Bazzi

Catherine Văn-Davies (born 1985 or 1986) is an Australian actress of partial Vietnamese descent.

== Early life ==
Văn-Davies' mother was a refugee from Vietnam who arrived in Australia at the age of 18, after the United States and allies withdrew from the country.

Văn-Davies was born in Canberra, spent part of her early childhood in Indonesia, and her school years in Brisbane, Queensland. After graduating from high school, she undertook a business degree at the Queensland University of Technology. She soon switched her focus to acting and completed a Bachelor of Fine Arts in 2006. She also studied at the HB Studio in New York City.

== Career ==
After returning to Australia from New York, Văn-Davies moved to Sydney and worked mostly in theatre. In 2019 she won a Sydney Theatre Award for her role in Angels in America (Best Female Support), and another one for White Pearl (Best Ensemble). In 2021, she starred as Abigail in Playing Beatie Bow. At the 2023 Sydney Theatre Awards, she won Best Performance in a Leading Role in a Mainstage Production for her role in Constellations and Best Performance in a Supporting Role in an Independent Production for A Streetcar Named Desire. She also serves as co-artistic director of the Old Fitz Theatre.

Văn-Davies has also appeared in multiple Australian TV series, most notably Hungry Ghosts (2020) and Amazing Grace (2021). In 2022, she appeared in the ABC drama Barons, as well as Foxtel legal drama The Twelve.

In 2023, Văn-Davies made several television appearances in Stan series Wolf Life Me, reimagined comedy series Mother and Son and crime miniseries The Claremont Murders. In the latter series she played the real-life Alison Fan, who reported on the case from the first day to the last day. The following year, she played the recurring role of film star Stevie Marlow in the soap opera Home and Away.

== Personal life ==
Văn-Davies has been in a relationship with fellow Australian actor Fayssal Bazzi since 2014.

== Filmography ==
=== Television ===
Year	Title	Role	Notes
2005	Hot Source	Presenter	
2014	Precinct 13	Frisky Dupont	TV series, season 2, episode 1: "Baby Jane's, Goodbye"
2017	Pet Killer	Vivian	Web series
2018	True Story with Hamish & Andy	Physical Girl	TV series, season 2, episode 5: "Phil"
2018	Fighting Season	Social Worker	Miniseries, episode 6: "Outside The Wire"
2019	The Letdown	Siah	TV series, season 2, 2 episodes
2020	Liberty Street	Phoebe	TV series, 1 episode 8: "Phoebe & Tait"
2020	Hungry Ghosts	May Le	Miniseries, 4 episodes
2021	Amazing Grace	Laney Tran	TV series, 8 episodes
2022	Barons	Shirley Kwong	Miniseries, 4 episodes
2022	The Twelve	Vanessa Young	Miniseries, 10 episodes
2022	It's Fine, I'm Fine	Kate	Miniseries, episode 4: "I Hate This Thing"
2023	The Claremont Murders	Alison Fan	Miniseries, 2 episodes
2023	Mother and Son	Maya	TV series, season 1, 8 episodes
2023	Wolf Like Me	Melanie	TV series, season 2, episode 3
2024	Home and Away	Stevie Marlow / Miranda	TV series, 27 episodes
2024	Bump	Louise	TV series, season 5, episode 1 (guest)
2025	He Had It Coming	Convenor	TV series

=== Film ===
Year	Title	Role	Notes
2007	All My Friends Are Leaving Brisbane	Wedding Guest	Feature film
2007	When Sally Met Frank	Nurse	Short film
2009	Entanglement Theory	Dancer	Short film
2009	Lonely	Gyspy	Short film
2023	Sweet Juices	Sarah	Short film
2023	Dog	Brittany	Short film

== Theatre ==
=== As actor ===
Year	Title	Role	Notes
2005	Terrain! Terrain! Terrain!	Various characters	QUT
2005	Camille	Sophie	QUT
2005	Twelfth Night	Maria	QUT
2005	We Will Rock You!	Scaramouche	QUT
2006	Our Country's Good	Duckling	QUT
2006	Lion in the Streets	Isobel	QUT
2006	Once in a Lifetime	Miss Chasen / Coat Check Girl	QUT
2010	He Left Quietly (reading)	Various	New York Theatre Workshop
2011	Running Blind	Sue / Lola	Milk Crate Theatre
2011	Secrets	Lizzy	Milk Crate Theatre
2011	The Bitter End	Catherine	Midsumma Festival
2011	Waltzing Woolloomooloo: The Tale of Frankie Jones	Frankie	Arthur
2011	Brigitte, Bracken & Box	Brigitte, Bracken & Street Girl	Milk Crate Theatre
2011	The Kiss	Various characters	Company B
2011; 2013–2015	Cut Snake	Kiki Coriander	Regional NSW & VIC tour, Brisbane Festival with Arthur/Critical Stages/RAV, Theatre Works
2012	Unfinished	Coral	Milk Crate Theatre
2012	sex.violence.blood.gore	Annabel Lee	MKA
2012; 2013	Full Circle	Ruth	Milk Crate Theatre
2013	Lord of the Flies	Sam	US-A-UM / Malthouse Theatre, Melbourne
2014	Superhero Training Academy	Collateral Glammage	Arthur
2014	The Myth Project: Twin	Adi	Arthur / MTC
2014; 2016	Dangerous Liaisons	Emilie / Azolan	Little Ones Theatre / MTC / Darwin Festival / Brisbane Powerhouse
2015	No Place Like	Slim / Charlotte / Flick	Milk Crate Theatre
2015	Dracula	Dracula	Little Ones Theatre
2016	Ground Control	Tara	Rachel Perks & Bridget Balodis
2016	Turquoise Elephant	Visi / Vika	Griffin Theatre Company
2016	Back at the Dojo	Lois & others	Belvoir Theatre Company / Stuck Pigs Squealing
2017	The Merchant of Venice	Nerissa	Bell Shakespeare
2017; 2020	The Happy Prince	Swallow	Roundhouse Theatre, Brisbane with La Boite Theatre Company / Little Ones Theatre
2018	Complexity of Belonging	Catherine	Chunky Move
2018	An Enemy of the People	Randine	Belvoir Theatre Company
2018	The Misanthrope	Eliante	Bell Shakespeare / Griffin Theatre Company
2018	Going Down	Natalie	STC / Malthouse Theatre, Melbourne
2019	White Pearl	Built	STC / National Theatre of Parramatta
2019	Angels in America	Harper	Old Fitzroy Theatre, Sydney with Apocalypse Theatre Company
2019	Titus Andronicus	Clown	Bell Shakespeare
2020	No Pay? No Way!	Margherita	STC
2021	Playing Beatie Bow	Abigail Kirk	Wharf Theatre with STC
2021	Honour		Ensemble Theatre, Sydney
2023	Sex Magick	Liraz	Griffin Theatre Company
2023	Constellations	Marianne	STC
2023	A Streetcar Named Desire	Stella	Redline Productions
2024	American Signs	The Consultant / Various characters	Wharf Theatre, Sydney with STC

=== As crew ===
Year	Title	Role	Notes
2010	Coming Undone	Assistant Director / Choreographer	Cabaret Salon Series (NYC)
