= Titanium discography =

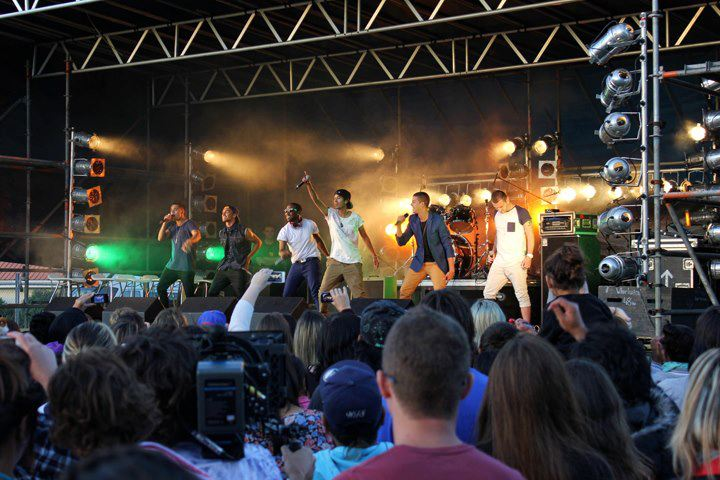
- Titanium performing in Sydney, Australia.
- Studio albums: 1
- Singles: 6
- Music videos: 5
- Promotional singles: 1

The discography of New Zealand boy band Titanium, formed in Auckland in 2012, consists of a studio album, six official singles and five music videos. They signed with record label, Illegal Musik after being formed by a local radio competition from The Edge. They subsequently signed with Warner Music. As of November 2012, Titanium have sold over twenty thousand singles.

The group's debut studio album All for You was released worldwide in December 2012. The leading single "Come On Home" was a national hit, reaching number one on the New Zealand Singles Chart and it has since been certified platinum by the Recording Industry Association of New Zealand (RIANZ). Subsequent singles "I Won't Give Up" and "Sky" both became top twenty hits in New Zealand. Titanium made history when they became the first New Zealand band to have three songs in the Top 40 Singles Chart at one time. In 2013, "Soundtrack to Summer" and "Tattoo" the succeeding singles, were moderate successes.

== Albums ==
List of studio albums, with selected chart positions, sales figures and certifications
Title	Album details	Peak chart positions	Sales	Certifications
Title	Album details	NZ	Sales	Certifications
All for You	Released: 7 December 2012; Labels: Illegal Musik, Warner Music; Formats: CD, digital download	8	NZ: 10,000	NZ: Gold

== Singles ==
List of singles as lead artist, with selected chart positions and certifications
Year	Title	Peak chart positions		Certifications	Album
Year	Title	NZ	AUS	Certifications	Album
2012	"Come On Home"	1	—	NZ: 2× Platinum	All for You
2012	"I Won't Give Up"	16	69		All for You
2012	"Sky"	12	—		All for You
2012	"For the First Time"	—	—		All for You
2013	"Soundtrack to Summer" (featuring Jupiter Project)	28	—		All for You 2.0
2013	"Tattoo"	9	—		All for You 2.0
2013	"Unarmed"	—	—		All for You 2.0
2014	"Take Us Back"	9	—		Non-album single
2014	"Heartache" (with Marcia Hines)	—	—		Marcia Hines album Amazing
2014	"—" denotes single that did not chart or was not released				

== Music videos ==
List of music videos, with director(s)
Title	Year	Director(s)
2012	"Come On Home"	Anthony Plant
2012	"I Won't Give Up"	Anthony Plant
2012	"Sky"	Shae Sterling
2012	"For the First Time"	Craig Gainsborough
2013	"Soundtrack to Summer"	Craig Gainsborough
