= Jordi Webber =

New Zealand actor and musician (born 1994)

- Webber in 2025
- Born: 25 May 1994 (age 32); Rotorua, New Zealand
- Occupations: Actor, musician
- Years active: 2012–present

Jordi Webber (born 25 May 1994) is a New Zealand actor and musician. He came to prominence as a member of the boyband Titanium, which was formed in 2012 as part of a competition run by The Edge radio station. The band's first single "Come On Home" debuted at number one on the New Zealand singles chart. Titanium later became the first New Zealand band to have three singles in the chart simultaneously. During this time, Webber was named Cleo Cruiser Bachelor of the Year.

He opted to stay in New Zealand when the band went to the United States and he officially left Titanium in 2014 to pursue solo music and acting careers. He released his first single "I'll Be Loving You" in September 2016. That same year, he was cast as Levi Weston, the Gold Ranger, in Power Rangers Ninja Steel. The series began airing in 2017. After finishing the promotional campaign for Power Rangers, Webber appeared in two webseries Oddly Even and Ao-Terror-oa.

Webber had a recurring role on the New Zealand soap opera Shortland Street as Jake Morris, and starred in the action-horror series The Dead Lands as Rangi. From 2020 until 2021, Webber starred as Constable Cruz Kingi in the rugby drama series Head High. Webber credited the show for helping him to reconnect with the Māori culture. Webber also debuted a musical alter-ego named Waazzoo and The Vibes and he released a self-titled EP in 2020, followed by the single "Juice and Lemonade" in 2021.

Webber's film roles include television film Together Forever Tea (2021), romantic holiday film Mistletoe Ranch (2022), and the Netflix interactive romantic comedy Choose Love. Webber joined the cast of Australian soap opera Home and Away as Kahu Parata in 2023. In 2024 he appeared in the Stan series Prosper, a drama set in the megachurch community.

== Early life ==
Webber was born and raised in Rotorua, along with his two brothers and sister. He was raised in the Mormon faith. He attended Rotorua Boys' High School, where he became head prefect and secured the Geyser Community Foundation Rotorua Boys' High School speech and drama scholarship. In 2010, Webber was runner-up in the Senior English section of the Ngā Manu Kōrero Speech Competition. He also appeared in a television advertisement for New World. Webber always wanted to be an actor and was studying a Bachelor of Performing Arts before he auditioned to be in a boyband.

== Career ==
=== Music ===
In 2012, Webber auditioned for a competition run by radio station The Edge to create a New Zealand boyband. He was selected along with Zac Taylor, Andrew Papas, Shaquille Paranihi-Ngauma, Haydn Linsley and T.K Paradza to form Titanium. Webber was 18 years old when he joined the band and he was the youngest member. Titanium's first single "Come On Home" debuted at number one on the New Zealand singles chart. Titanium released their debut studio album All for You in December 2012. They became the first New Zealand band to have three singles in the official New Zealand singles chart simultaneously. When the band went to the United States in 2013, Webber decided to stay in New Zealand. That same year he was named Cleo Cruiser Bachelor of the Year.

Webber left Titanium in 2014 and he pursued a solo music career. After receiving a funding grant from New Zealand On Air, he released his first single and music video called "I'll Be Loving You" on 30 September 2016. The following year, Webber released "Reasons", a song that helped raise suicide awareness. He also debuted his second single "Love You Forever", whose accompanying music video allowed him to utilise his acting career with stunts and storytelling. Webber also confirmed that he had recorded an album, which was due to be released in 2018. He cited Michael Jackson, Bruno Mars and The Weeknd as influences for the album's sound. Webber later debuted a musical alter-ego named Waazzoo and The Vibes and he released a self-titled EP in 2020. His single "Juice and Lemonade" was released the following year.

=== Acting ===
In addition to launching his solo music career, Webber also pursued a career in acting. In early 2017, Webber confirmed that he had joined the cast of Power Rangers Ninja Steel as Levi Weston, the Gold Ranger. Webber auditioned for the role in May 2016 and began filming in September that year. He described working on the show as "an awesome experience". Webber called his character "a special ranger", as he was not part of the original line-up. He was also a musician, which gave Webber an opportunity a chance to sing in the show. After finishing up the promotional campaign for Power Rangers Ninja Steel, Webber starred in the New Zealand dramedy webseries Oddly Even. The series marked Webber's first New Zealand project and he said it would have "quite a few laughs in it – quite quirky, like awkward humour." He also appeared in an episode of the anthology horror webseries Ao-Terror-oa. Webber later filmed a pilot for an action television show set during World War I.

In 2019, Webber recurred on New Zealand soap opera Shortland Street as Jake Morris, a prison inmate who had a relationship with nurse Dawn Karim (Rebekah Randell). The following year, saw the release of the eight-part action-horror The Dead Lands in which Webber stars as Rangi. The series is based on Toa Fraser's film of the same name. It was filmed in and around Auckland and was broadcast on US streaming service Shudder and TVNZ OnDemand. That same year, Webber starred as Tric in the webseries Nevernight, an adaptation of the book of the same name by Jay Kristoff. He also appeared in the Polynesian sketch comedy show SIS, and comedy series Millennial Jenny.

From 2020 until 2021, Webber starred as Constable Cruz Kingi in the New Zealand rugby drama series Head High. Webber was glad of the chance to play a "multi-layered character", stating "There was a long time there where I was mainly going for teen roles in high school kind of stuff, which is cool, but I think, deep down, we all want to move into those older, more mature roles." Producers increased Webber's role for the second series, as they focused on the police work of lead character Rene O'Kane, played by Miriama McDowell. Webber thought his character was both "relatable and approachable", while Kerry Harvey of Stuff believed Cruz was the show's "most culturally aware Māori character". Webber credited Head High for helping him reconnect with his culture.

In 2021, Webber appeared in the television film Together Forever Tea, co-starring fellow New Zealand actors Jay Ryan and Kim Crossman. He also appeared in the comedy miniseries Perfect People, and filmed a role in Taron Lexton's Nomad, which was shot across 26 countries and released in 2023. Webber stars alongside Mercy Cornwall the romantic holiday film Mistletoe Ranch, which was shot in Queensland, Australia in early 2022. He was also cast in the Netflix interactive romantic comedy Choose Love, written and produced by Josann McGibbon.

In 2023, Webber joined the cast of Australian soap opera Home and Away in the recurring role of Kahu Parata. Webber believed he was perfect for the role, as Kahu was billed as being "super free, super surfy and Māori". Webber was travelling around the east coast of Australia in a van at the time and felt that he had the right energy for the part. Webber appears alongside Rebecca Gibney and Richard Roxburgh in the Stan drama Prosper, which was filmed in New South Wales. The series focuses on the founder and pastor of a fictional Sydney megachurch and his family. Webber plays Benji, the American husband of Isabel (Hayley McCarthy), the family's only daughter.

In 2025, Webber joined the cast of the Starz series Spartacus: House of Ashur as a gladiator named Tarchon.

== Discography ==
=== Extended plays ===
Title	EP details
Waazzoo and The Vibes	Released: 18 September 2020; Formats: Digital download

=== Singles ===
Year	Single	Chart positions	Album
Year	Single	NZ	Album
2016	"I'll Be Loving You"	—	Non-album single
2017	"Love You Forever"	—	Non-album single
2018	"Hide and Seek"	—	Non-album single
2018	"Treat You Right"	—	Non-album single
2021	"Juice and Lemonade"	— (Note: "Juice and Lemonade" did not enter the NZ Top 40 Singles Chart, but peaked at number 12 on the Hot 20 NZ Singles Chart.)	Non-album single
"—" denotes releases that did not chart or receive certification

== Filmography ==
Film performances
Year	Title	Role	Notes
2021	Together Forever Tea	Joel	
2022	Mistletoe Ranch	James Hunt	
2023	Choose Love	Jack Menna	
TBA	Nomad	Ari	Post-production

Television performances
Year	Title	Role	Notes
2017–2018	Power Rangers Ninja Steel	Aiden Romero/Levi Weston/Ninja Steel Gold Ranger	Main cast
2017	Ao-Terror-oa	Anton	Webseries
2018	Oddly Even	Oscar	Webseries
2019	Shortland Street	Jake Morris	Recurring role
2019	Nevernight	Tric	Webseries
2020	The Dead Lands	Rangi	Main cast
2020	SIS	Orbit	Episode: "Pilot"
2020–2021	Head High	Cruz Kingi	Main cast
2020–2021	Millennial Jenny	JB	Episodes: "Hot Desking" and "Community Sound Bath"
2022	Perfect People	Jude	Miniseries
2023	Home and Away	Kahu Parata	Recurring role
2024	Prosper	Benji Kalani	Main cast
2025–2026	Spartacus: House of Ashur	Tarchon	Main cast
