= Sheena Chohan =

Indian actress

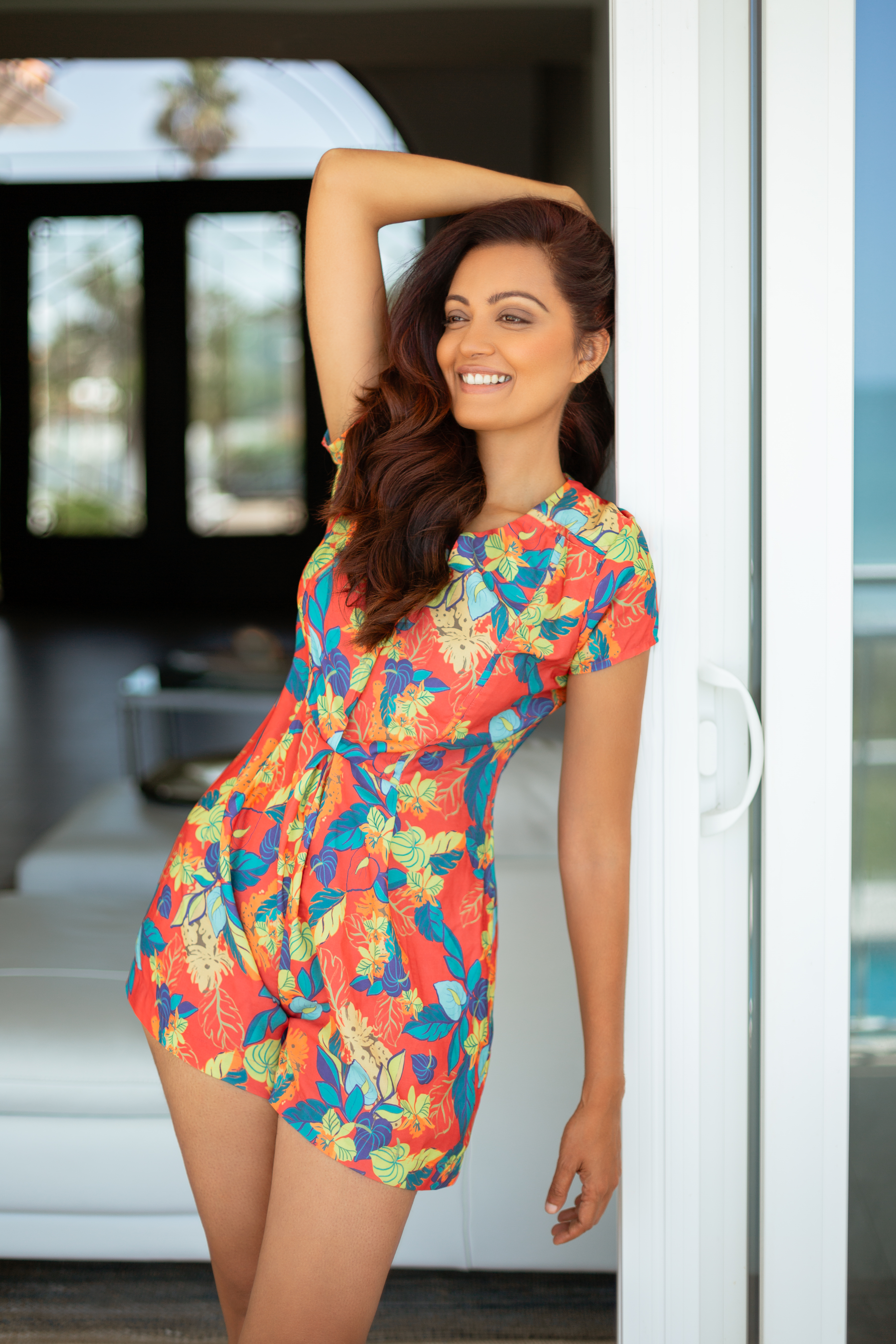
- Chohan in 2022
- Born: India, Chandigarh
- Occupation: Actress
- Website: www.sheenachohan.net

Sheena Chohan is an Indian film actress who works in Hindi, Malayalam, Tamil, Telugu and Hollywood films and OTT-series. She made her screen debut in the Malayalam film, The Train, opposite Mammooty, directed by seven-time National Award Winning Director, Jayaraj. Her major success came with Ant Story, on Netflix, which was directed by Mostofa Sarwar Farooki for which she received a best actress nomination alongside Keira Knightley and Kate Beckinsale at both the Dubai International Film Festival and the Shanghai International Film Festival. She is the only Indian actor to have won the Human Rights Hero award at the United Nations. Sheena Chohan is known as a Pan India Actor, for performing across multiple languages, her ability to seamlessly transform into diverse lead characters, and her reputation as a highly professional, director’s actor. Sheena made her Hindi film debut in Sant Tukaram (2025), playing Avali Jija Bai, the wife of the saint. Sheena recently won the Arts Ambassador Award for Global Artistic and Cultural Impact 2026.

== Career ==
Chohan starred as the female lead opposite megastar Mammootty in a Malayalam film The Train, directed by National Award Winner, Jayaraj.

She was nominated as Best Actress at both the Dubai International Film Festival and the Shanghai International Film Festival for her lead role in the international film Ant Story, directed by Mostofa Sarwar Farooki which was on Netflix.

Chohan starred in Mukti and Patralekha as a lead, directed by National Award Winner Buddhadev Dasgupta.

In 2016, she played one of the lead roles in the feature film, Justice, directed by Bappaditya Bandopadhyay.

Chohan acted in the role of a journalist in the 2017 Hollywood web comedy Words which also features American stand-up comedian and actor, Jim Meskimen.

In 2019, Chohan was selected to feature in the Hollywood film Nomad, by award-winning director Taron Lexton, releasing this year.

In 2022, she was featured in the hit series The Fame Game on Netflix opposite Madhuri Dixit as well as in The City of Dreams directed by Nagesh Kukunoor. She also played the lead in the comedy drama series exMates which was produced by Humaramovie and she finished shooting for the series The Trial opposite Kajol for Disney+ Hotstar.

In 2023, Chohan also finished shooting for Sant Tukaram as the leading lady, Avali, opposite Subodh Bhave, directed by Aditya Om.

In February 2023, Chohan won the WGF Best Actress in Comic Role award for her popular web series, Ex- Mates.

In December 2025, it was announced that Sheena will appear in the Tamil folk drama ‘Arjunanin Allirani,’ Lilith Tale ‘Bhaayava', written by B. Jeyamohan, directed by Vino Vikraman Pillai with music by Ilaiyaraaja.

== Early life ==
Chohan was born in Chandigarh, Punjab but brought up in Kolkata. She was crowned "Miss Kolkata" and participated in the beauty pageant I Am She–Miss Universe India, where she won the title "I Am Voice". Chohan worked as a theatre actress for many years, in various productions including for five years in Delhi with director Arvind Gaur. She trained as a contemporary dancer for many years and reached the status of brown belt in Karate while in school. She studied arts at The Lawrence School, Sanawar, Shimla. She also trained in playing the violin and was a part of the school orchestra.

== Filmography ==
Year	Title	Role	Director	Language	Notes
2011	The Train	Meera	Jayaraj	Malayalam	Opposite Mammootty
2013	Ant Story	Rima (Famous Actress)	Mostofa Sarwar Farooki	Bengali	World Premiered at DIFF 2013
2014	Mukti	Bela (Tagore's Daughter)	Buddhadev Dasgupta	Bengali	Based on Rabindranath Tagores poems.
2014	Patralekha	Wife (Lead Role)	Buddhadev Dasgupta	Bengali	Based on Rabindranath Tagores poems.
2026	Justice	Ghost (Lead Role)	Bappaditya Bandopadhyay	Bengali, English	
2025	Sant Tukaram	Avali (Lead Role)	Aditya Om	Hindi	
2026	Jhatasya Maranam Dhruvam	IPS Officer Anusha (Lead Role)	Shravan	Telugu	Trilingual- Pan India film. Alongside J. D. Chakravarthy
2026	Nomad	Traveller	Taron Lexton	English-Hollywood Film	
2026	Arjunanin Allirani	Alli Rani	Vino Vikraman Pillai	Tamil	Written by B. Jeyamohan with music by Ilaiyaraaja - in pre-production

== Short films ==
Year	Title	Role	Language	Production House
2017	Pinkathon	Lead Role	Hindi	Ogilvy
2017	Chhotu	Lead Role	Hindi	Muvizz.com
2017	Words	Journalist (Lead Role)	English	Sheena Chohan
2017	Rubbish	Lead Role	Hindi	Humaramovie.com
2018	Fallen Angel	Lead Role	English	Groovyfilms
2019	Taken For A Ride	Lead Role	English	Imperial Buddha
2023	Amar-Prem	Neha (Lead Role)	Hindi	Great India Film and Television
2024	Marziyan	Lead role	Hindi	Amerya Productions
2025	One More	Lead Role	Hindi	Jannat Movies

== Web series ==
Year	Title	Role	Director	Language	Platform	Ref
2021	The Fame Game	PR Manager	Bejoy Nambiar	Hindi	Netflix India	
2021	City of Dreams	Journalist	Nagesh Kukunoor	Hindi	Disney Hotstar	
2022	The Trial	Jasmin	Suparn Verma	Hindi	Disney Hotstar	IMDb
2022	ExMates	Shreya	Vaibhav Ameta	Hindi	Humaramovie	
2025	Bhayaavah	She Devil (Negative Lead)	Vikas Tiwari	Hindi	TBA	
2026	TBA	TBA (Negative Lead)	Pankaj Parashar	Hindi	TBA	

== Awards ==
Year	Award
2010	Miss Universe India - I am She 2010-"I am voice" (Best expression and audience connectivity)
	Lakme Miss Kolkata
	Cinderella Beauty and Talent, Kolkata
2010	Wild Card Entry Winner of Miss Universe India - I am She 2010, Mumbai
2013	Nominated as Best Actress for Ant Story at The Dubai International Film Festival 2013
2014	Nominated as Best Actress for Ant Story at The Shanghai International Film Festival 2014 (Golden Goblet Awards)
2019	Human Rights Hero Award 2019 at the United Nations as South Asia Ambassador for Youth for Human Rights (1st Indian to receive the award)
2020	Excellence in Leadership Award 2020 (as Human Rights South Asia Ambassador)
2020	Woman Super Achiever Award at the World Women's Leadership conference 2020
2023	Human Rights Hero Award at the United Nations in New York - February 2023
2023	WGF Best Actress in Comic Role award for Ex- Mates - February 2023
2024	US President's Lifetime Achievement Award (for her human rights education work) - June 2024
2024	Best Actress In a Comedy Role 2024
2024	Midday Most Promising Actor Award 2024
2024	Rising Star Award 2024 by Times Applaud
2024	Rising Star of the Year Award 2024 by Midday
2025	Dr Sarojini Naidu International Award- Best Actress for Sant Tukaram
2025	The United Nations Hero Award
2026	Best Actress Award for Sant Tukaram by the World Women Leadership Congress & Awards
2026	Cultural Leadership Award for advancing human rights by the World Women Leadership Congress
2026	Arts Ambassador Award for Global Artistic and Cultural Impact
2026	Best Actress at National Awards for Excellence 2026 for ‘Sant Tukaram’
2026	Best Actress in a Leading Role award at the Times Applaud Awards in Mumbai
