= Sana'a Shaik =

Australian actress

- Born: Durban, South Africa
- Education: Curtin University; University of Sydney
- Occupation: Actress
- Television: Dive Club; Class of '07

Sana'a Shaik is a South African born film and television actress based in Australia.

== Early life ==
Born in Durban, South Africa, she moved to Perth, Western Australia as a teenager and attended Curtin University. She later gained a master's degree in management at the University of Sydney. She worked for three years in finance before her acting career.

== Career ==
Shaik has appeared in the television series such as Reckoning, the Netflix series Dive Club and episode three of anthology series Summer Love. She also had roles in Jack Irish, and as Xanthe in the sci-fi climate change feature 2067. Shaik also worked on the Hangover-inspired feature film It Only Takes a Night. She was named a rising star by the Casting Guild of Australia in 2022.

Shaik appeared in 2023 Amazon Prime television series Class of '07 alongside Megan Smart and Emily Browning. She has an upcoming role in globe-trotting science fiction film Nomad alongside Leo Woodall.

== Personal life ==
She is a practising Muslim. She married in South Africa in 2022.

== Partial filmography ==
Key
†	Denotes works that have not yet been released

Year	Title	Role	Notes
2018	Jack Irish	Bollywood actress	
2019-2020	Reckoning	Lacey Diaz	3 episodes
2019	2067	Xanthe	
2021	Dive Club	Steve Harrison	12 episodes
2022	Summer Love	Nabilah	Episode 3
2023	Class of '07	Teresa	8 episodes
2023	It Only Takes a Night	Emma	
2023	Bump	Van	5 episodes
TBA	Nomad†	Nellie	Post-production
