= Take Us Back =

Take Us Back may refer to:

- "Take Us Back" (Alela Diane song), a 2009 song by Alela Diane
- "Take Us Back" (Titanium song), a 2014 song by New Zealand boyband Titanium
