= 2067 (film) =

- Theatrical release poster
- Directed by: Seth Larney
- Written by: Seth Larney; Additional writing: Dave Paterson
- Additional dialogue by: Gareth Davies
- Based on: a treatment by Gavin Scott Davis
- Produced by: Lisa Shaunessy; Jason Taylor; Kate Croser
- Starring: Kodi Smit-McPhee; Ryan Kwanten; Leeanna Walsman; Aaron Glenane; Deborah Mailman
- Cinematography: Earle Dresner
- Edited by: Sean Lahiff
- Music by: Kenneth Lampl; Kirsten Axelholm
- Production companies: Screen Australia; XYZ Films; Futurism Studios; South Australian Film Corporation; Adelaide Film Festival; Create NSW; Elevate Production Finance; Grumpy Sailor; Kojo Entertainment; Freedom Films; Arcadia
- Distributed by: Umbrella Entertainment
- Release date: 2 October 2020 (United States)
- Running time: 114 minutes
- Country: Australia
- Language: English

2067 is a 2020 Australian science fiction film directed and written by Seth Larney from a treatment by Gavin Scott Davis (itself from Larney's own idea), and starring Kodi Smit-McPhee and Ryan Kwanten. The film was a box office disappointment, and received generally negative reviews from critics.

== Plot ==
In the year 2067, Earth has been devastated by climate change, deforestation and an ongoing nuclear war. Only one city in the ruins of Australia has been able to hold out against these catastrophic changes, thanks to synthetic oxygen; but this oxygen is tainted and gradually causes a deadly affliction called "The Sickness".

Ethan Whyte cares for his wife Xanthe, who is afflicted with the Sickness. One day, Ethan is called before Regina Jackson, the Chronicorp CTO, who explains that the Sickness will eventually wipe out humanity. During a test of the "Chronical", a prototype time machine that quantum physicist Richard Whyte (Ethan's late father) had worked on before his death twenty years earlier, the scientists received a radio signal from 400 years in the future with a message to specifically send Ethan to them. In hopes of preventing the extinction of humankind, Ethan is asked to be sent into the future. He refuses, as he resents his father for abandoning him and his mother, but Xanthe and Ethan's guardian and colleague Jude manage to change his mind.

After surviving the traumatic time displacement, Ethan finds himself in a lush rainforest, with a hand computer named Archie and a wrist device given to him as a child by Richard as his only surviving pieces of equipment. He finds the entrance to a bunker-like structure, and a skeleton wearing his jumpsuit, a decaying Archie and the wrist device, and with a bullet hole in its skull. Shocked by the discovery of his apparent death in the near future, and sick from eating poisonous berries, Ethan is rescued by Jude, who followed him through time after his life readings, transmitted through the Chronical, were failing. After sharing their findings, they follow Archie's directions to another, still-functional door, which leads to the Chronical lab. Ethan's wrist device is revealed to be a DNA analyser specifically made to grant him access to the Chronical, which sets itself for automatic reactivation in four hours.

From a holographic recording left by Richard, the duo learns that the Chronical project originally entailed the reactivation of an atmospheric monitoring station which would ascertain the Earth atmosphere's breathability in the future and then transmit the data back to the past. When first activating the machine, Richard was surprised to receive a message to send his own son to the future, so despite his misgivings, he prepared Ethan's wrist analyser. However, an immediate follow-up mission was rendered impossible because safely sending living matter through time required an operational link from both sides and the data showed a power failure in 2474.

The Chronical's activation triggers a malfunction in its nuclear power core, threatening to unleash a nuclear explosion before the countdown is completed. Ethan and Jude make their way to the power core, which is located beneath the overgrown ruins of their home city. Finding the ruins littered with skeletons, including Xanthe's, they conclude that a cure against the Sickness was never found. When Jude attempts to comfort him, Ethan recognizes Jude's voice from a recording he found on the decaying Archie, taken moments before his future self was killed. Claiming that he's saving Ethan from himself, Jude directs Ethan at gunpoint to the reactor's control room. Unable to activate the emergency override, Ethan decides to go inside of the airlock and pull the lever.

With 37 minutes to spare, the duo return to the Chronical lab, where Ethan finds another exit that opens the entryway next to his skeleton. Ethan suffers a nervous breakdown and implores Jude to kill him, which Jude refuses to do. Jude then confesses that there was no actual hope of ever changing the future. Refusing to believe that, Ethan locks Jude in a room and plays back his father's log from the day that Richard died. Ethan learns that his mission was a sham from the beginning: Jackson intended to flee from her dying time into the future with a chosen few, while Ethan’s late father Richard maintained hope for humankind. To prevent its abuse, Richard had already keyed the time machine to Ethan's DNA, but when Richard's colleague announced that the machine could be rigged to send a person into the future one-way, Jackson killed Richard. Jude was appointed by Jackson as Ethan's guardian to ensure that he would be sent forward in time to repair the power failure and stabilise the time portal; once Ethan returned to 2067, Jackson would have him killed.

Ethan tries to shut the Chronical down, but Jude moves to stop him. When Ethan refuses to fight him, Jude, guilt-ridden, commits suicide. Just before Jackson can put her plans in motion, Ethan sends the "Send Ethan Whyte" message, a copy of Richard's recorded murder on Archie, hundreds of live jungle plants, and a farewell gift to Xanthe into the past. Then he destroys the Chronical, which changes the timeline: In the past, Jackson is arrested after Archie transmits the recording to a news station, and the plants are used to revitalize the planet. In the future, Ethan's corpse is gone, and Ethan discovers his formerly ruined city inhabited and advanced with architecture more harmonious with the environment.

== Cast ==
- Kodi Smit-McPhee as Ethan Whyte
  - Finn Little as Young Ethan Whyte
- Ryan Kwanten as Jude Mathers
- Sana'a Shaik as Xanthe Whyte, Ethan's wife.
- Aaron Glenane as Dr. Richard Whyte, Ethan's estranged father.
- Deborah Mailman as Regina Jackson
- Leeanna Walsman as Selene Whyte
- Damian Walshe-Howling as Billy Mitchell
- Natasha Wanganeen as Government Official

== Production ==
South African-born director Larney grew up in Australia, in an off-grid home near Grafton, New South Wales built by his impressionist painter father. Larney had done some post-production and visual effects work on The Matrix sequels (The Matrix Reloaded) and X-Men Origins: Wolverine, before directing his first feature, the Malaysian action film Tombiruo (2017). 2067 is his first feature film in Australia, which he says is absolutely about hope. He says he had been developing the idea since 2005, when he was 25 years old. Making this film, he was inspired by the films of Stanley Kubrick, Terry Gilliam, Duncan Jones, and Denis Villeneuve. He had previously directed short films The Clearing and Roman’s Ark.

The film received funding from Screen Australia, the South Australian Film Corporation, Adelaide Film Festival Investment Fund and Screen NSW.

Filming took place in Orange, New South Wales and Adelaide Studios. Production design is by Jacinta Leong and the film is produced by Lisa Shaunessy (Arcadia), Jason Taylor (Futurism Studios) and Kate Croser (Kojo) produced the film.

== Release ==
The film was released in the US on 2 October 2020, screening at 15 cinemas as well as online.

The film's Australian premiere was at the Adelaide Film Festival's opening night on 14 October 2020, where it was shown simultaneously in seven cinemas due to high demand (albeit with spaced seating owing to COVID-19 pandemic social distancing rules).

== Reception ==
In the days following its release in the US, the film ranked fourth on the US iTunes digital chart.

On Rotten Tomatoes the film has an approval rating of 32% based on reviews from 31 critics, with an average of 4.9/10. On Metacritic the film has a score of 39 out of 100 based on reviews from eight critics, indicating "generally unfavorable reviews".

Brian Tallerico of RogerEbert.com awarded the film two out of four stars: "Larney fails his own idea by not having a stronger edit on his dialogue and a more confident hand when it comes to directing performance." Dennis Harvey of Variety wrote, "You can tell 2067 has some rather lofty aspirations. But its ways of realizing them are too frequently pedestrian, from the vanal dialogue to the notion that our savior might ultimately need reassuring that daddy really loved him."

Jake Kleinman of Inverse titled his review "The best time travel movie since Avengers: Endgame", with the byline "Blade Runner meets Walkabout in this bold new cyberpunk thriller with a climate change message", writing that it delivers a time travel twist on a par with Christopher Nolan's best work. John DeFore of The Hollywood Reporter wrote that it "has a couple of interesting ideas up its sleeve but doesn't know how to reveal them". Germain Lussier of Gizmodo called it a "mixed bag", "impressive from a technical standpoint", with a powerful score by Kirsten Axelholm and Kenneth Lampl, and although it does not live up to its huge ambitions, it is fun to watch and full of interesting ideas and plot twists.
