= Sky (Titanium song) =

Single by Titanium

from the album All For You
- Released: 2 November 2012
- Recorded: 2012 (Auckland)
- Genre: Pop, dance
- Length: 3:43
- Label: Illegal Musik, Warner Music
- Songwriters: Vince Harder, Inoke Finau, Mark Arona, Zac Taylor, Haydn Linsley and T.K Paradza
- Producer: Finau

Titanium singles chronology
"I Won't Give Up" (2012)	"Sky" (2012)	"For The First Time" (2012)

Music video
- "Sky" on YouTube

"Sky" is a song by New Zealand boy band Titanium, from their debut studio album All For You (2012). It is the album's third single and was released by Illegal Musik on Friday, 2 November 2012. "Sky" premiered on radio station, The Edge on Thursday, 1 November. The song was made available for pre order via iTunes. "Sky" is an uptempo pop dance song written by Vince Harder.

"Sky" has received positive reviews from music critics, commending its chorus, catchy melody and rap verse.

== Chart performance ==
On the official New Zealand Singles Chart it debuted at number 12 on Monday, 12 November 2012.

== Music video ==
The music video for "Sky" was directed by Shae Sterling. The music video premiered both on YouTube and music request show, Four Live at 5.25pm November 20, 2012. The video features the band performing on a spaceship on a journey through space, while dancing with their lovers. The video was shot using the Panasonic Lumix DMC-GH3 camera.

== Live Performances ==
Titanium performed "Sky" for the first time on Good Morning on Monday, 3 December 2012.

== Track listing ==
- Digital download
1. "Sky" – 3:43
- CD single
1. "Sky" – 3:43

== Charts and Certifications ==
Chart (2012)	Peak Position
New Zealand Singles (RIANZ)	12

== Release History ==
Region	Date	Format	Label
New Zealand	2 November 2012	Digital Download	Illegal Musik
Australia	4 March 2013	Digital Download	WHK Music Limited
