= The Dead Lands (TV series) =

Māori-language television series

The Dead Lands is a Māori language horror television series based on the film of the same name. In 2019, AMC Networks' streaming service Shudder and TVNZ said they would create a TV series based on the film The Dead Lands. The first two episodes of The Dead Lands premiered on 23 January 2020 on Shudder's platforms. It also aired on TVNZ OnDemand in New Zealand immediately after its international debut. Subsequent episodes premiered on both Shudder and TVNZ OnDemand weekly.

== Cast ==
- Darneen Christian as Mehe
- Te Kohe Tuhaka as Waka Nuku Rau
- Jordi Webber as Rangi

== Episodes ==
No.	Title	Directed by	Written by	Original release date	Viewers (millions)
1	"Tell the Dead I'm Coming"	Unknown	Unknown	23 January 2020	N/A
2	"The Sins of the Father"	Unknown	Unknown	23 January 2020	N/A
3	"The Kingdom at the Edge of the World"	Unknown	Unknown	30 January 2020	N/A
4	"The Exorcism of the Boy"	Unknown	Unknown	6 February 2020	N/A
5	"Generational Warfare"	Unknown	Unknown	13 February 2020	N/A
6	"A Question of Identity"	Unknown	Unknown	20 February 2020	N/A
7	"Broken Promises"	Unknown	Unknown	27 February 2020	N/A
8	"The Sacrifice of Innocence"	Unknown	Unknown	5 March 2020	N/A

== See also ==
- The Dead Lands
