= George Pullar =

Australian actor

- Born: 1995 or 1996 (age 30–31); Brisbane, Australia
- Occupation: Actor
- Years active: 2016–present

George Pullar (born 1995/1996) is an Australian actor.

== Early life and education ==
Pullar was born in 1995 or 1996 in Brisbane with a twin sister, Annie (later a Nine Network news reporter). Their mother originated from Adelaide and he has two other siblings.

Pullar wanted to pursue a football career during his childhood, inspired by his uncle's background in the AFL. He played for a children's club in Coorparoo before the family moved to Indooroopilly. He then played for the Kenmore Australian Football Club where he decided that football would be unsuitable for him moving forward following a knee injury.

Pullar attended Brisbane Grammar School and in his final two years was required to choose an additional subject. His mother convinced him to study drama and he then realised he had a "natural ease" for acting. Due to his knee injury Pullar had the time to participate in a school theatrical performance. His drama teacher was impressed and encouraged Pullar to audition for a place at the Western Australian Academy of Performing Arts. He was successful and moved to Perth to begin his training.

During his time studying at WAAPA, Pullar and fellow students created a series of plays on old age. They researched them through a partnership with Catholic Homes which allowed them to visit the elderly in care homes. He also played the lead role of Vicomte de Valmont in a theatre performance of Dangerous Liaisons, which toured Hong Kong.

== Career ==
Pullar began his professional acting career by starring in the short film Riptide (2016). He also starred in another short film titled Two Girls, One on Each Knee as the Gentleman. In 2017, it was announced that Pullar had been cast in the fifth season of the Australian drama series A Place to Call Home, playing mechanic Larry Forbes. His performance gained him a nomination for the "Subscription Television Award for Best New Talent" at the 7th AACTA Awards.

Pullar had also secured the role of Private Jarrod Vogel in the television series Fighting Season. The drama focuses on the lives of a group of soldiers after they return from duty in Afghanistan. Pullar and his co-stars participated in an army boot camp run by current and former servicemen to prepare for filming; among the skills they practiced were "weapon familiarisation, weapon drills, approaching buildings, working as a group". The filming schedules for Fighting Season and A Place to Call Home overlapped, but was allowed to take part in both because they were both commissioned by Foxtel.

In May 2018, it was announced that he had secured the regular role of Daniel Fletcher in the Network Ten drama series Playing for Keeps. The show is about a group of AFL players and their wives' personal lives. That year the actor travelled to the US to pursue his career and signed with the Los Angeles management Silver Lining Entertainment. The Casting Guild of Australia chose Pullar as one of the ten recipients of the Rising Stars award for their 2018 ceremony.

In 2019, Pullar secured the lead role of Tyler in his first feature film Moon Rock For Monday, directed by Kurt Martin and produced by Jim Robison, which was released in August 2020. The film was nominated for the 2021 AACTA Award for Best Indie Film.

In February 2020, it was announced that Pullar had secured his first role in the United States. He signed up to play Garrett Cox in the Paramount Network drama series Coyote. A casting director invited Pullar to audition for the role after viewing his audition tapes. He only received the role via a virtual audition broadcast from an underground hotel. He also voiced the character Bradley Burrows in the animation movie Combat Wombat, which was released in October 2020. Pullar appeared in a second season of Playing For Keeps but it was later cancelled. Pullar later revealed that he intended to leave the show if more series were planned.

In 2021, Pullar completed filming a role in the movie It Only Takes a Night, alongside Eliza Taylor. In 2022, Pullar released a short film titled Stonefish, which he wrote and appeared in. The film was screened as part of "Flickerfest's Best of Australian Shorts" which toured nationally. He also appeared in the ABC drama series Barons, playing the character of Bernie Hunter Jr. Then came the role of Carl in an episode of Acorn TV's Darby and Joan. In 2023, Pullar appeared as UK advisor Ben Barber in the series North Shore. He also had a guest role in an episode of Stan comedy series C*A*U*G*H*T.

In 2024, Pullar filmed the role of Malagor in the fantasy horror film Dusk, which was later retitled Deathkeeper. That year, Pullar also joined the cast of the comedy crime drama, Deadloch, playing Ben during the second series. Also in 2024, Pullar joined the cast of the soap opera, Home and Away playing the role of Tim Russell. The character is portrayed as a counsellor and was introduced as a new love interest of Eden Fowler played by Stephanie Panozzo. In 2025, Pullar was cast in the feature film, Posthumous. He also filmed a role in the film, Evil Dead Burn. In November 2025, Pullar played Daniel A. Kaffee in the stage show, A Few Good Men at Queensland's QPAC.

== Filmography ==
=== Film ===
Year	Title	Role	Notes
2016	Riptide	Matt	Short film
2016	Two Girls, One on Each Knee	Gentleman	Short film
2020	Moon Rock For Monday	Tyler	Film
2020	Combat Wombat	Bradley Burrows	Film
2022	Stonefish	Jonathon	Short film
2023	It Only Takes a Night	Andy	Film
2026	Evil Dead Burn	William "Will" Price	Film
TBA	Deathkeeper	Malagor	Film
2026	Posthumous	Young Neil	Film

=== Television ===
Year	Title	Role	Notes
2017	A Place to Call Home	Larry Forbes	Recurring role
2018	Of Fish and Foe	Himself	Documentary
2018–19	Playing for Keeps	Daniel Fletcher	Regular role
2018	Fighting Season	Jarrod 'Toast' Vogel	Regular role
2020	Coyote	Garrett Cox	Recurring role
2022	Barons	Bernie Hunter Jr	Regular role
2022	Darby and Joan	Carl	Guest role
2023	North Shore	Ben Barber	Regular role
2023	C*A*U*G*H*T	Gunnery Sergeant	Guest role
2024–25	Home and Away	Tim Russell	Guest role
2026	Deadloch	Ben	Guest role

== Awards and nominations ==
Year	Association	Category	Nominated work	Result
2017	AACTA Awards	Subscription Television Award for Best New Talent	A Place to Call Home (Season 5)	Nominated
2018	CGA Awards	Rising Stars Award	N/A	Won
2021	Australian Screen Industry Network Awards	Best Actor	Moon Rock For Monday	Won
2022	AACTA Awards	Best Short Film	Stonefish	Nominated
