= It Only Takes a Night =

2023 romantic comedy film by directed Callan Durlik

- Directed by: Callan Durlik
- Written by: Callan Durlik
- Produced by: Callan Durlik; Josh Horneman; Kara Pisconeri
- Starring: Eliza Taylor; George Pullar; Sana'a Shaik; Arielle Carver-O'Neill; Ana Ika; Charles Grounds; Jaime Ureta
- Cinematography: Jim Frater
- Edited by: Stuart Campbell
- Music by: Helena Czajka
- Production company: A Touch of Madness Studios
- Distributed by: Screen Australia; Myriad Pictures
- Release date: August 15, 2023
- Running time: 94 minutes
- Country: Australia
- Language: English

It Only Takes a Night is a 2023 Australian romantic comedy film written and directed by Callan Durlik in his feature directorial debut. The film stars Eliza Taylor (who also executive produced) and also features George Pullar, Sana'a Shaik, Arielle Carver-O'Neill, Ana Ika, Charles Grounds and Jaime Ureta. Filmed in Perth in April 2021, It Only Takes a Night follows four best friends on a girls’ night out in London.

The film was released by Screen Australia in Australia and New Zealand on August 15, 2023. Internationally, it was released by Myriad Pictures.

== Cast ==
- Eliza Taylor as Ruby Allen
- George Pullar as Andy
- Sana'a Shaik as Emma
- Blake Richardson as Angus
- Arielle Carver-O'Neill as Sophie
- Ana Ika as Nina
- Charles Grounds as Sven
- Jaime Ureta as Francesco
- Chloe Ng as Jasmine
- Mahesh Jadu as Jeffrey D. Phillips
- Clara Helms as Elisha
- Tom O'Sullivan as Gavin
- Megan Aspinall as Kate
- Megan Hollier as Jessie

== Reception ==
Film critic Erin Free from FilmInk gave it a positive review praising performances of four leads.

At the 2023 Western Australia Screen Culture Awards It Only Takes a Night received nomination for a Narrative Feature Film with budget over $1m.
