= Gnomes (TV series) =

- Genre: Comedy horror
- Created by: Joel Kohn
- Written by: Tegan Higginbotham; Paul F. Verhoeven
- Directed by: Sian Davies; Joel Kohn
- Country of origin: Australia
- Original language: English
- No. of seasons: 1
- No. of episodes: 6

Production
- Executive producer: Matthias Hoene
- Producers: Joel Kohn; John Molloy; Richard Kelly
- Production company: Total Fiction

Original release
- Network: Stan
- Release: 8 October 2026 – present

Gnomes is a comedy horror series for Stan which premiered on 8 October 2026. Produced by Total Fiction, the series follows Sergeant Kipps who is having the worst day of his life when he has to shut down the local police station after the angry Gnome Queen is awakened by dark forces, and Kipps and his former partner Mackay must reunite to save Nompton.

== Plot ==
In the Victorian town of Nompton, Senior Sergeant Arnold Kipps' police station is about to be shut down by his former girlfriend and work partner, Ellie McKay. The town's annual tourist festival is about to begin, but a bloodthirsty Gnome Queen awakens an ancient evil, unleashing an army of murderous garden gnomes across the town. As the town descends into chaos, Arnold and Ellie must rally with a ragtag crew of cops, teens and an overly ambitious mayor, using unconventional weapons and sheer desperation to stop the Gnome Queen before her killer lawn ornaments tear the town apart.

== Cast ==
- Asa Butterfield as Senior Sergeant Arnold Kipps
- Megan Smart as Ellie Mackay
- Tess Haubrich as Gnome Queen
- Darren Gilshenan as Mayor Lachlan Morrison
- Alison Whyte as Susan Fields
- Matt Okine as Devon
- Tegan Higginbotham as Josie
- Nicole Guasekharam as Beverly Hills
- Brett Tucker as Harvey Poll
- Oliver Edis as Zayn
- Leigh Lule as Jenny
- George Rayias as Dylan
- Mila Hourmouzis as Rosie

== Production ==
On 18 February 2025, the series was announced by Stan with funding secured from Screen Australia and VicScreen. The series was created by Joel Kohn and produced by John Molloy and Richard Kelly, and co-produced with Happy Accidents and Total Fiction.

The series was one of 14 commissions that were announced by Stan for their tenth year.

On 4 June 2025, the series officially entered production in Melbourne, with Asa Butterfield and Megan Smart as series leads. The series was filmed on location across Melbourne and the town of Warburton.

On 3 June 2026, it was announced that Disney+ had secured a distribution deal for the series to air in the UK and Ireland.
