= Nomad (upcoming film) =

American science fiction film

- Directed by: Taron Lexton
- Written by: Taron Lexton
- Produced by: Nathan Lorch; Milena Ferreira; Taron Lexton
- Starring: Leo Woodall; Sheena Chohan; Jordi Webber; Abbey Hoes; Sana'a Shaik
- Cinematography: Kevin Garrison
- Edited by: Alexa Vier
- Music by: Edy Lan
- Production company: TXL Productions
- Country: United States
- Language: English

Nomad is an upcoming American science fiction film written and directed by Taron Lexton and starring Leo Woodall. It was shot between 2019 and 2025 in a reported 30 countries, over seven continents.

== Premise ==
A mysterious loner (Woodall) has a bizarre condition that takes him to another place on Earth every 12 hours, with no ability to control his destinations.

== Cast ==
- Leo Woodall
- Sheena Chohan
- Jordi Webber
- Abbey Hoes
- Sana'a Shaik

== Production ==
The film is produced by TXL Pixtures and written and directed by Taron Lexton. The producers are Nathan Lorch and Milena Ferreira, with co-producer Nick Lane, associate producer Nicole Jones, and executive producer Brandon Marion. It was shot on IMAX with cinematography by Kevin Garrison. It broke the record for the number of countries where a single production was filmed, previously held by The Fall (2006) by Tarsem Singh filmed in 25 countries. Lexton envisaged a film with "no green screen, no sets, and no lights" to have "an authenticity and resonance". Music is by Edy Lan.

=== Casting ===
Leo Woodall and Sheena Chohan were cast in 2019. The cast also includes a number of indigenous people and non-actors, as well as Sana'a Shaik, Jordi Webber, and Abbey Hoes. Webber's part has been described as the villain’s role.

=== Filming ===
The first day of principal photography was in July 2019 in Elqui Valley, Chile during the only solar eclipse of 2019; the production had just over two minutes to capture the desired shot. Other locations included Brazil, Tanzania, Egypt and India. The film crew had to navigate Drake Passage, considered one of the world's most dangerous water passages, and encountered a territorial rhinoceros in Southern Africa that required the local San people to protect them. Filming in Vancouver was interrupted by the COVID-19 pandemic in 2020. Actress Abbey Hoes has discussed filming her scenes on the Faroe Islands, and actress Sana'a Shaik discussed filming in China. Filming was reported to be completed in March 2023.
