= Class of '07 =

2023 Australian streaming television series

- Promotional poster
- Genre: Comedy; Apocalyptic; Survival
- Created by: Kacie Anning
- Written by: Romina Accurso; Kacie Anning; Gretel Vella
- Directed by: Kacie Anning
- Starring: Emily Browning; Megan Smart; Caitlin Stasey
- Music by: Bryony Marks
- Country of origin: Australia
- Original language: English
- No. of seasons: 1
- No. of episodes: 8

Production
- Executive producers: Mimi Butler; Kacie Anning; Debbie Lee; Alastair McKinnon
- Producer: Mimi Butler
- Cinematography: Bruce Young
- Editors: Rodrigo Balart; Geoff Hitchins
- Running time: 30 minutes
- Production companies: Matchbox Pictures; Universal International Studios

Original release
- Network: Prime Video
- Release: March 17, 2023

Class of '07 is an Australian apocalyptic survival comedy streaming television series created by Kacie Anning, and starring Emily Browning, Megan Smart, and Caitlin Stasey. It premiered on Prime Video on March 17, 2023. It received largely positive reviews which notably praised its humor, characters and cast performances (especially those of Browning, Smart and Stasey).

== Synopsis ==
An apocalyptic tidal wave hits during the 10-year reunion of an all-girls high school. The group has to find a way to survive on the island peak of their old high school campus, while dealing with old high school drama.

== Cast ==
- Emily Browning as Zoe Miller
- Megan Smart as Amelia Collins
- Caitlin Stasey as Saskia Van Der Beek
- Claire Lovering as Genevieve Tuke
- Emma Horn as Renee Williams
- Steph Tisdell as Phoebe Stewart
- Sana'a Shaik as Teresa Almas (née Al'Amin)
- Rose Flanagan as Laura Cunningham
- Chi Nguyen as Megan Vu
- Bernie Van Tiel as Tegan Florres
- Sarah Krndija as Sandy Cooper-Reid
- Debra Lawrance as Sister Bicky
- Rosaleen Cox as Sarah K
- Julia Savage as Young Zoe
- Holly Simon as Young Amelia
- Shay Cohen as Young Saskia

== Episodes ==
No.	Title	Directed by	Written by	Original release date
1	"Bird Shit"	Kacie Anning	Kacie Anning	March 17, 2023
Zoe appears on Australian dating show The Match. When she is rejected she goes on a rant against the man rejecting her culminating in her releasing a dove which accidentally defecates in her open mouth. The moment goes viral leading Zoe to cut herself off from society for 6 months staying on an isolated property her father owns. When water suddenly starts bursting from the ground Zoe seeks higher ground and accidentally stumbles across her ten-year high school reunion. The other women believe that Zoe's warnings about the flash flooding are another example of her dramatics and ignore her with disastrous consequences.
2	"Pancake Rage"	Kacie Anning	Kacie Anning	March 17, 2023
The group of survivors try to come up with a plan. Zoe is on the outs after everyone has discovered she knew about the flash flooding and failed to adequately warn them. She repeatedly attempts to aid in the groups scavenging efforts but her attempts continually put her at odds with the group. As the women descend into chaos Amelia begs Saskia to channel her inner bitch and lead the group but her plea has unintended consequences.
3	"Dumb Dumbs"	Kacie Anning	Kacie Anning	March 17, 2023
Now in charge Saskia divides the women into two groups, one led by Amelia, that works to secure electricity and one led by Saskia herself to dig latrines. Meanwhile Saskia hands Zoe the assignment of covering up Sandy's disappearance so the women have closure.
4	"Soul-Crushing-Cycle"	Kacie Anning	Romina Accurso	March 17, 2023
The women set up a system to produce batteries which they exchange for food and goods. Phoebe, who has discovered Saskia is responsible for Sandy's disappearance, blackmails her into producing extra batteries for her. The work pushes Saskia to the brink and she begins to remember her time at the school where she was groomed by a married teacher. Zoe causes an accident leading Phoebe to discover Renee's secret.
5	"The People Vs Saskia"	Kacie Anning	Romina Accurso	March 17, 2023
Saskia is set to be punished for Sandy's murder until Amelia demands a trial and steps forward to defend her. The trial descends into chaos as everyone holds a grudge against Saskia for her adolescent bullying. Meanwhile Zoe seeks to conceal her part in Sandy's disappearance.
6	"Utopia"	Kacie Anning	Kacie Anning	March 17, 2023
Sister Bicky takes charge of the women and has them unearth their time capsules. Amelia finally reveals why she left school early. And Saskia forces Sister Bicky to confess that she knew she was being groomed. As secrets are revealed the women work together to overcome their past regrets.
7	"Party Like it's 1999"	Kacie Anning	Gretel Vella	March 17, 2023
Sandy returns and informs the group of Zoe's role pushing her out into the water. She also reveals there are no survivors out at sea. Upset by the news Amelia and the other women freeze Zoe out but decide that life is no longer worth living. Amelia encourages them to throw a massive party before committing mass suicide. Zoe tries to stop them but is unable to until she discovers Sandy's secret and the reason why she is so desperate to capture Teresa.
8	"The Tribe Has Spoken"	Kacie Anning	Kacie Anning	March 17, 2023
Most of the women leave the next morning, going out to sea after discovering that human life persists. The remaining group, with no food left, decides they will eat someone. At a tribal council, Teresa is the first choice, but she plays the soon-to-be mother card, resulting in Megan being chosen. When Amelia later volunteers, Zoe immediately knocks her out and tells the others to start preparations. She then sneaks off to place Amelia on the last working boat. Amelia finally admits that Zoe is her friend, and they leave together. Just then, the others are excited when a boat with six young men arrives on the far side of the island. However, when the lads announce they are horny and hungry, the ladies prepare for a fight to the death. The series ends with Zoe and Amelia sailing across the water.

== Production ==
Class of '07 was first announced on May 18, 2021. On December 13, 2021, it was reported that production had begun in Australia, through Matchbox Pictures, starring Emily Browning, Caitlin Stasey, and Megan Smart. The all-female ensemble comedy series was created, written, and directed by Kacie Anning. It was filmed in and around Sydney.

== Release ==
The eight-part, 30-minute series premiered on Prime Video on March 17, 2023.

== Reception ==
Anna Govert of Paste called the series "a brutal and raw examination of womanhood and the aftereffects of high school, a love letter to female friendships, and a raunchy and rowdy good time to boot." Katie Cunningham of The Guardian gave it 3 out of 5 stars, calling the cast "utterly charming" and concluding that the series "finds its rhythm as it gets further along."

== See also ==
- List of Australian television series
