= I Won't Give Up =

2012 single by Jason Mraz

Single by Jason Mraz

from the album Love Is a Four Letter Word
- Released: January 3, 2012
- Recorded: 2011
- Genre: Folk blues; pop
- Length: 4:00 (album version); 3:50 (radio edit)
- Label: Atlantic
- Songwriters: Jason Mraz; Michael Natter
- Producer: Joe Chiccarelli

Jason Mraz singles chronology
"Lucky" (2009)	"I Won't Give Up" (2012)	"Distance" (2012)

Music video
- I Won't Give Up on YouTube

"I Won't Give Up" is a song by American singer-songwriter Jason Mraz. It was released as the first official single from his fourth studio album, Love Is a Four Letter Word, on December 26, 2011, via iTunes. It was written by Mraz and Michael Natter, and produced by Joe Chiccarelli.

The acoustic folk blues and folk-pop ballad was written during his activist outings and discusses not giving up on loving someone, loving oneself, and not giving up on one's dreams. It received mostly positive reviews from music critics, who agreed that the song is straightforward, emotional and inspiring.

The song was also a success on the charts, debuting at number 8 on the Billboard Hot 100 chart, becoming his second top-ten single, after "I'm Yours" (2008). Internationally, the song achieved large success, reaching top-ten positions in Ireland and Netherlands, while reaching top-twenty positions in Austria, Canada, the United Kingdom and more.

== Background ==
After "I'm Yours" remained at the Billboard Hot 100 chart for a record 76 weeks ending in October 2009 (peaking at number 6), Mraz headed to the Gulf of Mexico during the summer of 2010 to help with efforts to clean the Deepwater Horizon oil spill. Later, he went to a trip to Ghana to fight child slavery alongside the nonprofit organization Free the Slaves. Later, Mraz was in Antarctica, spending time with Al Gore and learning about climate change aboard the National Geographic Explorer. During his activist outings, Mraz wrote and recorded his fourth album, Love Is a Four Letter Word, with producer Joe Chiccarelli. In an interview for Billboard, he confessed that he was less interested in following up his biggest hit than using the power that "I'm Yours" gave him to fuel positive change. He further elaborated: "The pressure I put on myself, or what I hope my 'I Won't Give Up' does, is to make a difference in people's lives . . . With 'I'm Yours,' I got to go out and set my feet on different continents, and expose myself to different cultures and causes. I wanted to see who I was, outside of music."

Mraz explained the track, in a "track-by-track" commentary for Billboard:

"'I Won't Give Up' was written selfishly. As many of my songs are, I write for the purpose of understanding what the hell's going on in my life, my position in the world, processing that lesson and that miracle that I'm learning. Seeing it on the page, proving to myself that I understand the lesson, that I'm applying it to my life, and that I can move on. Ultimately it was about, you know, regardless of what happens in this relationship, I don't have to give up on loving this person, or loving myself, or give up on whatever my dreams are. Even though it's written through the filter of relationships, it's not necessarily specific for relationships. For me, the true meaning exists in the bridge saying 'I don't want to be someone who walks away so easily, I'm here to stay and make a difference.' That is for all of us. We all have something that we're fighting for or that we're striving for. Whether we want to coach our soccer team to victory or lose five pounds in a month, whatever it is, there's nothing too small worth fighting for and there's nothing too big worth going after."

== Composition ==
"I Won't Give Up" (2012)
A 25 second sample of "I Won't Give Up".

"I Won't Give Up" was written by Jason Mraz and Michael Natter, while production was handled by Joe Chiccarelli. The acoustic folk blues and folk-pop ballad features a slower tempo and a sparse arrangement written in the key of E major. Lyrically, it is a poignant ode to a long-lasting relationship, which Mraz says he won't give up on her whatever happens. "Well, I won't give up on us/Even if the skies get rough/I'm giving you all my love/I'm still looking up," he sings. It is guitar led with some additional vocal landscapes towards the end of the song. Mraz told Billboard magazine: "That, to me, has always been my favorite part of making music; the singing and what voices can do and the voices singing in harmony." It is likely that the song was inspired by Mraz's relationship with singer-songwriter Tristan Prettyman. Mraz showcases his light and versatile range singing from B2 to G#4.

== Critical reception ==
The song received generally favorable reviews. David Greenwald of MTV wrote, "The fresh track's wispy acoustic guitars and patient melody remind us of Irish crooner Damien Rice's 'Delicate,' though when Mraz soars into the chorus, it's with his own signature full-blast hook." Loh Chuan Junn of MSN Music wrote that "The string-drenched, acoustic-guitar-based sound makes for easy listening, and gets into the listener's head after just the first listen. With such an honest revelation of emotions in his lyrics, it's hard to imagine the tune does not stir hearts."

According to Katherine St Asaph of PopDust, the song was probably the closest to his and Colbie Caillat's collaboration "Lucky." She added that it was "a gentle acoustic ballad with a hint of speak-singing a ways in but otherwise straightforward and straight-faced [that] soft-rocks its way through sentiments like "when I look into your eyes, it's like watching the night sky or a beautiful sunrise–there's just so much they hold"–still earnest, but joke-free." Amy Dawson of Metro UK called it "a delicate, countrified guitar ballad that drives into a power-chorus singalong conclusion." Colin McGuire of PopMatters was mixed in his review, writing that "'I Won't Give Up', for instance, is acoustic guitar-laden folky pop that falls at least a little bit flat with its predictably bland approach. While the song's hook proves itself memorable enough, the track never graduates into anything other than the ballad-like tediousness the singer has a tendency to revert into."

== Chart performance ==
While the song debuted at number 8 on the Billboard Hot 100 chart, it immediately hit the top spot on the Hot Digital Songs chart selling 229,000 downloads for its first week. On the Hot 100, the track's launch is the highest for a male pop/rock singer-songwriter since David Cook burst in at number 3 with "The Time of My Life" the week of June 7, 2008, after he was crowned "American Idol" champion. On Adult Pop Songs it began at number 36. On the week of October 18, 2012, the song became the "Greatest Gainer" on the Hot Adult Contemporary chart, reaching number 7. After the success, his manager Bill Silva commented: "What surprised us is how the fans reacted. We didn't pre-promote the single, we didn't go to radio with it, and this song did 229,000 units its first week in the U.S. There was clearly something resonant about the song, and it immediately shifted the strategy for what the rollout of the album was going to be." The song reached 4 million in digital sales by April 23, 2014, in the US. As of April 2016, the song has sold 4,469,000 copies in the US.

Internationally, the song also achieved success. In Austria, the song debuted at number 23 on the Ö3 Austria Top 40 chart, on March 23, 2012. Later, the song jumped to number 22, before falling for two consecutive weeks, until it reached again number 22, on April 20, 2012. Later, the song reached number 20, before climbing to number 17. On May 11, 2012, the song fell to number 21, but the next week the song peaked at number 12. It spent 22 weeks on the chart. In the Netherlands, the song was a big hit, debuting at number 52 on the Dutch Top 40 chart, on January 7, 2012. After climbing the charts for six consecutive weeks and reaching number 11, the song fell for two consecutive weeks, until it climbed to number 10. The song kept on climbing for 2 weeks, until it peaked at number 3, on April 21, 2012. It spent a total of 32 consecutive weeks on the chart. In the UK, the song debuted at number 16 on the UK Singles Chart week of March 24, 2012, and peaked at number 11. It remained for 30 weeks on the chart and became the 46th biggest selling single of 2012.

== Live performances ==
Mraz first performed the song live during his 2011 concert tour, well before an official version was released. He performed it live on Today on February 16, 2012, later on the Late Show with David Letterman and on The Ellen DeGeneres Show. Mraz performed "I Won't Give Up" with Daryl Hall in episode 55 of Live from Daryl's House.

== Music video ==
On January 2, 2012, a lyric video was released. Mark Blankenship from NPR found "I Won't Give Up" the best lyric video because "the lyrics are integrated into a story about a man who writes his girlfriend until they can finally reunite." He added he preferred this video to the official one. The official music video was directed by Mark Pellington and released on February 17, 2012. Mraz explained "The story of the video is that we all have our stories. We all have our own version of suffering….and everybody has many things to not give up on."

Jason Lipshutz from Billboard found some similarities to Terrence Malick's film The Tree of Life, "with its lingering shots of wholesome Americana, sun-stroked imagery, non-linear structure and contrast between out-of-focus landscape shots and striking close-ups." The video was also compared to Bruce Springsteen's "We Take Care of Our Own" music video, "with its gritty portraits of beleaguered U.S. citizens of every race and creed." Andrew Unterberger from PopDust described the video as "a stately, if somewhat boring, assemblage of nature shots mixed with pictures of people young and old looking semi-contemplative."

== Track listing ==
- Digital download
1. "I Won't Give Up" – 4:05

== Credits and personnel ==
- Jason Mraz – lead vocals and backing vocals, acoustic guitar
- Paul Bushnell – bass
- Tim Pierce – electric guitar
- Jeff Babko – electric piano
- Matt Chamberlain – drums
- David Davidson – string arrangement
- Toca Rivera, Arnold McCuller, Amy Keys, Valerie Pinkston – backing vocals

== Charts and certifications ==
=== Weekly charts ===
Weekly chart performance for "I Won't Give Up"
Chart (2012–2013)	Peak position
Australia (ARIA)	22
Austria (Ö3 Austria Top 40)	12
Belgium (Ultratip Bubbling Under Flanders)	14
Belgium (Ultratip Bubbling Under Wallonia)	28
Canada Hot 100 (Billboard)	11
Germany (GfK)	73
Ireland (IRMA)	9
Italian Airplay (EarOne)	100
Netherlands (Dutch Top 40)	3
Netherlands (Single Top 100)	3
New Zealand (Recorded Music NZ)	37
Norway (VG-lista)	15
Scottish Singles Sales (Official Charts)	14
South Korea International Singles (Gaon)	1
Spain (Promusicae)	23
Switzerland (Schweizer Hitparade)	28
UK Singles (Official Charts)	11
US Billboard Hot 100	8
US Adult Alternative Airplay (Billboard)	18
US Adult Contemporary (Billboard)	3
US Adult Pop Airplay (Billboard)	8
US Pop Airplay (Billboard)	20
US Radio Songs (Billboard)	33

=== Year-end charts ===
Annual chart rankings for "I Won't Give Up"
Chart (2012)	Position
Austria (Ö3 Austria Top 40)	64
Brazil (Crowley)	100
Canada (Canadian Hot 100)	56
Netherlands (Dutch Top 40)	10
Netherlands (Single Top 100)	17
UK Singles (OCC)	46
US Billboard Hot 100	25
US Adult Contemporary (Billboard)	16
US Adult Top 40 (Billboard)	11

Chart (2013)	Position
UK Singles (OCC)	152
US Adult Contemporary (Billboard)	16

=== All-time charts ===
All-time chart rankings for "I Won't Give Up"
Chart	Rank
Dutch Love Songs (Dutch Top 40)	20

== Certifications ==
Region	Certification	Certified units/sales
Australia (ARIA)	Platinum	70,000^{^}
Austria (IFPI Austria)	Gold	15,000^{*}
Canada (Music Canada)	3× Platinum	240,000^{*}
Denmark (IFPI Danmark)	Platinum	90,000^{‡}
Italy (FIMI)	Gold	25,000^{‡}
Mexico (AMPROFON)	Gold	30,000^{*}
New Zealand (RMNZ)	3× Platinum	90,000^{‡}
Spain (Promusicae)	Gold	30,000^{‡}
Switzerland (IFPI Switzerland)	Gold	15,000^{^}
United Kingdom (BPI)	2× Platinum	1,200,000^{‡}
United States (RIAA)	6× Platinum	6,000,000^{‡}
Streaming
Denmark (IFPI Danmark)	Gold	900,000^{†}
^{*} Sales figures based on certification alone.^{^} Shipments figures based on certification alone.^{‡} Sales+streaming figures based on certification alone.^{†} Streaming-only figures based on certification alone.

== Titanium version ==
"I Won't Give Up"

Single by Titanium

from the album All for You
- Released: 19 October 2012
- Recorded: 2012 (Auckland)
- Genre: Pop
- Length: 3:41
- Label: Illegal Musik, Warner Music, Atlantic Records
- Songwriters: Jason Mraz, Michael Natter
- Producer: Joe Chiccarelli

Titanium singles chronology
"Come On Home" (2012)	"I Won't Give Up" (2012)	"Sky" (2012)

Music video
- "I Won't Give Up" on YouTube

The song was recorded by and released as a single by New Zealand boy band Titanium which features on their debut studio album All For You (2012). It was released as the album's second single.

=== Chart performance ===
"I Won't Give Up" debuted and peaked at number sixteen on the New Zealand Singles Chart in 2012. In Australia after a short two week tour in early 2013 and heavy promotion the song reached number 69 on the Australian Singles Chart.

=== Music video ===
The original music video debuted on YouTube and topped 800,000 views but was replaced with a new video that has since reached over 200,000 hits. The video shows all six boys singing in the recording studio.

== Christina Grimmie version ==
"I Won't Give Up"

Single by Christina Grimmie

from the album Side B
- Released: 21 April 2017
- Recorded: 2016
- Genre: Pop
- Length: 3:29
- Label: Republic Records; UMG; ZXL Music, Inc.
- Songwriters: Jason Mraz; Michael Natter
- Producer: Stephen Rezza

The song was covered by Christina Grimmie in 2012 on her YouTube channel. She then performed the song on The Voice.

Afterwards, the song was again covered by Grimmie in 2016 and released as the final track of her posthumous EP, Side B, released on April 21, 2017.

== Other cover versions ==
Australian singer Cody Simpson performed it during a concert in the Bahamas. American Idol contestant from the season 12 Johnny Keyser also sang it. The song was also covered by Lea Michele as Rachel Berry in the season 3 episode of Glee, entitled "Props". "I Won't Give Up" is also covered by a cappella group Straight No Chaser in which Jason Mraz is featured on the recording Under the Influence. The Royce Twins from Season 5 of The X Factor Australia also sung and released it. In 2016, the song was covered by country singer Trisha Yearwood for the US version of the musical The Passion. Korean Idol Rosé from the girl group "Blackpink", also covered this song for her audition to "YG entertainment".
