= Choose Love (film) =

American interactive romcom film

- Directed by: Stuart McDonald
- Screenplay by: Josann McGibbon
- Produced by: Robyn Snyder; Deborah Evans; Mel Turner; Axel Paton
- Starring: Laura Marano; Avan Jogia; Jordi Webber; Scott Michael Foster
- Cinematography: Toby Oliver
- Edited by: Anita Brandt-Burgoyne; Lauren A. Schaffer
- Music by: Gabriel Mann
- Production companies: DAE Light Media; Front Row Films; Netflix Studios
- Distributed by: Netflix
- Release date: August 31, 2023
- Running time: 77 minutes
- Country: United States
- Language: English

Choose Love is a 2023 interactive romantic comedy film on streaming service Netflix. Viewers make choices for the main character Cami, portrayed by Laura Marano, as she questions her relationship with her partner Paul when two other men enter her life. It was released on August 31, 2023, but was removed from Netflix's catalogue on December 1, 2024. It received a generally negative reception.

== Description ==
Cami's happy relationship with her boyfriend Paul is disrupted when two other men enter her life: her first partner Jack and British rockstar Rex. Viewers are given choices for Cami to make, which affect the future of the story. For example, on the first such occasion, Cami is getting a tarot card reading, and the audience is to choose whether she wants to hear the 'good news' or 'bad news' first. The choices are sometimes initiated by Cami's breaking the fourth wall to directly address the audience. The film is designed such that, after making a choice and seeing the result, the audience may go back and make a different choice, yielding a different result.

The film has six possible endings that branch from viewer decisions:

- Cami decides not to pursue either Jack or Rex and returns to Paul; the two get engaged.
- Cami ends up with Jack.
- Cami breaks up with Jack; Paul appears and proposes to Cami. She then refuses his proposal, remaining single.
- Cami breaks up with Jack, then accepts Paul's proposal, and the two get married in Las Vegas.
- Cami ends up with Rex in Paris.
- Cami breaks up with Rex, remaining single.

== Cast ==
- Laura Marano as Cami Conway
- Scott Michael Foster as Paul Swartz
- Jordi Webber as Jack Menna
- Avan Jogia as Rex Galier
- Megan Smart as Amalia, Cami's sister
- Blair Strang as Dan, Cami's boss
- Benjamin Hoetjes
- Nell Fisher as Luisa

== Production ==
In March 2022, it was announced that Robyn Snyder, Deborah Evans, Mel Turner, and Axel Paton would produce the picture. It is written by Josann McGibbon, with Stuart McDonald directing.

=== Casting ===
In March 2022, the cast was announced.

=== Filming ===
Filming primarily took place in May 2022 in and around Auckland, New Zealand.

== Release ==
The film was released on Netflix on August 31, 2023.

In November 2024, Netflix announced that they would remove most of the interactive media, including Choose Love, from their catalogue on December 1, 2024.

== Reception ==
Choose Love received generally negative reviews from critics. Claire Shaffer wrote for The New York Times that, unlike other interactive films whose "unpredictability [...] kept the gimmick somewhat afloat", the film was "a series of disconnected, shallow interactions, each leading to a different predetermined cliché." Liz Kocan wrote for Decider that the otherwise-likeable character design suffered from the interactivity. Brian Lowry wrote for CNN that the film "strains the storytelling to fit the gimmick" and demonstrates that interactive films, "while theoretically intriguing, seldom match the appeal of a well-told story." Courtney Howard wrote for Variety that the setting was "difficult to be fully immersed in" and that the "[m]en are one-dimensional at best, used solely to further [Cami's] arc." Linda Holmes wrote for NPR, "You pick the ending you want, and it gives it to you." as a critique of the film, which she compared to AI-generated content. Adrian Horton, writing for The Guardian, criticized the "flatly lit and oversaturated style" and "overdrawn acting and stakes-less swooning", also calling the film "another poor conclusion of algorithmic content" and saying that it has contributed to the "oppression of choice" present in such media, but praised it "for entertaining the prospect of a female protagonist ultimately choosing to go solo". Lydia Venn writing for Cosmopolitan and Pratik Handore writing for The Cinemaholic both also praised the endings where Cami chooses to be single, calling them "empowering".

Several critics compared Choose Love's interactivity to that of the films Black Mirror: Bandersnatch (2018) – also from Netflix – and Unbreakable Kimmy Schmidt: Kimmy vs the Reverend (2020).

On the review aggregator website Rotten Tomatoes, the film holds a score of 30% from 20 critics. On Metacritic, it has a "generally unfavorable" score of 35% from 8 critics.

=== Accolades ===
Organization	Year	Category	Result	Ref.
26th Family Film and TV Awards	2024	Best Family Film (Television)	Nominated	
