= Moon Rock for Monday =

2020 Australian independent film

Moon Rock For Monday
- Directed by: Kurt Martin
- Written by: Kurt Martin
- Produced by: Jim Robison
- Starring: Ashlyn Louden-Gamble; George Pullar; Nicholas Hope; Aaron Jeffery; Jessica Napier
- Distributed by: Pinnacle Films (Australia) Cinedigm (North America)
- Release dates: October 2020 (Adelaide Film Festival); 22 April 2021
- Running time: 1h 40m
- Country: Australia

Moon Rock For Monday is a 2020 Australian independent film written and directed by Kurt Martin.

== Plot ==
Moon Rock For Monday is a coming-of-age road movie. A terminally ill nine-year-old girl, Monday, who has little contact with the outside world, being home-schooled, becomes captivated by Uluru, which she dubs the "Moon Rock", believing that it will cure her.

Monday gets involved in a police chase involving teenage street kid Tyler, who starts off using her to evade the police, but they become friends and decide to go on the run, and set off on a road trip to the Northern Territory to find the Moon Rock.

== Cast ==
- George Pullar as Tyler
- Ashlyn Louden-Gamble as Monday
- Nicholas Hope as The Bobbins
- Alan Dukes
- Aaron Jeffery as Bob
- Jessica Napier as Nurse Roz
- David Field as Detective Lionell
- Maha Wilson
- Rahel Romahn as Moose
- Clarence Ryan as Johnny
- Bonnie Ferguson
- Karina Banno
- Kai Lewins
- Dean Kyrwood

== Production ==
Moon Rock For Monday was made in 2020, written and directed by Kurt Martin and produced by Jim Robison of Lunar Pictures.

== Release ==
Moon Rock for Monday was screened in several international film festivals, including 2020 CinefestOZ, Adelaide Film Festival, Byron Bay Film Festival, Schlingel International Film Festival, Ale Kino Family Film Festival in Poland, Beijing International Film Festival, Zurich Film Festival, the Busan International Kids and Youth Film Festival, and others.

It was released in Australian cinemas on 22 April 2021 by Pinnacle Films. It was sold to US distributor Cinedigm, and to German-speaking Europe via Landfilm; South Korea and Japan with Youngjin Creative; Latin America with Encripta, and to Poland via Media4Fun.

It was released onto Foxtel Movies and Binge in Australia in March 2022.

== Nominations and awards ==
Moon Rock for Monday won eight awards and received 25 nominations in several countries.

The film won the FIPRESCI Award at the Schlingel Film Fest in Germany.

It won Gold Award at the ACS (Australian Society of Cinematographers) Awards, as well as Best Feature Film, Best Screenplay, and Best Lead Actor at the 2021 Australian Screen Industry Network Awards.

It was nominated for an AACTA Award in 2021 for Best Indie Film by the Australian Academy of Cinema and Television Arts.
