= Megan Smart =

Australian actress

- Born: 14 December 1994 (age 31); Brisbane
- Other name: Megan Hajjar
- Education: Western Australian Academy of Performing Arts
- Occupation: Actress
- Television: Home and Away; Class of '07

Megan Smart (legally Megan Hajjar since 2019, born 14 December 1994) is an Australian television and film actress.

== Early life ==
Smart was born in Brisbane to an Australian father and a Lebanese mother. She graduated from Western Australian Academy of Performing Arts in 2016. She has Lebanese heritage on her mother’s side and legally changed her surname to Hajjar, her mother’s maiden name, in 2019 to be considered for more Middle Eastern roles.

== Career ==
She made her screen debut in the 2017 film Breath, winning the role after her first professional audition. She also appeared in Love Child. She played a serial killer named Charlotte in the ABC television series Harrow. She played troublemaker Anna Hennessy in Screentime and Channel Seven’s The Secret Daughter in which she appeared with Jessica Mauboy. She also had a role in Peter Rabbit 2: The Runaway.

In the 2019 film The Naked Wanderer, she played the former girlfriend of the lead character.

In 2020, she played Jaiwara, a Lebanese Muslim woman who has a romance with a musician, in the film Measure for Measure, which also starred Hugo Weaving, and was a retelling of Shakespeare’s 1609 play of the same name.

Between 2020 and 2021, while starring on the Seven Network drama Between Two Worlds and performing voice acting for Peter Rabbit 2: The Runaway, Smart was credited under her new name Megan Hajjar. In further roles she went on to be credited as Megan Smart again.

In 2021, she could be seen as Paloma in miniseries The Unusual Suspects. That year she also appeared in Wakefield for ABC. Smart also appeared in soap opera Home and Away and in the Netflix interactive rom-com Choose Love. In 2022, Smart made her debut as a director with the short film Stonefish. It was nominated for Best Short Film at the 12th AACTA Awards in December 2022.

Smart had the role of Amelia Collins on the 2023 Australian comedy series Class of '07 for Prime Video.

In 2025, Smart could be seen in season two of Australian crime thriller television series Black Snow. The following year, Smart appeared in Dear Life as Taylor Parkinson. and alongside Asa Butterfield I’m comedy Gnomes.

== Filmography ==
=== Television appearances ===
Year	Title	Role	Notes	Ref
2017	Love Child	Barbara Fitzgerald	1 episode	
2017	The Secret Daughter	Anna Hennessy	4 episodes	
2018	Harrow	Charlotte	1 episode	
2020	Between Two Worlds	Bella Gray	As Megan Hajjar	
2021	Wakefield	Ivy	2 episodes	
2021	The Unusual Suspects	Paloma	2 episodes	
2021	Home and Away	Anne Sherman	7 episodes	
2023	Class of '07	Amelia	Lead role. 8 episodes	
2025	Black Snow	Samara Kahlil	6 episodes	
2026	Dear Life	Taylor Parkinson	4 episodes	
2026	Gnomes	Ellie McKay	6 episodes	

=== Film appearances ===
Year	Title	Role	Notes
2024	A Rose for Katrina	Katrina	Short
2023	Choose Love	Amalia	
2020	Measure for Measure	Jaiwara	
2020	Peter Rabbit 2: The Runaway	Executive	As Megan Hajjar
2019	The Naked Wanderer	Jasmine	
2017	Breath	Karen	

=== Staff credits ===
Year	Title	Role	Ref
2022	Stonefish	Director / Producer	
2013	Showreel	Writer	
