= Ngā Manu Kōrero =

Māori language speech competition

Ngā Manu Kōrero is a speech competition for secondary students that encourages fluency in te reo Māori and English.

== History ==
The contest began in 1965 as the Korimako Speech Contest. Sir Bernard Fergusson donated a trophy to encourage greater English fluency in Māori students. School and regional competitions were organised by the Post Primary Teachers' Association and Māori Education Foundation (now Māori Education Trust) with a national final in August 1965.

In 1977, the Pei Te Hurinui Jones Contest was added for senior Māori oratory. Three years later, a junior English section was introduced, with a taonga for the section provided by Ngāti Kahungunu ki Te Tairoa in memory of Sir Turi Carroll, and three years after that, the junior Māori oratory section, Rāwhiti Īhaka, was added.

In 1987, after considerable growth in the competition, it was renamed 'Ngā Whakataetae mō Ngā Manu Kōrero o Ngā Kura Tuarua', generally shortened to Ngā Manu Kōrero.

In 2020, the competition was cancelled due to the Covid-19 pandemic. In 2021, it was moved online.

== Divisions ==
The competition has four divisions:

=== Pei Te Hurinui Jones Contest ===
Named in honour of Dr Pei Te Hurinui Jones, a Waikato elder and scholar who died in 1976, this section is for Senior students and consists of two speeches in te reo Māori, one prepared and the other impromptu.

=== Te Rāwhiti Ihaka Contest ===
Named in honour of Rāwhiti Ihaka, a skilled orator and teacher at St Stephens School, this section is for Junior students and consists of one prepared speech in te reo Māori.

=== Korimako Contest ===
The Korimako Contest is for Senior* students and consists of two speeches in English, one prepared and the other impromptu.

=== Sir Turi Carroll Contest ===
Named in honour of Sir Turi Carroll, Ngāti Kahungunu leader and orator, this section is for Junior* students and consists of a prepared speech in English.

== Former Winners ==
Year of Win	Pei Te Hurunui	Korimako	Rāwhiti Ihaka	Sir Turi Caroll
1965	NO COMPETITION	Donna Awatere	NO COMPETITION	NO COMPETITION
1966	NO COMPETITION	Pamela Bennett	NO COMPETITION	NO COMPETITION
1967	NO COMPETITION	Rawinia Paku	NO COMPETITION	NO COMPETITION
1968	NO COMPETITION	Raelene Beauchamp	NO COMPETITION	NO COMPETITION
1969	NO COMPETITION	Peata Munroe	NO COMPETITION	NO COMPETITION
1970	NO COMPETITION	Philip Munroe	NO COMPETITION	NO COMPETITION
1971	NO COMPETITION	Margaret Mary Gordon	NO COMPETITION	NO COMPETITION
1972	NO COMPETITION	NO COMPETITION	NO COMPETITION	NO COMPETITION
1973	NO COMPETITION	Prudence Kapua	NO COMPETITION	NO COMPETITION
1974	NO COMPETITION	Robert Kerehome	NO COMPETITION	NO COMPETITION
1975	NO COMPETITION	Len Maxwell	NO COMPETITION	NO COMPETITION
1976	NO COMPETITION	Kevin Wehipeihana	NO COMPETITION	NO COMPETITION
1977	Vicki Wehi	Lillian Hetet	NO COMPETITION	NO COMPETITION
1978	Raniera Te Moni	John Waititi	NO COMPETITION	NO COMPETITION
1979	Mauriora Kingi	Aroaro Hona	NO COMPETITION	NO COMPETITION
1980	Derek Lardelli	Karen Hoko Te Moana	NO COMPETITION	Darrin Apanui
1981	William Te Aho	Dale Timma	NO COMPETITION	Rata Kamau
1982	William Te Aho	Kara Shortland	NO COMPETITION	Keri Milne
1983	Te Awanui Timutimu	Margaret Edwards	Martin Simeon	Keri Milne
1984	Wai Eruera	Keri Milne	Wayne Wills	Erina Hurihanganui
1985	Hans Tiakiwai	Marama Ormsby	Kupe Kaka	Dallas Cribb
1986	Nicholas Ngaropo	Rebecca Davis	Lisa Lumsden	Derryn Milne
1987	Ruia Abraham	Katie Paul	Tamehana Ngaropo	Kane Milne
1988	Christine Ward	Shane Heremaia	Te Aroha Paenga	Kane Milne
1989	Paul Brooking	Eugene Hapi	Ian Nepia	Tony Murray
1990	Coby Karauria	Jeremy Lambert	Len Lopata	Asia Tawhai
1991	Hinematioro Nohotima	Tajim Mohammed	Ngatapa Black	Jason Ruhe
1992	Tony Murray	Wiremu Diamond	Desmond Tawhi	Jason Ruhe
1993	Pateriki McGarvey	Julian Wilcox	Tamati Waaka	Reuben Whakamoe
1994	Pateriki McGarvey	Wesley Hema	Paraone Gloyne	Stephen Comrie
1995	Tamati Waaka	Parehuia Heke	Marseilles Copper	Graeme Rakuraku
1996	Tamati Waaka	Cushla Pou-Haereiti	Pumi Tumai	Chantelle Herbert
1997	Tamati Waaka	Regan Pepere	Tawhirimatea Williams	Patricia Tauraeiki
1998	Kingi Kiriona	Kingi Kiriona	Tawhirimatea Williams	Hinenui Tipoki-Lawton
1999	Pumi Tumai	Kingi Kiriona	James Teepa	Sarah Thornley
2000	Hinurewa Poutu	Hinurewa Poutu	Te Ingo Ngaia	Chardel Kiriona
2001	Tawhirimatea Williams	Jasmine Turei & Turanga Merito	Ropiha Anderson	Brendan Solomon
2002	Tawhirimatea Williams	Tell Kuka	Richard Hohua	Tai Kahe-Katterns
2003	Whitiaua Black	Makareta McGavock	Nawaia Watene	Eruera Manuel
2004	Whitiaua Black	Weronika Grace	Rapaera Tawhai	Levi Te Ahorangi Ferris
2005	Mangere Teka	Ngira Simmonds	Kawiti Waetford	Tania Matua
2006	Hona Black	Aidan Allen	Kimiora-Kaire Melbourne	Matariki Cribb
2007	Tupoutahi Winiata-Kaipara	Ibrahim Soloman	Te Ataakura Pewhairangi	Cruz Karauti Fox
2008	Tokoaitua Winiata	Rihari Ratahi	Rākai-Hākeke Whauwhau	Mitchell Spence
2009	Te Wairere Ngaia	Kani Rickard	Keria Paki	Taylor Taranaki
2010	Herea Winitana	Soraya Kamau	Kaharau Keogh	Evana Schnikel
2011	Hoera Kereama	Pereteruruoteramana Wihongi	Ahurei Kaaho Winiata	Zion Otimi-Whanga-Papa
2012	Kaharau Keogh	Rangimārie Teautama	Te Aranga Hakiwai	Shayla Fiaui
2013	Raniera Blake	Sonny Ngatai	Matawhaiti Nepe-Pohatu	Karen Cribb
2014	Te Rangimoana Rangihau	Sonny Ngatai	Michael Rangihau	Nikau Te Huki
2015	Akuira Tiakiwai	Te Ariki Te Puni	Kaanihi Butler-Hare	Moana Cook
2016	Paumea Walker	Hinepounamu Apanui-Barr	Tangirau Papa	Hetera'a Mahana Tahau-Hodges
2017	Whakaue Winiata	Piripi Gordon	Ngawairere Pihama	Shay Witehira
2018	Maia Takitimu	Tuimaleali'ifano Fiso	Te Ākauroa Jacob	Sophia 'Unga-Cribb
2019	Hinewai Netana-Williams	Manaia Sorenson	Tanekaha Mariu-Rangi	Paretoroa Webster-Tarei
2020	NO COMPETITION	NO COMPETITION	NO COMPETITION	NO COMPETITION
2021	Te Ākauroa Jacob	Khalia Wilson	H'zel Hetaraka	Aria Komene
2022	Heremia McGarvey	Reihana Heemi Teriaki	Epiha Muru-Kete	Tuck Kahukuranui
2023	Elite Reti	Maro Preston	Charlie Casha	Tuhingaia Manihera
2024	Te Kanawa Wilson	Tuhingaia Manihera	Kahurere Whauwhau	Pou Ariki Hemara-Daniels
2025	Te Kahurangi Teinakore-Huaki	Scott Picard	Atareta Milne	Pou Ariki Hemara-Daniels
2026	Rereaio Kahi	Kuramātakitaki Stevens	Tangiata Teinakore-Huaki	Arihia Phillips
