= Take Us Back (Titanium song) =

Single by Titanium
- Released: 5 September 2014
- Recorded: 2014 (Auckland)
- Genre: Pop, dance
- Length: 3:34
- Label: Titanium Music / LTPS / Warner Music
- Songwriter(s): Vince Harder, Zac Taylor, Andrew Papas, Shaquille Paranihi-Ngauma, Haydn Linsley

Titanium singles chronology
"Unarmed" (2013)	"Take Us Back" (2014)	"Heartache" (2014)

Music video
- "Take Us Back" on YouTube

"Take Us Back" is the 2014 single by the New Zealand boy band Titanium. It was released on Titanium Music own label under exclusive license to LTPS Music Limited (Warner).

== Charts and certifications ==
Chart (2014)	Peak Position
New Zealand Singles (RIANZ)	9

== Release history ==
Region	Date	Format	Label
New Zealand	9 September 2014	Digital Download	LTPS Music Limited (Warner)
