= Vino Vikraman Pillai =

Indian film director

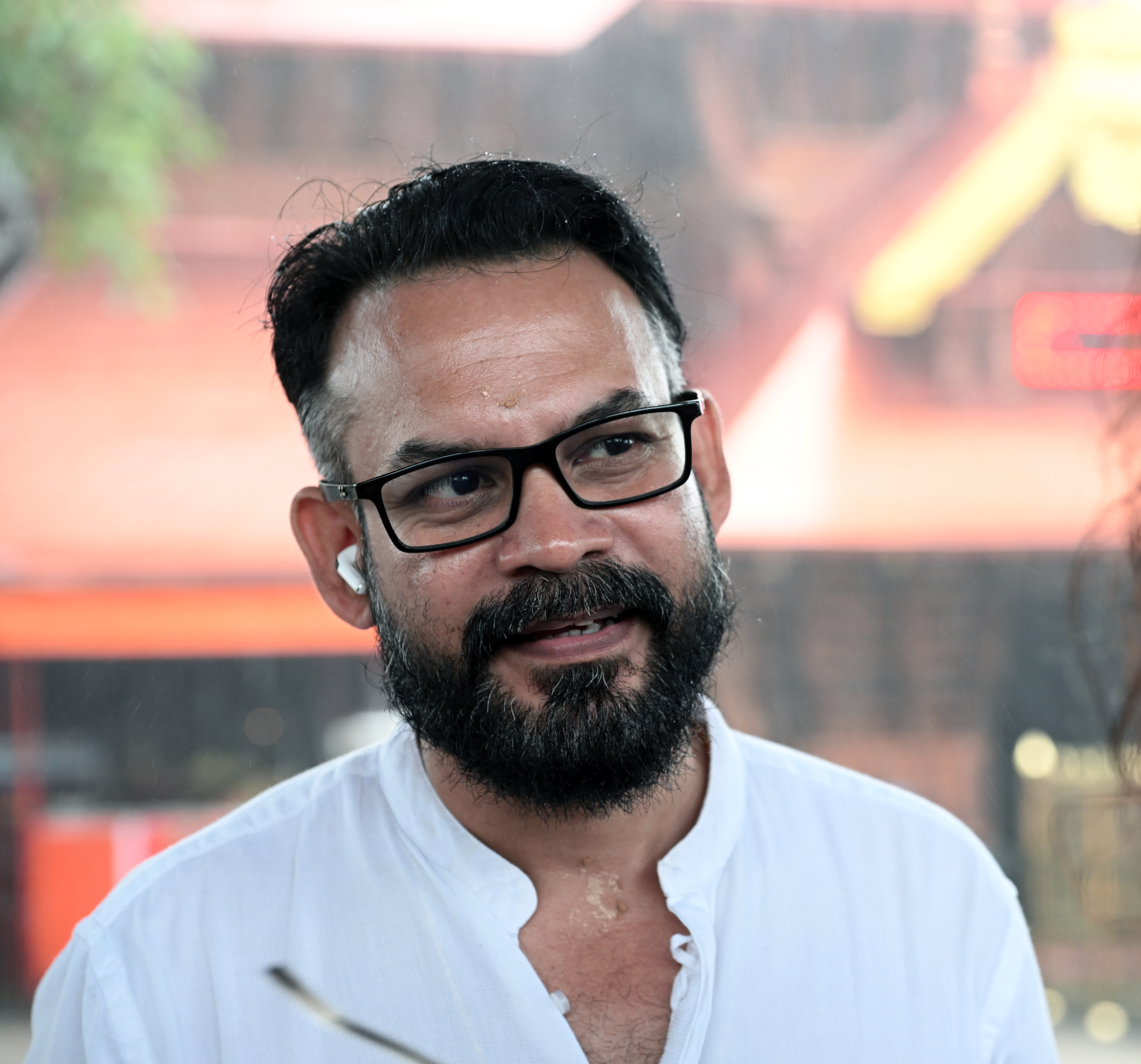
- Occupations: Director; screenwriter
- Years active: 2007–present

Vino Vikraman Pillai (also known as Vinod Karicode) is an Indian filmmaker primarily working in Malayalam and Tamil cinema. His directorial debut was Kafir (2022),

== Filmmaking career ==
In 2022, Pillai made his directorial debut with the film Kafir. The film explores the mental struggles of Reghuram a pogonophobic health inspector who believes that all the people who have beard are terrorists and they can be identified from their clothings. Kafir was selected for screening at several international film festivals, including International Film Festival of Kerala (IFFK), Diorama International Film Festival, Thrissur International Film Festival. The film received recognition at the Mumbai International Film Award in 2023, where Pillai was awarded the Special Jury Award.

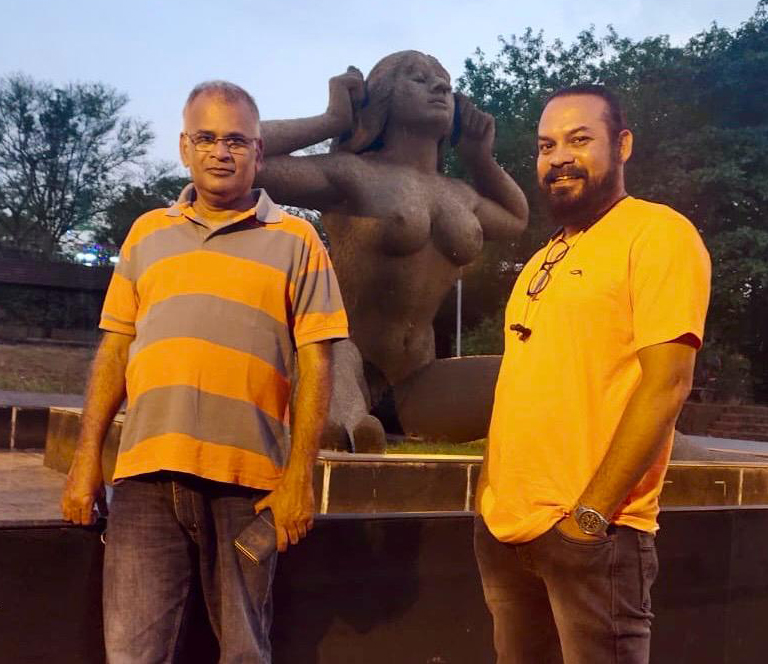
Vino with famous writer B. Jeyamohan

== Filmography ==
Kafir (2022) - Director, Writer

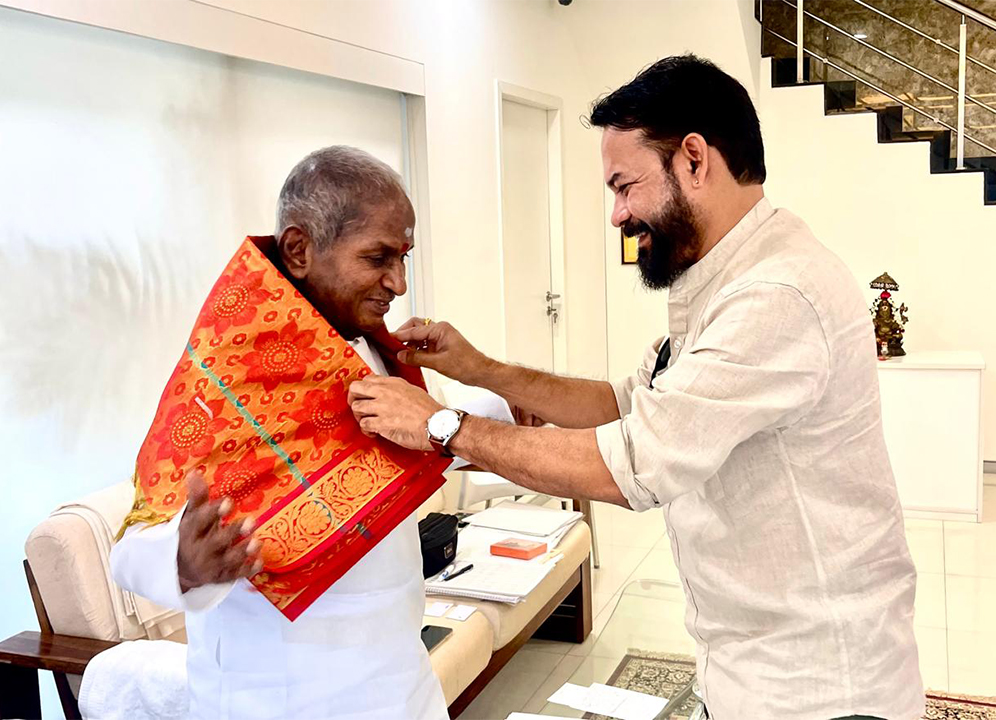
Vino with famous Music Director Ilaiyaraaja
