= The Royce Twins =

Australian musical duo

- From left to right: Gabriel Saalfield, Michael Saalfield

Background information
- Born: 14 December 1990 (age 35)
- Origin: Mount Beauty, Victoria, Australia
- Genres: Singer-songwriter; Indie Pop; Soft Rock; Adult Contemporary; Country; Folk
- Occupations: Singer songwriters, musicians
- Instruments: Vocals, Guitar, Drums, Saxophone, Keyboard
- Years active: 2012–present
- Label: Independent
- Members: Gabriel Saalfield; Michael Saalfield
- Website: www.theroycetwins.com.au

The Royce Twins (born 14 December 1990) are Australian-based singer-songwriters from Mount Beauty, Victoria, Australia and currently living in Melbourne. The duo consists of twin brothers Gabriel Saalfield and Michael Saalfield.

== Early life ==
Gabriel and Michael Saalfield (twin brothers) were born on 14 December 1990. The twins were raised in the Australian fostercare system, after their mother died of breast cancer at the age of 8 and their father in a house fire when they were 11. They grew up in Mount Beauty, Victoria, and appeared on Australian News and Talk show The Project in 2010, talking about their experience. Michael has said "I reckon I'll be a foster carer when I'm older".

== Career ==
=== 2010–2014 ===
The Royce Twins played regularly at The George Hotel in Ballarat and JD's Sports Bar in Ballarat, while completing their studies in a Bachelor of Exercise and Sports Science at Federation University. The brothers graduated in 2014.

The Royce Twins made an appearance on series 5 of The X Factor Australia in September 2013 performing "I Won't Give Up" by American Singer Songwriter Jason Mraz. At the time of writing, that performance has over 9 million views on YouTube.

After successfully crowd funding their debut EP, The Royce Twins released their self-titled debut EP in 2014. The Royce Twins used the Pozible crowd funding platform.

The Royce Twins performed at a number of events including Springfest, The Royce Twins opened for Australian music icon Daryl Braithwaite in January 2014 at the Perricoota Music Festival, they performed at The Young Leaders Day in March 2014 in Melbourne, Australia, and The Royce Twins performed at the Mount Beauty Music Festival.

=== The Royce Twins Debut EP ===
The Royce Twins prepared for the launch of their Debut EP after completing a photo shoot in The Blue Mountains.

The Royce Twins officially launch their self-titled Debut EP (The Royce Twins – Debut EP) at JD's Sports Bar Ballarat on 26 July 2014 The Royce Twins Debut EP features five tracks, four of them original compositions by The Royce Twins

The Royce Twins release their first original song called "Heartstrings" to Australian Radio on 22 September 2014

=== 2015 ===
The Royce Twins release a surprise video and single for Valentine's Day 2015 "Heartstrings Unplugged"

The Royce Twins support the Fiona Elsey Cancer Research Institute through the Ballarat Cycle Classic 2015

The Royce Twins release a tribute single "We will be the rain" on 10 April 2015 to remember those who have and continue to serve in our defence forces.

The Royce Twins release their second original song called "Brave" to Australian Radio on 22 June 2015

The Royce Twins release their third original song called "Fly" to Australian Radio on 12 November 2015

=== 2016–17 ===
The Royce Twins continue to perform live and in 2017 began recording their next release.

=== 2017 ===
The Royce Twins release a new EP called "4 Years" on 20 October 2017. "4 Years" features five new original tracks written and performed by Gabriel and Michael, including 'Picture Perfect', 'Shade Of The Moon', 'Falling', '4 Years Ago' and 'Nightmare'

=== 2020 ===
The Royce Twins release a single called "Black Lace" on the 3 April 2020.

=== 2026 ===
Gabriel, releases his first solo Debut Single called "WANTED" on 30 October 2026. It's a step away from his acoustic folk roots into country-rock.

== Recordings and discography ==
Gabriel Saalfield released the first Royce Twins original during their crowd funding campaign on their website for those people who had lost someone at Christmas. The name of the song is "Suzie Royce" and it's set to appear on their Debut EP.

In June 2014, The Royce Twins are preparing to release their Debut EP. The release includes five tracks. Four of the tracks are original song recordings, 'Heartstings', 'Brave', 'Fly' and 'Suzie Royce'. The fifth track is "I won't give up" by Jason Mraz and Michael Natter.

On 22 September 2014, The Royce Twins released their first original song to Australian radio called "Heartstrings".

On 13 February 2015, The Royce Twins' release a surprise single and video on Valentine's Day called "Heartstrings Unplugged".

On 10 April 2015, The Royce Twins' release "We Will Be the Rain", a single to remember those who have and continue to serve in our defence forces.

On 12 May 2017, The Royce Twins "We Will Be the Rain", forms a part of the Big Fuss Records Compilation, Songs of Service II.

On 21 October 2017, The Royce Twins released a new EP called "4 Years" that contains five new tracks written and performed by them.

On 3 April 2020, The Royce Twins released a new single called "Black Lace". The song is described as an 'upbeat sexy rock track'.

On 31 October 2026, Gabriel released a debut solo single called "WANTED". The song is described as a 'passionate highway anthem'.

== Chart positions and notables ==
"WANTED" enters the charts at No.15 on the 100% independent singles chart published by AIR.

"I Won't Give Up" their XFactor audition performance charted on the Aria Charts entering the top 100 at number 35.

The Royce Twins debut EP, charts at No.20 on the 100% independent singles chart published by AIR.

In August 2014, The Royce Twins received over 4.4 million views of their X Factor audition. That's twice as many as the winner of the series they appeared with (Dami Im).

== Awards and nominations ==
Year	Type	Recipient	Award	Result
March 2015	International Songwriting Competition (2014)	"Fly" written by Gabriel and Michael Saalfield	Pop/Top 40 Category	Semi-finalist

Year	Type	Recipient	Award	Result
March 2016	International Songwriting Competition (2015)	"Heartstrings" written by Gabriel and Michael Saalfield	Singer-Songwriter/Folk Category	Semi-finalist

Year	Type	Recipient	Award	Result
February 2018	International Songwriting Competition (2017)	"Picture Perfect" written by Gabriel and Michael Saalfield	Adult Contemporary Category	Semi-finalist

Year	Type	Recipient	Award	Result
February 2019	International Songwriting Competition (2018)	"4 Years Ago" written by Gabriel and Michael Saalfield	Unpublished Category	Semi-finalist

Year	Type	Recipient	Award	Result
February 2021	International Acoustic Music Awards (2020)	"Heartstrings" written by Gabriel and Michael Saalfield	Best Group or Duo	Finalist
