= All for You (Titanium album) =

Studio album by Titanium
- Released: 7 December 2012
- Recorded: 2012: Auckland
- Genres: Pop, pop rock, dance-pop, teen pop, power pop
- Length: 45:12
- Label: Illegal Musik
- Producers: Inoke Finau, Vince Harder, Mark Arona

Singles from All for You
- 1. "Come On Home" Released: 6 September 2012; 2. "I Won't Give Up" Released: 19 October 2012; 3. "Sky" Released: 2 November 2012; 4. "For the First Time" Released: 21 December 2012

Singles from All for You 2.0
- 1. "Soundtrack to Summer" Released: 1 March 2013; 2. "Tattoo" Released: June 2013; 3. "Unarmed" Released: September 2013

All for You is the only studio album by New Zealand boy band Titanium, released by Illegal Musik worldwide on 7 December 2012. All For You peaked at number 8 on the New Zealand Albums Chart.

== Release ==
After The Edge competition winners were announced and Titanium were formed they began recording the album in Auckland, working with a variety of writers and producers.

The album was released in Australia under the title All For You 2.0 on 4 October 2013.

Titanium performed "Soundtrack to Summer" live on What Now and on The Erin Simpson Show.

== Track listing ==
1. Without You (3:37)
2. Wish You Well (3:26)
3. Come On Home (3:31)
4. Lies (3:39)
5. All for You (3:42)
6. For the First Time (3:24)
7. Sky (3:44)
8. Where I Belong (3:25)
9. Nothing but Love (3:46)
10. The Price We Pay (3:32)
11. I Won't Give Up (3:41)

== 2.0 Track listing ==
1. Come On Home (3:31)
2. I Won't Give Up (3:41)
3. Sky (3:44)
4. Unarmed (3:16)
5. Lies (3:39)
6. Addicted (3:23)
7. For the First Time (3:24)
8. Tattoo (3:23)
9. Should've Known Better (3:33)
10. Soundtrack To Summer (4:45)
11. Without You (3:37)
12. Wish You Well (3:26)
13. All for You (3:42)
14. Where I Belong (3:25)
15. Nothing but Love (3:46)
16. The Price We Pay (3:32)
17. Soundtrack to Summer (Epique Remix) (4:34)

== Charts ==
| Chart (2012-2014) | Peak position |
|---|---|
| New Zealand Albums (RMNZ) | 8 |

== Release history ==
| Region | Date | Label | Format | Catalogue |
|---|---|---|---|---|
| New Zealand | 5 December 2012 | 2012 WHK Music | CD, digital download | |
| Australia | 4 October 2013 | 2013 WHK Music | DD | |
