= Come On Home (Titanium song) =

Single by Titanium

from the album All For You
- B-side: "Takes Me Higher"
- Released: 7 September 2012
- Recorded: 2012
- Length: 3:30
- Label: Illegal Musik, Warner Music
- Songwriters: Vince Harder, I Finau
- Producer: Inoke "NOX" Finau

Titanium singles chronology
"Come On Home" (2012)	"I Won't Give Up" (2012)

Music video
- "Come On Home" on YouTube

"Come On Home" is the debut single by New Zealand boy band Titanium. It was released as the lead single by Illegal Musik on 7 September 2012. The song was written by R&B recording artist, Vince Harder. "Come On Home" is a pop ballad. The song received positive reviews from music critics, highlighting its appeal to the teenage audience and pop sensibility. On the same day of the single's release it reached number one on iTunes. The song debuted at number one on the New Zealand Singles Chart on Monday, 17 September 2012. This accomplishment ensured the boy band received a $10,000 cash prize for reaching number one from The Edge radio station.

== Background and composition ==
"Come On Home" was written by Vince Harder and was initially and predominantly produced by Vince Harder at his home studio before offering it to the group as their winning single, recorded at Illegal Musik Studio and produced and mixed. by Inoke "NOX" Finau. It is a midtempo song with heavy ukulele instrumentation. According to Harder, "The song's about reminiscing about the good times we have with our loved ones, and having them by our side".

== Chart performance ==
"Come On Home" debuted at number one on the New Zealand Singles Chart dated 17 September 2012. The following week it moved down to number three and was certified gold by the Recording Industry Association of New Zealand, denoting 7,500 sales. The song spent a total of eighteen weeks on the top 40 chart, and has since been certified double platinum; 30,000 copies of it have been sold.

== Promotion ==
The music video for "Come On Home" premiered on 6 September 2012. Footage from behind the scenes of the video has since been released on YouTube. The video first aired on Television on 17 September 2012 on Four Live. Titanium performed "Come On Home" for the first time on Good Morning on 9 September 2012. After the performance their first morning television interview took place with host Matai Smith. Later on in the show they performed their second single, "I Won't Give Up".

== Track listing ==
CD single

1. "Come On Home"
2. "Takes Me Higher"
3. "Come On Home" (instrumental)

== Release history ==
Region	Date	Format	Label
New Zealand	7 September 2012	Digital download	WHK Music; Warner
New Zealand	14 September 2012	CD single	Illegal; Warner
Australia	19 August 2013	Digital download	Titanium

== See also ==
- List of number-one singles from the 2010s (New Zealand)
