= Titanium (band) =

New Zealand pop music band

- Origin: New Zealand
- Genres: Pop
- Years active: 2012–2016
- Members: Haydn Linsley; Shaquille Paranihi-Ngauma; TK Paradza; Zac Taylor
- Past members: Andrew Papas; Jordi Webber

Titanium was a New Zealand pop boy band formed in Auckland in 2012 from the winners of The Edge radio station's competition to create New Zealand's first authentic boy band. The Edge radio station hosted auditions across New Zealand and eventually six young men were selected: Zac Taylor, Andrew Papas, Jordi Webber, Shaquille Paranihi-Ngauma, Haydn Linsley and T.K Paradza. They released their debut single, "Come On Home", which debuted at number one on the official New Zealand Singles Chart on 17 September 2012. Titanium released its debut studio album, All For You in December 2012. It became the first New Zealand band to have three songs in the Top 40 Singles Chart at one time.

== History ==
=== 2012: Formation ===
The Edge radio station began a nationwide search to find six young men to form a boy band. Auditions were held across New Zealand. Ten finalists were chosen and sent to "Boyband Camp". At the end of the week public voting for the guys opened and in conjunction with a panel of experts from The Edge, Illegal Musik and Warner Music the final six members were announced and became Titanium. Shortly after releasing their first single "Come On Home" which debuted at number one, the band announced a 15-date Come On Home Tour.

Titanium then went on to support American band Hot Chelle Rae as supporting acts for their New Zealand leg of the "Whatever World Tour", at Vector Arena. The concerts also featured The X Factor contestant and recording artist, Cher Lloyd. After the tour concluded in October 2012, the group continued working on their debut album, recording took place in Auckland, as Titanium worked with producers including Vince Harder.

Titanium's debut studio album All For You was released worldwide on Friday, 7 December 2012. The official second single, "I Won't Give Up" was released to iTunes on 19 October 2012. On 5 November 2012, Titanium made New Zealand music chart history when they became the first New Zealand band to have three singles simultaneously in the official New Zealand Singles Chart.

=== 2013-2014: Commercial success, Mariah Carey tour ===
In 2013, Titanium signed a managing deal with Mike Cammarata who is the manager of American boy band Big Time Rush. Titanium's All For You album was released in Australia on 4 October 2013, under the title All For You 2.0.

In November 2014, the boy-band was the opening act for Mariah Carey on the New Zealand stop of her world tour, The Elusive Chanteuse Show, at Vector Arena in Auckland.

=== 2015-2016: Move to the United States ===
In May 2015 the band moved to Atlanta, Georgia to continue to record and release music as a four-piece.

== Musical style ==
Titanium's music style contains elements of teen pop, dance-pop, and R&B influences. Songs "Come On Home" and "Sky" were particularly noted by music critics for the genres of pop and dance, for their "powerhouse" vocals and "catchy" choruses. The band demonstrates influences from American boy bands Boyz II Men, 'N Sync and the Backstreet Boys but also other influential artists such as Michael Jackson and Beyoncé.

== Members ==
=== Final members ===
Zac Taylor (born 1993) is a New Zealand-born actor, singer-songwriter and performer from Whakatāne, New Zealand. He first gained national attention after being selected for the international Voice of McDonald’s competition, which saw him travel to the United States to compete in the global finals in Orlando, Florida.

Taylor later rose to prominence as a member of the New Zealand pop group Titanium, achieving multiple charting singles including a number-one hit and double-platinum certification. Following the group’s success, he relocated to Australia to pursue a solo music career, releasing a series of singles from 2020 onwards. In January 2025, Taylor released the single Superficial Love, which debuted on the New Zealand Hot Singles Chart.

In recent years, Taylor has shifted his focus towards screen acting, undertaking formal training at the Howard Fine Acting Studio in Australia. In 2025, he will appear in the feature film The Mongoose, starring Liam Neeson, which was filmed in Victoria, Australia.

He is also currently recording for the animated television series It’s Andrew.

Shaquille Paranihi-Ngauma (youngest of the band) was born in 1993 is from Gisborne lived in Hamilton, New Zealand.

Haydn Linsley born in 1993 is originally from Bristol, England and lived in Palmerston North, New Zealand. Before joining the boy band he was a full-time student and part-time barista. Linsley's grandfather is Tony Hatch, composer of the Neighbours theme tune and Petula Clark's "Downtown" among many others. Linsley is currently a vocalist for Rotorua based Reggae-Rock band Tyneegiant, which includes members of the popular Reggae band 1814. Tyneegiant have performed at NZs biggest Reggae festival 'One Love' and are about to release their debut album, 'We are Coming'.

TK Paradza was born and raised in Shurugwi and is from Masvingo Province in Zimbabwe. His family immigrated to New Zealand when his father fled the country as a refugee in 2006 and are now living in Wellington, New Zealand. Before joining the group, TK was studying at Victoria University of Wellington and had released his album project Wallpaper through band camp and SoundCloud in 2012. His YouTube follow up Catch me, brought him some attention on social media and on The Erin Simpson Show and went on to join the group Titanium shortly after. TK has now gone back to continue his studies at Victoria University of Wellington.

=== Past members ===
Jordi Webber left in 2013 when the band relocated to the United States, and went solo. He is known internationally for playing Aiden "Levi Weston" Romero/Ninja Steel Gold Ranger in Power Rangers Ninja Steel (2017–18).

Andrew Papas left the group in 2014.

== Production ==
Vince Harder wrote Titanium's debut single "Come On Home" which received double platinum status in New Zealand and Australia. Harder was born and raised in West Auckland, New Zealand. He has also played the lead role as 'Simba' in the Australian stage production of The Lion King. In 2005, he came third in the Australian TV version of The X Factor, beating over 100,000 people who originally auditioned for a place in the finals.

== Discography ==
- All for You (2012)

== Concert tours ==
- Come On Home Tour (2012)
- Whatever World Tour (2012)
- Teen Rush Tour (Australia 2013)
- Tattoos World Tour (2014) (opening acts for Jason Derulo)
- Take Us Back Tour (2014)
- The Elusive Chanteuse Show world tour (2014) (opening acts for Mariah Carey)

== Awards ==
=== Nowie Awards ===
The Nowie Awards is a kids choice awards show voted by the youth public of New Zealand.

Year	Nominated	Award	Result
2012	Titanium	Best Breakthrough Artist	Won

=== New Zealand Music Awards ===
The New Zealand Music Awards (VNZMA) is an annual New Zealand music awards show.

Year	Nominated	Award	Result
2013	Titanium	Vodafone People's Choice Award	Nominated

== Merchandise ==
The Collateral Company was enlisted to produce Titanium branded merchandise that was given away at events and radio promotions. Merchandise included custom designed metal dog tags and a range of branded wristbands.

== Filmography ==
Television
Year	Title	Role	Notes
2012	20/20	Themselves	Titanium were formed by radio station The Edge

== See also ==
- List of number-one singles from the 2010s (New Zealand)
